= 1989 Alpine Skiing World Cup – Men's overall =

1989 men's overall World Cup
| Previous: 1988 | Next: 1990 |

Men's overall World Cup 1988/1989

In men's overall World Cup 1988/89 all results count. The parallel slalom did not count for the Overall World Cup. Marc Girardelli won his third Overall World Cup.

| Place | Name | Country | Total points | Downhill | Super G | Giant | Slalom | Combined |
|---|---|---|---|---|---|---|---|---|
| 1 | Marc Girardelli | Luxembourg | 407 | 139 | 46 | 66 | 106 | 50 |
| 2 | Pirmin Zurbriggen | Switzerland | 309 | 94 | 62 | 82 | 26 | 45 |
| 3 | Alberto Tomba | Italy | 189 | 0 | 37 | 40 | 112 | 0 |
| 4 | Ole Kristian Furuseth | Norway | 188 | 0 | 0 | 82 | 106 | 0 |
| 5 | Markus Wasmeier | West Germany | 166 | 67 | 43 | 9 | 0 | 47 |
| 6 | Rudolf Nierlich | Austria | 144 | 0 | 0 | 79 | 65 | 0 |
| 7 | Armin Bittner | West Germany | 127 | 0 | 0 | 10 | 117 | 0 |
| 8 | Helmut Höflehner | Austria | 126 | 112 | 14 | 0 | 0 | 0 |
| 9 | Daniel Mahrer | Switzerland | 114 | 102 | 2 | 0 | 0 | 10 |
| 10 | Hubert Strolz | Austria | 112 | 0 | 18 | 46 | 33 | 15 |
| 11 | Lars-Börje Eriksson | Sweden | 102 | 2 | 51 | 38 | 0 | 11 |
| 12 | Peter Müller | Switzerland | 100 | 79 | 6 | 0 | 0 | 15 |
| 13 | Michael Mair | Italy | 89 | 74 | 0 | 0 | 0 | 15 |
| | Peter Wirnsberger | Austria | 89 | 89 | 0 | 0 | 0 | 0 |
| 15 | Martin Hangl | Switzerland | 87 | 0 | 47 | 40 | 0 | 0 |
| 16 | Franck Piccard | France | 82 | 21 | 49 | 6 | 0 | 6 |
| 17 | Ingemar Stenmark | Sweden | 79 | 0 | 0 | 67 | 12 | 0 |
| 18 | Leonhard Stock | Austria | 76 | 57 | 19 | 0 | 0 | 0 |
| 19 | Helmut Mayer | Austria | 74 | 0 | 35 | 39 | 0 | 0 |
| 20 | Paul Accola | Switzerland | 72 | 0 | 0 | 0 | 28 | 44 |
| 21 | Rob Boyd | Canada | 71 | 68 | 0 | 0 | 0 | 3 |
| 22 | Jonas Nilsson | Sweden | 70 | 0 | 0 | 0 | 70 | 0 |
| 23 | Karl Alpiger | Switzerland | 65 | 65 | 0 | 0 | 0 | 0 |
| 24 | Bernhard Gstrein | Austria | 62 | 0 | 0 | 11 | 51 | 0 |
| 25 | Günther Mader | Austria | 58 | 8 | 20 | 12 | 18 | 0 |
| 26 | Michael Tritscher | Austria | 54 | 0 | 0 | 0 | 54 | 0 |
| 27 | William Besse | Switzerland | 51 | 43 | 0 | 0 | 0 | 8 |
| 28 | Hans-Jörg Tauscher | West Germany | 50 | 40 | 0 | 0 | 0 | 10 |
| 29 | Atle Skårdal | Norway | 48 | 28 | 0 | 0 | 0 | 20 |
| 30 | Patrick Ortlieb | Austria | 47 | 47 | 0 | 0 | 0 | 0 |
| 31 | Franz Heinzer | Switzerland | 46 | 41 | 5 | 0 | 0 | 0 |
| 32 | Tomaž Čižman | Yugoslavia | 44 | 0 | 8 | 36 | 0 | 0 |
| 33 | Felix McGrath | United States | 43 | 0 | 0 | 0 | 43 | 0 |
| 34 | Paul Frommelt | Liechtenstein | 42 | 0 | 0 | 0 | 42 | 0 |
| 35 | Hans Enn | Austria | 41 | 0 | 26 | 15 | 0 | 0 |
| | Gustav Oehrli | Switzerland | 41 | 19 | 0 | 0 | 0 | 22 |
| 37 | Armin Assinger | Austria | 38 | 38 | 0 | 0 | 0 | 0 |
| | Tetsuya Okabe | Japan | 38 | 0 | 0 | 0 | 38 | 0 |
| 39 | Thomas Stangassinger | Austria | 32 | 0 | 0 | 1 | 31 | 0 |
| 40 | Luc Alphand | France | 25 | 0 | 25 | 0 | 0 | 0 |
| 41 | Erwin Resch | Austria | 24 | 24 | 0 | 0 | 0 | 0 |
| 42 | Peter Runggaldier | Italy | 23 | 10 | 13 | 0 | 0 | 0 |
| | Johan Wallner | Sweden | 23 | 0 | 0 | 23 | 0 | 0 |
| 44 | Jean-Luc Crétier | France | 22 | 0 | 0 | 0 | 3 | 19 |
| 45 | Jan Einar Thorsen | Norway | 20 | 20 | 0 | 0 | 0 | 0 |
| 46 | Grega Benedik | Yugoslavia | 19 | 0 | 0 | 0 | 19 | 0 |
| | Urs Kälin | Switzerland | 19 | 0 | 6 | 13 | 0 | 0 |
| 48 | Roman Rupp | Austria | 15 | 15 | 0 | 0 | 0 | 0 |
| | Peter Jurko | Czechoslovakia | 15 | 0 | 0 | 0 | 15 | 0 |
| | Christian Gaidet | France | 15 | 0 | 0 | 11 | 4 | 0 |
| 51 | Michael Eder | West Germany | 14 | 0 | 8 | 6 | 0 | 0 |
| | Gerhard Pfaffenbichler | Austria | 14 | 14 | 0 | 0 | 0 | 0 |
| | Giorgio Piantanida | Italy | 14 | 14 | 0 | 0 | 0 | 0 |
| | Berni Huber | West Germany | 14 | 0 | 0 | 0 | 0 | 14 |
| 55 | Willibald Zechner | Austria | 13 | 0 | 0 | 0 | 0 | 13 |
| | Kyle Wieche | United States | 13 | 0 | 0 | 13 | 0 | 0 |
| | Richard Pramotton | Italy | 13 | 0 | 0 | 0 | 13 | 0 |
| | Roberto Grigis | Italy | 13 | 0 | 0 | 0 | 13 | 0 |
| 59 | Josef Polig | Italy | 12 | 0 | 2 | 0 | 0 | 10 |
| | Niklas Henning | Sweden | 12 | 0 | 3 | 9 | 0 | 0 |
| | Peter Roth | West Germany | 12 | 0 | 0 | 4 | 8 | 0 |
| 62 | Attilio Barcella | Italy | 11 | 0 | 0 | 11 | 0 | 0 |
| | Marco Tonazzi | Italy | 11 | 0 | 0 | 2 | 9 | 0 |
| 64 | Oswald Tötsch | Italy | 10 | 0 | 0 | 0 | 10 | 0 |
| | Florian Beck | West Germany | 10 | 0 | 0 | 0 | 10 | 0 |
| 66 | Klaus Gattermann | West Germany | 9 | 9 | 0 | 0 | 0 | 0 |
| | Denis Rey | France | 9 | 0 | 0 | 0 | 0 | 9 |
| 68 | Stefan Krauß | West Germany | 8 | 8 | 0 | 0 | 0 | 0 |
| | Peter Wirnsberger II | Austria | 8 | 0 | 0 | 0 | 0 | 8 |
| | Hans Pieren | Switzerland | 8 | 0 | 0 | 8 | 0 | 0 |
| | Rok Petrović | Yugoslavia | 8 | 0 | 0 | 5 | 3 | 0 |
| 72 | Giglio Tomasi | Italy | 7 | 0 | 0 | 7 | 0 | 0 |
| | Frank Wörndl | West Germany | 7 | 0 | 0 | 0 | 7 | 0 |
| | Patrick Staub | Switzerland | 7 | 0 | 0 | 3 | 4 | 0 |
| | Danilo Sbardellotto | Italy | 7 | 7 | 0 | 0 | 0 | 0 |
| | Felix Belczyk | Canada | 7 | 6 | 1 | 0 | 0 | 0 |
| | Carlo Gerosa | Italy | 7 | 0 | 0 | 0 | 7 | 0 |
| 78 | Yves Tavernier | France | 6 | 0 | 0 | 6 | 0 | 0 |
| | Fredrik Nyberg | Sweden | 6 | 0 | 0 | 0 | 0 | 6 |
| | Tiger Shaw | United States | 6 | 0 | 0 | 0 | 6 | 0 |
| | Bob Ormsby | United States | 6 | 0 | 0 | 0 | 6 | 0 |
| | Jeff Olson | United States | 6 | 0 | 0 | 0 | 0 | 6 |
| | Konrad Walk | Austria | 6 | 0 | 0 | 6 | 0 | 0 |
| | Robert Erlacher | Italy | 6 | 0 | 0 | 6 | 0 | 0 |
| | Robert Žan | Yugoslavia | 6 | 0 | 0 | 6 | 0 | 0 |
| 86 | Graham Bell | United Kingdom | 5 | 5 | 0 | 0 | 0 | 0 |
| | Didier Schmidt | France | 5 | 0 | 0 | 0 | 5 | 0 |
| | Peter Dürr | West Germany | 5 | 5 | 0 | 0 | 0 | 0 |
| | Brian Stemmle | Canada | 5 | 5 | 0 | 0 | 0 | 0 |
| | John Piccard | France | 5 | 0 | 0 | 0 | 5 | 0 |
| | Joël Gaspoz | Switzerland | 5 | 0 | 0 | 5 | 0 | 0 |
| 92 | Herbert Renoth | West Germany | 4 | 0 | 4 | 0 | 0 | 0 |
| | Marian Bíreš | Czechoslovakia | 4 | 0 | 0 | 0 | 0 | 4 |
| | Peter Eigler | West Germany | 4 | 0 | 3 | 0 | 0 | 1 |
| 95 | Mathias Berthold | Austria | 3 | 0 | 0 | 0 | 3 | 0 |
| | Sašo Robič | Yugoslavia | 3 | 0 | 0 | 3 | 0 | 0 |
| 97 | Philipp Schuler | Switzerland | 2 | 2 | 0 | 0 | 0 | 0 |
| | Bernhard Fahner | Switzerland | 2 | 2 | 0 | 0 | 0 | 0 |
| | Lars-Göran Halvarsson | Sweden | 2 | 0 | 0 | 0 | 2 | 0 |
| | Robbie Bosinger | Canada | 2 | 2 | 0 | 0 | 0 | 0 |
| | Hubertus von Hohenlohe | Mexico | 2 | 0 | 0 | 0 | 0 | 2 |
| | Hannes Zehentner | West Germany | 2 | 2 | 0 | 0 | 0 | 0 |
| 103 | Didier Bouvet | France | 1 | 0 | 0 | 0 | 1 | 0 |
| | Heinz Holzer | Italy | 1 | 0 | 1 | 0 | 0 | 0 |
| | Richard Kröll | Austria | 1 | 0 | 0 | 1 | 0 | 0 |
| | Stephan Pistor | West Germany | 1 | 0 | 0 | 0 | 1 | 0 |
| | Ivano Camozzi | Italy | 1 | 0 | 0 | 1 | 0 | 0 |

Alpine skiing World Cup
Men

Overall | Downhill | Super G | Giant slalom | Slalom | Combined

1989
