= 1990 Alpine Skiing World Cup – Men's overall =

1990 men's overall World Cup
Previous: 1989	Next: 1991

Men's overall World Cup 1989/1990

In men's overall World Cup all results count.

Place	Name	Country	Total points	Downhill	Super G	Giant	Slalom	Combined
1	Pirmin Zurbriggen	Switzerland	357	105	98	48	56	50
2	Ole Kristian Furuseth	Norway	234	0	43	96	95	0
3	Günther Mader	Austria	213	0	71	96	31	15
4	Armin Bittner	West Germany	193	0	0	43	150	0
5	Helmut Höflehner	Austria	174	166	8	0	0	0
6	Atle Skårdal	Norway	167	120	47	0	0	0
7	Hubert Strolz	Austria	155	0	33	71	51	0
8	Lars-Börje Eriksson	Sweden	121	4	61	56	0	0
9	Alberto Tomba	Italy	116	0	0	21	95	0
10	Rudolf Nierlich	Austria	110	0	0	42	68	0
11	Paul Accola	Switzerland	109	0	11	0	58	40
12	Daniel Mahrer	Switzerland	105	88	9	0	0	8
13	William Besse	Switzerland	102	88	0	0	0	14
14	Franck Piccard	France	101	27	52	12	0	10
15	Konrad Ladstätter	Italy	97	0	28	0	69	0
	Kristian Ghedina	Italy	97	87	0	0	0	10
17	Bernhard Gstrein	Austria	96	0	0	5	91	0
18	Franz Heinzer	Switzerland	95	84	10	0	0	1
19	Michael Tritscher	Austria	93	0	0	0	93	0
20	Markus Wasmeier	West Germany	91	20	35	9	0	27
21	Jonas Nilsson	Sweden	87	0	0	9	78	0
22	Tetsuya Okabe	Japan	75	0	0	0	75	0
23	Richard Kröll	Austria	65	0	0	65	0	0
	Thomas Stangassinger	Austria	65	0	0	9	56	0
25	Marc Girardelli	Luxembourg	64	0	0	23	41	0
26	Peter Roth	West Germany	61	0	0	15	46	0
27	Niklas Henning	Sweden	57	9	39	9	0	0
28	Peter Runggaldier	Italy	56	10	37	0	0	0
29	Danilo Sbardellotto	Italy	52	28	24	0	0	0
30	Bernhard Fahner	Switzerland	50	35	7	0	0	8
31	Felix Belczyk	Canada	49	49	0	0	0	0
32	Stephan Eberharter	Austria	45	0	26	19	0	0
33	Karl Alpiger	Switzerland	40	17	23	0	0	0
34	Roman Rupp	Austria	38	38	0	0	0	0
35	Fredrik Nyberg	Sweden	37	0	2	35	0	0
36	Urs Kälin	Switzerland	36	0	3	25	0	8
	Hans Stuffer	West Germany	36	0	30	6	0	0
38	Armand Schiele	France	35	0	35	0	0	0
39	Kjetil André Aamodt	Norway	34	0	13	21	0	0
	Peter Wirnsberger	Austria	34	34	0	0	0	0
41	Hans Pieren	Switzerland	31	0	0	31	0	0
42	Steve Locher	Switzerland	28	0	25	3	0	0
43	Patrick Ortlieb	Austria	27	20	0	0	0	7
44	Hannes Zehentner	West Germany	26	22	4	0	0	0
	Paul Frommelt	Liechtenstein	26	0	0	0	26	0
46	Mathias Berthold	Austria	25	0	0	16	9	0
	Michael von Grünigen	Switzerland	25	0	0	18	7	0
48	Mario Summermatter	Switzerland	24	19	0	0	0	5
	A. J. Kitt	United States	24	22	0	0	0	2
	Rob Boyd	Canada	24	24	0	0	0	0
	Thomas Hangl	Austria	23	0	0	0	0	23
52	Rainer Salzgeber	Austria	22	0	0	22	0	0
	Felix McGrath	United States	22	0	0	0	22	0
54	Johan Wallner	Sweden	21	0	0	18	3	0
55	Ivano Camozzi	Italy	20	0	0	20	0	0
	Konrad Walk	Austria	20	0	0	20	0	0
	Giovanni Moro	Italy	20	0	0	0	20	0
58	Tiger Shaw	United States	18	0	0	0	18	0
59	Hans-Jörg Tauscher	West Germany	17	7	10	0	0	0
	Jean-Luc Crétier	France	17	0	17	0	0	0
	Patrice Bianchi	France	17	0	0	0	17	0
	Josef Polig	Italy	17	0	9	0	8	0
63	Erwin Resch	Austria	16	16	0	0	0	0
	Peter Rzehak	Austria	16	8	1	0	0	7
65	Christian Gaidet	France	15	0	0	15	0	0
	Xavier Gigandet	Switzerland	15	9	0	0	0	6
	Alain Villiard	Canada	15	0	0	0	15	0
68	Helmut Mayer	Austria	14	0	0	14	0	0
	Christophe Berra	Switzerland	14	0	0	0	14	0
	Lasse Kjus	Norway	14	0	4	9	1	0
	Berni Huber	West Germany	14	14	0	0	0	0
72	Grega Benedik	Yugoslavia	13	0	0	0	13	0
73	Martin Hangl	Switzerland	12	0	0	12	0	0
	Denis Rey	France	12	12	0	0	0	0
	Christophe Fivel	France	12	12	0	0	0	0
	Luigi Colturi	Italy	12	12	0	0	0	0
	Roberto Spampatti	Italy	12	0	0	0	12	0
	Leonhard Stock	Austria	12	11	1	0	0	0
79	Tomaž Čižman	Yugoslavia	11	0	0	11	0	0
80	Roberto Grigis	Italy	10	0	0	0	10	0
	Luc Alphand	France	10	0	10	0	0	0
	Stefan Krauß	West Germany	10	10	0	0	0	0
	Luca Pesando	Italy	10	0	0	10	0	0
	Bill Hudson	United States	10	3	0	0	0	7
	Carlo Gerosa	Italy	10	0	0	0	10	0
86	Peter Wirnsberger II	Austria	9	0	0	0	0	9
87	Lasse Arnesen	Norway	8	8	0	0	0	0
88	Sašo Robič	Yugoslavia	7	0	0	7	0	0
	Didier Bouvet	France	7	0	0	0	7	0
90	Pietro Vitalini	Italy	6	6	0	0	0	0
91	Jan Einar Thorsen	Norway	5	0	5	0	0	0
	Lukas Perathoner	Italy	5	0	0	0	0	5
93	Bob Ormsby	United States	4	0	0	0	4	0
	Robert Žan	Yugoslavia	4	0	0	4	0	0
	Martin Knöri	Switzerland	4	0	0	2	2	0
	Oswald Tötsch	Italy	4	0	0	0	4	0
97	Gustav Oehrli	Switzerland	3	0	0	0	0	3
	Matteo Belfrond	Italy	3	0	0	3	0	0
	Oliver Künzi	Switzerland	3	0	0	0	3	0
	Ronald Duncan	United Kingdom	3	3	0	0	0	0
	Tommy Moe	United States	3	3	0	0	0	0
102	Richard Pramotton	Italy	2	0	0	0	2	0
	Christian Polig	Italy	2	0	0	0	2	0
	Jeff Olson	United States	2	0	0	0	0	2
	Patrick Staub	Switzerland	2	0	0	0	2	0
	John Piccard	France	2	0	0	0	2	0
109	Peter Müller	Switzerland	1	0	1	0	0	0
	Alexey Maslov	Soviet Union	1	1	0	0	0	0
	Mitja Kunc	Yugoslavia	1	0	0	1	0	0
	Urs Lehmann	Switzerland	1	1	0	0	0	0

Alpine skiing World Cup
Men

Overall | Downhill | Super G | Giant slalom | Slalom | Combined

1990
