= 1990 Alpine Skiing World Cup – Men's giant slalom =

1990 Men's giant slalom World Cup
Previous: 1989	Next: 1991

Men's giant slalom World Cup 1989/1990 was an event in the 1990 Alpine Skiing World Cup won by Austria.

== Calendar ==
Round	Race No	Place	Country	Date	Winner	Second	Third
1	1	Thredbo	Australia	August 11, 1989	(Sweden) Lars-Börje Eriksson	(Norway) Ole Kristian Furuseth	(Austria) Günther Mader
2	3	Park City	United States	November 23, 1989	(Norway) Ole Kristian Furuseth	(Switzerland) Pirmin Zurbriggen	(Italy) Ivano Camozzi
3	5	Waterville Valley	United States	November 30, 1989	(Switzerland) Urs Kälin	(Sweden) Lars-Börje Eriksson	(Austria) Günther Mader
4	6	Mont-Sainte-Anne, Quebec	Canada	December 2, 1989	(Austria) Günther Mader	(Norway) Ole Kristian Furuseth	(West Germany) Armin Bittner
5	16	Alta Badia	Italy	January 14, 1990	(Austria) Richard Kröll	(Austria) Günther Mader	(Austria) Rudolf Nierlich (Austria) Hubert Strolz
6	20	Veysonnaz	Switzerland	January 23, 1990	(Austria) Richard Kröll	(Austria) Hubert Strolz	(Austria) Rudolf Nierlich
7	28	Veysonnaz	Switzerland	March 3, 1990	(Sweden) Fredrik Nyberg	(Austria) Hubert Strolz	(Austria) Richard Kröll

== Final point standings ==
In men's giant slalom World Cup 1989/90 all results count.

Place	Name	Country	Total points	1 (Australia)	3 (United States)	5 (United States)	6 (Canada)	16 (Italy)	20 (Switzerland)	28 (Switzerland)
1	Günther Mader	Austria	96	15	-	15	25	20	11	10
	Ole Kristian Furuseth	Norway	96	20	25	-	20	11	12	8
3	Hubert Strolz	Austria	71	3	11	-	2	15	20	20
4	Richard Kröll	Austria	65	-	-	-	-	25	25	15
5	Lars-Börje Eriksson	Sweden	56	25	-	20	-	-	-	11
6	Pirmin Zurbriggen	Switzerland	48	10	20	9	-	-	2	7
7	Armin Bittner	West Germany	43	7	12	-	15	-	-	9
8	Rudolf Nierlich	Austria	42	-	-	-	12	15	15	-
9	Fredrik Nyberg	Sweden	35	-	-	-	-	10	-	25
10	Hans Pieren	Switzerland	31	1	-	10	-	6	9	5
11	Urs Kälin	Switzerland	25	-	-	25	-	-	-	-
12	Marc Girardelli	Luxembourg	23	12	-	11	-	-	-	-
13	Rainer Salzgeber	Austria	22	-	3	7	-	-	8	4
14	Alberto Tomba	Italy	21	11	-	-	10	-	-	-
	Kjetil André Aamodt	Norway	21	-	1	3	-	5	10	2
16	Ivano Camozzi	Italy	20	-	15	4	1	-	-	-
	Konrad Walk	Austria	20	-	-	6	-	8	6	-
18	Stephan Eberharter	Austria	19	-	8	-	11	-	-	-
19	Michael von Grünigen	Switzerland	18	-	10	-	-	-	8	-
	Johan Wallner	Sweden	18	-	-	-	6	-	-	12
21	Mathias Berthold	Austria	16	-	-	8	8	-	-	-
22	Peter Roth	West Germany	15	5	-	5	3	2	-	-
	Christian Gaidet	France	15	9	5	-	-	1	-	-
24	Helmut Mayer	Austria	14	8	6	-	-	-	-	-
25	Martin Hangl	Switzerland	12	-	-	12	-	-	-	-
	Franck Piccard	France	12	4	7	-	-	-	-	1
27	Tomaž Čižman	Yugoslavia	11	-	-	-	-	-	5	6
28	Luca Pesando	Italy	10	-	-	1	5	4	-	-
29	Niklas Henning	Sweden	9	-	9	-	-	-	-	-
	Markus Wasmeier	West Germany	9	-	-	-	9	-	-	-
	Thomas Stangassinger	Austria	9	-	-	2	7	-	-	-
	Lasse Kjus	Norway	9	-	-	-	-	9	-	-
	Jonas Nilsson	Sweden	9	-	2	-	-	7	-	-
34	Sašo Robič	Yugoslavia	7	-	-	-	-	3	4	-
35	Hans Stuffer	West Germany	6	6	-	-	-	-	-	-
36	Bernhard Gstrein	Austria	5	-	-	-	5	-	-	-
37	Robert Žan	Yugoslavia	4	-	4	-	-	-	-	-
38	Steve Locher	Switzerland	3	-	-	-	-	-	3	-
	Matteo Belfrond	Italy	3	-	-	-	-	-	-	3
40	Martin Knöri	Switzerland	2	2	-	-	-	-	-	-
41	Mitja Kunc	Yugoslavia	1	-	-	-	-	-	1	-

== Men's giant slalom team results ==
bold indicate highest score - italics indicate race wins

Place	Country	Total points	1 (Australia)	3 (United States)	5 (United States)	6 (Canada)	16 (Italy)	20 (Switzerland)	28 (Switzerland)	Racers	Wins
1	Austria	379	26	28	38	70	83	**85**	49	11	3
2	Switzerland	139	13	30	56	-	6	22	12	7	1
3	Sweden	127	25	11	20	6	17	-	48	5	2
4	Norway	126	20	26	3	20	25	22	10	3	1
5	West Germany	73	18	12	5	27	2	-	9	4	0
6	Italy	54	11	15	5	16	4	-	3	4	0
7	France	27	13	12	-	-	1	-	1	2	0
8	Luxembourg	23	12	-	11	-	-	-	-	1	0
	Yugoslavia	23	-	4	-	-	3	10	6	4	0

**Alpine Skiing World Cup**
**Men**

Overall | Downhill | Super G | **Giant slalom** | Slalom | Combined

**1990**
