= 1989 Alpine Skiing World Cup – Men's giant slalom =

1989 Men's giant slalom World Cup
Previous: 1988	Next: 1990

Men's giant slalom World Cup 1988/1989

== Calendar ==
Round	Race No	Place	Country	Date	Winner	Second	Third
1	2	Val Thorens	France	November 29, 1988	(Switzerland) Pirmin Zurbriggen	(Austria) Rudolf Nierlich	(Austria) Hans Enn
2	13	Kirchberg in Tirol	Austria	January 10, 1989	(Austria) Rudolf Nierlich	(Switzerland) Pirmin Zurbriggen	(Italy) Alberto Tomba
3	18	Adelboden	Switzerland	January 17, 1989	(Luxembourg) Marc Girardelli	(Norway) Ole Kristian Furuseth	(Italy) Alberto Tomba
4	25	Aspen	United States	February 19, 1989	(Sweden) Ingemar Stenmark	(Luxembourg) Marc Girardelli	(Sweden) Lars-Börje Eriksson
5	28	Furano	Japan	March 3, 1989	(Austria) Rudolf Nierlich	(Norway) Ole Kristian Furuseth	(Switzerland) Pirmin Zurbriggen
6	30	Shiga Kogen	Japan	March 9, 1989	(Norway) Ole Kristian Furuseth	(Austria) Hubert Strolz	(Sweden) Johan Wallner

== Final point standings ==
In men's giant slalom World Cup 1988/89 all results count.

Place	Name	Country	Total points	2 (France)	13 (Austria)	18 (Switzerland)	25 (United States)	28 (Japan)	30 (Japan)
1	Ole Kristian Furuseth	Norway	82	-	10	20	7	20	25
	Pirmin Zurbriggen	Switzerland	82	25	20	11	-	15	11
3	Rudolf Nierlich	Austria	79	20	25	-	-	25	9
4	Ingemar Stenmark	Sweden	67	9	2	10	25	9	12
5	Marc Girardelli	Luxembourg	66	3	11	25	20	7	-
6	Hubert Strolz	Austria	46	8	9	7	-	2	20
7	Alberto Tomba	Italy	40	-	15	15	10	-	-
	Martin Hangl	Switzerland	40	-	8	9	11	6	6
9	Helmut Mayer	Austria	39	12	5	12	-	10	-
10	Lars-Börje Eriksson	Sweden	38	-	4	-	15	12	7
11	Tomaž Čižman	Yugoslavia	36	10	12	2	12	-	-
12	Johan Wallner	Sweden	23	-	-	-	-	8	15
13	Hans Enn	Austria	15	15	-	-	-	-	-
14	Kyle Wieche	United States	13	-	-	-	9	4	-
	Urs Kälin	Switzerland	13	-	-	5	3	3	2
16	Günther Mader	Austria	12	4	-	-	-	-	8
17	Attilio Barcella	Italy	11	11	-	-	-	-	-
	Christian Gaidet	France	11	-	7	4	-	-	-
	Bernhard Gstrein	Austria	11	-	-	-	-	11	-
20	Armin Bittner	West Germany	10	-	-	-	-	-	10
21	Markus Wasmeier	West Germany	9	1	-	-	8	-	-
	Niklas Henning	Sweden	9	-	-	-	4	-	5
23	Hans Pieren	Switzerland	8	-	-	8	-	-	-
24	Giglio Tomasi	Italy	7	7	-	-	-	-	-
25	Yves Tavernier	France	6	6	-	-	-	-	-
	Michael Eder	West Germany	6	-	6	-	-	-	-
	Robert Erlacher	Italy	6	-	-	6	-	-	-
	Konrad Walk	Austria	6	-	-	-	6	-	-
	Franck Piccard	France	6	-	-	-	5	1	-
	Robert Žan	Yugoslavia	6	-	3	-	-	-	3
31	Rok Petrović	Yugoslavia	5	5	-	-	-	-	-
	Joël Gaspoz	Switzerland	5	-	-	-	-	5	-
33	Peter Roth	West Germany	4	-	-	-	-	-	4
34	Patrick Staub	Switzerland	3	-	-	3	-	-	-
	Sašo Robič	Yugoslavia	3	-	-	1	2	-	-
36	Marco Tonazzi	Italy	2	2	-	-	-	-	-
37	Richard Kröll	Austria	1	-	1	-	-	-	-
	Thomas Stangassinger	Austria	1	-	-	-	1	-	-
	Ivano Camozzi	Italy	1	-	-	-	-	-	1

== Men's giant slalom team results ==
bold indicate highest score - italics indicate race wins

Place	Country	Total points	2 (France)	13 (Austria)	18 (Switzerland)	25 (United States)	28 (Japan)	30 (Japan)	Racers	Wins
1	Austria	210	**59**	40	19	7	48	37	9	2
2	Switzerland	151	25	28	36	14	29	19	6	1
3	Sweden	137	9	6	10	44	29	39	4	1
4	Norway	82	-	10	20	7	20	25	1	1
5	Italy	67	20	15	21	10	-	1	6	0
6	Luxembourg	66	3	11	25	20	7	-	1	1
7	Yugoslavia	50	15	15	3	14	-	3	4	0
8	West Germany	29	1	6	-	8	-	14	4	0
9	France	23	6	7	4	5	1	-	3	0
10	United States	13	-	-	-	9	4	-	1	0

**Alpine Skiing World Cup**
**Men**

Overall | Downhill | Super G | **Giant slalom** | Slalom | Combined

**1989**
