= 1989 Alpine Skiing World Cup – Men's slalom =

1989 Men's slalom World Cup
Previous: 1988	Next: 1990

Men's slalom World Cup 1988/1989

== Calendar ==
Round	Race No	Place	Country	Date	Winner	Second	Third
1	3	Sestriere	Italy	December 6, 1988	(Luxembourg) Marc Girardelli	(Sweden) Jonas Nilsson	(Switzerland) Paul Accola
2	6	Madonna di Campiglio	Italy	December 11, 1988	(Italy) Alberto Tomba	(Luxembourg) Marc Girardelli	(Austria) Michael Tritscher
3	7	Kranjska Gora	Yugoslavia	December 17, 1988	(Luxembourg) Marc Girardelli	(West Germany) Armin Bittner	(Italy) Alberto Tomba
4	8	St. Anton	Austria	December 21, 1988	(West Germany) Armin Bittner	(Austria) Bernhard Gstrein	(Switzerland) Pirmin Zurbriggen
5	16	Kitzbühel	Austria	January 15, 1989	(West Germany) Armin Bittner	(Italy) Alberto Tomba	(Austria) Rudolf Nierlich
6	21	Wengen	Switzerland	January 22, 1989	(Austria) Rudolf Nierlich	(Italy) Alberto Tomba	(Austria) Hubert Strolz
7	29	Furano	Japan	March 5, 1989	(Norway) Ole Kristian Furuseth	(Italy) Alberto Tomba	(Sweden) Jonas Nilsson
8	31	Shiga Kogen	Japan	March 10, 1989	(Austria) Rudolf Nierlich	(Norway) Ole Kristian Furuseth	(West Germany) Armin Bittner

== Final point standings ==
In men's slalom World Cup 1988/89 all results count.

Place	Name	Country	Total points	3 (Italy)	6 (Italy)	7 (Socialist Federal Republic of Yugoslavia)	8 (Austria)	16 (Austria)	21 (Switzerland)	29 (Japan)	31 (Japan)
1	Armin Bittner	West Germany	117	12	12	20	25	25	-	8	15
2	Alberto Tomba	Italy	112	-	25	15	-	20	20	20	12
3	Marc Girardelli	Luxembourg	106	25	20	25	-	12	12	12	-
	Ole Kristian Furuseth	Norway	106	7	8	12	12	11	11	25	20
5	Jonas Nilsson	Sweden	70	20	-	7	8	-	10	15	10
6	Rudolf Nierlich	Austria	65	-	-	-	-	15	25	-	25
7	Michael Tritscher	Austria	54	8	15	4	9	-	5	7	6
8	Bernhard Gstrein	Austria	51	11	11	-	20	-	-	9	-
9	Felix McGrath	United States	43	9	-	8	11	-	-	11	4
10	Paul Frommelt	Liechtenstein	42	-	10	1	-	10	9	5	7
11	Tetsuya Okabe	Japan	38	11	4	9	-	7	3	4	-
12	Hubert Strolz	Austria	33	1	-	11	6	-	15	-	-
13	Thomas Stangassinger	Austria	31	-	9	2	10	-	-	10	-
14	Paul Accola	Switzerland	28	15	-	6	7	-	-	-	-
15	Pirmin Zurbriggen	Switzerland	26	-	-	-	15	-	-	-	11
16	Grega Benedik	Yugoslavia	19	-	-	-	-	8	8	3	-
17	Günther Mader	Austria	18	-	-	3	-	-	6	-	9
18	Peter Jurko	Czechoslovakia	15	-	-	10	-	5	-	-	-
19	Richard Pramotton	Italy	13	-	-	-	1	-	7	-	5
	Roberto Grigis	Italy	13	-	-	-	-	9	-	2	2
21	Ingemar Stenmark	Sweden	12	-	7	-	5	-	-	-	-
22	Oswald Tötsch	Italy	10	5	-	5	-	-	-	-	-
	Florian Beck	West Germany	10	2	6	-	2	-	-	-	-
24	Marco Tonazzi	Italy	9	4	-	-	3	-	2	-	-
25	Peter Roth	West Germany	8	-	-	-	-	-	-	-	8
26	Frank Wörndl	West Germany	7	-	3	-	4	-	-	-	-
	Carlo Gerosa	Italy	7	6	-	-	-	-	-	1	-
28	Tiger Shaw	United States	6	-	-	-	-	6	-	-	-
	Bob Ormsby	United States	6	-	-	-	-	-	-	6	-
30	Didier Schmidt	France	5	-	5	-	-	-	-	-	-
	John Piccard	France	5	-	-	-	-	-	5	-	-
32	Patrick Staub	Switzerland	4	-	-	-	-	4	-	-	-
	Christian Gaidet	France	4	-	-	-	-	3	1	-	-
34	Mathias Berthold	Austria	3	3	-	-	-	-	-	-	-
	Jean-Luc Crétier	France	3	-	-	-	-	-	-	-	3
	Rok Petrović	Yugoslavia	3	-	2	-	-	-	-	-	1
37	Lars-Göran Halvarsson	Sweden	2	-	-	-	-	2	-	-	-
38	Didier Bouvet	France	1	-	1	-	-	-	-	-	-
	Stephan Pistor	West Germany	1	-	-	-	-	1	-	-	-

== Men's slalom team results ==
bold indicate highest score - italics indicate race wins

Place	Country	Total points	3 (Italy)	6 (Italy)	7 (Socialist Federal Republic of Yugoslavia)	8 (Austria)	16 (Austria)	21 (Switzerland)	29 (Japan)	31 (Japan)	Racers	Wins
1	Austria	255	23	35	20	45	15	**51**	26	40	7	2
2	Italy	164	15	25	20	4	29	29	23	19	6	1
3	West Germany	143	14	21	20	31	26	-	8	23	5	2
4	Luxembourg	106	25	20	25	-	12	12	12	-	1	2
	Norway	106	7	8	12	12	11	11	25	20	1	1
6	Sweden	84	20	7	7	13	2	10	15	10	3	0
7	Switzerland	58	15	-	6	22	4	-	-	11	3	0
8	United States	55	9	-	8	11	6	-	17	4	3	0
9	Liechtenstein	42	-	10	1	-	10	9	5	7	1	0
10	Japan	38	11	4	9	-	7	3	4	-	1	0
11	Yugoslavia	22	-	2	-	-	8	8	3	1	2	0
12	France	18	-	6	-	-	3	6	-	3	5	0
13	Czechoslovakia	15	-	-	10	-	5	-	-	-	1	0

**Alpine Skiing World Cup**
**Men**

Overall | Downhill | Super G | Giant slalom | **Slalom** | Combined

**1989**
