= 1988 Alpine Skiing World Cup – Men's slalom =

1988 Men's Slalom World Cup
Previous: 1987	Next: 1989

Men's slalom World Cup 1987/1988

== Final point standings ==
In men's slalom World Cup 1987/88 all results count. Alberto Tomba was able to win six races out of eight.

Place	Name	Country	Total points	1 (Italy)	6 (Italy)	8 (Socialist Federal Republic of Yugoslavia)	12 (Austria)	14 (Austria)	25 (Sweden)	28 (Norway)	31 (Austria)
1	Alberto Tomba	Italy	170	25	25	25	20	25	25	25	-
2	Günther Mader	Austria	69	15	-	15	7	-	15	11	6
3	Felix McGrath	United States	53	-	-	4	9	9	20	-	11
4	Paul Frommelt	Liechtenstein	52	12	-	-	-	-	-	15	25
	Armin Bittner	West Germany	52	-	12	-	12	-	-	8	20
6	Hubert Strolz	Austria	50	-	8	8	-	11	8	-	15
7	Bernhard Gstrein	Austria	49	-	-	-	25	15	-	-	9
	Jonas Nilsson	Sweden	49	20	-	-	15	-	-	7	7
9	Pirmin Zurbriggen	Switzerland	45	9	-	12	-	-	-	12	12
10	Grega Benedik	Yugoslavia	44	5	5	9	-	6	9	10	-
11	Tetsuya Okabe	Japan	42	-	2	-	-	10	2	20	8
	Thomas Stangassinger	Austria	42	-	9	-	-	20	-	9	4
13	Richard Pramotton	Italy	33	7	-	20	6	-	-	-	-
	Carlo Gerosa	Italy	33	10	11	-	2	-	-	-	10
15	Dietmar Köhlbichler	Austria	24	-	-	8	10	-	-	6	-
16	Bojan Križaj	Yugoslavia	21	6	15	-	-	-	-	-	-
	Ingemar Stenmark	Sweden	21	-	-	10	-	-	11	-	-
18	Rudolf Nierlich	Austria	20	-	20	-	-	-	-	-	-
	Christian Orlainsky	Austria	20	3	10	-	-	7	-	-	-
20	Frank Wörndl	West Germany	19	-	7	-	-	-	12	-	-
21	Oswald Tötsch	Italy	18	-	-	5	8	-	-	-	5
22	Mathias Berthold	Austria	17	-	-	8	3	2	-	4	-
23	Marc Girardelli	Luxembourg	15	4	-	-	11	-	-	-	-
24	Lars-Göran Halvarsson	Sweden	14	-	6	3	-	-	5	-	-
25	Roland Pfeifer	Austria	13	11	-	2	-	-	-	-	-
26	Giovanni Moro	Italy	12	8	-	-	4	-	-	-	-
	Rok Petrović	Yugoslavia	12	-	-	11	1	-	-	-	-
	Robert Žan	Yugoslavia	12	-	-	-	-	12	-	-	-
	Peter Roth	West Germany	12	-	-	-	-	-	7	5	-
30	Finn Christian Jagge	Norway	11	1	3	-	5	-	-	2	-
31	Florian Beck	West Germany	10	-	5	-	-	5	-	-	-
	Jörgen Sundqvist	Sweden	10	-	-	-	-	-	10	-	-
33	Michael Tritscher	Austria	9	-	-	-	-	-	6	-	3
34	Paul Accola	Switzerland	8	-	-	-	-	8	-	-	-
35	Roberto Grigis	Italy	6	-	-	-	-	4	-	-	2
36	Didier Bouvet	France	4	-	-	-	-	-	4	-	-
	Stephan Pistor	West Germany	4	-	-	-	-	-	3	-	1
38	Konrad Ladstätter	Italy	3	-	-	-	-	3	-	-	-
	Jean-Daniel Délèze	Switzerland	3	-	-	-	-	-	-	3	-
40	Marco Tonazzi	Italy	2	2	-	-	-	-	-	-	-
	Ivano Edalini	Italy	2	-	-	1	-	-	1	-	-
42	Christian Gaidet	France	2	-	1	-	-	-	-	-	-
	Peter Jurko	Czechoslovakia	1	-	-	-	-	1	-	-	-
	Ole Kristian Furuseth	Norway	1	-	-	-	-	-	-	1	-

Alpine skiing World Cup
Men

Overall | Downhill | Super G | Giant | Slalom | Combined

1988
