= 1990 Alpine Skiing World Cup – Men's slalom =

1990 Men's slalom World Cup
Previous: 1989	Next: 1991

Men's slalom World Cup 1989/1990

== Calendar ==
Round	Race No	Place	Country	Date	Winner	Second	Third
1	2	Thredbo	Australia	August 12, 1989	(West Germany) Armin Bittner	(Norway) Ole Kristian Furuseth	(Austria) Bernhard Gstrein
2	4	Waterville Valley	United States	November 29, 1989	(Italy) Alberto Tomba	(Switzerland) Pirmin Zurbriggen	(Luxembourg) Marc Girardelli
3	7	Mont-Sainte-Anne, Quebec	Canada	December 3, 1989	(Austria) Thomas Stangassinger	(Austria) Bernhard Gstrein	(Luxembourg) Marc Girardelli
4	11	Kranjska Gora	Yugoslavia	January 6, 1990	(Sweden) Jonas Nilsson	(Austria) Hubert Strolz	(Austria) Michael Tritscher
5	12	Kranjska Gora	Yugoslavia	January 7, 1990	(West Germany) Armin Bittner	(Austria) Bernhard Gstrein	(Switzerland) Paul Accola
6	14	Schladming	Austria	January 12, 1990	(West Germany) Armin Bittner	(Austria) Michael Tritscher	(Japan) Tetsuya Okabe (Italy) Konrad Ladstätter
7	18	Kitzbühel	Austria	January 21, 1990	(Austria) Rudolf Nierlich	(Norway) Ole Kristian Furuseth	(West Germany) Armin Bittner
8	29	Veysonnaz	Switzerland	March 4, 1990	(West Germany) Armin Bittner	(Italy) Alberto Tomba	(Austria) Hubert Strolz
9	30	Geilo	Norway	March 8, 1990	(Italy) Alberto Tomba	(Austria) Michael Tritscher	(Sweden) Jonas Nilsson
10	32	Sälen	Sweden	March 12, 1990	(Italy) Alberto Tomba	(Austria) Rudolf Nierlich	(West Germany) Armin Bittner

== Final point standings ==
In men's slalom World Cup 1989/90 all results count.

Place	Name	Country	Total points	2 (Australia)	4 (United States)	7 (Canada)	11 (Socialist Federal Republic of Yugoslavia)	12 (Socialist Federal Republic of Yugoslavia)	14 (Austria)	18 (Austria)	29 (Switzerland)	30 (Norway)	32 (Sweden)
1	Armin Bittner	West Germany	150	25	11	9	-	25	25	15	25	-	15
2	Alberto Tomba	Italy	95	-	25	-	-	-	-	-	20	25	25
	Ole Kristian Furuseth	Norway	95	20	12	10	10	9	-	20	-	8	6
4	Michael Tritscher	Austria	93	-	7	-	15	11	20	12	-	20	8
5	Bernhard Gstrein	Austria	91	15	10	20	11	20	-	-	4	11	-
6	Jonas Nilsson	Sweden	78	-	1	5	25	12	-	11	-	15	9
7	Tetsuya Okabe	Japan	75	3	-	12	-	-	15	11	12	10	12
8	Konrad Ladstätter	Italy	69	-	9	7	7	10	15	-	11	-	10
9	Rudolf Nierlich	Austria	68	1	-	-	12	-	10	25	-	-	20
10	Paul Accola	Switzerland	58	7	5	6	9	15	8	8	-	-	-
11	Pirmin Zurbriggen	Switzerland	56	9	20	-	-	-	6	4	10	7	-
	Thomas Stangassinger	Austria	56	12	-	25	-	-	-	-	-	12	7
13	Hubert Strolz	Austria	51	-	-	4	20	-	-	9	15	3	-
14	Peter Roth	West Germany	46	6	-	-	8	5	11	-	-	5	11
15	Marc Girardelli	Luxembourg	41	11	15	15	-	-	-	-	-	-	-
16	Günther Mader	Austria	31	8	-	11	-	-	5	7	-	-	-
17	Paul Frommelt	Liechtenstein	26	-	-	-	5	7	9	-	-	-	5
18	Felix McGrath	United States	22	-	8	-	3	-	4	5	-	2	-
19	Giovanni Moro	Italy	20	-	-	-	-	4	7	-	5	4	-
20	Tiger Shaw	United States	18	-	-	-	-	-	3	6	-	9	-
21	Patrice Bianchi	France	17	-	-	-	2	-	-	-	9	6	-
22	Alain Villiard	Canada	15	-	-	-	4	8	-	-	-	-	3
23	Christophe Berra	Switzerland	14	-	6	-	1	6	-	-	-	1	-
24	Grega Benedik	Yugoslavia	13	-	-	3	6	3	-	-	-	-	1
25	Roberto Spampatti	Italy	12	-	-	-	-	-	-	3	9	-	-
26	Roberto Grigis	Italy	10	10	-	-	-	-	-	-	-	-	-
	Carlo Gerosa	Italy	10	5	-	-	-	1	-	-	-	-	4
28	Mathias Berthold	Austria	9	-	-	9	-	-	-	-	-	-	-
29	Josef Polig	Italy	8	-	-	-	-	-	-	-	6	-	2
30	Michael von Grünigen	Switzerland	7	-	4	1	-	-	-	2	-	-	-
	Didier Bouvet	France	7	-	-	-	-	-	-	-	7	-	-
32	Bob Ormsby	United States	4	4	-	-	-	-	-	-	-	-	-
	Oswald Tötsch	Italy	4	-	-	-	-	2	2	-	-	-	-
34	Johan Wallner	Sweden	3	-	3	-	-	-	-	-	-	-	-
	Oliver Künzi	Switzerland	3	-	-	-	-	-	-	-	3	-	-
36	Richard Pramotton	Italy	2	2	-	-	-	-	-	-	-	-	-
	Martin Knöri	Switzerland	2	-	2	-	-	-	-	-	-	-	-
	Christian Polig	Italy	2	-	-	2	-	-	-	-	-	-	-
	Patrick Staub	Switzerland	2	-	-	-	-	-	-	-	2	-	-
	John Piccard	France	2	-	-	-	-	-	1	-	1	-	-
41	Lasse Kjus	Norway	1	-	-	-	-	-	-	1	-	-	-

== Men's slalom team results ==
bold indicate highest score - italics indicate race wins

Place	Country	Total points	2 (Australia)	4 (United States)	7 (Canada)	11 (Socialist Federal Republic of Yugoslavia)	12 (Socialist Federal Republic of Yugoslavia)	14 (Austria)	18 (Austria)	29 (Switzerland)	30 (Norway)	32 (Sweden)	Racers	Wins
1	Austria	399	36	14	**69**	58	31	36	53	19	46	35	7	2
2	Italy	232	17	34	9	7	17	24	3	51	29	41	10	3
3	West Germany	196	31	11	9	8	30	36	15	25	5	26	2	4
4	Switzerland	142	16	37	7	10	21	14	14	15	8	-	7	0
5	Norway	96	20	12	10	10	9	-	21	-	8	6	2	0
6	Sweden	81	-	4	5	25	12	-	11	-	15	9	2	1
7	Japan	75	3	-	12	-	-	15	11	12	10	12	1	0
8	United States	44	4	8	-	3	-	7	11	-	11	-	3	0
9	Luxembourg	41	11	15	15	-	-	-	-	-	-	-	1	0
10	France	26	-	-	-	2	-	1	-	17	6	-	3	0
11	Liechtenstein	26	-	-	-	5	7	9	-	-	-	5	1	0
12	Canada	15	-	-	-	4	8	-	-	-	-	-	1	0
13	Yugoslavia	13	-	-	3	6	3	-	-	-	-	1	1	0

**Alpine Skiing World Cup**
**Men**

Overall | Downhill | Super G | Giant slalom | **Slalom** | Combined

**1990**
