= 1988 Alpine Skiing World Cup – Men's super-G =

1988 Men's Super G World Cup
Previous: 1987	Next: 1989

Men's super G World Cup 1987/1988

== Final point standings ==
In men's super G World Cup 1987/88 all four results count. Pirmin Zurbriggen won the cup without a single race-win. All events were won by different skiers.

Place	Name	Country	Total points	11 (France)	19 (Switzerland)	24 (United States)	29 (Austria)
1	Pirmin Zurbriggen	Switzerland	58	15	20	12	11
2	Markus Wasmeier	West Germany	57	25	12	20	-
3	Franck Piccard	France	54	20	-	25	9
4	Marc Girardelli	Luxembourg	38	8	-	15	15
5	Hubert Strolz	Austria	31	4	-	7	20
6	Martin Hangl	Switzerland	30	5	-	-	25
	Leonhard Stock	Austria	30	10	-	10	10
8	Alberto Tomba	Italy	29	11	-	11	7
9	Felix Belczyk	Canada	27	-	25	2	-
10	Hans Enn	Austria	24	6	6	-	12
	Günther Mader	Austria	24	12	3	8	1
12	Heinz Holzer	Italy	18	3	15	-	-
13	Lars-Börje Eriksson	Sweden	15	7	-	4	4
14	Gerhard Pfaffenbichler	Austria	14	-	11	3	-
15	Helmut Mayer	Austria	11	9	-	-	2
16	Danilo Sbardellotto	Italy	10	-	10	-	-
	Franz Heinzer	Switzerland	10	-	10	-	-
	Luc Alphand	France	10	-	-	5	5
19	Peter Müller	Switzerland	9	-	-	9	-
	Andreas Wenzel	Liechtenstein	9	-	-	6	3
21	Jan Einar Thorsen	Norway	8	-	8	-	-
	Luca Pesando	Italy	8	-	-	-	8
23	Steven Lee	Australia	7	-	7	-	-
	Walter Gugele	Austria	7	-	-	-	7
25	Helmut Höflehner	Austria	6	-	4	2	-
26	Martin Bell	United Kingdom	5	-	5	-	-
27	Daniel Mahrer	Switzerland	4	2	2	-	-
28	Peter Wirnsberger	Austria	2	2	-	-	-
29	Michael Eder	West Germany	1	-	1	-	-
	Tomaž Čižman	Yugoslavia	1	-	-	-	1

Alpine skiing World Cup
Men

Overall | Downhill | Super G | Giant slalom | Slalom | Combined

1988
