= 1988 Alpine Skiing World Cup – Men's giant slalom =

1988 Men's giant slalom World Cup
Previous: 1987	Next: 1989

Men's giant slalom World Cup 1987/1988

== Final point standings ==
In men's giant slalom World Cup 1987/88 all results count.

Place	Name	Country	Total points	2 (Italy)	5 (Italy)	7 (Socialist Federal Republic of Yugoslavia)	16 (Switzerland)	21 (Austria)	30 (Austria)
1	Alberto Tomba	Italy	82	25	25	-	25	7	-
2	Hubert Strolz	Austria	69	-	11	15	11	20	12
3	Helmut Mayer	Austria	67	12	-	25	15	15	-
4	Pirmin Zurbriggen	Switzerland	65	-	10	20	12	8	15
5	Günther Mader	Austria	57	-	5	10	20	12	10
6	Hans Pieren	Switzerland	48	6	15	12	-	11	4
7	Rudolf Nierlich	Austria	47	-	20	-	2	25	-
8	Martin Hangl	Switzerland	46	5	-	11	5	-	25
9	Ingemar Stenmark	Sweden	37	20	-	6	-	-	11
10	Frank Wörndl	West Germany	36	10	7	8	1	4	6
11	Joël Gaspoz	Switzerland	35	15	15	-	-	-	5
12	Ivano Camozzi	Italy	31	11	-	10	8	-	2
13	Marc Girardelli	Luxembourg	30	-	-	-	10	-	20
14	Hans Enn	Austria	27	8	-	1	-	9	9
15	Markus Wasmeier	West Germany	24	2	6	-	6	10	-
16	Tomaž Čižman	Yugoslavia	23	-	3	-	7	6	7
17	Bernhard Gstrein	Austria	17	9	-	4	4	-	-
18	Christian Gaidet	France	16	-	-	5	9	2	-
19	Richard Pramotton	Italy	12	7	-	2	-	3	-
20	Peter Roth	West Germany	10	-	-	7	3	-	-
21	Andreas Wenzel	Liechtenstein	9	-	9	-	-	-	-
22	Felix McGrath	United States	8	-	8	-	-	-	-
	Guido Hinterseer	Austria	8	-	-	-	-	-	8
24	Yves Tavernier	France	7	-	2	-	-	5	-
25	Marco Tonazzi	Italy	4	4	-	-	-	-	-
	Johan Wallner	Sweden	4	-	4	-	-	-	-
	Jörgen Sundqvist	Sweden	4	-	1	3	-	-	-
	Robert Erlacher	Italy	4	3	-	-	-	1	-
29	Hans Stuffer	West Germany	3	-	-	-	-	-	3
30	Jonas Nilsson	Sweden	1	1	-	-	-	-	-
	Richard Kröll	Austria	1	-	-	-	-	-	1

Alpine Skiing World Cup
Men

Overall | Downhill | Super G | Giant slalom | Slalom | Combined

1988
