= 1989 Alpine Skiing World Cup – Men's combined =

1989 Men's combined World Cup
Previous: 1988	Next: 1990

Men's combined World Cup 1988/1989

== Calendar ==
Round	Race No	Discipline	Place	Country	Date	Winner	Second	Third
1	10	Slalom; Downhill	St. Anton	Austria	December 21, 1988; December 22, 1988	(Switzerland) Pirmin Zurbriggen	(West Germany) Markus Wasmeier	(Austria) Hubert Strolz
2	17	Downhill; Slalom	Kitzbühel	Austria	January 13 or 14 1989; January 13, 1989	(Luxembourg) Marc Girardelli	(Switzerland) Paul Accola	(Italy) Michael Mair
3	22	Downhill; Slalom	Wengen	Switzerland	January 20 or 21 1989; January 22, 1989	(Luxembourg) Marc Girardelli	(Switzerland) Pirmin Zurbriggen	(West Germany) Markus Wasmeier

== Final point standings ==
In men's combined World Cup 1988/89 all three results count.

Place	Name	Country	Total points	10 (Austria)	17 (Austria)	22 (Switzerland)
1	Marc Girardelli	Luxembourg	50	-	25	25
2	Markus Wasmeier	West Germany	47	20	12	15
3	Pirmin Zurbriggen	Switzerland	45	25	-	20
4	Paul Accola	Switzerland	44	12	20	12
5	Gustav Oehrli	Switzerland	22	3	8	11
6	Atle Skårdal	Norway	20	7	5	8
7	Jean-Luc Crétier	France	19	9	10	-
8	Hubert Strolz	Austria	15	15	-	-
	Michael Mair	Italy	15	-	15	-
	Peter Müller	Switzerland	15	4	11	-
11	Berni Huber	West Germany	14	5	-	9
12	Willibald Zechner	Austria	13	-	7	6
13	Lars-Börje Eriksson	Sweden	11	11	-	-
14	Hans-Jörg Tauscher	West Germany	10	10	-	-
	Josef Polig	Italy	10	-	-	10
	Daniel Mahrer	Switzerland	10	-	3	7
17	Denis Rey	France	9	-	9	-
18	Peter Wirnsberger II	Austria	8	8	-	-
	William Besse	Switzerland	8	2	1	5
20	Fredrik Nyberg	Sweden	6	6	-	-
	Franck Piccard	France	6	-	6	-
	Jeff Olson	United States	6	-	2	4
23	Marian Bíreš	Czechoslovakia	4	-	4	-
24	Rob Boyd	Canada	3	-	-	3
25	Hubertus von Hohenlohe	Mexico	2	-	-	2
26	Peter Eigler	West Germany	1	1	-	-

== Men's combined team results ==
bold indicate highest score - italics indicate race wins

Place	Country	Total points	10 (Austria)	17 (Austria)	22 (Switzerland)	Racers	Wins
1	Switzerland	144	46	43	**55**	6	1
2	West Germany	72	36	12	24	4	0
3	Luxembourg	50	-	25	25	1	2
4	Austria	36	23	7	6	3	0
5	France	34	9	25	-	3	0
6	Italy	25	-	15	10	2	0
7	Norway	20	7	5	8	1	0
8	Sweden	17	17	-	-	2	0
9	United States	6	-	2	4	1	0
10	Czechoslovakia	4	-	4	-	1	0
11	Canada	3	-	-	3	1	0
12	Mexico	2	-	-	2	1	0

**Alpine Skiing World Cup**
**Men**

Overall | Downhill | Super G | Giant slalom | Slalom | **Combined**

**1989**
