= 1989 Alpine Skiing World Cup – Men's downhill =

1989 Men's downhill World Cup
Previous: 1988	Next: 1990

Men's downhill World Cup 1988/1989

== Calendar ==
Round	Race No	Place	Country	Date	Winner	Second	Third
1	4	Val Gardena	Italy	December 9, 1988	(Switzerland) Peter Müller	(Austria) Armin Assinger	(Canada) Rob Boyd
2	5	Val Gardena	Italy	December 10, 1988	(Austria) Helmut Höflehner	(Austria) Patrick Ortlieb	(Switzerland) Peter Müller
3	9	St. Anton	Austria	December 22, 1988	(Austria) Helmut Höflehner	(Switzerland) Pirmin Zurbriggen	(Austria) Leonhard Stock
4	11	Laax	Switzerland	January 6, 1989	(Austria) Leonhard Stock	(Austria) Peter Wirnsberger	(Austria) Helmut Höflehner
5	14	Kitzbühel	Austria	January 13, 1989	(Luxembourg) Marc Girardelli	(Italy) Michael Mair	(Austria) Roman Rupp
6	15	Kitzbühel	Austria	January 14, 1989	(Switzerland) Daniel Mahrer	(Luxembourg) Marc Girardelli	(Austria) Peter Wirnsberger
7	19	Wengen	Switzerland	January 20, 1989	(Luxembourg) Marc Girardelli	(West Germany) Markus Wasmeier	(Switzerland) Daniel Mahrer
8	20	Wengen	Switzerland	January 21, 1989	(Luxembourg) Marc Girardelli	(Switzerland) Pirmin Zurbriggen	(Switzerland) Daniel Mahrer
9	23	Aspen	United States	February 17, 1989	(Switzerland) Karl Alpiger	(Luxembourg) Marc Girardelli	(Switzerland) Daniel Mahrer
10	26	Whistler Mountain	Canada	February 25, 1989	(Canada) Rob Boyd	(Switzerland) Daniel Mahrer	(Switzerland) Pirmin Zurbriggen

== Final point standings ==
In men's downhill World Cup 1988/89 all results count.

Place	Name	Country	Total points	4 (Italy)	5 (Italy)	9 (Austria)	11 (Switzerland)	14 (Austria)	15 (Austria)	19 (Switzerland)	20 (Switzerland)	23 (United States)	26 (Canada)
1	Marc Girardelli	Luxembourg	139	-	-	12	7	25	20	25	25	20	5
2	Helmut Höflehner	Austria	112	4	25	25	15	-	6	4	10	11	12
3	Daniel Mahrer	Switzerland	102	-	-	3	-	9	25	15	15	15	20
4	Pirmin Zurbriggen	Switzerland	94	12	-	20	6	-	12	8	20	1	15
5	Peter Wirnsberger	Austria	89	7	-	10	20	10	15	11	-	9	7
6	Peter Müller	Switzerland	79	25	15	-	-	12	11	-	-	6	10
7	Michael Mair	Italy	74	3	6	11	12	20	8	7	4	3	-
8	Rob Boyd	Canada	68	15	-	-	-	-	10	9	9	-	25
9	Markus Wasmeier	West Germany	67	9	-	9	10	-	-	20	11	8	-
10	Karl Alpiger	Switzerland	65	-	10	-	1	11	7	5	5	25	1
11	Leonhard Stock	Austria	57	5	-	15	25	5	3	-	-	4	-
12	Patrick Ortlieb	Austria	47	11	20	-	-	2	-	-	-	10	4
13	William Besse	Switzerland	43	-	12	8	9	6	5	-	-	-	3
14	Franz Heinzer	Switzerland	41	6	-	7	-	-	5	12	-	-	11
15	Hans-Jörg Tauscher	West Germany	40	10	-	1	11	-	-	10	8	-	-
16	Armin Assinger	Austria	38	20	1	-	-	7	10	-	-	-	-
17	Atle Skårdal	Norway	28	-	4	6	8	-	1	-	1	-	8
18	Erwin Resch	Austria	24	8	8	-	-	8	-	-	-	-	-
19	Franck Piccard	France	21	-	-	-	-	-	-	-	-	12	9
20	Jan Einar Thorsen	Norway	20	-	-	-	-	3	-	2	7	2	6
21	Gustav Oehrli	Switzerland	19	-	-	-	-	-	-	-	12	7	-
22	Roman Rupp	Austria	15	-	-	-	-	15	-	-	-	-	-
23	Gerhard Pfaffenbichler	Austria	14	2	11	-	-	-	-	1	-	-	-
	Giorgio Piantanida	Italy	14	-	-	4	-	4	-	-	6	-	-
25	Peter Runggaldier	Italy	10	-	-	-	-	1	-	6	3	-	-
26	Klaus Gattermann	West Germany	9	-	9	-	-	-	-	-	-	-	-
27	Stefan Krauß	West Germany	8	-	8	-	-	-	-	-	-	-	-
	Günther Mader	Austria	8	-	-	5	3	-	-	-	-	-	-
29	Danilo Sbardellotto	Italy	7	-	-	-	-	-	2	-	-	5	-
30	Felix Belczyk	Canada	6	-	3	-	-	-	-	3	-	-	-
31	Graham Bell	United Kingdom	5	-	5	-	-	-	-	-	-	-	-
	Peter Dürr	West Germany	5	-	-	-	5	-	-	-	-	-	-
	Brian Stemmle	Canada	5	1	-	-	4	-	-	-	-	-	-
34	Philipp Schuler	Switzerland	2	-	2	-	-	-	-	-	-	-	-
	Lars-Börje Eriksson	Sweden	2	-	-	2	-	-	-	-	-	-	-
	Bernhard Fahner	Switzerland	2	-	-	-	2	-	-	-	-	-	-
	Robbie Bosinger	Canada	2	-	-	-	-	-	-	-	2	-	-
	Hannes Zehentner	West Germany	2	-	-	-	-	-	-	-	-	-	2

== Men's downhill team results ==
bold indicate highest score - italics indicate race wins

Place	Country	Total points	4 (Italy)	5 (Italy)	9 (Austria)	11 (Switzerland)	14 (Austria)	15 (Austria)	19 (Switzerland)	20 (Switzerland)	23 (United States)	26 (Canada)	Racers	Wins
1	Switzerland	447	43	39	38	18	38	**65**	40	52	54	60	9	3
2	Austria	404	57	**65**	55	63	47	34	16	10	34	23	9	3
3	Luxembourg	139	-	-	12	7	25	20	25	25	20	5	1	3
4	West Germany	131	19	17	10	26	-	-	30	19	8	2	6	0
5	Italy	105	3	6	15	12	25	10	13	13	8	-	4	0
6	Canada	81	16	3	-	4	-	10	12	11	-	25	4	1
7	Norway	48	-	4	6	8	3	1	2	8	2	14	2	0
8	France	21	-	-	-	-	-	-	-	-	12	9	1	0
9	United Kingdom	5	-	5	-	-	-	-	-	-	-	-	1	0
10	Sweden	2	-	-	2	-	-	-	-	-	-	-	1	0

**Alpine Skiing World Cup**
**Men**

Overall | Downhill | Super G | Giant slalom | Slalom | Combined

**1989**
