= 1988 Alpine Skiing World Cup – Men's combined =

1988 Combined World Cup
| Previous: 1987 | Next: 1989 |

Men's combined World Cup 1987/1988

== Final point standings ==
In men's combined World Cup 1987/88 both results count.

| Place | Name | Country | Total points | 15 (Austria) | 27 (Sweden) |
|---|---|---|---|---|---|
| 1 | Hubert Strolz | Austria | 40 | 25 | 15 |
| 2 | Günther Mader | Austria | 37 | 12 | 25 |
| 3 | Franck Piccard | France | 27 | 15 | 12 |
| 4 | Markus Wasmeier | West Germany | 20 | 20 | - |
| | Pirmin Zurbriggen | Switzerland | 20 | - | 20 |
| 6 | Peter Jurko | Czechoslovakia | 11 | 11 | - |
| | Lars-Göran Halvarsson | Sweden | 11 | - | 11 |
| | Denis Rey | France | 11 | 8 | 3 |
| 9 | Ole Kristian Furuseth | Norway | 10 | 10 | - |
| | Peter Müller | Switzerland | 10 | - | 10 |
| 11 | Torjus Berge | Norway | 9 | 9 | - |
| | Lars-Börje Eriksson | Sweden | 9 | - | 9 |
| 13 | Franz Heinzer | Switzerland | 8 | - | 8 |
| 14 | Felix McGrath | United States | 7 | 7 | - |
| | Xavier Gigandet | Switzerland | 7 | - | 7 |
| 16 | Marian Bíreš | Czechoslovakia | 6 | 6 | - |
| | Rob Boyd | Canada | 6 | - | 6 |
| 18 | Berni Huber | West Germany | 5 | 5 | - |
| | Jeff Olson | United States | 5 | - | 5 |
| 20 | William Besse | Switzerland | 4 | 4 | - |
| | Luc Genolet | Switzerland | 4 | - | 4 |
| 22 | Steven Lee | Australia | 3 | 3 | - |
| 23 | Ralf Socher | Canada | 2 | 2 | - |
| | Bill Hudson | United States | 2 | - | 2 |
| 25 | Mats Bødker | Denmark | 1 | 1 | - |
| | Mike Brown | United States | 1 | - | 1 |

Alpine skiing World Cup
Men

Overall | Downhill | Super G | Giant slalom | Slalom | Combined

1988
