= 1988 Alpine Skiing World Cup – Men's downhill =

1988 Men's Downhill World Cup
Previous: 1987	Next: 1989

Men's downhill World Cup 1987/1988

== Final point standings ==
In men's downhill World Cup 1987/88 all results count.

Place	Name	Country	Total points	3 (France)	4 (Italy)	10 (France)	13 (Austria)	17 (Switzerland)	18 (Switzerland)	20 (Austria)	22 (United States)	23 (United States)	26 (Sweden)
1	Pirmin Zurbriggen	Switzerland	122	20	20	25	20	-	3	25	5	-	4
2	Michael Mair	Italy	108	15	11	11	4	25	8	-	12	10	12
3	Franz Heinzer	Switzerland	94	7	-	-	-	-	20	20	25	7	15
	Rob Boyd	Canada	94	11	25	-	11	7	9	-	10	11	10
5	Peter Müller	Switzerland	90	6	7	1	25	-	-	6	11	25	9
6	Daniel Mahrer	Switzerland	64	25	2	-	-	-	25	12	-	-	-
7	Marc Girardelli	Luxembourg	59	4	10	15	-	-	-	-	15	15	-
	Christophe Plé	France	59	10	-	10	-	10	-	-	20	9	-
9	Karl Alpiger	Switzerland	50	12	-	6	2	-	-	-	2	3	25
10	Danilo Sbardellotto	Italy	42	9	-	-	6	-	7	-	-	-	20
	Leonhard Stock	Austria	42	-	9	9	12	-	-	-	-	5	7
	Franck Piccard	France	42	-	-	12	15	-	-	10	-	-	5
13	Felix Belczyk	Canada	38	-	6	-	-	11	12	-	-	9	-
14	Markus Wasmeier	West Germany	37	8	8	-	10	-	-	-	-	-	11
15	Donald Stevens	Canada	33	-	-	-	-	-	-	-	6	20	7
16	Anton Steiner	Austria	29	-	-	20	-	-	-	9	-	-	-
17	Peter Wirnsberger	Austria	25	3	-	-	-	-	-	2	-	12	8
18	Giorgio Piantanida	Italy	24	-	-	4	-	20	-	-	-	-	-
19	Brian Stemmle	Canada	23	1	15	7	-	-	-	-	-	-	-
	Atle Skårdal	Norway	23	-	-	-	9	3	-	11	-	-	-
	Armin Assinger	Austria	23	-	4	-	5	-	-	4	7	1	2
22	Lars-Börje Eriksson	Sweden	22	-	-	-	-	8	10	-	4	-	-
23	Peter Dürr	West Germany	19	-	1	-	3	-	-	15	-	-	-
	William Besse	Switzerland	19	-	-	9	7	-	-	3	-	-	-
25	Bernhard Fahner	Switzerland	17	-	-	-	-	12	-	5	-	-	-
26	Gerhard Pfaffenbichler	Austria	16	-	-	-	8	-	-	8	-	-	-
27	Werner Perathoner	Italy	15	-	-	-	-	15	-	-	-	-	-
	Igor Cigolla	Italy	15	-	-	-	-	-	15	-	-	-	-
29	Daniel Moar	Canada	14	-	-	-	-	6	-	-	8	-	-
30	Jan Einar Thorsen	Norway	12	-	12	-	-	-	-	-	-	-	-
	Gustav Oehrli	Switzerland	12	-	1	-	-	-	11	-	-	-	-
32	Philippe Verneret	France	10	-	-	3	1	-	-	-	-	6	-
33	Luc Genolet	Switzerland	9	-	-	-	-	9	-	-	-	-	-
	Robbie Bosinger	Canada	9	-	-	-	-	-	-	-	9	-	-
35	Hans-Jörg Tauscher	West Germany	8	-	3	5	-	-	-	-	-	-	-
36	Martin Bell	United Kingdom	7	-	-	-	-	-	-	7	-	-	-
37	Graham Bell	United Kingdom	6	-	-	-	-	-	6	-	-	-	-
	Helmut Höflehner	Austria	6	-	-	2	-	-	-	-	-	4	-
	Luc Alphand	France	6	5	-	-	-	-	-	-	-	1	-
40	Willibald Zechner	Austria	5	-	5	-	-	-	-	-	-	-	-
	Berni Huber	West Germany	5	-	-	-	-	5	-	-	-	-	-
	Jeff Olson	United States	5	-	-	-	-	-	5	-	-	-	-
	Luigi Colturi	Italy	5	-	-	-	-	2	-	-	3	-	-
44	A. J. Kitt	United States	4	-	-	-	-	4	-	-	-	-	-
	Shinya Chiba	Japan	4	-	-	-	-	-	4	-	-	-	-
46	Steven Lee	Australia	3	-	-	-	-	-	1	-	2	-	-
	Holje Tefre	Norway	3	-	-	-	-	-	-	-	-	-	3
48	Sepp Wildgruber	West Germany	2	2	-	-	-	-	-	-	-	-	-
	Stefan Krauß	West Germany	2	-	-	-	-	-	2	-	-	-	-
	Hannes Zehentner	West Germany	2	-	-	-	-	1	-	1	-	-	-
	Günther Mader	Austria	2	-	-	-	-	-	-	-	-	2	-
52	Pietro Vitalini	Italy	1	-	-	-	-	-	-	-	-	-	1

Alpine skiing World Cup
Men

Overall | Downhill | Super G | Giant | Slalom | Combined

1988
