= Fahner =

Fahner is a surname. Notable people with the surname include:

- Bernhard Fahner (born 1963), Swiss alpine skier and Olympian
- Thomas Fahner (born 1966), German athletics competitor
- Tyrone C. Fahner (1942–2024), American lawyer and politician
