= Piantanida =

Piantanida is an Italian surname. Notable people with the surname include:

- Giorgio Piantanida (born 1967), Italian alpine skier
- Nick Piantanida (1932–1966), American amateur parachute jumper
