= William Besse =

Swiss alpine skier

William Besse (born 10 March 1968 in Bruson) is a Swiss former alpine skier. He took four wins and 13 podiums in the FIS Alpine Ski World Cup, all of them in the downhill discipline, including winning the Lauberhorn downhill in Wengen in 1994. He retired from competition in 1999, in part because he struggled to adapt to the introduction of carving skis in the mid-1990s. After retiring from competition, he became a ski instructor in Verbier, and also worked as an analyst for Télévision Suisse Romande and Radio Télévision Suisse's coverage of alpine skiing, until he was let go after the 2014-15 season.

He is related to alpine skier Justin Murisier through Murisier's father, who is Besse's cousin.

== Competitions ==
Olympic Games

- Alpine skiing at the 1992 Winter Olympics – Men's combined
- Alpine skiing at the 1994 Winter Olympics – Men's downhill
- Alpine skiing at the 1994 Winter Olympics – Men's super-G

Alpine Skiing World Cup

- 1988 Alpine Skiing World Cup – Men's combined
- 1988 Alpine Skiing World Cup – Men's downhill
- 1989 Alpine Skiing World Cup – Men's combined
- 1989 Alpine Skiing World Cup – Men's downhill
- 1989 Alpine Skiing World Cup – Men's overall
- 1990 Alpine Skiing World Cup – Men's combined
- 1990 Alpine Skiing World Cup – Men's downhill
- 1990 Alpine Skiing World Cup – Men's overall
- 1991 Alpine Skiing World Cup – Men's combined
- 1991 Alpine Skiing World Cup – Men's downhill
- 1991 Alpine Skiing World Cup – Men's overall
- 1992 Alpine Skiing World Cup – Men's combined
- 1992 Alpine Skiing World Cup – Men's downhill
- 1992 Alpine Skiing World Cup – Men's super G
- 1993 Alpine Skiing World Cup – Men's combined
- 1993 Alpine Skiing World Cup – Men's downhill
- 1993 Alpine Skiing World Cup – Men's super G
- 1994 Alpine Skiing World Cup – Men's downhill
- 1994 Alpine Skiing World Cup – Men's super G
- 1995 Alpine Skiing World Cup – Men's downhill
- 1995 Alpine Skiing World Cup – Men's super G
- 1996 Alpine Skiing World Cup – Men's downhill
- 1996 Alpine Skiing World Cup – Men's super G

== See also ==
- Switzerland at the 1992 Winter Olympics
- Switzerland at the 1994 Winter Olympics
