= Ole Kristian Furuseth =

Norwegian alpine skier (born 1967)

Personal information
- Born: 7 January 1967 (age 59) Jessheim, Norway

Skiing career
- Sport: Alpine skiing
- Club: Ullensaker Ski Klubb
- Retired: 2002
- Disciplines: Technical events, Super-G
- World Cup debut: 1987

Olympics
- Teams: 3
- Medals: 1

World Championships
- Teams: 6
- Medals: 1

World Cup
- Seasons: 16
- Wins: 9
- Podiums: 32
- Discipline titles: 2
Medal record
Men's alpine skiing
Representing Norway
World Cup race podiums
Event	1st	2nd	3rd
Slalom	6	9	7
Giant slalom	3	5	0
Super-G	0	1	0
Combined	0	1	0
Total	9	16	7
Olympic Games
Silver medal – second place	1998 Nagano	Slalom
World Championships
Bronze medal – third place	1991 Saalbach	Slalom

Ole Kristian Furuseth (born 7 January 1967) is a retired Norwegian alpine skier. He scored his first World Cup victory in Furano in 1989 and his final World Cup victory in Bormio in 2000, and in total he has three World Cup victories in giant slalom and six in slalom. Furuseth won a bronze medal in the slalom competition at the 1991 World Championships in Saalbach, and a silver medal at the 1998 Olympics in Nagano.

== Early life and career ==
Born in Oslo, he represented the skiing club Ullensaker SK.

His first international competition was the 1985 Junior World Championships, in which he finished eleventh in downhill and nineteenth in giant slalom. He made his World Cup debut in January 1986, finishing 46th in the slalom race in Sankt Anton, Austria . He did not compete in any World Cup races in the 1987 calendar year, but returned in the late 1987–88 season with a sixth and fifteenth place in Bad Kleinkirchheim and Oppdal, respectively.

== International breakthrough ==
In the 1988–89 season Furuseth performed consistently well. He opened with a ninth place in Sestriere in December, then improved gradually until reaching the podium for the first time, with a second place from Adelboden in January. He also won the slalom run in the Alpine combined Event at the FIS Alpine Skiing World Championships. On 3 March in Furano, he finished second in the giant slalom, winning the slalom race two days later. One week later in Shigakogen, he won the giant slalom race and finished second in the slalom. As a result, he won the Giant slalom Cup that year, though jointly with Pirmin Zurbriggen. In the Slalom Cup he finished third, and in the overall standings he finished fourth. He also competed at the 1989 World Championships, placing eighth in the giant slalom and sixth in the slalom. He was given the Norwegian Sportsperson of the Year award of 1989.

The 1989–90 season started equally well, with two-second places in August in Thredbo. He then won his next race, a giant slalom competition in Park City in November. Although that would be his only victory that season, he became runner-up in three further races, including the super-G race in January in Les Menuires. He again won the Giant slalom Cup, finished second in the overall standings and second in the Slalom Cup.

In the 1990–91 season he performed best in the slalom. He won competitions in Madonna di Campiglio and Kranjska Gora in December, and recorded three-second places, only one of them in giant slalom. Again he finished second in the Slalom Cup. At the 1991 World Championships, he won the bronze medal in slalom and placed fourth in both giant slalom and super-G.

The 1991–92 season saw Furuseth compete more, but top-three achievements were somewhat more few and far between. He won a giant slalom race in Adelboden in January, finished second in a combined race in Garmisch-Partenkirchen the week before, and finished third in a slalom race in Sestriere in December. At the 1992 Winter Olympics, he finished fifth in the giant slalom, fourth in the super-G and seventh in the combined race. The 1992–93 season was a disappointment with mediocre results, although he did place twice among the top ten towards the end of the season. At the 1993 World Championships he finished fourteenth in slalom and tenth in giant slalom. In the 1993–94 World Cup circuit he placed mostly in the 20th–30th range, with results as bad as a 61st place in Val d'Isère in December. However, the misère in Val d'Isère was followed by a third place in Sestriere only two days later. He also recorded a second place in Kranjska Gora in January.

Results improved again in the 1994–95 season. Although he opened with a 23rd place in giant slalom in Tignes in December, he achieved fourth place in slalom the next day. In slalom he recorded two third places; in Kitzbühel in January and Furano in February; he then won his last race for the season, in Bormio in March. In the 1995–96 World Cup he was disqualified in most of his races, failing to reach the podium. He participated in the 1996 World Championships, postponed from 1995, and finished seventh in the slalom race. He performed slightly better in 1996–97, with one third place in slalom in Shigakogen in March and a fourth place at the 1997 World Championships - a race won by fellow countryman Tom Stiansen - as highlights.

From the 1997–98 season, Furuseth competed exclusively in slalom. He opened with a thirteenth place in Park City in November, but improved gradually until reaching third in Kitzbühel in January. Then, in February he won a silver medal at the 1998 Winter Olympics, only defeated by fellow countryman Hans Petter Buraas. A World Cup victory in Yongpyong on 1 March rounded off a successful season. A mediocre 1998–99 season followed, but in 1999–2000 fully reinvigorated his career, achieving two fourth places, one third places, three-second places and one victory in the World Cup. The victory was his last race of the season, Bormio in March. He reached old heights with a second place in the Slalom Cup.

However, the results were not followed up in the 2000–01 season. A fifth place in Åre in February was his best World Cup result; also he finished eleventh at the 2001 World Championships. Following the 2001–02 season, where he only reached the top ten once during the season, namely in the 2002 Winter Olympics, Furuseth retired from active alpine skiing.

=== World Cup competition victories ===
Date	Location	Race
5 March 1989	Furano	Slalom
9 March 1989	Shigakogen	Giant slalom
23 November 1989	Park City	Giant slalom
18 December 1990	Madonna di Campiglio	Slalom
22 December 1990	Kranjska Gora	Slalom
21 January 1991	Adelboden	Giant slalom
19 January 1996	Bormio	Slalom
1 March 1998	Yongpyong	Slalom
19 March 2000	Bormio	Slalom

== Gear ==
Furuseth used skis and boots from Nordica, bindings from Tyrolia and ski poles from Scott USA.

== Post-sporting career ==
After his active sporting career, Furuseth has turned to a business career. He has made his mark in construction, among others as a real estate developer at the ski resort Kvitfjell. He has cooperated with his brothers Paal Mogens and Jon Emil Furuseth.

Furuseth is married, and resides in Oslo. His hobbies include boat trips and surfing.

Awards
Preceded by Jon Rønningen	Norwegian Sportsperson of the Year; 1989	Succeeded by Atle Skårdal
