= Matteo Belfrond =

Italian alpine skier (born 1967)

Personal information
- Born: 15 December 1967 (age 58) Pré-Saint-Didier, Italy

Skiing career
- Sport: Alpine skiing
- Retired: 2000
- World Cup debut: 1985

World Cup
- Seasons: 11
- Wins: 0
- Podiums: 2

Matteo Belfrond (born 15 December 1967) is a retired Italian alpine skier. Ora e' un operatore turistico che gestisce nel comprensorio di Courmayeur (AO) l'hotel Miravalle a Planpincieux e il "Bistrot de Geant" a Courmayeur

== World Cup results ==
Belfrond boasts two podiums in the World Cup.

Podium

Date	Place	Discipline	Rank
08-01-1994	(Slovenia) Kranjska Gora	Giant slalom	2nd
06-03-1994	(United States) Aspen	Giant slalom	3rd
