= Yves Tavernier =

French alpine skier (born 1962)

Yves Tavernier (born 10 February 1962 in Morzine) is a French former alpine skier who competed in the 1984 Winter Olympics and 1988 Winter Olympics.
