= Michael Eder =

German alpine skier (born 1961)

Personal information
- Nationality: German
- Born: 23 May 1961 (age 64); Berchtesgaden, West Germany

Sport
- Sport: Alpine skiing

Michael Eder (born 23 May 1961) is a German alpine skier. He competed in the men's super-G at the 1988 Winter Olympics.
