= Roman Rupp =

Austrian alpine skier (born 1964)

Roman Rupp (born 25 January 1964) is an Austrian former alpine skier.
