= Florian Beck =

German alpine skier

Personal information
- Born: 7 January 1958 (age 68) Gunzesried, West Germany

Skiing career
- Sport: Alpine skiing
- Club: SC Gunzesried
- Retired: 1996
- Disciplines: Technical events
- World Cup debut: 1984

Olympics
- Teams: 2

World Championships
- Teams: 1

World Cup
- Seasons: 13
- Podiums: 1
Medal record
Men's alpine skiing
Representing West Germany
World Cup race podiums
Event	1st	2nd	3rd
Slalom	0	1	0

Florian Beck (born 7 January 1958) is a German former alpine skier who competed in the 1984 Winter Olympics and 1988 Winter Olympics.

== Career ==
During his career he has achieved 6 results among the top 10 (1 podium) in the World Cup.

== World Cup results ==
Top 10

Date	Place	Discipline	Rank
11-12-1988	(Italy) Madonna di Campiglio	Slalom	10
11-03-1986	(United States) Heavenly Valley	Slalom	9
04-01-1985	(Germany) Bad Wiessee	Slalom	2
02-12-1984	(Italy) Sestriere	Slalom	8
17-01-1984	(Switzerland) Parpan	Slalom	9
30-01-1983	(Socialist Federal Republic of Yugoslavia) Kranjska Gora	Slalom	10
