= Peter Wirnsberger II =

Austrian alpine skier (born 1958)

Peter Wirnsberger
Personal information
- Born: 20 September 1968 Rennweg am Katschberg, Austria
- Died: 20 December 1992 (age 33)

Skiing career
- Sport: Alpine skiing
- Retired: 1992
- Disciplines: Soeed events
- World Cup debut: 1989

World Cup
- Seasons: 3

Peter Wirnsberger II, so called to distinguish him from the just homonymous Peter Wirnsberger (born 13 September 1958) was an Austrian former alpine skier. He died in a skiing accident in 1992.

== World Cup results ==
Top 10

Date	Place	Discipline	Position
21-01-1990	(Austria) Kitzbuehel	Combined	7
