= Hans Stuffer =

German alpine skier (born 1961)

Personal information
- Born: 11 April 1961 (age 65) Samerberg, Germany

Skiing career
- Sport: Alpine skiing
- Retired: 1990
- Disciplines: Technical events
- World Cup debut: 1985

World Championships
- Teams: 2

World Cup
- Seasons: 5
- Podiums: 3

Hans Stuffer (born 11 April 1961) is a German former alpine skier.

He participated at two editions of the Alpine Ski World Championships.

== World Cup results ==
Podium

Date	Place	Discipline	Position
10-03-1990	(Norway) Hemsedal	Super G	3
27-02-1986	(Norway) Hemsedal	Giant Slalom	2
27-01-1985	(Germany) Garmisch-Partenkirchen	Super G	3
