= Martin Knöri =

Swiss alpine skier (born 1966)

Martin Knöri (born 1966) is a Swiss retired alpine skier.

He made his World Cup debut in November 1986 in Sestriere, collecting his first World Cup points with a 5th place. He managed three more top-10 placements throughout his World Cup career, including another 5th place in December 1990 in Kranjska Gora. His last World Cup outing came in January 1994 in Crans Montana.
