= Marian Bíreš =

Slovak alpine skier (born 1964)

Marian Bíreš (born 27 July 1964 in Banská Bystrica) is a retired Slovak alpine skier who competed for Czechoslovakia in the 1992 Winter Olympics.
