= Giovanni Moro (skier) =

Italian alpine skier (born 1967)

Personal information
- Born: August 29, 1967 (age 58) Peia, Italy

Skiing career
- Sport: Alpine skiing
- Retired: 1990
- World Cup debut: 1987

World Cup
- Seasons: 4

Giovanni Moro (born 29 August 1967) is an Italian former alpine skier.

== World Cup results ==
Top 10

Date	Place	Discipline	Position
27-11-1987	(Italy) Sestriere	Slalom	8
12-01-1990	(Austria) Schladming	Slalom	9
