= Luca Pesando =

Italian alpine skier (born 1966)

Personal information
- Born: 20 April 1966 (age 60) Bardonecchia, Italy

Skiing career
- Sport: Alpine skiing
- Club: C.S. Carabinieri
- Retired: 1995
- Disciplines: Technical events
- World Cup debut: 1988

World Cup
- Seasons: 7

Luca Pesando (born 20 April 1966) is an Italian former alpine skier.

== World Cup results ==
Top 15

Date	Place	Discipline	Position
09-08-1990	(New Zealand) Mount Hutt	Giant Slalom	9
24-03-1988	(Austria) Saalbach-Hinterglemm	Super G	8
