= Denis Rey =

French alpine skier (born 1966)

Denis Rey (born 9 February 1966 in La Tronche) is a retired French alpine skier who competed in the 1992 Winter Olympics, finishing 27th in the men's downhill.
