= Gerhard Pfaffenbichler =

Austrian alpine skier (born 1961)

Gerhard Pfaffenbichler (born 26 March 1961 in Salzburg) is an Austrian former alpine skier who competed in the 1988 Winter Olympics.
