= Sašo Robič =

Slovenian alpine skier (1967–2010)

Personal information
- Born: May 5, 1967 Slovenia, Yugoslavia
- Died: August 7, 2010 (aged 43)

Sport
- Sport: Skiing

World Cup career
- Seasons: 1989–1990

Sašo Robič (5 May 1967 – 7 August 2010) was a Slovenian professional skier with limited success in the 1989 and 1990 seasons of the Alpine Skiing World Cup. He was a member, and later a coach, of the Yugoslav national skiing team.

He was the younger brother of Jure Robič.
