= Peter Jurko =

Slovak alpine skier (born 1967)

Personal information
- Born: 22 September 1967 (age 59) Nová Lesná, Czechoslovakia

Skiing career
- Sport: Alpine skiing
- Disciplines: Technical events

Peter Jurko (born 22 September 1967) is a former alpine skier who competed for Czechoslovakia in the 1988 Winter Olympics and 1992 Winter Olympics.
