= Tiger Shaw (alpine skier) =

American alpine skier (born 1961)

Gale "Tiger" Shaw III (born August 24, 1961, in Morrisville, Vermont), better known as Tiger Shaw, is an American former alpine skier who competed in the 1984 Winter Olympics and 1988 Winter Olympics.

On March 3, 2014, Shaw became president and CEO of the United States Ski and Snowboard Association, the Olympic National Governing Body for skiing and snowboarding. Tiger is married to his wife, Kristin Shaw, both of whom are graduates of Dartmouth College. They have three kids; Kara, 30, Conrad (son-in-law) 31, Gunnar, 29, and Eva, 24. Tiger's brother Andrew "Beach" Shaw was also a successful collegiate ski racer, winning the NCAA GS title for the University of Vermont in 1984. His parents are Mary Janet Shaw and Gale Shaw Jr. Tiger grew up in Stowe, Vermont, with his brother and his sister, Dani Shaw Virtue. Tiger now resides with his family in Park City, Utah after living in Norwich, Vermont for over twenty years. Shaw was named one of Sports Illustrated's 50 Greatest Sports Figures from Vermont in 1999.
