= Konrad Walk =

Austrian alpine skier

Personal information
- Born: 1 July 1965 (age 61) Vils, Austria

Skiing career
- Sport: Alpine skiing
- Club: SC Vils
- Retired: 1992
- Disciplines: Giant slalom
- World Cup debut: 1982

World Championships
- Teams: 1

World Cup
- Seasons: 11

Konrad Walk (born 1 July 1965 in Vils, Tyrol) is an Austrian politician and former alpine skier who won the Europa Cup overall title in 1988.

== Sporting career ==
During his career he has achieved 7 results among the top 10 in the World Cup and was 9th at the 1991 Alpine Ski World Championships.

== Political career ==
In 2015, Walk was elected Mayor of the town of Hochfilzen. Prior, to this, he had served 6 years as vice-mayor of the same town.

== World Cup results ==
Top 10

Date	Place	Discipline	Rank
9 March 1991	(United States) Aspen	Giant slalom	10
21 December 1990	(Socialist Federal Republic of Yugoslavia) Kranjska Gora	Giant slalom	9
16 December 1990	(Italy) Alta Badia	Giant slalom	7
23 January 1990	(Switzerland) Veysonnaz	Giant slalom	10
14 January 1990	(Italy) Alta Badia	Giant slalom	8
30 November 1989	(United States) Waterville Valley	Giant slalom	10
19 February 1989	(United States) Aspen	Giant slalom	10

== Europa Cup results ==
Walk has won an overall Europa Cup and one discipline cup.

- FIS Alpine Ski Europa Cup
  - Overall: 1988
  - Giant slalom: 1988
