= Stefan Krauss =

German alpine skier

Personal information
- Born: 25 June 1967 (age 59) Berchtesgaden, Germany

Skiing career
- Sport: Alpine skiing
- Retired: 1998
- Disciplines: Speed events
- World Cup debut: 1988

World Cup
- Seasons: 11

Stefan Krauss (born 25 June 1967) is a German former alpine skier.

== World Cup results ==
Top 10

Date	Place	Discipline	Position
05/02/1996	(Germany) Garmisch-Partenkirchen	Super G	4
19/01/1996	(Switzerland) Veysonnaz	Downhill	10
29/12/1995	(Italy) Bormio	Downhill	9
14/01/1995	(Austria) Kitzbuehel	Downhill	9
11/01/1990	(Austria) Schladming	Downhill	6
10/12/1988	(Italy) Val Gardena	Downhill	8
