= Giorgio Piantanida =

Italian alpine skier (born 1967)

Giorgio Piantanida (born 15 September 1967 in Busto Arsizio) is an Italian retired alpine skier.
