= Grega Benedik =

Slovenian alpine skier (born 1962)

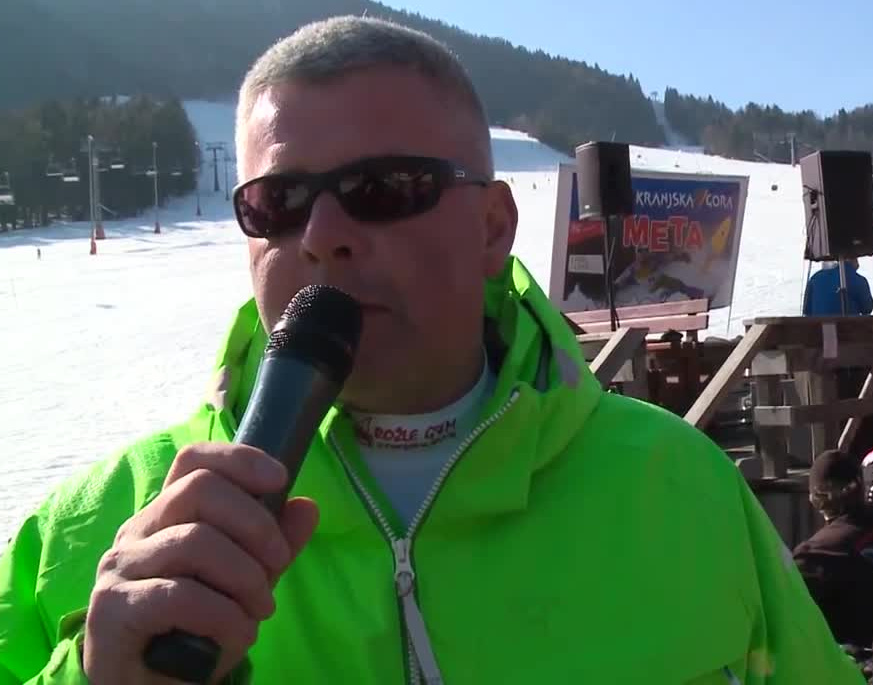

Personal information
- Born: May 11, 1962 (age 64) Žirovnica, Slovenia

Skiing career
- Sport: Alpine skiing
- Retired: 1990
- Disciplines: Super-G, giant slalom, slalom, combined
- World Cup debut: 1981

Olympics
- Teams: 1

World Championships
- Teams: 2

World Cup
- Seasons: 9
- Wins: 1
- Podiums: 1

Grega Benedik (born May 11, 1962) is a former Slovenian alpine skier who represented Yugoslavia at the Olympics in 1984 in Sarajevo and 1988 in Calgary.

== World Cup Results ==
=== Season standings ===
Season	Age	Overall	Slalom	Giant slalom	Super-G	Downhill	Combined
1981	18	87	—	—	—	—	27
1982	19	—	—	—	—	—	—
1983	20	51	—	21	—	—	—
1984	21	101	—	41	—	—	—
1985	22	—	—	—	—	—	—
1986	23	55	18	—	—	—	—
1987	24	26	5	—	—	—	—
1988	25	32	10	—	—	—	—
1989	26	46	16	—	—	—	—
1990	27	72	24	—	—	—	—

=== Race podiums ===
Season	Date	Location	Race	Position
1987	21 March 1987	(Socialist Federal Republic of Yugoslavia) Sarajevo, Yugoslavia	Slalom	1st
