= Niklas Henning =

Swedish alpine skier (born 1964)

Eric Henning
Personal information
- Nationality: Sweden
- Born: 6 March 1964 (age 62) Stockholm, Sweden

Sport
- Sport: Skiing

Eric Niklas Henning (born 6 March 1964) is a Swedish former alpine skier who competed in the 1984 and 1988 Winter Olympics. He also won a Super-G World Cup competition in Val d'Isère on 10 December 1989, which was his only World Cup competition victory.

== World Cup competition victories ==
Date	Location	Race type
10 December 1989	Val d'Isère, France	Super-G
