= Alpine skiing combined =

Event in alpine ski racing

Combined is an event in alpine ski racing. A traditional combined competition is a two-day event consisting of one run of downhill and two runs of slalom; each discipline takes place on a separate day. The winner is/are the skier(s) with the fastest aggregate time. Until the 1990s, a complicated point system was used to determine placings in the combined event.

Since then, a modified version, called either an "alpine combined" (with a downhill as the speed event) or a "super combined" (with a super-G as the speed event), has been run as an aggregate time event consisting of two runs: first, a one-run speed event and then only one run of slalom, with both portions held on the same day. Due to declining participation, the individual alpine combined was phased out of international competition in the 2020s and replaced by team combined, which is contested by pairs assigned to the downhill and slalom runs respectively.

== History ==
The first Alpine World Ski Championships in 1931 did not include the combined event, but it was added to the program in 1932. Alpine skiing at the Winter Olympics was not included until 1936, and the combined was the only event. The combined was one of three medal events at the next Olympics in 1948, along with downhill and slalom. The combined used the results of the only downhill race with two runs of combined slalom. The regular slalom (two runs) was held the following day.

With the introduction of giant slalom at the World Championships in 1950, the combined event disappeared from the Olympics for four decades, until re-introduced in 1988. From 1948 through 1980, the Winter Olympics also served as the World Championships, with two sets of medals awarded. The World Champion in the combined was determined "on paper" by the results of the three races of downhill, giant slalom, and slalom. The top three finishers in the combined event were awarded World Championship medals by the FIS, but not Olympic medals from the IOC. This three-race paper method was used from 1954 through 1980; no FIS medals were awarded for the combined in 1950 or 1952. A separate downhill and slalom for the combined event was added to the World Championships in 1982.

The World Championships were held annually from 1931 through 1939, were interrupted by World War II, and resumed as a biennial event at the 1948 Olympics, held in even-numbered years through 1982. They skipped the 1984 Olympics and have been scheduled for odd-numbered years since 1985. (The 1995 event was postponed to 1996, due to lack of snow in southeastern Spain.)

At the Winter Olympics and World Championships, the slalom and downhill portions of a combined event are run separately from the regular downhill and slalom events on shorter, and often less demanding, race courses. On the World Cup circuit, traditional combined events have been "paper races," combining skiers' times from a separately scheduled downhill race and slalom race, generally held at the same location over two days. In 2005, the FIS began to replace these "calculated" combineds with super combined events, held on one day, which administrators hoped would result in increased participation.

== Recent modifications ==
A modified version, the super combined or Alpine combined, is a speed race (downhill or super-G) and only one run of slalom, with both portions scheduled on the same day. Because slalom courses generally become slower after the first racers, recent changes to the super combined or Alpine combined events have the fastest racers from the speed race start first in the slalom run, which is a revision to the prior structure of starting the slalom run in reverse order, as is done in the second run of a traditional two-run slalom.

=== World Cup ===
The first super combined was a World Cup race held in 2005 in Wengen, Switzerland, on January 14; Benjamin Raich of Austria was the winner. The first women's race in the new format was run six weeks later in San Sicario, Italy; won by Croatia's Janica Kostelić on February 27. The 2006 World Cup calendar included three super combineds and just one traditional combined race on the men's side, while the women raced two super combineds and no traditional combineds. Kostelić won the first three women's World Cup super combineds.

Beginning with the 2007 season, the FIS began awarding a fifth discipline-champion "crystal globe" to the points winner of combined races; the 2007 season included five combined races for each gender. Nine out of the ten scheduled combineds use the new super-combined format, the only exception was Kitzbühel, Austria, which continued with the traditional two-run format (K), albeit in a "paper race." The change to super combined expectedly resulted in major disapproval from the slalom specialists, the loudest critic being Ivica Kostelić. Even with the change to a single slalom run, many speed skiers believe the technical racers have the advantage in the super combined.

=== World Championships and Winter Olympics ===
The super combined format debuted at the world championships in 2007 in Åre, Sweden, and at the Winter Olympics in 2010 at Whistler, Canada.

=== Team combined ===
The individual alpine combined was dropped from the World Cup circuit in the 2020–21 season; the discipline had been impacted by diverging developments in downhill and slalom, which made it increasingly difficult for skiers to train in both disciplines at once. The 2022 Winter Olympics saw a significant decline in participation in combined than past Games, further leaving the future of the event in doubt.

In response to this decline, the FIS developed a variant of the format known as team combined as a replacement, where pairs of skiers are assigned to downhill and slalom respectively. The team combined was first held at the World Championships during the 2025 edition in Saalbach-Hinterglemm, with Franjo von Allmen and Loïc Meillard heading a Swiss clean sweep of the podium in the men's competition and Mikaela Shiffrin taking her 15th Worlds medal by winning gold for the United States in the women's event alongside Breezy Johnson, tying with Christl Cranz as the skier with the most medals in the championships' history.

The team combined made its Olympic debut in 2026, with the inaugural men's competition won by Franjo von Allmen and Tanguy Nef of Switzerland, and the women's competition won by Ariane Rädler and Katharina Huber of Austria.

== Men's World Cup podiums ==
In the following table men's combined (super combined from 2007) World Cup podiums in the World Cup since first edition in 1976.

Season	1st	2nd	3rd
1975	not awarded		
1976	(Switzerland) Walter Tresch	(Italy) Gustav Thöni	(Canada) Jim Hunter
1977	not awarded		
1978	not contested		
1979	not awarded		
1980	(United States) Phil Mahre	(Liechtenstein) Andreas Wenzel	(Austria) Anton Steiner
1981	(United States) Phil Mahre	(Liechtenstein) Andreas Wenzel	(Switzerland) Peter Müller
1982	(United States) Phil Mahre	(Liechtenstein) Andreas Wenzel	(Norway) Even Hole
1983	(United States) Phil Mahre	(Switzerland) Peter Lüscher	(Luxembourg) Marc Girardelli
1984	(Liechtenstein) Andreas Wenzel	(Switzerland) Pirmin Zurbriggen	(Austria) Anton Steiner
1985	(Liechtenstein) Andreas Wenzel	(Switzerland) Franz Heinzer	(Switzerland) Peter Müller
1986	(Switzerland) Pirmin Zurbriggen	(Luxembourg) Marc Girardelli	(West Germany) Markus Wasmeier
1987	(Switzerland) Pirmin Zurbriggen	(Liechtenstein) Andreas Wenzel	
1988	(Austria) Hubert Strolz	(Austria) Günther Mader	(France) Franck Piccard
1989	(Luxembourg) Marc Girardelli	(West Germany) Markus Wasmeier	(Switzerland) Pirmin Zurbriggen
1990	(Switzerland) Pirmin Zurbriggen	(Switzerland) Paul Accola	(West Germany) Markus Wasmeier
1991	(Luxembourg) Marc Girardelli	(Norway) Lasse Kjus	(Austria) Günther Mader
1992	(Switzerland) Paul Accola	(Austria) Hubert Strolz	(Germany) Markus Wasmeier
1993	(Luxembourg) Marc Girardelli	(Austria) Günther Mader	(Norway) Kjetil André Aamodt
1994	(Norway) Kjetil André Aamodt	(Norway) Lasse Kjus	(Norway) Harald Strand Nilsen
1995	(Luxembourg) Marc Girardelli	(Norway) Harald Strand Nilsen	(Norway) Lasse Kjus
1996	(Austria) Günther Mader	(Luxembourg) Marc Girardelli	(Italy) Alessandro Fattori
1997	(Norway) Kjetil André Aamodt	(Norway) Lasse Kjus (Austria) Günther Mader	
1998	(Austria) Werner Franz	(Norway) Kjetil André Aamodt (Austria) Hermann Maier	
1999	(Norway) Kjetil André Aamodt (Norway) Lasse Kjus		(Austria) Werner Franz
2000	(Norway) Kjetil André Aamodt	(Austria) Hermann Maier	(Sweden) Fredrik Nyberg
2001	(Norway) Lasse Kjus	(Norway) Kjetil André Aamodt (Austria) Michael Walchhofer	
2002	(Norway) Kjetil André Aamodt	(Norway) Lasse Kjus	(Slovenia) Andrej Jerman
2003	(United States) Bode Miller	(Norway) Kjetil André Aamodt (Austria) Michael Walchhofer	
2004	(United States) Bode Miller	(Austria) Benjamin Raich	(Norway) Lasse Kjus
2005	(Austria) Benjamin Raich	(Norway) Lasse Kjus	(Switzerland) Didier Défago
2006	(Austria) Benjamin Raich	(United States) Bode Miller (Austria) Michael Walchhofer	
2007	(Norway) Aksel Lund Svindal	(Switzerland) Marc Berthod	(Croatia) Ivica Kostelić
2008	(United States) Bode Miller	(Croatia) Ivica Kostelić	(Switzerland) Daniel Albrecht
2009	(Switzerland) Carlo Janka	(Switzerland) Silvan Zurbriggen	(Austria) Romed Baumann
2010	(Austria) Benjamin Raich	(Switzerland) Carlo Janka	(Croatia) Ivica Kostelić
2011	(Croatia) Ivica Kostelić	(Italy) Christof Innerhofer	(Norway) Kjetil Jansrud
2012	(Croatia) Ivica Kostelić	(Switzerland) Beat Feuz	(Austria) Romed Baumann
2013	(Croatia) Ivica Kostelić (France) Alexis Pinturault		(France) Thomas Mermillod Blondin
2014	(United States) Ted Ligety (France) Alexis Pinturault		(France) Thomas Mermillod Blondin
2015	(Switzerland) Carlo Janka	(France) Alexis Pinturault	(France) Victor Muffat-Jeandet
2016	(France) Alexis Pinturault	(France) Thomas Mermillod Blondin	(Norway) Kjetil Jansrud
2017	(France) Alexis Pinturault	(Switzerland) Niels Hintermann	(Norway) Aleksander Aamodt Kilde
2018	(Italy) Peter Fill	(Norway) Kjetil Jansrud	(France) Victor Muffat-Jeandet
2019	(France) Alexis Pinturault	(Austria) Marco Schwarz	(Switzerland) Mauro Caviezel
2020	(France) Alexis Pinturault	(Norway) Aleksander Aamodt Kilde	(Austria) Matthias Mayer
