= Felix Belczyk =

Canadian alpine skier (born 1961)

Felix Belczyk (born 11 August 1961) is a Canadian former alpine skier who competed in the 1988 Winter Olympics and 1992 Winter Olympics.

Belczyk was born on 11 August 1961 in Calgary, Alberta. He was a member of the Canadian National Alpine Ski team from 1982 to 1992 competing in downhill and super-G. On the World Cup circuit, took first place in super-G at Leukerbad, Switzerland in 1988 and placed third in the downhill race at Are, Sweden in 1990.

Belczyk competed for Canada in two Winter Olympic Games. At the 1988 Winter Olympics in Calgary, he competed in downhill, super-G and the combined. In the combined event, he placed third in the downhill portion but missed a gate in the slalom and was disqualified. In the downhill event, he finished eighteenth with a time of 2:03.59. He placed nineteenth in the super-G event with a time of 1:44.31.

At the 1992 Winter Olympics in Albertville, he competed in downhill.
