= Bob Ormsby =

American alpine skier (born 1963)

Bob Ormsby (born May 20, 1963 in Contra Costa County, California) is an American former alpine skier who competed in the 1988 Winter Olympics.
