= Roberto Grigis =

Italian alpine skier (born 1962)

Roberto Grigis (born 16 September 1962 in Bergamo) is a retired Italian alpine skier who competed in the 1984 Winter Olympics.
