= Berni Huber =

German alpine skier (born 1967)

Berni Huber (born 11 July 1967 in Obermaiselstein) is a German retired alpine skier who competed in the 1992 Winter Olympics.
