= Marco Tonazzi =

Italian alpine skier (born 1961)

Marco Tonazzi (born 28 January 1961) is an Italian former alpine skier.

== Career ==
Tonazzi competed in FIS World Cup events during the period from 1980 to 1989. His highest World Cup finish was second place in the giant slalom at Adelboden in 1986.
