= Armin Bittner =

German alpine skier

Personal information
- Born: 28 November 1964 (age 61) Krün, West Germany
- Height: 1.85 m (6 ft 1 in)

Skiing career
- Sport: Alpine skiing
- Retired: 1994
- Disciplines: Technical events
- World Cup debut: 1986

Olympics
- Teams: 3

World Championships
- Teams: 3
- Medals: 2

World Cup
- Seasons: 9
- Wins: 7
- Podiums: 19
- Discipline titles: 2
Medal record
Men's alpine skiing
Representing Germany
World Cup race podiums
Event	1st	2nd	3rd
Slalom	7	4	7
Giant slalom	0	0	1
Total	7	4	8
World Championships
Silver medal – second place	1989 Vail	Slalom
Bronze medal – third place	1987 Crans-Montana	Slalom

Armin Bittner (born 28 November 1964) is a German former alpine skier.

In the Alberto Tomba era, Bittner was a difficult opponent for the Italian and beat him twice in slalom – in 1989 and 1990.

== Career ==
He won a total of 7 Alpine Skiing World Cup races, all in Slalom. He competed in the 1988, 1992, and 1994 Winter Olympic Games, but did not win any medals.

== World Cup victories ==
=== World Cups ===
Season	Discipline
1989	Slalom
1990	Slalom

=== Individual races ===
Date	Location	Race
21 December 1986	(Austria) Hinterstoder	Slalom
21 December 1988	(Austria) St. Anton	Slalom
January 15, 1989	(Austria) Kitzbühel	Slalom
August 12, 1989	(Australia) Thredbo	Slalom
6 January 1990	(Slovenia) Kranjska Gora	Slalom
January 12, 1990	(Austria) Schladming	Slalom
March 4, 1990	(Switzerland) Veysonnaz	Slalom
