= Tetsuya Okabe =

Japanese alpine skier (born 1965)

Personal information
- Born: 15 May 1965 (age 61) (Japan) Otaru, Hokkaido

Skiing career
- Sport: Alpine skiing
- Retired: 1995
- Disciplines: Slalom
- World Cup debut: 1985

Olympics
- Teams: 2 – (1988–92)

World Cup
- Podiums: 2 – (2 SL)
Medal record
Men's alpine skiing
Representing Japan
Asian Winter Games
Gold medal – first place	1986 Sapporo	Giant slalom

Tetsuya Okabe (岡部哲也, Okabe Tetsuya; born 15 May 1965) is a Japanese former alpine skier who competed in the 1988 Winter Olympics, and 1992 Winter Olympics.
