= Ivano Camozzi =

Italian alpine skier (born 1962)

Ivano Camozzi (born 12 April 1962) is an Italian former alpine skier who competed in the 1988 Winter Olympics. He came 4th in the Giant Slalom event, won by compatriot Alberto Tomba.

He was married to former alpine skier Michela Figini.
