= Bernhard Fahner =

Swiss alpine skier (born 1963)

Bernhard Fahner (born 4 July 1963 in Bern) is a Swiss retired alpine skier who competed in the 1988 Winter Olympics, finishing 15th in the Men's combined.
