= Patrick Staub =

Swiss alpine skier (born 1967)

Patrick Staub (born 5 June 1967 in Gstaad) is a Swiss former alpine skier who competed in the 1992 Winter Olympics and 1994 Winter Olympics.
