= Carlo Gerosa =

Italian alpine skier (born 1964)

Personal information
- Born: 30 November 1964 (age 61) Seriate, Italy

Skiing career
- Sport: Alpine skiing
- Retired: 1994
- World Cup debut: 1984

Olympics
- Teams: 2

World Cup
- Seasons: 10

Carlo Gerosa (born 30 November 1964) is an Italian former alpine skier who competed in the 1988 Winter Olympics and 1992 Winter Olympics. He reached the top ten in World Cup races sixteen times.

== World Cup results ==
Top 10

| Date | Place | Discipline | Rank |
|---|---|---|---|
| 14/02/1987 | (France) Markstein | Slalom | 7 |
| 27/11/1987 | (Italy) Sestriere | Slalom | 6 |
| 16/12/1987 | (Italy) Madonna di Campiglio | Slalom | 5 |
| 26/03/1988 | (Austria) Saalbach-Hinterglemm | Slalom | 6 |
| 06/12/1988 | (Italy) Sestriere | Slalom | 10 |
| 26/02/1991 | (Norway) Oppdal | Slalom | 5 |
| 02/03/1991 | (Norway) Lillehammer | Slalom | 5 |
| 24/11/1991 | (United States) Park City, UT | Slalom | 7 |
| 30/11/1991 | (United States) Breckenridge, CO | Slalom | 10 |
| 10/12/1991 | (Italy) Sestriere | Slalom | 7 |
| 17/12/1991 | (Italy) Madonna di Campiglio | Slalom | 10 |
| 13/01/1992 | (Germany) Garmisch-Partenkirchen | Slalom | 10 |
| 26/01/1992 | (Switzerland) Wengen | Slalom | 9 |
| 22/03/1992 | (Switzerland) Crans Montana | Slalom | 6 |
| 06/12/1992 | (France) Val d'Isere | Slalom | 9 |
| 19/12/1992 | (Slovenia) Kranjska Gora | Slalom | 10 |
