= Richard Kröll =

Austrian alpine skier

Richard Kröll (15 March 1968 – 5 October 1996) was an Austrian alpine skier.

By 1984, Kröll managed to join a junior squad that was run through the International Ski Federation. From 1985 to early 1996, he obtained several achievements in alpine skiing

He finished sixth in the giant slalom at the 1985 Junior World Championships and competed in four events at the 1986 Junior World Championships, bringing home the bronze medal in giant slalom and the silver medals in slalom and combined. He later competed at two World Championships, finishing 11th in the giant slalom in 1993 and 20th in the super-G in 1996.

Kröll made his FIS Alpine Ski World Cup debut in March 1988, finishing 15th in the Saalbach-Hinterglemm giant slalom. Another 15th-place finish followed in Kirchberg in Tirol in January 1989, and he competed exclusively in the giant slalom until March 1994. Kröll's breakthrough came in the 1989–90 World Cup circuit, where he won his first start of the season, in Alta Badia in January, and also won his next race in Veysonnaz and finished third in March, again in Veysonnaz.

Following a World Cup break until November 1992, he became more regular from the 1992–93 season and managed his next podium in January 1994, finishing third in Hinterstoder. In January 1995 he managed his first top-10 outside of giant slalom, finishing sixth in the Kitzbühel super-G. He went on to win the Bormio super-G race in March 1995, and established himself in the top 15. His last World Cup race was the March 1996 super-G in Kvitfjell, the closing weekend of the 1995–96 season, where he finished 12th. Kröll never competed in a slalom or downhill World Cup race.

He died in a car accident on October 5, 1996, in Austria at age 28.
