= Jeff Olson (alpine skier) =

American alpine skier (born 1966)

Personal information
- Full name: Jeffrey Allen Olson
- Born: January 16, 1966 (age 60) Missoula, Montana, U.S.
- Height: 6 ft 0 in (183 cm)
- Weight: 196 lb (89 kg)

Sport
- Sport: Skiing
Medal record
Men's alpine skiing
Representing United States
Winter Pan American Games
Gold medal – first place	1990 Las Leñas	Giant slalom

Jeffrey Allen Olson (born January 16, 1966) is an American former alpine skier from Bozeman, Montana, who competed in the 1988 Winter Olympics and 1992 Winter Olympics.
