= Mathias Berthold =

Austrian alpine skier (born 1965)

Mathias Berthold (born 18 May 1965) is an Austrian former alpine skier who specialised in the slalom. He competed in the 1980s and 1990s. His career included twenty-three FIS World Cup starts and one FIS World Cup Podium. He subsequently became a coach, serving as coach of the German women's team for a period of seven years, culminating in the team winning three gold medals at the 2010 Winter Olympics. He was then head coach of the Austrian men's alpine skiing team for four seasons, leading them to two golds at the 2014 Winter Olympics, three overall Alpine Skiing World Cup titles (won by Marcel Hirscher) and eight World Championship medals, before announcing his departure in April 2014. Shortly afterwards the German Ski Association announced that Berthold would rejoin them as head coach for their men's alpine team.
