= Christian Gaidet =

French alpine skier (born 1963)

Christian Gaidet (born 31 December 1963 in Bourg-Saint-Maurice) is a French former alpine skier who competed in the 1988 Winter Olympics.
