= Tomaž Čižman =

Slovenian alpine skier (born 1965)

Medal record

Men's alpine skiing

World Championships
Bronze medal – third place	1989 Vail	Super-G

Tomaž Čižman (born February 13, 1965, in Črnuče) is a former Slovenian alpine skier.

== World Cup results ==
=== Season standings ===
Season	Age	Overall	Slalom	Giant slalom	Super-G	Downhill	Combined
1986	20	73	49	23	—	—	—
1987	21	63	—	20	—	—	—
1988	22	43	—	16	29	—	—
1989	23	32	—	11	16	—	—
1990	24	79	—	27	—	—	—

== Olympic Games results ==
Season	Age	Slalom	Giant slalom	Super-G	Downhill	Combined
1988	22	—	DNF2	9	—	—

== World Championships results ==
Season	Age	Slalom	Giant slalom	Super-G	Downhill	Combined
1987	21	—	—	14	—	—
1989	23	—	—	3	—	—

== Sources ==
- Profile at fis-ski.com
