= Bernhard Gstrein =

Austrian alpine skier (born 1965)

Personal information
- Born: 19 September 1965 (age 60) Sölden, Tyrol, Austria

Skiing career
- Country: Austria
- Sport: Alpine skiing
- Disciplines: Slalom
Medal record
Men's alpine skiing
| Silver medal – second place | 1988 Calgary | Alpine combined |

Bernhard Gstrein (born 19 September 1965) is a former alpine skier from Austria. Born in Vent, he competed from 1984 to 1996 and won one World Cup slalom competition.

== Career ==
At the 1988 Winter Olympics, he won a silver medal in the men's alpine combined. He is a relative of current Austrian ski racer Fabio Gstrein.
