= Rudolf Nierlich =

Austrian alpine skier (1966–1991)

Personal information
- Born: 20 February 1966 Bad Ischl, Austria
- Died: 18 May 1991 (aged 25) St. Wolfgang im Salzkammergut, Austria

Skiing career
- Sport: Alpine skiing
- Retired: 1991
- World Cup debut: 1985

Olympics
- Teams: 1
- Medals: 0 (0 gold)

World Championships
- Teams: 3
- Medals: 3 (3 gold)

World Cup
- Seasons: 6
- Wins: 8
- Podiums: 23
Medal record
Men's Alpine skiing
Representing Austria
World Cup race podiums
Event	1st	2nd	3rd
Slalom	5	3	3
Giant slalom	3	4	5
Total	8	7	8
International competitions
Event	1st	2nd	3rd
Olympic Games	0	0	0
World Championships	3	0	0
Junior World Championships	1	0	0
Total	4	0	0
World Championships
Gold medal – first place	1989 Vail	Giant slalom
Gold medal – first place	1989 Vail	Slalom
Gold medal – first place	1991 Saalbach	Giant slalom

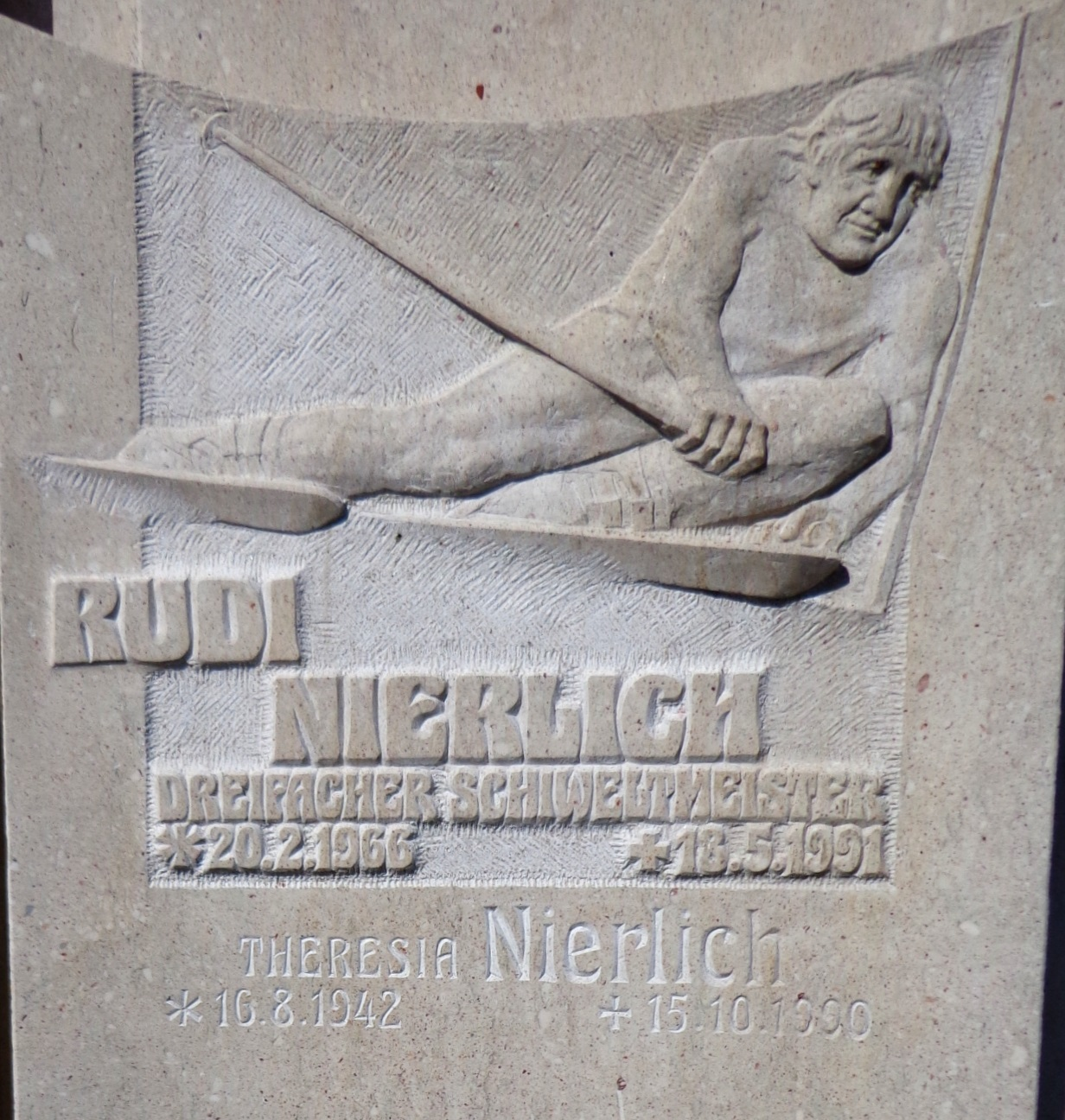
Rudi Nierlich's grave at St. Wolfgang im Salzkammergut.

Rudolf "Rudi" Nierlich (20 February 1966 – 18 May 1991) was an Austrian alpine skier. Born in Sankt Wolfgang im Salzkammergut (Upper Austria), he won a total of eight races in the Alpine Skiing World Cup, and was three times World Champion (1989 and 1991), in Slalom and giant slalom.

== Death ==
Nierlich died in May 1991 in a traffic collision in Sankt Wolfgang im Salzkammergut.

== World Cup victories ==
Date	Location	Race
30 January 1988	(Austria) Schladming	Giant slalom
10 January 1989	(Austria) Kirchberg	Giant slalom
22 January 1989	(Switzerland) Wengen	Slalom
3 March 1989	(Japan) Furano	Giant slalom
10 March 1989	(Japan) Shigakogen	Slalom
21 January 1990	(Austria) Kitzbühel	Slalom
26 February 1991	(Norway) Oppdal	Slalom
10 March 1991	(United States) Aspen	Slalom

== World Championship results ==
Year
Year	Age	Slalom	Giant; Slalom	Super-G	Downhill	Combined
1987	21	—	—	—	7	—
1989	23	1	1	—	—	—
1991	25	—	1	—	—	—

== Europa Cup results ==
Nierlich won an overall Europa Cup and one specialty standing.

- FIS Alpine Ski Europa Cup
  - Overall: 1986
  - Giant slalom: 1986
