= Lars-Börje Eriksson =

Swedish alpine skier (born 1966)

Olympic medal record

Men's alpine skiing

Representing Sweden

Olympic Games
Bronze medal – third place	1988 Calgary	Super-G

Lars-Börje "Bulan" Eriksson (born 21 October 1966) is a Swedish former alpine skier. He surprisingly won a bronze medal in the super-G competition at the 1988 Winter Olympics in Calgary. Later he also won two World Cup victories, one in super-G and one in giant slalom. He finished his skiing career in 1992, after having struggled with an injury from a bone fracture during downhill training in the 1991 World Championships.

== World Cup victories ==
Date	Location	Discipline
18 February 1989	(United States) Aspen	Super-G
11 August 1989	(Australia) Thredbo	Giant slalom
