= Hubert Strolz =

Austrian alpine skier

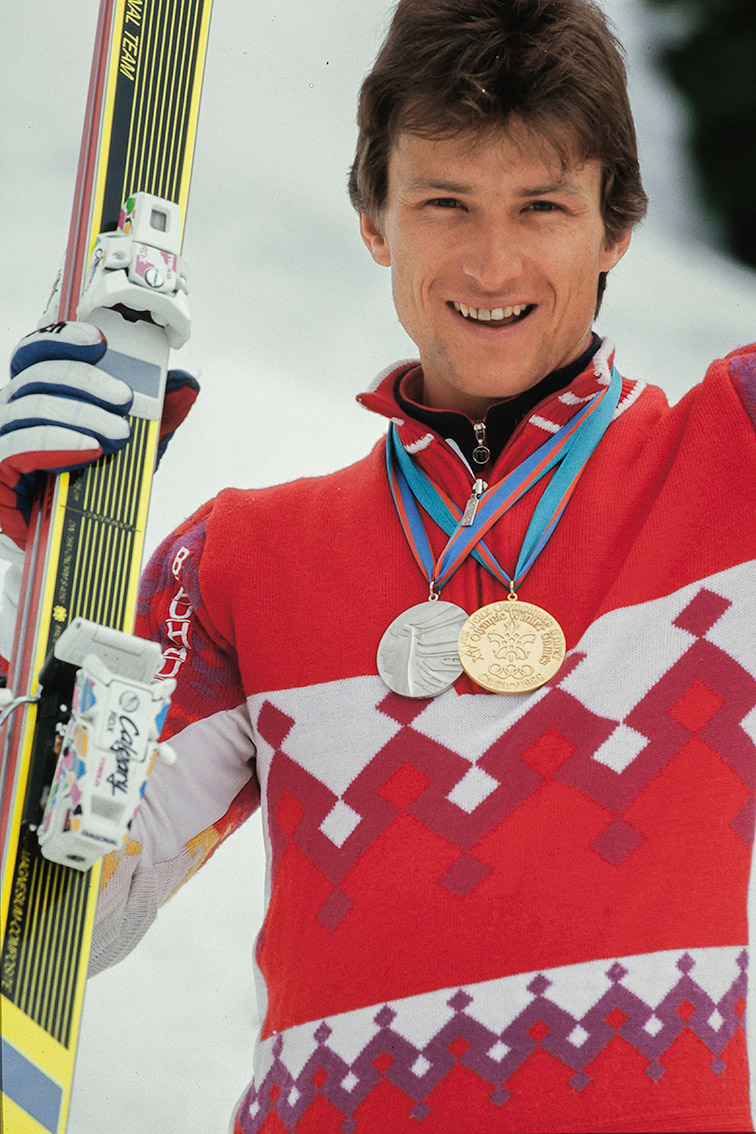

Personal information
- Born: 26 June 1962 (age 64) Warth, Vorarlberg, Austria
- Height: 1.82 m (6 ft 0 in)
- Weight: 76 kg (168 lb)
- Children: Johannes Strolz

Sport
- Sport: Alpine skiing
- Club: Warth
Medal record
Representing Austria
Olympic Games
Gold medal – first place	1988 Calgary	Combined
Silver medal – second place	1988 Calgary	Giant Slalom

Hubert Strolz (born 26 June 1962), nickname "Hubsi", is a former alpine skier from Austria. At the 1988 Olympics in Calgary he won a gold medal in the combined and silver in the Giant Slalom.

== Career ==
In the World Cup, he won a combined competition 17 January 1988, in Bad Kleinkirchheim. This event was a part of the Hahnenkamm-races which were transferred to "BKK" (short name) because there was not enough snow in Kitzbühel. Hubert was a sober racer and an eternal runner-up by finishing 2nd for 14 times (and in 18 times he finished as the third, always in regard to the Alpine World Cup). He was on the way to win another gold medal in the combined at the 1992 Olympics in Albertville but he fell down in the second leg of the slalom just a short distance before the finish line. Like in that case (he saw it as compensation for having luck by winning the gold medal in Calgary, when the great favourite Pirmin Zurbriggen did nlt finish the slalom in this way too), he always did not interpret losses as an unluck though it seemed so for the public. He did hold the view that his opponents did it better than he (quite often he was – unexpected – intercepted as a race-leader, and in the FIS Alpine Skiing World Championships 1989, he was third in the Super-G but at last Tomaž Čižman (22nd starter) could obtain the bronze medal. He now runs a skiing and snowboard school in his hometown Warth.

== World Cup victories ==
=== Overall victories ===
Season	Discipline
1988 Alpine Skiing World Cup	Combined

=== Individual victories ===
Date	Location	Race
17 January 1988	(Austria) Bad Kleinkirchheim	Combined

== See also ==
- List of Olympic medalist families
