= Marc Girardelli =

Austrian-Luxembourgish alpine ski racer

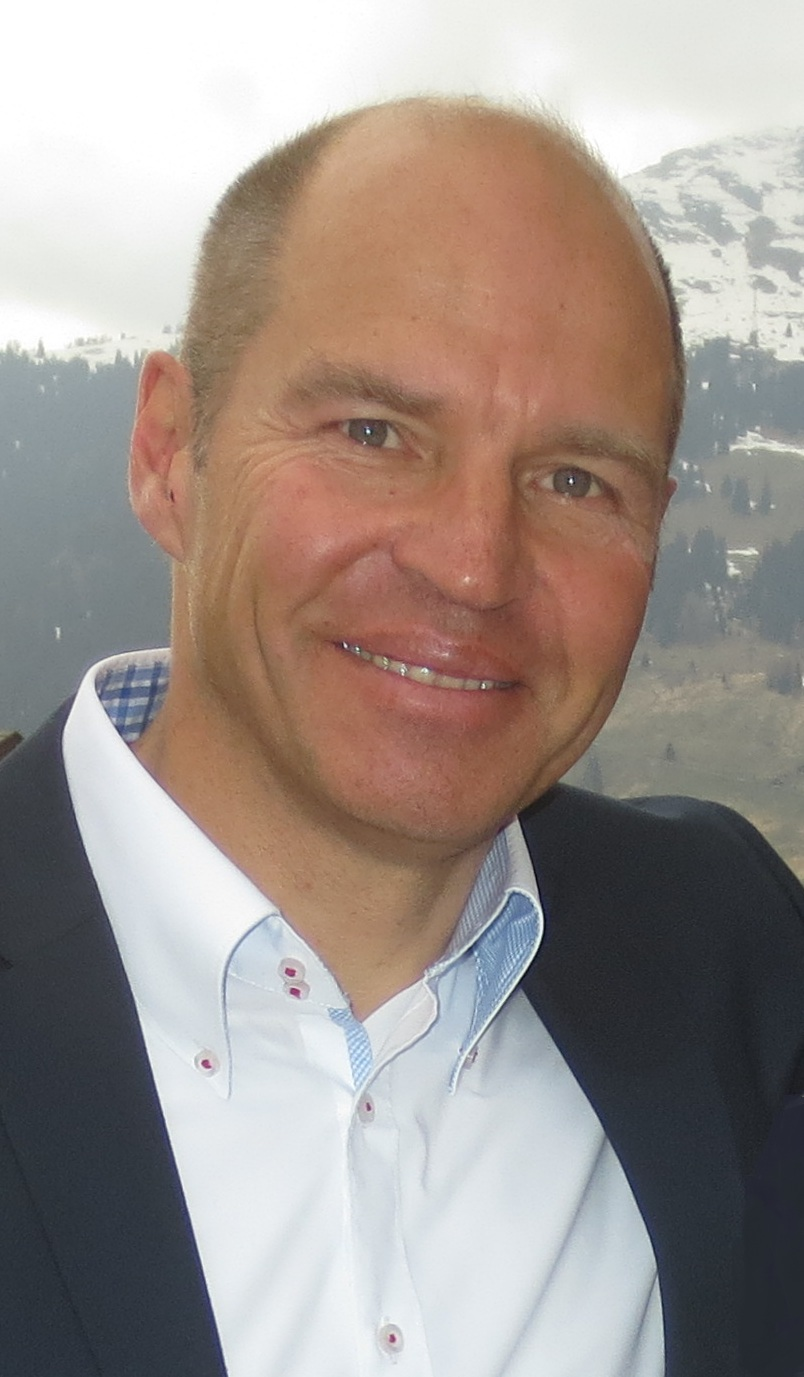
- Marc Girardelli in April 2014

Personal information
- Born: 18 July 1963 (age 63) Lustenau, Austria

Skiing career
- Sport: Alpine skiing

World Cup
- Overall titles: 5
- Discipline titles: 10
Medal record
International alpine ski competitions
Representing Luxembourg
Event	1st	2nd	3rd
Olympic Games	0	2	0
World Championships	4	4	3
Total	4	6	3
World Cup race podiums
Event	1st	2nd	3rd
Slalom	16	4	5
Giant	7	10	9
Super-G	9	4	5
Downhill	3	8	6
Combined	11	2	1
Parallel	0	0	0
Total	46	28	26
Olympic Games
Silver medal – second place	1992 Albertville	Super-G
Silver medal – second place	1992 Albertville	Giant slalom
World Championships
Gold medal – first place	1987 Crans-Montana	Combined
Gold medal – first place	1989 Vail	Combined
Gold medal – first place	1991 Saalbach	Slalom
Gold medal – first place	1996 Sierra Nevada	Combined
Silver medal – second place	1985 Bormio	Slalom
Silver medal – second place	1987 Crans-Montana	Giant slalom
Silver medal – second place	1987 Crans-Montana	Super-G
Silver medal – second place	1993 Morioka	Slalom
Bronze medal – third place	1985 Bormio	Giant slalom
Bronze medal – third place	1989 Vail	Slalom
Bronze medal – third place	1993 Morioka	Combined

Marc Girardelli (born 18 July 1963) is an Austrian–Luxembourgish former alpine ski racer, a five-time World Cup overall champion who excelled in all five alpine disciplines.

== Biography ==
Born in Lustenau, Austria into a family originally from Valsugana, Italy, Girardelli started skiing at the age of five and was racing at seven. He enjoyed significant success at junior level, winning local competitions in not only alpine skiing but also ski jumping. He competed for Austria until 1976, then switched to Luxembourg due to disagreements about coaching – the Austrian skiing federation wanted Girardelli to attend a ski boarding school in Schruns, thirty miles (50 km) from Lustenau, while his parents preferred for him to stay in his hometown. In 1981, he started to make significant progress with his first podium (top-three finish) in Wengen, Switzerland, and from that moment was in contention for slalom and giant slalom podiums on a regular basis.

He achieved his first World Cup victory in Sweden in February 1983, but incurred his first major injury two weeks later, tearing all the ligaments, cartilage, and a tendon in his left knee in a crash during a downhill at Lake Louise. In the following season, he won five slalom races and was third in the overall standings.

In 1985, Girardelli won 11 races and the World Cup overall title, followed by another overall title in 1986 and a third in 1989. After another major accident in 1990, in which he narrowly avoided paraplegia, he recovered to win the overall again in 1991 and in 1993 for a record fifth time – a record until Marcel Hirscher won a sixth title in 2017 (Annemarie Moser-Pröll won six women's World Cups). In total, Girardelli won 46 World Cup races (fifth-most of all time among men) and recorded 100 podiums.

Because Girardelli retained Austrian citizenship while skiing for Luxembourg, he was ineligible to compete in the 1980 or 1984 Winter Olympics - but also to compete in the 1982 World Championships. (In contrast, regulations did allow to start for Luxembourg in the World Cup). For a while, his appearance at the 1985 World Championships was in doubt, but he was able to show evidence that he was in the process of claiming Luxembourg citizenship. The FIS gave special permission, and he won a silver medal in the slalom and bronze in the giant slalom. Girardelli received Luxembourg citizenship in time to compete in the 1987 World Championships. His first Olympics were in 1988 at Calgary, but he did not win a medal. In 1992 at Albertville, he won silver medals in super-G and giant slalom – the first medals for the Grand Duchy at the Winter Olympics, and Luxembourg's first Olympic medal since Josy Barthel's gold in the 1500 metres in 1952.

Girardelli won eleven World Championship medals, including four golds: (slalom at Saalbach in 1991 and combined at Crans-Montana in 1987, Vail in 1989, and Sierra Nevada in 1996).

His final World Cup race was in the downhill race at Val Gardena on 20 December 1996; he had announced his intention to start the next day in another downhill, but suffered a new knee injury. After failing to start in the following races, he announced his retirement from international competition in January 1997 at age 33.

Girardelli is an honorary citizen of the Bulgarian ski resort Bansko. Since 2015, he has been serving as an advisor to the Minister of Tourism of Bulgaria, Nikolina Angelkova, on winter tourism matters. On 17 December 2018 Girardelli disclosed that he holds a majority share in Yulen AD, the controversial operator of the ski zone in Bansko.

He is an organiser of skiing events at several European winter sports resorts, and in Portillo, Chile. Since 2005 he has been an IBO for kids fashion in sports, called Marc Girardelli Skiwear.

== World Cup results ==
=== Season standings ===
Season	Age	Overall	Slalom	Giant slalom	Super-G	Downhill	Combined
1980	16	84	–	32	not run	–	–
1981	17	26	15	23	not run	–	–
1982	18	6	8	3	not run	–	–
1983	19	4	7	6	not awarded	–	3
1984	20	3	1	4	not awarded	–	34
1985	21	1	1	1	not awarded	19	—
1986	22	1	11	5	3	4	2
1987	23	2	28	5	2	10	—
1988	24	5	23	13	4	7	—
1989	25	1	3	5	5	1	1
1990	26	25	15	12	–	–	–
1991	27	1	1	3	10	28	1^
1992	28	3	12	7	2	13	11
1993	29	1	13	3	5	6	1
1994	30	2	29	19	2	1	—
1995	31	4	9	18	10	24	1
1996	32	22	20	23	51	47	2
1997	33	115	58	49	–	–	–

^no season title awarded in combined in 1991, only one race completed

=== Season titles ===
Season	Discipline
1984	Slalom
1985	Overall
1985	Slalom
1985	Giant slalom
1986	Overall
1989	Overall
1989	Downhill
1989	Combined
1991	Overall
1991	Slalom
1993	Overall
1993	Combined
1994	Downhill
1995	Combined

=== Race victories ===
- 46 total – (3 downhill, 9 super G, 7 giant slalom, 16 slalom, 11 combined)
- 100 podiums

Season	Date	Location	Race
1983	27 February 1983	Gällivare, Sweden	Slalom
1984	16 January 1984	Parpan, Switzerland	Slalom
1984	22 January 1984	Kitzbühel, Austria	Slalom
1984	15 February 1984	Borovets, Bulgaria	Slalom
1984	18 March 1984	Åre, Sweden	Slalom
1984	24 March 1984	Oslo, Norway	Slalom
1985	2 December 1984	Sestriere, Italy	Slalom
1985	11 December 1984	Sestriere, Italy	Giant slalom
1985	17 December 1984	Madonna di Campiglio, Italy	Super-G
1985	4 January 1985	Bad Wiessee, West Germany	Slalom
1985	13 January 1985	Kitzbühel, Austria	Slalom
1985	21 January 1985	Wengen, Switzerland	Slalom
1985	27 January 1985	Garmisch-Partenkirchen, West Germany	Super-G
1985	16 February 1985	Kranjska Gora, Yugoslavia^{1}	Slalom
1985	10 March 1985	Aspen, USA	Giant slalom
1985	20 March 1985	Park City, USA	Slalom
1985	23 March 1985	Heavenly Valley, USA	Slalom
1986	15 December 1985	Alta Badia, Italy	Combined
1986	5 February 1986	Crans-Montana, Switzerland	Super-G
1986	7 February 1986	St. Anton, Austria	Combined
1987	1 March 1987	Furano, Japan	Super-G
1987	15 March 1987	Calgary, Canada	Super-G
1987	22 March 1987	Sarajevo, Yugoslavia^{2}	Giant slalom
1989	6 December 1988	Sestriere, Italy	Slalom
1989	17 December 1988	Kranjska Gora, Yugoslavia^{1}	Slalom
1989	13 January 1989	Kitzbühel, Austria	Downhill
1989	15 January 1989	Kitzbühel, Austria	Combined
1989	17 January 1989	Adelboden, Switzerland	Giant slalom
1989	20 January 1989	Wengen, Switzerland	Downhill
1989	21 January 1989	Wengen, Switzerland	Downhill
1989	22 January 1989	Wengen, Switzerland	Combined
1989	26 February 1989	Whistler, Canada	Super-G
1991	13 January 1991	Kitzbühel, Austria	Slalom
1991	13 January 1991	Kitzbühel, Austria	Combined
1991	15 January 1991	Adelboden, Switzerland	Giant slalom
1992	8 December 1991	Val-d'Isère, France	Super-G
1993	13 December 1992	Alta Badia, Italy	Giant slalom
1993	20 December 1992	Kranjska Gora, Slovenia	Giant slalom
1993	10 January 1993	Garmisch-Partenkirchen, Germany	Combined
1993	12 January 1993	St. Anton, Austria	Super-G
1993	17 January 1993	St. Anton, Austria	Combined
1993	24 January 1993	Veysonnaz, Switzerland	Combined
1994	23 January 1994	Wengen, Switzerland	Super-G
1995	15 January 1995	Kitzbühel, Austria	Combined
1995	22 January 1995	Wengen, Switzerland	Combined
1996	21 January 1996	Veysonnaz, Switzerland	Combined

^{1} now Slovenia
^{2} now Bosnia and Herzegovina

== World championship results ==
Year	Age	Slalom	Giant slalom	Super-G	Downhill	Combined
1985	21	2	3	not run	—	—
1987	23	4	2	2	7	1
1989	25	3	4	14	—	1
1991	27	1	5	—	9	DNF
1993	29	2	7	cancelled	—	3
1996	32	DNS1	DNF1	18	18	1

- The Super-G in 1993 was cancelled after multiple weather delays.

== Olympic results ==
Year	Age	Slalom	Giant slalom	Super-G	Downhill	Combined
1988	24	—	20	DNF	9	—
1992	28	DSQ1	2	2	DNF	DNF1
1994	30	DSQ1	DNF1	4	5	9

== See also ==
- Ski World Cup Most podiums & Top 10 results
