= Pirmin Zurbriggen =

Swiss alpine skier

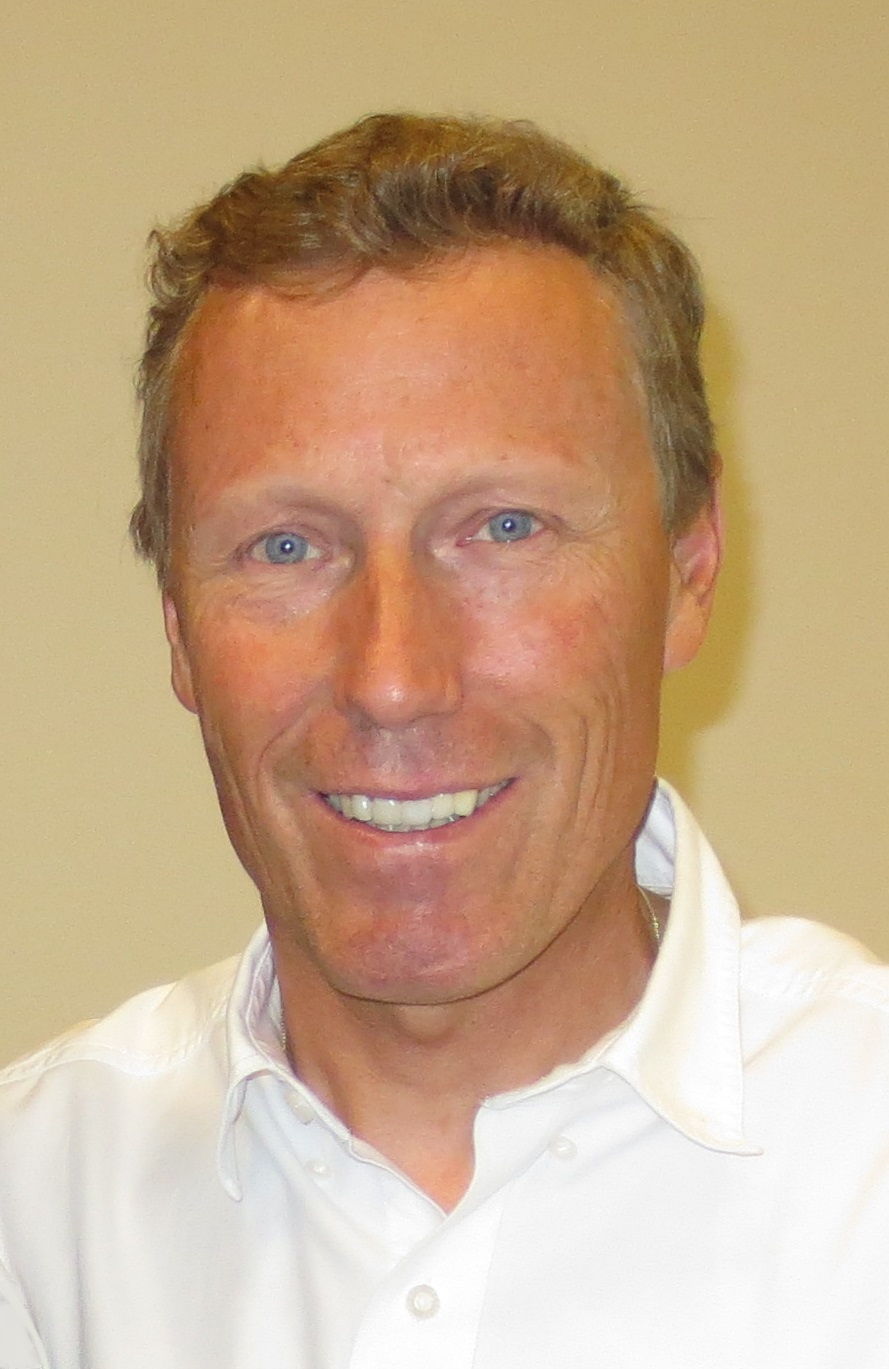
- Zurbriggen in 2014

Personal information
- Born: 4 February 1963 (age 63) Saas Almagell, Valais, Switzerland
- Height: 1.83 m (6 ft 0 in)
- Website: zurbriggen.ch

Skiing career
- Sport: Alpine skiing
- Retired: 17 March 1990 (age 27)
- Disciplines: Downhill, super-G, giant slalom, slalom, combined
- World Cup debut: 4 January 1981 (age 17)

Olympics
- Teams: 2 (1984, 1988)
- Medals: 2 (1 gold)

World Championships
- Teams: 4 (1982, 1985, 1987, 1989)
- Medals: 9 (4 gold)

World Cup
- Seasons: 10 (1981–1990)
- Wins: 40
- Podiums: 83
- Overall titles: 4 (1984, 1987, 1988, 1990)
- Discipline titles: 12
Medal record
Men's Alpine Skiing
Representing Switzerland
International alpine ski competitions
Event	1st	2nd	3rd
Olympic Games	1	0	1
World Championships	4	4	1
Total	5	4	2
World Cup race podiums
Event	1st	2nd	3rd
Slalom	2	2	2
Giant	7	6	6
Super-G	10	9	4
Downhill	10	5	4
Combined	11	4	1
Parallel	0	0	0
Total	40	26	17
Olympic Games
Gold medal – first place	1988 Calgary	Downhill
Bronze medal – third place	1988 Calgary	Giant slalom
World Championships
Gold medal – first place	1985 Bormio	Downhill
Gold medal – first place	1985 Bormio	Combined
Gold medal – first place	1987 Crans-Montana	Super-G
Gold medal – first place	1987 Crans-Montana	Giant slalom
Silver medal – second place	1985 Bormio	Giant slalom
Silver medal – second place	1987 Crans-Montana	Downhill
Silver medal – second place	1987 Crans-Montana	Combined
Silver medal – second place	1989 Vail	Super-G
Bronze medal – third place	1989 Vail	Giant slalom

Pirmin Zurbriggen (born 4 February 1963) is a former World Cup alpine ski racer from Switzerland. One of the most successful ski racers ever, he won the overall World Cup title four times, an Olympic gold medal in 1988 in Downhill, and nine World Championships medals (4 gold, 4 silver, 1 bronze).

== Biography ==
Zurbriggen was born in Saas-Almagell in the canton of Valais, the son of Alois, an innkeeper, and Ida. His father competed as a ski racer in local competitions in the 1940s and 1950s, but quit the sport after his brother was killed in a training accident. Zurbriggen made his World Cup debut in January 1981, a month before his 18th birthday. With his victory in the downhill at Kitzbühel in January 1985 at age 21, he became the first to win World Cup races in all five disciplines. (The fifth discipline, super-G, was added in December 1982.) Incidentally Marc Girardelli, the second to enter this exclusive circle, won his first downhill race four years later at the same venue.

Zurbriggen retired from international competition after having won the 1990 World Cup overall title – his fourth, which was then the most overall titles won by a single racer, reached only once before by Gustav Thöni in 1975. Again it was Marc Girardelli who followed him in 1991 with a fourth overall title, and Girardelli added another in 1993 to become the first male racer with five overall titles in World Cup history.

Zurbriggen grew up in the remote village of Saas-Almagell, near Saas-Fee. With a total of 40 World Cup victories over nine years and five gold medals, he belongs to the "All-Time Greats" of alpine skiing, ranking fifth in all-time wins and having 169 Top Ten finishes.

Zurbriggen left the World Cup tour as a hero to start a family; he was married the previous summer (30 June 1989) to Monika Julen (the sister of his best friend on the Swiss ski team, Max Julen), with whom he has five children: Elia, Pirmin Jr., Maria, Alain and Leonie, who have all competed in ski racing. He is the older brother of Heidi Zurbriggen, a winner of three World Cup downhill races, and a distant cousin of Silvan Zurbriggen.

Zurbriggen now runs the Wellness Hotel Pirmin Zurbriggen with his parents in Saas-Almagell and another hotel, Apparthotel Zurbriggen, in Zermatt. In addition, after his World Cup career had ended he partnered with Authier Ski company on a line of signature skis.

== World Cup results ==
=== Season standings ===
Season	Age	Overall	Slalom	Giant slalom	Super G	Downhill	Combined
1981	18	31	—	17	not run	—	18
1982	19	11	33	6	not run	—	7
1983	20	6	21	4	not awarded (w/ GS)	26	3
1984	21	1	24	2	not awarded (w/ GS)	10	2
1985	22	2	14	2	not awarded (w/ GS)	5	9
1986	23	2	6	10	2	11	1
1987	24	1	21	1	1	1	1
1988	25	1	9	4	1	1	4
1989	26	2	15	2	1	4	3
1990	27	1	11	6	1	3	1

=== Season titles ===
- 11 titles (4 overall, 2 DH, 4 SG, 1 GS) plus unofficial 3 K

Season	Discipline
1984	Overall
1987	Overall
1987	Downhill
1987	Super-G
1987	Giant slalom
1988	Overall
1988	Downhill
1988	Super G
1989	Super-G
1990	Overall
1990	Super-G

=== Race victories ===
- 40 wins (10 DH, 10 SG, 7 GS, 11 SC, 2 SL)
- 83 podiums (40 wins, 26 second place, 17 third place)

==== Downhill ====
Date	Location
11-Jan-1985	(Austria) Kitzbühel
12-Jan-1985	(Austria) Kitzbühel
16-Aug-1986	(Argentina) Las Leñas
05-Dec-1986	(France) Val d'Isère
10-Jan-1987	(West Germany) Garmisch
25-Jan-1987	(Austria) Kitzbühel
07-Mar-1987	(United States) Aspen, CO
09-Jan-1988	(France) Val d'Isère
29-Jan-1988	(Austria) Schladming
06-Dec-1989	(Italy) Val Gardena

==== Giant slalom ====
Date	Location
24-Mar-1982	(Italy) San Sicario
11-Jan-1983	(Switzerland) Adelboden
05-Mar-1984	(United States) Aspen, CO
13-Jan-1987	(Switzerland) Adelboden
20-Jan-1987	(Switzerland) Adelboden
15-Feb-1987	(West Germany) Todtnau
29-Nov-1988	(France) Val Thorens

==== Slalom ====
Date	Location
10-Dec-1984	(Italy) Sestriere
23-Feb-1986	(Sweden) Åre

==== Super-G ====
Date	Location
19-Dec-1983	(Italy) Val Gardena
20-Mar-1984	(Norway) Oppdal
07-Dec-1984	(France) Puy-Saint-Vincent
17-Mar-1985	(Canada) Panorama, BC
28-Feb-1986	(Norway) Hemsedal
08-Mar-1987	(United States) Aspen, CO
27-Nov-1988	(Austria) Schladming
12-Dec-1989	(Italy) Sestriere
06-Feb-1990	(Italy) Courmayeur
10-Mar-1990	(Norway) Hemsedal

==== Combined ====
Date	Location
24-Jan-1982	(Switzerland) Wengen
22-Dec-1982	(Italy) Campiglio
29-Jan-1984	(West Germany) Garmisch
11-Jan-1985	(Austria) Kitzbühel
19-Jan-1986	(Austria) Kitzbühel
23-Feb-1986	(Sweden) Åre
18-Jan-1987	(Switzerland) Wengen
25-Jan-1987	(Austria) Kitzbühel
22-Dec-1988	(Austria) St. Anton
12-Jan-1990	(Austria) Schladming
21-Jan-1990	(Austria) Kitzbühel

== World championship results ==
Year	Age	Slalom	Giant slalom	Super-G	Downhill	Combined
1985	22	DNF	2	not run	1	1
1987	24	DNF	1	1	2	2
1989	26	DNF	3	2	15	4

== Olympic results ==
Year	Age	Slalom	Giant slalom	Super-G	Downhill	Combined
1984	21	DNF1	DNF1	not run	4	not run
1988	25	7	3	5	1	DNF SL2

== See also ==
- Ski World Cup Most podiums & Top 10 results

Awards
Preceded by Étienne Dagon	Swiss Sportsman of the Year; 1985	Succeeded by Werner Günthör
