= 1991 Alpine Skiing World Cup – Men's super-G =

1991 Men's Super G World Cup
Previous: 1990	Next: 1992

Men's Super-G World Cup 1990/1991

== Calendar ==
Round	Race No	Place	Country	Date	Winner	Second	Third
1	3	Valloire	France	December 2, 1990	(France) Franck Piccard	(Switzerland) Franz Heinzer	(Austria) Stephan Eberharter
2	13	Garmisch-Partenkirchen	Germany	January 6, 1991	(Austria) Günther Mader	(Switzerland) Franz Heinzer	(Luxembourg) Marc Girardelli
3	26	Lake Louise	Canada	March 17, 1991	(Germany) Markus Wasmeier	(Italy) Patrick Holzer	(Austria) Stephan Eberharter

== Final point standings ==
In Men's Super-G World Cup 1990/91 all three results count.

Place	Name	Country	Total points	3 (France)	13 (Germany)	26 (Canada)
1	Franz Heinzer	Switzerland	40	20	20	-
2	Stephan Eberharter	Austria	33	15	3	15
3	Atle Skårdal	Norway	28	12	7	9
4	Franck Piccard	France	27	25	-	2
5	Günther Mader	Austria	26	1	25	-
6	Markus Wasmeier	Germany	25	-	-	25
7	Patrick Holzer	Italy	20	-	-	20
8	Kjetil André Aamodt	Norway	19	8	11	-
9	Hannes Zehentner	Germany	18	10	4	4
10	Marc Girardelli	Luxembourg	15	-	15	-
	Luc Alphand	France	15	-	9	6
12	Paul Accola	Switzerland	13	5	-	8
13	Lasse Arnesen	Norway	12	-	12	-
	Rainer Salzgeber	Austria	12	-	-	12
	Daniel Mahrer	Switzerland	12	-	-	12
	Didrik Marksten	Norway	12	-	2	10
	Josef Polig	Italy	12	1	8	3
18	Jean-Luc Crétier	France	11	11	-	-
19	Ole Kristian Furuseth	Norway	10	10	-	-
	Kristian Ghedina	Italy	10	-	10	-
21	Steve Locher	Switzerland	7	7	-	-
	Niklas Henning	Sweden	7	-	-	7
23	Lars-Börje Eriksson	Sweden	6	6	-	-
	Urs Kälin	Switzerland	6	-	6	-
	Lasse Kjus	Norway	6	-	6	-
26	Patrick Ortlieb	Austria	5	-	-	5
27	Asgeir Linberg	Norway	4	4	-	-
	Hubert Strolz	Austria	4	3	1	-
29	Peter Runggaldier	Italy	3	2	1	-
30	Karl Alpiger	Switzerland	1	-	-	1

== Men's Super-G Team Results ==
bold indicate highest score - italics indicate race wins

Place	Country	Total points	3 (France)	13 (Germany)	26 (Canada)	Racers	Wins
1	Norway	91	34	**38**	19	7	0
2	Austria	80	19	29	32	5	1
3	Switzerland	79	32	26	21	6	0
4	France	53	36	9	8	3	1
5	Italy	45	3	19	23	4	0
6	Germany	43	10	4	29	2	1
7	Luxembourg	15	-	15	-	1	0
8	Sweden	13	6	-	7	2	0

**Alpine skiing World Cup**
**Men**

Overall | Downhill | Super-G | Giant Slalom | Slalom | Combined

**1991**
