= 1990 Alpine Skiing World Cup – Men's super-G =

International sporting competition

1990 Men's super-G World Cup
Previous: 1989	Next: 1991

Below are the results of the Men's super-G World Cup 1989/1990 competition.

== Calendar ==
Round	Race No	Place	Country	Date	Winner	Second	Third
1	8	Val d'Isère	France	December 10, 1989	(Sweden) Niklas Henning	(France) Franck Piccard	(Italy) Peter Runggaldier
2	9	Sestriere	Italy	December 12, 1989	(Switzerland) Pirmin Zurbriggen	(Sweden) Lars-Börje Eriksson	(France) Franck Piccard
3	23	Val d'Isère	France	January 29, 1990	(Switzerland) Steve Locher	(France) Armand Schiele	(Austria) Günther Mader
4	24	Les Menuires	France	January 30, 1990	(Austria) Günther Mader	(Norway) Ole Kristian Furuseth	(Norway) Atle Skårdal
5	27	Courmayeur	Italy	February 6, 1990	(Switzerland) Pirmin Zurbriggen	(Austria) Günther Mader	(Italy) Peter Runggaldier
6	31	Hemsedal	Norway	March 10, 1990	(Switzerland) Pirmin Zurbriggen	(Switzerland) Karl Alpiger	(West Germany) Hans Stuffer

== Final point standings ==
In men's super-G World Cup 1989/90 all results count.

Place	Name	Country	Total points	8 (France)	9 (Italy)	23 (France)	24 (France)	27 (Italy)	31 (Norway)
1	Pirmin Zurbriggen	Switzerland	98	8	25	6	9	25	25
2	Günther Mader	Austria	71	-	1	15	25	20	10
3	Lars-Börje Eriksson	Sweden	61	12	20	10	12	2	5
4	Franck Piccard	France	52	20	15	7	10	-	-
5	Atle Skårdal	Norway	47	-	12	11	15	-	9
6	Ole Kristian Furuseth	Norway	43	11	-	12	20	-	-
7	Niklas Henning	Sweden	39	25	11	-	-	3	-
8	Peter Runggaldier	Italy	37	15	-	-	-	15	7
9	Armand Schiele	France	35	4	-	20	11	-	-
	Markus Wasmeier	West Germany	35	10	-	8	7	10	-
11	Hubert Strolz	Austria	33	2	4	1	8	12	6
12	Hans Stuffer	West Germany	30	-	-	5	-	10	15
13	Konrad Ladstätter	Italy	28	6	9	2	-	11	-
14	Stephan Eberharter	Austria	26	-	-	9	5	4	8
15	Steve Locher	Switzerland	25	-	-	25	-	-	-
16	Danilo Sbardellotto	Italy	24	-	-	4	-	8	12
17	Karl Alpiger	Switzerland	23	-	-	-	3	-	20
18	Jean-Luc Crétier	France	17	5	6	-	6	-	-
19	Kjetil André Aamodt	Norway	13	-	-	-	2	-	11
20	Paul Accola	Switzerland	11	-	2	3	-	6	-
21	Luc Alphand	France	10	-	10	-	-	-	-
	Hans-Jörg Tauscher	West Germany	10	7	3	-	-	-	-
	Franz Heinzer	Switzerland	10	9	-	-	-	1	-
24	Josef Polig	Italy	9	-	8	-	1	-	-
	Daniel Mahrer	Switzerland	9	-	-	-	-	5	4
26	Helmut Höflehner	Austria	8	-	7	-	1	-	-
27	Bernhard Fahner	Switzerland	7	-	-	-	-	7	-
28	Jan Einar Thorsen	Norway	5	-	5	-	-	-	-
29	Hannes Zehentner	West Germany	4	-	-	-	4	-	-
	Lasse Kjus	Norway	4	-	-	-	-	-	4
31	Urs Kälin	Switzerland	3	3	-	-	-	-	-
32	Fredrik Nyberg	Sweden	2	-	-	-	-	-	2
33	Leonhard Stock	Austria	1	1	-	-	-	-	-
	Peter Müller	Switzerland	1	1	-	-	-	-	-
	Peter Rzehak	Austria	1	-	-	-	-	-	1

== Men's super-G team results ==
bold indicate highest score - italics indicate race wins

Place	Country	Total points	8 (France)	9 (Italy)	23 (France)	24 (France)	27 (Italy)	31 (Norway)	Racers	Wins
1	Switzerland	187	21	27	34	12	44	**49**	9	4
2	Austria	140	3	12	25	39	36	25	6	1
3	France	114	29	31	27	27	-	-	4	0
4	Norway	112	11	17	23	37	-	24	5	0
5	Sweden	102	37	31	10	12	5	7	3	1
6	Italy	98	21	17	6	1	34	19	4	0
7	West Germany	79	17	3	13	11	20	15	4	0

**Alpine skiing World Cup**
**Men**

Overall | Downhill | Super-G | Giant slalom | Slalom | Combined

**1990**
