= List of FIS Alpine Ski World Cup winners of men's discipline titles =

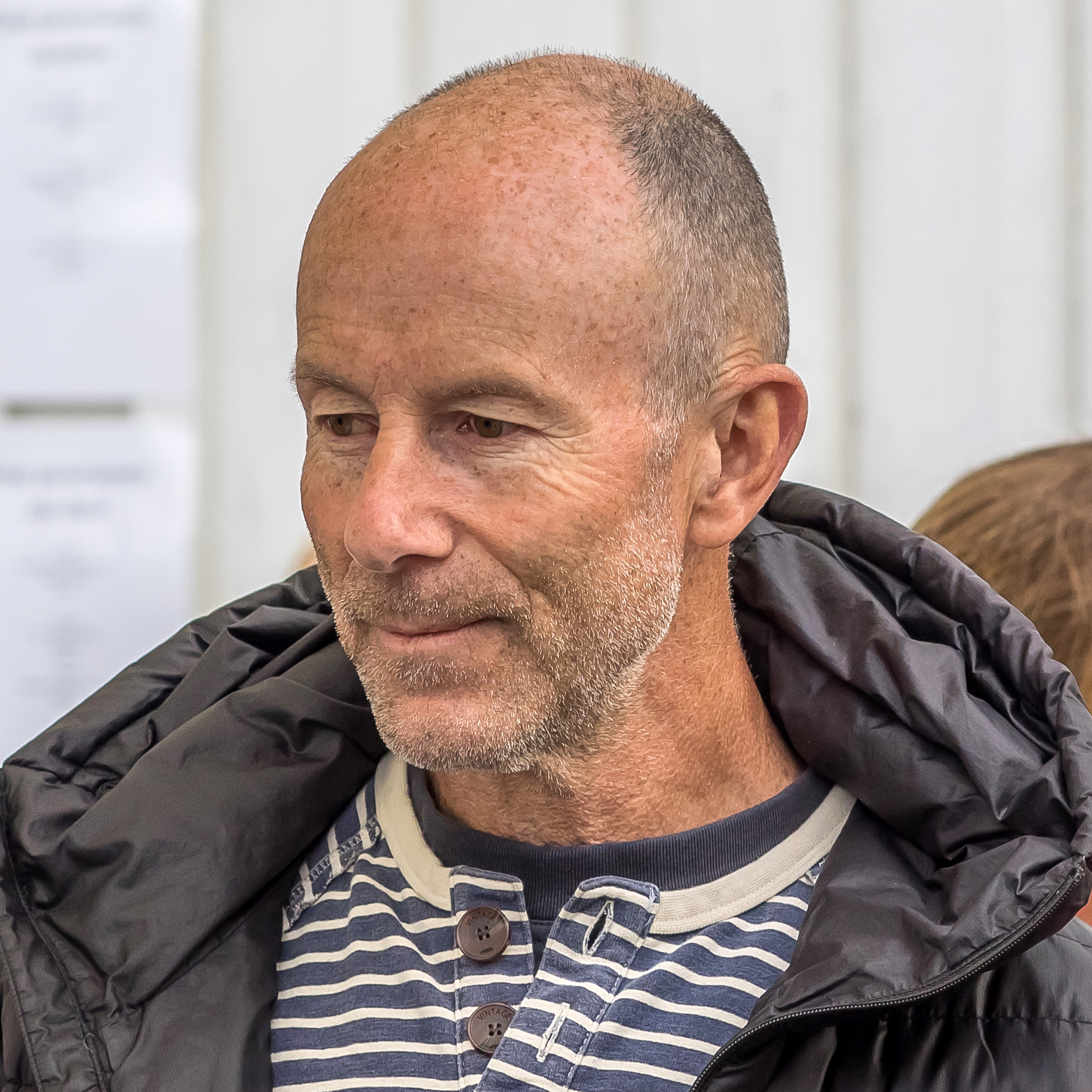
Ingemar Stenmark winner of 15 discipline titles

This is a complete list of FIS Alpine Ski World Cup winners of men's discipline titles, the list is completed by the second and third classified.

== Podiums standings ==
#	Skier	Period	1st	2nd	3rd
1	(Sweden) Ingemar Stenmark	1975–1987	15	7	1
2	(Austria) Marcel Hirscher	2012–2019	12	3	1
3	(Luxembourg) Marc Girardelli	1982–1996	10	5	6
4	(Switzerland) Pirmin Zurbriggen	1983–1990	10	5	3
4	(Austria) Hermann Maier	1998–2006	10	5	3
6	(Norway) Aksel Lund Svindal	2006–2019	9	3	3
7	(Italy) Alberto Tomba	1988–1996	8	5	0
8	(Austria) Benjamin Raich	2001–2010	8	4	5
9	(Norway) Kjetil André Aamodt	1993–2003	8	4	2
10	(United States) Phil Mahre	1978–1983	7	2	3

== Season-end podiums ==
won all races in a single discipline in that season

=== Slalom ===
In the following table men's slalom World Cup season-end podiums since first season in 1967.

Season	1st	2nd	3rd
1967	(France) Jean-Claude Killy	(France) Guy Perillat	(Austria) Heinrich Messner
1968	(Switzerland) Dumeng Giovanoli	(France) Jean-Claude Killy	(France) Patrick Russel
1969	(France) Alain Penz (Austria) Alfred Matt (France) Jean-Noel Augert (France) Patrick Russel		
1970	(France) Patrick Russel (2) (France) Alain Penz (2)		(France) Jean-Noel Augert
1971	(France) Jean-Noel Augert (2)	(Italy) Gustav Thöni	(United States) Tyler Palmer
1972	(France) Jean-Noel Augert (3)	(Poland) Andrzej Bachleda	(Italy) Roland Thöni
1973	(Italy) Gustav Thöni	(Germany) Christian Neureuther	(France) Jean-Noel Augert
1974	(Italy) Gustav Thöni (2)	(Germany) Christian Neureuther	(Austria) Johann Kniewasser
1975	(Sweden) Ingemar Stenmark	(Italy) Gustav Thöni	(Italy) Piero Gros
1976	(Sweden) Ingemar Stenmark (2)	(Italy) Piero Gros	(Italy) Gustav Thöni (Austria) Hans Hinterseer
1977	(Sweden) Ingemar Stenmark (3)	(Austria) Klaus Heidegger	(Liechtenstein) Paul Frommelt
1978	(Sweden) Ingemar Stenmark (4)	(Austria) Klaus Heidegger	(United States) Phil Mahre
1979	(Sweden) Ingemar Stenmark (5)	(United States) Phil Mahre	(Germany) Christian Neureuther
1980	(Sweden) Ingemar Stenmark (6)	(Socialist Federal Republic of Yugoslavia) Bojan Križaj	(Germany) Christian Neureuther
1981	(Sweden) Ingemar Stenmark (7)	(United States) Phil Mahre	(Socialist Federal Republic of Yugoslavia) Bojan Križaj (United States) Steve Mahre
1982	(United States) Phil Mahre	(Sweden) Ingemar Stenmark	(United States) Steve Mahre
1983	(Sweden) Ingemar Stenmark (8)^{[B]}	(Sweden) Stig Strand	(Liechtenstein) Andreas Wenzel
1984	(Luxembourg) Marc Girardelli	(Sweden) Ingemar Stenmark	(Austria) Franz Gruber
1985	(Luxembourg) Marc Girardelli (2)	(Liechtenstein) Paul Frommelt	(Sweden) Ingemar Stenmark
1986	(Socialist Federal Republic of Yugoslavia) Rok Petrovič	(Socialist Federal Republic of Yugoslavia) Bojan Križaj (Sweden) Ingemar Stenmark (Liechtenstein) Paul Frommelt	
1987	(Socialist Federal Republic of Yugoslavia) Bojan Križaj	(Sweden) Ingemar Stenmark	(Germany) Armin Bittner
1988	(Italy) Alberto Tomba	(Austria) Günther Mader	(United States) Felix McGrath
1989	(Germany) Armin Bittner	(Italy) Alberto Tomba	(Luxembourg) Marc Girardelli (Norway) Ole-Christian Furuseth
1990	(Germany) Armin Bittner (2)	(Italy) Alberto Tomba (Norway) Ole-Christian Furuseth	
1991	(Luxembourg) Marc Girardelli (3)	(Norway) Ole-Christian Furuseth	(Austria) Rudolf Nierlich
1992	(Italy) Alberto Tomba (2)	(Switzerland) Paul Accola	(Norway) Finn-Christian Jagge
1993	(Sweden) Thomas Fogdö	(Italy) Alberto Tomba	(Austria) Thomas Stangassinger
1994	(Italy) Alberto Tomba (3)	(Austria) Thomas Stangassinger	(Slovenia) Jure Košir
1995	(Italy) Alberto Tomba (4)	(Austria) Michael Tritscher	(Slovenia) Jure Košir
1996	(France) Sebastien Amiez	(Italy) Alberto Tomba	(Austria) Thomas Sykora
1997	(Austria) Thomas Sykora	(Austria) Thomas Stangassinger	(Norway) Finn-Christian Jagge
1998	(Austria) Thomas Sykora (2)	(Austria) Thomas Stangassinger	(Norway) Hans-Petter Buraas
1999	(Austria) Thomas Stangassinger	(Slovenia) Jure Košir	(Norway) Finn-Christian Jagge
2000	(Norway) Kjetil-Andre Aamodt	(Norway) Ole-Christian Furuseth	(Slovenia) Matjaž Vrhovnik
2001	(Austria) Benjamin Raich	(Austria) Heinz Schilchegger	(Austria) Mario Matt
2002	(Croatia) Ivica Kostelić	(United States) Bode Miller	(France) Jean-Pierre Vidal
2003	(Finland) Kalle Palander	(Croatia) Ivica Kostelić	(Austria) Rainer Schönfelder
2004	(Austria) Rainer Schönfelder	(Finland) Kalle Palander	(Austria) Benjamin Raich
2005	(Austria) Benjamin Raich (2)	(Austria) Rainer Schönfelder	(Austria) Manfred Pranger
2006	(Italy) Giorgio Rocca	(Finland) Kalle Palander	(Austria) Benjamin Raich
2007	(Austria) Benjamin Raich (3)	(Austria) Mario Matt	(Sweden) Jens Byggmark
2008	(Italy) Manfred Mölgg	(France) Jean-Baptiste Grange	(Austria) Reinfried Herbst
2009	(France) Jean-Baptiste Grange	(Croatia) Ivica Kostelić	(France) Julien Lizeroux
2010	(Austria) Reinfried Herbst	(France) Julien Lizeroux	(Switzerland) Silvan Zurbriggen
2011	(Croatia) Ivica Kostelić	(France) Jean-Baptiste Grange	(Sweden) Andre Myhrer
2012	(Sweden) Andre Myhrer	(Croatia) Ivica Kostelić	(Austria) Marcel Hirscher
2013	(Austria) Marcel Hirscher	(Germany) Felix Neureuther	(Croatia) Ivica Kostelić
2014	(Austria) Marcel Hirscher (2)	(Germany) Felix Neureuther	(Norway) Henrik Kristoffersen
2015	(Austria) Marcel Hirscher (3)	(Germany) Felix Neureuther	(Russia) Alexander Khoroshilov
2016	(Norway) Henrik Kristoffersen	(Austria) Marcel Hirscher	(Germany) Felix Neureuther
2017	(Austria) Marcel Hirscher (4)	(Norway) Henrik Kristoffersen	(Italy) Manfred Mölgg
2018	(Austria) Marcel Hirscher (5)	(Norway) Henrik Kristoffersen	(Sweden) Andre Myhrer
2019	(Austria) Marcel Hirscher (6)	(France) Clément Noël	(Switzerland) Daniel Yule
2020	(Norway) Henrik Kristoffersen (2)	(France) Clément Noël	(Switzerland) Daniel Yule
2021	(Austria) Marco Schwarz	(France) Clément Noël	(Switzerland) Ramon Zenhäusern
2022	(Norway) Henrik Kristoffersen (3)	(Austria) Manuel Feller	(Norway) Atle Lie McGrath
2023	(Norway) Lucas Braathen	(Norway) Henrik Kristoffersen	(Switzerland) Ramon Zenhäusern
2024	(Austria) Manuel Feller	(Germany) Linus Straßer	(Norway) Timon Haugan
2025	(Norway) Henrik Kristoffersen (4)	(Switzerland) Loïc Meillard	(Norway) Timon Haugan
2026	(Norway) Atle Lie McGrath	(France) Clément Noël	(Brazil) Lucas Pinheiro Braathen

=== Downhill ===
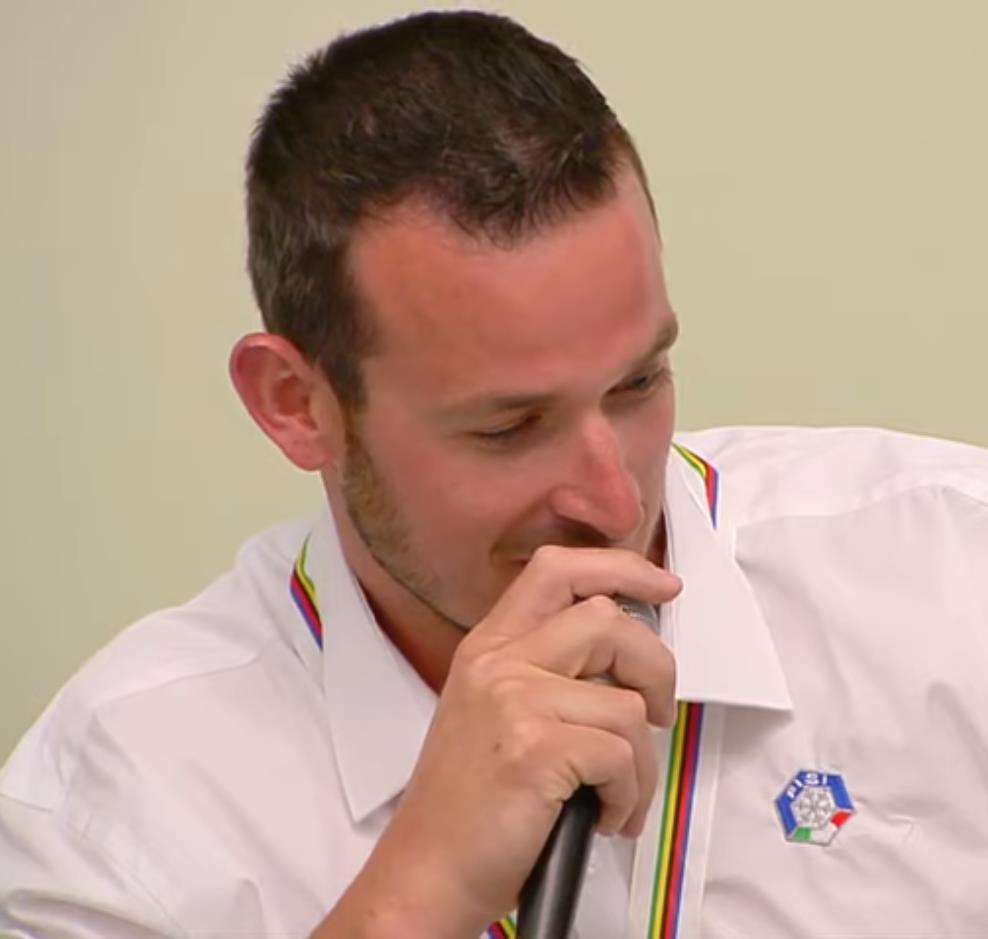
Dominik Paris, 17 downhill victories (4th all-time), 6 podiums in the discipline standings, but never a small globe won.

In the following table men's downhill World Cup season-end podiums since first edition in 1967.

Season	1st	2nd	3rd
1967	(France) Jean-Claude Killy	(France) Guy Périllat	(Germany) Franz Vogler
1968	(Austria) Gerhard Nenning	(France) Jean-Claude Killy	(Austria) Karl Schranz
1969	(Austria) Karl Schranz	(France) Henri Duvillard	(Austria) Heinrich Messner
1970	(Austria) Karl Schranz (2) (Austria) Karl Cordin		(France) Henri Duvillard
1971	(Switzerland) Bernhard Russi	(France) Bernard Orcel	(Austria) Karl Cordin
1972	(Switzerland) Bernhard Russi (2)	(Austria) Karl Schranz	(United States) Mike Lafferty
1973	(Switzerland) Roland Collombin	(Switzerland) Bernhard Russi	(Italy) Marcello Varallo
1974	(Switzerland) Roland Collombin (2)	(Austria) Franz Klammer	(Italy) Herbert Plank
1975	(Austria) Franz Klammer	(Austria) Werner Grissmann	(Italy) Herbert Plank
1976	(Austria) Franz Klammer (2)	(Italy) Herbert Plank	(Switzerland) Bernhard Russi
1977	(Austria) Franz Klammer (3)	(Austria) Josef Walcher	(Switzerland) Bernhard Russi
1978	(Austria) Franz Klammer (4)	(Austria) Josef Walcher	(Italy) Herbert Plank
1979	(Switzerland) Peter Mueller	(Austria) Peter Wirnsberger	(Switzerland) Toni Bürgler
1980	(Switzerland) Peter Mueller (2)	(Canada) Ken Read	(Italy) Herbert Plank
1981	(Austria) Harti Weirather	(Canada) Steve Podborski	(Switzerland) Peter Mueller
1982	(Canada) Steve Podborski ^{[B]}	(Switzerland) Peter Mueller	(Austria) Harti Weirather
1983	(Austria) Franz Klammer (5)	(Switzerland) Conradin Cathomen	(Austria) Harti Weirather
1984	(Switzerland) Urs Raeber	(Austria) Erwin Resch	(United States) Bill Johnson
1985	(Austria) Helmut Hoeflehner	(Switzerland) Peter Mueller	(Switzerland) Karl Alpiger
1986	(Austria) Peter Wirnsberger	(Switzerland) Peter Mueller	(Italy) Michael Mair
1987	(Switzerland) Pirmin Zurbriggen	(Switzerland) Peter Mueller	(Switzerland) Franz Heinzer
1988	(Switzerland) Pirmin Zurbriggen (2)	(Italy) Michael Mair	(Canada) Rob Boyd
1989	(Luxembourg) Marc Girardelli	(Austria) Helmut Hoeflehner	(Switzerland) Daniel Mahrer
1990	(Austria) Helmut Hoeflehner (2)	(Norway) Atle Skardal	(Switzerland) Pirmin Zurbriggen
1991	(Switzerland) Franz Heinzer	(Norway) Atle Skardal	(Switzerland) Daniel Mahrer
1992	(Switzerland) Franz Heinzer (2)	(Switzerland) Daniel Mahrer	(United States) A.J. Kitt
1993	(Switzerland) Franz Heinzer (3)	(Norway) Atle Skardal	(Switzerland) William Besse
1994	(Luxembourg) Marc Girardelli (2)	(Austria) Hannes Trinkl	(Austria) Patrick Ortlieb
1995	(France) Luc Alphand	(Italy) Kristian Ghedina	(Austria) Patrick Ortlieb
1996	(France) Luc Alphand (2)	(Austria) Guenther Mader	(Austria) Patrick Ortlieb
1997	(France) Luc Alphand (3)	(Italy) Kristian Ghedina	(Austria) Fritz Strobl
1998	(Austria) Andreas Schifferer	(Austria) Hermann Maier	(France) Nicolas Burtin
1999	(Norway) Lasse Kjus	(Austria) Andreas Schifferer	(Austria) Werner Franz
2000	(Austria) Hermann Maier	(Italy) Kristian Ghedina	(Austria) Josef Strobl
2001	(Austria) Hermann Maier (2)	(Austria) Stephan Eberharter	(Austria) Fritz Strobl
2002	(Austria) Stephan Eberharter	(Austria) Fritz Strobl	(Italy) Kristian Ghedina
2003	(Austria) Stephan Eberharter (2)	(United States) Daron Rahlves	(Austria) Michael Walchhofer
2004	(Austria) Stephan Eberharter (3)	(United States) Daron Rahlves	(Austria) Hermann Maier
2005	(Austria) Michael Walchhofer	(United States) Bode Miller	(Austria) Hermann Maier
2006	(Austria) Michael Walchhofer (2)	(Austria) Fritz Strobl	(United States) Daron Rahlves
2007	(Switzerland) Didier Cuche	(Liechtenstein) Marco Buechel	(Canada) Erik Guay
2008	(Switzerland) Didier Cuche (2)	(United States) Bode Miller	(Austria) Michael Walchhofer
2009	(Austria) Michael Walchhofer (3)	(Austria) Klaus Kroell	(Switzerland) Didier Defago
2010	(Switzerland) Didier Cuche (3)	(Switzerland) Carlo Janka	(Italy) Werner Heel
2011	(Switzerland) Didier Cuche (4)	(Austria) Michael Walchhofer	(Austria) Klaus Kroell
2012	(Austria) Klaus Kroell	(Switzerland) Beat Feuz	(Switzerland) Didier Cuche
2013	(Norway) Aksel Lund Svindal	(Austria) Klaus Kroell	(Italy) Dominik Paris
2014	(Norway) Aksel Lund Svindal (2)	(Austria) Hannes Reichelt	(Canada) Erik Guay
2015	(Norway) Kjetil Jansrud	(Austria) Hannes Reichelt	(France) Guillermo Fayed
2016	(Italy) Peter Fill	(Norway) Aksel Lund Svindal	(Italy) Dominik Paris
2017	(Italy) Peter Fill (2)	(Norway) Kjetil Jansrud	(Italy) Dominik Paris
2018	(Switzerland) Beat Feuz	(Norway) Aksel Lund Svindal	(Germany) Thomas Dreßen
2019	(Switzerland) Beat Feuz (2)	(Italy) Dominik Paris	(Austria) Vincent Kriechmayr
2020	(Switzerland) Beat Feuz (3)	(Germany) Thomas Dreßen	(Austria) Matthias Mayer
2021	(Switzerland) Beat Feuz (4)	(Austria) Matthias Mayer	(Italy) Dominik Paris
2022	(Norway) Aleksander Aamodt Kilde	(Switzerland) Beat Feuz	(Italy) Dominik Paris
2023	(Norway) Aleksander Aamodt Kilde (2)	(Austria) Vincent Kriechmayr	(Switzerland) Marco Odermatt
2024	(Switzerland) Marco Odermatt	(France) Cyprien Sarrazin	(Italy) Dominik Paris
2025	(Switzerland) Marco Odermatt (2)	(Switzerland) Franjo von Allmen	(Switzerland) Alexis Monney
2026	(Switzerland) Marco Odermatt (3)	(Switzerland) Franjo von Allmen	(Italy) Dominik Paris

=== Giant slalom ===
In the following table men's giant slalom World Cup season-end podiums since first edition in 1967.

Season	1st	2nd	3rd
1967	(France) Jean-Claude Killy	(France) Georges Mauduit	(United States) Jimmy Heuga
1968	(France) Jean-Claude Killy (2)	(Switzerland) Edmund Bruggmann	(Austria) Herbert Huber
1969	(Austria) Karl Schranz	(Austria) Reinhard Tritscher	(France) Jean-Noel Augert
1970	(Italy) Gustav Thöni	(France) Patrick Russel	(Switzerland) Dumeng Giovanoli
1971	(France) Patrick Russel (Italy) Gustav Thoni (2)		(Switzerland) Edmund Bruggmann
1972	(Italy) Gustav Thoni (3)	(Switzerland) Edmund Bruggmann	(France) Roger Rossat-Mignod
1973	(Austria) Hans Hinterseer	(Norway) Erik Håker	(Switzerland) Adolf Rösti
1974	(Italy) Piero Gros	(Austria) Hans Hinterseer	(Italy) Gustav Thöni
1975	(Sweden) Ingemar Stenmark	(Italy) Piero Gros	(Norway) Erik Håker
1976	(Sweden) Ingemar Stenmark (2)	(Italy) Gustav Thöni	(Italy) Piero Gros
1977	(Switzerland) Heini Hemmi ^{[B]}	(Sweden) Ingemar Stenmark	(Austria) Klaus Heidegger
1978	(Sweden) Ingemar Stenmark (3)	(Liechtenstein) Andreas Wenzel	(United States) Phil Mahre
1979	(Sweden) Ingemar Stenmark (4)	(Switzerland) Peter Lüscher	(Socialist Federal Republic of Yugoslavia) Bojan Križaj
1980	(Sweden) Ingemar Stenmark (5)	(Austria) Hans Enn	(Switzerland) Jacques Lüthy
1981	(Sweden) Ingemar Stenmark (6)	(Soviet Union) Alexander Zhirov	(United States) Phil Mahre
1982	(United States) Phil Mahre	(Sweden) Ingemar Stenmark	(Luxembourg) Marc Girardelli
1983	(United States) Phil Mahre (2)	(Sweden) Ingemar Stenmark	(Switzerland) Max Julen
1984	(Sweden) Ingemar Stenmark (7)^{[B]}	(Switzerland) Pirmin Zurbriggen	(Austria) Hans Enn
1985	(Luxembourg) Marc Girardelli	(Switzerland) Pirmin Zurbriggen	(Switzerland) Thomas Bürgler
1986	(Switzerland) Joel Gaspoz	(Sweden) Ingemar Stenmark	(Austria) Hubert Strolz
1987	(Switzerland) Pirmin Zurbriggen ^{[B]}	(Switzerland) Joel Gaspoz	(Italy) Richard Pramotton
1988	(Italy) Alberto Tomba	(Austria) Hubert Strolz	(Austria) Helmut Mayer
1989	(Norway) Ole-Christian Furuseth ^{[B]}	(Switzerland) Pirmin Zurbriggen	(Austria) Rudolf Nierlich
1990	(Norway) Ole-Christian Furuseth (2)^{[B]}	(Austria) Günther Mader	(Austria) Hubert Strolz
1991	(Italy) Alberto Tomba (2)	(Austria) Rudolf Nierlich	(Luxembourg) Marc Girardelli
1992	(Italy) Alberto Tomba (3)	(Switzerland) Hans Pieren	(Switzerland) Paul Accola
1993	(Norway) Kjetil-Andre Aamodt	(Italy) Alberto Tomba	(Luxembourg) Marc Girardelli
1994	(Austria) Christian Mayer	(Norway) Kjetil-Andre Aamodt	(France) Franck Piccard
1995	(Italy) Alberto Tomba (4)	(Slovenia) Jure Košir	(Norway) Harald Strand Nilsen
1996	(Switzerland) Michael von Grünigen	(Switzerland) Urs Kälin	(Norway) Lasse Kjus
1997	(Switzerland) Michael von Grünigen (2)	(Norway) Kjetil-Andre Aamodt	(Austria) Hans Knauß
1998	(Austria) Hermann Maier	(Switzerland) Michael von Grünigen	(Austria) Christian Mayer
1999	(Switzerland) Michael von Grünigen (3)	(Austria) Stephan Eberharter	(Austria) Hermann Maier
2000	(Austria) Hermann Maier (2)	(Austria) Christian Mayer	(Switzerland) Michael von Grünigen
2001	(Austria) Hermann Maier (3)	(Switzerland) Michael von Grünigen	(United States) Erik Schlopy
2002	(France) Frederic Covili	(Austria) Benjamin Raich	(Austria) Stephan Eberharter
2003	(Switzerland) Michael von Grünigen (4)	(United States) Bode Miller	(Austria) Hans Knauß
2004	(United States) Bode Miller	(Finland) Kalle Palander	(Italy) Massimiliano Blardone
2005	(Austria) Benjamin Raich	(United States) Bode Miller	(Canada) Thomas Grandi
2006	(Austria) Benjamin Raich (2)	(Italy) Massimiliano Blardone	(Sweden) Fredrik Nyberg
2007	(Norway) Aksel Lund Svindal	(Italy) Massimiliano Blardone	(Austria) Benjamin Raich
2008	(United States) Ted Ligety	(Austria) Benjamin Raich	(Italy) Manfred Mölgg
2009	(Switzerland) Didier Cuche	(Austria) Benjamin Raich	(United States) Ted Ligety
2010	(United States) Ted Ligety (2)	(Switzerland) Carlo Janka	(Austria) Benjamin Raich
2011	(United States) Ted Ligety (3)	(Norway) Aksel Lund Svindal	(France) Cyprien Richard
2012	(Austria) Marcel Hirscher	(United States) Ted Ligety	(Italy) Massimiliano Blardone
2013	(United States) Ted Ligety (4)	(Austria) Marcel Hirscher	(France) Alexis Pinturault
2014	(United States) Ted Ligety (5)	(Austria) Marcel Hirscher	(France) Alexis Pinturault
2015	(Austria) Marcel Hirscher (2)	(France) Alexis Pinturault	(United States) Ted Ligety
2016	(Austria) Marcel Hirscher (3)	(France) Alexis Pinturault	(Norway) Henrik Kristoffersen
2017	(Austria) Marcel Hirscher (4)	(France) Mathieu Faivre	(France) Alexis Pinturault
2018	(Austria) Marcel Hirscher (5)	(Norway) Henrik Kristoffersen	(France) Alexis Pinturault
2019	(Austria) Marcel Hirscher (6)	(Norway) Henrik Kristoffersen	(France) Alexis Pinturault
2020	(Norway) Henrik Kristoffersen	(France) Alexis Pinturault	(Croatia) Filip Zubčić
2021	(France) Alexis Pinturault	(Switzerland) Marco Odermatt	(Croatia) Filip Zubčić
2022	(Switzerland) Marco Odermatt	(Norway) Henrik Kristoffersen	(Austria) Manuel Feller
2023	(Switzerland) Marco Odermatt (2)	(Norway) Henrik Kristoffersen	(Slovenia) Žan Kranjec
2024	(Switzerland) Marco Odermatt (3)	(Switzerland) Loïc Meillard	(Croatia) Filip Zubčić
2025	(Switzerland) Marco Odermatt (4)	(Norway) Henrik Kristoffersen	(Switzerland) Loïc Meillard
2026	(Brazil) Lucas Pinheiro Braathen	(Switzerland) Marco Odermatt	(Switzerland) Loïc Meillard

=== Super-G ===
In the following table men's super-G World Cup season-end podiums since first edition in 1986.

Season	1st	2nd	3rd
1986	(Germany) Markus Wasmeier	(Switzerland) Pirmin Zurbriggen	(Luxembourg) Marc Girardelli
1987	(Switzerland) Pirmin Zurbriggen	(Luxembourg) Marc Girardelli	(Germany) Markus Wasmeier
1988	(Switzerland) Pirmin Zurbriggen (2)	(Germany) Markus Wasmeier	(France) Franck Piccard
1989	(Switzerland) Pirmin Zurbriggen (3)	(Sweden) Lars-Börje Eriksson	(France) Franck Piccard
1990	(Switzerland) Pirmin Zurbriggen (4)	(Austria) Günther Mader	(Sweden) Lars-Börje Eriksson
1991	(Switzerland) Franz Heinzer	(Austria) Stephan Eberharter	(Norway) Atle Skaardal
1992	(Switzerland) Paul Accola	(Luxembourg) Marc Girardelli	(Austria) Günther Mader
1993	(Norway) Kjetil-Andre Aamodt	(Austria) Günther Mader	(Switzerland) Franz Heinzer
1994	(Norway) Jan Einar Thorsen	(Luxembourg) Marc Girardelli	(United States) Tommy Moe
1995	(Italy) Peter Runggaldier	(Austria) Günther Mader	(Italy) Werner Perathoner
1996	(Norway) Atle Skaardal	(Austria) Hans Knauß	(Norway) Lasse Kjus
1997	(France) Luc Alphand	(Austria) Josef Strobl	(Austria) Andreas Schifferer
1998	(Austria) Hermann Maier	(Austria) Hans Knauß	(Austria) Stephan Eberharter
1999	(Austria) Hermann Maier (2)	(Austria) Stephan Eberharter	(Austria) Andreas Schifferer
2000	(Austria) Hermann Maier (3)	(Austria) Werner Franz	(Austria) Fritz Strobl
2001	(Austria) Hermann Maier (4)	(Austria) Christoph Gruber	(Austria) Josef Strobl
2002	(Austria) Stephan Eberharter	(Switzerland) Didier Cuche	(Austria) Fritz Strobl
2003	(Austria) Stephan Eberharter (2)	(Liechtenstein) Marco Büchel	(Switzerland) Didier Cuche
2004	(Austria) Hermann Maier (5)	(United States) Daron Rahlves	(Austria) Stephan Eberharter
2005	(United States) Bode Miller	(Austria) Hermann Maier	(United States) Daron Rahlves
2006	(Norway) Aksel Lund Svindal	(Austria) Hermann Maier	(United States) Daron Rahlves
2007	(United States) Bode Miller (2)	(Switzerland) Didier Cuche	(Canada) John Kucera
2008	(Austria) Hannes Reichelt	(Switzerland) Didier Cuche	(Austria) Benjamin Raich
2009	(Norway) Aksel Lund Svindal (2)	(Italy) Werner Heel	(Switzerland) Didier Defago
2010	(Canada) Erik Guay	(Austria) Michael Walchhofer	(Norway) Aksel Lund Svindal
2011	(Switzerland) Didier Cuche	(Austria) Georg Streitberger	(Croatia) Ivica Kostelić
2012	(Norway) Aksel Lund Svindal (3)	(Switzerland) Didier Cuche	(Switzerland) Beat Feuz
2013	(Norway) Aksel Lund Svindal (4)	(Italy) Matteo Marsaglia	(Austria) Matthias Mayer
2014	(Norway) Aksel Lund Svindal (5)	(Norway) Kjetil Jansrud	(Switzerland) Patrick Küng
2015	(Norway) Kjetil Jansrud	(Italy) Dominik Paris	(Austria) Matthias Mayer
2016	(Norway) Aleksander Aamodt Kilde	(Norway) Kjetil Jansrud	(Norway) Aksel Lund Svindal
2017	(Norway) Kjetil Jansrud (2)	(Austria) Hannes Reichelt	(Norway) Aleksander Aamodt Kilde
2018	(Norway) Kjetil Jansrud (3)	(Austria) Vincent Kriechmayr	(Norway) Aksel Lund Svindal
2019	(Italy) Dominik Paris	(Austria) Vincent Kriechmayr	(Switzerland) Mauro Caviezel
2020	(Switzerland) Mauro Caviezel	(Austria) Vincent Kriechmayr	(Norway) Aleksander Aamodt Kilde
2021	(Austria) Vincent Kriechmayr	(Switzerland) Marco Odermatt	(Austria) Matthias Mayer
2022	(Norway) Aleksander Aamodt Kilde (2)	(Switzerland) Marco Odermatt	(Austria) Vincent Kriechmayr
2023	(Switzerland) Marco Odermatt	(Norway) Aleksander Aamodt Kilde	(Austria) Vincent Kriechmayr
2024	(Switzerland) Marco Odermatt (2)	(Austria) Vincent Kriechmayr	(Austria) Raphael Haaser
2025	(Switzerland) Marco Odermatt (3)	(Switzerland) Stefan Rogentin	(Austria) Vincent Kriechmayr
2026	(Switzerland) Marco Odermatt (4)	(Austria) Vincent Kriechmayr	(Austria) Raphael Haaser

=== Combined ===
In the following table men's combined World Cup season-end podiums since first edition in 1975.

Season	1st	2nd	3rd
Classic Combined
1975	not awarded		
1976 ^{[A]}	(Switzerland) Walter Tresch	(Italy) Gustav Thöni	(Canada) Jim Hunter
1977	not awarded		
1978	not held		
1979	not awarded		
1980 ^{[A]}	(United States) Phil Mahre	(Liechtenstein) Andreas Wenzel	(Austria) Anton Steiner
1981 ^{[A]}	(United States) Phil Mahre (2)	(Liechtenstein) Andreas Wenzel	(Switzerland) Peter Müller
1982 ^{[A]}	(United States) Phil Mahre (3)	(Liechtenstein) Andreas Wenzel	(Norway) Even Hole
1983 ^{[A]}	(United States) Phil Mahre (4)	(Switzerland) Peter Lüscher	(Luxembourg) Marc Girardelli (Switzerland) Pirmin Zurbriggen
1984 ^{[A]}	(Liechtenstein) Andreas Wenzel (2)	(Switzerland) Pirmin Zurbriggen	(Austria) Anton Steiner
1985 ^{[A]}	(Liechtenstein) Andreas Wenzel (3)	(Switzerland) Franz Heinzer	(Switzerland) Peter Müller
1986 ^{[A]}	(Switzerland) Pirmin Zurbriggen	(Luxembourg) Marc Girardelli	(Germany) Markus Wasmeier
1987 ^{[A]}	(Switzerland) Pirmin Zurbriggen (2)	(Liechtenstein) Andreas Wenzel	
1988 ^{[A]}	(Austria) Hubert Strolz	(Austria) Günther Mader	(France) Franck Piccard
1989 ^{[A]}	(Luxembourg) Marc Girardelli	(Germany) Markus Wasmeier	(Switzerland) Pirmin Zurbriggen
1990 ^{[A]}	(Switzerland) Pirmin Zurbriggen (3)	(Switzerland) Paul Accola	(Germany) Markus Wasmeier
1991 ^{[A]}	(Luxembourg) Marc Girardelli (2)	(Norway) Lasse Kjus	(Austria) Günther Mader
1992 ^{[A]}	(Switzerland) Paul Accola	(Austria) Hubert Strolz	(Germany) Markus Wasmeier
1993 ^{[A]}	(Luxembourg) Marc Girardelli (3)	(Austria) Günther Mader	(Norway) Kjetil André Aamodt
1994 ^{[A]}	(Norway) Kjetil André Aamodt (Norway) Lasse Kjus		(Norway) Harald Strand Nilsen
1995 ^{[A]}	(Luxembourg) Marc Girardelli (4)	(Norway) Harald Strand Nilsen	(Norway) Lasse Kjus
1996 ^{[A]}	(Austria) Günther Mader	(Luxembourg) Marc Girardelli	(Italy) Alessandro Fattori
1997 ^{[A]}	(Norway) Kjetil André Aamodt(2)	(Norway) Lasse Kjus (Austria) Günther Mader	
1998 ^{[A]}	(Austria) Werner Franz	(Norway) Kjetil André Aamodt (Austria) Hermann Maier	
1999 ^{[A]}	(Norway) Kjetil André Aamodt(3) (Norway) Lasse Kjus(2)		(Austria) Werner Franz
2000 ^{[A]}	(Norway) Kjetil André Aamodt(4)	(Austria) Hermann Maier	(Sweden) Frederik Nyberg
2001 ^{[A]}	(Norway) Lasse Kjus (3)	(Norway) Kjetil André Aamodt (Austria) Michael Walchhofer	
2002 ^{[A]}	(Norway) Kjetil André Aamodt(5)	(Norway) Lasse Kjus	(Slovenia) Andrej Jerman
2003 ^{[A]}	(United States) Bode Miller	(Norway) Kjetil André Aamodt (Austria) Michael Walchhofer	
2004 ^{[A]}	(United States) Bode Miller (2)	(Austria) Benjamin Raich	(Norway) Lasse Kjus
Classic + Super Combined
2005 ^{[A]}	(Austria) Benjamin Raich	(Norway) Lasse Kjus	(Switzerland) Didier Défago
2006 ^{[A]}	(Austria) Benjamin Raich (2)	(United States) Bode Miller (Austria) Michael Walchhofer	
2007	(Norway) Aksel Lund Svindal	(Switzerland) Marc Berthod	(Croatia) Ivica Kostelić
2008	(United States) Bode Miller (3)	(Croatia) Ivica Kostelić	(Switzerland) Daniel Albrecht
2009	(Switzerland) Carlo Janka	(Switzerland) Silvan Zurbriggen	(Austria) Romed Baumann
2010	(Austria) Benjamin Raich (3)	(Switzerland) Carlo Janka	(Croatia) Ivica Kostelić
2011	(Croatia) Ivica Kostelić	(Italy) Christof Innerhofer	(Norway) Kjetil Jansrud
2012	(Croatia) Ivica Kostelić (2)	(Switzerland) Beat Feuz	(Austria) Romed Baumann
2013 ^{[A]}	(Croatia) Ivica Kostelić (3) (France) Alexis Pinturault		(France) T. Mermillod Blondin
Super Combined
2014 ^{[A]}	(United States) Ted Ligety (France) Alexis Pinturault (2)		(France) T. Mermillod Blondin
Alpine Combined
2015 ^{[A]}	(Switzerland) Carlo Janka (2)	(France) Alexis Pinturault	(France) Victor Muffat-Jeandet
2016	(France) Alexis Pinturault (3)	(France) Thomas Mermillod Blondin	(Norway) Kjetil Jansrud
2017	(France) Alexis Pinturault (4)	(Switzerland) Niels Hintermann	(Norway) Aleksander Aamodt Kilde
2018	(Italy) Peter Fill	(Norway) Kjetil Jansrud	(France) Victor Muffat-Jeandet
2019	(France) Alexis Pinturault (5)	(Austria) Marco Schwarz	(Switzerland) Mauro Caviezel
2020	(France) Alexis Pinturault (6)	(Norway) Aleksander Aamodt Kilde	(Austria) Matthias Mayer

According to 1986 the combined title hasn't been awarded during the 1987 and 2006 quoting: This was the first season in which a separate discipline championship was awarded for Super G, which had been introduced as a part of giant slalom in the 1983 season. The addition increased the number of discipline champions to five, which led to the elimination of the Combined discipline championship the next season. Combined would not award another World Cup discipline championship until after the introduction of the "Super Combined" (downhill/slalom) or "Alpine combined" (Super G/slalom) races, but that championship would only last from the 2006/07 season until it was again eliminated after the 2011/12 season.

=== Parallel ===
In the following table men's Parallel World Cup season-end podiums since first season in 2020.

Season	1st	2nd	3rd
2020	(Switzerland) Loïc Meillard	(Norway) Rasmus Windingstad	(Germany) Stefan Luitz
2021 ^{[A]}	(France) Alexis Pinturault	(Norway) Henrik Kristoffersen	(Germany) Alexander Schmid
2022 ^{[A]}	(Austria) Christian Hirschbühl	(Austria) Dominik Raschner	(Norway) Atle Lie McGrath

== See also ==
- List of FIS Alpine Ski World Cup winners of women's discipline titles
- List of FIS Alpine Ski World Cup men's champions
- List of FIS Alpine Ski World Cup women's champions

== Notes ==
- A ^{a} Discipline globe not officially awarded that season.
- B ^{b} The skiers were tied on points that season. Although the official FIS website states that both skiers are first in the standings, some sources claim that only one skier is first while the other one is second.

.
