= 1991 Alpine Skiing World Cup – Men's downhill =

1991 Men's downhill World Cup
Previous: 1990	Next: 1992

Men's downhill World Cup 1990/1991

== Calendar ==
Round	Race No	Place	Country	Date	Winner	Second	Third
1	4	Val d'Isère	France	December 8, 1990	(Austria) Leonhard Stock	(Switzerland) Franz Heinzer	(Austria) Peter Wirnsberger
2	6	Val Gardena	Italy	December 14, 1990	(Switzerland) Franz Heinzer	(Germany) Berni Huber	(Norway) Atle Skårdal
3	7	Val Gardena	Italy	December 15, 1990	(Norway) Atle Skårdal	(Canada) Rob Boyd	(France) Luc Alphand
4	12	Garmisch-Partenkirchen	Germany	January 5, 1991	(Switzerland) Daniel Mahrer	(Norway) Atle Skårdal (Germany) Hannes Zehentner
5	14	Kitzbühel	Austria	January 12, 1991	(Switzerland) Franz Heinzer	(Italy) Peter Runggaldier	(Canada) Rob Boyd
6	21	Aspen	United States	March 8, 1991	(Switzerland) Franz Heinzer	(Norway) Atle Skårdal	(Austria) Helmut Höflehner
7	24	Lake Louise	Canada	March 15, 1991	(Norway) Atle Skårdal	(Switzerland) Franz Heinzer	(Austria) Helmut Höflehner
8	25	Lake Louise	Canada	March 16, 1991	(Switzerland) Franz Heinzer	(Norway) Atle Skårdal	(Austria) Patrick Ortlieb

== Final point standings ==
In men's downhill World Cup 1990/91 all results count.

Place	Name	Country	Total points	4 (France)	6 (Italy)	7 (Italy)	12 (Germany)	14 (Austria)	21 (United States)	24 (Canada)	25 (Canada)
1	Franz Heinzer	Switzerland	159	20	25	11	8	25	25	20	25
2	Atle Skårdal	Norway	125	-	15	25	20	-	20	25	20
3	Daniel Mahrer	Switzerland	81	7	11	6	25	10	-	10	12
4	Helmut Höflehner	Austria	64	-	-	-	12	11	15	15	11
5	Rob Boyd	Canada	62	-	9	20	10	15	-	4	4
6	Patrick Ortlieb	Austria	56	11	4	4	-	-	11	11	15
7	Hannes Zehentner	Germany	50	12	10	8	20	-	-	-	-
	Leonhard Stock	Austria	50	25	-	5	-	-	12	8	-
9	William Besse	Switzerland	47	-	6	10	4	-	10	7	10
10	Lasse Arnesen	Norway	44	8	12	12	12	-	-	-	-
11	Kristian Ghedina	Italy	40	-	7	2	7	12	5	-	7
12	Jan Einar Thorsen	Norway	36	10	-	-	6	-	5	9	6
13	Berni Huber	Germany	30	-	20	-	10	-	-	-	-
14	Peter Wirnsberger	Austria	26	15	-	-	5	6	-	-	-
15	Niklas Henning	Sweden	24	-	9	9	-	-	-	6	-
16	Peter Runggaldier	Italy	23	-	-	-	-	20	3	-	-
17	Luc Alphand	France	22	3	2	15	-	-	2	-	-
18	A. J. Kitt	United States	21	-	1	7	-	1	-	12	-
19	Karl Alpiger	Switzerland	14	9	5	-	-	-	-	-	-
20	Bernhard Fahner	Switzerland	13	-	-	-	1	-	9	-	3
21	Franck Piccard	France	11	2	-	-	2	7	-	-	-
	Xavier Gigandet	Switzerland	11	-	-	-	-	3	-	-	8
23	Peter Müller	Switzerland	10	-	-	-	-	-	7	3	-
	Christophe Plé	France	10	-	-	-	-	-	8	2	-
	Brian Stemmle	Canada	10	6	1	-	-	-	-	1	2
26	Erwin Resch	Austria	9	-	-	-	-	9	-	-	-
	Peter Rzehak	Austria	9	-	-	-	-	-	-	-	9
28	Marc Girardelli	Luxembourg	8	-	-	-	-	8	-	-	-
29	Tommy Moe	United States	7	1	3	3	-	-	-	-	-
	Ed Podivinsky	Canada	7	-	-	-	-	-	2	-	5
31	Felix Belczyk	Canada	6	-	-	-	-	-	6	-	-
	Denis Rey	France	6	5	-	-	-	-	-	-	1
33	Lasse Kjus	Norway	5	5	-	-	-	-	-	-	-
	Armin Assinger	Austria	5	-	-	-	-	5	-	-	-
	Günther Mader	Austria	5	-	-	-	-	-	-	5	-
36	Hans-Jörg Tauscher	Germany	4	-	-	1	3	-	-	-	-
	Lukas Perathoner	Italy	4	-	-	-	-	4	-	-	-
38	Michael Mair	Italy	2	-	-	-	-	2	-	-	-
39	Kyle Rasmussen	United States	1	1	-	-	-	-	-	-	-

== Men's downhill team results ==
bold indicate highest score - italics indicate race wins

Place	Country	Total points	4 (France)	6 (Italy)	7 (Italy)	12 (Germany)	14 (Austria)	21 (United States)	24 (Canada)	25 (Canada)	Racers	Wins
1	Switzerland	335	36	47	27	38	38	51	40	**58**	7	5
2	Austria	224	51	4	9	17	31	38	39	35	8	1
3	Norway	210	23	27	37	38	-	25	34	26	4	2
4	Canada	85	6	10	20	10	15	8	5	11	4	0
5	Germany	84	12	30	9	33	-	-	-	-	3	0
6	Italy	69	-	7	2	7	38	8	-	7	4	0
7	France	49	10	2	15	2	7	10	2	1	4	0
8	United States	29	2	4	10	-	1	-	12	-	3	0
9	Sweden	24	-	9	9	-	-	-	6	-	1	0
10	Luxembourg	8	-	-	-	-	8	-	-	-	1	0

**Alpine Skiing World Cup**
**Men**

Overall | Downhill | Super G | Giant slalom | Slalom | Combined

**1991**
