= 1990 Alpine Skiing World Cup – Men's downhill =

1990 Men's downhill World Cup
Previous: 1989	Next: 1991

Men's downhill World Cup 1989/1990

== Calendar ==
Round	Race No	Place	Country	Date	Winner	Second	Third
1	10	Val Gardena	Italy	December 16, 1989	(Switzerland) Pirmin Zurbriggen	(Switzerland) Franz Heinzer	(Italy) Kristian Ghedina
2	13	Schladming	Austria	January 11, 1990	(France) Franck Piccard	(Italy) Kristian Ghedina	(Switzerland) Daniel Mahrer
3	17	Kitzbühel	Austria	January 20, 1990	(Norway) Atle Skårdal	(Austria) Helmut Höflehner	(Switzerland) Pirmin Zurbriggen
4	21	Val d'Isère	France	January 27, 1990	(Austria) Helmut Höflehner	(Norway) Atle Skårdal	(Switzerland) William Besse
5	22	Val d'Isère	France	January 29, 1990	(Austria) Helmut Höflehner	(Switzerland) William Besse	(Switzerland) Franz Heinzer
6	25	Cortina d'Ampezzo	Italy	February 3, 1990	(Italy) Kristian Ghedina	(Switzerland) Daniel Mahrer	(Austria) Helmut Höflehner
7	26	Cortina d'Ampezzo	Italy	February 4, 1990	(Austria) Helmut Höflehner	(Norway) Atle Skårdal (Switzerland) Franz Heinzer
8	33	Åre	Sweden	March 15, 1990	(Italy) Kristian Ghedina	(Switzerland) Franz Heinzer	(Austria) Helmut Höflehner
9	34	Åre	Sweden	March 17, 1990	(Norway) Atle Skårdal	(Austria) Helmut Höflehner	(Canada) Felix Belczyk

Note:

Round 3 was the first ever held downhill sprint in two heats.

== Final point standings ==
In men's downhill World Cup 1989/90 all results count.

Place	Name	Country	Total points	10 (Italy)	13 (Austria)	17 (Austria)	21 (France)	22 (France)	25 (Italy)	26 (Italy)	33 (Sweden)	34 (Sweden)
1	Helmut Höflehner	Austria	166	10	11	20	25	25	15	25	15	20
2	Atle Skårdal	Norway	120	-	-	25	20	9	10	20	11	25
3	Pirmin Zurbriggen	Switzerland	105	25	9	15	11	11	11	10	8	5
4	Daniel Mahrer	Switzerland	88	5	15	8	5	12	20	12	-	11
	William Besse	Switzerland	88	12	5	12	15	20	-	6	9	9
6	Kristian Ghedina	Italy	87	15	20	-	-	-	25	1	25	1
7	Franz Heinzer	Switzerland	84	20	-	8	-	15	1	20	20	-
8	Felix Belczyk	Canada	49	-	-	-	9	6	7	2	10	15
9	Roman Rupp	Austria	38	-	-	10	6	10	4	8	-	-
10	Bernhard Fahner	Switzerland	35	11	-	9	3	-	9	3	-	-
11	Peter Wirnsberger	Austria	34	9	-	-	-	-	6	7	12	-
12	Danilo Sbardellotto	Italy	28	-	-	-	-	-	-	11	5	12
13	Franck Piccard	France	27	-	25	2	-	-	-	-	-	-
14	Rob Boyd	Canada	24	4	-	-	-	3	5	-	4	8
15	Hannes Zehentner	West Germany	22	-	-	-	8	8	-	6	-	-
	A. J. Kitt	United States	22	-	-	-	-	-	12	-	-	10
17	Patrick Ortlieb	Austria	20	8	1	11	-	-	-	-	-	-
	Markus Wasmeier	West Germany	20	-	7	-	-	1	-	-	6	6
19	Mario Summermatter	Switzerland	19	-	5	4	3	7	-	-	-	-
20	Karl Alpiger	Switzerland	17	7	-	-	4	5	-	-	1	-
21	Erwin Resch	Austria	16	-	-	5	7	4	-	-	-	-
22	Berni Huber	West Germany	14	-	3	-	-	-	-	9	-	2
23	Denis Rey	France	12	-	12	-	-	-	-	-	-	-
	Christophe Fivel	France	12	-	-	-	12	-	-	-	-	-
	Luigi Colturi	Italy	12	-	-	-	10	2	-	-	-	-
26	Leonhard Stock	Austria	11	-	-	-	-	-	-	4	7	-
27	Stefan Krauß	West Germany	10	-	10	-	-	-	-	-	-	-
	Peter Runggaldier	Italy	10	2	2	6	-	-	-	-	-	-
29	Xavier Gigandet	Switzerland	9	6	-	-	-	-	3	-	-	-
	Niklas Henning	Sweden	9	-	-	-	-	-	-	-	2	7
31	Peter Rzehak	Austria	8	-	8	-	-	-	-	-	-	-
	Lasse Arnesen	Norway	8	-	-	-	-	-	8	-	-	-
33	Hans-Jörg Tauscher	West Germany	7	1	6	-	-	-	-	-	-	-
34	Pietro Vitalini	Italy	6	3	-	-	-	-	3	-	-	-
35	Lars-Börje Eriksson	Sweden	4	-	-	-	-	-	-	-	-	4
36	Bill Hudson	United States	3	-	-	3	-	-	-	-	-	-
	Ronald Duncan	United Kingdom	3	-	-	-	-	-	-	-	3	-
	Tommy Moe	United States	3	-	-	-	-	-	-	-	-	3
39	Alexey Maslov	Soviet Union	1	-	-	1	-	-	-	-	-	-
	Urs Lehmann	Switzerland	1	-	-	-	1	-	-	-	-	-

== Men's downhill team results ==
bold indicate highest score - italics indicate race wins

Place	Country	Total points	10 (Italy)	13 (Austria)	17 (Austria)	21 (France)	22 (France)	25 (Italy)	26 (Italy)	33 (Sweden)	34 (Sweden)	Racers	Wins
1	Switzerland	446	**86**	34	56	42	70	44	51	38	25	9	1
2	Austria	293	27	20	46	38	39	25	44	34	20	7	3
3	Italy	143	20	22	6	10	2	28	12	30	13	5	2
4	Norway	128	-	-	25	20	9	18	20	11	25	2	2
5	Canada	73	4	-	-	9	9	12	2	14	23	2	0
	West Germany	73	1	26	-	8	9	-	15	6	8	5	0
7	France	51	-	37	2	12	-	-	-	-	-	3	1
8	United States	28	-	-	3	-	-	12	-	-	13	3	0
9	Sweden	13	-	-	-	-	-	-	-	2	11	2	0
10	United Kingdom	3	-	-	-	-	-	-	-	3	-	1	0
11	Soviet Union	1	-	-	1	-	-	-	-	-	-	1	0

**Alpine Skiing World Cup**
**Men**

Overall | Downhill | Super G | Giant slalom | Slalom | Combined

**1990**
