= 1990–91 FIS Alpine Ski World Cup =

International sports competition

FIS Alpine Ski World Cup 1990/91
Discipline	Men	Women
Overall	(Luxembourg) Marc Girardelli	(Austria) Petra Kronberger
Downhill	(Switzerland) Franz Heinzer	(Switzerland) Chantal Bournissen
Super G	(Switzerland) Franz Heinzer	(France) Carole Merle
Giant Slalom	(Italy) Alberto Tomba	(Switzerland) Vreni Schneider
Slalom	(Luxembourg) Marc Girardelli	(Austria) Petra Kronberger
Nations Cup	Austria	Austria
- Nations Cup overall: Austria

Competition
Locations	16	13
Individual	28	29
Cancelled	3	—

The 25th World Cup season began in August 1990 in New Zealand (for men only), resumed in December, and concluded in March 1991 in the United States. The overall winners were Marc Girardelli of Luxembourg, his fourth title (the third man to reach that milestone) and Petra Kronberger of Austria (her second). This was the first season following the reunification of Germany and the last before the dissolution of Yugoslavia.

During this season, the three men's races at Wengen were cancelled after the death of Gernot Reinstadler of Austria on January 18. Reinstadler crashed during a training run for the downhill race, immediately above the finish line.

A break in the schedule was for the 1991 World Championships, held in Saalbach, Austria between January 22 and February 3, 1991.

== Calendar ==
=== Men ===
Event Key: DH – Downhill, SL – Slalom, GS – Giant Slalom, SG – Super Giant Slalom, KB – Combined, PS – Parallel Slalom (Nations Cup ranking only)
Race	Season	Date	Place	Type	Winner	Second	Third
698	1	8 August 1990	(New Zealand) Mount Hutt	SL _{213}	(West Germany) Peter Roth	(Austria) Michael Tritscher	(Italy) Alberto Tomba
699	2	9 August 1990	(New Zealand) Mount Hutt	GS _{185}	(Sweden) Fredrik Nyberg	(Norway) Lasse Kjus	(France) Franck Piccard
700	3	2 December 1990	(France) Valloire	SG _{037}	(France) Franck Piccard	(Switzerland) Franz Heinzer	(Austria) Stephan Eberharter
701	4	8 December 1990	(France) Val d'Isère	DH _{207}	(Austria) Leonhard Stock	(Switzerland) Franz Heinzer	(Austria) Peter Wirnsberger
702	5	11 December 1990	(Italy) Sestriere	SL _{214}	(Italy) Alberto Tomba	(Norway) Ole Kristian Furuseth	(Austria) Rudolf Nierlich
703	6	14 December 1990	(Italy) Val Gardena	DH _{208}	(Switzerland) Franz Heinzer	(Germany) Berni Huber	(Norway) Atle Skårdal
704	7	15 December 1990	(Italy) Val Gardena	DH _{209}	(Norway) Atle Skårdal	(Canada) Rob Boyd	(France) Luc Alphand
705	8	16 December 1990	(Italy) Alta Badia	GS _{186}	(Italy) Alberto Tomba	(Switzerland) Urs Kälin	(Luxembourg) Marc Girardelli
706	9	18 December 1990	(Italy) Madonna di Campiglio	SL _{215}	(Norway) Ole Kristian Furuseth	(Sweden) Thomas Fogdö	(Luxembourg) Marc Girardelli
707	10	21 December 1990	(Socialist Federal Republic of Yugoslavia) Kranjska Gora	GS _{187}	(Italy) Alberto Tomba	(Switzerland) Urs Kälin	(Luxembourg) Marc Girardelli
708	11	22 December 1990	(Socialist Federal Republic of Yugoslavia) Kranjska Gora	SL _{216}	(Norway) Ole Kristian Furuseth	(Sweden) Thomas Fogdö	(Austria) Thomas Stangassinger
709	12	5 January 1991	(Germany) Garmisch-Partenkirchen	DH _{210}	(Switzerland) Daniel Mahrer	(Norway) Atle Skårdal (Germany) Hannes Zehentner	
710	13	6 January 1991	(Germany) Garmisch-Partenkirchen	SG _{038}	(Austria) Günther Mader	(Switzerland) Franz Heinzer	(Luxembourg) Marc Girardelli
711	14	12 January 1991	(Austria) Kitzbühel	DH _{211}	(Switzerland) Franz Heinzer	(Italy) Peter Runggaldier	(Canada) Rob Boyd
712	15	13 January 1991	(Austria) Kitzbühel	SL _{217}	(Luxembourg) Marc Girardelli	(Norway) Ole Kristian Furuseth	(Austria) Rudolf Nierlich
713	16	13 January 1991	(Austria) Kitzbühel	KB _{059}	(Luxembourg) Marc Girardelli	(Norway) Lasse Kjus	(Austria) Günther Mader
714	17	15 January 1991	(Switzerland) Adelboden	GS _{188}	(Luxembourg) Marc Girardelli	(Italy) Alberto Tomba	(Austria) Rudolf Nierlich
		19 January 1991	(Switzerland) Wengen	DH _{cnx}	all three races cancelled after the tragic accident of Austrian skier Gernot Reinstadler at the downhill training on 18 January 1991		
		20 January 1991	(Switzerland) Wengen	SL _{cnx}	all three races cancelled after the tragic accident of Austrian skier Gernot Reinstadler at the downhill training on 18 January 1991		
		20 January 1991	(Switzerland) Wengen	KB _{cnx}	all three races cancelled after the tragic accident of Austrian skier Gernot Reinstadler at the downhill training on 18 January 1991		
1991 World Championships (22 January–3 February)
715	18	26 February 1991	(Norway) Oppdal	SL _{218}	(Austria) Rudolf Nierlich	(Switzerland) Paul Accola	(Luxembourg) Marc Girardelli
716	19	1 March 1991	(Norway) Lillehammer (Hafjell)	GS _{189}	(Italy) Alberto Tomba	(Austria) Rudolf Nierlich	(Austria) Stephan Eberharter
717	20	2 March 1991	(Norway) Lillehammer (Hafjell)	SL _{219}	(Austria) Michael Tritscher	(Austria) Thomas Stangassinger	(Switzerland) Paul Accola
718	21	8 March 1991	(United States) Aspen	DH _{212}	(Switzerland) Franz Heinzer	(Norway) Atle Skårdal	(Austria) Helmut Höflehner
719	22	9 March 1991	(United States) Aspen	GS _{190}	(Italy) Alberto Tomba	(Austria) Rudolf Nierlich	(Luxembourg) Marc Girardelli
720	23	10 March 1991	(United States) Aspen	SL _{220}	(Austria) Rudolf Nierlich	(Sweden) Thomas Fogdö	(Italy) Fabio de Crignis
721	24	15 March 1991	(Canada) Lake Louise	DH _{213}	(Norway) Atle Skårdal	(Switzerland) Franz Heinzer	(Austria) Helmut Höflehner
722	25	16 March 1991	(Canada) Lake Louise	DH _{214}	(Switzerland) Franz Heinzer	(Norway) Atle Skårdal	(Austria) Patrick Ortlieb
723	26	17 March 1991	(Canada) Lake Louise	SG _{039}	(Germany) Markus Wasmeier	(Italy) Patrick Holzer	(Austria) Stephan Eberharter
724	27	21 March 1991	(United States) Waterville Valley	GS _{191}	(Italy) Alberto Tomba	(Norway) Ole Kristian Furuseth	(Austria) Rudolf Nierlich
725	28	23 March 1991	(United States) Waterville Valley	SL _{221}	(Sweden) Thomas Fogdö	(Austria) Rudolf Nierlich (Italy) Alberto Tomba	
Nations Cup		24 March 1991	(United States) Waterville Valley	PS _{ncr}	(Switzerland) Urs Kälin	(Switzerland) Paul Accola	(Norway) Ole Kristian Furuseth

=== Ladies ===
Event Key: DH – Downhill, SL – Slalom, GS – Giant Slalom, SG – Super Giant Slalom, KB – Combined, PS – Parallel Slalom (Nations Cup ranking only)
Race	Season	Date	Place	Type	Winner	Second	Third
645	1	1 December 1990	(Italy) Val Zoldana	GS _{181}	(Austria) Petra Kronberger	(Switzerland) Vreni Schneider	(Sweden) Pernilla Wiberg
646	2	2 December 1990	(Italy) Val Zoldana	SL _{208}	(Austria) Petra Kronberger	(Austria) Ingrid Salvenmoser	(France) Patricia Chauvet
647	3	8 December 1990	(Austria) Altenmarkt-Zauchensee	DH _{173}	(Germany) Katharina Gutensohn	(Austria) Petra Kronberger	(Canada) Kerrin Lee
648	4	9 December 1990	(Austria) Altenmarkt-Zauchensee	SG _{033}	(Austria) Petra Kronberger	(Austria) Sigrid Wolf	(Austria) Anita Wachter
649	5	16 December 1990	(Switzerland) Meiringen	SG _{034}	(Switzerland) Chantal Bournissen	(Austria) Petra Kronberger	(Canada) Lucie Laroche
650	6	21 December 1990	(France) Morzine	DH _{174}	(Austria) Petra Kronberger	(Switzerland) Chantal Bournissen	(Soviet Union) Varvara Zelenskaya
651	7	22 December 1990	(France) Morzine	SL _{209}	(Spain) Blanca Fernández Ochoa	(Sweden) Pernilla Wiberg	(Switzerland) Vreni Schneider
652	8	22 December 1990	(France) Morzine	KB _{053}	(Austria) Ingrid Stöckl	(France) Florence Masnada	(Austria) Sabine Ginther
653	9	6 January 1991	(Austria) Bad Kleinkirchheim	DH _{175}	(Germany) Katharina Gutensohn	(Austria) Sabine Ginther	(Switzerland) Chantal Bournissen
654	10	7 January 1991	(Austria) Bad Kleinkirchheim	SL _{210}	(Sweden) Pernilla Wiberg	(Austria) Monika Maierhofer	(Switzerland) Christine von Grünigen
655	11	7 January 1991	(Austria) Bad Kleinkirchheim	KB _{054}	(Austria) Petra Kronberger	(Austria) Sabine Ginther	(France) Florence Masnada
656	12	11 January 1991	(Socialist Federal Republic of Yugoslavia) Kranjska Gora	GS _{182}	(Switzerland) Vreni Schneider	(Socialist Federal Republic of Yugoslavia) Nataša Bokal	(Austria) Petra Kronberger
657	13	12 January 1991	(Socialist Federal Republic of Yugoslavia) Kranjska Gora	SL _{211}	(Socialist Federal Republic of Yugoslavia) Nataša Bokal	(Austria) Monika Maierhofer	(Socialist Federal Republic of Yugoslavia) Veronika Šarec
658	14	13 January 1991	(Socialist Federal Republic of Yugoslavia) Kranjska Gora	SL _{212}	(Austria) Petra Kronberger	(Austria) Ingrid Salvenmoser	(Socialist Federal Republic of Yugoslavia) Veronika Šarec
659	15	18 January 1991	(France) Méribel	DH _{176}	(Austria) Petra Kronberger	(France) Carole Merle	(Austria) Veronika Wallinger
660	16	19 January 1991	(France) Méribel	SG _{035}	(Austria) Petra Kronberger	(Germany) Michaela Gerg	(France) Carole Merle
1991 World Championships (22 January–3 February)
661	17	8 February 1991	(Germany) Garmisch-Partenkirchen	DH _{177}	(Switzerland) Chantal Bournissen	(France) Carole Merle	(Austria) Veronika Wallinger
662	18	9 February 1991	(Germany) Garmisch-Partenkirchen	SG _{036}	(France) Carole Merle	(Germany) Karin Dedler	(Germany) Michaela Gerg
663	19	10 February 1991	(Germany) Zwiesel	GS _{183}	(Austria) Anita Wachter	(United States) Eva Twardokens	(Switzerland) Vreni Schneider
664	20	24 February 1991	(Japan) Furano	DH _{178}	(Austria) Anja Haas	(Switzerland) Chantal Bournissen	(Soviet Union) Varvara Zelenskaya
665	21	24 February 1991	(Japan) Furano	SG _{037}	(France) Carole Merle	(United States) Edith Thys	(Austria) Sabine Ginther
666	22	9 March 1991	(Canada) Lake Louise	DH _{179}	(Austria) Sabine Ginther	(Switzerland) Chantal Bournissen	(Soviet Union) Svetlana Gladysheva
667	23	10 March 1991	(Canada) Lake Louise	GS _{184}	(Sweden) Pernilla Wiberg	(Switzerland) Vreni Schneider	(Austria) Sylvia Eder
668	24	11 March 1991	(Canada) Lake Louise	SL _{213}	(Switzerland) Vreni Schneider	(Sweden) Kristina Andersson	(Austria) Anita Wachter
669	25	15 March 1991	(United States) Vail	DH _{180}	(Austria) Sabine Ginther	(Canada) Lucie Laroche	(Switzerland) Chantal Bournissen
670	26	16 March 1991	(United States) Vail	DH _{181}	(Switzerland) Chantal Bournissen	(Austria) Anja Haas	(Austria) Sabine Ginther
671	27	17 March 1991	(United States) Vail	GS _{185}	(Switzerland) Vreni Schneider	(Norway) Julie Lunde Hansen	(Austria) Anita Wachter
672	28	20 March 1991	(United States) Waterville Valley	SL _{214}	(Sweden) Pernilla Wiberg	(Austria) Vreni Schneider	(Austria) Petra Kronberger
673	29	22 March 1991	(United States) Waterville Valley	GS _{186}	(United States) Julie Parisien	(Austria) Ulrike Maier	(Norway) Julie Lunde Hansen
Nations Cup		24 March 1991	(United States) Waterville Valley	PS _{ncr}	(Austria) Anita Wachter	(Austria) Ingrid Salvenmoser	(Switzerland) Chantal Bournissen

== Men ==
=== Overall ===
see complete table

In Men's Overall World Cup all results count. The parallel slalom only counts for the Nationscup (or was a show-event). Marc Girardelli won his fourth Overall World Cup.

Place	Name	Country	Total	DH	SG	GS	SL	KB
1	Marc Girardelli	Luxembourg	242	8	15	84	110	25
2	Alberto Tomba	Italy	222	0	0	152	70	0
3	Rudolf Nierlich	Austria	201	0	0	101	100	0
4	Franz Heinzer	Switzerland	199	159	40	0	0	0
5	Ole Kristian Furuseth	Norway	156	0	10	44	102	0
6	Atle Skårdal	Norway	153	125	28	0	0	0
7	Günther Mader	Austria	117	5	26	35	36	15
8	Paul Accola	Switzerland	114	0	13	22	67	12
9	Lasse Kjus	Norway	103	5	6	30	42	20
10	Thomas Fogdö	Sweden	95	0	0	0	95	0
11	Daniel Mahrer	Switzerland	93	81	12	0	0	0
12	Stephan Eberharter	Austria	88	0	33	35	9	11
13	Thomas Stangassinger	Austria	80	0	0	0	80	0
14	Armin Bittner	Germany	77	0	0	15	62	0
15	Urs Kälin	Switzerland	70	0	6	64	0	0
16	Hannes Zehentner	Germany	68	50	18	0	0	0
17	Kjetil André Aamodt	Norway	67	0	19	32	16	0
18	Franck Piccard	France	66	11	27	28	0	0
19	Michael Tritscher	Austria	65	0	0	1	64	0
20	Helmut Höflehner	Austria	64	64	0	0	0	0
	Rob Boyd	Canada	64	62	0	0	0	2

=== Downhill ===
see complete table

In 1991 all results count.

Place	Name	Country	Total	4 (France)	6 (Italy)	7 (Italy)	12 (Germany)	14 (Austria)	21 (United States)	24 (Canada)	25 (Canada)
1	Franz Heinzer	Switzerland	159	20	25	11	8	25	25	20	25
2	Atle Skårdal	Norway	125	-	15	25	20	-	20	25	20
3	Daniel Mahrer	Switzerland	81	7	11	6	25	10	-	10	12
4	Helmut Höflehner	Austria	64	-	-	-	12	11	15	15	11
5	Rob Boyd	Canada	62	-	9	20	10	15	-	4	4
6	Patrick Ortlieb	Austria	56	11	4	4	-	-	11	11	15
7	Hannes Zehentner	Germany	50	12	10	8	20	-	-	-	-
	Leonhard Stock	Austria	50	25	-	5	-	-	12	8	-
9	William Besse	Switzerland	47	-	6	10	4	-	10	7	10
10	Lasse Arnesen	Norway	44	8	12	12	12	-	-	-	-

=== Super G ===
see complete table

In 1991 all three results count.

Place	Name	Country	Total	3 (France)	13 (Germany)	26 (Canada)
1	Franz Heinzer	Switzerland	40	20	20	-
2	Stephan Eberharter	Austria	33	15	3	15
3	Atle Skårdal	Norway	28	12	7	9
4	Franck Piccard	France	27	25	-	2
5	Günther Mader	Austria	26	1	25	-
6	Markus Wasmeier	Germany	25	-	-	25
7	Patrick Holzer	Italy	20	-	-	20
8	Kjetil André Aamodt	Norway	19	8	11	-
9	Hannes Zehentner	Germany	18	10	4	4
10	Marc Girardelli	Luxembourg	15	-	15	-
	Luc Alphand	France	15	-	9	6

=== Giant Slalom ===
see complete table

In 1991 all results count.

Place	Name	Country	Total	2 (New Zealand)	8 (Italy)	10 (Socialist Federal Republic of Yugoslavia)	17 (Switzerland)	19 (Norway)	22 (United States)	27 (United States)
1	Alberto Tomba	Italy	152	7	25	25	20	25	25	25
2	Rudolf Nierlich	Austria	101	8	11	12	15	20	20	15
3	Marc Girardelli	Luxembourg	84	2	15	15	25	12	15	-
4	Urs Kälin	Switzerland	64	4	20	20	7	8	3	2
5	Fredrik Nyberg	Sweden	52	25	12	10	5	-	-	-
6	Ole Kristian Furuseth	Norway	44	5	-	-	4	7	8	20
7	Stephan Eberharter	Austria	35	-	8	-	-	15	12	-
	Günther Mader	Austria	35	-	10	3	11	-	11	-
9	Johan Wallner	Sweden	34	10	7	-	3	-	2	12
10	Kjetil André Aamodt	Norway	32	9	5	1	8	5	4	-

=== Slalom ===
see complete table

In 1991 all results count.

Place	Name	Country	Total	1 (New Zealand)	5 (Italy)	9 (Italy)	11 (Socialist Federal Republic of Yugoslavia)	15 (Austria)	18 (Norway)	20 (Norway)	23 (United States)	28 (United States)
1	Marc Girardelli	Luxembourg	110	7	12	15	12	25	15	12	12	-
2	Ole Kristian Furuseth	Norway	102	3	20	25	25	20	-	-	9	-
3	Rudolf Nierlich	Austria	100	-	15	-	-	15	25	-	25	20
4	Thomas Fogdö	Sweden	95	-	10	20	20	-	-	-	20	25
5	Thomas Stangassinger	Austria	80	10	-	12	15	8	8	20	7	-
6	Alberto Tomba	Italy	70	15	25	-	-	-	-	-	10	20
7	Paul Accola	Switzerland	67	11	-	2	7	-	20	15	-	12
8	Michael Tritscher	Austria	64	20	-	11	-	-	-	25	8	-
9	Armin Bittner	Germany	62	6	11	-	9	12	10	-	5	9
10	Mats Ericson	Sweden	56	-	-	9	8	10	-	10	11	8
11	Bernhard Gstrein	Austria	48	8	7	10	-	9	5	-	6	3
12	Peter Roth	Germany	46	25	9	-	-	-	-	4	3	5

=== Combined ===
see complete table

In 1991 only one competition was held.

Place	Name	Country	Total	16 (Austria)
1	Marc Girardelli	Luxembourg	25	25
2	Lasse Kjus	Norway	20	20
3	Günther Mader	Austria	15	15
4	Paul Accola	Switzerland	12	12
5	Stephan Eberharter	Austria	11	11
6	Kristian Ghedina	Italy	10	10
7	Peter Runggaldier	Italy	9	9
8	Josef Polig	Italy	8	8
9	Xavier Gigandet	Switzerland	7	7
10	Jan Einar Thorsen	Norway	6	6

== Ladies ==
=== Overall ===
see complete table

In Women's Overall World Cup all results count. The parallel slalom only counts for the Nationscup (or was a show-event).

Place	Name	Country	Total	DH	SG	GS	SL	KB
1	Petra Kronberger	Austria	312	90	70	44	83	25
2	Sabine Ginther	Austria	195	122	28	6	4	35
3	Vreni Schneider	Switzerland	185	0	0	113	72	0
4	Chantal Bournissen	Switzerland	181	140	30	0	0	11
5	Carole Merle	France	176	76	88	12	0	0
6	Anita Wachter	Austria	142	0	23	79	28	12
7	Pernilla Wiberg	Sweden	140	0	0	61	79	0
8	Ingrid Salvenmoser	Austria	103	0	0	28	75	0
9	Michaela Gerg	Germany	94	23	44	6	0	21
10	Blanca Fernández Ochoa	Spain	88	0	0	12	76	0
11	Katrin Gutensohn	Germany	87	72	15	0	0	0
12	Anja Haas	Austria	86	70	0	0	0	16
13	Veronika Wallinger	Austria	84	74	10	0	0	0
14	Eva Twardokens	United States	83	0	2	57	22	2
15	Katja Seizinger	Germany	79	34	33	5	0	7
16	Kerrin Lee	Canada	78	60	18	0	0	0
17	Sylvia Eder	Austria	76	0	26	50	0	0
18	Lucie Laroche	Canada	73	49	24	0	0	0
19	Nataša Bokal	Yugoslavia	71	0	0	43	28	0
20	Karin Dedler	Germany	70	32	33	0	0	5

=== Downhill ===
see complete table

In Women's Downhill World Cup 1990/91 all results count.

Place	Name	Country	Total	3 (Austria)	6 (France)	9 (Austria)	15 (France)	17 (Germany)	20 (Japan)	22 (Canada)	25 (United States)	26 (United States)
1	Chantal Bournissen	Switzerland	140	-	20	15	-	25	20	20	15	25
2	Sabine Ginther	Austria	122	11	8	20	-	8	10	25	25	15
3	Petra Kronberger	Austria	90	20	25	3	25	-	9	8	-	-
4	Carole Merle	France	76	10	11	9	20	20	3	3	-	-
5	Veronika Wallinger	Austria	74	7	5	7	15	15	2	5	7	11
6	Katrin Gutensohn	Germany	72	25	10	25	12	-	-	-	-	-
7	Anja Haas	Austria	70	6	-	1	2	9	25	7	-	20
8	Warwara Zelenskaja	Soviet Union	68	-	15	11	-	10	15	12	5	-
9	Kerrin Lee	Canada	60	15	-	12	1	11	6	11	1	3
10	Lucie Laroche	Canada	49	-	-	-	-	5	7	9	20	8

=== Super G ===
see complete table

In Women's Super G World Cup 1990/91 all results count. Carole Merle won her third Super G World Cup in a row.

Place	Name	Country	Total	4 (Austria)	5 (Switzerland)	16 (France)	18 (Germany)	21 (Japan)
1	Carole Merle	France	88	12	11	15	25	25
2	Petra Kronberger	Austria	70	25	20	25	-	-
3	Michaela Gerg	Germany	44	2	-	20	15	7
4	Karin Dedler	Germany	33	10	-	3	20	-
	Katja Seizinger	Germany	33	-	-	12	11	10
6	Sigrid Wolf	Austria	30	20	10	-	-	-
	Chantal Bournissen	Switzerland	30	1	25	-	4	-
8	Sabine Ginther	Austria	28	-	3	-	10	15
9	Sylvia Eder	Austria	26	6	12	-	-	8
10	Lucie Laroche	Canada	24	-	15	-	-	9

=== Giant Slalom ===
see complete table

In Women's Giant Slalom World Cup 1990/91 all results count. Vreni Schneider won her fourth Giant Slalom World Cup.

Place	Name	Country	Total	1 (Italy)	12 (Socialist Federal Republic of Yugoslavia)	19 (Germany)	23 (Canada)	27 (United States)	29 (United States)
1	Vreni Schneider	Switzerland	113	20	25	15	20	25	8
2	Anita Wachter	Austria	79	11	8	25	11	15	9
3	Pernilla Wiberg	Sweden	61	15	-	-	25	10	11
4	Eva Twardokens	United States	57	-	12	20	8	7	10
5	Julie Lunde Hansen	Norway	50	9	-	6	-	20	15
	Sylvia Eder	Austria	50	-	11	12	15	-	12
7	Petra Kronberger	Austria	44	25	15	-	-	-	4
8	Nataša Bokal	Yugoslavia	43	-	20	10	9	4	-
9	Ulrike Maier	Austria	42	-	7	-	6	9	20
10	Julie Parisien	United States	36	-	-	-	-	11	25

=== Slalom ===
see complete table

In Women's Slalom World Cup 1990/91 all results count.

Place	Name	Country	Total	2 (Italy)	7 (France)	10 (Austria)	13 (Socialist Federal Republic of Yugoslavia)	14 (Socialist Federal Republic of Yugoslavia)	24 (Canada)	28 (United States)
1	Petra Kronberger	Austria	83	25	-	12	6	25	-	15
2	Pernilla Wiberg	Sweden	79	-	20	25	-	9	-	25
3	Blanca Fernández Ochoa	Spain	76	9	25	1	11	11	10	9
4	Ingrid Salvenmoser	Austria	75	20	-	11	4	20	8	12
5	Vreni Schneider	Switzerland	72	-	15	-	12	-	25	20
6	Christine von Grünigen	Switzerland	61	-	10	15	7	12	9	8
7	Veronika Šarec	Yugoslavia	60	4	7	8	15	15	-	11
8	Monika Maierhofer	Austria	59	12	-	20	20	-	-	7
9	Patricia Chauvet	France	50	15	-	8	2	10	12	3
10	Kristina Andersson	Sweden	37	-	8	-	2	7	20	-
	Karin Buder	Austria	37	11	11	-	-	9	-	6
12	Claudia Strobl	Austria	35	6	1	10	8	-	-	10
13	Florence Masnada	France	31	-	12	10	9	-	-	-
14	Nataša Bokal	Yugoslavia	28	-	-	3	25	-	-	-
	Anita Wachter	Austria	28	-	9	-	4	-	15	-
	Katjuša Pušnik	Yugoslavia	28	-	-	-	5	6	12	5

=== Combined ===
see complete table

In Women's Combined World Cup 1990/91 both results count.

Place	Name	Country	Total	8 (France)	11 (Austria)
1	Sabine Ginther	Austria	35	15	20
	Florence Masnada	France	35	20	15
3	Ingrid Stöckl	Austria	34	25	9
4	Petra Kronberger	Austria	25	-	25
5	Michaela Gerg	Germany	21	9	12
6	Stefanie Schuster	Austria	20	10	10
7	Lucia Medzihradská	Czechoslovakia	18	7	11
8	Anja Haas	Austria	16	8	8
9	Anita Wachter	Austria	12	12	-
10	Chantal Bournissen	Switzerland	11	11	-

== Nations Cup ==
=== Overall ===
Place	Country	Total	Men	Ladies
1	Austria	2313	923	1390
2	Switzerland	1233	676	557
3	Germany	752	260	492
4	Norway	676	607	69
5	France	556	155	401
6	Italy	542	522	20
7	Sweden	535	323	212
8	United States	298	42	256
9	Canada	282	92	190
10	Luxembourg	242	242	0
11	Yugoslavia	196	20	176
12	Soviet Union	129	0	129
13	Spain	88	0	88
14	Czechoslovakia	31	0	31
15	Japan	30	29	1

=== Men ===
Place	Country	Total	DH	SG	GS	SL	KB	Racers	Wins
1	Austria	923	224	80	246	347	26	17	5
2	Switzerland	676	335	79	156	84	22	16	5
3	Norway	607	210	91	106	174	26	10	4
4	Italy	522	69	45	193	188	27	17	6
5	Sweden	323	24	13	101	185	0	7	2
6	Germany	260	84	43	15	109	9	7	2
7	Luxembourg	242	8	15	84	110	25	1	3
8	France	155	49	53	34	19	0	8	1
9	Canada	92	85	0	0	5	2	5	0
10	United States	42	29	0	12	0	1	4	0
11	Japan	29	0	0	0	29	0	1	0
12	Yugoslavia	20	0	0	20	0	0	1	0

=== Ladies ===
All points were shown. But without parallel slalom, because result ? (Also possible, that the parallel slalom was only a show-event.)

Place	Country	Total	DH	SG	GS	SL	KB	Racers	Wins
1	Austria	1390	414	213	284	334	156	19	13
2	Switzerland	557	182	68	150	140	17	11	6
3	Germany	492	204	176	52	17	43	12	2
4	France	401	125	118	13	105	40	10	2
5	United States	256	59	47	102	46	2	10	1
6	Sweden	212	0	0	96	116	0	3	3
7	Canada	190	128	57	0	0	5	4	0
8	Yugoslavia	176	2	0	58	116	0	4	1
9	Soviet Union	129	121	8	0	0	0	4	0
10	Spain	88	0	0	12	76	0	1	1
11	Norway	69	0	5	50	14	0	3	0
12	Czechoslovakia	31	10	0	0	0	21	2	0
13	Italy	20	0	0	12	8	0	4	0
14	Japan	1	0	1	0	0	0	1	0
