= 1990 Alpine Skiing World Cup – Men's combined =

1990 Men's combined World Cup
Previous: 1989	Next: 1991

Men's combined World Cup 1989/1990

== Calendar ==
Round	Race No	Discipline	Place	Country	Date	Winner	Second	Third
1	15	Downhill; Slalom	Schladming	Austria	January 11, 1990; January 12, 1990	(Switzerland) Pirmin Zurbriggen	(Switzerland) Paul Accola	(Austria) Günther Mader
2	19	Downhill sprint Slalom	Kitzbühel	Austria	January 20, 1990; January 21, 1990	(Switzerland) Pirmin Zurbriggen	(Switzerland) Paul Accola	(West Germany) Markus Wasmeier

== Final point standings ==
In men's combined World Cup 1989/90 both results count.

Place	Name	Country	Total points	15 (Austria)	19 (Austria)
1	Pirmin Zurbriggen	Switzerland	50	25	25
2	Paul Accola	Switzerland	40	20	20
3	Markus Wasmeier	West Germany	27	12	15
4	Thomas Hangl	Austria	23	11	12
5	Günther Mader	Austria	15	15	-
6	William Besse	Switzerland	14	3	11
7	Kristian Ghedina	Italy	10	10	-
	Franck Piccard	France	10	-	10
9	Peter Runggaldier	Italy	9	9	-
	Peter Wirnsberger II	Austria	9	-	9
11	Urs Kälin	Switzerland	8	8	-
	Bernhard Fahner	Switzerland	8	-	8
	Daniel Mahrer	Switzerland	8	4	4
14	Peter Rzehak	Austria	7	7	-
	Patrick Ortlieb	Austria	7	-	7
	Bill Hudson	United States	7	1	6
17	Xavier Gigandet	Switzerland	6	6	-
18	Lukas Perathoner	Italy	5	5	-
	Mario Summermatter	Switzerland	5	-	5
20	Gustav Oehrli	Switzerland	3	-	3
21	Jeff Olson	United States	2	2	-
	A. J. Kitt	United States	2	-	2
23	Franz Heinzer	Switzerland	1	-	1

== Men's combined team results ==
bold indicate highest score - italics indicate race wins

Place	Country	Total points	15 (Austria)	19 (Austria)	Racers	Wins
1	Switzerland	143	66	**77**	10	2
2	Austria	61	33	28	5	0
3	West Germany	27	12	15	1	0
4	Italy	24	24	-	3	0
5	United States	11	3	8	3	0
6	France	10	-	10	1	0

**Alpine Skiing World Cup**
**Men**

Overall | Downhill | Super G | Giant slalom | Slalom | **Combined**

**1990**
