= 1991 Alpine Skiing World Cup – Men's combined =

1991 Men's combined World Cup
Previous: 1990	Next: 1992

Men's combined World Cup 1990/1991

== Calendar ==
Round	Race No	Discipline	Place	Country	Date	Winner	Second	Third
1	16	Downhill; Slalom	Kitzbühel	Austria	January 12, 1991; January 13, 1991	(Luxembourg) Marc Girardelli	(Norway) Lasse Kjus	(Austria) Günther Mader

== Final point standings ==
In men's combined World Cup 1990/91 only one competition was held.

Place	Name	Country	Total points	16 (Austria)
1	Marc Girardelli	Luxembourg	25	25
2	Lasse Kjus	Norway	20	20
3	Günther Mader	Austria	15	15
4	Paul Accola	Switzerland	12	12
5	Stephan Eberharter	Austria	11	11
6	Kristian Ghedina	Italy	10	10
7	Peter Runggaldier	Italy	9	9
8	Josef Polig	Italy	8	8
9	Xavier Gigandet	Switzerland	7	7
10	Jan Einar Thorsen	Norway	6	6
11	Markus Wasmeier	Germany	5	5
12	Hans-Jörg Tauscher	Germany	4	4
13	William Besse	Switzerland	3	3
14	Rob Boyd	Canada	2	2
15	A. J. Kitt	United States	1	1

== Men's combined team results ==
bold indicate highest score - italics indicate race wins

Place	Country	Total points	16 (Austria)	Racers	Wins
1	Italy	27	**27**	3	0
2	Austria	26	26	2	0
	Norway	26	26	2	0
4	Luxembourg	25	25	1	1
5	Switzerland	22	22	3	0
6	Germany	9	9	2	0
7	Canada	2	2	1	0
8	United States	1	1	1	0

**Alpine Skiing World Cup**
**Men**

Overall | Downhill | Super G | Giant slalom | Slalom | **Combined**

**1991**
