= Julie Hansen =

Julie Hansen may refer to:

- Julie Vinter Hansen (1890–1960), Danish astronomer
- Julie Lunde Hansen (born 1972), Norwegian alpine skier
- Julie Hjorth-Hansen (born 1984), Danish swimmer

== See also ==
- Julia Butler Hansen (1907–1988), member of the U.S. House of Representatives from Washington
