= Lucie LaRoche =

Canadian alpine skier (born 1968)

Personal information
- Born: 23 October 1968 (age 57) Québec City, Québec, Canada
- Height: 157 cm (5 ft 2 in)
- Weight: 56 kg (123 lb)

Sport
- Sport: Skiing
Medal record
Women's alpine skiing
Representing Canada
Winter Pan American Games
Silver medal – second place	1990 Las Leñas	Slalom Downhill

Lucie LaRoche (born 23 October 1968) is a Canadian former alpine skier. She competed in the 1988 Winter Olympics and in the 1992 Winter Olympics. Lucie joined the Canadian National Ski Team in 1968, and was named Ski Quebec Alpin's athlete of the year in 1986.

Lucie is the youngest of seven children of the architect Guy Laroche and his wife Suzanne. She grew up in a house at the foot of Mont St-Castin in the immediate vicinity of the ski resort of the same name in Lac-Beauport. Her older brothers, Yves, Dominique LaRoche, Alain LaRoche, and Philippe LaRoche were also active as freestyle skiers.
