= List of FIS Alpine Ski World Cup men's champions =

This is a complete list of men's alpine skiing World Cup champions in the overall and each discipline.

== History ==
Multiple World Cups in the overall and in each discipline are marked with (#). Combined events (calculated using results from selected downhill and slalom races) were included starting with the 1974–75 season, but a discipline trophy was only awarded during the next season (1975–76) and then once again starting with the 1979–80 season. Prior to the 2006–7 season, no trophy had been officially awarded for the combined since the late 1980s. The table below lists the leader of the combined standings each season even if no trophy was awarded. The Super-G was added for the 1982–83 season, but from 1983 to 1985, Super-G results were included with giant slalom, and a single trophy was awarded for giant slalom.

== Overall podium ==
Name	Career			
Name	Career	1st	2nd	3rd
(Austria) Marcel Hirscher	2007–2019	8	–	–
(Luxembourg) Marc Girardelli	1980–1996	5	2	2
(Switzerland) Marco Odermatt	2016–2026	5	1	–
(Switzerland) Pirmin Zurbriggen	1981–1990	4	3	–
(Italy) Gustav Thöni	1969–1980	4	1	2
(Austria) Hermann Maier	1996–2009	4	–	2
(United States) Phil Mahre	1975–1984	3	1	2
(Sweden) Ingemar Stenmark	1973–1989	3	6	–

Season	1st	2nd	3rd
1967	(France) Jean-Claude Killy	(Austria) Heini Messner	(France) Guy Périllat
1968	(France) Jean-Claude Killy (2)	(Switzerland) Dumeng Giovanoli	(Austria) Herbert Huber
1968-69	(Austria) Karl Schranz	(France) Jean-Noël Augert	(Austria) Reinhard Tritscher
1969-70	(Austria) Karl Schranz (2)	(France) Patrick Russel	(Italy) Gustav Thöni
1970-71	(Italy) Gustav Thöni	(France) Henri Duvillard	(France) Patrick Russel
1971-72	(Italy) Gustav Thöni (2)	(France) Henri Duvillard (2)	(Switzerland) Edmund Bruggmann
1972-73	(Italy) Gustav Thöni (3)	(Austria) David Zwilling	(Switzerland) Roland Collombin
1973-74	(Italy) Piero Gros	(Italy) Gustav Thöni	(Austria) Hansi Hinterseer
1974-75	(Italy) Gustav Thöni (4)	(Sweden) Ingemar Stenmark	(Austria) Franz Klammer
1975-76	(Sweden) Ingemar Stenmark	(Italy) Piero Gros	(Italy) Gustav Thöni (2)
1976-77	(Sweden) Ingemar Stenmark (2)	(Austria) Klaus Heidegger	(Austria) Franz Klammer (2)
1977-78	(Sweden) Ingemar Stenmark (3)	(United States) Phil Mahre	(Liechtenstein) Andreas Wenzel
1978-79	(Switzerland) Peter Lüscher	(Austria) Leonhard Stock	(United States) Phil Mahre
1979-80	(Liechtenstein) Andreas Wenzel	(Sweden) Ingemar Stenmark (2)	(United States) Phil Mahre (2)
1980-81	(United States) Phil Mahre	(Sweden) Ingemar Stenmark (3)	(Soviet Union) Alexander Schirow
1981-82	(United States) Phil Mahre (2)	(Sweden) Ingemar Stenmark (4)	(United States) Steve Mahre
1982-83	(United States) Phil Mahre (3)	(Sweden) Ingemar Stenmark (5)	(Liechtenstein) Andreas Wenzel (2)
1983-84	(Switzerland) Pirmin Zurbriggen	(Sweden) Ingemar Stenmark (6)	(Luxembourg) Marc Girardelli
1984-85	(Luxembourg) Marc Girardelli	(Switzerland) Pirmin Zurbriggen	(Liechtenstein) Andreas Wenzel (3)
1985-86	(Luxembourg) Marc Girardelli (2)	(Switzerland) Pirmin Zurbriggen (2)	(West Germany) Markus Wasmeier
1986-87	(Switzerland) Pirmin Zurbriggen (2)	(Luxembourg) Marc Girardelli	(West Germany) Markus Wasmeier (2)
1987-88	(Switzerland) Pirmin Zurbriggen (3)	(Italy) Alberto Tomba	(Austria) Hubert Strolz
1988-89	(Luxembourg) Marc Girardelli (3)	(Switzerland) Pirmin Zurbriggen (3)	(Italy) Alberto Tomba
1989-90	(Switzerland) Pirmin Zurbriggen (4)	(Norway) Ole Kristian Furuseth	(Austria) Günther Mader
1990-91	(Luxembourg) Marc Girardelli (4)	(Italy) Alberto Tomba (2)	(Austria) Rudolf Nierlich
1991-92	(Switzerland) Paul Accola	(Italy) Alberto Tomba (3)	(Luxembourg) Marc Girardelli (2)
1992-93	(Luxembourg) Marc Girardelli (5)	(Norway) Kjetil André Aamodt	(Switzerland) Franz Heinzer
1993-94	(Norway) Kjetil André Aamodt	(Luxembourg) Marc Girardelli (2)	(Italy) Alberto Tomba (2)
1994-95	(Italy) Alberto Tomba	(Austria) Günther Mader	(Slovenia) Jure Košir
1995-96	(Norway) Lasse Kjus	(Austria) Günther Mader (2)	(Switzerland) Michael von Grünigen
1996-97	(France) Luc Alphand	(Norway) Kjetil André Aamodt (2)	(Austria) Josef Strobl
1997-98	(Austria) Hermann Maier	(Austria) Andreas Schifferer	(Austria) Stephan Eberharter
1998-99	(Norway) Lasse Kjus (2)	(Norway) Kjetil André Aamodt (3)	(Austria) Hermann Maier
1999-00	(Austria) Hermann Maier (2)	(Norway) Kjetil André Aamodt (4)	(Austria) Josef Strobl (2)
2000-01	(Austria) Hermann Maier (3)	(Austria) Stephan Eberharter	(Norway) Lasse Kjus
2001-02	(Austria) Stephan Eberharter	(Norway) Kjetil André Aamodt (5)	(Switzerland) Didier Cuche
2002-03	(Austria) Stephan Eberharter (2)	(United States) Bode Miller	(Norway) Kjetil André Aamodt
2003-04	(Austria) Hermann Maier (4)	(Austria) Stephan Eberharter (2)	(Austria) Benjamin Raich
2004-05	(United States) Bode Miller	(Austria) Benjamin Raich	(Austria) Hermann Maier (2)
2005-06	(Austria) Benjamin Raich	(Norway) Aksel Lund Svindal	(United States) Bode Miller
2006-07	(Norway) Aksel Lund Svindal	(Austria) Benjamin Raich (2)	(Switzerland) Didier Cuche (2)
2007-08	(United States) Bode Miller (2)	(Austria) Benjamin Raich (3)	(Switzerland) Didier Cuche (3)
2008-09	(Norway) Aksel Lund Svindal (2)	(Austria) Benjamin Raich (4)	(Switzerland) Didier Cuche (4)
2009-10	(Switzerland) Carlo Janka	(Austria) Benjamin Raich (5)	(Switzerland) Didier Cuche (5)
2010-11	(Croatia) Ivica Kostelić	(Switzerland) Didier Cuche	(Switzerland) Carlo Janka
2011-12	(Austria) Marcel Hirscher	(Switzerland) Beat Feuz	(Norway) Aksel Lund Svindal
2012-13	(Austria) Marcel Hirscher (2)	(Norway) Aksel Lund Svindal (2)	(United States) Ted Ligety
2013-14	(Austria) Marcel Hirscher (3)	(Norway) Aksel Lund Svindal (3)	(France) Alexis Pinturault
2014-15	(Austria) Marcel Hirscher (4)	(Norway) Kjetil Jansrud	(France) Alexis Pinturault (2)
2015-16	(Austria) Marcel Hirscher (5)	(Norway) Henrik Kristoffersen	(France) Alexis Pinturault (3)
2016-17	(Austria) Marcel Hirscher (6)	(Norway) Kjetil Jansrud (2)	(Norway) Henrik Kristoffersen
2017-18	(Austria) Marcel Hirscher (7)	(Norway) Henrik Kristoffersen (2)	(Norway) Aksel Lund Svindal (2)
2018-19	(Austria) Marcel Hirscher (8)	(France) Alexis Pinturault	(Norway) Henrik Kristoffersen (2)
2019-20	(Norway) Aleksander Aamodt Kilde	(France) Alexis Pinturault (2)	(Norway) Henrik Kristoffersen (3)
2020-21	(France) Alexis Pinturault	(Switzerland) Marco Odermatt	(Austria) Marco Schwarz
2021-22	(Switzerland) Marco Odermatt	(Norway) Aleksander Aamodt Kilde	(Norway) Henrik Kristoffersen (4)
2022-23	(Switzerland) Marco Odermatt (2)	(Norway) Aleksander Aamodt Kilde (2)	(Norway) Henrik Kristoffersen (5)
2023-24	(Switzerland) Marco Odermatt (3)	(Switzerland) Loic Meillard	(Austria) Manuel Feller
2024-25	(Switzerland) Marco Odermatt (4)	(Norway) Henrik Kristoffersen (3)	(Switzerland) Loic Meillard
2025-26	(Switzerland) Marco Odermatt (5)	(Brazil) Lucas Pinheiro Braathen	(Norway) Atle Lie McGrath

== Winners by discipline ==
Discipline	Skier	Titles
Downhill	(Austria) Franz Klammer	5
Super-G	(Austria) Hermann Maier	5
Super-G	(Norway) Aksel Lund Svindal	5
Giant slalom	(Sweden) Ingemar Stenmark	8
Slalom	(Sweden) Ingemar Stenmark	8
Combined	(France) Alexis Pinturault	6
Parallel	(Switzerland) Loic Meillard	1
Parallel	(France) Alexis Pinturault	1
Parallel	(Austria) Christian Hirschbühl	1

Won all discipline races in a season

Year	Overall	Slalom	Giant slalom	Downhill	Super-G	Combined	Parallel
2026	(Switzerland) Marco Odermatt (5)	(Norway) Atle Lie McGrath	(Brazil) Lucas Pinheiro Braathen	(Switzerland) Marco Odermatt (3)	(Switzerland) Marco Odermatt (4)		
2025	(Switzerland) Marco Odermatt (4)	(Norway) Henrik Kristoffersen (4)	(Switzerland) Marco Odermatt (4)	(Switzerland) Marco Odermatt (2)	(Switzerland) Marco Odermatt (3)		
2024	(Switzerland) Marco Odermatt (3)	(Austria) Manuel Feller	(Switzerland) Marco Odermatt (3)	(Switzerland) Marco Odermatt	(Switzerland) Marco Odermatt (2)		
2023	(Switzerland) Marco Odermatt (2)	(Norway) Lucas Braathen	(Switzerland) Marco Odermatt (2)	(Norway) Aleksander Aamodt Kilde (2)	(Switzerland) Marco Odermatt		
2022	(Switzerland) Marco Odermatt	(Norway) Henrik Kristoffersen (3)	(Switzerland) Marco Odermatt	(Norway) Aleksander Aamodt Kilde	(Norway) Aleksander Aamodt Kilde (2)		(Austria) Christian Hirschbühl
2021	(France) Alexis Pinturault	(Austria) Marco Schwarz	(France) Alexis Pinturault	(Switzerland) Beat Feuz (4)	(Austria) Vincent Kriechmayr		(France) Alexis Pinturault
2020	(Norway) Aleksander Aamodt Kilde	(Norway) Henrik Kristoffersen (2)	(Norway) Henrik Kristoffersen	(Switzerland) Beat Feuz (3)	(Switzerland) Mauro Caviezel	(France) Alexis Pinturault (6)	(Switzerland) Loïc Meillard
2019	(Austria) Marcel Hirscher (8)	(Austria) Marcel Hirscher (6)	(Austria) Marcel Hirscher (6)	(Switzerland) Beat Feuz (2)	(Italy) Dominik Paris	(France) Alexis Pinturault (5)	
2018	(Austria) Marcel Hirscher (7)	(Austria) Marcel Hirscher (5)	(Austria) Marcel Hirscher (5)	(Switzerland) Beat Feuz	(Norway) Kjetil Jansrud (3)	(Italy) Peter Fill	
2017	(Austria) Marcel Hirscher (6)	(Austria) Marcel Hirscher (4)	(Austria) Marcel Hirscher (4)	(Italy) Peter Fill (2)	(Norway) Kjetil Jansrud (2)	(France) Alexis Pinturault (4)	
2016	(Austria) Marcel Hirscher (5)	(Norway) Henrik Kristoffersen	(Austria) Marcel Hirscher (3)	(Italy) Peter Fill	(Norway) Aleksander Aamodt Kilde	(France) Alexis Pinturault (3)	
2015	(Austria) Marcel Hirscher (4)	(Austria) Marcel Hirscher (3)	(Austria) Marcel Hirscher (2)	(Norway) Kjetil Jansrud	(Norway) Kjetil Jansrud	(Switzerland) Carlo Janka (2)	
2014	(Austria) Marcel Hirscher (3)	(Austria) Marcel Hirscher (2)	(United States) Ted Ligety (5)	(Norway) Aksel Lund Svindal (2)	(Norway) Aksel Lund Svindal (5)	(United States) Ted Ligety (France) Alexis Pinturault (2)	
2013	(Austria) Marcel Hirscher (2)	(Austria) Marcel Hirscher	(United States) Ted Ligety (4)	(Norway) Aksel Lund Svindal	(Norway) Aksel Lund Svindal (4)	(Croatia) Ivica Kostelić (3) (France) Alexis Pinturault	
2012	(Austria) Marcel Hirscher	(Sweden) André Myhrer	(Austria) Marcel Hirscher	(Austria) Klaus Kröll	(Norway) Aksel Lund Svindal (3)	(Croatia) Ivica Kostelić (2)	
2011	(Croatia) Ivica Kostelić	(Croatia) Ivica Kostelić (2)	(United States) Ted Ligety (3)	(Switzerland) Didier Cuche (4)	(Switzerland) Didier Cuche	(Croatia) Ivica Kostelić	
2010	(Switzerland) Carlo Janka	(Austria) Reinfried Herbst	(United States) Ted Ligety (2)	(Switzerland) Didier Cuche (3)	(Canada) Erik Guay	(Austria) Benjamin Raich (3)	
2009	(Norway) Aksel Lund Svindal (2)	(France) Jean-Baptiste Grange	(Switzerland) Didier Cuche	(Austria) Michael Walchhofer (3)	(Norway) Aksel Lund Svindal (2)	(Switzerland) Carlo Janka	
2008	(United States) Bode Miller (2)	(Italy) Manfred Mölgg	(United States) Ted Ligety	(Switzerland) Didier Cuche (2)	(Austria) Hannes Reichelt	(United States) Bode Miller (3)	
2007	(Norway) Aksel Lund Svindal	(Austria) Benjamin Raich (3)	(Norway) Aksel Lund Svindal	(Switzerland) Didier Cuche	(United States) Bode Miller (2)	(Norway) Aksel Lund Svindal	
2006	(Austria) Benjamin Raich	(Italy) Giorgio Rocca	(Austria) Benjamin Raich (2)	(Austria) Michael Walchhofer (2)	(Norway) Aksel Lund Svindal	(Austria) Benjamin Raich (2)	
2005	(United States) Bode Miller	(Austria) Benjamin Raich (2)	(Austria) Benjamin Raich	(Austria) Michael Walchhofer	(United States) Bode Miller	(Austria) Benjamin Raich	
2004	(Austria) Hermann Maier (4)	(Austria) Rainer Schönfelder	(United States) Bode Miller	(Austria) Stephan Eberharter (3)	(Austria) Hermann Maier (5)	(United States) Bode Miller (2)	
2003	(Austria) Stephan Eberharter (2)	(Finland) Kalle Palander	(Switzerland) Michael von Grünigen (4)	(Austria) Stephan Eberharter (2)	(Austria) Stephan Eberharter (2)	(United States) Bode Miller	
2002	(Austria) Stephan Eberharter	(Croatia) Ivica Kostelić	(France) Frédéric Covili	(Austria) Stephan Eberharter	(Austria) Stephan Eberharter	(Norway) Kjetil André Aamodt (5)	
2001	(Austria) Hermann Maier (3)	(Austria) Benjamin Raich	(Austria) Hermann Maier (3)	(Austria) Hermann Maier (2)	(Austria) Hermann Maier (4)	(Norway) Lasse Kjus (3)	
2000	(Austria) Hermann Maier (2)	(Norway) Kjetil André Aamodt	(Austria) Hermann Maier (2)	(Austria) Hermann Maier	(Austria) Hermann Maier (3)	(Norway) Kjetil André Aamodt (4)	
1999	(Norway) Lasse Kjus (2)	(Austria) Thomas Stangassinger	(Switzerland) Michael von Grünigen (3)	(Norway) Lasse Kjus	(Austria) Hermann Maier (2)	(Norway) Lasse Kjus (2) (Norway) Kjetil André Aamodt (3)	
1998	(Austria) Hermann Maier	(Austria) Thomas Sykora (2)	(Austria) Hermann Maier	(Austria) Andreas Schifferer	(Austria) Hermann Maier	(Austria) Werner Franz	
1997	(France) Luc Alphand	(Austria) Thomas Sykora	(Switzerland) Michael von Grünigen (2)	(France) Luc Alphand (3)	(France) Luc Alphand	(Norway) Kjetil André Aamodt (2)	
1996	(Norway) Lasse Kjus	(France) Sébastien Amiez	(Switzerland) Michael von Grünigen	(France) Luc Alphand (2)	(Norway) Atle Skårdal	(Austria) Günther Mader	
1995	(Italy) Alberto Tomba	(Italy) Alberto Tomba (4)	(Italy) Alberto Tomba (4)	(France) Luc Alphand	(Italy) Peter Runggaldier	(Luxembourg) Marc Girardelli (4)	
1994	(Norway) Kjetil André Aamodt	(Italy) Alberto Tomba (3)	(Austria) Christian Mayer	(Luxembourg) Marc Girardelli (2)	(Norway) Jan Einar Thorsen	(Norway) Lasse Kjus (Norway) Kjetil André Aamodt	
1993	(Luxembourg) Marc Girardelli (5)	(Sweden) Thomas Fogdö	(Norway) Kjetil André Aamodt	(Switzerland) Franz Heinzer (3)	(Norway) Kjetil André Aamodt	(Luxembourg) Marc Girardelli (3)	
1992	(Switzerland) Paul Accola	(Italy) Alberto Tomba (2)	(Italy) Alberto Tomba (3)	(Switzerland) Franz Heinzer (2)	(Switzerland) Paul Accola	(Switzerland) Paul Accola	
1991	(Luxembourg) Marc Girardelli (4)	(Luxembourg) Marc Girardelli (3)	(Italy) Alberto Tomba (2)	(Switzerland) Franz Heinzer	(Switzerland) Franz Heinzer	(Luxembourg) Marc Girardelli (2)	
1990	(Switzerland) Pirmin Zurbriggen (4)	(West Germany) Armin Bittner (2)	(Austria) Günther Mader^{[A]} (Norway) Ole Kristian Furuseth (2)^{[A]}	(Austria) Helmut Höflehner (2)	(Switzerland) Pirmin Zurbriggen (4)	(Switzerland) Pirmin Zurbriggen (3)	
1989	(Luxembourg) Marc Girardelli (3)	(West Germany) Armin Bittner	(Norway) Ole Kristian Furuseth^{[A]} (Switzerland) Pirmin Zurbriggen (3)^{[A]}	(Luxembourg) Marc Girardelli	(Switzerland) Pirmin Zurbriggen (3)	(Luxembourg) Marc Girardelli	
1988	(Switzerland) Pirmin Zurbriggen (3)	(Italy) Alberto Tomba	(Italy) Alberto Tomba	(Switzerland) Pirmin Zurbriggen (2)	(Switzerland) Pirmin Zurbriggen (2)	(Austria) Hubert Strolz	
1987	(Switzerland) Pirmin Zurbriggen (2)	(Socialist Federal Republic of Yugoslavia) Bojan Križaj	(Switzerland) Pirmin Zurbriggen^{[A]} (2) (Switzerland) Joël Gaspoz (2)^{[A]}	(Switzerland) Pirmin Zurbriggen	(Switzerland) Pirmin Zurbriggen	(Switzerland) Pirmin Zurbriggen (2)	
1986	(Luxembourg) Marc Girardelli (2)	(Socialist Federal Republic of Yugoslavia) Rok Petrović	(Switzerland) Joël Gaspoz	(Austria) Peter Wirnsberger	(West Germany) Markus Wasmeier	(Switzerland) Pirmin Zurbriggen	
1985	(Luxembourg) Marc Girardelli	(Luxembourg) Marc Girardelli (2)	(Luxembourg) Marc Girardelli	(Austria) Helmut Höflehner		(Liechtenstein) Andreas Wenzel (3)	
1984	(Switzerland) Pirmin Zurbriggen	(Luxembourg) Marc Girardelli	(Sweden) Ingemar Stenmark^{[A]} (8) (Switzerland) Pirmin Zurbriggen^{[A]}	(Switzerland) Urs Räber		(Liechtenstein) Andreas Wenzel (2)	
1983	(United States) Phil Mahre (3)	(Sweden) Ingemar Stenmark (8)^{[A]} (Sweden) Stig Strand^{[A]}	(United States) Phil Mahre (2)	(Austria) Franz Klammer (5)		(United States) Phil Mahre (4)	
1982	(United States) Phil Mahre (2)	(United States) Phil Mahre	(United States) Phil Mahre	(Canada) Steve Podborski^{[A]} (Switzerland) Peter Müller (3)^{[A]}		(United States) Phil Mahre (3)	
1981	(United States) Phil Mahre	(Sweden) Ingemar Stenmark (7)	(Sweden) Ingemar Stenmark (7)	(Austria) Harti Weirather		(United States) Phil Mahre (2)	
1980	(Liechtenstein) Andreas Wenzel	(Sweden) Ingemar Stenmark (6)	(Sweden) Ingemar Stenmark (6)	(Switzerland) Peter Müller (2)		(United States) Phil Mahre	
1979	(Switzerland) Peter Lüscher	(Sweden) Ingemar Stenmark (5)	(Sweden) Ingemar Stenmark (5)	(Switzerland) Peter Müller		not awarded	
1978	(Sweden) Ingemar Stenmark (3)	(Sweden) Ingemar Stenmark (4)	(Sweden) Ingemar Stenmark (4)	(Austria) Franz Klammer (4)			
1977	(Sweden) Ingemar Stenmark (2)	(Sweden) Ingemar Stenmark (3)	(Switzerland) Heini Hemmi^{[A]} (Sweden) Ingemar Stenmark (3)^{[A]}	(Austria) Franz Klammer (3)		not awarded	
1976	(Sweden) Ingemar Stenmark	(Sweden) Ingemar Stenmark (2)	(Sweden) Ingemar Stenmark (2)	(Austria) Franz Klammer (2)		(Switzerland) Walter Tresch	
1975	(Italy) Gustav Thöni (4)	(Sweden) Ingemar Stenmark	(Sweden) Ingemar Stenmark	(Austria) Franz Klammer		not awarded	
1974	(Italy) Piero Gros	(Italy) Gustav Thöni (2)	(Italy) Piero Gros	(Switzerland) Roland Collombin (2)			
1973	(Italy) Gustav Thöni (3)	(Italy) Gustav Thöni	(Austria) Hansi Hinterseer	(Switzerland) Roland Collombin			
1972	(Italy) Gustav Thöni (2)	(France) Jean-Noël Augert (3)	(Italy) Gustav Thöni (3)	(Switzerland) Bernhard Russi (2)			
1971	(Italy) Gustav Thöni	(France) Jean-Noël Augert (2)	(Italy) Gustav Thöni (2) (France) Patrick Russel	(Switzerland) Bernhard Russi			
1970	(Austria) Karl Schranz (2)	(France) Patrick Russel (2) (France) Alain Penz (2)	(Italy) Gustav Thöni	(Austria) Karl Schranz (2) (Austria) Karl Cordin			
1969	(Austria) Karl Schranz	(France) Patrick Russel (Austria) Alfred Matt (France) Alain Penz (France) Jean-Noël Augert	(Austria) Karl Schranz	(Austria) Karl Schranz			
1968	(France) Jean-Claude Killy (2)	(Switzerland) Dumeng Giovanoli	(France) Jean-Claude Killy (2)	(Austria) Gerhard Nenning			
1967	(France) Jean-Claude Killy	(France) Jean-Claude Killy	(France) Jean-Claude Killy	(France) Jean-Claude Killy			

== See also ==
- List of FIS Alpine Ski World Cup women's champions
- List of alpine skiing world champions
- List of men's downhill races in the FIS Alpine Ski World Cup

== Notes ==
- A ^{a} The skiers were tied on points that season. Although the official FIS website states that both skiers are first in the standings, some sources claim that only one skier is first while the other one is second.
