= Julie Lunde Hansen =

Norwegian alpine skier

Personal information
- Born: 19 March 1972 (age 54) Oslo, Norway

Skiing career
- Sport: Alpine skiing
- Retired: 1995
- Disciplines: Technical events
- World Cup debut: 1989

World Cup
- Seasons: 6
- Podiums: 3
Medal record
Women's alpine skiing
Representing Norway
World Cup race podiums
Event	1st	2nd	3rd
Giant slalom	0	2	1
International competitions
Event	1st	2nd	3rd
World Junior Championships	1	0	0

Julie Lunde Hansen (born 19 March 1972) is a Norwegian former alpine skier.

== Career ==
During her career she has achieved 3 results among the top 3 in the World Cup.

== World Cup results ==
Top 3

Date	Place	Discipline	Rank
22-03-1991	(United States) Waterville Valley	Giant slalom	3
03-03-1991	(United States) Vail	Giant slalom	2
14-03-1990	(Sweden) Klövsjö	Giant slalom	2
