= Lukas Perathoner =

Italian alpine skier (born 1968)

Personal information
- Born: 25 April 1968 (age 58) Bruneck, Italy

Skiing career
- Sport: Alpine skiing
- Retired: 1992
- Disciplines: Speed events
- World Cup debut: 1990

World Cup
- Seasons: 3

Lukas Perathoner (born 25 April 1968) is an Italian former alpine skier.

Although he is also from South Tyrol, he is not a relative of the other Italian skier Werner Perathoner.

== World Cup results ==
Top 15

Date	Place	Discipline	Position
26/01/1992	(Switzerland) Wengen	Combined	21
19/01/1992	(Austria) Kitzbuehel	Combined	14
12/01/1991	(Austria) Kitzbuehel	Downhill	12
12/01/1990	(Austria) Schladming	Combined	11
