= Thomas Fogdö =

Swedish alpine skier

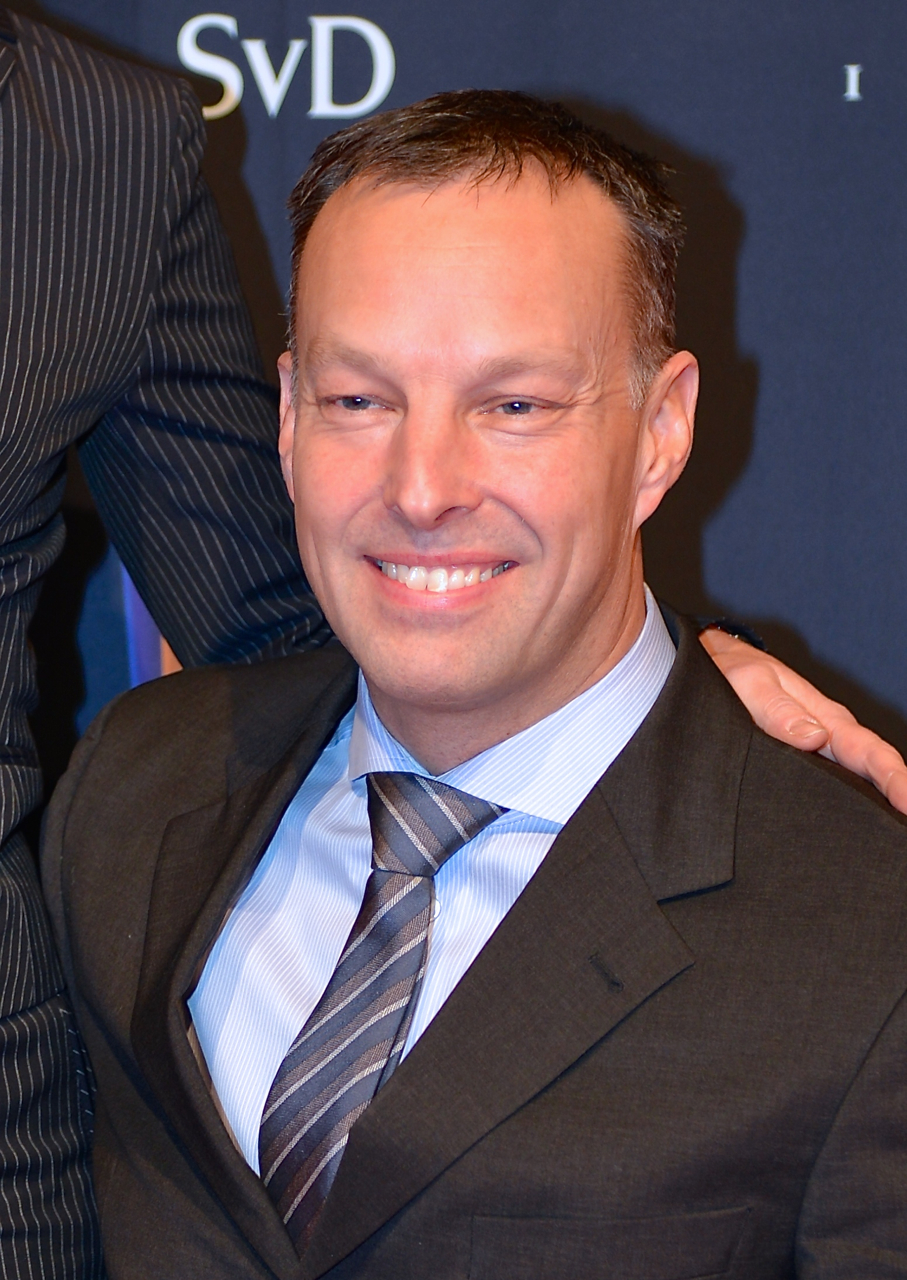
- Thomas Fogdö at the Swedish Sports Awards ceremony in January 2014

Personal information
- Nationality: Sweden
- Born: 14 March 1970 (age 56) Gällivare, Sweden

Sport
- Sport: Skiing

Hans Thomas Fogdö (born 14 March 1970) is a Swedish former alpine skier.

A slalom specialist, he won the World Cup for that discipline in 1993.

On 7 February 1995, a training accident at Åre, Sweden, in which he broke his spine left him disabled. Today, he works for various sponsor projects and for the Swedish Ski Association.

== World Cup victories ==
Date	Location	Race
23 March 1991	Waterville Valley	Slalom
6 December 1992	Val-d'Isère	Slalom
19 December 1992	Kranjska Gora	Slalom
17 January 1993	Lech am Arlberg	Slalom
28 March 1993	Åre	Slalom
