= Lasse Arnesen =

Norwegian alpine skier (born 1965)

Personal information
- Born: 18 January 1965 (age 61) Oslo, Norway
- Height: 175 cm (5 ft 9 in)
- Weight: 82 kg (181 lb)

Sport
- Country: Norway
- Sport: Alpine skiing
- Club: IL Heming

Lasse Arnesen (born 18 January 1965) is a Norwegian alpine skier. He was born in Oslo, and represented the club IL Heming. He competed at the 1992 Winter Olympics in Albertville. From the 1. November 2014, he is the secretary general of the Norwegian Orienteering Federation, succeeding Bjørnar Valstad.
