= Rob Boyd (alpine skier) =

Canadian alpine skier (born 1966)

Personal information
- Full name: Robert Alexander Boyd
- Born: 15 February 1966 (age 60) Vernon, British Columbia, Canada
- Height: 185 cm (6 ft 1 in)
- Weight: 84 kg (185 lb)

Sport
- Sport: Skiing
- Club: Whistler Mountain Ski Club
Medal record
Men's alpine skiing
Representing Canada
Winter Pan American Games
Silver medal – second place	1990 Las Leñas	Slalom Downhill

Robert Alexander Boyd (born 15 February 1966) is a Canadian former alpine skier who competed in the 1988 Winter Olympics. Boyd has coached at the World Cup level and for the Whistler Mountain Ski Club. In 1989 he became the first Canadian alpine skier to win a World Cup downhill race on home soil.
