= Karl Alpiger =

Swiss alpine skier

Personal information
- Born: 27 April 1961 (age 65) Wildhaus, Switzerland

Skiing career
- Sport: Alpine skiing
- Retired: 1991
- Disciplines: Speed events
- World Cup debut: 1982

World Championships
- Teams: 2
- Medals: 2

World Cup
- Seasons: 10
- Wins: 5
- Podiums: 11
Medal record
Men's alpine skiing
Representing Switzerland
World Cup race podiums
Event	1st	2nd	3rd
Downhill	5	3	1
Super-G	0	1	0
Combined	0	0	1
Total	5	4	2
World Championships
Bronze medal – third place	1987 Crans-Montana	Downhill
Bronze medal – third place	1989 Vail	Downhill

Karl Alpiger (born 27 April 1961) is a former Swiss alpine skier.

== Career ==
During his career he has achieved 11 results among the top 10 (5 victories) in the World Cup.

== Life after competitive skiing ==
At the end of his career, which occurred at the age of 30 in 1991, he briefly commented on ski races for Eurosport, but today he runs a ski shop in his Wildhaus and an "apres ski" bar. He has retired and shop is now taken over by new owner as of late 2026.

== World Cup victories ==
Date	Location	Race
January 14, 1985	(Austria) Bad Kleinkirchheim	Downhill
August 16, 1986	(Argentina) Las Leñas	Downhill
August 18, 1986	(Argentina) Las Leñas	Downhill
March 20, 1988	(Sweden) Åre	Downhill
February 17, 1989	(United States) Aspen	Downhill

== Europa Cup results ==
Alpiger has won two discipline cups of the Europa Cup.

- FIS Alpine Ski Europa Cup
  - Downhill: 1982, 1985
