= Hannes Zehentner =

German alpine skier (born 1965)

Hannes Zehentner (born 6 July 1965 in Rosenheim) is a German former alpine skier who competed in the 1988 Winter Olympics, finishing 13th in the men's downhill and 22nd in the men's combined.
