= Atle Skårdal =

Norwegian alpine skier

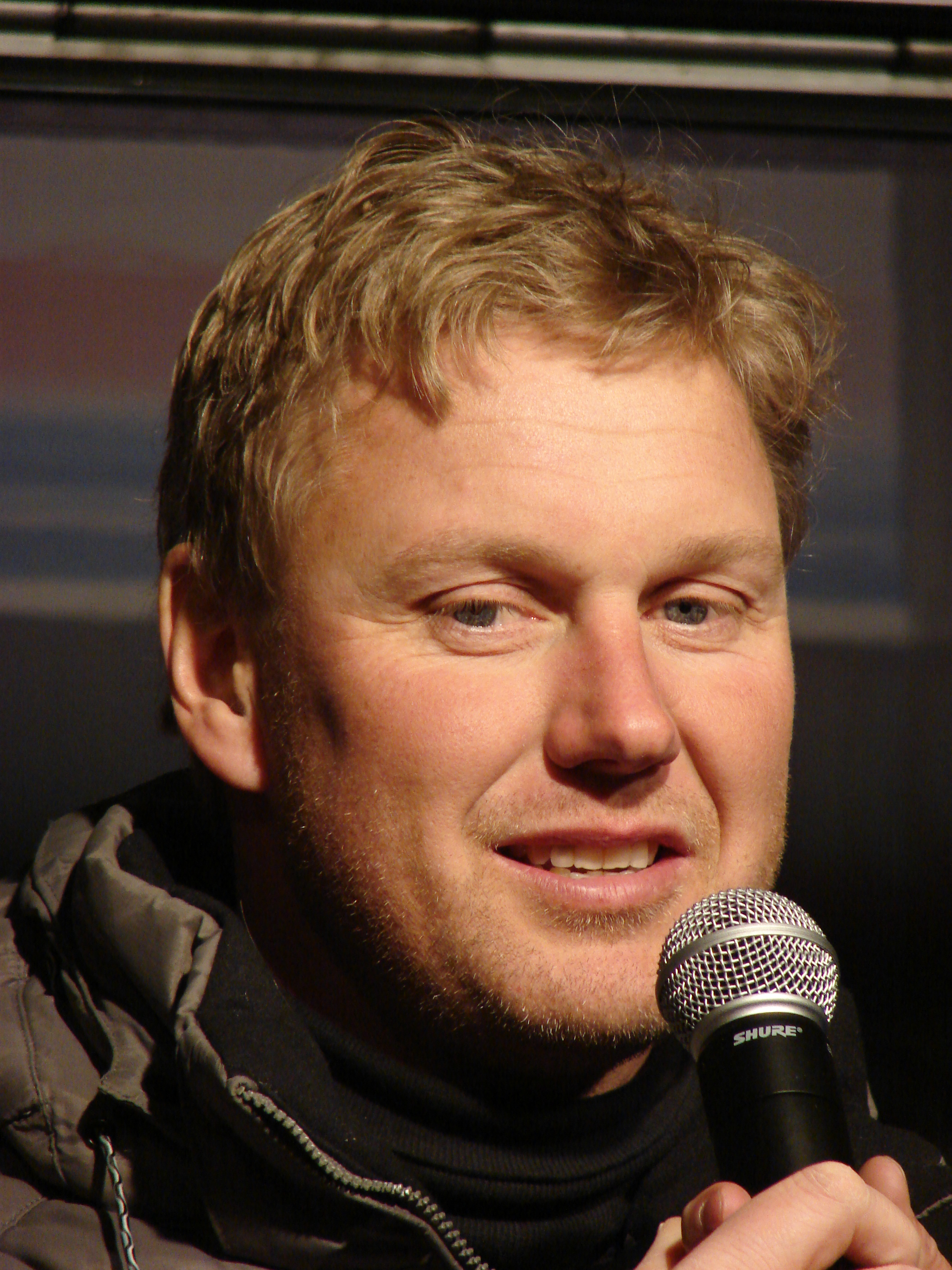
- Skårdal in December 2006

Personal information
- Born: 17 February 1966 (age 60) Lunde, Telemark, Norway

Skiing career
- Sport: Alpine skiing
- Disciplines: Downhill, super-G, combined
- World Cup debut: 21 January 1985 (age 18)

Olympics
- Teams: 3 – (1988, 1992, 1994) injured in 1992
- Medals: 0

World Championships
- Teams: 7 – (1985–1997)
- Medals: 3 (2 gold)

World Cup
- Seasons: 13 – (1985–1997)
- Wins: 7 – (6 DH, 1 SG)
- Podiums: 26 – (19 DH, 7 SG)
- Overall titles: 0 – (6th in 1990, '91, '93)
- Discipline titles: 1 – (SG, 1996)
Medal record
Men's alpine skiing
Representing Norway
World Championships
Gold medal – first place	1996 Sierra Nevada	Super-G
Gold medal – first place	1997 Sestriere	Super-G
Silver medal – second place	1993 Morioka	Downhill

Atle Skårdal (born 17 February 1966) is a Norwegian former World Cup alpine ski racer in the speed events of Downhill and Super-G. Since 2012, he is FIS racing director for women races, as successor of Kurt Hoch. A two-time world champion in the Super-G in 1996 and 1997, he was also the World Cup champion in Super-G in 1996. Skårdal competed at the 1988 and 1994 Winter Olympics, with a 6th place in the 1994 Super G his best finish.

In 2000, Skårdal was appointed as national team coach of Norway. He has been FIS race director for the women's World Cup since 2005.

He is married to former alpine ski racer Karin Köllerer of Austria; they have three child ren together.

== Achievements ==
- World Champion in Super-G at the 1996 and 1997
- Silver in Downhill at the 1993 World Championships
- Won the World Cup season title in the Super-G in 1996

== World Cup results ==
=== Season titles ===
1 title: 1 Super-G

Season	Discipline
1996	Super-G

=== Season standings ===
Season	Age	Overall	Slalom	Giant Slalom	Super-G	Downhill	Combined
1985	19	87	—	—	—	—	32
1986	20	60	—	—	—	22	—
1987	21	48	—	—	—	17	—
1988	22	46	—	—	—	19	—
1989	23	29	—	—	—	17	6
1990	24	6	—	—	5	2	—
1991	25	6	—	—	3	2	—
1992	26	50	—	—	22	22	—
1993	27	6	—	—	11	2	—
1994	28	9	—	—	5	6	9
1995	29	19	—	—	6	17	8
1996	30	15	—	—	1	12	—
1997	31	11	—	—	7	6	—

=== Race victories ===
- 7 wins – (6 DH, 1 SG)
- 26 podiums – (19 DH, 7 SG)

Season	Date	Location	Discipline
1990	20 Jan 1990	Kitzbühel, Austria	Downhill
1990	17 Mar 1990	Åre, Sweden	Downhill
1991	15 Dec 1990	Val Gardena, Italy	Downhill
1991	15 Mar 1991	Lake Louise, Canada	Downhill
1993	27 Feb 1993	Whistler, Canada	Downhill
1994	12 Mar 1994	Whistler, Canada	Downhill
1996	10 Dec 1995	Val d'Isère, France	Super-G

== World Championships results ==
Year	Age	Slalom	Giant slalom	Super-G	Downhill	Combined
1985	19	—	—	—	—	14
1987	21	—	—	—	—	12
1989	23	—	—	—	6	15
1991	25	—	—	—	6	—
1993	27	—	—	—	2	—
1996	30	—	—	1	23	—
1997	31	—	—	1	13	—

== Olympic results ==
Year	Age	Slalom	Giant slalom	Super-G	Downhill	Combined
1988	22	—	—	—	15	—
1992	26	—	—	—	—	—
1994	28	—	—	6	9	—

Skardal was injured in January 1992 and missed the Olympics.
