= Günther Mader =

Austrian alpine skier

Personal information
- Born: 24 June 1964 (age 62) Matrei am Brenner, Tyrol, Austria
- Height: 177 cm (5 ft 10 in)
- Website: guenthermader.at

Skiing career
- Sport: Alpine skiing
- Club: SC Gries Am Brenner
- Retired: March 1998 (age 33)
- Disciplines: Downhill, super-G, giant slalom, slalom, combined
- World Cup debut: 22 December 1982 (age 18)

Olympics
- Teams: 4 - (1988-98)
- Medals: 1 (0 gold)

World Championships
- Teams: 7 - (1985-97)
- Medals: 6 (0 gold)

World Cup
- Seasons: 16 - (1983-98)
- Wins: 14
- Podiums: 44
- Overall titles: 0 - (2nd in 1995 & 1996)
- Discipline titles: 2 - (1 GS, 1 K )
Medal record
Men's alpine skiing
Representing Austria
World Cup race podiums
Event	1st	2nd	3rd
Slalom	1	0	4
Giant slalom	2	3	3
Downhill	1	2	3
Super-G	6	4	2
Combined	4	2	4
Total	14	11	16
Olympic Games
Bronze medal – third place	1992 Albertville	Downhill
World Championships
Silver medal – second place	1987 Crans-Montana	Slalom
Bronze medal – third place	1987 Crans-Montana	Combined
Bronze medal – third place	1989 Vail	Combined
Bronze medal – third place	1991 Saalbach	Combined
Bronze medal – third place	1996 Sierra Nevada	Combined
Bronze medal – third place	1997 Sestriere	Super-G

Günther Mader (born 24 June 1964) is a former alpine ski racer and Olympic medalist from Austria. Born in Matrei am Brenner, Tyrol, he is one of only five men to have won World Cup races in all five alpine disciplines (downhill, super-G, giant slalom, slalom, and combined).

== Career ==
Mader made his World Cup debut at age 18 and competed for 16 seasons, including four Winter Olympics and seven world championships. He was the bronze medalist in the downhill at the 1992 Olympics and won a total of six medals in the world championships. He won his first championship medal, the silver medal in the slalom Race at Crans Montana in 1987, after only placing eighth after the first leg of the competition. Mader won two World Cup season titles, giant slalom in 1990 and combined in 1996, and placed second in the overall World Cup standings in 1995 and 1996, and third in 1990. Without his 14 wins, he did achieve another 27 places in World Cup races.

His only World Cup victory in downhill was the prestigious Hahnenkamm in Kitzbühel, Austria, in 1996 at age 31. Mader retired from competition after the 1998 season with 14 World Cup victories, 44 podiums, and 146 top ten finishes.

Only 13 days after his retirement in March 1998, he suffered a stroke: as a result the right side of his body was paralysed and he lost 85 percent of his vocabulary. However he recovered to the greatest possible extent. After convalescence, he wrote a book titled ÜberLeben which covered his career, the stroke and his work as director of racing at ski manufacturer Salomon in Austria, a position he took up during his recovery from his stroke. ÜberLeben has a double meaning in German, translatable as "about life" but also as "survival".

== World Cup victories ==
=== Season titles ===
Season	Discipline
1990	Giant slalom
1996	Combined

=== Individual races ===
- 14 victories - (1 DH, 6 SG, 2 GS, 1 SL, 4 K)
- 44 podiums - (6 DH, 12 SG, 8 GS, 5 SL, 13 K)

Season	Date	Location	Race
1986	21 Feb 1986	Wengen, Switzerland	Combined
1986	2 Mar 1986	Geilo, Norway	Slalom
1988	20 Mar 1988	Åre, Sweden	Combined
1990	2 Dec 1989	Mt. Ste. Anne, Canada	Giant slalom
1990	30 Jan 1990	Les Menuires, France	Super-G
1991	6 Jan 1991	Garmisch, Germany	Super-G
1992	8 Mar 1992	Panorama, Canada	Super-G
1993	28 Mar 1993	Whistler, Canada	Super-G
1994	27 Nov 1993	Park City, USA	Giant slalom
1994	12 Dec 1993	Val-d'Isère, France	Super-G
1995	16 Jan 1995	Kitzbühel, Austria	Super-G
1996	13 Jan 1996	Kitzbühel, Austria	Downhill
1996	14 Jan 1996	Kitzbühel, Austria	Combined
1997	12 Jan 1997	Chamonix, France	Combined
