= Franz Heinzer =

Swiss alpine skier

Personal information
- Born: 11 April 1962 (age 64) Rickenbach, Schwyz, Switzerland
- Height: 181 cm (5 ft 11 in)

Skiing career
- Sport: Alpine skiing
- Retired: March 1994 – (age 31)
- Disciplines: Downhill, Super G, Combined
- World Cup debut: 1981 – (age 18)

Olympics
- Teams: 3 – (1988–94)
- Medals: 0

World Championships
- Teams: 6 – (1982–93)
- Medals: 1 (1 gold)

World Cup
- Seasons: 14 – (1981–94)
- Wins: 17 – (15 DH, 2 K)
- Podiums: 45
- Overall titles: 0
- Discipline titles: 4 – (3 DH, 1 SG)
Medal record
Men's alpine skiing
Representing Switzerland
World Cup race podiums
Event	1st	2nd	3rd
Downhill	15	10	9
Super-G	0	4	2
Combined	2	2	1
Total	17	16	12
World Championships
Gold medal – first place	1991 Saalbach	Downhill

Franz Heinzer (born 11 April 1962) is a Swiss former alpine ski racer, who specialized in downhill. He was World Cup champion in downhill three consecutive seasons (1991, 1992, 1993), second only to Franz Klammer (4 consecutive). He won a total of 15 World Cup downhill races, fourth behind Klammer (25), Peter Müller (19) and Stephan Eberharter (18). Together with Franz Klammer, Toni Sailer, Jean Claude Killy, Karl Schranz and Stephan Eberharter, he is considered among the best downhill racers of all time. He also won the season title in Super-G in 1991.

== Career ==
Heinzer won at the world's most famous downhill venues: Kitzbühel (3x), Wengen, Val Gardena (2x), Garmisch, Val-d'Isère, Aspen, Lake Louise, and St. Anton. His victory in the downhill event at the 1991 World Championships came after three fourth places at previous championships (Schladming (1982), Bormio (1985) and Crans-Montana (1987). He didn't compete in the downhill at Vail in 1989. At the 1994 Winter Olympics in Norway, his right binding released at the starting gate, putting him out of the downhill race.

A month later, Heinzer retired from international competition at age 31 with 17 World Cup victories and 45 podiums. He now runs his own sports products company in Altdorf, and since the winter of 2004, also works as the assistant coach of Swiss national downhill team.

The Franz Heinzer Piste in the Swiss ski resort of Stoos, a FIS-approved downhill run on the Klingenstock, is named in his honour.

== World Cup results ==
=== Season standings ===
Season	Age	Overall	Slalom	Giant slalom	Super-G	Downhill	Combined
1981	18	36	—	—	not run	10	—
1982	19	26	—	—	not run	10	—
1983	20	26	—	19	not awarded	19	9
1984	21	6	—	18	not awarded	8	4
1985	22	5	—	36	not awarded	6	2
1986	23	13	—	—	10	9	8
1987	24	12	—	—	25	3	—
1988	25	8	—	—	16	3	13
1989	26	31	—	—	20	14	—
1990	27	17	—	—	21	7	21
1991	28	4	—	—	1	1	—
1992	29	5	—	—	7	1	—
1993	30	3	—	—	3	1	—
1994	31	36	—	—	29	16	—

=== Season titles ===
4 season titles: 3 downhill, 1 super G

Season	Discipline
1991	Downhill
1991	Super-G
1992	Downhill
1993	Downhill

=== Individual races ===
17 race victories: 15 downhill, 2 combined

Season	Date	Location	Race
1983	19 December 1982	Val Gardena, Italy	Combined
1984	9 December 1983	Val-d'Isère, France	Downhill
1984	10 December 1983	Val-d'Isère, France	Combined
1986	22 February 1986	Åre, Sweden	Downhill
1987	4 January 1987	Laax, Switzerland	Downhill
1988	11 March 1988	Beaver Creek, USA	Downhill
1991	14 December 1990	Val Gardena, Italy	Downhill
1991	12 January 1991	Kitzbühel, Austria	Downhill
1991	8 March 1991	Aspen, USA	Downhill
1991	16 March 1991	Lake Louise, Canada	Downhill
1992	14 December 1991	Val Gardena, Italy	Downhill
1992	17 January 1992	Kitzbühel, Austria	Downhill
1992	18 January 1992	Kitzbühel, Austria	Downhill
1992	25 January 1992	Wengen, Switzerland	Downhill
1993	10 January 1993	Garmisch, Germany	Downhill
1993	16 January 1993	St. Anton, Austria	Downhill
1993	23 January 1993	Veysonnaz, Switzerland	Downhill
