= Peter Runggaldier =

Italian alpine skier

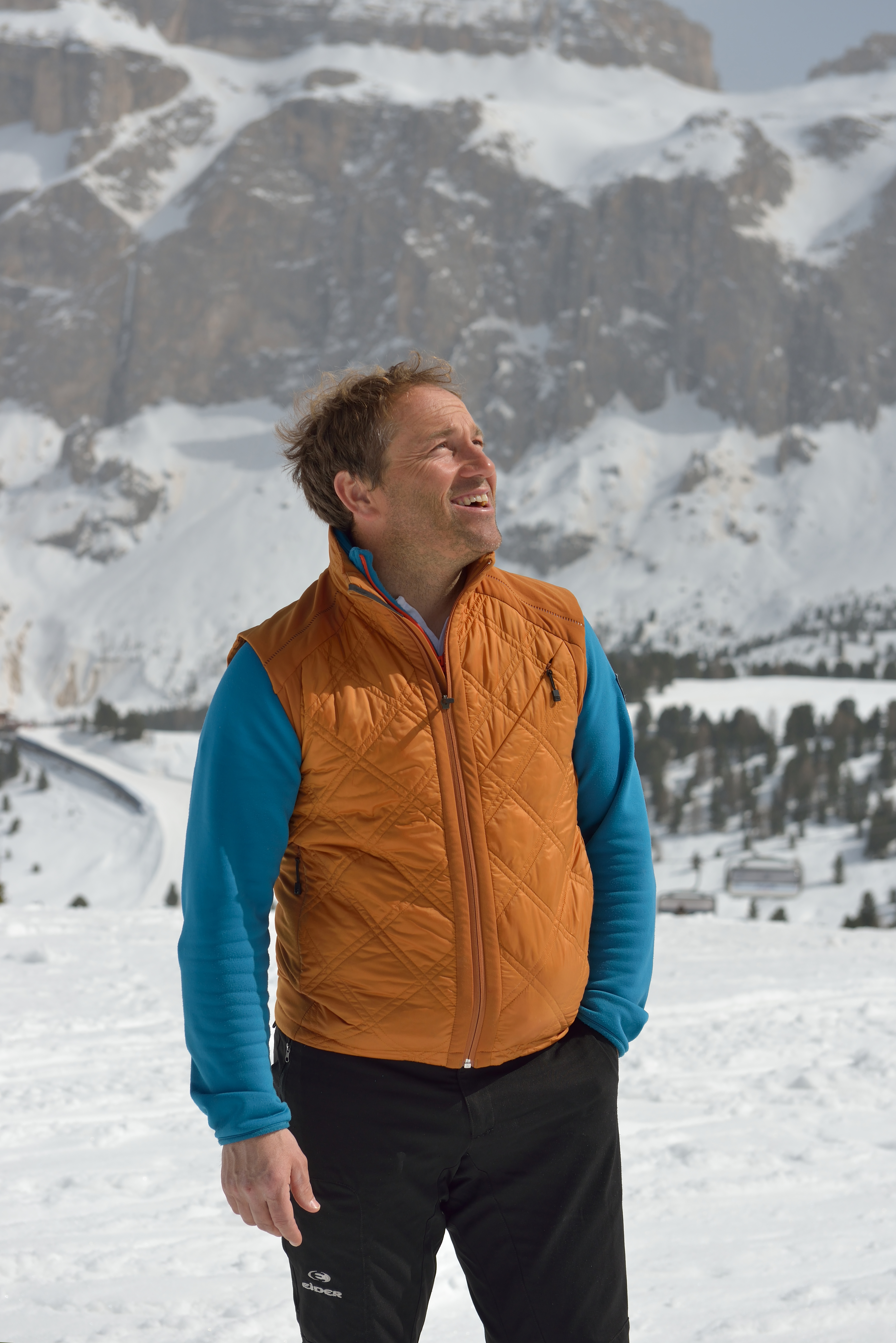
- Peter Runggaldier in his mountain village

Personal information
- Born: 29 December 1968 (age 57) Brixen, Italy

Skiing career
- Sport: Alpine skiing

World Championships
- Medals: 1 (0 gold)

World Cup
- Seasons: 0
- Wins: 2
- Podiums: 12
- Overall titles: 0
- Discipline titles: 1
Medal record
International alpine ski competitions
Event	1st	2nd	3rd
Olympic Games	0	0	0
World Championships	0	1	0
Total	0	1	0
World Cup race podiums
Event	1st	2nd	3rd
Downhill	0	3	2
Super-G	2	2	3
Total	2	5	5
World Championships
Silver medal – second place	1991 Saalbach	Downhill

Peter Runggaldier (born 29 December 1968 in Brixen and living in Sëlva, South Tyrol) is an Italian former Alpine skier, who specialized in downhill and super-G disciplines. He competed at the 1994 Winter Olympics and the 1998 Winter Olympics.

== Biography ==
Born in Sëlva, Italy, he won two World Cup races, as well as the Super-G World Cup in 1995. Today he controls the "Competition centre" of the Ski School of Selva.

== World Cup victories ==
Date	Location	Race
March 10, 1995	(Canada) Whistler	Super-G
March 3, 1996	(Japan) Happo One	Super-G

== See also ==
- Italian skiers most successful race winner
