= 1991 Alpine Skiing World Cup – Men's overall =

1991 men's overall World Cup
Previous: 1990	Next: 1992

Men's overall World Cup 1990/1991

In men's overall World Cup all results count. The parallel slalom did not count for the Overall World Cup.

Place	Name	Country	Total points	Downhill	Super G	Giant	Slalom	Combined
1	Marc Girardelli	Luxembourg	242	8	15	84	110	25
2	Alberto Tomba	Italy	222	0	0	152	70	0
3	Rudolf Nierlich	Austria	201	0	0	101	100	0
4	Franz Heinzer	Switzerland	199	159	40	0	0	0
5	Ole Kristian Furuseth	Norway	156	0	10	44	102	0
6	Atle Skårdal	Norway	153	125	28	0	0	0
7	Günther Mader	Austria	117	5	26	35	36	15
8	Paul Accola	Switzerland	114	0	13	22	67	12
9	Lasse Kjus	Norway	103	5	6	30	42	20
10	Thomas Fogdö	Sweden	95	0	0	0	95	0
11	Daniel Mahrer	Switzerland	93	81	12	0	0	0
12	Stephan Eberharter	Austria	88	0	33	35	9	11
13	Thomas Stangassinger	Austria	80	0	0	0	80	0
14	Armin Bittner	Germany	77	0	0	15	62	0
15	Urs Kälin	Switzerland	70	0	6	64	0	0
16	Hannes Zehentner	Germany	68	50	18	0	0	0
17	Kjetil André Aamodt	Norway	67	0	19	32	16	0
18	Franck Piccard	France	66	11	27	28	0	0
19	Michael Tritscher	Austria	65	0	0	1	64	0
20	Helmut Höflehner	Austria	64	64	0	0	0	0
	Rob Boyd	Canada	64	62	0	0	0	2
22	Kristian Ghedina	Italy	63	40	40	3	0	10
23	Patrick Ortlieb	Austria	61	56	5	0	0	0
24	Mats Ericson	Sweden	60	0	0	4	56	0
25	Lasse Arnesen	Norway	56	44	12	0	0	0
26	Fredrik Nyberg	Sweden	52	0	0	52	0	0
27	Leonhard Stock	Austria	50	50	0	0	0	0
	William Besse	Switzerland	50	47	0	0	0	3
29	Bernhard Gstrein	Austria	48	0	0	0	48	0
30	Peter Roth	Germany	46	0	0	0	46	0
31	Jan Einar Thorsen	Norway	42	36	0	0	0	6
	Rainer Salzgeber	Austria	42	0	12	30	0	0
33	Johan Wallner	Sweden	41	0	0	34	7	0
34	Josef Polig	Italy	38	0	12	7	11	8
35	Luc Alphand	France	37	22	15	0	0	0
	Fabio De Crignis	Italy	37	0	0	0	37	0
37	Patrick Holzer	Italy	36	0	20	16	0	0
38	Peter Runggaldier	Italy	35	23	3	0	0	9
39	Niklas Henning	Sweden	31	24	7	0	0	0
40	Berni Huber	Germany	30	30	0	0	0	0
	Markus Wasmeier	Germany	30	0	25	0	0	5
42	Tetsuya Okabe	Japan	29	0	0	0	29	0
43	Martin Knöri	Switzerland	27	0	0	27	0	0
	Jonas Nilsson	Sweden	27	0	0	0	27	0
45	Peter Wirnsberger	Austria	26	26	0	0	0	0
	Carlo Gerosa	Italy	26	0	0	0	26	0
	Hubert Strolz	Austria	26	0	4	12	10	0
48	Konrad Ladstätter	Italy	25	0	0	0	25	0
49	Michael von Grünigen	Switzerland	24	0	0	14	10	0
50	Konrad Walk	Austria	22	0	0	22	0	0
	A. J. Kitt	United States	22	21	0	0	0	1
52	Mitja Kunc	Yugoslavia	20	0	0	20	0	0
	Hans Pieren	Switzerland	20	0	0	20	0	0
54	Xavier Gigandet	Switzerland	18	11	0	0	0	7
55	Lars-Börje Eriksson	Sweden	17	0	6	11	0	0
56	Steve Locher	Switzerland	16	0	7	9	0	0
57	Karl Alpiger	Switzerland	15	14	1	0	0	0
58	Bernhard Fahner	Switzerland	13	13	0	0	0	0
59	Didrik Marksten	Norway	12	0	12	0	0	0
	Jeremy Nobis	United States	12	0	0	12	0	0
61	Jean-Luc Crétier	France	11	0	11	0	0	0
	Finn Christian Jagge	Norway	11	0	0	0	11	0
63	Helmut Mayer	Austria	10	0	0	10	0	0
	Peter Müller	Switzerland	10	10	0	0	0	0
	Christophe Plé	France	10	10	0	0	0	0
	Brian Stemmle	Canada	10	10	0	0	0	0
67	Erwin Resch	Austria	9	9	0	0	0	0
	Peter Rzehak	Austria	9	9	0	0	0	0
	François Simond	France	9	0	0	0	9	0
70	Hans-Jörg Tauscher	Germany	8	4	0	0	0	4
	Alain Feutrier	France	8	0	0	6	2	0
	Luca Pesando	Italy	8	0	0	8	0	0
	Patrice Bianchi	France	8	0	0	0	8	0
74	Tommy Moe	United States	7	7	0	0	0	0
	Roberto Spampatti	Italy	7	0	0	2	5	0
	Ed Podivinsky	Canada	7	7	0	0	0	0
	Richard Pramotton	Italy	7	0	0	5	2	0
78	Christian Polig	Italy	6	0	0	0	6	0
	Felix Belczyk	Canada	6	6	0	0	0	0
	Denis Rey	France	6	6	0	0	0	0
81	Alain Villiard	Canada	5	0	0	0	5	0
	Armin Assinger	Austria	5	5	0	0	0	0
83	Asgeir Linberg	Norway	4	0	4	0	0	0
	Lukas Perathoner	Italy	4	4	0	0	0	0
	Christophe Berra	Switzerland	4	0	0	0	4	0
86	Heinz Peter Platter	Italy	3	0	0	0	3	0
	Harald Christian Strand Nilsen	Norway	3	0	0	0	3	0
88	Oliver Künzi	Switzerland	2	0	0	0	2	0
	Michael Mair	Italy	2	2	0	0	0	0
	Roger Pramotton	Italy	2	0	0	0	2	0
91	Bernhard Bauer	Germany	1	0	0	0	1	0
	Giovanni Moro	Italy	1	0	0	0	1	0
	Kyle Rasmussen	United States	1	1	0	0	0	0
	Patrick Staub	Switzerland	1	0	0	0	1	0

Alpine skiing World Cup
Men

Overall | Downhill | Super G | Giant slalom | Slalom | Combined

1991
