= 1992 Alpine Skiing World Cup – Men's giant slalom =

1992 Men's giant slalom World Cup
Previous: 1991	Next: 1993

Men's giant slalom World Cup 1991/1992

== Calendar ==
Round	Race No	Place	Country	Date	Winner	Second	Third
1	1	Park City	United States	November 23, 1991	(Italy) Alberto Tomba	(Switzerland) Paul Accola	(Italy) Roberto Spampatti
2	3	Breckenridge	United States	November 29, 1991	(Switzerland) Paul Accola	(Italy) Alberto Tomba	(Sweden) Fredrik Nyberg
3	9	Alta Badia	Italy	December 15, 1991	(Italy) Alberto Tomba	(Switzerland) Steve Locher	(Switzerland) Paul Accola
4	11	Kranjska Gora	Slovenia	January 4, 1992	(Italy) Sergio Bergamelli	(Switzerland) Hans Pieren	(Italy) Alberto Tomba
5	21	Adelboden	France	January 22, 1992	(Norway) Ole Kristian Furuseth	(Switzerland) Hans Pieren	(Luxembourg) Marc Girardelli
6	26	St. Gervais	France	February 2, 1992	(Norway) Didrik Marksten	(Italy) Alberto Tomba	(Germany) Markus Wasmeier
7	33	Crans Montana	Switzerland	March 20, 1992	(Italy) Alberto Tomba	(Norway) Kjetil André Aamodt	(Norway) Didrik Marksten

== Final point standings ==
In men's giant slalom World Cup 1991/92 all results count.

Place	Name	Country	Total points	1 (United States)	3 (United States)	9 (Italy)	11 (Slovenia)	21 (Switzerland)	26 (France)	33 (Switzerland)
1	Alberto Tomba	Italy	520	100	80	100	60	-	80	100
2	Hans Pieren	Switzerland	400	43	40	55	80	80	51	51
3	Paul Accola	Switzerland	330	80	100	60	43	-	-	47
4	Ole Kristian Furuseth	Norway	285	24	43	16	47	100	55	-
5	Johan Wallner	Sweden	238	51	24	18	51	51	-	43
6	Steve Locher	Switzerland	237	-	51	80	24	40	26	16
7	Marc Girardelli	Luxembourg	210	-	24	14	34	60	47	31
8	Sergio Bergamelli	Italy	205	31	-	31	100	-	-	43
	Franck Piccard	France	205	40	37	37	5	-	31	55
10	Fredrik Nyberg	Sweden	204	6	60	22	26	22	40	28
11	Kjetil André Aamodt	Norway	196	-	-	-	18	55	43	80
12	Didrik Marksten	Norway	190	16	14	-	-	-	100	60
13	Roberto Spampatti	Italy	185	60	47	24	22	12	12	8
14	Michael von Grünigen	Switzerland	183	9	31	51	55	-	-	37
15	Josef Polig	Italy	167	47	26	47	-	28	16	3
16	Patrick Holzer	Italy	125	-	2	40	28	47	8	-
17	Rainer Salzgeber	Austria	117	28	5	43	-	-	37	4
18	Alberto Senigagliesi	Italy	97	55	-	-	20	-	22	-
19	Tobias Barnerssoi	Germany	91	37	16	-	7	16	5	10
20	Marco Hangl	Switzerland	90	20	20	26	-	-	24	-
21	Marcel Sulliger	Switzerland	89	-	-	28	40	-	14	7
22	Peter Roth	Germany	85	-	-	14	37	34	-	-
23	Markus Wasmeier	Germany	84	-	-	-	10	-	60	14
	Martin Knöri	Switzerland	84	12	9	-	-	43	-	20
25	Urs Kälin	Switzerland	77	-	55	-	-	-	-	22
26	Stéphane Exartier	France	76	34	18	-	8	10	6	-
27	Christian Mayer	Austria	71	-	-	37	-	-	34	-
28	Helmut Mayer	Austria	69	-	10	10	3	26	20	-
29	Armin Bittner	Germany	68	-	4	-	31	31	-	2
30	Luca Pesando	Italy	63	26	28	9	-	-	-	-
31	Richard Pramotton	Italy	54	7	6	7	-	-	10	24
32	Alain Feutrier	France	52	-	12	20	-	20	-	-
33	Günther Mader	Austria	48	5	34	-	-	-	4	5
34	Mitja Kunc	Yugoslavia	47	-	-	8	4	9	-	26
35	Lasse Kjus	Norway	43	-	-	-	-	-	9	34
36	Hubert Strolz	Austria	40	3	-	-	9	-	28	-
	Konrad Walk	Austria	40	4	-	-	-	-	18	18
38	Günther Marxer	Liechtenstein	37	-	-	-	-	37	-	-
39	Stéphane Cretin	France	34	18	-	-	16	-	-	-
40	Richard Kröll	Austria	33	-	-	-	-	24	-	9
41	Patrick Staub	Switzerland	32	-	-	-	12	14	-	6
	Michael Tritscher	Austria	32	22	3	-	-	7	-	-
43	Stephan Eberharter	Austria	19	-	-	-	-	-	7	12
44	Patrick Wirth	Austria	18	-	-	-	-	18	-	-
45	Matteo Belfrond	Italy	14	14	-	-	-	-	-	-
	Michel Lucatelli	France	14	-	-	-	14	-	-	-
47	Gregor Grilc	Yugoslavia	12	-	-	-	6	6	-	-
48	Joe Levins	United States	10	10	-	-	-	-	-	-
49	Matthew Grosjean	United States	8	8	-	-	-	-	-	-
	Fabio De Crignis	Italy	8	-	8	-	-	-	-	-
	Jure Košir	Yugoslavia	8	-	-	-	-	8	-	-
52	Ian Piccard	France	7	-	7	-	-	-	-	-
53	Franck Carmagnolle	France	6	-	-	6	-	-	-	-

Alpine Skiing World Cup
Men

Overall | Downhill | Super G | Giant slalom | Slalom | Combined

1992
