= 1991–92 FIS Alpine Ski World Cup =

International sports competition

FIS Alpine Ski World Cup 1991/92
Discipline	Men	Women
Overall	(Switzerland) Paul Accola	(Austria) Petra Kronberger
Downhill	(Switzerland) Franz Heinzer	(Germany) Katja Seizinger
Super G	(Switzerland) Paul Accola	(France) Carole Merle
Giant Slalom	(Italy) Alberto Tomba	(France) Carole Merle
Slalom	(Italy) Alberto Tomba	(Switzerland) Vreni Schneider
Nations Cup	Switzerland	Austria
- Nations Cup overall: Austria

Competition
Locations	18	15
Individual	34	30

The 26th World Cup season began in November 1991 in the United States and concluded in March 1992 in Switzerland. The overall winners were Paul Accola of Switzerland, his first, and Petra Kronberger of Austria, her third straight.

A major change during this season was made to the scoring system, moving from a "Top 15" system, with 25 points for first, 20 for second, and 15 for third down to 1 for 15th, to a "Top 30" system, with 100 for first, 80 for second, and 60 for third down to 1 for 30th. A slight change was made to the points awarded at lower levels in 1992–93, and that revised system has remained in effect until the present. This was also the first season after the dissolution of Yugoslavia into multiple nations, with its traditional skiing resorts (Kranjska Gora and Maribor) becoming part of Slovenia, and the Soviet Union also dissolved during this season, on 25/26 December 1991.

A break in the schedule in February was for the 1992 Winter Olympics in Albertville, France from 9–22 February.

== Calendar ==
=== Men ===
Event Key: DH – Downhill, SL – Slalom, GS – Giant Slalom, SG – Super Giant Slalom, KB – Combined
Race	Season	Date	Place	Type	Winner	Second	Third
726	1	23 November 1991	(United States) Park City	GS _{192}	(Italy) Alberto Tomba	(Switzerland) Paul Accola	(Italy) Roberto Spampatti
727	2	24 November 1991	(United States) Park City	SL _{222}	(Italy) Alberto Tomba	(Switzerland) Paul Accola	(Italy) Konrad Ladstätter
728	3	29 November 1991	(United States) Breckenridge	GS _{193}	(Switzerland) Paul Accola	(Italy) Alberto Tomba	(Sweden) Fredrik Nyberg
729	4	30 November 1991	(United States) Breckenridge	SL _{223}	(Switzerland) Paul Accola	(Sweden) Thomas Fogdö (Italy) Alberto Tomba	
730	5	7 December 1991	(France) Val d'Isère	DH _{215}	(United States) A. J. Kitt	(Austria) Leonhard Stock	(Switzerland) Franz Heinzer
731	6	8 December 1991	(France) Val d'Isère	SG _{040}	(Luxembourg) Marc Girardelli	(Norway) Atle Skårdal	(Switzerland) Urs Kälin
732	7	10 December 1991	(Italy) Sestriere	SL _{224}	(Italy) Alberto Tomba	(Norway) Finn Christian Jagge	(Norway) Ole Kristian Furuseth
733	8	14 December 1991	(Italy) Val Gardena	DH _{216}	(Switzerland) Franz Heinzer	(Austria) Leonhard Stock	(Norway) Atle Skårdal
734	9	15 December 1991	(Italy) Alta Badia	GS _{194}	(Italy) Alberto Tomba	(Switzerland) Steve Locher	(Switzerland) Paul Accola
735	10	17 December 1991	(Italy) Madonna di Campiglio	SL _{225}	(Norway) Finn Christian Jagge	(Italy) Alberto Tomba	(Sweden) Thomas Fogdö
736	11	4 January 1992	(Slovenia) Kranjska Gora	GS _{195}	(Italy) Sergio Bergamelli	(Switzerland) Hans Pieren	(Italy) Alberto Tomba
737	12	5 January 1992	(Slovenia) Kranjska Gora	SL _{226}	(Italy) Alberto Tomba	(Germany) Armin Bittner	(Norway) Finn Christian Jagge
738	13	11 January 1992	(Germany) Garmisch-Partenkirchen	DH _{217}	(Germany) Markus Wasmeier	(Austria) Patrick Ortlieb	(Germany) Hansjörg Tauscher
739	14	12 January 1992	(Germany) Garmisch-Partenkirchen	SG _{041}	(Italy) Patrick Holzer	(Switzerland) Paul Accola	(Austria) Peter Rzehak
740	15	13 January 1992	(Germany) Garmisch-Partenkirchen	SL _{227}	(France) Patrice Bianchi	(Austria) Hubert Strolz	(Italy) Alberto Tomba
741	16	13 January 1992	(Germany) Garmisch-Partenkirchen	KB _{060}	(Switzerland) Paul Accola	(Norway) Ole Kristian Furuseth	(Austria) Hubert Strolz
742	17	17 January 1992	(Austria) Kitzbühel	DH _{218}	(Switzerland) Franz Heinzer	(Switzerland) Daniel Mahrer	(Switzerland) Xavier Gigandet
743	18	18 January 1992	(Austria) Kitzbühel	DH _{219}	(Switzerland) Franz Heinzer	(United States) A. J. Kitt	(Austria) Patrick Ortlieb
744	19	19 January 1992	(Austria) Kitzbühel	SL _{228}	(Italy) Alberto Tomba	(France) Patrice Bianchi	(Germany) Armin Bittner
745	20	19 January 1992	(Austria) Kitzbühel	KB _{061}	(Switzerland) Paul Accola	(Luxembourg) Marc Girardelli	(Austria) Hubert Strolz
746	21	22 January 1992	(Switzerland) Adelboden	GS _{196}	(Norway) Ole Kristian Furuseth	(Switzerland) Hans Pieren	(Luxembourg) Marc Girardelli
747	22	25 January 1992	(Switzerland) Wengen	DH _{220}	(Switzerland) Franz Heinzer	(Germany) Markus Wasmeier	(Austria) Helmut Höflehner
748	23	26 January 1992	(Switzerland) Wengen	SL _{229}	(Italy) Alberto Tomba	(Switzerland) Paul Accola	(Germany) Armin Bittner
749	24	26 January 1992	(Switzerland) Wengen	KB _{062}	(Switzerland) Paul Accola	(Austria) Günther Mader	(Austria) Hubert Strolz
750	25	1 February 1992	(France) Megève	SG _{042}	(Switzerland) Paul Accola	(Switzerland) Marco Hangl	(Switzerland) Franz Heinzer
751	26	2 February 1992	(France) St. Gervais	GS _{197}	(Norway) Didrik Marksten	(Italy) Alberto Tomba	(Germany) Markus Wasmeier
1992 Winter Olympics (9–22 February)
752	27	1 March 1992	(Japan) Morioka	SG _{043}	(Switzerland) Paul Accola	(Switzerland) Urs Kälin	(Norway) Jan Einar Thorsen
753	28	6 March 1992	(Canada) Panorama	DH _{221}	(Switzerland) William Besse	(Switzerland) Daniel Mahrer (Austria) Günther Mader	
754	29	7 March 1992	(Canada) Panorama	DH _{222}	(Switzerland) Daniel Mahrer	(Norway) Jan Einar Thorsen	(United States) A. J. Kitt
755	30	8 March 1992	(Canada) Panorama	SG _{044}	(Austria) Günther Mader	(Norway) Kjetil André Aamodt	(Luxembourg) Marc Girardelli
756	31	14 March 1992	(United States) Aspen	DH _{223}	(Switzerland) Daniel Mahrer	(Switzerland) William Besse	(Austria) Patrick Ortlieb
757	32	15 March 1992	(United States) Aspen	SG _{045}	(Norway) Kjetil André Aamodt	(Austria) Günther Mader	(Switzerland) Paul Accola
758	33	20 March 1992	(Switzerland) Crans-Montana	GS _{198}	(Italy) Alberto Tomba	(Norway) Kjetil André Aamodt	(Norway) Didrik Marksten
759	34	22 March 1992	(Switzerland) Crans-Montana	SL _{230}	(Italy) Alberto Tomba	(Switzerland) Paul Accola	(Norway) Finn Christian Jagge

=== Ladies ===
Event Key: DH – Downhill, SL – Slalom, GS – Giant Slalom, SG – Super Giant Slalom, KB – Combined
Race	Season	Date	Place	Type	Winner	Second	Third
674	1	30 November 1991	(Austria) Lech am Arlberg	SL _{215}	(Switzerland) Vreni Schneider	(Austria) Petra Kronberger	(Sweden) Pernilla Wiberg
675	2	1 December 1991	(Austria) Lech am Arlberg	SL _{216}	(Spain) Blanca Fernández Ochoa	(Switzerland) Vreni Schneider	(Austria) Petra Kronberger
676	3	7 December 1991	(Italy) Santa Caterina	SG _{038}	(Germany) Katja Seizinger	(Austria) Barbara Sadleder	(Germany) Miriam Vogt
	4	8 December 1991	(Italy) Santa Caterina	GS	(Switzerland) Vreni Schneider	(Italy) Deborah Compagnoni	(United States) Diann Roffe
678	5	14 December 1991	(Italy) Santa Caterina	DH _{182}	(Switzerland) Chantal Bournissen	(Germany) Katja Seizinger	(Switzerland) Heidi Zurbriggen
679	6	15 December 1991	(Italy) Santa Caterina	SG _{039}	(France) Carole Merle	(Austria) Petra Kronberger	(Switzerland) Heidi Zurbriggen
680	7	21 December 1991	(France) Serre Chevalier	DH _{183}	(Austria) Petra Kronberger	(Switzerland) Heidi Zurbriggen	(Germany) Miriam Vogt
681	8	5 January 1992	(Germany) Oberstaufen	GS _{188}	(Switzerland) Vreni Schneider	(Italy) Deborah Compagnoni	(France) Carole Merle
682	9	11 January 1992	(Austria) Schruns	DH _{184}	(Germany) Katja Seizinger	(Austria) Sabine Ginther	(Commonwealth of Independent States) Svetlana Gladysheva
683	10	12 January 1992	(Austria) Schruns	SL _{217}	(Austria) Sabine Ginther	(Spain) Blanca Fernández Ochoa	(New Zealand) Annelise Coberger
684	11	12 January 1992	(Austria) Schruns	KB _{055}	(Austria) Sabine Ginther	(Austria) Anja Haas	(Switzerland) Heidi Zurbriggen
685	12	14 January 1992	(Austria) Hinterstoder	SL _{218}	(New Zealand) Annelise Coberger	(Switzerland) Vreni Schneider	(United States) Julie Parisien
686	13	15 January 1992	(Austria) Hinterstoder	GS _{189}	(France) Carole Merle	(Italy) Deborah Compagnoni	(Switzerland) Vreni Schneider
687	14	18 January 1992	(Slovenia) Maribor	SL _{219}	(Switzerland) Vreni Schneider	(Italy) Deborah Compagnoni	(Sweden) Pernilla Wiberg
688	15	20 January 1992	(Italy) Piancavallo	GS _{190}	(France) Carole Merle	(Switzerland) Vreni Schneider	(United States) Eva Twardokens
689	16	25 January 1992	(France) Morzine	DH _{185}	(Germany) Katja Seizinger	(Germany) Katharina Gutensohn	(Germany) Michaela Gerg-Leitner
690	17	26 January 1992	(France) Morzine	SG _{040}	(Italy) Deborah Compagnoni	(Austria) Ulrike Maier	(Norway) Merete Fjeldavlie
	18	27 January 1992	(France) Morzine	GS	(France) Carole Merle	(Italy) Deborah Compagnoni	(United States) Diann Roffe
692	19	1 February 1992	(Switzerland) Grindelwald	DH _{186}	(Austria) Sabine Ginther	(Germany) Miriam Vogt	(Switzerland) Chantal Bournissen
693	20	2 February 1992	(Switzerland) Grindelwald	SL _{220}	(Austria) Monika Maierhofer	(Sweden) Pernilla Wiberg	(New Zealand) Annelise Coberger
694	21	2 February 1992	(Switzerland) Grindelwald	KB _{056}	(Austria) Sabine Ginther	(Austria) Petra Kronberger	(Germany) Miriam Vogt
1992 Winter Olympics (9–22 February)
695	22	28 February 1992	(Norway) Narvik	GS _{192}	(Sweden) Pernilla Wiberg	(Austria) Anita Wachter	(Spain) Blanca Fernández Ochoa
696	23	29 February 1992	(Norway) Narvik	SL _{221}	(Switzerland) Vreni Schneider	(Sweden) Pernilla Wiberg	(Austria) Petra Kronberger
697	24	2 March 1992	(Sweden) Sundsvall	SL _{222}	(United States) Julie Parisien	(Sweden) Pernilla Wiberg	(Austria) Karin Buder
698	25	7 March 1992	(United States) Vail	DH _{187}	(Germany) Katja Seizinger	(Canada) Kerrin Lee-Gartner	(Germany) Miriam Vogt
699	26	8 March 1992	(United States) Vail	SG _{041}	(Norway) Merete Fjeldavlie	(Austria) Petra Kronberger	(France) Carole Merle
700	27	14 March 1992	(Canada) Panorama	DH _{188}	(Austria) Petra Kronberger	(France) Carole Merle	(Germany) Katja Seizinger
701	28	15 March 1992	(Canada) Panorama	SG _{042}	(France) Carole Merle	(Canada) Kerrin Lee-Gartner	(Austria) Sylvia Eder
702	29	19 March 1992	(Switzerland) Crans-Montana	SG _{043}	(France) Carole Merle	(Norway) Merete Fjeldavlie	(Switzerland) Zoë Haas
703	30	21 March 1992	(Switzerland) Crans-Montana	GS _{193}	(France) Carole Merle	(Spain) Blanca Fernández Ochoa	(Switzerland) Corinne Rey-Bellet

== Men ==
=== Overall ===
In Men's Overall World Cup 1991/92 all results count.

Place	Name	Country	Total	DH	SG	GS	SL	KB
1	Paul Accola	Switzerland	1699	52	429	330	588	300
2	Alberto Tomba	Italy	1362	0	22	520	820	0
3	Marc Girardelli	Luxembourg	996	182	296	210	228	80
4	Ole Kristian Furuseth	Norway	854	15	160	285	290	104
5	Franz Heinzer	Switzerland	842	649	193	0	0	0
6	Günther Mader	Austria	797	286	286	48	97	80
7	Markus Wasmeier	Germany	752	371	156	84	0	141
8	Daniel Mahrer	Switzerland	646	537	109	0	0	0
9	Hubert Strolz	Austria	611	0	126	40	265	180
10	Patrick Ortlieb	Austria	594	450	94	0	0	50
	A. J. Kitt	United States	594	461	44	0	0	89
12	Jan Einar Thorsen	Norway	577	324	225	0	0	28
13	Kjetil André Aamodt	Norway	543	0	220	196	72	55
14	Finn Christian Jagge	Norway	533	0	0	0	533	0
15	Leonhard Stock	Austria	477	403	74	0	0	0
16	Armin Bittner	Germany	443	0	0	68	375	0
17	William Besse	Switzerland	441	366	65	0	0	10
18	Hans Pieren	Switzerland	429	0	0	400	29	0
19	Steve Locher	Switzerland	423	0	21	237	82	83
20	Xavier Gigandet	Switzerland	390	325	0	0	0	65

=== Downhill ===
see complete table

In Men's Downhill World Cup 1991/92 all results count. Swiss athletes won seven races out of nine.

Place	Name	Country	Total	5 (France)	8 (Italy)	13 (Germany)	17 (Austria)	18 (Austria)	22 (Switzerland)	28 (Canada)	29 (Canada)	31 (United States)
1	Franz Heinzer	Switzerland	649	60	100	51	100	100	100	40	51	47
2	Daniel Mahrer	Switzerland	537	55	-	47	80	47	28	80	100	100
3	A. J. Kitt	United States	461	100	55	40	22	80	9	55	60	40
4	Patrick Ortlieb	Austria	450	47	51	80	34	60	40	47	31	60
5	Leonhard Stock	Austria	403	80	80	-	31	20	51	43	43	55
6	William Besse	Switzerland	366	9	20	-	51	31	55	100	20	80
7	Markus Wasmeier	Germany	371	28	12	100	24	34	80	1	55	37
8	Xavier Gigandet	Switzerland	325	51	43	28	60	55	34	20	18	16
9	Jan Einar Thorsen	Norway	324	31	28	43	40	37	-	31	80	34
10	Günther Mader	Austria	286	-	-	2	43	43	47	80	47	24

=== Super-G ===
see complete table

In Men's Super-G World Cup 1991/92 all results count.

Place	Name	Country	Total	6 (France)	14 (Germany)	25 (France)	27 (Japan)	30 (Canada)	32 (United States)
1	Paul Accola	Switzerland	429	55	80	100	100	34	60
2	Marc Girardelli	Luxembourg	296	100	24	47	55	60	-
3	Günther Mader	Austria	286	20	31	55	-	100	80
4	Jan Einar Thorsen	Norway	225	8	37	47	60	22	51
5	Kjetil André Aamodt	Norway	220	-	-	40	-	80	100
6	Urs Kälin	Switzerland	215	60	-	4	80	16	55
7	Franz Heinzer	Switzerland	193	47	4	60	51	31	-
8	Ole Kristian Furuseth	Norway	160	24	-	51	34	51	-
9	Markus Wasmeier	Germany	156	31	47	14	9	55	-
10	Marco Hangl	Switzerland	152	51	-	80	-	12	9
11	Alberto Senigagliesi	Italy	151	10	55	-	31	8	47
12	Patrick Holzer	Italy	137	-	100	-	37	-	-

=== Giant Slalom ===
see complete table

In Men's Giant Slalom World Cup 1991/92 all results count. Alberto Tomba won his third Giant Slalom World Cup.

Place	Name	Country	Total	1 (United States)	3 (United States)	9 (Italy)	11 (Slovenia)	21 (Switzerland)	26 (France)	33 (Switzerland)
1	Alberto Tomba	Italy	520	100	80	100	60	-	80	100
2	Hans Pieren	Switzerland	400	43	40	55	80	80	51	51
3	Paul Accola	Switzerland	330	80	100	60	43	-	-	47
4	Ole Kristian Furuseth	Norway	285	24	43	16	47	100	55	-
5	Johan Wallner	Sweden	238	51	24	18	51	51	-	43
6	Steve Locher	Switzerland	237	-	51	80	24	40	26	16
7	Marc Girardelli	Luxembourg	210	-	24	14	34	60	47	31
8	Sergio Bergamelli	Italy	205	31	-	31	100	-	-	43
	Franck Piccard	France	205	40	37	37	5	-	31	55
10	Fredrik Nyberg	Sweden	204	6	60	22	26	22	40	28
11	Kjetil André Aamodt	Norway	196	-	-	-	18	55	43	80
12	Didrik Marksten	Norway	190	16	14	-	-	-	100	60

=== Slalom ===
see complete table

In Men's Slalom World Cup 1991/92 all results count. Alberto Tomba won six races and finished every race on the podium.

Place	Name	Country	Total	2 (United States)	4 (United States)	7 (Italy)	10 (Italy)	12 (Slovenia)	15 (Germany)	19 (Austria)	23 (Switzerland)	34 (Switzerland)
1	Alberto Tomba	Italy	820	100	80	100	80	100	60	100	100	100
2	Paul Accola	Switzerland	588	80	100	55	51	51	40	51	80	80
3	Finn Christian Jagge	Norway	533	51	55	80	100	60	37	43	47	60
4	Armin Bittner	Germany	375	55	-	37	-	80	43	60	60	40
5	Patrice Bianchi	France	293	40	24	31	18	-	100	80	-	-
6	Ole Kristian Furuseth	Norway	290	28	47	60	55	-	47	47	6	-
7	Carlo Gerosa	Italy	288	43	34	43	34	16	34	-	37	47
8	Patrick Staub	Switzerland	277	20	-	8	8	43	55	37	51	55
9	Hubert Strolz	Austria	265	-	10	40	12	-	80	55	40	28
10	Thomas Stangassinger	Austria	257	-	-	47	37	37	31	31	43	31

=== Combined ===
see complete table

In Men's Combined World Cup 1991/92 all three results count. Paul Accola was able to win all three competitions.

Place	Name	Country	Total	16 (Germany)	20 (Austria)	24 (Switzerland)
1	Paul Accola	Switzerland	300	100	100	100
2	Hubert Strolz	Austria	180	60	60	60
3	Markus Wasmeier	Germany	141	51	47	43
4	Josef Polig	Italy	112	47	51	14
5	Stephan Eberharter	Austria	110	55	55	-
6	Ole Kristian Furuseth	Norway	104	80	-	24
7	Rainer Salzgeber	Austria	99	37	31	31
8	A. J. Kitt	United States	89	40	37	12
9	Lasse Arnesen	Norway	85	34	-	51
10	Steve Locher	Switzerland	83	43	40	-

== Ladies ==
=== Overall ===
In Women's Overall World Cup 1991/92 all results count. Petra Kronberger captured her third Overall World Cup win in a row despite having only two wins, both in downhill races. But she was able to score points in all but five competitions under the new "Top 30" scoring system. By contrast, Carole Merle won seven races and, according to the points system used from the following year onwards, she would have won this overall World Cup—which was part of the motivation underlying the point value change before the following season.

Place	Name	Country	Total	DH	SG	GS	SL	KB
1	Petra Kronberger	Austria	1262	432	216	165	369	80
2	Carole Merle	France	1211	228	417	566	0	0
3	Katja Seizinger	Germany	937	523	234	180	0	0
4	Vreni Schneider	Switzerland	902	0	0	391	511	0
5	Pernilla Wiberg	Sweden	821	0	62	314	445	0
6	Sabine Ginther	Austria	746	248	4	70	224	200
7	Blanca Fernández Ochoa	Spain	657	0	6	238	413	0
8	Miriam Vogt	Germany	632	359	137	21	0	115
9	Heidi Zurbriggen	Switzerland	621	277	127	120	0	97
10	Diann Roffe	United States	607	0	221	372	14	0
11	Deborah Compagnoni	Italy	590	0	126	344	120	0
12	Anita Wachter	Austria	564	6	64	225	163	106
13	Ulrike Maier	Austria	561	25	233	256	47	0
14	Kerrin Lee	Canada	553	291	218	44	0	0
15	Julie Parisien	United States	472	0	83	127	262	0
16	Eva Twardokens	United States	465	0	90	251	124	0
17	Michaela Gerg	Germany	449	216	118	115	0	0
18	Chantal Bournissen	Switzerland	411	268	96	0	0	47
19	Sylvia Eder	Austria	396	0	227	169	0	0
20	Regina Häusl	Germany	357	161	114	0	0	82

=== Downhill ===
see complete table

In Women's Downhill World Cup 1991/92 all results count.

Place	Name	Country	Total	5 (Italy)	7 (France)	9 (Austria)	16 (France)	19 (Switzerland)	25 (United States)	27 (Canada)
1	Katja Seizinger	Germany	523	80	43	100	100	40	100	60
2	Petra Kronberger	Austria	432	31	100	40	55	51	55	100
3	Miriam Vogt	Germany	359	43	60	47	47	80	60	22
4	Kerrin Lee	Canada	291	47	55	-	34	47	80	28
5	Heidi Zurbriggen	Switzerland	277	60	80	55	26	12	20	24
6	Chantal Bournissen	Switzerland	268	100	31	-	16	60	47	14
7	Sabine Ginther	Austria	248	40	-	80	28	100	-	-
8	Carole Merle	France	228	51	-	28	40	22	7	80
9	Michaela Gerg	Germany	216	37	-	24	60	22	18	55
10	Katharina Gutensohn	Germany	209	22	-	31	80	5	31	40

=== Super-G ===
see complete table

In Women's Super-G World Cup 1991/92 all results count. Carole Merle won her fourth Super-G World Cup in a row.

Place	Name	Country	Total	3 (Italy)	6 (Italy)	17 (France)	26 (United States)	28 (Canada)	29 (Switzerland)
1	Carole Merle	France	417	14	100	43	60	100	100
2	Merete Fjeldavlie	Norway	309	37	20	60	100	12	80
3	Katja Seizinger	Germany	234	100	40	-	-	51	43
4	Ulrike Maier	Austria	233	-	28	80	51	43	31
5	Sylvia Eder	Austria	227	-	37	24	55	60	51
6	Diann Roffe	United States	221	37	-	55	34	55	40
7	Kerrin Lee	Canada	218	51	-	31	51	80	5
8	Petra Kronberger	Austria	216	-	80	14	80	28	14
9	Heidi Zeller	Switzerland	197	55	51	51	31	-	9
10	Barbara Sadleder	Austria	178	80	22	-	43	9	24
11	Miriam Vogt	Germany	137	60	24	16	12	22	3
12	Regine Mösenlechner	Germany	131	37	47	47	-	-	-
13	Zoe Haas	Switzerland	127	-	5	5	37	20	60
	Heidi Zurbriggen	Switzerland	127	-	60	10	8	47	2
15	Deborah Compagnoni	Italy	126	-	26	100	-	-	-

=== Giant Slalom ===
see complete table

In Women's Giant Slalom World Cup 1991/92 all results count.

Place	Name	Country	Total	4 (Italy)	8 (Germany)	13 (Austria)	15 (Italy)	18 (France)	22 (Norway)	30 (Switzerland)
1	Carole Merle	France	566	51	60	100	100	100	55	100
2	Vreni Schneider	Switzerland	391	100	100	60	80	51	-	-
3	Diann Roffe	United States	372	60	40	55	55	60	51	51
4	Deborah Compagnoni	Italy	344	80	80	80	24	80	-	-
5	Pernilla Wiberg	Sweden	314	40	43	51	-	40	100	40
6	Ulrike Maier	Austria	256	43	24	47	40	47	-	55
7	Eva Twardokens	United States	251	26	51	37	60	55	-	22
8	Blanca Fernández Ochoa	Spain	238	3	55	18	18	4	60	80
9	Anita Wachter	Austria	225	37	37	14	26	31	80	-
10	Katja Seizinger	Germany	180	18	31	40	20	10	43	18

=== Slalom ===
see complete table

In Women's Slalom World Cup 1991/92 all results count. Vreni Schneider won her third Slalom World Cup.

Place	Name	Country	Total	1 (Austria)	2 (Austria)	10 (Austria)	12 (Austria)	14 (Slovenia)	20 (Switzerland)	23 (Norway)	24 (Sweden)
1	Vreni Schneider	Switzerland	511	100	80	-	80	100	-	100	51
2	Pernilla Wiberg	Sweden	445	-	55	43	47	60	80	80	80
3	Blanca Fernández Ochoa	Spain	413	60	100	80	34	37	-	55	47
4	Petra Kronberger	Austria	369	80	60	-	55	31	40	60	43
5	Annelise Coberger	New Zealand	335	-	26	60	100	55	60	-	34
6	Karin Buder	Austria	319	40	43	37	37	51	51	-	60
7	Monika Maierhofer	Austria	312	37	34	55	-	28	100	40	18
8	Julie Parisien	United States	262	51	-	51	60	-	-	-	100
9	Nataša Bokal	Slovenia	251	-	24	28	43	34	31	51	40
10	Claudia Strobl	Austria	244	55	51	-	-	-	55	43	40

=== Combined ===
In Women's Combined World Cup 1991/92 both results count.

Place	Name	Country	Total	11 (Austria)	21 (Switzerland)
1	Sabine Ginther	Austria	200	100	100
2	Miriam Vogt	Germany	115	55	60
3	Anita Wachter	Austria	106	51	55
4	Heidi Zurbriggen	Switzerland	97	60	37
5	Anja Haas	Austria	80	80	-
	Petra Kronberger	Austria	80	-	80
7	Regina Häusl	Germany	82	31	51
8	Gaby May	Switzerland	73	47	26
9	Emi Kawabata	Japan	53	37	16
10	Chantal Bournissen	Switzerland	47	-	47

== Nations Cup ==
=== Overall ===
Place	Country	Total	Men	Ladies
1	Austria	11028	4893	6135
2	Switzerland	10142	6685	3457
3	Germany	6047	2150	3897
4	Italy	5709	4454	1255
5	Norway	4461	3689	772
6	France	3792	1853	1939
7	United States	3230	1002	2228
8	Sweden	2391	1085	1306
9	Canada	1104	406	698
10	Luxembourg	996	996	0
11	Slovenia	757	101	656
12	Spain	657	0	657
13	Soviet Union/CIS	553	45	508
14	New Zealand	335	0	335
15	Japan	134	20	114
17	Czechoslovakia	100	29	71
18	Liechtenstein	44	44	0
19	United Kingdom	13	13	0
20	Finland	3	3	0
21	Chile	2	2	0

=== Men ===
Place	Country	Total	DH	SG	GS	SL	KB	Racers	Wins
1	Switzerland	6685	2126	1275	1522	1242	520	22	14
2	Austria	4893	1847	899	487	1105	555	27	1
3	Italy	4454	370	479	1438	1938	229	26	11
4	Norway	3689	691	892	714	1073	319	12	4
5	Germany	2150	707	310	328	640	165	10	1
6	France	1853	471	495	394	366	127	20	1
7	Sweden	1085	107	53	442	455	28	7	0
8	United States	1002	515	151	18	110	208	9	1
9	Luxembourg	996	182	296	210	228	80	1	1
10	Canada	406	315	8	0	20	63	9	0
12	Slovenia	101	0	0	67	34	0	3	0
13	Soviet Union/CIS	45	5	40	0	0	0	2	0
14	Liechtenstein	44	7	0	37	0	0	2	0
15	Czechoslovakia	29	0	0	0	0	29	1	0
16	Japan	20	0	0	0	20	0	2	0
17	United Kingdom	13	13	0	0	0	0	1	0
18	Finland	3	0	3	0	0	0	1	0
19	Chile	2	2	0	0	0	0	1	0

=== Ladies ===
Place	Country	Total	DH	SG	GS	SL	KB	Racers	Wins
1	Austria	6135	1310	1113	1142	2064	506	21	7
2	Germany	3897	1801	1093	736	70	197	15	4
3	Switzerland	3457	790	598	643	1165	261	20	6
4	United States	2228	375	500	766	490	97	13	1
5	France	1939	368	616	818	117	20	11	7
6	Sweden	1306	0	62	487	735	22	6	1
7	Italy	1255	18	217	567	410	43	9	1
8	Norway	772	188	362	115	73	34	5	1
9	Canada	698	357	257	44	0	40	6	0
10	Spain	657	0	6	238	413	0	1	1
11	Slovenia	656	0	0	80	536	40	7	0
12	Soviet Union/CIS	508	456	47	5	0	0	5	0
13	New Zealand	335	0	0	0	335	0	1	1
14	Japan	114	33	28	0	0	53	1	0
15	Czechoslovakia	71	22	7	0	0	42	2	0
