= 1992 Alpine Skiing World Cup – Men's super-G =

1992 Men's Super G World Cup
| Previous: 1991 | Next: 1993 |

Men's super G World Cup 1991/1992

== Calendar ==
| Round | Race No | Place | Country | Date | Winner | Second | Third |
|---|---|---|---|---|---|---|---|
| 1 | 6 | Val d'Isère | France | December 8, 1991 | (Luxembourg) Marc Girardelli | (Norway) Atle Skårdal | (Switzerland) Urs Kälin |
| 2 | 14 | Garmisch-Partenkirchen | Germany | January 12, 1992 | (Italy) Patrick Holzer | (Switzerland) Paul Accola | (Austria) Peter Rzehak |
| 3 | 25 | Megève | France | February 1, 1992 | (Switzerland) Paul Accola | (Switzerland) Marco Hangl | (Switzerland) Franz Heinzer |
| 4 | 27 | Morioka | Japan | March 1, 1992 | (Switzerland) Paul Accola | (Switzerland) Urs Kälin | (Norway) Jan Einar Thorsen |
| 5 | 30 | Panorama | Canada | March 8, 1992 | (Austria) Günther Mader | (Norway) Kjetil André Aamodt | (Luxembourg) Marc Girardelli |
| 6 | 32 | Aspen | United States | March 15, 1992 | (Norway) Kjetil André Aamodt | (Austria) Günther Mader | (Switzerland) Paul Accola |

== Final point standings ==
In men's super G World Cup 1991/92 all results count.

| Place | Name | Country | Total points | 6 (France) | 14 (Germany) | 25 (France) | 27 (Japan) | 30 (Canada) | 32 (United States) |
|---|---|---|---|---|---|---|---|---|---|
| 1 | Paul Accola | Switzerland | 429 | 55 | 80 | 100 | 100 | 34 | 60 |
| 2 | Marc Girardelli | Luxembourg | 296 | 100 | 24 | 47 | 55 | 60 | - |
| 3 | Günther Mader | Austria | 286 | 20 | 31 | 55 | - | 100 | 80 |
| 4 | Jan Einar Thorsen | Norway | 225 | 8 | 37 | 47 | 60 | 22 | 51 |
| 5 | Kjetil André Aamodt | Norway | 220 | - | - | 40 | - | 80 | 100 |
| 6 | Urs Kälin | Switzerland | 215 | 60 | - | 4 | 80 | 16 | 55 |
| 7 | Franz Heinzer | Switzerland | 193 | 47 | 4 | 60 | 51 | 31 | - |
| 8 | Ole Kristian Furuseth | Norway | 160 | 24 | - | 51 | 34 | 51 | - |
| 9 | Markus Wasmeier | Germany | 156 | 31 | 47 | 14 | 9 | 55 | - |
| 10 | Marco Hangl | Switzerland | 152 | 51 | - | 80 | - | 12 | 9 |
| 11 | Alberto Senigagliesi | Italy | 151 | 10 | 55 | - | 31 | 8 | 47 |
| 12 | Patrick Holzer | Italy | 137 | - | 100 | - | 37 | - | - |
| 13 | Hubert Strolz | Austria | 126 | - | - | 31 | 24 | 47 | 24 |
| 14 | Hans-Jörg Tauscher | Germany | 124 | 22 | 51 | - | 47 | 4 | - |
| 15 | Franck Piccard | France | 117 | 43 | - | 37 | - | 6 | 31 |
| 16 | Rainer Salzgeber | Austria | 115 | 34 | 16 | 20 | 5 | 40 | - |
| 17 | Daniel Mahrer | Switzerland | 109 | - | - | 34 | 47 | - | 28 |
| 18 | Patrick Ortlieb | Austria | 94 | 7 | - | 28 | - | 16 | 43 |
| 19 | Luc Alphand | France | 90 | 40 | - | - | 40 | - | 10 |
| | Jean-Luc Crétier | France | 90 | - | - | 26 | - | 24 | 40 |
| 21 | Peter Rzehak | Austria | 86 | 26 | 60 | - | - | - | - |
| 22 | Atle Skårdal | Norway | 80 | 80 | - | - | - | - | - |
| 23 | Leonhard Stock | Austria | 74 | - | - | - | 14 | 40 | 20 |
| 24 | Didrik Marksten | Norway | 73 | 16 | 14 | - | - | 43 | - |
| | Tom Stiansen | Norway | 73 | - | 40 | 5 | - | 28 | - |
| 26 | Josef Polig | Italy | 72 | 18 | 20 | 18 | - | - | 16 |
| 27 | Stephan Eberharter | Austria | 68 | 37 | - | 24 | - | 7 | - |
| 28 | Thierry Gentina | France | 66 | 4 | 28 | 3 | - | 9 | 22 |
| 29 | William Besse | Switzerland | 65 | - | - | 8 | 20 | - | 37 |
| 30 | Armand Schiele | France | 64 | 14 | 10 | 22 | - | - | 18 |
| 31 | Lasse Arnesen | Norway | 59 | - | 18 | 10 | 5 | - | 26 |
| 32 | Urs Lehmann | Switzerland | 57 | 14 | 43 | - | - | - | - |
| 33 | Armin Assinger | Austria | 50 | - | 24 | - | 26 | - | - |
| 34 | Jeff Olson | United States | 48 | - | - | - | 28 | 20 | - |
| 35 | Fredrik Nyberg | Sweden | 46 | 28 | - | 1 | 3 | - | 14 |
| 36 | A. J. Kitt | United States | 44 | - | - | - | 8 | 2 | 34 |
| 37 | Kyle Rasmussen | United States | 42 | - | - | - | 16 | 26 | - |
| 38 | Konstantin Chistyakov | Soviet Union | 40 | - | 28 | - | - | - | 12 |
| 39 | Kristian Ghedina | Italy | 33 | - | 5 | - | 18 | 10 | - |
| 40 | Adrien Duvillard | France | 29 | - | - | - | 10 | 18 | 1 |
| 41 | Danilo Sbardellotto | Italy | 27 | 3 | 24 | - | - | - | - |
| 42 | Bernhard Fahner | Switzerland | 25 | - | 9 | 9 | - | - | 7 |
| 43 | Alberto Tomba | Italy | 22 | - | - | - | 22 | - | - |
| 44 | Steve Locher | Switzerland | 21 | 5 | 8 | - | - | - | 8 |
| | Gianfranco Martin | Italy | 21 | 2 | - | 7 | 12 | - | - |
| 46 | Jérôme Noviant | France | 17 | - | - | 12 | - | - | 5 |
| | Hannes Zehentner | Germany | 17 | 1 | - | 16 | - | - | - |
| 48 | Attilio Barcella | Italy | 15 | 9 | 6 | - | - | - | - |
| 49 | Tommy Moe | United States | 14 | 6 | 8 | - | - | - | - |
| | David Pretot | France | 14 | - | 12 | 2 | - | - | - |
| 51 | Berni Huber | Germany | 13 | - | - | - | 6 | 3 | 4 |
| 52 | Daniel Brunner | Switzerland | 9 | - | - | - | 7 | 2 | - |
| 53 | Christophe Plé | France | 8 | - | - | - | 2 | - | 6 |
| 54 | Patrik Järbyn | Sweden | 6 | - | - | 6 | - | - | - |
| 55 | Cary Mullen | Canada | 5 | - | - | - | - | 5 | - |
| 56 | Janne Leskinen | Finland | 3 | - | 3 | - | - | - | - |
| | Reggie Crist | United States | 3 | - | - | - | - | - | 3 |
| | Roman Torn | Canada | 3 | - | - | - | 1 | - | 2 |
| 59 | Harald Christian Strand Nilsen | Norway | 2 | - | 2 | - | - | - | - |
| 60 | Sergio Bergamelli | Italy | 1 | - | 1 | - | - | - | - |
| | Niklas Henning | Sweden | 1 | - | 1 | - | - | - | - |

Alpine skiing World Cup
Men

Overall | Downhill | Super G | Giant slalom | Slalom | Combined

1992
