= 1992 Alpine Skiing World Cup – Men's slalom =

1992 Men's slalom World Cup
Previous: 1991	Next: 1993

Men's slalom World Cup 1991/1992

== Calendar ==
Round	Race No	Place	Country	Date	Winner	Second	Third
1	2	Park City	United States	November 24, 1991	(Italy) Alberto Tomba	(Switzerland) Paul Accola	(Italy) Konrad Ladstätter
2	4	Breckenridge	United States	November 30, 1991	(Switzerland) Paul Accola	(Italy) Alberto Tomba (Sweden) Thomas Fogdö
3	7	Sestriere	Italy	December 10, 1991	(Italy) Alberto Tomba	(Norway) Finn Christian Jagge	(Norway) Ole Kristian Furuseth
4	10	Madonna di Campiglio	Italy	December 17, 1991	(Norway) Finn Christian Jagge	(Italy) Alberto Tomba	(Sweden) Thomas Fogdö
5	12	Kranjska Gora	Slovenia	January 5, 1992	(Italy) Alberto Tomba	(Germany) Armin Bittner	(Norway) Finn Christian Jagge
6	15	Garmisch-Partenkirchen	Germany	January 13, 1992	(France) Patrice Bianchi	(Austria) Hubert Strolz	(Italy) Alberto Tomba
7	19	Kitzbühel	Austria	January 19, 1992	(Italy) Alberto Tomba	(France) Patrice Bianchi	(Germany) Armin Bittner
8	23	Wengen	Switzerland	January 26, 1992	(Italy) Alberto Tomba	(Switzerland) Paul Accola	(Germany) Armin Bittner
9	34	Crans Montana	Switzerland	March 22, 1992	(Italy) Alberto Tomba	(Switzerland) Paul Accola	(Norway) Finn Christian Jagge

== Final point standings ==
In men's slalom World Cup 1991/92 all results count.

Place	Name	Country	Total points	2 (United States)	4 (United States)	7 (Italy)	10 (Italy)	12 (Slovenia)	15 (Germany)	19 (Austria)	23 (Switzerland)	34 (Switzerland)
1	Alberto Tomba	Italy	820	100	80	100	80	100	60	100	100	100
2	Paul Accola	Switzerland	588	80	100	55	51	51	40	51	80	80
3	Finn Christian Jagge	Norway	533	51	55	80	100	60	37	43	47	60
4	Armin Bittner	Germany	375	55	-	37	-	80	43	60	60	40
5	Patrice Bianchi	France	293	40	24	31	18	-	100	80	-	-
6	Ole Kristian Furuseth	Norway	290	28	47	60	55	-	47	47	6	-
7	Carlo Gerosa	Italy	288	43	34	43	34	16	34	-	37	47
8	Patrick Staub	Switzerland	277	20	-	8	8	43	55	37	51	55
9	Hubert Strolz	Austria	265	-	10	40	12	-	80	55	40	28
10	Thomas Stangassinger	Austria	257	-	-	47	37	37	31	31	43	31
11	Fabio De Crignis	Italy	252	34	37	51	40	-	-	22	34	34
12	Marc Girardelli	Luxembourg	228	26	40	20	47	55	-	40	-	-
13	Peter Roth	West Germany	211	-	43	34	31	47	-	34	22	-
14	Thomas Fogdö	Sweden	196	-	80	-	60	-	51	-	5	-
15	Konrad Ladstätter	Italy	187	60	16	9	26	40	-	12	-	24
16	Bernhard Gstrein	Austria	184	47	51	-	4	26	28	-	28	-
17	Michael Tritscher	Austria	140	-	28	-	43	-	-	26	-	43
18	Richard Pramotton	Italy	139	6	-	-	9	34	22	28	-	40
19	Jonas Nilsson	Sweden	124	-	20	24	28	-	26	-	12	14
20	Michael von Grünigen	Switzerland	119	-	12	16	14	-	12	10	31	24
21	Günther Mader	Austria	97	31	9	28	22	-	-	-	7	-
22	Steve Locher	Switzerland	82	22	22	-	24	9	-	5	-	-
23	Matthew Grosjean	United States	78	37	31	-	-	-	-	-	10	-
24	Christian Polig	Italy	78	24	26	-	-	20	-	-	8	-
25	Fabrizio Tescari	Italy	74	-	-	22	-	14	9	20	9	-
26	Kjetil André Aamodt	Norway	72	-	-	-	-	-	20	-	26	26
27	Johan Wallner	Sweden	69	-	-	14	-	-	-	-	55	-
28	Christophe Berra	Switzerland	66	-	14	-	6	28	-	18	-	-
	Oliver Künzi	Switzerland	66	-	-	-	-	24	14	-	18	10
30	Lasse Kjus	Norway	65	-	-	-	-	-	-	-	14	51
31	Didrik Marksten	Norway	64	-	-	-	-	22	18	-	24	-
32	Mats Ericson	Sweden	58	-	20	18	20	-	-	-	-	-
33	Stephan Eberharter	Austria	54	-	-	-	5	18	24	7	-	-
	Bernhard Bauer	West Germany	54	12	7	-	7	-	-	8	20	-
35	Thomas Sykora	Austria	52	-	6	12	10	-	-	24	-	-
36	François Simond	France	44	18	-	10	-	-	-	16	-	-
37	Harald Christian Strand Nilsen	Norway	37	-	-	-	-	12	-	9	16	-
38	Roger Pramotton	Italy	31	-	-	-	-	31	-	-	-	-
39	Stéphane Exartier	France	29	16	-	5	-	-	8	-	-	-
	Hans Pieren	Switzerland	29	9	-	-	-	-	-	-	-	20
41	Roberto Spampatti	Italy	26	-	-	26	-	-	-	-	-	-
42	Jure Košir	Slovenia	25	5	-	-	-	7	-	6	-	7
43	Dietmar Thöni	Austria	24	-	8	-	-	-	16	-	-	-
44	Heinz Peter Platter	Italy	18	-	-	-	-	10	-	-	-	8
45	Angelo Weiss	Italy	18	-	-	-	-	-	-	-	-	18
	Jeremy Nobis	United States	17	10	-	7	-	-	-	-	-	-
47	Markus Eberle	Austria	16	-	-	-	16	-	-	-	-	-
	Siegfried Voglreiter	Austria	16	-	-	-	-	-	-	-	-	16
49	Joe Levins	United States	15	-	-	-	-	8	7	-	-	-
50	Alain Villiard	Canada	14	14	-	-	-	-	-	-	-	-
	Tetsuya Okabe	Japan	14	-	-	-	-	-	-	14	-	-
52	Espen Hellerud	Norway	12	-	-	-	-	-	-	-	-	12
53	Martin Knöri	Switzerland	10	-	-	-	-	-	10	-	-	-
54	Gregor Grilc	Slovenia	9	-	-	-	-	-	-	-	-	9
55	Fredrik Nyberg	Sweden	8	8	-	-	-	-	-	-	-	-
56	Matteo Belfrond	Italy	7	7	-	-	-	-	-	-	-	-
57	Takuya Ishioka	Japan	6	-	-	6	-	-	-	-	-	-
	Willy Raine	Canada	6	-	-	-	-	6	-	-	-	-
59	Benno Wicki	Switzerland	5	-	-	-	-	5	-	-	-	-

Alpine Skiing World Cup
Men

Overall | Downhill | Super G | Giant slalom | Slalom | Combined

1992
