= 1991 Alpine Skiing World Cup – Men's slalom =

1991 Men's slalom World Cup
Previous: 1990	Next: 1992

Men's slalom World Cup 1990/1991

== Calendar ==
Round	Race No	Place	Country	Date	Winner	Second	Third
1	1	Mount Hutt	New Zealand	August 8, 1990	(Germany) Peter Roth	(Austria) Michael Tritscher	(Italy) Alberto Tomba
2	5	Sestriere	Italy	December 11, 1990	(Italy) Alberto Tomba	(Norway) Ole Kristian Furuseth	(Austria) Rudolf Nierlich
3	9	Madonna di Campiglio	Italy	December 18, 1990	(Norway) Ole Kristian Furuseth	(Sweden) Thomas Fogdö	(Luxembourg) Marc Girardelli
4	11	Kranjska Gora	Yugoslavia	December 22, 1990	(Norway) Ole Kristian Furuseth	(Sweden) Thomas Fogdö	(Austria) Thomas Stangassinger
5	15	Kitzbühel	Austria	January 13, 1991	(Luxembourg) Marc Girardelli	(Norway) Ole Kristian Furuseth	(Austria) Rudolf Nierlich
6	18	Oppdal	Norway	February 26, 1991	(Austria) Rudolf Nierlich	(Switzerland) Paul Accola	(Luxembourg) Marc Girardelli
7	20	Hafjell-Lillehammer	Norway	March 2, 1991	(Austria) Michael Tritscher	(Austria) Thomas Stangassinger	(Switzerland) Paul Accola
8	23	Aspen	United States	March 10, 1991	(Austria) Rudolf Nierlich	(Sweden) Thomas Fogdö	(Italy) Fabio De Crignis
9	28	Waterville Valley	United States	March 23, 1991	(Sweden) Thomas Fogdö	(Austria) Rudolf Nierlich (Italy) Alberto Tomba

== Final point standings ==
In men's slalom World Cup 1990/91 all results count.

Place	Name	Country	Total points	1 (New Zealand)	5 (Italy)	9 (Italy)	11 (Socialist Federal Republic of Yugoslavia)	15 (Austria)	18 (Norway)	20 (Norway)	23 (United States)	28 (United States)
1	Marc Girardelli	Luxembourg	110	7	12	15	12	25	15	12	12	-
2	Ole Kristian Furuseth	Norway	102	3	20	25	25	20	-	-	9	-
3	Rudolf Nierlich	Austria	100	-	15	-	-	15	25	-	25	20
4	Thomas Fogdö	Sweden	95	-	10	20	20	-	-	-	20	25
5	Thomas Stangassinger	Austria	80	10	-	12	15	8	8	20	7	-
6	Alberto Tomba	Italy	70	15	25	-	-	-	-	-	10	20
7	Paul Accola	Switzerland	67	11	-	2	7	-	20	15	-	12
8	Michael Tritscher	Austria	64	20	-	11	-	-	-	25	8	-
9	Armin Bittner	Germany	62	6	11	-	9	12	10	-	5	9
10	Mats Ericson	Sweden	56	-	-	9	8	10	-	10	11	8
11	Bernhard Gstrein	Austria	48	8	7	10	-	9	5	-	6	3
12	Peter Roth	Germany	46	25	9	-	-	-	-	4	3	5
13	Lasse Kjus	Norway	42	-	8	7	-	4	12	-	-	11
14	Fabio De Crignis	Italy	37	12	-	-	-	-	-	3	15	7
15	Günther Mader	Austria	36	-	5	-	10	7	4	6	4	-
16	Tetsuya Okabe	Japan	29	-	-	-	11	11	7	-	-	-
17	Jonas Nilsson	Sweden	27	2	-	-	5	1	-	8	1	10
18	Carlo Gerosa	Italy	26	-	-	1	3	-	11	11	-	-
19	Konrad Ladstätter	Italy	25	9	6	6	4	-	-	-	-	-
20	Kjetil André Aamodt	Norway	16	-	-	-	1	6	-	9	-	-
21	Josef Polig	Italy	11	-	-	9	-	-	-	2	-	-
	Finn Christian Jagge	Norway	11	-	1	-	-	4	-	-	-	6
23	Michael von Grünigen	Switzerland	10	4	-	-	6	-	-	-	-	-
	Hubert Strolz	Austria	10	-	4	-	-	-	-	6	-	-
25	Stephan Eberharter	Austria	9	-	-	-	-	-	9	-	-	-
	François Simond	France	9	-	-	-	-	-	-	7	-	2
27	Patrice Bianchi	France	8	-	-	5	-	-	-	-	2	1
28	Johan Wallner	Sweden	7	-	3	4	-	-	-	-	-	-
29	Christian Polig	Italy	6	-	-	-	-	-	6	-	-	-
30	Alain Villiard	Canada	5	5	-	-	-	-	-	-	-	-
	Roberto Spampatti	Italy	5	-	-	-	-	5	-	-	-	-
32	Christophe Berra	Switzerland	4	-	-	-	-	-	-	-	-	4
33	Heinz Peter Platter	Italy	3	-	-	3	-	-	-	-	-	-
	Harald Christian Strand Nilsen	Norway	3	-	-	-	-	-	3	-	-	-
35	Alain Feutrier	France	2	-	2	-	-	-	-	-	-	-
	Oliver Künzi	Switzerland	2	-	-	-	2	-	-	-	-	-
	Richard Pramotton	Italy	2	-	-	-	-	2	-	-	-	-
	Roger Pramotton	Italy	2	-	-	-	-	-	2	-	-	-
39	Giovanni Moro	Italy	1	1	-	-	-	-	-	-	-	-
	Patrick Staub	Switzerland	1	-	-	-	-	-	1	-	-	-
	Bernhard Bauer	Germany	1	-	-	-	-	-	-	1	-	-

== Men's slalom team results ==
bold indicate highest score - italics indicate race wins

Place	Country	Total points	1 (New Zealand)	5 (Italy)	9 (Italy)	11 (Socialist Federal Republic of Yugoslavia)	15 (Austria)	18 (Norway)	20 (Norway)	23 (United States)	28 (United States)	Racers	Wins
1	Austria	347	38	31	33	25	39	51	**57**	50	23	7	3
2	Italy	188	37	31	19	7	7	19	16	25	27	11	1
3	Sweden	185	2	13	33	33	11	-	18	32	43	4	1
4	Norway	174	3	29	32	26	34	15	9	9	17	5	2
5	Luxembourg	110	7	12	15	12	25	15	12	12	-	1	1
6	Germany	109	31	20	-	9	12	10	5	8	14	3	1
7	Switzerland	84	15	-	2	15	-	21	15	-	16	5	0
8	Japan	29	-	-	-	11	11	7	-	-	-	1	0
9	France	19	-	2	5	-	-	-	7	2	3	3	0
10	Canada	5	5	-	-	-	-	-	-	-	-	1	0

**Alpine Skiing World Cup**
**Men**

Overall | Downhill | Super G | Giant slalom | **Slalom** | Combined

**1991**
