= 1991 Alpine Skiing World Cup – Men's giant slalom =

1991 Men's giant slalom World Cup
Previous: 1990	Next: 1992

Men's giant slalom World Cup 1990/1991

== Calendar ==
Round	Race No	Place	Country	Date	Winner	Second	Third
1	2	Mount Hutt	New Zealand	August 9, 1990	(Sweden) Fredrik Nyberg	(Norway) Lasse Kjus	(France) Franck Piccard
2	8	Alta Badia	Italy	December 16, 1990	(Italy) Alberto Tomba	(Switzerland) Urs Kälin	(Luxembourg) Marc Girardelli
3	10	Kranjska Gora	Yugoslavia	December 21, 1990	(Italy) Alberto Tomba	(Switzerland) Urs Kälin	(Luxembourg) Marc Girardelli
4	17	Adelboden	Switzerland	January 15, 1991	(Luxembourg) Marc Girardelli	(Italy) Alberto Tomba	(Austria) Rudolf Nierlich
5	19	Hafjell-Lillehammer	Norway	March 1, 1991	(Italy) Alberto Tomba	(Austria) Rudolf Nierlich	(Austria) Stephan Eberharter
6	22	Aspen	United States	March 9, 1991	(Italy) Alberto Tomba	(Austria) Rudolf Nierlich	(Luxembourg) Marc Girardelli
7	27	Waterville Valley	United States	March 21, 1991	(Italy) Alberto Tomba	(Norway) Ole Kristian Furuseth	(Austria) Rudolf Nierlich

== Final point standings ==
In men's giant slalom World Cup 1990/91 all results count.

Place	Name	Country	Total points	2 (New Zealand)	8 (Italy)	10 (Socialist Federal Republic of Yugoslavia)	17 (Switzerland)	19 (Norway)	22 (United States)	27 (United States)
1	Alberto Tomba	Italy	152	7	25	25	20	25	25	25
2	Rudolf Nierlich	Austria	101	8	11	12	15	20	20	15
3	Marc Girardelli	Luxembourg	84	2	15	15	25	12	15	-
4	Urs Kälin	Switzerland	64	4	20	20	7	8	3	2
5	Fredrik Nyberg	Sweden	52	25	12	10	5	-	-	-
6	Ole Kristian Furuseth	Norway	44	5	-	-	4	7	8	20
7	Stephan Eberharter	Austria	35	-	8	-	-	15	12	-
	Günther Mader	Austria	35	-	10	3	11	-	11	-
9	Johan Wallner	Sweden	34	10	7	-	3	-	2	12
10	Kjetil André Aamodt	Norway	32	9	5	1	8	5	4	-
11	Lasse Kjus	Norway	30	20	-	-	-	-	10	-
	Rainer Salzgeber	Austria	30	-	-	5	2	6	7	10
13	Franck Piccard	France	28	15	3	6	-	-	-	4
14	Martin Knöri	Switzerland	27	-	2	11	6	-	-	8
15	Paul Accola	Switzerland	22	-	-	-	12	10	-	-
	Konrad Walk	Austria	22	-	9	7	-	-	6	-
17	Mitja Kunc	Yugoslavia	20	-	-	-	-	-	9	11
	Hans Pieren	Switzerland	20	-	6	4	1	-	-	9
19	Patrick Holzer	Italy	16	-	-	-	-	11	5	-
20	Armin Bittner	Germany	15	12	-	-	-	3	-	-
21	Michael von Grünigen	Switzerland	14	1	1	2	10	-	-	-
22	Hubert Strolz	Austria	12	-	4	8	-	-	-	-
	Jeremy Nobis	United States	12	-	-	-	9	-	-	3
24	Lars-Börje Eriksson	Sweden	11	11	-	-	-	-	-	-
25	Helmut Mayer	Austria	10	-	-	9	-	1	-	-
26	Steve Locher	Switzerland	9	-	-	-	-	9	-	-
27	Luca Pesando	Italy	8	7	-	-	-	-	-	1
28	Josef Polig	Italy	7	-	-	-	-	-	-	7
29	Alain Feutrier	France	6	-	-	-	-	-	-	6
30	Richard Pramotton	Italy	5	-	-	-	-	-	-	5
31	Mats Ericson	Sweden	4	-	-	-	-	4	-	-
32	Kristian Ghedina	Italy	3	3	-	-	-	-	-	-
33	Roberto Spampatti	Italy	2	-	-	-	-	2	-	-
34	Michael Tritscher	Austria	1	-	-	-	-	-	1	-

== Men's giant slalom team results ==
bold indicate highest score - italics indicate race wins

Place	Country	Total points	2 (New Zealand)	8 (Italy)	10 (Socialist Federal Republic of Yugoslavia)	17 (Switzerland)	19 (Norway)	22 (United States)	27 (United States)	Racers	Wins
1	Austria	246	8	42	44	28	42	**57**	25	8	0
2	Italy	193	17	25	25	20	38	30	38	7	5
3	Switzerland	156	5	29	37	36	27	3	19	6	0
4	Norway	106	34	5	1	12	12	22	20	3	0
5	Sweden	101	46	19	10	8	4	2	12	4	1
6	Luxembourg	84	2	15	15	25	12	15	-	1	0
7	France	34	15	3	6	-	-	-	10	2	0
8	Yugoslavia	20	-	-	-	-	-	9	11	1	0
9	Germany	15	12	-	-	-	3	-	-	1	0
10	United States	12	-	-	-	9	-	-	3	1	0

**Alpine Skiing World Cup**
**Men**

Overall | Downhill | Super G | **Giant slalom** | Slalom | Combined

**1991**
