= Gran Risa =

World Cup giant slalom ski course in Italy

- Interactive map of Gran Risa
- Location within Northern Italy
- 46°34′34″N 11°55′1″E
- Location: Alta Badia, Italy
- Mountain: Piz La Ila, Dolomites
- Opened: 1966 (for tourism); 1985 (World Cup)
- Member: Club5+
- Level: expert

Giant slalom
- Start: 1,868 m (6,129 ft) (AA)
- Finish: 1,420 m (4,659 ft)
- Vertical drop: 448 m (1,470 ft)
- Length: 1.225 km (0.76 mi)
- Max incline: 34.6 degrees (69%)
- Avg incline: 24.7 degrees (46%)

Gran Risa is a World Cup giant slalom ski course in Italy at Alta Badia. On Piz La Ila mountain in the Dolomites, it hosted its first World Cup event in 1985.

This slope is considered one of the three most demanding giant slalom courses on the World Cup circuit, along with Kranjska Gora (SLO) and Adelboden (SUI).

== Course ==
The men's World Cup giant slalom was held on the Gran Risa for the first time in 1985, and every year since 1990 (usually in mid-December). From 2006 to 2011, World Cup slaloms also took place on the Gran Risa.

Since 2015, the Gran Risa has also been the venue for World Cup parallel giant slaloms. Women's giant slaloms have only been held twice so far, in 1994 and 2003. The record winner is Marcel Hirscher with six giant slalom victories, with additional wins in slalom and parallel giant slalom.

=== Sections ===
- Pump Station
- Col Frata
- La sTreta
- La Curva Calait
- Plans

== World Cup ==
This course hosted a total of 49 men's World Cup events (11th of all-time) and total 2 for ladies (108th of all-time).

The elevation at the start of the men's giant slalom is 1,868 metres (6,129 ft), with a vertical drop of 448 m (1,470 ft). It has a maximum incline of 34.6 degrees (69%) and the average gradient is 19.8 degrees (36%).

Marcel Hirscher (AUT)	Gran Risa
300x	300x
Won record 6 giant slaloms	One of the slope sections

=== Men ===
No.	Type	Season	Date	Winner	Second	Third
529	GS	1985/86	15 December 1985	(Sweden) Ingemar Stenmark	(Austria) Hubert Strolz	(Italy) Roberto Erlacher
530	KB	1985/86	14 December 1985; Val Gardena (DH) ---------------------------- 15 December 1985; Alta Badia (GS)	(Luxembourg) Marc Girardelli	(Sweden) Niklas Henning	(Switzerland) Pirmin Zurbriggen
576	GS	1986/87	14 December 1986	(Italy) Richard Pramotton	(Italy) Alberto Tomba	(Italy) Oswald Totsch
577	GS	1986/87	15 December 1986	(Switzerland) Joël Gaspoz	(Italy) Richard Pramotton	(West Germany) Markus Wasmeier
607	GS	1987/88	13 December 1987	(Italy) Alberto Tomba	(Austria) Rudolf Nierlich	(Switzerland) Joël Gaspoz (Switzerland) Hans Pieren
679	GS	1989/90	14 January 1990	(Austria) Richard Kröll	(Austria) Günther Mader	(Austria) Hubert Strolz (Austria) Rudolf Nierlich
705	GS	1990/91	16 December 1990	(Italy) Alberto Tomba	(Switzerland) Urs Kälin	(Luxembourg) Marc Girardelli
734	GS	1991/92	15 December 1991	(Italy) Alberto Tomba	(Switzerland) Steve Locher	(Switzerland) Paul Accola
766	GS	1992/93	13 December 1992	(Luxembourg) Marc Girardelli	(France) Alain Feutrier	(Italy) Alberto Tomba
803	GS	1993/94	19 December 1993	(Switzerland) Steve Locher	(Italy) Alberto Tomba	(Austria) Christian Mayer
838	GS	1994/95	22 December 1994	(Italy) Alberto Tomba	(Switzerland) Urs Kälin	(Austria) Christian Mayer
871	GS	1995/96	17 December 1995	(Austria) Hans Knauß	(Switzerland) Michael von Grünigen	(Italy) Alberto Tomba
906	GS	1996/97	22 December 1996	(Switzerland) Michael von Grünigen	(Switzerland) Steve Locher	(Italy) Matteo Nana
942	GS	1997/98	21 December 1997	(Austria) Christian Mayer	(Switzerland) Michael von Grünigen	(Austria) Hermann Maier
980	GS	1998/99	20 December 1998	(Switzerland) Michael von Grünigen	(Italy) Patrick Holzer	(Austria) Andreas Schifferer
1015	GS	1999/00	19 December 1999	(France) Joël Chenal	(Austria) Hermann Maier	(Austria) Rainer Salzgeber
	GS	2000/01	17 December 2000	cancelled		
1087	GS	2001/02	16 December 2001	(France) Frédéric Covili	(Switzerland) Michael von Grünigen	(Finland) Sami Uotila
1125	GS	2002/03	22 December 2002	(United States) Bode Miller	(Italy) Davide Simoncelli	(Austria) Christian Mayer
1158	GS	2003/04	14 December 2003	(Finland) Kalle Palander	(Italy) Davide Simoncelli	(France) Frédéric Covili
1201	GS	2004/05	19 December 2004	(Canada) Thomas Grandi	(Austria) Benjamin Raich	(Switzerland) Didier Cuche (Austria) Hermann Maier
1237	GS	2005/06	18 December 2005	(Italy) Massimiliano Blardone	(Italy) Davide Simoncelli	(Canada) François Bourque
1272	GS	2006/07	17 December 2006	(Finland) Kalle Palander	(United States) Bode Miller	(Switzerland) Didier Défago
1273	SL	2006/07	18 December 2006	(Sweden) Markus Larsson	(United States) Ted Ligety	(Croatia) Ivica Kostelić
1310	GS	2007/08	16 December 2007	(Finland) Kalle Palander	(Austria) Benjamin Raich	(Switzerland) Marc Berthod
1311	SL	2007/08	17 December 2007	(France) Jean-Baptiste Grange	(Germany) Felix Neureuther	(United States) Ted Ligety
1349	GS	2008/09	21 December 2008	(Switzerland) Daniel Albrecht	(Croatia) Ivica Kostelić	(Austria) Hannes Reichelt
1350	SL	2008/09	22 December 2008	(Croatia) Ivica Kostelić	(France) Jean-Baptiste Grange	(Austria) Benjamin Raich
1386	GS	2009/10	20 December 2009	(Italy) Massimiliano Blardone	(Italy) Davide Simoncelli	(France) Cyprien Richard
1387	SL	2009/10	21 December 2009	(Austria) Reinfried Herbst	(Switzerland) Silvan Zurbriggen	(Austria) Manfred Pranger
1417	GS	2010/11	19 December 2010	(United States) Ted Ligety	(France) Cyprien Richard	(France) Thomas Fanara
1453	GS	2011/12	18 December 2011	(Italy) Massimiliano Blardone	(Austria) Hannes Reichelt	(Austria) Philipp Schörghofer
1454	SL	2011/12	19 December 2011	(Austria) Marcel Hirscher	(Italy) Giuliano Razzoli	(Germany) Felix Neureuther
1499	GS	2012/13	16 December 2012	(United States) Ted Ligety	(Austria) Marcel Hirscher	(France) Thomas Fanara
1533	GS	2013/14	22 December 2013	(Austria) Marcel Hirscher	(France) Alexis Pinturault	(United States) Ted Ligety
1567	GS	2014/15	21 December 2014	(Austria) Marcel Hirscher	(United States) Ted Ligety	(France) Thomas Fanara
1603	GS	2015/16	20 December 2015	(Austria) Marcel Hirscher	(Norway) Henrik Kristoffersen	(France) Victor Muffat-Jeandet
1604	PG	2015/16	21 December 2015	(Norway) Kjetil Jansrud	(Norway) Aksel Lund Svindal	(Sweden) André Myhrer
1646	GS	2016/17	18 December 2016	(Austria) Marcel Hirscher	(France) Mathieu Faivre	(Italy) Florian Eisath
1647	PG	2016/17	19 December 2016	(France) Cyprien Sarrazin	(Switzerland) Carlo Janka	(Norway) Kjetil Jansrud
1683	GS	2017/18	17 December 2017	(Austria) Marcel Hirscher	(Norway) Henrik Kristoffersen	(Slovenia) Žan Kranjec
1684	PG	2017/18	18 December 2017	(Sweden) Matts Olsson	(Norway) Henrik Kristoffersen	(Austria) Marcel Hirscher
1718	GS	2018/19	16 December 2018	(Austria) Marcel Hirscher	(France) Thomas Fanara	(France) Alexis Pinturault
1719	PG	2018/19	17 December 2018	(Austria) Marcel Hirscher	(France) Thibaut Favrot	(France) Alexis Pinturault
1756	GS	2019/20	22 December 2019	(Norway) Henrik Kristoffersen	(France) Cyprien Sarrazin	(Slovenia) Žan Kranjec
1757	PG	2019/20	23 December 2019	(Norway) Rasmus Windingstad	(Germany) Stefan Luitz	(Austria) Roland Leitinger
1791	GS	2020/21	20 December 2020	(France) Alexis Pinturault	(Norway) Atle Lie McGrath	(Switzerland) Justin Murisier
1792	SL	2020/21	21 December 2020	(Switzerland) Ramon Zenhäusern	(Austria) Manuel Feller	(Austria) Marco Schwarz
1828	GS	2021/22	19 December 2021	(Norway) Henrik Kristoffersen	(Switzerland) Marco Odermatt	(Austria) Manuel Feller
1829	GS	2021/22	20 December 2021	(Switzerland) Marco Odermatt	(Italy) Luca De Aliprandini	(Germany) Alexander Schmid
1864	GS	2022/23	18 December 2022	(Norway) Lucas Braathen	(Norway) Henrik Kristoffersen	(Switzerland) Marco Odermatt
1865	GS	2022/23	19 December 2022	(Switzerland) Marco Odermatt	(Norway) Henrik Kristoffersen	(Slovenia) Žan Kranjec
1898	GS	2023/24	17 December 2023	(Switzerland) Marco Odermatt	(Croatia) Filip Zubčić	(Slovenia) Žan Kranjec
1899	GS	2023/24	18 December 2023	(Switzerland) Marco Odermatt	(Austria) Marco Schwarz	(Slovenia) Žan Kranjec
1938	GS	2024/25	22 December 2024	(Switzerland) Marco Odermatt	(France) Léo Anguenot	(Norway) Alexander Steen Olsen
1939	SL	2024/25	23 December 2024	(Norway) Timon Haugan	(Switzerland) Loïc Meillard	(Norway) Atle Lie McGrath
1978	GS	2025/26	21 December 2025	(Austria) Marco Schwarz	(Brazil) Lucas Pinheiro Braathen	(Austria) Stefan Brennsteiner
1979	SL	2025/26	22 December 2025	(Norway) Atle Lie McGrath	(France) Clément Noël	(Switzerland) Loïc Meillard

=== Women ===
No.	Type	Season	Date	Winner	Second	Third
838	GS	1994/95	21 December 1994	(Italy) Sabina Panzanini	(Austria) Anita Wachter	(Italy) Deborah Compagnoni
1084	GS	2003/04	13 December 2003	(Italy) Denise Karbon	(Austria) Nicole Hosp	(Austria) Elisabeth Görgl

== Club5+ ==
In 1986, elite Club5 was originally founded by prestigious classic downhill organizers: Kitzbühel, Wengen, Garmisch, Val d’Isère and Val Gardena/Gröden, with goal to bring alpine ski sport on the highest levels possible.

Later over the years other classic long-term organizers joined the now named Club5+: Alta Badia, Cortina, Kranjska Gora, Maribor, Lake Louise, Schladming, Adelboden, Kvitfjell, St.Moritz and Åre.
