= 1992 Alpine Skiing World Cup – Men's combined =

1992 Men's combined World Cup
Previous: 1991	Next: 1993

Men's combined World Cup 1991/1992

== Final point standings ==
In men's combined World Cup 1991/92 all three results count.

Place	Name	Country	Total points	16 (Germany)	20 (Austria)	24 (Switzerland)
1	Paul Accola	Switzerland	300	100	100	100
2	Hubert Strolz	Austria	180	60	60	60
3	Markus Wasmeier	Germany	141	51	47	43
4	Josef Polig	Italy	112	47	51	14
5	Stephan Eberharter	Austria	110	55	55	-
6	Ole Kristian Furuseth	Norway	104	80	-	24
7	Rainer Salzgeber	Austria	99	37	31	31
8	A. J. Kitt	United States	89	40	37	12
9	Lasse Arnesen	Norway	85	34	-	51
10	Steve Locher	Switzerland	83	43	40	-
11	Marc Girardelli	Luxembourg	80	-	80	-
	Günther Mader	Austria	80	-	-	80
13	Jean-Luc Crétier	France	67	12	18	37
14	Xavier Gigandet	Switzerland	65	22	43	-
15	Adrien Duvillard	France	60	-	26	34
16	Gianfranco Martin	Italy	57	31	-	26
17	Kjetil André Aamodt	Norway	55	-	-	55
18	Patrick Ortlieb	Austria	50	16	34	-
19	Harald Christian Strand Nilsen	Norway	47	-	-	47
20	Roman Torn	Canada	43	7	16	20
21	Daniel Brunner	Switzerland	40	-	-	40
22	Lukas Perathoner	Italy	34	-	24	10
	Kyle Rasmussen	United States	34	18	-	16
24	Jeff Olson	United States	30	-	22	8
25	Marian Bíreš	Czechoslovakia	29	9	20	-
26	Fredrik Nyberg	Sweden	28	28	-	-
	Jan Einar Thorsen	Norway	28	-	28	-
	Peter Wirnsberger II	Austria	28	-	-	28
29	Kristian Ghedina	Italy	26	26	-	-
30	Hans-Jörg Tauscher	Germany	24	24	-	-
31	Tommy Moe	United States	23	14	-	9
32	Bruno Kernen	Switzerland	22	-	-	22
33	Cary Mullen	Canada	20	20	-	-
34	Bill Hudson	United States	18	-	-	18
35	Reggie Crist	United States	14	-	14	-
36	William Besse	Switzerland	10	10	-	-
37	Michael Haas	Austria	8	8	-	-

Note:

In all races not all points were awarded (not enough finishers).

Alpine Skiing World Cup
Men

Overall | Downhill | Super G | Giant slalom | Slalom | Combined

1992
