= Canalone Miramonti =

World Cup slalom ski course in Italy

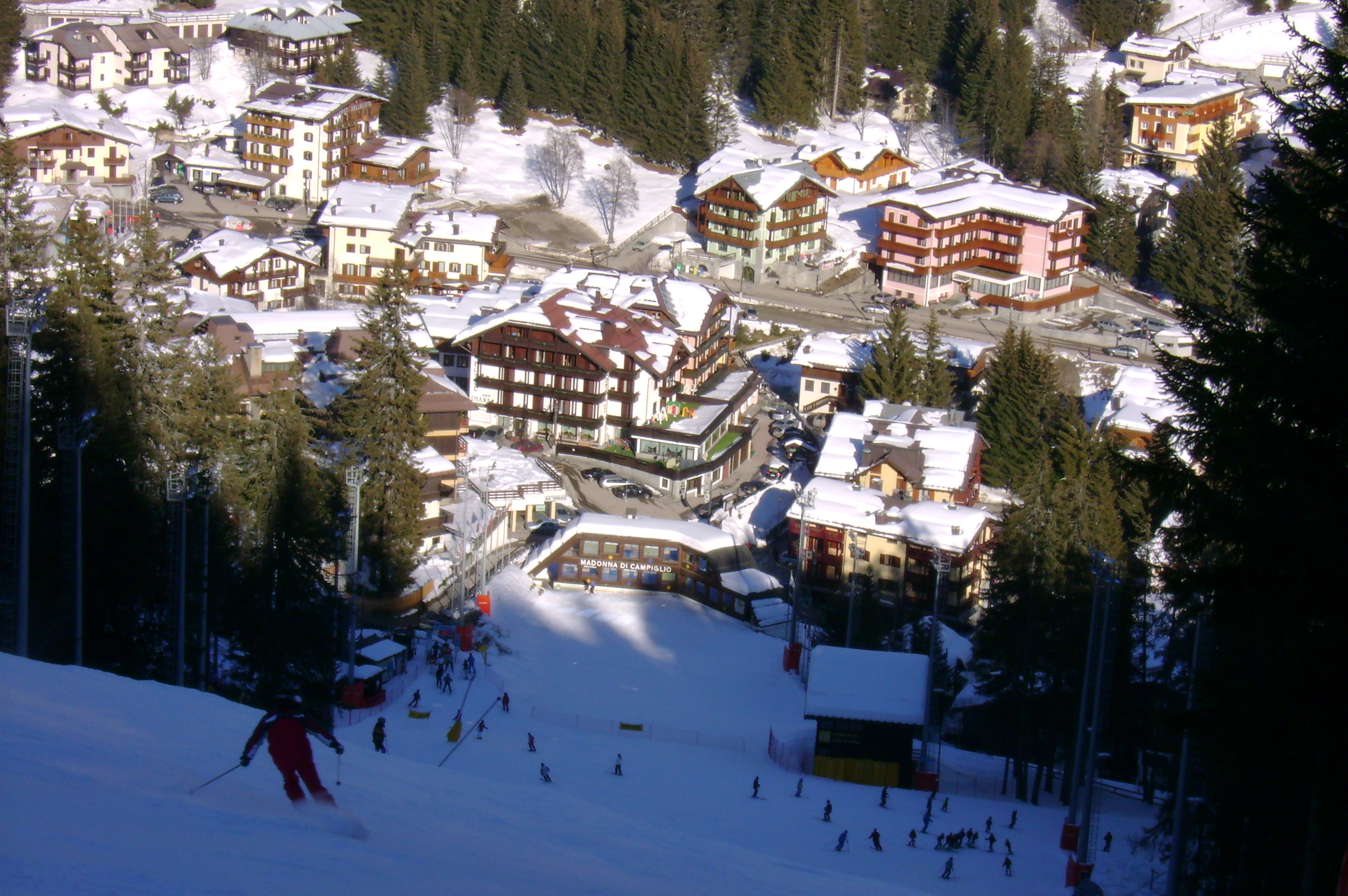
- Interactive map of Canalone Miramonti
- 46°13′52″N 10°49′19″E
- Location: Madonna di Campiglio, Trentino, Italy
- Opened: 1940
- Architect: Bruno Detassis (ITA)
- Level: expert
- Competition: 3-Tre

Slalom
- Start: 1,733 m (5,686 ft) (AA)
- Finish: 1,550 m (5,085 ft)
- Vertical drop: 183 m (600 ft)
- Length: 470 m (1,541.99 ft)

Canalone Miramonti is a World Cup slalom ski course in Italy, in Madonna di Campiglio, Trentino.

The course was designed by Italian Bruno Detassis in 1940. It is known as a slalom World Cup classic, being one of the oldest, the most demanding and one of the most prestigious slaloms in the world.

The slope has maximum incline at 31 degrees (60%), average incline at 27% and minimum incline at 18%.

== History ==
In 1940, Italian mountaineer and mountain guide Bruno Detassis (known as King of the Brenta), designed and constructed this famous slalom slope, which was altered a few times across the years. It is the final part of a longer slope known as 3-Tre, from the name of a skiing competition (3 gare in Trentino, three races in Trentino South-Tyrol) that was run since 1950 in the region and, from 1957, permanently at Campiglio (with the exception of 1961).

When the Alpine Skiing World Cup was established in 1967 it became a staple of the calendar, hosting several disciplines including downhill, super-G, giant slalom, slalom, and apline combined. Since 1986 slalom was the only discipline hosted, and the upper part of the 3-Tre became unused in international competitions.

Traditionally, the competitions hosted were reserved for men. One-off races for women were held in 1977 (GS), 1984 (GS, SL), and 2003 (two SL).

Swedish skier Ingemar Stenmark holds the record for slalom wins at the venue, with 5 victories.

Location in Italy

== 3-Tre events ==
Bruno Detassis (ITA)	Ingemar Stenmark (SWE)	Lucas Pinheiro Braathen (BRA)
300x		300x
the course architect	Won record 5 slaloms	First Brazilian medalist at Olympics

=== World Cup ===
No.	Type	Season	Date	Winner	Second	Third
10	SL	1967	5 February 1967	(France) Guy Périllat	(France) Louis Jauffret	(France) Léo Lacroix
	SL	1967/68	1968	lack of snow		
75	SL	1969/70	31 January 1970	(France) Henri Bréchu	(Italy) Gustav Thöni	(Switzerland) Dumeng Giovanoli
94	SL	1970/71	10 January 1971	(Italy) Gustav Thöni	(France) Jean-Noël Augert	(France) Patrick Russel
130	SL	1971/72	17 March 1972	(Italy) Roland Thöni	(France) Alain Penz	(Poland) Andrzej Bachleda
136	SL	1972/73	17 December 1972	(Italy) Piero Gros	(Italy) Gustav Thöni	(West Germany) Christian Neureuther
	SL	1973/74	December 1973	lack of snow		
181	SL	1974/75	17 December 1974	(Sweden) Ingemar Stenmark	(Italy) Paolo De Chiesa	(Italy) Fausto Radici
234	SL	1976/77	19 December 1976	(Italy) Fausto Radici	(Italy) Piero Gros	(Italy) Gustav Thöni
265	SL	1977/78	13 December 1977	(Sweden) Ingemar Stenmark	(Austria) Klaus Heidegger	(Socialist Federal Republic of Yugoslavia) Bojan Križaj
288	SL	1978/79	13 December 1978	(Switzerland) Martial Donnet	(Switzerland) Peter Lüscher	(West Germany) Christian Neureuther
NC	PS	1978/79	14 December 1978	(Sweden) Ingemar Stenmark	(Italy) Mauro Bernardi	(Italy) Karl Trojer
321	SL	1979/80	11 December 1979	(Sweden) Ingemar Stenmark	(Socialist Federal Republic of Yugoslavia) Bojan Križaj	(Liechtenstein) Paul Frommelt
324	KB	1979/80	11 December 1979; Madonna di Cam. (SL) ------------------------- 17 December 1979; Val Gardena (DH)	(Switzerland) Peter Lüscher	(Liechtenstein) Andreas Wenzel	(Austria) Anton Steiner
346	SL	1980/81	9 December 1980	(Sweden) Ingemar Stenmark	(Liechtenstein) Paul Frommelt	(Socialist Federal Republic of Yugoslavia) Bojan Križaj
349	KB	1980/81	9 December 1980; Madonna di Cam. (SL) ------------------------- 14 December 1980; Val Gardena (DH)	(Switzerland) Peter Müller	(Austria) Leonhard Stock	(Liechtenstein) Andreas Wenzel
384	SL	1981/82	9 December 1981	(United States) Phil Mahre	(Sweden) Ingemar Stenmark	(Italy) Paolo De Chiesa
386	KB	1981/82	9 December 1981; Madonna di Cam. (SL) ------------------------- 13 December 1981; Val Gardena (DH)	(United States) Phil Mahre	(Liechtenstein) Andreas Wenzel	(Norway) Even Hole
420	SL	1982/83	21 December 1982	(Sweden) Stig Strand	(Sweden) Ingemar Stenmark	(United States) Phil Mahre
460	SL	1983/84	20 December 1983	(Sweden) Ingemar Stenmark	(Austria) Robert Zoller	(Bulgaria) Petăr Popangelov
461	KB	1983/84	19 December 1983; Val Gardena (SG) ------------------------- 20 December 1983; Madonna di Cam. (SL)	(Liechtenstein) Andreas Wenzel	(Switzerland) Thomas Bürgler	(Italy) Alex Giorgi
494	SL	1984/85	16 December 1984	(Socialist Federal Republic of Yugoslavia) Bojan Križaj	(Liechtenstein) Andreas Wenzel	(Bulgaria) Petăr Popangelov
496	KB	1984/85	16 December 1984; Madonna di Cam. (SL) ------------------------- 17 December 1984; Madonna di Cam. (SG)	(Liechtenstein) Andreas Wenzel	(Austria) Thomas Stangassinger	(Switzerland) Max Julen
531	SL	1985/86	16 December 1985	(Sweden) Jonas Nilsson	(Socialist Federal Republic of Yugoslavia) Bojan Križaj	(Liechtenstein) Paul Frommelt
578	SL	1986/87	16 December 1986	(Italy) Ivano Edalini	(Sweden) Ingemar Stenmark	(Switzerland) Joël Gaspoz
608	SL	1987/88	16 December 1987	(Italy) Alberto Tomba	(Austria) Rudolf Nierlich	(Socialist Federal Republic of Yugoslavia) Bojan Križaj
638	SL	1988/89	11 December 1988	(Italy) Alberto Tomba	(Luxembourg) Marc Girardelli	(Austria) Michael Tritscher
	SL	1989/90	December 1989	lack of snow		
706	SL	1990/91	18 December 1990	(Norway) Ole Kristian Furuseth	(Sweden) Thomas Fogdö	(Luxembourg) Marc Girardelli
735	SL	1991/92	17 December 1991	(Norway) Finn Christian Jagge	(Italy) Alberto Tomba	(Sweden) Thomas Fogdö
767	SL	1992/93	15 December 1992	(France) Patrice Bianchi	(Italy) Alberto Tomba	(Austria) Thomas Sykora
804	SL	1993/94	20 December 1993	(Slovenia) Jure Košir	(Italy) Alberto Tomba	(Norway) Finn Christian Jagge
	SL	1994/95	December 1994	lack of snow		
872	SL	1995/96	19 December 1995	(Italy) Alberto Tomba	(France) Yves Dimier	(Italy) Konrad Kurt Ladstätter
903	SL	1996/97	17 December 1996	(Austria) Thomas Sykora	(Italy) Alberto Tomba	(France) Sébastien Amiez
1012	SL	1999/00	13 December 1999	(Norway) Finn Christian Jagge	(Austria) Benjamin Raich	(Austria) Thomas Stangassinger
1057	SL	2000/01	19 December 2000	(Austria) Mario Matt	(Austria) Heinz Schilchegger	(Austria) Rainer Schönfelder
1084	SL	2001/02	10 December 2001	(United States) Bode Miller	(Italy) Giorgio Rocca	(Norway) Tom Stiansen
1159	SL	2002/03	15 December 2003	(Croatia) Ivica Kostelić	(Italy) Giorgio Rocca	(Austria) Manfred Pranger
1234	SL	2005/06	12 December 2005	(Italy) Giorgio Rocca	(Austria) Benjamin Raich	(Finland) Kalle Palander
1500	SL	2012/13	18 December 2012	(Austria) Marcel Hirscher	(Germany) Felix Neureuther	(Japan) Naoki Yuasa
1568	SL	2014/15	22 December 2014	(Germany) Felix Neureuther	(Germany) Fritz Dopfer	(Sweden) Jens Byggmark
1605	SL	2015/16	22 December 2015	(Norway) Henrik Kristoffersen	(Austria) Marcel Hirscher	(Austria) Marco Schwarz
1648	SL	2016/17	22 December 2016	(Norway) Henrik Kristoffersen	(Austria) Marcel Hirscher	(Italy) Stefano Gross
1685	SL	2017/18	22 December 2017	(Austria) Marcel Hirscher	(Switzerland) Luca Aerni	(Norway) Henrik Kristoffersen
1722	SL	2018/19	22 December 2018	(Switzerland) Daniel Yule	(Austria) Marco Schwarz	(Austria) Michael Matt
1762	SL	2019/20	8 January 2020	(Switzerland) Daniel Yule	(Norway) Henrik Kristoffersen	(France) Clément Noël
1793	SL	2020/21	22 December 2020	(Norway) Henrik Kristoffersen	(Norway) Sebastian Foss Solevåg	(Italy) Alex Vinatzer
1831	SL	2021/22	22 December 2021	(Norway) Sebastian Foss Solevåg	(France) Alexis Pinturault	(Sweden) Kristoffer Jakobsen
1866	SL	2022/23	22 December 2022	(Switzerland) Daniel Yule	(Norway) Henrik Kristoffersen	(Germany) Linus Straßer
1900	SL	2023/24	22 December 2023	(Austria) Marco Schwarz	(France) Clément Noël	(United Kingdom) Dave Ryding
1942	SL	2024/25	8 January 2025	(Bulgaria) Albert Popov	(Switzerland) Loïc Meillard	(Croatia) Samuel Kolega
1981	SL	2025/26	7 January 2026	(France) Clément Noël	(Finland) Eduard Hallberg	(France) Paco Rassat

Not on the original World Cup calendar, just a replacement for Kranjska Gora (2000).
Combined events with DH or SG in Val Gardena (1979, 1980, 1981, 1982)
Parallel slalom counted for Nations Cup rankings only (1978).

== Women's World Cup ==
Those events didn't count for 3-Tre competition, replacing other venues only.

No.	Type	Season	Date	Winner	Second	Third
450	SL	1984/85	14 December 1984	(Poland) Dorota Tlałka	(Switzerland) Brigitte Gadient	(Switzerland) Christelle Guignard
1085	SL	2003/04	16 December 2003	(Sweden) Anja Pärson	(France) Laure Pequegnot	(Austria) Nicole Hosp
1086	SL	2003/04	17 December 2003	(Austria) Nicole Hosp	(Sweden) Anja Pärson	(Austria) Marlies Schild

Not on the original World Cup calendar; replacement for Piancavallo (1984), Špindlerův Mlýn (2003) in Vrátna dolina (2003).

== Course sections ==
- Minicentrale, Diagonale, Entrata Canalone, Ginocchio, Muro
