= 1992 Alpine Skiing World Cup – Men's downhill =

1992 Men's downhill World Cup
Previous: 1991	Next: 1993

Men's downhill World Cup 1991/1992

== Calendar ==
Round	Race No	Place	Country	Date	Winner	Second	Third
1	5	Val d'Isère	France	December 7, 1991	(United States) A. J. Kitt	(Austria) Leonhard Stock	(Switzerland) Franz Heinzer
2	8	Val Gardena	Italy	December 14, 1991	(Switzerland) Franz Heinzer	(Austria) Leonhard Stock	(Norway) Atle Skårdal
3	13	Garmisch-Partenkirchen	Germany	January 11, 1992	(Germany) Markus Wasmeier	(Austria) Patrick Ortlieb	(Germany) Hans-Jörg Tauscher
4	17	Kitzbühel	Austria	January 17, 1992	(Switzerland) Franz Heinzer	(Switzerland) Daniel Mahrer	(Switzerland) Xavier Gigandet
5	18	Kitzbühel	Austria	January 18, 1992	(Switzerland) Franz Heinzer	(United States) A. J. Kitt	(Austria) Patrick Ortlieb
6	22	Wengen	Switzerland	January 25, 1992	(Switzerland) Franz Heinzer	(Germany) Markus Wasmeier	(Austria) Helmut Höflehner
7	28	Panorama	Canada	March 6, 1992	(Switzerland) William Besse	(Switzerland) Daniel Mahrer (Austria) Günther Mader
8	29	Panorama	Canada	March 7, 1992	(Switzerland) Daniel Mahrer	(Norway) Jan Einar Thorsen	(United States) A. J. Kitt
9	31	Aspen	United States	March 14, 1992	(Switzerland) Daniel Mahrer	(Switzerland) William Besse	(Austria) Patrick Ortlieb

== Final point standings ==
In men's downhill World Cup 1991/92 all results count.

Place	Name	Country	Total points	5 (France)	8 (Italy)	13 (Germany)	17 (Austria)	18 (Austria)	22 (Switzerland)	28 (Canada)	29 (Canada)	31 (United States)
1	Franz Heinzer	Switzerland	649	60	100	51	100	100	100	40	51	47
2	Daniel Mahrer	Switzerland	537	55	-	47	80	47	28	80	100	100
3	A. J. Kitt	United States	461	100	55	40	22	80	9	55	60	40
4	Patrick Ortlieb	Austria	450	47	51	80	34	60	40	47	31	60
5	Leonhard Stock	Austria	403	80	80	-	31	20	51	43	43	55
6	William Besse	Switzerland	366	9	20	-	51	31	55	100	20	80
7	Markus Wasmeier	Germany	371	28	12	100	24	34	80	1	55	37
8	Xavier Gigandet	Switzerland	325	51	43	28	60	55	34	20	18	16
9	Jan Einar Thorsen	Norway	324	31	28	43	40	37	-	31	80	34
10	Günther Mader	Austria	286	-	-	2	43	43	47	80	47	24
11	Helmut Höflehner	Austria	249	24	7	22	47	55	60	-	12	22
12	Lasse Arnesen	Norway	242	-	9	16	55	28	43	37	26	28
13	Marc Girardelli	Luxembourg	182	22	26	34	1	2	37	14	3	43
14	Hans-Jörg Tauscher	Germany	150	2	34	60	18	-	24	5	6	1
15	Kristian Ghedina	Italy	147	14	47	20	10	14	-	7	9	26
16	Felix Belczyk	Canada	124	-	-	14	20	12	-	18	40	20
17	Atle Skårdal	Norway	103	43	60	-	-	-	-	-	-	-
18	Berni Huber	Germany	115	37	40	-	-	-	-	22	6	10
19	Brian Stemmle	Canada	104	20	16	55	-	-	8	-	-	5
20	Armin Assinger	Austria	111	40	37	-	-	-	-	10	24	-
21	Christophe Fivel	France	108	-	-	-	-	-	20	51	37	-
22	Niklas Henning	Sweden	104	18	10	-	-	-	16	26	34	-
23	Peter Rzehak	Austria	103	34	31	26	12	-	-	-	-	-
24	Adrien Duvillard	France	94	-	-	-	16	40	-	16	16	6
25	Luc Alphand	France	80	18	14	-	-	-	-	34	14	-
26	Peter Müller	Switzerland	70	12	6	9	7	4	18	-	-	14
27	Peter Wirnsberger	Austria	79	-	-	3	26	24	26	-	-	-
28	Urs Lehmann	Switzerland	68	3	26	6	-	9	24	-	-	-
29	Franck Piccard	France	65	-	-	-	-	-	-	6	28	31
30	Denis Rey	France	63	7	-	-	-	-	6	28	22	-
	Hannes Trinkl	Austria	57	6	-	-	-	-	-	-	-	51
32	Luigi Colturi	Italy	60	-	-	9	37	-	14	-	-	-
33	Hannes Zehentner	Germany	61	8	22	-	-	-	31	-	-	-
34	Paul Accola	Switzerland	52	-	-	37	6	1	-	8	-	-
35	Pietro Vitalini	Italy	45	5	8	-	-	8	-	24	-	-
36	Ed Podivinsky	Canada	46	-	1	31	14	-	-	-	-	-
37	Michael Mair	Italy	41	-	6	-	9	26	-	-	-	-
38	Bernd Simonlehner	Austria	42	-	-	24	-	18	-	-	-	-
	Christophe Plé	France	36	-	-	-	-	-	5	3	10	18
40	Tommy Moe	United States	34	26	4	4	-	-	-	-	-	-
41	Danilo Sbardellotto	Italy	31	-	-	-	28	3	-	-	-	-
42	Daniel Brunner	Switzerland	26	12	-	-	-	-	12	2	-	-
43	Peter Wirnsberger II	Austria	27	-	-	-	5	22	-	-	-	-
	Bernahrd Fahner	Switzerland	21	-	-	-	-	6	7	-	8	-
	Lionel Finance	France	25	-	2	18	2	-	-	-	3	-
46	Cary Mullen	Canada	23	-	-	7	-	16	-	-	-	-
47	Jeff Olson	United States	17	4	-	-	-	-	-	4	-	9
48	Gianfranco Martin	Italy	16	-	-	-	8	5	3	-	-	-
49	Roman Torn	Canada	16	-	-	-	-	-	4	12	-	-
	Ole Kristian Furuseth	Norway	15	-	-	-	-	-	-	9	6	-
51	Peter Runggaldier	Italy	18	-	18	-	-	-	-	-	-	-
52	Ronald Duncan	United Kingdom	13	-	-	10	3	-	-	-	-	-
53	Michael Haas	Austria	12	-	-	-	4	8	-	-	-	-
	Franco Cavegn	Switzerland	12	-	4	-	-	-	-	-	-	8
55	Josef Polig	Italy	12	-	-	12	-	-	-	-	-	-
	Werner Franz	Austria	12	-	-	-	-	-	-	-	-	12
57	Stephan Eberharter	Austria	10	-	-	-	-	10	-	-	-	-
	Peter Eigler	Germany	10	-	-	-	-	-	10	-	-	-
59	Asgeir Linberg	Norway	7	-	-	-	-	-	-	-	7	-
	Markus Foser	Liechtenstein	7	-	-	-	-	-	-	-	-	7
61	Rainer Salzgeber	Austria	5	-	-	5	-	-	-	-	-	-
62	Konstantin Chistyakov	Soviet Union	4	-	-	-	-	-	-	-	-	4
63	Patrik Järbyn	Sweden	3	-	-	-	-	-	-	-	-	3
	Kyle Rasmussen	United States	3	-	-	-	-	-	-	-	1	2
65	Paulo Oppliger	Chile	2	-	-	-	-	-	2	-	-	-
66	Vitali Andreev	Soviet Union	1	1	-	-	-	-	-	-	-	-
	Darren Thorburn	Canada	1	-	-	1	-	-	-	-	-	-
	Roman Rupp	Austria	1	-	-	-	-	-	1	-	-	-
	John Mealey	Canada	1	-	-	-	-	-	-	1	-	-

Alpine Skiing World Cup
Men

Overall | Downhill | Super G | Giant slalom | Slalom | Combined

1992
