= 1989–90 FIS Alpine Ski Europa Cup =

Alpine skiing competition

Discipline	Men	Women
Overall	(Italy) Christian Polig	(Sweden) Agneta Hjorth
Super-G	(Austria) Peter Wirnsberger II	(Austria) Karin Köllerer
Giant Slalom	(Sweden) Peter Olsson	(Norway) Merete Fjeldavlie
Slalom	(Italy) Christian Polig	(Austria) Elfi Eder

Competition

1989–90 FIS Alpine Ski Europa Cup was the 19th season of the FIS Alpine Ski Europa Cup.

In this season neither male nor female downhill was disputed, so the discipline Cup was not awarded.

== Standings ==
=== Overall ===
Men

Rank	Skier	Country	Points
1	Christian Polig	Italy	138
2	Fabio De Crignis	Italy	112
3	Dietmar Koehlbichler	Austria	109
4	Sergio Bergamelli	Italy	83
5	Peter Olsson	Sweden	81
5	Luca Pesando	Italy	81
7	Peter Namberger	West Germany	80
7	Christophe Berra	Switzerland	80
9	Giovanni Moro	Italy	76
10	Marco Hangl	Switzerland	69

Ladies

Rank	Skier	Country	Points
1	Agneta Hjorth	Sweden	135
2	Elfi Eder	Austria	125
3	Merete Fjeldavlie	Norway	107
4	Angelica Hurler	West Germany	104
5	Angela Drexl	West Germany	100
6	Manuela Umele	Austria	99
7	Florence Masnada	France	78
8	Gaby May	Switzerland	76
9	Kristina Andersson	Sweden	73
10	Krista Schmidinger	United States	71

=== Super G ===
Men

Rank	Skier	Country	Points
1	Peter Wirnsberger II	Austria	58
2	Marco Hangl	Switzerland	54
3	Dietmar Thöni	Austria	46
4	Patrick Holzer	Italy	39
5	Franz Retzer	West Germany	33

Ladies

Rank	Skier	Country	Points
1	Karin Koellerer	Austria	37
2	Angelica Hurler	West Germany	30
3	Gaby May	Switzerland	29
4	Sabine Ginther	Austria	25
5	Krista Schmidinger	United States	21

=== Giant Slalom ===
Men

Rank	Skier	Country	Points
1	Peter Olsson	Sweden	81
2	Stephane Cretin	France	61
2	Peter Namberger	West Germany	61
4	Sergio Bergamelli	Italy	52
5	Heinz Holzer	Italy	46

Ladies

Rank	Skier	Country	Points
1	Merete Fjeldavlie	Norway	74
2	Angelica Hurler	West Germany	72
3	Ylva Nowén	Sweden	68
4	Julie Lunde Hansen	Norway	65
5	Manuela Umele	Austria	53

=== Slalom ===
Men

Rank	Skier	Country	Points
1	Christian Polig	Italy	113
2	Fabio De Crignis	Italy	96
3	Dietmar Koehlbichler	Austria	88
4	Christophe Berra	Switzerland	80
5	Giovanni Moro	Italy	76

Ladies

Rank	Skier	Country	Points
1	Elfi Eder	Austria	125
2	Agneta Hjorth	Sweden	115
3	Angela Drexl	West Germany	100
4	Florence Masnada	France	63
5	Camilla Lundbäck	Sweden	62
