= Martina Accola =

Swiss alpine skier (born 1969)

Martina Accola (born 8 March 1969, Davos) is a Swiss former alpine skier who competed in the 1994 Winter Olympics and 1998 Winter Olympics. She is the sister of former alpine skiing World Cup overall champion Paul Accola.

Accola was born to Paul and Anna Accola as their only daughter and the third of four children. Her brothers are Andreas, Thomas, and Paul. After her athletics career, she worked as a business clerk.
