= Krista Schmidinger =

American alpine skier (born 1970)

Personal information
- Full name: Krista Maria Schmidinger
- Born: May 18, 1970 (age 56) Pittsfield, Massachusetts, U.S.
- Height: 5 ft 4 in (1.62 m)

Sport
- Sport: Skiing
Medal record
Women's alpine skiing
Representing the United States
Winter Pan American Games
Gold medal – first place	1990 Las Leñas	Super-G

Krista Maria Schmidinger (born May 18, 1970 in Pittsfield, Massachusetts) is an American former alpine skier who competed in the 1992 Winter Olympics and 1994 Winter Olympics.
