= Joe Levins =

American alpine skier (born 1968)

Frank Joseph "Joe" Levins (born November 12, 1968, in Minneapolis) is an American former alpine skier who competed in the men's slalom at the 1992 Winter Olympics.
