= Stéphane Exartier =

French/Polish alpine skier (born 1969)

Personal information
- Nationality: French
- Born: 12 March 1969; Chambéry, France

Sport
- Sport: alpine skiing

Stéphane Exartier (born 12 March 1969 in Chambéry) is a French former alpine skier who competed in the 1992 Winter Olympics.

He later competed for Poland.
