= Christian Polig =

Italian alpine skier

Personal information
- Born: 22 December 1966 (age 59) Sterzing, Italy

Skiing career
- Sport: Alpine skiing
- Club: C.S. Carabinieri (1987-1999)
- Retired: 1999
- Disciplines: Technical events
- World Cup debut: 1990

World Cup
- Seasons: 5

Christian Polig (born 22 December 1966) is an Italian former alpine skier who won the Europa Cup overall title in 1990.

Although he is also from Sterzing, he is not a relative of the other Italian skier Josef Polig.

== Career ==
His skiing career had its peak in the two-year period 1990-92 where in addition to the titles in the Europa Cup and a top ten result in the World Cup, in 1991 he also achieved a 2nd place in slalom at the Italian championships. Polig retired in 1999.

== World Cup results ==
Top 10

Date	Place	Discipline	Position
26-02-1991	(Norway) Oppdal	Giant Slalom	10

== Europa Cup results ==
Polig has won an overall Europa Cup and one discipline cup.

- FIS Alpine Ski Europa Cup
  - Overall: 1990
  - Slalom: 1990
