= Reggie Crist =

American alpine skier (born 1968)

Reggie Crist (born July 12, 1968) is an American former alpine skier who competed in the 1992 Winter Olympics. After 10 years as a member of the US Ski Team, Crist helped pioneer the sport of Ski Cross which is now an Olympic Sport. Crist became the first Ski Cross athlete to win X Games twice (2002 and 2005), marking his 5th consecutive podium finish. Crist has also been a regularly featured skier in Warren Miller ski films. Crist currently works as heli-ski guides in Haines, Alaska.
