= Matthew Grosjean =

American alpine skier (born 1970)

Matthew Reid "Matt" Grosjean (born September 21, 1970) is an American former alpine skier who competed in the 1992 Winter Olympics, 1994 Winter Olympics, and 1998 Winter Olympics. He was born in Chicago, Illinois.
