= Alberto Senigagliesi =

Italian alpine skier (born 1970)

Giulio Bosca
Personal information
- Born: 12 August 1970 (age 55) Turin, Italy
- Height: 1.75 m (5 ft 9 in)

Skiing career
- Sport: Alpine skiing
- Retired: 2003
- Disciplines: Polyvalent
- World Cup debut: 1988

Olympics
- Teams: 1
- Medals: 0

World Championships
- Teams: 1
- Medals: 0

World Cup
- Seasons: 11
- Podiums: 0
Medal record
World Junior Championships
| Bronze medal – third place | 1989 Aleyska | Slalom |

Alberto Senigagliesi (born 12 August 1970) is an Italian former alpine skier who competed in the 1992 Winter Olympics.

He was race setter for the controversial Cortina 2024 Downhill race which saw the crashes of the Mikeala Shiffrin, Frederica Breigione, Michelle Gissin and Priska Nufer.
