= Fabio De Crignis =

Italian alpine skier

Personal information
- Born: 7 April 1968 (age 58) Chiesa in Valmalenco, Italy

Skiing career
- Sport: Alpine skiing
- Club: Fiamme Gialle
- Retired: 1997
- Disciplines: Technical events
- World Cup debut: 1991

Olympics
- Teams: 1

World Championships
- Teams: 2

World Cup
- Seasons: 7
- Podiums: 2

Fabio De Crignis (born 7 April 1968) is an Italian former alpine skier who competed in the 1992 Winter Olympics.

== Career ==
In his career in the World Cup has achieved 20 top 10 results and two podiums, all these in slalom. He finished 2nd in the 1989–90 FIS Alpine Ski Europa Cup overall.

== World Cup results ==
Podiums

Date	Place	Discipline	Rank
26-11-1995	(United States) Park City	Slalom	3
10-03-1991	(United States) Aspen	Slalom	3
