= Marco Hangl =

Swiss alpine skier (born 1967)

Marco Hangl (born 20 April 1967 in Samnaun) is a Swiss former alpine skier who competed in the 1992 Winter Olympics and 1994 Winter Olympics.
