= Peter Roth (alpine skier) =

German alpine skier (born 1961)

Peter Roth (born January 30, 1961) is a German former alpine skier who competed for West Germany in the 1988 Winter Olympics and for Germany in the 1992 Winter Olympics and in the 1994 Winter Olympics.

He was born in Königsee.

In 1990 he won his only world cup slalom in New Zealand and finished twelfth in the 1991 slalom world cup.

His best Olympic performance was in 1992 when he finished 16th in the slalom event.
