= Xavier Gigandet =

Swiss alpine skier (born 1966)

Xavier Gigandet (born 15 August 1966) is a retired Swiss alpine skier who competed in the 1992 Winter Olympics.
