= Patrice Bianchi =

French alpine skier (born 1969)

Patrice Bianchi (born 10 April 1969 in Bourg-Saint-Maurice) is a French former alpine skier who competed in the men's slalom at the 1992 Winter Olympics.
