= Didrik Marksten =

Norwegian alpine skier (born 1971)

Personal information
- Born: 1 March 1971 (age 55) Oslo, Norway

Sport
- Sport: Alpine skiing

Didrik Marksten (born 1 March 1971) is a Norwegian alpine skier. He was born in Oslo, and represented the club IF Ready. He competed at the 1992 Winter Olympics in Albertville.
