= Hansjörg Tauscher =

German alpine skier (born 1967)

Medal record

Men's alpine skiing

Representing West Germany

World Championships
| Gold medal – first place | 1989 Vail | Downhill |

Hansjörg Tauscher (born 15 September 1967 in Oberstdorf) is a retired German alpine skier. His best career achievement in the World Cup was third place in a downhill race in Garmisch in January 1992, but he surprisingly won the downhill race at the WC 1989 in Vail.
