= Jan Einar Thorsen =

Norwegian alpine skier (born 1966)

Olympic medal record

Men's Alpine skiing
| Bronze medal – third place | 1992 Albertville | Super-G |

Jan Einar Thorsen (born 31 August 1966) is a Norwegian former Alpine skier, active between 1987 and 1994. He won three World Cup victories, two in Super-G and one in Giant slalom. In addition he won the World Cup title for Super G in 1994. At the 1992 Olympics in Albertville, Thorsen won a bronze medal in the Super-G, and in addition came fifth in the Downhill. At the 1994 Olympics in Lillehammer, Thorsen just missed out on another Olympic medal - he came fourth in the giant slalom.

== World Cup victories ==
| Date | Location | Race |
|---|---|---|
| 5 December 1992 | (France) Val-d'Isère | Super G |
| 18 January 1994 | (Switzerland) Crans-Montana | Giant slalom |
| 17 March 1994 | (United States) Vail | Super G |
