= Alberto Tomba =

Italian alpine skier (born 1966)

Alberto Tomba Golden Collar of Sports Merit - Army Gold Cross of Merit
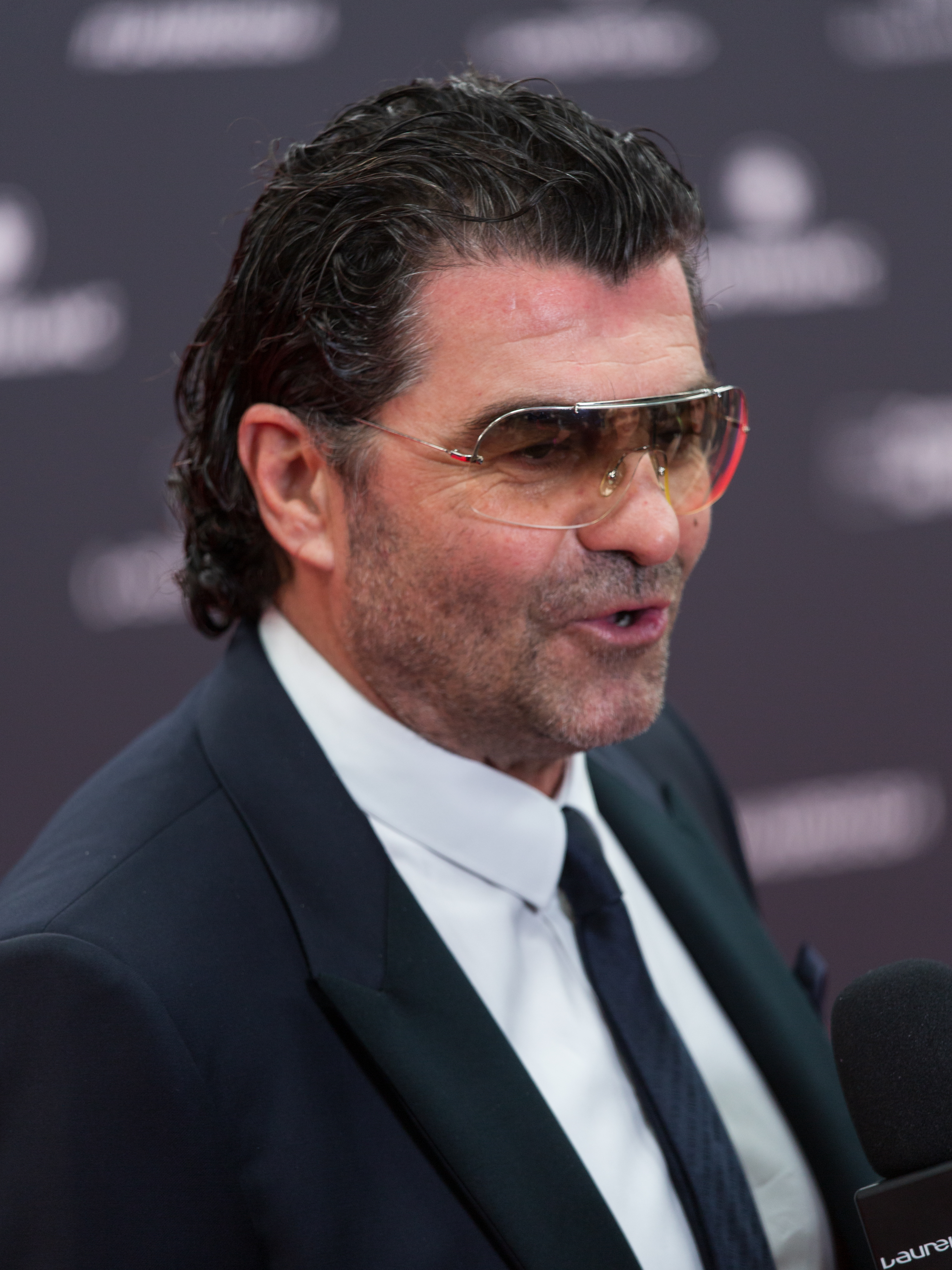
- Tomba in 2022 (age 56)

Personal information
- Born: 19 December 1966 (age 59) San Lazzaro di Savena, Emilia-Romagna, Italy
- Height: 1.82 m (6 ft 0 in)
- Website: albertotomba.it

Skiing career
- Sport: Alpine skiing
- Club: C.S. Carabinieri
- Retired: March 1998 (age 31)
- Disciplines: Slalom, giant slalom, super-G
- World Cup debut: 16 December 1985 (age 18)

Olympics
- Teams: 4 (1988–98)
- Medals: 5 (3 gold)

World Championships
- Teams: 6 (1987–97)
- Medals: 4 (2 gold)

World Cup
- Seasons: 13 (1985–98)
- Wins: 50 (15 GS, 35 SL)
- Podiums: 88 (31 GS, 57 SL)
- Overall titles: 1 (1995)
- Discipline titles: 8 (4 GS, 4 SL)
Medal record
Men's alpine skiing
Representing Italy
World Cup race podiums
Event	1st	2nd	3rd
Slalom	35	15	7
Giant	15	11	5
Total	50	26	12
International alpine ski competitions
Event	1st	2nd	3rd
Olympic Games	3	2	0
World Championships	2	0	2
Total	5	2	2
Olympic Games
Gold medal – first place	1988 Calgary	Slalom
Gold medal – first place	1988 Calgary	Giant slalom
Gold medal – first place	1992 Albertville	Giant slalom
Silver medal – second place	1992 Albertville	Slalom
Silver medal – second place	1994 Lillehammer	Slalom
World Championships
Gold medal – first place	1996 Sierra Nevada	Slalom
Gold medal – first place	1996 Sierra Nevada	Giant slalom
Bronze medal – third place	1987 Crans-Montana	Giant slalom
Bronze medal – third place	1997 Sestriere	Slalom

Alberto Tomba Golden Collar of Sports Merit - Army Gold Cross of Merit (born 19 December 1966) is a former World Cup alpine ski racer from Italy. He was the dominant technical skier (slalom and giant slalom) in the late 1980s and 1990s. At 182 cm and 90 kg, his powerful build was a contrast to the lighter, more traditional technical skiers who prioritised agility over muscle. Tomba was able to take advantage of the introduction of spring-loaded ski gates which replaced the older, solid gates in the early 1980s by using his power to maintain a faster, more direct line through courses. Tomba won three Olympic gold medals, two World Championships, and nine World Cup season titles: four in slalom, four in giant slalom, and one overall title. He was popularly called Tomba la Bomba ("Tomba the Bomb").

== Early years ==
Alberto Tomba was born in Bologna and raised in Castel de Britti, a village in the municipality of San Lazzaro di Savena – an area without strong alpine traditions, but not far from the appenninic piste of Monte Cimone and Corno alle Scale. His father Franco, a businessman in the textile industry, had been a keen skier since attending college in Switzerland and passed his love of the sport to his sons, driving Alberto and his older brother Marco from their home to Sestola so they could ski. Alberto learned to ski at the age of three and started racing at the age of seven. As a child, he participated in sports like tennis, football, and dirt biking, but preferred skiing. Later in life, in 1988, his father Franco promised him a Ferrari if he won a gold medal that year and, as he celebrated his first gold at the bottom of the slope, Alberto told his father and the television viewers that he wanted the car to be red.

In 1984 he took part in the Junior World Championships, where a fourth-place finish won him a position on the national B team. That year, in an exhibition parallel slalom competition in San Siro, Milan, he surprised everyone by beating every member of the A team. After three wins on the Europa Cup circuit, Tomba made his World Cup debut in December 1985 at Madonna di Campiglio, Italy, three days before his nineteenth birthday. Two months later, in Åre, Sweden, he surprised the skiing world by finishing sixth from a bib number of 62. His first podium came the following season in Alta Badia, Italy in December 1986, and later that winter he won bronze in the giant slalom at the 1987 World Championships in Crans-Montana, Switzerland - the only medal won by the Italian team at that World Championships.

== Rise to fame ==
On 27 November 1987, Tomba scored his first World Cup victory, in a slalom at Sestriere, Italy (with starting bib number 25). Two days later he won the giant slalom, beating Ingemar Stenmark.

He went on to win nine races that 1988 season, including a slalom win at Madonna di Campiglio where he beat the second-placed finisher by 1.34 seconds, shouting "I am the new messiah of skiing!" as he crossed the finish line. He won that year's World Cup titles in both slalom and giant slalom, but was runner-up in the overall standings to Pirmin Zurbriggen of Switzerland. During this early part of his career, Tomba also competed in super-G, an event he would continue to contest until 1989, despite never finishing better than fourth.

At the 1988 Winter Olympics in Calgary, Tomba won gold medals in slalom and giant slalom. In the first run of the GS, he finished 1.14 seconds ahead of his nearest competitor.

Tomba was not as successful in the following two seasons, winning a total of four World Cup races. At the 1989 World Championships in Vail, Colorado, he could do no better than sixth place in the super G and seventh in the giant slalom. From 1989 to the end of his career, Tomba was surrounded by his own technical staff managed by former Olympic champion Gustav Thöni and strength and conditioning coach Giorgio d'Urbano, who worked with him for ten seasons.

Tomba was temporarily put out of action in 1990 when he crashed in a World Cup race in Val-d'Isère, breaking his collarbone. However, in the 1991 season, Tomba returned to his winning ways, winning the giant slalom World Cup title for a second time while finishing fourth in the slalom standings. He ended 4th in slalom at the 1991 World Championships at Saalbach-Hinterglemm (Austria) and crashed in the second giant slalom run after having clocked the fastest time in the first leg, handing the victory to Austria's Rudolf Nierlich, the two-time winner at Vail, Colorado, two years earlier. In September 1991, he also met former Miss Italy, Martina Colombari, whom he dated for several years.

Tomba's career reached its second peak during the 1992 season with nine victories and fifteen podiums, and he once again captured the season-long discipline titles in both his technical specialties. His duel with Paul Accola for the overall World Cup crown extended until the very end of the season and the Finals at Crans-Montana, but the Swiss skier scoring points in all disciplines including downhill and combined ultimately prevailed. At the 1992 Winter Olympics in Albertville, France, Tomba won what was to be his last gold medal at Val d'Isère, in the giant slalom, and picked up a silver in the slalom. In Val d'Isère, he became the first alpine champion to successfully defend an Olympic title when he won the giant slalom ahead of Marc Girardelli.

The 1993 World Championships, held in Morioka, Japan, again proved to be his nemesis. Tomba was suffering from a fever during the giant slalom and made a critical mistake in the slalom, failing to reach the podium in either race. To make matters worse, he only managed to win a single World Cup race in the entire 1993 season.

== Overall World Cup champion ==
Tomba competed in the 1994 Winter Olympics in Lillehammer, Norway. After his slalom run, he was seemingly out of medal contention, (placed 12th) 1.84 seconds behind leader Thomas Stangassinger (and 1.00 behind place 3, Peter Roth), but in the second run he recovered to second place and won the silver medal.

In the 1995 Alpine Skiing World Cup he amassed 11 victories in the technical events including seven in a row in slalom to capture the overall World Cup title.

At the 1996 World Championships, Tomba finally added the final missing pieces to his trophy case, winning two gold medals at Sierra Nevada, Spain. His GS victory came thanks to a second-run rally from 0.81 seconds behind.

Tomba competed in the FIS Alpine World Ski Championships 1997 on his home snow in Sestriere. He was disqualified in the giant slalom and had a disappointing first run in the slalom, but a second run was good enough for his last major medal, a bronze. He decided to continue competing for one more year.

Tomba's performance at the 1998 Winter Olympics in Nagano was a sign that his career was winding to a close: for the first time in his Olympic career, he failed to medal after crashing in giant slalom. He suffered a painful injury and was not able to start in the second slalom run after losing much time in the first leg.

Alberto Tomba retired at the end of the 1998 season, but not before winning a last World Cup race at the Finals at Crans-Montana where he grabbed the slalom, becoming the only alpine male skier to have won at least one World Cup race per year for 11 consecutive seasons.

== Post-racing life ==
After retiring from competitions, Tomba made numerous appearances on Italian television broadcasts, and in 2000 he made his acting debut in the crime film Alex l'ariete, directed by Damiano Damiani; the movie, however, was met with little success and was unanimously panned by movie critics.

At the 2006 Winter Olympics Opening Ceremony in Turin, Tomba brought the Olympic Flame into the stadium where he handed it off to the men's 4 × 10 km gold medalists from the 1994 Winter Olympics in Lillehammer (De Zolt, Albarello, Vanzetta, Fauner). During the 2010 edition of "Sport Movies & TV - Milano International FICTS Fest" he was awarded with "Excellence Guirlande D'Honneur" and entered in the FICTS "Hall of Fame". At the 2026 Milano Cortina Winter Olympics opening ceremony, he was one of the three last torch bearers, lighting the Milan Olympic cauldron alongside Deborah Compagnoni.

== Medals ==
=== Winter Olympic Games ===
- 1988: gold in giant slalom, gold in slalom at Calgary, Alberta, Canada (Nakiska).
- 1992: gold in giant slalom, silver in slalom at Albertville, France (Val d'Isère).
- 1994: silver in slalom at Lillehammer, Norway (Hafjell).

=== Alpine World Ski championships ===
- 1987: bronze in giant slalom at Crans Montana, Switzerland.
- 1996: gold in giant slalom, gold in slalom at Sierra Nevada, Spain.
- 1997: bronze in slalom at Sestriere, Italy

=== Alpine skiing World Cup ===
- 50 victories (35 in slalom, 15 in giant slalom), including seven consecutive slalom wins in the 1995 season.
- 28-second-place finishes
- 11 third-place finishes

== World Cup results ==
=== Season standings ===
Season	Age	Overall	Slalom	Giant slalom	Super G	Downhill	Combined
1986	19	51	39	23	19	—	—
1987	20	15	24	9	18	—	—
1988	21	2	1	1	8	—	—
1989	22	3	2	7	7	—	—
1990	23	9	2	14	—	—	—
1991	24	2	6	1	—	—	—
1992	25	2	1	1	43	—	—
1993	26	5	2	2	—	—	—
1994	27	3	1	11	—	—	—
1995	28	1	1	1	—	—	—
1996	29	5	2	8	—	—	—
1997	30	25	5	—	—	—	—
1998	31	14	7	13	—	—	—

=== Season titles ===
- 9 titles (1 overall, 4 giant slalom, 4 slalom)

Season	Discipline
1988	Giant slalom
1988	Slalom
1991	Giant slalom
1992	Giant slalom
1992	Slalom
1994	Slalom
1995	Overall
1995	Giant slalom
1995	Slalom

=== Race victories ===
- 50 wins (15 GS, 35 SL)
- 88 podiums (31 GS, 57 SL)

Season	Date	Location	Race
1988	27 November 1987	Sestriere, Italy	Slalom
1988	29 November 1987	Sestriere, Italy	Giant slalom
1988	13 December 1987	Alta Badia, Italy	Giant slalom
1988	16 December 1987	Madonna di Campiglio, Italy	Slalom
1988	20 December 1987	Kranjska Gora, Slovenia	Slalom
1988	17 January 1988	Bad Kleinkirchheim, Austria	Slalom
1988	19 January 1988	Saas Fee, Switzerland	Giant slalom
1988	19 March 1988	Åre, Sweden	Slalom
1988	22 March 1988	Oppdal, Norway	Slalom
1989	11 December 1988	Madonna di Campiglio, Italy	Slalom
1990	29 November 1989	Waterville Valley, US	Slalom
1990	8 March 1990	Geilo, Norway	Slalom
1990	12 March 1990	Sälen, Sweden	Slalom
1991	11 December 1990	Sestriere, Italy	Slalom
1991	16 December 1990	Alta Badia, Italy	Giant slalom
1991	21 December 1990	Kranjska Gora, Slovenia	Giant slalom
1991	1 March 1991	Lillehammer, Norway	Giant slalom
1991	9 March 1991	Aspen, US	Giant slalom
1991	21 March 1991	Waterville Valley, US	Giant slalom
1992	23 November 1991	Park City, US	Giant slalom
1992	24 November 1991	Park City, US	Slalom
1992	10 December 1991	Sestriere, Italy	Slalom
1992	15 December 1991	Alta Badia, Italy	Giant slalom
1992	5 January 1992	Kranjska Gora, Slovenia	Slalom
1992	19 January 1992	Kitzbühel, Austria	Slalom
1992	26 January 1992	Wengen, Switzerland	Slalom
1992	20 March 1992	Crans-Montana, Switzerland	Giant slalom
1992	22 March 1992	Crans-Montana, Switzerland	Slalom
1993	9 January 1993	Garmisch, Germany	Slalom
1994	5 December 1993	Stoneham, Canada	Slalom
1994	14 December 1993	Sestriere, Italy	Slalom
1994	30 January 1994	Chamonix, France	Slalom
1994	6 February 1994	Garmisch, Germany	Slalom
1995	4 December 1994	Tignes, France	Slalom
1995	12 December 1994	Sestriere, Italy	Slalom
1995	20 December 1994	Lech am Arlberg, Austria	Slalom
1995	21 December 1994	Lech am Arlberg, Austria	Slalom
1995	22 December 1994	Alta Badia, Italy	Giant slalom
1995	6 January 1995	Kranjska Gora, Slovenia	Giant slalom
1995	8 January 1995	Garmisch, Germany	Slalom
1995	15 January 1995	Kitzbühel, Austria	Slalom
1995	22 January 1995	Wengen, Switzerland	Slalom
1995	4 February 1995	Adelboden, Switzerland	Giant slalom
1995	18 March 1995	Bormio, Italy	Giant slalom
1996	19 December 1995	Madonna di Campiglio, Italy	Slalom
1996	22 December 1995	Kranjska Gora, Slovenia	Slalom
1996	7 January 1996	Flachau, Austria	Slalom
1997	30 January 1997	Schladming, Austria	Slalom
1998	8 January 1998	Schladming, Austria	Slalom
1998	15 March 1998	Crans-Montana, Switzerland	Slalom

== Olympics results ==
Edition	Giant slalom	Slalom	Super-G
(Canada) Calgary 1988	1	1	DNF
(France) Albertville 1992	1	2	-
(Norway) Lillehammer 1994	DQ	2	-
(Japan) Nagano 1998	DNF	DNF	-

== World Championships results ==
Edition	Giant slalom	Slalom	Super-G
(Switzerland) Crans Montana 1987	3	-	14
(United States) Vail 1989	7	DNF	6
(Austria) Saalbach 1991	DNF	4	-
(Japan) Morioka 1993		DNF	-
(Spain) Sierra Nevada 1996	1	1	-
(Italy) Sestriere 1997	DNF	3	-

== See also ==
- Ski World Cup Most podiums & Top 10 results
- Italy at the Olympics – Men gold medalist
- Italian skiers most successful race winner

== Honours ==
=== Orders ===
- CONI: Golden Collar of Sports Merit Collare d'Oro al Merito Sportivo - 1995
- ARMY: Army Gold Cross of Merit: Croce d'Oro al Merito dell'Esercito - 1991

Olympic Games
Preceded by Teddy Riner and Marie-José Pérec	Final Olympic torchbearer Milano Cortina 2026 alongside Deborah Compagnoni and Sofia Goggia	Succeeded by TBD 2028
Preceded by Dinigeer Yilamujiang and Zhao Jiawen	Final Winter Olympic torchbearer Milano Cortina 2026 alongside Deborah Compagnoni and Sofia Goggia	Succeeded by TBD 2030
Winter Olympics
Preceded by Maurilio De Zolt	Flag bearer for Italy; 1992 Albertville	Succeeded by Deborah Compagnoni
