= Finn Christian Jagge =

Norwegian alpine skier (1966–2020)

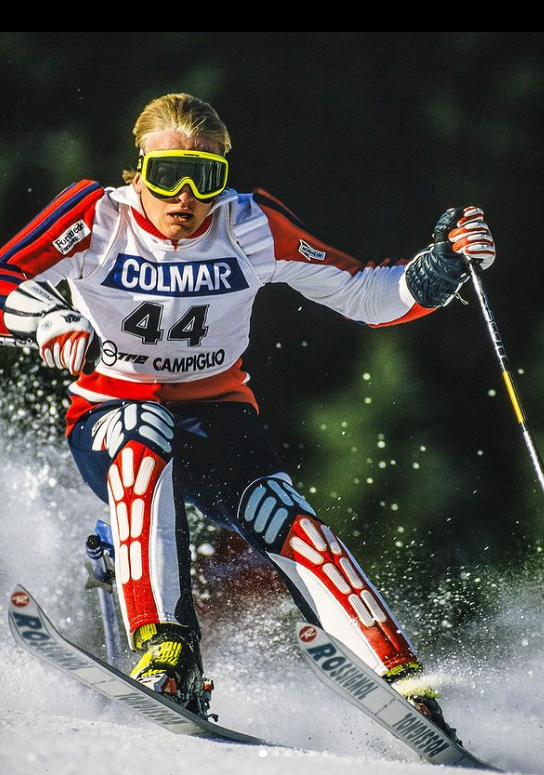

Personal information
- Born: 4 April 1966 Stabekk, Norway
- Died: 8 July 2020 (aged 54) Oslo, Norway

Skiing career
- Sport: Alpine skiing
- Retired: 2000
- Disciplines: Technical events
- World Cup debut: 1985

Olympics
- Teams: 4
- Medals: 1 (1 gold)

World Championships
- Teams: 8

World Cup
- Seasons: 16
- Wins: 7
- Podiums: 17
Medal record
Men's alpine skiing
Representing Norway
World Cup race podiums
Event	1st	2nd	3rd
Slalom	7	3	7
International competitions
Event	1st	2nd	3rd
Olympic Games	1	0	0
World Championships	0	0	0
Junior World Championships	0	0	2
Total	1	0	2
Men's Alpine skiing
Gold medal – first place	1992 Albertville	Slalom

Finn Christian "Finken" Jagge (4 April 1966 – 8 July 2020) was a Norwegian alpine skier.

== Biography ==
He was the son of alpine skier Liv Jagge-Christiansen and tennis player Finn Dag Jagge. In the World Cup he won seven slalom victories. He also won the Norwegian Championship eight times. His career highlight came with the gold medal in the slalom competition at the 1992 Olympics in Albertville. He retired in 2000. He trained the Norwegian women ski team from 2005 to 2007. He worked for the Norwegian telecom company Ludo and later as a Partner Headhunter for Dynamic People Headhunting in Oslo. Jagge won the Norwegian reality TV show Mesternes Mester in 2011. He was 54 years old, when he died after a short illness in July 2020. He was married to Trine-Lise Jagge and had two children.

== World Cup victories ==
Date	Location	Race
17 December 1991	(Italy) Madonna di Campiglio	Slalom
9 January 1994	(Slovenia) Kranjska Gora	Slalom
15 March 1997	(United States) Vail	Slalom
15 December 1997	(Italy) Sestriere	Slalom
14 December 1998	(Italy) Sestriere	Slalom
28 February 1999	(Germany) Ofterschwang	Slalom
13 December 1999	(Italy) Madonna di Campiglio	Slalom
