= Konrad Kurt Ladstätter =

Italian alpine skier (born 1968)

Personal information
- Born: 3 May 1968 (age 58) Olang, Italy

Skiing career
- Sport: Alpine skiing
- Club: G.S. Forestale
- Retired: 2000
- World Cup debut: 1985

Olympics
- Teams: 1
- Medals: 0

World Championships
- Teams: 2
- Medals: 0

World Cup
- Seasons: 16
- Wins: 0
- Podiums: 3
Medal record
World Junior Championships
Gold medal – first place	1986 Bad Kleinkirchheim	Slalom

Konrad Kurt Ladstätter (born 2 May 1968) is an Italian former alpine skier who competed in the 1992 Winter Olympics.

== Career ==
Two of the most important victories in Konrad Kurt Ladstätter's career, the junior world title won in Bad Kleinkirchheim in 1986 and the Italian title won ten years later, in 1996. Both successes in slalom.
