= Alain Feutrier =

French alpine skier (born 1968)

Alain Feutrier (born 16 February 1968) is a French former alpine skier who competed in the 1988 Winter Olympics and 1992 Winter Olympics.

He was born in Saint-Jean-de-Maurienne and did not succeed in winning any podium medals at the Winter Olympics that he competed in.
