= Thomas Stangassinger =

Austrian alpine skier

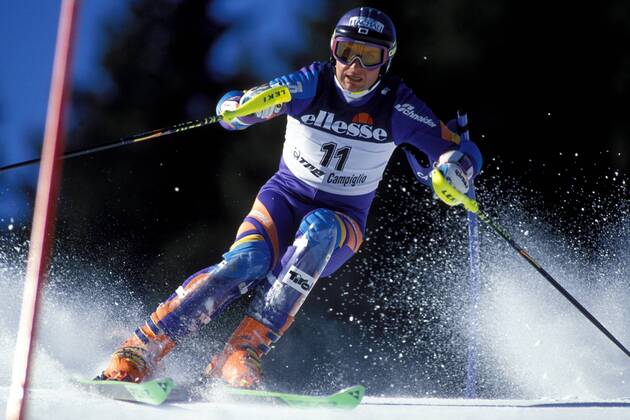
- Stangassinger in 1992 in Madonna di Campiglio.

Personal information
- Born: 15 September 1965 (age 60) Hallein, Austria

Skiing career
- Sport: Alpine skiing
- Retired: 2000
- Disciplines: Technical events
- World Cup debut: 1984

Olympics
- Teams: 1
- Medals: 1 (1 gold)

World Championships
- Teams: 2
- Medals: 2

World Cup
- Seasons: 16
- Wins: 10
- Podiums: 37
Medal record
Men's alpine skiing
Representing Austria
World Cup race podiums
Event	1st	2nd	3rd
Slalom	10	15	11
Combined	0	1	0
Total	10	16	11
Olympic Games
Gold medal – first place	1994 Lillehammer	Slalom
World Championships
Silver medal – second place	1991 Saalbach	Slalom
Bronze medal – third place	1993 Morioka	Slalom

Thomas Stangassinger (born 15 September 1965) is an Austrian former alpine skier.

== Career ==
Throughout the 1990s, he belonged to the international slalom elite. He won a silver medal in the World Ski Championships in Saalbach-Hinterglemm and a bronze medal in the World Ski Championships in Morioka. His career highlight came when he won the slalom competition at the 1994 Olympics in Lillehammer.

== World Cup victories ==
Date	Location	Race
3 December 1989	(Canada) Mont Sainte-Anne	Slalom
24 January 1993	(Switzerland) Veysonnaz	Slalom
28 November 1993	(United States) Park City	Slalom
16 January 1994	(Austria) Kitzbühel	Slalom
9 March 1997	(Japan) Shigakogen	Slalom
22 November 1997	(United States) Park City	Slalom
18 January 1998	(Switzerland) Veysonnaz	Slalom
25 January 1998	(Austria) Kitzbühel	Slalom
28 November 1998	(United States) Aspen	Slalom
13 March 1999	(Spain) Sierra Nevada	Slalom
