= Hans Pieren =

Swiss alpine skier (born 1962)

Hans Pieren (born 23 January 1962) is a Swiss former alpine skier who competed in the 1988 Winter Olympics and 1992 Winter Olympics.
