= Roberto Spampatti =

Italian alpine skier (born 1965)

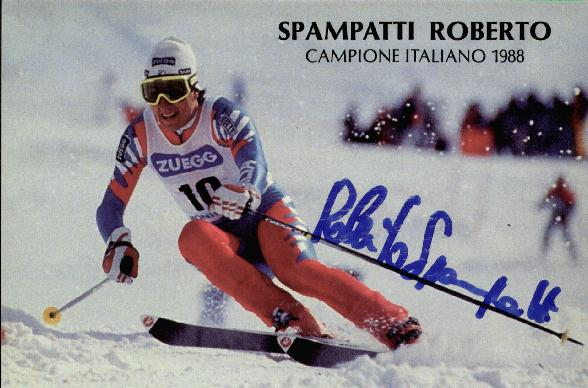
Roberto Spampatti

Roberto Spampatti (born 28 December 1965 in Clusone) is an Italian retired alpine skier.
