= Urs Kälin =

Swiss alpine skier (born 1966)

Personal information
- Born: 26 February 1966 (age 60)

Sport
- Sport: Skiing
Medal record
Men's alpine skiing
Representing Switzerland
Olympic Games
Silver medal – second place	1994 Lillehammer	Giant slalom
World Championships
Silver medal – second place	1991 Saalbach	Giant slalom
Silver medal – second place	1996 Sierra Nevada	Giant slalom

Urs Kälin (born 26 February 1966) is a Swiss former alpine skier. He competed at three Winter Olympics.

Kälin won three silver medals in Giant slalom: at the 1991 World Championships in Saalbach, at the 1994 Winter Olympics in Lillehammer, and at 1996 World Championships in Sierra Nevada.

== World Cup victories ==
Date	Location	Race
30 November 1989	(United States) Waterville Valley	Giant slalom
6 January 1996	(Austria) Flachau	Giant slalom
9 March 1996	(Norway) Kvitfjell	Giant slalom
