= Johan Wallner =

Swedish alpine skier

Medal record

Men's alpine skiing

Representing Sweden

World Championships
Bronze medal – third place	1991 Saalbach-Hinterglemm	Giant slalom
Bronze medal – third place	1993 Morioka-Shizukuishi	Giant slalom

Per Johan Daniel Wallner (born 8 February 1965 in Filipstad, Sweden) is a Swedish former alpine skier.

He won the slalom World Cup competition in Berchtesgaden on 14 January 1986.

== World Cup victories ==
Date	Location	Race
14 January 1986	(West Germany) Berchtesgaden	Slalom
