= Patrick Holzer =

Italian alpine skier (born 1970)

Personal information
- Born: 23 March 1970 (age 56) Sexten, Italy

Skiing career
- Sport: Alpine skiing
- Disciplines: Polyvalent

Patrick Holzer (born 23 March 1970) is an Italian former alpine skier.

Born at Sexten, he won a total of two World Cup races, one in Super-G and one in Giant Slalom.

== World Cup results ==
Wins

Date	Location	Race
January 12, 1992	(Germany) Garmisch-Partenkirchen	Super-G
January 5, 1999	(Slovenia) Kranjska Gora	Giant Slalom
