= Steve Locher =

Swiss alpine skier (born 1967)

Medal record

Men's alpine skiing

Representing Switzerland

Olympic Games
Bronze medal – third place	1992 Albertville	Combined

World Championships
Bronze medal – third place	1999 Vail / Beaver Creek	Giant Slalom

Steve Locher (born 19 September 1967 in Salins) is a former Swiss alpine skier, who won the bronze medal in the combined event at the 1992 Winter Olympics in Albertville.

== World Cup victories ==
Date	Location	Race
29 January 1990	(France) Val d'Isère	Super-G
19 December 1993	(Italy) Alta Badia	Giant Slalom
27 October 1996	(Austria) Sölden	Giant Slalom
