= Rainer Salzgeber =

Austrian alpine skier (born 1967)

Medal record

Men's alpine skiing

Representing Austria

World Championships
Silver medal – second place	1993 Morioka	Giant Slalom

Rainer Salzgeber (born 26 April 1967 in Schruns) is a retired Austrian alpine skier. He has served as Race Department Director for Head since 2002. He is married to fellow former alpine skier Anita Wachter.
