= Josef Polig =

Italian alpine skier (born 1968)

Personal information
- Born: 9 November 1968 (age 57) Sterzing, Italy

Skiing career
- Sport: Alpine skiing
- Club: Fiamme Gialle

Olympics
- Medals: 1 (1 gold)
Medal record
Olympic Games
Gold medal – first place	1992 Albertville	Alpine Combined

Josef Polig (born 9 November 1968, in Sterzing/Vipiteno, Italy) is an Italian former Alpine skier.

== Biography ==
He participated in the World Cup from 1988 to 1995 without getting a podium place, but he is among the few skiers who achieved top 10 positions in all five disciplines. He won gold medal in combined at the 1992 Olympics in Albertville.

== See also ==
- Italy national alpine ski team at the Olympics
