= Paul Accola =

Swiss alpine skier (born 1967)

Personal information
- Born: 20 February 1967 (age 59) Davos, Switzerland
Medal record
Men's alpine skiing
Representing Switzerland
Olympic Games
Bronze medal – third place	1988 Calgary	Alpine Combined
World Championships
Silver medal – second place	1989 Vail	Combined
Bronze medal – third place	1999 Vail / Beaver Creek	Combined
Bronze medal – third place	2001 St. Anton	Combined

Paul Accola (born 20 February 1967) is a Swiss former Alpine skier. He came in first in the overall World Cup in 1992, and won a total of four medals at the Winter Olympics and World Championships in the combined event.

By the end of his career, he won seven world cup victories and was on the podium 26 times, the last time being in 2000. In 2002 Accola suffered a serious ankle injury, breaking both of his talus bones. In February 2005, on his 38th birthday, Accola announced that he would retire as alpine skier after nearly two decades in the sport.

He is the sixth Swiss athlete to compete at five Olympics, after middle-distance runner Paul Martin, equestrians Henri Chammartin and Gustav Fischer, javelin thrower Urs von Wartburg and equestrian Christine Stückelberger.

In 2012, Accola was found not liable by Swiss courts of accidentally running over and killing a child with a riding mower, as he was found to have told the nearby children not to play in the area where he was mowing multiple times.

He is the brother of fellow former alpine skier Martina Accola.

== World Cup victories ==
Date	Location	Race
29 November 1991	(United States) Breckenridge	Giant Slalom
30 November 1991	(United States) Breckenridge	Slalom
13 January 1992	(Germany) Garmisch-Partenkirchen	Combined
19 January 1992	(Austria) Kitzbühel	Combined
26 January 1992	(Switzerland) Wengen	Combined
1 February 1992	(France) Megève	Super-G
1 March 1992	(Japan) Morioka	Super-G

== See also ==
- List of athletes with the most appearances at Olympic Games
