= 1985 Alpine Skiing World Cup – Men's giant slalom and super-G =

1985 Men's giant slalom and Super G World Cup
Previous: 1984	Next:	Super G 1986; Giant 1986

Men's giant slalom and Super G World Cup 1984/1985

This was the third and last year, when Giant slalom and Super G were counted together in one World Cup.

== Calendar ==
Round	Race No	Discipline	Place	Country	Date	Winner	Second	Third
1	2	Super G	Puy-Saint-Vincent	France	December 7, 1984	(Switzerland) Pirmin Zurbriggen	(Luxembourg) Marc Girardelli	(Switzerland) Thomas Bürgler
2	3	Giant	Puy-Saint-Vincent	France	December 8, 1984	(Italy) Robert Erlacher	(Switzerland) Martin Hangl	(Italy) Richard Pramotton
3	5	Giant	Sestriere	Italy	December 11, 1984	(Luxembourg) Marc Girardelli	(West Germany) Markus Wasmeier	(Switzerland) Max Julen
4	8	Super G	Madonna di Campiglio	Italy	December 17, 1984	(Luxembourg) Marc Girardelli	(Switzerland) Pirmin Zurbriggen	(Switzerland) Martin Hangl
5	12	Giant	Schladming	Austria	January 8, 1985	(Switzerland) Thomas Bürgler	(Luxembourg) Marc Girardelli	(Switzerland) Martin Hangl
6	18	Giant	Adelboden	Switzerland	January 15, 1985	(Austria) Hans Enn	(Austria) Hubert Strolz	(Italy) Richard Pramotton
7	24	Super G	Garmisch-Partenkirchen	West Germany	January 27, 1985	(Luxembourg) Marc Girardelli	(Liechtenstein) Andreas Wenzel	(West Germany) Hans Stuffer
8	27	Giant	Kranjska Gora	Yugoslavia	February 15, 1985	(Switzerland) Thomas Bürgler	(Switzerland) Pirmin Zurbriggen	(Luxembourg) Marc Girardelli
9	30	Super G	Furano	Japan	March 3, 1985	(Australia) Steven Lee (Switzerland) Daniel Mahrer		(Canada) Brian Stemmle
10	32	Giant	Aspen	United States	March 10, 1985	(Luxembourg) Marc Girardelli	(Sweden) Ingemar Stenmark	(Switzerland) Max Julen
11	34	Super G	Panorama	Canada	March 17, 1985	(Switzerland) Pirmin Zurbriggen	(Italy) Robert Erlacher	(Switzerland) Thomas Bürgler

== Final point standings ==
In men's giant slalom and Super G World Cup 1984/85 the best 5 results count. Deductions are given in brackets.

Place	Name	Country	Total points	Deduction	2 (France) SG	3 (France)	5 (Italy)	8 (Italy) SG	12 (Austria)	18 (Switzerland)	24 (Germany) SG	27 (Socialist Federal Republic of Yugoslavia)	30 (Japan) SG	32 (United States)	34 (Canada) SG
1	Marc Girardelli	Luxembourg	120	(44)	20	-	25	25	(20)	-	25	(15)	-	25	(9)
2	Pirmin Zurbriggen	Switzerland	102	(22)	25	12	(11)	20	-	-	-	20	-	(11)	25
3	Thomas Bürgler	Switzerland	90	(21)	15	(7)	10	(8)	25	-	(6)	25	-	-	15
4	Robert Erlacher	Italy	73	(13)	(7)	25	8	(6)	-	-	-	10	-	10	20
5	Martin Hangl	Switzerland	69		-	20	9	15	15	10	-	-	-	-	-
6	Hans Enn	Austria	67	(3)	9	-	12	12	-	25	-	(3)	-	9	-
7	Richard Pramotton	Italy	57	(10)	9	15	-	(3)	10	15	-	8	-	(5)	(2)
8	Max Julen	Switzerland	56	(2)	4	10	15	-	-	12	-	(2)	-	15	-
9	Markus Wasmeier	West Germany	52	(3)	12	4	20	4	-	-	-	-	-	(3)	12
10	Ingemar Stenmark	Sweden	49		-	-	3	-	7	7	-	12	-	20	-
	Hubert Strolz	Austria	49		-	-	6	-	6	20	-	-	-	6	11
12	Jure Franko	Yugoslavia	46	(16)	11	(6)	-	7	9	9	(3)	(7)	-	-	10
13	Joël Gaspoz	Switzerland	37		2	11	-	-	11	5	-	-	-	8	-
14	Andreas Wenzel	Liechtenstein	31		1	-	-	10	-	-	20	-	-	-	-
	Peter Roth	West Germany	31		10	-	-	-	-	-	10	-	7	-	4
16	Alex Giorgi	Italy	28		-	5	4	-	2	-	-	5	-	12	-
	Rok Petrović	Yugoslavia	28		-	-	-	-	3	-	-	11	-	7	7
18	Oswald Tötsch	Italy	27	(1)	6	8	2	-	-	3	8	-	-	-	(1)
19	Michael Eder	West Germany	26		4	1	-	-	-	-	11	-	-	4	6
20	Steven Lee	Australia	25		-	-	-	-	-	-	-	-	25	-	-
	Daniel Mahrer	Switzerland	25		-	-	-	-	-	-	-	-	25	-	-
22	Bojan Križaj	Yugoslavia	22		-	-	-	-	5	6	-	9	-	2	-
23	Ivano Marzola	Italy	21		-	-	-	9	-	-	-	-	12	-	-
24	Franz Gruber	Austria	17		-	9	-	-	8	-	-	-	-	-	-
	Ernst Riedlsperger	Austria	17		-	-	5	-	-	-	7	-	-	-	5
26	Guido Hinterseer	Austria	16		5	-	-	11	-	-	-	-	-	-	-
	Günther Mader	Austria	16		-	-	-	-	12	4	-	-	-	-	-
28	Hans Stuffer	West Germany	15		-	-	-	-	-	-	15	-	-	-	-
	Hans Pieren	Switzerland	15		-	-	-	-	-	11	-	4	-	-	-
	Brian Stemmle	Canada	15		-	-	-	-	-	-	-	-	15	-	-
31	Peter Lüscher	Switzerland	12		-	-	-	-	-	-	12	-	-	-	-
32	Michael Mair	Italy	11		-	-	-	-	-	-	-	-	11	-	-
	Franck Piccard	France	11		-	-	1	2	-	-	-	-	-	-	8
34	Joachim Buchner	Austria	10		-	-	7	-	-	-	3	-	-	-	-
	Karl Alpiger	Switzerland	10		-	-	-	-	-	-	-	-	10	-	-
36	Bernhard Gstrein	Austria	9		-	4	-	5	-	-	-	-	-	-	-
	Franz Heinzer	Switzerland	9		-	-	-	-	-	-	9	-	-	-	-
	Boris Strel	Yugoslavia	9		-	-	-	-	-	8	-	1	-	-	-
	Sepp Wildgruber	West Germany	9		-	-	-	-	-	-	-	-	9	-	-
40	Giacomo Erlacher	Italy	8		-	-	-	-	-	-	-	-	8	-	-
41	Bernd Felbinger	West Germany	6		-	-	-	-	-	2	4	-	-	-	-
	Jörgen Sundqvist	Sweden	6		-	-	-	-	-	-	-	6	-	-	-
	Herbert Renoth	West Germany	6		-	-	-	-	-	-	-	-	6	-	-
44	Jacques Lüthy	Switzerland	5		-	-	-	-	-	-	5	-	-	-	-
	Alberto Ghidoni	Italy	5		-	-	-	-	-	-	-	-	5	-	-
46	Peter Namberger	West Germany	4		-	-	-	-	4	-	-	-	-	-	-
	Peter Müller	Switzerland	4		-	-	-	1	-	-	3	-	-	-	-
	Rudolf Huber	Austria	4		-	-	-	-	-	-	-	-	4	-	-
49	Bill Johnson	United States	3		-	-	-	-	-	-	-	-	3	-	-
	Thomas Stangassinger	Austria	3		-	-	-	-	-	-	-	-	-	-	3
51	Anton Steiner	Austria	2		-	2	-	-	-	-	-	-	-	-	-
	Doug Lewis	United States	2		-	-	-	-	-	-	-	-	2	-	-
53	Yves Tavernier	France	1		-	-	-	-	1	-	-	-	-	-	-
	Jürgen Grabher	Austria	1		-	-	-	-	-	1	-	-	-	-	-
	Philippe Verneret	France	1		-	-	-	-	-	-	-	-	1	-	-
	Tiger Shaw	United States	1		-	-	-	-	-	-	-	-	-	1	-

Alpine Skiing World Cup
Men

Overall | Downhill | Giant/Super G | Slalom | Combined

1985
