= 1984 Alpine Skiing World Cup – Men's giant slalom and super-G =

1984 Men's giant slalom and Super G World Cup
Previous: 1983	Next: 1985

Men's giant slalom and Super G World Cup 1983/1984

== Calendar ==
Round	Race No	Discipline	Place	Country	Date	Winner	Second	Third
1	4	Super G	Val d'Isère	France	December 10, 1983	(Austria) Hans Enn	(Switzerland) Pirmin Zurbriggen	(Socialist Federal Republic of Yugoslavia) Jure Franko
2	6	Giant	Les Diablerets	Switzerland	December 12, 1983	(Switzerland) Max Julen	(Switzerland) Pirmin Zurbriggen	(Socialist Federal Republic of Yugoslavia) Jure Franko
3	9	Super G	Madonna di Campiglio	Italy	December 19, 1983	(Switzerland) Pirmin Zurbriggen	(Switzerland) Martin Hangl	(Austria) Leonhard Stock
4	13	Giant	Adelboden	Switzerland	January 10, 1984	(Sweden) Ingemar Stenmark	(Austria) Hubert Strolz	(Switzerland) Pirmin Zurbriggen
5	21	Giant	Kirchberg in Tirol	Austria	January 23, 1984	(Sweden) Ingemar Stenmark	(Luxembourg) Marc Girardelli	(Sweden) Jörgen Sundqvist
6	23	Super G	Garmisch-Partenkirchen	West Germany	January 29, 1984	(Liechtenstein) Andreas Wenzel	(Switzerland) Pirmin Zurbriggen	(Austria) Hans Enn
7	26	Giant	Borovets	Bulgaria	February 4, 1984	(Sweden) Ingemar Stenmark	(Luxembourg) Marc Girardelli	(Italy) Robert Erlacher
8	29	Giant	Aspen	United States	March 5, 1984	(Switzerland) Pirmin Zurbriggen	(Luxembourg) Marc Girardelli	(United States) Phil Mahre
9	31	Giant	Vail	United States	March 7, 1984	(Sweden) Ingemar Stenmark	(Switzerland) Pirmin Zurbriggen	(Austria) Hans Enn
10	33	Giant	Åre	Sweden	March 17, 1984	(Austria) Hans Enn	(Austria) Hubert Strolz	(Sweden) Ingemar Stenmark
11	35	Super G	Oppdal	Norway	March 20, 1984	(Switzerland) Pirmin Zurbriggen	(Luxembourg) Marc Girardelli	(Socialist Federal Republic of Yugoslavia) Jure Franko
12	36	Giant	Oslo	Norway	March 23, 1984	(Austria) Hans Enn	(Italy) Alex Giorgi	(Switzerland) Thomas Bürgler

== Final point standings ==
In men's giant slalom and Super G World Cup 1983/84 the best 5 results count. Deduction are given in ().

Place	Name	Country	Total points	Deduction	4 (France) SG	6 (Switzerland)	9 (Italy) SG	13 (Switzerland)	21 (Austria)	23 (Germany) SG	26 (Bulgaria)	29 (United States)	31 (United States)	33 (Sweden)	35 (Norway) SG	36 (Norway)
1	Ingemar Stenmark	Sweden	115	(31)	-	(9)	-	25	25	(11)	25	-	25	15	-	(11)
	Pirmin Zurbriggen	Switzerland	115	(67)	20	20	25	(15)	-	(20)	-	25	(20)	(10)	25	(12)
3	Hans Enn	Austria	105	(46)	25	(12)	(12)	(10)	-	15	-	-	15	25	(12)	25
4	Marc Girardelli	Luxembourg	92	(29)	(4)	-	-	12	20	(12)	20	20	-	(12)	20	-
5	Jure Franko	Yugoslavia	68	(26)	15	15	(8)	11	12	(9)	-	-	-	-	15	(9)
6	Hubert Strolz	Austria	65	(18)	-	8	(6)	20	(4)	(5)	8	-	(2)	20	9	(1)
7	Max Julen	Switzerland	60	(5)	8	25	-	9	-	-	-	-	12	(4)	(1)	6
8	Andreas Wenzel	Liechtenstein	58	(8)	(3)	(5)	10	-	-	25	6	-	-	-	10	7
9	Thomas Bürgler	Switzerland	54	(29)	(6)	10	(7)	(4)	10	-	9	10	(6)	-	(6)	15
10	Guido Hinterseer	Austria	49	(18)	-	(6)	11	8	11	10	-	-	9	-	(7)	(5)
	Martin Hangl	Switzerland	49	(5)	-	7	20	-	-	(3)	(2)	12	-	5	5	-
	Alex Giorgi	Italy	49	(4)	-	-	-	-	7	-	-	9	(4)	8	5	20
13	Robert Erlacher	Italy	42		-	-	-	-	-	8	15	11	-	8	-	2
14	Boris Strel	Yugoslavia	39	(4)	-	(4)	-	5	5	-	12	-	8	9	-	-
15	Günther Mader	Austria	37		9	11	3	-	-	7	-	7	-	-	-	-
16	Joël Gaspoz	Switzerland	35		1	-	-	-	-	-	-	4	11	11	-	8
17	Bojan Križaj	Yugoslavia	34	(12)	5	(3)	-	6	(1)	(2)	5	(3)	10	8	-	(3)
18	Franz Heinzer	Switzerland	26		11	-	10	-	-	5	-	-	-	-	-	-
19	Phil Mahre	United States	24		-	-	-	-	9	-	-	15	-	-	-	-
20	Egon Hirt	West Germany	23		-	-	-	-	6	6	4	-	-	3	-	4
21	Jacques Lüthy	Switzerland	22		10	-	-	1	-	-	10	1	-	-	-	-
22	Franz Gruber	Austria	19		-	2	-	7	-	-	-	8	-	2	-	-
23	Jörgen Sundqvist	Sweden	18		-	2	-	-	15	-	-	-	1	-	-	-
24	Leonhard Stock	Austria	17		2	-	15	-	-	-	-	-	-	-	-	-
25	Jože Kuralt	Yugoslavia	13		-	-	2	-	-	-	11	-	-	-	-	-
26	Franck Piccard	France	12		12	-	-	-	-	-	-	-	-	-	-	-
27	Tiger Shaw	United States	11		-	-	-	3	-	-	-	5	3	-	-	-
	Markus Wasmeier	West Germany	11		-	-	-	-	-	-	-	-	-	-	11	-
	Christian Orlainsky	Austria	11		-	-	-	-	-	-	-	-	-	1	-	10
30	Ernst Riedlsperger	Austria	9		-	-	5	-	3	-	1	-	-	-	-	-
	Steve Mahre	United States	9		-	-	-	-	-	-	-	2	7	-	-	-
	Peter Müller	Switzerland	9		-	-	-	-	-	1	-	-	-	-	8	-
33	Johan Wallner	Sweden	8		-	-	-	-	8	-	-	-	-	-	-	-
34	Peter Roth	West Germany	7		7	-	-	-	-	-	-	-	-	-	-	-
	Oswald Tötsch	Italy	7		-	-	-	-	-	-	7	-	-	-	-	-
36	Richard Pramotton	Italy	6		-	-	-	-	-	-	-	6	-	-	-	-
37	Paul Frommelt	Liechtenstein	5		-	-	-	-	-	-	-	-	5	-	-	-
38	Anton Steiner	Austria	4		-	-	4	-	-	-	-	-	-	-	-	-
39	Odd Sørli	Norway	3		-	-	-	-	-	-	3	-	-	-	-	-
	Bruno Kernen	Switzerland	3		-	-	-	-	-	-	-	-	-	-	3	-
41	Niklas Henning	Sweden	2		-	-	-	2	-	-	-	-	-	-	-	-
	Grega Benedik	Yugoslavia	2		-	-	-	-	2	-	-	-	-	-	-	-
	Siegfried Kerschbaumer	Italy	2		-	-	-	-	-	-	-	-	-	-	2	-
44	Riccardo Foppa	Italy	1		-	-	1	-	-	-	-	-	-	-	-	-

Alpine Skiing World Cup
Men

Overall | Downhill | Giant/Super G | Slalom | Combined

1984
