= 1984 Alpine Skiing World Cup – Men's combined =

1984 Combined World Cup
Previous: 1983	Next: 1985

Men's combined World Cup 1983/1984

== Calendar ==
Round	Race No	Discipline	Place	Country	Date	Winner	Second	Third
1	5	Donwhill; Super G	Val d'Isère	France	December 19, 1983; December 10, 1983	(Switzerland) Franz Heinzer	(Switzerland) Pirmin Zurbriggen	(Austria) Leonhard Stock
2	11	Super G Slalom	Madonna di Campiglio	Italy	December 19, 1983; December 20, 1983	(Liechtenstein) Andreas Wenzel	(Switzerland) Thomas Bürgler	(Italy) Alex Giorgi
3	17	Downhill; Slalom	Wengen; Parpan	Switzerland; Switzerland	January 15, 1984; January 17, 1984	(Liechtenstein) Andreas Wenzel	(Austria) Anton Steiner	(Switzerland) Peter Lüscher
4	20	Downhill; Slalom	Kitzbühel	Austria	January 21, 1984; January 22, 1984	(Austria) Anton Steiner	(Switzerland) Pirmin Zurbriggen	(United States) Phil Mahre
5	24	Downhill; Super G	Garmisch-Partenkirchen	West Germany	January 28, 1984; January 29, 1984	(Switzerland) Pirmin Zurbriggen	(Liechtenstein) Andreas Wenzel	(Switzerland) Peter Müller

== Final point standings ==
In men's combined World Cup 1983/84 all five results count.

Place	Name	Country	Total points	5 (France)	11 (Italy)	17 (Switzerland)	20 (Austria)	24 (Germany)
1	Andreas Wenzel	Liechtenstein	90	10	25	25	10	20
2	Pirmin Zurbriggen	Switzerland	65	20	-	-	20	25
3	Anton Steiner	Austria	54	-	9	20	25	-
4	Franz Heinzer	Switzerland	37	25	-	-	-	12
5	Thomas Bürgler	Switzerland	28	-	20	-	-	8
6	Urs Räber	Switzerland	24	9	-	-	11	4
7	Guido Hinterseer	Austria	21	-	-	-	12	9
8	Silvano Meli	Switzerland	20	-	-	11	9	-
9	Bruno Kernen	Switzerland	19	12	-	-	7	-
10	Peter Šoltys	Czechoslovakia	16	-	-	10	6	-
11	Leonhard Stock	Austria	15	15	-	-	-	-
	Alex Giorgi	Italy	15	-	15	-	-	-
	Peter Lüscher	Switzerland	15	-	-	15	-	-
	Phil Mahre	United States	15	-	-	-	15	-
	Peter Müller	Switzerland	15	-	-	-	-	15
16	Franz Gruber	Austria	12	-	12	-	-	-
	Miroslav Kolář	Czechoslovakia	12	-	-	12	-	-
18	Ivano Marzola	Italy	11	11	-	-	-	-
	Günther Mader	Austria	11	-	11	-	-	-
	Helmut Höflehner	Austria	11	-	-	-	-	11
21	Martin Hangl	Switzerland	10	-	10	-	-	-
	Stefan Niederseer	Austria	10	-	-	-	-	10
23	Hubertus von Hohenlohe	Mexico	9	-	-	9	-	-
24	Frédéric Ancey	France	8	8	-	-	-	-
	Robert Erlacher	Italy	8	-	8	-	-	-
	Shinya Chiba	Japan	8	-	-	-	8	-
27	Philippe Verneret	France	7	7	-	-	-	-
	Jure Franko	Yugoslavia	7	-	7	-	-	-
	Daniel Mahrer	Switzerland	7	-	-	-	-	7
	Klaus Gattermann	West Germany	7	4	-	-	-	3
31	Oskar Delago	Italy	6	6	-	-	-	-
	Bojan Križaj	Yugoslavia	6	-	6	-	-	-
	Markus Wasmeier	West Germany	6	-	-	-	-	6
34	Marc Girardelli	Luxembourg	5	5	-	-	-	-
	Petar Popangelov	Bulgaria	5	-	5	-	-	-
	András Völgyesi	Hungary	5	-	-	-	5	-
	Peter Roth	West Germany	5	-	-	-	-	5
38	Jože Kuralt	Yugoslavia	4	-	4	-	-	-
39	Peter Dürr	West Germany	3	3	-	-	-	-
	Tomaž Cerkovnik	Yugoslavia	3	-	3	-	-	-
41	Chris Kent	Canada	2	2	-	-	-	-
	Mitko Khadzhiev	Bulgaria	2	-	2	-	-	-
	Mike Brown	United States	2	-	-	-	-	2
44	Bernd Felbinger	West Germany	1	1	-	-	-	-
	Boris Strel	Yugoslavia	1	-	1	-	-	-
	Herbert Renoth	West Germany	1	-	-	-	-	1

Note:

Race 3 and 4 not all points were awarded (not enough finishers).

Alpine skiing World Cup
Men

Overall | Downhill | Giant/Super G | Slalom | Combined

1984
