= 1984–85 FIS Alpine Ski World Cup =

International sports competition

FIS Alpine Ski World Cup 1984/85
Discipline	Men	Women
Overall	(Luxembourg) Marc Girardelli	(Switzerland) Michela Figini
Downhill	(Austria) Helmut Höflehner	(Switzerland) Michela Figini
Giant slalom/super-G	(Luxembourg) Marc Girardelli	(West Germany) Marina Kiehl
Slalom	(Luxembourg) Marc Girardelli	(Switzerland) Erika Hess
Combined	(Liechtenstein) Andreas Wenzel	(Switzerland) Brigitte Örtli
Nations Cup	Switzerland	Switzerland
- Nations Cup overall: Switzerland

Competition
Locations	18	16
Individual	36	33

The 19th World Cup season began in December 1984 in Italy and concluded in March 1985 in the United States. The overall champions were Marc Girardelli of Luxembourg and Michela Figini of Switzerland; both were first-time champions.

A break in the schedule was for the 1985 World Championships, held in Bormio, northern Italy between January 31 and February 10, 1985. These were the first world championships held in an odd-numbered year. This was also the last year that super-G was included as part of the giant slalom discipline; beginning with the next season, super-G was treated as a separate discipline.

== Calendar ==
=== Men ===
Event key: DH – Downhill, SL – Slalom, GS – Giant slalom, SG – Super giant slalom, KB – Combined
Race	Season	Date	Place	Type	Winner	Second	Third
488	1	2 December 1984	(Italy) Sestriere	SL _{156}	(Luxembourg) Marc Girardelli	(Sweden) Jonas Nilsson	(Italy) Paolo De Chiesa
489	2	7 December 1984	(France) Puy St. Vincent	SG _{008}	(Switzerland) Pirmin Zurbriggen	(Luxembourg) Marc Girardelli	(Switzerland) Thomas Bürgler
490	3	8 December 1984	(France) Puy St. Vincent	GS _{145}	(Italy) Roberto Erlacher	(Switzerland) Martin Hangl	(Italy) Richard Pramotton
491	4	10 December 1984	(Italy) Sestriere	SL _{157}	(Switzerland) Pirmin Zurbriggen	(Italy) Paolo De Chiesa	(Italy) Ivano Edalini
492	5	11 December 1984	(Italy) Sestriere	GS _{146}	(Luxembourg) Marc Girardelli	(West Germany) Markus Wasmeier	(Switzerland) Max Julen
493	6	15 December 1984	(Italy) Val Gardena	DH _{144}	(Austria) Helmut Höflehner	(Switzerland) Conradin Cathomen	(Austria) Peter Wirnsberger
494	7	16 December 1984	(Italy) Madonna di Campiglio	SL _{158}	(Socialist Federal Republic of Yugoslavia) Bojan Križaj	(Liechtenstein) Andreas Wenzel	(Bulgaria) Petar Popangelov
495	8	17 December 1984	(Italy) Madonna di Campiglio	SG _{009}	(Luxembourg) Marc Girardelli	(Switzerland) Pirmin Zurbriggen	(Switzerland) Martin Hangl
496	9	17 December 1984	(Italy) Madonna di Campiglio	KB _{038}	(Liechtenstein) Andreas Wenzel	(Austria) Thomas Stangassinger	(Switzerland) Max Julen
497	10	4 January 1985	(West Germany) Bad Wiessee	SL _{159}	(Luxembourg) Marc Girardelli	(West Germany) Florian Beck	(Sweden) Ingemar Stenmark
498	11	6 January 1985	(France) La Mongie	SL _{160}	(Liechtenstein) Andreas Wenzel	(Sweden) Jonas Nilsson	(Liechtenstein) Paul Frommelt
499	12	8 January 1985	(Austria) Schladming	GS _{147}	(Switzerland) Thomas Bürgler	(Luxembourg) Marc Girardelli	(Switzerland) Martin Hangl
500	13	11 January 1985	(Austria) Kitzbühel	DH _{145}	(Switzerland) Pirmin Zurbriggen	(Switzerland) Franz Heinzer	(Austria) Peter Wirnsberger
501	14	8 December 1984; 11 January 1985	(France) Puy St. Vincent (GS) (Austria) Kitzbühel (DH1)	KB _{039}	(Switzerland) Pirmin Zurbriggen	(Switzerland) Franz Heinzer	(Liechtenstein) Andreas Wenzel
502	15	12 January 1985	(Austria) Kitzbühel	DH _{146}	(Switzerland) Pirmin Zurbriggen	(Austria) Helmut Höflehner	(Canada) Todd Brooker
503	16	13 January 1985	(Austria) Kitzbühel	SL _{161}	(Luxembourg) Marc Girardelli	(Italy) Oswald Totsch	(Socialist Federal Republic of Yugoslavia) Bojan Križaj
504	17	13 January 1985	(Austria) Kitzbühel	KB _{040}	(Liechtenstein) Andreas Wenzel	(Switzerland) Franz Heinzer	(France) Gerhard Rambaud
505	18	15 January 1985	(Switzerland) Adelboden	GS _{148}	(Austria) Hans Enn	(Austria) Hubert Strolz	(Italy) Richard Pramotton
506	19	18 January 1985	(Switzerland) Wengen	DH _{147}	(Austria) Helmut Höflehner	(Switzerland) Franz Heinzer	(Austria) Peter Wirnsberger
507	20	20 January 1985	(Switzerland) Wengen	DH _{148}	(Austria) Peter Wirnsberger	(Switzerland) Peter Lüscher	(Switzerland) Peter Müller
508	21	21 January 1985	(Switzerland) Wengen	SL _{162}	(Luxembourg) Marc Girardelli	(Sweden) Ingemar Stenmark	(Liechtenstein) Paul Frommelt
509	22	21 January 1985	(Switzerland) Wengen	KB _{041}	(France) Michel Vion	(West Germany) Peter Roth	(Switzerland) Peter Lüscher
510	23	26 January 1985	(West Germany) Garmisch	DH _{149}	(Austria) Helmut Höflehner	(Switzerland) Peter Müller	(Austria) Anton Steiner
511	24	27 January 1985	(West Germany) Garmisch	SG _{010}	(Luxembourg) Marc Girardelli	(Liechtenstein) Andreas Wenzel	(West Germany) Hans Stuffer
512	25	27 January 1985	(West Germany) Garmisch	KB _{042}	(Switzerland) Peter Müller	(Switzerland) Peter Lüscher	(Switzerland) Franz Heinzer
1985 World Championships (31 January–10 February)
513	26	14 February 1985	(Austria) Bad Kleinkirchheim	DH _{150}	(Switzerland) Karl Alpiger	(Switzerland) Peter Müller	(Austria) Stefan Niederseer
514	27	15 February 1985	(Socialist Federal Republic of Yugoslavia) Kranjska Gora	GS _{149}	(Switzerland) Thomas Bürgler	(Switzerland) Pirmin Zurbriggen	(Luxembourg) Marc Girardelli
515	28	16 February 1985	(Socialist Federal Republic of Yugoslavia) Kranjska Gora	SL _{163}	(Luxembourg) Marc Girardelli	(Sweden) Ingemar Stenmark	(Liechtenstein) Paul Frommelt (Sweden) Jonas Nilsson
516	29	2 March 1985	(Japan) Furano	DH _{151}	(Canada) Todd Brooker	(West Germany) Sepp Wildgruber	(Switzerland) Bruno Kernen
517	30	3 March 1985	(Japan) Furano	SG _{011}	(Switzerland) Daniel Mahrer (Australia) Steven Lee		(Canada) Brian Stemmle
518	31	9 March 1985	(United States) Aspen	DH _{152}	(Switzerland) Peter Müller	(Switzerland) Karl Alpiger	(West Germany) Sepp Wildgruber
519	32	10 March 1985	(United States) Aspen	GS _{150}	(Luxembourg) Marc Girardelli	(Sweden) Ingemar Stenmark	(Switzerland) Max Julen
520	33	16 March 1985	(Canada) Panorama	DH _{153}	(Switzerland) Peter Müller	(Switzerland) Daniel Mahrer	(Austria) Helmut Höflehner
521	34	17 March 1985	(Canada) Panorama	SG _{012}	(Switzerland) Pirmin Zurbriggen	(Italy) Roberto Erlacher	(Switzerland) Thomas Bürgler
522	35	20 March 1985	(United States) Park City	SL _{164}	(Luxembourg) Marc Girardelli	(Socialist Federal Republic of Yugoslavia) Rok Petrovič	(Liechtenstein) Paul Frommelt
523	36	23 March 1985	(United States) Heavenly Valley	SL _{165}	(Luxembourg) Marc Girardelli	(Liechtenstein) Paul Frommelt	(Austria) Robert Zoller

=== Women ===
Event key: DH – Downhill, SL – Slalom, GS – Giant slalom, SG – Super giant slalom, KB – Combined
Race	Season	Date	Place	Type	Winner	Second	Third
455	1	1 December 1984	(Italy) Courmayeur	SL _{155}	(France) Perrine Pelen	(West Germany) Maria Epple	(Italy) Paoletta Magoni
456	2	6 December 1984	(France) Puy St. Vincent	DH _{124}	(Switzerland) Zoë Haas	(West Germany) Marina Kiehl	(West Germany) Irene Epple
457	3	8 December 1984	(Switzerland) Davos	SG _{005}	(West Germany) Traudl Hächer	(Switzerland) Maria Walliser	(West Germany) Marina Kiehl
458	4	9 December 1984	(Switzerland) Davos	SL _{156}	(France) Christelle Guignard	(Switzerland) Erika Hess	(France) Hélène Barbier
459	5	9 December 1984	(Switzerland) Davos	KB _{037}	(Switzerland) Brigitte Örtli	(Switzerland) Erika Hess	(West Germany) Traudl Hächer
460	6	14 December 1984	(Italy) Madonna di Campiglio	SL _{157}	(Poland) Dorota Tlałka	(Switzerland) Brigitte Gadient	(France) Christelle Guignard
461	7	15 December 1984	(Italy) Madonna di Campiglio	GS _{137}	(West Germany) Marina Kiehl	(Switzerland) Maria Walliser	(Switzerland) Zoë Haas
462	8	17 December 1984	(Italy) Santa Caterina	GS _{138}	(Switzerland) Vreni Schneider	(United States) Tamara McKinney	(West Germany) Maria Epple
463	9	21 December 1984	(Italy) Santa Caterina	DH _{125}	(Austria) Elisabeth Kirchler	(Austria) Veronika Vitzthum	(Austria) Katrin Gutensohn
464	10	4 January 1985	(Socialist Federal Republic of Yugoslavia) Maribor	GS _{139}	(Switzerland) Michela Figini	(Switzerland) Vreni Schneider	(Spain) Blanca Fernández Ochoa
465	11	5 January 1985	(Socialist Federal Republic of Yugoslavia) Maribor	SL _{158}	(United States) Tamara McKinney	(Czechoslovakia) Olga Charvátová	(Switzerland) Brigitte Gadient
466	12	9 January 1985	(Austria) Bad Kleinkirchheim	DH _{126}	(Switzerland) Michela Figini	(Switzerland) Brigitte Örtli	(Switzerland) Ariane Ehrat
467	13	17 December 1984; 9 January 1985	(Italy) Santa Caterina (GS) (Austria) Bad Kleinkirchheim (DH1)	KB _{038}	(Switzerland) Michela Figini	(West Germany) Marina Kiehl	(Switzerland) Maria Walliser
468	14	10 January 1985	(Austria) Bad Kleinkirchheim	DH _{127}	(Switzerland) Michela Figini	(Switzerland) Brigitte Örtli	(Switzerland) Maria Walliser
469	15	11 January 1985	(Austria) Bad Kleinkirchheim	SL _{159}	(France) Christelle Guignard	(Italy) Maria Rosa Quario	(Switzerland) Erika Hess
470	16	11 January 1985	(Austria) Bad Kleinkirchheim	KB _{039}	(Switzerland) Brigitte Örtli	(Switzerland) Maria Walliser	(Czechoslovakia) Olga Charvátová
471	17	13 January 1985	(West Germany) Pfronten	SG _{006}	(Switzerland) Michela Figini	(West Germany) Marina Kiehl	(Switzerland) Maria Walliser
472	18	14 January 1985	(West Germany) Pfronten	SL _{160}	(Italy) Paoletta Magoni	(Switzerland) Brigitte Örtli	(Italy) Daniela Zini
473	19	20 January 1985	(France) St. Gervais	DH _{128}	(Switzerland) Michela Figini	(France) Catherine Quittet	(France) Claudine Emonet
474	20	21 January 1985	(France) St. Gervais	GS _{140}	(Switzerland) Michela Figini	(Austria) Elisabeth Kirchler	(France) Anne Flore Rey
475	21	25 January 1985	(Switzerland) Arosa	SL _{161}	(West Germany) Maria Epple	(United States) Tamara McKinney	(Switzerland) Erika Hess
476	22	26 January 1985	(Switzerland) Arosa	SG _{007}	(West Germany) Marina Kiehl	(United States) Eva Twardokens	(Switzerland) Michela Figini
1985 World Championships (31 January–10 February)
477	23	2 March 1985	(United States) Vail	DH _{129}	(Austria) Katrin Gutensohn	(Switzerland) Brigitte Örtli	(Switzerland) Maria Walliser
478	24	3 March 1985	(United States) Vail	GS _{141}	(Spain) Blanca Fernández Ochoa	(Switzerland) Maria Walliser	(Switzerland) Zoë Haas (Switzerland) Vreni Schneider
479	25	8 March 1985	(Canada) Sunshine	DH _{130}	(Switzerland) Maria Walliser	(Switzerland) Michela Figini	(Canada) Laurie Graham
480	26	25 January 1985; 8 March 1985	(Switzerland) Arosa (SL) (Canada) Sunshine (DH1)	KB _{040}	(Switzerland) Michela Figini	(Czechoslovakia) Olga Charvátová	(Switzerland) Maria Walliser
481	27	9 March 1985	(Canada) Sunshine	DH _{131}	(Canada) Laurie Graham	(Switzerland) Michela Figini	(Switzerland) Maria Walliser
482	28	10 March 1985	(Canada) Sunshine	SG _{008}	(West Germany) Marina Kiehl	(Switzerland) Michela Figini	(Switzerland) Brigitte Örtli
	29	13 March 1985	(United States) Lake Placid	GS	(United States) Diann Roffe	(Socialist Federal Republic of Yugoslavia) Mateja Svet	(West Germany) Marina Kiehl
484	30	16 March 1985	(United States) Waterville Valley	SL _{162}	(United States) Tamara McKinney	(Italy) Maria Rosa Quario	(Austria) Anni Kronbichler
	31	17 March 1985	(United States) Waterville Valley	GS	(Switzerland) Vreni Schneider	(United States) Diann Roffe	(West Germany) Traudl Hächer
486	32	19 March 1985	(United States) Park City	SL _{163}	(Switzerland) Erika Hess	(France) Perrine Pelen	(Italy) Maria Rosa Quario
487	33	22 March 1985	(United States) Heavenly Valley	SL _{164}	(Switzerland) Erika Hess	(France) Perrine Pelen	(Poland) Małgorzata Tlałka

== Men ==
=== Overall ===
In men's overall World Cup 1984/85 the best five downhills, best five giant slaloms/super-G, best five slaloms and best three combined count. 27 racers had a point deduction.

Place	Name	Country	Total	DH	GS SG	SL	KB
1	Marc Girardelli	Luxembourg	262	17	120	125	0
2	Pirmin Zurbriggen	Switzerland	244	79	102	38	25
3	Andreas Wenzel	Liechtenstein	172	1	31	75	65
4	Peter Müller	Switzerland	156	105	4	0	47
5	Franz Heinzer	Switzerland	137	73	9	0	55
6	Ingemar Stenmark	Sweden	135	0	49	78	8
7	Thomas Bürgler	Switzerland	131	0	90	16	25
8	Helmut Höflehner	Austria	116	110	0	0	6
9	Peter Wirnsberger	Austria	111	80	0	0	31
10	Bojan Križaj	Yugoslavia	101	0	22	69	10
	Daniel Mahrer	Switzerland	101	59	25	0	17
	Markus Wasmeier	West Germany	101	17	52	0	32
13	Karl Alpiger	Switzerland	100	80	10	0	10
14	Max Julen	Switzerland	97	0	56	26	15
15	Martin Hangl	Switzerland	93	0	69	11	13
16	Peter Lüscher	Switzerland	92	41	12	0	39
	Oswald Tötsch	Italy	92	0	27	57	8
18	Robert Erlacher	Italy	91	0	73	18	0
19	Hans Enn	Austria	80	0	67	0	13
	Paul Frommelt	Liechtenstein	80	0	0	80	0

=== Downhill ===
see complete table

In men's downhill World Cup 1984/85 the best 5 results count. 11 racers had a point deduction, which are given in ().

Place	Name	Country	Total	6	13	15	19	20	23	26	29	31	33
1	Helmut Höflehner	Austria	110	25	(12)	20	25	(12)	25	(3)	(3)	(12)	15
2	Peter Müller	Switzerland	105	(4)	(11)	(11)	(8)	15	20	20	-	25	25
3	Peter Wirnsberger	Austria	80	15	15	10	15	25	(5)	-	(6)	(6)	-
	Karl Alpiger	Switzerland	80	11	(1)	(2)	(1)	(8)	12	25	12	20	(5)
5	Pirmin Zurbriggen	Switzerland	79	9	25	25	-	-	-	8	-	-	12
6	Franz Heinzer	Switzerland	73	(6)	20	12	20	(3)	(6)	10	-	11	(4)
7	Todd Brooker	Canada	60	-	-	15	(2)	7	8	-	25	5	-
8	Daniel Mahrer	Switzerland	59	-	(4)	8	-	10	-	11	10	(2)	20
9	Anton Steiner	Austria	57	10	-	-	12	(5)	15	12	-	(3)	8
10	Sepp Wildgruber	West Germany	53	2	-	-	5	11	-	-	20	15	-

=== Giant slalom / super-G ===
see complete table

In men's giant slalom and super-G World Cup 1984/85 the best 5 results count. Ten racers had a point deduction, which are given in (). Steven Lee and Daniel Mahrer shared the win in a strange race at Furano due to weather changes.

Place	Name	Country	Total	2SG	3	5	8SG	12	18	24SG	27	30SG	32	34SG
1	Marc Girardelli	Luxembourg	120	20	-	25	25	(20)	-	25	(15)	-	25	(9)
2	Pirmin Zurbriggen	Switzerland	102	25	12	(11)	20	-	-	-	20	-	(11)	25
3	Thomas Bürgler	Switzerland	90	15	(7)	10	(8)	25	-	(6)	25	-	-	15
4	Robert Erlacher	Italy	73	(7)	25	8	(6)	-	-	-	10	-	10	20
5	Martin Hangl	Switzerland	69	-	20	9	15	15	10	-	-	-	-	-
6	Hans Enn	Austria	67	9	-	12	12	-	25	-	(3)	-	9	-
7	Richard Pramotton	Italy	57	9	15	-	(3)	10	15	-	8	-	(5)	(2)
8	Max Julen	Switzerland	56	4	10	15	-	-	12	-	(2)	-	15	-
9	Markus Wasmeier	West Germany	52	12	4	20	4	-	-	-	-	-	(3)	12
10	Ingemar Stenmark	Sweden	49	-	-	3	-	7	7	-	12	-	20	-
	Hubert Strolz	Austria	49	-	-	6	-	6	20	-	-	-	6	11
12	Jure Franko	Yugoslavia	46	11	(6)	-	7	9	9	(3)	(7)	-	-	10
13	Joël Gaspoz	Switzerland	37	2	11	-	-	11	5	-	-	-	8	-
14	Andreas Wenzel	Liechtenstein	31	1	-	-	10	-	-	20	-	-	-	-
	Peter Roth	West Germany	31	10	-	-	-	-	-	10	-	7	-	4
16	Alex Giorgi	Italy	28	-	5	4	-	2	-	-	5	-	12	-
	Rok Petrović	Yugoslavia	28	-	-	-	-	3	-	-	11	-	7	7
18	Oswald Tötsch	Italy	27	6	8	2	-	-	3	8	-	-	-	(1)
19	Michael Eder	West Germany	26	4	1	-	-	-	-	11	-	-	4	6
20	Steven Lee	Australia	25	-	-	-	-	-	-	-	-	25	-	-
	Daniel Mahrer	Switzerland	25	-	-	-	-	-	-	-	-	25	-	-

=== Slalom ===
see complete table

In men's slalom World Cup 1984/85 the best 5 results count. Six racers had a point deduction, which are given in (). Marc Girardelli won seven races (five in a row) and won the cup with maximum points.

Place	Name	Country	Total	1	4	7	10	11	16	21	28	35	36
1	Marc Girardelli	Luxembourg	125	25	-	-	25	-	25	25	25	(25)	(25)
2	Paul Frommelt	Liechtenstein	80	-	-	-	-	15	-	15	15	15	20
3	Ingemar Stenmark	Sweden	78	-	-	12	15	11	(8)	20	20	-	-
4	Andreas Wenzel	Liechtenstein	75	-	11	20	9	25	10	-	-	-	-
5	Paolo De Chiesa	Italy	70	15	20	-	12	12	11	-	-	-	-
6	Bojan Križaj	Yugoslavia	69	-	7	25	11	-	15	11	-	-	-
7	Jonas Nilsson	Sweden	67	20	-	10	-	20	2	-	15	-	-
8	Oswald Tötsch	Italy	57	-	12	5	10	-	20	-	-	-	10
9	Ivano Edalini	Italy	53	9	15	(4)	-	-	6	-	11	12	-
10	Klaus Heidegger	Austria	51	12	-	9	-	-	(3)	8	10	-	12
11	Petar Popangelov	Bulgaria	46	-	6	15	-	-	-	6	(2)	10	9
12	Robert Zoller	Austria	44	-	9	8	-	-	-	12	-	-	15
	Alex Giorgi	Italy	44	-	-	-	(1)	9	12	10	-	5	8
14	Pirmin Zurbriggen	Switzerland	38	2	25	-	-	-	-	-	-	-	11

=== Combined ===
see complete table

In men's Combined World Cup 1984/85 all 5 results count.

Place	Name	Country	Total	9	14	17	22	25
1	Andreas Wenzel	Liechtenstein	76	25	15	25	-	11
2	Franz Heinzer	Switzerland	55	-	20	20	-	15
3	Peter Müller	Switzerland	52	-	11	11	5	25
4	Peter Lüscher	Switzerland	39	-	4	-	15	20
5	Markus Wasmeier	West Germany	32	-	12	-	11	9
6	Peter Wirnsberger	Austria	31	-	10	12	9	-
7	Gerhard Rambaud	France	27	-	-	15	12	-
8	Peter Roth	West Germany	26	-	-	-	20	6
9	Pirmin Zurbriggen	Switzerland	25	-	25	-	-	-
	Thomas Bürgler	Switzerland	25	12	9	-	-	4
	Michel Vion	France	25	-	-	-	25	-

== Women ==
=== Overall ===
see complete table

In women's overall World Cup 1984/85 the best four downhills, best four giant slaloms/super-G, best four slaloms and best three combined count. 31 racers had a point deduction.

Place	Name	Country	Total	DH	GS SG	SL	KB
1	Michela Figini	Switzerland	259	95	95	9	60
2	Brigitte Örtli	Switzerland	218	69	36	51	62
3	Maria Walliser	Switzerland	197	70	75	2	50
4	Marina Kiehl	West Germany	168	46	95	0	27
	Erika Hess	Switzerland	168	0	41	85	42
6	Olga Charvátová	Czechoslovakia	167	28	42	53	44
7	Elisabeth Kirchler	Austria	156	61	55	7	33
8	Tamara McKinney	United States	139	0	48	82	9
9	Vreni Schneider	Switzerland	112	0	85	18	9
10	Blanca Fernández Ochoa	Spain	108	0	58	32	18
11	Zoë Haas	Switzerland	107	42	52	3	10
12	Maria Epple	West Germany	106	0	43	63	0
	Perrine Pelen	France	106	0	29	77	0
14	Christelle Guignard	France	97	0	24	65	8
15	Traudl Hächer	West Germany	89	0	63	11	15
16	Eva Twardokens	United States	83	0	49	28	6
17	Laurie Graham	Canada	73	63	10	0	0
18	Michaela Gerg	West Germany	70	18	37	0	15
19	Maria Rosa Quario	Italy	65	0	0	65	0
20	Debbie Armstrong	United States	62	16	38	0	8

=== Downhill ===
see complete table

In women's downhill World Cup 1984/85 the best five results count. Six racers had a point deduction, which are given in ().

Place	Name	Country	Total	2	9	12	14	19	23	25	27
1	Michela Figini	Switzerland	115	(5)	(12)	25	25	25	-	20	20
2	Maria Walliser	Switzerland	81	(8)	-	11	15	(11)	15	25	15
3	Brigitte Örtli	Switzerland	76	-	-	20	20	-	20	7	9
4	Laurie Graham	Canada	73	-	(6)	10	11	-	12	15	25
5	Elisabeth Kirchler	Austria	71	12	25	12	12	-	(9)	10	-
6	Katrin Gutensohn	Austria	63	4	15	(2)	8	-	25	11	-
7	Marina Kiehl	West Germany	48	20	10	9	-	-	-	2	7
8	Ariane Ehrat	Switzerland	45	11	5	15	6	-	-	8	(4)
9	Zoë Haas	Switzerland	42	25	5	1	-	-	-	-	11
10	Catherine Quittet	France	33	-	8	-	-	20	-	5	-

=== Giant slalom / super-G ===
see complete table

In women's giant slalom and super-G World Cup 1983/84 the best 5 results count. 11 racers had a point deduction, which are given in (). Marina Kiehl and Michela Figini each finished with 110 points and each won three races during the year, so the second tiebreak (best sixth result) needed to be used, which awarded the discipline victory to Kiehl (15 points to 8).

Place	Name	Country	Total	3SG	7	8	10	17SG	20	22SG	24	28SG	29	31
1	Marina Kiehl	West Germany	110	15	25	(11)	-	20	-	25	(4)	25	(15)	(8)
2	Michela Figini	Switzerland	110	-	(8)	(5)	25	25	25	15	(5)	20	-	-
3	Vreni Schneider	Switzerland	88	-	3	25	20	(1)	-	-	15	-	-	25
4	Maria Walliser	Switzerland	87	20	20	(1)	12	15	(3)	(9)	20	(7)	(5)	(12)
5	Traudl Hächer	West Germany	71	25	(5)	-	-	(4)	8	-	11	-	12	15
6	Elisabeth Kirchler	Austria	65	11	12	-	-	12	20	-	10	-	-	-
7	Blanca Fernández Ochoa	Spain	63	-	-	-	15	10	5	8	25	(4)	(3)	-
8	Zoë Haas	Switzerland	62	-	15	10	10	-	-	(1)	15	12	-	-
9	Diann Roffe	United States	57	-	7	4	-	-	1	-	-	-	25	20
10	Eva Twardokens	United States	56	-	-	7	(6)	7	-	20	-	11	(1)	11

=== Slalom ===
see complete table

In women's slalom World Cup 1984/85 the best 5 results count. Nine racers had a point deduction, which are given in (). Erika Hess won her fourth Slalom World Cup.

Place	Name	Country	Total	1	4	6	11	15	18	21	30	32	33
1	Erika Hess	Switzerland	100	(11)	20	-	(12)	15	-	15	(5)	25	25
2	Tamara McKinney	United States	93	12	-	-	25	-	-	20	25	-	11
3	Perrine Pelen	France	89	25	(5)	12	(11)	-	-	12	(11)	20	20
4	Maria Rosa Quario	Italy	75	10	-	-	-	20	-	10	20	15	-
5	Maria Epple	West Germany	67	20	4	9	-	-	-	25	-	9	-
	Brigitte Gadient	Switzerland	67	(5)	(1)	20	15	12	-	-	8	-	12
7	Christelle Guignard	France	65	-	25	15	-	25	-	-	-	-	-
8	Paoletta Magoni	Italy	64	15	-	-	9	(5)	25	6	(4)	-	9
9	Olga Charvátová	Czechoslovakia	60	-	10	11	20	7	12	(5)	(2)	-	-
10	Brigitte Örtli	Switzerland	58	-	11	(6)	-	(6)	20	7	12	-	8

=== Combined ===
see complete table

In women's Combined World Cup 1984/85 all 4 results count. All four events were won by athletes from Switzerland.

Place	Name	Country	Total	5	13	16	26
1	Brigitte Örtli	Switzerland	74	25	12	25	12
2	Michela Figini	Switzerland	60	-	25	10	25
3	Maria Walliser	Switzerland	50	-	15	20	15
4	Olga Charvátová	Czechoslovakia	47	9	3	15	20
5	Erika Hess	Switzerland	44	20	2	11	11
6	Elisabeth Kirchler	Austria	33	10	11	12	-
7	Marina Kiehl	West Germany	27	7	20	-	-
8	Blanca Fernández Ochoa	Spain	18	-	-	8	10
9	Traudl Hächer	West Germany	15	15	-	-	-
	Michaela Gerg	West Germany	15	11	4	-	-

== Nations Cup ==
=== Overall ===
Place	Country	Total	Men	Women
1	Switzerland	3018	1489	1529
2	Austria	1383	871	512
3	West Germany	1011	356	655
4	Italy	892	672	220
5	France	593	162	431
6	United States	515	67	448
7	Luxembourg	356	356	0
8	Yugoslavia	321	243	78
9	Sweden	293	243	50
10	Liechtenstein	281	263	18
11	Canada	265	82	183
12	Czechoslovakia	211	5	206
13	Spain	121	0	121
14	Poland	94	0	94
15	Bulgaria	59	59	0
16	Australia	41	41	0
17	Japan	34	34	0
18	Soviet Union	15	15	0
19	Norway	13	13	0
20	Netherlands	5	0	5

=== Men ===
Place	Country	Total	DH	GS SG	SL	KB	Racers	Wins
1	Switzerland	1489	636	485	98	270	16	13
2	Austria	871	406	214	153	98	23	5
3	Italy	672	113	255	274	30	15	1
4	Luxembourg	356	17	164	175	0	1	11
	West Germany	356	82	146	67	61	12	0
6	Liechtenstein	263	1	31	155	76	2	3
7	Yugoslavia	243	0	121	108	14	6	1
	Sweden	243	0	55	178	10	6	0
9	France	162	11	13	73	65	8	1
10	Canada	82	67	15	0	0	4	1
11	United States	67	29	6	32	0	9	0
12	Bulgaria	59	0	0	48	11	1	0
13	Australia	41	16	25	0	0	1	1
14	Japan	34	0	0	25	9	4	0
15	Soviet Union	15	7	0	0	8	2	0
16	Norway	13	0	0	0	13	2	0
17	Czechoslovakia	5	0	0	0	5	2	0

=== Women ===
Place	Country	Total	DH	GS SG	SL	KB	Racers	Wins
1	Switzerland	1529	401	518	350	260	14	16
2	West Germany	655	104	383	84	84	11	5
3	Austria	512	263	81	116	52	17	2
4	United States	448	51	242	132	23	11	3
5	France	431	95	118	204	14	10	3
6	Italy	220	11	8	193	8	7	1
7	Czechoslovakia	206	38	44	77	47	4	0
8	Canada	183	145	12	0	26	7	1
9	Spain	121	0	70	33	18	1	1
10	Poland	94	0	0	94	0	2	1
11	Yugoslavia	78	0	41	37	0	3	0
12	Sweden	50	0	8	42	0	4	0
13	Liechtenstein	18	0	0	18	0	1	0
14	Netherlands	5	0	0	0	5	1	0
