= 1984 Alpine Skiing World Cup – Men's slalom =

1984 Men's Slalom World Cup
Previous: 1983	Next: 1985

This is a list of statistics for the Men's slalom in the World Cup 1983/1984.

== Calendar ==
Round	Race No	Place	Country	Date	Winner	Second	Third
1	1	Kranjska Gora	Yugoslavia	December 2, 1983	(Liechtenstein) Andreas Wenzel	(Bulgaria) Petar Popangelov	(Liechtenstein) Paul Frommelt
2	7	Courmayeur	Italy	December 13, 1983	(Sweden) Ingemar Stenmark	(Socialist Federal Republic of Yugoslavia) Bojan Križaj	(United States) Steve Mahre
3	10	Madonna di Campiglio	Italy	December 20, 1983	(Sweden) Ingemar Stenmark	(Austria) Robert Zoller	(Bulgaria) Petar Popangelov
4	15	Parpan	Switzerland	January 16, 1984	(Luxembourg) Marc Girardelli	(Italy) Paolo De Chiesa	(Liechtenstein) Andreas Wenzel
5	16	Parpan	Switzerland	January 17, 1984	(Sweden) Ingemar Stenmark	(Luxembourg) Marc Girardelli	(Austria) Franz Gruber
6	19	Kitzbühel	Austria	January 22, 1984	(Luxembourg) Marc Girardelli	(Austria) Franz Gruber	(Socialist Federal Republic of Yugoslavia) Bojan Križaj
7	27	Borovets	Bulgaria	February 5, 1984	(Luxembourg) Marc Girardelli	(Sweden) Ingemar Stenmark	(Austria) Franz Gruber
8	30	Vail	United States	March 6, 1984	(Austria) Robert Zoller	(Bulgaria) Petar Popangelov	(United States) Phil Mahre (Sweden) Lars-Göran Halvarsson
9	34	Åre	Sweden	March 18, 1984	(Luxembourg) Marc Girardelli	(Austria) Franz Gruber	(Sweden) Lars-Göran Halvarsson
10	37	Oslo	Norway	March 24, 1984	(Luxembourg) Marc Girardelli	(Sweden) Ingemar Stenmark	(Italy) Paolo De Chiesa

== Final point standings ==
In men's slalom World Cup 1983/84 the best 5 results count. Deduction are given in ().

Place	Name	Country	Total points	Deduction	1 (Socialist Federal Republic of Yugoslavia)	7 (Italy)	10 (Italy)	15 (Switzerland)	16 (Switzerland)	19 (Austria)	27 (Bulgaria)	30 (United States)	34 (Sweden)	37 (Norway)
1	Marc Girardelli	Luxembourg	125	(20)	-	-	-	25	(20)	25	25	-	25	25
2	Ingemar Stenmark	Sweden	115	(29)	-	25	25	-	25	(11)	20	(6)	(12)	20
3	Franz Gruber	Austria	82	(30)	(11)	(11)	(8)	12	15	20	15	-	20	-
4	Petar Popangelov	Bulgaria	77	(17)	20	-	15	-	10	(6)	(5)	20	(6)	12
5	Bojan Križaj	Yugoslavia	66	(23)	-	20	10	9	12	15	(7)	-	(8)	(8)
6	Andreas Wenzel	Liechtenstein	60		25	-	7	15	5	-	8	-	-	-
7	Paolo De Chiesa	Italy	57		-	-	-	20	-	-	12	-	10	15
8	Robert Zoller	Austria	55		-	-	20	-	-	-	-	25	-	10
9	Phil Mahre	United States	44		7	-	-	-	-	12	10	15	-	-
	Lars-Göran Halvarsson	Sweden	44		-	-	-	-	11	-	3	15	15	-
11	Alex Giorgi	Italy	43		-	5	12	-	6	-	-	-	9	11
12	Stig Strand	Sweden	39		-	-	11	7	-	10	11	-	-	-
13	Klaus Heidegger	Austria	36		-	-	-	-	-	-	9	10	11	6
14	Jonas Nilsson	Sweden	33		10	-	-	6	-	9	-	8	-	-
15	Paul Frommelt	Liechtenstein	32		15	-	-	10	-	7	-	-	-	-
16	Max Julen	Switzerland	31		-	-	9	11	-	4	-	-	7	-
17	Didier Bouvet	France	27	(2)	4	-	-	8	4	-	(2)	-	4	7
18	Bengt Fjällberg	Sweden	25		12	-	-	-	-	-	4	-	-	9
19	Roberto Grigis	Italy	23		5	10	-	-	8	-	-	-	-	-
	Anton Steiner	Austria	23		9	9	-	-	-	2	-	-	-	3
21	Joël Gaspoz	Switzerland	22		-	7	2	1	3	-	-	9	-	-
22	Steve Mahre	United States	21		-	15	-	-	-	-	6	-	-	-
	Gunnar Neuriesser	Sweden	21		-	-	-	5	-	-	-	11	-	5
24	Pirmin Zurbriggen	Switzerland	17		-	12	-	-	-	-	-	2	3	-
25	Vladimir Andreev	Soviet Union	16		-	6	-	-	9	1	-	-	-	-
26	Jože Kuralt	Yugoslavia	15		-	8	-	4	-	-	-	-	2	1
27	Florian Beck	West Germany	13		-	-	5	-	7	-	1	-	-	-
28	Christian Orlainsky	Austria	12		8	-	-	-	-	-	-	-	-	4
29	Osamu Kodama	Japan	11		-	-	6	-	-	-	-	-	5	-
30	Michel Vion	France	8		-	-	-	-	-	8	-	-	-	-
31	Tomaž Cerkovnik	Yugoslavia	7		-	-	4	-	-	3	-	-	-	-
	Mark Tache	United States	7		-	-	-	-	-	-	-	7	-	-
	Hubert Strolz	Austria	7		3	-	-	-	-	-	-	4	-	-
34	Ivano Edalini	Italy	6		6	-	-	-	-	-	-	-	-	-
	Yves Tavernier	France	6		-	4	-	-	2	-	-	-	-	-
36	Jure Franko	Yugoslavia	5		2	3	-	-	-	-	-	-	-	-
	Martin Hangl	Switzerland	5		-	-	-	-	-	5	-	-	-	-
	John Buxman	United States	5		-	-	-	-	-	-	-	5	-	-
	Odd Sørli	Norway	5		2	-	-	-	-	-	-	3	-	-
40	Günther Mader	Austria	3		-	-	3	-	-	-	-	-	-	-
	Michel Canac	France	3		-	-	-	3	-	-	-	-	-	-
	Jacques Lüthy	Switzerland	3		-	2	-	-	1	-	-	-	-	-
43	Thomas Bürgler	Switzerland	2		-	-	-	2	-	-	-	-	-	-
	Tiger Shaw	United States	2		-	-	-	-	-	-	-	2	-	-
	Joakim Wallner	Sweden	2		-	-	-	-	-	-	-	-	-	2
46	Egon Hirt	West Germany	1		-	1	-	-	-	-	-	-	-	-
	Toshihiro Kaiwa	Japan	1		-	-	1	-	-	-	-	-	-	-
	Oswald Tötsch	Italy	1		-	-	-	-	-	-	-	-	1	-

Alpine skiing World Cup
Men

Overall | Downhill | Giant/Super G | Slalom | Combined

1984
