= 1984 Alpine Skiing World Cup – Men's downhill =

1984 Men's Downhill World Cup
Previous: 1983	Next: 1985

Men's downhill World Cup 1983/1984

== Calendar ==
Round	Race No	Place	Country	Date	Winner	Second	Third
1	2	Schladming	Austria	December 4, 1983	(Austria) Erwin Resch	(Austria) Harti Weirather	(Canada) Steve Podborski
2	3	Val d'Isère	France	December 9, 1983	(Switzerland) Franz Heinzer	(Canada) Todd Brooker	(Austria) Harti Weirather
3	8	Val Gardena	Italy	December 18, 1983	(Switzerland) Urs Räber	(Canada) Todd Brooker	(Canada) Steve Podborski
4	12	Laax	Switzerland	January 7, 1984	(Switzerland) Urs Räber	(Austria) Franz Klammer	(Italy) Michael Mair
5	14	Wengen	Switzerland	January 15, 1984	(United States) Bill Johnson	(Austria) Anton Steiner	(Austria) Erwin Resch
6	18	Kitzbühel	Austria	January 21, 1984	(Austria) Franz Klammer	(Austria) Erwin Resch	(Austria) Anton Steiner
7	22	Garmisch-Partenkirchen	West Germany	January 28, 1984	(Canada) Steve Podborski	(Austria) Erwin Resch	(Austria) Franz Klammer
8	25	Cortina d'Ampezzo	Italy	February 2, 1984	(Austria) Helmut Höflehner	(Switzerland) Urs Räber	(Switzerland) Conradin Cathomen
9	28	Aspen	United States	March 4, 1984	(United States) Bill Johnson	(Austria) Helmut Höflehner (Austria) Anton Steiner
10	32	Whistler Mountain	Canada	March 11, 1984	(United States) Bill Johnson	(Austria) Helmut Höflehner	(Switzerland) Pirmin Zurbriggen

== Final point standings ==
In men's downhill World Cup 1983/84 the best 5 results count. Deduction are given in brackets.

Place	Name	Country	Total points	Deduction	2 (Austria)	3 (France)	8 (Italy)	12 (Switzerland)	14 (Switzerland)	18 (Austria)	22 (Germany)	25 (Italy)	28 (United States)	32 (Canada)
1	Urs Räber	Switzerland	94	(17)	12	12	25	25	(1)	(10)	-	20	(6)	-
2	Erwin Resch	Austria	91	(20)	25	(10)	-	(10)	15	20	20	-	11	-
3	Bill Johnson	United States	87		-	-	-	-	25	-	-	12	25	25
4	Franz Klammer	Austria	79	(17)	11	(6)	8	20	(3)	25	15	(2)	-	(6)
5	Steve Podborski	Canada	76	(17)	15	(9)	15	-	-	-	25	10	(8)	11
6	Helmut Höflehner	Austria	74		-	-	-	2	-	-	7	25	20	20
7	Anton Steiner	Austria	67	(5)	-	-	-	-	20	15	6	6	20	(5)
8	Franz Heinzer	Switzerland	66	(14)	(4)	25	12	11	-	-	(8)	(2)	9	9
9	Todd Brooker	Canada	64		10	20	20	-	-	-	-	-	2	12
10	Pirmin Zurbriggen	Switzerland	59		-	-	-	-	10	12	10	-	12	15
11	Harti Weirather	Austria	58	(9)	20	15	7	(6)	7	-	-	9	(3)	-
12	Peter Wirnsberger	Austria	45	(2)	6	(2)	-	12	-	11	5	11	-	-
13	Conradin Cathomen	Switzerland	43	(3)	8	8	-	3	-	9	(3)	15	-	-
14	Peter Müller	Switzerland	42	(5)	7	(4)	-	-	-	8	12	5	(1)	10
15	Bruno Kernen	Switzerland	35	(2)	5	3	-	9	-	-	-	8	10	(2)
16	Silvano Meli	Switzerland	34	(3)	(3)	7	-	7	5	4	11	-	-	-
	Michael Mair	Italy	34		-	-	-	15	12	-	-	-	7	-
18	Steven Lee	Australia	29		-	5	-	-	10	3	-	7	4	-
19	Gerhard Pfaffenbichler	Austria	25		-	11	-	5	-	6	-	-	-	3
20	Stefan Niederseer	Austria	23		9	-	-	-	-	1	9	-	-	4
21	Gary Athans	Canada	17		-	-	1	-	11	-	-	-	5	-
	Klaus Gattermann	West Germany	17		-	-	10	-	-	-	-	-	-	7
23	Alberto Ghidoni	Italy	12		-	-	5	-	-	7	-	-	-	-
24	Ivano Marzola	Italy	11		-	-	11	-	-	-	-	-	-	-
25	Sepp Wildgruber	West Germany	10		-	-	-	-	4	5	-	-	-	1
26	Herbert Renoth	West Germany	9		-	-	9	-	-	-	-	-	-	-
27	Peter Lüscher	Switzerland	8		-	-	-	8	-	-	-	-	-	-
	Valeri Tsyganov	Soviet Union	8		-	-	-	-	8	-	-	-	-	-
	Doug Lewis	United States	8		-	-	-	-	-	-	-	-	-	8
30	Paul Boivin	Canada	7		-	-	7	-	-	-	-	-	-	-
	Vladimir Makeev	Soviet Union	7		2	-	-	-	-	-	5	-	-	-
32	Oskar Delago	Italy	6		-	-	-	-	6	-	-	-	-	-
	Bernhard Flaschberger	Austria	6		-	-	-	4	-	-	2	-	-	-
34	Philippe Verneret	France	4		-	-	4	-	-	-	-	-	-	-
	Peter Dürr	West Germany	4		-	-	-	-	-	-	-	4	-	-
	Danilo Sbardellotto	Italy	4		-	-	-	1	-	-	-	3	-	-
37	Christian Solle	Austria	3		-	-	3	-	-	-	-	-	-	-
	Andreas Wenzel	Liechtenstein	3		-	-	-	-	-	2	1	-	-	-
39	Martin Bell	United Kingdom	2		-	-	2	-	-	-	-	-	-	-
	Phil Mahre	United States	2		-	-	-	-	2	-	-	-	-	-
41	Leonhard Stock	Austria	1		1	-	-	-	-	-	-	-	-	-
	Jean-François Rey	France	1		-	1	-	-	-	-	-	-	-	-
	Guido Hinterseer	Austria	1		-	-	-	-	-	1	-	-	-	-

Alpine skiing World Cup
Men

Overall | Downhill | Giant/Super G | Slalom | Combined

1984
