= 1985 Alpine Skiing World Cup – Men's slalom =

1985 Men's Slalom World Cup
Previous: 1984	Next: 1986

Men's slalom World Cup 1984/1985

== Calendar ==
Round	Race No	Place	Country	Date	Winner	Second	Third
1	1	Sestriere	Italy	December 2, 1984	(Luxembourg) Marc Girardelli	(Sweden) Jonas Nilsson	(Italy) Paolo De Chiesa
2	4	Sestriere	Italy	December 10, 1984	(Switzerland) Pirmin Zurbriggen	(Italy) Paolo De Chiesa	(Italy) Ivano Edalini
3	7	Madonna di Campiglio	Italy	December 16, 1984	(Socialist Federal Republic of Yugoslavia) Bojan Križaj	(Liechtenstein) Andreas Wenzel	(Bulgaria) Petar Popangelov
4	10	Bad Wiessee	West Germany	January 4, 1985	(Luxembourg) Marc Girardelli	(West Germany) Florian Beck	(Sweden) Ingemar Stenmark
5	11	La Mongie	France	January 6, 1985	(Liechtenstein) Andreas Wenzel	(Sweden) Jonas Nilsson	(Liechtenstein) Paul Frommelt
6	16	Kitzbühel	Austria	January 13, 1985	(Luxembourg) Marc Girardelli	(Italy) Oswald Tötsch	(Socialist Federal Republic of Yugoslavia) Bojan Križaj
7	21	Wengen	Switzerland	January 21, 1985	(Luxembourg) Marc Girardelli	(Sweden) Ingemar Stenmark	(Liechtenstein) Paul Frommelt
8	28	Kranjska Gora	Yugoslavia	February 16, 1985	(Luxembourg) Marc Girardelli	(Sweden) Ingemar Stenmark	(Liechtenstein) Paul Frommelt (Sweden) Jonas Nilsson
9	35	Park City	United States	March 20, 1985	(Luxembourg) Marc Girardelli	(Socialist Federal Republic of Yugoslavia) Rok Petrović	(Liechtenstein) Paul Frommelt
10	36	Heavenly Valley	United States	March 23, 1985	(Luxembourg) Marc Girardelli	(Liechtenstein) Paul Frommelt	(Austria) Robert Zoller

== Final point standings ==
In men's slalom World Cup 1984/85 the best 5 results count.

Place	Name	Country	Total points	Deduction	1 (Italy)	4 (Italy)	7 (Italy)	10 (Germany)	11 (France)	16 (Austria)	21 (Switzerland)	28 (Socialist Federal Republic of Yugoslavia)	35 (United States)	36 (United States)
1	Marc Girardelli	Luxembourg	125	(50)	25	-	-	25	-	25	25	25	(25)	(25)
2	Paul Frommelt	Liechtenstein	80		-	-	-	-	15	-	15	15	15	20
3	Ingemar Stenmark	Sweden	78	(8)	-	-	12	15	11	(8)	20	20	-	-
4	Andreas Wenzel	Liechtenstein	75		-	11	20	9	25	10	-	-	-	-
5	Paolo De Chiesa	Italy	70		15	20	-	12	12	11	-	-	-	-
6	Bojan Križaj	Yugoslavia	69		-	7	25	11	-	15	11	-	-	-
7	Jonas Nilsson	Sweden	67		20	-	10	-	20	2	-	15	-	-
8	Oswald Tötsch	Italy	57		-	12	5	10	-	20	-	-	-	10
9	Ivano Edalini	Italy	53	(4)	9	15	(4)	-	-	6	-	11	12	-
10	Klaus Heidegger	Austria	51	(3)	12	-	9	-	-	(3)	8	10	-	12
11	Petar Popangelov	Bulgaria	46	(2)	-	6	15	-	-	-	6	(2)	10	9
12	Robert Zoller	Austria	44		-	9	8	-	-	-	12	-	-	15
	Alex Giorgi	Italy	44	(1)	-	-	-	(1)	9	12	10	-	5	8
14	Pirmin Zurbriggen	Switzerland	38		2	25	-	-	-	-	-	-	-	11
15	Florian Beck	West Germany	37		8	-	-	20	-	4	-	-	-	5
16	Rok Petrović	Yugoslavia	30		-	5	-	-	-	-	5	-	20	-
	Didier Bouvet	France	30		-	4	-	-	-	-	7	8	11	-
18	Max Julen	Switzerland	26		-	10	6	-	10	-	-	-	-	-
	Thomas Stangassinger	Austria	26		-	-	11	6	-	-	-	9	-	-
20	Michel Vion	France	20		-	-	-	8	5	1	-	6	-	-
	Frank Wörndl	West Germany	20		-	-	7	5	-	-	1	-	7	-
22	Robert Erlacher	Italy	18		10	8	-	-	-	-	-	-	-	-
23	Thomas Bürgler	Switzerland	16		-	-	-	-	7	-	9	-	-	-
24	Lars-Göran Halvarsson	Sweden	15		-	-	-	-	8	7	-	-	-	-
	Chiaki Ishioka	Japan	15		-	1	-	3	-	5	-	-	-	6
26	Daniel Mougel	France	14		7	-	-	-	-	-	-	-	-	7
27	Roberto Grigis	Italy	13		6	-	-	-	-	-	-	7	-	-
28	Martin Hangl	Switzerland	11		11	-	-	-	-	-	-	-	-	-
	Franz Gruber	Austria	11		-	2	-	-	-	9	-	-	-	-
30	Daniel Fontaine	France	9		4	-	-	5	-	-	-	-	-	-
	Naomine Iwaya	Japan	9		-	-	-	-	6	-	3	-	-	-
	Tiger Shaw	United States	9		-	-	-	-	-	-	-	-	9	-
33	Richard Pramotton	Italy	8		5	-	-	3	-	-	-	-	-	-
	Dan Stripp	United States	8		-	-	-	-	-	-	-	-	8	-
35	Joël Gaspoz	Switzerland	7		-	-	-	7	-	-	-	-	-	-
	Ernst Riedlsperger	Austria	7		-	-	3	-	-	-	-	4	-	-
37	Jože Kuralt	Yugoslavia	6		-	-	2	-	-	-	4	-	-	-
	John Buxman	United States	6		-	-	-	-	-	-	-	-	6	-
	Bengt Fjällberg	Sweden	6		2	-	-	-	-	-	-	-	-	4
	Stefan Pistor	West Germany	6		-	-	-	-	4	-	-	-	-	2
41	Mathias Berthold	Austria	5		-	-	-	-	-	-	-	5	-	-
42	Anton Steiner	Austria	4		-	-	-	-	-	-	-	-	4	-
	Gunnar Neuriesser	Sweden	4		-	-	-	-	2	-	2	-	-	-
	Peter Namberger	West Germany	4		-	-	-	-	3	-	-	-	-	1
45	Carlo Gerosa	Italy	3		3	-	-	-	-	-	-	-	-	-
	Tomaž Cerkovnik	Yugoslavia	3		-	3	-	-	-	-	-	-	-	-
	Marco Tonazzi	Italy	3		-	-	-	-	-	-	-	3	-	-
	Felix McGrath	United States	3		-	-	-	-	-	-	-	-	3	-
	Bob Ormsby	United States	3		-	-	-	-	-	-	-	-	-	3
50	Dietmar Köhlbichler	Austria	2		-	-	1	-	-	-	-	1	-	-
	Sandy Williams	United States	2		-	-	-	-	-	-	-	-	2	-
52	Tetsuya Okabe	Japan	1		-	-	-	-	1	-	-	-	-	-
	Cory Carlson	United States	1		-	-	-	-	-	-	-	-	1	-

Alpine skiing World Cup
Men

Overall | Downhill | Giant/Super G | Slalom | Combined

1985
