= 1985 Alpine Skiing World Cup – Men's downhill =

1985 Men's Downhill World Cup
Previous: 1984	Next: 1986

Men's downhill World Cup 1984/1985

== Calendar ==
Round	Race No	Place	Country	Date	Winner	Second	Third
1	6	Val Gardena	Italy	December 15, 1984	(Austria) Helmut Höflehner	(Switzerland) Conradin Cathomen	(Austria) Peter Wirnsberger
2	13	Kitzbühel	Austria	January 11, 1985	(Switzerland) Pirmin Zurbriggen	(Switzerland) Franz Heinzer	(Austria) Peter Wirnsberger
3	15	Kitzbühel	Austria	January 12, 1985	(Switzerland) Pirmin Zurbriggen	(Austria) Helmut Höflehner	(Canada) Todd Brooker
4	19	Wengen	Switzerland	January 19, 1985	(Austria) Helmut Höflehner	(Switzerland) Franz Heinzer	(Austria) Peter Wirnsberger
5	20	Wengen	Switzerland	January 20, 1985	(Austria) Peter Wirnsberger	(Switzerland) Peter Lüscher	(Switzerland) Peter Müller
6	23	Garmisch-Partenkirchen	West Germany	January 26, 1985	(Austria) Helmut Höflehner	(Switzerland) Peter Müller	(Austria) Anton Steiner
7	26	Bad Kleinkirchheim	Austria	February 14, 1985	(Switzerland) Karl Alpiger	(Switzerland) Peter Müller	(Austria) Stefan Niederseer
8	29	Furano	Japan	March 2, 1985	(Canada) Todd Brooker	(West Germany) Sepp Wildgruber	(Switzerland) Bruno Kernen
9	31	Aspen	United States	March 9, 1985	(Switzerland) Peter Müller	(Switzerland) Karl Alpiger	(West Germany) Sepp Wildgruber
10	33	Panorama	Canada	March 16, 1985	(Switzerland) Peter Müller	(Switzerland) Daniel Mahrer	(Austria) Helmut Höflehner

== Final point standings ==
In men's downhill World Cup 1984/85 the best 5 results count. Deductions are given in ().

Place	Name	Country	Total points	Deduction	6 (Italy)	13 (Austria)	15 (Austria)	19 (Switzerland)	20 (Switzerland)	23 (Germany)	26 (Austria)	29 (Japan)	31 (United States)	33 (Canada)
1	Helmut Höflehner	Austria	110	(42)	25	(12)	20	25	(12)	25	(3)	(3)	(12)	15
2	Peter Müller	Switzerland	105	(34)	(4)	(11)	(11)	(8)	15	20	20	-	25	25
3	Peter Wirnsberger	Austria	80	(17)	15	15	10	15	25	(5)	-	(6)	(6)	-
	Karl Alpiger	Switzerland	80	(17)	11	(1)	(2)	(1)	(8)	12	25	12	20	(5)
5	Pirmin Zurbriggen	Switzerland	79		9	25	25	-	-	-	8	-	-	12
6	Franz Heinzer	Switzerland	73	(19)	(6)	20	12	20	(3)	(6)	10	-	11	(4)
7	Todd Brooker	Canada	60	(2)	-	-	15	(2)	7	8	-	25	5	-
8	Daniel Mahrer	Switzerland	59	(6)	-	(4)	8	-	10	-	11	10	(2)	20
9	Anton Steiner	Austria	57	(8)	10	-	-	12	(5)	15	12	-	(3)	8
10	Sepp Wildgruber	West Germany	53		2	-	-	5	11	-	-	20	15	-
11	Bruno Kernen	Switzerland	51	(5)	-	-	7	(3)	(2)	9	9	15	11	-
12	Conradin Cathomen	Switzerland	50	(1)	20	10	9	7	-	4	(1)	-	-	-
13	Michael Mair	Italy	46	(21)	-	7	(6)	10	(4)	11	7	11	(4)	(7)
14	Peter Lüscher	Switzerland	41		-	-	-	11	20	10	-	-	-	-
15	Stefan Niederseer	Austria	31		-	10	-	-	-	-	15	-	-	6
16	Franz Klammer	Austria	23		-	-	5	9	-	3	6	-	-	-
17	Mauro Cornaz	Italy	21		-	8	-	-	1	-	4	8	-	-
	Harti Weirather	Austria	21		-	6	4	-	-	-	-	-	-	11
19	Rudolf Huber	Austria	17		8	-	-	-	-	-	-	-	9	-
	Marc Girardelli	Luxembourg	17		-	-	-	-	-	-	-	-	7	10
	Markus Wasmeier	West Germany	17		-	-	-	-	-	1	-	7	-	9
22	Steven Lee	Australia	16		-	-	3	4	-	-	-	9	-	-
	Silvano Meli	Switzerland	16		3	-	-	-	-	-	-	5	8	-
24	Bill Johnson	United States	15		-	-	-	6	9	-	-	-	-	-
25	Doug Lewis	United States	14		7	6	-	-	-	-	-	-	1	-
26	Klaus Gattermann	West Germany	12		12	-	-	-	-	-	-	-	-	-
27	Danilo Sbardellotto	Italy	10		2	-	-	-	6	-	-	-	-	2
28	Franck Piccard	France	8		-	-	-	-	-	8	-	-	-	-
	Giacomo Erlacher	Italy	8		-	3	-	-	-	-	5	-	-	-
30	Vladimir Makeev	Soviet Union	7		5	-	-	-	-	2	-	-	-	-
	Alberto Ghidoni	Italy	7		-	-	-	-	-	-	2	4	-	1
32	Philippe Verneret	France	3		-	2	-	-	-	-	-	1	-	-
	Chris Kent	Canada	3		-	-	-	-	-	-	-	-	-	3
34	Donald Stevens	Canada	2		-	-	-	-	-	-	-	2	-	-
35	Andreas Wenzel	Liechtenstein	1		-	-	1	-	-	-	-	-	-	-
	Ivano Marzola	Italy	1		-	-	-	-	-	-	-	1	-	-

Alpine skiing World Cup
Men

Overall | Downhill | Giant/Super G | Slalom | Combined

1985
