= 1985 Alpine Skiing World Cup – Men's combined =

1985 Combined World Cup
Previous: 1984	Next: 1986

Men's combined World Cup 1984/1985

== Final point standings ==
In men's combined World Cup 1984/85 all 5 results count.

Place	Name	Country	Total points	9 (Italy)	14 (France) (Austria)	17 (Austria)	22 (Switzerland)	25 (Germany)
1	Andreas Wenzel	Liechtenstein	76	25	15	25	-	11
2	Franz Heinzer	Switzerland	55	-	20	20	-	15
3	Peter Müller	Switzerland	52	-	11	11	5	25
4	Peter Lüscher	Switzerland	39	-	4	-	15	20
5	Markus Wasmeier	West Germany	32	-	12	-	11	9
6	Peter Wirnsberger	Austria	31	-	10	12	9	-
7	Gérard Rambaud	France	27	-	-	15	12	-
8	Peter Roth	West Germany	26	-	-	-	20	6
9	Pirmin Zurbriggen	Switzerland	25	-	25	-	-	-
	Thomas Bürgler	Switzerland	25	12	9	-	-	4
	Michel Vion	France	25	-	-	-	25	-
12	Thomas Stangassinger	Austria	20	20	-	-	-	-
13	Bruno Kernen	Switzerland	19	-	1	10	8	-
14	Daniel Mahrer	Switzerland	17	-	5	8	4	-
15	Max Julen	Switzerland	15	15	-	-	-	-
16	Hans Enn	Austria	13	6	7	-	-	-
	Martin Hangl	Switzerland	13	3	-	-	10	-
18	Franck Piccard	France	12	-	-	-	-	12
19	Petar Popangelov	Bulgaria	11	11	-	-	-	-
20	Bojan Križaj	Yugoslavia	10	10	-	-	-	-
	Karl Alpiger	Switzerland	10	-	-	-	-	10
	Leonhard Stock	Austria	10	-	3	-	-	7
23	Richard Pramotton	Italy	9	9	-	-	-	-
	Shinya Chiba	Japan	9	-	-	9	-	-
25	Ingemar Stenmark	Sweden	8	8	-	-	-	-
	Oswald Tötsch	Italy	8	8	-	-	-	-
	Michael Mair	Italy	8	-	8	-	-	-
	Alexei Bogdanov	Soviet Union	8	-	-	7	1	-
	Joachim Buchner	Austria	8	-	-	-	-	8
30	Lasse Arnesen	Norway	7	-	-	-	7	-
	Ernst Riedlsperger	Austria	7	5	-	-	-	2
32	Helmut Höflehner	Austria	6	-	6	-	-	-
	Atle Skårdal	Norway	6	-	-	-	6	-
34	Mauro Cornaz	Italy	5	-	-	-	-	5
35	Jože Kuralt	Yugoslavia	4	4	-	-	-	-
36	Miroslav Kolář	Czechoslovakia	3	-	-	-	3	-
	Peter Dürr	West Germany	3	-	-	-	-	3
38	Jonas Nilsson	Sweden	2	2	-	-	-	-
	Stefan Niederseer	Austria	2	-	2	-	-	-
	Pavel Pochobradský	Czechoslovakia	2	-	-	-	2	-
41	Rudolf Nierlich	Austria	1	1	-	-	-	-
	Philippe Verneret	France	1	-	-	-	-	1

Note:

Race 3 not all points were awarded (not enough finishers).

Alpine skiing World Cup
Men

Overall | Downhill | Giant/Super G | Slalom | Combined

1985
