= 1989 Alpine Skiing World Cup – Men's super-G =

1989 Men's super-G World Cup
Previous: 1988	Next: 1990

Men's super-G World Cup 1988/1989

== Calendar ==
Round	Race No	Place	Country	Date	Winner	Second	Third
1	1	Schladming	Austria	November 27, 1988	(Switzerland) Pirmin Zurbriggen	(France) Franck Piccard	(Austria) Leonhard Stock
2	12	Laax	Switzerland	January 8, 1989	(Switzerland) Martin Hangl	(Austria) Hans Enn	(Austria) Helmut Mayer
3	24	Aspen	United States	February 18, 1989	(Sweden) Lars-Börje Eriksson	(West Germany) Markus Wasmeier	(Austria) Helmut Mayer
4	27	Whistler Mountain	Canada	February 26, 1989	(Luxembourg) Marc Girardelli	(Sweden) Lars-Börje Eriksson	(Switzerland) Pirmin Zurbriggen

== Final point standings ==
In men's super-G World Cup 1988/89 all four results count.

Place	Name	Country	Total points	1 (Austria)	12 (Switzerland)	24 (United States)	27 (Canada)
1	Pirmin Zurbriggen	Switzerland	62	25	12	10	15
2	Lars-Börje Eriksson	Sweden	51	-	6	25	20
3	Franck Piccard	France	49	20	9	11	9
4	Martin Hangl	Switzerland	47	3	25	9	10
5	Marc Girardelli	Luxembourg	46	7	2	12	25
6	Markus Wasmeier	West Germany	43	11	-	20	12
7	Alberto Tomba	Italy	37	12	11	7	7
8	Helmut Mayer	Austria	35	-	15	15	5
9	Hans Enn	Austria	26	6	20	-	-
10	Luc Alphand	France	25	9	-	5	11
11	Günther Mader	Austria	20	5	10	4	1
12	Leonhard Stock	Austria	19	15	4	-	-
13	Hubert Strolz	Austria	18	10	8	-	-
14	Helmut Höflehner	Austria	14	8	-	6	-
15	Peter Runggaldier	Italy	13	-	5	-	8
16	Michael Eder	West Germany	8	1	7	-	-
	Tomaž Čižman	Yugoslavia	8	-	-	8	-
18	Peter Müller	Switzerland	6	-	3	3	-
	Urs Kälin	Switzerland	6	-	-	-	6
20	Franz Heinzer	Switzerland	5	-	-	1	4
21	Herbert Renoth	West Germany	4	4	-	-	-
22	Niklas Henning	Sweden	3	-	-	-	3
	Peter Eigler	West Germany	3	-	-	-	3
24	Josef Polig	Italy	2	2	-	-	-
	Daniel Mahrer	Switzerland	2	-	-	2	-
26	Heinz Holzer	Italy	1	-	1	-	-
	Felix Belczyk	Canada	1	-	-	1	-

== Men's Super-G Team Results ==
bold indicate highest score - italics indicate race wins

Place	Country	Total points	1 (Austria)	12 (Switzerland)	24 (United States)	27 (Canada)	Racers	Wins
1	Austria	132	44	**57**	25	6	6	0
2	Switzerland	128	28	40	24	35	6	2
3	France	74	29	9	16	20	2	0
4	West Germany	58	16	7	20	15	4	0
5	Sweden	54	-	6	25	23	2	1
6	Italy	53	14	17	7	15	4	0
7	Luxembourg	46	7	2	12	25	1	1
8	Yugoslavia	8	-	-	8	-	1	0
9	Canada	1	-	-	1	-	1	0

**Alpine skiing World Cup**
**Men**

Overall | Downhill | Super-G | Giant slalom | Slalom | Combined

**1989**
