= FIS Alpine World Ski Championships 1985 =

Skiing event in Bormio, Italy

Coordinates: 46.467°N 10.367°E

- Host city: Bormio
- Country: Italy
- Events: 10
- Opening: 31 January 1985
- Closing: 10 February 1985
- Opened by: Sandro Pertini

Location in the Alps of Europe

The FIS Alpine World Ski Championships 1985 were held in Bormio, northern Italy between January 31 and February 10, 1985.

These were the first world championships held in an odd-numbered year, and the last without the Super-G event.

The World Championships returned to Bormio two decades later in 2005.

== Men's Competitions ==
=== Downhill ===
Sunday, February 3

Place	Nation	Athlete	Time
1	(Switzerland)	Pirmin Zurbriggen	2:06.68
2	(Switzerland)	Peter Müller	2:06.79
3	(United States)	Doug Lewis	2:06.82
4	(Switzerland)	Franz Heinzer	2:07.45
5	(Austria)	Franz Klammer	2:07.64
6	(Austria)	Peter Wirnsberger	2:07.70
7	(Austria)	Helmut Höflehner	2:08.01
8	(Switzerland)	Conradin Cathomen	2:08.03
9	(Canada)	Todd Brooker	2:08.05
10	(Australia)	Steven Lee	2:08.29
11	(France)	Philippe Verneret	2:08.54
12	(Italy)	Michael Mair	2:08.56
13	(Italy)	Raimund Ostendorf	2:08.73
14	(United States)	Bill Johnson	2:09.01
15	(France)	Franck Piccard	2:09.19
18	(United States)	Michael Brown	2:09.65
29	(United States)	Alan Lauba	2:12.14

=== Giant slalom ===
Thursday, February 7

Place	Nation	Athlete	Time	Run 1	Run 2
1	(West Germany)	Markus Wasmeier	2:28.90	1:08.78	1:20.12
2	(Switzerland)	Pirmin Zurbriggen	2:28.95	1:09.17	1:19.78
3	(Luxembourg)	Marc Girardelli	2:29.22	1:09.41	1:19.81
4	(West Germany)	Egon Hirt	2:30.35
5	(Austria)	Hans Enn	2:30.36
6	(Italy)	Robert Erlacher	2:30.53
7	(Socialist Federal Republic of Yugoslavia)	Rok Petrovič	2:31.03
8	(Socialist Federal Republic of Yugoslavia)	Bojan Križaj	2:31.26
9	(Italy)	Oswald Tötsch	2:31.40
10	(Switzerland)	Max Julen	2:31.71
11	(Socialist Federal Republic of Yugoslavia)	Jure Franko	2:31.78
12	(France)	Christian Gaidet	2:31.84
13	(Italy)	Richard Pramotton	2:31.91
14	(Switzerland)	Martin Hangl	2:32.11
15	(Switzerland)	Thomas Bürgler	2:32.70
18	(United States)	Tiger Shaw	2:35.08

=== Slalom ===
Sunday, February 10

Place	Nation	Athlete	Time	Run 1	Run 2
1	(Sweden)	Jonas Nilsson	1:38.82	49.33	49.49
2	(Luxembourg)	Marc Girardelli	1:38.88	49.01	49.87
3	(Austria)	Robert Zoller	1:39.35	49.67	49.68
4	(Sweden)	Ingemar Stenmark	1:39.74
5	(Socialist Federal Republic of Yugoslavia)	Bojan Križaj	1:40.07
6	(Italy)	Paolo De Chiesa	1:40.27
7	(France)	Daniel Mougel	1:40.63
8	(West Germany)	Florian Beck	1:41.63
9	(Italy)	Ivano Edalini	1:42.33
10	(Italy)	Alex Giorgi	1:42.84
11	(Switzerland)	Martin Hangl	1:43.19
12	(Norway)	Torjus Berge	1:43.40
13	(Sweden)	Gunnar Neuriesser	1:43.72
14	(Japan)	Hiroaki Ohtaka	1:45.39
15	(Norway)	Finn Christian Jagge	1:47.03

=== Combined ===
Tuesday, February 5 (slalom, 2 runs)
Friday, February 1 (downhill)

Place	Nation	Athlete	Points
1	(Switzerland)	Pirmin Zurbriggen	7.67
2	(Austria)	Ernst Riedlsperger	37.84
3	(Switzerland)	Thomas Bürgler	39.41
4	(Liechtenstein)	Andreas Wenzel	48.41
5	(France)	Michel Vion	50.38
6	(France)	Franck Piccard	55.14
7	(West Germany)	Markus Wasmeier	56.04
8	(Austria)	Günther Mader	61.56

== Women's competitions ==
=== Downhill ===
Sunday, February 3 (delayed one day; high winds)

Placing	Country	Athlete	Time
1	(Switzerland)	Michela Figini	1:26.96
2	(Switzerland)	Ariane Ehrat	1:28.57
	(Austria)	Katharina Gutensohn	1:28.57
4	(Austria)	Sigrid Wolf	1:28.58
5	(West Germany)	Regine Mösenlechner	1:28.64
6	(Switzerland)	Maria Walliser	1:28.76
7	(Canada)	Laurie Graham	1:29.10
8	(Switzerland)	Brigitte Oertli	1:29.16
9	(West Germany)	Traudl Hächer	1:29.23
10	(Austria)	Sylvia Eder	1:29.30
11	(West Germany)	Marina Kiehl	1:29.32
12	(Austria)	Elisabeth Kirchler	1:29.37
13	(Canada)	Karen Percy	1:29.42
14	(France)	Marie-Cécile Gros-Gaudenier	1:29.50
15	(Canada)	Karen Stemmle	1:29.64
20	(United States)	Holly Flanders	1:30.58
23	(United States)	Debbie Armstrong	1:30.87
25	(United States)	Cindy Nelson	1:31.95
27	(United States)	Cindy Oak	1:32.31

=== Giant slalom ===
Wednesday, February 6

Placing	Country	Athlete	Time	Run 1	Run 2
1	(United States)	Diann Roffe	2:18.53	1:09.18	1:09.35
2	(Austria)	Elisabeth Kirchler	2:19.13	1:09.01	1:10.12
3	(United States)	Eva Twardokens	2:19.21	1:08.91	1:10.30
4	(United States)	Debbie Armstrong	2:19.26
5	(West Germany)	Marina Kiehl	2:19.60
6	(West Germany)	Traudl Hächer	2:20.14
7	(West Germany)	Maria Epple	2:20.34
8	(Switzerland)	Maria Walliser	2:20.51
9	(Spain)	Blanca Fernández Ochoa	2:20.59
10	(Canada)	Liisa Savijarvi	2:20.67
11	(Switzerland)	Erika Hess	2:20.79
12	(Switzerland)	Vreni Schneider	2:20.82
13	(Socialist Federal Republic of Yugoslavia)	Mateja Svet	2:20.97
14	(West Germany)	Michaela Gerg	2:21.06
15	(Switzerland)	Michela Figini	2:21.59

=== Slalom ===
Saturday, February 9

Placing	Country	Athlete	Time	Run 1	Run 2
1	(France)	Perrine Pelen	1:29.58 (45.48 + 44.10)	45.48	44.10
2	(France)	Christelle Guignard	1:29.93 (46.10 + 43.83)	46.10	43.83
3	(Italy)	Paoletta Magoni	1:29.98 (46.04 + 43.94)	46.04	43.94
4	(Austria)	Anni Kronbichler	1:30.18
5	(Switzerland)	Brigitte Oertli	1:30.21
6	(Poland)	Dorota Tlałka	1:30.43
7	(Poland)	Małgorzata Tlałka	1:30.54
8	(Switzerland)	Corinne Schmidhauser	1:30.72
9	(Switzerland)	Brigitte Gadient	1:30.79
10	(United States)	Eva Twardokens	1:31.35

=== Combined ===
Monday, February 4 (slalom, 2 runs)
Thursday, January 31 (downhill)

Placing	Country	Athlete	Points
1	(Switzerland)	Erika Hess	18.72
2	(Austria)	Sylvia Eder	34.42
3	(United States)	Tamara McKinney	44.45

== Medals table ==
Place	Nation	Gold	Silver	Bronze	Total
1	Switzerland	4	3	1	8
2	France	1	1	-	2
3	United States	1	-	3	4
4	West Germany	1	-	-	1
	Sweden	1	-	-	1
6	Austria	-	4	1	5
7	Luxembourg	-	1	1	2
8	Italy	-	-	1	1
