= Hangl =

Hangl is a surname. Notable people with the surname include:

- Marco Hangl (born 1967), Swiss alpine skier
- Martin Hangl (born 1962), Swiss alpine skier
