= Gary Athans =

Canadian alpine skier (born 1961)

Gary Athans (born 12 June 1961 in Kelowna, British Columbia) is a Canadian former alpine skier who competed in the 1984 Winter Olympics.

Athans was a water-ski champion, and then spent eight years on the Canada national team and later represented his nation at the 1984 Winter Olympics, where he finished 26th. In 2009, Athans along with his family, were inducted into the Central Okanagan Sports Hall of Fame. His father George Athans, was captain of the Canadian Olympic team in 1948 and was a gold medal diver at the 1950 British Empire Games. His mother Irene was a Manitoba champion in swimming and synchronized swimming and a Canadian record holder in masters swimming. His brothers George Junior (water skiing) and Greg (ballet skiing) were also world champions. In 2010 he helped carry the Olympic torch as it made its way to Vancouver for the 2010 Winter Games. After retiring, he now works in real estate. He has 4 children.
