= Christelle Guignard =

French alpine skier (born 1962)

Medal record

Women's alpine skiing

Representing France

World Championships
Silver medal – second place	1985 Bormio	Slalom

Christelle Guignard (born 27 September 1962 in Les Deux Alpes) is a retired French alpine skier. She competed at the 1984, 1988 and the 1992 Winter Olympics.

== Doping ban ==
Guignard came third in the giant slalom at the FIS Alpine World Ski Championships 1989 in Vail, but since her doping sample was found positive for nikethamide, she lost the bronze medal. She was also banned from sport for 1 year.

== World Cup victories ==
Date	Location	Race
9 December 1984	(Switzerland) Davos	Slalom
12 January 1985	(Austria) Bad Kleinkirchheim	Slalom
