= Todd Brooker =

Canadian alpine skier (born 1959)

Personal information
- Born: 24 November 1959 (age 66) Paris, Ontario, Canada

Skiing career
- Sport: Alpine skiing
- Club: Toronto Ski Club
- Retired: January 1987 (age 27)
- Disciplines: Downhill
- World Cup debut: 13 December 1981 (age 22)

Olympics
- Teams: 1 – (1984)
- Medals: 0

World Championships
- Teams: 2 – (1982, 1985)
- Medals: 0

World Cup
- Seasons: 6 – (1982–1987)
- Wins: 3 – (3 DH)
- Podiums: 7 – (7 DH)
- Overall titles: 0 – (25th in 1984)
- Discipline titles: 0 – (7th in DH, 1985)
Medal record
Men's alpine skiing
Representing Canada
World Cup race podiums
Event	1st	2nd	3rd
Downhill	3	3	1

Todd Brooker (born 24 November 1959) is a former alpine ski racer member Crazy Canucks and a ski commentator on television.

== World Cup career ==
Todd Brooker was born on 24 November 1949 in Paris, Ontario. He learned to ski and race at The Toronto Ski Club at Blue Mountain, near Collingwood and made the Canadian national team in 1977; he competed on the World Cup circuit from December 1981 to January 1987. A younger member of the Crazy Canucks (Canada's downhill team) of the early 1980s, Brooker won two World Cup downhill races at (Kitzbühel & Aspen) in 1983 finishing ninth in the season's overall downhill standings. Two years later, he won the downhill race in Furano, Japan finishing seventh in the 1985 downhill standings.

Brookers rise to world class prominence placed him 13th at the 1982 World Championships, ninth in the downhill in both the 1984 Winter Olympics and the 1985 World Championships.

The Hahnenkamm in Kitzbühel, Austria, is widely regarded as one of the most challenging races on the downhill skiing World Cup circuit. The Streif course is known for its difficulty and demands both physical skill and mental focus from racers. Winning at Kitzbühel is considered a significant achievement in a skier’s career. Between 1980 and 1983, Canadians Ken Read, Steve Podborski, and Brooker helped break the European streak of victories at this event.

After returning from a knee injury, Brooker's ski racing career ended with a crash in Kitzbühel at the top of the Zielschuss in January 1987. When asked about the video, Brooker has remarked that everyone remembers his Kitzbühel fall, except for him. The crash in the Friday training run ended his season and racing career.

Brooker finished his World Cup career with three victories, seven podiums, and 15 top ten finishes, all in downhill.

== World Cup results ==
=== Season standings ===
Season	Age	Overall	Slalom	Giant Slalom	Super-G	Downhill	Combined
1982	22	32	—	—	not run	14	—
1983	23	27	—	—	not awarded	9	—
1984	24	25	—	—	not awarded	9	—
1985	25	29	—	—	not awarded	7	—
1986	26	83	—	—	—	33	—
1987	27	71	—	—	—	26	—

=== Race podiums ===
- 3 wins – (3 DH)
- 7 podiums – (7 DH)

Season	Date	Location	Discipline	Place
1982	6 March 1982	(United States) Aspen, CO, USA	Downhill	2nd
1983	22 January 1983	Kitzbühel, Austria	Downhill	1st
1983	6 March 1983	(United States) Aspen, CO, USA	Downhill	1st
1984	9 December 1983	Val d'Isère, France	Downhill	2nd
1984	18 December 1983	Val Gardena, Italy	Downhill	2nd
1985	12 January 1985	Kitzbühel, Austria	Downhill	3rd
1985	2 March 1985	Furano, Japan	Downhill	1st

== World championship results ==
Year	Age	Slalom	Giant Slalom	Super-G	Downhill	Combined
1982	22	—	—	not run	13	—
1985	25	—	—	not run	9	—

== Olympic results ==
Year	Age	Slalom	Giant Slalom	Super-G	Downhill	Combined
1984	24	—	—	not run	9	not run

== Post-racing career ==
Brooker has been a ski commentator on television for a number of years, and has worked for most of the major networks in North America. He has covered alpine skiing for numerous Winter Olympics for U.S. television, and currently provides commentary and analysis on CBC in Canada during the World Cup ski season. Brooker covered alpine skiing at the 2010 Winter Olympics for NBC in the United States.

Brooker lives on a farm in rural Ontario near Thornbury, with his wife and three daughters.

== Crabbe Mountain Speed Camp ==
Brooker also made an appearance at the 2011 Crabbe Mountain Speed Camp, a camp where kids from across Atlantic Canada go to learn the discipline known as Super G.

== See also ==
- Crazy Canucks
