= Bill Johnson (skier) =

American alpine skier (1960–2016)

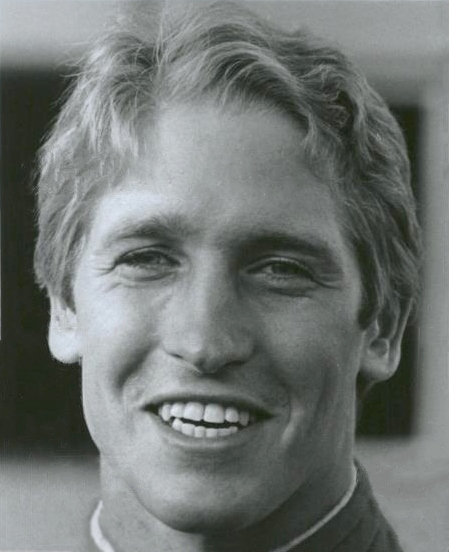
- Johnson in 1984

Personal information
- Born: March 30, 1960 Los Angeles, California, U.S.
- Died: January 21, 2016 (aged 55) Gresham, Oregon, U.S.
- Height: 5 ft 9 in (175 cm)

Skiing career
- Sport: Alpine skiing
- Retired: March 1990 (age 30)
- Disciplines: Downhill, Super G, Combined
- World Cup debut: February 5, 1983 (age 22)

Olympics
- Teams: 1 – (1984)
- Medals: 1 (1 gold)

World Championships
- Teams: 1 – (1985)
- Medals: 0

World Cup
- Seasons: 8 – (1983–1990)
- Wins: 3 – (3 DH)
- Podiums: 3 – (3 DH)
- Overall titles: 0 – (14th in 1984)
- Discipline titles: 0 – (3rd in DH, 1984)
Medal record
Men's alpine skiing
Representing the United States
Olympic Games
Gold medal – first place	1984 Sarajevo	Downhill

William Dean Johnson (March 30, 1960 – January 21, 2016) was an American World Cup alpine ski racer. By winning the downhill at the 1984 Winter Olympics in Sarajevo, Yugoslavia, Johnson became the first American male to win an Olympic gold medal in alpine skiing and the first racer not from an Alpine country to win an Olympic downhill race.

== Olympic triumph ==
Bill Johnson was born in Los Angeles, California, on March 30, 1960, and moved with his family to Boise, Idaho, when he was seven. He learned to ski at Bogus Basin in the late 1960s. Two years later, they moved to Brightwood, Oregon, near Mount Hood, and Johnson later attended Sandy Union High School in Sandy. He was a troubled youth who began competitive skiing on nearby Mount Hood as a means of harnessing his energy. After a run-in with the law at age 17, the juvenile defendant was given the choice between six months in jail or attending the Mission Ridge ski academy in central Washington state, and he chose the latter. His talent in the downhill event eventually landed him a spot on the U.S. Ski Team. Johnson made his World Cup debut in February 1983 and finished sixth in the downhill at St. Anton, Austria.

In 1984 at age 23, Johnson challenged the long-established European domination of downhill ski racing. Even some of his teammates considered the 23-year-old Johnson a brash upstart, as he reveled in his image as the bad boy of skiing. He was nicknamed "Billy the Kid".

"Basically, any downhill skier is a daredevil, and I'm no exception," he said before the Winter Games in the former Yugoslavia. "I like to drive cars faster than 100 [miles per hour]. I like to go over bumps in my car and get airborne. I like to drink. I chase girls full time, but I only drink part time."

After mostly undistinguished finishes, his unexpected victory on January 15, on the storied Lauberhorn course at Wengen, Switzerland, was the first for an American male in World Cup downhill competition.

A month later at the 1984 Winter Olympics in Sarajevo, Yugoslavia (now Bosnia), he had promising downhill training runs on a course that favored his gliding style. He boldly predicted his Olympic victory, evoking comparisons to Joe Namath and Muhammad Ali, and irking his European competitors. His gold medal win at Bjelašnica in a time of 1:45.59 edged out silver medalist Peter Müller of Switzerland by 0.27 seconds. True to form, when asked in the post-race press conference what his victory meant to him, he exclaimed, "Millions, man, we're talkin' millions!" However, in a February 21, 1984 appearance on The Tonight Show—Season 22, Episode 89—Johnson clarified this quote as a misquote. On the show he explained to Johnny Carson that the actual question was "How much money would it be worth to ya, not what the Olympic gold meant to me personally."

== Post-Olympic decline ==
After two more World Cup downhill victories in Aspen and Whistler in March 1984, Johnson was at the top of his sport. With four downhill wins in just two months, he was an Olympic champion and finished third in the downhill season standings. But after the 1984 season, his best results were two 7th-place finishes: at Wengen in January 1985 and at Whistler in March 1986. His brashness made him unpopular with the European fans and competitors. Three days late to a training camp, his financial support was withdrawn in May 1985, but he returned to the team several months later.

Due to injuries to his left knee in December 1986 and back which required surgery, and more significantly, sagging results, Johnson was left off the U.S. team for the 1988 Winter Olympics in Calgary, unable to defend his gold medal. A month later he was suspended from the team and missed the final events of the 1988 season. It was later disclosed he had a locker room scuffle with an assistant coach in November 1987. By the end of the decade, he was done as a serious competitor; he retired after the 1990 season.

Soon after his Olympic win, Johnson openly voiced his strong opinions about amateurism in ski racing and the U.S. Ski Team's handling of his finances. He was featured in an episode of the television series "This is Your Life" on March 24, 1984. |url=https://www.imdb.com/title/tt13103188/ | He attempted to start a professional circuit of downhill racing in 1985 to compete with the World Cup, but it failed to gain momentum.

Johnson's Olympic career was the subject of a 1985 TV movie called Going for the Gold: The Bill Johnson Story, featuring future ER actor Anthony Edwards in the title role. It first aired in May and also included Dennis Weaver and Sarah Jessica Parker.

Johnson had two sons, named Tyler and Nick. Johnson's stated personal motto (tattooed on his arm) was "Ski To Die."

== Comeback attempt ==
Johnson's personal life suffered as well, when his 13-month-old son, Ryan, drowned in a hot tub in 1992. At age 40, his marriage ended in divorce, and he was bankrupt and living in his class A motorhome when he mounted an improbable comeback bid for the 2002 Winter Olympics in Salt Lake City. The comeback ended abruptly on March 22, 2001, when Johnson crashed during a training run prior to the downhill race of the 2001 U.S. Alpine Championships, held at The Big Mountain near Whitefish, Montana. He sustained serious injury to the left side of his brain, nearly bit off his tongue, and was comatose for three weeks.

In 2010, Johnson lived in Zigzag, near Mount Hood, and remained brain-damaged and in need of constant care, mostly from his mother. He became slightly more functional, though his speech and memory were permanently impaired.

Johnson had suffered a series of mini-strokes over the course of the previous ten years. Later in 2010, he fell victim to a massive stroke and was moved to a long-term care facility in Gresham. Due to the stroke, Johnson lost the ability to sit up unassisted and could no longer use his right hand. He also lost sight in his left eye and further lost the ability to speak above a whisper. He also suffered great pain when swallowing, which made feeding him difficult.

In June 2013, Johnson contracted an infection that nearly took his life. He was placed on life support while doctors worked to fight the infection. Johnson elected in July to remove himself from life support and refuse further treatment. He gave instructions that should something similar occur, his wishes were that he be allowed to die. Following a return to long-term care in February 2014, he was said to be free of infection, able to move one side of his body, eat and smoke with assistance, and communicate using a letter board. However, Johnson experienced worsening health over the next two years.

== Death ==
Nearly fifteen years after his accident at The Big Mountain, Johnson died at the age of 55 on January 21, 2016, at the care facility in Gresham.

== World Cup results ==
=== Season standings ===
Season	Age	Overall	Slalom	Giant Slalom	Super G	Downhill	Combined
1983	22	65	—	—	not awarded	27	25
1984	23	14	—	—	not awarded	3	—
1985	24	57	—	49	not awarded	24	—
1986	25	41	—	—	—	20	—
1987	26	(103)	injured in Dec 1986, out for season				
1988	27	(116)	no World Cup points				
1989	28	(103)	no World Cup points				
1990	29	(108)	no World Cup points				

- Points were only awarded for top 15 finishes (see scoring system).

=== Top ten finishes ===
- 3 wins – (3 DH)
- 3 podiums – (3 DH), 11 top ten finishes (11 DH)

Season	Date	Location	Discipline	Place
1983	February 11, 1983	St. Anton, Austria	Downhill	6th
1984	January 15, 1984	Wengen, Switzerland	Downhill	1st
1984	February 2, 1984	Cortina d'Ampezzo, Italy	Downhill	4th
1984	(Socialist Federal Republic of Yugoslavia) 1984 Winter Olympics			
1984	March 4, 1984	(United States) Aspen, CO, USA	Downhill	1st
1984	March 11, 1984	Whistler, BC, Canada	Downhill	1st
1985	January 19, 1985	Wengen, Switzerland	Downhill	10th
1985	January 20, 1985	Wengen, Switzerland	Downhill	7th
1986	January 18, 1986	Kitzbühel, Austria	Downhill	8th
1986	February 7, 1986	Morzine, France	Downhill	10th
1986	February 21, 1986	Åre, Sweden	Downhill	9th
1986	March 15, 1986	Whistler, BC, Canada	Downhill	7th

== Olympic results ==
Year	Age	Slalom	Giant Slalom	Super-G	Downhill	Combined
1984	23	—	—	not run	1	not run

== World championship results ==
Year	Age	Slalom	Giant Slalom	Super-G	Downhill	Combined
1985	24	—	—	not run	14	—

== Video ==
- YouTube video – 1984 Olympic downhill – ABC-TV broadcast – 1984-02-16
- YouTube video – Johnson's Whitefish crash – 2001-03-22
