= Gunnar Neuriesser =

Swedish alpine skier (born 1961)

Otto Gunnar Neuriesser (born 16 August 1961, in Karlskoga) is a Swedish former alpine skier who competed in the 1984 Winter Olympics.
