= Egon Hirt =

German alpine skier (born 1960)

Egon Hirt (born 16 August 1960 in Freiburg im Breisgau) is a German former alpine skier who competed in the 1984 Winter Olympics.
