= Tomaž Cerkovnik =

Slovenian alpine skier (1960–2004)

Tomaž Cerkovnik (29 June 1960 – 26 July 2004) was a Slovenian former alpine skier who competed for Yugoslavia in the 1984 Winter Olympics.
