= Robert Zoller =

Austrian alpine skier (born 1961)

Medal record

Men's alpine skiing

Representing Austria

World Championships
Bronze medal – third place	1985 Bormio	Slalom

Robert Zoller (born April 8, 1961) is a retired Austrian alpine skier.

He was born in Mühlbach am Hochkönig.

== World Cup victories ==
Date	Location	Race
March 6, 1984	(United States) Vail	Slalom
