= Sepp Wildgruber =

German alpine skier (born 1959)

Sepp Wildgruber (born 1 January 1959, in Oberaudorf) is a German former alpine skier who competed in the 1984 Winter Olympics, finishing 7th in the men's downhill.
