= Herbert Renoth =

German alpine skier (born 1962)

Herbert Renoth (born 5 February 1962 in Berchtesgaden) is a retired German alpine skier who competed in the 1984 Winter Olympics.
