= Jonas Nilsson =

Swedish alpine skier

Medal record

Men's alpine skiing

Representing Sweden

World Championships
| Gold medal – first place | 1985 Bormio | Slalom |

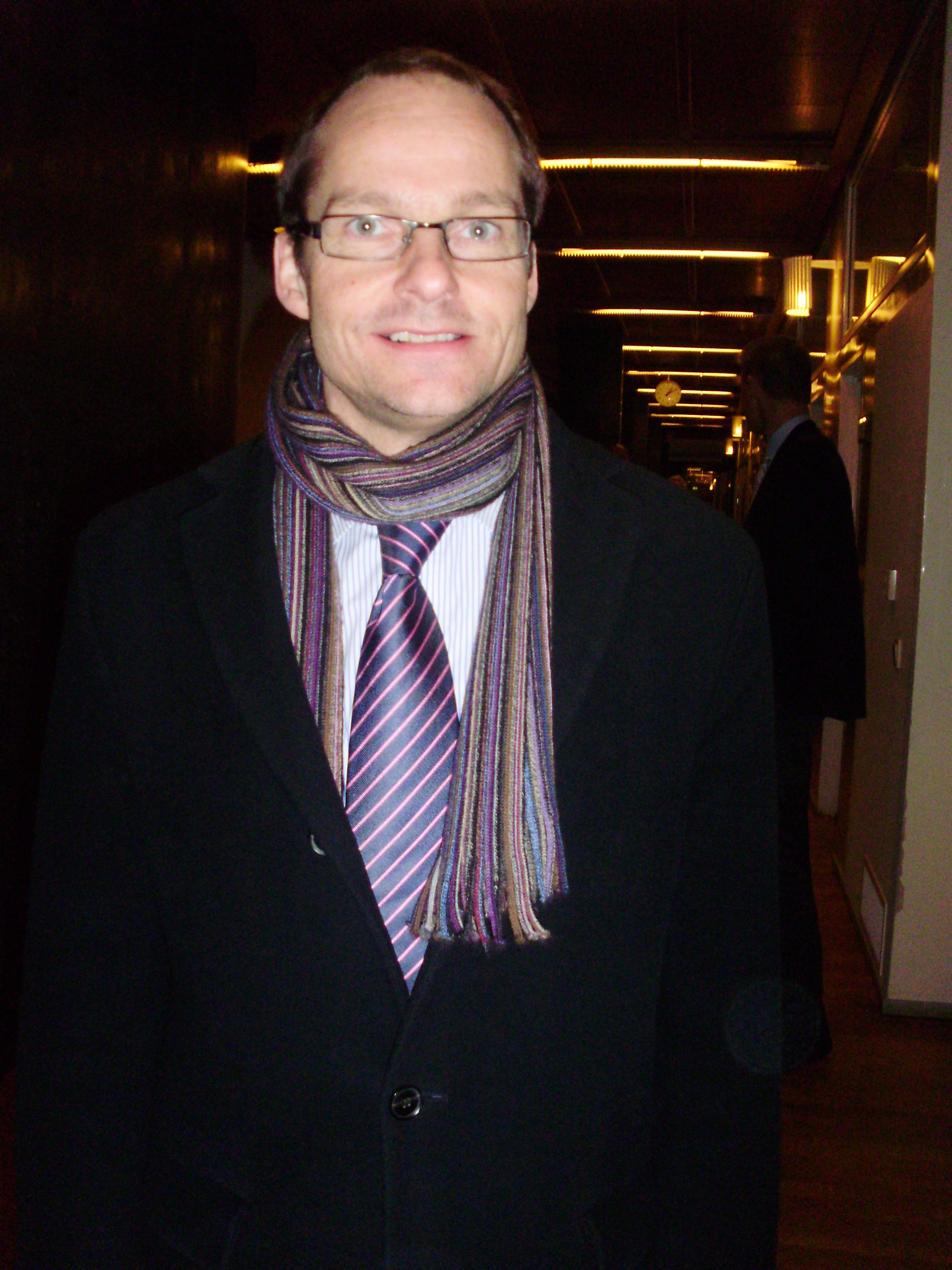
Lars Jonas Nilsson

Lars Jonas Nilsson (born 7 March 1963 in Hedemora, Dalarna) is a Swedish former alpine skier. He was born in Hedemora, which is located in Sweden. He competed at three Winter Olympics.

He raced in the Alpine Skiing World Cup from 1983 to 1992, obtaining two victories, both in slalom. He won the gold medal in Alpine World Ski Championships of 1985, in the same discipline.

== World Cup victories ==
| Date | Location | Race |
|---|---|---|
| 16 December 1985 | (Italy) Madonna di Campiglio | Slalom |
| 6 January 1990 | (Slovenia) Kranjska Gora | Slalom |
