= Panorama Mountain Resort =

Ski resort in British Columbia, Canada

- Location within British Columbia Location within Canada
- Location: British Columbia, Canada
- Nearest city: Invermere - 19 km (12 mi)
- Coordinates: 50°27′37″N 116°14′18″W
- Status: Operating
- Opened: 1962
- Owner: Panorama Mountain Village Inc
- Vertical: 1,300 m (4,265 ft)
- Top elevation: 2,450 m (8,038 ft)
- Base elevation: 1,150 m (3,773 ft)
- Skiable area: 2,975 acres (12.0 km^{2})
- Trails: 129; 15% easiest 35% more difficult 20% most difficult 30% Expert
- Longest run: 6.5 km (4.0 mi) (Wild Thing)
- Lift system: 10 total 1 gondola (village only), 6 chairlift, 1 platter 2 magic carpets
- Lift capacity: 8,500 per hr
- Terrain parks: 2
- Snowfall: 520 cm (200 in)
- Night skiing: Fri-Sat to 7 pm 1 chair, 3 runs
- Website: PanoramaResort.com

Panorama Mountain Resort is a ski and golf resort in Canada, located in the Purcell Mountains of southeastern British Columbia. Part of the Columbia Valley sub-region of the East Kootenay region, it is a tourist destination known for its rolling cliffs and views of the Rocky Mountains. It is privately owned by Panorama Mountain Village Inc.

== History ==
Panorama was founded in 1962 by Fritz Zehnder of Invermere and Guy Messerli of Switzerland, and some friends. The original facilities consisted of a warming hut, parking lot, and single rope tow, running on a V8, which ran transported users up the bottom of a ski run now known as "Old Timer". The area took its name from a nearby hiking area called the "Panorama Plateau".

In 1964, a platter, purchased from nearby Sunshine Village, was installed to replace the rope tow. During these initial years, the ski hill was volunteer-run.

In 1968, 12 local businessmen formed a group called Panorama Ski Hill Company Ltd to manage and grow the ski hill. A lodge, built in an A-Frame style, was built. In 1969, several slopes were cleared, the platter was moved to its present location as the current Silver Platter, and a mile-long wooden T-Bar was installed along the route of the current Mile 1 Express.

In the early 70s, Panorama Ski Hill Company continued to grow and required more area to accommodate more skiers. To raise capital for expansion, utilities were installed for 75 lots, which were sold near the base of the hill for development to raise money for the hill. Using the funds that they earned from the lots, a new double chair, named the "Horizon Chair", was installed. in 1975. The Horizon ran roughly three quarters along the path of the current Champagne Express lift.

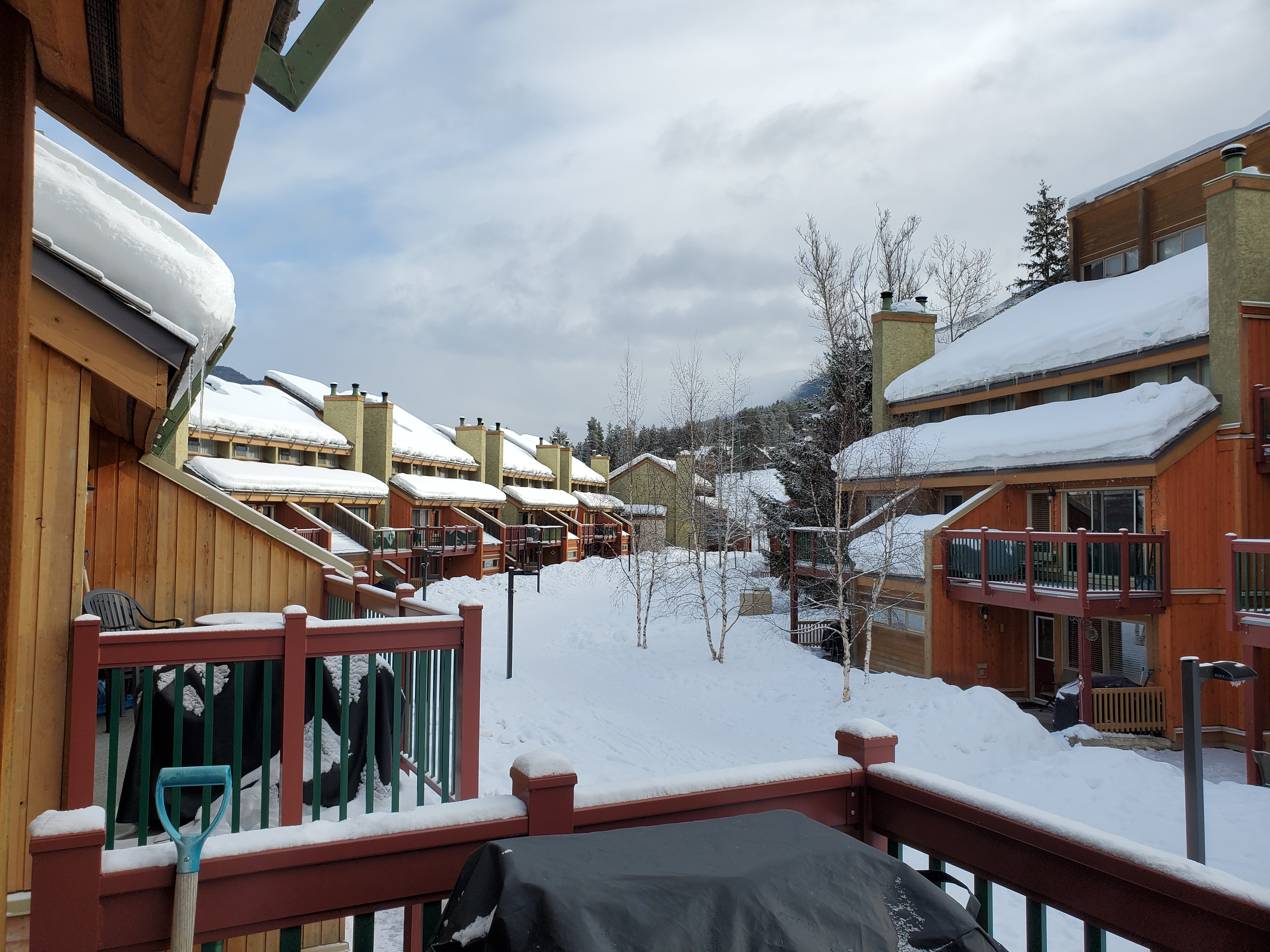
Horsethief Lodge

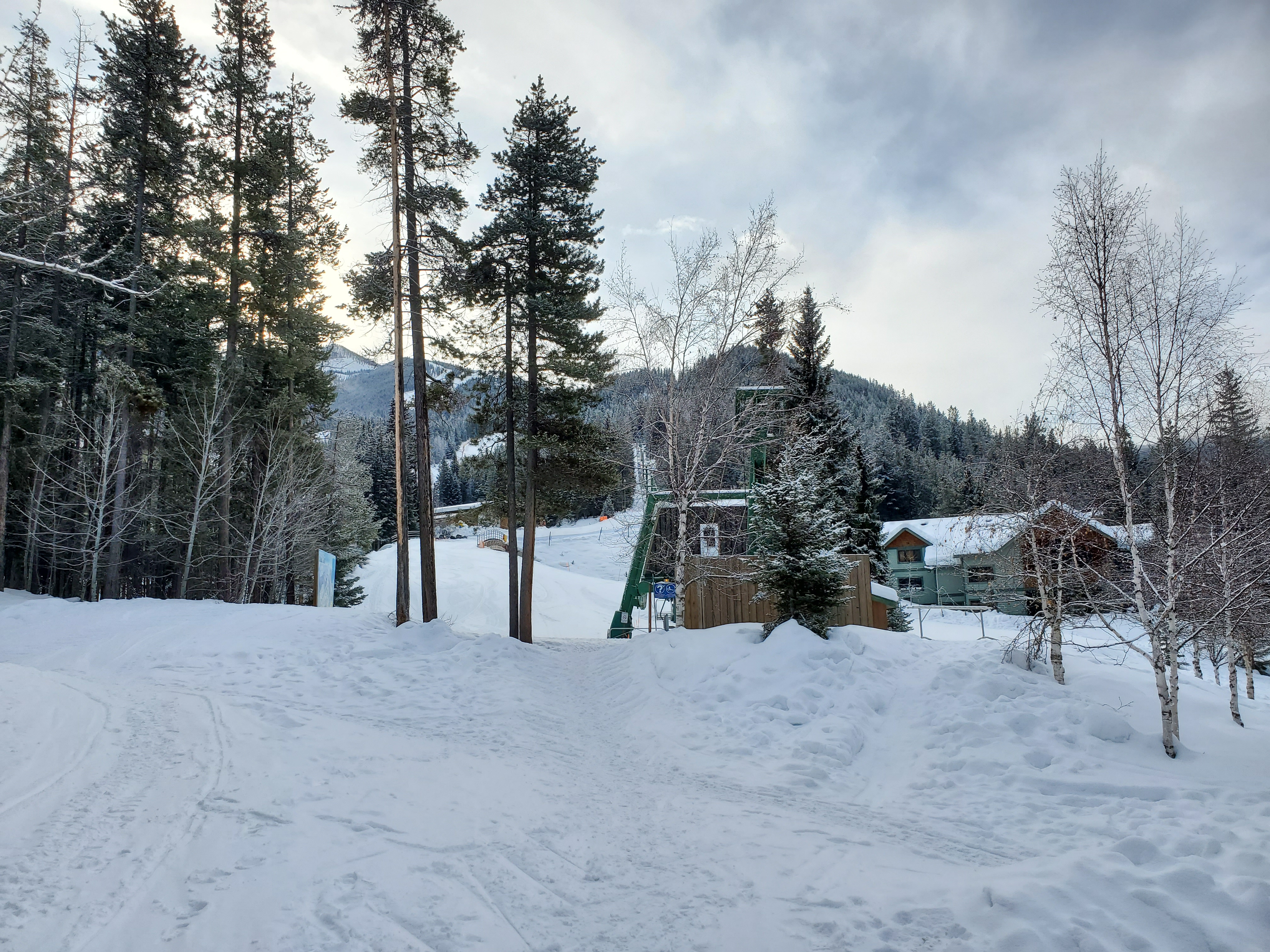
Toby Double Chair viewed from the Horsethief Lodge

In 1978, Panorama was purchased from Panorama Ski Hill Company by Calgary based Alan Graham and Cascade Development Group. With more available capital, Graham funded more facilities at the base of the hill the construction of the Toby Creek Lodge, in 1979, the Horsethief Lodge, Pine Inn, and tennis facilities, in 1982, and a conference centre in 1985. They expanded the ski hill, with the construction of the current Toby and Sunbird Chairs in 1980, snowmaking facilities in 1983, and Champagne T-Bar in 1984. The T-Bar was built, in part, to facilitate hosting the World Cup in 1985. In 1988, the original wooden T-Bar was replaced by the current Mile 1 Express quad chair.

In 1993, the hill was purchased by Intrawest. Intrawest brought fresh capital to the ski hill. A T-Bar was constructed to the summit immediately, opening up 200 acres of double black diamond terrain called the "Extreme Dream Zone". In 1997, Intrawest unveiled a master plan for the development of the resort, which included expansion of snowmaking, skiable area, the base village, and construction of the current Greywolf Golf Course. That year, the original A-Frame lodge was replaced. In 1999, a "pulse gondola", was installed a for use as a people mover. In 2001, in bounds backcountry style terrain was added, named Taynton Bowl. In 2003, the Horizon double chair and Champagne T-Bar were replaced by the Champagne Express, and the Summit T-Bar was replaced by the Summit Quad. In 2007, the Audi FIS Alpine Ski World Cup returned to the resort with Women's Giant Slalom and Slalom. Over the years, various real estate developments and accommodation facilities were added to the village.

In 2010, while Intrawest was under risk of foreclosure, a group of local private investors, called Panorama Mountain Village Inc, purchased Panorama Mountain Resort from Intrawest. In December 2014, the resort opened the Discovery Quad. The new chair goes from the learning area to the top of Stringer, a green run. It makes for a very natural and easy learning progression for people transferring from the carpet lifts to the chair lift. In 2017 and 2019, new terrain was added in the Taynton Bowl area, currently serviced by a 13 passenger snowcat called "Monster X".

Panorama is also frequented in the fall by race teams from around North America, including the Alpine Canada Alpin Canadian Alpine and Para-alpine ski ski teams. Panorama hosted its first World Cup races with Men's Downhill and Super G races in 1985. In all, Panorama has hosted eleven (11) World Cup races for Men & Women. In 2015 Panorama Hosted the Para-alpine World Championships and in 2022 Hosted the World Junior Alpine Championships.

== Expansion ==
In the Panorama Master Plan, there are plans to have another lift built in the Taynton Bowl area, and two additional lifts in and around the Sun Bowl area, named Hopeful Creek and Sun Bowl chairs.

== Statistics ==
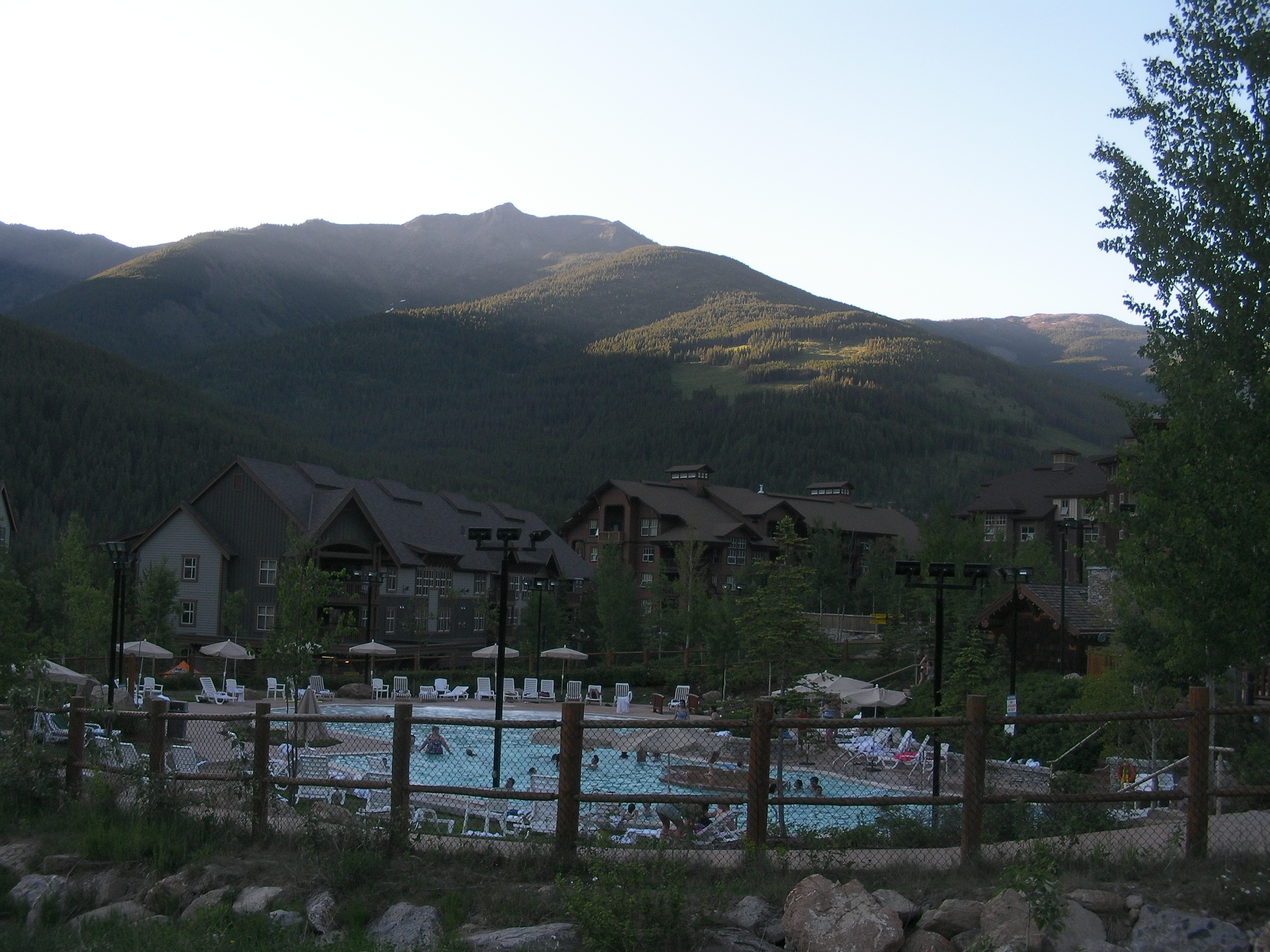
Pools and upper village

The ski resort is of above average size for North America, with 2,975 acres (12.04 km^{2}) of skiable lift-served terrain. This places it somewhere in the top ten in terms of area. It also has one of the largest vertical drops in North America, at 4,265 feet (1,300 m). In terms of continuously skiable vertical drop, with 1,300 metres (4,300 ft) it is 5th behind Revelstoke, Whistler Blackcomb, Jackson Hole, and Kicking Horse.

== Amenities ==
At the bottom of the ski hill there is a resort with lodging, restaurants, retail shops, and the Panorama Springs Pools complex. There is also the Panorama Nordic Centre with approximately 20.5 km of trail for classic and skating and 6.6 km for classic only. Approximately 4 km from the Nordic center there is the Hale Hut.

It is also home to BC's No1 public access golf course Greywolf, which winds along the Toby Creek Canyon.

The only way to access Panorama is via a road from the town of Invermere, located approximately 21|km/13mi away.
