= Jure Franko =

Slovenian-Yugoslav former alpine skier

Medal record

Men's alpine skiing

Representing Yugoslavia

Olympic Games
Silver medal – second place	1984 Sarajevo	Giant slalom

Universiade
Gold medal – first place	1985 Belluno	Giant slalom

Jure Franko (born 28 March 1962 in Nova Gorica) is a Slovenian-Yugoslav former alpine skier, best known for winning a giant slalom silver medal at the 1984 Winter Olympics in Sarajevo.

Jure Franko was born and raised in Nova Gorica, a city in Slovenia at the border with Italy. Franko competed in giant slalom and super giant slalom events, and reached the peak of his skiing career in the 1983–84 season. On 14 February 1984, at the 1984 Winter Olympics in Sarajevo, he won a silver medal in giant slalom. This was the first Winter Olympics medal ever for Yugoslavia. Franko was at the 4th position after the first leg of the giant slalom, and delivered the fastest time of the second leg, bringing him to second place overall (Max Julen from Switzerland took gold).

Franko also competed in the World Cup competitions, where he placed himself 3rd three times. In addition, he achieved 23 top ten positions, and 11 additional top 15 positions. He quit skiing after the 1984–85 season.

In January 2006, Jure Franko participated in the 2006 Winter Olympic torch relay, by relaying the torch from Slovenia to Italy at the Slovenian-Italian border in Nova Gorica. He also organised a trip for 43 children of modest economic backgrounds from Sarajevo, Nova Gorica and Gorizia to visit the giant slalom event at the 2006 Winter Olympic games in Turin, Italy.

He is the "Honorary Citizen of Sarajevo", an honor bestowed upon Slovenian skier by the City Council of Sarajevo at the session held on 30 September 2020.

Jure is sometimes confused with Jurij Franko, designer of the Elan SCX ski. The two attended the same school during the 1970s.

== World Cup results ==
=== Season standings ===
Season	Age	Overall	Slalom	Giant slalom	Super-G	Downhill	Combined
1980	17	68	—	24	not run	—	—
1981	18	—	—	—	not run	—	—
1982	19	60	—	25	not run	—	—
1983	20	32	33	8	not awarded (w/ GS)	—	—
1984	21	19	36	5	not awarded (w/ GS)	—	27
1985	22	38	—	12	not awarded (w/ GS)	—	—

=== Race podiums ===
Season	Date	Location	Discipline	Position
1984	10 December 1983	Val d'Isere, France	Super-G	3rd
1984	12 December 1983	Les Diablerets, Switzerland	Giant slalom	3rd
1984	20 March 1984	Oppdal, Norway	Super-G	3rd

== Olympic Games results ==
Season	Age	Slalom	Giant slalom	Super-G	Downhill	Combined
1980	17	—	12	not run	—	not run
1984	21	—	2	not run	—	not run

== World Championships results ==
Season	Age	Slalom	Giant slalom	Super-G	Downhill	Combined
1982	19	—	14	not run	—	—
1985	22	—	11	not run	—	—

== See also ==
- Aleksa Ivanc Olivieri

Awards
Preceded by Dragutin Šurbek	Yugoslav Sportsman of the Year; 1984	Succeeded by Dražen Petrović
Olympic Games
Preceded by Bojan Križaj	Flagbearer for Yugoslavia; Sarajevo 1984	Succeeded by Bojan Križaj
