= Ivano Marzola =

Italian alpine skier

Personal information
- Born: 5 October 1963 (age 62) Trieste, Italy

Skiing career
- Sport: Alpine skiing
- Retired: 1986
- Disciplines: Speed events
- World Cup debut: 1984

World Cup
- Seasons: 3

Ivano Marzola (born 5 October 1963) is an Italian former alpine skier.

== Biography ==
Although Marzola was born in Trieste he is from Val Gardena. He is the brother of the other Italian skier Michaela Marzola.

== World Cup results ==
Top 10

| Date | Place | Discipline | Position |
|---|---|---|---|
| 17-01-1986 | Austria Kitzbuehel | Downhill | 8 |
| 03-03-1985 | Japan Furano | Super G | 4 |
| 17-12-1984 | Italy Madonna di Campiglio | Super G | 7 |
| 18-12-1983 | Italy Val Gardena | Downhill | 5 |
| 10-12-1983 | France Val d'Isere | Combined | 5 |
