= Daniel Mahrer =

Swiss alpine skier

Personal information
- Born: 6 January 1962 (age 64) Chur, Switzerland

Skiing career
- Sport: Alpine skiing
- Club: SC Parpan
- Retired: 1996
- Disciplines: Speed events

World Cup
- Wins: 8
- Podiums: 23
Medal record
Men's alpine skiing
Representing Switzerland
World Cup race podiums
Event	1st	2nd	3rd
Downhill	7	8	6
Super-G	1	1	0
Total	8	9	6
World Championships
Bronze medal – third place	1991 Saalbach	Downhill

Daniel Mahrer (born 6 January 1962) is a Swiss former alpine skier. In 1991, he won the Bronze medal in Downhill skiing at the World Championship in Saalbach.

== Career ==
He competed at the 1988, 1992 and the 1994 Winter Olympics.

== World cup victories ==
Date	Location	Race
3 March 1985	(Japan) Furano	Super-G
7 December 1987	(France) Val-d'Isère	Downhill
24 January 1988	(Switzerland) Leukerbad	Downhill
14 January 1989	(Austria) Kitzbühel	Downhill
5 January 1991	(Germany) Garmisch-Partenkirchen	Downhill
7 March 1992	(Canada) Panorama	Downhill
14 March 1992	(United States) Aspen	Downhill
11 January 1993	(Germany) Garmisch-Partenkirchen	Downhill
