= Helmut Höflehner =

Austrian alpine skier

Personal information
- Born: 24 November 1959 (age 66) Steiermark, Austria

Skiing career
- Sport: Alpine skiing
- Club: TVN Haus
- Retired: 1994
- Disciplines: Speed events
- World Cup debut: 1987

Olympics
- Teams: 2

World Championships
- Teams: 3

World Cup
- Seasons: 8
- Wins: 10
- Podiums: 25
Medal record
Men's alpine skiing
Representing Austria
World Cup race podiums
Event	1st	2nd	3rd
Downhill	10	5	10

Helmut Höflehner (born 24 November 1959) is an Austrian former alpine skier.

== Career ==
In his career he has participated in two editions of the Olympic Games and three of the world championships.

== Achievements ==
1984 Winter Olympics in Sarajevo:

- fifth place at alpine skiing downhill

1984 Austrian Alpine Ski Championships:

- first place at alpine skiing downhill

1992 Winter Olympics in Albertville:

- 17th place at alpine skiing downhill

Alpine skiing World Championship 1985 in Bormio:

- seventh place at downhill

Alpine skiing World Championship 1987 in Crans-Montana:

- 14th place at downhill

Alpine skiing World Championship 1989 in Vail:

- seventh place at downhill

10 World Cup race victories at downhill
Two time Downhill World Cup winner 1984/85 and 1989/90
