= Oswald Tötsch =

Italian alpine skier (born 1964)

Personal information
- Born: 17 January 1964 (age 62) Sterzing, Italy
- Height: 1.74 m (5 ft 9 in)

Skiing career
- Sport: Alpine skiing
- Club: C.S. Carabinieri
- Retired: 1990
- Disciplines: Technical events

Olympics
- Teams: 2

World Championships
- Teams: 2

World Cup
- Wins: 0
- Podiums: 3
Medal record
World Cup race podiums
Event	1st	2nd	3rd
Slalom	0	1	1
Giant Slalom	0	0	1
Total	0	1	2

Oswald Tötsch (born 17 January 1964) is an Italian former alpine skier who competed in the 1984 Winter Olympics and 1988 Winter Olympics.
