= Thomas Bürgler =

Swiss alpine skier (born 1960)

Medal record

Men's alpine skiing

World Championships
Bronze medal – third place	1985 Bormio	Combined

Thomas Bürgler (born 3 March 1960 in Illgau, Schwyz) is a retired Swiss alpine skier. He competed in two events at the 1984 Winter Olympics.

== World Cup victories ==
Date	Location	Race
8 January 1985	(Austria) Schladming	Giant slalom
15 February 1985	(Socialist Federal Republic of Yugoslavia) Kranjska Gora	Giant slalom
