= Peter Müller (skier) =

Swiss alpine skier

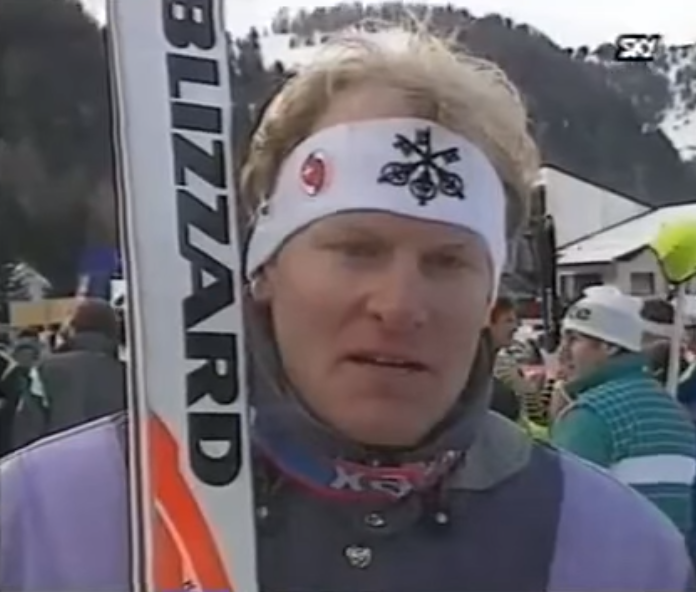
- Müller in 1988.

Personal information
- Born: 6 October 1957 (age 68) Adliswil, Switzerland
- Height: 184 cm (6 ft 0 in)

Skiing career
- Sport: Alpine skiing
- Club: Zürich-Lev

World Cup
- Overall titles: 0
- Discipline titles: 3
Medal record
Men's alpine skiing
Representing Switzerland
World Cup race podiums
Event	1st	2nd	3rd
Downhill	19	14	8
Super-G	2	0	1
Combined	3	2	2
Total	24	16	11
International podiums
Olympic Games
Silver medal – second place	1984 Sarajevo	Downhill
Silver medal – second place	1988 Calgary	Downhill
World Championships
Gold medal – first place	1987 Crans-Montana	Downhill
Silver medal – second place	1985 Bormio	Downhill
Silver medal – second place	1989 Vail	Downhill

Peter Müller (born 6 October 1957) is a former World Cup alpine ski racer from Switzerland.

== Career ==
A world champion in 1987 in the downhill, Müller was a silver medalist the downhill in two world championships (1985 and 1989) and two Olympic games (1984 and 1988).

Müller won the World Cup season title in the downhill in 1979, 1980, and 1982 (tied with Steve Podborski of Canada). Müller finished second in the World Cup downhill standings in 1985, 1986, and 1987. His best finish in the overall standings was fourth, which he achieved three times.

Müller retired from international competition following the 1992 season with 24 World Cup victories (19 downhill, 2 Super-G, 3 combined). Afterwards he competed in orienteering.

== World Cup results ==
=== Season standings ===
Season	Age	Overall	Slalom	Giant Slalom	Super G	Downhill	Combined
1977	19	24	—	16	not run	21	not awarded
1978	20	36	—	—	not run	18	not awarded
1979	21	15	—	39	not run	1	not awarded
1980	22	9	—	—	not run	1	—
1981	23	5	—	—	not run	3	3
1982	24	4	—	—	not run	1	13
1983	25	7	—	15	not awarded	7	7
1984	26	24	—	30	not awarded	14	11
1985	27	4	—	46	not awarded	2	3
1986	28	4	—	—	5	2	6
1987	29	9	—	—	—	2	—
1988	30	9	—	—	19	5	9
1989	31	12	—	—	18	6	8
1990	32	107	—	—	33	—	—
1991	33	63	—	—	—	23	—
1992	34	81	—	—	—	27	—

=== Season titles ===
Season	Discipline
1979	Downhill
1980	Downhill
1982^	Downhill

^ tie with Steve Podborski of Canada

=== Race victories ===
- 24 wins – (19 DH, 2 SG, 3 K)
- 51 podiums – (41 DH, 3 SG, 7 K), 113 top tens

Season	Date	Location	Discipline
1979	1 February 1979	Villars-sur-Ollon, Switzerland	Downhill
1980	16 December 1979	Val Gardena, Italy	Downhill
1980	6 January 1980	Pra-Loup, France	Downhill
1980	19 January 1980	Wengen, Switzerland	Downhill
1981	9 December 1980	Madonna di Campiglio, Italy	Combined
1981	14 December 1980	Val Gardena, Italy	Downhill
1982	27 February 1982	Whistler, Canada	Downhill
1982	5 March 1982	(United States) Aspen, USA	Downhill
1982	6 March 1982	(United States) Aspen, USA	Downhill
1983	12 December 1982	Val-d'Isère, France	Super G
1985	9 March 1985	(United States) Aspen, USA	Downhill
1985	16 March 1985	Panorama, Canada	Downhill
1986	27 January 1986	Garmisch, West Germany	Combined
1986	3 February 1986	Crans-Montana, Switzerland	Super G
1986	3 February 1986	Crans-Montana, Switzerland	Combined
1986	8 February 1986	Morzine, France	Downhill
1986	21 February 1986	Åre, Sweden	Downhill
1986	8 March 1986	(United States) Aspen, USA	Downhill
1987	15 August 1986	Las Leñas, Argentina	Downhill
1987	28 February 1987	Furano, Japan	Downhill
1987	14 March 1987	Calgary, Canada	Downhill
1988	16 January 1988	Bad Kleinkirchheim, Austria	Downhill
1988	12 March 1988	(United States) Beaver Creek, USA	Downhill
1989	9 December 1988	Val Gardena, Italy	Downhill

== See also ==
- List of FIS Alpine Ski World Cup men's race winners
