= Anton Steiner =

Austrian alpine skier

Personal information
- Born: 20 September 1958 (age 67) Lienz, Austria

Skiing career
- Sport: Alpine skiing
- Retired: 1988
- Disciplines: Speed events
- World Cup debut: 1979

Olympics
- Teams: 4
- Medals: 1

World Championships
- Teams: 5
- Medals: 1

World Cup
- Seasons: 9
- Wins: 5
- Podiums: 17
Medal record
Men's alpine skiing
Representing Austria
World Cup race podiums
Event	1st	2nd	3rd
Slalom	0	0	1
Downhill	2	3	3
Combined	3	2	2
Parallel	0	0	1
Total	5	5	7
International competitions
Event	1st	2nd	3rd
Olympic Games	0	0	1
World Championships	0	0	1
Total	0	0	2

Anton "Jimmy" Steiner (born 20 September 1958) is an Austrian former alpine skier.

== Biography ==
He was born in Lienz, Osttirol. He had 2 World Cup race victories at Downhill in 1986 when he finished eighth in the 1986 Downhill World Cup and 3 World Cup victories at Combined.

== Winter Olympics results ==
1980 Winter Olympics in Lake Placid:

- seventh place at Slalom

1984 Winter Olympics in Sarajevo:

- Bronze at Downhill

1988 Winter Olympics in Calgary:

- seventh place at Downhill

== World Championships results ==
FIS Alpine World Ski Championships 1978 in Garmisch-Partenkirchen:

- fourth place at Slalom
- fourteenth place at Giant slalom

FIS Alpine World Ski Championships 1982 in Schladming:

- Bronze at Combined

FIS Alpine World Ski Championships 1987 in Crans-Montana:

- fourteenth place at Combined
