= Martin Hangl =

Swiss alpine skier (born 1962)

Medal record

World Championships

Men's Alpine skiing
Gold medal – first place	1989 Vail / Beaver Creek	Super-G

Martin Hangl (born 17 June 1962) is a retired Swiss alpine skier. He won the gold medal in the Super-G at the WC 1989 in Vail. In addition he won three other world cup competitions. He also competed in three events at the 1988 Winter Olympics. Hangl withdrew from the 1988 Olympics men's giant slalom after he witnessed 47 year old Austrian Olympic Team physician Joerg Oberhammer's death from the chairlift. Oberhammer died after falling into the path of a snow-grooming machine after colliding with another skier between runs of the men's giant slalom.

== World Cup victories ==
Date	Location	Race
24 March 1988	(Austria) Saalbach	Super-G
25 March 1988	(Austria) Saalbach	Giant Slalom
8 January 1989	(Switzerland) Laax	Super-G
