= 2005 Alpine Skiing World Cup – Men's super-G =

2005 Men's Super G World Cup
Previous: 2004	Next: 2006

Men's Super G World Cup 2004/2005

== Calendar ==
Round	Race No	Place	Country	Date	Winner	Second	Third
1	3	Lake Louise	Canada	November 28, 2004	(United States) Bode Miller	(Austria) Hermann Maier	(Austria) Michael Walchhofer
2	4	Beaver Creek	United States	December 2, 2004	(Austria) Stephan Görgl	(United States) Bode Miller	(Austria) Mario Scheiber
3	11	Val Gardena	Italy	December 17, 2004	(Austria) Michael Walchhofer	(Austria) Hermann Maier	(Austria) Benjamin Raich
4	24	Kitzbühel	Austria	January 24, 2005	(Austria) Hermann Maier	(United States) Daron Rahlves	(Austria) Fritz Strobl
5	28	Garmisch-Partenkirchen	Germany	February 20, 2005	(Austria) Christoph Gruber	(Switzerland) Didier Défago	(Canada) François Bourque
6	32	Kvitfjell	Norway	March 6, 2005	(Austria) Hermann Maier	(Switzerland) Didier Défago	(United States) Daron Rahlves
7	34	Lenzerheide	Switzerland	March 11, 2005	(United States) Bode Miller (United States) Daron Rahlves		(Austria) Stephan Görgl

== Final point standings ==
In Men's Super G World Cup 2004/05 all results count.

Place	Name	Country	Total points	3 (Canada)	4 (United States)	11 (Italy)	24 (Austria)	28 (Germany)	32 (Norway)	34 (Switzerland)
1	Bode Miller	United States	470	100	80	50	45	50	45	100
2	Hermann Maier	Austria	453	80	32	80	100	32	100	29
3	Daron Rahlves	United States	362	45	15	22	80	40	60	100
4	Didier Défago	Switzerland	286	32	10	14	50	80	80	20
5	Michael Walchhofer	Austria	265	60	-	100	24	45	-	36
6	Benjamin Raich	Austria	262	40	26	60	36	26	50	24
7	Stephan Görgl	Austria	245	15	100	29	29	6	6	60
8	Marco Büchel	Liechtenstein	198	24	36	40	15	20	13	50
9	Mario Scheiber	Austria	166	36	60	24	12	10	24	-
10	Fritz Strobl	Austria	158	-	40	26	60	-	32	-
11	Aksel Lund Svindal	Norway	156	15	24	45	45	7	20	-
12	Christoph Gruber	Austria	151	9	-	22	20	100	-	-
13	Tobias Grünenfelder	Switzerland	135	6	50	11	26	8	2	32
14	Kjetil André Aamodt	Norway	134	20	13	16	32	-	8	45
15	Erik Guay	Canada	131	11	16	-	-	24	40	40
16	François Bourque	Canada	129	-	-	15	14	60	22	18
17	Hans Grugger	Austria	103	50	7	10	-	36	-	-
18	Ambrosi Hoffmann	Switzerland	93	26	18	-	4	9	18	18
19	Alessandro Fattori	Italy	92	2	45	9	-	-	36	-
20	Andreas Schifferer	Austria	87	15	4	-	-	20	26	22
21	Bruno Kernen	Switzerland	82	7	14	32	-	29	-	-
22	Lasse Kjus	Norway	70	16	20	8	-	-	-	26
23	Patrik Järbyn	Sweden	62	18	29	4	11	-	-	-
	Florian Eckert	Germany	62	29	5	1	-	13	14	-
25	Matthias Lanzinger	Austria	61	22	12	-	6	12	9	-
26	Konrad Hari	Switzerland	60	-	22	-	11	15	12	-
27	Didier Cuche	Switzerland	52	-	12	40	-	-	-	-
28	Bjarne Solbakken	Norway	48	2	10	13	13	-	10	-
29	Patrick Staudacher	Italy	46	-	-	12	3	16	15	-
30	Peter Fill	Italy	43	10	-	-	22	11	-	-
31	Hannes Reichelt	Austria	38	-	-	-	16	22	-	-
32	Jürg Grünenfelder	Switzerland	36	15	-	6	1	14	-	-
33	Antoine Dénériaz	France	34	8	8	18	-	-	-	-
34	Kristian Ghedina	Italy	32	-	-	-	-	-	32	-
35	Silvan Zurbriggen	Switzerland	21	-	-	-	-	5	16	-
36	Georg Streitberger	Austria	18	-	-	-	18	-	-	-
37	Michael Gufler	Italy	16	-	-	-	9	-	7	-
38	David Poisson	France	13	-	-	-	2	-	11	-
39	Andreas Ertl	Germany	12	5	-	-	7	-	-	-
40	Bryon Friedman	United States	9	4	-	5	-	-	-	-
	Pierre-Emmanuel Dalcin	France	9	4	3	-	-	2	-	-
42	Werner Heel	Italy	8	-	-	-	8	-	-	-
43	Sébastien Fournier-Bidoz	France	7	-	-	7	-	-	-	-
	Ole Magnus Kulbeck	Norway	7	-	1	-	6	-	-	-
45	Jan Hudec	Canada	6	-	6	-	-	-	-	-
	Max Rauffer	Germany	6	-	-	-	-	3	3	-
	Finlay Mickel	United Kingdom	6	-	-	3	-	1	2	-
48	Felix Neureuther	Germany	5	-	-	-	-	5	-	-
49	Yannick Bertrand	France	5	-	-	-	-	-	5	-
50	Manuel Osborne-Paradis	Canada	4	-	-	-	-	-	4	-
51	Paul Accola	Switzerland	2	-	2	-	-	-	-	-
	Scott Macartney	United States	2	-	-	2	-	-	-	-
	John Kucera	Canada	2	-	-	-	-	-	2	-

Note:

In the last race only the best racers were allowed to compete and only the best 15 finishers were awarded with points.

== Men's Super G Team Results ==
bold = highest score italics = race wins

Place	Country	Total points	3 (Canada)	4 (United States)	11 (Italy)	24 (Austria)	28 (Germany)	32 (Norway)	34 (Switzerland)	Racers	Wins
1	Austria	2007	327	281	**351**	321	309	247	171	12	5
2	United States	843	149	95	79	125	90	105	200	4	3
3	Switzerland	767	86	128	103	92	160	128	70	9	0
4	Norway	415	53	68	82	96	7	38	71	5	0
5	Canada	272	11	22	15	14	84	68	58	5	0
6	Italy	237	12	45	21	42	27	90	-	6	0
7	Liechtenstein	198	24	36	40	15	20	13	50	1	0
8	Germany	85	34	5	1	7	21	17	-	4	0
9	France	68	12	11	25	2	2	16	-	5	0
10	Sweden	62	18	29	4	11	-	-	-	1	0
11	United Kingdom	6	-	-	3	-	1	2	-	1	0

Note:

The last race saw two winners, both from the United States.
