= 2006 Alpine Skiing World Cup – Men's super-G =

2006 Men's Super G World Cup
Previous: 2005	Next: 2007

Men's Super-G World Cup 2005/2006

== Calendar ==
Round	Race No	Place	Country	Date	Winner	Second	Third
1	3	Lake Louise	Canada	November 27, 2005	(Norway) Aksel Lund Svindal	(Austria) Benjamin Raich	(United States) Daron Rahlves
2	4	Beaver Creek	United States	December 1, 2005	(Austria) Hannes Reichelt	(Canada) Erik Guay	(Austria) Matthias Lanzinger
3	11	Val Gardena	Italy	December 16, 2005	(Austria) Hans Grugger	(Canada) Erik Guay	(Switzerland) Ambrosi Hoffmann
4	22	Kitzbühel	Austria	January 20, 2006	(Austria) Hermann Maier	(Italy) Peter Fill	(Austria) Hannes Reichelt
5	28	Garmisch-Partenkirchen	Germany	January 29, 2006	(Austria) Christoph Gruber	(United States) Scott Macartney	(Norway) Kjetil André Aamodt
6	36	Åre	Sweden	March 16, 2006	(United States) Bode Miller	(United States) Daron Rahlves	(Norway) Aksel Lund Svindal

== Final point standings ==
In Men's Super-G World Cup 2005/06 all results count. Source:

Place	Name	Country	Total points	3 (Canada)	4 (United States)	11 (Italy)	22 (Austria)	28 (Germany)	36 (Sweden)
1	Aksel Lund Svindal	Norway	284	100	50	45	18	11	60
2	Hermann Maier	Austria	282	10	32	40	100	50	50
3	Daron Rahlves	United States	269	60	45	24	40	20	80
4	Hannes Reichelt	Austria	250	32	100	-	60	29	29
5	Kjetil André Aamodt	Norway	223	45	36	50	-	60	32
6	Erik Guay	Canada	204	24	80	80	20	-	-
7	Ambrosi Hoffmann	Switzerland	165	50	14	60	32	9	-
8	Peter Fill	Italy	162	11	16	9	80	10	36
9	Christoph Gruber	Austria	147	18	-	16	13	100	-
10	Bode Miller	United States	145	13	-	32	-	-	100
11	Stephan Görgl	Austria	144	6	15	12	50	16	45
12	Hans Grugger	Austria	133	15	18	100	-	-	-
13	Bruno Kernen	Switzerland	128	16	-	26	24	36	26
14	Matthias Lanzinger	Austria	126	10	60	7	7	20	22
15	Benjamin Raich	Austria	116	80	13	10	-	13	-
	Scott Macartney	United States	116	-	-	36	-	80	-
17	Marco Büchel	Liechtenstein	115	40	9	18	8	-	40
18	Michael Walchhofer	Austria	112	26	20	22	4	40	-
19	Fritz Strobl	Austria	108	36	22	-	36	14	-
20	Andreas Schifferer	Austria	105	22	12	29	16	26	-
21	François Bourque	Canada	96	5	24	15	12	24	16
22	Lasse Kjus	Norway	94	14	4	-	11	45	20
	Didier Défago	Switzerland	94	-	40	12	10	32	-
24	Patrik Järbyn	Sweden	93	29	7	-	29	4	24
25	Klaus Kröll	Austria	67	-	-	-	45	22	-
26	Patrick Staudacher	Italy	49	29	20	-	-	-	-
27	Tobias Grünenfelder	Switzerland	47	8	26	-	5	8	-
28	Didier Cuche	Switzerland	44	12	-	20	-	12	-
	Antoine Dénériaz	France	44	-	-	14	15	15	-
30	Bjarne Solbakken	Norway	41	7	10	-	24	-	-
	Konrad Hari	Switzerland	41	-	11	2	26	2	-
32	Walter Girardi	Italy	23	-	9	6	3	5	-
33	Steven Nyman	United States	19	-	6	13	-	-	-
	Michael Gufler	Italy	19	-	-	3	9	7	-
35	Rainer Schönfelder	Austria	18	-	-	-	-	-	18
36	Werner Heel	Italy	17	3	-	-	14	-	-
37	John Kucera	Canada	15	-	4	5	6	-	-
38	Alessandro Fattori	Italy	9	4	-	-	2	3	-
39	Marco Sullivan	United States	8	-	-	8	-	-	-
40	Jürg Grünenfelder	Switzerland	7	1	6	-	-	-	-
41	Andreas Ertl	Germany	6	-	-	-	-	6	-
42	A. J. Bear	Australia	4	-	-	4	-	-	-
43	Silvan Zurbriggen	Switzerland	2	2	-	-	-	-	-
	Luke Deane	Australia	2	-	2	-	-	-	-
45	Gauthier de Tessières	France	1	-	1	-	-	-	-
	Manuel Osborne-Paradis	Canada	1	-	-	1	-	-	-
	Stefan Thanei	Italy	1	-	-	-	1	-	-
	Pierre-Emmanuel Dalcin	France	1	-	-	-	-	1	-

Note:

In the last race only the best racers were allowed to compete and only the best 15 finishers were awarded with points.

== Men's Super-G Team Results ==
bold = highest score italics = race wins

Place	Country	Total points	3 (Canada)	4 (United States)	11 (Italy)	22 (Austria)	28 (Germany)	36 (Sweden)	Racers	Wins
1	Austria	1608	255	292	236	**331**	330	164	12	4
2	Norway	642	166	100	95	53	116	112	4	1
3	United States	557	73	51	113	40	100	180	5	1
4	Switzerland	528	89	97	120	97	99	26	8	0
5	Canada	316	29	108	101	38	24	16	4	0
6	Italy	280	47	45	18	109	25	36	7	0
7	Liechtenstein	115	40	9	18	8	-	40	1	0
8	Sweden	93	29	7	-	29	4	24	1	0
9	France	46	-	1	14	15	16	-	3	0
10	Germany	6	-	-	-	-	6	-	1	0
	Australia	6	-	2	4	-	-	-	2	0

**Alpine skiing World Cup**
**Men**

Overall | Downhill | Super-G | Giant Slalom | Slalom | Combined

**2006**
