= Bad Gastein displaced persons camp =

Jewish displaced persons camp in postwar Austria

- Jewish displaced persons camp
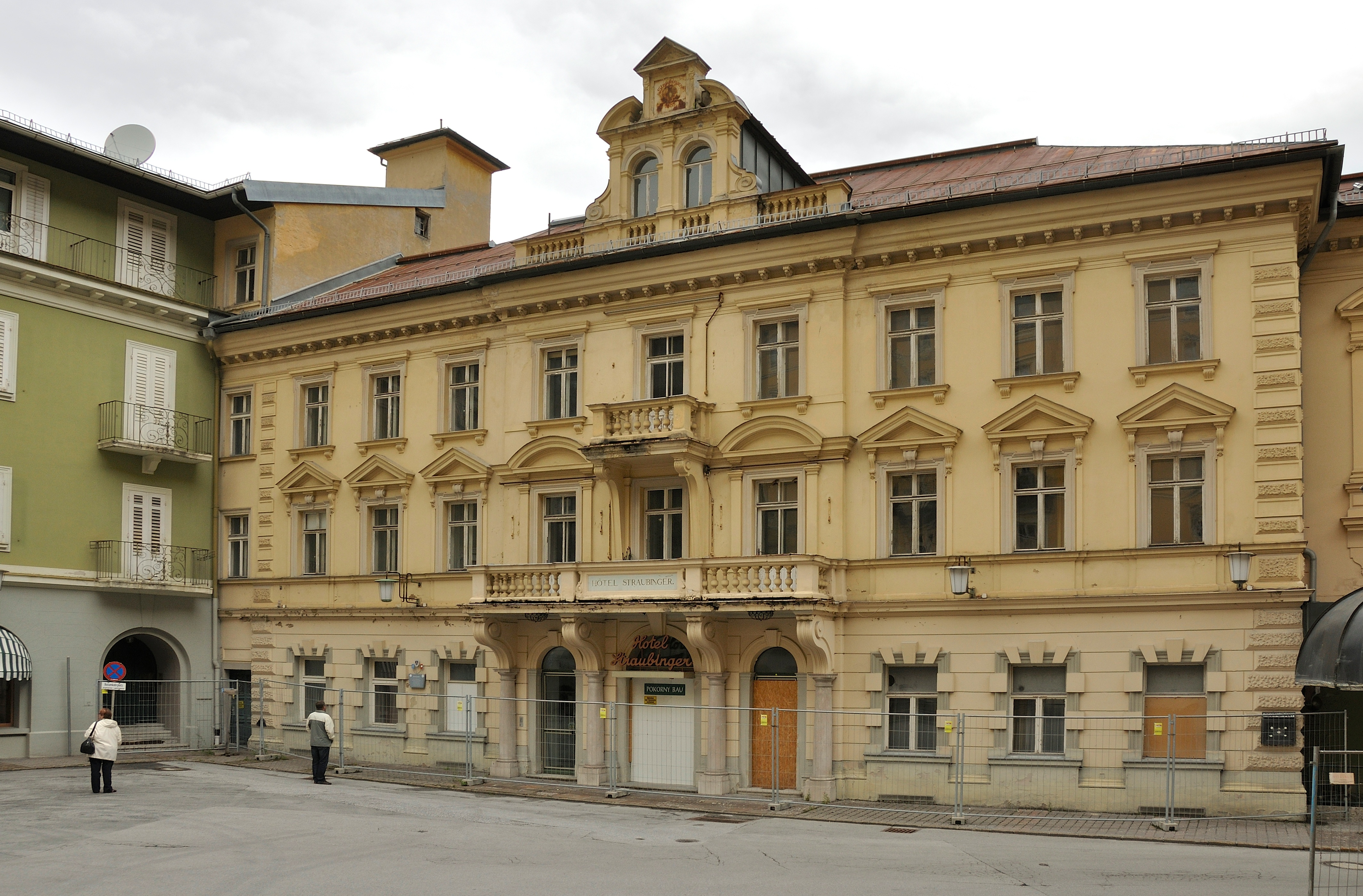
- Hotel Straubinger, one of the five requisitioned hotels used by the camp, photographed in 2012
- Location: Bad Gastein, Salzburg, Austria
- Occupation zone: American occupation zone
- Constituent sites: Hotel Straubinger; Badeschloss; Hotel Söntgen; Hotel Elisabeth; Villa Victoria
- Established by: United States military government
- Opened: October 1945 (five-hotel camp)
- DP operation: September 1945 private-lodging phase; October 1945–September 1947 hotel camp
- Closed: September 1947
- Administered by: UNRRA Team 322, to February 1947; United States military government, February–September 1947
- Resident leadership: Jakubowicz, chair of the central committee
- Supporting organizations: American Jewish Joint Distribution Committee
- Resident groups: Jewish displaced persons, primarily from Eastern and Central Europe
- Population: 1,247; 28 December 1945
- Functions: Residential accommodation and welfare; General and Jewish education; Vocational training; Religious services; Cultural activities
- Successor camps: Magen David camp, Ebelsberg, Linz (remaining residents)

The Bad Gastein displaced persons camp was a Jewish displaced persons (DP) camp in the spa town of Bad Gastein, in the state of Salzburg, Austria. It operated in the American occupation zone after the Second World War. Jewish refugees were first recorded in private accommodation in the town in September 1945, and in October the United States military government requisitioned five hotels—Straubinger, Badeschloss, Söntgen, Kurhaus Elisabethhof and Villa Victoria—to form a separate Jewish DP camp.

Unlike many postwar DP camps housed in barracks, Bad Gastein was dispersed among former tourist hotels and private lodgings. Day-to-day administration was undertaken by an eleven-member UNRRA unit, Team 322, while the United States military government in Salzburg retained ultimate authority. Residents developed an elected central committee, schools, adult education, vocational training, religious institutions, cultural organizations and political activity.

The principal residential camp closed in September 1947 after UNRRA had transferred control to the military government earlier that year. Approximately 430 remaining residents were transferred to the Magen David camp at Ebelsberg near Linz. Related Jewish DP institutions in the Gastein valley did not all end at the same time: a regional DP hospital operated in neighboring Bad Hofgastein, and a new Jewish convalescent home was opened in Bad Gastein after the residential camp had closed.

== Background ==
Bad Gastein had a substantial Jewish connection before the Second World War. Jewish visitors had frequented the spa for decades, while Jews also owned hotels, guesthouses, shops and other businesses in the town. After the 1938 Anschluss, Jewish property was expropriated and Jewish-owned businesses and hotels were attacked during the November pogrom. The remaining Jewish population was subsequently expelled or deported; hotels in the resort were also used as military hospitals for wounded German soldiers during the war.

In the immediate postwar period, Jewish survivors were among the large population of displaced persons in Austria. Many resisted repatriation to countries where their families and communities had been destroyed and sought separate accommodation from other categories of displaced persons. The July 1945 Harrison Report criticized conditions faced by Jewish survivors and recommended recognizing their particular circumstances and establishing separate accommodation for them.

Rabbi Eli Bohnen, a Jewish chaplain serving with the 42nd Infantry Division, proposed transferring Jewish refugees from the Linz area to Bad Gastein. The military government accepted the proposal and requisitioned empty hotels in the spa town. Approximately fifty Jews were already living in private accommodation in Bad Gastein in September 1945; the five-hotel camp was established the following month.

== Population and accommodation ==
The camp population changed continually as refugees arrived and departed, and registration did not capture every resident. Blumenthal estimates that between about 1,000 and 2,000 men, women and children lived in the camp during its operation. World ORT gives a rounded figure of about 1,500 Jewish residents in 1946.

A UNRRA report of 28 December 1945 recorded 1,247 residents. Of these, 886 were from Poland, 143 from Romania, 137 from Czechoslovakia and 38 from Hungary. The records also included 19 Austrians and Germans, most of them Austrian-born infants of Polish parents, and 13 Palestinian Jews awaiting transport. UNRRA classified 452 residents as sick people or as expectant or nursing mothers.

Although the use of spa hotels distinguished Bad Gastein from many barracks camps, conditions within the requisitioned buildings varied. Hotel bedrooms originally designed for one or two guests could contain bunk beds for as many as eight people, and running water and heating were not always available. Survivor accounts ranged from descriptions of sparse and crowded rooms to recollections of the accommodation as a major improvement over previous conditions.

Marriage and childbirth became prominent features of camp life. Archival records document marriages among residents and numerous births: eight children—three boys and five girls—were born in May 1946 and fourteen in November of that year.

== Administration and self-government ==
UNRRA appointed the eleven-member Team 322 to supervise everyday administration of the camp. The United States military government in Salzburg retained ultimate authority. Residents also created a representative structure of their own. Each of the five hotels elected five representatives, producing a 25-member central committee headed by a survivor identified in the surviving records as Jakubowicz.

The committee represented residents in dealings with UNRRA and did not function merely as an advisory body. Blumenthal records repeated disputes between it and the UNRRA administration, including disagreements over labor and the committee's claimed authority over aspects of the camp's internal economic administration and personnel.

Political organization also developed within the camp. A group calling itself the New Zionist Organization in Upper Austria at Bad Gastein wrote to the Anglo-American Committee of Inquiry on 20 February 1946. It called for the immediate admission of 100,000 Jewish survivors to Mandatory Palestine and for an organized program of subsequent Jewish immigration from Europe. The Jewish Central Committee in Austria also broadcast programs to Bad Gastein and other camps.

== Education, vocational training and cultural life ==
Residents established a kindergarten and schools with assistance from the American Jewish Joint Distribution Committee (JDC). The Chaim Nachman Bialik school, named for Hayim Nahman Bialik, taught 85 children. Its curriculum included Hebrew, Jewish history, mathematics, geography, science and religion.

The camp's culture commission also established a People's University (Volksuniversität) for adult education. Camp residents taught Hebrew and English to 156 refugees and organized public meetings on religious, moral and educational subjects. The camp published a Yiddish-language newspaper called Le'an ("Where to?"), and in November 1946 residents held a Blau-Weiss ball to raise funds for the Jewish National Fund.

The United States Holocaust Memorial Museum records an elementary school, a high school, the People's University and a broad vocational program. Training included tailoring, millinery, barbering, photography, leather work, shoemaking and shoe repair, carpentry, cabinetmaking and home economics. The camp also maintained a theater group and a choir.

== Religion and welfare ==
Jewish religious practice was re-established as part of camp life. The camp had a synagogue and a Talmud Torah, while rabbis officiated at marriages and religious festivals and fast days were publicly observed.

For Passover in 1946, UNRRA officials arranged for suitable wheat to be ground at a mill in St. Johann and for a bakery in Hofgastein to be cleaned for the production of matzah. Baking continued day and night so that the camp population could observe Passover. During the summer the local rabbinate also posted the beginning and ending times for the Tisha B'Av fast.

Material welfare was supplied by the occupation authorities, UNRRA and Jewish relief organizations. Residents received supplementary food, and the JDC sent food and clothing to the camp. In February 1947 alone, the JDC shipped 7,259 kilograms of food to Bad Gastein. Residents also produced clothing in camp workshops.

An Orthodox Batia girls' group was active at Bad Gastein by December 1946, when its members were photographed there.

== Relations with the local population ==
Relations between Jewish displaced persons and parts of the local population were at times hostile. Blumenthal documents complaints by the camp's central committee about merchants who refused to sell goods to Jewish customers and made antisemitic remarks. In another incident, local men assaulted Jewish displaced persons in a Bad Gastein café; after a complaint was filed, the Salzburg Military Court convicted the attackers and imposed prison sentences ranging from eight to fifteen months.

Residents also organized a self-defense group known as the Partizanski Gruppe. Survivor testimony cited by Blumenthal describes both antisemitic hostility outside the camp and the greater personal freedom experienced by residents compared with their wartime circumstances.

== Medical facilities in Bad Hofgastein ==
Medical facilities associated with the regional DP population operated in neighboring Bad Hofgastein, which was distinct from the five-hotel residential camp in Bad Gastein. The USHMM describes the Hofgastein DP hospital as a major late-1940s medical facility equipped for surgery, physiotherapy, obstetrics and X-ray examinations.

World ORT operated a nurse-aide training course at the Hofgastein hospital for approximately twenty students. ORT described it as the first course of its kind that the organization operated in Austria. The hospital and its vocational program formed part of the broader medical and training infrastructure serving displaced persons in the Gastein valley rather than one of the five residential hotel constituencies in Bad Gastein.

== Closure and transfer to Ebelsberg ==
UNRRA relinquished control of the Bad Gastein camp to the United States military government in February 1947 as UNRRA reduced its operations. The military government administered the camp during its final months.

The residential camp closed in September 1947. Blumenthal records that approximately 430 remaining displaced persons were transferred to the Magen David (Star of David) camp at Ebelsberg near Linz. A contemporary Jewish Telegraphic Agency report dated 12 September 1947 likewise reported the arrival at Ebelsberg of 430 people from Bad Gastein, alongside 270 from Bad Ischl.

Blumenthal attributes the comparatively early closure, before the establishment of the State of Israel, to Austrian demands to recover Bad Gastein's spa and therapeutic facilities for civilian use. Property disputes accompanied the process. In January 1947 the governor of Salzburg sought between 12 and 15 million Austrian schillings in compensation for alleged damage to the hotels, including damaged plumbing, baths, floors, ceilings and furniture. The American military government rejected the demand.

Published sources give conflicting dates for the camp's closure. The USHMM Holocaust Encyclopedia gives 25 March 1946 as the closing date and reports approximately 1,330 Jewish residents on that date. Blumenthal's later study documents resident government, births, education, religious observance and other organized activity throughout 1946 and into 1947, and dates the closure to September 1947. The September chronology is also accompanied by the contemporary JTA report documenting the transfer of 430 people from Bad Gastein to Ebelsberg.

== Convalescent home and later Jewish presence ==
Closure of the five-hotel residential camp did not end organized Jewish use of Bad Gastein. Blumenthal reports that a new Jewish convalescent home intended for displaced persons opened in Bad Gastein on 5 November 1947. Patients generally spent three to six weeks recuperating there. A Jewish Telegraphic Agency report of 8 December 1948 also referred to a convalescent home for Jewish displaced persons at Bad Gastein.

Jewish visitors also began returning to Bad Gastein after the DP camp closed, including former displaced persons and other Jewish visitors from Austria and abroad. Bad Gastein subsequently re-emerged for several decades as a destination for Jewish tourists and former refugees.

== See also ==
- Displaced persons camps in post–World War II Europe
- Sh'erit ha-Pletah
- History of the Jews in Austria
- Aliyah Bet
