= 2004–05 FIS Alpine Ski World Cup =

International sports competition

FIS Alpine Ski World Cup 2004/05
| Discipline | Men | Women |
| Overall | (United States) Bode Miller | (Sweden) Anja Pärson |
| Downhill | (Austria) Michael Walchhofer | (Austria) Renate Götschl |
| Super-G | (United States) Bode Miller | (Austria) Michaela Dorfmeister |
| Giant slalom | (Austria) Benjamin Raich | (Finland) Tanja Poutiainen |
| Slalom | (Austria) Benjamin Raich | (Finland) Tanja Poutiainen |
| Super combined (unofficial) | (Austria) Benjamin Raich | (Croatia) Janica Kostelić |
- Nations Cup: Austria

Competition
| Locations | 18 | 13 |
| Individual | 36 | 33 |
| Cancelled | 1 | — |
| Rescheduled | 2 | — |

The 39th World Cup season began in October 2004 in Sölden, Austria, and concluded in March 2005 at the World Cup finals in Lenzerheide, Switzerland. The overall winners were Bode Miller of the U.S. and Anja Pärson of Sweden.

The break in the schedule was for the 2005 World Championships, held in Bormio, Italy, between 28 January and 13 February 2005. The women's competition was held in the neighboring skiing area of Santa Caterina.

== Calendar ==
=== Men ===
Event key: DH – Downhill, SL – Slalom, GS – Giant slalom, SG – Super giant slalom, KB – Classic Combined, SC – Super combined
| Race | Season | Date | Place | Type | Winner | Second | Third |
|---|---|---|---|---|---|---|---|
| 1189 | 1 | 26 October 2004 | (Austria) Sölden | GS _{296} | (United States) Bode Miller | (Italy) Massimiliano Blardone | (Finland) Kalle Palander |
| 1190 | 2 | 27 November 2004 | (Canada) Lake Louise | DH _{348} | (United States) Bode Miller | (France) Antoine Dénériaz | (Austria) Michael Walchhofer |
| 1191 | 3 | 28 November 2004 | (Canada) Lake Louise | SG _{117} | (United States) Bode Miller | (Austria) Hermann Maier | (Austria) Michael Walchhofer |
| 1192 | 4 | 2 December 2004 | (United States) Beaver Creek | SG _{118} | (Austria) Stephan Görgl | (United States) Bode Miller | (Austria) Mario Scheiber |
| 1193 | 5 | 3 December 2004 | (United States) Beaver Creek | DH _{349} | (United States) Bode Miller | (United States) Daron Rahlves | (Austria) Michael Walchhofer |
| 1194 | 6 | 4 December 2004 | (United States) Beaver Creek | GS _{297} | (Norway) Lasse Kjus | (Austria) Hermann Maier | (Austria) Benjamin Raich |
| 1195 | 7 | 5 December 2004 | (United States) Beaver Creek | SL _{342} | (Austria) Benjamin Raich | (Italy) Giorgio Rocca | (Austria) Rainer Schönfelder |
| 1196 | 8 | 11 December 2004 | (France) Val-d'Isère | DH _{350} | (Austria) Werner Franz | (Liechtenstein) Marco Büchel | (Austria) Michael Walchhofer |
| 1197 | 9 | 12 December 2004 | (France) Val-d'Isère | GS _{298} | (United States) Bode Miller | (Norway) Lasse Kjus | (Austria) Hermann Maier |
| 1198 | 10 | 13 December 2004 | (Italy) Sestriere | SL _{343} | (United States) Bode Miller | (Switzerland) Silvan Zurbriggen | (Finland) Kalle Palander |
| 1199 | 11 | 17 December 2004 | (Italy) Val Gardena | SG _{119} | (Austria) Michael Walchhofer | (Austria) Hermann Maier | (Austria) Benjamin Raich |
| 1200 | 12 | 18 December 2004 | (Italy) Val Gardena | DH _{351} | (Germany) Max Rauffer | (Switzerland) Jürg Grünenfelder | (Austria) Hans Grugger |
| 1201 | 13 | 19 December 2004 | (Italy) Alta Badia | GS _{299} | (Canada) Thomas Grandi | (Austria) Benjamin Raich | (Switzerland) Didier Cuche (Austria) Hermann Maier |
| 1202 | 14 | 21 December 2004 | (Austria) Flachau | GS _{300} | (Canada) Thomas Grandi | (Switzerland) Didier Cuche | (United States) Bode Miller |
| 1203 | 15 | 22 December 2004 | (Austria) Flachau | SL _{344} | (Italy) Giorgio Rocca | (Austria) Rainer Schönfelder | (Germany) Alois Vogl |
| 1204 | 16 | 29 December 2004 | (Italy) Bormio | DH _{352} | (Austria) Hans Grugger | (Austria) Michael Walchhofer | (Austria) Fritz Strobl |
| 1205 | 17 | 8 January 2005 | (France) Chamonix | DH _{353} | (Austria) Hans Grugger | (Italy) Kristian Ghedina | (Austria) Michael Walchhofer |
| 1206 | 18 | 9 January 2005 | (France) Chamonix | SL _{345} | (Italy) Giorgio Rocca | (Austria) Benjamin Raich | (Sweden) Markus Larsson |
| 1207 | 19 | 11 January 2005 | (Switzerland) Adelboden | GS _{301} | (Italy) Massimiliano Blardone | (United States) Bode Miller | (Finland) Kalle Palander |
| 1208 | 20 | 14 January 2005 | (Switzerland) Wengen | SC _{087} | (Austria) Benjamin Raich | (Norway) Lasse Kjus | (Switzerland) Didier Défago |
| 1209 | 21 | 15 January 2005 | (Switzerland) Wengen | DH _{354} | (Austria) Michael Walchhofer | (Austria) Christoph Gruber | (United States) Bode Miller |
| 1210 | 22 | 16 January 2005 | (Switzerland) Wengen | SL _{346} | (Germany) Alois Vogl | (Croatia) Ivica Kostelić | (Austria) Benjamin Raich |
| | | 21 January 2005 | (Austria) Kitzbühel | SG _{cnx} | replaced in Kitzbühel on 24 January 2005 | | |
| | | 22 January 2005 | (Austria) Kitzbühel | DH _{cnx} | replaced in Garmisch-Partenkirchen on 18 February 2005 | | |
| 1211 | 23 | 23 January 2005 | (Austria) Kitzbühel | SL _{347} | (Austria) Manfred Pranger | (Austria) Mario Matt | (Croatia) Ivica Kostelić |
| | | 23 January 2005 | (Austria) Kitzbühel | KB _{cnx} | cancelled | | |
| 1212 | 24 | (Note: Super giant slalom from Kitzbühel was rescheduled from 21 to 24 January 2005.)24 January 2005 | (Austria) Kitzbühel | SG _{120} | (Austria) Hermann Maier | (United States) Daron Rahlves | (Austria) Fritz Strobl |
| 1213 | 25 | 25 January 2005 | (Austria) Schladming | SL _{348} | (Austria) Manfred Pranger | (Austria) Benjamin Raich | (Sweden) André Myhrer |
World Championships (28 January–13 February)
| 1214 | 26 | (Note: Downhill from Kitzbühel was rescheduled to Garmisch-Partenkirchen on 18 February 2005.)18 February 2005 | (Germany) Garmisch-Partenkirchen | DH _{355} | (Austria) Michael Walchhofer | (Austria) Hermann Maier | (United States) Bode Miller |
| 1215 | 27 | 19 February 2005 | (Germany) Garmisch-Partenkirchen | DH _{356} | (Austria) Michael Walchhofer | (Austria) Mario Scheiber | (Austria) Fritz Strobl |
| 1216 | 28 | 20 February 2005 | (Germany) Garmisch-Partenkirchen | SG _{121} | (Austria) Christoph Gruber | (Switzerland) Didier Défago | (Canada) François Bourque |
| 1217 | 29 | 26 February 2005 | (Slovenia) Kranjska Gora | GS _{302} | (Austria) Benjamin Raich | (Austria) Hermann Maier | (Finland) Kalle Palander |
| 1218 | 30 | 27 February 2005 | (Slovenia) Kranjska Gora | SL _{349} | (Italy) Giorgio Rocca | (Sweden) André Myhrer | (Austria) Benjamin Raich |
| 1219 | 31 | 5 March 2005 | (Norway) Kvitfjell | DH _{357} | (Austria) Hermann Maier | (Austria) Mario Scheiber | (Switzerland) Ambrosi Hoffmann |
| 1220 | 32 | 6 March 2005 | (Norway) Kvitfjell | SG _{122} | (Austria) Hermann Maier | (Switzerland) Didier Défago | (United States) Daron Rahlves |
| 1221 | 33 | 10 March 2005 | (Switzerland) Lenzerheide | DH _{358} | (Norway) Lasse Kjus | (United States) Bode Miller | (Austria) Fritz Strobl |
| 1222 | 34 | 11 March 2005 | (Switzerland) Lenzerheide | SG _{123} | (United States) Bode Miller (United States) Daron Rahlves | | (Austria) Stephan Görgl |
| 1223 | 35 | 12 March 2005 | (Switzerland) Lenzerheide | GS _{303} | (Austria) Stephan Görgl | (United States) Bode Miller | (Austria) Benjamin Raich |
| 1224 | 36 | 13 March 2005 | (Switzerland) Lenzerheide | SL _{350} | (Austria) Mario Matt | (Germany) Alois Vogl | (Austria) Rainer Schönfelder |

=== Ladies ===
Event key: DH – Downhill, SL – Slalom, GS – Giant slalom, SG – Super giant slalom, SC – Super combined
| Race | Season | Date | Place | Type | Winner | Second | Third |
|---|---|---|---|---|---|---|---|
| 1113 | 1 | 23 October 2004 | (Austria) Sölden | GS _{294} | (Sweden) Anja Pärson | (Finland) Tanja Poutiainen | (Spain) María José Rienda Contreras |
| 1114 | 2 | 26 November 2004 | (United States) Aspen | GS _{295} | (Finland) Tanja Poutiainen | (Sweden) Anja Pärson | (Croatia) Janica Kostelić |
| 1115 | 3 | 27 November 2004 | (United States) Aspen | SL _{330} | (Croatia) Janica Kostelić | (Sweden) Anja Pärson | (Finland) Tanja Poutiainen |
| 1116 | 4 | 28 November 2004 | (United States) Aspen | SL _{331} | (Finland) Tanja Poutiainen | (Italy) Manuela Mölgg | (United States) Kristina Koznick |
| 1117 | 5 | 3 December 2004 | (Canada) Lake Louise | DH _{288} | (United States) Lindsey Kildow | (France) Carole Montillet | (Germany) Hilde Gerg |
| 1118 | 6 | 4 December 2004 | (Canada) Lake Louise | DH _{289} | (Germany) Hilde Gerg | (Austria) Renate Götschl | (France) Carole Montillet |
| 1119 | 7 | 5 December 2004 | (Canada) Lake Louise | SG _{128} | (Austria) Michaela Dorfmeister | (Austria) Renate Götschl | (United States) Lindsey Kildow |
| 1120 | 8 | 11 December 2004 | (Austria) Altenmarkt | SG _{129} | (Austria) Alexandra Meissnitzer | (Italy) Lucia Recchia | (Slovenia) Tina Maze |
| 1121 | 9 | 12 December 2004 | (Austria) Altenmarkt | SL _{332} | (Finland) Tanja Poutiainen | (Austria) Marlies Schild | (Croatia) Janica Kostelić |
| 1122 | 10 | 21 December 2004 | (Switzerland) St. Moritz | SG _{130} | (Germany) Hilde Gerg | (United States) Lindsey Kildow | (Germany) Maria Riesch |
| 1123 | 11 | 22 December 2004 | (Switzerland) St. Moritz | GS _{296} | (Slovenia) Tina Maze | (Sweden) Anja Pärson | (Spain) María José Rienda Contreras |
| 1124 | 12 | 28 December 2004 | (Austria) Semmering | GS _{297} | (Austria) Marlies Schild | (Finland) Tanja Poutiainen | (Austria) Elisabeth Görgl |
| 1125 | 13 | 29 December 2004 | (Austria) Semmering | SL _{333} | (Austria) Marlies Schild | (Croatia) Janica Kostelić | (Finland) Tanja Poutiainen |
| 1126 | 14 | 6 January 2005 | (Italy) Santa Caterina | DH _{290} | (Austria) Michaela Dorfmeister | (United States) Lindsey Kildow | (Germany) Hilde Gerg |
| 1127 | 15 | 7 January 2005 | (Italy) Santa Caterina | DH _{291} | (France) Ingrid Jacquemod | (Austria) Renate Götschl | (France) Carole Montillet |
| 1128 | 16 | 8 January 2005 | (Italy) Santa Caterina | GS _{298} | (Slovenia) Tina Maze | (Canada) Geneviève Simard | (Canada) Allison Forsyth |
| 1129 | 17 | 9 January 2005 | (Italy) Santa Caterina | SL _{334} | (Austria) Marlies Schild | (United States) Kristina Koznick | (Germany) Monika Bergmann |
| 1130 | 18 | 12 January 2005 | (Italy) Cortina d'Ampezzo | SG _{131} | (Austria) Renate Götschl | (Sweden) Anja Pärson | (Germany) Martina Ertl |
| 1131 | 19 | 14 January 2005 | (Italy) Cortina d'Ampezzo | SG _{132} | (Austria) Renate Götschl | (United States) Lindsey Kildow | (Austria) Silvia Berger |
| 1132 | 20 | 15 January 2005 | (Italy) Cortina d'Ampezzo | DH _{292} | (Austria) Renate Götschl | (Croatia) Janica Kostelić | (United States) Lindsey Kildow |
| 1133 | 21 | 16 January 2005 | (Italy) Cortina d'Ampezzo | DH _{293} | (Austria) Michaela Dorfmeister | (Austria) Renate Götschl | (Germany) Hilde Gerg |
| 1134 | 22 | 20 January 2005 | (Croatia) Zagreb | SL _{335} | (Finland) Tanja Poutiainen | (United States) Kristina Koznick | (Austria) Marlies Schild |
| 1135 | 23 | 22 January 2005 | (Slovenia) Maribor | GS _{299} | (Slovenia) Tina Maze | (Italy) Karen Putzer | (Germany) Martina Ertl |
| 1136 | 24 | 23 January 2005 | (Slovenia) Maribor | SL _{336} | (Sweden) Anja Pärson | (Croatia) Janica Kostelić | (Finland) Tanja Poutiainen |
World Championships (28 January–13 February)
| 1137 | 25 | 19 February 2005 | (Sweden) Åre | SG _{133} | (Austria) Michaela Dorfmeister | (Austria) Alexandra Meissnitzer | (Italy) Lucia Recchia |
| 1138 | 26 | 20 February 2005 | (Sweden) Åre | GS _{300} | (Spain) María José Rienda Contreras | (Austria) Nicole Hosp | (Sweden) Anja Pärson |
| 1139 | 27 | 25 February 2005 | (Italy) San Sicario | SG _{134} | (Sweden) Anja Pärson | (Italy) Isolde Kostner | (Austria) Michaela Dorfmeister (Slovenia) Tina Maze |
| 1140 | 28 | 26 February 2005 | (Italy) San Sicario | DH _{294} | (Sweden) Anja Pärson | (Croatia) Janica Kostelić | (Germany) Hilde Gerg |
| 1141 | 29 | 27 February 2005 | (Italy) San Sicario | SC _{073} | (Croatia) Janica Kostelić | (Sweden) Anja Pärson | (Canada) Emily Brydon |
| 1142 | 30 | 10 March 2005 | (Switzerland) Lenzerheide | DH _{295} | (Austria) Renate Götschl | (France) Ingrid Jacquemod | (Germany) Hilde Gerg |
| 1143 | 31 | 11 March 2005 | (Switzerland) Lenzerheide | SG _{135} | (Austria) Michaela Dorfmeister | (Austria) Marlies Schild | (Sweden) Anja Pärson |
| 1144 | 32 | 12 March 2005 | (Switzerland) Lenzerheide | SL _{337} | (United States) Sarah Schleper | (Croatia) Janica Kostelić | (Austria) Nicole Hosp |
| 1145 | 33 | 13 March 2005 | (Switzerland) Lenzerheide | GS _{301} | (Spain) María José Rienda Contreras | (Finland) Tanja Poutiainen | (Austria) Nicole Hosp |

== Men ==
At the World Cup finals in Lenzerheide only the best racers were allowed to compete and only the best 15 finishers were awarded with points.

=== Overall ===
| Place | Name | Country | Total |
|---|---|---|---|
| 1 | Bode Miller | United States | 1648 |
| 2 | Benjamin Raich | Austria | 1454 |
| 3 | Hermann Maier | Austria | 1295 |
| 4 | Michael Walchhofer | Austria | 1012 |
| 5 | Daron Rahlves | United States | 984 |
| 6 | Didier Défago | Switzerland | 684 |
| 7 | Lasse Kjus | Norway | 580 |
| 8 | Fritz Strobl | Austria | 537 |
| 9 | Kalle Palander | Finland | 530 |
| 10 | Hans Grugger | Austria | 521 |

=== Downhill ===
In men's downhill World Cup 2004/05 the all results count.

| Place | Name | Country | Total | 2 (Canada) | 5 (United States) | 8 (France) | 12 (Italy) | 16 (Italy) | 17 (France) | 21 (Switzerland) | 26 (Germany) | 27 (Germany) | 31 (Norway) | 33 (Switzerland) |
|---|---|---|---|---|---|---|---|---|---|---|---|---|---|---|
| 1 | Michael Walchhofer | Austria | 681 | 60 | 60 | 60 | 11 | 80 | 60 | 100 | 100 | 100 | - | 50 |
| 2 | Bode Miller | United States | 618 | 100 | 100 | 50 | 18 | 18 | 32 | 60 | 60 | 50 | 50 | 80 |
| 3 | Hermann Maier | Austria | 451 | 45 | 29 | 5 | - | 24 | 32 | 50 | 80 | 36 | 100 | 50 |
| 4 | Daron Rahlves | United States | 444 | 50 | 80 | 36 | 18 | 40 | 45 | - | 45 | 45 | 45 | 40 |
| 5 | Hans Grugger | Austria | 418 | 13 | 22 | 9 | 60 | 100 | 100 | 20 | 50 | 12 | 14 | 18 |
| 6 | Fritz Strobl | Austria | 379 | - | 32 | 26 | 50 | 60 | - | 22 | 40 | 60 | 29 | 60 |
| 7 | Werner Franz | Austria | 254 | 10 | - | 100 | 20 | 26 | 12 | 45 | 26 | 4 | 11 | - |
| 8 | Mario Scheiber | Austria | 247 | 2 | 6 | 6 | 4 | - | 50 | 6 | 13 | 80 | 80 | - |
| 9 | Christoph Gruber | Austria | 242 | - | 14 | 14 | - | 29 | 40 | 80 | 14 | 15 | 36 | - |
| 10 | Marco Büchel | Liechtenstein | 237 | 8 | 24 | 80 | 12 | - | 6 | 7 | - | 24 | 40 | 36 |

=== Super G ===
In men's super G World Cup 2004/05 all results count.

| Place | Name | Country | Total | 3 (Canada) | 4 (United States) | 11 (Italy) | 24 (Austria) | 28 (Germany) | 32 (Norway) | 34 (Switzerland) |
|---|---|---|---|---|---|---|---|---|---|---|
| 1 | Bode Miller | United States | 470 | 100 | 80 | 50 | 45 | 50 | 45 | 100 |
| 2 | Hermann Maier | Austria | 453 | 80 | 32 | 80 | 100 | 32 | 100 | 29 |
| 3 | Daron Rahlves | United States | 362 | 45 | 15 | 22 | 80 | 40 | 60 | 100 |
| 4 | Didier Défago | Switzerland | 286 | 32 | 10 | 14 | 50 | 80 | 80 | 20 |
| 5 | Michael Walchhofer | Austria | 265 | 60 | - | 100 | 24 | 45 | - | 36 |
| 6 | Benjamin Raich | Austria | 262 | 40 | 26 | 60 | 36 | 26 | 50 | 24 |
| 7 | Stephan Görgl | Austria | 245 | 15 | 100 | 29 | 29 | 6 | 6 | 60 |
| 8 | Marco Büchel | Liechtenstein | 198 | 24 | 36 | 40 | 15 | 20 | 13 | 50 |
| 9 | Mario Scheiber | Austria | 166 | 36 | 60 | 24 | 12 | 10 | 24 | - |
| 10 | Fritz Strobl | Austria | 158 | - | 40 | 26 | 60 | - | 32 | - |
| 11 | Aksel Lund Svindal | Norway | 156 | 15 | 24 | 45 | 45 | 7 | 20 | - |
| 12 | Christoph Gruber | Austria | 151 | 9 | - | 22 | 20 | 100 | - | - |

=== Giant slalom ===
In men's giant slalom World Cup 2004/05 all results count.

| Place | Name | Country | Total | 1 (Austria) | 6 (United States) | 9 (France) | 13 (Italy) | 14 (Austria) | 19 (Switzerland) | 29 (Slovenia) | 35 (Switzerland) |
|---|---|---|---|---|---|---|---|---|---|---|---|
| 1 | Benjamin Raich | Austria | 423 | 20 | 60 | 3 | 80 | 50 | 50 | 100 | 60 |
| 2 | Bode Miller | United States | 420 | 100 | - | 100 | - | 60 | 80 | - | 80 |
| 3 | Thomas Grandi | Canada | 366 | 36 | 20 | 24 | 100 | 100 | 22 | 40 | 24 |
| 4 | Hermann Maier | Austria | 362 | 16 | 80 | 60 | 60 | 3 | 13 | 80 | 50 |
| 5 | Massimiliano Blardone | Italy | 345 | 80 | 18 | 20 | 36 | 12 | 100 | 50 | 29 |
| 6 | Kalle Palander | Finland | 303 | 60 | 15 | 40 | - | 32 | 60 | 60 | 36 |
| 7 | Lasse Kjus | Norway | 258 | - | 100 | 80 | - | 11 | 45 | 22 | - |
| 8 | Davide Simoncelli | Italy | 207 | 5 | 36 | 50 | 22 | 40 | 18 | 36 | - |
| 9 | Stephan Görgl | Austria | 206 | 3 | 45 | 26 | 6 | - | - | 26 | 100 |
| 10 | Fredrik Nyberg | Sweden | 203 | 32 | - | 18 | 15 | 24 | 40 | 29 | 45 |

=== Slalom ===
In men's slalom World Cup 2004/05 all results count.

| Place | Name | Country | Total | 7 (United States) | 10 (Italy) | 15 (Austria) | 18 (France) | 22 (Switzerland) | 23 (Austria) | 25 (Austria) | 30 (Slovenia) | 36 (Switzerland) |
|---|---|---|---|---|---|---|---|---|---|---|---|---|
| 1 | Benjamin Raich | Austria | 552 | 100 | 50 | 40 | 80 | 60 | 32 | 80 | 60 | 50 |
| 2 | Rainer Schönfelder | Austria | 408 | 60 | 29 | 80 | 29 | - | 50 | 50 | 50 | 60 |
| 3 | Manfred Pranger | Austria | 396 | 36 | 36 | 24 | 32 | 50 | 100 | 100 | 18 | - |
| 4 | Giorgio Rocca | Italy | 390 | 80 | - | 100 | 100 | - | - | 10 | 100 | - |
| 5 | Alois Vogl | Germany | 310 | - | 22 | 60 | 22 | 100 | 26 | - | - | 80 |
| 6 | Mario Matt | Austria | 294 | 29 | - | 45 | 40 | - | 80 | - | - | 100 |
| 7 | Ivica Kostelić | Croatia | 263 | - | - | 36 | 45 | 80 | 60 | - | 16 | 26 |
| 8 | Manfred Mölgg | Italy | 256 | 24 | 32 | - | 26 | 24 | 40 | 36 | 29 | 45 |
| 9 | André Myhrer | Sweden | 247 | 45 | 18 | - | - | 12 | - | 60 | 80 | 32 |
| 10 | Kalle Palander | Finland | 227 | 50 | 60 | - | 50 | - | 16 | - | 22 | 29 |
| 11 | Markus Larsson | Sweden | 191 | 12 | - | - | 60 | 45 | 29 | - | 45 | - |
| 12 | Silvan Zurbriggen | Switzerland | 170 | 11 | 80 | - | 36 | 32 | - | 11 | - | - |
| 13 | Jean-Pierre Vidal | France | 152 | - | 14 | 11 | - | 11 | 20 | 45 | 15 | 36 |
| 14 | Akira Sasaki | Japan | 144 | 22 | 45 | 26 | - | 29 | - | - | - | 22 |
| 15 | Bode Miller | United States | 140 | - | 100 | - | - | - | - | - | - | 40 |

=== Super combined ===
In men's combined World Cup 2004/05 only one competition was held.

| Place | Name | Country | Total | 20 (Switzerland) |
|---|---|---|---|---|
| 1 | Benjamin Raich | Austria | 100 | 100 |
| 2 | Lasse Kjus | Norway | 80 | 80 |
| 3 | Didier Défago | Switzerland | 60 | 60 |
| 4 | Daniel Albrecht | Switzerland | 50 | 50 |
| 5 | Kjetil André Aamodt | Norway | 45 | 45 |
| 6 | Pierrick Bourgeat | France | 40 | 40 |
| 7 | Christoph Gruber | Austria | 36 | 36 |
| 8 | Peter Fill | Italy | 32 | 32 |
| 9 | Markus Larsson | Sweden | 29 | 29 |
| | Hermann Maier | Austria | 29 | 29 |

== Ladies ==
At the World Cup finals in Lenzerheide only the best racers were allowed to compete and only the best 15 finishers were awarded with points.

=== Overall ===
| Place | Name | Country | Total |
|---|---|---|---|
| 1 | Anja Pärson | Sweden | 1359 |
| 2 | Janica Kostelić | Croatia | 1356 |
| 3 | Renate Götschl | Austria | 1295 |
| 4 | Michaela Dorfmeister | Austria | 1122 |
| 5 | Tanja Poutiainen | Finland | 1039 |
| 6 | Lindsey Kildow | United States | 914 |
| 7 | Hilde Gerg | Germany | 799 |
| 8 | Marlies Schild | Austria | 668 |
| 9 | Julia Mancuso | United States | 659 |
| 10 | Tina Maze | Slovenia | 650 |

=== Downhill ===
In women's downhill World Cup 2004/05 all results count. Renate Götschl won her fourth Downhill World Cup.

| Place | Name | Country | Total | 5 (Canada) | 6 (Canada) | 14 (Italy) | 15 (Italy) | 20 (Italy) | 21 (Italy) | 28 (Italy) | 30 (Switzerland) |
|---|---|---|---|---|---|---|---|---|---|---|---|
| 1 | Renate Götschl | Austria | 567 | 45 | 80 | 50 | 80 | 100 | 80 | 32 | 100 |
| 2 | Hilde Gerg | Germany | 495 | 60 | 100 | 60 | 45 | 50 | 60 | 60 | 60 |
| 3 | Michaela Dorfmeister | Austria | 432 | 50 | 32 | 100 | 15 | 45 | 100 | 50 | 40 |
| 4 | Janica Kostelić | Croatia | 387 | 20 | 26 | 36 | 45 | 80 | 50 | 80 | 50 |
| 5 | Lindsey Kildow | United States | 384 | 100 | 45 | 80 | 50 | 60 | 13 | 36 | - |
| 6 | Ingrid Jacquemod | France | 298 | 18 | 16 | 18 | 100 | 40 | 12 | 14 | 80 |
| 7 | Carole Montillet | France | 284 | 80 | 60 | 45 | 60 | 12 | 5 | 4 | 18 |
| 8 | Anja Pärson | Sweden | 209 | 15 | 14 | 1 | - | 2 | 45 | 100 | 32 |
| 9 | Sylviane Berthod | Switzerland | 207 | 36 | 22 | 40 | 11 | 18 | 40 | 40 | - |
| 10 | Julia Mancuso | United States | 170 | 16 | - | 9 | 20 | 14 | 32 | 29 | 50 |

=== Super G ===
In women's super G World Cup 2004/05 all results count.

| Place | Name | Country | Total | 7 (Canada) | 8 (Austria) | 10 (Switzerland) | 18 (Italy) | 19 (Italy) | 25 (Sweden) | 27 (Italy) | 31 (Switzerland) |
|---|---|---|---|---|---|---|---|---|---|---|---|
| 1 | Michaela Dorfmeister | Austria | 493 | 100 | 20 | 50 | 45 | 18 | 100 | 60 | 100 |
| 2 | Renate Götschl | Austria | 416 | 80 | - | 29 | 100 | 100 | 26 | 36 | 45 |
| 3 | Lindsey Kildow | United States | 396 | 60 | 20 | 80 | 50 | 80 | 36 | 20 | 50 |
| 4 | Anja Pärson | Sweden | 359 | 22 | 32 | 20 | 80 | - | 45 | 100 | 60 |
| 5 | Hilde Gerg | Germany | 296 | 50 | 26 | 100 | 14 | 29 | 32 | 45 | - |
| 6 | Alexandra Meissnitzer | Austria | 276 | 6 | 100 | 4 | 26 | 40 | 80 | - | 20 |
| 7 | Janica Kostelić | Croatia | 257 | 45 | 40 | 15 | 20 | 26 | 50 | 45 | 16 |
| 8 | Lucia Recchia | Italy | 240 | - | 80 | 45 | 24 | - | 60 | 15 | 16 |
| 9 | Tina Maze | Slovenia | 236 | 12 | 60 | 40 | 6 | 24 | 16 | 60 | 18 |
| 10 | Martina Ertl | Germany | 224 | 40 | - | 12 | 60 | 36 | 18 | 18 | 40 |

=== Giant slalom ===
In women's giant slalom World Cup 2004/05 all results count.

| Place | Name | Country | Total | 1 (Austria) | 2 (United States) | 11 (Switzerland) | 12 (Austria) | 16 (Italy) | 23 (Slovenia) | 26 (Sweden) | 33 (Switzerland) |
|---|---|---|---|---|---|---|---|---|---|---|---|
| 1 | Tanja Poutiainen | Finland | 461 | 80 | 100 | 45? | 80 | 40 | 36 | - | 80 |
| 2 | Anja Pärson | Sweden | 410 | 100 | 80 | 80 | - | 40 | 50 | 60 | - |
| 3 | María José Rienda Contreras | Spain | 384 | 60 | - | 60 | 40 | - | 24 | 100 | 100 |
| 4 | Tina Maze | Slovenia | 366 | - | 20 | 100 | 8 | 100 | 100 | 16 | 22 |
| 5 | Geneviève Simard | Canada | 241 | 7 | 14 | 26 | 16 | 80 | 22 | 36 | 40 |
| 6 | Nicole Hosp | Austria | 238 | 29 | - | 24 | - | - | 45 | 80 | 60 |
| 7 | Martina Ertl | Germany | 230 | 45 | 45 | 4 | 26 | - | 60 | 14 | 36 |
| | Julia Mancuso | United States | 230 | 16 | - | 40 | - | 50 | 45 | 50 | 29 |
| 9 | Karen Putzer | Italy | 226 | 26 | 29 | 50 | - | 15 | 80 | 8 | 18 |
| 10 | Elisabeth Görgl | Austria | 225 | 20 | 26 | - | 60 | 24 | - | 45 | 50 |

=== Slalom ===
In women's slalom World Cup 2004/05 all results count.

| Place | Name | Country | Total | 3 (United States) | 4 (United States) | 9 (Austria) | 13 (Austria) | 17 (Italy) | 22 (Croatia) | 24 (Slovenia) | 32 (Switzerland) |
|---|---|---|---|---|---|---|---|---|---|---|---|
| 1 | Tanja Poutiainen | Finland | 570 | 60 | 100 | 100 | 60 | 40 | 100 | 60 | 50 |
| 2 | Janica Kostelić | Croatia | 400 | 100 | - | 60 | 80 | - | - | 80 | 80 |
| 3 | Marlies Schild | Austria | 376 | - | - | 80 | 100 | 100 | 60 | 36 | - |
| 4 | Kristina Koznick | United States | 355 | 40 | 60 | 26 | 24 | 80 | 80 | 45 | - |
| 5 | Sarah Schleper | United States | 337 | 24 | 16 | 36 | 45 | 26 | 40 | 50 | 100 |
| 6 | Anja Pärson | Sweden | 301 | 80 | - | 50 | 45 | - | - | 100 | 26 |
| 7 | Nicole Hosp | Austria | 204 | 50 | - | - | 15 | 29 | 50 | - | 60 |
| 8 | Monika Bergmann-Schmuderer | Germany | 194 | 36 | - | 32 | 50 | 60 | - | 16 | - |
| 9 | Veronika Zuzulová | Slovakia | 185 | 22 | 32 | 11 | 26 | 50 | 24 | 20 | - |
| 10 | Nika Fleiss | Croatia | 183 | 7 | 29 | 29 | 13 | 15 | 32 | 18 | 40 |

=== Women's super combined ===
In women's combined World Cup 2004/05 only one competition was held.

| Place | Name | Country | Total | 29 (Italy) |
|---|---|---|---|---|
| 1 | Janica Kostelić | Croatia | 100 | 100 |
| 2 | Anja Pärson | Sweden | 80 | 80 |
| 3 | Emily Brydon | Canada | 60 | 60 |
| 4 | Nicole Hosp | Austria | 50 | 50 |
| 5 | Lindsey Kildow | United States | 45 | 45 |
| 6 | Julia Mancuso | United States | 40 | 40 |
| 7 | Renate Götschl | Austria | 36 | 36 |
| 8 | Resi Stiegler | United States | 32 | 32 |
| 9 | Marlies Schild | Austria | 29 | 29 |
| 10 | Brigitte Acton | Canada | 26 | 26 |
