= Taferne =

Gasthof Taferne
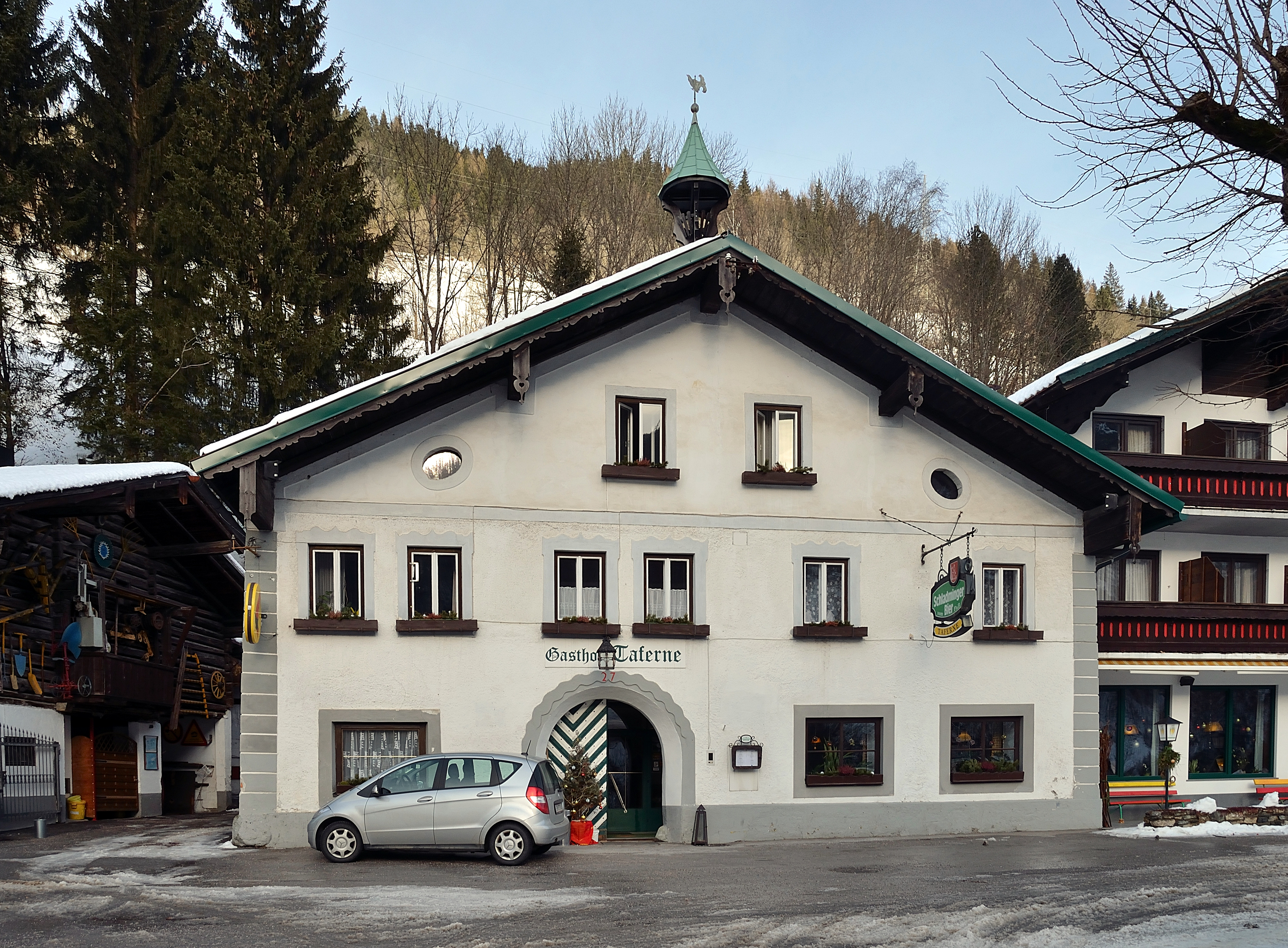
- Gasthof Taferne restaurant
- Industry: Hospitality
- Headquarters: Mandling, Schladming, Austria
- Website: https://www.taferne.at

Gasthof Taferne is an inn in Mandling village, which is part of Schladming, Austria. It is near the Schladming Tauern hiking area and the Ski Amadé winter sports area.
