= Dorfgastein =

Municipality in Salzburg, Austria

- Municipality
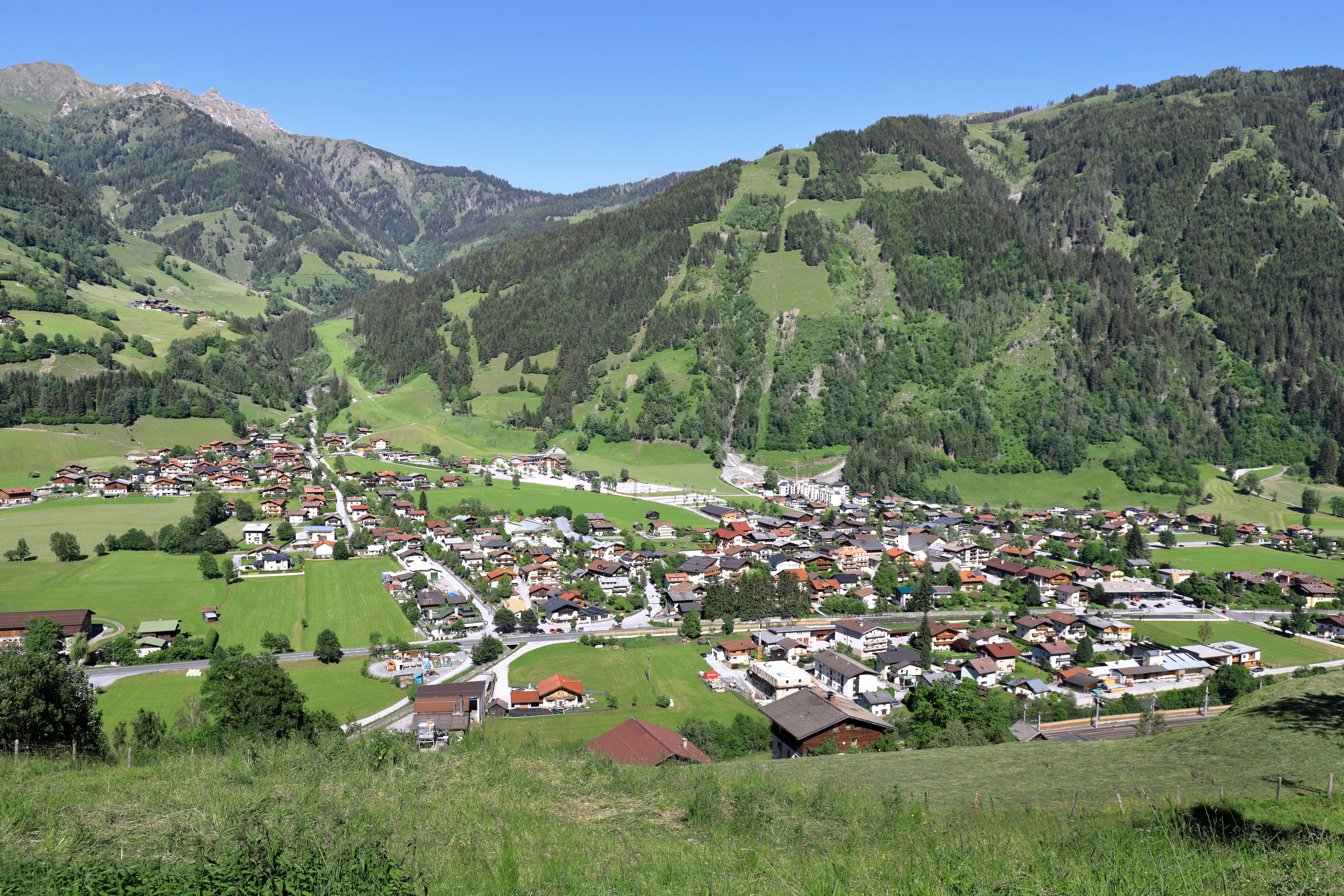
- View of Dorfgastein

- Coat of arms

- Location within Austria
- Coordinates: 47°14′33″N 13°16′0″E
- Country: Austria
- State: Salzburg
- District: St. Johann im Pongau

Government
  - Mayor: Rudolf Trauner (SPÖ)

Area
  - Total: 54.09 km^{2} (20.88 sq mi)
- Elevation: 812 m (2,664 ft)

Population (2018-01-01)
  - Total: 1,614
  - Density: 29.84/km^{2} (77.28/sq mi)
- Time zone: UTC+1 (CET)
  - Summer (DST): UTC+2 (CEST)
- Postal code: 5632
- Area code: 06433
- Vehicle registration: JO
- Website: www.dorfgastein.at

Dorfgastein is a municipality in St. Johann im Pongau District, in the Austrian state of Salzburg.

== Geography ==
It is located on the northern entrance of the Gastein Valley within the Hohe Tauern mountain range, south of the broader Salzach Valley. It is accessible by the Tauern Railway leading up to Bad Hofgastein and Bad Gastein, crossing the Alpine crest via the Tauerntunnel. The municipality consists of the cadastral communities of Dorfgastein and Klammstein.

== History ==
The bridle path through the Gastein gorge up to the Tauern passes was first mentioned in a 1212 deed. The village itself (ze Dorff), then part of the Archbishopric of Salzburg, was first documented in the oldest Gastein mining regulations of 1342. The St. Rupert parish church was founded in 1350.

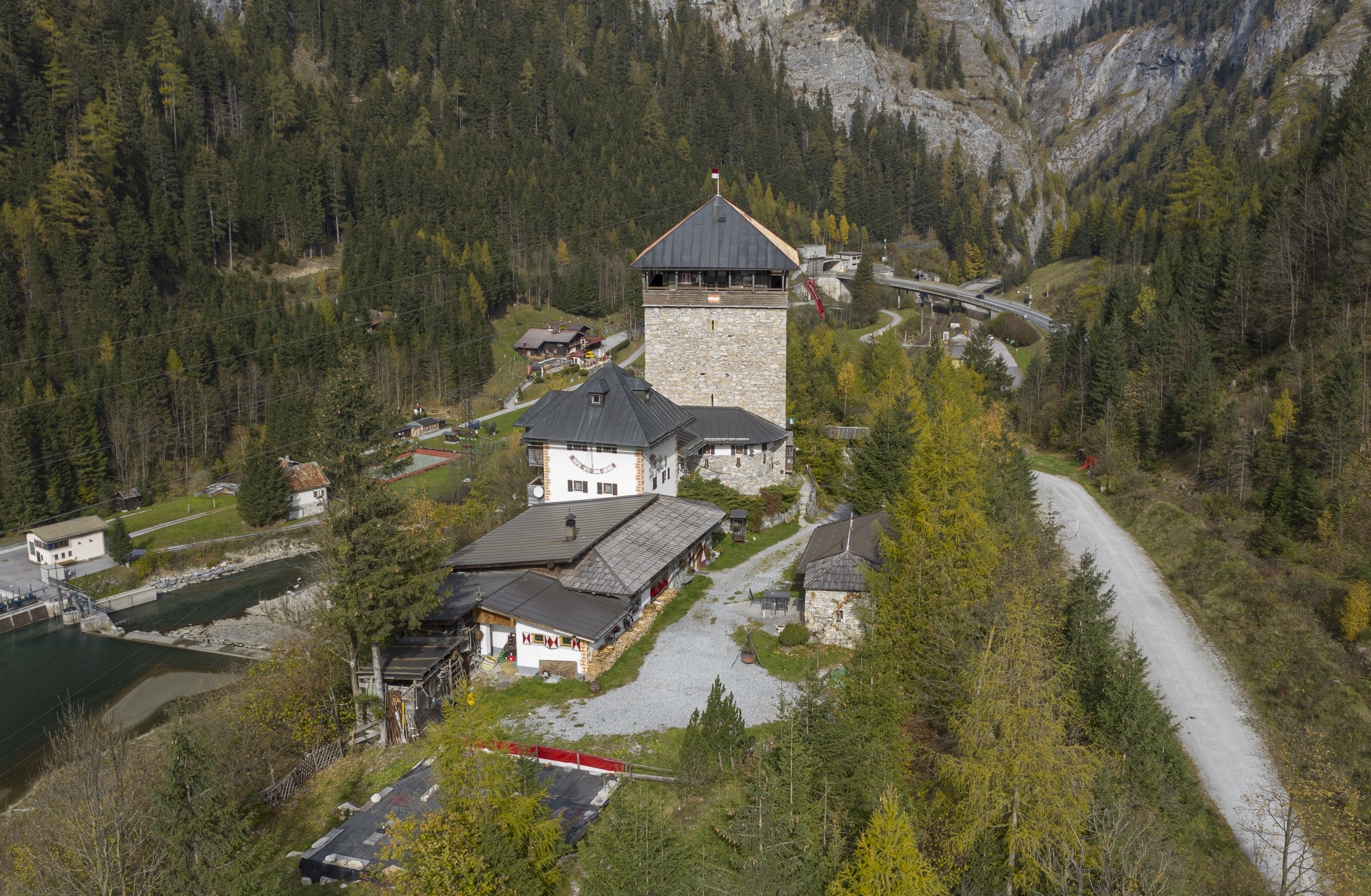
Klammstein Castle

For centuries Klammstein Castle erected high above the historic trade route in the 12th century, served as the administrative seat of the archbishops' keeper of the Gastein Valley. Temporarily held by the Bavarian counts of Ortenburg, it was acquired by the Salzburg archbishop Philip of Spanheim in 1251, whose ministeriales imposed tolls and secured the area at the valley entrance. The surrounding estates were finally incorporated into the Archbishopric of Salzburg in 1297 with the consent of the Bavarian dukes Otto III and Stephen I. The administrative seat was relocated to neighbouring Hofgastein, after Archbishop Leonhard von Keutschach transferred the castle to his relatives as a gift. In 1589 Archbishop Wolf Dietrich Raitenau allowed the demolition of the outer walls.

In 1735 the first school opened in Dorfgastein (with electric lighting in the classes from 1921). A telegraph office was established in 1893. A new school building was inaugurated in 1927.

The first Dorfgastein ski lift opened in 1959. Today the local Großarltal-Dorfgastein ski area is part of the larger Ski Amadé region.
