= Görgl =

Görgl is a Germanic-Austrian surname. Notable people with the surname include:

- Elisabeth Görgl (born 1981), Austrian alpine ski racer
- Stephan Görgl (born 1978), Austrian alpine ski racer, brother of Elisabeth
