= Ski Amadé =

Region of Austria

Coordinates: 47.3833°N 13.4667°E

Ski amadé

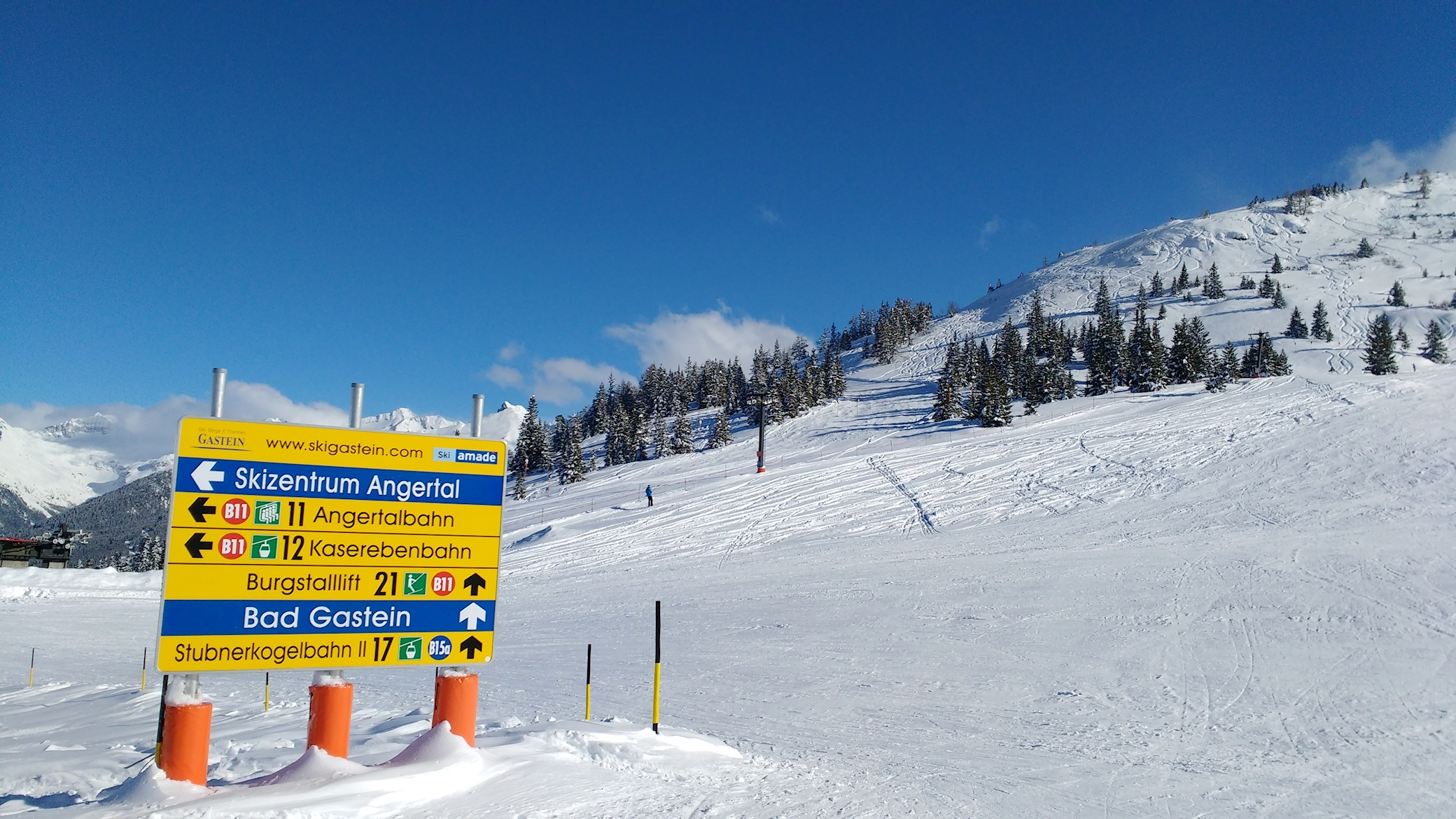
- Ski run in Gastein Valley resort
- Interactive map of Ski amadé
- Location: Salzburg and Styria, Austria
- Nearest city: Salzburg - 60 km (37 mi)
- Trails: ca. 356 (760 km): 145 blue (275 km); 181 red (390 km); 30 black (95 km)
- Lift system: 270 lifts: 97 chairlifts, 46 cabin lifts, 71 tows, 56 practice lifts
- Lift capacity: 375,000 passengers/hr
- Snowmaking: 90%
- Website: Ski amadé

The Ski Amadé region of Austria is a network of 28 ski areas and towns that combined, make up the second largest ski area in Europe. It is named after the composer Wolfgang Amadeus Mozart who was born in the city of Salzburg.

== Background ==
The resorts are linked by buses. There are 860 km of downhill slopes and 278 modern ski lifts, the highest lift being at the Dachstein Glacier with an altitude of 2,700 m. There are over 700 km of marked cross country Nordic skiing tracks.

== Five Regions ==
The resorts are made up of 28 villages across five principal regions that make up the alliance. The five regions are Salzburger Sportwelt, Dachstein Tauern, Gastein Valley, Hochkönig Ski Area, and Grossarl Valley.

== Geography ==
The ski region stretches from the south-east of Salzburg to the upper Styrian Ennstal, including the impressive mountain ranges of Steinernes Meer, Hochkönig, Dachstein and Tauernkamm.

Being in the Eastern Alps, thus being colder than the Western Alps the region has a good record of snowfall during the winter months.

== Interesting facts ==
- The resorts of Schladming/Planai, Reiteralm, Flachau and Zauchensee all have runs which are used for the annual Alpine Skiing World Cup circuit.
- Hermann Maier who has won four overall World Cup titles, two Olympic gold medals, three World Championship titles and 53 races in the Alpine Skiing World Cup circuit is from the Austrian Three Valleys area of Alpendorf, Wagrain and Flachau. With 53 champion races he is only second in place to being defined as the world's greatest skier; in front of him is Ingemar Stenmark from Sweden who has 86 victories.
- Scenes from the classic film The Sound of Music were filmed around the Salzburger Sportwelt region of the alliance. One scene in particular, where Julie Andrews is singing as she walks along a grassy verge was filmed near the resort of Alpendorf.
- The Gastein Valley resorts of Bad Gastein and Bad Hofgastein are highly renowned for their thermal baths as well as for their extensive skiing areas, and are supplemented by the mountains of Graukogel and Sportgastein offering more opportunities for intermediate and advanced skiers and freeriders. The ski lifts of the third town in the valley - Dorfgastein - are linked to the Grossarl Valley.
