= Monika Bergmann-Schmuderer =

German alpine skier (born 1978)

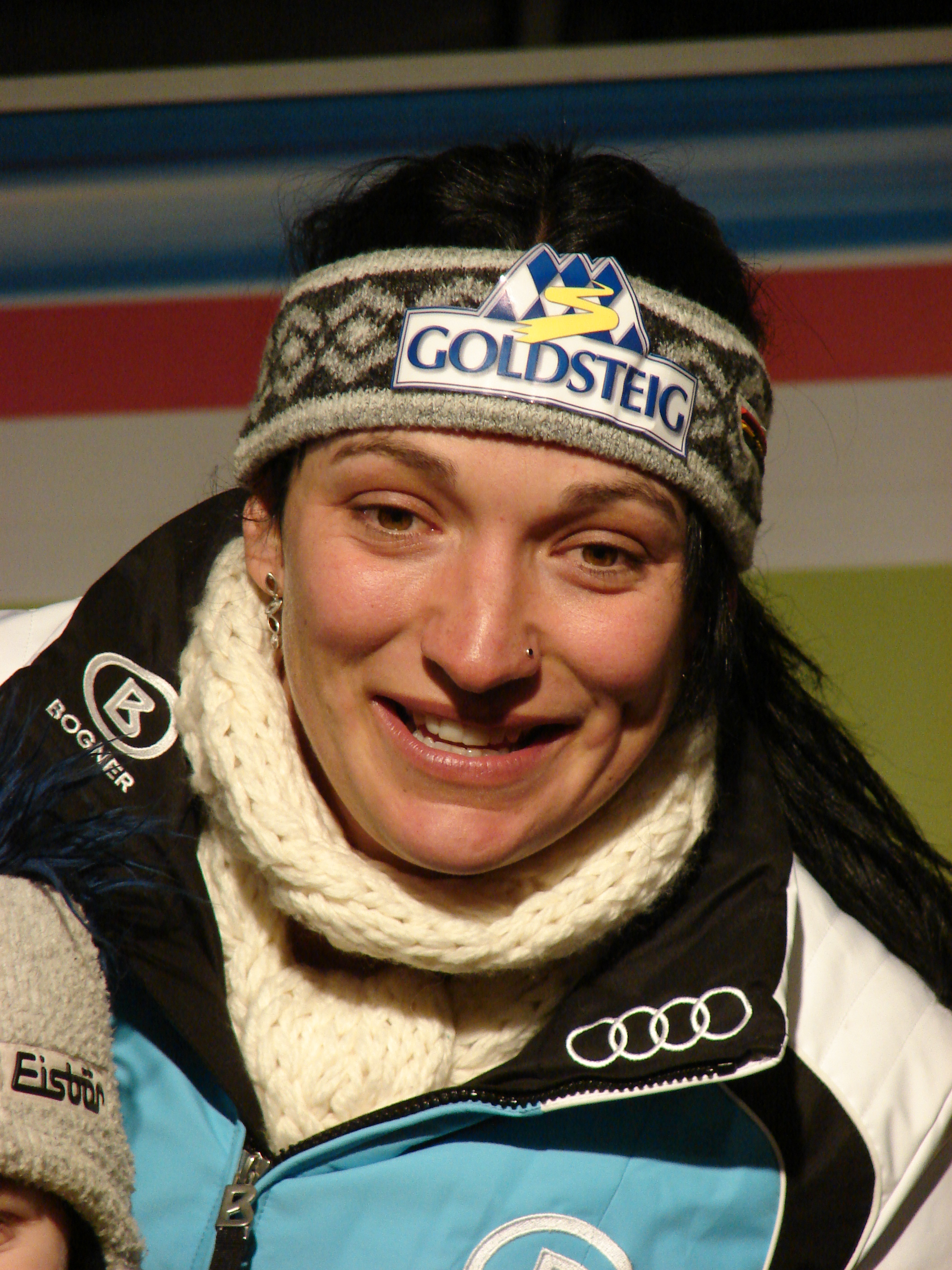
- Bergmann-Schmuderer in 2006

Personal information
- Full name: Monika Bergmann-Schmuderer
- Nationality: German
- Born: Monika Bergmann; 17 April 1978 (age 48) Lam, Bavaria, West Germany
- Years active: 1996-2009
- Height: 1.76 m (5 ft 9 in)
- Weight: 76 kg (168 lb)
Medal record
Women's alpine skiing
Representing Germany
World Championships
Gold medal – first place	2005 Bormio	Team Event

Monika Bergmann-Schmuderer (born 17 April 1978) is a retired German alpine skier and gold medal winner at FIS Alpine World Ski Championships.

== Career ==
She represented Germany at the 1998, 2002 and 2006 Winter Olympics. She won gold medal in team competition at FIS Alpine World Ski Championships 2005. In the World Cup she has 6 podiums.
