= Bad Hofgastein =

- Municipality
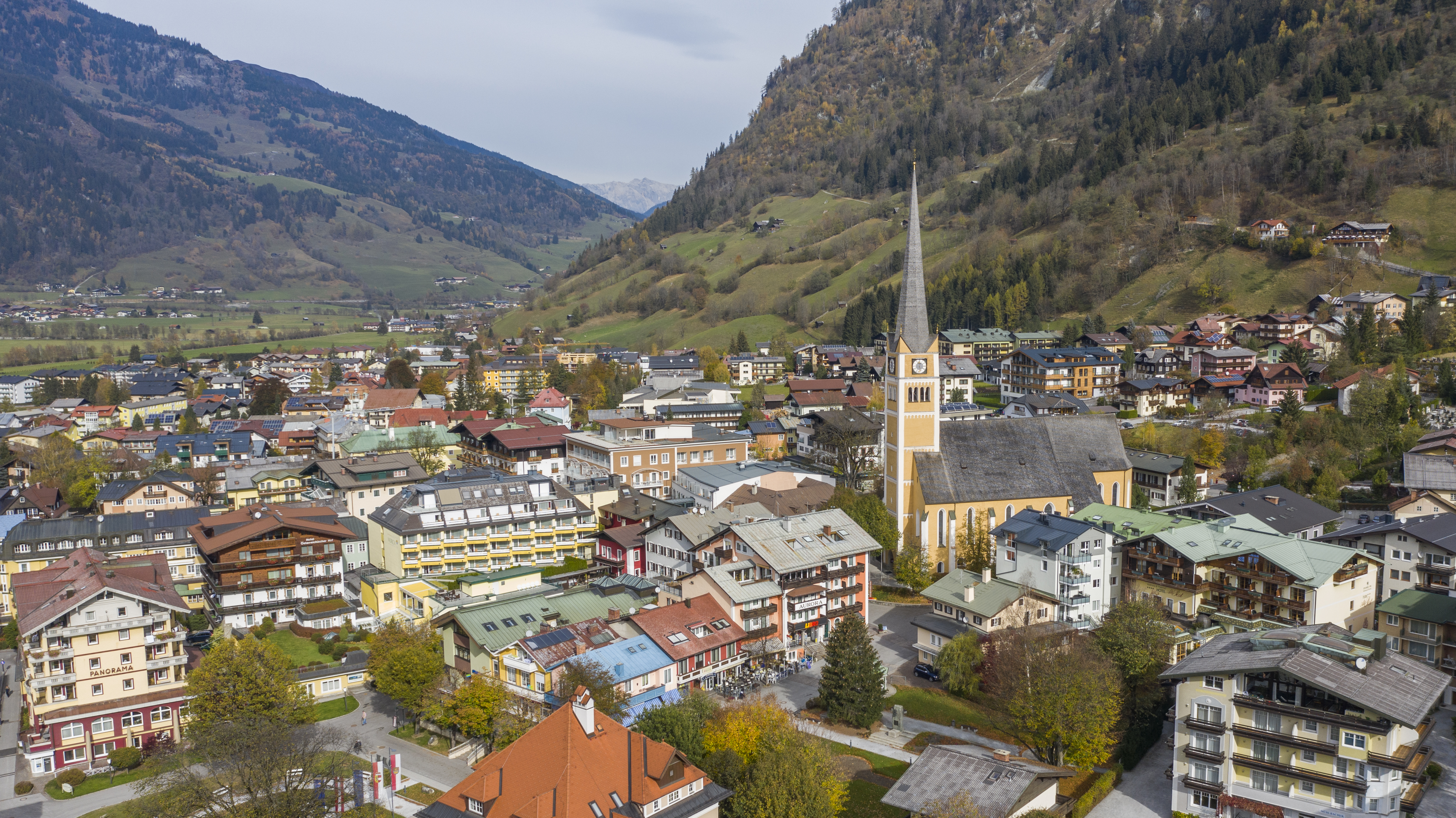
- Bad Hofgastein in 2018

- Coat of arms

- Location within Austria
- Coordinates: 47°10′0″N 13°12′0″E
- Country: Austria
- State: Salzburg
- District: St. Johann im Pongau

Government
  - Mayor: Markus Viehauser (ÖVP)

Area
  - Total: 103.72 km^{2} (40.05 sq mi)
- Elevation: 859 m (2,818 ft)

Population (2018-01-01)
  - Total: 6,914
  - Density: 66.66/km^{2} (172.6/sq mi)
- Time zone: UTC+1 (CET)
  - Summer (DST): UTC+2 (CEST)
- Postal code: 5630
- Area code: 06432
- Vehicle registration: JO
- Website: www.badhofgastein.at

Bad Hofgastein (Bavarian: Hofgoschdei) is a market town in the district of St. Johann im Pongau, in the Austrian state of Salzburg. The spa town is located in the Gastein Valley, a large ski resort belonging to the Ski Amadé network.

== Geography ==
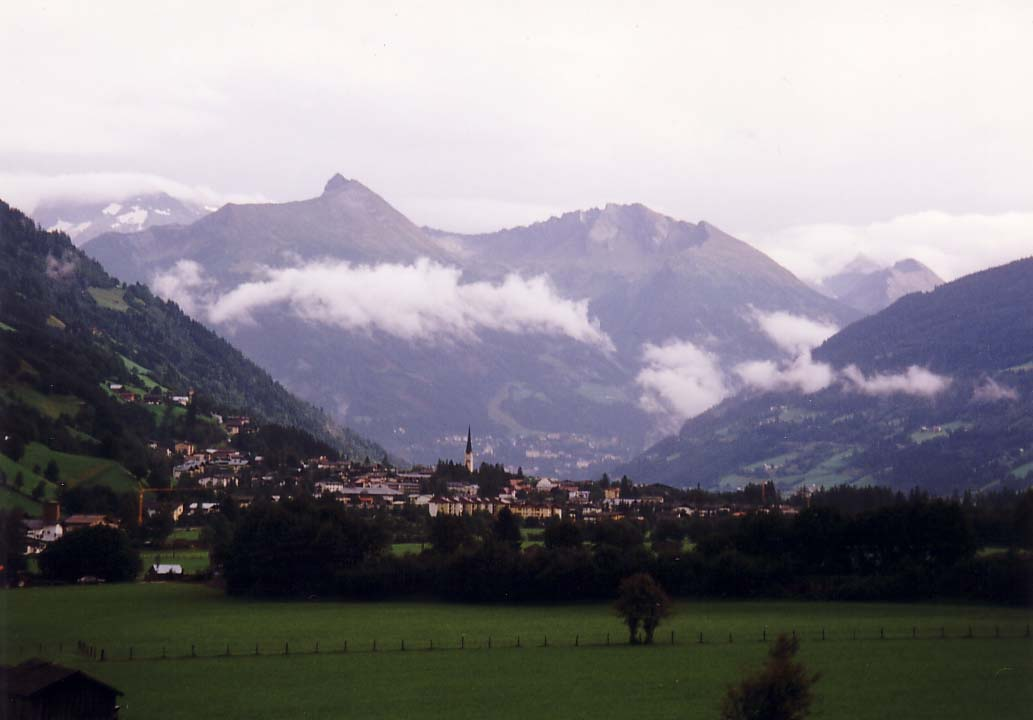
Bad Hofgastein, view to Ankogel massif

The Gastein valley is part of the High Tauern range of the Central Eastern Alps, it stretches from the broad Salzach valley at Lend southwards up to the Alpine divide and the border with Carinthia. Bad Hofgastein is located about halfway between Dorfgastein in the north and Bad Gastein in the south. It has access to the Tauern Railway line, running through the valley up to the Tauern Railway Tunnel.

The municipal area comprises the cadastral communities of Bad Hofgastein proper, Harbach, Heißingfelding, Vorderschneeberg, and Wieden.

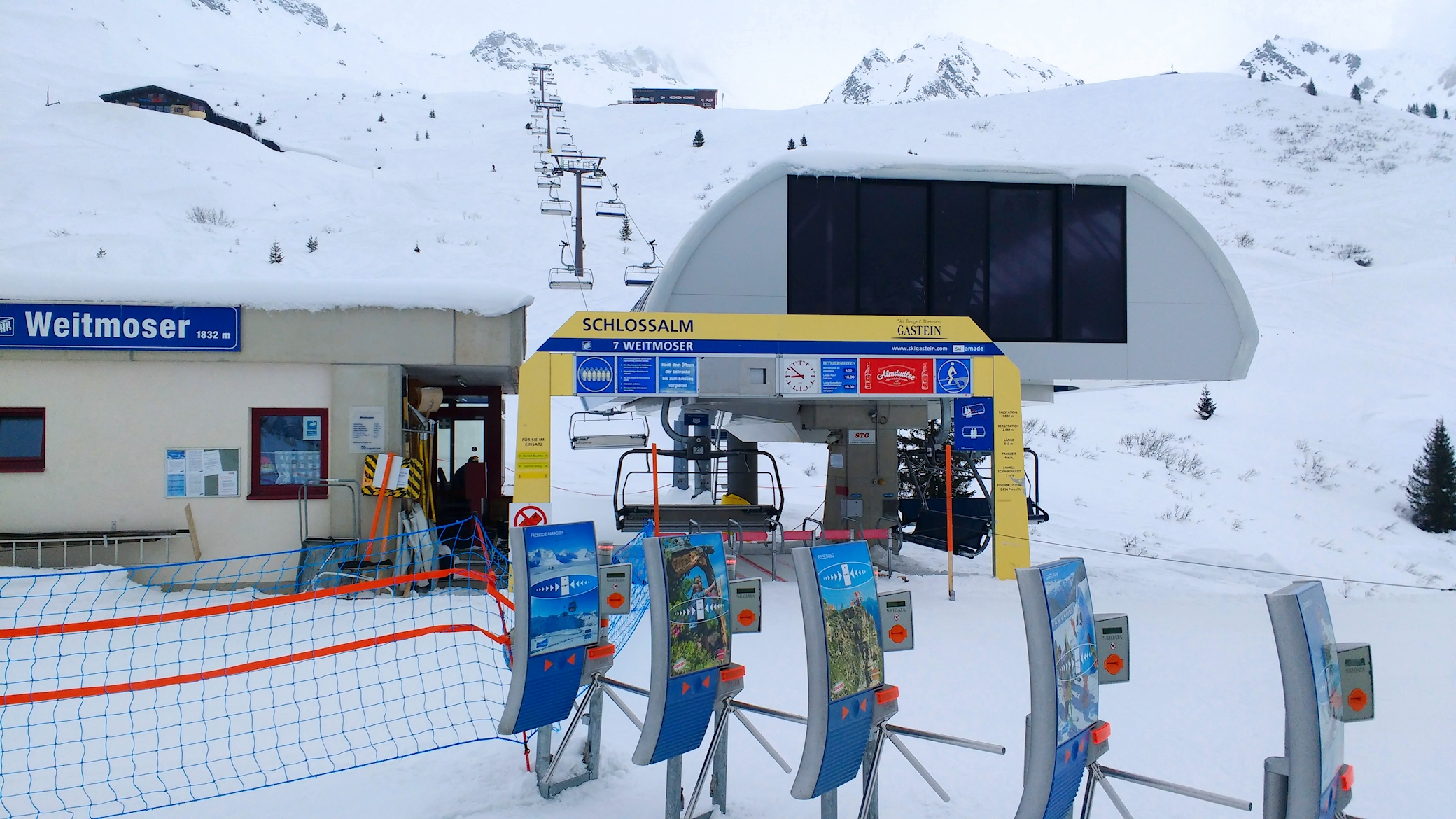
Schlossalm ski resort in March

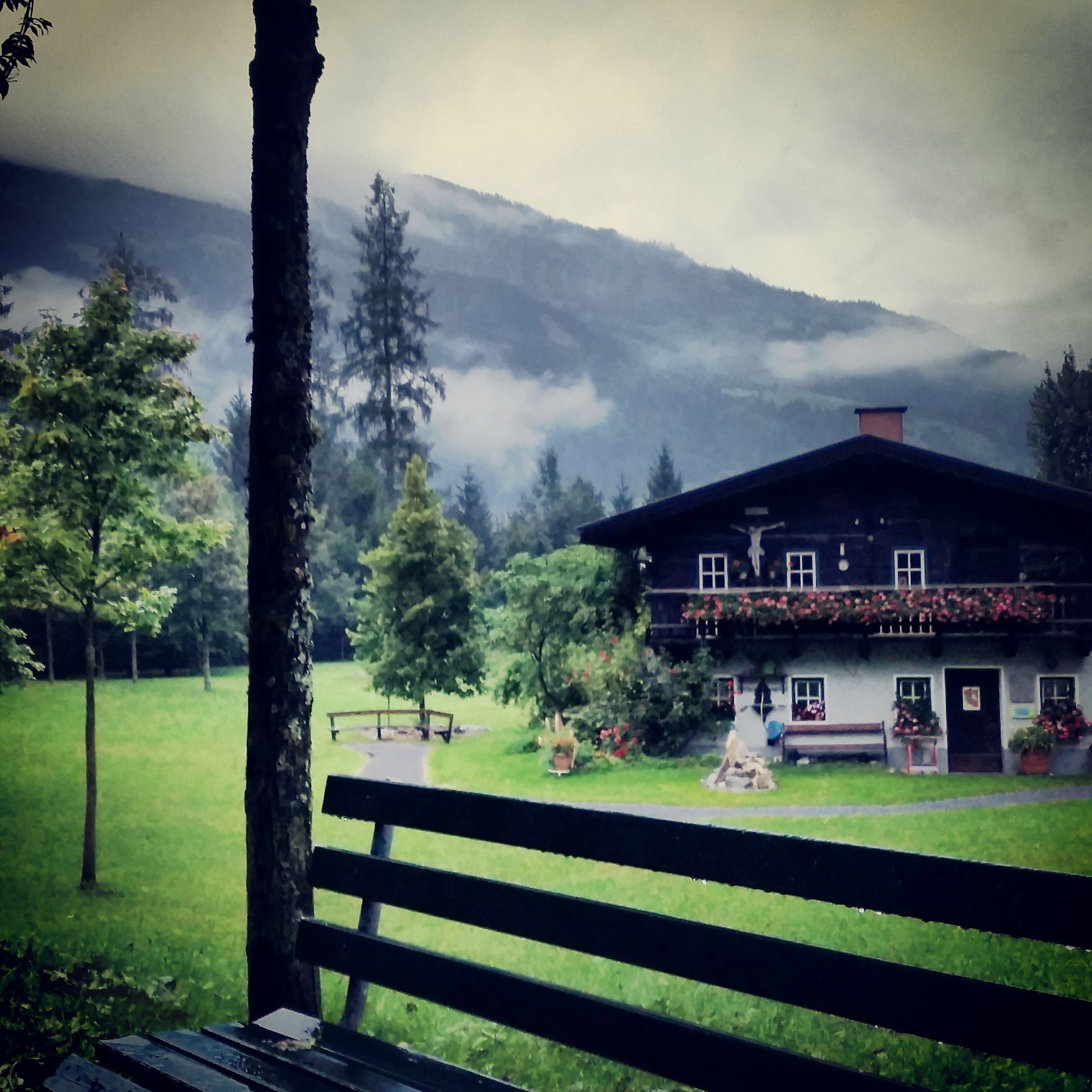
Bad Hofgastein nature view

== Tourism ==
Bad Hofgastein, together with Bad Gastein and Dorfgastein forms a Ski-region Gastein valley which is a part of a larger network Ski Amadé. The whole Gastein valley consists of 4 ski areas with a total over 200 kilometers of downhill slopes. Bad Hofgastein is located directly under the Schlossalm–Angertal–Stubnerkogel ski area.

Significant investments have been made in the Gastein valley's ski-system over the past few years. In the last three years alone €45 million have been spent on new lifts and piste improvements. The 2008 / 09 saw the opening of the Senderbahn lift (new 8-seater cabin lift from Angertal to Stubnerkogel). The 2009/10 season witnessed the opening of the new Stubnerkogelbahn (8-seater cabin lift in two sections from Bad Gastein to the Stubnerkogel summit) as well as the GipfelXpress (new 6-seater lift) in Dorfgastein.

In addition to the ongoing investments a new Schlossalmbahn lift has been in operation since 2018. The new lift connects downtown Bad Hofgastein (in direct vicinity of the Alpentherme) to the Schlossalm summit.

Bad Hofgastein has a large number of luxury hotels, the largest of which is the five star Grand Park Hotel. Additionally the 4 plus star Hotel Österreichischer Hof and Hotel Bismarck have recently undergone renovations / refurbishments.

The town’s main square is the focal point of the town, often the site of live music bands.

Bad Hofgastein is generally more frequented by Austrians, as well as a large number of Russian and Italian visitors, and has successfully maintained its image / standing next to the ups and downs of its neighbor Bad Gastein (which now once again is receiving vast investments aimed at restoring the former glory days of Archduke Ferdinand).

== Politics ==
As of 2014 local elections, the political parties represented in the Bad Hofgastein municipal council (Gemeinderat) are:

- Austrian People's Party (ÖVP): 10 seats
- Social Democratic Party of Austria (SPÖ): 9 seats
- Freedom Party of Austria (FPÖ): 3 seats
- Gemeinsam für Bad Hofgastein (GfBH): 3 seats

== Notable people ==
- Franz Hofer (1902–1975), Nazi Gauleiter
- Johann Grugger (born 1981), alpine skier
