= Johann Grugger =

Austrian alpine skier

Hans Grugger
Personal information
- Full name: Johann Grugger
- Born: 13 December 1981 (age 44) Bad Hofgastein, Austria
- Height: 5 ft 11 in (1.80 m)
- Website: grugger.at

Skiing career
- Sport: Alpine skiing
- Club: WSV Bad Hofgastein
- Disciplines: Downhill, Super-G
- World Cup debut: 29 November 2003 (age 21)

Olympics
- Teams: 1 – 2010
- Medals: 0

World Championships
- Teams: 2 – (2005, 2007)
- Medals: 0

World Cup
- Seasons: 6 – (2004-2011)
- Wins: 4 – (2 DH, 2 SG)
- Podiums: 9 – (7 DH, 2 SG)
- Overall titles: 0 – (10th – 2005)
- Discipline titles: 0 – (5th – 2005, downhill)

Johann "Hans" Grugger (born 13 December 1981 in Bad Hofgastein, Austria) is a former World Cup alpine ski racer, competing in the speed disciplines of downhill and super-G. He made his World Cup debut on 29 November 2003, in the downhill at Lake Louise, and finished seventh. He won his first World Cup race in Bormio, Italy on 29 December, 2004. Exactly one year later at Bormio, he crashed and had to drop out of the season due to the acquired injuries. However, he managed to come back to reach podium positions in 2007, including a victory in the super-G at Kvitfjell, Norway.

Grugger made his first Olympic team in 2010 in Vancouver and finished 22nd in the downhill at Whistler Creekside.

On 20 January 2011, Grugger crashed during a downhill training run at Kitzbühel and suffered a serious head injury. He was airlifted to Innsbruck and placed into an induced coma. Grugger suffered a severe head trauma by crashing head-first onto the ski piste after a long jump. On 18 March 2011 he left the rehab clinic two months earlier due to his fast recovery progress. He says he will be skiing again, but it is uncertain whether he will ever ski again competitively. Grugger's accident triggered discussions over safety in downhill skiing. In April 2012 at the age of 30, he announced that he would retire and not continue to pursue his comeback.

== World Cup podiums ==
Season	Date	Location	Race	Place
2004	14 Feb 2004	St. Anton, Austria	Downhill	3rd
2005	18 Dec 2004	Val Gardena, Italy	Downhill	3rd
2005	29 Dec 2004	Bormio, Italy	Downhill	1st
2005	8 Jan 2005	Chamonix, France	Downhill	1st
2006	2 Dec 2005	Beaver Creek, CO, US	Downhill	3rd
2006	10 Dec 2005	Val d'Isère, France	Downhill	3rd
2006	16 Dec 2005	Val Gardena, Italy	Super-G	1st
2007	23 Feb 2007	Garmisch, Germany	Downhill	2nd
2007	11 Mar 2007	Kvitfjell, Norway	Super-G	1st

=== Season standings ===
Season	Age	Overall	Slalom	Giant slalom	Super-G	Downhill	Combined
2004	22	28	—	—	33	14	—
2005	23	10	—	—	17	5	—
2006	24	31	—	—	12	14	—
2007	25	30	—	—	12	19	—
2008	26	injured					
2009	27	injured					
2010	28	50	—	—	44	11	—
2011	29	96	—	—	47	34	—
