= Andreas Ertl =

German former alpine skier

Personal information
- Born: 30 September 1975 (age 50) Lenggries, Bavaria, West Germany

Skiing career
- Sport: Alpine skiing
- Retired: 2006
- Disciplines: Technical events
- World Cup debut: 1995

World Championships
- Teams: 6
- Medals: 1 (1 gold)

World Cup
- Seasons: 8
Medal record
World Championships
Gold medal – first place	2005 Bormio	Team event

Andreas Ertl (born 30 September 1975) is a German alpine skiing coach and former alpine skier who won a gold medal with the national team at the team event at the 2005 Alpine World Ski Championships.

== Career ==
He participated at six editions of the Alpine Ski World Championships from 1996 to 2005.

== Biography ==
Andreas Ertl is the brother of the German alpine ski champion Martina Ertl.

== See also ==
- List of alpine skiing world champions
