= Bad Gastein =

- Municipality
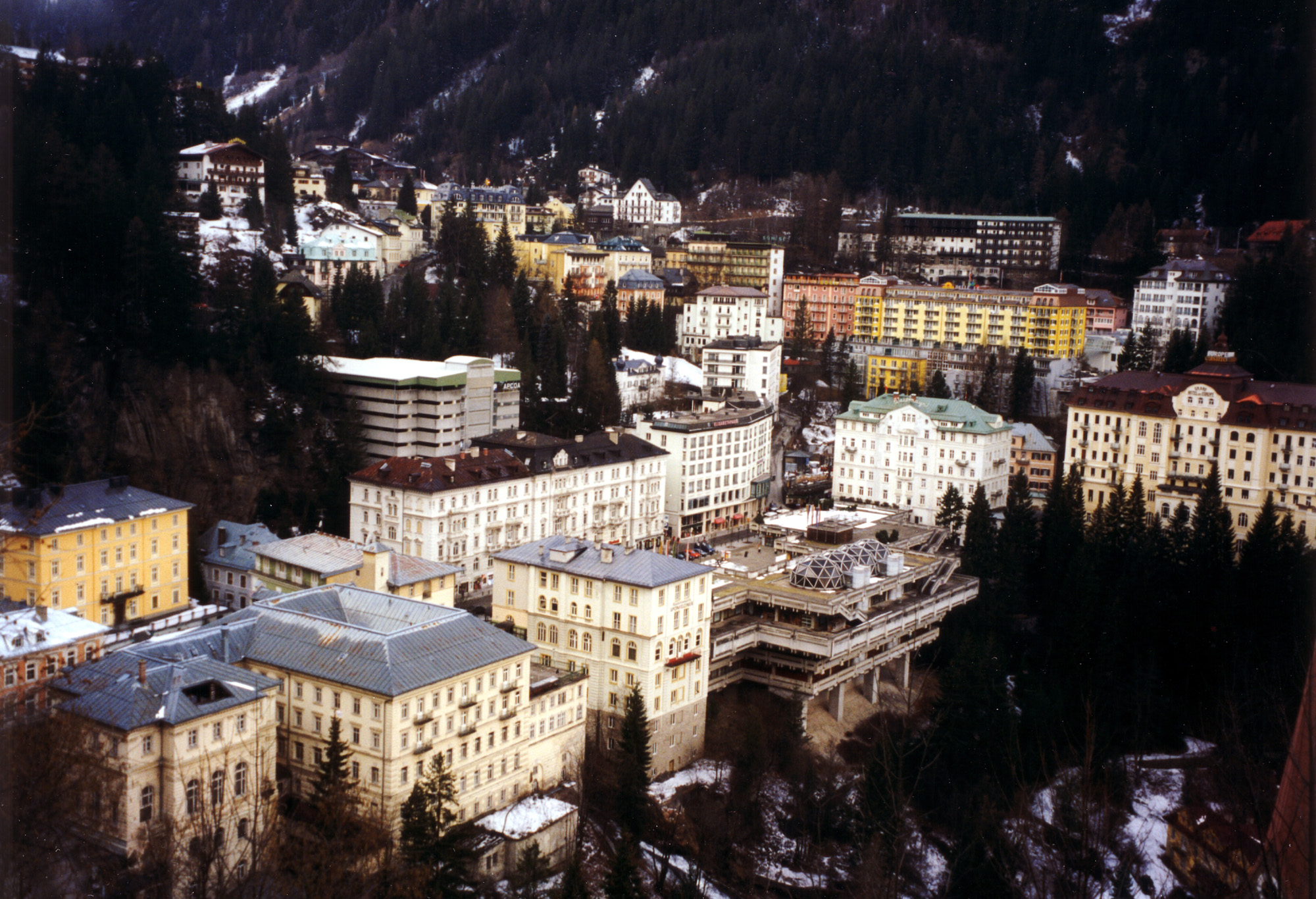
- Town centre

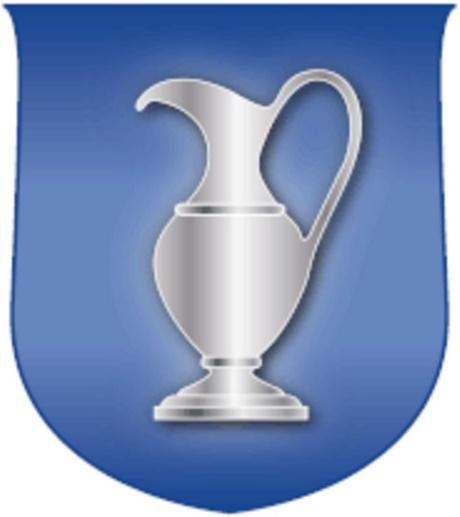
- Coat of arms

- Location within Salzburg State Location within Austria
- Coordinates: 47°6′0″N 13°1′0″E
- Country: Austria
- State: Salzburg
- District: St. Johann im Pongau

Government
  - Mayor: Thomas Lauterbach (No Party)

Area
  - Total: 170.6 km^{2} (65.9 sq mi)
- Elevation: 1,002 m (3,287 ft)

Population (2018-01-01)
  - Total: 3,980
  - Density: 23.3/km^{2} (60.4/sq mi)
- Time zone: UTC+1 (CET)
  - Summer (DST): UTC+2 (CEST)
- Postal code: 5640
- Area code: 06434
- Vehicle registration: JO
- Website: http://www.bad-gastein.at

Bad Gastein (German pronunciation: [baːt ɡasˈtaɪn]) is a spa town in the St. Johann im Pongau District of Austria. Picturesquely situated in a high valley of the Hohe Tauern mountain range, it is known for the Gastein waterfall and a variety of grand hotel buildings.

== Geography ==
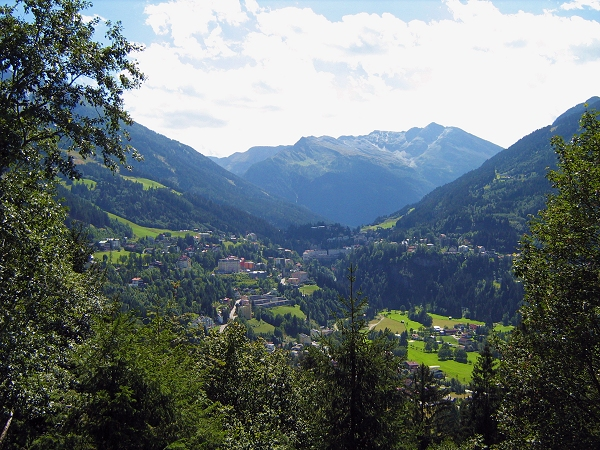
View of the upper Gastein valley

Bad Gastein is located in the historic Pongau District. It stretches along the upper Gastein Valley following the course of the Gastein Ache creek. The valley separates the Hohe Tauern Ankogel Group in the east from the Goldberg Group in the west.

The town centre is located at the Gastein waterfall, about 1,000 metres (3,300 ft) above sea level.

=== Transportation ===
The Gastein valley is accessible by the Tauern Railway, a major railroad running from Schwarzach im Pongau in the north across the Tauern Railway Tunnel to Spittal an der Drau, Carinthia in the south. Frequent EuroCity and InterCity trains going along this route connect Bad Gastein with many Austrian cities like Vienna, Linz, Salzburg and Graz.

=== Spa and therapy ===
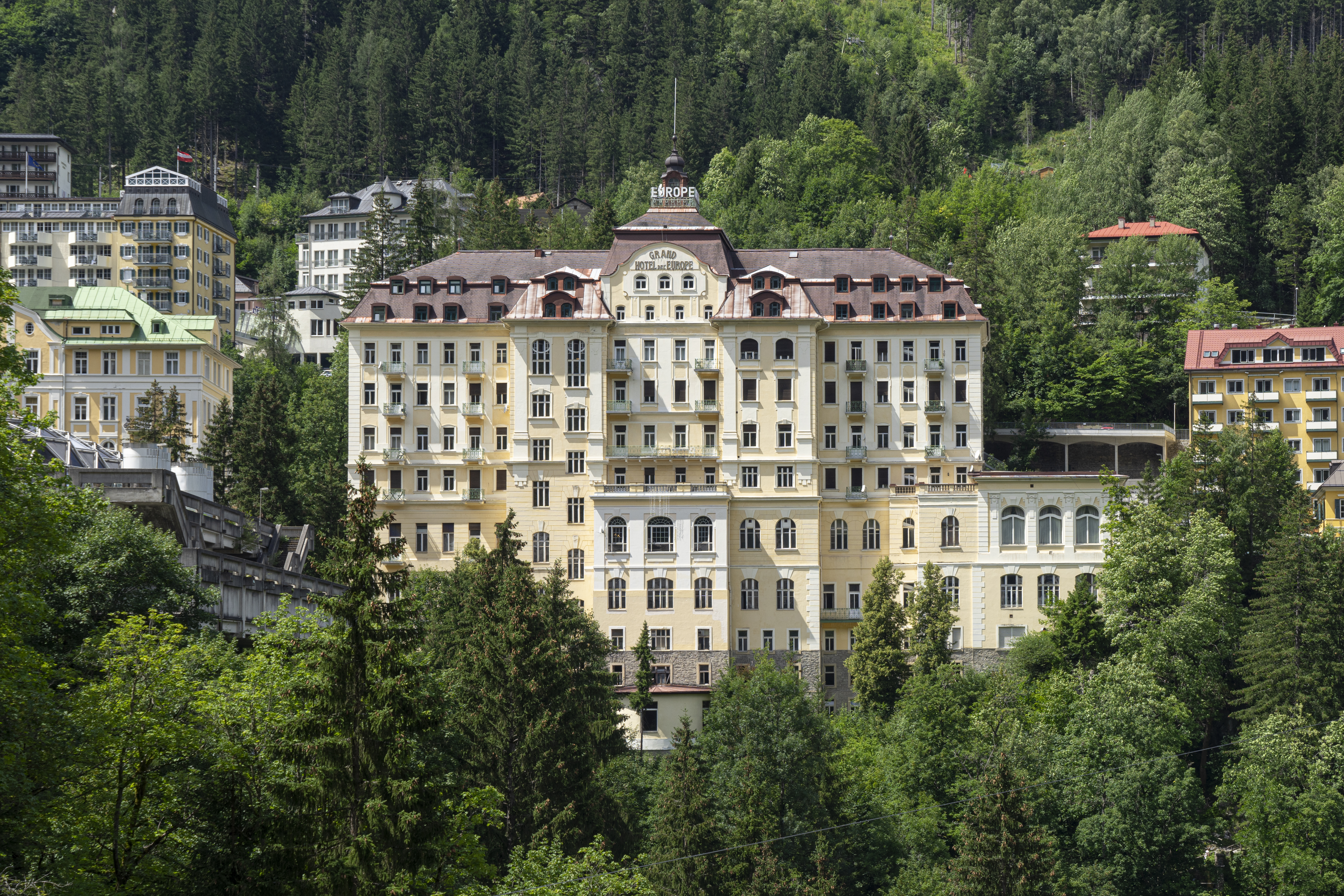
Grand Hotel del' Europe

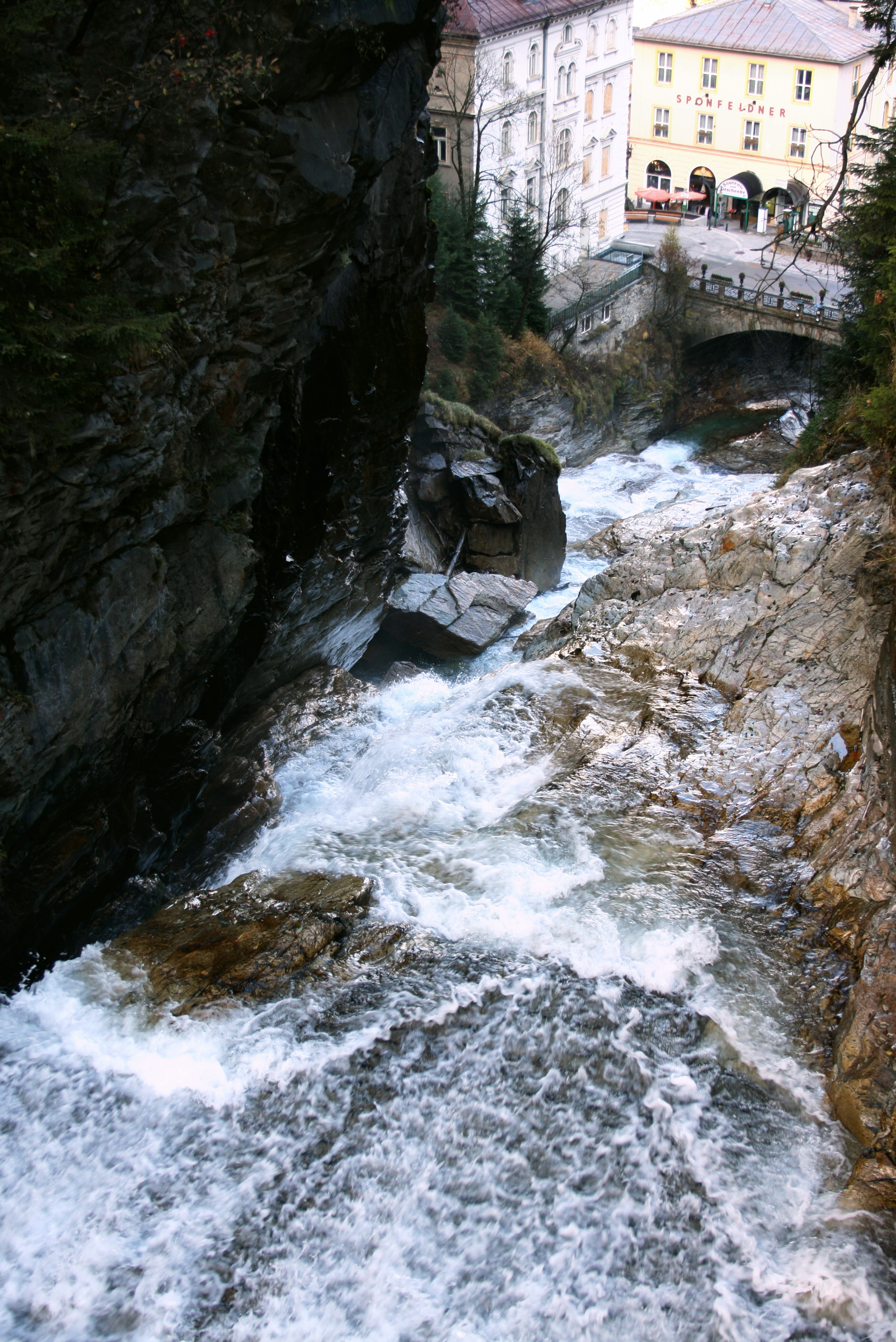
Gastein waterfall

The German word "Bad" means "spa", reflecting the town's history as a health resort. The local Heilstollen (literally 'healing tunnel') thermal spring water earned the town its early fame. Theophrastus Parcelsus (1493–1541) had studied the spring water to discover its secrets.

In the 16th century the Gastein Hot Springs, known as the Wildbad, started to become a popular spa destination. In the 18th century the Salzburg archbishop Hieronymus von Colloredo reignited the fashion for visiting the Gastein Hot Springs. He had a classicist palace built in Bad Gastein at which he resided during his summer spa stays. In 1807 the palace was restored as public health resort. This exclusive resort was promoted by Ferdinand III, Grand Duke of Tuscany. He had a coach service built between Salzburg and Bad Gastein. In 1807 Bad Gastein was visited by Francis II, Holy Roman Emperor, he was looking for ideas on how to improve his health in the imperial and royal bath. Ultimately the emperor joined a spa project in Bad Hofgastein that was financed by Ladislaus Pyrker. An English coffeehouse was built in 1850 in Bad Gastein.

Radon therapy began to be administered in Bad Gastein. Radon inhalation therapy at the Gasteiner Heilstollen began as a result of further investigation into the experiences of humans who worked in silver mining who noticed improvements in symptoms from various ailments.

The Grandhotel Gasteinerhof has residential outbuildings and modern urban design integrates the historic ensemble, which includes a spa with a glass corridor over a creek with pristine alpine water.

The Austrian spa of Bad Gastein has special trains for spa guests, who are driven deep into the cave of the Böckstein mountain. There guests can lie for several hours to breathe in radon gas. To accommodate spa guests, the tunnels originally dug for gold mining have been converted.

== History ==
The remote valley was settled by Bavarian peasants in the 9th century; field names in the highest-lying southern parts also denote a Carantanian (Slavic) colonization. Gastein is first mentioned as Gastuna in a 963 deed, when the area belonged to the German stem duchy of Bavaria. It was originally an alpine farming and gold mining area and the site of an ancient trade route crossing the main ridge of the Central Eastern Alps. In 1297 Otto III, Duke of Bavaria and his brother Stephen I, Duke of Bavaria, both highly indebted, sold it to the Archbishopric of Salzburg. Already about 1230, the minnesinger Neidhart von Reuental had referred to the hot springs in his Middle High German poem Die Graserin in der Gastein. The spas in Bad Gastein were visited by the House of Habsburg emperor Frederick III, Holy Roman Emperor. The Renaissance physician Paracelsus also visited Bad Gastein.

=== High society ===
The waters of Bad Gastein were fashionable. Notable guests of the past included Franz Grillparzer, Arthur Schopenhauer, Franz Schubert, Wilhelm von Humboldt, Franz Joseph I of Austria, Wilhelm I, German Emperor, Otto von Bismarck, Empress Elisabeth of Austria, and other members of the high society.

=== Mass tourism ===
At the end of the 19th century skiing was developed as tourism activity in the alps. Resorts such as Davos and St. Moritz catered to the wealthy health tourist, while popular mass tourism could only be sustained with the expansion of the railroads. Bad Gastein, Saint-Gervais-les-Bains, and Bad Ischl were established as health spas.

In the 1930s Bad Gastein was frequented by Jewish emigrants from Nazi Germany and German-occupied Europe. Those who could afford to visit their old home (alte Heimat) met in Bad Gastein. Returning from their travels they shared their experiences with other refugees in newsletters and presentations.

From the 1960s on the Bad Gastein lost some of its former reputation and many older hotels sat empty. Recently, Bad Gastein renovated its Felsentherme in 2014.

=== Places of interest ===
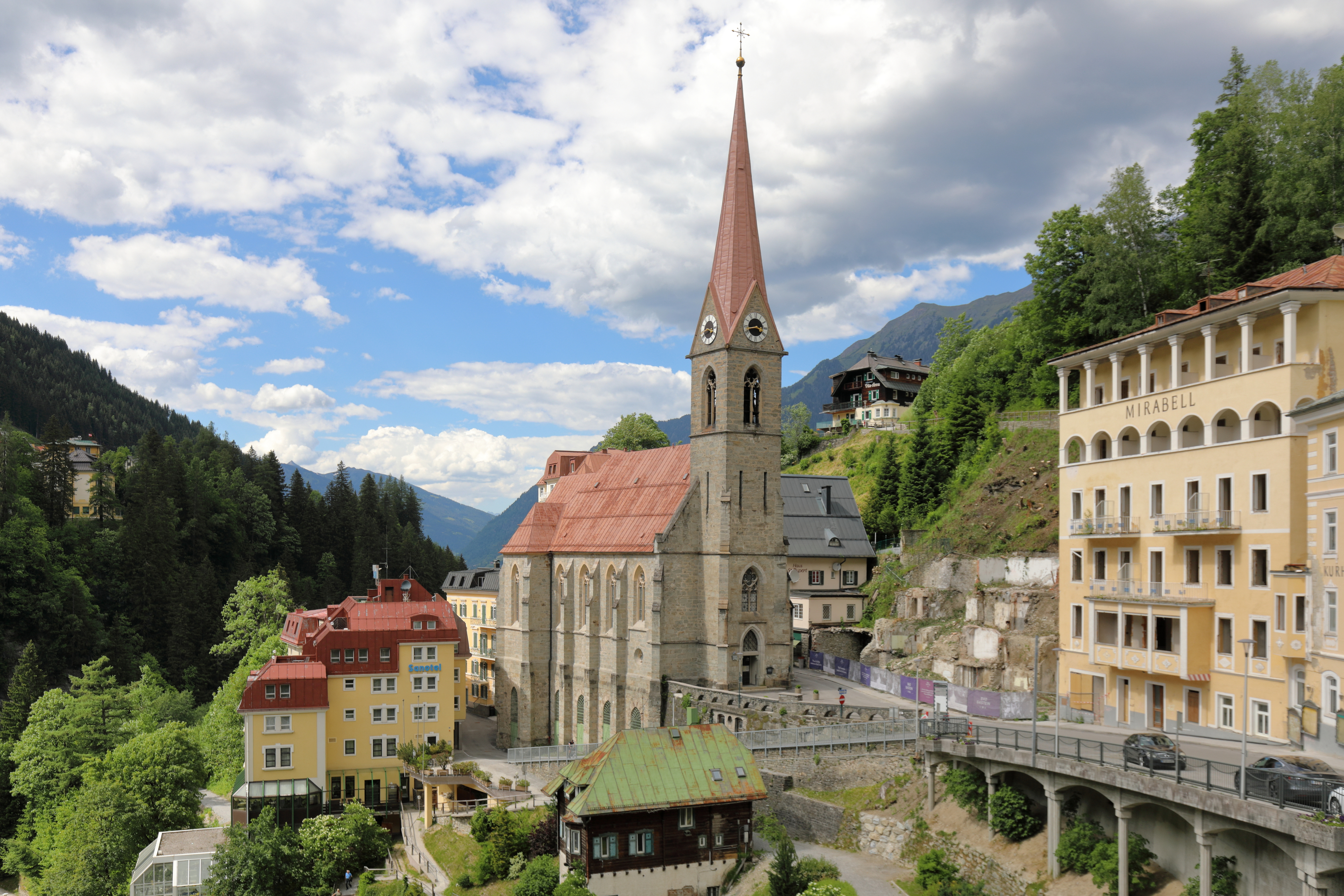
Catholic parish church

- Gletschermühlen
- Felsentherme
- Gasteiner Heilstollen
- Gasteiner Museum

== Climate ==
Bad Gastein has a humid continental climate (Dfb) bordering on a subarctic climate (Dfc) due to the town's high elevation. Summers are mild, sometimes warm with cool, refreshing nights. Winters are moderately cold and snowy, with annual snowfall averaging 345 cm (136 inches).

Climate data for Bad Gastein (1981–2010)
| Month | Jan | Feb | Mar | Apr | May | Jun | Jul | Aug | Sep | Oct | Nov | Dec | Year |
|---|---|---|---|---|---|---|---|---|---|---|---|---|---|
| Record high °C (°F) | 14.0 (57.2) | 16.4 (61.5) | 20.0 (68.0) | 23.2 (73.8) | 28.6 (83.5) | 31.4 (88.5) | 32.3 (90.1) | 31.3 (88.3) | 28.0 (82.4) | 25.8 (78.4) | 22.6 (72.7) | 16.0 (60.8) | 32.3 (90.1) |
| Mean daily maximum °C (°F) | 0.8 (33.4) | 3.1 (37.6) | 7.0 (44.6) | 11.3 (52.3) | 16.7 (62.1) | 19.3 (66.7) | 21.6 (70.9) | 20.9 (69.6) | 17.1 (62.8) | 13.0 (55.4) | 5.7 (42.3) | 1.2 (34.2) | 11.5 (52.7) |
| Daily mean °C (°F) | −3.8 (25.2) | −2.4 (27.7) | 1.3 (34.3) | 5.3 (41.5) | 10.2 (50.4) | 13.0 (55.4) | 14.9 (58.8) | 14.3 (57.7) | 10.7 (51.3) | 6.7 (44.1) | 1.1 (34.0) | −2.7 (27.1) | 5.7 (42.3) |
| Mean daily minimum °C (°F) | −7.2 (19.0) | −6.3 (20.7) | −2.8 (27.0) | 0.9 (33.6) | 5.2 (41.4) | 8.0 (46.4) | 10.0 (50.0) | 9.7 (49.5) | 6.4 (43.5) | 2.7 (36.9) | −2.0 (28.4) | −5.8 (21.6) | 1.6 (34.9) |
| Record low °C (°F) | −23.5 (−10.3) | −21.0 (−5.8) | −21.5 (−6.7) | −12.2 (10.0) | −5.2 (22.6) | 0.4 (32.7) | −0.3 (31.5) | 1.4 (34.5) | −3.4 (25.9) | −11.6 (11.1) | −16.5 (2.3) | −21.0 (−5.8) | −23.5 (−10.3) |
| Average precipitation mm (inches) | 51 (2.0) | 46 (1.8) | 69 (2.7) | 76 (3.0) | 110 (4.3) | 154 (6.1) | 174 (6.9) | 154 (6.1) | 116 (4.6) | 97 (3.8) | 86 (3.4) | 62 (2.4) | 1,196 (47.1) |
| Average snowfall cm (inches) | 58 (23) | 60 (24) | 62 (24) | 33 (13) | 4 (1.6) | 0 (0) | 0 (0) | 0 (0) | 1 (0.4) | 15 (5.9) | 42 (17) | 70 (28) | 345 (136) |
| Average relative humidity (%) (at 14:00) | 70.7 | 57.5 | 52.2 | 47.2 | 46.6 | 50.9 | 51.8 | 53.6 | 54.2 | 55.7 | 68.8 | 77.0 | 57.2 |
| Mean monthly sunshine hours | 52 | 89 | 110 | 123 | 159 | 153 | 176 | 155 | 126 | 114 | 58 | 30 | 1,344 |
Source: Central Institute for Meteorology and Geodynamics

Climate data for Bad Gastein (1971–2000)
| Month | Jan | Feb | Mar | Apr | May | Jun | Jul | Aug | Sep | Oct | Nov | Dec | Year |
|---|---|---|---|---|---|---|---|---|---|---|---|---|---|
| Record high °C (°F) | 14.5 (58.1) | 16.4 (61.5) | 20.0 (68.0) | 23.2 (73.8) | 28.5 (83.3) | 29.4 (84.9) | 32.3 (90.1) | 31.4 (88.5) | 28.2 (82.8) | 25.8 (78.4) | 19.5 (67.1) | 16.0 (60.8) | 32.3 (90.1) |
| Mean daily maximum °C (°F) | 1.4 (34.5) | 3.1 (37.6) | 7.0 (44.6) | 10.4 (50.7) | 16.0 (60.8) | 18.5 (65.3) | 20.7 (69.3) | 20.6 (69.1) | 17.1 (62.8) | 12.4 (54.3) | 5.3 (41.5) | 1.6 (34.9) | 11.2 (52.2) |
| Daily mean °C (°F) | −3.2 (26.2) | −2.1 (28.2) | 1.5 (34.7) | 4.7 (40.5) | 9.8 (49.6) | 12.4 (54.3) | 14.4 (57.9) | 14.1 (57.4) | 10.6 (51.1) | 6.4 (43.5) | 0.7 (33.3) | −2.5 (27.5) | 5.6 (42.1) |
| Mean daily minimum °C (°F) | −6.5 (20.3) | −5.9 (21.4) | −2.5 (27.5) | 0.5 (32.9) | 4.9 (40.8) | 7.6 (45.7) | 9.5 (49.1) | 9.5 (49.1) | 6.3 (43.3) | 2.5 (36.5) | −2.4 (27.7) | −5.5 (22.1) | 1.5 (34.7) |
| Record low °C (°F) | −23.5 (−10.3) | −21 (−6) | −19.5 (−3.1) | −10.7 (12.7) | −11 (12) | −3.3 (26.1) | −0.3 (31.5) | 1.5 (34.7) | −2 (28) | −11.6 (11.1) | −16.5 (2.3) | −19.8 (−3.6) | −23.5 (−10.3) |
| Average precipitation mm (inches) | 49.7 (1.96) | 44.6 (1.76) | 67.4 (2.65) | 80.6 (3.17) | 103.4 (4.07) | 153.7 (6.05) | 163.5 (6.44) | 147.1 (5.79) | 112.0 (4.41) | 90.5 (3.56) | 81.5 (3.21) | 60.2 (2.37) | 1,154.2 (45.44) |
| Average snowfall cm (inches) | 41.5 (16.3) | 44.0 (17.3) | 48.6 (19.1) | 24.1 (9.5) | 4.9 (1.9) | 0.0 (0.0) | 0.0 (0.0) | 0.0 (0.0) | 0.6 (0.2) | 10.9 (4.3) | 29.5 (11.6) | 53.0 (20.9) | 257.1 (101.2) |
| Average precipitation days (≥ 1.0 mm) | 7.7 | 8.4 | 10.9 | 11.6 | 13.5 | 16.1 | 16.3 | 14.6 | 11.2 | 9.5 | 9.7 | 9.4 | 138.9 |
| Average relative humidity (%) (at 14:00) | 67.6 | 56.9 | 50.7 | 47.4 | 46.1 | 50.4 | 51.3 | 52.3 | 52.9 | 55.0 | 67.0 | 73.6 | 55.9 |
| Mean monthly sunshine hours | 56.4 | 83.0 | 108.6 | 112.3 | 157.7 | 142.0 | 166.0 | 157.2 | 128.4 | 109.1 | 58.9 | 37.5 | 1,317.1 |
| Percentage possible sunshine | 44.6 | 47.2 | 46.8 | 40.6 | 46.5 | 39.1 | 48.8 | 52.8 | 52.8 | 52.1 | 40.5 | 43.1 | 46.2 |
Source: Central Institute for Meteorology and Geodynamics

== Sports ==
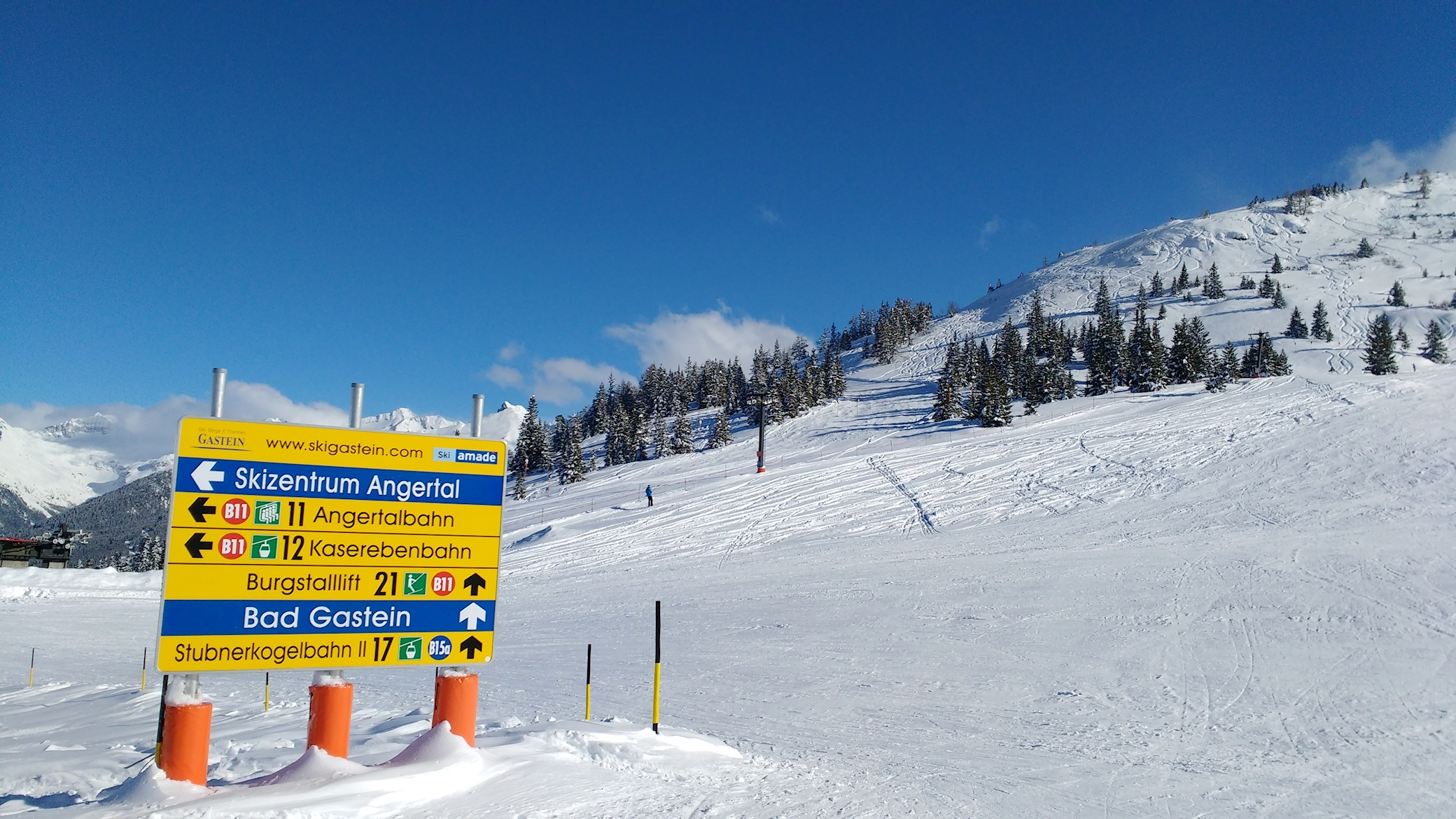
Ski slope on Stubnerkogel mountain

Bad Gastein is popular for winter sports. Bad Gastein hosted the 1958 World Championships in alpine skiing and regularly is a scene of the snowboarding and boardercross world cup. The Bad Gastein and Bad Hofgastein ski resort is part of the larger Ski Amadé network, with Gastein valley having 4 ski areas with over 200 kilometers of downhill slopes. Many establishments on the slopes offer warmth, food and strong drinks.

Since 2007, the town also annually hosts the Gastein Ladies tennis tournament, an International event on the WTA Tour, attracting top players like Julia Görges.

== Notable people ==
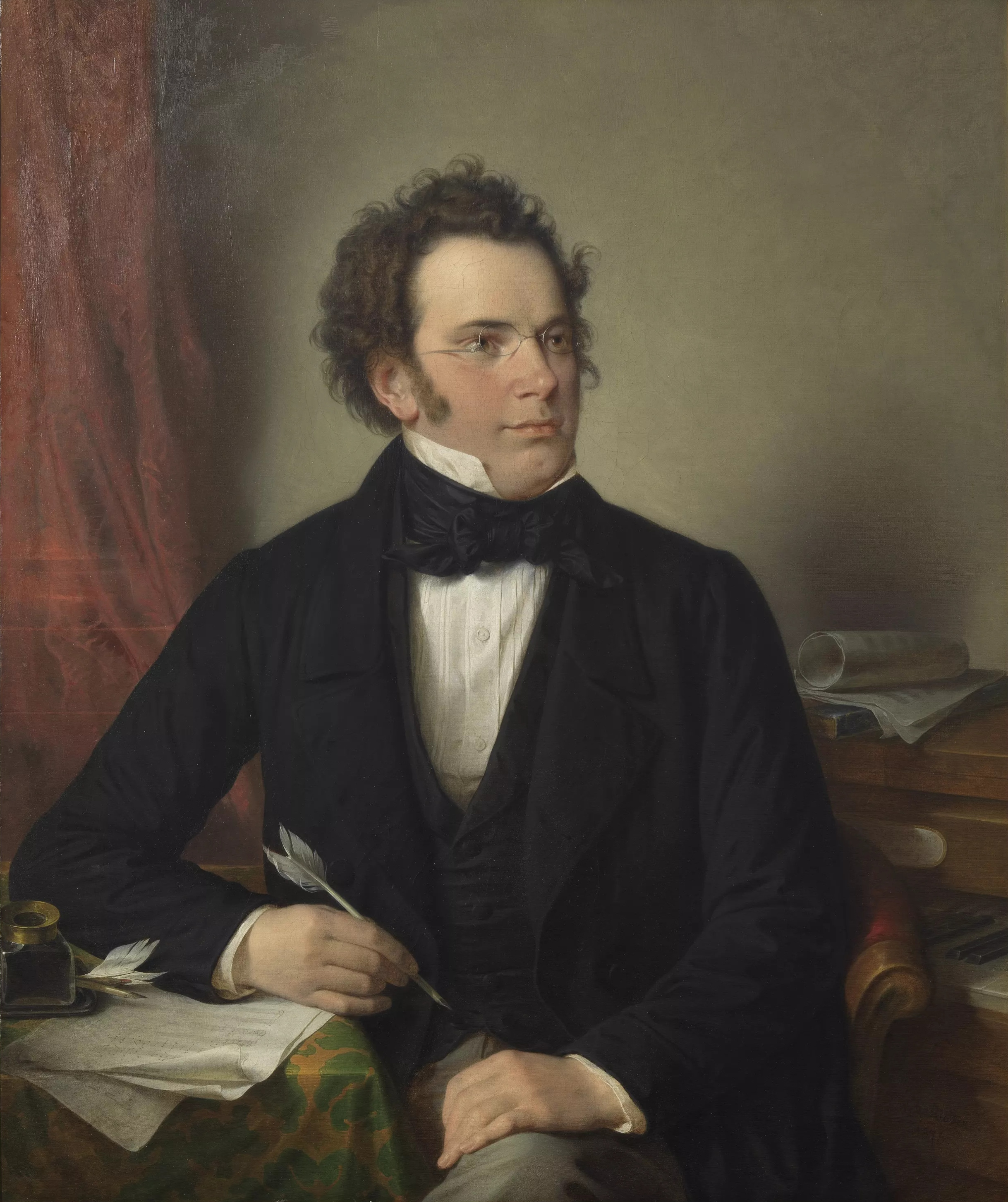
Franz Schubert

- Thea Hochleitner (1925–2012), alpine skier
- Hans Eder (1927–2008), Nordic skier
- Franz Xaver Franzmair (1901–1988) hotelier and builder, Freeman of Bad Gastein
- Hermann Greinwald (1927–1990) doctor and mountain rescue doctor
- Fritz Gruber (born 1940) local historian of Gastein alley and botanist
- Franz Schubert (1797–1828) composed after a holiday in Bad Gastein the Piano Sonata in D major, nicknamed "Gasteiner"
- Karl Straubinger (1855–1924) mayor (1882–1917), freeman of Bad Gasteins
- Georg Thomalla (1915–1999) German actor
- Erwin Wexberg (1889–1957) individual psychologian, doctor, student of Alfred Adler
- Eckart Witzigmann (born 1941) Austrian master cook, freeman of Bad Gastein
- Maria Zittrauer (1913–1997) lyrician, Trakl-Prize-winner 1952
- Fedor Ivanovich Shalyapin, singer, Feodor Chaliapin
