= Ambrosi Hoffmann =

Swiss alpine skier (born 1977)

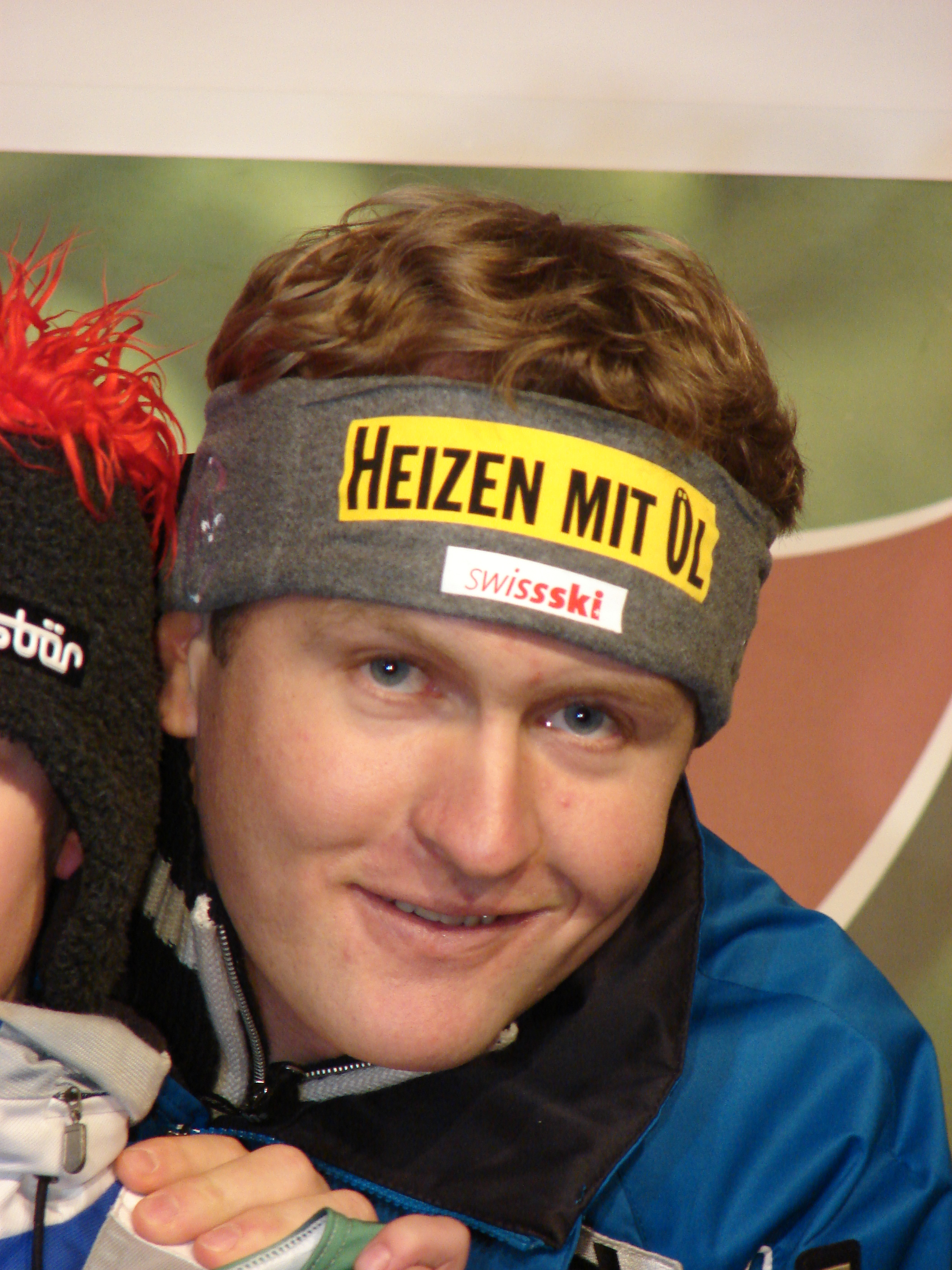
- Hoffmann in 2006

Personal information
- Born: 22 March 1977 (age 49) Davos, Switzerland
Medal record
Men's alpine skiing
Representing Switzerland
Olympic Games
Bronze medal – third place	2006 Turin	Super-G

Ambrosi Hoffmann (born 22 March 1977, in Davos) is a Swiss alpine skier. At the 2002 Winter Olympics, he finished 8th in downhill. He won a bronze medal in super-G at the 2006 Winter Olympics and placed 17th in the downhill event.
