= Stephan Görgl =

Austrian alpine skier

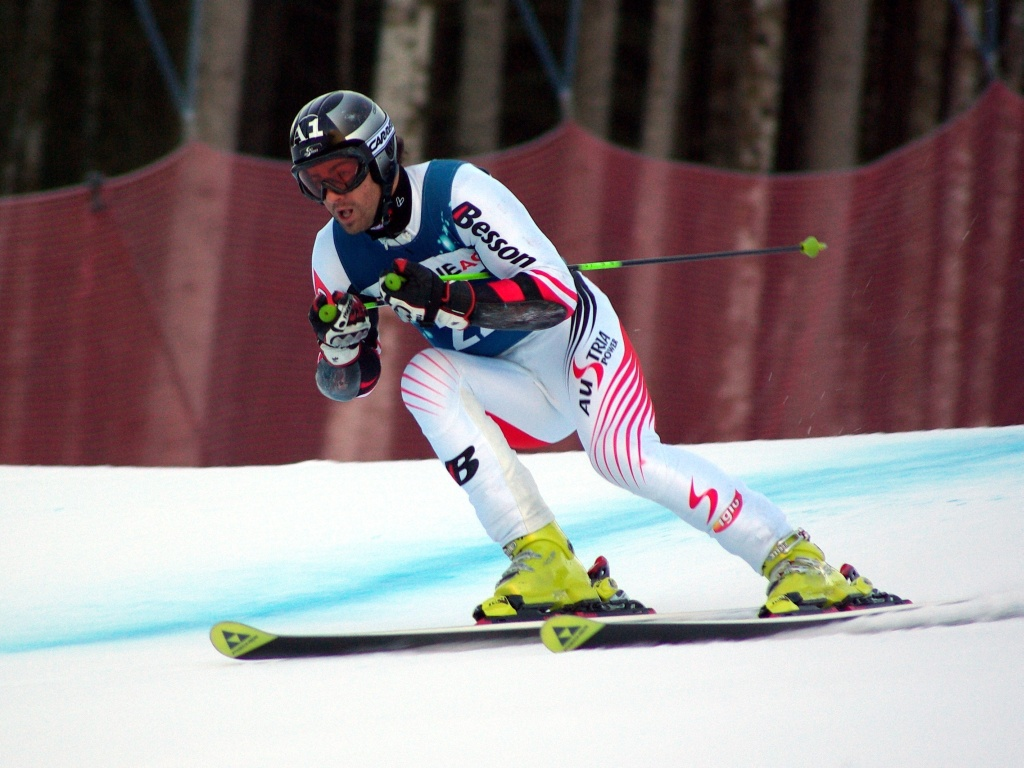

Personal information
- Born: 5 June 1978 (age 48) Bruck an der Mur, Austria
- Height: 1.77 m (5 ft 9 1/2 in)

Skiing career
- Sport: Alpine skiing
- Club: Kapfenberger SV
- Retired: 9 Dec 2012 (age 34)
- Disciplines: Giant slalom, super-G
- World Cup debut: 28 Jan 2001 (age 22)

World Cup
- Seasons: 12 - (2001–12)
- Wins: 2 - (1 GS, 1 SG)
- Podiums: 5 - (3 GS, 2 SG)
- Overall titles: 0 - (15th in 2005)
- Discipline titles: 0 - (7th in SG in 2005)

Stephan Görgl (born 5 June 1978 in Bruck an der Mur) is a former Austrian alpine skier, who competed in Giant slalom and Super G.

He competed in the giant slalom at the 2006 Winter Olympics, but failed to finish his second run. He is the son of Anton and Traudl Hecher Görgl and the brother of Elisabeth Görgl who is also an alpine skier.

== World Cup results ==
=== Podiums ===
- 2 wins – (1 Giant slalom, 1 Super G)
- 5 podiums – (3 GS, 2 SG)

Season	Date	Location	Discipline	Place
2005	02 Dec 2004	(United States) Beaver Creek, USA	Super G	1st
2005	11 Mar 2005	Lenzerheide, Switzerland	Super G	3rd
2005	12 Mar 2005	Lenzerheide, Switzerland	Giant slalom	1st
2006	07 Jan 2006	Adelboden, Switzerland	Giant slalom	3rd
2009	21 Jan 2009	Sestriere, Italy	Giant slalom	2nd

=== Standings ===
Season	Age	Overall	Slalom	Giant slalom	Super-G	Downhill	Combined
2001	22	137	—	—	57	—	—
2002	23	59	—	37	16	—	—
2003	24	118	—	51	51	—	—
2004	25	46	—	26	20	—	—
2005	26	15	—	9	7	—	—
2006	27	30	—	14	11	—	—
2007	28	125	—	38	—	—	—
2008	29	46	—	17	26	—	—
2009	30	42	—	16	20	—	—
2010	31	119	—	37	—	—	—
2011	32	71	—	32	22	—	—
