= Pista Gianni A. Agnelli =

Ski slope in Kronplatz, Italy

- Interactive map of Pista Gianni A. Agnelli
- Location within Northern Italy
- 44°57′00″N 6°53′00″E
- Location: Sestriere, Italy.
- Mountain: Monte Alpette
- Opened: 1990

Giant slalom
- Start: 2,400 m (7,874 ft) (AA)
- Finish: 2,046 m (6,713 ft)
- Vertical drop: 354 m (1,161 ft)
- Max incline: 28.4 degrees (54%)
- Avg incline: 17.8 degrees (32%)
- Min incline: 5.4 degrees (6%)

Pista Gianni A. Agnelli is the World Cup technical ski course on Monte Alpette mountain in Sestriere, Italy.

The course which was named after Giovanni Alberto Agnelli, an Italian businessman and member of the Agnelli family, an Italian industrial dynasty associated with Fiat S.p.A.; debuted in World Cup in 1990.

Both slalom and combined were held on this course at World Championships (1997) and Olympics (2006).

== The course ==
=== Sections ===
- Sises Steep
- Flat Alpette
- Diagonale
- Coaches Corner
- F1 Steep

== Olympics ==
=== Men's events ===
Event	Type	Date	Gold	Silver	Bronze
2006	KB	14 February 2006	(United States) Ted Ligety	(France) Jean-Baptiste Grange	(Italy) Giorgio Rocca
2006	SL	26 February 2006	(Austria) Benjamin Raich	(Austria) Reinfried Herbst	(Austria) Rainer Schönfelder

The men's combined downhill was held at Kandahar Banchetta course.

=== Women's events ===
Event	Type	Date	Gold	Silver	Bronze
2006	KB	17 February 2006	(Austria) Marlies Schild	(Croatia) Janica Kostelić	(Austria) Kathrin Zettel
2006	SL	22 February 2006	(Sweden) Anja Pärson	(Austria) Nicole Hosp	(Austria) Marlies Schild

The women's combined downhill was held at San Sicario course.

== World Championships ==
=== Men's events ===
Event	Type	Date	Gold	Silver	Bronze
1997	KB	6 February 1997	(Austria) Mario Reiter	(Norway) Kjetil André Aamodt	(Switzerland) Bruno Kernen
1997	SL	15 February 1997	(Norway) Tom Stiansen	(France) Sébastien Amiez	(Italy) Alberto Tomba

=== Women's events ===
Event	Type	Date	Gold	Silver	Bronze
1997	SL	5 February 1997	(Italy) Deborah Compagnoni	(Italy) Lara Magoni	(Switzerland) Karin Roten
1997	KB	15 February 1997	(Italy) Morena Gallizio	(Switzerland) Marlies Oester	(Germany) Hilde Gerg

Both The women's and men's combined downhill were held at Kandahar Banchetta course.

== World Cup ==
=== Men ===
No.	Type	Season	Date	Winner	Second	Third
702	SL	1990/91	11 December 1990	(Italy) Alberto Tomba	(Norway) Ole Kristian Furuseth	(Austria) Rudolf Nierlich
732	SL	1991/92	10 December 1991	(Italy) Alberto Tomba	(Norway) Finn Christian Jagge	(Norway) Ole Kristian Furuseth
761	SL	1992/93	29 November 1992	(Italy) Fabrizio Tescari	(Austria) Michael Tritscher	(Germany) Armin Bittner (Austria) Hubert Strolz
800	SL	1993/94	14 December 1993	(Italy) Alberto Tomba	(Austria) Thomas Stangassinger	(Norway) Ole Kristian Furuseth
832	SL	1994/95	12 December 1994	(Italy) Alberto Tomba	(Sweden) Thomas Fogdö	(Austria) Michael Tritscher
887	SL	1995/96	27 January 1996	(Austria) Mario Reiter	(Austria) Thomas Sykora	(Austria) Thomas Stangassinger
941	SL	1997/98	15 December 1997	(Norway) Finn Christian Jagge	(Austria) Thomas Sykora	(Norway) Hans Petter Buraas
977	SL	1998/99	14 December 1998	(Norway) Finn Christian Jagge	(Austria) Thomas Stangassinger	(Slovenia) Jure Košir
1054	SL	2000/01	11 December 2000	(Norway) Hans Petter Buraas	(Austria) Kilian Albrecht	(France) Pierrick Bourgeat
1122	KO	2002/03	16 December 2002	(Croatia) Ivica Kostelić	(Italy) Giorgio Rocca	(Norway) Truls Ove Karlsen
1188	SL	2003/04	14 March 2004	(Finland) Kalle Palander	(Austria) Rainer Schönfelder	(Austria) Manfred Pranger
1198	SL	2004/05	13 December 2004	(United States) Bode Miller	(Switzerland) Silvan Zurbriggen	(Finland) Kalle Palander

=== Women ===
No.	Type	Season	Date	Winner	Second	Third
778	SL	1994/95	18 December 1994	(Switzerland) Vreni Schneider	(Sweden) Pernilla Wiberg	(France) Béatrice Filliol
824	SL	1995/96	26 January 1996	(Switzerland) Sonja Nef	(Switzerland) Marlies Oester	(Sweden) Pernilla Wiberg
946	SL	1999/00	12 December 1999	(Croatia) Janica Kostelić	(Sweden) Anja Pärson	(France) Christel Pascal
971	SL	1999/00	10 March 2000	(United States) Kristina Koznick	(France) Christel Pascal	(Slovenia) Špela Pretnar
987	SL	2000/01	10 December 2000	(Croatia) Janica Kostelić	(United States) Sarah Schleper	(Norway) Trine Bakke
991	SL	2000/01	20 December 2000	(Croatia) Janica Kostelić	(Norway) Trine Bakke	(United States) Kristina Koznick
1017	SL	2001/02	9 December 2001	(Sweden) Anja Pärson	(Finland) Tanja Poutiainen	(Switzerland) Sonja Nef
1055	KO	2002/03	15 December 2002	(Sweden) Anja Pärson	(Finland) Tanja Poutiainen	(Austria) Nicole Hosp
1111	SL	2003/04	13 March 2004	(Austria) Marlies Schild	(United States) Sarah Schleper	(Finland) Tanja Poutiainen
1534	GS	2016/17	10 December 2016	(France) Tessa Worley	(Italy) Sofia Goggia	(Switzerland) Lara Gut
1535	SL	2016/17	11 December 2016	(United States) Mikaela Shiffrin	(Slovakia) Veronika Zuzulová	(Switzerland) Wendy Holdener
1653	GS	2019/20	18 January 2020	(Italy) Federica Brignone (Slovakia) Petra Vlhová		(United States) Mikaela Shiffrin
1654	PG	2019/20	19 January 2020	(France) Clara Direz	(Austria) Elisa Mörzinger	(Italy) Marta Bassino
1742	GS	2022/23	10 December 2022	(Italy) Marta Bassino	(Sweden) Sara Hector	(Slovakia) Petra Vlhová
1743	SL	2022/23	11 December 2022	(Switzerland) Wendy Holdener	(United States) Mikaela Shiffrin	(Slovakia) Petra Vlhová
1833	GS	2024/25	21 February 2025	(Italy) Federica Brignone	(New Zealand) Alice Robinson	(Norway) Thea Louise Stjernesund
1834	GS	2024/25	22 February 2025	(Italy) Federica Brignone	(Switzerland) Lara Gut-Behrami	(New Zealand) Alice Robinson
1835	SL	2024/25	23 February 2025	(United States) Mikaela Shiffrin (Note: Mikaela Shiffrin's 100th victory in World Cup history)	(Croatia) Zrinka Ljutić	(United States) Paula Moltzan

Not in original calendar. It replaced Tremblant (2025).
