= Miranova proga A =

Ski course in Slovenia

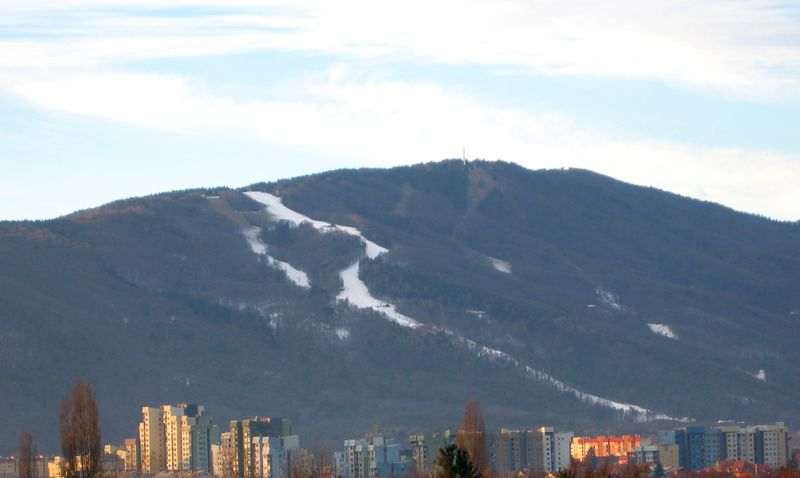
- Full slope in snow (right sleeve from top to valley)
- Interactive map of Miranova proga A
- Location within Slovenia
- 46°31′56″N 15°36′10″E
- Location: Maribor, Slovenia
- Mountain: Pohorje
- Opened: January 1978
- Member: Club5+
- Competition: Golden Fox

Giant slalom
- Start: 740 m (2,428 ft) (AA)
- Finish: 340 m (1,115 ft)
- Vertical drop: 400 m (1,312 ft)
- Most Wins (W): (Sweden) Anja Pärson (2x) (Germany) Martina Ertl (2x) (Slovenia) Tina Maze (2x) (Switzerland) Sonja Nef (2x)

Slalom
- Start: 540 m (1,772 ft) (AA)
- Finish: 340 m (1,115 ft)
- Vertical drop: 200 m (656 ft)
- Most Wins (W): (Switzerland) Vreni Schneider (6x)

Miranova proga A is a women's World Cup technical ski course in Slovenia, on Pohorje mountain in Radvanje District, Maribor hostin Golden Fox (Zlata lisica) competition since 1978.

Part of Mariborsko Pohorje Ski Resort, the largest ski course in Slovenia, the slope is divided on upper part (GS start – Trikotna jasa) and lower part (SL start – Snow stadium finish).

Not counting ski slopes in Scandinavia with very cold winters, this is the course with lowest finish elevation on the World Cup circuit, at 325 metres (1,066 ft) above sea level.

== World Cup ==
=== History ===
In 1978, competition moved from the upper "Old F.I.S" ("stara F.I.S"), incredibly steep and even too demanding slope at the top station next to Bellevue Hotel to the new slope in valley, direct into the city.

The Old slope was narrow with difficult access for a live audience, which had difficulty watching and standing on dangerous and icy steep inclines, with a small finish area.

For the next five years (1979, 1980, 1981, 1982, 1983) competition was again, and for the last time, moved to the upper old FIS slope, due to lack of snow and warm weather.

In 1984, competition returned on this slope permanently, often with replacements in Kranjska Gora (1988, 1991, 2007, 2012, 2014, 2018, 2020, 2021) due to snow.

In 1987, the "Snow Stadium" (finish area) was bulldozed and completely redone; the terrain was lifted and flattened for easier access and more comfortable standing.

In 1994, Urška Hrovat won Saturday's replaced slalom in front of home crowd of 30,000, with a total attendance of 50,000 over three days. Real Fox fur trophy was awarded for the last time, due to animal rights controversy.

In 1995, Vreni Schneider won the record 6th Golden Fox trophy award and record 7th individual win. Slalom as first WC event ever, was split in two days due to rain, with 1st run on Sunday and 2nd on Monday.

In 1996, two giants slaloms (first replaced Lake Louise) and slalom visited 40,000 people in three days. Saturday's GS set women's World Cup TV ratings record with 17.6 million viewers in total.

In 1997, a new Arena hotel opened in the finish area and Urška Hrovat took Golden Fox Trophy. Juan Antonio Samaranch, the president of International Olympic Committee was among the spectators.

For the first time, the OC put the Golden Fox on the internet, something new for the World Cup. In two days, the Golden Fox page had over 1500 contacts from all over the world.

In 1998, Golden Fox was cancelled – the only time in its history without being replaced (in Kranjska Gora or any other venue).

In 1999, Slovenia hosted speed disciplines for the first and only time in history of World Cup, which should be on schedule on New Year's Day, but rescheduled on the next day.

In 2005, Tina Maze won first giant slalom in history of this competition, with a total attendance of 20,000 for two days. In 2009, Maze won her second giant slalom in Maribor, with an attendance of 15,000 over two days. By the analysis of INFRONT media group, Golden Fox had over 200 million TV viewers in total, the most watched World Cup broadcast of the season, both men and women, beating even Kitzbühel. 187 million in footages (69 stations and 77 hours). Live broadcast was seen by a total of 21 million people (6 million have seen giant slalom and 15 million slalom).

In 2013, Maze took her third win here by taking slalom in front of 19,000 people. She also won the Golden Fox trophy as the third Slovenian after Mateja Svet and Urška Hrovat. And over 40,000 people attended in two days.

In 2021, they decided to prepare and build additional slope on higher altitude on crossing, combined and widened with existing upper part of the slope, due to unstable weather conditions and lack of snow in the valley. The new reserve start will be at the top of famous ex Habakuk lift, continued by right side bypassing Luka cabin, then going lower to Špelca log, then joining existing upper GS slope, widening lower part cutting the forest, ending with finish area at Trikotna jasa (traditional slalom start).

=== Golden Fox ===
All but yellow labeled counted for traditional Zlata Lisica (Golden Fox) fur trophy, the best combined time of SL and GS.

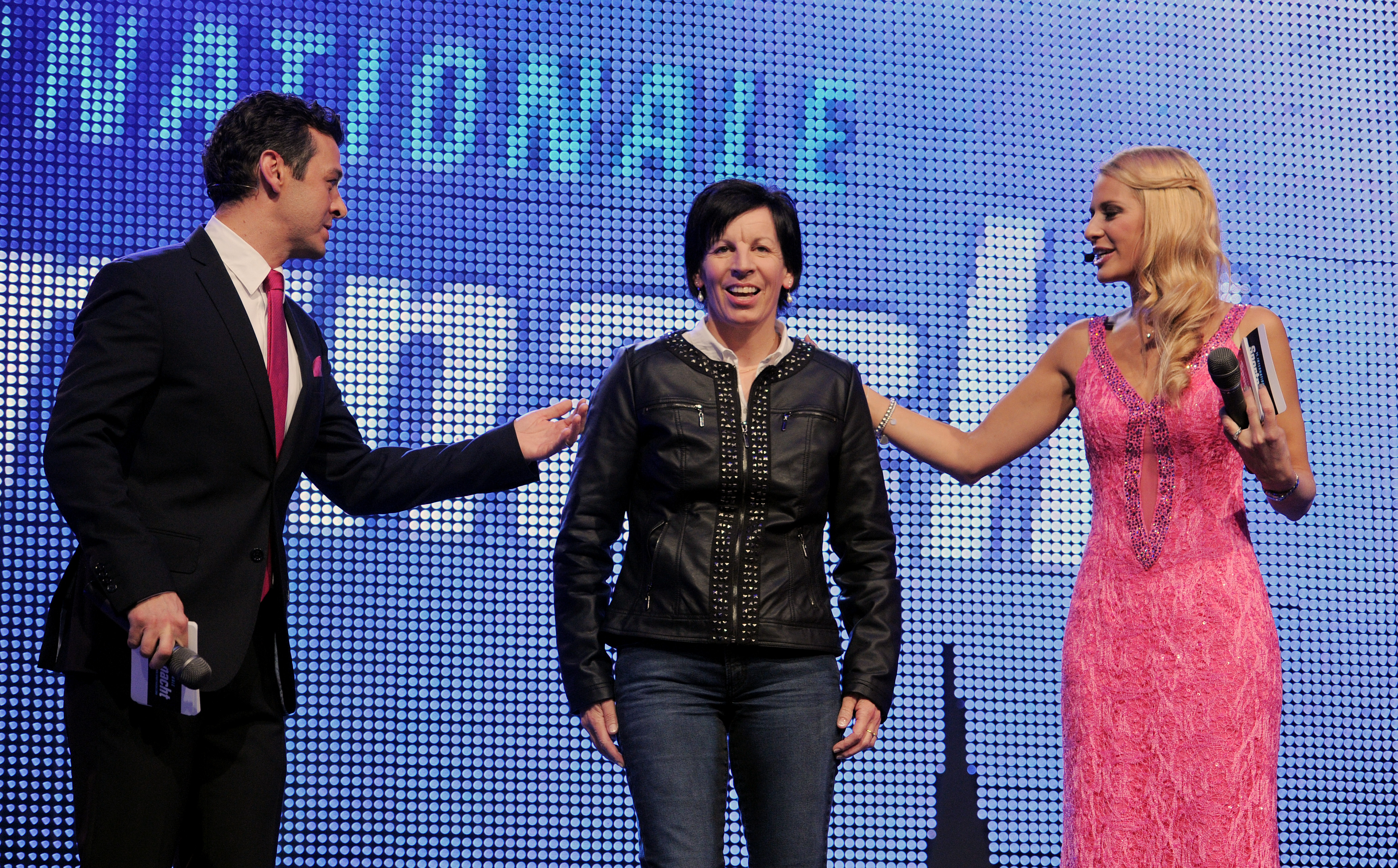
Vreni Schneider (SUI) won record 6 Golden Fox real fur trophies in total; and record 7 World Cup wins in total

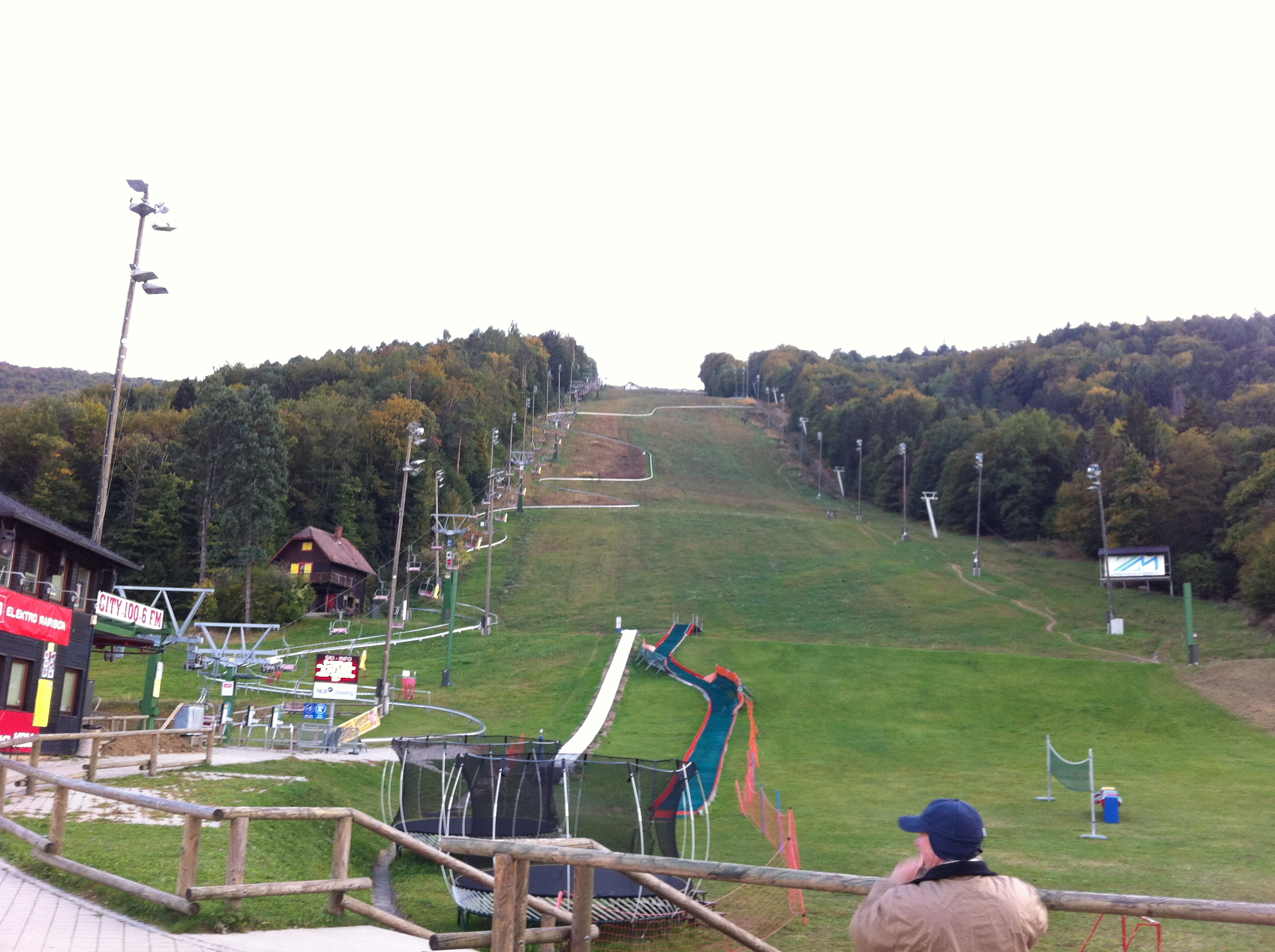
Slalom slope (lower part in summer)

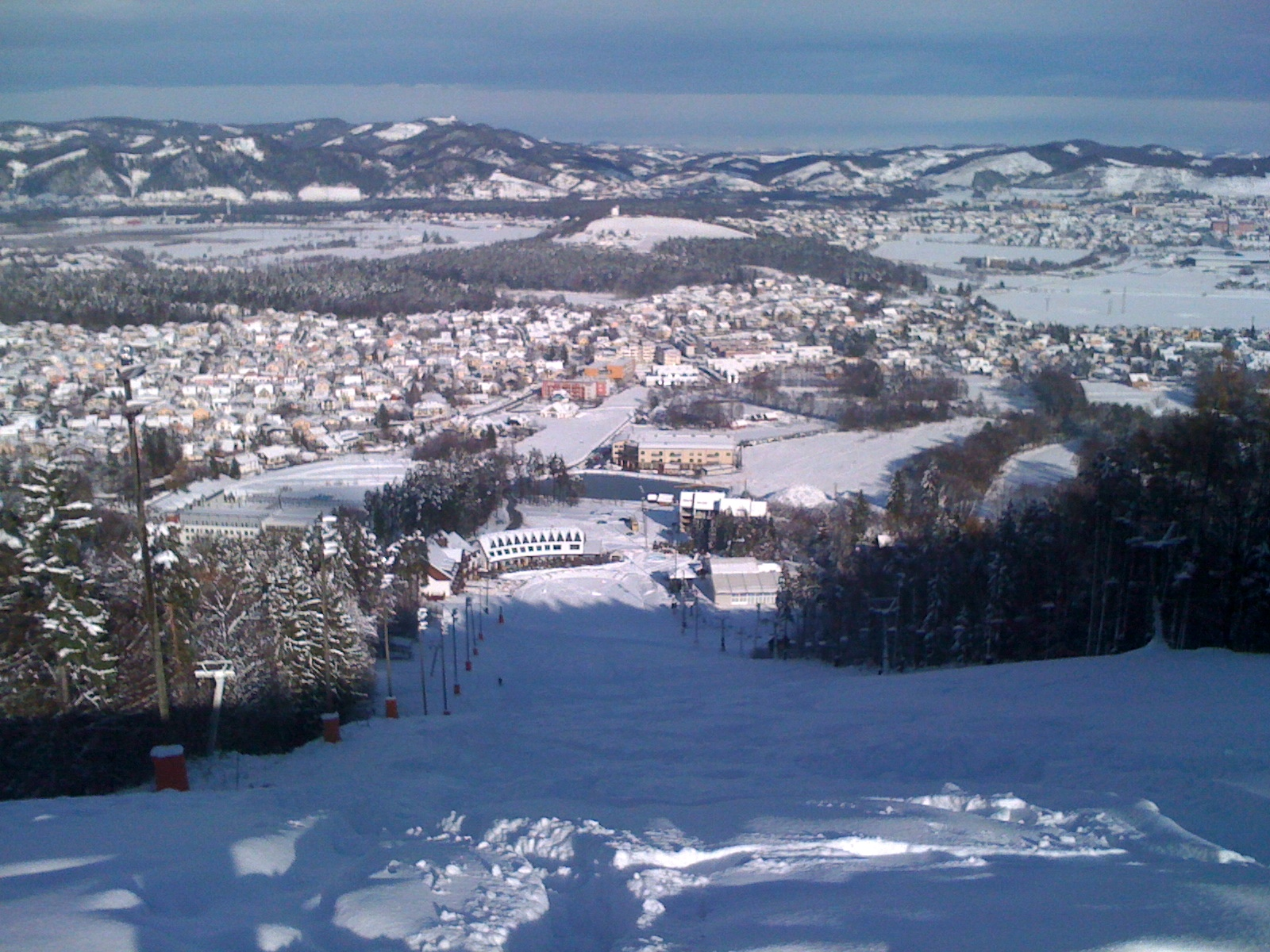
Slalom slope (lower part in winter)

No.	Type	Season	Winner	Second	Third	Golden Fox	Note
262	SL	1977/78	(Liechtenstein) Hanni Wenzel	(West Germany) Maria Epple	(Austria) Lea Sölkner	(Liechtenstein) Hanni Wenzel	premiere; replaced "Old F.I.S." slope
	SL	1978/79	lack of snow and high temperatures; moved to the upper "Old F.I.S." slope under Bellevue Hotel (Top gondola station)				
	SL	1979/80	lack of snow and high temperatures; moved to the upper "Old F.I.S." slope under Bellevue Hotel (Top gondola station)				
	GS	1980/81	lack of snow and high temperatures; moved to the upper "Old F.I.S." slope under Bellevue Hotel (Top gondola station)				
	SL	1980/81	lack of snow and high temperatures; moved to the upper "Old F.I.S." slope under Bellevue Hotel (Top gondola station)				
	SL	1981/82	lack of snow and high temperatures; moved to the upper "Old F.I.S." slope under Bellevue Hotel (Top gondola station)				
	SL	1982/83	lack of snow and high temperatures; moved to the upper "Old F.I.S." slope under Bellevue Hotel (Top gondola station)				
421	SL	1983/84	(Switzerland) Erika Hess	(United States) Tamara McKinney	(United States) Christin Cooper	(Switzerland) Erika Hess	permanent move to "Miranova proga A"
464	GS	1984/85	(Switzerland) Michela Figini	(Switzerland) Vreni Schneider	(Spain) Blanca Fernández Ochoa	(Switzerland) Erika Hess	
465	SL	1984/85	(United States) Tamara McKinney	(Czechoslovakia) Olga Charvátová	(Switzerland) Brigitte Gadient	(Switzerland) Erika Hess	
494	SL	1985/86	(Austria) Roswitha Steiner	(Switzerland) Erika Hess	(Austria) Ida Ladstätter	(Switzerland) Vreni Schneider	
495	GS	1985/86	(Switzerland) Vreni Schneider	(Switzerland) Michela Figini	(West Germany) Marina Kiehl	(Switzerland) Vreni Schneider	
496	KB	1985/86	(Switzerland) Michela Figini	(Switzerland) Maria Walliser	(West Germany) Marina Kiehl	this was not Golden Fox race	GS combined with Val d'Isère (DH)
	GS	1986/87	not held due to rain				
536	SL	1986/87	(Sweden) Camilla Nilsson	(Switzerland) Vreni Schneider	(Switzerland) Corinne Schmidhauser	(Sweden) Camilla Nilsson	
	GS	1987/88	lack of snow and high temperatures; replaced in Kranjska Gora				
	SL	1987/88	lack of snow and high temperatures; replaced in Kranjska Gora				
	GS	1988/89	lack of snow				
592	SL	1988/89	(Switzerland) Vreni Schneider	(Austria) Monika Maierhofer	(United States) Tamara McKinney	(Switzerland) Vreni Schneider	
629	GS	1989/90	(Socialist Federal Republic of Yugoslavia) Mateja Svet	(Austria) Anita Wachter	(Switzerland) Maria Walliser	(Socialist Federal Republic of Yugoslavia) Mateja Svet	
630	SL	1989/90	(Switzerland) Vreni Schneider	(Austria) Ida Ladstätter	(France) Patricia Chauvet	(Socialist Federal Republic of Yugoslavia) Mateja Svet	
	GS	1990/91	lack of snow and high temperatures; replaced in Kranjska Gora				
	SL	1990/91	lack of snow and high temperatures; replaced in Kranjska Gora				
	GS	1991/92	lack of snow; replaced in Piancavallo on 20 January 1992				
687	SL	1991/92	(Switzerland) Vreni Schneider	(Italy) Deborah Compagnoni	(Sweden) Pernilla Wiberg	(Switzerland) Vreni Schneider	
712	GS	1992/93	(France) Carole Merle	(Austria) Anita Wachter	(Switzerland) Vreni Schneider	(Switzerland) Vreni Schneider	
713	SL	1992/93	(Switzerland) Vreni Schneider	(New Zealand) Annelise Coberger	(Italy) Deborah Compagnoni	(Switzerland) Vreni Schneider	
755	GS	1993/94	(Austria) Ulrike Maier	(Switzerland) Vreni Schneider	(Germany) Katja Seizinger	(Switzerland) Vreni Schneider (GS + SL 2)	Golden Fox (GS combined with SL 2)
756	SL	1993/94	(Slovenia) Urška Hrovat	(Switzerland) Vreni Schneider	(Norway) Marianne Kjørstad	this was not Golden Fox race	SL 1 replaced the event in Germany (it did not count for Golden Fox)
757	SL	1993/94	(Switzerland) Vreni Schneider	(Sweden) Pernilla Wiberg	(Slovenia) Urška Hrovat	(Switzerland) Vreni Schneider (SL 2 + GS)	Golden Fox (SL 2 combined with GS)
791	GS	1994/95	(Germany) Martina Ertl	(Slovenia) Špela Pretnar	(Italy) Deborah Compagnoni	(Switzerland) Vreni Schneider	
792	SL	1994/95	(Switzerland) Vreni Schneider	(Slovenia) Katja Koren	(Norway) Trude Gimle	(Switzerland) Vreni Schneider	1st run (26 January); 2nd off (rain); second run replaced (27 January)
816	GS	1995/96	(Germany) Martina Ertl	(Italy) Deborah Compagnoni	(Germany) Katja Seizinger	this was not Golden Fox race	GS 1 replaced the Lake Louise (it did not count for Golden Fox)
817	GS	1995/96	(Germany) Katja Seizinger	(Switzerland) Sonja Nef	(Germany) Martina Ertl	(Germany) Martina Ertl	
818	SL	1995/96	(Sweden) Kristina Andersson	(Austria) Elfi Eder	(New Zealand) Claudia Riegler	(Germany) Martina Ertl	
847	GS	1996/97	(Italy) Sabina Panzanini	(Italy) Deborah Compagnoni (Austria) Anita Wachter		(Slovenia) Urška Hrovat	
848	SL	1996/97	(Sweden) Pernilla Wiberg	(Slovenia) Urška Hrovat	(Italy) Lara Magoni	(Slovenia) Urška Hrovat	
	GS	1997/98	lack of snow and high temperatures; both events replaced in Bormio				
	SL	1997/98	lack of snow and high temperatures; both events replaced in Bormio				
	SG	1998/99	Super-G cancelled due to fog on 1 January 1999; replaced on the next day with double schedule (first SG, then GS)				
917	SG	1998/99	(Germany) Hilde Gerg	(Germany) Martina Ertl	(Austria) Michaela Dorfmeister	this was not Golden Fox race	the only World Cup SG ever in Slovenia
918	GS	1998/99	(Austria) Anita Wachter	(Switzerland) Sonja Nef	(Austria) Alexandra Meissnitzer	(Austria) Anita Wachter	
919	SL	1998/99	(Sweden) Pernilla Wiberg	(Germany) Hilde Gerg	(Sweden) Ylva Nowén	(Austria) Anita Wachter	
952	GS	1999/00	(Austria) Michaela Dorfmeister	(Switzerland) Sonja Nef	(Austria) Anita Wachter	(Switzerland) Sonja Nef	
953	SL	1999/00	(Norway) Trine Bakke	(Slovenia) Špela Pretnar	(Austria) Sabine Egger	(Switzerland) Sonja Nef	
994	GS	2000/01	(Switzerland) Sonja Nef	(Italy) Karen Putzer	(Austria) Renate Götschl	(Switzerland) Sonja Nef	
	SL	2000/01	cancelled due to high temperatures and rain				
1024	GS	2001/02	(Switzerland) Sonja Nef	(Slovenia) Tina Maze	(Norway) Stina Hofgård Nilsen	(Switzerland) Sonja Nef (GS + SL 2)	Golden Fox (GS combined with SL 2)
1025	SL	2001/02	(Sweden) Anja Pärson	(United States) Kristina Koznick	(France) Laure Pequegnot	this was not Golden Fox race	SL 1 replaced the Megève (it did not count for Golden Fox)
1026	SL	2001/02	(Sweden) Anja Pärson	(France) Laure Pequegnot	(Switzerland) Sonja Nef	(Switzerland) Sonja Nef (SL 2 + GS)	Golden Fox (SL 2 combined with GS)
1067	GS	2002/03	(Sweden) Anja Pärson	(Austria) Nicole Hosp	(Germany) Martina Ertl	(Sweden) Anja Pärson	
1068	SL	2002/03	(Sweden) Anja Pärson	(Croatia) Janica Kostelić	(Austria) Nicole Hosp	(Sweden) Anja Pärson	
1098	GS	2003/04	(Sweden) Anja Pärson	(Austria) Michaela Dorfmeister	(Spain) M. J. Rienda Contreras	(Sweden) Anja Pärson	
1099	SL	2003/04	(Sweden) Anja Pärson	(Austria) Marlies Schild	(Austria) Nicole Hosp	(Sweden) Anja Pärson	
1135	GS	2004/05	(Slovenia) Tina Maze	(Italy) Karen Putzer	(Germany) Martina Ertl	(Sweden) Anja Pärson	
1136	SL	2004/05	(Sweden) Anja Pärson	(Croatia) Janica Kostelić	(Finland) Tanja Poutiainen	(Sweden) Anja Pärson	
	GS	2005/06	cancelled due to snow, rain and fog; replaced in Ofterschwang on 3 February 2006				
1160	SL	2005/06	(Austria) Marlies Schild	(Croatia) Janica Kostelić	(Sweden) Therese Borssén	(Austria) Marlies Schild	
	GS	2006/07	lack of snow and high temperatures; replaced in Kranjska Gora				
	SL	2006/07	lack of snow and high temperatures; replaced in Kranjska Gora				
1233	GS	2007/08	(Austria) Elisabeth Görgl	(Italy) Manuela Mölgg	(Italy) Denise Karbon	(Austria) Nicole Hosp	
1234	SL	2007/08	(Austria) Nicole Hosp	(Slovakia) Veronika Zuzulová	(Austria) Marlies Schild	(Austria) Nicole Hosp	
1265	GS	2008/09	(Slovenia) Tina Maze	(Italy) Denise Karbon	(Germany) Kathrin Hölzl	(Germany) Maria Höfl-Riesch	
1266	SL	2008/09	(Germany) Maria Höfl-Riesch	(Austria) Kathrin Zettel	(Finland) Tanja Poutiainen	(Germany) Maria Höfl-Riesch	
1304	GS	2009/10	(Austria) Kathrin Zettel	(Germany) Maria Riesch	(Sweden) Anja Pärson	(Austria) Kathrin Zettel	
1305	SL	2009/10	(Austria) Kathrin Zettel	(Slovenia) Tina Maze	(Germany) Maria Riesch	(Austria) Kathrin Zettel	
	GS	2010/11	interrupted and cancelled during first run after 25 skiers due to high temperatures				
	SL	2010/11	cancelled due to high temperatures				
	GS	2011/12	lack of snow and high temperatures; replaced in Kranjska Gora				
	SL	2011/12	lack of snow and high temperatures; replaced in Kranjska Gora				
1411	GS	2012/13	(United States) Lindsey Vonn	(Slovenia) Tina Maze	(Austria) Anna Fenninger	(Slovenia) Tina Maze	
1412	SL	2012/13	(Slovenia) Tina Maze	(Sweden) Frida Hansdotter	(Austria) Kathrin Zettel	(Slovenia) Tina Maze	
	GS	2013/14	lack of snow; moved to Kranjska Gora and cancelled due to heavy snowfall; then finally replaced in Åre				
	SL	2013/14	lack of snow; replaced in Kranjska Gora on originally scheduled calendar date				
1475	GS	2014/15	(Austria) Anna Fenninger	(Germany) Viktoria Rebensburg	(Liechtenstein) Tina Weirather	(United States) Mikaela Shiffrin	
1476	SL	2014/15	(United States) Mikaela Shiffrin	(Slovakia) Veronika Velez-Zuzulová	(Czech Republic) Šárka Strachová	(United States) Mikaela Shiffrin	
1509	GS	2015/16	(Germany) Viktoria Rebensburg	(Slovenia) Ana Drev	(Liechtenstein) Tina Weirather	(Germany) Viktoria Rebensburg	
	SL	2015/16	warm temperatures and poor track conditions; replaced in Crans-Montana in 15 February 2016				
1543	GS	2016/17	(France) Tessa Worley	(Italy) Sofia Goggia	(Switzerland) Lara Gut	(United States) Mikaela Shiffrin	
1544	SL	2016/17	(United States) Mikaela Shiffrin	(Switzerland) Wendy Holdener	(Sweden) Frida Hansdotter	(United States) Mikaela Shiffrin	
	GS	2017/18	lack of snow and high temperatures; replaced in Kranjska Gora				
	SL	2017/18	lack of snow and high temperatures; replaced in Kranjska Gora				
1626	GS	2018/19	(Slovakia) Petra Vlhová (United States) Mikaela Shiffrin		(Norway) Ragnhild Mowinckel	(United States) Mikaela Shiffrin	
1627	SL	2018/19	(United States) Mikaela Shiffrin	(Sweden) Anna Swenn-Larsson	(Switzerland) Wendy Holdener	(United States) Mikaela Shiffrin	
	GS	2019/20	lack of snow and high temperatures; replaced in Kranjska Gora				
	SL	2019/20	lack of snow and high temperatures; replaced in Kranjska Gora				
	GS	2020/21	lack of snow and high temperatures; replaced in Kranjska Gora				
	SL	2020/21	lack of snow and high temperatures; replaced in Kranjska Gora				
	GS	2021/22	lack of snow and high temperatures; replaced in Kranjska Gora				
	SL	2021/22	lack of snow and high temperatures; replaced in Kranjska Gora				

Not part of classic Golden Fox competition.

=== Course name confusion ===
Many terms (lifts and slopes have different names) appears for this course which is a bit misleading:

- "Miranova proga A" – is a 2200 metres long WC slope, beginning at top of old Habakuk lift, passing upper GS part and lower SL part and to the finish area (Snow Stadium).
- "Radvanje" – is the name of the Maribor district with 8,000 inhabitants below the finish area (Snow Stadium) and also the old 2-seated same name chairlift parallel to World Cup Slalom slope.
- "Snow Stadium" – Snežni stadion is the flat World Cup finish area surrounded with two hotels, restaurant and multi purpose event den. It is popular gathering place with bottom Radvanje 2-seated chairlift.
- "Pohorje 2" – is a non existing term in the vocabular and official ski resort map legend. It appears only on FIS official result lists site as the name for giant slalom slope, as mentioned, you can't find it anywhere else.
- "Habakuk" – is the first resort lift opened in 1951 (at first 1-seated chairlift, then surface, now removed), named after Bugbear that "lives" in Pohorje and nearby farm. Also the same named hotel in the valley opened in 1974.

== Club5+ ==
In 1986, elite Club5 was originally founded by prestigious classic downhill organizers: Kitzbühel, Wengen, Garmisch, Val d’Isère and Val Gardena/Gröden, with goal to bring alpine ski sport on the highest levels possible.

Later, over the years, other classic long-term organizers joined the now named Club5+: Alta Badia, Cortina, Kranjska Gora, Maribor, Lake Louise, Schladming, Adelboden, Kvitfjell, St.Moritz and Åre.

== Course sections ==
- Habakuk, Luka Cabin, Trikotna jasa, Snežni stadion, Arena
