= Panorama (ski course) =

Ski course in Austria

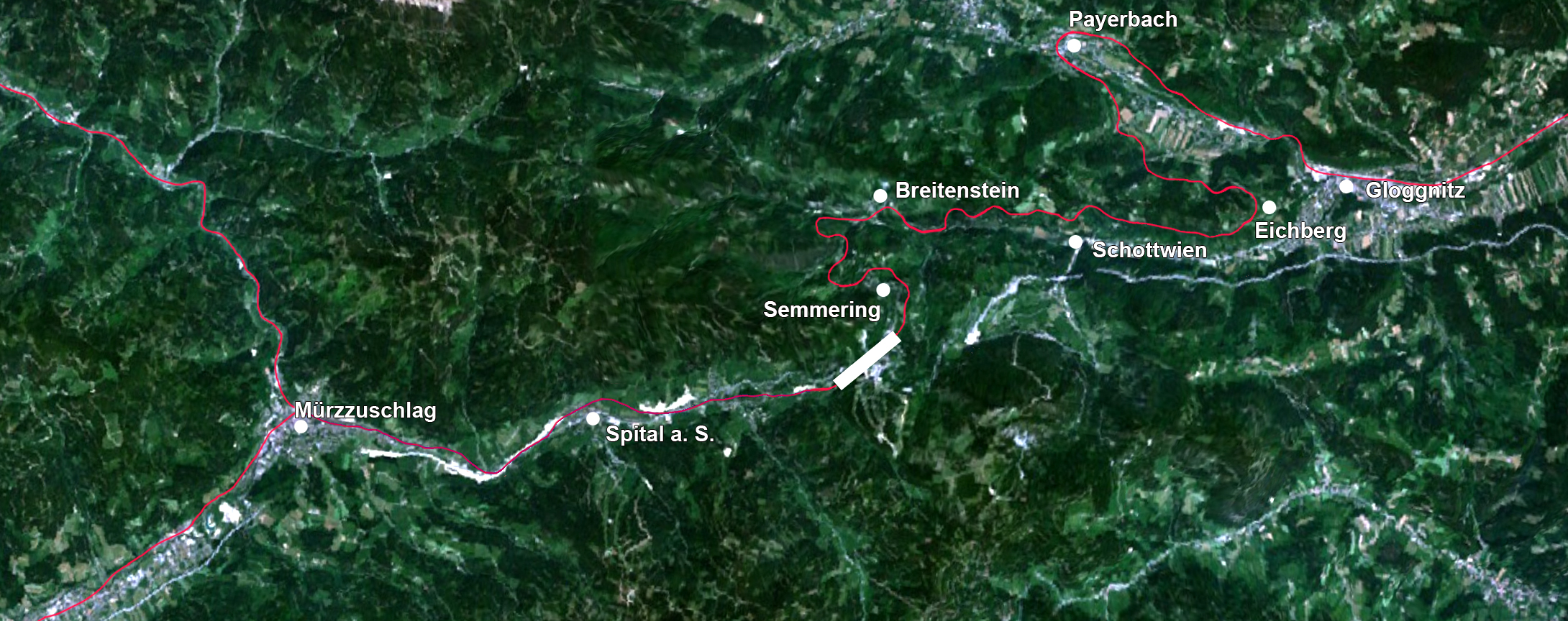
- Interactive map of Panorama
- Location within Austria
- 47°38′49″N 15°49′48″E
- Location: Semmering, Lower Austria
- Mountain: Zauberberg
- Opened: 1995

Giant slalom
- Start: 1,335 m (4,380 ft) (AA)
- Finish: 1,020 m (3,346 ft)
- Vertical drop: 315 m (1,033 ft)
- Max incline: 25.6 degrees (48%)
- Avg incline: 19.8 degrees (36%)
- Min incline: 4.6 degrees (8%)

Slalom
- Start: 1,230 m (4,035 ft) (AA)
- Finish: 1,020 m (3,346 ft)
- Vertical drop: 210 m (689 ft)
- Max incline: 27.5 degrees (52%)
- Avg incline: 22 degrees (40%)
- Min incline: 10.8 degrees (19%)

Panorama is a women's World Cup technical ski course on Zauberberg mountain in Semmering, Lower Austria, opened in 1995. Slope has maximum incline at 27 degrees (51%).

Mikaela Shiffrin won record 8 races in total; record 4 wins in giant slalom and record 4 wins in slalom.

== History ==
On 29 December 1995, they first time hosted World Cup, traditionally between Xmas and New Year's holidays and since 1996/97 exchanging every second year with Lienz, another World Cup host in Austria.

== World Cup ==
Mikaela Shiffrin (USA)

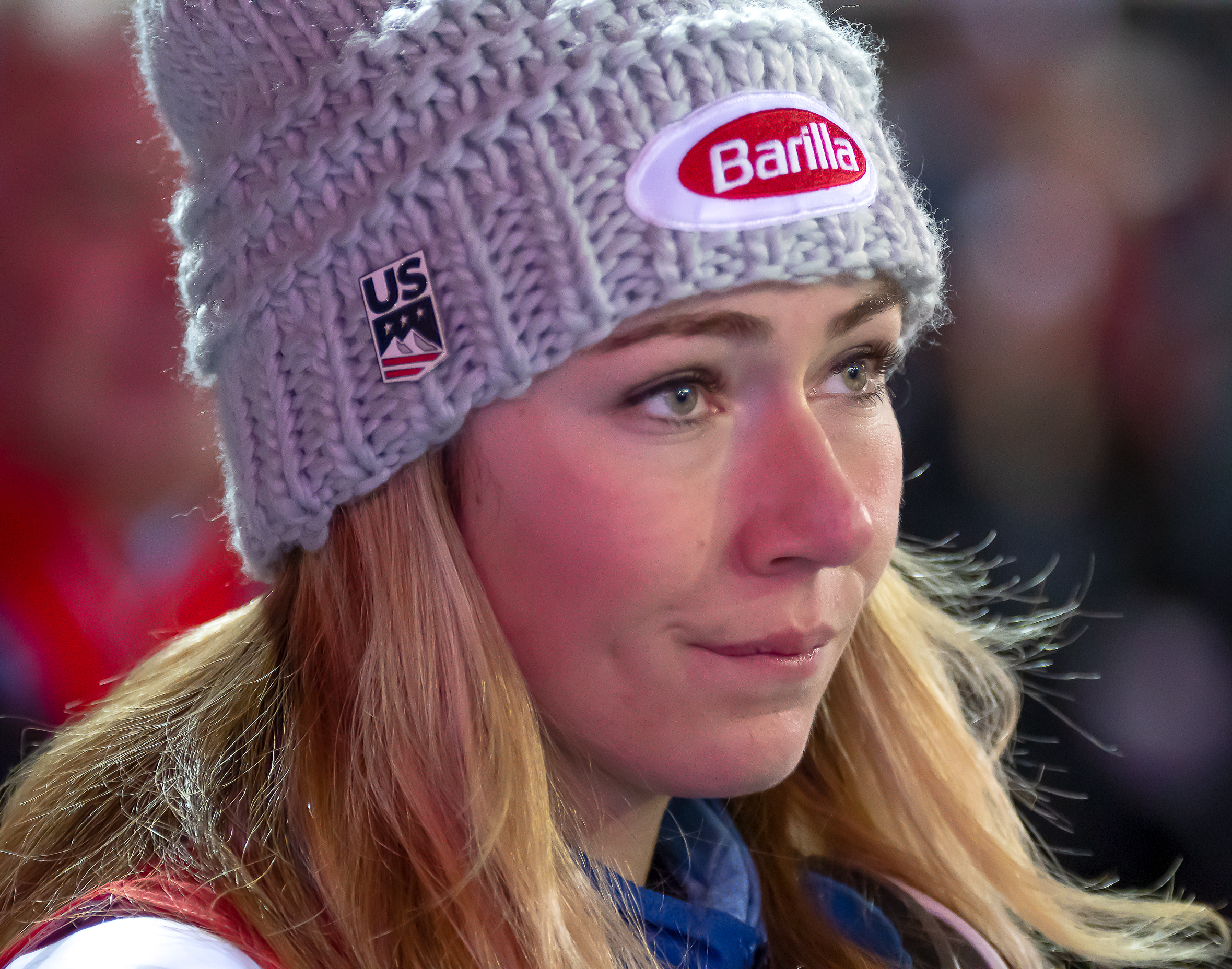
300x

Record 8 wins in total;
and record 4 GS and 4 SL

=== Top 3 results ===
No.	Type	Date	Season	Winner	Second	Third
814	SL	29 December 1995	1995/96	(Sweden) Pernilla Wiberg	(Switzerland) Karin Roten	(Austria) Elfi Eder
815	SL	30 December 1995	1995/96	(Austria) Elfi Eder	(Norway) Marianne Kjørstad	(Sweden) Kristina Andersson
845	SL	28 December 1996	1996/97	(Sweden) Pernilla Wiberg	(Italy) Deborah Compagnoni	(Austria) Anita Wachter
846	SL	29 December 1995	1996/97	(Italy) Deborah Compagnoni	(France) Patricia Chauvet	(New Zealand) Claudia Riegler
915	GS	27 December 1998	1998/99	(Austria) Anita Wachter	(Austria) Alexandra Meissnitzer	(Norway) Andrine Flemmen
916	SL	28 December 1998	1998/99	(United States) Kristina Koznick	(Switzerland) Karin Roten	(Sweden) Pernilla Wiberg
992	GS	28 December 2000	2000/01	(Switzerland) Sonja Nef	(Switzerland) Corinne Rey-Bellet	(United States) Sarah Schleper
993	SL	29 December 2000	2000/01	(Croatia) Janica Kostelić	(Switzerland) Sonja Nef	(Norway) Trine Bakke
1059	GS	28 December 2002	2002/03	(Italy) Karen Putzer	(Croatia) Janica Kostelić	(Austria) Nicole Hosp (Italy) Denise Karbon
1060	SL	29 December 2002	2002/03	(Croatia) Janica Kostelić	(France) Christel Pascal	(Italy) Nicole Gius
1124	GS	28 December 2004	2004/05	(Austria) Marlies Schild	(Finland) Tanja Poutiainen	(Austria) Elisabeth Görgl
1125	SL	29 December 2004	2004/05	(Austria) Marlies Schild	(Croatia) Janica Kostelić	(Finland) Tanja Poutiainen
1193	GS	28 December 2006	2006/07	(Austria) Kathrin Zettel	(Austria) Nicole Hosp	(Austria) Marlies Schild
1194	SL	29 December 2006	2006/07	(Sweden) Therese Borssén	(Austria) Kathrin Zettel	(Austria) Marlies Schild
1262	GS	28 December 2008	2008/09	(Austria) Kathrin Zettel	(Italy) Manuela Mölgg	(Switzerland) Lara Gut
1263	SL	29 December 2008	2008/09	(Germany) Maria Riesch	(Finland) Tanja Poutiainen	(United States) Lindsey Vonn
1329	GS	28 December 2010	2010/11	(France) Tessa Worley	(Germany) Maria Riesch	(Germany) Kathrin Hölzl
1330	SL	29 December 2010	2010/11	(Austria) Marlies Schild	(Germany) Maria Riesch	(Germany) Christina Geiger
1402	GS	28 December 2012	2012/13	(Austria) Anna Fenninger	(Slovenia) Tina Maze	(France) Tessa Worley
1403	SL	29 December 2012	2012/13	(Slovakia) Veronika Velez-Zuzulová	(Austria) Kathrin Zettel	(Slovenia) Tina Maze
	GS	28 December 2014	2014/15	lack of snow; replaced in Kühtai on 28 December 2014		
	SL	29 December 2014	2014/15	lack of snow; replaced in Kühtai on 29 December 2014		
1539	GS	27 December 2016	2016/17	(United States) Mikaela Shiffrin	(France) Tessa Worley	(Italy) Manuela Mölgg
1540	GS	28 December 2016	2016/17	(United States) Mikaela Shiffrin	(France) Tessa Worley	(Germany) Viktoria Rebensburg
1541	SL	29 December 2016	2016/17	(United States) Mikaela Shiffrin	(Slovakia) Veronika Velez-Zuzulová	(Switzerland) Wendy Holdener
1615	GS	28 December 2018	2018/19	(Slovakia) Petra Vlhová	(Germany) Viktoria Rebensburg	(France) Tessa Worley
1616	SL	29 December 2018	2018/19	(United States) Mikaela Shiffrin	(Slovakia) Petra Vlhová	(Switzerland) Wendy Holdener
	GS	28 December 2020	2020/21	cancelled in second run due to strong wind		
1676	SL	29 December 2020	2020/21	(Switzerland) Michelle Gisin	(Austria) Katharina Liensberger	(United States) Mikaela Shiffrin
1747	GS	27 December 2022	2022/23	(United States) Mikaela Shiffrin	(Slovakia) Petra Vlhová	(Italy) Marta Bassino
1748	GS	28 December 2022	2022/23	(United States) Mikaela Shiffrin	(Switzerland) Lara Gut-Behrami	(Italy) Marta Bassino
1749	SL	29 December 2022	2022/23	(United States) Mikaela Shiffrin	(United States) Paula Moltzan	(Germany) Lena Dürr
1820	GS	28 December 2024	2024/25	(Italy) Federica Brignone	(Sweden) Sara Hector	(New Zealand) Alice Robinson
1821	SL	29 December 2024	2024/25	(Croatia) Zrinka Ljutić	(Germany) Lena Dürr	(Austria) Katharina Liensberger
1859	GS	27 December 2025	2025/26	(Austria) Julia Scheib	(Switzerland) Camille Rast	(Sweden) Sara Hector
1860	SL	28 December 2025	2025/26	(United States) Mikaela Shiffrin	(Switzerland) Camille Rast	(Albania) Lara Colturi

Replacing other cancelled events: Val d'Isere (2016) and Sölden (2022).
