= 1995–96 FIS Alpine Ski World Cup =

International sports competition

FIS Alpine Ski World Cup 1995/96
Discipline	Men	Women
Overall	(Norway) Lasse Kjus	(Germany) Katja Seizinger
Downhill	(France) Luc Alphand	(United States) Picabo Street
Super G	(Norway) Atle Skårdal	(Germany) Katja Seizinger
Giant Slalom	(Switzerland) Michael von Grünigen	(Germany) Martina Ertl
Slalom	(France) Sébastien Amiez	(Austria) Elfi Eder
Nations Cup	Austria	Austria
- Nations Cup overall: Austria

Competition
Locations	20	14
Individual	35	34

The 30th World Cup season began in November 1995 in Tignes, France, and concluded in March 1996 at the World Cup finals in Lillehammer, Norway. The overall champions were Lasse Kjus of Norway and Katja Seizinger of Germany, the first of two overall titles for both.

The World Cup schedule was realigned for the 1995–96 season, with the North American events moved to the early part of the season, in late November and early December. Previously, these races in Canada and the United States were scheduled near the end of the season, in late February and early March.

A break in the schedule was for the 1996 World Championships, held 12–25 February in southern Spain at Sierra Nevada. These championships were originally scheduled for 1995, but were postponed due to a lack of snow.

== Calendar ==
=== Men ===
Event Key: DH – Downhill, SL – Slalom, GS – Giant Slalom, SG – Super Giant Slalom, KB – Combined
Race	Season	Date	Place	Type	Winner	Second	Third
861	1	12 November 1995	(France) Tignes	GS _{221}	(Switzerland) Michael von Grünigen	(Norway) Lasse Kjus	(Switzerland) Urs Kälin
862	2	17 November 1995	(United States) Beaver Creek	GS _{222}	(Switzerland) Michael von Grünigen	(Norway) Lasse Kjus	(Switzerland) Urs Kälin
863	3	19 November 1995	(United States) Beaver Creek	SL _{256}	(Austria) Michael Tritscher	(France) Sébastien Amiez	(Italy) Alberto Tomba
864	4	25 November 1995	(United States) Park City	GS _{223}	(Switzerland) Michael von Grünigen	(Norway) Lasse Kjus	(Austria) Hans Knauß
865	5	26 November 1995	(United States) Park City	SL _{257}	(Slovenia) Andrej Miklavc	(Austria) Christian Mayer	(Italy) Fabio De Crignis
866	6	1 December 1995	(United States) Vail	DH _{254}	(France) Luc Alphand	(Norway) Lasse Kjus	(Austria) Patrick Ortlieb
867	7	2 December 1995	(United States) Vail	SG _{063}	(Norway) Lasse Kjus	(Austria) Richard Kröll	(Italy) Pietro Vitalini
868	8	9 December 1995	(France) Val d'Isère	DH _{255}	(France) Luc Alphand	(Austria) Roland Assinger	(Austria) Hannes Trinkl
869	9	10 December 1995	(France) Val d'Isère	SG _{064}	(Norway) Atle Skårdal	(Norway) Lasse Kjus	(Austria) Hans Knauß
870	10	16 December 1995	(Italy) Val Gardena	DH _{256}	(Austria) Patrick Ortlieb	(Switzerland) Xavier Gigandet	(France) Luc Alphand
871	11	17 December 1995	(Italy) Alta Badia	GS _{224}	(Austria) Hans Knauß	(Switzerland) Michael von Grünigen	(Italy) Alberto Tomba
872	12	19 December 1995	(Italy) Madonna di Campiglio	SL _{258}	(Italy) Alberto Tomba	(France) Yves Dimier	(Italy) Konrad Ladstätter
873	13	21 December 1995	(Slovenia) Kranjska Gora	GS _{225}	(Norway) Lasse Kjus	(Switzerland) Michael von Grünigen	(Austria) Mario Reiter
874	14	22 December 1995	(Slovenia) Kranjska Gora	SL _{259}	(Italy) Alberto Tomba	(Slovenia) Jure Košir	(France) Sébastien Amiez
875	15	29 December 1995	(Italy) Bormio	DH _{257}	(Norway) Lasse Kjus	(Austria) Andreas Schifferer	(Canada) Ed Podivinsky
876	16	6 January 1996	(Austria) Flachau	GS _{226}	(Switzerland) Urs Kälin	(Italy) Alberto Tomba	(Switzerland) Michael von Grünigen
877	17	7 January 1996	(Austria) Flachau	SL _{260}	(Italy) Alberto Tomba	(Austria) Mario Reiter	(Slovenia) Jure Košir
878	18	13 January 1996	(Austria) Kitzbühel	DH _{258}	(Austria) Günther Mader	(France) Luc Alphand	(Italy) Peter Runggaldier
879	19	14 January 1996	(Austria) Kitzbühel	SL _{261}	(Austria) Thomas Sykora	(Italy) Alberto Tomba	(Slovenia) Jure Košir
880	20	14 January 1996	(Austria) Kitzbühel	KB _{070}	(Austria) Günther Mader	(Austria) Hans Knauß	(Switzerland) Bruno Kernen
881	21	16 January 1996	(Switzerland) Adelboden	GS _{227}	(Switzerland) Michael von Grünigen	(Switzerland) Urs Kälin	(Norway) Tom Stiansen
882	22	19 January 1996	(Switzerland) Veysonnaz	DH _{259}	(Switzerland) Bruno Kernen	(Switzerland) William Besse	(Switzerland) Daniel Mahrer
883	23	20 January 1996	(Switzerland) Veysonnaz	DH _{260}	(Switzerland) Bruno Kernen	(France) Luc Alphand (Austria) Patrick Ortlieb	
884	24	21 January 1996	(Switzerland) Veysonnaz	SL _{262}	(France) Sébastien Amiez	(Slovenia) Rene Mlekuž	(Austria) Thomas Sykora
885	25	21 January 1996	(Switzerland) Veysonnaz	KB _{071}	(Luxembourg) Marc Girardelli	(Austria) Günther Mader	(Norway) Kjetil André Aamodt
886	26	23 January 1996	(France) Valloire	SG _{065}	(Austria) Hans Knauß	(Norway) Atle Skårdal	(Sweden) Fredrik Nyberg
887	27	27 January 1996	(Italy) Sestriere	SL _{263}	(Austria) Mario Reiter	(Austria) Thomas Sykora	(Austria) Thomas Stangassinger
888	28	2 February 1996	(Germany) Garmisch-Partenkirchen	DH _{261}	(France) Luc Alphand	(Canada) Brian Stemmle	(Italy) Peter Runggaldier
889	29	5 February 1996	(Germany) Garmisch-Partenkirchen	SG _{066}	(Italy) Werner Perathoner	(France) Luc Alphand	(Austria) Patrick Wirth
890	30	10 February 1996	(Austria) Hinterstoder	GS _{228}	(Switzerland) Michael von Grünigen	(Switzerland) Urs Kälin	(Austria) Mario Reiter
World Championships (12–25 February)
891	31	3 March 1996	(Japan) Hakuba	SG _{067}	(Italy) Peter Runggaldier	(Norway) Atle Skårdal	(Austria) Hans Knauß
892	32	6 March 1996	(Norway) Kvitfjell	DH _{262}	(Norway) Lasse Kjus	(Austria) Günther Mader	(Italy) Kristian Ghedina
893	33	7 March 1996	(Norway) Kvitfjell	SG _{068}	(Norway) Kjetil André Aamodt	(France) Luc Alphand	(Norway) Lasse Kjus
894	34	9 March 1996	(Norway) Hafjell	GS _{229}	(Switzerland) Urs Kälin	(Norway) Tom Stiansen	(France) Christophe Saioni
895	35	10 March 1996	(Norway) Hafjell	SL _{264}	(Austria) Thomas Sykora	(France) Sébastien Amiez	(Slovenia) Jure Košir

=== Ladies ===
Event Key: DH – Downhill, SL – Slalom, GS – Giant Slalom, SG – Super Giant Slalom, KB – Combined
Race	Season	Date	Place	Type	Winner	Second	Third
802	1	16 November 1995	(United States) Vail	SG _{063}	(Germany) Martina Ertl	(Germany) Katja Seizinger	(Italy) Isolde Kostner
803	2	18 November 1995	(United States) Vail	SL _{248}	(Sweden) Pernilla Wiberg	(Slovenia) Urška Hrovat	(Sweden) Kristina Andersson
804	3	3 December 1995	(Canada) Lake Louise	DH _{214}	(United States) Picabo Street	(Germany) Katja Seizinger	(Russia) Warwara Zelenskaja
805	4	7 December 1995	(France) Val d'Isère	SG _{064}	(Austria) Alexandra Meissnitzer	(Switzerland) Heidi Zeller-Bähler	(Slovenia) Mojca Suhadolc
806	5	8 December 1995	(France) Val d'Isère	GS _{218}	(Germany) Martina Ertl	(Slovenia) Mojca Suhadolc	(Austria) Alexandra Meissnitzer
807	6	15 December 1995	(Austria) St. Anton am Arlberg	DH _{215}	(Germany) Katja Seizinger	(Switzerland) Heidi Zurbriggen	(Austria) Alexandra Meissnitzer
808	7	16 December 1995	(Austria) St. Anton am Arlberg	DH _{216}	(Austria) Michaela Dorfmeister	(Austria) Alexandra Meissnitzer	(United States) Picabo Street (Austria) Renate Götschl
809	8	17 December 1995	(Austria) St. Anton am Arlberg	SL _{249}	(Austria) Elfi Eder	(Slovenia) Urška Hrovat	(Slovenia) Katja Koren
810	9	17 December 1995	(Austria) St. Anton am Arlberg	KB _{062}	(Austria) Anita Wachter	(Norway) Ingeborg Helen Marken	(Germany) Hilde Gerg
811	10	20 December 1995	(Switzerland) Veysonnaz	SG _{065}	(Austria) Alexandra Meissnitzer	(Switzerland) Heidi Zurbriggen	(Austria) Michaela Dorfmeister
812	11	21 December 1995	(Switzerland) Veysonnaz	GS _{219}	(Germany) Martina Ertl	(Italy) Sabina Panzanini	(Austria) Anita Wachter
813	12	22 December 1995	(Switzerland) Veysonnaz	SL _{250}	(Sweden) Pernilla Wiberg	(Slovenia) Urška Hrovat	(Sweden) Kristina Andersson
814	13	29 December 1995	(Austria) Semmering	SL _{251}	(Sweden) Pernilla Wiberg	(Switzerland) Karin Roten	(Austria) Elfi Eder
815	14	30 December 1995	(Austria) Semmering	SL _{252}	(Austria) Elfi Eder	(Norway) Marianne Kjørstad	(Sweden) Kristina Andersson
816	15	5 January 1996	(Slovenia) Maribor	GS _{220}	(Germany) Martina Ertl	(Italy) Deborah Compagnoni	(Germany) Katja Seizinger
817	16	6 January 1996	(Slovenia) Maribor	GS _{221}	(Germany) Katja Seizinger	(Switzerland) Sonja Nef	(Germany) Martina Ertl
818	17	7 January 1996	(Slovenia) Maribor	SL _{253}	(Sweden) Kristina Andersson	(Austria) Elfi Eder	(New Zealand) Claudia Riegler
819	18	13 January 1996	(Germany) Garmisch-Partenkirchen	SG _{066}	(Germany) Katja Seizinger	(Germany) Martina Ertl	(Austria) Alexandra Meissnitzer
820	19	14 January 1996	(Germany) Garmisch-Partenkirchen	SL _{254}	(Slovenia) Urška Hrovat	(Austria) Elfi Eder	(Italy) Roberta Serra
821	20	19 January 1996	(Italy) Cortina d'Ampezzo	DH _{217}	(United States) Picabo Street	(Sweden) Pernilla Wiberg	(Italy) Isolde Kostner
822	21	20 January 1996	(Italy) Cortina d'Ampezzo	DH _{218}	(Italy) Isolde Kostner	(United States) Picabo Street	(Austria) Renate Götschl
823	22	21 January 1996	(Italy) Cortina d'Ampezzo	GS _{222}	(Austria) Anita Wachter	(Sweden) Erika Hansson	(Germany) Katja Seizinger
824	23	26 January 1996	(Italy) Sestriere	SL _{255}	(Switzerland) Sonja Nef	(Switzerland) Marlies Oester	(Sweden) Pernilla Wiberg
825	24	28 January 1996	(France) Saint Gervais	SL _{256}	(New Zealand) Claudia Riegler	(Switzerland) Karin Roten	(Sweden) Pernilla Wiberg
826	25	2 February 1996	(France) Val d'Isère	SG _{067}	(Germany) Katja Seizinger	(Austria) Renate Götschl	(Germany) Hilde Gerg
827	26	3 February 1996	(France) Val d'Isère	DH _{219}	(Germany) Katja Seizinger	(United States) Picabo Street	(Italy) Isolde Kostner
828	27	4 February 1996	(France) Val d'Isère	SG _{068}	(Germany) Katja Seizinger	(Italy) Isolde Kostner	(Austria) Renate Götschl
World Championships (12–25 February)
829	28	29 February 1996	(Norway) Narvik	DH _{220}	(United States) Picabo Street	(Russia) Warwara Zelenskaja	(Switzerland) Heidi Zurbriggen
830	29	1 March 1996	(Norway) Narvik	DH _{221}	(Russia) Warwara Zelenskaja	(United States) Picabo Street	(Switzerland) Heidi Zurbriggen
831	30	2 March 1996	(Norway) Narvik	GS _{223}	(Italy) Deborah Compagnoni	(Italy) Sabina Panzanini	(Italy) Isolde Kostner
832	31	6 March 1996	(Norway) Kvitfjell	DH _{222}	(Switzerland) Heidi Zurbriggen	(Italy) Isolde Kostner	(Germany) Katja Seizinger
833	32	7 March 1996	(Norway) Kvitfjell	SG _{069}	(Norway) Ingeborg Helen Marken	(Germany) Katja Seizinger	(Italy) Isolde Kostner
834	33	9 March 1996	(Norway) Hafjell	GS _{224}	(Germany) Katja Seizinger	(Germany) Martina Ertl	(Austria) Alexandra Meissnitzer
835	34	10 March 1996	(Norway) Hafjell	SL _{257}	(Switzerland) Karin Roten	(Sweden) Pernilla Wiberg	(Norway) Marianne Kjørstad

== Men ==
=== Overall ===
see complete table

Place	Name	Country	Total
1	Lasse Kjus	Norway	1216
2	Günther Mader	Austria	991
3	Michael von Grünigen	Switzerland	880
4	Luc Alphand	France	839
5	Alberto Tomba	Italy	766
6	Hans Knauß	Austria	748
7	Fredrik Nyberg	Sweden	673
8	Mario Reiter	Austria	667
9	Urs Kälin	Switzerland	601
10	Kjetil André Aamodt	Norway	560

=== Downhill ===
see complete table

In Men's Downhill World Cup 1995/96 all results count.

Place	Name	Country	Total	6 (United States)	8 (France)	10 (Italy)	15 (Italy)	18 (Austria)	22 (Switzerland)	23 (Switzerland)	28 (Germany)	32 (Norway)
1	Luc Alphand	France	577	100	100	60	3	80	9	80	100	45
2	Günther Mader	Austria	407	36	50	22	36	100	6	32	45	80
3	Patrick Ortlieb	Austria	359	60	15	100	-	32	32	80	40	-
4	Lasse Kjus	Norway	343	80	-	45	100	-	-	-	18	100
5	Bruno Kernen	Switzerland	325	-	32	1	16	26	100	100	14	36
6	Xavier Gigandet	Switzerland	274	50	45	80	-	-	50	29	20	-
7	Peter Runggaldier	Italy	261	22	10	-	40	60	3	16	60	50
8	Kristian Ghedina	Italy	237	18	-	24	20	50	-	15	50	60
9	Werner Perathoner	Italy	233	-	24	12	50	36	16	40	26	29
10	Brian Stemmle	Canada	230	24	-	32	2	11	45	36	80	-

=== Super G ===
see complete table

In Men's Super G World Cup 1995/96 all results count. Atle Skårdal won the cup with only one race win. All races were won by a different athlete.

Place	Name	Country	Total	7 (United States)	9 (France)	26 (France)	29 (Germany)	31 (Japan)	33 (Norway)
1	Atle Skårdal	Norway	312	20	100	80	-	80	32
2	Hans Knauß	Austria	267	29	60	100	18	60	-
3	Lasse Kjus	Norway	264	100	80	-	-	24	60
4	Luc Alphand	France	262	36	-	40	80	26	80
5	Peter Runggaldier	Italy	239	15	45	29	-	100	50
6	Richard Kröll	Austria	223	80	29	16	36	40	22
7	Fredrik Nyberg	Sweden	217	45	36	60	20	11	45
8	Kjetil André Aamodt	Norway	179	-	-	32	18	29	100
9	Werner Perathoner	Italy	173	26	-	22	100	5	20
10	Kristian Ghedina	Italy	170	40	13	26	40	22	29

=== Giant Slalom ===
see complete table

In Men's Giant Slalom World Cup 1995/96 all results count.

Place	Name	Country	Total	1 (France)	2 (United States)	4 (United States)	11 (Italy)	13 (Slovenia)	16 (Austria)	21 (Switzerland)	30 (Austria)	34 (Norway)
1	Michael von Grünigen	Switzerland	738	100	100	100	80	80	60	100	100	18
2	Urs Kälin	Switzerland	601	60	60	36	40	45	100	80	80	100
3	Lasse Kjus	Norway	475	80	80	80	50	100	45	-	40	-
4	Fredrik Nyberg	Sweden	338	26	40	50	32	36	32	50	32	40
5	Hans Knauß	Austria	306	36	32	60	100	18	36	24	-	-
6	Steve Locher	Switzerland	283	50	22	9	45	36	50	-	26	45
	Mario Reiter	Austria	283	-	45	-	24	60	29	36	60	29
8	Christophe Saioni	France	276	32	-	29	12	40	26	32	45	60
	Alberto Tomba	Italy	276	-	36	-	60	-	80	-	50	50
10	Tom Stiansen	Norway	218	-	24	14	-	4	-	60	36	80

=== Slalom ===
see complete table

In Men's Slalom World Cup 1995/96 all results count. Sébastien Amiez won the cup despite only one race win.

Place	Name	Country	Total	3 (United States)	5 (United States)	12 (Italy)	14 (Slovenia)	17 (Austria)	19 (Austria)	24 (Switzerland)	27 (Italy)	35 (Norway)
1	Sébastien Amiez	France	539	80	50	50	60	45	50	100	24	80
2	Alberto Tomba	Italy	490	60	-	100	100	100	80	-	-	50
3	Thomas Sykora	Austria	446	20	-	-	36	50	100	60	80	100
4	Mario Reiter	Austria	384	-	29	45	40	80	45	-	100	45
5	Jure Košir	Slovenia	381	40	45	-	80	60	60	-	36	60
6	Andrej Miklavc	Slovenia	299	-	100	-	26	18	24	45	50	36
7	Finn Christian Jagge	Norway	256	32	36	32	26	40	29	29	-	32
8	Fabio De Crignis	Italy	242	22	60	29	29	13	20	24	45	-
	Yves Dimier	France	242	-	-	80	32	-	22	50	18	40
	Christian Mayer	Austria	242	-	80	-	50	24	40	-	22	26
11	Ole Kristian Furuseth	Norway	189	-	-	24	20	36	18	22	40	29
12	Thomas Stangassinger	Austria	166	-	22	-	26	22	36	-	60	-
13	Michael von Grünigen	Switzerland	142	-	-	20	18	32	-	36	12	24
14	Lasse Kjus	Norway	134	45	-	-	45	26	-	-	-	18
15	Andrea Zinsli	Switzerland	133	26	32	14	5	11	9	14	-	22
16	Konrad Ladstätter	Italy	128	18	11	60	12	4	-	15	8	-
	Fabrizio Tescari	Italy	128	-	16	40	3	7	-	26	16	20
18	Kjetil André Aamodt	Norway	127	50	-	-	10	29	-	12	26	-
19	Kiminobu Kimura	Japan	116	-	-	-	1	6	32	32	29	16
20	Marc Girardelli	Luxembourg	112	-	-	-	16	15	26	40	15	-
21	Michael Tritscher	Austria	100	100	-	-	-	-	-	-	-	-

=== Combined ===
see complete table

In Men's Combined World Cup 1995/96 both results count.

Place	Name	Country	Total	20 (Austria)	25 (Switzerland)
1	Günther Mader	Austria	180	100	80
2	Marc Girardelli	Luxembourg	100	-	100
3	Alessandro Fattori	Italy	90	40	50
4	Hans Knauß	Austria	80	80	-
5	Kristian Ghedina	Italy	76	50	26
6	Patrik Järbyn	Sweden	61	32	29
7	Bruno Kernen	Switzerland	60	60	-
	Kjetil André Aamodt	Norway	60	-	60
9	Ed Podivinsky	Canada	45	45	-
	Fredrik Nyberg	Sweden	45	-	45

== Ladies ==
=== Overall ===
Place	Name	Country	Total
1	Katja Seizinger	Germany	1472
2	Martina Ertl	Germany	1059
3	Anita Wachter	Austria	1044
4	Isolde Kostner	Italy	905
5	Alexandra Meissnitzer	Austria	894
6	Picabo Street	United States	837
7	Heidi Zurbriggen	Switzerland	785
8	Pernilla Wiberg	Sweden	777
9	Michaela Dorfmeister	Austria	727
10	Renate Götschl	Austria	594

=== Downhill ===
Place	Name	Country	Total
1	Picabo Street	United States	640
2	Katja Seizinger	Germany	485
3	Isolde Kostner	Italy	449
	Heidi Zurbriggen	Switzerland	449
5	Varvara Zelenskaja	Russia	424

=== Super G ===
Place	Name	Country	Total
1	Katja Seizinger	Germany	545
2	Alexandra Meissnitzer	Austria	374
3	Martina Ertl	Germany	335
4	Isolde Kostner	Italy	291
5	Renate Götschl	Austria	424

=== Giant Slalom ===
Place	Name	Country	Total
1	Martina Ertl	Germany	485
2	Katja Seizinger	Germany	410
3	Anita Wachter	Austria	371
4	Sabina Panzanini	Italy	313
5	Sonja Nef	Switzerland	292

=== Slalom ===
Place	Name	Country	Total
1	Elfi Eder	Austria	580
2	Urska Hrovat	Slovenia	440
3	Pernilla Wiberg	Sweden	414
4	Marianne Kjørstad	Norway	398
5	Kristina Andersson	Sweden	360

=== Combined ===
Place	Name	Country	Total
1	Anita Wachter	Austria	100
2	Ingeborg Helen Marken	Norway	80
3	Hilde Gerg	Germany	60
4	Miriam Vogt	Germany	50
5	Picabo Street	United States	45
