= Andrej Miklavc =

Slovenian alpine skier (born 1970)

Personal information
- Born: June 5, 1970 (age 56) Žabnica, SFR Yugoslavia

Skiing career
- Sport: Alpine skiing
- Retired: 2001
- Disciplines: Giant slalom, slalom
- World Cup debut: 1992

Olympics
- Teams: 3
- Medals: 0 (0 gold)

World Championships
- Medals: 0 (0 gold)

World Cup
- Seasons: 10
- Wins: 1
- Podiums: 1
- Overall titles: 0
- Discipline titles: 0

Andrej Miklavc (born June 5, 1970) is a former alpine skier.

In his career, Miklavc won one Alpine Skiing World Cup Slalom race in ten World Cup seasons and achieved thirteen top ten positions. His only win was the Park City Slalom in the 1995/96 season. Miklavc represented Slovenia at the 1992 Winter Olympics, 1994 Winter Olympics and 1998 Winter Olympics.

== World cup results ==
=== Season standings ===
Season	Age	Overall	Slalom	Giant slalom	Super-G	Downhill	Combined
1993	22	111	41	—	—	—	—
1994	23	106	38	—	—	—	—
1995	24	54	19	47	—	—	—
1996	25	24	6	—	—	—	—
1997	26	43	13	—	—	—	—
1998	27	43	11	—	—	—	—
1999	28	—	—	—	—	—	—
2000	29	81	36	—	—	—	—
2001	30	74	26	—	—	—	—

=== Race podiums ===
Season	Date	Location	Discipline	Position
1996	26 November 1995	Park City, United States	Slalom	1st
