= Luc Alphand =

French alpine ski racer

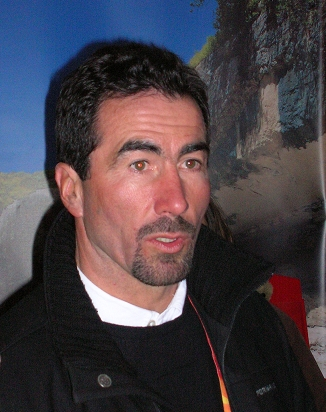

Personal information
- Born: 6 August 1965 (age 61) Briançon, Hautes-Alpes, France
- Height: 1.82 m (6 ft 0 in)
- Children: Estelle Alphand; Nils Alphand
- Website: luc-alphand.com

Skiing career
- Sport: Alpine skiing ♂
- Retired: March 1997 (age 31)
- Disciplines: Downhill, super-G, combined
- World Cup debut: 7 December 1987 (age 22) (first top 15 finish)

Olympics
- Teams: 3 – (1988, 1992, 1994)
- Medals: 0

World Championships
- Teams: 4 – (1985, 1993, 1996, 1997)
- Medals: 1 (0 gold)

World Cup
- Seasons: 10 – (1988–97)
- Wins: 12 – (10 DH, 2 SG)
- Podiums: 23 – (18 DH, 5 SG)
- Overall titles: 1 – (1997)
- Discipline titles: 4 – (3 DH – 1995, 1996, 1997; 1 SG – 1997)
Medal record
Men's alpine skiing
Representing France
World Cup race podiums
Event	1st	2nd	3rd
Downhill	10	5	3
Super-G	2	2	1
Total	12	7	4
World Championships
Bronze medal – third place	1996 Sierra Nevada	Downhill
Junior World Ski Championships
Gold medal – first place	1983 Sestriere	Downhill
Silver medal – second place	1983 Sestriere	Combined

Luc Aimé Alphand (born 6 August 1965) is a former World Cup alpine ski racer from France. He specialized in the speed events and later became a race car driver.

== Ski racing ==
Born in Briançon (Hautes-Alpes), Alphand was world junior champion in 1983 and made his World Cup debut in 1984. It took a decade for him to make his breakthrough winning his first world cup at Kitzbühel 1995, and going on to take the overall downhill title three years in a row. In 1997, he won the World Cup overall title by collecting points only in the two speed disciplines, downhill and super G – a unique achievement in World Cup history. For this accomplishment, he was voted L'Equipe Champion of Champions in 1997. The previous year, he won a bronze medal at the 1996 World Championships at Sierra Nevada, Spain.

In the village of Chantemerle (which neighbours his home town of Briançon in the Serre-Chevalier region), an expert ski run has been named in his honour.

Alphand's daughter, Estelle, represents Sweden in FIS Alpine Ski World Cup. His son Nils Alphand skied for France at the 2026 Olympics.

=== World Cup results ===
==== Season standings ====
Season	Age	Overall	Slalom	Giant slalom	Super-G	Downhill	Combined
1988	22	61	—	—	16	37	—
1989	23	40	—	—	10	—	—
1990	24	80	—	—	21	—	—
1991	25	35	—	—	10	17	—
1992	26	53	—	—	19	25	—
1993	27	59	—	—	20	40	23
1994	28	27	—	—	17	14	—
1995	29	8	—	—	14	1	11
1996	30	4	—	—	4	1	—
1997	31	1	—	—	1	1	—

==== Season titles ====
Season	Discipline
1995	Downhill
1996	Downhill
1997	Overall
1997	Downhill
1997	Super G

==== Race victories ====
- 12 wins (10 DH, 2 SG)
- 23 podiums (18 DH, 5 SG)

Season	Date	Location	Discipline
1995	13 Jan 1995	Kitzbühel, Austria	Downhill
1995	14 Jan 1995	Kitzbühel, Austria	Downhill
1995	15 Mar 1995	Bormio, Italy	Downhill
1996	1 Dec 1995	(United States) Vail, USA	Downhill
1996	9 Dec 1995	Val-d'Isère, France	Downhill
1996	2 Feb 1996	Garmisch-Partenkirchen, Germany	Downhill
1997	20 Dec 1996	Val Gardena, Italy	Downhill
1997	29 Dec 1996	Bormio, Italy	Downhill
1997	24 Jan 1997	Kitzbühel, Austria	Downhill
1997	29 Jan 1997	Laax, Switzerland	Super-G
1997	21 Feb 1997	Garmisch-Partenkirchen, Germany	Super-G
1997	22 Feb 1997	Garmisch-Partenkirchen, Germany	Downhill

=== Other results ===
- Junior World Champion of the downhill in 1983
- French Alpine Skiing Championship
  - Champion of the downhill in 1985, 1987, 1989, 1990 and 1994
  - Champion of the super-G in 1988
  - Champion of combined in 1987

== Auto racing ==
24 Hours of Le Mans career
- Years: 2001–2009
- Teams: Luc Alphand Aventures
- Best finish: 7th (2006)
- Class wins: 0

Alphand retired from competitive skiing in 1997 and started a career in auto racing. First in the Nissan Micra Stars Cup (1997–1998), then in the European Le Mans Series (2001), the FIA GT Championship (2002), and the Lamborghini Supertrophy (2002). He won the 2006 Dakar Rally, in which he had finished runner-up a year earlier. With this victory, he was the first ex-skier to win the Paris-Dakar. He recently purchased two Corvette race cars from Pratt & Miller for use in the Le Mans Series and 24 Hours of Le Mans.

Alphand suffered severe back injuries in an accident on the Rand'Auvergne all-terrain motorcycle race on 27 June 2009. In November 2010, he retired from competitive auto racing for health reasons.

From 2021 to 2022, Alphand was the sporting director for the Silk Way Rally. He departed the position following the Russian invasion of Ukraine. Alphand became the Extreme E team principal for Veloce Racing in late 2022.

=== 24 Hours of Le Mans results ===
Year	Team	Co-Drivers	Car	Class	Laps	Pos.	Class Pos.
2001	(France) Warm-Up Luc Alphand Aventures (France) JMB Racing	(France) Michel Ligonnet (France) Luis Marques	Porsche 911 GT3-RS	GT	265	17th	8th
2002	(France) Luc Alphand Aventures	(France) Christian Lavieille (France) Olivier Thévenin	Porsche 911 GT3-RS	GT	299	24th	5th
2003	(France) Luc Alphand Aventures	(France) Jérôme Policand (France) Frédéric Dor	Ferrari 550-GTS Maranello	GTS	298	21st	5th
2004	(France) Luc Alphand Aventures	(France) Christian Lavieille (France) Philippe Almeras	Porsche 911 GT3-RS	GT	316	16th	5th
2005	(France) Luc Alphand Aventures	(France) Jérôme Policand (France) Christopher Campbell	Porsche 911 GT3-RS	GT2	311	18th	5th
2006	(France) Luc Alphand Aventures	(France) Patrice Goueslard (France) Jérôme Policand	Chevrolet Corvette C5-R	GT1	346	7th	3rd
2007	(France) Luc Alphand Aventures	(France) Patrice Goueslard (France) Jérôme Policand	Chevrolet Corvette C6.R	GT1	327	12th	7th
2008	(France) Luc Alphand Aventures	(France) Guillaume Moreau (France) Jérôme Policand	Chevrolet Corvette C6.R	GT1	335	17th	5th
2009	(France) Luc Alphand Aventures	(France) Stéphan Grégoire (France) Patrice Goueslard	Chevrolet Corvette C6.R	GT1	99	DNF	DNF

=== Dakar Rally results ===
Year	Class	Vehicle	Position	Stages won
1998	Car	(Japan) Mitsubishi	DNF	0
1999	Car	(Japan) Mitsubishi	16th	0
2000	Car	(France) Schlesser-Renault	DNF	0
2001	Car	(France) Schlesser-Renault	DNF	0
2002	Car	(Japan) Mitsubishi	7th	0
2003	Car	(Germany) BMW	9th	1
2004	Car	(Germany) BMW	4th	2
2005	Car	(Japan) Mitsubishi	2nd	1
2006	Car	(Japan) Mitsubishi	1st	2
2007	Car	(Japan) Mitsubishi	2nd	0
2008	Event cancelled – replaced by the 2008 Central Europe Rally			
2009	Car	(Japan) Mitsubishi	DNF	0

Sporting positions
Preceded by Stéphane Peterhansel	Dakar Rally; Car Winner; 2006	Succeeded by Stéphane Peterhansel
