= Anne Kristi Marken =

Norwegian cross-country skier

Anne Kristi Marken (born 23 January 1975) is a retired Norwegian cross-country skier.

She competed at the 1994 and 1995 Junior World Championships, managing a 21st -place finish as her best result.

She made her World Cup debut in March 1997 at the Holmenkollen ski festival, finishing 60th in the 30 km. She then became a sprinter, finishing 13th, 11th and 3rd in three World Cup sprints in December 1998.

She represented the sports club Eggedal IL. She is a twin sister of alpine skier Ingeborg Helen Marken.
