= 1996–97 FIS Alpine Ski World Cup =

International sports competition

FIS Alpine Ski World Cup 1996/97
Discipline	Men	Women
Overall	(France) Luc Alphand	(Sweden) Pernilla Wiberg
Downhill	(France) Luc Alphand	(Austria) Renate Götschl
Super G	(France) Luc Alphand	(Germany) Hilde Gerg
Giant Slalom	(Switzerland) Michael von Grünigen	(Italy) Deborah Compagnoni
Slalom	(Austria) Thomas Sykora	(Sweden) Pernilla Wiberg
Nations Cup	Austria	Germany
- Nations Cup overall: Austria

Competition
Locations	19	15
Individual	37	32

The 31st World Cup season began in October 1996 in Sölden, Austria, and concluded in March 1997 in the United States at the World Cup finals at Vail, Colorado. The overall winners were Luc Alphand of France and Pernilla Wiberg of Sweden, the only championship for each.

Alphand, who won by just 34 points, became the first male French overall winner in 29 years, since Jean-Claude Killy in 1968. After his overall victory, as well as discipline titles in both downhill (his third straight) and super-G (the only two events in which Alphand competed during the season), Alphand retired from international competition. Five-time overall World Cup champion Marc Girardelli of Luxembourg also retired during the season after suffering another knee injury during a race in December 1996.

A break in the schedule was for the World Championships, held 3–15 February in Sestriere, northwestern Italy.

== Calendar ==
=== Men ===
Event Key: DH – Downhill, SL – Slalom, GS – Giant Slalom, SG – Super Giant Slalom, KB – Combined
Race	Season	Date	Place	Type	Winner	Second	Third
896	1	27 October 1996	(Austria) Sölden	GS _{230}	(Switzerland) Steve Locher	(Switzerland) Michael von Grünigen	(Norway) Kjetil André Aamodt
897	2	24 November 1996	(United States) Park City	SL _{265}	(Austria) Thomas Sykora	(Austria) Thomas Stangassinger	(Norway) Kjetil André Aamodt
898	3	25 November 1996	(United States) Park City	GS _{231}	(Austria) Josef Strobl	(Austria) Hans Knauß	(Switzerland) Michael von Grünigen
899	4	30 November 1996	(United States) Breckenridge	GS _{232}	(Sweden) Fredrik Nyberg	(Switzerland) Urs Kälin	(Austria) Hans Knauß
900	5	1 December 1996	(United States) Breckenridge	SL _{266}	(Norway) Tom Stiansen	(Austria) Thomas Sykora	(Austria) Thomas Stangassinger
901	6	15 December 1996	(France) Val d'Isère	DH _{263}	(Austria) Fritz Strobl	(Austria) Werner Franz	(Austria) Patrick Ortlieb
902	7	16 December 1996	(France) Val d'Isère	SG _{069}	(Austria) Hans Knauß	(Austria) Günther Mader	(Switzerland) Steve Locher
903	8	17 December 1996	(Italy) Madonna di Campiglio	SL _{267}	(Austria) Thomas Sykora	(Italy) Alberto Tomba	(France) Sébastien Amiez
904	9	21 December 1996	(Italy) Val Gardena	DH _{264}	(France) Luc Alphand	(Norway) Atle Skårdal	(Italy) Kristian Ghedina
905	10	21 December 1996	(Italy) Val Gardena	DH _{265}	(Italy) Kristian Ghedina	(France) Luc Alphand	(Austria) Josef Strobl
906	11	22 December 1996	(Italy) Alta Badia	GS _{233}	(Switzerland) Michael von Grünigen	(Switzerland) Steve Locher	(Italy) Matteo Nana
907	12	29 December 1996	(Italy) Bormio	DH _{266}	(France) Luc Alphand	(Switzerland) William Besse	(Italy) Kristian Ghedina
908	13	5 January 1997	(Slovenia) Kranjska Gora	GS _{234}	(Switzerland) Michael von Grünigen	(Austria) Siegfried Voglreiter	(Norway) Kjetil André Aamodt
909	14	6 January 1997	(Slovenia) Kranjska Gora	SL _{268}	(Austria) Thomas Sykora	(France) Sébastien Amiez	(Austria) Thomas Stangassinger
910	15	11 January 1997	(France) Chamonix	DH _{267}	(Italy) Kristian Ghedina	(Norway) Atle Skårdal	(Austria) Werner Franz
911	16	12 January 1997	(France) Chamonix	SL _{269}	(Austria) Thomas Sykora	(Austria) Thomas Stangassinger	(Sweden) Martin Hansson
912	17	12 January 1997	(France) Chamonix	KB _{072}	(Austria) Günther Mader	(Norway) Kjetil André Aamodt	(Switzerland) Bruno Kernen
913	18	14 January 1997	(Switzerland) Adelboden	GS _{235}	(Norway) Kjetil André Aamodt	(Switzerland) Michael von Grünigen	(Austria) Andreas Schifferer
914	19	18 January 1997	(Switzerland) Wengen	DH _{268}	(Italy) Kristian Ghedina	(France) Luc Alphand	(Austria) Fritz Strobl
915	20	19 January 1997	(Switzerland) Wengen	SL _{270}	(Austria) Thomas Sykora	(Austria) Thomas Stangassinger	(France) Sébastien Amiez
916	21	24 January 1997	(Austria) Kitzbühel	DH _{269}	(France) Luc Alphand	(Austria) Werner Franz	(Switzerland) William Besse
917	22	25 January 1997	(Austria) Kitzbühel	DH _{270}	(Austria) Fritz Strobl	(Austria) Werner Franz	(France) Luc Alphand
918	23	26 January 1997	(Austria) Kitzbühel	SL _{271}	(Austria) Mario Reiter	(Italy) Alberto Tomba	(Norway) Finn Christian Jagge
919	24	26 January 1997	(Austria) Kitzbühel	KB _{073}	(Norway) Lasse Kjus	(Norway) Kjetil André Aamodt	(Austria) Werner Franz
920	25	29 January 1997	(Switzerland) Laax	SG _{070}	(France) Luc Alphand	(Austria) Josef Strobl	(Italy) Peter Runggaldier
921	26	30 January 1997	(Austria) Schladming	SL _{272}	(Italy) Alberto Tomba	(Austria) Thomas Stangassinger	(France) Sébastien Amiez
World Championships (3–15 February)
922	27	21 February 1997	(Germany) Garmisch-Partenkirchen	SG _{071}	(France) Luc Alphand	(Austria) Hermann Maier	(Italy) Werner Perathoner
923	28	22 February 1997	(Germany) Garmisch-Partenkirchen	DH _{271}	(France) Luc Alphand	(Italy) Pietro Vitalini	(Italy) Kristian Ghedina
924	29	23 February 1997	(Germany) Garmisch-Partenkirchen	SG _{072}	(Austria) Hermann Maier	(Italy) Kristian Ghedina	(Norway) Atle Skårdal (Norway) Lasse Kjus
925	30	2 March 1997	(Norway) Kvitfjell	DH _{272}	(Norway) Lasse Kjus	(Italy) Pietro Vitalini	(Canada) Ed Podivinsky
926	31	3 March 1997	(Norway) Kvitfjell	SG _{073}	(Austria) Josef Strobl	(Austria) Andreas Schifferer	(Norway) Lasse Kjus
927	32	8 March 1997	(Japan) Shiga Kōgen	GS _{236}	(Switzerland) Michael von Grünigen	(Austria) Andreas Schifferer	(Switzerland) Paul Accola
928	33	9 March 1997	(Japan) Shiga Kōgen	SL _{273}	(Austria) Thomas Stangassinger	(Norway) Finn Christian Jagge	(Norway) Ole Kristian Furuseth
929	34	12 March 1997	(United States) Vail	DH _{273}	(Austria) Fritz Strobl	(Italy) Kristian Ghedina	(Austria) Hannes Trinkl
930	35	13 March 1997	(United States) Vail	SG _{074}	(Austria) Andreas Schifferer	(Austria) Fritz Strobl	(Italy) Kristian Ghedina
931	36	15 March 1997	(United States) Vail	SL _{274}	(Norway) Finn Christian Jagge	(Austria) Thomas Stangassinger	(Italy) Alberto Tomba
932	37	15 March 1997	(United States) Vail	GS _{237}	(Switzerland) Michael von Grünigen	(Austria) Rainer Salzgeber	(Austria) Andreas Schifferer

=== Ladies ===
Event Key: DH – Downhill, SL – Slalom, GS – Giant Slalom, SG – Super Giant Slalom, KB – Combined
Race	Season	Date	Place	Type	Winner	Second	Third
836	1	26 October 1996	(Austria) Sölden	GS _{225}	(Germany) Katja Seizinger	(Italy) Deborah Compagnoni	(Germany) Hilde Gerg
837	2	21 November 1996	(United States) Park City	GS _{226}	(Italy) Sabina Panzanini	(Austria) Anita Wachter	(Germany) Katja Seizinger
838	3	23 November 1996	(United States) Park City	SL _{258}	(New Zealand) Claudia Riegler	(Sweden) Pernilla Wiberg	(Austria) Ingrid Salvenmoser
839	4	30 November 1996	(Canada) Lake Louise	DH _{223}	(Germany) Katja Seizinger	(France) Carole Montillet	(Sweden) Pernilla Wiberg
840	5	1 December 1996	(Canada) Lake Louise	SG _{070}	(Sweden) Pernilla Wiberg	(Germany) Hilde Gerg	(Russia) Varvara Zelenskaya
841	6	7 December 1996	(United States) Vail	DH _{224}	(Austria) Renate Götschl	(Germany) Katja Seizinger	(Italy) Isolde Kostner
842	7	7 December 1996	(United States) Vail	SG _{071}	(Russia) Svetlana Gladysheva	(Sweden) Pernilla Wiberg	(France) Carole Montillet
843	8	12 December 1996	(France) Val d'Isère	SG _{072}	(Germany) Hilde Gerg	(Germany) Katja Seizinger	(Italy) Isolde Kostner
844	9	21 December 1996	(Switzerland) Crans-Montana	SL _{259}	(New Zealand) Claudia Riegler	(Sweden) Pernilla Wiberg	(France) Patricia Chauvet
845	10	28 December 1996	(Austria) Semmering	SL _{260}	(Sweden) Pernilla Wiberg	(Italy) Deborah Compagnoni	(Austria) Anita Wachter
846	11	29 December 1996	(Austria) Semmering	SL _{261}	(Italy) Deborah Compagnoni	(France) Patricia Chauvet	(New Zealand) Claudia Riegler
847	12	3 January 1997	(Slovenia) Maribor	GS _{227}	(Italy) Sabina Panzanini	(Italy) Deborah Compagnoni (Austria) Anita Wachter	
848	13	4 January 1997	(Slovenia) Maribor	SL _{262}	(Sweden) Pernilla Wiberg	(Slovenia) Urška Hrovat	(Italy) Lara Magoni
849	14	11 January 1997	(Austria) Bad Kleinkirchheim	DH _{225}	(Switzerland) Heidi Zurbriggen	(Germany) Hilde Gerg	(Austria) Stefanie Schuster
850	15	12 January 1997	(Austria) Bad Kleinkirchheim	SG _{073}	(Sweden) Pernilla Wiberg	(Italy) Isolde Kostner	(Germany) Katja Seizinger
851	16	17 January 1997	(Germany) Zwiesel	GS _{228}	(Italy) Deborah Compagnoni	(Austria) Anita Wachter	(Sweden) Pernilla Wiberg
852	17	18 January 1997	(Germany) Zwiesel	GS _{229}	(Italy) Deborah Compagnoni	(Austria) Anita Wachter	(Germany) Katja Seizinger
853	18	19 January 1997	(Germany) Zwiesel	SL _{263}	(Sweden) Pernilla Wiberg	(Austria) Elfi Eder	(Italy) Deborah Compagnoni
854	19	23 January 1997	(Italy) Cortina d'Ampezzo	DH _{226}	(Italy) Isolde Kostner (Switzerland) Heidi Zurbriggen		(Germany) Katja Seizinger
855	20	25 January 1997	(Italy) Cortina d'Ampezzo	SG _{074}	(Italy) Isolde Kostner	(Sweden) Pernilla Wiberg	(Germany) Katja Seizinger
856	21	26 January 1997	(Italy) Cortina d'Ampezzo	GS _{230}	(Italy) Deborah Compagnoni	(Germany) Katja Seizinger	(Switzerland) Sonja Nef
857	22	1 February 1997	(Switzerland) Laax	DH _{227}	(Russia) Varvara Zelenskaya	(Austria) Renate Götschl (Switzerland) Heidi Zurbriggen	
858	23	2 February 1997	(Switzerland) Laax	SL _{264}	(New Zealand) Claudia Riegler	(Italy) Lara Magoni	(Switzerland) Martina Accola (Sweden) Pernilla Wiberg
859	24	2 February 1997	(Switzerland) Laax	KB _{063}	(Sweden) Pernilla Wiberg	(Germany) Hilde Gerg	(Austria) Anita Wachter
World Championships (3–15 February)
860	25	28 February 1997	(Japan) Hakuba	DH _{228}	(Russia) Varvara Zelenskaya	(United States) Hilary Lindh	(France) Carole Montillet
861	26	2 March 1997	(Japan) Hakuba	DH _{229}	(Russia) Varvara Zelenskaya	(Sweden) Pernilla Wiberg	(Austria) Renate Götschl
862	27	7 March 1997	(United States) Mammoth Mountain	SG _{075}	(Germany) Katja Seizinger	(Germany) Hilde Gerg	(Sweden) Pernilla Wiberg
863	28	7 March 1997	(United States) Mammoth Mountain	SL _{265}	(Sweden) Pernilla Wiberg	(Austria) Sabine Egger	(Italy) Lara Magoni
864	29	12 March 1997	(United States) Vail	DH _{230}	(Sweden) Pernilla Wiberg	(Austria) Renate Götschl (Germany) Katja Seizinger	
865	30	13 March 1997	(United States) Vail	SG _{076}	(Germany) Katja Seizinger	(Germany) Hilde Gerg	(Germany) Martina Ertl
866	31	15 March 1997	(United States) Vail	GS _{231}	(Italy) Deborah Compagnoni	(Germany) Katja Seizinger	(Switzerland) Karin Roten
867	32	16 March 1997	(United States) Vail	SL _{266}	(Italy) Lara Magoni (Sweden) Pernilla Wiberg		(Germany) Katja Seizinger

== Men ==
=== Overall ===
Place	Name	Country	Total
1	Luc Alphand	France	1130
2	Kjetil André Aamodt	Norway	1096
3	Josef Strobl	Austria	1021
4	Kristian Ghedina	Italy	990
5	Michael von Grünigen	Switzerland	867
6	Andreas Schifferer	Austria	781
7	Hans Knauss	Austria	756
8	Thomas Sykora	Austria	697
9	Thomas Stangassinger	Austria	670
10	Werner Franz	Austria	660

=== Downhill ===
Place	Name	Country	Total
1	Luc Alphand	France	779
2	Kristian Ghedina	Italy	700
3	Fritz Strobl	Austria	571
4	Werner Franz	Austria	517
5	Josef Strobl	Austria	470

=== Super G ===
Place	Name	Country	Total
1	Luc Alphand	France	351
2	Josef Strobl	Austria	333
3	Andreas Schifferer	Austria	256
4	Hermann Maier	Austria	230
5	Kristian Ghedina	Italy	218

=== Giant Slalom ===
Place	Name	Country	Total
1	Michael von Grünigen	Switzerland	660
2	Kjetil André Aamodt	Norway	387
3	Hans Knauss	Austria	349
4	Steve Locher	Switzerland	305
5	Fredrik Nyberg	Sweden	292

=== Slalom ===
Place	Name	Country	Total
1	Thomas Sykora	Austria	695
2	Thomas Stangassinger	Austria	670
3	Finn Christian Jagge	Norway	374
4	Sébastien Amiez	France	373
5	Alberto Tomba	Italy	352

=== Combined ===
Place	Name	Country	Total
1	Kjetil André Aamodt	Norway	160
2	Lasse Kjus	Norway	100
	Günther Mader	Austria	100
4	Paul Accola	Switzerland	90
5	Werner Franz	Austria	89

== Ladies ==
=== Overall ===
Place	Name	Country	Total
1	Pernilla Wiberg	Sweden	1960
2	Katja Seizinger	Germany	1424
3	Hilde Gerg	Germany	1150
4	Deborah Compagnoni	Italy	967
5	Isolde Kostner	Italy	833
6	Heidi Zurbriggen	Switzerland	785
7	Anita Wachter	Austria	741
8	Renate Götschl	Austria	647
9	Martina Ertl-Renz	Germany	620
10	Warwara Zelenskaja	Russia	604

=== Downhill ===
Place	Name	Country	Total
1	Renate Götschl	Austria	483
2	Heidi Zurbriggen	Switzerland	466
3	Varvara Zelenskaya	Russia	423
4	Pernilla Wiberg	Sweden	412
5	Katja Seizinger	Germany	405

=== Super G ===
Place	Name	Country	Total
1	Hilde Gerg	Germany	490
2	Katja Seizinger	Germany	474
3	Pernilla Wiberg	Sweden	449
4	Isolde Kostner	Italy	355
5	Martina Ertl	Germany	248

=== Giant Slalom ===
Place	Name	Country	Total
1	Deborah Compagnoni	Italy	560
2	Katja Seizinger	Germany	420
3	Anita Wachter	Austria	378
4	Karin Roten	Switzerland	258
5	Pernilla Wiberg	Sweden	229
	Sabina Panzanini	Italy	229

=== Slalom ===
Place	Name	Country	Total
1	Pernilla Wiberg	Sweden	770
2	Claudia Riegler	New Zealand	418
3	Deborah Compagnoni	Italy	407
4	Lara Magoni	Italy	391
5	Patricia Chauvet	France	347

=== Combined ===
Place	Name	Country	Total
1	Pernilla Wiberg	Sweden	100
2	Hilde Gerg	Germany	80
3	Anita Wachter	Austria	60
4	Sibylle Brauner	Germany	50
5	Catherine Borghi	Switzerland	45
