= 1997–98 FIS Alpine Ski World Cup =

International sports competition

FIS Alpine Ski World Cup 1997/98
Discipline	Men	Women
Overall	(Austria) Hermann Maier	(Germany) Katja Seizinger
Downhill	(Austria) Andreas Schifferer	(Germany) Katja Seizinger
Super G	(Austria) Hermann Maier	(Germany) Katja Seizinger
Giant Slalom	(Austria) Hermann Maier	(Germany) Martina Ertl
Slalom	(Austria) Thomas Sykora	(Sweden) Ylva Nowén
Nations Cup	Austria	Germany
- Nations Cup overall: Austria

Competition
Locations	18	12
Individual	37	33

The 32nd World Cup season began in October 1997 in Tignes, France, and concluded in March 1998 at the World Cup Finals in Crans-Montana, Switzerland. The overall winners were Hermann Maier of Austria, his first, and Katja Seizinger of Germany, her second.

A break in the schedule in February was for the Winter Olympics in Nagano, Japan.

== Calendar ==
=== Men ===
Event Key: DH – Downhill, SL – Slalom, GS – Giant Slalom, SG – Super Giant Slalom, KB – Combined, PS – Parallel Slalom
Race	Season	Date	Place	Type	Winner	Second	Third
933	1	24 October 1997	(France) Tignes	PS _{002}	(Austria) Josef Strobl	(Norway) Kjetil André Aamodt	(Austria) Hermann Maier
934	2	26 October 1997	(France) Tignes	GS _{238}	(Switzerland) Michael von Grünigen	(Switzerland) Steve Locher	(Austria) Hermann Maier
935	3	20 November 1997	(United States) Park City	GS _{239}	(Austria) Hermann Maier	(Norway) Kjetil André Aamodt	(Canada) Thomas Grandi
936	4	22 November 1997	(United States) Park City	SL _{275}	(Austria) Thomas Stangassinger	(Iceland) Kristinn Björnsson	(Norway) Finn Christian Jagge
937	5	4 December 1997	(United States) Beaver Creek	DH _{274}	(Italy) Kristian Ghedina	(France) Jean-Luc Crétier	(Norway) Lasse Kjus
938	6	5 December 1997	(United States) Beaver Creek	DH _{275}	(Austria) Andreas Schifferer	(Austria) Hermann Maier	(Austria) Stephan Eberharter
939	7	6 December 1997	(United States) Beaver Creek	SG _{075}	(Austria) Hermann Maier	(Austria) Stephan Eberharter	(Austria) Hans Knauß
940	8	14 December 1997	(France) Val d'Isère	GS _{240}	(Switzerland) Michael von Grünigen	(Austria) Stephan Eberharter	(Austria) Hans Knauß
941	9	15 December 1997	(Italy) Sestriere	SL _{276}	(Norway) Finn Christian Jagge	(Austria) Thomas Sykora	(Norway) Hans Petter Buraas
942	10	21 December 1997	(Italy) Alta Badia	GS _{241}	(Austria) Christian Mayer	(Switzerland) Michael von Grünigen	(Austria) Hermann Maier
943	11	29 December 1997	(Italy) Bormio	DH _{276}	(Austria) Hermann Maier	(Austria) Andreas Schifferer	(Austria) Werner Franz
944	12	30 December 1997	(Italy) Bormio	DH _{277}	(Austria) Andreas Schifferer	(Austria) Werner Franz	(Norway) Lasse Kjus
945	13	3 January 1998	(Slovenia) Kranjska Gora	GS _{242}	(Austria) Christian Mayer	(Austria) Hermann Maier	(Switzerland) Michael von Grünigen
946	14	4 January 1998	(Slovenia) Kranjska Gora	SL _{277}	(Austria) Thomas Sykora	(France) Pierrick Bourgeat	(Austria) Thomas Stangassinger
947	15	6 January 1998	(Austria) Saalbach	GS _{243}	(Austria) Hermann Maier	(Italy) Alberto Tomba	(Austria) Rainer Salzgeber
948	16	8 January 1998	(Austria) Schladming	SL _{278}	(Italy) Alberto Tomba	(Austria) Thomas Sykora	(Norway) Hans Petter Buraas
949	17	10 January 1998	(Austria) Schladming	SG _{076}	(Austria) Hermann Maier	(Austria) Stephan Eberharter	(Italy) Luca Cattaneo
950	18	11 January 1998	(Austria) Schladming	SG _{077}	(Austria) Hermann Maier	(Austria) Andreas Schifferer	(Austria) Stephan Eberharter
951	19	13 January 1998	(Switzerland) Adelboden	GS _{244}	(Austria) Hermann Maier	(Switzerland) Michael von Grünigen	(Switzerland) Paul Accola
952	20	16 January 1998	(Switzerland) Wengen	DH _{278}	(Austria) Hermann Maier	(France) Nicolas Burtin	(Austria) Andreas Schifferer
953	21	17 January 1998	(Switzerland) Wengen	DH _{279}	(Austria) Andreas Schifferer	(France) Jean-Luc Crétier	(Austria) Hermann Maier
954	22	18 January 1998	(Switzerland) Veysonnaz	SL _{279}	(Austria) Thomas Stangassinger	(Iceland) Kristinn Björnsson	(Japan) Kiminobu Kimura
955	23	16 January 1998; 18 January 1998	(Switzerland) Wengen (DH) (Switzerland) Veysonnaz (SL)	KB _{074}	(Austria) Hermann Maier	(Switzerland) Bruno Kernen	(Switzerland) Paul Accola
956	24	23 January 1998	(Austria) Kitzbühel	DH _{280}	(Switzerland) Didier Cuche	(France) Nicolas Burtin	(France) Jean-Luc Crétier
957	25	24 January 1998	(Austria) Kitzbühel	DH _{281}	(Italy) Kristian Ghedina	(Switzerland) Didier Cuche	(Austria) Josef Strobl
958	26	25 January 1998	(Austria) Kitzbühel	SL _{280}	(Austria) Thomas Stangassinger	(Austria) Thomas Sykora	(Norway) Ole Kristian Furuseth
959	27	25 January 1998	(Austria) Kitzbühel	KB _{075}	(Norway) Kjetil André Aamodt	(Austria) Werner Franz	(Canada) Ed Podivinsky
960	28	26 January 1998	(Austria) Kitzbühel	SL _{281}	(Austria) Thomas Sykora	(Norway) Hans Petter Buraas	(Austria) Thomas Stangassinger
961	29	31 January 1998	(Germany) Garmisch-Partenkirchen	DH _{282}	(Austria) Andreas Schifferer	(France) Nicolas Burtin	(Austria) Hermann Maier
962	30	1 February 1998	(Germany) Garmisch-Partenkirchen	SG _{078}	(Austria) Hermann Maier	(Austria) Hans Knauß	(Norway) Lasse Kjus
Winter Olympics (10–21 February)
963	31	28 February 1998	(South Korea) Yongpyong	GS _{245}	(Switzerland) Michael von Grünigen	(Austria) Christian Mayer	(Austria) Hermann Maier
964	32	1 March 1998	(South Korea) Yongpyong	SL _{282}	(Norway) Ole Kristian Furuseth	(Norway) Finn Christian Jagge	(Norway) Tom Stiansen
965	33	7 March 1998	(Norway) Kvitfjell	DH _{283}	(France) Nicolas Burtin	(Italy) Werner Perathoner	(Norway) Lasse Kjus (Austria) Josef Strobl
966	34	8 March 1998	(Norway) Kvitfjell	SG _{079}	(Austria) Hans Knauß	(Sweden) Patrik Järbyn	(Switzerland) Didier Cuche
967	35	13 March 1998	(Switzerland) Crans-Montana	DH _{284}	(Austria) Josef Strobl	(Switzerland) Didier Cuche	(Austria) Fritz Strobl
968	36	14 March 1998	(Switzerland) Crans-Montana	GS _{246}	(Austria) Stephan Eberharter	(Austria) Hans Knauß	(Austria) Hermann Maier
969	37	15 March 1998	(Switzerland) Crans-Montana	SL _{283}	(Italy) Alberto Tomba	(Norway) Hans Petter Buraas	(Norway) Finn Christian Jagge

=== Ladies ===
Event Key: DH – Downhill, SL – Slalom, GS – Giant Slalom, SG – Super Giant Slalom, KB – Combined, PS – Parallel Slalom
Race	Season	Date	Place	Type	Winner	Second	Third
868	1	24 October 1997	(France) Tignes	PS _{002}	(France) Leila Piccard	(Sweden) Ylva Nowén	(Austria) Alexandra Meissnitzer
869	2	25 October 1997	(France) Tignes	GS _{232}	(Italy) Deborah Compagnoni	(Germany) Martina Ertl	(Sweden) Martina Fortkord
870	3	21 November 1997	(United States) Park City	GS _{233}	(Italy) Deborah Compagnoni	(Austria) Alexandra Meissnitzer	(Norway) Andrine Flemmen
871	4	23 November 1997	(United States) Park City	SL _{267}	(Australia) Zali Steggall	(Sweden) Ylva Nowén	(New Zealand) Claudia Riegler
872	5	28 November 1997	(United States) Mammoth Mountain	PS _{003}	(Germany) Hilde Gerg	(Germany) Martina Ertl	(Austria) Alexandra Meissnitzer
873	6	29 November 1997	(United States) Mammoth Mountain	SG _{077}	(Germany) Katja Seizinger	(Italy) Isolde Kostner	(Germany) Katharina Gutensohn
874	7	4 December 1997	(Canada) Lake Louise	DH _{231}	(Germany) Katja Seizinger	(Germany) Katharina Gutensohn	(Austria) Renate Götschl
875	8	5 December 1997	(Canada) Lake Louise	DH _{232}	(Germany) Katja Seizinger	(France) Mélanie Suchet	(Italy) Isolde Kostner
876	9	6 December 1997	(Canada) Lake Louise	SG _{078}	(Germany) Katja Seizinger	(Germany) Hilde Gerg	(Italy) Isolde Kostner
877	10	17 December 1997	(France) Val d'Isère	DH _{233}	(Germany) Katja Seizinger	(Germany) Hilde Gerg	(Norway) Ingeborg Helen Marken
878	11	18 December 1997	(France) Val d'Isère	SG _{079}	(Germany) Katja Seizinger	(Austria) Renate Götschl	(Germany) Hilde Gerg
879	12	19 December 1997	(France) Val d'Isère	GS _{234}	(Italy) Deborah Compagnoni	(Austria) Alexandra Meissnitzer	(France) Leila Piccard
880	13	20 December 1997	(France) Val d'Isère	SL _{268}	(Sweden) Ylva Nowén	(Italy) Deborah Compagnoni	(Slovenia) Urška Hrovat
881	14	20 December 1997	(France) Val d'Isère	KB _{064}	(Germany) Hilde Gerg	(Germany) Katja Seizinger	(Germany) Martina Ertl
882	15	27 December 1997	(Austria) Lienz	SL _{269}	(Sweden) Ylva Nowén	(Italy) Deborah Compagnoni	(Slovenia) Urška Hrovat
883	16	28 December 1997	(Austria) Lienz	SL _{270}	(Sweden) Ylva Nowén	(United States) Kristina Koznick	(Italy) Deborah Compagnoni
884	17	5 January 1998	(Italy) Bormio	SL _{271}	(Sweden) Ylva Nowén	(Germany) Hilde Gerg	(Slovenia) Špela Pretnar
885	18	6 January 1998	(Italy) Bormio	GS _{235}	(Italy) Deborah Compagnoni	(Germany) Martina Ertl	(Austria) Alexandra Meissnitzer
886	19	10 January 1998	(Italy) Bormio	GS _{236}	(Germany) Martina Ertl	(Germany) Katja Seizinger	(Italy) Deborah Compagnoni
887	20	11 January 1998	(Italy) Bormio	SL _{272}	(Germany) Hilde Gerg	(United States) Kristina Koznick	(Slovenia) Špela Pretnar
888	21	18 January 1998	(Austria) Altenmarkt	DH _{234}	(Austria) Renate Götschl	(Germany) Katja Seizinger	(Austria) Alexandra Meissnitzer
889	22	18 January 1998	(Austria) Altenmarkt	SG _{080}	(Germany) Martina Ertl	(Switzerland) Heidi Zurbriggen	(France) Mélanie Suchet
890	23	22 January 1998	(Italy) Cortina d'Ampezzo	DH _{235}	(Italy) Isolde Kostner	(Austria) Renate Götschl	(France) Florence Masnada
891	24	23 January 1998	(Italy) Cortina d'Ampezzo	SG _{081}	(France) Mélanie Suchet	(Germany) Regina Häusl	(Italy) Karen Putzer
892	25	24 January 1998	(Italy) Cortina d'Ampezzo	SG _{082}	(Germany) Katja Seizinger	(Austria) Renate Götschl	(Italy) Isolde Kostner
893	26	25 January 1998	(Italy) Cortina d'Ampezzo	GS _{237}	(Germany) Martina Ertl	(Germany) Katja Seizinger	(France) Sophie Lefranc-Duvillard
894	27	28 January 1998	(Sweden) Åre	GS _{238}	(Germany) Martina Ertl	(Switzerland) Sonja Nef	(Sweden) Anna Ottosson
895	28	29 January 1998	(Sweden) Åre	SL _{273}	(United States) Kristina Koznick	(Germany) Hilde Gerg	(Austria) Sabine Egger
896	29	31 January 1998	(Sweden) Åre	DH _{236}	(Germany) Katja Seizinger	(Austria) Renate Götschl	(France) Florence Masnada
897	30	31 January 1998	(Sweden) Åre	KB _{065}	(Germany) Hilde Gerg	(Germany) Martina Ertl	(Germany) Katja Seizinger
Winter Olympics (10–21 February)
898	31	1 March 1998	(Austria) Saalbach	SL _{274}	(Germany) Martina Ertl	(Norway) Trine Bakke	(United States) Kristina Koznick
899	32	14 March 1998	(Switzerland) Crans-Montana	SL _{275}	(Slovenia) Urška Hrovat	(Germany) Martina Ertl	(Germany) Hilde Gerg
900	33	15 March 1998	(Switzerland) Crans-Montana	GS _{239}	(Austria) Alexandra Meissnitzer	(Germany) Martina Ertl	(Italy) Deborah Compagnoni

== Men ==
=== Overall ===
Place	Name	Country	Total
1	Hermann Maier	Austria	1685
2	Andreas Schifferer	Austria	1114
3	Stephan Eberharter	Austria	1030
4	Kjetil André Aamodt	Norway	901
5	Hans Knauss	Austria	888
6	Michael von Grünigen	Switzerland	746
7	Josef Strobl	Austria	697
8	Didier Cuche	Switzerland	627
9	Christian Mayer	Austria	590
10	Lasse Kjus	Norway	578

=== Downhill ===
Place	Name	Country	Total
1	Andreas Schifferer	Austria	655
2	Hermann Maier	Austria	479
3	Nicolas Burtin	France	469
4	Didier Cuche	Switzerland	424
5	Jean-Luc Cretier	France	414

=== Super G ===
Place	Name	Country	Total
1	Hermann Maier	Austria	400
2	Hans Knauss	Austria	256
3	Stephan Eberharter	Austria	220
4	Patrik Järbyn	Sweden	195
5	Andreas Schifferer	Austria	185

=== Giant Slalom ===
Place	Name	Country	Total
1	Hermann Maier	Austria	620
2	Michael von Grünigen	Switzerland	560
3	Christian Mayer	Austria	429
4	Stephan Eberharter	Austria	388
5	Hans Knauss	Austria	375

=== Slalom ===
Place	Name	Country	Total
1	Thomas Sykora	Austria	521
2	Thomas Stangassinger	Austria	517
3	Hans Petter Buraas	Norway	420
4	Finn Christian Jagge	Norway	345
5	Kiminobu Kimura	Japan	316

=== Combined ===
Place	Name	Country	Total
1	Werner Franz	Austria	120
2	Hermann Maier	Austria	100
	Kjetil André Aamodt	Norway	100
4	Bruno Kernen	Switzerland	80
5	Paul Accola	Switzerland	60
	Ed Podivinsky	Canada	60

== Ladies ==
=== Overall ===
Place	Name	Country	Total
1	Katja Seizinger	Germany	1655
2	Martina Ertl	Germany	1508
3	Hilde Gerg	Germany	1391
4	Deborah Compagnoni	Italy	912
5	Alexandra Meissnitzer	Austria	884
6	Ylva Nowén	Sweden	815
7	Renate Götschl	Austria	787
8	Isolde Kostner	Italy	695
9	Urška Hrovat	Slovenia	592
10	Heidi Zurbriggen	Switzerland	561

=== Downhill ===
Place	Name	Country	Total
1	Katja Seizinger	Germany	520
2	Renate Götschl	Austria	392
3	Isolde Kostner	Italy	292
4	Melanie Suchet	France	237
5	Hilde Gerg	Germany	224

=== Super G ===
Place	Name	Country	Total
1	Katja Seizinger	Germany	445
2	Renate Götschl	Austria	305
3	Isolde Kostner	Italy	266
4	Martina Ertl	Germany	259
5	Melanie Suchet	France	228

=== Giant Slalom ===
Place	Name	Country	Total
1	Martina Ertl	Germany	591
2	Deborah Compagnoni	Italy	565
3	Alexandra Meissnitzer	Austria	445
4	Sonja Nef	Switzerland	359
5	Andrine Flemmen	Norway	296
6	Katja Seizinger	Germany	295

=== Slalom ===
Place	Name	Country	Total
1	Ylva Nowén	Sweden	620
2	Kristina Koznick	United States	560
3	Hilde Gerg	Germany	451
4	Urska Hrovat	Slovenia	423
5	Martina Ertl	Germany	320

=== Combined ===
Place	Name	Country	Total
1	Hilde Gerg	Germany	200
2	Katja Seizinger	Germany	140
	Martina Ertl	Germany	140
4	Morena Gallizio	Italy	77
5	Florence Masnada	France	76
