= Sébastien Amiez =

French alpine skier (born 1972)

Personal information
- Born: 6 May 1972 (age 54) Moûtiers, Savoie, France
- Children: Steven Amiez

Skiing career
- Country: France
- Sport: Alpine skiing
- Club: S.C. Pralognan
- Retired: January 2006 (age 33)
- Disciplines: Slalom, giant slalom
- World Cup debut: 20 December 1993 (age 21)

Olympics
- Teams: 3 – (1994, 1998, 2002)
- Medals: 1 (0 gold)

World Championships
- Teams: 6 – (1996–2005)
- Medals: 1 (0 gold)

World Cup
- Seasons: 13 – (1994–2006)
- Wins: 1 – (1 SL)
- Podiums: 10 – (10 SL)
- Overall titles: 0 – (11th in 1996)
- Discipline titles: 1 – (SL – 1996)
Medal record
Men's alpine skiing
Representing France
Olympic Games
| Silver medal – second place | 2002 Salt Lake City | Slalom |
World Championships
| Silver medal – second place | 1997 Sestriere | Slalom |

Sébastien Amiez (born 6 May 1972) is a French former alpine skier. He won the season title for slalom for the 1995–96 World Cup season as well as silver medals at the 2002 Winter Olympics and 1997 World Championships.

His son, Steven Amiez, is also a World Cup ski racer and Olympian.

== World Cup results ==
=== Season titles ===
1 title (1 Slalom)

Season
| Season | Discipline |
| 1996 | Slalom |

=== Season standings ===
Season
| Season | Age | Overall | Slalom | Giant slalom | Super-G | Downhill | Combined | Parallel |
| 1994 | 21 | 70 | 22 | — | — | — | — | —N/a |
| 1995 | 22 | 29 | 8 | — | — | — | — | —N/a |
| 1996 | 23 | 11 | 1st place, gold medalist(s) | — | — | — | — | —N/a |
| 1997 | 24 | 18 | 4 | 35 | — | — | — | —N/a |
| 1998 | 25 | 48 | 18 | 54 | — | — | — | 15 |
| 1999 | 26 | 24 | 6 | — | — | — | — | —N/a |
| 2000 | 27 | 40 | 13 | 50 | — | — | — | —N/a |
| 2001 | 28 | 39 | 13 | — | — | — | — | —N/a |
| 2002 | 29 | 45 | 12 | — | — | — | — | —N/a |
| 2003 | 30 | 66 | 24 | — | — | — | — | —N/a |
| 2004 | 31 | 81 | 32 | — | — | — | — | —N/a |
| 2005 | 32 | 134 | 53 | — | — | — | — | —N/a |

=== Race podiums ===
- 1 win – (1 SL)
- 10 podiums – (10 SL), 46 top tens

Season
| Season | Date | Location | Discipline | Place |
| 1996 | 19 November 1995 | Beaver Creek, United States | Slalom | 2nd |
| 1996 | 22 December 1995 | Kranjska Gora, Slovenia | Slalom | 3rd |
| 1996 | 21 January 1996 | Veysonnaz, Switzerland | Slalom | 1st |
| 1996 | 10 March 1996 | Hafjell, Norway | Slalom | 2nd |
| 1997 | 17 December 1996 | Madonna di Campiglio, Italy | Slalom | 3rd |
| 1997 | 6 January 1997 | Kranjska Gora, Slovenia | Slalom | 2nd |
| 1997 | 19 January 1997 | Wengen, Switzerland | Slalom | 3rd |
| 1997 | 30 January 1997 | Schladming, Austria | Slalom | 3rd |
| 1999 | 28 November 1998 | Aspen, United States | Slalom | 2nd |
| 2001 | 11 March 2001 | Åre, Sweden | Slalom | 3rd |

== World Championship results ==
Year
| Year | Age | Slalom | Giant slalom | Super-G | Downhill | Combined |
| 1996 | 23 | 6 | — | — | — | — |
| 1997 | 24 | 2nd place, silver medalist(s) | — | — | — | — |
| 1999 | 26 | 11 | — | — | — | — |
| 2001 | 28 | 12 | — | — | — | — |
| 2003 | 30 | 31 | — | — | — | — |
| 2005 | 32 | DNF1 | — | — | — | — |

== Olympic results ==
Year
| Year | Age | Slalom | Giant slalom | Super-G | Downhill | Combined |
| 1994 | 21 | DNF2 | — | — | — | — |
| 1998 | 25 | 14 | — | — | — | — |
| 2002 | 29 | 2nd place, silver medalist(s) | — | — | — | — |
