= Michael von Grünigen =

Swiss alpine skier

Personal information
- Born: 11 April 1969 (age 57) Schönried, Bern, Switzerland

Skiing career
- Sport: Alpine skiing
- Retired: 2003
- Disciplines: Technical events
- World Cup debut: 1993

World Cup
- Seasons: 11
- Wins: 23
- Podiums: 48
- Overall titles: 0
- Discipline titles: 4
Medal record
Men's alpine skiing
Representing Switzerland
World Cup race podiums
Event	1st	2nd	3rd
Giant slalom	23	14	9
Slalom	0	2	0
Total	23	16	9
Olympic Games
Bronze medal – third place	1998 Nagano	Giant slalom
World Championships
Gold medal – first place	1997 Sestrière	Giant slalom
Gold medal – first place	2001 St. Anton	Giant slalom
Bronze medal – third place	1996 Sierra Nevada	Giant slalom
Bronze medal – third place	1996 Sierra Nevada	Slalom

Michael von Grünigen (born 11 April 1969) is a Swiss former alpine skier. He is considered to be the most successful Giant slalom skier of his era: In 1996, 1997, 1999 and 2003, he won the World Cup in Giant slalom. In 1997 and 2001, he was World Champion in giant slalom. He took a total of 23 World Cup wins during his career. Having originally announced his retirement at the 2002 Winter Olympics in Salt Lake City, after failing to medal at the Games he elected to delay his retirement for a year, ending his competitive career in 2003.

== Biography ==
Von Grünigen is originally from the Bernese Highlands of Switzerland, and comes from a skiing family: his parents were both ski instructors, and one of his three sisters is fellow alpine skier Christine von Grünigen. He is married to Anna, and the couple have three children: Noel, Elio and Lian. Since retiring from competition, he has worked in a number of roles with his equipment sponsor, Fischer, and also works with young skiers for the Swiss Ski Federation.

== World Cup victories ==
=== World Cups ===
Season	Discipline
1996	Giant slalom Cup
1997	Giant slalom Cup
1999	Giant slalom Cup
2003	Giant slalom Cup

=== Individual races ===
Date	Location	Race
19 January 1993	(Switzerland) Veysonnaz	Giant slalom
18 December 1994	(France) Val d'Isère	Giant slalom
12 November 1995	(France) Tignes	Giant slalom
17 November 1995	(United States) Vail	Giant slalom
25 November 1995	(United States) Park City	Giant slalom
19 January 1996	(Switzerland) Adelboden	Giant slalom
10 February 1996	(Austria) Hinterstoder	Giant slalom
22 December 1996	(Italy) Alta Badia	Giant slalom
5 January 1997	(Slovenia) Kranjska Gora	Giant slalom
8 March 1997	(Japan) Nagano	Giant slalom
15 March 1997	(United States) Vail	Giant slalom
26 October 1997	(France) Tignes	Giant slalom
14 December 1997	(France) Val d'Isère	Giant slalom
28 February 1998	(South Korea) Yongpyong	Giant slalom
20 December 1998	(Italy) Alta Badia	Giant slalom
14 March 1999	(Spain) Sierra Nevada	Giant slalom
17 November 2000	(United States) Park City	Giant slalom
17 December 2000	(France) Val d'Isère	Giant slalom
6 January 2001	(France) Les Arcs	Giant slalom
10 March 2002	(Austria) Flachau	Giant slalom
22 November 2002	(United States) Park City	Giant slalom
15 December 2002	(France) Val d'Isère	Giant slalom
1 March 2003	(South Korea) Yongpyong	Giant slalom

Awards
Preceded by (Switzerland) Donghua Li	Swiss Sportsman of the Year; 1997	Succeeded by (Switzerland) Oscar Camenzind
