= Thomas Sykora =

Austrian alpine skier

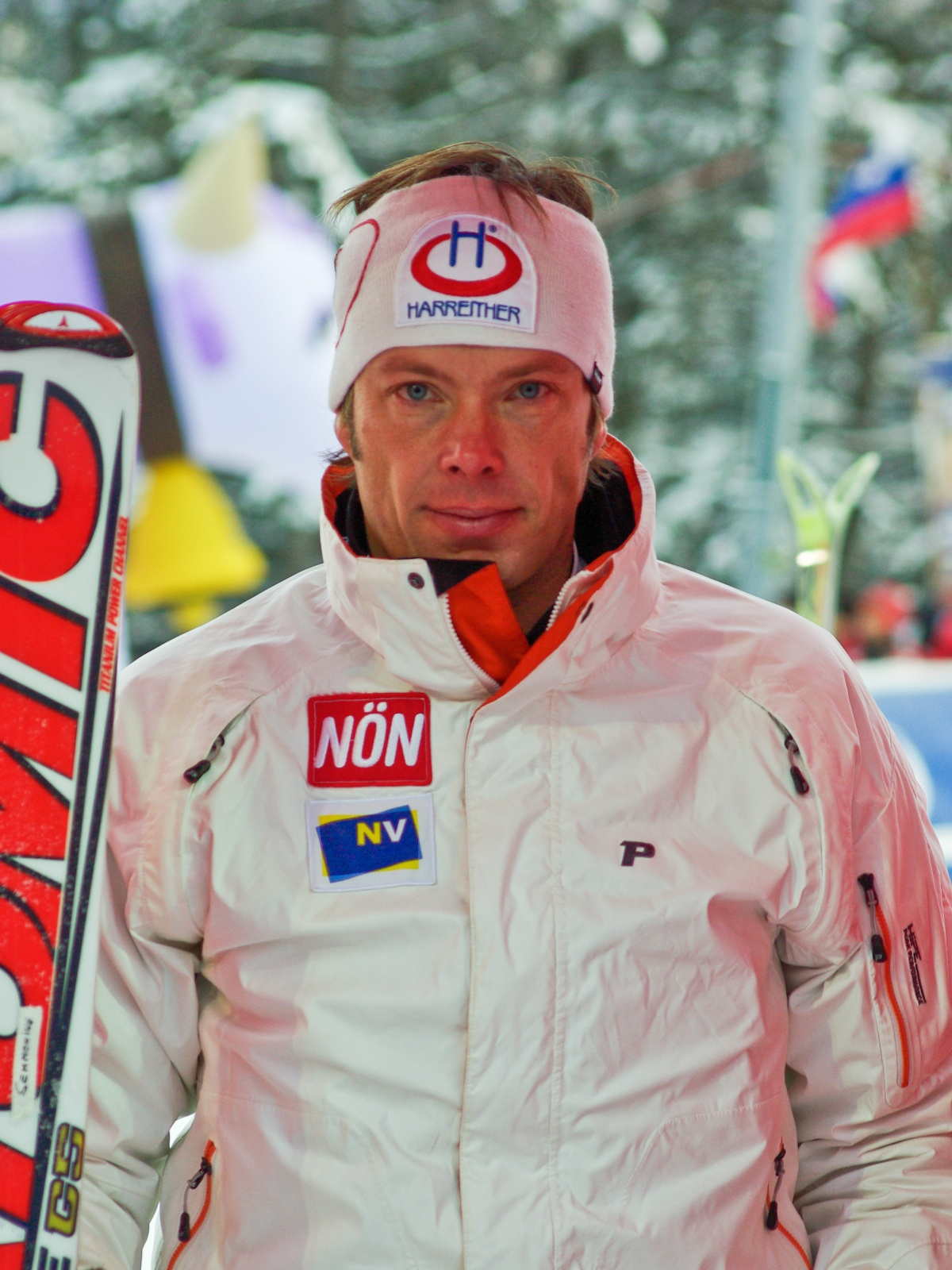

Personal information
- Born: 18 May 1968 (age 58) Tulln, Austria

Skiing career
- Sport: Alpine skiing
- Disciplines: Slalom
- World Cup debut: 30 November 1991

Olympics
- Teams: 1
- Medals: 1

World Championships
- Teams: 3

World Cup
- Wins: 9
- Podiums: 21
- Discipline titles: 2
Medal record
Men's alpine skiing
Representing Austria
Olympic Games
Bronze medal – third place	1998 Nagano	Slalom

Thomas Sykora (born 18 May 1968) is a former alpine skier from Austria.

== Biography ==
Thomas comes from a sporting family: his father Ernst Sykora was a ski instructor, and his aunts Liese Prokop and Maria Sykora were both successful athletes. He competed at the 1994 Winter Olympics and the 1998 Winter Olympics, winning a bronze medal at the latter.

Sykora won the 1996/97 and 1997/98 Slalom World Cups. Before winning these 2 World Cups, he finished second of the competition in 1994 in Lech. After finishing first in the first round, he eventually was beaten by Alberto Tomba by 2 hundredths of a second after the second round. In total, Thomas won nine World Cup races. At the 1998 Olympic Winter Games in Nagano, he won the bronze medal in slalom. In 1996 and 1999 he also became Austrian slalom champion.

After numerous knee injuries, Thomas Sykora was forced to quit his career and became an ORF commentator. He started commenting on women's races in 2000. Later, he served as commentator in important men's slaloms (Kitzbühel, Schladming). On most of the races he comments, Thomas wears a helmet with a camera to show the spectators the different routes of the slalom, and their difficulties.

After the end of his active career as an athlete, he decided to study mental coaching in Bregenz; he then graduated with an MBA.

== World Cup victories ==
=== Overall results ===
Season	Discipline
1997	Slalom
1998	Slalom

=== Individual victories ===
Date	Location	Race
14 January 1996	(Austria) Kitzbühel	Slalom
10 March 1996	(Norway) Hafjell	Slalom
24 November 1996	(United States) Park City	Slalom
17 December 1996	(Italy) Madonna di Campiglio	Slalom
6 January 1997	(Slovenia) Kranjska Gora	Slalom
12 January 1997	(France) Chamonix	Slalom
19 January 1997	(Switzerland) Wengen	Slalom
4 January 1998	(Slovenia) Kranjska Gora	Slalom
26 January 1998	(Austria) Kitzbühel	Slalom
