= FIS Alpine World Ski Championships 1997 =

Skiing event in Sestriere, Italy

- Host city: Sestriere
- Country: Italy
- Events: 10
- Opening: 3 February 1997
- Closing: 15 February 1997
- Opened by: Oscar Luigi Scalfaro

The FIS Alpine World Ski Championships 1997 were held in Sestriere, northwestern Italy, from February 3–15, 1997.

Nine years later, the area would later host the alpine events for the 2006 Winter Olympics in Turin.

== Men's competitions ==
=== Downhill ===
Date: February 8

Placing	Country	Athlete	Time
1	(Switzerland)	Bruno Kernen	1:51.11
2	(Norway)	Lasse Kjus	1:51.18
3	(Italy)	Kristian Ghedina	1:51.46

=== Super-G ===
Date: February 3

Placing	Country	Athlete	Time
1	(Norway)	Atle Skårdal	1:29.68
2	(Norway)	Lasse Kjus	1:29.89
3	(Austria)	Günther Mader	1:30.01

=== Giant Slalom ===
Date: February 12

Placing	Country	Athlete	Time	Run 1	Run 2
1	(Switzerland)	Michael von Grünigen	2:48.23	1:23.31	1:24.92
2	(Norway)	Lasse Kjus	2:49.35	1:24.59	1:24.76
3	(Austria)	Andreas Schifferer	2:49.68	1:25.05	1:24.63

=== Slalom ===
Date: February 15

Placing	Country	Athlete	Time	Run 1	Run 2
1	(Norway)	Tom Stiansen	1:51.70	55.81	55.89
2	(France)	Sébastien Amiez	1:51.75	54.71	57.04
3	(Italy)	Alberto Tomba	1:52.14	56.21	55.93

=== Combination ===
Date: February 6

Placing	Country	Athlete	Time	Downhill	Slalom
1	(Norway)	Kjetil André Aamodt	3:10.40	1:37.37	1:33.03
2	(Switzerland)	Bruno Kernen	3:10.68	1:37.62	1:33.06
3	(Austria)	Mario Reiter	3:11.69	1:39.67	1:32.02

== Women's competitions ==
=== Downhill ===
Date: February 15

Placing	Country	Athlete	Time
1	(United States)	Hilary Lindh	1:41.18
2	(Switzerland)	Heidi Zurbriggen	1:41.24
3	(Sweden)	Pernilla Wiberg	1:41.44

=== Super-G ===
Date: February 11

Placing	Country	Athlete	Time
1	(Italy)	Isolde Kostner	1:23.50
2	(Germany)	Katja Seizinger	1:23.58
3	(Germany)	Hilde Gerg	1:23.64

=== Giant Slalom ===
Date: February 9

Placing	Country	Athlete	Time	Run 1	Run 2
1	(Italy)	Deborah Compagnoni	2:39.19	1:17.64	1:21.55
2	(Switzerland)	Karin Roten	2:39.99	1:18.37	1.21.62
3	(France)	Leila Piccard	2:40.95	1:19.58	1:21.37

=== Slalom ===
Date: February 5

Placing	Country	Athlete	Time	Run 1	Run 2
1	(Italy)	Deborah Compagnoni	1:43.88	52.67	51.21
2	(Italy)	Lara Magoni	1:45.15	53.08	52.07
3	(Switzerland)	Karin Roten	1:45.48	52.62	52.86

=== Combination ===
Date: February 15

Placing	Country	Athlete	Time	Slalom	Downhill
1	(Austria)	Renate Götschl	3:03.38	1:28.75	1:34.63
2	(Germany)	Katja Seizinger	3:03.42	1:28.27	1:35.15
3	(Germany)	Hilde Gerg	3:03.46	1:28.22	1:35.24

== Medals table ==
Place	Nation	Gold	Silver	Bronze	Total
1	Norway	3	3	-	6
2	Italy	3	1	2	6
3	Switzerland	2	3	1	6
4	Austria	1	-	3	4
5	United States	1	-	-	1
6	Germany	-	2	2	4
7	France	-	1	1	2
8	Sweden	-	-	1	1
