= Ingeborg Helen Marken =

Norwegian alpine skier (born 1975)

Ingeborg Helen Marken (born 23 January 1975) is a Norwegian alpine skier, born in Kongsberg. She competed at the Winter Olympics in Nagano in 1998, and in Salt Lake City in 2002.

She was Norwegian champion in giant slalom and in alpine combined in 1995, in Super-G in 1997 and 1998, and in downhill in 2000 and 2002.

She represented the sports club Eggedal IL. She is a twin sister of cross-country skier Anne Kristi Marken.
