= Deborah Compagnoni =

Italian alpine skier (born 1970)

Deborah Compagnoni Golden Collar of Sports Merit
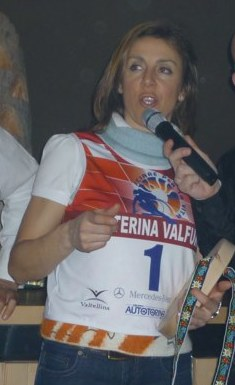
- Compagnoni in March 2010

Personal information
- Born: 4 June 1970 (age 56) Bormio, Italy
- Height: 165 cm (5 ft 5 in)

Skiing career
- Sport: Alpine skiing
- Retired: 1999
- World Cup debut: 1986

Olympics
- Medals: 4 (3 gold)

World Championships
- Medals: 3 (3 gold)

World Cup
- Seasons: 14
- Wins: 16
- Podiums: 44
- Overall titles: 0 (4th 1998 & 1999)
- Discipline titles: 1 (Gs 1997)
Medal record
International alpine ski competitions
| Event | 1st | 2nd | 3rd |
|---|---|---|---|
| Olympic Games | 3 | 1 | 0 |
| World Championships | 3 | 0 | 0 |
| Total | 6 | 1 | 0 |
World Cup race podiums
| Event | 1st | 2nd | 3rd |
|---|---|---|---|
| Super-G | 2 | 0 | 1 |
| Giant | 13 | 10 | 8 |
| Slalom | 1 | 5 | 4 |
| Total | 16 | 15 | 13 |
Olympic Games
| Gold medal – first place | 1992 Albertville | Super-G |
| Gold medal – first place | 1994 Lillehammer | Giant slalom |
| Gold medal – first place | 1998 Nagano | Giant slalom |
| Silver medal – second place | 1998 Nagano | Slalom |
World Championships
| Gold medal – first place | 1996 Sierra Nevada | Giant slalom |
| Gold medal – first place | 1997 Sestrière | Giant slalom |
| Gold medal – first place | 1997 Sestrière | Slalom |

Deborah Compagnoni Golden Collar of Sports Merit (born 4 June 1970) is an Italian former Alpine skier who won three gold medals at the 1992, 1994, and 1998 Winter Olympics.

== Biography ==
Compagnoni was born in Bormio, northern Lombardy, and skied with the G.S. Forestale club.

She soon attracted attention for her great talent. Her career was always marked by major successes, but also by serious accidents. After her first major victory, the World Junior title in giant slalom, and her first podium in World Cup, she broke her right knee in the Val d'Isère downhill. After surgery, she decided to stop competing in downhill races, where her talent could have permitted even greater successes than those she obtained in her still outstanding career.

Compagnoni won her first race in the World Cup in 1992. She also won the gold medal at the Winter Olympics of the same year, again in the super-G; however, while racing the giant slalom one day later, she destroyed her left knee.

In the following years, she left the speed disciplines (downhill and Super-G), confirming herself as one of the best giant slalom specialists. Her fragile knees hindered Compagnoni's practice activity, and limited the number of victories in the World Cup; however, she always arrived in her best shape for the major championships. In 1994, at the Lillehammer Olympics, she won the gold medal in the giant slalom, a feat she repeated four years later in Nagano. In 1998, she won also a silver medal in the Slalom, finishing second by only 0.06 seconds.

Compagnoni won the World Championship in giant slalom in 1996; in the following year's edition, she repeated the victory, alongside winning with the slalom title, a feat never accomplished by any other Italian female skier. She won a total of 16 races in the Alpine Skiing World Cup (13 giant slalom, two super-G, and one slalom), plus a giant slalom World Cup in 1997.

Deborah Compagnoni is a famous Italian female skier, the equal of famous male champions like Gustav Thöni and Alberto Tomba. The World Cup skiing track in her native Santa Caterina Valfurva has been named after her.

At the 2026 Milano Cortina Winter Olympics opening ceremony, she was one of the three last torch bearers, lighting the Milan Olympic cauldron alongside Alberto Tomba.

She was married to Alessandro Benetton, and they have three children: Agnese, Tobias, and Luce; they lived in Ponzano Veneto, Italy. They separated in 2021. Her brother Jacopo Compagnoni, a fellow Alpine skier, died during an avalanche on Monte Sobretta on 16 December 2021, at the age of 40.

== World Cup results ==
=== Season titles ===
| Season | Discipline |
|---|---|
| 1996–97 | Giant slalom |

=== Season standings ===
| Season | Overall | | Downhill | | Super-G | | Giant slalom | | Slalom | | Combined | |
| Season | Place | Points | Place | Points | Place | Points | Place | Points | Place | Points | Place | Points |
|---|---|---|---|---|---|---|---|---|---|---|---|---|
| 1987‍–‍88 | 40. | 24 | 22. | 12 | 17. | 12 | – | – | – | – | – | – |
| 1988–89 | Did not participate due to injury. | | | | | | | | | | | |
| 1989–90 | 52. | 19 | – | – | 22. | 9 | 24. | 10 | – | – | – | – |
| 1990–91 | 57. | 12 | – | – | – | – | 17. | 12 | – | – | – | – |
| 1991–92 | 11. | 590 | – | – | 15. | 126 | 4. | 344 | 19. | 120 | – | – |
| 1992–93 | 11. | 535 | – | – | 6. | 230 | 8. | 200 | 17. | 105 | – | – |
| 1993–94 | 6. | 841 | – | – | 18. | 91 | 3. | 515 | 12. | 195 | 12. | 40 |
| 1994–95 | 12. | 524 | – | – | 25. | 74 | 5. | 325 | 14. | 125 | – | – |
| 1995–96 | 22. | 346 | – | – | – | – | 6. | 280 | 30. | 66 | – | – |
| 1996–97 | 4. | 967 | – | – | – | – | 1. | 560 | 3. | 407 | – | – |
| 1997–98 | 4. | 912 | – | – | – | – | 2. | 565 | 6. | 304 | – | – |
| 1998–99 | 22. | 347 | – | – | – | – | 9. | 256 | 23. | 91 | – | – |

=== Race victories ===
These are Compagnoni's World Cup victories.

| Season | Date | Location | Race |
|---|---|---|---|
| 1991–92 | 26 January 1992 | Morzine | Super-G |
| 1992–93 | 7 March 1993 | Morzine | Super-G |
| 1993–94 | 5 December 1993 | Tignes | Giant slalom |
| 1993–94 | 11 December 1993 | Veysonnaz | Giant slalom |
| 1993–94 | 5 January 1994 | Morzine | Giant slalom |
| 1994–95 | 8 January 1995 | Haus im Ennstal | Giant slalom |
| 1995–96 | 2 March 1996 | Narvik | Giant slalom |
| 1996–97 | 29 December 1996 | Semmering | Slalom |
| 1996–97 | 17 January 1997 | Zwiesel | Giant slalom |
| 1996–97 | 18 January 1997 | Zwiesel | Giant slalom |
| 1996–97 | 26 January 1997 | Cortina d'Ampezzo | Giant slalom |
| 1996–97 | 15 March 1997 | Vail | Giant slalom |
| 1997–98 | 25 October 1997 | Tignes | Giant slalom |
| 1997–98 | 21 November 1997 | Park City | Giant slalom |
| 1997–98 | 19 December 1997 | Val-d'Isère | Giant slalom |
| 1997–98 | 6 January 1998 | Bormio | Giant slalom |

== Honours ==
=== Orders ===
- CONI: Golden Collar of Sports Merit Collare d'Oro al Merito Sportivo - 1996

== See also ==
- List of multiple Winter Olympic medalists
- Italian sportswomen multiple medalists at Olympics and World Championships
- Italian skiers who closed in top 10 in overall World Cup
- List of FIS Alpine Ski World Cup women's race winners

Olympic Games
| Preceded by Teddy Riner and Marie-José Pérec | Final Olympic torchbearer Milano Cortina 2026 alongside Sofia Goggia and Alberto Tomba | Succeeded by TBD 2028 |
| Preceded by Dinigeer Yilamujiang and Zhao Jiawen | Final Winter Olympic torchbearer Milano Cortina 2026 alongside Sofia Goggia and Alberto Tomba | Succeeded by TBD 2030 |

Awards
| Preceded by Fiona May | Italian Sportswoman of the Year; 1996-1997-1998 | Succeeded by Stefania Belmondo |
Winter Olympics
| Preceded by Alberto Tomba | Flag bearer for Italy; 1994 Lillehammer | Succeeded by Gerda Weissensteiner |
