= Kristina Andersson =

Swedish alpine skier

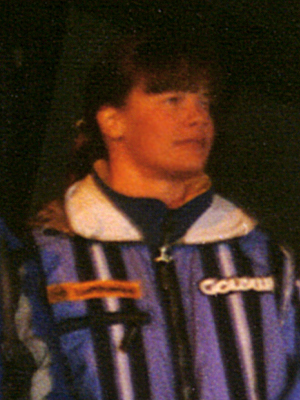
- Kristina Andersson during World Cup competitions in Semmering, Austria in December 1996.

Personal information
- Nationality: Sweden
- Born: 20 May 1965 (age 61) Frösön, Sweden

Sport
- Sport: Skiing

Kristina Andersson (born 20 May 1965) is a Swedish former alpine skier who competed in the 1988 Winter Olympics, 1992 Winter Olympics, and 1994 Winter Olympics.

She won one World Cup competition, a slalom competition in Maribor, Slovenia.

== World Cup competition victories ==
Date	Location	Race type
7 January 1996	Maribor, Slovenia	Slalom
