= Claudia Riegler (skier) =

Austrian alpine skier (born 1976)

Claudia Riegler (born 16 July 1976 in Salzburg, Austria) is an alpine skier from Austria who competed in slalom skiing for New Zealand.

She represented New Zealand in the 1994 Winter Olympics at Lillehammer, Norway; the 1998 Winter Olympics at Nagano, Japan; and the 2002 Winter Olympics at Salt Lake City, Utah, scoring a best finish of 11th place in the slalom at her last Games. She also served as an attaché for the New Zealand team at the 2006 Winter Olympics.

She competed in Alpine skiing World Cup races from 1995 to 2003. Riegler won four World Cup slaloms, all within a period of just over a year - between January 1996 and February 1997- in Saint-Gervais-les-Bains, Park City, Crans-Montana and Laax. She additionally took four third places in World Cup slalom, scoring her first podium in Maribor in 1996 and her last in Lenzerheide in 2002.

Riegler was part of Courchevel's successful bid for the 2023 Alpine Skiing World Championships, presenting on their behalf to the International Ski and Snowboard Federation's council.

She is married to French alpine ski racer Antoine Dénériaz: the couple live in Annecy and have two sons.
