= Sabina Panzanini =

Italian alpine skier (born 1972)

Sabina Panzanini (born February 16, 1972) is an Italian former Alpine skier. She competed at the 1994 Winter Olympics and the 1998 Winter Olympics.

Born in Eppan an der Weinstraße, in the South Tyrol, she competed in Alpine Skiing World Cup from 1991 to 2000, obtaining her first podium in December 1992 at Steamboat Springs. She won a total of 3 Giant Slalom victories.

== World Cup victories ==
Date	Location	Race
21 December 1994	(Italy) Alta Badia	Giant Slalom
21 November 1996	(United States) Park City	Giant Slalom
January 3, 1997	(Slovenia) Maribor	Giant Slalom
