= Karin Roten Meier =

Swiss alpine skier (born 1976)

Medal record

Women's alpine skiing

World Championships
Silver medal – second place	1996 Sierra Nevada	Giant slalom
Silver medal – second place	1997 Sestriere	Giant slalom
Bronze medal – third place	1997 Sestriere	Slalom

Karin Roten Meier (born 27 January 1976, in Leukerbad) is a Swiss retired alpine skier. She won two FIS Alpine Ski World Cup races in her career. She competed at the 1994 Winter Olympics and the 1998 Winter Olympics.

== World Cup victories ==
Date	Location	Race
10 March 1996	(Norway) Kvitfjell	Slalom
20 December 1998	(Switzerland) Veysonnaz	Slalom
