= Tom Stiansen =

Norwegian alpine skier

Medal record

Men's alpine skiing

World Championships
Gold medal – first place	1997 Sestrière	Slalom

Tom Stiansen (born 3 September 1970 in Borgen) is a Norwegian former alpine skier. The highlight of his career came in 1997 when he won the World Championship slalom in Sestriere, Italy.

In the Alpine skiing World Cup he obtained five podium places: in giant slalom, a 2nd place in Hafjell in 1996 and a 3rd place in Adelboden in 1996, and in slalom a 1st place in Breckenridge on 1 December 1996, a 2nd place in Kranjska Gora in 2004 and a 3rd place in South Korea in 1998.

He now presents a Norwegian reality television programme entitled: "71 grader nord". Contestants on the show are required to travel from the southernmost point of mainland Norway (Lindesnes) to the northernmost point (Nordkapp); a distance of just over 2,500 kilometres (1,600 mi). The journey usually takes about 10 weeks. The format has been adapted for a number of other European countries, including the UK under the name 71 Degrees North.

== World Cup victories ==
Date	Location	Race
1 December 1996	(United States) Breckenridge	Slalom
