= 1987 Alpine Skiing World Cup – Women's giant slalom =

1987 Women's giant slalom World Cup
Previous: 1986	Next: 1988

Women's giant slalom World Cup 1987/1988

== Final point standings ==
In women's giant slalom World Cup 1986/87 the best 5 results count. Deductions are given in ().

Place	Name	Country	Total points	Deduction	1 (United States)	4 (United States)	10 (Italy)	13 (Austria)	20 (West Germany)	21 (France)	24 (West Germany)	31 (Socialist Federal Republic of Yugoslavia)
1	Vreni Schneider	Switzerland	120	(27)	(15)	25	(12)	25	20	25	-	25
	Maria Walliser	Switzerland	120	(30)	-	20	25	(15)	25	(15)	25	25
3	Blanca Fernández Ochoa	Spain	78	(26)	(6)	(10)	20	11	(10)	20	15	12
4	Erika Hess	Switzerland	62	(16)	11	11	9	(9)	-	11	20	(7)
5	Michela Figini	Switzerland	55	(6)	12	-	15	6	-	(6)	7	15
6	Mateja Svet	Yugoslavia	51		20	-	-	20	11	-	-	-
7	Michaela Gerg	West Germany	48		25	-	3	8	-	7	5	-
8	Marina Kiehl	West Germany	42	(9)	-	(4)	6	(5)	8	10	12	6
	Brigitte Oertli	Switzerland	42		-	-	11	8	15	4	-	4
10	Catherine Quittet	France	30		10	-	7	-	1	12	-	-
11	Tamara McKinney	United States	30		9	-	-	12	-	1	8	-
	Sylvia Eder	Austria	27		-	-	2	-	6	8	2	9
13	Angelika Hurler	West Germany	26		7	-	-	-	-	9	-	10
14	Sigrid Wolf	Austria	23		-	-	-	-	5	-	10	8
15	Katrin Stotz	West Germany	18		2	-	10	-	-	-	6	-
	Zoe Haas	Switzerland	18		-	-	1	-	12	-	-	5
17	Corinne Schmidhauser	Switzerland	17		-	8	-	-	-	-	9	-
18	Elisabeth Kirchler	Austria	16		8	-	-	-	8	-	-	-
	Debbie Armstrong	United States	16		4	-	4	3	-	5	-	-
20	Josée Lacasse	Canada	15		-	15	-	-	-	-	-	-
21	Christelle Guignard	France	12		-	12	-	-	-	-	-	-
	Anita Wachter	Austria	12		-	-	-	1	-	-	-	11
23	Christa Kinshofer	Netherlands	11		-	-	-	-	-	-	11	-
	Carole Merle	France	11		-	-	-	4	-	3	4	-
25	Anne Flore Rey	France	10		3	7	-	-	-	-	-	-
	Eva Twardokens	United States	10		-	-	-	10	-	-	-	-
	Ingrid Salvenmoser	Austria	10		-	-	8	2	-	-	-	-
	Malgorzata Mogore-Tlalka	France	10		5	-	-	-	3	-	-	2
29	Cecilia Lucco	Italy	9		-	9	-	-	-	-	-	-
	Camilla Nilsson	Sweden	9		-	-	-	-	9	-	-	-
31	Monika Hess	Switzerland	6		-	6	-	-	-	-	-	-
32	Beth Madsen	United States	5		-	5	-	-	-	-	-	-
	Ulrike Maier	Austria	5		-	-	5	-	-	-	-	-
34	Monika Äijä	Sweden	4		-	-	-	-	4	-	-	-
	Traudl Hächer	West Germany	4		-	-	-	1	-	2	1	-
36	Fulvia Stevenin	Italy	3		-	3	-	-	-	-	-	-
	Christina Meier	West Germany	3		-	-	-	-	-	-	3	-
	Veronika Šarec	Yugoslavia	3		-	-	-	-	-	-	-	3
39	Catharina Glassér-Bjerner	Sweden	2		-	2	-	-	-	-	-	-
	Diane Haight	Canada	2		-	-	-	-	2	-	-	-2
	Anette Gersch	West Germany	2		1	-	-	-	-	-	-	1
42	Paoletta Magoni Sforza	Italy	1		-	1	-	-	-	-	-	-

== Women's giant slalom team results ==
All points were shown including individuel deduction. bold indicate highest score - italics indicate race wins

Place	Country	Total points	1 (United States)	4 (United States)	10 (Italy)	13 (Austria)	20 (West Germany)	21 (France)	24 (West Germany)	31 (Socialist Federal Republic of Yugoslavia)	Racers	Wins
1	Switzerland	529	38	70	73	63	72	61	61	**81**	8	8
2	West Germany	152	35	4	19	14	8	28	27	17	7	1
3	Spain	104	6	10	20	11	10	20	15	12	1	0
4	Austria	93	8	-	15	3	19	8	12	28	6	0
5	France	73	18	19	7	4	4	15	4	2	5	0
6	United States	61	13	5	4	25	-	6	8	-	4	0
7	Yugoslavia	54	20	-	-	20	11	-	-	3	2	0
8	Canada	17	-	15	-	-	2	-	-	-	2	0
9	Sweden	15	-	2	-	-	13	-	-	-	3	0
10	Italy	13	-	13	-	-	-	-	-	-	3	0
11	Netherlands	11	-	-	-	-	-	-	11	-	1	0

**Alpine skiing World Cup**
**Women**

Overall | Downhill | Super-G | Giant slalom | Slalom | Combined

**1987**
