= 1988 Alpine Skiing World Cup – Women's slalom =

1988 Women's slalom World Cup
| Previous: 1987 | Next: 1989 |

Women's slalom World Cup 1987/1988

== Final point standings ==
In women's slalom World Cup 1987/88 all results count. Every race saw a different winner.

| Place | Name | Country | Total points | 1 (Italy) | 3 (Italy) | 8 (Switzerland) | 10 (Italy) | 18 (Switzerland) | 20 (Austria) | 23 (Socialist Federal Republic of Yugoslavia) | 25 (United States) |
|---|---|---|---|---|---|---|---|---|---|---|---|
| 1 | Roswitha Steiner | Austria | 87 | 11 | - | 11 | 11 | 9 | - | 20 | 25 |
| 2 | Vreni Schneider | Switzerland | 80 | 15 | - | - | - | 20 | 25 | 20 | - |
| 3 | Anita Wachter | Austria | 75 | - | 25 | 8 | - | 3 | 7 | 12 | 20 |
| 4 | Blanca Fernández Ochoa | Spain | 73 | 25 | - | 15 | 6 | 10 | 6 | 11 | - |
| 5 | Christa Kinshofer | West Germany | 67 | 12 | - | - | 25 | - | 20 | 10 | - |
| 6 | Corinne Schmidhauser | Switzerland | 66 | 10 | - | 10 | 12 | 12 | 15 | 7 | - |
| 7 | Ida Ladstätter | Austria | 60 | 2 | 20 | 25 | - | 4 | 9 | - | - |
| 8 | Mateja Svet | Yugoslavia | 56 | 20 | - | - | - | - | 11 | 25 | - |
| 9 | Camilla Nilsson | Sweden | 50 | 6 | 12 | 20 | - | - | 12 | - | - |
| 10 | Ulrike Maier | Austria | 49 | 3 | 15 | - | 10 | 7 | 8 | 6 | - |
| 11 | Patricia Chauvet | France | 48 | - | 11 | 2 | 20 | 15 | - | - | - |
| 12 | Brigitte Oertli | Switzerland | 41 | - | - | 4 | 8 | 25 | 4 | - | - |
| 13 | Monika Maierhofer | Austria | 34 | - | - | - | - | - | 10 | 9 | 15 |
| 14 | Karin Buder | Austria | 32 | 4 | - | - | 7 | 5 | 3 | 1 | 12 |
| 15 | Dorota Tlałka-Mogore | France | 30 | - | - | 9 | - | 11 | 5 | 5 | - |
| 16 | Christelle Guignard | France | 21 | - | - | 7 | 5 | - | 1 | 8 | - |
| 17 | Claudia Strobl | Austria | 17 | - | 10 | - | 1 | 2 | - | 4 | - |
| 18 | Manuela Ruef | Austria | 16 | 9 | - | 5 | 2 | - | - | - | - |
| 19 | Veronika Šarec | Yugoslavia | 15 | - | - | - | 15 | - | - | - | - |
| 20 | Christine von Grünigen | Switzerland | 14 | - | - | 6 | - | 6 | 2 | - | - |
| 21 | Brigitte Gadient | Switzerland | 13 | 5 | 5 | - | 3 | - | - | - | - |
| 22 | Anni Kronbichler | Austria | 12 | - | - | 12 | - | - | - | - | - |
| | Monika Äijä | Sweden | 12 | - | 9 | 3 | - | - | - | - | - |
| | Pascaline Freiher | France | 12 | - | - | - | - | - | - | - | 12 |
| 25 | Lenka Kebrlová | Czechoslovakia | 11 | 8 | - | - | - | - | - | 3 | - |
| 26 | Beth Madsen | United States | 10 | - | - | - | - | - | - | - | 10 |
| 27 | Kristina Andersson | Sweden | 9 | - | - | - | 9 | - | - | - | - |
| | Karen Percy | Canada | 9 | - | - | - | - | - | - | - | 9 |
| | Heidi Voelker | United States | 9 | - | 1 | - | - | - | - | - | 8 |
| 30 | Anette Gersch | West Germany | 8 | - | 8 | - | - | - | - | - | - |
| | Heidi Gapp | Austria | 8 | 1 | 7 | - | - | - | - | - | - |
| | Paola Magoni-Sforza | Italy | 8 | - | - | - | - | 8 | - | - | - |
| | Mojca Dežman | Yugoslavia | 8 | - | 6 | - | - | - | - | 2 | - |
| 34 | Katja Lesjak | Yugoslavia | 7 | 7 | - | - | - | - | - | - | - |
| | Monique Pelletier | United States | 7 | - | - | - | - | - | - | - | 7 |
| 36 | Heidi Dahlgren | United States | 6 | - | - | - | - | - | - | - | 6 |
| 37 | Lucia Medzihradská | Czechoslovakia | 5 | - | 4 | 1 | - | - | - | - | - |
| | Gillian Frost | United States | 5 | - | - | - | - | - | - | - | 5 |
| 39 | Catharina Glassér-Bjerner | Sweden | 4 | - | - | - | 4 | - | - | - | - |
| | Sari Skaling | United States | 4 | - | - | - | - | - | - | - | 4 |
| 41 | Lesley Beck | United Kingdom | 3 | - | 3 | - | - | - | - | - | - |
| | Chantal Knapp | United States | 3 | - | - | - | - | - | - | - | 3 |
| 43 | Ulla Carlsson | Sweden | 2 | - | 2 | - | - | - | - | - | - |
| | Kate Rattray | New Zealand | 2 | - | - | - | - | - | - | - | 2 |
| 45 | Josée Lacasse | Canada | 1 | - | - | - | - | 1 | - | - | - |
| | Nicole Linneberg | Chile | 1 | - | - | - | - | - | - | - | 1 |

Alpine skiing World Cup
Women

Overall | Downhill | Super-G | Giant | Slalom | Combined

1988
