= 1987 Alpine Skiing World Cup – Women's slalom =

1987 Women's slalom World Cup
Previous: 1986	Next: 1988

Women's slalom World Cup 1987/1988

== Final point standings ==
In women's slalom World Cup 1986/87 the best 5 results count. Deductions are given in ().

Place	Name	Country	Total points	Deduction	2 (United States)	3 (United States)	8 (Italy)	9 (Italy)	11 (Italy)	12 (Socialist Federal Republic of Yugoslavia)	16 (Austria)	22 (France)	23 (Switzerland)	25 (Germany)
1	Corinne Schmidhauser	Switzerland	110	(28)	25	-	(10)	(12)	(6)	15	(6)	20	25	25
2	Tamara McKinney	United States	99		20	-	20	25	-	-	25	9	-	-
3	Erika Hess	Switzerland	96	(31)	(4)	25	(7)	(3)	25	11	(9)	(8)	15	20
4	Vreni Schneider	Switzerland	84	(4)	6	-	25	8	-	20	(4)	25	-	-
5	Brigitte Oertli	Switzerland	77	(15)	-	20	15	10	20	-	12	(5)	(10)	-
6	Roswitha Steiner	Austria	74	(11)	15	-	(11)	20	-	-	-	12	12	15
7	Monika Maierhofer	Austria	67	(8)	11	-	(8)	15	-	10	-	11	20	-
8	Camilla Nilsson	Sweden	66	(23)	10	(4)	(5)	(7)	-	25	11	(7)	8	12
9	Mateja Svet	Yugoslavia	55	(6)	8	8	-	-	-	12	20	(6)	-	7
10	Karin Buder	Austria	53	(4)	12	15	(4)	-	11	-	-	-	5	10
11	Malgorzata Mogore-Tlalka	France	44	(11)	-	7	(3)	(4)	8	8	15	-	6	(4)
12	Paoletta Magoni Sforza	Italy	43		-	10	6	-	12	-	6	-	-	9
	Ida Ladstätter	Austria	43		-	11	-	11	-	3	10	-	-	8
14	Anita Wachter	Austria	37		-	12	9	-	-	1	-	-	4	11
15	Claudia Strobl	Austria	34		-	6	-	5	15	-	-	-	7	1
16	Brigitte Gadient	Switzerland	31		-	-	12	9	-	-	-	4	-	6
17	Christine von Grünigen	Switzerland	29		9	-	-	2	-	-	-	2	11	5
18	Blanca Fernández Ochoa	Spain	24		-	-	-	-	-	-	-	15	9	-
19	Ulrike Maier	Austria	23		3	10	-	-	10	-	-	-5	-	-
20	Dorota Mogore-Tlalka	France	20		-	-	-	-	3	7	-	10	-	-
21	Nicoletta Merighetti	Italy	13		-	3	-	-	2	-	8	-	-	-
	Caroline Beer	Austria	13		-	-	-	-	4	7	2	-	-	-
23	Lenka Kebrlová	Czechoslovakia	12		-	-	-	-	5	-	7	-	-	-
	Eva Twardokens	United States	12		-	-	-	6	-	-	3	3	-	-
	Nadia Bonfini	Italy	12		-	-	1	1	7	-	-	-	-	3
26	Mojca Dežman	Yugoslavia	11		5	-	-	-	-	5	1	-	-	-
27	Catharina Glassér-Bjerner	Sweden	10		-	-	-	-	1	9	-	-	-	-
28	Kristina Andersson	Sweden	9		-	-	-	-	9	-	-	-	-	-
29	Monika Äijä	Sweden	8		8	-	-	-	-	-	-	-	-	-
30	Helga Lazak	West Germany	7		2	1	3	-	-	-	-	-	1	-
31	Manuela Ruef	Austria	5		-	5	-	-	-	-	-	-	-	-
	Christa Kinshofer	Netherlands	5		-	-	-	-	-	-	-	-	3	2
33	Lucia Medzihradská	Czechoslovakia	4		-	-	-	-	-	4	-	-	-	-
	Heidi Gapp	Austria	4		-	-	-	-	-	2	-	-	2	-
35	Anette Gersch	West Germany	2		-	2	-	-	-	-	-	-	-	-
36	Beth Madsen	United States	1		1	-	-	-	-	-	-	-	-	-
	Monika Hess	Switzerland	1		-	-	-	-	-	-	-	1	-	-

== Women's slalom team results ==
All points were shown including individuel deduction. bold indicate highest score - italics indicate race wins

Place	Country	Total points	2 (United States)	3 (United States)	8 (Italy)	9 (Italy)	11 (Italy)	12 (Socialist Federal Republic of Yugoslavia)	16 (Austria)	22 (France)	23 (Switzerland)	25 (Germany)	Racers	Wins
1	Switzerland	512	44	45	**69**	44	51	46	31	65	61	56	7	7
2	Austria	376	41	59	32	51	40	23	12	23	50	45	10	0
3	Sweden	116	18	4	5	7	10	34	11	7	8	12	4	1
4	United States	112	21	-	20	31	-	-	28	12	-	-	3	2
5	France	75	-	7	3	4	11	15	15	10	6	4	2	0
6	Yugoslavia	72	13	8	-	-	-	17	21	6	-	7	2	0
7	Italy	68	-	13	7	1	21	-	14	-	-	12	3	0
8	Spain	24	-	-	-	-	-	-	-	15	9	-	1	0
9	Czechoslovakia	16	-	-	-	-	5	4	7	-	-	-	2	0
10	West Germany	9	2	3	3	-	-	-	-	-	1	-	2	0
11	Netherlands	5	-	-	-	-	-	-	-	-	3	2	1	0

**Alpine skiing World Cup**
**Women**

Overall | Downhill | Super-G | Giant slalom | Slalom | Combined

**1987**
