= 1987 Alpine Skiing World Cup – Men's super-G =

1987 Men's Super G World Cup
Previous: 1986	Next: 1988

Men's Super-G World Cup 1986/1987

== Final point standings ==
In Men's Super-G World Cup 1986/87 all five results count, but no athlete was able to collect points in all five races. Pirmin Zurbriggen won the cup with only one win.

Place	Name	Country	Total points	6 (France)	16 (Germany)	28 (Japan)	30 (United States)	32 (Canada)
1	Pirmin Zurbriggen	Switzerland	85	-	20	20	25	20
2	Marc Girardelli	Luxembourg	65	15	-	25	-	25
3	Markus Wasmeier	West Germany	50	25	25	-	-	-
4	Robert Erlacher	Italy	44	20	-	-	12	12
5	Leonhard Stock	Austria	42	3	-	15	9	15
6	Günther Mader	Austria	29	-	10	3	7	9
	Herbert Renoth	West Germany	29	12	9	-	-	8
8	Richard Pramotton	Italy	28	8	-	-	20	-
9	Michael Eder	West Germany	26	10	5	-	-	11
10	Guido Hinterseer	Austria	24	4	-	-	10	10
11	Hans Stuffer	West Germany	23	-	11	-	12	-
12	Karl Alpiger	Switzerland	20	-	8	12	-	-
13	Andreas Wenzel	Liechtenstein	18	11	-	-	-	7
	Alberto Ghidoni	Italy	18	-	15	2	-	1
15	Gerhard Pfaffenbichler	Austria	17	2	4	11	-	-
16	Martin Hangl	Switzerland	16	9	1	-	-	6
	Günther Marxer	Liechtenstein	16	8	-	-	6	2
18	Peter Roth	West Germany	15	-	-	-	15	-
	Alberto Tomba	Italy	15	-	-	7	8	-
20	Felix Belczyk	Canada	13	-	-	9	-	4
21	Franck Piccard	France	12	-	12	-	-	-
	Hubert Strolz	Austria	12	5	7	-	-	-
	Heinz Holzer	Italy	12	6	6	-	-	-
24	Igor Cigolla	Italy	10	-	-	10	-	-
25	Franz Heinzer	Switzerland	9	-	-	-	4	5
26	Daniel Mahrer	Switzerland	8	-	-	8	-	-
	Peter Wirnsberger	Austria	8	-	3	-	5	-
28	Rudolf Huber	Austria	6	-	-	6	-	-
29	Stefan Niederseer	Austria	5	-	-	5	-	-
	Werner Marti	Switzerland	5	-	2	-	3	-
31	Michael Mair	Italy	4	-	-	4	-	-
32	Gustav Oehrli	Switzerland	3	-	-	-	-	3
33	Hans-Jörg Tauscher	West Germany	2	-	-	-	2	-
34	Attilio Barcella	Italy	1	1	-	-	-	-
	Ivano Camozzi	Italy	1	1	-	-	-	-
	Sepp Wildgruber	West Germany	1	-	-	1	-	-
	Bernhard Gstrein	Austria	1	-	-	-	1	-

Alpine skiing World Cup
Men

Overall | Downhill | Super-G | Giant | Slalom | Combined

1987
