= 1985–86 FIS Alpine Ski Europa Cup =

Alpine skiing competition

| Discipline | Men | Women |
| Overall | (Austria) Rudolf Nierlich | (Austria) Manuela Rüf |
| Downhill | (Switzerland) Michael Plöchinger | (Switzerland) Chantal Bournissen |
| Super-G | (Austria) Rainer Salzgeber | (Austria) Astrid Geisler |
| Giant Slalom | (Austria) Rudolf Nierlich | (Italy) Cecilia Lucco |
| Slalom | (Italy) Carlo Gerosa | (Sweden) Catharina Glassér-Bjerner |

Competition

1985–86 FIS Alpine Ski Europa Cup was the 15th season of the FIS Alpine Ski Europa Cup.

== Standings ==
=== Overall ===
Men's

| Rank | Skier | Country | Points |
|---|---|---|---|
| 1 | Rudolf Nierlich | Austria | 220 |
| 2 | Niklas Lindqvist | Sweden | 125 |
| 3 | Helmut Mayer | Austria | 111 |
| 4 | Carlo Gerosa | Italy | 110 |
| 5 | Michael Plöchinger | Switzerland | 105 |
| 6 | Gerhard Lieb | Austria | 100 |
| 7 | Rainer Salzgeber | Austria | 97 |
| 8 | Mats Ericson | Sweden | 73 |
| 9 | Ernst Riedlsperger | Austria | 68 |
| 10 | Franck Pons | France | 65 |

Women

| Rank | Skier | Country | Points |
|---|---|---|---|
| 1 | Manuela Rüf | Austria | 189 |
| 2 | Catharina Glassér-Bjerner | Sweden | 165 |
| 3 | Astrid Geisler | Austria | 114 |
| 4 | Andrea Salvenmoser | Austria | 109 |
| 5 | Christine von Grünigen | Switzerland | 108 |
| 6 | Chantal Bournissen | Switzerland | 105 |
| 7 | Beatrice Gafner | Switzerland | 103 |
| 8 | Cecilia Lucco | Italy | 102 |
| 9 | Nicoletta Merighetti | Italy | 98 |
| 10 | Camilla Nilsson | Sweden | 95 |

=== Downhill ===
Men's

| Rank | Skier | Country | Points |
|---|---|---|---|
| 1 | Michael Plöchinger | Switzerland | 105 |
| 2 | Franck Pons | France | 65 |
| 3 | Atle Skårdal | Norway | 62 |
| 4 | Alberto Ghidoni | Italy | 58 |
| 5 | Carlo Cerutti | Italy | 53 |

Women

| Rank | Skier | Country | Points |
|---|---|---|---|
| 1 | Chantal Bournissen | Switzerland | 105 |
| 2 | Beatrice Gafner | Switzerland | 103 |
| 3 | Astrid Geisler | Austria | 89 |
| 4 | Golnur Postnikova | Soviet Union | 63 |
| 5 | Lucie Laroche | Canada | 54 |

=== Super G ===
Men's

| Rank | Skier | Country | Points |
|---|---|---|---|
| 1 | Rainer Salzgeber | Austria | 45 |
| 2 | Rudolf Stocker | Austria | 40 |
| 3 | Batista Tomasoni | Italy | 32 |
| 4 | Jean-Luc Cretier | France | 28 |
| 5 | Rudolf Nierlich | Austria | 25 |
| 5 | Alberto Tomba | Italy | 25 |
| 5 | Stefan Grunder | Switzerland | 25 |

Women

| Rank | Skier | Country | Points |
|---|---|---|---|
| 1 | Astrid Geisler | Austria | 25 |
| 2 | Ulrike Maier | Austria | 20 |
| 3 | Andrea Salvenmoser | Austria | 15 |
| 4 | Kjersti Nilsen | Norway | 12 |
| 5 | Lara Magoni | Italy | 11 |

=== Giant Slalom ===
Men's

| Rank | Skier | Country | Points |
|---|---|---|---|
| 1 | Rudolf Nierlich | Austria | 106 |
| 2 | Helmut Mayer | Austria | 89 |
| 3 | Niklas Lindqvist | Sweden | 52 |
| 3 | Rainer Salzgeber | Austria | 52 |
| 5 | Walter Gugele | Austria | 46 |

Women

| Rank | Skier | Country | Points |
|---|---|---|---|
| 1 | | Cecilia Lucco | Italy | 102 |
| 2 | Manuela Rüf | Austria | 98 |
| 3 | Fulvia Stevenin | Italy | 60 |
| 3 | Monica Äijä | Sweden | 60 |
| 5 | Catharina Glassér-Bjerner | Sweden | 56 |

=== Slalom ===
Men's

| Rank | Skier | Country | Points |
|---|---|---|---|
| 1 | Carlo Gerosa | Italy | 110 |
| 2 | Rudolf Nierlich | Austria | 89 |
| 3 | Niklas Lindqvist | Sweden | 73 |
| 3 | Mats Ericson | Sweden | 73 |
| 5 | Ernst Riedlsperger | Austria | 68 |

Women

| Rank | Skier | Country | Points |
|---|---|---|---|
| 1 | Catharina Glassér-Bjerner | Sweden | 109 |
| 2 | Christine von Grünigen | Switzerland | 108 |
| 3 | Nicoletta Merighetti | Italy | 98 |
| 4 | Manuela Rüf | Austria | 91 |
| 5 | Camilla Nilsson | Sweden | 75 |
