= 1988 Alpine Skiing World Cup – Women's giant slalom =

1988 Women's giant slalom World Cup
Previous: 1987	Next: 1989

Women's giant slalom World Cup 1987/1988

== Final point standings ==
In women's giant slalom World Cup 1987/88 all results count.

Place	Name	Country	Total points	11 (Italy)	13 (France)	14 (France)	22 (Socialist Federal Republic of Yugoslavia)	26 (United States)	29 (Austria)
1	Mateja Svet	Yugoslavia	87	12	10	3	25	12	25
2	Catherine Quittet	France	78	25	20	12	11	10	-
3	Vreni Schneider	Switzerland	76	20	25	11	20	-	-
4	Anita Wachter	Austria	74	10	11	9	15	9	20
5	Blanca Fernández Ochoa	Spain	66	8	-	15	15	20	8
6	Carole Merle	France	59	7	15	25	5	7	-
7	Christina Meier	West Germany	53	5	-	1	10	25	12
8	Maria Walliser	Switzerland	40	11	9	20	-	-	-
9	Ulrike Maier	Austria	39	-	-	-	9	15	15
10	Michela Figini	Switzerland	29	15	12	2	-	-	-
11	Christa Kinshofer	West Germany	22	1	1	6	7	7	-
12	Angelika Hurler	West Germany	21	-	-	-	2	8	11
13	Marina Kiehl	West Germany	20	-	8	8	-	-	4
14	Sigrid Wolf	Austria	19	9	-	10	-	-	-
15	Christelle Guignard	France	18	-	6	-	6	-	6
16	Michaela Gerg	West Germany	16	4	7	5	-	-	-
	Ingrid Salvenmoser	Austria	16	-	-	7	4	5	-
	Camilla Nilsson	Sweden	16	-	-	-	8	3	5
19	Tamara McKinney	United States	12	-	-	-	-	11	1
20	Corinne Schmidhauser	Switzerland	11	6	5	-	-	-	-
21	Adenine Teyssier	France	10	-	-	-	-	-	10
22	Traudl Hächer	West Germany	9	-	-	-	-	-	9
23	Katrin Stotz	West Germany	8	4	4	-	-	-	-
24	Małgorzata Tlałka-Mogore	France	7	-	3	4	-	-	-
	Sandra Burn	Switzerland	7	-	-	-	-	-	7
26	Jolanda Kindle	Liechtenstein	6	-	2	-	1	-	3
27	Brigitte Oertli	Switzerland	4	-	-	-	-	4	-
28	Anette Gersch	West Germany	3	-	-	-	3	-	-
29	Karin Dedler	West Germany	2	2	-	-	-	-	-
	Elisabeth Kirchler	Austria	2	-	-	-	-	2	-
	Diann Roffe	United States	2	-	-	-	-	-	2
32	Debbie Armstrong	United States	1	-	-	-	-	1	-

Alpine skiing World Cup
Women

Overall | Downhill | Super-G | Giant Slalom | Slalom | Combined

1988
