= 1986–87 FIS Alpine Ski World Cup =

International sports competition

FIS Alpine Ski World Cup 1986/87
Discipline	Men	Women
Overall	(Switzerland) Pirmin Zurbriggen	(Switzerland) Maria Walliser
Downhill	(Switzerland) Pirmin Zurbriggen	(Switzerland) Michela Figini
Super G	(Switzerland) Pirmin Zurbriggen	(Switzerland) Maria Walliser
Giant Slalom	(Switzerland) Pirmin Zurbriggen	(Switzerland) Vreni Schneider (Switzerland) Maria Walliser
Slalom	(Socialist Federal Republic of Yugoslavia) Bojan Križaj	(Switzerland) Corinne Schmidhauser
Nations Cup	Switzerland	Switzerland
- Nations Cup overall: Switzerland

Competition
Locations	19	17
Individual	34	31

The 21st World Cup season began in August 1986 in Argentina for men, resumed in late November, and concluded in March 1987 in Sarajevo. The overall champions were Pirmin Zurbriggen and Maria Walliser, both of Switzerland, who each won for the second time. Two-time women's overall World Cup champion Erika Hess of Switzerland retired at the end of the season.

Along with the elimination of the Combined discipline championship, all of the combined races on the schedule were eliminated except for the traditional two combineds at Wengen, Switzerland (the Lauberhorn) and Kitzbühel, Austria (the Hahnenkamm) for the men and one at Mellau, Austria for the women. However, under new rules, points were only awarded to skiers who finished in the top 30 in each of the downhill and slalom; as a result, only two men earned points. In addition, despite the presence of two tiebreakers, the ladies' Giant Slalom discipline ended in a tie.

A break in the schedule was for the 1987 World Championships, held in Crans-Montana, Switzerland, between January 27 and February 8, 1987.

== Calendar ==
=== Men ===
Event Key: DH – Downhill, SL – Slalom, GS – Giant Slalom, SG – Super Giant Slalom, KB – Combined, PS – Parallel Slalom (Nations Cup ranking only)
Race	Season	Date	Place	Type	Winner	Second	Third
569	1	15 August 1986	(Argentina) Las Leñas	DH _{167}	(Switzerland) Peter Müller	(Switzerland) Karl Alpiger	(Switzerland) Franz Heinzer
570	2	16 August 1986	(Argentina) Las Leñas	DH _{168}	(Switzerland) Pirmin Zurbriggen	(Austria) Leonhard Stock	(Switzerland) Peter Müller (Switzerland) Franz Heinzer
571	3	29 November 1986	(Italy) Sestriere	SL _{179}	(Sweden) Ingemar Stenmark	(Sweden) Jonas Nilsson	(Italy) Richard Pramotton
572	4	30 November 1986	(Italy) Sestriere	GS _{158}	(Italy) Richard Pramotton	(Austria) Hubert Strolz	(Switzerland) Pirmin Zurbriggen
573	5	5 December 1986	(France) Val d'Isère	DH _{169}	(Switzerland) Pirmin Zurbriggen	(West Germany) Markus Wasmeier	(Italy) Michael Mair
574	6	6 December 1986	(France) Val d'Isère	SG _{018}	(West Germany) Markus Wasmeier	(Italy) Roberto Erlacher	(Luxembourg) Marc Girardelli
575	7	13 December 1986	(Italy) Val Gardena	DH _{170}	(Canada) Rob Boyd	(Italy) Michael Mair	(West Germany) Markus Wasmeier
576	8	14 December 1986	(Italy) Alta Badia	GS _{159}	(Italy) Richard Pramotton	(Italy) Alberto Tomba	(Italy) Oswald Totsch
577	9	15 December 1986	(Italy) Alta Badia	GS _{160}	(Switzerland) Joël Gaspoz	(Italy) Richard Pramotton	(West Germany) Markus Wasmeier
578	10	16 December 1986	(Italy) Madonna di Campiglio	SL _{180}	(Italy) Ivano Edalini	(Sweden) Ingemar Stenmark	(Switzerland) Joël Gaspoz
579	11	19 December 1986	(Socialist Federal Republic of Yugoslavia) Kranjska Gora	GS _{161}	(Switzerland) Joël Gaspoz	(Italy) Roberto Erlacher	(Italy) Richard Pramotton
580	12	20 December 1986	(Socialist Federal Republic of Yugoslavia) Kranjska Gora	SL _{181}	(Socialist Federal Republic of Yugoslavia) Bojan Križaj	(Socialist Federal Republic of Yugoslavia) Rok Petrović	(Sweden) Ingemar Stenmark
581	13	21 December 1986	(Austria) Hinterstoder	SL _{182}	(West Germany) Armin Bittner	(Socialist Federal Republic of Yugoslavia) Bojan Križaj	(Italy) Oswald Totsch
Nations Cup		28 December 1986	(Germany) Berlin	PS _{ncr}	(Austria) Leonhard Stock	(Socialist Federal Republic of Yugoslavia) Bojan Križaj	(Germany) Michael Eder
582	14	4 January 1987	(Switzerland) Laax	DH _{171}	(Switzerland) Franz Heinzer	(Austria) Peter Wirnsberger	(Austria) Erwin Resch
583	15	10 January 1987	(West Germany) Garmisch	DH _{172}	(Switzerland) Pirmin Zurbriggen	(Italy) Michael Mair	(Switzerland) Peter Müller
584	16	11 January 1987	(West Germany) Garmisch	SG _{019}	(West Germany) Markus Wasmeier	(Switzerland) Pirmin Zurbriggen	(Italy) Alberto Ghidoni
585	17	13 January 1987	(Switzerland) Adelboden	GS _{162}	(Switzerland) Pirmin Zurbriggen	(Luxembourg) Marc Girardelli	(Austria) Hubert Strolz
586	18	17 January 1987	(Switzerland) Wengen	DH _{173}	(West Germany) Markus Wasmeier	(Switzerland) Karl Alpiger	(Switzerland) Franz Heinzer
587	19	18 January 1987	(Switzerland) Wengen	SL _{183}	(Switzerland) Joël Gaspoz	(Austria) Dietmar Köhlbichler	(Socialist Federal Republic of Yugoslavia) Bojan Križaj
588	20	18 January 1987	(Switzerland) Wengen	KB _{050}	(Switzerland) Pirmin Zurbriggen	only one competitor ranked	
589	21	20 January 1987	(Switzerland) Adelboden	GS _{163}	(Switzerland) Pirmin Zurbriggen	(Switzerland) Joël Gaspoz	(Sweden) Ingemar Stenmark
590	22	25 January 1987	(Austria) Kitzbühel	DH _{174}	(Switzerland) Pirmin Zurbriggen	(Austria) Erwin Resch	(Switzerland) Peter Müller
591	23	25 January 1987	(Austria) Kitzbühel	SL _{184}	(Socialist Federal Republic of Yugoslavia) Bojan Križaj	(Austria) Mathias Berthold	(West Germany) Armin Bittner
592	24	25 January 1987	(Austria) Kitzbühel	KB _{051}	(Switzerland) Pirmin Zurbriggen	(Liechtenstein) Andreas Wenzel	only two competitors ranked
1987 World Championships (27 January–8 February)
593	25	14 February 1987	(France) Markstein	SL _{185}	(Sweden) Ingemar Stenmark	(West Germany) Armin Bittner	(Austria) Günther Mader
594	26	15 February 1987	(West Germany) Todtnau	GS _{164}	(Switzerland) Pirmin Zurbriggen	(Luxembourg) Marc Girardelli	(West Germany) Markus Wasmeier
595	27	28 February 1987	(Japan) Furano	DH _{175}	(Switzerland) Peter Müller	(Luxembourg) Marc Girardelli	(Italy) Michael Mair
596	28	1 March 1987	(Japan) Furano	SG _{020}	(Luxembourg) Marc Girardelli	(Switzerland) Pirmin Zurbriggen	(Austria) Leonhard Stock
597	29	7 March 1987	(United States) Aspen	DH _{176}	(Switzerland) Pirmin Zurbriggen	(Switzerland) Daniel Mahrer	(Switzerland) Karl Alpiger
598	30	8 March 1987	(United States) Aspen	SG _{021}	(Switzerland) Pirmin Zurbriggen	(Italy) Richard Pramotton	(West Germany) Peter Roth
599	31	14 March 1987	(Canada) Nakiska	DH _{177}	(Switzerland) Peter Müller	(Switzerland) Franz Heinzer	(Switzerland) Daniel Mahrer
600	32	15 March 1987	(Canada) Nakiska	SG _{022}	(Luxembourg) Marc Girardelli	(Switzerland) Pirmin Zurbriggen	(Austria) Leonhard Stock
601	33	21 March 1987	(Socialist Federal Republic of Yugoslavia) Sarajevo	SL _{186}	(Socialist Federal Republic of Yugoslavia) Grega Benedik	(Socialist Federal Republic of Yugoslavia) Bojan Križaj	(France) Didier Bouvet
602	34	22 March 1987	(Socialist Federal Republic of Yugoslavia) Sarajevo	GS _{165}	(Luxembourg) Marc Girardelli	(Switzerland) Joël Gaspoz	(Austria) Rudolf Nierlich

=== Ladies ===
Event Key: DH – Downhill, SL – Slalom, GS – Giant Slalom, SG – Super Giant Slalom, KB – Combined, PS – Parallel Slalom (Nations Cup ranking only)
Race	Season	Date	Place	Type	Winner	Second	Third
525	1	29 November 1986	(United States) Park City	GS _{152}	(West Germany) Michaela Gerg	(Socialist Federal Republic of Yugoslavia) Mateja Svet	(Switzerland) Vreni Schneider
526	2	30 November 1986	(United States) Park City	SL _{174}	(Switzerland) Corinne Schmidhauser	(United States) Tamara McKinney	(Austria) Roswitha Steiner
527	3	5 December 1986	(United States) Waterville Valley	SL _{175}	(Switzerland) Erika Hess	(Switzerland) Brigitte Oertli	(Austria) Karin Buder
528	4	6 December 1986	(United States) Waterville Valley	GS _{153}	(Switzerland) Vreni Schneider	(Switzerland) Maria Walliser	(Canada) Josée Lacasse
529	5	12 December 1986	(France) Val d'Isère	DH _{142}	(Switzerland) Michela Figini	(Switzerland) Maria Walliser	(Switzerland) Heidi Zurbriggen
530	6	13 December 1986	(France) Val d'Isère	DH _{143}	(Canada) Laurie Graham	(Switzerland) Maria Walliser	(France) Catherine Quittet
531	7	14 December 1986	(France) Val d'Isère	SG _{014}	(Switzerland) Maria Walliser	(France) Catherine Quittet	(Switzerland) Vreni Schneider
532	8	17 December 1986	(Italy) Courmayeur	SL _{176}	(Switzerland) Vreni Schneider	(United States) Tamara McKinney	(Switzerland) Brigitte Oertli
533	9	18 December 1986	(Italy) Courmayeur	SL _{177}	(United States) Tamara McKinney	(Austria) Roswitha Steiner	(Austria) Monika Maierhofer
534	10	20 December 1986	(Italy) Val Zoldana	GS _{154}	(Switzerland) Maria Walliser	(Spain) Blanca Fernández Ochoa	(Switzerland) Michela Figini
535	11	21 December 1986	(Italy) Val Zoldana	SL _{178}	(Switzerland) Erika Hess	(Switzerland) Brigitte Oertli	(Austria) Claudia Strobl
536	12	4 January 1987	(Socialist Federal Republic of Yugoslavia) Maribor	SL _{179}	(Sweden) Camilla Nilsson	(Switzerland) Vreni Schneider	(Switzerland) Corinne Schmidhauser
537	13	5 January 1987	(Austria) Saalbach	GS _{155}	(Switzerland) Vreni Schneider	(Socialist Federal Republic of Yugoslavia) Mateja Svet	(Switzerland) Maria Walliser
538	14	6 January 1987	(Austria) Saalbach	SG _{015}	(Switzerland) Maria Walliser	(Switzerland) Brigitte Oertli	(Socialist Federal Republic of Yugoslavia) Mateja Svet
539	15	10 January 1987	(Austria) Mellau	DH _{144}	(Switzerland) Beatrice Gafner	(Switzerland) Maria Walliser	(Austria) Sieglinde Winkler
540	16	11 January 1987	(Austria) Mellau	SL _{180}	(United States) Tamara McKinney	(Socialist Federal Republic of Yugoslavia) Mateja Svet	(France) Małgorzata Tlałka-Mogore
541	17	11 January 1987	(Austria) Mellau	KB _{046}	(Switzerland) Brigitte Oertli	(Switzerland) Vreni Schneider	(Switzerland) Erika Hess
542	18	16 January 1987	(West Germany) Pfronten	DH _{145}	(Switzerland) Michela Figini	(West Germany) Regine Mösenlechner	(Switzerland) Maria Walliser
543	19	17 January 1987	(West Germany) Pfronten	SG _{016}	(France) Catherine Quittet	(West Germany) Traudl Hächer Gavet	(West Germany) Marina Kiehl
544	20	18 January 1987	(West Germany) Bischofswiesen	GS _{156}	(Switzerland) Maria Walliser	(Switzerland) Vreni Schneider	(Switzerland) Brigitte Oertli
Nations Cup		18 January 1987	(Germany) Munich	PS _{ncr}	(United States) Tamara McKinney	(France) Małgorzata Tlałka-Mogore	(Switzerland) Corinne Schmidhauser
1987 World Championships (27 January–8 February)
545	21	13 February 1987	(France) Megève	GS _{157}	(Switzerland) Vreni Schneider	(Spain) Blanca Fernández Ochoa	(Switzerland) Maria Walliser
546	22	14 February 1987	(France) St. Gervais	SL _{181}	(Switzerland) Vreni Schneider	(Switzerland) Corinne Schmidhauser	(Spain) Blanca Fernández Ochoa
547	23	15 February 1987	(Switzerland) Flühli	SL _{182}	(Switzerland) Corinne Schmidhauser	(Austria) Monika Maierhofer	(Switzerland) Erika Hess
548	24	27 February 1987	(West Germany) Zwiesel	GS _{158}	(Switzerland) Maria Walliser	(Switzerland) Erika Hess	(Spain) Blanca Fernández Ochoa
549	25	28 February 1987	(West Germany) Zwiesel	SL _{183}	(Switzerland) Corinne Schmidhauser	(Switzerland) Erika Hess	(Austria) Roswitha Steiner
550	26	8 March 1987	(Canada) Nakiska	DH _{146}	(Switzerland) Michela Figini	(Canada) Laurie Graham	(West Germany) Regine Mösenlechner
551	27	13 March 1987	(United States) Vail	DH _{147}	(Austria) Sigrid Wolf	(Austria) Elisabeth Kirchler	(United States) Pam Fletcher
552	28	14 March 1987	(United States) Vail	DH _{148}	(Austria) Sigrid Wolf	(Canada) Laurie Graham	(Switzerland) Maria Walliser
553	29	15 March 1987	(United States) Vail	SG _{017}	(West Germany) Marina Kiehl	(Austria) Anita Wachter	(Austria) Sigrid Wolf
554	30	15 March 1987	(United States) Vail	SG _{018}	(Switzerland) Maria Walliser	(Austria) Sigrid Wolf	(Austria) Anita Wachter
555	31	22 March 1987	(Socialist Federal Republic of Yugoslavia) Sarajevo	GS _{159}	(Switzerland) Maria Walliser (Switzerland) Vreni Schneider		(Switzerland) Michela Figini

== Men ==
=== Overall ===
see complete table

In Men's Overall World Cup 1986/87 the best four downhills, the best four Super Gs, best four giant slaloms, best four slaloms and both combined count. 30 racers had a point deduction.

Place	Name	Country	Total	DH	SG	GS	SL	KB
1	Pirmin Zurbriggen	Switzerland	339	100	85	90	14	50
2	Marc Girardelli	Luxembourg	190	50	65	65	10	0
3	Markus Wasmeier	West Germany	174	72	50	51	1	0
4	Joël Gaspoz	Switzerland	153	0	0	90	63	0
5	Richard Pramotton	Italy	139	0	28	85	26	0
6	Ingemar Stenmark	Sweden	134	0	0	49	85	0
7	Leonhard Stock	Austria	97	50	42	5	0	0
8	Robert Erlacher	Italy	94	0	44	50	0	0
9	Peter Müller	Switzerland	90	90	0	0	0	0
	Bojan Križaj	Yugoslavia	90	0	0	0	90	0
11	Karl Alpiger	Switzerland	87	67	20	0	0	0
12	Franz Heinzer	Switzerland	84	75	9	0	0	0
13	Günther Mader	Austria	83	0	29	12	42	0
14	Hubert Strolz	Austria	81	0	12	57	12	0
15	Alberto Tomba	Italy	76	0	15	49	12	0
16	Michael Mair	Italy	74	70	4	0	0	0
17	Armin Bittner	West Germany	69	0	0	0	69	0
18	Daniel Mahrer	Switzerland	66	58	8	0	0	0
19	Andreas Wenzel	Liechtenstein	63	0	18	15	10	20
	Rudolf Nierlich	Austria	63	0	0	34	29	0

=== Downhill ===
see complete table

In Men's Downhill World Cup 1986/87 the best five results count. 15 racers had a point deduction, which are given in (). Pirmin Zurbriggen won the cup with maximum points. Swiss athletes won 8 races out of 10.

Place	Name	Country	Total	1	2	5	7	14	15	18	22	27	29	31
1	Pirmin Zurbriggen	Switzerland	125	(10)	25	25	(10)	(8)	25	(7)	25	-	25	(5)
2	Peter Müller	Switzerland	105	25	15	(11)	(11)	-	15	(11)	(15)	25	-	25
3	Franz Heinzer	Switzerland	90	15	15	(9)	(12)	25	-	15	(11)	-	(8)	20
4	Markus Wasmeier	West Germany	83	(6)	11	20	15	(6)	12	25	(10)	-	-	-
5	Michael Mair	Italy	82	-	-	15	20	(11)	20	-	-	15	12	-
6	Karl Alpiger	Switzerland	79	20	(10)	(4)	-	(9)	(5)	20	(7)	12	15	12
7	Daniel Mahrer	Switzerland	68	(7)	(9)	(1)	-	12	11	10	(6)	-	20	15
8	Rob Boyd	Canada	62	-	-	-	25	-	10	5	(5)	11	-	11
9	Peter Wirnsberger	Austria	57	8	8	-	(3)	20	(7)	9	12	(4)	(5)	-
10	Marc Girardelli	Luxembourg	56	12	6	-	-	7	(6)	-	-	20	11	-
	Leonhard Stock	Austria	56	11	20	(3)	6	-	(1)	(3)	9	(3)	(4)	10

=== Super G ===
see complete table

In Men's Super G World Cup 1986/87 all five results count, but no athlete was able to collect points in all five races. Pirmin Zurbriggen won the cup with only one win.

Place	Name	Country	Total	6	16	28	30	32
1	Pirmin Zurbriggen	Switzerland	85	-	20	20	25	20
2	Marc Girardelli	Luxembourg	65	15	-	25	-	25
3	Markus Wasmeier	West Germany	50	25	25	-	-	-
4	Robert Erlacher	Italy	44	20	-	-	12	12
5	Leonhard Stock	Austria	42	3	-	15	9	15
6	Günther Mader	Austria	29	-	10	3	7	9
	Herbert Renoth	West Germany	29	12	9	-	-	8
8	Richard Pramotton	Italy	28	8	-	-	20	-
9	Michael Eder	West Germany	26	10	5	-	-	11
10	Guido Hinterseer	Austria	24	4	-	-	10	10

=== Giant Slalom ===
see complete table

In Men's Giant Slalom World Cup 1986/87 the best five results count. Zurbriggen and Gaspoz finished with the same number of points, but Zurbriggen was awarded the championship based on the victories tiebreaker (three wins to two).

Place	Name	Country	Total	4	8	9	11	17	21	26	34
1	Pirmin Zurbriggen	Switzerland	102	15	-	12	(7)	25	25	25	(10)
1	Joël Gaspoz	Switzerland	102	12	-	25	25	-	20	(9)	20
3	Richard Pramotton	Italy	95	25	25	20	15	-	(3)	10	-
4	Hubert Strolz	Austria	66	20	-	11	9	15	11	(5)	-
5	Marc Girardelli	Luxembourg	65	-	-	-	-	20	-	20	25
6	Markus Wasmeier	West Germany	59	-	(1)	15	11	8	10	15	-
7	Ingemar Stenmark	Sweden	58	-	12	9	10	12	15	(8)	(9)
8	Robert Erlacher	Italy	57	8	10	(4)	20	(6)	7	12	-
9	Alberto Tomba	Italy	52	-	20	3	6	-	-	11	12
10	Helmut Mayer	Austria	39	-	-	2	12	7	-	7	11

=== Slalom ===
see complete table

In Men's Slalom World Cup 1986/87 the best five results count. Five racers had a point deduction, which are given in ().

Place	Name	Country	Total	3	10	12	13	19	23	25	33
1	Bojan Križaj	Yugoslavia	105	(12)	(12)	25	20	15	25	(8)	20
2	Ingemar Stenmark	Sweden	96	25	20	15	-	11	(10)	25	-
3	Armin Bittner	West Germany	78	(5)	9	-	25	(5)	15	20	9
4	Joël Gaspoz	Switzerland	71	11	15	-	12	25	8	-	(7)
5	Grega Benedik	Yugoslavia	55	10	-	6	8	-	-	6	25
6	Mathias Berthold	Austria	54	(2)	-	10	5	8	20	(2)	11
7	Dietmar Köhlbichler	Austria	52	-	-	5	9	20	7	11	-
8	Günther Mader	Austria	42	-	11	12	-	4	-	15	-
9	Didier Bouvet	France	41	-	-	8	6	12	-	-	15
10	Jonas Nilsson	Sweden	35	20	-	11	-	-	-	-	4

=== Combined ===
In Men's Combined World Cup 1986/87 both results count. Only two racers scored points (Wengen and Kitzbuhel). Points were only awarded to athletes, who were able to finish in both events (downhill and slalom) in top thirty.

Place	Name	Country	Total	20	24
1	Pirmin Zurbriggen	Switzerland	50	25	25
2	Andreas Wenzel	Liechtenstein	20	-	20

== Ladies ==
=== Overall ===
see complete table

In Women's Overall World Cup 1986/87 the best four downhills, the best four Super Gs, best four giant slaloms, best four slaloms and the only combined count. 26 racers had a point deduction. Swiss athletes took the first five places.

Place	Name	Country	Total	DH	SG	GS	SL	KB
1	Maria Walliser	Switzerland	269	75	82	100	0	12
2	Vreni Schneider	Switzerland	262	23	41	100	78	20
3	Brigitte Oertli	Switzerland	206	30	46	38	67	25
4	Erika Hess	Switzerland	169	3	13	53	85	15
5	Michela Figini	Switzerland	162	86	27	49	0	0
6	Tamara McKinney	United States	127	0	7	30	90	0
7	Mateja Svet	Yugoslavia	126	0	27	51	48	0
8	Blanca Fernández Ochoa	Spain	121	0	30	67	24	0
9	Sigrid Wolf	Austria	119	61	35	23	0	0
10	Catherine Quittet	France	118	31	57	30	0	0
	Marina Kiehl	West Germany	118	30	52	36	0	0
12	Corinne Schmidhauser	Switzerland	112	0	0	17	95	0
13	Michaela Gerg	West Germany	109	25	39	45	0	0
14	Anita Wachter	Austria	107	12	47	12	36	0
15	Laurie Graham	Canada	76	76	0	0	0	0
16	Elisabeth Kirchler	Austria	74	32	26	16	0	0
17	Regine Mösenlechner	West Germany	69	59	10	0	0	0
18	Camilla Nilsson	Sweden	67	0	0	9	58	0
19	Sylvia Eder	Austria	63	10	18	25	0	10
20	Roswitha Steiner	Austria	62	0	0	0	62	0

=== Downhill ===
see complete table

In Women's Downhill World Cup 1986/87 the best five results count. Four racer had a point deduction, which are given in ().

Place	Name	Country	Total	5	6	15	18	26	27	28
1	Michela Figini	Switzerland	93	25	-	11	25	25	7	-
2	Maria Walliser	Switzerland	90	20	20	20	15	(12)	(10)	15
3	Laurie Graham	Canada	86	11	25	10	(6)	20	(8)	20
4	Regine Mösenlechner	West Germany	71	(8)	(8)	12	20	15	12	12
5	Sigrid Wolf	Austria	61	-	-	-	-	11	25	25
6	Marina Kiehl	West Germany	35	5	6	-	10	9	5	-
7	Brigitte Oertli	Switzerland	33	3	(1)	8	4	-	9	9
8	Elisabeth Kirchler	Austria	32	-	-	-	1	-	20	11
9	Catherine Quittet	France	31	6	15	2	8	-	-	-
10	Beatrice Gafner	Switzerland	30	-	-	25	-	-	-	5

=== Super G ===
see complete table

In Women's Super G World Cup 1986/87 all five results count.

Place	Name	Country	Total	7	14	19	29	30
1	Maria Walliser	Switzerland	82	25	25	7	-	25
2	Catherine Quittet	France	57	20	12	25	-	-
3	Marina Kiehl	West Germany	52	-	11	15	25	1
4	Brigitte Oertli	Switzerland	49	5	20	3	10	11
5	Anita Wachter	Austria	47	9	3	-	20	15
6	Vreni Schneider	Switzerland	44	15	6	10	3	10
7	Michaela Gerg	West Germany	43	11	10	4	12	6
8	Sigrid Wolf	Austria	35	-	-	-	15	20
9	Traudl Hächer	West Germany	31	4	4	20	3	-
	Blanca Fernández Ochoa	Spain	31	10	1	1	7	12

=== Giant Slalom ===
see complete table

In Women's Giant Slalom World Cup 1986/87 the best five results count. Six racers had a point deduction, which are given in (). Vreni Schneider and Maria Walliser tied in the last race at Sarajevo and each finished with 120 points and identical tiebreakers (each had four victories (first tiebreaker) and 15 points as the sixth result (second tiebreaker)). Thus, they also shared the Giant Slalom discipline trophy. As a consequence, the scoring procedures were changed for the next season to remove the limitation on the number of results that would count; all results would count beginning with the 1987/88 season.

Place	Name	Country	Total	1	4	10	13	20	21	24	31
1	Vreni Schneider	Switzerland	120	(15)	25	(12)	25	20	25	-	25
	Maria Walliser	Switzerland	120	-	20	25	(15)	25	(15)	25	25
3	Blanca Fernández Ochoa	Spain	78	(6)	(10)	20	11	(10)	20	15	12
4	Erika Hess	Switzerland	62	11	11	9	(9)	-	11	20	(7)
5	Michela Figini	Switzerland	55	12	-	15	6	-	(6)	7	15
6	Mateja Svet	Yugoslavia	51	20	-	-	20	11	-	-	-
7	Michaela Gerg	West Germany	48	25	-	3	8	-	7	5	-
8	Marina Kiehl	West Germany	42	-	(4)	6	(5)	8	10	12	6
	Brigitte Oertli	Switzerland	42	-	-	11	8	15	4	-	4
10	Catherine Quittet	France	30	10	-	7	-	1	12	-	-

=== Slalom ===
see complete table

In Women's Slalom World Cup 1986/87 the best five results count. Ten racers had a point deduction, which are given in ().

Place	Name	Country	Total	2	3	8	9	11	12	16	22	23	25
1	Corinne Schmidhauser	Switzerland	110	25	-	(10)	(12)	(6)	15	(6)	20	25	25
2	Tamara McKinney	United States	99	20	-	20	25	-	-	25	9	-	-
3	Erika Hess	Switzerland	96	(4)	25	(7)	(3)	25	11	(9)	(8)	15	20
4	Vreni Schneider	Switzerland	84	6	-	25	8	-	20	(4)	25	-	-
5	Brigitte Oertli	Switzerland	77	-	20	15	10	20	-	12	(5)	(10)	-
6	Roswitha Steiner	Austria	74	15	-	(11)	20	-	-	-	12	12	15
7	Monika Maierhofer	Austria	67	11	-	(8)	15	-	10	-	11	20	-
8	Camilla Nilsson	Sweden	66	10	(4)	(5)	(7)	-	25	11	(7)	8	12
9	Mateja Svet	Yugoslavia	55	8	8	-	-	-	12	20	(6)	-	7
10	Karin Buder	Austria	53	12	15	(4)	-	11	-	-	-	5	10

=== Combined ===
see complete table

In Women's Combined World Cup 1986/87 only one competition was held. Points were only awarded to athletes, who were able to finish in both events (downhill and slalom) in top thirty.

Place	Name	Country	Total	17
1	Brigitte Oertli	Switzerland	25	25
2	Vreni Schneider	Switzerland	20	20
3	Erika Hess	Switzerland	15	15
4	Maria Walliser	Switzerland	12	12
5	Karen Percy	Canada	11	11
6	Sylvia Eder	Austria	10	10

== Nations Cup ==
=== Overall ===
Place	Country	Total	Men	Ladies
1	Switzerland	2952	1270	1682
2	Austria	1691	913	778
3	West Germany	1072	572	500
4	Italy	787	666	121
5	Yugoslavia	398	245	153
6	Sweden	376	245	131
7	Canada	333	125	208
8	France	317	73	244
9	United States	282	35	247
10	Luxembourg	202	202	0
11	Spain	159	0	159
12	Liechtenstein	91	91	0
13	Norway	36	36	0
14	Japan	19	19	0
15	Czechoslovakia	16	0	16
	Netherlands	16	0	16
17	United Kingdom	10	10	0
18	Bulgaria	2	2	0

=== Men ===
Place	Country	Total	DH	SG	GS	SL	KB	Racers	Wins
1	Switzerland	1270	674	146	306	94	50	15	18
2	Austria	913	311	144	198	260	0	24	0
3	Italy	666	151	133	267	115	0	16	3
4	West Germany	572	148	146	144	134	0	13	4
5	Yugoslavia	245	0	0	21	224	0	5	3
	Sweden	245	2	0	81	162	0	7	2
7	Luxembourg	202	62	65	65	10	0	1	3
8	Canada	125	112	13	0	0	0	6	1
9	Liechtenstein	91	0	34	15	22	20	3	0
10	France	73	6	12	9	46	0	5	0
11	Norway	36	23	0	0	13	0	3	0
12	United States	35	23	0	2	10	0	5	0
13	Japan	19	7	0	0	12	0	2	0
14	United Kingdom	10	10	0	0	0	0	1	0
15	Bulgaria	2	0	0	0	2	0	1	0

=== Ladies ===
Place	Country	Total	DH	SG	GS	SL	KB	Racers	Wins
1	Switzerland	1682	359	220	519	512	72	14	23
2	Austria	778	173	126	93	376	10	19	2
3	West Germany	500	187	152	152	9	0	12	2
4	United States	247	56	18	61	112	0	6	2
5	France	244	34	62	73	75	0	7	1
6	Canada	208	144	36	17	0	11	6	1
7	Spain	159	0	31	104	24	0	1	0
8	Yugoslavia	153	0	27	54	72	0	3	0
9	Sweden	131	0	0	15	116	0	4	1
10	Italy	121	17	23	13	68	0	7	0
11	Czechoslovakia	16	0	0	0	16	0	2	0
	Netherlands	16	0	0	11	5	0	1	0
