= 1988 Alpine Skiing World Cup – Women's downhill =

1988 Women's downhill World Cup
| Previous: 1987 | Next: 1989 |

Women's downhill World Cup 1987/1988

== Final point standings ==
In women's downhill World Cup 1987/88 all results count. Michela Figini won her third Downhill World Cup. Swiss athletes were able to win all races.

| Place | Name | Country | Total points | 4 (France) | 5 (France) | 6 (Switzerland) | 16 (Switzerland) | 17 (Switzerland) | 19 (Austria) | 24 (United States) | 27 (Canada) |
|---|---|---|---|---|---|---|---|---|---|---|---|
| 1 | Michela Figini | Switzerland | 143 | 20 | 7 | 25 | 25 | 20 | 12 | 9 | 25 |
| 2 | Brigitte Oertli | Switzerland | 119 | 11 | 3 | 15 | 10 | 15 | 20 | 25 | 20 |
| 3 | Maria Walliser | Switzerland | 82 | 25 | - | 10 | 12 | 25 | 10 | - | - |
| 4 | Veronika Wallinger | Austria | 59 | - | - | 3 | 3 | 12 | 15 | 11 | 15 |
| | Karen Percy | Canada | 59 | 7 | - | 8 | 20 | 6 | 7 | - | 11 |
| 6 | Sigrid Wolf | Austria | 55 | 3 | 9 | 20 | 11 | 7 | - | - | 5 |
| 7 | Beatrice Gafner | Switzerland | 43 | - | - | - | 9 | 9 | 25 | - | - |
| 8 | Marina Kiehl | West Germany | 40 | 10 | 20 | - | - | - | 10 | - | - |
| 9 | Regine Mösenlechner | West Germany | 38 | 5 | 5 | 5 | - | - | - | 20 | 3 |
| 10 | Petra Kronberger | Austria | 37 | - | - | 1 | 15 | - | 11 | - | 10 |
| | Kerrin Lee | Canada | 37 | 2 | 8 | - | - | 3 | 5 | 10 | 9 |
| | Laurie Graham | Canada | 37 | 12 | 2 | 11 | - | 10 | - | - | 2 |
| 13 | Katrin Gutensohn | Austria | 36 | - | - | - | 4 | 11 | 1 | 8 | 12 |
| | Chantal Bournissen | Switzerland | 36 | 6 | 25 | - | - | 1 | 3 | - | 1 |
| 15 | Elisabeth Kirchler | Austria | 31 | - | - | 12 | - | 8 | 4 | - | 7 |
| 16 | Heidi Zeller | Switzerland | 28 | 9 | - | 4 | - | - | - | 15 | - |
| 17 | Kellie Casey | Canada | 27 | 4 | 11 | - | - | 4 | 8 | - | - |
| 18 | Michaela Gerg | West Germany | 24 | 9 | - | 7 | 2 | 6 | - | - | - |
| 19 | Zoe Haas | Switzerland | 21 | 15 | - | - | - | - | 6 | - | - |
| 20 | Ulrike Stanggassinger | West Germany | 15 | - | 15 | - | - | - | - | - | - |
| 21 | Pam Fletcher | United States | 13 | - | 4 | - | 7 | - | 2 | - | - |
| 22 | Deborah Compagnoni | Italy | 12 | - | 12 | - | - | - | - | - | - |
| | Catherine Quittet | France | 12 | - | - | - | - | - | - | 12 | - |
| 24 | Golnur Postnikova | Soviet Union | 10 | - | 10 | - | - | - | - | - | - |
| | Carole Merle | France | 10 | - | - | - | 1 | 2 | - | 7 | - |
| | Karin Dedler | West Germany | 10 | - | - | 6 | - | - | - | 4 | - |
| 27 | Sylvia Eder | Austria | 9 | - | - | 9 | - | - | - | - | - |
| 28 | Anita Wachter | Austria | 8 | - | - | - | 8 | - | - | - | - |
| | Christine Zangerl | Austria | 8 | - | - | - | - | - | - | - | 8 |
| 30 | Lucie Laroche | Canada | 7 | - | - | - | - | - | - | 1 | 6 |
| 31 | Olga Kurdachenko | Soviet Union | 6 | - | 6 | - | - | - | - | - | - |
| | Hilary Lindh | United States | 6 | - | - | - | 6 | - | - | - | - |
| | Michaela Marzola | Italy | 6 | - | - | - | - | - | - | 6 | - |
| 34 | Tanja Steinebrunner | Switzerland | 5 | - | - | - | 5 | - | - | - | - |
| | Adele Allender | United States | 5 | - | - | - | - | - | - | 5 | - |
| | Edith Thys | United States | 5 | - | - | - | - | 1 | - | - | 4 |
| 37 | Heidi Zurbriggen | Switzerland | 4 | - | 2 | 2 | - | - | - | - | - |
| 38 | Marlis Spescha | Switzerland | 3 | - | - | - | - | - | - | 3 | - |
| | Christina Meier | West Germany | 3 | 1 | - | - | - | - | - | 2 | - |

Alpine skiing World Cup
Women

Overall | Downhill | Super-G | Giant | Slalom | Combined

1988
