= 1987 Alpine Skiing World Cup – Men's slalom =

1987 Men's Slalom World Cup
Previous: 1986	Next: 1988

Men's slalom World Cup 1986/1987

== Final point standings ==
In men's slalom World Cup 1986/87 the best five results count. Five racers had a point deduction, which are given in ().

Place	Name	Country	Total points	Deduction	3 (Italy)	10 (Italy)	12 (Socialist Federal Republic of Yugoslavia)	13 (Austria)	19 (Switzerland)	23 (Austria)	25 (France)	33 (Socialist Federal Republic of Yugoslavia)
1	Bojan Križaj	Yugoslavia	105	(32)	(12)	(12)	25	20	15	25	(8)	20
2	Ingemar Stenmark	Sweden	96	(10)	25	20	15	-	11	(10)	25	-
3	Armin Bittner	West Germany	78	(10)	(5)	9	-	25	(5)	15	20	9
4	Joël Gaspoz	Switzerland	71	(7)	11	15	-	12	25	8	-	(7)
5	Grega Benedik	Yugoslavia	55		10	-	6	8	-	-	6	25
6	Mathias Berthold	Austria	54	(4)	(2)	-	10	5	8	20	(2)	11
7	Dietmar Köhlbichler	Austria	52		-	-	5	9	20	7	11	-
8	Günther Mader	Austria	42		-	11	12	-	4	-	15	-
9	Didier Bouvet	France	41		-	-	8	6	12	-	-	15
10	Jonas Nilsson	Sweden	35		20	-	11	-	-	-	-	4
11	Rok Petrović	Yugoslavia	32		-	-	20	7	-	-	5	-
12	Rudolf Nierlich	Austria	29		8	-	-	-	9	12	-	-
13	Ivano Edalini	Italy	26		-	25	-	-	-	1	-	-
	Bernhard Gstrein	Austria	26		-	-	2	1	-	11	12	-
	Richard Pramotton	Italy	26		15	-	-	10	-	-	-	1
16	Oswald Tötsch	Italy	24		9	-	-	15	-	-	-	-
	Frank Wörndl	West Germany	24		6	-	7	11	-	-	-	-
18	Thomas Stangassinger	Austria	18		4	-	-	4	-	-	-	10
19	Johan Wallner	Sweden	17		-	10	-	-	7	-	-	-
20	Christian Orlainsky	Austria	15		1	-	9	-	3	2	-	-
21	Pirmin Zurbriggen	Switzerland	14		-	8	-	-	6	-	-	-
22	Carlo Gerosa	Italy	13		-	4	-	-	-	-	9	-
	Peter Roth	West Germany	13		-	-	-	-	-	-	7	6
24	Alberto Tomba	Italy	12		-	-	-	2	10	-	-	-
	Hubert Strolz	Austria	12		3	-	-	-	-	9	-	-
	Tetsuya Okabe	Japan	12		-	-	-	-	-	-	-	12
	Paul Frommelt	Liechtenstein	12		-	-	-	-	-	-	4	8
28	Marc Girardelli	Luxembourg	10		-	-	-	-	-	-	10	-
	Andreas Wenzel	Liechtenstein	10		-	-	4	-	-	6	-	-
	Roberto Grigis	Italy	10		7	-	-	-	-	-	-	3
31	Finn Christian Jagge	Norway	7		-	7	-	-	-	-	-	-
	Felix McGrath	United States	7		-	-	3	-	-	4	-	-
33	Ole Kristian Furuseth	Norway	6		-	6	-	-	-	-	-	-
34	Stephan Pistor	West Germany	5		-	5	-	-	-	-	-	-
	Daniel Mougel	France	5		-	-	-	-	-	5	-	-
	Michael Tritscher	Austria	5		-	-	-	-	-	-	-	5
37	Florian Beck	West Germany	3		-	3	-	-	-	-	-	-
	Bob Ormsby	United States	3		-	-	-	3	-	-	-	-
	Roland Pfeifer	Austria	3		-	-	-	-	-	3	-	-
	Niklas Lindqvist	Sweden	3		-	-	-	-	-	-	3	-
41	Petar Popangelov	Bulgaria	2		-	2	-	-	-	-	-	-
	Christian Gaidet	France	2		-	-	-	-	2	-	-	-
	Marco Tonazzi	Italy	2		-	-	-	-	-	-	-	2
44	Gunnar Neuriesser	Sweden	1		-	1	-	-	-	-	-	-
	Heinz Holzer	Italy	1		-	-	1	-	-	-	-	-
	Konrad Ladstätter	Italy	1		-	-	-	-	1	-	-	-
	Markus Wasmeier	West Germany	1		-	-	-	-	-	-	1	-

Alpine skiing World Cup
Men

Overall | Downhill | Super G | Giant | Slalom | Combined

1987
