= 1987 Alpine Skiing World Cup – Women's downhill =

1987 Women's downhill World Cup
Previous: 1986	Next: 1988

Women's downhill World Cup 1987/1988

== Final point standings ==
In Women' downhill World Cup 1986/87 the best 5 results count. Deductions are given in ().

Place	Name	Country	Total points	Deduction	5 (France)	6 (France)	15 (Austria)	18 (Germany)	26 (Canada)	27 (United States)	28 (United States)
1	Michela Figini	Switzerland	93		25	-	11	25	25	7	-
2	Maria Walliser	Switzerland	90	(22)	20	20	20	15	(12)	(10)	15
3	Laurie Graham	Canada	86	(14)	11	25	10	(6)	20	(8)	20
4	Regine Mösenlechner	West Germany	71	(16)	(8)	(8)	12	20	15	12	12
5	Sigrid Wolf	Austria	61		-	-	-	-	11	25	25
6	Marina Kiehl	West Germany	35		5	6	-	10	9	5	-
7	Brigitte Oertli	Switzerland	33	(1)	3	(1)	8	4	-	9	9
8	Elisabeth Kirchler	Austria	32		-	-	-	1	-	20	11
9	Catherine Quittet	France	31		6	15	2	8	-	-	-
10	Beatrice Gafner	Switzerland	30		-	-	25	-	-	-	5
11	Michaela Gerg	West Germany	27		4	7	-	11	2	3	-
12	Debbie Armstrong	United States	26		10	12	4	-	-	-	-
13	Heidi Zurbriggen	Switzerland	25		15	6	-	-	-	-	4
14	Liisa Savijarvi	Canada	23		-	11	5	7	-	-	-
	Vreni Schneider	Switzerland	23		-	-	6	-	-	11	6
16	Sieglinde Winkler	Austria	22		-	-	15	-	7	-	-
17	Katrin Gutensohn	Austria	21		12	-	9	-	-	-	-
18	Pam Fletcher	United States	20		-	-	-	5	-	15	-
19	Heidi Zeller	Switzerland	19		9	3	7	-	-	-	-
20	Karen Percy	Canada	18		7	-	1	-	7	2	1
21	Karla Delago	Italy	17		1	4	-	3	5	4	-
22	Karin Dedler	West Germany	13		-	-	-	3	-	-	10
23	Zoe Haas	Switzerland	12		-	-	-	12	-	-	-
	Anita Wachter	Austria	12		-	-	-	-	4	-	8
25	Christina Meier	West Germany	11		2	9	-	-	-	-	-
	Heidi Wiesler	West Germany	11		-	-	-	9	2	-	-
27	Tori Pillinger	United States	10		-	10	-	-	-	-	-
28	Sylvia Eder	Austria	10		-	-	-	-	10	-	-
29	Marlis Spescha	Switzerland	8		-	-	-	-	8	-	-
30	Christina Zangerl	Austria	7		-	-	-	-	-	-	7
31	Veronika Wallinger	Austria	6		-	-	-	-	-	6	-
32	Erika Hess	Switzerland	3		-	-	3	-	-	-	-
	Claudine Emonet	France	3		-	2	-	-	-	1	-
	Miriam Vogt	West Germany	3		-	-	-	-	-	-	3
	Kerrin Lee	Canada	3		-	-	-	-	3	-	-
36	Barbara Sadleder	Austria	2		-	-	-	-	-	-	2

== Women's Downhill Team Results ==
All points are shown including individual deduction. bold indicates highest score - italics indicates race wins

Place	Country	Total points	5 (France)	6 (France)	15 (Austria)	18 (Germany)	26 (Canada)	27 (United States)	28 (United States)	Racers	Wins
1	Switzerland	359	72	30	**80**	56	45	37	39	10	4
2	West Germany	187	19	30	12	53	28	20	25	7	0
3	Austria	173	12	-	24	1	32	51	53	9	2
4	Canada	144	18	36	16	13	30	10	21	4	1
5	United States	56	10	22	4	5	-	15	-	3	0
6	France	34	6	17	2	8	-	1	-	2	0
7	Italy	17	1	4	-	3	5	4	-	1	0

**Alpine skiing World Cup**
**Women**

Overall | Downhill | Super-G | Giant slalom | Slalom | Combined

**1987**
