= 1988 Alpine Skiing World Cup – Women's super-G =

1988 Women's super-G World Cup
Previous: 1987	Next: 1989

Women's super-G World Cup 1987/1988

== Final point standings ==
In women's super-G World Cup 1987/88 all four results count.

Place	Name	Country	Total points	2 (Italy)	7 (Switzerland)	15 (Austria)	28 (Canada)
1	Michela Figini	Switzerland	65	-	25	15	25
2	Sylvia Eder	Austria	45	15	20	-	10
3	Regine Mösenlechner	West Germany	40	4	15	9	12
	Blanca Fernández Ochoa	Spain	40	10	11	11	8
5	Sigrid Wolf	Austria	36	25	-	-	11
6	Ulrike Maier	Austria	34	-	4	10	20
7	Michaela Gerg	West Germany	32	12	8	12	-
8	Catherine Quittet	France	26	-	-	20	6
9	Zoe Haas	Switzerland	25	-	-	25	-
10	Mateja Svet	Yugoslavia	24	20	-	4	-
11	Anita Wachter	Austria	22	1	6	-	15
12	Christa Kinshofer	West Germany	16	8	1	7	-
13	Petra Kronberger	Austria	15	-	-	6	9
	Karin Dedler	West Germany	15	-	10	-	5
	Karen Percy	Canada	15	-	12	-	3
16	Elisabeth Kirchler	Austria	14	5	9	-	-
17	Edith Thys	United States	12	9	-	3	-
	Deborah Compagnoni	Italy	12	11	-	1	-
	Brigitte Oertli	Switzerland	12	-	-	8	4
20	Heidi Zeller	Switzerland	10	-	7	3	-
	Marina Kiehl	West Germany	10	3	-	-	7
22	Vreni Schneider	Switzerland	9	6	3	-	-
23	Traudl Hächer	West Germany	7	7	-	-	-
24	Miriam Vogt	West Germany	5	-	5	-	-
	Maria Walliser	Switzerland	5	-	-	5	-
26	Kerrin Lee	Canada	2	2	-	-	-
	Laurie Graham	Canada	2	-	2	-	-
	Michaela Marzola	Italy	2	-	-	-	2
29	Katrin Gutensohn	Austria	1	-	-	-	1

Alpine skiing World Cup
Women

Overall | Downhill | Super G | Giant slalom | Slalom | Combined

1988
