= 1986 Alpine Skiing World Cup – Men's super-G =

1986 Men's super-G World Cup
Previous: 1985 (giant/super-G)	Next: 1987

Men's super-G World Cup 1985/1986

This was the first ever super-G World Cup.

== Calendar ==
Round	Race No	Place	Country	Date	Winner	Second	Third
1	23	Crans Montana	Switzerland	February 3, 1986	(Switzerland) Peter Müller	(Switzerland) Pirmin Zurbriggen	(West Germany) Markus Wasmeier
2	25	Crans Montana	Switzerland	February 5, 1986	(Luxembourg) Marc Girardelli	(West Germany) Markus Wasmeier	(Switzerland) Peter Müller
3	29	Morzine	France	February 9, 1986	(West Germany) Markus Wasmeier	(Luxembourg) Marc Girardelli	(Austria) Hubert Strolz
4	38	Hemsedal	Norway	February 28, 1986	(Switzerland) Pirmin Zurbriggen	(West Germany) Markus Wasmeier	(Austria) Leonhard Stock
5	43	Whistler Mountain	Canada	March 16, 1986	(West Germany) Markus Wasmeier	(Switzerland) Martin Hangl	(West Germany) Peter Roth

== Final point standings ==
In Men's super-G World Cup 1985/86 all 5 results count.

Place	Name	Country	Total points	23 (Switzerland)	25 (Switzerland)	29 (France)	38 (Norway)	43 (Canada)
1	Markus Wasmeier	West Germany	105	15	20	25	20	25
2	Pirmin Zurbriggen	Switzerland	67	20	5	10	25	7
3	Marc Girardelli	Luxembourg	56	-	25	20	11	-
4	Leonhard Stock	Austria	52	9	11	8	15	9
5	Peter Müller	Switzerland	40	25	15	-	-	-
6	Martin Hangl	Switzerland	34	6	1	7	-	20
7	Michael Eder	West Germany	30	-	11	5	3	11
8	Hubert Strolz	Austria	29	7	7	15	-	-
	Hans Enn	Austria	29	-	6	11	-	12
10	Franz Heinzer	Switzerland	24	12	12	-	-	-
11	Günther Mader	Austria	22	-	4	12	2	4
12	Robert Erlacher	Italy	21	-	-	3	9	9
13	Karl Alpiger	Switzerland	20	11	9	-	-	-
	Hans Stuffer	West Germany	20	-	-	9	10	1
15	Peter Roth	West Germany	19	-	-	4	-	15
16	Josef Schick	West Germany	16	8	8	-	-	-
17	Herbert Renoth	West Germany	14	-	-	-	12	2
18	Richard Pramotton	Italy	13	-	-	6	7	-
19	Michael Mair	Italy	10	10	-	-	-	-
	Alberto Tomba	Italy	10	-	-	-	-	10
	Franck Piccard	France	10	3	2	-	-	5
22	Andreas Wenzel	Liechtenstein	8	-	-	-	8	-
	Günther Marxer	Liechtenstein	8	-	4	-	4	-
24	Anton Steiner	Austria	6	-	-	-	6	-
	Thomas Bürgler	Switzerland	6	-	-	-	-	6
26	Gerhard Pfaffenbichler	Austria	5	5	-	-	-	-
	Daniel Mahrer	Switzerland	5	-	-	-	5	-
28	Sepp Wildgruber	West Germany	4	4	-	-	-	-
	Guido Hinterseer	Austria	4	-	-	-	-	4
30	Stefan Niederseer	Austria	3	3	-	-	-	-
	Ivano Marzola	Italy	3	-	-	2	1	-
32	Heinz Holzer	Italy	2	-	-	2	-	-
33	Konrad Walk	Austria	1	1	-	-	-	-

Alpine skiing World Cup
Men

Overall | Downhill | Super-G | Giant | Slalom | Combined

1986
