= 1987 Alpine Skiing World Cup – Women's super-G =

1987 Women's super-G World Cup
Previous: 1986	Next: 1988

Women's super-G World Cup 1987/1988

== Final point standings ==
In women's super-G World Cup 1986/87 all 5 results count.

Place	Name	Country	Total points	7 (France)	14 (Austria)	19 (Germany)	29 (United States)	30 (United States)
1	Maria Walliser	Switzerland	82	25	25	7	-	25
2	Catherine Quittet	France	57	20	12	25	-	-
3	Marina Kiehl	West Germany	52	-	11	15	25	1
4	Brigitte Oertli	Switzerland	49	5	20	3	10	11
5	Anita Wachter	Austria	47	9	3	-	20	15
6	Vreni Schneider	Switzerland	44	15	6	10	3	10
7	Michaela Gerg	West Germany	43	11	10	4	12	6
8	Sigrid Wolf	Austria	35	-	-	-	15	20
9	Traudl Hächer	West Germany	31	4	4	20	3	-
	Blanca Fernández Ochoa	Spain	31	10	1	1	7	12
11	Mateja Svet	Yugoslavia	27	-	15	12	-	-
	Michela Figini	Switzerland	27	12	2	-	6	7
13	Elisabeth Kirchler	Austria	26	-	7	-	11	8
14	Karen Percy	Canada	21	-	-	8	8	5
15	Michaela Marzola	Italy	20	-	9	11	-	-
16	Sylvia Eder	Austria	18	8	8	-	-	2
17	Christina Meier	West Germany	16	7	-	-	-	9
18	Erika Hess	Switzerland	13	-	-	-	9	4
19	Regine Mösenlechner	West Germany	10	-	-	5	5	-
20	Liisa Savijarvi	Canada	9	-	-	9	-	-
	Debbie Armstrong	United States	9	-	5	-	4	-
22	Tamara McKinney	United States	7	7	-	-	-	-
23	Diane Haight	Canada	6	-	-	6	-	-
24	Zoe Haas	Switzerland	5	-	-	2	-	3
25	Anne Flore Rey	France	3	3	-	-	-	-
	Karla Delago	Italy	3	-	-	-	3	-
27	Malgorzata Mogore-Tlalka	France	2	2	-	-	-	-
	Tori Pillinger	United States	2	2	-	-	-	-

== Women's Super-G Team Results ==
All points were shown. bold indicate highest score - italics indicate race wins

Place	Country	Total points	7 (France)	14 (Austria)	19 (Germany)	29 (United States)	30 (United States)	Racers	Wins
1	Switzerland	220	57	53	22	28	60	6	3
2	West Germany	152	22	25	44	45	16	5	1
3	Austria	126	17	18	-	46	45	4	0
4	France	62	25	12	25	-	-	3	1
5	Canada	36	-	-	23	8	5	3	0
6	Spain	31	10	1	1	7	12	1	0
7	Yugoslavia	27	-	15	12	-	-	1	0
8	Italy	23	-	9	11	3	-	2	0
9	United States	18	9	5	-	4	-	3	0

**Alpine skiing World Cup**
**Women**

Overall | Downhill | Super-G | Giant slalom | Slalom | Combined

**1987**
