= Afritzer See =

- Lake Afritz
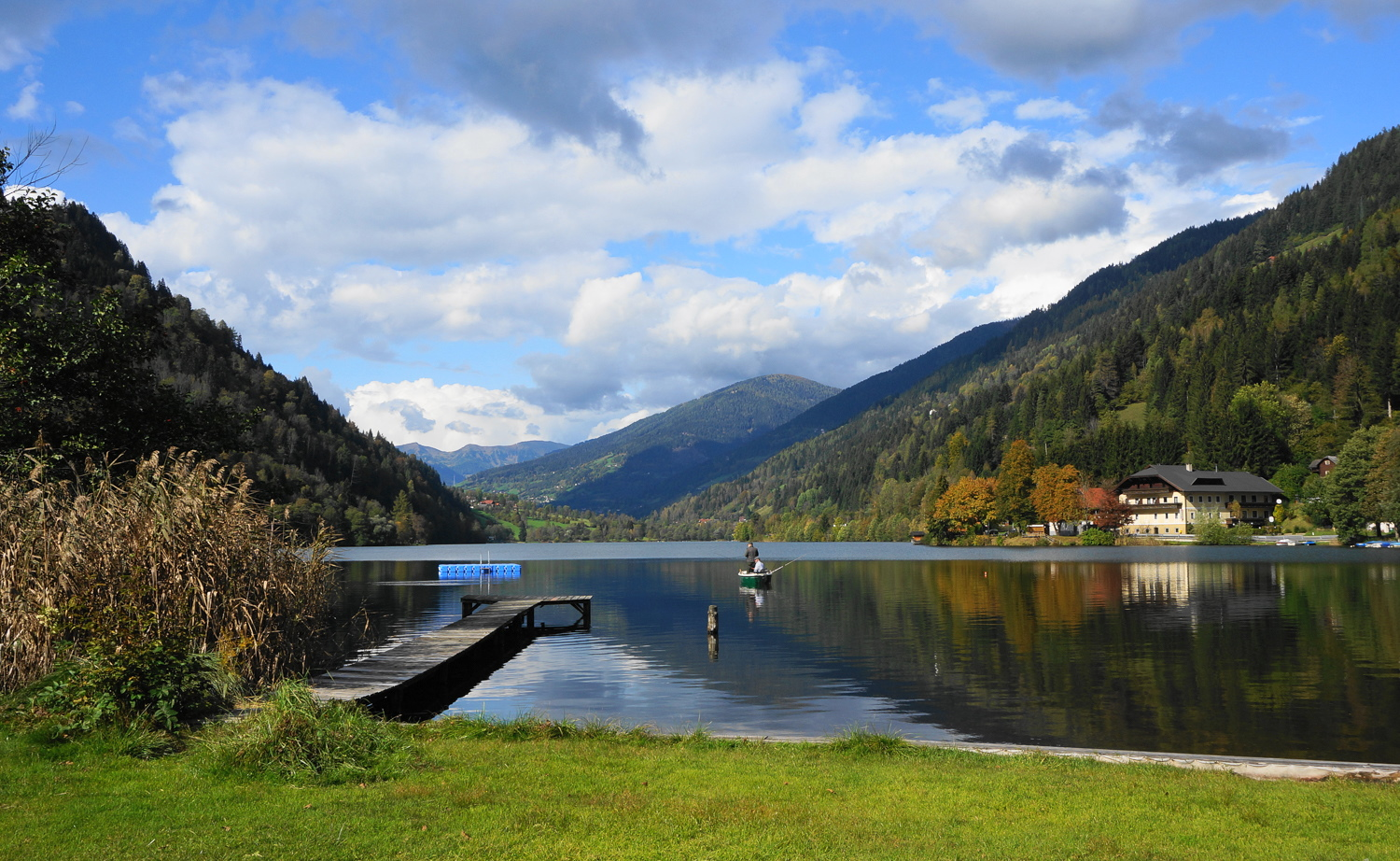
- View to the west

- Location within Austria
- Location: Carinthia
- Coordinates: 46°45′N 13°46′E
- Type: glacial lake
- Primary outflows: Afritzer Bach to Drava
- Catchment area: 8.67 km^{2} (3.35 sq mi)
- Basin countries: Austria
- Max. length: 1.5 km (0.93 mi)
- Max. width: 0.38 km (0.24 mi)
- Surface area: 49 ha (0.19 sq mi)
- Average depth: 14.2 m (47 ft)
- Max. depth: 22.5 m (74 ft)
- Water volume: 6,925,741 m^{3} (5,614.790 acre⋅ft)
- Residence time: 1.7 years
- Surface elevation: 752 m (2,467 ft)
- Settlements: Afritz, Feld am See

Afritzer See is a lake of Carinthia, Austria.

== Geography ==
The lake is situated in the Gegendtal Valley, running from east to west through the Nock Mountains range of the Gurktal Alps. Though the named after the settlement of Afritz on the eastern shore, the water is located within the municipal area of neighbouring Feld am See. A drainage divide separates it from the neighbouring Brennsee lake. Several brooks flow into Afritzer See, it empties via Afritzer Bach into the Drava river near Villach.

It is a popular bathing lake in summer, two public lidos and a camping site are located on the southern shore.
