= 1987 Alpine Skiing World Cup – Men's downhill =

1987 Men's Downhill World Cup
Previous: 1986	Next: 1988

Men's downhill World Cup 1986/1987

== Final point standings ==
In men's downhill World Cup 1986/87 the best 5 results count. 15 racers had a point deduction, which are given in (). Pirmin Zurbriggen won the cup with maximum points. Swiss athletes won 8 races out of 10.

Place	Name	Country	Total points	Deduction	1 (Argentina)	2 (Argentina)	5 (France)	7 (Italy)	14 (Switzerland)	15 (Germany)	18 (Switzerland)	22 (Austria)	27 (Japan)	29 (United States)	31 (Canada)
1	Pirmin Zurbriggen	Switzerland	125	(40)	(10)	25	25	(10)	(8)	25	(7)	25	-	25	(5)
2	Peter Müller	Switzerland	105	(48)	25	15	(11)	(11)	-	15	(11)	(15)	25	-	25
3	Franz Heinzer	Switzerland	90	(40)	15	15	(9)	(12)	25	-	15	(11)	-	(8)	20
4	Markus Wasmeier	West Germany	83	(22)	(6)	11	20	15	(6)	12	25	(10)	-	-	-
5	Michael Mair	Italy	82	(11)	-	-	15	20	(11)	20	-	-	15	12	-
6	Karl Alpiger	Switzerland	79	(35)	20	(10)	(4)	-	(9)	(5)	20	(7)	12	15	12
7	Daniel Mahrer	Switzerland	68	(23)	(7)	(9)	(1)	-	12	11	10	(6)	-	20	15
8	Rob Boyd	Canada	62	(5)	-	-	-	25	-	10	5	(5)	11	-	11
9	Peter Wirnsberger	Austria	57	(19)	8	8	-	(3)	20	(7)	9	12	(4)	(5)	-
10	Marc Girardelli	Luxembourg	56	(6)	12	6	-	-	7	(6)	-	-	20	11	-
	Leonhard Stock	Austria	56	(14)	11	20	(3)	6	-	(1)	(3)	9	(3)	(4)	10
12	Erwin Resch	Austria	52		5	-	8	-	15	4	-	20	-	-	-
13	Danilo Sbardellotto	Italy	36	(1)	3	-	-	-	10	4	12	(1)	-	-	7
	Helmut Höflehner	Austria	36	(4)	-	5	-	8	(4)	-	-	8	-	9	6
15	Sepp Wildgruber	West Germany	35	(2)	9	-	7	(1)	(1)	8	2	-	-	-	9
16	Stefan Niederseer	Austria	30	(1)	(1)	2	12	7	-	-	6	-	-	-	3
17	Atle Skårdal	Norway	23		4	-	5	6	-	-	-	-	-	-	8
18	Anton Steiner	Austria	20		-	4	-	-	2	-	1	3	-	10	-
19	Doug Lewis	United States	17		-	-	-	-	-	1	-	-	9	7	-
20	Brian Stemmle	Canada	15		-	-	-	9	3	-	-	-	-	-	3
21	Alberto Ghidoni	Italy	12		-	3	-	-	5	4	-	-	-	-	-
	Conradin Cathomen	Switzerland	12		-	-	2	6	-	-	-	4	-	-	-
23	Martin Bell	United Kingdom	10		-	-	10	-	-	-	-	-	-	-	-
	Rudolf Huber	Austria	10		-	-	-	-	-	-	-	-	10	-	-
	Gerhard Pfaffenbichler	Austria	10		-	-	-	-	-	-	8	-	-	2	-
26	Igor Cigolla	Italy	9		2	7	-	-	-	-	-	-	-	-	-
	Todd Brooker	Canada	9		-	-	-	-	-	9	-	-	-	-	-
28	Donald Stevens	Canada	8		-	-	-	-	-	-	-	-	8	-	-
	Gustav Oehrli	Switzerland	8		-	1	-	-	-	-	-	-	-	3	4
	Felix Belczyk	Canada	8		-	-	-	-	-	-	-	-	1	6	1
31	Hiroyuki Aihara	Japan	7		-	-	-	-	-	-	-	-	7	-	-
32	Jean-François Rey	France	6		-	-	6	-	-	-	-	-	-	-	-
	Klaus Gattermann	West Germany	6		-	-	-	-	-	-	-	-	6	-	-
34	Mike Carney	Canada	5		-	-	-	-	-	-	-	-	5	-	-
35	Mike Brown	United States	4		-	-	-	-	-	-	4	-	-	-	-
36	Niklas Henning	Sweden	2		-	-	-	2	-	-	-	-	-	-	-
	Roman Rupp	Austria	2		-	-	-	-	-	-	-	2	-	-	-
	Jeff Olson	United States	2		-	-	-	-	-	-	-	-	2	-	-
39	Bernhard Fahner	Switzerland	1		-	-	-	-	-	-	-	-	-	1	-

Alpine skiing World Cup
Men

Overall | Downhill | Super G | Giant | Slalom | Combined

1987
