= Kristi Terzian =

American alpine skier (born 1967)

Kristi Terzian (born April 22, 1967 in Sanger, California) is an American retired alpine skier.
