= Feld am See =

- Municipality
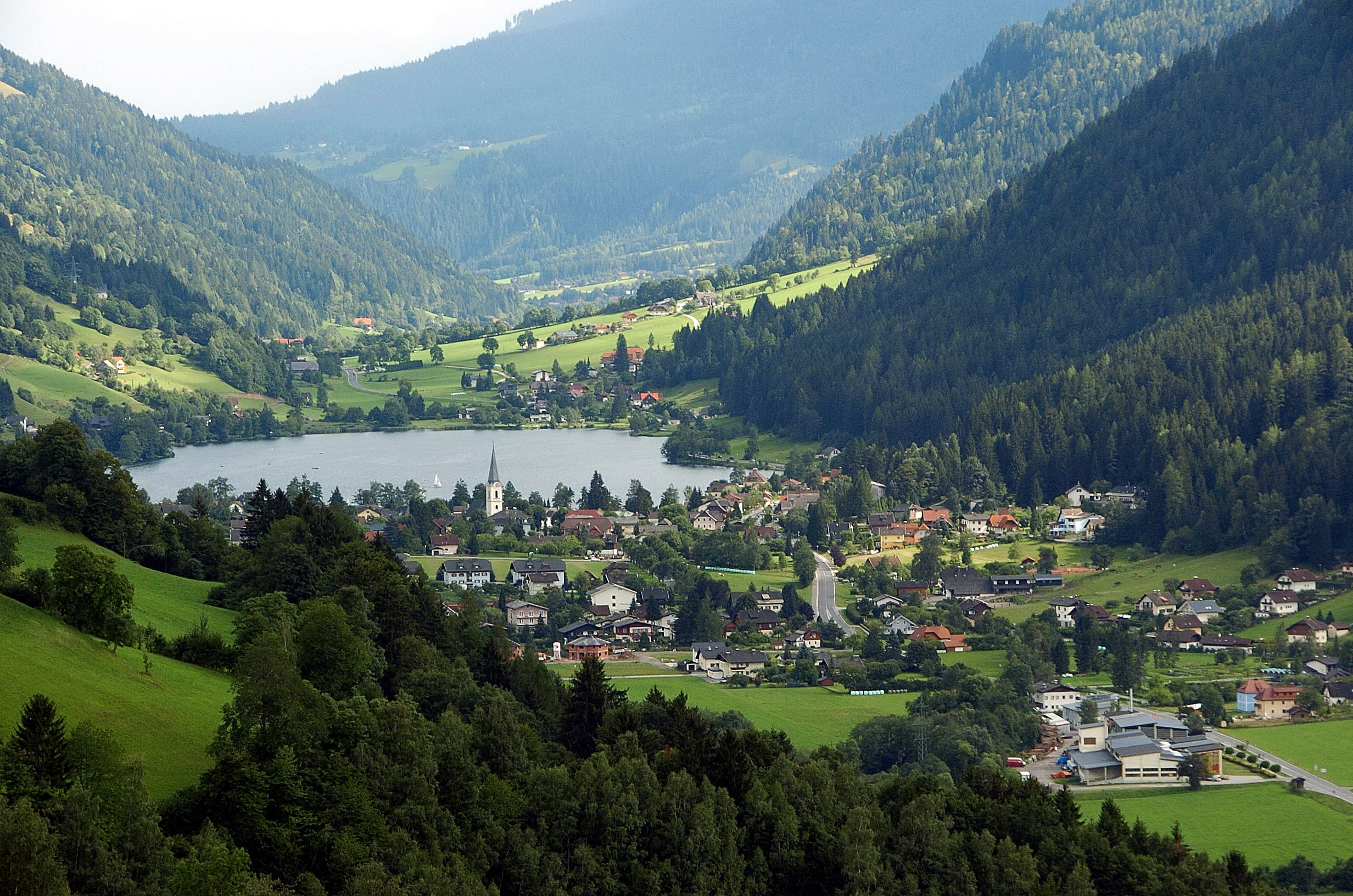
- Gegend valley with Feld am See

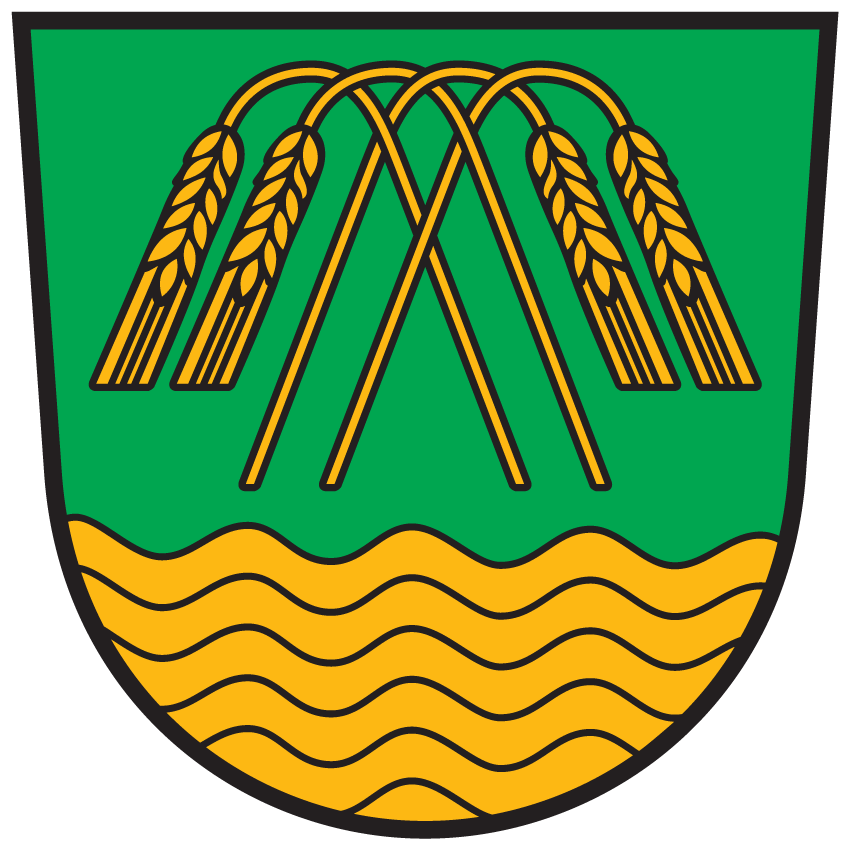
- Coat of arms

- Location within Austria
- Coordinates: 46°47′N 13°45′E
- Country: Austria
- State: Carinthia
- District: Villach-Land

Government
  - Mayor: Michaela Oberlassnig (SPÖ)

Area
  - Total: 33.67 km^{2} (13.00 sq mi)
- Elevation: 751 m (2,464 ft)

Population (2018-01-01)
  - Total: 1,094
  - Density: 32.49/km^{2} (84.15/sq mi)
- Time zone: UTC+1 (CET)
  - Summer (DST): UTC+2 (CEST)
- Postal code: 9544
- Area code: 04246
- Website: http://www.feld-am-see.gv.at/

Feld am See is a municipality in the district of Villach-Land in the Austrian state of Carinthia.

== Geography ==
It is located in the Gegend valley of the Nock Mountains range at the shore of the Brennsee (or Feldsee), between the Mirnock massif in the southwest (el. 2,110 m (6,920 ft)) and Wöllaner Nock (2,145 m (7,037 ft)) in the northeast. The municipal area consists of one cadastral community, Rauth, also the oldest settlement in the area.

=== Neighboring municipalities ===
Radenthein	Bad Kleinkirchheim
Ferndorf
Fresach	Afritz am See

=== Population ===
The census in 2001 counted 1,188 inhabitants. 66.0% are Protestants (whole Carinthia: 10.3%), 27.5% are Roman Catholics, 0.8% are Muslims and 5.1% belong to other denominations.

== History ==
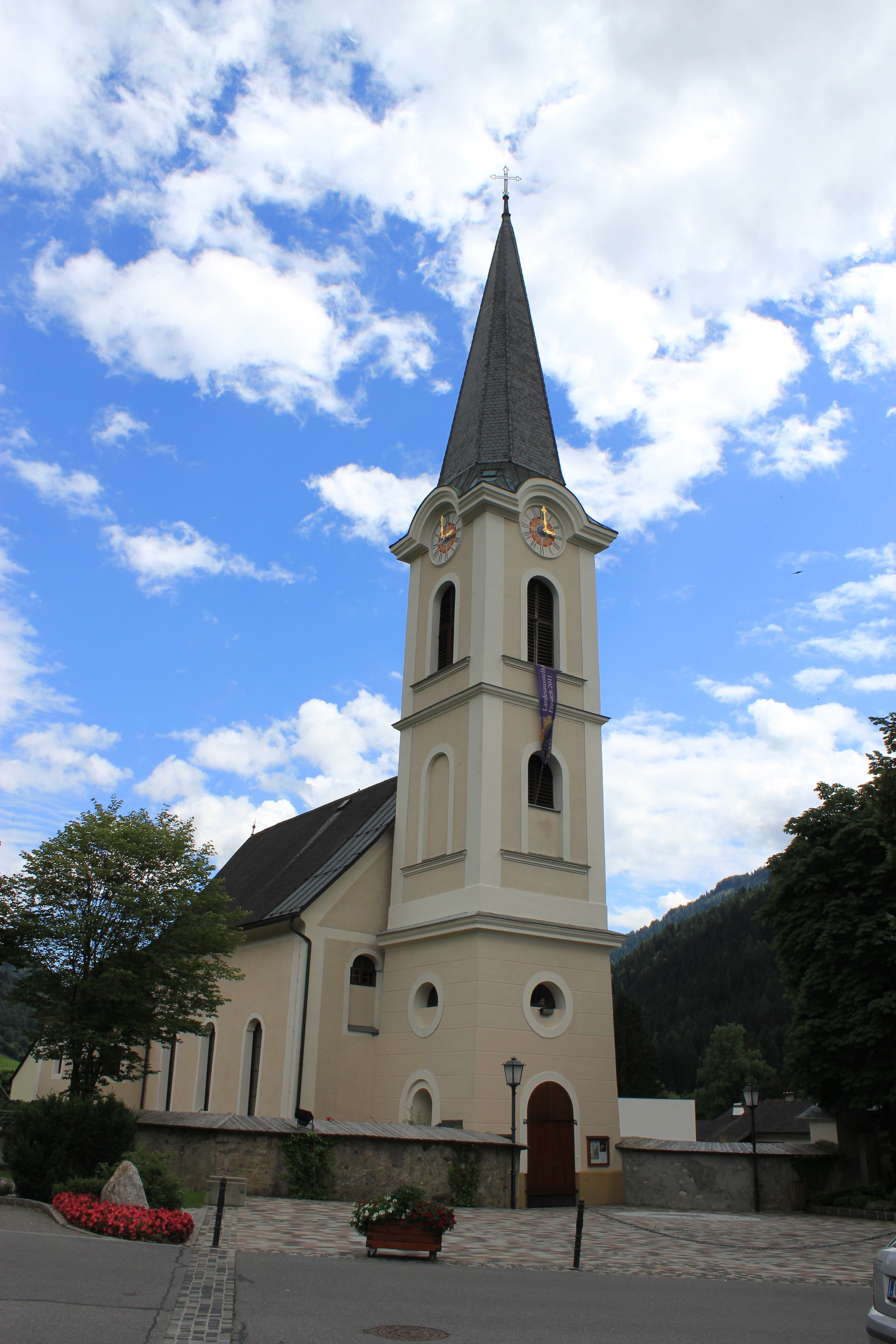
Protestant church

The hidden Gegend was not populated until the High Middle Ages, when about 1300 its sunny northern side was stubbed and the name of the valley was first mentioned in a 1308 deed. While large estates were held by the Carinthian Counts of Ortenburg, the village called Rauth (from German: Roden, root out) was the most important settlement in the whole area for a long time.

The settlement of Feld am See itself arose with the construction of a Protestant parish church in 1787. The remote Gegend valley had long been a centre of Crypto-protestantism, until the 1781 Patent of Toleration issued by Emperor Joseph II ended the Counter-Reformation persecutions.

The lake called Brennsee was named after a local tavern and distillery (Brenn) which was founded in 1632. The present-day municipality was established in 1850; an elementary school was founded one year later. In the late 19th century summer tourism around the lake started. Between 1973 and 1991 Feld am See and neighbouring Afritz am See were united to a single municipality.

== Politics ==
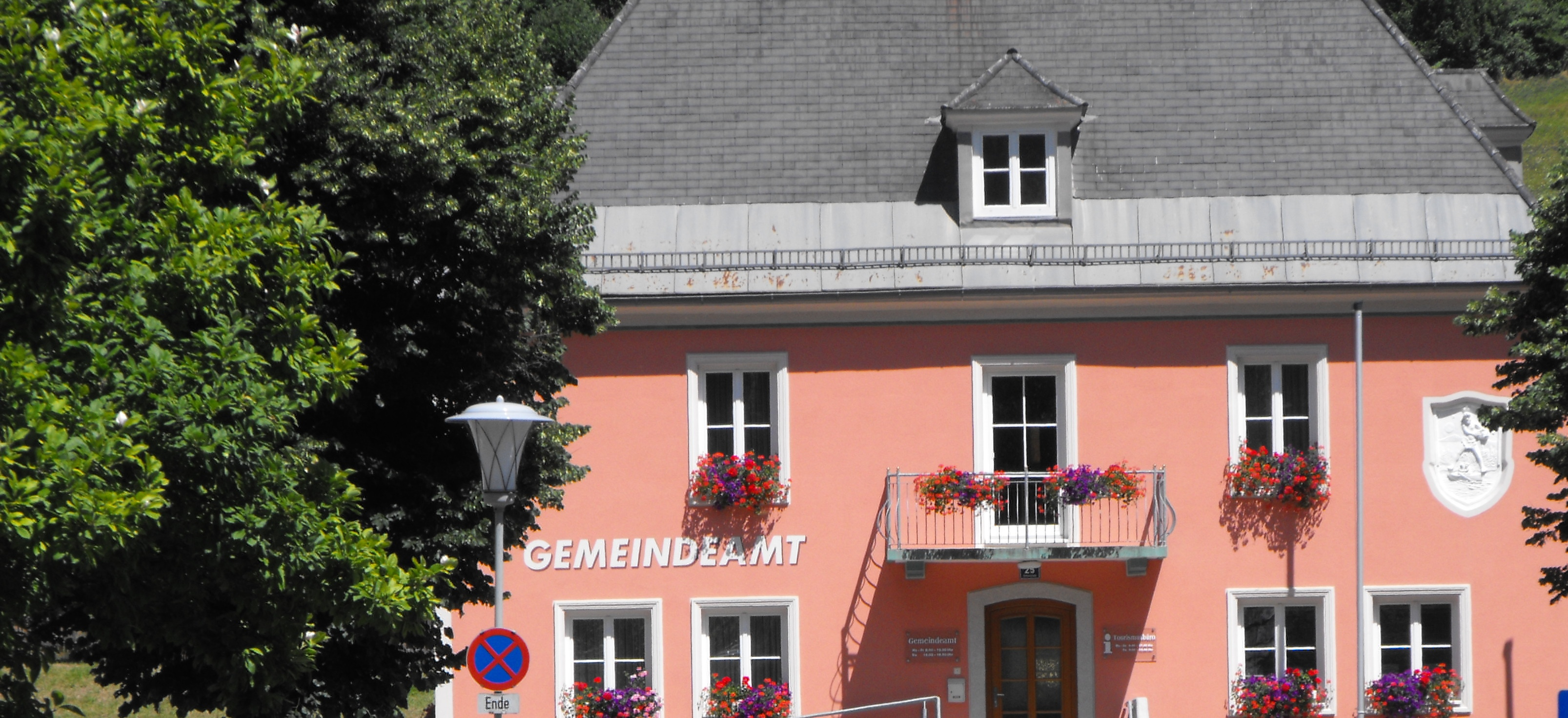
Town hall

Seats in the municipal council (Gemeinderat) as of 2021 local elections:

- Social Democratic Party of Austria (SPÖ): 7 (45.32%)
- Freedom Party of Austria (FPÖ): 3 (20.99%)
- Austrian People's Party (ÖVP): 5 (33.69%)

=== Twin towns — sister cities ===
Feld am See is twinned with:

- Wilhermsdorf, Germany, since 1988

== Cultural Activities and Associations ==
Several associations exist in Feld am See.

- MGV Feld am See - a male choral society
- Gemischter Chor Feld am See - a choir
- Frauentrachtengruppe Feld am See - a women's association wearing traditional costumes
- Trachtenkapelle Feld am See - a traditional Austrian big band
- Mirnock-Oldies - an Oldtimer association
- and some more

== Sights ==
Main sights are:

- Protestant church of Feld am See (built in 1787)
- Catholic church of Feld am See (build in 1960)
- Alpen Wildpark Feld am See - a deer park and museum
- Mirnockriese - a stone statue of a legendary giant

Places to visit:

- Brennsee - one of two bathing lakes
- Afritzer See - the second bathing lake
- Feldpannalm - scenic mountain pasture
