= Veronika Šarec =

Slovenian alpine skier (born 1969)

Personal information
- Born: 8 May 1969 (age 57) Ljubljana, SR Slovenia, SFR Yugoslavia

Skiing career
- Sport: Alpine skiing
- Retired: 1992
- Disciplines: sGiant slalom, slalom
- World Cup debut: 1986

Olympics
- Teams: 3
- Medals: 0 (0 gold)

World Championships
- Medals: 0 (0 gold)

World Cup
- Seasons: 7
- Wins: 1
- Podiums: 7
- Overall titles: 0
- Discipline titles: 0

Veronika Šarec (born 8 May 1969) is a Slovenian former alpine skier.

In her career, Šarec won one Alpine Skiing World Cup Slalom race, with seven podiums altogether. Her only win was the Haus im Ennstal Slalom in the 1989/90 season. Šarec represented Yugoslavia at the 1984 Winter Olympics and 1988 Winter Olympics and Slovenia at the 1992 Winter Olympics.

== World cup results ==
=== Season standings ===
| Season | Age | Overall | Slalom | Giant slalom | Super-G | Downhill | Combined |
|---|---|---|---|---|---|---|---|
| 1986 | 17 | 64 | 27 | — | — | — | — |
| 1987 | 18 | 77 | — | 36 | — | — | — |
| 1988 | 19 | 50 | 19 | — | — | — | — |
| 1989 | 20 | 17 | 4 | 32 | — | — | — |
| 1990 | 21 | 21 | 10 | 22 | — | — | — |
| 1991 | 22 | 25 | 7 | 32 | — | — | — |
| 1992 | 23 | 54 | 20 | 47 | — | — | — |

=== Race podiums ===
- 6 wins – (5 SL, 1 GS)
- 13 podiums – (9 SL, 3 GS, 1 SG)

| Season | Date | Location | Discipline | Position |
|---|---|---|---|---|
| 1988 | 19 December 1987 | Piancavallo, Italy | Slalom | 3rd |
| 1989 | 3 March 1989 | Furano, Japan | Slalom | 2nd |
| 1989 | 10 March 1989 | Shigakogen, Japan | Slalom | 3rd |
| 1990 | 10 December 1989 | Steamboat Springs, United States | Slalom | 2nd |
| 1990 | 14 January 1990 | Haus im Ennstal, Austria | Slalom | 1st |
| 1991 | 12 January 1991 | (Socialist Federal Republic of Yugoslavia) Kranjska Gora, Yugoslavia | Slalom | 3rd |
| 1991 | 13 January 1991 | (Socialist Federal Republic of Yugoslavia) Kranjska Gora, Yugoslavia | Slalom | 3rd |
