= Afritz am See =

- Municipality
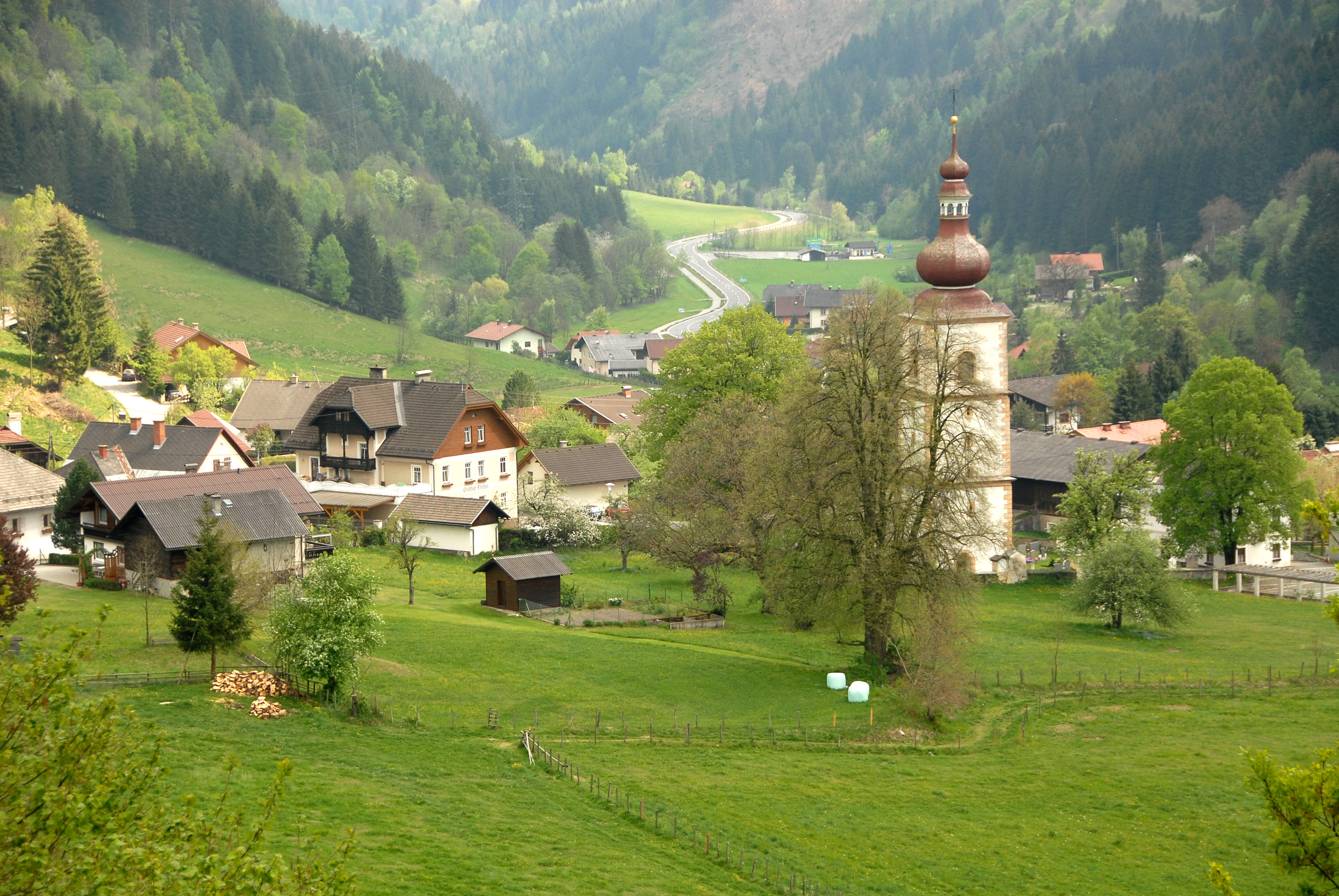

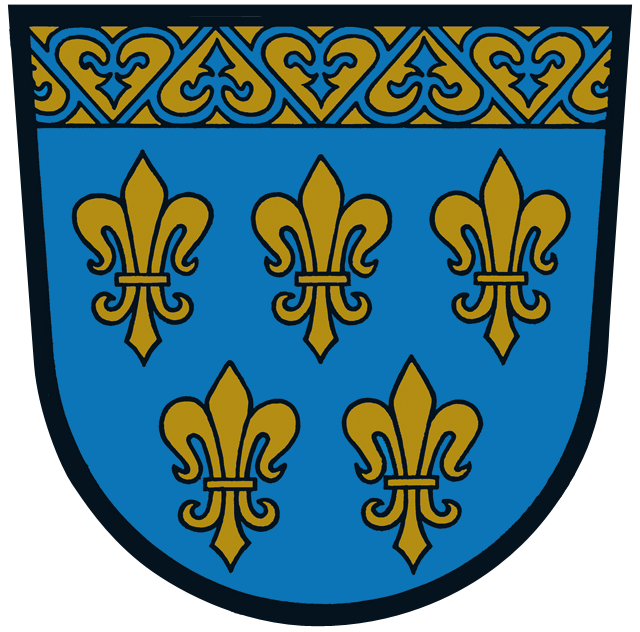
- Coat of arms

- Location within Austria
- Coordinates: 46°44′N 13°48′E
- Country: Austria
- State: Carinthia
- District: Villach-Land

Government
  - Mayor: Maximilian Linder (FPÖ)

Area
  - Total: 28.02 km^{2} (10.82 sq mi)
- Elevation: 711 m (2,333 ft)

Population (2018-01-01)
  - Total: 1,429
  - Density: 51.00/km^{2} (132.1/sq mi)
- Time zone: UTC+1 (CET)
  - Summer (DST): UTC+2 (CEST)
- Postal code: 9542
- Area code: 04247
- Website: afritz.gv.at

Afritz am See (Slovene: Zobrce) is a municipality in Villach-Land District in the Austrian state of Carinthia.

== Name ==
The name Afritz is ultimately derived from the Slovene prepositional phrase za brdce 'behind the small hill'. The Slovene phrase fused to yield *Zabrdce, which was borrowed into Middle High German as *Zafriz (from which, in turn, Cobrc was borrowed back into Slovene). The initial z- was misunderstood as the Middle High German preposition ze 'at', yielding the modern German decomposition Afritz.

== Geography ==
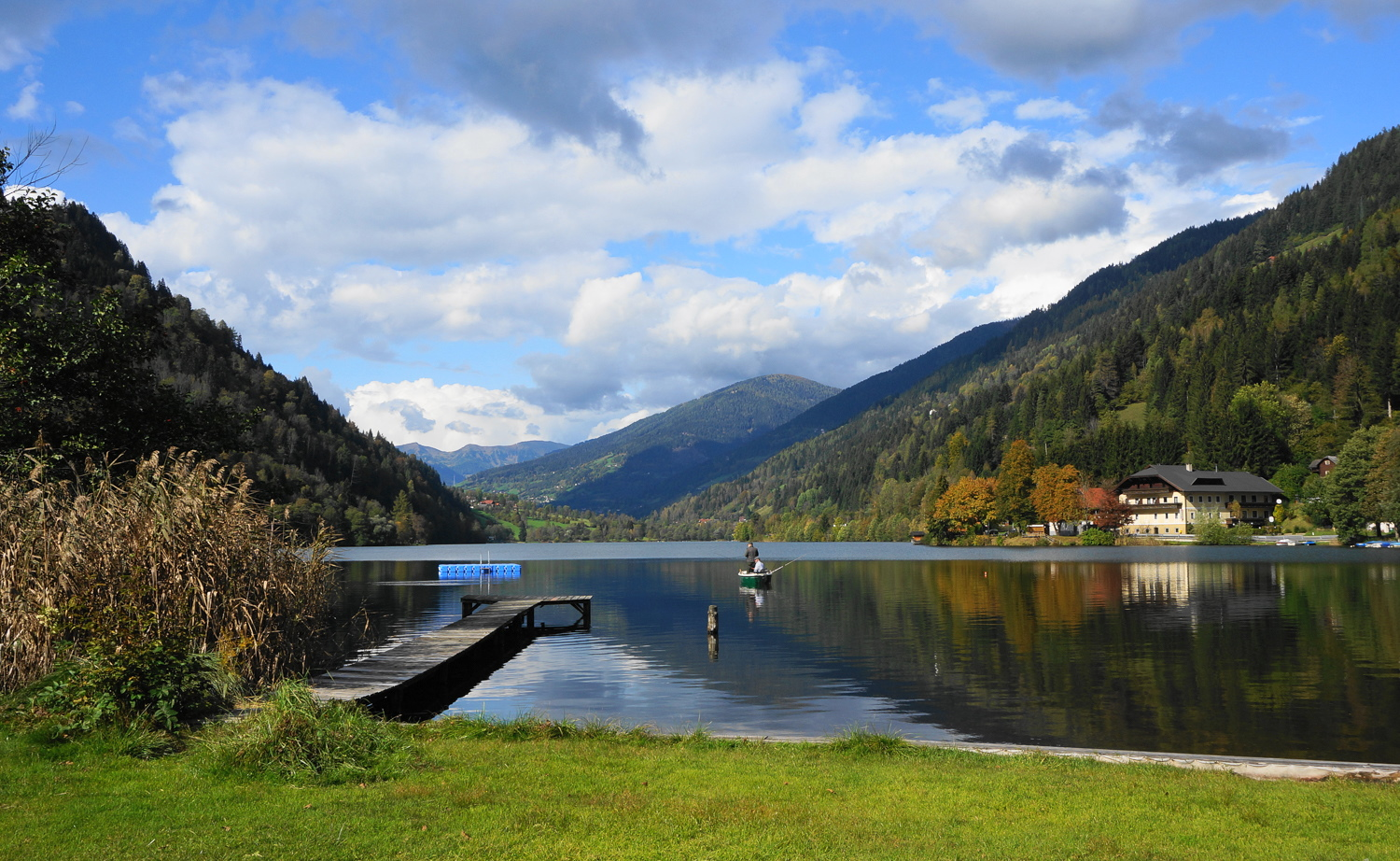
Lake Afritz

It is located within the Gegend Valley surrounded by the Nock Mountains, the western part of the Gurktal Alps mountain range, on the southern shore of small Afritzer See (Lake Afritz). The municipal area comprises the cadastral communities of Afritz and Berg ob Afritz.

== History ==
The remote valley was not settled until the High Middle Ages. Afritz itself was first mentioned in a 1408 deed, then an estate held by the Counts of Ortenburg.

In 1973, the municipality merged with neighbouring Feld am See, but since 1991 has again been a municipality in its own right. The appendix am See was added in 2000, mainly for tourist reasons, though officially Lake Afritz belongs to the municipal area of Feld am See.

== Politics ==
Seats in the municipal assembly (Gemeinderat) as of 2009 elections:

- Freedom Party in Carinthia (FPÖ): 9
- Social Democratic Party of Austria (SPÖ): 4
- Austrian People's Party (ÖVP): 2
