= Kellie Casey =

Canadian alpine skier (born 1965)

Kellie Casey (born November 29, 1965, in Toronto) is a Canadian former alpine skier who competed in the 1988 Winter Olympics.
