= Brennsee =

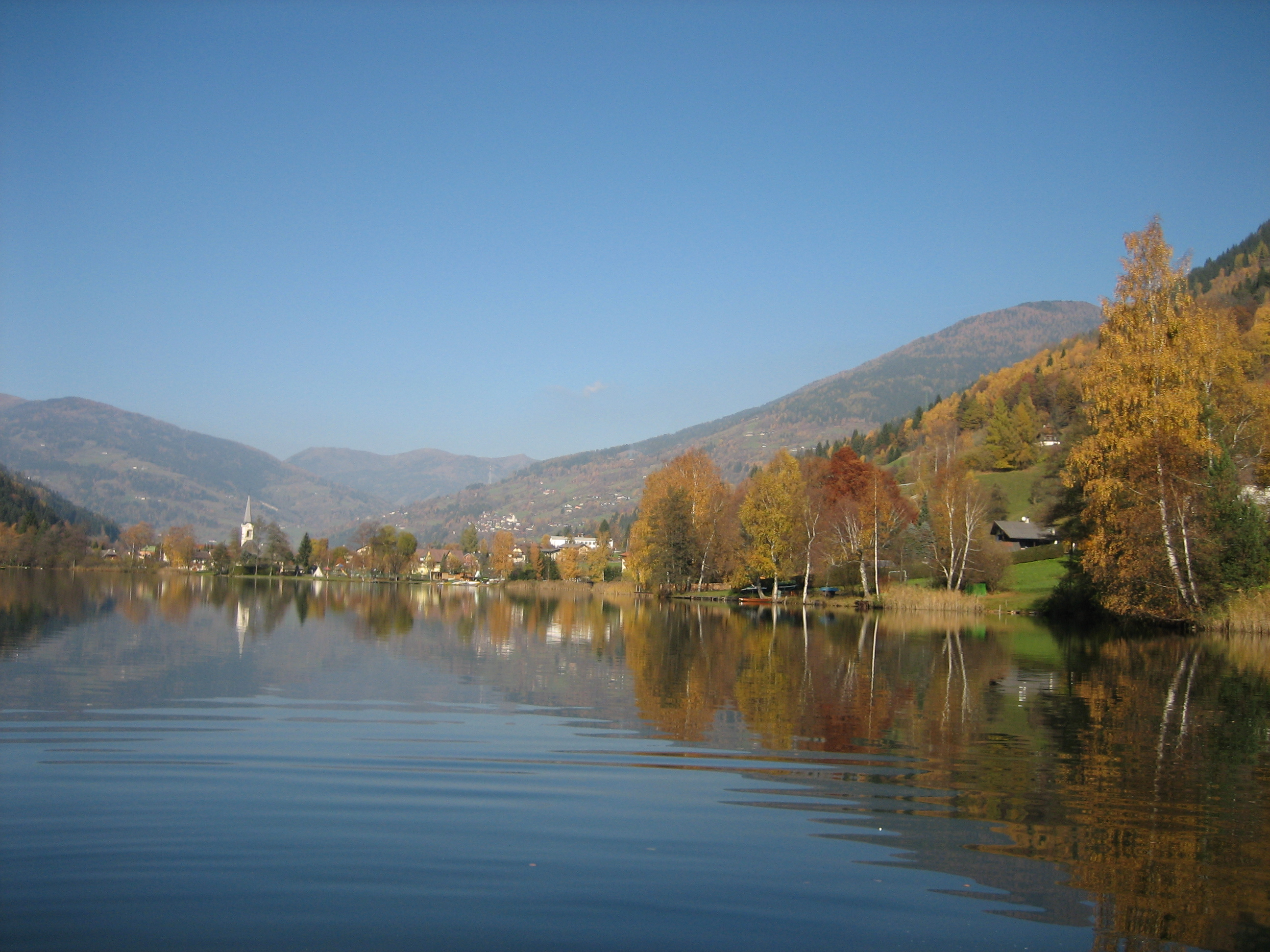
- View to Feld am See

- Location within Austria
- Location: Carinthia
- Coordinates: 46°46′8″N 13°45′5″E
- Lake type: glacial lake
- Primary outflows: Kleinkirchheimer Bach to Millstätter See
- Catchment area: 8.3 km^{2} (3.2 sq mi)
- Basin countries: Austria
- Max. length: 1.3 km (0.81 mi)
- Max. width: 0.5 km (0.31 mi)
- Surface area: 41 ha (0.16 sq mi)
- Average depth: 15.3 m (50 ft)
- Max. depth: 26.3 m (86 ft)
- Water volume: 6,274,453 m^{3} (5,086.782 acre⋅ft)
- Residence time: 2.5 years
- Surface elevation: 739 m (2,425 ft)
- Settlements: Feld am See

Brennsee, also called Feldsee, is a lake in Carinthia, Austria.

== Geography ==
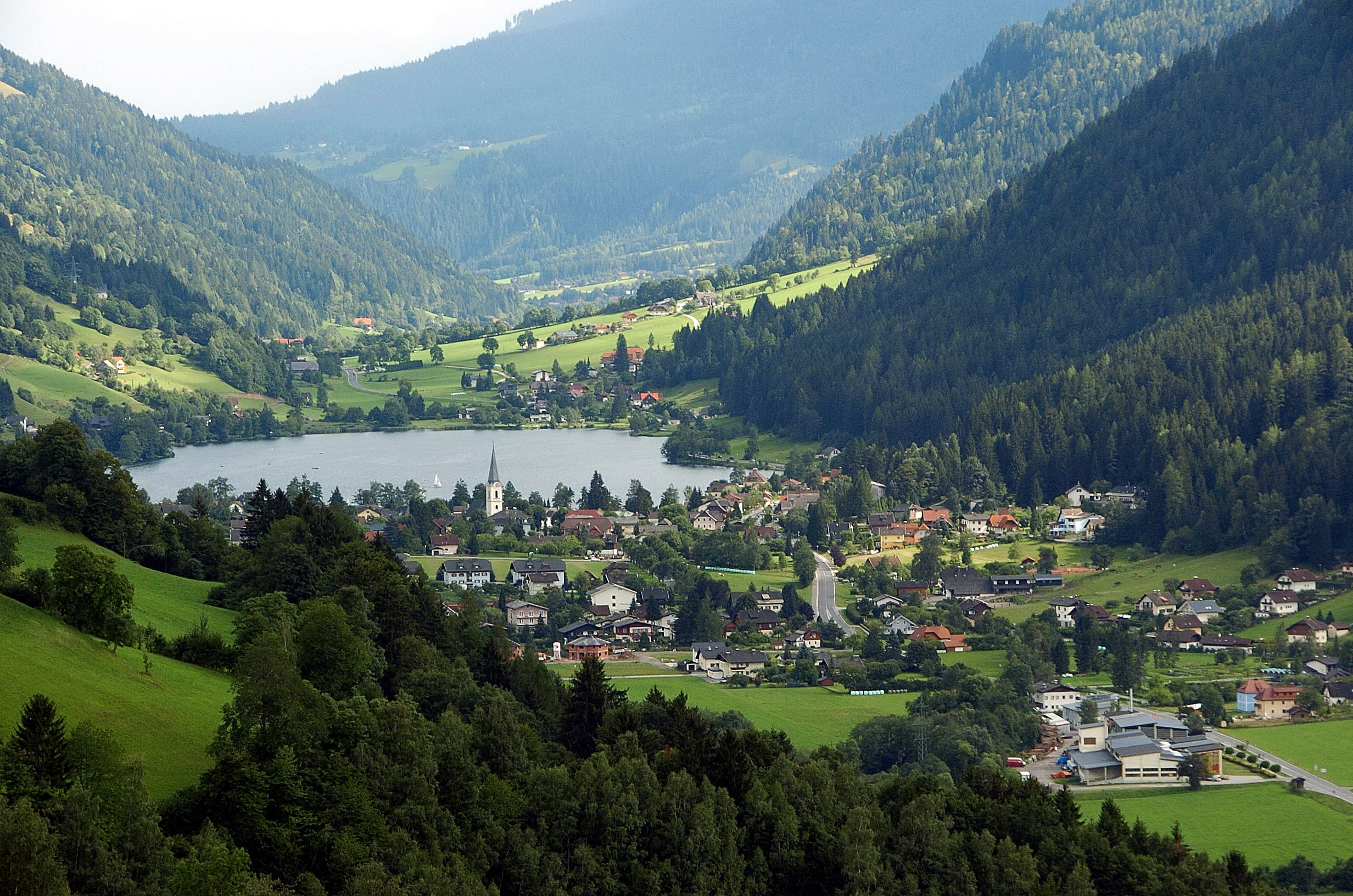
Brennsee within Gegendtal

It is situated at 739 metres above the Adriatic (2,425 ft), in the Gegendtal Valley, running from east to west through the Gurktal Alps (Nock Mountains) range. The shaded steep slopes of the Mirnock massif in the south are covered with forests, while the northern shore is settled with Alpine pastures and farmsteads. Brennsee is entirely located within the Feld am See municipal area.

== Limnology ==
The lake is mainly fed by ground water and by several small brooks in the north. At the western end of the lake a short stream dewaters the water into the Kleinkirchheimer Bach, which itself flows into Millstätter See (as Riegerbach) at Radenthein-Döbriach. The holomictic waters reach 23 °C (73 °F) in summer. The surrounding settlements are connected to a sewerage system since the 1970s, nevertheless agricultural discharge has proven to be problematic, leading to eutrophication with an overabundance of aquatic plants and algae. Recent efforts have decisively improved the water quality.

Fishery is common, mainly for northern pike and common carp, but also for wels catfish, perch, roach, rudd and bleak. Several attempts have been made to restore the extinct noble crayfish populations.
