= Niklas Lindqvist =

Swedish alpine skier (born 1964)

Carl Niklas Lindqvist
Personal information
- Nationality: Swedish
- Born: 16 May 1964 (age 62) Stockholm, Sweden

Sport
- Sport: Alpine skiing

Achievements and titles
- Olympic finals: 1988 Winter Olympics

Carl Niklas Lindqvist (born 16 May 1964 in Stockholm) is a Swedish former alpine skier who competed in the 1988 Winter Olympics.
