= Claudia Strobl =

Austrian alpine skier (born 1965)

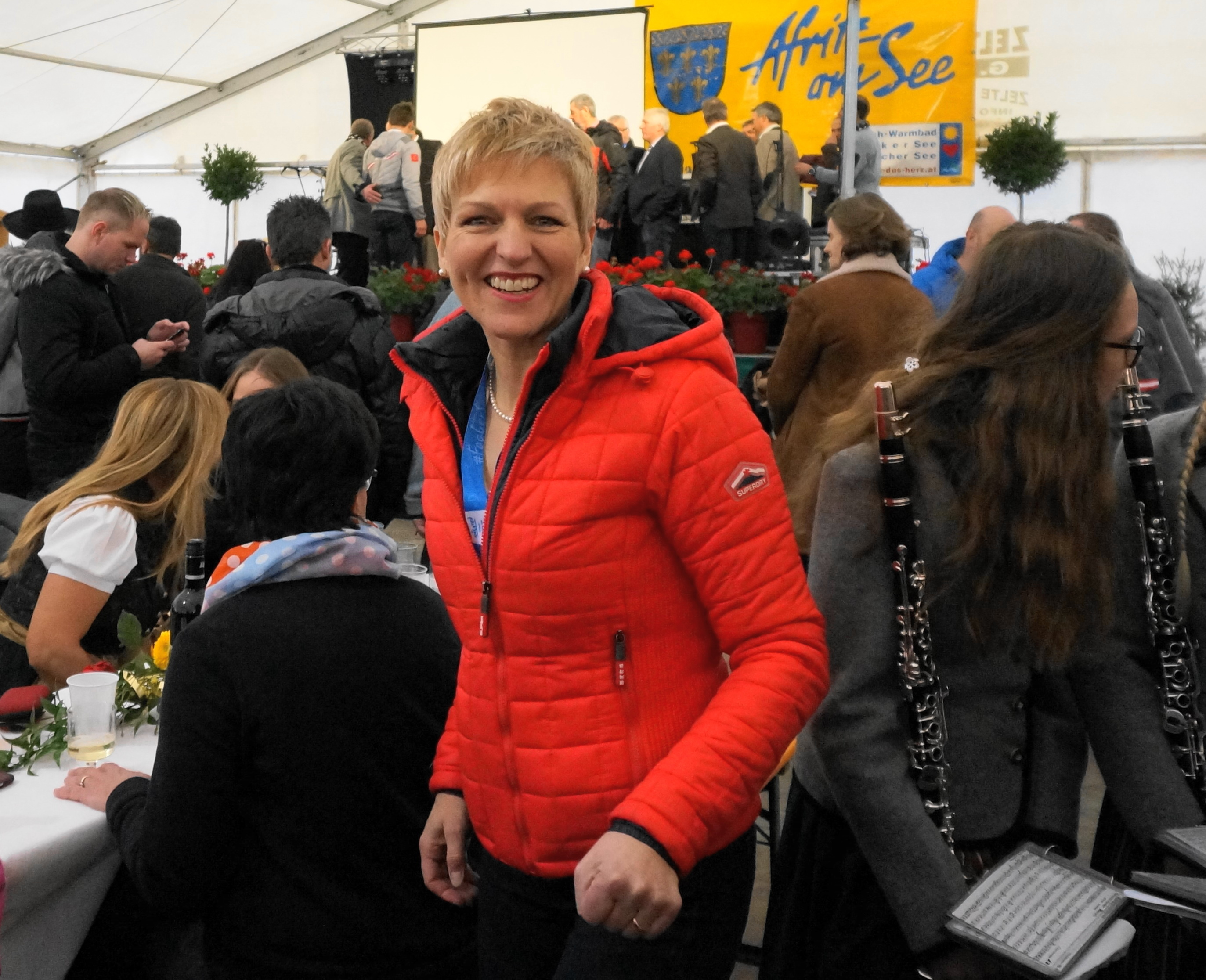
Claudia Strobl

Claudia Strobl (born 4 November 1965 in Afritz am See) is an Austrian former alpine skier who competed in the women's slalom at the 1992 Winter Olympics.
