= Manuela Ruef =

Austrian alpine skier (born 1966)

Personal information
- Born: 11 June 1966 (age 60) Bregenz, Austria

Skiing career
- Sport: Alpine skiing
- Disciplines: Technical events
- World Cup debut: 1987

World Cup
- Seasons: 2
- Podiums: 0

Manuela Ruef (born 11 June 1966) is a former Austrian alpine skier.

== World Cup results ==
Top 10

Date	Place	Discipline	Rank
26-11-1987	(Italy) Sestriere	Slalom	7

== Europa Cup results ==
Ruef has won an overall Europa Cup.

- FIS Alpine Ski Europa Cup
  - Overall: 1986
