= Cecilia Lucco =

Italian alpine skier (born 1968)

Personal information
- Born: 16 April 1968 (age 58) Turin, Italy

Skiing career
- Sport: Alpine skiing
- Retired: 1990
- Disciplines: Technical events
- World Cup debut: 1985

World Championships
- Teams: 1
- Medals: 0

World Cup
- Seasons: 4
- Podiums: 0

Cecilia Lucco (born 16 April 1968) is a former Italian World Cup alpine ski racer

== World Championships results ==
Year
Year	Age	Slalom	Giant; Slalom	Super-G	Downhill	Combined
1989	20	11	-	-	-	-

== National titles ==
Lucco won two national titles.

- Italian Alpine Ski Championships
  - Giant slalom: 1986, 1988
