= 1987 Alpine Skiing World Cup – Men's giant slalom =

1987 Men's giant slalom World Cup
Previous: 1986	Next: 1988

Men's giant slalom World Cup 1986/1987

== Final point standings ==
In men's giant slalom World Cup 1986/87, the best five results counted. Seven racers had point deductions, which are given in brackets.

Place	Name	Country	Total points	Deduction	4 (Italy)	8 (Italy)	9 (Italy)	11 (Socialist Federal Republic of Yugoslavia)	17 (Switzerland)	21 (Switzerland)	26 (Germany)	34 (Socialist Federal Republic of Yugoslavia)
1	Pirmin Zurbriggen	Switzerland	102	(17)	15	-	12	(7)	25	25	25	(10)
(2)	Joël Gaspoz	Switzerland	102	(9)	12	-	25	25	-	20	(9)	20
3	Richard Pramotton	Italy	95	(3)	25	25	20	15	-	(3)	10	-
4	Hubert Strolz	Austria	66	(5)	20	-	11	9	15	11	(5)	-
5	Marc Girardelli	Luxembourg	65		-	-	-	-	20	-	20	25
6	Markus Wasmeier	West Germany	59	(1)	-	(1)	15	11	8	10	15	-
7	Ingemar Stenmark	Sweden	58	(17)	-	12	9	10	12	15	(8)	(9)
8	Robert Erlacher	Italy	57	(10)	8	10	(4)	20	(6)	7	12	-
9	Alberto Tomba	Italy	52		-	20	3	6	-	-	11	12
10	Helmut Mayer	Austria	39		-	-	2	12	7	-	7	11
11	Rudolf Nierlich	Austria	34		-	-	7	-	-	12	-	15
12	Hans Pieren	Switzerland	32		6	11	-	1	-	-	6	8
13	Oswald Tötsch	Italy	31		7	15	6	3	-	-	-	-
	Michael Eder	West Germany	31		-	7	8	8	-	4	4	-
15	Frank Wörndl	West Germany	29		-	9	-	-	11	9	-	-
16	Martin Hangl	Switzerland	24		9	-	-	4	10	1	-	-
17	Hans Stuffer	West Germany	22		5	5	-	-	9	-	3	-
18	Ivano Camozzi	Italy	16		10	-	-	-	6	-	-	-
19	Andreas Wenzel	Liechtenstein	15		-	-	10	-	-	5	-	-
20	Tomaž Čižman	Yugoslavia	12		-	-	-	-	-	9	1	2
	Bernhard Gstrein	Austria	12		-	7	-	5	-	-	-	-
	Günther Mader	Austria	12		-	-	5	-	-	-	-	7
	Guido Hinterseer	Austria	12		-	-	-	-	4	-	2	6
24	Martin Knöri	Switzerland	11		11	-	-	-	-	-	-	-
25	Hans Enn	Austria	8		-	8	-	-	-	-	-	-
26	Christian Gaidet	France	7		-	-	-	2	3	2	-	-
27	Jörgen Sundqvist	Sweden	7		-	-	-	-	-	6	-	-
	Rok Petrović	Yugoslavia	6		3	-	-	-	-	-	-	3
29	Yves Tavernier	France	5		-	4	1	-	-	-	-	-
	Leonhard Stock	Austria	5		-	-	-	-	-	-	-	5
31	Franck Piccard	France	4		4	-	-	-	-	-	-	-
	Karl Thaler	Austria	4		-	-	-	-	-	-	-	4
33	Marco Tonazzi	Italy	3		-	3	-	-	-	-	-	-
34	Klemen Bergant	Yugoslavia	2		2	-	-	-	-	-	-	-
	Josef Schick	West Germany	2		-	2	-	-	-	-	-	-
	Thomas Bürgler	Switzerland	2		-	-	-	-	2	-	-	-
	Felix McGrath	United States	2		1	-	-	-	1	-	-	-
38	Walter Gugele	Austria	1		-	-	-	-	-	-	-	1

Alpine Skiing World Cup
Men

Overall | Downhill | Super G | Giant slalom | Slalom | Combined

1987
