= Heinz Holzer =

Italian alpine skier (born 1964)

Personal information
- Born: 28 August 1964 (age 62) Bruneck, Italy

Skiing career
- Sport: Alpine skiing
- Retired: 1989
- Disciplines: Polyvalent
- World Cup debut: 1982

Olympics
- Teams: 1
- Medals: 0

World Cup
- Seasons: 5
- Podiums: 1

Heinz Holzer (born 28 August 1964) is an Italian former alpine skier who competed in the 1988 Winter Olympics. He has ranked #27 in the Giant Slalom event, and #11 in the Super G event at Calgary 1988.
