= Monika Äijä =

Swedish alpine skier (born 1963)

Kerstin Monica Äijä-Lenndin (born 17 February 1963) is a retired Swedish alpine skier who competed in the 1988 Winter Olympics.

She was born in Abisko.
