= Alberto Ghidoni =

Italian alpine skier (born 1962)

Personal information
- Born: 15 April 1962 (age 64) Collio, Italy

Skiing career
- Sport: Alpine skiing
- Retired: 1987
- Disciplines: Speed events
- World Cup debut: 1983

Olympics
- Teams: 1

World Cup
- Seasons: 5
- Podiums: 1

Alberto Ghidoni (born 15 April 1962) is an Italian alpine ski coach and former alpine skier.

== Career ==
He competed in the 1984 Winter Olympics.
