= Anette Gersch =

German alpine skier (born 1966)

Anette Gersch (born 26 February 1966, in Sonthofen) is a German former alpine skier who competed in the women's slalom at the 1988 Winter Olympics.
