= Catharina Glassér-Bjerner =

Swedish alpine skier (born 1964)

Catharina Glassér-Bjerner (born 16 February 1964 in Grycksbo) is a Swedish former alpine skier who competed in the 1988 Winter Olympics.
