= Corinne Schmidhauser =

Swiss alpine skier

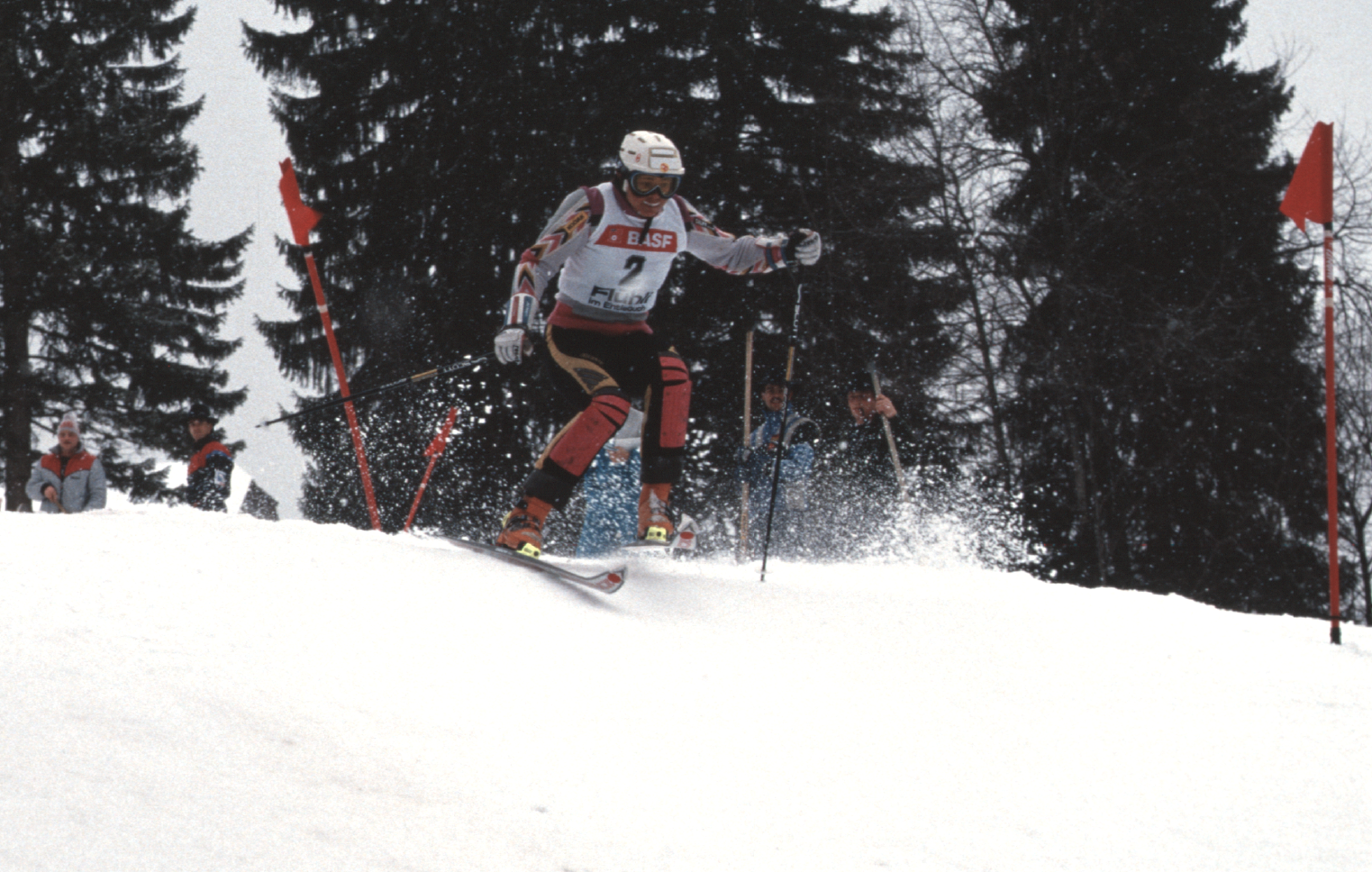
- Corinne Schmidhauser racing in 1987

Personal information
- Born: 30 May 1964 (age 62) Zollikofen, Switzerland

Skiing career
- Sport: Alpine skiing
- Retired: 1989
- Disciplines: Technical events
- World Cup debut: 1983

World Championships
- Teams: 1

World Cup
- Seasons: 7
- Wins: 4
- Podiums: 8
- Discipline titles: 1
Medal record
Women's alpine skiing
Representing Switzerland
World Cup race podiums
Event	1st	2nd	3rd
Slalom	4	1	2
Combined	0	1	0
Total	4	2	2

Corinne Schmidhauser (born 30 May 1964) is a Swiss former alpine skier. In 1987, she won the World Cup in slalom. She also competed in the alpine skiing at the 1988 Winter Olympics.

== Career ==
During her career she has achieved 8 results among the top 3 in the World Cup.

== World Cup results ==
Top 3

Date	Place	Discipline	Rank
24-01-1988	(Austria) Bad Gastein	Slalom	3
28-02-1987	(Germany) Zwiesel	Slalom	1
15-02-1987	(Switzerland) Fluehli	Slalom	1
14-02-1987	(France) St. Gervais	Slalom	2
04-01-1987	(Slovenia) Maribor	Slalom	3
30-11-1986	(United States) Park City	Slalom	1
09-02-1986	(Czechoslovakia) Vysoke Tatry	Slalom	1
25-01-1986	(France) St. Gervais	Combined	2
