= Catherine Quittet =

Austrian alpine skier

Personal information
- Born: 22 January 1964 (age 62) Megève, France

Skiing career
- Sport: Alpine skiing
- Disciplines: Speed events, giant slalom

World Cup
- Wins: 2
- Podiums: 7
Medal record
Women's alpine skiing
Representing France
World Cup race podiums
Event	1st	2nd	3rd
Giant slalom	1	1	0
Downhill	0	1	1
Super-G	1	2	0
Total	2	4	1
International competitions
Event	1st	2nd	3rd
World Junior Championships	1	0	0
European Junior Championships	1	0	0
Total	2	0	0

Catherine Quittet (born 22 January 1964 in Megève) is a French former alpine skier.

== Career ==
During her career she has achieved 7 results among the top 3 in the World Cup. She competed in the 1988 Winter Olympics.

After years of competition, she studied at Emlyon Business School and manages her family's sports store dedicated to skiing.

== World Cup results ==
Podiums

Date	Place	Discipline	Rank
09-01-1988	(Austria) Lech	Super G	2
05-01-1988	(France) Tignes	Giant slalom	2
20-12-1987	(Italy) Piancavallo	Giant slalom	1
17-01-1987	(Germany) Pfronten	Super G	1
14-12-1986	(France) Val d'Isere	Super G	2
13-12-1986	(France) Val d'Isere	Downhill	3
20-01-1985	(France) St. Gervais	Downhill	2
