= Piste Oreiller-Killy =

Ski course in France

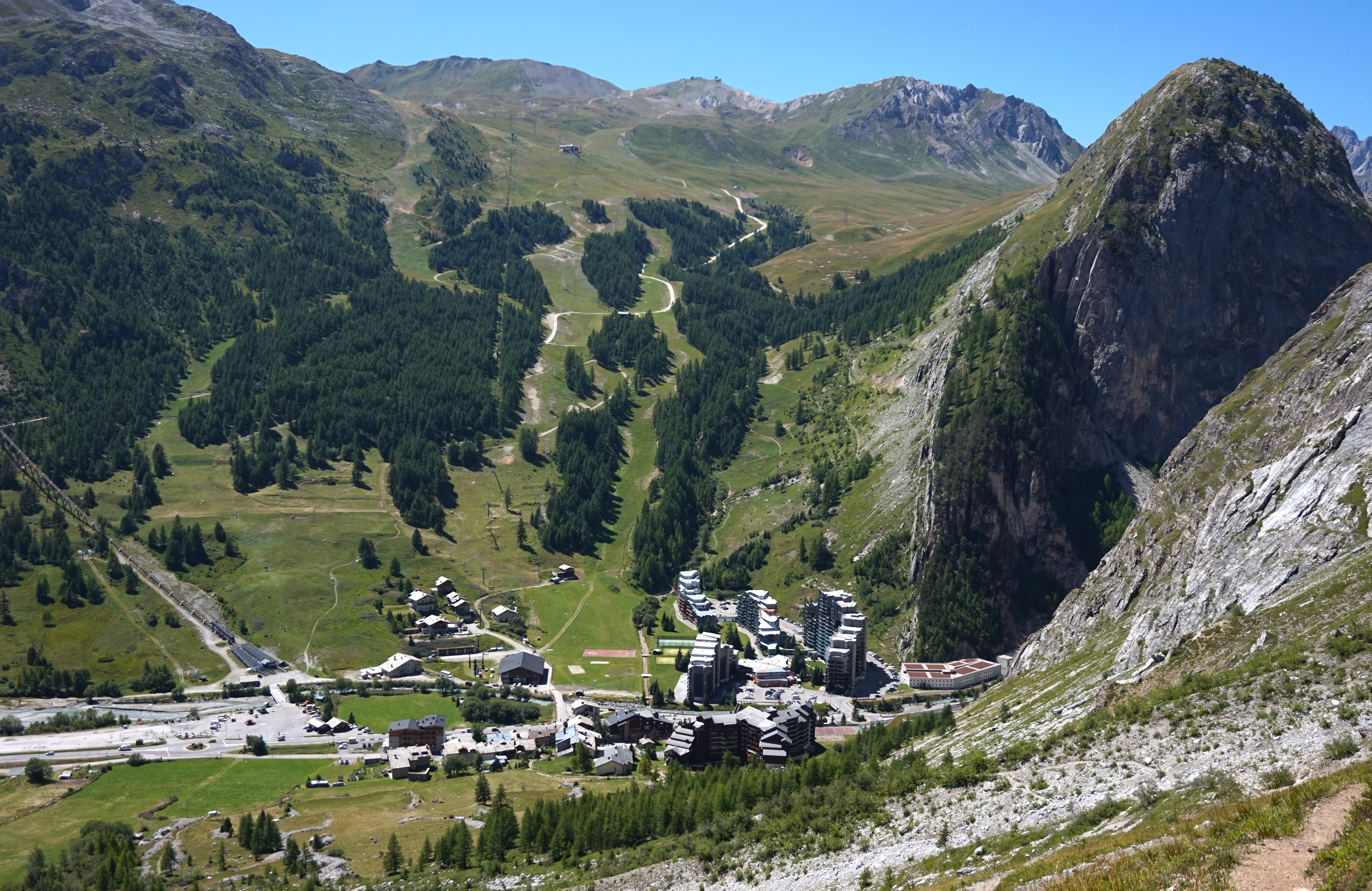
- Interactive map of Piste Oreiller-Killy
- Location within France Location within Alps Location within Europe
- 45°26′32″N 6°57′07″E
- Location: Val d'Isere, Savoie, France
- Mountain: Rocher de Bellevarde
- Opened: 1966; 60 years ago
- Member: Club5+
- Level: advanced
- Competition: Critérium of the First Snow

Women's downhill
- Start: 2,580 m (8,465 ft) (AA)
- Finish: 1,810 m (5,938 ft)
- Vertical drop: 770 m (2,526 ft)
- Length: 3.037 km (1.89 mi)
- Max incline: 27.5 degrees (52%)

Piste Oreiller-Killy is a World Cup downhill ski course in France, at La Daille on Rocher de Bellevarde in Val d'Isere, Savoie. It debuted 60 years ago in 1966 and is named after ski legends Henri Oreiller and Jean-Claude Killy.

The course is about two kilometres (1.2 miles) down the road from "La face de Bellevarde", an extremely steep course designed by Bernhard Russi for the 1992 Winter Olympics.

Silvano Beltrametti's accident on the course in December 2001 led to safety improvements; blue lines were introduced in ski competitions, which led the way to the next poles.

== Course ==
Since opening in 1966, it is part of the "Critérium of the First Snow" (Critérium de la première neige), one of the oldest and most prestigious ski races in the world.

It was later named for alpine ski legends Henri Oreiller and Jean-Claude Killy, Olympic champions with strong ties to Val d'Isere.

Part of World Cup since its second season in 1968, it is one of the classic and most common hosts on the circuit for both genders.

It replaced cancelled events from Wengen (1990), Val Gardena (2000), Alta Badia (2000), and Beaver Creek (2001, 2008, 2016, 2020).

The course regularly hosts women's World Cup events; men's races moved to Bellevarde permanently in 2008, except when replacing previously cancelled events.

=== Sections ===
- Bosse à Colombin
- Plat de la OK
- Le Téléphone pleure
- Le Carroussel
- L'Entrée de la Forêt
- La Bosse à Emile
- La Compression
- La Traversée
- L'Usine à Neige

== World Cup ==
=== Men ===
No.	Type	Season	Date	Winner	Second	Third
38	GS	1968/69	12 December 1968	(Austria) Karl Schranz	(France) Bernard Orcel	(France) Henri Duvillard
60	GS	1969/70	11 December 1969	(Italy) Gustav Thöni	(France) Patrick Russel	(France) Jean-Noël Augert
61	DH	1969/70	14 December 1969	(Australia) Malcolm Milne	(Switzerland) Jean-Daniel Dätwyler	(Austria) Karl Schranz
88	GS	1970/71	17 December 1970	(France) Patrick Russel	(France) Jean-Noël Augert	(Italy) Gustav Thöni
89	DH	1970/71	20 December 1970	(Austria) Karl Cordin	(France) Bernard Orcel	(Austria) Karl Schranz
113	GS	1971/72	9 December 1971	(Norway) Erik Håker	(France) Jean-Noël Augert	(France) Henri Duvillard
114	DH	1971/72	12 December 1971	(Austria) Karl Schranz	(Austria) Heinrich Messner	(Switzerland) Michel Dätwyler
133	GS	1972/73	8 December 1972	(Italy) Piero Gros	(Norway) Erik Håker	(Italy) Helmuth Schmalzl
134	DH	1972/73	10 December 1972	(Austria) Reinhard Tritscher	(Austria) David Zwilling	(Italy) Marcello Varallo
157	GS	1973/74	8 December 1973	(Austria) Hans Hinterseer	(Italy) Helmuth Schmalzl	(Italy) Piero Gros
158	DH	1973/74	10 December 1973	(Italy) Herbert Plank	(Austria) Werner Grissmann	(Austria) Franz Klammer
178	GS	1974/75	5 December 1974	(Italy) Piero Gros	(Sweden) Ingemar Stenmark	(Norway) Erik Håker
179	DH	1974/75	8 December 1974	(Austria) Franz Klammer	(Austria) Werner Grissmann	(West Germany) Michael Veith
205	GS	1975/76	5 December 1975	(Italy) Gustav Thöni	(Sweden) Ingemar Stenmark	(Italy) Piero Gros
206	DH	1975/76	7 December 1975	(Canada) Ken Read	(Italy) Herbert Plank	(Switzerland) Bernhard Russi
230	GS	1976/77	10 December 1976	(United States) Phil Mahre	(Sweden) Ingemar Stenmark	(Austria) Klaus Heidegger
231	GS	1976/77	12 December 1976	(Switzerland) Heini Hemmi	(Italy) Piero Gros	(United States) Phil Mahre
263	GS	1977/78	10 December 1977	(Sweden) Ingemar Stenmark	(Switzerland) Heini Hemmi	(Switzerland) Jean-Luc Fournier
264	DH	1977/78	11 December 1977	(Austria) Franz Klammer	(Italy) Herbert Plank	(Austria) Josef Walcher
318	DH	1979/80	7 December 1979	(Austria) Peter Wirnsberger	(Italy) Herbert Plank	(Norway) Erik Håker
319	GS	1979/80	8 December 1979	(Sweden) Ingemar Stenmark	(Socialist Federal Republic of Yugoslavia) Bojan Križaj	(Austria) Hans Enn
320	KB	1979/80	8 December 1979	(United States) Phil Mahre	(United States) Steve Mahre	(France) Michel Vion
345	DH	1980/81	7 December 1980	(Austria) Uli Spieß	(Canada) Ken Read	(Canada) Steve Podborski
353	KB	1980/81	7 December 1980; Val d'Isere (DH) ---------------------------- 4 January 1981; Ebnat-Kappel (GS)	(Liechtenstein) Andreas Wenzel	(Austria) Hans Enn	(United States) Phil Mahre
381	DH	1981/82	6 December 1981	(Austria) Franz Klammer	(Switzerland) Peter Müller	(Switzerland) Toni Bürgler
383	KB	1981/82	6 December 1981; Val d'Isere (DH) ---------------------------- 8 December 1981; Aprica (GS)	(United States) Phil Mahre	(Liechtenstein) Andreas Wenzel	(Austria) Leonhard Stock
415	SG	1982/83	12 December 1982	(Switzerland) Peter Müller	(Switzerland) Peter Lüscher	(Switzerland) Pirmin Zurbriggen
418	KB	1982/83	12 December 1982; Val d'Isere (SG) ---------------------------- 19 December 1982; Val Gardena (DH1)	(Switzerland) Franz Heinzer	(Switzerland) Peter Müller	(Switzerland) Peter Lüscher
424	DH	1982/83	9 January 1983	(Austria) Erwin Resch	(Switzerland) Peter Lüscher	(Switzerland) Conradin Cathomen
425	DH	1982/83	10 January 1983	(Switzerland) Conradin Cathomen	(Canada) Ken Read	(Italy) Danilo Sbardellotto
453	DH	1983/84	9 December 1983	(Switzerland) Franz Heinzer	(Canada) Todd Brooker	(Austria) Harti Weirather
454	SG	1983/84	10 December 1983	(Austria) Hans Enn	(Switzerland) Pirmin Zurbriggen	(Socialist Federal Republic of Yugoslavia) Jure Franko
455	KB	1983/84	10 December 1983	(Switzerland) Franz Heinzer	(Switzerland) Pirmin Zurbriggen	(Austria) Leonhard Stock
527	DH	1985/86	7 December 1985	(Italy) Michael Mair	(Luxembourg) Marc Girardelli	(Austria) Peter Wirnsberger
546	KB	1985/86	7 December 1985; Val d'Isere (DH) ---------------------------- 3 February 1986; Crans-Montana (SG1)	(Switzerland) Peter Müller	(Italy) Michael Mair	(Switzerland) Karl Alpiger
573	DH	1986/87	5 December 1986	(Switzerland) Pirmin Zurbriggen	(West Germany) Markus Wasmeier	(Italy) Michael Mair
574	SG	1986/87	6 December 1986	(West Germany) Markus Wasmeier	(Italy) Robert Erlacher	(Luxembourg) Marc Girardelli
	DH	1987/88	6 December 1987	cancelled due to fog, wind and snow; replaced on 7 December 1987		
605	DH	1987/88	7 December 1987	(Switzerland) Daniel Mahrer	(Switzerland) Pirmin Zurbriggen	(Italy) Michael Mair
611	DH	1987/88	9 January 1988	(Switzerland) Pirmin Zurbriggen	(Austria) Anton Steiner	(Luxembourg) Marc Girardelli
612	SG	1987/88	10 January 1988	(West Germany) Markus Wasmeier	(France) Franck Piccard	(Switzerland) Pirmin Zurbriggen
	DH	1989/90	9 December 1989	high temperatures and lack of snow; rescheduled on 26 January 1990		
671	SG	1989/90	10 December 1989	(Sweden) Niklas Henning	(France) Franck Piccard	(Italy) Peter Runggaldier
	DH	1989/90	26 January 1990	cancelled again due to heavy snowfall; finally replaced on the next day		
684	DH	1989/90	27 January 1990	(Austria) Helmut Höflehner	(Norway) Atle Skårdal	(Switzerland) William Besse
	DH	1989/90	27 January 1990	planned to replace cancelled DH from Wengen; rescheduled on 29 January 1990		
	DH	1989/90	28 January 1990	planned to replace cancelled SG from Wengen; rescheduled on 29 January 1990		
685	DH	1989/90	29 January 1990	(Austria) Helmut Höflehner	(Switzerland) William Besse	(Switzerland) Franz Heinzer
686	SG	1989/90	29 January 1990	(Switzerland) Steve Locher	(France) Armand Schiele	(Austria) Günther Mader
701	DH	1990/91	8 December 1990	(Austria) Leonhard Stock	(Switzerland) Franz Heinzer	(Austria) Peter Wirnsberger
	SG	1990/91	9 December 1990	cancelled due to heavy snowfall		
731	DH	1991/92	7 December 1991	(United States) AJ Kitt	(Austria) Leonhard Stock	(Switzerland) Franz Heinzer
732	SG	1991/92	8 December 1991	(Luxembourg) Marc Girardelli	(Norway) Atle Skårdal	(Switzerland) Urs Kälin
798	SG	1993/94	12 December 1993	(Austria) Günther Mader	(Norway) Kjetil André Aamodt	(United States) Tommy Moe
799	GS	1993/94	13 December 1993	(Austria) Christian Mayer	(Germany) Tobias Barnerssoi	(Switzerland) Michael von Grünigen
833	DH	1994/95	16 December 1994	(Austria) Josef Strobl	(France) Luc Alphand	(Austria) Günther Mader
834	DH	1994/95	17 December 1994	(Austria) Armin Assinger	(Austria) Patrick Ortlieb	(Austria) Josef Strobl
835	GS	1994/95	18 December 1994	(Switzerland) Michael von Grünigen	(Norway) Kjetil André Aamodt	(Austria) Günther Mader
868	DH	1995/96	9 December 1995	(France) Luc Alphand	(Austria) Roland Assinger	(Austria) Hannes Trinkl
869	SG	1995/96	10 December 1995	(Norway) Atle Skårdal	(Norway) Lasse Kjus	(Austria) Hans Knauß
900	DH	1996/97	15 December 1996	(Austria) Fritz Strobl	(Austria) Werner Franz	(Austria) Patrick Ortlieb
901	SG	1996/97	16 December 1996	(Austria) Hans Knauß	(Austria) Günther Mader	(Switzerland) Steve Locher
	DH	1997/98	13 December 1997	cancelled due to heavy snowfall		
940	GS	1997/98	14 December 1997	(Switzerland) Michael von Grünigen	(Austria) Stephan Eberharter	(Austria) Hans Knauß
975	DH	1998/99	12 December 1998	(Norway) Lasse Kjus	(Italy) Luca Cattaneo	(Italy) Erik Seletto
976	SG	1998/99	13 December 1998	(Austria) Hermann Maier	(Austria) Stephan Eberharter	(Norway) Lasse Kjus
1052	DH	2000/01	9 December 2000	(Austria) Hermann Maier	(Austria) Stephan Eberharter	(Austria) Fritz Strobl
1053	GS	2000/01	10 December 2000	(Austria) Hermann Maier	(Austria) Heinz Schilchegger	(Austria) Andreas Schifferer
1055	DH	2000/01	16 December 2000	(Italy) Alessandro Fattori	(Italy) Kristian Ghedina	(Italy) Roland Fischnaller
1056	GS	2000/01	17 December 2000	(Switzerland) Michael von Grünigen	(Austria) Heinz Schilchegger	(United States) Bode Miller
1081	SG	2001/02	7 December 2001	(Austria) Stephan Eberharter	(Switzerland) Didier Cuche	(Switzerland) Silvano Beltrametti
1082	DH	2001/02	8 December 2001	(Austria) Stephan Eberharter	(Italy) Kurt Sulzenbacher	(Austria) Michael Walchhofer
1083	GS	2001/02	9 December 2001	(United States) Bode Miller	(France) Frédéric Covili	(Austria) Stephan Eberharter
1120	DH	2002/03	14 December 2002	(Austria) Stephan Eberharter	(Austria) Klaus Kröll	(Austria) Andreas Schifferer
1121	GS	2002/03	15 December 2002	(Switzerland) Michael von Grünigen	(United States) Bode Miller	(Austria) Christoph Gruber
	DH	2003/04	13 December 2003	cancelled; replaced in Beaver Creek on 5 December 2003		
	GS	2003/04	14 December 2003	cancelled; replaced in Alta Badia on 14 December 2003		
1196	DH	2004/05	11 December 2004	(Austria) Werner Franz	(Liechtenstein) Marco Büchel	(Austria) Michael Walchhofer
1197	GS	2004/05	12 December 2004	(United States) Bode Miller	(Norway) Lasse Kjus	(Austria) Hermann Maier
1232	DH	2005/06	10 December 2005	(Austria) Michael Walchhofer	(Austria) Fritz Strobl	(Austria) Hans Grugger
1233	SC	2005/06	11 December 2005	(Austria) Michael Walchhofer	(Austria) Rainer Schönfelder	(United States) Bode Miller
	DH	2006/07	9 December 2006	cancelled; replaced in Bormio on 28 December 2006		
	SC	2006/07	10 December 2006	cancelled; replaced in Reiteralm on 10 December 2006		
1282	DH	2006/07	20 January 2007	(France) Pierre-Emmanuel Dalcin	(Canada) Erik Guay	(Canada) Manuel Osborne-Paradis
1639	SG	2016/17	2 December 2016	(Norway) Kjetil Jansrud	(Norway) Aksel Lund Svindal	(Italy) Dominik Paris
1640	DH	2016/17	3 December 2016	(Norway) Kjetil Jansrud	(Italy) Peter Fill	(Norway) Aksel Lund Svindal
1641	GS	2016/17	4 December 2016	(France) Mathieu Faivre	(Austria) Marcel Hirscher	(France) Alexis Pinturault
1787	SG	2020/21	12 December 2020	(Switzerland) Mauro Caviezel	(Norway) Adrian Smiseth Sejersted	(Austria) Christian Walder
1788	DH	2020/21	13 December 2020	(Slovenia) Martin Čater	(Austria) Otmar Striedinger	(Switzerland) Urs Kryenbühl

Not in original calendar and not part of "Critérium of the First Snow" competition. Only replacement for other venues.

=== Women ===
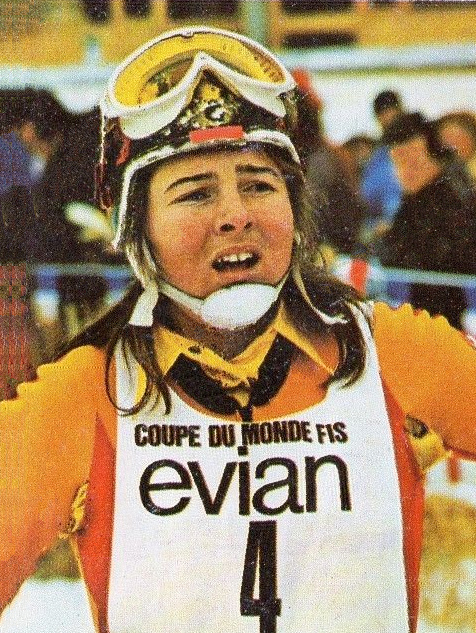
Marie-Theres Nadig (record total 7 wins)

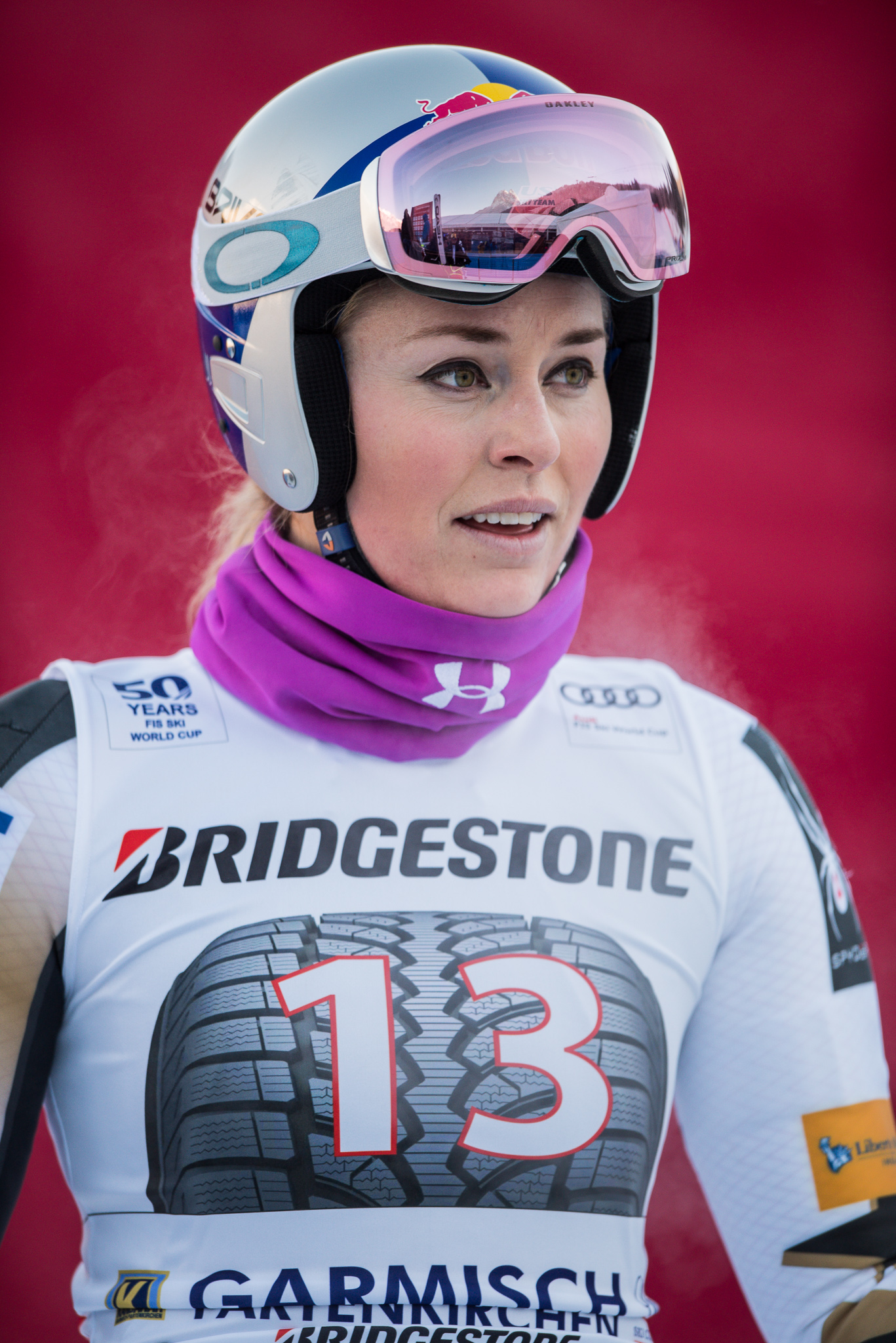
Lindsey Vonn (record total 7 wins)

No.	Type	Season	Date	Winner	Second	Third
41	GS	1968/69	11 December 1968	(France) Françoise Macchi	(West Germany) Rosi Mittermaier	(France) Annie Famose
61	GS	1969/70	10 December 1969	(France) Françoise Macchi	(United States) Barbara Ann Cochran	(France) Michèle Jacot
62	SL	1969/70	12 December 1969	(France) Michèle Jacot	(United States) Barbara Ann Cochran	(France) Florence Steurer
88	SL	1970/71	16 December 1970	(Canada) Betsy Clifford	(France) Florence Steurer	(Austria) Wiltrud Drexel
89	GS	1970/71	19 December 1970	(France) Isabelle Mir	(Austria) Wiltrud Drexel	(France) Michèle Jacot
111	DH	1971/72	11 December 1971	(France) Jacqueline Rouvier	(Austria) Annemarie Pröll	(France) Françoise Macchi
131	DH	1972/73	7 December 1972	(Austria) Annemarie Pröll	(France) Jacqueline Rouvier	(Austria) Irmgard Lukasser
132	SL	1972/73	9 December 1972	(West Germany) Pamela Behr	(France) Odile Chalvin	(France) Patricia Emonet
155	DH	1973/74	6 December 1973	(Austria) Annemarie Pröll	(Austria) Ingrid Gfolner	(Austria) Wiltrud Drexel
156	SL	1973/74	7 December 1973	(West Germany) Christa Zechmeister	(Liechtenstein) Hanni Wenzel	(United States) Marilyn Cochran
172	DH	1974/75	4 December 1974	(Austria) Wiltrud Drexel	(Switzerland) Bernadette Zurbriggen	(France) Danièle Debernard
173	GS	1974/75	7 December 1974	(Austria) Annemarie Moser-Pröll	(Austria) Monika Kaserer	(France) Fabienne Serrat
198	DH	1975/76	3 December 1975	(Switzerland) Bernadette Zurbriggen	(West Germany) Irene Epple	(Switzerland) Marie-Theres Nadig
199	GS	1975/76	4 December 1975	(Switzerland) Lise-Marie Morerod	(West Germany) Rosi Mittermaier	(Austria) Monika Kaserer
224	GS	1976/77	9 December 1976	(Switzerland) Lise-Marie Morerod	(United States) Abbi Fisher	(Austria) Annemarie Moser-Pröll
251	DH	1977/78	7 December 1977	(Switzerland) Marie-Theres Nadig	(Austria) Annemarie Moser-Pröll	(West Germany) Monika Bader
252	GS	1977/78	8 December 1977	(Switzerland) Lise-Marie Morerod	(West Germany) Maria Epple	(Austria) Monika Kaserer
276	DH	1978/79	17 December 1978	(Austria) Annemarie Moser-Pröll	(West Germany) Evi Mittermaier	(Switzerland) Bernadette Zurbriggen
277	GS	1978/79	18 December 1978	(West Germany) Christa Kinshofer	(Liechtenstein) Hanni Wenzel	(Switzerland) Marie-Theres Nadig
278	KB	1978/79	18 December 1978	(Switzerland) Marie-Theres Nadig	(Austria) Annemarie Moser-Pröll	(Liechtenstein) Hanni Wenzel
299	DH	1979/80	5 December 1979	(Switzerland) Marie-Theres Nadig	(United States) Cindy Nelson	(Canada) Laurie Graham
300	GS	1979/80	6 December 1979	(Switzerland) Marie-Theres Nadig	(France) Perrine Pelen	(Switzerland) Erika Hess
301	KB	1979/80	6 December 1979	(Switzerland) Marie-Theres Nadig	(Liechtenstein) Hanni Wenzel	(Austria) Annemarie Moser-Pröll
327	DH	1980/81	3 December 1980	(Switzerland) Marie-Theres Nadig	(Canada) Kathy Kreiner	(West Germany) Irene Epple
328	GS	1980/81	4 December 1980	(West Germany) Irene Epple	(France) Perrine Pelen	(West Germany) Christa Kinshofer
329	KB	1980/81	4 December 1980	(Switzerland) Marie-Theres Nadig	(West Germany) Irene Epple	(West Germany) Christa Kinshofer
360	DH	1981/82	4 December 1981	(West Germany) Irene Epple	(Switzerland) Erika Hess	(United States) Tamara McKinney
365	KB	1981/82	4 December 1981; Val d'Isere (GS) ---------------------------- 18 December 1981; Saalbach (DH)	(West Germany) Irene Epple	(Switzerland) Erika Hess	(West Germany) Christa Kinshofer
391	DH	1982/83	7 December 1982	(Switzerland)	(Austria) Lea Sölkner	(Switzerland) Maria Walliser
392	GS	1982/83	8 December 1982	(Switzerland) Erika Hess	(United States) Tamara McKinney	(Liechtenstein) Hanni Wenzel
393	KB	1982/83	8 December 1982	(Austria) Elisabeth Kirchler	(United States) Tamara McKinney	(Switzerland) Erika Hess
422	DH	1983/84	7 December 1983	(West Germany) Irene Epple	(Switzerland) Ariane Ehrat	(France) Caroline Attia
423	DH	1983/84	8 December 1983	(Switzerland) Maria Walliser	(West Germany) Irene Epple	(Austria) Lea Sölkner
424	GS	1983/84	11 December 1983	(Switzerland) Erika Hess	(France) Perrine Pelen	(Liechtenstein) Hanni Wenzel
425	KB	1983/84	11 December 1983	(West Germany) Irene Epple	(Switzerland) Erika Hess	(Liechtenstein) Hanni Wenzel
427	KB	1983/84	8 December 1983; Val d'Isere (DH2) ---------------------------- 14 December 1983; Sestriere (SL)	(Switzerland) Erika Hess	(Austria) Lea Sölkner	(United States) Christin Cooper
490	DH	1985/86	12 December 1985	(West Germany) Michaela Gerg	(Canada) Laurie Graham	(Switzerland) Maria Walliser
491	KB	1985/86	8 December 1985; Sestriere (SL) ---------------------------- 12 December 1985; Val d'Isere (DH)	(Switzerland) Erika Hess	(Switzerland) Brigitte Örtli	(Switzerland) Maria Walliser
492	DH	1985/86	13 December 1985	(Canada) Laurie Graham	(Switzerland) Maria Walliser	(West Germany) Michaela Gerg
496	KB	1985/86	13 December 1985; Val d'Isere (DH) ---------------------------- 6 January 1986; Maribor (GS)	(Switzerland) Michela Figini	(Switzerland) Maria Walliser	(West Germany) Marina Kiehl
529	DH	1986/87	12 December 1986	(Switzerland) Michela Figini	(Switzerland) Maria Walliser	(Switzerland) Heidi Zurbriggen
530	DH	1986/87	13 December 1986	(Canada) Laurie Graham	(Switzerland) Maria Walliser	(France) Catherine Quittet
531	SG	1986/87	14 December 1986	(Switzerland) Maria Walliser	(France) Catherine Quittet	(Switzerland) Vreni Schneider
559	DH	1987/88	4 December 1987	(Switzerland) Maria Walliser	(Switzerland) Michela Figini	(Switzerland) Zoë Haas
560	DH	1987/88	5 December 1987	(Switzerland) Chantal Bournissen	(West Germany) Marina Kiehl	(West Germany) Ulrike Stanggassinger
586	DH	1988/89	2 December 1988	(Switzerland) Michela Figini	(West Germany) Regine Mösenlechner	(West Germany) Michaela Gerg
805	SG	1995/96	7 December 1995	(Austria) Alexandra Meissnitzer	(Switzerland) Heidi Zeller-Bähler	(Slovenia) Mojca Suhadolc
806	GS	1995/96	8 December 1995	(Germany) Martina Ertl	(Slovenia) Mojca Suhadolc	(Austria) Alexandra Meissnitzer
826	SG	1995/96	2 February 1996	(Germany) Katja Seizinger	(Austria) Renate Götschl	(Germany) Hilde Gerg
827	DH	1995/96	3 February 1996	(Germany) Katja Seizinger	(United States) Picabo Street	(Italy) Isolde Kostner
828	SG	1995/96	4 February 1996	(Germany) Katja Seizinger	(Italy) Isolde Kostner	(Austria) Renate Götschl
843	SG	1996/97	12 December 1996	(Germany) Hilde Gerg	(Germany) Katja Seizinger	(Italy) Isolde Kostner
877	DH	1997/98	17 December 1997	(Germany) Katja Seizinger	(Germany) Hilde Gerg	(Norway) Ingeborg Helen Marken
878	SG	1997/98	18 December 1997	(Germany) Katja Seizinger	(Austria) Renate Götschl	(Germany) Hilde Gerg
879	GS	1997/98	19 December 1997	(Italy) Deborah Compagnoni	(Austria) Alexandra Meissnitzer	(France) Leila Piccard
880	SL	1997/98	20 December 1997	(Sweden) Ylva Nowén	(Italy) Deborah Compagnoni	(Slovenia) Urška Hrovat
881	KB	1997/98	21 December 1997	(Germany) Hilde Gerg	(Germany) Katja Seizinger	(Germany) Martina Ertl
909	SG	1998/99	10 December 1998	(Austria) Alexandra Meissnitzer	(Germany) Martina Ertl	(France) Régine Cavagnoud
910	GS	1998/99	11 December 1998	(Austria) Alexandra Meissnitzer	(Italy) Deborah Compagnoni	(Austria) Anita Wachter
944	SG	1999/00	8 December 1999	(Italy) Isolde Kostner	(Germany) Hilde Gerg	(Sweden) Pernilla Wiberg
945	GS	1999/00	9 December 1999	(Austria) Michaela Dorfmeister	(Austria) Silvia Berger	(France) Régine Cavagnoud
985	SG	2000/01	8 December 1999	(France) Régine Cavagnoud	(Austria) Michaela Dorfmeister	(France) Carole Montillet
1018	SG	2001/02	15 December 2001	(Germany) Hilde Gerg	(Austria) Renate Götschl	(Austria) Tanja Schneider
1019	GS	2001/02	16 December 2001	(Switzerland) Sonja Nef	(Sweden) Anja Pärson	(Austria) Michaela Dorfmeister
1053	GS	2002/03	12 December 2002	(Italy) Karen Putzer	(Switzerland) Sonja Nef	(Austria) Michaela Dorfmeister (Austria) Alexandra Meissnitzer
1054	SG	2002/03	13 December 2002	(France) Carole Montillet	(Italy) Daniela Ceccarelli	(Austria) Michaela Dorfmeister
1153	DH	2005/06	17 December 2005	(United States) Lindsey Kildow	(United States) Caroline Lalive	(Austria) Alexandra Meissnitzer
1154	SG	2005/06	18 December 2005	(Austria) Michaela Dorfmeister	(Austria) Alexandra Meissnitzer	(Canada) Emily Brydon
	DH	2006/07	16 December 2006	replaced in Val d'Isere on 19 December 2006		
	SG	2006/07	17 December 2006	replaced in Reiteralm on 17 December 2006		
1190	DH	2006/07	19 December 2006	(United States) Julia Mancuso	(Austria) Renate Götschl	(United States) Lindsey Kildow
1191	DH	2006/07	20 December 2006	(United States) Lindsey Kildow	(United States) Julia Mancuso	(Sweden) Anja Pärson
1192	SL	2006/07	21 December 2006	(Austria) Marlies Schild	(Germany) Annemarie Gerg	(Sweden) Therese Borssén
	DH	2007/08	15 December 2007	replaced in St. Moritz on 15 December 2007		
	SG	2007/08	16 December 2007	replaced in St. Moritz on 16 December 2007		
1295	SC	2009/10	18 December 2009	(United States) Lindsey Vonn	(Germany) Maria Riesch	(Austria) Elisabeth Görgl
	DH	2009/10	19 December 2009	snowfall & wind; replaced in Haus im Ennstal on 8 January 2009		
1296	SG	2009/10	20 December 2009	(Switzerland) Fränzi Aufdenblatten	(Switzerland) Nadia Styger	(United States) Lindsey Vonn
	SG	2010/11	17 December 2010	from St. Moritz cancelled; then replaced in Cortina d'Ampezzo on 21 January 2011		
1326	DH	2010/11	18 December 2010	(United States) Lindsey Vonn	(Switzerland) Nadja Kamer	(Switzerland) Lara Gut
1327	SC	2010/11	19 December 2010	(United States) Lindsey Vonn	(Austria) Elisabeth Görgl	(Austria) Nicole Hosp
	SG	2011/12	10 December 2011	lack of snow; replaced in Beaver Creek on 7 December 2011		
	SC	2011/12	11 December 2011	lack of snow; replaced in St. Moritz on 29 January 2012		
1398	DH	2012/13	14 December 2012	(Switzerland) Lara Gut	(United States) Leanne Smith	(Switzerland) Nadja Kamer
	SG	2012/13	15 December 2012	heavy snow; replaced in Garmisch-Partenkirchen on 1 March 2013		
1434	DH	2013/14	21 December 2013	(Switzerland) M. Kaufmann-Abderhalden	(Slovenia) Tina Maze	(Austria) Cornelia Hütter
1435	GS	2013/14	22 December 2013	(Liechtenstein) Tina Weirather	(Switzerland) Lara Gut	(Sweden) Maria Pietilä-Holmner
1464	DH	2014/15	20 December 2014	(United States) Lindsey Vonn	(Austria) Elisabeth Görgl (Germany) Viktoria Rebensburg	
1465	SG	2014/15	21 December 2014	(Austria) Elisabeth Görgl	(Austria) Anna Fenninger	(Slovenia) Tina Maze
1496	AC	2015/16	18 December 2015	(Switzerland) Lara Gut	(United States) Lindsey Vonn	(Austria) Michaela Kirchgasser
1497	DH	2015/16	19 December 2015	(Switzerland) Lara Gut	(Switzerland) Fabienne Suter	(Canada) Larisa Yurkiw
1536	AC	2016/17	16 December 2016	(Slovenia) Ilka Štuhec	(Switzerland) Michelle Gisin	(Italy) Sofia Goggia
1537	DH	2016/17	17 December 2016	(Slovenia) Ilka Štuhec	(Austria) Cornelia Hütter	(Italy) Sofia Goggia
1538	SG	2016/17	18 December 2016	(Switzerland) Lara Gut	(Liechtenstein) Tina Weirather	(Italy) Elena Curtoni
	DH	2017/18	16 December 2017	both trainings cancelled; replaced in Cortina d'Ampezzo on 19 January 2018		
1572	SG	2017/18	16 December 2017	(United States) Lindsey Vonn	(Italy) Sofia Goggia	(Norway) Ragnhild Mowinckel
1573	SG	2017/18	17 December 2017	(Austria) Anna Veith	(Liechtenstein) Tina Weirather	(Italy) Sofia Goggia
	AC	2018/19	14 December 2018	cancelled due to warm weather and lack of snow		
	DH	2018/19	15 December 2018	warm weather and lack of snow; replaced in Val Gardena on 18 December 2018		
	SG	2018/19	16 December 2018	warm weather and lack of snow; replaced in Val Gardena on 19 December 2018		
	DH	2019/20	21 December 2019	heavy snowfall; planned reschedule in Val d'Isère on 22 December 2019		
	AC	2019/20	22 December 2019	cancelled due to switched program schedule with downhill		
	DH	2019/20	22 December 2019	finally cancelled due to heavy snowfall again; replaced in Bansko on 24 January 2020		
1673	DH	2020/21	18 December 2020	(Switzerland) Corinne Suter	(Italy) Sofia Goggia	(United States) Breezy Johnson
1674	DH	2020/21	19 December 2020	(Italy) Sofia Goggia	(Switzerland) Corinne Suter	(United States) Breezy Johnson
1675	SG	2020/21	20 December 2020	(Czech Republic) Ester Ledecká	(Switzerland) Corinne Suter	(Italy) Federica Brignone
1708	DH	2021/22	18 December 2021	(Italy) Sofia Goggia	(United States) Breezy Johnson	(Austria) Mirjam Puchner
1709	SG	2021/22	19 December 2021	(Italy) Sofia Goggia	(Norway) Ragnhild Mowinckel	(Italy) Elena Curtoni
1857	DH	2025/26	20 December 2025	(Austria) Cornelia Hütter	(Germany) Kira Weidle-Winkelmann	(United States) Lindsey Vonn
1858	SG	2025/26	21 December 2025	(Italy) Sofia Goggia	(New Zealand) Alice Robinson	(United States) Lindsey Vonn

== Club5+ ==
In 1986, elite Club5 was originally founded by prestigious classic downhill organizers: Kitzbühel, Wengen, Garmisch, Val d’Isère and Val Gardena/Gröden, with goal to bring alpine ski sport on the highest levels possible.

Later over the years other classic longterm organizers joined the now named Club5+: Alta Badia, Cortina, Kranjska Gora, Maribor, Lake Louise, Schladming, Adelboden, Kvitfjell, St.Moritz and Åre.

== Fatal accidents ==
On 9 January 1988, just before the World Cup dowhnill race, tragic accident happened, when a young man who was driving a snowcat crashed with it into the chairlift column and lost his life.

On 8 December 2001, Silvano Beltrametti crashed at full speed at World Cup downhill race under the safety nets outside the course into the tree ending on a wheel chair. A day before he was 3rd in super-G.
