= 1998–99 FIS Alpine Ski World Cup =

International sports competition

FIS Alpine Ski World Cup 1998/99
Discipline	Men	Women
Overall	(Norway) Lasse Kjus	(Austria) Alexandra Meissnitzer
Downhill	(Norway) Lasse Kjus	(Austria) Renate Götschl
Super G	(Austria) Hermann Maier	(Austria) Alexandra Meissnitzer
Giant Slalom	(Switzerland) Michael von Grünigen	(Austria) Alexandra Meissnitzer
Slalom	(Austria) Thomas Stangassinger	(Austria) Sabine Egger
Nations Cup	Austria	Austria
- Nations Cup overall: Austria

Competition
Locations	18	14
Individual	35	36

The 33rd World Cup season began in October 1998 in Sölden, Austria, and concluded in March 1999 at the World Cup finals at Sierra Nevada, Spain. The overall winners were Lasse Kjus of Norway, his second, and Alexandra Meissnitzer of Austria, her first.

A break in the schedule was for the World Championships, held 2–14 February in the United States at Vail and Beaver Creek, Colorado.

Two-time (and defending) World Cup overall winner Katja Seizinger from Germany missed the entire season due to a severe knee injury suffered in June 1998. She retired in April 1999 at age 26 with eleven season titles (two overall, four downhill, and five super-G).

== Calendar ==
=== Men ===
Event Key: DH – Downhill, SL – Slalom, GS – Giant Slalom, SG – Super Giant Slalom, KB – Combined
Race	Season	Date	Place	Type	Winner	Second	Third
970	1	25 October 1998	(Austria) Sölden	GS _{247}	(Austria) Hermann Maier	(Austria) Stephan Eberharter	(Austria) Heinz Schilchegger
971	2	20 November 1998	(United States) Park City	GS _{248}	(Austria) Stephan Eberharter	(Austria) Christian Mayer	(Liechtenstein) Marco Büchel
972	3	22 November 1998	(United States) Park City	SL _{284}	(France) Pierrick Bourgeat	(Norway) Hans Petter Buraas	(Austria) Christian Mayer
973	4	27 November 1998	(United States) Aspen	SG _{080}	(Austria) Stephan Eberharter	(Austria) Hermann Maier	(Austria) Christian Mayer
974	5	28 November 1998	(United States) Aspen	SL _{285}	(Austria) Thomas Stangassinger	(France) Sébastien Amiez	(Norway) Tom Stiansen
975	6	12 December 1998	(France) Val d'Isère	DH _{285}	(Norway) Lasse Kjus	(Italy) Luca Cattaneo	(Italy) Erik Seletto
976	7	13 December 1998	(France) Val d'Isère	SG _{081}	(Austria) Hermann Maier	(Austria) Stephan Eberharter	(Norway) Lasse Kjus
977	8	14 December 1998	(Italy) Sestriere	SL _{286}	(Norway) Finn Christian Jagge	(Austria) Thomas Stangassinger	(Slovenia) Jure Košir
978	9	18 December 1998	(Italy) Val Gardena	DH _{286}	(Norway) Lasse Kjus	(Austria) Werner Franz	(Austria) Hermann Maier
979	10	19 December 1998	(Italy) Val Gardena	DH _{287}	(Italy) Kristian Ghedina	(Norway) Lasse Kjus	(Austria) Werner Franz
980	11	20 December 1998	(Italy) Alta Badia	GS _{249}	(Switzerland) Michael von Grünigen	(Italy) Patrick Holzer	(Austria) Andreas Schifferer
981	12	21 December 1998	(Austria) Innsbruck	SG _{082}	(Austria) Hermann Maier	(Austria) Christian Mayer	(Austria) Fritz Strobl
982	13	29 December 1998	(Italy) Bormio	DH _{288}	(Austria) Hermann Maier	(Austria) Fritz Strobl	(Austria) Stephan Eberharter
983	14	5 January 1999	(Slovenia) Kranjska Gora	GS _{250}	(Italy) Patrick Holzer	(Austria) Christian Mayer	(Austria) Hans Knauß
984	15	6 January 1999	(Slovenia) Kranjska Gora	SL _{287}	(Slovenia) Jure Košir	(Austria) Thomas Stangassinger	(Austria) Benjamin Raich
985	16	7 January 1999	(Austria) Schladming	SL _{288}	(Austria) Benjamin Raich	(France) Pierrick Bourgeat	(Norway) Kjetil André Aamodt
986	17	9 January 1999	(Austria) Schladming	SG _{083}	(Austria) Hermann Maier	(Austria) Rainer Salzgeber	(Austria) Hans Knauß
987	18	10 January 1999	(Austria) Flachau	GS _{251}	(Austria) Benjamin Raich	(Switzerland) Michael von Grünigen	(Austria) Hermann Maier
988	19	12 January 1999	(Switzerland) Adelboden	GS _{252}	(Austria) Hermann Maier	(Norway) Kjetil André Aamodt	(Austria) Benjamin Raich
989	20	16 January 1999	(Switzerland) Wengen	DH _{289}	(Norway) Lasse Kjus	(Austria) Hannes Trinkl	(Austria) Hans Knauß
990	21	17 January 1999	(Switzerland) Wengen	SL _{289}	(Austria) Benjamin Raich	(Switzerland) Michael von Grünigen	(Norway) Lasse Kjus
991	22	17 January 1999	(Switzerland) Wengen	KB _{076}	(Norway) Lasse Kjus	(Norway) Kjetil André Aamodt	(Austria) Hermann Maier
992	23	22 January 1999	(Austria) Kitzbühel	DH _{290}	(Norway) Lasse Kjus	(Norway) Kjetil André Aamodt	(Austria) Werner Franz
993	24	23 January 1999	(Austria) Kitzbühel	DH _{291}	(Austria) Hans Knauß	(Austria) Peter Rzehak	(Austria) Werner Franz
994	25	24 January 1999	(Austria) Kitzbühel	SL _{290}	(Slovenia) Jure Košir	(Switzerland) Didier Plaschy	(Italy) Giorgio Rocca
995	26	24 January 1999	(Austria) Kitzbühel	KB _{077}	(Norway) Kjetil André Aamodt	(Norway) Lasse Kjus	(Switzerland) Paul Accola
World Championships (2–14 February)
996	27	27 February 1999	(Germany) Ofterschwang	GS _{253}	(Austria) Stephan Eberharter	(Austria) Hans Knauß	(Switzerland) Michael von Grünigen
997	28	28 February 1999	(Germany) Ofterschwang	SL _{291}	(Norway) Finn Christian Jagge	(Austria) Thomas Stangassinger	(Norway) Kjetil André Aamodt
998	29	5 March 1999	(Norway) Kvitfjell	DH _{292}	(Austria) Andreas Schifferer	(Austria) Stephan Eberharter	(Norway) Kjetil André Aamodt
999	30	6 March 1999	(Norway) Kvitfjell	DH _{293}	(Austria) Andreas Schifferer	(Norway) Lasse Kjus	(Austria) Stephan Eberharter
1000	31	7 March 1999	(Norway) Kvitfjell	SG _{084}	(Austria) Hermann Maier	(Austria) Stephan Eberharter	(Austria) Andreas Schifferer
1001	32	10 March 1999	(Spain) Sierra Nevada	DH _{294}	(Norway) Lasse Kjus	(United States) Chad Fleischer	(Norway) Audun Grønvold
1002	33	11 March 1999	(Spain) Sierra Nevada	SG _{085}	(Austria) Christian Mayer	(Austria) Andreas Schifferer	(Austria) Josef Strobl
1003	34	13 March 1999	(Spain) Sierra Nevada	SL _{292}	(Austria) Thomas Stangassinger	(Norway) Kjetil André Aamodt	(Switzerland) Marco Casanova
1004	35	14 March 1999	(Spain) Sierra Nevada	GS _{254}	(Switzerland) Michael von Grünigen	(Switzerland) Steve Locher	(Austria) Heinz Schilchegger

=== Ladies ===
Event Key: DH – Downhill, SL – Slalom, GS – Giant Slalom, SG – Super Giant Slalom, KB – Combined
Race	Season	Date	Place	Type	Winner	Second	Third
901	1	24 October 1998	(Austria) Sölden	GS _{240}	(Norway) Andrine Flemmen	(Austria) Alexandra Meissnitzer	(Italy) Deborah Compagnoni
902	2	19 November 1998	(United States) Park City	GS _{241}	(Austria) Alexandra Meissnitzer	(Germany) Martina Ertl	(Liechtenstein) Birgit Heeb
903	3	21 November 1998	(United States) Park City	SL _{276}	(Slovenia) Urška Hrovat	(Austria) Sabine Egger	(Croatia) Janica Kostelić
904	4	27 November 1998	(Canada) Lake Louise	DH _{237}	(Austria) Renate Götschl	(Italy) Isolde Kostner	(Switzerland) Corinne Rey-Bellet
905	5	28 November 1998	(Canada) Lake Louise	DH _{238}	(Austria) Renate Götschl	(Italy) Isolde Kostner	(Germany) Regina Häusl
906	6	29 November 1998	(Canada) Lake Louise	SG _{083}	(Austria) Alexandra Meissnitzer	(Sweden) Pernilla Wiberg	(Germany) Hilde Gerg
907	7	3 December 1998	(United States) Mammoth Mountain	SL _{277}	(Sweden) Anja Pärson	(Australia) Zali Steggall	(Austria) Ingrid Salvenmoser
908	8	4 December 1998	(United States) Mammoth Mountain	SG _{084}	(Austria) Christiane Mitterwallner	(Austria) Renate Götschl	(Germany) Martina Ertl
909	9	10 December 1998	(France) Val d'Isère	SG _{085}	(Austria) Alexandra Meissnitzer	(Germany) Martina Ertl	(France) Régine Cavagnoud
910	10	11 December 1998	(France) Val d'Isère	GS _{242}	(Austria) Alexandra Meissnitzer	(Italy) Deborah Compagnoni	(Austria) Anita Wachter
911	11	18 December 1998	(Switzerland) Veysonnaz	DH _{239}	(Germany) Hilde Gerg	(Sweden) Pernilla Wiberg	(Italy) Bibiana Perez
912	12	19 December 1998	(Switzerland) Veysonnaz	DH _{240}	(Austria) Alexandra Meissnitzer	(France) Régine Cavagnoud	(Austria) Renate Götschl
913	13	20 December 1998	(Switzerland) Veysonnaz	SL _{278}	(Switzerland) Karin Roten	(United States) Kristina Koznick	(Sweden) Anja Pärson
914	14	20 December 1998	(Switzerland) Veysonnaz	KB _{066}	(Germany) Hilde Gerg	(Germany) Martina Ertl	(Norway) Trude Gimle
915	15	27 December 1998	(Austria) Semmering	GS _{243}	(Austria) Anita Wachter	(Austria) Alexandra Meissnitzer	(Norway) Andrine Flemmen
916	16	28 December 1998	(Austria) Semmering	SL _{279}	(United States) Kristina Koznick	(Switzerland) Karin Roten	(Sweden) Pernilla Wiberg
917	17	2 January 1999	(Slovenia) Maribor	SG _{086}	(Germany) Hilde Gerg	(Germany) Martina Ertl	(Austria) Michaela Dorfmeister
918	18	2 January 1999	(Slovenia) Maribor	GS _{244}	(Austria) Anita Wachter	(Switzerland) Sonja Nef	(Austria) Alexandra Meissnitzer
919	19	3 January 1999	(Slovenia) Maribor	SL _{280}	(Sweden) Pernilla Wiberg	(Germany) Hilde Gerg	(Sweden) Ylva Nowén
920	20	8 January 1999	(Germany) Berchtesgaden	SL _{281}	(Austria) Sabine Egger	(Austria) Ingrid Salvenmoser	(Sweden) Pernilla Wiberg
921	21	16 January 1999	(Austria) St. Anton am Arlberg	DH _{241}	(Switzerland) Corinne Rey-Bellet	(Austria) Michaela Dorfmeister	(Germany) Hilde Gerg
922	22	16 January 1999	(Austria) St. Anton am Arlberg	SG _{087}	(Switzerland) Corinne Rey-Bellet	(Austria) Alexandra Meissnitzer	(Austria) Michaela Dorfmeister
923	23	17 January 1999	(Austria) St. Anton am Arlberg	SL _{282}	(Norway) Trine Bakke	(Sweden) Anja Pärson	(Croatia) Janica Kostelić
924	24	17 January 1999	(Austria) St. Anton am Arlberg	KB _{067}	(Croatia) Janica Kostelić	(Germany) Hilde Gerg	(Norway) Trude Gimle
925	25	21 January 1999	(Italy) Cortina d'Ampezzo	DH _{242}	(France) Régine Cavagnoud	(Italy) Isolde Kostner	(Germany) Hilde Gerg
926	26	22 January 1999	(Italy) Cortina d'Ampezzo	SG _{088}	(Austria) Renate Götschl	(Germany) Martina Ertl	(France) Régine Cavagnoud
927	27	23 January 1999	(Italy) Cortina d'Ampezzo	SG _{089}	(France) Régine Cavagnoud	(Switzerland) Sylviane Berthod	(Austria) Michaela Dorfmeister
928	28	24 January 1999	(Italy) Cortina d'Ampezzo	GS _{245}	(Austria) Alexandra Meissnitzer	(Germany) Martina Ertl	(Austria) Anita Wachter
World Championships (2–14 February)
929	29	22 February 1999	(Sweden) Åre	GS _{246}	(Austria) Alexandra Meissnitzer	(Austria) Anita Wachter	(Norway) Andrine Flemmen
930	30	23 February 1999	(Sweden) Åre	SL _{283}	(Slovenia) Špela Pretnar	(Norway) Trine Bakke	(Sweden) Anja Pärson
931	31	24 February 1999	(Sweden) Åre	GS _{247}	(Austria) Anita Wachter	(Norway) Andrine Flemmen	(Switzerland) Sonja Nef
932	32	27 February 1999	(Sweden) Åre	DH _{243}	(Austria) Renate Götschl	(Austria) Michaela Dorfmeister	(Germany) Regina Häusl
933	33	5 March 1999	(Switzerland) St. Moritz	DH _{244}	(Austria) Renate Götschl	(Austria) Michaela Dorfmeister	(Italy) Isolde Kostner
934	34	6 March 1999	(Switzerland) St. Moritz	SG _{090}	(Austria) Michaela Dorfmeister	(Austria) Renate Götschl	(United States) Kathleen Monahan
935	35	10 March 1999	(Spain) Sierra Nevada	DH _{245}	(Austria) Alexandra Meissnitzer	(Norway) Ingeborg Helen Marken	(Canada) Mélanie Turgeon
936	36	13 March 1999	(Spain) Sierra Nevada	GS _{248}	(Austria) Anita Wachter	(Sweden) Anna Ottosson	(Norway) Andrine Flemmen

== Men ==
=== Overall ===
Place	Name	Country	Total
1	Lasse Kjus	Norway	1465
2	Kjetil André Aamodt	Norway	1442
3	Hermann Maier	Austria	1307
4	Stephan Eberharter	Austria	1079
5	Hans Knauss	Austria	913
6	Andreas Schifferer	Austria	901
7	Christian Mayer	Austria	766
8	Michael von Grünigen	Switzerland	705
9	Werner Franz	Austria	614
10	Benjamin Raich	Austria	575

=== Downhill ===
Place	Name	Country	Total
1	Lasse Kjus	Norway	760
2	Andreas Schifferer	Austria	438
3	Werner Franz	Austria	427
4	Hans Knauss	Austria	399
5	Kjetil André Aamodt	Norway	397

=== Super G ===
Place	Name	Country	Total
1	Hermann Maier	Austria	516
2	Stephan Eberharter	Austria	330
3	Andreas Schifferer	Austria	262
4	Christian Mayer	Austria	252
5	Hans Knauss	Austria	233

=== Giant Slalom ===
Place	Name	Country	Total
1	Michael von Grünigen	Switzerland	483
2	Stephan Eberharter	Austria	410
3	Hermann Maier	Austria	371
4	Kjetil André Aamodt	Norway	335
5	Christian Mayer	Austria	297

=== Slalom ===
Place	Name	Country	Total
1	Thomas Stangassinger	Austria	566
2	Jure Košir	Slovenia	415
3	Finn Christian Jagge	Norway	386
4	Kjetil André Aamodt	Norway	363
	Pierrick Bourgeat	France	363

=== Combined ===
Place	Name	Country	Total
1	Lasse Kjus	Norway	180
	Kjetil André Aamodt	Norway	180
3	Werner Franz	Austria	100
4	Didier Cuche	Switzerland	81
5	Markus Herrmann	Switzerland	64

== Ladies ==
=== Overall ===
Place	Name	Country	Total
1	Alexandra Meissnitzer	Austria	1672
2	Hilde Gerg	Germany	1179
3	Renate Götschl	Austria	1035
4	Martina Ertl	Germany	987
5	Pernilla Wiberg	Sweden	924
6	Michaela Dorfmeister	Austria	920
7	Régine Cavagnoud	France	764
8	Anita Wachter	Austria	756
9	Andrine Flemmen	Norway	728
10	Corinne Rey-Bellet	Switzerland	720

=== Downhill ===
Place	Name	Country	Total
1	Renate Götschl	Austria	610
2	Alexandra Meissnitzer	Austria	468
3	Michaela Dorfmeister	Austria	454
4	Hilde Gerg	Germany	431
5	Isolde Kostner	Italy	371

=== Super G ===
Place	Name	Country	Total
1	Alexandra Meissnitzer	Austria	459
2	Michaela Dorfmeister	Austria	373
3	Martina Ertl	Germany	340
4	Régine Cavagnoud	France	335
5	Renate Götschl	Austria	308

=== Giant Slalom ===
Place	Name	Country	Total
1	Alexandra Meissnitzer	Austria	652
2	Anita Wachter	Austria	636
3	Andrine Flemmen	Norway	518
4	Sonja Nef	Switzerland	353
5	Anna Ottosson	Sweden	313

=== Slalom ===
Place	Name	Country	Total
1	Sabine Egger	Austria	425
2	Pernilla Wiberg	Sweden	415
3	Anja Pärson	Sweden	374
4	Trine Bakke	Norway	335
5	Ingrid Salvenmoser	Austria	292

=== Combined ===
Place	Name	Country	Total
1	Hilde Gerg	Germany	180
2	Janica Kostelić	Croatia	150
3	Trude Gimle	Norway	120
4	Michaela Dorfmeister	Austria	82
5	Alexandra Meissnitzer	Austria	81
