= Werner Franz =

Austrian alpine skier

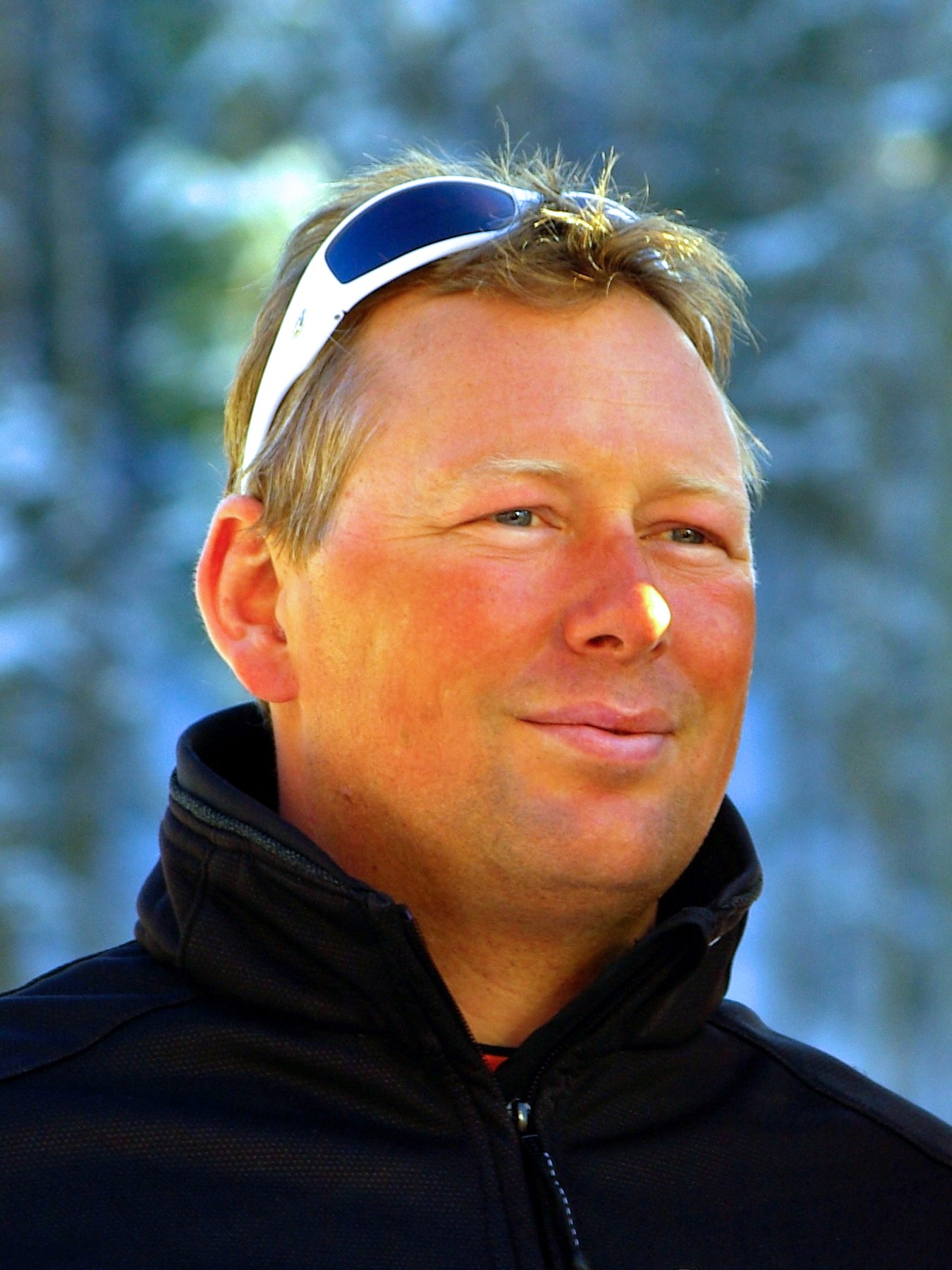

Medal record

Alpine skiing

World Cup
Silver medal – second place	2000 World Cup	Super G Cup
Bronze medal – third place	1999 World Cup	Downhill Cup

European Cup
Gold medal – first place	1991-92 European Cup	Downhill Cup

Werner Franz (born 8 March 1972) is a former Austrian alpine skier.

Franz was born in Weissbriach and he could already be found in the mountains at the age of 2, learning his first skiing techniques. He was coached by his father who was determined to make a professional skier out of his son. When Werner won an amateur race against young skiers of his own age he was complimented by his father who gave him newer and better skiing equipment as a present.

The good performances in his younger years gave him self-confidence, which resulted in his goals to achieve. To reach these goals he had to train and concentrate hard on his sports career and succeeded. Werner Franz developed himself as a skier specialising in the speed disciplines of downhill and Super G.

Franz joined the Austrian national World Cup team in 1990. In the 1991-92 season he won his first race in the European Cup, which immediately secured him the overall win in the downhill European Cup rankings. Unless the win he was not able to win any of the following races, but during the World Cup meeting in Val Gardena in the 1993-94 season he finished in second position. In the following year he repeated this achievement by finishing second at the race in Wengen. He also skied himself into several top 10 results.

In the following years he was a constant factor in top 10 standings, but was unable to win any races. In 1995-96 he came second at the Austrian national Championships in downhill. Finally, during the 1999-2000 season Franz won his first World Cup race by finishing in front of all his opponents except Fritz Strobl in the Super G race in Sankt Anton; Strobl and Franz finished in exactly the same time and shared the victory. This result and a fourth place later in the same weekend earned him the fifth position in the overall Super G World Cup of that season.

On 29 October 2001 his career was put on hold when he fell during a training run in Sölden. A heavy knee injury kept him out for the whole 2001-02 and 2002-03 seasons. Due to his recuperation program, hard training and mental strength he was able to fight himself back into the Austrian team for the 2003-04 season. Motivated he started the season after switching equipment sponsors. However he faced another injury in January 2004 during a training in Bad Kleinkirchheim, which ended his season immediately.

In the 2004-05 winter Franz made his comeback in the World Cup circuit and won his first World Cup points by finishing 22nd in Lake Louise. Later in the season, during the downhill of Val-d'Isère he finished in first position and claimed his second career World Cup win. A fifth place in Wengen and several other top 10 results during the season confirmed his comeback. He was however not able to win anymore races during that season and during the summer of 2005 in Chile he faced another long term injury which kept him aside for the whole 2005-06 season. On 14 December 2006, only a few races into the new season he announced his retirement from international races, just one day after Andreas Schifferer did the same.

He is the cousin of alpine skier Max Franz.

== Statistics ==
	downhill	super g	combined	total
World Cup victories	1	1	0	2
World Cup podiums	13	4	2	19
World Cup top tens	47	14	8	69

World Cup victories
date	venue	discipline
13 February 2000	(Austria) Sankt Anton	Super G
11 December 2004	(France) Val-d'Isère	Downhill

First World Cup start	(United States) 1992 Aspen
First World Cup points	(United States) 1992 Aspen
First World Cup podium	(Italy) 1993 Val Gardena

Statistics updated until: 26 November 2006
