= Super-G =

Racing discipline of alpine skiing

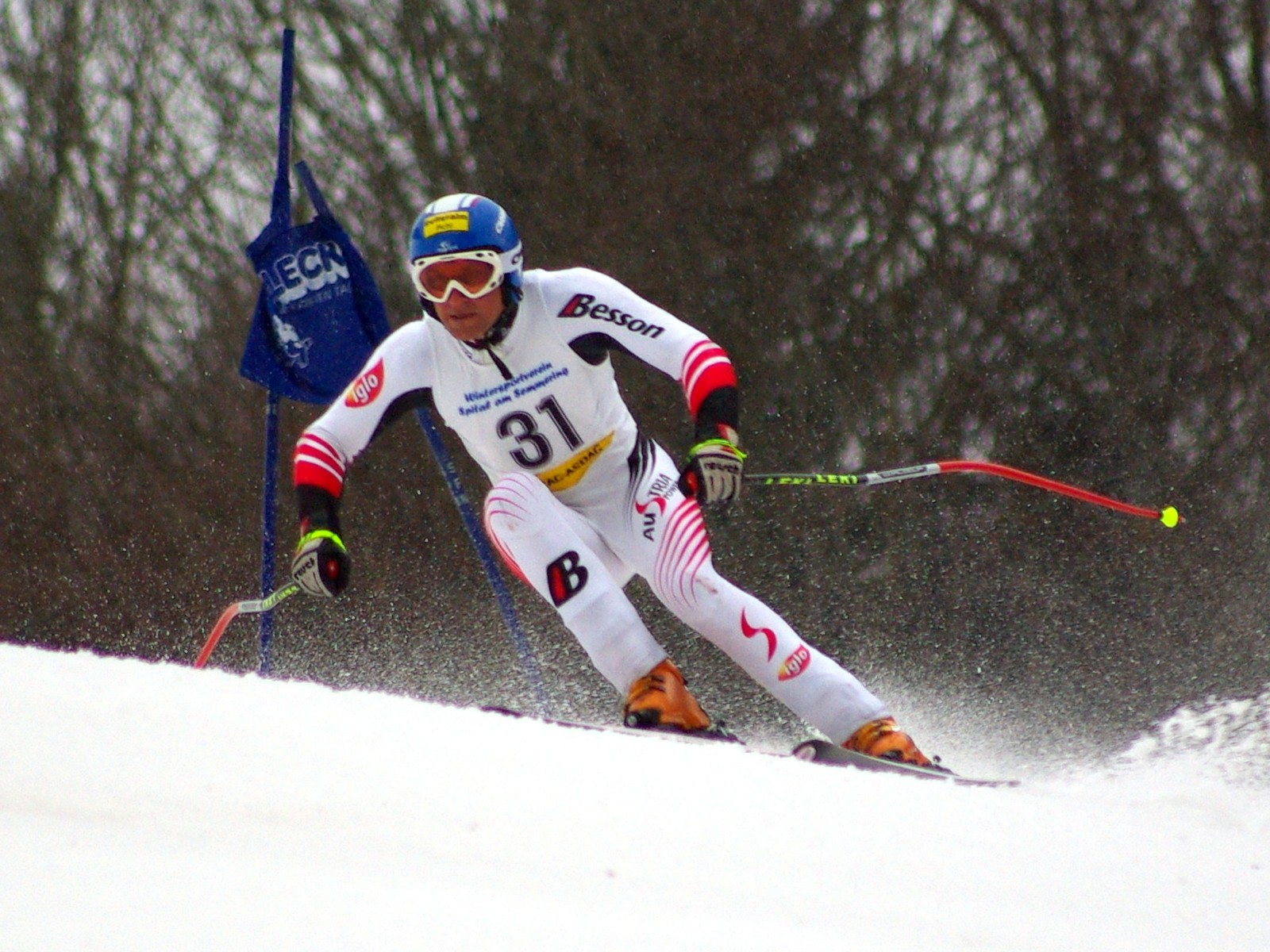
Austrian alpine skier Christoph Kornberger competing in super-G

Super giant slalom, or super-G, is a racing discipline of alpine skiing. Along with the faster downhill, it is regarded as a "speed" event, in contrast to the technical events giant slalom and slalom. It debuted as an official World Cup event during the 1983 season and was added to the official schedule of the World Championships in 1987 and the Winter Olympics in 1988.

Much like downhill, a super-G course consists of widely set gates that racers must pass through. The course is set so that skiers must turn more than in downhill, though the speeds are still much higher than in giant slalom (hence the name). Each athlete only has one run to clock the best time. In the Olympics, super-G courses are usually set on the same slopes as the downhill, but with a lower starting point.

== History ==
Super-G was run as a World Cup test event during the 1982 season, with two men's races and a women's race that did not count in the season standings.

Approved by the International Ski Federation (FIS) that summer, it was first officially run at the World Cup level in December 1982 at Val-d'Isère, France; the winner was Peter Müller of Switzerland. The first official women's super-G was run a month later in early January 1983, with consecutive events at Verbier, Switzerland. The first winner was Irene Epple of West Germany, and Cindy Nelson of the United States won the next day on a different course.

These were the only two races for women in super-G during the 1983 season; the men had three. The event was not universally embraced during its early years, which included a boycott by two-time defending overall champion Phil Mahre in December 1982.

For the first three seasons, super-G results were added into the giant slalom discipline for the season standings; it gained separate status for a crystal globe for the 1986 season with five events for both men and women; the first champions were Markus Wasmeier and Marina Kiehl, both of West Germany.

It was added to the World Championships in 1987, held at Crans-Montana, Switzerland. Swiss skiers Pirmin Zurbriggen and Maria Walliser won gold medals to become the first world champions in the event. Super-G made its Olympic debut in 1988 in Calgary, where Franck Piccard of France and Sigrid Wolf of Austria took gold at Nakiska.

== Top racers ==
=== Men ===
Hermann Maier of Austria (nicknamed 'The Herminator') is widely regarded as the greatest male super-G racer, with 24 World Cup victories and five World Cup titles (1998–2001, 2004). He won the world championship in 1999 and an Olympic gold medal in 1998, three days after a crash in the downhill.

Maier's proficiency in super-G was attributed to his thorough course inspection and his aggressive course tactics; he opted for the most direct and dangerous line down the hill. A serious motorcycle accident in August 2001 nearly resulted in an amputation of his lower right leg and sidelined him for the 2002 season, including the 2002 Olympics. After his return to the World Cup circuit in January 2003, Maier won eight more World Cup super-G events and his fifth season title in 2004.

Aksel Lund Svindal of Norway and Marco Odermatt of Switzerland are tied for second on the list with 17 wins in World Cup super-G races and Kjetil Jansrud is fourth with his 13 wins. Svindal won Olympic gold in 2010 and his fifth season title in 2014.

Pirmin Zurbriggen won four consecutive season titles (1987–90) and was the first world champion of this discipline in 1987.

Kjetil André Aamodt of Norway, a triple gold medalist in Olympic super-G races, winning in 1992, 2002 and 2006. Aamodt won five World Cup races and two world championship medals (silver and bronze) in the discipline.

Marc Girardelli of Luxembourg, a five-time overall World Cup champion, won nine World Cup super-G events. He won season titles in every discipline except super-G, where he was a runner-up three times. Girardelli was the silver medalist in the super-G at the 1987 World Championships and the 1992 Olympics.

=== Women ===
Lindsey Vonn of the U.S. leads with 28 World Cup victories in super-G and has won five season titles (2009–2012, 2015).

Lara Gut-Behrami of Switzerland has won 24 World Cup races, six season titles (2014, 2016, 2021, 2023, 2024, 2025), and a Gold medal in the event at the 2022 Winter Olympics.

Katja Seizinger of Germany won five season titles in the 1990s, with 16 World Cup wins in the discipline.

Neither Vonn nor Seizinger has won gold in the super-G at the Olympics (both won a bronze) while Gut-Behrami has. However, all three of them have won a world title, Vonn in 2009, Gut-Behrami in 2021 and Seizinger in 1993.

Renate Götschl of Austria won 17 World Cup events in super-G, three season titles, and two medals (silver and bronze) in the world championships.

== Course ==
The vertical drop for a super-G course must be between 350–650 m (1,150–2,130 ft) for men, 350–600 m (1,150–1,970 ft) for women, and 250–450 m (820–1,480 ft) for children.

In the Olympic Winter Games, FIS World Ski Championships, and FIS World Cups, minimums are raised to 400 m (1,300 ft) for both men and women. Courses are normally at least 30 m (98 ft) in width, but sections with lower widths are permissible if the line and terrain before and after allow it. Higher widths can also be required if deemed necessary. Gates must be between 6 m (20 ft) and 8 m (26 ft) in width for open gates, and between 8 m (26 ft) and 12 m (39 ft) in width for vertical gates. The distance between turning poles of successive gates must be at least 25 m (82 ft). The number of direction changes must be at least 7% of the course drop in meters (6% for Olympic Winter Games, FIS World Ski Championships and FIS World Cups).

== Equipment ==
In an attempt to increase safety, the 2004 season saw the FIS impose minimum ski lengths for the super-G for the first time: to 205 cm (80.7 in) for men and 200 cm (78.7 in) for women. The minimum turning radius was increased to 45 m (148 ft) for the 2014 season.

== World Cup podiums ==
Men

The following table contains the men's Super-G (from 2007 Super combined) World Cup podiums since the first edition in 1986.

Season	1st	2nd	3rd
1986	(Germany) Markus Wasmeier	(Switzerland) Pirmin Zurbriggen	(Luxembourg) Marc Girardelli
1987	(Switzerland) Pirmin Zurbriggen	(Luxembourg) Marc Girardelli	(Germany) Markus Wasmeier
1988	(Switzerland) Pirmin Zurbriggen	(Germany) Markus Wasmeier	(France) Franck Piccard
1989	(Switzerland) Pirmin Zurbriggen	(Sweden) Lars-Börje Eriksson	(France) Franck Piccard
1990	(Switzerland) Pirmin Zurbriggen	(Austria) Günther Mader	(Sweden) Lars-Börje Eriksson
1991	(Switzerland) Franz Heinzer	(Austria) Stephan Eberharter	(Norway) Atle Skårdal
1992	(Switzerland) Paul Accola	(Luxembourg) Marc Girardelli	(Austria) Günther Mader
1993	(Norway) Kjetil André Aamodt	(Austria) Günther Mader	(Switzerland) Franz Heinzer
1994	(Norway) Jan Einar Thorsen	(Luxembourg) Marc Girardelli	(United States) Tommy Moe
1995	(Italy) Peter Runggaldier	(Austria) Günther Mader	(Italy) Werner Perathoner
1996	(Norway) Atle Skårdal	(Austria) Hans Knauß	(Norway) Lasse Kjus
1997	(France) Luc Alphand	(Austria) Josef Strobl	(Austria) Andreas Schifferer
1998	(Austria) Hermann Maier	(Austria) Hans Knauß	(Austria) Stephan Eberharter
1999	(Austria) Hermann Maier	(Austria) Stephan Eberharter	(Austria) Andreas Schifferer
2000	(Austria) Hermann Maier	(Austria) Werner Franz	(Austria) Fritz Strobl
2001	(Austria) Hermann Maier	(Austria) Christoph Gruber	(Austria) Josef Strobl
2002	(Austria) Stephan Eberharter	(Switzerland) Didier Cuche	(Austria) Fritz Strobl
2003	(Austria) Stephan Eberharter	(Liechtenstein) Marco Büchel	(Switzerland) Didier Cuche
2004	(Austria) Hermann Maier	(United States) Daron Rahlves	(Austria) Stephan Eberharter
2005	(United States) Bode Miller	(Austria) Hermann Maier	(United States) Daron Rahlves
2006	(Norway) Aksel Lund Svindal	(Austria) Hermann Maier	(United States) Daron Rahlves
2007	(United States) Bode Miller	(Switzerland) Didier Cuche	(Canada) John Kucera
2008	(Austria) Hannes Reichelt	(Switzerland) Didier Cuche	(Austria) Benjamin Raich
2009	(Norway) Aksel Lund Svindal	(Italy) Werner Heel	(Switzerland) Didier Défago
2010	(Canada) Erik Guay	(Austria) Michael Walchhofer	(Norway) Aksel Lund Svindal
2011	(Switzerland) Didier Cuche	(Austria) Georg Streitberger	(Croatia) Ivica Kostelić
2012	(Norway) Aksel Lund Svindal	(Switzerland) Didier Cuche	(Switzerland) Beat Feuz
2013	(Norway) Aksel Lund Svindal	(Italy) Matteo Marsaglia	(Austria) Matthias Mayer
2014	(Norway) Aksel Lund Svindal	(Norway) Kjetil Jansrud	(Switzerland) Patrick Küng
2015	(Norway) Kjetil Jansrud	(Italy) Dominik Paris	(Austria) Matthias Mayer
2016	(Norway) Aleksander Aamodt Kilde	(Norway) Kjetil Jansrud	(Norway) Aksel Lund Svindal
2017	(Norway) Kjetil Jansrud	(Austria) Hannes Reichelt	(Norway) Aleksander Aamodt Kilde
2018	(Norway) Kjetil Jansrud	(Austria) Vincent Kriechmayr	(Norway) Aksel Lund Svindal
2019	(Italy) Dominik Paris	(Austria) Vincent Kriechmayr	(Switzerland) Mauro Caviezel
2020	(Switzerland) Mauro Caviezel	(Austria) Vincent Kriechmayr	(Norway) Aleksander Aamodt Kilde
2021	(Austria) Vincent Kriechmayr	(Switzerland) Marco Odermatt	(Austria) Matthias Mayer
2022	(Norway) Aleksander Aamodt Kilde	(Switzerland) Marco Odermatt	(Austria) Vincent Kriechmayr
2023	(Switzerland) Marco Odermatt	(Norway) Aleksander Aamodt Kilde	(Austria) Vincent Kriechmayr
2024	(Switzerland) Marco Odermatt	(Austria) Vincent Kriechmayr	(Austria) Raphael Haaser

Women

Season	1st	2nd	3rd
1986	(Germany) Marina Kiehl	(Canada) Liisa Savijarvi	(Italy) Michaela Marzola
1987	(Switzerland) Maria Walliser	(France) Catherine Quittet	(Germany) Marina Kiehl
1988	(Switzerland) Michela Figini	(Austria) Sylvia Eder	(Germany) Regine Mösenlechner (Spain) Blanca Fernández Ochoa
1989	(France) Carole Merle	(Austria) Sigrid Wolf	(Austria) Anita Wachter
1990	(France) Carole Merle	(Germany) Michaela Gerg-Leitner	(Austria) Sigrid Wolf
1991	(France) Carole Merle	(Austria) Petra Kronberger	(Germany) Michaela Gerg-Leitner
1992	(France) Carole Merle	(Norway) Merete Fjeldavlie	(Germany) Katja Seizinger
1993	(Germany) Katja Seizinger	(Austria) Ulrike Maier	(France) Carole Merle
1994	(Germany) Katja Seizinger	(Italy) Bibiana Perez	(Germany) Hilde Gerg
1995	(Germany) Katja Seizinger	(Switzerland) Heidi Zeller-Bähler	(Switzerland) Heidi Zurbriggen
1996	(Germany) Katja Seizinger	(Austria) Alexandra Meissnitzer	(Germany) Martina Ertl
1997	(Germany) Hilde Gerg	(Germany) Katja Seizinger	(Sweden) Pernilla Wiberg
1998	(Germany) Katja Seizinger	(Austria) Renate Götschl	(Italy) Isolde Kostner
1999	(Austria) Alexandra Meissnitzer	(Austria) Michaela Dorfmeister	(Germany) Martina Ertl
2000	(Austria) Renate Götschl	(Canada) Mélanie Turgeon	(Slovenia) Mojca Suhadolc
2001	(France) Régine Cavagnoud	(Austria) Renate Götschl	(France) Carole Montillet
2002	(Germany) Hilde Gerg	(Austria) Alexandra Meissnitzer	(Austria) Michaela Dorfmeister
2003	(France) Carole Montillet	(Austria) Renate Götschl	(Italy) Karen Putzer
2004	(Austria) Renate Götschl	(France) Carole Montillet	(Austria) Michaela Dorfmeister
2005	(Austria) Michaela Dorfmeister	(Austria) Renate Götschl	(United States) Lindsey Kildow
2006	(Austria) Michaela Dorfmeister	(Austria) Alexandra Meissnitzer	(Switzerland) Nadia Styger
2007	(Austria) Renate Götschl	(Austria) Nicole Hosp	(United States) Lindsey Kildow
2008	(Germany) Maria Riesch	(Austria) Elisabeth Görgl	(Switzerland) Fabienne Suter
2009	(United States) Lindsey Vonn	(Italy) Nadia Fanchini	(Switzerland) Fabienne Suter
2010	(United States) Lindsey Vonn	(Austria) Elisabeth Görgl	(Switzerland) Nadia Styger
2011	(United States) Lindsey Vonn	(Germany) Maria Riesch	(United States) Julia Mancuso
2012	(United States) Lindsey Vonn	(United States) Julia Mancuso	(Austria) Anna Fenninger
2013	(Slovenia) Tina Maze	(United States) Julia Mancuso	(Austria) Anna Fenninger
2014	(Switzerland) Lara Gut	(Austria) Anna Fenninger	(Liechtenstein) Tina Weirather
2015	(United States) Lindsey Vonn	(Austria) Anna Fenninger	(Slovenia) Tina Maze
2016	(Switzerland) Lara Gut	(Liechtenstein) Tina Weirather	(United States) Lindsey Vonn
2017	(Liechtenstein) Tina Weirather	(Slovenia) Ilka Štuhec	(Switzerland) Lara Gut
2018	(Liechtenstein) Tina Weirather	(Switzerland) Lara Gut	(Austria) Anna Veith
2019	(United States) Mikaela Shiffrin	(Austria) Nicole Schmidhofer	(Liechtenstein) Tina Weirather
2020	(Switzerland) Corinne Suter	(Italy) Federica Brignone	(Austria) Nicole Schmidhofer
2021	(Switzerland) Lara Gut-Behrami	(Italy) Federica Brignone	(Switzerland) Corinne Suter
2022	(Italy) Federica Brignone	(Italy) Elena Curtoni	(United States) Mikaela Shiffrin
2023	(Switzerland) Lara Gut-Behrami	(Italy) Federica Brignone	(Norway) Ragnhild Mowinckel
2024	(Switzerland) Lara Gut-Behrami	(Italy) Federica Brignone	(Austria) Cornelia Hütter

=== Super-G at the major competitions ===
Men

Competition	Course setter	1st	2nd	3rd
1987 WCH				
1988 WOG		(France) Franck Piccard	(Austria) Helmut Mayer	(Sweden) Lars-Börje Eriksson
1989 WCH				
1991 WCH				
1992 WOG		(Norway) Kjetil André Aamodt	(Luxembourg) Marc Girardelli	(Norway) Jan Einar Thorsen
1993 WCH				
1994 WOG		(Germany) Markus Wasmeier	(United States) Tommy Moe	(Norway) Kjetil André Aamodt
1996 WCH				
1997 WCH		(Norway) Atle Skårdal	(Norway) Lasse Kjus	(Austria) Günther Mader
1998 WOG		(Austria) Hermann Maier	(Switzerland) Didier Cuche	(Austria) Hans Knauß
1999 WCH		(Norway) Lasse Kjus (Austria) Hermann Maier	None awarded	(Austria) Hans Knauß
2001 WCH		(United States) Daron Rahlves	(Austria) Stephan Eberharter	(Austria) Hermann Maier
2002 WOG	(Switzerland) F. Zueger	(Norway) Kjetil André Aamodt	(Austria) Stephan Eberharter	(Austria) Andreas Schifferer
2003 WCH	(Norway) M. Arnesen	(Austria) Stephan Eberharter	(United States) Bode Miller	(Austria) Hermann Maier
2005 WCH	(Norway) M. Arnesen	(United States) Bode Miller	(Austria) Michael Walchhofer	(Austria) Benjamin Raich
2006 WOG	(Austria) A. Evers	(Norway) Kjetil André Aamodt	(Austria) Hermann Maier	(Switzerland) Ambrosi Hoffmann
2007 WCH	(Switzerland) H. Flatscher	(Italy) Patrick Staudacher	(Austria) Fritz Strobl	(Switzerland) Bruno Kernen
2009 WCH	(Italy) G. L. Rulfi	(Switzerland) Didier Cuche	(Italy) Peter Fill	(Norway) Aksel Lund Svindal
2010 WOG	(Italy) G. L. Rulfi	(Norway) Aksel Lund Svindal	(United States) Bode Miller	(United States) Andrew Weibrecht
2011 WCH	(Switzerland) H. Flatscher	(Italy) Christof Innerhofer	(Austria) Hannes Reichelt	(Croatia) Ivica Kostelić
2013 WCH	(Norway) T. Moger	(United States) Ted Ligety	(France) Gauthier de Tessières	(Norway) Aksel Lund Svindal
2014 WOG	(France) P. Morisod	(Norway) Kjetil Jansrud	(United States) Andrew Weibrecht	(United States) Bode Miller
2015 WCH	(Austria) F. Winkler	(Austria) Hannes Reichelt	(Canada) Dustin Cook	(France) Adrien Théaux
2017 WCH	(Italy) A. Ghidoni	(Canada) Erik Guay	(Norway) Kjetil Jansrud	(Canada) Manuel Osborne-Paradis
2018 WOG	(Italy) A. Ghidoni	(Austria) Matthias Mayer	(Switzerland) Beat Feuz	(Norway) Kjetil Jansrud
2019 WCH		(Italy) Dominik Paris	(France) Johan Clarey (Austria) Vincent Kriechmayr	None awarded
2021 WCH		(Austria) Vincent Kriechmayr	(Germany) Romed Baumann	(France) Alexis Pinturault
2022 WOG		(Austria) Matthias Mayer	(United States) Ryan Cochran-Siegle	(Norway) Aleksander Aamodt Kilde
2023 WCH		(Canada) James Crawford	(Norway) Aleksander Aamodt Kilde	(France) Alexis Pinturault
2025 WCH		(Switzerland) Marco Odermatt	(Switzerland) Raphael Haaser	(Norway) Adrian Smiseth Sejersted
2026 WOG		(Switzerland) Franjo von Allmen	(United States) Ryan Cochran-Siegle	(Switzerland) Marco Odermatt

Women

Competition	Course setter	1st	2nd	3rd
1987 WCH				
1988 WOG		(Austria) Sigrid Wolf	(Switzerland) Michela Figini	(Canada) Karen Percy
1989 WCH				
1991 WCH				
1992 WOG		(Italy) Deborah Compagnoni	(France) Carole Merle	(Germany) Katja Seizinger
1993 WCH				
1994 WOG		(United States) Diann Roffe Steinrotter	(Russia) Svetlana Gladysheva	(Italy) Isolde Kostner
1996 WCH				
1997 WCH		(Italy) Isolde Kostner	(Germany) Katja Seizinger	(Germany) Hilde Gerg
1998 WOG		(United States) Picabo Street	(Austria) Michaela Dorfmeister	(Austria) Alexandra Meissnitzer
1999 WCH		(Austria) Alexandra Meissnitzer	(Austria) Renate Götschl	(Austria) Michaela Dorfmeister
2001 WCH		(France) Régine Cavagnoud	(Italy) Isolde Kostner	(Germany) Hilde Gerg
2002 WOG	(Sweden) P. Endrass	(Italy) Daniela Ceccarelli	(Croatia) Janica Kostelić	(Italy) Karen Putzer
2003 WCH	(Austria) B. Zobel	(Austria) Michaela Dorfmeister	(United States) Kristen Clark	(United States) Jonna Mendes
2005 WCH	(France) X. Fournier	(Sweden) Anja Pärson	(Italy) Lucia Recchia	(United States) Julia Mancuso
2006 WOG	(Austria) J. Graller	(Austria) Michaela Dorfmeister	(Croatia) Janica Kostelić	(Austria) Alexandra Meissnitzer
2007 WCH	(Austria) J. Graller	(Sweden) Anja Pärson	(United States) Lindsey Vonn	(Austria) Renate Götschl
2009 WCH	(Sweden) U. Emilsson	(United States) Lindsey Vonn	(France) Marie Marchand-Arvier	(Austria) Andrea Fischbacher
2010 WOG	(Austria) J. Kriechbaum	(Austria) Andrea Fischbacher	(Slovenia) Tina Maze	(United States) Lindsey Vonn
2011 WCH	(Austria) J. Kriechbaum	(Austria) Elisabeth Görgl	(United States) Julia Mancuso	(Germany) Maria Riesch
2013 WCH	(Switzerland) D. Petrini	(Slovenia) Tina Maze	(Switzerland) Lara Gut	(United States) Julia Mancuso
2014 WOG	(Austria) F. Winkler	(Austria) Anna Fenninger	(Germany) Maria Höfl-Riesch	(Austria) Nicole Hosp
2015 WCH	(Austria) R. Assinger	(Austria) Anna Fenninger	(Slovenia) Tina Maze	(United States) Lindsey Vonn
2017 WCH	(Italy) A. Ghezze	(Austria) Nicole Schmidhofer	(Liechtenstein) Tina Weirather	(Switzerland) Lara Gut
2018 WOG	(Austria) M. Tatschl	(Czech Republic) Ester Ledecká	(Austria) Anna Veith	(Liechtenstein) Tina Weirather
2019 WCH		(United States) Mikaela Shiffrin	(Italy) Sofia Goggia	(Switzerland) Corinne Suter
2021 WCH		(Switzerland) Lara Gut-Behrami	(Switzerland) Corinne Suter	(United States) Mikaela Shiffrin
2022 WOG		(Switzerland) Lara Gut-Behrami	(Austria) Mirjam Puchner	(Switzerland) Michelle Gisin
2023 WCH		(Italy) Marta Bassino	(United States) Mikaela Shiffrin	(Austria) Cornelia Hütter (Norway) Kajsa Vickhoff Lie
2025 WCH		(Austria) Stephanie Venier	(Italy) Federica Brignone	(United States) Lauren Macuga (Norway) Kajsa Vickhoff Lie
2026 WOG				

WOG - Winter Olympic Games, WCH - FIS World Ski Championships

== See also ==
- Alpine skiing combined
- Downhill
- Giant slalom
- Slalom
- Skiing and skiing topics
- List of Olympic medalists in men's super-G
- List of Olympic medalists in women's super-G
- List of Paralympic medalists in men's super-G
- List of Paralympic medalists in women's super-G
- List of world champions in super-G
