= Hilde Gerg =

German alpine skier

Personal information
- Born: 19 October 1975 (age 50) Lenggries, Bavaria, West Germany
- Height: 171 cm (5 ft 7 in)
- Website: hilde-gerg.de

Skiing career
- Sport: Alpine skiing
- Club: Ski Club Lenggries
- Retired: 21 November 2005 (age 30)
- Disciplines: Downhill, super-G, giant slalom, slalom, combined
- World Cup debut: 17 January 1993 (age 17)

Olympics
- Teams: 3 – (1994-2002)
- Medals: 2 (1 gold)

World Championships
- Teams: 6 – (1996-2005)
- Medals: 4 (1 gold)

World Cup
- Seasons: 13 – (1993–2005)
- Wins: 20 – (7 DH, 1 SL, 8 SG, 3 SC, 1 PS)
- Podiums: 59
- Overall titles: 0 – (2nd in 1999)
- Discipline titles: 4 – (2 SG, 2 SC)
Medal record
Women's alpine skiing
Representing Germany
World Cup race podiums
| Event | 1st | 2nd | 3rd |
|---|---|---|---|
| Slalom | 1 | 3 | 1 |
| Giant slalom | 0 | 0 | 1 |
| Downhill | 7 | 6 | 10 |
| Super-G | 8 | 5 | 9 |
| Combined | 3 | 2 | 1 |
| Parallel | 1 | 0 | 0 |
| Total | 20 | 16 | 22 |
International competitions
| Event | 1st | 2nd | 3rd |
|---|---|---|---|
| Olympic Games | 1 | 0 | 1 |
| World Championships | 1 | 0 | 3 |
| World Junior Championships | 1 | 0 | 0 |
| Total | 3 | 0 | 4 |
Olympic Games
| Gold medal – first place | 1998 Nagano | Slalom |
| Bronze medal – third place | 1998 Nagano | Combined |
World Championships
| Gold medal – first place | 2005 Bormio | Team Event |
| Bronze medal – third place | 1997 Sestriere | Super-G |
| Bronze medal – third place | 1997 Sestriere | Combined |
| Bronze medal – third place | 2001 Sankt Anton | Super-G |
Junior World Ski Championships
| Gold medal – first place | 1994 Lake Placid | Super-G |

Mathilde Gerg (born 19 October 1975) is a German former alpine skier. She was an Olympic and World champion.

== Career ==
She was Olympic Champion in the slalom at the 1998 Winter Olympics, an astounding win as most of her career she was known as predominantly a speed specialist; with 1998 being the one year of her career she was a top slalom contender with 2 wins and numerous podiums on the World Cup, finishing 3rd in points for the season. At the World Championships she was bronze medallist in Combined and Super-G at Sestriere 1997, Bronze medallist in Super-G at St. Anton 2001, and gold medallist in Nation Team Event at Bormio in 2005.

In 1994, Gerg was Junior World Champion and in 1997 and 2002 she won the World Cup in her favorite discipline, Super-G. Her 1997 Super G season title came due to decisive points' leader Pernilla Wiberg going off course in the final Super G of the season. She also has twice won the combined season Crystal Globe, and twice narrowly missed the downhill season title, finishing 2nd in the points in both 2004 and 2005. She was 2nd in the Overall title standings in 1999, losing the Overall title to Alexandra Meissnitzer.

Gerg retired from professional skiing, because of severe injuries, in November 2005.

Her cousin, Annemarie Gerg, was also a member of the German alpine ski team.

== World Cup results ==
=== Season standings ===
| Season | Age | Overall | Slalom | Giant slalom | Super G | Downhill | Combined |
|---|---|---|---|---|---|---|---|
| 1993 | 17 | 106 | 48 | – | – | – | — |
| 1994 | 18 | 18 | 39 | 29 | 3 | 48 | 15 |
| 1995 | 19 | 37 | 43 | 34 | 17 | 45 | 8 |
| 1996 | 20 | 15 | 24 | 17 | 11 | 22 | 3 |
| 1997 | 21 | 3 | 15 | 9 | 1 | 7 | 2 |
| 1998 | 22 | 3 | 3 | 9 | 7 | 5 | 1 |
| 1999 | 23 | 2 | 17 | 14 | 6 | 4 | 1 |
| 2000 | 24 | 26 | 37 | 57 | 10 | 14 | — |
| 2001 | 25 | 32 | – | – | 28 | 11 | 11 |
| 2002 | 26 | 4 | – | 41 | 1 | 4 | 9 |
| 2003 | 27 | 14 | – | 39 | 7 | 8 | — |
| 2004 | 28 | 4 | – | 35 | 4 | 2 | — |
| 2005 | 29 | 7 | – | – | 5 | 2 | 23 |

=== Season titles ===
| Season | Discipline |
|---|---|
| 1997 | Super-G |
| 1998 | Combined |
| 1999 | Combined |
| 2002 | Super-G |

=== Race victories ===
- 20 wins – (7 DH, 1 SL, 8 SG, 3 SC, 1 Parallel slalom)

| Season | Date | Location | Race |
|---|---|---|---|
| 1994 | 6 February 1994 | Sierra Nevada, Spain | Super-G |
| 1997 | 12 December 1996 | Val-d'Isère, France | Super-G |
| 1998 | 28 November 1997 | Mammoth Mountain, USA | Parallel slalom |
| 1998 | 20 December 1997 | Val-d'Isère, France | Combined |
| 1998 | 11 January 1998 | Bormio, Italy | Slalom |
| 1998 | 31 January 1998 | Åre, Sweden | Combined |
| 1999 | 18 December 1998 | Veysonnaz, Switzerland | Downhill |
| 1999 | 20 December 1998 | Veysonnaz, Switzerland | Combined |
| 1999 | 2 January 1999 | Maribor, Slovenia | Super-G |
| 2001 | 8 March 2001 | Åre, Sweden | Downhill |
| 2002 | 15 December 2001 | Val-d'Isère, France | Super-G |
| 2002 | 11 January 2002 | Saalbach-Hinterglemm, Austria | Downhill |
| 2002 | 12 January 2002 | Saalbach-Hinterglemm, Austria | Downhill |
| 2002 | 25 January 2002 | Cortina d'Ampezzo, Italy | Super-G |
| 2003 | 29 November 2002 | Aspen, USA | Super-G |
| 2003 | 6 December 2002 | Lake Louise, Canada | Downhill |
| 2004 | 7 January 2004 | Cortina d'Ampezzo, Italy | Downhill |
| 2004 | 11 January 2004 | Veysonnaz, Switzerland | Super-G |
| 2005 | 4 December 2004 | Lake Louise, Canada | Downhill |
| 2005 | 21 December 2004 | St. Moritz, Switzerland | Super-G |

== See also ==
- List of FIS Alpine Ski World Cup women's race winners
