= Annemarie Gerg =

German alpine skier (born 1975)

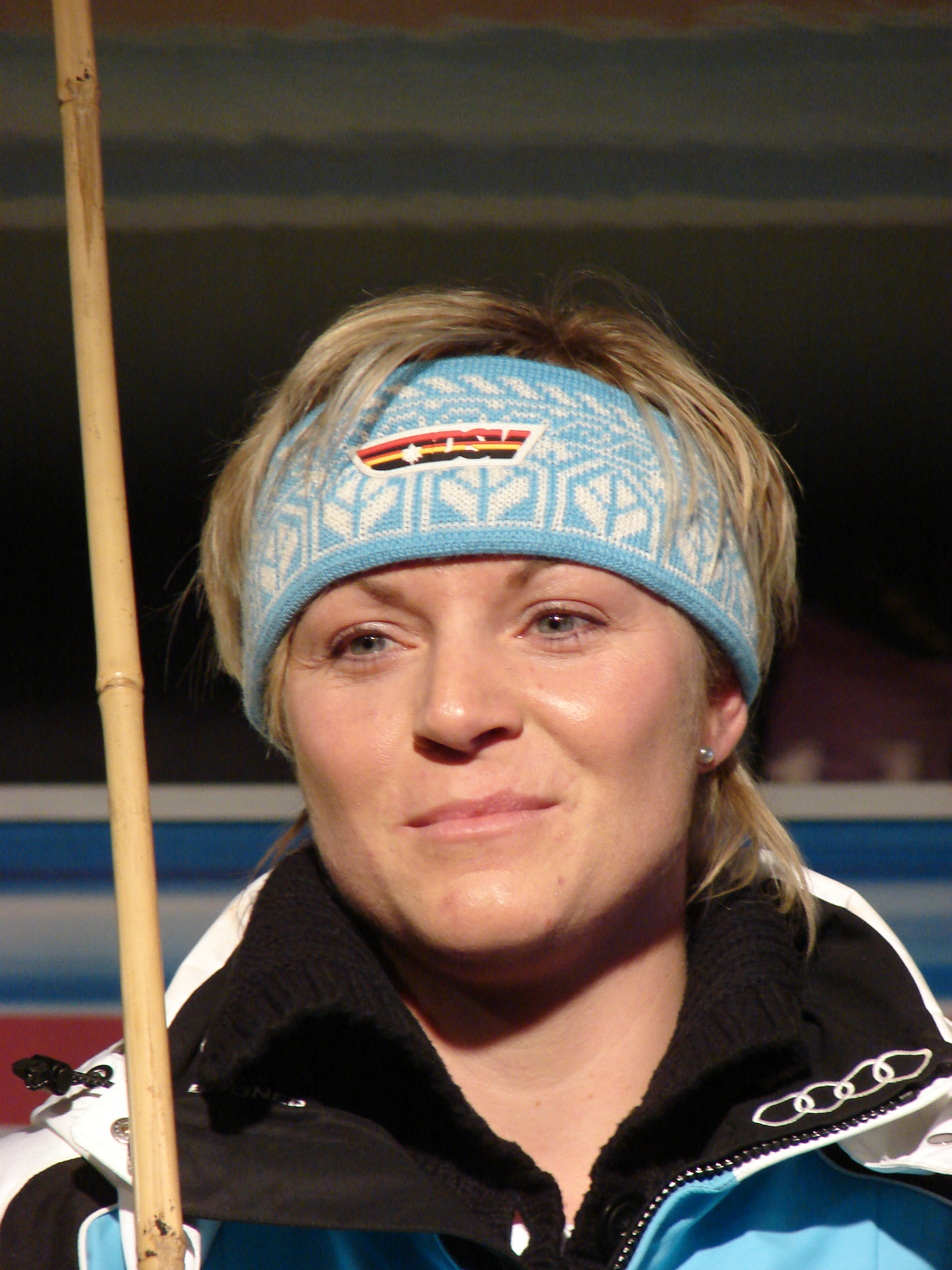
Annemarie Gerg in 2002

Annemarie Gerg (born 14 June 1975) is a German former alpine skier who competed in the 2002 Winter Olympics and 2006 Winter Olympics. She is a cousin of fellow alpine skier and former Olympic and World Champion Hilde Gerg.
