= Alexandra Meissnitzer =

Austrian alpine skier (born 1973)

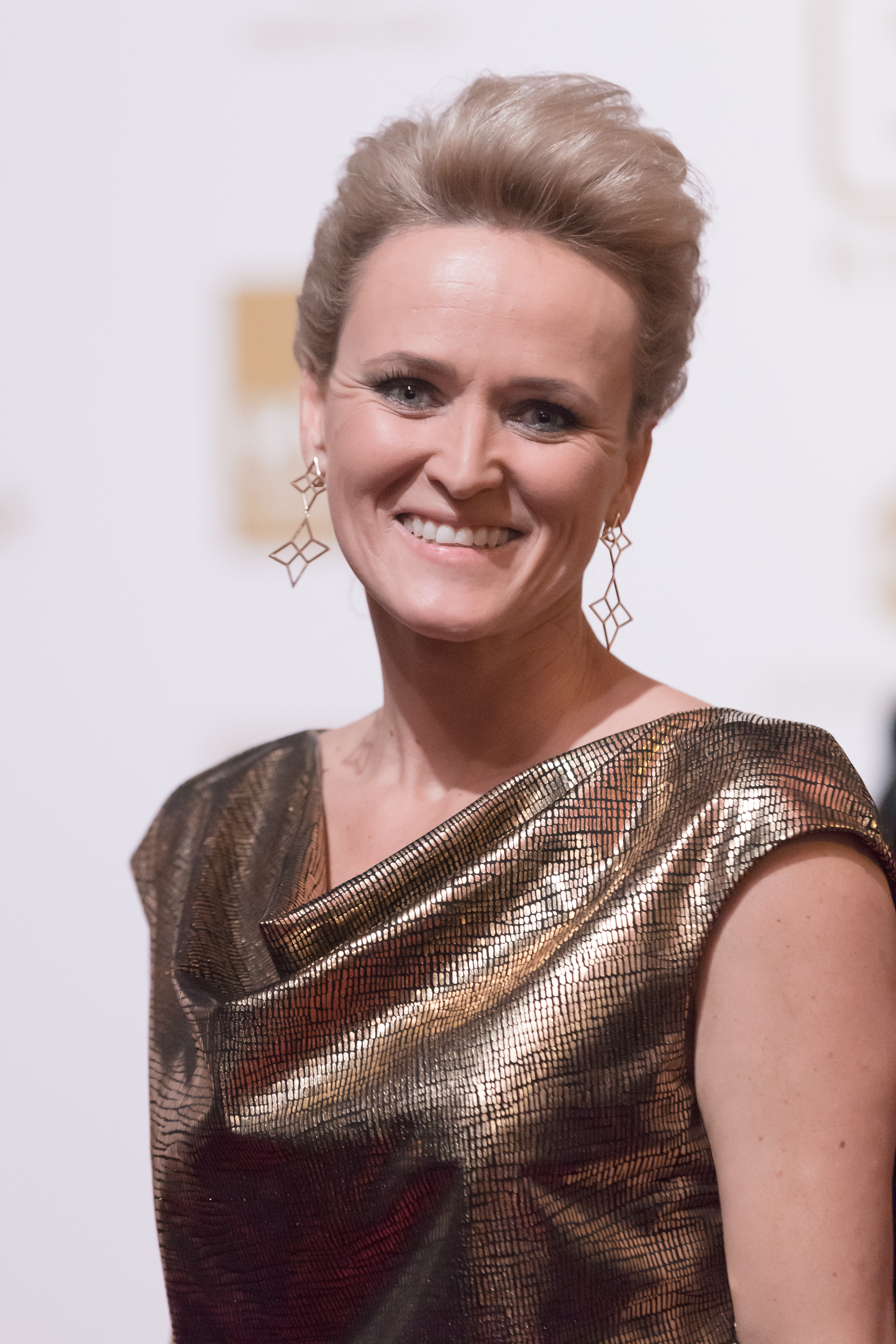
- November 2017

Personal information
- Born: 18 June 1973 (age 53) Abtenau, Salzburg, Austria
- Height: 1.65 m (5 ft 5 in)

Skiing career
- Sport: Alpine skiing
- Club: S.A. Abtenau
- Retired: March 2008 (age 34)
- Disciplines: Downhill, super-G, giant slalom
- World Cup debut: 7 December 1991 (age 18)

Olympics
- Teams: 3 – (1998, 2002, 2006)
- Medals: 3 (0 gold)

World Championships
- Teams: 7 – (1996–2007)
- Medals: 3 (2 gold)

World Cup
- Seasons: 17 – (1992–2008)
- Wins: 14 – (2 DH, 7 SG, 5 GS)
- Podiums: 44
- Overall titles: 1 – (1999)
- Discipline titles: 2 – (SG, GS; 1999)
Medal record
Women's alpine skiing
Representing Austria
International alpine ski competitions
Event	1st	2nd	3rd
Olympic Games	0	1	2
World Championships	2	1	0
Total	2	2	2
World Cup race podiums
Event	1st	2nd	3rd
Giant	5	5	6
Super-G	7	7	4
Downhill	2	1	5
Parallel	0	0	2
Total	14	13	17
Olympic Games
Silver medal – second place	1998 Nagano	Giant slalom
Bronze medal – third place	1998 Nagano	Super-G
Bronze medal – third place	2006 Turin	Super-G
World Championships
Gold medal – first place	1999 Vail	Giant slalom
Gold medal – first place	1999 Vail	Super-G
Silver medal – second place	2003 St. Moritz	Downhill

Alexandra Meissnitzer (born 18 June 1973) is a retired World Cup alpine ski racer from Austria. Her specialities were the downhill, super-G, and giant slalom disciplines.

From Abtenau, Salzburg, her father, Hans Meissnitzer, a mechanic by trade, taught her to ski at an early age.

At the 1998 Winter Olympics at Nagano, Meissnitzer won the silver in the giant-slalom and the bronze in the super-G, and at the 2006 Winter Olympics at Turin she won the bronze in the super-G. In 1999, she won the overall World Cup, to which she added the super-G and giant slalom World Cups for the same season. She also won two world titles (super-G and giant slalom) at the 1999 World Championships. A serious training crash in November 1999, she missed the remainder of the season. At the 2003 World Championships, she won the silver medal in the downhill race (in a tie with Corinne Rey-Bellet) behind Melanie Turgeon.

Meissnitzer was third in the super-G at the 2008 World Cup finals in Bormio, Italy, and became the oldest woman (age 34) to finish on the podium in an alpine World Cup race.

== World Cup results ==
=== Season titles ===
Season	Discipline
1999	Overall
1999	Giant slalom
1999	Super-G

=== Season standings ===
Season	Age	Overall	Slalom	Giant Slalom	Super-G	Downhill	Combined
1992	18	98	—	48	45	—	—
1993	19	89	—	—	54	35	—
1994	20	76	—	46	38	42	—
1995	21	23	—	29	10	21	—
1996	22	5	—	9	2	6	—
1997	23	19	—	24	17	12	—
1998	24	5	—	3	11	8	24
1999	25	1	44	1	1	2	5
2000	26	105	—	51	—	—	—
2001	27	16	—	13	12	21	—
2002	28	15	—	12	2	43	20
2003	29	8	—	7	4	10	—
2004	30	8	—	7	7	10	—
2005	31	16	—	27	6	21	—
2006	32	9	—	26	2	6	—
2007	33	17	—	34	5	15	—
2008	34	26	—	36	9	28	—

=== Race victories ===
- 14 wins – (2 DH, 7 SG, 5 GS)
- 44 podiums – (8 DH, 18 SG, 16 GS, 2 PS)

Date	Location	Discipline
7 December 1995	(France) Val-d'Isère	Super-G
20 December 1995	(Switzerland) Veysonnaz	Super-G
15 March 1998	(Switzerland) Crans-Montana	Giant slalom
19 November 1998	(United States) Park City	Giant slalom
29 November 1998	(United States) Lake Louise	Super-G
10 December 1998	(France) Val-d'Isère	Super-G
11 December 1998	(France) Val-d'Isère	Giant slalom
19 December 1998	(Switzerland) Veysonnaz	Downhill
24 January 1999	(Italy) Cortina d'Ampezzo	Giant slalom
22 February 1999	(Sweden) Åre	Giant slalom
10 March 1999	(Spain) Sierra Nevada	Downhill
4 January 2004	(France) Megève	Super-G
11 December 2004	(Austria) Altenmarkt	Super-G
4 December 2005	(Canada) Lake Louise	Super-G

== World Championship results ==
Year	Age	Slalom	Giant Slalom	Super-G	Downhill	Combined
1996	22	—	DNS2	23	16	—
1997	23	—	—	13	17	—
1999	25	—	1	1	4	—
2001	27	—	DNF2	8	11	—
2003	29	—	DNF1	5	2	—
2005	31	—	—	DNF	22	—
2007	33	—	—	8	—	—

== Olympic results ==
Year	Age	Slalom	Giant Slalom	Super-G	Downhill	Combined
1998	24	—	2	3	8	—
2002	28	—	4	4	—	—
2006	32	—	—	3	8	—

Awards
Preceded by (Austria) Renate Götschl	Austrian Sportswoman of the year 1998 – 1999	Succeeded by (Austria) Stephanie Graf
