= Sabine Egger =

Austrian alpine skier (born 1977)

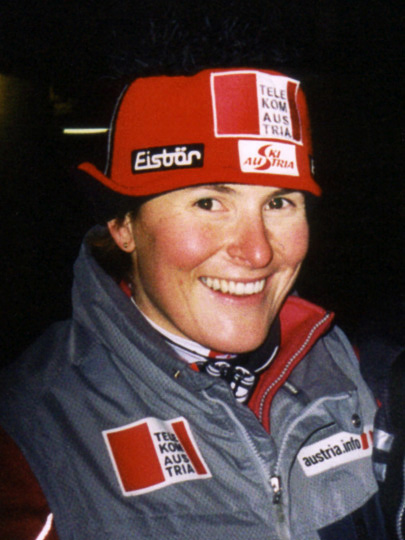
Sabine Egger in 2002

Sabine Egger (born 22 April 1977, in Klagenfurt) is an Austrian former alpine skier who competed in the 1998 Winter Olympics.
