= Renate Götschl =

Austrian alpine skier

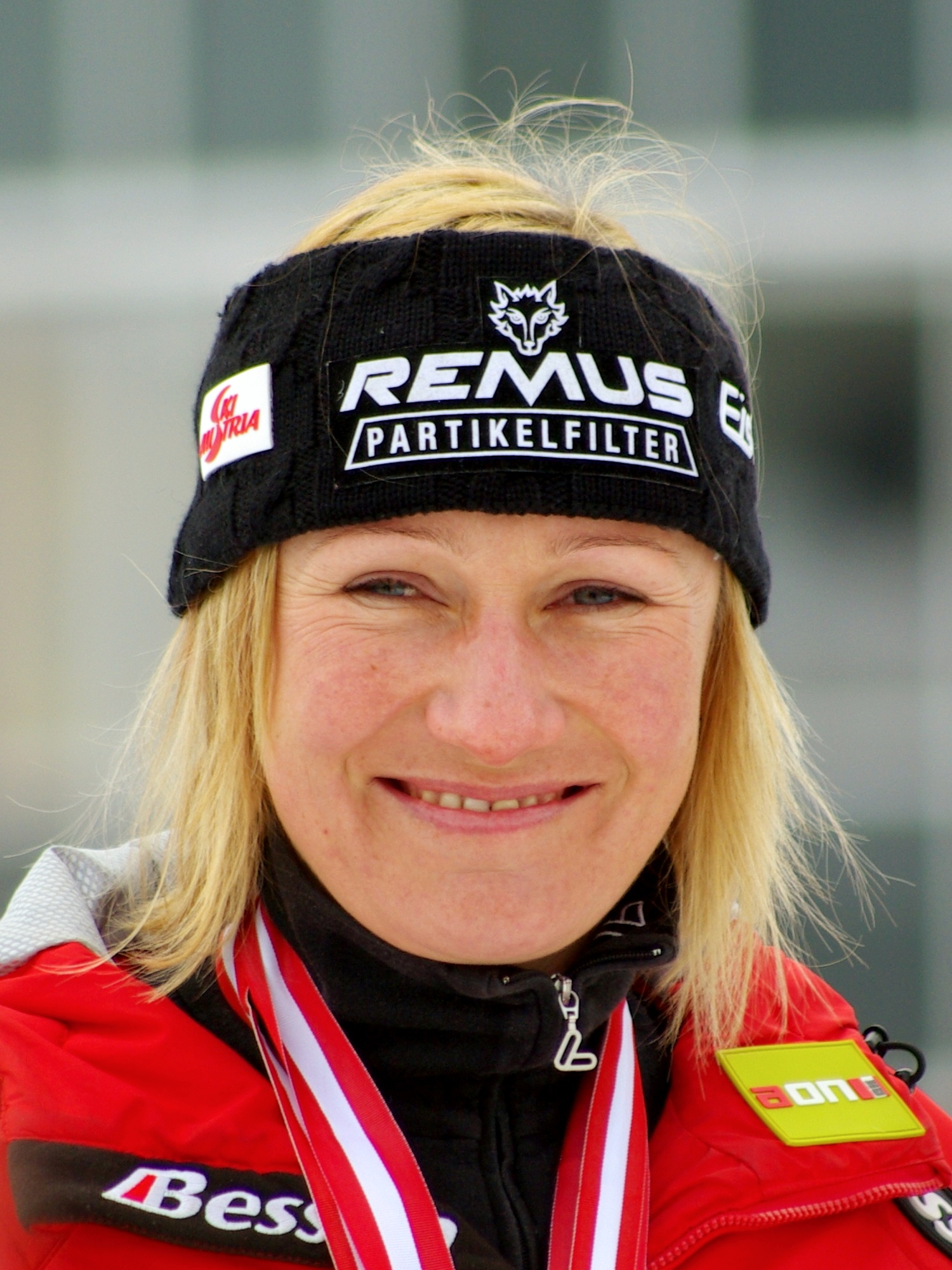
- Renate Götschl during the Austrian Alpine Skiing Championships in Haus im Ennstal in March 2008

Personal information
- Born: 6 August 1975 (age 50) Judenburg, Austria
- Height: 164 cm (5 ft 5 in)

Skiing career
- Sport: Alpine skiing
- Club: SC Weißkirchen
- Retired: August 2009 (age 34)
- Disciplines: Downhill, super-G, giant slalom, slalom, combined
- World Cup debut: January 1993 (age 17)

Olympics
- Teams: 4 – (1994, 1998, 2002, 2006)
- Medals: 2 (0 gold)

World Championships
- Teams: 8 – (1996–09)
- Medals: 9 (3 gold)

World Cup
- Seasons: 17 – 1993–2009)
- Wins: 46
- Podiums: 110
- Overall titles: 1 – (2000)
- Discipline titles: 10 – (5 DH, 3 SG, 2 KB)
Medal record
Women's alpine skiing
Representing Austria
World Cup
Event	1st	2nd	3rd
Downhill	24	21	14
Super G	17	15	9
Giant slalom	0	1	3
Slalom	1	0	0
Combined	4	0	1
Total	46	37	27
International alpine ski competitions
Event	1st	2nd	3rd
Olympic Games	0	1	1
World Championships	3	4	2
Total	3	5	3
Olympic Games
Silver medal – second place	2002 Salt Lake City	Combined
Bronze medal – third place	2002 Salt Lake City	Downhill
World Championships
Gold medal – first place	1997 Sestriere	Combined
Gold medal – first place	1999 Vail	Downhill
Gold medal – first place	2007 Åre	Team event
Silver medal – second place	1999 Vail	Combined
Silver medal – second place	1999 Vail	Super-G
Silver medal – second place	2001 St. Anton	Downhill
Silver medal – second place	2005 Bormio	Team event
Bronze medal – third place	2005 Bormio	Downhill
Bronze medal – third place	2007 Åre	Super-G
Junior World Ski Championships
Bronze medal – third place	1993 Monte Campione	Slalom

Renate Götschl (born 6 August 1975) is an Austrian former alpine ski racer. She is a two-time individual World Champion in the combined (1997) and downhill (1999), and has won a total of 9 World Championships medals. She also won two Olympic medals in 2002, the bronze medal in downhill and the silver medal in the combined.

== Career ==
Götschl made her World Cup debut in 1993, on 14 March 1993, winning the slalom in Lillehammer, Norway. This was followed by more than 100 podium (top 3) results, including at least one win in four of the five disciplines; only a giant slalom win has eluded her, the best result in this discipline being a second place in Lienz in December 2003.

She won the overall World Cup title in 2000, and she has also won five World Cup discipline titles in downhill (1997, 1999, 2004, 2005 and 2007), three in super-G (2000, 2004 and 2007), and two in combined (2000 and 2002).

Götschl has won nine medals at the World Championships, including gold medals in combined (1997) in downhill (1999) and in team event (2007). At the 2002 Winter Olympics, she won a silver medal in combined and a bronze medal in the downhill.

On 28 January 2007, when she was second in a super-G in San Sicario, she celebrated her 100th podium in World Cup. Her total of 46 World Cup race wins (as of 14 March 2007) is fifth all-time among women, behind only Lindsey Vonn, Mikaela Shiffrin, Annemarie Moser-Pröll, and Vreni Schneider. One of her favorite slopes is in Cortina d'Ampezzo, Italy, where on 20 January 2007 she became the first alpine skier ever to win 10 races at a single World Cup venue. This highscore was held until December 2011 when Lindsey Vonn celebrated her ninth, tenth and eleventh victory on three consecutive days in Lake Louise, Canada.

== World Cup statistics ==
=== Race wins ===
- 46 wins (24 DH / 17 SG / 1 SL / 4 KB)

==== Downhill ====
Date	Location
7 December 1996	Vail
18 January 1998	Altenmarkt
27 November 1998	Lake Louise
28 November 1998	Lake Louise
27 February 1999	Åre
5 March 1999	St. Moritz
19 February 2000	Åre
25 February 2000	Innsbruck
17 December 2000	St. Moritz
13 January 2001	Haus
26 January 2002	Cortina d'Ampezzo
2 February 2002	Åre
18 January 2003	Cortina d'Ampezzo
12 March 2003	Lillehammer Hafjell
20 December 2003	St. Moritz
10 January 2004	Veysonnaz
10 March 2004	Sestriere
15 January 2005	Cortina d'Ampezzo
10 March 2005	Lenzerheide
28 January 2006	Cortina d'Ampezzo
13 January 2007	Altenmarkt
20 January 2007	Cortina d'Ampezzo
27 January 2007	San Sicario
14 March 2007	Lenzerheide

==== Super-G ====
Date	Location
10 January 1995	Flachau
22 January 1999	Cortina d'Ampezzo
16 January 2000	Altenmarkt
27 February 2000	Innsbruck
16 March 2000	Bormio
2 December 2000	Lake Louise
17 January 2003	Cortina d'Ampezzo
28 February 2003	Innsbruck
7 December 2003	Lake Louise
16 January 2004	Cortina d'Ampezzo
21 February 2004	Åre
12 January 2005	Cortina d'Ampezzo
14 January 2005	Cortina d'Ampezzo
3 December 2006	Lake Louise
16 December 2006	Reiteralm
26 January 2007	San Sicario
4 March 2007	Tarvisio

==== Slalom ====
Date	Location
14 March 1993	Lillehammer Hafjell

==== Combined ====
Date	Location
19 December 1993	St. Anton
12 February 2000	Santa Caterina
13 January 2002	Saalbach-Hinterglemm
3 February 2002	Åre

=== Individual races ===
- 46 wins (24 DH / 17 SG / 1 SL / 4 KB)
- 110 podiums (59 DH / 41 SG / 4 GS / 1 SL / 5 KB)

Regarding the most podium positions, Götschl ranks third to Annemarie Moser-Pröll, who leads with 113 and Lindsey Vonn.

Season	Date	Location	Discipline	Place
1992/1993; 1 victory (1 SL)	14 Mar 1993	Hafjell, Norway	Slalom	1st
1993/1994; 1 victory (1 KB); 2 podiums	18 Dec 1993	St. Anton, Austria	Downhill	2nd
1993/1994; 1 victory (1 KB); 2 podiums	19 Dec 1993	St. Anton, Austria	Combined	1st
1994/1995; 1 victory (1 SG); 3 podiums	10 Jan 1995	Flachau, Austria	Super-G	1st
1994/1995; 1 victory (1 SG); 3 podiums	11 Mar 1995	Lenzerheide, Switzerland	Downhill	3rd
1994/1995; 1 victory (1 SG); 3 podiums	19 Mar 1995	Bormio, Italy	Super-G	2nd
1995/1996; 4 podiums	16 Dec 1995	St. Anton, Austria	Downhill	3rd
1995/1996; 4 podiums	20 Jan 1996	Cortina d'Ampezzo, Italy	Downhill	3rd
1995/1996; 4 podiums	2 Feb 1996	Val-d'Isère, France	Super-G	2nd
1995/1996; 4 podiums	4 Feb 1996	Val-d'Isère, France	Super-G	3rd
1996/1997; 1 victory (1 DH); 4 podiums	7 Dec 1996	Vail, CO, United States	Downhill	1st
1996/1997; 1 victory (1 DH); 4 podiums	1 Feb 1997	Laax, Switzerland	Downhill	2nd
1996/1997; 1 victory (1 DH); 4 podiums	2 Mar 1997	Happo One, Japan	Downhill	3rd
1996/1997; 1 victory (1 DH); 4 podiums	12 Mar 1997	Vail, CO, United States	Downhill	2nd
1997/1998; 1 victory (1 DH); 6 podiums	4 Dec 1997	Lake Louise, Alberta, Canada	Downhill	3rd
1997/1998; 1 victory (1 DH); 6 podiums	18 Dec 1997	Val-d'Isère, France	Super-G	2nd
1997/1998; 1 victory (1 DH); 6 podiums	18 Jan 1998	Altenmarkt-Zauchensee, Austria	Downhill	1st
1997/1998; 1 victory (1 DH); 6 podiums	22 Jan 1998	Cortina d'Ampezzo, Italy	Downhill	2nd
1997/1998; 1 victory (1 DH); 6 podiums	24 Jan 1996	Cortina d'Ampezzo, Italy	Super-G	2nd
1997/1998; 1 victory (1 DH); 6 podiums	18 Dec 1997	Åre, Sweden	Downhill	2nd
1998/1999; 5 victories (4 DH, 1 SG); 8 podiums	27 Nov 1998	Lake Louise, Alberta, Canada	Downhill	1st
1998/1999; 5 victories (4 DH, 1 SG); 8 podiums	28 Nov 1998	Lake Louise, Alberta, Canada	Downhill	1st
1998/1999; 5 victories (4 DH, 1 SG); 8 podiums	4 Dec 1998	Mammoth Mountain, CA, United States	Super-G	2nd
1998/1999; 5 victories (4 DH, 1 SG); 8 podiums	19 Dec 1998	Veysonnaz, Switzerland	Downhill	3rd
1998/1999; 5 victories (4 DH, 1 SG); 8 podiums	22 Jan 1999	Cortina d'Ampezzo, Italy	Super-G	1st
1998/1999; 5 victories (4 DH, 1 SG); 8 podiums	27 Feb 1999	Åre, Sweden	Downhill	1st
1998/1999; 5 victories (4 DH, 1 SG); 8 podiums	5 Mar 1999	St. Moritz, Switzerland	Downhill	1st
1998/1999; 5 victories (4 DH, 1 SG); 8 podiums	6 Mar 1999	St. Moritz, Switzerland	Super-G	2nd
1999/2000; 6 victories (2 DH, 3 SG, 1 KB); 11 podiums	18 Dec 1999	St. Moritz, Switzerland	Downhill	2nd
1999/2000; 6 victories (2 DH, 3 SG, 1 KB); 11 podiums	16 Jan 2000	Altenmarkt-Zauchensee, Austria	Super-G	1st
1999/2000; 6 victories (2 DH, 3 SG, 1 KB); 11 podiums	11 Feb 2000	Santa Caterina, Italy	Super-G	3rd
1999/2000; 6 victories (2 DH, 3 SG, 1 KB); 11 podiums	12 Feb 2000	Santa Caterina, Italy	Combined	1st
1999/2000; 6 victories (2 DH, 3 SG, 1 KB); 11 podiums	19 Feb 2000	Åre, Sweden	Downhill	1st
1999/2000; 6 victories (2 DH, 3 SG, 1 KB); 11 podiums	25 Feb 2000	Innsbruck, Austria	Downhill	1st
1999/2000; 6 victories (2 DH, 3 SG, 1 KB); 11 podiums	26 Feb 2000	Innsbruck, Austria	Super-G	2nd
1999/2000; 6 victories (2 DH, 3 SG, 1 KB); 11 podiums	27 Feb 2000	Innsbruck, Austria	Super-G	1st
1999/2000; 6 victories (2 DH, 3 SG, 1 KB); 11 podiums	5 Mar 2000	Lenzerheide, Switzerland	Downhill	3rd
1999/2000; 6 victories (2 DH, 3 SG, 1 KB); 11 podiums	15 Mar 2000	Bormio, Italy	Downhill	3rd
1999/2000; 6 victories (2 DH, 3 SG, 1 KB); 11 podiums	16 Mar 2000	Bormio, Italy	Super-G	1st
2000/2001; 3 victories (2 DH, 1 SG); 13 podiums	30 Nov 2000	Lake Louise, Alberta, Canada	Downhill	3rd
2000/2001; 3 victories (2 DH, 1 SG); 13 podiums	2 Dec 2000	Lake Louise, Alberta, Canada	Super-G	1st
2000/2001; 3 victories (2 DH, 1 SG); 13 podiums	16 Dec 2000	St. Moritz, Switzerland	Downhill	2nd
2000/2001; 3 victories (2 DH, 1 SG); 13 podiums	17 Dec 2000	St. Moritz, Switzerland	Downhill	1st
2000/2001; 3 victories (2 DH, 1 SG); 13 podiums	19 Dec 2000	Sestriere, Italy	Giant slalom	3rd
2000/2001; 3 victories (2 DH, 1 SG); 13 podiums	6 Jan 2001	Maribor, Slovenia	Giant slalom	3rd
2000/2001; 3 victories (2 DH, 1 SG); 13 podiums	13 Jan 2001	Haus im Ennstal, Austria	Super-G	3rd
2000/2001; 3 victories (2 DH, 1 SG); 13 podiums	13 Jan 2001	Haus im Ennstal, Austria	Downhill	1st
2000/2001; 3 victories (2 DH, 1 SG); 13 podiums	14 Jan 2001	Flachau, Austria	Combined	3rd
2000/2001; 3 victories (2 DH, 1 SG); 13 podiums	19 Jan 2001	Cortina d'Ampezzo, Italy	Downhill	2nd
2000/2001; 3 victories (2 DH, 1 SG); 13 podiums	20 Jan 2001	Cortina d'Ampezzo, Italy	Super-G	3rd
2000/2001; 3 victories (2 DH, 1 SG); 13 podiums	16 Feb 2001	Garmisch-Partenkirchen, Germany	Super-G	2nd
2000/2001; 3 victories (2 DH, 1 SG); 13 podiums	25 Feb 2001	Lenzerheide, Switzerland	Super-G	2nd
2001/2002; 4 victories (2 DH, 2 KB); 7 podiums	15 Dec 2001	Val-d'Isère, France	Super-G	2nd
2001/2002; 4 victories (2 DH, 2 KB); 7 podiums	12 Jan 2002	Saalbach-Hinterglemm, Austria	Downhill	2nd
2001/2002; 4 victories (2 DH, 2 KB); 7 podiums	13 Jan 2002	Saalbach-Hinterglemm, Austria	Combined	1st
2001/2002; 4 victories (2 DH, 2 KB); 7 podiums	25 Jan 2002	Cortina d'Ampezzo, Italy	Super-G	2nd
2001/2002; 4 victories (2 DH, 2 KB); 7 podiums	26 Jan 2002	Cortina d'Ampezzo, Italy	Downhill	1st
2001/2002; 4 victories (2 DH, 2 KB); 7 podiums	2 Feb 2002	Åre, Sweden	Downhill	1st
2001/2002; 4 victories (2 DH, 2 KB); 7 podiums	3 Feb 2002	Åre, Sweden	Combined	1st
2002/2003; 4 victories (2 DH, 2 SG); 7 podiums	7 Dec 2002	Lake Louise, Alberta, Canada	Downhill	3rd
2002/2003; 4 victories (2 DH, 2 SG); 7 podiums	15 Jan 2003	Cortina d'Ampezzo, Italy	Super-G	2nd
2002/2003; 4 victories (2 DH, 2 SG); 7 podiums	17 Jan 2003	Cortina d'Ampezzo, Italy	Super-G	1st
2002/2003; 4 victories (2 DH, 2 SG); 7 podiums	18 Jan 2003	Cortina d'Ampezzo, Italy	Downhill	1st
2002/2003; 4 victories (2 DH, 2 SG); 7 podiums	28 Feb 2003	Innsbruck, Austria	Super-G	1st
2002/2003; 4 victories (2 DH, 2 SG); 7 podiums	2 Mar 2003	Innsbruck, Austria	Super-G	3rd
2002/2003; 4 victories (2 DH, 2 SG); 7 podiums	28 Feb 2003	Lillehammer, Norway	Downhill	1st
2003/2004; 6 victories (3 DH, 3 SG); 14 podiums	6 Dec 2003	Lake Louise, Alberta, Canada	Downhill	3rd
2003/2004; 6 victories (3 DH, 3 SG); 14 podiums	7 Dec 2003	Lake Louise, Alberta, Canada	Super-G	1st
2003/2004; 6 victories (3 DH, 3 SG); 14 podiums	20 Dec 2003	St. Moritz, Switzerland	Downhill	1st
2003/2004; 6 victories (3 DH, 3 SG); 14 podiums	27 Dec 2003	Lienz, Austria	Giant slalom	2nd
2003/2004; 6 victories (3 DH, 3 SG); 14 podiums	4 Jan 2004	Megeve, France	Super-G	2nd
2003/2004; 6 victories (3 DH, 3 SG); 14 podiums	10 Jan 2004	Veysonnaz, Switzerland	Downhill	1st
2003/2004; 6 victories (3 DH, 3 SG); 14 podiums	16 Jan 2004	Cortina d'Ampezzo, Italy	Super-G	1st
2003/2004; 6 victories (3 DH, 3 SG); 14 podiums	17 Jan 2004	Cortina d'Ampezzo, Italy	Downhill	2nd
2003/2004; 6 victories (3 DH, 3 SG); 14 podiums	18 Jan 2004	Cortina d'Ampezzo, Italy	Downhill	2nd
2003/2004; 6 victories (3 DH, 3 SG); 14 podiums	30 Jan 2004	Haus im Ennstal, Austria	Downhill	3rd
2003/2004; 6 victories (3 DH, 3 SG); 14 podiums	31 Jan 2004	Haus im Ennstal, Austria	Downhill	2nd
2003/2004; 6 victories (3 DH, 3 SG); 14 podiums	7 Feb 2004	Zwiesel, Germany	Giant slalom	3rd
2003/2004; 6 victories (3 DH, 3 SG); 14 podiums	21 Feb 2004	Åre, Sweden	Super-G	1st
2003/2004; 6 victories (3 DH, 3 SG); 14 podiums	10 Mar 2004	Sestriere, Italy	Downhill	1st
2004/2005; 4 victories (2 DH, 2 SG); 8 podiums	4 Dec 2004	Lake Louise, Alberta, Canada	Downhill	2nd
2004/2005; 4 victories (2 DH, 2 SG); 8 podiums	5 Dec 2004	Lake Louise, Alberta, Canada	Super-G	2nd
2004/2005; 4 victories (2 DH, 2 SG); 8 podiums	7 Jan 2005	Santa Caterina, Italy	Downhill	2nd
2004/2005; 4 victories (2 DH, 2 SG); 8 podiums	12 Jan 2005	Cortina d'Ampezzo, Italy	Super-G	1st
2004/2005; 4 victories (2 DH, 2 SG); 8 podiums	14 Jan 2005	Cortina d'Ampezzo, Italy	Super-G	1st
2004/2005; 4 victories (2 DH, 2 SG); 8 podiums	15 Jan 2005	Cortina d'Ampezzo, Italy	Downhill	1st
2004/2005; 4 victories (2 DH, 2 SG); 8 podiums	16 Jan 2005	Cortina d'Ampezzo, Italy	Downhill	2nd
2004/2005; 4 victories (2 DH, 2 SG); 8 podiums	10 Mar 2005	Lenzerheide, Switzerland	Downhill	1st
2005/2006; 1 victory (1 DH); 2 podiums	21 Jan 2006	St. Moritz, Switzerland	Downhill	2nd
2005/2006; 1 victory (1 DH); 2 podiums	28 Jan 2006	Cortina d'Ampezzo, Italy	Downhill	1st
2006/2007; 8 victories (4 DH, 4 SG); 13 podiums	2 Dec 2006	Lake Louise, Alberta, Canada	Downhill	2nd
2006/2007; 8 victories (4 DH, 4 SG); 13 podiums	3 Dec 2006	Lake Louise, Alberta, Canada	Super-G	1st
2006/2007; 8 victories (4 DH, 4 SG); 13 podiums	16 Dec 2006	Reiteralm, Austria	Super-G	1st
2006/2007; 8 victories (4 DH, 4 SG); 13 podiums	19 Dec 2006	Val-d'Isère, France	Downhill	2nd
2006/2007; 8 victories (4 DH, 4 SG); 13 podiums	13 Jan 2007	Altenmarkt-Zauchensee, Austria	Downhill	1st
2006/2007; 8 victories (4 DH, 4 SG); 13 podiums	19 Jan 2007	Cortina d'Ampezzo, Italy	Super-G	3rd
2006/2007; 8 victories (4 DH, 4 SG); 13 podiums	20 Jan 2007	Cortina d'Ampezzo, Italy	Downhill	1st
2006/2007; 8 victories (4 DH, 4 SG); 13 podiums	26 Jan 2007	San Sicario, Italy	Super-G	1st
2006/2007; 8 victories (4 DH, 4 SG); 13 podiums	27 Jan 2007	San Sicario, Italy	Downhill	1st
2006/2007; 8 victories (4 DH, 4 SG); 13 podiums	28 Jan 2007	San Sicario, Italy	Super-G	2nd
2006/2007; 8 victories (4 DH, 4 SG); 13 podiums	3 Mar 2007	Tarvisio, Italy	Downhill	2nd
2006/2007; 8 victories (4 DH, 4 SG); 13 podiums	4 Mar 2007	Tarvisio, Italy	Super-G	1st
2006/2007; 8 victories (4 DH, 4 SG); 13 podiums	14 Mar 2007	Lenzerheide, Switzerland	Downhill	1st
2007/2008; 6 podiums	1 Dec 2007	Lake Louise, Alberta, Canada	Downhill	2nd
2007/2008; 6 podiums	8 Dec 2007	Aspen, CO, United States	Downhill	3rd
2007/2008; 6 podiums	16 Dec 2007	St. Moritz, Switzerland	Super-G	3rd
2007/2008; 6 podiums	21 Jan 2008	Cortina d'Ampezzo, Italy	Super-G	3rd
2007/2008; 6 podiums	3 Feb 2008	St. Moritz, Switzerland	Super-G	3rd
2007/2008; 6 podiums	8 Mar 2008	Crans-Montana, Switzerland	Downhill	2nd
2008/2009; 1 podium	11 Mar 2009	Åre, Sweden	Downhill	3rd

=== Cup standings ===
Season	Age	Overall	DH	SG	GS	SL	KB
1993	17	57.	–	–	–	18.	–
1994	18	15.	18.	46.	28.	24.	3.
1995	19	14.	10.	4.	–	31.	–
1996	20	10.	7.	5.	51.	47.	–
1997	21	8.	1.	12.	39.	–	–
1998	22	7.	2.	2.	–	–	14.
1999	23	3.	1.	5.	28.	37.	9.
2000	24	1.	2.	1.	10.	14.	1.
2001	25	2.	2.	2.	14.	24.	3.
2002	26	2.	5.	4.	36.	25.	1.
2003	27	7.	2.	2.	51.	–	–
2004	28	2.	1.	1.	13.	47.	–
2005	29	3.	1.	2.	16.	–	7.
2006	30	19.	3.	19.	38.	–	–
2007	31	4.	1.	1.	26.	–	–
2008	32	9.	2.	4.	–	–	–
2009	33	23.	9.	13.	–	–	–

== World Championship results ==
Year	Age	Slalom	Giant Slalom	Super G	Downhill	Combined
1996	20	—	—	20	8	4
1997	21	—	—	6	8	1
1999	23	—	—	2	1	2
2001	25	—	DNF	DNF	2	DNF
2003	27	—	—	8	5	—
2005	29	—	—	23	3	DNF
2007	31	—	—	3	7	—
2009	33	—	—	DNF	24	—

== Olympic results ==
Year	Age	Slalom	Giant Slalom	Super G	Downhill	Combined
1994	18	—	—	DNF	DNF	DNF
1998	22	—	—	5	DNF	DNF
2002	26	DNF	—	8	3	2
2006	30	—	—	26	4	—

Awards
Preceded by Theresia Kiesl	Austrian Sportswoman of the year 1997	Succeeded by Alexandra Meissnitzer
Preceded by Kate Allen	Austrian Sportswoman of the year 2005	Succeeded by Michaela Dorfmeister
Olympic Games
Preceded by Angelika Neuner	Flagbearer for Austria; Turin 2006	Succeeded by Andreas Linger and Wolfgang Linger
