= Mélanie Turgeon =

Canadian skier (born 1976)

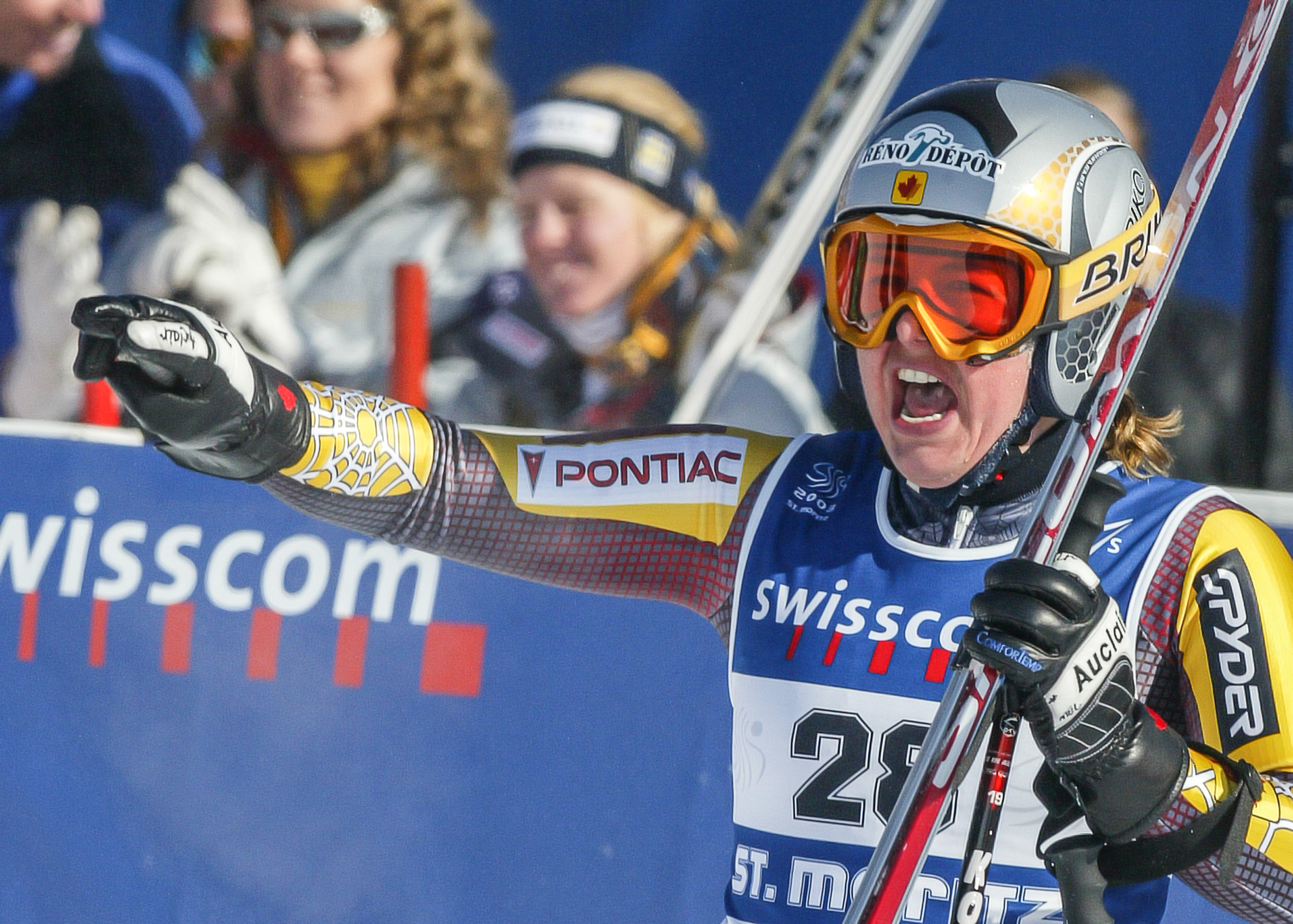

Personal information
- Born: 21 October 1976 (age 49) Alma, Québec, Canada
- Height: 1.64 m (5 ft 5 in)

Skiing career
- Sport: Alpine skiing ♀
- Club: Mont Ste. Anne ski club
- Retired: 2005
- Disciplines: Downhill, super-G, giant slalom, slalom, combined
- World Cup debut: 1998

Olympics
- Teams: 3

World Championships
- Teams: 6
- Medals: 1 (1 gold)

World Cup
- Seasons: 9
- Wins: 1
- Podiums: 8
Medal record
Women's alpine skiing
Representing Canada
International alpine ski competitions
Event	1st	2nd	3rd
World Championships	1	0	0
FIS Alpine Ski World Cup	1	4	3
Total	2	7	3
World Championships
Gold medal – first place	2003 St. Moritz	Downhill

Mélanie Turgeon (born October 21, 1976) is a skier and former member of the Canadian national ski team.

A member of the Mont Ste. Anne ski club, Turgeon joined the Canadian national ski team in 1992 at the age of only sixteen. Two years later she collected five medals at the World Junior Championships, including two gold medals in the giant slalom and combined events.

She competed at the 1994 Winter Olympics in Lillehammer, the 1998 Winter Olympics in Nagano and the 2002 Winter Olympics in Salt Lake City.

In 2003, she won a gold medal in the downhill event at the FIS Alpine World Ski Championships in St. Moritz.

Turgeon sustained a back injury that forced her to sit out the entire 2003–2004 season. She announced her retirement from skiing in October 2005.
