= Andreas Schifferer =

Austrian alpine skier

Medal record

Alpine skiing

Winter Olympics
Bronze medal – third place	2002 Salt Lake City	Super G

World Championships
Bronze medal – third place	1997 Sestriere	Giant slalom

World Cup
Gold medal – first place	1998 World Cup	Downhill Cup
Silver medal – second place	1998 World Cup	Overall Cup
Silver medal – second place	1999 World Cup	Downhill Cup
Bronze medal – third place	1997 World Cup	Super G Cup
Bronze medal – third place	1999 World Cup	Super G Cup

European Cup
Gold medal – first place	1994–95 European Cup	Overall Cup

Andreas "Andi" Schifferer (born 3 August 1974) is a former Austrian alpine skier who was known to be a downhill specialist, but also competed in other disciplines.

== Early life ==
Schifferer was born in Radstadt, Salzburger Land in Austria and skied his first races at the age of three. After his high school period he joined the Skigymnasium school in Stams and was invited to join the Austrian national team, which dominated the World Cups in 1995.

== Career ==
In his first season, 1994/1995 he made his World Cup debut in Val d'Isère, but mainly participated in the European Cup and won two downhills in La Thuile and Saalbach-Hinterglemm. In the other races and disciplines he also qualified among the best skiers, which brought him the Overall European Cup win. He won his first World Cup points the next season, when finishing in 25th position in Adelboden. In the same season, in Bormio he reached his first podium position when he finished in second position at the downhill. In January 1996 he had a severe fall while training on the Streif in Kitzbühel and he suffered a traumatic brain injury and was in a coma for three days, which is why he had to end the season early.

In 1997 at the World Championships in Sestriere he finished in third position at the giant slalom, securing him the bronze medal. He just missed out on a second medal when he finished in fifth position at the downhill. One year later Schifferer had a good season when he won four World Cup meetings in downhill, which resulted in the downhill World Cup win. Due to his good performances during the season on other disciplines as well he finished in second position for the overall World Cup. Only Hermann Maier collected more points. He made his Olympic debut at the 1998 Winter Olympics in Nagano, finishing 7th at the downhill and 19th at the Super G. Also in the 1998–99 season Schifferer achieved good results in downhill competitions. He won for instance two downhill races in two days in Kvitfjell, Norway and ended in second position in the World Cup standing at the end of the year. In the overall rankings he could not repeat his former results and finished in sixth position.

He reached his biggest achievement of his career at the 2002 Winter Olympics in Salt Lake City. At the Super-G discipline he finished in third position behind Kjetil André Aamodt and Stephan Eberharter to win the bronze medal. Schifferer did not win any World Cup meetings since 18 December 1999, but still managed to finish in many podium places instead. In Park City in 2003 he came very close to his next World Cup victory, but only finished in second position, just behind Bode Miller.

Since 2004 Schifferer was no longer able to achieve top rankings in World Cup races, but mainly finished in the middle of the bunch instead. In the 2005–06 season his best result was a 9th position in Val Gardena. During his career he won a total of eight World Cup meetings, seven in downhill and one on the Super G.

On 13 December 2006 Schifferer announced his retirement from the sport.

== Statistics ==
	downhill	giant slalom	super g	combined	parallel	total
World Cup victories	7	0	1	0	0	8
World Cup podiums	12	7	9	0	0	28
World Cup top tens	43	30	31	4	1	109

World Cup victories
date	venue	discipline
13 March 1997	Vail	Super G
5 December 1997	Beaver Creek	Downhill
30 December 1997	Bormio	Downhill
17 January 1998	Wengen	Downhill
31 January 1998	Garmisch-Partenkirchen	Downhill
5 March 1999	Kvitfjell	Downhill
6 March 1999	Kvitfjell	Downhill
18 December 1999	Val Gardena	Downhill

First World Cup start	1994 Val d'Isère
First World Cup points	1995 Adelboden
First World Cup podium	1995 Bormio

Statistics updated until: 26 November 2006
