= 1981 Alpine Skiing World Cup – Men's overall =

1981 men's overall World Cup
Previous: 1980	Next: 1982

Men's overall World Cup 1980/1981

== Final point standings ==
In men's overall World Cup 1980/81 the best five downhills, best five giant slaloms, best five slaloms and best three combined count.

Place	Name	Country	Total points	Total deduction	Downhill		Giant slalom		Slalom		Combined
1	Phil Mahre	United States	266	(97)	10		84	(47)	97	(23)	75	(27)
2	Ingemar Stenmark	Sweden	260	(156)	0		125	(95)	120	(61)	15
3	Aleksandr Zhirov	Soviet Union	185	(54)	0		115	(44)	70	(10)	0
4	Steve Mahre	United States	155	(12)	0		46	(3)	80	(9)	29
5	Peter Müller	Switzerland	140	(23)	95	(23)	0		0		45
6	Bojan Križaj	Yugoslavia	137	(15)	0		40	(5)	80	(10)	17
7	Andreas Wenzel	Liechtenstein	130	(3)	9		38	(3)	28		55
8	Harti Weirather	Austria	115	(56)	115	(56)	0		0		0
9	Steve Podborski	Canada	110	(57)	110	(57)	0		0		0
10	Christian Orlainsky	Austria	105		0		61		44		0
11	Joël Gaspoz	Switzerland	102	(14)	0		71	(14)	31		0
12	Leonhard Stock	Austria	97		43		34		0		20
13	Jarle Halsnes	Norway	95	(17)	0		50	(11)	45	(6)	0
14	Hans Enn	Austria	93		2		52		8		31
15	Jacques Lüthy	Switzerland	84	(21)	0		53	(21)	11		20
16	Bruno Nöckler	Italy	79	(23)	0		56	(23)	23		0
17	Paul Frommelt	Liechtenstein	77	(7)	0		0		77	(7)	0
18	Peter Wirnsberger	Austria	73	(9)	73	(9)	0		0		0
	Valeri Tsyganov	Soviet Union	73		55		1		0		17
20	Vladimir Andreev	Soviet Union	72	(9)	0		10		62	(9)	0
21	Jean-Luc Fournier	Switzerland	62	(9)	0		62	(9)	0		0
	Boris Strel	Yugoslavia	62	(6)	0		45	(6)	0		17
23	Ulrich Spieß	Austria	56		56		0		0		0
24	Toni Bürgler	Switzerland	55		55		0		0		0
	Franz Gruber	Austria	53	(5)	0		8		45	(5)	0
26	Marc Girardelli	Luxembourg	51		0		11		40		0
27	Herbert Plank	Italy	49		29		0		0		20
28	Piero Gros	Italy	48	(7)	0		0		48	(7)	0
	Gerhard Pfaffenbichler	Austria	48		48		0		0		0
30	Helmut Höflehner	Austria	47	(10)	47	(10)	0		0		0
31	Stig Strand	Sweden	46	(23)	0		0		46	(23)	0
	Pirmin Zurbriggen	Switzerland	46	(2)	0		35	(2)	0		0
33	Bengt Fjällberg	Sweden	45		0		0		45		0
	Hannes Spiss	Austria	45	(7)	0		45	(7)	0		0
35	Gerhard Jäger	Austria	44		0		44		0		0
36	Franz Heinzer	Switzerland	43		43		0		0		0
	Paolo De Chiesa	Italy	43	(4)	0		0		43	(4)	0
38	Ken Read	Canada	42		42		0		0		0
39	Wolfram Ortner	Austria	41	(2)	0		30	(2)	11		0
40	Franz Klammer	Austria	37	(3)	37	(3)	0		0		0
41	Josef Walcher	Austria	33		33		0		0		0
42	Erwin Resch	Austria	32		32		0		0		0
	Jože Kuralt	Yugoslavia	32		0		15		10		7
44	Siegfried Kerschbaumer	Italy	31		3		0		0		28
45	Paul Arne Skajem	Norway	28		0		27		1		0
46	Werner Grissmann	Austria	27		27		0		0		0
	Odd Sørli	Norway	27		0		16		11		0
48	Vladimir Makeev	Soviet Union	26		26		0		0		0
49	Michael Veith	West Germany	25		21		0		0		4
50	Petar Popangelov	Bulgaria	24		0		0		24		0
	Conradin Cathomen	Switzerland	24		24		0		0		0
52	Dave Irwin	Canada	23		23		0		0		0
53	Dave Murray	Canada	20		20		0		0		0
	Walter Vesti	Switzerland	20		20		0		0		0
	Even Hole	Norway	20		0		0		0		20
	Pete Patterson	United States	20		20		0		0		0
57	Henri Mollin	Belgium	18		0		0		0		18
58	Peter Lüscher	Switzerland	17		7		0		0		10
59	Peter Mally	Italy	16		0		0		16		0
60	Roberto Grigis	Italy	15		0		0		15		0
	Urs Räber	Switzerland	15		15		0		0		0
	Herbert Renoth	West Germany	15		0		0		0		15
	Silvano Meli	Switzerland	15		15		0		0		0
64	Toshihiro Kaiwa	Japan	14	(1)	0		0		14	(1)	0
65	Chris Kent	Canada	12		12		0		0		0
	Andy Mill	United States	12		12		0		0		0
	Bohumír Zeman	Czechoslovakia	12		0		0		0		12
	Erwin Josi	Switzerland	12		12		0		0		0
	Doug Powell	United States	12		12		0		0		0
	Giuliano Giardini	Italy	12		12		0		0		0
71	Mike Farney	United States	11		0		0		0		11
	Torsten Jakobsson	Sweden	11		0		11		0		0
73	Klaus Gattermann	West Germany	10		0		0		0		10
	Christian Neureuther	West Germany	10		0		0		10		0
	Hiroaki Ohtaka	Japan	10		0		0		0		10
	John Buxman	United States	10		0		0		10		0
	Lars-Göran Halvarsson	Sweden	10		0		0		10		0
	Hubert Strolz	Austria	10		0		10		0		0
	Ricardo Foppa	Italy	10		0		10		0		0
80	Peter Roth	West Germany	9		0		0		0		9
	Shinya Chiba	Japan	9		0		0		0		9
	Alex Giorgi	Italy	9		0		9		0		0
83	Frank Wörndl	West Germany	8		0		1		7		0
	Kurt Gubser	Switzerland	8		0		2		6		0
85	Robert McKee	Ireland	7		0		0		0		7
	Ernst Riedlsperger	Austria	7		0		7		0		0
87	Didier Bouvet	France	6		0		0		6		0
	Grega Benedik	Yugoslavia	6		0		0		0		6
	Sepp Wildgruber	West Germany	6		0		0		0		6
	Hubert Nachbauer	Austria	6		6		0		0		0
91	Philippe Pugnat	France	4		4		0		0		0
	Marco Tonazzi	Italy	4		0		0		4		0
	Alain Navillod	France	4		0		4		0		0
	Ivan Pacek	Czechoslovakia	4		0		0		0		4
	Patrick Lamotte	France	4		0		0		4		0
	Albert Burger	West Germany	4		0		4		0		0
97	Miroslav Oberstar	Yugoslavia	3		0		0		0		3
98	Rune Safvenberg	Sweden	2		0		0		0		2
	Janez Zibler	Yugoslavia	2		0		0		0		2
	Michel Canac	France	2		0		0		2		0
	Klaus Heidegger	Austria	2		0		0		2		0
	Gérard Ramboud	France	2		2		0		0		0
103	Karl Anderson	United States	1		1		0		0		0
	Tomaž Cerkovnik	Yugoslavia	1		0		0		0		1
	Helmut Gstrein	Austria	1		0		0		1		0
	Florian Beck	West Germany	1		0		0		1		0

Alpine skiing World Cup
Men

Overall | Downhill | Giant slalom | Slalom | Combined

1981
