= 1982 Alpine Skiing World Cup – Men's overall =

1982 men's overall World Cup
Previous: 1981	Next: 1983

Men's overall World Cup 1981/1982

== Final point standings ==
In men's overall World Cup 1981/82 the best five downhills, best five giant slaloms, best five slaloms and best three combined count. Deductions are given in ().

Place	Name	Country	Total points	Total deduction	Downhill		Giant slalom		Slalom		Combined
1	Phil Mahre	United States	309	(125)	9		105	(70)	120	(55)	75
2	Ingemar Stenmark	Sweden	211	(74)	0		101	(19)	110	(55)	0
3	Steve Mahre	United States	183	(5)	0		66		92	(5)	25
4	Peter Müller	Switzerland	132	(27)	115	(27)	0		0		17
5	Andreas Wenzel	Liechtenstein	128	(4)	0		36	(4)	32		60
6	Marc Girardelli	Luxembourg	121	(18)	0		77	(12)	44	(6)	0
7	Joël Gaspoz	Switzerland	119	(18)	0		70	(18)	49		0
8	Steve Podborski	Canada	115	(33)	115	(33)	0		0		0
9	Bojan Križaj	Yugoslavia	108	(7)	0		45	(3)	63	(4)	0
10	Harti Weirather	Austria	97	(33)	97	(33)	0		0		0
11	Pirmin Zurbriggen	Switzerland	96	(20)	0		67	(20)	4		25
12	Erwin Resch	Austria	76	(9)	76	(9)	0		0		0
13	Hans Enn	Austria	75		0		75		0		0
14	Franz Klammer	Austria	71	(4)	71	(4)	0		0		0
15	Franz Gruber	Austria	69	(9)	0		3		66	(9)	0
16	Paolo De Chiesa	Italy	68	(8)	0		0		68	(8)	0
17	Ken Read	Canada	65	(8)	65	(8)	0		0		0
18	Leonhard Stock	Austria	64		49		0		0		15
19	Jacques Lüthy	Switzerland	63		0		33		30		0
20	Hubert Strolz	Austria	59		0		44		15		0
21	Silvano Meli	Switzerland	56	(4)	42	(4)	0		0		14
22	Toni Bürgler	Switzerland	54	(9)	54	(9)	0		0		0
23	Peter Wirnsberger	Austria	53	(11)	53	(11)	0		0		0
24	Helmut Höflehner	Austria	51	(6)	51	(6)	0		0		0
	Wolfram Ortner	Austria	51	(1)	0		34	(1)	17		0
26	Franz Heinzer	Switzerland	50	(7)	50	(7)	0		0		0
27	Christian Orlainsky	Austria	48		0		15		33		0
28	Peter Lüscher	Switzerland	46		8		11		3		24
	Conradin Cathomen	Switzerland	46		46		0		0		0
30	Gustav Oehrli	Switzerland	45	(7)	45	(7)	0		0		0
31	Paul Frommelt	Liechtenstein	44		0		0		44		0
32	Todd Brooker	Canada	43	(3)	43	(3)	0		0		0
	Jean-Luc Fournier	Switzerland	43	(5)	0		43	(5)	0		0
34	Stig Strand	Sweden	39	(6)	0		0		39	(6)	0
35	Aleksandr Zhirov	Soviet Union	38		0		19		7		12
	Michel Vion	France	38		0		0		10		28
37	Even Hole	Norway	37	(5)	0		0		0		37	(5)
	Bruno Nöckler	Italy	37	(1)	0		23	(1)	14		0
39	Valeri Tsyganov	Soviet Union	36		24		1		0		11
40	Anton Steiner	Austria	34		0		0		34		0
41	Jarle Halsnes	Norway	31		0		12		19		0
42	Hubertus von Hohenlohe	Mexico	29	(9)	0		0		0		29	(9)
	Boris Strel	Yugoslavia	29		0		29		0		0
	Michael Mair	Italy	29		17		0		0		12
45	Klaus Gattermann	West Germany	28		0		0		0		28
	Max Julen	Switzerland	28		0		28		0		0
47	Gerhard Pfaffenbichler	Austria	27	(2)	27	(2)	0		0		0
	Dave Irwin	Canada	27		27		0		0		0
	Alex Giorgi	Italy	27		0		16		11		0
50	Piero Gros	Italy	26		0		0		26		0
	Josef Walcher	Austria	26		26		0		0		0
52	Konrad Bartelski	United Kingdom	25		25		0		0		0
	Ivano Edalini	Italy	25		0		2		23		0
54	Gerhard Jäger	Austria	23		0		23		0		0
55	Scott Sánchez	Bolivia	21		0		0		0		21
56	Ivan Pacek	Czechoslovakia	20		0		0		0		20
	Shinya Chiba	Japan	20		0		0		0		20
58	Torsten Jakobsson	Sweden	19		0		19		0		0
59	Ernst Riedlsperger	Austria	17		0		17		0		0
	Bengt Fjällberg	Sweden	17		0		0		17		0
	Jože Kuralt	Yugoslavia	17		0		14		3		0
	Helmut Gstrein	Austria	17		0		0		17		0
	Paul Arne Skajem	Norway	17		0		14		3		0
	Petar Popangelov	Bulgaria	17		0		0		17		0
	Jure Franko	Yugoslavia	17		0		17		0		0
66	Peter Roth	West Germany	15		0		0		0		15
	Vladimir Makeev	Soviet Union	15		15		0		0		0
	Thomas Kementar	Italy	15		0		0		0		15
69	Marco Tonazzi	Italy	14		0		0		14		0
70	Peter Mally	Italy	13		0		0		13		0
71	Lars-Göran Halvarsson	Sweden	12		0		0		12		0
	Odd Sørli	Norway	12		0		4		8		0
73	Mauro Cornaz	Italy	11		11		0		0		0
	Peter Dürr	West Germany	11		0		0		0		11
75	Bernhard Flaschberger	Austria	10		10		0		0		0
	Michihiko Nakamura	Japan	10		0		0		0		10
	Bohumír Zeman	Czechoslovakia	10		0		0		3		7
78	Patrick Lamotte	France	9		0		9		0		0
	Urs Räber	Switzerland	9		9		0		0		0
80	Antony Guss	Australia	8		0		0		0		8
81	Henri Mollin	Belgium	7		0		0		0		7
	Paul Mahre	United States	7		7		0		0		0
	Martin Hangl	Switzerland	7		0		7		0		0
84	Ulrich Spieß	Austria	6		6		0		0		0
	Walter Vesti	Switzerland	6		6		0		0		0
	Vladimir Andreev	Soviet Union	6		0		0		6		0
87	Hannes Spiss	Austria	5		0		5		0		0
	Dave Murray	Canada	5		5		0		0		0
	Marc Fulton	New Zealand	5		0		0		0		5
	Guido Hinterseer	Austria	5		0		5		0		0
	Michel Canac	France	5		0		0		5		0
92	Philippe Verneret	France	4		4		0		0		0
93	Toshihiro Kaiwa	Japan	3		0		0		3		0
	Doug Powell	United States	3		3		0		0		0
	Oskar Delago	Italy	3		3		0		0		0
	Bob Styan	Canada	3		3		0		0		0
97	Kurt Gubser	Switzerland	2		0		2		0		0
	Roberto Grigis	Italy	2		0		0		2		0
	Egon Hirt	West Germany	2		0		0		2		0
100	Giuseppe Carletti	Italy	1		0		1		0		0
	Florian Beck	West Germany	1		0		0		1		0
	Bruno Fretz	Switzerland	1		1		0		0		0
	Daniel Fontaine	France	1		0		0		1		0
	Hans Pieren	Switzerland	1		0		1		0		0
	Karl Alpiger	Switzerland	1		1		0		0		0

Alpine skiing World Cup
Men

Overall | Downhill | Giant slalom | Slalom | Combined

1982
