= 1982 Alpine Skiing World Cup – Men's giant slalom =

1982 Men's giant slalom World Cup
Previous: 1981	Next: 1983

Men's giant slalom World Cup 1981/1982

== Calendar ==
Round	Race No	Place	Country	Date	Winner	Second	Third
1	2	Aprica	Italy	December 8, 1981	(Switzerland) Joël Gaspoz	(United States) Phil Mahre	(Sweden) Ingemar Stenmark
2	8	Cortina d'Ampezzo	Italy	December 15, 1981	(Socialist Federal Republic of Yugoslavia) Boris Strel	(United States) Phil Mahre	(Switzerland) Joël Gaspoz
3	10	Morzine	France	January 9, 1982	(Sweden) Ingemar Stenmark	(United States) Phil Mahre	(Luxembourg) Marc Girardelli
4	16	Adelboden	Switzerland	January 19, 1982	(Sweden) Ingemar Stenmark	(United States) Phil Mahre	(Switzerland) Max Julen
5	20	Kirchberg in Tirol	Austria	February 9, 1982	(Sweden) Ingemar Stenmark	(United States) Phil Mahre	(Luxembourg) Marc Girardelli
6	27	Jasná	Czechoslovakia	March 13, 1982	(United States) Steve Mahre	(Austria) Hans Enn	(United States) Phil Mahre
7	29	Bad Kleinkirchheim	Austria	March 17, 1982	(United States) Steve Mahre	(United States) Phil Mahre	(Switzerland) Pirmin Zurbriggen
8	30	Kranjska Gora	Yugoslavia	March 19, 1982	(United States) Phil Mahre	(Austria) Hans Enn	(Luxembourg) Marc Girardelli
9	32	San Sicario	Italy	March 24, 1982	(Switzerland) Pirmin Zurbriggen	(Luxembourg) Marc Girardelli	(United States) Phil Mahre

== Final point standings ==
In men's giant slalom World Cup 1981/82 the best 5 results count. Deductions are given in ().

Place	Name	Country	Total points	Deduction	2 (Italy)	8 (Italy)	10 (France)	16 (Switzerland)	20 (Austria)	27 (Czechoslovakia)	29 (Austria)	30 (Socialist Federal Republic of Yugoslavia)	32 (Italy)
1	Phil Mahre	United States	105	(70)	20	20	20	20	(20)	(15)	(20)	25	(15)
2	Ingemar Stenmark	Sweden	101	(19)	15	(9)	25	25	25	(10)	-	-	11
3	Marc Girardelli	Luxembourg	77	(12)	-	12	15	-	15	-	(12)	15	20
4	Hans Enn	Austria	75		-	-	-	-	12	20	11	20	12
5	Joël Gaspoz	Switzerland	70	(18)	25	15	8	(7)	(5)	(6)	-	12	10
6	Pirmin Zurbriggen	Switzerland	67	(20)	(6)	10	-	9	8	(8)	15	(6)	25
7	Steve Mahre	United States	66		8	-	-	-	2	25	25	-	6
8	Bojan Križaj	Yugoslavia	45	(3)	11	12	-	-	7	11	4	(3)	-
9	Hubert Strolz	Austria	44		-	-	11	12	-	12	-	-	9
10	Jean-Luc Fournier	Switzerland	43	(5)	12	-	6	6	-	9	10	(5)	-
11	Andreas Wenzel	Liechtenstein	36	(4)	5	8	-	-	-	(4)	8	8	7
12	Wolfram Ortner	Austria	34	(1)	-	5	-	8	11	(1)	3	7	-
13	Jacques Lüthy	Switzerland	33		-	3	-	10	-	7	5	-	8
14	Boris Strel	Yugoslavia	29		-	25	-	-	4	-	-	-	-
15	Max Julen	Switzerland	25		-	-	3	15	-	-	-	10	-
16	Gerhard Jäger	Austria	23		-	3	7	2	-	5	6	-	-
	Bruno Nöckler	Italy	23	(1)	9	6	-	4	-	2	(1)	2	-
18	Aleksandr Zhirov	Soviet Union	19		7	-	12	-	-	-	-	-	-
	Torsten Jakobsson	Sweden	19		4	-	10	5	-	-	-	-	-
20	Ernst Riedlsperger	Austria	17		10	7	-	-	-	-	-	-	-
	Jure Franko	Yugoslavia	17		-	-	-	-	10	-	-	4	3
22	Alex Giorgi	Italy	16		-	-	-	3	3	-	9	-	1
23	Christian Orlainsky	Austria	15		3	1	-	-	-	-	-	11	-
24	Paul Arne Skajem	Norway	14		-	-	2	-	-	3	-	9	-
	Jože Kuralt	Yugoslavia	14		-	-	4	-	9	-	-	1	-
26	Jarle Halsnes	Norway	12		-	-	-	-	6	-	2	-	4
27	Peter Lüscher	Switzerland	11		-	-	-	11	-	-	-	-	-
28	Patrick Lamotte	France	9		-	-	9	-	-	-	-	-	-
29	Martin Hangl	Switzerland	7		-	-	-	-	-	-	7	-	-
30	Hannes Spiss	Austria	5		-	-	5	-	-	-	-	-	-
	Guido Hinterseer	Austria	5		-	-	-	-	-	-	-	-	5
32	Odd Sørli	Norway	4		-	4	-	-	-	-	-	-	-
33	Franz Gruber	Austria	3		-	-	-	-	-	-	-	-	3
34	Kurt Gubser	Switzerland	2		2	-	-	-	-	-	-	-	-
	Ivano Edalini	Italy	2		-	-	-	-	2	-	-	-	-
36	Giuseppe Carletti	Italy	1		1	-	-	-	-	-	-	-	-
	Valeri Tsyganov	Soviet Union	1		-	-	1	-	-	-	-	-	-
	Hans Pieren	Switzerland	1		-	-	-	1	-	-	-	-	-

== Men's giant slalom team results ==
All points were shown including individuel deduction. bold indicate highest score - italics indicate race wins

Place	Country	Total points	2 (Italy)	8 (Italy)	10 (France)	16 (Switzerland)	20 (Austria)	27 (Czechoslovakia)	29 (Austria)	30 (Socialist Federal Republic of Yugoslavia)	32 (Italy)	Racers	Wins
1	Switzerland	305	45	28	17	**59**	13	30	37	33	43	9	2
2	United States	241	28	20	20	20	22	40	45	25	21	2	3
3	Austria	222	13	16	23	22	23	38	20	38	29	9	0
4	Sweden	139	19	9	35	30	25	10	-	-	11	2	3
5	Yugoslavia	108	11	37	4	-	30	11	4	8	3	4	1
6	Luxembourg	89	-	12	15	-	15	-	12	15	20	1	0
7	Italy	43	10	6	-	7	5	2	10	2	1	4	0
8	Liechtenstein	40	5	8	-	-	-	4	8	8	7	1	0
9	Norway	30	-	4	2	-	6	3	2	9	4	3	0
10	Soviet Union	20	7	-	13	-	-	-	-	-	-	2	0
11	France	9	-	-	9	-	-	-	-	-	-	1	0

**Alpine Skiing World Cup**
**Men**

Overall | Downhill | Giant slalom | Slalom | Combined

**1982**
