= 1981 Alpine Skiing World Cup – Men's giant slalom =

1981 Men's giant slalom World Cup
Previous: 1980	Next: 1982

Men's giant slalom World Cup 1980/1981

== Calendar ==
Round	Race No	Place	Country	Date	Winner	Second	Third
1	3	Madonna di Campiglio	Italy	December 10, 1980	(Sweden) Ingemar Stenmark	(Soviet Union) Aleksandr Zhirov	(Austria) Gerhard Jäger
2	8	Ebnat Kappel	Switzerland	January 4, 1981	(Austria) Christian Orlainsky	(Austria) Hans Enn	(Switzerland) Jean-Luc Fournier
3	10	Morzine	France	January 6, 1981	(Sweden) Ingemar Stenmark	(Switzerland) Joël Gaspoz	(Socialist Federal Republic of Yugoslavia) Bojan Križaj
4	20	Adelboden	Switzerland	January 26, 1981	(Sweden) Ingemar Stenmark	(Austria) Christian Orlainsky (Socialist Federal Republic of Yugoslavia) Boris Strel
5	24	Schladming	Austria	February 2, 1981	(Sweden) Ingemar Stenmark	(Austria) Hans Enn	(Switzerland) Jean-Luc Fournier
6	26	Voss	Norway	February 11, 1981	(Sweden) Ingemar Stenmark	(Soviet Union) Aleksandr Zhirov	(Italy) Bruno Nöckler
7	27	Åre	Sweden	February 14, 1981	(Sweden) Ingemar Stenmark	(Soviet Union) Aleksandr Zhirov	(United States) Phil Mahre
8	31	Aspen	United States	March 7, 1981	(United States) Phil Mahre	(Sweden) Ingemar Stenmark	(United States) Steve Mahre
9	32	Furano	Japan	March 14, 1981	(Soviet Union) Aleksandr Zhirov	(Austria) Gerhard Jäger	(Sweden) Ingemar Stenmark
10	34	Borovets	Bulgaria	March 24, 1981	(Soviet Union) Aleksandr Zhirov	(Sweden) Ingemar Stenmark	(Switzerland) Joël Gaspoz
11	36	Laax	Switzerland	March 28, 1981	(Soviet Union) Aleksandr Zhirov	(United States) Phil Mahre	(Sweden) Ingemar Stenmark

== Final point standings ==
In men's giant slalom World Cup 1980/81 the best 5 results count. Deductions are given in ().

Place	Name	Country	Total points	Deduction	3 (Italy)	8 (Switzerland)	10 (France)	20 (Switzerland)	24 (Austria)	26 (Norway)	27 (Sweden)	31 (United States)	32 (Japan)	34 (Bulgaria)	36 (Switzerland)
1	Ingemar Stenmark	Sweden	125	(95)	25	-	25	25	25	25	(25)	(20)	(15)	(20)	(15)
2	Aleksandr Zhirov	Soviet Union	115	(44)	20	-	(5)	-	(9)	20	(20)	(10)	25	25	25
3	Phil Mahre	United States	84	(47)	(8)	12	12	(8)	(10)	(10)	15	25	-	(11)	20
4	Joël Gaspoz	Switzerland	71	(14)	-	(7)	20	-	(4)	12	-	12	12	15	(3)
5	Jean-Luc Fournier	Switzerland	62	(9)	-	15	-	9	15	-	12	11	(3)	-	(6)
6	Christian Orlainsky	Austria	61		2	25	6	20	8	-	-	-	-	-	-
7	Bruno Nöckler	Italy	56	(23)	10	8	11	(6)	12	15	-	(8)	(6)	(3)	-
8	Jacques Lüthy	Switzerland	53	(21)	9	10	(7)	12	11	(6)	11	-	(8)	-	-
9	Hans Enn	Austria	52		12	20	-	-	20	-	-	-	-	-	-
10	Jarle Halsnes	Norway	50	(11)	-	(4)	-	11	(7)	11	8	-	-	12	8
11	Steve Mahre	United States	46	(3)	11	-	-	-	5	(3)	5	15	-	10	-
12	Hannes Spiss	Austria	45	(7)	-	11	(1)	-	-	7	-	7	9	(6)	11
	Boris Strel	Yugoslavia	45	(6)	-	-	-	20	6	(1)	(2)	(3)	7	7	5
14	Gerhard Jäger	Austria	44		15	5	3	-	-	-	-	1	20	-	-
15	Bojan Križaj	Yugoslavia	40	(5)	6	-	15	-	(3)	-	6	4	(2)	9	-
16	Andreas Wenzel	Liechtenstein	38	(3)	7	9	10	7	-	-	(3)	5	-	-	-
17	Pirmin Zurbriggen	Switzerland	35	(2)	-	-	9	10	-	4	-	-	10	2	(2)
18	Leonhard Stock	Austria	34		-	-	8	-	-	-	-	-	11	5	10
19	Wolfram Ortner	Austria	30	(2)	5	3	-	(1)	(1)	8	9	-	5	-	-
20	Paul Arne Skajem	Norway	27		-	-	4	4	-	-	7	-	-	-	12
21	Odd Sørli	Norway	16		-	-	-	-	-	-	10	2	-	4	-
22	Jože Kuralt	Yugoslavia	15		-	1	-	5	-	5	-	-	4	-	-
23	Marc Girardelli	Luxembourg	11		-	-	2	-	-	-	-	9	-	-	-
	Torsten Jakobsson	Sweden	11		-	-	-	3	-	2	-	6	-	-	-
25	Hubert Strolz	Austria	10		-	-	-	-	-	-	-	-	-	1	9
	Vladimir Andreev	Soviet Union	10		3	-	-	-	-	-	-	-	-	-	7
	Riccardo Foppa	Italy	10		-	-	-	-	-	-	1	-	-	8	1
28	Alex Giorgi	Italy	9		-	-	-	-	-	9	-	-	-	-	-
29	Franz Gruber	Austria	8		-	6	-	-	2	-	-	-	-	-	-
30	Ernst Riedlsperger	Austria	7		-	3	-	-	-	-	4	-	-	-	-
31	Alain Navillod	France	4		4	-	-	-	-	-	-	-	-	-	-
	Albert Burger	West Germany	4		-	-	-	-	-	-	-	-	-	-	4
33	Kurt Gubser	Switzerland	2		-	-	-	2	-	-	-	-	-	-	-
34	Frank Wörndl	West Germany	1		1	-	-	-	-	-	-	-	-	-	-
	Valeri Tsyganov	Soviet Union	1		-	-	-	-	-	-	-	-	1	-	-

== Men's giant slalom team results ==
All points were shown including individuel deduction. bold indicate highest score - italics indicate race wins

Place	Country	Total points	3 (Italy)	8 (Switzerland)	10 (France)	20 (Switzerland)	24 (Austria)	26 (Norway)	27 (Sweden)	31 (United States)	32 (Japan)	34 (Bulgaria)	36 (Switzerland)	Racers	Wins
1	Austria	300	34	**73**	18	21	31	15	13	8	45	12	30	9	1
2	Sweden	231	25	-	25	28	25	27	25	26	15	20	15	2	6
3	Switzerland	198	9	17	36	24	15	22	11	12	20	17	5	4	0
4	United States	180	19	12	12	8	15	13	20	40	-	21	20	2	1
5	Soviet Union	170	23	-	5	-	9	20	20	10	26	25	32	3	3
6	Yugoslavia	111	6	1	15	25	9	6	8	7	13	16	5	3	0
7	Norway	104	-	4	4	15	7	11	25	2	-	16	20	3	0
8	Italy	98	10	8	11	6	12	24	1	8	6	11	1	3	0
9	France	75	4	15	-	9	15	-	12	11	3	-	6	2	0
10	Liechtenstein	41	7	9	10	7	-	-	3	5	-	-	-	1	0
11	Luxembourg	11	-	-	2	-	-	-	-	9	-	-	-	1	0
12	West Germany	5	1	-	-	-	-	-	-	-	-	-	4	2	0

**Alpine Skiing World Cup**
**Men**

Overall | Downhill | **Giant slalom** | Slalom | Combined

**1981**
