= 1982 Alpine Skiing World Cup – Men's slalom =

1982 Men's slalom World Cup
Previous: 1981	Next: 1983

Men's slalom World Cup 1981/1982

== Calendar ==
Round	Race No	Place	Country	Date	Winner	Second	Third
1	4	Madonna di Campiglio	Italy	December 9, 1981	(United States) Phil Mahre	(Sweden) Ingemar Stenmark	(Italy) Paolo De Chiesa
2	7	Cortina d'Ampezzo	Italy	December 14, 1981	(United States) Steve Mahre	(United States) Phil Mahre	(Sweden) Ingemar Stenmark
3	11	Bad Wiessee	West Germany	January 12, 1982	(Sweden) Ingemar Stenmark	(Austria) Franz Gruber	(United States) Phil Mahre
4	15	Kitzbühel	Austria	January 17, 1982	(Sweden) Ingemar Stenmark	(United States) Phil Mahre	(United States) Steve Mahre (Italy) Paolo De Chiesa
5	18	Wengen	Switzerland	January 24, 1982	(United States) Phil Mahre	(Sweden) Ingemar Stenmark	(Liechtenstein) Paul Frommelt
6	22	Garmisch-Partenkirchen	West Germany	February 14, 1982	(United States) Steve Mahre	(United States) Phil Mahre	(Italy) Paolo De Chiesa
7	28	Jasná	Czechoslovakia	March 14, 1982	(United States) Phil Mahre	(Sweden) Ingemar Stenmark	(United States) Steve Mahre (Austria) Anton Steiner
8	31	Kranjska Gora	Yugoslavia	March 20, 1982	(Socialist Federal Republic of Yugoslavia) Bojan Križaj	(Sweden) Ingemar Stenmark	(Austria) Franz Gruber
9	33	Montgènevre	France	March 26, 1982	(United States) Phil Mahre	(Sweden) Ingemar Stenmark	(Switzerland) Joël Gaspoz

== Final point standings ==
In men's slalom World Cup 1981/82 the best 5 results count. Deductions are given in ().

Place	Name	Country	Total points	Deduction	4 (Italy)	7 (Italy)	11 (Germany)	15 (Austria)	18 (Switzerland)	22 (Germany)	28 (Czechoslovakia)	31 (Socialist Federal Republic of Yugoslavia)	33 (France)
1	Phil Mahre	United States	120	(55)	25	20	(15)	(20)	25	(20)	25	-	25
2	Ingemar Stenmark	Sweden	110	(55)	20	(15)	25	25	20	-	20	(20)	(20)
3	Steve Mahre	United States	92	(5)	(5)	25	-	15	12	25	15	-	-
4	Paolo De Chiesa	Italy	68	(8)	15	11	12	15	(8)	15	-	-	-
5	Franz Gruber	Austria	66	(9)	(9)	10	20	-	-	12	-	15	9
6	Bojan Križaj	Yugoslavia	63	(4)	4	-	(4)	-	11	-	11	25	12
7	Joël Gaspoz	Switzerland	49		2	12	-	-	-	8	-	12	15
8	Paul Frommelt	Liechtenstein	44		12	-	8	9	15	-	-	-	-
	Marc Girardelli	Luxembourg	44	(6)	6	9	(6)	-	9	-	9	11	-
10	Stig Strand	Sweden	39	(6)	8	-	-	8	6	-	(6)	9	8
11	Anton Steiner	Austria	34		-	-	-	5	7	7	15	-	-
12	Christian Orlainsky	Austria	33		7	-	-	-	-	11	-	8	7
13	Andreas Wenzel	Liechtenstein	32		1	-	11	-	10	-	-	-	10
14	Jacques Lüthy	Switzerland	30		-	-	5	-	-	9	1	4	11
15	Piero Gros	Italy	26		11	-	9	-	-	6	-	-	-
16	Ivano Edalini	Italy	23		-	-	-	-	-	-	8	10	5
17	Jarle Halsnes	Norway	19		10	-	3	4	2	-	-	-	-
18	Bengt Fjällberg	Sweden	17		-	6	-	11	-	-	-	-	-
	Wolfram Ortner	Austria	17		-	-	-	-	-	-	10	7	-
	Helmut Gstrein	Austria	17		-	-	-	6	1	5	-	5	-
	Petar Popangelov	Bulgaria	17		-	1	7	-	3	-	4	2	-
22	Hubert Strolz	Austria	15		-	8	-	-	-	-	7	-	-
23	Bruno Nöckler	Italy	14		-	5	2	-	5	-	2	-	-
	Marco Tonazzi	Italy	14		-	3	-	10	-	-	-	1	-
25	Peter Mally	Italy	13		-	-	10	3	-	-	-	-	-
26	Lars-Göran Halvarsson	Sweden	12		-	-	-	7	-	-	5	-	-
27	Alex Giorgi	Italy	11		-	-	-	-	-	-	3	6	2
28	Michel Vion	France	10		-	-	-	-	-	10	-	-	-
29	Odd Sørli	Norway	8		-	-	-	-	-	4	-	-	4
30	Aleksandr Zhirov	Soviet Union	7		-	7	-	-	-	-	-	-	-
31	Vladimir Andreev	Soviet Union	6		-	-	-	-	-	-	-	-	6
32	Michel Canac	France	5		-	-	-	-	4	-	-	-	1
33	Pirmin Zurbriggen	Switzerland	4		-	4	-	-	-	-	-	-	-
34	Toshihiro Kaiwa	Japan	3		3	-	-	-	-	-	-	-	-
	Jože Kuralt	Yugoslavia	3		-	-	-	-	-	3	-	-	-
	Peter Lüscher	Switzerland	3		-	-	-	2	-	1	-	-	-
	Paul Arne Skajem	Norway	3		-	-	-	-	-	-	-	3	-
	Bohumír Zeman	Czechoslovakia	3		-	-	-	-	-	-	-	-	3
39	Roberto Grigis	Italy	2		-	2	-	-	-	-	-	-	-
	Egon Hirt	West Germany	2		-	-	-	-	-	2	-	-	-
41	Florian Beck	West Germany	1		-	-	1	-	-	-	-	-	-
	Daniel Fontaine	France	1		-	-	-	1	-	-	-	-	-

== Men's slalom team results ==
All points were shown including individuel deduction. bold indicate highest score - italics indicate race wins

Place	Country	Total points	4 (Italy)	7 (Italy)	11 (Germany)	15 (Austria)	18 (Switzerland)	22 (Germany)	28 (Czechoslovakia)	31 (Socialist Federal Republic of Yugoslavia)	33 (France)	Racers	Wins
1	United States	272	30	45	15	35	37	45	40	-	25	2	6
2	Sweden	239	28	21	25	**51**	26	-	31	29	28	4	2
3	Austria	191	16	18	20	11	8	35	32	35	16	6	0
4	Italy	179	26	21	33	28	13	21	13	17	7	8	0
5	Switzerland	86	2	16	5	2	-	18	1	16	26	4	0
6	Liechtenstein	76	13	-	19	9	25	-	-	-	10	2	0
7	Yugoslavia	70	4	-	4	-	11	3	11	25	12	2	1
8	Luxembourg	50	6	9	6	-	9	-	9	11	-	1	0
9	Norway	30	10	-	3	4	2	4	-	3	4	3	0
10	Bulgaria	17	-	1	7	-	3	-	4	2	-	1	0
11	France	16	-	-	-	1	4	10	-	-	1	3	0
12	Soviet Union	13	-	7	-	-	-	-	-	-	6	2	0
13	Japan	3	3	-	-	-	-	-	-	-	-	1	0
	West Germany	3	-	-	1	-	-	2	-	-	-	2	0
	Czechoslovakia	3	-	-	-	-	-	-	-	-	3	1	0

**Alpine Skiing World Cup**
**Men**

Overall | Downhill | Giant slalom | Slalom | Combined

**1982**
