= 1981 Alpine Skiing World Cup – Men's slalom =

1981 Men's slalom World Cup
Previous: 1980	Next: 1982

Men's slalom World Cup 1980/1981

== Calendar ==
Round	Race No	Place	Country	Date	Winner	Second	Third
1	2	Madonna di Campiglio	Italy	December 9, 1980	(Sweden) Ingemar Stenmark	(Liechtenstein) Paul Frommelt	(Socialist Federal Republic of Yugoslavia) Bojan Križaj
2	13	Garmisch-Partenkirchen	West Germany	January 11, 1981	(United States) Steve Mahre	(Bulgaria) Petar Popangelov	(Liechtenstein) Paul Frommelt
3	14	Oberstaufen	West Germany	January 13, 1981	(Liechtenstein) Paul Frommelt	(Sweden) Ingemar Stenmark	(United States) Steve Mahre
4	17	Kitzbühel	Austria	January 18, 1981	(Sweden) Ingemar Stenmark	(Soviet Union) Vladimir Andreev	(Austria) Christian Orlainsky
5	19	Wengen	Switzerland	January 25, 1981	(Socialist Federal Republic of Yugoslavia) Bojan Križaj	(Luxembourg) Marc Girardelli	(Sweden) Ingemar Stenmark
6	22	St. Anton	Austria	February 1, 1981	(Sweden) Ingemar Stenmark	(United States) Phil Mahre	(Norway) Jarle Halsnes
7	25	Oslo	Norway	February 8, 1981	(Sweden) Ingemar Stenmark	(Sweden) Bengt Fjällberg	(Soviet Union) Vladimir Andreev
8	28	Åre	Sweden	February 15, 1981	(United States) Phil Mahre	(Sweden) Ingemar Stenmark	(Austria) Franz Gruber
9	33	Furano	Japan	March 15, 1981	(United States) Phil Mahre	(Socialist Federal Republic of Yugoslavia) Bojan Križaj	(Sweden) Ingemar Stenmark
10	35	Borovets	Bulgaria	March 25, 1981	(Soviet Union) Aleksandr Zhirov	(United States) Steve Mahre	(United States) Phil Mahre

== Final point standings ==
In men's slalom World Cup 1980/81 the best 5 results count. Deductions are given in ().

Place	Name	Country	Total points	Deduction	2 (Italy)	13 (Germany)	14 (Germany)	17 (Austria)	19 (Switzerland)	22 (Austria)	25 (Norway)	28 (Sweden)	33 (Japan)	35 (Bulgaria)
1	Ingemar Stenmark	Sweden	120	(61)	25	-	20	25	(15)	25	25	(20)	(15)	(11)
2	Phil Mahre	United States	97	(23)	-	(6)	12	-	(5)	20	(12)	25	25	15
3	Bojan Križaj	Yugoslavia	80	(10)	15	12	(4)	-	25	8	-	-	20	(6)
	Steve Mahre	United States	80	(9)	-	25	15	-	(9)	-	10	-	10	20
5	Paul Frommelt	Liechtenstein	77	(7)	20	15	25	-	(7)	-	9	8	-	-
6	Aleksandr Zhirov	Soviet Union	70	(10)	-	-	10	(7)	12	(3)	11	-	12	25
7	Vladimir Andreev	Soviet Union	62	(9)	-	(4)	5	20	-	12	15	10	(5)	-
8	Piero Gros	Italy	48	(7)	9	11	9	-	(3)	-	8	11	(2)	(2)
9	Stig Strand	Sweden	46	(23)	11	9	(1)	10	9	7	(6)	(7)	(6)	(3)
10	Bengt Fjällberg	Sweden	45		-	-	-	3	-	-	20	12	-	10
	Jarle Halsnes	Norway	45	(6)	-	-	-	-	6	15	7	(6)	8	9
	Franz Gruber	Austria	45	(5)	7	-	7	-	(1)	(4)	-	15	9	7
13	Christian Orlainsky	Austria	44		5	-	11	15	10	-	3	-	-	-
14	Paolo De Chiesa	Italy	43	(4)	10	-	6	-	11	9	(4)	-	7	-
15	Marc Girardelli	Luxembourg	40		2	5	-	5	20	-	-	-	-	8
16	Joël Gaspoz	Switzerland	31		8	-	-	11	4	-	-	5	3	-
17	Andreas Wenzel	Liechtenstein	28		-	-	-	-	-	-	1	4	11	12
18	Petar Popangelov	Bulgaria	24		-	20	-	-	-	-	-	4	-	-
19	Bruno Nöckler	Italy	23		-	8	-	-	-	5	5	-	-	5
20	Peter Mally	Italy	16		12	-	-	-	-	-	-	-	4	-
21	Roberto Grigis	Italy	15		3	-	-	12	-	-	-	-	-	-
22	Toshihiro Kaiwa	Japan	14	(1)	1	-	-	3	2	6	-	2	(1)	-
23	Wolfram Ortner	Austria	11		-	-	-	-	-	11	-	-	-	-
	Jacques Lüthy	Switzerland	11		-	-	-	-	-	2	-	9	-	-
	Odd Sørli	Norway	11		-	-	-	-	-	10	-	-	-	1
26	Christian Neureuther	West Germany	10		-	10	-	-	-	-	-	-	-	-
	Jože Kuralt	Yugoslavia	10		-	3	3	4	-	-	-	-	-	-
	John Buxman	United States	10		-	-	-	8	-	-	2	-	-	-
	Lars-Göran Halvarsson	Sweden	10		-	-	-	9	-	-	-	1	-	-
30	Hans Enn	Austria	8		-	-	8	-	-	-	-	-	-	-
31	Frank Wörndl	West Germany	7		-	7	-	-	-	-	-	-	-	-
32	Didier Bouvet	France	6		6	-	-	-	-	-	-	-	-	-
	Kurt Gubser	Switzerland	6		-	-	-	6	-	-	-	-	-	-
34	Marco Tonazzi	Italy	4		4	-	-	-	-	-	-	-	-	-
	Patrick Lamotte	France	4		-	-	-	-	-	-	-	-	-	4
36	Michel Canac	France	2		-	2	-	-	-	-	-	-	-	-
	Klaus Heidegger	Austria	2		-	-	2	-	-	-	-	-	-	-
38	Florian Beck	West Germany	1		-	1	-	-	-	-	-	-	-	-
	Helmut Gstrein	Austria	1		-	-	-	1	-	-	-	-	-	-
	Paul Arne Skajem	Norway	1		-	-	-	-	-	1	-	-	-	-

== Men's slalom team results ==
All points were shown including individual deduction. bold indicate highest score - italics indicate race wins

Place	Country	Total points	2 (Italy)	13 (Germany)	14 (Germany)	17 (Austria)	19 (Switzerland)	22 (Austria)	25 (Norway)	28 (Sweden)	33 (Japan)	35 (Bulgaria)	Racers	Wins
1	Sweden	305	36	9	21	47	24	32	**51**	40	21	24	4	4
2	United States	219	-	31	27	8	14	20	24	25	35	35	3	3
3	Italy	160	38	19	15	12	14	14	17	11	13	7	6	0
4	Soviet Union	151	-	4	15	27	12	15	26	10	17	25	2	1
5	Austria	116	12	-	28	16	11	15	3	15	9	7	6	0
6	Liechtenstein	112	20	15	25	-	7	-	10	12	11	12	2	1
7	Yugoslavia	100	15	15	7	4	25	8	-	-	20	6	2	1
8	Norway	63	-	-	-	-	6	26	7	6	8	10	3	0
9	Switzerland	48	8	-	-	17	4	2	-	14	3	-	3	0
10	Luxembourg	40	2	5	-	5	20	-	-	-	-	8	1	0
11	Bulgaria	24	-	20	-	-	-	-	-	4	-	-	1	0
12	West Germany	18	-	18	-	-	-	-	-	-	-	-	3	0
13	Japan	15	1	-	-	3	2	6	-	2	1	-	1	0
14	France	12	6	2	-	-	-	-	-	-	-	4	3	0

**Alpine Skiing World Cup**
**Men**

Overall | Downhill | Giant slalom | Slalom | Combined

**1981**
