= Alpine skiing at the 1980 Winter Olympics – Men's giant slalom =

Men's giant slalom at the XIII Olympic Winter Games
- Alpine skiing
- Venue: Whiteface Mountain
- Date: February 18–19, 1980
- Competitors: 78 from 28 nations
- Winning time: 2:40.74

Medalists
| 1st place, gold medalist(s) | | Ingemar Stenmark | Sweden |
| 2nd place, silver medalist(s) | | Andreas Wenzel | Liechtenstein |
| 3rd place, bronze medalist(s) | | Hans Enn | Austria |

The Men's giant slalom competition of the Lake Placid 1980 Olympics was held at Whiteface Mountain.

The defending world champion was Ingemar Stenmark of Sweden, who was also the defending World Cup giant slalom champion and led the 1980 World Cup.

== Results ==
| Rank | Name | Country | Run 1 | Run 2 | Total | Difference |
|---|---|---|---|---|---|---|
| 1st place, gold medalist(s) | Ingemar Stenmark | Sweden | 1:20.49 | 1:20.25 | 2:40.74 | — |
| 2nd place, silver medalist(s) | Andreas Wenzel | Liechtenstein | 1:20.17 | 1:21.32 | 2:41.49 | +0.75 |
| 3rd place, bronze medalist(s) | Hans Enn | Austria | 1:20.31 | 1:22.20 | 2:42.51 | +1.77 |
| 4 | Bojan Križaj | Yugoslavia | 1:21.28 | 1:21.25 | 2:42.53 | +1.79 |
| 5 | Jacques Lüthy | Switzerland | 1:21.55 | 1:21.20 | 2:42.75 | +2.01 |
| 6 | Bruno Noeckler | Italy | 1:20.99 | 1:21.96 | 2:42.95 | +2.21 |
| 7 | Joël Gaspoz | Switzerland | 1:21.10 | 1:21.95 | 2:43.05 | +2.31 |
| 8 | Boris Strel | Yugoslavia | 1:21.45 | 1:21.79 | 2:43.24 | +2.50 |
| 9 | Aleksandr Shirov | Soviet Union | 1:21.53 | 1:22.54 | 2:44.07 | +3.33 |
| 10 | Phil Mahre | United States | 1:21.74 | 1:22.59 | 2:44.33 | +3.59 |
| 11 | Jarle Halsnes | Norway | 1:21.64 | 1:22.85 | 2:44.49 | +3.75 |
| 12 | Jure Franko | Yugoslavia | 1:21.50 | 1:23.13 | 2:44.63 | +3.89 |
| 13 | Christian Orlainsky | Austria | 1:21.92 | 1:22.78 | 2:44.70 | +3.96 |
| 14 | Jorge Pérez | Spain | 1:22.06 | 1:22.82 | 2:44.88 | +4.14 |
| 15 | Steve Mahre | United States | 1:21.86 | 1:23.08 | 2:44.94 | +4.20 |
| 15 | Vladimir Andreyev | Soviet Union | 1:22.19 | 1:22.75 | 2:44.94 | +4.20 |
| 17 | Frank Wörndl | West Germany | 1:21.70 | 1:23.88 | 2:45.58 | +4.84 |
| 18 | Anton Steiner | Austria | 1:21.93 | 1:23.83 | 2:45.76 | +5.02 |
| 19 | Bohumír Zeman | Czechoslovakia | 1:22.25 | 1:23.71 | 2:45.96 | +5.22 |
| 20 | Albert Burger | West Germany | 1:22.59 | 1:23.53 | 2:46.12 | +5.38 |
| 21 | Torsten Jakobsson | Sweden | 1:23.24 | 1:23.18 | 2:46.42 | +5.68 |
| 22 | Francisco Fernández Ochoa | Spain | 1:23.11 | 1:23.47 | 2:46.58 | +5.84 |
| 23 | Jorge García | Spain | 1:23.03 | 1:24.05 | 2:47.08 | +6.34 |
| 24 | Paul Arne Skajem | Norway | 1:23.12 | 1:23.99 | 2:47.11 | +6.37 |
| 25 | Odd Sørli | Norway | 1:22.87 | 1:24.43 | 2:47.30 | +6.56 |
| 26 | Leonhard Stock | Austria | 1:22.97 | 1:24.43 | 2:47.40 | +6.66 |
| 27 | Petar Popangelov | Bulgaria | 1:23.80 | 1:24.32 | 2:48.12 | +7.38 |
| 28 | Stig Strand | Sweden | 1:23.37 | 1:25.25 | 2:48.62 | +7.88 |
| 29 | Toshihiro Kaiwa | Japan | 1:24.29 | 1:24.49 | 2:48.78 | +8.04 |
| 30 | Lyudmil Tonchev | Bulgaria | 1:23.73 | 1:25.09 | 2:48.82 | +8.08 |
| 31 | Mitko Khadzhiev | Bulgaria | 1:25.27 | 1:25.15 | 2:50.42 | +9.68 |
| 32 | Khristo Angelov | Bulgaria | 1:25.97 | 1:26.81 | 2:52.78 | +12.04 |
| 33 | Alan Stewart | Great Britain | 1:25.53 | 1:27.42 | 2:52.95 | +12.21 |
| 34 | Sepp Ferstl | West Germany | 1:25.86 | 1:27.17 | 2:53.03 | +12.29 |
| 35 | Sigurður Jónsson | Iceland | 1:27.33 | 1:26.46 | 2:53.79 | +13.05 |
| 36 | Atsushi Sawada | Japan | 1:25.23 | 1:28.82 | 2:54.05 | +13.31 |
| 37 | Norberto Quiroga | Argentina | 1:27.16 | 1:28.49 | 2:55.65 | +14.91 |
| 38 | Rob McIntyre | Australia | 1:28.09 | 1:29.30 | 2:57.39 | +16.65 |
| 39 | Konrad Bartelski | Great Britain | 1:27.71 | 1:29.99 | 2:57.70 | +16.96 |
| 40 | Janez Flere | Argentina | 1:28.27 | 1:30.12 | 2:58.39 | +17.65 |
| 41 | Antony Guss | Australia | 1:29.26 | 1:29.53 | 2:58.79 | +18.05 |
| 42 | Carlos Font | Andorra | 1:29.47 | 1:29.79 | 2:59.26 | +18.52 |
| 43 | Ross Blyth | Great Britain | 1:29.21 | 1:30.89 | 3:00.10 | +19.36 |
| 44 | Guillermo Giumelli | Argentina | 1:30.62 | 1:31.64 | 3:02.26 | +21.52 |
| 45 | Patrick Toussaint | Andorra | 1:31.23 | 1:33.15 | 3:04.38 | +23.64 |
| 46 | Marcelo Martínez | Argentina | 1:31.17 | 1:34.41 | 3:05.58 | +24.84 |
| 47 | Didier Lamont | Belgium | 1:32.54 | 1:33.14 | 3:05.68 | +24.94 |
| 48 | Lazaros Arkhontopoulos | Greece | 1:36.32 | 1:39.91 | 3:16.23 | +35.49 |
| 49 | Hong In-Gi | South Korea | 1:39.30 | 1:41.50 | 3:20.80 | +40.06 |
| 50 | Piao Dongyi | China | 1:38.38 | 1:44.62 | 3:23.00 | +42.26 |
| 51 | Lazarakis Kekhagias | Greece | 1:42.16 | 1:41.24 | 3:23.40 | +42.66 |
| 52 | Giannis Stamatiou | Greece | 1:41.80 | 1:43.19 | 3:24.99 | +44.25 |
| 53 | Naji Heneine | Lebanon | 1:35.59 | 2:01.88 | 3:37.47 | +56.73 |
| 54 | Philippos Xenophontos | Cyprus | 1:49.52 | 1:48.57 | 3:38.09 | +57.35 |
| - | Valeri Tsyganov | Soviet Union | 1:21.22 | DNF | - | - |
| - | Alex Giorgi | Italy | 1:22.02 | DNF | - | - |
| - | Piero Gros | Italy | 1:22.15 | DNF | - | - |
| - | Cary Adgate | United States | 1:22.48 | DNF | - | - |
| - | Jože Kuralt | Yugoslavia | 1:22.68 | DNF | - | - |
| - | Miguel Font | Andorra | 1:30.93 | DNF | - | - |
| - | Stuart Blakely | New Zealand | 1:32.99 | DNF | - | - |
| - | Henri Mollin | Belgium | 1:33.02 | DNF | - | - |
| - | Andreas Pilavakis | Cyprus | 1:44.92 | DQ | - | |
| - | Victor Hugo Ascarrunz Jr. | Bolivia | DNF | - | - | - |
| - | Billy Farwig | Bolivia | DNF | - | - | - |
| - | Arturo Kinch | Costa Rica | DNF | - | - | - |
| - | Sami Rebez | Lebanon | DNF | - | - | - |
| - | Roddy Langmuir | Great Britain | DNF | - | - | - |
| - | Mark Vryenhoek | New Zealand | DNF | - | - | - |
| - | Scott Kendall | New Zealand | DNF | - | - | - |
| - | Scott Alan Sánchez | Bolivia | DNF | - | - | - |
| - | Björn Olgeirsson | Iceland | DNF | - | - | - |
| - | Osamu Kodama | Japan | DNF | - | - | - |
| - | Pete Patterson | United States | DNF | - | - | - |
| - | Mauro Bernardi | Italy | DNF | - | - | - |
| - | Peter Lüscher | Switzerland | DNF | - | - | - |
| - | Jean-Luc Fournier | Switzerland | DNF | - | - | - |
| - | Paul Frommelt | Liechtenstein | DQ | - | - | - |
