= 1980 Alpine Skiing World Cup – Men's giant slalom =

1980 Men's giant slalom World Cup
Previous: 1979	Next: 1981

Men's giant slalom World Cup 1979/1980

== Final point standings ==
In men's giant slalom World Cup 1979/80 the best 5 results count. Eight racers had a point deduction, which are given in brackets. Ingemar Stenmark won the cup with maximum points. He won his sixth Giant slalom World Cup in a row.

Place	Name	Country	Total points	Deduction	2 (France)	5 (Italy)	16 (Switzerland)	18 (United States)	20 (Canada)	23 (Germany)	25 (Italy)	26 (Austria)
1	Ingemar Stenmark	Sweden	125	(40)	25	25	25	-	25	(15)	25	(25)
2	Hans Enn	Austria	87	(9)	15	12	-	25	-	(9)	20	15
3	Jacques Lüthy	Switzerland	82	(28)	11	20	20	(8)	11	20	(9)	(11)
4	Andreas Wenzel	Liechtenstein	71	(2)	8	-	6	20	-	25	12	(2)
5	Joël Gaspoz	Switzerland	68	(5)	(3)	-	15	(2)	8	10	15	20
6	Bojan Križaj	Yugoslavia	56		20	15	-	-	-	2	10	9
7	Jarle Halsnes	Norway	51	(1)	9	7	(1)	15	9	11	-	-
8	Boris Strel	Yugoslavia	50	(5)	12	9	7	12	(5)	-	-	10
9	Phil Mahre	United States	43		2	-	-	7	20	6	8	-
10	Bohumír Zeman	Czechoslovakia	42		-	-	9	-	15	8	2	8
11	Peter Lüscher	Switzerland	39		-	10	-	5	-	-	12	12
12	Gerhard Jäger	Austria	35	(3)	-	8	-	11	(3)	5	4	7
13	Bruno Nöckler	Italy	32		-	6	12	9	2	-	3	-
14	Hannes Spiss	Austria	27		-	-	-	10	12	-	-	5
15	Odd Sørli	Norway	23		-	11	-	7	-	-	1	4
16	Torsten Jakobsson	Sweden	19		4	5	5	-	-	-	5	-
17	Jean-Luc Fournier	France	17		-	-	11	-	-	-	6	-
	Jože Kuralt	Yugoslavia	17		11	-	-	-	1	4	-	1
19	Albert Burger	West Germany	15		5	-	10	-	-	-	-	-
	Anton Steiner	Austria	15		-	3	-	-	-	12	-	-
21	Aleksandr Zhirov	Soviet Union	14		-	-	-	-	7	-	7	-
22	Christian Orlainsky	Austria	13		6	-	-	-	-	7	-	-
23	Piero Gros	Italy	10		-	2	8	-	-	-	-	-
	Jure Franko	Yugoslavia	10		-	-	-	-	10	-	-	-
	Leonhard Stock	Austria	10		-	-	-	1	6	-	-	3
26	Steve Mahre	United States	8		-	4	-	4	-	-	-	-
	Frank Wörndl	West Germany	8		7	-	-	-	-	1	-	-
28	Petar Popangelov	Bulgaria	6		-	-	-	-	-	-	-	6
29	Klaus Heidegger	Austria	4		-	-	4	-	-	-	-	-
	Alex Giorgi	Italy	4		-	-	-	-	4	-	-	-
	Tiziano Bieler	Italy	4		-	-	-	-	-	4	-	-
32	Cary Adgate	United States	3		-	-	3	-	-	-	-	-
	Marc Girardelli	Luxembourg	3		-	-	-	3	-	-	-	-
34	Werner Rhyner	Switzerland	2		-	-	2	-	-	-	-	-
35	Mauro Bernardi	Italy	1		1	-	-	-	-	-	-	-
	Franz Gruber	Austria	1		-	1	-	-	-	-	-	-

Alpine Skiing World Cup
Men

Overall | Downhill | Giant slalom | Slalom | Combined

1980
