= 1980–81 FIS Alpine Ski World Cup =

International sports competition

FIS Alpine Ski World Cup 1980/81
Discipline	Men	Women
Overall	(United States) Phil Mahre	(Switzerland) Marie-Theres Nadig
Downhill	(Austria) Harti Weirather	(Switzerland) Marie-Theres Nadig
Giant slalom	(Sweden) Ingemar Stenmark	(United States) Tamara McKinney
Slalom	(Sweden) Ingemar Stenmark	(Switzerland) Erika Hess
Combined	(United States) Phil Mahre	(Switzerland) Marie-Theres Nadig
Nations Cup	Austria	Switzerland
- Nations Cup overall: Switzerland

Competition
Locations	20	18
Individual	36	33

The 15th World Cup season began in December 1980 in France and concluded in March 1981 in Switzerland. Phil Mahre became the first American to win an overall title, the first of his three consecutive overall titles. Marie-Theres Nadig of Switzerland won the women's overall title.

Six-time ladies overall champion Annemarie Moser-Pröll of Austria, who first competed on the World Cup tour in 1969 at age 16, and four-time men's overall champion Gustav Thöni of Italy, who first competed on the World Cup tour in 1970 at age 18, both retired at the end of the 1980 season. After winning the overall title this year, Nadig, who had joined the tour in 1971, also retired. In part to stop this exodus of talent, the International Ski Federation decided to offer a new kind of license to its athletes, called a "B license", which permitted holders to receive sponsorship payments directly (instead of through their federation) but still retain their World Cup eligibility.

== Calendar ==
=== Men ===
Event key: DH – Downhill, SL – Slalom, GS – Giant slalom, KB – Combined, PS – Parallel slalom (Nations Cup ranking only)
Race	Season	Date	Place	Type	Winner	Second	Third
345	1	7 December 1980	(France) Val d'Isère	DH _{103}	(Austria) Uli Spieß	(Canada) Ken Read	(Canada) Steve Podborski
346	2	9 December 1980	(Italy) Madonna di Campiglio	SL _{116}	(Sweden) Ingemar Stenmark	(Liechtenstein) Paul Frommelt	(Socialist Federal Republic of Yugoslavia) Bojan Križaj
347	3	10 December 1980	(Italy) Madonna di Campiglio	GS _{110}	(Sweden) Ingemar Stenmark	(Soviet Union) Aleksandr Zhirov	(Austria) Gerhard Jäger
348	4	14 December 1980	(Italy) Val Gardena	DH _{104}	(Switzerland) Peter Müller	(Austria) Harti Weirather	(Canada) Steve Podborski
349	5	9 December 1980; 14 December 1980	(Italy) Madonna di Campiglio (SL) (Italy) Val Gardena (DH)	KB _{018}	(Switzerland) Peter Müller	(Austria) Leonhard Stock	(Liechtenstein) Andreas Wenzel
350	6	15 December 1980	(Italy) Val Gardena	DH _{105}	(Austria) Harti Weirather	(Austria) Uli Spieß	(Switzerland) Peter Müller
351	7	21 December 1980	(Switzerland) St. Moritz	DH _{106}	(Canada) Steve Podborski	(Austria) Peter Wirnsberger	(Switzerland) Peter Müller
352	8	4 January 1981	(Switzerland) Ebnat-Kappel	GS _{111}	(Austria) Christian Orlainsky	(Austria) Hans Enn	(Switzerland) Jean-Luc Fournier
353	9	7 December 1980; 4 January 1981	(France) Val d'Isère (DH) (Switzerland) Ebnat-Kappel (GS)	KB _{019}	(Liechtenstein) Andreas Wenzel	(Austria) Hans Enn	(United States) Phil Mahre
354	10	6 January 1981	(France) Morzine	GS _{112}	(Sweden) Ingemar Stenmark	(Switzerland) Joël Gaspoz	(Socialist Federal Republic of Yugoslavia) Bojan Križaj
355	11	10 January 1981	(West Germany) Garmisch	DH _{107}	(Canada) Steve Podborski	(Switzerland) Peter Müller	(Austria) Harti Weirather
356	12	6 January 1981; 10 January 1981	(France) Morzine (GS) (West Germany) Garmisch (DH)	KB _{020}	(United States) Phil Mahre	(Switzerland) Peter Müller	(Liechtenstein) Andreas Wenzel
357	13	11 January 1981	(West Germany) Garmisch	SL _{117}	(United States) Steve Mahre	(Bulgaria) Petar Popangelov	(Liechtenstein) Paul Frommelt
358	14	13 January 1981	(West Germany) Oberstaufen	SL _{118}	(Liechtenstein) Paul Frommelt	(Sweden) Ingemar Stenmark	(United States) Steve Mahre
359	15	17 January 1981	(Austria) Kitzbühel	DH _{108}	(Canada) Steve Podborski	(Switzerland) Peter Müller	(Austria) Peter Wirnsberger
360	16	13 January 1981; 17 January 1981	(West Germany) Oberstaufen (SL) (Austria) Kitzbühel (DH)	KB _{021}	(United States) Phil Mahre	(United States) Steve Mahre	(Sweden) Ingemar Stenmark
361	17	18 January 1981	(Austria) Kitzbühel	SL _{119}	(Sweden) Ingemar Stenmark	(Soviet Union) Vladimir Andreev	(Austria) Christian Orlainsky
362	18	24 January 1981	(Switzerland) Wengen	DH _{109}	(Switzerland) Toni Bürgler	(Austria) Harti Weirather	(Canada) Steve Podborski
363	19	25 January 1981	(Switzerland) Wengen	SL _{120}	(Socialist Federal Republic of Yugoslavia) Bojan Križaj	(Luxembourg) Marc Girardelli	(Sweden) Ingemar Stenmark
364	20	26 January 1981	(Switzerland) Adelboden	GS _{113}	(Sweden) Ingemar Stenmark	(Socialist Federal Republic of Yugoslavia) Boris Strel (Austria) Christian Orlainsky	
365	21	31 January 1981	(Austria) St. Anton	DH _{110}	(Austria) Harti Weirather	(Austria) Peter Wirnsberger	(Canada) Steve Podborski
366	22	1 February 1981	(Austria) St. Anton	SL _{121}	(Sweden) Ingemar Stenmark	(United States) Phil Mahre	(Norway) Jarle Halsnes
367	23	1 February 1981	(Austria) St. Anton	KB _{022}	(United States) Phil Mahre	(Italy) Herbert Plank	(West Germany) Herbert Renoth
368	24	3 February 1981	(Austria) Schladming	GS _{114}	(Sweden) Ingemar Stenmark	(Austria) Hans Enn	(Switzerland) Jean-Luc Fournier
369	25	8 February 1981	(Norway) Oslo	SL _{122}	(Sweden) Ingemar Stenmark	(Sweden) Bengt Fjällberg	(Soviet Union) Vladimir Andreev
370	26	11 February 1981	(Norway) Voss	GS _{115}	(Sweden) Ingemar Stenmark	(Soviet Union) Aleksandr Zhirov	(Italy) Bruno Nöckler
371	27	14 February 1981	(Sweden) Åre	GS _{116}	(Sweden) Ingemar Stenmark	(Soviet Union) Aleksandr Zhirov	(United States) Phil Mahre
372	28	15 February 1981	(Sweden) Åre	SL _{123}	(United States) Phil Mahre	(Sweden) Ingemar Stenmark	(Austria) Franz Gruber
373	29	5 March 1981	(United States) Aspen	DH _{111}	(Soviet Union) Valeri Tsyganov	(Austria) Harti Weirather	(Austria) Gerhard Pfaffenbichler
374	30	6 March 1981	(United States) Aspen	DH _{112}	(Austria) Harti Weirather	(Canada) Steve Podborski	(Switzerland) Franz Heinzer
375	31	7 March 1981	(United States) Aspen	GS _{117}	(United States) Phil Mahre	(Sweden) Ingemar Stenmark	(United States) Steve Mahre
376	32	14 March 1981	(Japan) Furano	GS _{118}	(Soviet Union) Aleksandr Zhirov	(Austria) Gerhard Jäger	(Sweden) Ingemar Stenmark
377	33	15 March 1981	(Japan) Furano	SL _{124}	(United States) Phil Mahre	(Socialist Federal Republic of Yugoslavia) Bojan Križaj	(Sweden) Ingemar Stenmark
378	34	24 March 1981	(Bulgaria) Borovets	GS _{119}	(Soviet Union) Aleksandr Zhirov	(Sweden) Ingemar Stenmark	(Switzerland) Joël Gaspoz
379	35	25 March 1981	(Bulgaria) Borovets	SL _{125}	(Soviet Union) Aleksandr Zhirov	(United States) Steve Mahre	(United States) Phil Mahre
380	36	28 March 1981	(Switzerland) Laax	GS _{120}	(Soviet Union) Aleksandr Zhirov	(United States) Phil Mahre	(Sweden) Ingemar Stenmark
Nations Cup		30 March 1981	(Switzerland) Laax	PS _{ncr}	(Sweden) Ingemar Stenmark	(Norway) Jarle Halsnes	(United States) Phil Mahre

=== Women ===
Event key: DH – Downhill, SL – Slalom, GS – Giant slalom, KB – Combined, PS – Parallel slalom (Nations Cup ranking only)
Race	Season	Date	Place	Type	Winner	Second	Third
327	1	3 December 1980	(France) Val d'Isère	DH _{090}	(Switzerland) Marie-Theres Nadig	(Canada) Kathy Kreiner	(West Germany) Irene Epple
328	2	4 December 1980	(France) Val d'Isère	GS _{105}	(West Germany) Irene Epple	(France) Perrine Pelen	(West Germany) Christa Kinshofer
329	3	4 December 1980	(France) Val d'Isère	KB _{018}	(Switzerland) Marie-Theres Nadig	(West Germany) Irene Epple	(West Germany) Christa Kinshofer
330	4	8 December 1980	(Italy) Limone Piemonte	GS _{106}	(Switzerland) Marie-Theres Nadig	(Italy) Daniela Zini	(France) Fabienne Serrat
331	5	12 December 1980	(Italy) Piancavallo	DH _{091}	(Switzerland) Marie-Theres Nadig	(Norway) Torill Fjeldstad	(Switzerland) Doris de Agostini
332	6	8 December 1980; 12 December 1980	(Italy) Limone Piemonte (GS) (Italy) Piancavallo (DH)	KB _{019}	(Switzerland) Marie-Theres Nadig	(France) Fabienne Serrat	(Switzerland) Erika Hess
333	7	13 December 1980	(Italy) Piancavallo	SL _{116}	(France) Fabienne Serrat	(Switzerland) Erika Hess	(Italy) Maria Rosa Quario
334	8	17 December 1980	(Austria) Altenmarkt	DH _{092}	(Czechoslovakia) Jana Šoltýsová	(Switzerland) Doris de Agostini	(Norway) Torill Fjeldstad
335	9	18 December 1980	(Austria) Altenmarkt	SL _{117}	(France) Perrine Pelen	(West Germany) Christa Kinshofer	(Italy) Daniela Zini
336	10	21 December 1980	(Italy) Bormio	SL _{118}	(France) Perrine Pelen	(Soviet Union) Nadezhda Patrikeyeva	(Switzerland) Erika Hess
337	11	8 January 1981	(West Germany) Pfronten	DH _{093}	(Austria) Cornelia Pröll	(Switzerland) Doris de Agostini	(United States) Holly Flanders
338	12	12 January 1981	(Austria) Schruns	DH _{094}	(Switzerland) Doris de Agostini	(United States) Cindy Nelson	(West Germany) Irene Epple
339	13	13 January 1981	(Austria) Schruns	SL _{119}	(Switzerland) Erika Hess	(Italy) Claudia Giordani	(United States) Tamara McKinney
340	14	19 January 1981	(Switzerland) Crans-Montana	DH _{095}	(Switzerland) Marie-Theres Nadig	(Switzerland) Doris de Agostini	(West Germany) Christa Kinshofer
341	15	21 January 1981	(Switzerland) Crans-Montana	SL _{120}	(Switzerland) Erika Hess	(United States) Christin Cooper	(Liechtenstein) Hanni Wenzel
342	16	21 January 1981	(Switzerland) Crans-Montana	KB _{020}	(West Germany) Christa Kinshofer	(Switzerland) Erika Hess	(United States) Christin Cooper
343	17	22 January 1981	(Switzerland) Haute-Nendaz	GS _{107}	(United States) Tamara McKinney	(Liechtenstein) Hanni Wenzel	(West Germany) Irene Epple
344	18	24 January 1981	(France) Les Gets	GS _{108}	(United States) Tamara McKinney	(West Germany) Christa Kinshofer	(Liechtenstein) Hanni Wenzel
345	19	28 January 1981	(France) Megève	DH _{096}	(Switzerland) Doris de Agostini	(Switzerland) Marie-Theres Nadig	(Norway) Torill Fjeldstad
346	20	24 January 1981; 28 January 1981	(France) Les Gets (GS) (France) Megève (DH)	KB _{021}	(Liechtenstein) Hanni Wenzel	(United States) Tamara McKinney	(Switzerland) Marie-Theres Nadig
347	21	29 January 1981	(France) Megève	DH _{097}	(Switzerland) Marie-Theres Nadig	(Switzerland) Doris de Agostini	(Austria) Cornelia Pröll
348	22	31 January 1981	(Switzerland) Les Diablerets	SL _{121}	(Switzerland) Erika Hess	(United States) Christin Cooper	(Italy) Daniela Zini
349	23	3 February 1981	(West Germany) Zwiesel	SL _{122}	(Switzerland) Erika Hess	(Italy) Daniela Zini	(United States) Christin Cooper
350	24	4 February 1981	(West Germany) Zwiesel	GS _{109}	(West Germany) Maria Epple	(West Germany) Christa Kinshofer	(United States) Tamara McKinney
351	25	8 February 1981	(Austria) Haus im Ennstal	DH _{098}	(Canada) Gerry Sorensen	(West Germany) Irene Epple	(Austria) Cornelia Pröll
352	26	3 February 1981; 8 February 1981	(West Germany) Zwiesel (SL) (Austria) Haus im Ennstal (DH)	KB _{022}	(Liechtenstein) Hanni Wenzel	(Switzerland) Maria Walliser	(United States) Christin Cooper
353	27	10 February 1981	(Socialist Federal Republic of Yugoslavia) Maribor	GS _{110}	(Switzerland) Marie-Theres Nadig	(West Germany) Maria Epple	(West Germany) Irene Epple
354	28	6 March 1981	(United States) Aspen	DH _{099}	(Austria) Elisabeth Kirchler	(West Germany) Regine Mösenlechner	(United States) Cindy Nelson
355	29	8 March 1981	(United States) Aspen	GS _{111}	(United States) Tamara McKinney	(Switzerland) Erika Hess	(Italy) Wanda Bieler
356	30	13 March 1981	(Japan) Furano	GS _{112}	(Switzerland) Marie-Theres Nadig	(Liechtenstein) Hanni Wenzel	(United States) Christin Cooper
357	31	15 March 1981	(Japan) Furano	SL _{123}	(Switzerland) Erika Hess	(United States) Christin Cooper	(West Germany) Maria Epple
358	32	24 March 1981	(Switzerland) Wangs-Pizol	SL _{124}	(Switzerland) Erika Hess	(Italy) Daniela Zini	(Switzerland) Maria Walliser
359	33	25 March 1981	(Switzerland) Wangs-Pizol	GS _{113}	(Switzerland) Erika Hess	(United States) Christin Cooper	(Liechtenstein) Hanni Wenzel
Nations Cup		30 March 1981	(Switzerland) Laax	PS _{ncp}	(United States) Tamara McKinney	(West Germany) Traudl Hächer	(Liechtenstein) Hanni Wenzel

== Men ==
=== Overall ===
see complete table

In men's overall World Cup 1980/81 the best five downhills, best five giant slaloms, best five slaloms and best three combined count. 28 racers had a point deduction. Ingemar Stenmark had 156 points deduction and won 10 races. For the first time he tried to score points in combined and was able to collect 15 points - not enough to win the Overall World Cup.

Place	Name	Country	Total	DH	GS	SL	KB
1	Phil Mahre	United States	266	10	84	97	75
2	Ingemar Stenmark	Sweden	260	0	125	120	15
3	Aleksandr Zhirov	Soviet Union	185	0	115	70	0
4	Steve Mahre	United States	155	0	46	80	29
5	Peter Müller	Switzerland	140	95	0	0	45
6	Bojan Križaj	Yugoslavia	137	0	40	80	17
7	Andreas Wenzel	Liechtenstein	130	9	38	28	55
8	Harti Weirather	Austria	115	115	0	0	0
9	Steve Podborski	Canada	110	110	0	0	0
10	Christian Orlainsky	Austria	105	0	61	44	0
11	Joël Gaspoz	Switzerland	102	0	71	31	0
12	Leonhard Stock	Austria	97	43	34	0	20
13	Jarle Halsnes	Norway	95	0	50	45	0
14	Hans Enn	Austria	93	2	52	8	31
15	Jacques Lüthy	Switzerland	84	0	53	11	20
16	Bruno Nöckler	Italy	79	0	56	23	0
17	Paul Frommelt	Liechtenstein	77	0	0	77	0
18	Peter Wirnsberger	Austria	73	73	0	0	0
	Valeri Tsyganov	Soviet Union	73	55	1	0	17
20	Vladimir Andreev	Soviet Union	72	0	10	62	0

=== Downhill ===
see complete table

In men's downhill World Cup 1980/81 the best 5 results count. Six racers had a point deduction, which are given in brackets.

Place	Name	Country	Total	1 (France)	4 (Italy)	6 (Italy)	7 (Switzerland)	11 (Germany)	15 (Austria)	18 (Switzerland)	21 (Austria)	29 (United States)	30 (United States)
1	Harti Weirather	Austria	115	-	20	25	(10)	(15)	(11)	20	25	(20)	25
2	Steve Podborski	Canada	110	15	(15)	(6)	25	25	25	(15)	(15)	(6)	20
3	Peter Müller	Switzerland	95	-	25	15	15	20	20	-	-	(12)	(11)
4	Peter Wirnsberger	Austria	73	-	-	-	20	9	15	(6)	20	9	(3)
5	Uli Spieß	Austria	56	25	11	20	-	-	-	-	-	-	-
6	Valeri Tsyganov	Soviet Union	55	3	-	-	12	-	4	11	-	25	-
	Toni Bürgler	Switzerland	55	-	-	7	-	11	-	25	-	-	12
8	Gerhard Pfaffenbichler	Austria	48	8	-	-	3	-	-	-	12	15	10
9	Helmut Höflehner	Austria	47	-	8	-	-	12	10	7	(5)	10	(5)
10	Franz Heinzer	Switzerland	43	-	-	-	-	-	8	4	9	7	15
	Leonhard Stock	Austria	43	-	10	11	11	-	-	-	-	5	6

=== Giant slalom ===
see complete table

In men's giant slalom World Cup 1980/81 the best 5 results count. 15 racers had a point deduction, which are given in brackets. Ingemar Stenmark won the cup with maximum points. He won his sixth Giant slalom World Cup! This record is still unbeaten!

Place	Name	Country	Total	3 (Italy)	8 (Switzerland)	10 (France)	20 (Switzerland)	24 (Austria)	26 (Norway)	27 (Sweden)	31 (United States)	32 (Japan)	34 (Bulgaria)	36 (Switzerland)
1	Ingemar Stenmark	Sweden	125	25	-	25	25	25	25	(25)	(20)	(15)	(20)	(15)
2	Aleksandr Zhirov	Soviet Union	115	20	-	(5)	-	(9)	20	(20)	(10)	25	25	25
3	Phil Mahre	United States	84	(8)	12	12	(8)	(10)	(10)	15	25	-	(11)	20
4	Joël Gaspoz	Switzerland	71	-	(7)	20	-	(4)	12	-	12	12	15	(3)
5	Jean-Luc Fournier	Switzerland	62	-	15	-	9	15	-	12	11	(3)	-	(6)
6	Christian Orlainsky	Austria	61	2	25	6	20	8	-	-	-	-	-	-
7	Bruno Nöckler	Italy	56	10	8	11	(6)	12	15	-	(8)	(6)	(3)	-
8	Jacques Lüthy	Switzerland	53	9	10	(7)	12	11	(6)	11	-	(8)	-	-
9	Hans Enn	Austria	52	12	20	-	-	20	-	-	-	-	-	-
10	Jarle Halsnes	Norway	50	-	(4)	-	11	(7)	11	8	-	-	12	8

=== Slalom ===
see complete table

In men's slalom World Cup 1980/81 the best 5 results count. 13 racers had a point deduction, which are given in brackets. Ingemar Stenmark won his seventh Slalom World Cup in a row! This record is still unbeaten!

Place	Name	Country	Total	2 (Italy)	13 (Germany)	14 (Germany)	17 (Austria)	19 (Switzerland)	22 (Austria)	25 (Norway)	28 (Sweden)	33 (Japan)	35 (Bulgaria)
1	Ingemar Stenmark	Sweden	120	25	-	20	25	(15)	25	25	(20)	(15)	(11)
2	Phil Mahre	United States	97	-	(6)	12	-	(5)	20	(12)	25	25	15
3	Bojan Križaj	Yugoslavia	80	15	12	(4)	-	25	8	-	-	20	(6)
	Steve Mahre	United States	80	-	25	15	-	(9)	-	10	-	10	20
5	Paul Frommelt	Liechtenstein	77	20	15	25	-	(7)	-	9	8	-	-
6	Aleksandr Zhirov	Soviet Union	70	-	-	10	(7)	12	(3)	11	-	12	25
7	Vladimir Andreev	Soviet Union	62	-	(4)	5	20	-	12	15	10	(5)	-
8	Piero Gros	Italy	48	9	11	9	-	(3)	-	8	11	(2)	(2)
9	Stig Strand	Sweden	46	11	9	(1)	10	9	7	(6)	(7)	(6)	(3)
10	Bengt Fjällberg	Sweden	45	-	-	-	3	-	-	20	12	-	10
	Jarle Halsnes	Norway	45	-	-	-	-	6	15	7	(6)	8	9
	Franz Gruber	Austria	45	7	-	7	-	(1)	(4)	-	15	9	7

=== Combined ===
see complete table

In men's combined World Cup 1980/81 all 5 results count.

Place	Name	Country	Total	5 (Italy)	9 (France) (Switzerland)	12 (France) (Germany)	16 (Germany) (Austria)	23 (Austria)
1	Phil Mahre	United States	102	12	15	25	25	25
2	Andreas Wenzel	Liechtenstein	55	15	25	15	-	-
3	Peter Müller	Switzerland	45	25	-	20	-	-
4	Hans Enn	Austria	31	11	20	-	-	-
5	Steve Mahre	United States	29	9	-	-	20	-
6	Siegfried Kerschbaumer	Italy	28	7	10	11	-	-
7	Leonhard Stock	Austria	20	20	-	11	-	-
	Jacques Lüthy	Switzerland	20	8	12	-	-	-
	Herbert Plank	Italy	20	-	-	-	-	20
	Even Hole	Norway	20	-	-	-	8	12

== Women ==
=== Overall ===
see complete table

In women's overall World Cup 1980/81 the best five downhills, best five giant slaloms, best five slaloms and best three combined count. 19 racers had a point deduction. Marie-Theres Nadig won 9 races.

Place	Name	Country	Total	DH	GS	SL	KB
1	Marie-Theres Nadig	Switzerland	289	120	97	7	65
2	Erika Hess	Switzerland	251	5	78	125	43
3	Hanni Wenzel	Liechtenstein	241	42	78	59	62
4	Christin Cooper	United States	198	2	69	86	41
5	Irene Epple	West Germany	181	71	78	1	31
6	Tamara McKinney	United States	176	0	102	52	22
	Perrine Pelen	France	176	0	60	81	35
8	Cindy Nelson	United States	168	60	48	29	31
9	Christa Kinshofer	West Germany	165	21	63	29	52
10	Fabienne Serrat	France	149	0	45	63	41
11	Daniela Zini	Italy	137	0	56	81	0
12	Maria Walliser	Switzerland	112	41	14	22	35
13	Doris de Agostini	Switzerland	110	110	0	0	0
14	Maria Epple	West Germany	102	0	71	31	0
15	Olga Charvátová	Czechoslovakia	84	7	31	25	21
16	Cornelia Pröll	Austria	78	78	0	0	0
17	Wanda Bieler	Italy	75	0	60	15	0
18	Maria Rosa Quario	Italy	64	0	29	35	0
19	Holly Flanders	United States	63	60	0	0	3
20	Torill Fjeldstad	Norway	62	62	0	0	0

=== Downhill ===
see complete table

In women's downhill World Cup 1980/81 the best 5 results count. Ten racers had a point deduction, which are given in brackets.

Place	Name	Country	Total	1 (France)	5 (Italy)	8 (Austria)	11 (Germany)	12 (Austria)	14 (Switzerland)	19 (France)	21 (France)	25 (Austria)	28 (United States)
1	Marie-Theres Nadig	Switzerland	120	25	25	-	(2)	-	25	20	25	(5)	(9)
2	Doris de Agostini	Switzerland	110	-	(15)	20	20	25	20	25	(20)	(12)	(10)
3	Cornelia Pröll	Austria	78	(9)	(10)	12	25	-	(3)	11	15	15	-
4	Irene Epple	West Germany	71	15	-	11	10	15	-	(10)	(3)	20	-
5	Torill Fjeldstad	Norway	62	-	20	15	-	-	-	15	2	10	-
6	Jana Šoltýsová	Czechoslovakia	61	(2)	(6)	25	7	8	12	(4)	9	-	-
7	Cindy Nelson	United States	60	-	(5)	(4)	11	20	7	(1)	7	-	15
	Holly Flanders	United States	60	-	9	(5)	15	-	(8)	12	12	(8)	12
9	Elisabeth Kirchler	Austria	42	-	-	-	5	-	5	-	-	7	25
	Hanni Wenzel	Liechtenstein	42	-	-	-	8	10	-	5	(4)	11	8
11	Maria Walliser	Switzerland	41	7	-	-	-	-	9	8	11	6	-
12	Gerry Sorensen	Canada	39	-	-	-	-	-	-	3	11	25	-

=== Giant slalom ===
see complete table

In women's giant slalom World Cup 1980/81 the best 5 results count. 12 racers had a point deduction, which are given in brackets.

Place	Name	Country	Total	1 (France)	4 (Italy)	17 (Switzerland)	18 (France)	24 (Germany)	27 (Socialist Federal Republic of Yugoslavia)	29 (United States)	30 (Japan)	33 (Switzerland)
1	Tamara McKinney	United States	102	(10)	-	25	25	15	(9)	25	12	-
2	Marie-Theres Nadig	Switzerland	97	11	25	11	(6)	(10)	25	-	25	-
3	Erika Hess	Switzerland	78	(6)	11	(2)	-	(2)	12	20	10	25
	Hanni Wenzel	Liechtenstein	78	-	-	20	15	8	(8)	(4)	20	15
	Irene Epple	West Germany	78	25	-	15	-	(5)	15	(8)	11	12
6	Maria Epple	West Germany	71	(1)	-	-	12	25	20	7	(6)	7
7	Christin Cooper	United States	69	-	(8)	12	-	11	11	(2)	15	20
8	Christa Kinshofer	West Germany	63	15	-	8	20	20	-	-	-	-
9	Wanda Bieler	Italy	60	-	12	10	11	12	-	15	-	(2)
	Perrine Pelen	France	60	20	10	(5)	9	9	(5)	12	-	-
11	Daniela Zini	Italy	56	8	20	9	10	-	-	9	-	-

=== Slalom ===
see complete table

In women's slalom World Cup 1980/81 the best 5 results count. Five racers had a point deduction, which are given in brackets. Erika Hess won six races in a row. She won the World Cup with maximum points.

Place	Name	Country	Total	7 (Italy)	9 (Austria)	10 (Italy)	13 (Austria)	15 (Switzerland)	22 (Switzerland)	23 (Germany)	31 (Japan)	32 (Switzerland)
1	Erika Hess	Switzerland	125	(20)	-	(15)	25	25	25	25	25	(25)
2	Christin Cooper	United States	86	11	(9)	(10)	(10)	20	20	15	20	-
3	Daniela Zini	Italy	81	-	15	-	11	(11)	15	20	(8)	20
	Perrine Pelen	France	81	10	25	25	-	-	11	(8)	(9)	10
5	Fabienne Serrat	France	63	25	11	10	-	7	10	(2)	(2)	(7)
6	Hanni Wenzel	Liechtenstein	59	-	-	-	12	15	-	10	10	12
7	Tamara McKinney	United States	52	5	-	-	15	-	9	-	12	11
8	Piera Macchi	Italy	51	-	12	-	8	8	12	-	11	-
9	Nadezhda Patrikeyeva	Soviet Union	46	12	7	20	-	-	1	-	6	-
10	Claudia Giordani	Italy	43	-	8	11	20	-	4	-	-	-

=== Combined ===
see complete table

In women's combined World Cup 1980/81 all 5 results count.

Place	Name	Country	Total	3 (France)	6 (Italy)	16 (Switzerland)	20 (France)	26 (Germany) (Austria)
1	Marie-Theres Nadig	Switzerland	86	25	25	9	15	12
2	Hanni Wenzel	Liechtenstein	62	-	-	12	25	25
3	Christa Kinshofer	West Germany	52	15	-	25	12	-
4	Erika Hess	Switzerland	51	8	15	20	-	8
5	Fabienne Serrat	France	50	11	20	10	9	-
6	Christin Cooper	United States	41	-	11	15	-	15
7	Cindy Nelson	United States	40	5	10	11	10	4
8	Perrine Pelen	France	35	12	12	-	11	-
	Maria Walliser	Switzerland	35	-	9	6	-	20
10	Irene Epple	West Germany	31	20	-	4	-	7

== Nations Cup ==
=== Overall ===
Place	Country	Total	Men	Ladies
1	Switzerland	1727	641	1086
2	United States	1429	596	833
3	Austria	1388	1064	324
4	Italy	777	350	427
5	West Germany	730	88	642
6	France	611	93	518
7	Sweden	553	553	0
8	Liechtenstein	521	217	304
9	Soviet Union	468	419	49
10	Canada	371	264	107
11	Yugoslavia	312	264	48
12	Norway	249	187	62
13	Czechoslovakia	174	16	158
14	Luxembourg	51	51	0
15	Japan	34	34	0
16	Bulgaria	24	24	0
17	Belgium	18	18	0
18	Ireland	7	7	0
19	Poland	2	0	2
20	Spain	1	0	1

=== Men ===
Place	Country	Total	DH	GS	SL	KB	Racers	Wins
1	Austria	1064	597	300	116	51	23	5
2	Switzerland	641	309	198	48	86	13	3
3	United States	596	55	180	219	142	8	7
4	Sweden	553	0	231	305	17	6	10
5	Soviet Union	419	81	170	151	17	4	5
6	Italy	350	44	98	160	48	11	0
7	Canada	264	264	0	0	0	5	3
	Yugoslavia	264	0	111	100	53	7	1
9	Liechtenstein	217	9	41	112	55	2	2
10	Norway	187	0	104	63	20	4	0
11	France	93	6	75	12	0	7	0
12	West Germany	88	21	5	18	44	9	0
13	Luxembourg	51	0	11	40	0	1	0
14	Japan	34	0	0	15	19	3	0
15	Bulgaria	24	0	0	24	0	1	0
16	Belgium	18	0	0	0	18	1	0
17	Czechoslovakia	16	0	0	0	16	2	0
18	Ireland	7	0	0	0	7	1	0

=== Women ===
Place	Country	Total	DH	GS	SL	KB	Racers	Wins
1	Switzerland	1086	392	239	256	199	13	18
2	United States	833	204	261	225	143	9	3
3	West Germany	642	156	275	80	131	10	3
4	France	518	105	138	190	85	9	3
5	Italy	427	0	167	260	0	9	0
6	Austria	324	258	23	25	18	16	2
7	Liechtenstein	304	46	99	89	70	3	2
8	Czechoslovakia	158	80	32	25	21	2	1
9	Canada	107	82	5	0	20	4	1
10	Norway	62	62	0	0	0	1	0
11	Soviet Union	49	0	3	46	0	1	0
12	Yugoslavia	48	0	0	45	3	5	0
13	Poland	2	0	0	2	0	1	0
14	Spain	1	0	1	0	0	1	0
