= 1980 Alpine Skiing World Cup – Men's slalom =

1980 Men's slalom World Cup
| Previous: 1979 | Next: 1981 |

Men's slalom World Cup 1979/1980

== Final point standings ==
In men's slalom World Cup 1979/80 the best 5 results count. Six racers had a point deduction, which are given in brackets. Ingemar Stenmark won the cup with maximum points. He won his sixth Slalom World Cup in a row.

| Place | Name | Country | Total points | Deduction | 4 (Italy) | 9 (Germany) | 12 (Austria) | 15 (Switzerland) | 17 (France) | 19 (United States) | 24 (Italy) | 27 (Austria) |
|---|---|---|---|---|---|---|---|---|---|---|---|---|
| 1 | Ingemar Stenmark | Sweden | 125 | (38) | 25 | (15) | (3) | (20) | 25 | 25 | 25 | 25 |
| 2 | Bojan Križaj | Yugoslavia | 88 | (19) | 20 | (8) | 12 | 25 | 20 | 11 | - | (11) |
| 3 | Christian Neureuther | West Germany | 69 | (7) | (6) | (1) | 20 | 7 | - | 20 | 10 | 12 |
| 4 | Petar Popangelov | Bulgaria | 64 | | - | 25 | - | - | 12 | 12 | - | 15 |
| 5 | Aleksandr Zhirov | Soviet Union | 57 | | - | 20 | - | 5 | 3 | 9 | 20 | - |
| 6 | Christian Orlainsky | Austria | 55 | | - | 7 | - | 9 | 15 | - | 15 | 9 |
| 7 | Jacques Lüthy | Switzerland | 53 | (2) | 10 | - | 15 | 10 | 8 | - | (2) | 10 |
| 8 | Andreas Wenzel | Liechtenstein | 51 | | 11 | 9 | 25 | - | 6 | - | - | - |
| 9 | Anton Steiner | Austria | 49 | (3) | 8 | (3) | - | 12 | 11 | 10 | - | 8 |
| 10 | Paul Frommelt | Liechtenstein | 45 | | 15 | 4 | - | 15 | - | - | 9 | 2 |
| 11 | Steve Mahre | United States | 44 | | 7 | - | - | - | - | 6 | 11 | 20 |
| 12 | Phil Mahre | United States | 39 | (3) | - | 12 | - | 8 | 9 | 7 | 3 | (3) |
| 13 | Hans Enn | Austria | 25 | | 3 | 5 | 10 | - | - | - | - | 7 |
| 14 | Klaus Heidegger | Austria | 24 | | - | - | - | 2 | - | 15 | 7 | - |
| 15 | Mauro Bernardi | Italy | 21 | | 12 | - | 5 | - | - | - | 4 | - |
| | Paolo De Chiesa | Italy | 21 | | - | - | 7 | - | 4 | - | 5 | 5 |
| 17 | Franz Gruber | Austria | 20 | | 9 | - | - | 4 | 7 | - | - | - |
| 18 | Piero Gros | Italy | 18 | | - | - | 8 | - | 10 | - | - | - |
| | Vladimir Andreyev | Soviet Union | 18 | | - | 2 | 4 | 11 | 1 | - | - | - |
| | Gustav Thöni | Italy | 18 | | - | 11 | 3 | - | - | 3 | - | 1 |
| 21 | Stig Strand | Sweden | 16 | | 4 | - | 6 | - | 6 | - | - | - |
| 22 | Frank Wörndl | West Germany | 15 | | - | - | - | 6 | - | - | 9 | - |
| 23 | Paul Arne Skajem | Norway | 13 | | - | - | 9 | - | - | 4 | - | - |
| 24 | Bruno Nöckler | Italy | 12 | | - | - | 11 | 1 | - | - | - | - |
| | Karl Trojer | Italy | 12 | | - | - | - | - | - | - | 12 | - |
| 26 | Bohumír Zeman | Czechoslovakia | 11 | | - | - | - | 3 | - | 8 | - | - |
| | Peter Lüscher | Switzerland | 11 | | 2 | - | - | - | - | 5 | - | 4 |
| 28 | Osamu Kodama | Japan | 10 | | - | 10 | - | - | - | - | - | - |
| 29 | Peter Mally | Italy | 7 | | 5 | - | - | - | 2 | - | - | - |
| | Jože Kuralt | Yugoslavia | 7 | | - | 6 | - | - | - | - | 1 | - |
| 31 | Lars-Göran Halvarsson | Sweden | 6 | | - | - | - | - | - | - | 6 | - |
| | Martial Donnet | Switzerland | 6 | | - | - | - | - | - | - | - | 6 |
| 33 | Jostein Masdal | Norway | 2 | | - | - | - | - | - | 2 | - | - |
| 34 | Florian Beck | West Germany | 1 | | 1 | - | - | - | - | - | - | - |
| | Peter Aellig | Switzerland | 1 | | - | - | 1 | - | - | - | - | - |
| | Joël Gaspoz | Switzerland | 1 | | - | - | - | - | - | 1 | - | - |

Alpine Skiing World Cup
Men

Overall | Downhill | Giant slalom | Slalom | Combined

1980
