= 1979–80 FIS Alpine Ski World Cup =

International sports competition

FIS Alpine Ski World Cup 1979/80
Discipline	Men	Women
Overall	(Liechtenstein) Andreas Wenzel	(Liechtenstein) Hanni Wenzel
Downhill	(Switzerland) Peter Müller	(Switzerland) Marie-Theres Nadig
Giant slalom	(Sweden) Ingemar Stenmark	(Liechtenstein) Hanni Wenzel
Slalom	(Sweden) Ingemar Stenmark	(France) Perrine Pelen
Combined	(United States) Phil Mahre	(Liechtenstein) Hanni Wenzel
Nations Cup	Austria	Austria; Switzerland
- Nations Cup overall: Austria

Competition
Locations	15	14
Individual	27	28

The 14th World Cup season began in December 1979 in France and concluded in March 1980 in Austria.

Andreas Wenzel of Liechtenstein edged out Ingemar Stenmark of Sweden for the men's overall title. Wenzel's older sister, Hanni Wenzel, won the women's overall title for the second time, making them the first sibling combination to both win the overall World Cup title (as of 2017, joined only by Janica and Ivica Kostelić from Croatia) and the only one to win in the same year.

The World Cup race scoring system was revised again, the third different system used in less than a year. The new system was a "Top 15" points system (ranging from 25 points for first, 20 for second, 15 for third, 12 for fourth, and 1 point less for each subsequent position down to 1 point for 15th). This system remained in effect through 1991. The season championship for the "Combined" discipline also returned this year, for the first time since 1976.

A break in the schedule in February was for the 1980 Winter Olympics in Lake Placid, New York, U.S.A. This was the final time that the Winter Olympics also served as the FIS Alpine World Ski Championships; the World Championships would become a separate competition held in odd-numbered years beginning in 1985.

== Calendar ==
=== Men ===
Event key: DH – Downhill, SL – Slalom, GS – Giant slalom, KB – Combined, PS – Parallel slalom (Nations Cup ranking only)
Race	Season	Date	Place	Type	Winner	Second	Third
318	1	7 December 1979	(France) Val d'Isère	DH _{096}	(Austria) Peter Wirnsberger	(Italy) Herbert Plank	(Norway) Erik Håker
319	2	8 December 1979	(France) Val d'Isère	GS _{102}	(Sweden) Ingemar Stenmark	(Socialist Federal Republic of Yugoslavia) Bojan Križaj	(Austria) Hans Enn
320	3	8 December 1979	(France) Val d'Isère	KB _{014}	(United States) Phil Mahre	(United States) Steve Mahre	(France) Michel Vion
321	4	11 December 1979	(Italy) Madonna di Campiglio	SL _{108}	(Sweden) Ingemar Stenmark	(Socialist Federal Republic of Yugoslavia) Bojan Križaj	(Liechtenstein) Paul Frommelt
322	5	12 December 1979	(Italy) Madonna di Campiglio	GS _{103}	(Sweden) Ingemar Stenmark	(Switzerland) Jacques Lüthy	(Socialist Federal Republic of Yugoslavia) Bojan Križaj
323	6	16 December 1979	(Italy) Val Gardena	DH _{097}	(Switzerland) Peter Müller	(Norway) Erik Håker	(Austria) Werner Grissmann
324	7	11 December 1979; 16 December 1979	(Italy) Madonna di Campiglio (SL) (Italy) Val Gardena (DH)	KB _{015}	(Switzerland) Peter Lüscher	(Liechtenstein) Andreas Wenzel	(Austria) Anton Steiner
325	8	6 January 1980	(France) Pra-Loup	DH _{098}	(Switzerland) Peter Müller	(Italy) Herbert Plank	(Norway) Erik Håker
326	9	8 January 1980	(West Germany) Lenggries	SL _{109}	(Bulgaria) Petar Popangelov	(Soviet Union) Aleksandr Zhirov	(Sweden) Ingemar Stenmark
327	10	12 January 1980	(Austria) Kitzbühel	DH _{099}	(Canada) Ken Read	(Austria) Harti Weirather	(Italy) Herbert Plank
328	11	8 January 1980; 12 January 1980	(West Germany) Lenggries (SL) (Austria) Kitzbühel (DH)	KB _{016}	(Liechtenstein) Andreas Wenzel	(Austria) Anton Steiner	(United States) Phil Mahre
329	12	13 January 1980	(Austria) Kitzbühel	SL _{110}	(Liechtenstein) Andreas Wenzel	(West Germany) Christian Neureuther	(Switzerland) Jacques Lüthy
330	13	18 January 1980	(Switzerland) Wengen	DH _{100}	(Canada) Ken Read	(Austria) Josef Walcher	(Austria) Peter Wirnsberger
331	14	19 January 1980	(Switzerland) Wengen	DH _{101}	(Switzerland) Peter Müller	(Canada) Ken Read	(Canada) Steve Podborski
332	15	20 January 1980	(Switzerland) Wengen	SL _{111}	(Socialist Federal Republic of Yugoslavia) Bojan Križaj	(Sweden) Ingemar Stenmark	(Liechtenstein) Paul Frommelt
333	16	21 January 1980	(Switzerland) Adelboden	GS _{104}	(Sweden) Ingemar Stenmark	(Switzerland) Jacques Lüthy	(Switzerland) Joël Gaspoz
334	17	27 January 1980	(France) Chamonix	SL _{122}	(Sweden) Ingemar Stenmark	(Socialist Federal Republic of Yugoslavia) Bojan Križaj	(Austria) Christian Orlainsky
1980 Winter Olympics (14–23 February)
335	18	26 February 1980	(United States) Waterville Valley	GS _{105}	(Austria) Hans Enn	(Liechtenstein) Andreas Wenzel	(Norway) Jarle Halsnes
336	19	27 February 1980	(United States) Waterville Valley	SL _{113}	(Sweden) Ingemar Stenmark	(West Germany) Christian Neureuther	(Austria) Klaus Heidegger
337	20	1 March 1980	(Canada) Mt. St. Anne	GS _{106}	(Sweden) Ingemar Stenmark	(United States) Phil Mahre	(Czechoslovakia) Bohumir Zeman
338	21	4 March 1980	(Canada) Lake Louise	DH _{102}	(Italy) Herbert Plank	(Austria) Harti Weirather	(Austria) Werner Grissmann
339	22	27 January 1980; 4 March 1980	(France) Chamonix (SL) (Canada) Lake Louise (DH)	KB _{017}	(Austria) Anton Steiner	(Liechtenstein) Andreas Wenzel	(United States) Phil Mahre
340	23	8 March 1980	(West Germany) Oberstaufen	GS _{107}	(Liechtenstein) Andreas Wenzel	(Switzerland) Jacques Lüthy	(Sweden) Ingemar Stenmark
341	24	10 March 1980	(Italy) Cortina d'Ampezzo	SL _{114}	(Sweden) Ingemar Stenmark	(Soviet Union) Aleksandr Zhirov	(Austria) Christian Orlainsky
342	25	11 March 1980	(Italy) Cortina d'Ampezzo	GS _{108}	(Sweden) Ingemar Stenmark	(Austria) Hans Enn	(Switzerland) Joël Gaspoz
343	26	13 March 1980	(Austria) Saalbach	GS _{109}	(Sweden) Ingemar Stenmark	(Switzerland) Joël Gaspoz	(Austria) Hans Enn
344	27	15 March 1980	(Austria) Saalbach	SL _{115}	(Sweden) Ingemar Stenmark	(United States) Steve Mahre	(Bulgaria) Petar Popangelov
Nations Cup		16 March 1980	(Austria) Saalbach	PS _{ncr}	(Austria) Anton Steiner	(Sweden) Ingemar Stenmark	(Norway) Jarle Halsnes

=== Women ===
Event key: DH – Downhill, SL – Slalom, GS – Giant slalom, KB – Combined, PS – Parallel slalom (Nations Cup ranking only)
Race	Season	Date	Place	Type	Winner	Second	Third
299	1	5 December 1979	(France) Val d'Isère	DH _{083}	(Switzerland) Marie-Theres Nadig	(United States) Cindy Nelson	(Canada) Laurie Graham
300	2	6 December 1979	(France) Val d'Isère	GS _{097}	(Switzerland) Marie-Theres Nadig	(France) Perrine Pelen	(Switzerland) Erika Hess
301	3	6 December 1979	(France) Val d'Isère	KB _{014}	(Switzerland) Marie-Theres Nadig	(Liechtenstein) Hanni Wenzel	(Austria) Annemarie Moser-Pröll
302	4	8 December 1979	(Italy) Limone Piemonte	GS _{098}	(Liechtenstein) Hanni Wenzel	(Switzerland) Erika Hess	(France) Fabienne Serrat
303	5	14 December 1979	(Italy) Piancavallo	DH _{084}	(Switzerland) Marie-Theres Nadig	(Austria) Annemarie Moser-Pröll	(Czechoslovakia) Jana Šoltýsová
304	6	8 December 1979; 14 December 1979	(Italy) Limone Piemonte (GS) (Italy) Piancavallo (DH)	KB _{015}	(Liechtenstein) Hanni Wenzel	(Austria) Annemarie Moser-Pröll	(France) Fabienne Serrat
305	7	15 December 1979	(Italy) Piancavallo	SL _{107}	(Austria) Annemarie Moser-Pröll	(France) Perrine Pelen	(Italy) Claudia Giordani
306	8	19 December 1979	(Austria) Zell am See	DH _{085}	(Switzerland) Marie-Theres Nadig	(Czechoslovakia) Jana Šoltýsová	(Austria) Annemarie Moser-Pröll
307	9	6 January 1980	(West Germany) Pfronten	DH _{086}	(Austria) Annemarie Moser-Pröll	(Switzerland) Marie-Theres Nadig	(Liechtenstein) Hanni Wenzel
308	10	7 January 1980	(West Germany) Pfronten	DH _{087}	(Switzerland) Marie-Theres Nadig	(Austria) Cornelia Pröll	(Switzerland) Doris de Agostini
309	11	9 January 1980	(West Germany) Berchtesgaden	SL _{108}	(France) Perrine Pelen	(Italy) Claudia Giordani	(Italy) Daniela Zini
310	12	10 January 1980	(West Germany) Berchtesgaden	GS _{099}	(Liechtenstein) Hanni Wenzel	(France) Perrine Pelen	(Italy) Claudia Giordani
311	13	15 January 1980	(Switzerland) Arosa	DH _{088}	(Switzerland) Marie-Theres Nadig	(Austria) Annemarie Moser-Pröll	(Liechtenstein) Hanni Wenzel
312	14	9 January 1980; 15 January 1980	(West Germany) Berchtesgaden (SL) (Switzerland) Arosa (DH)	KB _{016}	(Austria) Annemarie Moser-Pröll	(Liechtenstein) Hanni Wenzel	(Austria) Ingrid Eberle
313	15	16 January 1980	(Switzerland) Arosa	GS _{100}	(Liechtenstein) Hanni Wenzel	(Switzerland) Marie-Theres Nadig	(France) Perrine Pelen
314	16	20 January 1980	(Austria) Bad Gastein	DH _{089}	(Switzerland) Marie-Theres Nadig	(Austria) Annemarie Moser-Pröll	(Liechtenstein) Hanni Wenzel
315	17	21 January 1980	(Austria) Bad Gastein	SL _{109}	(Liechtenstein) Hanni Wenzel	(France) Perrine Pelen	(Switzerland) Erika Hess
316	18	21 January 1980	(Austria) Bad Gastein	KB _{017}	(Liechtenstein) Hanni Wenzel	(Austria) Annemarie Moser-Pröll	(United States) Cindy Nelson
317	19	23 January 1980	(Socialist Federal Republic of Yugoslavia) Maribor	SL _{110}	(Liechtenstein) Hanni Wenzel	(France) Perrine Pelen	(Austria) Annemarie Moser-Pröll
318	20	25 January 1980	(France) St. Gervais	SL _{111}	(France) Perrine Pelen	(Austria) Annemarie Moser-Pröll	(Italy) Daniela Zini
319	21	26 January 1980	(France) St. Gervais	GS _{101}	(Liechtenstein) Hanni Wenzel	(France) Perrine Pelen	(Switzerland) Marie-Theres Nadig
1980 Winter Olympics (14–23 February)
320	22	28 February 1980	(United States) Waterville Valley	GS _{102}	(Liechtenstein) Hanni Wenzel	(West Germany) Maria Epple	(West Germany) Irene Epple
321	23	29 February 1980	(United States) Waterville Valley	SL _{112}	(France) Perrine Pelen	(Soviet Union) Nadezhda Patrikeyeva	(Liechtenstein) Hanni Wenzel
322	24	2 March 1980	(Canada) Mt. St. Anne	GS _{103}	(Switzerland) Marie-Theres Nadig	(West Germany) Irene Epple	(Liechtenstein) Hanni Wenzel
323	25	8 March 1980	(Czechoslovakia) Vysoké Tatry	SL _{113}	(France) Perrine Pelen	(France) Fabienne Serrat	(United States) Tamara McKinney
324	26	9 March 1980	(Czechoslovakia) Vysoké Tatry	SL _{114}	(Italy) Daniela Zini	(Liechtenstein) Hanni Wenzel	(Switzerland) Erika Hess
325	27	11 March 1980	(Austria) Saalbach	SL _{115}	(Italy) Claudia Giordani	(West Germany) Christa Kinshofer	(Liechtenstein) Hanni Wenzel
326	28	12 March 1980	(Austria) Saalbach	GS _{104}	(West Germany) Irene Epple	(France) Perrine Pelen	(France) Fabienne Serrat
Nations Cup		16 March 1980	(Austria) Saalbach	PS _{ncp}	(Austria) Annemarie Moser-Pröll	(Italy) Claudia Giordani	(West Germany) Maria Epple

== Men ==
=== Overall ===
see complete table

In men's overall World Cup 1979/80 the best four downhills, best four giant slaloms, best four slaloms and best three combined count. 27 racers had a point deduction. Ingemar Stenmark had 128 points deduction and won 11 races. Andreas Wenzel was able to collect points in all disciplines by winning three events and had only 8 points deduction.

Place	Name	Country	Total	DH	GS	SL	KB
1	Andreas Wenzel	Liechtenstein	204	23	65	51	65
2	Ingemar Stenmark	Sweden	200	0	100	100	0
3	Phil Mahre	United States	132	0	41	36	55
4	Bojan Križaj	Yugoslavia	131	0	54	77	0
5	Anton Steiner	Austria	130	14	15	41	60
6	Jacques Lüthy	Switzerland	116	0	71	45	0
7	Hans Enn	Austria	100	0	75	25	0
8	Herbert Plank	Italy	91	80	0	0	11
9	Peter Müller	Switzerland	87	87	0	0	0
	Peter Lüscher	Switzerland	87	0	39	11	37
11	Ken Read	Canada	79	79	0	0	0
12	Steve Mahre	United States	72	0	8	44	20
13	Petar Popangelov	Bulgaria	70	0	6	64	0
14	Aleksandr Zhirov	Soviet Union	68	0	14	54	0
15	Harti Weirather	Austria	64	64	0	0	0

=== Downhill ===
see complete table

In men's downhill World Cup 1979/80 the best 5 results count. Seven racers had a point deduction, which are given in brackets.

Place	Name	Country	Total	1 (France)	6 (Italy)	8 (France)	10 (Austria)	13 (Switzerland)	14 (Switzerland)	21 (Canada)
1	Peter Müller	Switzerland	96	-	25	25	9	12	25	(2)
2	Ken Read	Canada	87	-	9	(2)	25	25	20	8
3	Herbert Plank	Italy	81	20	-	20	15	1	-	25
4	Harti Weirather	Austria	75	11	(1)	12	20	(9)	12	20
5	Erik Håker	Norway	64	15	20	15	7	7	(4)	-
6	Peter Wirnsberger	Austria	63	25	-	5	(3)	15	9	9
7	Josef Walcher	Austria	60	10	10	9	-	20	11	(5)
	Werner Grissmann	Austria	60	12	15	11	-	(5)	7	15
9	Steve Podborski	Canada	35	-	-	-	-	8	15	12
10	Michael Veith	West Germany	28	4	-	6	-	6	5	7

=== Giant slalom ===
see complete table

In men's giant slalom World Cup 1979/80 the best 5 results count. Eight racers had a point deduction, which are given in brackets. Ingemar Stenmark won the cup with maximum points. He won his fifth Giant slalom World Cup (third in a row).

Place	Name	Country	Total	2 (France)	5 (Italy)	16 (Switzerland)	18 (United States)	20 (Canada)	23 (Germany)	25 (Italy)	26 (Austria)
1	Ingemar Stenmark	Sweden	125	25	25	25	-	25	(15)	25	(25)
2	Hans Enn	Austria	87	15	12	-	25	-	(9)	20	15
3	Jacques Lüthy	Switzerland	82	11	20	20	(8)	11	20	(9)	(11)
4	Andreas Wenzel	Liechtenstein	71	8	-	6	20	-	25	12	(2)
5	Joël Gaspoz	Switzerland	68	(3)	-	15	(2)	8	10	15	20
6	Bojan Križaj	Yugoslavia	56	20	15	-	-	-	2	10	9
7	Jarle Halsnes	Norway	51	9	7	(1)	15	9	11	-	-
8	Boris Strel	Yugoslavia	50	12	9	7	12	(5)	-	-	10
9	Phil Mahre	United States	43	2	-	-	7	20	6	8	-
10	Bohumír Zeman	Czechoslovakia	42	-	-	9	-	15	8	2	8

=== Slalom ===
see complete table

In men's slalom World Cup 1979/80 the best 5 results count. Six racers had a point deduction, which are given in brackets. Ingemar Stenmark won the cup with maximum points. He won his sixth Slalom World Cup in a row!

Place	Name	Country	Total	4 (Italy)	9 (Germany)	12 (Austria)	15 (Switzerland)	17 (France)	19 (United States)	24 (Italy)	27 (Austria)
1	Ingemar Stenmark	Sweden	125	25	(15)	(3)	(20)	25	25	25	25
2	Bojan Križaj	Yugoslavia	88	20	(8)	12	25	20	11	-	(11)
3	Christian Neureuther	West Germany	69	(6)	(1)	20	7	-	20	10	12
4	Petar Popangelov	Bulgaria	64	-	25	-	-	12	12	-	15
5	Aleksandr Zhirov	Soviet Union	57	-	20	-	5	3	9	20	-
6	Christian Orlainsky	Austria	55	-	7	-	9	15	-	15	9
7	Jacques Lüthy	Switzerland	53	10	-	15	10	8	-	(2)	10
8	Andreas Wenzel	Liechtenstein	51	11	9	25	-	6	-	-	-
9	Anton Steiner	Austria	49	8	(3)	-	12	11	10	-	8
10	Paul Frommelt	Liechtenstein	45	15	4	-	15	-	-	9	2

=== Combined ===
see complete table

After the season 1975/76 this was the second time, that a Combined World Cup was awarded. All four results count.

Place	Name	Country	Total	3 (France)	7 (Italy)	11 (Germany) (Austria)	22 (France) (Canada)
1	Phil Mahre	United States	67	25	12	15	15
2	Andreas Wenzel	Liechtenstein	65	-	20	25	20
3	Anton Steiner	Austria	60	-	15	20	25
4	Peter Lüscher	Switzerland	37	-	25	12	-
5	Francisco Fernández Ochoa	Spain	27	9	10	8	-
6	Michel Vion	France	24	15	9	-	-
7	Valeri Tsyganov	Soviet Union	22	11	11	-	-
8	Steve Mahre	United States	20	20	-	-	-
9	Andy Mill	United States	19	6	6	7	-
10	Bill Taylor	United States	17	7	-	-	10

== Women ==
=== Overall ===
see complete table

In women's overall World Cup 1979/80 the best four downhills, best four giant slaloms, best four slaloms and best three combined count. 23 racers had a point deduction. Hanni Wenzel had a total deduction of 158 points. She won nine competitions and was unable to score points only in one event! (The first slalom at Vysoké Tatry.)

Place	Name	Country	Total	DH	GS	SL	KB
1	Hanni Wenzel	Liechtenstein	311	56	100	85	70
2	Annemarie Moser-Pröll	Austria	259	85	37	72	65
3	Marie-Theres Nadig	Switzerland	221	100	85	11	25
4	Perrine Pelen	France	192	0	80	100	12
5	Irene Epple	West Germany	141	43	72	5	21
6	Fabienne Serrat	France	122	0	49	48	25
7	Erika Hess	Switzerland	111	0	59	52	0
8	Claudia Giordani	Italy	107	0	39	68	0
9	Daniela Zini	Italy	99	0	32	67	0
10	Cindy Nelson	United States	94	53	3	1	37
11	Christa Kinshofer	West Germany	79	0	42	37	0
12	Heidi Preuss	United States	78	42	3	4	29
13	Jana Šoltýsová	Czechoslovakia	72	51	0	0	21
14	Tamara McKinney	United States	65	0	24	41	0
15	Regine Mösenlechner	West Germany	60	0	22	38	0

=== Downhill ===
see complete table

In women's downhill World Cup 1979/80 the best 5 results count. Seven racers had a point deduction, which are given in brackets. Marie-Theres Nadig won 6 races out of 7 and won the World Cup with maximum points.

Place	Name	Country	Total	1 (France)	5 (Italy)	8 (Austria)	9 (Germany)	10 (Germany)	13 (Switzerland)	16 (Austria)
1	Marie-Theres Nadig	Switzerland	125	25	25	25	(20)	25	25	(25)
2	Annemarie Moser-Pröll	Austria	100	(11)	20	15	25	(12)	20	20
3	Hanni Wenzel	Liechtenstein	66	10	11	(9)	15	(10)	15	15
4	Cindy Nelson	United States	59	20	(4)	12	10	-	6	11
5	Jana Šoltýsová	Czechoslovakia	58	9	15	20	(5)	7	(5)	7
6	Irene Epple	West Germany	51	(2)	10	11	12	8	(7)	10
7	Heidi Preuss	United States	48	12	-	8	-	6	10	12
8	Doris de Agostini	Switzerland	47	-	-	5	7	15	12	8
9	Evi Mittermaier	West Germany	42	6	8	10	9	9	-	-
10	Laurie Graham	Canada	38	15	9	6	-	-	3	5

=== Giant slalom ===
see complete table

In women's giant slalom World Cup 1978/79 the best 5 results count. Six racers had a point deduction, which are given in brackets. Hanni Wenzel won five races in a row. She won the World Cup with maximum points.

Place	Name	Country	Total	2 (France)	4 (Italy)	12 (Germany)	14 (Switzerland)	21 (France)	22 (United States)	24 (Canada)	28 (Austria)
1	Hanni Wenzel	Liechtenstein	125	(11)	25	25	25	25	25	(15)	(11)
2	Marie-Theres Nadig	Switzerland	95	25	-	-	20	15	10	25	-
	Perrine Pelen	France	95	20	(11)	20	15	20	(8)	(11)	20
4	Irene Epple	West Germany	83	(2)	-	(9)	11	12	15	20	25
5	Erika Hess	Switzerland	71	15	20	12	12	(11)	12	(12)	(2)
6	Fabienne Serrat	France	55	9	15	-	6	-	(6)	10	15
7	Annemarie Moser-Pröll	Austria	44	10	8	-	9	7	-	-	10
	Claudia Giordani	Italy	44	5	10	15	-	6	-	-	8
9	Christa Kinshofer	West Germany	42	12	-	-	10	-	-	8	12
10	Daniela Zini	Italy	37	8	5	-	7	8	-	-	9

=== Slalom ===
see complete table

In women's slalom World Cup 1979/80 the best 5 results count. 8 racers had a point deduction, which are given in brackets.

Place	Name	Country	Total	7 (Italy)	11 (Germany)	17 (Austria)	19 (Socialist Federal Republic of Yugoslavia)	20 (France)	23 (United States)	25 (Czechoslovakia)	26 (Czechoslovakia)	27 (Austria)
1	Perrine Pelen	France	120	20	25	(20)	(20)	25	25	25	(11)	-
2	Hanni Wenzel	Liechtenstein	100	(12)	(8)	25	25	(12)	15	-	20	15
3	Annemarie Moser-Pröll	Austria	83	25	11	12	15	20	-	(7)	-	(4)
4	Daniela Zini	Italy	78	(5)	15	11	(8)	15	-	(9)	25	12
5	Claudia Giordani	Italy	75	15	20	7	-	8	-	-	(7)	25
6	Erika Hess	Switzerland	62	-	12	15	10	-	-	-	15	10
7	Fabienne Serrat	France	56	(6)	10	-	9	9	8	20	-	(6)
8	Regine Mösenlechner	West Germany	44	8	-	10	-	10	6	10	-	-
9	Nadezhda Patrikeyeva	Soviet Union	43	-	-	-	11	-	20	-	12	-
10	Tamara McKinney	United States	41	-	-	9	7	-	-	15	10	-
	Lea Sölkner	Austria	41	9	-	8	-	6	(1)	11	-	7

=== Combined ===
see complete table

After the season 1975/76 this was the second time, that a Combined World Cup was awarded. All four results count.

Place	Name	Country	Total	3 (France)	6 (Italy)	15 (Switzerland)	18 (Austria)
1	Hanni Wenzel	Liechtenstein	90	20	25	20	25
2	Annemarie Moser-Pröll	Austria	80	15	20	25	20
3	Cindy Nelson	United States	37	11	-	11	15
4	Heidi Preuss	United States	29	6	-	12	11
5	Torill Fjeldstad	Norway	26	7	12	-	7
6	Marie-Theres Nadig	Switzerland	25	25	-	-	-
	Fabienne Serrat	France	25	10	15	-	-
8	Heidi Wiesler	West Germany	22	4	8	-	10
9	Ingrid Eberle	Austria	21	-	6	15	-
	Irene Epple	West Germany	21	9	-	-	12
	Jana Šoltýsová	Czechoslovakia	21	5	11	-	5

== Nations Cup ==
=== Overall ===
Place	Country	Total	Men	Women
1	Austria	1417	820	597
2	Switzerland	1102	505	597
3	Liechtenstein	781	257	524
4	United States	715	304	411
5	Italy	671	268	403
6	West Germany	643	167	476
7	France	553	42	511
8	Sweden	398	383	15
9	Canada	274	194	80
10	Yugoslavia	257	252	5
11	Norway	209	173	36
12	Czechoslovakia	186	53	133
13	Soviet Union	173	130	43
14	Bulgaria	70	70	0
15	Spain	27	27	0
16	Japan	13	13	0
17	Belgium	10	6	4
18	Australia	8	8	0
19	Luxembourg	7	3	4
20	New Zealand	1	0	1
	Poland	1	0	1

=== Men ===
Place	Country	Total	DH	GS	SL	KB	Racers	Wins
1	Austria	820	380	204	176	60	16	3
2	Switzerland	505	162	224	74	45	11	4
3	Sweden	383	6	184	185	8	5	11
4	United States	304	17	54	86	147	9	1
5	Italy	268	85	51	109	23	11	1
6	Liechtenstein	257	23	73	96	65	2	3
7	Yugoslavia	252	0	138	114	0	4	1
8	Canada	194	162	0	0	32	8	2
9	Norway	173	71	75	15	12	7	0
10	West Germany	167	42	23	92	10	7	0
11	Soviet Union	130	19	14	75	22	3	0
12	Bulgaria	70	0	6	64	0	1	1
13	Czechoslovakia	53	0	42	11	0	1	0
14	France	42	1	17	0	24	3	0
15	Spain	27	0	0	0	27	1	0
16	Japan	13	3	0	10	0	2	0
17	Australia	8	0	0	0	8	1	0
18	Belgium	6	0	0	0	6	2	0
19	Luxembourg	3	0	3	0	0	1	0

=== Women ===
Place	Country	Total	DH	GS	SL	KB	Racers	Wins
1	Austria	597	172	97	200	128	16	3
	Switzerland	597	280	200	89	28	11	9
3	Liechtenstein	524	85	192	157	90	3	9
4	France	511	26	188	245	52	9	4
5	West Germany	476	130	190	105	51	10	1
6	United States	411	146	75	100	90	11	0
7	Italy	403	5	122	276	0	8	2
8	Czechoslovakia	133	68	10	21	34	4	0
9	Canada	80	45	11	0	24	3	0
10	Soviet Union	43	0	0	43	0	1	0
11	Norway	36	2	8	0	2	1	0
12	Sweden	15	0	13	2	0	1	0
13	Yugoslavia	5	0	0	5	0	1	0
14	Luxembourg	4	4	0	0	0	1	0
	Belgium	4	4	0	0	0	1	0
16	New Zealand	1	0	0	0	1	1	0
	Poland	1	0	0	1	0	1	0
