= Aleksandr Zhirov =

Aleksandr Zhirov may refer to:

- Aleksandr Zhirov (alpine skier) (1958–1983), Soviet alpine skier
- Aleksandr Zhirov (footballer) (born 1991), Russian footballer
