= Giuseppe Carletti =

Italian alpine skier (born 1959)

Personal information
- Born: 22 July 1959 (age 67) Foppolo, Italy

Skiing career
- Sport: Alpine skiing
- Disciplines: Technical events

World Championships
- Teams: 1
- Medals: 0

Giuseppe Carletti (born 22 July 1959) is a former Italian World Cup alpine ski racer.

== World Championships results ==
Year
| Year | Age | Slalom | Giant; Slalom | Downhill | Combined |
| 1982 | 20 | - | DNF2 | - | - |
