= Alain Navillod =

French alpine skier (born 1955)

Alain Navillod (born 16 August 1955) is a French former alpine skier who competed in the Innsbruck 1976 Winter Olympics, where he ranked 15th during the Giant Slalom.

His best result in an FIS World Cup was 9th in the Giant Slalom in Val d'Isere (France) on 10 December 1977. He also ranked 9th on the Slalom FIS World Cup stop in Zwiesel (Germany) on 9 January 1978.

After his sports career he opened a ski shop, Intersport, in Courchevel 1850, France.
