= Cornelia Pröll =

Austrian alpine skier (born 1961)

Cornelia Pröll (born 21 January 1961) is an Austrian former alpine skier who competed in the 1980 Winter Olympics.

She was born in Kleinarl, the younger sister of Annemarie Moser-Pröll.

Cornelia, named "Conny", finished 22nd in the Olympic Downhill Race on 7 February 1980, which was won by her sister Annemarie. She became Austrian downhill champion (18 March 1979, Bad Gastein). She was faster than Annemarie in the World Cup Downhill Race in Pfronten on 7 January 1980 (finishing 2nd, Annemarie finished 4th with 0.36 seconds behind of her), and also in Pfronten she could win the downhill race on 8 January 1981. She finished 3rd in the downhill race of Haus in Ennstal (the place of female races of the FIS Alpine Skiing World Championships 1982) on 8 February 1981.
