= Nadezhda Andreyeva =

Russian alpine skier (1959–2014)

Personal information
- Full name: Nadezhda Patrikeyeva Andreyeva
- Born: 3 January 1959 Kirovsk, Murmansk Oblast, Russian SFSR, Soviet Union
- Died: 11 August 2014 (aged 55)
- Height: 1.69 m (5 ft 7 in)
- Weight: 65 kg (143 lb)

Sport
- Sport: Alpine skiing
- Club: Trud Moscow

Nadezhda Patrikeyeva Andreyeva (Russian: Надежда Андреева née Патрикеева; 3 January 1959 – 11 August 2014) was a Russian alpine skier. She competed at the 1980 and 1984 Winter Olympics in the slalom and giant slalom with the best achievement of sixth place in the slalom in 1980. She missed the 1976 Olympics due to a serious injury in a slalom in late 1975, which resulted in a broken pelvis and concussion.

She was born in a family of clerks and has an elder brother Yuri (born 1957), also an alpine skier who competed internationally. After the 1984 Olympics she won the national titles in slalom and giant slalom and retired from competitions. From 2001 until her death she worked as a director of sports school in a village of Shukolovo, Moscow Oblast. She was married to Vladimir Andreyev, a fellow Olympian and coach, and they had a son, Vladimir (born 1983), and a daughter, Maria (born 1993). Andreyeva died on 11 August 2014 in Moscow.
