= Osamu Kodama =

Japanese alpine skier (born 1956)

Osamu Kodama (児玉修, Kodama Osamu; born 21 September 1956 in Nagano) is a Japanese former alpine skier who competed in the 1980 Winter Olympics and 1984 Winter Olympics.
