= Michel Canac =

French alpine skier (1956–2019)

Michel Canac (2 August 1956 – 30 May 2019) was a French alpine skier who competed in the 1984 Winter Olympics.
