= Albert Burger (alpine skier) =

German alpine skier (1955–2023)

Albert Burger (8 May 1955 – 16 November 2023) was a German alpine skier who competed in the 1976 Winter Olympics and 1980 Winter Olympics. Burger died on 16 November 2023, at the age of 68.
