= Toshihiro Kaiwa =

Japanese alpine skier (born 1955)

Toshihiro Kaiwa (海和俊宏, Kaiwa Toshihiro; born 24 April 1955) is a Japanese former alpine skier who competed in the 1980 Winter Olympics and 1984 Winter Olympics.
