= Lars-Göran Halvarsson =

Swedish alpine skier (born 1961)

Personal information
- Born: 23 April 1961; Älvdalen, Sweden

Sport
- Sport: alpine skiing
- Club: Groko Alpina SK

Rolf Lars-Göran Halvarsson (born 23 April 1961, in Älvdalen) is a Swedish former alpine skier who competed in the 1984 and 1988 Winter Olympics.
