= Bengt Fjällberg =

Swedish alpine skier (born 1961)

Medal record

Men's alpine skiing

Representing Sweden

World Championships
Bronze medal – third place	1982 Schladming	Slalom

Bengt Henrik Fjällberg (born 15 September 1961) is a Swedish former alpine skier. His greatest achievement is the slalom bronze in the 1982 World Championships in Schladming. He was trained by Hermann Nogler. Fjällberg and Ingemar Stenmark are second cousins.
