= Boris Strel =

Slovenian alpine skier (1959–2013)

- Strel in 1981

Medal record

Men's alpine skiing

Representing Yugoslavia

World Championships
Bronze medal – third place	1982 Schladming	Giant slalom

Boris Strel (20 October 1959 – 28 March 2013) was a Slovenian alpine skier. He was born in Žiri, Slovenia (then part of Yugoslavia). In December 1981, Strel took the only Slovenian top-level win in men's giant slalom in the 1982 Alpine Skiing World Cup competition in Cortina d'Ampezzo. He ended his career after the 1984/85 season due to problems with his spine and was later active as a ski school and a ski repair shop owner. Strel committed suicide on 28 March 2013.

== World Cup results ==
=== Season standings ===
Season	Age	Overall	Slalom	Giant slalom	Super-G	Downhill	Combined
1979	19	25	33	11	—	—	—
1980	20	25	—	8	—	—	—
1981	21	21	—	12	—	—	12
1982	22	42	—	14	—	—	—
1983	23	36	—	11	—	—	—
1984	24	38	—	14	—	—	44
1985	25	77	—	36	—	—	—

=== Race podiums ===
Season	Date	Location	Discipline	Position
1981	26 January 1981	Adelboden, Switzerland	Giant slalom	2nd
1982	15 December 1981	Cortina d'Ampezzo, Italy	Giant slalom	1st

== Olympic Games results ==
Season	Age	Slalom	Giant slalom	Super-G	Downhill	Combined
1980	20	DNF2	8	not run	—	not run
1984	24	—	5	not run	—	not run

== World Championships results ==
Season	Age	Slalom	Giant slalom	Super-G	Downhill	Combined
1980	20	DNF2	8	not run	—	—
1982	22	—	3	not run	—	—

From 1948 through 1980, the Winter Olympics were also the World Championships for alpine skiing.
