= Gerhard Jäger =

Austrian alpine skier

Personal information
- Born: 8 February 1958 (age 68) Filzmoos, Austria

Skiing career
- Sport: Alpine skiing
- Retired: 1982
- Disciplines: Technical events
- World Cup debut: 1978

World Cup
- Seasons: 5
- Podiums: 2
Medal record
Men's alpine skiing
Representing Austria
World Cup race podiums
Event	1st	2nd	3rd
Giant slalom	0	1	1

Gerhard Jäger (born 8 February 1958) is a former Austrian alpine skier.

== Career ==
During his career he has achieved 9 results among the top 10 (2 podiums) in the World Cup.

== World Cup results ==
Top 10

Date	Place	Discipline	Rank
17-03-1982	(Austria) Bad Kleinkirchheim	Giant slalom	10
09-01-1982	(France) Morzine	Giant slalom	9
14-03-1981	(Japan) Furano	Giant slalom	2
10-12-1980	(Italy) Madonna di Campiglio	Giant slalom	3
13-03-1980	(Austria) Saalbach-Hinterglemm	Giant slalom	9
26-02-1980	(United States) Waterville Valley	Giant slalom	5
12-12-1979	(Italy) Madonna di Campiglio	Giant slalom	8
06-03-1978	(United States) Waterville Valley	Giant slalom	8
03-03-1978	(United States) Stratton Mountain	Giant slalom	8
