= Wolfram Ortner =

Austrian alpine skier (born 1960)

Personal information
- Born: 10 March 1960 (age 66) Bad Kleinkirchheim, Austria

Skiing career
- Sport: Alpine skiing
- Retired: 1982
- Disciplines: Technical events
- World Cup debut: 1978

World Championships
- Teams: 1 (1982)

World Cup
- Seasons: 4

Wolfram Ortner (born 10 March 1960) is an Austrian former alpine skier who was 4th at the 1982 World Championships in combined.

== World Cup results ==
Top 5

Date	Place	Discipline	Position
09-02-1982	(Austria) Kirchberg	Giant Slalom	5
01-02-1981	(Austria) St. Anton	Slalom	5
04-02-1979	(Czechoslovakia) Jasna	Giant Slalom	4
22-01-1978	(Austria) Kitzbühel	Slalom	5
