= Jean-Luc Fournier =

Swiss alpine skier (born 1956)

Jean-Luc Fournier (born 23 September 1956) is a retired Swiss alpine skier who competed in the 1980 Winter Olympics. Although Fournier was unable to achieve another podium finish in the 1980/81 season, he remained in the top ten five times. He finished eighth in the giant slalom at the 1982 World Championships. Fournier ended his career in March 1982 after finishing 11th in Kranjska Gora.
