= Valeri Tsyganov =

Soviet alpine skier (born 1956)

Valeri Tsyganov (born 14 October 1956) is a Soviet former alpine skier who competed in the 1980 Winter Olympics and 1984 Winter Olympics. He won one race on the FIS World Cup, a downhill at Aspen, Colorado on March 5, 1981.
