= Alex Giorgi =

Italian alpine skier (born 1957)

Alex Giorgi (born 9 December 1957) is an Italian former alpine skier who competed in the 1980 Winter Olympics and 1984 Winter Olympics.
