= Steve Mahre =

American alpine skier

Personal information
- Born: May 10, 1957 (age 69) Yakima, Washington, U.S.
- Height: 1.76 m (5 ft 9 in)
- Website: mahretrainingcenter.com

Skiing career
- Sport: Alpine skiing
- Club: White Pass
- Retired: March 1984 (age 26)
- Disciplines: Downhill, Super G, giant slalom, slalom, combined
- World Cup debut: January 27, 1976 (age 18)

Olympics
- Teams: 3 – (1976, 1980, 1984)
- Medals: 1 (0 gold)

World Championships
- Teams: 4 – (1976–82) includes two Olympics
- Medals: 1 (1 gold)

World Cup
- Seasons: 9 – (1976–84)
- Wins: 9 – (2 GS, 6 SL, 1 K)
- Podiums: 21 – (3 GS, 14 SL, 4 K)
- Overall titles: 0 – (3rd in 1982)
- Discipline titles: 0 – (3rd in SL, 1981, 1982)
Medal record
Representing the United States
World Cup race podiums
Event	1st	2nd	3rd
Slalom	6	3	5
Giant slalom	2	0	1
Combined	1	2	1
Total	9	5	7
Olympic Games
Silver medal – second place	1984 Sarajevo	Slalom
World Championships
Gold medal – first place	1982 Schladming	Giant slalom

Steven Irving Mahre (born May 10, 1957 in Yakima, Washington) is a former World Cup alpine ski racer and younger twin brother (by four minutes) of ski racer Phil Mahre.

== Career ==
Mahre won the silver medal in slalom at the 1984 Winter Olympics in Sarajevo, 0.21 seconds behind his brother. He won the gold medal in giant slalom at the 1982 World Championships in Schladming, Austria. His best finish in the overall standings was third in 1982 and fourth in 1981 (brother Phil was the overall World Cup champion in 1981, 1982, and 1983).

After nine seasons, the Mahre twins retired from the World Cup circuit following the 1984 season. Steve finished his career with 9 World Cup victories and 21 podiums. They would be honored with the ceremonial first pitch at the 1984 Seattle Mariners season home opener.

The book No Hill Too Fast, written by the Mahre brothers, was published in 1985.

== World Cup results ==
=== Season standings ===
Season	Age	Overall	Slalom	Giant Slalom	Super-G	Downhill	Combined
1976	18	27	8	13	—N/a	—	—
1977	19	43	14	—	—N/a	—	not awarded
1978	20	23	9	—	—N/a	—	not awarded
1979	21	10	13	22	—N/a	—	not awarded
1980	22	12	11	14	—N/a	—	8
1981	23	4	3	11	—N/a	—	5
1982	24	3	3	7	—N/a	—	7
1983	25	12	4	27	not awarded	—	13
1984	26	47	22	30	not awarded	—	—

=== Race victories ===
- 9 wins (2 GS, 6 SL, 1 K)
- 21 podiums (3 GS, 14 SL, 4 K)

Season	Date	Location	Race
1978	4 Mar 1978	(United States) Stratton Mountain, Vermont, USA	Slalom
1981	11 Jan 1981	Garmisch, West Germany	Slalom
1982	14 Dec 1981	Cortina d'Ampezzo, Italy	Slalom
1982	14 Feb 1982	Garmisch, West Germany	Slalom
1982	14 Feb 1982	Garmisch, West Germany	Combined
1982	(Austria) 1982 World Championships		
1982	13 Mar 1982	Jasná, Czechoslovakia	Giant slalom
1982	17 Mar 1982	Bad Kleinkirchheim, Austria	Giant slalom
1983	4 Jan 1983	Parpan, Switzerland	Slalom
1983	6 Feb 1983	St. Anton, Austria	Slalom

== World championship results ==
Year	Age	Slalom	Giant Slalom	Super-G	Downhill	Combined
1976	18	—	13	—N/a	—	—
1978	20	8	16	—N/a	—	—
1980	22	DNF1	15	—N/a	—	—
1982	24	DNF1	1	—N/a	—	—

From 1948 through 1980, the Winter Olympics were also the World Championships for alpine skiing.

== Olympic results ==
Year	Age	Slalom	Giant Slalom	Super-G	Downhill	Combined
1976	18	—	13	—N/a	—	—N/a
1980	22	DNF1	15	—N/a	—	—N/a
1984	26	2	17	—N/a	—	—N/a

== See also ==
- List of Olympic medalist families
