= Paul Arne Skajem =

Norwegian alpine skier (born 1958)

Paul Arne Skajem (born 1 December 1958) is a Norwegian alpine skier.

He was born in Oslo, and represented the club IL Heming. He represented Norway at the 1980 Winter Olympics in Lake Placid, competing in Alpine Skiing with the best result of 11th place in slalom.

He later became known as an alpine skiing commentator for the Norwegian Broadcasting Corporation.
