= Bojan Križaj =

Slovenian alpine skier

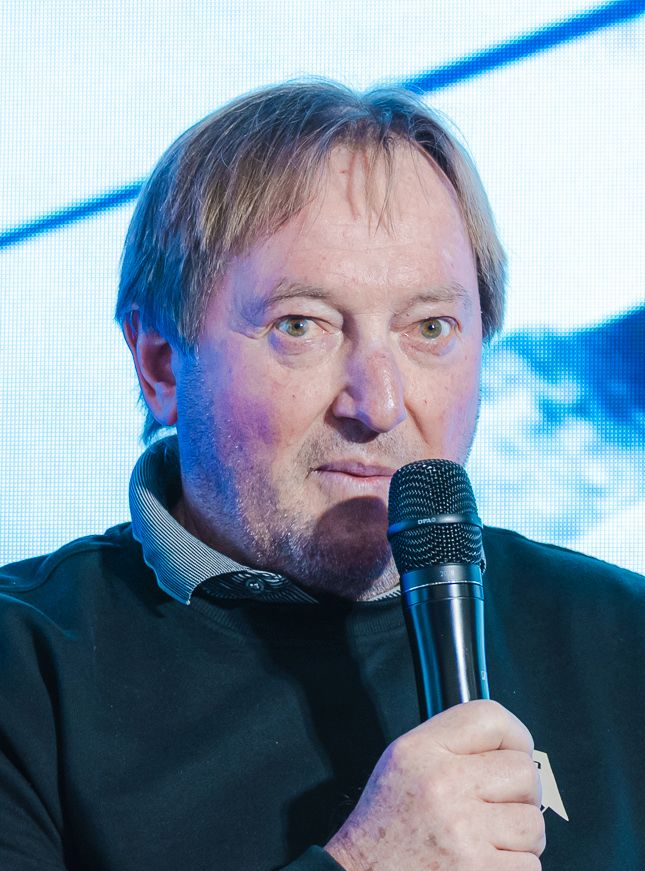
- Bojan Križaj in 2026

Personal information
- Born: 3 January 1957 (age 69) Kranj, SFR Yugoslavia

Skiing career
- Sport: Alpine skiing
- Retired: 26 March 1988
- Disciplines: Giant slalom, slalom, combined
- World Cup debut: 10 December 1976

Olympics
- Medals: 0 (0 gold)

World Championships
- Medals: 1 (0 gold)

World Cup
- Seasons: 12
- Wins: 8
- Podiums: 33
- Overall titles: 0
- Discipline titles: 1
Medal record
Men's alpine skiing
Representing Yugoslavia
World Cup race podiums
Event	1st	2nd	3rd
Slalom	8	9	9
Giant slalom	0	3	4
Total	8	12	13
World Championships
Silver medal – second place	1982 Schladming	Slalom

Bojan Križaj (born 3 January 1957) is a Slovenian former alpine skier. During his international career he competed for the then-existing Yugoslavia. He competed at three Winter Olympics.

== Career ==
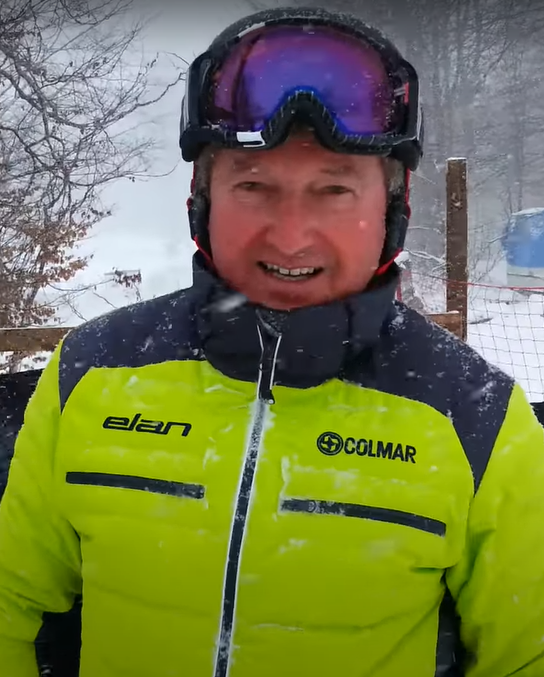
Križaj in 2015 at 58.

Križaj, born in Kranj, was a member of a well known Tržič ski family so he started skiing at the age of 3. In the season 1976/77 he received the first World Cup point, qualified among the 15 best slalom runners and later during that season in Madonna di Campiglio he hit his first top 3 podium. On 20 January 1980 he achieved the first Yugoslav World Cup victory in Wengen, Switzerland and later he won seven more times, thus still being Yugoslavia's and Slovenia's most successful male alpine skier to date.

At 1980 Winter Olympics in Lake Placid, New York, U.S., he reached the fourth place in giant slalom, missing the bronze medal by only two hundredths of a second. Four years later he took the athlete's oath at the opening ceremony for Sarajevo's 1984 Winter Olympics. He caused a stir when he spoke the oath not in Croatian or Serbian but in Slovene. Despite great expectations of the Yugoslav audience he finished ninth in giant slalom, much less than expected. Križaj should also have competed at 1988 Winter Olympics in Calgary, Alberta, Canada, but he got injured a few days before the event.

His most successful World Championship was in 1982 in Schladming, Austria where he received the silver medal in slalom.

His most successful World Cup season was 1986/87 when he received the small crystal globe for the season's best slalom runner (that was the only men's crystal globe of that season not won by Pirmin Zurbriggen). Beside that he was the second in World Cup slalom standings in the 1979/80 and 1985/86 seasons and third in the 1980/81 season. His best position in overall World Cup standings was the 4th place in 1979/80.

He concluded his career in 1988 at the race in Saalbach, Austria where he stepped off the skis right at the end of the track and walked into the finish area. Since his skiing retirement he worked in many fields, including as importer of Austrian brand beer and adviser for ski products in Elan company. In March 2006 he became Head of Slovenian Ski Pool.

== World Cup results ==
=== Season titles ===
Season	Discipline
1987	Slalom

=== Season standings ===
Season	Age	Overall	Slalom	Giant slalom	Super-G	Downhill	Combined
1977	19	43	15	22	—	—	—
1978	20	20	11	12	—	—	—
1979	21	8	12	3	—	—	—
1980	22	4	2	6	—	—	—
1981	23	6	3	15	—	—	12
1982	24	9	6	8	—	—	—
1983	25	9	5	20	—	—	15
1984	26	10	5	17	—	—	31
1985	27	10	6	22	—	—	20
1986	28	15	2	19	—	—	—
1987	29	9	1	—	—	—	—
1988	30	51	16	—	—	—	—

=== Race podiums ===
- 8 wins (8 SL)
- 33 podiums (26 SL, 7 GS)

Season	Date	Location	Discipline	Position
1978	13 December 1977	Madonna di Campiglio, Italy	Slalom	3rd
1979	22 December 1978	(Socialist Federal Republic of Yugoslavia) Kranjska Gora, Slovenia	Giant slalom	3rd
1979	7 January 1979	Courchevel, France	Giant slalom	3rd
1979	4 February 1979	Jasna, Czechoslovakia	Giant slalom	2nd
1979	13 March 1979	Heavenly Valley, United States	Giant slalom	2nd
1980	8 December 1979	Val d'Isere, France	Giant slalom	2nd
1980	11 December 1979	Madonna di Campiglio, Italy	Slalom	2nd
1980	12 December 1979	Madonna di Campiglio, Italy	Giant slalom	3rd
1980	20 January 1980	Wengen, Switzerland	Slalom	1st
1980	27 January 1980	Chamonix, France	Slalom	2nd
1981	9 December 1980	Madonna di Campiglio, Italy	Slalom	3rd
1981	6 January 1981	Morzine, France	Giant slalom	3rd
1981	25 January 1981	Wengen, Switzerland	Slalom	1st
1981	15 March 1981	Furano, Japan	Slalom	2nd
1982	20 March 1982	(Socialist Federal Republic of Yugoslavia) Kranjska Gora, Yugoslavia	Slalom	1st
1983	12 February 1983	Markstein, France	Slalom	1st
1983	23 February 1983	Tärnaby, Sweden	Slalom	3rd
1983	20 March 1983	Furano, Japan	Slalom	3rd
1984	13 December 1983	Courmayeur, Italy	Slalom	2nd
1984	22 January 1984	Kitzbühel, Austria	Slalom	3rd
1985	16 December 1984	Madonna di Campiglio, Italy	Slalom	1st
1985	13 January 1985	Kitzbühel, Austria	Slalom	3rd
1986	1 December 1985	Sestriere, Italy	Slalom	2nd
1986	16 December 1985	Madonna di Campiglio, Italy	Slalom	2nd
1986	14 January 1986	Berchtesgaden, Germany	Slalom	2nd
1986	2 February 1986	Wengen, Switzerland	Slalom	3rd
1986	21 March 1986	Bromont, Canada	Slalom	1st
1987	20 December 1986	(Socialist Federal Republic of Yugoslavia) Kranjska Gora, Yugoslavia	Slalom	1st
1987	21 December 1986	Hinterstoder, Austria	Slalom	2nd
1987	18 January 1987	Wengen, Switzerland	Slalom	3rd
1987	25 January 1987	Kitzbühel, Austria	Slalom	1st
1987	21 March 1987	(Socialist Federal Republic of Yugoslavia) Sarajevo, Yugoslavia	Slalom	2nd
1988	16 December 1987	Madonna di Campiglio, Italy	Slalom	3rd

== Olympic Games results ==
Season	Age	Slalom	Giant slalom	Super-G	Downhill	Combined
1976	18	DNF1	18	not run	—	not run
1980	22	DNF1	4	not run	—	not run
1984	26	7	9	not run	—	not run
1988	30	injured, did not compete				

== World Championships results ==
Season	Age	Slalom	Giant slalom	Super-G	Downhill	Combined
1974	16	13	—	not run	—	—
1976	18	DNF1	18	not run	—	—
1978	20	DNF	DNF	not run	—	—
1980	22	DNF1	4	not run	—	—
1982	24	2	7	not run	—	DNF SL2
1985	27	5	8	not run	—	—
1987	29	6	—	—	—	—

From 1948 through 1980, the Winter Olympics were also the World Championships for alpine skiing.

Awards
Preceded by Dražen Dalipagić; Borut Petrič; Rok Petrovič	Yugoslav Sportsman of the Year; 1979; 1982; 1987	Succeeded by Slobodan Kačar; Dragutin Šurbek; Goran Maksimović
