= Christian Orlainsky =

Austrian alpine skier (born 1962)

Personal information
- Born: 27 February 1962 (age 64) Tschagguns, Austria

Skiing career
- Sport: Alpine skiing
- Disciplines: Technical events

Olympics
- Teams: 1

World Cup
- Wins: 1
- Podiums: 8
Medal record
Men's alpine skiing
Representing Austria
World Cup race podiums
| Event | 1st | 2nd | 3rd |
|---|---|---|---|
| Slalom | 0 | 1 | 4 |
| Giant slalom | 1 | 1 | 0 |
| Combined | 0 | 1 | 0 |
| Total | 1 | 3 | 4 |

Christian Orlainsky (born 27 February 1962) is an Austrian former alpine skier who competed in the 1980 Winter Olympics.

== Career ==
In 1980 he finished 13th in the Olympic giant slalom event. He also competed in the slalom competition but did not finish the race. In 1981 he won his only world cup giant slalom in Ebnat-Kappel and finished sixth in the giant slalom world cup.
