= Jarle Halsnes =

Norwegian alpine skier (born 1957)

Jarle Halsnes (born 4 May 1957) is a Norwegian alpine skier. He was born in Sauda, and represented the club Sauda IL. He competed at the 1980 Winter Olympics in Lake Placid.
