= Joël Gaspoz =

Swiss alpine skier

Personal information
- Born: 25 September 1962 (age 63) Morgins, Valais, Switzerland

Skiing career
- Sport: Alpine skiing
- Retired: 1989
- Disciplines: Technical events
- World Cup debut: 1982

Olympics
- Teams: 3

World Championships
- Teams: 3

World Cup
- Seasons: 8
- Wins: 6
- Podiums: 20
- Discipline titles: 1
Medal record
Men's alpine skiing
Representing Switzerland
World Cup race podiums
Event	1st	2nd	3rd
Slalom	0	1	2
Giant slalom	6	4	6
Parallel	0	1	0
Total	6	6	8

Joël Gaspoz (born 25 September 1962) is a Swiss former alpine skier.

== Career ==
He competed in the slalom and giant slalom at the 1980, 1984 and 1988 Olympics with the best result of seventh place in the giant slalom in 1980. He came close to winning the gold in the giant slalom at the 1987 Alpine Skiing World Championships on home snow at Crans Montana, holding a clear lead in the second run before crashing out with three gates to go.

From 1979 to 1989, Gaspoz won one slalom and six giant slalom World Cup races. In the 1987 Alpine Skiing World Cup, he finished first in the giant slalom standings, with his teammate Pirmin Zurbriggen.

== World Cup victories ==
Date	Location	Race
8 December 1981	(Italy) Aprica	Giant slalom
20 December 1985	(Slovenia) Kranjska Gora	Giant slalom
3 January 1986	(Slovenia) Kranjska Gora	Giant slalom
19 March 1986	(United States) Lake Placid	Giant slalom
15 December 1986	(Italy) Alta Badia	Giant slalom
20 December 1986	(Slovenia) Kranjska Gora	Giant slalom
18 January 1987	(Switzerland) Wengen	Slalom
