= Aleksandr Zhirov (alpine skier) =

Soviet alpine skier (1958–1983)

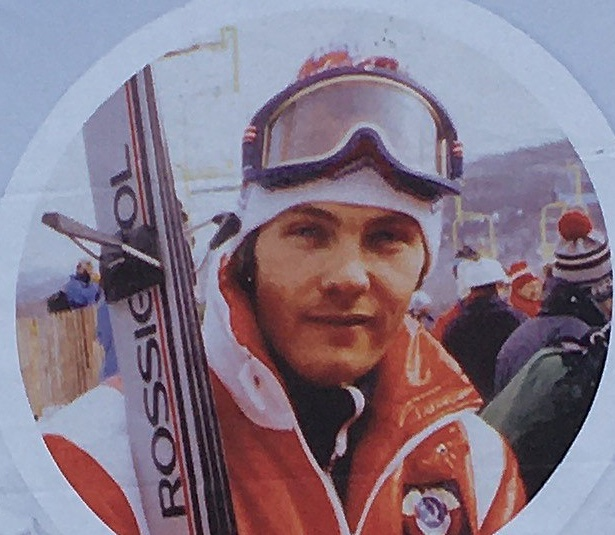

Personal information
- Born: 12 September 1958 Dedenevo, Moscow Oblast, Russian SFSR, Soviet Union
- Died: 18 May 1983 (aged 24) Shukolovo, Moscow Oblast, Russian SFSR, Soviet Union
- Height: 1.83 m (6 ft 0 in)
- Weight: 79 kg (174 lb)

Sport
- Sport: Alpine skiing

Aleksandr Vasilyevich Zhirov (Russian: Александр Васильевич Жиров; 12 September 1958 – 18 May 1983) was a Soviet alpine skier.

He competed at the 1980 Winter Olympics in the slalom and giant slalom and finished ninth in the latter event.

He won four Alpine Skiing World Cup races in March 1981 and finished second in the 1981 giant slalom world cup. Two years later he died in a car accident.

== World Cup victories ==
Date	Location	Race
14 March 1981	(Japan) Furano	Giant slalom
24 March 1981	(Bulgaria) Borovets	Giant slalom
25 March 1981	(Bulgaria) Borovets	Slalom
28 March 1981	(Switzerland) Laax	Giant slalom
