= 1980 Alpine Skiing World Cup – Men's downhill =

1980 Men's Downhill World Cup
Previous: 1979	Next: 1981

Men's downhill World Cup 1979/1980

== Final point standings ==
In men's downhill World Cup 1979/80 the best 5 results count. Seven racers had a point deduction, which are given in ().

Place	Name	Country	Total points	Deduction	1 (France)	6 (Italy)	8 (France)	10 (Austria)	13 (Switzerland)	14 (Switzerland)	21 (Canada)
1	Peter Müller	Switzerland	96	(2)	-	25	25	9	12	25	(2)
2	Ken Read	Canada	87	(2)	-	9	(2)	25	25	20	8
3	Herbert Plank	Italy	81		20	-	20	15	1	-	25
4	Harti Weirather	Austria	75	(10)	11	(1)	12	20	(9)	12	20
5	Erik Håker	Norway	64	(4)	15	20	15	7	7	(4)	-
6	Peter Wirnsberger	Austria	63	(3)	25	-	5	(3)	15	9	9
7	Josef Walcher	Austria	60	(5)	10	10	9	-	20	11	(5)
	Werner Grissmann	Austria	60	(5)	12	15	11	-	(5)	7	15
9	Steve Podborski	Canada	35		-	-	-	-	8	15	12
10	Michael Veith	West Germany	28		4	-	6	-	6	5	7
11	Ulrich Spieß	Austria	27		4	12	-	3	2	6	-
	Franz Klammer	Austria	27		-	11	4	10	-	2	-
13	Andreas Wenzel	Liechtenstein	23		-	-	-	12	-	-	11
14	Erwin Josi	Switzerland	21		-	-	-	-	10	10	1
15	Toni Bürgler	Switzerland	20		8	-	-	-	4	8	-
16	Valeri Tsyganov	Soviet Union	19		6	-	8	5	-	-	-
17	Walter Vesti	Switzerland	17		5	2	10	-	-	-	-
	Dave Irwin	Canada	17		2	-	-	11	-	-	4
19	Sepp Ferstl	West Germany	14		9	-	-	5	-	-	-
	Anton Steiner	Austria	14		-	-	-	8	-	-	6
21	Dave Murray	Canada	13		7	5	1	-	-	-	-
	Helmut Höflehner	Austria	13		-	-	3	-	-	-	10
23	Leonhard Stock	Austria	11		-	-	-	-	11	-	-
24	Tim Gilhooly	Canada	8		-	8	-	-	-	-	-
25	Karl Anderson	United States	7		-	7	-	-	-	-	-
	Ernst Winkler	Austria	7		-	-	7	-	-	-	-
	Pete Patterson	United States	7		-	-	-	6	-	1	-
28	Rune Safvenberg	Sweden	6		-	6	-	-	-	-	-
	Urs Räber	Switzerland	6		1	5	-	-	-	-	-
30	Danilo Sbardellotto	Italy	4		-	-	-	-	-	-	4
31	Arnt Erik Dale	Norway	3		-	3	-	-	-	-	-
	Mikio Katagiri	Japan	3		-	-	-	-	3	-	-
	Andy Mill	United States	3		-	-	-	-	-	-	3
34	Philippe Pugnat	France	1		-	-	-	1	-	-	-

Alpine skiing World Cup
Men

Overall | Downhill | Giant | Slalom | Combined

1980
