= 1981 Alpine Skiing World Cup – Men's downhill =

1981 Men's downhill World Cup
Previous: 1980	Next: 1982

Men's downhill World Cup 1980/1981

== Calendar ==
Round	Race No	Place	Country	Date	Winner	Second	Third
1	1	Val d'Isère	France	December 7, 1980	(Austria) Ulrich Spieß	(Canada) Ken Read	(Canada) Steve Podborski
2	4	Val Gardena	Italy	December 14, 1980	(Switzerland) Peter Müller	(Austria) Harti Weirather	(Canada) Steve Podborski
3	6	Val Gardena	Italy	December 15, 1980	(Austria) Harti Weirather	(Austria) Ulrich Spieß	(Switzerland) Peter Müller
4	7	St. Moritz	Switzerland	December 21, 1980	(Canada) Steve Podborski	(Austria) Peter Wirnsberger	(Switzerland) Peter Müller
5	11	Garmisch-Partenkirchen	West Germany	January 10, 1981	(Canada) Steve Podborski	(Switzerland) Peter Müller	(Austria) Harti Weirather
6	15	Kitzbühel	Austria	January 17, 1981	(Canada) Steve Podborski	(Switzerland) Peter Müller	(Austria) Peter Wirnsberger
7	18	Wengen	Switzerland	January 24, 1981	(Switzerland) Toni Bürgler	(Austria) Harti Weirather	(Canada) Steve Podborski
8	21	St. Anton	Austria	January 31, 1981	(Austria) Harti Weirather	(Austria) Peter Wirnsberger	(Canada) Steve Podborski
9	29	Aspen	United States	March 5, 1981	(Soviet Union) Valeri Tsyganov	(Austria) Harti Weirather	(Austria) Gerhard Pfaffenbichler
10	30	Aspen	United States	March 6, 1981	(Austria) Harti Weirather	(Canada) Steve Podborski	(Switzerland) Franz Heinzer

== Final point standings ==
In men's downhill World Cup 1980/81 the best 5 results count. Deductions are given in ().

Place	Name	Country	Total points	Deduction	1 (France)	4 (Italy)	6 (Italy)	7 (Switzerland)	11 (Germany)	15 (Austria)	18 (Switzerland)	21 (Austria)	29 (United States)	30 (United States)
1	Harti Weirather	Austria	115	(56)	-	20	25	(10)	(15)	(11)	20	25	(20)	25
2	Steve Podborski	Canada	110	(51)	15	(15)	(6)	25	25	25	(15)	(15)	(6)	20
3	Peter Müller	Switzerland	95	(23)	-	25	15	15	20	20	-	-	(12)	(11)
4	Peter Wirnsberger	Austria	73	(11)	-	-	-	20	9	15	(6)	20	9	(3)
5	Ulrich Spieß	Austria	56		25	11	20	-	-	-	-	-	-	-
6	Valeri Tsyganov	Soviet Union	55		3	-	-	12	-	4	11	-	25	-
	Toni Bürgler	Switzerland	55		-	-	7	-	11	-	25	-	-	12
8	Gerhard Pfaffenbichler	Austria	48		8	-	-	3	-	-	-	12	15	10
9	Helmut Höflehner	Austria	47	(10)	-	8	-	-	12	10	7	(5)	10	(5)
10	Franz Heinzer	Switzerland	43		-	-	-	-	-	8	4	9	7	15
	Leonhard Stock	Austria	43		-	10	11	11	-	-	-	-	5	6
12	Ken Read	Canada	42		20	5	10	7	-	-	-	-	-	-
13	Franz Klammer	Austria	37	(3)	-	6	10	8	(1)	-	9	(1)	(1)	4
14	Josef Walcher	Austria	33		-	-	-	9	-	5	8	11	-	-
15	Erwin Resch	Austria	32		-	12	4	-	7	-	-	-	-	9
16	Herbert Plank	Italy	29		-	-	3	-	10	12	-	4	-	-
17	Werner Grissmann	Austria	27		-	-	-	-	5	6	-	-	8	8
18	Vladimir Makeev	Soviet Union	26		7	-	-	-	-	-	12	7	-	-
19	Conradin Cathomen	Switzerland	24		-	-	1	-	-	-	10	10	2	1
20	Dave Irwin	Canada	23		11	-	-	5	4	-	-	-	3	-
21	Michael Veith	West Germany	21		-	5	8	-	8	-	-	-	-	-
22	Dave Murray	Canada	20		9	2	5	2	2	-	-	-	-	-
	Walter Vesti	Switzerland	20		6	3	2	6	-	-	3	-	-	-
	Pete Patterson	United States	20		10	-	-	-	-	-	5	-	5	-
25	Urs Räber	Switzerland	15		2	-	-	-	6	3	1	3	-	-
	Silvano Meli	Switzerland	15		-	-	-	4	-	-	-	-	11	-
27	Chris Kent	Canada	12		12	-	-	-	-	-	-	-	-	-
	Andy Mill	United States	12		-	-	12	-	-	-	-	-	-	-
	Erwin Josi	Switzerland	12		-	9	-	-	-	-	2	1	-	-
	Doug Powell	United States	12		5	-	-	-	-	-	-	-	-	7
	Giuliano Giardini	Italy	12		-	-	-	-	-	10	-	-	-	2
32	Phil Mahre	United States	10		-	-	-	-	3	7	-	-	-	-
33	Andreas Wenzel	Liechtenstein	9		-	1	-	-	-	-	-	8	-	-
34	Peter Lüscher	Switzerland	7		-	7	-	-	-	-	-	-	-	-
35	Hubert Nachbauer	Austria	6		-	-	-	-	-	-	-	6	-	-
36	Philippe Pugnat	France	4		4	-	-	-	-	-	-	-	-	-
37	Siegfried Kerschbaumer	Italy	3		2	-	-	-	-	1	-	-	-	-
38	Gérard Rambaud	France	2		-	-	-	-	-	2	-	-	-	-
	Hans Enn	Austria	2		-	-	-	-	-	-	-	2	-	-
40	Karl Anderson	United States	1		-	-	-	1	-	-	-	-	-	-

== Men's downhill team results ==
All points were shown including individuel deduction. bold indicate highest score - italics indicate race wins

Place	Country	Total points	1 (France)	4 (Italy)	6 (Italy)	7 (Switzerland)	11 (Germany)	15 (Austria)	18 (Switzerland)	21 (Austria)	29 (United States)	30 (United States)	Racers	Wins
1	Austria	597	33	67	70	61	49	47	50	**82**	68	70	12	4
2	Switzerland	309	8	44	25	25	37	31	45	23	32	39	9	2
3	Canada	264	67	22	21	39	31	25	15	15	9	20	5	3
4	Soviet Union	81	10	-	-	12	-	4	23	7	25	-	2	1
5	United States	55	15	-	12	1	3	7	5	-	5	7	5	0
6	Italy	44	2	-	3	-	10	23	-	4	-	2	3	0
7	West Germany	21	-	5	8	-	8	-	-	-	-	-	1	0
8	Liechtenstein	9	-	1	-	-	-	-	-	8	-	-	1	0
9	France	6	4	-	-	-	-	2	-	-	-	-	2	0
