= 1979 Alpine Skiing World Cup – Men's downhill =

1979 Men's downhill World Cup
Previous: 1978	Next: 1980

Men's downhill World Cup 1978/1979

== Final point standings ==
In men's downhill World Cup 1978/79 the best 5 results count. Seven racers had a point deduction, which are given in "()" (brackets).

Place	Name	Country	Total points	Deduction	2 (Austria)	5 (Italy)	6 (Italy)	9 (France)	12 (Switzerland)	16 (Austria)	20 (Germany)	23 (Switzerland)	29 (United States)
1	Peter Müller	Switzerland	109	(6)	-	20	20	(2)	20	-	(4)	25	24
2	Peter Wirnsberger	Austria	89	(2)	8	(2)	11	-	-	20	25	-	25
3	Toni Bürgler	Switzerland	80		-	11	-	-	25	2	-	22	20
4	Uli Spieß	Austria	75	(2)	-	-	4	15	-	15	20	(2)	21
	Ken Read	Canada	75		25	-	15	-	15	1	-	-	19
6	Leonhard Stock	Austria	67		-	-	-	-	6	4	11	24	22
7	Herbert Plank	Italy	65	(4)	11	(4)	-	20	-	8	15	-	11
8	Werner Grissmann	Austria	63	(6)	-	-	-	6	11	6	(6)	23	17
	Sepp Ferstl	West Germany	63	(1)	(1)	-	-	3	-	25	8	14	13
10	Dave Murray	Canada	52		20	-	3	-	2	-	-	4	23
	Steve Podborski	Canada	52	(1)	2	(1)	-	25	4	3	-	-	18
12	Erik Håker	Norway	41		-	-	25	-	-	-	-	-	16
13	Josef Walcher	Austria	40		-	25	-	-	-	-	-	15	-
14	Vladimir Makeev	Soviet Union	35		15	6	-	-	-	-	-	-	14
15	Urs Räber	Switzerland	27		-	-	-	-	-	-	-	19	8
16	Philippe Roux	Switzerland	26		-	-	-	-	8	-	-	18	-
17	Walter Vesti	Switzerland	25		-	15	1	-	-	-	-	-	9
	Erwin Josi	Switzerland	25		-	-	-	4	1	11	-	5	4
19	Franz Klammer	Austria	23		-	8	8	-	-	-	-	-	7
20	Reinhard Schmalzl	Italy	21		-	-	-	-	-	-	-	21	-
	Harti Weirather	Austria	21		-	-	-	-	-	-	-	6	15
22	Olindo Cozzio	Italy	20		-	-	-	-	-	-	-	20	-
23	Jean-Marc Muffat	France	18		-	-	-	11	-	-	-	7	-
	Michael Veith	West Germany	18		-	3	-	-	-	-	2	11	2
25	Bruno Fretz	Switzerland	17		-	-	-	-	-	-	-	17	-
26	Lorenzo Cancian	Italy	16		-	-	-	-	-	-	-	16	-
27	Karl Anderson	United States	15		-	-	-	-	-	-	3	-	12
28	Renato Antonioli	Italy	14		-	-	6	8	-	-	-	-	-
	Erwin Resch	Austria	14		-	-	-	-	-	-	-	11	3
30	Hubert Nachbauer	Austria	13		-	-	-	-	-	-	-	13	-
31	Mike Farny	United States	12		-	-	-	-	-	-	-	12	-
32	Giuliano Giardini	Italy	11		6	-	2	-	3	-	-	-	-
33	Anton Steiner	Austria	10		-	-	-	-	-	-	1	9	-
	Hans Kirchgasser	Austria	10		-	-	-	-	-	-	-	-	10
	Dave Irwin	Canada	10		4	-	-	-	-	-	-	-	6
36	Johnny Vicari	Italy	8		-	-	-	-	-	-	-	8	-
37	Andy Mill	United States	5		-	-	-	-	-	-	-	-	5
38	Sepp Burcher	Switzerland	4		-	-	-	-	-	-	-	4	-
39	Klaus Happacher	Italy	3		3	-	-	-	-	-	-	-	-
40	Doug Powell	United States	1		-	-	-	1	-	-	-	-	-
	Silvano Meli	Switzerland	1		-	-	-	-	-	-	-	1	-
	Valeri Tsyganov	Soviet Union	1		-	-	-	-	-	-	-	-	1

Alpine Skiing World Cup
Men

Overall | Downhill | Giant slalom | Slalom | Combined

1979
