= 1982 Alpine Skiing World Cup – Men's downhill =

1982 Men's downhill World Cup
Previous: 1981	Next: 1983

Men's downhill World Cup 1981/1982

== Calendar ==
Round	Race No	Place	Country	Date	Winner	Second	Third
1	1	Val d'Isère	France	December 3, 1981	(Austria) Franz Klammer	(Switzerland) Peter Müller	(Switzerland) Toni Bürgler
2	5	Val Gardena	Italy	December 13, 1981	(Austria) Erwin Resch	(United Kingdom) Konrad Bartelski	(Austria) Leonhard Stock
3	9	Crans Montana	Switzerland	December 21, 1981	(Canada) Steve Podborski	(Switzerland) Peter Müller	(Canada) Ken Read
4	12	Kitzbühel	Austria	January 15, 1982	(Austria) Harti Weirather	(Canada) Steve Podborski	(Canada) Ken Read
5	14	Kitzbühel	Austria	January 16, 1982	(Canada) Steve Podborski	(Austria) Franz Klammer	(Canada) Ken Read
6	17	Wengen	Switzerland	January 23, 1982	(Austria) Harti Weirather	(Austria) Erwin Resch	(Austria) Peter Wirnsberger
7	21	Garmisch-Partenkirchen	West Germany	February 13, 1982	(Canada) Steve Podborski	(Switzerland) Conradin Cathomen	(Austria) Harti Weirather
8	24	Whistler Mountain	Canada	February 27, 1982	(Switzerland) Peter Müller	(Canada) Steve Podborski	(Canada) Dave Irwin
9	25	Aspen	United States	March 5, 1982	(Switzerland) Peter Müller	(Austria) Harti Weirather	(Switzerland) Conradin Cathomen
10	26	Aspen	United States	March 6, 1982	(Switzerland) Peter Müller	(Canada) Todd Brooker	(Austria) Helmut Höflehner

== Final point standings ==
In men's downhill World Cup 1981/82 the best 5 results count. Deductions are given in (). The same tie-breaking rule in effect in 1977 were still in effect—best sixth score. Thus, Canada's Steve Podborski was awarded the season title and discipline trophy over two-time winner Peter Müller by having a better sixth score (12, for a fourth-place finish, compared to 10, for a sixth-place finish).

Place	Name	Country	Total points	Deduction	1 (France)	5 (Italy)	9 (Switzerland)	12 (Austria)	14 (Austria)	17 (Switzerland)	21 (Germany)	24 (Canada)	25 (United States)	26 (United States)
1	Steve Podborski	Canada	115	(33)	(12)	(12)	25	20	25	(5)	25	20	(2)	(2)
2	Peter Müller	Switzerland	115	(27)	20	-	20	(10)	-	(7)	(10)	25	25	25
3	Harti Weirather	Austria	97	(33)	(8)	(5)	(11)	25	(9)	25	15	-	20	12
4	Erwin Resch	Austria	76	(9)	9	25	-	12	10	20	-	(5)	-	(4)
5	Franz Klammer	Austria	71	(4)	25	9	-	5	20	12	-	(4)	-	-
6	Ken Read	Canada	65	(8)	11	-	15	15	15	-	-	9	(8)	-
7	Toni Bürgler	Switzerland	54	(9)	15	7	(7)	11	11	(2)	-	10	-	-
8	Peter Wirnsberger	Austria	53	(11)	10	8	12	(4)	(1)	15	(5)	8	(1)	-
9	Helmut Höflehner	Austria	51	(6)	(2)	-	-	8	(4)	8	9	-	11	15
10	Franz Heinzer	Switzerland	50	(7)	-	(1)	10	(6)	12	11	7	-	10	-
11	Leonhard Stock	Austria	49		-	15	-	-	8	10	12	-	4	-
12	Conradin Cathomen	Switzerland	46		1	-	-	-	7	-	20	-	15	3
13	Gustav Oehrli	Switzerland	45	(7)	-	-	5	9	(3)	-	(4)	12	9	10
14	Todd Brooker	Canada	43	(3)	-	2	(2)	3	-	-	(1)	11	7	20
15	Silvano Meli	Switzerland	42	(4)	7	6	-	(2)	-	-	6	(2)	12	11
16	Gerhard Pfaffenbichler	Austria	27	(2)	7	5	-	-	6	3	(2)	-	-	6
	Dave Irwin	Canada	27		-	-	-	-	-	-	-	15	3	9
18	Josef Walcher	Austria	26		5	-	9	-	-	1	-	6	-	5
19	Konrad Bartelski	United Kingdom	25		-	20	1	-	-	-	3	-	-	1
20	Valeri Tsyganov	Soviet Union	24		4	-	-	7	-	-	-	-	5	8
21	Michael Mair	Italy	17		-	-	6	-	-	-	11	-	-	-
22	Vladimir Makeev	Soviet Union	15		3	-	8	-	-	4	-	-	-	-
23	Mauro Cornaz	Italy	11		-	11	-	-	-	-	-	-	-	-
24	Bernhard Flaschberger	Austria	10		-	10	-	-	-	-	-	-	-	-
25	Urs Räber	Switzerland	9		-	-	-	-	-	9	-	-	-	-
	Phil Mahre	United States	9		-	-	-	-	2	-	-	-	-	7
27	Peter Lüscher	Switzerland	8		-	-	-	-	-	-	8	-	-	-
28	Paul Mahre	United States	7		-	-	-	-	-	-	-	7	-	-
29	Ulrich Spieß	Austria	6		-	-	-	-	-	6	-	-	-	-
	Walter Vesti	Switzerland	6		-	-	-	-	-	-	-	-	6	-
31	Dave Murray	Canada	5		-	-	-	-	5	-	-	-	-	-
32	Philippe Verneret	France	4		-	-	4	-	-	-	-	-	-	-
33	Doug Powell	United States	3		-	3	-	-	-	-	-	-	-	-
	Oskar Delago	Italy	3		-	-	3	-	-	-	-	-	-	-
	Bob Styan	Canada	3		-	-	-	-	-	-	-	3	-	-
36	Bruno Fretz	Switzerland	1		-	-	-	1	-	-	-	-	-	-
	Karl Alpiger	Switzerland	1		-	-	-	-	-	-	-	1	-	-

== Men's downhill team results ==
All points were shown including individuel deduction. bold indicate highest score - italics indicate race wins

Place	Country	Total points	1 (France)	5 (Italy)	9 (Switzerland)	12 (Austria)	14 (Austria)	17 (Switzerland)	21 (Germany)	24 (Canada)	25 (United States)	26 (United States)	Racers	Wins
1	Austria	531	66	77	32	54	58	**100**	43	23	36	42	10	4
2	Switzerland	431	43	14	42	39	33	29	55	50	77	49	11	3
3	Canada	302	23	14	42	38	45	5	26	58	20	31	6	3
4	Soviet Union	39	7	-	8	7	-	4	-	-	5	8	2	0
5	Italy	31	-	11	9	-	-	-	11	-	-	-	3	0
6	United Kingdom	25	-	20	1	-	-	-	3	-	-	1	1	0
7	United States	19	-	3	-	-	2	-	-	7	-	7	3	0
8	France	4	-	-	4	-	-	-	-	-	-	-	1	0

**Alpine Skiing World Cup**
**Men**

Overall | Downhill | Giant slalom | Slalom | Combined

**1982**
