= Alpine skiing at the 1980 Winter Olympics – Men's downhill =

Men's downhill at the XIII Olympic Winter Games
- Alpine skiing
- Venue: Whiteface Mountain; Wilmington, New York, U.S.
- Date: February 14, 1980
- Competitors: 47 from 22 nations
- Winning time: 1:45.50

Medalists
| 1st place, gold medalist(s) | | Leonhard Stock | Austria |
| 2nd place, silver medalist(s) | | Peter Wirnsberger | Austria |
| 3rd place, bronze medalist(s) | | Steve Podborski | Canada |

Men's Downhill
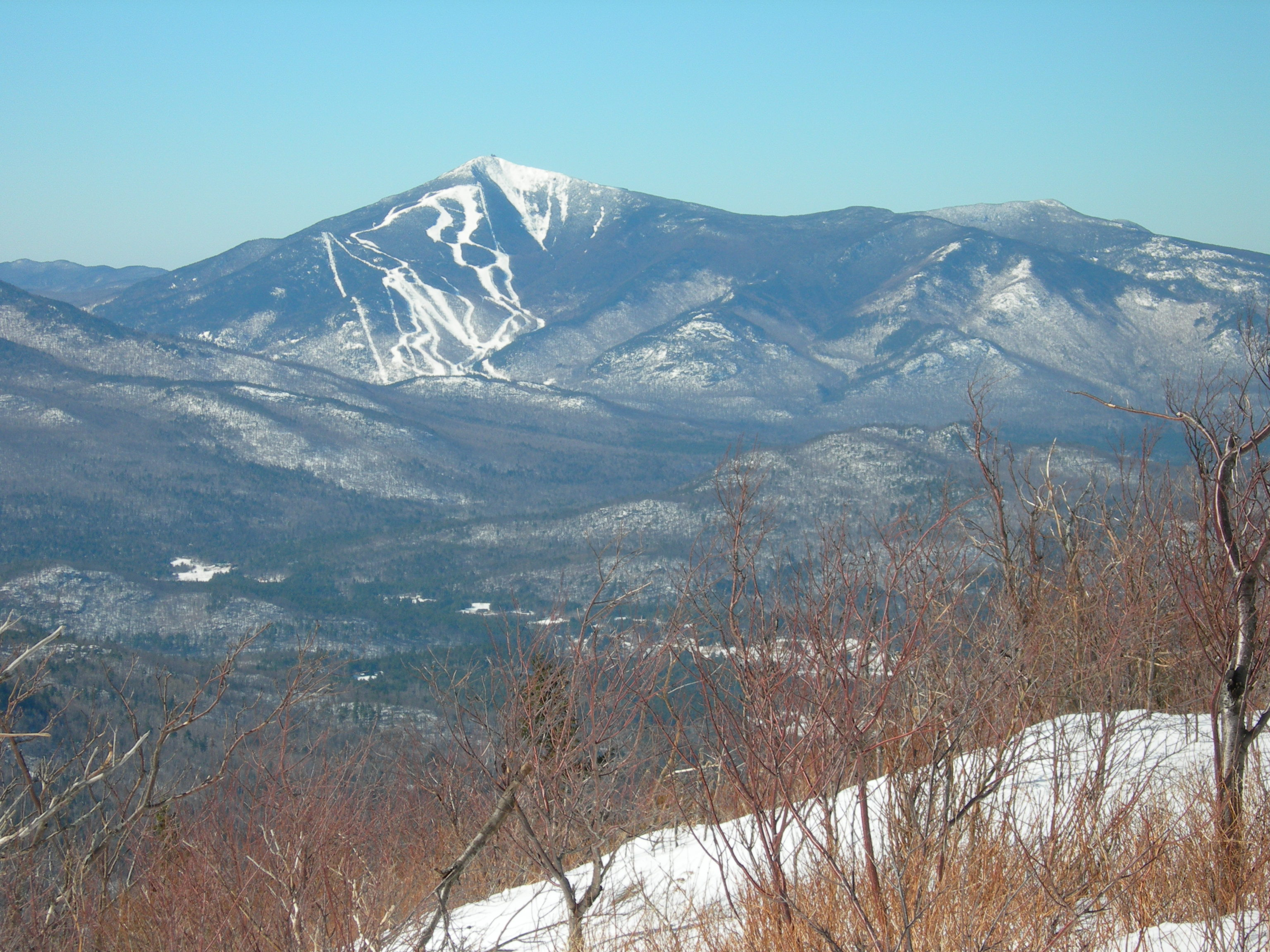
- Location: Whiteface Mountain
- Vertical: 832 m (2,730 ft)
- Top elevation: 1,313 m (4,308 ft)
- Base elevation: 481 m (1,578 ft)

The Men's Downhill competition of the 1980 Winter Olympics at Lake Placid was held at Whiteface Mountain on Thursday, February 14.

The defending world champion was Josef Walcher of Austria, while Switzerland's Peter Müller was the defending World Cup downhill champion and led the 1980 World Cup. Defending Olympic champion Franz Klammer did not compete; he was not selected to the Austrian Olympic team in 1980.

Gold medalist Leonhard Stock was an alternate on the Austrian downhill team, at the Olympics for the slalom. His fast training times earned him a spot on the four-man team, displacing Walcher, the reigning world champion. All four Austrians in the race finished in the top ten and Müller was fourth.

The course started at an elevation of 1,313 m (4,308 ft) above sea level with a vertical drop of 832 m (2,730 ft) and a length of 3.009 km (1.87 mi). Stock's winning time was 105.50 seconds, yielding an average speed of 102.677 km/h (63.8 mph), with an average vertical descent rate of 7.886 m/s (25.9 ft/s).

== Results ==
The race was started at 11:30 local time, (UTC −5). At the starting gate, the skies were broken overcast and snowing, the temperature was −10.0 °C (14.0 °F), wind speed was 53 km/h (33 mph) and the snow condition was hard packed.

| Rank | Bib | Name | Country | Time | Difference |
|---|---|---|---|---|---|
| 1st place, gold medalist(s) | 9 | Leonhard Stock | Austria | 1:45.50 | - |
| 2nd place, silver medalist(s) | 13 | Peter Wirnsberger | Austria | 1:46.12 | +0.62 |
| 3rd place, bronze medalist(s) | 15 | Steve Podborski | Canada | 1:46.62 | +1.12 |
| 4 | 10 | Peter Müller | Switzerland | 1:46.75 | +1.25 |
| 5 | 23 | Pete Patterson | United States | 1:47.04 | +1.54 |
| 6 | 3 | Herbert Plank | Italy | 1:47.13 | +1.63 |
| 7 | 12 | Werner Grissmann | Austria | 1:47.21 | +1.71 |
| 8 | 19 | Valeri Tsyganov | Soviet Union | 1:47.34 | +1.84 |
| 9 | 1 | Harti Weirather | Austria | 1:47.70 | +2.20 |
| 10 | 11 | Dave Murray | Canada | 1:47.95 | +2.45 |
| 11 | 16 | Dave Irwin | Canada | 1:48.12 | +2.62 |
| 12 | 27 | Konrad Bartelski | Great Britain | 1:48.53 | +3.03 |
| 13 | 30 | Bohumír Zeman | Czechoslovakia | 1:48.65 | +3.15 |
| 14 | 25 | Phil Mahre | United States | 1:48.88 | +3.38 |
| 15 | 6 | Giuliano Giardini | Italy | 1:48.98 | +3.48 |
| 16 | 21 | Andy Mill | United States | 1:49.07 | +3.57 |
| 17 | 5 | Erik Håker | Norway | 1:49.09 | +3.59 |
| 18 | 17 | Urs Räber | Switzerland | 1:49.16 | +3.66 |
| 19 | 26 | Arnt Erik Dale | Norway | 1:49.26 | +3.76 |
| 20 | 20 | Andreas Wenzel | Liechtenstein | 1:49.71 | +4.21 |
| 21 | 22 | Mikio Katagiri | Japan | 1:49.77 | +4.27 |
| 22 | 4 | Vladimir Makeev | Soviet Union | 1:49.87 | +4.37 |
| 23 | 2 | Michael Veith | West Germany | 1:50.00 | +4.50 |
| 24 | 7 | Erwin Josi | Switzerland | 1:50.03 | +4.53 |
| 25 | 24 | Philippe Pugnat | France | 1:50.13 | +4.63 |
| 26 | 28 | Antony Guss | Australia | 1:50.22 | +4.72 |
| 27 | 29 | Francisco Fernández Ochoa | Spain | 1:50.69 | +5.19 |
| 28 | 32 | Ross Blyth | Great Britain | 1:51.12 | +5.62 |
| 29 | 31 | David Cargill | Great Britain | 1:52.02 | +6.52 |
| 30 | 33 | Alan Stewart | Great Britain | 1:53.41 | +7.91 |
| 31 | 36 | Norberto Quiroga | Argentina | 1:54.31 | +8.81 |
| 32 | 35 | Stuart Blakely | New Zealand | 1:55.41 | +9.91 |
| 33 | 34 | Henri Mollin | Belgium | 1:55.83 | +10.33 |
| 34 | 37 | Didier Lamont | Belgium | 1:57.57 | +12.07 |
| 35 | 47 | Carlos Font | Andorra | 1:57.81 | +12.31 |
| 36 | 46 | Marcelo Martínez | Argentina | 1:58.04 | +12.54 |
| 37 | 38 | Janez Flere | Argentina | 1:59.01 | +13.51 |
| 38 | 43 | Guillermo Giumelli | Argentina | 2:00.10 | +14.60 |
| 39 | 39 | Miguel Font | Andorra | 2:02.01 | +16.51 |
| 40 | 41 | Hong In-gi | South Korea | 2:03.08 | +17.58 |
| 41 | 45 | Arturo Kinch | Costa Rica | 2:12.24 | +26.74 |
| 42 | 44 | Billy Farwig | Bolivia | 2:12.66 | +27.16 |
| - | 40 | Patrick Toussaint | Andorra | DNF | - |
| - | 18 | Karl Anderson | United States | DNF | - |
| - | 14 | Ken Read | Canada | DNF | - |
| - | 8 | Toni Bürgler | Switzerland | DNF | - |
| - | 42 | Scott Alan Sánchez | Bolivia | DQ | - |
