= 1978 Alpine Skiing World Cup – Men's downhill =

1978 Men's downhill World Cup
| Previous: 1977 | Next: 1979 |

Men's downhill World Cup 1977/1978

== Final point standings ==
In men's downhill World Cup 1977/78 the best 5 results count. Four racers had a point deduction, which are given in brackets. For the very first time there was a shared win, when Josef Walcher and Sepp Ferstl tied in the second race at Kitzbühel. Franz Klammer won his fourth Downhill World Cup in a row - this record is still unbeaten.

| Place | Name | Country | Total points | Deduction | 2 (France) | 5 (Italy) | 6 (Italy) | 12 (Austria) | 13 (Austria) | 15 (France) | 20 (Switzerland) | 21 (Switzerland) |
|---|---|---|---|---|---|---|---|---|---|---|---|---|
| 1 | Franz Klammer | Austria | 96 | (14) | 25 | 15 | (3) | 11 | (11) | - | 20 | 25 |
| 2 | Josef Walcher | Austria | 74 | (3) | 15 | 3 | - | 25 | 25 | 6 | - | (3) |
| 3 | Herbert Plank | Italy | 73 | | 20 | 25 | 25 | 3 | - | - | - | - |
| 4 | Ken Read | Canada | 56 | (2) | 11 | - | (2) | - | 3 | 25 | 6 | 11 |
| 5 | Sepp Ferstl | West Germany | 49 | | 8 | - | - | - | 25 | - | 8 | 8 |
| 6 | Uli Spieß | Austria | 47 | | 3 | 2 | - | - | 2 | - | 25 | 15 |
| 7 | Michael Veith | West Germany | 45 | | - | 11 | - | - | 15 | 15 | 4 | - |
| 8 | Peter Wirnsberger | Austria | 43 | | - | 20 | 15 | 4 | - | 4 | - | - |
| 9 | Werner Grissmann | Austria | 39 | (4) | 6 | 8 | (4) | 8 | 6 | 11 | - | - |
| | Erik Håker | Norway | 39 | | 2 | - | - | - | - | 2 | 15 | 20 |
| 11 | Walter Vesti | Switzerland | 24 | | - | - | - | 20 | 4 | - | - | - |
| 12 | Bernhard Russi | Switzerland | 20 | | - | - | 20 | - | - | - | - | - |
| | Dave Murray | Canada | 20 | | - | - | - | - | - | 20 | - | - |
| 14 | Klaus Eberhard | Austria | 19 | | - | 6 | 11 | 2 | - | - | - | - |
| 15 | Steve Podborski | Canada | 18 | | - | - | - | 1 | - | - | 11 | 6 |
| 16 | Renato Antonioli | Italy | 16 | | - | - | - | 15 | 1 | - | - | - |
| 17 | Bartl Gensbichler | Austria | 14 | | - | - | 8 | - | - | - | - | 6 |
| 18 | Peter Müller | Switzerland | 13 | | 4 | - | 1 | - | 8 | - | - | - |
| 19 | Philippe Roux | Switzerland | 12 | | - | - | - | 6 | - | 3 | 2 | 1 |
| 20 | Erwin Josi | Switzerland | 10 | | - | 1 | 6 | - | - | - | 1 | 2 |
| 21 | Patrice Pellat-Finet | France | 8 | | - | - | - | - | - | 8 | - | - |
| 22 | Leonhard Stock | Austria | 5 | | 1 | - | - | - | - | - | 3 | 1 |
| 23 | Gustav Thöni | Italy | 4 | | - | 4 | - | - | - | - | - | - |
| 24 | Silvano Meli | Switzerland | 1 | | - | - | - | - | - | 1 | - | - |

Alpine Skiing World Cup
Men

Overall | Downhill | Giant slalom | Slalom

1978
