= Saslong =

Ski course in Italy

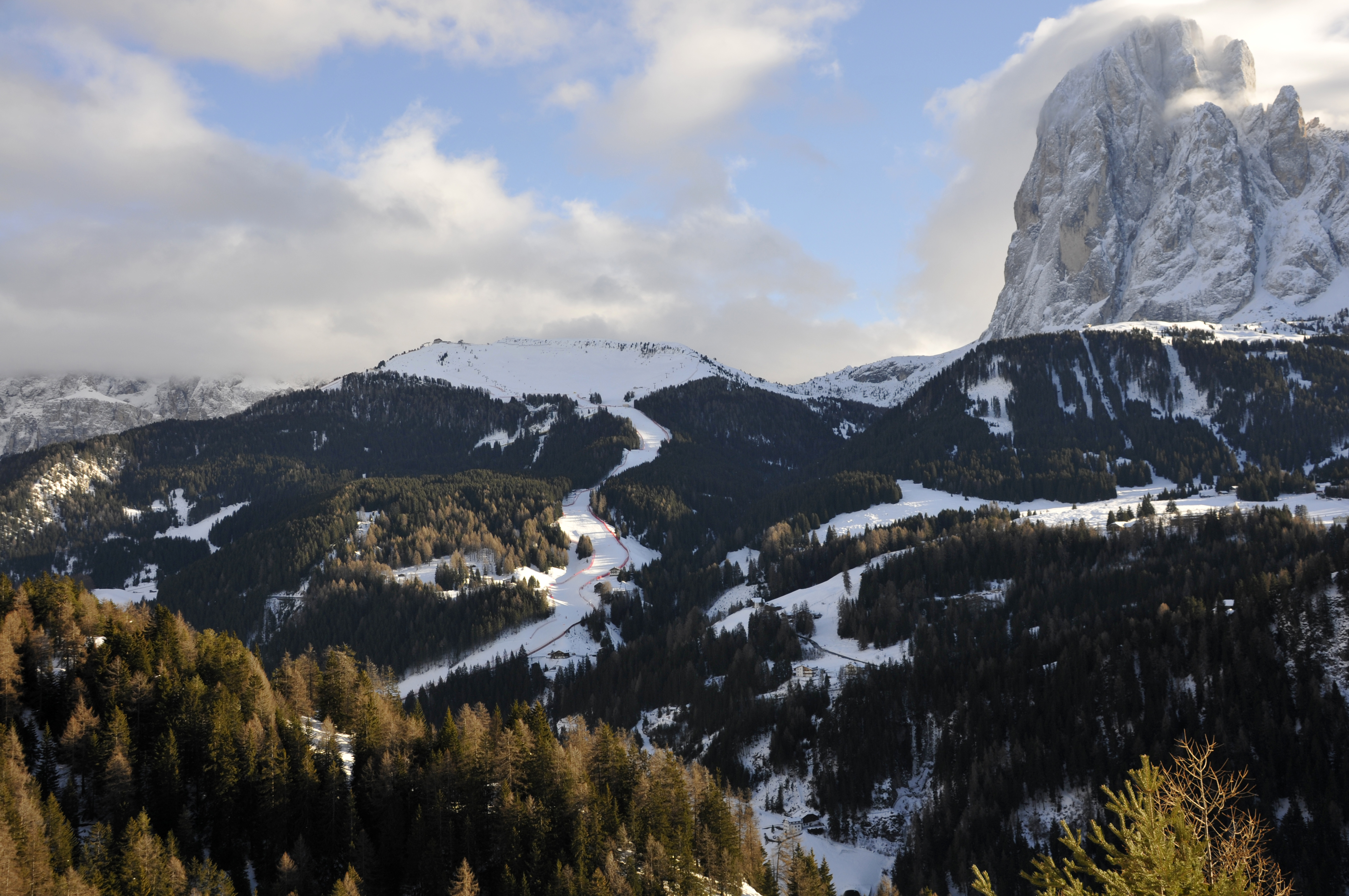
- Interactive map of Saslong
- Location within Italy Location within Alps Location within Europe
- 46°33′22″N 11°43′48″E
- Location: South Tyrol, Italy
- Mountain: Langkofel, Dolomites
- Opened: 1969; 57 years ago
- Member: Club5+
- Level: expert

Downhill
- Start: 2,249 m (7,379 ft) (AA)
- Finish: 1,410 m (4,626 ft)
- Vertical drop: 839 m (2,753 ft)
- Length: 3.446 km (2.14 mi)
- Max incline: 29.6 degrees (56.9%)
- Avg incline: 13.8 degrees (24.5%)
- Min incline: 6.4 degrees (11.2%)
- Most Wins (M): (Austria) Franz Klammer (4x) (Italy) Kristian Ghedina (4x)
- Most Wins (W): (Slovenia) Ilka Štuhec (1x)

Super-G
- Start: 2,000 m (6,562 ft) (AA)
- Finish: 1,410 m (4,626 ft)
- Vertical drop: 590 m (1,936 ft)
- Length: 2.365 km (1.47 mi)
- Max incline: 29.6 degrees (56.9%)
- Avg incline: 14.0 degrees (24.9%)
- Min incline: 6.5 degrees (11.4%)
- Most Wins (M): (Norway) Aksel Lund Svindal (5x)
- Most Wins (W): (Slovenia) Ilka Štuhec (1x)

Saslong is a World Cup downhill ski course in northern Italy, just above Val Gardena/Gröden in the South Tyrol. Located on the Langkofel in the Dolomites, the race course made its World Cup debut in February 1969. The ski course is named after the mountain Saslonch (German: Langkofel, Italian: Sassolungo) with an adapted spelling.

Franz Klammer and Kristian Ghedina won record 4 downhills and Aksel Lund Svindal record 5 super-G's.

== Course sections ==
=== Spinel ===
This section starts as a very difficult jump short after the start, into the steepest section (56.9% gradient), then virtual change direction in mid-air to compression.

=== Saut dl Moro ===
A forty-metre (130 ft) jump which takes skiers into the second compression.

=== Muri di Sochers ===
This section starts as a Fifteen-to-twenty-metre (49 to 66 ft) jump in the air, followed by a flat, yet intense, left-right-left gate combination ending at the 1st Mauer ("Wall").

Skiers jump ca. 35 metres (115 ft) directly to the 1st Mauer and have to sway to the right to the 2nd Mauer.

The jump on the 2nd Mauer contemporaneously serves as the entry into the flat section leading to the first Camel Hump with top speed at about 130 km/h (81 mph).

=== Gobbe del Cammello (Camel Humps) ===
The Camel Humps represent the most spectacular section of the Saslong. They were named by the late and former Austrian FIS TD Sepp Sulzberger. Uli Spiess from Austria was the first athlete to attempt and succeed in jumping all three Humps at the same time instead of taking each jump separately.

Since Spiess' premiere, skiers today mostly absorb the first jump (a.k.a. "Girardelli Line") and leap from the second over the third. The record jump belongs to Austrian skier Michael Walchhofer who leaped 88 metres (289 ft) reaching a height of 4–5 meters in 2003.

=== Ciaslat ===
This section, with its corrugated ripples and bumps, is often where the race is decided. Racers encounter 17 ripples in this technically demanding part of the course.

=== Nucia (Tunnel) ===
Skiers take the Nucia jump into the final schuss following the exit from Ciaslat.

=== Schuss ===
The last and finals section of the course starts with jump that owes its name to the new tunnel that runs below the Final schuss and is part of the new street by-passing St.Christina which was opened in 2009.

== World Cup ==
The first downhill winner in 1969 was Jean-Daniel Dätwyler (SUI), and this annual ski event is part of the prestigious Saslong Classic competition. Saslong hosted the World Championships in 1970, which also counted for 1970 World Cup season points and wins/podiums statistics.

On 23 March 1975, Saslong hosted the first parallel slalom in history, Gustav Thöni won in front of 40,000, beating Ingemar Stenmark in the final.

Franjo von Allmen won the most recent men's downhill in late December 2025; the full course was used at 3.446 km (2.14 mi) in length, with a vertical drop of 839 m (2,753 ft) from a starting elevation of 2,249 m (7,379 ft). His winning time of 118.67 seconds yielded an average speed of 104.539 km/h (65.0 mph) and an average vertical descent rate of 7.070 m/s (23.2 ft/s).

Downhill start	Upper section 1	Upper section 2	Intermediate section
300x	300x	300x	300x
Werner Heel (2013)	Bode Miller (2006)	Final section	Finish area
300x	300x	300x	300x

=== Men ===
Event Key: DH – Downhill, SG – Super Giant Slalom, KB – Combined, PS – Parallel Slalom
No.	Type	Season	Date	Winner	Second	Third
51	DH	1968/69	14 February 1969	(Switzerland) Jean-Daniel Dätwyler	(France) Henri Duvillard	(Austria) Rudi Sailer
79	DH	1969/70	15 February 1970	(Switzerland) Bernhard Russi	(Austria) Karl Cordin	(Australia) Malcolm Milne
128	DH	1971/72	15 March 1972	(Switzerland) Bernhard Russi	(Switzerland) René Berthod	(United States) Mike Lafferty
135	DH	1972/73	15 February 1973	(Switzerland) Roland Collombin	(Austria) Karl Cordin	(Austria) David Zwilling
203	DH	1974/75	21 March 1975	(Austria) Franz Klammer	(Norway) Erik Håker	(Switzerland) Bernhard Russi
204	PS	1974/75	23 March 1975	(Italy) Gustav Thöni	(Sweden) Ingemar Stenmark	(Switzerland) Walter Tresch
232	DH	1976/77	17 December 1976	(Austria) Franz Klammer	(Italy) Herbert Plank	(Norway) Erik Håker
233	DH	1976/77	18 December 1976	(Austria) Franz Klammer	(Austria) Josef Walcher	(Switzerland) Bernhard Russi
267	DH	1977/78	18 December 1977	(Italy) Herbert Plank	(Austria) Peter Wirnsberger I	(Austria) Franz Klammer
289	DH	1978/79	16 December 1978	(Austria) Josef Walcher	(Switzerland) Peter Müller	(Switzerland) Walter Vesti
290	DH	1978/79	17 December 1978	(Norway) Erik Håker	(Switzerland) Peter Müller	(Canada) Ken Read
323	DH	1979/80	17 December 1979	(Switzerland) Peter Müller	(Norway) Erik Håker	(Austria) Werner Grissmann
324	KB	1979/80	11 December 1979; Madonna di Cam. (SL) ---------------------------- 17 December 1979; Val Gardena (DH)	(Switzerland) Peter Lüscher	(Liechtenstein) Andreas Wenzel	(Austria) Anton Steiner
348	DH	1980/81	14 December 1980	(Switzerland) Peter Müller	(Austria) Harti Weirather	(Canada) Steve Podborski
349	KB	1980/81	9 December 1980; Madonna di Cam. (SL) ---------------------------- 14 December 1980; Val Gardena (DH)	(Switzerland) Peter Müller	(Austria) Leonhard Stock	(Liechtenstein) Andreas Wenzel
350	DH	1980/81	15 December 1980	(Austria) Harti Weirather	(Austria) Uli Spieß	(Switzerland) Peter Müller
385	DH	1981/82	13 December 1981	(Austria) Erwin Resch	(United Kingdom) Konrad Bartelski	(Austria) Leonhard Stock
386	KB	1981/82	9 December 1981; Madonna di Cam. (SL) ---------------------------- 13 December 1981; Val Gardena (DH)	(United States) Phil Mahre	(Liechtenstein) Andreas Wenzel	(Norway) Even Hole
417	DH	1982/83	19 December 1982	(Switzerland) Conradin Cathomen	(Austria) Erwin Resch	(Austria) Franz Klammer
418	KB	1982/83	12 December 1982; Val d'Isere (SG) ---------------------------- 19 December 1982; Val Gardena (DH)	(Switzerland) Franz Heinzer	(Switzerland) Peter Müller	(Switzerland) Peter Lüscher
419	DH	1982/83	20 December 1982	(Austria) Franz Klammer	(Switzerland) Peter Müller	(Switzerland) Urs Räber
458	DH	1983/84	18 December 1983	(Switzerland) Urs Räber	(Canada) Todd Brooker	(Canada) Steve Podborski
459	SG	1983/84	19 December 1983	(Switzerland) Pirmin Zurbriggen	(Switzerland) Martin Hangl	(Austria) Leonhard Stock
461	KB	1983/84	19 December 1983; Val Gardena (SG) ---------------------------- 20 December 1983; Madonna di Cam. (SL)	(Liechtenstein) Andreas Wenzel	(Switzerland) Thomas Bürgler	(Italy) Alex Giorgi
493	DH	1984/85	15 December 1984	(Austria) Helmut Höflehner	(Switzerland) Conradin Cathomen	(Austria) Peter Wirnsberger I
528	DH	1985/86	14 December 1985	(Austria) Peter Wirnsberger I	(Switzerland) Peter Müller	(West Germany) Sepp Wildgruber
530	KB	1985/86	14 December 1985; Val Gardena (DH) ---------------------------- 15 December 1985; Alta Badia (GS)	(Luxembourg) Marc Girardelli	(Sweden) Niklas Henning	(Switzerland) Pirmin Zurbriggen
575	DH	1986/87	13 December 1986	(Canada) Rob Boyd	(Italy) Michael Mair	(West Germany) Markus Wasmeier
606	DH	1987/88	12 December 1987	(Canada) Rob Boyd	(Switzerland) Pirmin Zurbriggen	(Canada) Brian Stemmle
636	DH	1988/89	9 December 1988	(Switzerland) Peter Müller	(Austria) Armin Assinger	(Canada) Rob Boyd
637	DH	1988/89	10 December 1988	(Austria) Helmut Höflehner	(Austria) Patrick Ortlieb	(Switzerland) Peter Müller
673	DH	1989/90	16 December 1989	(Switzerland) Pirmin Zurbriggen	(Switzerland) Franz Heinzer	(Italy) Kristian Ghedina
703	DH	1990/91	14 December 1990	(Switzerland) Franz Heinzer	(Germany) Berni Huber	(Norway) Atle Skårdal
704	DH	1990/91	15 December 1990	(Norway) Atle Skårdal	(Canada) Rob Boyd	(France) Luc Alphand
733	DH	1991/92	14 December 1991	(Switzerland) Franz Heinzer	(Austria) Leonhard Stock	(Norway) Atle Skårdal
764	DH	1992/93	11 December 1992	(Switzerland) William Besse	(Norway) Jan Einar Thorsen	(Austria) Patrick Ortlieb
765	DH	1992/93	12 December 1992	(Austria) Leonhard Stock	(Switzerland) William Besse	(United States) A J Kitt
801	DH	1993/94	17 December 1993	(Liechtenstein) Markus Foser	(Austria) Werner Franz	(Luxembourg) Marc Girardelli
802	DH	1993/94	18 December 1993	(Austria) Patrick Ortlieb	(Switzerland) Daniel Mahrer	(France) Jean-Luc Crétier
870	DH	1995/96	16 December 1995	(Austria) Patrick Ortlieb	(Switzerland) Xavier Gigandet	(France) Luc Alphand
904	DH	1996/97	20 December 1996	(France) Luc Alphand	(Norway) Atle Skårdal	(Italy) Kristian Ghedina
905	DH	1996/97	21 December 1996	(Italy) Kristian Ghedina	(France) Luc Alphand	(Austria) Josef Strobl
978	DH	1998/99	18 December 1998	(Norway) Lasse Kjus	(Austria) Werner Franz	(Austria) Hermann Maier
979	DH	1998/99	19 December 1998	(Italy) Kristian Ghedina	(Norway) Lasse Kjus	(Austria) Werner Franz
1013	DH	1999/00	17 December 1999	(Italy) Kristian Ghedina	(Austria) Josef Strobl	(Canada) Ed Podivinsky
1014	DH	1999/00	18 December 1999	(Austria) Andreas Schifferer	(Italy) Kristian Ghedina	(Austria) Hermann Maier
	DH	2000/01	16 December 2000	cancelled and replaced in Val-d'Isère on same dates		
	SG	2000/01	17 December 2000	cancelled and replaced in Val-d'Isère on same dates		
1085	DH	2001/02	14 December 2001	(Italy) Kristian Ghedina	(Norway) Lasse Kjus	(Italy) Kurt Sulzenbacher
1086	DH	2001/02	15 December 2001	(Austria) Stephan Eberharter	(Austria) Michael Walchhofer	(Norway) Kjetil André Aamodt
1123	SG	2002/03	20 December 2002	(Switzerland) Didier Défago	(Austria) Hannes Reichelt	(Liechtenstein) Marco Büchel
1124	DH	2002/03	21 December 2002	(France) Antoine Dénériaz	(Austria) Michael Walchhofer	(Austria) Josef Strobl
1160	SG	2003/04	19 December 2003	(Norway) Lasse Kjus	(Austria) Stephan Eberharter	(Austria) Hermann Maier
1161	DH	2003/04	20 December 2003	(France) Antoine Dénériaz	(Austria) Michael Walchhofer	(Austria) Hans Knauß
1199	SG	2004/05	17 December 2004	(Austria) Michael Walchhofer	(Austria) Hermann Maier	(Austria) Benjamin Raich
1200	DH	2004/05	18 December 2004	(Germany) Max Rauffer	(Switzerland) Jürg Grünenfelder	(Austria) Hans Grugger
1235	SG	2005/06	17 December 2005	(Austria) Hans Grugger	(Canada) Erik Guay	(Switzerland) Ambrosi Hoffmann
1236	DH	2005/06	17 December 2005	(Liechtenstein) Marco Büchel	(Austria) Michael Walchhofer	(Canada) Erik Guay
1270	SG	2006/07	15 December 2006	(United States) Bode Miller	(Austria) Christoph Gruber	(Canada) John Kucera
1271	DH	2006/07	16 December 2006	(United States) Steven Nyman	(Switzerland) Didier Cuche	(Austria) Fritz Strobl
1308	SG	2007/08	14 December 2007	(Switzerland) Didier Cuche	(United States) Bode Miller	(Liechtenstein) Marco Büchel
1309	DH	2007/08	15 December 2007	(Austria) Michael Walchhofer	(Switzerland) Didier Cuche	(United States) Scott Macartney
1347	SG	2008/09	19 December 2008	(Italy) Werner Heel	(Switzerland) Didier Défago	(Sweden) Patrik Järbyn
1348	DH	2008/09	20 December 2008	(Austria) Michael Walchhofer	(United States) Bode Miller	(Canada) Manuel Osborne-Paradis
1384	SG	2009/10	18 December 2009	(Norway) Aksel Lund Svindal	(Switzerland) Carlo Janka	(Italy) Patrick Staudacher
1385	DH	2009/10	19 December 2009	(Canada) Manuel Osborne-Paradis	(Austria) Mario Scheiber	(Switzerland) Ambrosi Hoffmann (France) Johan Clarey
1415	SG	2010/11	17 December 2010	(Austria) Michael Walchhofer	(Germany) Stephan Keppler	(Canada) Erik Guay
1416	DH	2010/11	18 December 2010	(Switzerland) Silvan Zurbriggen	(Austria) Romed Baumann	(Switzerland) Didier Cuche
1452	SG	2011/12	16 December 2011	(Switzerland) Beat Feuz	(United States) Bode Miller	(Norway) Kjetil Jansrud
	DH	2011/12	17 December 2011	cancelled after 21 skiers due to strong winds; replaced on 3 February 2012		
1497	SG	2012/13	14 December 2012	(Norway) Aksel Lund Svindal	(Italy) Matteo Marsaglia	(Italy) Werner Heel
1498	DH	2012/13	15 December 2012	(United States) Steven Nyman	(Slovenia) Rok Perko	(Canada) Erik Guay
1531	SG	2013/14	20 December 2013	(Norway) Aksel Lund Svindal	(Canada) Jan Hudec	(France) Adrien Théaux
1532	DH	2013/14	21 December 2013	(Canada) Erik Guay	(Norway) Kjetil Jansrud	(France) Johan Clarey
1565	DH	2014/15	19 December 2014	(United States) Steven Nyman	(Norway) Kjetil Jansrud	(Italy) Dominik Paris
1566	SG	2014/15	20 December 2014	(Norway) Kjetil Jansrud	(Italy) Dominik Paris	(Austria) Hannes Reichelt
1601	DH	2015/16	18 December 2015	(Norway) Aksel Lund Svindal	(Norway) Kjetil Jansrud	(Norway) Aleksander Aamodt Kilde
1602	SG	2015/16	19 December 2015	(Norway) Aksel Lund Svindal	(France) Guillermo Fayed	(Norway) Kjetil Jansrud
1644	SG	2016/17	16 December 2016	(Norway) Kjetil Jansrud	(Norway) Aleksander Aamodt Kilde	(Canada) Erik Guay
1645	DH	2016/17	17 December 2016	(Austria) Max Franz	(Norway) Aksel Lund Svindal	(United States) Steven Nyman
1681	SG	2017/18	15 December 2017	(Germany) Josef Ferstl	(Austria) Max Franz	(Austria) Matthias Mayer
1682	DH	2017/18	16 December 2017	(Norway) Aksel Lund Svindal	(Norway) Kjetil Jansrud	(Austria) Max Franz
1716	SG	2018/19	14 December 2018	(Norway) Aksel Lund Svindal	(Italy) Christof Innerhofer	(Norway) Kjetil Jansrud
1717	DH	2018/19	15 December 2018	(Norway) Aleksander Aamodt Kilde	(Austria) Max Franz	(Switzerland) Beat Feuz
1757	SG	2019/20	20 December 2019	(Austria) Vincent Kriechmayr	(Norway) Kjetil Jansrud	(Germany) Thomas Dreßen
	DH	2019/20	21 December 2019	heavy snowfall; replaced in Bormio on 27 December 2019		
1789	SG	2020/21	18 December 2020	(Norway) Aleksander Aamodt Kilde	(Switzerland) Mauro Caviezel	(Norway) Kjetil Jansrud
1790	DH	2020/21	19 December 2020	(Norway) Aleksander Aamodt Kilde	(United States) Ryan Cochran-Siegle	(Switzerland) Beat Feuz
1826	SG	2021/22	17 December 2021	(Norway) Aleksander Aamodt Kilde	(Austria) Matthias Mayer	(Austria) Vincent Kriechmayr
1827	DH	2021/22	18 December 2021	(United States) Bryce Bennett	(Austria) Otmar Striedinger	(Switzerland) Niels Hintermann
1862	DH	2022/23	15 December 2022	(Austria) Vincent Kriechmayr	(Switzerland) Marco Odermatt	(Austria) Matthias Mayer
	SG	2022/23	16 December 2022	cancelled due to bad weather conditions.		
1863	DH	2022/23	17 December 2022	(Norway) Aleksander Aamodt Kilde	(France) Johan Clarey	(Italy) Mattia Casse
1895	DH	2023/24	14 December 2023	(United States) Bryce Bennett	(Norway) Aleksander Aamodt Kilde	(Switzerland) Marco Odermatt
1896	SG	2023/24	15 December 2023	(Austria) Vincent Kriechmayr	(Austria) Daniel Hemetsberger	(Switzerland) Marco Odermatt
1897	DH	2023/24	16 December 2023	(Italy) Dominik Paris	(Norway) Aleksander Aamodt Kilde	(United States) Bryce Bennett
1936	SG	2024/25	20 December 2024	(Italy) Mattia Casse	(United States) Jared Goldberg	(Switzerland) Marco Odermatt
1937	DH	2024/25	21 December 2024	(Switzerland) Marco Odermatt	(Switzerland) Franjo von Allmen	(United States) Ryan Cochran-Siegle
1975	DH	2025/26	18 December 2025	(Switzerland) Marco Odermatt	(Switzerland) Franjo von Allmen	(Italy) Dominik Paris
1976	SG	2025/26	19 December 2025	(Czech Republic) Jan Zabystřan	(Switzerland) Marco Odermatt	(Italy) Giovanni Franzoni
1977	DH	2025/26	20 December 2025	(Switzerland) Franjo von Allmen	(Switzerland) Marco Odermatt	(Italy) Florian Schieder

World Championships, also counted for World Cup.
Not part of classic Saslong competition. It only replaced Lake Louise (2001), Beaver Creek (2022, 2025), Zermatt-Cervinia (2023)

=== Women ===
No.	Type	Season	Date	Winner	Second	Third
1611	DH	2018/19	18 December 2018	(Slovenia) Ilka Štuhec	(Liechtenstein) Tina Weirather (Austria) Nicole Schmidhofer	
1612	SG	2018/19	19 December 2018	(Slovenia) Ilka Štuhec	(Italy) Nicol Delago	(Austria) Ramona Siebenhofer

== Club5+ ==
In 1986, elite Club5 was originally founded by prestigious classic downhill organizers: Kitzbühel, Wengen, Garmisch, Val d’Isère and Val Gardena/Gröden, with goal to bring alpine ski sport on the highest levels possible.

Later over the years other classic longterm organizers joined the now named Club5+: Alta Badia, Cortina, Kranjska Gora, Maribor, Lake Louise, Schladming, Adelboden, Kvitfjell, St.Moritz and Åre.
