= 1978–79 FIS Alpine Ski World Cup =

International sports competition

FIS Alpine Ski World Cup 1978/79
Discipline	Men	Women
Overall	(Switzerland) Peter Lüscher	(Austria) Annemarie Moser-Pröll
Downhill	(Switzerland) Peter Müller	(Austria) Annemarie Moser-Pröll
Giant slalom	(Sweden) Ingemar Stenmark	(West Germany) Christa Kinshofer
Slalom	(Sweden) Ingemar Stenmark	(Austria) Regina Sackl
Nations Cup	Austria	Austria
- Nations Cup overall: Austria

Competition
Locations	18	14
Individual	33	26

The 13th World Cup season began in December 1978 in Austria and concluded in March 1979 in Japan.

The overall winners were Peter Lüscher of Switzerland, his first overall win, and Annemarie Moser-Pröll of Austria, her sixth (which remained the record until 2017–18, when Austria's Marcel Hirscher won his seventh overall title). Although Ingemar Stenmark did not win the overall title due to restrictions on the number of races that counted for overall championship points, he won 13 races during the season (including the last four in a row and six of the last seven) to break Jean-Claude Killy's record of 12 race wins during the inaugural season of the World Cup, which (as of 2018) still stands as the record for most wins by a male skier in a World Cup season.

The World Cup race scoring system, which had remained unchanged since the start of the World Cup in 1967 as a "Top 10" points system (ranging from 25 points for first, 20 for second, 15 for third, and down to 1 point for tenth), was amended this season for the final two downhills and the final three giant slaloms and slaloms to a "Top 25" system (ranging from 25 points for first to 1 point for 25th). This system was abandoned after the end of the season, and a new "Top 15" system was introduced beginning in 1980.

== Calendar ==
=== Men ===
Event key: DH – Downhill, SL – Slalom, GS – Giant slalom, KB – Combined, PS – Parallel slalom (Nations Cup ranking only)
Race	Season	Date	Place	Type	Winner	Second	Third
285	1	9 December 1978	(Austria) Schladming	GS _{092}	(Sweden) Ingemar Stenmark	(Switzerland) Peter Lüscher	(Italy) Leonardo David
286	2	10 December 1978	(Austria) Schladming	DH _{087}	(Canada) Ken Read	(Canada) Dave Murray	(Soviet Union) Vladimir Makeev
287	3	10 December 1978	(Austria) Schladming	KB _{010}	(Switzerland) Peter Lüscher	(Austria) Leonhard Stock	(Liechtenstein) Andreas Wenzel
288	4	13 December 1978	(Italy) Madonna di Campiglio	SL _{098}	(Switzerland) Martial Donnet	(Switzerland) Peter Lüscher	(West Germany) Christian Neureuther
Nations Cup		14 December 1978	(Italy) Madonna di Campiglio	PS _{ncr}	(Sweden) Ingemar Stenmark	(Italy) Mauro Bernardi	(Italy) Karl Trojer
289	5	16 December 1978	(Italy) Val Gardena	DH _{088}	(Austria) Josef Walcher	(Switzerland) Peter Müller	(Switzerland) Walter Vesti
290	6	17 December 1978	(Italy) Val Gardena	DH _{089}	(Norway) Erik Håker	(Switzerland) Peter Müller	(Canada) Ken Read
291	7	21 December 1978	(Socialist Federal Republic of Yugoslavia) Kranjska Gora	SL _{099}	(Sweden) Ingemar Stenmark	(Liechtenstein) Paul Frommelt	(Italy) Leonardo David
292	8	22 December 1978	(Socialist Federal Republic of Yugoslavia) Kranjska Gora	GS _{093}	(Sweden) Ingemar Stenmark	(Switzerland) Peter Lüscher	(Socialist Federal Republic of Yugoslavia) Bojan Križaj
293	9	6 January 1979	(France) Morzine	DH _{090}	(Canada) Steve Podborski	(Italy) Herbert Plank	(Austria) Uli Spieß
294	10	7 January 1979	(France) Courchevel	GS _{094}	(Sweden) Ingemar Stenmark	(Switzerland) Peter Lüscher	(Socialist Federal Republic of Yugoslavia) Bojan Križaj
295	11	9 January 1979	(Switzerland) Crans-Montana	SL _{100}	(West Germany) Christian Neureuther	(Bulgaria) Petar Popangelov	(Italy) Karl Trojer
296	12	14 January 1979	(Switzerland) Crans-Montana	DH _{091}	(Switzerland) Toni Bürgler	(Switzerland) Peter Müller	(Canada) Ken Read
297	13	15 January 1979	(Switzerland) Crans-Montana	SL _{101}	(Liechtenstein) Paul Frommelt	(Liechtenstein) Andreas Wenzel	(Sweden) Ingemar Stenmark
298	14	15 January 1979	(Switzerland) Crans-Montana	KB _{011}	(United States) Phil Mahre	(Liechtenstein) Andreas Wenzel	(Italy) Piero Gros
299	15	16 January 1979	(Switzerland) Adelboden	GS _{095}	(Sweden) Ingemar Stenmark	(Liechtenstein) Andreas Wenzel	(Switzerland) Jacques Lüthy
300	16	20 January 1979	(Austria) Kitzbühel	DH _{092}	(West Germany) Sepp Ferstl	(Austria) Peter Wirnsberger	(Austria) Uli Spieß
301	17	21 January 1979	(Austria) Kitzbühel	SL _{102}	(West Germany) Christian Neureuther	(Sweden) Ingemar Stenmark	(United States) Phil Mahre
302	18	21 January 1979	(Austria) Kitzbühel	KB _{012}	(Austria) Anton Steiner	(Liechtenstein) Andreas Wenzel	(Switzerland) Peter Lüscher
303	19	23 January 1979	(Austria) Steinach	GS _{096}	(Sweden) Ingemar Stenmark	(Switzerland) Peter Lüscher	(Liechtenstein) Andreas Wenzel
304	20	27 January 1979	(West Germany) Garmisch	DH _{093}	(Austria) Peter Wirnsberger	(Austria) Uli Spieß	(Italy) Herbert Plank
305	21	28 January 1979	(West Germany) Garmisch	SL _{103}	(Switzerland) Peter Lüscher	(United States) Phil Mahre	(Bulgaria) Petar Popangelov
306	22	28 January 1979	(West Germany) Garmisch	KB _{013}	(Switzerland) Peter Lüscher	(United States) Phil Mahre	(Liechtenstein) Andreas Wenzel
307	23	1 February 1979	(Switzerland) Villars	DH _{094}	(Switzerland) Peter Müller	(Austria) Leonhard Stock	(Austria) Werner Grissmann
308	24	4 February 1979	(Czechoslovakia) Jasná	GS _{097}	(Sweden) Ingemar Stenmark	(Socialist Federal Republic of Yugoslavia) Bojan Križaj	(Switzerland) Heini Hemmi
309	25	5 February 1979	(Czechoslovakia) Jasná	SL _{104}	(United States) Phil Mahre	(Italy) Leonardo David	(Sweden) Ingemar Stenmark
310	26	7 February 1979	(Norway) Oslo	SL _{105}	(Italy) Leonardo David	(Sweden) Ingemar Stenmark	(United States) Phil Mahre
311	27	10 February 1979	(Sweden) Åre	GS _{098}	(Sweden) Ingemar Stenmark	(United States) Phil Mahre	(Switzerland) Jacques Lüthy
312	28	11 February 1979	(Sweden) Åre	SL _{106}	(Sweden) Ingemar Stenmark	(United States) Phil Mahre	(Italy) Gustav Thöni
313	29	3 March 1979	(United States) Lake Placid	DH _{095}	(Austria) Peter Wirnsberger	(Switzerland) Peter Müller	(Canada) Dave Murray
314	30	4 March 1979	(United States) Lake Placid	GS _{099}	(Sweden) Ingemar Stenmark	(Austria) Hans Enn	(Switzerland) Peter Lüscher
315	31	12 March 1979	(United States) Heavenly Valley	GS _{100}	(Sweden) Ingemar Stenmark	(Socialist Federal Republic of Yugoslavia) Bojan Križaj	(Austria) Hans Enn
316	32	17 March 1979	(Japan) Furano	SL _{107}	(Sweden) Ingemar Stenmark	(West Germany) Christian Neureuther	(Liechtenstein) Paul Frommelt
317	33	19 March 1979	(Japan) Furano	GS _{101}	(Sweden) Ingemar Stenmark	(Switzerland) Heini Hemmi	(Switzerland) Jean-Luc Fournier

=== Women ===
Event key: DH – Downhill, SL – Slalom, GS – Giant slalom, KB – Combined
Race	Season	Date	Place	Type	Winner	Second	Third
273	1	9 December 1978	(Italy) Piancavallo	DH	(Austria) Annemarie Moser-Pröll	(Switzerland) Doris de Agostini	(Switzerland) Evelyne Dirren
274	2	10 December 1978	(Italy) Piancavallo	SL _{099}	(United States) Abbi Fisher	(France) Perrine Pelen	(Italy) Claudia Giordani (United States) Tamara McKinney
275	3	12 December 1978	(Italy) Piancavallo	GS _{090}	(Liechtenstein) Hanni Wenzel	(Switzerland) Marie-Theres Nadig	(West Germany) Irene Epple
276	4	17 December 1978	(France) Val d'Isère	DH _{077}	(Austria) Annemarie Moser-Pröll	(West Germany) Evi Mittermaier	(Switzerland) Bernadette Zurbriggen
277	5	18 December 1978	(France) Val d'Isère	GS _{091}	(West Germany) Christa Kinshofer	(Liechtenstein) Hanni Wenzel	(Switzerland) Marie-Theres Nadig
278	6	18 December 1978	(France) Val d'Isère	KB _{010}	(Switzerland) Marie-Theres Nadig	(Austria) Annemarie Moser-Pröll	(Liechtenstein) Hanni Wenzel
279	7	7 January 1979	(France) Les Gets	GS _{092}	(West Germany) Christa Kinshofer	(Liechtenstein) Hanni Wenzel	(Austria) Regina Sackl
280	8	8 January 1979	(France) Les Gets	SL _{100}	(Austria) Regina Sackl	(France) Perrine Pelen	(Austria) Annemarie Moser-Pröll
281	9	12 January 1979	(Switzerland) Les Diablerets	DH _{078}	(Austria) Annemarie Moser-Pröll	(West Germany) Evi Mittermaier	(Switzerland) Marie-Theres Nadig
282	10	17 January 1979	(Switzerland) Meiringen	DH _{079}	(Austria) Annemarie Moser-Pröll	(West Germany) Irene Epple	(Switzerland) Bernadette Zurbriggen
283	11	19 January 1979	(Switzerland) Meiringen	SL _{101}	(Austria) Regina Sackl	(Italy) Claudia Giordani	(Austria) Marie Kurz-Schlechter
284	12	19 January 1979	(Switzerland) Meiringen	KB _{011}	(Austria) Annemarie Moser-Pröll	(France) Fabienne Serrat	(Liechtenstein) Hanni Wenzel
285	13	23 January 1979	(Austria) Schruns	SL _{102}	(Austria) Lea Solkner	(Italy) Claudia Giordani	(Austria) Annemarie Moser-Pröll
286	14	26 January 1979	(Austria) Schruns	DH _{080}	(Austria) Annemarie Moser-Pröll	(United States) Cindy Nelson	(West Germany) Irene Epple
287	15	26 January 1979	(Austria) Schruns	KB _{012}	(Austria) Annemarie Moser-Pröll	(United States) Cindy Nelson	(Liechtenstein) Hanni Wenzel
288	16	27 January 1979	(Austria) Mellau	SL _{103}	(Italy) Maria Rosa Quario	(Austria) Annemarie Moser-Pröll	(France) Perrine Pelen
289	17	3 February 1979	(West Germany) Pfronten	SL _{104}	(Liechtenstein) Hanni Wenzel	(France) Fabienne Serrat	(Austria) Regina Sackl
290	18	4 February 1979	(West Germany) Pfronten	DH _{081}	(United States) Cindy Nelson	(France) Caroline Attia	(West Germany) Irene Epple
291	19	4 February 1979	(West Germany) Pfronten	KB _{013}	(Liechtenstein) Hanni Wenzel	(West Germany) Irene Epple	(United States) Cindy Nelson
292	20	6 February 1979	(West Germany) Berchtesgaden	GS _{093}	(West Germany) Christa Kinshofer	(West Germany) Irene Epple	(Austria) Annemarie Moser-Pröll
293	21	8 February 1979	(Socialist Federal Republic of Yugoslavia) Maribor	SL _{105}	(Liechtenstein) Hanni Wenzel	(West Germany) Christa Kinshofer	(Italy) Maria Rosa Quario
294	22	2 March 1979	(United States) Lake Placid	DH _{082}	(Austria) Annemarie Moser-Pröll	(Switzerland) Marie-Theres Nadig	(Switzerland) Bernadette Zurbriggen
295	23	8 March 1979	(United States) Aspen	GS _{094}	(West Germany) Christa Kinshofer	(West Germany) Irene Epple	(Switzerland) Marie-Theres Nadig
296	24	11 March 1979	(United States) Heavenly Valley	GS _{095}	(West Germany) Christa Kinshofer	(Liechtenstein) Hanni Wenzel	(West Germany) Irene Epple
297	25	18 March 1979	(Japan) Furano	SL _{106}	(France) Perrine Pelen	(Liechtenstein) Hanni Wenzel	(Austria) Annemarie Moser-Pröll
298	26	19 March 1979	(Japan) Furano	GS _{096}	(Switzerland) Marie-Theres Nadig	(Austria) Annemarie Moser-Pröll	(West Germany) Irene Epple

== Men ==
=== Overall ===
see complete table

In men's overall World Cup 1978/79 the best 3 results of each discipline count; best three downhills, best three giant slaloms, best three slaloms and best three combined. 37 racers had a point deduction. Ingemar Stenmark had 260 (!) points deduction and won 13 races.

Place	Name	Country	Total	DH	GS	SL	KB
1	Peter Lüscher	Switzerland	186	0	64	57	65
2	Leonhard Stock	Austria	163	57	50	17	39
3	Phil Mahre	United States	155	0	27	72	56
4	Piero Gros	Italy	152	0	58	57	37
5	Ingemar Stenmark	Sweden	150	0	75	75	0
6	Andreas Wenzel	Liechtenstein	148	0	59	34	55
7	Anton Steiner	Austria	107	10	33	36	28
8	Bojan Križaj	Yugoslavia	106	0	66	40	0
9	Gustav Thöni	Italy	92	0	26	54	12
10	Steve Mahre	United States	86	0	25	47	14
11	Leonardo David	Italy	85	0	25	60	0
12	Hans Enn	Austria	81	0	63	18	0
13	Jacques Lüthy	Switzerland	79	0	52	27	0
14	Christian Neureuther	West Germany	74	0	0	74	0
15	Peter Wirnsberger	Austria	72	70	0	2	0
	Peter Müller	Switzerland	72	69	2	0	1

=== Downhill ===
see complete table

In men's downhill World Cup 1978/79 the best 5 results count. Seven racers had a point deduction, which are given in brackets. Peter Müller won the cup with only one win. There were 8 different winners in 9 races. Leonardo David crashed in the race No. 29. He died after being in a coma for nearly six years.

Place	Name	Country	Total	2AUT	5ITA	6ITA	9FRA	12SUI	16AUT	20GER	23SUI	29USA
1	Peter Müller	Switzerland	109	-	20	20	(2)	20	-	(4)	25	24
2	Peter Wirnsberger	Austria	89	8	(2)	11	-	-	20	25	-	25
3	Toni Bürgler	Switzerland	80	-	11	-	-	25	2	-	22	20
4	Uli Spieß	Austria	75	-	-	4	15	-	15	20	(2)	21
	Ken Read	Canada	75	25	-	15	-	15	1	-	-	19
6	Leonhard Stock	Austria	67	-	-	-	-	6	4	11	24	22
7	Herbert Plank	Italy	65	11	(4)	-	20	-	8	15	-	11
8	Werner Grissmann	Austria	63	-	-	-	6	11	6	(6)	23	17
	Sepp Ferstl	West Germany	63	(1)	-	-	3	-	25	8	14	13
10	Dave Murray	Canada	52	20	-	3	-	2	-	-	4	23
	Steve Podborski	Canada	52	2	(1)	-	25	4	3	-	-	18
12	Erik Håker	Norway	41	-	-	25	-	-	-	-	-	16
13	Josef Walcher	Austria	40	-	25	-	-	-	-	-	15	-

=== Giant slalom ===
see complete table

In men's giant slalom World Cup 1978/79 the best 5 results count. Nine racers had a point deduction, which are given in brackets. Ingemar Stenmark won the cup with maximum points by winning ALL 10 events. He won his fourth Giant slalom World Cup.

Place	Name	Country	Total	1AUT	8YUG	10FRA	15SUI	19AUT	24TCH	27SWE	30USA	31USA	33JPN
1	Ingemar Stenmark	Sweden	125	25	25	25	25	25	(25)	(25)	(25)	(25)	(25)
2	Peter Lüscher	Switzerland	104	20	20	20	-	(20)	-	(2)	23	21	(19)
3	Bojan Križaj	Yugoslavia	96	-	15	15	(6)	-	20	-	22	24	(15)
4	Heini Hemmi	Switzerland	86	(2)	11	(8)	(11)	(11)	15	(8)	21	15	24
5	Jacques Lüthy	Switzerland	75	(1)	-	-	15	(1)	8	15	-	16	21
6	Andreas Wenzel	Liechtenstein	74	-	-	-	20	15	-	-	19	20	-
	Piero Gros	Italy	74	8	8	-	(4)	-	(1)	-	16	22	20
8	Jean-Luc Fournier	Switzerland	73	11	(2)	11	(8)	-	-	-	18	10	23
9	Hans Enn	Austria	70	-	-	-	-	3	-	4	24	23	16
10	Leonhard Stock	Austria	69	-	-	(3)	-	8	(2)	11	20	13	17

=== Slalom ===
see complete table

In men's slalom World Cup 1978/79 the best 5 results count. Six racers had a point deduction, which are given in brackets. Ingemar Stenmark won his fifth Slalom World Cup in a row.

Place	Name	Country	Total	4ITA	7YUG	11SUI	13SUI	17AUT	21GER	25TCH	26NOR	28SWE	32JPN
1	Ingemar Stenmark	Sweden	119	-	25	-	(15)	20	(11)	(15)	24	25	25
2	Phil Mahre	United States	107	-	-	(8)	(2)	15	20	25	23	24	-
3	Christian Neureuther	West Germany	97	15	-	25	8	25	-	-	-	-	24
4	Petar Popangelov	Bulgaria	96	(11)	-	20	-	-	15	(3)	19	20	22
5	Paul Frommelt	Liechtenstein	92	-	20	(3)	25	11	-	-	-	13	23
6	Peter Lüscher	Switzerland	72	20	-	-	(3)	-	25	4	-	11	12
7	Piero Gros	Italy	71	6	(4)	(6)	-	(3)	8	-	21	19	17
8	Leonardo David	Italy	70	4	15	-	-	6	-	20	25	-	-
9	Gustav Thöni	Italy	64	(3)	-	(1)	-	6	4	-	18	23	13
10	Martial Donnet	Switzerland	63	25	1	11	6	-	-	-	-	-	20

=== Combined ===
see complete table

There was no special discipline world cup for Combined awarded. The best three results only count for the Overall World Cup. However, Peter Lüscher's strong performance in this discipline was the critical factor in his victory in the Overall.

Place	Name	Country	Total	3AUT	14SUI	18AUT	22GER
1	Andreas Wenzel	Liechtenstein	70	15	20	20	15
2	Peter Lüscher	Switzerland	69	25	4	15	25
3	Phil Mahre	United States	60	11	25	4	20
4	Piero Gros	Italy	41	4	15	11	11
5	Leonhard Stock	Austria	39	20	11	-	8
6	Anton Steiner	Austria	28	-	3	25	-
7	Bohumír Zeman	Czechoslovakia	18	8	-	6	4
8	Steve Mahre	United States	14	-	8	-	6
	Herbert Plank	Italy	14	3	-	8	3
10	Gustav Thöni	Italy	12	6	6	-	-

== Women ==
=== Overall ===
see complete table

In women's overall World Cup 1978/79 the best 3 results of each discipline count; best three downhills, best three giant slaloms, best three slaloms and best three combined. 25 racers had a point deduction. Annemarie Moser-Pröll won her sixth Overall World Cup - this record is still unbeaten.

Place	Name	Country	Total	DH	GS	SL	KB
1	Annemarie Moser-Pröll	Austria	243	75	40	58	70
2	Hanni Wenzel	Liechtenstein	240	40	71	74	55
3	Irene Epple	West Germany	189	66	70	17	36
4	Cindy Nelson	United States	168	67	43	12	46
5	Marie-Theres Nadig	Switzerland	156	63	68	0	25
6	Fabienne Serrat	France	151	6	61	49	35
7	Regina Sackl	Austria	112	0	39	73	0
8	Christa Kinshofer	West Germany	110	0	75	35	0
9	Perrine Pelen	France	100	0	32	65	3
10	Claudia Giordani	Italy	98	3	23	55	17
11	Lea Sölkner	Austria	95	0	29	66	0
12	Regine Mösenlechner	West Germany	85	0	31	46	8
13	Maria Rosa Quario	Italy	84	0	19	65	0
14	Daniela Zini	Italy	82	0	28	54	0
15	Erika Hess	Switzerland	76	0	43	33	0

=== Downhill ===
see complete table

In women's downhill World Cup 1978/79 the best 5 results count. Five racers had a point deduction, which are given in brackets. Annemarie Moser-Pröll won 6 races out of 7 and five races in a row. She won the World Cup with maximum points. Together with the last two downhill races last season 1977/78, she won 7 downhill races in a row. She won her seventh Downhill World Cup - this record is still unbeaten.

Place	Name	Country	Total	1ITA	4FRA	9SUI	10SUI	14AUT	18GER	22USA
1	Annemarie Moser-Pröll	Austria	125	25	25	25	25	25	-	(25)
2	Bernadette Zurbriggen	Switzerland	90	-	15	-	15	19	18	23
3	Marie-Theres Nadig	Switzerland	89	(8)	11	15	(6)	22	17	24
4	Cindy Nelson	United States	82	(1)	-	11	4	24	25	18
5	Irene Epple	West Germany	81	(4)	(1)	8	20	23	23	7
6	Evi Mittermaier	West Germany	67	-	20	20	-	18	9	-
7	Edith Peter	Austria	64	8	6	(6)	8	21	-	21
8	Caroline Attia	France	55	2	3	-	11	-	24	15
9	Annemarie Bischofsberger	West Germany	49	-	-	-	-	9	20	20
10	Cornelia Pröll	Austria	41	-	-	-	-	-	19	22
	Hanni Wenzel	Liechtenstein	41	-	-	-	1	13	15	12
	Brigitte Totschnig	Austria	41	-	-	-	-	20	12	9

=== Giant slalom ===
see complete table

In women's giant slalom World Cup 1978/79 the best 5 results count. Four racers had a point deduction, which are given in brackets. Christa Kinshofer won five races in a row. She won the World Cup with maximum points.

Place	Name	Country	Total	3ITA	5FRA	7FRA	20GER	23USA	24USA	26JPN
1	Christa Kinshofer	West Germany	125	-	25	25	25	25	25	(14)
2	Hanni Wenzel	Liechtenstein	112	25	20	(20)	(6)	22	24	21
3	Irene Epple	West Germany	105	15	-	(1)	20	24	23	23
4	Marie-Theres Nadig	Switzerland	94	20	15	11	(4)	23	-	25
5	Fabienne Serrat	France	65	-	-	4	-	21	21	19
6	Heidi Preuss	United States	58	-	-	-	-	19	17	22
7	Cindy Nelson	United States	46	-	3	-	-	13	10	20
	Viki Fleckenstein	United States	46	-	-	-	-	14	14	18
9	Regina Sackl	Austria	45	-	6	15	11	-	13	-
10	Erika Hess	Switzerland	43	-	-	-	-	20	22	1

=== Slalom ===
see complete table

In women's slalom World Cup 1978/79 the best 5 results count. Six racers had a point deduction, which are given in brackets.

Place	Name	Country	Total	2ITA	8FRA	11SUI	13AUT	16AUT	17GER	21YUG	25JPN
1	Regina Sackl	Austria	105	(1)	25	25	-	(8)	23	22	10
2	Annemarie Moser-Pröll	Austria	87	(4)	15	-	15	20	14	-	23
3	Lea Sölkner	Austria	84	-	2	-	25	-	22	19	16
4	Perrine Pelen	France	82	20	20	2	-	15	-	-	25
5	Hanni Wenzel	Liechtenstein	81	-	(1)	-	4	3	25	25	24
	Claudia Giordani	Italy	81	15	(8)	20	20	(4)	13	-	13
7	Maria Rosa Quario	Italy	69	-	4	-	-	25	17	23	-
8	Fabienne Serrat	France	63	(2)	11	3	-	11	24	-	14
9	Daniela Zini	Italy	61	-	6	-	11	1	21	-	22
10	Christa Zechmeister	West Germany	51	6	-	(1)	6	-	8	11	20
11	Regine Mösenlechner	West Germany	50	-	-	4	8	-	-	21	17
12	Pamela Behr	West Germany	46	-	-	-	4	-	21	-	21
13	Abbi Fisher	United States	40	25	-	-	-	-	25	-	-

=== Combined ===
see complete table

There was no special discipline world cup for Combined awarded. The best three results only count for the Overall World Cup.

Place	Name	Country	Total	6FRA	12SUI	15AUT	19GER
1	Annemarie Moser-Pröll	Austria	70	20	25	25	-
	Hanni Wenzel	Liechtenstein	70	15	15	15	25
3	Cindy Nelson	United States	57	11	11	20	15
4	Irene Epple	West Germany	36	-	8	8	20
5	Fabienne Serrat	France	35	4	20	-	11
6	Marie-Theres Nadig	Switzerland	25	25	-	-	-
7	Claudia Giordani	Italy	17	-	6	11	-
8	Andrea Haaser	Austria	10	6	4	-	-
9	Regine Mösenlechner	West Germany	8	8	-	-	-
	Abbi Fisher	United States	8	-	-	-	8

== Nations Cup ==
=== Overall ===
Place	Country	Total	Men	Women
1	Austria	2095	1041	1054
2	Switzerland	1515	944	571
3	Italy	1119	711	408
4	United States	1009	369	640
5	West Germany	996	199	797
6	Liechtenstein	677	284	393
7	France	568	110	458
8	Sweden	505	505	0
9	Yugoslavia	297	285	12
10	Czechoslovakia	242	72	170
11	Canada	209	195	14
12	Bulgaria	115	115	0
13	Soviet Union	83	55	28
14	Norway	65	65	0
15	Japan	28	28	0
16	Belgium	3	0	3
	Spain	3	3	0
18	Poland	1	1	0

=== Men ===
Place	Country	Total	DH	GS	SL	KB	Racers	Wins
1	Austria	1041	435	277	262	67	18	4
2	Switzerland	944	320	375	179	70	15	6
3	Italy	711	162	187	295	67	16	1
4	Sweden	505	0	296	209	0	5	13
5	United States	369	33	82	178	76	11	2
6	Yugoslavia	285	0	206	79	0	4	0
7	Liechtenstein	284	0	81	133	70	3	1
8	West Germany	199	82	8	105	4	5	3
9	Canada	195	190	3	0	2	5	2
10	Bulgaria	115	0	5	110	0	1	0
11	France	110	18	83	9	0	4	0
12	Czechoslovakia	72	0	29	25	18	1	0
13	Norway	65	41	0	24	0	4	1
14	Soviet Union	55	36	8	9	2	5	0
15	Japan	28	0	3	25	0	5	0
16	Spain	3	0	0	0	3	1	0
17	Poland	1	0	0	0	1	1	0

=== Women ===
Place	Country	Total	DH	GS	SL	KB	Racers	Wins
1	Austria	1054	394	178	401	81	16	11
2	West Germany	797	240	306	202	49	10	5
3	United States	640	168	257	143	72	12	2
4	Switzerland	571	309	169	61	32	10	2
5	France	458	127	111	173	47	13	1
6	Italy	408	14	83	294	17	7	1
7	Liechtenstein	393	49	173	96	75	3	4
8	Czechoslovakia	170	38	76	50	6	4	0
9	Soviet Union	28	0	3	24	1	2	0
10	Canada	14	14	0	0	0	2	0
11	Yugoslavia	12	0	0	12	0	3	0
12	Belgium	3	3	0	0	0	1	0
