= Whistler Weasel Workers =

- Type: Non-profit society
- Purpose: Volunteer alpine ski race workers and organizers
- Location(s): Whistler, BC, Canada; Registered Office: Squamish BC, Canada
- Members: approx 400 local to BC, 200 outside BC.
- Website: www.weaselworkers.com

The Whistler Weasel Workers is a volunteer organization of alpine ski race workers that has been active in Whistler, British Columbia, Canada since the 1970s. The Whistler Weasel Workers is a non-profit society dedicated to the advancement of alpine ski racing in British Columbia and Canada. The Weasel Workers' major activity is the preparation and maintenance of ski race courses and the support and organization of ski racing competitions.

The Weasel Workers have participated in the 2010 Vancouver Winter Olympics, in all World Cup, Canadian Championship and NorAm alpine ski races that have been held in Whistler BC. The Weasel Workers have also participated in international ski races at other locations, including the FIS Alpine World Championships in Sierra Nevada, Spain (1996), and in Bormio, Italy (2005), in World Cup alpine ski races in Lake Louise, AB (2000–present), and in Beaver Creek, CO (2006), as well as in the Winter Olympic Games in Calgary, AB (1988) and in Salt Lake, UT (2002). The Whistler Weasel Workers participated in the 2008 Whistler World Cup and they played a role in the 2010 Vancouver Winter Olympic Games.

Alpine ski racing in Canada is largely dependent on volunteer workers who prepare a course for racing and then maintain the course during the event. This activity includes creating and maintaining a hard, smooth snow surface and installing and maintaining safety netting necessary to safeguard both the ski racers and spectators. Volunteers also organize and officiate most alpine ski races. Among officiating and other tasks requiring large numbers of volunteers are those of Gate Judging (confirms that competitors properly complete the course) and Course Security (restricts access to the race course).

In the 1970s, while watching a line of course workers walking, arm-in-arm, "boot-packing" the snow on a steep pitch on Whistler Mountain's Dave Murray track, an early race organizer was heard to say, "They're Weasel Workers", naming the group after the slope on which they were working. The name stuck and from that time, Whistler's volunteer ski race workers have been known as the "Weasel Workers".

A course crew setting B-Nets

In 1984, the organization formally registered itself as a society, under the name "Coast Alpine Event Club". This name is rarely used and the group is commonly known simply as "the Weasels". The Weasels are very loosely organized with membership requirements being simply four or five day's participation as a course worker at a Weasel-supported Whistler ski race. Most members are intermediate to advanced skiers, but the organization includes many non-skiers as well.

Whereas the core membership is resident in the Lower Mainland region of BC (Vancouver and surroundings), and in Whistler, Squamish and Pemberton, BC, Weasel Workers reside throughout Canada, as well as in the US, Australia, New Zealand, and many countries in Europe.

The Whistler Weasel Workers organization is sustained by camaraderie and a shared love of and dedication to alpine ski racing. The Weasels are supporters of the Canadian Alpine Ski Team. Many Weasels are or have been parents of ski racers competing at various levels. From local club and regional ski races to international World Cup races.
