= Pete Patterson =

American alpine skier (born 1957)

Personal information
- Born: January 4, 1957 (age 69)

Skiing career
- Sport: Alpine skiing
- Disciplines: Downhill, Combined, Giant slalom, Slalom

Olympics
- Teams: 2 – (1976, 1980)
- Medals: 0

World Championships
- Teams: 3 – (1976, 1978, 1980) (includes two Olympics)
- Medals: 1 (0 gold)

World Cup
- Seasons: 1976–1981
- Podiums: 0 – (4 top tens)
- Overall titles: 0 – (42nd in 1979)
- Discipline titles: 0 – (22nd in DH, 1981)
Medal record
Men's alpine skiing
Representing the United States
World Championships
Bronze medal – third place	1978 Garmisch	Combined

James Peter Patterson (born January 4, 1957) is a former World Cup alpine ski racer for the United States, from Sun Valley, Idaho. At the Winter Olympics, he finished thirteenth in the downhill in 1976 and fifth in 1980. At the time, he tied for the best finish by an American male in an Olympic downhill (with Bill Beck in 1952).

Two years earlier at the 1978 World Championships at Garmisch-Partenkirchen, West Germany, Patterson was the bronze medalist in the combined event. The combined was then a "paper race", using the results of the downhill, giant slalom, and slalom.

== World championship results ==
Year	Age	Slalom	Giant Slalom	Super-G	Downhill	Combined
1976	19	—	—	not run	13	—
1978	21	23	8	not run	25	3
1980	23	DNF1	DNF1	not run	5	—

From 1948 through 1980, the Winter Olympics were also the World Championships for alpine skiing.

== Olympic results ==
Year	Age	Slalom	Giant Slalom	Super-G	Downhill	Combined
1976	19	—	—	not run	13	not run
1980	23	DNF1	DNF1	not run	5	not run
