= Weirather =

Weirather is a German surname that may refer to

- Harti Weirather (born 1958), Austrian alpine skier
- Tina Weirather (born 1989), Liechtenstein alpine skier

== See also ==
- 18680 Weirather, a main-belt asteroid named after Sara Jo Weirather (born 1985)
