= Hong In-gi =

South Korean alpine skier (born 1961)

Personal information
- Nationality: South Korean
- Born: 22 April 1961 (age 65)

Sport
- Sport: Alpine skiing

Hong In-gi (born 22 April 1961) is a South Korean alpine skier. He competed in three events at the 1980 Winter Olympics.
