= Andy Mill =

American alpine skier

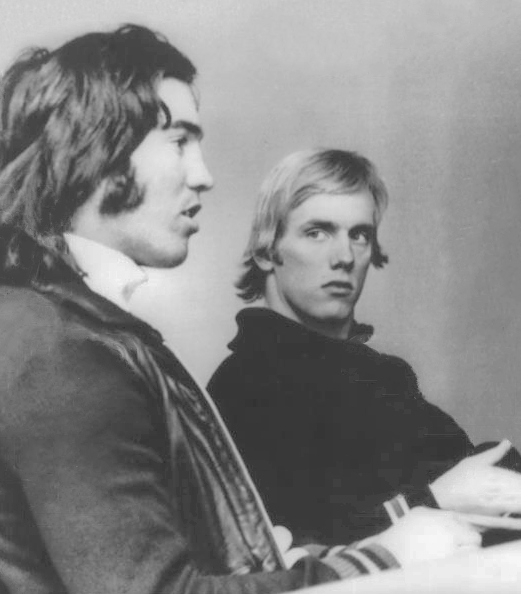
- Mill (left) in 1976

Personal information
- Born: Andy Ray Mill; February 11, 1953 (age 73) Fort Collins, Colorado, U.S.
- Height: 5 ft 11 in (180 cm)

Skiing career
- Sport: Alpine skiing
- Retired: January 1981 (age 27)
- Disciplines: Downhill, combined
- World Cup debut: 1974 (age 20)

Olympics
- Teams: 2 (1976, 1980)
- Medals: 0

World Championships
- Teams: 4 (1974, '76, '78, '80) (includes two Olympics)
- Medals: 0

World Cup
- Seasons: 8 (1974–1981)
- Wins: 0
- Podiums: 0 (7 top tens)
- Overall titles: 0 (37th in 1975)
- Discipline titles: 0 (9th in K, 1980)

Andy Ray Mill (born February 11, 1953) is a former alpine ski racer on the U.S. Ski Team. He was two-time Olympian, competing primarily in the downhill and combined events on the World Cup circuit.

== Ski career ==
Born in Fort Collins, Colorado, Mill moved with his family to Laramie, Wyoming, before relocating to Aspen, Colorado, in the early 1960s. Mill was an accomplished junior racer and made the U.S. Ski Team in 1971, and in 1974, Mill competed at the World Championships in St. Moritz, Switzerland. For the next seven years, when not injured, he was America's top downhill racer. In the mid-1970s, Mill was nicknamed "Wilder Hund" (wild dog) by Europeans for his gritty style and appearance (long hair & beard).

Mill's finest hour was at the 1976 Winter Olympics in Innsbruck, Austria, where he placed sixth in the downhill at Patscherkofel, which was won dramatically by Franz Klammer of Austria. Mill's finish was the best by an American in the men's downhill in 24 years, since Bill Beck's fifth place in 1952. Mill had placed fifth in the previous year's World Cup event on the same run, his best World Cup finish.

Following the Olympics, Mill won the downhill at the 1976 U.S. Alpine Championships. Two years later, he competed at the 1978 World Championships in Garmisch, West Germany, and the 1980 Olympics in Lake Placid, where he was 16th in the downhill. His racing career ended in January 1981 after a serious crash in a training run on the Lauberhorn in Wengen, Switzerland.

In 1988, Mill was presented with the U.S. Olympic Spirit Award in recognition for overcoming adversity in the 1976 Olympic Games, where he placed sixth in the downhill, even though injured. His lower right leg was so badly bruised from a training injury that he could not stand without pain the day before the race. In order to compete, he froze his leg in the snow minutes before entering the starting gate.

== World Cup results ==
=== Top ten finishes ===
- 0 podiums, 7 top tens (3 DH, 4 K)

Season	Date	Location	Discipline	Place
1975	5 Jan 1975	Garmisch, West Germany	Downhill	8th
1975	26 Jan 1975	Innsbruck, Austria	Downhill	5th
1976	25 Jan 1976	Kitzbühel, Austria	Combined	9th
1980	8 Dec 1979	Val d'Isère, France	Combined	10th
1980	16 Dec 1979	Madonna di Campiglio, Italy	Combined	10th
1980	12 Jan 1980	Lenggries, West Germany	Combined	9th
1981	15 Dec 1980	Val Gardena, Italy	Downhill	4th

== World championship results ==
Year	Age	Slalom	Giant slalom	Super-G	Downhill	Combined
1974	20	—	—	not run	28	—
1976	22	—	—	not run	6	—
1978	24	—	—	not run	22	—
1980	27	—	—	not run	16	—

From 1948 through 1980, the Winter Olympics were also the World Championships for alpine skiing.

== Olympic results ==
Year	Age	Slalom	Giant slalom	Super-G	Downhill	Combined
1976	22	—	—	not run	6	not run
1980	27	—	—	not run	16	not run

== After ski racing ==
Since his retirement from ski racing in 1981, Mill has worked as a ski racing commentator with ESPN, NBC, ABC, and CBS. He has a syndicated show in major ski areas in the U.S. entitled Ski with Andy Mill, which he hosts, writes and produces.

Mill has served on the boards of the Aspen Educational Foundation, the U.S. Olympic Educational Ski Foundation for the U.S. Ski Team, Aspen Winterclub Foundation, and National Atlantic Salmon Fishing Federation.

After his ski racing career concluded, Mill found another passion - tarpon fishing. A lifelong fisherman, he brought a similar level of dedication and perfection to fishing. Although he struggled for quite a few years, he eventually mastered the art of tarpon fishing and went on to become only the second angler to win five Gold Cup Tarpon tournaments and be a triple crown winner in tarpon fishing (Gold Cup, Hawley, and Golden Fly). Mill has also hosted an outdoor show on OLN, as well as fished for a number of fish including marlin, sailfish, bonefish, and permit.

== Personal life ==
Mill was divorced from his first wife, Robin, a former Miss California.

On July 30, 1988, in Boca Raton, Florida, Mill married tennis star Chris Evert, whom he had met 19 months earlier at a New Year's Eve party at the Hotel Jerome in Aspen. After 18 years of marriage and three sons, they were divorced in December 2006 in Fort Lauderdale, Florida, citing irreconcilable differences. Evert had left Mill for golfer and former friend of the couple, Greg Norman. Mill received $7 million in cash & securities from Evert, the $4 million house in Aspen, and several vehicles. After their divorce, Mill wished Evert and Greg Norman 'happiness'.

He became engaged to Debra Harvick of Aspen in 2009 and proposed marriage after their third date. Mill and Harvick married shortly before Evert and Norman separated after only 15 months of marriage. Mill is now divorced from Harvick.
