= Antony Guss =

Australian alpine skier (born 1959)

Personal information
- Nationality: Australian
- Born: 9 January 1959 (age 67) Melbourne, Australia

Sport
- Sport: Alpine skiing

Antony Guss (born 9 January 1959) is an Australian alpine skier. He competed in three events at the 1980 Winter Olympics.
