= Arnt Erik Dale =

Norwegian alpine skier (born 1960)

Personal information
- Born: 19 June 1960 (age 66) Oppdal Municipality, Norway

Sport
- Sport: Alpine skiing

Arnt Erik Dale (born 19 June 1960) is a Norwegian alpine skier. He was born in Oppdal Municipality, and represented the club Oppdal IL. He competed at the 1980 Winter Olympics in Lake Placid.
