= Philippe Pugnat =

French alpine skier (born 1959)

Philippe Pugnat (born 10 September 1959 in Sallanches) is a French retired alpine skier who competed in the men's downhill at the 1980 Winter Olympics, finishing 25th.
