= Josef Walcher =

Austrian alpine skier

Josef "Sepp" Walcher
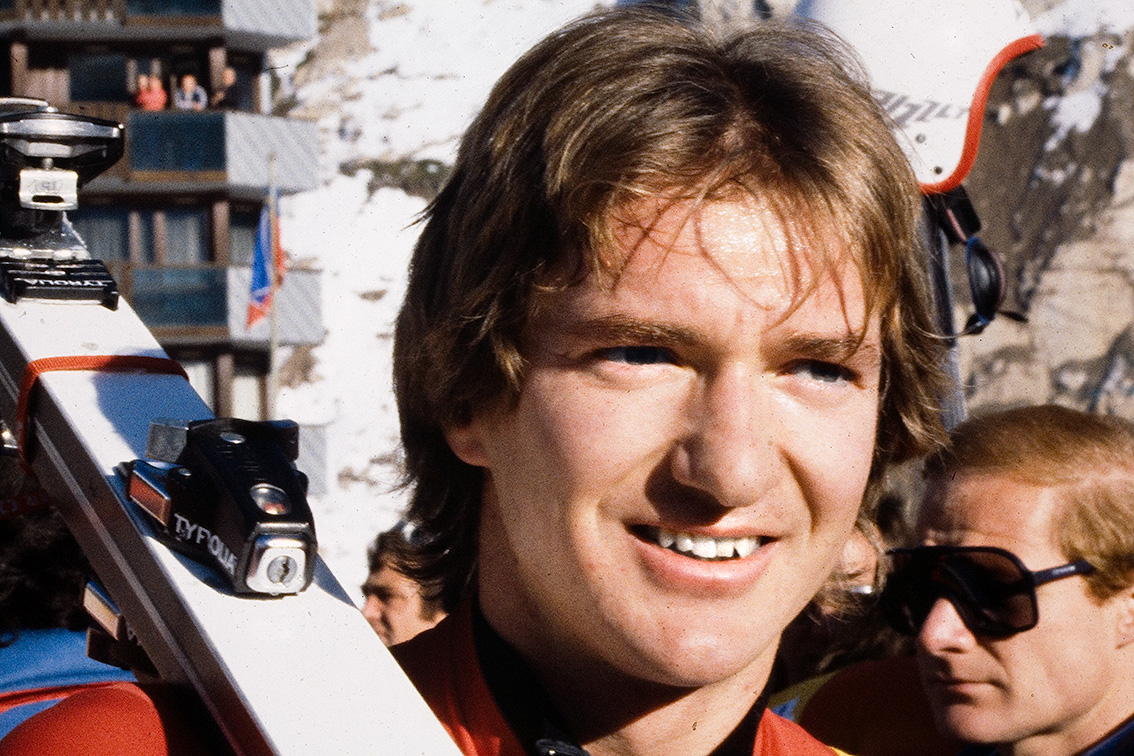
- Walcher in December 1977

Personal information
- Born: 8 December 1954 Schladming, Styria, Austria
- Died: 22 January 1984 (aged 29) Schladming, Styria, Austria
- Height: 178 cm (5 ft 10 in)

Skiing career
- Sport: Alpine skiing
- Retired: March 1982 (age 27)
- Disciplines: Downhill
- World Cup debut: December 1972 (age 18)

Olympics
- Teams: 2 – (1976, 1980)
- Medals: 0

World Championships
- Teams: 3 – (1976, 1978, 1980)
- Medals: 1 (1 gold)

World Cup
- Seasons: 10 – (1973–1982)
- Wins: 5 – (5 DH)
- Podiums: 13 – (13 DH)
- Overall titles: 0 – (7th in 1978)
- Discipline titles: 0 – (2nd DH: 1977, 1978)
Medal record
Men's alpine skiing
Representing Austria
World Cup race podiums: Event / 1st / 2nd / 3rd; Downhill / 5 / 4 / 4
World Championships
| Gold medal – first place | 1978 Garmisch | Downhill |

Josef "Sepp" Walcher (December 8, 1954 – January 22, 1984) was an Austrian World Cup alpine ski racer. He specialized in the downhill event and won the gold medal at the World Championships in 1978 at Garmisch, West Germany.

== Biography ==
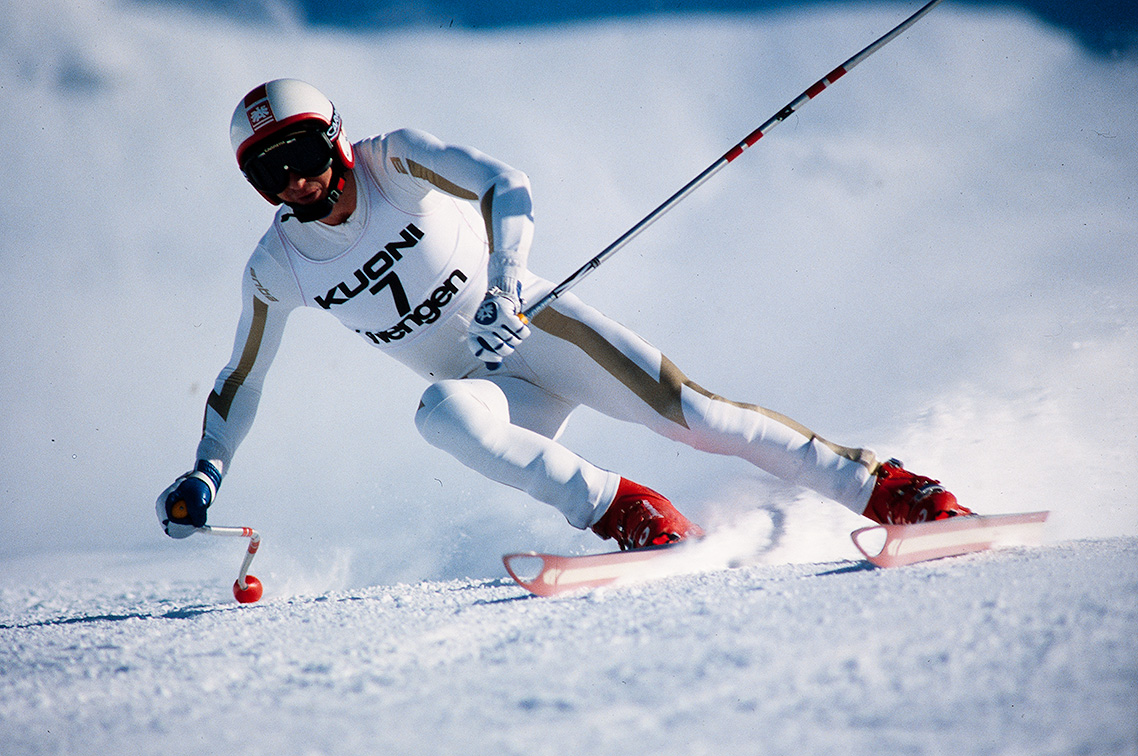
Sepp Walcher in action in 1978 Wengen downhill.

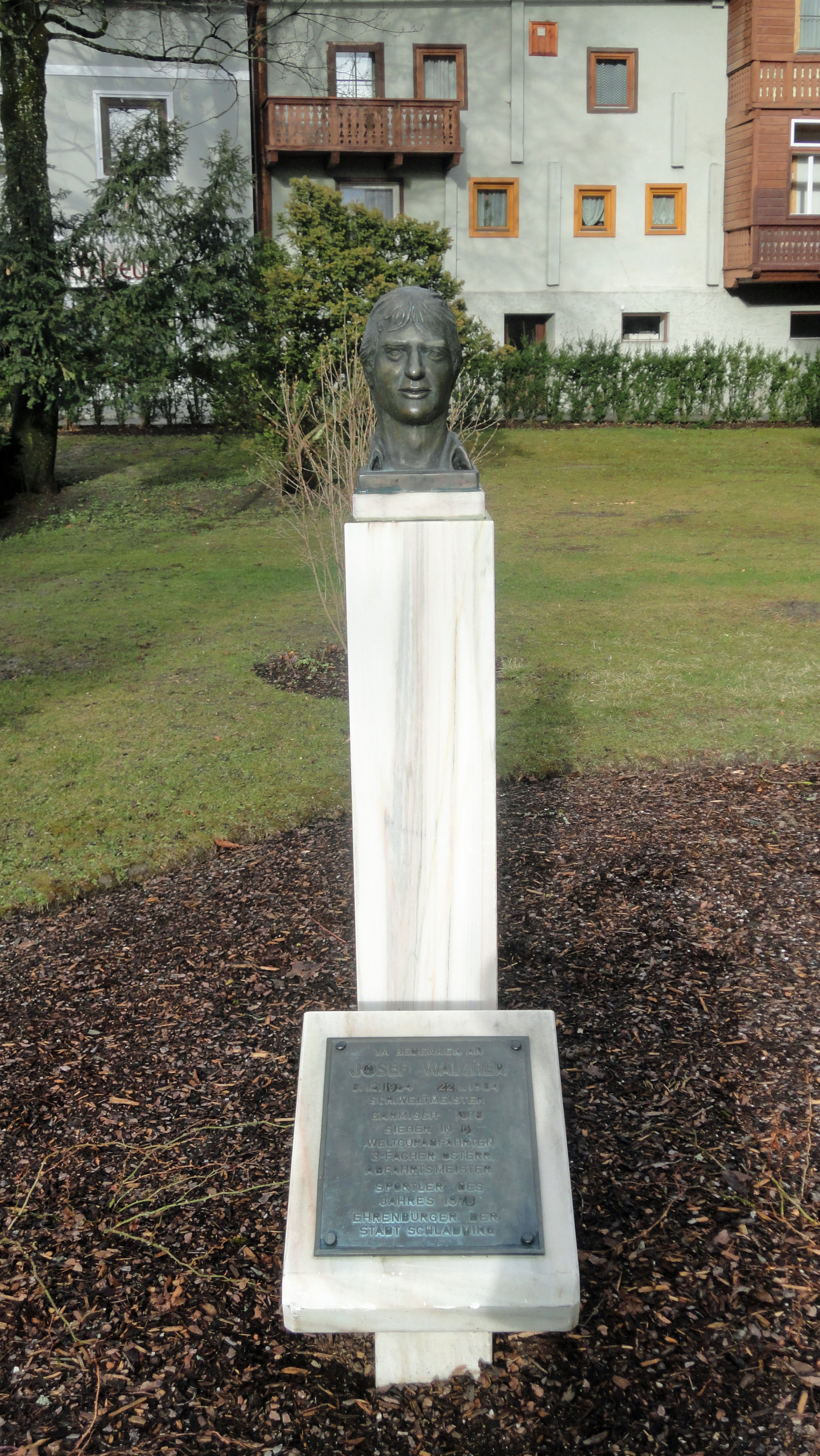
Walcher memorial in Schladming

Born in Schladming, Styria, Walcher made his World Cup debut in December 1972, two days after his 18th birthday. Two months later, he scored his first World Cup points (and podium) with a runner-up finish at St. Moritz, Switzerland. Walcher's first World Cup victory came in January 1977 at Morzine, France, his seventh podium. His best two seasons were 1977 and 1978, finishing runner-up to compatriot Franz Klammer in the downhill standings both years. A week prior to his win at the world championships in 1978, Walcher won consecutive downhills at Kitzbühel, Austria.

Walcher retired after the 1982 season with five World Cup victories and thirteen podium finishes. In 1984, he was killed at age 29 in a skiing accident at a benefit race in his hometown of Schladming. The race was a 8 km downhill where the skiers started only 30 seconds apart from each other. Walcher died after breaking his neck in a fall and hitting his head on a course marker.

== World Cup results ==
=== Season standings ===
| Season | Age | Overall | Slalom | Giant Slalom | Super G | Downhill | Combined |
|---|---|---|---|---|---|---|---|
| 1973 | 18 | 28 | — | — | not run | 11 | not awarded |
| 1974 | 19 | 29 | — | — | not run | 11 | not awarded |
| 1975 | 20 | 23 | — | — | not run | 12 | not awarded |
| 1976 | 21 | 30 | — | — | not run | 13 | — |
| 1977 | 22 | 8 | — | — | not run | 2 | not awarded |
| 1978 | 23 | 7 | — | — | not run | 2 | not awarded |
| 1979 | 24 | 39 | — | — | not run | 13 | not awarded |
| 1980 | 25 | 22 | — | — | not run | 7 | — |
| 1981 | 26 | 41 | — | — | not run | 14 | — |
| 1982 | 27 | 50 | — | — | not run | 18 | — |

=== Race podiums ===
- 5 wins – (5 DH)
- 13 podiums – (13 DH)

| Season | Date | Location | Discipline | Place |
|---|---|---|---|---|
| 1973 | 11 Feb 1973 | St. Moritz, Switzerland | Downhill | 2nd |
| 1974 | 18 Dec 1973 | Zell am See, Austria | Downhill | 3rd |
| 1975 | 5 Jan 1975 | Garmisch, West Germany | Downhill | 3rd |
| 1976 | 25 Jan 1976 | Kitzbühel, Austria | Downhill | 3rd |
| 1977 | 18 Dec 1976 | Val Gardena, Italy | Downhill | 2nd |
| 1977 | 30 Jan 1977 | Morzine, France | Downhill | 2nd |
| 1977 | 31 Jan 1977 | Morzine, France | Downhill | 1st |
| 1977 | 12 Mar 1977 | (United States) Heavenly Valley, USA | Downhill | 1st |
| 1978 | 11 Dec 1977 | Val d'Isère, France | Downhill | 3rd |
| 1978 | 20 Jan 1978 | Kitzbühel, Austria | Downhill | 1st |
| 1978 | 21 Jan 1978 | Kitzbühel, Austria | Downhill | 1st |
| 1979 | 16 Dec 1978 | Val Gardena, Italy | Downhill | 1st |
| 1980 | 18 Jan 1980 | Wengen, Switzerland | Downhill | 2nd |

== World championship results ==
| Year | Age | Slalom | Giant Slalom | Super-G | Downhill | Combined |
|---|---|---|---|---|---|---|
| 1976 | 21 | — | — | not run | 9 | — |
| 1978 | 23 | — | 27 | not run | 1 | — |
| 1980 | 25 | — | — | not run | — ^ | — |

From 1948 through 1980, the Winter Olympics were also the World Championships for alpine skiing.

== Olympic results ==
| Year | Age | Slalom | Giant Slalom | Super-G | Downhill | Combined |
|---|---|---|---|---|---|---|
| 1976 | 21 | — | — | not run | 9 | not run |
| 1980 | 25 | — | — | not run | — ^ | not run |

^ Walcher made the downhill team in 1980 but was dropped the day before the race, replaced by alternate Leonhard Stock, who won the gold medal.
