= Karl Anderson (alpine skier) =

American alpine skier (born 1953)

Karl Anderson (born August 6, 1953) is a former American alpine skier and sports executive who competed in the 1976 Winter Olympics and 1980 Winter Olympics.

== Early life ==
Born in Auburn, Maine, Anderson attended Johnson State College where he started skiing on the Can-Am circuit.

== Career ==
Karl represented United States on the World Cup circuit from 1974 to 1981, achieving four top 10 finishes, all in downhill. He won the US National title in downhill in both 1978 and 1979.

Following his skiing career, Anderson continued to contribute to the sport in various roles. He served as a member of the US Ski Association Board of Directors from 1982 to 1988 and was later an Assistant Executive Director and Chief Financial Officer of US Skiing. Additionally, he was on the Executive Board of the US Olympic Committee from 1984 to 1988 and was a member of the Athletes Advisory Council of the USOC.

Anderson was inducted into the Maine Ski Hall of Fame for his accomplishments and contributions to skiing.
