= Harti Weirather =

Austrian alpine ski racer

Personal information
- Born: 24 January 1958 (age 68) Reutte, Tyrol, Austria
- Height: 1.78 m (5 ft 10 in)

Skiing career
- Sport: Alpine skiing
- Club: SV Wängle
- Retired: January 1987 (age 29)
- Disciplines: Downhill, Super-G, Combined
- World Cup debut: December 1978 (age 20)

Olympics
- Teams: 1 – (1980)
- Medals: 0

World Championships
- Teams: 3 – (1980, 1982, 1985)
- Medals: 1 (1 gold)

World Cup
- Seasons: 8 – (1979–1986)
- Wins: 6 – (6 DH)
- Podiums: 17 – (17 DH)
- Overall titles: 0 – (8th in 1981)
- Discipline titles: 1 – (DH, 1981)
Medal record
Men's alpine skiing
Representing Austria
World Championships
Gold medal – first place	1982 Schladming	Downhill

Hartmann "Harti" Weirather (born 24 January 1958) is a former World Cup alpine ski racer from Austria. Born in Reutte, Tyrol, he specialized in the downhill event.

== Racing career ==
During the early 1980s, Weirather won six World Cup downhill races and won the downhill at the 1982 World Championships in Schladming, Austria. In addition, he won the World Cup season title in downhill in 1981.

Weirather's win at Kitzbühel in 1982 was the first-ever under two minutes on the full-length Streif course; his time (1:57.20) stood as the course record for ten years. (The two downhill races at Kitzbühel in 1982 were extremely fast compared to previous years; Weirather broke Franz Klammer's 1975 record (2:03.22) by over six seconds, and the top 15 finishers in both races were all under two minutes.)

== Personal ==
Weirather is married to former World Cup champion Hanni Wenzel of Liechtenstein. They run a business consultancy firm in Planken, Liechtenstein, and their daughter, Tina Weirather, is a former world junior champion and competes on the World Cup circuit for Liechtenstein.

== World Cup results ==
=== Season titles ===
Season	Discipline
1981	Downhill

=== Season standings ===
Season	Age	Overall	Slalom	Giant Slalom	Super G	Downhill	Combined
1979	21	53	—	—	not run	20	
1980	22	15	—	—	not run	4	—
1981	23	8	—	—	not run	1	—
1982	24	10	—	—	not run	3	—
1983	25	13	—	24	not awarded (w/ GS)	3	15
1984	26	27	—	—	not awarded (w/ GS)	11	—
1985	27	54	—	—	not awarded (w/ GS)	17	—
1986	28	83	—	—	—	33	—

=== Race podiums ===
- 6 wins - (6 DH)
- 17 podiums - (17 DH)

Season	Date	Location	Discipline	Place
1980	12 Jan 1980	Kitzbühel, Austria	Downhill	2nd
1980	4 Mar 1981	Lake Louise, Canada	Downhill	2nd
1981	14 Dec 1980	Val Gardena, Italy	Downhill	2nd
1981	15 Dec 1980	Val Gardena, Italy	Downhill	1st
1981	10 Jan 1981	(West Germany) Garmisch, W.Germany	Downhill	3rd
1981	24 Jan 1981	Wengen, Switzerland	Downhill	2nd
1981	31 Jan 1981	St. Anton, Austria	Downhill	1st
1981	5 Mar 1981	(United States) Aspen, USA	Downhill	2nd
1981	6 Mar 1981	(United States) Aspen, USA	Downhill	1st
1982	15 Jan 1982	Kitzbühel, Austria	Downhill	1st
1982	23 Jan 1982	Wengen, Switzerland	Downhill	1st
1982	13 Feb 1982	(West Germany) Garmisch, W.Germany	Downhill	3rd
1982	5 Mar 1982	(United States) Aspen, USA	Downhill	2nd
1983	5 Dec 1982	Pontresina, Switzerland	Downhill	1st
1983	5 Feb 1983	St. Anton, Austria	Downhill	3rd
1984	4 Dec 1983	Schladming, Austria	Downhill	2nd
1984	9 Dec 1983	Val d'Isère, France	Downhill	3rd

== World championship results ==
Year	Age	Slalom	Giant Slalom	Super-G	Downhill	Combined
1980	22	—	—	not run	9	—
1982	24	—	—	not run	1	—
1985	27	—	—	not run	17	—

From 1948 through 1980, the Winter Olympics were also the World Championships for alpine skiing.

== Olympic results ==
Year	Age	Slalom	Giant Slalom	Super-G	Downhill	Combined
1980	22	—	—	not run	9	not run
