= Erwin Josi =

Swiss alpine skier (born 1955)

Erwin Josi (born 1 March 1955 in Adelboden) is a Swiss retired alpine skier who competed in the men's downhill at the 1980 Winter Olympics, finishing 24th.
