= Vladimir Makeev =

Soviet alpine skier (born 1957)

Vladimir Ivanovich Makeev (Russian: Владимир Иванович Макеев; born 11 September 1957) is a former Soviet alpine skier who competed in the 1980 Winter Olympics and 1984 Winter Olympics. He was born in Kemerovo.
