= Dave Murray (skier) =

Canadian alpine ski racer (1953–1990)

David Murray

Personal information
- Born: 5 September 1953 Vancouver, British Columbia, Canada
- Died: October 23, 1990 (aged 37) Vancouver, British Columbia, Canada

Skiing career
- Sport: Alpine skiing ♂
- Disciplines: Downhill
- World Cup debut: 1975

Olympics
- Teams: 2

World Cup
- Podiums: 3

David Murray (September 5, 1953 – October 23, 1990) was an alpine ski racer. He was noted for being a member of the Crazy Canucks, the Canadian downhill racers of the late 1970s and early 1980s known for their fearless (and sometimes reckless) racing style. His teammates in the group were Ken Read, Dave Irwin, Steve Podborski, Todd Brooker and Jim Hunter.

== Biography ==
Murray took up ski racing relatively late, at the age of 15. As part of the Crazy Canucks, Murray was considered the team mediator. He earned three podium finishes including two second-place finishes behind fellow Crazy Canuck Ken Read. In 1979, he was ranked third in the world in downhill, but he never won a World Cup event. At the 1980 Winter Olympics in Lake Placid, he finished tenth in the downhill.

Murray retired from competitive skiing following the 1982 season. After retiring, he returned to British Columbia, becoming the director of skiing at Whistler Blackcomb and founding the Dave Murray Ski School in 1988. It has since become one of the most renowned ski schools in Canada, attracting visitors from across the nation. The downhill course at Whistler has been named the "Dave Murray Downhill." It hosted World Cup Downhill and Super-G races from 1993-95 and was used again at the 2010 Winter Olympics; it has been noted as being among the best in the world.

After a battle with skin cancer, Dave Murray died on October 23, 1990; he was 37 years old. Murray's daughter, Julia Murray, who was only 22 months old when he died, was a member of Canada's Ski Cross Team, and competed at the 2010 Olympics in Vancouver. His wife, Stephanie Sloan, was a pioneer in freestyle skiing and a world champion.

== See also ==
- Crazy Canucks
