= Urs Räber =

Swiss alpine skier (born 1958)

Personal information
- Born: 28 November 1958 (age 67) Grindelwald, Switzerland
- Height: 5 ft 7 in (171 cm)
- Website: http://www.hotel-schoenbuehl.ch/

Skiing career
- Sport: Alpine skiing
- Club: Skiclub Wilderswil/Grindelwald
- Retired: 1984
- Disciplines: Downhill and Combined
- World Cup debut: 1978

Olympics
- Teams: Switzerland
- Medals: 0 (0 gold)

World Championships
- Teams: Switzerland
- Medals: 0 (0 gold)

World Cup
- Seasons: 6
- Wins: 2
- Podiums: 6
- Overall titles: 0
- Discipline titles: 1 Downhill title (1984)

Urs Räber (born 28 November 1958) is a Swiss former alpine skier, who won the 1984 World Cup in Downhill skiing.

Räber also competed in two Olympic Downhill events. Firstly at the 1980 Winter Olympics in Lake Placid, where he finished 18th in the Olympic downhill, and then in the 1984 Winter Olympics in Sarajevo where he finished fifth in the Olympic downhill.

Räber now owns the Hotel Schönbuhl in Wilderswil near Interlaken in the Swiss canton of Bern.

== World Cup Downhill victories ==
Date	Location	Race
18 December 1983	Val Gardena, Italy	Downhill
7 January 1984	Laax, Switzerland	Downhill
