= Alpine skiing at the 1980 Winter Olympics =

Alpine skiing at the XIII Olympic Winter Games
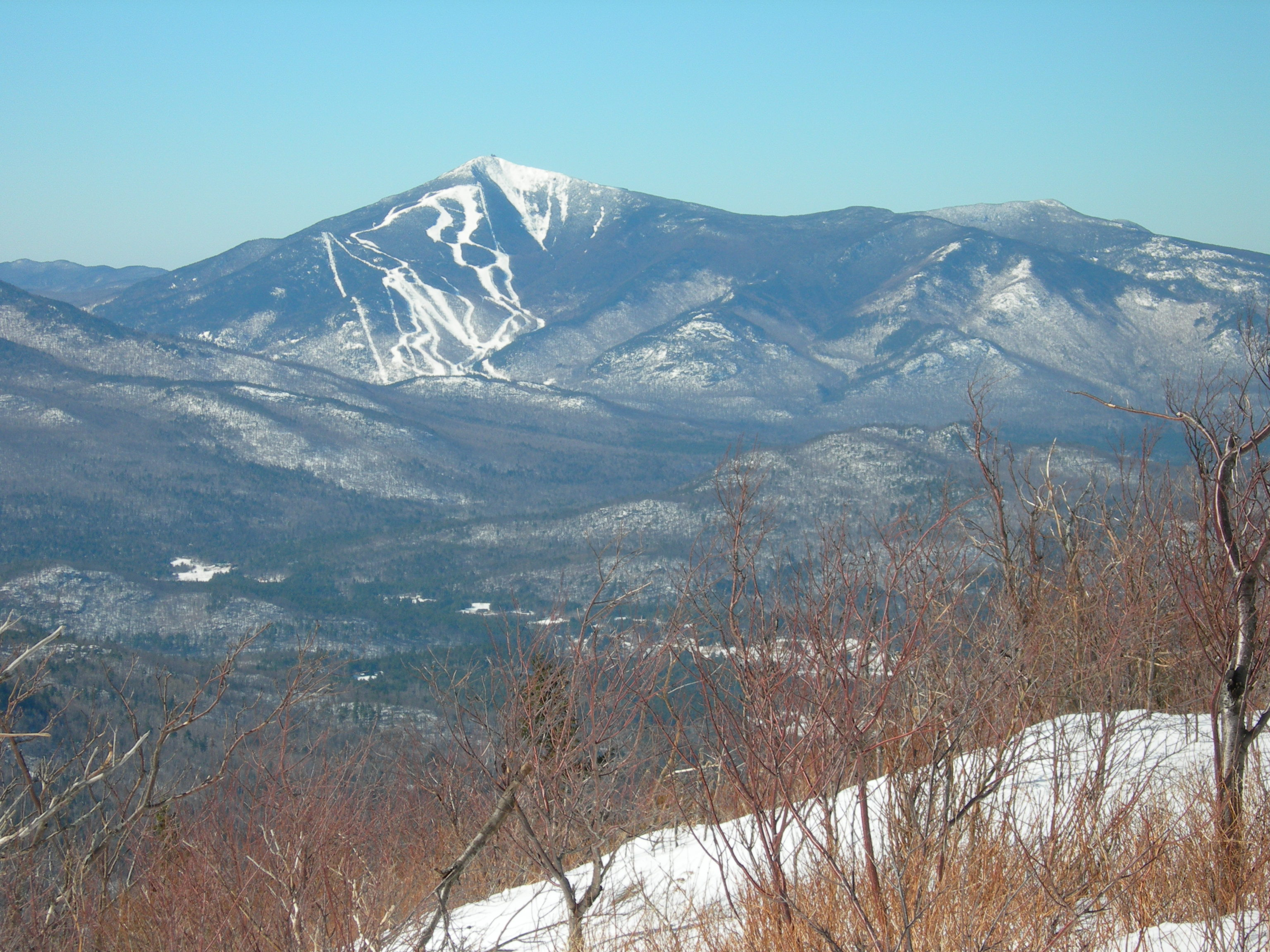
- Venue: Whiteface Mountain; Wilmington, New York
- Dates: February 14–23, 1980
- No. of events: 6
- Competitors: 174 from 30 nations

Alpine Skiing at the 1980 Winter Olympics consisted of six alpine skiing events. The races were held February 14–23 at Whiteface Mountain in Wilmington, New York, northeast of host Lake Placid.

This was the first Olympics in which the women's giant slalom consisted of two runs, rather than one, and both GS events ran only one run per day. This was the last Olympics which also served as World Championships for alpine skiing.

== Medal summary ==
Eight nations won medals in Alpine skiing, with Liechtenstein leading the medal table, winning two gold, and two silver. Hanni Wenzel led the individual medal table, finishing on the podium in all three women's events, with two gold and one silver. Ingemar Stenmark was the leading male medalist, with two golds.

Wenzel's two gold medals were the first, and to date, only, won by Liechtenstein at the Olympics.

=== Medal table ===
Rank	Nation	Gold	Silver	Bronze	Total
1	Liechtenstein	2	2	0	4
2	Austria	2	1	1	4
3	Sweden	2	0	0	2
4	West Germany	0	2	0	2
5	United States	0	1	0	1
6	Switzerland	0	0	3	3
7	Canada	0	0	1	1
7	France	0	0	1	1
Totals (8 entries)		6	6	6	18

=== Men's events ===
Event	Gold		Silver		Bronze	
Downhill	Leonhard Stock; Austria	1:45.50	Peter Wirnsberger; Austria	1:46.12	Steve Podborski; Canada	1:46.62
Giant slalom	Ingemar Stenmark; Sweden	2:40.74	Andreas Wenzel; Liechtenstein	2:41.49	Hans Enn; Austria	2:42.51
Slalom	Ingemar Stenmark; Sweden	1:44.26	Phil Mahre; United States	1:44.76	Jacques Lüthy; Switzerland	1:45.06

=== Women's events ===
Event	Gold		Silver		Bronze	
Downhill	Annemarie Moser-Pröll; Austria	1:37.52	Hanni Wenzel; Liechtenstein	1:38.22	Marie-Theres Nadig; Switzerland	1:38.36
Giant slalom	Hanni Wenzel; Liechtenstein	2:41.66	Irene Epple; West Germany	2:42.12	Perrine Pelen; France	2:42.41
Slalom	Hanni Wenzel; Liechtenstein	1:25.09	Christa Kinshofer; West Germany	1:26.50	Erika Hess; Switzerland	1:27.89

== Course information ==
Date	Race	Start Elevation	Finish Elevation	Vertical Drop	Course Length	Average Gradient
Thu 14-Feb	Downhill – men	1,313 m (4,308 ft)	481 m (1,578 ft)	832 m (2,730 ft)	3.009 km (1.870 mi)	27.7%
Sun 17-Feb	Downhill – women	1,181 m (3,875 ft)	481 m (1,578 ft)	700 m (2,297 ft)	2.698 km (1.676 mi)	25.9%
Mon 18-Feb	Giant slalom – men (1st run)	876 m (2,874 ft)	481 m (1,578 ft)	395 m (1,296 ft)	1.354 km (0.841 mi)	29.2%
Tue 19-Feb	Giant slalom – men (2nd run)	876 m (2,874 ft)	481 m (1,578 ft)	395 m (1,296 ft)	1.303 km (0.810 mi)	30.3%
Wed 20-Feb	Giant slalom – women (1st run)	845 m (2,772 ft)	481 m (1,578 ft)	364 m (1,194 ft)	1.231 km (0.765 mi)	29.6%
Thu 21-Feb	Giant slalom – women (2nd run)	876 m (2,874 ft)	512 m (1,680 ft)	364 m (1,194 ft)	1.315 km (0.817 mi)	27.7%
Fri 22-Feb	Slalom – men (2 runs)	876 m (2,874 ft)	667 m (2,188 ft)	209 m (686 ft)	0.549 km (0.341 mi)	38.1%
Sat 23-Feb	Slalom – women (2 runs)	845 m (2,772 ft)	667 m (2,188 ft)	178 m (584 ft)	0.465 km (0.289 mi)	38.3%

== Participating nations ==
Thirty nations sent alpine skiers to compete in the events in Lake Placid. China, Costa Rica and Cyprus made their Olympic alpine skiing debuts. Below is a list of the competing nations; in parentheses are the number of national competitors.

- Andorra (3)
- Argentina (6)
- Australia (4)
- Austria (12)
- Belgium (2)
- Bolivia (3)
- Bulgaria (4)
- Canada (7)
- China (2)
- Costa Rica (1)
- Cyprus (3)
- Czechoslovakia (2)
- France (7)
- West Germany (13)
- Great Britain (9)
- Greece (3)
- Iceland (3)
- Italy (14)
- Japan (4)
- South Korea (1)
- Lebanon (3)
- Liechtenstein (5)
- New Zealand (5)
- Norway (7)
- Soviet Union (5)
- Spain (5)
- Sweden (6)
- Switzerland (14)
- United States (13)
- Yugoslavia (8)

== World championships ==
From 1948 through these Olympics in 1980, the alpine skiing events at the Winter Olympics also served as the World Championships, held every two years. With the addition of the giant slalom, the combined event was dropped for 1950 and 1952, but returned as a World Championship event in 1954 as a "paper race" which used the results from the three events. During the Olympics from 1956 through 1980, World Championship medals were awarded by the FIS for the combined event. The combined returned as a separate event at the World Championships in 1982 and at the Olympics in 1988.

=== Combined ===
Men's Combined

Medal	Athlete	Points	DH	GS	SL
1st place, gold medalist(s)	(United States) Phil Mahre (USA)	45.53	14	10	2nd place, silver medalist(s)
2nd place, silver medalist(s)	(Liechtenstein) Andreas Wenzel (LIE)	60.15	20	2nd place, silver medalist(s)	12
3rd place, bronze medalist(s)	(Austria) Leonhard Stock (AUT)	76.33	1st place, gold medalist(s)	26	18
4	(Czechoslovakia) Bohumir Zeman (TCH)	81.57	13	19	14
5	(Spain) Francisco Fernández-Ochoa (ESP)	118.37	27	22	22
6	(Australia) Antony Guss (AUS)	259.15	26	41	32

- Downhill: 14 February, Giant slalom: 18–19 February, Slalom: 22 February

Women's Combined

Medal	Athlete	Points	DH	GS	SL
1st place, gold medalist(s)	(Liechtenstein) Hanni Wenzel (LIE)	5.57	2nd place, silver medalist(s)	1st place, gold medalist(s)	1st place, gold medalist(s)
2nd place, silver medalist(s)	(United States) Cindy Nelson (USA)	95.04	7	13	11
3rd place, bronze medalist(s)	(Austria) Ingrid Eberle (AUT)	102.40	6	14	13
4	(Canada) Kathy Kreiner (CAN)	119.46	5	9	15
5	(Liechtenstein) Petra Wenzel (LIE)	145.73	23	19	14
6	(United Kingdom) Valentina Iliffe (GBR)	254.96	25	31	16

- Downhill: 17 February, Giant slalom: 20–21 February, Slalom: 23 February

== See also ==
- Alpine skiing at the 1980 Winter Paralympics
