= Herbert Plank =

Italian alpine skier

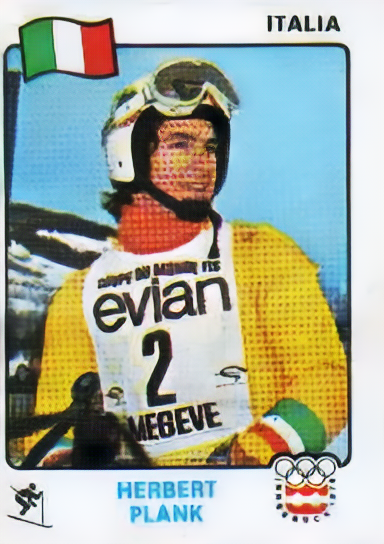

Personal information
- Born: 3 September 1954 (age 72) Sterzing, Italy

Skiing career
- Sport: Alpine skiing
- Retired: 1981

Olympics
- Medals: 1 (0 gold)

World Cup
- Wins: 5
- Podiums: 21
Medal record
Olympic Games
Bronze medal – third place	1976 Innsbruck	Downhill
World Cup race podiums
Event	1st	2nd	3rd
Downhill	5	9	6
Combined	0	1	0
Total	5	10	6

Herbert Plank (born 3 September 1954) is a former Italian alpine skier who competed in the 1976 Winter Olympics and in the 1980 Winter Olympics.

== Biography ==
In 1976 he won the bronze medal in the Alpine downhill event. That event also counted as a FIS Alpine World Championship. Four years later he finished sixth in the 1980 downhill competition.

Mr. Plank is the youngest winner of a male downhill race (Val d'Isère, 10 December 1973). He won five downhill races in the World Cup; in the downhill races he achieved second place nine times and third six times; he also became second in the Alpine Combined at St. Anton am Arlberg on 1 December 1981. In another 25 races (within 6 Combined) he finished in the Top Ten. He became second in the Downhill World Cup 1975/76 and third in the Downhill World Cup in the seasons 1973/74, 1974/75, 1977/78 and 1979/80. Because retiring after the season 1981/82, he didn't compete in Super-Gs. His son Andreas Plank (nickname Andy) is also an Alpine Skiing Racer; he became World Champion in the Downhill at the FIS Alpine Junior World Championships 2009.

== See also ==
- Italy national alpine ski team at the Olympics
- Italian skiers who closed in top 10 in overall World Cup
