= Toni Bürgler =

Swiss alpine skier (born 1957)

Toni Bürgler (born 17 August 1957 in Rickenbach, Schwyz) is a Swiss former alpine skier who competed in the 1980 Winter Olympics.
