= Walter Vesti =

Swiss alpine skier (born 1950)

Walter Vesti (born 6 March 1950) is a Swiss former alpine skier. During his career he only won a single FIS Alpine Ski World Cup event, in 1975 at Megève in France.
