= Ulrich Spiess =

Austrian alpine skier

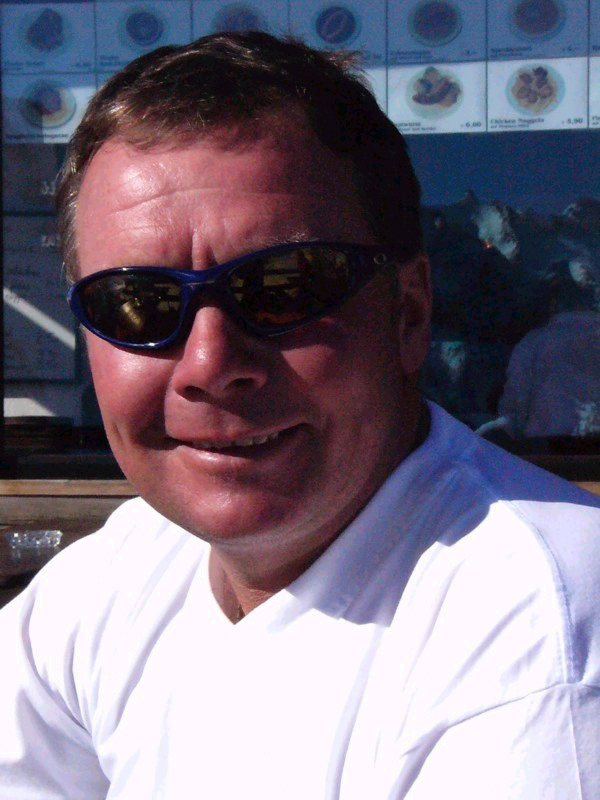

Personal information
- Born: 15 August 1955 (age 70) Innsbruck, Austria

Skiing career
- Sport: Alpine skiing
- Retired: 1983
- Disciplines: Speed events
- World Cup debut: 1976

World Cup
- Seasons: 8
- Wins: 2
- Podiums: 7
Medal record
Men's alpine skiing
Representing Austria
World Cup race podiums
| Event | 1st | 2nd | 3rd |
|---|---|---|---|
| Downhill | 2 | 2 | 3 |

Urlich "Uli" Spiess (born 15 August 1955) is an Austrian former alpine skier.

He is the brother of the former alpine skier Nicola Spiess and is the son of Ernst Spiess and Erika Mahringer.

== Career ==
During his career he has achieved 22 results among the top 10 (7 podiums) in the World Cup.

== World Cup results ==
Victories

| Date | Place | Discipline | Rank |
|---|---|---|---|
| 07-12-1980 | (France) Val d'Isere | Downhill | 1 |
| 10-03-1978 | (Switzerland) Laax | Downhill | 1 |
