= Werner Grissmann =

Austrian alpine skier (born 1952)

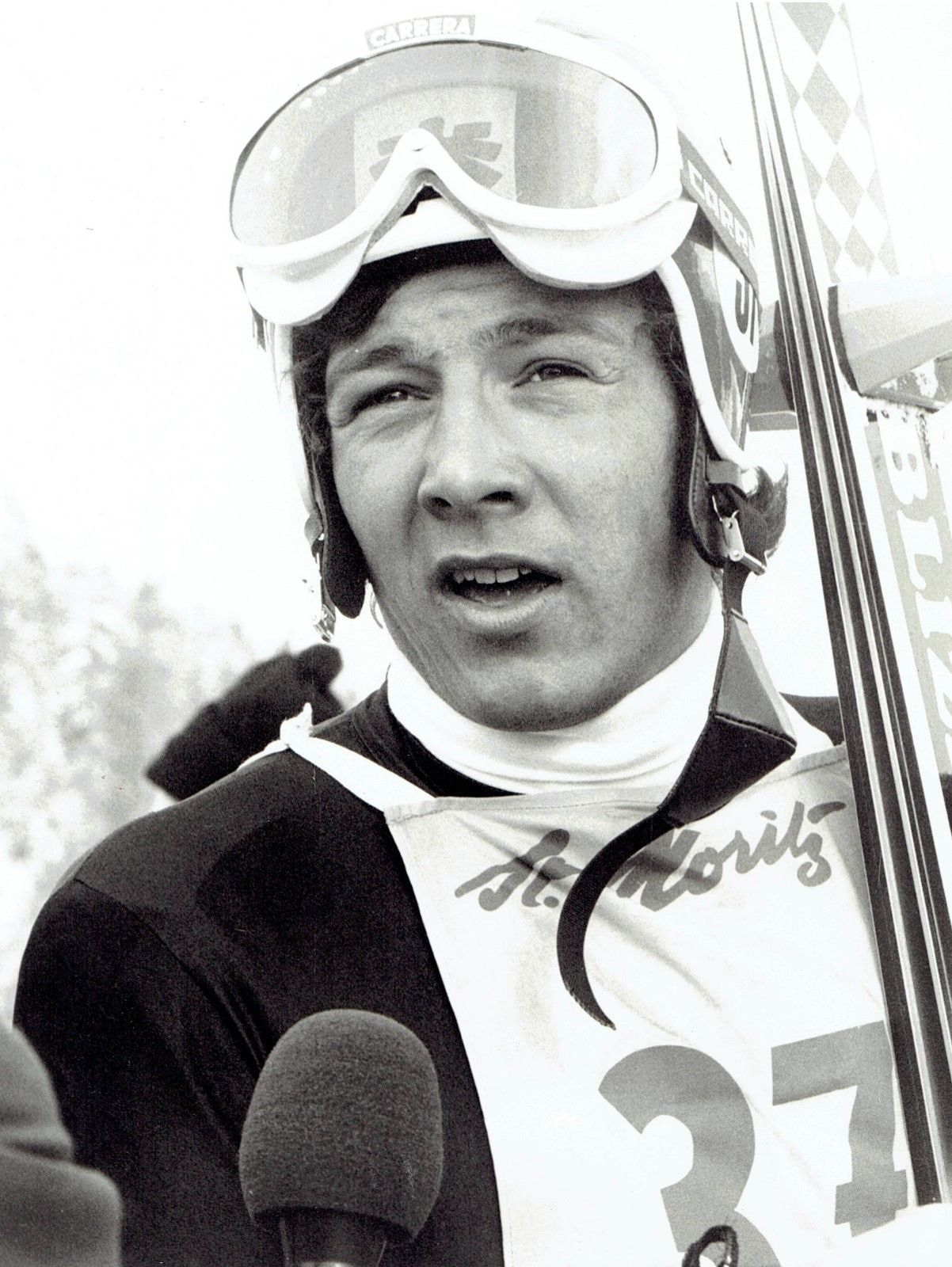
- Grissmann after winning a downhill race at the 1973 World Cup

Personal information
- Nationality: (Austria) Austrian
- Born: 21 January 1952 (age 74) Lienz, Austria
- Height: 183 cm (6 ft 0 in)
- Weight: 86 kg (190 lb)

Sport
- Sport: Alpine skiing
Medal record
Representing Austria
World Championships
Bronze medal – third place	1978 Garmisch-Partenkirchen	Downhill

Werner Grissmann
World Rally Championship record
- Years active: 1982–1986
- Co-driver: (Austria) Peter Vogel (Austria) Jörg Pattermann
- Rallies: 10
- Championships: 0
- Rally wins: 0
- Podiums: 0
- Stage wins: 0
- Total points: 12
- First rally: 1982 Acropolis Rally
- Last rally: 1986 Monte Carlo Rally

Werner Grissmann (born 21 January 1952) is an Austrian former alpine skier. He had his best achievements in the downhill event, winning a bronze medal at the 1978 World Championships and placing seventh at the 1980 Winter Olympics. He competed in the FIS Alpine Ski World Cup in 1972–1981 with the best result of eighth place in 1975.

== Complete WRC results ==
Year	Entrant	Car	1	2	3	4	5	6	7	8	9	10	11	12	13	WDC	Pts
1982	Werner Grissmann	Opel Ascona 400	MON	SWE	POR	KEN	FRA	GRC; Ret	NZL	BRA	FIN	ITA	CIV	GBR		NC	0
1983	Werner Grissmann	Audi 80 Quattro	MON	SWE	POR	KEN	FRA	GRC; Ret	NZL	ARG	FIN	ITA; Ret	CIV	GBR		NC	0
1984	Werner Grissmann	Audi 80 Quattro	MON	SWE	POR; Ret	KEN	FRA	GRC; Ret	NZL	ARG	FIN	ITA; 10	CIV	GBR		62nd	1
1985	Werner Grissmann	Audi Quattro A2	MON	SWE	POR; 5	KEN	FRA	GRC; Ret	NZL	ARG	FIN	ITA; 8	CIV	GBR		21st	11
1986	Werner Grissmann	Audi Quattro A2	MON; Ret	SWE	POR	KEN	FRA	GRE	NZL	ARG	FIN	CIV	ITA	GBR	USA	NC	0
