= Steve Podborski =

Canadian alpine skier (born 1957)

Steve Podborski OC
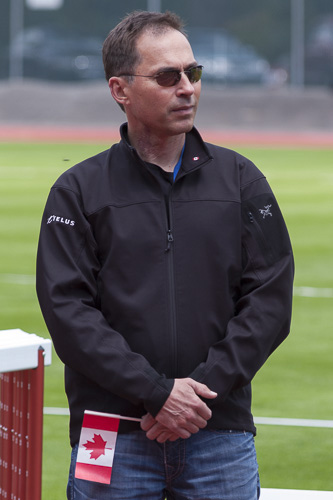
- Podborski in 2011

Personal information
- Born: Stephen Gregory Podborski; July 25, 1957 (age 68) Toronto, Ontario, Canada

Sport
- Country: Canada
- Sport: Alpine skiing
Medal record
Alpine Skiing
Representing Canada
Olympic Games
Bronze medal – third place	1980 Lake Placid	Downhill

Stephen Gregory Podborski OC (born July 25, 1957) is a Canadian former World Cup and Olympic downhill ski racer.

== Racing career ==
Born in Toronto, Ontario, Podborski started skiing at the age of two and a half at Craigleith Ski Club in Craigleith, Ontario. He joined the Canadian alpine ski team in 1973 and made his World Cup debut in 1974 at age 17, scoring two top ten finishes in his first World Cup season. He was due to make his Olympic debut at the 1976 Winter Olympics in Innsbruck, however he ruptured two knee ligaments in an accident just before the Games. He was a member of the Crazy Canucks, and won the bronze medal in the downhill at the 1980 Winter Olympics in Lake Placid.

In 1982, Podborski became the first North American to win the World Cup season title in downhill ski racing. In total, he won eight World Cup downhill races, including the notorious Hahnenkamm in Kitzbühel, Austria, which he won twice (1981–82). In 34 more races, he finished in the top 10. He retired following the 1984 season at age 26. Podborski was on the podium in World Cup races 20 times in approximately 100 races with 8 victories.

Erik Guay is the only other male Canadian ski racer to win a World Cup season title (Super-G, 2011) (Nancy Greene won two overall World Cup crystal globes as well as two discipline titles in giant slalom) with 5 World Cup career wins, 1 in Downhill. Ken Read came close to winning the World Cup Downhill title (downhill, 1980) finishing second.

Podborski's racing career and successes led to many accolades, including being honoured with the Queen's Golden Jubilee Medal in 2002 and the Queen's Diamond Jubilee Medal in 2012.

== World championship results ==
Year	Age	Slalom	Giant Slalom	Super-G	Downhill	Combined
1978	20	DNF2	33	not run	7	—
1980	22	—	—	not run	3	—
1982	24	—	—	not run	9	—

From 1948 through 1980, the Winter Olympics were also the World Championships for alpine skiing.

== Olympic results ==
Year	Age	Slalom	Giant Slalom	Super-G	Downhill	Combined
1980	22	—	—	not run	3	not run
1984	26	—	—	not run	8	not run

== National and Provincial honours ==
In 1982, Podborski was made an Officer of the Order of Canada.

Podborski was inducted to the Canadian Olympic Hall of Fame in 1985, Canadian Ski Hall of Fame in 1986 and Canadian Sport Hall of Fame in 1987.

In 2006, Podborski was inducted into the Ontario Sport Hall of Fame and his former team the Crazy Canucks were honoured on Canada's Walk of Fame.

== After racing ==
Podborski participated in Prince Edward's charity television special The Grand Knockout Tournament in 1987.

He was on the bid committee for the 2010 Winter Olympics in Vancouver, responsible for international relations; he also worked as a sports newscaster in Salt Lake City. He worked as a commentator for American television for three Winter Olympics (2002–2010). He covered freestyle skiing for NBC in 2006 and 2002, and snowboarding for Olympics on CBS in 1998. Podborski also covered the Olympic Games in Athens for NBC doing play by Play with Paul Sherwen for Cycling as well as play by play for Tae Kwon Do.

Podborski's endeavours also include senior leadership roles in the corporate and non-profit sectors. In 2003, Podborski joined the Telus telecommunications firm, leading to a position of National Director, Community Sports and remained with the organisation until June 2017.

Podborski was named the Chef de Mission for the Canadian Olympic Team for the Winter Olympic Games in Sochi in 2014.

In June 2017, Podborski became President and CEO of Parachute, a Canadian charitable organisation which focuses on injury prevention. Podborski describes his move into the injury prevention field as a natural extension of his athletic training: "I was the guy who wanted to win, and you can't win when you fall and get hurt. I was an early, dedicated fan of preventing injury." Podborski retired as CEO in May 2019 but continues to serve on Parachute's Board of Directors.

== See also ==
- Crazy Canucks
