= Leonhard Stock =

Austrian alpine skier

Personal information
- Born: 14 March 1958 (age 68) Zell am Ziller or Finkenberg, Tyrol, Austria
- Height: 1.83 m (6 ft 0 in)

Skiing career
- Sport: Alpine skiing
- Club: WSV Zell am Ziller
- Retired: 1993
- Disciplines: Speed events
- World Cup debut: 1977

Olympics
- Teams: 4
- Medals: 1

World Championships
- Teams: 7
- Medals: 2

World Cup
- Seasons: 17
- Wins: 3
- Podiums: 25
Medal record
Men's alpine skiing
Representing Austria
World Cup race podiums
Event	1st	2nd	3rd
Downhill	3	5	4
Super-G	0	1	5
Combined	0	4	3
Total	3	10	12
International competitions
Event	1st	2nd	3rd
Olympic Games	1	0	0
World Championships	1	0	1
Junior World Championships	2	2	0
Total	4	2	1
Olympic Games
Gold medal – first place	1980 Lake Placid	Downhill
World Championships
Bronze medal – third place	1980 Lake Placid	Combined

Leonhard Stock (born 14 March 1958) is a former World Cup alpine ski racer from Austria.

== Career ==
Stock earned his first World Cup points at age 18 in January 1977. At the 1980 Winter Olympics in Lake Placid, Stock was originally an alternate for the downhill, but his fast training times on the course at Whiteface Mountain earned him a spot on the four-man Austrian team. On race day, he was the ninth racer on the course and posted the fastest time to win the gold medal.

Stock could not repeat his surprise win at the Lake Placid Olympics on the World Cup tour until almost a decade later, winning downhill races in 1989, 1990, and 1992. At the 1988 Winter Olympics in Calgary, he just missed a second Olympic medal, finishing fourth in the downhill and eighth in the Super-G at Nakiska.

In 1997 he took over his parental (farm)house in Finkenberg and converted it into a hotel. With his brother Hans he also runs a sports and fashion store in that town.

== World Cup victories ==
- 3 wins (3 DH), 27 podiums

Season	Date	Location	Discipline
1989	6 Jan 1989	Laax, Switzerland	Downhill
1991	8 Dec 1990	Val d'Isère, France	Downhill
1993	12 Dec 1992	Val Gardena, Italy	Downhill

== World championship results ==
Year	Age	Slalom	Giant Slalom	Super-G	Downhill	Combined
1978	19	—	27	not run	—	—
1980	21	18	26	not run	1	3
1982	23	—	—	not run	15	—
1985	26	—	—	not run	—	—
1987	28	—	—	4	8	8
1989	30	—	—	9	22	—
1991	32	—	—	—	4	—

From 1948 through 1980, the Winter Olympics were also the World Championships for alpine skiing.

== Olympic results ==
Year	Age	Slalom	Giant Slalom	Super-G	Downhill	Combined
1980	21	18	26	not run	1	not run
1984	25	—	—	not run	—	not run
1988	29	—	—	8	4	—
1992	33	—	—	—	DNF	—
