= List of FIS Alpine Ski World Cup men's race winners =

Statistics on the Alpine Ski World Cup

List of men's World Cup winners
Information
Sport:	Alpine skiing
Competition:	FIS World Cup
First winner:	(Austria) Heinrich Messner
Last winner:	(Italy) Giovanni Franzoni
Most wins
All:	(Sweden) Ingemar Stenmark (86)
Downhill:	(Austria) Franz Klammer (25)
Super-G:	(Austria) Hermann Maier (24)
Giant slalom:	(Sweden) Ingemar Stenmark (46)
Slalom:	(Sweden) Ingemar Stenmark (40)
Total
Winners:	320
Events:	2002

This is a list of all male winners in FIS Alpine Ski World Cup from 1967 to present.

The list includes all downhill, super-G, giant slalom, slalom, combined, parallel slalom and parallel giant slalom, but does not show team events.

== History ==
In 58 World Cup seasons 2002 races (549 downhills, 260 super-Gs, 476 giant slaloms, 562 slaloms, 134 combined, two parallel slaloms, ten city events, eight parallel giant slaloms and one K.O. slalom) for men were held. These events saw 2014 winners, because twelve races (five downhills, four super-Gs, one giant slalom, and two slaloms) ended with a tie.

A total of 320 male alpine skiers from 23 nations have won at least one individual race. The first winner in 1967 was the Austrian Heinrich Messner who won the slalom in Berchtesgaden. The newest member in this list is Italian Giovanni Franzoni who won the super-G in Wengen, Switzerland on 16 January 2026. Alpine skiers from twenty nations from three continents have won races; Yugoslavia and Slovenia are listed separately, but counted as one nation; also Germany and West Germany are shown but counted together. The first winner for his country is highlighted in plum.

Jean-Claude Killy was the first skier to win races in two seasons (1967 and 1967/1968), while Ingemar Stenmark won races in 13 seasons and set a record for the greatest absolute number of races won in a single season, winning 13 races (out of 33 total) in the 1978–79 season. He won races between 1974/1975 and 1988/1989, only failing to win in the seasons 1984/1985 and 1987/1988. Marc Girardelli, Benjamin Raich, and Aksel Lund Svindal all won races in twelve seasons. Stenmark was also able to win races in ten consecutive seasons (1974/1975 to 1983/1984). Alberto Tomba bettered this mark, when he won races in eleven consecutive seasons (1987/1988 to 1997/1998), and he is still the only skier to do so. Marcel Hirscher (2009/2010 to 2018/2019), Alexis Pinturault (2011/2012 to 2020/2021), Dominik Paris (2012/2013 to 2021/2022), and Henrik Kristoffersen (2013/2014 to 2022/2023) won races in ten consecutive seasons. Pirmin Zurbriggen (1981/1982 to 1989/1990), Michael Walchhofer (2002/2003 to 2010/2011), Aksel Lund Svindal (2005/2006 to 2013/2014), and Ted Ligety (2007/2008 to 2015/2016) all won races in nine consecutive seasons.

Patrick Russel was the first to win races in three and four seasons, Henri Duvillard was the first to win races in five seasons. Gustav Thöni was the first to win races in six, seven, and eight seasons. Ingemar Stenmark was the first to win races in nine, ten, eleven, and twelve seasons and he is the only skier to win races in 13 seasons.

Jean-Claude Killy won all his 18 races in only two seasons, achieving the unmatched feat of winning 12/17, or ~71% of races in a single season (1967), while Günther Mader won his 14 races in nine seasons. Paul Accola was only able to win races in one season (1991/1992), but won seven events in four disciplines. Rok Petrovič also won races only in one season (1985/1986) when he won five slaloms. Michael von Grünigen is the highest placed racer to win in only one discipline – 23 giant slaloms.

114 racers have won only one race. The downhill races saw 127 different winners (the 100th different winner was Canada's Manuel Osborne-Paradis in 2009), the super-G races saw 93 different winners, the giant slaloms 106 different (the 100th different winner was Norway's Lucas Braathen in 2020), the slaloms 122 different (the 100th different winner was Italy's Cristian Deville in 2012), combined events 40 different winners, parallel slalom events saw ten different winners and parallel giant slalom events saw seven different winners.

The youngest male winner is Piero Gros (born 30 October 1954) who won the giant slalom in Val-d'Isère on 8 December 1972 at the age of 18 years and 39 days. The oldest winner is Didier Cuche (born 16 August 1974) who was aged 37 years and 192 days when he won the super-G in Crans-Montana on 24 February 2012. The oldest skier to win his first race was Dave Ryding (born 5 December 1986) when he won the slalom in Kitzbühel on 22 January 2022, he was aged 35 years and 48 days.

The highest bib number with 66 to win a race was worn by Markus Foser in the downhill of Val Gardena on 17 December 1993. Only five days later the highest bib number to win a super-G was 51 used by Hannes Trinkl in Lech am Arlberg on 22 December 1993. In giant slalom the highest bib number 45 to win belonged to the youngest winner ever Piero Gros on 8 December 1972 in Val-d'Isère. The record holder for the highest bib number in slalom is Ivica Kostelić, who won in Aspen, Colorado with 64. Niels Hintermann won the Alpine combined in Wengen on 17 January 2017 with bib number 51. The third highest bib number overall to win a race was 61 worn by Josef Strobl on 16 December 1994 in the downhill in Val-d'Isère.

Disciplines were introduced in World Cup: downhill, giant slalom and slalom in 1967; Combined and parallel slalom in 1975; super-G in 1982, super-combined in 2006 and renamed to alpine combined in 2015. Five skiers have won races in all five main disciplines: Marc Girardelli, Pirmin Zurbriggen, Bode Miller, Kjetil André Aamodt and Günther Mader. An additional two skiers, Frenchmen Jean-Claude Killy and Henri Duvillard, have won races in all three disciplines contested during their careers (super-G was first introduced as a part of the giant slalom discipline in 1983 and was only established as a separate discipline in 1986, well after the 1968 and 1973 retirements of Killy and Duvillard, respectively).

(Sweden) Ingemar Stenmark	(Austria) Marcel Hirscher	(Austria) Hermann Maier	(Switzerland) Marco Odermatt
86 wins	67 wins	54 wins	54 wins

(Italy) Alberto Tomba	(Luxembourg) Marc Girardelli	(Switzerland) Pirmin Zurbriggen	(Austria) Benjamin Raich
50 wins	46 wins	40 wins	36 wins

(Norway) Aksel Lund Svindal	(France) Alexis Pinturault	(Norway) Henrik Kristoffersen	(United States) Bode Miller
36 wins	34 wins	34 wins	33 wins

== Winners ==
Active skier
The first racer to win for his country

#	Name	Country	Seasons	Wins	DH	SG	GS	SL	KB	PSL	PGS	CE	K.O.
1	Ingemar Stenmark	Sweden	13 (1975–1989)	86	–	–	46	40	–	–	NA	NA	NA
2	Marcel Hirscher	Austria	10 (2010–2019)	67	–	1	31	32	–	–	1	2	NA
3	Hermann Maier	Austria	10 (1997–2009)	54	15	24	14	–	1	–	NA	NA	–
	Marco Odermatt	Switzerland	7 (2020–2026)	54	8	17	29	–	–	–	–	–	NA
5	Alberto Tomba	Italy	11 (1988–1998)	50	–	–	15	35	–	–	NA	NA	NA
6	Marc Girardelli	Luxembourg	12 (1983–1996)	46	3	9	7	16	11	–	NA	NA	NA
7	Pirmin Zurbriggen	Switzerland	9 (1982–1990)	40	10	10	7	2	11	–	NA	NA	NA
8	Benjamin Raich	Austria	12 (1999–2012)	36	–	1	14	14	7	–	NA	–	–
	Aksel Lund Svindal	Norway	12 (2006–2019)	36	14	17	4	–	1	–	–	–	–
10	Alexis Pinturault	France	10 (2012–2021)	34	–	1	18	3	10	–	1	1	NA
	Henrik Kristoffersen	Norway	11 (2014–2025)	34	–	–	8	26	–	–	–	–	NA
12	Bode Miller	United States	9 (2002–2012)	33	8	5	9	5	6	–	–	–	–
13	Stephan Eberharter	Austria	6 (1998–2004)	29	18	6	5	–	–	–	NA	NA	–
14	Phil Mahre	United States	7 (1977–1983)	27	–	–	7	9	11	–	NA	NA	NA
15	Franz Klammer	Austria	8 (1974–1984)	26	25	–	–	–	1	–	NA	NA	NA
	Ivica Kostelić	Croatia	9 (2002–2013)	26	–	1	–	14	9	–	–	1	1
	Dominik Paris	Italy	13 (2013–2026)	26	20	6	–	–	–	–	–	–	NA
18	Ted Ligety	United States	10 (2006–2016)	25	–	–	24	–	1	–	–	–	NA
19	Gustav Thöni	Italy	8 (1970–1977)	24	–	NA	11	8	4	1	NA	NA	NA
	Peter Müller	Switzerland	10 (1979–1989)	24	19	2	–	–	3	–	NA	NA	NA
21	Michael von Grünigen	Switzerland	9 (1993–2003)	23	–	–	23	–	–	–	NA	NA	–
	Kjetil Jansrud	Norway	8 (2012–2020)	23	8	13	–	–	1	–	1	–	NA
23	Kjetil André Aamodt	Norway	10 (1992–2003)	21	1	5	6	1	8	–	NA	NA	–
	Didier Cuche	Switzerland	10 (1998–2012)	21	12	6	3	–	–	–	NA	–	–
	Aleksander Aamodt Kilde	Norway	6 (2016–2023)	21	12	9	–	–	–	–	–	–	NA
26	Vincent Kriechmayr	Austria	8 (2018–2026)	20	10	10	–	–	–	–	–	–	NA
27	Michael Walchhofer	Austria	9 (2003–2011)	19	14	3	–	–	2	–	NA	–	–
28	Jean-Claude Killy	France	2 (1967–1968)	18	6	NA	7	5	NA	–	NA	NA	NA
	Lasse Kjus	Norway	7 (1994–2005)	18	10	2	2	–	4	–	NA	NA	–
30	Franz Heinzer	Switzerland	8 (1983–1993)	17	15	–	–	–	2	–	NA	NA	NA
31	Beat Feuz	Switzerland	8 (2011–2022)	16	13	3	–	–	–	–	–	–	NA
32	Jean-Noël Augert	France	5 (1969–1973)	15	–	NA	2	13	NA	NA	NA	NA	NA
	Mario Matt	Austria	9 (2000–2014)	15	–	–	–	14	1	–	NA	–	–
	Clément Noël	France	8 (2019–2026)	15	–	–	–	15	–	–	–	–	NA
35	Andreas Wenzel	Liechtenstein	6 (1978–1985)	14	–	1	3	4	6	–	NA	NA	NA
	Günther Mader	Austria	9 (1986–1996)	14	1	6	2	1	4	–	NA	NA	NA
	Kalle Palander	Finland	5 (2003–2008)	14	–	–	4	10	–	–	NA	–	–
38	Patrick Russel	France	4 (1968–1971)	13	–	NA	4	9	NA	–	NA	NA	NA
	Kristian Ghedina	Italy	7 (1990–2002)	13	12	1	–	–	–	–	NA	–	NA
	Hannes Reichelt	Austria	7 (2006–2017)	13	6	6	1	–	–	–	–	–	–
	Felix Neureuther	Germany	6 (2010–2018)	13	–	–	1	11	–	–	–	1	NA
42	Karl Schranz	Austria	3 (1969–1972)	12	8	–	4	–	–	–	NA	NA	NA
	Piero Gros	Italy	3 (1973–1975)	12	–	–	7	5	–	–	NA	NA	NA
	Luc Alphand	France	3 (1995–1997)	12	10	2	–	–	–	–	NA	NA	NA
	Daron Rahlves	United States	5 (2000–2006)	12	9	3	–	–	–	–	NA	NA	–
48	Giorgio Rocca	Italy	4 (2003–2006)	11	–	–	–	11	–	–	NA	NA	–
	Carlo Janka	Switzerland	5 (2009–2016)	11	3	1	4	–	3	–	–	–	NA
	Matthias Mayer	Austria	7 (2014–2022)	11	7	3	–	–	1	–	–	–	NA
49	Bernhard Russi	Switzerland	5 (1970–1977)	10	9	–	1	–	–	–	NA	NA	NA
	Helmut Höflehner	Austria	5 (1983–1990)	10	10	–	–	–	–	–	NA	NA	NA
	Thomas Stangassinger	Austria	6 (1990–1999)	10	–	–	–	10	–	–	NA	NA	NA
	Lucas Braathen	Norway	3 (2021–2023)	10	–	–	5	5	–	–	–	–	NA
	Lucas Braathen	Brazil	2 (2026–2027)	10	–	–	5	5	–	–	–	–	NA
53	Steve Mahre	United States	4 (1978–1983)	9	–	–	2	6	1	–	NA	NA	NA
	Markus Wasmeier	West Germany; Germany	3 (1986–1988); 2 (1991–1992)	9	2	6	–	–	1	–	NA	NA	NA
	Thomas Sykora	Austria	3 (1996–1998)	9	–	–	–	9	–	–	NA	NA	NA
	Ole Kristian Furuseth	Norway	7 (1989–2000)	9	–	–	3	6	–	–	NA	NA	NA
	Fritz Strobl	Austria	5 (1997–2006)	9	7	2	–	–	–	–	NA	NA	–
	Reinfried Herbst	Austria	4 (2006–2010)	9	–	–	–	9	–	–	–	–	–
	Jean-Baptiste Grange	France	3 (2008–2011)	9	–	–	–	8	1	–	–	–	NA
	Loïc Meillard	Switzerland	5 (2020–2026)	9	–	–	6	2	–	–	1	–	NA
61	Roland Collombin	Switzerland	2 (1973–1974)	8	8	–	–	–	–	–	NA	NA	NA
	Steve Podborski	Canada	4 (1979–1984)	8	8	–	–	–	–	–	NA	NA	NA
	Peter Wirnsberger	Austria	4 (1979–1986)	8	8	–	–	–	–	–	NA	NA	NA
	Bojan Križaj	Yugoslavia	7 (1980–1987)	8	–	–	–	8	–	–	NA	NA	NA
	Rudolf Nierlich	Austria	4 (1988–1991)	8	–	–	3	5	–	–	NA	NA	NA
	Daniel Mahrer	Switzerland	6 (1985–1993)	8	7	1	–	–	–	–	NA	NA	NA
	Andreas Schifferer	Austria	4 (1997–2000)	8	7	1	–	–	–	–	NA	NA	–
	André Myhrer	Sweden	6 (2007–2018)	8	–	–	–	7	–	–	–	1	NA
	Marco Schwarz	Austria	5 (2019–2026)	8	–	1	2	3	1	–	–	1	NA
70	Joël Gaspoz	Switzerland	3 (1982–1987)	7	–	–	6	1	–	–	NA	NA	NA
	Armin Bittner	West Germany	3 (1987–1990)	7	–	–	–	7	–	–	NA	NA	NA
	Paul Accola	Switzerland	1 (1992)	7	–	2	1	1	3	–	NA	NA	NA
	Atle Skårdal	Norway	5 (1990–1996)	7	6	1	–	–	–	–	NA	NA	NA
	Finn Christian Jagge	Norway	6 (1992–2000)	7	–	–	–	7	–	–	NA	–	–
	Josef Strobl	Austria	4 (1995–2000)	7	3	2	1	–	–	1	NA	NA	–
	Christian Mayer	Austria	4 (1994–2000)	7	–	1	6	–	–	–	NA	NA	–
	Fredrik Nyberg	Sweden	6 (1990–2002)	7	–	1	6	–	–	–	NA	NA	–
	Hans Knauß	Austria	5 (1996–2003)	7	1	3	3	–	–	–	NA	NA	–
	Massimiliano Blardone	Italy	6 (2005–2012)	7	–	–	7	–	–	–	–	–	–
	Daniel Yule	Switzerland	4 (2019–2024)	7	–	–	–	7	–	–	–	–	NA
	Manuel Feller	Austria	3 (2021–2026)	7	–	–	–	7	–	–	–	–	NA
82	Henri Duvillard	France	5 (1969–1973)	6	3	–	2	1	–	–	NA	NA	NA
	Hansi Hinterseer	Austria	5 (1973–1977)	6	–	–	3	3	–	–	NA	NA	NA
	Christian Neureuther	West Germany	3 (1973–1979)	6	–	–	–	6	–	–	NA	NA	NA
	Harti Weirather	Austria	3 (1981–1983)	6	6	–	–	–	–	–	NA	NA	NA
	Peter Lüscher	Switzerland	3 (1979–1983)	6	1	1	–	1	3	–	NA	NA	NA
	Hans Enn	Austria	4 (1980–1985)	6	–	1	5	–	–	–	NA	NA	NA
	Hannes Trinkl	Austria	3 (1994–2002)	6	5	1	–	–	–	–	NA	NA	–
	Klaus Kröll	Austria	3 (2009–2012)	6	4	2	–	–	–	–	–	–	–
	Christof Innerhofer	Italy	4 (2009–2013)	6	4	1	–	–	1	–	–	–	NA
	Ramon Zenhäusern	Switzerland	4 (2018–2023)	6	–	–	–	4	–	–	–	2	NA
	Atle Lie McGrath	Norway	3 (2022–2026)	6	–	–	–	6	–	–	–	–	NA
	Timon Haugan	Norway	3 (2024–2026)	6	–	–	–	6	–	–	–	–	NA
94	Dumeng Giovanoli	Switzerland	3 (1968–1970)	5	–	–	3	2	–	–	NA	NA	NA
	Alain Penz	France	2 (1969–1970)	5	–	–	1	4	–	–	NA	NA	NA
	Edmund Bruggmann	Switzerland	4 (1968–1972)	5	–	–	4	1	–	–	NA	NA	NA
	Klaus Heidegger	Austria	2 (1977–1978)	5	–	–	2	3	–	–	NA	NA	NA
	Josef Walcher	Austria	3 (1977–1979)	5	5	–	–	–	–	–	NA	NA	NA
	Erik Håker	Norway	4 (1972–1979)	5	1	–	4	–	–	–	NA	NA	NA
	Ken Read	Canada	4 (1976–1980)	5	5	–	–	–	–	–	NA	NA	NA
	Herbert Plank	Italy	4 (1974–1980)	5	5	–	–	–	–	–	NA	NA	NA
	Rok Petrovič	Yugoslavia	1 (1986)	5	–	–	–	5	–	–	NA	NA	NA
	Anton Steiner	Austria	4 (1979–1986)	5	2	–	–	–	3	–	NA	NA	NA
	Karl Alpiger	Switzerland	4 (1985–1989)	5	5	–	–	–	–	–	NA	NA	NA
	Thomas Fogdö	Sweden	2 (1991–1993)	5	–	–	–	5	–	–	NA	NA	NA
	Rainer Schönfelder	Austria	4 (2000–2004)	5	–	–	–	5	–	–	NA	–	–
	Christoph Gruber	Austria	4 (2001–2008)	5	–	4	1	–	–	–	NA	NA	–
	Didier Défago	Switzerland	4 (2003–2014)	5	3	2	–	–	–	–	NA	–	–
	Erik Guay	Canada	3 (2007–2014)	5	3	2	–	–	–	–	–	–	–
	Thomas Dreßen	Germany	2 (2018–2020)	5	5	–	–	–	–	–	–	–	NA
	Cyprien Sarrazin	France	2 (2017–2024)	5	3	1	–	–	–	–	1	–	NA
	Linus Straßer	Germany	4 (2017–2024)	5	–	–	–	4	–	–	–	1	NA
	Franjo von Allmen	Switzerland	2 (2025–2026)	5	4	1	–	–	–	–	–	–	NA
114	Reinhard Tritscher	Austria	2 (1969–1973)	4	1	–	2	1	–	–	NA	NA	NA
	Walter Tresch	Switzerland	3 (1971–1977)	4	1	–	–	–	3	–	NA	NA	NA
	Heini Hemmi	Switzerland	2 (1976–1977)	4	–	–	4	–	–	–	NA	NA	NA
	Aleksandr Zhirov	Soviet Union	1 (1981)	4	–	–	3	1	–	–	NA	NA	NA
	Paul Frommelt	Liechtenstein	4 (1979–1988)	4	–	–	–	4	–	–	NA	NA	NA
	Franck Piccard	France	4 (1988–1994)	4	1	2	1	–	–	–	NA	NA	NA
	William Besse	Switzerland	3 (1992–1994)	4	4	–	–	–	–	–	NA	NA	NA
	Armin Assinger	Austria	2 (1993–1995)	4	3	1	–	–	–	–	NA	NA	NA
	Patrick Ortlieb	Austria	3 (1994–1996)	4	3	1	–	–	–	–	NA	NA	NA
	Johann Grugger	Austria	3 (2005–2007)	4	2	2	–	–	–	–	NA	NA	–
	Marco Büchel	Liechtenstein	4 (2003–2008)	4	2	2	–	–	–	–	NA	NA	–
	Daniel Albrecht	Switzerland	2 (2008–2009)	4	–	–	3	–	1	–	NA	–	NA
126	Gerhard Nenning	Austria	1 (1968)	3	3	NA	–	–	NA	NA	NA	NA	NA
	Herbert Huber	Austria	2 (1967–1968)	3	–	–	2	1	–	–	NA	NA	NA
	Karl Cordin	Austria	3 (1970–1971)	3	3	–	–	–	–	–	NA	NA	NA
	Sepp Ferstl	West Germany	3 (1977–1979)	3	2	–	–	–	1	–	NA	NA	NA
	Erwin Resch	Austria	3 (1982–1984)	3	3	–	–	–	–	–	NA	NA	NA
	Bill Johnson	United States	1 (1984)	3	3	–	–	–	–	–	NA	NA	NA
	Todd Brooker	Canada	2 (1983–1985)	3	3	–	–	–	–	–	NA	NA	NA
	Richard Pramotton	Italy	2 (1986–1987)	3	–	–	3	–	–	–	NA	NA	NA
	Michael Mair	Italy	3 (1983–1988)	3	2	1	–	–	–	–	NA	NA	NA
	Martin Hangl	Switzerland	2 (1988–1989)	3	–	2	1	–	–	–	NA	NA	NA
	Rob Boyd	Canada	3 (1987–1989)	3	3	–	–	–	–	–	NA	NA	NA
	Leonhard Stock	Austria	3 (1989–1993)	3	3	–	–	–	–	–	NA	NA	NA
	Jan Einar Thorsen	Norway	2 (1993–1994)	3	–	2	1	–	–	–	NA	NA	NA
	Richard Kröll	Austria	2 (1990–1995)	3	–	1	2	–	–	–	NA	NA	NA
	Michael Tritscher	Austria	3 (1991–1996)	3	–	–	–	3	–	–	NA	NA	NA
	Urs Kälin	Switzerland	2 (1990–1996)	3	–	–	3	–	–	–	NA	NA	NA
	Steve Locher	Switzerland	3 (1990–1997)	3	–	1	2	–	–	–	NA	NA	NA
	Mario Reiter	Austria	3 (1995–1997)	3	–	–	1	2	–	–	NA	NA	NA
	Jure Košir	Slovenia	2 (1994–1999)	3	–	–	–	3	–	–	NA	–	NA
	Pierrick Bourgeat	France	2 (1999–2001)	3	–	–	–	3	–	–	NA	NA	–
	Bruno Kernen	Switzerland	2 (1996–2003)	3	3	–	–	–	–	–	NA	NA	NA
	Antoine Dénériaz	France	2 (2003–2004)	3	3	–	–	–	–	–	NA	NA	–
	Manfred Pranger	Austria	2 (2005–2009)	3	–	–	–	3	–	–	NA	–	–
	Werner Heel	Italy	2 (2008–2009)	3	1	2	–	–	–	–	–	–	–
	Manuel Osborne-Paradis	Canada	2 (2009–2010)	3	2	1	–	–	–	–	–	–	NA
	Julien Lizeroux	France	2 (2009–2010)	3	–	–	–	3	–	–	–	–	–
	Georg Streitberger	Austria	3 (2008–2014)	3	1	2	–	–	–	–	–	–	–
	Steven Nyman	United States	3 (2007–2015)	3	3	–	–	–	–	–	–	–	–
	Adrien Théaux	France	3 (2011–2016)	3	3	–	–	–	–	–	–	–	NA
	Manfred Mölgg	Italy	3 (2008–2017)	3	–	–	–	3	–	–	–	–	NA
	Peter Fill	Italy	3 (2009–2017)	3	2	1	–	–	–	–	–	–	–
	Niels Hintermann	Switzerland	3 (2017–2024)	3	2	–	–	–	1	–	–	–	NA
	Max Franz	Austria	2 (2017–2019)	3	2	1	–	–	–	–	–	–	NA
	Filip Zubčić	Croatia	2 (2020–2021)	3	–	–	3	–	–	–	–	–	NA
	Alexander Steen Olsen	Norway	2 (2023–2025)	3	–	–	2	1	–	–	–	–	NA
161	Guy Périllat	France	1 (1967)	2	–	NA	–	2	NA	NA	NA	NA	NA
	Billy Kidd	United States	2 (1968–1969)	2	–	–	–	2	–	–	NA	NA	NA
	Alfred Matt	Austria	1 (1969)	2	–	NA	–	2	NA	NA	NA	NA	NA
	Werner Bleiner	Austria	2 (1968–1970)	2	–	–	2	–	–	–	NA	NA	NA
	Jean-Daniel Dätwyler	Switzerland	2 (1969–1971)	2	2	–	–	–	–	–	NA	NA	NA
	Tyler Palmer	United States	2 (1971–1972)	2	–	–	–	2	–	–	NA	NA	NA
	Roland Thöni	Italy	1 (1972)	2	–	NA	–	2	–	–	NA	NA	NA
	David Zwilling	Austria	2 (1971–1973)	2	–	–	2	–	–	–	NA	NA	NA
	Fausto Radici	Italy	2 (1976–1977)	2	–	–	–	2	–	–	NA	NA	NA
	Uli Spieß	Austria	2 (1978–1981)	2	2	–	–	–	–	–	NA	NA	NA
	Toni Bürgler	Switzerland	2 (1979–1981)	2	2	–	–	–	–	–	NA	NA	NA
	Conradin Cathomen	Switzerland	1 (1983)	2	2	–	–	–	–	–	NA	NA	NA
	Stig Strand	Sweden	1 (1983)	2	–	–	–	2	–	–	NA	NA	NA
	Urs Räber	Switzerland	1 (1984)	2	2	–	–	–	–	–	NA	NA	NA
	Thomas Bürgler	Switzerland	1 (1985)	2	–	–	2	–	–	–	NA	NA	NA
	Lars-Börje Eriksson	Sweden	2 (1989–1990)	2	–	1	1	–	–	–	NA	NA	NA
	Jonas Nilsson	Sweden	2 (1986–1990)	2	–	–	–	2	–	–	NA	NA	NA
	Patrice Bianchi	France	2 (1992–1993)	2	–	–	–	2	–	–	NA	NA	NA
	Kyle Rasmussen	United States	1 (1995)	2	2	–	–	–	–	–	NA	NA	NA
	Werner Perathoner	Italy	2 (1995–1996)	2	–	2	–	–	–	–	NA	NA	NA
	Peter Runggaldier	Italy	2 (1995–1996)	2	–	2	–	–	–	–	NA	NA	NA
	Patrick Holzer	Italy	2 (1992–1999)	2	–	1	1	–	–	–	NA	NA	–
	Didier Plaschy	Switzerland	1 (2000)	2	–	–	–	2	–	–	NA	NA	–
	Frédéric Covili	France	1 (2002)	2	–	–	2	–	–	–	NA	NA	–
	Alessandro Fattori	Italy	2 (2001–2002)	2	1	1	–	–	–	–	NA	NA	–
	Werner Franz	Austria	2 (2000–2005)	2	1	1	–	–	–	–	NA	NA	–
	Thomas Grandi	Canada	1 (2005)	2	–	–	2	–	–	–	NA	NA	–
	Stephan Görgl	Austria	1 (2005)	2	–	1	1	–	–	–	NA	–	–
	Jean-Pierre Vidal	France	2 (2002–2006)	2	–	–	–	2	–	–	NA	NA	–
	Davide Simoncelli	Italy	2 (2004–2006)	2	–	–	2	–	–	–	–	–	–
	Markus Larsson	Sweden	2 (2006–2007)	2	–	–	–	2	–	–	–	–	–
	Jens Byggmark	Sweden	1 (2007)	2	–	–	–	2	–	–	–	–	NA
	Marc Berthod	Switzerland	2 (2007–2008)	2	–	–	1	1	–	–	–	–	NA
	Andrej Jerman	Slovenia	2 (2007–2010)	2	2	–	–	–	–	–	NA	–	–
	Silvan Zurbriggen	Switzerland	2 (2009–2011)	2	1	–	–	–	1	–	NA	–	–
	Giuliano Razzoli	Italy	2 (2010–2011)	2	–	–	–	2	–	–	–	–	NA
	Jan Hudec	Canada	2 (2008–2012)	2	2	–	–	–	–	–	–	–	–
	Romed Baumann	Austria	2 (2009–2012)	2	–	–	–	–	2	–	–	–	NA
	Patrick Küng	Switzerland	1 (2014)	2	1	1	–	–	–	–	–	–	NA
	Travis Ganong	United States	2 (2015–2017)	2	2	–	–	–	–	–	–	–	NA
	Josef Ferstl	Germany	2 (2018–2019)	2	–	2	–	–	–	–	–	–	NA
	Sebastian Foss-Solevåg	Norway	2 (2021–2022)	2	–	–	–	2	–	–	–	–	NA
	Žan Kranjec	Slovenia	2 (2019–2020)	2	–	–	2	–	–	–	–	–	NA
	Mathieu Faivre	France	2 (2017–2021)	2	–	–	2	–	–	–	–	–	NA
	Bryce Bennett	United States	2 (2022–2024)	2	2	–	–	–	–	–	–	–	NA
	Paco Rassat	France	1 (2026)	2	–	–	–	2	–	–	–	–	NA
	Giovanni Franzoni	Italy	1 (2026)	2	1	1	–	–	–	–	–	–	NA
208	Heinrich Messner	Austria	1 (1967)	1	–	NA	–	1	NA	NA	NA	NA	NA
	Georges Mauduit	France	1 (1967)	1	–	NA	1	–	NA	NA	NA	NA	NA
	Bernard Orcel	France	1 (1968)	1	1	NA	–	–	NA	NA	NA	NA	NA
	Spider Sabich	United States	1 (1968)	1	–	NA	–	1	NA	NA	NA	NA	NA
	Josef Minsch	Switzerland	1 (1969)	1	1	NA	–	–	NA	NA	NA	NA	NA
	Malcolm Milne	Australia	1 (1970)	1	1	NA	–	–	NA	NA	NA	NA	NA
	Henri Bréchu	France	1 (1970)	1	–	NA	–	1	NA	NA	NA	NA	NA
	Stefano Anzi	Italy	1 (1971)	1	1	NA	–	–	NA	NA	NA	NA	NA
	Roger Rossat-Mignod	France	1 (1972)	1	–	NA	1	–	NA	NA	NA	NA	NA
	Werner Mattle	Switzerland	1 (1972)	1	–	NA	1	–	–	–	NA	NA	NA
	Andrzej Bachleda	Poland	1 (1972)	1	–	NA	–	1	NA	NA	NA	NA	NA
	Franz Vogler	West Germany	1 (1972)	1	1	NA	–	–	NA	NA	NA	NA	NA
	Werner Grissmann	Austria	1 (1973)	1	1	NA	–	–	–	–	NA	NA	NA
	Max Rieger	West Germany	1 (1973)	1	–	NA	1	–	–	–	NA	NA	NA
	Bob Cochran	United States	1 (1973)	1	–	NA	1	–	NA	NA	NA	NA	NA
	Hubert Berchtold	Austria	1 (1974)	1	–	NA	1	–	–	–	NA	NA	NA
	Francisco Fernández Ochoa	Spain	1 (1974)	1	–	NA	–	1	–	–	NA	NA	NA
	Walter Vesti	Switzerland	1 (1975)	1	1	–	–	–	–	–	NA	NA	NA
	Engelhard Pargätzi	Switzerland	1 (1976)	1	–	NA	1	–	–	–	NA	NA	NA
	Dave Irwin	Canada	1 (1976)	1	1	–	–	–	–	–	NA	NA	NA
	Franco Bieler	Italy	1 (1976)	1	–	NA	1	–	–	–	NA	NA	NA
	Greg Jones	United States	1 (1976)	1	–	NA	1	–	–	–	NA	NA	NA
	Bartl Gensbichler	Austria	1 (1977)	1	1	NA	–	–	–	–	NA	NA	NA
	Martial Donnet	Switzerland	1 (1979)	1	–	NA	–	1	–	–	NA	NA	NA
	Leonardo David	Italy	1 (1979)	1	–	NA	–	1	–	–	NA	NA	NA
	Petar Popangelov	Bulgaria	1 (1980)	1	–	–	–	1	–	–	NA	NA	NA
	Christian Orlainsky	Austria	1 (1981)	1	–	–	1	–	–	–	NA	NA	NA
	Valeri Tsyganov	Soviet Union	1 (1981)	1	1	–	–	–	–	–	NA	NA	NA
	Boris Strel	Yugoslavia	1 (1982)	1	–	–	1	–	–	–	NA	NA	NA
	Bruno Kernen	Switzerland	1 (1983)	1	1	–	–	–	–	–	NA	NA	NA
	Gerhard Pfaffenbichler	Austria	1 (1983)	1	1	–	–	–	–	–	NA	NA	NA
	Franz Gruber	Austria	1 (1983)	1	–	–	–	1	–	–	NA	NA	NA
	Max Julen	Switzerland	1 (1984)	1	–	–	1	–	–	–	NA	NA	NA
	Robert Zoller	Austria	1 (1984)	1	–	–	–	1	–	–	NA	NA	NA
	Robert Erlacher	Italy	1 (1985)	1	–	–	1	–	–	–	NA	NA	NA
	Michel Vion	France	1 (1985)	1	–	–	–	–	1	–	NA	NA	NA
	Steven Lee	Australia	1 (1985)	1	–	1	–	–	–	–	NA	NA	NA
	Johan Wallner	Sweden	1 (1986)	1	–	–	–	1	–	–	NA	NA	NA
	Didier Bouvet	France	1 (1986)	1	–	–	–	1	–	–	NA	NA	NA
	Ivano Edalini	Italy	1 (1987)	1	–	–	–	1	–	–	NA	NA	NA
	Grega Benedik	Yugoslavia	1 (1987)	1	–	–	–	1	–	–	NA	NA	NA
	Helmut Mayer	Austria	1 (1988)	1	–	–	1	–	–	–	NA	NA	NA
	Bernhard Gstrein	Austria	1 (1988)	1	–	–	–	1	–	–	NA	NA	NA
	Hubert Strolz	Austria	1 (1988)	1	–	–	–	–	1	–	NA	NA	NA
	Felix Belczyk	Canada	1 (1988)	1	–	1	–	–	–	–	NA	NA	NA
	Niklas Henning	Sweden	1 (1990)	1	–	1	–	–	–	–	NA	NA	NA
	Peter Roth	Germany	1 (1991)	1	–	–	–	1	–	–	NA	NA	NA
	A. J. Kitt	United States	1 (1992)	1	1	–	–	–	–	–	NA	NA	NA
	Sergio Bergamelli	Italy	1 (1992)	1	–	–	1	–	–	–	NA	NA	NA
	Didrik Marksten	Norway	1 (1992)	1	–	–	1	–	–	–	NA	NA	NA
	Fabrizio Tescari	Italy	1 (1993)	1	–	–	–	1	–	–	NA	NA	NA
	Adrien Duvillard	France	1 (1993)	1	1	–	–	–	–	–	NA	NA	NA
	Markus Foser	Liechtenstein	1 (1994)	1	1	–	–	–	–	–	NA	NA	NA
	Ed Podivinsky	Canada	1 (1994)	1	1	–	–	–	–	–	NA	NA	NA
	Cary Mullen	Canada	1 (1994)	1	1	–	–	–	–	–	NA	NA	NA
	Tommy Moe	United States	1 (1994)	1	–	1	–	–	–	–	NA	NA	NA
	Achim Vogt	Liechtenstein	1 (1995)	1	–	–	1	–	–	–	NA	–	NA
	Andrej Miklavc	Slovenia	1 (1996)	1	–	–	–	1	–	–	NA	NA	NA
	Sébastien Amiez	France	1 (1996)	1	–	–	–	1	–	–	NA	NA	–
	Tom Stiansen	Norway	1 (1997)	1	–	–	–	1	–	–	NA	NA	–
	Nicolas Burtin	France	1 (1998)	1	1	–	–	–	–	–	NA	NA	–
	Joël Chenal	France	1 (2000)	1	–	–	1	–	–	–	NA	NA	–
	Angelo Weiss	Italy	1 (2000)	1	–	–	–	1	–	–	NA	NA	–
	Matjaž Vrhovnik	Slovenia	1 (2000)	1	–	–	–	1	–	–	NA	NA	–
	Mitja Kunc	Slovenia	1 (2000)	1	–	–	–	1	–	–	NA	NA	–
	Heinz Schilchegger	Austria	1 (2001)	1	–	–	–	1	–	–	NA	NA	–
	Hans Petter Buraas	Norway	1 (2001)	1	–	–	–	1	–	–	NA	NA	–
	Christian Greber	Austria	1 (2002)	1	1	–	–	–	–	–	NA	NA	–
	Bjarne Solbakken	Norway	1 (2004)	1	–	1	–	–	–	–	NA	NA	–
	Truls Ove Karlsen	Norway	1 (2004)	1	–	–	–	1	–	–	NA	–	–
	Max Rauffer	Germany	1 (2005)	1	1	–	–	–	–	–	NA	–	–
	Alois Vogl	Germany	1 (2005)	1	–	–	–	1	–	–	NA	–	–
	John Kucera	Canada	1 (2007)	1	–	1	–	–	–	–	–	–	NA
	Pierre-Emmanuel Dalcin	France	1 (2007)	1	1	–	–	–	–	–	NA	NA	–
	Marc Gini	Switzerland	1 (2008)	1	–	–	–	1	–	–	–	–	–
	Marco Sullivan	United States	1 (2008)	1	1	–	–	–	–	–	–	–	–
	Tobias Grünenfelder	Switzerland	1 (2011)	1	–	1	–	–	–	–	NA	–	–
	Cyprien Richard	France	1 (2011)	1	–	–	1	–	–	–	–	–	–
	Philipp Schörghofer	Austria	1 (2011)	1	–	–	1	–	–	–	–	–	NA
	Sandro Viletta	Switzerland	1 (2012)	1	–	1	–	–	–	–	–	–	NA
	Cristian Deville	Italy	1 (2012)	1	–	–	–	1	–	–	–	–	NA
	Matteo Marsaglia	Italy	1 (2013)	1	–	1	–	–	–	–	–	–	NA
	Mattias Hargin	Sweden	1 (2015)	1	–	–	–	1	–	–	–	–	NA
	Dustin Cook	Canada	1 (2015)	1	–	1	–	–	–	–	–	–	NA
	Stefano Gross	Italy	1 (2015)	1	–	–	–	1	–	–	–	–	NA
	Aleksandr Khoroshilov	Russia	1 (2015)	1	–	–	–	1	–	–	–	–	NA
	Thomas Fanara	France	1 (2016)	1	–	–	1	–	–	–	–	–	NA
	Boštjan Kline	Slovenia	1 (2017)	1	1	–	–	–	–	–	–	–	NA
	Matts Olsson	Sweden	1 (2018)	1	–	–	–	–	–	–	1	–	NA
	Stefan Luitz	Germany	1 (2019)	1	–	–	1	–	–	–	–	–	NA
	Rasmus Windingstad	Norway	1 (2020)	1	–	–	–	–	–	–	1	–	NA
	Mauro Caviezel	Switzerland	1 (2021)	1	–	1	–	–	–	–	–	–	NA
	Christian Hirschbühl	Austria	1 (2022)	1	–	–	–	–	–	–	1	–	NA
	Dave Ryding	United Kingdom	1 (2022)	1	–	–	–	1	–	–	–	–	NA
	Michael Matt	Austria	1 (2017)	1	–	–	–	1	–	–	–	–	NA
	Victor Muffat-Jeandet	France	1 (2018)	1	–	–	–	–	1	–	–	–	NA
	Tommy Ford	United States	1 (2020)	1	–	–	1	–	–	–	–	–	NA
	Martin Čater	Slovenia	1 (2021)	1	1	–	–	–	–	–	–	–	NA
	Ryan Cochran-Siegle	United States	1 (2021)	1	–	1	–	–	–	–	–	–	NA
	Johannes Strolz	Austria	1 (2022)	1	–	–	–	1	–	–	–	–	NA
	Cameron Alexander	Canada	1 (2022)	1	1	–	–	–	–	–	–	–	NA
	Nils Allègre	France	1 (2024)	1	–	1	–	–	–	–	–	–	NA
	Stefan Rogentin	Switzerland	1 (2024)	1	–	1	–	–	–	–	–	–	NA
	Justin Murisier	Switzerland	1 (2025)	1	1	–	–	–	–	–	–	–	NA
	Thomas Tumler	Switzerland	1 (2025)	1	–	–	1	–	–	–	–	–	NA
	Mattia Casse	Italy	1 (2025)	1	–	1	–	–	–	–	–	–	NA
	Alexis Monney	Switzerland	1 (2025)	1	1	–	–	–	–	–	–	–	NA
	Fredrik Møller	Norway	1 (2025)	1	–	1	–	–	–	–	–	–	NA
	Albert Popov	Bulgaria	1 (2025)	1	–	–	–	1	–	–	–	–	NA
	James Crawford	Canada	1 (2025)	1	1	–	–	–	–	–	–	–	NA
	Lukas Feurstein	Austria	1 (2025)	1	–	1	–	–	–	–	–	–	NA
	Stefan Brennsteiner	Austria	1 (2026)	1	–	–	1	–	–	–	–	–	NA
	Jan Zabystřan	Czech Republic	1 (2026)	1	–	1	–	–	–	–	–	–	NA

== Milestones ==
- First to win 10 races in one event: Jean-Noël Augert (slalom)
- First to win 20 races in one event: Franz Klammer (downhill)
- First to win 30 races in one event: Ingemar Stenmark (giant slalom)
- First to win 40 races in one event: Ingemar Stenmark (giant slalom)
- First to win 10 races in two events: Ingemar Stenmark (giant slalom and slalom)
- First to win 20 races in two events: Ingemar Stenmark (giant slalom and slalom)
- First to win 30 races in two events: Ingemar Stenmark (giant slalom and slalom)
- First to win 40 races in two events: Ingemar Stenmark (giant slalom and slalom)
- First to win races in three events: Jean-Claude Killy (giant slalom, downhill and slalom)
- First to win races in four events: Gustav Thöni (giant slalom, slalom, parallel slalom and combined)
- First to win races in five events: Pirmin Zurbriggen (downhill, super-G, giant slalom, slalom and combined)
- First to win ten races in three events: Pirmin Zurbriggen (downhill, super-G, and combined)
- First to win five races in four events: Pirmin Zurbriggen (downhill, super-G, giant slalom, and combined)
- First to win five races in all five events: Bode Miller
- NA – Disciplines did not exist yet
- Seasons are shown in which the racer won.
- Ties are shown in chronological order.

== Consecutive seasons with at least one win ==
Still active

Skier	First & last	Wins
(Italy) Alberto Tomba	1988–1998	11
(Sweden) Ingemar Stenmark	1975–1984	10
(Austria) Marcel Hirscher	2010–2019	10
(France) Alexis Pinturault	2012–2021	10
(Italy) Dominik Paris	2013–2022	10
(Norway) Henrik Kristoffersen	2014–2023	10
(Switzerland) Pirmin Zurbriggen	1982–1990	9
(Austria) Michael Walchhofer	2003–2011	9
(Norway) Aksel Lund Svindal	2006–2014	9
(United States) Ted Ligety	2008–2016	9
(Italy) Gustav Thöni	1970–1977	8
(Austria) Günther Mader	1990–1997	8
(Norway) Kjetil Jansrud	2014–2020	7
(United States) Phil Mahre	1977–1983	7
(United States) Bode Miller	2002–2008	7
(Austria) Benjamin Raich	2004–2010	7
(Austria) Vincent Kriechmayr	2018–2024	7
(Switzerland) Marco Odermatt	2020–2026	7
(Luxembourg) Marc Girardelli	1991–1996	6
(Switzerland) Didier Cuche	2007–2012	6

== Statistics ==
	Seasons	Total	DH	SG	GS	SL	KB	PSL	CE	PGS	K.O.
Individual events	1967–active	2002	549	260	476	562	134	2	10	8	1
Double wins	1967–active	12	5	4	1	2	–	–	–	–	–
Total winners	1967–active	2014	554	264	477	564	134	2	10	8	1
Different winners by discipline	1967–active	320	127	93	106	122	40	2	8	8	1

== See also ==
- List of FIS Alpine Ski World Cup women's race winners
