= 1979 Alpine Skiing World Cup – Men's slalom =

1979 Men's slalom World Cup
Previous: 1978	Next: 1980

Men's slalom World Cup 1978/1979

== Final point standings ==
In men's slalom World Cup 1978/79 the best 5 results count. Seven racers had a point deduction, which are given in brackets. Ingemar Stenmark won his fifth Slalom World Cup in a row.

Place	Name	Country	Total points	Deduction	4 (Italy)	7 (Socialist Federal Republic of Yugoslavia)	11 (Switzerland)	13 (Switzerland)	17 (Austria)	21 (Germany)	25 (Czechoslovakia)	26 (Norway)	28 (Sweden)	32 (Japan)
1	Ingemar Stenmark	Sweden	119	(41)	-	25	-	(15)	20	(11)	(15)	24	25	25
2	Phil Mahre	United States	107	(10)	-	-	(8)	(2)	15	20	25	23	24	-
3	Christian Neureuther	West Germany	97		15	-	25	8	25	-	-	-	-	24
4	Petar Popangelov	Bulgaria	96	(14)	(11)	-	20	-	-	15	(3)	19	20	22
5	Paul Frommelt	Liechtenstein	92	(3)	-	20	(3)	25	11	-	-	-	13	23
6	Peter Lüscher	Switzerland	72	(3)	20	-	-	(3)	-	25	4	-	11	12
7	Piero Gros	Italy	71	(13)	6	(4)	(6)	-	(3)	8	-	21	19	17
8	Leonardo David	Italy	70		4	15	-	-	6	-	20	25	-	-
9	Gustav Thöni	Italy	64	(4)	(3)	-	(1)	-	6	4	-	18	23	13
10	Martial Donnet	Switzerland	63		25	1	11	6	-	-	-	-	-	20
11	Christian Orlainsky	Austria	52		-	-	-	-	-	-	11	20	21	-
12	Bojan Križaj	Yugoslavia	49		8	11	-	-	-	3	-	-	6	21
13	Steve Mahre	United States	47		-	-	-	-	-	-	6	-	22	19
14	Anton Steiner	Austria	42		-	2	-	4	-	-	8	-	12	16
15	Andreas Wenzel	Liechtenstein	41		-	-	6	20	1	6	-	-	8	-
16	Klaus Heidegger	Austria	40		-	6	-	-	8	-	-	8	-	18
17	Torsten Jakobsson	Sweden	34		-	-	-	-	-	-	-	13	18	3
18	Franz Gruber	Austria	33		-	-	-	-	-	-	1	22	10	-
19	Karl Trojer	Italy	31		1	-	15	-	-	-	-	15	-	-
20	Helmut Gstrein	Austria	27		-	-	-	-	-	-	-	10	17	-
	Jacques Lüthy	Switzerland	27		-	-	-	-	-	2	-	14	-	11
22	Peter Mally	Italy	26		-	-	2	11	-	-	2	11	-	-
	Wolfram Ortner	Austria	26		-	-	-	-	-	-	-	17	9	-
24	Bohumír Zeman	Czechoslovakia	25		-	-	-	-	-	-	-	-	15	10
25	Hans Enn	Austria	18		-	-	-	1	-	1	-	-	16	-
26	Leonhard Stock	Austria	17		-	-	-	-	-	-	-	2	-	15
27	Jože Kuralt	Yugoslavia	16		-	-	-	1	-	-	-	16	-	-
28	Mauro Bernardi	Italy	14		-	-	-	-	-	-	-	-	14	-
	Pete Patterson	United States	14		-	-	-	1	-	-	-	-	-	14
30	Bjørn Gefle	Norway	12		-	-	-	-	-	-	-	12	-	-
31	Stig Strand	Sweden	11		2	-	-	-	-	-	-	9	-	-
32	Toshihiro Kaiwa	Japan	10		-	-	-	-	-	-	-	-	1	9
33	Philippe Hardy	France	8		-	8	-	-	-	-	-	-	-	-
	Frank Wörndl	West Germany	8		-	3	-	-	-	-	-	-	5	-
	Boris Strel	Yugoslavia	8		-	-	-	-	-	-	-	-	-	8
36	Knut Erik Johannessen	Norway	7		-	-	-	-	-	-	-	7	-	-
	Peter Aellig	Switzerland	7		-	-	-	-	-	-	-	-	7	-
	Werner Rhyner	Switzerland	7		-	-	-	-	-	-	-	-	-	7
39	Mišo Magušar	Yugoslavia	6		-	-	-	-	-	-	-	6	-	-
	Hiroshi Ohtaka	Japan	6		-	-	-	-	-	-	-	-	-	6
41	Jostein Masdal	Norway	5		-	-	-	-	-	-	-	5	-	-
	Hannes Spiss	Austria	5		-	-	-	-	-	-	-	-	5	-
	Aleksandr Zhirov	Soviet Union	5		-	-	-	-	-	-	-	3	2	-
	Osamu Kodama	Japan	5		-	-	-	-	-	-	-	-	-	5
45	Tor Melander	Sweden	4		-	-	-	-	-	-	-	4	-	-
	Manabu Sawaguchi	Japan	4		-	-	-	-	-	-	-	-	-	4
47	Vladimir Andreyev	Soviet Union	3		-	-	-	-	-	-	-	-	3	-
48	Bruno Nöckler	Italy	2		-	-	-	-	2	-	-	-	-	-
	Peter Wirnsberger	Austria	2		-	-	-	-	-	-	-	-	-	2
50	Marc Garcia	France	1		-	-	-	-	-	-	-	1	-	-
	Dagib Guliev	Soviet Union	1		-	-	-	-	-	-	-	-	-	1

Alpine Skiing World Cup
Men

Overall | Downhill | Giant slalom | Slalom | Combined

1979
