= West Encore / Rosi's Run =

World Cup ski course in Colorado, US

- Interactive map of West Encore / Rosi's Run
- Location in the United States Location in Colorado
- 39°29′53″N 106°08′49″W
- Location: Summit County, Colorado
- Mountain: Copper Mountain

Super-G
- Start: 11,545 feet (3,519 m) AMSL
- Finish: 9,803 feet (2,988 m)
- Vertical drop: 1,742 feet (531 m)
- Length: 1.130 miles (1.818 km)

Giant slalom
- Start: 11,188 feet (3,410 m) AMSL
- Finish: 9,803 feet (2,988 m)
- Vertical drop: 1,385 feet (422 m)

Slalom
- Start: 10,459 feet (3,188 m) AMSL
- Finish: 9,803 feet (2,988 m)
- Vertical drop: 656 feet (200 m)

West Encore / Rosi's Run is a World Cup ski course in the western United States, located at Copper Mountain in Summit County, Colorado. Its World Cup debut came 50 years ago in March 1976, the first events following the Winter Olympics. In recent years, the course has been used primarily for speed training.

The lower part of the course is named after Rosi Mittermaier of West Germany, who won both opening events in 1976, and went on to take the season's overall, slalom, and combined titles. At the recently completed Olympics in Innsbruck, Austria, she medaled in all three events, with two golds (downhill, slalom) and silver in the giant slalom.

The super-G course's starting elevation is 11,545 feet (3,519 m) above sea level, the second highest in World Cup history for both men and women. Its maximum gradient is 46%, with an average incline of 29% and a minimum incline of 20%.

== History ==
In early March 1976, the first World Cup events were held on this course; Copper Mountain was a late substitute for Heavenly Valley, which was low on snow. Rosi Mittermaier won both women's events (giant slalom, slalom), while American Greg Jones won the men's giant slalom and legendary Ingemar Stenmark of Sweden gained his sixth World Cup slalom win at age nineteen. The runners-up in the men's events were the eighteen-year-old Mahre twins: Phil in the giant slalom and Steve in the slalom, just a tenth of a second behind Stenmark and well ahead of five-time overall champion Gustav Thoeni.

After more than 23 years, World Cup racing returned to Copper Mountain in November 1999 with two women's technical events. Régine Cavagnoud won the giant slalom and the slalom finished in a tie with Christel Pascal and Špela Pretnar both on top.

Both 2001 events for women were replacements for Aspen, due to lack of snow. The giant slalom was won by Norway's Andrine Flemmen, and the slalom went to Laure Pequegnot of France.

In late November 2025, World Cup for men (super-G, giant slalom) returned to Copper Mountain after nearly a half century, and for women (GS, SL) after a 24-year absence. Switzerland's Marco Odermatt won the super-G on Thanksgiving Day, and Stefan Brennsteiner of Austria took the giant slalom. On the women's side, New Zealand's Alice Robinson won the giant slalom, becoming the winningest Alpine skier from outside Europe or North America in World Cup history, while Mikaela Shiffrin took home the slalom title.

== Sections ==
- Max Headroom
- Encore Face
- Sky Chute
- Black Bear
- Light Out
- Rosi's Face

== World Cup ==
=== Men ===
No.	Type	Season	Date	Winner	Second	Third
225	GS	1975/76	5 March 1976	(United States) Greg Jones	(United States) Phil Mahre	(Switzerland) Engelhard Pargatzi
226	SL	1975/76	7 March 1976	(Sweden) Ingemar Stenmark	(United States) Steve Mahre	(Italy) Gustav Thöni
1968	SG	2025/26	27 November 2025	(Switzerland) Marco Odermatt	(Austria) Vincent Kriechmayr	(Austria) Raphael Haaser
1969	GS	2025/26	28 November 2025	(Austria) Stefan Brennsteiner	(Norway) Henrik Kristoffersen	(Croatia) Filip Zubčić

=== Women ===
No.	Type	Season	Date	Winner	Second	Third
219	GS	1975/76	5 March 1976	(West Germany) Rosi Mittermaier	(United States) Cindy Nelson	(Switzerland) Bernadette Zurbriggen
220	SL	1975/76	6 March 1976	(West Germany) Rosi Mittermaier	(Austria) Monika Kaserer	(Switzerland) Lise-Marie Morerod
938	GS	1999/00	19 November 1999	(France) Régine Cavagnoud	(Italy) Karen Putzer	(Austria) Michaela Dorfmeister
939	SL	1999/00	20 November 1999	(France) Christel Pascal (Slovenia) Špela Pretnar		(Norway) Trine Bakke
1012	GS	2001/02	21 November 2001	(Norway) Andrine Flemmen	(Canada) Allison Forsyth	(Switzerland) Sonja Nef
1013	SL	2001/02	22 November 2001	(France) Laure Pequegnot	(Austria) Christine Sponring	(Austria) Carina Raich
1849	GS	2025/26	29 November 2025	(New Zealand) Alice Robinson	(Austria) Julia Scheib	(Norway) Thea Louise Stjernesund
1850	SL	2025/26	30 November 2025	(United States) Mikaela Shiffrin	(Germany) Lena Dürr	(Albania) Lara Colturi
