= 1979 Alpine Skiing World Cup – Men's giant slalom =

1979 Men's giant slalom World Cup
Previous: 1978	Next: 1980

Men's giant slalom World Cup 1978/1979

== Final point standings ==
In men's giant slalom World Cup 1978/79 the best 5 results count. Nine racers had a point deduction, which are given in brackets. Ingemar Stenmark won the cup with maximum points by winning all 10 events. He won his fifth Giant slalom World Cup in a row.

Place	Name	Country	Total points	Deduction	1 (Austria)	8 (Socialist Federal Republic of Yugoslavia)	10 (France)	15 (Switzerland)	19 (Austria)	24 (Czechoslovakia)	27 (Sweden)	30 (United States)	31 (United States)	33 (Japan)
1	Ingemar Stenmark	Sweden	125	(125)	25	25	25	25	25	(25)	(25)	(25)	(25)	(25)
2	Peter Lüscher	Switzerland	104	(41)	20	20	20	-	(20)	-	(2)	23	21	(19)
3	Bojan Križaj	Yugoslavia	96	(21)	-	15	15	(6)	-	20	-	22	24	(15)
4	Heini Hemmi	Switzerland	86	(40)	(2)	11	(8)	(11)	(11)	15	(8)	21	15	24
5	Jacques Lüthy	Switzerland	75	(2)	(1)	-	-	15	(1)	8	15	-	16	21
6	Andreas Wenzel	Liechtenstein	74		-	-	-	20	15	-	-	19	20	-
	Piero Gros	Italy	74	(5)	8	8	-	(4)	-	(1)	-	16	22	20
8	Jean-Luc Fournier	Switzerland	73	(10)	11	(2)	11	(8)	-	-	-	18	10	23
9	Hans Enn	Austria	70		-	-	-	-	3	-	4	24	23	16
10	Leonhard Stock	Austria	69	(5)	-	-	(3)	-	8	(2)	11	20	13	17
11	Boris Strel	Yugoslavia	54		-	-	-	-	-	4	-	9	19	22
12	Alex Giorgi	Italy	40		-	-	-	3	-	-	-	13	14	10
13	Jože Kuralt	Yugoslavia	35		-	-	-	-	-	-	-	17	-	18
14	Anton Steiner	Austria	33		-	-	-	1	-	-	-	15	17	-
15	Leonardo David	Italy	29		15	-	-	2	2	6	4	-	-	-
	Bohumír Zeman	Czechoslovakia	29		3	1	-	-	-	-	-	3	11	11
17	Torsten Jakobsson	Sweden	28		-	-	-	-	-	-	-	12	12	4
18	Phil Mahre	United States	27		-	-	1	-	6	-	20	-	-	-
	Wolfram Ortner	Austria	27		4	-	6	-	-	11	-	-	6	-
20	Gustav Thöni	Italy	26		-	4	-	-	-	-	-	9	-	13
21	Steve Mahre	United States	25		-	-	-	-	-	-	-	9	4	12
	Klaus Heidegger	Austria	25	(1)	-	-	4	-	4	3	(1)	-	5	9
	Werner Rhyner	Switzerland	25		-	-	-	-	-	-	6	10	7	2
24	Hannes Spiss	Austria	22		-	-	-	-	-	-	-	14	-	8
25	Franz Gruber	Austria	19		-	-	-	-	-	-	-	11	8	-
26	Ingvar Bergstedt	Sweden	18		-	-	-	-	-	-	-	-	18	-
	Pete Patterson	United States	18		-	-	-	-	-	-	-	4	-	14
28	Mauro Bernardi	Italy	9		6	3	-	-	-	-	-	-	-	-
	Eric Wilson	United States	9		-	-	-	-	-	-	-	-	9	-
30	Albert Burger	West Germany	8		-	-	2	-	-	-	-	6	-	-
	Valeri Tsyganov	Soviet Union	8		-	-	-	-	-	-	-	-	2	6
32	Willi Frommelt	Liechtenstein	7		-	-	-	-	-	-	-	-	-	7
33	Christian Orlainsky	Austria	6		-	6	-	-	-	-	-	-	-	-
34	Petar Popangelov	Bulgaria	5		-	-	-	-	-	-	-	5	-	-
	Peter Mally	Italy	5		-	-	-	-	-	-	-	-	-	5
36	Germaine Barrette	Canada	3		-	-	-	-	-	-	-	-	3	-
	Atsushi Sawada	Japan	3		-	-	-	-	-	-	-	-	-	3
38	Cary Adgate	Canada	2		-	-	-	-	-	-	-	2	-	-
	Peter Müller	Switzerland	2		-	-	-	-	-	-	-	1	-	1
40	Scott Hoffman	United States	1		-	-	-	-	-	-	-	-	1	-

Alpine Skiing World Cup
Men

Overall | Downhill | Giant slalom | Slalom | Combined

1979
