= Crazy Canucks =

Group of World Cup alpine ski racers

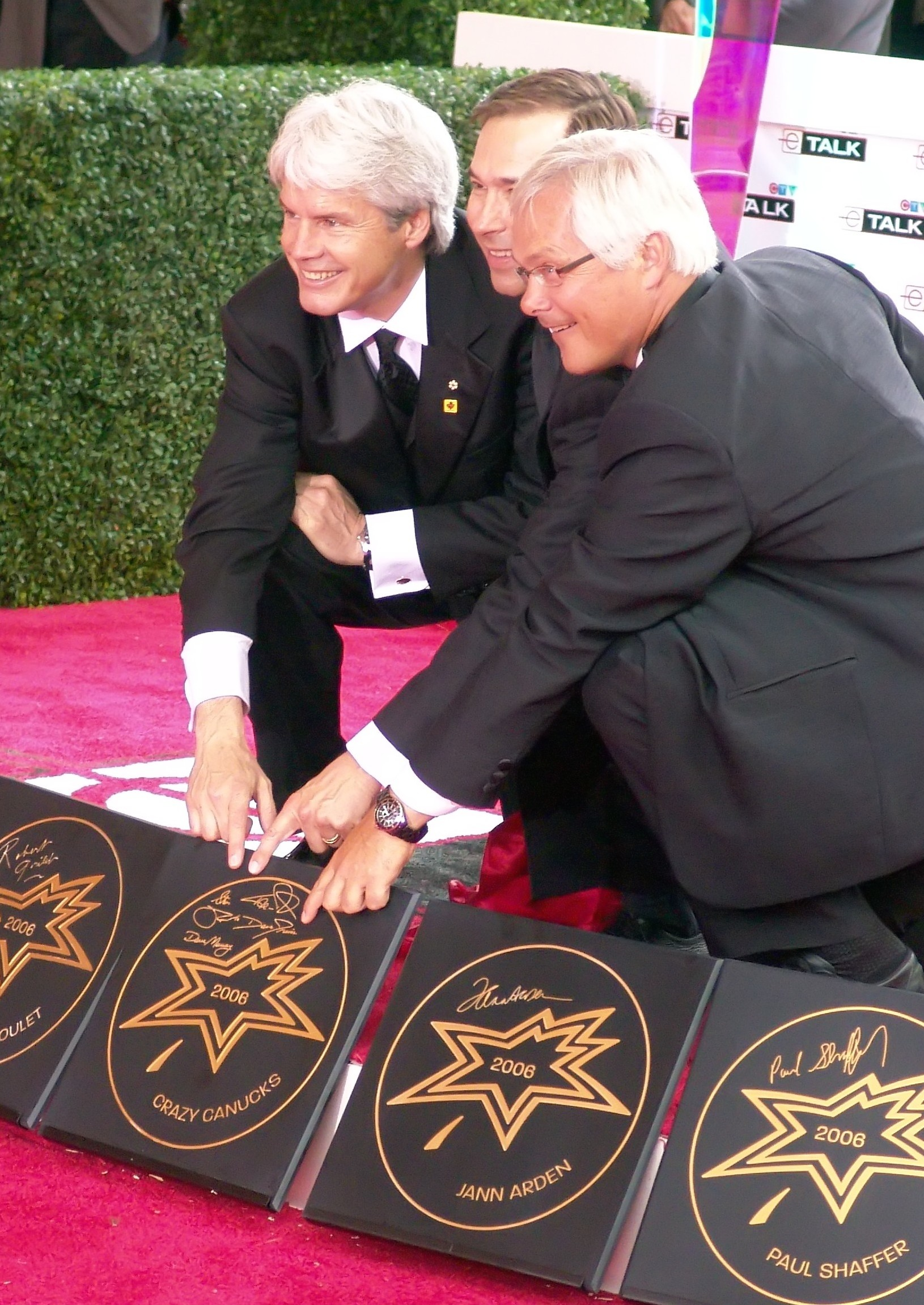
Three Crazy Canucks at the 2006 Canada's Walk of Fame ceremony (Read, Podborski, Irwin)

The Crazy Canucks was the nickname for a group of World Cup alpine ski racers from Canada who rose to prominence in the 1970s and 1980s. Jungle Jim Hunter, Dave Irwin, Dave Murray, Steve Podborski, and Ken Read earned themselves a reputation for fast and seemingly reckless skiing in the downhill event.

== History ==
These five men earned their title "Crazy Canucks" from ski journalist and World Cup co-founder Serge Lange, who after watching their different styles came up with the name that caught on with sports journalists throughout the skiing world. Other similar nicknames included "Kamikaze Canadians."

The five were better known in Europe than in North America. They consistently challenged the Europeans on the World Cup circuit at a level previously unseen, including in the most famous and prized races such as the Hahnenkamm and the Lauberhorn. From 1980-83, the Crazy Canucks astonished the ski racing world by winning the Hahnenkamm, considered the world’s most dangerous downhill course, for four straight years. The fourth victory in that streak came from Todd Brooker, a later addition to the original five.

Canadian Corner is a section of the Lauberhorn downhill course near Wengen, Switzerland. The heavily twisting curve at the left-hand transition to the Alpweg is named after the Crazy Canucks, Dave Irwin and Ken Read, who fell there in 1976.

Four of the five original Crazy Canucks live on today; Murray died of skin cancer in 1990 at age 37. The downhill course at Whistler Creekside, utilized for World Cup and Olympic races, was named for him.

In 2006, it was announced that the four original Crazy Canucks would receive stars on Canada's Walk of Fame, inducted as one group. The only other ski racer on the walk is Canadian alpine legend Nancy Greene.

== TV film ==
Crazy Canucks was a TV movie named after and based on the history of the team. It was released in 2004 in Canada. The film was directed by Randy Bradshaw and starred Sandy Robson (Hunter), Lucas Bryant (Read), Curtis Harrison (Podborski), Kyle Labine (Murray) and Robert Tinkler (Irwin).

== See also ==
- Erik Read
- Jeffrey Read
- Julia Murray
