= Klaus Eberhard =

Klaus Eberhard may refer to:

- Klaus Eberhard (skier) (born 1956), Austrian alpine skier
- Klaus Eberhard (tennis) (born 1957), West German tennis player
