= 1975–76 FIS Alpine Ski World Cup =

International sports competition

FIS Alpine Ski World Cup 1975/76
Discipline	Men	Women
Overall	(Sweden) Ingemar Stenmark	(West Germany) Rosi Mittermaier
Downhill	(Austria) Franz Klammer	(Austria) Brigitte Totschnig
Giant slalom	(Sweden) Ingemar Stenmark	(Switzerland) Lise-Marie Morerod
Slalom	(Sweden) Ingemar Stenmark	(West Germany) Rosi Mittermaier
Combined	(Switzerland) Walter Tresch	(West Germany) Rosi Mittermaier
Nations Cup	Italy	Austria
- Nations Cup overall: Austria

Competition
Locations	13	12
Individual	25	26

The 10th World Cup season began in December 1975 in France and concluded in March 1976 in Canada. Ingemar Stenmark of Sweden won the first of his three consecutive overall titles. Defending women's overall champion Annemarie Moser-Pröll, who had won five straight overall titles, missed the entire season so that she could care for her father, who was terminally ill with lung cancer. In her absence, Rosi Mittermaier of West Germany, a double gold medalist at the 1976 Winter Olympics, won the women's overall title.

This was also the first year that a season champion was recognized in the Combined discipline, which was added the previous year. After this year, the World Cup would not award a season championship trophy in Combined again until 1980. Additionally, individual parallel slalom was made a permanent fixture at the season-ending Nations Cup championships; however, it only counted for the team competition. After 1992, it was replaced by a team parallel slalom event, which again only counted for the Nations Cup team competition.

A break in the schedule in February was for the 1976 Winter Olympics in Innsbruck, Austria.

== Calendar ==
=== Men ===
Event key: DH – Downhill, SL – Slalom, GS – Giant slalom, KB – Combined, PS – Parallel slalom (Nations Cup ranking only)
Race	Season	Date	Place	Type	Winner	Second	Third
205	1	5 December 1975	(France) Val d'Isère	GS _{068}	(Italy) Gustav Thöni	(Sweden) Ingemar Stenmark	(Italy) Piero Gros
206	2	7 December 1975	(France) Val d'Isère	DH _{061}	(Canada) Ken Read	(Italy) Herbert Plank	(Switzerland) Bernhard Russi
207	3	12 December 1975	(Italy) Madonna di Campiglio	DH _{062}	(Austria) Franz Klammer	(Switzerland) Philippe Roux	(Norway) Erik Håker
208	4	14 December 1975	(Italy) Madonna di Campiglio	GS _{069}	(Switzerland) Engelhard Pargatzi	(Switzerland) Ernst Good	(Italy) Piero Gros
209	5	15 December 1975	(Italy) Vipiteno	SL _{074}	(Sweden) Ingemar Stenmark	(Austria) Hansi Hinterseer	(Italy) Piero Gros
210	6	20 December 1975	(Austria) Schladming	DH _{063}	(Canada) Dave Irwin	(Austria) Klaus Eberhard	(Italy) Herbert Plank
211	7	21 December 1975	(Austria) Schladming	SL _{075}	(Austria) Hansi Hinterseer	(Sweden) Ingemar Stenmark	(Italy) Piero Gros
212	8	5 January 1976	(West Germany) Garmisch	SL _{076}	(Italy) Fausto Radici	(Italy) Piero Gros	(Sweden) Ingemar Stenmark
213	9	9 January 1976	(Switzerland) Wengen	DH _{064}	(Italy) Herbert Plank	(Austria) Franz Klammer	(Switzerland) Bernhard Russi
214	10	5 January 1976; 9 January 1976	(West Germany) Garmisch (SL) (Switzerland) Wengen (DH)	KB _{004}	(Switzerland) Walter Tresch	(Italy) Piero Gros	(Italy) Gustav Thöni
215	11	10 January 1976	(Switzerland) Wengen	DH _{065}	(Austria) Franz Klammer	(Switzerland) Philippe Roux	(Canada) Jim Hunter
216	12	11 January 1976	(Switzerland) Wengen	SL _{077}	(Sweden) Ingemar Stenmark	(Italy) Piero Gros	(West Germany) Christian Neureuther
217	13	11 January 1976	(Switzerland) Wengen	KB _{005}	(Austria) Franz Klammer	(Italy) Gustav Thöni	(Switzerland) Walter Tresch
218	14	12 January 1976	(Switzerland) Adelboden	GS _{070}	(Italy) Gustav Thöni	(Sweden) Ingemar Stenmark	(Switzerland) Engelhard Pargatzi
219	15	17 January 1976	(France) Morzine	DH _{066}	(Austria) Franz Klammer	(Switzerland) Bernhard Russi	(Austria) Anton Steiner
220	16	18 January 1976	(France) Morzine	GS _{071}	(Italy) Franco Bieler	(Italy) Piero Gros	(Sweden) Ingemar Stenmark
221	17	24 January 1976	(Austria) Kitzbühel	SL _{078}	(Sweden) Ingemar Stenmark	(Italy) Gustav Thöni	(Italy) Piero Gros
222	18	25 January 1976	(Austria) Kitzbühel	DH _{067}	(Austria) Franz Klammer	(Norway) Erik Håker	(Austria) Josef Walcher
223	19	25 January 1976	(Austria) Kitzbühel	KB _{006}	(Switzerland) Walter Tresch	(Canada) Jim Hunter	(Italy) Gustav Thöni
224	20	27 January 1976	(West Germany) Zwiesel	GS _{072}	(Sweden) Ingemar Stenmark	(Italy) Gustav Thöni	(Austria) Hansi Hinterseer
1976 Winter Olympics (5–14 February)
225	21	5 March 1976	(United States) Copper Mountain	GS _{073}	(United States) Greg Jones	(United States) Phil Mahre	(Switzerland) Engelhard Pargatzi
226	22	7 March 1976	(United States) Copper Mountain	SL _{079}	(Sweden) Ingemar Stenmark	(United States) Steve Mahre	(Italy) Gustav Thöni
227	23	12 March 1976	(United States) Aspen	DH _{068}	(Austria) Franz Klammer	(Switzerland) René Berthod	(Austria) Ernst Winkler
228	24	14 March 1976	(United States) Aspen	SL _{080}	(Sweden) Ingemar Stenmark	(United States) Phil Mahre	(Italy) Gustav Thöni
229	25	18 March 1976	(Canada) Mt. St. Anne	GS _{074}	(Switzerland) Heini Hemmi	(Italy) Piero Gros	(Switzerland) Ernst Good
Nations Cup		20 March 1976	(Canada) Mt. St. Anne	PS _{ncr}	(Italy) Franco Bieler	(Sweden) Ingemar Stenmark	(Canada) Jim Hunter

=== Ladies ===
Event key: DH – Downhill, SL – Slalom, GS – Giant slalom, KB – Combined, PS – Parallel slalom (Nations Cup ranking only)
Race	Season	Date	Place	Type	Winner	Second	Third
198	1	3 December 1975	(France) Val d'Isère	DH _{054}	(Switzerland) Bernadette Zurbriggen	(West Germany) Irene Epple	(Switzerland) Marie-Theres Nadig
199	2	4 December 1975	(France) Val d'Isère	GS _{066}	(Switzerland) Lise-Marie Morerod	(West Germany) Rosi Mittermaier	(Austria) Monika Kaserer
200	3	10 December 1975	(Italy) Aprica	DH _{055}	(Austria) Brigitte Totschnig	(Austria) Elfi Deufl	(United States) Cindy Nelson
201	4	11 December 1975	(Italy) Aprica	SL _{076}	(Switzerland) Lise-Marie Morerod	(West Germany) Rosi Mittermaier	(Italy) Claudia Giordani
202	5	16 December 1975	(Italy) Cortina d'Ampezzo	DH _{056}	(West Germany) Evi Mittermaier	(Austria) Brigitte Totschnig	(Switzerland) Bernadette Zurbriggen
203	6	17 December 1975	(Italy) Cortina d'Ampezzo	SL _{077}	(France) Fabienne Serrat	(West Germany) Pamela Behr	(West Germany) Rosi Mittermaier
204	7	17 December 1975	(Italy) Cortina d'Ampezzo	KB _{004}	(West Germany) Rosi Mittermaier	(Austria) Brigitte Totschnig	(Switzerland) Bernadette Zurbriggen
205	8	7 January 1976	(Switzerland) Meiringen	DH _{057}	(Austria) Brigitte Totschnig	(Austria) Nicola Spieß	(Austria) Irmgard Lukasser
206	9	8 January 1976	(Switzerland) Meiringen	DH _{058}	(Switzerland) Bernadette Zurbriggen	(Austria) Irmgard Lukasser	(Austria) Nicola Spieß
207	10	9 January 1976	(Switzerland) Meiringen	GS _{067}	(Austria) Monika Kaserer	(France) Danièle Debernard	(Switzerland) Marie-Theres Nadig
208	11	9 January 1976	(Switzerland) Meiringen	KB _{005}	(United States) Cindy Nelson	(West Germany) Rosi Mittermaier	(Liechtenstein) Hanni Wenzel
209	12	12 January 1976	(Switzerland) Les Diablerets	SL _{078}	(Switzerland) Lise-Marie Morerod	(West Germany) Rosi Mittermaier	(France) Patricia Emonet
210	13	14 January 1976	(France) Les Gets	SL _{079}	(France) Danièle Debernard	(West Germany) Monika Berwein	(France) Patricia Emonet
211	14	15 January 1976	(France) Les Gets	GS _{068}	(Switzerland) Lise-Marie Morerod	(West Germany) Rosi Mittermaier	(Austria) Monika Kaserer
212	15	17 January 1976	(West Germany) Berchtesgaden	SL _{080}	(West Germany) Christa Zechmeister	(France) Danièle Debernard	(Liechtenstein) Hanni Wenzel
213	16	18 January 1976	(West Germany) Berchtesgaden	GS _{069}	(France) Danièle Debernard	(Switzerland) Lise-Marie Morerod	(Austria) Monika Kaserer
	17	21 January 1976	(Austria) Bad Gastein	DH	(Switzerland) Doris de Agostini	(Switzerland) Marlies Oberholzer	(Austria) Elfi Deufl
215	18	22 January 1976	(Austria) Bad Gastein	SL _{081}	(West Germany) Rosi Mittermaier	(Italy) Claudia Giordani	(United States) Cindy Nelson
216	19	22 January 1976	(Austria) Bad Gastein	KB _{006}	(Switzerland) Bernadette Zurbriggen	(Austria) Monika Kaserer	(Canada) Betsy Clifford
217	20	25 January 1976	(Socialist Federal Republic of Yugoslavia) Kranjska Gora	GS _{070}	(Switzerland) Lise-Marie Morerod	(West Germany) Rosi Mittermaier	(Switzerland) Bernadette Zurbriggen
218	21	26 January 1976	(Socialist Federal Republic of Yugoslavia) Kranjska Gora	SL _{082}	(Switzerland) Lise-Marie Morerod	(West Germany) Rosi Mittermaier	(Austria) Regina Sackl
1976 Winter Olympics (5–14 February)
219	22	5 March 1976	(United States) Copper Mountain	GS _{071}	(West Germany) Rosi Mittermaier	(United States) Cindy Nelson	(Switzerland) Bernadette Zurbriggen
220	23	6 March 1976	(United States) Copper Mountain	SL _{083}	(West Germany) Rosi Mittermaier	(Austria) Monika Kaserer	(Switzerland) Lise-Marie Morerod
221	24	12 March 1976	(United States) Aspen	DH _{060}	(Austria) Brigitte Totschnig	(France) Danièle Debernard	(West Germany) Rosi Mittermaier
222	25	13 March 1976	(United States) Aspen	GS _{072}	(Switzerland) Lise-Marie Morerod	(France) Danièle Debernard	(Austria) Monika Kaserer
223	26	19 March 1976	(Canada) Mt. St. Anne	GS _{073}	(Austria) Monika Kaserer	(France) Fabienne Serrat	(Canada) Kathy Kreiner
Nations Cup		20 March 1976	(Canada) Mt. St. Anne	PS _{ncr}	(Switzerland) Bernadette Zurbriggen	(West Germany) Irene Epple	(Austria) Monika Kaserer

== Men ==
=== Overall ===
The Men's overall World Cup 1975/76 was divided into two periods. From the first 14 races the best 8 results count and from the last 11 races the best 6 results count. In this season only Piero Gros has a point deduction! Only the 4 points for his 7th place in the giant slalom in Copper Mountain were deducted.

Place	Name	Country	Total
1	Ingemar Stenmark	Sweden	249
2	Piero Gros	Italy	205
3	Gustav Thöni	Italy	190
4	Franz Klammer	Austria	181
5	Hansi Hinterseer	Austria	98
	Walter Tresch	Switzerland	98
7	Herbert Plank	Italy	77
8	Bernhard Russi	Switzerland	72
9	Philippe Roux	Switzerland	71
10	Engelhard Pargätzi	Switzerland	67
11	Franco Bieler	Italy	63
12	Ernst Good	Switzerland	59
13	Jim Hunter	Canada	58
14	Fausto Radici	Italy	55
	Phil Mahre	United States	55

=== Downhill ===
In men's downhill World Cup 1975/76 the best 5 results count. Three racers had a point deduction, which are given in (). Franz Klammer won 5 races and won the cup with maximum points. He won 4 downhill races in a row. Together with the first 5 downhill races in the next season 1976/77, he won 9 downhill races in a row!!

Place	Name	Country	Total	2	3	6	9	11	15	18	23
1	Franz Klammer	Austria	125	-	25	(11)	(20)	25	25	25	25
2	Herbert Plank	Italy	77	20	-	15	25	11	-	-	6
3	Bernhard Russi	Switzerland	66	15	(6)	8	15	-	20	8	-
4	Philippe Roux	Switzerland	63	6	20	6	11	20	(6)	(2)	-
5	Dave Irwin	Canada	47	11	11	25	-	-	-	-	-
6	Klaus Eberhard	Austria	41	-	2	20	2	-	11	6	-
7	Werner Grissmann	Austria	39	8	8	-	4	-	8	11	-
8	Erik Håker	Norway	35	-	15	-	-	-	-	20	-
9	Ken Read	Canada	28	25	-	-	-	-	-	-	3
10	Jim Hunter	Canada	27	2	-	-	6	15	-	4	-

=== Giant slalom ===
In men's giant slalom World Cup 1975/76 the best 5 results count. Two racers had a point deduction, which are given in (). Ingemar Stenmark won the cup with only 1 win. In 7 races there were 6 different winners.

Place	Name	Country	Total	1	4	14	16	20	21	25
1	Ingemar Stenmark	Sweden	88	20	(1)	20	15	25	-	8
2	Gustav Thöni	Italy	82	25	4	25	8	20	-	-
3	Piero Gros	Italy	78	15	15	-	20	8	(4)	20
4	Engelhard Pargätzi	Switzerland	67	-	25	15	1	11	15	-
5	Ernst Good	Switzerland	56	8	20	2	-	-	11	15
6	Greg Jones	United States	44	-	-	8	-	-	25	11
7	Franco Bieler	Italy	43	4	11	-	25	3	-	-
8	Hansi Hinterseer	Austria	40	2	-	11	11	15	1	-
9	Heini Hemmi	Switzerland	39	-	-	4	4	6	-	25
10	Phil Mahre	United States	29	6	-	3	-	-	20	-

=== Slalom ===
In men's slalom World Cup 1975/76 the best 5 results count. Two racers had a point deduction, which are given in (). Ingemar Stenmark won 5 races and won the cup with maximum points. He won 4 slalom races in a row.

Place	Name	Country	Total	5	7	8	12	17	22	24
1	Ingemar Stenmark	Sweden	125	25	(20)	(15)	25	25	25	25
2	Piero Gros	Italy	85	15	15	20	20	15	(11)	(11)
3	Hansi Hinterseer	Austria	58	20	25	-	11	-	2	-
	Gustav Thöni	Italy	58	2	-	-	6	20	15	15
5	Fausto Radici	Italy	52	11	8	25	-	-	8	-
6	Christian Neureuther	West Germany	30	-	11	4	15	-	-	-
7	Phil Mahre	United States	26	-	-	-	-	6	-	20
8	Steve Mahre	United States	20	-	-	-	-	-	20	-
	Franco Bieler	Italy	20	-	-	-	8	11	1	-
10	Walter Tresch	Switzerland	17	-	6	11	-	-	-	-

=== Combined ===
In men's Combined World Cup 1975/76 all results count. This was the first ever Combined World Cup.

Place	Name	Country	Total	10	13	19
1	Walter Tresch	Switzerland	65	25	15	25
2	Gustav Thöni	Italy	50	15	20	15
3	Jim Hunter	Canada	29	8	1	20
4	Franz Klammer	Austria	25	-	25	-
5	Anton Steiner	Austria	22	-	11	11
6	Piero Gros	Italy	20	20	-	-
7	Erwin Stricker	Italy	12	-	8	4
8	Peter Lüscher	Switzerland	11	11	-	-
9	Pete Patterson	United States	8	-	-	8
10	Sepp Ferstl	West Germany	6	6	-	-
	Steve Podborski	Canada	6	-	6	-
	Bohumír Zeman	Czechoslovakia	6	4	2	-
	Ken Read	Canada	6	-	-	6

== Ladies ==
=== Overall ===
The Women's overall World Cup 1975/76 was divided into two periods. From the first 14 races the best 8 results count and from the last 12 races the best 6 results count. Four racers had a point deduction.

Place	Name	Country	Total
1	Rosi Mittermaier	West Germany	281
2	Lise-Marie Morerod	Switzerland	214
3	Monika Kaserer	Austria	171
4	Bernadette Zurbriggen	Switzerland	170
5	Danièle Debernard	France	165
6	Brigitte Totschnig	Austria	155
7	Fabienne Serrat	France	125
8	Cindy Nelson	United States	122
9	Hanni Wenzel	Liechtenstein	83
10	Irene Epple	West Germany	73
11	Claudia Giordani	Italy	67
12	Irmgard Lukasser	Austria	62
	Nicola Spieß	Austria	62
14	Marie-Theres Nadig	Switzerland	58
	Patricia Emonet	France	58

=== Downhill ===
In women's downhill World Cup 1975/76 the best 5 results count. Two racers had a point deduction, which are given in ().

Place	Name	Country	Total	1	3	5	8	9	17	24
1	Brigitte Totschnig	Austria	106	11	25	20	25	-	-	25
2	Bernadette Zurbriggen	Switzerland	87	25	11	15	11	25	(4)	(2)
3	Nicola Spieß	Austria	52	3	8	-	20	15	-	6
4	Irmgard Lukasser	Austria	45	8	-	2	15	20	-	-
5	Elfi Deufl	Austria	44	1	20	6	2	-	15	-
6	Irene Epple	West Germany	42	20	6	8	6	2	-	-
7	Cindy Nelson	United States	37	6	15	1	(1)	4	-	11
8	Evi Mittermaier	West Germany	32	-	-	25	3	-	-	4
9	Rosi Mittermaier	West Germany	30	-	1	3	-	11	-	15
10	Marie-Theres Nadig	Switzerland	27	15	-	-	-	-	11	1

=== Giant slalom ===
In women's giant slalom World Cup 1975/76 the best 5 results count. Four racers had a point deduction, which are given in ().

Place	Name	Country	Total	2	10	14	16	20	22	25	26
1	Lise-Marie Morerod	Switzerland	120	25	-	25	20	25	(4)	25	(4)
2	Monika Kaserer	Austria	95	15	25	15	15	-	(1)	(15)	25
3	Rosi Mittermaier	West Germany	91	20	(4)	20	6	20	25	-	-
4	Danièle Debernard	France	82	-	20	11	25	6	-	20	-
5	Fabienne Serrat	France	51	8	-	4	8	11	-	(1)	20
6	Cindy Nelson	United States	35	-	11	-	-	-	20	4	-
7	Bernadette Zurbriggen	Switzerland	30	-	-	-	-	15	15	-	-
8	Kathy Kreiner	Canada	28	-	2	-	-	-	-	11	15
9	Brigitte Totschnig	Austria	23	3	-	8	-	1	11	-	-
10	Marie-Theres Nadig	Switzerland	19	-	15	-	4	-	-	-	-

=== Slalom ===
In women's slalom World Cup 1975/76 the best 5 results count. Three racers had a point deduction, which are given in ().

Place	Name	Country	Total	4	6	12	13	15	18	21	23
1	Rosi Mittermaier	West Germany	110	20	(15)	20	-	(2)	25	20	25
2	Lise-Marie Morerod	Switzerland	90	25	-	25	-	-	-	25	15
3	Danièle Debernard	France	65	8	-	(2)	25	20	6	6	-
4	Fabienne Serrat	France	61	11	25	11	6	-	(4)	8	-
5	Claudia Giordani	Italy	52	15	-	6	-	11	20	-	-
6	Pamela Behr	West Germany	51	-	20	-	-	6	11	3	11
7	Christa Zechmeister	West Germany	47	-	-	-	3	25	2	11	6
8	Patricia Emonet	France	46	-	8	15	15	-	8	-	-
9	Hanni Wenzel	Liechtenstein	34	-	4	3	-	15	-	4	8
10	Monika Kaserer	Austria	25	-	-	-	-	-	3	2	20

=== Combined ===
In women's Combined World Cup 1975/76 all results count. This was the first ever Combined World Cup!

Place	Name	Country	Total	7	11	19
1	Rosi Mittermaier	West Germany	45	25	20	-
2	Bernadette Zurbriggen	Switzerland	43	15	3	25
3	Cindy Nelson	United States	31	6	25	-
4	Brigitte Totschnig	Austria	26	20	-	6
5	Monika Kaserer	Austria	24	-	4	20
6	Hanni Wenzel	Liechtenstein	18	3	15	-
7	Irmgard Lukasser	Austria	17	11	6	-
8	Betsy Clifford	Canada	15	-	-	15
9	Irene Epple	West Germany	11	-	11	-
	Lea Sölkner	Austria	11	-	-	11

== Nations Cup ==
=== Overall ===
Place	Country	Total	Men	Ladies
1	Austria	1114	523	591
2	Switzerland	960	464	496
3	Italy	744	653	91
4	West Germany	642	93	549
5	France	382	10	372
6	United States	359	151	208
7	Sweden	251	251	0
8	Canada	223	165	58
9	Liechtenstein	88	5	83
10	Norway	46	46	0
11	Iran	21	0	21
12	Czechoslovakia	17	9	8
13	Japan	4	4	0
14	Poland	3	3	0
15	Spain	1	1	0

=== Men ===
Place	Country	Total	DH	GS	SL	KB	Racers	Wins
1	Italy	653	77	219	275	82	11	5
2	Austria	523	311	77	85	50	13	7
3	Switzerland	464	188	174	26	76	11	4
4	Sweden	251	0	89	162	0	2	6
5	Canada	165	118	2	0	45	5	2
6	United States	151	0	85	56	10	6	1
7	West Germany	93	25	15	38	15	7	0
8	Norway	46	35	0	11	0	2	0
9	France	10	7	2	1	0	3	0
10	Czechoslovakia	9	0	2	1	6	2	0
11	Liechtenstein	5	0	0	5	0	2	0
12	Japan	4	0	0	4	0	1	0
13	Poland	3	0	0	3	0	1	0
14	Spain	1	0	0	0	1	1	0

=== Ladies ===
Place	Country	Total	DH	GS	SL	KB	Racers	Wins
1	Austria	591	297	150	45	99	13	5
2	West Germany	549	104	130	259	56	7	6
3	Switzerland	496	165	177	106	48	6	11
4	France	372	24	159	179	10	5	3
5	United States	208	49	81	46	32	8	1
6	Italy	91	8	18	62	3	4	0
7	Liechtenstein	83	16	15	34	18	1	0
8	Canada	58	5	29	9	15	2	0
9	Iran	21	0	5	12	4	1	0
10	Czechoslovakia	8	0	0	8	0	2	0
