= Dave Irwin =

Canadian alpine skier (born 1954)

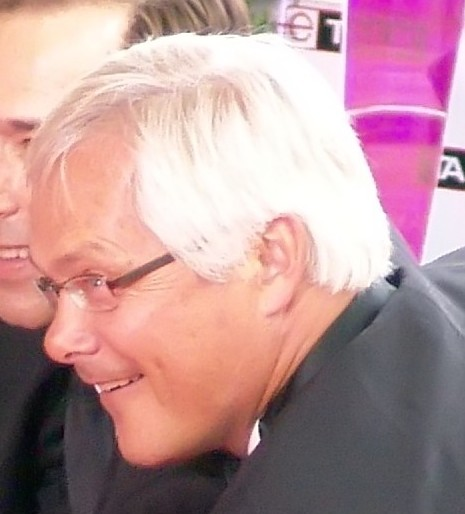
- Dave Irwin at the 2006 Canada's Walk of Fame ceremony

Personal information
- Born: July 12, 1954 (age 72) Thunder Bay, Ontario, Canada

Skiing career
- Sport: Alpine skiing
- Retired: March, 1982
- World Cup debut: December 22, 1973

Olympics
- Teams: 2

World Cup
- Seasons: 8
- Wins: 1
- Podiums: 2

Dave Irwin (born July 12, 1954) is a former alpine ski racer who represented Canada at two Winter Olympic Games and won a World Cup downhill. He was one of the "Crazy Canucks", a group of Canadian downhill racers who rose to prominence on the World Cup circuit in the late 1970s. He lives in Canmore, Alberta, near the Rocky Mountains.

== Biography ==
Dave Irwin was born in Thunder Bay, Ontario, Canada where he learned to ski at the age of three at his father's ski resort. By the age of 17, Irwin had been selected to be a member of the Canadian National Ski Team. Originally picked for his ability as a slalom skier, he successfully switched to downhill when national team coach Scotty Henderson reoriented the squad and the team's resources towards the speed event.

Irwin's first World Cup race was the downhill at Schladming, Austria on December 22, 1973 where he placed 14th. Two years later at Schladming, he won the downhill event in a time of 2:00.84 beating the second-place finisher, Klaus Eberhard by almost two seconds. Irwin reached the podium again in 1982 with a third-place finish at the World Cup downhill in Whistler, B.C. behind winner Peter Müller, and team mate Steve Podborski.

Irwin represented Canada at two Winter Olympic Games. At the 1976 Winter Olympics in Innsbruck, Austria, Irwin finished eighth. At the 1980 Winter Olympics in Lake Placid, USA, he placed eleventh.

== Traumatic brain injury ==
Iriwn sustained two severe concussions during his racing career, once before the 1976, Olympics, and a second concussion before the 1980 Olympics. The first concussion was sustained on January 10, 1976 at the downhill race in Wengen, Switzerland — two weeks after his sole World Cup win at Schladming — and resulted in five days in hospital. Less than two weeks later, Irwin was back training with the ski team. Canadian Corner a Section of the Lauberhorn near Wengen in Switzerland. The heavily twisting curve at the left-hand transition to the Alpweg is named after the Crazy Canucks, Ken Read and Dave Irwin who both fell there in 1976.

Irwin suffered a traumatic brain injury on a training run for an Export A Skier-Cross event on March 23, 2001 which put him in a coma for three days. He recovered slowly from the injury with severe memory loss. He and his fiancée Lynne Harrison later created the Dave Irwin Foundation for Brain Injury. The foundation was dissolved in 2016.
