= The Dream Never Dies (film) =

1980 Canadian documentary film

- Directed by: William Johnston
- Produced by: William Johnston
- Starring: Ken Read
- Narrated by: Henry Ramer
- Cinematography: Armin Matter; Nicolas Stiliadis
- Edited by: Michael Jones
- Music by: Fred Mollin
- Production company: Lauron Productions
- Distributed by: Saguenay Films
- Release date: November 28, 1980
- Running time: 79 minutes
- Country: Canada
- Language: English

The Dream Never Dies is a Canadian documentary film, directed by William Johnston and released in 1980. The film is a profile of Canadian downhill skier Ken Read, and his quest to win the gold medal in the 1979–80 FIS Alpine Ski World Cup.

The film received a Genie Award nomination for Best Feature Length Documentary at the 2nd Genie Awards in 1981.
