= Hans Hinterholzer =

Austrian alpine skier (1923–2018)

Personal information
- Nationality: Austrian
- Born: 23 February 1923 Going am Wilden Kaiser, Austria
- Died: 2018 (aged 95)

Sport
- Sport: Alpine skiing

Hans Hinterholzer (23 February 1923 – 2018) was an Austrian alpine skier. He competed in the men's slalom at the 1948 Winter Olympics.
