= Knut Erik Johannessen =

Norwegian alpine skier (born 1955)

Knut Erik Johannessen (born 7 September 1955) is a Norwegian alpine skier. He was born in Oslo, and represented the club Njård IL. He competed at the 1980 Winter Olympics in Lake Placid.

He was Norwegian champion in slalom in 1977 and 1979.
