= Ken Read =

Canadian alpine skier (born 1955)

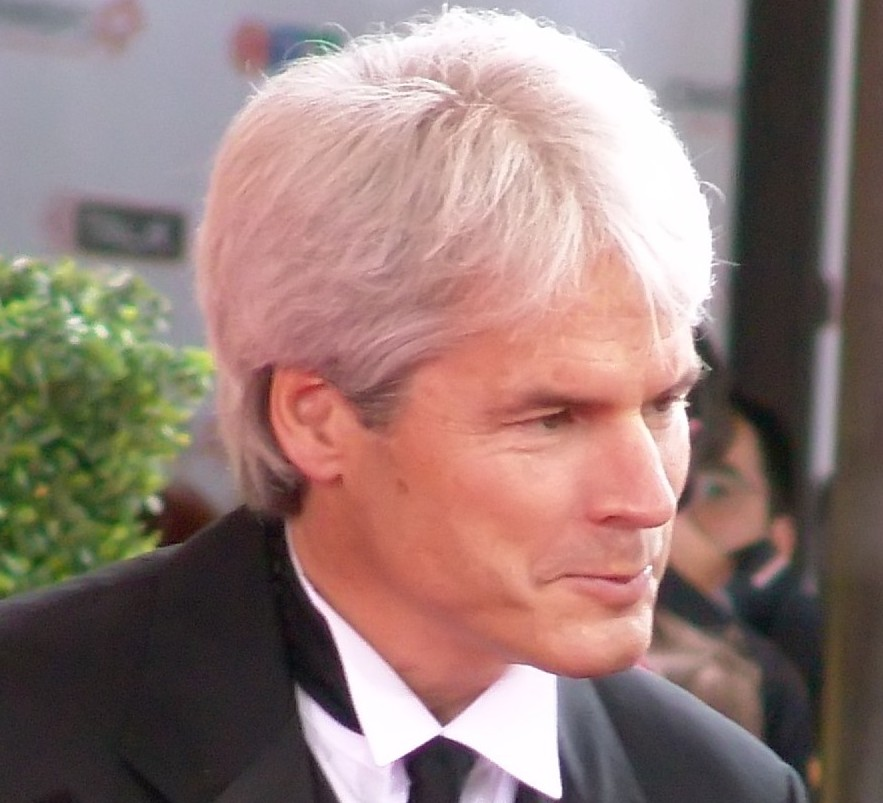
- Read in 2006 at Canada's; Walk of Fame ceremony

Personal information
- Born: November 6, 1955 (age 71)

Skiing career
- Sport: Alpine skiing
- Club: Lake Louise Ski Club
- Retired: March 1983 (age 27)
- Disciplines: Downhill, Combined
- World Cup debut: December 6, 1974 (age 19)

Olympics
- Teams: 2 – (1976, 1980)
- Medals: 0

World Championships
- Teams: 4 – (1976, '78, '80, '82) includes two Olympics
- Medals: 0

World Cup
- Seasons: 10 – (1974–1983)
- Wins: 5 – (5 DH)
- Podiums: 14 – (14 DH)
- Overall titles: 0 – (11th in 1978, 1980)
- Discipline titles: 0 – (2nd in DH, 1980)

Kenneth John Read CM (born November 6, 1955) is a former World Cup alpine ski racer from Canada. He was a specialist in the downhill and a two-time Olympian. He won five World Cup races during his ten-year international career, all in downhill.

Read grew up in Vancouver, Kingston, and Calgary, and currently resides in Canmore. He is the father of World Cup alpine racers Erik and Jeffrey Read and well known freeski athlete Kevyn Read.

== Ski racing ==
Read was a member of the Canadian alpine ski team from 1973 to 1983, competing for nine seasons on the FIS Alpine Ski World Cup. He competed in two Olympic Winter Games and two FIS Alpine World Ski Championships. A lifelong Calgary resident, Read was part of the "Crazy Canucks", the Canadian downhill team of the late 1970s and early 1980s, that consistently challenged the Europeans with a daring racing style. Canadian Corner, a section of the Lauberhorn near Wengen in Switzerland - the heavily twisting curve at the left-hand transition to the Alpweg is named after the Crazy Canucks, as both Dave Irwin and Ken Read fell here in 1976.

Read's first World Cup top ten finish came in his first season on the World Cup Tour in January 1975 in a combined event at Kitzbühel.

The following season, he achieved a Canadian first, becoming the first Canadian male to win a World Cup event in any sport - summer or winter.

On December 7, 1975, in the opening downhill of the 1975-76 World Cup Tours, he placed 1st in the Criterium de la Premiere Neige at Val-d'Isère, France. This was also a competition for North American men, as a first win in World Cup downhill. Read led four Canadians to finish in the top ten.

Read went on to win four more World Cup downhill races and his point total for the 1980 season placed him second in the downhill final standings. He was the first non-European to win both the Austrian downhill Hahnenkamm at Kitzbühel, and the Swiss race Lauberhorn at Wengen. These two victories complemented his 1978 win at Les Houches near Chamonix, France, in the Arlberg-Kandahar, ski racing's oldest classic event. Another victory in January 1979 at Morzine was disallowed because of a non-conforming suit due to a manufacturing flaw. His outstanding season in 1980 was marred by an unfortunate binding release, just fifteen seconds into the Olympic downhill where he was considered the gold-medal favourite.

== Honours ==
Read was named Canada's Athlete of the Year in 1978 (Northern Star Award, formerly the Lou Marsh Award) and Canadian Male Amateur Athlete of the Year in 1980. In 1991 he was made a Member of the Order of Canada Canada's highest civilian honour. He was inducted into Canada's Sports Hall of Fame in 1985, into Canada's Skiing Hall of Fame (Honour Roll of Canadian Skiing) in 1986, and to the International Ski Racing Hall of Fame in 2010. Along with his four teammates, the Crazy Canucks were inducted into Canada's Walk of Fame in 2006.

== After racing ==
In his post-competitive years, Read has continued to have an impact on sport in Canada and worldwide. A testament to this continued work to advance Canadian sport was recognized by The Globe and Mail naming Read to their "Power List" for three successive years in 2005, 2006 and 2007.

Following his retirement from competition in 1983, Read became a broadcaster with CBC TV Sports and a columnist. He also launched the "Breath of Life" Ski Challenge, which, over the next 23 years raised over $3.8 million for cystic fibrosis research. Two movies have been produced covering the careers of the Crazy Canucks: the documentary "The Dream Never Dies" (1980) and a TV movie called "Crazy Canucks" (2004), which is based on a novel he and Matthew Fisher wrote called "White Circus" (1987).

From June 2002 to July 2008 he served as President & CEO of Alpine Canada Alpin, the National Sport Organization for alpine and para-alpine skiing in Canada. Under his direction, the organization was transformed with athletic results (record performances in 2007 and 2008), strong financial performance and innovative strategies. Canada attained the highest ranking on the FIS World Cup from 14th (2002) to 6th (2008), fully integrated the alpine skiing disabled program (Canadian Para-Alpine Ski Team), which was ranked #1 in the world, secured the finances of the organization including a substantial reserve fund for future athlete development, created a long-range athlete development plan (Aim-2-Win) and published a long-range strategic plan. Over this six-year period, under his leadership Alpine Canada established three National Training Centres, worked closely with Winsport Canada to establish a new glacier training venue (Camp Green at Farnham Glacier), established a snow testing lab, was a key leader within the group of sports leaders than established "Own the Podium" which enabled Canadian winter sport to take top spot (by gold medal ranking) at the 2010 Olympic Winter Games (Note: Own the Podium was the phrase used by Alpine Canada in the development of their Strategic Plan in 2003 and was loaned to the founding group) and established numerous athlete development programs to create a high-performance stream for athletes at all levels.

After resigning from Alpine Canada in July 2008, he moved to the Alberta Alpine Ski Association to work with younger athletes and athlete development programs, between September 2008 and May 2010. In May 2010 Read was named Director, Winter Sport for Own The Podium (OTP), Canada's high-performance program supporting athletes and National Sport Organizations in the Olympic and Paralympic Games which he had been within the leadership group that founded the organization in 2005. He resigned in April 2013. In this period, Canadian winter sport moved into the #1 position for two years in both gold medal and total medal count, topping out with 19 gold medals and 37 total medals in 2012 as ranked by World Championship results.

Read has been an active leader of Canadian and international sport for over 50 years, initially as the founding chair of the Canadian Olympic Association Athletes Council and subsequently, a member of the International Olympic Committee (IOC) Athletes' Commission (1985–1998). He served as Chef de Mission for the 1992 Canadian Team to Barcelona, where the Canadian Team won 18 medals including a record 7 gold medals. In 1988, Read was named to the International Ski Federation's (FIS) Alpine Committee Executive Board, overseeing the discipline of alpine skiing. In 2007 he was nominated to chair the FIS Youth and Children's Coordination Group and Alpine Youth and Children's committee, to re-organize youth development programs for the International Ski Federation. This included Chairing the annual FIS Youth Seminar, attending FIS Alpine Junior World Ski Championships and codifying rules and organization for children's events world-wide. In June/2022, Read retired from all FIS committee work and was named an "Honorary Member" of both the Alpine Executive Board and the Youth and Children's committee, in recognition for exemplary work on behalf of athletes and the FIS.

Between October 2006 and July 2014, Read was a member of the ownership group of the Mount Norquay ski resort in Banff National Park. He resides in Calgary with his wife Lynda (née Robbins, a former racer with Canadian Alpine Ski Team) and three sons, all of whom competed in alpine skiing. Two are members of the Canadian Alpine Ski Team, Erik Read and Jeffrey Read. team. He is an alumnus of the Ottawa Ski Club and Lake Louise Ski Club. The Read family are members of the Banff Alpine Racers, located at Banff Mount Norquay, Alberta.

== Popular culture ==
The National Film Board produced several short films and features about the Crazy Canucks, shot during the 1975-76 season.

His World Cup season in 1979-80 was profiled in William Johnston's Genie Award-nominated documentary film The Dream Never Dies.

In the 2006 episode of Corner Gas titled "Physical Credit", Oscar meets with Ken Read to try to persuade him to create an Olympic medal category higher than gold. Read responds that the other countries would not agree to it. Oscar says the old Ken Read would have done it, the Crazy Canuck Ken Read. Read responds that he is not crazy anymore, with Oscar acknowledging it and then claiming that he is now useless.

A made for TV movie about the Crazy Canucks was produced by Randy Bradshaw of Alberta Film Works. It aired on the CTV Network in February 2010.

== World Cup results ==
=== Season standings ===
Season	Age	Overall	Slalom	Giant Slalom	Super G	Downhill	Combined
1975	19	49	—	—	not run	24	
1976	20	24	—	—	not run	9	11
1977	21	58	—	—	not run	—	not awarded
1978	22	11	—	—	not run	4	not awarded
1979	23	22	—	—	not run	4	not awarded
1980	24	11	—	—	not run	2	—
1981	25	38	—	—	not run	12	—
1982	26	17	—	—	not run	6	—
1983	27	23	—	—	w/ GS	8	26

Points were only awarded for top ten finishes (see scoring system).

=== Race podiums ===
- 5 wins (5 DH)
- 14 podiums (14 DH), 40 top tens (35 DH, 5 K)

Season	Date	Location	Discipline	Place
1976	7 Dec 1975	Val-d'Isère, France	Downhill	1st
1978	11 Feb 1978	Les Houches, France	Downhill	1st
1979	10 Dec 1978	Schladming, Austria	Downhill	1st
1979	10 Dec 1978	Val Gardena, Italy	Downhill	3rd
1979	14 Jan 1979	Crans-Montana, Switzerland	Downhill	3rd
1980	12 Jan 1980	Kitzbühel, Austria	Downhill	1st
1980	18 Jan 1980	Wengen, Switzerland	Downhill	1st
1980	19 Jan 1980	Wengen, Switzerland	Downhill	2nd
1981	7 Dec 1980	Val-d'Isère, France	Downhill	2nd
1982	21 Dec 1981	Crans-Montana, Switzerland	Downhill	3rd
1982	15 Jan 1982	Kitzbühel, Austria	Downhill	3rd
1982	16 Jan 1982	Kitzbühel, Austria	Downhill	3rd
1983	10 Jan 1983	Val-d'Isère, France	Downhill	2nd
1983	22 Jan 1983	Kitzbühel, Austria	Downhill	3rd

- A victory in 1979 on January 6 was disallowed after a protest due to a nonconforming racing suit.

== World championship results ==
Year	Age	Slalom	Giant Slalom	Super-G	Downhill	Combined
1976	20	DNF1	DNF2	not run	5	—
1978	22	—	DNF	not run	22	—
1980	24	—	—	not run	DNF	—
1982	26	—	—	not run	14	—

From 1948 through 1980, the Winter Olympics were also the World Championships for alpine skiing.

== Olympic results ==
Year	Age	Slalom	Giant Slalom	Super-G	Downhill	Combined
1976	20	DNF1	DNF2	not run	5	not run
1980	24	—	—	not run	DNF	not run

== See also ==
- Crazy Canucks
- Jeffrey Read
