= Nicola Spiess =

Austrian alpine skier

Personal information
- Born: 29 July 1958 (age 67) Innsbruck, Austria
- Height: 1973

Skiing career
- Sport: Alpine skiing
- Club: Ski-Club Mayrhofen
- Disciplines: Speed events
- World Cup debut: 1981

World Championships
- Teams: 1

World Cup
- Seasons: 9
- Podiums: 4
Medal record
Women's alpine skiing
Representing Austria
World Cup race podiums
Event	1st	2nd	3rd
Downhill	0	2	2

Nicola Spiess (married Werdenigg; born 29 July 1958) is an Austrian former alpine skier.

She is the sister of the former alpine skier Uli Spiess and is the daughter of Ernst Spiess and Erika Mahringer.

== Career ==
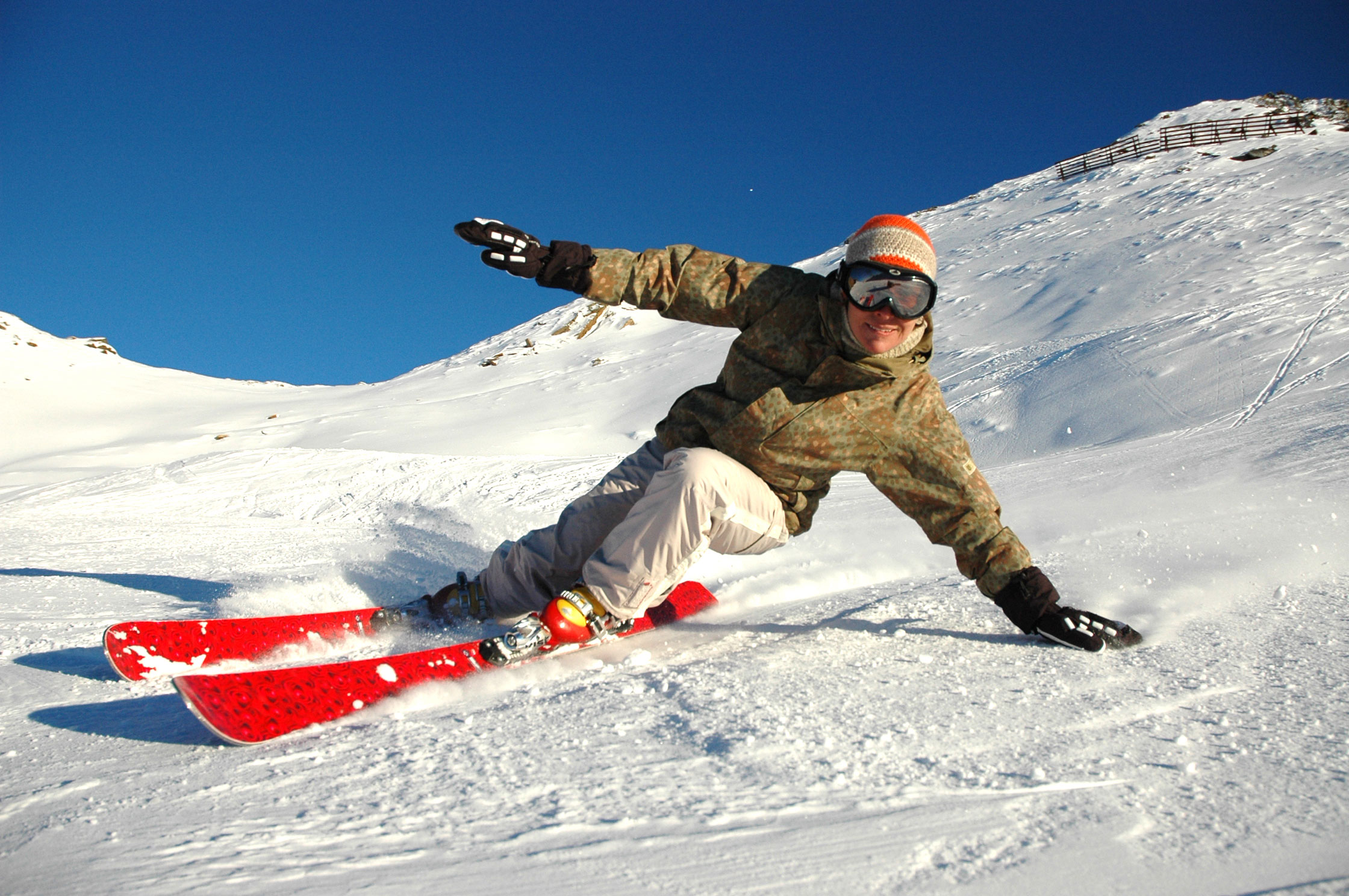
Spiess skiing in carving in 2007 at the age of 49.

During her career she has achieved 17 results among the top 10 (4 podiums) in the World Cup. She competed in the 1976 Winter Olympics and was 4th in downhill. She retired from the competitive skiing at 21.

== The denunciation of sexual abuse ==
In 2017, after the Weinstein scandal, she talked about the sexual abuse suffered by members of the Austrian Alpine Ski Team in the 1970s. She also wrote a book on the subject: Ski Macht Spiele (Ski power games).

== World Cup results ==
Podiums

Date	Place	Discipline	Rank
21 December 1976	(Austria) Zell am See	Downhill	2
20 December 1976	(Austria) Zell am See	Downhill	3
8 January 1976	(Switzerland) Meiringen	Downhill	3
7 January 1976	(Switzerland) Meiringen	Downhill	2

== National titles ==
Spiess has won one national championships at individual senior level.

- Austria Alpine Ski Championships
  - Downhill: 1975
