= Elfi Deufl =

Austrian skier (1958–2025)

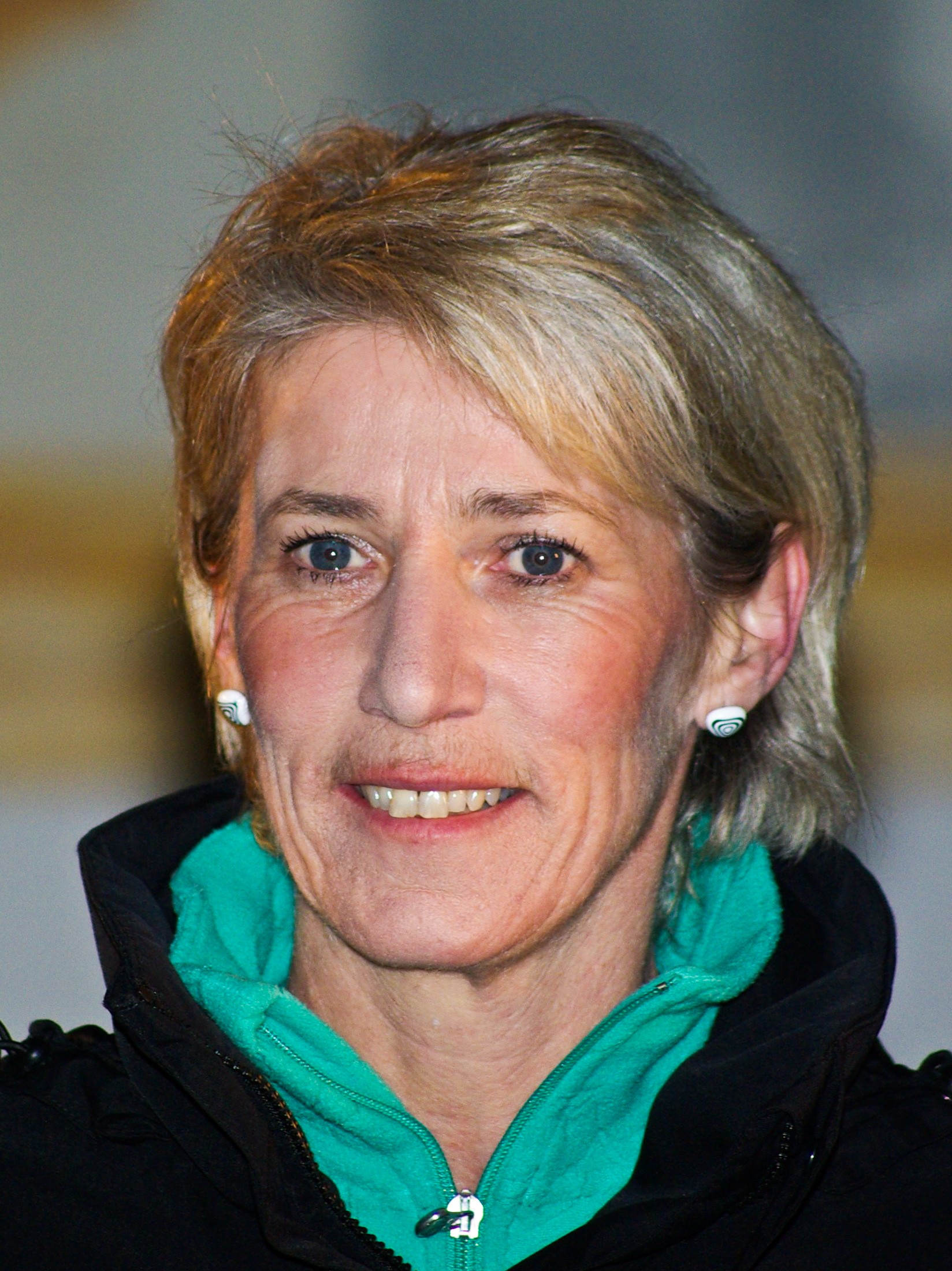
- Deufl in 2009

Personal information
- Born: 28 October 1958 Waidhofen an der Ybbs, Lower Austria, Austria
- Died: 18 August 2025 (aged 66) Göstling an der Ybbs, Lower Austria, Austria

Sport
- Country: Austria
- Sport: Alpine skiing
- Event: Downhill
Achievements and titles
Representing Austria
Women's alpine skiing
European Junior Alpine Skiing Championships
Gold medal – first place	1974 Jasná	Downhill
Bronze medal – third place	Gällivare	Downhill

Elfi Deufl (28 October 1958 – 18 August 2025) was an Austrian downhill alpine skier.

Deufl placed first at the European Junior Alpine Skiing Championships in 1974 and placed third in 1976. In the FIS Alpine Ski World Cup, she placed second in a 1975 race and third in a race the following year.

Deufl died on 18 August 2025, at the age of 66.
