= Hans Enn =

Austrian alpine ski racer

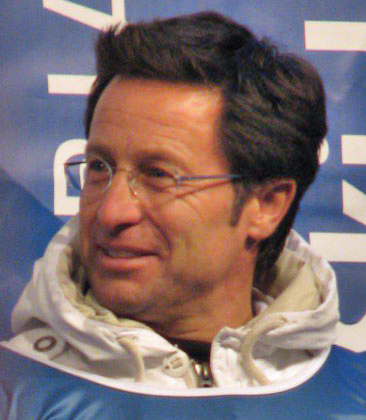
- Enn in 2009

Personal information
- Born: May 10, 1958 (age 68) Saalfelden am Steinernen Meer, Salzburg, Austria
- Height: 167 cm (5 ft 5 1/2 in)

Skiing career
- Country: Austria
- Sport: Alpine skiing
- Club: SC Saalbach Hinterglemm
- Coached by: Hans Hinterholzer
- Retired: 1989
- Disciplines: Giant slalom
- World Cup debut: 17 January 1976 (age 17)

Olympics
- Teams: 2 – (1980, 1984)
- Medals: 1 (1 bronze)

World Championships
- Teams: 4
- Medals: 1 (1 bronze)

World Cup
- Seasons: 14 – (1975/76–1988/89)
- Wins: 6 – (5 GS, 1 SG)
- Podiums: 22
- Overall titles: 0
- Discipline titles: 0
Medal record
Men's alpine skiing
Representing Austria
Olympic Games
Bronze medal – third place	1980 Lake Placid	Giant Slalom

Hans Enn (born 10 May 1958) is an Austrian former alpine ski racer who competed in the FIS Alpine Ski World Cup from 1976 to 1989. At the 1980 Winter Olympics in Lake Placid, he won a bronze medal in the men's giant slalom and finished fourth in the men's slalom.

Enn won six World Cup races and finished on the podium 22 times, with five victories in giant slalom and one in super-G. His best overall World Cup finish was seventh in 1979–1980, when he also finished second in the giant slalom standings; he finished third in that discipline's standings in 1983–1984.

His career was interrupted by several injuries, including fractures to his tibia and fibula in 1981 and a cruciate ligament injury in 1989. After several operations and an unsuccessful attempt to return for the planned 1991 Alpine World Ski Championships, he ended his competitive career. He remained involved in the sport through ski development, material testing and guiding, as well as tourism in Saalbach-Hinterglemm.

== Early life and junior career ==
=== Childhood in Hinterglemm ===
Enn was born on 10 May 1958 in Saalfelden am Steinernen Meer, in the Austrian state of Salzburg, and grew up in nearby Hinterglemm. He represented SC Saalbach-Hinterglemm during his racing career. Enn later recalled that he had wanted to become a ski racer from an early age, and identified former Austrian racer Hans Hinterholzer as an important influence on his development as a young skier.

=== Junior career ===
Enn won multiple Austrian youth champions in 1974 and 1976 before moving into senior international competition. He entered the Austrian Ski Federation's squad before making his World Cup debut. His first World Cup start came in the downhill at Morzine on 17 January 1976, where he finished ninth.

== World Cup career ==
=== Emergence, 1976–1979 ===
During his first seasons Enn competed in several disciplines, including downhill, slalom, giant slalom and the combined. At the 1978 World Championships in Garmisch-Partenkirchen, he finished sixth in giant slalom and 11th in slalom. In March 1979 he reached his first World Cup podiums, finishing second in giant slalom at Lake Placid and third at Heavenly Valley. He finished the 1978–1979 World Cup season 12th overall and ninth in giant slalom.

=== Breakthrough and Olympic season, 1979–1980 ===
The 1979–1980 season produced Enn's best overall World Cup finish. He finished seventh overall and second in giant slalom, with 100 overall points and 87 giant slalom points. At the 1980 Winter Olympics in Lake Placid, Enn won the bronze medal in the men's giant slalom. He was second after the first run and finished behind Ingemar Stenmark of Sweden and Andreas Wenzel of Liechtenstein, with a combined time of 2:42.51.

The men's slalom was held on 22 February 1980. Enn finished fourth, with a total time of 1:45.12, 0.06 seconds behind bronze medallist Jacques Lüthy. He was tied for second after the first run. On 26 February 1980 Enn won his first World Cup race, taking the giant slalom at Waterville Valley.

=== Injury and return, 1980–1983 ===
Enn remained competitive in giant slalom during the 1980–1981 season, finishing second in both the giant slalom and combined World Cup standings. In February 1981, Enn fractured his tibia and fibula while warming up for a giant slalom at Voss. He returned to World Cup competition in 1982 and finished sixth in giant slalom at the 1982 World Championships in Schladming in February. In the 1981–1982 World Cup season he finished fourth in the giant slalom standings.

Enn continued to produce notable results in the following seasons. He finished second in super-G at Madonna di Campiglio in December 1982 and won the giant slalom at Kranjska Gora on 29 January 1983.

=== Peak years, 1983–1985 ===
On 10 December 1983 Enn won the World Cup Super-G at Val-d'Isère, his only World Cup victory in the discipline. In March 1984 he won consecutive giant slaloms at Åre and Oslo. He finished third in the giant slalom World Cup standings, his second top-three finish in the discipline's season standings.

At the 1984 Winter Olympics in Sarajevo, Enn failed to finish the giant slalom and slalom. On 15 January 1985 Enn won the giant slalom at Adelboden, the sixth and final World Cup victory of his career. At the 1985 World Championships in Bormio, he finished fifth in giant slalom.

=== Later career, 1985–1988 ===
After 1985, Enn's overall World Cup rankings declined. He finished 19th overall in 1984–1985, 36th in 1985–1986 and 74th in 1986–1987. In 1985–1986 he finished eighth in the super-G standings. The 1986–1987 season ended early after Enn suffered an injury in the giant slalom at Adelboden on 20 January 1987. Enn returned in 1987–1988 and recorded six top-ten World Cup finishes, three in giant slalom and three in super-G. His best result was fourth in super-G at the World Cup final in Saalbach-Hinterglemm. He did not compete at the 1988 Winter Olympics in Calgary.

=== Final World Cup season, 1988–1989 ===
Enn returned to the World Cup podium twice in the 1988–1989 season. He finished third in giant slalom at Val Thorens on 29 November 1988 and second in super-G at Laax on 8 January 1989. The Laax result was his 22nd and final World Cup podium.

On 10 January 1989 Enn tore the cruciate ligament in his left knee during the giant slalom at Kirchberg in Tirol. Despite the injury, he returned to competition in time for the World Championships at Vail, where he finished 13th in super-G and failed to finish the giant slalom.

According to Glaser's history of the Salzburg state skiing association, complications from the injury led to five operations over the following nine months. Enn attempted to return for the planned 1991 Alpine World Ski Championships in Saalbach-Hinterglemm, but the comeback was unsuccessful and he ended his competitive career.

== Olympic career ==
Enn competed at two Winter Olympics, in 1980 and 1984. At the 1980 Winter Olympics in Lake Placid, he won the bronze medal in giant slalom and finished fourth in slalom. He was second after the first giant slalom run and finished 0.06 seconds behind bronze medallist Jacques Lüthy in the slalom. At the 1984 Winter Olympics in Sarajevo, Enn failed to finish both the giant slalom and the slalom. The FIS also catalogs the 1980 Lake Placid alpine events as World Championship events. Its career summary records one World Championship podium for Enn, corresponding to his giant slalom bronze.

== Competitive profile ==
=== Giant slalom ===
Giant slalom was Enn's most successful World Cup discipline: he won five races and finished on the giant slalom podium 16 times. He was runner-up in the giant slalom World Cup standings in 1979–1980 and finished third in 1983–1984.

=== Super-G ===
Enn also established himself as a regular super-G podium finisher during the 1980s, finishing second at Madonna di Campiglio in December 1982 and winning at Val-d'Isère in December 1983. He recorded five World Cup podiums in the discipline. He continued to produce high finishes late in his career, including fourth place in the super-G at the 1988 World Cup final in Saalbach-Hinterglemm and second place at Laax in January 1989.

== Life after racing ==
After retiring from competitive skiing, Enn remained involved in the sport, including work in ski development and material testing for Blizzard. He later became involved in hospitality and tourism, opening a hotel in Hinterglemm. Accounts also identify him as a ski guide. Enn was also associated with marketing Neuro Socks, a brand of socks, insoles, and patches.

== Honours ==
Enn was named Salzburg's male Sportsperson of the Year in 1984 and 1988 in the annual sports election organized by Salzburger Nachrichten. In 1996 he received the Goldenes Verdienstzeichen, the Decoration of Merit in Gold of the Republic of Austria.

== Championship results ==
Enn competed at the standalone World Championships in 1978, 1982, 1985 and 1989. FIS also classifies the 1980 Lake Placid alpine events as World Championship events; its career summary records seven World Championship starts and one podium for Enn.

Year	Venue	Competition	Discipline	Result
1978	Garmisch-Partenkirchen	FIS Alpine World Ski Championships 1978	Giant slalom	6th
1978	Garmisch-Partenkirchen	FIS Alpine World Ski Championships 1978	Slalom	11th
1980	Lake Placid	1980 Winter Olympics / World Championships	Giant slalom	Bronze
1980	Lake Placid	1980 Winter Olympics / World Championships	Slalom	4th
1982	Schladming	FIS Alpine World Ski Championships 1982	Giant slalom	6th
1985	Bormio	FIS Alpine World Ski Championships 1985	Giant slalom	5th
1989	Vail	FIS Alpine World Ski Championships 1989	Super-G	13th
1989	Vail	FIS Alpine World Ski Championships 1989	Giant slalom	DNF

== World Cup statistics ==
=== World Cup victories ===
Enn won six World Cup races between February 1980 and January 1985.

Season	Date	Location	Discipline
1979–80	26 February 1980	Waterville Valley	Giant slalom
1982–83	29 January 1983	Kranjska Gora	Giant slalom
1983–84	10 December 1983	Val-d'Isère	Super-G
1983–84	17 March 1984	Åre	Giant slalom
1983–84	23 March 1984	Oslo	Giant slalom
1984–85	15 January 1985	Adelboden	Giant slalom

=== World Cup podiums ===
Enn finished on the World Cup podium 22 times: 16 times in giant slalom, five times in super-G and once in the combined.

Season	1st	2nd	3rd	Total
1978–79	0	1	1	2
1979–80	1	1	2	4
1980–81	0	3	0	3
1981–82	0	2	0	2
1982–83	1	1	1	3
1983–84	3	0	2	5
1984–85	1	0	0	1
1988–89	0	1	1	2
Total	6	9	7	22

=== World Cup season standings ===
Season	Overall	Points	Downhill	Slalom	Giant slalom	Super-G	Combined
1975–76	56th	2	23rd	—	—	—	—
1976–77	35th	26	22nd	—	20th	—	—
1977–78	38th	12	—	17th	19th	—	—
1978–79	12th	81	—	25th	9th	—	—
1979–80	7th	100	—	13th	2nd	—	—
1980–81	14th	93	38th	30th	9th	—	4th
1981–82	13th	75	—	—	4th	—	—
1982–83	20th	84	—	—	5th	—	43rd
1983–84	11th	105	—	—	3rd	—	—
1984–85	19th	80	—	—	6th	—	16th
1985–86	36th	47	—	—	17th	8th	—
1986–87	74th	8	—	—	25th	—	—
1987–88	26th	51	—	—	14th	10th	—
1988–89	35th	41	—	—	13th	9th	—

Source: FIS World Cup standings.

== See also ==
- List of Olympic medalists in alpine skiing
