= Martial Donnet =

Swiss alpine skier (born 1956)

Personal information
- Born: 22 September 1956 (age 69) Troistorrents, Switzerland

Sport
- Sport: alpine skiing

Martial Donnet (born 22 September 1956) is a Swiss former alpine skier.

== See also ==
- Glossary of skiing and snowboarding terms
- History of skiing
- Swiss Alps
