= Jože Kuralt =

Slovenian alpine skier (1956–1986)

Jože Kuralt (14 October 1956 in Škofja Loka, PR Slovenia, FPR Yugoslavia – 24 March 1986 in Sachsenburg, Austria, near Spittal an der Drau) was a Slovenian former alpine skier who competed for Yugoslavia in the 1980 Winter Olympics and 1984 Winter Olympics. He died in a car accident in Sachsenburg. He had flown from Furano, Japan to Munich, West Germany; Daniel Stane Kurak, a team-manager, was the driver.
