= Greg Jones (skier) =

American alpine skier (born 1953)

Personal information
- Full name: Gregory Jones
- Born: December 3, 1953 (age 72) Tahoe City, California, U.S.

Skiing career
- Sport: Alpine skiing
- Retired: 1979 (age 25)
- Disciplines: downhill, giant slalom, slalom, combined
- World Cup debut: 1974

Olympics
- Teams: 1 – (1976)
- Medals: 0

World Championships
- Teams: 2 – (1974, 1976)
- Medals: 1 (0 gold)

World Cup
- Seasons: 5 – (1975–79)
- Wins: 1 – (1 GS)
- Podiums: 2 – (2 GS)
- Overall titles: 0 – (18th in 1976)
- Discipline titles: 0 – (6th in GS, 1976)
Medal record
Men's alpine skiing
Representing the United States
World Championships
Bronze medal – third place	1976 Innsbruck	Combined

Gregory Jones (born December 3, 1953) is a former World Cup alpine ski racer from the United States.

Born in Tahoe City, California, he specialized in giant slalom. Jones competed in all three events at the 1976 Winter Olympics and finished 9th in the giant slalom, 11th in the downhill, and 19th in the slalom. His all-around performance earned a World Championship bronze medal in the combined event.

Jones won a World Cup race a few weeks later in the United States at Copper Mountain, Colorado. Teammate Phil Mahre was the runner-up for the first-ever one-two finish by U.S. men in a World Cup race.

Jones was inducted into the U.S. Ski & Snowboard Hall of Fame in 1978.

== World Cup Results ==
=== Race podiums ===
- 1 win – (1 GS)
- 2 podiums – (2 GS)

Season	Date	Location	Discipline	Place
1975	18 Dec 1974	Madonna di Campiglio, Italy	Giant slalom	2nd
1976	5 Mar 1976	(United States) Copper Mountain, USA	Giant slalom	1st

=== Season standings ===
Season	Age	Overall	Slalom	Giant slalom	Super G	Downhill	Combined
1975	21	19	—	8	not run	—	
1976	22	18	—	6	not run	—	—
1977	23	54	—	—	not run	—	

- Points were only awarded for top ten finishes (see scoring system).

== World championship results ==
Year	Age	Slalom	Giant slalom	Super-G	Downhill	Combined
1974	20	—	18	not run	16	—
1976	22	19	9	not run	11	3

From 1948 through 1980, the Winter Olympics were also the World Championships for alpine skiing.

== Olympic results ==
Year	Age	Slalom	Giant slalom	Super-G	Downhill	Combined
1976	22	19	9	not run	11	not run
