= Klaus Eberhard (skier) =

Austrian alpine skier (born 1956)

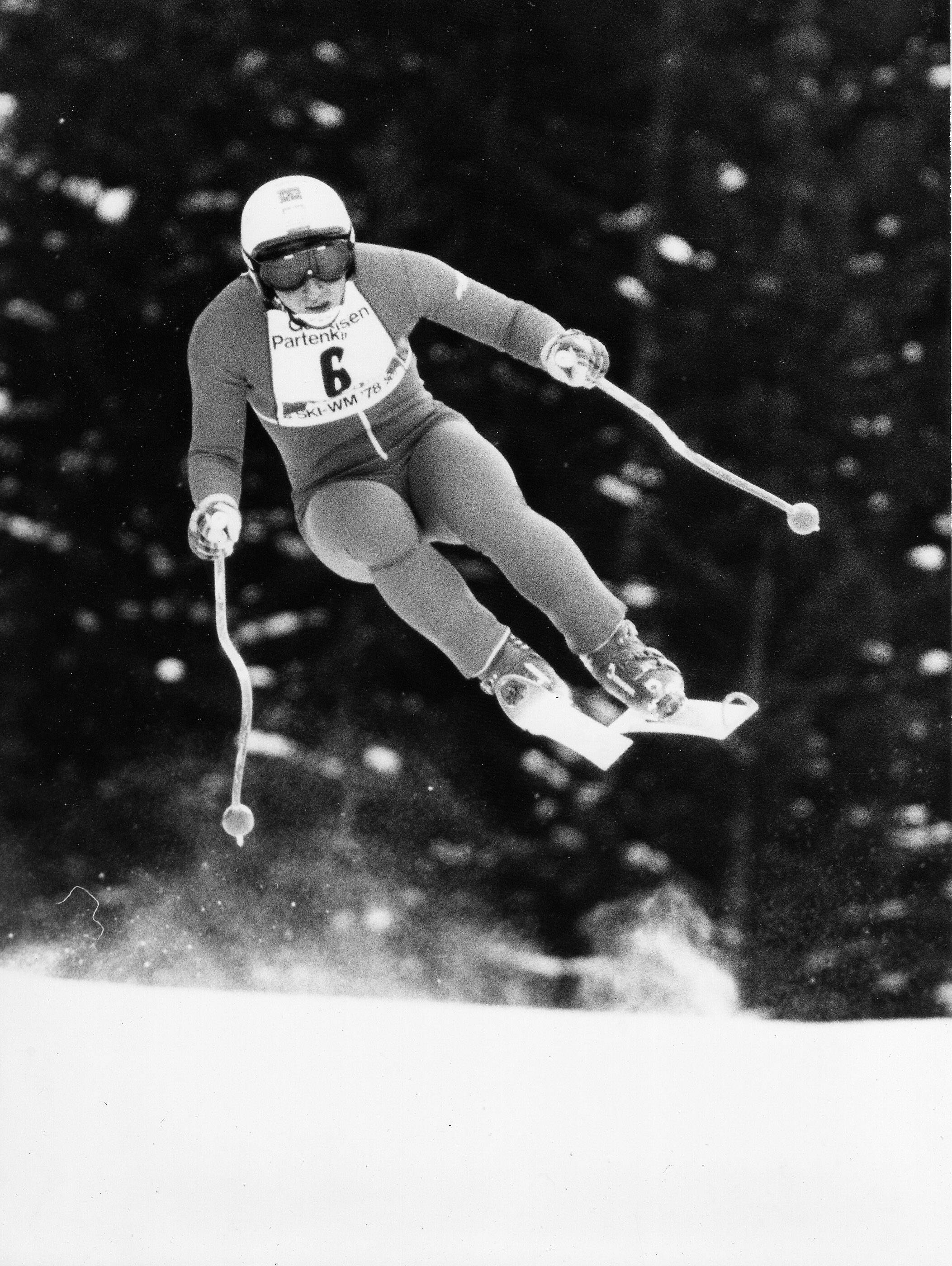
Klaus Eberhard (1978)

Klaus Eberhard (born 4 April 1956 in Baden bei Wien) is an Austrian former alpine skier who competed in the men's downhill at the 1976 Winter Olympics, finishing 19th.
