= Engelhard Pargätzi =

Swiss alpine skier (born 1949)

Engelhard Pargätzi (born 31 July 1949 in Arosa) is a Swiss retired alpine skier who competed in the men's giant slalom at the 1976 Winter Olympics, finishing 6th.
