= Leonardo David =

Italian alpine skier

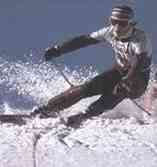

Personal information
- Born: 27 September 1960 Gressoney-Saint-Jean, Aosta Valley, Italy
- Died: 26 February 1985 (aged 24) Gressoney-La-Trinité, Aosta Valley, Italy

Skiing career
- Sport: Alpine skiing
- Disciplines: Slalom, giant slalom, downhill
- World Cup debut: 1978

Olympics
- Teams: 0

World Championships
- Teams: 0

World Cup
- Seasons: 1 – (1979)
- Wins: 1 – (1 SL)
- Podiums: 4 – (1 GS, 3 SL)
- Overall titles: 0 – (11th in 1979)
- Discipline titles: 0 – (8th in SL, 1979)

Leonardo David (27 September 1960 – 26 February 1985) was a World Cup alpine ski racer from northwestern Italy.

== Biography ==
Born in Gressoney-Saint-Jean, Aosta Valley, he died of heart failure in Gressoney-La-Trinité after nearly six years in a coma, caused by injuries he sustained in a fall near Lake Placid, New York, on 3 March 1979.

David fell a few meters before the finish of the pre-Olympic downhill at Whiteface Mountain. He slid mostly on his back and his skis remained on. After coming to a stop, David arose and skied over to his coach, bent down to remove his skis, and collapsed. He was airlifted by military helicopter to Burlington, Vermont, where surgeons removed a blood clot in his brain.

He had fallen two weeks earlier, in the downhill race of the Italian national championships at Cortina d'Ampezzo, and a friend reported David had complained of ongoing headaches since. He had been examined by a neurosurgeon, but was allowed to join the Italian team for the conclusion of the World Cup season in North America and Japan.

Then age 18, David was a promising talent on the Italian team, in his first year on the World Cup circuit. He won the overall and slalom titles of the European Cup in 1978, and placed second in giant slalom. He won his only World Cup race, a slalom in Oslo, less than a month before his accident, outpacing Ingemar Stenmark and Phil Mahre. David had 10 top ten finishes with four podiums during the 1979 World Cup season, and finished in 11th place in the overall standings with 85 points.

After nearly three months in a coma in Burlington, David was flown to Italy on a special U.S. military transport in late May, and hospitalized in Novara. In late July, David was flown to Innsbruck, Austria, for intensified treatment and was thought to be emerging from the coma in September. More than three years later, he was taken to Leningrad (St. Petersburg) in the Soviet Union for a last-ditch effort to revive him in December 1982. He died at home in February 1985 of an apparent heart attack. In 1990, three physicians were indicted on manslaughter charges in Italy on the grounds that David should not have been allowed to compete after his fall at Cortina d'Ampezzo.

David's parents run a small ski shop at Gressoney and it is kept as a small museum in memory of their son. Visitors can see his skis, Italian ski team posters on the shop roof showing him, with Piero Gros, and Gustav Thöni among others, all his trophies and some pictures. At the front wall of the parish church in Gressoney-Saint-Jean a memorial plaque is dedicated to David, and a racing piste is named after him in Gressoney Saint Jean.

== World Cup results ==
=== Season standings ===
| Season | Age | Overall | Slalom | Giant Slalom | Super G | Downhill | Combined |
|---|---|---|---|---|---|---|---|
| 1979 | 18 | 11 | 8 | 15 | not run | — | — |

- Points were only awarded for top ten finishes (see scoring system).

=== Race podiums ===
- 1 win (1 SL)
- 4 podiums (1 GS, 3 SL), 10 top tens (5 GS, 5 SL)

| Season | Date | Location | Discipline | Place |
|---|---|---|---|---|
| 1979 | 9 Dec 1978 | Schladming, Austria | Giant slalom | 3rd |
| 1979 | 21 Dec 1978 | Kranjska Gora, Slovenia | Slalom | 3rd |
| 1979 | 5 Feb 1979 | Jasná, Czechoslovakia | Slalom | 2nd |
| 1979 | 7 Feb 1979 | Oslo, Norway | Slalom | 1st |

== Video ==
- Racing footage of Leonardo David, including final fall on YouTube
