= Lauberhorn (downhill ski course) =

Ski course

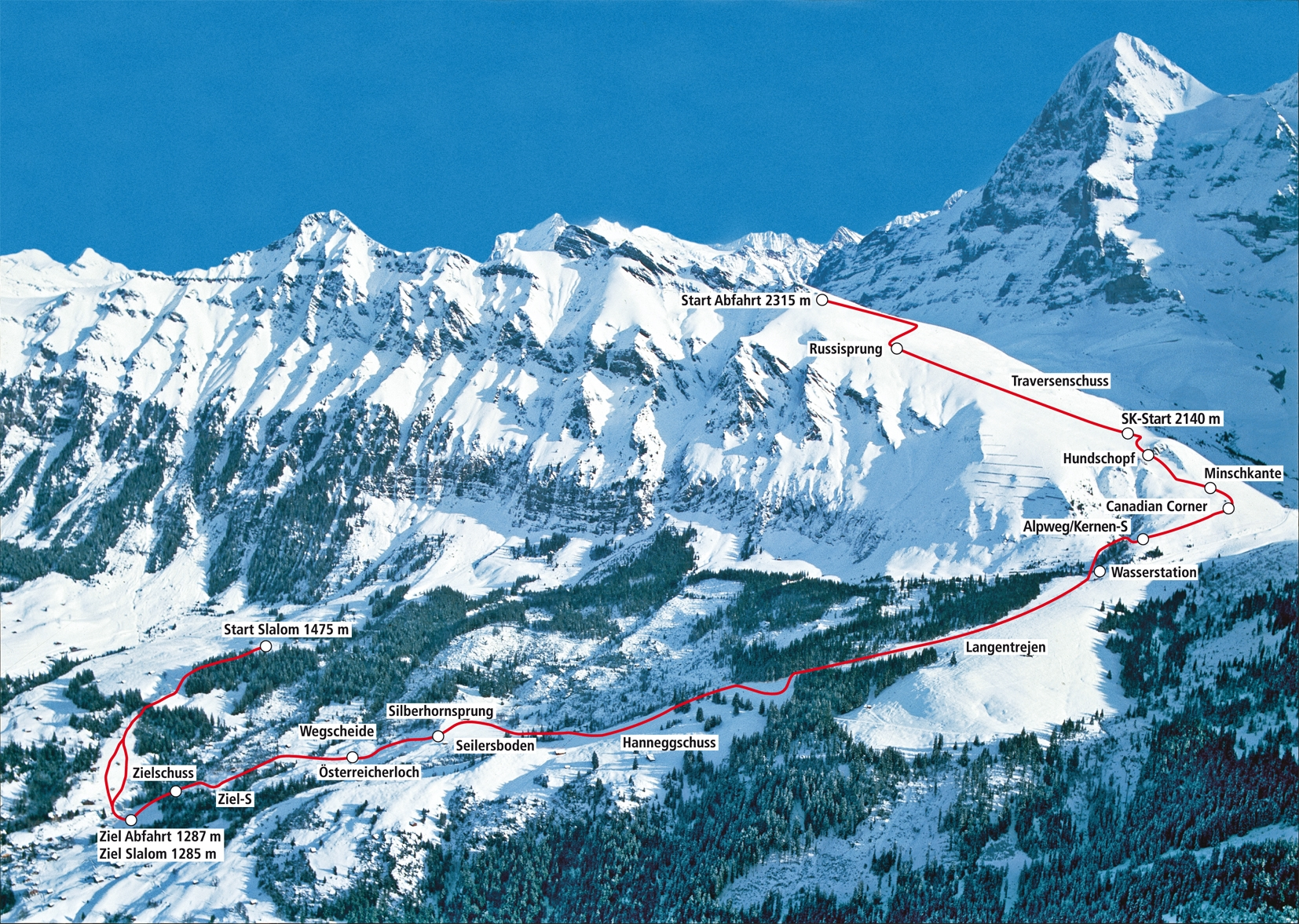
- Interactive map of Lauberhorn
- Location within Switzerland Location within Alps Location within Europe
- 46°35′35″N 7°55′26″E
- Location: Wengen, Switzerland
- Mountain: Lauberhorn
- Opened: 1930; 96 years ago
- Member: Club5+
- Level: advanced
- Competition: Lauberhornrennen

Downhill
- Start: 2,315 m (7,595 ft) (AA)
- Finish: 1,287 m (4,222 ft)
- Vertical drop: 1,028 m (3,373 ft)
- Length: 4,480 m (2.78 mi)
- Max incline: 42 degrees (90%)
- Avg incline: 14.7 degrees (26.2%)
- Min incline: 6 degrees (10.5%)
- Most Wins (M): Karl Molitor (6x)

Super-G
- Start: 2,025 m (6,644 ft) (AA)
- Finish: 1,287 m (4,222 ft)
- Vertical drop: 738 m (2,421 ft)
- Length: 2,950 m (1.83 mi)

Lauberhorn is the longest and oldest active World Cup downhill ski course in the world, which is located and named after the same name mountain in Wengen, Switzerland. It debuted in 1930 and with Switzerland's long history of neutrality, downhill competitions were held during World War II.

Part of the Lauberhornrennen, the oldest active alpine ski competition in the world, the downhill course offers a scenic route underneath the massive Eiger, Mönch, and Jungfrau mountains in the Bernese Alps.

The Lauberhorn is the longest course on the World Cup circuit at 4.48 kilometres (2.78 miles). Its incline of 42 degrees (90%) at the iconic "Hundschopf" jump course is the steepest section on the circuit.

In 1983, slalom was going to be held on this downhill course, not on Männlichen slalom course, the only time in history of this race. However all races that weekend were cancelled due to heavy snowfall.

On 18 January 1991, at the official downhill training, one of the most horrifying fatal crashes happened when Austrian Gernot Reinstadler crashed at full speed into the safety net below the Ziel-S, immediately before the finish. All races were cancelled that weekend and new safety measures were implemented.

Lauberhorn was one of the most traditional venues of combined events (classic, super, and alpine).

== Sections ==
=== Start house ===
2,315 m (7,595 ft) a.s.l. – Unlike most World Cup start houses that are temporary, the Lauberhorn's is permanent, classic, and wooden, with a view of the Eiger, Mönch, and Jungfrau triple mountain peaks.

=== Starthang and Obere Kurve ===
2,315 m a.s.l. – The upper flat part has sliding parts and long curves. A "Simple" start with a low gradient and hardly any turning requires great acceleration and gliding skills. It turns into a long right-hand bend that leads over a narrow passage between rocks and safety nets to the Russisprung.

=== Russisprung ===
2,180 m (7,152 ft) a.s.l. – The Russi jump (Russisprung) was built for testing purposes by ex-ski racer and piste builder Bernhard Russi in 1988 and named after him. At the instigation of race director Fredy Fuchs, the jump was integrated into the race track. The jump leads into flat terrain and is ideally around 40 to 50 meters long. The Russisprung leads past a reservoir that was created to feed the snowmaking systems.

=== Traversenschuss ===
2,120 m a.s.l. – Another gliding part, the "traverse shot" interspersed with slight curves and two terrain waves. It goes from 100 to over 130 km/h (81 mph).

=== Traverse ===
2,010 m a.s.l. – A sharp left turn forms the transition to the traverse, in which the terrain slopes away to the right. Only here, after 40 seconds of skiing, is the first intermediate time measured. The start of the combination downhill run is in this region.

=== Panoramakurve ===
2,000 m a.s.l. – Due to the ever faster material, adjustments have been necessary again and again throughout the history of the slope. In order to reduce the speed, the so-called panoramic curve was created in order to reduce the speed of the skiers before the tricky passage at Hundschopf. The long right-hand bend gets its name from the view of the Eiger, Mönch and Jungfrau peaks towering monumentally above the slope.

=== Hundschopf ===
1,975 m (6,480 ft) a.s.l. – After a tight S-curve to reduce the speed, comes the most famous part of the descent, the spectacular jump over the Hundschopf. The edge lies in a narrow place between two rocks, where it drops 15 meters. The short fall space and the slope that immediately turns to the left make the area even more difficult. «Everything that is required of a downhill skier comes into play in the tightest of spaces. The curves in front of it are narrower than usual, there are a maximum of 5 meters between the rocks on the left and the safety net on the right, the edge of the jump can only be guessed at, the choice of the skier's line is determined by the end of the net and the skier's imagination. And then the bottomless!» (Bernhard Russi)

=== Minsch-Kante ===
1,915 m a.s.l. – Immediately after the left-hand bend comes the Minsch edge, where Josef Minsch had a serious fall in 1965. It is a smaller jump, but its difficulty lies in the fact that it is approached in a left-hand movement and left in a right-hand movement - the rider has to change the inner ski on the edge of the jump, so to speak. Russi describes the spot as a «brilliant combination of jump, curve and choice of line!»

=== Canadian Corner ===
1,890 m a.s.l. – The sharply turning curve at the left-sloping transition into the Alpweg is named after the Crazy Canucks, a place where Dave Irwin and Ken Read crashed in 1976. The goal is to stay crouched despite the strong rotation. From here, the route briefly follows the Hasenbach valley parallel to the Wengernalpbahn. The Girmschbiel hill, located on the opposite side of the small valley, has become a fan stadium in the middle of the route for several years thanks to its location right next to the Wengernalp train station. On the hill and in the temporary bars and VIP zones set up there, over 10,000 visitors watch the race - only here they have a direct view of the famous key points of Hundschopf, Minsch-Kante and Canadian Corner.

=== Alpweg ===
1,860 m a.s.l. – Another fast gliding section, the Alpweg. The section is built as a just three meter wide connecting piece between the upper and lower parts of the run in the middle of the steep slope in the Hasenbachtal and must therefore be secured with safety nets on the left.

=== Kernen-S / Brüggli-S ===
At an elevation of 1,825 meters above sea level, this segment features a tight combination of right-and-left chicane passing over a short bridge. Entering at speeds around 100 km/h, skiers must drift to decelerate and maintain an efficient racing line without sacrificing high velocity. The exit trajectory often forces competitors slightly up the opposing slope. This technically demanding section has led to the elimination of notable downhill skiers, including Karl Molitor, Jean-Claude Killy, Toni Sailer and Karl Schranz. Maintaining an exit speed of at least 70 km/h is necessary to avoid losing time on the subsequent gliding sections. Until 2007, this passage was known as Brüggli-S. It was renamed following the retirement of Bruno Kernen, who escaped serious injury after a severe crash at the site in 1997.

=== Steilhang vor der Wasserstation ===
1,775 m a.s.l. – The racer takes a small jump to reach a steep slope, but it is too short to pick up speed again if it has been lost in the Kernen-S.

=== Wasserstation ===
1,770 m a.s.l. – Here the route runs through a short and narrow tunnel under the tracks of the Wengernalp Railway. The tunnel is only 9 meters wide, although the accessible area is significantly narrower due to the vaulted ceiling, the snow and the safety padding. After the tunnel, the route unusually runs a few meters uphill. This spot is unique in the World Cup and is therefore one of the distinguishing features of the Lauberhorn route.

=== Langentrejen ===
1,775 m a.s.l. – Extraordinarily elongated glider section. Where the route was straight in the 1950s, today there are curves like in a Super-G. It has no key points and is relatively unspectacular in terms of landscape, which is why it is sometimes omitted from television broadcasts. Nevertheless, this passage can be decisive in the race, as the driver can lose the race here if he chooses the wrong material or has insufficient gliding and aerodynamic skills. Mental conduct also plays a role, as the driver has time to reflect on his previous race on the long, rather flat section.

=== Hanneggschuss ===
1,590 m a.s.l. – This impressive steep slope in the middle of the forest has the highest speeds in this sport. In 2013, Johan Clarey reached the highest speed in World Cup history at 161.9 km/h (100.6 mph). Approached via a left-hand bend, the upper part of the steep slope is slightly flatter than the lower one - the terrain transition can be "pushed" like a wave or jumped like an edge. The speed is so high here that the skis only come into contact with the ground every 10 meters. The compression at the foot of the steep slope must be managed with particular sensitivity.

=== Seilersboden ===
1,470 m a.s.l. – A very flat section, a long left-right combination leads to the Silberhornsprung. «A brief moment of calm. Here, on this small flat piece, breathing can return to normal. After the 'crescendo' in the Haneggschuss, you have to switch to a fine feeling of pressure and speed in the flat left-hand bend." (B. Russi)

=== Silberhornsprung ===
1,450 m a.s.l. – After this passage you go over the Silberhornsprung (jump), which was newly built in 2003. The jump was designed so that in the camera angle of the television broadcasts, the picturesque triangle shaped Silberhorn mountain can be seen in the background alongside the jumping racers. The difficulty here is choosing the line when approaching, as the jump is in the middle of a right-hand bend.

=== Wegscheide ===
1,420 m a.s.l. – The passage through the forest is characterized by restless curves.

=== Österreicherloch ===
1,390 m a.s.l. – The Österreicherloch belongs to the crossroads and got its name in 1954 after three Austrians fell here: Toni Sailer, Anderl Molterer, and Walter Schuster. The bumps on the course here that caused their falls have since been removed.

=== Ziel-S ===
1,385 m (4,544 ft) a.s.l. – A sharp left turn with a subsequent bump leads to the last key point, the Ziel-S. At this point, all other World Cup downhills are long over. The technically difficult, heavily turning, often icy and unsettled right-left combination at the end of the long descent demands a lot of strength from the racers and often decides the outcome of the race.

=== Zielschuss ===
1,325 m (4,347 ft) a.s.l. – The target S leads into the target shot, the second steepest section after the Hundschopf. The finish jump was flattened before the 2009 race for safety reasons and the access road was widened. Previously, many riders had fallen here, including Peter Müller, Silvano Beltrametti, Adrien Duvillard and Bode Miller - who slid across the finish line as the winner. The target shot still demands the last reserves from skier.

=== Finish ===
1,287 m (4,222 ft) a.s.l. – Unlike on the similarly spectacular Streif in Kitzbühel, the racer only sees the finish stadium with the temporary grandstand and the permanent media center at the finish line. The destination is in Innerwengen, around one kilometer south of the village center.

== Gallery ==
=== From top to bottom ===
Start house	Russisprung	Traversenschuss	Panoramakurve
180x	180x	180x	180x

Hundschopf	Minsch-Kante	Canadian Corner	Alpenweg
180x	180x	180x	180x

Kernen-S / Brüggli-S	Wasserstation	Langentrejen	Hanneggschuss
180x	180x	180x	180x

Österreicherloch	Ziel-S	Zielschuss	Finish area
180x	180x	180x	180x

== Races ==
=== Men ===
Combined times didn't count for World Cup between 1967 and 1974.

No.	Type	Season	Date	Winner	Second	Third
International Lauberhornrennen
—	DH	1930	1930	(Switzerland) Christian Rubi	(United Kingdom) L. F. W. Jackson	(United Kingdom) Bill Bracken
—	KB	1930	1930	(United Kingdom) Bill Bracken	N/A	N/A
—	DH	1931	1931	(Switzerland) Fritz Steuri	(United Kingdom) H. R. D. Waghorn	(Switzerland) Willy Steuri
—	KB	1931	1931	(Switzerland) Fritz Steuri	N/A	N/A
—	DH	1932	1932	(Switzerland) Fritz Steuri	(Switzerland) Willy Steuri	(Switzerland) Gody Michel
—	KB	1932	1932	(Switzerland) Fritz Steuri	N/A	N/A
In 1933 it was the only time in the history of Lauberhornrennen when competition wasn't organized
—	DH	1934	1934	(Switzerland) Adolf Rubi	(Switzerland) Arnold Glatthard	(Switzerland) Ernst von Allmen
—	KB	1934	1934	(Switzerland) Adolf Rubi	N/A	N/A
—	DH	1935	1935	(Austria) Richard Werle	(Switzerland) Willy Steuri	(Switzerland) Karl Graf
—	KB	1935	1935	(Switzerland) Hans Rubi	N/A	N/A
—	DH	1936	1936	(Switzerland) Hans Schlunegger	(France) Émile Allais	(Austria) Wilhelm Walch
—	KB	1936	1936	(France) Émile Allais	N/A	N/A
—	DH	1937	1937	(Switzerland) Heinz von Allmen	(Austria) Wilhelm Walch	(Austria) Franz Zingerle
—	KB	1937	1937	(Austria) Wilhelm Walch	N/A	N/A
—	DH	1938	1938	(Switzerland) Heinz von Allmen	(Nazi Germany) Rudolf Cranz	(Austria) Wilhelm Walch
—	KB	1938	1938	(Switzerland) Heinz von Allmen	N/A	N/A
—	DH	1939	1939	(Switzerland) Karl Molitor	(Nazi Germany) Wilhelm Walch	(Nazi Germany) Josef Jennewein
—	KB	1939	1939	(Nazi Germany) Wilhelm Walch	N/A	N/A
—	DH	1940	1940	(Switzerland) Karl Molitor	(Switzerland) Hans Gertsch	(Switzerland) Oskar Gertsch
—	KB	1940	1940	(Switzerland) Karl Molitor	N/A	N/A
—	DH	1941	1941	(Switzerland) Rudolf Graf	(Switzerland) Otto von Allmen	(Switzerland) Hans Gertsch
—	KB	1941	1941	(Switzerland) Marcel von Allmen	N/A	N/A
—	DH	1942	1942	(Switzerland) Karl Molitor	(Switzerland) Rudolf Graf	(Switzerland) Heinz von Allmen
—	KB	1942	1942	(Switzerland) Heinz von Allmen	N/A	N/A
—	DH	1943	1943	(Switzerland) Karl Molitor	(Switzerland) Heinz von Allmen	(Switzerland) Marcel von Allmen
—	KB	1943	1943	(Switzerland) Heinz von Allmen	N/A	N/A
—	DH	1944	1944	(Switzerland) Rudolf Graf	(Switzerland) Fred Rubi	(Switzerland) Hans Gertsch
—	KB	1944	1944	(Switzerland) Marcel von Allmen	N/A	N/A
—	DH	1945	1945	(Switzerland) Karl Molitor	(Switzerland) Paul Valär	(Switzerland) Otto von Allmen
—	KB	1945	1945	(Switzerland) Otto von Allmen	N/A	N/A
—	DH	1946	1946	(France) Jean Blanc	(Switzerland) Karl Molitor	(Switzerland) Otto von Allmen
—	KB	1946	1946	(Switzerland) Karl Molitor	N/A	N/A
—	DH	1947	1947	(Switzerland) Karl Molitor	(Switzerland) Edy Rominger	(France) Jean Blanc
—	KB	1947	1947	(Switzerland) Edy Rominger	N/A	N/A
—	DH	1948	1948	(Italy) Zeno Colò	(Switzerland) Ralph Olinger	(Switzerland) Karl Molitor
—	KB	1948	1948	(Switzerland) Karl Molitor	N/A	N/A
—	DH	1949	1949	(Switzerland) Rudolf Graf	(Switzerland) Ralph Olinger	(Italy) Luc de Bigontina
—	KB	1949	1949	(Switzerland) Adolf Odermatt	N/A	N/A
—	DH	1950	1950	(Switzerland) Fred Rubi	(Switzerland) Bernhard Perren	(Switzerland) Rudolf Graf
—	KB	1950	1950	(Switzerland) Fred Rubi	N/A	N/A
—	DH	1951	1951	(Austria) Othmar Schneider	(Austria) Otto Linher	(Italy) Zeno Colò
—	KB	1951	1951	(Austria) Othmar Schneider	N/A	N/A
—	DH	1952	1952	(Austria) Othmar Schneider	(France) Maurice Sanglard	(Austria) Otto Linher
—	KB	1952	1952	(Austria) Othmar Schneider	N/A	N/A
FIS–A
—	DH	1953	1953	(Austria) Andreas Molterer	(Switzerland) Bernhard Perren	(Austria) Martin Strolz
—	KB	1953	1953	(Austria) Andreas Molterer	N/A	N/A
—	DH	1954	1954	(Austria) Christian Pravda	(Austria) Martin Strolz	(Switzerland) Martin Julen
—	KB	1954	1954	(Austria) Christian Pravda	N/A	N/A
—	DH	1955	1955	(Austria) Toni Sailer	(Austria) Andreas Molterer	(Austria) Ernst Oberaigner
—	KB	1955	1955	(Austria) Toni Sailer	N/A	N/A
—	DH	1956	1956	(Austria) Toni Sailer	(Austria) Josef Rieder	(Austria) Othmar Schneider
—	KB	1956	1956	(Austria) Josef Rieder	N/A	N/A
—	DH	1957	1957	(Austria) Toni Sailer	(Switzerland) Roger Staub	(Austria) Egon Zimmermann
—	KB	1957	1957	(Austria) Josef Rieder	N/A	N/A
—	DH	1958	1958	(Austria) Toni Sailer	(United States) Wallace Werner	(Switzerland) Willi Forrer
—	KB	1958	1958	(United States) Wallace Werner	N/A	N/A
—	DH	1959	1959	(Austria) Karl Schranz	(Austria) Andreas Molterer	(Switzerland) Roger Staub
—	KB	1959	1959	(Austria) Ernst Oberaigner	N/A	N/A
—	DH	1960	1960	(West Germany) Willy Bogner	(Austria) Josef Stiegler	(Austria) Egon Zimmermann
—	KB	1960	1960	(Austria) Josef Stiegler	N/A	N/A
—	DH	1961	1961	(France) Guy Périllat	(Austria) Gerhard Nenning	(Austria) Karl Schranz
—	KB	1961	1961	(France) Guy Périllat	N/A	N/A
	DH	1962	1962	downhill cancelled (SL was held); and consequently also combined event		
—	DH	1963	1963	(Austria) Karl Schranz	(France) Émile Viollat	(Austria) Hugo Nindl
—	KB	1963	1963	(France) Guy Périllat	N/A	N/A
	DH	1964	1964	giant slalom was organized instead downhill		
—	DH	1965	1965	(Austria) Stefan Sodat	(Austria) Werner Bleiner	(Austria) Karl Schranz
—	KB	1965	1965	(Austria) Karl Schranz	N/A	N/A
—	DH	1966	1966	(Austria) Karl Schranz	(Switzerland) Josef Minsch	(Switzerland) Edmund Bruggmann
—	KB	1966	1966	(Austria) Karl Schranz	N/A	N/A
World Cup
4	DH	1967	14 January 1967	(France) Jean-Claude Killy	(France) Léo Lacroix	(Switzerland) Jean-Daniel Dätwyler
20	DH	1967/68	13 January 1968	(Austria) Gerhard Nenning	(Austria) Karl Schranz	(Switzerland) Edmund Bruggmann
41	DH	1968/69	11 January 1969	(Austria) Karl Schranz	(Austria) Heinrich Messner	(Austria) Karl Cordin
66	DH	1969/70	10 January 1970	(France) Henri Duvillard	(Austria) Karl Cordin	(Austria) Heinrich Messner
	DH	1970/71	16 January 1971	cancelled due to lack of snow; replaced in St. Moritz on 16 January 1971 (After agreement between both organisers, this was oficial Lauberhorn downhill)		
	DH	1971/72	22 January 1972	cancelled due to fog in upper part; rescheduled on next day		
	DH	1971/72	23 January 1972	rescheduled downhill finally cancelled; again due to fog in upper part		
	DH	1972/73	13 January 1973	cancelled due to lack of snow; replaced in nearby Grindelwald on 13 January 1973		
168	DH	1973/74	19 January 1974	(Switzerland) Roland Collombin	(Austria) Franz Klammer	(Italy) Herbert Plank
185	DH	1974/75	11 January 1975	(Austria) Franz Klammer	(Italy) Herbert Plank	(Norway) Erik Håker
187	KB	1974/75	11 January 1975; 12 January 1975	(Italy) Gustav Thöni	(Austria) David Zwilling	(Switzerland) Walter Tresch
213	DH	1975/76	9 January 1976	(Italy) Herbert Plank	(Austria) Franz Klammer	(Switzerland) Bernhard Russi
214	KB	1975/76	5 January 1976; 9 January 1976	(Switzerland) Walter Tresch	(Italy) Piero Gros	(Italy) Gustav Thöni
215	DH	1975/76	10 January 1976	(Austria) Franz Klammer	(Switzerland) Philippe Roux	(Canada) Jim Hunter
217	KB	1975/76	10 January 1976; 11 January 1976	(Austria) Franz Klammer	(Italy) Gustav Thöni	(Switzerland) Walter Tresch
243	DH	1976/77	22 January 1977	(Austria) Franz Klammer	(West Germany) Sepp Ferstl	(Switzerland) Bernhard Russi
245	KB	1976/77	22 January 1977; 23 January 1977	(Switzerland) Walter Tresch	(Italy) Gustav Thöni	(West Germany) Sepp Ferstl
	DH	1977/78	14 January 1978	cancelled and rescheduled due to lack of training to 16 January (due to lack of snow, heavy snowfall and storm before and on the race day)		
	DH	1977/78	16 January 1978	rescheduled DH finally cancelled due to bad weather conditions		
	KB	1977/78	15 January 1978; 16 January 1978	although slalom was held on 15 January; combined event was cancelled		
	DH	1978/79	13 January 1979	lack of snow; replaced on 14 January in Crans-Montana; (first replacement date on 13 January, but due to strong wind moved on the next day)		
	KB	1978/79	13 January 1979; 14 January 1979	lack of snow; KB replaced on 9 January (SL) and 14 January (DH) in Crans-Montana		
330	DH	1979/80	18 January 1980	(Canada) Ken Read	(Austria) Josef Walcher	(Austria) Peter Wirnsberger
331	DH	1979/80	19 January 1980	(Switzerland) Peter Müller	(Canada) Ken Read	(Canada) Steve Podborski
362	DH	1980/81	24 January 1981	(Switzerland) Toni Bürgler	(Austria) Harti Weirather	(Canada) Steve Podborski
	DH	1981/82	23 January 1982	interrupted, cancelled and rescheduled due to fog to the next day on 24 January		
397	DH	1981/82	24 January 1982	(Austria) Harti Weirather	(Austria) Erwin Resch	(Austria) Peter Wirnsberger
399	KB	1981/82	19 January 1982; 24 January 1982	(Switzerland) Pirmin Zurbriggen	(Czechoslovakia) Ivan Pacak	(Italy) Thomas Kemenater
	DH	1982/83	15 January 1983	cancelled due to heavy snowfall and wind; replaced in Kitzbühel on 21 January		
	SL	1982/83	16 January 1983	too much of fresh snow; replaced in Markstein on 11 February		
	KB	1982/83	15 January 1983; 16 January 1983	cancelled due too much of fresh snow; organisers were unable to remove it in time; replaced in Kitzbühel (DH) on 21 January and in Markstein (SL) on 11 February		
	DH	1983/84	14 January 1984	due to weather conditions downhill rescheduled on 15 January		
	KB	1983/84	14 January 1984; 15 January 1984	rescheduled to 15 and 17 January due to many programme delays and changes (As they moved the DH from Saturday to Sunday, they also moved cancelled Morzine's SL from Sunday to Monday; original Sunday Wengen's SL counted for KB was moved from Monday and again on Tuesday)		
464	DH	1983/84	15 January 1984	(United States) Bill Johnson	(Austria) Anton Steiner	(Austria) Erwin Resch
467	KB	1983/84	15 January 1984; 17 January 1984	(Liechtenstein) Andreas Wenzel	(Austria) Anton Steiner	(Switzerland) Peter Lüscher
506	DH	1984/85	18 January 1985	(Austria) Helmut Höflehner	(Switzerland) Franz Heinzer	(Austria) Peter Wirnsberger
	DH	1984/85	19 January 1985	cancelled due to fog; rescheduled on next day to 20 January; (and consequently both SL and KB were postponed for one day; from 20 to 21 January)		
507	DH	1984/85	20 January 1985	(Austria) Peter Wirnsberger	(Switzerland) Peter Lüscher	(Switzerland) Peter Müller
509	KB	1984/85	20 January 1985; 21 January 1985	(France) Michel Vion	(West Germany) Peter Roth	(Switzerland) Peter Lüscher
	DH	1985/86	31 January 1986	replacement for St. Anton was rescheduled to 1 February due to snow storm (because of too much snow on Saturday they didn't manage too remove it and finally cancelled it)		
	DH	1985/86	1 February 1986	planned to reschedule it on 2 February (SL day) but finally cancelled due to too much snow		
	KB	1985/86	1 February 1986; 2 February 1986	although SL was held; there was no combined event as original downhill was cancelled		
586	DH	1986/87	17 January 1987	(Germany) Markus Wasmeier	(Switzerland) Karl Alpiger	(Switzerland) Franz Heinzer
588	KB	1986/87	17 January 1987; 18 January 1987	(Switzerland) Pirmin Zurbriggen	only one skier ranked at combined event	
	DH	1987/88	27 January 1988	rescheduled in Leukerbad on 24 January due to bad weather		
	SG	1987/88	25 January 1988	rescheduled in Leukerbad on 25 January due to bad weather (interrupted after 78 of over 100 skiers due to snow and fog with official results)		
651	DH	1988/89	20 Januar 1989	(Luxembourg) Marc Girardelli	(West Germany) Markus Wasmeier	(Switzerland) Daniel Mahrer
652	DH	1988/89	21 January 1989	(Luxembourg) Marc Girardelli	(Switzerland) Pirmin Zurbriggen	(Switzerland) Daniel Mahrer
654	KB	1988/89	21 January 1989; 22 January 1989	(Luxembourg) Marc Girardelli	(Switzerland) Pirmin Zurbriggen	(West Germany) Markus Wasmeier
	DH	1989/90	27 January 1990	rescheduled in Val-d'Isère on 27 January; and then again on 29th as DH on 26th, a replacement for December's Val d'Isere's cancelled DH, was due to heavy snowfall rescheduled on 27th. That's why Wengen's DH was rescheduled on 29th		
	SG	1989/90	28 January 1990	rescheduled in Val-d'Isère on 28 January; and then again on 29th due to bad weather		
	DH	1990/91	19 January 1991	all races that weekend were cancelled after fatal accident in Ziel-S of Austrian skier Gernot Reinstadler at the downhill training on 18 January 1991		
	KB	1990/91	19 January 1991; 20 January 1991	all races that weekend were cancelled after fatal accident in Ziel-S of Austrian skier Gernot Reinstadler at the downhill training on 18 January 1991		
747	DH	1991/92	25 January 1992	(Switzerland) Franz Heinzer	(Germany) Markus Wasmeier	(Austria) Helmut Höflehner
749	KB	1991/92	25 January 1992; 26 January 1992	(Switzerland) Paul Accola	(Austria) Günther Mader	(Austria) Hubert Strolz
	DH	1992/93	23 January 1993	lack of snow; rescheduled in Veysonnaz on 23 and 24 January		
	KB	1992/93	23 January 1993; 24 January 1993	lack of snow; rescheduled in Veysonnaz on 23 and 24 January		
815	DH	1993/94	22 January 1994	(Switzerland) William Besse	(Luxembourg) Marc Girardelli (Italy) Peter Runggaldier	
816	SG	1993/94	23 January 1994	(Switzerland) Marc Girardelli	(Luxembourg) Jan Einar Thorsen	(Italy) Atle Skårdal
846	DH	1994/95	20 January 1995	(Italy) Kristian Ghedina	(Austria) Peter Rzehak	(Austria) Hannes Trinkl
847	DH	1994/95	21 January 1995	(United States) Kyle Rasmussen	(Austria) Werner Franz	(Austria) Armin Assinger
849	KB	1994/95	21 January 1995; 22 January 1995	(Luxembourg) Marc Girardelli	(Norway) Lasse Kjus	(Norway) Harald Strand Nilsen
	DH	1995/96	19 January 1996	lack of snow; replaced in Veysonnaz on 19 January		
	DH	1995/96	20 January 1996	lack of snow; replaced in Veysonnaz on 20 January		
	KB	1995/96	20 January 1996; 21 January 1996	lack of snow; replaced in Veysonnaz on 20 and 21 January		
914	DH	1996/97	18 January 1997	(Italy) Kristian Ghedina	(France) Luc Alphand	(Austria) Fritz Strobl
952	DH	1997/98	16 January 1998	(Austria) Hermann Maier	(France) Nicolas Burtin	(Austria) Andreas Schifferer
953	DH	1997/98	17 January 1998	(Austria) Andreas Schifferer	(France) Jean-Luc Crétier	(Austria) Hermann Maier
955	KB	1997/98	16 January 1998; 18 January 1998	(Austria) Hermann Maier	(Switzerland) Bruno Kernen	(Switzerland) Paul Accola
989	DH	1998/99	16 January 1999	(Norway) Lasse Kjus	(Austria) Hannes Trinkl	(Austria) Hans Knauß
991	KB	1998/99	16 January 1999; 17 January 1999	(Norway) Lasse Kjus	(Norway) Kjetil André Aamodt	(Austria) Hermann Maier
1021	DH	1999/00	15 January 2000	(Austria) Josef Strobl	(Austria) Hermann Maier	(Canada) Ed Podivinsky
	DH	2000/01	13 January 2001	cancelled; replaced in Kvitfjell on 2 March 2001		
	KB	2000/01	13 January 2001; 14 January 2001	although SL was held; there was no combined event as original downhill was cancelled		
1095	DH	2001/02	12 January 2002	(Austria) Stephan Eberharter	(Austria) Hannes Trinkl	(Austria) Josef Strobl
1097	KB	2001/02	12 January 2002; 13 January 2002	(Norway) Kjetil André Aamodt	(United States) Bode Miller	(Norway) Lasse Kjus
1132	DH	2002/03	17 January 2003	(Austria) Stephan Eberharter	(United States) Daron Rahlves	(Switzerland) Bruno Kernen
1133	DH	2002/03	18 January 2003	(Switzerland) Bruno Kernen	(Austria) Michael Walchhofer	(Austria) Stephan Eberharter
1135	KB	2002/03	18 January 2003; 19 January 2003	(Norway) Kjetil André Aamodt	(United States) Bode Miller	(Norway) Lasse Kjus
	DH	2003/04	16 January 2004	replacement for Bormio's DH cancelled due to heavy snowfall; (then finally rescheduled in Kitzbühel on 22 January 2004)		
	DH	2003/04	17 January 2004	another cancelled DH due to heavy snowfall; (finally rescheduled in Ga-Pa on 30 January 2004)		
	KB	2003/04	17 January 2004; 18 January 2004	although SL was held; there was no KB event as original DH was cancelled		
1208	SC	2004/05	14 January 2005	(Austria) Benjamin Raich	(Norway) Lasse Kjus	(Switzerland) Didier Défago
1209	DH	2004/05	15 January 2005	(Austria) Michael Walchhofer	(Austria) Christoph Gruber	(United States) Bode Miller
1243	SC	2005/06	13 January 2006	(Austria) Benjamin Raich	(Norway) Kjetil André Aamodt	(Italy) Peter Fill
1244	DH	2005/06	14 January 2006	(United States) Daron Rahlves	(Austria) Michael Walchhofer	(Austria) Fritz Strobl
	SC	2006/07	12 January 2007	rain and high temperatures; rescheduled in Wengen on 14 January 2007		
1280	DH	2006/07	13 January 2007	(United States) Bode Miller	(Switzerland) Didier Cuche	(Italy) Peter Fill
1281	SC	2006/07	14 January 2007	(Austria) Mario Matt	(Switzerland) Marc Berthod	(Switzerland) Silvan Zurbriggen
1315	SC	2007/08	11 January 2008	(France) Jean-Baptiste Grange	(Switzerland) Daniel Albrecht	(United States) Bode Miller
	DH	2007/08	12 January 2008	rescheduled on 13 January due to heavy snow; programme switched with SL		
1317	DH	2007/08	13 January 2008	(United States) Bode Miller	(Switzerland) Didier Cuche	(Canada) Manuel Osborne-Paradis
1355	SC	2008/09	16 January 2009	(Austria) Klaus Kröll	(Norway) Aksel Lund Svindal	(Switzerland) Ambrosi Hoffmann
1356	DH	2008/09	17 January 2009	(Switzerland) Didier Défago	(United States) Bode Miller	(United States) Marco Sullivan
1391	SC	2009/10	15 January 2010	(United States) Bode Miller	(Switzerland) Carlo Janka	(Switzerland) Silvan Zurbriggen
1392	DH	2009/10	16 January 2010	(Switzerland) Carlo Janka	(Canada) Manuel Osborne-Paradis	(Liechtenstein) Marco Büchel
1423	SC	2010/11	14 January 2011	(Croatia) Ivica Kostelić	(Switzerland) Carlo Janka	(Norway) Aksel Lund Svindal
1424	DH	2010/11	15 January 2011	(Austria) Klaus Kröll	(Switzerland) Didier Cuche	(Switzerland) Carlo Janka
1460	SC	2011/12	13 January 2012	(Croatia) Ivica Kostelić	(Switzerland) Beat Feuz	(United States) Bode Miller
1461	DH	2011/12	14 January 2012	(Switzerland) Beat Feuz	(Austria) Hannes Reichelt	(Italy) Christof Innerhofer
1506	SC	2012/13	18 January 2013	(France) Alexis Pinturault	(Croatia) Ivica Kostelić	(Switzerland) Carlo Janka
1507	DH	2012/13	19 January 2013	(Italy) Christof Innerhofer	(Austria) Klaus Kröll	(Austria) Hannes Reichelt
1538	SC	2013/14	17 January 2014	(United States) Ted Ligety	(France) Alexis Pinturault	(Croatia) Natko Zrnčić-Dim
1539	DH	2013/14	18 January 2014	(Switzerland) Patrick Küng	(Austria) Hannes Reichelt	(Norway) Aksel Lund Svindal
1573	AC	2014/15	16 January 2015	(Switzerland) Carlo Janka	(France) Victor Muffat-Jeandet	(Croatia) Ivica Kostelić
	DH	2014/15	17 January 2015	switched schedule with SL due to heavy snow; moved to 18 January		
1575	DH	2014/15	18 January 2015	(Austria) Hannes Reichelt	(Switzerland) Beat Feuz	(Switzerland) Carlo Janka
1609	AC	2015/16	15 January 2016	(Norway) Kjetil Jansrud	(Norway) Aksel Lund Svindal	(France) Adrien Théaux
1610	DH	2015/16	16 January 2016	(Norway) Aksel Lund Svindal	(Austria) Hannes Reichelt	(Austria) Klaus Kröll
1654	AC	2016/17	13 January 2017	(Switzerland) Niels Hintermann	(France) Maxence Muzaton	(Austria) Frederic Berthold
	DH	2016/17	14 January 2017	cancelled; replaced in Garmisch-Partenkirchen on 27 January 2017		
1692	AC	2017/18	12 January 2018	(France) Victor Muffat-Jeandet	(Russia) Pavel Trikhichev	(Italy) Peter Fill
1693	DH	2017/18	13 January 2018	(Switzerland) Beat Feuz	(Norway) Aksel Lund Svindal	(Austria) Matthias Mayer
1729	AC	2018/19	18 January 2019	(Austria) Marco Schwarz	(France) Victor Muffat-Jeandet	(France) Alexis Pinturault
1730	DH	2018/19	19 January 2019	(Austria) Vincent Kriechmayr	(Switzerland) Beat Feuz	(Norway) Aleksander Aamodt Kilde
1765	AC	2019/20	17 January 2020	(Austria) Matthias Mayer	(France) Alexis Pinturault	(France) Victor Muffat-Jeandet
1766	DH	2019/20	18 January 2020	(Switzerland) Beat Feuz	(Italy) Dominik Paris	(Germany) Thomas Dreßen
	DH	2020/21	15 January 2021	cancelled due to COVID-19; replaced in Saalbach-Hinterglemm on 5 March 2021		
	DH	2020/21	16 January 2021	cancelled due to COVID-19; replaced in Kitzbühel on 22 January 2021		
1835	SG	2021/22	13 January 2022	(Switzerland) Marco Odermatt	(Norway) Aleksander Aamodt Kilde	(Austria) Matthias Mayer
1836	DH	2021/22	14 January 2022	(Norway) Aleksander Aamodt Kilde	(Switzerland) Marco Odermatt	(Switzerland) Beat Feuz
1837	DH	2021/22	15 January 2022	(Austria) Vincent Kriechmayr	(Switzerland) Beat Feuz	(Italy) Dominik Paris
1872	SG	2022/23	13 January 2023	(Norway) Aleksander Aamodt Kilde	(Switzerland) Stefan Rogentin	(Switzerland) Marco Odermatt
1873	DH	2022/23	14 January 2023	(Norway) Aleksander Aamodt Kilde	(Switzerland) Marco Odermatt	(Italy) Mattia Casse
1905	DH	2023/24	11 January 2024	(Switzerland) Marco Odermatt	(France) Cyprien Sarrazin	(Norway) Aleksander Aamodt Kilde
1906	SG	2023/24	12 January 2024	(France) Cyprien Sarrazin	(Switzerland) Marco Odermatt	(Norway) Aleksander Aamodt Kilde
1907	DH	2023/24	13 January 2024	(Switzerland) Marco Odermatt	(France) Cyprien Sarrazin	(Italy) Dominik Paris
1945	SG	2024/25	17 January 2025	(Switzerland) Franjo von Allmen	(Austria) Vincent Kriechmayr	(Switzerland) Stefan Rogentin
1946	DH	2024/25	18 January 2025	(Switzerland) Marco Odermatt	(Switzerland) Franjo von Allmen	(Slovenia) Miha Hrobat
1984	SG	2025/26	16 January 2026	(Italy) Giovanni Franzoni	(Austria) Stefan Babinsky	(Switzerland) Franjo von Allmen
1985	DH	2025/26	17 January 2026	(Switzerland) Marco Odermatt	(Austria) Vincent Kriechmayr	(Italy) Giovanni Franzoni

Replacement for; Schladming (1980), Bormio (1985, 2022), Ga-Pa/Laax (1989), Ga-Pa/C.-Montana (1995), V. Gardena (1998) and B. Creek (2024).
Combined shared with other venues: Garmisch-Partenkirchen (1976), Adelboden (1982), Parpan (1984) and Veysonnaz (1998).

=== Most downhill wins ===
Wins	Athlete	Years
6	(Switzerland) Karl Molitor	1939, 1940, 1942, 1943, 1945, 1947
4	(Austria) Toni Sailer	1955, 1956, 1957, 1958
4	(Austria) Karl Schranz	1959, 1963, 1966, 1969
4	(Switzerland) Marco Odermatt	2024, 2024, 2025, 2026
3	(Switzerland) Rudolf Graf	1941, 1944, 1949
3	(Austria) Franz Klammer	1975, 1976, 1977
3	(Switzerland) Beat Feuz	2012, 2018, 2020
2	(Switzerland) Fritz Steuri	1931, 1932
2	(Switzerland) Heinz von Allmen	1937, 1938
2	(Austria) Othmar Schneider	1951, 1952
2	(Luxembourg) Marc Girardelli	1989, 1989
2	(Italy) Kristian Ghedina	1995, 1997
2	(Austria) Stephan Eberharter	2002, 2003
2	(United States) Bode Miller	2007, 2008
2	(Austria) Vincent Kriechmayr	2019, 2022
2	(Norway) Aleksander Aamodt Kilde	2022, 2023

== Club5+ ==
In 1986, elite Club5 was originally founded by prestigious classic downhill organizers: Kitzbühel, Wengen, Garmisch, Val d’Isère and Val Gardena/Gröden, with goal to bring alpine ski sport on the highest levels possible.

Later over the years other classic longterm organizers joined the now named Club5+: Alta Badia, Cortina, Kranjska Gora, Maribor, Lake Louise, Schladming, Adelboden, Kvitfjell, St.Moritz and Åre.
