= Männlichen (ski course) =

Swiss slalom ski course

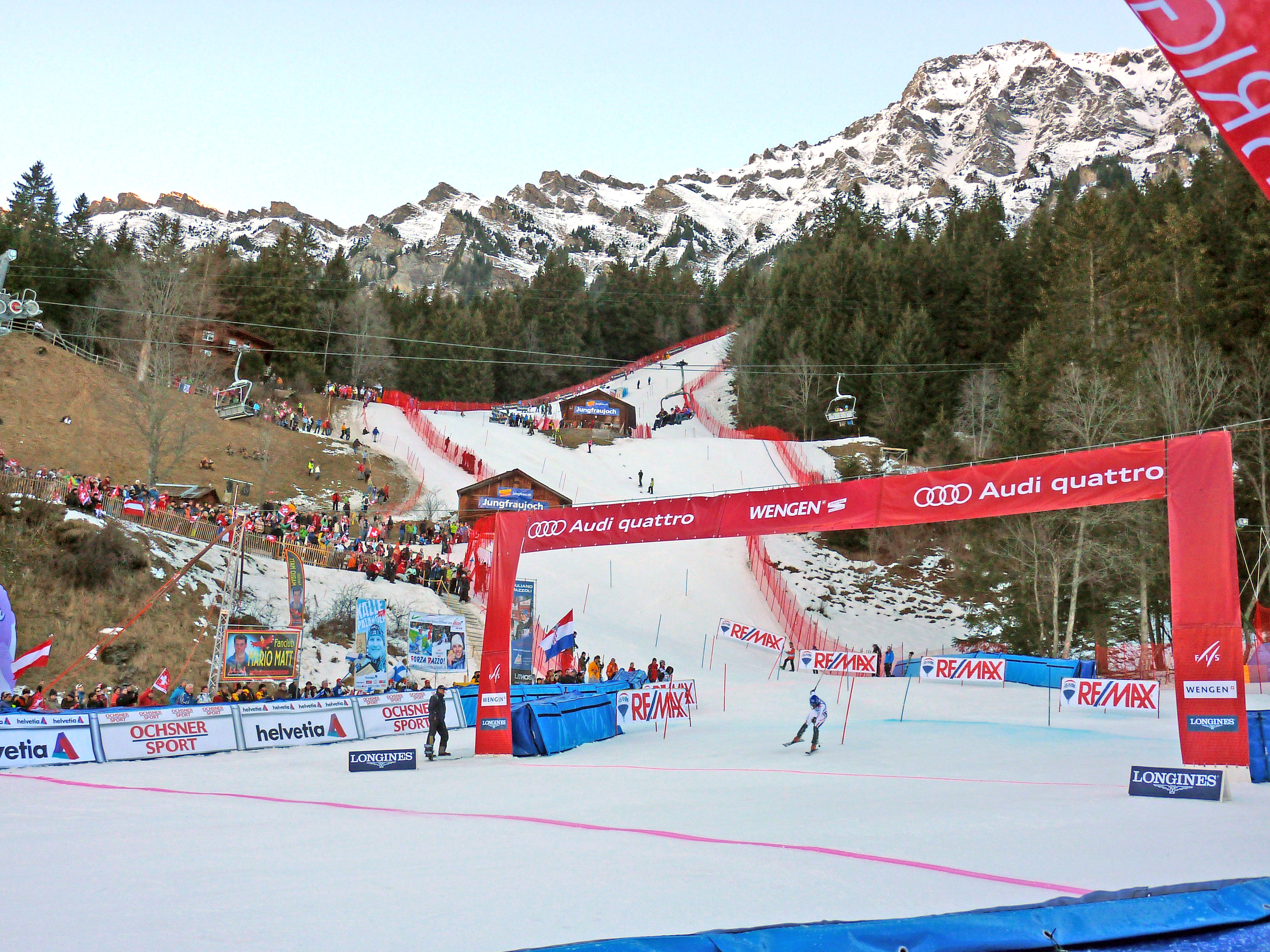
- Finish area in January 2011
- Interactive map of Männlichen
- Location within Switzerland Location within Alps Location within Europe
- 46°35′38″N 7°55′27″E
- Location: Wengen, Switzerland
- Mountain: Lauberhorn
- Opened: 1930; 96 years ago
- Member: Club5+
- Level: expert
- Competition: Lauberhornrennen

Slalom
- Start: 1,475 m (4,839 ft) (AA)
- Finish: 1,285 m (4,216 ft)
- Vertical drop: 190 m (623 ft)
- Max incline: 35.8 degrees (72%)
- Avg incline: 17.2 degrees (31%)
- Min incline: 1.1 degrees (2%)
- Most Wins (M): (Croatia) Ivica Kostelić (4x)

Männlichen is a classic men's World Cup slalom ski course in Wengen, Switzerland. Located in the Bernese Alps on Lauberhorn mountain, the course made its debut in 1930.

It is the oldest active alpine ski racing course in the world and part of the Lauberhornrennen, the oldest ski competition in the world.

As Switzerland is militarily neutral, alpine competitions were held during World War II.

Männlichen shares a common finish area with "Lauberhorn", Wengen's famous downhill course.

The course runs on natural terrain (pasture in summer), and is used only for World Cup events; its vertical drop is 190 metres (623 ft).

== Official course name ==
In 2020, the name of the course was officially changed (shortened) from "Männlichen / Jungfrau" to "Männlichen" only. It is named after the mountain of the same name in the surrounding area.

== (pre)World Cup ==
Ivica Kostelić (CRO)	The slope
300x	300x
Won record 4 slaloms	Lower section

=== Men ===
No.	Type	Season	Date	Winner	Second	Third
International Lauberhorrenen
—	SL	1930	1930	(Switzerland) Ernst Gertsch	(United Kingdom) Bill Bracken	(Austria) Harald Reinl
—	KB	1930	1930	(United Kingdom) Bill Bracken	N/A	N/A
—	SL	1931	1931	(Switzerland) Hans Schlunegger	(Switzerland) Ernst von Allmen	(Switzerland) Willy Steuri
—	KB	1931	1931	(Switzerland) Fritz Steuri	N/A	N/A
—	SL	1932	1932	(Switzerland) Fritz von Allmen	(United Kingdom) Peter Lun	(Switzerland) Ernst Gertsch
—	KB	1932	1932	(Switzerland) Fritz Steuri	N/A	N/A
In 1933 it was the only time in the history of Lauberhornrennen when competition wasn't organized
—	SL	1934	1934	(Switzerland) Adolf Rubi	(Switzerland) Ernst von Allmen	(Switzerland) Arnold Glatthard
—	KB	1934	1934	(Switzerland) Adolf Rubi	N/A	N/A
—	SL	1935	1935	(Switzerland) Arnold Glatthard	(Switzerland) Willy Steuri	(France) Raymond Berthet
—	KB	1935	1935	(Switzerland) Hans Rubi	N/A	N/A
—	SL	1936	1936	(Switzerland) Hermann Steuri	(Switzerland) Arnold Glatthard	(Austria) Wilhelm Walch
—	KB	1936	1936	(France) Émile Allais	N/A	N/A
—	SL	1937	1937	(Austria) Wilhelm Walch	(Switzerland) Hans Schlunegger	(Switzerland) Heinz von Allmen
—	KB	1937	1937	(Austria) Wilhelm Walch	N/A	N/A
—	SL	1938	1938	(Nazi Germany) Rudolf Cranz	(Austria) Wilhelm Walch	(Switzerland) Heinz von Allmen
—	KB	1938	1938	(Switzerland) Heinz von Allmen	N/A	N/A
—	SL	1939	1939	(Nazi Germany) Josef Jennewein	(Nazi Germany) Wilhelm Walch	(Nazi Germany) Joseph Pertsch
—	KB	1939	1939	(Nazi Germany) Wilhelm Walch	N/A	N/A
—	SL	1940	1940	(Switzerland) Karl Molitor	(Switzerland) Hans Gertsch	(Switzerland) Jean Dormond
—	KB	1940	1940	(Switzerland) Karl Molitor	N/A	N/A
—	SL	1941	1941	(Switzerland) Marcel von Allmen	(Switzerland) Karl Molitor	(Switzerland) Otto von Allmen
—	KB	1941	1941	(Switzerland) Marcel von Allmen	N/A	N/A
—	SL	1942	1942	(Switzerland) Heinz von Allmen	(Switzerland) Albert Scheuing	(Switzerland) Bruno Rota
—	KB	1942	1942	(Switzerland) Heinz von Allmen	N/A	N/A
—	SL	1943	1943	(Switzerland) Heinz von Allmen	(Sweden) Hans Hansson	(Switzerland) Marcel von Allmen
—	KB	1943	1943	(Switzerland) Heinz von Allmen	N/A	N/A
—	SL	1944	1944	(Switzerland) Marcel von Allmen	(Switzerland) Hans Gertsch	(Switzerland) Fred Rubi
—	KB	1944	1944	(Switzerland) Marcel von Allmen	N/A	N/A
—	SL	1945	1945	(Switzerland) Otto von Allmen	(Switzerland) Karl Molitor	(Switzerland) Walter Haensli
—	KB	1945	1945	(Switzerland) Otto von Allmen	N/A	N/A
—	SL	1946	1946	(Switzerland) Otto von Allmen	(France) James Couttet	(Switzerland) Karl Molitor
—	KB	1946	1946	(Switzerland) Karl Molitor	N/A	N/A
—	SL	1947	1947	(Sweden) Olle Dalman	(France) James Couttet	(Italy) Zeno Colò
—	KB	1947	1947	(Switzerland) Edy Rominger	N/A	N/A
—	SL	1948	1948	(Switzerland) Karl Molitor	(Italy) Zeno Colò	(Italy) Roberto Lacedelli
—	KB	1948	1948	(Switzerland) Karl Molitor	N/A	N/A
—	SL	1949	1949	(Italy) Zeno Colò	(Switzerland) Fernand Grosjean	(Switzerland) Adolf Odermatt
—	KB	1949	1949	(Switzerland) Adolf Odermatt	N/A	N/A
—	SL	1950	1950	(Italy) Zeno Colò	(Switzerland) Fernand Grosjean	(Switzerland) Adolf Odermatt
—	KB	1950	1950	(Switzerland) Fred Rubi	N/A	N/A
—	SL	1951	1951	(Norway) Stein Eriksen	(Switzerland) Georges Schneider	(France) James Couttet
—	KB	1951	1951	(Austria) Othmar Schneider	N/A	N/A
—	SL	1952	1952	(Norway) Stein Eriksen	(Switzerland) Georges Schneider	(Switzerland) Fred Rubi
—	KB	1952	1952	(Austria) Othmar Schneider	N/A	N/A
FIS–A
—	SL	1953	1953	(Austria) Andreas Molterer	(West Germany) Benedikt Obermüller	(Switzerland) Louis Perret
—	KB	1953	1953	(Austria) Andreas Molterer	N/A	N/A
—	SL	1954	1954	(Austria) Toni Spiss	(Austria) Walter Schuster	(Switzerland) Louis Perret
—	KB	1954	1954	(Austria) Christian Pravda	N/A	N/A
—	SL	1955	1955	(Switzerland) Martin Julen	(France) Bernard Perret	(France) Adrien Duvillard
—	KB	1955	1955	(Austria) Toni Sailer	N/A	N/A
—	SL	1956	1956	(Austria) Andreas Molterer	(Austria) Josef Rieder	(Austria) Toni Sailer
—	KB	1956	1956	(Austria) Josef Rieder	N/A	N/A
—	SL	1957	1957	(Austria) Andreas Molterer	(Austria) Ernst Hinterseer	(Austria) Josef Rieder
—	KB	1957	1957	(Austria) Josef Rieder	N/A	N/A
—	SL	1958	1958	(Austria) Josef Rieder	(Austria) Mathias Leitner	(United States) Wallace Werner
—	KB	1958	1958	(United States) Wallace Werner	N/A	N/A
—	SL	1959	1959	(Austria) Ernst Oberaigner	(Austria) Mathias Leitner	(Switzerland) Roger Staub
—	KB	1959	1959	(Austria) Ernst Oberaigner	N/A	N/A
—	SL	1960	1960	(Austria) Mathias Leitner	(Austria) Josef Stiegler	(Austria) Ernst Hinterseer
—	KB	1960	1960	(Austria) Josef Stiegler	N/A	N/A
—	SL	1961	1961	(Austria) Josef Stiegler	(Switzerland) Adolf Mathis	(France) Charles Bozon
—	KB	1961	1961	(France) Guy Périllat	N/A	N/A
—	SL	1962	1962	(Switzerland) Adolf Mathis	(France) Charles Bozon	(Austria) Martin Burger
	KB	1962	1962	downhill cancelled and consequently also combined event		
—	SL	1963	1963	(France) Guy Périllat	(Austria) Martin Burger	(Austria) Egon Zimmermann
—	KB	1963	1963	(France) Guy Périllat	N/A	N/A
—	SL	1964	1964	(West Germany) Ludwig Leitner	(Austria) Mathias Leitner	(Austria) Karl Schranz
—	SL	1965	1965	(France) Guy Périllat	(France) Jean-Claude Killy	(Norway) Per Sunde
—	KB	1965	1965	(Austria) Karl Schranz	N/A	N/A
—	SL	1966	1966	(France) Guy Périllat	(France) Jules Melquiond	(Austria) Franz Digruber
—	KB	1966	1966	(Austria) Karl Schranz	N/A	N/A
World Cup
5	SL	1967	15 January 1967	(France) Jean-Claude Killy	(Austria) Heinrich Messner	(France) Jules Melquiond
21	SL	1967/68	14 January 1968	(Switzerland) Dumeng Giovanoli	(Norway) Håkon Mjøen	(Austria) Alfred Matt
42	SL	1968/69	12 January 1969	(Austria) Reinhard Tritscher	(United States) Vladimir Sabich	(Austria) Peter Frei
67	SL	1969/70	11 January 1970	(France) Patrick Russel	(Switzerland) Dumeng Giovanoli	(France) Henri Bréchu
	SL	1970/71	17 January 1971	lack of snow; replaced on 17 January 1971 in St. Moritz		
121	SL	1971/72	23 January 1972	(France) Jean-Noël Augert	(Italy) Gustav Thöni	(United States) Bob Cochran
141	SL	1972/73	14 January 1973	(West Germany) Christian Neureuther	(Switzerland) Walter Tresch	(France) Claude Perrot
169	SL	1973/74	20 January 1974	(West Germany) Christian Neureuther	(Italy) Fausto Radici	(Austria) David Zwilling
186	SL	1974/75	12 January 1975	(Sweden) Ingemar Stenmark	(Italy) Piero Gros	(Italy) Paolo De Chiesa
187	KB	1974/75	11 January 1975; 12 January 1975	(Italy) Gustav Thöni	(Austria) David Zwilling	(Switzerland) Walter Tresch
214	KB	1975/76	5 January 1976; 9 January 1976	(Switzerland) Walter Tresch	(Italy) Piero Gros	(Italy) Gustav Thöni
216	SL	1975/76	11 January 1976	(Sweden) Ingemar Stenmark	(Italy) Piero Gros	(West Germany) Christian Neureuther
217	KB	1975/76	10 January 1976; 11 January 1976	(Austria) Franz Klammer	(Italy) Gustav Thöni	(Switzerland) Walter Tresch
244	SL	1976/77	23 January 1977	(Sweden) Ingemar Stenmark	(Liechtenstein) Paul Frommelt	(Switzerland) Walter Tresch
245	KB	1976/77	22 January 1977; 23 January 1977	(Switzerland) Walter Tresch	(Italy) Gustav Thöni	(West Germany) Sepp Ferstl
272	SL	1977/78	15 January 1978	(Austria) Klaus Heidegger	(Bulgaria) Petăr Popangelov	(Italy) Mauro Bernardi
	KB	1977/78	15 January 1978; 16 January 1978	DH rescheduled due to lack of training from 14 to 16 January (DH and KB finally cancelled; lack of and heavy snowfall, storm before and on the race day)		
	SL	1978/79	14 January 1979	lack of snow; replaced on 9 January 1979 in Crans-Montana		
	KB	1978/79	13 January 1979; 14 January 1979	lack of snow; KB replaced on 9 January (SL) and 14 January (DH) in Crans-Montana		
332	SL	1979/80	20 January 1980	(Socialist Federal Republic of Yugoslavia) Bojan Križaj	(Sweden) Ingemar Stenmark	(Liechtenstein) Paul Frommelt
363	SL	1980/81	25 January 1981	(Socialist Federal Republic of Yugoslavia) Bojan Križaj	(Luxembourg) Marc Girardelli	(Sweden) Ingemar Stenmark
398	SL	1981/82	24 January 1982	(United States) Phil Mahre	(Sweden) Ingemar Stenmark	(Liechtenstein) Paul Frommelt
399	KB	1981/82	19 January 1982; 24 January 1982	(Austria) Pirmin Zurbriggen	(Czechoslovakia) Ivan Pacak	(Italy) Thomas Kemenater
	SL	1982/83	15 January 1983	exceptionally to be raced on part of the Lauberhorn course; (But due to too much of fresh snow replaced on 11 February 1983 in Markstein)		
	SL	1983/84	15 January 1984	weather; replaced on 17 January 1984 in Parpan, counted with Wengen for KB		
	KB	1983/84	14 January 1984; 15 January 1984	rescheduled to 15 and 17 January due to many programm changes; (As they moved the DH from Saturday to Sunday, they also moved cancelledMorzine's SL from Sunday to Monday; original Sunday Wengen's SL counted for KB was moved from Monday and again on Tuesday)		
467	KB	1983/84	15 January 1984; 17 January 1984	Wengen's DH (15th) and replaced Parpan's SL (17th) together counted for KB		
	KB	1984/85	19 January 1985; 20 January 1985	DH cancelled due to fog and rescheduled on next day to 20 January; (and consequently both SL and KB were postponed from 20 to 21 January)		
508	SL	1984/85	21 January 1985	(Luxembourg) Marc Girardelli	(Sweden) Ingemar Stenmark	(Liechtenstein) Paul Frommelt
509	KB	1984/85	20 January 1985; 21 January 1985	(France) Michel Vion	(West Germany) Peter Roth	(Switzerland) Peter Lüscher
544	SL	1985/86	2 February 1986	(Socialist Federal Republic of Yugoslavia) Rok Petrovič	(France) Didier Bouvet	(Socialist Federal Republic of Yugoslavia) Bojan Križaj
	KB	1985/86	1 February 1986; 2 February 1986	although SL was held; there was no combined event as downhill was cancelled		
587	SL	1986/87	18 January 1987	(Switzerland) Joël Gaspoz	(Austria) Dietmar Köhlbichler	(Socialist Federal Republic of Yugoslavia) Bojan Križaj
588	KB	1986/87	17 January 1987; 18 January 1987	(Switzerland) Pirmin Zurbriggen	only one skier ranked at combined event	
In 1987/88 SL wasn't on calendar; only DH and SG were organised
653	SL	1988/89	21 January 1989	(Austria) Rudolf Nierlich	(Italy) Alberto Tomba	(Austria) Hubert Strolz
654	KB	1988/89	21 January 1989; 22 January 1989	(Luxembourg) Marc Girardelli	(Switzerland) Pirmin Zurbriggen	(West Germany) Markus Wasmeier
In 1989/90 SL wasn't on calendar; only DH and SG were organised; but rescheduled to Val d'Isere on 29 January
	SL	1990/91	20 January 1991	all cancelled after fatal crash of Gernot Reinstadler at training on 18 January		
	KB	1990/91	19 January 1991; 20 January 1991	all cancelled after fatal crash of Gernot Reinstadler at training on 18 January		
748	SL	1991/92	26 January 1992	(Italy) Alberto Tomba	(Switzerland) Paul Accola	(Germany) Armin Bittner
749	KB	1991/92	25 January 1992; 26 January 1992	(Luxembourg) Paul Accola	(Austria) Günther Mader	(Austria) Hubert Strolz
	SL	1992/93	24 January 1993	lack of snow; replaced in Veysonnaz on 24 January		
	KB	1992/93	23 January 1993; 24 January 1993	lack of snow; replaced in Veysonnaz on 23 and 24 January		
In 1993/94 SL wasn't on calendar; only DH and SG were organised
848	SL	1994/95	22 January 1995	(Italy) Alberto Tomba	(Switzerland) Michael von Grünigen	(Slovenia) Jure Košir
849	KB	1994/95	21 January 1995; 22 January 1995	(Luxembourg) Marc Girardelli	(Norway) Lasse Kjus	(Norway) Harald Strand Nilsen
	SL	1995/96	21 January 1996	lack of snow; replaced in Veysonnaz on 21 January		
	KB	1995/96	20 January 1996; 21 January 1996	lack of snow; replaced in Veysonnaz on 20 and 21 January		
915	SL	1996/97	19 January 1997	(Austria) Thomas Sykora	(Austria) Thomas Stangassinger	(France) Sébastien Amiez
	SL	1997/98	18 January 1998	replaced on 18 January 1996 in Veysonnaz		
	KB	1997/98	16 January 1998; 18 January 1998	Veysonnaz's SL counted for KB together with Wengen's DH on 16 January		
990	SL	1998/99	17 January 1999	(Austria) Benjamin Raich	(Switzerland) Michael von Grünigen	(Norway) Lasse Kjus
991	KB	1998/99	16 January 1999; 17 January 1999	(Norway) Lasse Kjus	(Norway) Kjetil André Aamodt	(Austria) Hermann Maier
1022	SL	1999/00	16 January 2000	(Norway) Kjetil André Aamodt	(Norway) Ole Kristian Furuseth	(Slovenia) Drago Grubelnik
1061	SL	2000/01	14 January 2001	(Austria) Benjamin Raich	(Austria) Rainer Schönfelder	(Austria) Mario Matt
	KB	2000/01	13 January 2001; 14 January 2001	although SL was held; there was no combined event as original downhill was cancelled		
1096	SL	2001/02	13 January 2002	(Croatia) Ivica Kostelić	(Slovenia) Mitja Kunc	(Italy) Edoardo Zardini
1097	KB	2001/02	12 January 2002; 13 January 2002	(Norway) Kjetil André Aamodt	(United States) Bode Miller	(Norway) Lasse Kjus
1134	SL	2002/03	19 January 2003	(Italy) Giorgio Rocca	(Japan) Akira Sasaki	(Croatia) Ivica Kostelić
1135	KB	2002/03	18 January 2003; 19 January 2003	(Norway) Kjetil André Aamodt	(United States) Bode Miller	(Norway) Lasse Kjus
1168	SL	2003/04	18 January 2004	(Austria) Benjamin Raich	(Austria) Rainer Schönfelder	(Croatia) Ivica Kostelić
	KB	2003/04	17 January 2004; 18 January 2004	there was no KB event as DH was cancelled and rescheduled to Ga-Pa		
1208	SC	2004/05	14 January 2005	(Austria) Benjamin Raich	(Norway) Lasse Kjus	(Switzerland) Didier Défago
1210	SL	2004/05	16 January 2005	(Germany) Alois Vogl	(Croatia) Ivica Kostelić	(Austria) Benjamin Raich
1243	SC	2005/06	13 January 2006	(Austria) Benjamin Raich	(Norway) Kjetil André Aamodt	(Italy) Peter Fill
1245	SL	2005/06	15 January 2006	(Italy) Giorgio Rocca	(Finland) Kalle Palander	(Germany) Alois Vogl
	SC	2006/07	12 January 2007	rain and high temperatures; rescheduled in Wengen on 14 January 2007		
	SL	2006/07	14 January 2007	cancelled; replaced on 27 January 2007 in Kitzbühel		
1281	SC	2006/07	14 January 2007	(Austria) Mario Matt	(Switzerland) Marc Berthod	(Switzerland) Silvan Zurbriggen
1315	SC	2007/08	11 January 2008	(France) Jean-Baptiste Grange	(Switzerland) Daniel Albrecht	(United States) Bode Miller
1316	SL	2007/08	12 January 2008	(France) Jean-Baptiste Grange	(Sweden) Jens Byggmark	(United States) Ted Ligety
	SL	2007/08	13 January 2008	rescheduled on 12 January due to heavy snow; programme switched with DH		
1355	SC	2008/09	16 January 2009	(Switzerland) Carlo Janka	(Italy) Peter Fill	(Switzerland) Silvan Zurbriggen
1357	SL	2008/09	18 January 2009	(Austria) Manfred Pranger	(Austria) Reinfried Herbst	(Croatia) Ivica Kostelić
1391	SC	2009/10	15 January 2010	(United States) Bode Miller	(Switzerland) Carlo Janka	(Switzerland) Silvan Zurbriggen
1393	SL	2009/10	17 January 2010	(Croatia) Ivica Kostelić	(Sweden) André Myhrer	(Austria) Reinfried Herbst
1423	SC	2010/11	14 January 2011	(Croatia) Ivica Kostelić	(Switzerland) Carlo Janka	(Norway) Aksel Lund Svindal
1425	SL	2010/11	16 January 2011	(Croatia) Ivica Kostelić	(Austria) Marcel Hirscher	(France) Jean-Baptiste Grange
1460	SC	2011/12	13 January 2012	(Croatia) Ivica Kostelić	(Switzerland) Beat Feuz	(United States) Bode Miller
1462	SL	2011/12	15 January 2012	(Croatia) Ivica Kostelić	(Sweden) André Myhrer	(Germany) Fritz Dopfer
1506	SC	2012/13	18 January 2013	(France) Alexis Pinturault	(Croatia) Ivica Kostelić	(Switzerland) Carlo Janka
1508	SL	2012/13	20 January 2013	(Germany) Felix Neureuther	(Austria) Marcel Hirscher	(Croatia) Ivica Kostelić
1538	SC	2013/14	17 January 2014	(United States) Ted Ligety	(France) Alexis Pinturault	(Croatia) Natko Zrnčić-Dim
1540	SL	2013/14	19 January 2014	(France) Alexis Pinturault	(Germany) Felix Neureuther	(Austria) Marcel Hirscher
1573	AC	2014/15	16 January 2015	(Switzerland) Carlo Janka	(France) Victor Muffat-Jeandet	(Croatia) Ivica Kostelić
1574	SL	2014/15	17 January 2015	(Germany) Felix Neureuther	(Italy) Stefano Gross	(Norway) Henrik Kristoffersen
	SL	2014/15	18 January 2015	rescheduled on 17 January due to heavy snow; programme switched with DH		
1609	AC	2015/16	15 January 2016	(Norway) Kjetil Jansrud	(Norway) Aksel Lund Svindal	(France) Adrien Théaux
1611	SL	2015/16	17 January 2016	(Norway) Henrik Kristoffersen	(Italy) Giuliano Razzoli	(Italy) Stefano Gross
1654	AC	2016/17	13 January 2017	(Switzerland) Niels Hintermann	(France) Maxence Muzaton	(Austria) Frederic Berthold
1655	SL	2016/17	15 January 2017	(Norway) Henrik Kristoffersen	(Austria) Marcel Hirscher	(Germany) Felix Neureuther
1692	AC	2017/18	12 January 2018	(France) Victor Muffat-Jeandet	(Russia) Pavel Trikhichev	(Italy) Peter Fill
1694	SL	2017/18	14 January 2018	(Austria) Marcel Hirscher	(Norway) Henrik Kristoffersen	(Sweden) André Myhrer
1729	AC	2018/19	18 January 2019	(Austria) Marco Schwarz	(France) Victor Muffat-Jeandet	(France) Alexis Pinturault
1731	SL	2018/19	20 January 2019	(France) Clément Noël	(Austria) Manuel Feller	(Austria) Marcel Hirscher
1765	AC	2019/20	17 January 2020	(Austria) Matthias Mayer	(France) Alexis Pinturault	(France) Victor Muffat-Jeandet
1767	SL	2019/20	19 January 2020	(France) Clément Noël	(Norway) Henrik Kristoffersen	(Russia) Aleksandr Khoroshilov
	SL	2020/21	17 January 2021	COVID-19 pandemic; replaced on 17 January 2021 in Kitzbühel		
1838	SL	2021/22	16 January 2022	(Norway) Lucas Braathen	(Switzerland) Daniel Yule	(Italy) Giuliano Razzoli
1874	SL	2022/23	20 January 2023	(Norway) Henrik Kristoffersen	(Switzerland) Loic Meillard	(Norway) Lucas Braathen
1908	SL	2023/24	14 January 2024	(Austria) Manuel Feller	(Norway) Atle Lie McGrath	(Norway) Henrik Kristoffersen
1947	SL	2024/25	19 January 2025	(Norway) Atle Lie McGrath	(Norway) Timon Haugan	(Norway) Henrik Kristoffersen
1986	SL	2025/26	18 January 2026	(Norway) Atle Lie McGrath	(Brazil) Lucas Pinheiro Braathen	(Norway) Henrik Kristoffersen

Combined shared with other venues: Garmisch-Partenkirchen (1976), Adelboden (1982), Parpan (1984) and Veysonnaz (1998).

== Club5+ ==
In 1986, elite Club5 was originally founded by prestigious classic downhill organizers: Kitzbühel, Wengen, Garmisch, Val d’Isère and Val Gardena/Gröden, with goal to bring alpine ski sport on the highest levels possible.

Later over the years other classic longterm organizers joined the now named Club5+: Alta Badia, Cortina, Kranjska Gora, Maribor, Lake Louise, Schladming, Adelboden, Kvitfjell, St. Moritz, and Åre.
