= Lauberhorn ski races =

Alpine skiing competition in Switzerland

Lauberhorn - Downhill

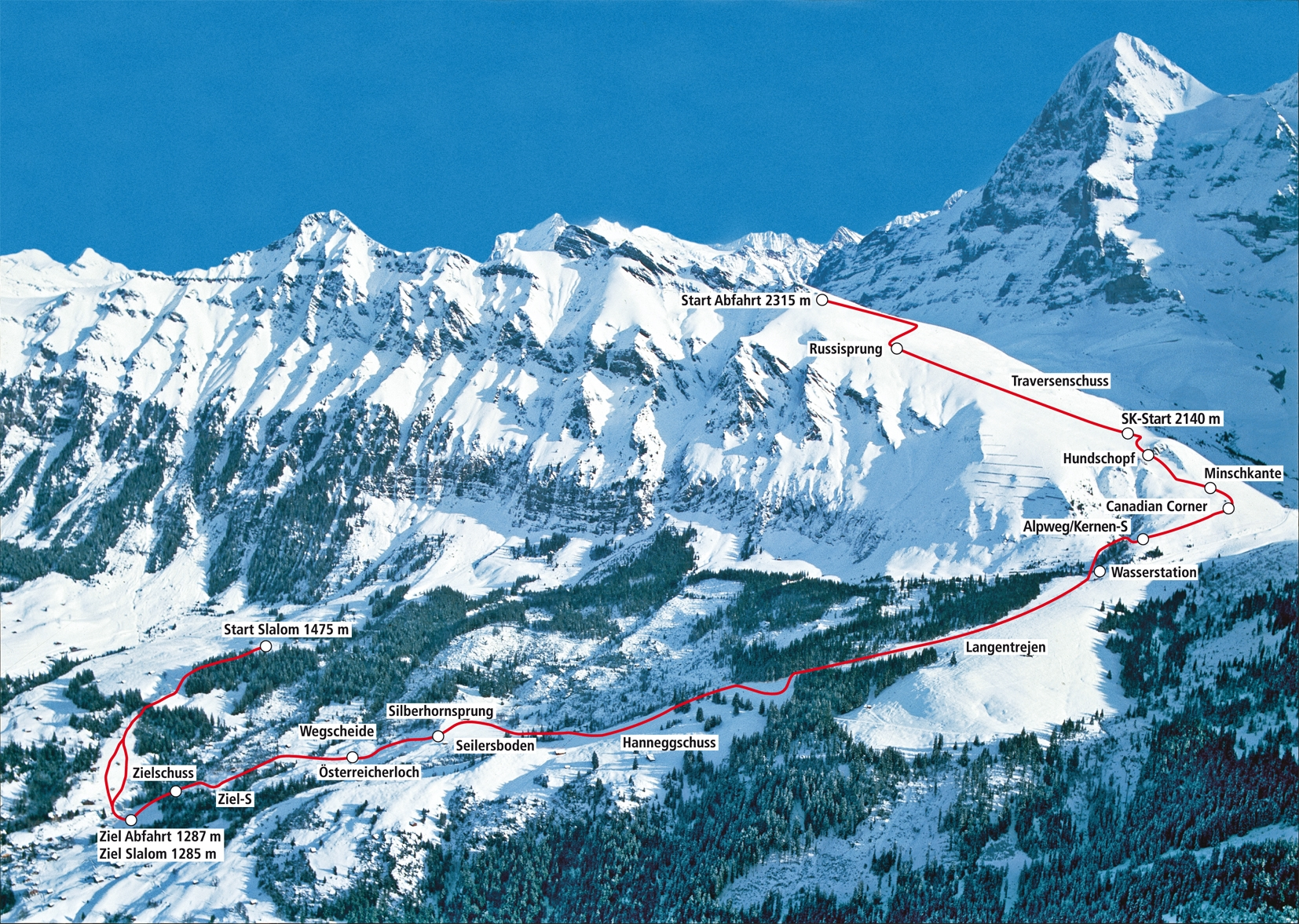
- Map of downhill and slalom courses

- Location within Switzerland Location within Alps Location within Europe
- Location: Wengen, Switzerland
- Coordinates: 46.593°N 7.925°E
- Vertical: 1,028 m (3,373 ft)
- Top elevation: 2,315 m (7,595 ft)
- Base elevation: 1,287 m (4,222 ft)

The Lauberhorn ski races (Lauberhorn World Cup alpine ski races (German: Lauberhornrennen) (downhill, slalom, and combined) are among the highest-attended winter sports events in the world, attracting around 30,000 spectators each year.

The races in Wengen in the Bernese Oberland are held in mid-January, usually the week prior to the Hahnenkamm, in Kitzbühel, Austria, another classic downhill race run since the early 1930s.

The Lauberhorn is a mountain in the Bernese Alps of Switzerland, located between Wengen and Grindelwald, north of the Kleine Scheidegg. Its summit is at an elevation of 2,472 m (8,110 ft) above sea level.

The downhill course is the longest in the world; its length of over 4.4 km (2.7 mi) results in run times of two and a half minutes (about 30–45 seconds longer than standard downhill races); top speeds approach 160 km/h (100 mph) on its Haneggschuss, the highest speeds on the World Cup circuit.

The Lauberhorn downhill run is surrounded by the Eiger, Mönch, and Jungfrau above the Lauterbrunnen valley. It is known for run arrangements such as the Hundschopf, a signature 40 m (130 ft) jump over a rock nose, the Kernen-S (passing over a bridge at around 80 km/h (50 mph) and the Wasserstation tunnel (underpassing the viaduct of the Wengernalpbahn).

Races are held on two famous courses "Lauberhorn" (downhill) and "Männlichen / Jungfrau" (slalom).

An established attraction is the airshow by the Patrouille Suisse, the aerobatic demonstration team of the Swiss Air Force.

== Key sections ==
Many of the named portions of the course are due to historic falls or crashes by racers. The best known sections of the Lauberhorn downhill, or Lauberhornrennen, race are the following (in descending order):

- Russisprung (Russi jump), named after Swiss Olympic champion Bernhard Russi, in the upper treeless part of the course
- Hundschopf (dog's head), the Lauberhorn's signature jump over the rock nose, about a third of the way down the course
- Minsch-Kante
- Canadian Corner, a long fall-away right turn
- Alpweg trail, very narrow and only three metres (10 feet) in width
- Kernen-S (formerly the Brüggli-S), consecutive right-left 90° curves separated by a small bridge), which reduces speed considerably; exit speed very important as the slower Langentrejen flats are next.
- Wasserstation (water station), a small tunnel underpassing the local railroad Wengernalpbahn
- Langentrejen where the slope becomes significantly flatter, now ends with Super-G turns
- Haneggschuss, a pitch after the flats where top speeds approach 160 km/h (100 mph)
- Silberhornsprung (Silberhorn jump)
- Österreicherloch (Austrian hole)
- Ziel-S (finish-S) which is endurance challenging and finally a finish jump (reduced in recent seasons)

== History ==
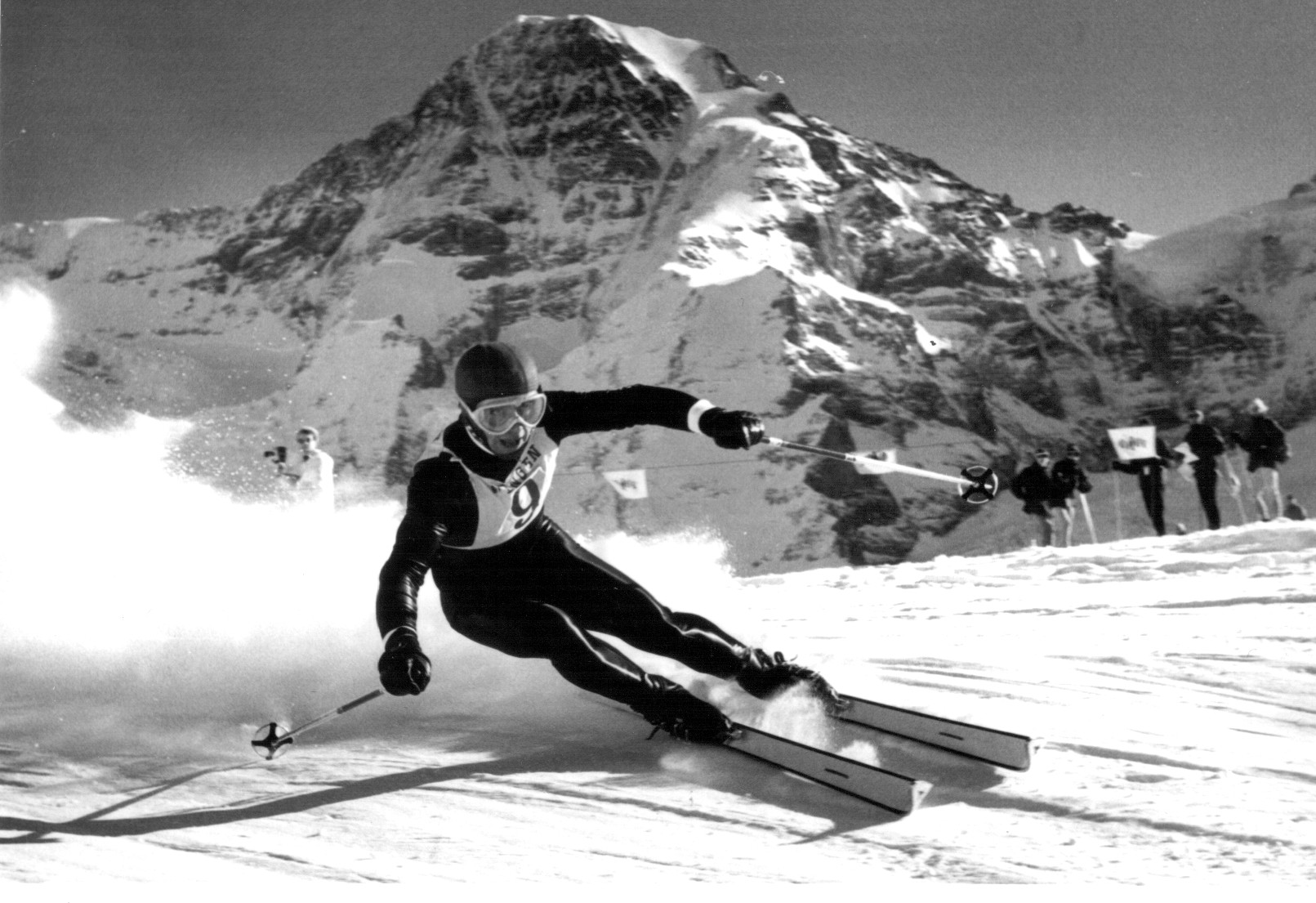
Karl Schranz in 1966, winning his third of four Lauberhorn downhills, beneath the Mönch

One of the first reports of skiing from the Lauberhorn to Wengen was in 1912 when the Roberts of Candahar Ski Challenge Cup was offered. By 1927 it was just known as the Lauberhorn Ski Cup.

It is one of the oldest continuously-held ski races. The Russisprung was originally built in the spring for a television show and was incorporated into the course by organizers the following year. The Minsch-Kante is where Josef Minsch fell in 1965 and was hospitalized for weeks. The Canadian Corner is named after two of the Crazy Canucks, Dave Irwin and Ken Read, who aggressively attacked this part of the course in 1976 and subsequently fell during the race. The Kernen-S was renamed for 2003 winner Bruno Kernen after his crash in 1997 at the former Brüggli-S. The Silberhornsprung was introduced in 2003 with the pyramid-shaped Silberhorn mountain in the background for television viewers. The Österreicherloch (Austrian hole) got its name in 1954 when almost all participating Austrian skiers (including Toni Sailer) fell there; 1960s Austrian great Karl Schranz later fell there as well.

In 1991, a tragic death occurred during training for the race at the Ziel-S (Finish-S). The young Austrian skier Gernot Reinstadler was not able to finish the S-curve properly and therefore jumped into the slope boundary (because he was too far to the right), where he hooked one ski in the security net and suffered severe injuries to the lower body. He died shortly after the accident from internal bleeding. The race was not held that year. In reaction to this tragic event, the slope boundary at that place was also equipped with rejection canvas and the gates were moved upwards and more to the left.

Snowmaking was added in the mid-1990s, and the combined race has been a run as a "super combined" since the World Cup debut of the format at Wengen in 2005. The super-combi consists of a shortened downhill and with a slalom run, both on the same day, instead of three runs (one downhill and two slalom) of the traditional combined. On the World Cup circuit, the traditional combined is usually not run as separate races, but determined "on paper" from the results of the primary downhill and slalom races, which are run on separate days. (The Olympics and world championships are the exceptions, holding separate races for the combined.) At the Winter Olympics, the super-combined format replaced the traditional combined at the 2010 Winter Games.

== Facts and figures ==
- Longest downhill race in the World Cup circuit, with a length of 4.270 km (2.65 mi) in 2019;
  typical World Cup downhill courses for men are two miles (3.2 km) or less.
- The course's starting elevation is 2,315 m (7,595 ft) above sea level;
  it descends 1,028 vertical metres (3,373 ft) to the finish at 1,287 m (4,222 ft) in Wengen.
- The course record of 2:22.58 was set by Marco Odermatt of Switzerland in 2025, with an average speed of 112.36 km/h (69.8 mph), an average vertical descent rate of 7.2 m/s (24 ft/s).
- Top speeds can exceed 160 km/h (100 mph) on the Haneggschuss, a straightaway 25–30 seconds from the finish. The highest speed ever measured in a World Cup race was reached at this section in 2013 by Johan Clarey of France at 161.9 km/h (100.6 mph). Top speeds vary from year to year, depending upon snow conditions.
- The average grade of the downhill race course is 25.3 percent (14.2 degrees).
- The maximum grade is 87 percent (41 degrees) at the Hundschopf jump, one-third of the way down the course.
- The largest crowd was recorded in 2012, when 38,000 observed the Lauberhorn downhill race.
- Ten miles (16 km) of security nets are set up at the border of the downhill run, surrounded by around 1,000 m (3,300 ft) of high security nets and 800 m (2,600 ft) of rejection canvas.
- The course was one of several featured in the 1969 movie Downhill Racer, starring Robert Redford and Gene Hackman.
  Redford's character challenges his rival teammate to a dual race at the end of practice on the Lauberhorn downhill course.
- The record holders for the most wins are Karl Molitor of Switzerland, who won six times between 1939 and 1947, and Ivica Kostelić of Croatia, who won the slalom race 4 times between 2002 and 2012, and the combined event twice, in 2011 and 2012. Unlike most of the other major ski races, the Lauberhorn in neutral Switzerland was held during World War II; all of the events were won by Swiss racers. In the post-war era, the most notable multiple winners are three Austrians: Toni Sailer with four straight (1955–58), Karl Schranz with four (1959, 1963, 1966, 1969), and Franz Klammer with three consecutive (1975–77). Switzerland's Beat Feuz has also won three times (2012, 2018, 2020)
- Austrians have won 31 times; Swiss racers have captured 29 victories (although 14 of these came before 1946).
- The first non-European to win the race was Ken Read in 1980, the sole Canadian, followed by four other North Americans (all U.S.). Lasse Kjus of Norway was the first Scandinavian champion in 1999, joined by Aksel Lund Svindal in 2016, as Norway swept all three events.
- The first American winner in the downhill was Bill Johnson, in 1984 on a shortened course; other U.S. winners include Kyle Rasmussen (1995), Daron Rahlves (2006), and Bode Miller (2007 & 2008). Miller and Marco Sullivan made the podium in 2009, taking second and third. Miller won the combined event in 2010, the second American to win the combined at Wengen and first in 52 years (Buddy Werner in 1958). Phil Mahre is the only U.S. racer to take the slalom event at Wengen, in 1982.
- After heavy snowfall in 2016, the start was lowered to shortly before the Hundschopf jump. The course length was reduced 1.74 to 2.682 km (1.08 to 1.67 mi) and the vertical drop was 729 m (2,392 ft), a reduction of 299 m (981 ft); Svindal's winning time was under 1:49, more than 47 seconds less than the previous year's. The start was similarly lowered in 2020, with a vertical drop of 738 m (2,421 ft), a course length of 2.950 km (1.83 mi), and Feuz's winning time was under 1:43.
- The 2021 races were cancelled because of COVID-19.

== Winners list ==
Year	Downhill	Slalom	Combined	Super-G
2026	(Switzerland) Marco Odermatt	(Norway) Atle Lie McGrath	——	(Italy) Giovanni Franzoni
2025	(Switzerland) Marco Odermatt	(Norway) Atle Lie McGrath	——	(Switzerland) Franjo von Allmen
2024	(Switzerland) Marco Odermatt	(Austria) Manuel Feller	——	(France) Cyprien Sarrazin
2023	(Norway) Aleksander Aamodt Kilde	(Norway) Henrik Kristoffersen	——	(Norway) Aleksander Aamodt Kilde
2022	(Austria) Vincent Kriechmayr	(Norway) Lucas Braathen	——	(Switzerland) Marco Odermatt
2021	——	——	——	——
2020	(Switzerland) Beat Feuz	(France) Clément Noël	(Austria) Matthias Mayer	——
2019	(Austria) Vincent Kriechmayr	(France) Clément Noël	(Austria) Marco Schwarz	——
2018	(Switzerland) Beat Feuz	(Austria) Marcel Hirscher	(France) Victor Muffat-Jeandet	——
2017	——	(Norway) Henrik Kristoffersen	(Switzerland) Niels Hintermann	——
2016	(Norway) Aksel Lund Svindal	(Norway) Henrik Kristoffersen	(Norway) Kjetil Jansrud	——
2015	(Austria) Hannes Reichelt	(Germany) Felix Neureuther	(Switzerland) Carlo Janka	——
2014	(Switzerland) Patrick Küng	(France) Alexis Pinturault	(United States) Ted Ligety	——
2013	(Italy) Christof Innerhofer	(Germany) Felix Neureuther	(France) Alexis Pinturault	——
2012	(Switzerland) Beat Feuz	(Croatia) Ivica Kostelić	(Croatia) Ivica Kostelić	——
2011	(Austria) Klaus Kröll	(Croatia) Ivica Kostelić	(Croatia) Ivica Kostelić	——
2010	(Switzerland) Carlo Janka	(Croatia) Ivica Kostelić	(United States) Bode Miller	——
2009	(Switzerland) Didier Défago	(Austria) Manfred Pranger	(Switzerland) Carlo Janka	——
2008	(United States) Bode Miller	(France) Jean-Baptiste Grange	(France) Jean-Baptiste Grange	——
2007	(United States) Bode Miller	——	(Austria) Mario Matt	——
2006	(United States) Daron Rahlves	(Italy) Giorgio Rocca	(Austria) Benjamin Raich	——
2005	(Austria) Michael Walchhofer	(Germany) Alois Vogl	(Austria) Benjamin Raich	——
2004	——	(Austria) Benjamin Raich	——	——
2003	(Switzerland) Bruno Kernen (Austria) Stephan Eberharter (Fri)	(Italy) Giorgio Rocca	(Norway) Kjetil André Aamodt	——
2002	(Austria) Stephan Eberharter	(Croatia) Ivica Kostelić	(Norway) Kjetil André Aamodt	——
2001	——	(Austria) Benjamin Raich	——	——
2000	(Austria) Josef Strobl	(Norway) Kjetil André Aamodt	——	——
1999	(Norway) Lasse Kjus	(Austria) Benjamin Raich	(Norway) Lasse Kjus	——
1998	(Austria) Andreas Schifferer (Austria) Hermann Maier (Fri)	(Austria) Thomas Stangassinger	(Austria) Hermann Maier	——
1997	(Italy) Kristian Ghedina	(Austria) Thomas Sykora	——	——
1996	——	——	——	——
1995	(United States) Kyle Rasmussen (Italy) Kristian Ghedina (Fri)	(Italy) Alberto Tomba	(Luxembourg) Marc Girardelli	——
1994	(Switzerland) William Besse	——	——	(Luxembourg) Marc Girardelli
1993	——	——	——	——
1992	(Switzerland) Franz Heinzer	(Italy) Alberto Tomba	(Switzerland) Paul Accola	——
1991	——	——	——	——
1990	——	——	——	——
1989	(Luxembourg) Marc Girardelli (Luxembourg) Marc Girardelli (Fri)	(Austria) Rudolf Nierlich	(Luxembourg) Marc Girardelli	——
1988	——	——	——	——
1987	(West Germany) Markus Wasmeier	(Switzerland) Joel Gaspoz	(Switzerland) Pirmin Zurbriggen	——
1986	——	(Socialist Federal Republic of Yugoslavia) Rok Petrovic	——	——
1985	(Austria) Helmut Höflehner (Austria) Peter Wirnsberger (Sun)	(Luxembourg) Marc Girardelli	(France) Michel Vion	——
1984	(United States) Bill Johnson	——	——	——
1983	——	——	——	——
1982	(Austria) Harti Weirather	(United States) Phil Mahre	(Switzerland) Pirmin Zurbriggen	——
1981	(Switzerland) Toni Bürgler	(Socialist Federal Republic of Yugoslavia) Bojan Krizaj	(Soviet Union) Valery Tsyganof	——
1980	(Switzerland) Peter Müller (Canada) Ken Read (Fri)	(Socialist Federal Republic of Yugoslavia) Bojan Krizaj	(West Germany) Michael Veith	——
1979	——	——	——	——
1978	——	(Austria) Klaus Heidegger	——	——
1977	(Austria) Franz Klammer	(Sweden) Ingemar Stenmark	(Switzerland) Walter Tresch	——
1976	(Austria) Franz Klammer (Italy) Herbert Plank (Fri)	(Sweden) Ingemar Stenmark	(Austria) Franz Klammer	——
1975	(Austria) Franz Klammer	(Sweden) Ingemar Stenmark	(Italy) Gustav Thöni	——
1974	(Switzerland) Roland Collombin	(West Germany) Christian Neureuther	(Austria) David Zwilling	——
1973	——	(West Germany) Christian Neureuther	——	——
1972	——	(France) Jean-Noel Augert	——	——
1971	——	——	——	——
1970	(France) Henri Duvillard	(France) Patrick Russel	(France) Henri Duvillard	——
1969	(Austria) Karl Schranz	(Austria) Reinhard Tritscher	(Austria) Heini Messner	——
1968	(Austria) Gerhard Nenning	(Switzerland) Dumeng Giovanoli	(Austria) Gerhard Nenning	——
1967	(France) Jean-Claude Killy	(France) Jean-Claude Killy	(France) Jean-Claude Killy	——
1966	(Austria) Karl Schranz	(France) Guy Périllat	(Austria) Karl Schranz	——
1965	(Austria) Stefan Sodat	(France) Guy Périllat	(Austria) Karl Schranz	——
1964	(Austria) Egon Zimmermann	(West Germany) Ludwig Leitner	(Austria) Gerhard Nenning	——
1963	(Austria) Karl Schranz	(France) Guy Périllat	(France) Guy Périllat	——
1962	——	(Switzerland) Adolf Mathis	——	——
1961	(France) Guy Périllat	(Austria) Pepi Stiegler	(France) Guy Périllat	——
1960	(West Germany) Willy Bogner	(Austria) Hias Leitner	(Austria) Pepi Stiegler	——
1959	(Austria) Karl Schranz	(Austria) Ernst Oberaigner	(Austria) Ernst Oberaigner	——
1958	(Austria) Toni Sailer	(Austria) Josl Rieder	(United States) Buddy Werner	——
1957	(Austria) Toni Sailer	(Austria) Anderl Molterer	(Austria) Josl Rieder	——
1956	(Austria) Toni Sailer	(Austria) Anderl Molterer	(Austria) Josl Rieder	——
1955	(Austria) Toni Sailer	(Switzerland) Martin Julen	(Austria) Toni Sailer	——
1954	(Austria) Christian Pravda	(Austria) Toni Spiss	(Austria) Christian Pravda	——
1953	(Austria) Anderl Molterer	(Austria) Anderl Molterer	(Austria) Anderl Molterer	——
1952	(Austria) Othmar Schneider	(Norway) Stein Eriksen	(Austria) Othmar Schneider	——
1951	(Austria) Othmar Schneider	(Norway) Stein Eriksen	(Austria) Othmar Schneider	——
1950	(Switzerland) Fredy Rubi	(Italy) Zeno Colò	(Switzerland) Fredy Rubi	——
1949	(Switzerland) Rudolf Graf	(Italy) Zeno Colò	(Switzerland) Adolf Odermatt	——
1948	(Italy) Zeno Colò	(Switzerland) Karl Molitor	(Switzerland) Karl Molitor	——
1947	(Switzerland) Karl Molitor	(Sweden) Olle Dalman	(Switzerland) Edy Rominger	——
1946	(France) Jean Blanc	(Switzerland) Otto von Allmen	(Switzerland) Karl Molitor	——
1945	(Switzerland) Karl Molitor	(Switzerland) Otto von Allmen	(Switzerland) Otto von Allmen	——
1944	(Switzerland) Rudolf Graf	(Switzerland) Marcel von Allmen	(Switzerland) Marcel von Allmen	——
1943	(Switzerland) Karl Molitor	(Switzerland) Heinz von Allmen	(Switzerland) Heinz von Allmen	——
1942	(Switzerland) Karl Molitor	(Switzerland) Heinz von Allmen	(Switzerland) Heinz von Allmen	——
1941	(Switzerland) Rudolf Graf	(Switzerland) Marcel von Allmen	(Switzerland) Marcel von Allmen	——
1940	(Switzerland) Karl Molitor	(Switzerland) Karl Molitor	(Switzerland) Karl Molitor	——
1939	(Switzerland) Karl Molitor	(Germany) Josef Jennewein	(Austria) Willi Walch	——
1938	(Switzerland) Heinz von Allmen	(Germany) Rudi Canz	(Switzerland) Heinz von Allmen	——
1937	(Switzerland) Heinz von Allmen	(Austria) Willi Walch	(Austria) Willi Walch	——
1936	(Switzerland) Hans Schlunegger	(Switzerland) Hermann Steuri	(France) Émile Allais	——
1935	(Austria) Richard Werle	(Switzerland) Arnold Glatthard	(Switzerland) Hans Steuri	——
1934	(Switzerland) Adolf Rubi	(Switzerland) Adolf Rubi	(Switzerland) Adolf Rubi	——
1933	——	——	——	
1932	(Switzerland) Fritz Steuri	(Switzerland) Fritz von Allmen	(Switzerland) Fritz Steuri	——
1931	(Switzerland) Fritz Steuri	(Switzerland) Hans Schlunegger	(Switzerland) Fritz Steuri	——
1930	(Switzerland) Christian Rubi	(Switzerland) Ernst Gertsch	(United Kingdom) Bill Bracken	——

== See also ==
- Swiss Alps
