= Molitor =

Molitor may refer to:

== Geography ==
- Molitor, Wisconsin
- Michel-Ange–Molitor station, a Paris Metro station
- Piscine Molitor, a swimming pool complex in the 16th arrondissement of Paris, France
- Porte Molitor, one of the city gates of Paris

== People ==
- Molitor (surname)
  - André Molitor (1911-2005), Belgian senior civil servant
  - Claudia Molitor (born 1974), English-German composer
  - Gabriel Jean Joseph Molitor (1770–1849), French general of the Napoleonic era
    - The Molitor Stradivarius, a Stradivarius violin named for its former ownership by the general
  - Ingenuin Molitor (1610–1669), German-born Franciscan priest and composer
  - Katharina Molitor (born 1983), German javelin thrower
  - Paul Molitor (born 1956), former professional baseball player and member of the National Baseball Hall of Fame
  - Valentin Molitor (1637–1713), Swiss composer and Benedictine monk

== Biology ==
- Tenebrio molitor, a species of darkling beetle
- Hyla molitor, a species of frog
- Lundomys molitor, a species of rat
