= Molitor (surname) =

Molitor is a German surname meaning "miller". Notable people with the surname include:

- André Molitor (1911–2005), former principal private secretary of King Baudouin of Belgium
- Andrew Molitor, American politician
- Bernard Molitor (1755–1833), Luxembourgish master carpenter
- Chris Molitor (born 1988), Australian basketball player
- Doug Molitor (born 1952), American screenwriter
- Gabriel Jean Joseph Molitor (1770–1849), French general
- Irene Molitor (1927–2018), Swiss alpine skier
- Jeremy Molitor (born 1977), Canadian former boxer
- Joseph Franz Molitor (1779–1860), German writer and philosopher
- Joseph Molitor (1874–1917), Bohemian-born Chicago-based church architect
- Karl Molitor (1920–2014), Swiss skier
- Katharina Molitor (born 1983), German javelin thrower
- Marc Molitor (born 1948), French former football player
- Paul Molitor (born 1956), American baseball player
- Philippe Molitor (1869–1952), Belgian colonel
- Steve Molitor (born 1980), Canadian boxer
- Ulrich Molitor (1442–1507) 15th-century professor of law at the University of Constance, Germany
- Wilhelm Molitor (1819–1880), German poet, priest, and jurist
