= Reinstadler =

Reinstadler is a surname. Notable people with the surname include:

- Beate Reinstadler (born 1967), Austrian tennis player
- Gernot Reinstadler (1970–1991), Austrian ski racer
