= Otto Linher =

Austrian skier (1922–1953)

Personal information
- Nationality: Austrian
- Born: 15 December 1922; Vorarlberg, Austria
- Died: 2 May 1953 (aged 30); Alpeiner Ferner, Austria

Sport
- Sport: Alpine skiing

Otto Linher (15 December 1922 – 2 May 1953) was an Austrian alpine skier. He competed in the men's downhill at the 1952 Winter Olympics.
