= Silberhorn =

Mountain in the Swiss Alps

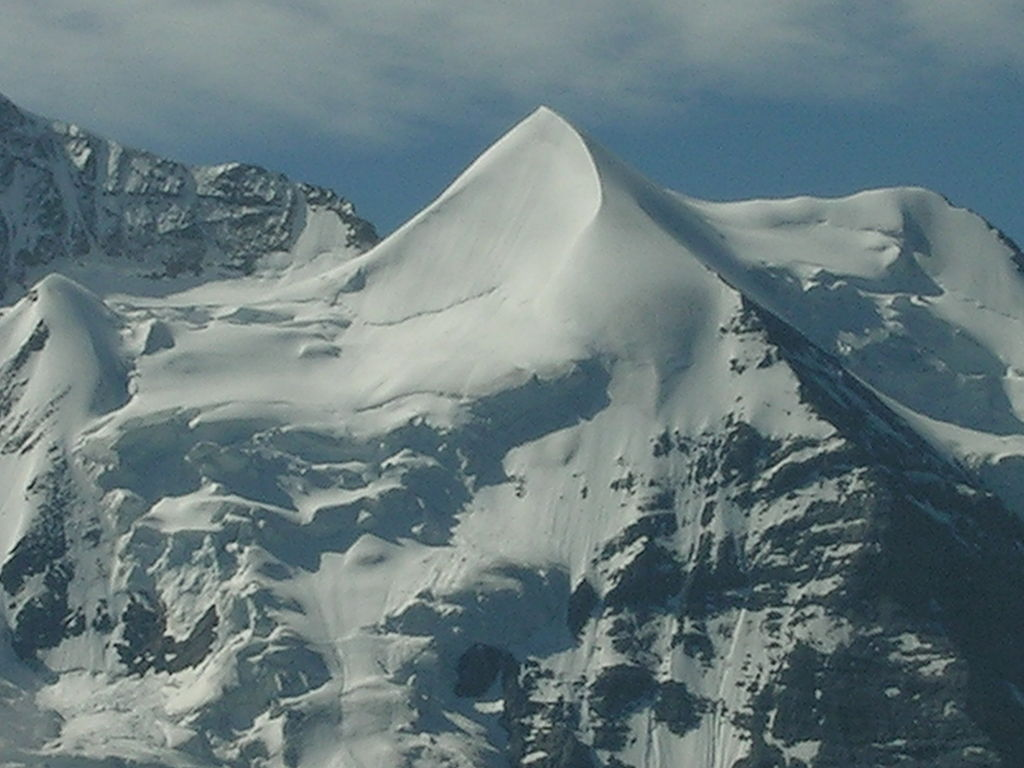

Highest point
- Elevation: 3,704 m (12,152 ft)
- Prominence: 67 m ↓ Silberlicka
- Parent peak: Jungfrau
- Coordinates: 46°32′32″N 7°56′56″E

Geography
- Location within Switzerland
- Location: Bern, Switzerland
- Parent range: Bernese Alps

Climbing
- First ascent: 1863

The Silberhorn (Swiss Standard German pronunciation: [ˈzɪlbərˌhɔrn]; 3,704 m) is a pyramid-shaped mountain of the Bernese Alps, to the northwest of the Jungfrau of which it is a satellite peak.

A first attempt to reach the summit of the Silberhorn was made in June 1863 by M. v. Fellenberg from the Stufensteinalp on the east side of the valley of Lauterbrunnen. After 9 hours of most perilous climbing the party encountered an impracticable precipice of rock, and were forced to return. In the following month of August MM. Badeker and v. Fellenberg, with two guides of Grindelwald, and others, reached the summit from the Wengernalp. Ascending by the Guggi Glacier, they passed a night on the rocks at the foot of the Schneehorn, a buttress of the Jungfrau dividing the Guggi and Giessen Glaciers. On the following day they gained the desired summit by a long and difficult circuit under the cliffs of the Jungfrau. The still longer and equally difficult ascent of the Jungfrau was effected from this side for the first time two years later.

The northwest ridge was first ascended in 1865 by the Rev. James John Hornby, Rev. Thomas Henry Philpot, with guides Christian and Ulrich Almer, Johann Bischof, and Christian Lauener.

Silberhorn and Jungfrau 1837 (on the left: Mönch). Gouache painting by Johann Heinrich Bleuler, the Younger (1787–1857)

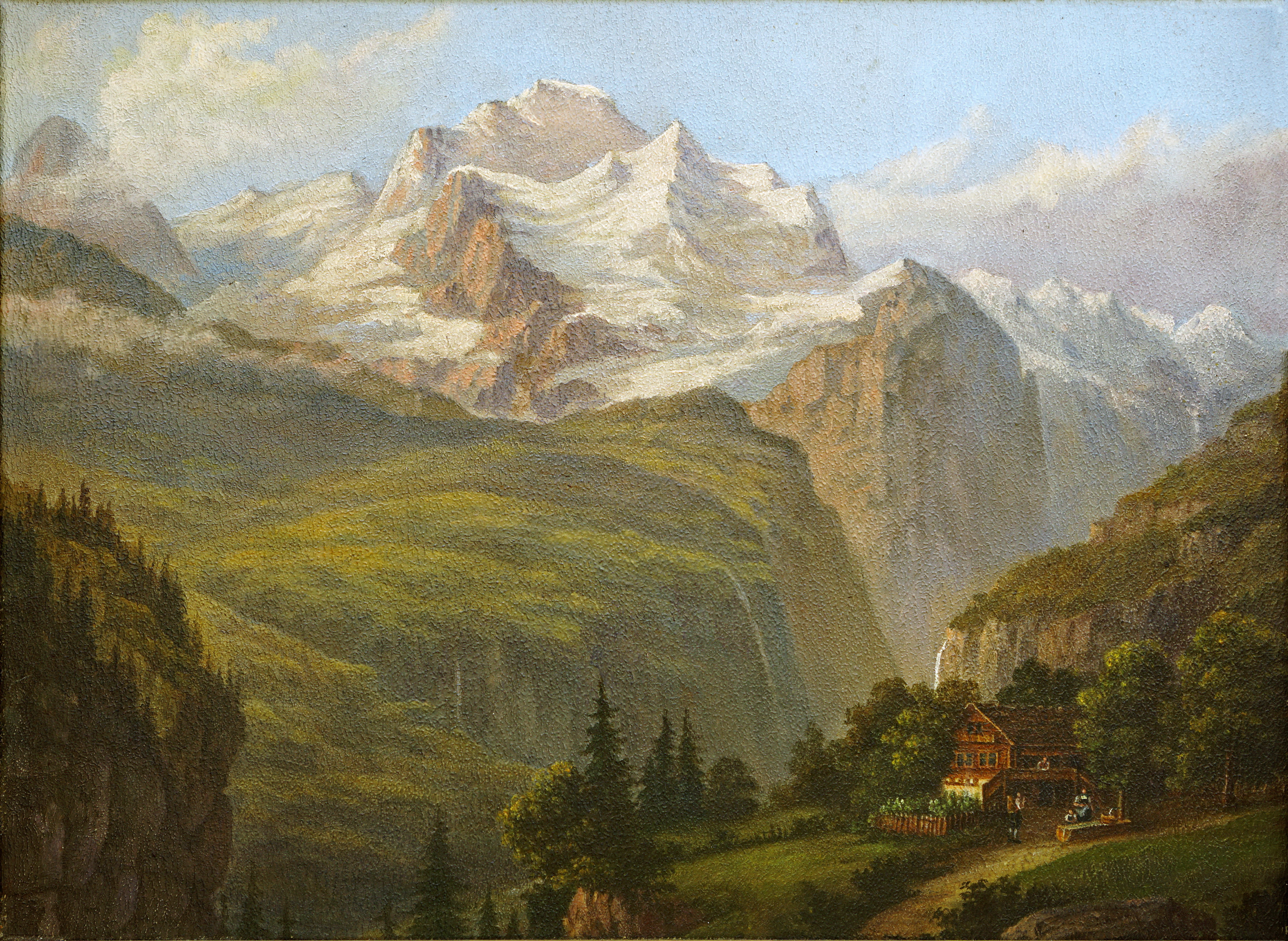
Silberhorn and Jungfrau c. 1870. Oil painting by Heinrich Müller

In a 1968 letter, J. R. R. Tolkien identified the Silberhorn as it appeared to him when camping near Mürren in 1911 as "the Silvertine (Celebdil) of my dreams".

Near the bottom of the World Cup Lauberhorn downhill course is the Silberhornsprung, a jump with the Silberhorn visible in the background for the television audience.
