= Karl Graf =

Austrian footballer

Personal information
- Date of birth: 26 October 1904
- Date of death: 1 January 1956 (aged 51)

International career
Years	Team	Apps	(Gls)
1928–1932	Austria	2	(0)

Karl Graf (26 October 1904 – 1 January 1956) was an Austrian footballer. He played in two matches for the Austria national football team from 1928 to 1932.
