= Chris Molitor =

Australian basketball player

Chris Molitor (born 28 August 1988) is a former Australian professional basketball forward who spent the 2009–10 season playing with the NBL's Adelaide 36ers.

Standing at 6 ft 8 in (203 cm), Molitor was recruited by Adelaide from the West Adelaide Bearcats and filled the 36ers final roster spot as part of the NBL's requirement to have one player under the age of 23. Molitor appeared in six games for the 36ers, in which he grabbed two rebounds and scored a 3-pointer on 1-for-8 shooting, and finished third in NBL Rookie of the Year voting during the season. He was delisted by the 36ers for the 2010–2011 season.

Molitor is currently pursuing Australian rules football instead of basketball, having for West Adelaide Football Club in the South Australian National Football League (SANFL)after leaving the 36ers. His appearances with the team's reserve squad make him eligible to be selected by AFL teams in December 2010.

== Personal life ==
Molitor was born in South Australia. He is the son of Mark Molitor, the 1989 Coach of the Year of the North Adelaide Rockets of the WNBL, and Benita Molitor, who played with the Canberra Capitals of the WNBL.
