= Ingenuin Molitor =

Ingenuin Molitor (Habach, 1610–1669) was a German-born Franciscan priest and composer. He was organist to the convent at Bolzano, Tyrol, and published a book of sacred concertos in Innsbruck in 1668.
