= Fritz Steuri =

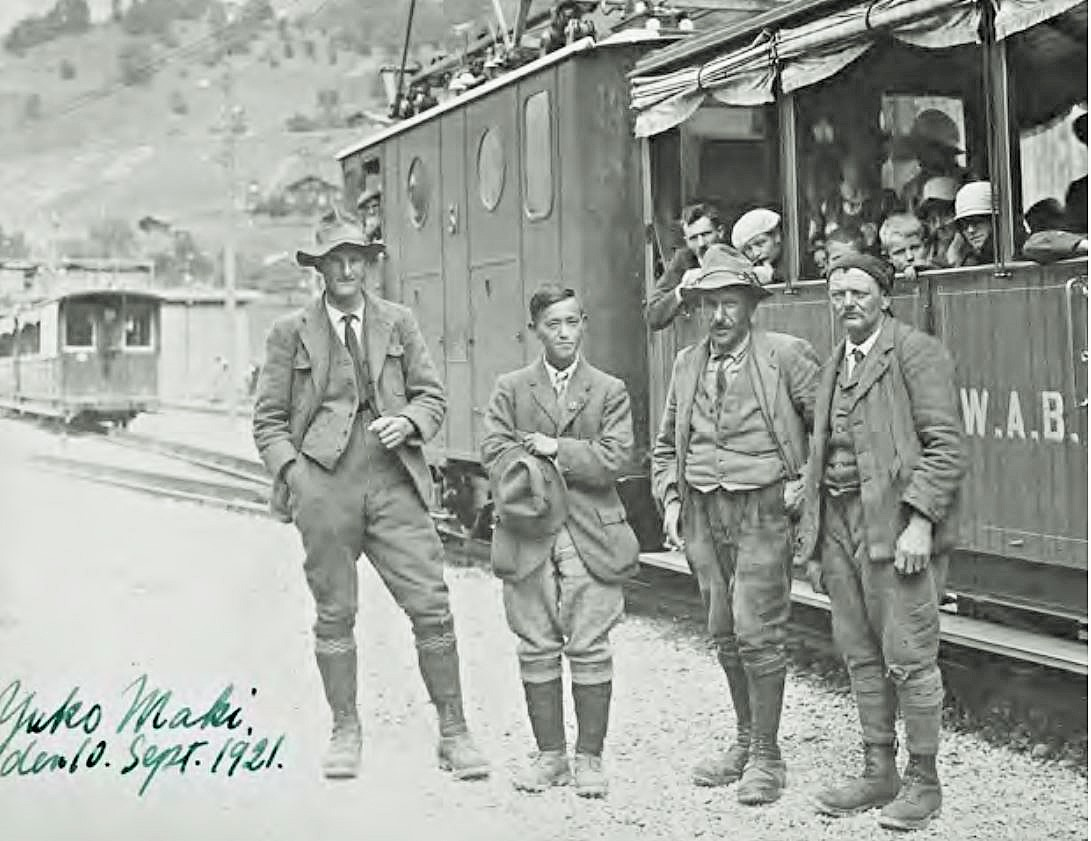

Personal information
- Nationality: Swiss
- Born: 25 July 1879 Grindelwald, Switzerland
- Died: 5 September 1950 (aged 71) Grindelwald, Switzerland
- Occupations: Mountain climber and Alpine and Nordic skier

Climbing career
- First ascents: Mittellegigrat

Fritz Steuri (born 25 July 1879 in Grindelwald, Switzerland, died 5 September 1950 in Grindelwald, Switzerland) was a Swiss mountain climber and Nordic and alpine skier. He was a three-time Swiss champion in cross-country skiing. In 1921, he took part in the first ascent of the Mittellegigrat (the northeast ridge of the Eiger).

== Skier ==
Fritz Steuri came into contact with skiing in the early 1890s when he saw the Englishman Gerald Fox (who lived at Tone Dale House) skiing in Grindelwald. In 1898, he bought his first pair of skis from a Grindelwald manufactory. The first ski race was held in Grindelwald before the turn of the century, in which Steuri, who pursued regular ski training, took part with other locals. Even in his job as a postman, which he held from 1899 until he became a mountain guide, he rendered valuable services to skiing. In 1902, he was among the founding members of the Grindelwald Ski Club.

Fritz Steuri became one of the best skiers in the early days of Swiss ski racing. Especially in endurance or alpine endurance, as cross-country skiing was called, he was a leading athlete in the early twentieth century. In January 1903, Steuri won the Grindelwald ski club's second race in downhill skiing and came second in both ski jumping and endurance. In January 1904 he won the third club downhill race. In February 1903, Steuri won the "International Cup in alpine endurance" organized in Adelboden by the Ski Club of Bern, which he also won in 1904 (again in Adelboden) and 1905 (in Zweisimmen). From 1904 to 1906, he won three consecutive major Grindelwald endurance ski races.

After the founding of the Swiss Ski Federation on 20 November 1904, on 21 and 22 January 1905 the first Swiss ski championships ("Erstes Grosses Skirennen der Schweiz") were held in Glarus. Steuri was the Swiss champion in endurance. On the 20-kilometer route over the Pragel Pass with 560 meters slope and 1160 meters down, he came in first of 32 participants in a time of 1 hour, 54 minutes and 7 seconds. In 1906 in Zweisimmen and 1907 in Davos Steuri was again the Swiss champion in endurance, whereupon he was asked not to participate in this race to offer other athletes a chance to win.

Steuri also worked as a ski instructor. He instructed Hermann and Othmar Gurtner and Walter Amstutz in alpine driving technique and the "classic" snowplough turns Telemark, stem Christie and stem turn. In 1926 Steuri was president of the Grindelwald ski club. He gave ski lessons into the 1930s.

== Mountain guide ==
Besides skiing, Fritz Steuri was also a renowned mountain guide. In 1905 he earned his leader patent, having previously climbed numerous summits, including the Jungfrau, the Eiger, the Finsteraarhorn and the Wetterhorn. Steuri worked for 45 years as a mountain guide, mainly around Grindelwald and in the Valais and Grison Alps. On 10 September 1921 he took part in the first ascent of the Mittellegigrat (the northeast ridge of the Eiger) with the Japanese climber Yuko Maki and fellow guides Fritz Amatter and Samuel Brawand. The descent of the ridge had been made for the first time in 1885. Shortly beforehand, Steuri had climbed the Dufourspitze, the Matterhorn and the Aletschhorn with Maki and Brawand. Subsequently, Steuri led many Japanese on Alpine summits, including Prince Chichibu, with whom Steuri and other guides climbed the Wetterhorn, the Finsteraarhorn, the Schreckhorn, the Matterhorn, the summit of Monte Rosa and other mountains in September 1926. On 26 May 1926 Steuri, Prince Chichibu, Walter Amstutz, Arnold Lunn and two others first climbed the Grindelwalder Grünhorn on skis. Among other famous clients Steuri counted the writer Konrad Falke, whom he guided in September 1907 in the Jungfrau region. This resulted in Falke's 1909 published book Im Banne der Jungfrau (Under the Spell of the Virgin).

From about 1930, Steuri specialized as a Jungfrau guide. He worked as one of the "Jochführer", the guides who after the construction of the Jungfrau railway were always stationed at Jungfraujoch and led tourists from there to the surrounding peaks. As a result, in his lifetime Steuri made 1139 ascents of the Jungfrau - sometimes twice in a day. In summer 1938 Steuri led the search party that discovered the body of Italian climber Bartolo Sandri, who had died along with his partner, Mario Menti, in an attempt on the north face of the Eiger. Steuri was sometime landlord of the Konkordia Hut and chairman of the Grindelwald mountain rescue.

== Family ==
Fritz Steuri had four sons, the three eldest of whom were also known as mountain guides: Fritz Jr. (1908-1953), Hermann (1909-2001), Hans (1911-1975) and Rudolf (1913-1987). Fritz Jr. and Hermann scored numerous successes in ski racing. Fritz Jr. represented Switzerland in ski jumping and Nordic combined at the 1932 Winter Olympics. He headed the ski school at Kleine Scheidegg, but was killed in a climbing accident. Rudolf was also a ski instructor at first, but then worked in regional policy.
