= Heinz von Allmen =

Swiss alpine skier and cross-country skier

Heinz von Allmen (10 August 1913 – 11 November 2003 in Lauterbrunnen) was a Swiss Alpine skier and cross-country skier.

== World Championships medals ==
One of Wengen's most successful ski racers, Heinz von Allmen won the following races:

- 1936 in Innsbruck - silver in Alpine combination
- 1934 in Mürren - bronze in downhill
- 1936 in Innsbruck - bronze in downhill
- 1934 in Mürren - bronze in Alpine combination

Heinz also won the Lauberhorn 7 times and the Swiss Ski Championships 9 times.

== Brothers ==
Heinz' two younger brothers, Marcel von Allmen and Otto von Allmen were also ski champions. Marcel was two-time winner of the Lauberhorn (1941 and 1944). Otto was 10 times Swiss ski champion, three times winner of the Lauberhorn, and champion of the Nordic/Alpine combined in 1944. The three brothers won 19 Swiss ski championship races, 19 Lauberhorn races, 4 World Championship races. In the period leading up to, and during, World War II, the brothers (along with Hans Schlunegger, also of Wengen), were champions in the combined Nordic/Alpine disciplines, which were dropped after the war because of the difficulty of training for all four events.
