= Josef Rieder =

German cyclist

Personal information
- Born: 26 December 1893 Munich, Germany
- Died: 13 July 1916 (aged 22) Verdun, France

Cycling career
- Sport: Cycling

Josef Rieder (26 December 1893 – 13 July 1916) was a German cyclist. He competed in two events at the 1912 Summer Olympics. He died during the Battle of Verdun in the First World War.

== See also ==
- List of Olympians killed in World War I
