= Ernst Oberaigner =

Austrian alpine skier (1932–2023)

Personal information
- Nationality: Austrian
- Born: 5 November 1932; Saalfelden, Austria
- Died: 17 April 2023 (aged 90); Saalfelden, Austria

Sport
- Sport: Alpine skiing

Ernst Oberaigner (5 November 1932 – 17 April 2023) was an Austrian alpine skier. He competed in the men's slalom at the 1960 Winter Olympics.

Oberaigner died in Saalfelden on 17 April 2023, at the age of 90.
