= Karl Molitor =

Swiss alpine skier (1920–2014)

Medal record

Men's alpine skiing

Representing Switzerland

Winter Olympics
Silver medal – second place	1948 St. Moritz	Combined
Bronze medal – third place	1948 St. Moritz	Downhill

World Championship
Bronze medal – third place	1939 Zakopane	Downhill

Karl Molitor (29 June 1920 – 25 August 2014) was a Swiss alpine skier who competed in the 1948 Winter Olympics.

Born in Wengen, he married Antoinette Meyer (who also competed in the 1948 Winter Olympics). In 1948 he won a silver medal in the Alpine combined event and a bronze medal in the downhill competition. In the slalom contest he finished eighth. Karl Molitor also won a very prestigious world renowned race many times which is called the Lauberhorn ski races with winners such as Bode Miller. He won the downhill ski race in 1939, 1940, 1942, 1943, 1945 and 1947. He won the slalom ski race in 1940 and 1948 and won the combined in 1940, 1946 and 1948. In 1940 he won all of the events in the Lauberhorn ski races meaning he is only the second ever person to get this achievement and the most recent. He went on to open a ski-shop in Wengen called Molitor and the shop rents and sells ski gear in the village.
