= Fred Rubi =

Swiss alpine skier (1926–1997)

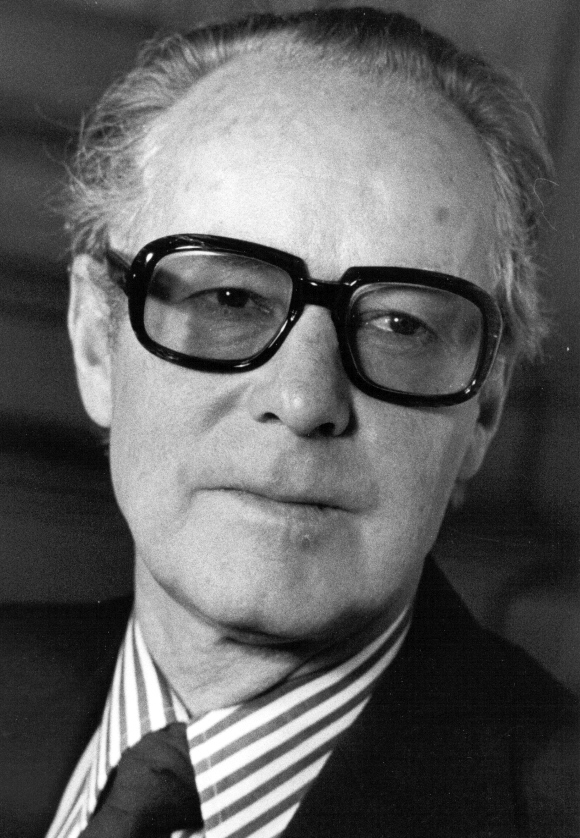

Personal information
- Nationality: Swiss
- Born: 12 October 1926; Bern, Switzerland
- Died: 5 September 1997 (aged 70); Bern, Switzerland

Sport
- Sport: Alpine skiing

Fred Rubi (12 October 1926 – 5 September 1997) was a Swiss alpine skier. He competed in three events at the 1952 Winter Olympics.
