= Michel Vion =

French alpine skier (born 1959)

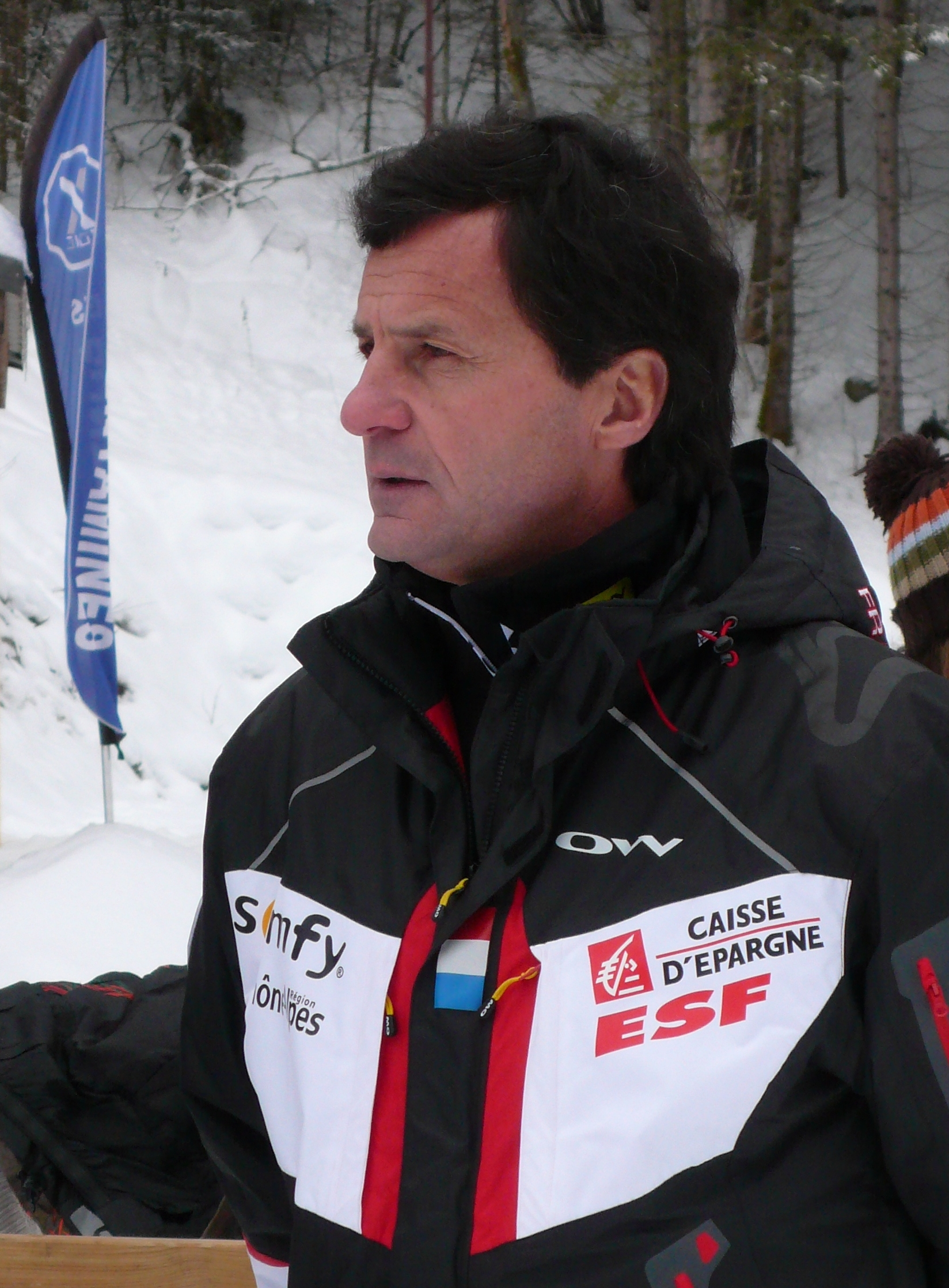
- Michel Vion (2011)

Personal information
- Nationality: French
- Born: 22 October 1959 (age 66) Moûtiers, Savoie, France

Sport
- Sport: Alpine skiing
Medal record
Representing France
Men's Alpine skiing
World championship
| Gold medal – first place | 1982 Schladming | Combined |

Michel Vion (born 22 October 1959 in Moûtiers) is a French alpine skier and world champion. He competed in three events at the 1984 Winter Olympics.

Vion became a world champion in the combined event in Schladming in 1982. He finished 5th in combined at the world championships in Bormio in 1985. Also in 1985, Vion won the "Lauberhorn Combined" World Cup Race. - Since 2010, he is the president of the French Skiing Federation.

He was appointed Secretary-General of the International Ski Federation in June 2021. In 2022, Vion opposed the decision of the Norwegian Ski Federation to refuse the participation of Russian and Belarusian skiers in World Cup events during the Russian invasion of Ukraine.
