= Lauberhorn =

Mountain in Switzerland

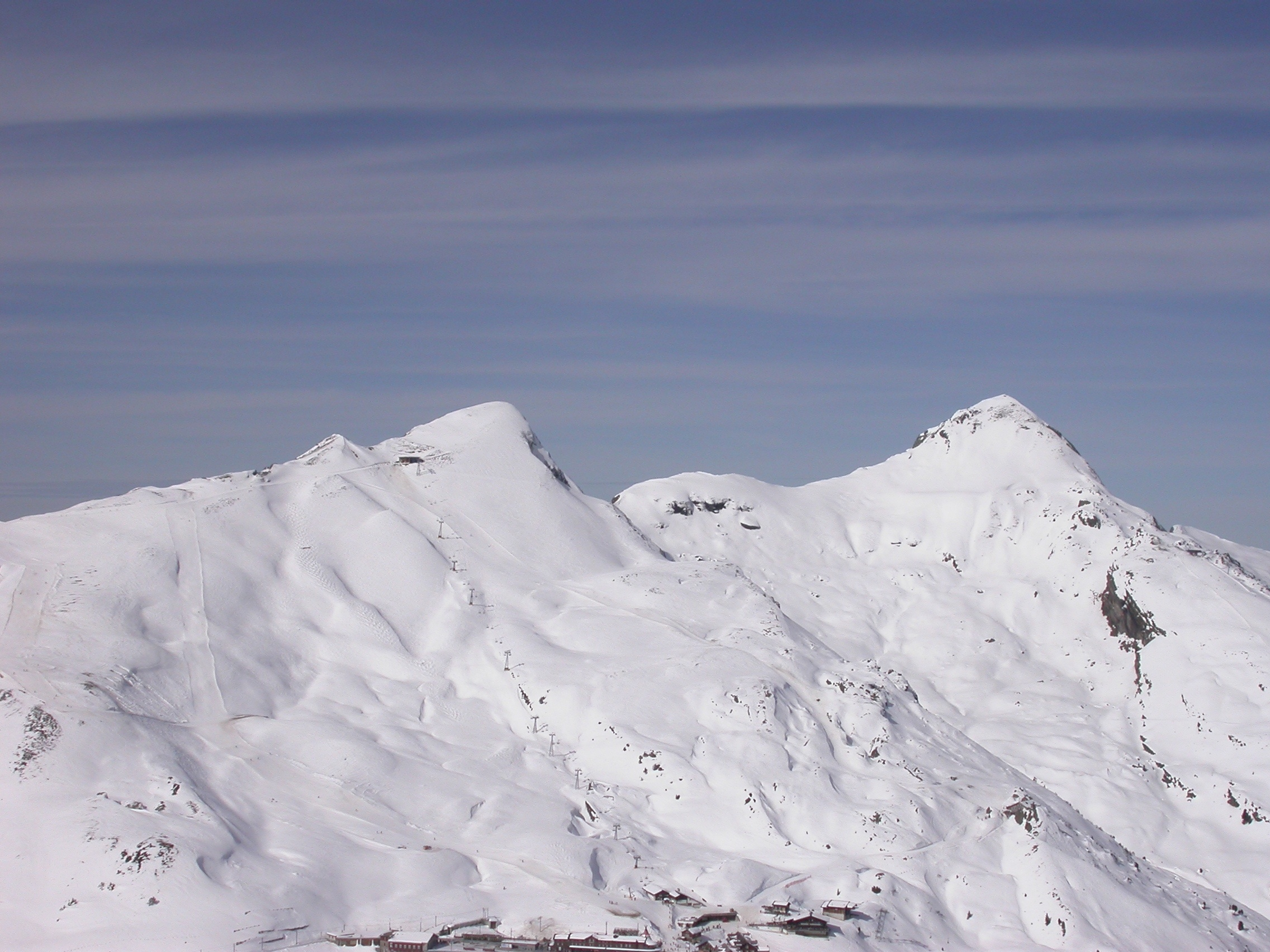
- The Lauberhorn and its downhill course with the Tschuggen (right)

Highest point
- Elevation: 2,472 m (8,110 ft)
- Prominence: 122 m (400 ft)
- Parent peak: Tschuggen
- Coordinates: 46°35′32.9″N 7°56′52.6″E

Geography
- Location within Switzerland
- Location: Bern, Switzerland
- Parent range: Bernese Alps

The Lauberhorn (Swiss Standard German pronunciation: [ˈlaʊbərˌhɔrn]) is a mountain in the Bernese Alps of Switzerland, located between Wengen and Grindelwald, north of the Kleine Scheidegg. Its summit is at an elevation of 2,472 m (8,110 ft) above sea level.

== Lauberhorn ski races ==
The mountain is best known for the Lauberhorn World Cup alpine ski races, held annually in mid-January above Wengen. The downhill course is currently (as of 2016) the longest in the world; its length of 4.48 km (2.78 mi) results in run times of two and a half minutes.

The Lauberhorn ski races (downhill, slalom, and combined) are among the highest-attended winter sports events in the world, attracting around 30,000 spectators each year.

Races are held on two famous courses "Lauberhorn" (downhill) and "Männlichen" (slalom).

== See also ==
- List of mountains of Switzerland accessible by public transport
- Swiss Alps
