= Adolf Rubi =

Swiss skier (1905–1988)

Personal information
- Nationality: Swiss
- Born: 12 January 1905 Stockholm
- Died: 23 April 1988 (aged 83)

Sport
- Sport: Nordic combined skiing

Adolf Rubi (January 12, 1905 – April 23, 1988) was a Swiss skier. He competed at the 1928 Winter Olympics in St. Moritz, where he placed 11th in Nordic combined.
