= Adolf Odermatt =

Swiss alpine skier (1924–1998)

Personal information
- Nationality: Swiss
- Born: 17 June 1924 Engelberg, Obwalden, Switzerland
- Died: 22 October 1998 (aged 74)

Sport
- Sport: Alpine skiing

Adolf Odermatt (17 June 1924 – 22 October 1998) was a former Swiss alpine skier. He competed in two events at the 1948 Winter Olympics.
