= Gernot Reinstadler =

Austrian alpine skier (1970–1991)

- Gernot in 1991

Personal information
- Born: August 24, 1970
- Died: January 19, 1991

Sport
- Sport: Skiing

Gernot Reinstadler (24 August 1970 – 19 January 1991) was an Austrian alpine ski racer who competed in downhill skiing. A member of the Austrian national ski team. He died following a crash during a qualifying run for the Lauberhorn ski races in Wengen, Switzerland, in January 1991.

== Career ==
From 1987, Reinstadler was a member of the Austrian ski team. He competed in international junior alpine skiing competitions, including the FIS Junior World Ski Championships.

At the 1988 Junior World Ski Championships in Madonna di Campiglio, Italy, he finished 19th in the super G. At the 1989 championships in Alyeska, Alaska, he secured 13th in downhill, 18th in super G, 20th in slalom and 21st in giant slalom, according to the International Ski and Snowboard Federation's athlete database.

Austrian skiing veteran Peter Wirnsberger described Reinstadler as a future prospect for the country's downhill team following his death.

== Death ==
On 18 January 1991, Reinstadler took part in a qualifying race for the Lauberhorn downhill event in Wengen, Switzerland. The qualification format had been introduced experimentally by the International Ski Federation to determine the competitors for the main downhill race.

During the run, Reinstadler lost control in the final S-shaped turn near the finish, known as the Ziel-S. One of his ski tips became caught in the safety netting, causing him to crash at high speed. He sustained a severe pelvic fracture and extensive internal injuries, including damage to blood vessels in the pelvic region.

He was transported by helicopter to a hospital in Interlaken, where doctors performed emergency surgery. Despite extensive medical treatment and repeated blood transfusions, he died from severe internal bleeding shortly after midnight on 19 January 1991. He was 20 years old.

== Aftermath and safety changes ==
Following Reinstadler's death, organisers cancelled the remaining Lauberhorn World Cup races scheduled for that weekend. The accident also prompted renewed attention to safety arrangements on downhill courses.

Subsequent safety improvements included the development of protective coverings for safety nets to prevent ski tips from becoming entangled in them. The finish section of the Lauberhorn course was also modified, including changes to the jump near the finish area.

== Memorial ==
In 1992, a memorial plaque commemorating Reinstadler was installed at the finish building in Wengen.
