= Othmar Schneider =

Austrian alpine skier (1928–2012)

Olympic medal record

Men's Alpine Skiing
Gold medal – first place	1952 Oslo	Slalom
Silver medal – second place	1952 Oslo	Downhill

Othmar Schneider (27 August 1928 – 25 December 2012) was an Austrian alpine skier and Olympic champion.

Schneider was born in Lech am Arlberg. At the 1952 Winter Olympics in Oslo, he was the gold medalist in the slalom and the silver medalist in the downhill.
