= 1985–86 FIS Alpine Ski World Cup =

International sports competition

FIS Alpine Ski World Cup 1985/86
Discipline	Men	Women
Overall	(Luxembourg) Marc Girardelli	(Switzerland) Maria Walliser
Downhill	(Austria) Peter Wirnsberger	(Switzerland) Maria Walliser
Super G	(West Germany) Markus Wasmeier	(West Germany) Marina Kiehl
Giant Slalom	(Switzerland) Joël Gaspoz	(Switzerland) Vreni Schneider
Slalom	(Socialist Federal Republic of Yugoslavia) Rok Petrovič	(Austria) Roswitha Steiner
Combined	(Switzerland) Pirmin Zurbriggen	(Switzerland) Maria Walliser
Nations Cup	Austria	Switzerland
- Nations Cup overall: Switzerland

Competition
Locations	24	19
Individual	45	37

The 20th World Cup season began in August 1985 in Argentina (for men only), resumed in December 1985 in Italy, and concluded in March 1986 in Canada. Because of the South America events (held during winter in the Southern Hemisphere), this was the first time that the World Cup season had started prior to December 1. The overall champions were Marc Girardelli of Luxembourg, his second consecutive overall win, and Maria Walliser of Switzerland, her first.

This was the first season in which a separate discipline championship was awarded for Super G, which had been introduced as a part of giant slalom in the 1983 season. The addition increased the number of discipline champions to five, which led to the elimination of the Combined discipline championship the next season. Combined would not award another World Cup discipline championship until after the introduction of the "Super Combined" (downhill/slalom) or "Alpine combined" (Super G/slalom) races, but that championship would only last from the 2006/07 season until it was again eliminated after the 2011/12 season.

In addition, the number of men's races that counted for World Cup championship points reached 45, which remains the all-time high. There were also two individual parallel slaloms held for men (one in Vienna in January and one as the final event in Bromont) that only counted toward the Nations Cup team championship.

== Calendar ==
=== Men ===
Event Key: DH – Downhill, SL – Slalom, GS – Giant Slalom, SG – Super Giant Slalom, KB – Combined, PS – Parallel Slalom (Nations Cup ranking only)
Race	Season	Date	Place	Type	Winner	Second	Third
524	1	16 August 1985	(Argentina) Las Leñas	DH _{154}	(Switzerland) Karl Alpiger	(United States) Doug Lewis	(Austria) Helmut Höflehner
525	2	18 August 1985	(Argentina) Las Leñas	DH _{155}	(Switzerland) Karl Alpiger	(Switzerland) Peter Müller	(West Germany) Markus Wasmeier
526	3	1 December 1985	(Italy) Sestriere	SL _{166}	(Socialist Federal Republic of Yugoslavia) Rok Petrovič	(Socialist Federal Republic of Yugoslavia) Bojan Križaj	(Italy) Ivano Edalini
527	4	7 December 1985	(France) Val d'Isère	DH _{156}	(Italy) Michael Mair	(Luxembourg) Marc Girardelli	(Austria) Peter Wirnsberger
528	5	14 December 1985	(Italy) Val Gardena	DH _{157}	(Austria) Peter Wirnsberger	(Switzerland) Peter Müller	(West Germany) Sepp Wildgruber
529	6	15 December 1985	(Italy) Alta Badia	GS _{151}	(Sweden) Ingemar Stenmark	(Austria) Hubert Strolz	(Italy) Roberto Erlacher
530	7	14 December 1985; 15 December 1985	(Italy) Val Gardena (DH) (Italy) Alta Badia (GS)	KB _{043}	(Luxembourg) Marc Girardelli	(Sweden) Niklas Henning	(Switzerland) Pirmin Zurbriggen
531	8	16 December 1985	(Italy) Madonna di Campiglio	SL _{167}	(Sweden) Jonas Nilsson	(Socialist Federal Republic of Yugoslavia) Bojan Križaj	(Liechtenstein) Paul Frommelt
532	9	20 December 1985	(Socialist Federal Republic of Yugoslavia) Kranjska Gora	GS _{152}	(Switzerland) Joël Gaspoz	(Italy) Roberto Erlacher	(Austria) Hubert Strolz
533	10	21 December 1985	(Socialist Federal Republic of Yugoslavia) Kranjska Gora	SL _{168}	(Socialist Federal Republic of Yugoslavia) Rok Petrovič	(Sweden) Jonas Nilsson	(Austria) Thomas Stangassinger
534	11	31 December 1985	(Austria) Schladming	DH _{158}	(Austria) Peter Wirnsberger	(Switzerland) Peter Müller	(Austria) Erwin Resch
535	12	3 January 1986	(Socialist Federal Republic of Yugoslavia) Kranjska Gora	GS _{153}	(Switzerland) Joël Gaspoz	(Austria) Hubert Strolz	(West Germany) Markus Wasmeier
Nations Cup		6 January 1986	(Austria) Vienna	PS _{ncr}	(Italy) Ivano Edalini	(Germany) Markus Wasmeier	(Austria) Anton Steiner
536	13	12 January 1986	(West Germany) Berchtesgaden	SL _{169}	(Sweden) Johan Wallner	(Socialist Federal Republic of Yugoslavia) Bojan Križaj	(France) Daniel Mougel
537	14	17 January 1986	(Austria) Kitzbühel	DH _{159}	(Austria) Peter Wirnsberger	(Austria) Erwin Resch	(Switzerland) Pirmin Zurbriggen
538	15	18 January 1986	(Austria) Kitzbühel	DH _{160}	(Austria) Peter Wirnsberger	(Austria) Erwin Resch	(Italy) Michael Mair
539	16	19 January 1986	(Austria) Kitzbühel	SL _{170}	(Liechtenstein) Paul Frommelt	(Sweden) Ingemar Stenmark	(Austria) Dietmar Kohlbichler (Liechtenstein) Andreas Wenzel
540	17	19 January 1986	(Austria) Kitzbühel	KB _{044}	(Switzerland) Pirmin Zurbriggen	(Liechtenstein) Andreas Wenzel	(West Germany) Markus Wasmeier
541	18	21 January 1986	(Switzerland) Parpan	SL _{171}	(France) Didier Bouvet	(Sweden) Ingemar Stenmark	(Switzerland) Thomas Bürgler
542	19	25 January 1986	(Austria) St. Anton	SL _{172}	(Sweden) Ingemar Stenmark	(Socialist Federal Republic of Yugoslavia) Rok Petrovič	(Sweden) Jonas Nilsson
543	20	28 January 1986	(Switzerland) Adelboden	GS _{154}	(Italy) Richard Pramotton	(Italy) Marco Tonazzi	(Austria) Hubert Strolz
544	21	2 February 1986	(Switzerland) Wengen	SL _{173}	(Socialist Federal Republic of Yugoslavia) Rok Petrovič	(France) Didier Bouvet	(Socialist Federal Republic of Yugoslavia) Bojan Križaj
545	22	3 February 1986	(Switzerland) Crans-Montana	SG _{013}	(Switzerland) Peter Müller	(Switzerland) Pirmin Zurbriggen	(West Germany) Markus Wasmeier
546	23	7 December 1985; 3 February 1986	(France) Val d'Isère (DH) (Switzerland) Crans-Montana (SG1)	KB _{045}	(Switzerland) Peter Müller	(Italy) Michael Mair	(Switzerland) Karl Alpiger
547	24	5 February 1986	(Switzerland) Crans-Montana	SG _{014}	(Luxembourg) Marc Girardelli	(West Germany) Markus Wasmeier	(Switzerland) Peter Müller
548	25	7 February 1986	(France) Morzine	DH _{161}	(Austria) Anton Steiner	(Switzerland) Gustav Oehrli	(Austria) Peter Wirnsberger
549	26	25 January 1986; 7 February 1986	(Austria) St. Anton (SL) (France) Morzine (DH1)	KB _{046}	(Luxembourg) Marc Girardelli	(Austria) Leonhard Stock	(Switzerland) Gustav Oehrli
550	27	8 February 1986	(France) Morzine	DH _{162}	(Switzerland) Peter Müller	(Austria) Leonhard Stock	(Norway) Atle Skårdal
551	28	9 February 1986	(France) Morzine	SG _{015}	(West Germany) Markus Wasmeier	(Luxembourg) Marc Girardelli	(Austria) Hubert Strolz
552	29	9 February 1986	(France) Morzine	KB _{047}	(West Germany) Markus Wasmeier	(Austria) Leonhard Stock	(Switzerland) Peter Müller
553	30	21 February 1986	(Sweden) Åre	DH _{163}	(Switzerland) Peter Müller	(Italy) Michael Mair	(Luxembourg) Marc Girardelli
554	31	2 February 1986; 21 February 1986	(Switzerland) Wengen (SL) (Sweden) Åre (DH1)	KB _{048}	(Austria) Günther Mader	(Liechtenstein) Andreas Wenzel	(Switzerland) Gustav Oehrli
555	32	22 February 1986	(Sweden) Åre	DH _{164}	(Switzerland) Franz Heinzer	(Luxembourg) Marc Girardelli	(Austria) Armin Assinger
556	33	23 February 1986	(Sweden) Åre	SL _{174}	(Switzerland) Pirmin Zurbriggen	(Liechtenstein) Paul Frommelt	(Sweden) Jonas Nilsson
557	34	23 February 1986	(Sweden) Åre	KB _{049}	(Switzerland) Pirmin Zurbriggen	(West Germany) Markus Wasmeier	(Austria) Leonhard Stock
558	35	25 February 1986	(Norway) Lillehammer	SL _{175}	(Socialist Federal Republic of Yugoslavia) Rok Petrovič	(Sweden) Ingemar Stenmark	(Luxembourg) Marc Girardelli
559	36	27 February 1986	(Norway) Hemsedal	GS _{155}	(Sweden) Ingemar Stenmark	(West Germany) Hans Stuffer	(Austria) Hubert Strolz
560	37	28 February 1986	(Norway) Hemsedal	SG _{016}	(Switzerland) Pirmin Zurbriggen	(West Germany) Markus Wasmeier	(Austria) Leonhard Stock
561	38	2 March 1986	(Norway) Geilo	SL _{176}	(Austria) Günther Mader	(Liechtenstein) Paul Frommelt	(Socialist Federal Republic of Yugoslavia) Rok Petrovič
562	39	8 March 1986	(United States) Aspen	DH _{165}	(Switzerland) Peter Müller	(Austria) Peter Wirnsberger	(Austria) Leonhard Stock
563	40	11 March 1986	(United States) Heavenly Valley	SL _{177}	(Socialist Federal Republic of Yugoslavia) Rok Petrovič	(Switzerland) Pirmin Zurbriggen	(Sweden) Ingemar Stenmark
564	41	15 March 1986	(Canada) Whistler	DH _{166}	(Austria) Anton Steiner	(Italy) Michael Mair	(Austria) Leonhard Stock
565	42	16 March 1986	(Canada) Whistler	SG _{017}	(West Germany) Markus Wasmeier	(Switzerland) Martin Hangl	(West Germany) Peter Roth
566	43	18 March 1986	(United States) Lake Placid	GS _{156}	(Sweden) Ingemar Stenmark	(Austria) Hubert Strolz	(Italy) Roberto Erlacher
567	44	19 March 1986	(United States) Lake Placid	GS _{157}	(Switzerland) Joël Gaspoz	(Italy) Roberto Erlacher	(Austria) Hubert Strolz
568	45	21 March 1986	(Canada) Bromont	SL _{178}	(Socialist Federal Republic of Yugoslavia) Bojan Križaj	(Liechtenstein) Paul Frommelt	(Switzerland) Pirmin Zurbriggen
Nations Cup		22 March 1986	(Canada) Bromont	PS _{ncr}	(Liechtenstein) Paul Frommelt	(Italy) Marco Tonazzi	(Luxembourg) Marc Girardelli

=== Ladies ===
Event Key: DH – Downhill, SL – Slalom, GS – Giant Slalom, SG – Super Giant Slalom, KB – Combined, PS – Parallel Slalom (Nations Cup ranking only)
Race	Season	Date	Place	Type	Winner	Second	Third
488	1	7 December 1985	(Italy) Sestriere	SG _{009}	(West Germany) Marina Kiehl	(West Germany) Michaela Gerg	(Socialist Federal Republic of Yugoslavia) Mateja Svet
489	2	8 December 1985	(Italy) Sestriere	SL _{165}	(Austria) Roswitha Steiner	(Switzerland) Erika Hess	(Switzerland) Brigitte Örtli
490	3	12 December 1985	(France) Val d'Isère	DH _{132}	(West Germany) Michaela Gerg	(Canada) Laurie Graham	(Switzerland) Maria Walliser
491	4	8 December 1985; 12 December 1985	(Italy) Sestriere (SL) (France) Val d'Isère (DH1)	KB _{041}	(Switzerland) Erika Hess	(Switzerland) Brigitte Örtli	(Switzerland) Maria Walliser
492	5	13 December 1985	(France) Val d'Isère	DH _{133}	(Canada) Laurie Graham	(Switzerland) Maria Walliser	(West Germany) Michaela Gerg
493	6	15 December 1985	(Switzerland) Savognin	SL _{166}	(Switzerland) Erika Hess	(Switzerland) Brigitte Gadient	(Italy) Nadia Bonfini
494	7	5 January 1986	(Socialist Federal Republic of Yugoslavia) Maribor	SL _{167}	(Austria) Roswitha Steiner	(Switzerland) Erika Hess	(Austria) Ida Ladstätter
495	8	6 January 1986	(Socialist Federal Republic of Yugoslavia) Maribor	GS _{144}	(Switzerland) Vreni Schneider	(Switzerland) Michela Figini	(West Germany) Marina Kiehl
496	9	13 December 1985; 6 January 1986	(France) Val d'Isère (DH) (Socialist Federal Republic of Yugoslavia) Maribor (GS)	KB _{042}	(Switzerland) Michela Figini	(Switzerland) Maria Walliser	(West Germany) Marina Kiehl
497	10	10 January 1986	(Austria) Bad Gastein	DH _{134}	(Austria) Katrin Gutensohn	(Canada) Liisa Savijarvi	(Canada) Laurie Graham
498	11	11 January 1986	(Austria) Bad Gastein	DH _{135}	(Switzerland) Maria Walliser	(Austria) Sieglinde Winkler	(Austria) Katrin Gutensohn
499	12	12 January 1986	(Austria) Bad Gastein	SL _{168}	(Austria) Anni Kronbichler	(Switzerland) Erika Hess	(Switzerland) Vreni Schneider
500	13	12 January 1986	(Austria) Bad Gastein	KB _{043}	(Switzerland) Maria Walliser	(Switzerland) Erika Hess	(Switzerland) Brigitte Örtli
501	14	16 January 1986	(France) Puy St. Vincent	DH _{136}	(Austria) Katrin Gutensohn	(Switzerland) Brigitte Örtli	(Canada) Laurie Graham
502	15	17 January 1986	(France) Puy St. Vincent	SG _{010}	(West Germany) Traudl Hächer	(Switzerland) Maria Walliser	(Switzerland) Vreni Schneider
503	16	19 January 1986	(West Germany) Oberstaufen	GS _{145}	(Switzerland) Vreni Schneider	(West Germany) Michaela Gerg	(Switzerland) Michela Figini
504	17	20 January 1986	(West Germany) Oberstaufen	GS _{146}	(West Germany) Traudl Hächer	(Switzerland) Vreni Schneider	(Czechoslovakia) Olga Charvátová
505	18	25 January 1986	(France) Megève	SG _{011}	(Italy) Michaela Marzola	(Austria) Elisabeth Kirchler	(West Germany) Traudl Hächer
506	19	26 January 1986	(France) St. Gervais	SL _{169}	(Austria) Roswitha Steiner	(France) Perrine Pelen	(Socialist Federal Republic of Yugoslavia) Mateja Svet
507	20	25 January 1986; 26 January 1986	(France) Megève (SG) (France) St. Gervais (SL)	KB _{044}	(Switzerland) Monika Hess	(Switzerland) Corinne Schmidhauser	(Austria) Anita Wachter
508	21	1 February 1986	(Switzerland) Crans-Montana	DH _{137}	(Canada) Laurie Graham	(Switzerland) Brigitte Örtli	(Austria) Katrin Gutensohn
509	22	2 February 1986	(Switzerland) Crans-Montana	DH _{138}	(Austria) Katrin Gutensohn	(Switzerland) Maria Walliser	(Switzerland) Zoë Haas
510	23	4 February 1986	(Italy) Piancavallo	SL _{170}	(Czechoslovakia) Olga Charvátová	(France) Perrine Pelen	(Switzerland) Brigitte Örtli
511	24	5 February 1986	(Italy) Val Zoldana	GS _{147}	(Switzerland) Maria Walliser	(Socialist Federal Republic of Yugoslavia) Mateja Svet	(Czechoslovakia) Olga Charvátová
512	25	8 February 1986	(Czechoslovakia) Vysoké Tatry	GS _{148}	(Socialist Federal Republic of Yugoslavia) Mateja Svet	(Spain) Blanca Fernández Ochoa	(West Germany) Traudl Hächer
513	26	9 February 1986	(Czechoslovakia) Vysoké Tatry	SL _{171}	(Switzerland) Corinne Schmidhauser	(Italy) Nadia Bonfini	(Switzerland) Erika Hess
514	27	1 March 1986	(Japan) Furano	DH _{139}	(Switzerland) Maria Walliser	(Switzerland) Brigitte Örtli	(Canada) Laurie Graham
515	28	2 March 1986	(Japan) Furano	SG _{012}	(Canada) Liisa Savijarvi	(Austria) Sieglinde Winkler	(United States) Pam Fletcher
516	29	8 March 1986	(Canada) Sunshine	DH _{140}	(Switzerland) Maria Walliser	(Austria) Katrin Gutensohn	(Canada) Karen Percy
517	30	9 March 1986	(Canada) Sunshine	GS _{149}	(West Germany) Traudl Hächer	(Switzerland) Maria Walliser	(Socialist Federal Republic of Yugoslavia) Katra Zajc
518	31	9 March 1986	(Canada) Sunshine	KB _{045}	(Switzerland) Maria Walliser	(West Germany) Traudl Hächer	(Switzerland) Heidi Zeller
519	32	11 March 1986	(United States) Park City	SL _{172}	(Switzerland) Erika Hess	(Czechoslovakia) Olga Charvátová	(France) Perrine Pelen
520	33	15 March 1986	(United States) Vail	DH _{141}	(United States) Pam Fletcher	(Canada) Laurie Graham	(Switzerland) Maria Walliser
521	34	16 March 1986	(United States) Vail	SG _{013}	(West Germany) Marina Kiehl	(Austria) Anita Wachter	(Canada) Liisa Savijarvi
522	35	18 March 1986	(United States) Waterville Valley	SL _{173}	(Austria) Roswitha Steiner	(Poland) Małgorzata Tlałka-Mogore	(Switzerland) Erika Hess
523	36	20 March 1986	(United States) Waterville Valley	GS _{150}	(Switzerland) Vreni Schneider	(Austria) Anita Wachter	(Czechoslovakia) Olga Charvátová
524	37	22 March 1986	(Canada) Bromont	GS _{151}	(Socialist Federal Republic of Yugoslavia) Mateja Svet	(Czechoslovakia) Olga Charvátová	(Switzerland) Vreni Schneider
Nations Cup		23 March 1986	(Canada) Bromont	PS _{ncr}	(Switzerland) Vreni Schneider	(Switzerland) Maria Walliser	(Switzerland) Corinne Schmidhauser

== Men ==
=== Overall ===
see complete table

In Men's Overall World Cup 1985/86 the best five downhills, the best three Super Gs, best five giant slaloms, best five slaloms and best three combined count. The two parallel slaloms did not count for the Overall World Cup. 30 racers had a point deduction.

Place	Name	Country	Total	DH	SG	GS	SL	KB
1	Marc Girardelli	Luxembourg	294	76	56	57	45	60
2	Pirmin Zurbriggen	Switzerland	284	55	55	30	79	65
3	Markus Wasmeier	West Germany	214	41	70	34	9	60
4	Peter Müller	Switzerland	204	115	40	0	0	49
5	Ingemar Stenmark	Sweden	196	0	0	96	100	0
6	Leonhard Stock	Austria	174	74	35	10	0	55
7	Rok Petrovič	Yugoslavia	170	0	0	45	125	0
8	Peter Wirnsberger	Austria	148	120	0	0	0	28
9	Hubert Strolz	Austria	147	0	29	90	28	0
10	Günther Mader	Austria	143	0	20	24	66	33
11	Michael Mair	Italy	129	92	10	0	0	27
12	Robert Erlacher	Italy	125	0	21	77	27	0
13	Franz Heinzer	Switzerland	124	68	24	0	0	32
14	Andreas Wenzel	Liechtenstein	119	6	8	12	43	50
15	Bojan Križaj	Yugoslavia	115	0	0	15	100	0
16	Richard Pramotton	Italy	111	0	13	52	38	8
17	Karl Alpiger	Switzerland	110	75	20	0	0	15
18	Anton Steiner	Austria	109	71	6	0	0	32
19	Joël Gaspoz	Switzerland	101	0	0	97	4	0
20	Paul Frommelt	Liechtenstein	100	0	0	0	100	0

=== Downhill ===
see complete table

In Men's Downhill World Cup 1985/86 the best 5 results count. 15 racers had a point deduction, which are given in ().

Place	Name	Country	Total	1	2	4	5	11	15	16	26	28	31	33	40	42
1	Peter Wirnsberger	Austria	120	(9)	(12)	(15)	25	25	25	25	(15)	-	(4)	-	20	(5)
2	Peter Müller	Switzerland	115	(12)	20	(12)	20	(20)	-	(4)	(10)	25	25	-	25	-
3	Michael Mair	Italy	92	-	-	25	(10)	12	(1)	15	(9)	(8)	20	(5)	(1)	20
4	Marc Girardelli	Luxembourg	76	(6)	(7)	20	-	11	-	-	-	-	15	20	10	(8)
5	Karl Alpiger	Switzerland	75	25	25	4	(1)	-	-	-	-	-	12	9	(2)	(3)
6	Leonhard Stock	Austria	74	-	-	(7)	12	-	-	-	(11)	20	(2)	12	15	15
7	Erwin Resch	Austria	72	-	-	(5)	7	15	20	20	(4)	10	-	-	(1)	-
8	Anton Steiner	Austria	71	(2)	-	9	-	6	-	(1)	25	-	6	(2)	(5)	25
9	Franz Heinzer	Switzerland	68	(4)	-	-	11	(8)	-	12	-	(2)	(5)	25	9	11
10	Gustav Oehrli	Switzerland	57	-	-	-	8	-	7	11	20	11	-	-	(6)	-

=== Super G ===
see complete table

In Men's Super G World Cup 1985/86 all 5 results count. This was the first ever Super G World Cup! It started late, when the first race was held at the beginning of February. Markus Wasmeier was able to finish every race on the podium and won the cup.

Place	Name	Country	Total	23	25	29	38	43
1	Markus Wasmeier	West Germany	105	15	20	25	20	25
2	Pirmin Zurbriggen	Switzerland	67	20	5	10	25	7
3	Marc Girardelli	Luxembourg	56	-	25	20	11	-
4	Leonhard Stock	Austria	52	9	11	8	15	9
5	Peter Müller	Switzerland	40	25	15	-	-	-
6	Martin Hangl	Switzerland	34	6	1	7	-	20
7	Michael Eder	West Germany	30	-	11	5	3	11
8	Hubert Strolz	Austria	29	7	7	15	-	-
	Hans Enn	Austria	29	-	6	11	-	12
10	Franz Heinzer	Switzerland	24	12	12	-	-	-

=== Giant Slalom ===
see complete table

In Men's Giant Slalom World Cup 1985/86 the best 5 results count. Three racer had a point deduction, which is given in ().

Place	Name	Country	Total	6	9	12	21	37	44	45
1	Joël Gaspoz	Switzerland	97	11	25	25	(1)	11	(11)	25
2	Ingemar Stenmark	Sweden	96	25	9	(8)	-	25	25	12
3	Hubert Strolz	Austria	90	20	15	20	15	(15)	20	(15)
4	Robert Erlacher	Italy	77	15	20	7	-	-	15	20
5	Marc Girardelli	Luxembourg	57	10	12	12	11	12	-	-
6	Richard Pramotton	Italy	52	9	-	9	25	8	1	-
7	Rok Petrovič	Yugoslavia	45	12	-	6	12	10	-	5
8	Markus Wasmeier	West Germany	34	-	-	15	7	-	2	10
9	Marco Tonazzi	Italy	33	8	5	-	20	-	-	-
10	Pirmin Zurbriggen	Switzerland	30	-	-	5	4	-	10	11

=== Slalom ===
see complete table

In Men's Slalom World Cup 1985/86 the best 5 results count. 11 racers had a point deduction, which are given in (). Rok Petrovič won the cup with maximum points.

Place	Name	Country	Total	3	8	10	14	17	19	20	22	34	36	39	41	46
1	Rok Petrovič	Yugoslavia	125	25	-	25	-	-	-	(20)	25	-	25	(15)	25	-
2	Ingemar Stenmark	Sweden	100	(10)	-	-	(10)	20	20	25	-	-	20	-	15	-
	Bojan Križaj	Yugoslavia	100	20	20	-	20	-	-	-	15	(12)	(8)	-	-	25
	Paul Frommelt	Liechtenstein	100	-	15	(11)	(9)	25	-	(11)	-	20	(10)	20	-	20
5	Jonas Nilsson	Sweden	87	12	25	20	-	-	(11)	15	-	15	-	-	-	-
6	Pirmin Zurbriggen	Switzerland	79	-	-	-	-	7	-	(2)	-	25	(7)	12	20	15
7	Didier Bouvet	France	72	-	-	7	-	-	25	9	20	-	-	11	-	-
8	Günther Mader	Austria	66	(7)	9	-	(8)	10	-	-	10	-	12	25	-	-
9	Ivano Edalini	Italy	55	15	12	-	-	-	8	-	12	-	(6)	-	-	8
10	Dietmar Köhlbichler	Austria	47	11	-	(3)	4	15	9	-	-	-	-	8	-	-
11	Marc Girardelli	Luxembourg	45	-	-	-	6	-	-	12	-	-	15	-	12	-
12	Andreas Wenzel	Liechtenstein	43	-	-	-	11	15	-	3	3	-	-	-	-	11
13	Johan Wallner	Sweden	42	-	8	-	25	-	-	-	-	-	-	9	-	-

=== Combined ===
see complete table

In Men's Combined World Cup 1985/86 the best 3 results count. Ten racer had a point deduction, which is given in ().

Place	Name	Country	Total	7	18	24	27	30	32	35
1	Pirmin Zurbriggen	Switzerland	65	15	25	-	-	(12)	-	25
2	Marc Girardelli	Luxembourg	60	25	-	10	25	-	-	-
	Markus Wasmeier	West Germany	60	-	15	(12)	(12)	25	(6)	20
4	Leonhard Stock	Austria	55	(12)	-	(9)	20	20	(12)	15
5	Andreas Wenzel	Liechtenstein	50	10	20	-	-	-	20	-
6	Peter Müller	Switzerland	49	(6)	9	25	(6)	15	-	-
7	Günther Mader	Austria	33	-	-	-	-	8	25	-
8	Franz Heinzer	Switzerland	32	11	(8)	11	(3)	10	(7)	-
	Anton Steiner	Austria	32	(5)	12	(3)	-	(3)	11	9
10	Gustav Oehrli	Switzerland	30	-	-	-	15	-	15	-

== Ladies ==
=== Overall ===
see complete table

In Women's Overall World Cup 1985/86 the best five downhills, the best three Super Gs, best five giant slaloms, best five slaloms and best three combined count. The parallel slalom only counts for the Nationscup (or was a show-event). 19 racers had a point deduction.

Place	Name	Country	Total	DH	SG	GS	SL	KB
1	Maria Walliser	Switzerland	287	115	24	76	2	70
2	Erika Hess	Switzerland	242	13	11	52	110	56
3	Vreni Schneider	Switzerland	216	0	20	110	51	35
4	Olga Charvátová	Czechoslovakia	199	21	28	72	56	22
5	Brigitte Örtli	Switzerland	181	82	0	6	52	41
6	Michela Figini	Switzerland	178	53	24	58	0	43
7	Mateja Svet	Yugoslavia	159	0	19	84	49	7
8	Marina Kiehl	West Germany	157	43	60	31	0	23
9	Traudl Hächer	West Germany	153	0	40	88	0	25
10	Michaela Gerg	West Germany	151	48	37	41	0	25
11	Katrin Gutensohn	Austria	145	110	12	0	0	23
12	Liisa Savijarvi	Canada	136	65	49	12	0	10
13	Perrine Pelen	France	117	0	0	30	77	10
14	Laurie Graham	Canada	116	105	11	0	0	0
15	Roswitha Steiner	Austria	110	0	0	0	110	0
16	Sigrid Wolf	Austria	93	35	24	24	0	10
17	Anita Wachter	Austria	91	0	28	43	2	18
18	Sylvia Eder	Austria	90	34	12	16	9	19
19	Heidi Zeller	Switzerland	81	41	0	10	0	30
20	Regine Mösenlechner	West Germany	80	44	14	10	0	12

=== Downhill ===
see complete table

In Women's Downhill World Cup 1985/86 the best 5 results count. Ten racers had a point deduction, which are given in ().

Place	Name	Country	Total	3	5	10	11	14	21	22	27	29	33
1	Maria Walliser	Switzerland	115	(15)	20	(12)	25	(8)	(12)	20	25	25	(15)
2	Katrin Gutensohn	Austria	110	(12)	(11)	25	15	25	(15)	25	(11)	20	(9)
3	Laurie Graham	Canada	105	20	25	15	-	(15)	25	(12)	(15)	-	20
4	Brigitte Örtli	Switzerland	82	-	(3)	-	10	20	20	12	20	-	-
5	Liisa Savijarvi	Canada	65	-	(6)	20	9	(1)	-	-	12	12	12
6	Michela Figini	Switzerland	53	10	12	(4)	-	-	11	10	10	-	-
7	Michaela Gerg	West Germany	48	25	15	-	-	-	-	8	-	-	-
8	Pam Fletcher	United States	46	-	-	-	-	3	-	-	9	9	25
9	Regine Mösenlechner	West Germany	44	(1)	(5)	9	12	6	10	(4)	-	-	7
10	Marina Kiehl	West Germany	43	8	8	(6)	(4)	10	(3)	9	-	8	-

=== Super G ===
see complete table

In Women's Super G World Cup 1985/86 all 5 results count. This was the first ever Super G World Cup!

Place	Name	Country	Total	1	15	18	28	34
1	Marina Kiehl	West Germany	75	25	5	10	10	25
2	Liisa Savijarvi	Canada	56	-	9	7	25	15
3	Michaela Marzola	Italy	47	10	6	25	6	-
4	Traudl Hächer	West Germany	40	-	25	15	-	-
5	Michaela Gerg	West Germany	37	20	-	-	5	12
6	Olga Charvátová	Czechoslovakia	31	-	3	11	11	6
7	Anne Flore Rey	France	30	9	12	9	-	-
	Anita Wachter	Austria	30	-	4	4	2	20
	Catherine Quittet	France	30	7	11	3	-	9
10	Michela Figini	Switzerland	24	-	10	6	8	-
	Sigrid Wolf	Austria	24	-	-	5	9	10
	Maria Walliser	Switzerland	24	-	20	-	-	4

=== Giant Slalom ===
see complete table

In Women's Giant Slalom World Cup 1985/86 the best five results count. Three racers had a point deduction, which are given in ().

Place	Name	Country	Total	8	16	17	24	25	30	36	37
1	Vreni Schneider	Switzerland	110	25	25	20	-	-	-	25	15
2	Traudl Hächer	West Germany	88	11	-	25	12	15	25	-	-
3	Mateja Svet	Yugoslavia	84	9	5	(5)	20	25	-	-	25
4	Maria Walliser	Switzerland	76	10	-	-	25	9	20	-	12
5	Olga Charvátová	Czechoslovakia	72	(3)	(2)	15	15	-	7	15	20
6	Michela Figini	Switzerland	58	20	15	12	10	-	-	1	-
7	Erika Hess	Switzerland	52	(4)	12	11	7	12	(6)	10	-
8	Anita Wachter	Austria	43	5	11	3	-	-	4	20	-
9	Michaela Gerg	West Germany	41	12	20	-	2	-	-	-	7
10	Blanca Fernández Ochoa	Spain	37	7	-	-	-	20	9	-	1

=== Slalom ===
see complete table

In Women's Slalom World Cup 1985/86 the best 5 results count. Five racers had a point deduction, which are given in (). Roswitha Steiner won the Slalom World Cup discipline because she had more wins (4) than Erika Hess (2).

Place	Name	Country	Total	2	6	7	12	19	23	26	32	35
1	Roswitha Steiner	Austria	110	25	-	25	-	25	(8)	10	(10)	25
2	Erika Hess	Switzerland	110	20	25	20	20	(12)	(10)	(15)	25	(15)
3	Perrine Pelen	France	77	(8)	11	-	-	20	20	(8)	15	11
4	Olga Charvátová	Czechoslovakia	56	-	-	-	11	-	25	-	20	-
5	Ida Ladstätter	Austria	52	-	-	15	12	10	6	-	-	9
6	Brigitte Örtli	Switzerland	52	15	-	-	6	-	15	(3)	9	7
7	Małgorzata Tlałka-Mogore	Poland	51	-	-	-	-	11	9	-	11	20
	Vreni Schneider	Switzerland	51	9	12	9	15	-	-	-	-	6
9	Corinne Schmidhauser	Switzerland	49	-	-	4	-	8	-	25	-	12
	Mateja Svet	Yugoslavia	49	-	7	-	5	15	12	-	-	10
11	Brigitte Gadient	Switzerland	44	-	20	12	-	-	-	12	-	-
	Anni Kronbichler	Austria	44	-	-	-	25	-	7	9	-	3

=== Combined ===
see complete table

In Women's Combined World Cup 1985/86 the best 3 results count. Three racers had a point deduction, which are given in (). Swiss athletes dominated and were able to win all five competitions.

Place	Name	Country	Total	4	9	13	20	31
1	Maria Walliser	Switzerland	70	(15)	20	25	-	25
2	Erika Hess	Switzerland	56	25	(7)	20	-	11
3	Michela Figini	Switzerland	43	10	25	-	8	-
4	Brigitte Örtli	Switzerland	41	20	-	15	-	6
5	Vreni Schneider	Switzerland	35	12	11	12	-	-
6	Heidi Zeller	Switzerland	30	-	8	7	-	15
7	Erika Hess	Switzerland	25	-	-	-	25	-
	Michaela Gerg	West Germany	25	-	12	10	3	-
	Traudl Hächer	West Germany	25	-	-	-	5	20
10	Marina Kiehl	West Germany	23	4	15	4	-	-
	Katrin Gutensohn	Austria	23	8	3	-	(1)	12

== Nations Cup ==
=== Overall ===
Place	Country	Total	Men	Ladies
1	Switzerland	3032	1450	1582
2	Austria	2531	1531	1000
3	West Germany	1267	550	717
4	Italy	987	788	199
5	Yugoslavia	634	416	218
6	France	562	259	303
7	Sweden	522	476	46
8	United States	441	150	291
9	Canada	437	46	391
10	Luxembourg	322	322	0
11	Liechtenstein	286	286	0
12	Czechoslovakia	221	14	207
13	Poland	75	0	75
14	Spain	54	3	51
15	United Kingdom	46	46	0
16	Norway	38	38	0
17	Netherlands	31	0	31
18	Bulgaria	15	15	0
19	Australia	8	8	0
20	Japan	6	6	0

=== Men ===
All points were shown including individual deduction. It is only shown the parallel slalom result from the race at Vienna, which is certain to count for the Nationscup. But without the parallel slalom race held at Bromont, because result ? (Also possible, that this parallel slalom was only a show-event.)

Place	Country	Total	DH	SG	GS	SL	KB	PS	Racers	Wins
1	Austria	1531	625	151	188	271	263	33	26	8
2	Switzerland	1450	573	196	183	152	310	36	17	15
3	Italy	788	199	59	209	234	43	44	15	2
4	West Germany	550	62	208	87	64	109	20	12	3
5	Sweden	476	9	0	122	315	30	0	9	6
6	Yugoslavia	416	0	0	71	331	0	14	5	6
7	Luxembourg	322	97	56	57	45	60	7	1	3
8	Liechtenstein	286	6	16	12	184	50	18	3	1
9	France	259	45	10	34	125	45	0	8	1
10	United States	150	78	0	4	43	25	0	7	0
11	United Kingdom	46	37	0	0	0	9	0	2	0
	Canada	46	46	0	0	0	0	0	5	0
13	Norway	38	25	0	0	13	0	0	3	0
14	Bulgaria	15	0	0	0	15	0	0	1	0
15	Czechoslovakia	14	0	0	0	1	13	0	2	0
16	Australia	8	0	0	0	0	8	0	1	0
17	Japan	6	0	0	0	6	0	0	2	0
18	Spain	3	0	0	0	3	0	0	1	0

=== Ladies ===
All points were shown including individual deduction. But without parallel slalom, because result ? (Also possible, that the parallel slalom was only a show-event.)

Place	Country	Total	DH	SG	GS	SL	KB	Racers	Wins
1	Switzerland	1582	427	80	334	383	358	13	15
2	Austria	1000	318	124	143	342	73	18	8
3	West Germany	717	203	180	202	26	106	11	6
4	Canada	391	249	79	45	0	18	6	3
5	France	303	31	62	86	109	15	7	0
6	United States	291	106	48	34	56	47	10	1
7	Yugoslavia	218	0	19	115	77	7	6	2
8	Czechoslovakia	207	21	31	77	56	22	1	1
9	Italy	199	27	55	0	105	12	8	1
10	Poland	75	0	0	7	59	9	2	0
11	Spain	51	0	2	37	0	12	1	0
12	Sweden	46	0	0	24	22	0	3	0
13	Netherlands	31	0	12	0	8	11	1	0
