= 1986 Alpine Skiing World Cup – Women's super-G =

Alpine Ski discipline cup season

1986 Women's Super-G Cup: 1986 Women's World Cup; Overall • downhill • Super-G; giant slalom • Slalom • Combined
Previous: 1985	Next: 1987

The Women's super-G World Cup 1986 involved 5 events.

== Standings ==
#	Skier	Races	Wins	Top 3	Top 10	Top 30	07-12-1985 Sestriere (Italy)	17-01-1986 Puy St. Vincent (France)	25-01-1986 Megève (France)	02-03-1986 Furano (Japan)	16-03-1986 Vail (United States)	Points
1	(Germany) Marina Kiehl	5	2	2	4	5	25	5	10	10	25	75
2	(Canada) Liisa Savijarvi	4	1	2	4	4	-	9	7	25	15	56
3	(Italy) Michaela Marzola	4	1	1	4	4	10	6	25	6	-	47
4	(Germany) Traudl Haecher Gavet	2	1	2	2	2	-	25	15	-	-	40
5	(Germany) Michaela Gerg-Leitner	3	-	1	2	3	20	-	-	5	12	37
6	(Czech Republic) Olga Charvatova	4	-	-	3	4	-	3	11	11	6	31
7	(France) Catherine Quittet	4	-	-	3	4	7	11	3	-	9	30
7	(France) Anne Flore Rey	3	-	-	3	3	9	12	9	-	-	30
7	(Austria) Anita Wachter	4	-	1	1	4	-	4	4	2	20	30
10	(Switzerland) Michela Figini	3	-	-	3	3	-	10	6	8	-	24
10	(Switzerland) Maria Walliser	2	-	1	1	2	-	20	-	-	4	24
10	(Austria) Sigrid Wolf	3	-	-	2	3	-	-	5	9	10	24
13	(Austria) Elisabeth Kirchler	2	-	1	1	2	-	-	20	1	-	21
14	(Switzerland) Vreni Schneider	2	-	1	1	2	5	15	-	-	-	20
14	(Austria) Sieglinde Winkler	1	-	1	1	1	-	-	-	20	-	20
16	(Slovenia) Mateja Svet	2	-	1	1	2	15	-	-	-	4	19
17	(United States) Eva Twardokens	2	-	-	2	2	11	7	-	-	-	18
18	(United States) Pam Fletcher	1	-	1	1	1	-	-	-	15	-	15
19	(Germany) Regine Moesenlechner	2	-	-	2	2	6	8	-	-	-	14
20	(United States) Debbie Armstrong	1	-	-	1	1	12	-	-	-	-	12
20	(Austria) Sylvia Eder	3	-	-	1	3	1	-	2	-	9	12
20	(Germany) Katharina Gutensohn	1	-	-	1	1	-	-	12	-	-	12
20	(Canada) Diane Haight	1	-	-	1	1	-	-	-	12	-	12
20	(Switzerland) Erika Hess	4	-	-	1	4	3	-	1	7	1	12
20	(Germany) Christa Kinshofer	2	-	-	1	2	4	-	8	-	-	12
26	(Germany) Karin Dedler	2	-	-	1	2	-	-	-	4	7	11
26	(Canada) Laurie Graham	1	-	-	1	1	-	-	-	-	11	11
28	(Italy) Karla Delago	1	-	-	1	1	8	-	-	-	-	8
29	(Austria) Veronika Vitzthum	1	-	-	-	1	-	-	-	-	5	5
30	(Germany) Heidi Wiesler	1	-	-	-	1	-	-	-	3	-	3
31	(Spain) Blanca Fernandez-Ochoa	1	-	-	-	1	2	-	-	-	-	2
31	(United States) Tamara McKinney	1	-	-	-	1	-	2	-	-	-	2
31	(France) Carole Merle	1	-	-	-	1	-	-	-	-	2	2
34	(United States) Holly Beth Flanders	1	-	-	-	1	-	1	-	-	-	1
