= 1986 Alpine Skiing World Cup – Women's combined =

Alpine Ski discipline cup season

1986 Women's Combined Cup: 1986 Women's World Cup; Overall • downhill • Super-G; giant slalom • slalom • Combined
Previous: 1985	Next: 1987

The Women's combined World Cup 1986 involved 4 events.

== Standings ==
In women's combined World Cup 1985/86 the best 3 results count. Deductions are given in ().

Place	Name	Country	Total points	Deduction	4 (Italy) (France)	9 (France) (Socialist Federal Republic of Yugoslavia)	13 (Austria)	20 (France)	31 (Canada)
1	Maria Walliser	Switzerland	70	(15)	(15)	20	25	-	25
2	Erika Hess	Switzerland	56	(7)	25	(7)	20	-	11
3	Michela Figini	Switzerland	43		10	25	-	8	-
4	Brigitte Oertli	Switzerland	41		20	-	15	-	6
5	Vreni Schneider	Switzerland	35		12	11	12	-	-
6	Heidi Zeller	Switzerland	30		-	8	7	-	15
7	Monika Hess	Switzerland	25		-	-	-	25	-
	Michaela Gerg	West Germany	25		-	12	10	3	-
	Traudl Hächer	West Germany	25		-	-	-	5	20
10	Marina Kiehl	West Germany	23		4	15	4	-	-
	Katrin Gutensohn	Austria	23	(1)	8	3	-	(1)	12
12	Olga Charvátová	Czechoslovakia	22		9	2	11	-	-
13	Corinne Schmidhauser	Switzerland	20		-	-	-	20	-
14	Sylvia Eder	Austria	19		11	-	-	6	2
15	Anita Wachter	Austria	18		-	-	-	15	3
16	Zoe Haas	Switzerland	16		-	9	-	-	7
17	Debbie Armstrong	United States	15		5	10	-	-	-
	Eva Twardokens	United States	15		3	-	-	12	-
19	Regine Mösenlechner	West Germany	12		6	6	-	-	-
	Blanca Fernández Ochoa	Spain	12		-	-	8	4	-
21	Christa Kinshofer	Netherlands	11		-	-	-	11	-
22	Liisa Savijarvi	Canada	10		-	5	5	-	-
	Perrine Pelen	France	10		-	-	-	10	-
	Sigrid Wolf	Austria	10		-	-	-	-	10
25	Karla Delago	Italy	9		-	-	9	-	-
	Małgorzata Tlałka	Poland	9		-	-	-	9	-
	Heidi Wiesler	West Germany	9		-	-	-	-	9
28	Tamara McKinney	United States	8		7	1	-	-	-
	Karen Percy	Canada	8		-	-	-	-	8
30	Mateja Svet	Yugoslavia	7		-	-	-	7	-
31	Miriam Vogt	West Germany	6		-	-	6	-	-
32	Anne Flore Rey	France	5		1	4	-	-	-
	Pam Fletcher	United States	5		-	-	-	-	5
34	Holly Flanders	United States	4		-	-	-	-	4
35	Karin Dedler	West Germany	3		-	-	3	-	-
	Nadia Bonfini	Italy	3		2	-	1	-	-
	Katrin Stotz	West Germany	3		-	-	2	-	1
38	Elisabeth Kirchler	Austria	2		-	-	-	2	-

== Team Results ==
All points were shown. bold indicate highest score - italics indicate race wins

Place	Country	Total points	3 (France)	6 (Italy)	16 (Switzerland)	20 (France)	26 (Germany) (Austria)	Racers	Wins
1	Switzerland	358	**82**	80	79	53	64	9	5
2	West Germany	106	10	33	25	8	30	8	0
3	Austria	73	19	3	-	24	27	5	0
4	United States	47	15	11	-	12	9	5	0
5	Czechoslovakia	22	9	2	11	-	-	1	0
6	Canada	18	-	5	5	-	8	2	0
7	France	15	1	4	-	10	-	2	0
8	Spain	12	-	-	8	4	-	1	0
9	Italy	12	2	-	10	-	-	2	0
10	Netherlands	11	-	-	-	11	-	1	0
11	Poland	9	-	-	9	-	-	1	0
12	Yugoslavia	7	-	-	-	7	-	1	0
