= 1986 Alpine Skiing World Cup – Women's giant slalom =

1986 Women's giant slalom World Cup
Previous: 1985	Next: 1987

Women's giant slalom World Cup 1985/1986

== Final point standings ==
In women's giant slalom World Cup 1985/86 the best 5 results count. Deductions are given in ().

Place	Name	Country	Total points	Deduction	8 (Socialist Federal Republic of Yugoslavia)	16 (Germany)	17 (Germany)	24 (Italy)	25 (Czechoslovakia)	30 (Canada)	36 (United States)	37 (Canada)
1	Vreni Schneider	Switzerland	110		25	25	20	-	-	-	25	15
2	Traudl Hächer	West Germany	88		11	-	25	12	15	25	-	-
3	Mateja Svet	Yugoslavia	84	(5)	9	5	(5)	20	25	-	-	25
4	Maria Walliser	Switzerland	76		10	-	-	25	9	20	-	12
5	Olga Charvátová	Czechoslovakia	72	(5)	(3)	(2)	15	15	-	7	15	20
6	Michela Figini	Switzerland	58		20	15	12	10	-	-	1	-
7	Erika Hess	Switzerland	52	(10)	(4)	12	11	7	12	(6)	10	-
8	Anita Wachter	Austria	43		5	11	3	-	-	4	20	-
9	Michaela Gerg	West Germany	41		12	20	-	2	-	-	-	7
10	Blanca Fernández Ochoa	Spain	37		7	-	-	-	20	9	-	1
11	Marina Kiehl	West Germany	31		15	-	-	5	5	-	6	-
12	Perrine Pelen	France	30		-	-	-	8	11	11	-	-
	Carole Merle	France	30		-	-	6	11	2	-	3	8
14	Elisabeth Kirchler	Austria	28		-	-	9	-	-	12	7	-
15	Katra Zajc	Yugoslavia	26		-	-	-	-	-	15	11	-
16	Josée Lacasse	Canada	25		-	-	-	-	-	10	4	11
17	Sigrid Wolf	Austria	24		-	9	-	3	-	1	2	9
18	Ingrid Salvenmoser	Austria	22		1	1	10	-	10	-	-	-
19	Maria Epple	West Germany	19		8	3	8	-	-	-	-	-
20	Tamara McKinney	United States	18		-	10	-	-	8	-	-	-
21	Sylvia Eder	Austria	16		-	-	-	-	-	-	12	4
22	Catharina Glassér-Bjerner	Sweden	15		-	-	-	-	-	-	9	6
23	Anne Flore Rey	France	12		-	6	-	-	6	-	-	-
	Liisa Savijarvi	Canada	12		-	-	-	9	-	-	-	3
25	Eva Twardokens	United States	11		-	4	7	-	-	-	-	-
26	Regine Mösenlechner	West Germany	10		-	8	2	-	-	-	-	-
	Heidi Zeller	Switzerland	10		6	-	-	-	1	3	-	-
	Claudia Strobl	Austria	10		-	-	-	-	-	-	-	10
29	Diane Haight	Canada	8		-	-	-	-	-	8	-	-
	Monika Äijä	Sweden	8		-	-	-	-	-	-	8	-
31	Małgorzata Tlałka	Poland	7		-	7	-	-	-	-	-	-
	Hélène Barbier	France	7		-	-	-	-	7	-	-	-
	Catherine Quittet	France	7		-	-	-	4	3	-	-	-
	Karin Stotz	West Germany	7		-	-	-	-	-	5	-	2
35	Karin Dedler	West Germany	6		-	-	-	6	-	-	-	-
	Brigitte Oertli	Switzerland	6		-	-	-	-	4	2	-	-
37	Zoe Haas	Switzerland	5		-	-	4	1	-	-	-	-
	Beth Madsen	United States	5		-	-	-	-	-	-	5	-
	Regula Betschart	Switzerland	5		-	-	-	-	-	-	-	5
40	Monika Hess	Switzerland	2		2	-	-	-	-	-	-	-
41	Camilla Nilsson	Sweden	1		-	-	1	-	-	-	-	-

== Women's giant slalom team results ==
All points were shown including individuel deduction. bold indicate highest score - italics indicate race wins

Place	Country	Total points	8 (Socialist Federal Republic of Yugoslavia)	16 (Germany)	17 (Germany)	24 (Italy)	25 (Czechoslovakia)	30 (Canada)	36 (United States)	37 (Canada)	Racers	Wins
1	Switzerland	334	**67**	52	47	43	26	31	36	32	9	2
2	West Germany	202	46	31	35	25	20	30	6	9	7	2
3	Austria	143	6	21	22	3	10	17	41	23	6	0
4	Yugoslavia	115	9	5	5	20	25	15	11	25	2	2
5	France	86	-	6	6	23	29	11	3	8	5	0
6	Czechoslovakia	77	3	2	15	15	-	7	15	20	1	0
7	Canada	45	-	-	-	9	-	18	4	14	3	0
8	Spain	37	7	-	-	-	20	9	-	1	1	0
9	United States	34	-	14	7	-	8	-	5	-	3	0
10	Sweden	24	-	-	1	-	-	-	17	6	3	0
11	Poland	7	-	-	7	-	-	-	-	-	1	0

**Alpine skiing World Cup**
**Women**

Overall | Downhill | Super-G | Giant slalom | Slalom | Combined

**1986**
