= 1986 Alpine Skiing World Cup – Men's slalom =

1986 Men's Slalom World Cup
Previous: 1985	Next: 1987

Men's slalom World Cup 1985/1986

== Final point standings ==
In men's slalom World Cup 1985/86 the best 5 results count. Deduction are given in ().

Place	Name	Country	Total points	Deduction	3 (Italy)	8 (Italy)	10 (Socialist Federal Republic of Yugoslavia)	14 (Germany)	17 (Austria)	19 (Switzerland)	20 (Austria)	22 (Switzerland)	34 (Sweden)	36 (Norway)	39 (Norway)	41 (United States)	46 (Canada)
1	Rok Petrović	Yugoslavia	125	(35)	25	-	25	-	-	-	(20)	25	-	25	(15)	25	-
2	Ingemar Stenmark	Sweden	100	(20)	(10)	-	-	(10)	20	20	25	-	-	20	-	15	-
	Bojan Križaj	Yugoslavia	100	(20)	20	20	-	20	-	-	-	15	(12)	(8)	-	-	25
	Paul Frommelt	Liechtenstein	100	(41)	-	15	(11)	(9)	25	-	(11)	-	20	(10)	20	-	20
5	Jonas Nilsson	Sweden	87	(11)	12	25	20	-	-	(11)	15	-	15	-	-	-	-
6	Pirmin Zurbriggen	Switzerland	79	(9)	-	-	-	-	7	-	(2)	-	25	(7)	12	20	15
7	Didier Bouvet	France	72		-	-	7	-	-	25	9	20	-	-	11	-	-
8	Günther Mader	Austria	66	(15)	(7)	9	-	(8)	10	-	-	10	-	12	25	-	-
9	Ivano Edalini	Italy	55	(6)	15	12	-	-	-	8	-	12	-	(6)	-	-	8
10	Dietmar Köhlbichler	Austria	47	(3)	11	-	(3)	4	15	9	-	-	-	-	8	-	-
11	Marc Girardelli	Luxembourg	45		-	-	-	6	-	-	12	-	-	15	-	12	-
12	Andreas Wenzel	Liechtenstein	43		-	-	-	11	15	-	3	3	-	-	-	-	11
13	Johan Wallner	Sweden	42		-	8	-	25	-	-	-	-	-	-	9	-	-
14	Marco Tonazzi	Italy	39	(2)	5	5	-	(2)	-	10	-	-	-	-	-	10	9
15	Richard Pramotton	Italy	38		-	-	12	-	6	-	-	-	-	-	10	-	10
16	Thomas Bürgler	Switzerland	35		9	-	-	1	-	15	10	-	-	-	-	-	-
	Klaus Heidegger	Austria	35		-	7	9	7	9	-	-	-	-	3	-	-	-
18	Christian Gaidet	France	29		-	-	-	-	8	-	6	8	7	-	-	-	-
	Grega Benedik	Yugoslavia	29		4	-	-	-	-	-	-	-	5	11	-	9	-
20	Hubert Strolz	Austria	28		-	11	-	-	-	-	-	-	12	5	-	-	-
21	Robert Erlacher	Italy	27		8	10	-	-	-	-	-	9	-	-	-	-	-
	Robert Zoller	Austria	27		-	6	-	-	-	6	-	-	-	9	6	-	-
	Alex Giorgi	Italy	27		3	-	-	-	-	-	-	11	8	-	-	-	5
24	Mathias Berthold	Austria	25	(3)	6	(2)	-	-	4	7	5	-	-	(1)	3	-	-
25	Tiger Shaw	United States	24		-	-	8	-	2	-	-	6	-	-	-	8	-
26	Paolo De Chiesa	Italy	22		-	-	-	-	11	-	-	-	-	-	-	11	-
27	Josef Schick	West Germany	19		-	-	-	-	-	-	-	7	-	-	-	-	12
28	Jože Kuralt	Yugoslavia	18		-	4	-	-	-	12	-	2	-	-	-	-	-
	Lars-Göran Halvarsson	Sweden	18		-	3	6	-	-	-	-	-	-	2	-	-	7
	Jörgen Sundqvist	Sweden	18		-	-	-	-	-	-	-	-	-	4	8	-	6
	Daniel Mougel	France	18		-	-	-	15	-	1	-	-	-	-	1	-	1
32	Thomas Stangassinger	Austria	15		-	-	15	-	-	-	-	-	-	-	-	-	-
	Petar Popangelov	Bulgaria	15		-	-	-	-	5	6	4	-	-	-	-	-	-
34	Max Julen	Switzerland	14		-	-	10	-	-	-	-	-	-	-	4	-	-
35	Gunnar Neuriesser	Sweden	13		-	-	-	-	-	-	8	5	-	-	-	-	-
36	Felix McGrath	United States	12		-	-	-	12	-	-	-	-	-	-	-	-	-
	Frank Wörndl	West Germany	12		2	-	-	-	-	-	7	-	-	-	-	-	3
38	Finn Christian Jagge	Norway	11		-	-	-	-	-	-	-	-	9	-	2	-	-
39	Alberto Tomba	Italy	10		-	-	-	-	-	-	-	-	10	-	-	-	-
	Florian Beck	West Germany	10		-	-	-	3	-	-	-	-	-	-	-	7	-
41	Markus Wasmeier	West Germany	9		-	-	1	-	-	-	-	-	2	-	-	6	-
42	Oswald Tötsch	Italy	8		-	-	-	-	-	3	-	-	-	-	5	-	-
43	Bengt Fjällberg	Sweden	6		-	-	-	-	-	-	-	-	6	-	-	-	-
	Martin Hangl	Switzerland	6		-	-	4	-	1	-	-	-	1	-	-	-	-
	Peter Roth	West Germany	6		-	-	-	-	-	-	2	-	-	-	-	4	-
46	Chiaki Ishioka	Japan	5		-	-	5	-	-	-	-	-	-	-	-	-	-
	Jean-Daniel Délèze	Switzerland	5		-	-	-	5	-	-	-	-	-	-	-	-	-
	Jack Miller	United States	5		-	-	-	-	-	-	-	-	-	-	-	5	-
49	Christian Orlainsky	Austria	4		-	-	-	-	4	-	-	-	-	-	-	-	-
	Joël Gaspoz	Switzerland	4		-	-	-	-	-	4	-	-	-	-	-	-	-
	Stephan Pistor	West Germany	4		-	-	-	-	-	-	-	4	-	-	-	-	-
	Armin Bittner	West Germany	4		-	-	-	-	-	-	-	-	4	-	-	-	-
	Tomaž Čižman	Yugoslavia	4		-	-	-	-	-	-	-	-	3	-	-	1	-
	Yves Tavernier	France	4		-	-	-	-	-	-	-	-	-	-	-	-	4
55	Luis Fernández Ochoa	Spain	3		-	-	-	-	-	-	-	-	-	-	-	3	-
56	Torjus Berge	Norway	2		-	-	2	-	-	-	-	-	-	-	-	-	-
	Roland Pfeifer	Austria	2		-	-	-	-	-	2	-	-	-	-	-	-	-
	Mike Frost	United States	2		-	-	-	-	-	-	-	-	-	-	-	2	-
	Daniel Fontaine	France	2		-	-	-	-	-	-	-	-	-	-	-	-	2
60	Bernhard Gstrein	Austria	1		1	-	-	-	-	-	-	-	-	-	-	-	-
	Naomine Iwaya	Japan	1		-	1	-	-	-	-	-	-	-	-	-	-	-
	Peter Jurko	Czechoslovakia	1		-	-	-	-	-	-	-	1	-	-	-	-	-

Alpine skiing World Cup
Men

Overall | Downhill | Super G | Giant | Slalom | Combined

1986
