= 1986 Alpine Skiing World Cup – Men's downhill =

1986 Men's Downhill World Cup
Previous: 1985	Next: 1987

Men's downhill World Cup 1985/1986

== Calendar ==
Round	Race No	Place	Country	Date	Winner	Second	Third
1	1	Las Leñas	Argentina	August 16, 1985	(Switzerland) Karl Alpiger	(United States) Doug Lewis	(Austria) Helmut Höflehner
2	2	Las Leñas	Argentina	August 18, 1985	(Switzerland) Karl Alpiger	(Switzerland) Peter Müller	(West Germany) Markus Wasmeier
3	4	Val d'Isère	France	December 7, 1985	(Italy) Michael Mair	(Luxembourg) Marc Girardelli	(Austria) Peter Wirnsberger
4	5	Val Gardena	Italy	December 14, 1985	(Austria) Peter Wirnsberger	(Switzerland) Peter Müller	(West Germany) Sepp Wildgruber
5	11	Schladming	Austria	December 31, 1985	(Austria) Peter Wirnsberger	(Switzerland) Peter Müller	(Austria) Erwin Resch
6	15	Kitzbühel	Austria	January 17, 1986	(Austria) Peter Wirnsberger	(Austria) Erwin Resch	(Switzerland) Pirmin Zurbriggen
7	16	Kitzbühel	Austria	January 18, 1986	(Austria) Peter Wirnsberger	(Austria) Erwin Resch	(Italy) Michael Mair
8	26	Morzine	France	February 7, 1986	(Austria) Anton Steiner	(Switzerland) Gustav Oehrli	(Austria) Peter Wirnsberger
9	28	Morzine	France	February 8, 1986	(Switzerland) Peter Müller	(Austria) Leonhard Stock	(Norway) Atle Skårdal
10	31	Åre	Sweden	February 21, 1986	(Switzerland) Peter Müller	(Italy) Michael Mair	(Luxembourg) Marc Girardelli
11	33	Åre	Sweden	February 22, 1986	(Switzerland) Franz Heinzer	(Luxembourg) Marc Girardelli	(Austria) Armin Assinger
12	40	Aspen	United States	March 8, 1986	(Switzerland) Peter Müller	(Austria) Peter Wirnsberger	(Austria) Leonhard Stock
13	42	Whistler Mountain	Canada	March 15, 1986	(Austria) Anton Steiner	(Italy) Michael Mair	(Austria) Leonhard Stock

== Final point standings ==
In men's downhill World Cup 1985/86 the best 5 results count. 15 racers had a point deduction, which are given in ().

Place	Name	Country	Total points	Deduction	1 (Argentina)	2 (Argentina)	4 (France)	5 (Italy)	11 (Austria)	15 (Austria)	16 (Austria)	26 (France)	28 (France)	31 (Sweden)	33 (Sweden)	40 (United States)	42 (Canada)
1	Peter Wirnsberger	Austria	120	(60)	(9)	(12)	(15)	25	25	25	25	(15)	-	(4)	-	20	(5)
2	Peter Müller	Switzerland	115	(58)	(12)	20	(12)	20	(20)	-	(4)	(10)	25	25	-	25	-
3	Michael Mair	Italy	92	(34)	-	-	25	(10)	12	(1)	15	(9)	(8)	20	(5)	(1)	20
4	Marc Girardelli	Luxembourg	76	(21)	(6)	(7)	20	-	11	-	-	-	-	15	20	10	(8)
5	Karl Alpiger	Switzerland	75	(6)	25	25	4	(1)	-	-	-	-	-	12	9	(2)	(3)
6	Leonhard Stock	Austria	74	(20)	-	-	(7)	12	-	-	-	(11)	20	(2)	12	15	15
7	Erwin Resch	Austria	72	(10)	-	-	(5)	7	15	20	20	(4)	10	-	-	(1)	-
8	Anton Steiner	Austria	71	(10)	(2)	-	9	-	6	-	(1)	25	-	6	(2)	(5)	25
9	Franz Heinzer	Switzerland	68	(19)	(4)	-	-	11	(8)	-	12	-	(2)	(5)	25	9	11
10	Gustav Oehrli	Switzerland	57	(6)	-	-	-	8	-	7	11	20	11	-	-	(6)	-
11	Pirmin Zurbriggen	Switzerland	55	(4)	7	-	-	-	-	15	10	(4)	-	-	11	12
12	Helmut Höflehner	Austria	50	(15)	15	9	6	-	9	(3)	(3)	(3)	(6)	11	-	-	-
13	Daniel Mahrer	Switzerland	42	(6)	-	11	-	-	10	-	5	(2)	-	-	4	12	(4)
14	Markus Wasmeier	West Germany	41	(1)	10	15	-	-	4	5	-	-	-	-	(1)	7	-
15	Doug Lewis	United States	40		20	1	-	-	-	11	-	-	-	-	-	8	-
16	Danilo Sbardellotto	Italy	39	(3)	-	-	-	-	7	9	6	9	(3)	-	8	-	-
17	Martin Bell	United Kingdom	37		-	-	-	6	-	2	-	-	10	8	11	-	-
18	Stefan Niederseer	Austria	34		-	6	11	-	-	-	-	-	-	3	8	-	6
19	Gerhard Pfaffenbichler	Austria	32		-	8	-	-	-	-	-	12	12	-	-	-	-
20	Bill Johnson	United States	31		-	-	-	-	-	-	8	6	1	7	-	-	9
21	Armin Assinger	Austria	27		-	-	-	2	1	-	-	-	-	9	15	-	-
22	Atle Skårdal	Norway	25		5	-	-	-	-	-	-	1	15	-	-	4	-
23	Bruno Kernen	Switzerland	23		8	5	1	-	-	-	9	-	-	-	-	-	-
24	Franck Piccard	France	21		11	-	2	-	-	-	-	-	-	1	-	-	7
25	Sepp Wildgruber	West Germany	20		-	-	3	15	2	-	-	-	-	-	-	-	-
	Igor Cigolla	Italy	20		-	-	-	-	-	4	-	6	-	10	-	-	-
27	Conradin Cathomen	Switzerland	17		-	-	10	-	-	-	7	-	-	-	-	-	-
	Felix Belczyk	Canada	17		-	-	-	-	-	12	-	-	5	-	-	-	-
29	Rudolf Huber	Austria	16		-	10	-	-	-	6	-	-	-	-	-	-	-
	Rob Boyd	Canada	16		-	-	-	6	-	-	-	-	-	-	10	-	-
31	Philippe Verneret	France	14		-	-	9	3	-	-	2	-	-	-	-	-	-
32	Silvano Meli	Switzerland	11		-	-	-	-	-	-	1	7	-	-	-	3	-
33	Harti Weirather	Austria	10		-	2	-	-	5	-	-	-	-	-	3	-	-
	Todd Brooker	Canada	10		3	4	-	-	3	-	-	-	-	-	-	-	-
	Luc Genolet	Switzerland	10		-	-	-	-	-	10	-	-	-	-	-	-	-
	Franck Pons	France	10		-	-	-	-	-	-	-	-	-	-	-	-	10
37	Niklas Henning	Sweden	9		-	-	-	9	-	-	-	-	-	-	-	-	-
38	Ivano Marzola	Italy	8		-	-	-	-	-	8	-	-	-	-	-	-	-
39	Mike Brown	United States	7		-	-	-	-	-	-	-	-	7	-	-	-	-
40	Andreas Wenzel	Liechtenstein	6		-	-	-	-	-	-	-	-	-	-	6	-	-
41	Mathias Haas	Austria	4		-	-	-	4	-	-	-	-	-	-	-	-	-
42	Giorgio Piantanida	Italy	3		-	3	-	-	-	-	-	-	-	-	-	-	-
43	Brian Stemmle	Canada	2		-	-	-	-	-	-	-	-	-	-	-	-	2
44	Werner Marti	Switzerland	1		1	-	-	-	-	-	-	-	-	-	-	-	-
	Donald Stevens	Canada	1		-	-	-	-	-	-	-	-	-	-	-	-	1

Alpine skiing World Cup
Men

Overall | Downhill | Super G | Giant | Slalom | Combined

1986
