= 1986 Alpine Skiing World Cup – Men's combined =

1986 Combined World Cup
Previous: 1985	Next: 1987

Men's combined World Cup 1985/1986

== Final point standings ==
In men's combined World Cup 1985/86 the best 3 results count. Deductions are given in ().

Place	Name	Country	Total points	Deduction	7 (Italy)	18 (Austria)	24 (Switzerland)	27 (Austria) (France)	30 (France)	32 (Switzerland) (Sweden)	35 (Sweden)
1	Pirmin Zurbriggen	Switzerland	65	(12)	15	25	-	-	(12)	-	25
2	Marc Girardelli	Luxembourg	60		25	-	10	25	-	-	-
	Markus Wasmeier	West Germany	60	(30)	-	15	(12)	(12)	25	(6)	20
4	Leonhard Stock	Austria	55	(33)	(12)	-	(9)	20	20	(12)	15
5	Andreas Wenzel	Liechtenstein	50		10	20	-	-	-	20	-
6	Peter Müller	Switzerland	49	(12)	(6)	9	25	(6)	15	-	-
7	Günther Mader	Austria	33		-	-	-	-	8	25	-
8	Franz Heinzer	Switzerland	32	(18)	11	(8)	11	(3)	10	(7)	-
	Anton Steiner	Austria	32	(11)	(5)	12	(3)	-	(3)	11	9
10	Gustav Oehrli	Switzerland	30		-	-	-	15	-	15	-
11	Peter Wirnsberger	Austria	28	(12)	(4)	11	7	10	(7)	(1)	-
	Niklas Henning	Sweden	28		20	-	-	-	-	-	8
13	Michael Mair	Italy	27		1	-	20	-	6	-	-
14	Franck Piccard	France	24		9	-	4	-	-	-	11
15	Daniel Mahrer	Switzerland	21	(4)	-	-	-	(4)	9	5	7
	Helmut Höflehner	Austria	21	(2)	-	-	(2)	5	11	-	5
17	Christian Gaidet	France	20		-	-	-	8	-	-	12
18	Stefan Niederseer	Austria	18		-	-	8	-	-	10	-
	Luc Genolet	Switzerland	18		-	10	-	-	-	8	-
20	Martin Hangl	Switzerland	17		7	-	-	-	-	-	10
21	Karl Alpiger	Switzerland	15		-	-	15	-	-	-	-
22	Gerhard Pfaffenbichler	Austria	14		-	-	5	9	-	-	-
23	Bruno Kernen	Switzerland	13	(1)	2	7	-	(1)	-	-	4
24	Peter Roth	West Germany	11		-	-	-	11	-	-	-
25	Tiger Shaw	United States	9		-	-	-	-	-	9	-
	Bill Johnson	United States	9		-	5	-	-	1	3	-
27	Richard Pramotton	Italy	8		8	-	-	-	-	-	-
	Steven Lee	Australia	8		-	6	-	2	-	-	-
	Ivano Marzola	Italy	8		-	-	-	-	5	-	3
30	Peter Jurko	Czechoslovakia	7		-	-	-	7	-	-	-
31	Sepp Wildgruber	West Germany	6		-	-	6	-	-	-	-
	Miroslav Kolář	Czechoslovakia	6		-	-	-	-	-	-	6
	Martin Bell	United Kingdom	6		-	-	-	-	4	-	2
34	Mike Brown	United States	4		-	4	-	-	-	-	-
	Rudolf Huber	Austria	4		-	-	-	-	-	4	-
36	Thomas Bürgler	Switzerland	3		3	-	-	-	-	-	-
	Doug Lewis	United States	3		-	3	-	-	-	-	-
	Nigel Smith	United Kingdom	3		-	2	-	-	-	-	1
39	Herbert Renoth	West Germany	2		-	-	-	-	2	-	-
	Mats Holmgren	Sweden	2		-	-	-	-	-	2	-
41	Philippe Verneret	France	1		-	-	1	-	-	-	-

== Men's combined team results ==
All points were shown. bold indicate highest score - italics indicate race wins

Place	Country	Total points	7 (Italy)	18 (Austria)	24 (Switzerland)	27 (Austria) (France)	30 (France)	32 (Switzerland) (Sweden)	35 (Sweden)	Racers	Wins
1	Switzerland	310	44	59	51	29	46	35	46	10	3
2	Austria	263	21	23	34	44	49	**63**	29	8	1
3	West Germany	109	-	15	18	23	27	6	20	4	1
4	Luxembourg	60	25	-	10	25	-	-	-	1	2
5	Liechtenstein	50	10	20	-	-	-	20	-	1	0
6	France	45	9	-	5	8	-	-	23	3	0
7	Italy	43	9	-	20	-	11	-	3	3	0
8	Sweden	30	20	-	-	-	-	2	8	2	0
9	United States	25	-	12	-	-	1	12	-	4	0
10	Czechoslovakia	13	-	-	-	7	-	-	6	2	0
11	United Kingdom	9	-	2	-	-	4	-	3	2	0
12	Australia	8	-	6	-	2	-	-	-	1	0

**Alpine skiing World Cup**
**Women**

Overall | Downhill | Super G | Giant slalom | Slalom | Combined

**1986**
