= 1986 Alpine Skiing World Cup – Women's downhill =

1986 Women's downhill World Cup
Previous: 1985	Next: 1987

Women's downhill World Cup 1985/1986

== Final point standings ==
In women's downhill World Cup 1985/86 the best 5 results count. Deductions are given in ().

Place	Name	Country	Total points	Deduction	3 (France)	5 (France)	10 (Austria)	11 (Austria)	14 (France)	21 (Switzerland)	22 (Switzerland)	27 (Japan)	29 (Canada)	33 (United States)
1	Maria Walliser	Switzerland	115	(62)	(15)	20	(12)	25	(8)	(12)	20	25	25	(15)
2	Katrin Gutensohn	Austria	110	(58)	(12)	(11)	25	15	25	(15)	25	(11)	20	(9)
3	Laurie Graham	Canada	105	(42)	20	25	15	-	(15)	25	(12)	(15)	-	20
4	Brigitte Oertli	Switzerland	82	(3)	-	(3)	-	10	20	20	12	20	-	-
5	Liisa Savijarvi	Canada	65	(7)	-	(6)	20	9	(1)	-	-	12	12	12
6	Michela Figini	Switzerland	53	(4)	10	12	(4)	-	-	11	10	10	-	-
7	Michaela Gerg	West Germany	48		25	15	-	-	-	-	8	-	-	-
8	Pam Fletcher	United States	46		-	-	-	-	3	-	-	9	9	25
9	Regine Mösenlechner	West Germany	44	(10)	(1)	(5)	9	12	6	10	(4)	-	-	7
10	Marina Kiehl	West Germany	43	(13)	8	8	(6)	(4)	10	(3)	9	-	8	-
11	Heidi Zeller	Switzerland	41	(2)	-	(2)	-	8	-	8	-	3	11	11
12	Heidi Wiesler	West Germany	38		-	-	8	-	-	-	7	7	10	6
13	Sieglinde Winkler	Austria	37		-	-	11	20	-	1	-	5	-	-
14	Zoe Haas	Switzerland	36		4	7	-	-	5	5	15	-	-	-
15	Sigrid Wolf	Austria	35	(1)	2	-	10	(1)	9	7	-	-	7	-
16	Sylvia Eder	Austria	34		-	-	-	11	12	6	4	-	1	-
17	Veronika Wallinger	Austria	26		5	-	7	5	7	-	-	2	-	-
18	Karen Percy	Canada	24		-	-	1	2	-	-	-	6	15	-
19	Olga Charvátová	Czechoslovakia	21		-	-	-	-	-	-	5	8	-	8
	Holly Flanders	United States	21		-	4	-	-	-	4	-	4	4	5
21	Debbie Armstrong	United States	20		11	9	-	-	-	-	-	-	-	-
22	Veronika Vitzthum	Austria	17		-	-	-	7	4	-	6	-	-	-
23	Ariane Ehrat	Switzerland	16		3	10	-	-	-	-	-	-	3	-
24	Michaela Marzola	Italy	14		-	-	-	-	11	2	-	-	-	1
25	Karla Delago	Italy	13		-	-	3	-	-	9	1	-	-	-
	Erika Hess	Switzerland	13		7	1	-	-	-	-	-	-	5	-
27	Adele Allender	United States	10		-	-	-	-	-	-	-	-	-	10
28	Carole Merle	France	9		9	-	-	-	-	-	-	-	-	-
29	Catherine Quittet	France	8		-	-	-	-	-	-	2	-	6	-
30	Claudine Emonet	France	6		6	-	-	-	-	-	-	-	-	-
	Élisabeth Chaud	France	6		-	-	-	6	-	-	-	-	-	-
	Karen Stemmle	Canada	6		-	-	-	3	-	-	-	1	2	-
33	Miriam Vogt	West Germany	5		-	-	5	-	-	-	-	-	-	-
34	Sandra Van Ert	United States	4		-	-	-	-	-	-	-	-	-	4
35	Hilary Lindh	United States	3		-	-	-	-	-	-	-	-	-	3
36	Anne Flore Rey	France	2		-	-	2	-	-	-	-	-	-	-
	Katrin Stotz	West Germany	2		-	-	-	-	2	-	-	-	-	-
	Lynda McGehee	United States	2		-	-	-	-	-	-	-	-	-	2

== Women's Downhill Team Results ==
All points were shown including individuel deduction. bold indicate highest score - italics indicate race wins

Place	Country	Total points	3 (France)	5 (France)	10 (Austria)	11 (Austria)	14 (France)	21 (Switzerland)	22 (Switzerland)	27 (Japan)	29 (Canada)	33 (United States)	Racers	Wins
1	Switzerland	427	39	55	16	43	33	56	57	58	44	26	7	3
2	Austria	318	19	11	53	**59**	57	29	35	18	28	9	6	3
3	Canada	249	20	31	36	14	16	25	12	34	29	32	4	2
4	West Germany	203	34	28	28	16	18	13	28	7	18	13	6	1
5	United States	106	11	13	-	-	3	4	-	13	13	49	7	1
6	France	31	15	-	2	6	-	-	2	-	6	-	5	0
7	Italy	27	-	-	3	-	11	11	1	-	-	1	2	0
8	Czechoslovakia	21	-	-	-	-	-	-	5	8	-	8	1	0

**Alpine skiing World Cup**
**Women**

Overall | Downhill | Super-G | Giant slalom | Slalom | Combined

**1986**
