= 1986 Alpine Skiing World Cup – Women's slalom =

1986 Women's slalom World Cup
| Previous: 1985 | Next: 1987 |

Women's slalom World Cup 1985/1986

== Final point standings ==
In women's slalom World Cup 1985/86 the best 5 results count. Deductions are given in ().

| Place | Name | Country | Total points | Deduction | 2 (Italy) | 6 (Switzerland) | 7 (Socialist Federal Republic of Yugoslavia) | 12 (Austria) | 19 (France) | 23 (Italy) | 26 (Czechoslovakia) | 32 (United States) | 35 (United States) |
|---|---|---|---|---|---|---|---|---|---|---|---|---|---|
| 1 | Erika Hess | Switzerland | 110 | (40) | 20 | 25 | 20 | 20 | - | (10) | (15) | 25 | (15) |
| | Roswitha Steiner | Austria | 110 | (18) | 25 | - | 25 | - | 25 | (8) | 10 | (10) | 25 |
| 3 | Perrine Pelen | France | 77 | (16) | (8) | 11 | - | - | 20 | 20 | (8) | 15 | 11 |
| 4 | Olga Charvátová | Czechoslovakia | 56 | | - | - | - | 11 | - | 25 | - | 20 | - |
| 5 | Ida Ladstätter | Austria | 52 | | - | - | 15 | 12 | 10 | 6 | - | - | 9 |
| 6 | Brigitte Oertli | Switzerland | 52 | (3) | 15 | - | - | 6 | - | 15 | (3) | 9 | 7 |
| 7 | Małgorzata Tlałka | Poland | 51 | | - | - | - | - | 11 | 9 | - | 11 | 20 |
| | Vreni Schneider | Switzerland | 51 | | 9 | 12 | 9 | 15 | - | - | - | - | 6 |
| 9 | Corinne Schmidhauser | Switzerland | 49 | | - | - | 4 | - | 8 | - | 25 | - | 12 |
| | Mateja Svet | Yugoslavia | 49 | | - | 7 | - | 5 | 15 | 12 | - | - | 10 |
| 11 | Brigitte Gadient | Switzerland | 44 | | - | 20 | 12 | - | - | - | 12 | - | - |
| | Anni Kronbichler | Austria | 44 | | - | - | - | 25 | - | 7 | 9 | - | 3 |
| 13 | Nadia Bonfini | Italy | 38 | | 3 | 15 | - | - | - | - | 20 | - | - |
| 14 | Tamara McKinney | United States | 35 | | 6 | 10 | - | 8 | - | - | 11 | - | - |
| 15 | Claudia Strobl | Austria | 32 | | - | - | 10 | - | - | 11 | 4 | 7 | - |
| 16 | Caroline Beer | Austria | 25 | (2) | 4 | 9 | - | 3 | 7 | 2 | (2) | - | - |
| | Monika Hess | Switzerland | 25 | | 7 | - | - | - | 12 | - | - | 6 | - |
| 18 | Heidi Gapp | Austria | 23 | | - | 3 | 3 | - | - | - | - | 12 | 5 |
| 19 | Maria Epple | West Germany | 20 | | - | - | 11 | - | 9 | - | - | - | - |
| | Maria Rosa Quario | Italy | 20 | | - | - | - | 10 | 5 | - | 5 | - | - |
| | Paoletta Magoni Sforza | Italy | 20 | | 10 | - | - | - | - | - | 6 | - | 4 |
| | Daniela Zini | Italy | 20 | | - | - | 8 | 4 | - | - | 7 | - | 1 |
| 23 | Eva Twardokens | United States | 19 | | 12 | - | - | - | 2 | - | - | 5 | - |
| 24 | Camilla Nilsson | Sweden | 18 | | 11 | - | 7 | - | - | - | - | - | - |
| | Karin Buder | Austria | 18 | | 5 | - | - | 9 | 4 | - | - | - | - |
| 26 | Hélène Barbier | France | 16 | | - | 8 | - | - | 6 | - | - | - | 2 |
| 27 | Katja Lesjak | Yugoslavia | 12 | | - | - | 5 | 7 | - | - | - | - | - |
| | Veronika Šarec | Yugoslavia | 12 | | - | - | 6 | 1 | - | 5 | - | - | - |
| 29 | Sylvia Eder | Austria | 9 | | - | 6 | - | - | - | - | - | 3 | - |
| 30 | Christa Kinshofer | Netherlands | 8 | | - | - | - | - | - | - | - | 8 | - |
| | Dorota Tlałka | Poland | 8 | | - | - | - | - | - | - | - | - | 8 |
| 32 | Lorena Frigo | Italy | 6 | | 1 | 5 | - | - | - | - | - | - | - |
| 33 | Christine von Grünigen | Switzerland | 4 | | - | 4 | - | - | - | - | - | - | - |
| | Mojca Dežman | Yugoslavia | 4 | | - | 2 | 2 | - | - | - | - | - | - |
| | Catharina Glassér-Bjerner | Sweden | 4 | | - | - | - | - | 4 | - | - | - | - |
| | Helga Lazak | West Germany | 4 | | - | - | - | - | - | 4 | - | - | - |
| | Ulrike Maier | Austria | 4 | | - | - | - | - | - | - | - | 4 | - |
| 38 | Regula Betschart | Switzerland | 3 | | - | - | - | - | - | 3 | - | - | - |
| | Monika Maierhofer | Austria | 3 | | 2 | - | - | - | - | - | 1 | - | - |
| 40 | Maria Walliser | Switzerland | 2 | | - | - | - | 2 | - | - | - | - | - |
| | Anita Wachter | Austria | 2 | | - | - | - | - | 1 | 1 | - | - | - |
| | Beth Madsen | United States | 2 | | - | - | - | - | - | - | - | 2 | - |
| | Anette Gersch | West Germany | 2 | | - | - | 1 | - | - | - | - | 1 | - |
| 39 | Paola Marciandi | Italy | 1 | | - | 1 | - | - | - | - | - | - | - |

== Women's slalom team results ==
All points were shown including individuel deduction. bold indicate highest score - italics indicate race wins

| Place | Country | Total points | 7 (Italy) | 9 (Austria) | 10 (Italy) | 13 (Austria) | 15 (Switzerland) | 22 (Switzerland) | 23 (Germany) | 31 (Japan) | 32 (Switzerland) | Racers | Wins |
|---|---|---|---|---|---|---|---|---|---|---|---|---|---|
| 1 | Switzerland | 383 | 51 | **61** | 45 | 43 | 20 | 28 | 55 | 40 | 40 | 9 | 3 |
| 2 | Austria | 342 | 36 | 18 | 53 | 49 | 47 | 35 | 26 | 36 | 42 | 11 | 5 |
| 3 | France | 109 | 8 | 19 | - | - | 26 | 20 | 8 | 15 | 13 | 2 | 0 |
| 4 | Italy | 105 | 14 | 21 | 8 | 14 | 5 | - | 38 | - | 5 | 6 | 0 |
| 5 | Yugoslavia | 77 | - | 9 | 13 | 13 | 15 | 17 | - | - | 10 | 4 | 0 |
| 6 | Poland | 59 | - | - | - | - | 11 | 9 | - | 11 | 28 | 2 | 0 |
| 7 | Czechoslovakia | 56 | - | - | - | 11 | - | 25 | - | 20 | - | 1 | 1 |
| | United States | 56 | 18 | 10 | - | 8 | 2 | - | 11 | 7 | - | 3 | 0 |
| 9 | West Germany | 26 | - | - | 12 | - | 9 | 4 | - | 1 | - | 3 | 0 |
| 10 | Sweden | 22 | 11 | - | 7 | - | 4 | - | - | - | - | 2 | 0 |
| 11 | Netherlands | 8 | - | - | - | - | - | - | - | 8 | - | 1 | 0 |

**Alpine skiing World Cup**
**Women**

Overall | Downhill | Super-G | Giant slalom | Slalom | Combined

**1986**
