= 1986 Alpine Skiing World Cup – Men's giant slalom =

1986 Men's giant slalom World Cup
Previous: 1985	Next: 1987

Men's giant slalom World Cup 1985/1986

== Calendar ==
Round	Race No	Place	Country	Date	Winner	Second	Third
1	6	Alta Badia	Italy	December 15, 1985	(Sweden) Ingemar Stenmark	(Austria) Hubert Strolz	(Italy) Robert Erlacher
2	9	Kranjska Gora	Yugoslavia	December 20, 1985	(Switzerland) Joël Gaspoz	(Italy) Robert Erlacher	(Austria) Hubert Strolz
3	12	Kranjska Gora	Yugoslavia	January 3, 1986	(Switzerland) Joël Gaspoz	(Austria) Hubert Strolz	(West Germany) Markus Wasmeier
4	21	Adelboden	Switzerland	January 28, 1986	(Italy) Richard Pramotton	(Italy) Marco Tonazzi	(Austria) Hubert Strolz
5	37	Hemsedal	Norway	February 27, 1986	(Sweden) Ingemar Stenmark	(West Germany) Hans Stuffer	(Austria) Hubert Strolz
6	44	Lake Placid	United States	March 18, 1986	(Sweden) Ingemar Stenmark	(Austria) Hubert Strolz	(Italy) Robert Erlacher
7	45	Lake Placid	United States	March 19, 1986	(Switzerland) Joël Gaspoz	(Italy) Robert Erlacher	(Austria) Hubert Strolz

== Final point standings ==
In men's giant slalom World Cup 1985/86 the best 5 results count. Deduction are given in ().

Place	Name	Country	Total points	Deduction	6 (Italy)	9 (Socialist Federal Republic of Yugoslavia)	12 (Socialist Federal Republic of Yugoslavia)	21 (Switzerland)	37 (Norway)	44 (United States)	45 (United States)
1	Joël Gaspoz	Switzerland	97	(12)	11	25	25	(1)	11	(11)	25
2	Ingemar Stenmark	Sweden	96	(8)	25	9	(8)	-	25	25	12
3	Hubert Strolz	Austria	90	(30)	20	15	20	15	(15)	20	(15)
4	Robert Erlacher	Italy	77		15	20	7	-	-	15	20
5	Marc Girardelli	Luxembourg	57		10	12	12	11	12	-	-
6	Richard Pramotton	Italy	52		9	-	9	25	8	1	-
7	Rok Petrović	Yugoslavia	45		12	-	6	12	10	-	5
8	Markus Wasmeier	West Germany	34		-	-	15	7	-	2	10
9	Marco Tonazzi	Italy	33		8	5	-	20	-	-	-
10	Pirmin Zurbriggen	Switzerland	30		-	-	5	4	-	10	11
11	Christian Gaidet	France	27		5	10	-	-	-	12	-
12	Martin Hangl	Switzerland	26		-	-	11	10	5	-	-
13	Günther Mader	Austria	24		-	-	-	6	-	9	9
14	Michael Eder	West Germany	22		-	-	-	-	9	7	6
15	Hans Stuffer	West Germany	20		-	-	-	-	20	-	-
	Oswald Tötsch	Italy	20		-	11	1	-	-	8	-
17	Hans Enn	Austria	18		-	7	4	3	-	4	-
18	Max Julen	Switzerland	16		-	6	2	-	-	-	8
19	Bojan Križaj	Yugoslavia	15		7	8	-	-	-	-	-
20	Jörgen Sundqvist	Sweden	13		6	-	-	-	7	-	-
21	Alex Giorgi	Italy	13		3	-	3	-	-	5	2
22	Andreas Wenzel	Liechtenstein	12		-	-	10	2	-	-	-
23	Tomaž Čižman	Yugoslavia	11		-	-	-	8	3	-	-
24	Alberto Tomba	Italy	11		-	-	-	-	4	-	7
25	Leonhard Stock	Austria	10		-	-	-	-	6	-	4
26	Peter Namberger	West Germany	9		-	-	-	9	-	-	-
27	Franck Piccard	France	7		4	-	-	-	-	3	-
28	Dietmar Köhlbicher	Austria	6		-	-	-	-	-	6	-
29	Johan Wallner	Sweden	5		-	-	-	5	-	-	-
30	Roland Pfeifer	Austria	4		-	4	-	-	-	-	-
	Tiger Shaw	United States	4		1	-	-	-	2	-	1
32	Franz Gruber	Austria	3		3	-	-	-	-	-	-
	Ivano Camozzi	Italy	3		-	3	-	-	-	-	-
	Gerhard Lieb	Austria	3		-	-	-	-	-	-	3
35	Peter Roth	West Germany	2		-	2	-	-	-	-	-
36	Hans Pieren	Switzerland	1		-	1	-	-	-	-	-
	Thomas Bürgler	Switzerland	1		-	-	-	-	1	-	-

Alpine Skiing World Cup
Men

Overall | Downhill | Super G | Giant | Slalom | Combined

1986
