= Austrian Alpine Ski Championships 1984 =

The 1984 Austrian Alpine Ski Championships (Österreichischen Alpinen Skimeisterschaften 1984) took place from 22 to 25 February in the District of Kitzbühel. The downhill events were held in Oberndorf, the giant slalom runs in Kirchberg and the slalom competition in Jochberg.

== Men ==
=== Downhill ===
Place	Name	Time
1	Helmut Höflehner	1:54.76 min
2	Erwin Resch	1:55.91 min
3	Harti Weirather	1:56.03 min
4	Peter Wirnsberger	1:56.59 min
5	Gerhard Pfaffenbichler	1:56.69 min
6	Christian Sölle	1:57.17 min
7	Franz Klammer	1:57.60 min
8	Rudolf Stocker	1:57.62 min
9	Guido Hinterseer	1:58.16 min
10	Manfred Walch	1:58.43 min

Date: 22 February 1984
Place: Oberndorf
Piste: Penzing

=== Giant slalom ===
Place	Name	Time
1	Franz Gruber	3:01.41 min
2	Hans Enn	3:01.45 min
3	Konrad Walk	3:01.69 min
4	Ernst Riedlsperger	3:02.36 min
5	Thomas Stangassinger	3:02.52 min
6	Joachim Buchner	3:02.87 min
7	Leonhard Stock	3:03.65 min
8	Günther Mader	3:04.02 min
9	Wopfner	3:04.27 min
10	Hubert Strolz	3:04.56 min

Date: 24 February 1984
Place: Kirchberg

=== Slalom ===
Place	Name	Time
1	Bernhard Gstrein	1:46.58 min
2	Dietmar Köhlbichler	1:47.00 min
3	Robert Zoller	1:47.72 min
4	Christian Orlainsky	1:48.47 min
5	Hannes Spiss	1:48.75 min
6	Mathias Berthold	1:48.84 min
7	Hans Enn	1:49.21 min
8	Ernst Riedlsperger	1:50.33 min
9	Günther Mader	1:50.49 min
10	Guido Hinterseer	1:50.54 min

Date: 25 February 1984
Place: Jochberg

=== Combination ===
The combination combines the results of the slalom, giant slalom and downhill events.

Place	Name
1	Bernhard Gstrein
2	Ernst Riedlsperger
3	Joachim Buchner

== Women ==
=== Downhill ===
Place	Name	Time
1	Lea Sölkner	1:14.37 min
2	Elisabeth Kirchler	1:14.57 min
3	Sieglinde Winkler	1:14.92 min
4	Sylvia Eder	1:14.96 min
5	Christine Zanger	1:15.11 min
6	Gudrun Arnitz	1:15.18 min
7	Veronika Wallinger	1:15.24 min
8	Claudia Wernig	1:15.42 min
9	Sigrid Wolf	1:15.57 min
10	Astrid Geisler	1:16.58 min

Date: 22 February 1984
Place: Oberndorf
Piste: Penzing

=== Giant slalom ===
Place	Name	Time
1	Claudia Riedl	2:36.59 min
2	Anni Kronbichler	2:36.93 min
3	Sieglinde Winkler	2:37.12 min
4	Anita Braunegger	2:37.54 min
5	Manuela Rüf	2:37.93 min
6	Roswitha Steiner	2:38.73 min
7	Karin Buder	2:39.11 min
8	Sylvia Eder	2:39.25 min
9	E. Vitzthum	2:39.31 min
10	Claudia Wernig	2:39.44 min

Date: 23 February 1984
Place: Kirchberg

=== Slalom ===
Place	Name	Time
1	Roswitha Steiner	1:34.43 min
2	Ida Ladstätter	1:35.21 min
3	Karin Buder	1:35.42 min
4	Lea Sölkner	1:35.69 min
5	Rosi Aschenwald	1:36.31 min
6	Manuela Rüf	1:36.73 min
7	Michaela Glück	1:37.68 min
8	Susanne Buchbauer	1:38.45 min
9	Sieglinde Winkler	1:38.67 min
10	Rosemarie Dreier	1:39.10 min

Date: 24 February 1984
Place: Jochberg

=== Combination ===
The combination combines the results of the slalom, giant slalom and downhill events.

Place	Name
1	Sieglinde Winkler
2	Sylvia Eder
3	Anita Braunegger
