= Ingrid Grant =

British alpine skier (born 1964)

Ingrid Grant (born 16 October 1964 in Haddington, East Lothian) is a British former alpine skier who competed in the 1988 Winter Olympics.
