= Ivano Edalini =

Italian alpine skier

Personal information
- Born: August 20, 1961 (age 65) Zug, Switzerland

Skiing career
- Sport: Alpine skiing
- Disciplines: Slalom, giant slalom, combined, Parallel
- World Cup debut: February 9, 1982

World Championships
- Teams: 2 – (1985-1987)

World Cup
- Seasons: 1982-1988
- Wins: 1 – (1 SL)
- Podiums: 3 – (3 SL)
Medal record
Men's alpine skiing
Representing Italy
World Cup race podiums
Event	1st	2nd	3rd
Slalom	1	0	2
Parallel	1	0	0
Total	2	0	2

Ivano Edalini (born 20 August 1961) is an Italian former alpine skier.

== Career ==
Born in Zug, Switzerland he competed under Italian flag. He made his World Cup debut in February 1982. He won two World Cup races, one parallel and one slalom and has been on 4 World Cup podiums in total. On January 6, 1986, he won his first World Cup parallel slalom race in Vienna, Austria and slalom in Madonna di Campiglio in December 1986.

== World Cup ==
=== Race podiums ===
- 1 win – (1 SL)
- 3 podiums – (3 SL)

Season	Date	Location	Discipline	Position
1985	10 December 1984	Sestriere, Italy	Slalom	3rd
1986	1 December 1985	Sestriere, Italy	Slalom	3rd
1987	16 December 1986	Madonna di Campiglio, Italy	Slalom	1st

- Note: On 6 January 1986 he won parallel slalom in Vienna, which counted for Nations Cup only.
