= Pam Fletcher =

American alpine skier (born 1963)

Personal information
- Born: January 30, 1963 (age 63) Acton, Massachusetts, U.S.
- Height: 5 ft 6 in (1.68 m)

Skiing career
- Sport: Alpine skiing
- Retired: March 1989 (age 26)
- Disciplines: Downhill, Super-G, Combined
- World Cup debut: March 5, 1983 (age 20)

Olympics
- Teams: 1 - (1988) - injured
- Medals: 0

World Championships
- Teams: 2 - (1987–89)
- Medals: 0

World Cup
- Seasons: 7 - (1983–89)
- Wins: 1 - (1 DH)
- Podiums: 3 - (2 DH, 1 SG)
- Overall titles: 0 - (23rd in 1986)
- Discipline titles: 0 - (8th in DH, 1986)

Pam Ann Fletcher (born January 30, 1963) is a former World Cup alpine ski racer from the United States.

Her career was marked by injuries, and the most publicized occurred at the 1988 Winter Olympics in Canada. Just an hour prior to the scheduled start of the women's downhill, Fletcher collided with a course volunteer at the bottom of a warm-up slope at Nakiska and broke her right fibula.

She retired from international competition following the 1989 season with one World Cup victory and two additional podiums.

== World Cup results ==
=== Race podiums ===
- 1 win - (1 DH)
- 3 podiums - (2 DH, 1 SG)

Season	Date	Location	Discipline	Place
1986	2 Mar 1986	Furano, Japan	Super-G	3rd
1986	15 Mar 1986	(United States) Vail, USA	Downhill	1st
1987	13 Mar 1987	(United States) Vail, USA	Downhill	3rd

=== Season standings ===
Season	Age	Overall	Slalom	Giant Slalom	Super-G	Downhill	Combined
1983	20	58	—	—	not awarded	30	—
1984	21	82	—	—	not awarded	—	33
1985	22				not awarded		
1986	23	23	—	—	18	8	32
1987	24	43	—	—	—	18	—
1988	25	44	—	—	—	21	15
1989	26	72	—	—	—	32	—

== World Championship results ==
Year	Age	Slalom	Giant slalom	Super-G	Downhill	Combined
1987	24	—	—	23	19	—
1989	26	—	—	—	24	—

== Olympic results ==
Year	Age	Slalom	Giant slalom	Super-G	Downhill	Combined
1988	25	—	—	—	DNS	—
