= Ski Bromont =

Ski resort in Quebec, Canada

Bromont, montagne d'expériences
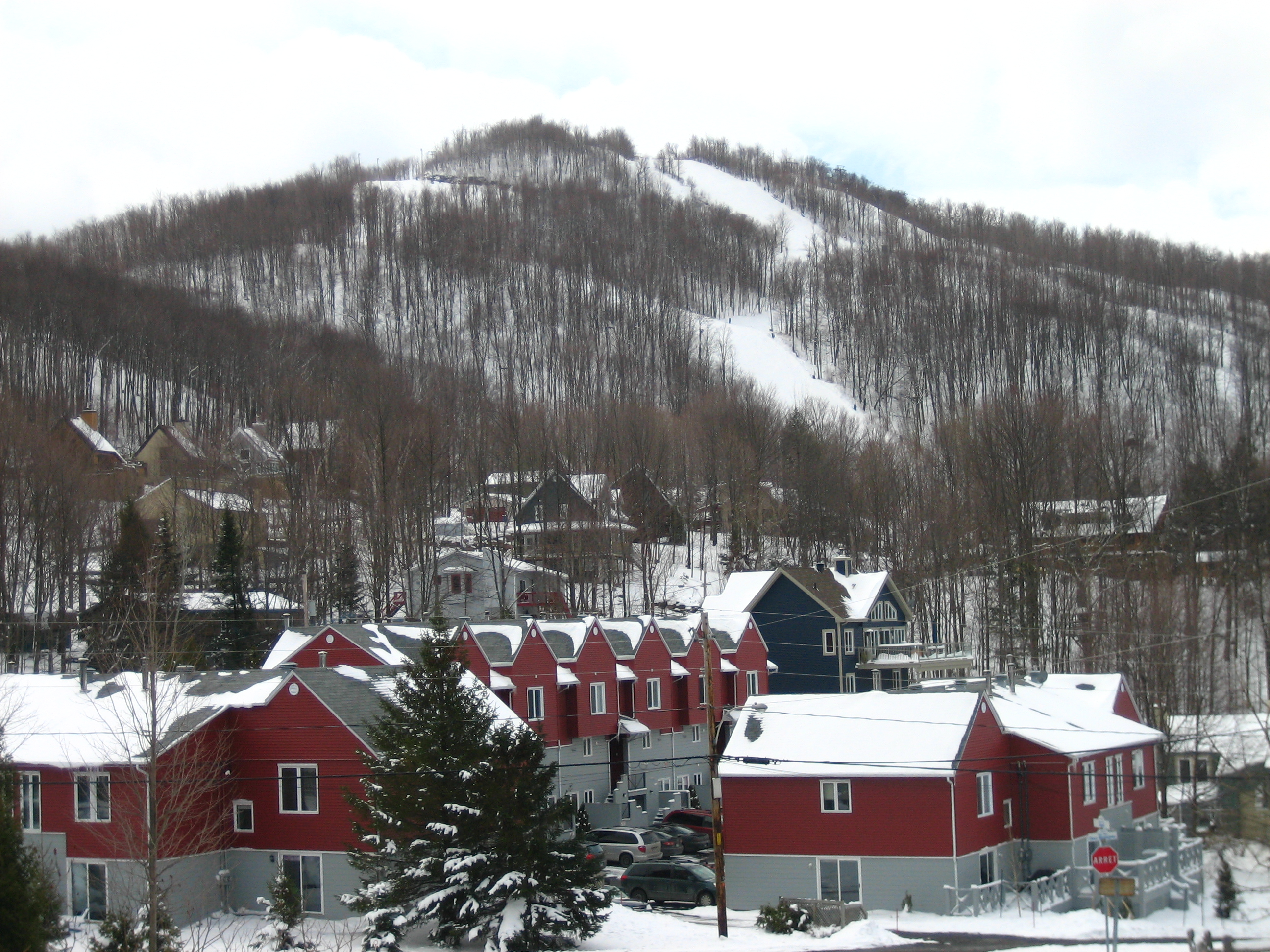
- Mont Brome behind houses of the municipality of Bromont
- Interactive map of Bromont, montagne d'expériences
- Location: Bromont, Quebec
- Coordinates: 45°18′04″N 72°38′14″W
- Vertical: 385 m (1,263 ft)
- Top elevation: 565 m (1,854 ft)
- Base elevation: 180 m (590 ft)
- Skiable area: 450 acres (180 ha)
- Trails: 142 trails and 42 Glades; 30% Easy; 34% Intermediate; 15% Difficult; 21% Very difficult
- Lift system: 8 chairlifts, 3 magic carpet
- Website: Bromont, montagne d'expériences

Bromont, montagne d'expériences is an alpine ski resort located in Bromont, Quebec on the slopes of Mont Brome, Mont Spruce, and Pic du Chevreuil. As of the 2009-2010 season, it was the largest centre in North America for illuminated alpine skiing. It is one of the four major ski centres in the Eastern Townships east of Montreal, the other three being Ski Mont Sutton, Ski Mont Orford, and Owl's Head. It is about 45 minutes from Montreal.

Mount Brome is 2000 feet high, and the resort has a vertical drop of 1300 feet. The resort has 9 chair lifts.

The ski resort opened in 1964, for the 1964-1965 ski season, with the opening of the new Eastern Townships Autoroute, Quebec Autoroute 10. It was created in the same year that the City of Bromont was created, out of Brome County. A second chalet was established at the top of the mountain in 1978. The City of Montreal has invested in the resort. The Canadian government has also invested in the resort. Its investment, for a World Cup event, created permanent facilities for the Bromont Ski School. Bromont became the largest night skiing venue in eastern North America in 2006 when it upped its lighted ski runs to 50.

At one time, the resort was part of the Ski East promotional group, along with the resorts of Jay Peak Resort (Vermont), Ski Mont Orford, Ski Mont Sutton, Owl's Head, Ski Mt. Echo.

At one time, the resort has staged events for the alpine Eastern Canada Cup. The resort has hosted the Bromont Cup, an alpine event that has been part of the Pontiac Cup, a national ski championship in Canada, that was based on the international championship, in the 1960s. It has also hosted an alpine World Cup event. Also hosted has been a freestyle World Cup event.

Amongst other things outside of ski season available at the resort, is an aquatic park, with water slides.

In 2018, Bromont replaced a 1985-built high speed quadruple Poma chairlift by Canada's second hybrid lift composed of six place chairs and eight passenger cabins, at a cost of roughly 10.1 M$, part of Bromont's 111 M$ Projet Altitude plan.

== Mountain's Profile ==
	Base	Summit	Vertical Drop	Trails	Night Skiing	Glades
Mont Soleil	180m	305m	125m	7	8	3
Versant du Village	218m	565m	385m(347m)	38	33	7
Versant du Lac	255m	565m	310m	17	21	9
Versant des Épinettes	255m	495m	240m	16	6	6
Versant du Midi	300m	495m	195m	7		1
Versant de la Côte Ouest	300m	500m	200m	14		8
Versant des Cantons	202m	483m	281m	14	17	8
