= Katarina Zajc =

Professor of law and former Olympic alpine skier

Katarina (Katra) Zajc (born January 31, 1967) is a law professor at the University of Ljubljana, and a former alpine skier from Slovenia.

Zajc graduated from University of Ljubljana, where she earned her bachelor's degree in law. She continued her studies in the USA, where she received an LLM degree from Yale Law School and a PhD in economics from George Mason University. At George Mason University, she received a Snavely Award for being the best PhD student in economics.

Zajc is currently a full professor of the Faculty of Law at the University of Ljubljana, where she is the President of the Chair of Law and Economics. In 2009, she started a six-year member term on the Judicial Council of Slovenia. In 2009-10, Zajc was a visiting professor at Utrecht University, Netherlands. Earlier in her career, she was also an arbiter at the Permanent Arbitrage at the Slovenian Chamber of Commerce, a lecturer at the Police Academy in Slovenia, a research and teaching assistant at George Mason University, USA, and a researcher at the Vienna Institute for Comparative Economic Studies, Austria.

In 1988, she represented Yugoslavia as an alpine skier in the Winter Olympics in Calgary, Canada.

== World Cup results ==
=== Season standings ===
Season	Age	Overall	Slalom	Giant slalom	Super-G	Downhill	Combined
1986	18	46	—	15	—	—	—

=== Race podiums ===
Season	Date	Location	Discipline	Position
1986	9 March 1986	Sunshine, Canada	Giant slalom	3rd
