= Rudolf Huber (alpine skier) =

Austrian alpine skier

Personal information
- Born: 20 February 1963 (age 63) Wagrain, Austria

Skiing career
- Sport: Alpine skiing
- Club: SC Wagrain
- Retired: 1988
- Disciplines: Speed events
- World Cup debut: 1984

World Cup
- Seasons: 5
Medal record
Men's alpine skiing
Representing Austria
International competitions
| Event | 1st | 2nd | 3rd |
|---|---|---|---|
| European Junior Championships | 0 | 1 | 0 |

Rudolf Huber (born 20 February 1963) is a former Austrian alpine skier.

== Career ==
During his career, he achieved 6 results among the top 10 in the World Cup.

== World Cup results ==
Top 10

| Date | Place | Discipline | Rank |
|---|---|---|---|
| 01-03-1987 | (Japan) Furano | Super G | 10 |
| 28-02-1987 | (Japan) Furano | Downhill | 6 |
| 17-01-1986 | (Austria) Kitzbuehel | Downhill | 10 |
| 18-08-1985 | (Argentina) Las Lenas | Downhill | 6 |
| 09-03-1985 | (United States) Aspen | Downhill | 7 |
| 15-12-1984 | (Italy) Val Gardena | Downhill | 8 |
