= Luc Genolet =

Swiss alpine skier

Personal information
- Born: 18 September 1963 (age 62) Hérémence, Switzerland

Skiing career
- Sport: Alpine skiing
- Retired: 1988
- Disciplines: Speed events, giant slalom
- World Cup debut: 1986

World Cup
- Seasons: 3
Medal record
Men's alpine skiing
Representing Switzerland
International competitions
Event	1st	2nd	3rd
European Junior Championships	0	0	1

Luc Genolet (born 18 September 1963) is a former Swiss alpine skier who won the Europa Cup overall title in 1985.

== Career ==
During his career he has achieved 4 results among the top 10 in the World Cup.

== World Cup results ==
Top 10

Date	Place	Discipline	Rank
23-01-1988	(Switzerland) Leukerbad	Downhill	7
21-02-1986	(Switzerland) Wengen	Combined	8
19-01-1986	(Austria) Kitzbuehel	Combined	6
17-01-1986	(Austria) Kitzbuehel	Downhill	6

== Europa Cup results ==
Genolet has won an overall Europa Cup and one discipline cup.

- FIS Alpine Ski Europa Cup
  - Overall: 1985
  - Downhill: 1984
