= Philippe Verneret =

French alpine skier (born 1962)

Philippe Verneret (born 3 July 1962 in Cluses) is a French former alpine skier who competed in the 1984 Winter Olympics and 1988 Winter Olympics.
