= Peter Wirnsberger =

Austrian alpine skier (born 1958)

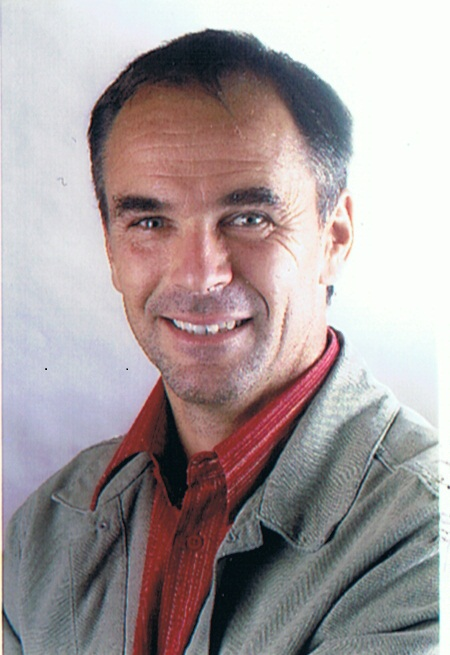

Personal information
- Born: 13 September 1958 (age 67) Vordernberg, Steiermark, Austria

Skiing career
- Sport: Alpine skiing

Olympics
- Medals: 1 (0 gold)

World Championships
- Teams: 1
- Medals: 0

World Cup
- Wins: 8
- Discipline titles: 1 (DH 1986)
Medal record
Olympic Games
Silver medal – second place	1980 Lake Placid	Downhill

Peter Wirnsberger (born 13 September 1958) is an Austrian former alpine skier who won 8 races in World Cup.

== Achievements ==
Year	Competition	Venue	Rank	event
1978	World Championship	(Germany) Garmisch-Partenkirchen	19th	Downhill
1980	Olympic Games	(United States) Lake Placid	2nd	Downhill
1982	World Championship	(Austria) Schladming	12th	Downhill
1984	Austrian Alpine Ski Championships	(Austria) Oberndorf	4th	Downhill
1985	World Championship	(Italy) Bormio	6th	Downhill
1989	World Championship	(United States) Vail	8th	Downhill
1991	World Championship	(Austria) Saalbach-Hinterglemm	10th	Downhill

== See also ==
- Men's Downhill Small Crystal Globe podiums
