= Maria Walliser =

Swiss alpine skier

Personal information
- Born: 27 May 1963 (age 63) Mosnang, Switzerland
- Height: 1.68 m (5 ft 6 in)

Skiing career
- Sport: Alpine skiing
- Club: SC Libingen
- Retired: 1990
- Disciplines: Speed events, giant slalom
- World Cup debut: 1983

Olympics
- Teams: 2
- Medals: 3

World Championships
- Teams: 4
- Medals: 4 (3 gold)

World Cup
- Seasons: 8
- Wins: 25
- Podiums: 72
- Overall titles: 2
- Discipline titles: 5
Medal record
Women's alpine skiing
Representing Switzerland
World Cup race podiums
Event	1st	2nd	3rd
Slalom	0	0	1
Giant slalom	6	5	6
Downhill	14	10	13
Super-G	3	3	3
Combined	2	3	3
Total	25	21	26
Olympic Games
Silver medal – second place	1984 Sarajevo	Downhill
Bronze medal – third place	1988 Calgary	Alpine Combined
Bronze medal – third place	1988 Calgary	Giant slalom
World Championships
Gold medal – first place	1987 Crans-Montana	Downhill
Gold medal – first place	1987 Crans-Montana	Super-G
Gold medal – first place	1989 Vail	Downhill
Bronze medal – third place	1987 Crans-Montana	Giant slalom

Maria Walliser (born 27 May 1963) is a Swiss former alpine skier.

== Career ==
Walliser grew up in Mosnang, the daughter of a wealthy cattle breeder. She made her World Cup debut in 1980. Together with her fellow Swiss Erika Hess, Michela Figini and Vreni Schneider she dominated female alpine skiing during the 1980s. Among her many successes, she won two overall World Cups (1986 and 1987). Walliser also won three world titles in 1987 and 1989, as well as three Olympic medals at 1988 Calgary and 1984 Sarajevo.

Walliser retired in 1990 with a World Cup tally of 72 podium finishes, including 25 victories. In 2000, she became president of "Die Stiftung Folsäure Offensive Schweiz", a Swiss health organization fighting folate deficiency.

== World Cup results ==
=== Season titles ===
- 7 titles – (2 Overall, 2 DH, 1 GS, 1 AC, 1 SG)

Season	
Season	Discipline
1984	Downhill
1986	Overall
1986	Downhill
1986	Combined
1987	Overall
1987	Super-G
1987	Giant slalom

=== Season standings ===
Season	Overall		Downhill		Super G		Giant slalom		Slalom		Combined	
Season	Rank	Points	Rank	Points	Rank	Points	Rank	Points	Rank	Points	Rank	Points
1981	12.	112	11.	41	–	–	18.	14	19.	22	8.	35
1982	17.	75	8.	59	–	–	25.	12	32.	4	–	–
1983	5.	135	2.	97	–	–	10.	40	–	–	18.	11
1984	8.	131	1.	95	–	–	18.	24	–	–	8.	43
1985	3.	197	2.	81	–	–	4.	87	41.	2	3.	50
1986	1.	287	1.	115	10.	24	4.	76	40.	2	1.	70
1987	1.	269	2.	90	1.	82	1.	120	–	–	4.	12
1988	7.	143	3.	82	24.	5	8.	40	–	–	6.	16
1989	2.	261	2.	142	6.	27	3.	87	–	–	18.	5
1990	4.	227	5.	99	5.	56	6.	55	–	–	7.	17

=== Race victories ===
25 race victories (14 downhill, 3 super G, 6 giant slalom, 2 combined)

Date	Location	Discipline
21 January 1983	(France) Megève	Downhill
5 February 1983	(Socialist Federal Republic of Yugoslavia) Sarajevo	Downhill
8 December 1983	(France) Val-d'Isère	Downhill
21 January 1984	(Switzerland) Verbier	Downhill
8 March 1985	(Canada) Sunshine Village	Downhill
11 January 1986	(Austria) Bad Gastein	Downhill
12 January 1986	(Austria) Bad Gastein	Combined
5 February 1986	(Italy) Val Zoldana	Giant slalom
1 March 1986	(Japan) Furano	Downhill
8 March 1986	(Canada) Sunshine Village	Downhill
9 March 1986	(Canada) Sunshine Village	Combined
14 December 1986	(France) Val d'Isère	Super-G
20 December 1986	(Italy) Val Zoldana	Giant slalom
6 January 1987	(Austria) Saalbach-Hinterglemm	Super-G
18 January 1987	(Germany) Bischofswiesen	Giant slalom
27 February 1987	(Germany) Zwiesel	Giant slalom
15 March 1987	(United States) Vail	Super-G
22 March 1987	(Socialist Federal Republic of Yugoslavia) Sarajevo	Giant slalom
4 December 1987	(France) Val-d'Isère	Downhill
16 January 1988	(Switzerland) Zinal	Downhill
15 December 1988	(Austria) Altenmarkt	Downhill
19 January 1989	(France) Tignes	Downhill
4 March 1989	(Japan) Furano	Giant slalom
9 December 1989	(United States) Steamboat Springs	Downhill
13 January 1990	(Austria) Haus	Downhill

== World Championships results ==
Edition	Downhill	Super-G	Giant slalom	Combined
(Austria) 1982 Schladming	12	-	-	11
(Italy) 1985 Bormio	6	-	8	-
(Switzerland) 1987 Crans-Montana	1	1	3	-
(United States) 1989 Vail	1	4	4	-

== Olympic results ==
Edition	Downhill	Super-G	Giant slalom	Combined
(Socialist Federal Republic of Yugoslavia) 1984 Sarajevo	2	-	-	-
(Canada) 1988 Calgary	4	6	3	3

== See also ==
- List of FIS Alpine Ski World Cup women's race winners

Awards
Preceded by Michela Figini	Swiss Sportswoman of the Year; 1986–1987	Succeeded by Vreni Schneider
