= Rok Petrovič =

Slovenian alpine skier

Personal information
- Born: 5 February 1966 Ljubljana, SR Slovenia, SFR Yugoslavia
- Died: 16 September 1993 (aged 27) Vela Luka, Croatia

Skiing career
- Sport: Alpine skiing
- Retired: 10 March 1989
- Disciplines: Giant slalom, slalom
- World Cup debut: 10 December 1984

Olympics
- Medals: 0 (0 gold)

World Championships
- Medals: 0 (0 gold)

World Cup
- Seasons: 5
- Wins: 5
- Podiums: 9
- Overall titles: 0
- Discipline titles: 1

Rok Petrovič (5 February 1966 – 16 September 1993) was a Yugoslav and Slovenian alpine skier.

Petrovič was born in Ljubljana, Yugoslavia, the son of Zdenka Steiner and Krešimir Petrović, a well known sports psychologist of Croatian origin. His first success in alpine ski racing was the 1983 Junior World Championship slalom title in Sestriere, Italy.

After this, he rose in the world slalom rankings. During the 1985–86 Alpine Skiing World Cup season, he won five slalom races, finished second in St. Anton, Austria and third in Geilo, Norway. He won the World Cup slalom title and became the first Yugoslav skier to receive a crystal globe.

After his championship-winning season, Petrovič was unable to recapture his winning form, the only hint of his championship season being a second place behind his teammate Bojan Križaj at the unforgettable race in Kranjska Gora next season. He finished eighth in the 1988 Winter Olympic Games giant slalom.

Due to his lack of winning results, he quit skiing in 1988 and began studies at the College of Sports in Ljubljana. He graduated in 1991 and continued with post-graduate study. He was to defend his M.Sc. thesis in the autumn of 1993, but shortly before defending his thesis he took a short break at the Croatian island Korčula and drowned in a diving accident.

Altogether he won 5 World Cup races, all in slalom and all in his champion season in 1985-86:

== World Cup results ==
=== Season titles ===
Season	Discipline
1986	Slalom

=== Season standings ===
Season	Age	Overall	Slalom	Giant slalom	Super-G	Downhill	Combined
1985	18	30	16	16	—	—	—
1986	19	7	1	7	—	—	—
1987	20	33	11	27	—	—	—
1988	21	69	26	—	—	—	—
1989	22	68	34	31	—	—	—

=== Race podiums ===
Season	Date	Location	Discipline	Position
1985	20 March 1985	Park City, United States	Slalom	2nd
1986	1 December 1985	Sestriere, Italy	Slalom	1st
1986	21 December 1985	(Socialist Federal Republic of Yugoslavia) Kranjska Gora, Yugoslavia	Slalom	1st
1986	25 January 1986	St. Anton, Austria	Slalom	2nd
1986	2 February 1986	Wengen, Switzerland	Slalom	1st
1986	25 February 1986	Lillehammer, Norway	Slalom	1st
1986	2 March 1986	Geilo, Norway	Slalom	3rd
1986	11 March 1986	Heavenly Valley, United States	Slalom	1st
1987	20 December 1986	(Socialist Federal Republic of Yugoslavia) Kranjska Gora, Yugoslavia	Slalom	2nd

Awards
Preceded by Dražen Petrović	Yugoslav Sportsman of the Year; 1986	Succeeded by Bojan Križaj
