= Michaela Marzola =

Italian alpine skier

Personal information
- Born: 21 February 1966 (age 60) Sëlva, Italy

Skiing career
- Sport: Alpine skiing
- Retired: 1988
- Disciplines: Speed events
- World Cup debut: 1985

Olympics
- Teams: 1

World Cup
- Seasons: 4
- Wins: 1
- Podiums: 1

Michaela Marzola (born 21 February 1966) is an Italian former alpine skier who competed in the 1988 Winter Olympics.

== Biography ==
She is the sister of the other Italian skier Ivano Marzola.

== World Cup results ==
Top 10

Date	Place	Discipline	Position
05/03/1988	(United States) Aspen, CO	Downhill	10
17/01/1987	(Germany) Pfronten	Super G	5
06/01/1987	(Austria) Saalbach-Hinterglemm	Super G	7
02/03/1986	(Japan) Furano	Super G	10
25/01/1986	(France) Megeve	Super G	1
17/01/1986	(France) Puy St. Vincent	Super G	10
16/01/1986	(France) Puy St. Vincent	Downhill	5
07/12/1985	(Italy) Sestriere	Super G	6
