= Brigitte Gadient =

Swiss alpine skier

Personal information
- Born: 9 October 1963 (age 62) Flums-Grossberg, Switzerland

Skiing career
- Sport: Alpine skiing
- Retired: 1990
- Disciplines: Technical events
- World Cup debut: 1981

World Cup
- Seasons: 10
- Podiums: 4
Medal record
Women's alpine skiing
Representing Switzerland
World Cup race podiums
Event	1st	2nd	3rd
Slalom	0	3	1

Brigitte Gadient (born 9 October 1963) is a former Swiss ski racer. Her career was as a slalom specialist. She did not win a World Cup race, but finished in second place three times.

== Career ==
During the 1980s, she was teamed with a slalom team of Swiss competitors which included Erika Hess, Vreni Schneider, Brigitte Oertli, Corinne Schmidhauser and Christine von Grünigen.

She was placed ninth at the 1985 Alpine Ski World Championships, but did not qualify for the 1988 Olympic Games in Calgary. Gadient retired from skiing following the 1990/91 season.

== World Cup results ==
Seasons	Position	Location	Country
1983/84	2nd	Waterville Valley	USA
1984/85	2nd	Madonna di Campiglio	ITA
1984/85	3rd	Maribor	SLO
1985/86	2nd	Savognin	SUI
