= Jörgen Sundqvist (alpine skier) =

Swedish alpine skier (born 1962)

Nils Jörgen Sundqvist (born 1 May 1962 in Arvidsjaur) is a Swedish former alpine skier who competed in the 1984 and 1988 Winter Olympics.
