= Marina Kiehl =

German alpine skier

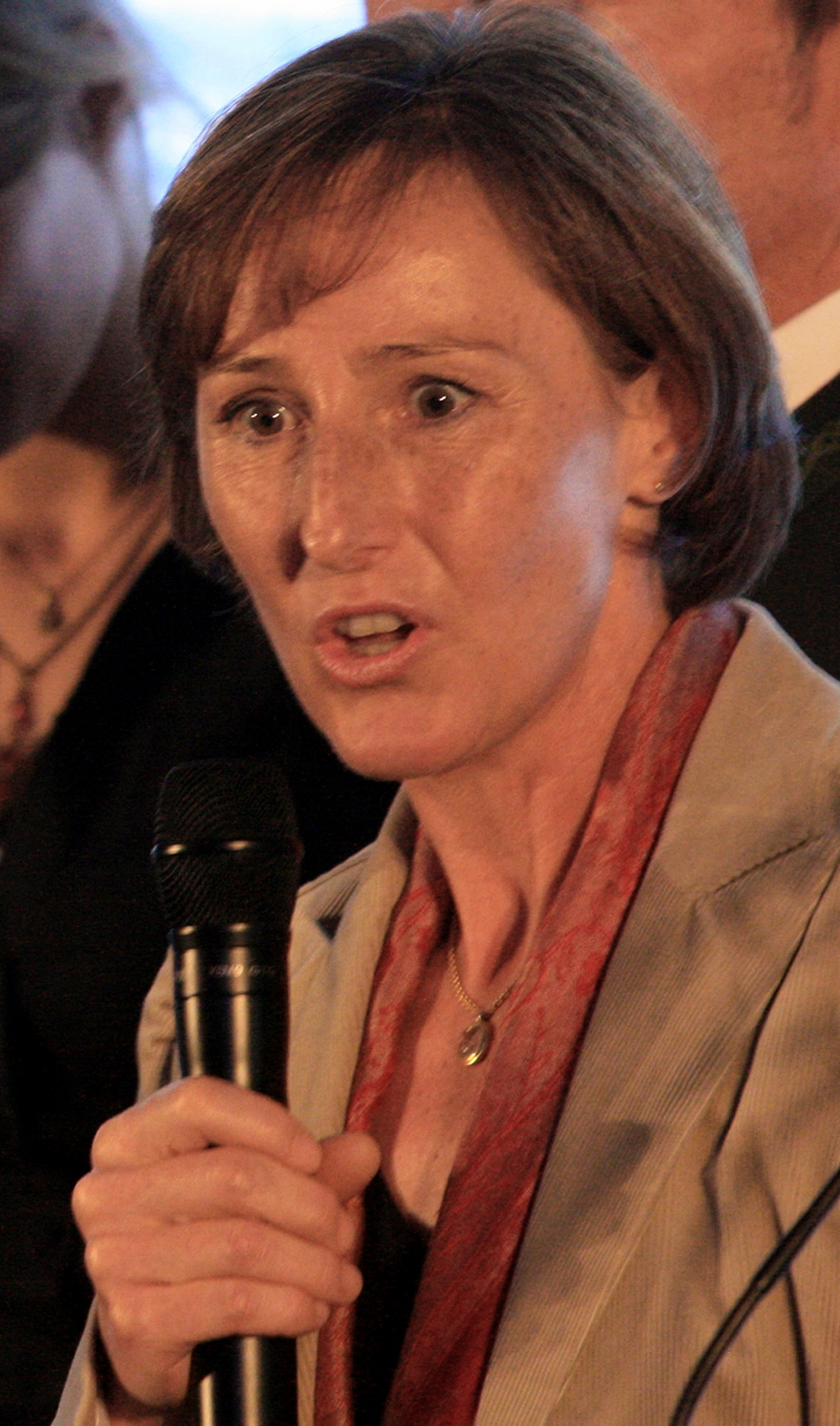
- Marina Kiehl in 2015

Personal information
- Born: 12 January 1965 (age 61) Munich, West Germany
- Height: 1.64 m (5 ft 5 in)
- Weight: 62 kg (137 lb)

Sport
- Sport: Alpine skiing
- Club: TSV 1860 München
Medal record
Representing West Germany
Winter Olympics
Gold medal – first place	1988 Calgary	Downhill

Marina Kiehl (born 12 January 1965) is a former World Cup alpine ski racer from Germany.

== Career ==
Competing for West Germany in the 1980s, Kiehl gained her first World Cup victory in a Super-G competition in March 1984 in Quebec. She won season titles in giant slalom In 1985 and in Super-G in 1986. The major highlight in Kiehl's career came at the 1988 Olympics in Calgary, when she won a gold medal in the downhill, ahead of Brigitte Oertli and Karen Percy.

Kiehl retired from competitions after the Calgary Olympics, aged 23.

== World Cup results ==
=== Season titles ===
Season	Discipline
1985	Giant slalom
1986	Super-G

=== Season standings ===
Season	Age	Overall	Slalom	Giant Slalom	Super G	Downhill	Combined
1982	17	81	—	—	not run	—	30
1983	18	66	—	—	not awarded (w/ GS)	—	24
1984	19	9	—	4	not awarded (w/ GS)	14	9
1985	20	4	—	1	not awarded (w/ GS)	7	7
1986	21	8	—	11	1	10	10
1987	22	10	—	8	3	6	—
1988	23	18	—	13	20	8	—

=== Race victories ===
- 7 wins – (6 SG, 1 GS)
- 18 podiums – (2 DH, 9 SG, 4 GS, 3 K)

Season	Date	Location	Race
1984	4 March 1984	Mont Sainte-Anne, Canada	Super-G
1985	15 December 1984	Madonna di Campiglio, Italy	Giant slalom
1985	26 January 1985	Arosa, Switzerland	Super-G
1985	10 March 1985	Banff, Canada	Super-G
1986	7 December 1985	Sestriere, Italy	Super-G
1986	16 March 1986	(United States) Vail, USA	Super-G
1987	15 March 1987	(United States) Vail, USA	Super-G

== World Championship results ==
Year	Age	Slalom	Giant Slalom	Super-G	Downhill	Combined
1985	20	—	5	not run	11	10
1987	22	—	6	—	4	—

== Olympic results ==
Year	Age	Slalom	Giant Slalom	Super-G	Downhill	Combined
1984	19	—	5	not run	6	not run
1988	23	—	—	13	1	—
