= Gustav Oehrli =

Swiss alpine skier (born 1962)

Gustav Oehrli (born 2 May 1962) is a Swiss former alpine skier.
