= Nadia Bonfini =

Italian alpine skier (born 1965)

Nadia Bonfini (born 28 January 1965 in Tarvisio) is an Italian former alpine skier who competed in the 1988 Winter Olympics. Her main discipline was slalom.

== Biography ==
Bonfini celebrated her first successes at the Junior World Championship 1983 in Sestriere, where she achieved 5th place in slalom and 15th place in giant slalom. In her relatively short World Cup career she reached the podium for the first time on 15 December 1985, with the third place in the slalom of Savognin. On 9 February 1986 she was able to surpass this result with the second place in Vysoké Tatry. She finished 13th in the slalom classification in the 1985/86 season. In the following winter, she managed two more top 10 places before she competed in her last World Cup race on 28 February 1987. In 1986 she became Italian Slalom Champion.

Bonfini had no success at major events: At the 1987 World Championships in Crans-Montana she dropped out in the second slalom round. At the 1988 Olympic Winter Games in Calgary she also never reached the finish line: In slalom she was eliminated in the second run, in giant slalom she was disqualified after the first run.

== Successes ==
=== World Cup ===
- 2 podium positions

=== Junior World Championship ===
- Sestriere 1983: 5th Slalom, 15th Giant Slalom

=== Italian Championships ===
- 1986: Italian Slalom Champion
