= Erwin Resch =

Austrian alpine skier (born 1961)

Medal record

Men's alpine skiing

Representing Austria

World Championships
Bronze medal – third place	1982 Schladming	Downhill

Erwin Resch (born March 4, 1961, in Mariapfarr) is a former Austrian alpine skier. He won three FIS Alpine Ski World Cup events in his career. In 1982, he finished third in the downhill at the Alpine World Ski Championships. He also competed in the men's downhill at the 1984 Winter Olympics.

== World Cup victories ==
Date	Location	Race
December 13, 1981	(Italy) Val Gardena	Downhill
January 9, 1983	(France) Val d'Isère	Downhill
December 4, 1983	(Austria) Schladming	Downhill
