= FIS Alpine World Ski Championships 1987 =

Skiing event in Crans-Montana, Switzerland

Coordinates: 46.31°N 7.48°E

- Host city: Crans-Montana
- Country: Switzerland
- Events: 10
- Opening: 27 January 1987
- Closing: 8 February 1987
- Opened by: Pierre Aubert

Location in the Alps of Europe
Location in Switzerland

The FIS Alpine World Ski Championships 1987 were held in Crans-Montana, Switzerland, from 27 January to 8 February 1987.

The alpine world championships included Super-G for the first time; it was first run on the World Cup level four seasons earlier, in December 1982.

The host Swiss team won eight gold medals out of ten, including all five women's events.

== Men's competitions ==
=== Downhill ===
Date: January 31

Placing	Country	Athlete	Time
1	Switzerland	Peter Müller	2:07:80
2	Switzerland	Pirmin Zurbriggen	2:08.13
3	Switzerland	Karl Alpiger	2:08.20

=== Super-G ===
Date: February 2

Placing	Country	Athlete	Time
1	Switzerland	Pirmin Zurbriggen	1:19.93
2	Luxembourg	Marc Girardelli	1:20.80
3	West Germany	Markus Wasmeier	1:21.08

=== Giant Slalom ===
Date: February 4

Placing	Country	Athlete	Time	Run 1	Run 2
1	Switzerland	Pirmin Zurbriggen	2:32.38	1:17.52	1:14.86
2	Luxembourg	Marc Girardelli	2:32.45	1:17.93	1:14.52
3	Italy	Alberto Tomba	2:33.13	1:17.88	1:15.25

=== Slalom ===
Date: February 8

Placing	Country	Athlete	Time	Run 1	Run 2
1	West Germany	Frank Wörndl	1:54.63	1:00.60	54.03
2	Austria	Günther Mader	1:54.82	1:00.96	53.86
3	West Germany	Armin Bittner	1:55.03	1:00.59	54.44

=== Combination ===
Date: January 27, February 1

Placing	Country	Athlete	Points
1	Luxembourg	Marc Girardelli	28.27
2	Switzerland	Pirmin Zurbriggen	30.54
3	Austria	Günther Mader	41.96

== Women's competitions ==
=== Downhill ===
Date: February 1

Placing	Country	Athlete	Time
1	Switzerland	Maria Walliser	1:43.80
2	Switzerland	Michela Figini	1:44.11
3	West Germany	Regine Mösenlechner	1:44.86

=== Super-G ===
Date: February 3

Placing	Country	Athlete	Time
1	Switzerland	Maria Walliser	1:19.17
2	Switzerland	Michela Figini	1:20.18
3	Yugoslavia	Mateja Svet	1.20.23

=== Giant Slalom ===
Date: February 5

Placing	Country	Athlete	Time	Run 1	Run 2
1	Switzerland	Vreni Schneider	2:21.22	1:09.96	1:11.26
2	Yugoslavia	Mateja Svet	2:21.78	1:10.84	1:10.94
3	Switzerland	Maria Walliser	2:23.51	1:12.49	1:11.02

=== Slalom ===
Date: February 7

Placing	Country	Athlete	Time	Run 1	Run 2
1	Switzerland	Erika Hess	1:33.30	46.79	46.51
2	Austria	Roswitha Steiner	1:33.55	45.46	48.09
3	Yugoslavia	Mateja Svet	1:34.39	47.23	47.16

=== Combination ===
Date: January 29–30

Placing	Country	Athlete	Points
1	Switzerland	Erika Hess	15.32
2	Austria	Sylvia Eder	18.66
3	United States	Tamara McKinney	24.41

== Medals table ==
Place	Nation	Gold	Silver	Bronze	Total
1	Switzerland	8	4	2	14
2	Luxembourg	1	2	-	3
3	West Germany	1	-	3	4
4	Austria	-	3	1	4
5	Yugoslavia	-	1	2	3
6	Italy	-	-	1	1
	United States	-	-	1	1
