= Robert Erlacher =

Italian alpine skier (born 1963)

Personal information
- Born: 16 September 1963 (age 63) Corvara, Italy
- Height: 1.76 m (5 ft 9 in)

Skiing career
- Sport: Alpine skiing
- Retired: 1989

Olympics
- Teams: 1

World Cup
- Wins: 1
- Podiums: 9
Medal record
World Cup race podiums
Event	1st	2nd	3rd
Super-G	0	2	0
Giant	1	3	3
Total	1	5	3

Robert Erlacher (born 16 September 1963) is an Italian former alpine skier.

== Career ==
He won a race in World Cup and competed in the 1984 Winter Olympics.
