= Sieglinde Winkler =

Austrian alpine skier

Personal information
- Born: 30 March 1966 (age 60) Ferlach, Austria

Skiing career
- Sport: Alpine skiing
- Retired: 1987
- Disciplines: Speed events
- World Cup debut: 1982

World Cup
- Seasons: 6
- Podiums: 3
Medal record
Women's alpine skiing
Representing Austria
World Cup race podiums
Event	1st	2nd	3rd
Downhill	0	1	1
Super-G	0	1	0
Total	0	2	1

Sieglinde Winkler (born 30 March 1966) is a former Austrian alpine skier.

== Career ==
During her career she has achieved 3 results among the top 3 in the World Cup.

== World Cup results ==
Top 3

Date	Place	Discipline	Rank
10-01-1987	(Austria) Mellau	Downhill	3
02-03-1986	(Japan) Furano	Super G	2
11-01-1986	(Austria) Bad Gastein	Downhill	2
