= Traudl Hächer =

German alpine skier (born 1962)

Medal record

Women's alpine skiing

World Championships
Bronze medal – third place	1991 Saalbach-Hinterglemm	Giant Slalom

Traudl Hächer (born 31 December 1962 in Schleching) is a retired German alpine skier.

== World Cup victories ==
Date	Location	Race
8 December 1984	(Switzerland) Davos	Super-G
17 January 1986	(France) Puy St Vincent	Super-G
20 January 1986	(West Germany) Oberstaufen	Giant Slalom
9 March 1986	(Canada) Banff	Giant Slalom
