= Heidi Zeller-Bähler =

Swiss alpine skier (born 1967)

Heidi Zeller-Bähler (born 25 July 1967) is a former Swiss alpine skier.
