= Dietmar Köhlbichler =

Austrian alpine skier (born 1963)

Personal information
- Born: 13 September 1963 (age 62) Breitenwang, Austria

Skiing career
- Sport: Alpine skiing
- Retired: 1988
- Disciplines: Technical events
- World Cup debut: 1985

World Cup
- Seasons: 4
- Podiums: 2
- Overall titles: 0 (29th in 1987)
- Discipline titles: 0 (7th in 1987 SL)
Medal record
Men's alpine skiing
Representing Austria
World Cup race podiums
Event	1st	2nd	3rd
Slalom	0	1	1

Dietmar Köhlbichler (born 13 September 1963) is an Austrian former alpine skier.

== World Cup results ==
Podiums

Date	Place	Discipline	Rank
18-01-1987	(Switzerland) Wengen	Slalom	2
19-01-1986	(Austria) Kitzbuehel	Slalom	3

== Europa Cup results ==
Kohlbichler has won an overall Europa Cup and one discipline cup.

- FIS Alpine Ski Europa Cup
  - Overall: 1984
  - Slalom: 1984
