= Richard Pramotton =

Italian alpine skier

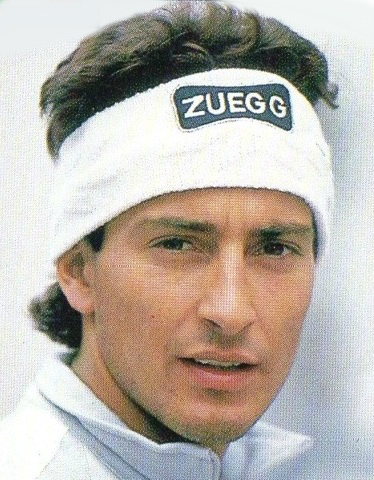

Personal information
- Born: 9 May 1964 Courmayeur, Italy

Skiing career
- Sport: Alpine skiing
- Club: C.S. Esercito
- Retired: 1995
- World Cup debut: 1984

World Cup
- Seasons: 10
- Wins: 3
- Podiums: 10
- Overall titles: 0 (best 5th 1987)
- Discipline titles: 0 (best 3rd GS 1987)
Medal record
Men's alpine skiing
Representing Italy
World Cup race podiums
Event	1st	2nd	3rd
Slalom	0	1	1
Giant slalom	3	1	3
Super-G	0	1	0
Total	3	3	4

Richard Pramotton (born 9 May 1964) is an Italian former alpine skier.

== Biography ==
The brother of other alpine skier Roger, he was born at Courmayeur. He was a specialist of giant slalom, a discipline in which he scored three victories, all in 1986. He was the first Italian after the age of Gustav Thöni and Piero Gros to classify in the top five of the Alpine Skiing World Cup, with a fifth position overall in 1987.

== World Cup results ==
Race victories

Date	Location	Discipline
28 January 1986	Adelboden, Switzerland	Giant slalom
30 November 1986	Sestriere, Italy	Giant slalom
14 December 1986	Alta Badia, Italy	Giant slalom

== See also ==
- Italy national alpine ski team at the Olympics
- Italian skiers who closed in top 10 in overall World Cup
