= Monika Hess =

Swiss alpine skier (born 1964)

Personal information
- Nationality: Swiss
- Born: 24 May 1964 (age 61) Engelberg, Switzerland

Sport
- Country: Switzerland
- Sport: Skiing
- Event(s): Slalom, Giant Slalom, Combined
- Retired: 1987
- Updated on 25 August 2012

Monika Hess (born 24 May 1964 in Stans) is a Swiss former alpine skier who competed in the 1984 Winter Olympics. Monika is a cousin of Erika Hess. She became 11th in the Slalom and 15th in the Giant Slalom in the 1984 Winter Olympics. In the FIS Alpine Skiing World Championships 1982 she was second placed (behind her cousin Erika) after the first leg but didn't finish the second leg. Monika did win a race in the World Cup: The Alpine Combined Megève / Saint-Gervais-les-Bains on January 25–26, 1986. She retired in 1987.

She is married to the politician Hans Wicki, a member to the Ständerat. The couple lives (with one daughter and on son) in Hergiswil.
