= Liisa Savijarvi =

Canadian alpine skier (born 1963)

Personal information
- Born: 29 December 1963 (age 62) Bracebridge, Ontario

Skiing career
- Sport: Alpine skiing ♀
- Disciplines: Downhill; Super G; Giant slalom

Liisa Savijarvi (born 29 December 1963 in Bracebridge, Ontario) is a Canadian former skier.

== Career ==
Her career in Alpine skiing started with the Southern Ontario Division Ski team in December 1978. She made many appearances at the Canadian Alpine Championships and the FIS World Cup. She was part of Canada's team at the 1984 Winter Olympics in Sarajevo, attaining 9th place in the giant slalom and 18th place in the Downhill.

She achieved a number of podium places on the FIS World Cup schedule, including winning a Super-G in Furano, Japan.

Her career officially ended in 1988, following serious injuries sustained during a FIS World Cup training run on 17 March 1987 in Vail, Colorado. She was inducted into the Canadian Ski Hall of Fame in 1997.
