= Furano Ski Resort =

Ski resort in Hokkaido, Japan

Coordinates: 43.324°N 142.352°E

Furano Ski Area
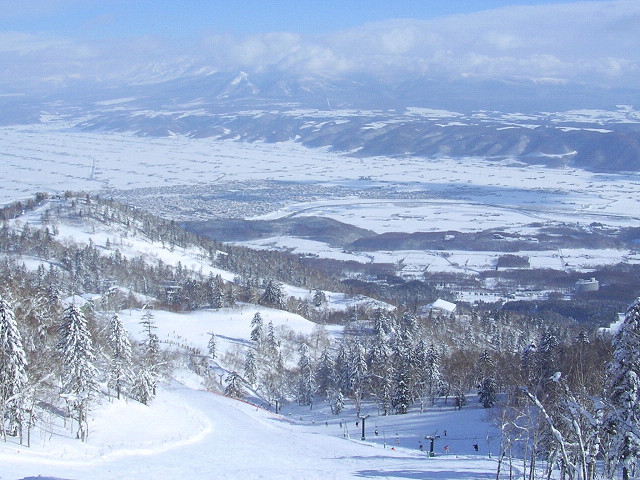
- Furano Ski Resort
- Interactive map of Furano Ski Area
- Location: Nakagoryo, Furano, Hokkaido, Japan
- Vertical: 964 m (3,163 ft)
- Top elevation: 1,209 m (3,967 ft)
- Base elevation: 245 m (804 ft)
- Skiable area: 1.90 km^{2} (469.5 acres)
- Trails: 23
- Longest run: 4.0 km (2.5 mi)
- Lift system: 11 ski lifts
- Website: Furano Ski Area

Furano Ski Resort (富良野スキー場, Furano Sukii-jō), also known as Furano Ski Area, is a resort in Furano, Hokkaido, Japan, owned and operated by Prince Hotels. The resort has hosted events by the International Ski Federation (FIS) Alpine Ski World Cup. In recent years, it has hosted the mid-February Snowboarding World Cup. Growing interest from international winter sports enthusiasts, particularly from Australia, has led to an annual rise in tourist numbers.

The resort generally operates from late November to early May.

== Accommodation ==
Accommodation options are available in three main areas: the base of the Furano Zone, the base of the Kitanomine Zone, and downtown Furano. The base of the Kitanomine Zone offers a variety of lodging options, including hotels, guesthouses, self-contained condominiums, and backpacker lodgings. In the Furano Zone, the only accommodation adjacent to the lifts is the ski-in ski-out New Furano Prince Hotel.

== Transport ==
The public bus service, “Lavender,” operates from the New Furano Prince Hotel, passing through the Kitanomine resort area and into downtown Furano. At night, a Resort Shuttle bus runs from the New Furano Prince Hotel to downtown Furano, passing through Kitanomine.

=== Airports ===
- Asahikawa Airport is the closest Airport to Furano. A public bus service is available from Asahikawa Airport. Alternatively, Hokkaido Resort Liner operates a reserved-seat service.
- New Chitose Airport: From New Chitose Airport Hokkaido Resort Liner operates a bus service several times a day directly to Furano. This bus must be booked in advance and operates only during the winter.

=== Railways ===
People coming from Asahikawa can take the Furano Line directly to Furano Station. Those coming from the New Chitose Airport, Sapporo, and Takikawa areas can go through JR Nemuro Main Line, and there is also a direct, limited express train with short transit times that runs seasonally from Sapporo.

=== Buses ===
A bus route operated by Furano Bus Systems runs between Asahikawa Station, Asahikawa Airport, and Furano Station. The transit time from Asahikawa Station to the ski area is around one and a half hours. From the airport, the journey takes roughly seventy minutes. For people coming from the town below, it is only ten minutes from the train station to the ski area. There are also direct routes running from various hotels inside the cities of Asahikawa and Sapporo. However, these only run during the winter months. The Northliner, an intercity bus operating between Furano and Obihiro, stops at Kyokai Byoin (協会病院), the large hospital in the heart of the city. A bus from Shimukappu also runs; however, it avoids the ski resort area altogether, only going as far as Furano Station.

=== Automobiles ===
- National Highway 237, running very near the Asahikawa Airport, connects Asahikawa and Furano. From New Chitose Airport and the Greater Sapporo Area, Hokkaido Prefectural Roads provide access to Furano.

== Ski slopes ==
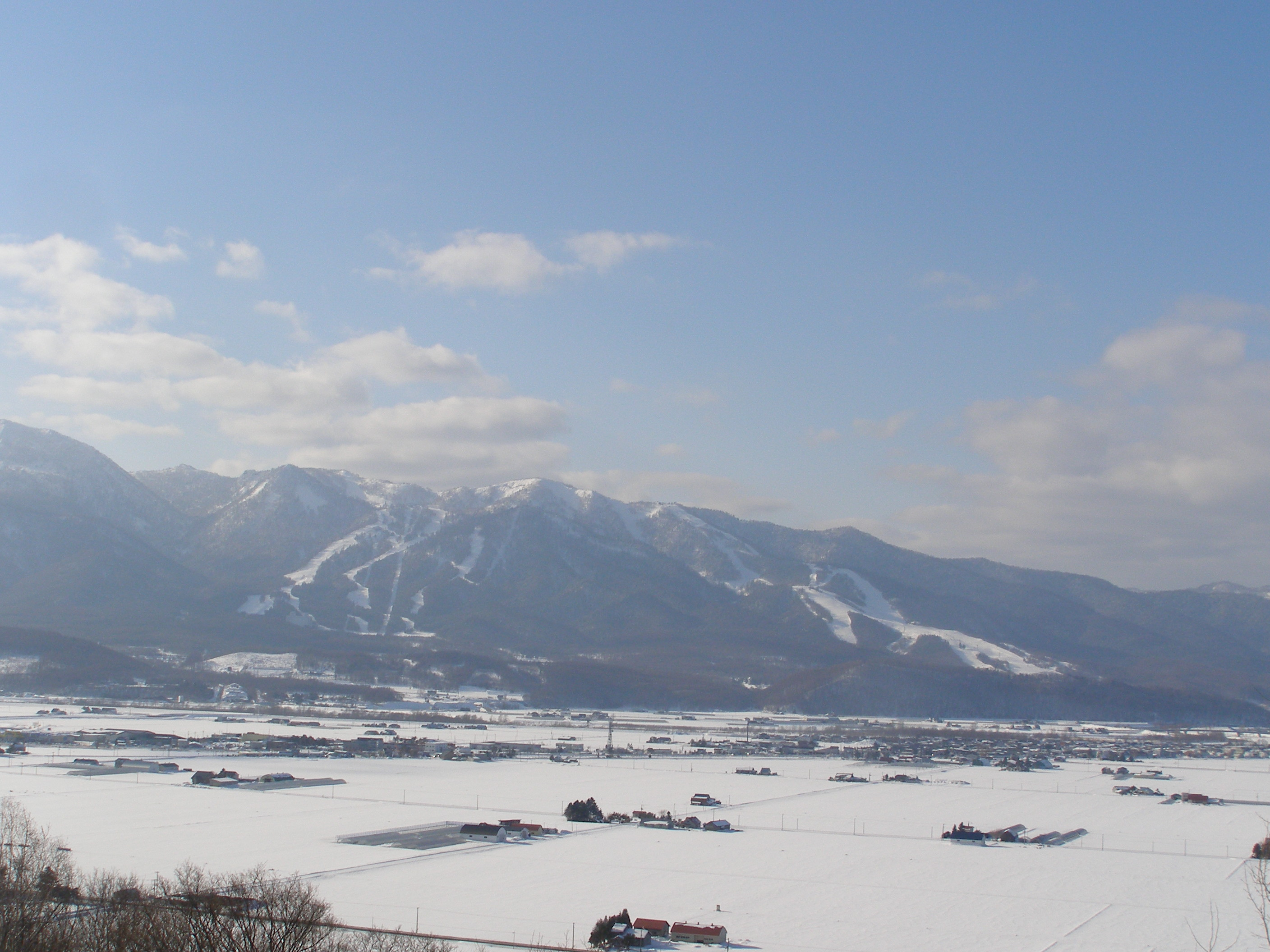
Furano Zone (L) and the Kitanomine Zone (R)

- Furano Ski Resort is divided into two areas: the Furano Zone and the Kitanomine Zone.
- The 24 courses are serviced by a series of lifts and gondolas.

== Lift statistics ==
| Name | Capacity | Length (m) | Velocity (m/s) | Remarks |
|---|---|---|---|---|
| Furano Ropeway | 101 | 2,330 | 10 |
| Furano Downhill Highspeed Lift 1 | 4 | 1,944 | 4.0 | With hood |
| Prince Romance Lift | 2 | 601 | 1.6 |
| Downhill Romance Lift 2 | 2 | 786 | 2.0 |
| Downhill Lift 3 | 2 | 567 | 2.0 |
| Kitanomine Gondola | 6 | 2,958 | 5.0 |
| Kitanomine Highspeed Lift 1 | 4 | 1,058 | 4.0 |
| Kitanomine Romance Lift 2 | 2 | 720 | 2.0 |
| Kitanomine A and B Lines 3 | 1 | 1,090 | ? |
| Link Lift | 2 | 931 | ? |
