= 1982–83 FIS Alpine Ski World Cup =

International sports competition

FIS Alpine Ski World Cup 1982/83
Discipline	Men	Women
Overall	(United States) Phil Mahre	(United States) Tamara McKinney
Downhill	(Austria) Franz Klammer	(Switzerland) Doris de Agostini
Giant Slalom/Super G	(United States) Phil Mahre	(United States) Tamara McKinney
Slalom	(Sweden) Ingemar Stenmark	(Switzerland) Erika Hess
Combined	(United States) Phil Mahre	(Liechtenstein) Hanni Wenzel
Nations Cup	Switzerland	Switzerland
- Nations Cup overall: Switzerland

Competition
Locations	20	17
Individual	37	30

The 17th season of World Cup competition began in December 1982 in Switzerland and concluded in March 1983 in Japan. For the first time, the overall titles were both won by Americans, Tamara McKinney and Phil Mahre. Mahre won his third consecutive overall World Cup title; McKinney became the first American woman (and third North American, after Mahre and Nancy Greene of Canada) to win the overall title.

A major change in the World Cup series this year was the introduction of a new race, considered to be a combination of downhill and giant slalom, which was named "Super G". Because there were only five Super G races held during the season (three men's events and two ladies' events), the races were classified with the Giant Slalom discipline for the season awards (as well as for the next two seasons). Another major change was made to remove the World Cup/Olympics overlap. The FIS decided not to hold the 1984 World Championships at the 1984 Olympics but instead to move the biennial event to odd-numbered years, starting with 1985. Thus, this was the final odd-numbered year without scheduled World Championships.

== Calendar ==
=== Men ===
Event Key: DH – Downhill, SL – Slalom, GS – Giant Slalom, SG – Super Giant Slalom, KB Combined, PS – Parallel Slalom (Nations Cup ranking only)
Race	Season	Date	Place	Type	Winner	Second	Third
414	1	5 December 1982	(Switzerland) Pontresina	DH _{123}	(Austria) Harti Weirather	(Austria) Franz Klammer	(Switzerland) Peter Müller
415	2	12 December 1982	(France) Val d'Isère	SG _{001}	(Switzerland) Peter Müller	(Switzerland) Peter Lüscher	(Switzerland) Pirmin Zurbriggen
416	3	14 December 1982	(Italy) Courmayeur	SL _{135}	(Sweden) Ingemar Stenmark	(Sweden) Stig Strand	(United States) Phil Mahre
417	4	19 December 1982	(Italy) Val Gardena	DH _{124}	(Switzerland) Conradin Cathomen	(Austria) Erwin Resch	(Austria) Franz Klammer
418	5	12 December 1982; 19 December 1982	(France) Val d'Isère (SG) (Italy) Val Gardena (DH1)	KB _{028}	(Switzerland) Franz Heinzer	(Switzerland) Peter Müller	(Switzerland) Peter Lüscher
419	6	20 December 1982	(Italy) Val Gardena	DH _{125}	(Austria) Franz Klammer	(Switzerland) Peter Müller	(Switzerland) Urs Räber
420	7	21 December 1982	(Italy) Madonna di Campiglio	SL _{136}	(Sweden) Stig Strand	(Sweden) Ingemar Stenmark	(United States) Phil Mahre
421	8	22 December 1982	(Italy) Madonna di Campiglio	SG _{002}	(Italy) Michael Mair	(Austria) Hans Enn	(Switzerland) Pirmin Zurbriggen
422	9	22 December 1982	(Italy) Madonna di Campiglio	KB _{029}	(Switzerland) Pirmin Zurbriggen	(Austria) Christian Orlainsky	(Austria) Franz Gruber
423	10	4 January 1983	(Switzerland) Parpan	SL _{137}	(United States) Steve Mahre	(Switzerland) Jacques Lüthy	(Liechtenstein) Andreas Wenzel
424	11	9 January 1983	(France) Val d'Isere	DH _{126}	(Austria) Erwin Resch	(Switzerland) Peter Lüscher	(Switzerland) Conradin Cathomen
425	12	10 January 1983	(France) Val d'Isere	DH _{127}	(Switzerland) Conradin Cathomen	(Canada) Ken Read	(Italy) Danilo Sbardellotto
426	13	11 January 1983	(Switzerland) Adelboden	GS _{130}	(Switzerland) Pirmin Zurbriggen	(Switzerland) Max Julen	(Switzerland) Jacques Lüthy
427	14	21 January 1983	(Austria) Kitzbühel	DH _{128}	(Switzerland) Bruno Kernen	(Canada) Steve Podborski	(Switzerland) Urs Räber
428	15	22 January 1983	(Austria) Kitzbühel	DH _{129}	(Canada) Todd Brooker	(Switzerland) Urs Räber	(Canada) Ken Read
429	16	23 January 1983	(Austria) Kitzbühel	SL _{138}	(Sweden) Ingemar Stenmark	(Austria) Christian Orlainsky	(United States) Phil Mahre
430	17	23 January 1983	(Austria) Kitzbühel	KB _{030}	(United States) Phil Mahre	(Luxembourg) Marc Girardelli	(Switzerland) Peter Lüscher
431	18	28 January 1983	(Socialist Federal Republic of Yugoslavia) Sarajevo	DH _{130}	(Austria) Gerhard Pfaffenbichler	(Canada) Steve Podborski	(Austria) Franz Klammer
432	19	29 January 1983	(Socialist Federal Republic of Yugoslavia) Kranjska Gora	GS _{131}	(Austria) Hans Enn	(Switzerland) Max Julen	(Sweden) Ingemar Stenmark
433	20	30 January 1983	(Socialist Federal Republic of Yugoslavia) Kranjska Gora	SL _{139}	(Austria) Franz Gruber	(Sweden) Stig Strand	(France) Michel Canac
434	21	5 February 1983	(Austria) St. Anton	DH _{131}	(Switzerland) Peter Lüscher	(Switzerland) Silvano Meli	(Austria) Harti Weirather
435	22	6 February 1983	(Austria) St. Anton	SL _{140}	(United States) Steve Mahre	(Liechtenstein) Andreas Wenzel	(United States) Phil Mahre
436	23	6 February 1983	(Austria) St. Anton	KB _{031}	(United States) Phil Mahre	(Liechtenstein) Andreas Wenzel	(United States) Steve Mahre
437	24	9 February 1983	(West Germany) Garmisch	SG _{003}	(Switzerland) Peter Lüscher	(Switzerland) Pirmin Zurbriggen	(Austria) Hans Enn
438	25	11 February 1983	(France) Markstein	SL _{141}	(Sweden) Ingemar Stenmark	(Italy) Paolo De Chiesa	(United States) Phil Mahre
439	26	21 January 1983; 11 February 1983	(Austria) Kitzbühel (DH1) (France) Markstein (SL1)	KB _{032}	(United States) Phil Mahre	(Liechtenstein) Andreas Wenzel	(Luxembourg) Marc Girardelli
440	27	12 February 1983	(France) Markstein	SL _{142}	(Socialist Federal Republic of Yugoslavia) Bojan Križaj	(Sweden) Bengt Fjällberg	(Austria) Christian Orlainsky
441	28	13 February 1983	(West Germany) Todtnau	GS _{132}	(Sweden) Ingemar Stenmark	(Switzerland) Max Julen	(Switzerland) Pirmin Zurbriggen
442	29	23 February 1983	(Sweden) Tärnaby	SL _{143}	(Liechtenstein) Andreas Wenzel	(Sweden) Stig Strand	(Socialist Federal Republic of Yugoslavia) Bojan Križaj
443	30	26 February 1983	(Sweden) Gällivare	GS _{133}	(Sweden) Ingemar Stenmark	(United States) Phil Mahre (Switzerland) Max Julen	
444	31	27 February 1983	(Sweden) Gällivare	SL _{144}	(Luxembourg) Marc Girardelli	(Sweden) Stig Strand	(Sweden) Ingemar Stenmark
445	32	6 March 1983	(United States) Aspen	DH _{132}	(Canada) Todd Brooker	(Italy) Michael Mair	(Austria) Helmut Höflehner
446	33	7 March 1983	(United States) Aspen	GS _{134}	(United States) Phil Mahre	(Luxembourg) Marc Girardelli	(Sweden) Ingemar Stenmark
447	34	8 March 1983	(United States) Vail	GS _{135}	(United States) Phil Mahre	(Sweden) Ingemar Stenmark	(Austria) Max Julen
448	35	12 March 1983	(Canada) Lake Louise	DH _{133}	(Austria) Helmut Höflehner	(Austria) Franz Klammer	(Switzerland) Conradin Cathomen
449	36	19 March 1983	(Japan) Furano	GS _{136}	(United States) Phil Mahre	(Switzerland) Max Julen	(Sweden) Ingemar Stenmark
450	37	20 March 1983	(Japan) Furano	SL _{145}	(Sweden) Stig Strand	(Liechtenstein) Andreas Wenzel	(Socialist Federal Republic of Yugoslavia) Bojan Križaj
Nations Cup		21 March 1983	(Japan) Furano	PS _{ncr}	(Sweden) Ingemar Stenmark	(United States) Phil Mahre	(Liechtenstein) Andreas Wenzel

=== Women ===
Event Key: DH – Downhill, SL – Slalom, GS – Giant Slalom, SG – Super Giant Slalom, KB – Combined, PS – Parallel Slalom (Nations Cup ranking only)
Race	Season	Date	Place	Type	Winner	Second	Third
	1	7 December 1982	(France) Val d'Isère	DH	(Switzerland) Doris de Agostini	(Austria) Lea Sölkner	(Switzerland) Maria Walliser
392	2	8 December 1982	(France) Val d'Isère	GS _{123}	(Switzerland) Erika Hess	(United States) Tamara McKinney	(Liechtenstein) Hanni Wenzel
393	3	8 December 1982	(France) Val d'Isère	KB _{027}	(Austria) Elisabeth Kirchler	(United States) Tamara McKinney	(Switzerland) Erika Hess
394	4	10 December 1982	(Italy) Limone Piemonte	SL _{135}	(United States) Tamara McKinney	(Switzerland) Erika Hess	(Liechtenstein) Hanni Wenzel
395	5	15 December 1982	(Italy) San Sicario	DH _{109}	(France) Caroline Attia	(France) Claudine Emonet	(West Germany) Heidi Wiesler
396	6	17 December 1982	(Italy) Piancavallo	SL _{136}	(Switzerland) Erika Hess	(France) Perrine Pelen	(United States) Christin Cooper
397	7	15 December 1982; 17 December 1982	(Italy) San Sicario (DH) (Italy) Piancavallo (SL)	KB _{028}	(United States) Christin Cooper	(Switzerland) Erika Hess	(Liechtenstein) Hanni Wenzel
398	8	9 January 1983	(Switzerland) Verbier	SG _{001}	(West Germany) Irene Epple	(Liechtenstein) Hanni Wenzel	(United States) Tamara McKinney
399	9	10 January 1983	(Switzerland) Verbier	SG _{002}	(United States) Cindy Nelson	(Switzerland) Zoe Haas	(West Germany) Irene Epple
400	10	11 January 1983	(Switzerland) Davos	SL _{137}	(United States) Tamara McKinney	(Switzerland) Erika Hess	(France) Perrine Pelen
	11	14 January 1983	(Austria) Schruns	DH	(Switzerland) Doris de Agostini	(France) Élisabeth Chaud	(France) Caroline Attia
402	12	16 January 1983	(Austria) Schruns	SL _{138}	(Austria) Anni Kronbichler	(Italy) Maria Rosa Quario (Poland) Małgorzata Tlałka	
403	13	21 January 1983	(France) Megève	DH _{111}	(Switzerland) Maria Walliser	(United States) Maria Maricich	(France) Marie-Luce Waldmeier
404	14	16 January 1983; 21 January 1983	(Austria) Schruns (SL) (France) Megève (DH1)	KB _{029}	(Czechoslovakia) Olga Charvátová	(Austria) Sylvia Eder	(France) Fabienne Serrat
	15	22 January 1983	(France) Megève	DH	(Austria) Elisabeth Kirchler	(Switzerland) Doris de Agostini	(France) Caroline Attia
406	16	23 January 1983	(France) St. Gervais	GS _{124}	(United States) Tamara McKinney	(United States) Christin Cooper	(France) Carole Merle
	17	29 January 1983	(Switzerland) Les Diablerets	DH	(Switzerland) Doris de Agostini	(Austria) Elisabeth Kirchler	(Austria) Veronika Vitzthum
408	18	30 January 1983	(Switzerland) Les Diablerets	SL _{139}	(Italy) Maria Rosa Quario	(Liechtenstein) Hanni Wenzel	(Poland) Dorota Tlałka
409	19	30 January 1983	(Switzerland) Les Diablerets	KB _{030}	(Liechtenstein) Hanni Wenzel	(West Germany) Michaela Gerg	(Austria) Elisabeth Kirchler
410	20	5 February 1983	(Socialist Federal Republic of Yugoslavia) Sarajevo	DH _{114}	(Switzerland) Maria Walliser	(Austria) Elisabeth Kirchler	(Switzerland) Ariane Ehrat
411	21	9 February 1983	(Socialist Federal Republic of Yugoslavia) Maribor	SL _{140}	(Switzerland) Erika Hess	(Liechtenstein) Hanni Wenzel	(Austria) Anni Kronbichler
412	22	12 February 1983	(Czechoslovakia) Vysoké Tatry	SL _{141}	(Italy) Maria Rosa Quario	(Switzerland) Erika Hess	(Poland) Małgorzata Tlałka
413	23	5 March 1983	(Canada) Mont Tremblant	DH _{115}	(Canada) Laurie Graham	(Switzerland) Maria Walliser	(Switzerland) Michela Figini
414	24	6 March 1983	(Canada) Mont Tremblant	GS _{125}	(France) Anne Flore Rey	(West Germany) Maria Epple	(Switzerland) Erika Hess
415	25	8 March 1983	(United States) Waterville Valley	SL _{142}	(Austria) Roswitha Steiner	(United States) Tamara McKinney	(Liechtenstein) Hanni Wenzel
416	26	9 March 1983	(United States) Waterville Valley	GS _{126}	(United States) Tamara McKinney	(West Germany) Maria Epple	(France) Fabienne Serrat
417	27	10 March 1983	(United States) Waterville Valley	GS _{127}	(United States) Tamara McKinney	(West Germany) Maria Epple	(United States) Cindy Nelson
418	28	12 March 1983	(United States) Vail	GS _{128}	(United States) Tamara McKinney	(United States) Cindy Nelson	(Switzerland) Erika Hess
419	29	18 March 1983	(Japan) Furano	GS _{129}	(Liechtenstein) Hanni Wenzel	(France) Fabienne Serrat	(Switzerland) Maria Walliser
420	30	20 March 1983	(Japan) Furano	SL _{143}	(United States) Tamara McKinney	(Switzerland) Erika Hess	(Poland) Małgorzata Tlałka
Nations Cup		21 March 1983	(Japan) Furano	PS _{ncp}	(France) Anne-Flore Rey	(Liechtenstein) Hanni Wenzel	(Austria) Anni Kronbichler

== Men ==
=== Overall ===
see complete table

In Men's Overall World Cup 1982/83 the best five downhills, best five giant slaloms/Super G, best five slaloms and best three combined count. The parallel slalom only counts for the Nationscup (or was a show-event). 32 racers had a point deduction. Phil Mahre won his third Overall World Cup in a row.

Place	Name	Country	Total	DH	GS SG	SL	KB
1	Phil Mahre	United States	285	28	107	75	75
2	Ingemar Stenmark	Sweden	218	0	100	110	8
3	Andreas Wenzel	Liechtenstein	177	7	38	92	40
4	Marc Girardelli	Luxembourg	168	0	52	69	47
5	Peter Lüscher	Switzerland	164	72	51	0	41
6	Pirmin Zurbriggen	Switzerland	161	11	90	13	47
7	Peter Müller	Switzerland	125	71	27	0	27
8	Max Julen	Switzerland	116	0	100	13	3
9	Bojan Križaj	Yugoslavia	112	0	22	78	12
	Franz Gruber	Austria	112	0	31	66	15
11	Stig Strand	Sweden	110	0	0	110	0
12	Steve Mahre	United States	108	0	13	80	15
13	Harti Weirather	Austria	102	74	16	0	12
14	Conradin Cathomen	Switzerland	100	92	0	0	8
15	Urs Räber	Switzerland	99	72	0	0	27
	Christian Orlainsky	Austria	99	0	17	62	20
17	Jacques Lüthy	Switzerland	96	0	44	42	10
18	Franz Klammer	Austria	95	95	0	0	0
19	Silvano Meli	Switzerland	85	56	0	0	29
20	Hans Enn	Austria	84	0	83	0	1

=== Downhill ===
see complete table

In Men's Downhill World Cup 1982/83 the best 5 results count. 13 racers had a point deduction, which are given in (). Franz Klammer won the cup with only one win. He won his fifth Downhill World Cup.

Place	Name	Country	Total	1	4	6	11	12	14	15	18	21	32	35
1	Franz Klammer	Austria	95	20	15	25	(4)	(11)	-	(10)	15	(8)	(3)	20
2	Conradin Cathomen	Switzerland	92	12	25	(7)	15	25	-	(1)	-	-	(8)	15
3	Harti Weirather	Austria	74	25	(10)	11	(10)	-	11	(5)	(5)	15	12	(5)
4	Erwin Resch	Austria	73	-	20	-	25	-	-	(2)	(3)	5	11	12
5	Urs Räber	Switzerland	72	(6)	12	15	(7)	10	15	20	(9)	-	(9)	(7)
	Peter Lüscher	Switzerland	72	-	-	-	20	-	9	8	10	25	-	-
7	Peter Müller	Switzerland	71	15	-	20	-	12	12	12	-	-	(10)	(12)
8	Ken Read	Canada	69	(10)	11	(9)	12	20	(3)	15	11	-	(5)	-
9	Todd Brooker	Canada	67	-	5	10	-	-	-	25	2	(1)	25	-
10	Helmut Höflehner	Austria	65	11	7	(4)	-	(5)	(6)	-	7	(2)	15	25
11	Steve Podborski	Canada	63	4	-	-	-	-	20	7	20	12	-	-
12	Silvano Meli	Switzerland	56	(5)	-	-	9	7	8	12	(6)	20	-	(4)
13	Bruno Kernen	Switzerland	55	(3)	-	6	-	9	25	9	(1)	-	(4)	6
14	Michael Mair	Italy	48	-	2	-	11	3	-	-	12	-	20	-
15	Leonhard Stock	Austria	41	-	8	8	6	(4)	-	(4)	-	9	-	10
16	Gerhard Pfaffenbichler	Austria	40	-	-	-	-	-	-	-	25	-	6	9

=== Giant Slalom / Super G ===
see complete table

In Men's Giant Slalom and Super G World Cup 1982/83 the best 5 results count. Nine racers had a point deduction, which are given in (). Peter Müller won the first ever World Cup Super G. Phil Mahre won the cup with all of his counted results collected in Giant Slaloms.

Place	Name	Country	Total	2SG	8SG	13	19	24SG	28	30	33	34	36
1	Phil Mahre	United States	107	-	-	(5)	(11)	-	12	20	25	25	25
2	Ingemar Stenmark	Sweden	100	-	-	(9)	15	(5)	25	25	15	20	(15)
	Max Julen	Switzerland	100	-	-	20	20	(3)	20	20	(12)	(15)	20
4	Pirmin Zurbriggen	Switzerland	90	15	15	25	(4)	20	15	(7)	(8)	-	(11)
5	Hans Enn	Austria	83	(10)	20	(4)	25	15	-	-	(7)	11	12
6	Marc Girardelli	Luxembourg	52	-	-	9	6	7	10	-	20	-	-
7	Peter Lüscher	Switzerland	51	20	2	-	-	25	-	-	-	-	4
8	Jure Franko	Yugoslavia	50	9	10	11	(7)	(8)	-	9	11	-	(1)
	Robert Erlacher	Italy	50	(4)	(5)	-	12	(6)	8	-	9	12	9
10	Jacques Lüthy	Switzerland	44	-	-	15	9	9	-	10	1	-	-
11	Boris Strel	Yugoslavia	43	-	-	-	5	(5)	10	11	-	7	10
12	Andreas Wenzel	Liechtenstein	38	2	(1)	10	(1)	12	11	-	3	-	-
13	Thomas Bürgler	Switzerland	36	11	-	7	8	-	1	-	-	9	-
14	Franz Gruber	Austria	31	-	3	-	-	-	5	8	-	10	5
15	Hubert Strolz	Austria	27	5	11	-	-	11	-	-	-	-	-
	Alex Giorgi	Italy	27	-	-	1	10	-	-	-	10	6	-
	Peter Müller	Switzerland	27	25	-	-	-	-	-	-	-	-	2
18	Michael Mair	Italy	25	-	25	-	-	-	-	-	-	-	-

=== Slalom ===
see complete table

In Men's Slalom World Cup 1982/83 the best 5 results count. 13 racers had a point deduction, which are given in (). Ingemar Stenmark and his childhood friend Stig Strand tied for the overall title, but Stenmark won under the FIS newly revised tiebreaker format of most race victories (3 to 2). He thus won his eighth Slalom World Cup.

Place	Name	Country	Total	3	7	10	16	20	22	25	27	29	31	37
1	Ingemar Stenmark	Sweden	110	25	20	-	25	-	-	25	(10)	-	15	-
2	Stig Strand	Sweden	110	20	25	-	(9)	20	-	(3)	(12)	20	(20)	25
3	Andreas Wenzel	Liechtenstein	92	-	-	15	-	-	20	12	(9)	25	-	20
4	Steve Mahre	United States	80	12	8	25	10	-	25	(5)	-	-	-	-
5	Bojan Križaj	Yugoslavia	78	11	12	-	-	-	-	(6)	25	15	(11)	15
6	Phil Mahre	United States	75	15	15	-	15	-	15	15	(11)	-	(12)	(10)
7	Marc Girardelli	Luxembourg	69	(6)	-	-	12	-	9	11	-	12	25	-
8	Paolo De Chiesa	Italy	67	(9)	11	12	(11)	12	-	20	-	(8)	(10)	12
9	Franz Gruber	Austria	66	-	9	11	-	25	(6)	(9)	-	10	(7)	11
10	Christian Orlainsky	Austria	62	10	10	-	20	-	-	-	15	-	-	7

=== Combined ===
see complete table

In Men's Combined World Cup 1982/83 all 5 results count. Phil Mahre won his fourth Combined World Cup in a row.

Place	Name	Country	Total	5	9	17	23	26
1	Phil Mahre	United States	75	-	-	25	25	25
2	Peter Lüscher	Switzerland	52	15	-	15	11	11
3	Marc Girardelli	Luxembourg	47	-	-	20	12	15
	Pirmin Zurbriggen	Switzerland	47	10	25	-	-	12
5	Andreas Wenzel	Liechtenstein	40	-	-	-	20	20
6	Silvano Meli	Switzerland	29	-	-	11	9	9
7	Peter Müller	Switzerland	27	20	-	7	-	-
	Urs Räber	Switzerland	27	11	-	9	-	7
9	Franz Heinzer	Switzerland	25	25	-	-	-	-
10	Bruno Kernen	Switzerland	22	-	-	12	-	10

== Women ==
=== Overall ===
see complete table

In Women's Overall World Cup 1982/83 the best four downhills, best four giant slaloms/Super G, best four slaloms and best three combined count. The parallel slalom only counts for the Nationscup (or was a show-event). 32 racers had a point deduction.

Place	Name	Country	Total	DH	GS SG	SL	KB
1	Tamara McKinney	United States	225	0	100	95	30
2	Hanni Wenzel	Liechtenstein	193	0	71	70	52
3	Erika Hess	Switzerland	192	0	67	90	35
4	Elisabeth Kirchler	Austria	163	75	41	0	47
5	Maria Walliser	Switzerland	135	85	39	0	11
6	Irene Epple	West Germany	117	24	59	2	32
7	Cindy Nelson	United States	115	13	72	1	29
8	Olga Charvátová	Czechoslovakia	111	20	29	31	31
9	Maria Epple	West Germany	109	0	71	38	0
10	Doris de Agostini	Switzerland	96	95	0	0	1
11	Anni Kronbichler	Austria	93	0	22	59	12
12	Christin Cooper	United States	87	0	32	27	28
13	Fabienne Serrat	France	86	0	58	13	15
14	Maria Rosa Quario	Italy	82	0	0	82	0
15	Michaela Gerg	West Germany	70	26	21	3	20
16	Perrine Pelen	France	69	0	24	45	0
17	Élisabeth Chaud	France	67	47	20	0	0
18	Laurie Graham	Canada	66	57	0	0	9
19	Petra Wenzel	Liechtenstein	65	0	24	41	0
20	Anne Flore Rey	France	63	0	57	6	0

=== Downhill ===
see complete table

In Women's Downhill World Cup 1982/83 the best 5 results count. Four racers had a point deduction, which are given in ().

Place	Name	Country	Total	1	5	11	13	15	17	20	23
1	Doris de Agostini	Switzerland	106	25	(1)	25	(10)	20	25	(6)	11
2	Maria Walliser	Switzerland	97	15	-	(8)	25	(6)	12	25	20
3	Elisabeth Kirchler	Austria	76	10	-	1	-	25	20	20	-
4	Caroline Attia	France	66	4	25	15	-	15	7	-	-
5	Laurie Graham	Canada	63	10	(5)	12	-	(4)	6	10	25
6	Élisabeth Chaud	France	50	11	-	20	3	(3)	5	11	-
7	Jana Gantnerová	Czechoslovakia	47	-	10	9	11	10	-	7	-
8	Claudine Emonet	France	44	-	20	-	-	11	-	8	5
9	Lea Sölkner	Austria	40	20	-	-	2	9	4	5	-
10	Ariane Ehrat	Switzerland	39	-	8	5	2	9	-	15	-

=== Giant Slalom / Super G ===
see complete table

In Women's Giant Slalom and Super G World Cup 1982/83 the best 5 results count. Ten racers had a point deduction, which are given in (). Super G-races were held for the first time. Irene Epple won the first ever World Cup Super G. Tamara McKinney won the cup with all of her counted results collected in Giant Slaloms.

Place	Name	Country	Total	2	8SG	9SG	16	24	26	27	28	29
1	Tamara McKinney	United States	120	20	(15)	(12)	25	-	25	25	25	(4)
2	Cindy Nelson	United States	83	-	12	25	(6)	(5)	11	15	20	(10)
3	Maria Epple	West Germany	81	(8)	10	(10)	(7)	20	20	20	11	(8)
4	Erika Hess	Switzerland	78	25	-	-	(10)	15	12	11	15	(6)
5	Hanni Wenzel	Liechtenstein	77	15	20	11	(5)	-	6	-	(3)	25
6	Fabienne Serrat	France	68	10	11	(8)	12	(2)	15	-	-	20
7	Irene Epple	West Germany	65	-	25	15	11	-	8	6	(6)	(2)
8	Anne Flore Rey	France	64	(6)	7	(1)	9	25	-	11	12	-
9	Elisabeth Kirchler	Austria	46	12	5	-	-	7	(5)	(5)	10	12
10	Maria Walliser	Switzerland	40	-	-	6	-	9	1	9	-	15

=== Slalom ===
see complete table

In Women's Slalom World Cup 1982/83 the best 5 results count. Ten racers had a point deduction, which are given in ().

Place	Name	Country	Total	4	6	10	12	18	21	22	25	30
1	Erika Hess	Switzerland	110	20	25	20	-	-	25	20	-	(20)
2	Tamara McKinney	United States	105	25	-	25	-	10	-	-	20	25
3	Maria Rosa Quario	Italy	89	12	7	(5)	20	25	-	25	(2)	-
4	Hanni Wenzel	Liechtenstein	82	15	12	(11)	-	20	20	-	15	(12)
5	Roswitha Steiner	Austria	70	-	-	10	11	12	-	12	25	(10)
6	Anni Kronbichler	Austria	66	7	(6)	(3)	25	9	15	-	10	(6)
7	Małgorzata Tlałka	Poland	65	-	-	-	20	4	-	15	11	15
8	Dorota Tlałka	Poland	54	(1)	8	-	12	15	10	(8)	(6)	9
9	Daniela Zini	Italy	46	11	-	-	-	7	11	10	7	(7)
	Petra Wenzel	Liechtenstein	46	-	-	9	(3)	11	12	9	5	-

=== Combined ===
see complete table

In Women's Combined World Cup 1982/83 all 4 results count. All four events saw a different winner from a different country.

Place	Name	Country	Total	3	7	14	19
1	Hanni Wenzel	Liechtenstein	52	12	15	-	25
2	Elisabeth Kirchler	Austria	47	25	7	-	15
3	Irene Epple	West Germany	40	10	8	11	11
4	Erika Hess	Switzerland	35	15	20	-	-
5	Olga Charvátová	Czechoslovakia	31	6	-	25	-
6	Tamara McKinney	United States	30	20	-	-	10
7	Cindy Nelson	United States	29	7	-	10	12
	Sylvia Eder	Austria	29	-	-	20	9
9	Christin Cooper	United States	28	3	25	-	-
10	Heidi Wiesler	West Germany	26	4	11	7	4

== Nations Cup ==
=== Overall ===
Place	Country	Total	Men	Ladies
1	Switzerland	2136	1355	781
2	Austria	1683	1065	618
3	United States	1077	464	613
4	France	707	126	581
5	Italy	651	411	240
6	Liechtenstein	581	222	359
7	Sweden	520	520	0
8	West Germany	507	58	449
9	Canada	371	238	133
10	Yugoslavia	314	295	19
11	Czechoslovakia	208	8	200
12	Luxembourg	174	174	0
13	Poland	147	0	147
14	Bulgaria	37	37	0
15	Soviet Union	28	28	0
16	Norway	24	24	0
17	Australia	22	22	0
18	Spain	15	0	15
19	Hungary	11	11	0
20	Japan	10	10	0
21	United Kingdom	7	7	0
22	Denmark	6	6	0
	Mexico	6	6	0

=== Men ===
All points were shown including individual deduction.

Place	Country	Total	DH	GS SG	SL	KB	Racers	Wins
1	Switzerland	1355	566	445	84	260	16	9
2	Austria	1065	572	231	185	77	20	7
3	Sweden	520	0	151	361	8	8	7
4	United States	464	42	136	193	93	6	8
5	Italy	411	64	137	185	25	11	1
6	Yugoslavia	295	0	157	126	12	6	1
7	Canada	238	231	0	0	7	4	2
8	Liechtenstein	222	7	40	135	40	2	1
9	Luxembourg	174	0	52	75	47	1	1
10	France	126	1	11	97	17	9	0
11	West Germany	58	15	21	18	4	6	0
12	Bulgaria	37	0	0	37	0	1	0
13	Soviet Union	28	19	0	3	6	2	0
14	Norway	24	0	11	13	0	2	0
15	Australia	22	6	0	0	16	1	0
16	Hungary	11	0	0	0	11	2	0
17	Japan	10	0	0	10	0	4	0
18	Czechoslovakia	8	0	0	0	8	1	0
19	United Kingdom	7	0	0	0	7	1	0
20	Denmark	6	0	0	0	6	1	0
	Mexico	6	0	0	0	6	1	0

=== Women ===
All points were shown including individual deduction.

Place	Country	Total	DH	GS SG	SL	KB	Racers	Wins
1	Switzerland	781	301	215	164	101	10	8
2	Austria	618	233	93	186	106	15	3
3	United States	613	75	300	136	102	9	10
4	France	581	243	245	73	20	12	2
5	West Germany	449	70	213	66	100	9	1
6	Liechtenstein	359	0	122	185	52	3	2
7	Italy	240	0	13	227	0	6	2
8	Czechoslovakia	200	67	35	44	54	5	1
9	Poland	147	0	0	142	5	3	0
10	Canada	133	124	0	0	9	5	1
11	Yugoslavia	19	0	0	19	0	2	0
12	Spain	15	0	9	6	0	1	0
