= 1983 Alpine Skiing World Cup – Women's downhill =

1983 Women's downhill World Cup
Previous: 1982	Next: 1984

Women's downhill World Cup 1982/1983

== Calendar ==
Round	Race No	Place	Country	Date	Winner	Second	Third
1	1	Val d'Isère	France	December 7, 1982	(Switzerland) Doris de Agostini	(Austria) Lea Sölkner	(Switzerland) Maria Walliser
2	5	San Sicario	Italy	December 15, 1982	(France) Caroline Attia	(France) Claudine Emonet	(West Germany) Heidi Wiesler
3	11	Schruns	Austria	January 14, 1983	(Switzerland) Doris de Agostini	(France) Élisabeth Chaud	(France) Caroline Attia
4	13	Megève	France	January 21, 1983	(Switzerland) Maria Walliser	(United States) Maria Maricich	(France) Marie-Luce Waldmeier
5	15	Megève	France	January 22, 1983	(Austria) Elisabeth Kirchler	(Switzerland) Doris de Agostini	(France) Caroline Attia
6	17	Les Diablerets	Switzerland	January 29, 1983	(Switzerland) Doris de Agostini	(Austria) Elisabeth Kirchler	(Austria) Veronika Vitzthum
7	20	Sarajevo	Yugoslavia	February 5, 1983	(Switzerland) Maria Walliser	(Austria) Elisabeth Kirchler	(Switzerland) Ariane Ehrat
8	23	Mont Tremblant	Canada	March 5, 1983	(Canada) Laurie Graham	(Switzerland) Maria Walliser	(Switzerland) Michela Figini

== Final point standings ==
In women's downhill World Cup 1982/83 the best 5 results count. Deductions are given in ().

Place	Name	Country	Total points	Deduction	1 (France)	5 (Italy)	11 (Austria)	13 (France)	15 (France)	17 (Switzerland)	20 (Socialist Federal Republic of Yugoslavia)	23 (Canada)
1	Doris de Agostini	Switzerland	106	(17)	25	(1)	25	(10)	20	25	(6)	11
2	Maria Walliser	Switzerland	97	(14)	15	-	(8)	25	(6)	12	25	20
3	Elisabeth Kirchler	Austria	76		10	-	1	-	25	20	20	-
4	Caroline Attia	France	66		4	25	15	-	15	7	-	-
5	Laurie Graham	Canada	63	(9)	10	(5)	12	-	(4)	6	10	25
6	Élisabeth Chaud	France	50	(3)	11	-	20	3	(3)	5	11	-
7	Jana Gantnerová	Czechoslovakia	47		-	10	9	11	10	-	7	-
8	Claudine Emonet	France	44		-	20	-	-	11	-	8	5
9	Lea Sölkner	Austria	40		20	-	-	2	9	4	5	-
10	Ariane Ehrat	Switzerland	39		-	8	5	2	9	-	15	-
11	Gerry Sorensen	Canada	36		12	-	11	9	-	2	2	-
	Veronika Vitzthum	Austria	36		-	2	6	5	-	15	-	8
13	Marie-Luce Waldmeier	France	34		8	4	7	15	-	-	-	-
14	Catherine Quittet	France	29		-	12	-	-	5	-	-	12
15	Siglinde Winkler	Austria	27		-	6	-	-	12	9	-	-
16	Michaela Gerg	West Germany	26		-	-	4	12	9	1	-	-
	Sylvia Eder	Austria	26		8	-	-	8	1	8	-	1
18	Irene Epple	West Germany	24		6	4	10	4	-	-	-	-
19	Debbie Armstrong	United States	22		-	9	-	-	-	11	-	2
20	Maria Maricich	United States	20		-	-	-	20	-	-	-	-
	Olga Charvátová	Czechoslovakia	20		-	-	-	-	-	-	12	8
22	Heidi Wiesler	West Germany	17		-	15	2	-	-	-	-	-
23	Sigrid Wolf	Austria	16		-	-	-	-	-	10	-	6
24	Michela Figini	Switzerland	15		-	-	-	-	-	-	-	15
25	Cindy Nelson	United States	13		1	-	-	-	-	3	9	-
26	Françoise Bozon	France	11		-	11	-	-	-	-	-	-
	Holly Flanders	United States	11		-	-	-	8	-	-	3	-
	Brigitte Oertli	Switzerland	11		-	7	-	-	-	-	-	4
29	Karen Stemmle	Canada	10		-	-	-	-	-	-	-	10
30	Pam Fletcher	United States	9		-	-	-	-	-	-	-	9
31	Carole Merle	France	6		-	-	-	6	-	-	-	-
32	Huberta Wolf	Austria	5		5	-	-	-	-	-	-	-
33	Elisabeth Warter	Austria	4		-	-	-	-	-	-	4	-
34	Diane Haight	Canada	3		3	-	-	-	-	-	-	-
	Katrin Gutensohn	Austria	3		-	-	3	-	-	-	-	-
	Liisa Savijarvi	Canada	3		-	-	-	-	-	-	-	3
37	Zoe Haas	Switzerland	2		2	-	-	-	-	-	-	-
	Sonja Stotz	West Germany	2		-	-	-	-	2	-	-	-
39	Regine Mösenlechner	West Germany	1		-	-	-	-	-	-	1	-

Alpine skiing World Cup
Women

Overall | Downhill | Giant/Super G | Slalom | Combined

1983
