= 1983 Alpine Skiing World Cup – Men's giant slalom and super-G =

1983 Men's giant slalom and Super G World Cup
Previous: 1982	Next: 1984

Men's giant slalom and Super G World Cup 1982/1983

== Calendar ==
Round	Race No	Discipline	Place	Country	Date	Winner	Second	Third
1	2	Super G	Val d'Isère	France	December 12, 1982	(Switzerland) Peter Müller	(Switzerland) Peter Lüscher	(Switzerland) Pirmin Zurbriggen
2	8	Super G	Madonna di Campiglio	Italy	December 22, 1982	(Italy) Michael Mair	(Austria) Hans Enn	(Switzerland) Pirmin Zurbriggen
3	13	Giant	Adelboden	Switzerland	January 11, 1983	(Switzerland) Pirmin Zurbriggen	(Switzerland) Max Julen	(Switzerland) Jacques Lüthy
4	19	Giant	Kranjska Gora	Yugoslavia	January 29, 1983	(Austria) Hans Enn	(Switzerland) Max Julen	(Sweden) Ingemar Stenmark
5	24	Super G	Garmisch-Partenkirchen	West Germany	February 9, 1983	(Switzerland) Peter Lüscher	(Switzerland) Pirmin Zurbriggen	(Austria) Hans Enn
6	28	Giant	Todtnau	West Germany	February 13, 1983	(Sweden) Ingemar Stenmark	(Switzerland) Max Julen	(Switzerland) Pirmin Zurbriggen
7	30	Giant	Gällivare	Sweden	February 26, 1983	(Sweden) Ingemar Stenmark	(United States) Phil Mahre (Switzerland) Max Julen
8	33	Giant	Aspen	United States	March 7, 1983	(United States) Phil Mahre	(Luxembourg) Marc Girardelli	(Sweden) Ingemar Stenmark
9	34	Giant	Vail	United States	March 8, 1983	(United States) Phil Mahre	(Sweden) Ingemar Stenmark	(Switzerland) Max Julen
10	36	Giant	Furano	Japan	March 19, 1983	(United States) Phil Mahre	(Switzerland) Max Julen	(Sweden) Ingemar Stenmark

== Final point standings ==
In men's giant slalom and Super G World Cup 1982/83 the best 5 results count. Deductions are given in ().

Place	Name	Country	Total points	Deduction	2 (France) SG	8 (Italy) SG	13 (Switzerland)	19 (Socialist Federal Republic of Yugoslavia)	24 (Germany) SG	28 (Germany)	30 (Sweden)	33 (United States)	34 (United States)	36 (Japan)
1	Phil Mahre	United States	107	(16)	-	-	(5)	(11)	-	12	20	25	25	25
2	Ingemar Stenmark	Sweden	100	(29)	-	-	(9)	15	(5)	25	25	15	20	(15)
	Max Julen	Switzerland	100	(30)	-	-	20	20	(3)	20	20	(12)	(15)	20
4	Pirmin Zurbriggen	Switzerland	90	(30)	15	15	25	(4)	20	15	(7)	(8)	-	(11)
5	Hans Enn	Austria	83	(21)	(10)	20	(4)	25	15	-	-	(7)	11	12
6	Marc Girardelli	Luxembourg	52		-	-	9	6	7	10	-	20	-	-
7	Peter Lüscher	Switzerland	51		20	2	-	-	25	-	-	-	-	4
8	Jure Franko	Yugoslavia	50	(16)	9	10	11	(7)	(8)	-	9	11	-	(1)
	Robert Erlacher	Italy	50	(15)	(4)	(5)	-	12	(6)	8	-	9	12	9
10	Jacques Lüthy	Switzerland	44		-	-	15	9	9	-	10	1	-	-
11	Boris Strel	Yugoslavia	43	(5)	-	-	-	5	(5)	10	11	-	7	10
12	Andreas Wenzel	Liechtenstein	38	(2)	2	(1)	10	(1)	12	11	-	3	-	-
13	Thomas Bürgler	Switzerland	36		11	-	7	8	-	1	-	-	9	-
14	Franz Gruber	Austria	31		-	3	-	-	-	5	8	-	10	5
15	Hubert Strolz	Austria	27		5	11	-	-	11	-	-	-	-	-
	Alex Giorgi	Italy	27		-	-	1	10	-	-	-	10	6	-
	Peter Müller	Switzerland	27		25	-	-	-	-	-	-	-	-	2
18	Michael Mair	Italy	25		-	25	-	-	-	-	-	-	-	-
19	Franz Heinzer	Switzerland	24		12	12	-	-	-	-	-	-	-	-
20	Bojan Križaj	Yugoslavia	22		7	-	12	3	-	-	-	-	-	-
21	Grega Benedik	Yugoslavia	21		-	7	1	-	1	-	6	-	-	6
22	Siegfried Kerschbaumer	Italy	19		3	6	-	-	10	-	-	-	-	-
23	Christian Orlainsky	Austria	17		6	-	-	2	2	4	-	-	-	3
24	Harti Weirather	Austria	16		8	8	-	-	-	-	-	-	-	-
25	Günther Mader	Austria	15		-	9	-	-	-	-	-	6	-	-
26	Leonhard Stock	Austria	14		-	4	-	-	-	-	-	-	3	7
27	Steve Mahre	United States	13		-	-	-	-	-	-	-	5	8	-
28	Johan Wallner	Sweden	12		-	-	-	-	-	-	12	-	-	-
29	Egon Hirt	West Germany	11		-	-	-	-	-	7	-	4	-	-
	Odd Sørli	Norway	11		-	-	-	-	-	-	4	2	5	-
31	Patrick Lamotte	France	10		-	-	-	-	-	6	-	-	4	-
	Frank Wörndl	West Germany	10		-	-	-	-	-	2	-	-	-	8
33	Hans Pieren	Switzerland	8		-	-	6	-	-	-	2	-	-	-
34	Jörgen Sundqvist	Sweden	5		-	-	-	-	-	-	5	-	-	-
	Hannes Spiss	Austria	5		-	-	2	-	-	-	3	-	-	-
	Torsten Jakobsson	Sweden	5		-	-	3	-	-	-	2	-	-	-
37	Joël Gaspoz	Switzerland	3		-	-	-	-	-	3	-	-	-	-
38	Martin Hangl	Switzerland	2		2	-	-	-	-	-	-	-	-	-
	Guido Hinterseer	Austria	2		-	-	-	-	-	-	-	-	2	-
40	Ivano Camozzi	Italy	1		-	-	1	-	-	-	-	-	-	-
	Yves Tavernier	France	1		-	-	-	-	-	-	-	-	1	-

== Men's giant slalom and Super G team results ==
All points were shown including individual deduction. bold indicate highest score - italics indicate race wins

Place	Country	Total points	2 (France) SG	8 (Italy) SG	13 (Switzerland)	19 (Socialist Federal Republic of Yugoslavia)	24 (Germany) SG	28 (Germany)	30 (Sweden)	33 (United States)	34 (United States)	36 (Japan)	Racers	Wins
1	Switzerland	445	**85**	29	73	41	57	39	39	21	24	37	10	3
2	Austria	231	29	55	6	27	28	9	11	13	26	27	9	1
3	Yugoslavia	157	16	17	24	15	14	10	26	11	7	17	4	0
4	Sweden	151	-	-	12	15	5	25	44	15	20	15	4	2
5	Italy	137	7	36	2	22	16	8	-	19	18	9	5	1
6	United States	136	-	-	5	11	-	12	20	30	33	25	2	3
7	Luxembourg	52	-	-	9	6	7	10	-	20	-	-	1	0
8	Liechtenstein	40	2	1	10	1	12	11	-	3	-	-	1	0
9	West Germany	21	-	-	-	-	-	9	-	4	-	8	2	0
10	France	11	-	-	-	-	-	6	-	-	5	-	2	0
	Norway	11	-	-	-	-	-	-	4	2	5	-	1	0

**Alpine Skiing World Cup**
**Men**

Overall | Downhill | Giant/Super G | Slalom | Combined

**1983**
