= 1983 Alpine Skiing World Cup – Women's giant slalom and super-G =

1983 Giant slalom and super-G World Cup
Previous: 1982	Next: 1984

Women's giant slalom and super-G World Cup 1982/1983

== Calendar ==
Round	Race No	Discipline	Place	Country	Date	Winner	Second	Third
1	2	Giant	Val d'Isère	France	December 8, 1982	(Switzerland) Erika Hess	(United States) Tamara McKinney	(Liechtenstein) Hanni Wenzel
2	8	Super-G	Verbier	Switzerland	January 9, 1983	(West Germany) Irene Epple	(Liechtenstein) Hanni Wenzel	(United States) Tamara McKinney
3	9	Super-G	Verbier	Switzerland	January 10, 1983	(United States) Cindy Nelson	(Switzerland) Zoe Haas	(West Germany) Irene Epple
4	16	Giant	St. Gervais	France	January 23, 1983	(United States) Tamara McKinney	(United States) Christin Cooper	(France) Carole Merle
5	24	Giant	Mont Tremblant	Canada	March 6, 1983	(France) Anne Flore Rey	(West Germany) Maria Epple	(Switzerland) Erika Hess
6	26	Giant	Waterville Valley	United States	March 9, 1983	(United States) Tamara McKinney	(West Germany) Maria Epple	(France) Fabienne Serrat
7	27	Giant	Waterville Valley	United States	March 10, 1983	(United States) Tamara McKinney	(West Germany) Maria Epple	(United States) Cindy Nelson
8	28	Giant	Vail	United States	March 12, 1983	(United States) Tamara McKinney	(United States) Cindy Nelson	(Switzerland) Erika Hess
9	29	Giant	Furano	Japan	March 18, 1983	(Liechtenstein) Hanni Wenzel	(France) Fabienne Serrat	(Switzerland) Maria Walliser

== Final point standings ==
In women's giant slalom and super-G World Cup 1982/83 the best 5 results count. Deductions are given in ().

Place	Name	Country	Total points	Deduction	2 (France)	8 (Switzerland) SG	9 (Switzerland) SG	16 (France)	24 (Canada)	26 (United States)	27 (United States)	28 (United States)	29 (Japan)
1	Tamara McKinney	United States	120	(31)	20	(15)	(12)	25	-	25	25	25	(4)
2	Cindy Nelson	United States	83	(21)	-	12	25	(6)	(5)	11	15	20	(10)
3	Maria Epple	West Germany	81	(33)	(8)	10	(10)	(7)	20	20	20	11	(8)
4	Erika Hess	Switzerland	78	(16)	25	-	-	(10)	15	12	11	15	(6)
5	Hanni Wenzel	Liechtenstein	77	(8)	15	20	11	(5)	-	6	-	(3)	25
6	Fabienne Serrat	France	68	(10)	10	11	(8)	12	(2)	15	-	-	20
7	Irene Epple	West Germany	65	(8)	-	25	15	11	-	8	6	(6)	(2)
8	Anne Flore Rey	France	64	(7)	(6)	7	(1)	9	25	-	11	12	-
9	Elisabeth Kirchler	Austria	46	(10)	12	5	-	-	7	(5)	(5)	10	12
10	Maria Walliser	Switzerland	40		-	-	6	-	9	1	9	-	15
11	Zoe Haas	Switzerland	38		-	4	20	8	-	-	3	-	3
12	Christin Cooper	United States	32		7	-	5	20	-	-	-	-	-
13	Olga Charvátová	Czechoslovakia	30		-	-	-	-	10	3	1	7	9
14	Carole Merle	France	29		-	-	-	15	3	-	-	-	11
15	Michela Figini	Switzerland	25		-	-	-	-	4	-	12	9	-
16	Petra Wenzel	Liechtenstein	24		-	-	-	-	11	4	4	5	-
	Perrine Pelen	France	24		3	6	-	-	-	-	-	8	7
18	Michaela Gerg	West Germany	23	(1)	-	(1)	-	2	-	7	7	2	5
19	Anni Kronbichler	Austria	22		-	2	7	-	12	-	-	-	-
20	Hélène Barbier	France	20		11	9	-	-	-	-	-	-	-
	Élisabeth Chaud	France	20		-	8	9	1	-	2	-	-	-
22	Monika Hess	Switzerland	18		-	-	-	-	-	10	8	-	-
23	Claudia Riedl	Austria	15		-	-	-	-	6	9	-	-	-
24	Ursula Konzett	Liechtenstein	13		9	4	-	-	-	-	-	-	-
25	Daniela Zini	Italy	12		5	-	2	4	-	-	-	1	-
26	Blanca Fernández Ochoa	Spain	9		1	-	-	-	8	-	-	-	-
	Debbie Armstrong	United States	9		2	-	3	-	-	-	-	4	-
28	Elena Medzihradská	Czechoslovakia	5		5	-	-	-	-	-	-	-	-
29	Catherine Quittet	France	4		-	-	4	-	-	-	-	-	-
	Heidi Preuss	United States	4		-	1	-	3	-	-	-	-	-
31	Heidi Wiesler	West Germany	2		-	-	-	-	-	-	2	-	-
32	Fulvia Stevenin	Italy	1		-	-	-	-	1	-	-	-	-

Alpine Skiing World Cup
Women

Overall | Downhill | Giant/Super-G | Slalom | Combined

1983
