= 1983 Alpine Skiing World Cup – Men's overall =

1983 men's overall World Cup
Previous: 1982	Next: 1984

Men's overall World Cup 1982/1983

== Final point standings ==
In men's overall World Cup 1982/83 the best five downhills, best five giant slaloms/Super G, best five slaloms and best three combined count. The parallel slalom only counts for the Nationscup (or was a show-event). Deductions are given in ().

Place	Name	Country	Total points	Total deduction	Downhill		Giant/ Super G		Slalom		Combined
1	Phil Mahre	United States	285	(51)	28	(2)	107	(16)	75	(33)	75
2	Ingemar Stenmark	Sweden	218	(39)	0		100	(29)	110	(10)	8
3	Andreas Wenzel	Liechtenstein	177	(11)	7		38	(2)	92	(9)	40
4	Marc Girardelli	Luxembourg	168	(6)	0		52		69	(6)	47
5	Peter Lüscher	Switzerland	164	(11)	72		51		0		41	(11)
6	Pirmin Zurbriggen	Switzerland	161	(30)	11		90	(30)	13		47
7	Peter Müller	Switzerland	125	(22)	71	(22)	27		0		27
8	Max Julen	Switzerland	116	(30)	0		100	(30)	13		3
9	Bojan Križaj	Yugoslavia	112	(17)	0		22		78	(17)	12
	Franz Gruber	Austria	112	(22)	0		31		66	(22)	15
11	Stig Strand	Sweden	110	(44)	0		0		110	(44)	0
12	Steve Mahre	United States	108	(5)	0		13		80	(5)	15
13	Harti Weirather	Austria	102	(35)	74	(35)	16		0		12
14	Conradin Cathomen	Switzerland	100	(16)	92	(16)	0		0		8
15	Urs Räber	Switzerland	99	(38)	72	(38)	0		0		27
	Christian Orlainsky	Austria	99		0		17		62		20
17	Jacques Lüthy	Switzerland	96	(2)	0		44		42	(2)	10
18	Franz Klammer	Austria	95	(36)	95	(36)	0		0		0
19	Silvano Meli	Switzerland	85	(15)	56	(15)	0		0		29
20	Hans Enn	Austria	84	(21)	0		83	(21)	0		1
21	Michael Mair	Italy	78		48		25		0		5
22	Bruno Kernen	Switzerland	77	(8)	55	(8)	0		0		22
23	Ken Read	Canada	76	(27)	69	(27)	0		0		7
24	Helmut Höflehner	Austria	74	(17)	65	(17)	0		0		9
25	Erwin Resch	Austria	73	(5)	73	(5)	0		0		0
26	Franz Heinzer	Switzerland	72		36		34		0		25
27	Todd Brooker	Canada	67	(1)	67	(1)	0		0		0
	Paolo De Chiesa	Italy	67	(38)	0		0		67	(38)	0
29	Robert Erlacher	Italy	65	(15)	0		50	(15)	6		9
30	Steve Podborski	Canada	63		63		0		0		0
31	Michel Canac	France	59	(10)	0		0		52	(10)	7
32	Jure Franko	Yugoslavia	56	(16)	0		50	(16)	6		0
33	Leonhard Stock	Austria	55	(8)	41	(8)	14		0		0
34	Bengt Fjällberg	Sweden	49	(1)	0		0		49	(1)	0
35	Alex Giorgi	Italy	47		0		27		20		0
36	Boris Strel	Yugoslavia	43	(5)	0		43	(5)	0		0
37	Gerhard Pfaffenbichler	Austria	40		40		0		0		0
38	Ivano Edalini	Italy	39		0		0		34		5
39	Hubert Strolz	Austria	38		0		27		0		11
40	Thomas Bürgler	Switzerland	36		0		36		0		0
41	Paul Frommelt	Liechtenstein	34		0		0		34		0
42	Petar Popangelov	Bulgaria	33	(4)	0		0		33	(4)	0
43	Peter Wirnsberger	Austria	32		32		0		0		0
44	Lars-Göran Halvarsson	Sweden	27		0		0		27		0
45	Frank Wörndl	West Germany	26		0		10		12		4
46	Vladimir Makeev	Soviet Union	23		19		0		0		4
	Klaus Heidegger	Austria	23		0		0		23		0
48	Danilo Sbardellotto	Italy	22		16		0		0		6
	Steven Lee	Australia	22		6		0		0		16
	Jože Kuralt	Yugoslavia	22		0		0		22		0
51	Grega Benedik	Yugoslavia	21		0		21		0		0
52	Siegfried Kerschbaumer	Italy	19		0		19		0		0
53	Hans Pieren	Switzerland	18		0		8		10		0
54	Fritz Stölzl	Austria	16		16		0		0		0
	Odd Sørli	Norway	16		0		11		5		0
56	Toni Bürgler	Switzerland	15		15		0		0		0
	Hannes Spiss	Austria	15		0		5		4		0
	Günther Mader	Austria	15		0		15		0		0
59	Jörgen Sundqvist	Sweden	13		0		5		8		0
	Stefan Niederseer	Austria	13		13		0		0		0
61	Bernhard Flaschberger	Austria	12		12		0		0		0
	Johan Wallner	Sweden	12		0		12		0		0
63	Peter Mally	Italy	11		0		0		11		0
	Egon Hirt	West Germany	11		0		11		0		0
65	Ulrich Spieß	Austria	10		10		0		0		0
	Bernhard Fahner	Switzerland	10		0		0		0		10
	Bill Johnson	United States	10		10		0		0		0
	Gérard Ramboud	France	10		0		0		0		10
	Michel Vion	France	10		0		0		10		0
	Patrick Lamotte	France	10		0		10		0		0
71	Didier Bouvet	France	9		0		0		9		0
	Daniel Fontaine	France	9		0		0		9		0
	Sepp Wildgruber	West Germany	9		9		0		0		0
74	Peter Šoltys	Czechoslovakia	8		0		0		0		8
	Helmut Gstrein	Austria	8		0		0		8		0
	Paul Arne Skajem	Norway	8		0		0		8		0
77	Marco Tonazzi	Italy	7		0		0		7		0
	Martin Bell	United Kingdom	7		0		0		0		7
	Joël Gaspoz	Switzerland	7		0		3		4		0
80	Daniel Mougel	France	6		0		0		6		0
	Antal Gótzy	Hungary	6		0		0		0		6
	Florian Beck	West Germany	6		0		0		6		0
	Mats Bødker	Denmark	6		0		0		0		6
	Hubertus von Hohenlohe	Mexico	6		0		0		0		6
85	Vladimir Andreev	Soviet Union	5		0		0		3		2
	Peter Dürr	West Germany	5		5		0		0		0
	András Völgyesi	Hungary	5		0		0		0		5
	Torsten Jakobsson	Sweden	5		0		5		0		0
	Guido Hinterseer	Austria	5		0		2		0		3
90	Rob McLeish	Canada	4		4		0		0		0
	Naomine Iwaya	Japan	4		0		0		4		0
92	Tomaž Cerkovnik	Yugoslavia	3		0		0		3		0
	Hiroaki Ohtaka	Japan	3		0		0		3		0
94	Martin Hangl	Switzerland	2		0		2		0		0
	Tris Cochrane	United States	2		0		0		0		2
	Toshihiro Kaiwa	Japan	2		0		0		2		0
	Oswald Tötsch	Italy	2		0		0		2		0
	Joakim Wallner	Sweden	2		0		0		2		0
	Mike Brown	United States	2		2		0		0		0
	Yves Tavernier	France	2		0		1		1		0
101	Klaus Gattermann	West Germany	1		1		0		0		0
	Andy Luhn	United States	1		0		0		0		1
	Ivano Camozzi	Italy	1		0		1		0		0
	Philippe Verneret	France	1		1		0		0		0
	Wataru Mizutani	Japan	1		0		0		1		0

Alpine skiing World Cup
Men

Overall | Downhill | Giant/Super G | Slalom | Combined

1983
