= Alpine skiing at the 1984 Winter Olympics – Women's downhill =

Women's Downhill at the XIV Olympic Winter Games
- Alpine skiing
- Venue: Jahorina
- Date: February 16, 1984
- Competitors: 32 from 13 nations
- Winning time: 1:13.36

Medalists
1st place, gold medalist(s)		Michela Figini	Switzerland
2nd place, silver medalist(s)		Maria Walliser	Switzerland
3rd place, bronze medalist(s)		Olga Charvátová	Czechoslovakia

Women's Downhill
- Location: Jahorina
- Vertical: 547 m (1,795 ft)
- Top elevation: 1,872 m (6,142 ft)
- Base elevation: 1,325 m (4,347 ft)

The Women's Downhill competition of the Sarajevo 1984 Olympics was held at Jahorina on Thursday, February 16. It was the tenth edition of the event, which was established in 1948.

The defending world champion was Gerry Sorensen of Canada, while Switzerland's Doris De Agostini was the defending World Cup downhill champion and Switzerland's Maria Walliser led the current season. Defending Olympic champion Annemarie Moser-Pröll and De Agostini had both retired from competition.

The race was delayed five days, due to weather and scheduling conflicts. Switzerland's Michela Figini won the gold medal, followed by teammate Walliser, and Olga Charvátová of Czechoslovakia was the bronze medalist.

The course started at an elevation of 1,872 m (6,142 ft) above sea level with a vertical drop of 547 m (1,795 ft) and a length of 1.965 km (1.22 mi). Figini's winning time was 73.36 seconds, yielding an average speed of 96.429 km/h (59.9 mph), with an average vertical descent rate of 7.456 m/s (24.5 ft/s).

The men's downhill, delayed a full week, was run the same day at Bjelašnica, and started at noon.

== Results ==
The race was started at 10:30 local time, (UTC+1). At the starting gate, it was snowing lightly, the temperature was −14 °C (7 °F), and the snow condition was hard. The temperature at the finish was −13 °C (9 °F).

Rank	Bib	Name	Country	Time	Difference
1st place, gold medalist(s)	5	Michela Figini	Switzerland	1:13.36	—
2nd place, silver medalist(s)	10	Maria Walliser	Switzerland	1:13.41	+0.05
3rd place, bronze medalist(s)	16	Olga Charvátová	Czechoslovakia	1:13.53	+0.17
4	12	Ariane Ehrat	Switzerland	1:13.95	+0.59
5	15	Jana Šoltýsová	Czechoslovakia	1:14.14	+0.78
6	18	Marina Kiehl	West Germany	1:14.30	+0.94
6	11	Gerry Sorensen	Canada	1:14.30	+0.94
8	14	Lea Sölkner	Austria	1:14.39	+1.03
9	4	Elisabeth Kirchler	Austria	1:14.55	+1.19
10	22	Veronika Wallinger	Austria	1:14.76	+1.40
11	6	Laurie Graham	Canada	1:14.92	+1.56
12	19	Brigitte Oertli	Switzerland	1:14.93	+1.57
13	2	Sylvia Eder	Austria	1:14.97	+1.61
14	20	Heidi Wiesler	West Germany	1:14.98	+1.62
15	13	Caroline Attia	France	1:15.04	+1.68
16	7	Holly Flanders	United States	1:15.11	+1.75
17	23	Regine Mösenlechner	West Germany	1:15.16	+1.80
18	24	Liisa Savijarvi	Canada	1:15.32	+1.96
19	1	Maria Maricich	United States	1:15.55	+2.19
20	9	Marie-Luce Waldmeier	France	1:15.56	+2.20
21	21	Debbie Armstrong	United States	1:15.57	+2.21
22	17	Karen Stemmle	Canada	1:15.64	+2.28
23	8	Irene Epple	West Germany	1:15.65	+2.29
24	25	Ivana Valešová	Czechoslovakia	1:16.43	+3.07
25	28	Jolanda Kindle	Liechtenstein	1:16.89	+3.53
26	29	Christine Grant	New Zealand	1:17.52	+4.16
27	27	Michèle Brigitte Dombard	Belgium	1:18.92	+5.56
28	30	Marilla Guss	Australia	1:19.75	+6.39
29	31	Kate Rattray	New Zealand	1:20.18	+6.82
30	32	Teresa Bustamente	Argentina	1:21.62	+8.26
-	26	Clare Booth	Great Britain	DNF	-
-	3	Élisabeth Chaud	France	DNF	-
