= 1984 Alpine Skiing World Cup – Women's giant slalom and super-G =

1984 Giant slalom and super-G World Cup
Previous: 1983	Next: 1985

Women's giant slalom and super-G World Cup 1983/1984

== Calendar ==
Round	Race No	Discipline	Place	Country	Date	Winner	Second	Third
1	4	Giant	Val d'Isère	France	December 11, 1983	(Switzerland) Erika Hess	(France) Perrine Pelen	(Liechtenstein) Hanni Wenzel
2	10	Giant	Haus im Ennstal	Austria	December 22, 1983	(Liechtenstein) Hanni Wenzel	(West Germany) Maria Epple	(United States) Christin Cooper
3	12	Super-G	Puy St. Vincent	France	January 8, 1984	(Canada) Laurie Graham	(Switzerland) Michela Figini	(United States) Debbie Armstrong
4	23	Giant	St. Gervais	France	January 29, 1984	(Switzerland) Erika Hess	(United States) Christin Cooper	(France) Carole Merle
5	26	Super-G	Mont St. Anne, Quebec	Canada	March 4, 1984	(West Germany) Marina Kiehl	(Austria) Elisabeth Kirchler	(United States) Christin Cooper
6	27	Giant	Lake Placid	United States	March 7, 1984	(United States) Christin Cooper	(West Germany) Marina Kiehl	(West Germany) Maria Epple
7	29	Giant	Waterville Valley	United States	March 11, 1984	(United States) Tamara McKinney	(Switzerland) Erika Hess	(United States) Christin Cooper
8	30	Giant	Jasná	Czechoslovakia	March 17, 1984	(Switzerland) Erika Hess	(Switzerland) Michela Figini	(United States) Christin Cooper
9	33	Giant	Zwiesel	West Germany	March 21, 1984	(United States) Tamara McKinney	(Switzerland) Erika Hess	(Spain) Blanca Fernández Ochoa

== Final point standings ==
In women's giant slalom and super-G World Cup 1983/84 the best 5 results count. Nine racers had a point deduction, which are given in (). Erika Hess won the cup with all points collected in giant slaloms.

Place	Name	Country	Total points	Deduction	4 (France)	10 (Austria)	12 (France) SG	23 (France)	26 (Canada) SG	27 (United States)	29 (United States)	30 (Czechoslovakia)	33 (Germany)
1	Erika Hess	Switzerland	115	(22)	25	(12)	-	25	-	(10)	20	25	20
2	Christin Cooper	United States	90	(17)	-	15	(2)	20	15	25	15	(15)	-
3	Tamara McKinney	United States	85	(27)	12	(10)	-	(7)	(10)	12	25	11	25
4	Marina Kiehl	West Germany	77	(6)	(6)	-	10	-	25	20	-	10	12
5	Hanni Wenzel	Liechtenstein	69	(12)	15	25	9	-	9	11	-	(4)	(8)
6	Michela Figini	Switzerland	64	(2)	8	7	20	(2)	-	-	-	20	9
7	Elisabeth Kirchler	Austria	55	(9)	7	(5)	-	9	20	(4)	12	-	7
8	Maria Epple	West Germany	53		-	20	-	-	-	15	6	12	-
9	Perrine Pelen	France	51	(1)	20	9	-	10	-	4	8	(1)	-
10	Carole Merle	France	37		11	-	-	15	-	-	11	-	-
11	Olga Charvátová	Czechoslovakia	34	(1)	9	8	8	-	-	2	-	7	(1)
12	Irene Epple	West Germany	33		10	11	12	-	-	-	-	-	-
	Debbie Armstrong	United States	33		-	-	15	11	-	-	-	-	7
14	Laurie Graham	Canada	32		-	-	25	-	7	-	-	-	-
15	Cindy Nelson	United States	27		-	-	-	-	1	9	1	5	11
16	Liisa Savijarvi	Canada	25		-	-	-	12	6	-	7	-	-
	Hélène Barbier	France	25		-	-	-	6	-	-	9	-	10
18	Maria Walliser	Switzerland	24		2	4	-	-	11	-	4	3	-
19	Blanca Fernández Ochoa	Spain	22		4	3	-	-	-	-	-	-	15
20	Zoe Haas	Switzerland	21		-	-	-	-	3	-	5	8	5
	Anne Flore Rey	France	21		-	2	-	8	-	7	-	-	4
22	Monika Hess	Switzerland	17		5	-	-	-	-	-	-	9	3
23	Catherine Quittet	France	15		-	-	4	3	8	-	-	-	-
	Gerry Sorensen	Canada	15		-	-	11	-	4	-	-	-	-
25	Ariane Ehrat	Switzerland	12		-	-	-	-	12	-	-	-	-
26	Brigitte Oertli	Switzerland	11		-	-	3	-	5	-	3	-	-
	Michaela Gerg	West Germany	11		-	-	-	-	-	5	-	6	-
28	Andreja Leskovšek	Yugoslavia	10		-	-	-	-	-	-	10	-	-
	Catherine Andeer	Switzerland	10		-	-	-	-	-	6	2	2	-
30	Diann Roffe	United States	8		-	-	-	-	-	8	-	-	-
31	Diane Haight	Canada	7		-	-	7	-	-	-	-	-	-
32	Daniela Zini	Italy	6		-	6	-	-	-	-	-	-	-
	Claudine Emonet	France	6		-	-	6	-	-	-	-	-	-
	Fabienne Serrat	France	6		-	1	-	4	-	1	-	-	-
35	Élisabeth Chaud	France	5		-	-	5	-	-	-	-	-	-
	Claudia Riedl	Austria	5		-	-	-	5	-	-	-	-	-
37	Anni Kronbichler	Austria	3		3	-	-	-	-	-	-	-	-
38	Sylvia Eder	Austria	2		-	-	-	-	2	-	-	-	-
	Alexandra Mařasová	Czechoslovakia	2		-	-	-	-	-	-	-	-	2
40	Sonja Stotz	West Germany	1		1	-	-	-	-	-	-	-	-
	Regine Mösenlechner	West Germany	1		-	-	1	-	-	-	-	-	-
	Roswitha Steiner	Austria	1		-	-	-	1	-	-	-	-	-

Alpine Skiing World Cup
Women

Overall | Downhill | Giant/Super-G | Slalom | Combined

1984
