= 1983 Alpine Skiing World Cup – Men's combined =

1983 Combined World Cup
Previous: 1982	Next: 1984

Men's combined World Cup 1982/1983

== Calendar ==
Round	Race No	Discipline	Place	Country	Date	Winner	Second	Third
1	5	Super G Downhill	Val d'Isère; Val Gardena	France; Italy	December 12, 1982; December 19, 1982	(Switzerland) Franz Heinzer	(Switzerland) Peter Müller	(Switzerland) Peter Lüscher
2	9	Slalom; Super G	Madonna di Campiglio	Italy	December 21, 1982; December 22, 1982	(Switzerland) Pirmin Zurbriggen	(Austria) Christian Orlainsky	(Austria) Franz Gruber
3	17	Downhill; Slalom	Kitzbühel	Austria	January 21 or 22 1983; January 23, 1983	(United States) Phil Mahre	(Luxembourg) Marc Girardelli	(Switzerland) Peter Lüscher
4	23	Downhill; Slalom	St. Anton	Austria	February 5, 1983; February 6, 1983	(United States) Phil Mahre	(Liechtenstein) Andreas Wenzel	(United States) Steve Mahre
5	26	Downhill; Slalom	Kitzbühel; Markstein	Austria; France	January 21 or 22 1983; February 11, 1983	(United States) Phil Mahre	(Liechtenstein) Andreas Wenzel	(Luxembourg) Marc Girardelli

== Final point standings ==
In men's combined World Cup 1982/83 all 5 results count.

Place	Name	Country	Total points	5 (France) (Italy)	9 (Italy)	17 (Austria)	23 (Austria)	26 (Austria) (France)
1	Phil Mahre	United States	75	-	-	25	25	25
2	Peter Lüscher	Switzerland	52	15	-	15	11	11
3	Marc Girardelli	Luxembourg	47	-	-	20	12	15
	Pirmin Zurbriggen	Switzerland	47	10	25	-	-	12
5	Andreas Wenzel	Liechtenstein	40	-	-	-	20	20
6	Silvano Meli	Switzerland	29	-	-	11	9	9
7	Peter Müller	Switzerland	27	20	-	7	-	-
	Urs Räber	Switzerland	27	11	-	9	-	7
9	Franz Heinzer	Switzerland	25	25	-	-	-	-
10	Bruno Kernen	Switzerland	22	-	-	12	-	10
11	Christian Orlainsky	Austria	20	-	20	-	-	-
12	Steven Lee	Australia	16	-	-	-	8	8
13	Franz Gruber	Austria	15	-	15	-	-	-
	Steve Mahre	United States	15	-	-	-	15	-
15	Harti Weirather	Austria	12	12	-	-	-	-
	Bojan Križaj	Yugoslavia	12	-	12	-	-	-
17	Hubert Strolz	Austria	11	-	11	-	-	-
18	Jacques Lüthy	Switzerland	10	-	10	-	-	-
	Bernhard Fahner	Switzerland	10	-	-	10	-	-
	Gérard Rambaud	France	10	-	-	-	10	-
21	Helmut Höflehner	Austria	9	9	-	-	-	-
	Robert Erlacher	Italy	9	-	9	-	-	-
23	Conradin Cathomen	Switzerland	8	8	-	-	-	-
	Ingemar Stenmark	Sweden	8	-	8	-	-	-
	Peter Šoltys	Czechoslovakia	8	-	-	8	-	-
26	Ken Read	Canada	7	7	-	-	-	-
	Michel Canac	France	7	-	7	-	-	-
	Graham Bell	United Kingdom	7	-	-	-	7	-
29	Danilo Sbardellotto	Italy	6	6	-	-	-	-
	Hannes Spiss	Austria	6	-	6	-	-	-
	Antal Gótzy	Hungary	6	-	-	6	-	-
	Mats Bødker	Denmark	6	-	-	-	6	-
	Hubertus von Hohenlohe	Mexico	6	-	-	-	-	6
34	Michael Mair	Italy	5	5	-	-	-	-
	Ivano Edalini	Italy	5	-	5	-	-	-
	András Völgyesi	Hungary	5	-	-	5	-	-
37	Vladimir Makeev	Soviet Union	4	4	-	-	-	-
	Frank Wörndl	West Germany	4	-	4	-	-	-
39	Guido Hinterseer	Austria	3	3	-	-	-	-
	Max Julen	Switzerland	3	-	3	-	-	-
41	Tris Cochrane	United States	2	2	-	-	-	-
	Vladimir Andreev	Soviet Union	2	-	2	-	-	-
43	Andy Luhn	United States	1	1	-	-	-	-
	Hans Enn	Austria	1	-	1	-	-	-

Note:

Race 3, 4 and 5 races not all points were awarded (not enough finishers).

== Men's combined team results ==
bold indicate highest score - italics indicate race wins

Place	Country	Total points	5 (France) (Italy)	9 (Italy)	17 (Austria)	23 (Austria)	26 (Austria) (France)	Racers	Wins
1	Switzerland	260	**89**	38	64	20	49	11	2
2	United States	93	3	-	25	40	25	4	3
3	Austria	77	24	53	-	-	-	8	0
4	Luxembourg	47	-	-	20	12	15	1	0
5	Liechtenstein	40	-	-	-	20	20	1	0
6	Italy	25	11	14	-	-	-	4	0
7	France	17	-	7	-	10	-	2	0
8	Australia	16	-	-	-	8	8	1	0
9	Yugoslavia	12	-	12	-	-	-	1	0
10	Hungary	11	-	-	11	-	-	2	0
11	Sweden	8	-	8	-	-	-	1	0
	Czechoslovakia	8	-	-	8	-	-	1	0
13	Canada	7	7	-	-	-	-	1	0
	United Kingdom	7	-	-	-	7	-	1	0
15	Soviet Union	6	4	2	-	-	-	2	0
	Denmark	6	-	-	-	6	-	1	0
	Mexico	6	-	-	-	-	6	1	0
18	West Germany	4	-	4	-	-	-	1	0

**Alpine skiing World Cup**
**Men**

Overall | Downhill | Giant/Super G | Slalom | Combined

**1983**
