= 1985 Alpine Skiing World Cup – Women's giant slalom and super-G =

1985 Women's giant slalom and super-G World Cup
Previous: 1984	Next:	Super G 1986; Giant 1986

Women's giant slalom and super-G World Cup 1984/1985

This was the third and last year, when giant slalom and super-G were counted together in one World Cup.

== Calendar ==
Round	Race No	Discipline	Place	Country	Date	Winner	Second	Third
1	3	Super-G	Davos	Switzerland	December 8, 1984	(West Germany) Traudl Hächer	(Switzerland) Maria Walliser	(West Germany) Marina Kiehl
2	7	Giant	Madonna di Campiglio	Italy	December 15, 1984	(West Germany) Marina Kiehl	(Switzerland) Maria Walliser	(Switzerland) Zoe Haas
3	8	Giant	Santa Caterina	Italy	December 17, 1984	(Switzerland) Vreni Schneider	(United States) Tamara McKinney	(West Germany) Maria Epple
4	10	Giant	Maribor	Yugoslavia	January 4, 1985	(Switzerland) Michela Figini	(Switzerland) Vreni Schneider	(Spain) Blanca Fernández Ochoa
5	17	Super-G	Pfronten	West Germany	January 13, 1985	(Switzerland) Michela Figini	(West Germany) Marina Kiehl	(Switzerland) Maria Walliser
6	20	Giant	St. Gervais	France	January 21, 1985	(Switzerland) Michela Figini	(Austria) Elisabeth Kirchler	(France) Anne Flore Rey
7	22	Giant	Arosa	Switzerland	January 26, 1985	(West Germany) Marina Kiehl	(United States) Eva Twardokens	(Switzerland) Michela Figini
8	24	Giant	Vail	United States	March 3, 1985	(Spain) Blanca Fernández Ochoa	(Switzerland) Maria Walliser	(Switzerland) Vreni Schneider (Switzerland) Zoe Haas
9	28	Super-G	Banff	Canada	March 10, 1985	(West Germany) Marina Kiehl	(Switzerland) Michela Figini	(Switzerland) Brigitte Oertli
10	29	Giant	Lake Placid	United States	March 13, 1985	(United States) Diann Roffe	(Socialist Federal Republic of Yugoslavia) Mateja Svet	(West Germany) Marina Kiehl
11	31	Giant	Waterville Valley	United States	March 17, 1985	(Switzerland) Vreni Schneider	(United States) Diann Roffe	(West Germany) Traudl Hächer

== Final point standings ==
In women's giant slalom and super-G World Cup 1984/85 the best 5 results count. 11 racers had a point deduction, which are given in ().

Place	Name	Country	Total points	Deduction	3 (Switzerland) SG	7 (Italy)	8 (Italy)	10 (Socialist Federal Republic of Yugoslavia)	17 (Germany) SG	20 (France)	22 (Switzerland) SG	24 (United States)	28 (Canada) SG	29 (United States)	31 (United States)
1	Marina Kiehl	West Germany	110	(38)	15	25	(11)	-	20	-	25	(4)	25	(15)	(8)
	Michela Figini	Switzerland	110	(18)	-	(8)	(5)	25	25	25	15	(5)	20	-	-
3	Vreni Schneider	Switzerland	88	(1)	-	3	25	20	(1)	-	-	15	-	-	25
4	Maria Walliser	Switzerland	87	(37)	20	20	(1)	12	15	(3)	(9)	20	(7)	(5)	(12)
5	Traudl Hächer	West Germany	71	(9)	25	(5)	-	-	(4)	8	-	11	-	12	15
6	Elisabeth Kirchler	Austria	65		11	12	-	-	12	20	-	10	-	-	-
7	Blanca Fernández Ochoa	Spain	63	(7)	-	-	-	15	10	5	8	25	(4)	(3)	-
8	Zoe Haas	Switzerland	62	(1)	-	15	10	10	-	-	(1)	15	12	-	-
9	Diann Roffe	United States	57		-	7	4	-	-	1	-	-	-	25	20
10	Eva Twardokens	United States	56	(7)	-	-	7	(6)	7	-	20	-	11	(1)	11
11	Tamara McKinney	United States	54		-	9	20	-	-	12	-	-	-	6	7
12	Erika Hess	Switzerland	48	(8)	(6)	(2)	-	11	9	10	11	-	-	7	-
13	Olga Charvátová	Czechoslovakia	44		-	-	-	9	11	-	12	-	10	-	2
14	Maria Epple	West Germany	43		-	-	15	-	-	9	-	8	-	11	-
	Michaela Gerg	West Germany	43	(7)	10	10	6	(4)	-	7	10	-	(3)	-	-
16	Debbie Armstrong	United States	41	(2)	-	11	12	-	-	(2)	-	3	9	-	6
17	Brigitte Oertli	Switzerland	36		12	-	-	-	8	-	-	1	15	-	-
18	Mateja Svet	Yugoslavia	33		-	-	-	-	-	-	-	9	-	20	4
19	Perrine Pelen	France	29		-	-	-	-	-	-	4	7	-	9	9
20	Catherine Quittet	France	28		-	6	-	-	-	4	-	-	8	-	10
21	Christelle Guignard	France	24		-	-	9	-	-	-	-	-	-	10	5
22	Irene Epple	West Germany	20		9	4	-	5	2	-	-	-	-	-	-
	Anne Flore Rey	France	20		-	-	-	-	5	15	-	-	-	-	-
	Cindy Nelson	United States	20		-	-	-	7	-	-	5	2	6	-	-
25	Regine Mösenlechner	West Germany	14		-	-	-	-	-	-	7	-	5	2	-
26	Karin Dedler	West Germany	13		8	-	-	2	-	-	3	-	-	-	-
27	Ingrid Salvenmoser	Austria	11		-	-	-	-	-	11	-	-	-	-	-
	Carole Merle	France	11		-	-	-	-	3	-	2	6	-	-	-
29	Laurie Graham	Canada	10		3	-	-	-	-	-	6	-	1	-	-
	Kartin Stotz	West Germany	8		-	-	8	-	-	-	-	-	-	-	-
	Heidi Zurbriggen	Switzerland	8		4	-	4	-	-	-	-	-	-	-	-
	Andreja Leskovšek	Yugoslavia	8		-	-	-	8	-	-	-	-	-	-	-
	Catharina Glassér-Bjerner	Sweden	8		-	-	-	-	-	-	-	-	-	8	-
34	Heidi Wiesler	West Germany	7		7	-	-	-	-	-	-	-	-	-	-
35	Ariane Ehrat	Switzerland	6		-	-	-	-	6	-	-	-	-	-	-
	Hélène Barbier	France	6		-	-	-	-	-	6	-	-	-	-	-
37	Chatherine Andeer	Switzerland	5		5	-	-	-	-	-	-	-	-	-	-
38	Fulvia Stevenin	Italy	4		-	-	4	-	-	-	-	-	-	-	-
	Karen Lanchaster	United States	4		-	-	-	-	-	-	-	-	-	4	-
	Sylvia Eder	Austria	4		-	1	-	-	-	-	-	-	-	-	3
41	Karla Delago	Italy	3		3	-	-	-	-	-	-	-	-	-	-
	Monika Hess	Switzerland	3		-	-	-	3	-	-	-	-	-	-	-
43	Kerrin Lee	Canada	2		-	-	-	-	-	-	-	-	2	-	-
44	Holly Flanders	United States	1		1	-	-	-	-	-	-	-	-	-	-
	Daniela Zini	Italy	1		-	-	-	1	-	-	-	-	-	-	-
	Anita Wachter	Austria	1		-	-	-	-	-	-	-	-	-	-	1

Alpine Skiing World Cup
Women

Overall | Downhill | Giant/super-G | Slalom | Combined

1985
