= 1983 Alpine Skiing World Cup – Men's downhill =

1983 Men's Downhill World Cup
Previous: 1982	Next: 1984

Men's downhill World Cup 1982/1983

== Calendar ==
Round	Race No	Place	Country	Date	Winner	Second	Third
1	1	Pontresina	Switzerland	December 5, 1982	(Austria) Harti Weirather	(Austria) Franz Klammer	(Switzerland) Peter Müller
2	4	Val Gardena	Italy	December 19, 1982	(Switzerland) Conradin Cathomen	(Austria) Erwin Resch	(Austria) Franz Klammer
3	6	Val Gardena	Italy	December 20, 1982	(Austria) Franz Klammer	(Switzerland) Peter Müller	(Switzerland) Urs Räber
4	11	Val d'Isère	France	January 9, 1983	(Austria) Erwin Resch	(Switzerland) Peter Lüscher	(Switzerland) Conradin Cathomen
5	12	Val d'Isère	France	January 10, 1983	(Switzerland) Conradin Cathomen	(Canada) Ken Read	(Italy) Danilo Sbardellotto
6	14	Kitzbühel	Austria	January 21, 1983	(Switzerland) Bruno Kernen	(Canada) Steve Podborski	(Switzerland) Urs Räber
7	15	Kitzbühel	Austria	January 22, 1983	(Canada) Todd Brooker	(Switzerland) Urs Räber	(Canada) Ken Read
8	18	Sarajevo	Yugoslavia	January 28, 1983	(Austria) Gerhard Pfaffenbichler	(Canada) Steve Podborski	(Austria) Franz Klammer
9	21	St. Anton	Austria	February 5, 1983	(Switzerland) Peter Lüscher	(Switzerland) Silvano Meli	(Austria) Harti Weirather
10	32	Aspen	United States	March 6, 1983	(Canada) Todd Brooker	(Italy) Michael Mair	(Austria) Helmut Höflehner
11	35	Lake Louise	Canada	March 12, 1983	(Austria) Helmut Höflehner	(Austria) Franz Klammer	(Switzerland) Conradin Cathomen

== Final point standings ==
In men's downhill World Cup 1982/83 the best 5 results count. Deductions are given in ().

Place	Name	Country	Total points	Deduction	1 (Switzerland)	4 (Italy)	6 (Italy)	11 (France)	12 (France)	14 (Austria)	15 (Austria)	18 (Socialist Federal Republic of Yugoslavia)	21 (Austria)	32 (United States)	35 (Canada)
1	Franz Klammer	Austria	95	(36)	20	15	25	(4)	(11)	-	(10)	15	(8)	(3)	20
2	Conradin Cathomen	Switzerland	92	(16)	12	25	(7)	15	25	-	(1)	-	-	(8)	15
3	Harti Weirather	Austria	74	(35)	25	(10)	11	(10)	-	11	(5)	(5)	15	12	(5)
4	Erwin Resch	Austria	73	(5)	-	20	-	25	-	-	(2)	(3)	5	11	12
5	Urs Räber	Switzerland	72	(38)	(6)	12	15	(7)	10	15	20	(9)	-	(9)	(7)
	Peter Lüscher	Switzerland	72		-	-	-	20	-	9	8	10	25	-	-
7	Peter Müller	Switzerland	71	(22)	15	-	20	-	12	12	12	-	-	(10)	(12)
8	Ken Read	Canada	69	(27)	(10)	11	(9)	12	20	(3)	15	11	-	(5)	-
9	Todd Brooker	Canada	67	(1)	-	5	10	-	-	-	25	2	(1)	25	-
10	Helmut Höflehner	Austria	65	(17)	11	7	(4)	-	(5)	(6)	-	7	(2)	15	25
11	Steve Podborski	Canada	63		4	-	-	-	-	20	7	20	12	-	-
12	Silvano Meli	Switzerland	56	(15)	(5)	-	-	9	7	8	12	(6)	20	-	(4)
13	Bruno Kernen	Switzerland	55	(8)	(3)	-	6	-	9	25	9	(1)	-	(4)	6
14	Michael Mair	Italy	48		-	2	-	11	3	-	-	12	-	20	-
15	Leonhard Stock	Austria	41	(8)	-	8	8	6	(4)	-	(4)	-	9	-	10
16	Gerhard Pfaffenbichler	Austria	40		-	-	-	-	-	-	-	25	-	6	9
17	Peter Wirnsberger	Austria	32		9	6	3	-	-	-	6	-	-	-	8
18	Phil Mahre	United States	28	(2)	-	-	-	(2)	-	4	3	-	11	7	3
19	Franz Heinzer	Switzerland	23		2	9	12	-	-	-	-	-	-	-	-
20	Vladimir Makeev	Soviet Union	19		8	-	1	1	6	-	-	-	3	-	-
21	Danilo Sbardellotto	Italy	16		1	-	-	-	15	-	-	-	-	-	-
	Fritz Stölzl	Austria	16		-	-	-	8	8	-	-	-	-	-	-
23	Toni Bürgler	Switzerland	15		7	-	-	-	2	-	-	-	6	-	-
24	Stefan Niederseer	Austria	13		-	3	2	-	2	-	-	4	-	-	2
25	Bernhard Flaschberger	Austria	12		-	4	5	3	-	-	-	-	-	-	-
26	Pirmin Zurbriggen	Switzerland	11		-	-	-	-	-	7	-	-	4	-	-
27	Ulrich Spieß	Austria	10		-	-	-	-	-	10	-	-	-	-	-
	Bill Johnson	United States	10		-	-	-	-	-	-	-	-	10	-	-
29	Sepp Wildgruber	West Germany	9		-	-	-	-	-	-	-	8	-	1	-
30	Andreas Wenzel	Liechtenstein	7		-	-	-	-	-	-	-	-	7	-	-
31	Steven Lee	Australia	6		-	-	-	-	-	6	-	-	-	-	-
32	Peter Dürr	West Germany	5		-	-	-	5	-	-	-	-	-	-	-
33	Rob McLeish	Canada	4		-	-	-	-	-	3	-	-	-	-	1
34	Mike Brown	United States	2		-	-	-	-	-	-	-	-	-	2	-
35	Klaus Gattermann	West Germany	1		-	1	-	-	-	-	-	-	-	-	-
	Philippe Verneret	France	1		-	-	-	-	-	1	-	-	-	-	-

== Men's downhill team results ==
All points were shown including individuel deduction. bold indicate highest score - italics indicate race wins

Place	Country	Total points	1 (Switzerland)	4 (Italy)	6 (Italy)	11 (France)	12 (France)	14 (Austria)	15 (Austria)	18 (Socialist Federal Republic of Yugoslavia)	21 (Austria)	34 (United States)	33 (Canada)	Racers	Wins
1	Austria	572	65	73	58	56	30	27	27	59	39	47	**91**	11	5
2	Switzerland	566	50	46	60	51	65	76	62	26	55	31	44	9	4
3	Canada	231	14	16	19	12	20	26	47	33	13	30	1	4	2
4	Italy	64	1	2	-	11	18	-	-	12	-	20	-	2	0
5	United States	42	-	-	-	2	-	4	3	-	21	9	3	3	0
6	Soviet Union	19	8	-	1	1	6	-	-	-	3	-	-	1	0
7	West Germany	15	-	1	-	5	-	-	-	8	-	1	-	3	0
8	Liechtenstein	7	-	-	-	-	-	-	-	-	7	-	-	1	0
9	Australia	6	-	-	-	-	-	6	-	-	-	-	-	1	0
10	France	1	-	-	-	-	-	1	-	-	-	-	-	1	0

**Alpine skiing World Cup**
**Men**

Overall | Downhill | Giant/Super G | Slalom | Combined

**1983**
