= Flying Mile =

Ski course in Canada

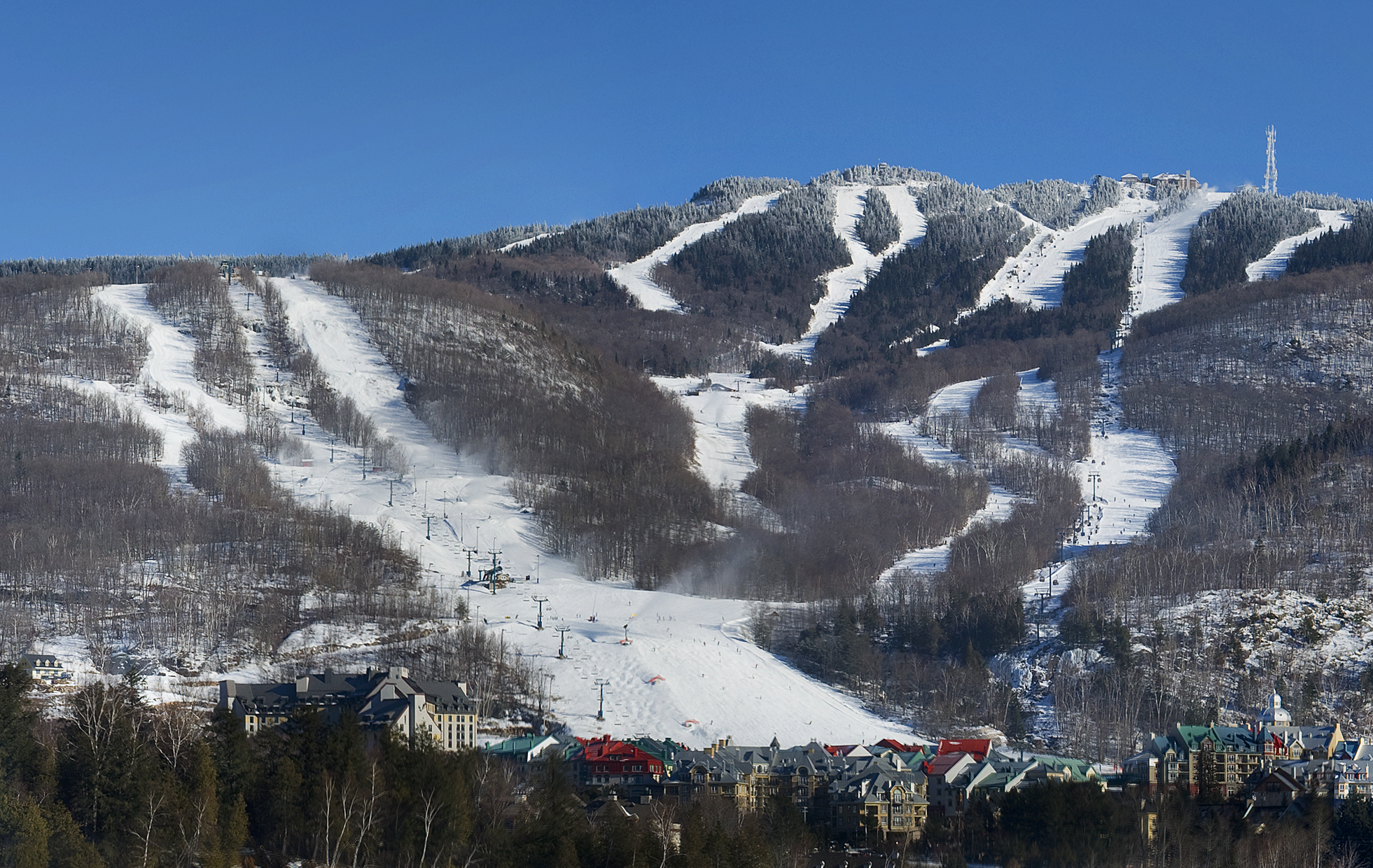
- Interactive map of Flying Mile
- Location in Canada Location in Quebec
- 46°13′1.4″N 74°34′42″W
- Location: Mont-Tremblant, Quebec, Canada
- Mountain: Flying Mile Peak
- Opened: 1983 (race course); 43 years ago

Giant Slalom
- Start: 590 m (1,936 ft) (AA)
- Finish: 270 m (886 ft)
- Vertical drop: 320 m (1,050 ft)

Flying Mile is a women's World Cup technical ski course in Mont-Tremblant town in Quebec, Canada, first held in 1983. The course is part of Mont Tremblant Ski Resort, located at Flying Mile Peak.

The course profile is straight with an average incline at 28%; it starts at 565 metres (1,854 ft) above sea level with a vertical drop of 230 m (755 ft) and a course length of 1,200 m (0.75 mi). Characterized by a persistent low slope along its entire length, it is dotted with the presence of various changes in slope and bumps. The initial flat part leads to a short wall (steepest part) which ends in a very undulating section which continues up to a few tens of meters from the finish line, located at the end of a short wall.

== History ==
In 1983 season first ever World Cup events were organised, with women's downhill and giant slalom. Canadian skier Laurie Graham won the downhill and French skier Anne Flore Rey.

In 1994 new chairlift, with the same name as this course, was built along the slope and mountain.

In 2023/24 season World Cup events returned after 40 years break with two women's giant slaloms.

In 2024/25 season, two planned women's World Cup giant slaloms were cancelled due to lack of snow.

== World Cup ==
=== Women ===
No.	Type	Date	Season	Winner	Second	Third
413	DH	6 March 1983	1982/83	(Canada) Laurie Graham	(Switzerland) Maria Walliser	(Switzerland) Michela Figini
414	GS	7 March 1983	1982/83	(Austria) Anne Flore Rey	(West Germany) Maria Epple	(Switzerland) Erika Hess
1778	GS	2 December 2023	2023/24	(Italy) Federica Brignone	(Slovakia) Petra Vlhová	(United States) Mikaela Shiffrin
1779	GS	3 December 2023	2023/24	(Italy) Federica Brignone	(Switzerland) Lara Gut-Behrami	(United States) Mikaela Shiffrin
	GS	7 December 2024	2024/25	cancelled due to lack of snow		
	GS	8 December 2024	2024/25	cancelled due to lack of snow		
1851	GS	6 December 2025	2025/26	(New Zealand) Alice Robinson	(Croatia) Zrinka Ljutić	(Canada) Valérie Grenier
1852	GS	7 December 2025	2025/26	(Austria) Julia Scheib	(Sweden) Sara Hector	(New Zealand) Alice Robinson
