= 1983 Alpine Skiing World Cup – Women's slalom =

1983 Women's slalom World Cup
Previous: 1982	Next: 1984

Women's slalom World Cup 1982/1983

== Calendar ==
Round	Race No	Place	Country	Date	Winner	Second	Third
1	4	Limone Piemonte	Italy	December 10, 1982	(United States) Tamara McKinney	(Switzerland) Erika Hess	(Liechtenstein) Hanni Wenzel
2	6	Piancavallo	Italy	December 17, 1982	(Switzerland) Erika Hess	(France) Perrine Pelen	(United States) Christin Cooper
3	10	Davos	Switzerland	January 11, 1983	(United States) Tamara McKinney	(Switzerland) Erika Hess	(France) Perrine Pelen
4	12	Schruns	Austria	January 16, 1983	(Austria) Anni Kronbichler	(Italy) Maria Rosa Quario (Poland) Małgorzata Tlałka
5	18	Les Diablerets	Switzerland	January 30, 1983	(Italy) Maria Rosa Quario	(Liechtenstein) Hanni Wenzel	(Poland) Dorota Tlałka
6	21	Maribor	Yugoslavia	February 9, 1983	(Switzerland) Erika Hess	(Liechtenstein) Hanni Wenzel	(Austria) Anni Kronbichler
7	22	Vysoké Tatry	Czechoslovakia	February 12, 1983	(Italy) Maria Rosa Quario	(Switzerland) Erika Hess	(Poland) Małgorzata Tlałka
8	25	Waterville Valley	United States	March 8, 1983	(Austria) Roswitha Steiner	(United States) Tamara McKinney	(Liechtenstein) Hanni Wenzel
9	30	Furano	Japan	March 20, 1983	(United States) Tamara McKinney	(Switzerland) Erika Hess	(Poland) Małgorzata Tlałka

== Final point standings ==
In women's slalom World Cup 1982/83 the best 5 results count. Deductions are given in ().

Place	Name	Country	Total points	Deduction	4 (Italy)	6 (Italy)	10 (Switzerland)	12 (Austria)	18 (Switzerland)	21 (Socialist Federal Republic of Yugoslavia)	22 (Czechoslovakia)	25 (United States)	30 (Japan)
1	Erika Hess	Switzerland	110	(20)	20	25	20	-	-	25	20	-	(20)
2	Tamara McKinney	United States	105		25	-	25	-	10	-	-	20	25
3	Maria Rosa Quario	Italy	89	(7)	12	7	(5)	20	25	-	25	(2)	-
4	Hanni Wenzel	Liechtenstein	82	(23)	15	12	(11)	-	20	20	-	15	(12)
5	Roswitha Steiner	Austria	70	(10)	-	-	10	11	12	-	12	25	(10)
6	Anni Kronbichler	Austria	66	(15)	7	(6)	(3)	25	9	15	-	10	(6)
7	Małgorzata Tlałka	Poland	65		-	-	-	20	4	-	15	11	15
8	Dorota Tlałka	Poland	54	(15)	(1)	8	-	12	15	10	(8)	(6)	9
9	Daniela Zini	Italy	46	(7)	11	-	-	-	7	11	10	7	(7)
	Petra Wenzel	Liechtenstein	46	(3)	-	-	9	(3)	11	12	9	5	-
11	Perrine Pelen	France	45		4	20	15	-	6	-	-	-	-
	Maria Epple	West Germany	45	(10)	10	11	7	(6)	8	9	-	-	(4)
13	Paoletta Magoni	Italy	39	(7)	8	10	8	-	5	(2)	(5)	-	8
14	Olga Charvátová	Czechoslovakia	35		-	-	4	10	-	-	6	10	5
15	Ursula Konzett	Liechtenstein	31		9	-	-	-	-	-	11	-	11
16	Christin Cooper	United States	27		-	15	12	-	-	-	-	-	-
17	Lorena Frigo	Italy	23		6	9	-	5	-	-	-	-	3
18	Monika Hess	Switzerland	20		-	-	-	-	1	7	-	12	-
19	Anja Zavadlav	Yugoslavia	16		5	2	-	2	-	-	7	-	-
20	Fabienne Serrat	France	14		-	1	-	8	-	1	1	3	-
21	Alexandra Mařasová	Czechoslovakia	9		-	-	-	9	-	-	-	-	-
	Brigitte Nansoz	Switzerland	9		-	5	-	-	-	4	-	-	-
	Karin Buder	Austria	9		-	-	6	-	-	-	3	-	-
24	Ewa Grabowska	Poland	8		-	-	-	-	-	8	-	-	-
	Hélène Barbier	France	8		-	-	-	-	-	-	-	8	-
26	Rosi Aschenwald	Austria	7		-	-	-	7	-	-	-	-	-
27	Blanca Fernández Ochoa	Spain	6		-	-	-	-	-	6	-	-	-
	Anne Flore Rey	France	6		-	-	-	-	-	-	2	4	-
29	Paola Toniolli	Italy	5		-	3	2	-	-	-	-	-	-
	Christa Kinshofer	West Germany	5		-	-	-	-	-	5	-	-	-
	Brigitte Oertli	Switzerland	5		2	-	-	-	-	3	-	-	-
32	Fulvia Stevenin	Italy	4		-	4	-	-	-	-	-	-	-
	Ida Ladstätter	Austria	4		-	-	-	4	-	-	-	-	-
	Lea Sölkner	Austria	4		-	-	-	-	-	-	4	-	-
35	Andreja Leskovšek	Yugoslavia	3		3	-	-	-	-	-	-	-	-
	Heidi Preuss	United States	3		-	-	-	-	3	-	-	-	-
	Michaela Gerg	West Germany	3		-	-	-	-	2	-	-	1	-
38	Irene Epple	West Germany	2		-	-	-	-	-	-	-	-	2
39	Renate Lazak	West Germany	1		-	-	1	-	-	-	-	-	-
	Sylvia Eder	Austria	1		-	-	-	1	-	-	-	-	-
	Cindy Nelson	United States	1		-	-	-	-	-	-	-	-	1

Alpine skiing World Cup
Women

Overall | Downhill | Giant/Super G | Slalom | Combined

1983
