= 1983 Alpine Skiing World Cup – Men's slalom =

1983 Men's Slalom World Cup
Previous: 1982	Next: 1984

Men's slalom World Cup 1982/1983

== Calendar ==
Round	Race No	Place	Country	Date	Winner	Second	Third
1	3	Courmayeur	Italy	December 14, 1982	(Sweden) Ingemar Stenmark	(Sweden) Stig Strand	(United States) Phil Mahre
2	7	Madonna di Campiglio	Italy	December 21, 1982	(Sweden) Stig Strand	(Sweden) Ingemar Stenmark	(United States) Phil Mahre
3	10	Parpan	Switzerland	January 4, 1983	(United States) Steve Mahre	(Switzerland) Jacques Lüthy	(Liechtenstein) Andreas Wenzel
4	16	Kitzbühel	Austria	January 23, 1983	(Sweden) Ingemar Stenmark	(Austria) Christian Orlainsky	(United States) Phil Mahre
5	20	Kranjska Gora	Yugoslavia	January 30, 1983	(Austria) Franz Gruber	(Sweden) Stig Strand	(France) Michel Canac
6	22	St. Anton	Austria	February 6, 1983	(United States) Steve Mahre	(Liechtenstein) Andreas Wenzel	(United States) Phil Mahre
7	25	Markstein	France	February 11, 1983	(Sweden) Ingemar Stenmark	(Italy) Paolo De Chiesa	(United States) Phil Mahre
8	27	Markstein	France	February 12, 1983	(Socialist Federal Republic of Yugoslavia) Bojan Križaj	(Sweden) Bengt Fjällberg	(Austria) Christian Orlainsky
9	29	Tärnaby	Sweden	February 23, 1983	(Liechtenstein) Andreas Wenzel	(Sweden) Stig Strand	(Socialist Federal Republic of Yugoslavia) Bojan Križaj
10	31	Gällivare	Sweden	February 27, 1983	(Luxembourg) Marc Girardelli	(Sweden) Stig Strand	(Sweden) Ingemar Stenmark
11	37	Furano	Japan	March 20, 1983	(Sweden) Stig Strand	(Liechtenstein) Andreas Wenzel	(Socialist Federal Republic of Yugoslavia) Bojan Križaj

== Final point standings ==
In men's slalom World Cup 1982/83 the best 5 results count. Deductions are given in ().

Place	Name	Country	Total points	Deduction	3 (Italy)	7 (Italy)	10 (Switzerland)	16 (Austria)	20 (Socialist Federal Republic of Yugoslavia)	22 (Austria)	25 (France)	27 (France)	29 (Sweden)	31 (Sweden)	37 (Japan)
1	Ingemar Stenmark	Sweden	110	(10)	25	20	-	25	-	-	25	(10)	-	15	-
	Stig Strand	Sweden	110	(44)	20	25	-	(9)	20	-	(3)	(12)	20	(20)	25
3	Andreas Wenzel	Liechtenstein	92	(9)	-	-	15	-	-	20	12	(9)	25	-	20
4	Steve Mahre	United States	80	(5)	12	8	25	10	-	25	(5)	-	-	-	-
5	Bojan Križaj	Yugoslavia	78	(17)	11	12	-	-	-	-	(6)	25	15	(11)	15
6	Phil Mahre	United States	75	(33)	15	15	-	15	-	15	15	(11)	-	(12)	(10)
7	Marc Girardelli	Luxembourg	69	(6)	(6)	-	-	12	-	9	11	-	12	25	-
8	Paolo De Chiesa	Italy	67	(38)	(9)	11	12	(11)	12	-	20	-	(8)	(10)	12
9	Franz Gruber	Austria	66	(22)	-	9	11	-	25	(6)	(9)	-	10	(7)	11
10	Christian Orlainsky	Austria	62		10	10	-	20	-	-	-	15	-	-	7
11	Michel Canac	France	52	(10)	-	7	9	(7)	15	12	-	(3)	-	-	9
12	Bengt Fjällberg	Sweden	49	(1)	(1)	-	-	4	-	8	8	20	-	9	-
13	Jacques Lüthy	Switzerland	42	(2)	2	2	20	-	-	(2)	10	8	-	-	-
14	Paul Frommelt	Liechtenstein	34		-	-	-	-	11	10	7	-	6	-	-
	Ivano Edalini	Italy	34		3	6	-	-	-	11	-	-	11	3	-
16	Petar Popangelov	Bulgaria	33	(4)	-	(4)	-	6	5	7	-	6	9	-	-
17	Lars-Göran Halvarsson	Sweden	27		5	3	-	-	10	-	-	4	-	5	-
18	Klaus Heidegger	Austria	23		-	-	5	-	9	-	4	5	-	-	-
19	Jože Kuralt	Yugoslavia	22		-	-	-	-	-	3	1	7	-	6	5
20	Alex Giorgi	Italy	20		-	-	-	-	3	-	2	-	7	-	8
21	Pirmin Zurbriggen	Switzerland	13		8	5	-	-	-	-	-	-	-	-	-
	Max Julen	Switzerland	13		7	-	6	-	-	-	-	-	-	-	-
23	Frank Wörndl	West Germany	12		-	-	8	-	-	4	-	-	-	-	-
24	Peter Mally	Italy	11		4	-	-	-	-	-	-	-	5	2	-
25	Hans Pieren	Switzerland	10		-	-	10	-	-	-	-	-	-	-	-
	Michel Vion	France	10		-	-	-	5	-	-	-	-	5	-	-
27	Didier Bouvet	France	9		-	-	-	2	7	-	-	-	-	-	-
	Daniel Fontaine	France	9		-	-	-	8	-	-	-	1	-	-	-
29	Helmut Gstrein	Austria	8		-	-	-	-	8	-	-	-	-	-	-
	Paul Arne Skajem	Norway	8		-	-	-	-	2	1	-	-	5	-	-
	Jörgen Sundqvist	Sweden	8		-	-	-	-	-	-	-	-	-	8	-
32	Marco Tonazzi	Italy	7		-	-	7	-	-	-	-	-	-	-	-
33	Daniel Mougel	France	6		-	-	3	3	-	-	-	-	-	-	-
	Florian Beck	West Germany	6		-	-	-	-	6	-	-	-	-	-	-
	Robert Erlacher	Italy	6		-	-	-	-	-	-	-	-	-	-	6
	Jure Franko	Yugoslavia	6		-	-	4	-	-	-	-	-	-	-	2
37	Odd Sørli	Norway	5		-	-	-	-	-	5	-	-	-	-	-
38	Hannes Spiss	Austria	4		-	-	-	-	4	-	-	-	-	-	-
	Joël Gaspoz	Switzerland	4		-	-	-	-	-	-	-	-	-	4	-
	Naomine Iwaya	Japan	4		-	-	-	-	-	-	-	-	-	-	4
41	Vladimir Andreev	Soviet Union	3		-	1	2	-	-	-	-	-	-	-	-
	Tomaž Cerkovnik	Yugoslavia	3		-	-	-	1	1	-	-	-	1	-	-
	Hiroaki Ohtaka	Japan	3		-	-	-	-	-	-	-	-	-	-	3
44	Toshihiro Kaiwa	Japan	2		-	-	2	-	-	-	-	-	-	-	-
	Oswald Tötsch	Italy	2		-	-	-	-	-	-	-	2	-	-	-
	Joakim Wallner	Sweden	2		-	-	-	-	-	-	-	-	2	-	-
47	Yves Tavernier	France	1		-	-	-	-	-	-	-	-	-	1	-
	Wataru Mizutani	Japan	1		-	-	-	-	-	-	-	-	-	-	1

== Men's slalom team results ==
All points were shown including individuel deduction. bold indicate highest score - italics indicate race wins

Place	Country	Total points	3 (Italy)	7 (Italy)	10 (Switzerland)	16 (Austria)	20 (Socialist Federal Republic of Yugoslavia)	22 (Austria)	25 (France)	27 (France)	29 (Sweden)	31 (Sweden)	37 (Japan)	Racers	Wins
1	Sweden	361	51	48	-	38	30	8	36	46	22	**57**	25	6	5
2	United States	193	27	23	25	25	-	40	20	11	-	12	10	2	2
3	Italy	185	16	17	19	11	15	11	22	2	31	15	26	7	0
	Austria	185	10	19	16	20	46	6	13	20	10	7	18	5	1
5	Liechtenstein	135	-	-	15	-	11	30	19	9	31	-	20	2	1
6	Yugoslavia	126	11	12	4	1	1	3	7	32	16	17	22	4	1
7	France	97	-	7	12	25	22	12	-	4	5	1	9	6	0
8	Switzerland	84	17	7	36	-	-	2	10	8	-	4	-	5	0
9	Luxembourg	75	6	-	-	12	-	9	11	-	12	25	-	1	1
10	Bulgaria	37	-	4	-	6	5	7	-	6	9	-	-	1	0
11	West Germany	18	-	-	8	-	6	4	-	-	-	-	-	2	0
12	Norway	13	-	-	-	-	2	6	-	-	5	-	-	2	0
13	Japan	10	-	-	2	-	-	-	-	-	-	-	8	4	0
14	Soviet Union	3	-	1	2	-	-	-	-	-	-	-	-	1	0

**Alpine skiing World Cup**
**Men**

Overall | Downhill | Giant/Super G | Slalom | Combined

**1983**
