= Marilla Guss =

Australian alpine skier (born 1963)

Personal information
- Nationality: Belgian
- Born: 9 July 1963 (age 61); Melbourne, Australia

Sport
- Sport: Alpine skiing

Marilla Guss (born 9 July 1963) is an Australian alpine skier. She competed in the women's downhill at the 1984 Winter Olympics.
