= Karen Stemmle =

Canadian alpine skier (born 1964)

Karen Stemmle (born 27 January 1964) is a Canadian former alpine skier who competed in the 1984 Winter Olympics. Karen specialized in the Downhill discipline where she reached speeds of up to 140 km/h (87 mph). She raced on the World Cup Alpine Ski Circuit for 5 years with her best finishes being a 4th place in Verbier, Switzerland and a 4th place in Sunshine, Alberta, Canada. Karen had 5 top 10 World Cup finished in her career and finished 11th overall in the Downhill standings in 1985. Karen's younger brother, Brian Stemmle, competed in 4 Olympics between 1988 and 1998. Karen was proudly inducted into the Aurora Sports Hall Of Fame in 2016.
