= Maria Maricich =

American alpine skier (born 1961)

Maria Maricich (born March 30, 1961, in Sun Valley, Idaho) is an American retired alpine skier who competed in the women's downhill at the 1984 Winter Olympics, finishing 19th.
