= Alexandra Mařasová =

Alpine skier (born 1965)

Alexandra Mařasová (born 26 October 1965) is a former alpine skier who competed for Czechoslovakia in the 1984 Winter Olympics.
