= Doris de Agostini =

Swiss alpine skier (1958–2020)

Medal record

Women's Alpine Skiing

World Championships
| Bronze medal – third place | 1978 Garmisch-Partenkirchen | Downhill |

Doris de Agostini-Rossetti (28 April 1958 – 22 November 2020) was a Swiss alpine skier, bronze-medalist in the Alpine World Ski Championships 1978 and winner of the 1982/1983 Downhill World Cup. She also competed at the 1976 Winter Olympics and the 1980 Winter Olympics.

== World Cup victories ==
| Date | Location | Race |
|---|---|---|
| 21 January 1976 | (Austria) Bad Gastein | Downhill |
| 12 January 1981 | (Austria) Schruns | Downhill |
| 28 January 1981 | (France) Megève | Downhill |
| 19 December 1981 | (Austria) Saalbach-Hinterglemm | Downhill |
| 14 February 1982 | (Switzerland) Arosa | Downhill |
| 7 December 1982 | (France) Val-d'Isère | Downhill |
| 14 January 1983 | (Austria) Schruns | Downhill |
| 29 January 1983 | (Switzerland) Les Diablerets | Downhill |

Awards
| Preceded by (Switzerland) Erika Hess | Swiss Sportswoman of the Year; 1983 | Succeeded by (Switzerland) Michela Figini |
