= Bruno Kernen (born 1961) =

Swiss alpine skier (born 1961)

Personal information
- Born: 25 March 1961 (age 65) Schönried, Switzerland

Sport
- Sport: alpine skiing

Bruno Kernen (born 25 March 1961) is a Swiss former World Cup alpine skier, winner of the Kitzbühel downhill race in January 1983.

Born in Schönried, Bern, he currently runs a hotel in his hometown with his family.
