= Stig Strand =

Swedish alpine skier

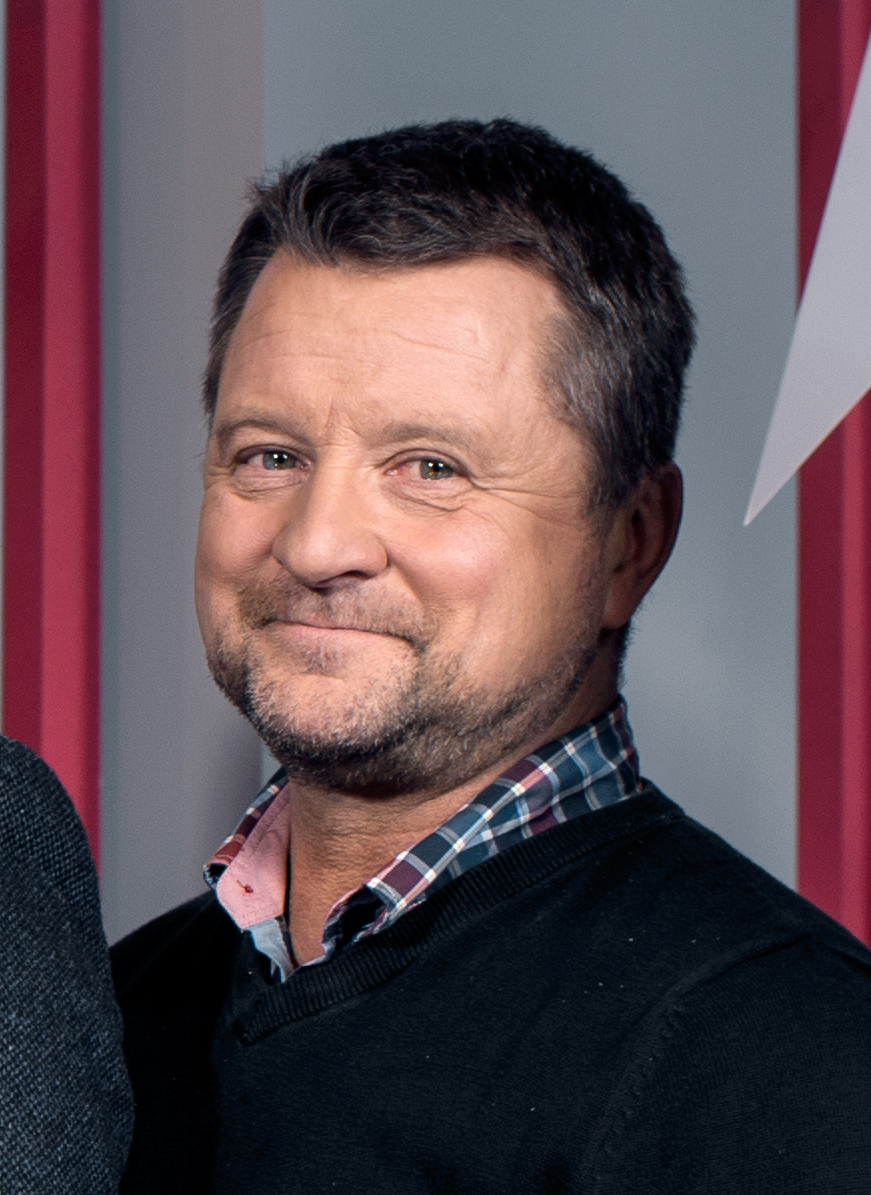
- Stig Strand in December 2014

Personal information
- Full name: Stig Ivar Strand
- Nationality: Sweden
- Born: 25 August 1956 (age 69) Tärnaby, Sweden

Sport
- Sport: Skiing

Stig Strand (born 25 August 1956) is a Swedish former alpine skier and a sports commentator on alpine skiing. He is known for being sports commentator for SVT during many years after his career, and a few years on Eurosport, but ended TV commenting in 2016. He has also worked as a political advisor for the Swedish Social Democratic Party, and as a hotel owner.

Although successful, he was during his active years always in the shadow of his childhood neighbour Ingemar Stenmark. However, in the 1982–83 season, Strand also had 110 points like Stenmark in the slalom World Cup.

== Individual World Cup victories ==
Date	Location	Race
22 December 1982	(Italy) Madonna di Campiglio	Slalom
20 March 1983	(Japan) Furano	Slalom
