= Tamara McKinney =

American alpine skier

Personal information
- Born: October 16, 1962 (age 63) Lexington, Kentucky, U.S.
- Height: 5 ft 4 in (1.63 m)
- Website: tamaramckinney.com

Skiing career
- Sport: Alpine skiing
- Retired: November 1990 (age 28)
- Disciplines: Giant slalom, slalom, combined
- World Cup debut: December 1978 (age 16)

Olympics
- Teams: 3 – (1980, 1984, 1988)
- Medals: 0

World Championships
- Teams: 5 – (1980–1989)
- Medals: 4 (1 gold)

World Cup
- Seasons: 11 – (1979–1989)
- Wins: 18 – (9 GS, 9 SL)
- Podiums: 45
- Overall titles: 1 – (1983)
- Discipline titles: 3 – (2 GS, 1 SL)
Medal record
Women's alpine skiing
Representing the United States
World Cup race podiums
Event	1st	2nd	3rd
Slalom	9	8	8
Giant slalom	9	3	4
Super-G	0	0	1
Combined	0	2	1
Total	18	13	14
World Championships
Gold medal – first place	1989 Vail	Combined
Bronze medal – third place	1989 Vail	Slalom
Bronze medal – third place	1987 Crans-Montana	Combined
Bronze medal – third place	1985 Bormio	Combined

Tamara McKinney (born October 16, 1962) is a former World Cup alpine ski racer from the United States. She won four World Cup season titles, most notably the 1983 overall, the first American woman title holder for a quarter century. McKinney's other three season titles were in giant slalom (1981, 1983) and slalom (1984). She was a world champion in the combined event in 1989, her final year of competition.

Her half-brother Steve McKinney was a world-record holding speed skier, setting seven world records and breaking his own record twice.

== Life and career ==
Born in Lexington, Kentucky, the diminutive McKinney (5 ft 4 in (1.63 m), 115 lb (52 kg)) grew up in Squaw Valley, California, the youngest of seven children.

She made her World Cup debut in December 1978 at age 16 with a podium finish in a slalom in Italy. Her first World Cup victory came at age 18 in January 1981, the first of four wins in giant slalom that breakthrough season. McKinney raced on the World Cup circuit for eleven seasons, and competed in three Olympics and five world championships. She won four medals in the world championships; bronze medals in the combined (1985, 1987) and slalom (1989), and a gold medal in the combined at Vail in 1989.

While winning the overall World Cup in 1983 at age 20, she also won the giant slalom title, which she had first won in 1981. In 1984 McKinney won the slalom title, and took fourth place in the giant slalom at the Winter Olympics in Sarajevo, behind teammates Debbie Armstrong and Christin Cooper. McKinney participated in Prince Edward of the United Kingdom's charity television special The Grand Knockout Tournament in 1987.

While training for the upcoming 1990 season, McKinney broke her left leg (for the third time) in Saas Fee, Switzerland, in mid-October 1989. Slow to recover, she announced her retirement in November 1990 at age 28 and completed her career with 18 World Cup victories, 45 podiums, and 99 top ten finishes. Eight of her victories were in the U.S., with six at Waterville Valley, New Hampshire, which included double victories in 1983 and 1984. Along with Gretchen Fraser, Andrea Mead Lawrence, Lindsey Vonn, and Mikaela Shiffrin, McKinney is regarded as one of the top female alpine ski racers in U.S. history.

She was inducted in the Kentucky Athletic Hall of Fame in 2004, was a realtor in the Lake Tahoe area, and is now coaching skiing at the Aspen Valley Ski Club in Aspen, Colorado for Johno McBride.

== World Cup results ==
=== Season standings ===
Season	Age	Overall	Slalom	Giant slalom	Super G	Downhill	Combined
1979	16	25	21	13	not run	—	—
1980	17	14	10	24	not run	—	—
1981	18	6	7	1	not run	—	12
1982	19	9	12	4	not run	—	—
1983	20	1	2	1	not awarded (w/ GS)	—	6
1984	21	3	1	3	not awarded (w/ GS)	—	9
1985	22	8	2	11	not awarded (w/ GS)	—	17
1986	23	24	14	20	31	—	28
1987	24	6	2	10	32	—	—
1988	25	54	—	19	—	—	—
1989	26	11	3	13	—	—	8
1990	27	injured in October, missed entire season					

=== Season titles ===
Season	Discipline
1981	Giant slalom
1983	Overall
1983	Giant slalom
1984	Slalom

=== Race victories ===
- 18 wins - (9 GS, 9 SL)
- 45 podiums

Season	Date	Location	Discipline
1981	20 Jan 1981	Haute-Nendaz, Switzerland	Giant slalom
1981	24 Jan 1981	Les Gets, France	Giant slalom
1981	8 Mar 1981	(United States) Aspen, CO, USA	Giant slalom
1983	5 Dec 1982	Limone Piemonte, Italy	Slalom
1983	9 Jan 1983	Davos, Switzerland	Slalom
1983	23 Jan 1983	St. Gervais, France	Giant slalom
1983	8 Mar 1983	(United States) Waterville Valley, NH, USA	Giant slalom
1983	9 Mar 1983	(United States) Waterville Valley, NH, USA	Giant slalom
1983	13 Mar 1983	(United States) Vail, CO, USA	Giant slalom
1983	20 Mar 1983	Furano, Japan	Slalom
1984	10 Mar 1984	(United States) Waterville Valley, NH, USA	Giant slalom
1984	11 Mar 1984	(United States) Waterville Valley, NH, USA	Slalom
1984	21 Mar 1984	Zwiesel, West Germany	Giant slalom
1984	24 Mar 1984	Oslo, Norway	Slalom
1985	5 Jan 1985	(Socialist Federal Republic of Yugoslavia) Maribor, Yugoslavia	Slalom
1985	16 Mar 1985	(United States) Waterville Valley, NH, USA	Slalom
1987	18 Dec 1986	Courmayeur, Italy	Slalom
1987	11 Jan 1987	Mellau, Austria	Slalom

== World championship results ==
Year	Age	Slalom	Giant slalom	Super-G	Downhill	Combined
1980	17	DNF1	DNF1	not run	—	—
1982	19	DNF1	6	not run	—	—
1985	22	DNF	DNF	not run	—	3
1987	24	DNF1	18	—	—	3
1989	26	3	DNF	—	—	1

From 1948 through 1980, the Winter Olympics were also the World Championships for alpine skiing.

== Olympic results ==
Year	Age	Slalom	Giant slalom	Super-G	Downhill	Combined
1980	17	DNF1	DNF1	not run	—	not run
1984	21	DNF1	4	not run	—	not run
1988	25	DNF1	DNF1	—	—	—

== Video ==
- You Tube.com – 1989 World Championships – gold medal in combined
