= Caroline Attia =

French alpine skier (born 1960)

Caroline Attia (born 4 July 1960) is a French former alpine skier who competed in the 1980 Winter Olympics and 1984 Winter Olympics.
