= Marie-Luce Waldmeier =

French alpine skier (born 1960)

Marie-Luce Waldmeier (born 1 July 1960 in Ambilly) is a French former alpine skier who competed in the 1980 Winter Olympics and 1984 Winter Olympics.
