= Silvano Meli =

Swiss alpine skier (born 1960)

Personal information
- Born: 11 August 1960 (age 65) Leysin, Switzerland

Skiing career
- Sport: Alpine skiing
- Retired: 1986
- Disciplines: Speed events
- World Cup debut: 1978

World Cup
- Seasons: 8
- Podiums: 1

Silvano Meli (born 11 August 1960) is a Swiss former alpine skier.

== World Cup results ==
Podium

Date	Place	Discipline	Position
05-02-1983	(Austria) St. Anton	Downhill	2nd
