= Conradin Cathomen =

Swiss alpine skier (born 1959)

Medal record

Men's alpine skiing
Silver medal – second place	1982 Schladming	Downhill

Conradin Cathomen (born 2 June 1959 in Laax) is a former Swiss alpine skier. He won the silver medal at the FIS Alpine World Ski Championships 1982. He also competed in the men's downhill at the 1984 Winter Olympics.

== World Cup victories ==
Date	Location	Race
19 December 1982	(Italy) Val Gardena	Downhill
10 January 1983	(France) Val d'Isère	Downhill
