= Anni Kronbichler =

Austrian alpine skier (born 1963)

Personal information
- Born: 22 March 1963 (age 63) Kufstein, Austria
- Height: 1.76 m (5 ft 9 in)

Skiing career
- Sport: Alpine skiing
- Retired: 1988
- Disciplines: Technical events
- World Cup debut: 1980

Olympics
- Teams: 1

World Championships
- Teams: 2

World Cup
- Seasons: 9
- Wins: 3
- Podiums: 7
Medal record
Women's alpine skiing
Representing Austria
World Cup race podiums
Event	1st	2nd	3rd
Slalom	3	2	2

Anni Kronbichler (born 22 March 1963) is an Austrian former alpine skier who competed in the 1984 Winter Olympics.

== Career ==
During her career she has achieved 27 results among the top 10 (7 podiums) in the World Cup.

== World Cup results ==
Top 3

Date	Place	Discipline	Rank
12-01-1986	(Austria) Bad Gastein	Slalom	1
16-03-1985	(United States) Waterville Valley	Slalom	3
22-01-1984	(Switzerland) Verbier	Slalom	1
09-02-1983	(Slovenia) Maribor	Slalom	3
16-01-1983	(Austria) Schruns	Slalom	1
22-01-1982	(Germany) Lenggries	Slalom	2
21-12-1981	(France) St. Gervais	Slalom	2
