= Peter Lüscher =

Swiss alpine skier (born 1956)

Personal information
- Born: 14 October 1956 (age 69) Romanshorn, Italy

Skiing career
- Sport: Alpine skiing
- Retired: 1985
- Disciplines: Polyvalent
- World Cup debut: 1975

Olympics
- Teams: 2

World Championships
- Teams: 4
- Medals: 1

World Cup
- Seasons: 11
- Wins: 6
- Podiums: 24
Medal record
Men's alpine skiing
Representing Switzerland
World Cup race podiums
Event	1st	2nd	3rd
Slalom	1	1	1
Giant slalom	0	4	2
Downhill	1	2	0
Super-G	1	1	0
Combined	3	2	6
Total	6	10	9
World Championships
Silver medal – second place	1982 Schladming	Combined

Peter Lüscher (born 14 October 1956) is a Swiss former alpine ski racer who won an overall World Cup in 1979.

== Biography ==
Born in Romanshorn in the canton of Thurgau, he won the overall World Cup title in 1979 and a silver medal at the Alpine Ski World Championships in 1982.

He is married to Fabienne Serrat.

== World Cup results ==
=== Season standings ===
Season	Age	Overall	Slalom	Giant Slalom	Super G	Downhill	Combined
1975	18	52	—	—	not run	—	
1976	19	25	19	14	not run	17	8
1977	20	36	24	24	not run	25	not awarded
1978	21	16	13	6	not run	—	not awarded
1979	22	1	6	2	not run	—	not awarded
1980	23	9	26	11	not run	—	4
1981	24	58	—	—	not run	34	20
1982	25	28	34	27	not run	28	9
1983	26	5	—	7	not awarded	5	2
1984	27	55	—	—	not awarded	27	11
1985	28	16	—	31	not awarded	14	4

=== Season titles ===
Season	Discipline
1979	Overall

=== Individual races ===
- 6 wins – (1 DH, 1 SG, 1 SL, 3 K)
- 25 podiums

Season	Date	Location	Discipline
1979	10 Dec 1978	Schladming, Austria	Combined
1979	28 Jan 1979	Garmisch, West Germany	Slalom
1979	28 Jan 1979	Garmisch, West Germany	Combined
1980	16 Dec 1979	Madonna di Campiglio, Italy	Combined
1983	5 Feb 1983	St. Anton, Austria	Downhill
1983	9 Feb 1983	Garmisch, West Germany	Super-G

Awards
Preceded by (Switzerland) Markus Ryffel	Swiss Sportsman of the Year; 1979	Succeeded by (Switzerland) Robert Dill-Bundi
