= Max Julen =

Swiss alpine skier (born 1961)

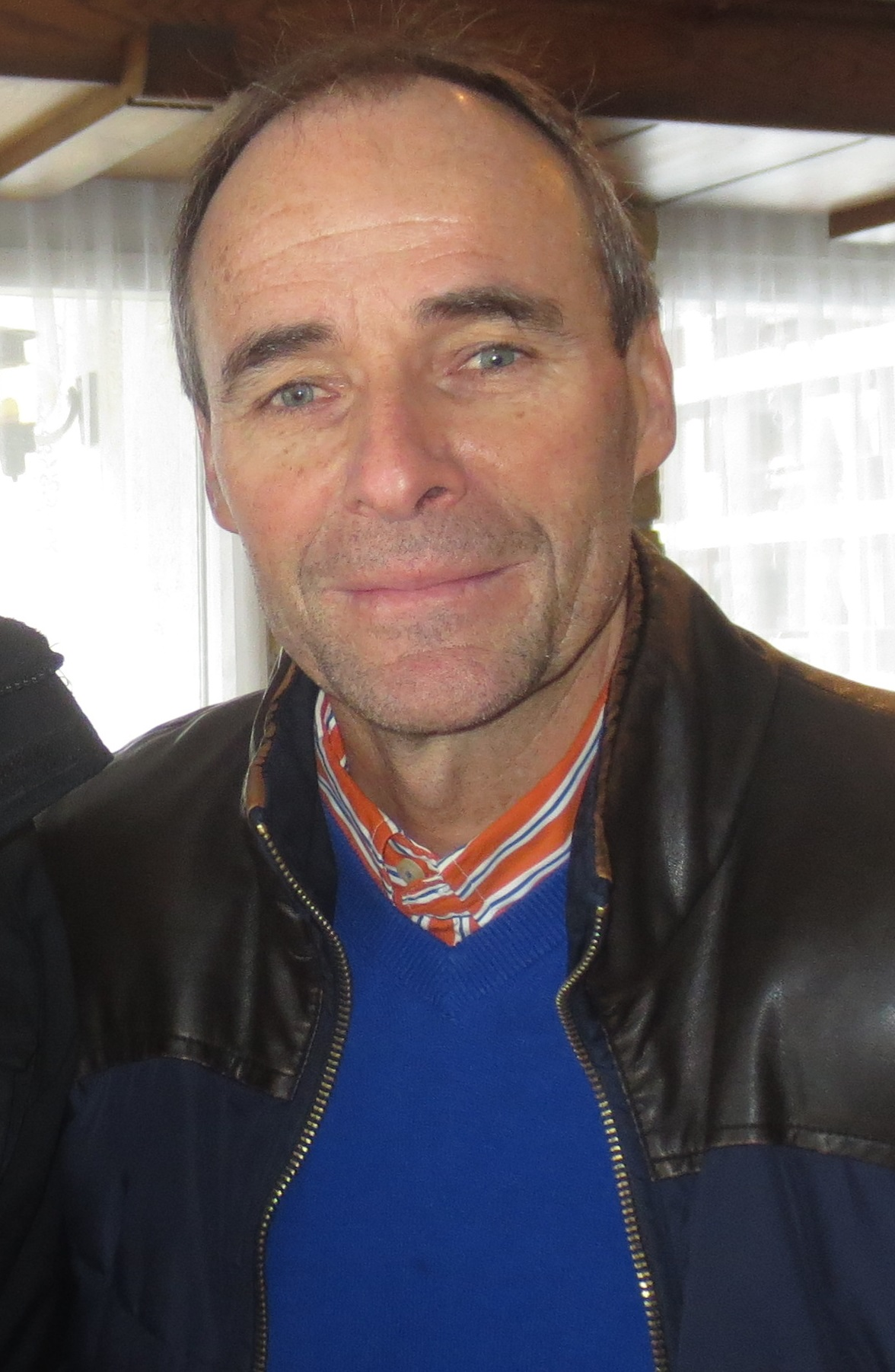
- Julen in 2014

Personal information
- Born: 15 March 1961 (age 65) Zermatt, Valais, Switzerland
- Height: 1.70 m (5 ft 7 in)
- Weight: 64 kg (141 lb)

Sport
- Country: Switzerland
- Sport: Alpine skiing
- Club: Skiclub Zermatt
Medal record
Olympic Games
Gold medal – first place	1984 Sarajevo	Giant slalom

Max Julen (born 15 March 1961) is a Swiss former alpine skier, 1984 Olympic champion in giant slalom.
