= Phil Mahre =

American alpine skier (born 1957)

Personal information
- Born: May 10, 1957 (age 69) Yakima, Washington, U.S.
- Height: 5 ft 9 in (1.75 m)
- Website: mahretrainingcenter.com

Skiing career
- Sport: Alpine skiing
- Club: White Pass
- Retired: March 1984 (age 26)
- Disciplines: Downhill, giant slalom, slalom, combined
- World Cup debut: December 5, 1975 (age 18)

Olympics
- Teams: 3 – (1976, 1980, 1984)
- Medals: 2 (1 gold)

World Championships
- Teams: 4 – (1976–82) includes two Olympics
- Medals: 2 (1 gold)

World Cup
- Seasons: 9 – (1976–84)
- Wins: 27 – (7 GS, 9 SL, 11 K)
- Podiums: 69
- Overall titles: 3 – (1981, 1982, 1983)
- Discipline titles: 7 – (2 GS, 1 SL, 4 K)
Medal record
World Cup race podiums
Event	1st	2nd	3rd
Slalom	9	7	11
Giant	7	13	6
Combined	11	1	4
Total	27	21	21
Men's alpine skiing
Representing the United States
Olympic Games
Gold medal – first place	1984 Sarajevo	Slalom
Silver medal – second place	1980 Lake Placid	Slalom
World Championships
Gold medal – first place	1980 Lake Placid	Combined

Phillip Ferdinand Mahre (born May 10, 1957) is a former World Cup alpine ski racer. Mahre competed on the World Cup circuit from 1976 to 1984. Starting with the 1978 season, Mahre finished in the top three in the World Cup overall standings for six consecutive seasons, winning the title in the final three (1981, 1982, and 1983). His total of 27 World Cup race wins is fourth among Americans, only behind Mikaela Shiffrin, Lindsey Vonn, and Bode Miller.

== Early years ==
Mahre was born in Yakima, Washington alongside his fraternal twin brother Steve (who is four minutes younger). Phil, Steve, and their seven siblings (four older, three younger) grew up at a ski area; in 1964, their father Dave "Spike" Mahre became the mountain manager for the White Pass ski area, 50 miles (80 km) west of Yakima on US-12, where they moved into a home near the base of the lifts.

By the age of 12, the Mahre twins' future was so promising that ski manufacturers were sending them free skis; the next year, Rossignol tried to sign them to a career-long contract, which their father declined. Eventually they would use skis made by an American company K2 throughout their career. The Mahre twins worked extensively with the company throughout their careers, developing custom race skis ideally suited to their needs.

Mahre graduated from Naches High School where he played football as a blocking back and linebacker for the Rangers.

== U.S. Ski Team ==
Mahre earned a spot on the U.S. Ski Team in early 1973 at age 15. He was selected to the "A" team following the 1975 season and made his World Cup debut in December 1975 at Val d'Isère, France. Two months later he competed at the 1976 Winter Olympics in Innsbruck, Austria, taking fifth in the giant slalom at age 18. He made his first podium in March with a second in a giant slalom at Copper Mountain, Colorado, and finished the 1976 World Cup season in 14th place in the overall standings. He won his first World Cup race the next season, a giant slalom at Val d'Isère in December 1976, and followed it up with a slalom win in March at Sun Valley, defeating the man who became his primary rival, the legendary Swede Ingemar Stenmark, with his twin brother Steve taking third. Mahre finished ninth in the overall standings for 1977.

In 1978 he placed second in the overall standings, followed by third in 1979, despite breaking his lower left tibia in early March at the pre-Olympic giant slalom at Whiteface near Lake Placid. At the 1980 Winter Olympics in Lake Placid, he took the silver in the slalom behind Stenmark, along with a combined title (not an Olympic event in 1980, but official as a concurrent World Championship title). He again finished third in the overall World Cup standings for 1980, and won the first of four consecutive discipline titles in the combined.

== World Cup Overall Champion (1981–83) ==
Mahre's career reached its zenith over the next three seasons. He narrowly edged out Ingemar Stenmark, who had previously won three consecutive overall titles from 1976–78, by 6 points to win his first World Cup in 1981. Mahre won primarily due to his results in the downhill and combined events, as Stenmark was uncomfortable in the downhill event. In 1982, Mahre took the event titles in the giant slalom, slalom, and combined races as well as the overall title. He had eight wins and 20 podium finishes, and his 309 points were well ahead of Stenmark's 211. In 1983, Mahre again beat Stenmark by a large margin for the overall title along with a second straight GS title.

== 1984 Olympics ==
At the 1984 Winter Olympics in Sarajevo, Mahre again medaled in the slalom, taking the gold while Steve won the silver for a Mahre twin 1–2 sweep. Steve had led the first of two runs, building a half-second lead over Swede Jonas Nilsson with Phil in third place another two-tenths back. Phil skied a second run to grab the lead, then Nilsson skied next and faltered, dropping out of the medals. Steve skied down last, needing only a solid run to take the gold, but a series of mistakes dropped him into second place, and Phil became the Olympic champion. Meanwhile, unknown to the racers, Phil's wife Holly had given birth to their second child, a son, in Arizona an hour before the race started. Phil did not find out about it until a TV interview after the race.

The Mahres won two of the five alpine skiing medals taken by Americans, all from the Northwest. Portland's Bill Johnson (downhill) and Seattle's Debbie Armstrong also won gold, and Christin Cooper of Sun Valley took the silver for an American 1–2 finish in the women's giant slalom.

The Mahre twins raced a limited World Cup schedule during the 1984 season, and retired from the circuit in early March at age 26. Phil ended his career with 27 World Cup race victories, at the time second only to Stenmark's 79 wins among men's racers (who ended his career in 1989 with 86 wins), while Steve finished with 9 wins.

== Post-retirement ==
In 1985, Phil and his brother released their book No Hill Too Fast, which chronicles their childhood and World Cup careers and includes a series of instructional sections titled "How to Ski the Mahre Way". That same year the twins established the Mahre Training Center in Keystone, Colorado, and continue to run it to this day in Deer Valley, Utah. In 1988 Phil jumped to the World Pro Ski Tour, winning the slalom title in 1989. Both he and his brother Steve raced on the World Pro Ski Tour under the Coors Light banner.

The twins attended the Bob Bondurant School of Driving in the fall of 1988 and began competing in auto racing. They subsequently participated in the Grand American Road Racing Association Koni Challenge series in the Grand Sport class.

On February 9, 2010, Mahre was the U.S. torch bearer to carry the 2010 Vancouver torch across the border at the Blaine-Surrey Peace Arch.

== Comeback ==
In 2006, at the age of 49, Phil Mahre came out of retirement and made another run at qualifying for the U.S. Nationals by the age of 50. After nearly qualifying for the U.S. National Championships in 2008, Phil Mahre's 2008–09 season was cut short by a knee injury.

A longtime racer on K2 skis during his World Cup career, Mahre attempted to make his comeback using Volant, then Head skis.

== World Cup results ==
=== Season standings ===
Season	Age	Overall	Slalom	Giant slalom	Super-G	Downhill	Combined
1976	18	14	7	10	—N/a	—	—
1977	19	9	12	4	—N/a	—	not awarded
1978	20	2	3	3	—N/a	—	not awarded
1979	21	3	2	18	—N/a	—	not awarded
1980	22	3	12	9	—N/a	—	1
1981	23	1	2	3	—N/a	32	1
1982	24	1	1	1	—N/a	26	1
1983	25	1	6	1	not awarded	18	1
1984	26	15	9	19	not awarded	39	11

Points were only awarded for top ten finishes thru 1979, top 15 thru 1991 (see scoring system).

=== Season titles ===
10 titles: 3 overall,
2 giant slalom, 1 slalom,
4, unofficial, combined

Season	Discipline
1980	Combined
1981	Overall
1981	Combined
1982	Overall
1982	Giant slalom
1982	Slalom
1982	Combined
1983	Overall
1983	Giant slalom
1983	Combined

=== Individual races ===
- 27 wins: 7 giant slalom, 9 slalom, 11 combined
- 69 podiums

Season	Date	Location	Discipline
1977	1976-Dec-10	Val d'Isère, France	Giant slalom
1977	1977-Mar-05	(United States) Sun Valley, ID, USA	Slalom
1978	1978-Feb-12	Chamonix, France	Slalom
1978	1978-Mar-03	(United States) Stratton Mountain, VT, USA	Giant slalom
1979	1979-Jan-15	Crans-Montana, Switzerland	Combined
1979	1979-Feb-05	Jasná, Czechoslovakia	Slalom
1980	1979-Dec-08	Val d'Isère, France	Combined
1981	1981-Jan-10	Morzine, France	Combined
1981	1981-Jan-17	Oberstaufen, West Germany	Combined
1981	1981-Feb-01	St. Anton, Austria	Combined
1981	1981-Feb-15	Åre, Sweden	Slalom
1981	1981-Mar-07	(United States) Aspen, CO, USA	Giant slalom
1981	1981-Mar-15	Furano, Japan	Slalom
1982	1981-Dec-08	Aprica, Italy	Combined
1982	1981-Dec-09	Madonna di Campiglio, Italy	Slalom
1982	1981-Dec-13	Madonna di Campiglio, Italy	Combined
1982	1982-Jan-15	Bad Wiessee, West Germany	Combined
1982	1982-Jan-24	Wengen, Switzerland	Slalom
1982	1982-Mar-14	Montgenèvre, France	Slalom
1982	1982-Mar-19	(Socialist Federal Republic of Yugoslavia) Kranjska Gora, Yugoslavia	Giant slalom
1982	1982-Mar-26	Jasná, Czechoslovakia	Slalom
1983	1983-Jan-23	Kitzbühel, Austria	Combined
1983	1983-Feb-06	St. Anton, Austria	Combined
1983	1983-Feb-11	Markstein, France	Combined
1983	1983-Mar-07	(United States) Aspen, CO, USA	Giant slalom
1983	1983-Mar-08	(United States) Vail, CO, USA	Giant slalom
1983	1983-Mar-19	Furano, Japan	Giant slalom

== World championship results ==
Year	Age	Slalom	Giant slalom	Super-G	Downhill	Combined
1976	18	18	5	—N/a	—	—
1978	20	DNF1	5	—N/a	36	—
1980	22	2	10	—N/a	14	1
1982	24	DNF2	DNF1	—N/a	—	—

From 1948 through 1980, the Winter Olympics were also the World Championships for alpine skiing.
At the World Championships from 1954 through 1980, the combined was a "paper race" using the results of the three events (DH, GS, SL).

== Olympic results ==
Year	Age	Slalom	Giant slalom	Super-G	Downhill	Combined
1976	18	18	5	—N/a	—	—N/a
1980	22	2	10	—N/a	14	—N/a
1984	26	1	8	—N/a	—	—N/a

== Racing record ==
=== SCCA National Championship Runoffs ===
Year	Track	Car	Engine	Class	Finish	Start	Status
1991	Road Atlanta	Oldsmobile Cutlass	Oldsmobile	GT1	1	1	Running

== See also ==
- World Fit
- List of Olympic medalist families

== Bibliography ==
- Mahre, Phil and Steve; John Fry (1985). No Hill Too Fast. Simon & Schuster. ISBN 0-671-55706-8.
