= Zoe Haas =

Swiss alpine skier (born 1962)

Personal information
- Born: 24 January 1962 (age 63) Calgary, Alberta
- Occupation(s): alpine skier in downhill, giant slalom, and Super-G

Zoe Haas (born 24 January 1962 in Calgary, Alberta) is a Swiss former alpine skier specialising in downhill, giant slalom, and Super-G. Haas competed in the Super-G in the 1988 Calgary Olympics, placing 7th, and in the 1992 Albertville Olympics, where she came in 10th.

In World Cup skiing, she finished in the top ten 44 times and won twice. Despite start number 37, she won the first downhill race of the season in Puy Saint-Vincent (1984). She was declared the winner of the super-G at Lech (1988) after the first-place finisher was disqualified. In her last World Cup race, the super-G in Crans-Montana in March 1992, she finished in third place behind Carole Merle and Merete Fjeldavlie.
