= Heidi Wiesler =

German alpine skier (born 1960)

Heidi Wiesler (born 28 March 1960 in Staufen im Breisgau) is a German former alpine skier who competed in the 1984 Winter Olympics.
