= Anne-Flore Rey =

French alpine skier (born 1962)

Anne-Flore Rey (born 2 February 1962) is a French former alpine skier who competed in the 1980 Winter Olympics and 1984 Winter Olympics.
