= Laurie Graham (skier) =

Canadian alpine skier (born 1960)

Personal information
- Born: March 30, 1960 (age 66) Inglewood, Ontario, Canada

Skiing career
- Sport: Alpine skiing
- Disciplines: Speed events

World Championships
- Medals: 1

World Cup
- Wins: 6
- Podiums: 15
Medal record
Women's alpine skiing
Representing Canada
World Cup race podiums
| Event | 1st | 2nd | 3rd |
|---|---|---|---|
| Downhill | 5 | 4 | 5 |
| Super-G | 1 | 0 | 0 |
| Total | 6 | 4 | 5 |
International competitions
| Event | 1st | 2nd | 3rd |
|---|---|---|---|
| World Championships | 0 | 0 | 1 |

Laurie Graham, CM (born March 30, 1960) is a former Canadian downhill skier.

== Career ==
She represented Canada at the 1980, 1984 and 1988 Winter Olympics. She won six World Cup victories and three National Downhill titles in her eleven years on the National Ski Team. She was the first North American woman to win a World Cup Super Giant Slalom skiing. She was the first North American to win on home soil at Mont-Tremblant, Quebec. In addition, Graham posted 34 top 10 FIS World Cup Downhill results.

In 1998, she was made a Member of the Order of Canada. She was inducted to the Canadian Ski Hall of Fame in 1991, the Canada's Sports Hall of Fame in 1993., and the Ontario Sports Hall of Fame in 2015. In 2024 she was inducted into the Caledon Sports Hall of Fame. She graduated from the University of Toronto Schools.
