= 1982 Alpine Skiing World Cup – Women's slalom =

1982 Women's slalom World Cup
Previous: 1981	Next: 1983

Women's slalom World Cup 1981/1982

== Calendar ==
Round	Race No	Place	Country	Date	Winner	Second	Third
1	3	Piancavallo	Italy	December 12, 1981	(Liechtenstein) Hanni Wenzel	(Switzerland) Erika Hess	(Liechtenstein) Ursula Konzett
2	4	Piancavallo	Italy	December 13, 1981	(Switzerland) Erika Hess	(Liechtenstein) Hanni Wenzel	(Italy) Maria Rosa Quario
3	8	St. Gervais	France	December 21, 1981	(Switzerland) Erika Hess	(Austria) Anni Kronbichler	(Liechtenstein) Ursula Konzett
4	11	Maribor	Yugoslavia	January 3, 1982	(Switzerland) Erika Hess	(Italy) Maria Rosa Quario	(Czechoslovakia) Olga Charvátová
5	18	Badgastein	Austria	January 20, 1982	(Switzerland) Erika Hess	(Liechtenstein) Ursula Konzett	(France) Fabienne Serrat
6	20	Lenggries	West Germany	January 22, 1982	(Liechtenstein) Ursula Konzett	(Austria) Anni Kronbichler	(Switzerland) Erika Hess
7	21	Berchtesgaden	West Germany	January 23, 1982	(United States) Christin Cooper	(France) Perrine Pelen	(Liechtenstein) Ursula Konzett
8	26	Waterville Valley	United States	March 3, 1982	(Liechtenstein) Ursula Konzett	(Italy) Maria Rosa Quario	(United States) Tamara McKinney
9	29	Alpe d'Huez	France	March 21, 1982	(Switzerland) Erika Hess	(Italy) Daniela Zini	(United States) Tamara McKinney
10	31	Montgènevre	France	March 27, 1982	(United States) Christin Cooper	(West Germany) Maria Epple	(Poland) Dorota Tlałka

== Final point standings ==
In women's slalom World Cup 1981/82 the best 5 results count.

Place	Name	Country	Total points	Deduction	3 (Italy)	4 (Italy)	8 (France)	11 (Socialist Federal Republic of Yugoslavia)	18 (Austria)	20 (Germany)	21 (Germany)	26 (United States)	29 (France)	31 (France)
1	Erika Hess	Switzerland	125	(35)	(20)	25	25	25	25	(15)	-	-	25	-
2	Ursula Konzett	Liechtenstein	100	(22)	15	-	15	-	20	25	(15)	25	(7)	-
3	Christin Cooper	United States	83	(10)	10	-	(10)	11	12	-	25	-	-	25
4	Maria Rosa Quario	Italy	78	(17)	11	15	(11)	20	-	-	(6)	20	12	-
5	Perrine Pelen	France	67	(11)	12	11	12	12	-	(11)	20	-	-	-
6	Daniela Zini	Italy	66	(25)	(6)	12	(2)	(10)	11	(7)	11	12	20	-
7	Anni Kronbichler	Austria	59	(3)	8	6	20	5	(3)	20	-	-	-	-
8	Maria Epple	West Germany	56		-	-	-	-	10	10	-	8	8	20
9	Hanni Wenzel	Liechtenstein	45		25	20	-	-	-	-	-	-	-	-
10	Petra Wenzel	Liechtenstein	43	(5)	-	-	7	-	5	8	12	-	11	(5)
	Małgorzata Tlałka	Poland	43	(4)	-	7	9	-	-	(4)	8	11	-	8
12	Tamara McKinney	United States	42		-	-	-	-	-	12	-	15	15	-
	Anja Zavadlav	Yugoslavia	42	(2)	-	5	8	-	8	-	(2)	-	9	12
14	Andreja Leskovšek	Yugoslavia	38	(8)	-	8	(1)	7	7	9	7	-	(5)	(2)
	Piera Macchi	Italy	38		9	-	-	9	-	-	10	-	10	-
16	Dorota Tlałka	Poland	37	(3)	6	-	4	-	-	3	9	(3)	-	15
17	Fabienne Serrat	France	36	(1)	(1)	3	-	6	15	-	-	6	6	-
18	Lea Sölkner	Austria	32		7	-	6	-	-	-	-	9	-	10
19	Roswitha Steiner	Austria	30		-	10	-	-	9	1	-	10	-	-
20	Irene Epple	West Germany	23	(2)	4	-	-	-	2	(2)	-	7	4	6
21	Olga Charvátová	Czechoslovakia	17		2	-	-	15	-	-	-	-	-	-
	Christa Kinshofer	West Germany	17		-	-	-	8	-	-	-	-	-	9
23	Lorena Frigo	Italy	16		-	-	5	-	-	-	1	-	2	8
	Ann Melander	Sweden	16		-	9	-	-	-	-	-	3	-	4
25	Cindy Nelson	United States	12		-	-	-	2	4	-	6	-	-	-
26	Brigitte Glur	Switzerland	11		-	-	-	4	2	5	-	-	-	-
	Brigitte Nansoz	Switzerland	11		-	-	-	-	-	-	-	-	-	11
28	Metka Jerman	Yugoslavia	9		-	-	-	-	-	6	-	-	-	3
29	Paola Marciandi	Italy	6		-	-	-	-	6	-	-	-	-	-
30	Sylvia Eder	Austria	5		-	2	-	3	-	-	-	-	-	-
	Heidi Preuss	United States	5		-	-	-	-	-	-	-	5	-	-
32	Nadezhda Patrakeeva Andreeva	Soviet Union	4		-	4	-	-	-	-	-	-	-	-
	Wanda Bieler	Italy	4		-	-	-	-	-	-	4	-	-	-
	Maria Walliser	Switzerland	4		-	-	-	-	-	-	-	4	-	-
	Brigitte Oertli	Switzerland	4		-	-	-	-	-	-	3	-	1	-
36	Paoletta Magoni	Italy	3		3	-	-	-	-	-	-	-	-	-
	Abbi Fisher	United States	3		-	-	3	-	-	-	-	-	-	-
28	Anne Flore Rey	France	3		-	-	-	-	-	-	-	-	3	-
39	Claudia Riedl	Austria	2		-	-	-	1	-	-	-	1	-	-
40	Ingrid Eberle	Austria	1		-	1	-	-	-	-	-	-	-	-
	Alexandra Mařasová	Czechoslovakia	1		-	-	-	-	-	-	-	-	-	1

Alpine skiing World Cup
Women

Overall | Downhill | Giant slalom | Slalom | Combined

1982
