= 1982 Alpine Skiing World Cup – Women's giant slalom =

1982 Women's giant slalom World Cup
Previous: 1981	Next: 1983

Women's giant slalom World Cup 1981/1982

== Calendar ==
Round	Race No	Place	Country	Date	Winner	Second	Third
1	1	Val d'Isère	France	December 4, 1981	(West Germany) Irene Epple	(Switzerland) Erika Hess	(United States) Tamara McKinney
2	2	Pila	Italy	December 10, 1981	(West Germany) Irene Epple	(Liechtenstein) Hanni Wenzel	(United States) Tamara McKinney
3	10	Chamonix	France	December 22, 1981	(France) Élisabeth Chaud	(West Germany) Irene Epple	(Switzerland) Erika Hess
4	12	Pfronten	West Germany	January 8, 1982	(West Germany) Irene Epple	(Switzerland) Erika Hess	(West Germany) Maria Epple
5	22	Oberstaufen	West Germany	February 9, 1982	(West Germany) Maria Epple	(United States) Christin Cooper	(Switzerland) Erika Hess
6	25	Aspen	United States	February 27, 1982	(West Germany) Maria Epple	(Switzerland) Erika Hess	(West Germany) Irene Epple
7	27	Waterville Valley	United States	March 4, 1982	(West Germany) Irene Epple	(West Germany) Maria Epple	(United States) Tamara McKinney
8	28	Alpe d'Huez	France	March 20, 1982	(Switzerland) Erika Hess	(United States) Tamara McKinney	(United States) Christin Cooper
9	30	San Sicario	Italy	March 25, 1982	(West Germany) Maria Epple	(Switzerland) Erika Hess	(United States) Christin Cooper

== Final point standings ==
In women's giant slalom World Cup 1981/82 the best 5 results count. Deductions are given in ().

Place	Name	Country	Total points	Deduction	1 (France)	2 (Italy)	10 (France)	12 (Germany)	22 (Germany)	25 (United States)	27 (United States)	28 (France)	30 (Italy)
1	Irene Epple	West Germany	120	(44)	25	25	20	25	(12)	(15)	25	(7)	(10)
2	Maria Epple	West Germany	110	(40)	(11)	(12)	(9)	15	25	25	20	(8)	25
3	Erika Hess	Switzerland	105	(53)	20	(11)	(15)	20	(15)	20	(12)	25	20
4	Tamara McKinney	United States	74		15	15	-	-	9	-	15	20	-
5	Christin Cooper	United States	68	(9)	(4)	(5)	12	-	20	-	6	15	15
6	Perrine Pelen	France	48	(9)	12	8	(4)	6	11	-	-	11	(5)
7	Cindy Nelson	United States	47	(11)	-	(2)	10	(3)	10	9	11	(6)	7
8	Ursula Konzett	Liechtenstein	37		9	-	11	12	-	-	5	-	-
	Fabienne Serrat	France	37		9	-	8	-	8	8	4	-	-
10	Maria Rosa Quario	Italy	31		10	10	-	-	-	-	7	4	-
11	Monika Hess	Switzerland	30		-	-	6	-	-	-	-	12	12
12	Ann Melander	Sweden	29		-	-	1	1	7	10	10	-	-
13	Roswitha Steiner	Austria	28	(1)	(1)	3	7	8	-	4	-	-	6
14	Hanni Wenzel	Liechtenstein	27		7	20	-	-	-	-	-	-	-
	Élisabeth Chaud	France	27		-	-	25	-	-	2	-	-	-
16	Karen Lancaster	United States	21		-	-	-	-	-	12	9	-	-
17	Elisabeth Kirchler	Austria	19		6	9	-	4	-	-	-	-	-
18	Anne Flore Rey	France	17		-	6	-	-	-	11	-	-	-
19	Olga Charvátová	Czechoslovakia	16		-	-	-	-	6	-	-	10	-
20	Traudl Hächer	West Germany	15		-	4	-	10	1	-	-	-	-
	Christa Kinshofer	West Germany	15		3	7	-	-	-	-	-	5	-
22	Zoe Haas	Switzerland	14		-	-	3	11	-	-	-	-	-
	Claudia Riedl	Austria	14		-	-	-	-	-	-	-	3	11
24	Abbi Fisher	United States	13		-	-	5	-	-	7	1	-	-
25	Petra Wenzel	Liechtenstein	12		-	-	-	9	3	-	-	-	-
	Maria Walliser	Switzerland	12		-	-	-	-	5	5	-	2	-
	Daniela Zini	Italy	12		2	-	-	-	-	-	-	9	1
28	Blanca Fernández Ochoa	Spain	11		5	1	-	-	-	3	2	-	-
29	Heidi Preuss	United States	10		-	-	-	-	2	-	8	-	-
30	Metka Jerman	Yugoslavia	9		-	-	-	-	-	6	3	-	-
	Ida Ladstätter	Austria	9		-	-	-	-	-	-	-	-	9
32	Nuša Tome	Yugoslavia	8		-	-	-	-	-	-	-	-	8
33	Diane Haight	Canada	7		-	-	-	7	-	-	-	-	-
34	Linda Rocchetti	Italy	5		-	-	-	5	-	-	-	-	-
35	Andreja Leskovšek	Yugoslavia	4		-	-	-	-	4	-	-	-	-
	Françoise Bozon	France	4		-	-	-	-	-	-	-	-	4
37	Caherine Andeer	Switzerland	3		-	-	-	-	-	-	-	-	3
38	Carole Merle	France	2		-	-	2	-	-	-	-	-	-
	Michaela Gerg	West Germany	2		-	-	-	2	-	-	-	-	-
	Sigrid Wolf	Austria	2		-	-	-	-	-	-	-	-	2
41	Paola Marciandi	Italy	1		-	-	-	-	-	1	-	-	-
	Anni Kronbichler	Austria	1		-	-	-	-	-	-	-	1	-

Alpine skiing World Cup
Women

Overall | Downhill | Giant slalom | Slalom | Combined

1982
