= 1981–82 FIS Alpine Ski World Cup =

International sports competition

FIS Alpine Ski World Cup 1981/82
Discipline	Men	Women
Overall	(United States) Phil Mahre	(Switzerland) Erika Hess
Downhill	(Canada) Steve Podborski	(France) Marie-Cécile Gros-Gaudenier
Giant slalom	(United States) Phil Mahre	(West Germany) Irene Epple
Slalom	(United States) Phil Mahre	(Switzerland) Erika Hess
Combined	(United States) Phil Mahre	(West Germany) Irene Epple
Nations Cup	Austria	West Germany
- Nations Cup overall: Switzerland

Competition
Locations	20	19
Individual	33	31

The 16th World Cup season began in December 1981 in France and concluded in March 1982, also in France. Phil Mahre of the US repeated as overall champion, the second of his three consecutive titles. Erika Hess of Switzerland won the women's overall title.

A break in the schedule was for the 1982 World Championships, held in Schladming, Austria, between January 28 and February 7, 1982. The women's races were held in Haus im Ennstal.

== Calendar ==
=== Men ===
Event key: DH – Downhill, SL – Slalom, GS – Giant slalom, KB – Combined, PS – Parallel slalom (Nations Cup ranking only)
Race	Season	Date	Place	Type	Winner	Second	Third
381	1	6 December 1981	(France) Val d'Isère	DH _{113}	(Austria) Franz Klammer	(Switzerland) Peter Müller	(Switzerland) Toni Bürgler
382	2	8 December 1981	(Italy) Aprica	GS _{121}	(Switzerland) Joël Gaspoz	(United States) Phil Mahre	(Sweden) Ingemar Stenmark
383	3	6 December 1981; 8 December 1981	(France) Val d'Isère (DH) (Italy) Aprica (GS)	KB _{023}	(United States) Phil Mahre	(Liechtenstein) Andreas Wenzel	(Austria) Leonhard Stock
384	4	9 December 1981	(Italy) Madonna di Campiglio	SL _{126}	(United States) Phil Mahre	(Sweden) Ingemar Stenmark	(Italy) Paolo De Chiesa
385	5	13 December 1981	(Italy) Val Gardena	DH _{114}	(Austria) Erwin Resch	(United Kingdom) Konrad Bartelski	(Austria) Leonhard Stock
386	6	9 December 1981; 13 December 1981	(Italy) Madonna di Campiglio (SL) (Italy) Val Gardena (DH)	KB _{024}	(United States) Phil Mahre	(Liechtenstein) Andreas Wenzel	(Norway) Even Hole
387	7	14 December 1981	(Italy) Cortina d'Ampezzo	SL _{127}	(United States) Steve Mahre	(United States) Phil Mahre	(Sweden) Ingemar Stenmark
388	8	15 December 1981	(Italy) Cortina d'Ampezzo	GS _{122}	(Socialist Federal Republic of Yugoslavia) Boris Strel	(United States) Phil Mahre	(Switzerland) Joël Gaspoz
389	9	21 December 1981	(Switzerland) Crans-Montana	DH _{115}	(Canada) Steve Podborski	(Switzerland) Peter Müller	(Canada) Ken Read
390	10	9 January 1982	(France) Morzine	GS _{123}	(Sweden) Ingemar Stenmark	(United States) Phil Mahre	(Luxembourg) Marc Girardelli
391	11	12 January 1982	(West Germany) Bad Wiessee	SL _{128}	(Sweden) Ingemar Stenmark	(Austria) Franz Gruber	(United States) Phil Mahre
392	12	15 January 1982	(Austria) Kitzbühel	DH _{116}	(Austria) Harti Weirather	(Canada) Steve Podborski	(Canada) Ken Read
393	13	12 January 1982; 15 January 1982	(West Germany) Bad Wiessee (SL) (Austria) Kitzbühel (DH)	KB _{025}	(United States) Phil Mahre	(Liechtenstein) Andreas Wenzel	(West Germany) Peter Roth
394	14	16 January 1982	(Austria) Kitzbühel	DH _{117}	(Canada) Steve Podborski	(Austria) Franz Klammer	(Canada) Ken Read
395	15	17 January 1982	(Austria) Kitzbühel	SL _{129}	(Sweden) Ingemar Stenmark	(United States) Phil Mahre	(Italy) Paolo De Chiesa (United States) Steve Mahre
396	16	19 January 1982	(Switzerland) Adelboden	GS _{124}	(Sweden) Ingemar Stenmark	(United States) Phil Mahre	(Switzerland) Max Julen
397	17	23 January 1982	(Switzerland) Wengen	DH _{118}	(Austria) Harti Weirather	(Austria) Erwin Resch	(Austria) Peter Wirnsberger
398	18	24 January 1982	(Switzerland) Wengen	SL _{130}	(United States) Phil Mahre	(Sweden) Ingemar Stenmark	(Liechtenstein) Paul Frommelt
399	19	24 January 1982	(Switzerland) Wengen	KB _{026}	(Switzerland) Pirmin Zurbriggen	(Czechoslovakia) Ivan Pacak	(Italy) Thomas Kemenater
1982 World Championships (28 January–7 February)
400	20	9 February 1982	(Austria) Kirchberg	GS _{125}	(Sweden) Ingemar Stenmark	(United States) Phil Mahre	(Luxembourg) Marc Girardelli
401	21	13 February 1982	(West Germany) Garmisch	DH _{119}	(Canada) Steve Podborski	(Switzerland) Conradin Cathomen	(Austria) Harti Weirather
402	22	14 February 1982	(West Germany) Garmisch	SL _{131}	(United States) Steve Mahre	(United States) Phil Mahre	(Italy) Paolo De Chiesa
403	23	14 February 1982	(West Germany) Garmisch	KB _{027}	(United States) Steve Mahre	(France) Michel Vion	(Switzerland) Peter Lüscher
404	24	27 February 1982	(Canada) Whistler Mountain	DH _{120}	(Switzerland) Peter Müller	(Canada) Steve Podborski	(Canada) Dave Irwin
405	25	5 March 1982	(United States) Aspen	DH _{121}	(Switzerland) Peter Müller	(Austria) Harti Weirather	(Switzerland) Conradin Cathomen
406	26	6 March 1982	(United States) Aspen	DH _{122}	(Switzerland) Peter Müller	(Canada) Todd Brooker	(Austria) Helmut Höflehner
407	27	13 March 1982	(Czechoslovakia) Jasná	GS _{126}	(United States) Steve Mahre	(Austria) Hans Enn	(United States) Phil Mahre
408	28	14 March 1982	(Czechoslovakia) Jasná	SL _{132}	(United States) Phil Mahre	(Sweden) Ingemar Stenmark	(Austria) Anton Steiner (United States) Steve Mahre
409	29	17 March 1982	(Austria) Bad Kleinkirchheim	GS _{127}	(United States) Steve Mahre	(United States) Phil Mahre	(Switzerland) Pirmin Zurbriggen
410	30	19 March 1982	(Socialist Federal Republic of Yugoslavia) Kranjska Gora	GS _{128}	(United States) Phil Mahre	(Austria) Hans Enn	(Luxembourg) Marc Girardelli
411	31	20 March 1982	(Socialist Federal Republic of Yugoslavia) Kranjska Gora	SL _{133}	(Socialist Federal Republic of Yugoslavia) Bojan Križaj	(Sweden) Ingemar Stenmark	(Austria) Franz Gruber
412	32	24 March 1982	(Italy) San Sicario	GS _{129}	(Switzerland) Pirmin Zurbriggen	(Luxembourg) Marc Girardelli	(United States) Phil Mahre
413	33	26 March 1982	(France) Montgenèvre	SL _{134}	(United States) Phil Mahre	(Sweden) Ingemar Stenmark	(Switzerland) Joël Gaspoz
Nations Cup		28 March 1982	(France) Montgenèvre	PS _{ncr}	(United States) Phil Mahre	(Sweden) Ingemar Stenmark	(Austria) Hans Enn

=== Women ===
Event key: DH – Downhill, SL – Slalom, GS – Giant slalom, KB – Combined, PS – Parallel slalom (Nations Cup ranking only)
Race	Season	Date	Place	Type	Winner	Second	Third
360	1	4 December 1981	(France) Val d'Isère	GS _{114}	(West Germany) Irene Epple	(Switzerland) Erika Hess	(United States) Tamara McKinney
361	2	10 December 1981	(Italy) Pila	GS _{115}	(West Germany) Irene Epple	(Liechtenstein) Hanni Wenzel	(United States) Tamara McKinney
362	3	12 December 1981	(Italy) Piancavallo	SL _{125}	(Liechtenstein) Hanni Wenzel	(Switzerland) Erika Hess	(Liechtenstein) Ursula Konzett
363	4	13 December 1981	(Italy) Piancavallo	SL _{126}	(Switzerland) Erika Hess	(Liechtenstein) Hanni Wenzel	(Italy) Maria Rosa Quario
364	5	18 December 1981	(Austria) Saalbach	DH _{100}	(France) Marie-Cécile Gros-Gaudenier	(Switzerland) Doris de Agostini	(Austria) Sigrid Wolf
365	6	4 December 1981; 18 December 1981	(France) Val d'Isère (GS) (Austria) Saalbach (DH)	KB _{023}	(West Germany) Irene Epple	(Switzerland) Erika Hess	(West Germany) Christa Kinshofer
	7	19 December 1981	(Austria) Saalbach	DH _{101}	(Switzerland) Doris de Agostini	(France) Marie-Cécile Gros-Gaudenier	(West Germany) Irene Epple
367	8	21 December 1981	(France) St. Gervais	SL _{127}	(Switzerland) Erika Hess	(Austria) Anni Kronbichler	(Liechtenstein) Ursula Konzett
368	9	19 December 1981; 21 December 1981	(Austria) Saalbach (DH) (France) St. Gervais (SL)	KB _{024}	(United States) Christin Cooper	(Austria) Lea Sölkner	(West Germany) Irene Epple
369	10	22 December 1981	(France) Chamonix	GS _{116}	(France) Élisabeth Chaud	(West Germany) Irene Epple	(Switzerland) Erika Hess
370	11	3 January 1982	(Socialist Federal Republic of Yugoslavia) Maribor	SL _{128}	(Switzerland) Erika Hess	(Italy) Maria Rosa Quario	(Czechoslovakia) Olga Charvátová
371	12	8 January 1982	(West Germany) Pfronten	GS _{117}	(West Germany) Irene Epple	(Switzerland) Erika Hess	(West Germany) Maria Epple
372	13	13 January 1982	(Switzerland) Grindelwald	DH _{102}	(Canada) Gerry Sorensen	(France) Marie-Cécile Gros-Gaudenier	(France) Élisabeth Chaud
373	14	14 January 1982	(Switzerland) Grindelwald	DH _{103}	(Canada) Gerry Sorensen	(West Germany) Irene Epple	(United States) Cindy Nelson
374	15	8 January 1982; 14 January 1982	(West Germany) Pfronten (GS) (Switzerland) Grindelwald (DH)	KB _{025}	(West Germany) Irene Epple	(Switzerland) Erika Hess	(United States) Cindy Nelson
375	16	18 January 1982	(Austria) Bad Gastein	DH _{104}	(United States) Holly Flanders	(Austria) Lea Sölkner	(Austria) Sylvia Eder
376	17	19 January 1982	(Austria) Bad Gastein	DH _{105}	(Austria) Sylvia Eder	(France) Élisabeth Chaud	(United States) Holly Flanders
377	18	20 January 1982	(Austria) Bad Gastein	SL _{129}	(Switzerland) Erika Hess	(Liechtenstein) Ursula Konzett	(France) Fabienne Serrat
378	19	20 January 1982	(Austria) Bad Gastein	KB _{026}	(Switzerland) Erika Hess	(West Germany) Irene Epple	(Austria) Lea Sölkner
379	20	22 January 1982	(West Germany) Lenggries	SL _{130}	(Liechtenstein) Ursula Konzett	(Austria) Anni Kronbichler	(Switzerland) Erika Hess
380	21	23 January 1982	(West Germany) Berchtesgaden	SL _{131}	(United States) Christin Cooper	(France) Perrine Pelen	(Liechtenstein) Ursula Konzett
1982 World Championships (28 January–7 February)
381	22	9 February 1982	(Germany) Oberstaufen	GS _{118}	(West Germany) Maria Epple	(United States) Christin Cooper	(Switzerland) Erika Hess
382	23	13 February 1982	(Switzerland) Arosa	DH _{106}	(United States) Holly Flanders	(United States) Cindy Nelson	(Switzerland) Maria Walliser
383	24	14 February 1982	(Switzerland) Arosa	DH _{107}	(Switzerland) Doris de Agostini	(Switzerland) Maria Walliser	(Canada) Gerry Sorensen
384	25	27 February 1982	(United States) Aspen	GS _{119}	(West Germany) Maria Epple	(Switzerland) Erika Hess	(West Germany) Irene Epple
385	26	3 March 1982	(United States) Waterville Valley	SL _{132}	(Liechtenstein) Ursula Konzett	(Italy) Maria Rosa Quario	(United States) Tamara McKinney
386	27	4 March 1982	(United States) Waterville Valley	GS _{120}	(West Germany) Irene Epple	(West Germany) Maria Epple	(United States) Tamara McKinney
387	28	20 March 1982	(France) Alpe d'Huez	GS _{121}	(Switzerland) Erika Hess	(United States) Tamara McKinney	(United States) Christin Cooper
388	29	21 March 1982	(France) Alpe d'Huez	SL _{133}	(Switzerland) Erika Hess	(Italy) Daniela Zini	(United States) Tamara McKinney
389	30	25 March 1982	(Italy) San Sicario	GS _{122}	(West Germany) Maria Epple	(Switzerland) Erika Hess	(United States) Christin Cooper
390	31	27 March 1982	(France) Montgenèvre	SL _{134}	(United States) Christin Cooper	(West Germany) Maria Epple	(Poland) Dorota Tlałka
Nations Cup		28 March 1982	(France) Montgenèvre	PS _{ncp}	(West Germany) Maria Epple	(Austria) Lea Sölkner	(France) Perrine Pelen

== Men ==
=== Overall ===
see complete table

For the 1982 overall title, the best five downhills, best five giant slaloms, best five slaloms and best three combined counted. Thirty racers had a point deduction.

Place	Name	Country	Total	DH	GS	SL	KB
1	Phil Mahre	United States	309	9	105	120	75
2	Ingemar Stenmark	Sweden	211	0	101	110	0
3	Steve Mahre	United States	183	0	66	92	25
4	Peter Müller	Switzerland	132	115	0	0	17
5	Andreas Wenzel	Liechtenstein	128	0	36	32	60
6	Marc Girardelli	Luxembourg	121	0	77	44	0
7	Joël Gaspoz	Switzerland	119	0	70	49	0
8	Steve Podborski	Canada	115	115	0	0	0
9	Bojan Križaj	Yugoslavia	108	0	45	63	0
10	Harti Weirather	Austria	97	97	0	0	0
11	Pirmin Zurbriggen	Switzerland	96	0	67	4	25
12	Erwin Resch	Austria	76	76	0	0	0
13	Hans Enn	Austria	75	0	75	0	0
14	Franz Klammer	Austria	71	71	0	0	0
15	Franz Gruber	Austria	69	0	3	66	0
16	Paolo De Chiesa	Italy	68	0	0	68	0
17	Ken Read	Canada	65	65	0	0	0
18	Leonhard Stock	Austria	64	49	0	0	15
19	Jacques Lüthy	Switzerland	63	0	33	30	0
20	Hubert Strolz	Austria	59	0	44	15	0

=== Downhill ===
see complete table

In men's downhill World Cup 1981/82 the best 5 results count. 14 racers had a point deduction, which are given in (). The same tie-breaking rule in effect in 1977 (which awarded Heini Hemmi a discipline title over Ingemar Stenmark) were still in effect—best sixth score. Thus, Canada's Steve Podborski was awarded the season title and discipline trophy over two-time winner Peter Müller by having a better sixth score (12, for a fourth-place finish, compared to 10, for a sixth-place finish).

Place	Name	Country	Total	1 (France)	5 (Italy)	9 (Switzerland)	12 (Austria)	14 (Austria)	17 (Switzerland)	21 (Germany)	24 (Canada)	25 (United States)	26 (United States)
1	Steve Podborski	Canada	115	(12)	(12)	25	20	25	(5)	25	20	(2)	(2)
2	Peter Müller	Switzerland	115	20	-	20	(10)	-	(7)	(10)	25	25	25
3	Harti Weirather	Austria	97	(8)	(5)	(11)	25	(9)	25	15	-	20	12
4	Erwin Resch	Austria	76	9	25	-	12	10	20	-	(5)	-	(4)
5	Franz Klammer	Austria	71	25	9	-	5	20	12	-	(4)	-	-
6	Ken Read	Canada	65	11	-	15	15	15	-	-	9	(8)	-
7	Toni Bürgler	Switzerland	54	15	7	(7)	11	11	(2)	-	10	-	-
8	Peter Wirnsberger	Austria	53	10	8	12	(4)	(1)	15	(5)	8	(1)	-
9	Helmut Höflehner	Austria	51	(2)	-	-	8	(4)	8	9	-	11	15
10	Franz Heinzer	Switzerland	50	-	(1)	10	(6)	12	11	7	-	10	-

=== Giant slalom ===
see complete table

In men's giant slalom World Cup 1981/82 the best 5 results count. 10 racers had a point deduction, which are given in (). Phil Mahre won the cup with only one win.

Place	Name	Country	Total	2 (Italy)	8 (Italy)	10 (France)	16 (Switzerland)	20 (Austria)	27 (Czechoslovakia)	29 (Austria)	30 (Socialist Federal Republic of Yugoslavia)	32 (Italy)
1	Phil Mahre	United States	105	20	20	20	20	(20)	(15)	(20)	25	(15)
2	Ingemar Stenmark	Sweden	101	15	(9)	25	25	25	(10)	-	-	11
3	Marc Girardelli	Luxembourg	77	-	12	15	-	15	-	(12)	15	20
4	Hans Enn	Austria	75	-	-	-	-	12	20	11	20	12
5	Joël Gaspoz	Switzerland	70	25	15	8	(7)	(5)	(6)	-	12	10
6	Pirmin Zurbriggen	Switzerland	67	(6)	10	-	9	8	(8)	15	(6)	25
7	Steve Mahre	United States	66	8	-	-	-	2	25	25	-	6
8	Bojan Križaj	Yugoslavia	45	11	12	-	-	7	11	4	(3)	-
9	Hubert Strolz	Austria	44	-	-	11	12	-	12	-	-	9
10	Jean-Luc Fournier	Switzerland	43	12	-	6	6	-	9	10	(5)	-
11	Andreas Wenzel	Liechtenstein	36	5	8	-	-	-	(4)	8	8	7
12	Wolfram Ortner	Austria	34	-	5	-	8	11	(1)	3	7	-
13	Jacques Lüthy	Switzerland	33	-	3	-	10	-	7	5	-	8
14	Boris Strel	Yugoslavia	29	-	25	-	-	4	-	-	-	-

=== Slalom ===
see complete table

In men's slalom World Cup 1981/82 the best 5 results count. 8 racers had a point deduction, which are given in ().

Place	Name	Country	Total	4 (Italy)	7 (Italy)	11 (Germany)	15 (Austria)	18 (Switzerland)	22 (Germany)	28 (Czechoslovakia)	31 (Socialist Federal Republic of Yugoslavia)	33 (France)
1	Phil Mahre	United States	120	25	20	(15)	(20)	25	(20)	25	-	25
2	Ingemar Stenmark	Sweden	110	20	(15)	25	25	20	-	20	(20)	(20)
3	Steve Mahre	United States	92	(5)	25	-	15	12	25	15	-	-
4	Paolo De Chiesa	Italy	68	15	11	12	15	(8)	15	-	-	-
5	Franz Gruber	Austria	66	(9)	10	20	-	-	12	-	15	9
6	Bojan Križaj	Yugoslavia	63	4	-	(4)	-	11	-	11	25	12
7	Joël Gaspoz	Switzerland	49	2	12	-	-	-	8	-	12	15
8	Paul Frommelt	Liechtenstein	44	12	-	8	9	15	-	-	-	-
	Marc Girardelli	Luxembourg	44	6	9	(6)	-	9	-	9	11	-
10	Stig Strand	Sweden	39	8	-	-	8	6	-	(6)	9	8

=== Combined ===
see complete table

In men's Combined World Cup 1981/82 all 5 results count. Phil Mahre won his third Combined World Cup in a row.

Place	Name	Country	Total	3 (France) (Italy)	6 (Italy)	13 (Germany) (Austria)	19 (Switzerland)	23 (Germany)
1	Phil Mahre	United States	75	25	25	25	-	-
2	Andreas Wenzel	Liechtenstein	60	20	20	20	-	-
3	Even Hole	Norway	42	5	15	-	12	10
4	Hubertus von Hohenlohe	Mexico	38	3	11	9	9	6
5	Michel Vion	France	28	8	-	-	-	20
	Klaus Gattermann	West Germany	28	4	12	-	-	12
7	Pirmin Zurbriggen	Switzerland	25	-	-	-	25	-
	Steve Mahre	United States	25	-	-	-	-	25
9	Peter Lüscher	Switzerland	24	9	-	-	-	15
10	Scott Sánchez	Bolivia	21	-	-	10	11	-

== Women ==
=== Overall ===
see complete table

In women's overall World Cup 1981/82 the best five downhills, best five giant slaloms, best five slaloms and best three combined count. 25 racers had a point deduction.

Place	Name	Country	Total	DH	GS	SL	KB
1	Erika Hess	Switzerland	297	2	105	125	65
2	Irene Epple	West Germany	282	69	120	23	70
3	Christin Cooper	United States	198	10	68	83	37
4	Maria Epple	West Germany	166	0	110	56	0
5	Cindy Nelson	United States	158	61	47	12	38
6	Ursula Konzett	Liechtenstein	137	0	37	100	0
	Lea Sölkner	Austria	137	64	0	32	41
8	Perrine Pelen	France	125	0	48	67	10
9	Tamara McKinney	United States	116	0	74	42	0
10	Maria Rosa Quario	Italy	109	0	31	78	0
11	Élisabeth Chaud	France	98	59	27	0	12
12	Holly Flanders	United States	90	84	0	0	6
	Gerry Sorensen	Canada	90	81	0	0	9
14	Daniela Zini	Italy	88	0	12	66	10
15	Marie-Cécile Gros-Gaudenier	France	87	87	0	0	0
16	Doris de Agostini	Switzerland	84	84	0	0	0
17	Maria Walliser	Switzerland	75	59	12	4	0
18	Fabienne Serrat	France	73	0	37	36	0
19	Hanni Wenzel	Liechtenstein	72	0	27	45	0
20	Ingrid Eberle	Austria	68	50	0	1	17

=== Downhill ===
see complete table

In women's downhill World Cup 1981/82 the best 5 results count. Ten racers had a point deduction, which are given in (). Only four different venues in two different countries. Marie-Cécile Gros-Gaudenier won the cup with only one win.

Place	Name	Country	Total	5 (Austria)	7 (Austria)	13 (Switzerland)	14 (Switzerland)	16 (Austria)	17 (Austria)	23 (Switzerland)	24 (Switzerland)
1	Marie-Cécile Gros-Gaudenier	France	87	25	20	20	-	-	(3)	11	11
2	Holly Flanders	United States	84	-	-	10	9	25	15	25	-
	Doris de Agostini	Switzerland	84	20	25	5	-	(1)	9	-	25
4	Gerry Sorensen	Canada	81	(3)	8	25	25	(5)	(5)	8	15
5	Irene Epple	West Germany	69	10	15	(8)	20	12	12	-	(10)
6	Lea Sölkner	Austria	64	-	12	9	12	20	11	(7)	(4)
7	Cindy Nelson	United States	61	(1)	-	12	15	8	6	20	-
8	Maria Walliser	Switzerland	59	-	-	6	10	(6)	8	15	20
	Élisabeth Chaud	France	59	-	6	15	-	11	20	-	7
10	Ingrid Eberle	Austria	50	7	(5)	11	11	-	-	12	9
11	Sylvia Eder	Austria	45	-	-	4	1	15	25	-	-

=== Giant slalom ===
see complete table

In women's giant slalom World Cup 1981/82 the best 5 results count. Seven racers had a point deduction, which are given in (). The Epple-sisters won 7 races out of 9!

Place	Name	Country	Total	1 (France)	2 (Italy)	10 (France)	12 (Germany)	22 (Germany)	25 (United States)	27 (United States)	28 (France)	30 (Italy)
1	Irene Epple	West Germany	120	25	25	20	25	(12)	(15)	25	(7)	(10)
2	Maria Epple	West Germany	110	(11)	(12)	(9)	15	25	25	20	(8)	25
3	Erika Hess	Switzerland	105	20	(11)	(15)	20	(15)	20	(12)	25	20
4	Tamara McKinney	United States	74	15	15	-	-	9	-	15	20	-
5	Christin Cooper	United States	68	(4)	(5)	12	-	20	-	6	15	15
6	Perrine Pelen	France	48	12	8	(4)	6	11	-	-	11	(5)
7	Cindy Nelson	United States	47	-	(2)	10	(3)	10	9	11	(6)	7
8	Ursula Konzett	Liechtenstein	37	9	-	11	12	-	-	5	-	-
	Fabienne Serrat	France	37	9	-	8	-	8	8	4	-	-
10	Maria Rosa Quario	Italy	31	10	10	-	-	-	-	7	4	-
11	Monika Hess	Switzerland	30	-	-	6	-	-	-	-	12	12
12	Ann Melander	Sweden	29	-	-	1	1	7	10	10	-	-
13	Roswitha Steiner	Austria	28	(1)	3	7	8	-	4	-	-	6
14	Hanni Wenzel	Liechtenstein	27	7	20	-	-	-	-	-	-	-
	Élisabeth Chaud	France	27	-	-	25	-	-	2	-	-	-

=== Slalom ===
see complete table

In women's slalom World Cup 1981/82 the best 5 results count. 14 racers had a point deduction, which are given in (). Erika Hess won five races. She won the World Cup with maximum points.

Place	Name	Country	Total	3 (Italy)	4 (Italy)	8 (France)	11 (Socialist Federal Republic of Yugoslavia)	18 (Austria)	20 (Germany)	21 (Germany)	26 (United States)	29 (France)	31 (France)
1	Erika Hess	Switzerland	125	(20)	25	25	25	25	(15)	-	-	25	-
2	Ursula Konzett	Liechtenstein	100	15	-	15	-	20	25	(15)	25	(7)	-
3	Christin Cooper	United States	83	10	-	(10)	11	12	-	25	-	-	25
4	Maria Rosa Quario	Italy	78	11	15	(11)	20	-	-	(6)	20	12	-
5	Perrine Pelen	France	67	12	11	12	12	-	(11)	20	-	-	-
6	Daniela Zini	Italy	66	(6)	12	(2)	(10)	11	(7)	11	12	20	-
7	Anni Kronbichler	Austria	59	8	6	20	5	(3)	20	-	-	-	-
8	Maria Epple	West Germany	56	-	-	-	-	10	10	-	8	8	20
9	Hanni Wenzel	Liechtenstein	45	25	20	-	-	-	-	-	-	-	-
10	Petra Wenzel	Liechtenstein	43	-	-	7	-	5	8	12	-	11	(5)
	Małgorzata Tlałka	Poland	43	-	7	9	-	-	(4)	8	11	-	8

=== Combined ===
see complete table

In women's Combined World Cup 1981/82 all 4 results count.

Place	Name	Country	Total	6 (France) (Austria)	9 (Austria) (France)	15 (Germany) (Switzerland)	19 (Austria)
1	Irene Epple	West Germany	85	25	15	25	20
2	Erika Hess	Switzerland	77	20	12	20	25
3	Cindy Nelson	United States	43	5	11	15	12
4	Lea Sölkner	Austria	41	6	20	-	15
5	Christin Cooper	United States	37	12	25	-	-
6	Christa Kinshofer	West Germany	24	15	9	-	-
7	Zoe Haas	Switzerland	22	10	-	12	-
8	Abbi Fisher	United States	19	9	10	-	-
9	Traudl Hächer	West Germany	19	11	-	8	-
10	Elisabeth Kirchler	Austria	18	-	-	11	7

== Nations Cup ==
=== Overall ===
Place	Country	Total	Men	Women
1	Switzerland	1587	902	685
2	Austria	1502	959	543
3	United States	1314	632	682
4	West Germany	765	57	708
5	Italy	596	250	316
6	France	541	57	484
7	Canada	494	302	192
8	Liechtenstein	467	176	291
9	Sweden	423	378	45
10	Yugoslavia	298	178	120
11	Luxembourg	139	139	0
12	Norway	124	102	22
13	Soviet Union	101	95	6
14	Poland	95	0	95
15	Czechoslovakia	88	30	58
16	Mexico	38	38	0
17	Japan	33	33	0
18	United Kingdom	25	25	0
19	Bolivia	21	21	0
20	Bulgaria	17	17	0
21	Spain	11	0	11
22	Australia	8	8	0
23	Belgium	7	7	0
24	New Zealand	5	5	0

=== Men ===
Place	Country	Total	DH	GS	SL	KB	Racers	Wins
1	Austria	959	531	222	191	15	21	4
2	Switzerland	902	431	305	86	80	19	6
3	United States	632	19	241	272	100	4	13
4	Sweden	378	0	139	239	0	5	5
5	Canada	302	302	0	0	0	6	3
6	Italy	280	31	43	179	27	13	0
7	Yugoslavia	178	0	108	70	0	4	2
8	Liechtenstein	176	0	40	76	60	2	0
9	Luxembourg	139	0	89	50	0	1	0
10	Norway	102	0	30	30	42	4	0
11	Soviet Union	95	39	20	13	23	4	0
12	West Germany	57	0	0	3	54	5	0
	France	57	4	9	16	28	6	0
14	Mexico	38	0	0	0	38	1	0
15	Japan	33	0	0	3	30	3	0
16	Czechoslovakia	30	0	0	3	27	2	0
17	United Kingdom	25	25	0	0	0	1	0
18	Bolivia	21	0	0	0	21	1	0
19	Bulgaria	17	0	0	17	0	1	0
20	Australia	8	0	0	0	8	1	0
21	Belgium	7	0	0	0	7	1	0
22	New Zealand	5	0	0	0	5	1	0

=== Women ===
Place	Country	Total	DH	GS	SL	KB	Racers	Wins
1	West Germany	708	119	346	98	145	9	9
2	Switzerland	685	170	217	190	108	11	9
3	United States	682	169	253	155	105	9	5
4	Austria	543	245	74	132	92	12	1
5	France	484	193	144	118	29	10	2
6	Italy	316	0	49	253	14	8	0
7	Liechtenstein	291	0	76	215	0	3	3
8	Canada	192	173	7	0	12	5	2
9	Yugoslavia	120	0	21	99	0	4	0
10	Poland	95	0	0	87	8	3	0
11	Czechoslovakia	58	15	16	18	9	3	0
12	Sweden	45	0	29	16	0	1	0
13	Norway	22	22	0	0	0	1	0
14	Spain	11	0	11	0	0	1	0
15	Soviet Union	6	0	0	4	2	2	0
