= 1982 Alpine Skiing World Cup – Women's downhill =

1982 Women's downhill World Cup
| Previous: 1981 | Next: 1983 |

Women's downhill World Cup 1981/1982

== Calendar ==
| Round | Race No | Place | Country | Date | Winner | Second | Third |
|---|---|---|---|---|---|---|---|
| 1 | 5 | Saalbach-Hinterglemm | Austria | December 18, 1981 | (France) Marie-Cécile Gros-Gaudenier | (Switzerland) Doris de Agostini | (Austria) Sigrid Wolf |
| 2 | 7 | Saalbach-Hinterglemm | Austria | December 19, 1981 | (Switzerland) Doris de Agostini | (France) Marie-Cécile Gros-Gaudenier | (West Germany) Irene Epple |
| 3 | 13 | Grindelwald | Switzerland | January 13, 1982 | (Canada) Gerry Sorensen | (France) Marie-Cécile Gros-Gaudenier | (France) Élisabeth Chaud |
| 4 | 14 | Grindelwald | Switzerland | January 14, 1982 | (Canada) Gerry Sorensen | (West Germany) Irene Epple | (United States) Cindy Nelson |
| 5 | 16 | Badgastein | Austria | January 18, 1982 | (United States) Holly Flanders | (Austria) Lea Sölkner | (Austria) Sylvia Eder |
| 6 | 17 | Badgastein | Austria | January 19, 1982 | (Austria) Sylvia Eder | (France) Élisabeth Chaud | (United States) Holly Flanders |
| 7 | 23 | Arosa | Switzerland | February 13, 1982 | (United States) Holly Flanders | (United States) Cindy Nelson | (Switzerland) Maria Walliser |
| 8 | 24 | Arosa | Switzerland | February 14, 1982 | (Switzerland) Doris de Agostini | (Switzerland) Maria Walliser | (Canada) Gerry Sorensen |

== Final point standings ==
In women's downhill World Cup 1981/82 the best 5 results count. Ten racers had a point deduction, which are given in ().

| Place | Name | Country | Total points | Deduction | 5 (Austria) | 7 (Austria) | 13 (Switzerland) | 14 (Switzerland) | 16 (Austria) | 17 (Austria) | 23 (Switzerland) | 24 (Switzerland) |
|---|---|---|---|---|---|---|---|---|---|---|---|---|
| 1 | Marie-Cécile Gros-Gaudenier | France | 87 | (3) | 25 | 20 | 20 | - | - | (3) | 11 | 11 |
| 2 | Holly Flanders | United States | 84 | | - | - | 10 | 9 | 25 | 15 | 25 | - |
| | Doris de Agostini | Switzerland | 84 | (1) | 20 | 25 | 5 | - | (1) | 9 | - | 25 |
| 4 | Gerry Sorensen | Canada | 81 | (13) | (3) | 8 | 25 | 25 | (5) | (5) | 8 | 15 |
| 5 | Irene Epple | West Germany | 69 | (18) | 10 | 15 | (8) | 20 | 12 | 12 | - | (10) |
| 6 | Lea Sölkner | Austria | 64 | (11) | - | 12 | 9 | 12 | 20 | 11 | (7) | (4) |
| 7 | Cindy Nelson | United States | 61 | (1) | (1) | - | 12 | 15 | 8 | 6 | 20 | - |
| 8 | Maria Walliser | Switzerland | 59 | (6) | - | - | 6 | 10 | (6) | 8 | 15 | 20 |
| | Élisabeth Chaud | France | 59 | | - | 6 | 15 | - | 11 | 20 | - | 7 |
| 10 | Ingrid Eberle | Austria | 50 | (5) | 7 | (5) | 11 | 11 | - | - | 12 | 9 |
| 11 | Sylvia Eder | Austria | 45 | | - | - | 4 | 1 | 15 | 25 | - | - |
| 12 | Laurie Graham | Canada | 44 | (4) | 12 | (4) | - | - | 9 | 10 | 5 | 8 |
| 13 | Marie-Luce Waldmeier | France | 26 | (2) | - | (1) | (1) | 3 | 2 | 7 | 2 | 12 |
| 14 | Sigrid Wolf | Austria | 24 | | 15 | - | - | 5 | - | 4 | - | - |
| 15 | Dianne Lehodey | Canada | 22 | | 9 | 9 | - | - | 4 | - | - | - |
| | Torill Fjeldstad | Norway | 22 | | - | - | - | - | 11 | - | 6 | 5 |
| 17 | Cornelia Pröll | Austria | 16 | | - | 11 | - | - | 3 | 2 | - | - |
| 18 | Sieglinde Winkler | Austria | 15 | | - | - | - | - | - | - | 9 | 6 |
| 19 | Claudine Emonet | France | 14 | | - | - | 7 | 7 | - | - | - | - |
| 20 | Ariane Ehrat | Switzerland | 11 | | 11 | - | - | - | - | - | - | - |
| 21 | Christin Cooper | United States | 10 | | - | 10 | - | - | - | - | - | - |
| | Cindy Oak | United States | 10 | | - | - | - | - | - | - | 10 | - |
| 23 | Monika Henkel | West Germany | 8 | | 8 | - | - | - | - | - | - | - |
| | Heidi Wiesler | West Germany | 8 | | - | - | - | 8 | - | - | - | - |
| | Traudl Hächer | West Germany | 8 | | - | - | - | - | 7 | 1 | - | - |
| | Elisabeth Kirchler | Austria | 8 | | - | - | - | 4 | - | - | 4 | - |
| | Olga Charvátová | Czechoslovakia | 8 | | 2 | - | - | - | - | - | 3 | 3 |
| 28 | Jana Šoltýsová | Czechoslovakia | 7 | | 7 | - | - | - | - | - | - | - |
| | Veronika Vitzthum | Austria | 7 | | - | 7 | - | - | - | - | - | - |
| 30 | Diane Haight | Canada | 6 | | 4 | 2 | - | - | - | - | - | - |
| | Regine Mösenlechner | West Germany | 6 | | - | - | - | 6 | - | - | - | - |
| 32 | Zoe Haas | Switzerland | 5 | | 5 | - | - | - | - | - | - | - |
| 33 | Roxanne Toly | United States | 3 | | - | 3 | - | - | - | - | - | - |
| | Shane Leavitt | Canada | 3 | | - | - | 3 | - | - | - | - | - |
| 35 | Erika Hess | Switzerland | 2 | | - | - | 2 | - | - | - | - | - |
| | Michaela Gerg | West Germany | 2 | | - | - | - | 2 | - | - | - | - |
| | Brigitte Oertli | Switzerland | 2 | | - | - | - | - | - | - | - | 2 |
| | Françoise Bozon | France | 2 | | - | - | - | - | - | - | 1 | 1 |

Alpine skiing World Cup
Women

Overall | Downhill | Giant slalom | Slalom | Combined

1982
