= 1982 Alpine Skiing World Cup – Women's combined =

1982 Women's combined World Cup
Previous: 1981	Next: 1983

Women's combined World Cup 1981/1982

== Calendar ==
Round	Race No	Discipline	Place	Country	Date	Winner	Second	Third
1	6	Giant; Downhill	Val d'Isère; Saalbach-Hinterglemm	France; Austria	December 4, 1981; December 18, 1981	(West Germany) Irene Epple	(Switzerland) Erika Hess	(West Germany) Christa Kinshofer
2	9	Downhill slalom	Saalbach-Hinterglemm; St. Gervais	Austria; France	December 19, 1981; December 21, 1981	(United States) Christin Cooper	(Austria) Lea Sölkner	(West Germany) Irene Epple
3	15	Giant; Downhill	Pfronten; Grindelwald	West Germany; Switzerland	January 8, 1982; January 14, 1982	(West Germany) Irene Epple	(Switzerland) Erika Hess	(United States) Cindy Nelson
4	19	Downhill slalom	Badgastein	Austria	January 18 or 19 1982; January 20, 1982	(Switzerland) Erika Hess	(West Germany) Irene Epple	(Austria) Lea Sölkner

== Final point standings ==
In women's combined World Cup 1981/82 all 4 results count.

Place	Name	Country	Total points	6 (France) (Austria)	9 (Austria) (France)	15 (Germany) (Switzerland)	19 (Austria)
1	Irene Epple	West Germany	85	25	15	25	20
2	Erika Hess	Switzerland	77	20	12	20	25
3	Cindy Nelson	United States	43	5	11	15	12
4	Lea Sölkner	Austria	41	6	20	-	15
5	Christin Cooper	United States	37	12	25	-	-
6	Christa Kinshofer	West Germany	24	15	9	-	-
7	Zoe Haas	Switzerland	22	10	-	12	-
8	Abbi Fisher	United States	19	9	10	-	-
9	Traudl Hächer	West Germany	19	11	-	8	-
10	Elisabeth Kirchler	Austria	18	-	-	11	7
11	Ingrid Eberle	Austria	17	8	-	-	9
12	Sylvia Eder	Austria	16	-	-	5	11
13	Élisabeth Chaud	France	12	3	-	9	-
14	Perrine Pelen	France	10	-	-	10	-
	Daniela Zini	Italy	10	-	-	-	10
16	Gerry Sorensen	Canada	9	2	-	7	-
17	Krystyna Bortko	Poland	8	-	8	-	-
	Olga Charvátová	Czechoslovakia	8	-	-	-	8
19	Monika Henkel	West Germany	7	7	-	-	-
20	Holly Flanders	United States	6	-	-	6	-
	Heidi Wiesler	West Germany	6	-	-	-	6
22	Veronique Robin	Switzerland	5	-	-	-	5
23	Brigitte Oertli	Switzerland	4	4	-	-	-
14	Linda Rocchetti	Italy	4	-	-	4	-
	Florence Monnard	Switzerland	4	-	-	-	4
26	Michaela Gerg	West Germany	3	-	-	3	-
	Carole Merle	France	3	-	-	-	3
	Diane Haight	Canada	3	-	-	2	1
29	Marina Junusova	Soviet Union	2	-	-	-	2
30	Marina Kiehl	West Germany	1	1	-	-	-
	Jana Šoltýsová	Czechoslovakia	1	-	-	1	-

Note:

Race 2 not all points were awarded (not enough finishers).

Alpine skiing World Cup
Women

Overall | Downhill | Giant slalom | Slalom | Combined

1982
