= FIS Alpine World Ski Championships 1982 =

Skiing event in Schladming, Austria

Coordinates: 47.392°N 13.694°E

- Host city: Schladming, Styria, Austria
- Events: 8
- Opening: 27 January 1982
- Closing: 7 February 1982
- Opened by: Rudolf Kirchschläger
- Main venue: Planai (men); Haus im Ennstal (women)

Location in the Alps of Europe
Location in Austria

The FIS Alpine World Ski Championships 1982 were held in Schladming, Austria, between 28 January and 7 February 1982. These were the 27th World Championships; the men's races were held at Planai and the women's at Haus im Ennstal.

The combined event returned as a separate event, with its own downhill and two slalom runs. From 1954 through 1980, it was a "paper race" which used the results from the three races (downhill, giant slalom, and slalom). The combined was last run at the world championships in 1948, the last without the giant slalom event. The combined was absent from the program in 1950 and 1952.

Ingemar Stenmark of Sweden won gold in the slalom and silver in the giant slalom, upset by Steve Mahre of the United States. Two women were triple medalists: Erika Hess of Switzerland won three golds, with titles in the slalom, giant slalom, and combined, and Christin Cooper of the U.S. won two silvers and a bronze. Switzerland and the U.S. led in total medals with five each; Switzerland had three golds (Hess') and five other nations each had a single gold medal.

These were the last World Championships scheduled for an even-numbered year (1996 was a postponement of 1995, due to lack of snow). The world championships returned to Schladming in 2013, with all 11 events held at Planai.

== Men's competitions ==
Races were held at Planai.

=== Downhill ===
Saturday, 6 February

Place	Athlete	Nation	Time	Diff.
1st place, gold medalist(s)	Harti Weirather	Austria (AUT)	1:55.10	–
2nd place, silver medalist(s)	Conradin Cathomen	Switzerland (SUI)	1:55.58	+ 0.48
3rd place, bronze medalist(s)	Erwin Resch	Austria (AUT)	1:55.73	+ 0.63
4	Franz Heinzer	Switzerland (SUI)	1:55.98	+ 0.88
5	Peter Müller	Switzerland (SUI)	1:56.05	+ 0.95
6	Vladimir Makeev	Soviet Union (URS)	1:56.10	+ 1.00
7	Franz Klammer	Austria (AUT)	1:56.16	+ 1.06
8	Toni Bürgler	Switzerland (SUI)	1:56.61	+ 1.51
9	Steve Podborski	Canada (CAN)	1:56.78	+ 1.68
10	Michael Mair	Italy (ITA)	1:56.85	+ 1.75
11	Dave Murray	Canada (CAN)	1:56.94	+ 1.84
12	Peter Wirnsberger	Austria (AUT)	1:57.14	+ 2.04
13	Todd Brooker	Canada (CAN)	1:57.16	+ 2.06
14	Ken Read	Canada (CAN)	1:57.18	+ 2.08
15	Leonhard Stock	Austria (AUT)	1:57.25	+ 2.15
16	Konrad Bartelski	Great Britain (GBR)	1:57.49	+ 2.39
17	Michael Veith	West Germany (FRG)	1:57.76	+ 2.66
18	Valeri Tsyganov	Soviet Union (URS)	1:57.78	+ 2.68
19	Michel Vion	France (FRA)	1:57.86	+ 2.76
20	Philippe Verneret	France (FRA)	1:58.09	+ 2.99
22	Tris Cochrane	United States (USA)	1:58.31	+ 3.21

=== Giant slalom ===
Wednesday, 3 February

Place	Athlete	Nation	Time	Diff.	Run 1	Run 2
1st place, gold medalist(s)	Steve Mahre	United States (USA)	2:38.80	–	1:21.32	1:17.48
2nd place, silver medalist(s)	Ingemar Stenmark	Sweden (SWE)	2:39.31	+ 0.51	1:22.69	1:16.62
3rd place, bronze medalist(s)	Boris Strel	Yugoslavia (YUG)	2:39.42	+ 0.62	1:22.94	1:16.48
4	Joël Gaspoz	Switzerland (SUI)	2:39.49	+ 0.69
5	Bruno Nöckler	Italy (ITA)	2:39.80	+ 1.00
6	Hans Enn	Austria (AUT)	2:39.96	+ 1.16
7	Bojan Križaj	Yugoslavia (YUG)	2:40.01	+ 1.21
8	Jean-Luc Fournier	Switzerland (SUI)	2:40.19	+ 1.39
9	Alain Navillod	France (FRA)	2:40.77	+ 1.93
10	Hubert Strolz	Austria (AUT)	2:41.28	+ 2.48
11	Jarle Halsnes	Norway (NOR)	2:41.36	+ 2.56
12	Torsten Jakobsson	Sweden (SWE)	2:41.28	+ 2.48
13	Max Julen	Switzerland (SUI)	2:41.51	+ 2.71
14	Jure Franko	Yugoslavia (YUG)	2:42.47	+ 3.67
15	Christian Orlainsky	Austria (AUT)	2:43.07	+ 4.27
16	Aleksandr Zhirov	Soviet Union (URS)	2:43.63	+ 4.83
17	Valeri Tsyganov	Soviet Union (URS)	2:43.72	+ 4.92
18	Odd Sørli	Norway (NOR)	2:44.12	+ 4.32
19	Mirolsav Schimmer	Czechoslovakia (TCH)	2:44.23	+ 4.43
20	Paul Arne Skajem	Norway (NOR)	2:44.28	+ 4.48
27	Jim Read	Canada (CAN)	2:48.77	+ 8.97

=== Slalom ===
Sunday, 7 February

Place	Athlete	Nation	Time	Diff.	Run 1	Run 2
1st place, gold medalist(s)	Ingemar Stenmark	Sweden (SWE)	1:48.48	–	52.08	56.40
2nd place, silver medalist(s)	Bojan Križaj	Yugoslavia (YUG)	1:48.90	+ 0.42	52.39	56.51
3rd place, bronze medalist(s)	Bengt Fjällberg	Sweden (SWE)	1:49.32	+ 0.84	52.63	56.69
4	Paolo De Chiesa	Italy (ITA)	1:49.37	+ 0.89
5	Joël Gaspoz	Switzerland (SUI)	1:49.51	+ 1.03
6	Piero Gros	Italy (ITA)	1:50.68	+ 2.20
7	Peter Mally	Italy (ITA)	1:51.08	+ 2.60
8	Franz Gruber	Austria (AUT)	1:51.18	+ 2.70
9	Paul Arne Skajem	Norway (NOR)	1:51.78	+ 3.30
10	Vladimir Andreyev	Soviet Union (URS)	1:52.60	+ 4.12
11	Jarle Halsnes	Norway (NOR)	1:53.52	+ 5.04
12	Toshihiro Kaiwa	Japan (JPN)	1:53.89	+ 5.41
13	Aleksandr Zhirov	Soviet Union (URS)	1:54.48	+ 6.00
14	Tomaž Cerkovnik	Yugoslavia (YUG)	1:54.71	+ 6.23
15	Florian Beck	West Germany (FRG)	1:55.01	+ 6.53

=== Combined ===
Monday, 1 February (slalom: 2 runs)
Friday, 5 February (downhill)

Place	Athlete	Nation	Points
1st place, gold medalist(s)	Michel Vion	France (FRA)	12.64
2nd place, silver medalist(s)	Peter Lüscher	Switzerland (SUI)	18.08
3rd place, bronze medalist(s)	Anton Steiner	Austria (AUT)	20.48
4	Wolfram Ortner	Austria (AUT)	20.69
5	Michel Canac	France (FRA)	35.42
6	Odd Sørli	Norway (NOR)	46.51
7	Gustav Oehrli	Switzerland (SUI)	59.47
8	Ernst Riedlsperger	Austria (AUT)	61.13
9	Bruno Nöckler	Italy (ITA)	61.55
10	Peter Roth	West Germany (FRG)	62.14
11	Valeri Tsyganov	Soviet Union (URS)	78.91
12	Tomaž Cerkovnik	Yugoslavia (YUG)	91.71
13	Ivan Pacak	Czechoslovakia (TCH)	100.09
14	Shinya Chiba	Japan (JPN)	103.15
15	Miroslav Schimmer	Czechoslovakia (TCH)	103.99
22	Tris Cochrane	United States (USA)	141.30

== Women's competitions ==
Races were held at Haus im Ennstal.

=== Downhill ===
Thursday, 4 February

Place	Athlete	Nation	Time	Diff.
1st place, gold medalist(s)	Gerry Sorensen	Canada (CAN)	1:37.47	–
2nd place, silver medalist(s)	Cindy Nelson	United States (USA)	1:37.88	+ 0.41
3rd place, bronze medalist(s)	Laurie Graham	Canada (CAN)	1:37.91	+ 0.44
4	Torill Fjeldstad	Norway (NOR)	1:38.12	+ 0.65
5	Diane Lehodey	Canada (CAN)	1:38.22	+ 0.75
6	Elisabeth Kirchler	Austria (AUT)	1:38.24	+ 0.77
7	Doris de Agostini	Switzerland (SUI)	1:38.49	+ 1.02
8	Irene Epple	West Germany (FRG)	1:38.56	+ 1.19
9	Holly Flanders	United States (USA)	1:38.68	+ 1.21
10	Cindy Oak	United States (USA)	1:38.74	+ 1.27

=== Giant slalom ===
Tuesday, 2 February

Place	Athlete	Nation	Time	Diff.	Run 1	Run 2
1st place, gold medalist(s)	Erika Hess	Switzerland (SUI)	2:37.17	–	1:20.33	1:16.84
2nd place, silver medalist(s)	Christin Cooper	United States (USA)	2:37.95	+ 0.78	1:21.59	1:16.36
3rd place, bronze medalist(s)	Ursula Konzett	Liechtenstein (LIE)	2:38.03	+ 0.86	1:21.72	1:16.31
4	Petra Wenzel	Liechtenstein (LIE)	2:38.05	+ 0.88
5	Fabienne Serrat	France (FRA)	2:38.49	+ 1.32
6	Tamara McKinney	United States (USA)	2:38.77	+ 1.60
7	Daniela Zini	Italy (ITA)	2:39.31	+ 2.14
8	Elisabeth Kirchler	Austria (AUT)	2:39.63	+ 2.46
9	Christa Kinshofer	West Germany (FRG)	2:39.73	+ 2.56
10	Roswitha Steiner	Austria (AUT)	2:39.85	+ 2.68

=== Slalom ===
Friday, 5 February

Place	Athlete	Nation	Time	Diff.	Run 1	Run 2
1st place, gold medalist(s)	Erika Hess	Switzerland (SUI)	1:41.60	–	50.93	50.67
2nd place, silver medalist(s)	Christin Cooper	United States (USA)	1:41.93	+ 0.33	51.24	50.69
3rd place, bronze medalist(s)	Daniela Zini	Italy (ITA)	1:41.96	+ 0.36	51.27	50.69
4	Dorota Tlałka	Poland (POL)	1:42.16	+ 0.56
5	Maria Rosa Quario	Italy (ITA)	1:42.17	+ 0.57
6	Maria Epple	West Germany (FRG)	1:43.85	+ 2.25
7	Roswitha Steiner	Austria (AUT)	1:43.99	+ 2.39
8	Metka Jerman	Yugoslavia (YUG)	1:44.74	+ 3.14
9	Olga Charvátová	Czechoslovakia (TCH)	1:44.80	+ 3.20
10	Fabienne Serrat	France (FRA)	1:44.89	+ 3.29

=== Combined ===
Thursday, 28 January (downhill)
Sunday, 31 January (slalom: 2 runs)

Place	Athlete	Nation	Points
1st place, gold medalist(s)	Erika Hess	Switzerland (SUI)	8.99
2nd place, silver medalist(s)	Perrine Pelen	France (FRA)	17.95
3rd place, bronze medalist(s)	Christin Cooper	United States (USA)	20.96
4	Cindy Nelson	United States (USA)	21.21
5	Olga Charvátová	Czechoslovakia (TCH)	31.60
6	Anni Kronbichler	Austria (AUT)	36.75

== Medals table ==
Place	Nation	Gold	Silver	Bronze	Total
1	Switzerland (SUI)	3	2	–	5
2	United States (USA)	1	3	1	5
3	Sweden (SWE)	1	1	1	3
4	France (FRA)	1	1	–	2
5	Austria (AUT)	1	–	2	3
6	Canada (CAN)	1	–	1	2
7	Yugoslavia (YUG)	–	1	1	2
8	Italy (ITA)	–	–	1	1
8	Liechtenstein (LIE)	–	–	1	1
