= Peter Mally =

Italian alpine skier (born 1958)

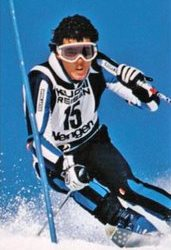

Personal information
- Born: 19 October 1958 (age 68) Merano, Italy

Skiing career
- Sport: Alpine skiing
- Retired: 1983
- Disciplines: Technical events
- World Cup debut: 1978

World Championships
- Teams: 1 (1982)

World Cup
- Seasons: 6

Peter Mally (born 19 October 1958) is an Italian alpine skiing coach and former alpine skier who finished 7th in slalom at the 1982 World Championships.

== World Cup results ==
Top 10

Date	Place	Discipline	Position
03/03/1978	(United States) Stratton Mountain	Giant Slalom	10
04/03/1978	(United States) Stratton Mountain	Slalom	10
06/03/1978	(United States) Waterville Valley	Giant Slalom	9
18/03/1978	(Switzerland) Arosa	Giant Slalom	7
09/01/1979	(Switzerland) Crans-Montana	Slalom	9
15/01/1979	(Switzerland) Crans-Montana	Slalom	4
05/02/1979	(Czechoslovakia) Jasná	Slalom	9
09/12/1980	(Italy) Madonna di Campiglio	Slalom	4
12/01/1982	(Germany) Bad Wiessee	Slalom	6

== World Championship results ==
Date	Place	Discipline	Position
07/02/1982	(Austria) Schladming	Slalom	7
