= Piera Macchi =

Italian alpine skier (born 1959)

Personal information
- Born: 5 March 1959 (age 67) Varese, Italy

Skiing career
- Sport: Alpine skiing
- Retired: 1982
- Disciplines: Technical events
- World Cup debut: 1979

World Championships
- Teams: 1
- Medals: 0

World Cup
- Seasons: 4
- Podiums: 0

Piera Macchi (born 5 March 1959) is a former Italian World Cup alpine ski racer who competed in one edition (1982) of the FIS Alpine World Ski Championships.

== Career ==
Between 1979 and 1982 she collected twelve top 10 placings in the World Cup.

== World Championships results ==
Year
Year	Age	Slalom	Giant; Slalom	Downhill	Combined
1982	2q	11	-	-	-
