= Jacques Reymond =

Swiss ski trainer (1950–2020)

Jacques Reymond (30 August 1950 – 6 May 2020) was a Swiss ski trainer.

== Life ==
Reymond worked for many years as a trainer for the Swiss Ski Association Swiss-Ski. From 1979 to 1995 he acted as head coach and technical coach of the Swiss men's national team. He was also a condition trainer for the women's national team for several years. He also looked after Erika Hess in the women's national team.

After retiring from active skiing, he married Hess on 6 May 1988. The marriage gave birth to three sons; Marco, the youngest, drives races in the European Cup and World Cup. The two lived in Saint-Légier-La Chiésaz in Canton of Vaud. Together they organized races and training camps for young ski racers.

In Saint-Légier-La Chiésaz, Reymond was also politically active; he was president of the municipal council.

== Death ==
During the COVID-19 pandemic in Switzerland, Reymond fell ill with COVID-19 and after several weeks died from the virus on 6 May 2020, at the age of 69.
