= Maria Rosa Quario =

Italian alpine skier

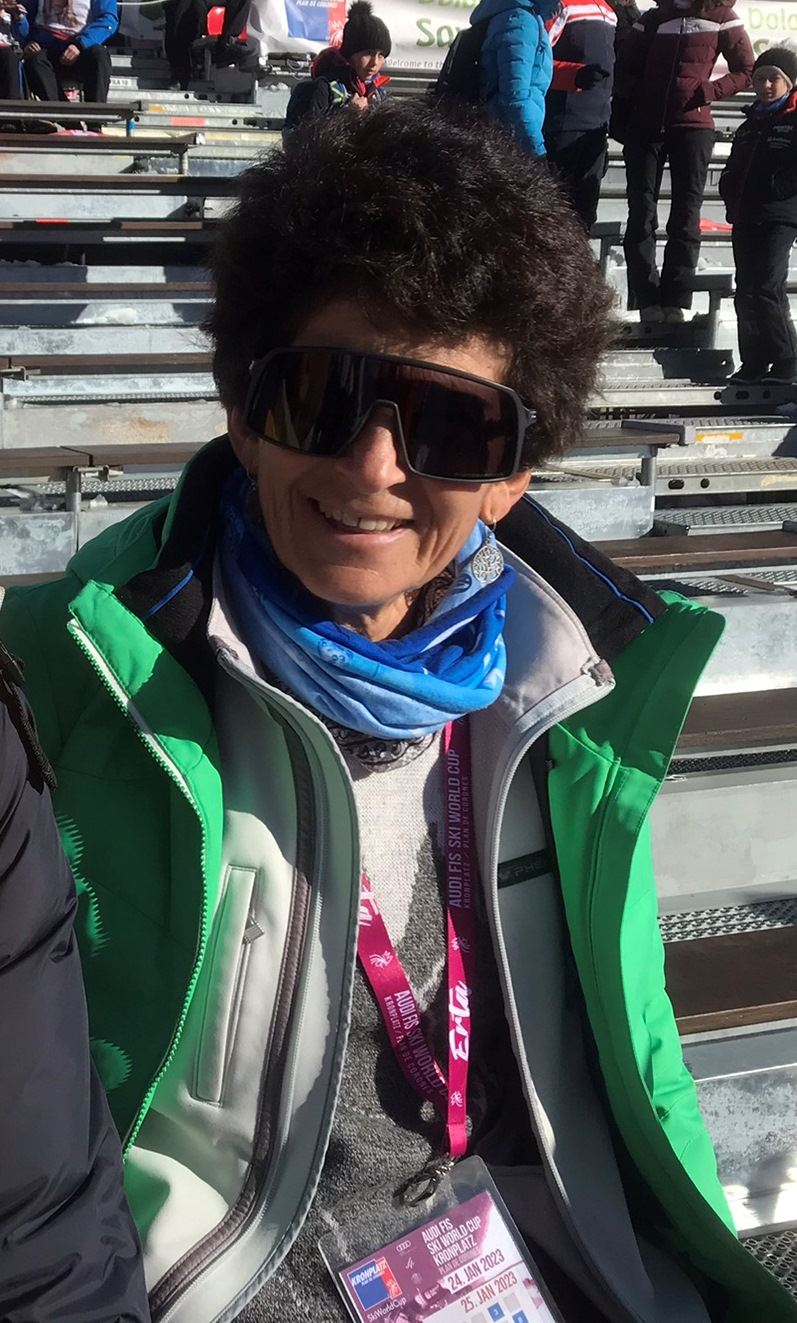
- Quario in 2023.

Personal information
- Born: 24 May 1961 (age 65) Milan, Lombardy, Italy
- Height: 163 cm (5 ft 4 in)

Skiing career
- Sport: Alpine skiing
- Club: Sci Club Courmayeur
- Retired: March 1986 (age 24)
- Disciplines: Slalom, giant slalom
- World Cup debut: December 1978 (age 17)

Olympics
- Teams: 2 – (1980, 1984)
- Medals: 0

World Championships
- Teams: 2 – (1980, 1982) includes one Olympics
- Medals: 0

World Cup
- Seasons: 8 – (1979–1986)
- Wins: 4 – (4 SL)
- Podiums: 15 – (15 SL)
- Overall titles: 0 – (10th in 1982)
- Discipline titles: 0 – (3rd in 1983, SL)
Medal record
World Cup race podiums
Event	1st	2nd	3rd
Slalom	4	6	5
Total	4	6	5

Maria Rosa "Ninna" Quario (born 24 May 1961) is a former World Cup alpine ski racer from Italy. Nicknamed "Ninna", she had four World Cup victories and 15 podiums, all in slalom. Quario is the mother of alpine racer Federica Brignone (born 1990).

== Biography ==
Born in Milan, Lombardy, Quario competed in the Winter Olympics in 1980 and 1984, and finished fourth and seventh in the slalom, respectively. She also competed at the 1982 World Championships and placed fifth in the slalom.

== World Cup results ==
=== Race podiums ===
- 4 victories - (4 SL)
- 15 podiums - (15 SL)

Season	Date	Location	Discipline	Place
1979	27 Jan 1979	Mellau, Austria	Slalom	1st
1979	8 Feb 1979	(Socialist Federal Republic of Yugoslavia) Maribor, Yugoslavia	Slalom	3rd
1981	13 Dec 1980	Piancavallo, Italy	Slalom	3rd
1982	13 Dec 1981	Piancavallo, Italy	Slalom	3rd
1982	3 Jan 1982	(Socialist Federal Republic of Yugoslavia) Maribor, Yugoslavia	Slalom	2nd
1982	3 Mar 1982	(United States) Waterville Valley, NH, USA	Slalom	2nd
1983	16 Jan 1983	Schruns, Austria	Slalom	2nd
1983	30 Jan 1983	Les Diablerets, Switzerland	Slalom	1st
1983	12 Feb 1983	Vysoké Tatry, Czechoslovakia	Slalom	1st
1984	14 Dec 1983	Sestriere, Italy	Slalom	1st
1984	17 Dec 1983	Piancavallo, Italy	Slalom	3rd
1984	23 Jan 1984	Limone Piemonte, Italy	Slalom	2nd
1985	11 Jan 1985	Bad Kleinkirchheim, Austria	Slalom	2nd
1985	16 Mar 1985	(United States) Waterville Valley, NH, USA	Slalom	2nd
1985	19 Mar 1985	(United States) Park City, UT, USA	Slalom	3rd

=== Season standings ===
Season	Age	Overall	Slalom	Giant slalom	Super G	Downhill	Combined
1979	17	13	7	25	not run	—	
1980	18	31	18	18	not run	—	—
1981	19	18	11	15	not run	—	—
1982	20	10	4	10	not run	—	—
1983	21	14	3	—	not awarded (w/ GS)	—	—
1984	22	17	5	—	not awarded (w/ GS)	—	—
1985	23	19	4	—	not awarded (w/ GS)	—	—
1986	24	55	19	—	—	—	—

== World Series ==
Quario also had two victories in special slaloms in the World Series, which were events held in late November, immediately before the World Cup season. The first win came at age 17, two months before her initial World Cup victory (and podium).

- 28 Nov 1978 - slalom – Stelvio, Italy
- 26 Nov 1982 - slalom – Bormio, Italy
