= Schladming =

- Municipality
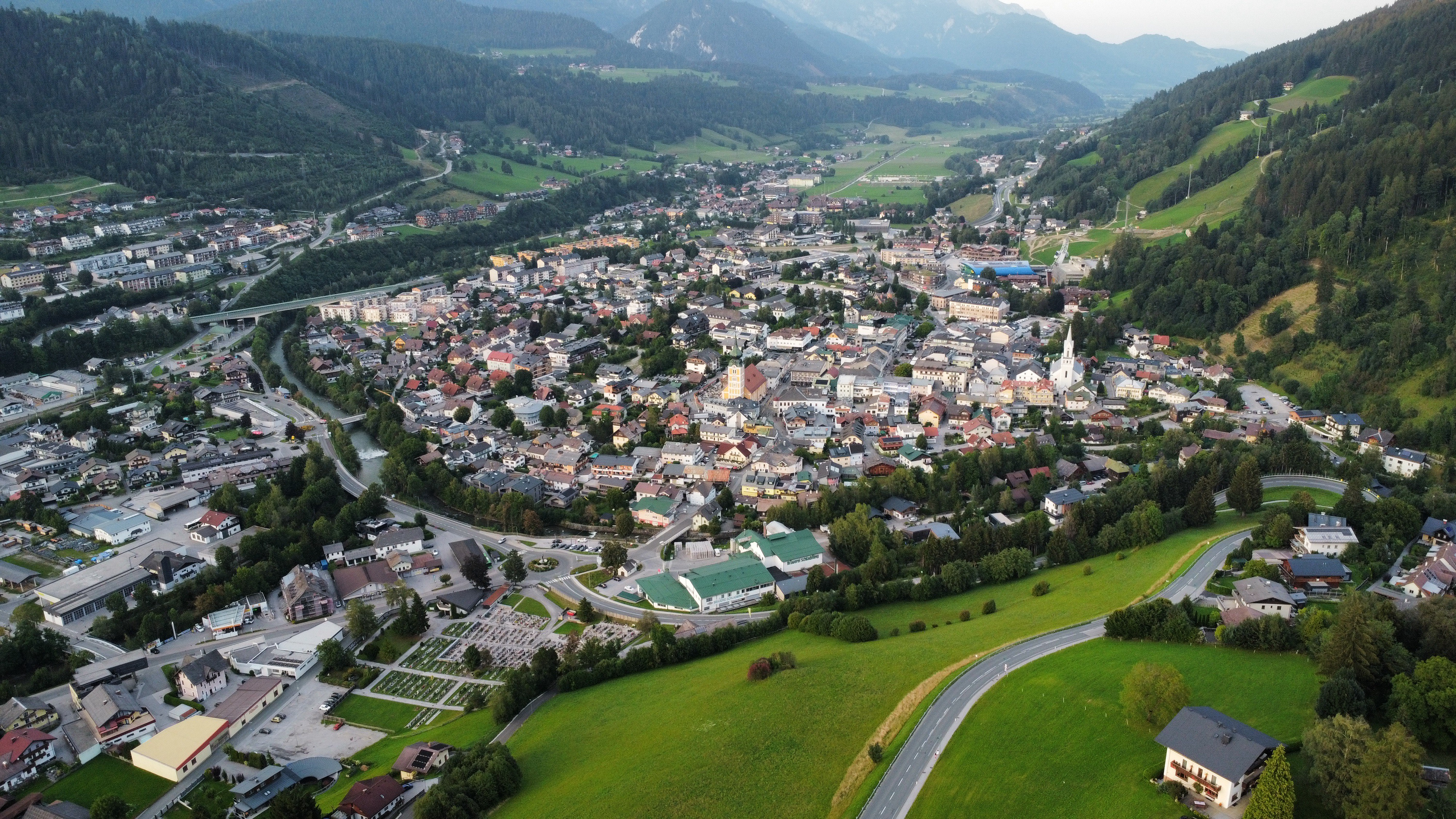
- Schladming in August 2024

- Coat of arms

- Location within Austria
- Coordinates: 47°23′39″N 13°41′21″E
- Country: Austria
- State: Styria
- District: Liezen

Government
  - Mayor: Hermann Trinker

Area
  - Total: 211 km^{2} (81 sq mi)
- Elevation: 745 m (2,444 ft)

Population (2018-01-01)
  - Total: 6,660
  - Density: 31.6/km^{2} (81.8/sq mi)
- Time zone: UTC+1 (CET)
  - Summer (DST): UTC+2 (CEST)
- Postal code: 8970
- Area code: 03687
- Vehicle registration: GB
- Website: www.schladming.at

Schladming (German: [ˈʃlaːdmiŋ]) is a small former mining town in the northwest of the Austrian state of Styria that is now a popular tourist destination. It has become a large winter-sports resort and has held various skiing competitions, including most notably the FIS Alpine World Ski Championships 1982 and the FIS Alpine World Ski Championships 2013. The shopping area has many cafes and restaurants, and a variety of shops that cater to tourists.

== Population ==
Historical population
| Year | Pop. | ±% |
|---|---|---|
| 1869 | 1,259 | — |
| 1880 | 1,421 | +12.9% |
| 1890 | 1,487 | +4.6% |
| 1900 | 1,721 | +15.7% |
| 1910 | 2,011 | +16.9% |
| 1923 | 1,948 | −3.1% |
| 1934 | 2,132 | +9.4% |
| 1939 | 2,200 | +3.2% |
| 1951 | 3,189 | +45.0% |
| 1961 | 3,249 | +1.9% |
| 1971 | 3,460 | +6.5% |
| 1981 | 3,918 | +13.2% |
| 1991 | 4,377 | +11.7% |
| 2001 | 4,570 | +4.4% |
| 2011 | 4,477 | −2.0% |

== Recreation ==
=== Winter sports ===
The local peak for winter sports is the Planai. A ten-seater cable car with a middle station takes tourists up the mountain. The Planai consists of many red and black slopes for competitive skiers, and many blue slopes for beginners, but generally the Planai is an intermediate to expert mountain. The Hochwurzen is the other mountain in Schladming. It has three main red runs off the four-man chair lift and a sledge run. This mountain is better suited to more experienced boarders and skiers. Also, There is a new 8 man cable car to the top. Schladming is also in close proximity to the Reiteralm ski resort, where the 2019 Ski Cross Junior World Championships and 2019 Ski Cross Europa Cup finals were held.

=== Non-winter months ===
The surrounding mountains are popular with climbers and hikers and country lovers. In the summer, downhill toboggan runs and an outdoor swimming complex are open.

The UCI Mountainbike Worldcup has taken place in Schladming since 2004. In 2010, the Mountainbike Worldcup in Schladming was relocated to Leogang due to construction work taking place for the Ski World Championships in 2013.

== History ==
The first official mention of the settlement on the site of today's Schladming dates back to 1180. First name of the town was Slaebnich which is of Slavic origin (Slovenian; Slabnik, Slapnik). In the early and high Middle Ages, the place, like the whole of Styria, belonged to the settlement of the Alpine Slavs and was part of the Slavic principality of Carantania.

During the period of German colonization, the place gradually acquired a Germanic character, although many Slavic elements were preserved in culture and language.

== Politics ==
The municipal council (Gemeinderat) consists of 25 members. Since the 2025 local elections, it is made up of the following parties:

- List Schladming - Hermann Trinker (LISTE): 11 seats
- Austrian People's Party (ÖVP): 7 seats
- Freedom Party of Austria (FPÖ): 5 seats
- NEOS - The New Austria and Liberal Forum (NEOS): 1 seat
- Social Democratic Party of Austria (SPÖ): 1 seat

The mayor, Hermann Trinker, was first elected by the municipal council in 2020.

== Transport ==
A bus service runs up and down the Planai and surrounding mountains throughout the year. Many ski lifts are on the mountains, some catering specifically for small runs.

== Sports and events ==
Since 1973, the Planai has been a regular location for Alpine Ski World Cup races. Since 1997, the race has been called a "Nightrace" because it takes place at night. In 1982 and 2013, Schladming hosted the Alpine World Ski Championships. In March 2017, Schladming was one of the host towns of the 2017 Special Olympics World Winter Games in Styria, Austria, together with nearby Ramsau am Dachstein and Graz.

== Twin cities ==
- Felletin, France since 1960
- Wetzlar, Germany since 1974
- Furano, Japan since 1977
