= Holly Flanders =

American alpine skier

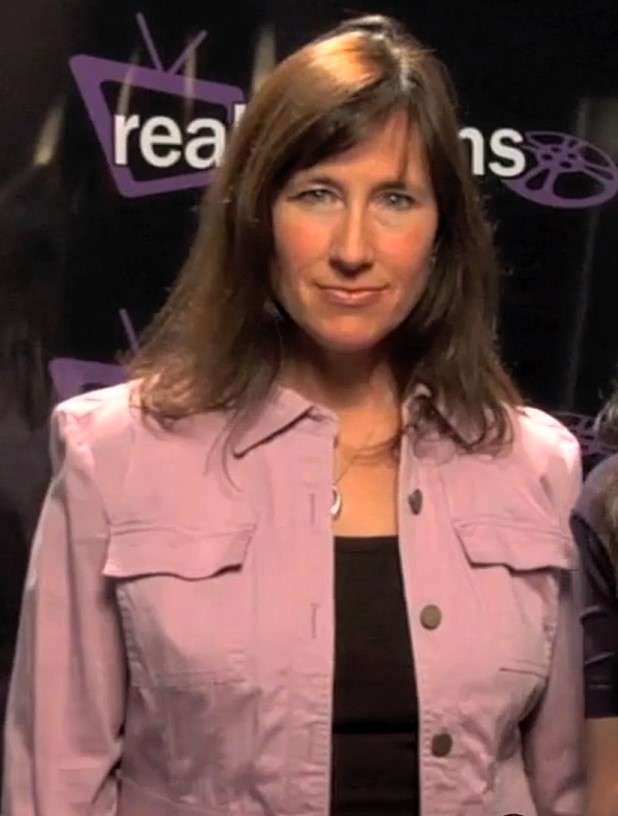
- Flanders interviewed in 2011

Personal information
- Full name: Holly Beth Flanders
- Born: December 26, 1957 (age 68) Arlington, Massachusetts, U.S.
- Height: 5 ft 6 in (1.68 m)
- Website: hollyflanders.com

Skiing career
- Sport: Alpine skiing
- Retired: March 1986 (age 28)
- Disciplines: Downhill, super-G, combined, giant slalom
- World Cup debut: January 26, 1979 (age 21) first top ten

Olympics
- Teams: 2 - (1980, 1984)
- Medals: 0

World Championships
- Teams: 3 - (1980, 1982, 1985) includes 1980 Olympics
- Medals: 0

World Cup
- Seasons: 8 - (1979–86)
- Wins: 3 - (1 DH)
- Podiums: 6 - (6 DH)
- Overall titles: 0 - (12th in 1982)
- Discipline titles: 0 - (2nd in DH, 1982)

Holly Beth Flanders (born December 26, 1957) is a former World Cup alpine ski racer from the United States.

== Racing career ==
Born in Arlington, Massachusetts, and raised in Candia NH, Flanders specialized in downhill and finished second in the World Cup downhill season standings in 1982. She gained her first World Cup victory that season in Bad Gastein, Austria, and followed it up with another podium the next day. Flanders represented the U.S. in the Winter Olympics in 1980 and 1984, and in the World Championships in 1982 and 1985. During her career, she tallied three World Cup wins, six podiums, and 27 top ten finishes.

== After racing ==
Flanders retired from international competition following the 1986 season and became director of skiing at the Park City ski resort in Utah. Her son, Alex Schlopy, is a freestyle skier.

== World Cup results ==
=== Race podiums ===
- 3 wins - (3 DH)
- 6 podiums - (6 DH)

Season	Date	Location	Discipline	Place
1981	8 Jan 1981	Pfronten, West Germany	Downhill	3rd
1982	18 Jan 1982	Bad Gastein, Austria	Downhill	1st
1982	19 Jan 1982	Bad Gastein, Austria	Downhill	3rd
1982	13 Feb 1982	Arosa, Switzerland	Downhill	1st
1984	21 Jan 1984	Verbier, Switzerland	Downhill	2nd
1984	3 Mar 1984	Mt. St. Anne, Canada	Downhill	1st

=== Season standings ===
Season	Age	Overall	Slalom	Giant slalom	Super G	Downhill	Combined
1979	21	28	—	—	not run	15	—
1980	22	23	—	—	not run	12	15
1981	23	19	—	—	not run	7	25
1982	24	12	—	—	not run	2	20
1983	25	54	—	—	not awarded (w/ GS)	26	—
1984	26	20	—	—	not awarded (w/ GS)	6	—
1985	27	38	—	44	not awarded (w/ GS)	13	—
1986	28	46	—	—	34	19	34

== World Championship results ==
Year	Age	Slalom	Giant slalom	Super-G	Downhill	Combined
1980	22	—	—	not run	14	—
1982	24	—	—	not run	9	—
1985	27	—	—	not run	20	—

From 1948 through 1980, the Winter Olympics were also the World Championships for alpine skiing.

== Olympic results ==
Year	Age	Slalom	Giant slalom	Super-G	Downhill	Combined
1980	22	—	—	not run	14	not run
1984	26	—	—	not run	16	not run
