= Cindy Oak =

American alpine skier (born 1961)

Cindy Oak (born April 21, 1961) is an American former alpine skier.

Primarily noted as a downhill skier, Oak had 5 top ten World Cup finishes between 1980 and 1985 including a tenth-place finish in the World Championship in 1982.

Oak lives in Ellicottville, NY with her husband and three children and is a member of Holimont.
