= Marie-Cécile Gros-Gaudenier =

French alpine skier (born 1960)

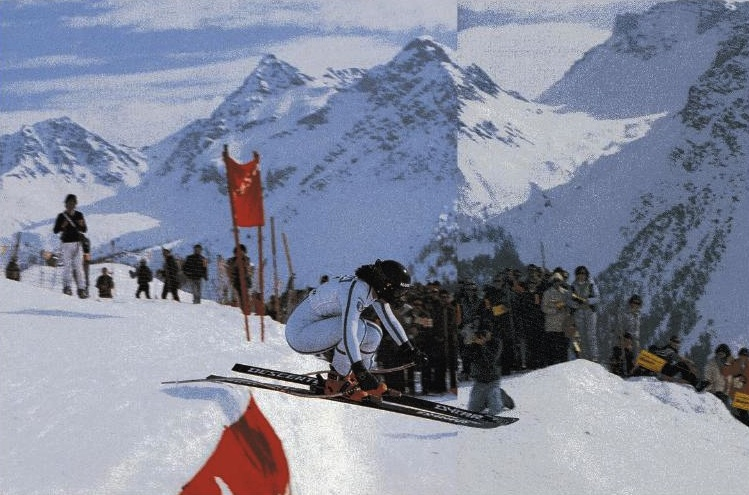

Marie-Cécile Gros-Gaudenier (born 18 June 1960 in Scionzier) is a retired French alpine skier.
