= Andreja Leskovšek =

Slovenian alpine skier (born 1965)

Andreja Leskovšek (born 11 January 1965, in Kranj) is a Slovenian former alpine skier who competed for Yugoslavia in the 1984 Winter Olympics.
