= Ann Melander =

Swedish alpine skier (born 1961)

Ann Eva Margareta Melander (born 18 June 1961 in Lund) is a Swedish former alpine skier who competed in the 1980 and 1984 Winter Olympics.
