= Gerry Sorensen =

Canadian alpine skier (born 1958)

Personal information
- Born: October 15, 1958 (age 67) Kimberly, British Columbia, Canada

Skiing career
- Sport: Alpine skiing
- Disciplines: Downhill, Slalom, Giant Slalom, Super G
- World Cup debut: December 12, 1980

Olympics
- Teams: 1

World Championships
- Teams: 1
- Medals: 1 (1 gold)

World Cup
- Seasons: 4
- Wins: 5
- Podiums: 6
Medal record
Representing Canada
Women's alpine skiing
World Championships
Gold medal – first place	1982 Schladming	Downhill

Gerry Sorensen (born October 15, 1958) is a Canadian former female alpine skier.

Sorensen was born in Kimberley, British Columbia, and began skiing at the age of 10.

== World Cup victories ==
Date	Location	Race
February 8, 1981	(Austria) Haus	Downhill
January 13, 1982	(Switzerland) Grindelwald	Downhill
January 14, 1982	(Switzerland) Grindelwald	Downhill
January 7, 1984	(France) Puy St. Vincent	Downhill
January 8, 1984	(France) Puy St. Vincent	Combined
