= Christin Cooper =

American alpine skier (born 1959)

Personal information
- Born: October 8, 1959 (age 66) Los Angeles, California
- Height: 5 ft 7 in (170 cm)

Skiing career
- Sport: Alpine skiing
- Retired: March 1984 (age 24)
- Disciplines: Downhill, super-G, giant slalom, slalom, combined
- World Cup debut: January 19, 1977 (age 17)

Olympics
- Teams: 2 – (1980, 1984)
- Medals: 1 (0 gold)

World Championships
- Teams: 3 – (1978, 1980, 1982)
- Medals: 3 (0 gold)

World Cup
- Seasons: 8 – (1977–1984)
- Wins: 5 – (1 GS, 2 SL, 2 K)
- Podiums: 26 – (1 SG, 10 GS, 9 SL, 6 K)
- Overall titles: 0 – (3rd in 1982)
- Discipline titles: 0 – (2nd in SL, 1981; 2nd in GS, 1984)
Medal record
Women's alpine skiing
Representing the United States
Olympic Games
Silver medal – second place	1984 Sarajevo	Giant slalom
World Championships
Silver medal – second place	1982 Haus im Ennstal	Giant slalom
Silver medal – second place	1982 Haus im Ennstal	Slalom
Bronze medal – third place	1982 Haus im Ennstal	Combined

Christin Elizabeth Cooper (born October 10, 1959) is a former World Cup alpine ski racer and Olympic medalist from the United States.

== Early years ==
Born in Los Angeles, California, she was raised in Ketchum, Idaho, and learned to ski and race at neighboring Sun Valley. Cooper's stepfather was William C. "Bill" Janss (1918–96), owner of the Sun Valley Resort until 1977.

After her father William died of cancer in Los Angeles, her mother Glenn moved the family of five children to Ketchum in the late 1960s. At the request of longtime friends Bill and Anne Janss, owners of Sun Valley, Mrs. Cooper founded the arts center for the resort in 1969. Anne Janss died in an avalanche accident near the resort in early 1973; later that year Glenn Cooper and Bill Janss were married, with a combined family of eight children.

== Racing career ==
As a member of the U.S. Ski Team, Cooper raced on the World Cup circuit from 1977-84. Starting the 1977 season on the "C" team, she made her World Cup debut at age 17 on January 19 and finished 14th in a slalom at Schruns, Austria; a week later she had a tenth-place finish in the slalom at Crans-Montana, Switzerland. Best in the technical events, she raced in all five disciplines, with World Cup podiums in four. She broke her ankle during training in August, prior to the 1978 season. She competed in the slalom at the 1978 World Championships in Garmisch, West Germany, but did not finish. At the 1980 Winter Olympics in Lake Placid at age twenty, she was eighth in the slalom and seventh in the giant slalom at Whiteface Mountain.

Cooper's best season in international competition was in 1982, when she won three medals (two silvers and a bronze) at the World Championships at Haus im Ennstal, Austria. She also had three World Cup victories and placed third in the 1982 World Cup overall standings. The previous season, she finished fourth in the women's overall and second in slalom.

A downhill training crash in late January at Les Diablerets in Switzerland sidelined her for the remainder of the 1983 season. It resulted in a compression fracture in her left tibia just below the knee and required a bone graft from her hip. Cooper returned to form the following season with five early podiums before the 1984 Winter Olympics, and then won the silver medal in the Olympic giant slalom, 0.40 seconds behind teammate Debbie Armstrong at Jahorina. Soon after, a run at her hometown resort of Sun Valley was named in her honor: the run "Silver Fox" on Seattle Ridge was renamed "Christin's Silver." Nearby on Seattle Ridge is "Gretchen's Gold," a run named after Gretchen Fraser, a gold medalist in the slalom at the 1948 Winter Olympics and a mentor to Cooper.

Cooper retired from international competition following the 1984 season, in which she was the runner-up in the season's giant slalom standings. She completed her racing career at age 24 with five World Cup victories, 26 podiums, and 68 top tens.

== World Cup results ==
=== Season standings ===
Season	Age	Overall	Slalom	Giant Slalom	Super G	Downhill	Combined
1977	17	35	18	25	not run	—	—
1978	18	18	7	20	not run	—	—
1979	19	21	16	—	not run	42	—
1980	20	18	21	11	not run	—	—
1981	21	4	2	7	not run	42	11
1982	22	3	3	5	not run	21	9
1983	23	12	16	12	not awarded	—	5
1984	24	6	9	2	not awarded	29	6

=== Race podiums ===
- 5 victories – (1 GS, 2 SL, 2 K)
- 26 podiums – (1 SG, 10 GS, 9 SL, 6 K); 68 top tens

Season	Date	Location	Discipline	Place
1981	21 Jan 1981	Crans-Montana, Switzerland	Slalom	2nd
1981	21 Jan 1981	Crans-Montana, Switzerland	Combined	3rd
1981	31 Jan 1981	Les Diablerets, Switzerland	Slalom	2nd
1981	03 Feb 1981	Zwiesel, West Germany	Slalom	3rd
1981	08 Feb 1981	Zwiesel, West Germany	Combined	3rd
1981	13 Mar 1981	Furano, Japan	Giant slalom	3rd
1981	15 Mar 1981	Furano, Japan	Slalom	2nd
1981	25 Mar 1981	Wangs-Pizol, Switzerland	Giant slalom	2nd
1982	21 Dec 1981	Saint-Gervais, France	Combined	1st
1982	23 Jan 1982	Berchtesgaden, West Germany	Slalom	1st
1982	(Austria) 1982 World Championships			
1982	9 Feb 1982	Oberstaufen, West Germany	Giant slalom	2nd
1982	21 Mar 1982	Alpe d'Huez, France	Giant slalom	3rd
1982	25 Mar 1982	San Sicario, Italy	Giant slalom	3rd
1982	27 Mar 1982	Montgenèvre, France	Slalom	1st
1983	17 Dec 1982	Piancavallo, Italy	Slalom	3rd
1983	17 Dec 1982	Piancavallo, Italy	Combined	1st
1983	23 Jan 1983	Saint-Gervais, France	Combined	2nd
1984	14 Dec 1983	Sestriere, Italy	Combined	3rd
1984	22 Dec 1983	Haus im Ennstal, Austria	Giant slalom	3rd
1984	15 Jan 1984	(Socialist Federal Republic of Yugoslavia) Maribor, Yugoslavia	Slalom	3rd
1984	23 Jan 1984	Limone Piemonte, Italy	Slalom	3rd
1984	29 Jan 1984	Saint-Gervais, France	Giant slalom	2nd
1984	(Socialist Federal Republic of Yugoslavia) 1984 Winter Olympics			
1984	04 Mar 1984	Mt. Ste. Anne, QC, Canada	Super-G	3rd
1984	07 Mar 1984	(United States) Lake Placid, NY, USA	Giant slalom	1st
1984	11 Mar 1984	(United States) Waterville Valley, NH, USA	Giant slalom	3rd
1984	17 Mar 1984	Jasná, Czechoslovakia	Giant slalom	3rd

== World championship results ==
Year	Age	Slalom	Giant Slalom	Super-G	Downhill	Combined
1978	18	DNF2	23	not run	—	—
1980	20	8	7	not run	—	—
1982	22	2	2	not run	—	3

From 1948 through 1980, the Winter Olympics were also the World Championships for alpine skiing.
At the World Championships from 1954 through 1980, the combined was a "paper race" using the results of the three events (DH, GS, SL).

== Olympic results ==
Year	Age	Slalom	Giant Slalom	Super-G	Downhill	Combined
1980	20	8	7	not run	—	not run
1984	24	DNF1	2	not run	—	not run

== Post-racing ==
Cooper has worked as a television broadcaster for CBS and NBC, covering alpine ski racing, including the 2010 Vancouver games. She teamed with Tim Ryan, a fellow Ketchum resident, during the 1992, 1994, and 1998 Winter Olympics. Christin and her husband, former U.S. Ski Team member Mark Taché (of Aspen, CO), are co-founders of Montana Ale Works, a public house and restaurant in Bozeman, Montana.

=== 2014 Winter Olympics ===
While covering the 2014 Winter Olympics in Sochi as a reporter on alpine skiing for NBC, Cooper was widely criticized for her interview with Bode Miller after his bronze medal win in the super G at Rosa Khutor. During the post-event interview on February 16, Miller became increasingly emotional. Cooper repeatedly questioned him about his late brother Chelone, who had died the previous April at the age of 29, until Miller broke down in tears and was unable to continue.

For her pressing of the issue, Cooper was accused of badgering Miller. Later that evening, Miller tweeted his fans should "be gentle" with Cooper, as it was "not at all her fault," and "she asked the questions every interviewer would have." The following morning on The Today Show, Miller reiterated his support for Cooper, saying, "I have known Christin a long time, and she's a sweetheart of a person. I know she didn't mean to push. I don't think she really anticipated what my reaction was going to be, and I think by the time she realized it, it was too late. I don't blame her at all."

The race and Cooper's interview were aired by NBC in prime time on U.S. television, more than fifteen hours after its midday completion in Russia. The network had ample time to exclude that uncomfortable segment, but chose not to.

== Video ==
- 1984 Winter Olympics - Women's giant slalom – 1st run - ABC Sports on YouTube
