= Lea Sölkner =

Austrian alpine skier

Personal information
- Born: 24 December 1958 (age 67) Tauplitz, Austria

Skiing career
- Sport: Alpine skiing
- Retired: 1984
- Disciplines: Polyvalent
- World Cup debut: 1977

Olympics
- Teams: 2

World Championships
- Teams: 2
- Medals: 1 (1 gold)

World Cup
- Seasons: 8
- Wins: 1
- Podiums: 10
Medal record
Women's alpine skiing
Representing Austria
World Cup race podiums
Event	1st	2nd	3rd
Slalom	1	1	1
Giant slalom	0	1	0
Downhill	0	2	1
Combined	0	2	1
Total	1	6	3
World Championships
Gold medal – first place	1978 Garmisch	Slalom

Lea Sölkner (born 24 December 1958) is an Austrian former alpine skier who was World championship title in slalom in 1978.

== Biography ==
Born in Tauplitz, Styria.

== Career ==
During her career she has achieved 10 results among the top 3 (1 victory) in the World Cup and competed in two Olympics (1980, 1984) and two World championships (1978, 1982).

== Achievements ==
1984 Winter Olympics in Sarajevo:

- eighth place at alpine skiing Downhill

Alpine skiing World Championship 1978 in Garmisch-Partenkirchen:

- Gold at Slalom
- eleventh place at Giant slalom

Alpine skiing World Championship 1982 in Schladming:

- fourteenth at Slalom

1984 Austrian Alpine Ski Championships

- first place at alpine skiing downhill

World Cup

- 1 victory in Slalom
