= Erika Hess =

Swiss alpine skier (born 1962)

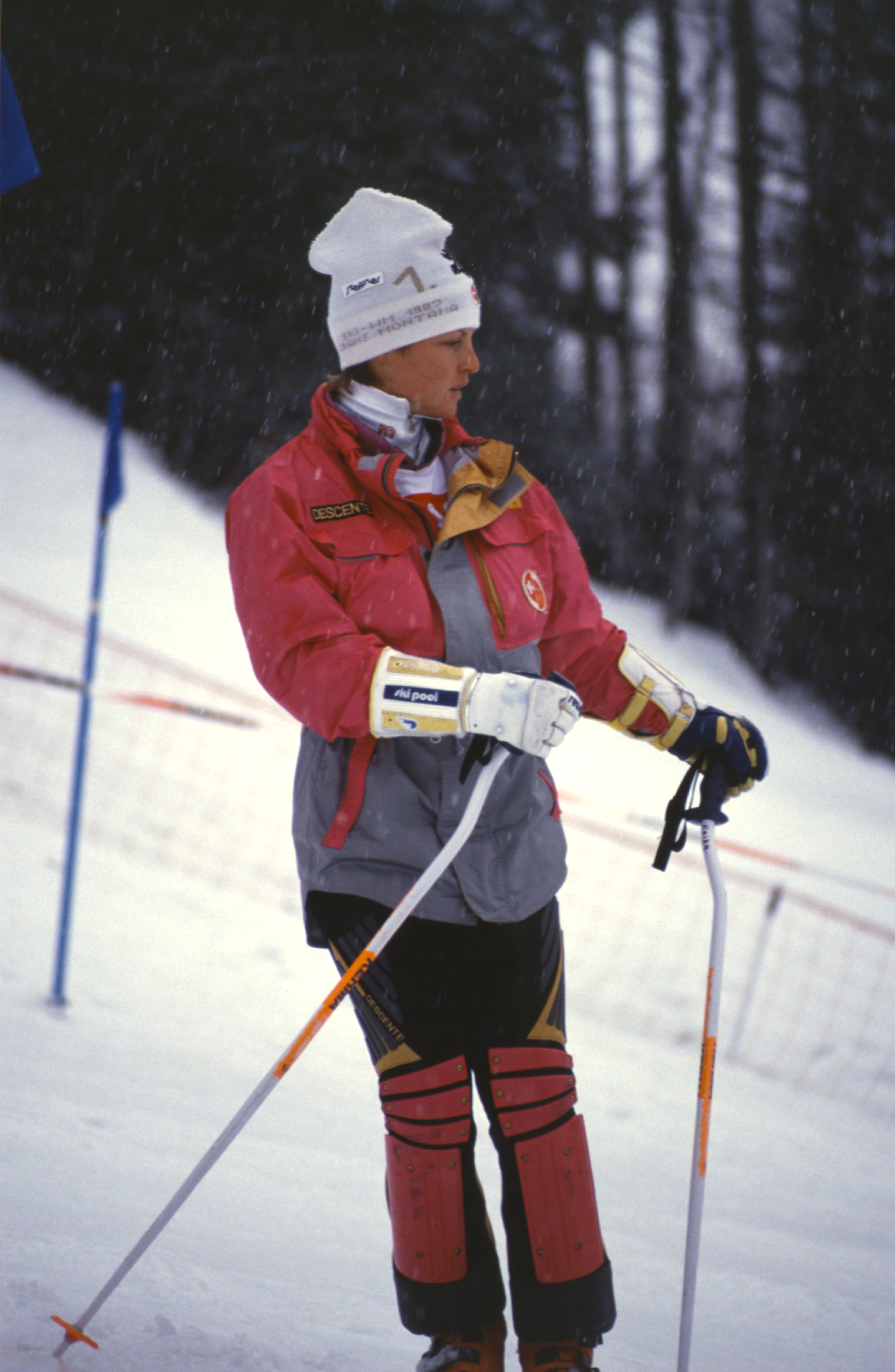
- Hess in February 1987

Personal information
- Born: 6 March 1962 (age 64) Wolfenschiessen, Nidwalden, Switzerland
- Height: 1.63 m (5 ft 4 in)

Skiing career
- Sport: Alpine skiing
- Retired: 1987
- Disciplines: Technical events
- World Cup debut: 1978

Olympics
- Teams: 2
- Medals: 1

World Championships
- Teams: 4
- Medals: 6 (6 gold)

World Cup
- Seasons: 15
- Wins: 31
- Podiums: 76
- Overall titles: 2
- Discipline titles: 6
Medal record
Women's alpine skiing
Representing Switzerland
World Cup race podiums
Event	1st	2nd	3rd
Slalom	21	1	10
Giant slalom	6	9	5
Combined	4	7	3
Total	31	17	18
International competitions
Event	1st	2nd	3rd
Olympic Games	0	0	1
World Championships	6	0	0
Total	6	0	1
Olympic Games
Bronze medal – third place	1980 Lake Placid	Slalom
World Championships
Gold medal – first place	1982 Schladming	Slalom
Gold medal – first place	1982 Schladming	Giant slalom
Gold medal – first place	1982 Schladming	Combined
Gold medal – first place	1985 Bormio	Combined
Gold medal – first place	1987 Crans Montana	Slalom
Gold medal – first place	1987 Crans Montana	Combined

Erika Hess (born 6 March 1962) is a former World Cup alpine ski racer from Switzerland. One of the best female racers of the 1980s, Hess had 31 World Cup wins (22 in slalom), four slalom titles (1981–83 and 1985), and two overall titles (1982, 1984). She also won six World Championship gold medals between 1982 and 1987, and took bronze in the slalom at the 1980 Winter Olympics at age 17. Hess missed another medal in 1985, when she led after the first run of the slalom at the "Stelvio" course at Bormio, but failed to finish the second leg.

== Biography ==
Born in Wolfenschiessen, Nidwalden, Hess' first World Cup start was at age fifteen in Berchtesgaden, West Germany, on January 25, 1978, and her first podium was on December 6, 1979, at Val-d'Isère, France. She retired at age 25 following the 1987 season with 31 World Cup victories, 76 podiums, and 146 top tens in 165 starts. She won six World Cup Slalom Races in a row from January to the season finish in March 1981.

Hess was awarded with the »Skieur d’Or« (»The ski racer in gold«, later named "Serge Lang Trophy" - named after Serge Lang - an award given by "The Association Internationale des Journalistes de Ski", an international Consortium of journalists competent for ski sports) on November 22, 1982 (5 points ahead to Phil Mahre). She tied for the slalom title in 1986, but was runner-up to Roswitha Steiner due to the tiebreaker: Steiner had four slalom wins and Hess had two.

Her cousin Monika Hess (b. 1964) also was an alpine ski racer.

She explained her retirement in an article in the newspaper Sport that an important reason for her career end before Calgary 1988 was the factors given at the Olympic Games such as weather, hustle and bustle, nervous pressure, which weigh many times more heavily at the Olympics than at a normal race. She had not been able to cope with these circumstances.

Hess married Jacques Reymond (her trainer); the couple and three sons were living at Saint-Légier-La Chiésaz in Vaud at the time of Reymond's death in May 2020 (due to COVID-19).

Erika is organizing races and training camps for upcoming ski racers.

== World Cup results ==
=== Season titles ===
Season	Discipline
1981	Slalom
1982	Overall
1982	Slalom
1983	Slalom
1984	Overall
1984	Giant slalom
1984	Combined
1985	Slalom

=== Season standings ===
Season	Age	Overall	Slalom	Giant Slalom	Super G	Downhill	Combined
1978	15	28	16	21	not run	—	—
1979	16	15	18	10	not run	—	—
1980	17	7	6	5	not run	—	—
1981	18	2	1	3	not run	34	4
1982	19	1	1	3	not run	35	2
1983	20	3	1	4	not awarded (w/ GS)	—	4
1984	21	1	4	1	not awarded (w/ GS)	35	1
1985	22	4	1	12	not awarded (w/ GS)	—	5
1986	23	2	2	7	20	25	2
1987	24	4	3	4	18	32	3

=== Race victories ===
- 31 wins – (21 SL, 6 GS, 4 K)
- 76 podiums – (42 SL, 20 GS, 14 K)

Season	Date	Location	Race
1981	13 January 1981	Schruns, Austria	Slalom
1981	21 January 1981	Crans-Montana, Switzerland	Slalom
1981	31 January 1981	Les Diablerets, Switzerland	Slalom
1981	3 February 1981	Zwiesel, West Germany	Slalom
1981	15 March 1981	Furano, Japan	Slalom
1981	24 March 1981	Wangs–Pizol, Switzerland	Slalom
1981	25 March 1981	Wangs–Pizol, Switzerland	Giant slalom
1982	13 December 1981	Piancavallo, Italy	Slalom
1982	21 December 1981	St. Gervais, France	Slalom
1982	3 January 1982	(Socialist Federal Republic of Yugoslavia) Maribor, Yugoslavia	Slalom
1982	20 January 1982	Bad Gastein, Austria	Slalom
1982	20 January 1982	Bad Gastein, Austria	Combined
1982	(Austria) 1982 World Championships		
1982	20 March 1982	L'Alpe d'Huez, France	Giant slalom
1982	21 March 1982	L'Alpe d'Huez, France	Slalom
1983	8 December 1982	Val-d'Isère, France	Giant slalom
1983	17 December 1982	Piancavallo, Italy	Slalom
1983	9 February 1983	(Socialist Federal Republic of Yugoslavia) Maribor, Yugoslavia	Slalom
1984	1 December 1983	(Socialist Federal Republic of Yugoslavia) Kranjska Gora, Yugoslavia	Slalom
1984	11 December 1983	Val-d'Isère, France	Giant slalom
1984	14 December 1983	Sestriere, Italy	Combined
1984	15 January 1984	(Socialist Federal Republic of Yugoslavia) Maribor, Yugoslavia	Slalom
1984	22 January 1984	Verbier, Switzerland	Combined
1984	29 January 1984	St. Gervais, France	Giant slalom
1984	17 March 1984	Jasná, Czechoslovakia	Giant slalom
1985	19 March 1985	(United States) Park City, UT, USA	Slalom
1985	(Italy) 1985 World Championships		
1985	22 March 1985	(United States) Heavenly Valley, CA, USA	Slalom
1986	12 December 1985	Sestriere, Italy	Combined
1986	15 December 1985	Savognin, Switzerland	Slalom
1986	11 March 1986	(United States) Park City, UT, USA	Slalom
1987	5 December 1986	(United States) Waterville Valley, NH, USA	Slalom
1987	21 December 1986	Val Zoldana, Italy	Slalom
1987	(Switzerland) 1987 World Championships		

== World Championship results ==
Year	Age	Slalom	Giant Slalom	Super-G	Downhill	Combined
1978	15	—	9	not run	—	—
1980	17	3	DNF2	not run	—	—
1982	19	1	1	not run	—	1
1985	22	DNF2	11	not run	—	1
1987	24	1	—	—	7	1

From 1948 through 1980, the Winter Olympics were also the World Championships for alpine skiing.
At the World Championships from 1954 through 1980, the combined was a "paper race" using the results of the three events (DH, GS, SL).

== Olympic results ==
Year	Age	Slalom	Giant Slalom	Super-G	Downhill	Combined
1980	17	3	DNF2	not run	—	not run
1984	21	5	7	not run	—	not run

== See also ==
- List of FIS Alpine Ski World Cup women's race winners

Awards
Preceded by Denise Biellmann	Swiss Sportswoman of the Year; 1982	Succeeded by Doris de Agostini
