= Metka Jerman =

Slovenian alpine skier (born 1963)

Personal information
- Nationality: Slovenian
- Born: 23 January 1963 (age 62); Ljubljana, Yugoslavia

Sport
- Sport: Alpine skiing

Metka Jerman (born 23 January 1963) is a Slovenian alpine skier. She competed in two events at the 1980 Winter Olympics, representing Yugoslavia.
