= Daniela Zini =

Italian alpine skier

Personal information
- Born: 30 May 1959 (age 67) Livigno, Italy

Skiing career
- Sport: Alpine skiing
- Retired: 1986
- Disciplines: Technical events
- World Cup debut: 1978

Olympics
- Teams: 2
- Medals: 0

World Championships
- Teams: 2
- Medals: 1

World Cup
- Seasons: 8
- Wins: 2
- Podiums: 11
Medal record
World Cup race podiums
| Event | 1st | 2nd | 3rd |
|---|---|---|---|
| Slalom | 2 | 3 | 5 |
| Giant slalom | 0 | 1 | 0 |
| Total | 2 | 4 | 5 |
World Championships
| Bronze medal – third place | 1982 Schladming | Slalom |

Daniela Zini (born 30 May 1959) is a former Italian alpine skier.

== Career ==
During her career she has achieved 8 results among the top 3 (2 victories) in the World Cup.

== World Cup victories ==
| Date | Location | Race |
|---|---|---|
| March 9, 1980 | (Czechoslovakia) Vysoké Tatry | Slalom |
| January 23, 1984 | (Italy) Limone | Slalom |

== National titles ==
Zini has won six national championships at individual senior level.

- Italian Alpine Ski Championships
  - Slalom: 1980, 1981, 1982 (3)
  - Giant slalom: 1982, 1984 (2)
  - Combined: 1982
