= Élisabeth Chaud =

French alpine skier (born 1960)

Élisabeth Chaud (born 7 December 1960 in Puy-Saint-Vincent) is a French retired alpine skier who competed in the 1984 Winter Olympics.
