= Maria Epple =

German alpine skier (born 1959)

Maria Epple (born 11 March 1959) is a retired alpine skier from Seeg, Bavaria, Germany. She is the 1978 giant slalom world champion. She is the sister of Irene Epple.

Awards
Preceded by (Germany) Eva Wilms	German Sportswoman of the Year; 1978	Succeeded by (Germany) Christa Kinshofer
