= Ingrid Eberle =

Austrian alpine skier (born 1957)

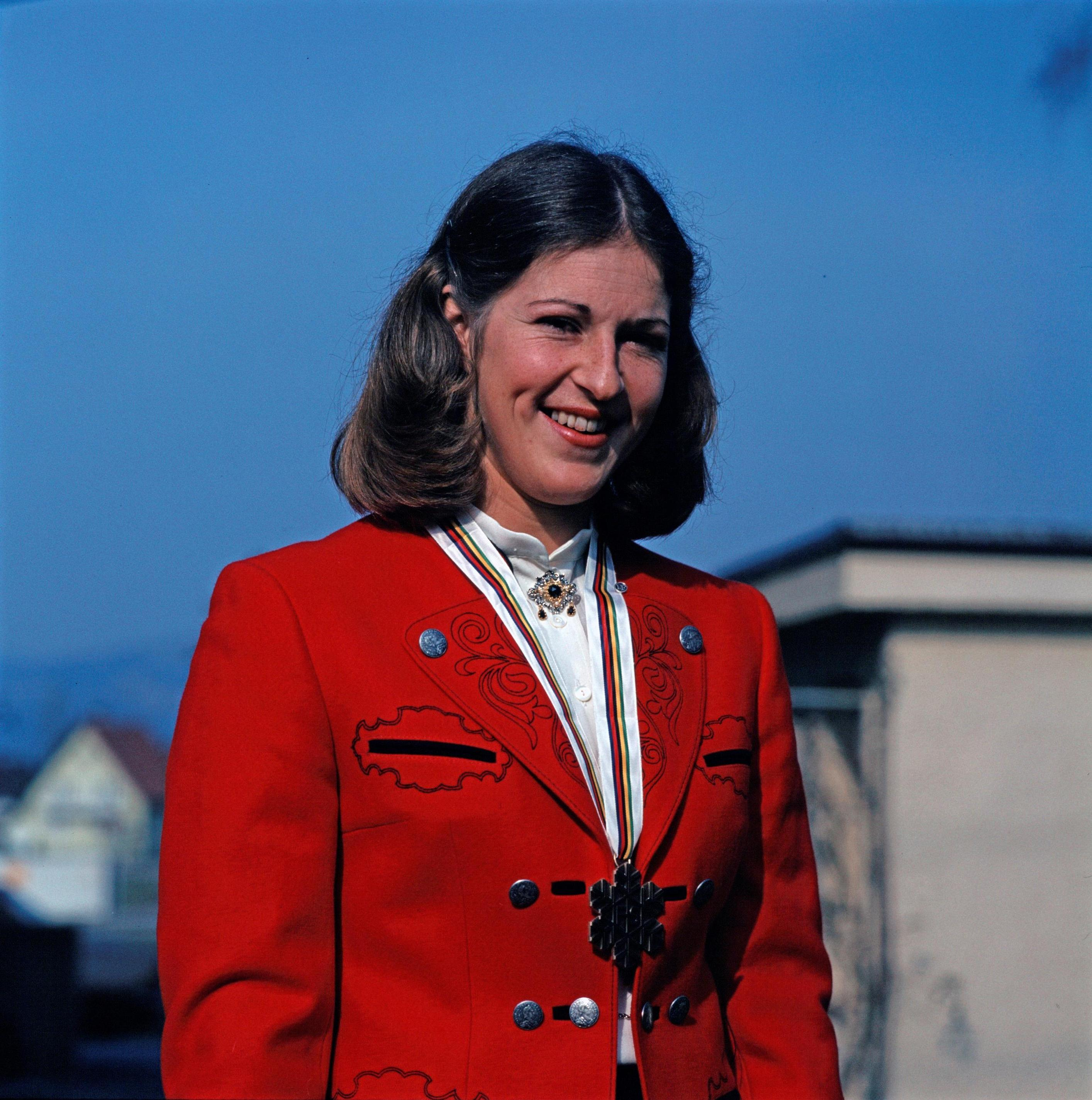

Medal record

Women's alpine skiing

Representing Austria

World Championships
Bronze medal – third place	1980 Lake Placid	Combined

Ingrid Eberle (born 3 June 1957 in Dornbirn) is a retired Austrian alpine skier who competed in the 1980 Winter Olympics.
