= Irene Epple =

German alpine skier (born 1957)

Personal information
- Born: 18 June 1957 (age 69) Seeg, Bavaria, West Germany
- Height: 1.65 m (5 ft 5 in)
- Weight: 60 kg (132 lb)

Sport
- Sport: Alpine skiing
- Club: TSV Seeg
Medal record
Representing West Germany
Winter Olympics
Silver medal – second place	1980 Lake Placid	Giant slalom
World Championships
Silver medal – second place	1978 Garmisch-Partenkirchen	Downhill

Irene Epple-Waigel (German pronunciation: [iˈʁeːnə ˈʔɛplə ˈvaɪɡl̩]; born 18 June 1957) is a German former alpine skier. She won a total of 11 Alpine Skiing World Cup races and two World Cups, in giant slalom and combined (both in 1982). She also won a silver medal at the 1980 Winter Olympic Games in giant slalom. In the 1978 FIS Alpine Skiing World Championships at Garmisch-Partenkirchen she won the silver medal in the downhill. On 9 January 1983 she won the first women's World Cup Super-G race, held in Verbier.

In 1992, she completed her medical studies at LMU Munich, and in November 1994 married Theo Waigel, who was the German Finance Minister from 1989 to 1998. In 1980, she was named the German Sportswoman of the Year. She is the sister of alpine skier Maria Epple.

== World Cup victories ==
Date	Location	Race
12 March 1980	(Austria) Saalbach	Giant slalom
3 December 1980	(France) Val d'Isère	Giant slalom
6 December 1981	(France) Val d'Isère	Giant slalom
10 December 1981	(Italy) Pila	Giant slalom
18 December 1981	(Italy) Piancavallo	Combined
8 January 1982	(Germany) Pfronten	Giant slalom
14 January 1982	(Germany) Pfronten	Combined
4 March 1982	(United States) Waterville Valley	Giant slalom
9 January 1983	(Switzerland) Verbier	Super-G
7 December 1983	(France) Val d'Isère	Downhill
11 December 1983	(France) Val d'Isère	Combined

Awards
Preceded by (Germany) Christa Kinshofer	German Sportswoman of the Year; 1980	Succeeded by (Germany) Ulrike Meyfarth
