= Christa Kinshofer =

German alpine skier

Personal information
- Born: 24 January 1961 (age 65) Munich, West Germany
- Height: 1.72

Skiing career
- Sport: Alpine skiing
- Club: SC Miesbach
- Disciplines: Polyvalent

World Cup
- Wins: 7
- Podiums: 17
- Discipline titles: 1
Medal record
Women's alpine skiing
Representing West Germany
World Cup race podiums
Event	1st	2nd	3rd
Slalom	1	4	0
Giant slalom	5	2	1
Downhill	0	0	1
Combined	1	0	2
Total	7	6	4
International competitions
Event	1st	2nd	3rd
Olympic Games	0	2	1
World Championships	0	1	0
Total	0	3	1
Olympic Games
Silver medal – second place	1980 Lake Placid	Slalom
Silver medal – second place	1988 Calgary	Giant slalom
Bronze medal – third place	1988 Calgary	Slalom

Christa Kinshofer-Rembeck (née Kinshofer; German pronunciation: [ˈkʁɪsta ˈkɪnsˌhoːfɐ]; born 24 January 1961) is a German former alpine ski racer and businesswoman. In her career she won three Olympic medals, one World Championship medal and seven World Cup races.

== Biography ==
Christa Kinshofer was born as daughter of Alfred and Maria Kinshofer in Munich. She grew up with three brothers and sisters in the Bavarian town Miesbach, where the parents were running a successful engineering company. As a child she also competed in figure skating. In 1966 she became member of SC Miesbach. With figure skating, she was "Kids Champion" in Munich at the age of 8. She concentrated already as a child on alpine ski races. From 1971 on, she participated in races, whilst attending high school in Berchtesgaden. She was West German youth champion several times. She scored her first World Cup points in the 1977 season with a tenth place in slalom. Her breakthrough came in the 1979 season, when she won 5 World Cup giant slaloms in a row.

In 1979 Kinshofer was voted as Sportswoman of the year in West Germany. One year later she won the silver medal in slalom at the Olympic Games in Lake Placid. Kinshofer was lying in second position of the overall world cup when a serious accident, which resulted in a fracture in her right ankle, forced her to a break of 11 months. She fell out with the West German Ski Federation (DSV) because of different opinions about training methods, and was therefore forced to leave the DSV. At that point, she switched to the Dutch national ski team. Because of deprivation of all FIS World ranking list points, she had to start amongst the last starting numbers. (Nr.124)

Kinshofer's comeback started with the victory of the international German Championship, although she still started for the Netherlands. The DSV called the "Lost Daughter" back into the German national team, appreciating her achievements. She won the World Cup Slalom in Piancavallo and could qualify in 4 events for the 1988 Olympic Games in Calgary.

In 1988 in Calgary, she was even more successful: she won silver in the giant slalom and one day later bronze in slalom, both times behind Vreni Schneider. After that she retired from skiing. This decision was also based on an injury of the intervertebral disc. Because of her talent, to sell and articulate in front of camera, she was offered several advertising contracts. During her career, she was called "Glamour Girl" and "Hollywood Christa" by the media.

== Later careers ==
After her skiing career, Kinshofer worked as a TV commentator for multiple sport channels and as an expert with the Bild magazine. She opened a sport shop for kids in Munich. Together with her sister she founded the company Kinsi Sports.

In 2001 she became a book writer ("Fit for success 2001"), followed by the autobiography "Helden werden nicht gewürfelt" in 2010. She works as a motivational trainer and international keynote speaker in the area of sports marketing and sponsoring. She organises golf tournaments and ski/snow events. Additionally, she stands up as a guide for kids and young persons with the foundation "Laureus Sport for Good" In 2005 she was involved in the opening of SkiDubai. Kinshofer is married since 2009 with the orthopedist Dr. med. Erich Rembeck. Christa Kinshofer has twin daughters, born in 1992, from her first marriage. Since November 2012, she runs together with her husband the Christa Kinshofer Skiclinic in Munich.

== World Cup victories ==
=== Overall victories ===
Season	Discipline
1979 Alpine Skiing World Cup	Giant slalom

Medals	Gold	Silver	Bronce
Olympic Winter Games		2x	1x
World Championship		1x	

=== Individual victories ===
Date	Location	Race
18 December 1978	(France) Val d'Isère	Giant slalom
7 January 1979	(France) Les Gets	Giant slalom
6 February 1979	(West Germany) Berchtesgaden	Giant slalom
8 March 1979	(United States) Aspen	Giant slalom
11 March 1979	(United States) Heavenly	Giant slalom
21 January 1981	(Switzerland) Crans-Montana	Combined
19 December 1987	(Italy) Piancavallo	Slalom

== Europa Cup results ==
Kinshofer, representing Holland in that season for differences with the German federation, has won an overall Europa Cup and two specialty standings.

- FIS Alpine Ski Europa Cup
  - Overall: 1987
  - Giant slalom: 1987
  - Super-G: 1987

Awards
Preceded by (Germany) Maria Epple	German Sportswoman of the Year; 1979	Succeeded by (Germany) Irene Epple
