= Waterville Valley Resort =

Ski resort in New Hampshire

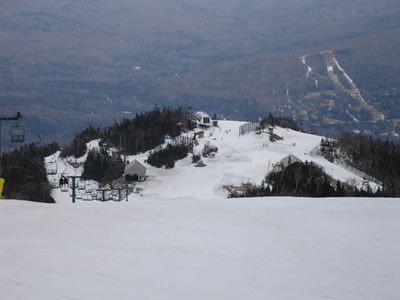
- Top of Highcountry Double, south shoulder of Mount Tecumseh

- Location in New Hampshire Waterville Valley Resort (New Hampshire)
- Location: Waterville Valley, New Hampshire, U.S.
- Nearest city: Plymouth – 20 miles (32 km)
- Coordinates: 43°57′55″N 71°31′40″W
- Vertical: 2,020 ft (615 m)
- Top elevation: 3,840 ft (1,170 m) (lift-served); 3,997 ft (1,218 m) (summit)
- Base elevation: 1,820 ft (555 m)
- Skiable area: 265 acres (1.07 km^{2})
- Trails: 62; 15% Novice; 59% Intermediate; 26% Expert
- Longest run: 1.9 miles (3.1 km)
- Lift system: 1 HS 6-Pack, 2 Triples, 2 Doubles, 1 Platterpull, 2 T-Bar, 2 Conveyor Belt
- Terrain parks: 6
- Snowfall: 148 inches (12.3 ft; 3.8 m)
- Snowmaking: 100%
- Night skiing: yes
- Website: www.waterville.com

Waterville Valley Resort is a ski resort located in Waterville Valley, New Hampshire, in the White Mountain National Forest of the northeastern United States. The resort features approximately 265 acres of skiable terrain, 62 trails, and 10 lifts, including two high speed lifts, a quad and a six pack, with a vertical drop of 2,020 feet. It operates within the planned resort community of Waterville Valley and is accessible from Interstate 93. The alpine ski area is located on Mount Tecumseh and the slopes primarily face east and northeast.

The resort offers a range of terrain for beginner, intermediate, and advanced skiers and snowboarders, with approximately 15% beginner, 59% intermediate, and 26% advanced/expert trails. Snowmaking covers approximately 100% of the mountain’s terrain. Waterville Valley is located approximately 130 miles north of Boston, Massachusetts, and is part of the Indy Pass network.

In addition to alpine skiing operations, the resort and surrounding village support year-round recreational activities, including 46 miles (74 km) of Nordic skiing, hiking, mountain biking, golf, tennis, gaming simulators, axe-throwing, bowling and arcade games, and events.

== History ==
Organized skiing first started on Mount Tecumseh in the 1930s with the construction of two Civilian Conservation Corps ski trails. The first of the two trails was abandoned after a decade, while the latter would later become incorporated into the Waterville Valley ski area.

A group led by Tom Corcoran opened Waterville Valley 60 years ago in 1966 with four new Stadeli double chairlifts and a J-Bar surface lift. Of the original chairlifts, only the Lower Meadows remains.

Over the next few decades, three Stadeli triple chairlifts were installed, including the World Cup Triple in 1985.

In 1988, a Poma high-speed detachable quad chairlift was installed, running parallel to the World Cup Triple and High Country Double chairlifts. Due to wind issues, the upper portion of this lift was later removed. As a result, the top portion of the ski area is only served by the High Country T-Bar lift. In 1997, a Doppelmayr high speed detachable quad chairlift was installed, known as "Quadzilla". Debuting in the 2022/2023 season, the Tecumseh Express six person bubble chairlift opened, replacing the old quad lift as the main chairlift at the resort. For the 2025-2026 season, a new 2,277 foot Exhibition T-bar with a capacity of 1,100 passengers per hour was built, replacing the existing Exhibition and World Cup surface lifts.

In 2013, Waterville Valley received authorization from the U.S. Forest Service to begin work on an expansion program, dubbed the "Green Peak Project". This expansion marked the first major expansion at the resort in over 30 years. Midway through the 2016/2017 season the project was complete, increasing the skiable size of the resort by almost 20% (from 220 to 265 acres). This new terrain is serviced by a fixed grip triple lift.

=== Ownership ===
After filing for bankruptcy protection in the summer of 1994, Waterville Valley was briefly owned by the American Skiing Company in the mid-1990s. Due to anti-trust issues, Waterville and Cranmore Mountain Resort were sold to California-based Booth Creek Ski Holdings in the fall of 1996. Members of the Sununu family of New Hampshire and a group of area investors purchased the resort in October 2010 and it remains independent.

=== Professional events ===
Waterville Valley first hosted World Cup alpine events in slalom and giant slalom in 1969 and was a regular stop on the tour for most of the 1980s. The 1969 races saw American women take four of the six podium positions, as Kiki Cutter won the slalom for her fourth World Cup win and Judy Nagel took third. Two days earlier, Marilyn Cochran and Karen Budge tied for second in the giant slalom. After two podiums at Waterville Valley in 1982, Tamara McKinney won five consecutive World Cup events at the resort from 1983 to 1985. The most recent WC races were held 35 years ago, with six events in March to conclude the 1991 season.

The circuit did not return to the eastern U.S. for over a quarter century, until November 2016 at Killington, Vermont, with women's technical events (giant slalom, slalom) on Thanksgiving weekend.

Waterville Valley has long embraced freestyle skiing and freestyle snowboarding, building the first terrain park in New Hampshire, known as the Boneyard, as well as an early mogul competition in 1971. During the 2023-2024 season, Waterville Valley would host its first ever freestyle world cup, and first world cup since 1991, with a mogul event on January 26th, and a dual mogul event on January 27th, the first time a dual mogul competition had been held on American soil. This competition would be followed up the next two years with two more world cup events, with competitions again in the mogul and dual mogul discipline.

== Clubs and schools ==
Waterville Valley hosts the "Black and Blue Trail Smashers" (also known as BBTS) ski club, one of the oldest in the USA, founded in 1934. The team has expanded its training to include ski racing, freestyle skiing and snowboarding, and boardercross disciplines. WVBBTS has received many prestigious awards since its inception, including the USSA Club of the Year award in 2006. It is the "home club" of Olympic gold medalist Hannah Kearney, winner of the women's moguls in 2010.

Waterville Valley Academy (WVA), a seasonal winter sports boarding school that specializes in training skiers and snowboarders, conducts training at Waterville. WVA is a subsidiary of the Waterville Valley BBTS ski club, using many of the club's resources and staff in its operations.

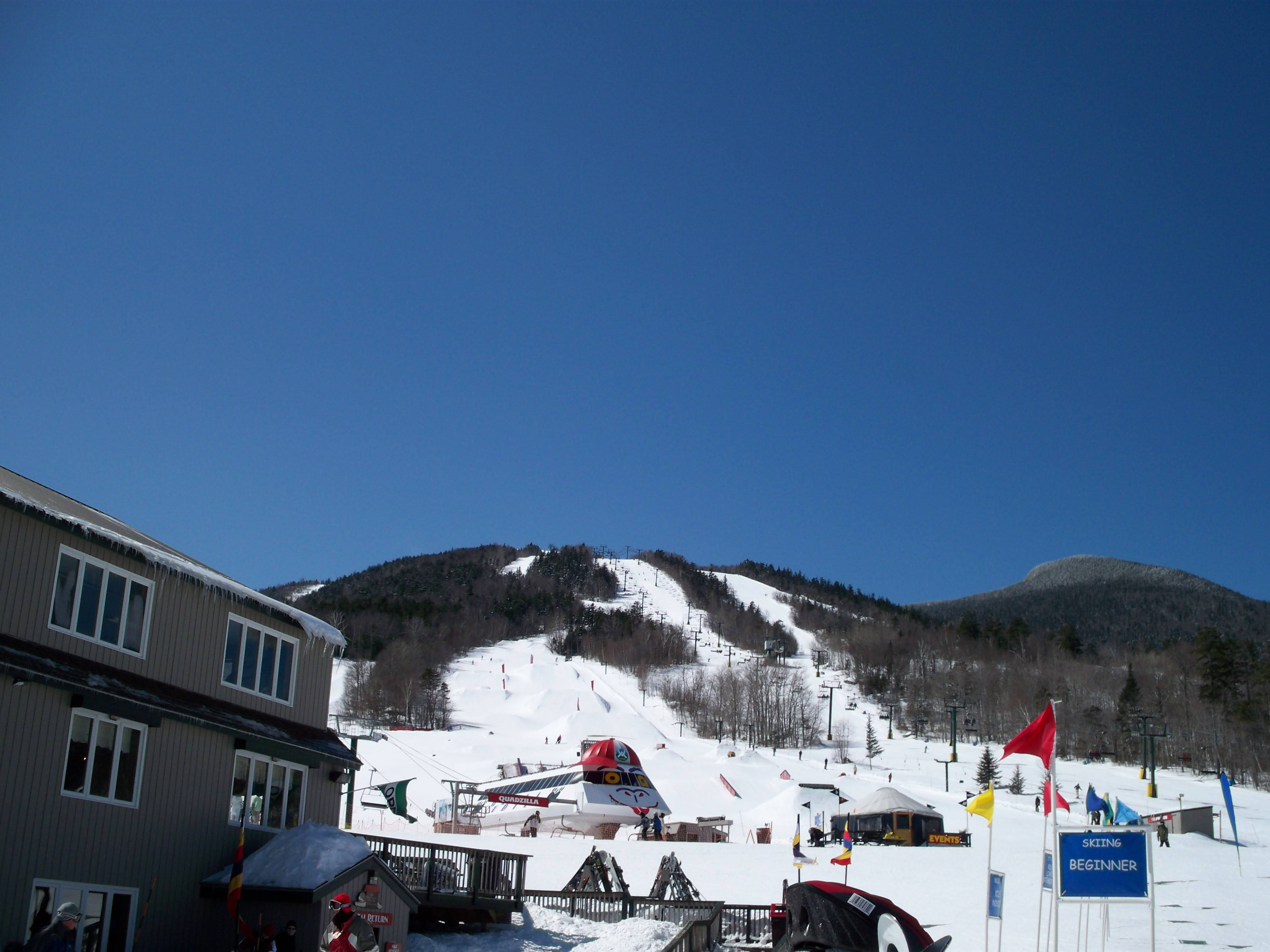

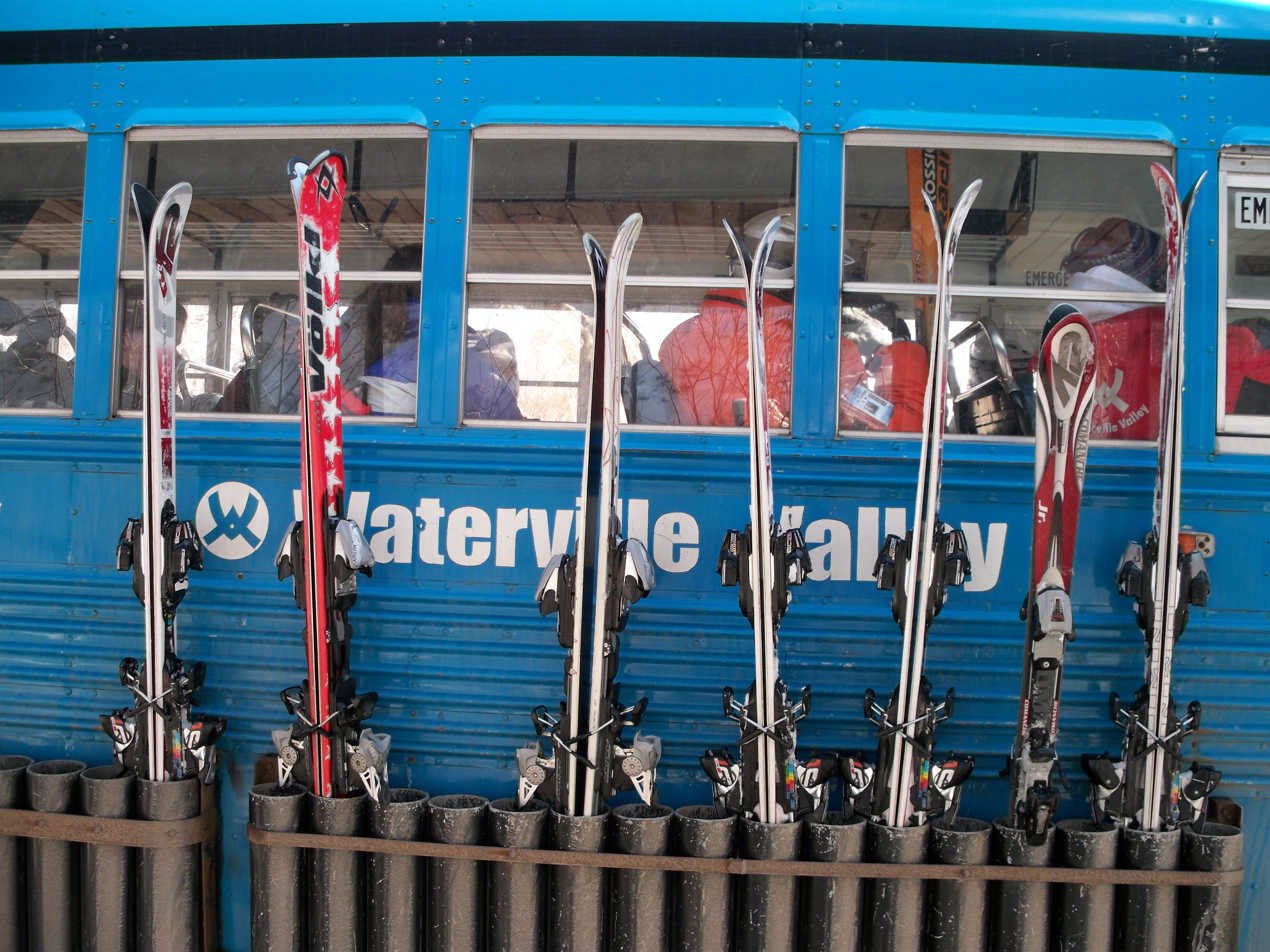

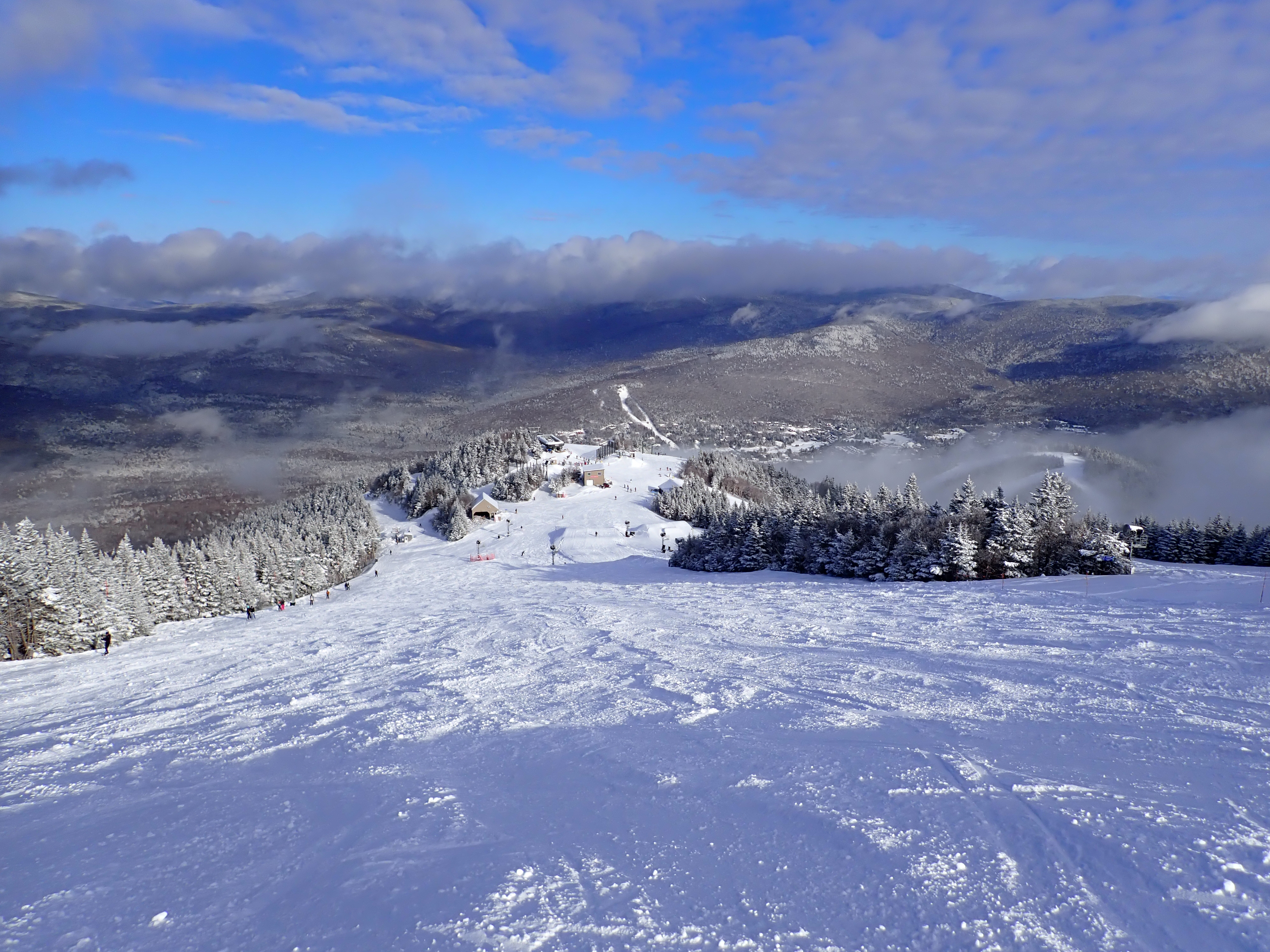
