= 1983–84 FIS Alpine Ski World Cup =

International sports competition

FIS Alpine Ski World Cup 1983/84
Discipline	Men	Women
Overall	(Switzerland) Pirmin Zurbriggen	(Switzerland) Erika Hess
Downhill	(Switzerland) Urs Räber	(Switzerland) Maria Walliser
Giant slalom/Super G	(Sweden) Ingemar Stenmark	(Switzerland) Erika Hess
Slalom	(Luxembourg) Marc Girardelli	(United States) Tamara McKinney
Combined	(Liechtenstein) Andreas Wenzel	(Switzerland) Erika Hess
Nations Cup	Austria	Switzerland
- Nations Cup overall: Switzerland

Competition
Locations	22	18
Individual	37	34

The 18th World Cup season began in December 1983 in Kranjska Gora, Yugoslavia (now Slovenia), and concluded in March 1984 in Oslo, Norway. The overall champions were Pirmin Zurbriggen (his first) and Erika Hess (her second), both of Switzerland.

A break in the schedule in February was for the 1984 Winter Olympics in Sarajevo, Yugoslavia (now Bosnia and Herzegovina). The debate over amateur and professional status of world-class skiers came to a head this year over the issue of the Olympic eligibility of the holders of FIS Class B licenses, which were approved in 1981 to permit skiers to accept sponsorship money directly instead of through their national ski federations or Olympic committees. After protests by some of the other top skiers (including twin brothers Phil and Steve Mahre), the International Ski Federation (FIS) ruled in the summer of 1983 that the two holders of such licenses, Ingemar Stenmark of Sweden and Hanni Wenzel of Liechtenstein, would be ineligible to compete in the Olympics unless they surrendered those licenses and transferred the money received under them to the appropriate national ski or Olympic committees.

Although Wenzel was willing to transfer her money as requested, Stenmark, who had moved his tax residence to Monaco and had received an amount estimated at over $5 million in payments during those three years, was not, because repatriating the money to Sweden would subject him to millions of dollars in Swedish income tax. Despite the different reactions of the two, FIS decided to treat Stenmark and Wenzel identically and ban them both from Olympic competition in 1984, while permitting both to continue to compete in World Cup competitions. After the Olympics, Hanni Wenzel, who had won two overall World Cup titles and finished second or third overall six more times, retired, and several of the other top skiers, such as the Mahre twins and Norway's Jarle Halsnes, turned professional and left the World Cup circuit. The backlash over this series of events, combined with the increasing television revenues from the Olympic Games, led to the end of the ban on professional athletes in the Olympics before the end of the decade.

In another ruling regarding Olympic eligibility, FIS denied rising all-event skier Marc Girardelli, who was a citizen of Austria but who competed for Luxembourg on the World Cup circuit, the ability to compete in the Olympics for Austria, ruling that he could only compete for the country that he represented on the World Cup circuit. As a result, Girardelli was not able to compete in the Olympics until after his Luxembourg citizenship was granted in the mid-1980s.

== Calendar ==
=== Men ===
Event key: DH – Downhill, SL – Slalom, GS – Giant slalom, SG – Super giant slalom, KB – Combined, PS – Parallel slalom (Nations Cup ranking only)
Race	Season	Date	Place	Type	Winner	Second	Third
451	1	2 December 1983	(Socialist Federal Republic of Yugoslavia) Kranjska Gora	SL _{146}	(Liechtenstein) Andreas Wenzel	(Bulgaria) Petar Popangelov	(Liechtenstein) Paul Frommelt
452	2	4 December 1983	(Austria) Schladming	DH _{134}	(Austria) Erwin Resch	(Austria) Harti Weirather	(Canada) Steve Podborski
453	3	9 December 1983	(France) Val d'Isère	DH _{135}	(Switzerland) Franz Heinzer	(Canada) Todd Brooker	(Austria) Harti Weirather
454	4	10 December 1983	(France) Val d'Isère	SG _{004}	(Austria) Hans Enn	(Switzerland) Pirmin Zurbriggen	(Socialist Federal Republic of Yugoslavia) Jure Franko
455	5	10 December 1983	(France) Val d'Isère	KB _{033}	(Switzerland) Franz Heinzer	(Switzerland) Pirmin Zurbriggen	(Austria) Leonhard Stock
456	6	12 December 1983	(Switzerland) Les Diablerets	GS _{137}	(Switzerland) Max Julen	(Switzerland) Pirmin Zurbriggen	(Socialist Federal Republic of Yugoslavia) Jure Franko
457	7	13 December 1983	(Italy) Courmayeur	SL _{147}	(Sweden) Ingemar Stenmark	(Socialist Federal Republic of Yugoslavia) Bojan Križaj	(United States) Steve Mahre
458	8	18 December 1983	(Italy) Val Gardena	DH _{136}	(Switzerland) Urs Räber	(Canada) Todd Brooker	(Canada) Steve Podborski
459	9	19 December 1983	(Italy) Val Gardena	SG _{005}	(Switzerland) Pirmin Zurbriggen	(Switzerland) Martin Hangl	(Austria) Leonhard Stock
460	10	20 December 1983	(Italy) Madonna di Campiglio	SL _{148}	(Sweden) Ingemar Stenmark	(Austria) Robert Zoller	(Bulgaria) Petar Popangelov
461	11	19 December 1983; 20 December 1983	(Italy) Val Gardena (SG) (Italy) Madonna di Campiglio (SL)	KB _{034}	(Liechtenstein) Andreas Wenzel	(Switzerland) Thomas Bürgler	(Italy) Alex Giorgi
462	12	7 January 1984	(Switzerland) Laax	DH _{137}	(Switzerland) Urs Räber	(Austria) Franz Klammer	(Italy) Michael Mair
463	13	10 January 1984	(Switzerland) Adelboden	GS _{138}	(Sweden) Ingemar Stenmark	(Austria) Hubert Strolz	(Switzerland) Pirmin Zurbriggen
464	14	15 January 1984	(Switzerland) Wengen	DH _{138}	(United States) Bill Johnson	(Austria) Anton Steiner	(Austria) Erwin Resch
465	15	16 January 1984	(Switzerland) Parpan	SL _{149}	(Luxembourg) Marc Girardelli	(Italy) Paolo De Chiesa	(Liechtenstein) Andreas Wenzel
466	16	17 January 1984	(Switzerland) Parpan	SL _{150}	(Sweden) Ingemar Stenmark	(Luxembourg) Marc Girardelli	(Austria) Franz Gruber
467	17	15 January 1984; 17 January 1984	(Switzerland) Wengen (DH) (Switzerland) Parpan (SL)	KB _{035}	(Liechtenstein) Andreas Wenzel	(Austria) Anton Steiner	(Switzerland) Peter Lüscher
468	18	21 January 1984	(Austria) Kitzbühel	DH _{139}	(Austria) Franz Klammer	(Austria) Erwin Resch	(Austria) Anton Steiner
469	19	22 January 1984	(Austria) Kitzbühel	SL _{151}	(Luxembourg) Marc Girardelli	(Austria) Franz Gruber	(Socialist Federal Republic of Yugoslavia) Bojan Križaj
470	20	22 January 1984	(Austria) Kitzbühel	KB _{036}	(Austria) Anton Steiner	(Switzerland) Pirmin Zurbriggen	(United States) Phil Mahre
471	21	23 January 1984	(Austria) Kirchberg	GS _{139}	(Sweden) Ingemar Stenmark	(Luxembourg) Marc Girardelli	(Sweden) Jörgen Sundqvist
472	22	28 January 1984	(West Germany) Garmisch	DH _{140}	(Canada) Steve Podborski	(Austria) Erwin Resch	(Austria) Franz Klammer
473	23	29 January 1984	(West Germany) Garmisch	SG _{006}	(Liechtenstein) Andreas Wenzel	(Switzerland) Pirmin Zurbriggen	(Austria) Hans Enn
474	24	29 January 1984	(West Germany) Garmisch	KB _{037}	(Switzerland) Pirmin Zurbriggen	(Liechtenstein) Andreas Wenzel	(Switzerland) Peter Müller
475	25	2 February 1984	(Italy) Cortina d'Ampezzo	DH _{141}	(Austria) Helmut Höflehner	(Switzerland) Urs Räber	(Switzerland) Conradin Cathomen
476	26	4 February 1984	(Bulgaria) Borovets	GS _{140}	(Sweden) Ingemar Stenmark	(Luxembourg) Marc Girardelli	(Italy) Roberto Erlacher
477	27	5 February 1984	(Bulgaria) Borovets	SL _{152}	(Luxembourg) Marc Girardelli	(Sweden) Ingemar Stenmark	(Austria) Franz Gruber
1984 Winter Olympics (13–19 February)
478	28	4 March 1984	(United States) Aspen	DH _{142}	(United States) Bill Johnson	(Austria) Anton Steiner (Austria) Helmut Höflehner	
479	29	5 March 1984	(United States) Aspen	GS _{141}	(Switzerland) Pirmin Zurbriggen	(Luxembourg) Marc Girardelli	(United States) Phil Mahre
480	30	6 March 1984	(United States) Vail	SL _{153}	(Austria) Robert Zoller	(Bulgaria) Petar Popangelov	(Sweden) Lars-Göran Halvarsson (United States) Phil Mahre
481	31	7 March 1984	(United States) Vail	GS _{142}	(Sweden) Ingemar Stenmark	(Switzerland) Pirmin Zurbriggen	(Austria) Hans Enn
482	32	11 March 1984	(Canada) Whistler	DH _{143}	(United States) Bill Johnson	(Austria) Helmut Höflehner	(Switzerland) Pirmin Zurbriggen
483	33	17 March 1984	(Sweden) Åre	GS _{143}	(Austria) Hans Enn	(Austria) Hubert Strolz	(Sweden) Ingemar Stenmark
484	34	18 March 1984	(Sweden) Åre	SL _{154}	(Luxembourg) Marc Girardelli	(Austria) Franz Gruber	(Sweden) Lars-Göran Halvarsson
485	35	20 March 1984	(Norway) Oppdal	SG _{007}	(Switzerland) Pirmin Zurbriggen	(Luxembourg) Marc Girardelli	(Socialist Federal Republic of Yugoslavia) Jure Franko
486	36	23 March 1984	(Norway) Oslo	GS _{144}	(Austria) Hans Enn	(Italy) Alex Giorgi	(Switzerland) Thomas Bürgler
487	37	24 March 1984	(Norway) Oslo	SL _{155}	(Luxembourg) Marc Girardelli	(Sweden) Ingemar Stenmark	(Italy) Paolo De Chiesa
Nations Cup		25 March 1984	(Norway) Oslo	PS _{ncr}	(Austria) Hans Enn	(Austria) Anton Steiner	(Sweden) Ingemar Stenmark

=== Women ===
Event key: DH – Downhill, SL – Slalom, GS – Giant slalom, SG – Super giant slalom, KB – Combined, PS – Parallel slalom (Nations Cup ranking only)
Race	Season	Date	Place	Type	Winner	Second	Third
421	1	1 December 1983	(Socialist Federal Republic of Yugoslavia) Kranjska Gora	SL _{144}	(Switzerland) Erika Hess	(United States) Tamara McKinney	(Poland) Małgorzata Tlałka
422	2	7 December 1983	(France) Val d'Isère	DH _{116}	(West Germany) Irene Epple	(Switzerland) Ariane Ehrat	(France) Caroline Attia
423	3	8 December 1983	(France) Val d'Isère	DH _{117}	(Switzerland) Maria Walliser	(West Germany) Irene Epple	(Austria) Lea Sölkner
424	4	11 December 1983	(France) Val d'Isère	GS _{130}	(Switzerland) Erika Hess	(France) Perrine Pelen	(Liechtenstein) Hanni Wenzel
425	5	11 December 1983	(France) Val d'Isère	KB _{031}	(West Germany) Irene Epple	(Switzerland) Erika Hess	(Liechtenstein) Hanni Wenzel
426	6	14 December 1983	(Italy) Sestriere	SL _{145}	(Italy) Maria Rosa Quario	(Austria) Roswitha Steiner	(Switzerland) Monika Hess
427	7	8 December 1983; 14 December 1983	(France) Val d'Isère (DH2) (Italy) Sestriere (SL)	KB _{032}	(Switzerland) Erika Hess	(Austria) Lea Sölkner	(United States) Christin Cooper
428	8	17 December 1983	(Italy) Piancavallo	SL _{146}	(Austria) Roswitha Steiner	(Poland) Małgorzata Tlałka	(Italy) Maria Rosa Quario
429	9	21 December 1983	(Austria) Haus im Ennstal	DH _{118}	(Liechtenstein) Hanni Wenzel	(West Germany) Irene Epple	(Switzerland) Maria Walliser
430	10	22 December 1983	(Austria) Haus im Ennstal	GS _{131}	(Liechtenstein) Hanni Wenzel	(West Germany) Maria Epple	(United States) Christin Cooper
431	11	7 January 1984	(France) Puy St. Vincent	DH _{119}	(Canada) Gerry Sorensen	(Austria) Veronika Vitzthum	(Switzerland) Maria Walliser
432	12	8 January 1984	(France) Puy St. Vincent	SG _{003}	(Canada) Laurie Graham	(Switzerland) Michela Figini	(United States) Debbie Armstrong
433	13	8 January 1984	(France) Puy St. Vincent	KB _{033}	(Canada) Gerry Sorensen	(West Germany) Irene Epple	(West Germany) Marina Kiehl
434	14	13 January 1984	(Austria) Bad Gastein	DH _{120}	(Liechtenstein) Hanni Wenzel	(West Germany) Irene Epple	(Switzerland) Maria Walliser
435	15	14 January 1984	(Austria) Bad Gastein	SL _{147}	(France) Perrine Pelen	(Austria) Roswitha Steiner	(Poland) Dorota Tlałka
436	16	14 January 1984	(Austria) Bad Gastein	KB _{034}	(Liechtenstein) Hanni Wenzel	(Czechoslovakia) Olga Charvátová	(United States) Tamara McKinney
437	17	15 January 1984	(Socialist Federal Republic of Yugoslavia) Maribor	SL _{148}	(Switzerland) Erika Hess	(United States) Tamara McKinney	(United States) Christin Cooper
438	18	21 January 1984	(Switzerland) Verbier	DH _{121}	(Switzerland) Maria Walliser	(United States) Holly Flanders	(Czechoslovakia) Olga Charvátová
439	19	22 January 1984	(Switzerland) Verbier	SL _{149}	(Austria) Anni Kronbichler	(West Germany) Maria Epple	(Switzerland) Erika Hess
440	20	22 January 1984	(Switzerland) Verbier	KB _{035}	(Switzerland) Erika Hess	(Czechoslovakia) Olga Charvátová	(Switzerland) Brigitte Örtli
441	21	23 January 1984	(Italy) Limone Piemonte	SL _{150}	(Italy) Daniela Zini	(Italy) Maria Rosa Quario	(United States) Christin Cooper
442	22	28 January 1984	(France) Megève	DH _{122}	(Switzerland) Michela Figini	(Austria) Elisabeth Kirchler	(Austria) Sylvia Eder
443	23	29 January 1984	(France) St. Gervais	GS _{132}	(Switzerland) Erika Hess	(United States) Christin Cooper	(France) Carole Merle
444	24	28 January 1984; 29 January 1984	(France) Megève (DH) (France) St. Gervais (GS)	KB _{036}	(Switzerland) Michela Figini	(Austria) Elisabeth Kirchler	(Canada) Liisa Savijarvi
1984 Winter Olympics (13–19 February)
445	25	3 March 1984	(Canada) Mont St. Anne	DH _{123}	(United States) Holly Flanders	(France) Marie-Luce Waldmeier	(Austria) Sylvia Eder
446	26	4 March 1984	(Canada) Mont St. Anne	SG _{004}	(West Germany) Marina Kiehl	(Austria) Elisabeth Kirchler	(United States) Christin Cooper
447	27	7 March 1984	(United States) Lake Placid	GS _{133}	(United States) Christin Cooper	(West Germany) Marina Kiehl	(West Germany) Maria Epple
448	28	10 March 1984	(United States) Waterville Valley	SL _{151}	(United States) Tamara McKinney	(Switzerland) Brigitte Gadient	(France) Perrine Pelen
449	29	11 March 1984	(United States) Waterville Valley	GS _{134}	(United States) Tamara McKinney	(Switzerland) Erika Hess	(United States) Christin Cooper
450	30	17 March 1984	(Czechoslovakia) Jasná	GS _{135}	(Switzerland) Erika Hess	(Switzerland) Michela Figini	(United States) Christin Cooper
451	31	18 March 1984	(Czechoslovakia) Jasná	SL _{152}	(Austria) Roswitha Steiner	(France) Perrine Pelen	(Italy) Paoletta Magoni
452	32	20 March 1984	(West Germany) Zwiesel	SL _{153}	(Liechtenstein) Hanni Wenzel	(United States) Tamara McKinney	(France) Perrine Pelen
453	33	21 March 1984	(West Germany) Zwiesel	GS _{136}	(United States) Tamara McKinney	(Switzerland) Erika Hess	(Spain) Blanca Fernández Ochoa
454	34	24 March 1984	(Norway) Oslo	SL _{154}	(United States) Tamara McKinney	(Poland) Dorota Tlałka	(France) Perrine Pelen
Nations Cup		25 March 1984	(Norway) Oslo	PS _{ncr}	(Czechoslovakia) Olga Charvátová	(Switzerland) Erika Hess	(United States) Tamara McKinney

== Men ==
=== Overall ===
see complete table

In men's overall World Cup 1983/84 the best five downhills, best five giant slaloms/Super-G, best five slaloms and best three combined count. The parallel slalom only counts for the Nationscup (or was a show-event). 29 racers had a point deduction.

Place	Name	Country	Total	DH	GS SG	SL	KB
1	Pirmin Zurbriggen	Switzerland	256	59	115	17	65
2	Ingemar Stenmark	Sweden	230	-	115	115	-
3	Marc Girardelli	Luxembourg	222	-	92	125	5
4	Andreas Wenzel	Liechtenstein	191	3	58	60	70
5	Anton Steiner	Austria	148	67	4	23	54
6	Franz Heinzer	Switzerland	129	66	26	-	37
7	Urs Räber	Switzerland	118	94	-	-	24
8	Franz Gruber	Austria	113	-	19	82	12
9	Alex Giorgi	Italy	107	-	49	43	15
10	Bojan Križaj	Yugoslavia	105	-	34	66	6
11	Hans Enn	Austria	105	-	105	-	-
12	Erwin Resch	Austria	91	91	-	-	-
	Max Julen	Switzerland	91	-	60	31	-
14	Bill Johnson	United States	87	87	-	-	-
15	Phil Mahre	United States	85	2	24	44	15
	Helmut Höflehner	Austria	85	74	-	-	11
17	Thomas Bürgler	Switzerland	84	-	54	2	28
18	Petar Popangelov	Bulgaria	82	-	-	77	5
19	Jure Franko	Yugoslavia	80	-	68	5	7
20	Franz Klammer	Austria	79	79	-	-	-

=== Downhill ===
see complete table

In men's downhill World Cup 1983/84 the best 5 results count. 12 racers had a point deduction, which are given in ().

Place	Name	Country	Total	2	3	8	12	14	18	22	25	28	32
1	Urs Räber	Switzerland	94	12	12	25	25	(1)	(10)	-	20	(6)	-
2	Erwin Resch	Austria	91	25	(10)	-	(10)	15	20	20	-	11	-
3	Bill Johnson	United States	87	-	-	-	-	25	-	-	12	25	25
4	Franz Klammer	Austria	79	11	(6)	8	20	(3)	25	15	(2)	-	(6)
5	Steve Podborski	Canada	76	15	(9)	15	-	-	-	25	10	(8)	11
6	Helmut Höflehner	Austria	74	-	-	-	2	-	-	7	25	20	20
7	Anton Steiner	Austria	67	-	-	-	-	20	15	6	6	20	(5)
8	Franz Heinzer	Switzerland	66	(4)	25	12	11	-	-	(8)	(2)	9	9
9	Todd Brooker	Canada	64	10	20	20	-	-	-	-	-	2	12
10	Pirmin Zurbriggen	Switzerland	59	-	-	-	-	10	12	10	-	12	15

=== Giant slalom / Super-G ===
see complete table

In men's giant slalom and super-G World Cup 1983/84 the best 5 results count. 14 racers had a point deduction, which are given in (). Ingemar Stenmark and Pirmin Zurbriggen finished tied on total points, but Stenmark's 4 race victories (compared to Zurbriggen's 3) gave him his seventh Giant slalom (and super-G) World Cup! This record is still unbeaten!

Place	Name	Country	Total	4SG	6	9SG	13	21	23SG	26	29	31	33	35SG	36
1	Ingemar Stenmark	Sweden	115	-	(9)	-	25	25	(11)	25	-	25	15	-	(11)
2	Pirmin Zurbriggen	Switzerland	115	20	20	25	(15)	-	(20)	-	25	(20)	(10)	25	(12)
3	Hans Enn	Austria	105	25	(12)	(12)	(10)	-	15	-	-	15	25	(12)	25
4	Marc Girardelli	Luxembourg	92	(4)	-	-	12	20	(12)	20	20	-	(12)	20	-
5	Jure Franko	Yugoslavia	68	15	15	(8)	11	12	(9)	-	-	-	-	15	(9)
6	Hubert Strolz	Austria	65	-	8	(6)	20	(4)	(5)	8	-	(2)	20	9	(1)
7	Max Julen	Switzerland	60	8	25	-	9	-	-	-	-	12	(4)	(1)	6
8	Andreas Wenzel	Liechtenstein	58	(3)	(5)	10	-	-	25	6	-	-	-	10	7
9	Thomas Bürgler	Switzerland	54	(6)	10	(7)	(4)	10	-	9	10	(6)	-	(6)	15
10	Guido Hinterseer	Austria	49	-	(6)	11	8	11	10	-	-	9	-	(7)	(5)
	Martin Hangl	Switzerland	49	-	7	20	-	-	(3)	(2)	12	-	5	5	-
	Alex Giorgi	Italy	49	-	-	-	-	7	-	-	9	(4)	8	5	20

=== Slalom ===
see complete table

In men's slalom World Cup 1983/84 the best 5 results count. Six racers had a point deduction, which are given in (). Marc Girardelli won the cup with maximum points.

Place	Name	Country	Total	1	7	10	15	16	19	27	30	34	37
1	Marc Girardelli	Luxembourg	125	-	-	-	25	(20)	25	25	-	25	25
2	Ingemar Stenmark	Sweden	115	-	25	25	-	25	(11)	20	(6)	(12)	20
3	Franz Gruber	Austria	82	(11)	(11)	(8)	12	15	20	15	-	20	-
4	Petar Popangelov	Bulgaria	77	20	-	15	-	10	(6)	(5)	20	(6)	12
5	Bojan Križaj	Yugoslavia	66	-	20	10	9	12	15	(7)	-	(8)	(8)
6	Andreas Wenzel	Liechtenstein	60	25	-	7	15	5	-	8	-	-	-
7	Paolo De Chiesa	Italy	57	-	-	-	20	-	-	12	-	10	15
8	Robert Zoller	Austria	55	-	-	20	-	-	-	-	25	-	10
9	Phil Mahre	United States	44	7	-	-	-	-	12	10	15	-	-
	Lars-Göran Halvarsson	Sweden	44	-	-	-	-	11	-	3	15	15	-

=== Combined ===
see complete table

In men's combined World Cup 1983/84 all 5 results count.

Place	Name	Country	Total	5	11	17	20	24
1	Andreas Wenzel	Liechtenstein	90	10	25	25	10	20
2	Pirmin Zurbriggen	Switzerland	65	20	-	-	20	25
3	Anton Steiner	Austria	54	-	9	20	25	-
4	Franz Heinzer	Switzerland	37	25	-	-	-	12
5	Thomas Bürgler	Switzerland	28	-	20	-	-	8
6	Urs Räber	Switzerland	24	9	-	-	11	4
7	Guido Hinterseer	Austria	21	-	-	-	12	9
8	Silvano Meli	Switzerland	20	-	-	11	9	-
9	Bruno Kernen	Switzerland	19	12	-	-	7	-
10	Peter Šoltys	Czechoslovakia	16	-	-	10	6	-

== Women ==
=== Overall ===
see complete table

In women's overall World Cup 1983/84 the best four downhills, best four giant slaloms/Super-G, best four slaloms and best three combined count. The parallel slalom only counts for the Nationscup (or was a show-event). 30 racers had a point deduction.

Place	Name	Country	Total	DH	GS SG	SL	KB
1	Erika Hess	Switzerland	247	5	95	77	70
2	Hanni Wenzel	Liechtenstein	238	70	60	57	51
3	Tamara McKinney	United States	195	0	74	90	31
4	Irene Epple	West Germany	178	85	33	3	57
5	Michela Figini	Switzerland	166	60	57	0	49
6	Christin Cooper	United States	161	10	75	50	26
7	Olga Charvátová	Czechoslovakia	153	34	32	35	52
8	Maria Walliser	Switzerland	131	80	22	0	29
9	Marina Kiehl	West Germany	126	29	67	0	30
10	Perrine Pelen	France	122	0	47	75	0
	Elisabeth Kirchler	Austria	122	38	48	0	36
12	Gerry Sorensen	Canada	100	60	15	0	25
13	Lea Sölkner	Austria	95	46	0	9	40
14	Maria Epple	West Germany	92	0	53	39	0
15	Roswitha Steiner	Austria	91	0	1	90	0
16	Brigitte Örtli	Switzerland	89	23	11	32	23
17	Maria Rosa Quario	Italy	69	0	0	69	0
18	Sylvia Eder	Austria	67	51	2	5	9
19	Laurie Graham	Canada	65	23	32	0	10
20	Holly Flanders	United States	60	60	0	0	0

=== Downhill ===
see complete table

In women's downhill World Cup 1983/84 the best 5 results count. Four racers had a point deduction, which are given in ().

Place	Name	Country	Total	2	3	9	11	14	18	22	25
1	Maria Walliser	Switzerland	95	(8)	25	15	15	15	25	(12)	(3)
2	Irene Epple	West Germany	94	25	20	20	9	20	-	-	-
3	Hanni Wenzel	Liechtenstein	77	10	7	25	10	25	-	-	-
4	Gerry Sorensen	Canada	70	-	12	(1)	25	10	-	11	12
5	Michela Figini	Switzerland	67	7	-	11	(7)	12	12	25	-
6	Holly Flanders	United States	64	-	-	7	-	8	20	4	25
7	Sylvia Eder	Austria	52	9	1	-	12	-	-	15	15
8	Ariane Ehrat	Switzerland	49	20	11	4	-	9	-	-	5
9	Lea Sölkner	Austria	46	12	15	-	8	11	-	-	-
10	Jana Gantnerová-Šoltýsová	Czechoslovakia	44	11	9	9	6	-	(1)	9	-

=== Giant slalom / Super-G ===
see complete table

In women's giant slalom and super-G World Cup 1983/84 the best 5 results count. Nine racers had a point deduction, which are given in (). Erika Hess won the cup with all points collected in giant slaloms.

Place	Name	Country	Total	4	10	12SG	23	26SG	27	29	30	33
1	Erika Hess	Switzerland	115	25	(12)	-	25	-	(10)	20	25	20
2	Christin Cooper	United States	90	-	15	(2)	20	15	25	15	(15)	-
3	Tamara McKinney	United States	85	12	(10)	-	(7)	(10)	12	25	11	25
4	Marina Kiehl	West Germany	77	(6)	-	10	-	25	20	-	10	12
5	Hanni Wenzel	Liechtenstein	69	15	25	9	-	9	11	-	(4)	(8)
6	Michela Figini	Switzerland	64	8	7	20	(2)	-	-	-	20	9
7	Elisabeth Kirchler	Austria	55	7	(5)	-	9	20	(4)	12	-	7
8	Maria Epple	West Germany	53	-	20	-	-	-	15	6	12	-
9	Perrine Pelen	France	51	20	9	-	10	-	4	8	(1)	-
10	Carole Merle	France	37	11	-	-	15	-	-	11	-	-
11	Olga Charvátová	Czechoslovakia	34	9	8	8	-	-	2	-	7	(1)
12	Irene Epple	West Germany	33	10	11	12	-	-	-	-	-	-
	Debbie Armstrong	United States	33	-	-	15	11	-	-	-	-	7
14	Laurie Graham	Canada	32	-	-	25	-	7	-	-	-	-

=== Slalom ===
see complete table

In women's slalom World Cup 1983/84 the best 5 results count. 13 racers had a point deduction, which are given in ().

Place	Name	Country	Total	1	6	8	15	17	19	21	28	31	32	34
1	Tamara McKinney	United States	110	20	-	(10)	(12)	20	(7)	-	25	-	20	25
2	Roswitha Steiner	Austria	100	-	20	25	20	-	-	-	-	25	-	10
3	Perrine Pelen	France	90	-	-	(11)	25	-	-	-	15	20	15	15
4	Erika Hess	Switzerland	89	25	(11)	12	(8)	25	15	12	(11)	-	(10)	(12)
5	Maria Rosa Quario	Italy	77	-	25	15	-	-	-	20	-	-	9	8
6	Dorota Tlałka	Poland	71	(7)	12	(9)	15	(11)	12	-	(10)	12	(11)	20
7	Hanni Wenzel	Liechtenstein	65	-	-	-	(7)	12	9	-	8	11	25	-
8	Małgorzata Tlałka	Poland	64	15	10	20	-	-	-	(5)	-	-	8	11
9	Christin Cooper	United States	60	10	(9)	-	10	15	-	15	10	-	-	-
10	Anni Kronbichler	Austria	56	(5)	-	(1)	11	7	25	(3)	-	-	6	7
11	Daniela Zini	Italy	49	-	-	5	9	10	-	25	-	-	-	-

=== Combined ===
see complete table

In women's combined World Cup 1983/84 the best 5 results count. One racer had a point deduction, which is given in ().

Place	Name	Country	Total	5	7	13	16	20	24
1	Erika Hess	Switzerland	79	20	25	-	9	25	-
2	Irene Epple	West Germany	77	25	10	20	10	12	-
3	Olga Charvátová	Czechoslovakia	70	(6)	12	7	20	20	11
4	Hanni Wenzel	Liechtenstein	69	15	-	11	25	11	7
5	Michela Figini	Switzerland	67	12	-	12	8	10	25
6	Lea Sölkner	Austria	44	-	20	4	12	8	-
	Elisabeth Kirchler	Austria	44	10	-	3	5	6	20
8	Maria Walliser	Switzerland	43	9	7	8	7	-	12
9	Tamara McKinney	United States	31	7	-	-	15	9	-
	Marina Kiehl	West Germany	31	11	4	15	-	1	-
11	Christin Cooper	United States	26	-	15	-	11	-	-
12	Gerry Sorensen	Canada	25	-	-	25	-	-	-

== Nations Cup ==
=== Overall ===
Place	Country	Total	Men	Women
1	Switzerland	2313	1224	1089
2	Austria	1899	1306	593
3	United States	922	237	685
4	West Germany	656	118	538
5	Liechtenstein	588	256	332
6	Italy	517	348	169
7	France	495	78	417
8	Sweden	484	482	2
9	Canada	436	183	253
10	Yugoslavia	416	335	81
11	Czechoslovakia	328	28	300
12	Luxembourg	271	271	0
13	Poland	207	0	207
14	Bulgaria	101	101	0
15	Soviet Union	34	31	3
16	Spain	33	0	33
17	Australia	29	29	0
18	Japan	20	20	0
19	Mexico	9	9	0
20	Norway	8	8	0
21	Hungary	5	5	0
22	United Kingdom	2	2	0

=== Men ===
All points were shown including individual deduction. But without parallel slalom, because result ? (Also possible, that the parallel slalom was only a show-event.)

Place	Country	Total	DH	GS SG	SL	KB	Racers	Wins
1	Austria	1306	526	398	248	134	20	8
2	Switzerland	1224	425	479	80	240	14	9
3	Sweden	482	0	174	308	0	10	7
4	Italy	348	67	111	130	40	14	0
5	Yugoslavia	335	0	198	116	21	6	0
6	Luxembourg	271	0	121	145	5	1	5
7	Liechtenstein	256	3	71	92	90	2	4
8	United States	237	97	44	79	17	8	3
9	Canada	183	181	0	0	2	5	1
10	West Germany	118	40	41	14	23	9	0
11	Bulgaria	101	0	0	94	7	2	0
12	France	78	5	12	46	15	8	0
13	Soviet Union	31	15	0	16	0	3	0
14	Australia	29	29	0	0	0	1	0
15	Czechoslovakia	28	0	0	0	28	2	0
16	Japan	20	0	0	12	8	3	0
17	Mexico	9	0	0	0	9	1	0
18	Norway	8	0	3	5	0	1	0
19	Hungary	5	0	0	0	5	1	0
20	United Kingdom	2	2	0	0	0	1	0

=== Women ===
All points were shown including individual deduction. But without parallel slalom, because result ? (Also possible, that the parallel slalom was only a show-event.)

Place	Country	Total	DH	GS SG	SL	KB	Racers	Wins
1	Switzerland	1089	278	298	296	217	12	11
2	United States	685	107	287	209	82	12	6
3	Austria	593	212	75	183	123	14	3
4	West Germany	538	151	182	46	159	7	3
5	France	417	87	167	132	31	13	1
6	Liechtenstein	332	77	81	105	69	3	5
7	Czechoslovakia	300	81	37	90	92	5	0
8	Canada	253	116	80	5	52	6	3
9	Poland	207	0	0	207	0	3	0
10	Italy	169	0	6	163	0	4	2
11	Yugoslavia	81	0	10	71	0	5	0
12	Spain	33	0	22	11	0	1	0
13	Soviet Union	3	0	0	1	2	2	0
14	Sweden	2	0	0	2	0	1	0
