= 1985 Alpine Skiing World Cup – Women's downhill =

1985 Women's downhill World Cup
Previous: 1984	Next: 1986

Women's downhill World Cup 1984/1985

== Final point standings ==
In women's downhill World Cup 1984/85 the best 5 results count. Deductions are given in ().

Place	Name	Country	Total points	Deduction	2 (France)	9 (Italy)	12 (Austria)	14 (Austria)	19 (France)	23 (United States)	25 (Canada)	27 (Canada)
1	Michela Figini	Switzerland	115	(17)	(5)	(12)	25	25	25	-	20	20
2	Maria Walliser	Switzerland	81	(19)	(8)	-	11	15	(11)	15	25	15
3	Brigitte Oertli	Switzerland	76		-	-	20	20	-	20	7	9
4	Laurie Graham	Canada	73	(6)	-	(6)	10	11	-	12	15	25
5	Elisabeth Kirchler	Austria	71	(9)	12	25	12	12	-	(9)	10	-
6	Katrin Gutensohn	Austria	63	(2)	4	15	(2)	8	-	25	11	-
7	Marina Kiehl	West Germany	48		20	10	9	-	-	-	2	7
8	Ariane Ehrat	Switzerland	45	(4)	11	5	15	6	-	-	8	(4)
9	Zoe Haas	Switzerland	42		25	5	1	-	-	-	-	11
10	Catherine Quittet	France	33		-	8	-	-	20	-	5	-
11	Karen Stemmle	Canada	30		-	-	-	7	-	11	-	12
	Olga Charvátová	Czechoslovakia	30		-	-	6	2	-	8	9	5
13	Veronika Vitzthum	Austria	29		9	20	-	-	-	-	-	-
	Sylvia Eder	Austria	29		7	-	-	5	12	5	-	-
	Holly Flanders	United States	29		-	-	-	-	9	10	4	6
	Liisa Savijarvi	Canada	29		-	-	4	10	-	-	12	3
17	Sieglinde Winkler	Austria	28		-	11	8	9	-	-	-	-
18	Claudine Emonet	France	27		-	-	-	-	15	-	2	10
19	Sigrid Wolf	Austria	24		-	9	3	3	7	-	-	2
20	Regine Mösenlechner	West Germany	21		3	3	5	4	6	-	-	-
21	Michaela Gerg	West Germany	18		10	-	-	1	-	7	-	-
22	Caroline Attia	France	17		-	-	-	-	5	6	6	-
23	Debbie Armstrong	United States	16		-	-	-	-	4	4	-	8
24	Irene Epple	West Germany	15		15	-	-	-	-	-	-	-
25	Élisabeth Chaud	France	10		-	-	-	-	10	-	-	-
	Karla Delago	Italy	10		-	-	7	-	3	-	-	-
27	Jana Gantnerová-Šoltýsová	Czechoslovakia	8		-	-	-	-	8	-	-	-
	Marie-Cécile Gros-Gaudenier	France	8		2	2	-	-	1	3	-	-
29	Diane Haight	Canada	7		7	-	-	-	-	-	-	-
	Veronika Wallinger	Austria	7		-	7	-	-	-	-	-	-
31	Cindy Oak	United States	5		-	-	-	-	-	2	3	-
32	Patricia Kästle	Switzerland	2		-	-	-	-	2	-	-	-
	Heidi Wiesler	West Germany	2		-	-	-	-	-	-	-	2
34	Cindy Nelson	United States	1		1	-	-	-	-	-	-	-
	Michaela Marzola	Italy	1		-	1	-	-	-	-	-	-
	Christine Putz	Austria	1		-	-	-	-	-	1	-	-

Alpine skiing World Cup
Women

Overall | Downhill | Giant/Super G | Slalom | Combined

1985
