= 1984 Alpine Skiing World Cup – Women's combined =

1984 Women's combined World Cup
Previous: 1983	Next: 1985

Women's combined World Cup 1983/1984

== Calendar ==
Round	Race No	Discipline	Place	Country	Date	Winner	Second	Third
1	5	Downhill; Giant	Val d'Isère	France	December 8, 1983; December 11, 1983	(West Germany) Irene Epple	(Switzerland) Erika Hess	(Liechtenstein) Hanni Wenzel
2	7	Downhill slalom	Val d'Isère; Sestriere	France; Italy	December 11, 1983; December 14, 1983	(Switzerland) Erika Hess	(Austria) Lea Sölkner	(United States) Christin Cooper
3	13	Downhill; Super-G	Puy St. Vincent	France	January 7, 1984; January 8, 1984	(Canada) Gerry Sorensen	(West Germany) Irene Epple	(West Germany) Marina Kiehl
4	16	Downhill slalom	Badgastein	Austria	January 13, 1984; January 14, 1984	(Liechtenstein) Hanni Wenzel	(Czechoslovakia) Olga Charvátová	(United States) Tamara McKinney
5	20	Downhill slalom	Verbier	France	January 21, 1984; January 22, 1984	(Switzerland) Erika Hess	(Czechoslovakia) Olga Charvátová	(Switzerland) Brigitte Oertli
6	24	Downhill; Giant	Megève; St. Gervais	France; France	January 28, 1984; January 29, 1984	(Switzerland) Michela Figini	(Austria) Elisabeth Kirchler	(Canada) Liisa Savijarvi

== Final point standings ==
In women's combined World Cup 1983/84 the best 5 results count. Deductions are given in ().

Place	Name	Country	Total points	Deduction	5 (France)	7 (France) (Italy)	13 (France)	16 (Austria)	20 (Switzerland)	24 (France)
1	Erika Hess	Switzerland	79		20	25	-	9	25	-
2	Irene Epple	West Germany	77		25	10	20	10	12	-
3	Olga Charvátová	Czechoslovakia	70	(6)	(6)	12	7	20	20	11
4	Hanni Wenzel	Liechtenstein	69		15	-	11	25	11	7
5	Michela Figini	Switzerland	67		12	-	12	8	10	25
6	Lea Sölkner	Austria	44		-	20	4	12	8	-
	Elisabeth Kirchler	Austria	44		10	-	3	5	6	20
8	Maria Walliser	Switzerland	43		9	7	8	7	-	12
9	Tamara McKinney	United States	31		7	-	-	15	9	-
	Marina Kiehl	West Germany	31		11	4	15	-	1	-
11	Christin Cooper	United States	26		-	15	-	11	-	-
12	Gerry Sorensen	Canada	25		-	-	25	-	-	-
13	Brigitte Oertli	Switzerland	24		2	-	-	6	15	1
14	Michaela Gerg	West Germany	23		5	11	-	-	7	-
15	Debbie Armstrong	United States	19		4	-	5	-	-	10
16	Regine Mösenlechner	West Germany	18		1	-	-	4	5	8
17	Liisa Savijarvi	Canada	15		-	-	-	-	-	15
18	Ivana Valešová	Czechoslovakia	11		-	6	-	3	2	-
19	Laurie Graham	Canada	10		-	-	10	-	-	-
20	Veronika Wallinger	Austria	9		-	9	-	-	-	-
	Veronika Vitzthum	Austria	9		-	-	9	-	-	-
	Hélène Barbier	France	9		-	-	-	-	-	9
	Sylvia Eder	Austria	9		-	-	6	-	-	3
24	Carole Merle	France	8		8	-	-	-	-	-
	Katrin Gutensohn	Austria	8		-	8	-	-	-	-
26	Sonja Stotz	West Germany	7		-	-	-	-	3	4
27	Catherine Quittet	France	6		-	-	-	-	-	6
28	Jana Gantnerová	Czechoslovakia	5		-	5	-	-	-	-
	Françoise Bozon	France	5		-	-	-	-	-	5
30	Eva Twardokens	United States	4		-	-	-	-	4	-
31	Heidi Wiesler	West Germany	3		3	-	-	-	-	-
	Veronique Robin	Switzerland	3		-	3	-	-	-	-
33	Olga Loginowa	Soviet Union	2		-	2	-	-	-	-
	Élisabeth Chaud	France	2		-	-	2	-	-	-
	Pam Fletcher	United States	2		-	-	-	2	-	-
	Diane Haight	Canada	2		-	-	-	-	-	2
37	Claudine Emonet	France	1		-	-	1	-	-	-
	Patricia Kästle	Switzerland	1		-	-	-	1	-	-

Alpine skiing World Cup
Women

Overall | Downhill | Giant/Super G | Slalom | Combined

1984
