= 1984 Alpine Skiing World Cup – Women's downhill =

1984 Women's downhill World Cup
Previous: 1983	Next: 1985

Women's downhill World Cup 1983/1984

== Calendar ==
Round	Race No	Place	Country	Date	Winner	Second	Third
1	2	Val d'Isère	France	December 7, 1983	(West Germany) Irene Epple	(Switzerland) Ariane Ehrat	(France) Caroline Attia
2	3	Val d'Isère	France	December 8, 1983	(Switzerland) Maria Walliser	(West Germany) Irene Epple	(Austria) Lea Sölkner
3	9	Haus im Ennstal	Austria	December 21, 1983	(Liechtenstein) Hanni Wenzel	(West Germany) Irene Epple	(Switzerland) Maria Walliser
4	11	Puy St. Vincent	France	January 7, 1984	(Canada) Gerry Sorensen	(Austria) Veronika Vitzthum	(Switzerland) Maria Walliser
5	14	Badgastein	Austria	January 13, 1984	(Liechtenstein) Hanni Wenzel	(West Germany) Irene Epple	(Switzerland) Maria Walliser
6	18	Verbier	Switzerland	January 21, 1984	(Switzerland) Maria Walliser	(United States) Holly Flanders	(Czechoslovakia) Olga Charvátová
7	22	Megève	France	January 28, 1984	(Switzerland) Michela Figini	(Austria) Elisabeth Kirchler	(Austria) Sylvia Eder
8	25	Mont St. Anne, Quebec	Canada	March 3, 1984	(United States) Holly Flanders	(France) Marie-Luce Waldmeier	(Austria) Sylvia Eder

== Final point standings ==
In women's downhill World Cup 1983/84 the best 5 results count. Deductions are given in ().

Place	Name	Country	Total points	Deduction	2 (France)	3 (France)	9 (Austria)	11 (France)	14 (Austria)	18 (Switzerland)	22 (France)	25 (Canada)
1	Maria Walliser	Switzerland	95	(23)	(8)	25	15	15	15	25	(12)	(3)
2	Irene Epple	West Germany	94		25	20	20	9	20	-	-	-
3	Hanni Wenzel	Liechtenstein	77		10	7	25	10	25	-	-	-
4	Gerry Sorensen	Canada	70	(1)	-	12	(1)	25	10	-	11	12
5	Michela Figini	Switzerland	67	(7)	7	-	11	(7)	12	12	25	-
6	Holly Flanders	United States	64		-	-	7	-	8	20	4	25
7	Sylvia Eder	Austria	52		9	1	-	12	-	-	15	15
8	Ariane Ehrat	Switzerland	49		20	11	4	-	9	-	-	5
9	Lea Sölkner	Austria	46		12	15	-	8	11	-	-	-
10	Jana Gantnerová	Czechoslovakia	44	(1)	11	9	9	6	-	(1)	9	-
11	Elisabeth Kirchler	Austria	40		-	2	6	5	7	-	20	-
12	Olga Charvátová	Czechoslovakia	36		-	-	8	2	6	15	5	-
13	Marie-Luce Waldmeier	France	32		-	-	12	-	-	-	-	20
14	Marina Kiehl	West Germany	29		5	8	-	11	-	5	-	-
15	Veronika Vitzthum	Austria	26		-	6	-	20	-	-	-	-
16	Brigitte Oertli	Switzerland	23		-	-	10	-	2	-	-	11
	Laurie Graham	Canada	23		-	-	-	3	4	-	7	9
18	Karen Stemmle	Canada	21		-	3	-	-	-	12	3	3
19	Regine Mösenlechner	West Germany	16		-	-	3	-	-	7	-	6
20	Caroline Attia	France	15		15	-	-	-	-	-	-	-
	Élisabeth Chaud	France	15		2	-	-	-	5	6	2	-
22	Cindy Oak	United States	14		-	-	-	-	-	-	10	4
23	Katrin Gutensohn	Austria	10		-	10	-	-	-	-	-	-
	Sieglinde Winkler	Austria	10		6	4	-	-	-	-	-	-
	Heidi Wiesler	West Germany	10		-	-	6	4	-	-	-	-
	Christin Cooper	United States	10		-	-	-	-	-	10	-	-
	Christine Zangerl	Austria	10		-	-	-	-	-	-	-	10
28	Patricia Kästle	Switzerland	9		-	-	-	-	-	9	-	-
	Marie-Cécile Gros-Gaudenier	France	9		-	-	-	-	-	-	9	-
30	Françoise Bozon	France	8		-	-	-	-	-	8	-	-
	Maria Maricich	United States	8		-	-	-	1	-	-	7	-
	Lisa Wilcox	United States	8		-	-	-	-	-	-	-	8
	Sigrid Wolf	Austria	8		-	-	-	-	1	-	-	7
34	Veronika Wallinger	Austria	7		1	-	2	-	-	4	-	-
35	Erika Hess	Switzerland	5		-	5	-	-	-	-	-	-
	Claudine Emonet	France	5		4	1	-	-	-	-	-	-
37	Catherine Quittet	France	3		3	-	-	-	-	-	-	-
	Debbie Armstrong	United States	3		-	-	-	-	3	-	-	-
	Huberta Wolf	Austria	3		-	-	-	-	-	3	-	-
40	Michaela Gerg	West Germany	2		-	-	-	-	-	2	-	-
41	Liisa Savijarvi	Canada	1		-	-	-	-	-	-	1	-
	Diane Haight	Canada	1		-	-	-	-	-	-	-	1

Alpine skiing World Cup
Women

Overall | Downhill | Giant/Super G | Slalom | Combined

1984
