= 1985 Alpine Skiing World Cup – Women's slalom =

1985 Women's slalom World Cup
Previous: 1984	Next: 1986

Women's slalom World Cup 1984/1985

== Calendar ==
Round	Race No	Place	Country	Date	Winner	Second	Third
1	1	Courmayeur	Italy	December 1, 1984	(France) Perrine Pelen	(West Germany) Maria Epple	(Italy) Paoletta Magoni
2	4	Davos	Switzerland	December 9, 1984	(France) Christelle Guignard	(Switzerland) Erika Hess	(France) Hélène Barbier
3	6	Madonna di Campiglio	Italy	December 14, 1984	(Poland) Dorota Tlałka	(Switzerland) Brigitte Gadient	(France) Christelle Guignard
4	11	Maribor	Yugoslavia	January 5, 1985	(United States) Tamara McKinney	(Czechoslovakia) Olga Charvátová	(Switzerland) Brigitte Gadient
5	15	Bad Kleinkirchheim	Austria	January 11, 1985	(France) Christelle Guignard	(Italy) Maria Rosa Quario	(Switzerland) Erika Hess
6	18	Pfronten	West Germany	January 14, 1985	(Italy) Paoletta Magoni	(Switzerland) Brigitte Oertli	(Italy) Daniela Zini
7	21	Arosa	Switzerland	January 25, 1985	(West Germany) Maria Epple	(United States) Tamara McKinney	(Switzerland) Erika Hess
8	30	Waterville Valley	United States	March 16, 1985	(United States) Tamara McKinney	(Italy) Maria Rosa Quario	(Austria) Anni Kronbichler
9	32	Park City	United States	March 19, 1985	(Switzerland) Erika Hess	(France) Perrine Pelen	(Italy) Maria Rosa Quario
10	33	Heavenly Valley	United States	March 22, 1985	(Switzerland) Erika Hess	(France) Perrine Pelen	(Poland) Małgorzata Tlałka

== Final point standings ==
In women's slalom World Cup 1984/85 the best 5 results count. Nine racers had a point deduction, which are given in (). Erika Hess won her fourth Slalom World Cup.

Place	Name	Country	Total points	Deduction	1 (Italy)	4 (Switzerland)	6 (Italy)	11 (Socialist Federal Republic of Yugoslavia)	15 (Austria)	18 (Germany)	21 (Switzerland)	30 (United States)	32 (United States)	33 (United States)
1	Erika Hess	Switzerland	100	(28)	(11)	20	-	(12)	15	-	15	(5)	25	25
2	Tamara McKinney	United States	93		12	-	-	25	-	-	20	25	-	11
3	Perrine Pelen	France	89	(27)	25	(5)	12	(11)	-	-	12	(11)	20	20
4	Maria Rosa Quario	Italy	75		10	-	-	-	20	-	10	20	15	-
5	Maria Epple	West Germany	67		20	4	9	-	-	-	25	-	9	-
	Brigitte Gadient	Switzerland	67	(6)	(5)	(1)	20	15	12	-	-	8	-	12
7	Christelle Guignard	France	65		-	25	15	-	25	-	-	-	-	-
8	Paoletta Magoni	Italy	64	(9)	15	-	-	9	(5)	25	6	(4)	-	9
9	Olga Charvátová	Czechoslovakia	60	(7)	-	10	11	20	7	12	(5)	(2)	-	-
10	Brigitte Oertli	Switzerland	58	(12)	-	11	(6)	-	(6)	20	7	12	-	8
11	Małgorzata Tlałka	Poland	49	(5)	6	12	4	(3)	(2)	-	-	-	12	15
12	Corinne Schmidhauser	Switzerland	46		-	9	5	-	12	10	-	-	10	-
13	Daniela Zini	Italy	41	(1)	8	-	(1)	2	9	15	-	7	-	-
14	Dorota Tlałka	Poland	40		-	8	25	7	-	-	-	-	-	-
15	Anni Kronbichler	Austria	34		9	-	-	-	-	-	-	15	-	10
16	Blanca Fernández Ochoa	Spain	33		1	-	-	8	4	9	11	-	-	-
17	Roswitha Steiner	Austria	32		-	7	10	5	1	-	-	9	-	-
18	Monika Äijä	Sweden	30		-	-	-	6	10	-	-	6	8	-
19	Eva Twardokens	United States	29		-	-	2	-	8	11	-	-	7	1
20	Anja Zavadlav	Yugoslavia	24	(3)	-	6	-	4	(3)	5	4	-	5	-
21	Hélène Barbier	France	23		-	15	-	-	-	8	-	-	-	-
22	Vreni Schneider	Switzerland	19		-	-	7	1	-	-	3	1	-	7
23	Ursula Konzett	Liechtenstein	18		-	-	8	10	-	-	-	-	-	-
24	Caroline Beer	Austria	13		3	-	-	-	-	4	-	-	-	6
25	Ida Ladstätter	Austria	11		-	-	-	-	-	-	-	-	11	-
	Traudl Hächer	West Germany	11		-	-	-	-	-	-	-	-	6	5
27	Camilla Nilsson	Sweden	10		-	-	-	-	-	-	-	10	-	-
28	Michela Figini	Switzerland	9		-	-	-	-	-	-	9	-	-	-
29	Ulrike Maier	Austria	8		-	-	-	-	-	-	8	-	-	-
30	Mateja Svet	Yugoslavia	7		7	-	-	-	-	-	-	-	-	-
	Elisabeth Kirchler	Austria	7		-	-	-	-	-	7	-	-	-	-
	Sylvia Eder	Austria	7		-	-	-	-	-	-	-	3	-	4
33	Elena Medzihradská	Czechoslovakia	6		-	-	-	-	-	6	-	-	-	-
34	Ivana Valešová	Czechoslovakia	4		4	-	-	-	-	-	-	-	-	-
	Amy Livran	United States	4		-	-	-	-	-	-	-	-	4	-
36	Christina Brichetti	Italy	3		-	3	-	-	-	-	-	-	-	-
	Andreja Leskovšek	Yugoslavia	3		-	-	3	-	-	-	-	-	-	-
	Renate Lazak	West Germany	3		-	-	-	-	-	3	-	-	-	-
	Heidi Bowes	United States	3		-	-	-	-	-	-	-	-	3	-
	Zoe Haas	Switzerland	3		-	-	-	-	-	-	-	-	-	3
41	Monika Maierhofer	Austria	2		2	-	-	-	-	-	-	-	-	-
	Regine Mösenlechner	West Germany	2		-	2	-	-	-	-	-	-	-	-
	Maria Walliser	Switzerland	2		-	-	-	-	-	2	-	-	-	-
	Karin Buder	Austria	2		-	-	-	-	-	-	2	-	-	-
	Heidi Dahlgren	United States	2		-	-	-	-	-	-	-	-	2	-
	Catarina Rosenqvist	Sweden	2		-	-	-	-	-	-	-	-	-	2
47	Diann Roffe	United States	1		-	-	-	-	-	1	-	-	-	-
	Sonja Stotz	West Germany	1		-	-	-	-	-	-	1	-	-	-

Alpine skiing World Cup
Women

Overall | Downhill | Giant/Super G | Slalom | Combined

1985
