= 1984 Alpine Skiing World Cup – Women's slalom =

1984 Women's slalom World Cup
| Previous: 1983 | Next: 1985 |

Women's slalom World Cup 1983/1984

== Calendar ==
| Round | Race No | Place | Country | Date | Winner | Second | Third |
|---|---|---|---|---|---|---|---|
| 1 | 1 | Kranjska Gora | Yugoslavia | December 1, 1983 | (Switzerland) Erika Hess | (United States) Tamara McKinney | (Poland) Małgorzata Tlałka |
| 2 | 6 | Sestriere | Italy | December 14, 1983 | (Italy) Maria Rosa Quario | (Austria) Roswitha Steiner | (Switzerland) Monika Hess |
| 3 | 8 | Piancavallo | Italy | December 17, 1983 | (Austria) Roswitha Steiner | (Poland) Małgorzata Tlałka | (Italy) Maria Rosa Quario |
| 4 | 15 | Badgastein | Austria | January 14, 1984 | (France) Perrine Pelen | (Austria) Roswitha Steiner | (Poland) Dorota Tlałka |
| 5 | 17 | Maribor | Yugoslavia | January 15, 1984 | (Switzerland) Erika Hess | (United States) Tamara McKinney | (United States) Christin Cooper |
| 6 | 19 | Verbier | Switzerland | January 22, 1984 | (Austria) Anni Kronbichler | (West Germany) Maria Epple | (Switzerland) Erika Hess |
| 7 | 21 | Limone Piemonte | Italy | January 23, 1984 | (Italy) Daniela Zini | (Italy) Maria Rosa Quario | (United States) Christin Cooper |
| 8 | 28 | Waterville Valley | United States | March 10, 1984 | (United States) Tamara McKinney | (Switzerland) Brigitte Gadient | (France) Perrine Pelen |
| 9 | 31 | Jasná | Czechoslovakia | March 18, 1984 | (Austria) Roswitha Steiner | (France) Perrine Pelen | (Italy) Paoletta Magoni |
| 10 | 32 | Zwiesel | West Germany | March 20, 1984 | (Liechtenstein) Hanni Wenzel | (United States) Tamara McKinney | (France) Perrine Pelen |
| 11 | 34 | Oslo | Norway | March 24, 1984 | (United States) Tamara McKinney | (Poland) Dorota Tlałka | (France) Perrine Pelen |

== Final point standings ==
In women's slalom World Cup 1983/84 the best 5 results count. Deductions are given in ().

| Place | Name | Country | Total points | Deduction | 1 (Socialist Federal Republic of Yugoslavia) | 6 (Italy) | 8 (Italy) | 15 (Austria) | 17 (Socialist Federal Republic of Yugoslavia) | 19 (Switzerland) | 21 (Italy) | 28 (United States) | 31 (Czechoslovakia) | 32 (Germany) | 34 (Norway) |
|---|---|---|---|---|---|---|---|---|---|---|---|---|---|---|---|
| 1 | Tamara McKinney | United States | 110 | (29) | 20 | - | (10) | (12) | 20 | (7) | - | 25 | - | 20 | 25 |
| 2 | Roswitha Steiner | Austria | 100 | | - | 20 | 25 | 20 | - | - | - | - | 25 | - | 10 |
| 3 | Perrine Pelen | France | 90 | (11) | - | - | (11) | 25 | - | - | - | 15 | 20 | 15 | 15 |
| 4 | Erika Hess | Switzerland | 89 | (52) | 25 | (11) | 12 | (8) | 25 | 15 | 12 | (11) | - | (10) | (12) |
| 5 | Maria Rosa Quario | Italy | 77 | | - | 25 | 15 | - | - | - | 20 | - | - | 9 | 8 |
| 6 | Dorota Tlałka | Poland | 71 | (48) | (7) | 12 | (9) | 15 | (11) | 12 | - | (10) | 12 | (11) | 20 |
| 7 | Hanni Wenzel | Liechtenstein | 65 | (7) | - | - | - | (7) | 12 | 9 | - | 8 | 11 | 25 | - |
| 8 | Małgorzata Tlałka | Poland | 64 | (5) | 15 | 10 | 20 | - | - | - | (5) | - | - | 8 | 11 |
| 9 | Christin Cooper | United States | 60 | (9) | 10 | (9) | - | 10 | 15 | - | 15 | 10 | - | - | - |
| 10 | Anni Kronbichler | Austria | 56 | (9) | (5) | - | (1) | 11 | 7 | 25 | (3) | - | - | 6 | 7 |
| 11 | Daniela Zini | Italy | 49 | | - | - | 5 | 9 | 10 | - | 25 | - | - | - | - |
| 12 | Brigitte Gadient | Switzerland | 47 | (1) | 3 | 6 | - | (1) | - | 6 | - | 20 | - | 12 | - |
| 13 | Monika Hess | Switzerland | 42 | (5) | (1) | 15 | - | 4 | 6 | - | - | 7 | 10 | (4) | - |
| 14 | Olga Charvátová | Czechoslovakia | 41 | (21) | 12 | (5) | 6 | 6 | 8 | - | 9 | (6) | - | (5) | (5) |
| 15 | Maria Epple | West Germany | 40 | | - | - | - | 5 | - | 20 | 11 | - | - | 1 | 3 |
| 16 | Brigitte Oertli | Switzerland | 34 | | - | - | - | - | - | 8 | 2 | 12 | - | 7 | 5 |
| 17 | Paoletta Magoni | Italy | 33 | (1) | 2 | 4 | - | - | - | - | 10 | - | 15 | 2 | (1) |
| 18 | Nuša Tome | Yugoslavia | 31 | (3) | 4 | 8 | - | (2) | 9 | - | 6 | (1) | 4 | - | - |
| 19 | Anja Zavadlav | Yugoslavia | 29 | | 9 | 7 | - | - | 4 | - | - | - | - | - | 9 |
| 20 | Christelle Guignard | France | 26 | | - | 1 | 7 | - | - | 10 | 8 | - | - | - | - |
| 21 | Christine von Grünigen | Switzerland | 23 | | 11 | - | - | 3 | 5 | - | 4 | - | - | - | - |
| 22 | Ursula Konzett | Liechtenstein | 21 | | - | - | - | - | - | 11 | - | 4 | - | - | 6 |
| 23 | Ewa Grabowska | Poland | 19 | | - | 2 | 8 | - | - | - | 3 | - | - | - | - |
| 24 | Alexandra Mařasová | Czechoslovakia | 13 | | - | - | - | - | 2 | 2 | - | - | 9 | - | - |
| | Ivana Valešová | Czechoslovakia | 13 | | - | - | 2 | - | 3 | - | - | - | 8 | - | - |
| 26 | Petra Wenzel | Liechtenstein | 12 | | 8 | - | - | - | - | 4 | - | - | - | - | - |
| 27 | Blanca Fernández Ochoa | Spain | 11 | | - | - | 4 | - | - | - | 7 | - | - | - | - |
| 28 | Lea Sölkner | Austria | 9 | | - | - | - | - | - | - | - | 3 | 6 | - | - |
| 29 | Polona Peharc | Yugoslavia | 6 | | 6 | - | - | - | - | - | - | - | - | - | - |
| 30 | Hélène Barbier | France | 5 | | - | - | - | - | - | 5 | - | - | - | - | - |
| | Andrea Bedard | Canada | 5 | | - | - | - | - | - | - | - | 5 | - | - | - |
| | Sylvia Eder | Austria | 5 | | - | - | - | - | - | - | - | - | 5 | - | - |
| 33 | Karin Buder | Austria | 4 | | - | - | 4 | - | - | - | - | - | - | - | - |
| 34 | Lorena Frigo | Italy | 3 | | - | 3 | - | - | - | - | - | - | - | - | - |
| | Irene Epple | West Germany | 3 | | - | - | - | - | - | 3 | - | - | - | - | - |
| | Heidi Wiesler | West Germany | 3 | | - | - | - | - | - | - | - | - | 3 | - | - |
| | Catherine Andeer | Switzerland | 3 | | - | - | - | - | - | - | - | - | - | 3 | - |
| 38 | Ľudmila Milanová | Czechoslovakia | 2 | | - | - | - | - | - | - | - | - | 2 | - | - |
| | Monika Äijä | Sweden | 2 | | - | - | - | - | - | - | - | - | - | - | 2 |
| 40 | Mateja Svet | Yugoslavia | 1 | | - | - | - | - | 1 | - | - | - | - | - | - |
| | Nadezhda Andreyeva | Soviet Union | 1 | | - | - | - | - | - | 1 | - | - | - | - | - |
| | Karen Lancaster | United States | 1 | | - | - | - | - | - | - | 1 | - | - | - | - |
| | Andreja Leskovšek | Yugoslavia | 1 | | - | - | - | - | - | - | - | - | 1 | - | - |

Alpine skiing World Cup
Women

Overall | Downhill | Giant/Super G | Slalom | Combined

1984
