= 1983 Alpine Skiing World Cup – Women's combined =

1983 Women's combined World Cup
Previous: 1982	Next: 1984

Women's combined World Cup 1982/1983

== Calendar ==
Round	Race No	Discipline	Place	Country	Date	Winner	Second	Third
1	3	Downhill; Giant	Val d'Isère	France	December 7, 1982; December 8, 1982	(Austria) Elisabeth Kirchler	(United States) Tamara McKinney	(Switzerland) Erika Hess
2	7	Downhill slalom	San Sicario; Piancavallo	Italy; Italy	December 15, 1982; December 17, 1982	(United States) Christin Cooper	(Switzerland) Erika Hess	(Liechtenstein) Hanni Wenzel
3	14	Slalom; Downhill	Schruns; Megève	Austria; France	January 16, 1983; January 21, 1983	(Czechoslovakia) Olga Charvátová	(Austria) Sylvia Eder	(France) Fabienne Serrat
4	19	Downhill slalom	Les Diablerets	Switzerland	January 29, 1983; January 30, 1983	(Liechtenstein) Hanni Wenzel	(West Germany) Michaela Gerg	(Austria) Elisabeth Kirchler

== Final point standings ==
In women's combined World Cup 1982/83 all 4 results count.

Place	Name	Country	Total points	3 (France)	7 (Italy)	14 (Austria) (France)	19 (Switzerland)
1	Hanni Wenzel	Liechtenstein	52	12	15	-	25
2	Elisabeth Kirchler	Austria	47	25	7	-	15
3	Irene Epple	West Germany	40	10	8	11	11
4	Erika Hess	Switzerland	35	15	20	-	-
5	Olga Charvátová	Czechoslovakia	31	6	-	25	-
6	Tamara McKinney	United States	30	20	-	-	10
7	Cindy Nelson	United States	29	7	-	10	12
	Sylvia Eder	Austria	29	-	-	20	9
9	Christin Cooper	United States	28	3	25	-	-
10	Heidi Wiesler	West Germany	26	4	11	7	4
11	Brigitte Oertli	Switzerland	22	-	10	12	-
12	Michaela Gerg	West Germany	20	-	-	-	20
13	Katrin Gutensohn	Austria	18	-	9	9	-
14	Zoe Haas	Switzerland	16	-	-	8	8
15	Fabienne Serrat	France	15	-	-	15	-
16	Anni Kronbichler	Austria	12	-	12	-	-
	Michela Figini	Switzerland	12	-	-	6	6
18	Maria Walliser	Switzerland	11	11	-	-	-
	Ivana Valešová	Czechoslovakia	11	-	6	-	5
20	Debbie Armstrong	United States	10	5	5	-	-
21	Laurie Graham	Canada	9	9	-	-	-
	Sonja Stotz	West Germany	9	-	2	-	7
23	Jana Gantnerová	Czechoslovakia	8	8	-	-	-
24	Marina Kiehl	West Germany	5	-	-	5	-
	Eva Twardokens	United States	5	-	3	-	2
26	Veronique Robin	Switzerland	4	-	4	-	-
	Elena Medzihradská	Czechoslovakia	4	-	-	4	-
	Dorota Tlałka	Poland	4	-	1	-	3
29	Myriam Difant	France	3	-	-	3	-
30	Françoise Bozon	France	2	2	-	-	-
31	Doris de Agostini	Switzerland	1	1	-	-	-
	Ewa Grabowska	Poland	1	-	-	-	1

Note:

Race 3 not all points were awarded (not enough finishers).

Alpine skiing World Cup
Women

Overall | Downhill | Giant/Super G | Slalom | Combined

1983
