= 1985 Alpine Skiing World Cup – Women's combined =

1985 Women's combined World Cup
Previous: 1984	Next: 1986

Women's combined World Cup 1984/1985

== Calendar ==
Round	Race No	Discipline	Place	Country	Date	Winner	Second	Third
1	5	Super G slalom	Davos	Switzerland	December 8, 1984; December 9, 1984	(Switzerland) Brigitte Oertli	(Switzerland) Erika Hess	(West Germany) Traudl Hächer
2	13	Giant; Downhill	Santa Caterina; Bad Kleinkirchheim	Italy; Austria	December 17, 1984; January 9, 1985	(Switzerland) Michela Figini	(West Germany) Marina Kiehl	(Switzerland) Maria Walliser
3	16	Downhill slalom	Bad Kleinkirchheim	Austria	January 10, 1985; January 11, 1985	(Switzerland) Brigitte Oertli	(Switzerland) Maria Walliser	(Czechoslovakia) Olga Charvátová
4	26	Slalom; Downhill	Arosa; Banff	Switzerland; Canada	January 25, 1985; March 8, 1985	(Switzerland) Michela Figini	(Czechoslovakia) Olga Charvátová	(Switzerland) Maria Walliser

== Final point standings ==
In women's combined World Cup 1984/85 all 4 results count. All four events were won by athletes from Switzerland.

Place	Name	Country	Total points	5 (Switzerland)	13 (Italy) (Austria)	16 (Austria)	26 (Switzerland) (Canada)
1	Brigitte Oertli	Switzerland	74	25	12	25	12
2	Michela Figini	Switzerland	60	-	25	10	25
3	Maria Walliser	Switzerland	50	-	15	20	15
4	Olga Charvátová	Czechoslovakia	47	9	3	15	20
5	Erika Hess	Switzerland	44	20	2	11	11
6	Elisabeth Kirchler	Austria	33	10	11	12	-
7	Marina Kiehl	West Germany	27	7	20	-	-
8	Blanca Fernández Ochoa	Spain	18	-	-	8	10
9	Traudl Hächer	West Germany	15	15	-	-	-
	Michaela Gerg	West Germany	15	11	4	-	-
11	Chatherine Andeer	Switzerland	12	12	-	-	-
	Diane Haight	Canada	12	-	5	7	-
13	Karin Dedler	West Germany	11	-	-	3	8
14	Zoe Haas	Switzerland	10	-	10	-	-
	Sylvia Eder	Austria	10	-	1	9	-
	Katrin Stotz	West Germany	10	-	6	4	-
17	Tamara McKinney	United States	9	-	9	-	-
	Vreni Schneider	Switzerland	9	-	-	-	9
19	Christelle Guignard	France	8	8	-	-	-
	Debbie Armstrong	United States	8	-	8	-	-
21	Liisa Savijarvi	Canada	7	-	7	-	-
	Veronika Wallinger	Austria	7	-	-	-	7
23	Regine Mösenlechner	West Germany	6	6	-	-	-
	Eva Twardokens	United States	6	-	-	6	-
	Anne Flore Rey	France	6	-	-	-	6
26	Andrea Bedard	Canada	5	5	-	-	-
	Angelika van der Kraats	Netherlands	5	-	-	5	-
28	Karla Delago	Italy	4	4	-	-	-
29	Christina Brichetti	Italy	3	3	-	-	-
30	Ulrike Maier	Austria	2	2	-	-	-
	Karen Percy	Canada	2	-	-	2	-
32	Marielle Studer	Switzerland	1	1	-	-	-
	Daniela Zini	Italy	1	-	-	1	-

Alpine skiing World Cup
Women

Overall | Downhill | Giant/Super G | Slalom | Combined

1985
