= 1981 Alpine Skiing World Cup – Women's downhill =

1981 Women's downhill World Cup
Previous: 1980	Next: 1982

Women's downhill World Cup 1980/1981

== Final point standings ==
In women's downhill World Cup 1980/81 the best 5 results count. Deductions are given in ().

Place	Name	Country	Total points	Deduction	1 (France)	5 (Italy)	8 (Austria)	11 (Germany)	12 (Austria)	14 (Switzerland)	19 (France)	21 (France)	25 (Austria)	28 (United States)
1	Marie-Theres Nadig	Switzerland	120	(16)	25	25	-	(2)	-	25	20	25	(5)	(9)
2	Doris de Agostini	Switzerland	110	(57)	-	(15)	20	20	25	20	25	(20)	(12)	(10)
3	Cornelia Pröll	Austria	78	(22)	(9)	(10)	12	25	-	(3)	11	15	15	-
4	Irene Epple	West Germany	71	(13)	15	-	11	10	15	-	(10)	(3)	20	-
5	Torill Fjeldstad	Norway	62		-	20	15	-	-	-	15	2	10	-
6	Jana Šoltýsová	Czechoslovakia	61	(12)	(2)	(6)	25	7	8	12	(4)	9	-	-
7	Cindy Nelson	United States	60	(10)	-	(5)	(4)	11	20	7	(1)	7	-	15
	Holly Flanders	United States	60	(21)	-	9	(5)	15	-	(8)	12	12	(8)	12
9	Elisabeth Kirchler	Austria	42		-	-	-	5	-	5	-	-	7	25
	Hanni Wenzel	Liechtenstein	42	(4)	-	-	-	8	10	-	5	(4)	11	8
11	Maria Walliser	Switzerland	41		7	-	-	-	-	9	8	11	6	-
12	Gerry Sorensen	Canada	39		-	-	-	-	-	-	3	11	25	-
13	Edith Peter	Austria	35		-	7	1	12	9	-	-	6	-	-
	Marie-Luce Waldmeier	France	33	(1)	10	8	-	-	4	6	-	-	(1)	5
15	Kathy Kreiner	Canada	32		20	-	-	-	3	-	9	-	-	-
	Marie-Cécile Gros-Gaudenier	France	32	(3)	-	4	3	-	-	11	6	8	-	(3)
17	Regine Mösenlechner	West Germany	29		-	-	-	-	-	-	-	-	9	20
18	Lea Sölkner	Austria	26		12	-	10	-	-	-	-	-	-	4
19	Cindy Oak	United States	25		-	-	6	10	5	4	-	-	-	-
	Heidi Preuss	United States	25		-	-	9	-	11	-	-	5	-	-
21	Christa Kinshofer	West Germany	21		6	-	-	-	-	15	-	-	-	-
22	Caroline Attia	France	20		8	-	-	-	12	-	-	-	-	-
	Zoe Haas	Switzerland	20		11	-	-	-	-	-	2	-	-	7
24	Ingrid Eberle	Austria	17		2	2	9	-	-	-	-	-	4	-
25	Traudl Hächer	West Germany	16		4	-	-	1	-	1	8	-	2	-
26	Annemarie Bischofberger	Switzerland	14		-	12	2	-	-	-	-	-	-	-
27	Élisabeth Chaud	France	13		-	-	-	-	7	-	-	-	-	6
28	Laurie Graham	Canada	11		-	11	-	-	-	-	-	-	-	-
	Elisabeth Kraml	Austria	11		-	-	-	-	1	10	-	-	-	-
	Sylvia Eder	Austria	11		-	-	-	-	-	-	-	-	-	11
31	Olga Charvátová	Czechoslovakia	7		-	-	7	-	-	-	-	-	-	-
32	Christina Klossner	Switzerland	6		-	-	-	6	-	-	-	-	-	-
	Erika Gfrerer	Austria	6		-	-	-	-	6	-	-	-	-	-
34	Erika Hess	Switzerland	5		5	-	-	-	-	-	-	-	-	-
35	Annemarie Steiner	Austria	4		-	-	-	4	-	-	-	-	-	-
36	Marianne Zechmeister	West Germany	3		3	-	-	-	-	-	-	-	-	-
	Ariane Ehrat	Switzerland	3		-	3	-	-	-	-	-	-	-	-
	Heidi Wiesler	West Germany	3		-	-	-	3	-	-	-	-	-	-
	Edith Lindner	Austria	3		-	-	-	-	2	-	-	1	-	-
	Andrea Haaser	Austria	3		-	-	-	-	-	-	-	-	3	-
	Catherine Quittet	France	3		-	-	-	-	-	2	-	-	-	1
42	Christin Cooper	United States	2		-	-	-	-	-	-	-	-	-	2
43	Maria Maricich	United States	1		-	1	-	-	-	-	-	-	-	-

Alpine skiing World Cup
Women

Overall | Downhill | Giant slalom | Slalom | Combined

1981
