= 1981 Alpine Skiing World Cup – Women's combined =

1981 Women's combined World Cup
| Previous: 1980 | Next: 1982 |

Women's combined World Cup 1980/1981

== Final point standings ==
In women's combined World Cup 1980/81 all 5 results count.

| Place | Name | Country | Total points | 3 (France) | 6 (Italy) | 16 (Switzerland) | 20 (France) | 26 (Germany) (Austria) |
|---|---|---|---|---|---|---|---|---|
| 1 | Marie-Theres Nadig | Switzerland | 86 | 25 | 25 | 9 | 15 | 12 |
| 2 | Hanni Wenzel | Liechtenstein | 62 | - | - | 12 | 25 | 25 |
| 3 | Christa Kinshofer | West Germany | 52 | 15 | - | 25 | 12 | - |
| 4 | Erika Hess | Switzerland | 51 | 8 | 15 | 20 | - | 8 |
| 5 | Fabienne Serrat | France | 50 | 11 | 20 | 10 | 9 | - |
| 6 | Christin Cooper | United States | 41 | - | 11 | 15 | - | 15 |
| 7 | Cindy Nelson | United States | 40 | 5 | 10 | 11 | 10 | 4 |
| 8 | Perrine Pelen | France | 35 | 12 | 12 | - | 11 | - |
| | Maria Walliser | Switzerland | 35 | - | 9 | 6 | - | 20 |
| 10 | Irene Epple | West Germany | 31 | 20 | - | 4 | - | 7 |
| 11 | Zoe Haas | Switzerland | 24 | 9 | 8 | - | 7 | - |
| 12 | Tamara McKinney | United States | 22 | 2 | - | - | 20 | - |
| 13 | Olga Charvátová | Czechoslovakia | 21 | 3 | - | 8 | - | 10 |
| 14 | Heidi Preuss | United States | 19 | - | 6 | - | 8 | 5 |
| 15 | Abbi Fisher | United States | 18 | - | - | 7 | 5 | 6 |
| 16 | Regine Mösenlechner | West Germany | 17 | - | - | - | 6 | 11 |
| 17 | Kathy Kreiner | Canada | 14 | 7 | 7 | - | - | - |
| 18 | Traudl Hächer | West Germany | 13 | 1 | 3 | - | - | 9 |
| | Heidi Wiesler | West Germany | 13 | - | 5 | 5 | - | 3 |
| 20 | Lea Sölkner | Austria | 10 | 10 | - | - | - | - |
| 21 | Petra Wenzel | Liechtenstein | 8 | 6 | - | - | - | 2 |
| 22 | Michaela Gerg | West Germany | 4 | 4 | - | - | - | - |
| | Gerry Sorensen | Canada | 4 | - | 4 | - | - | - |
| | Erika Gfrerer | Austria | 4 | - | - | - | 4 | - |
| 25 | Brigitte Gadient | Switzerland | 3 | - | - | 3 | - | - |
| | Holly Flanders | United States | 3 | - | - | - | 3 | - |
| 27 | Diane Haight | Canada | 2 | - | 2 | - | - | - |
| | Metka Jerman | Yugoslavia | 2 | - | - | 2 | - | - |
| | Andrea Haaser | Austria | 2 | - | - | - | 2 | - |
| 30 | Monika Henkel | West Germany | 1 | - | 1 | - | - | - |
| | Anja Zavadlav | Yugoslavia | 1 | - | - | 1 | - | - |
| | Inge Krenn | Austria | 1 | - | - | - | 1 | - |
| | Sylvia Eder | Austria | 1 | - | - | - | - | 1 |

== Women's Combined Team Results ==
All points were shown. bold indicate highest score - italics indicate race wins

| Place | Country | Total points | 3 (France) | 6 (Italy) | 16 (Switzerland) | 20 (France) | 26 (Germany) (Austria) | Racers | Wins |
|---|---|---|---|---|---|---|---|---|---|
| 1 | Switzerland | 199 | 42 | **57** | 38 | 22 | 40 | 5 | 2 |
| 2 | United States | 143 | 7 | 27 | 33 | 46 | 30 | 6 | 0 |
| 3 | West Germany | 131 | 40 | 9 | 34 | 18 | 30 | 7 | 1 |
| 4 | France | 85 | 23 | 32 | 10 | 20 | - | 2 | 0 |
| 5 | Liechtenstein | 70 | 6 | - | 12 | 25 | 27 | 2 | 2 |
| 6 | Czechoslovakia | 21 | 3 | - | 8 | - | 10 | 1 | 0 |
| 7 | Canada | 20 | 7 | 13 | - | - | - | 3 | 0 |
| 8 | Austria | 18 | 10 | - | - | 7 | 1 | 5 | 0 |
| 9 | Yugoslavia | 3 | - | - | 3 | - | - | 2 | 0 |

**Alpine skiing World Cup**
**Women**

Overall | Downhill | Giant slalom | Slalom | Combined

**1981**
