= 1981 Alpine Skiing World Cup – Women's slalom =

1981 Women's slalom World Cup
Previous: 1980	Next: 1982

Women's slalom World Cup 1980/1981

== Final point standings ==
In women's slalom World Cup 1980/81 the best 5 results count. Deductions are given in brackets.

Place	Name	Country	Total points	Deduction	7 (Italy)	9 (Austria)	10 (Italy)	13 (Austria)	15 (Switzerland)	22 (Switzerland)	23 (Germany)	31 (Japan)	32 (Switzerland)
1	Erika Hess	Switzerland	125	(60)	(20)	-	(15)	25	25	25	25	25	(25)
2	Christin Cooper	United States	86	(29)	11	(9)	(10)	(10)	20	20	15	20	-
3	Daniela Zini	Italy	81	(19)	-	15	-	11	(11)	15	20	(8)	20
	Perrine Pelen	France	81	(17)	10	25	25	-	-	11	(8)	(9)	10
5	Fabienne Serrat	France	63	(11)	25	11	10	-	7	10	(2)	(2)	(7)
6	Hanni Wenzel	Liechtenstein	59		-	-	-	12	15	-	10	10	12
7	Tamara McKinney	United States	52		5	-	-	15	-	9	-	12	11
8	Piera Macchi	Italy	51		-	12	-	8	8	12	-	11	-
9	Nadezhda Patrikeyeva	Soviet Union	46		12	7	20	-	-	1	-	6	-
10	Claudia Giordani	Italy	43		-	8	11	20	-	4	-	-	-
11	Maria Rosa Quario	Italy	35		15	10	-	6	-	-	-	4	-
12	Maria Epple	West Germany	31		-	-	2	-	3	-	11	15	-
13	Ursula Konzett	Liechtenstein	30		8	-	12	-	10	-	-	-	-
	Brigitte Glur	Switzerland	30		-	-	4	-	5	7	-	5	9
15	Abbi Fisher	United States	29		7	-	5	5	12	-	-	-	-
	Christa Kinshofer	West Germany	29		-	20	-	-	9	-	-	-	-
	Cindy Nelson	United States	29		-	6	8	4	4	-	-	7	-
18	Olga Charvátová	Czechoslovakia	25		-	-	-	7	6	-	12	-	-
19	Maria Walliser	Switzerland	22		-	-	-	-	-	-	7	-	15
20	Bojana Dornig	Yugoslavia	21		9	-	7	-	-	-	-	-	5
21	Wanda Bieler	Italy	15		-	-	3	-	-	-	9	3	-
22	Anja Zavadlav	Yugoslavia	12		-	-	6	-	-	6	-	-	-
	Anne Flore Rey	France	12		-	-	-	1	-	5	-	-	6
24	Brigitte Nansoz	Switzerland	11		-	-	-	3	-	8	-	-	-
25	Regine Mösenlechner	West Germany	10		-	-	-	9	-	-	1	-	-
26	Nataša Blažič	Yugoslavia	8		-	-	-	-	-	-	-	-	8
	Roswitha Steiner	Austria	8		-	5	-	-	-	-	-	-	3
28	Traudl Hächer	West Germany	7		3	-	-	-	-	-	4	-	-
	Marie-Theres Nadig	Switzerland	7		-	-	-	-	-	-	6	1	-
30	Sylviane Fabre	France	6		6	-	-	-	-	-	-	-	-
	Lorena Frigo	Italy	6		4	2	-	-	-	-	-	-	-
32	Paoletta Magoni	Italy	5		2	1	-	-	2	-	-	-	-
	Rosi Aschenwald	Austria	5		-	-	-	-	-	-	5	-	-
	Regina Sackl	Austria	5		-	-	-	-	-	2	3	-	-
35	Ingrid Eberle	Austria	4		-	4	-	-	-	-	-	-	-
	Andreja Leskovšek	Yugoslavia	4		-	-	-	-	-	-	-	-	4
37	Lea Sölkner	Austria	3		-	3	-	-	-	-	-	-	-
	Sylvia Bonfini	Italy	3		-	-	-	-	-	3	-	-	-
39	Małgorzata Tlałka	Poland	2		-	-	-	2	-	-	-	-	-
	Paola Marciandi	Italy	2		1	-	-	-	1	-	-	-	-
	Karin Unterseer	West Germany	2		-	-	-	-	-	-	-	-	2
42	Rita Näpflini	Switzerland	1		-	-	1	-	-	-	-	-	-
	Irene Epple	West Germany	1		-	-	-	-	-	-	-	-	1

== Women's slalom team results ==
All points were shown including individual deduction. Bold indicates highest score - italics indicate race wins.

Place	Country	Total points	7 (Italy)	9 (Austria)	10 (Italy)	13 (Austria)	15 (Switzerland)	22 (Switzerland)	23 (Germany)	31 (Japan)	32 (Switzerland)	Racers	Wins
1	Italy	260	22	48	14	45	22	34	29	26	20	9	0
2	Switzerland	256	20	-	20	28	30	40	38	31	**49**	6	6
3	United States	225	23	15	23	34	36	29	15	39	11	4	0
4	France	190	41	36	35	1	7	26	10	11	23	4	3
5	Liechtenstein	89	8	-	12	12	25	-	10	10	12	2	0
6	West Germany	80	3	20	2	9	12	-	16	15	3	6	0
7	Soviet Union	46	12	7	20	-	-	1	-	6	-	1	0
8	Yugoslavia	45	9	-	13	-	-	6	-	-	17	4	0
9	Austria	25	-	12	-	-	-	2	8	-	3	5	0
	Czechoslovakia	25	-	-	-	7	6	-	12	-	-	1	0
11	Poland	1	-	-	-	-	1	-	-	-	-	1	0

**Alpine skiing World Cup**
**Women**

Overall | Downhill | Giant slalom | **Slalom** | Combined

**1981**
