= 1981 Alpine Skiing World Cup – Women's giant slalom =

1981 Women's giant slalom World Cup
| Previous: 1980 | Next: 1982 |

Women's giant slalom World Cup 1980/1981

== Final point standings ==
In women's giant slalom World Cup 1980/81 the best 5 results count. Deductions are given in ().

| Place | Name | Country | Total points | Deduction | 1 (France) | 4 (Italy) | 17 (Switzerland) | 18 (France) | 24 (Germany) | 27 (Socialist Federal Republic of Yugoslavia) | 29 (United States) | 30 (Japan) | 33 (Switzerland) |
|---|---|---|---|---|---|---|---|---|---|---|---|---|---|
| 1 | Tamara McKinney | United States | 102 | (19) | (10) | - | 25 | 25 | 15 | (9) | 25 | 12 | - |
| 2 | Marie-Theres Nadig | Switzerland | 97 | (16) | 11 | 25 | 11 | (6) | (10) | 25 | - | 25 | - |
| 3 | Erika Hess | Switzerland | 78 | (10) | (6) | 11 | (2) | - | (2) | 12 | 20 | 10 | 25 |
| | Hanni Wenzel | Liechtenstein | 78 | (12) | - | - | 20 | 15 | 8 | (8) | (4) | 20 | 15 |
| | Irene Epple | West Germany | 78 | (13) | 25 | - | 15 | - | (5) | 15 | (8) | 11 | 12 |
| 6 | Maria Epple | West Germany | 71 | (7) | (1) | - | - | 12 | 25 | 20 | 7 | (6) | 7 |
| 7 | Christin Cooper | United States | 69 | (10) | - | (8) | 12 | - | 11 | 11 | (2) | 15 | 20 |
| 8 | Christa Kinshofer | West Germany | 63 | | 15 | - | 8 | 20 | 20 | - | - | - | - |
| 9 | Wanda Bieler | Italy | 60 | (2) | - | 12 | 10 | 11 | 12 | - | 15 | - | (2) |
| | Perrine Pelen | France | 60 | (10) | 20 | 10 | (5) | 9 | 9 | (5) | 12 | - | - |
| 11 | Daniela Zini | Italy | 56 | | 8 | 20 | 9 | 10 | - | - | 9 | - | - |
| 12 | Cindy Nelson | United States | 48 | (8) | (4) | - | 6 | (4) | - | 10 | 11 | 10 | 11 |
| 13 | Fabienne Serrat | France | 45 | (9) | 12 | 15 | - | 5 | 7 | - | (5) | (4) | 6 |
| 14 | Olga Charvátová | Czechoslovakia | 31 | (1) | 7 | - | - | 3 | - | 3 | (1) | 8 | 10 |
| 15 | Maria Rosa Quario | Italy | 29 | | 3 | 9 | - | 8 | - | - | 6 | 3 | - |
| 16 | Traudl Hächer | West Germany | 19 | | - | - | - | - | - | - | 10 | - | 9 |
| 17 | Claudia Giordani | Italy | 18 | | - | 7 | 4 | 7 | - | - | - | - | - |
| 18 | Zoe Haas | Switzerland | 14 | | - | 6 | 1 | - | - | 7 | - | - | - |
| | Maria Walliser | Switzerland | 14 | | - | 5 | - | - | - | 4 | - | 5 | - |
| 20 | Michaela Gerg | West Germany | 13 | | 5 | - | - | - | 4 | - | - | - | 4 |
| 21 | Anni Kronbichler | Austria | 10 | | - | - | 7 | - | 3 | - | - | - | - |
| 22 | Petra Wenzel | Liechtenstein | 9 | | 9 | - | - | - | - | - | - | - | - |
| 23 | Élisabeth Chaud | France | 8 | | - | - | - | - | - | - | - | - | 8 |
| 24 | Brigitte Glur | Switzerland | 7 | | - | - | - | - | - | - | - | 7 | - |
| 25 | Lea Sölkner | Austria | 6 | | 2 | 4 | - | - | - | - | - | - | - |
| | Heidi Wiesler | West Germany | 6 | | - | - | - | - | 6 | - | - | - | - |
| | Anne Flore Rey | France | 6 | | - | - | - | - | - | 6 | - | - | - |
| 28 | Regine Mösenlechner | West Germany | 5 | | - | - | 3 | - | - | 2 | - | - | - |
| | Roswitha Steiner | Austria | 5 | | - | - | - | - | - | - | - | - | 5 |
| 30 | Karen Lanchaster | United States | 3 | | - | 3 | - | - | - | - | - | - | - |
| | Nadezhda Patrakeeva Andreeva | Soviet Union | 3 | | - | - | - | - | - | - | 3 | - | - |
| | Kathy Kreiner | Canada | 3 | | - | 2 | - | - | - | - | - | 1 | - |
| | Corine Eugster | Switzerland | 3 | | - | - | - | - | - | - | - | - | 3 |
| 34 | Heidi Preuss | United States | 2 | | - | - | - | 2 | - | - | - | - | - |
| | Gerry Sorensen | Canada | 2 | | - | - | - | - | - | - | - | 2 | - |
| 36 | Paola Marciandi | Italy | 1 | | - | 1 | - | - | - | - | - | - | - |
| | Piera Macchi | Italy | 1 | | - | - | - | 1 | - | - | - | - | - |
| | Blanca Fernández Ochoa | Spain | 1 | | - | - | - | - | 1 | - | - | - | - |
| | Erika Gfrerer | Austria | 1 | | - | - | - | - | - | 1 | - | - | - |
| | Inge Krenn | Austria | 1 | | - | - | - | - | - | - | - | - | 1 |

== Women's giant slalom team results ==
All points were shown including individual deduction. bold indicate highest score - italics indicate race wins

| Place | Country | Total points | 1 (France) | 4 (Italy) | 17 (Switzerland) | 18 (France) | 24 (Germany) | 27 (Socialist Federal Republic of Yugoslavia) | 29 (United States) | 30 (Japan) | 33 (Switzerland) | Racers | Wins |
|---|---|---|---|---|---|---|---|---|---|---|---|---|---|
| 1 | West Germany | 275 | 46 | - | 26 | 32 | **60** | 37 | 25 | 17 | 32 | 7 | 2 |
| 2 | United States | 261 | 14 | 11 | 43 | 31 | 26 | 30 | 38 | 37 | 31 | 5 | 3 |
| 3 | Switzerland | 239 | 17 | 47 | 14 | 6 | 12 | 48 | 20 | 47 | 28 | 6 | 4 |
| 4 | Italy | 167 | 11 | 49 | 23 | 37 | 12 | - | 30 | 3 | 2 | 6 | 0 |
| 5 | France | 138 | 32 | 25 | 5 | 14 | 16 | 11 | 17 | 4 | 14 | 4 | 0 |
| 6 | Liechtenstein | 99 | 9 | - | 20 | 15 | 8 | 8 | 4 | 20 | 15 | 2 | 0 |
| 7 | Czechoslovakia | 32 | 7 | - | - | 3 | - | 3 | 1 | 8 | 10 | 1 | 0 |
| 8 | Austria | 23 | 2 | 4 | 7 | - | 3 | 1 | - | - | 6 | 5 | 0 |
| 9 | Canada | 5 | - | 2 | - | - | - | - | - | 3 | - | 2 | 0 |
| 10 | Soviet Union | 3 | - | - | - | - | - | - | 3 | - | - | 1 | 0 |
| 11 | Spain | 1 | - | - | - | - | 1 | - | - | - | - | 1 | 0 |

**Alpine skiing World Cup**
**Women**

Overall | Downhill | Giant slalom | Slalom | Combined

**1981**
