= Tlałka-Mogore =

Tlałka-Mogore is a surname. Notable people with the surname include:

- Dorota Tlałka-Mogore (1963-2025), Polish-French alpine skier
- Małgorzata Tlałka-Mogore (bien 1963), Polish alpine skier
