= Nadia Delago =

Italian alpine skier (born 1997)

Personal information
- Born: 12 November 1997 (age 28) Brixen, South Tyrol, Italy
- Family: Nicol Delago (sister); Oskar Delago (uncle); Karla Delago (aunt)

Skiing career
- Country: Italy
- Sport: Alpine skiing
- Disciplines: Downhill, super-G
- World Cup debut: 20 January 2019 (age 21)

Olympics
- Teams: 2 – (2022, 2026)
- Medals: 1 (0 gold)

World Championships
- Teams: 1 – (2021)
- Medals: 0

World Cup
- Seasons: 8 – (2019–2026)
- Podiums: 0
- Overall titles: 0 – (34th in 2022)
- Discipline titles: 0 – (8th in DH, 2022)
Medal record
Women's alpine skiing
Representing Italy
Olympic Games
| Bronze medal – third place | 2022 Beijing | Downhill |

Nadia Delago (born 12 November 1997) is an Italian World Cup alpine ski racer. She won a bronze medal in the downhill at the 2022 Winter Olympics.

She is the sister of Nicol Delago.

== Family ==
Four Alpine skiers from the Delago family have participated in World Cup and World Championships competitions. Siblings Oskar (born 1963) and Karla Delago (born 1965), specialists in speed events in the 1980s and their two nieces, Nicol (born 1996) and Nadia (born 1997), active in the 2010s.

== World Cup results ==
=== Season standings ===
Season
| Season | Age | Overall | Slalom | Giant slalom | Super G | Downhill | Combined |
| 2019 | 21 | 120 | — | — | — | 49 | 26 |
| 2020 | 22 | 86 | — | — | 53 | 40 | 34 |
| 2021 | 23 | 55 | — | — | — | 20 | —N/a |
| 2022 | 24 | 34 | — | — | 44 | 8 | —N/a |
| 2023 | 25 | 88 | — | — | — | 33 | —N/a |
| 2024 | 26 | 87 | — | — | 54 | 34 | —N/a |
| 2025 | 27 | 74 | — | — | 51 | 25 | —N/a |
| 2026 | 28 | 60 | — | — | 52 | 20 | —N/a |

=== Top ten finishes ===
- 0 podiums; 7 top tens (7 DH)

Season
| Season | Date | Location | Discipline | Place |
| 2021 | 22 January 2021 | Crans Montana, Switzerland | Downhill | 10th |
| 2022 | 3 December 2021 | Lake Louise, Canada | Downhill | 6th |
| 2022 | 4 December 2021 | Lake Louise, Canada | Downhill | 6th |
| 2022 | 18 December 2021 | Val-d'Isère, France | Downhill | 8th |
| 2022 | 15 January 2022 | Zauchensee, Austria | Downhill | 4th |
| 2022 | 29 January 2022 | Garmisch-Partenkirchen, Germany | Downhill | 5th |
| 2026 | 17 January 2026 | Tarvisio, Italy | Downhill | 10th |

== World Championship results ==
Year
| Year | Age | Slalom | Giant slalom | Super G | Downhill | Combined | Team event |
| 2021 | 23 | — | — | — | 15 | DNF | 8 |

== Olympic results ==
Year
| Year | Age | Slalom | Giant slalom | Super G | Downhill | Combined | Team combined |
| 2022 | 24 | — | — | — | 3 | — | —N/a |
| 2026 | 28 | — | — | — | — | —N/a | DNF2 |
