= Nicol Delago =

Italian alpine skier (born 1996)

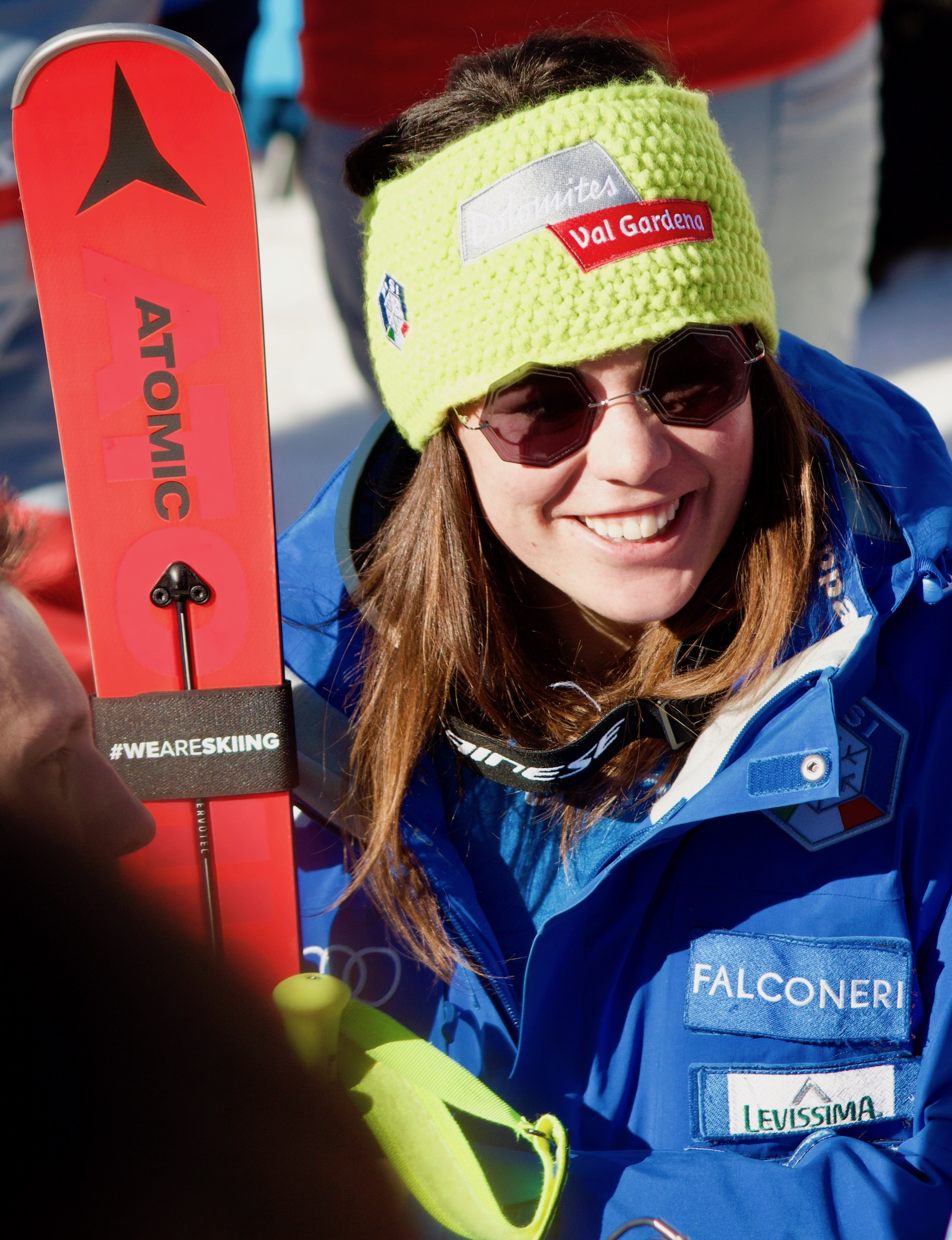
- Delago in 2019

Personal information
- Born: 5 January 1996 (age 30) Brixen, South Tyrol, Italy
- Height: 1.73 m (5 ft 8 in)
- Family: Nadia Delago (sister); Oskar Delago (uncle); Karla Delago (aunt)

Skiing career
- Country: Italy
- Sport: Alpine skiing
- Club: G.S. Fiamme Gialle
- Disciplines: Downhill, Super-G, Combined
- World Cup debut: 24 January 2015 (age 19)

Olympics
- Teams: 3 – (2018, 2022, 2026)
- Medals: 0

World Championships
- Teams: 3 – (2019, 2023, 2025)
- Medals: 0

World Cup
- Seasons: 12 – (2015–2026)
- Wins: 1 – (1 DH)
- Podiums: 6 – (5 DH, 1 SG)
- Overall titles: 0 – (28th in 2020)
- Discipline titles: 0 – (8th in DH, 2019 and 2026)
Medal record
Women's alpine skiing
Representing Italy
World Cup race podiums
Event	1st	2nd	3rd
Downhill	1	2	2
Super-G	0	1	0
Total	1	3	2
Junior World Championships
Bronze medal – third place	2015 Hafjell	Downhill
Bronze medal – third place	2016 Sochi	Downhill

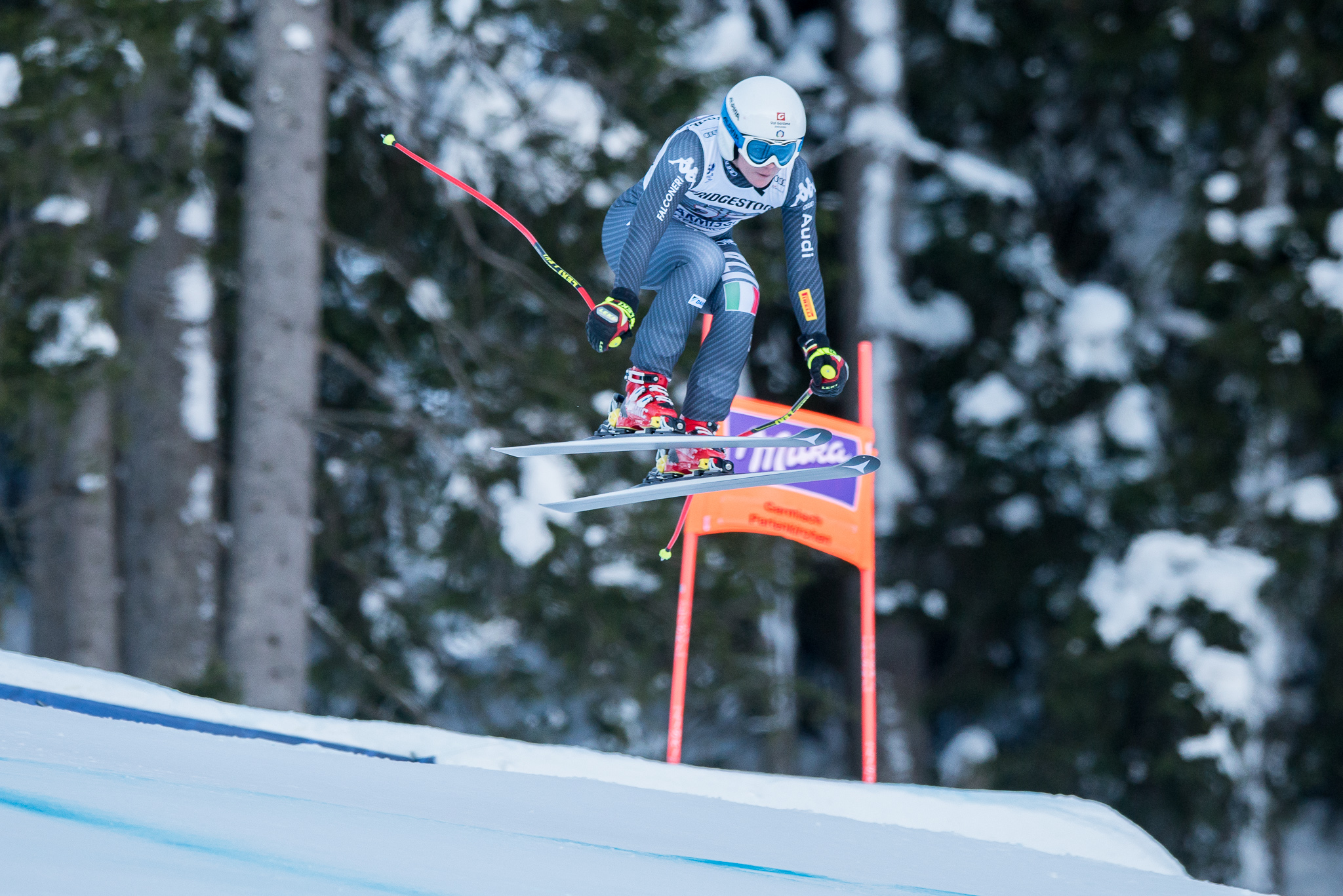
Delago during a jump in the Garmisch-Partenkirchen Kandahar downhill in 2017.

Nicol Delago (born 5 January 1996) is an Italian World Cup alpine ski racer, and specializes in the speed events. She represented Italy at two Winter Olympics, and made her first World Cup podium in Italy in December 2018.

She is the sister of Nadia Delago.

== Biography ==
Born in Brixen in South Tyrol, Delago won two bronze medals in downhill at the World Junior Championships, in 2015 and 2016.

Four Alpine skiers from the Delago family have participated in World Cup and World Championships competitions. Siblings Oskar (born 1963) and Karla Delago (b.1965), specialists in speed events in the 1980s and their two nieces, Nicol and Nadia (b.1997), active in the 2010s.

== World Cup results ==
=== Season standings ===
Season
Season	Age	Overall	Slalom	Giant slalom	Super-G	Downhill	Combined
2016	20	98	—	—	—	53	32
2017	21	81	—	—	—	37	33
2018	22	56	—	—	34	28	19
2019	23	31	—	—	31	8	18
2020	24	28	—	—	19	19	33
2021	25	Injured, out for almost entire season					
2022	26	53	—	—	33	27	—N/a
2023	27	57	—	—	45	24	—N/a
2024	28	40	—	—	43	13	—N/a
2025	29	65	—	—	39	23	—N/a
2026	30	33	—	—	39	8	—N/a

=== Race podiums ===
- 1 win – (1 DH)
- 6 podiums – (5 DH, 1 SG); 18 top tens

Season
Season	Date	Location	Discipline	Place
2019	18 December 2018	Val Gardena, Italy	Downhill	2nd
2020	8 December 2019	Lake Louise, Canada	Super-G	2nd
2020	11 January 2020	Zauchensee, Austria	Downhill	2nd
2024	13 January 2024	Zauchensee, Austria	Downhill	3rd
2024	23 March 2024	Saalbach, Austria	Downhill	3rd
2026	17 January 2026	Tarvisio, Italy	Downhill	1st

== World Championship results ==
Year
Year	Age	Slalom	Giant slalom	Super-G	Downhill	Combined	Team combined
2019	23	—	—	—	6	12	—N/a
2021	25	Injured, did not compete					—N/a
2023	27	—	—	—	18	—	—N/a
2025	29	—	—	—	8	—N/a	8

== Olympic results ==
Year
Year	Age	Slalom	Giant slalom	Super-G	Downhill	Combined	Team combined
2018	22	—	—	—	DNF	—	—N/a
2022	26	—	—	—	11	DNF2	—N/a
2026	30	—	—	—	11	—N/a	10

== See also ==
- Italy at the 2018 Winter Olympics
