= Oskar Delago =

Italian alpine skier

Personal information
- Born: 25 March 1963 (age 63) Brixen, Italy

Skiing career
- Sport: Alpine skiing
- Retired: 1984
- Disciplines: Speed events
- World Cup debut: 1982

World Championships
- Teams: 1
- Medals: 0

World Cup
- Seasons: 3
- Podiums: 0

Oskar Delago (born 25 March 1963) is a former Italian World Cup alpine ski racer.

== Family ==
Four Alpine skiers from the Delago family have participated in World Cup and World Championships competitions. Siblings Oskar (born 1963) and Karla Delago (born 1965), specialists in speed events in the 1980s, and their two granddaughters, Nicol (born 1996) and Nadia (born 1997), active in the 2010s.

== World Championships results ==
Year
Year	Age	Slalom	Giant; Slalom	Downhill	Combined
1982	18	–	–	21	–
