= Karla Delago =

Italian alpine skier

Personal information
- Born: 8 February 1965 (age 61) Gardena, Italy

Skiing career
- Sport: Alpine skiing
- Retired: 1987
- Disciplines: Speed events
- World Cup debut: 1985

World Cup
- Seasons: 3

Karla Delago (born 8 February 1965) is a former Italian World Cup alpine ski racer, and specializes in the speed events, winner of six Italian titles in just four years in which she competed.

== Family ==
Four Alpine skiers from the Delago family have participated in World Cup and World Championships competitions. Siblings Oskar (born 1963) and Karla Delago (born 1965), specialists in speed events in the 1980s and their two granddaughters, Nicol (born 1996) and Nadia (born 1997), active in the 2010s.

== Career ==
Karla Delago's career began in 1983–84 at the age of 18 when she made her debut in the world cup by scoring (i.e. classified among the top 15), 17 times in only 18 races. However, following an injury she had in the summer of 1987, she never returned to compete, just when she had obtained the qualification for the 1988 Calgary Olympics. As a result, her competitive career ended at the age of 22 after her injury prevented her from returning to competition.

== World Cup results ==
Top 10

Date	Place	Discipline	Rank
1 February 1986	(Switzerland) Crans Montana	Downhill	7
12 January 1986	(Austria) Bad Gastein	Combined	7
7 December 1985	(Italy) Sestriere	Super G	8
9 January 1985	(Austria) Bad Kleinkirchheim	Downhill	9

== National titles ==
- Italian Alpine Ski Championships
  - Downhill: 1983, 1984, 1985, 1986
  - Combined: 1983, 1986
