= Veronika Vitzthum =

Austrian alpine skier

Personal information
- Born: 11 March 1963 (age 63) Unken, Austria

Skiing career
- Sport: Alpine skiing
- Retired: 1986
- Disciplines: Speed events
- World Cup debut: 1982

World Cup
- Seasons: 5
Medal record
Women's alpine skiing
Representing Austria
World Cup race podiums
Event	1st	2nd	3rd
Downhill	0	2	1

Veronika Vitzthum (born 11 March 1963) is a former Austrian alpine skier.

== Career ==
During her career she has achieved 12 results among the top 10 (3 podiums) in the World Cup.

== World Cup results ==
Top 3

Date	Place	Discipline	Rank
21-12-1984	(Italy) Santa Caterina	Downhill	2
07-01-1984	(France) Puy St. Vincent	Downhill	2
29-01-1983	(Switzerland) Les Diablerets	Downhill	3
