= Heidi Preuss =

American alpine skier (born 1961)

Heidi Preuss (born 18 March 1961 in Lakeport, New Hampshire) is an American former alpine skier who competed in the 1980 Winter Olympics. She is the daughter of the late Remo Preuss of Jena Germany and Elfriede Preuss of Lubeck Germany.
