= Puy-Saint-Vincent =

- Commune
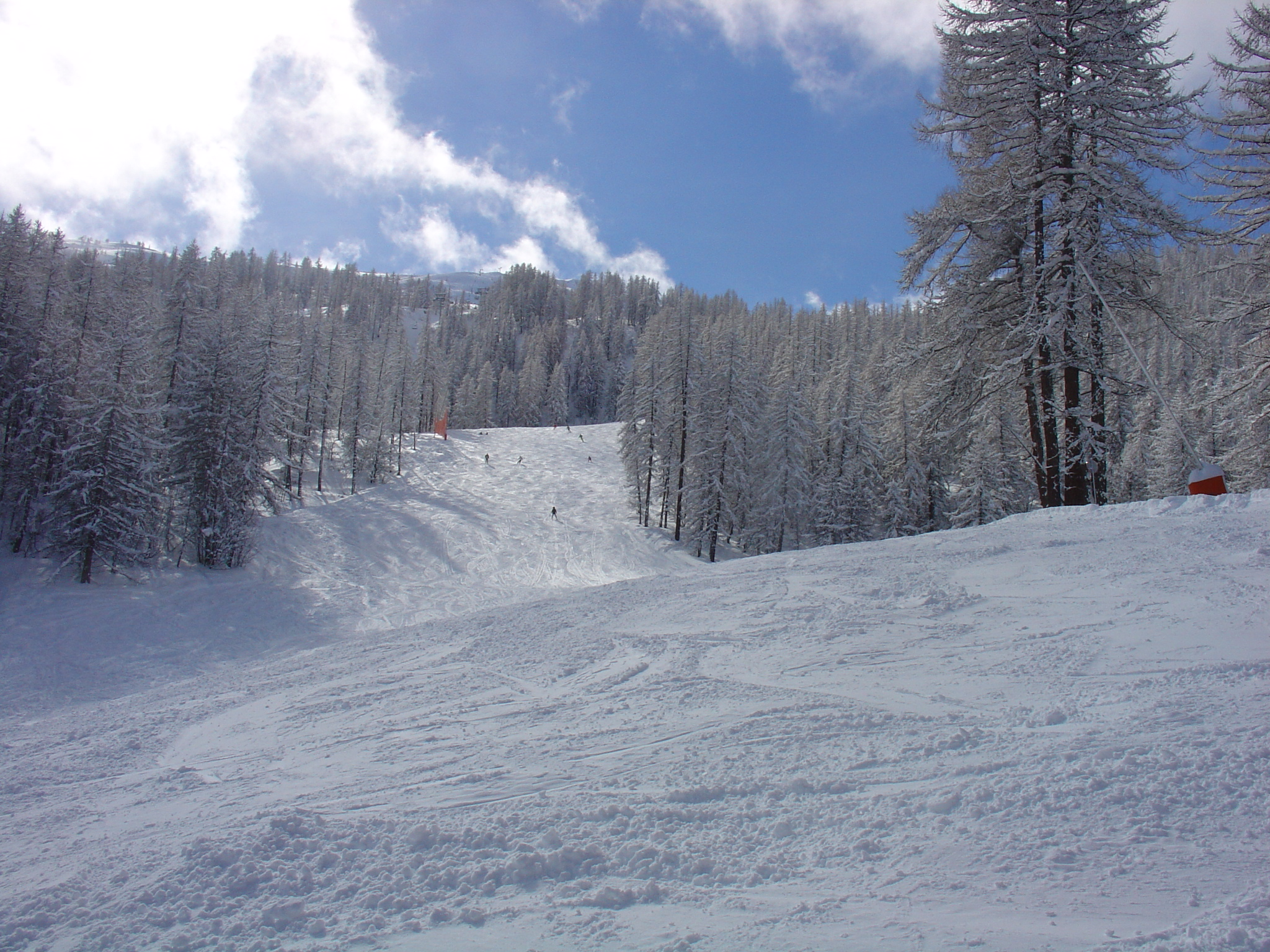
- Ski run

- Coat of arms
- Location of Puy-Saint-Vincent
- Location within France Location within Provence-Alpes-Côte d'Azur
- Coordinates: 44°49′51″N 6°29′16″E
- Country: France
- Region: Provence-Alpes-Côte d'Azur
- Department: Hautes-Alpes
- Arrondissement: Briançon
- Canton: L'Argentière-la-Bessée
- Intercommunality: Pays des Écrins

Government
  - Mayor (2026–32): Didier Pluquet
- Area^{1}: 22.98 km^{2} (8.87 sq mi)
- Elevation: 1,380 m (4,530 ft)
- Highest elevation: 3,303 m (10,837 ft)
- Lowest elevation: 1,155 m (3,789 ft)
- Population (2023): 270
  - Density: 12/km^{2} (30/sq mi)
- Time zone: UTC+01:00 (CET)
  - Summer (DST): UTC+02:00 (CEST)
- INSEE/Postal code: 05110 /05290
- ^{1} French Land Register data, which excludes lakes, ponds, glaciers > 1 km^{2} (0.386 sq mi or 247 acres) and river estuaries.

Puy-Saint-Vincent (French pronunciation: [pɥi sɛ̃ vɛ̃sɑ̃]; Occitan: Puei Sant Vincent) is a commune in the Hautes-Alpes department in southeastern France.

== Population ==
Historical population
Year	Pop.	±% p.a.
1968	117	—
1975	171	+5.57%
1982	298	+8.26%
1990	235	−2.93%
1999	267	+1.43%
2007	293	+1.17%
2012	286	−0.48%
2017	288	+0.14%
2023	270	−1.07%
Source: INSEE

== See also ==
- Communes of the Hautes-Alpes department
