= Ariane Ehrat =

Swiss alpine skier (born 1961)

Medal record

Women's alpine skiing

World Championships
Silver medal – second place	1985 Bormio	Downhill

Ariane Ehrat (born February 17, 1961, in Schaffhausen) is a former Swiss alpine skier. She was active between 1979 and 1986, with her best performance a silver medal at the 1985 Alpine World Ski Championships in Bormio.

== Career ==
At the 1984 Olympic Games in Sarajevo she narrowly missed the podium and finished fourth in the downhill ski race.

Since her retirement from skiing, Ehrat has worked in marketing. From 1989 she performed as the head of marketing at the “Alpenarena”, a well-known tourist destination (Flims-Laax-Falera). In June 2004 she became head of the “Communication and Marketing” department at Schweizer Radio DRS. From January 2008 to May 2017 she held the position of CEO of Engadin St. Moritz Tourism.

Ehrat is currently devoting herself to tasks and projects that are shaped by visionary entrepreneurs. This includes engagements at Globalance Bank Zurich and Lenzerheide mountain railways.

She is on the board of directors of the planning and engineering company ewp Zurich.

Ehrat is a voluntary member of the Foundation Board of Denk an mich and the advisory board of the Swiss School of Tourism & Hospitality Graubünden.
