= Anja Zavadlav =

Slovenian alpine skier (born 1960)

Anja Zavadlav (born 11 May 1960) is a Slovenian former alpine skier who competed for Yugoslavia in the 1980 Winter Olympics and 1984 Winter Olympics.
