= Ivana Valešová =

Czech alpine skier (born 1963)

Ivana Valešová (born 29 November 1963 in Liberec) is a Czech former alpine skier who competed for Czechoslovakia in the 1984 Winter Olympics.
