= Veronika Stallmaier =

Austrian alpine skier (born 1964)

Medal record

Women's alpine skiing

Representing Austria

Olympic Games
Bronze medal – third place	1992 Albertville	Downhill

Veronika Stallmaier (née Wallinger; born 30 July 1964 in St. Kolomann) is a retired Austrian alpine skier.
