= Roswitha Steiner =

Austrian alpine skier

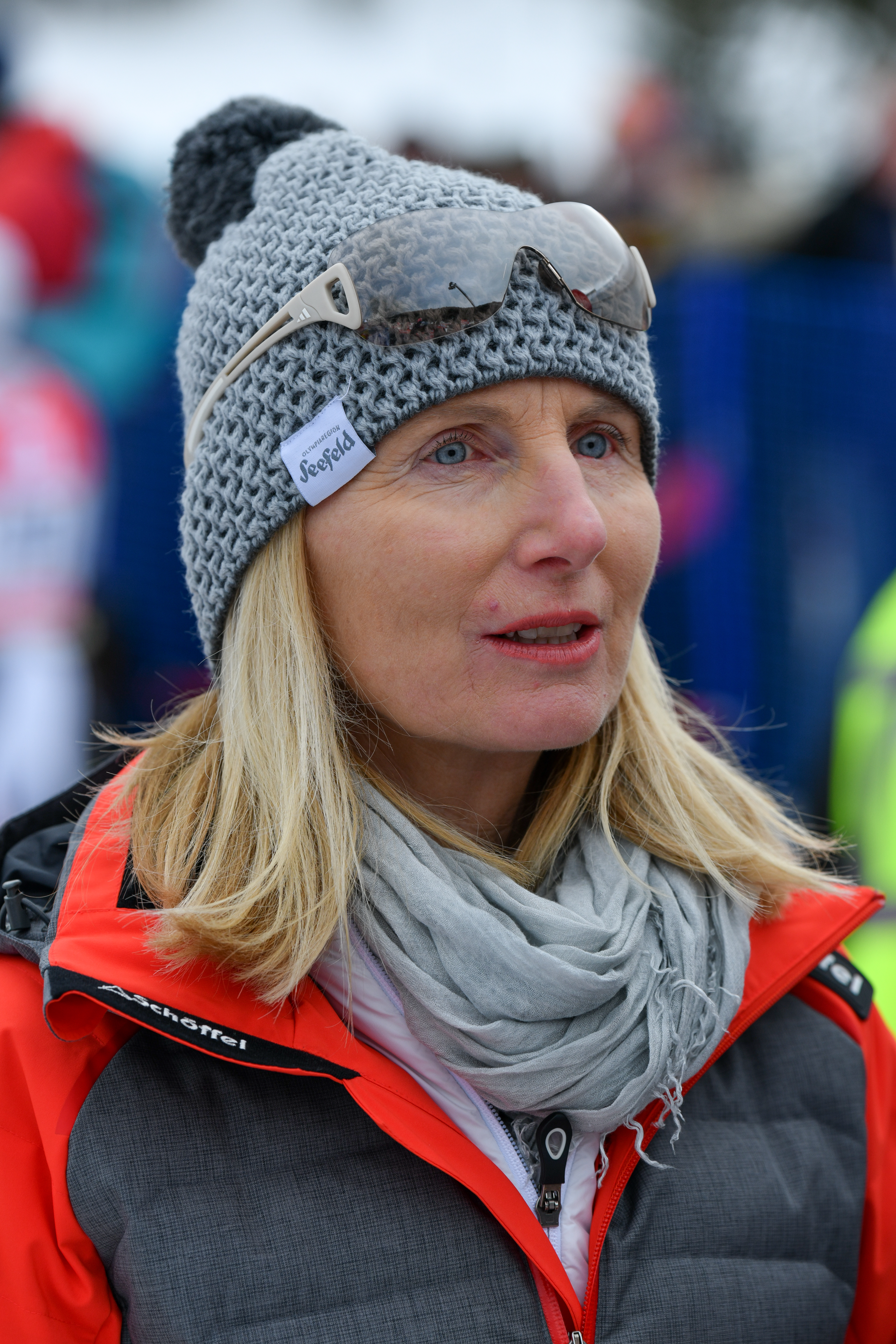

Medal record

Women's alpine skiing

Representing Austria

World Championships
Silver medal – second place	1987 Crans Montana	Slalom

Roswitha Stadlober (née Steiner; born 14 June 1963 in Radstadt, Salzburg) is an Austrian former alpine skier.

== Career ==
She concluded her career at the end of the 1987/1988 season by clinching her second Slalom World Cup title, also winning her last race in Aspen. She is married to Alois Stadlober, a former Austrian cross-country skier and world champion at the 1999 FIS Nordic World Ski Championships. Their son Luis Stadlober and daughter Teresa Stadlober are also competitive cross-country skiers. Roswitha has served as a member of the executive committee of the Austrian Ski Federation since 2011. In October 2021, she became the first female president of the Federation, after having served as senior vice-president.

== Achievements ==
1984 Winter Olympics in Sarajevo:

- fourth place at alpine skiing Slalom

1988 Winter Olympics in Calgary:

- fourth place at alpine skiing Slalom

Alpine skiing World Championship 1982 in Schladming:

- tenth at Giant slalom
- seventh at Slalom

Alpine skiing World Championship 1987 in Crans-Montana:

- Silver place at Slalom

1984 Austrian Alpine Ski Championships

- first place at Slalom skiing

8 World Cup race victories at Slalom

Two time Slalom World Cup winner 1985/86 and 1987/88 (There are statistics, that she would have shared first title with Erika Hess; she and Erika did gain 110 points, but Roswitha did achieve four victories, therefore she is the sole winner.)

Awards
Preceded by (Austria) Elisabeth Kirchler	Austrian Sportswoman of the year 1986	Succeeded by (Austria) Sigrid Wolf
