= Diana Haight =

Canadian alpine skier (born 1964)

Diana Haight (born 28 April 1964) is a Canadian former alpine skier who competed in the 1984 Winter Olympics.
