= Dorota Tlałka-Mogore =

Polish-French alpine skier (1963–2025)

Dorota Tlałka-Mogore (27 April 1963 – 26 September 2025) was a Polish and later French alpine skier who competed in the 1984 Winter Olympics and 1988 Winter Olympics. She was the twin sister of fellow alpine skier Małgorzata Tlałka-Mogore.

The twins were born in Zakopane into a winter sports family: their father, Jan, was a 16-time Polish speed skating champion, whilst their mother Włada was a cross-country skier. They both skied and skated during their childhood before they focused on skiing from the age of 12. Dorota took a fourth place in the slalom at the 1982 Alpine Skiing World Championships. In 1985 the twins decided to leave Poland as they were unhappy with the training opportunities in the country. They originally intended to study and train in France and continue to compete for Poland, however in October 1985 Dorota and Małgorzata married French brothers Christian and Christophe Mogore (the former a sports journalist, the latter a former racing cyclist) and the pair became French citizens in June 1986.

Tlałka-Mogore died on 26 September 2025, at the age of 62.
