= Malgorzata Tlalka =

Polish-French alpine skier (born 1963)

Małgorzata Tlałka
Personal information
- Born: 27 April 1963 (age 63) Zakopane, Poland

Skiing career
- Sport: Alpine skiing
- Retired: 1988
- Disciplines: Technical events
- World Cup debut: 1982

Olympics
- Teams: 2 (1 Poland, 1 France)

World Championships
- Teams: 3 (2 Poland, 1 France)

World Cup
- Seasons: 7
- Podiums: 8 (6 Poland, 2 France)
Medal record
Women's alpine skiing
Representing Poland
World Cup race podiums: Event / 1st / 2nd / 3rd; Slalom / 0 / 2 / 4
Winter Univerisde
| Silver medal – second place | 1985 Belluno | Combined |
| Bronze medal – third place | 1983 Sofia | Slalom |
| Bronze medal – third place | 1983 Sofia | Giant Slalom |
Representing France
World Cup race podiums: Event / 1st / 2nd / 3rd; Slalom / 0 / 1 / 1
Winter Univerisde
| Gold medal – first place | 1991 Sapporo | Combined |

Małgorzata Tlałka (born 27 April 1963) is a Polish-French former alpine skier.

From 1986 to 1991 she competed for France under the name of Malgorzata Tlalka-Mogore or Malgorzata Mogore-Tlalka.

== Career ==
She competed in the 1984 Winter Olympics and 1988 Winter Olympics. She is the twin sister of fellow alpine skier Dorota Tlałka-Mogore.

The twins were born into a winter sports family: their father, Jan, was a 16-time Polish speed skating champion, whilst their mother Władysława was a cross-country skier. They both skied and skated during their childhood before they focused on skiing from the age of 12. In 1985 the twins decided to leave Poland as they were unhappy with the training opportunities in the country. They originally intended to study and train in France and continue to compete for Poland, however in October 1985 Dorota and Małgorzata married French brothers Christian and Christophe Mogore (the former a sports journalist, the latter a former racing cyclist) and the pair became French citizens in June 1986. Małgorzata finished seventh in the giant slalom at the 1987 Alpine Skiing World Championships.

== Personal life ==
After the marriage of her twin sister Dorota to the Frenchman Christian Mogore, Malgorzata also contracted a marriage of convenience with Christian's younger brother to be able to stand next to her sister and compete for France.

After the end of her skiing career, Malgorzata ended her fictitious marriage by divorcing him, and today she lives in Poland near Zakopane with her husband Piotr Długosz, a Polish engineer. The couple had three children, Piotr, Dorota and Jan.
