= Jana Gantnerová-Šoltýsová =

Slovak alpine skier (born 1959)

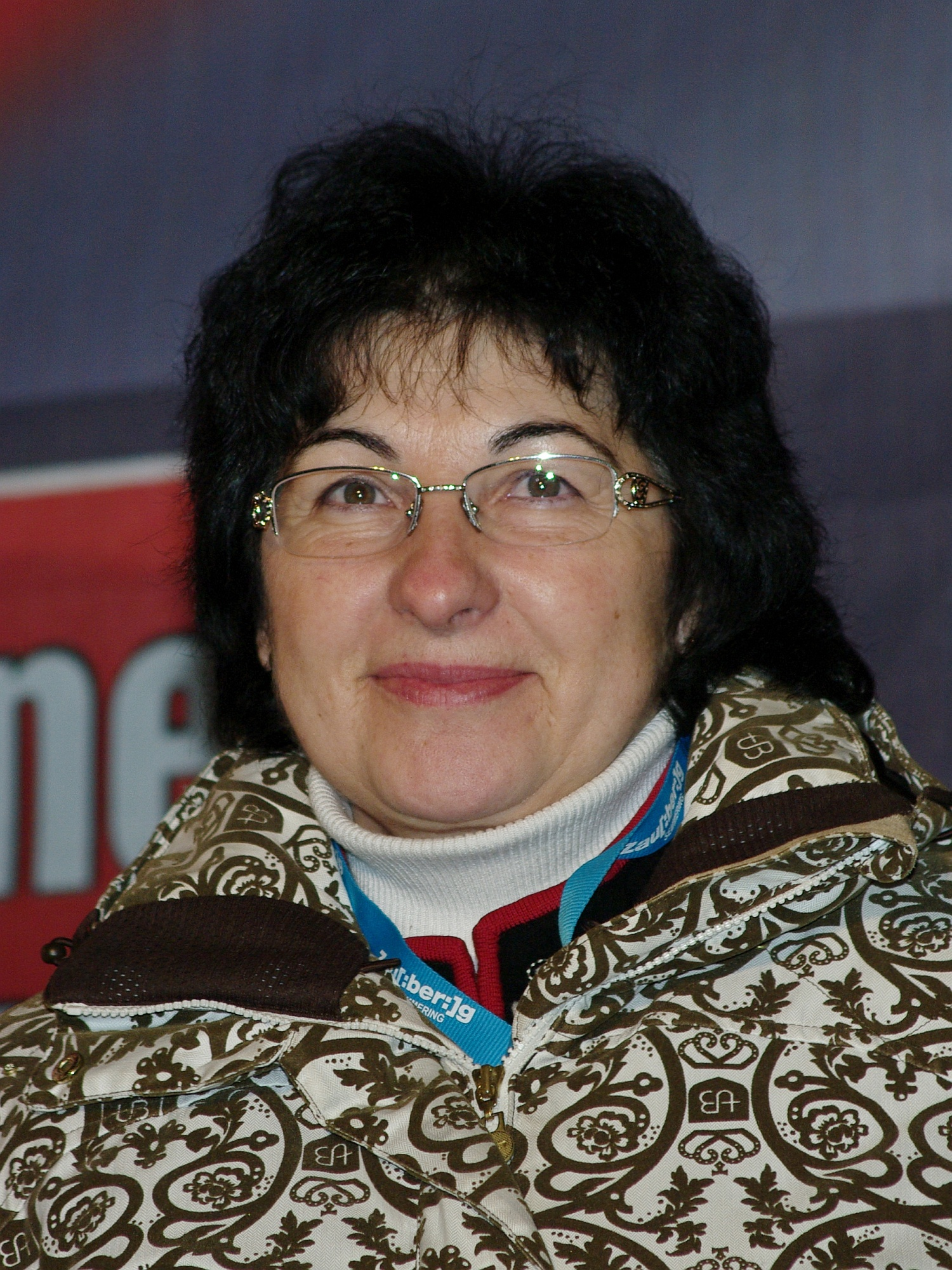
Jana Gantnerová-Šoltýsová in 2010

Jana Gantnerová-Šoltýsová (born 30 September 1959 in Kežmarok) is a Slovak former alpine skier who competed for Czechoslovakia in the 1976 Winter Olympics, 1980 Winter Olympics, and 1984 Winter Olympics. In December 1980, she won an Alpine Skiing World Cup downhill in Altenmarkt, becoming the first east European skier to win a World Cup race. Her best performance at the Olympics was a fifth place in the downhill in 1984. Since retiring from competition, she has served as president of the Slovak Skiing Association, as a member of the Slovak Olympic Committee Executive Board, as a member of the International Ski Federation Alpine Commission, and as Deputy Chef de Mission for the Slovak team at the 2010 Winter Olympics. She is the mother of alpine skier Jana Gantnerová.

== World Cup results ==
=== Race victories ===
- 1 win – (1 DH, 0 SG, 0 GS, 0 SL, 0 K)

Season	Date	Location	Discipline
1981	17 Dec 1980	Altenmarkt, Austria	Downhill
