= Brigitte Oertli =

Swiss alpine skier

Personal information
- Born: 10 June 1962 (age 64) Egg, Switzerland

Skiing career
- Sport: Alpine skiing
- Retired: 1990
- Disciplines: Polyvalent
- World Cup debut: 1982

Olympics
- Teams: 2
- Medals: 2

World Championships
- Teams: 3
- Medals: 1

World Cup
- Seasons: 9
- Wins: 9
- Podiums: 31
- Discipline titles: 4
Medal record
Women's alpine skiing
Representing Switzerland
World Cup race podiums
Event	1st	2nd	3rd
Slalom	1	3	3
Giant slalom	0	0	1
Downhill	1	8	2
Super-G	0	1	1
Combined	7	1	2
Total	9	13	9
International competitions
Event	1st	2nd	3rd
Olympic Games	0	2	0
World Championships	0	0	1
Total	0	2	1
Olympic Games
Junior World Championships
Bronze medal – third place	2012 Roccaraso	Super-G

Brigitte Oertli (born 10 June 1962) is a former Swiss alpine skier.

== Career ==
During her career she has achieved 31 results among the top 3 in the World Cup. In Alpine skiing at the 1988 Winter Olympics, Oertli won silver medals in Downhill and Alpine Combined.

== World Cup results ==
season	Overall		Downhill		Super G		Giant slalom		Slalom		Combined	
season	Place	Points	Place	Points	Place	Points	Place	Points	Place	Points	Place	Points
1981/82	59.	10	35.	2	–	–	–	–	32.	4	23.	4
1982/83	35.	38	26.	11	–	–	–	–	29.	5	11.	22
1983/84	16.	89	16.	23	–	–	26.	11	16.	34	13.	24
1984/85	2.	218	3.	76	–	–	17.	36	10.	58	1.	74
1985/86	5.	181	4.	82	–	–	35.	6	5.	52	4.	41
1986/87	3.	206	7.	33	4.	49	8.	42	5.	77	1.	25
1987/88	2.	226	2.	119	17.	12	27.	4	12.	41	1.	50
1988/89	19.	60	26.	9	22.	8	–	–	27.	7	1.	36
1989/90	40.	35	27.	5	–	–	–	–	28.	5	3.	25
