= Elisabeth Kirchler =

Austrian alpine skier (born 1963)

Personal information
- Born: 17 November 1963 (age 62) Schwaz, Tyrol, Austria
- Height: 1.68 m (5 ft 6 in)

Skiing career
- Sport: Alpine skiing
- Club: WSV Tux
- Disciplines: Speed events, giant slalom

World Cup
- Wins: 4
- Podiums: 13
Medal record
Women's alpine skiing
Representing Austria
World Cup race podiums
Event	1st	2nd	3rd
Giant slalom	0	1	0
Downhill	3	4	0
Super-G	0	2	0
Combined	1	1	1
Total	4	8	1
World Championships
Silver medal – second place	1985 Bormio	Giant slalom

Elisabeth Kirchler (born 17 November 1963) is a retired Austrian alpine skier.

== Biography ==
She did grow up in the small village Lanersbach, community Tux. Her nickname is Lis or Lisi. Winning the silver medal in the giant slalom Race in the World Championships 1985 (female races were held at Santa Caterina) was a great surprise because she was known as a "speed racer" (and by the way, female racers of the Austrian Ski Federation weren't successful in that discipline since March 1978). Besides her four wins, she could achieve podiums as following: Place 2: downhill 4, Super-G 2, giant slalom 1, Alpine Combined 1; place 3: Alpine Combined 1. - Another results are: Olympics: Downhill 9th, in 1984; Downhill 8th, Super-G 15th, in 1988. - World Championships: Downhill 6th, giant slalom 8th, in 1982; Downhill 12th, in 1985; Downhill 22nd, in 1989. - She was an Austrian Champion in the giant slalom in 1983.

After retirement she was a commentator for the Austrian Television broadcaster ORF and a columnist for an Austrian newspaper for several years. She is married to a restaurant proprietor (Armin Riml); the couple lives at Sölden with three children.

== World Cup victories ==
Date	Location	Race
6 March 1981	(United States) Aspen	Downhill
8 December 1982	(France) Val d'Isère	Combined
22 January 1983	(France) Megève	Downhill
21 December 1984	(Italy) Santa Caterina	Downhill

Awards
Preceded by (Austria) Edit Horvath	Austrian Sportswoman of the year 1985	Succeeded by (Austria) Roswitha Steiner
