= Sylvia Eder =

Austrian alpine skier

Personal information
- Born: 24 August 1965 (age 60) St. Johann in Tirol, Austria

Skiing career
- Sport: Alpine skiing
- Club: SC Leogang
- Disciplines: Speed events, giant slalom

World Cup
- Wins: 2
- Podiums: 11
Medal record
Women's alpine skiing
Representing Austria
World Cup race podiums
Event	1st	2nd	3rd
Giant slalom	0	0	1
Downhill	1	0	3
Super-G	1	1	3
Combined	0	1	0
Total	2	2	7
World Championships
Silver medal – second place	1985 Bormio	Combined
Silver medal – second place	1987 Crans-Montana	Combined
Silver medal – second place	1993 Morioka-Shizukuishi	Super-G

Sylvia Eder (born 24 August 1965) is a former Austrian alpine skier.

== Biography ==
Born in Leogang, she won her first downhill race at Bad Gastein, Austria in 1982 at the age of 17. The downhill remained her specialty discipline throughout her early career. She later developed an interest in the slalom, at which she won the world championship in 1985 in Bormio and the silver medal, after Erika Hess of Switzerland, at the World Cup in 1987.

Later Eder focused on the giant slalom and the super-G, the latter becoming her main discipline. In 1993 she won a silver medal at the Alpine World Ski Championships in Morioka. Nearly 13 years after her first World Cup victory, in December 1994 she once again celebrated a success, winning the super-G at Vail, Colorado before her team colleague Veronika Wallinger.

The alpine skier Elfi Eder is her younger sister.

== World Cup victories ==
Date	Location	Race
18 January 1982	(Austria) Bad Gastein	Downhill
4 December 1994	(United States) Vail	Super-G
