= Olga Charvátová =

Czech alpine skier (born 1962)

Medal record

Women's alpine skiing

Representing Czechoslovakia

Olympic Games
Bronze medal – third place	1984 Sarajevo	Downhill

Olga Charvátová (Czech pronunciation: [ˈolɡa ˈxarvaːtovaː], born 11 June 1962 in Gottwaldov, now Zlín), also known Olga Křížová, is a retired Czech alpine skier who represented Czechoslovakia. At the 1984 Winter Olympics in Sarajevo, Charvátová won a bronze medal in the downhill event.

== Individual victories ==
Date	Location	Race
21 January 1983	(Austria) Schruns	Combined
4 February 1986	(Italy) Piancavallo	Slalom
