= United States at the 2002 Winter Olympics =

- Flag of the United States
- IOC code: USA
- NOC: United States Olympic Committee

in Salt Lake City
- Competitors: 202 (115 men and 87 women) in 8 sports
- Flag bearers: Amy Peterson (opening); Brian Shimer (closing)
- Medals Ranked 3rd: Gold 10 Silver 13 Bronze 11 Total 34

Winter Olympics appearances (overview)
- 1924; 1928; 1932; 1936; 1948; 1952; 1956; 1960; 1964; 1968; 1972; 1976; 1980; 1984; 1988; 1992; 1994; 1998; 2002; 2006; 2010; 2014; 2018; 2022; 2026

The United States was the host nation for the 2002 Winter Olympics in Salt Lake City, Utah.

These Games were by far the best home Winter Games for the United States, earning 34 total medals, nearly triple their best previous hauls at the 1960 Winter Olympics in Squaw Valley, California, and the 1932 Winter Olympics and 1980 Winter Olympics, both in Lake Placid, New York, and the most a host country has won at a single Winter Olympics.

The United States also tied Norway at the 1994 Winter Olympics for most gold medals a host country has won at a Winter Olympics, with 10. Canada broke this record during the 2010 Winter Olympics.

The Olympics were held only months after September 11, 2001. During the opening ceremonies, Jacques Rogge, presiding over his first Olympics as IOC president, told the American athletes that the world was gathered in their country and that their country was overcoming the "horrific tragedy" of that day and stands united with them in promoting the IOC's ideals.

== Medalists ==
The following U.S. competitors won medals at the games. In the by discipline sections below, medalists' names are bolded.

Medal	Name	Sport	Event	Date
Gold	Kelly Clark	Snowboarding	Women's halfpipe	February 10
Gold	Ross Powers	Snowboarding	Men's halfpipe	February 11
Gold	Casey FitzRandolph	Speed skating	Men's 500 metres	February 12
Gold	Chris Witty	Speed skating	Women's 1000 metres	February 17
Gold	Jill Bakken; Vonetta Flowers	Bobsleigh	Two-woman	February 19
Gold	Derek Parra	Speed skating	Men's 1500 metres	February 19
Gold	Apolo Anton Ohno	Short track speed skating	Men's 1500 metres	February 20
Gold	Jimmy Shea	Skeleton	Men's	February 20
Gold	Tristan Gale	Skeleton	Women's	February 20
Gold	Sarah Hughes	Figure skating	Women's singles	February 21
Silver	Shannon Bahrke	Freestyle skiing	Women's moguls	February 9
Silver	Derek Parra	Speed skating	Men's 5000 metres	February 9
Silver	Danny Kass	Snowboarding	Men's halfpipe	February 11
Silver	Travis Mayer	Freestyle skiing	Men's moguls	February 12
Silver	Bode Miller	Alpine skiing	Men's combined	February 13
Silver	Mark Grimmette; Brian Martin	Luge	Doubles	February 15
Silver	Apolo Anton Ohno	Short track speed skating	Men's 1000 metres	February 16
Silver	Joe Pack	Freestyle skiing	Men's aerials	February 19
Silver	Lea Ann Parsley	Skeleton	Women's	February 20
Silver	Bode Miller	Alpine skiing	Men's giant slalom	February 21
Silver	United States women's national ice hockey team: Chris Bailey; Laurie Baker; Karyn Bye; Julie Chu; Natalie Darwitz; Sara Decosta; Tricia Dunn-Luoma; Cammi Granato; Courtney Kennedy; Andrea Kilbourne; Katie King; Shelley Looney; Sue Merz; Allison Mleczko; Tara Mounsey; Jenny Potter; Angela Ruggiero; Sarah Tueting; Lyndsay Wall; Krissy Wendell	Ice hockey	Women's tournament	February 21
Silver	Todd Hays; Garrett Hines; Randy Jones; Bill Schuffenhauer	Bobsleigh	Four-man	February 23
Silver	United States men's national ice hockey team: Tony Amonte; Tom Barrasso; Chris Chelios; Adam Deadmarsh; Chris Drury; Mike Dunham; Bill Guerin; Phil Housley; Brett Hull; John LeClair; Brian Leetch; Aaron Miller; Mike Modano; Tom Poti; Brian Rafalski; Mike Richter; Jeremy Roenick; Brian Rolston; Gary Suter; Keith Tkachuk; Doug Weight; Mike York; Scott Young	Ice hockey	Men's tournament	February 24
Bronze	Jarret Thomas	Snowboarding	Men's halfpipe	February 11
Bronze	Kip Carpenter	Speed skating	Men's 500 metres	February 12
Bronze	Timothy Goebel	Figure skating	Men's singles	February 14
Bronze	Clay Ives; Chris Thorpe	Luge	Doubles	February 15
Bronze	Chris Klug	Snowboarding	Men's parallel giant slalom	February 15
Bronze	Joey Cheek	Speed skating	Men's 1000 metres	February 16
Bronze	Jennifer Rodriguez	Speed skating	Women's 1000 metres	February 17
Bronze	Jennifer Rodriguez	Speed skating	Women's 1500 metres	February 20
Bronze	Michelle Kwan	Figure skating	Women's singles	February 21
Bronze	Mike Kohn; Doug Sharp; Brian Shimer; Dan Steele	Bobsleigh	Four-man	February 23
Bronze	Rusty Smith	Short track speed skating	Men's 500 metres	February 23

Medals by sport
Sport	1st place, gold medalist(s)	2nd place, silver medalist(s)	3rd place, bronze medalist(s)	Total
Speed skating	3	1	4	**8**
Snowboarding	2	1	2	**5**
Skeleton	2	1	0	**3**
Bobsleigh	1	1	1	**3**
Short track speed skating	1	1	1	**3**
Figure skating	1	0	2	**3**
Freestyle skiing	0	3	0	**3**
Alpine skiing	0	2	0	**2**
Ice hockey	0	2	0	**2**
Luge	0	1	1	**2**
Total	10	13	11	34

Medals by date
Day	Date	1st place, gold medalist(s)	2nd place, silver medalist(s)	3rd place, bronze medalist(s)	Total
1	February 9	0	2	0	**2**
2	February 10	1	0	0	**1**
3	February 11	1	1	1	**3**
4	February 12	1	1	1	**3**
5	February 13	0	1	0	**1**
6	February 14	0	0	1	**1**
7	February 15	0	1	2	**3**
8	February 16	0	1	1	**2**
9	February 17	1	0	1	**2**
11	February 19	2	1	0	**3**
12	February 20	3	1	1	**5**
13	February 21	1	2	1	**4**
15	February 23	0	1	2	**3**
16	February 24	0	1	0	**1**
Total		10	13	11	34

Medals by gender
Gender	1st place, gold medalist(s)	2nd place, silver medalist(s)	3rd place, bronze medalist(s)	Total	Percentage
Male	5	10	8	**23**	67.6%
Female	5	3	3	**11**	32.4%
Total	10	13	11	34	100%

Multiple medalists
Name	Sport	1st place, gold medalist(s)	2nd place, silver medalist(s)	3rd place, bronze medalist(s)	Total
Apolo Anton Ohno	Short track speed skating	1	1	0	**2**
Derek Parra	Speed skating	1	1	0	**2**
Bode Miller	Alpine skiing	0	2	0	**2**
Jennifer Rodriguez	Short track speed skating	0	0	2	**2**

== Alpine skiing ==
Men

Athlete	Event	Run 1		Run 2		Run 3		Total	
Athlete	Event	Time	Rank	Time	Rank	Time	Rank	Time	Rank
Jakub Fiala	Downhill	—N/a						1:41.84	27
Scott Macartney	Downhill	—N/a						1:41.86	29
Daron Rahlves	Downhill	—N/a						1:40.84	16
Marco Sullivan	Downhill	—N/a						1:40.37	9
Jakub Fiala	Combined	1:41.85	21	51.24	19	57.34	21	3:30.43	19
Bode Miller	Combined	1:41.23	15	46.88	5	49.73	1	3:17.84	2nd place, silver medalist(s)
Scott Macartney	Super-G	—N/a						1:25.80	25
Daron Rahlves	Super-G	—N/a						1:22.48	8
Marco Sullivan	Super-G	—N/a						DNF	
Thomas Vonn	Super-G	—N/a						1:23.22	9
Bode Miller	Giant slalom	1:12.89	7	1:11.27	1	—N/a		2:24.16	2nd place, silver medalist(s)
Dane Spencer	Giant slalom	1:14.03	21	1:11.65	9	—N/a		2:25.68	16
Thomas Vonn	Giant slalom	1:14.59	28	1:11.87	13	—N/a		2:26.46	19
Chip Knight	Slalom	50.85	16	54.01	13	—N/a		1:44.86	11
Erik Schlopy	Slalom	51.27	21	53.94	11	—N/a		1:45.21	13
Bode Miller	Slalom	48.37	2	64.42	31	—N/a		1:52.79	24
Tom Rothrock	Slalom	50.61	14	DNF		—N/a		DNF	

Women

Athlete	Event	Run 1		Run 2		Run 3		Total	
Athlete	Event	Time	Rank	Time	Rank	Time	Rank	Time	Rank
Kirsten Clark	Downhill	—N/a						1:41.03	12
Caroline Lalive	Downhill	—N/a						DNF	
Jonna Mendes	Downhill	—N/a						1:40.97	11
Picabo Street	Downhill	—N/a						1:41.17	16
Caroline Lalive	Combined	1:02.45	28	DNF					
Lindsey C. Kildow	Combined	45.95	6	45.49	16	1:16.61	4	2:48.05	6
Julia Mancuso	Combined	47.66	16	46.07	19	1:17.60	13	2:51.33	13
Kirsten Clark	Super-G	—N/a						1:15.13	14
Caroline Lalive	Super-G	—N/a						DNF	
Jonna Mendes	Super-G	—N/a						1:15.25	16
Katie Monahan	Super-G	—N/a						1:15.59	17
Kirsten Clark	Giant slalom	1:18.38	21	1:18.04	28	—N/a		2:36.42	26
Kristina Koznick	Giant slalom	1:18.04	19	1:16.18	16	—N/a		2:34.22	17
Sarah Schleper	Giant slalom	1:18.61	23	1:17.35	22	—N/a		2:35.96	21
Alex Shaffer	Giant slalom	1:19.38	33	1:18.00	27	—N/a		2:37.38	28
Kristina Koznick	Slalom	DNF				—N/a		DNF	
Lindsey C. Kildow	Slalom	56.84	30	63.89	33	—N/a		2:00.73	32
Tasha Nelson	Slalom	DNF				—N/a		DNF	
Sarah Schleper	Slalom	DNF				—N/a		DNF	

== Biathlon ==
Men

Athlete	Event	Time	Misses	Rank
Jay Hakkinen	Sprint	26:43.5	1	26
Lawton Redman	Sprint	27:43.4	2	54
Jeremy Teela	Sprint	26:36.6	2	20
Jay Hakkinen	Pursuit	34:11.8	1	13
Lawton Redman	Pursuit	38:59.0	6	52
Jeremy Teela	Pursuit	35:18.1	3	23
Dan Campbell	Individual	1:00:58.6	6	76
Jay Hakkinen	Individual	55:13.8	3	26
Jeremy Teela	Individual	53:56.5	2	14
Dan Campbell; Jay Hakkinen; Lawton Redman; Jeremy Teela	Relay	1:30:27.1	18	15

Women

Athlete	Event	Time	Misses	Rank
Andrea Nahrgang	Sprint	23:48.7	1	50
Kara Salmela	Sprint	23:44.1	3	49
Rachel Steer	Sprint	24:41.7	3	60
Andrea Nahrgang	Pursuit	38:08.5	3	47
Kara Salmela	Pursuit	37:07.7	5	45
Rachel Steer	Pursuit	Lapped		
Kristina Sabasteanski	Individual	55:00.9	4	55
Kara Salmela	Individual	57:25.9	8	59
Rachel Steer	Individual	51:50.6	2	31
Andrea Nahrgang; Kristina Sabasteanski; Kara Salmela; Rachel Steer	Relay	1:41:16.0	16	16

== Bobsleigh ==
Men

Athlete	Event	Run 1		Run 2		Run 3		Run 4		Total	
Athlete	Event	Time	Rank	Time	Rank	Time	Rank	Time	Rank	Time	Rank
Todd Hays; Garrett Hines	Two-man	47.71	5	47.70	5	47.61	3	47.63	2	3:10.65	4
Brian Shimer; Darrin Steele	Two-man	47.92	9	47.99	9	48.07	11	47.95	8	3:11.93	9
Todd Hays; Randy Jones; Bill Schuffenhauer; Garrett Hines	Four-man	46.65	1	46.61	1	47.22	4	47.33	3	3:07.81	2nd place, silver medalist(s)
Brian Shimer; Mike Kohn; Doug Sharp; Dan Steele	Four-man	46.83	5	46.82	5	46.98	2	47.23	1	3:07.86	3rd place, bronze medalist(s)

Women

Athlete	Event	Run 1		Run 2		Run 3		Run 4		Total	
Athlete	Event	Time	Rank	Time	Rank	Time	Rank	Time	Rank	Time	Rank
Jill Bakken; Vonetta Flowers	Two-woman	48.81	1	48.95	1	—N/a				1:37.76	1st place, gold medalist(s)
Jean Racine-Prahm; Gea Johnson	Two-woman	49.31	5	49.42	5	—N/a				1:38.73	5

== Cross-country skiing ==
Distance
Men

Athlete	Event	Time	Rank
John Bauer	15 km classical	38:55.7	12
Lars Flora	15 km classical	42:11.5	54
Kris Freeman	15 km classical	39:34.3	22
Patrick Weaver	15 km classical	39:24.4	16
John Bauer	2 × 10 km pursuit	59:43.1	19
Kris Freeman	2 × 10 km pursuit	51:22.3	14
Justin Wadsworth	2 × 10 km pursuit	54:45.7	42
Patrick Weaver	2 × 10 km pursuit	54:10.5	45
Lars Flora	30 km freestyle	1:20:42.7	54
Andrew Johnson	30 km freestyle	1:14:26.9	21
Carl Swenson	30 km freestyle	1:21:17.3	56
Justin Wadsworth	30 km freestyle	DNF	
Andrew Johnson	50 km classical	2:32:44.3	51
Justin Wadsworth	50 km classical	DNF	
John Bauer; Luke Bodensteiner; Kris Freeman; Justin Wadsworth	4 × 10 km relay	1:34:05.5	5

Women

Athlete	Event	Time	Rank
Tessa Benoit	10 km classical	33:09.1	52
Nina Kemppel	10 km classical	30:51.9	38
Aelin Peterson	10 km classical	33:18.9	53
Wendy Wagner	10 km classical	30:50.7	36
Nina Kemppel	2 × 5 km pursuit	27:27.7	30
Aelin Peterson	2 × 5 km pursuit	DNF	
Kikkan Randall	2 × 5 km pursuit	DNF	
Wendy Wagner	2 × 5 km pursuit	28:38.0	48
Kristina Joder	15 km freestyle	48:06.0	53
Barb Jones	15 km freestyle	45:04.3	43
Nina Kemppel	15 km freestyle	42:53.1	29
Barb Jones	30 km classical	1:45:18.7	35
Nina Kemppel	30 km classical	1:37:08.7	15
Wendy Wagner	30 km classical	1:36:54.8	23
Barb Jones; Nina Kemppel; Aelin Peterson; Wendy Wagner	4 × 5 km relay	53:23.4	13

Sprint
Men

Athlete	Event	Qualifying		Quarterfinal		Semifinal		Final	
Athlete	Event	Time	Rank	Time	Rank	Time	Rank	Time	Rank
Lars Flora	Sprint	3:01.41	37	Did not advance					
Kris Freeman	Sprint	3:02.68	42	Did not advance					
Torin Koos	Sprint	3:01.32	36	Did not advance					
Carl Swenson	Sprint	2:58.56	30	Did not advance					

Women

Athlete	Event	Qualifying		Quarterfinal		Semifinal		Final	
Athlete	Event	Time	Rank	Time	Rank	Time	Rank	Time	Rank
Tessa Benoit	Sprint	3:28.35	38	Did not advance					
Kristina Joder	Sprint	3:34.18	48	Did not advance					
Aelin Peterson	Sprint	3:34.05	46	Did not advance					
Kikkan Randall	Sprint	3:30.27	44	Did not advance					

== Curling ==
Summary

Team	Event	Round-robin										Tiebreaker	Semifinal	Final / BM	
Team	Event	Opposition Score	Opposition Score	Opposition Score	Opposition Score	Opposition Score	Opposition Score	Opposition Score	Opposition Score	Opposition Score	Rank	Opposition Score	Opposition Score	Opposition Score	Rank
Tim Somerville; Donald Barcombe, Jr. Myles Brundidge; John Gordan; Mike Schneeberger	Men's tournament	SWE; W 10–5	CAN; L 3–8	GER; L 8–9	NOR; L 5–6	SUI; W 6–2	FRA; W 8–3	DEN; L 7–9	FIN; L 4–6	GBR; L 6–7	9	—N/a	Did not advance		
Kari Erickson; Joni Cotten; Stacey Liapis; Debbie McCormick; Ann Swisshelm	Women's tournament	JPN; W 8–7	SWE; W 6–5	CAN; L 4–6	DEN; L 4–9	SUI; L 6–7	RUS; W 11–4	GER; W 7–6	GBR; W 6–5	NOR; W 11–2	3 Q	Bye	SUI; L 4–9	Bronze medal match CAN; L 5–9	4

=== Men's tournament ===
Team Superior CC, Superior
Skip: Tim Somerville
Third: Mike Schneeberger
Second: Myles Brundidge
Lead: John Gordon
Alternate: Donald Barcombe, Jr.

Round robin
Top four teams advanced to semi-finals.

Country	Skip	W	L
Canada	Kevin Martin	8	1
Norway	Pål Trulsen	7	2
Switzerland	Andreas Schwaller	6	3
Sweden	Peja Lindholm	6	3
Finland	Markku Uusipaavalniemi	5	4
Germany	Sebastian Stock	4	5
Denmark	Ulrik Schmidt	3	6
(United Kingdom) Great Britain	Hammy McMillan	3	6
United States	Tim Somerville	3	6
France	Dominique Dupont-Roc	0	9

Draw 1
February 11, 9:00

Sheet C	1	2	3	4	5	6	7	8	9	10	Final
United States (Somerville)	2	1	0	0	1	0	4	0	2	X	10
Sweden (Lindholm)	0	0	1	1	0	1	0	2	0	X	5

Draw 4
February 13, 9:00

Sheet C	1	2	3	4	5	6	7	8	9	10	11	Final
Germany (Stock)	2	0	0	2	0	2	0	1	0	1	1	9
United States (Somerville)	0	0	2	0	1	0	3	0	2	0	0	8

Draw 6
February 14, 14:00

Sheet B	1	2	3	4	5	6	7	8	9	10	Final
Switzerland (Schwaller)	0	0	0	0	0	1	0	1	0	X	2
United States (Somerville)	0	0	0	2	2	0	1	0	1	X	6

Draw 9
February 16, 14:00

Sheet C	1	2	3	4	5	6	7	8	9	10	11	Final
United States (Somerville)	0	2	0	2	0	1	0	1	0	1	0	7
Denmark (Schmidt)	2	0	1	0	1	0	2	0	1	0	2	9

Draw 12
February 18, 14:00

Sheet C	1	2	3	4	5	6	7	8	9	10	Final
Great Britain (Smith)	0	2	2	0	1	0	0	1	0	1	7
United States (Somerville)	1	0	0	1	0	1	1	0	2	0	6

Draw 2
February 11, 19:00

Sheet B	1	2	3	4	5	6	7	8	9	10	Final
United States (Somerville)	0	1	0	0	0	0	2	0	0	X	3
Canada (Martin)	1	0	3	0	1	1	0	1	1	X	8

Draw 5
February 13, 19:00

Sheet D	1	2	3	4	5	6	7	8	9	10	Final
Norway (Trulsen)	1	0	0	1	1	0	1	0	0	2	6
United States (Somerville)	0	1	1	0	0	1	0	1	1	0	5

Draw 7
February 15, 9:00

Sheet A	1	2	3	4	5	6	7	8	9	10	Final
France (Dupont-Roc)	1	0	0	1	0	0	0	1	0	X	3
United States (Somerville)	0	0	2	0	0	2	1	0	3	X	8

Draw 11
February 17, 19:00

Sheet D	1	2	3	4	5	6	7	8	9	10	Final
United States (Somerville)	0	1	0	1	0	0	0	1	1	0	4
Finland (Uusipaavalniemi)	0	0	2	0	1	1	1	0	0	1	6

=== Women's tournament ===
Team
Bemidji CC, Bemidji
Skip: Kari Erickson
Third: Debbie McCormick
Second: Stacey Liapis
Lead: Ann Swisshelm
Alternate: Joni Cotten

Round robin
Top four teams advanced to semi-finals.

Country	Skip	W	L
Canada	Kelley Law	8	1
Switzerland	Luzia Ebnöther	7	2
United States	Kari Erickson	6	3
(United Kingdom) Great Britain	Rhona Martin	5	4
Germany	Natalie Neßler	5	4
Sweden	Elisabet Gustafson	5	4
Norway	Dordi Nordby	4	5
Japan	Akiko Katoh	2	7
Denmark	Lene Bidstrup	2	7
Russia	Olga Jarkova	1	8

Draw 2
February 12, 9:00

Sheet A	1	2	3	4	5	6	7	8	9	10	Final
Japan (Katoh)	0	1	0	2	3	0	0	0	1	0	7
United States (Erickson)	0	0	1	0	0	3	1	1	0	2	8

Draw 4
February 13, 14:00

Sheet A	1	2	3	4	5	6	7	8	9	10	Final
United States (Erickson)	0	0	0	1	0	1	1	1	0	0	4
Canada (Law)	1	1	0	0	2	0	0	0	0	2	6

Draw 6
February 14, 19:00

Sheet B	1	2	3	4	5	6	7	8	9	10	Final
United States (Erickson)	0	1	0	1	0	0	2	1	1	0	6
Switzerland (Ebnöther)	1	0	2	0	1	1	0	0	0	2	7

Draw 9
February 16, 19:00

Sheet A	1	2	3	4	5	6	7	8	9	10	Final
United States (Erickson)	0	1	0	1	0	2	0	0	2	1	7
Germany (Neßler)	1	0	0	0	1	0	3	1	0	0	6

Draw 11
February 18, 9:00

Sheet C	1	2	3	4	5	6	7	8	9	10	Final
Norway (Nordby)	1	0	0	0	1	0	0	X	X	X	2
United States (Erickson)	0	2	1	3	0	4	1	X	X	X	11

Draw 3
February 12, 19:00

Sheet B	1	2	3	4	5	6	7	8	9	10	Final
Sweden (Gustafson)	0	1	0	1	0	0	2	0	1	0	5
United States (Erickson)	1	0	2	0	1	1	0	0	0	1	6

Draw 5
February 14, 9:00

Sheet C	1	2	3	4	5	6	7	8	9	10	Final
Denmark (Bustrup)	1	0	0	2	0	2	0	1	2	1	9
United States (Erickson)	0	0	1	0	2	0	1	0	0	0	4

Draw 8
February 16, 9:00

Sheet B	1	2	3	4	5	6	7	8	9	10	Final
Russia (Jarkova)	0	0	0	1	0	1	0	1	0	1	4
United States (Erickson)	2	1	0	0	4	0	1	0	3	0	11

Draw 10
February 17, 14:00

Sheet D	1	2	3	4	5	6	7	8	9	10	11	Final
Great Britain (Martin)	1	0	0	1	0	2	0	0	1	0	0	5
United States (Erickson)	0	1	0	0	1	0	1	0	0	2	1	6

Semifinal
February 20, 9:00

Sheet B	1	2	3	4	5	6	7	8	9	10	Final
Switzerland (Ebnöther)	0	2	1	0	0	1	2	0	3	X	9
United States (Erickson)	1	0	0	1	1	0	0	1	0	X	4

Player Percentages
Switzerland		United States	
Laurence Bidaud	79%	Ann Swisshelm	71%
Tanya Frei	68%	Stacey Liapis	71%
Mirjam Ott	78%	Debbie McCormick	69%
Luzia Ebnöther	78%	Kari Erickson	53%
Total	76%	Total	66%

Bronze Medal Game
February 21, 9:00

Sheet C	1	2	3	4	5	6	7	8	9	10	Final
United States (Erickson)	0	1	1	0	0	1	0	2	0	0	5
Canada (Law)	2	0	0	2	1	0	2	0	1	1	9

Player Percentages
United States		Canada	
Ann Swisshelm	83%	Diane Nelson	84%
Stacey Liapis	80%	Georgina Wheatcroft	85%
Debbie McCormick	76%	Julie Skinner	74%
Kari Erickson	56%	Kelley Law	63%
Total	75%	Total	76%

== Figure skating ==
Individual

Athlete	Event	SP	FS	Total	
Athlete	Event	Rank	Rank	TFP	Rank
Todd Eldredge	Men's singles	9 Q	6	10.5	6
Timothy Goebel	Men's singles	3 Q	3	4.5	3rd place, bronze medalist(s)
Michael Weiss	Men's singles	8 Q	7	11.0	7
Sasha Cohen	Ladies' singles	3 Q	4	5.5	4
Sarah Hughes	Ladies' singles	4 Q	1	3.0	1st place, gold medalist(s)
Michelle Kwan	Ladies' singles	1 Q	3	3.5	3rd place, bronze medalist(s)

Mixed

Athlete	Event	CD1	CD2	SP / OD	FS / FD	Total	
Athlete	Event	Rank	Rank	Rank	Rank	TFP	Rank
Kyoko Ina; John Zimmerman	Pairs	—N/a		5	5	7.5	5
Tiffany Scott; Philip Dulebohn	Pairs	—N/a		11	13	18.5	13
Naomi Lang; Peter Tchernyshev	Ice dancing	12	11	11	11	22.2	11
Beata Handra; Charles Sinek	Ice dancing	20	20	22	23	44.2	23

== Freestyle skiing ==
Men

Athlete	Event	Qualifying		Final	
Athlete	Event	Points	Rank	Points	Rank
Eric Bergoust	Aerials	244.30	2 Q	218.49	12
Brian Currutt	Aerials	226.01	10 Q	245.19	6
Joe Pack	Aerials	243.26	3 Q	251.64	2nd place, silver medalist(s)
Jeret Peterson	Aerials	237.39	7 Q	238.05	9
Jeremy Bloom	Moguls	25.98	4 Q	26.19	9
Evan Dybvig	Moguls	9.96	28	Did not advance	
Travis Mayer	Moguls	27.05	1 Q	27.59	2nd place, silver medalist(s)
Jonny Moseley	Moguls	25.13	11 Q	26.78	4

Women

Athlete	Event	Qualifying		Final	
Athlete	Event	Points	Rank	Points	Rank
Tracy Evans	Aerials	152.07	14	Did not advance	
Brenda Petzold	Aerials	137.80	17	Did not advance	
Shannon Bahrke	Moguls	23.74	5 Q	25.06	2nd place, silver medalist(s)
Ann Battelle	Moguls	24.10	2 Q	24.62	7
Hannah Hardaway	Moguls	23.84	3 Q	24.77	5
Jillian Vogtli	Moguls	22.16	18	Did not advance	

== Ice hockey ==
Summary

Team	Event	Preliminary round				First round				Quarterfinal	Semifinal	Final / BM	
Team	Event	Opposition Score	Opposition Score	Opposition Score	Rank	Opposition Score	Opposition Score	Opposition Score	Rank	Opposition Score	Opposition Score	Opposition Score	Rank
United States men's	Men's tournament	Bye				Finland; W 6–0	Russia; T 2–2	Belarus; W 8–1	1 Q	Germany; W 5–0	Russia; W 3–2	Canada; L 2–5	2nd place, silver medalist(s)
United States women's	Women's tournament	Germany; W 10–0	China; W 12–1	Finland; W 5–0	1 Q	—N/a					Sweden; W 4–0	Canada; L 2–3	2nd place, silver medalist(s)

=== Men's tournament ===
Roster
Head coach: Herb Brooks

Assistant coach: John Cunniff, Lou Vairo

No.	Pos.	Name	Height	Weight	Birthdate	Team
1	G	Mike Dunham	6 ft 2 in (188 cm)	201 lb (91 kg)	June 1, 1972 (aged 29)	(United States) Nashville Predators
2	D	Brian Leetch (A)	6 ft 1 in (185 cm)	187 lb (85 kg)	March 3, 1968 (aged 33)	(United States) New York Rangers
33	D	Aaron Miller	6 ft 3 in (191 cm)	209 lb (95 kg)	August 11, 1971 (aged 30)	(United States) Los Angeles Kings
5	D	Tom Poti	6 ft 3 in (191 cm)	209 lb (95 kg)	March 22, 1977 (aged 24)	(Canada) Edmonton Oilers
6	D	Phil Housley (A)	5 ft 10 in (178 cm)	179 lb (81 kg)	March 9, 1964 (aged 37)	(United States) Chicago Blackhawks
7	F	Keith Tkachuk	6 ft 2 in (188 cm)	235 lb (107 kg)	March 28, 1972 (aged 29)	(United States) St. Louis Blues
9	F	Mike Modano	6 ft 3 in (191 cm)	210 lb (95 kg)	June 7, 1970 (aged 31)	(United States) Dallas Stars
10	F	John LeClair	6 ft 3 in (191 cm)	225 lb (102 kg)	July 5, 1969 (aged 32)	(United States) Philadelphia Flyers
11	F	Tony Amonte	6 ft 0 in (183 cm)	202 lb (92 kg)	August 2, 1970 (aged 31)	(United States) Chicago Blackhawks
12	F	Brian Rolston	6 ft 2 in (188 cm)	214 lb (97 kg)	February 21, 1973 (aged 28)	(United States) Boston Bruins
13	F	Bill Guerin	6 ft 2 in (188 cm)	220 lb (100 kg)	November 9, 1970 (aged 31)	(United States) Boston Bruins
16	F	Brett Hull	5 ft 11 in (180 cm)	201 lb (91 kg)	August 9, 1964 (aged 37)	(United States) Detroit Red Wings
18	F	Adam Deadmarsh	6 ft 0 in (183 cm)	205 lb (93 kg)	May 10, 1975 (aged 26)	(United States) Los Angeles Kings
20	D	Gary Suter	6 ft 0 in (183 cm)	205 lb (93 kg)	June 24, 1964 (aged 37)	(United States) San Jose Sharks
24	D	Chris Chelios (C)	5 ft 11 in (180 cm)	191 lb (87 kg)	January 25, 1962 (aged 40)	(United States) Detroit Red Wings
3	D	Brian Rafalski	5 ft 10 in (178 cm)	192 lb (87 kg)	September 28, 1973 (aged 28)	(United States) New Jersey Devils
30	G	Tom Barrasso	6 ft 3 in (191 cm)	209 lb (95 kg)	March 31, 1965 (aged 36)	(United States) Carolina Hurricanes
35	G	Mike Richter	5 ft 11 in (180 cm)	185 lb (84 kg)	September 22, 1966 (aged 35)	(United States) New York Rangers
37	F	Chris Drury	5 ft 10 in (178 cm)	190 lb (86 kg)	August 20, 1976 (aged 25)	(United States) Colorado Avalanche
39	F	Doug Weight	5 ft 11 in (180 cm)	196 lb (89 kg)	January 21, 1971 (aged 31)	(United States) St. Louis Blues
48	F	Scott Young	6 ft 1 in (185 cm)	201 lb (91 kg)	October 1, 1967 (aged 34)	(United States) St. Louis Blues
61	F	Mike York	5 ft 10 in (178 cm)	183 lb (83 kg)	January 3, 1978 (aged 24)	(United States) New York Rangers
97	F	Jeremy Roenick	6 ft 1 in (185 cm)	205 lb (93 kg)	January 17, 1970 (aged 32)	(United States) Philadelphia Flyers

First round

Pos	Team	Pld	W	D	L	GF	GA	GD	Pts	Qualification
1	United States (H)	3	2	1	0	16	3	+13	5	Quarterfinals
2	Finland	3	2	0	1	11	8	+3	4	Quarterfinals
3	Russia	3	1	1	1	9	9	0	3	Quarterfinals
4	Belarus	3	0	0	3	6	22	−16	0	Quarterfinals

Source: IIHF
(H) Hosts

All times are local (UTC-7).

15 February 2002; 20:45	Finland	0–6 (0–0, 0–3, 0–3)	United States	E Center, West Valley City; Attendance: 8,597

Game reference

Jani Hurme
Goalies
Mike Dunham
Referee:
(Canada) Bill McCreary
Linesmen:
(Canada) Derek Nansen
(United States) Tim Nowak

0–1	29:45 − S. Young (B. Rolston, G. Suter)
0–2	36:16 − J. LeClair (B. Hull)
0–3	37:45 − K. Tkachuk (J. Roenick, B. Leetch)
0–4	46:49 − J. LeClair (B. Leetch) (PP2)
0–5	51:23 − J. LeClair (B. Hull, D. Weight)
0–6	54:14 − B. Guerin (P. Housley)

10 min
Penalties
10 min
23
Shots
39

16 February 2002; 21:30	United States	2–2 (0–0, 1–1, 1–1)	Russia	E Center, West Valley City; Attendance: 8,599

Game reference

Mike Richter
Goalies
Nikolai Khabibulin
Referee:
(Canada) Bill McCreary
Linesmen:
(Czech Republic) Petr Blümel
(Canada) Jean Morin

K. Tkachuk (B. Leetch, B. Rafalski) (PP2) – 26:19	1–0
	1–1	37:08 – V. Bure (V. Malakhov) (PP)
	1–2	42:06 – S. Fedorov (I. Kovalchuk, S. Samsonov) (PP)
B. Hull (P. Housley, M. Modano) – 55:30	2–2

10 min
Penalties
8 min
25
Shots
35

18 February 2002; 11:05	Belarus	1–8 (1–0, 0–3, 0–5)	United States	E Center, West Valley City; Attendance: 8,599

Game reference

Andrei Mezin
Goalies
Tom Barrasso
Referee:
(Canada) Stephen Walkom
Linesmen:
(Canada) Mike Cvik
(Canada) Derek Nansen

D. Pankov (V. Tsyplakov, O. Khmyl) – 0:20	1–0
	1–1	20:46 – B. Hull (M. Modano)
	1–2	22:46 – J. LeClair (B. Hull, B. Leetch) (PP)
	1–3	27:33 – J. LeClair (M. Modano, B. Hull)
	1–4	44:28 – S. Young (M. York, J. Roenick)
	1–5	50:45 – A. Deadmarsh (B. Rolston) (SH)
	1–6	52:34 – S. Young (J. Roenick)
	1–7	53:32 – B. Guerin (T. Amonte)
	1–8	56:26 – B. Guerin (A. Deadmarsh, B. Rolston)

8 min
Penalties
8 min
13
Shots
48

Quarterfinal

20 February 2002; 16:00	United States	5–0 (1–0, 4–0, 0–0)	Germany	E Center, West Valley City; Attendance: 8,599

Game reference

Mike Richter
Goalies
Marc Seliger
Robert Müller
Referee:
(Sweden) Ulf Rådbjer
Linesmen:
(Canada) Jean Morin
(Canada) Derek Nansen

J. Roenick (B. Rafalski, D. Weight) (PP2) – 13:06	1–0
C. Chelios – 20:46	2–0
T. Amonte (J. Roenick) – 29:42	3–0
J. LeClair (P. Housley, M. Modano) – 30:14	4–0
B. Hull (M. Modano, J. LeClair) – 31:47	5–0

4 min
Penalties
33 min
33
Shots
28

Semifinal

22 February 2002; 16:20	Russia	2–3 (0–1, 0–2, 2–0)	United States	E Center, West Valley City; Attendance: 8,599

Game reference

Nikolai Khabibulin
Goalies
Mike Richter
Referee:
(Canada) Bill McCreary
Linesmen:
(Finland) Antti Hämäläinen
(Canada) Jean Morin

	0–1	15:56 – B. Guerin (PP)
	0–2	27:31 – S. Young (P. Housley, B. Leetch) (PP)
	0–3	37:39 – P. Housley (T. Amonte) (PP)
A. Kovalev (D. Markov, O. Tverdovsky) – 40:11	1–3
V. Malakhov – 43:21	2–3

12 min
Penalties
8 min
30
Shots
49

Gold medal game

24 February 2002; 13:00	United States	2–5 (1–2, 1–1, 0–2)	Canada	E Center, West Valley City; Attendance: 8,599

Game reference

Mike Richter
Goalies
Martin Brodeur
Referee:
(Canada) Bill McCreary
Linesmen:
(Canada) Mike Cvik
(Finland) Antti Hämäläinen

T. Amonte (D. Weight, T. Poti) – 8:49	1–0
	1–1	14:50 – P. Kariya (C. Pronger, M. Lemieux)
	1–2	18:33 – J. Iginla (J. Sakic, S. Gagné)
B. Rafalski (M. Modano, B. Hull) (PP) – 35:30	2–2
	2–3	38:19 – J. Sakic (E. Jovanovski, R. Blake) (PP)
	2–4	56:01 – J. Iginla (S. Yzerman, J. Sakic)
	2–5	58:40 – J. Sakic (J. Iginla)

6 min
Penalties
8 min
33
Shots
39

=== Women's tournament ===
Roster

- Chris Bailey
- Laurie Baker
- Karyn Bye
- Julie Chu
- Natalie Darwitz
- Sara DeCosta
- Tricia Dunn-Luoma
- Cammi Granato
- Courtney Kennedy
- Andrea Kilbourne
- Katie King
- Shelley Looney
- Sue Merz
- A.J. Mleczko
- Tara Mounsey
- Jenny Schmidgall-Potter
- Angela Ruggiero
- Sarah Tueting
- Lyndsay Wall
- Krissy Wendell

Preliminary round

Pos	Team	Pld	W	D	L	GF	GA	GD	Pts	Qualification
1	United States (H)	3	3	0	0	27	1	+26	6	Semifinals
2	Finland	3	2	0	1	7	6	+1	4	Semifinals
3	Germany	3	0	1	2	6	18	−12	1	5–8th place semifinals
4	China	3	0	1	2	6	21	−15	1	5–8th place semifinals

Source: TSN
(H) Hosts

All times are local (UTC-7).

12 February 2002; 11:00	United States	10–0 (2–0, 4–0, 4–0)	Germany	E Center, West Valley City; Attendance: 8,504

Sara DeCosta
Goalies
Stephanie Wartosch-Kürten
Esther Thyßen
Referee:
(Canada) Laura Vanderhorst
Linesmen:
(Slovakia) Henrieta Hujdušová
(Russia) Marina Konstantinova

Bye (Potter, Mounsey) – 06:16	1–0
Baker (Bailey, Bye) – 15:05	2–0
Darwitz (Granato) – 21:44	3–0
Darwitz (PP) – 27:10	4–0
Bailey (Baker, Looney) – 27:33	5–0
Bye (King, Potter) – 28:53	6–0
Wendell – 41:13	7–0
Granato (Bye, Mounsey) (PP) – 48:00	8–0
Chu – 53:42	9–0
Mleczko (Chu) – 55:09	10–0

4 min
Penalties
8 min
57
Shots
8

14 February 2002; 16:00	China	1–12 (0–3, 1–5, 0–4)	United States	Peaks Ice Arena, Provo; Attendance: 6,325

Guo Hong
Goalies
Sarah Tueting
Referee:
(Canada) Laura Vanderhorst
Linesmen:
(Canada) Julie Bissonnette
(Canada) Sue Cassidy

	0–1	01:19 – Granato (Wendell, Darwitz)
	0–2	07:04 – Looney (Bailey, Baker)
	0–3	16:30 – Granato
	0–4	27:48 – King (Potter, Kennedy)
	0–5	29:22 – Baker (Wall)
	0–6	29:57 – Chu (Kennedy, Kilbourne)
	0–7	30:31 – King (Mleczko, Ruggiero)
Yang (Wang L.) – 36:01	1–7
	1–8	39:50 – Darwitz (Wendell)
	1–9	44:03 – Baker (King)
	1–10	44:33 – Granato (Chu)
	1–11	54:56 – Ruggiero (King, Potter)
	1–12	56:30 – Merz (Looney)

6 min
Penalties
29 min
10
Shots
71

16 February 2002; 11:00	United States	5–0 (3–0, 1–0, 1–0)	Finland	E Center, West Valley City; Attendance: 8,507

Sara DeCosta
Goalies
Tuula Puputti
Referee:
(Canada) Jacqui Palm
Linesmen:
(Canada) Sue Cassidy
(Canada) Julie Bissonnette

Darwitz (Mleczko, Granato) – 11:09	1–0
Darwitz (Ruggiero, DeCosta) (SH) – 15:19	2–0
Potter (Mounsey) (PP) – 18:13	3–0
Darwitz (Wendell) – 34:42	4–0
Kilbourne (Ruggiero) (PP) – 54:18	5–0

22 min
Penalties
26 min
47
Shots
21

Semifinal

19 February 2002; 16:30	United States	4–0 (2–0, 1–0, 1–0)	Sweden	E Center, West Valley City; Attendance: 7,738

Sarah Tueting
Goalies
Kim Martin
Referee:
(Canada) Jacqui Palm
Linesmen:
(Slovakia) Henrieta Hujdušová
(Finland) Johanna Suban

Granato (Mounsey, Wendell) – 17:16	1–0
King (Bye, Mleczko) – 19:32	2–0
Granato (Potter, Mounsey) (PP) – 28:57	3–0
Darwitz (Wendell, Granato) – 52:58	4–0

14 min
Penalties
12 min
32
Shots
10

Gold medal game

21 February 2002; 17:10	United States	2–3 (0–1, 1–2, 1–0)	Canada	E Center, West Valley City; Attendance: 8,599

Game reference

Sara DeCosta
Goalies
Kim St-Pierre
Referee:
(United States) Stacey Livingston
Linesmen:
(Finland) Johanna Suban
(Slovakia) Henrieta Hujdušová

	0–1	01:45 − Ouellette (Piper)
King (Granato, Mounsey) (PP) − 21:59	1–1
	1–2	24:10 − Wickenheiser (Goyette)
	1–3	39:59 − Hefford (Kellar, Brisson)
Bye (Mounsey, Potter) (PP) − 56:27	2–3

12 min
Penalties
26 min
27
Shots
29

== Luge ==
Men

Athlete	Event	Run 1		Run 2		Run 3		Run 4		Total	
Athlete	Event	Time	Rank	Time	Rank	Time	Rank	Time	Rank	Time	Rank
Tony Benshoof	Singles	44.776	7	45.653	29	44.787	17	44.886	5	3:00.102	17
Adam Heidt	Singles	44.660	3	44.750	5	44.421	4	44.775	4	2:58.606	4
Nick Sullivan	Singles	45.439	25	45.309	25	45.726	29	45.619	27	3:02.093	26
Brian Martin; Mark Grimmette	Doubles	43.111	3	43.105	1	—N/a				1:26.216	2nd place, silver medalist(s)
Chris Thorpe; Clay Ives	Doubles	43.013	2	43.207	3	—N/a				1:26.220	3rd place, bronze medalist(s)

Women

Athlete	Event	Run 1		Run 2		Run 3		Run 4		Total	
Athlete	Event	Time	Rank	Time	Rank	Time	Rank	Time	Rank	Time	Rank
Ashley Hayden	Singles	43.765	5	43.645	8	43.428	5	43.820	13	2:54.658	8
Becky Wilczak	Singles	43.509	3	43.481	5	43.420	4	43.844	17	2:54.254	5
Courtney Zablocki	Singles	43.934	12	44.103	22	43.734	12	43.383	4	2:55.154	13

== Nordic combined ==
Athlete	Event	Ski jumping		Cross-country		Total	
Athlete	Event	Points	Rank	Time	Rank	Time	Rank
Matt Dayton	Sprint	87.1	39	16:57.9	22	19:15.9	36
Bill Demong	Sprint	108.2	13	16:57.1	21	17:56.1	14
Todd Lodwick	Sprint	109.0	12	16:36.1	11	17:32.1	5
Johnny Spillane	Sprint	91.3	37	16:34.4	10	18:36.4	32
Matt Dayton	Individual	209.5	32	40:27.8	28	47:15.7	18
Bill Demong	Individual	239.5	8	40:58.1	36	39:54.5	19
Todd Lodwick	Individual	240.5	7	39:24.4	20	38:22.7	7
Johnny Spillane	Individual	218.0	26	40:57.5	35	45:05.5	32
Matt Dayton; Bill Demong; Todd Lodwick; Johnny Spillane	Team	905.0	3	48:20.1	4	49:54.1	4

== Short track speed skating ==
Men

Athlete	Event	Heat		Quarterfinal		Semifinal		Final	
Athlete	Event	Time	Rank	Time	Rank	Time	Rank	Time	Rank
Apolo Anton Ohno	500 m	43.214	2 Q	42.895	2 Q	Disqualified			11
Rusty Smith	500 m	42.849	2 Q	42.359	1 Q	41.916	1 Q	42.027	3rd place, bronze medalist(s)
Apolo Anton Ohno	1000 m	1:33.167	2 Q	1:28.650	1 Q	1:27.428	1 Q	1:30.160	2nd place, silver medalist(s)
Rusty Smith	1000 m	1:28.183 OR	1 Q	1:28.078	3	Did not advance			9
Apolo Anton Ohno	1500 m	—N/a		2:26.809	2 Q	2:25.152	2 Q	2:18.541	1st place, gold medalist(s)
Rusty Smith	1500 m	—N/a		2:25.179	1 Q	2:16.906	3 QB	B Final; 2:27.155	6
Ron Biondo; Apolo Anton Ohno; Rusty Smith; Dan Weinstein	5000 m relay	—N/a				7:09.788	1 Q	7:03.926	4

Women

Athlete	Event	Heat		Quarterfinal		Semifinal		Final	
Athlete	Event	Time	Rank	Time	Rank	Time	Rank	Time	Rank
Caroline Hallisey	500 m	45.535	2 Q	44.826	2 Q	44.307	2 Q	44.679	5
Amy Peterson	500 m	45.448	2 Q	46.120	3	Did not advance			21
Caroline Hallisey	1000 m	1:37.716	2 Q	1:33.007	3	Did not advance			10
Erin Porter	1000 m	1:56.409	4	Did not advance					28
Amy Peterson	1500 m	—N/a		2:27.062	3 Q	2:26.18	5	Did not advance	13
Erin Porter	1500 m	—N/a		DSQ		Did not advance			
Julie Goskowicz; Caroline Hallisey; Amy Peterson; Erin Porter	3000 m relay	—N/a				4:36.002	4 QB	B Final; 4:20.730	7

== Skeleton ==
Athlete	Event	Run 1		Run 2		Total	
Athlete	Event	Time	Rank	Time	Rank	Time	Rank
Lincoln DeWitt	Men's	51.63	9	51.20	5	1:42.83	5
Jim Shea, Jr.	Men's	50.89	1	51.07	3	1:41.96	1st place, gold medalist(s)
Chris Soule	Men's	51.89	13	51.09	4	1:42.98	7
Tristan Gale	Women's	52.26	1	52.85	2	1:45.11	1st place, gold medalist(s)
Lea Ann Parsley	Women's	52.27	2	52.94	4	1:45.21	2nd place, silver medalist(s)

== Ski jumping ==
Athlete	Event	Qualifying Round		Final Round					
Athlete	Event	Points	Rank	Jump 1	Rank	Jump 2	Rank	Total	Rank
Alan Alborn	Normal hill	114.5	11 Q	118.0	12 Q	122.0	12	240.0	11
Brendan Doran	Normal hill	91.5	36 Q	96.5	44	Did not advance			
Clint Jones	Normal hill	89.5	39	Did not advance					
Brian Welch	Normal hill	89.5	39	Did not advance					
Alan Alborn	Large hill	114.1	4 Q	105.4	34	Did not advance			
Brendan Doran	Large hill	68.1	43	Did not advance					
Clint Jones	Large hill	97.2	22 Q	94.4	42	Did not advance			
Tommy Schwall	Large hill	44.0	51	Did not advance					
Alan Alborn; Clint Jones; Tommy Schwall; Brian Welch	Team large hill	—N/a		372.8	10	355.6	13	728.4	11

== Snowboarding ==
Halfpipe
Men

Athlete	Event	Qualifying round 1		Qualifying round 2		Final			
Athlete	Event	Points	Rank	Points	Rank	Run 1	Run 2	Best	Rank
Tommy Czeschin	Halfpipe	41.8	2 Q	Bye		40.6	40.5	40.6	6
Danny Kass	Halfpipe	36.7	8	42.7	2 Q	42.5	41.5	42.5	2nd place, silver medalist(s)
Ross Powers	Halfpipe	33.9	13	42.1	3 Q	46.1	32.0	46.1	1st place, gold medalist(s)
Jarret Thomas	Halfpipe	19.7	26	43.5	1 Q	33.2	42.1	42.1	3rd place, bronze medalist(s)

Women

Athlete	Event	Qualifying round 1		Qualifying round 2		Finals			
Athlete	Event	Points	Rank	Points	Rank	Run 1	Run 2	Best	Rank
Tricia Byrnes	Halfpipe	30.8	9	35.7	4 Q	25.1	36.4	36.4	6
Kelly Clark	Halfpipe	42.1	1 Q	Bye		40.8	47.9	47.9	1st place, gold medalist(s)
Shannon Dunn	Halfpipe	31.3	8	39.0	2 Q	35.5	37.2	37.2	5

Parallel
Men

Athlete	Event	Qualification		Round one	Quarterfinal	Semifinal	Final / BM	
Athlete	Event	Time	Rank	Opposition Time	Opposition Time	Opposition Time	Opposition Time	Rank
Jeff Greenwood	Giant slalom	37.84	20	Did not advance				20
Chris Klug	Giant slalom	37.17	11 Q	Sylvestre (CAN); W −0.05	Feichter (ITA); W -1.03	Schoch (SUI); L DSQ	Bronze Final; Huet (FRA); W -1.36	3rd place, bronze medalist(s)
Peter Thorndike	Giant slalom	38.85	27	Did not advance				27

Women

Athlete	Event	Qualification		Round one	Quarterfinal	Semifinal	Final / BM	
Athlete	Event	Time	Rank	Opposition Time	Opposition Time	Opposition Time	Opposition Time	Rank
Rosey Fletcher	Giant slalom	45.11	26	Did not advance				26
Lisa Kosglow	Giant slalom	42.30	7 Q	Windahl (SWE); W −1.32	Ruby (FRA); L +2.70	Did not advance		8
Lisa Odynski	Giant slalom	45.47	27	Did not advance				27
Sondra Van Ert	Giant slalom	43.15	17	Did not advance				17

== Speed skating ==
Men

Athlete	Event	Race 1		Race 2		Total	
Athlete	Event	Time	Rank	Time	Rank	Total	Rank
Kip Carpenter	500 m	34.68 OR	3	34.79	5	69.47	3rd place, bronze medalist(s)
Joey Cheek	500 m	34.78	7	34.82	8	69.60	6
Casey FitzRandolph	500 m	34.42 OR	1	34.81	6	69.23 OR	1st place, gold medalist(s)
Marc Pelchat	500 m	37.59	34	34.99	13	72.58	28
Kip Carpenter	1000 m	—N/a				1:07.89	4
Joey Cheek	1000 m	—N/a				1:07.61	3rd place, bronze medalist(s)
Casey FitzRandolph	1000 m	—N/a				1:08.15	7
Nick Pearson	1000 m	—N/a				1:07.97	6
Joey Cheek	1500 m	—N/a				1:45.34	4
Derek Parra	1500 m	—N/a				1:43.95 WR	1st place, gold medalist(s)
Nick Pearson	1500 m	—N/a				1:45.51	6
J. P. Shilling	1500 m	—N/a				1:46.29	14
K. C. Boutiette	5000 m	—N/a				6:22.97	5
Derek Parra	5000 m	—N/a				6:17.98	2nd place, silver medalist(s)
Jondon Trevena	5000 m	—N/a				6:30.15	15
Jason Hedstrand	10000 m	—N/a				13:32.99	12
Derek Parra	10000 m	—N/a				13:33.44	13

Women

Athlete	Event	Race 1		Race 2		Total	
Athlete	Event	Time	Rank	Time	Rank	Total	Rank
Elli Ochowicz	500 m	38.85	21	38.86	22	77.71	22
Amy Sannes	500 m	38.86	22	DNF			
Becky Sundstrom	500 m	38.89	23	38.71	17	77.60	20
Chris Witty	500 m	38.37	17	38.36	12	76.73	14
Jennifer Rodriguez	1000 m	—N/a				1:14.24	3rd place, bronze medalist(s)
Amy Sannes	1000 m	—N/a				1:15.09	14
Becky Sundstrom	1000 m	—N/a				1:15.88	16
Chris Witty	1000 m	—N/a				1:13.83 WR	1st place, gold medalist(s)
Jennifer Rodriguez	1500 m	—N/a				1:55.32	3rd place, bronze medalist(s)
Amy Sannes	1500 m	—N/a				1:56.29	8
Becky Sundstrom	1500 m	—N/a				1:57.33	13
Chris Witty	1500 m	—N/a				1:55.71	5
Annie Driscoll	3000 m	—N/a				4:15.61	21
Catherine Raney	3000 m	—N/a				4:07.59	13
Jennifer Rodriguez	3000 m	—N/a				4:04.99	7
Annie Driscoll	5000 m	—N/a				7:35.23	14
Catherine Raney	5000 m	—N/a				7:06.89	9

== See also ==
- United States at the 2002 Winter Paralympics

== Notes and references ==
=== References ===
- "Olympic Medal Winners". International Olympic Committee.
