= Biathlon at the 2002 Winter Olympics – Women's pursuit =

Women's biathlon pursuit at the XIX Olympic Winter Games
- Venue: Soldier Hollow
- Dates: 16 February 2002
- Competitors: 52 from 21 nations
- Winning time: 31:07.7

Medalists
1st place, gold medalist(s)		Olga Pyleva	Russia
2nd place, silver medalist(s)		Kati Wilhelm	Germany
3rd place, bronze medalist(s)		Irina Nikulchina	Bulgaria

The Women's 10 kilometre pursuit biathlon competition at the 2002 Winter Olympics was held on 16 February, at Soldier Hollow. Competitors raced over four 2.5 kilometre loops and one 2.75 kilometre loop of the skiing course, shooting four times, twice prone and twice standing. Each miss was penalized by requiring the competitor to race over a 150-metre penalty loop.

The pursuit was a newly introduced race at the 2002 Olympics, with athletes starting in the same order, and with the same time gaps, as their finish in the sprint event a few days earlier. The top 60 from the sprint were eligible to enter, though three athletes of the top 60 opted not to start.

== Results ==
Kati Wilhelm, winner of the sprint race, started with a 16-second advantage over Uschi Disl, and nearly 40 seconds over her next chaser, Magdalena Forsberg. However, Wilhelm had also won the sprint at the 2001 World Championships, only to fail to medal in the pursuit, which was won by Liv Grete Skjelbreid-Poirée, starting 4th in Salt Lake. Forsberg had won the Overall and pursuit World Cups the previous season, as well as leading the 2001/02 World Cup, including winning each of the first three pursuit races of the year. Skjelbreid-Poirée was close to Forsberg in the rankings though, and had won the most recent World Cup event. Given that Forsberg and Skjelbreid-Poirée had also finished first and second at the test event in Salt Lake the year previous, both seemed serious threats to the top 3.

Wilhelm's lead was short-lived, as she missed three shots on her first attempts, falling quickly to 6th. Disl was unable to take advantage, though, missing two herself, meaning that Forsberg, who shot clear, held the lead after the shoot, followed by Skjelbreid-Poirée, who missed one shot, but still managed to emerge in second. On the second shoot, Forsberg missed her first, but with Skjelbreid-Poirée missing as well, the Swede was able to hold the lead. However, she was now pursued by Wilhelm, who rebounded from her early misses by shooting clear, along with Irina Nikulchina from Bulgaria and Slovenian Andreja Grašič, both of whom started well over a minute behind, but shot clear at each of the first two targets to sit in the top 4.

Skjelbreid-Poirée made up a lot of ground on Forsberg, and after both shot clear on the third lap, they left the range together. Nikulchina, shooting clear for a third time, was 5 seconds behind, while Grašič, also clear, was back by 15 seconds. Wilhelm, who came in second, missed her 4th shot of the race, falling to 5th, 30 seconds back, just ahead of a recovering Disl, France's Florence Baverel-Robert and a pair of Russians, Galina Kukleva and Olga Pyleva.

The final shoot produced some real drama. Skjelbreid-Poirée and Forsberg, now joined by Nikulchina, all missed twice. The group behind then took its shots, with the previous three all still working their way around the penalty loop. Baverel-Robert missed twice, while Disl's dismal shooting performance continued, as she missed three. Grašič and Kukleva also threw one wide, but Wilhelm and Pyleva each hit all five, and left together in first and second places. Forsberg, Skjelbreid-Poirée and Nikulchina also left within two seconds of each other, though more than 10 seconds after the leading two. In the end, Pyleva showed too much strength for Wilhelm, beating the German to the line by five seconds. In the race for bronze, Forsberg fell behind, and while Skjelbreid-Poirée was able to record the second best time on the last lap, it wasn't enough, as Nikulchina, who had participated in two Olympics as a cross-country skier, had the fastest time, and secured the bronze.

The race was started at 12:00.

Rank	Bib	Name	Country	Start	Time	Penalties	Deficit
1st place, gold medalist(s)	8	Olga Pyleva	Russia	1:03	31:07.7	1 (1+0+0+0)	
2nd place, silver medalist(s)	1	Kati Wilhelm	Germany	0:00	31:13.0	4 (3+0+1+0)	+5.3
3rd place, bronze medalist(s)	11	Irina Nikulchina	Bulgaria	1:16	31:15.8	2 (0+0+0+2)	+8.1
4	4	Liv Grete Poirée	Norway	0:43	31:18.3	4 (1+1+0+2)	+10.6
5	6	Galina Kukleva	Russia	0:51	31:31.7	3 (1+1+0+1)	+24.0
6	3	Magdalena Forsberg	Sweden	0:39	31:34.0	3 (0+1+0+2)	+26.3
7	12	Katrin Apel	Germany	1:20	31:47.9	3 (1+0+1+1)	+40.2
8	10	Andreja Grašič	Slovenia	1:14	32:01.9	1 (0+0+0+1)	+54.2
9	2	Uschi Disl	Germany	0:16	32:21.2	7 (2+2+0+3)	+1:13.5
10	15	Ekaterina Dafovska	Bulgaria	1:36	32:22.6	2 (0+1+1+0)	+1:14.9
11	14	Olga Nazarova	Belarus	1:33	32:24.5	1 (0+1+0+0)	+1:16.8
12	17	Pavlina Filipova	Bulgaria	1:39	32:35.1	2 (0+0+2+0)	+1:27.4
13	25	Andrea Henkel	Germany	2:00	32:35.4	1 (0+0+1+0)	+1:27.7
14	5	Florence Baverel-Robert	France	0:46	32:39.8	3 (1+0+0+2)	+1:32.1
15	19	Svetlana Ishmuratova	Russia	1:46	32:50.3	3 (0+0+2+1)	+1:42.6
16	16	Gunn Margit Andreassen	Norway	1:38	32:56.8	2 (0+0+1+1)	+1:49.1
17	7	Sandrine Bailly	France	0:54	32:57.2	4 (2+0+0+2)	+1:49.5
18	13	Martina Jašicová	Slovakia	1:30	33:26.4	2 (0+0+2+0)	+2:18.7
19	18	Anna Bogaliy	Russia	1:44	33:40.0	3 (0+0+1+2)	+2:32.3
20	24	Sanna-Leena Perunka	Finland	1:58	33:44.5	1 (0+0+0+1)	+2:36.8
21	21	Soňa Mihoková	Slovakia	1:51	33:57.4	3 (1+0+2+0)	+2:49.7
22	39	Kateřina Losmanová	Czech Republic	2:33	34:04.7	2 (1+1+0+0)	+2:57.0
23	29	Tamami Tanaka	Japan	2:19	34:07.7	2 (0+2+0+0)	+3:00.0
24	30	Hiromi Suga	Japan	2:22	34:18.8	1 (0+0+0+1)	+3:11.1
25	34	Eva Háková	Czech Republic	2:28	34:20.1	2 (0+1+0+1)	+3:12.4
26	31	Tetyana Vodopyanova	Ukraine	2:22	34:23.0	4 (0+1+2+1)	+3:15.3
27	9	Corinne Niogret	France	1:09	34:35.3	3 (1+2+0+0)	+3:27.6
28	44	Yevgeniya Kutsepalova	Belarus	2:45	34:40.1	2 (0+0+1+1)	+3:32.4
29	26	Lucija Larisi	Slovenia	2:03	34:40.2	4 (1+1+0+2)	+3:32.5
30	33	Elena Khrustaleva	Belarus	2:25	34:41.5	2 (0+1+0+1)	+3:33.8
31	22	Irena Česneková	Czech Republic	1:52	34:41.7	3 (1+1+1+0)	+3:34.0
32	27	Andreja Mali	Slovenia	2:04	34:46.3	3 (0+0+2+1)	+3:38.6
33	23	Delphyne Burlet	France	1:56	34:48.4	3 (0+0+3+0)	+3:40.7
34	32	Magda Rezlerová	Czech Republic	2:24	35:02.9	4 (1+1+1+1)	+3:55.2
35	35	Anna Murínová	Slovakia	2:29	35:14.6	3 (1+1+0+1)	+4:06.9
36	28	Ryoko Takahashi	Japan	2:17	35:20.6	3 (0+1+2+0)	+4:12.9
37	37	Outi Kettunen	Finland	2:30	35:48.6	4 (1+0+2+1)	+4:40.9
38	46	Michela Ponza	Italy	2:55	35:54.7	4 (0+1+2+1)	+4:47.0
39	38	Ann Elen Skjelbreid	Norway	2:33	35:56.6	6 (1+1+2+2)	+4:48.9
40	53	Gro Marit Istad Kristiansen	Norway	3:31	36:13.9	4 (1+1+1+1)	+5:06.2
41	45	Mami Shindo	Japan	2:55	36:28.6	3 (1+0+1+1)	+5:20.9
42	36	Saskia Santer	Italy	2:30	36:41.8	7 (1+2+2+2)	+5:34.1
43	43	Anna Stera-Kustusz	Poland	2:43	36:59.3	4 (0+1+2+1)	+5:51.6
44	20	Yu Shumei	China	1:48	37:02.6	6 (1+2+3+0)	+5:54.9
45	49	Kara Salmela	United States	3:03	37:07.7	5 (2+0+1+2)	+6:00.0
46	52	Katja Holanti	Finland	3:26	37:41.7	6 (2+1+2+1)	+6:34.0
47	50	Andrea Nahrgang	United States	3:07	38:08.5	3 (0+1+1+1)	+7:00.8
48	51	Valentina Ciurina	Moldova	3:08	38:19.7	5 (2+1+2+0)	+7:12.0
	54	Anita Nyman	Finland	3:36	LAP	(2+2+3+ )	
	55	Dana Cojocea	Romania	3:36	LAP	(2+0+3+ )	
	58	Andžela Brice	Latvia	3:51	LAP	(0+0+3+ )	
	60	Rachel Steer	United States	4:00	LAP	(2+4+ + )	
	40	Nathalie Santer	Italy	2:33	Did not start		
	41	Iva Karagiozova	Bulgaria	2:37	Did not start		
	42	Liu Xianying	China	2:38	Did not start		
	47	Nina Lemesh	Ukraine	2:56	Did not start		
	48	Olena Petrova	Ukraine	3:00	Did not start		
	56	Kong Yingchao	China	3:49	Did not start		
	57	Sun Ribo	China	3:51	Did not start		
	59	Olena Zubrilova	Ukraine	3:52	Did not start		
