= Biathlon at the 2002 Winter Olympics – Women's relay =

Women's biathlon relay at the XIX Olympic Winter Games
- Venue: Soldier Hollow
- Dates: 18 February 2002
- Competitors: 60 from 15 nations
- Winning time: 1:27:55.0

Medalists
1st place, gold medalist(s)		Katrin Apel; Uschi Disl; Andrea Henkel; Kati Wilhelm	Germany
2nd place, silver medalist(s)		Ann-Elen Skjelbreid; Linda Tjørhom; Gunn Margit Andreassen; Liv Grete Poirée	Norway
3rd place, bronze medalist(s)		Olga Pyleva; Galina Kukleva; Svetlana Ishmuratova; Albina Akhatova	Russia

The Women's 4 × 7.5 kilometre biathlon relay competition at the 2002 Winter Olympics 18 February, at Soldier Hollow. Each national team consisted of four members, with each skiing 7.5 kilometres and shooting twice, once prone and once standing.

At each shooting station, a competitor has eight shots to hit five targets; however, only five bullets are loaded in a magazine at one – if additional shots are required, the spare bullets must be loaded one at a time. If after the eight shots are taken, there are still targets not yet hit, the competitor must ski a 150-metre penalty loop.

== Results ==
The women's relay looked to be a battle between some traditional powers of the sport. Germany, having won three of the four World Cup relays coming into the Games, as well as being defending champions, were the only team to have more than one medal winner from the individual races on the team, with Uschi Disl, Kati Wilhelm and Andrea Henkel combining for 4 medals, 2 gold. The World Cup standings were closely fought, though, with defending World Cup winners Norway, led by Liv Grete Skjelbreid-Poirée, not far behind Germany in second. Russia were the defending World Champions, and expected a fast start from pursuit gold medalist Olga Pyleva, and the French, while not winning a medal yet at the Games, had won the last World Cup relay before Salt Lake.

The leaders after the first shoot were not one of the favoured teams, but Ukraine, with Olena Zubrilova shooting clear at her first shoot. Katrin Apel, the only member of the German team not to win a medal in the individual events, also shot clear, and left a few seconds behind Zubrilova. However, there wasn't much separation, as Russia, with pursuit champ Pyleva, Norway's Ann Elen Skjelbreid and Bulgaria, with Pavlina Filipova, were among those in close attention. At the second shoot, Zubrilova's strong form continued, as she shot clear, followed by another outsider, Olga Nazarova of Belarus. The only other team within 10 seconds was Russia, as Pyleva missed her second shot, but stayed close. Apel missed all of her extra rounds, requiring a lap of the penalty loop, and leaving Germany in 12th. Skjelbreid also had trouble for Norway, missing three times to leave her side 30 seconds back. By the exchange Pyleva had pulled ahead by a solid margin, handing off to Galina Kukleva with a ten second lead over Belarus. Skjelbreid made up for her mistakes somewhat, moving into 3rd, as Zubrilova faded for Ukraine. Apel also had a solid closing section, not gaining any time on Russia, but moving her team up to 6th.

Whatever struggles the Germans might have faced, though, were dissolved in the first section of Uschi Disl's leg. She made up ground on the leaders, and shot clear to leave in first, almost even with Lyudmila Lysenko of Belarus, who shot clear, and Kukleva, who had missed three shots. Irina Nikulchina made up substantial time for Bulgaria as well, pulling them to within 5 seconds. Norway, with Linda Tjørhom, missed one, and fell back to 6th. On the second shoot, Disl missed twice, but still managed to leave with a slight lead, as the slower Lysenko missed once, Nikulchina missed three times, and Kukleva had a disaster, missing five shots and needing two penalty loops, dropping her team to 8th. The new team in contention was Andreja Grašič's Slovenia, as some good speed saw her move up to 3rd, despite three misses. At the handover, Germany led, but Disl's skiing had widened the gap, now 20 seconds over the Bulgarians, with Slovenia and Belarus both fading somewhat.

Andrea Henkel, the individual champion, cemented the lead she'd been given, going clear on the first shoot, and leaving nearly 40 seconds ahead of second place Iva Karagiozova-Shkodreva of Bulgaria, who also shot clear. In third was Gunn Margit Andreassen of Norway, who missed one shot, but still managed to ski past Slovenia and Belarus. The second shoot was another perfect one for Henkel, now leading by almost a minute after Karagiozova required three extra rounds. These misses left Bulgaria in fourth, with Slovenia's Dijana Grudiček-Ravnikar shooting clear to move into second, and Andreassen missing just once to come out in third. The ski into the exchange saw the ranking shift again, though; while Germany were well ahead, Norway had raced past their opponents to reach the end 40 seconds behind the leaders. The same was true for Russia, as an incredible charge from Svetlana Ishmuratova saw them make up almost 40 seconds on the Germans, and go from 30 seconds behind Norway to just 11 at the final changeover.

Kati Wilhelm's opening shoot, going perfect, left little question about the gold medal; she would require a major collapse to fail her team. Liv Grete Skjelbreid-Poirée missed once, but kept the margin close, while Albina Akhatova was unable to match Ishmuratova's pace, and her one miss saw her substantially further down. Only Bulgaria, with Ekaterina Dafovska, also remained within 40 seconds of the Russians. Wilhelm put two shots wide on the final set of targets, but avoided the penalty loop, ensuring victory. Both Skjelbreid-Poirée and Akhatova missed twice as well, and neither could generate much pressure on their opponents ahead. Bulgaria had a last fight left in them, though, as Dafovska cut the Russians' lead in half after the first shoot, and managed to get within 6 seconds of the Russians for the podium, just falling short.

The race was held at 11:30.

Rank	Bib	Team	Result	Penalties	Deficit
1st place, gold medalist(s)	1	Germany; Katrin Apel; Uschi Disl; Andrea Henkel; Kati Wilhelm	1:27:55.0; 22:15.6; 21:19.2; 22:13.8; 22:06.4	0+0 1+7; 0+0 1+3; 0+0 0+2; 0+0 0+0; 0+0 0+2	–
2nd place, silver medalist(s)	2	Norway; Ann-Elen Skjelbreid; Linda Tjørhom; Gunn Margit Andreassen; Liv Grete Poirée	1:28:25.6; 22:01.0; 22:07.7; 22:18.5; 21:58.4	0+3 0+6; 0+0 0+3; 0+1 0+0; 0+1 0+1; 0+1 0+2	+30.6
3rd place, bronze medalist(s)	3	Russia; Olga Pyleva; Galina Kukleva; Svetlana Ishmuratova; Albina Akhatova	1:29:19.7; 21:32.4; 23:05.8; 22:00.1; 22:41.4	0+6 2+7; 0+1 0+1; 0+3 2+3; 0+1 0+1; 0+1 0+2	+1:24.7
4	11	Bulgaria; Pavlina Filipova; Irina Nikulchina; Iva Karagiozova; Ekaterina Dafovska	1:29:25.8; 22:11.9; 21:44.1; 23:29.2; 22:00.6	0+2 0+11; 0+1 0+3; 0+0 0+3; 0+0 0+3; 0+1 0+2	+1:30.8
5	5	Slovakia; Martina Jašicová; Anna Murínová; Marcela Pavkovčeková; Soňa Mihoková	1:30:11.5; 22:24.9; 21:57.7; 23:39.2; 22:09.7	0+4 1+4; 0+0 0+0; 0+1 0+0; 0+2 1+3; 0+1 0+1	+2:16.5
6	6	Slovenia; Lucija Larisi; Andreja Grašič; Dijana Grudiček; Tadeja Brankovič	1:30:18.0; 22:22.4; 21:38.6; 22:40.8; 23:36.2	0+6 0+7; 0+1 0+2; 0+0 0+3; 0+2 0+0; 0+3 0+2	+2:23.0
7	12	Belarus; Olga Nazarova; Lyudmila Lysenko; Yevgeniya Kutsepalova; Yelena Khrustalyova	1:31:01.6; 21:44.5; 22:23.7; 23:11.6; 23:41.8	0+1 0+6; 0+0 0+0; 0+0 0+1; 0+1 0+3; 0+0 0+2	+3:06.6
8	14	Czech Republic; Kateřina Losmanová; Magda Rezlerová; Irena Česneková; Eva Háková	1:31:07.6; 22:28.9; 22:14.3; 22:39.1; 23:45.3	0+4 0+4; 0+0 0+1; 0+1 0+0; 0+2 0+0; 0+1 0+3	+3:12.6
9	4	France; Delphyne Burlet; Florence Baverel-Robert; Sandrine Bailly; Corinne Niogret	1:31:09.3; 22:45.4; 22:46.1; 22:35.6; 23:02.2	0+4 0+7; 0+1 0+1; 0+0 0+3; 0+3 0+1; 0+0 0+2	+3:14.3
10	8	Ukraine; Olena Zubrilova; Olena Petrova; Nina Lemesh; Tetyana Vodopyanova	1:32:00.6; 22:04.0; 24:04.9; 23:19.2; 22:32.5	1+4 0+1; 0+0 0+0; 1+3 0+0; 0+0 0+1; 0+1 0+0	+4:05.6
11	7	Italy; Michela Ponza; Nathalie Santer; Katja Haller; Saskia Santer	1:34:03.7; 22:49.3; 24:18.8; 23:19.8; 23:35.8	0+4 2+5; 0+0 0+0; 0+2 2+3; 0+0 0+0; 0+2 0+2	+6:08.7
12	10	Finland; Katja Holanti; Sanna-Leena Perunka; Anita Nyman; Outi Kettunen	1:34:18.7; 23:21.5; 24:18.8; 23:19.8; 23:35.8	0+4 0+6; 0+1 0+1; 0+0 0+2; 0+1 0+3; 0+2 0+0	+6:23.7
13	9	China; Yu Shumei; Sun Ribo; Liu Xianying; Kong Yingchao	1:34:45.6; 23:25.1; 23:14.9; 24:35.2; 23:54.6	0+6 0+3; 0+3 0+0; 0+1 0+2; 0+2 0+0; 0+0 0+1	+6:50.6
14	13	Japan; Mami Shindo; Tamami Tanaka; Hiromi Suga; Ryoko Takahashi	1:35:09.8; 23:25.1; 23:14.9; 24:35.2; 23:54.6	0+8 1+7; 0+0 0+3; 0+3 0+0; 0+2 1+3; 0+3 0+1	+7:14.8
15	15	United States; Andrea Nahrgang; Kara Salmela; Rachel Steer; Kristina Sabasteanski	1:41:16.0; 25:23.7; 25:45.6; 24:21.1; 25:45.6	1+7 2+9; 0+0 1+3; 1+3 0+3; 0+2 0+0; 0+2 1+3	+13:21.0
