= Biathlon at the 2002 Winter Olympics – Women's sprint =

Women's biathlon sprint at the XIX Olympic Winter Games
- Venue: Soldier Hollow
- Dates: February 13, 2002
- Competitors: 74 from 27 nations
- Winning time: 20:41.4

Medalists
1st place, gold medalist(s)		Kati Wilhelm	Germany
2nd place, silver medalist(s)		Uschi Disl	Germany
3rd place, bronze medalist(s)		Magdalena Forsberg	Sweden

The Women's 7.5 kilometre sprint biathlon competition at the 2002 Winter Olympics was held on 13 February, at Soldier Hollow. Competitors raced over two 2.5 kilometre loops and one 3.0 kilometre loop of the skiing course, shooting two times, once prone and once standing. Each miss was penalized by requiring the competitor to race over a 150-metre penalty loop.

== Results ==
Two of the medalists from the women's Individual race were also strong challengers in the sprint, led by Magdalena Forsberg, the five-time defending World Cup overall champion, as well as the defending World Cup winner in the sprint. Kati Wilhelm was the defending world champion and Galina Kukleva was defending champion from the Nagano Games. The test event at Soldier Hollow in 2001 saw Uschi Disl take the win, ahead of Liv Grete Skjelbreid-Poirée and individual champion Andrea Henkel. Entering the Olympics, the sprint World Cup standings were closely contested, with Disl, Olena Zubrilova, Forsberg, Olga Pyleva and Wilhelm separated by just 7 points. Skjelbreid-Poirée was further behind, but was coming in on a winning streak, having taken each of the last two World Cup sprints.

Henkel, the first of the above to go out, was unable to recapture her shooting form from two days before, missing once on each shoot, and finishing well back, in 25th. Her teammate Wilhelm, starting shortly behind her, had no such problems, shooting clear and leading at each of the time checks. France's Florence Baverel-Robert also shot clear, but ended up 45 seconds behind Wilhelm. Pyleva and 1998 Olympic individual champion Ekaterina Dafovska were with in 7 seconds of Wilhelm after the first shoot, but both lost out on the second shoot, Pyleva missing once and finishing 8th, while Dafovska missed twice and ended up 15th.

Disl was also close to Wilhelm after the first shoot, but missed a shot on the second, leaving her too much to make up. She did cut into Wilhelm's time on the final loop, but not by enough, coming in 15.6 seconds behind. Kukleva was close to Wilhelm's time after the first shoot, but fell back, despite hitting all her shots, ending up nearly a minute behind. Skjelbreid-Poirée came the closest to catching Wilhelm at the first time check, finishing the lap just 4 seconds behind the German, but missed a shot on the second loop, and slumped behind after that, finishing 43 seconds back. Forsberg lost her chance for gold on the first round of shooting, missing one, and while she shot clear on the second opportunity, she continued to lose time. However, she did just manage to edge Skjelbreid-Poirée for the bronze medal.

The race was started at 13:30.

Rank	Bib	Name	Country	Time	Penalties	Deficit
1st place, gold medalist(s)	18	Kati Wilhelm	Germany	20:41.4	0 (0+0)	
2nd place, silver medalist(s)	37	Uschi Disl	Germany	20:57.0	1 (0+1)	+15.6
3rd place, bronze medalist(s)	58	Magdalena Forsberg	Sweden	21:20.4	1 (1+0)	+39.0
4	54	Liv Grete Poirée	Norway	21:24.1	1 (0+1)	+42.7
5	25	Florence Baverel-Robert	France	21:27.9	0 (0+0)	+46.5
6	47	Galina Kukleva	Russia	21:32.1	0 (0+0)	+50.7
7	51	Sandrine Bailly	France	21:35.7	1 (0+1)	+54.3
8	27	Olga Pyleva	Russia	21:44.2	1 (0+1)	+1:02.8
9	42	Corinne Niogret	France	21:50.3	0 (0+0)	+1:08.9
10	26	Andreja Grašič	Slovenia	21:55.6	1 (1+0)	+1:14.2
11	2	Irina Nikulchina	Bulgaria	21:57.0	2 (1+1)	+1:15.6
12	6	Katrin Apel	Germany	22:01.7	3 (1+2)	+1:20.3
13	19	Martina Jašicová	Slovakia	22:11.9	0 (0+0)	+1:30.5
14	36	Olga Nazarova	Belarus	22:14.9	1 (0+1)	+1:33.5
15	28	Ekaterina Dafovska	Bulgaria	22:17.7	2 (0+2)	+1:36.3
16	46	Gunn Margit Andreassen	Norway	22:19.7	1 (0+1)	+1:38.3
17	52	Pavlina Filipova	Bulgaria	22:20.6	1 (0+1)	+1:39.2
18	10	Anna Bogaliy	Russia	22:25.8	2 (0+2)	+1:44.4
19	35	Svetlana Ishmuratova	Russia	22:27.3	2 (0+2)	+1:45.9
20	33	Yu Shumei	China	22:29.9	1 (1+0)	+1:48.5
21	57	Soňa Mihoková	Slovakia	22:32.1	1 (0+1)	+1:50.7
22	43	Irena Česneková	Czech Republic	22:33.5	0 (0+0)	+1:52.1
23	8	Delphyne Burlet	France	22:37.7	1 (1+0)	+1:56.3
24	13	Sanna-Leena Perunka	Finland	22:39.9	1 (0+1)	+1:58.5
25	14	Andrea Henkel	Germany	22:41.1	2 (1+1)	+1:59.7
26	74	Lucija Larisi	Slovenia	22:44.7	1 (1+0)	+2:03.3
27	15	Andreja Mali	Slovenia	22:45.5	1 (0+1)	+2:04.1
28	38	Ryoko Takahashi	Japan	22:58.3	2 (2+0)	+2:16.9
29	64	Tamami Tanaka	Japan	23:00.0	2 (2+0)	+2:18.6
30	72	Hiromi Suga	Japan	23:03.5	2 (1+1)	+2:22.1
31	4	Tetyana Vodopyanova	Ukraine	23:03.8	2 (0+2)	+2:22.4
32	53	Magda Rezlerová	Czech Republic	23:05.0	2 (1+1)	+2:23.6
33	5	Elena Khrustaleva	Belarus	23:06.6	2 (1+1)	+2:25.2
34	12	Eva Háková	Czech Republic	23:09.4	1 (1+0)	+2:28.0
35	45	Anna Murínová	Slovakia	23:10.0	1 (1+0)	+2:28.6
36	21	Saskia Santer	Italy	23:11.2	2 (2+0)	+2:29.8
37	59	Outi Kettunen	Finland	23:11.3	1 (0+1)	+2:29.9
38	66	Ann Elen Skjelbreid	Norway	23:14.2	3 (1+2)	+2:32.8
39	65	Kateřina Losmanová	Czech Republic	23:14.6	2 (0+2)	+2:33.2
40	55	Nathalie Santer	Italy	23:14.7	3 (1+2)	+2:33.3
41	68	Iva Karagiozova	Bulgaria	23:18.0	1 (0+1)	+2:36.6
42	71	Liu Xianying	China	23:18.9	1 (1+0)	+2:37.5
43	17	Anna Stera-Kustusz	Poland	23:24.6	0 (0+0)	+2:43.2
44	70	Yevgeniya Kutsepalova	Belarus	23:26.5	1 (1+0)	+2:45.1
45	20	Mami Shindo	Japan	23:36.8	2 (2+0)	+2:55.4
46	49	Michela Ponza	Italy	23:36.9	2 (0+2)	+2:55.5
47	48	Nina Lemesh	Ukraine	23:37.4	1 (1+0)	+2:56.0
48	63	Olena Petrova	Ukraine	23:40.9	2 (1+1)	+2:59.5
49	40	Kara Salmela	United States	23:44.1	3 (1+2)	+3:02.7
50	61	Andrea Nahrgang	United States	23:48.7	1 (1+0)	+3:07.3
51	32	Valentina Ciurina	Moldova	23:49.7	1 (0+1)	+3:08.3
52	23	Katja Holanti	Finland	24:07.2	4 (1+3)	+3:25.8
53	44	Gro Marit Istad Kristiansen	Norway	24:12.7	4 (3+1)	+3:31.3
54	50	Anita Nyman	Finland	24:17.0	4 (2+2)	+3:35.6
55	29	Dana Cojocea	Romania	24:17.3	1 (0+1)	+3:35.9
56	1	Kong Yingchao	China	24:30.2	3 (2+1)	+3:48.8
57	56	Sun Ribo	China	24:32.4	3 (2+1)	+3:51.0
58	24	Andžela Brice	Latvia	24:32.5	1 (0+1)	+3:51.1
59	41	Olena Zubrilova	Ukraine	24:33.2	4 (2+2)	+3:51.8
60	9	Rachel Steer	United States	24:41.7	3 (2+1)	+4:00.3
61	3	Éva Tófalvi	Romania	24:43.7	3 (2+1)	+4:02.3
62	34	Yelena Dubok	Kazakhstan	24:50.1	1 (1+0)	+4:08.7
63	67	Tadeja Brankovič	Slovenia	25:14.0	5 (4+1)	+4:32.6
64	69	Tatiana Kutlíková	Slovakia	25:18.3	5 (3+2)	+4:36.9
65	62	Kseniya Zikunkova	Belarus	25:21.5	5 (3+2)	+4:40.1
66	11	Diana Rasimovičiūtė	Lithuania	25:41.4	3 (2+1)	+5:00.0
67	7	Zsuzsanna Bekecs	Hungary	25:42.1	1 (1+0)	+5:00.7
68	73	Siegrid Pallhuber	Italy	26:20.9	4 (1+3)	+5:39.5
69	30	Kim Ja-youn	South Korea	26:45.2	3 (1+2)	+6:03.8
70	16	Despoina Vavatsi	Greece	27:11.3	2 (0+2)	+6:29.9
71	39	Ivett Szöllősi	Hungary	27:17.6	4 (2+2)	+6:36.2
72	60	Alexandra Rusu	Romania	27:20.0	6 (3+3)	+6:38.6
73	31	Natalia Lovece	Argentina	29:33.2	8 (3+5)	+8:51.8
74	22	Claudia Barrenechea	Chile	30:15.1	5 (3+2)	+9:33.7
