= Vita Yakymchuk =

Ukrainian cross-country skier (born 1980)

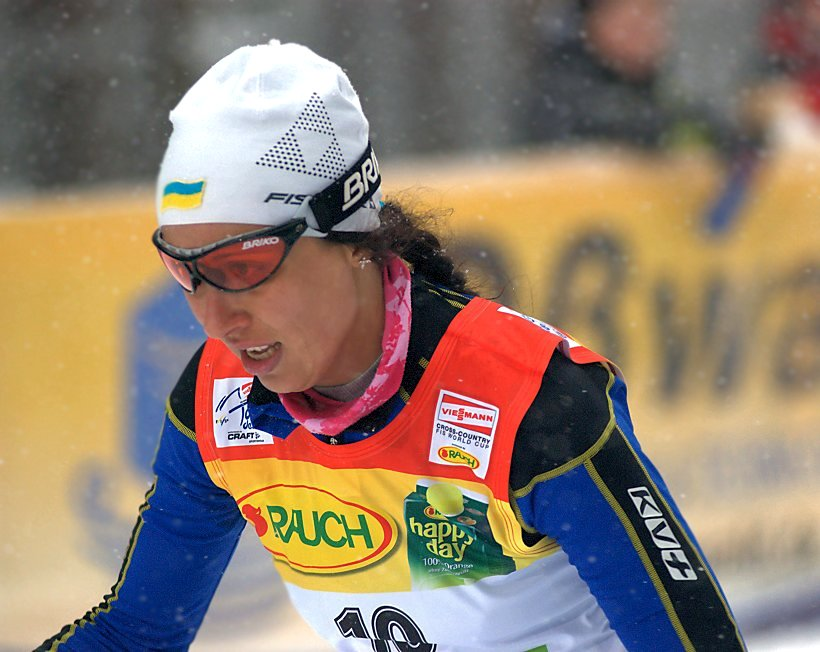
- Yakymchuk in 2010

Personal information
- Nationality: Ukraine
- Born: 7 April 1980 (age 46) Kyiv, Ukrainian SSR, Soviet Union

Sport
- Sport: Skiing

World Cup career
- Seasons: 11 – (1999–2002, 2004–2007, 2009–2011
- Indiv. starts: 60
- Indiv. podiums: 0
- Team starts: 9
- Team podiums: 0
- Overall titles: 0 – (70th in 2005)
- Discipline titles: 0
Medal record
Women's cross-country skiing
Representing Ukraine
Winter Universiade
Silver medal – second place	2007 Turin	15 km mass start
Bronze medal – third place	1999 Poprad	Relay

Vita Mykolayivna Yakymchuk (Ukrainian: Віта Миколаївна Якимчук; born April 7, 1980) is a Ukrainian cross-country skier who has competed since 1998. Competing in three Winter Olympics, she earned her best finish of eighth in the 4 × 5 km relay at Turin in 2006 and had her best individual finish of 22nd in the 30 km event at those same games.

Yakymchuk's best finish at the FIS Nordic World Ski Championships was 12th twice in the 4 × 5 km relay (2007, 2009) while her best individual finish was 25th in the 7.5 km + 7.5 km double pursuit event at Oberstdorf in 2005.

Her best World Cup finish was eighth in the 4 × 5 km relay at Finland in 2001 while her best individual finish was 13th in a 15 km event at Austria in 2004.

== Cross-country skiing results ==
All results are sourced from the International Ski Federation (FIS).

=== Olympic Games ===
Year	Age	10 km	15 km	Pursuit	30 km	Sprint	4 × 5 km relay	Team sprint
2002	21	—	44	—	—	41	—	—N/a
2006	25	—	—N/a	26	22	36	8	—
2010	29	—	—N/a	45	—	—	—	—

=== World Championships ===
Year	Age	10 km	15 km	Pursuit	30 km	Sprint	4 × 5 km relay	Team sprint
2001	20	59	—	—	CNX^{[a]}	35	—	—N/a
2003	22	—	—	48	36	33	—	—N/a
2005	24	40	—N/a	25	—	—	DSQ	13
2007	26	—	—N/a	DNS	—	—	—	12
2009	28	36	—N/a	37	33	31	11	—
2011	30	—	—N/a	—	DNF	60	—	15

a. ^{1} Cancelled due to extremely cold weather.

=== World Cup ===
==== Season standings ====
Season	Age	Discipline standings					Ski Tour standings		
Season	Age	Overall	Distance	Long Distance	Middle Distance	Sprint	Nordic Opening	Tour de Ski	World Cup Final
1999	18	NC	—N/a	NC	—N/a	—	—N/a	—N/a	—N/a
2000	19	NC	—N/a	NC	NC	NC	—N/a	—N/a	—N/a
2001	20	109	—N/a	—N/a	—N/a	NC	—N/a	—N/a	—N/a
2002	21	NC	—N/a	—N/a	—N/a	NC	—N/a	—N/a	—N/a
2004	23	NC	NC	—N/a	—N/a	—	—N/a	—N/a	—N/a
2005	24	70	46	—N/a	—N/a	—	—N/a	—N/a	—N/a
2006	25	106	74	—N/a	—N/a	—	—N/a	—N/a	—N/a
2007	26	NC	NC	—N/a	—N/a	—	—N/a	—	—N/a
2009	28	NC	NC	—N/a	—N/a	NC	—N/a	—	—
2010	29	NC	NC	—N/a	—N/a	NC	—N/a	39	—
2011	30	NC	NC	—N/a	—N/a	—	—	—	—
