= Cross-country skiing at the 2002 Winter Olympics – Women's 10 kilometre classical =

Women's 10 kilometre classical at the XIX Olympic Winter Games
- Venue: Soldier Hollow
- Dates: 12 February 2002
- Competitors: 61 from 23 nations
- Winning time: 28:05.6

Medalists
1st place, gold medalist(s)		Bente Skari	Norway
2nd place, silver medalist(s)		Yuliya Chepalova	Russia
3rd place, bronze medalist(s)		Stefania Belmondo	Italy

The women's 10 kilometre classical cross-country skiing competition at the 2002 Winter Olympics in Salt Lake City, United States, was held on 12 February at Soldier Hollow.

Each skier started at half a minute intervals, skiing the entire 10 kilometre course. The defending Olympic champion was the Russia Larisa Lazutina, who won in Nagano, but the 10 kilometre event was then held as a pursuit.

== The race ==
Early in the race, Norwegian Bente Skari was well behind Russian Olga Danilova. Danilova led by over 15 seconds at 5.8 km, but Skari had closed to within 10 seconds at 8.7 km. Norway's Skari finished strongly, defeating Danilova to win by 2 seconds. The bronze medal went to Russian Yuliya Chepalova, the 2000-01 World Cup champion. Fourth was another Russian, Larisa Lazutina.

In October 2003, Olga Danilova was disqualified for use of darpopoietin, an erythropoietin analogue. In January 2004 Lazutina was disqualified for use of the same substance. Chepalova was moved up to the silver medal, while fifth-place finisher Stefania Belmondo was awarded the bronze medal. Chepalova was also later found guilty of doping, but her results were left unaffected.

== Results ==
The race was started at 09:00.

Rank	Bib	Name	Country	Time	Deficit
1st place, gold medalist(s)	54	Bente Skari	Norway	28:05.6	
2nd place, silver medalist(s)	50	Yuliya Chepalova	Russia	28:09.9	+4.3
3rd place, bronze medalist(s)	43	Stefania Belmondo	Italy	28:45.8	+40.2
4	55	Beckie Scott	Canada	28:49.2	+43.6
5	45	Lyubov Yegorova	Russia	28:50.7	+45.1
6	53	Hilde Gjermundshaug Pedersen	Norway	28:56.2	+50.6
7	41	Satu Salonen	Finland	29:02.3	+56.7
8	58	Petra Majdič	Slovenia	29:03.9	+58.3
9	46	Anita Moen	Norway	29:15.5	+1:09.9
10	59	Viola Bauer	Germany	29:30.0	+1:24.4
11	26	Iryna Terelya	Ukraine	29:35.8	+1:30.2
12	51	Valentyna Shevchenko	Ukraine	29:42.7	+1:37.1
13	39	Sara Renner	Canada	29:46.7	+1:41.1
14	44	Svetlana Nageykina	Belarus	29:48.4	+1:42.8
15	24	Natascia Leonardi Cortesi	Switzerland	29:57.5	+1:51.9
16	60	Lina Andersson	Sweden	30:00.1	+1:54.5
17	27	Aurélie Perrillat-Collomb Storti	France	30:00.2	+1:54.6
18	47	Manuela Henkel	Germany	30:00.5	+1:54.9
19	7	Elin Ek	Sweden	30:02.3	+1:56.7
20	5	Marianna Longa	Italy	30:04.0	+1:58.4
21	28	Svetlana Shishkina	Kazakhstan	30:06.7	+2:01.1
22	10	Jenny Olsson	Sweden	30:09.5	+2:03.9
23	23	Milaine Thérault	Canada	30:12.6	+2:07.0
24	42	Oksana Yatskaya	Kazakhstan	30:13.9	+2:08.3
25	57	Tina Bay	Norway	30:16.3	+2:10.7
26	38	Kamila Rajdlová	Czech Republic	30:17.9	+2:12.3
27	25	Vera Zyatikova	Belarus	30:20.5	+2:14.9
28	48	Kati Sundqvist	Finland	30:24.0	+2:18.4
29	2	Yelena Antonova	Kazakhstan	30:27.3	+2:21.7
30	35	Nataša Lačen	Slovenia	30:31.3	+2:25.7
31	31	Sumiko Yokoyama	Japan	30:32.3	+2:26.7
32	22	Kanoko Goto	Japan	30:36.6	+2:31.0
33	21	Svetlana Deshevykh	Kazakhstan	30:39.2	+2:33.6
34	16	Antonella Confortola	Italy	30:42.2	+2:36.6
35	15	Nataliya Zyatikova	Belarus	30:44.2	+2:38.6
36	32	Wendy Wagner	United States	30:50.7	+2:45.1
37	11	Annmari Viljanmaa	Finland	30:51.8	+2:46.2
38	36	Nina Kemppel	United States	30:51.9	+2:46.3
39	29	Cristina Paluselli	Italy	30:59.4	+2:53.8
40	30	Anna Dahlberg	Sweden	31:01.7	+2:56.1
41	12	Olena Rodina	Ukraine	31:07.4	+3:01.8
42	18	Katrin Šmigun	Estonia	31:10.2	+3:04.6
43	6	Yelena Kalugina	Belarus	31:10.9	+3:05.3
44	3	Hou Yuxia	China	31:30.6	+3:25.0
45	4	Jaime Fortier	Canada	31:42.1	+3:36.5
46	40	Jaroslava Bukvajová	Slovakia	31:50.5	+3:44.9
47	37	Madoka Natsumi	Japan	31:54.1	+3:48.5
48	1	Tomomi Otaka	Japan	32:27.9	+4:22.3
49	20	Ilona Bublová	Czech Republic	32:32.8	+4:27.2
50	14	Luan Zhengrong	China	32:35.3	+4:29.7
51	34	Piret Niglas	Estonia	32:49.1	+4:43.5
52	8	Tessa Benoit	United States	33:09.1	+5:03.5
53	19	Aelin Peterson	United States	33:18.9	+5:13.3
54	17	Lee Chae-won	South Korea	34:04.1	+5:58.5
55	13	Maja Kezele	Croatia	34:10.8	+6:05.2
56	9	Margarita Nikolyan	Armenia	38:16.4	+10:10.8
57	61	Franziska Becskehazy	Brazil	46:46.0	+18:40.4
	33	Laurence Rochat	Switzerland	Did not finish	
	56	Kristina Šmigun	Estonia	Did not finish	
DSQ	49	Olga Danilova	Russia	~~28:08.1~~	~~+2.5~~
DSQ	52	Larisa Lazutina	Russia	~~28:21.6~~	~~+16.0~~
