= Tessa Benoit =

American cross-country skier (born 1977)

Personal information
- Nationality: United States
- Born: March 17, 1977 (age 49) Hanover, New Hampshire, United States

Sport
- Sport: Skiing
- Club: Subaru Factory Team

World Cup career
- Seasons: 2 – (1999, 2001)
- Indiv. starts: 3
- Indiv. podiums: 0
- Team starts: 1
- Team podiums: 0
- Overall titles: 0 – (85th in 2001)
- Discipline titles: 0

Tessa Benoit (born March 17, 1977) is an American cross-country skier. She competed in two events at the 2002 Winter Olympics. Born in Hanover, New Hampshire, but raised in South Pomfret, Vermont Benoit also competed collegiately for the University of Vermont ski team.

== Cross-country skiing results ==
All results are sourced from the International Ski Federation (FIS).

=== Olympic Games ===
Year	Age	10 km	15 km	Pursuit	30 km	Sprint	4 × 5 km relay
2002	24	52	—	—	—	38	—

=== World Championships ===
Year	Age	5 km	10 km	15 km	Pursuit	30 km	Sprint	4 × 5 km relay
1999	21	73	—N/a	—	DNF	—	—N/a	—
2001	23	—N/a	54	—	63	CNX^{[a]}	42	12

a. ^{1} Cancelled due to extremely cold weather.

=== World Cup ===
==== Season standings ====
Season	Age			
Season	Age	Overall	Long Distance	Sprint
1999	21	NC	NC	—
2001	23	85	—N/a	59
