= Ilona Bublová =

Czech cross-country skier

Personal information
- Nationality: Czech Republic
- Born: 16 June 1977 (age 49) Jablonec nad Nisou, Czechoslovakia

Sport
- Sport: Skiing

World Cup career
- Seasons: 2 – (1999, 2002)
- Indiv. starts: 2
- Indiv. podiums: 0
- Team starts: 0
- Overall titles: 0
- Discipline titles: 0

Ilona Bublová (born 16 June 1977) is a Czech cross-country skier. She competed in three events at the 2002 Winter Olympics.

== Cross-country skiing results ==
All results are sourced from the International Ski Federation (FIS).

=== Olympic Games ===
Year	Age	10 km	15 km	Pursuit	30 km	Sprint	4 × 5 km relay
2002	24	49	51	—	—	43	—

=== World Cup ===
==== Season standings ====
Season	Age			
Season	Age	Overall	Long Distance	Sprint
1999	21	NC	NC	—
2002	24	NC	—N/a	—
