= Kristina Joder =

American cross-country skier (born 1978)

Personal information
- Born: July 11, 1978 (age 48) Springfield, Vermont, United States

Sport
- Sport: Skiing
- Club: Subaru Factory Team

World Cup career
- Seasons: 1 – (2001)
- Indiv. starts: 1
- Indiv. podiums: 0
- Team starts: 0
- Discipline titles: 0

Kristina Joder (born July 11, 1978) is an American cross-country skier. She competed in two events at the 2002 Winter Olympics.

== Cross-country skiing results ==
All results are sourced from the International Ski Federation (FIS).

=== Olympic Games ===
Year	Age	10 km	15 km	Pursuit	30 km	Sprint	4 × 5 km relay
2002	23	—	—	—	—	42	—

=== World Cup ===
==== Season standings ====
Season	Age		
Season	Age	Overall	Sprint
2001	22	NC	NC
