= Cross-country skiing at the 2002 Winter Olympics – Women's 15 kilometre freestyle mass start =

Women’s 15 kilometre mass start at the XIX Olympic Winter Games
- Venue: Soldier Hollow
- Dates: 9 February 2002
- Competitors: 60 from 23 nations
- Winning time: 39:54.4

Medalists
1st place, gold medalist(s)		Stefania Belmondo	Italy
2nd place, silver medalist(s)		Kateřina Neumannová	Czech Republic
3rd place, bronze medalist(s)		Yuliya Chepalova	Russia

The Women's 15 kilometre freestyle mass start cross-country skiing competition at the 2002 Winter Olympics in Salt Lake City, United States, was held on 9 February at Soldier Hollow.

All 60 skiers began at once in a mass start. 2002 was the first time that a mass start was held in the Olympics.

== The Race ==
This was the first Winter Olympic cross-country event skied entirely as a mass start race. Previously, this event was held at an interval start. It was also the first medal event across all sports in Salt Lake City, starting shortly before the men raced 30 km. The 2001 World Champion was Bente Skari of Norway elected not to contest this race, even though she had been the dominant female cross-country racer over the past five years.

The early leader in the race was Russian Yuliya Chepalova, but by 9 km, Italy's Stefania Belmondo, the 1999 World Champion in the event, moved ahead, until her pole broke at 10.5 km. She dropped back to 10th place, but trailed the leader, Larisa Lazutina, by only 10 seconds. Belmondo was given a pole by a French official but it was very long, so she struggled for over 500 metres until an Italian coach gave her one of her own poles. She then powered ahead, caught Lazutina and won a narrow victory by 1.8 seconds. Behind them, Czech skier Katerina Neumannová came in for the bronze medal. But Lazutina would not keep her silver medal. After the pursuit race, held six days later, she was found to have tested positive for darpopoietin, an erythropoietin analogue, and was disqualified in late 2003. Neumannová was moved up to silver medal, and Chepalova would get the bronze. Chepalova and fourth-placed Finland's Kaisa Varis failed drug tests later in their careers, but their Olympic results were left unaffected.

== Results ==
The race was started at 09:00.

Rank	Bib	Name	Country	Time	Deficit
1st place, gold medalist(s)	3	Stefania Belmondo	Italy	39:54.4	
2nd place, silver medalist(s)	4	Kateřina Neumannová	Czech Republic	40:01.3	+6.9
3rd place, bronze medalist(s)	1	Yuliya Chepalova	Russia	40:02.7	+8.3
4	10	Kaisa Varis	Finland	40:04.1	+9.7
5	12	Svetlana Nageykina	Belarus	40:17.9	+23.5
6	7	Gabriella Paruzzi	Italy	40:25.7	+31.3
7	8	Kristina Šmigun	Estonia	40:33.6	+39.2
8	20	Karine Philippot	France	40:38.6	+44.2
9	18	Iryna Terelya	Ukraine	40:39.4	+45.0
10	9	Sabina Valbusa	Italy	40:48.3	+53.9
11	6	Olga Zavyalova	Russia	40:53.3	+58.9
12	14	Evi Sachenbacher	Germany	40:57.6	+1:03.2
13	11	Yelena Burukhina	Russia	41:01.1	+1:06.7
14	5	Hilde Gjermundshaug Pedersen	Norway	41:47.8	+1:53.4
15	34	Natascia Leonardi Cortesi	Switzerland	41:56.3	+2:01.9
16	30	Antonella Confortola	Italy	41:57.8	+2:03.4
17	24	Vera Zyatikova	Belarus	42:04.5	+2:10.1
18	27	Nataliya Zyatikova	Belarus	42:04.5	+2:10.1
19	21	Riitta-Liisa Lassila	Finland	42:14.3	+2:19.9
20	43	Kateřina Hanušová	Czech Republic	42:15.7	+2:21.3
21	15	Valentyna Shevchenko	Ukraine	42:16.0	+2:21.6
22	29	Sumiko Yokoyama	Japan	42:16.2	+2:21.8
23	44	Katrin Šmigun	Estonia	42:25.6	+2:31.2
24	39	Annick Pierrel	France	42:26.7	+2:32.3
25	33	Oxana Yatskaya	Kazakhstan	42:46.0	+2:51.6
26	31	Claudia Nystad	Germany	42:49.5	+2:55.1
27	32	Kanoko Goto	Japan	42:50.4	+2:56.0
28	13	Vibeke Skofterud	Norway	42:50.9	+2:56.5
29	28	Nina Kemppel	United States	42:53.1	+2:58.7
30	37	Anna-Carin Olofsson	Sweden	42:53.8	+2:59.4
31	38	Brigitte Albrecht-Loretan	Switzerland	42:54.4	+3:00.0
32	35	Nataša Lačen	Slovenia	43:05.0	+3:10.6
33	26	Svetlana Shishkina	Kazakhstan	43:05.1	+3:10.7
34	36	Amanda Fortier	Canada	43:38.7	+3:44.3
35	58	Anke Reschwamm Schulze	Germany	43:53.1	+3:58.7
36	22	Anna Dahlberg	Sweden	43:53.7	+3:59.3
37	41	Jaime Fortier	Canada	43:54.0	+3:59.6
38	25	Elin Ek	Sweden	43:55.3	+4:00.9
39	23	Jenny Karin Olsson	Sweden	43:57.7	+4:03.3
40	49	Nataliya Sviridova-Kalinovskaya	Belarus	44:09.2	+4:14.8
41	46	Helena Erbenová	Czech Republic	44:17.8	+4:23.4
42	42	Midori Furusawa	Japan	44:41.8	+4:47.4
43	50	Barbara Jones	United States	45:04.3	+5:09.9
44	45	Vita Yakymchuk	Ukraine	45:26.7	+5:32.3
45	53	Darya Starostina	Kazakhstan	45:28.8	+5:34.4
46	47	Lee Chae-won	South Korea	45:37.9	+5:43.5
47	56	Hou Yuxia	China	45:42.2	+5:47.8
48	52	Irina Terentjeva	Lithuania	45:45.4	+5:51.0
49	55	Nataliya Isachenko	Kazakhstan	45:51.4	+5:57.0
50	17	Marit Bjørgen	Norway	47:07.4	+7:13.0
51	48	Ilona Bublová	Czech Republic	47:31.8	+7:37.4
52	54	Luan Zhengrong	China	47:43.7	+7:49.3
53	59	Kristina Joder	United States	48:06.0	+8:11.6
54	57	Maja Kezele	Croatia	48:43.1	+8:48.7
	16	Maj Helen Sorkmo	Norway	Did not finish	
	19	Annmari Viljanmaa	Finland	Did not finish	
	40	Nobuko Fukuda	Japan	Did not finish	
	60	Elena Gorohova	Moldova	Did not finish	
	51	Margarit Nikolyan	Armenia	Disqualified	
DSQ	2	Larisa Lazutina	Russia	~~39:56.2~~	~~+1.8~~
