= Elena Rodina =

Elena Rodina may refer to:

- Olena Rodina (born 1975), Ukrainian cross-country skier
- Yelena Rodina (born 1967), Russian high jumper later known under married name Yelena Gulyayeva
