= Barbara Jones (skier) =

American cross-country skier (born 1977)

Personal information
- Born: January 6, 1977 (age 49) Stillwater, Minnesota, United States

Sport
- Sport: Skiing

World Cup career
- Seasons: 1 – (2001)
- Indiv. starts: 1
- Indiv. podiums: 0
- Team starts: 1
- Team podiums: 0
- Overall titles: 0
- Discipline titles: 0

Barbara Jones (born January 6, 1977) is an American cross-country skier. She competed in three events at the 2002 Winter Olympics. Jones attended Saint Paul Central High School where she won three straight Minnesota State High School League championships in 1993, 1994, and 1995. She also placed second in the 1,600 meter and 3,200 meter races at the state track meet in 1994. The Star Tribune described her as the best high school level skier from the state until the emergence of Jessie Diggins. She graduated from Dartmouth College in 1999.

== Cross-country skiing results ==
All results are sourced from the International Ski Federation (FIS).

=== Olympic Games ===
Year	Age	10 km	15 km	Pursuit	30 km	Sprint	4 × 5 km relay
2002	25	—	43	—	35	—	13

=== World Cup ===
==== Season standings ====
Season	Age		
Season	Age	Overall	Sprint
2001	24	NC	NC
