= Brian Welsh =

Brian Welsh may refer to:

- Brian Welsh (footballer) (born 1969), Scottish football manager and former player
- Brian Welsh (filmmaker) (born 1981), Scottish filmmaker

== See also ==
- Brian Welch (born 1970), American musician
- Brian Welch (ski jumper) (born 1984), British ski jumper
