= Wendy Wagner =

American skier (1973–2025)

Personal information
- Born: October 31, 1973 Salt Lake City, Utah, U.S.
- Died: November 6, 2025 (aged 52) Salt Lake City, Utah, U.S.

Sport
- Sport: Skiing
- Club: APU Ski Team

World Cup career
- Seasons: 7 – (1999, 2001–2006)
- Indiv. starts: 39
- Indiv. podiums: 0
- Team starts: 7
- Team podiums: 0
- Overall titles: 0 – (75th in 2002)
- Discipline titles: 0

Wendy Kay Wagner (October 31, 1973 – November 6, 2025) was an American cross-country skier. She competed at the 2002 Winter Olympics and the 2006 Winter Olympics. After the Olympics, Wagner worked as an avalanche forecaster for the United States Forest Service. Wagner died on November 6, 2025, at the age of 52, following an 18-month battle with ovarian cancer.

== Cross-country skiing results ==
All results are sourced from the International Ski Federation (FIS).

=== Olympic Games ===
Year	Age	10 km	15 km	Pursuit	30 km	Sprint	4 × 5 km relay	Team sprint
2002	28	36	—	48	23	—	13	—N/a
2006	32	50	—N/a	—	—	35	14	10

=== World Championships ===
Year	Age	5 km	10 km	15 km	Pursuit	30 km	Sprint	4 × 5 km relay	Team sprint
1999	25	69	—N/a	—	56	46	—N/a	14	—N/a
2001	27	—N/a	26	29	47	CNX^{[a]}	44	12	—N/a
2003	29	—N/a	38	32	44	—	42	—	—N/a
2005	31	—N/a	—	—N/a	50	47	23	DNF	—

a. ^{1} Cancelled due to extremely cold weather.

=== World Cup ===
==== Season standings ====
Season	Age				
Season	Age	Overall	Distance	Long Distance	Sprint
1999	25	NC	—N/a	NC	—
2001	27	94	—N/a	—N/a	NC
2002	28	75	—N/a	—N/a	49
2003	29	85	—N/a	—N/a	NC
2004	30	80	66	—N/a	NC
2005	31	96	NC	—N/a	69
2006	32	84	82	—N/a	61
