= Cross-country skiing at the 2002 Winter Olympics – Women's 4 × 5 kilometre relay =

Women's 4 × 5 kilometre relay at the XIX Olympic Winter Games
- Venue: Soldier Hollow
- Dates: 21 February 2002
- Competitors: 52 from 13 nations
- Winning time: 49:30.6

Medalists
1st place, gold medalist(s)		Manuela Henkel; Viola Bauer; Claudia Künzel; Evi Sachenbacher	Germany
2nd place, silver medalist(s)		Marit Bjørgen; Bente Skari; Hilde G. Pedersen; Anita Moen	Norway
3rd place, bronze medalist(s)		Andrea Huber; Laurence Rochat; Brigitte Albrecht-Loretan; Natascia Leonardi Cortesi	Switzerland

The women's 4 × 5 kilometre relay cross-country skiing competition at the 2002 Winter Olympics in Salt Lake City, United States, was held on 19 February at Soldier Hollow.

At Nagano in 1998, the Russians won over the Norwegians, and would have been overwhelming favorites at Salt Lake City but this time were forced to scratch due to positive drug tests from Larissa Lazutina and Olga Danilova.

== Race summary ==
In Russia's absence, Germany took an early lead in the first leg. Switzerland, Slovenia, and Norway trailed after Germany the first leg. Norway went ahead on the second leg, 2.7 seconds ahead of Germany, as they both distanced themselves from Switzerland, which was third. Norway stayed ahead by the third and final exchange, nine seconds over Germany, and another seven seconds ahead of Switzerland. On the anchor leg, Germany's Evi Sachenbacher caught Norway's anchor, Anita Moen, and pulled ahead 100 metres from the finish line to win the gold medal for Germany. Switzerland won the bronze medal.

== Results ==
Each team used four skiers, with each completing racing over the same 5 kilometre circuit. The first two raced in the classical style, and the final pair of skiers raced freestyle.

The race was started at 12:30.

Rank	Bib	Team	Time [min:s]	Deficit
1st place, gold medalist(s)	4	Germany; Manuela Henkel; Viola Bauer; Claudia Künzel; Evi Sachenbacher	49:30.6; 13:01.8; 12:58.0; 11:47.7; 11:43.1	
2nd place, silver medalist(s)	2	Norway; Marit Bjørgen; Bente Skari; Hilde G. Pedersen; Anita Moen	49:31.9; 13:15.9; 12:41.2; 11:41.0; 11:53.8	+1.3
3rd place, bronze medalist(s)	7	Switzerland; Andrea Huber; Laurence Rochat; Brigitte Albrecht-Loretan; Natascia Leonardi Cortesi	50:03.6; 13:08.2; 13:02.7; 11:43.3; 12:09.4	+33.0
4	8	Czech Republic; Helena Balatková; Kamila Rajdlová; Kateřina Neumannová; Kateřina Hanušová	50:35.2; 13:33.6; 13:24.6; 11:26.4; 12:10.6	+1:04.6
5	13	Belarus; Yelena Kalugina; Svetlana Nageykina; Vera Zyatikova; Nataliya Zyatikova	50:37.9; 13:45.1; 12:47.9; 12:11.1; 11:53.8	+1:07.3
6	3	Italy; Marianna Longa; Gabriella Paruzzi; Sabina Valbusa; Stefania Belmondo	50:38.6; 14:14.2; 13:13.2; 11:41.3; 11:29.9	+1:08.0
7	15	Finland; Kati Sundqvist; Satu Salonen; Riitta-Liisa Lassila; Kaisa Varis	50:45.5; 13:48.5; 12:44.8; 12:09.3; 12:02.9	+1:14.9
8	6	Canada; Sara Renner; Milaine Thériault; Amanda Fortier; Beckie Scott	50:49.6; 13:19.8; 13:39.7; 12:10.7; 11:39.4	+1:19.0
9	10	Slovenia; Petra Majdič; Teja Gregorin; Andreja Mali; Nataša Lačen	51:19.6; 13:12.7; 14:04.2; 11:50.5; 12:12.2	+1:49.0
10	12	Japan; Kanoko Goto; Madoka Natsumi; Nobuko Fukuda; Sumiko Yokoyama	51:35.7; 13:35.7; 13:22.9; 12:27.4; 12:09.7	+2:05.1
11	14	Kazakhstan; Svetlana Deshevykh; Yelena Antonova; Oksana Yatskaya; Svetlana Shishkina	51:52.2; 13:53.9; 13:23.2; 12:04.0; 12:31.1	+2:21.6
12	5	Sweden; Lina Andersson; Elin Ek; Jenny Olsson; Anna Dahlberg	52:40.4; 14:09.6; 13:37.0; 12:11.5; 12:42.3	+3:09.8
13	11	United States; Wendy Wagner; Nina Kemppel; Barbara Jones; Aelin Peterson	53:23.4; 14:03.4; 13:49.9; 12:35.2; 12:54.9	+3:52.8
	1	Russia; Olga Danilova; Larisa Lazutina; Nina Gavrylyuk; Yuliya Chepalova	Did not start	
	9	Ukraine; Olena Rodina; Valentyna Shevchenko; Olena Zubrilova; Iryna Terelya	Did not start	
