= Aelin Peterson =

American skier

Personal information
- Born: June 7, 1974 (age 52) Unalakleet, Alaska, United States

Sport
- Sport: Skiing
- Club: Nordic Ski Club of Fairbanks

World Cup career
- Seasons: 2 – (2001, 2003)
- Indiv. starts: 3
- Indiv. podiums: 0
- Team starts: 1
- Team podiums: 0
- Overall titles: 0
- Discipline titles: 0

Aelin Peterson (born June 7, 1974) is an American cross-country skier. She competed in four events at the 2002 Winter Olympics in Salt Lake City, Utah.

== Biography ==
Peterson spent her early life in Unalakleet and Fairbanks in Alaska. She attended West Valley High School and was the Alaska state girls' individual champion (Skimeister) in 1991 and 1992. She attended Northern Michigan University before competing in the Junior Nationals, winning five gold and four silver medals between 1992 and 1998. During this time, the U.S. Ski Association ranked her as the best junior skier in the country on two separate occasions.

In 1996, Peterson worked for Strong Capital Management in Menomonee Falls, Wisconsin. In 2000, she left her job to return to skiing. Before making the US team for the 2002 Winter Olympics, Peterson worked in Milwaukee, Wisconsin as a stock trader. She quit her job in finance to focus on her qualification for the Olympics. She was inducted into the Alaska High School's Hall of Fame in 2006.

In December 2019, Peterson was diagnosed with breast cancer.

== Cross-country skiing results ==
All results are sourced from the International Ski Federation (FIS).

=== Olympic Games ===
| Year | Age | 10 km | 15 km | Pursuit | 30 km | Sprint | 4 × 5 km relay |
|---|---|---|---|---|---|---|---|
| 2002 | 27 | — | — | — | — | 36 | 9 |

=== World Championships ===
| Year | Age | 10 km | 15 km | Pursuit | 30 km | Sprint | 4 × 5 km relay |
|---|---|---|---|---|---|---|---|
| 2003 | 28 | 52 | — | 63 | — | 46 | — |

=== World Cup ===
==== Season standings ====
| Season | Age | | |
| Season | Age | Overall | Sprint |
|---|---|---|---|
| 2001 | 26 | NC | NC |
| 2003 | 28 | NC | NC |
