= Cross-country skiing at the 2002 Winter Olympics – Women's sprint =

Women's sprint at the XIX Olympic Winter Games
- Venue: Soldier Hollow
- Dates: 19 February 2002
- Competitors: 58 from 24 nations

Medalists
1st place, gold medalist(s)		Yuliya Chepalova	Russia
2nd place, silver medalist(s)		Evi Sachenbacher	Germany
3rd place, bronze medalist(s)		Anita Moen	Norway

The Women's sprint cross-country skiing competition at the 2002 Winter Olympics in Salt Lake City, United States, was held on 19 February at Soldier Hollow.

Fifty-eight skiers competed in the qualifying round, of which the 16 fastest competitorai advanced to the final rounds. The 16 competitors who advanced from the qualification were divided into 4 quarterfinal heats of 4 skiers each. The two best competitors in each quarterfinal advanced to the semifinal. The two best competitors in each semifinal advanced to the A Final competing for gold, silver, bronze and fourth place. The two lowest ranked competitors in the semifinal were placed in the B Final, competing for ranks from 5th to 8th position.

== Results ==
Q — qualified for next round

=== Qualifying ===
58 competitors started the qualification race.

Rank	Bib	Athlete	Country	Time	Deficit	Note
1	10	Kateřina Neumannová	Czech Republic	3:12.76		Q
2	13	Yuliya Chepalova	Russia	3:13.03	+0.27	Q
3	2	Evi Sachenbacher	Germany	3:13.81	+1.05	Q
4	16	Anita Moen	Norway	3:14.13	+1.37	Q
5	6	Beckie Scott	Canada	3:14.62	+1.86	Q
6	19	Elina Pienimäki	Finland	3:14.79	+2.03	Q
7	18	Andreja Mali	Slovenia	3:15.75	+2.99	Q
8	4	Gabriella Paruzzi	Italy	3:16.11	+3.35	Q
9	3	Claudia Künzel	Germany	3:16.41	+3.65	Q
10	7	Manuela Henkel	Germany	3:16.89	+4.13	Q
11	9	Maj Helen Sorkmo	Norway	3:17.10	+4.34	Q
12	27	Yelena Burukhina	Russia	3:17.26	+4.50	Q
13	23	Anke Reschwamm Schulze	Germany	3:17.45	+4.69	Q
14	26	Sara Renner	Canada	3:18.07	+5.31	Q
15	5	Lyubov Yegorova	Russia	3:18.46	+5.70	Q
16	30	Madoka Natsumi	Japan	3:18.78	+6.02	Q
17	21	Sabina Valbusa	Italy	3:19.22	+6.46	
18	15	Kati Sundqvist	Finland	3:19.23	+6.47	
19	20	Hilde Gjermundshaug Pedersen	Norway	3:19.79	+7.03	
20	1	Nina Gavrylyuk	Russia	3:20.02	+7.26	
21	12	Vibeke Skofterud	Norway	3:20.21	+7.45	
22	8	Magda Genuin	Italy	3:20.28	+7.52	
23	25	Kaisa Varis	Finland	3:20.52	+7.76	
24	35	Viktoria Lopatina	Belarus	3:20.59	+7.83	
25	14	Kristina Šmigun	Estonia	3:20.94	+8.18	
26	11	Karin Moroder	Italy	3:21.92	+9.16	
27	24	Andrea Huber	Switzerland	3:22.18	+9.42	
28	17	Lina Andersson	Sweden	3:22.65	+9.89	
29	32	Iryna Terelya	Ukraine	3:23.47	+10.71	
30	51	Jaime Fortier	Canada	3:23.98	+11.22	
31	29	Milaine Thériault	Canada	3:24.41	+11.65	
32	33	Natasa Lacen	Slovenia	3:24.90	+12.14	
33	22	Anna Dahlberg	Sweden	3:25.32	+12.56	
34	31	Teja Gregorin	Slovenia	3:25.64	+12.88	
35	34	Elin Ek	Sweden	3:25.93	+13.17	
36	28	Riitta-Liisa Lassila	Finland	3:27.16	+14.40	
37	44	Anna-Carin Olofsson	Sweden	3:28.07	+15.31	
38	39	Tessa Benoit	United States	3:28.35	+15.59	
39	38	Nobuko Fukuda	Japan	3:28.38	+15.62	
40	49	Hou Yuxia	China	3:28.71	+15.95	
41	40	Vita Yakymchuk	Ukraine	3:28.94	+16.18	
42	36	Helena Balatková	Czech Republic	3:29.23	+16.47	
43	53	Ilona Bublová	Czech Republic	3:29.35	+16.59	
44	41	Kikkan Randall	United States	3:30.27	+17.51	
45	43	Nataliya Sviridova-Kalinovskaya	Belarus	3:31.83	+19.07	
46	42	Aelin Peterson	United States	3:34.05	+21.29	
47	47	Tomomi Otaka	Japan	3:34.14	+21.38	
48	48	Irina Terentjeva	Lithuania	3:34.18	+21.42	
48	45	Kristina Joder	United States	3:34.18	+21.42	
50	46	Luan Zhengrong	China	3:35.21	+22.45	
51	37	Natalya Issachenko	Kazakhstan	3:39.09	+26.33	
52	52	Lee Chun-ja	South Korea	3:41.06	+28.30	
53	55	Daria Starostina	Kazakhstan	3:41.69	+28.93	
54	50	Zsofia Gottschall	Hungary	3:42.98	+30.22	
55	56	Elena Gorohova	Moldova	3:43.82	+31.06	
56	58	Kelime Çetinkaya	Turkey	4:00.50	+47.74	
57	57	Katerina Balkaba	Greece	4:06.99	+54.23	
58	54	Margarit Nikolyan	Armenia	4:13.5	+1:00.79	

=== Quarterfinal ===
The 16 competitors who advanced to the final rounds received new bibs which indicated their ranking in the qualification.

Quarterfinal 1

Rank	Seed	Athlete	Country	Time	Deficit	Note
1	9	Claudia Künzel	Germany	3:15.1	—	Q
2	8	Gabriella Paruzzi	Italy	3:16.2	+1.1	Q
3	16	Madoka Natsumi	Japan	3:17.5	+2.4	
4	1	Kateřina Neumannová	Czech Republic	3:18.9	+3.8	

Quarterfinal 2

Rank	Seed	Athlete	Country	Time	Deficit	Note
1	5	Beckie Scott	Canada	3:15.8	—	Q
2	4	Anita Moen	Norway	3:15.9	+0.1	Q
3	13	Anke Reschwam Schulze	Germany	3:15.9	+0.1	
4	12	Yelena Burukhina	Russia	3:19.3	+3.5	

Quarterfinal 3

Rank	Seed	Athlete	Country	Time	Deficit	Note
1	7	Andreja Mali	Slovenia	3:14.8	—	Q
2	2	Yuliya Chepalova	Russia	3:14.9	+0.1	Q
3	15	Lyubov Yegorova	Russia	3:16.0	+1.2	
4	10	Manuela Henkel	Germany	3:16.3	+1.5	

Quarterfinal 4

Rank	Seed	Athlete	Country	Time	Deficit	Note
1	3	Evi Sachenbacher	Germany	3:40.2	—	Q
2	14	Sara Renner	Canada	3:42.4	+2.2	Q
3	11	Maj Helen Sorkmo	Norway	3:44.2	+4.0	ADV
4	6	Elina Pienimäki	Finland	4:01.5	+21.3	

=== Semifinals ===
Semifinal 1

Rank	Seed	Athlete	Country	Time	Deficit	Note
1	4	Anita Moen	Norway	3:23.8	—	QA
2	9	Claudia Künzel	Germany	3:24.5	+0.7	QA
3	8	Gabriella Paruzzi	Italy	3:25.3	+1.5	QB
4	5	Beckie Scott	Canada	3:25.4	+1.6	QB

Semifinal 2

Rank	Seed	Athlete	Country	Time	Deficit	Note
1	2	Yuliya Chepalova	Russia	3:18.2	—	QA
2	3	Evi Sachenbacher	Germany	3:18.5	+0.3	QA
3	11	Maj Helen Sorkmo	Norway	3:19.4	+1.2	QB
4	7	Andreja Mali	Slovenia	3:19.8	+1.6	QB
5	14	Sara Renner	Canada	3:20.0	+1.8	

=== Finals ===
Final B

Rank	Seed	Athlete	Country	Time	Deficit	Note
5	5	Beckie Scott	Canada	3:24.9	—	
6	11	Maj Helen Sorkmo	Norway	3:25.5	+0.6	
7	7	Andreja Mali	Slovenia	3:25.9	+1.0	
8	8	Gabriella Paruzzi	Italy	3:26.1	+1.2	

Final A

Rank	Seed	Athlete	Country	Time	Deficit	Note
1st place, gold medalist(s)	2	Yuliya Chepalova	Russia	3:10.6	—	
2nd place, silver medalist(s)	3	Evi Sachenbacher	Germany	3:12.2	+1.6	
3rd place, bronze medalist(s)	4	Anita Moen	Norway	3:12.7	+2.1	
4	9	Claudia Künzel	Germany	3:13.3	+2.7	
