= Jaime Fortier =

Canadian cross-country skier

Personal information
- Nationality: Canada
- Born: 23 February 1976 (age 50)

Sport
- Sport: Skiing
- Club: Edmonton Nordic Ski Club

World Cup career
- Seasons: 6 – (1996–1998, 2000–2002)
- Indiv. starts: 28
- Indiv. podiums: 0
- Team starts: 5
- Team podiums: 0
- Overall titles: 0 – (78th in 2001)
- Discipline titles: 0

Jaime Fortier (born 23 February 1976) is a Canadian former cross-country skier who competed in the 1998 Winter Olympics and in the 2002 Winter Olympics.

== Cross-country skiing results ==
All results are sourced from the International Ski Federation (FIS).

=== Olympic Games ===
Year	Age	5 km	10 km	15 km	Pursuit	30 km	Sprint	4 × 5 km relay
1998	22	77	—N/a	DNS	DNS	DNS	—N/a	16
2002	26	—N/a	45	37	—	34	30	—

=== World Championships ===
Year	Age	5 km	10 km	15 km	Pursuit	30 km	Sprint	4 × 5 km relay
1997	21	—	—N/a	59	—	52	—N/a	14
2001	25	—N/a	DNS	50	35	CNX^{[a]}	—	6

a. ^{1} Cancelled due to extremely cold weather.

=== World Cup ===
==== Season standings ====
Season	Age				
Season	Age	Overall	Long Distance	Middle Distance	Sprint
1996	20	NC	—N/a	—N/a	—N/a
1997	21	NC	NC	—N/a	—
1998	22	NC	NC	—N/a	—
2000	24	90	61	NC	NC
2001	25	78	—N/a	—N/a	66
2002	26	96	—N/a	—N/a	NC
