= Franziska Becskehazy =

Brazilian cross-country skier (born 1966)

Personal information
- Born: 7 February 1966 (age 59); Rio de Janeiro, Brazil

Sport
- Sport: Cross-country skiing

Franziska Becskehazy (born 7 February 1966) is a Brazilian cross-country skier. She competed in the women's 10 kilometre classical at the 2002 Winter Olympics.
