= Kati Wilhelm =

German former professional biathlete (born 1976)

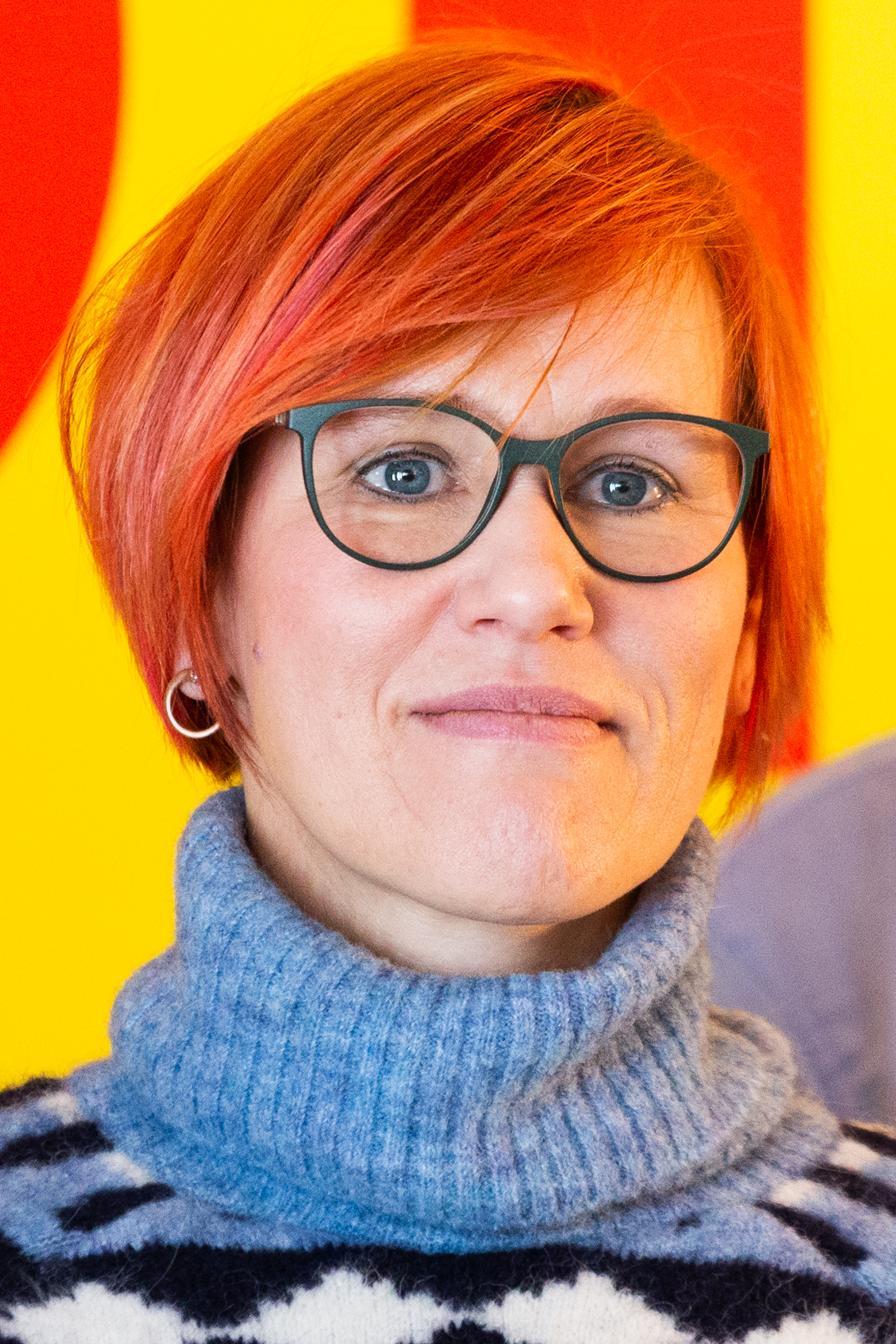
- Wilhelm in 2018

Medal record

Women's biathlon

Representing Germany

Olympic Games
Gold medal – first place	2002 Salt Lake City	7.5 km sprint
Gold medal – first place	2002 Salt Lake City	4 × 7.5 km relay
Gold medal – first place	2006 Turin	10 km pursuit
Silver medal – second place	2002 Salt Lake City	10 km pursuit
Silver medal – second place	2006 Turin	12.5 km mass start
Silver medal – second place	2006 Turin	4 × 6 km relay
Bronze medal – third place	2010 Vancouver	4 × 6 km relay

World Championships
Gold medal – first place	2001 Pokljuka	7.5 km sprint
Gold medal – first place	2007 Antholz-Anterselva	4 × 6 km relay
Gold medal – first place	2008 Östersund	4 × 6 km relay
Gold medal – first place	2009 Pyeongchang	15 km individual
Gold medal – first place	2009 Pyeongchang	7.5 km sprint
Silver medal – second place	2001 Pokljuka	4 × 7.5 km relay
Silver medal – second place	2005 Hochfilzen	4 × 6 km relay
Silver medal – second place	2009 Pyeongchang	10 km pursuit
Silver medal – second place	2009 Pyeongchang	4 × 6 km relay
Bronze medal – third place	2003 Khanty-Mansiysk	4 × 6 km relay
Bronze medal – third place	2004 Oberhof	4 × 6 km relay
Bronze medal – third place	2005 Khanty-Mansiysk	Mixed relay
Bronze medal – third place	2007 Antholz-Anterselva	12.5 km mass start

Kati Wilhelm (German pronunciation: [ˈkaːti ˈvɪlhɛlm]; born 2 August 1976) is a German former professional biathlete. Like most German biathletes she is also a member of the German Armed Forces (Bundeswehr) with the rank of master sergeant (Hauptfeldwebel). Wilhelm resides in Steinbach-Hallenberg, in the Federal State of Thuringia.

== Career ==
Wilhelm was born in Schmalkalden, then East Germany (now in the Federal State of Thuringia, Germany). She started training cross-country skiing as a child in 1983 and was a member of the German cross-country ski team at the 1998 Nagano Olympic Games. In 1999, while attending the Military World Games, she came into contact with biathlon and was hooked on the sport. Her decision to switch to biathlon proved to be a good one. The next year she experienced her first successes including a World Cup victory. During the Salt Lake City Olympic Games in, she was the most decorated female biathlete, winning gold medals in the 7.5 km sprint and the 4 × 6 km relay. She also won a silver medal in the 10 km pursuit. After two years of struggling, she finally moved to Ruhpolding, Bavaria in 2004. She regained her strength and placed second in the 2004–05 World Cup season, defeated only by Frenchwoman Sandrine Bailly. At the 2006 Winter Olympics in Turin, she carried the German flag at the opening ceremony. After winning her third Olympic gold medal in the 10 km pursuit as well as silver in the mass start and with the German relay, she became the best female biathlete at the Olympics ever. Moreover, she dominated the 2005–06 World Cup season, winning six races and the overall World Cup trophy. She was elected "biathlete of the year 2006" as well as "German sportswoman of the year 2006". In total she has 21 IBU Biathlon World Cup wins.

In the 2006–07 World Cup season, she finished second for the overall World Cup title behind teammate Andrea Henkel. In the 2008–09 World Cup season, she finished second for the overall World Cup title behind Helena Jonsson, with both biathletes scoring 952 points. Jonsson was awarded the overall title by virtue of her four World Cup victories against Wilhelm's three.

The German media gave her the nickname "Rotkäppchen" (Little Red Riding Hood) because of her characteristic red hair and the red cap she uses in competition. She was able to translate her Olympic victories into multiple endorsement deals, including print and television advertising. Wilhelm announced her retirement from biathlon on 9 March 2010 so that she could focus on her studies. She took part in the International biathlon competition on the "Prize in memory of Vitaly Fatyanov", Kamchatka 2010. The event was held in Kamchatka, Russia on 15–17 April, where Kati came 3rd in Sprint and won a Pursuit race.

In 2004, Wilhelm was a delegate to the Federal Convention for the Social Democrats.

Wilhelm retired as an athlete after the 2009–10 season.

== Biathlon achievements ==
- Biathlon World Cup
  - 1 × overall winner (2005–06)
  - 3 × overall runner-up (2004–05, 2006–07, 2008–09)
  - 21 individual victories

== Cross-country skiing results ==
All results are sourced from the International Ski Federation (FIS).

=== Olympic Games ===
Year	Age	5 km	15 km	Pursuit	30 km	4 × 5 km relay
1998	22	26	—	32	16	5

=== World Championships ===
Year	Age	5 km	15 km	Pursuit	30 km	4 × 5 km relay
1997	21	—	24	—	51	6
1999	23	—	21	—	—	—

=== World Cup ===
==== Season standings ====
Season	Age			
Season	Age	Overall	Long Distance	Sprint
1995	19	NC	—N/a	—N/a
1996	20	NC	—N/a	—N/a
1997	21	53	49	50
1998	22	41	NC	35
1999	23	34	29	43

== See also ==
- Germany at the 2006 Winter Olympics

Awards
Preceded by Uschi Disl	German Sportswoman of the Year; 2006	Succeeded by Magdalena Neuner
