= You Yanchun =

Chinese speed skater

Personal information
- Nationality: Chinese
- Born: 10 February 1976 (age 50) Jilin, China

Sport
- Sport: Speed skating

You Yanchun (born 10 February 1976) is a Chinese speed skater. She competed in the women's 1000 metres at the 2002 Winter Olympics.
