= Annie Driscoll =

American speed skater

Annie (Driscoll) Pearson
Personal information
- Born: August 30, 1978 (age 46); Saint Paul, Minnesota, United States

Sport
- Sport: Speed skating

Annie Driscoll (born August 30, 1978) is an American speed skater. She competed in two events at the 2002 Winter Olympics.
