= Amy Sannes =

American speed skater

Amy Elizabeth Sannes (born February 3, 1977, in St. Paul, Minnesota) is an Olympic speed skater who competed in the 1998 Winter Olympics, 2002 Winter Olympics and 2006 Winter Olympics.

She graduated in 2004 from the University of Utah with a degree in exercise physiology.

Personal records
Women's speed skating
Event	Result	Date	Location	Notes
500 m	38.61	2005-12-27	Salt Lake City, Utah	
1000 m	1:15.09	2002-02-17	Salt Lake City, Utah	
1500 m	1:55.59	2002-02-03	Salt Lake City, Utah	
3000 m	4:20.81	2001-12-21	Salt Lake City, Utah	
5000 m	8:12.60	1996-11-10	Milwaukee, Wisconsin	
