= Cross-country skiing at the 2002 Winter Olympics – Women's 30 kilometre classical =

Women’s 30 kilometre classical at the XIX Olympic Winter Games
- Venue: Soldier Hollow
- Dates: 24 February 2002
- Competitors: 50 from 17 nations
- Winning time: 1:30:57.1

Medalists
1st place, gold medalist(s)		Gabriella Paruzzi	Italy
2nd place, silver medalist(s)		Stefania Belmondo	Italy
3rd place, bronze medalist(s)		Bente Skari	Norway

The Women's 30 kilometre classical interval start cross-country skiing competition at the 2002 Winter Olympics in Salt Lake City, United States, was held on 24 February at Soldier Hollow. This was the final women's event of the 2002 Olympics cross-country program.

All skiers started at 30 second intervals, skiing the entire 30 kilometre course.

== The race ==
The early leader in this race was Russian Larisa Lazutina, the 1999 World Champion and 2001 Holmenkollen champion in the event. She won the race by almost two minutes over Italian Gabriella Paruzzi. Lazutina led at every checkpoint and had the fastest intermediate split for each time check. Stefania Belmondo of Italy finished third and Norwegian Bente Skari finished in fourth place.

After the competition, it was confirmed that Lazutina had tested positive for darpopoietin, an erythropoietin analogue, and was disqualified from all events in the 2002 Winter Olympics. Her teammate, Olga Danilova, who had originally finished eighth, had been sanctioned for doping two months earlier and was also disqualified. This brought Paruzzi up to gold medal, her first individual olympic medal. The silver medalist became Italy's Stefania Belmondo while Skari won the bronze.

For Belmondo this was her 10th Olympic medal, equaling the Winter Olympic record for women held by Soviet/Unified Team skier Raisa Smetanina, both trailing only Norway's Bjørn Dæhlie, who won 12.

== Results ==
The race was started at 09:30.

Rank	Bib	Name	Country	Time	Deficit
1st place, gold medalist(s)	53	Gabriella Paruzzi	Italy	1:30:57.1	
2nd place, silver medalist(s)	48	Stefania Belmondo	Italy	1:31:01.6	+4.5
3rd place, bronze medalist(s)	44	Bente Skari	Norway	1:31:36.3	+39.2
4	51	Anita Moen	Norway	1:31:37.3	+40.2
5	41	Valentyna Shevchenko	Ukraine	1:33:03.1	+2:06.0
6	42	Viola Bauer	Germany	1:33:25.1	+2:28.0
7	49	Kristina Šmigun	Estonia	1:33:52.7	+2:55.6
8	40	Vibeke Skofterud	Norway	1:35:02.3	+4:05.2
9	47	Yuliya Chepalova	Russia	1:35:37.4	+4:40.3
10	24	Natascia Leonardi Cortesi	Switzerland	1:35:46.8	+4:49.7
11	45	Svetlana Nageykina	Belarus	1:35:51.6	+4:54.5
12	50	Petra Majdič	Slovenia	1:35:51.8	+4:54.7
13	36	Katrin Šmigun	Estonia	1:37:02.6	+5:06.9
14	34	Marit Bjørgen	Norway	1:37:02.6	+6:05.5
15	27	Nina Kemppel	United States	1:37:08.7	+6:11.6
16	35	Svetlana Shishkina	Kazakhstan	1:37:14.5	+6:17.4
17	38	Oxana Yatskaya	Kazakhstan	1:37:25.3	+6:28.2
18	22	Iryna Terelya	Ukraine	1:37:32.9	+6:35.8
19	29	Antonella Confortola	Italy	1:37:47.4	+6:50.3
19	39	Olga Zavyalova	Russia	1:37:47.4	+6:50.3
21	19	Laurence Rochat	Switzerland	1:38:24.2	+7:27.1
22	21	Sumiko Yokoyama	Japan	1:39:48.8	+8:51.7
23	31	Wendy Kay Wagner	United States	1:39:54.8	+8:57.7
24	16	Annmari Viljanmaa	Finland	1:40:47.9	+9:50.8
25	33	Elin Ek	Sweden	1:40:48.2	+9:51.1
26	32	Madoka Natumi	Japan	1:41:06.0	+10:08.9
27	23	Kamila Rajdlová	Czech Republic	1:41:57.7	+11:00.6
28	13	Amanda Fortier	Canada	1:42:08.1	+11:11.0
29	15	Nataliya Zyatikova	Belarus	1:42:18.0	+11:20.9
30	37	Irina Skripnik	Belarus	1:42:49.1	+11:52.0
31	28	Milaine Thériault	Canada	1:42:56.9	+11:59.8
32	10	Elena Antonova	Kazakhstan	1:43:37.6	+12:40.5
33	12	Marianna Longa	Italy	1:44:02.5	+13:05.4
34	30	Jaime Fortier	Canada	1:44:26.2	+13:29.1
35	14	Barbara Jones	United States	1:45:18.7	+14:21.6
36	17	Midori Furusawa	Japan	1:45:50.0	+14:52.9
37	3	Svetlana Deshevykh	Kazakhstan	1:46:18.1	+15:21.0
38	9	Olena Rodina	Ukraine	1:46:51.2	+15:54.1
39	25	Anna Dahlberg	Sweden	1:46:51.3	+15:54.2
40	11	Kateřina Hanušová	Czech Republic	1:48:52.6	+17:55.5
41	5	Luan Zhengrong	China	1:49:37.7	+18:40.6
42	20	Hou Yuxia	China	1:49:45.8	+18:48.7
43	7	Tomomi Otaka	Japan	1:50:00.3	+19:03.2
	2	Maryna Pestryakova	Ukraine	Did not finish	
	6	Anna-Carin Olofsson	Sweden	Did not finish	
	18	Ulrika Persson	Sweden	Did not finish	
	26	Satu Salonen	Finland	Did not finish	
	52	Manuela Henkel	Germany	Did not finish	
	1	Sara Renner	Canada	Did not start	
	4	Aelin Peterson	United States	Did not start	
	8	Vera Zyatikova	Belarus	Did not start	
DSQ	46	Larisa Lazutina	Russia	~~1:29:09.0~~	
DSQ	43	Olga Danilova	Russia	~~1:33:44.1~~	
