= Maja Kezele =

Croatian cross-country skier (born 1979)

Personal information
- Nationality: Croatian
- Born: 31 July 1979 (age 45); Rijeka, Yugoslavia

Sport
- Sport: Cross-country skiing

Maja Kezele (born 31 July 1979) is a Croatian cross-country skier. She competed at the 2002 Winter Olympics and the 2006 Winter Olympics.
