= Brian Welch (ski jumper) =

American ski jumper (born 1984)

Brian Welch (born January 18, 1984) is an American former ski jumper who competed at the 2002 Winter Olympics.
