= Mami Shindo-Honma =

Japanese biathlete (born 1975)

Personal information
- Nationality: Japanese
- Born: 22 February 1975 (age 50)

Sport
- Sport: Biathlon

Mami Shindo-Honma (進藤-本間 真美, Shindō-Honma Mami, born 22 February 1975) is a Japanese biathlete. She competed at the 1998 Winter Olympics and the 2002 Winter Olympics.
