= Margarita Nikolyan =

Armenian cross-country skier (born 1974)

Personal information
- Nationality: Armenian
- Born: 27 May 1974 (age 50); Gyumri, Soviet Union

Sport
- Sport: Cross-country skiing

Margarita Nikolyan (born 27 May 1974) is an Armenian cross-country skier. She competed in four events at the 2002 Winter Olympics.
