= Hiromi Seino-Suga =

Japanese biathlete (born 1973)

Personal information
- Nationality: Japanese
- Born: 28 November 1973 (age 51)

Sport
- Sport: Biathlon

Hiromi Seino-Suga (清野-菅 弘美, Seino-Suga Hiromi, born 28 November 1973) is a Japanese biathlete. She competed at the 1998 Winter Olympics and the 2002 Winter Olympics.
