= Ryoko Takahashi =

Japanese biathlete (born 1973)

Personal information
- Nationality: Japanese
- Born: 29 August 1973 (age 51); Mamurogawa, Yamagata, Japan

Sport
- Sport: Biathlon

Ryoko Takahashi (高橋 涼子, Takahashi Ryōko, born 29 August 1973) is a Japanese biathlete. She competed at the 1998 Winter Olympics and the 2002 Winter Olympics.
