= Yevgeniya Kutsepalova =

Belarusian biathlete (born 1978)

Personal information
- Nationality: Belarusian
- Born: 7 June 1978 (age 46)

Sport
- Sport: Biathlon

Yevgeniya Kutsepalova (born 7 June 1978) is a Belarusian biathlete. She competed in three events at the 2002 Winter Olympics.
