= Kanoko Goto =

Japanese cross-country skier (born 1975)

Personal information
- Nationality: Japanese
- Born: 23 August 1975 (age 49); Niigata, Japan

Sport
- Sport: Cross-country skiing

Kanoko Goto (後藤 鹿子, Gotō Kanoko, born 23 August 1975) is a Japanese cross-country skier. She competed in four events at the 2002 Winter Olympics.
