= Outi Kettunen =

Finnish biathlete (born 1978)

Personal information
- Full name: Outi Petra Maria Kettunen
- Nationality: Finnish
- Born: 8 March 1978 (age 47)

Sport
- Sport: Biathlon

Outi Petra Maria Kettunen-Walter (née Kettunen; born 8 March 1978) is a Finnish biathlete. She competed in the four events at the 2002 Winter Olympics.

In 2000, Kettunen received a two-year ban from competition due to testing positive for nandrolone. The ban was later cut to one year, ending in September 2001.

Kettunen-Walter works for a sports company in Switzerland.
