= Katja Holanti =

Finnish biathlete

Personal information
- Full name: Katja Minna Marita Holanti
- Nationality: Finnish
- Born: 5 April 1974 (age 50); Vehkalahti, Finland
- Height: 5 ft 5 1/2 in (166 cm)
- Weight: 137 lb (62 kg)

Sport
- Sport: Biathlon

Katja Minna Marita Holanti (born 5 April 1974) is a Finnish biathlete. She competed at the 1994, 1998 and the 2002 Winter Olympics.
