= Andrea Nahrgang =

American biathlete (born 1978)

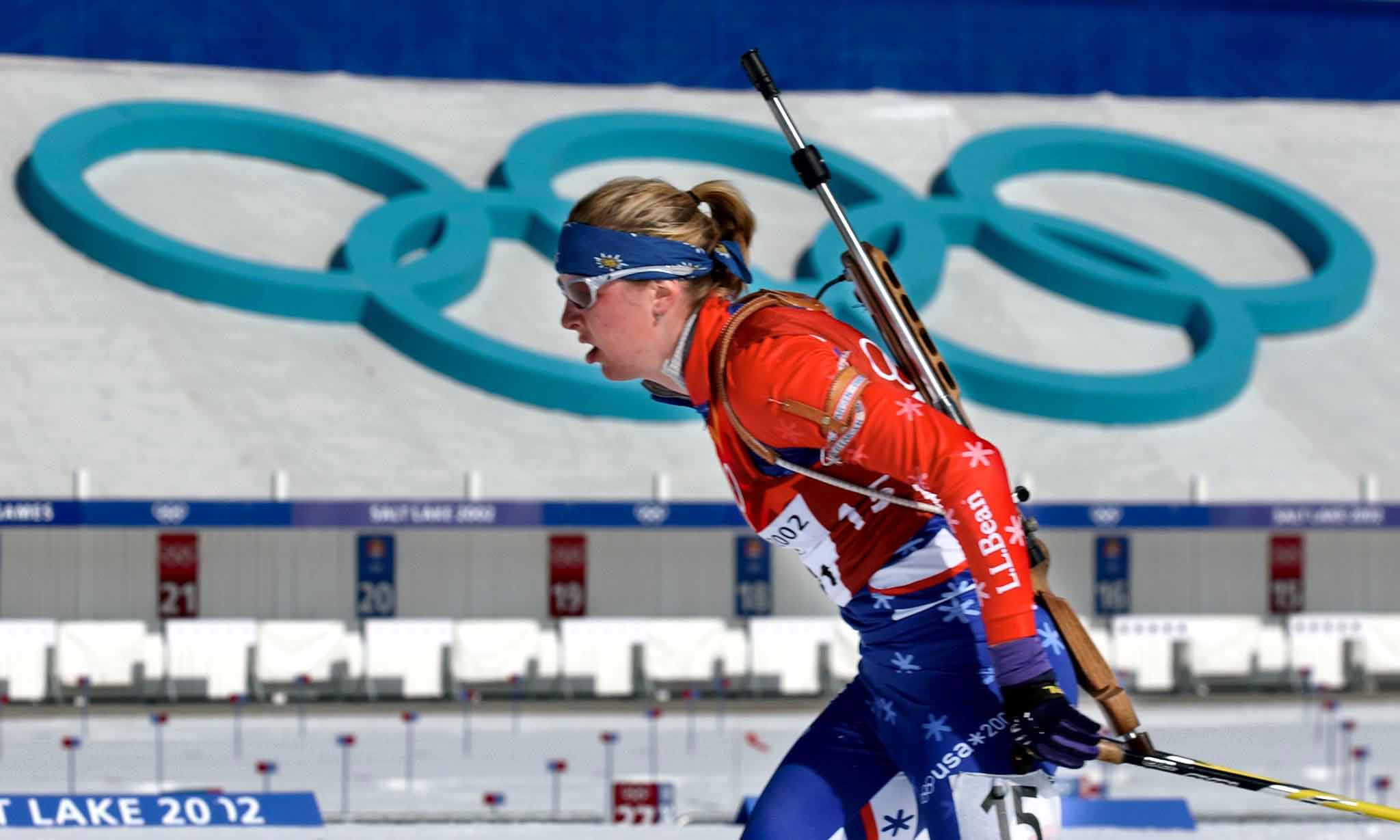
- Andrea Nahrgang in 2002

Personal information
- Born: February 20, 1978 (age 48) Wayzata, Minnesota, United States

Sport
- Sport: Biathlon

Andrea Nahrgang (born February 20, 1978) is an American biathlete. She competed in three events at the 2002 Winter Olympics.
