= Nataliya Zyatikova =

Belarusian skier (born 1974)

Personal information
- Nationality: Belarusian
- Born: 5 May 1974 (age 50); Kemerovo, Russian SFSR, Soviet Union

Sport
- Sport: Cross-country skiing

Nataliya Zyatikova (born 5 May 1974) is a Belarusian cross-country skier. She competed in five events at the 2002 Winter Olympics.
