= Kara Salmela =

American biathlete (born 1972)

Personal information
- Born: June 16, 1972 (age 53) Elk River, Minnesota, United States

Sport
- Sport: Biathlon

Kara Salmela (born June 16, 1972) is an American biathlete. She competed at the 1998 Winter Olympics and the 2002 Winter Olympics.
