= Olena Rodina =

Ukrainian cross-country skier (born 1975)

Personal information
- Nationality: Ukrainian
- Born: 17 May 1975 (age 49)

Sport
- Sport: Cross-country skiing

Olena Rodina (born 17 May 1975) is a Ukrainian cross-country skier. She competed in three events at the 2002 Winter Olympics.
