= Rachel Steer =

American biathlete (born 1978)

Personal information
- Born: January 25, 1978 (age 47); Anchorage, Alaska, United States

Sport
- Sport: Biathlon

Rachel Steer (born January 25, 1978) is an American biathlete. She competed at the 2002 Winter Olympics and the 2006 Winter Olympics without winning a medal.
