= Iryna Taranenko-Terelya =

Ukrainian cross-country skier (born 1966)

Medal record

Women's cross-country skiing

Representing Ukraine

World Championships
Bronze medal – third place	1999 Ramsau	15 km combined pursuit

Winter Universiade
Gold medal – first place	1993 Zakopane	Relay

Iryna Leonidivna Taranenko-Terelya (Ukrainian: Ірина Леонідівна Тараненко-Тереля, born 31 March 1966) is a former Ukrainian cross-country skier who competed from 1992 to 2004. She won a bronze medal in the 5 km + 10 km combined pursuit at the 1999 FIS Nordic World Ski Championships in Ramsau. She was the first woman to represent Ukraine at the Olympics.

Taranenko's best individual finish at the Winter Olympics was 4th twice at Nagano in 1998 (5 km + 10 km combined pursuit, 15 km). She also earned seven individual career victories from 1996 to 2000.
