= List of 2002 Winter Olympics medal winners =

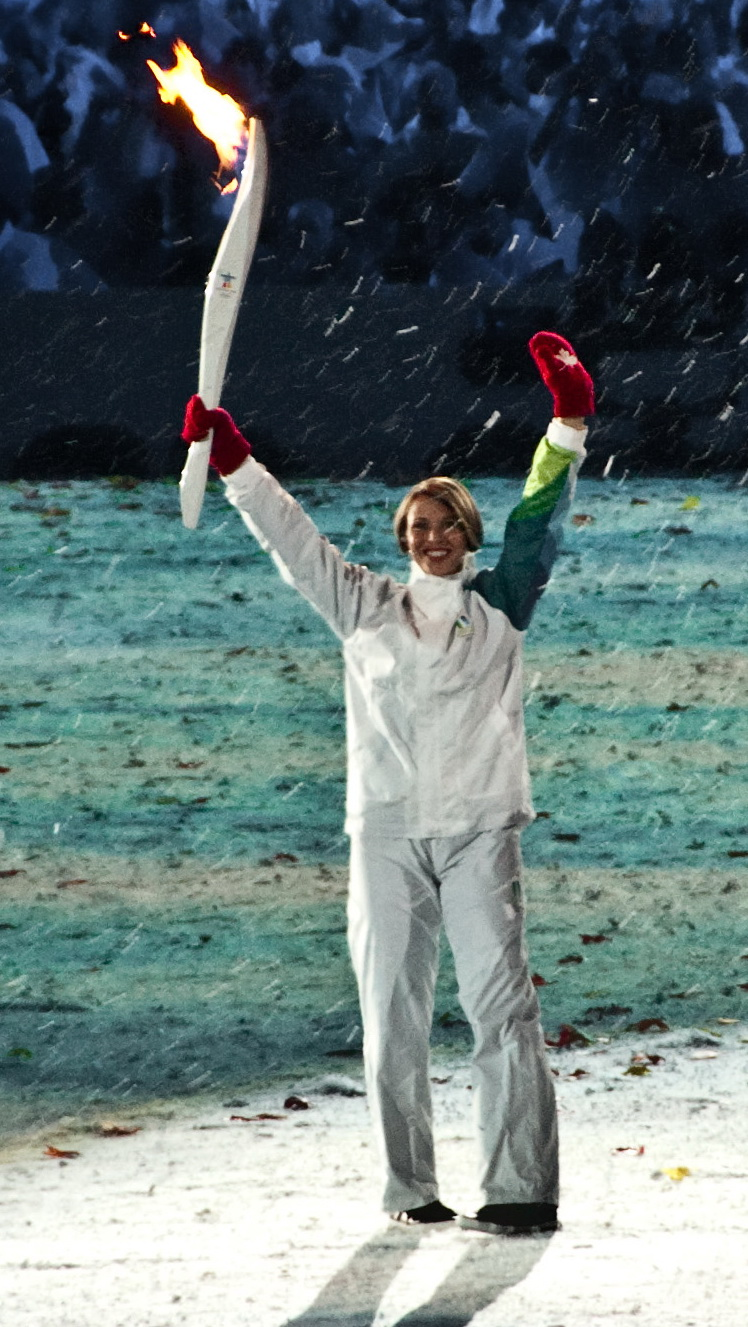
Catriona Le May Doan of Canada won her final Olympic medal in Salt Lake City. Eight years later, she was one of the final torch-bearers when the Winter Olympics were held in Vancouver.

The 2002 Winter Olympics, officially known by the International Olympic Committee as the XIX Olympic Winter Games, was an international multi-sport event held in Salt Lake City, Utah, United States, from 8 February through 24 February 2002. A total of 2399 athletes from 77 National Olympic Committees (NOCs) participated at the Games in 78 events across 15 disciplines.

New events were contested in these Games; skeleton (introduced for the first time at the 1928 Winter Olympics and not contested since 1948) was re-introduced with events for both men and women, while women's bobsleigh was added to the program. The 78 events in Salt Lake City were an increase from 68 in Nagano at the 1998 Winter Olympics. Both men and women competed at these Games.

A total of 407 athletes won at least one medal at the Games. Athletes from Norway topped the medal table with the most gold medals, winning 13 golds out of 25 total medals. Germany won the most medals overall with 36, of which 12 were gold. Host nation the United States won 34 medals, 10 of them gold. Athletes from 24 participating NOCs won at least one medal; and competitors from 18 won at least one gold medal. Athletes from Australia and China won their respective nations' first Winter Olympic gold medals, while the Croatian and Estonian delegations each won their first Winter Olympic medals of any color. Of the 407 medalists, 55 athletes won more than one medal of any color at the Games. Of the multiple medalists, 31 won at least one gold medal, and 13 won multiple gold medals.

A judging scandal in the pairs figure skating event, where it was revealed that a French judge had been bribed to inflate the scores of the Russian pair, led to the declaration of joint Olympic champions in the pairs event. Georg Hackl of Germany finished in second in the men's luge singles event, becoming the first athlete to win a medal at five consecutive Games in the same individual event. The United States teams, in the four-man bobsleigh event, won the country's first bobsleigh medals in 46 years. The 2002 Games also saw the first Winter Olympics gold medalists of African origin: Vonetta Flowers of the United States in the women's bobsleigh event, and Canada's Jarome Iginla in men's ice hockey. The Games saw improved doping testing conditions; four medalists (three from Russia and one from Spain) were stripped of their medals as a result of doping disqualifications. Ole Einar Bjørndalen was the Games' most decorated athlete, winning four gold medals; Janica Kostelić was the best-performing female athlete with three golds and a silver medal. Finnish athlete Samppa Lajunen became the first person to win three Nordic combined gold medals at a single Olympics, while Simon Ammann of Switzerland, who had not won a FIS Ski Jumping World Cup event before the Games, was the surprise performer, winning the gold medal on both the normal and large hills.

== Alpine skiing ==
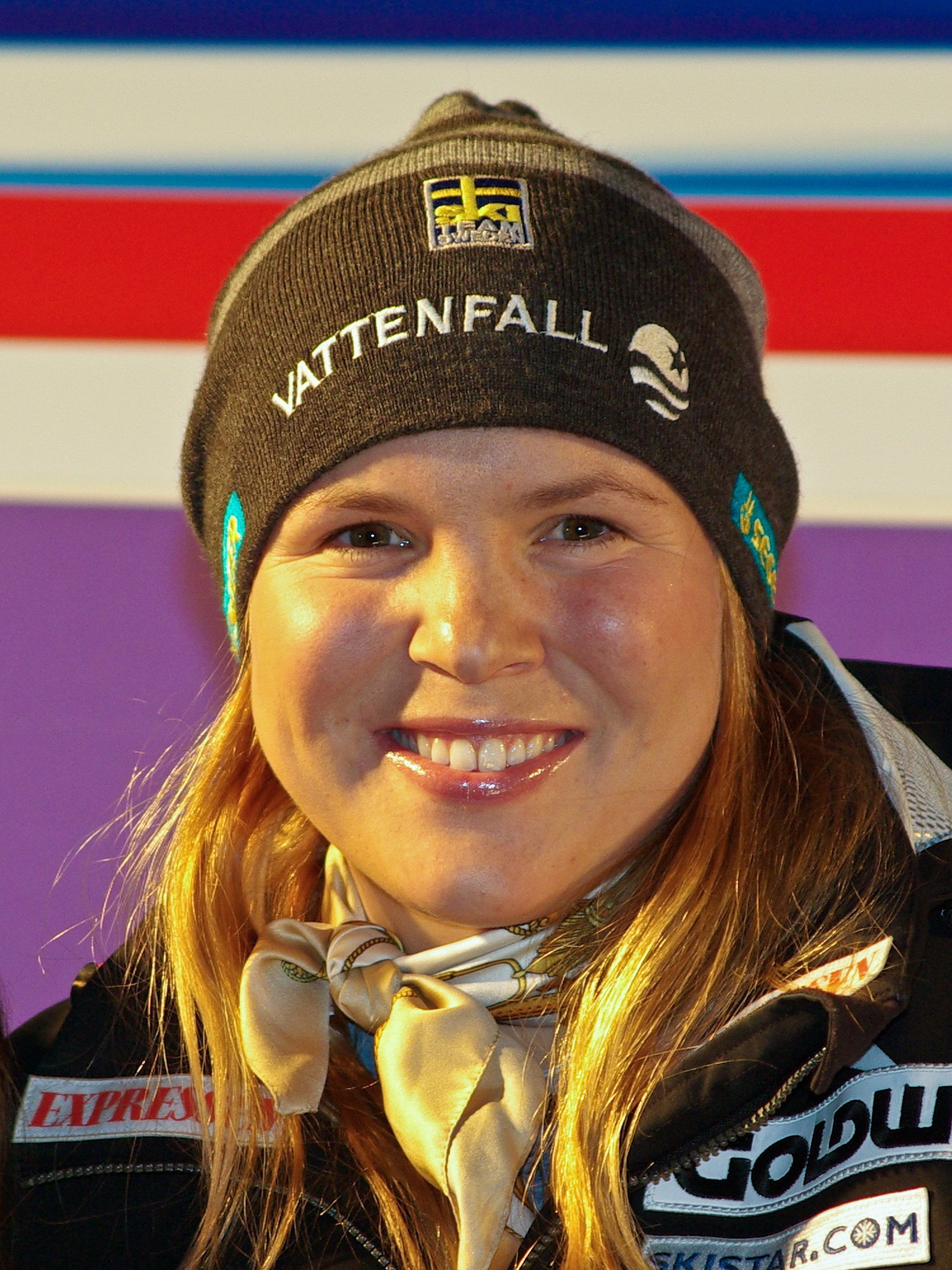
Anja Pärson won the first two of her six career Winter Olympics medals in Salt Lake City.

Event	Gold	Silver	Bronze
Men's downhill	Fritz Strobl; Austria	Lasse Kjus; Norway	Stephan Eberharter; Austria
Men's combined	Kjetil André Aamodt; Norway	Bode Miller; United States	Benjamin Raich; Austria
Men's Super-G	Kjetil André Aamodt; Norway	Stephan Eberharter; Austria	Andreas Schifferer; Austria
Men's giant slalom	Stephan Eberharter; Austria	Bode Miller; United States	Lasse Kjus; Norway
Men's slalom	Jean-Pierre Vidal; France	Sébastien Amiez; France	Benjamin Raich; Austria^{[A]}
Women's downhill	Carole Montillet; France	Isolde Kostner; Italy	Renate Götschl; Austria
Women's combined	Janica Kostelić; Croatia	Renate Götschl; Austria	Martina Ertl; Germany
Women's Super-G	Daniela Ceccarelli; Italy	Janica Kostelić; Croatia	Karen Putzer; Italy
Women's slalom	Janica Kostelić; Croatia	Laure Pequegnot; France	Anja Pärson; Sweden
Women's giant slalom	Janica Kostelić; Croatia	Anja Pärson; Sweden	Sonja Nef; Switzerland

== Biathlon ==
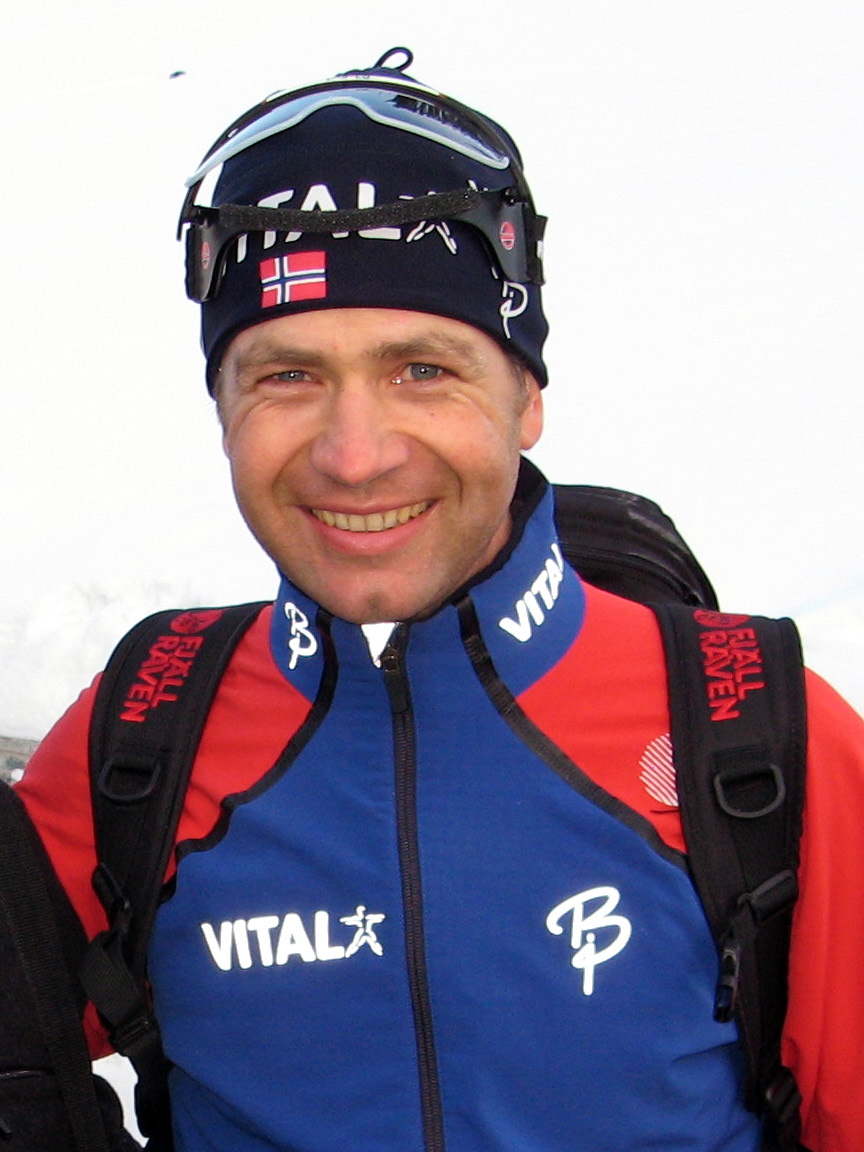
Ole Einar Bjørndalen, a biathlete in the Norwegian delegation, won four gold medals at the Games, the most of any athlete.

Event	Gold	Silver	Bronze
Men's 20 km individual	Ole Einar Bjørndalen; Norway	Frank Luck; Germany	Viktor Maigourov; Russia
Men's 10 km sprint	Ole Einar Bjørndalen; Norway	Sven Fischer; Germany	Wolfgang Perner; Austria
Men's 12.5 km pursuit	Ole Einar Bjørndalen; Norway	Raphaël Poirée; France	Ricco Groß; Germany
Men's 4 × 7.5 km relay	Norway; Halvard Hanevold; Frode Andresen; Egil Gjelland; Ole Einar Bjørndalen	Germany; Ricco Groß; Peter Sendel; Sven Fischer; Frank Luck	France; Gilles Marguet; Vincent Defrasne; Julien Robert; Raphaël Poirée
Women's 15 km individual	Andrea Henkel; Germany	Liv Grete Poirée; Norway	Magdalena Forsberg; Sweden
Women's 7.5 km sprint	Kati Wilhelm; Germany	Uschi Disl; Germany	Magdalena Forsberg; Sweden
Women's 10 km pursuit	Olga Pyleva; Russia	Kati Wilhelm; Germany	Irina Nikulchina; Bulgaria
Women's 4 × 6 km relay	Germany; Katrin Apel; Uschi Disl; Andrea Henkel; Kati Wilhelm	Norway; Ann-Elen Skjelbreid; Linda Tjørhom; Gunn Margit Andreassen; Liv Grete Skjelbreid Poirée	Russia; Olga Pyleva; Galina Koukleva; Svetlana Ishmouratova; Albina Akhatova

== Bobsleigh ==
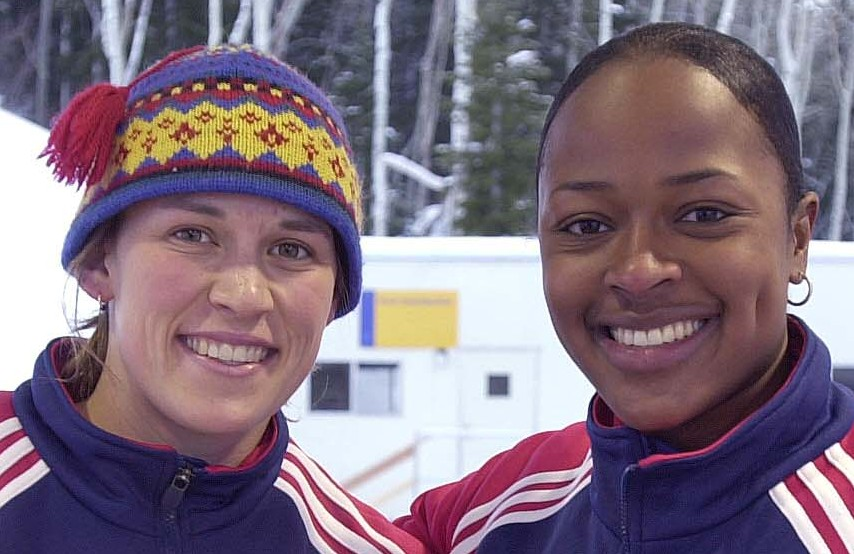
Jill Bakken (left) and Vonetta Flowers (right) won the first-ever Olympic women's bobsleigh competition.

Event	Gold	Silver	Bronze
Two-man	Germany (GER-1); Christoph Langen; Markus Zimmermann	Switzerland (SUI-1); Christian Reich; Steve Anderhub	Switzerland (SUI-2); Martin Annen; Beat Hefti
Four-man	Germany (GER-2); André Lange; Enrico Kühn; Kevin Kuske; Carsten Embach	United States (USA-1); Todd Hays; Randy Jones; Bill Schuffenhauer; Garrett Hines	United States (USA-2); Brian Shimer; Mike Kohn; Doug Sharp; Dan Steele
Two-woman	United States (USA-2); Jill Bakken; Vonetta Flowers	Germany (GER-1); Sandra Prokoff; Ulrike Holzner	Germany (GER-2); Susi Erdmann; Nicole Herschmann

== Cross-country skiing ==
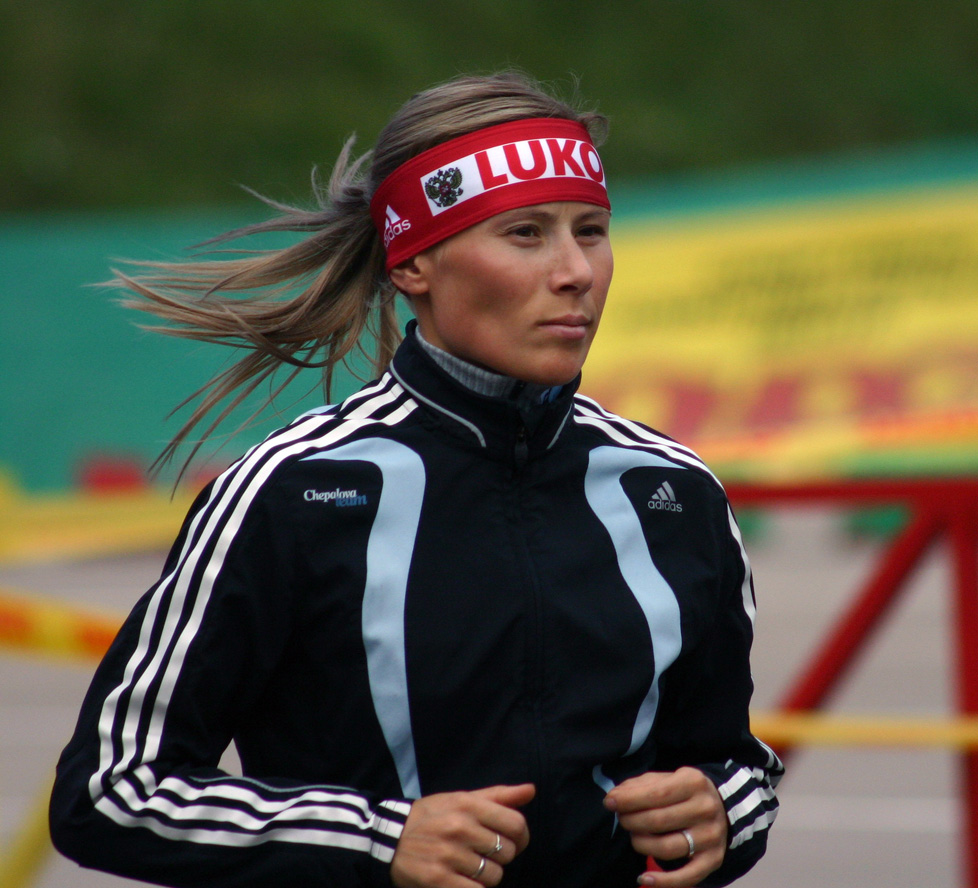
Yuliya Chepalova won one medal of each color at the 2002 Olympics. She was later found guilty of doping in 2006.

Event	Gold	Silver	Bronze
Men's 2 × 10 kilometre pursuit	Frode Estil; Norway^{[B]} Thomas Alsgaard; Norway^{[B]}	None awarded	Per Elofsson; Sweden^{[B]}
Men's 15 kilometre classical	Andrus Veerpalu; Estonia	Frode Estil; Norway	Jaak Mae; Estonia
Men's 30 kilometre freestyle mass start	Christian Hoffmann; Austria^{[C]}	Mikhail Botvinov; Austria^{[C]}	Kristen Skjeldal; Norway^{[C]}
Men's 50 kilometre classical	Mikhail Ivanov; Russia^{[D]}	Andrus Veerpalu; Estonia^{[D]}	Odd-Bjørn Hjelmeset; Norway^{[D]}
Men's 4 × 10 kilometre relay	Norway; Anders Aukland; Frode Estil; Kristen Skjeldal; Thomas Alsgaard	Italy; Fabio Maj; Giorgio Di Centa; Pietro Piller Cottrer; Cristian Zorzi	Germany; Jens Filbrich; Andreas Schlütter; Tobias Angerer; René Sommerfeldt
Men's sprint	Tor Arne Hetland; Norway	Peter Schlickenrieder; Germany	Cristian Zorzi; Italy
Women's 2 × 5 kilometre pursuit	Beckie Scott; Canada^{[E]}	Kateřina Neumannová; Czech Republic^{[E]}	Viola Bauer; Germany^{[E]}
Women's 10 kilometre classical	Bente Skari; Norway	Yuliya Chepalova; Russia	Stefania Belmondo; Italy
Women's 15 kilometre freestyle mass start	Stefania Belmondo; Italy	Kateřina Neumannová; Czech Republic^{[F]}	Yuliya Chepalova; Russia^{[F]}
Women's 30 kilometre classical	Gabriella Paruzzi; Italy^{[G]}	Stefania Belmondo; Italy^{[G]}	Bente Skari; Norway^{[G]}
Women's 4 × 5 kilometre relay	Germany; Manuela Henkel; Viola Bauer; Claudia Kunzel; Evi Sachenbacher	Norway; Marit Bjørgen; Bente Skari; Hilde Gjermundshaug Pedersen; Anita Moen	Switzerland; Andrea Huber; Laurence Rochat; Brigitte Albrecht-Loretan; Natascia Leonardi Cortesi
Women's sprint	Yuliya Chepalova; Russia	Evi Sachenbacher; Germany	Anita Moen; Norway

== Curling ==
Event	Gold	Silver	Bronze
Men's	Norway; Pål Trulsen; Lars Vågberg; Flemming Davanger; Bent Ånund Ramsfjell; Torger Nergård	Canada; Kevin Martin; Don Walchuk; Carter Rycroft; Don Bartlett; Ken Tralnberg	Switzerland; Andreas Schwaller; Christof Schwaller; Markus Eggler; Damian Grichting; Marco Ramstein
Women's	Great Britain; Rhona Martin; Deborah Knox; Fiona MacDonald; Janice Rankin; Margaret Morton	Switzerland; Luzia Ebnöther; Mirjam Ott; Tanya Frei; Laurence Bidaud; Nadia Röthlisberger	Canada; Kelley Law; Julie Skinner; Georgina Wheatcroft; Diane Nelson; Cheryl Noble

== Figure skating ==
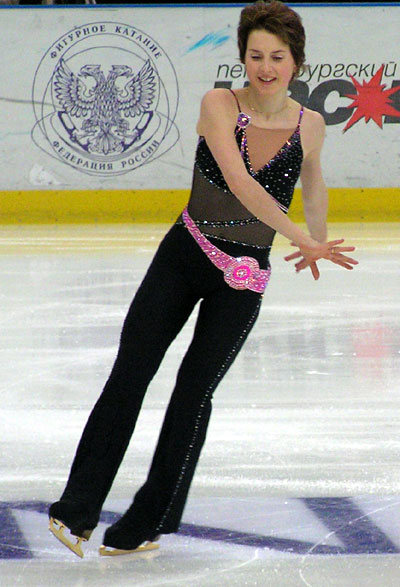
Irina Slutskaya, ladies' silver medalist in Salt Lake, also won the bronze four years later in the Torino Olympics.

Event	Gold	Silver	Bronze
Men's singles	Alexei Yagudin; Russia	Evgeni Plushenko; Russia	Timothy Goebel; United States
Women's singles	Sarah Hughes; United States	Irina Slutskaya; Russia	Michelle Kwan; United States
Pairs	Russia; Elena Berezhnaya; Anton Sikharulidze Canada; Jamie Salé; David Pelletier^{[H]}	None awarded	China; Shen Xue; Zhao Hongbo
Ice dancing	France; Marina Anissina; Gwendal Peizerat	Russia; Irina Lobacheva; Ilia Averbukh	Italy; Barbara Fusar-Poli; Maurizio Margaglio

== Freestyle skiing ==
Event	Gold	Silver	Bronze
Men's moguls	Janne Lahtela; Finland	Travis Mayer; United States	Richard Gay; France
Men's aerials	Aleš Valenta; Czech Republic	Joe Pack; United States	Aleksei Grishin; Belarus
Women's moguls	Kari Traa; Norway	Shannon Bahrke; United States	Tae Satoya; Japan
Women's aerials	Alisa Camplin; Australia	Veronica Brenner; Canada	Deidra Dionne; Canada

== Ice hockey ==
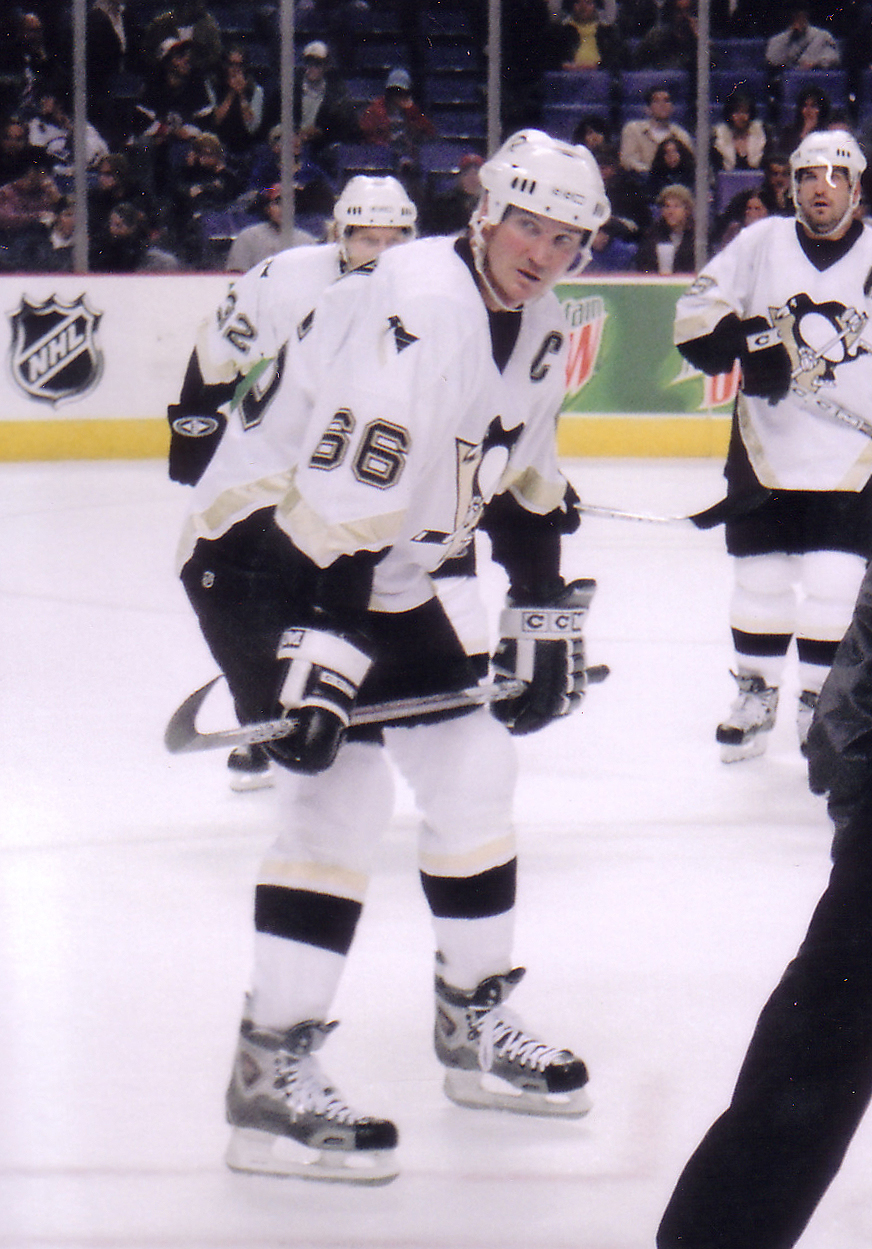
The gold medal-winning Canadian ice hockey team was captained by Mario Lemieux (pictured playing for the Pittsburgh Penguins in 2005), who played in five games during the tournament.

Event	Gold	Silver	Bronze
Men's team	Canada; Ed Belfour; Rob Blake; Eric Brewer; Martin Brodeur; Theoren Fleury; Adam Foote; Simon Gagné; Jarome Iginla; Curtis Joseph; Ed Jovanovski; Paul Kariya; Mario Lemieux; Eric Lindros; Al MacInnis; Scott Niedermayer; Joe Nieuwendyk; Owen Nolan; Michael Peca; Chris Pronger; Joe Sakic; Brendan Shanahan; Ryan Smyth; Steve Yzerman	United States; Tony Amonte; Tom Barrasso; Chris Chelios; Adam Deadmarsh; Chris Drury; Mike Dunham; Bill Guerin; Phil Housley; Brett Hull; John LeClair; Brian Leetch; Aaron Miller; Mike Modano; Tom Poti; Brian Rafalski; Mike Richter; Jeremy Roenick; Brian Rolston; Gary Suter; Keith Tkachuk; Doug Weight; Mike York; Scott Young	Russia; Maxim Afinogenov; Ilya Bryzgalov; Pavel Bure; Valeri Bure; Pavel Datsyuk; Sergei Fedorov; Sergei Gonchar; Darius Kasparaitis; Nikolai Khabibulin; Ilya Kovalchuk; Alexei Kovalev; Igor Kravchuk; Oleg Kvasha; Igor Larionov; Vladimir Malakhov; Daniil Markov; Boris Mironov; Andrei Nikolishin; Yegor Podomatsky; Sergei Samsonov; Oleg Tverdovsky; Alexei Yashin; Alexei Zhamnov
Women's team	Canada; Dana Antal; Kelly Bechard; Jennifer Botterill; Thérèse Brisson; Cassie Campbell; Isabelle Chartrand; Lori Dupuis; Danielle Goyette; Geraldine Heaney; Jayna Hefford; Becky Kellar; Caroline Ouellette; Cherie Piper; Cheryl Pounder; Tammy Lee Shewchuk; Sami Jo Small; Colleen Sostorics; Kim St-Pierre; Vicky Sunohara; Hayley Wickenheiser	United States; Chris Bailey; Laurie Baker; Karyn Bye; Julie Chu; Natalie Darwitz; Sara Decosta; Tricia Dunn-Luoma; Cammi Granato; Courtney Kennedy; Andrea Kilbourne; Katie King; Shelley Looney; Sue Merz; Allison Mleczko; Tara Mounsey; Jenny Potter; Angela Ruggiero; Sarah Tueting; Lyndsay Wall; Krissy Wendell	Sweden; Annica Åhlén; Lotta Almblad; Anna Andersson; Gunilla Andersson; Emelie Berggren; Kristina Bergstrand; Ann-Louise Edstrand; Joa Elfsberg; Erika Holst; Nanna Jansson; Maria Larsson; Ylva Lindberg; Ulrica Lindström; Kim Martin; Josefin Pettersson; Maria Rooth; Danijela Rundqvist; Evelina Samuelsson; Therese Sjölander; Anna Vikman

== Luge ==
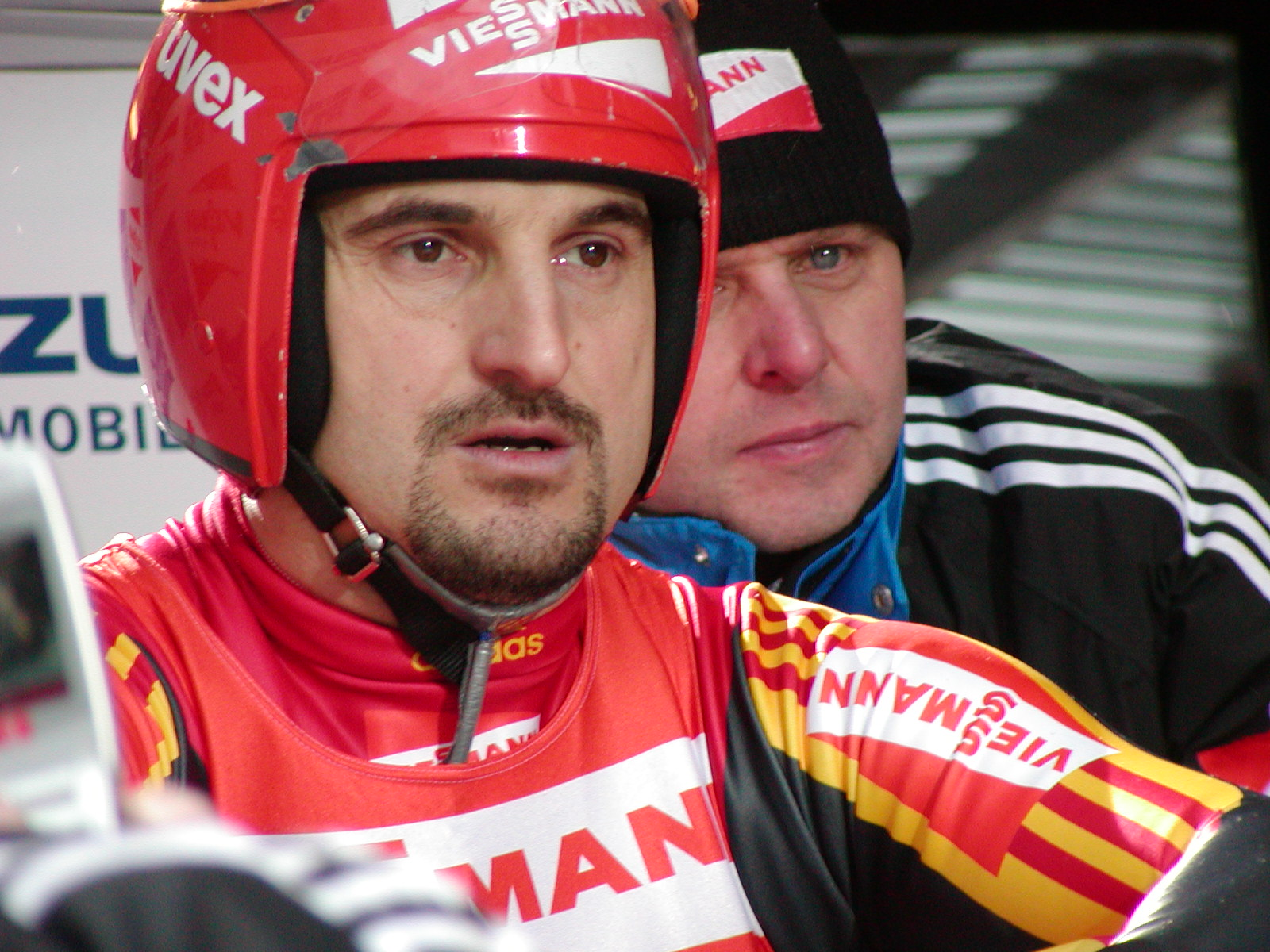
Georg Hackl (pictured left) won a silver medal in the men's singles event, in the process becoming the first Olympian to win a medal in the same individual event at five straight Olympic Games.

Event	Gold	Silver	Bronze
Men's singles	Armin Zöggeler; Italy	Georg Hackl; Germany	Markus Prock; Austria
Women's singles	Sylke Otto; Germany	Barbara Niedernhuber; Germany	Silke Kraushaar; Germany
Doubles	Germany; Patric Leitner; Alexander Resch	United States; Mark Grimmette; Brian Martin	United States; Chris Thorpe; Clay Ives

== Nordic combined ==
Event	Gold	Silver	Bronze
Sprint	Samppa Lajunen; Finland	Ronny Ackermann; Germany	Felix Gottwald; Austria
Individual Gundersen	Samppa Lajunen; Finland	Jaakko Tallus; Finland	Felix Gottwald; Austria
Team	Finland; Jari Mantila; Hannu Manninen; Jaakko Tallus; Samppa Lajunen	Germany; Björn Kircheisen; Georg Hettich; Marcel Höhlig; Ronny Ackermann	Austria; Christoph Bieler; Michael Gruber; Mario Stecher; Felix Gottwald

== Short track speed skating ==
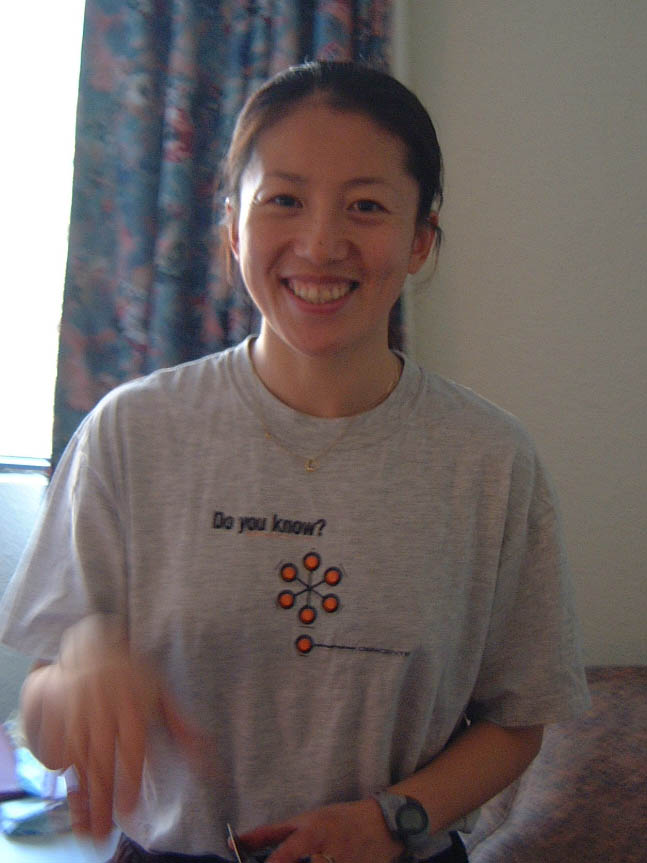
Yang Yang (A) won two golds and a silver medal at the 2002 Games, in doing so making her the first Chinese Winter Olympic champion.

Event	Gold	Silver	Bronze
Men's 500 metres	Marc Gagnon; Canada	Jonathan Guilmette; Canada	Rusty Smith; United States
Men's 1000 metres	Steven Bradbury; Australia	Apolo Anton Ohno; United States	Mathieu Turcotte; Canada
Men's 1500 metres	Apolo Anton Ohno; United States	Li Jiajun; China	Marc Gagnon; Canada
Men's 5000 metre relay	Canada; Jonathan Guilmette; Marc Gagnon; François-Louis Tremblay; Mathieu Turcotte; Éric Bédard	Italy; Nicola Franceschina; Nicola Rodigari; Fabio Carta; Maurizio Carnino; Michele Antonioli	China; Li Jiajun; Feng Kai; Guo Wei; Li Ye; An Yulong
Women's 500 metres	Yang Yang (A); China	Evgenia Radanova; Bulgaria	Wang Chunlu; China
Women's 1000 metres	Yang Yang (A); China	Ko Gi-Hyun; South Korea	Yang Yang (S); China
Women's 1500 metres	Ko Gi-Hyun; South Korea	Choi Eun-Kyung; South Korea	Evgenia Radanova; Bulgaria
Women's 3000 metre relay	South Korea; Choi Eun-Kyung; Choi Min-Kyung; Park Hye-Won; Joo Min-Jin	China; Yang Yang (A); Yang Yang (S); Sun Dandan; Wang Chunlu	Canada; Isabelle Charest; Alanna Kraus; Amélie Goulet-Nadon; Marie-Ève Drolet; Tania Vicent

== Skeleton ==
Event	Gold	Silver	Bronze
Men's	Jim Shea; United States	Martin Rettl; Austria	Gregor Stähli; Switzerland
Women's	Tristan Gale; United States	Lea Ann Parsley; United States	Alex Coomber; Great Britain

== Ski jumping ==
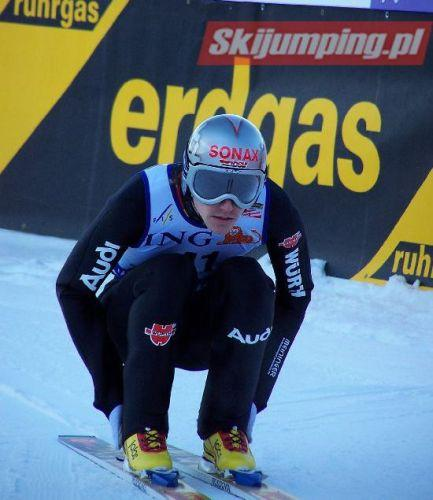
Sven Hannawald won a gold and a silver medal in Salt Lake City.

Event	Gold	Silver	Bronze
Normal hill individual	Simon Ammann; Switzerland	Sven Hannawald; Germany	Adam Małysz; Poland
Large hill individual	Simon Ammann; Switzerland	Adam Małysz; Poland	Matti Hautamäki; Finland
Large hill team	Germany; Sven Hannawald; Stephan Hocke; Michael Uhrmann; Martin Schmitt	Finland; Matti Hautamäki; Veli-Matti Lindström; Risto Jussilainen; Janne Ahonen	Slovenia; Damjan Fras; Primož Peterka; Robert Kranjec; Peter Žonta

== Snowboarding ==
Event	Gold	Silver	Bronze
Men's halfpipe	Ross Powers; United States	Danny Kass; United States	Jarret Thomas; United States
Men's parallel giant slalom	Philipp Schoch; Switzerland	Richard Richardsson; Sweden	Chris Klug; United States
Women's halfpipe	Kelly Clark; United States	Doriane Vidal; France	Fabienne Reuteler; Switzerland
Women's parallel giant slalom	Isabelle Blanc; France	Karine Ruby; France	Lidia Trettel; Italy

== Speed skating ==
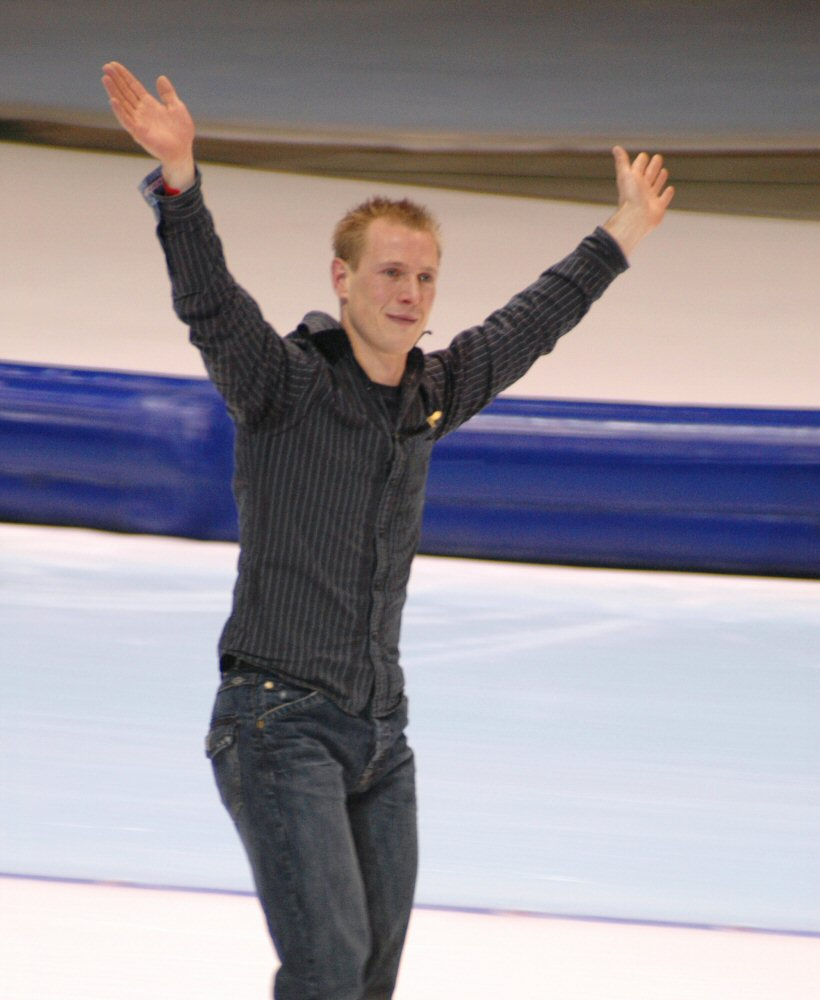
Jochem Uytdehaage, who won two gold medals at the 2002 Games, set new world records in both events.

Event	Gold	Silver	Bronze
Men's 500 metres	Casey FitzRandolph; United States	Hiroyasu Shimizu; Japan	Kip Carpenter; United States
Men's 1000 metres	Gerard van Velde; Netherlands	Jan Bos; Netherlands	Joey Cheek; United States
Men's 1500 metres	Derek Parra; United States	Jochem Uytdehaage; Netherlands	Ådne Søndrål; Norway
Men's 5000 metres	Jochem Uytdehaage; Netherlands	Derek Parra; United States	Jens Boden; Germany
Men's 10000 metres	Jochem Uytdehaage; Netherlands	Gianni Romme; Netherlands	Lasse Sætre; Norway
Women's 500 metres	Catriona Le May Doan; Canada	Monique Garbrecht-Enfeldt; Germany	Sabine Völker; Germany
Women's 1000 metres	Chris Witty; United States	Sabine Völker; Germany	Jennifer Rodriguez; United States
Women's 1500 metres	Anni Friesinger; Germany	Sabine Völker; Germany	Jennifer Rodriguez; United States
Women's 3000 metres	Claudia Pechstein; Germany	Renate Groenewold; Netherlands	Cindy Klassen; Canada
Women's 5000 metres	Claudia Pechstein; Germany	Gretha Smit; Netherlands	Clara Hughes; Canada

== Medal winner changes ==
A. Alain Baxter, representing Great Britain, originally placed third and was awarded the bronze medal. However, Baxter tested positive for methamphetamine, and was stripped of his medal. Baxter was later cleared of intentionally doping by the Court of Arbitration for Sport (CAS), but the International Olympic Committee did not re-award his medal. Benjamin Raich was promoted to bronze.
B. Johann Mühlegg of Spain originally won the 10 km/10 km pursuit, but nine days after the race he failed a doping test following his gold medal win in the 50 km classical race. In 2003, a CAS ruling against Mühlegg allowed the International Olympic Committee to strip him of his other medals. Norwegians Frode Estil and Thomas Alsgaard, who had originally tied in a dead heat for silver, were promoted to gold, while fourth-placed Per Elofsson was promoted to bronze.
C. Mühlegg had also won gold in the 30 km mass start event, and lost it following the CAS ruling in December 2003. Christian Hoffmann, Mikhail Botvinov and Kristen Skjeldal were all promoted one position each into gold, silver and bronze respectively.
D. Mühlegg won gold in the 50 km, but after the podium ceremony it emerged that he had failed a test for darbepoetin alfa, and was immediately stripped of his medal. Mikhail Ivanov, Andrus Veerpalu and Odd-Bjørn Hjelmeset were elevated to gold, silver and bronze respectively.
E. Russian skier Olga Danilova had finished the event in first, ahead of compatriot Larissa Lazutina and Canada's Beckie Scott. In June 2003, a Swiss court ruled that the IOC could rescind Lazutina's silver medal for a positive test for darbepoetin, promoting Scott to silver and Kateřina Neumannová to bronze. The CAS then ruled in December that Danilova's medal could also be rescinded for her failed darbepoetin test, leading to another change in the event standings. Scott and Neumannová were both promoted again, with Viola Bauer now getting the bronze.
F. Lazutina's silver medal in the 15 km event was also forfeited in 2003 following the Swiss court's ruling. Neumannová was again a beneficiary, being promoted to silver, while Lazutina's teammate Yuliya Chepalova was promoted to bronze. She failed a drug test later in her career, but her results were left unaffected.
G. Lazutina won gold in the 30 km classical race, but because of her failed doping test was stripped of the medal after the race. Gabriella Paruzzi was promoted to gold, Stefania Belmondo to silver and Bente Skari to bronze.
H. Canada's Salé and Pelletier finished second based on the original judges' scores. However, following the revelation of a collusion between the Russian officials and a French judge, the original scores were thrown out and Salé and Pelletier were elevated to joint-gold with the Russian pair.

== Medal leaders ==
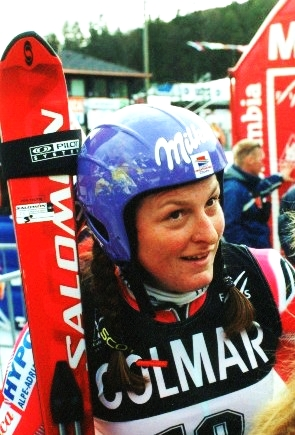
Janica Kostelić, who won four medals at the Games, became the first alpine skier to win four medals at a single Olympics, and the first female athlete to win three gold medals at a single Olympics.

Athletes who won at least two gold medals or three total medals are listed below by number of medals won, followed by number of gold, silver, and bronze.

Athlete	Nation	Sport	Gold	Silver	Bronze	Total
Ole Einar Bjørndalen	Norway	Biathlon	4	0	0	4
Janica Kostelić	Croatia	Alpine skiing	3	1	0	4
Samppa Lajunen	Finland	Nordic combined	3	0	0	3
Kati Wilhelm	Germany	Biathlon	2	1	0	3
Yang Yang (A)	China	Short track speed skating	2	1	0	3
Jochem Uytdehaage	Netherlands	Speed skating	2	1	0	3
Frode Estil	Norway	Cross-country skiing	2	1	0	3
Marc Gagnon	Canada	Short track speed skating	2	0	1	3
Stefania Belmondo	Italy	Cross-country skiing	1	1	1	3
Bente Skari	Norway	Cross-country skiing	1	1	1	3
Stephan Eberharter	Austria	Alpine skiing	1	1	1	3
Yuliya Chepalova	Russia	Cross-country skiing	1	1	1	3
Sabine Völker	Germany	Speed skating	0	2	1	3
Felix Gottwald	Austria	Nordic combined	0	0	3	3
Claudia Pechstein	Germany	Speed skating	2	0	0	2
Thomas Alsgaard	Norway	Cross-country skiing	2	0	0	2
Kjetil André Aamodt	Norway	Alpine skiing	2	0	0	2
Simon Ammann	Switzerland	Ski jumping	2	0	0	2
Andrea Henkel	Germany	Biathlon	2	0	0	2

== See also ==
- 2002 Winter Olympics medal table
