= Sweden at the 2002 Winter Olympics =

- IOC code: SWE
- NOC: Swedish Olympic Committee
- Website: www.sok.se (in Swedish and English)

in Salt Lake City
- Competitors: 102 (56 men, 46 women) in 11 sports
- Flag bearer: Magdalena Forsberg (biathlon)
- Medals Ranked 19th: Gold 0 Silver 2 Bronze 5 Total 7

Winter Olympics appearances (overview)
- 1924; 1928; 1932; 1936; 1948; 1952; 1956; 1960; 1964; 1968; 1972; 1976; 1980; 1984; 1988; 1992; 1994; 1998; 2002; 2006; 2010; 2014; 2018; 2022; 2026

Sweden competed at the 2002 Winter Olympics in Salt Lake City, United States. Sweden won seven medals; two silver and five bronze. For the first time ever Sweden failed to win gold medals in two straight Winter Olympic Games. However, they did win medals in five different Winter Olympic sports for the first time, beating the previous record of four sports.

== Medalists ==
Medal	Name	Sport	Event	Date
Silver	Richard Richardsson	Snowboarding	Men's parallel giant slalom	February 15
Silver	Anja Pärson	Alpine skiing	Women's giant slalom	February 22
Bronze	Magdalena Forsberg	Biathlon	Women's sprint	February 11
Bronze	Magdalena Forsberg	Biathlon	Women's individual	February 13
Bronze	Per Elofsson	Cross-country skiing	Men's 2 × 10 km pursuit	February 14
Bronze	Anja Pärson	Alpine skiing	Women's slalom	February 20
Bronze	Sweden national women's ice hockey team: Annica Åhlén; Lotta Almblad; Anna Andersson; Gunilla Andersson; Emelie Berggren; Kristina Bergstrand; Ann-Louise Edstrand; Joa Elfsberg; Erika Holst; Nanna Jansson; Maria Larsson; Ylva Lindberg; Ulrica Lindström; Kim Martin; Josefin Pettersson; Maria Rooth; Danijela Rundqvist; Evelina Samuelsson; Therese Sjölander; Anna Vikman	Ice hockey	Women's tournament	February 21

== Alpine skiing ==
Men

Athlete	Event	Race 1	Race 2	Total	
Athlete	Event	Time	Time	Time	Rank
Patrik Järbyn	Downhill			1:41.05	18
Fredrik Nyberg	Downhill			1:40.30	7
Fredrik Nyberg	Super-G			DNF	–
Patrik Järbyn	Super-G			1:23.40	11
Patrik Järbyn	Giant slalom	1:14.95	1:12.71	2:27.66	24
Fredrik Nyberg	Giant slalom	1:13.41	1:11.88	2:25.29	13
Markus Larsson	Slalom	50.29	52.57	1:42.86	7

Women

Athlete	Event	Race 1	Race 2	Total	
Athlete	Event	Time	Time	Time	Rank
Janette Hargin	Downhill			1:42.83	25
Pernilla Wiberg	Downhill			1:41.09	14
Janette Hargin	Super-G			1:16.75	27
Pernilla Wiberg	Super-G			1:14.89	12
Janette Hargin	Giant slalom	1:20.02	1:18.49	2:38.51	31
Anna Ottosson	Giant slalom	1:17.12	1:15.81	2:32.93	9
Ylva Nowén	Giant slalom	1:17.09	1:15.69	2:32.78	7
Anja Pärson	Giant slalom	1:16.87	1:14.46	2:31.33	2nd place, silver medalist(s)
Susanne Ekman	Slalom	57.10	57.22	1:54.32	22
Anna Ottosson	Slalom	55.32	56.45	1:51.77	13
Ylva Nowén	Slalom	53.08	54.10	1:47.18	4
Anja Pärson	Slalom	52.57	54.52	1:47.09	3rd place, bronze medalist(s)

Women's combined

Athlete	Downhill	Slalom		Total	
Athlete	Time	Time 1	Time 2	Total time	Rank
Janette Hargin	DNF	46.14	44.18	DNF	–

== Biathlon ==
Men

Event	Athlete	Misses ^{1}	Time	Rank
10 km sprint	Tord Wiksten	4	29:39.5	78
10 km sprint	Henrik Forsberg	6	28:04.0	63
10 km sprint	Carl Johan Bergman	1	26:47.1	28
10 km sprint	Björn Ferry	2	26:30.5	17
12.5 km pursuit ^{2}	Carl Johan Bergman	1	36:33.4	36
12.5 km pursuit ^{2}	Björn Ferry	4	35:27.5	24

Event	Athlete	Time	Misses	Adjusted time ^{3}	Rank
20 km	Tord Wiksten	56:02.3	2	58:02.3	55
20 km	Henrik Forsberg	51:22.0	6	57:22.0	47
20 km	Carl Johan Bergman	53:24.5	3	56:24.5	40
20 km	Björn Ferry	52:20.7	4	56:20.7	38

Men's 4 × 7.5 km relay

Athletes	Race		
Athletes	Misses ^{1}	Time	Rank
Carl Johan Bergman; Henrik Forsberg; Tord Wiksten; Björn Ferry	1	1'29:52.8	14

Women

Event	Athlete	Misses ^{1}	Time	Rank
7.5 km sprint	Magdalena Forsberg	1	21:20.4	3rd place, bronze medalist(s)
10 km pursuit ^{4}	Magdalena Forsberg	3	31:34.0	6

Event	Athlete	Time	Misses	Adjusted time ^{3}	Rank
15 km	Magdalena Forsberg	46:08.3	2	48:08.3	3rd place, bronze medalist(s)

^{1} A penalty loop of 150 metres had to be skied per missed target.
^{2} Starting delay based on 10 km sprint results.
^{3} One minute added per missed target.
^{4} Starting delay based on 7.5 km sprint results.

== Bobsleigh ==
Women

Sled	Athletes	Event	Run 1		Run 2		Total	
Sled	Athletes	Event	Time	Rank	Time	Rank	Time	Rank
SWE-1	Karin Olsson; Lina Engren	Two-woman	50.37	15	49.93	14	1:40.30	14

== Cross-country skiing ==
Men

Sprint

Athlete	Qualifying round		Quarter finals		Semi finals		Finals	
Athlete	Time	Rank	Time	Rank	Time	Rank	Time	Final rank
Jörgen Brink	2:56.84	25	did not advance					
Thobias Fredriksson	2:54.45	18	did not advance					
Peter Larsson	2:53.55	14 Q	DSQ	–	did not advance			
Björn Lind	2:52.17	9 Q	3:02.2	1 Q	3:10.4	2 QF	2:58.1	4

Pursuit

Athlete	10 km C		10 km F pursuit^{1}	
Athlete	Time	Rank	Time	Final rank
Niklas Jonsson	27:32.0	33 Q	25:18.1	28
Mathias Fredriksson	27:02.9	19 Q	25:12.9	27
Per Elofsson	26:39.3	8 Q	23:45.9	3rd place, bronze medalist(s)

Event	Athlete	Race	
Event	Athlete	Time	Rank
15 km C	Morgan Göransson	39:45.7	27
15 km C	Urban Lindgren	39:24.8	17
15 km C	Magnus Ingesson	38:38.5	8
15 km C	Per Elofsson	38:10.8	5
30 km F	Morgan Göransson	DNF	–
30 km F	Per Elofsson	DNF	–
30 km F	Niklas Jonsson	1'16:25.2	36
50 km C	Mathias Fredriksson	2'18:42.1	29
50 km C	Per Elofsson	2'14:50.6	17
50 km C	Magnus Ingesson	2'14:48.6	16

^{1} Starting delay based on 10 km C. results.
C = Classical style, F = Freestyle

4 × 10 km relay

Athletes	Race	
Athletes	Time	Rank
Urban Lindgren; Mathias Fredriksson; Niklas Jonsson; Morgan Göransson	1'37:59.5	13

Women

Sprint

Athlete	Qualifying round		Quarter finals		Semi finals		Finals	
Athlete	Time	Rank	Time	Rank	Time	Rank	Time	Final rank
Anna-Carin Olofsson-Zidek	3:28.07	37	did not advance					
Elin Ek	3:25.93	35	did not advance					
Anna Dahlberg-Olsson	3:25.32	33	did not advance					
Lina Andersson	3:22.65	28	did not advance					

Pursuit

Athlete	5 km C		5 km F pursuit^{2}	
Athlete	Time	Rank	Time	Final rank
Anna-Carin Olofsson-Zidek	14:28.3	47 Q	14:22.5	46
Elin Ek	14:01.6	28 Q	13:20.1	25
Jenny Olsson	14:00.7	27 Q	13:31.6	35
Lina Andersson	13:50.6	18 Q	13:37.5	39

Event	Athlete	Race	
Event	Athlete	Time	Rank
10 km C	Anna Dahlberg-Olsson	31:01.7	40
10 km C	Jenny Olsson	30:09.5	22
10 km C	Elin Ek	30:02.3	19
10 km C	Lina Andersson	30:00.1	16
15 km F	Jenny Olsson	43:57.7	39
15 km F	Elin Ek	43:55.3	38
15 km F	Anna Dahlberg-Olsson	43:53.7	36
15 km F	Anna-Carin Olofsson-Zidek	42:53.8	30
30 km C	Ulrika Persson	DNF	–
30 km C	Anna-Carin Olofsson-Zidek	DNF	–
30 km C	Anna Dahlberg-Olsson	1'46:51.3	39
30 km C	Elin Ek	1'40:48.2	25

^{2} Starting delay based on 5 km C. results.
C = Classical style, F = Freestyle

4 × 5 km relay

Athletes	Race	
Athletes	Time	Rank
Lina Andersson; Elin Ek; Jenny Olsson; Anna Dahlberg-Olsson	52:40.4	12

== Curling ==
Summary

Team	Event	Group stage										Tiebreaker	Semifinal	Final / BM	
Team	Event	Opposition Score	Opposition Score	Opposition Score	Opposition Score	Opposition Score	Opposition Score	Opposition Score	Opposition Score	Opposition Score	Rank	Opposition Score	Opposition Score	Opposition Score	Rank
Peja Lindholm; Tomas Nordin; Magnus Swartling; Peter Narup; Anders Kraupp	Men's tournament	USA; L 5–10	GBR; W 7–2	DEN; W 9–5	SUI; L 7–8	CAN; W 6–5	FRA; W 9–6	FIN; W 11–4	GER; W 5–4	NOR; L 8–9	4 Q	BYE	CAN; L 4–6	SUI; L 3–7	4
Elisabet Gustafson; Katarina Nyberg; Louise Marmont; Elisabeth Persson; Christina Bertrup	Women's tournament	CAN; L 4–5	GBR; W 7–4	USA; L 5–6	DEN; L 9–11	NOR; W 10–3	JPN; W 8–7	GER; L 5–7	SUI; W 8–7	RUS; W 9–6	=4 QT	GBR; L 4–6	did not advance		6

=== Men's tournament ===
==== Group stage ====
Top four teams advanced to semi-finals.

Country	Skip	W	L
Canada	Kevin Martin	8	1
Norway	Pål Trulsen	7	2
Switzerland	Andreas Schwaller	6	3
Sweden	Peja Lindholm	6	3
Finland	Markku Uusipaavalniemi	5	4
Germany	Sebastian Stock	4	5
Denmark	Ulrik Schmidt	3	6
(United Kingdom) Great Britain	Hammy McMillan	3	6
United States	Tim Somerville	3	6
France	Dominique Dupont-Roc	0	9

Team 1	Score	Team 2
United States	10–5	Sweden
Sweden	7–2	United Kingdom
Denmark	5–9	Sweden
Sweden	7–8	Switzerland
Canada	5–6	Sweden
France	6–9	Sweden
Finland	4–11	Sweden
Germany	4–5	Sweden
Sweden	8–9	Norway

==== Medal round ====
Semi-final

Sheet B	1	2	3	4	5	6	7	8	9	10	Final
Sweden (Lindholm)	0	2	0	0	1	0	1	0	0	0	4
Canada (Martin)	3	0	0	1	0	1	0	1	0	0	6

Bronze medal game

Sheet C	1	2	3	4	5	6	7	8	9	10	Final
Sweden (Lindholm) 4th	0	0	2	0	1	0	0	0	0	X	3
Switzerland (Schwaller)	1	2	0	1	0	0	2	1	0	X	7

Contestants

Sweden
Östersunds CK, Östersund

Skip: Peja Lindholm
Third: Tomas Nordin
Second: Magnus Swartling
Lead: Peter Narup
Alternate: Anders Kraupp

=== Women's tournament ===
==== Group stage ====
Top four teams advanced to semi-finals.

Country	Skip	W	L
Canada	Kelley Law	8	1
Switzerland	Luzia Ebnöther	7	2
United States	Kari Erickson	6	3
(United Kingdom) Great Britain	Rhona Martin	5	4
Germany	Natalie Neßler	5	4
Sweden 6th	Elisabet Gustafson	5	4
Norway	Dordi Nordby	4	5
Japan	Akiko Katoh	2	7
Denmark	Lene Bidstrup	2	7
Russia	Olga Jarkova	1	8

Team 1	Score	Team 2
Sweden	4–5	Canada
Sweden	7–4	United Kingdom
Sweden	5–6	United States
Sweden	9–11	Denmark
Sweden	10–3	Norway
Japan	7–8	Sweden
Germany	7–5	Sweden
Switzerland	7–8	Sweden
Sweden	9–6	Russia

Tie-breaker

Team 1	Score	Team 2
Sweden 6th	4–6	United Kingdom

Contestants

Sweden
Umeå CC, Umeå

Skip: Elisabet Gustafson
Third: Katarina Nyberg
Second: Louise Marmont
Lead: Elisabeth Persson
Alternate: Christina Bertrup

== Freestyle skiing ==
Men

Athlete	Event	Qualification			Final		
Athlete	Event	Time	Points	Rank	Time	Points	Rank
Patrik Sundberg	Moguls	29.58	23.16	22	did not advance		
Fredrik Fortkord	Moguls	30.24	24.81	14 Q	28.15	24.89	13

Women

Athlete	Event	Qualification			Final		
Athlete	Event	Time	Points	Rank	Time	Points	Rank
Sara Kjellin	Moguls	35.50	22.44	12 Q	DNF	DNF	–
Liselotte Johansson	Aerials		125.20	21	did not advance		

== Ice hockey ==
Summary

Key:

- OT – Overtime
- GWS – Match decided by penalty-shootout

Team	Event	Group stage				Quarterfinal	Semifinal / Pl.	Final / BM / Pl.	
Team	Event	Opposition Score	Opposition Score	Opposition Score	Rank	Opposition Score	Opposition Score	Opposition Score	Rank
Sweden men's	Men's tournament	Canada; W 5–2	Czech Republic; W 2–1	Germany; W 7–1	1	Belarus; L 3–4	did not advance		5
Sweden women's	Women's tournament	Russia; W 3–2	Kazakhstan; W 7–0	Canada; L 0–11	2 Q	—N/a	United States; L 0–4	Finland; W 2–1	3rd place, bronze medalist(s)

=== Men's tournament ===
==== First round - group C ====
Team	GP	W	L	T	GF	GA	GD	Pts
Sweden	3	3	0	0	14	4	+10	6
Czech Republic	3	1	1	1	12	7	+5	3
Canada	3	1	1	1	8	10	−2	3
Germany	3	0	3	0	5	18	−13	0

All times are local (UTC-7).

15 February 2002; 16:10	Canada	2 – 5 (1–1, 0–4, 1–0)	Sweden	E Center, West Valley City; Attendance: 8,597

17 February 2002; 16:05	Sweden	2 – 1 (1–0, 1–1, 0–0)	Czech Republic	E Center, West Valley City; Attendance: 8,599

18 February 2002; 19:00	Germany	1 – 7 (0–3, 0–3, 1–1)	Sweden	Peaks Ice Arena, Provo; Attendance: 6,348

==== Quarter final ====
20 February 2002; 11:05	Sweden	3 – 4 (1–2, 1–0, 1–2)	Belarus	E Center, West Valley City; Attendance: 7,240

- Team roster

- Johan Hedberg
- Mikael Tellqvist
- Tommy Salo
- Mattias Öhlund
- Kim Johnsson
- Fredrik Olausson
- Nicklas Lidström
- Marcus Ragnarsson
- Mattias Norström
- Kenny Jönsson
- Daniel Alfredsson
- P. J. Axelsson
- Mats Sundin
- Mathias Johansson
- Mikael Renberg
- Magnus Arvedson
- Ulf Dahlén
- Niklas Sundström
- Henrik Zetterberg
- Jörgen Jönsson
- Markus Näslund
- Michael Nylander
- Tomas Holmström

- Head coach: Hardy Nilsson

=== Women's tournament ===
==== First round - group A ====
Top two teams (shaded) advanced to semifinals.

Team	GP	W	L	T	GF	GA	GD	Pts
Canada	3	3	0	0	25	0	+25	6
Sweden	3	2	1	0	10	13	−3	4
Russia	3	1	2	0	6	11	−5	2
Kazakhstan	3	0	3	0	1	18	−17	0

All times are local (UTC-7).

11 February 2002; 14:00	Sweden	3 – 2 (2–0, 1–2, 0–0)	Russia	Peaks Ice Arena, Provo; Attendance: 5,241

13 February 2002; 14:00	Sweden	7 – 0 (3–0, 2–0, 2–0)	Kazakhstan	Peaks Ice Arena, Provo; Attendance: 5,349

16 February 2002; 19:00	Canada	11 – 0 (1–0, 4–0, 6–0)	Sweden	Peaks Ice Arena, Provo; Attendance: 6,306

==== Medal round ====
Semi-final

19 February 2002; 16:30	United States	4 – 0 (2–0, 1–0, 1–0)	Sweden	E Center, West Valley City; Attendance: 7,738

Bronze medal game

21 February 2002; 12:10	Finland	1 – 2 (0–2, 1–0, 0–0)	Sweden (bronze)	Peaks Ice Arena, Provo; Attendance: 6,298

Contestants; Annica Åhlén; Lotta Almblad; Anna Andersson; Gunilla Andersson; Emelie Berggren; Kristina Bergstrand; Ann-Louise Edstrand; Joa Elfsberg; Erika Holst; Nanna Jansson; Maria Larsson; Ylva Lindberg; Ulrica Lindström; Kim Martin; Josefin Pettersson; Maria Rooth; Danijela Rundqvist; Evelina Samuelsson; Therese Sjölander; Anna Vikman

== Luge ==
Men

Athlete	Run 1		Run 2		Run 3		Run 4		Total	
Athlete	Time	Rank	Time	Rank	Time	Rank	Time	Rank	Time	Rank
Anders Söderberg	46.624	36	45.228	22	45.064	23	45.298	24	3:02.214	28
Bengt Walden	45.455	26	45.189	21	45.081	25	45.561	26	3:01.286	23

(Men's) Doubles

Athletes	Run 1		Run 2		Total	
Athletes	Time	Rank	Time	Rank	Time	Rank
Anders Söderberg; Bengt Walden	45.589	17	DNF	–	DNF	–

== Short track speed skating ==
Men

Athlete	Event	Round one		Quarter finals		Semi finals		Finals	
Athlete	Event	Time	Rank	Time	Rank	Time	Rank	Time	Final rank
Martin Johansson	500 m	43.435	3	did not advance					
Martin Johansson	1000 m	DSQ	–	did not advance					
Martin Johansson	1500 m	2:25.824	3 Q			2:24.032	4 QB	2:28.559	9

== Snowboarding ==
Men's parallel giant slalom

Athlete	Qualifying		Round one	Quarter final	Semi final	Final	Rank
Athlete	Time	Rank	Round one	Quarter final	Semi final	Final	Rank
Jonas Aspman	38.88	28	did not advance				
Stephen Copp	37.32	12 Q	(Slovenia) Dejan Košir L	did not advance			
Richard Richardsson	36.58	4 Q	(Germany) Mathias Behounek W	(Slovenia) Dejan Košir W	(France) Nicolas Huet W	(Switzerland) Philipp Schoch L	2nd place, silver medalist(s)
Daniel Biveson	36.42	3 Q	(Italy) Walter Feichter L	did not advance			

Men's halfpipe

Athlete	Qualifying round 1		Qualifying round 2		Final	
Athlete	Points	Rank	Points	Rank	Points	Rank
Stefan Karlsson	29.8	19	30.4	18	did not advance	
Magnus Sterner	32.0	16	39.1	6 Q	36.6	11
Tomas Johansson	32.1	15	30.1	19	did not advance	

Women's parallel giant slalom

Athlete	Qualifying		Round one	Quarter final	Semi final	Final	Rank
Athlete	Time	Rank	Round one	Quarter final	Semi final	Final	Rank
Sara Fischer	43.21	18	did not advance				
Åsa Windahl	42.41	10 Q	(United States) Lisa Kosglow L	did not advance			

Women's halfpipe

Athlete	Qualifying round 1		Qualifying round 2		Final	
Athlete	Points	Rank	Points	Rank	Points	Rank
Janet Jonsson	13.0	22	16.1	15	did not advance	
Anna Hellman	19.6	18	DNF	–	did not advance	

== Speed skating ==
Men

Event	Athlete	Race	
Event	Athlete	Time	Rank
1500 m	Johan Röjler	1:49.50	38
5000 m	Johan Röjler	6:33.18	22
