= Ice hockey at the 2002 Winter Olympics =

Ice hockey at the XIX Olympic Winter Games
- Venue: E Center; Peaks Ice Arena
- Date: 9–24 February
- No. of events: 2 (1 men and 1 women)
- Competitors: 484 from 16 nations

Men's ice hockey at the XIX Olympic Winter Games

Medalists
1st place, gold medalist(s)		Canada
2nd place, silver medalist(s)		United States
3rd place, bronze medalist(s)		Russia

Women's ice hockey at the XIX Olympic Winter Games

Medalists
1st place, gold medalist(s)		Canada
2nd place, silver medalist(s)		United States
3rd place, bronze medalist(s)		Sweden

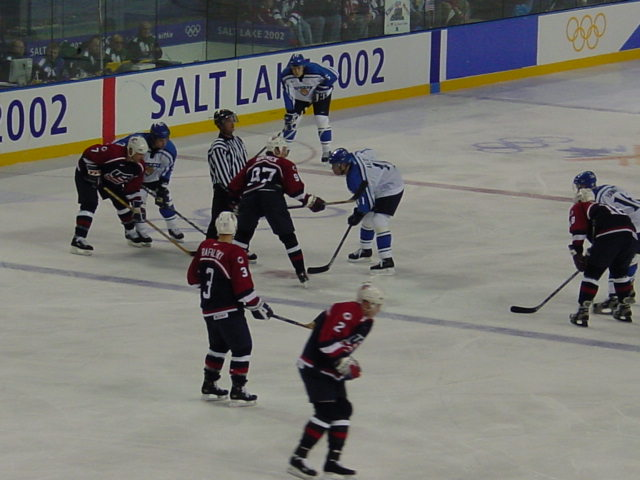
The United States and Finland men's teams during group play

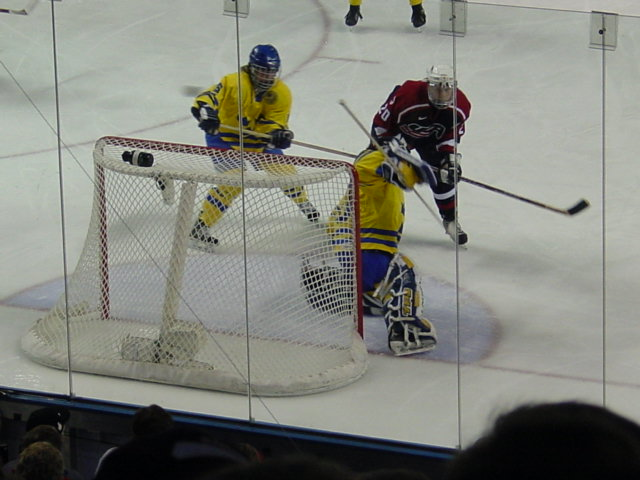
Sweden and the United States women's teams during the semifinals

Hockey at the 2002 Winter Olympics was held at the E Center in West Valley City and Peaks Ice Arena in Provo, Utah, United States. The men's and women's tournaments were won by Canada, defeating the hosts United States in both finals. Sweden won the bronze medal in the women's tournament and Russia in the men's tournament.

== Medal summary ==
=== Medal table ===
Rank	Nation	Gold	Silver	Bronze	Total
1	Canada	2	0	0	2
2	United States	0	2	0	2
3	Russia	0	0	1	1
3	Sweden	0	0	1	1
Totals (4 entries)		2	2	2	6

=== Medalists ===
Event	Gold	Silver	Bronze
Men's	Canada Ed Belfour; Rob Blake; Eric Brewer; Martin Brodeur; Theoren Fleury; Adam Foote; Simon Gagné; Jarome Iginla; Curtis Joseph; Ed Jovanovski; Paul Kariya; Mario Lemieux; Eric Lindros; Al MacInnis; Scott Niedermayer; Joe Nieuwendyk; Owen Nolan; Michael Peca; Chris Pronger; Joe Sakic; Brendan Shanahan; Ryan Smyth; Steve Yzerman	United States Tony Amonte; Tom Barrasso; Chris Chelios; Adam Deadmarsh; Chris Drury; Mike Dunham; Bill Guerin; Phil Housley; Brett Hull; John LeClair; Brian Leetch; Aaron Miller; Mike Modano; Tom Poti; Brian Rafalski; Mike Richter; Jeremy Roenick; Brian Rolston; Gary Suter; Keith Tkachuk; Doug Weight; Mike York; Scott Young	Russia Maxim Afinogenov; Ilya Bryzgalov; Pavel Bure; Valeri Bure; Pavel Datsyuk; Sergei Fedorov; Sergei Gonchar; Darius Kasparaitis; Nikolai Khabibulin; Ilya Kovalchuk; Alexei Kovalev; Igor Kravchuk; Oleg Kvasha; Igor Larionov; Vladimir Malakhov; Daniil Markov; Boris Mironov; Andrei Nikolishin; Yegor Podomatsky; Sergei Samsonov; Oleg Tverdovsky; Alexei Yashin; Alexey Zhamnov
Women's	Canada Dana Antal; Kelly Bechard; Jennifer Botterill; Thérèse Brisson; Cassie Campbell; Isabelle Chartrand; Lori Dupuis; Danielle Goyette; Geraldine Heaney; Jayna Hefford; Becky Kellar; Caroline Ouellette; Cherie Piper; Cheryl Pounder; Tammy Lee Shewchuk; Sami Jo Small; Colleen Sostorics; Kim St-Pierre; Vicky Sunohara; Hayley Wickenheiser	United States Chris Bailey; Laurie Baker; Karyn Bye; Julie Chu; Natalie Darwitz; Sara Decosta; Tricia Dunn; Cammi Granato; Courtney Kennedy; Andrea Kilbourne; Katie King; Shelley Looney; Sue Merz; Allison Mleczko; Tara Mounsey; Jenny Potter; Angela Ruggiero; Sarah Tueting; Lyndsay Wall; Krissy Wendell	Sweden Lotta Almblad; Anna Andersson; Gunilla Andersson; Annica Åhlén; Emelie Berggren; Kristina Bergstrand; Ann-Louise Edstrand; Joa Elfsberg; Erika Holst; Nanna Jansson; Maria Larsson; Ylva Lindberg; Ulrica Lindström; Kim Martin; Josefin Pettersson; Maria Rooth; Danijela Rundqvist; Evelina Samuelsson; Therese Sjölander; Anna Vikman

== Men's tournament ==
=== Qualifying ===
The final standings at the end of the 1999 IIHF World Championship were used to determine the path to the Olympic tournament. The top six places were given direct entry to the first round, places seven and eight were given direct entry to the preliminary round, and all other participants were seeded in qualifying tournaments to fill the remaining six spots. This chart shows the seeding path for all nations, in detail.

=== Final rankings ===
	Team
1st place, gold medalist(s)	Canada
2nd place, silver medalist(s)	United States
3rd place, bronze medalist(s)	Russia
4th	Belarus
5th	Sweden
6th	Finland
7th	Czech Republic
8th	Germany
9th	Latvia
10th	Ukraine
11th	Switzerland
12th	Austria
13th	Slovakia
14th	France

These standings are presented as the IIHF has them, however both the NHL and IOC maintain that all quarterfinal losers are ranked equal at 5th.

== Women's tournament ==
=== Qualification ===
The qualification process, and seedings for the Olympic tournament, came from the final standings of the 2000 IIHF Women's World Championship. The top six nations were given direct entry to the Olympics, the final two spots were contested in a qualification tournament. The nations ranked seven through ten played a round robin in Engelberg Switzerland February 8–11, 2001.

=== Format ===
The eight teams were split into two equal divisions. All teams played three preliminary games within their division. Following the completion of the preliminary round, the top two teams from each division advanced to the medal round and competed in a playoff to determine the gold medalist. The other four played classification games. Team rosters were allowed to have between 15 and 18 skaters (forwards and defensemen).

=== Participating nations ===
A total of eight national teams competed in the women's ice hockey tournament.

Group A	Group B
Canada; Sweden; Russia; Kazakhstan	United States; Finland; Germany; China

== See also ==
- Ice sledge hockey at the 2002 Winter Paralympics
