= Maria Larsson =

Maria Larsson may refer to:

- Maria Larsson (politician)
- Maria Larsson (curler)
- Maria Larsson (ice hockey)
- Maria Larsson (athlete)

== See also ==
- Maria Larssons eviga ögonblick, a 2008 Swedish drama film
