= 2002 Winter Olympics medal table =

2002 Winter Olympics medals
- Location: Salt Lake City, United States

Highlights
- Most gold medals: Norway (13)
- Most total medals: Germany (36)
- Medalling NOCs: 24

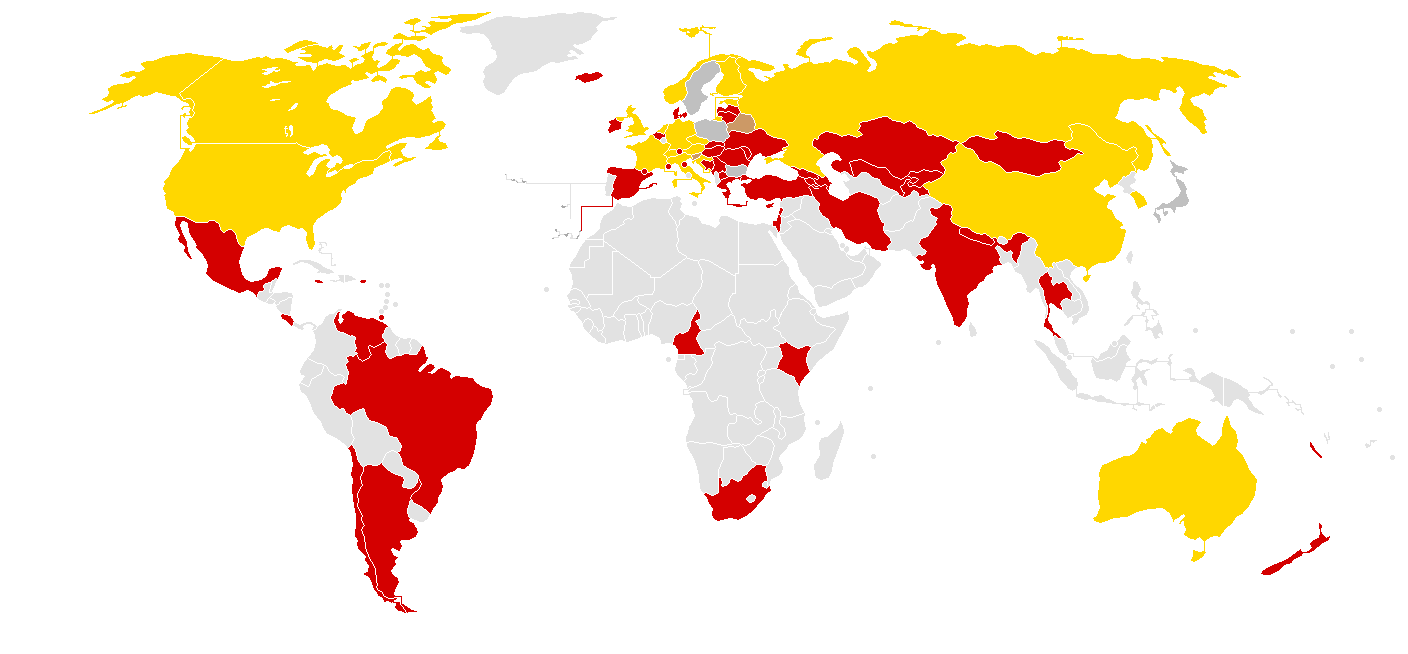
2002 Winter Olympic Games Medals map Legend: Gold represents countries that won at least one gold medal Silver represents countries that won at least one silver medal Bronze represents countries that won at least one bronze medal Red represents countries that did not win any medals Grey represents countries that did not participate

The 2002 Winter Olympics, officially known as the XIX Olympic Winter Games, was a winter multi-sport event held in Salt Lake City, Utah, United States, from February 8 to 24, 2002. A total of 2,399 athletes from 77 National Olympic Committees (NOCs; +5 from 1998 Olympics) participated in these Games, competing in 78 events (+10 from 1998) in 15 sports and disciplines (+1 from 1998).

Athletes from 24 countries won at least one medal. Germany led in overall medals (36) for the second consecutive Winter Games. Immediately following the Games, Germany was also the gold medal leader with twelve. With 36 total medals, Germany set a record for most total medals at a single Winter Olympics edition. Two years later, however, Norway was awarded two extra gold medals for a single event (where two Norwegians tied) after medal re-allocations, raising their total to thirteen and giving them the lead in gold medals (albeit not in the number of won events). In addition, Norway tied the former Soviet Union in 1976 for most gold medals at a single Winter Olympics. This record would later be broken by Canada at the 2010 Winter Olympics. The hosting United States was third in the medal table on both counts with a total of 34 medals.

Croatia and Estonia won the first medals and first gold medals in their Winter Olympic history, while Australia and China won their first gold medals. Biathlete Ole Einar Bjørndalen of Norway won four gold medals, while Croatian alpine skier Janica Kostelić won three golds and a silver, making them the two athletes with the most medals at the Games.

== Medal table ==
The medal table is based on information provided by the International Olympic Committee (IOC) and is consistent with IOC conventional sorting in its published medal tables. The table uses the Olympic medal table sorting method. By default, the table is ordered by the number of gold medals the athletes from a nation have won, where a nation is an entity represented by a NOC. The number of silver medals is taken into consideration next and then the number of bronze medals. If teams are still tied, equal ranking is given and they are listed alphabetically by their IOC country code.

2002 Winter Olympics medal table
Rank	Nation	Gold	Silver	Bronze	Total
1	Norway	13	5	7	25
2	Germany	12	16	8	36
3	United States*	10	13	11	34
4	Canada	7	3	7	17
5	Russia	5	4	4	13
6	France	4	5	2	11
7	Italy	4	4	5	13
8	Finland	4	2	1	7
9	Netherlands	3	5	0	8
10	Austria	3	4	10	17
11	Switzerland	3	2	6	11
12	Croatia	3	1	0	4
13	China	2	2	4	8
14	South Korea	2	2	0	4
15	Australia	2	0	0	2
16	Czech Republic	1	2	0	3
17	Estonia	1	1	1	3
18	Great Britain	1	0	1	2
19	Sweden	0	2	5	7
20	Bulgaria	0	1	2	3
21	Japan	0	1	1	2
21	Poland	0	1	1	2
23	Belarus	0	0	1	1
23	Slovenia	0	0	1	1
Totals (24 entries)		80	76	78	234

== Changes in medal standings ==
Due to various events, two extra gold medals were awarded. In the figure skating pairs competition, Yelena Berezhnaya and Anton Sikharulidze of Russia were originally awarded the gold over Jamie Salé and David Pelletier of Canada. In the ensuing controversy, it was revealed that French judge Marie-Reine Le Gougne had been pressured into voting for the Russians. Salé and Pelletier were later upgraded to gold, while Berezhnaya and Sikharulidze also kept their gold medals. In the cross-country skiing pursuit race, Norwegians Thomas Alsgaard and Frode Estil originally tied for a silver medal behind Spain's Johann Muehlegg. Muehlegg had won three gold medals but tested positive for darbepoetin after winning his third. He was originally allowed to keep the other two gold medals, but two years later was stripped of all medals by the Court of Arbitration for Sport.

In women's cross-country skiing, Larisa Lazutina of Russia originally won gold in the 30 km race, but tested positive for darbepoetin and was stripped of her medal, so Gabriella Paruzzi of Italy was awarded the gold, Italian Stefania Belmondo received the silver and Norwegian Bente Skari the bronze. Lazutina won two more medals, and was allowed to keep them until 2003 when she was stripped of them by the Court of Arbitration for sport. She also lost a silver medal in the 15 km race. In the 10 km pursuit, she was stripped of a silver, so Beckie Scott of Canada was promoted to the silver and Kateřina Neumannová of the Czech Republic the bronze. The gold medal in that race was won by Olga Danilova of Russia but she also tested positive for darbepoetin and in 2004, Scott was upgraded to gold, Neumannova to silver and Viola Bauer of Germany to bronze.

In the 10 km + 10 km combined pursuit, Frode Estil tied with fellow Norwegian Thomas Alsgaard for second place, with Johann Mühlegg (starting for Spain) winning the race. However, Mühlegg was found guilty of doping and disqualified by the IOC in February 2004, therefore upgrading Estil and Alsgaard to joint gold medalists. Alsgaard and Estil clocked times of 49:48.9, 4 seconds ahead of Per Elofsson. Both Germany and Norway won 12 events, but Norway collected two gold medals for a single event, thus overtaking Germany, which had been considered the 2002 medal tally winner for two years. Germany remained the nation with the most total medals.

Olympics	Athlete	Country	Medal	Event	Ref
2002 Winter Olympics	Alain Baxter (Note: The Court of Arbitration for Sport (CAS) upheld the IOC's decision to disqualify Baxter, but the CAS judgement found that "The panel is not without sympathy for Mr Baxter, who appears to be a sincere and honest man who did not intend to obtain a competitive advantage in the race." Nevertheless, they found that his offence had been committed and as such would not reinstate the medal. In December 2002, Austrian Benjamin Raich received the bronze medal.)	Great Britain	3rd place, bronze medalist(s)	Alpine Skiing, Men's slalom	
2002 Winter Olympics	Olga Danilova	Russia	1st place, gold medalist(s)	Cross-Country Skiing, Women's 5 km + 5 km combined pursuit	
2002 Winter Olympics	Olga Danilova	Russia	2nd place, silver medalist(s)	Cross-Country Skiing, Women's 10 km classical	
2002 Winter Olympics	Larisa Lazutina	Russia	1st place, gold medalist(s)	Cross-Country Skiing, Women's 30 km classical	
2002 Winter Olympics	Larisa Lazutina	Russia	2nd place, silver medalist(s)	Cross-Country Skiing, Women's 15 km freestyle mass start	
2002 Winter Olympics	Larisa Lazutina	Russia	2nd place, silver medalist(s)	Cross-Country Skiing, Women's 5 km + 5 km combined pursuit	
2002 Winter Olympics	Johann Mühlegg	Spain	1st place, gold medalist(s)	Cross-Country Skiing, Men's 50 km classical	
2002 Winter Olympics	Johann Mühlegg	Spain	1st place, gold medalist(s)	Cross-Country Skiing, Men's 30 km freestyle	
2002 Winter Olympics	Johann Mühlegg	Spain	1st place, gold medalist(s)	Cross-Country Skiing, Men's 10 km + 10 km combined pursuit	
