= Jenny Olsson =

Swedish cross-country skier

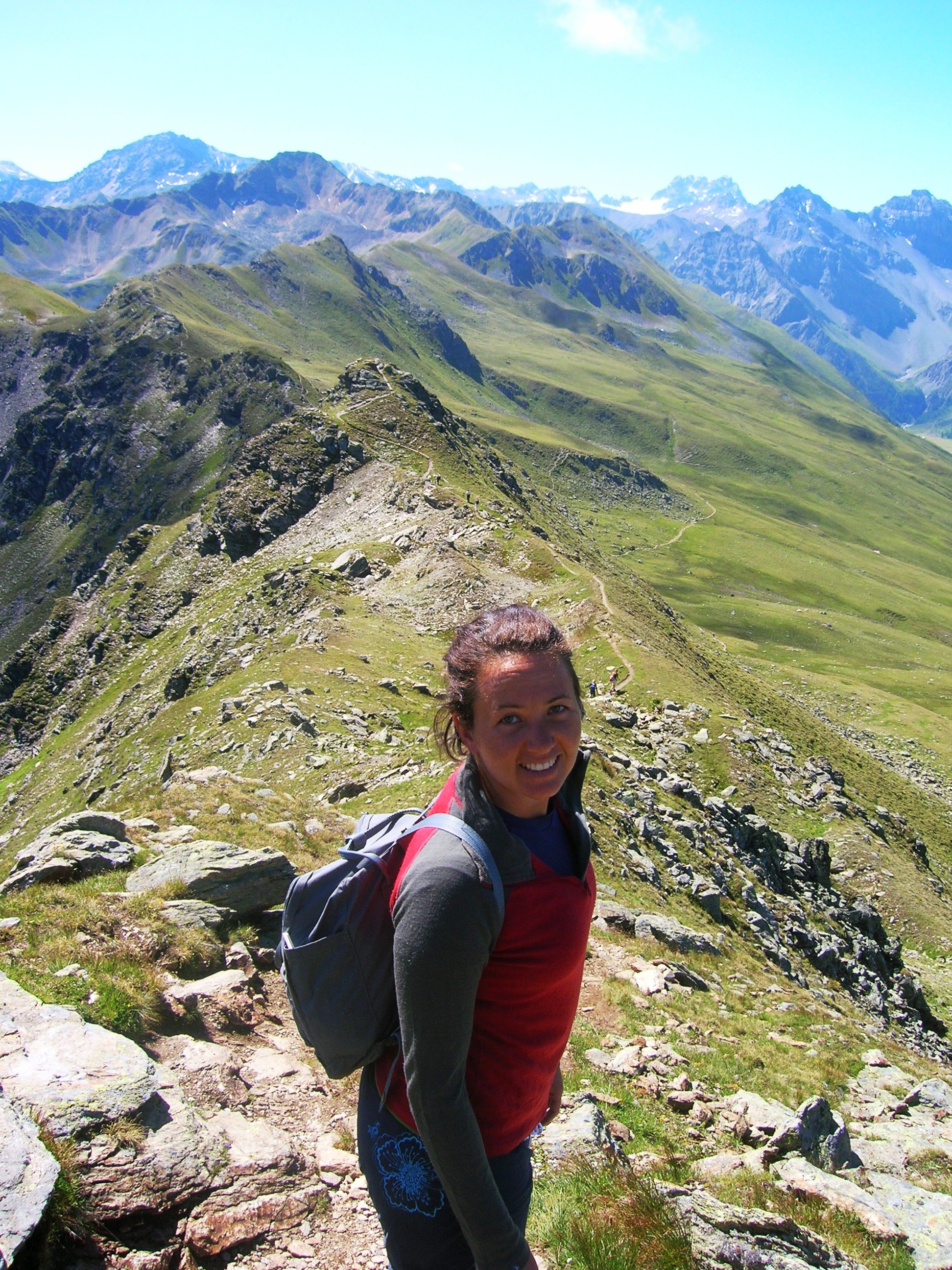

Personal information
- Full name: Jenny Karin Olsson
- Nationality: Sweden
- Born: 14 July 1979 Tumba, Sweden
- Died: 15 April 2012 (aged 32) Östersund, Sweden

Sport
- Sport: Skiing
- Club: Åsarna IK

World Cup career
- Seasons: 7 – (1998, 2000–2005)
- Indiv. starts: 48
- Indiv. podiums: 0
- Team starts: 15
- Team podiums: 1
- Team wins: 0
- Overall titles: 0 – (24th in 2003)
- Discipline titles: 0
Medal record
Women'scross-country skiing
Representing Sweden
Junior World Championships
Gold medal – first place	1998 Pontresina	4 × 5 km relay

Jenny Karin Olsson (14 July 1979 – 15 April 2012) was a Swedish cross-country skier. Her greatest international success was a fifth place in the 15 km race at the 2003 World championships in Val di Fiemme.

She also competed for Sweden at the 2002 Winter Olympics in Salt Lake City. Her best World cup season was 2002/2003 when she ended at a 23d place overall. She won several gold medals at the Swedish championships where she competed for her club Åsarna IK.

== Death ==
In 2005, Olsson was diagnosed with breast cancer and ended her skiing career the following year. She died on 15 April 2012, aged 32. She was survived by her husband and their two-year-old son.

== Cross-country skiing results ==
All results are sourced from the International Ski Federation (FIS).

=== Olympic Games ===
Year	Age	10 km	15 km	Pursuit	30 km	Sprint	4 × 5 km relay
2002	22	22	39	35	—	—	12

=== World Championships ===
Year	Age	10 km	15 km	Pursuit	30 km	Sprint	4 × 5 km relay	Team sprint
2001	21	31	—	23	CNX^{[a]}	—	5	—N/a
2003	23	32	5	14	34	—	6	—N/a
2005	25	37	—N/a	32	—	—	—	—

a. ^{1} Cancelled due to extremely cold weather.

=== World Cup ===
==== Season standings ====
Season	Age					
Season	Age	Overall	Distance	Long Distance	Middle Distance	Sprint
1998	19	NC	—N/a	NC	—N/a	—
2000	21	NC	—N/a	NC	NC	NC
2001	22	62	—N/a	—N/a	—N/a	—
2002	23	73	—N/a	—N/a	—N/a	—
2003	24	24	—N/a	—N/a	—N/a	NC
2004	25	65	46	—N/a	—N/a	—
2005	26	NC	NC	—N/a	—N/a	—

==== Team podiums ====
- 1 podium – (1 RL)

No.	Season	Date	Location	Race	Level	Place	Teammates
1	2001–02	27 November 2001	Kuopio, Finland	4 × 5 km Relay C/F	World Cup	3rd	Andersson / Ek / Dahlberg
