= Anna Olsson (cross-country skier) =

Swedish cross-country skier

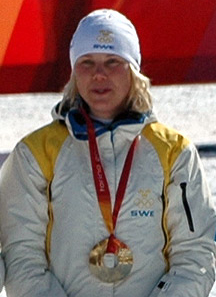
- Anna Olsson

Personal information
- Full name: Anna Viktoria Olsson
- Nationality: Sweden
- Born: 1 May 1976 (age 50) Kramfors, Sweden
- Height: 1.65 m (5 ft 5 in)
- Spouse: Johan Olsson (m. 2008)

Sport
- Sport: Skiing
- Club: Åsarna IK

World Cup career
- Seasons: 13 – (1997–1998, 2000–2010)
- Indiv. starts: 100
- Indiv. podiums: 14
- Indiv. wins: 2
- Team starts: 29
- Team podiums: 6
- Team wins: 1
- Overall titles: 0 – (11th in 2005)
- Discipline titles: 0
Medal record
Women's cross-country skiing
Representing Sweden
Event	1st	2nd	3rd
Olympic Games	1	0	0
World Championships	0	1	0
Total	1	1	0
Olympic Games
Gold medal – first place	2006 Turin	Team sprint
World Championships
Silver medal – second place	2009 Liberec	Team sprint

Anna Olsson (née Dahlberg; born 1 May 1976) is a Swedish cross-country skier who competed from 1996 to 2010. Competing in three Winter Olympics, she won a gold medal in the team sprint (with Lina Andersson) at Turin in 2006.

Olsson also won a silver medal in the team sprint event at the FIS Nordic World Ski Championships 2009 in Liberec. She also has twenty individual victories at all levels at various distances since 2000.

She married fellow skier Johan Olsson in 2008.

== Cross-country skiing results ==
All results are sourced from the International Ski Federation (FIS).

=== Olympic Games ===
- 1 medal – (1 gold)

Year	Age	10 km individual	15 km mass start	Pursuit	30 km	Sprint	4 × 5 km relay	Team sprint
2002	25	40	36	—	39	33	12	—N/a
2006	29	—	—N/a	—	—	10	4	Gold
2010	33	24	—N/a	—	9	4	5	—

=== World Championships ===
- 1 medal – (1 silver)

Year	Age	5 km	10 km	15 km	Pursuit	30 km	Sprint	4 × 5 km relay	Team sprint
1997	20	—	—N/a	47	—	—	—N/a	—	—N/a
2001	24	—N/a	—	—	43	CNX^{[a]}	26	—	—N/a
2003	26	—N/a	23	—	—	—	22	6	—N/a
2005	28	—N/a	—	—N/a	—	DNS	4	8	9
2007	30	—N/a	20	—N/a	—	—	4	4	—
2009	32	—N/a	12	—N/a	—	—	5	—	Silver

a. ^{1} Cancelled due to extremely cold weather.

=== World Cup ===
==== Season standings ====
Season	Age	Discipline standings					Ski Tour standings	
Season	Age	Overall	Distance	Long Distance	Middle Distance	Sprint	Tour de Ski	World Cup Final
1997	21	NC	—N/a	NC	—N/a	—	—N/a	—N/a
1998	22	NC	—N/a	NC	—N/a	—	—N/a	—N/a
2000	24	NC	—N/a	—	NC	—	—N/a	—N/a
2001	25	NC	—N/a	—N/a	—N/a	—	—N/a	—N/a
2002	26	34	—N/a	—N/a	—N/a	17	—N/a	—N/a
2003	27	43	—N/a	—N/a	—N/a	19	—N/a	—N/a
2004	28	15	32	—N/a	—N/a	3rd place, bronze medalist(s)	—N/a	—N/a
2005	29	11	66	—N/a	—N/a	3rd place, bronze medalist(s)	—N/a	—N/a
2006	30	20	58	—N/a	—N/a	6	—N/a	—N/a
2007	31	21	48	—N/a	—N/a	5	—	—N/a
2008	32	42	—	—N/a	—N/a	28	—	—
2009	33	16	32	—N/a	—N/a	8	—	5
2010	34	19	33	—N/a	—N/a	14	—	8

==== Individual podiums ====
- 2 victories – (1 WC, 1 SWC)
- 14 podiums – (12 WC, 2 SWC)

No.	Season	Date	Location	Race	Level	Place
1	2003–04	16 December 2003	Val di Fiemme, Italy	1.2 km Sprint C	World Cup	2nd
2	2003–04	18 February 2004	Stockholm, Sweden	1.1 km Sprint C	World Cup	2nd
3	2003–04	5 March 2004	Lahti, Finland	1.0 km Sprint F	World Cup	3rd
4	2004–05	23 October 2004	Düsseldorf, Germany	0.8 km Sprint F	World Cup	2nd
5	2004–05	13 February 2005	Reit im Winkl, Germany	1.5 km Sprint C	World Cup	3rd
6	2004–05	9 March 2005	Drammen, Norway	1.0 km Sprint C	World Cup	3rd
7	2005–06	30 December 2005	Nové Město, Czech Republic	1.2 km Sprint F	World Cup	2nd
8	2005–06	4 February 2006	Davos, Switzerland	1.0 km Sprint F	World Cup	1st
9	2006–07	10 March 2007	Lahti, Finland	1.2 km Sprint F	World Cup	3rd
10	2006–07	21 March 2007	Stockholm, Sweden	1.0 km Sprint C	World Cup	3rd
11	2007–08	27 October 2007	Düsseldorf, Germany	0.8 km Sprint F	World Cup	2nd
12	2008–09	16 January 2009	Whistler, Canada	1.2 km Sprint C	World Cup	3rd
13	2008–09	18 March 2009	Stockholm, Sweden	1.0 km Sprint C	Stage World Cup	3rd
14	2009–10	17 March 2010	Stockholm, Sweden	1.1 km Sprint C	Stage World Cup	1st

==== Team podiums ====
- 1 victory – (1 RL)
- 6 podiums – (3 RL, 3 TS)

No.	Season	Date	Location	Race	Level	Place	Teammate(s)
1	2001–02	27 November 2001	Kuopio, Finland	4 × 5 km Relay C/F	World Cup	3rd	Andersson / Ek / Olsson
2	2004–05	15 December 2004	Asiago, Italy	6 × 1.2 km Team Sprint C	World Cup	3rd	Ek
3	2004–05	23 January 2005	Pragelato, Italy	6 × 1.2 km Team Sprint C	World Cup	2nd	Öhrstig
4	2006–07	25 March 2007	Falun, Sweden	4 × 5 km Relay C/F	World Cup	3rd	Rydqvist / Norgren / Kalla
5	2008–09	18 January 2009	Whistler, Canada	6 × 1.3 km Team Sprint F	World Cup	3rd	Andersson
6	2009–10	22 November 2009	Beitostølen, Norway	4 × 5 km Relay C/F	World Cup	1st	Haag / Lindborg / Kalla
