= FIS Nordic World Ski Championships 2005 – Women's sprint =

Women's sprint at the FIS Nordic World Ski Championships 2005
- Venue: Oberstdorf
- Date: 22 February 2005
- Competitors: 73

Medalists
| gold medal | Emelie Öhrstig | Sweden |
| silver medal | Lina Andersson | Sweden |
| bronze medal | Sara Renner | Canada |

The women's team sprint cross-country skiing competition at the FIS Nordic World Ski Championships 2005 was held on 22 February 2005 in Oberstdorf, Germany.

== Results ==
=== Qualification ===
73 competitors started the qualification race.

| Rank | Bib | Athlete | Country | Time | Deficit | Note |
|---|---|---|---|---|---|---|
| 1 | 35 | Emelie Öhrstig | Sweden | 2:17.72 | — | Q |
| 2 | 20 | Lina Andersson | Sweden | 2:19.96 | +2.24 | Q |
| 3 | 36 | Anna Dahlberg | Sweden | 2:20.41 | +2.69 | Q |
| 4 | 32 | Ella Gjømle | Norway | 2:21.68 | +3.96 | Q |
| 5 | 40 | Beckie Scott | Canada | 2:21.95 | +4.23 | Q |
| 6 | 23 | Mona-Liisa Malvalehto | Finland | 2:22.29 | +4.57 | Q |
| 7 | 33 | Olga Zavyalova | Russia | 2:22.85 | +5.13 | Q |
| 8 | 37 | Virpi Kuitunen | Finland | 2:23.00 | +5.28 | Q |
| 9 | 31 | Claudia Künzel | Germany | 2:23.10 | +5.38 | Q |
| 10 | 41 | Guro Strøm Solli | Norway | 2:23.42 | +5.70 | Q |
| 11 | 25 | Manuela Henkel | Germany | 2:23.44 | +5.72 | Q |
| 12 | 27 | Sara Renner | Canada | 2:23.48 | +5.76 | Q |
| 13 | 39 | Viola Bauer | Germany | 2:23.71 | +5.99 | Q |
| 14 | 38 | Petra Majdič | Slovenia | 2:24.11 | +6.39 | Q |
| 15 | 34 | Aino-Kaisa Saarinen | Finland | 2:24.16 | +6.44 | Q |
| | 16 | Justyna Kowalczyk | Poland | DSQ | | Q |
| 16 | 28 | Marit Bjørgen | Norway | 2:24.82 | +7.10 | |
| 17 | 47 | Alena Procházková | Slovakia | 2:25.45 | +7.73 | |
| 18 | 26 | Stephanie Böhler | Germany | 2:25.66 | +7.94 | |
| 19 | 13 | Oxana Yatskaya | Kazakhstan | 2:26.04 | +8.32 | |
| 20 | 18 | Larisa Kurkina | Russia | 2:26.18 | +8.46 | |
| 21 | 12 | Milaine Thériault | Canada | 2:26.48 | +8.76 | |
| 22 | 29 | Kirsi Välimaa | Finland | 2:26.54 | +8.82 | |
| 23 | 43 | Wendy Kay Wagner | United States | 2:26.59 | +8.87 | |
| 24 | 42 | Christina Kelder | Italy | 2:26.64 | +8.92 | |
| 25 | 14 | Elin Ek | Sweden | 2:26.70 | +8.98 | |
| 26 | 71 | Elena Antonova | Kazakhstan | 2:26.80 | +9.08 | |
| 27 | 57 | Kine Beate Bjørnås | Norway | 2:27.36 | +9.64 | |
| 28 | 24 | Natalya Korostelyova | Russia | 2:27.67 | +9.95 | |
| 29 | 5 | Kikkan Randall | United States | 2:28.36 | +10.64 | |
| 30 | 7 | Élodie Bourgeois-Pin | France | 2:28.71 | +10.99 | |
| 31 | 19 | Madoka Natsumi | Japan | 2:28.78 | +11.06 | |
| 32 | 17 | Olga Zavyalova | Russia | 2:29.62 | +11.90 | |
| 33 | 22 | Seraina Mischol | Switzerland | 2:29.77 | +12.05 | |
| 34 | 46 | Vesna Fabjan | Slovenia | 2:30.30 | +12.58 | |
| 35 | 11 | Nobuko Fukuda | Japan | 2:30.55 | +12.83 | |
| 36 | 48 | Elena Kolomina | Kazakhstan | 2:30.94 | +13.22 | |
| 37 | 21 | Vibeke Skofterud | Norway | 2:30.95 | +13.23 | |
| 38 | 2 | Silja Suija | Estonia | 2:31.60 | +13.88 | |
| 39 | 9 | Olga Vasiljonok | Belarus | 2:31.85 | +14.13 | |
| 40 | 55 | Helena Erbenová | Czech Republic | 2:32.00 | +14.28 | |
| ... | ... | ... | ... | ... | ... | |
| 71 | 72 | Franziska Becskehazy | Brazil | 4:24.31 | +2:06.59 | |
| | 68 | Meri Hakobyan | Armenia | | | |

=== Quarterfinals ===
Q - Qualified for next round
PF - Photo Finish

==== Quarterfinal 1 ====
| Rank | Seed | Athlete | Country | Time | Deficit | Note |
|---|---|---|---|---|---|---|
| 1 | 1 | Emelie Öhrstig | Sweden | 2:16.6 | — | Q |
| 2 | 8 | Virpi Kuitunen | Finland | 2:17.2 | +0.6 | Q |
| 3 | 16 | Justyna Kowalczyk | Poland | 2:18.5 | +1.9 | DSQ |
| 4 | 9 | Claudia Künzel | Germany | 2:18.8 | +2.2 | 14th |

==== Quarterfinal 2 ====
| Rank | Seed | Athlete | Country | Time | Deficit | Note |
|---|---|---|---|---|---|---|
| 1 | 13 | Viola Bauer | Germany | 2:17.5 | — | Q |
| 2 | 12 | Sara Renner | Canada | 2:19.0 | +1.5 | Q |
| 3 | 4 | Ella Gjømle | Norway | 2:20.0 | +2.5 | 9th |
| 4 | 5 | Beckie Scott | Canada | 2:20.8 | +3.3 | 12th |

==== Quarterfinal 3 ====
| Rank | Seed | Athlete | Country | Time | Deficit | Note |
|---|---|---|---|---|---|---|
| 1 | 2 | Lina Andersson | Sweden | 2:17.9 | — | Q |
| 2 | 15 | Aino-Kaisa Saarinen | Finland | 2:18.3 | +0.4 | Q PF |
| 3 | 10 | Guro Strøm Solli | Norway | 2:18.4 | +0.5 | 10th PF |
| 4 | 7 | Alyona Sidko | Russia | 2:19.8 | +1.9 | 13th |

==== Quarterfinal 4 ====
| Rank | Seed | Athlete | Country | Time | Deficit | Note |
|---|---|---|---|---|---|---|
| 1 | 3 | Anna Dahlberg | Sweden | 2:18.3 | — | Q |
| 2 | 6 | Mona-Liisa Malvalehto | Finland | 2:18.6 | +0.3 | Q |
| 3 | 11 | Manuela Henkel | Germany | 2:20.0 | +1.7 | 11th |
| 4 | 14 | Petra Majdič | Slovenia | 2:21.3 | +3.0 | 15th |

=== Semifinals ===
==== Semifinal 1 ====
| Rank | Seed | Athlete | Country | Time | Deficit | Note |
|---|---|---|---|---|---|---|
| 1 | 1 | Emelie Öhrstig | Sweden | 2:18.3 | — | QA |
| 2 | 12 | Sara Renner | Canada | 2:19.1 | +0.8 | QA |
| 3 | 13 | Viola Bauer | Germany | 2:19.9 | +1.6 | QB |
| 4 | 8 | Virpi Kuitunen | Finland | 2:20.6 | +2.3 | QB |

==== Semifinal 2 ====
| Rank | Seed | Athlete | Country | Time | Deficit | Note |
|---|---|---|---|---|---|---|
| 1 | 2 | Lina Andersson | Sweden | 2:17.8 | — | QA |
| 2 | 3 | Anna Dahlberg | Sweden | 2:18.0 | +0.2 | QA |
| 3 | 6 | Mona-Liisa Malvalehto | Finland | 2:20.3 | +2.5 | QB |
| 4 | 15 | Aino-Kaisa Saarinen | Finland | 2:21.3 | +3.5 | QB |

=== Finals ===
==== Final A ====
| Rank | Seed | Athlete | Country | Time | Deficit | Note |
|---|---|---|---|---|---|---|
| 1st place, gold medalist(s) | 1 | Emelie Öhrstig | Sweden | 2:15.5 | — | 1st |
| 2nd place, silver medalist(s) | 2 | Lina Andersson | Sweden | 2:16.8 | +1.3 | 2nd PF |
| 3rd place, bronze medalist(s) | 12 | Sara Renner | Canada | 2:16.9 | +1.4 | 3rd PF |
| 4 | 3 | Anna Dahlberg | Sweden | 2:17.9 | +2.4 | 4th |

==== Final B ====
| Rank | Seed | Athlete | Country | Time | Deficit | Note |
|---|---|---|---|---|---|---|
| 1 | 8 | Virpi Kuitunen | Finland | 2:21.3 | — | 5th PF |
| 2 | 13 | Viola Bauer | Germany | 2:21.3 | +0.0 | 6th PF |
| 3 | 6 | Mona-Liisa Malvalehto | Finland | 2:22.1 | +0.8 | 7th |
| 4 | 15 | Aino-Kaisa Saarinen | Finland | 2:22.5 | +1.2 | 8th |
