= Elin Ek (cross-country skier) =

Swedish cross-country skier (born 1973)

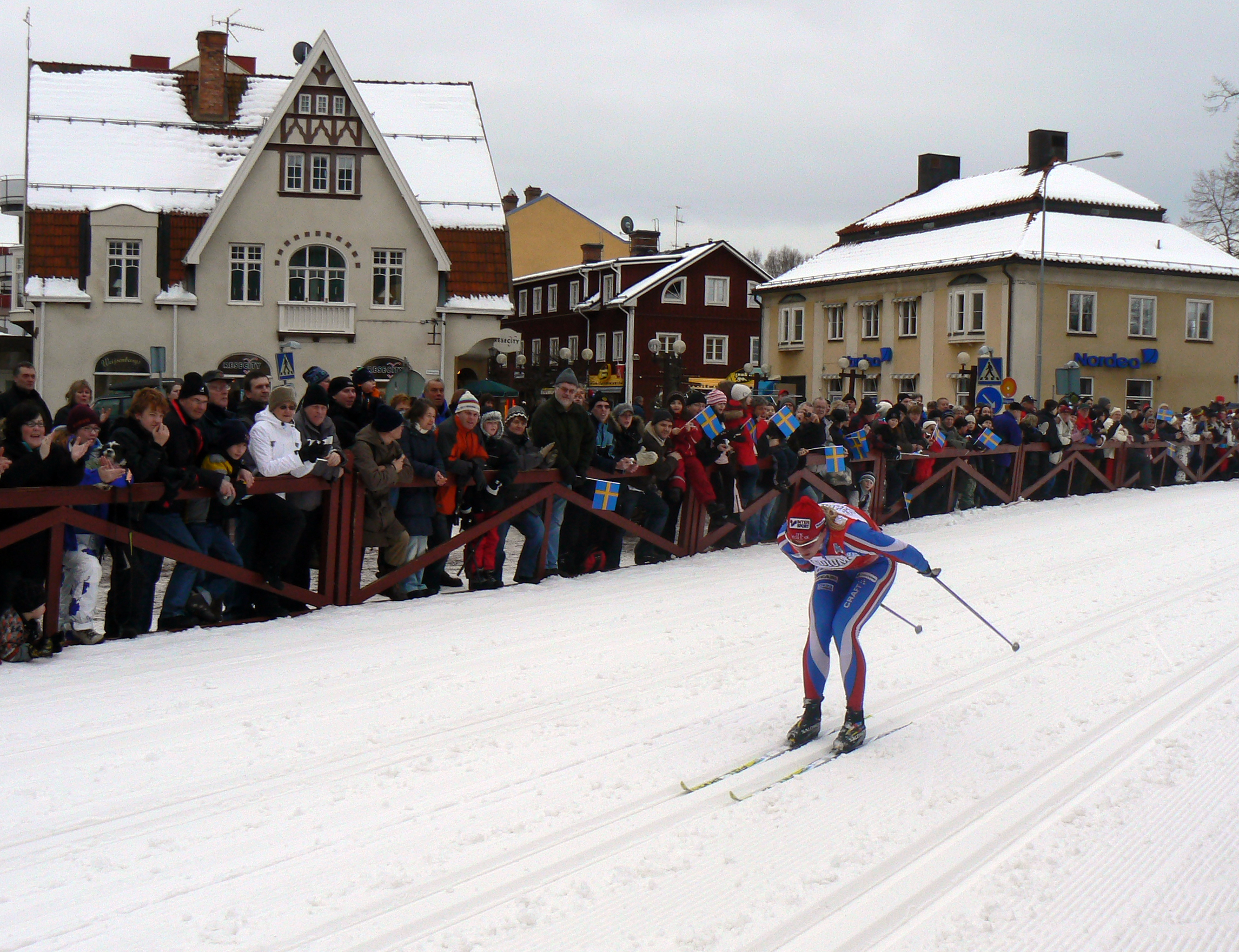
- Elin Ek skiing towards her 2007 Vasaloppet main women's competition victory

Personal information
- Full name: Elin Maria Ek
- Nationality: Sweden
- Born: 31 August 1973 By, Dalecarlia, Sweden

Sport
- Sport: Skiing
- Club: IFK Mora SK

World Cup career
- Seasons: 14 – (1994–2007)
- Indiv. starts: 114
- Indiv. podiums: 0
- Team starts: 26
- Team podiums: 2
- Team wins: 0
- Overall titles: 0 – (21st in 2004)
- Discipline titles: 0
Medal record
Women's cross-country skiing
Representing Sweden
Junior World Championships
Silver medal – second place	1993 Harrachov	4 × 5 km relay
Bronze medal – third place	1992 Vuokatti	4 × 5 km relay

Elin Ek (born 31 August 1973 in By, Sweden) is a Swedish cross-country skier. She participated at the 1998 Olympic Winter Games in Nagano, the 2002 Olympic Winter Games in Salt Lake City and the 2006 Olympic Winter Games in Turin. Elin won the Tjejvasan in 1999 and 2006. and the Vasaloppet main women's event in 2007. She also won the women's Worldloppet in the 2006/2007 season.

She won the Swedish National Championships at the distances of 10 kilometers in 2006, 30 kilometers in 2003 and 2004, and pursuit in 2003 and 2004, skiathlon in 2007 and sprint in 2003. In 2008, she was also part of IFK Mora SK's team, winning the relay event.

== Cross-country skiing results ==
All results are sourced from the International Ski Federation (FIS).

=== Olympic Games ===
Year	Age	5 km	10 km	15 km	Pursuit	30 km	Sprint	4 × 5 km relay	Team sprint
1998	24	43	—N/a	35	DNS	—	—N/a	—	—N/a
2002	28	—N/a	19	38	25	25	35	12	—N/a
2006	32	—N/a	23	—N/a	31	—	—	4	—

=== World Championships ===
Year	Age	5 km	10 km	15 km	Pursuit	30 km	Sprint	4 × 5 km relay	Team sprint
1995	21	—	—N/a	—	—	40	—N/a	—	—N/a
1997	23	—	—N/a	—	—	25	—N/a	—	—N/a
2001	27	—N/a	14	16	24	CNX^{[a]}	—	5	—N/a
2003	29	—N/a	17	10	19	16	—	6	—N/a
2005	31	—N/a	—	—N/a	24	13	25	8	—

a. ^{1} Cancelled due to extremely cold weather.

=== World Cup ===
==== Season standings ====
Season	Age	Discipline standings					Ski Tour standings
Season	Age	Overall	Distance	Long Distance	Middle Distance	Sprint	Tour de Ski
1994	21	NC	—N/a	—N/a	—N/a	—N/a	—N/a
1995	22	78	—N/a	—N/a	—N/a	—N/a	—N/a
1996	23	39	—N/a	—N/a	—N/a	—N/a	—N/a
1997	24	64	—N/a	NC	—N/a	59	—N/a
1998	25	47	—N/a	40	—N/a	43	—N/a
1999	26	NC	—N/a	NC	—N/a	—	—N/a
2000	27	NC	—N/a	—	NC	NC	—N/a
2001	28	83	—N/a	—N/a	—N/a	—	—N/a
2002	29	86	—N/a	—N/a	—N/a	57	—N/a
2003	30	29	—N/a	—N/a	—N/a	37	—N/a
2004	31	21	18	—N/a	—N/a	35	—N/a
2005	32	42	34	—N/a	—N/a	33	—N/a
2006	33	28	22	—N/a	—N/a	43	—N/a
2007	34	NC	NC	—N/a	—N/a	—	—

==== Team podiums ====
- 2 podiums – (1 RL, 1 TS)

No.	Season	Date	Location	Race	Level	Place	Teammate(s)
1	2001–02	27 November 2001	Kuopio, Finland	4 × 5 km Relay C/F	World Cup	3rd	Andersson / Dahlberg / Olsson
2	2004–05	15 December 2004	Asiago, Italy	6 × 1.2 km Team Sprint C	World Cup	3rd	Dahlberg
