= Evelina Samuelsson =

Swedish ice hockey player

- Born: 14 March 1984 (age 42) Märsta, Sweden
- Height: 5 ft 3 in (160 cm)
- Weight: 132 lb (60 kg; 9 st 6 lb)
- Position: Left wing
- Shoots: Left
- Played for: AIK Hockey
- National team: Sweden

Evelina Samuelsson
Medal record

Women's ice hockey

Representing Sweden

Olympic Games
Bronze medal – third place	2002 Salt Lake City	

World Championships
Bronze medal – third place	2005 Sweden	

Evelina Louise Samuelsson (born 14 March 1984 in Stockholm, Sweden) is an ice hockey player from Sweden. She won a bronze medal at the 2002 Winter Olympics.

== See also ==
- Sweden at the 2002 Winter Olympics
