= Cross-country skiing at the 2002 Winter Olympics – Women's 2 × 5 kilometre pursuit =

Women’s 2 × 5 kilometre pursuit at the XIX Olympic Winter Games
- Venue: Soldier Hollow
- Dates: 15 February 2002
- Competitors: 73 from 27 nations
- Winning time: 25:09.9

Medalists
1st place, gold medalist(s)		Beckie Scott; Canada
2nd place, silver medalist(s)		Kateřina Neumannová; Czech Republic
3rd place, bronze medalist(s)		Viola Bauer; Germany

The 2 × 5 kilometre pursuit cross-country skiing competition at the 2002 Winter Olympics in Salt Lake City, United States, was held on 15 February at Soldier Hollow.

This competition consisted of two races. The first race was a 5 kilometre classical race and the second was a 5 km freestyle pursuit where the competitors started based on their times from the classical race. The winner was the first competitor to cross the finish line in the second race.

== Background ==
At the previous Olympics, the gold Larisa Lazutina, silver, Olga Danilova, and bronze, Kateřina Neumannová, medalists all qualified for the event. Neumannová was the overall leader in the World Cup standings prior to the Olympics. Virpi Kuitunen was the 2001 world champion.

== The race ==
This event was changed in 2002 as the short-distance classical event no longer was used as the first section of the event. Rather the event was skied in two sections on the same day, with classical skied first, followed by the freestyle pursuit, both sections now over 5 km. The morning classical leg was won by Olga Danilova with her teammate Larisa Lazutina in second. They had a lead of over seven seconds on Slovenian Petra Majdič. The Russians were not as strong in the freestyle, but still won the gold and silver medals easily, Danilova seven seconds ahead of Lazutina, who was 10 seconds ahead of Beckie Scott. The battle for the bronze was very close. Canadian Scott had been sixth in the classical section, with Czech skier Kateřina Neumannová in eighth, trailing Scott by 10.1 seconds. But Neumannová closed on Scott by the last kilometer but could never pass her, Scott holding on to make the podium.

In October 2003 it was confirmed that Danilova had tested positive for darbepoetin, an erythropoietin analogue, and was disqualified. Later Lazutina was also found to have tested positive for darbepoetin, and was disqualified. At the end of 2003, Beckie Scott was awarded the gold medal. Neumannová being moved up to silver, and the bronze medal going to German Viola Bauer. This was the first ever gold medal for Canada in Nordic skiing.

== Results ==
The 5 km classical race was started at 09:00 and 5 km freestyle pursuit at 11:30.

Rank	Bib	Name	Country	5 km classic	Rank	Start	5 km free	Rank	Finish time	Deficit
1st place, gold medalist(s)	67	Beckie Scott	Canada	13:17.5	6	0:18	11:52.9	8	25:09.9	
2nd place, silver medalist(s)	56	Kateřina Neumannová	Czech Republic	13:27.6	8	0:28	11:43.0	3	25:10.0	+0.1
3rd place, bronze medalist(s)	53	Viola Bauer	Germany	13:15.3	5	0:16	11:56.1	10	25:11.1	+1.2
4	58	Yuliya Chepalova	Russia	13:30.0	9	0:31	11:41.3	2	25:11.3	+1.4
5	?	Nina Gavrylyuk	Russia	13:26.8	7	0:28	11:47.5	6	25:13.5	+3.6
6	60	Bente Skari	Norway	13:11.7	4	0:13	12:03.2	18	25:14.2	+4.3
7	?	Petra Majdič	Slovenia	13:06.1	3	0:07	12:10.5	21	25:16.5	+6.6
8	68	Gabriella Paruzzi	Italy	13:33.9	10	0:35	11:45.6	5	25:18.6	+8.7
9	55	Sabina Valbusa	Italy	13:41.9	12	0:43	11:41.1	1	25:22.1	+12.2
10	32	Iryna Terelya	Ukraine	13:43.7	14	0:45	11:50.6	7	25:33.6	+23.7
11	61	Stefania Belmondo	Italy	13:50.4	19	0:51	11:45.3	4	25:35.3	+25.4
12	70	Kaisa Varis	Finland	13:37.9	11	0:39	11:59.0	13	25:36.0	+26.1
13	65	Kristina Šmigun	Estonia	13:51.5	21	0:52	11:57.6	12	25:48.6	+38.7
14	59	Hilde Gjermundshaug Pedersen	Norway	13:44.7	15	0:46	12:22.0	34	26:06.0	+56.1
15	37	Oxana Yatskaya	Kazakhstan	13:48.3	16	0:49	12:21.0	32	26:09.0	+59.1
16	66	Kati Sundqvist	Finland	13:54.4	23	0:55	12:16.1	27	26:10.1	+1:00.2
17	31	Sara Renner	Canada	13:57.3	26	0:58	12:13.3	23	26:10.3	+1:00.4
18	54	Evi Sachenbacher	Germany	14:05.4	31	1:06	12:06.0	19	26:11.0	+1:01.1
19	30	Karine Philippot	France	14:12.9	37	1:14	11:59.0	13	26:11.0	+1:01.1
20	48	Manuela Henkel	Germany	13:49.8	18	0:51	12:22.4	35	26:11.4	+1:01.5
21	64	Valentyna Shevchenko	Ukraine	13:48.7	17	0:50	12:23.4	36	26:11.4	+1:01.5
22	46	Laurence Rochat	Switzerland	13:57.1	25	0:58	12:14.8	25	26:11.8	+1:01.9
23	29	Nataša Lačen	Slovenia	14:14.7	38	1:16	12:00.1	15	26:14.1	+1:04.2
24	34	Svetlana Shishkina	Kazakhstan	14:00.6	28	1:01	12:15.0	26	26:15.0	+1:05.1
25	35	Elin Ek	Sweden	14:01.6	30	1:02	12:17.3	30	26:18.3	+1:08.4
26	?	Tina Bay	Norway	13:53.7	22	0:55	12:29.7	37	26:22.7	+1:12.8
27	40	Sumiko Yokoyama	Japan	14:22.4	46	1:23	12:01.3	17	26:23.3	+1:13.4
28	62	Vibeke Skofterud	Norway	14:12.3	36	1:13	12:14.7	24	26:26.7	+1:16.8
29	23	Brigitte Albrecht-Loretan	Switzerland	14:30.0	50	1:31	11:57.3	11	26:27.3	+1:17.4
30	39	Nina Kemppel	United States	13:58.1	27	0:59	12:29.8	38	26:27.8	+1:17.9
31	26	Aurelie Storti	France	14:06.0	32	1:07	12:21.9	33	26:27.9	+1:18.0
32	47	Vera Zyatikova	Belarus	14:15.2	39	1:16	12:13.0	22	26:28.0	+1:18.1
33	19	Milaine Thériault	Canada	13:57.0	24	0:58	12:32.1	40	26:29.1	+1:19.2
34	44	Nataliya Zyatikova	Belarus	14:23.5	47	1:24	12:06.4	20	26:29.4	+1:19.5
35	16	Jenny Olsson	Sweden	14:00.7	29	1:02	12:29.8	38	26:29.8	+1:19.9
36	28	Satu Salonen	Finland	13:43.4	13	0:44	12:49.5	45	26:32.5	+1:22.6
37	10	Annick Pierrel	France	14:18.6	42	1:19	12:16.1	27	26:34.1	+1:24.2
38	45	Kanoko Goto	Japan	14:16.1	40	1:17	12:19.6	31	26:35.6	+1:25.7
39	63	Lina Andersson	Sweden	13:50.6	20	0:51	12:45.7	43	26:35.7	+1:25.8
40	?	Elina Pienimäki-Hietamäki	Finland	14:21.3	45	1:22	12:16.7	29	26:37.7	+1:27.8
41	21	Teja Gregorin	Slovenia	14:20.7	44	1:22	12:43.6	42	27:03.6	+1:53.7
42	5	Helena Balatková	Czech Republic	14:20.6	43	1:21	12:45.8	44	27:05.8	+1:55.9
43	11	Svetlana Deshevykh	Kazakhstan	14:16.2	41	1:17	12:51.7	46	27:07.7	+1:57.8
44	25	Yuxia Hou	China	14:26.3	48	1:27	12:43.3	41	27:09.3	+1:59.4
45	42	Kamila Rajdlová	Czech Republic	14:11.1	35	1:12	12:58.6	48	27:09.6	+1:59.7
46	4	Anna-Carin Olofsson	Sweden	14:28.3	49	1:29	12:52.7	47	27:20.7	+2:10.8
47	24	Elena Antonova	Kazakhstan	14:06.6	33	1:07	13:15.8	50	27:21.8	+2:11.9
48	33	Wendy Kay Wagner	United States	14:11.1	34	1:12	13:14.1	49	27:25.1	+2:15.2
	2	Amanda Fortier	Canada	14:30.5	Did not advance					
	12	Nobuko Fukuda	Japan	14:31.6	Did not advance					
	15	Aelin Peterson	United States	14:33.7	Did not advance					
	6	Yelena Kalugina	Belarus	14:34.6	Did not advance					
	27	Cristina Paluselli	Italy	14:36.5	Did not advance					
	41	Piret Niglas	Estonia	14:36.9	Did not advance					
	43	Claudia Künzel	Germany	14:37.0	Did not advance					
	20	Olena Rodina	Ukraine	14:37.8	Did not advance					
	8	Maryna Pestryakova	Ukraine	14:41.0	Did not advance					
	38	Jaroslava Bukvajová	Slovakia	14:42.9	Did not advance					
	22	Madoka Natumi	Japan	14:51.4	Did not advance					
	3	Kikkan Randall	United States	14:53.0	Did not advance					
	17	Nataliya Sviridova-Kalinovskaya	Belarus	14:53.6	Did not advance					
	14	Kateřina Hanušová	Czech Republic	14:55.0	Did not advance					
	36	Irina Terentjeva	Lithuania	15:13.5	Did not advance					
	9	Maja Kezele	Croatia	15:40.1	Did not advance					
	1	Luan Zhengrong	China	15:40.6	Did not advance					
	18	Lee Chun-ja	South Korea	16:13.1	Did not advance					
	71	Kelime Çetinkaya	Turkey	17:10.8	Did not advance					
	72	Davaa Enkhee	Mongolia	17:20.3	Did not advance					
	7	Margarit Nikolyan	Armenia	17:23.6	Did not advance					
	13	Zsófia Gottschall	Hungary	17:36.6	Did not advance					
	73	Katerina Balkaba	Greece	18:48.9	Did not advance					
DSQ	~~57~~	Olga Danilova	Russia	~~12:58.7~~	~~1~~	~~0:00~~	~~11:54.1~~	~~9~~	~~24:52.1~~	DSQ
DSQ	~~69~~	Larisa Lazutina	Russia	~~12:58.9~~	~~2~~	~~0:00~~	~~12:01.0~~	~~16~~	~~24:59.0~~	DSQ
