= Lina Andersson =

Swedish cross-country skier

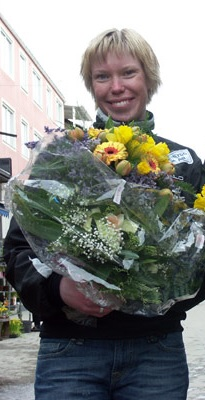
- Lina Andersson after becoming silver medalist during the 2005 FIS World Nordic Skiing Championships in Oberstdorf, Bavaria, Germany in February 2005.

Personal information
- Full name: Lina Marie Andersson
- Nationality: Sweden
- Born: March 18, 1981 (age 45) Malmberget, Sweden

Sport
- Sport: Skiing
- Club: Piteå Elit

World Cup career
- Seasons: 13 – (1999–2011)
- Indiv. starts: 113
- Indiv. podiums: 7
- Indiv. wins: 2
- Team starts: 26
- Team podiums: 6
- Team wins: 1
- Overall titles: 0 – (15th in 2002, 2005, 2006)
- Discipline titles: 0
Medal record
Women's cross-country skiing
Representing Sweden
International nordic ski competitions
Event	1st	2nd	3rd
Olympic Games	1	0	0
World Championships	0	2	1
Total	1	2	1
Olympic Games
Gold medal – first place	2006 Turin	Team sprint
World Championships
Silver medal – second place	2005 Oberstdorf	Individual sprint
Silver medal – second place	2009 Liberec	Team sprint
Bronze medal – third place	2009 Liberec	4 × 5 km relay
Junior World Championships
Gold medal – first place	1998 Pontresina	4 × 5 km relay
Gold medal – first place	1999 Saalfelden	5 km classical
Gold medal – first place	2000 Štrbské Pleso	4 × 5 km relay
Gold medal – first place	2001 Karpacz	5 km classical
Silver medal – second place	2001 Karpacz	15 km mass start
Bronze medal – third place	2001 Karpacz	4 × 5 km relay

Lina Andersson (born 18 March 1981) is a Swedish cross-country skier who was born in Malmberget and has competed since 1998. She won a gold medal in the Team sprint (with Anna Dahlberg) at the 2006 Winter Olympics in Turin and also finished 11th in the Individual sprint in those same games.

Andersson also won three medals at the FIS Nordic World Ski Championships with two silvers (Individual sprint: 2005, team sprint: 2009) and a bronze (4 × 5 km relay: 2009). She also has nineteen individual victories at all levels at various distances since 1999.

== Cross-country skiing results ==
All results are sourced from the International Ski Federation (FIS).

=== Olympic Games ===
- 1 medal – (1 gold)

Year	Age	10 km	15 km	Pursuit	30 km	Sprint	4 × 5 km relay	Team sprint
2002	20	16	—	39	—	28	12	—N/a
2006	24	33	—N/a	—	DNF	11	—	Gold

=== World Championships ===
- 3 medals – (2 silver, 1 bronze)

Year	Age	10 km	15 km	Pursuit	30 km	Sprint	4 × 5 km relay	Team sprint
2001	19	—	27	—	CNX^{[a]}	—	—	—N/a
2003	21	21	27	—	—	24	6	—N/a
2005	23	—	—N/a	—	DNS	Silver	8	—
2007	25	42	—N/a	—	—	6	4	4
2009	27	14	—N/a	—	—	—	Bronze	Silver

a. ^{1} Cancelled due to extremely cold weather.

=== World Cup ===
==== Season standings ====
Season	Age	Discipline standings					Ski Tour standings		
Season	Age	Overall	Distance	Long Distance	Middle Distance	Sprint	Nordic Opening	Tour de Ski	World Cup Final
1999	18	NC	—N/a	NC	—N/a	—	—N/a	—N/a	—N/a
2000	19	37	—N/a	61	48	21	—N/a	—N/a	—N/a
2001	20	41	—N/a	—N/a	—N/a	25	—N/a	—N/a	—N/a
2002	21	15	—N/a	—N/a	—N/a	11	—N/a	—N/a	—N/a
2003	22	53	—N/a	—N/a	—N/a	35	—N/a	—N/a	—N/a
2004	23	68	NC	—N/a	—N/a	41	—N/a	—N/a	—N/a
2005	24	15	44	—N/a	—N/a	6	—N/a	—N/a	—N/a
2006	25	15	42	—N/a	—N/a	4	—N/a	—N/a	—N/a
2007	26	20	35	—N/a	—N/a	4	—N/a	—	—N/a
2008	27	45	NC	—N/a	—N/a	29	—N/a	—	—
2009	28	48	51	—N/a	—N/a	10	—N/a	—	DNF
2010	29	42	83	—N/a	—N/a	12	—N/a	—	32
2011	30	47	77	—N/a	—N/a	21	DNF	—	DNF

==== Individual podiums ====
- 2 victories – (2 WC)
- 7 podiums – (7 WC)

No.	Season	Date	Location	Race	Level	Place
1	2000–01	7 March 2001	Oslo, Norway	1.0 km Sprint C	World Cup	3rd
2	2001–02	7 March 2001	Kuopio, Finland	10 km Individual C	World Cup	3rd
3	2004–05	5 March 2005	Lahti, Finland	1.2 km Sprint C	World Cup	1st
4	2004–05	9 March 2005	Drammen, Norway	1.0 km Sprint C	World Cup	2nd
5	2005–06	8 January 2006	Otepää, Estonia	1.0 km Sprint C	World Cup	1st
6	2005–06	22 January 2006	Oberstdorf, Germany	0.9 km Sprint C	World Cup	2nd
7	2008–09	29 November 2008	Rukatunturi, Finland	1.2 km Sprint C	World Cup	2nd

==== Team podiums ====
- 1 victory – (1 RL)
- 6 podiums – (4 RL, 2 TS)

No.	Season	Date	Location	Race	Level	Place	Teammate(s)
1	2001–02	27 November 2001	Kuopio, Finland	4 × 5 km Relay C/F	World Cup	3rd	Ek / Dahlberg / Olsson
2	2006–07	29 October 2006	Düsseldorf, Germany	6 × 0.8 km Team Sprint F	World Cup	2nd	Norgren
3	2006–07	17 December 2006	La Clusaz, France	4 × 5 km Relay C/F	World Cup	2nd	Lindborg / Kalla / Norgren
4	2006–07	4 February 2007	Davos, Switzerland	4 × 5 km Relay C/F	World Cup	1st	Strömstedt / Kalla / Norgren
5	2008–09	7 December 2008	La Clusaz, France	4 × 5 km Relay C/F	World Cup	2nd	Lindborg / Haag / Kalla
6	2008–09	18 January 2009	Whistler, Canada	6 × 1.3 km Team Sprint F	World Cup	3rdd	Olsson
