= Anna Andersson =

Swedish ice hockey player

Olympic medal record

Women's Ice hockey
Bronze medal – third place	2002 Salt Lake City	Team competition

Anna Christina Andersson (born January 28, 1982) is an ice hockey player from Sweden. She won a bronze medal at the 2002 Winter Olympics.
