= Emelie Berggren =

Swedish ice hockey player

- Born: 15 September 1982 (age 44) St. Johann in Tirol, Austria
- Height: 173 cm (5 ft 8 in)
- Weight: 73 kg (161 lb; 11 st 7 lb)
- Position: Defence
- Shot: Left
- Played for: AIK
- National team: Sweden
- Playing career: 2001–2014

Olympic medal record

Women's Ice hockey
Bronze medal – third place	2002 Salt Lake City	Team competition

Emelie Anna Berggren (born 15 September 1982) is an ice hockey player from Sweden. She won a bronze medal at the 2002 Winter Olympics. As team captain she led one of Sweden's best ice hockey teams to many gold medals in both the Swedish and European league.
