= Ulrica Lindström =

Swedish ice hockey player

- Born: 30 March 1979 (age 47) Örnsköldsvik, Sweden
- Height: 173 cm (5 ft 8 in)
- Weight: 64 kg (141 lb; 10 st 1 lb)
- Position: Forward
- Shot: Left
- Played for: Brynäs IF
- National team: Sweden
- Playing career: 1998–2008

Olympic medal record

Women's Ice hockey
Bronze medal – third place	2002 Salt Lake City	Team competition

Annelie Ulrica Lindström (born March 30, 1979) is an ice hockey player from Sweden. She won a bronze medal at the 2002 Winter Olympics.
