= Josefin Pettersson =

Swedish ice hockey player

Olympic medal record

Women's Ice hockey
Bronze medal – third place	2002 Salt Lake City	Team competition

Josefin Kristin Pettersson (born January 13, 1984) is an ice hockey player from Sweden. Pettersson won a bronze medal at the 2002 Winter Olympics.
