= Viola Bauer =

German cross-country skier (born 1976)

Personal information
- Nationality: Germany
- Born: 13 December 1976 (age 49) Annaberg-Buchholz, East Germany

Sport
- Sport: Skiing
- Club: SWV Goldlauter

World Cup career
- Seasons: 9 – (1999–2007)
- Indiv. starts: 119
- Indiv. podiums: 1
- Indiv. wins: 0
- Team starts: 29
- Team podiums: 11
- Team wins: 5
- Overall titles: 0 – (16th in 2007)
- Discipline titles: 0
Medal record
Women's cross-country skiing
Representing Germany
Gold medal – first place	2002 Salt Lake City	4 × 5 km relay
Silver medal – second place	2006 Turin	4 × 5 km relay
Bronze medal – third place	2002 Salt Lake City	5 km + 5 km combined pursuit
World Championships
Gold medal – first place	2003 Val di Fiemme	4 × 5 km relay
Silver medal – second place	2007 Sapporo	4 × 5 km relay
Bronze medal – third place	1999 Ramsau	4 × 5 km relay

Viola Bauer (born 13 December 1976) is a retired German cross-country skier who competed from 1995 to 2007. She has won a complete set of medals at the Winter Olympics with a gold (2002) and a silver (2006) in the 4 × 5 km relay, and a bronze in the 5 km + 5 km combined pursuit (2002).

Bauer also has a complete set of 4 × 5 km relay medals at the FIS Nordic World Ski Championships with a gold in 2003, a silver in 2007, and a bronze in 1999. Her best individual finish at the World Championships was sixth in the Individual sprint event in 2005.

Bauer had eleven individual wins at various levels from 1998 to 2007. She retired following the 2006-07 World Cup season. She now works as a commentator for Eurosport.

== Cross-country skiing results ==
All results are sourced from the International Ski Federation (FIS).

=== Olympic Games ===
- 3 medals – (1 gold, 1 silver, 1 bronze)

Year	Age	10 km	15 km	Pursuit	30 km	Sprint	4 × 5 km relay	Team sprint
2002	25	10	—	Bronze	6	—	Gold	—N/a
2006	29	10	—N/a	—	—	—	Silver	5

=== World Championships ===
- 3 medals – (1 gold, 1 silver, 1 bronze)

Year	Age	5 km	10 km	15 km	Pursuit	30 km	Sprint	4 × 5 km relay	Team sprint
1999	22	29	—N/a	—	24	—	—N/a	Bronze	—N/a
2001	24	—N/a	13	13	18	CNX^{[a]}	—	4	—N/a
2003	26	—N/a	—	DNS	18	—	—	Gold	—N/a
2005	28	—N/a	—	—N/a	13	11	6	4	4
2007	30	—N/a	—	—N/a	21	23	16	Silver	—

a. ^{1} Cancelled due to extremely cold weather.

=== World Cup ===
==== Season standings ====
Season	Age	Discipline standings					Ski Tour standings
Season	Age	Overall	Distance	Long Distance	Middle Distance	Sprint	Tour de Ski
1999	22	66	—N/a	NC	—N/a	45	—N/a
2000	23	55	—N/a	—	NC	36	—N/a
2001	24	35	—N/a	—N/a	—N/a	38	—N/a
2002	25	21	—N/a	—N/a	—N/a	15	—N/a
2003	26	20	—N/a	—N/a	—N/a	34	—N/a
2004	27	43	36	—N/a	—N/a	37	—N/a
2005	28	32	28	—N/a	—N/a	29	—N/a
2006	29	18	14	—N/a	—N/a	25	—N/a
2007	30	16	18	—N/a	—N/a	26	10

==== Individual podiums ====
- 1 podium

No.	Season	Date	Location	Race	Level	Place
1	2006–07	11 March 2007	Lahti, Finland	10 km Individual C	World Cup	3rd

==== Team podiums ====
- 5 victories – (4 RL, 1 TS)
- 11 podiums – (9 RL, 2 TS)

No.	Season	Date	Location	Race	Level	Place	Teammate(s)
1	2001–02	10 March 2002	Falun, Sweden	4 × 5 km Relay C/F	World Cup	3rd	Henkel / Künzel / Sachenbacher
2	2002–03	24 November 2002	Kiruna, Sweden	4 × 5 km Relay C/F	World Cup	2nd	Henkel / Künzel / Sachenbacher
3	2002–03	8 December 2002	Davos, Switzerland	4 × 5 km Relay C/F	World Cup	3rd	Henkel / Sachenbacher / Künzel
4	2002–03	19 January 2003	Nové Město, Czech Republic	4 × 5 km Relay C/F	World Cup	1st	Henkel / Künzel / Sachenbacher
5	2002–03	26 January 2003	Oberhof, Germany	6 × 1.5 km Team Sprint F	World Cup	3rd	Böhler
6	2002–03	23 March 2003	Falun, Sweden	4 × 5 km Relay C/F	World Cup	1st	Henkel / Künzel / Sachenbacher
7	2003–04	11 January 2004	Otepää, Estonia	4 × 5 km Relay C/F	World Cup	2nd	Henkel / Sachenbacher / Künzel
8	2003–04	7 February 2004	La Clusaz, France	4 × 5 km Relay C/F	World Cup	2nd	Henkel / Reschwam Schulze / Künzel
9	2004–05	23 January 2005	Pragelato, Italy	6 × 1.2 km Team Sprint C	World Cup	1st	Künzel
10	2006–07	17 December 2006	La Clusaz, France	4 × 5 km Relay C/F	World Cup	1st	Böhler / Künzel-Nystad / Sachenbacher-Stehle
11	2006–07	25 March 2007	Falun, Sweden	4 × 5 km Relay C/F	World Cup	1st	Böhler / Künzel-Nystad / Sachenbacher-Stehle
