= Lotta Almblad =

Swedish ice hockey player

Olympic medal record

Women's Ice hockey
| Bronze medal – third place | 2002 Salt Lake City | Team competition |

Åsa Annelie Charlotte Almblad-Lindefors (born April 28, 1972) is an ice hockey player from Sweden. She won a bronze medal at the 2002 Winter Olympics.
