= Kristina Bergstrand =

Swedish ice hockey player

- Born: 4 October 1963 (age 63) Stockholm, Sweden
- Height: 163 cm (5 ft 4 in)
- Weight: 64 kg (141 lb; 10 st 1 lb)
- Position: Forward
- Shot: Left
- Played for: MB Hockey
- National team: Sweden
- Playing career: 1988–2004

Olympic medal record

Women's Ice hockey
Bronze medal – third place	2002 Salt Lake City	Team competition

Margit Anna Kristina Bergstrand (born 4 October 1963) is an ice hockey player from Sweden. She won a bronze medal at the 2002 Winter Olympics.
