= Annica Åhlén =

Swedish ice hockey player

- Born: 17 January 1975 (age 51) Trångsund, Sweden
- Height: 177 cm (5 ft 10 in)
- Weight: 75 kg (165 lb; 11 st 11 lb)
- Position: Goaltender
- Caught: Left
- National team: Sweden
- Playing career: 1990–2002
Medal record
Women's ice hockey
Representing Sweden
Olympic Games
Bronze medal – third place	2002 Salt Lake City	Tournament

Annica Gunilla Åhlén (born 17 January 1975 in Trångsund, Sweden) is a retired Swedish ice hockey goaltender. Åhlén first represented Team Sweden internationally at the 1990 IIHF Women's World Championship. In total, she has played in 16 world championships games, with a record of 7 wins, 8 losses and 1 tie. Åhlén played for Sweden at the 1998 and 2002 Winter Olympics, capturing a bronze medal in 2002.

== Career statistics ==
Year	Team	Event	Result	GP	W	L	T/OT	MIN	GA	SO	GAA	SV%
1994	Sweden	WC	5th	5	-	-	-	300:00	17	-	3.40	0.892
1998	Sweden	OG	5th	3	0	3	0	179:10	16	0	5.36	0.837
2002	Sweden	OG	3rd place, bronze medalist(s)	2	1	1	0	120:00	13	0	6.50	0.845
