= Maria Larsson (ice hockey) =

Swedish ice hockey player

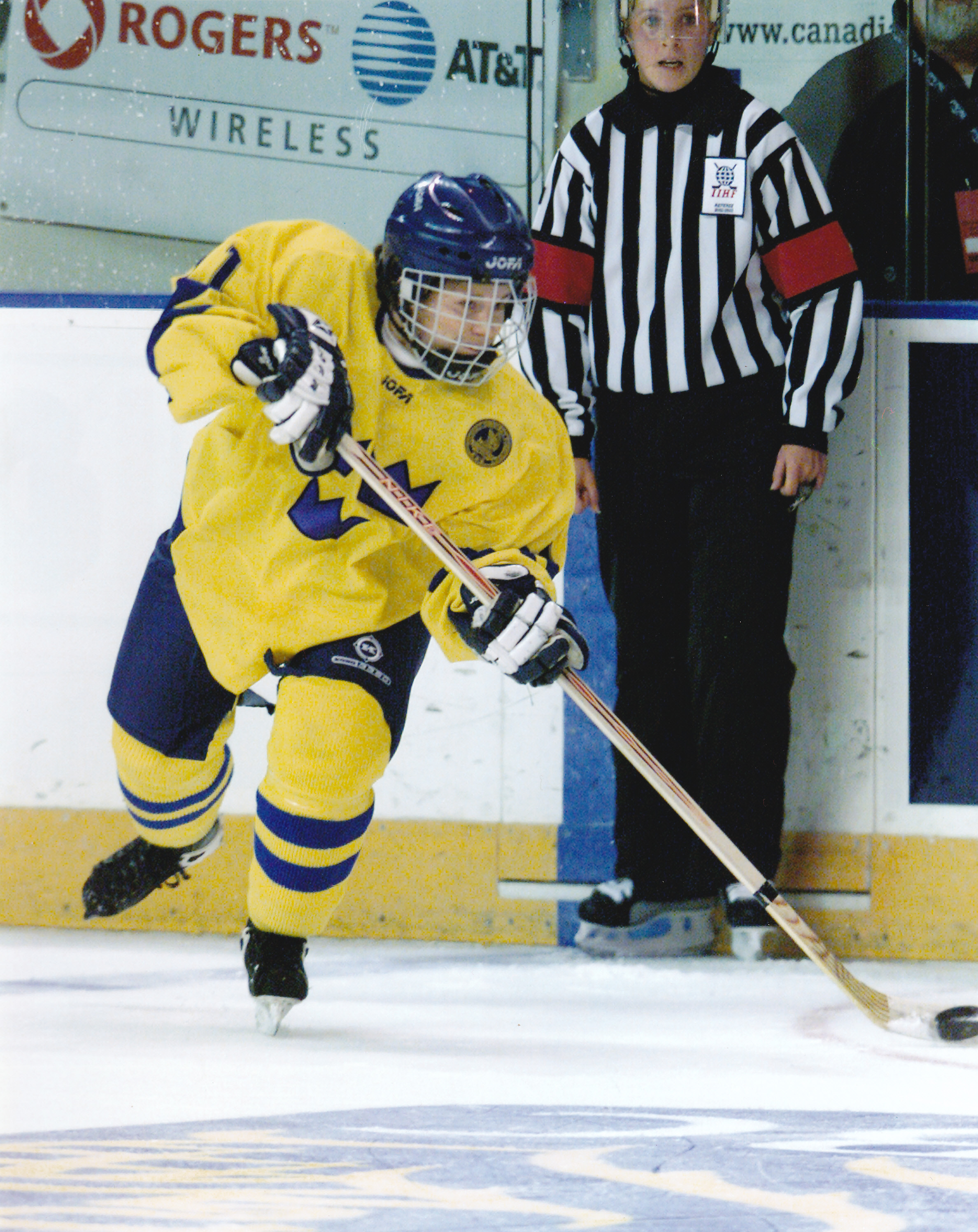
- Born: 18 February 1979 (age 47) Haninge, Sweden
- Height: 154 cm (5 ft 1 in)
- Weight: 51 kg (112 lb; 8 st 0 lb)
- Position: Forward
- Shot: Left
- Played for: Haninge Anchors HC
- National team: Sweden
- Playing career: 1998–2017

Olympic medal record

Women's Ice hockey
Bronze medal – third place	2002 Salt Lake City	Team competition

Maria Linda Larsson (born 18 February 1979) is an ice hockey player from Sweden. She won a bronze medal at the 2002 Winter Olympics.
