= Nordic combined at the 2002 Winter Olympics – Individual =

Men's individual at the XIX Olympic Winter Games
- Pictogram for Nordic combined
- Venue: Utah Olympic Park (ski jumping) & Soldier Hollow (cross-country)
- Dates: 9–10 February 2002
- Competitors: 45 from 14 nations
- Winning time: 39:11.7

Medalists
1st place, gold medalist(s)		Samppa Lajunen	Finland
2nd place, silver medalist(s)		Jaakko Tallus	Finland
3rd place, bronze medalist(s)		Felix Gottwald	Austria

The men's individual Nordic combined competition for the 2002 Winter Olympics in Salt Lake City at Utah Olympic Park and Soldier Hollow on 9 and 10 February.

== Results ==
=== Ski Jumping ===
Athletes did two normal hill ski jumps. The combined points earned on the jumps determined the starting order and times for the cross-country race; each point was equal to a 4-second deficit.

Rank	Name	Country	Jump 1	Jump 2	Total	Time Difference
1	Jaakko Tallus	Finland	139.5	128.0	267.5	+0:00
2	Mario Stecher	Austria	130.0	128.0	258.0	+0:48
3	Samppa Lajunen	Finland	131.5	125.5	257.0	+0:53
4	Christoph Bieler	Austria	129.5	125.5	255.0	+1:03
5	Ronny Ackermann	Germany	125.5	128.5	254.0	+1:08
6	Daito Takahashi	Japan	118.0	125.5	243.5	+2:00
7	Todd Lodwick	United States	118.0	122.5	240.5	+2:15
8	Bill Demong	United States	118.0	121.5	239.5	+2:20
9	Andy Hartmann	Switzerland	120.5	116.0	236.5	+2:35
10	Kevin Arnould	France	117.5	119.0	236.5	+2:35
11	Felix Gottwald	Austria	116.0	119.0	235.0	+2:43
12	Gen Tomii	Japan	110.0	124.5	234.5	+2:45
13	Kenji Ogiwara	Japan	117.0	116.0	233.0	+2:53
14	Michal Pšenko	Slovakia	117.0	115.0	232.0	+2:58
15	Björn Kircheisen	Germany	115.5	116.5	232.0	+2:58
16	Pavel Churavý	Czech Republic	114.0	114.5	228.5	+3:15
17	Aleksey Barannikov	Russia	115.0	112.0	227.0	+3:23
18	Christoph Eugen	Austria	111.5	113.0	224.5	+3:35
19	Andrej Jezeršek	Slovenia	111.5	112.0	223.5	+3:40
20	Petr Šmejc	Czech Republic	113.5	110.0	223.5	+3:40
21	Ronny Heer	Switzerland	105.0	117.0	222.0	+3:48
22	Satoshi Mori	Japan	109.5	112.0	221.5	+3:50
23	Kristian Hammer	Norway	117.5	104.0	221.5	+3:50
24	Hannu Manninen	Finland	112.0	109.5	221.5	+3:50
25	Jens Salumäe	Estonia	111.0	109.5	220.5	+3:55
26	Johnny Spillane	United States	102.5	115.5	218.0	+4:08
27	Nicolas Bal	France	103.0	113.5	216.5	+4:15
28	Aleksey Fadeyev	Russia	115.0	99.5	214.5	+4:25
29	Tambet Pikkor	Estonia	110.0	103.0	213.0	+4:33
30	Preben Fjære Brynemo	Norway	103.5	108.5	212.0	+4:38
31	Aleksey Tsvetkov	Russia	104.0	106.0	210.0	+4:48
32	Matt Dayton	United States	104.0	105.5	209.5	+4:50
33	Georg Hettich	Germany	105.5	104.0	209.5	+4:50
34	Mikko Keskinarkaus	Finland	108.0	101.0	209.0	+4:53
35	Jan Rune Grave	Norway	107.0	100.0	207.0	+5:03
36	Frédéric Baud	France	108.5	97.5	206.0	+5:08
37	Ludovic Roux	France	95.0	107.0	202.0	+5:28
38	Sebastian Haseney	Germany	100.0	99.0	199.0	+5:43
39	Andreas Hurschler	Switzerland	86.5	111.5	198.0	+5:48
40	Vladimir Lysenin	Russia	99.5	95.5	195.0	+6:03
41	Sverre Rotevatn	Norway	91.5	98.0	189.5	+6:30
42	Ladislav Rygl	Czech Republic	95.0	94.5	189.5	+6:30
43	Ivan Rieder	Switzerland	85.0	101.5	186.5	+6:45
44	Milan Kučera	Czech Republic	109.0	73.0	182.0	+7:08
45	Sergey Zakharenko	Belarus	94.0	77.5	171.5	+8:00

=== Cross-Country ===
The cross-country race was over a distance of 15 kilometres.

Rank	Name	Country	Start time	Cross country time	Cross country rank	Finish time
1st place, gold medalist(s)	Samppa Lajunen	Finland	+0:53	38:18.7	6	39:11.7
2nd place, silver medalist(s)	Jaakko Tallus	Finland	+0:00	39:36.4	21	39:36.4
3rd place, bronze medalist(s)	Felix Gottwald	Austria	+2:43	37:23.5	1	40:06.5
4	Ronny Ackermann	Germany	+1:08	39:19.8	19	40:27.8
5	Björn Kircheisen	Germany	+2:58	37:57.9	5	40:55.9
6	Mario Stecher	Austria	+0:48	40:42.8	31	41:30.8
7	Todd Lodwick	United States	+2:15	39:24.4	20	41:39.4
8	Kristian Hammer	Norway	+3:50	37:50.8	3	41:40.8
9	Andy Hartmann	Switzerland	+2:35	39:07.3	15	41:42.3
10	Nicolas Bal	France	+4:15	37:28.3	2	41:43.3
11	Kenji Ogiwara	Japan	+2:53	38:52.6	12	41:45.6
12	Daito Takahashi	Japan	+2:00	40:01.2	26	42:01.2
13	Andrej Jezeršek	Slovenia	+3:40	38:22.9	8	42:02.9
14	Hannu Manninen	Finland	+3:50	38:31.1	9	42:21.1
15	Christoph Bieler	Austria	+1:03	41:18.1	37	42:21.1
16	Pavel Churavý	Czech Republic	+3:15	39:56.3	25	43:11.3
17	Kevin Arnould	France	+2:35	40:37.1	30	43:12.1
18	Georg Hettich	Germany	+4:50	38:22.3	7	43:12.3
19	Bill Demong	United States	+2:20	40:58.1	36	43:18.1
20	Christoph Eugen	Austria	+3:35	39:51.1	24	43:26.1
21	Sebastian Haseney	Germany	+5:43	37:54.0	4	43:37.0
22	Aleksey Tsvetkov	Russia	+4:48	38:50.2	11	43:38.2
23	Preben Fjære Brynemo	Norway	+4:38	39:12.3	16	43:50.3
24	Aleksey Barannikov	Russia	+3:23	40:44.3	32	44:07.3
25	Jan Rune Grave	Norway	+5:03	39:15.5	17	44:18.5
26	Andreas Hurschler	Switzerland	+5:48	38:31.4	10	44:19.4
27	Ludovic Roux	France	+5:28	38:54.3	13	44:22.3
28	Mikko Keskinarkaus	Finland	+4:53	39:45.9	23	44:38.9
29	Ronny Heer	Switzerland	+3:48	40:52.0	34	44:40.0
30	Satoshi Mori	Japan	+3:50	40:50.6	33	44:40.6
31	Aleksey Fadeyev	Russia	+4:25	40:24.0	27	44:49.0
32	Johnny Spillane	United States	+4:08	40:57.5	35	45:05.5
33	Gen Tomii	Japan	+2:45	42:30.4	41	45:15.4
34	Matt Dayton	United States	+4:50	40:27.8	28	45:17.8
35	Vladimir Lysenin	Russia	+6:03	39:18.5	18	45:21.5
36	Ladislav Rygl	Czech Republic	+6:30	38:54.6	14	45:24.6
37	Frédéric Baud	France	+5:08	40:27.9	29	45:35.9
38	Michal Pšenko	Slovakia	+2:58	43:08.2	42	46:06.2
39	Sverre Rotevatn	Norway	+6:30	39:36.5	22	46:06.5
40	Jens Salumäe	Estonia	+3:55	44:32.4	43	48:27.4
41	Milan Kučera	Czech Republic	+7:08	41:24.4	39	48:32.4
42	Ivan Rieder	Switzerland	+6:45	42:27.0	40	49:12.0
43	Petr Šmejc	Czech Republic	+3:40	45:33.7	44	49:13.7
44	Sergey Zakharenko	Belarus	+8:00	41:18.9	38	49:18.9
-	Tambet Pikkor	Estonia	+4:33	DNS	-	-
