= Nordic combined at the 2002 Winter Olympics – Sprint =

Men's sprint at the XIX Olympic Winter Games
- Pictogram for Nordic combined
- Venue: Utah Olympic Park (ski jumping) & Soldier Hollow (cross-country)
- Dates: 21–22 February 2002
- Competitors: 46 from 14 nations
- Winning time: 16:40.1

Medalists
1st place, gold medalist(s)		Samppa Lajunen	Finland
2nd place, silver medalist(s)		Ronny Ackermann	Germany
3rd place, bronze medalist(s)		Felix Gottwald	Austria

The men's individual sprint Nordic combined competition for the 2002 Winter Olympics in Salt Lake City at Utah Olympic Park and Soldier Hollow on 21 and 22 February.

== Results ==
=== Ski Jumping ===
Athletes did one large hill ski jump. Points earned on the jump determined the starting order and times for the cross-country race; each point was equal to a 4-second deficit.

Rank	Name	Country	Points	Time Difference
1	Samppa Lajunen	Finland	123.8	+0:00
2	Ronny Ackermann	Germany	119.9	+0:15
3	Jaakko Tallus	Finland	119.0	+0:18
4	Daito Takahashi	Japan	114.4	+0:35
5	Mario Stecher	Austria	113.5	+0:39
6	Christoph Bieler	Austria	112.7	+0:42
7	Jens Salumäe	Estonia	111.8	+0:45
8	Marcel Höhlig	Germany	111.6	+0:46
9	Michael Gruber	Austria	110.5	+0:50
10	Petr Šmejc	Czech Republic	110.4	+0:50
11	Felix Gottwald	Austria	110.3	+0:51
12	Todd Lodwick	United States	109.0	+0:56
13	Bill Demong	United States	108.2	+0:59
14	Satoshi Mori	Japan	106.9	+1:03
15	Björn Kircheisen	Germany	105.8	+1:08
16	Seppi Hurschler	Switzerland	105.8	+1:08
17	Hannu Manninen	Finland	104.7	+1:12
18	Andy Hartmann	Switzerland	104.2	+1:14
19	Ronny Heer	Switzerland	103.9	+1:15
20	Ludovic Roux	France	103.5	+1:16
21	Pavel Churavý	Czech Republic	102.5	+1:20
22	Jens Gaiser	Germany	102.4	+1:20
23	Mikko Keskinarkaus	Finland	101.7	+1:23
24	Norihito Kobayashi	Japan	101.1	+1:25
25	Kevin Arnould	France	101.1	+1:25
26	Milan Kučera	Czech Republic	100.2	+1:29
27	Andrej Jezeršek	Slovenia	100.1	+1:29
28	Sverre Rotevatn	Norway	100.0	+1:29
29	Kristian Hammer	Norway	98.3	+1:36
30	Preben Fjære Brynemo	Norway	96.8	+1:41
31	Tambet Pikkor	Estonia	96.7	+1:42
32	Nicolas Bal	France	96.5	+1:42
33	Jan Rune Grave	Norway	94.3	+1:51
34	Kenji Ogiwara	Japan	93.5	+1:54
35	Frédéric Baud	France	93.1	+1:55
36	Michal Pšenko	Slovakia	92.4	+1:58
37	Johnny Spillane	United States	91.3	+2:02
38	Andreas Hurschler	Switzerland	91.2	+2:02
39	Matt Dayton	United States	87.1	+2:18
40	Sergey Zakharenko	Belarus	86.6	+2:20

=== Cross-Country ===
The cross-country race was over a distance of 7.5 kilometres.

Rank	Name	Country	Start time	Cross country time	Cross country rank	Finish time
1st place, gold medalist(s)	Samppa Lajunen	Finland	+0:00	16:40.1	16	16:40.1
2nd place, silver medalist(s)	Ronny Ackermann	Germany	+0:15	16:34.1	9	16:49.1
3rd place, bronze medalist(s)	Felix Gottwald	Austria	+0:51	16:29.3	5	17:20.3
4	Jaakko Tallus	Finland	+0:18	17:07.9	25	17:25.9
5	Todd Lodwick	United States	+0:56	16:36.1	11	17:32.1
6	Daito Takahashi	Japan	+0:35	17:02.9	24	17:37.9
7	Hannu Manninen	Finland	+1:12	16:30.7	7	17:42.7
8	Andy Hartmann	Switzerland	+1:14	16:30.7	7	17:44.7
9	Björn Kircheisen	Germany	+1:08	16:37.2	12	17:45.2
10	Ludovic Roux	France	+1:16	16:29.7	6	17:45.7
11	Mario Stecher	Austria	+0:39	17:10.5	28	17:49.5
12	Andrej Jezeršek	Slovenia	+1:29	16:23.8	3	17:52.8
13	Sverre Rotevatn	Norway	+1:29	16:25.4	4	17:54.4
14	Bill Demong	United States	+0:59	16:57.1	21	17:56.1
15	Pavel Churavý	Czech Republic	+1:20	16:38.0	13	17:58.0
16	Christoph Bieler	Austria	+0:42	17:19.6	30	18:01.6
17	Norihito Kobayashi	Japan	+1:25	16:39.6	15	18:04.6
18	Nicolas Bal	France	+1:42	16:22.8	2	18:04.8
19	Jens Gaiser	Germany	+1:20	16:59.3	23	18:19.3
20	Kristian Hammer	Norway	+1:36	16:45.0	18	18:21.0
21	Andreas Hurschler	Switzerland	+2:02	16:19.9	1	18:21.9
22	Satoshi Mori	Japan	+1:03	17:22.0	31	18:25.0
23	Mikko Keskinarkaus	Finland	+1:23	17:08.4	26	18:31.4
24	Petr Šmejc	Czech Republic	+0:50	17:41.9	34	18:31.9
25	Marcel Höhlig	Germany	+0:46	17:46.2	37	18:32.2
26	Jan Rune Grave	Norway	+1:51	16:42.2	17	18:33.2
27	Frédéric Baud	France	+1:55	16:38.5	14	18:33.5
28	Ronny Heer	Switzerland	+1:15	17:19.0	29	18:34.0
29	Michael Gruber	Austria	+0:50	17:44.0	35	18:34.0
30	Preben Fjære Brynemo	Norway	+1:41	16:54.5	20	18:35.5
31	Seppi Hurschler	Switzerland	+1:08	17:28.0	32	18:36.0
32	Johnny Spillane	United States	+2:02	16:34.4	10	18:36.4
33	Kenji Ogiwara	Japan	+1:54	16:45.1	19	18:39.1
34	Kevin Arnould	France	+1:25	17:35.9	33	19:00.9
35	Milan Kučera	Czech Republic	+1:29	17:44.5	36	19:13.5
36	Matt Dayton	United States	+2:18	16:57.9	22	19:15.9
37	Jens Salumäe	Estonia	+0:45	18:44.2	39	19:29.2
38	Sergey Zakharenko	Belarus	+2:20	17:09.5	27	19:29.5
39	Michal Pšenko	Slovakia	+1:58	18:09.3	38	20:07.3
40	Tambet Pikkor	Estonia	+1:42	18:56.1	40	20:38.1
