= Nordic combined at the 2002 Winter Olympics – Team =

Team at the XIX Olympic Winter Games
- Venue: Park City (ski jumping); Soldier Hollow (cross-country skiing)
- Dates: February 16–17, 2002
- Competitors: 40 from 10 nations
- Winning time: 48:42.2

Medalists
1st place, gold medalist(s)		Jari Mantila; Hannu Manninen; Jaakko Tallus; Samppa Lajunen	Finland
2nd place, silver medalist(s)		Björn Kircheisen; Georg Hettich; Marcel Höhlig; Ronny Ackermann	Germany
3rd place, bronze medalist(s)		Christoph Bieler; Michael Gruber; Mario Stecher; Felix Gottwald	Austria

The Men's team Nordic combined competition for the 2002 Winter Olympics was held in Park City & Soldier Hollow, United States. The ski jumping part took place on February 16, and the cross-country race on February 17.

== Results ==
=== Ski Jumping ===
Each of the four team members, performed two jumps, which were judged in the same fashion as the Olympic ski jumping competition. The scores for all the jumps each team took were summed, and used to calculate their deficit in the cross-country race. Each one point behind the leading score of Finland was equivalent to about one and a half seconds of time deficit.

Rank	Athlete	Run 1	Rank	Run 2	Rank	Total	Deficit
1	Finland; Jari Mantila; Jaakko Tallus; Hannu Manninen; Samppa Lajunen	486.5; 112.0; 127.0; 119.5; 128.0	1	481.0; 113.0; 125.0; 113.5; 129.5	1	967.5	0:00
2	Austria; Michael Gruber; Christoph Bieler; Mario Stecher; Felix Gottwald	467.5; 110.5; 116.0; 119.0; 122.0	2	471.0; 104.5; 123.0; 125.0; 118.5	2	938.5	0:44
3	United States; Todd Lodwick; Matt Dayton; Johnny Spillane; Bill Demong	448.5; 119.5; 97.5; 108.5; 123.0	5	456.5; 120.0; 103.5; 107.0; 126.0	3	905.0	1:34
4	Japan; Gen Tomii; Kenji Ogiwara; Satoshi Mori; Daito Takahashi	450.5; 112.5; 106.5; 109.5; 122.0	3	450.5; 115.5; 108.0; 104.5; 122.5	4	901.0	1:40
5	Germany; Björn Kircheisen; Georg Hettich; Marcel Höhlig; Ronny Ackermann	449.5; 109.5; 104.5; 113.0; 122.5	4	444.0; 110.5; 103.0; 111.0; 119.5	5	893.5	1:51
6	Czech Republic; Petr Šmejc; Milan Kučera; Lukáš Heřmanský; Pavel Churavý	448.0; 110.5; 109.5; 112.0; 116.0	6	444.0; 118.0; 105.0; 103.0; 118.0	5	892.0	1:53
7	Switzerland; Andreas Hurschler; Jan Schmid; Ivan Rieder; Ronny Heer	437.5; 106.0; 102.0; 112.0; 117.5	7	425.5; 99.0; 111.0; 101.0; 114.5	8	863.0	2:37
8	France; Ludovic Roux; Frédéric Baud; Nicolas Bal; Kevin Arnould	412.5; 103.0; 102.0; 104.5; 103.0	8	434.0; 115.0; 101.5; 103.5; 114.0	7	846.5	3:02
9	Russia; Alexei Fadeev; Alexei Zvetkov; Vladimir Lysenin; Alexei Barannikov	398.0; 110.5; 91.5; 83.0; 113.0	9	423.0; 113.5; 102.5; 94.5; 112.5	9	821.0	3:40
10	Norway; Jan Rune Grave; Lars Andreas Østvik; Sverre Rotevatn; Kristian Hammer	386.0; 106.0; 87.5; 89.0; 103.5	10	405.5; 108.5; 98.0; 93.5; 105.5	10	791.5	4:24

=== Cross-Country ===
Rank	Athlete	Deficit	Time	Rank	Total
Gold medal	Finland; Jari Mantila; Hannu Manninen; Jaakko Tallus; Samppa Lajunen	+0:00	48:42.2; 12:49.9; 11:28.1; 12:14.1; 12:10.1	6	48:42.2
Silver medal	Germany; Björn Kircheisen; Georg Hettich; Marcel Höhlig; Ronny Ackermann	+1:51	46:58.7; 11:48.0; 11:49.0; 11:46.3; 11:35.4	2	+0:07.5
Bronze medal	Austria; Christoph Bieler; Michael Gruber; Mario Stecher; Felix Gottwald	+0:44	48:09.2; 12:26.9; 11:57.6; 12:11.4; 11:33.3	3	+0:11.0
4	United States; Todd Lodwick; Bill Demong; Johnny Spillane; Matt Dayton	+1:34	48:20.1; 12:07.7; 11:58.3; 12:23.7; 11:50.4	4	+1:11.9
5	Norway; Sverre Rotevatn; Lars Andreas Østvik; Jan Rune Grave; Kristian Hammer	+4:24	46:58.1; 11:57.4; 11:27.0; 11:48.6; 11:45.1	1	+2:39.9
6	France; Frédéric Baud; Ludovic Roux; Kevin Arnould; Nicolas Bal	+3:02	48:33.5; 11:59.9; 12:11.6; 12:36.1; 11:45.9	5	+2:53.3
7	Switzerland; Andreas Hurschler; Ronny Heer; Jan Schmid; Ivan Rieder	+2:37	49:30.9; 11:54.2; 12:07.5; 12:44.7; 12:44.5	7	+3:25.7
8	Japan; Kenji Ogiwara; Gen Tomii; Satoshi Mori; Daito Takahashi	+1:40	50:46.5; 12:33.2; 12:52.5; 12:35.2; 12:45.6	8	+3:44.3
9	Czech Republic; Milan Kučera; Lukáš Heřmanský; Pavel Churavý; Petr Šmejc	+1:53	51:35.8; 12:49.1; 13:52.3; 11:51.4; 13:03.0	9	+4:46.6
	Russia; Alexei Fadeev; Alexei Zvetkov; Vladimir Lysenin; Alexei Barannikov	+3:40	DNS	—	—
