= FIS Nordic Combined Continental Cup =

- Genre: Nordic combined
- Inaugurated: 15 December 1990; 35 years ago (Men); 6 January 2018; 8 years ago (Women)
- Organiser: International Ski Federation
- 2024–25 FIS Nordic Combined Continental Cup

The FIS Nordic Combined Continental Cup is a Nordic combined competition organized yearly by International Ski Federation, being the second level in international competition for this sport. It was first arranged for the 1990–91 season under the name "World Cup B". It helds its current name since the 2008–09 season. Women's inaugural competition was the 2017–18 season.

== Standings ==
The table below shows the three highest ranked skiers for each Continental Cup season.

=== Men ===
==== Overall ====
Season	Winner	Runner-up	Third
1990–91	(Czechoslovakia) Josef Kovařík	(West Germany) Thomas Donaubauer	(Switzerland) Andreas Schaad
1991–92	(Germany) Thomas Krause	(Germany) Uwe Prenzel	(Czechoslovakia) Radek Skopek
1992–93	(Germany) Thomas Abratis	(Germany) Enrico Heisig	(Germany) Falk Weber
1993–94	(Norway) Glenn Skram	(Japan) Tsugiharu Ogiwara	(Austria) Günther Csar
1994–95	(Switzerland) Markus Wüst	(Czech Republic) Zbyněk Pánek	(Germany) Sepp Buchner
1995–96	(Norway) Gard Myhre	(Switzerland) Stefan Wittwer	(Austria) Christoph Bieler
1996–97	(France) Frédéric Baud	(Austria) Robert Stadelmann	(Germany) Falk Weber
1997–98	(Norway) Lars Andreas Østvik	(Japan) Gen Tomii	(Norway) Preben Fjære Brynemo
1998–99	(Austria) Christoph Bieler	(Norway) Preben Fjære Brynemo	(Japan) Kouji Takasawa
1999–00	(France) Frédéric Baud	(Norway) Sverre Rotevatn	(Finland) Antti Kuisma
2000–01	(Norway) Jan Rune Grave	(United States) Kris Erichsen	(Slovenia) Andrej Jezeršek
2001–02	(Norway) Sverre Rotevatn	(United States) Carl Van Loan	(Estonia) Jens Salumäe
2002–03	(Norway) Magnus Moan	(Germany) Matthias Mehringer	(Germany) Marc Frey
2003–04	(Japan) Yosuke Hatakeyama	(Switzerland) Ivan Rieder	(Japan) Takashi Kitamura
2004–05	(Germany) Stephan Münchmeyer	(Germany) Marcel Höhlig	(Austria) Bernhard Gruber
2005–06	(Germany) Florian Schillinger	(Germany) Stephan Münchmeyer	(France) Maxime Laheurte
2006–07	(Norway) Einar Uvsløkk	(Germany) Steffen Tepel	(Norway) Mikko Kokslien
2007–08	(Austria) Marco Pichlmayer	(Germany) Mark Schlott	(Norway) Magnus Krog
2008–09	(Germany) Matthias Menz	(Germany) Ruben Welde	(Germany) Andreas Günter
2009–10	(Austria) Tomaz Druml	(Austria) Benjamin Kreiner	(Germany) Christian Beetz
2010–11	(Germany) Fabian Rießle	(Norway) Magnus Krog	(Norway) Jørgen Graabak
2011–12	(Slovenia) Marjan Jelenko	(France) Geoffrey Lafarge	(Germany) Mark Schlott
2012–13	(Germany) Andreas Günter	(Austria) Harald Lemmerer	(Norway) Truls Sønstehagen Johansen
2013–14	(Austria) Tomaz Druml	(Germany) Wolfgang Bösl	(Austria) Lukas Greiderer
2014–15	(Austria) Lukas Greiderer	(Austria) Harald Lemmerer	(Norway) Gudmund Storlien
2015–16	(Austria) Martin Fritz	(Austria) Harald Lemmerer	(Austria) Lukas Greiderer
2016–17	(Austria) Martin Fritz	(Germany) David Welde	(Germany) Tobias Simon
2017–18	(Austria) Thomas Jöbstl	(Austria) Martin Fritz	(Norway) Sindre Ure Søtvik
2018–19	(Austria) Paul Gerstgraser	(Norway) Leif Torbjørn Næsvold	(Austria) Thomas Jöbstl
2019–20	(Germany) Jakob Lange	(Austria) Paul Gerstgraser	(Norway) Lars Ivar Skårset
2020–21	(Norway) Simen Tiller	(Norway) Lars Ivar Skårset	(Germany) David Mach
2021–22	(Germany) Jakob Lange	(Germany) David Mach	(Germany) Wendelin Thannheimer
2022–23	(Germany) Terence Weber	(Germany) Wendelin Thannheimer	(Austria) Manuel Einkemmer
2023–24	(Norway) Aleksander Skoglund	(Austria) Florian Kolb	(Germany) Jakob Lange

=== Women ===
==== Overall ====
Season	Winner	Runner-up	Third
2017–18	(Russia) Stefaniya Nadymova	(Japan) Ayane Miyazaki	(Germany) Jenny Nowak
2018–19	(United States) Tara Geraghty-Moats	(Norway) Gyda Westvold Hansen	(Germany) Jenny Nowak
2019–20	(United States) Tara Geraghty-Moats	(Norway) Marte Leinan Lund	(Norway) Gyda Westvold Hansen
2020–21	(Austria) Sigrun Kleinrath	(United States) Tara Geraghty-Moats	(Norway) Gyda Westvold Hansen
2021–22	(Norway) Gyda Westvold Hansen	(Italy) Annika Sieff	(Slovenia) Ema Volavšek
2022–23	(Germany) Sophia Maurus	(United States) Annika Malacinski	(Poland) Joanna Kil
2023–24	(Poland) Joanna Kil	(Germany) Sophia Maurus	(Germany) Marie Nähring

== See also ==
- FIS Nordic Combined World Cup
- FIS Nordic Combined Grand Prix
