= Jezeršek =

Jezeršek is a Slovene surname. Notable people with the surname include:

- Andrej Jezeršek (born 1982), Slovene skier
- Barbara Jezeršek (born 1986), Slovene-Australian skier
