= Austria at the 2002 Winter Olympics =

- IOC code: AUT
- NOC: Austrian Olympic Committee
- Website: www.olympia.at (in German)

in Salt Lake City
- Competitors: 90 (71 men, 19 women) in 12 sports
- Flag bearers: Angelika Neuner, Luge
- Medals Ranked 10th: Gold 3 Silver 4 Bronze 10 Total 17

Winter Olympics appearances (overview)
- 1924; 1928; 1932; 1936; 1948; 1952; 1956; 1960; 1964; 1968; 1972; 1976; 1980; 1984; 1988; 1992; 1994; 1998; 2002; 2006; 2010; 2014; 2018; 2022; 2026; 2030

Austria competed at the 2002 Winter Olympics in Salt Lake City, United States.

== Medalists ==
Medal	Name	Sport	Event
Gold	Fritz Strobl	Alpine Skiing	Men's downhill
Gold	Stephan Eberharter	Alpine Skiing	Men's giant slalom
Gold	Christian Hoffmann	Cross-Country Skiing	Men's 30 km Freestyle Mass Start
Silver	Stephan Eberharter	Alpine Skiing	Men's super-G
Silver	Renate Götschl	Alpine Skiing	Women's combined
Silver	Mikhail Botwinov	Cross-country skiing	Men's 30 km Freestyle Mass Start
Silver	Martin Rettl	Skeleton	Men's
Bronze	Benjamin Raich	Alpine Skiing	Men's combined
Bronze	Stephan Eberharter	Alpine Skiing	Men's downhill
Bronze	Benjamin Raich	Alpine Skiing	Men's slalom
Bronze	Andreas Schifferer	Alpine Skiing	Men's super-G
Bronze	Renate Götschl	Alpine Skiing	Women's downhill
Bronze	Wolfgang Perner	Biathlon	Men's 10 km Sprint
Bronze	Markus Prock	Luge	Men's Singles
Bronze	Felix Gottwald	Nordic Combined	Men's Individual
Bronze	Felix Gottwald	Nordic Combined	Men's Sprint
Bronze	Christoph Bieler; Michael Gruber; Mario Stecher; Felix Gottwald	Nordic Combined	Men's Team

== Alpine skiing ==
Men

Athlete	Event	Race 1	Race 2	Total	
Athlete	Event	Time	Time	Time	Rank
Christoph Gruber	Downhill			1:41.25	20
Christian Greber	Downhill			1:40.00	6
Stephan Eberharter	Downhill			1:39.41	3rd place, bronze medalist(s)
Fritz Strobl	Downhill			1:39.13	1st place, gold medalist(s)
Christoph Gruber	Super-G			1:22.35	7
Fritz Strobl	Super-G			1:21.92	4
Andreas Schifferer	Super-G			1:21.83	3rd place, bronze medalist(s)
Stephan Eberharter	Super-G			1:21.68	2nd place, silver medalist(s)
Hans Knauß	Giant slalom	DNF	–	DNF	–
Benjamin Raich	Giant slalom	1:12.83	1:11.57	2:24.40	4
Christoph Gruber	Giant slalom	1:12.82	1:11.59	2:24.41	5
Stephan Eberharter	Giant slalom	1:11.98	1:11.30	2:23.28	1st place, gold medalist(s)
Manfred Pranger	Slalom	DNF	–	DNF	–
Rainer Schönfelder	Slalom	DNF	–	DNF	–
Kilian Albrecht	Slalom	50.26	52.19	1:42.45	4
Benjamin Raich	Slalom	49.34	53.07	1:42.41	3rd place, bronze medalist(s)

Men's combined

Athlete	Downhill	Slalom		Total	
Athlete	Time	Time 1	Time 2	Total time	Rank
Kilian Albrecht	1:43.32	46.13	55.50	3:24.95	11
Rainer Schönfelder	1:41.90	45.46	51.31	3:18.67	4
Benjamin Raich	1:41.05	46.30	50.91	3:18.26	3rd place, bronze medalist(s)
Michael Walchhofer	1:39.94	DNF	–	DNF	–

Women

Athlete	Event	Race 1	Race 2	Total	
Athlete	Event	Time	Time	Time	Rank
Brigitte Obermoser	Downhill			1:41.64	18
Michaela Dorfmeister	Downhill			1:40.83	9
Selina Heregger	Downhill			1:40.56	6
Renate Götschl	Downhill			1:40.39	3rd place, bronze medalist(s)
Tanja Schneider	Super-G			DNF	–
Renate Götschl	Super-G			1:14.44	8
Michaela Dorfmeister	Super-G			1:14.08	6
Alexandra Meissnitzer	Super-G			1:13.95	4
Selina Heregger	Giant slalom	1:17.93	DNF	DNF	–
Brigitte Obermoser	Giant slalom	1:17.82	1:15.86	2:33.68	15
Michaela Dorfmeister	Giant slalom	1:16.89	1:15.06	2:31.95	4
Alexandra Meissnitzer	Giant slalom	1:16.49	1:15.46	2:31.95	4
Marlies Schild	Slalom	DNF	–	DNF	–
Christine Sponring	Slalom	55.42	DNF	DNF	–
Carina Raich	Slalom	55.10	DNF	DNF	–
Renate Götschl	Slalom	54.31	DNF	DNF	–

Women's combined

Athlete	Downhill	Slalom		Total	
Athlete	Time	Time 1	Time 2	Total time	Rank
Christine Sponring	DNF	–	DNF	DNF	–
Selina Heregger	1:17.29	47.00	45.40	2:49.69	11
Michaela Dorfmeister	1:15.85	46.76	44.24	2:46.85	5
Renate Götschl	1:15.27	45.66	43.84	2:44.77	2nd place, silver medalist(s)

== Biathlon ==
Men

Event	Athlete	Misses ^{1}	Time	Rank
10 km sprint	Christoph Sumann	DNF	DNF	–
10 km sprint	Ludwig Gredler	2	26:04.3	10
10 km sprint	Wolfgang Rottmann	2	25:48.8	5
10 km sprint	Wolfgang Perner	0	25:44.4	3rd place, bronze medalist(s)
12.5 km pursuit ^{2}	Wolfgang Perner	3	34:00.1	9
12.5 km pursuit ^{2}	Wolfgang Rottmann	4	33:45.1	6
12.5 km pursuit ^{2}	Ludwig Gredler	2	33:35.5	4

Event	Athlete	Time	Misses	Adjusted time ^{3}	Rank
20 km	Daniel Mesotitsch	53:15.9	6	59:15.9	64
20 km	Wolfgang Perner	51:00.4	5	56:00.4	32
20 km	Christoph Sumann	52:00.3	3	55:00.3	22
20 km	Ludwig Gredler	51:19.3	2	53:19.3	11

Men's 4 × 7.5 km relay

Athletes	Race		
Athletes	Misses ^{1}	Time	Rank
Christoph Sumann; Wolfgang Perner; Wolfgang Rottmann; Ludwig Gredler	0	1'26:58.9	6

^{1} A penalty loop of 150 metres had to be skied per missed target.
^{2} Starting delay based on 10 km sprint results.
^{3} One minute added per missed target.

== Bobsleigh ==
Men

Sled	Athletes	Event	Run 1		Run 2		Run 3		Run 4		Total	
Sled	Athletes	Event	Time	Rank	Time	Rank	Time	Rank	Time	Rank	Time	Rank
AUT-1	Martin Schützenauer; Wolfgang Stampfer	Two-man	47.91	8	47.78	7	47.72	6	47.75	6	3:11.16	7

Sled	Athletes	Event	Run 1		Run 2		Run 3		Run 4		Total	
Sled	Athletes	Event	Time	Rank	Time	Rank	Time	Rank	Time	Rank	Time	Rank
AUT-1	Wolfgang Stampfer; Michael Müller; Klaus Seelos; Martin Schützenauer	Four-man	47.19	17	47.27	18	47.51	12	47.60	7	3:09.57	13

== Cross-country skiing ==
Men

Sprint

Athlete	Qualifying round		Quarter finals		Semi finals		Finals	
Athlete	Time	Rank	Time	Rank	Time	Rank	Time	Final rank
Marc Mayer	DSQ	–	did not advance					
Reinhard Neuner	2:56.20	24	did not advance					

Pursuit

Athlete	10 km C		10 km F pursuit^{1}	
Athlete	Time	Rank	Time	Final rank
Marc Mayer	DSQ	–	did not advance	
Achim Walcher	DSQ	–	did not advance	
Mikhail Botvinov	26:32.5	6 Q	24:10.2	9

Event	Athlete	Race	
Event	Athlete	Time	Rank
15 km C	Gerhard Urain	40:38.0	41
15 km C	Alexander Marent	39:36.2	23
30 km F	Achim Walcher	DSQ	–
30 km F	Gerhard Urain	1'14:33.9	23
30 km F	Mikhail Botvinov	1'11:32.3	2nd place, silver medalist(s)
30 km F	Christian Hoffmann	1'11:31.0	1st place, gold medalist(s)
50 km C	Marc Mayer	DSQ	–
50 km C	Mikhail Botvinov	2'09:21.7	5

^{1} Starting delay based on 10 km C. results.
C = Classical style, F = Freestyle

4 × 10 km relay

Athletes	Race	
Athletes	Time	Rank
Alexander Marent; Mikhail Botvinov; Gerhard Urain; Christian Hoffmann	1'34:04.9	4

== Freestyle skiing ==
Women

Athlete	Event	Qualification			Final		
Athlete	Event	Time	Points	Rank	Time	Points	Rank
Margarita Marbler	Moguls	38.36	23.54	8 Q	35.64	23.18	10

== Ice hockey ==
=== Men's tournament ===
==== Preliminary round ====
Top team (shaded) advanced to the first round.

Team	GP	W	L	T	GF	GA	GD	Pts
Germany	3	3	0	0	10	3	+7	6
Latvia	3	1	1	1	11	12	−1	3
Austria	3	1	2	0	7	9	−2	2
Slovakia	3	0	2	1	8	12	−4	1

All times are local (UTC-7).

9 February 2002; 19:00	Latvia	4 – 2 (1–2, 1–2, 0–0)	Austria	Peaks Ice Arena, Provo; Attendance: 6,159

10 February 2002; 16:00	Austria	2 – 3 (0–2, 2–0, 0–1)	Germany	Peaks Ice Arena, Provo; Attendance: 6,444

12 February 2002; 16:00	Slovakia	2 – 3 (1–1, 1–1, 0–1)	Austria	E Center, West Valley City; Attendance: 8,362

==== Consolation round ====
11th place match

14 February 2002; 15:00	Switzerland	4 – 1 (0–0, 2–0, 2–1)	Austria 12th	E Center, West Valley City; Attendance: 7,986

- Team Roster
  - Claus Dalpiaz
  - Reinhard Divis
  - Michael Suttnig
  - Gerhard Unterluggauer
  - Dominic Lavoie
  - Tom Searle
  - Robert Lukas
  - Peter Kasper
  - Andre Lakos
  - Martin Ulrich
  - Christph Brandner
  - Gerald Ressmann
  - Matthias Trattnig
  - Oliver Setzinger
  - Thomas Pöck
  - Kent Salfi
  - Mario Schaden
  - Martin Hohenberger
  - Gunther Lanzinger
  - Simon Wheeldon
  - Wolfgang Kromp
  - Christian Perthaler
  - Dieter Kalt
- Head coach: Ron Kennedy

== Luge ==
Men

Athlete	Run 1		Run 2		Run 3		Run 4		Total	
Athlete	Time	Rank	Time	Rank	Time	Rank	Time	Rank	Time	Rank
Rainer Margreiter	45.034	15	45.076	17	44.626	11	44.901	6	2:59.637	10
Markus Kleinheinz	44.875	10	44.857	9	44.558	9	44.921	8	2:59.211	8
Markus Prock	44.698	4	44.640	3	44.271	1	44.674	2	2:58.283	3rd place, bronze medalist(s)

(Men's) Doubles

Athletes	Run 1		Run 2		Total	
Athletes	Time	Rank	Time	Rank	Time	Rank
Markus Scheigl; Tobias Schiegl	43.208	5	43.310	6	1:26.518	6
Andreas Linger; Wolfgang Linger	43.330	9	43.354	8	1:26.684	8

Women

Athlete	Run 1		Run 2		Run 3		Run 4		Total	
Athlete	Time	Rank	Time	Rank	Time	Rank	Time	Rank	Time	Rank
Simone Eder	43.880	11	43.760	12	43.824	13	43.638	9	2:55.102	11
Sonja Manzenreiter	43.864	10	43.540	6	43.585	7	43.548	8	2:54.537	7
Angelika Neuner	43.683	5	43.440	4	43.601	8	43.438	5	2:54.162	4

== Nordic combined ==
Men's sprint

Events:

- large hill ski jumping
- 7.5 km cross-country skiing (Start delay, based on ski jumping results.)

Athlete	Ski Jumping		Cross-country time	Total rank
Athlete	Points	Rank	Cross-country time	Total rank
Felix Gottwald	110.3	11	17:20.3	3rd place, bronze medalist(s)
Michael Gruber	110.5	9	18:34.0	28
Christoph Bieler	112.7	6	18:01.6	16
Mario Stecher	113.5	5	17:49.5	11

Men's individual

Events:

- normal hill ski jumping
- 15 km cross-country skiing (Start delay, based on ski jumping results.)

Athlete	Ski Jumping		Cross-country time	Total rank
Athlete	Points	Rank	Cross-country time	Total rank
Christoph Eugen	224.5	18	43:26.1	20
Felix Gottwald	235.0	11	40:06.5	3rd place, bronze medalist(s)
Christoph Bieler	255.0	4	42:21.1	15
Mario Stecher	258.0	2	41:30.8	6

Men's Team

Four participants per team.

Events:

- normal hill ski jumping
- 5 km cross-country skiing (Start delay, based on ski jumping results.)

Athletes	Ski jumping		Cross-country time	Total rank
Athletes	Points	Rank	Cross-country time	Total rank
Michael Gruber; Christoph Bieler; Mario Stecher; Felix Gottwald	938.5	2	48:53.2	3rd place, bronze medalist(s)

== Skeleton ==
Men

Athlete	Run 1		Run 2		Total	
Athlete	Time	Rank	Time	Rank	Time	Rank
Christian Auer	51.81	12	51.56	11	1:43.37	12
Martin Rettl	51.02	2	50.99	1	1:42.01	2nd place, silver medalist(s)

== Ski jumping ==
Athlete	Event	Qualifying jump			Final jump 1			Final jump 2		Total	
Athlete	Event	Distance	Points	Rank	Distance	Points	Rank	Distance	Points	Points	Rank
Stefan Horngacher	Normal hill	Pre-qualified			91.5	117.5	14 Q	93.5	122.5	240.0	11
Martin Höllwarth	Normal hill	Pre-qualified			90.0	115.0	22 Q	89.0	113.0	228.0	25
Martin Koch	Normal hill	Pre-qualified			92.5	120.5	9 Q	91.0	116.5	237.0	14
Andreas Widhölzl	Normal hill	Pre-qualified			90.5	115.0	22 Q	90.5	115.5	230.5	24
Martin Höllwarth	Large hill	Pre-qualified			123.5	122.3	11 Q	117.5	111.0	233.3	14
Martin Koch	Large hill	Pre-qualified			126.0	126.3	7 Q	121.5	118.2	244.5	8
Andreas Widhölzl	Large hill	Pre-qualified			120.5	114.9	21 Q	116.5	107.7	222.6	21
Stefan Horngacher	Large hill	Pre-qualified			125.0	123.5	9 Q	124.0	123.7	247.2	5

Men's team large hill

Athletes	Result	
Athletes	Points ^{1}	Rank
Stefan Horngacher; Andreas Widhölzl; Wolfgang Loitzl; Martin Höllwarth	926.8	4

^{1} Four teams members performed two jumps each.

== Snowboarding ==
Men's parallel giant slalom

Athlete	Qualifying		Round one	Quarter final	Semi final	Final	Rank
Athlete	Time	Rank	Round one	Quarter final	Semi final	Final	Rank
Dieter Krassnig	37.02	10 Q	(France) Mathieu Bozzetto L	did not advance			
Stafan Kaltschütz	36.97	9 Q	(Austria) Sigi Grabner L	did not advance			
Sigi Grabner	36.94	8 Q	(Austria) Stefan Kaltschütz W	(France) Nicolas Huet L (DSQ)	did not advance		7
Alexander Maier	36.28	2 Q	(Switzerland) Philipp Schoch L (DSQ)	did not advance			

Women's parallel giant slalom

Athlete	Qualifying		Round one	Quarter final	Semi final	Final	Rank
Athlete	Time	Rank	Round one	Quarter final	Semi final	Final	Rank
Doris Günther	DNF	–	did not advance				
Claudia Riegler	51.87	28	did not advance				
Manuela Riegler	44.04	23	did not advance				
Maria Kirchgasser	41.44	1 Q	(Japan) Ran Iida W	(Poland) Jagna Marczułajtis L (DSQ)	did not advance		5

Women's halfpipe

Athlete	Qualifying round 1		Qualifying round 2		Final	
Athlete	Points	Rank	Points	Rank	Points	Rank
Nicola Pederzolli	34.1	5 QF			35.7	7

== Speed skating ==
Women

Event	Athlete	Race 1		Race 2		Total	
Event	Athlete	Time	Rank	Time	Rank	Time	Rank
500 m	Emese Nemeth-Hunyady	39.38	26	39.51	26	78.89	26
1500 m	Emese Nemeth-Hunyady					1:56.51	12
3000 m	Emese Nemeth-Hunyady					4:06.55	9
