= Arnould =

Arnould is a given name and surname. Notable people with the name include:

== Surname ==
- Derek Clement Arnould, former Canadian diplomat
- Dominique Arnould (born 1966), former professional road, cyclo-cross, and mountain bike cyclist
- Isabelle Arnould (born 1970), retired female freestyle swimmer from Belgium
- Jeanne Sylvanie Arnould-Plessy (1819–1897), French stage actress
- Joseph Arnould (1813–1886), British judge in India and writer
- Kevin Arnould (born 1980), French Nordic combined skier who competed from 2000 to 2006
- Rita Arnould (died 1943), courier of the Red Orchestra resistance group in Belgium
- Robert Arnould (born 1953), American politician
- Roger-Arnould Rivière (1930–1959), French poet
- Sophie Arnould (1740–1802), French operatic soprano

== Given name ==
- Arnould de Vuez (1644–1720), painter of Flemish origin active in Lille from 1695 to 1720
- Arnould Galopin (1865–1934), prolific French writer with more than 50 novels to his credit
