= Alpine skiing at the 2002 Winter Olympics =

Alpine skiing at the XIX Olympic Winter Games
- Venue: Snowbasin (downhill, super-G, combined), Park City (giant slalom), Deer Valley (slalom), Utah, United States
- Dates: 10–23 February 2002
- No. of events: 10
- Competitors: 278 (157 men, 121 women) from 57 nations

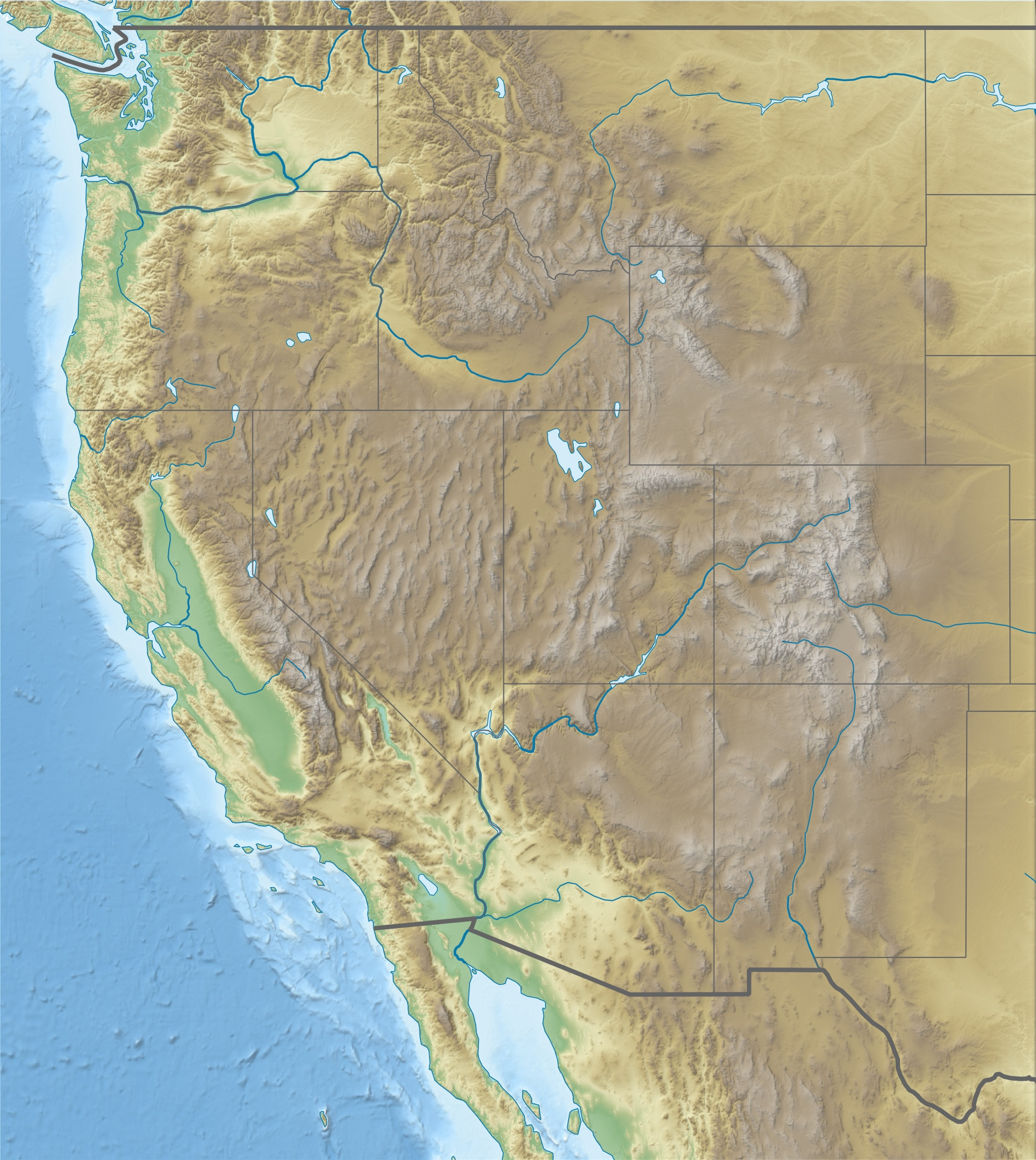
Location in the western United States
Locations in Utah

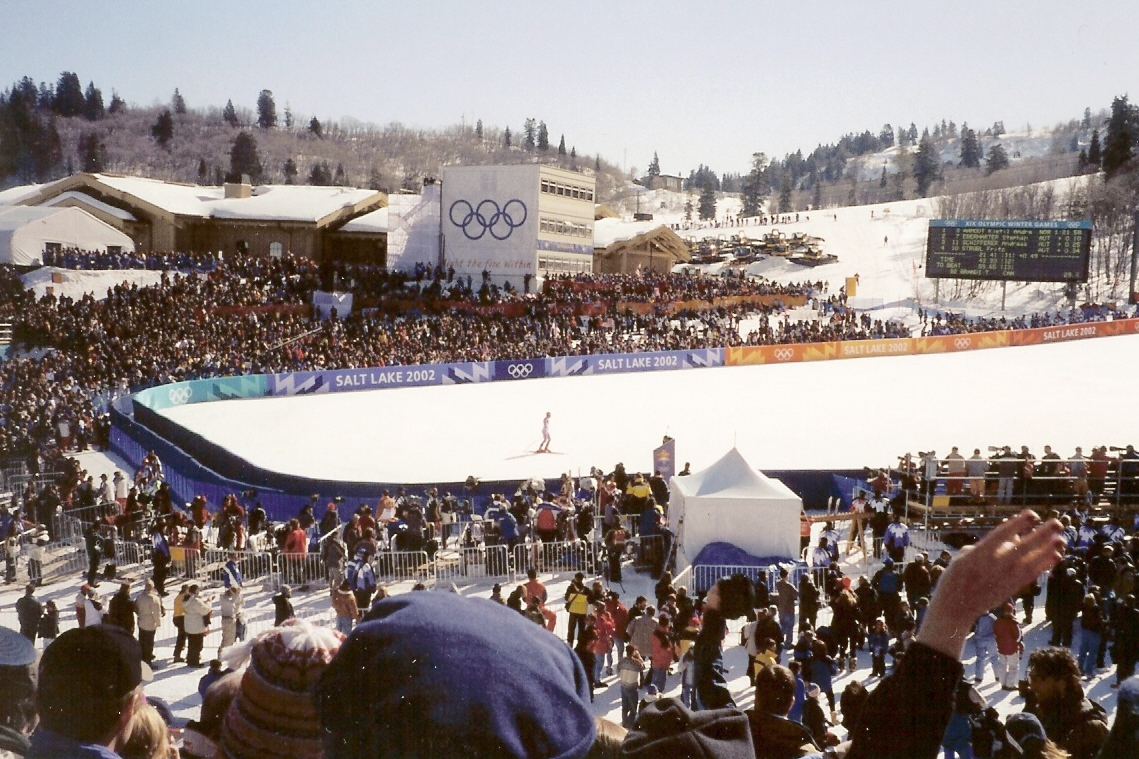
Men's Super G; Snowbasin, 16 February

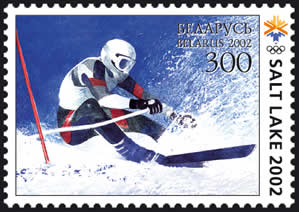
Belarusian postage stamp

Alpine skiing at the 2002 Winter Olympics consisted of ten events held 10–23 February in the United States near Salt Lake City, Utah. The downhill, super-G, and combined events were held at Snowbasin, the giant slaloms at Park City, and the slaloms at adjacent Deer Valley.

== Medal table ==
Rank	Nation	Gold	Silver	Bronze	Total
1	Croatia	3	1	0	4
2	Austria	2	2	5	9
3	France	2	2	0	4
4	Norway	2	1	1	4
5	Italy	1	1	1	3
6	United States	0	2	0	2
7	Sweden	0	1	1	2
8	Germany	0	0	1	1
8	Switzerland	0	0	1	1
Totals (9 entries)		10	10	10	30

=== Men's events ===
Event	Gold		Silver		Bronze	
Downhill	Fritz Strobl; Austria	1:39.13	Lasse Kjus; Norway	1:39.35	Stephan Eberharter; Austria	1:39.41
Combined	Kjetil André Aamodt; Norway	3:17.56	Bode Miller; United States	3:17.84	Benjamin Raich; Austria	3:18.26
Super-G	Kjetil André Aamodt; Norway	1:21.58	Stephan Eberharter; Austria	1:21.68	Andreas Schifferer; Austria	1:21.83
Giant slalom	Stephan Eberharter; Austria	2:23.28	Bode Miller; United States	2:24.16	Lasse Kjus; Norway	2:24.32
Slalom	Jean-Pierre Vidal; France	1:41.06	Sébastien Amiez; France	1:41.82	Benjamin Raich; Austria	1:42.41

=== Women's events ===
Event	Gold		Silver		Bronze	
Downhill	Carole Montillet; France	1:39.56	Isolde Kostner; Italy	1:40.01	Renate Götschl; Austria	1:40.39
Combined	Janica Kostelić; Croatia	2:43.28	Renate Götschl; Austria	2:44.77	Martina Ertl; Germany	2:45.16
Super-G	Daniela Ceccarelli; Italy	1:13.59	Janica Kostelić; Croatia	1:13.64	Karen Putzer; Italy	1:13.86
Giant slalom	Janica Kostelić; Croatia	2:30.01	Anja Pärson; Sweden	2:31.33	Sonja Nef; Switzerland	2:31.67
Slalom	Janica Kostelić; Croatia	1:46.10	Laure Pequegnot; France	1:46.17	Anja Pärson; Sweden	1:47.09

== Participating NOCs ==
Fifty nations competed in the alpine skiing events at Salt Lake City.

- Andorra
- Argentina
- Armenia
- Australia
- Austria
- Azerbaijan
- Bosnia and Herzegovina
- Brazil
- Bulgaria
- Canada
- Chile
- Croatia
- Cyprus
- Czech Republic
- Fiji
- Finland
- France
- Georgia
- Germany
- Greece
- Great Britain
- Hungary
- Iceland
- Iran
- Ireland
- Italy
- Japan
- Kazakhstan
- Latvia
- Lebanon
- Liechtenstein
- Macedonia
- New Zealand
- Norway
- Poland
- Romania
- Russia
- San Marino
- Slovakia
- Slovenia
- South Africa
- South Korea
- Spain
- Sweden
- Switzerland
- Tajikistan
- Turkey
- Ukraine
- United States
- FR Yugoslavia

== Course information ==
Date	Race	Start elevation	Finish elevation	Vertical drop	Course length	Average gradient
Sun 10 Feb	Downhill – men	2,831 m (9,288 ft)	1,948 m (6,391 ft)	883 m (2,897 ft)	2.860 km (1.777 mi)	30.9%
Tue 12 Feb	Downhill – women	2,748 m (9,016 ft)	1,948 m (6,391 ft)	800 m (2,625 ft)	2.694 km (1.674 mi)	29.7%
Wed 13 Feb	Downhill (K) – men	2,787 m (9,144 ft)	1,948 m (6,391 ft)	839 m (2,753 ft)	2.679 km (1.665 mi)	31.3%
Thu 14 Feb	Downhill (K) – women	2,655 m (8,711 ft)	1,948 m (6,391 ft)	707 m (2,320 ft)	2.237 km (1.390 mi)	31.6%
Sat 16 Feb	Super-G – men	2,596 m (8,517 ft)	1,948 m (6,391 ft)	648 m (2,126 ft)	2.068 km (1.285 mi)	31.3%
Sun 17 Feb	Super-G – women	2,548 m (8,360 ft)	1,948 m (6,391 ft)	600 m (1,969 ft)	1.944 km (1.208 mi)	30.9%
Thu 21 Feb	Giant slalom – men	2,510 m (8,235 ft)	2,120 m (6,955 ft)	390 m (1,280 ft)		
Fri 22 Feb	Giant slalom – women	2,510 m (8,235 ft)	2,120 m (6,955 ft)	390 m (1,280 ft)		
Sat 23 Feb	Slalom – men	2,488 m (8,163 ft)	2,274 m (7,461 ft)	214 m (702 ft)		
Wed 20 Feb	Slalom – women	2,488 m (8,163 ft)	2,274 m (7,461 ft)	214 m (702 ft)		
Wed 13 Feb	Slalom (K) – men	2,113 m (6,932 ft)	1,948 m (6,391 ft)	165 m (541 ft)		
Thu 14 Feb	Slalom (K) – women	2,100 m (6,890 ft)	1,948 m (6,391 ft)	152 m (499 ft)		

Snowbasin hosted the downhill, super-G, and combined events; the giant slaloms were at Park City and the slaloms at adjacent Deer Valley

== See also ==
- Alpine skiing at the 2002 Winter Paralympics
