= Norway at the 2002 Winter Olympics =

- IOC code: NOR
- NOC: Norwegian Olympic Committee and Confederation of Sports
- Website: www.idrett.no (in Norwegian)

in Salt Lake City
- Competitors: 77 (50 men, 27 women) in 11 sports
- Flag bearer: Liv Grete Skjelbreid-Poirée (biathlon)
- Medals Ranked 1st: Gold 13 Silver 5 Bronze 7 Total 25

Winter Olympics appearances (overview)
- 1924; 1928; 1932; 1936; 1948; 1952; 1956; 1960; 1964; 1968; 1972; 1976; 1980; 1984; 1988; 1992; 1994; 1998; 2002; 2006; 2010; 2014; 2018; 2022; 2026

Norway competed at the 2002 Winter Olympics in Salt Lake City, United States. The nation enjoyed its best ever results in gold medals, most notably in the biathlon events, when Ole Einar Bjørndalen swept all four gold medals.

With 13 gold medals, Norway tied the Soviet Union at the 1976 Winter Olympics for most gold medals a country won at a Winter Olympics. However, Canada broke this record with 14 when they hosted the Vancouver games.

== Medalists ==
| Medal | Name | Sport | Event |
|---|---|---|---|
| Gold | Kjetil André Aamodt | Alpine skiing | Men's super-G |
| Gold | Kjetil André Aamodt | Alpine skiing | Men's combined |
| Gold | Ole Einar Bjørndalen | Biathlon | Men's 10 km sprint |
| Gold | Ole Einar Bjørndalen | Biathlon | Men's 12.5 km pursuit |
| Gold | Ole Einar Bjørndalen | Biathlon | Men's 20 km |
| Gold | Frode Andresen; Ole Einar Bjørndalen; Egil Gjelland; Halvard Hanevold | Biathlon | Men's 4 × 7.5 km relay |
| Gold | Tor Arne Hetland | Cross country skiing | Men's sprint |
| Gold | Frode Estil | Cross country skiing | Men's pursuit (tie) |
| Gold | Thomas Alsgaard | Cross country skiing | Men's pursuit (tie) |
| Gold | Thomas Alsgaard; Anders Aukland; Frode Estil; Kristen Skjeldal | Cross country skiing | Men's 4 × 10 km relay |
| Gold | Bente Skari | Cross country skiing | Women's 10 km (classical style) |
| Gold | Torger Nergård; Bent Ånund Ramsfjell; Flemming Davanger; Lars Vågberg; Pål Trulsen | Curling | Men's competition |
| Gold | Kari Traa | Freestyle skiing | Women's moguls |
| Silver | Lasse Kjus | Alpine skiing | Men's downhill |
| Silver | Liv Grete Poiree | Biathlon | Women's 15 km |
| Silver | Gunn Margit Andreassen; Liv Grete Poiree; Ann Elen Skjelbreid; Linda Tjørhom | Biathlon | Women's 4 × 7.5 km relay |
| Silver | Frode Estil | Cross country skiing | Men's 15 km (classical style) |
| Silver | Marit Bjørgen; Bente Skari; Hilde Gjermundshaug Pedersen; Anita Moen | Cross country skiing | Women's 4 × 5 km relay |
| Bronze | Lasse Kjus | Alpine skiing | Men's giant slalom |
| Bronze | Kristen Skjeldal | Cross country skiing | Men's 30 km (freestyle, mass start) |
| Bronze | Odd-Bjørn Hjelmeset | Cross country skiing | Men's 50 km (classical style) |
| Bronze | Anita Moen | Cross country skiing | Women's sprint |
| Bronze | Bente Skari | Cross country skiing | Women's 30 km (classical style) |
| Bronze | Ådne Søndrål | Speed skating | Men's 1500 m |
| Bronze | Lasse Sætre | Speed skating | Men's 10,000 m |

== Alpine skiing ==
Men

| Athlete | Event | Race 1 | Race 2 | Total | |
| Athlete | Event | Time | Time | Time | Rank |
|---|---|---|---|---|---|
| Kenneth Sivertsen | Downhill | | | 1:41.70 | 25 |
| Bjarne Solbakken | Downhill | | | 1:40.74 | 12 |
| Kjetil André Aamodt | Downhill | | | 1:39.78 | 4 |
| Lasse Kjus | Downhill | | | 1:39.35 | 2nd place, silver medalist(s) |
| Lasse Kjus | Super-G | | | DNF | – |
| Kenneth Sivertsen | Super-G | | | 1:24.16 | 19 |
| Bjarne Solbakken | Super-G | | | 1:22.10 | 5 |
| Kjetil André Aamodt | Super-G | | | 1:21.58 | 1st place, gold medalist(s) |
| Kenneth Sivertsen | Giant Slalom | 1:14.16 | 1:12.35 | 2:26.51 | 20 |
| Bjarne Solbakken | Giant Slalom | 1:13.15 | 1:11.35 | 2:24.50 | 6 |
| Kjetil André Aamodt | Giant Slalom | 1:13.14 | 1:11.48 | 2:24.62 | 7 |
| Lasse Kjus | Giant Slalom | 1:12.79 | 1:11.53 | 2:24.32 | 3rd place, bronze medalist(s) |
| Truls Ove Karlsen | Slalom | DNF | – | DNF | – |
| Ole Kristian Furuseth | Slalom | 51.03 | 53.36 | 1:44.39 | 9 |
| Tom Stiansen | Slalom | 50.74 | 54.45 | 1:45.19 | 12 |
| Kjetil André Aamodt | Slalom | 49.92 | 52.80 | 1:42.72 | 6 |

Men's combined

| Athlete | Downhill | Slalom | | Total | |
| Athlete | Time | Time 1 | Time 2 | Total time | Rank |
|---|---|---|---|---|---|
| Truls Ove Karlsen | 1:41.85 | DNF | – | DNF | – |
| Lasse Kjus | 1:38.97 | 47.72 | 53.11 | 3:19.80 | 5 |
| Kjetil André Aamodt | 1:38.79 | 46.88 | 51.89 | 3:17.56 | 1st place, gold medalist(s) |

Women

| Athlete | Event | Race 1 | Race 2 | Total | |
| Athlete | Event | Time | Time | Time | Rank |
|---|---|---|---|---|---|
| Ingeborg Helen Marken | Downhill | | | 1:41.08 | 13 |
| Ingeborg Helen Marken | Super-G | | | DNF | – |
| Stine Hofgaard Nilsen | Giant Slalom | DNF | – | DNF | – |
| Andrine Flemmen | Giant Slalom | DNF | – | DNF | – |
| Trine Bakke-Rognmo | Slalom | DNF | – | DNF | – |
| Hedda Berntsen | Slalom | DNF | – | DNF | – |

== Biathlon ==
Men

| Event | Athlete | Misses ^{1} | Time | Rank |
|---|---|---|---|---|
| 10 km sprint | Egil Gjelland | 1 | 26:42.5 | 24 |
| 10 km sprint | Halvard Hanevold | 0 | 26:12.5 | 13 |
| 10 km sprint | Frode Andresen | 2 | 25:51.5 | 8 |
| 10 km sprint | Ole Einar Bjørndalen | 0 | 24:51.3 | 1st place, gold medalist(s) |
| 12.5 km pursuit ^{2} | Egil Gjelland | 1 | 34:16.9 | 15 |
| 12.5 km pursuit ^{2} | Frode Andresen | 5 | 34:14.5 | 14 |
| 12.5 km pursuit ^{2} | Halvard Hanevold | 2 | 33:59.6 | 8 |
| 12.5 km pursuit ^{2} | Ole Einar Bjørndalen | 2 | 32:34.6 | 1st place, gold medalist(s) |

| Event | Athlete | Time | Misses | Adjusted time ^{3} | Rank |
|---|---|---|---|---|---|
| 20 km | Egil Gjelland | 52:16.1 | 2 | 54:16.1 | 16 |
| 20 km | Frode Andresen | 49:39.1 | 3 | 52:39.1 | 7 |
| 20 km | Halvard Hanevold | 52:16.3 | 0 | 52:16.3 | 5 |
| 20 km | Ole Einar Bjørndalen | 49:03.3 | 2 | 51:03.3 | 1st place, gold medalist(s) |

Men's 4 × 7.5 km relay

| Athletes | Race | | |
| Athletes | Misses ^{1} | Time | Rank |
|---|---|---|---|
| Halvard Hanevold; Frode Andresen; Egil Gjelland; Ole Einar Bjørndalen | 0 | 1'23:42.3 | 1st place, gold medalist(s) |

Women

| Event | Athlete | Misses ^{1} | Time | Rank |
|---|---|---|---|---|
| 7.5 km sprint | Gro Marit Istad Kristiansen | 4 | 24:12.7 | 53 |
| 7.5 km sprint | Ann Elen Skjelbreid | 3 | 23:14.2 | 38 |
| 7.5 km sprint | Gunn Margit Andreassen | 1 | 22:19.7 | 16 |
| 7.5 km sprint | Liv Grete Skjelbreid-Poirée | 1 | 21:24.1 | 4 |
| 10 km pursuit ^{4} | Gro Marit Istad Kristiansen | 4 | 36:13.9 | 40 |
| 10 km pursuit ^{4} | Ann Elen Skjelbreid | 6 | 35:56.6 | 39 |
| 10 km pursuit ^{4} | Gunn Margit Andreassen | 2 | 32:56.8 | 16 |
| 10 km pursuit ^{4} | Liv Grete Skjelbreid-Poirée | 4 | 31:18.3 | 4 |

| Event | Athlete | Time | Misses | Adjusted time ^{3} | Rank |
|---|---|---|---|---|---|
| 15 km | Linda Tjørhom | 48:34.0 | 4 | 52:34.0 | 39 |
| 15 km | Gunn Margit Andreassen | 48:42.9 | 3 | 51:42.9 | 30 |
| 15 km | Ann Elen Skjelbreid | 47:51.1 | 3 | 50:51.1 | 22 |
| 15 km | Liv Grete Skjelbreid-Poirée | 46:37.0 | 1 | 47:37.0 | 2nd place, silver medalist(s) |

Women's 4 × 7.5 km relay

| Athletes | Race | | |
| Athletes | Misses ^{1} | Time | Rank |
|---|---|---|---|
| Ann Elen Skjelbreid; Linda Tjørhom; Gunn Margit Andreassen; Liv Grete Skjelbreid-Poirée | 0 | 1'28:25.6 | 2nd place, silver medalist(s) |

^{1} A penalty loop of 150 metres had to be skied per missed target.
^{2} Starting delay based on 10 km sprint results.
^{3} One minute added per missed target.
^{4} Starting delay based on 7.5 km sprint results.

== Bobsleigh ==
Men

| Sled | Athletes | Event | Run 1 | | Run 2 | | Run 3 | | Run 4 | | Total | |
| Sled | Athletes | Event | Time | Rank | Time | Rank | Time | Rank | Time | Rank | Time | Rank |
|---|---|---|---|---|---|---|---|---|---|---|---|---|
| NOR-1 | Arnfinn Kristiansen; Bjarne Røyland | Two-man | 48.34 | 19 | 48.21 | 17 | 48.46 | 21 | 48.17 | 13 | 3:13.18 | 20 |

| Sled | Athletes | Event | Run 1 | | Run 2 | | Run 3 | | Run 4 | | Total | |
| Sled | Athletes | Event | Time | Rank | Time | Rank | Time | Rank | Time | Rank | Time | Rank |
|---|---|---|---|---|---|---|---|---|---|---|---|---|
| NOR-1 | Arnfinn Kristiansen; Ole Christian Strømberg; Bjarne Røyland; Mariusz Musial | Four-man | 47.02 | 11 | 47.18 | 16 | 47.84 | 18 | DNF | – | DNF | – |

== Cross-country skiing ==
Men

Sprint

| Athlete | Qualifying round | | Quarter finals | | Semi finals | | Finals | |
| Athlete | Time | Rank | Time | Rank | Time | Rank | Time | Final rank |
|---|---|---|---|---|---|---|---|---|
| Trond Einar Elden | 2:53.31 | 12 Q | 2:58.1 | 4 | did not advance | | | |
| Tor-Arne Hetland | 2:51.19 | 6 Q | 2:57.2 | 1 Q | 2:59.9 | 2 Q | 2:56.9 | 1st place, gold medalist(s) |
| Trond Iversen | 2:51.09 | 4 Q | 2:56.8 | 2 Q | 3:10.5 | 3 QB | 2:56.6 | 6 |
| Håvard Bjerkeli | 2:50.07 | 1 Q | 3:05.8 | 4 | did not advance | | | |

Pursuit

| Athlete | 10 km C | | 10 km F pursuit^{1} | |
| Athlete | Time | Rank | Time | Final rank |
|---|---|---|---|---|
| Thomas Alsgaard | 26:56.4 | 15 Q | 23:41.9 | 1st place, gold medalist(s) |
| Kristen Skjeldal | 26:55.5 | 13 Q | 24:50.6 | 22 |
| Anders Aukland | 26:27.6 | 2 Q | 24:03.8 | 7 |
| Frode Estil | 26:20.4 | 1 Q | 23:41.9 | 1st place, gold medalist(s) |

| Event | Athlete | Race | |
| Event | Athlete | Time | Rank |
|---|---|---|---|
| 15 km C | Odd-Bjørn Hjelmeset | 39:31.4 | 20 |
| 15 km C | Erling Jevne | 38:13.6 | 6 |
| 15 km C | Anders Aukland | 38:08.3 | 4 |
| 15 km C | Frode Estil | 37:43.4 | 2nd place, silver medalist(s) |
| 30 km F | Tor-Arne Hetland | 1'18:28.5 | 49 |
| 30 km F | Thomas Alsgaard | 1'13:30.2 | 12 |
| 30 km F | Ole Einar Bjørndalen | 1'11:44.5 | 5 |
| 30 km F | Kristen Skjeldal | 1'11:42.7 | 3rd place, bronze medalist(s) |
| 50 km C | Erling Jevne | 2'12:06.6 | 10 |
| 50 km C | Frode Estil | 2'10:44.8 | 9 |
| 50 km C | Anders Aukland | 2'10:05.7 | 7 |
| 50 km C | Odd-Bjørn Hjelmeset | 2'08:41.5 | 3rd place, bronze medalist(s) |

^{1} Starting delay based on 10 km C. results.
C = Classical style, F = Freestyle

4 × 10 km relay

| Athletes | Race | |
| Athletes | Time | Rank |
|---|---|---|
| Anders Aukland; Frode Estil; Kristen Skjeldal; Thomas Alsgaard | 1'32:45.5 | 1st place, gold medalist(s) |

Women

Sprint

| Athlete | Qualifying round | | Quarter finals | | Semi finals | | Finals | |
| Athlete | Time | Rank | Time | Rank | Time | Rank | Time | Final rank |
|---|---|---|---|---|---|---|---|---|
| Vibeke Skofterud | 3:20.21 | 21 | did not advance | | | | | |
| Hilde Gjermundshaug Pedersen | 3:19.79 | 19 | did not advance | | | | | |
| Maj Helen Sorkmo | 3:17.10 | 11 Q | 3:44.2 | 3 ADV | 3:19.4 | 3 QB | 3:25.5 | 6 |
| Anita Moen | 3:14.13 | 4 Q | 3:15.9 | 2 Q | 3:23.8 | 1 Q | 3:12.7 | 3rd place, bronze medalist(s) |

Pursuit

| Athlete | 5 km C | | 5 km F pursuit^{2} | |
| Athlete | Time | Rank | Time | Final rank |
|---|---|---|---|---|
| Vibeke Skofterud | 14:12.3 | 34 Q | 13:28.5 | 28 |
| Tina Bay | 13:53.7 | 20 Q | 13:24.5 | 26 |
| Hilde Gjermundshaug Pedersen | 13:44.7 | 13 Q | 13:07.8 | 14 |
| Bente Skari | 13:11.7 | 2 Q | 12:16.0 | 6 |

| Event | Athlete | Race | |
| Event | Athlete | Time | Rank |
|---|---|---|---|
| 10 km C | Tina Bay | 30:16.3 | 25 |
| 10 km C | Anita Moen | 29:15.5 | 9 |
| 10 km C | Hilde Gjermundshaug Pedersen | 28:56.2 | 6 |
| 10 km C | Bente Skari | 28:05.6 | 1st place, gold medalist(s) |
| 15 km F | Maj Helen Sorkmo | DNF | – |
| 15 km F | Marit Bjørgen | 47:07.4 | 50 |
| 15 km F | Vibeke Skofterud | 42:50.9 | 28 |
| 15 km F | Hilde Gjermundshaug Pedersen | 41:47.8 | 14 |
| 30 km C | Marit Bjørgen | 1'37:02.6 | 14 |
| 30 km C | Vibeke Skofterud | 1'35:02.3 | 8 |
| 30 km C | Anita Moen | 1'31:37.3 | 4 |
| 30 km C | Bente Skari | 1'31:36.3 | 3rd place, bronze medalist(s) |

^{2} Starting delay based on 5 km C. results.
C = Classical style, F = Freestyle

4 × 5 km relay

| Athletes | Race | |
| Athletes | Time | Rank |
|---|---|---|
| Marit Bjørgen; Bente Skari; Hilde Gjermundshaug Pedersen; Anita Moen | 49:31.9 | 2nd place, silver medalist(s) |

== Curling ==
=== Men's tournament ===
==== Group stage ====
Top four teams advanced to semi-finals.

| Country | Skip | W | L |
|---|---|---|---|
| Canada | Kevin Martin | 8 | 1 |
| Norway | Pål Trulsen | 7 | 2 |
| Switzerland | Andreas Schwaller | 6 | 3 |
| Sweden | Peja Lindholm | 6 | 3 |
| Finland | Markku Uusipaavalniemi | 5 | 4 |
| Germany | Sebastian Stock | 4 | 5 |
| Denmark | Ulrik Schmidt | 3 | 6 |
| (United Kingdom) Great Britain | Hammy McMillan | 3 | 6 |
| United States | Tim Somerville | 3 | 6 |
| France | Dominique Dupont-Roc | 0 | 9 |

| Team 1 | Score | Team 2 |
|---|---|---|
| Norway | 4–5 | Switzerland |
| France | 2–9 | Norway |
| United Kingdom | 6–7 | Norway |
| Norway | 6–5 | United States |
| Norway | 9–4 | Denmark |
| Finland | 5–6 | Norway |
| Norway | 10–5 | Germany |
| Canada | 9–4 | Norway |
| Sweden | 8–9 | Norway |

==== Medal round ====
Semi-final

| Sheet D | 1 | 2 | 3 | 4 | 5 | 6 | 7 | 8 | 9 | 10 | 11 | Final |
|---|---|---|---|---|---|---|---|---|---|---|---|---|
| Norway (Trulsen) | 0 | 0 | 1 | 0 | 1 | 0 | 1 | 0 | 2 | 1 | 1 | 7 |
| Switzerland (Schwaller) | 0 | 1 | 0 | 3 | 0 | 1 | 0 | 1 | 0 | 0 | 0 | 6 |

Gold medal game

| Sheet C | 1 | 2 | 3 | 4 | 5 | 6 | 7 | 8 | 9 | 10 | Final |
|---|---|---|---|---|---|---|---|---|---|---|---|
| Canada (Martin) | 0 | 0 | 0 | 0 | 2 | 1 | 0 | 2 | 0 | 0 | 5 |
| Norway (Trulsen) (gold) | 0 | 1 | 0 | 2 | 0 | 0 | 1 | 0 | 1 | 1 | 6 |

Contestants

Norway
Stabekk CC, Oslo

Skip: Pål Trulsen
Third: Lars Vågberg
Second: Flemming Davanger
Lead: Bent Ånund Ramsfjell
Alternate: Torger Nergård

=== Women's tournament ===
==== Group stage ====
Top four teams advanced to semi-finals.

| Country | Skip | W | L |
|---|---|---|---|
| Canada | Kelley Law | 8 | 1 |
| Switzerland | Luzia Ebnöther | 7 | 2 |
| United States | Kari Erickson | 6 | 3 |
| (United Kingdom) Great Britain | Rhona Martin | 5 | 4 |
| Germany | Natalie Neßler | 5 | 4 |
| Sweden | Elisabet Gustafson | 5 | 4 |
| Norway 7th | Dordi Nordby | 4 | 5 |
| Japan | Akiko Katoh | 2 | 7 |
| Denmark | Lene Bidstrup | 2 | 7 |
| Russia | Olga Jarkova | 1 | 8 |

| Team 1 | Score | Team 2 |
|---|---|---|
| United Kingdom | 10–6 | Norway |
| Canada | 6–5 | Norway |
| Norway | 5–7 | Switzerland |
| Germany | 5–10 | Norway |
| Sweden | 10–3 | Norway |
| Norway | 5–4 | Russia |
| Japan | 5–8 | Norway |
| Norway | 9–4 | Denmark |
| Norway | 2–11 | United States |

Contestants

Norway
Snarøen CC, Oslo

Skip: Dordi Nordby
Third: Hanne Woods
Second: Marianne Haslum
Lead: Camilla Holth
Alternate: Kristin Løvseth

== Freestyle skiing ==
Women

| Athlete | Event | Qualification | | | Final | | |
| Athlete | Event | Time | Points | Rank | Time | Points | Rank |
|---|---|---|---|---|---|---|---|
| Ingrid Berntsen | Moguls | 38.32 | 22.28 | 17 | did not advance | | |
| Kari Traa | Moguls | 36.67 | 25.11 | 1 Q | 34.48 | 25.94 | 1st place, gold medalist(s) |
| Hilde Synnøve Lid | Aerials | | 148.82 | 16 | did not advance | | |

== Nordic combined ==
Men's sprint

Events:

- large hill ski jumping
- 7.5 km cross-country skiing (Start delay, based on ski jumping results.)

| Athlete | Ski Jumping | | Cross-country time | Total rank |
| Athlete | Points | Rank | Cross-country time | Total rank |
|---|---|---|---|---|
| Jan Rune Grave | 94.3 | 33 | 18:33.2 | 26 |
| Preben Fjære Brynemo | 96.8 | 30 | 18:35.5 | 30 |
| Kristian Hammer | 98.3 | 29 | 18:21.0 | 20 |
| Sverre Rotevatn | 100.0 | 28 | 17:54.4 | 13 |

Men's individual

Events:

- normal hill ski jumping
- 15 km cross-country skiing (Start delay, based on ski jumping results.)

| Athlete | Ski Jumping | | Cross-country time | Total rank |
| Athlete | Points | Rank | Cross-country time | Total rank |
|---|---|---|---|---|
| Sverre Rotevatn | 189.5 | 41 | 45:24.6 | 36 |
| Jan Rune Grave | 207.0 | 35 | 44:18.5 | 24 |
| Preben Fjære Brynemo | 212.0 | 30 | 43:50.3 | 22 |
| Kristian Hammer | 221.5 | 22 | 41:40.8 | 8 |

Men's Team

Four participants per team.

Events:

- normal hill ski jumping
- 5 km cross-country skiing (Start delay, based on ski jumping results.)

| Athletes | Ski jumping | | Cross-country time | Total rank |
| Athletes | Points | Rank | Cross-country time | Total rank |
|---|---|---|---|---|
| Sverre Rotevatn; Kristian Hammer; Jan Rune Grave; Preben Fjære Brynemo | 791.5 | 10 | 51:22.1 | 5 |

== Skeleton ==
Men

| Athlete | Run 1 | | Run 2 | | Total | |
| Athlete | Time | Rank | Time | Rank | Time | Rank |
|---|---|---|---|---|---|---|
| Snorre Pedersen | 52.07 | 17 | 51.70 | 12 | 1:43.77 | 14 |

== Ski jumping ==
| Athlete | Event | Qualifying jump | | | Final jump 1 | | | Final jump 2 | | Total | |
| Athlete | Event | Distance | Points | Rank | Distance | Points | Rank | Distance | Points | Points | Rank |
|---|---|---|---|---|---|---|---|---|---|---|---|
| Roar Ljøkelsøy | Normal hill | 87.5 | 109.0 | 21 Q | 91.5 | 119.0 | 11 Q | 90.0 | 114.5 | 233.5 | 18 |
| Lars Bystøl | Normal hill | 88.0 | 109.5 | 20 Q | 88.5 | 110.5 | 30 Q | 86.5 | 104.5 | 215.0 | 31 |
| Tommy Ingebrigtsen | Normal hill | 89.0 | 110.5 | 18 Q | 91.5 | 116.5 | 20 Q | 91.0 | 115.5 | 232.0 | 20 |
| Anders Bardal | Normal hill | 91.0 | 116.0 | 9 Q | 91.0 | 116.5 | 20 Q | 89.0 | 110.5 | 227.0 | 27 |
| Lars Bystøl | Large hill | 107.5 | 88.5 | 30 Q | 113.0 | 99.4 | 38 | did not advance | | | |
| Roar Ljøkelsøy | Large hill | 111.0 | 96.8 | 23 Q | 116.5 | 107.2 | 32 | did not advance | | | |
| Tommy Ingebrigtsen | Large hill | 112.0 | 97.6 | 20 Q | 119.0 | 110.7 | 25 | 112.0 | 97.1 | 207.8 | 26 |
| Anders Bardal | Large hill | 112.5 | 99.5 | 16 Q | 118.5 | 110.3 | 27 Q | 114.5 | 102.6 | 212.9 | 25 |

Men's team large hill

| Athletes | Result | |
| Athletes | Points ^{1} | Rank |
|---|---|---|
| Tommy Ingebrigtsen; Lars Bystøl; Anders Bardal; Roar Ljøkelsøy | 790.8 | 9 |

^{1} Four teams members performed two jumps each.

== Snowboarding ==
Men's halfpipe

| Athlete | Qualifying round 1 | | Qualifying round 2 | | Final | |
| Athlete | Points | Rank | Points | Rank | Points | Rank |
|---|---|---|---|---|---|---|
| Kim Christiansen | 23.3 | 24 | 37.0 | 8 | did not advance | |
| Halvor Skramstad Lunn | 30.0 | 18 | 21.7 | 25 | did not advance | |
| Daniel Franck | 39.9 | 3 QF | | | 37.4 | 10 |

Women's halfpipe

| Athlete | Qualifying round 1 | | Qualifying round 2 | | Final | |
| Athlete | Points | Rank | Points | Rank | Points | Rank |
|---|---|---|---|---|---|---|
| Stine Brun Kjeldaas | 27.1 | 11 | 30.9 | 7 | did not advance | |
| Lisa Wiik | 33.1 | 6 QF | | | 28.9 | 10 |
| Kjersti Buaas | 38.7 | 2 QF | | | 37.3 | 4 |

== Speed skating ==
Men

| Event | Athlete | Race 1 | | Race 2 | | Total | |
| Event | Athlete | Time | Rank | Time | Rank | Time | Rank |
|---|---|---|---|---|---|---|---|
| 500 m | Grunde Njøs | 1:37.67 | 37 | 35.90 | 30 | 133.57 | 35 |
| 1000 m | Grunde Njøs | | | | | 1:11.31 | 39 |
| 1000 m | Petter Andersen | | | | | 1:10.14 | 28 |
| 1000 m | Ådne Søndrål | | | | | 1:08.64 | 11 |
| 1500 m | Eskil Ervik | | | | | 1:49.24 | 35 |
| 1500 m | Petter Andersen | | | | | 1:47.21 | 20 |
| 1500 m | Ådne Søndrål | | | | | 1:45.26 | 3rd place, bronze medalist(s) |
| 5000 m | Stian Bjørge | | | | | 6:36.04 | 26 |
| 5000 m | Eskil Ervik | | | | | 6:32.80 | 21 |
| 5000 m | Lasse Sætre | | | | | 6:25.92 | 10 |
| 10,000 m | Kjell Storelid | | | | | 13:27.24 | 8 |
| 10,000 m | Lasse Sætre | | | | | 13:16.92 | 3rd place, bronze medalist(s) |
