= Kilian Albrecht =

Austrian alpine skier (born 1973)

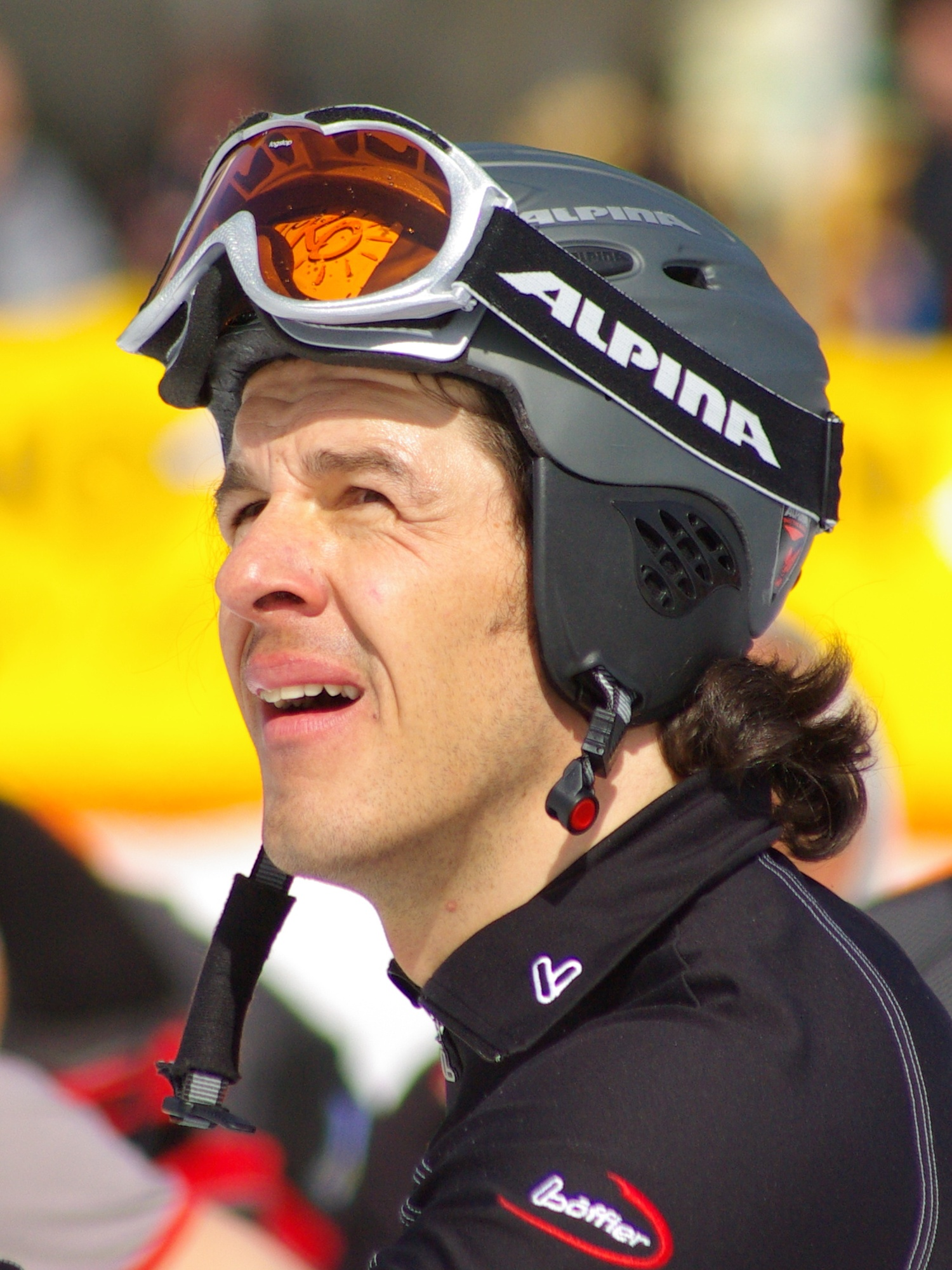
Albrecht in 2008

Kilian Albrecht (Bulgarian: Килиан Албрехт; born 13 April 1973 in Vorarlberg) is an Austrian former alpine skier who represented both Austria and Bulgaria. He competed for Austria at the 2002 Olympics and for Bulgaria at the 2010 Olympics. His best result was a 4th-place finish in the slalom in 2002, missing a medal by only .04 of a second.

Albrecht has won two medals, both silvers, on the FIS World Cup. Both have been in slalom. The first was in 2000 at Kitzbuehel, the second in 2002 at Sestriere.

Since retiring, Albrecht has gone into sports management, most notably managing slalom World Cup winner, World Champion and Olympic champion Mikaela Shiffrin. In 2009, Albrecht was elected chairman of the International Ski Federation's Athletes' Commission for four years. He was succeeded in 2013 by cross-country skier Kikkan Randall. Albrecht is currently manager of slalom star Mikaela Shiffrin.
