= Biathlon at the 2002 Winter Olympics =

Biathlon at the XIX Olympic Winter Games
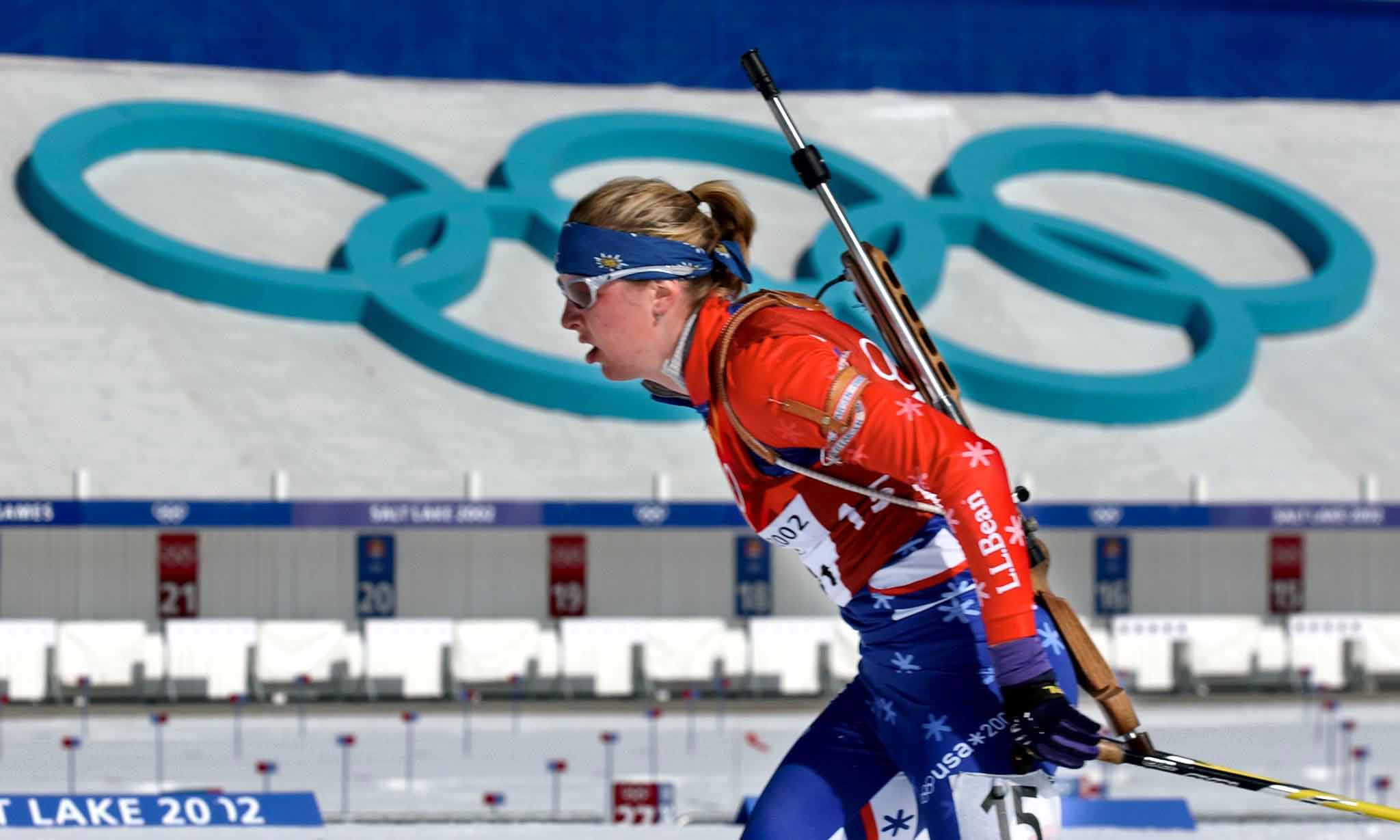
- Andrea Nahrgang competing at Soldier Hollow at the 2002 Winter Olympics.
- Venue: Soldier Hollow
- Dates: 9–20 February
- No. of events: 8
- Competitors: 190 from 34 nations

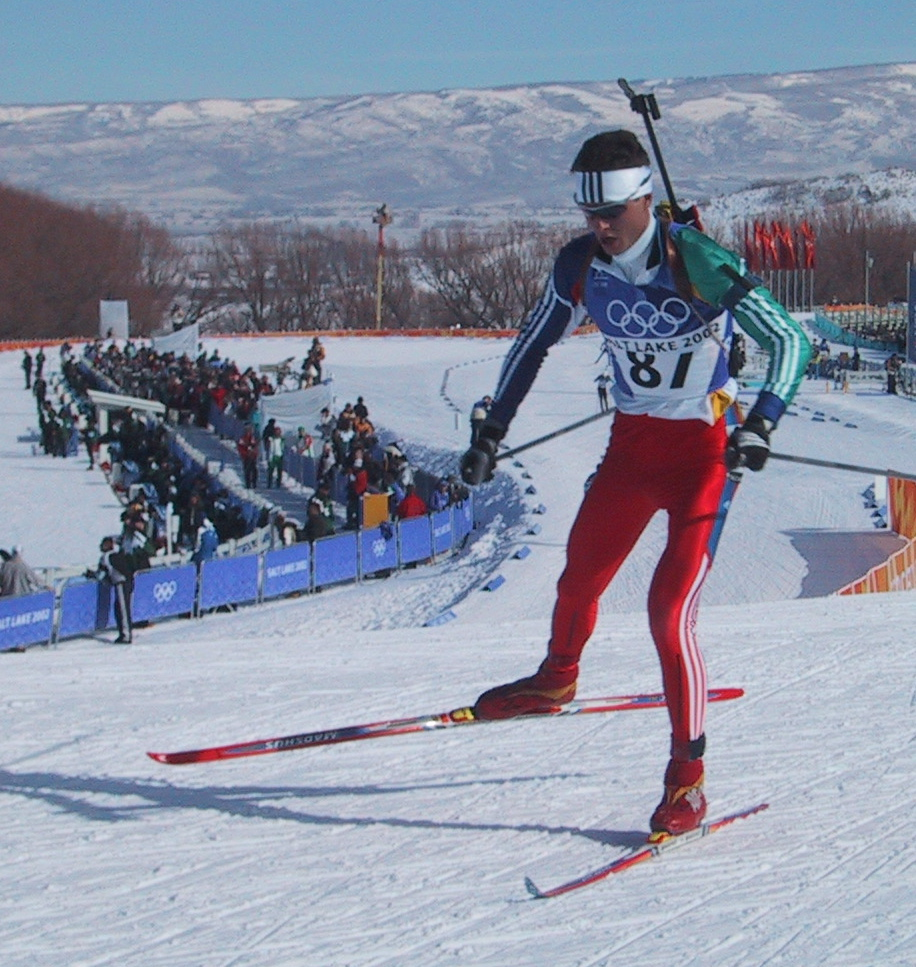
Frode Andresen competing at Soldier Hollow at the 2002 Winter Olympics.

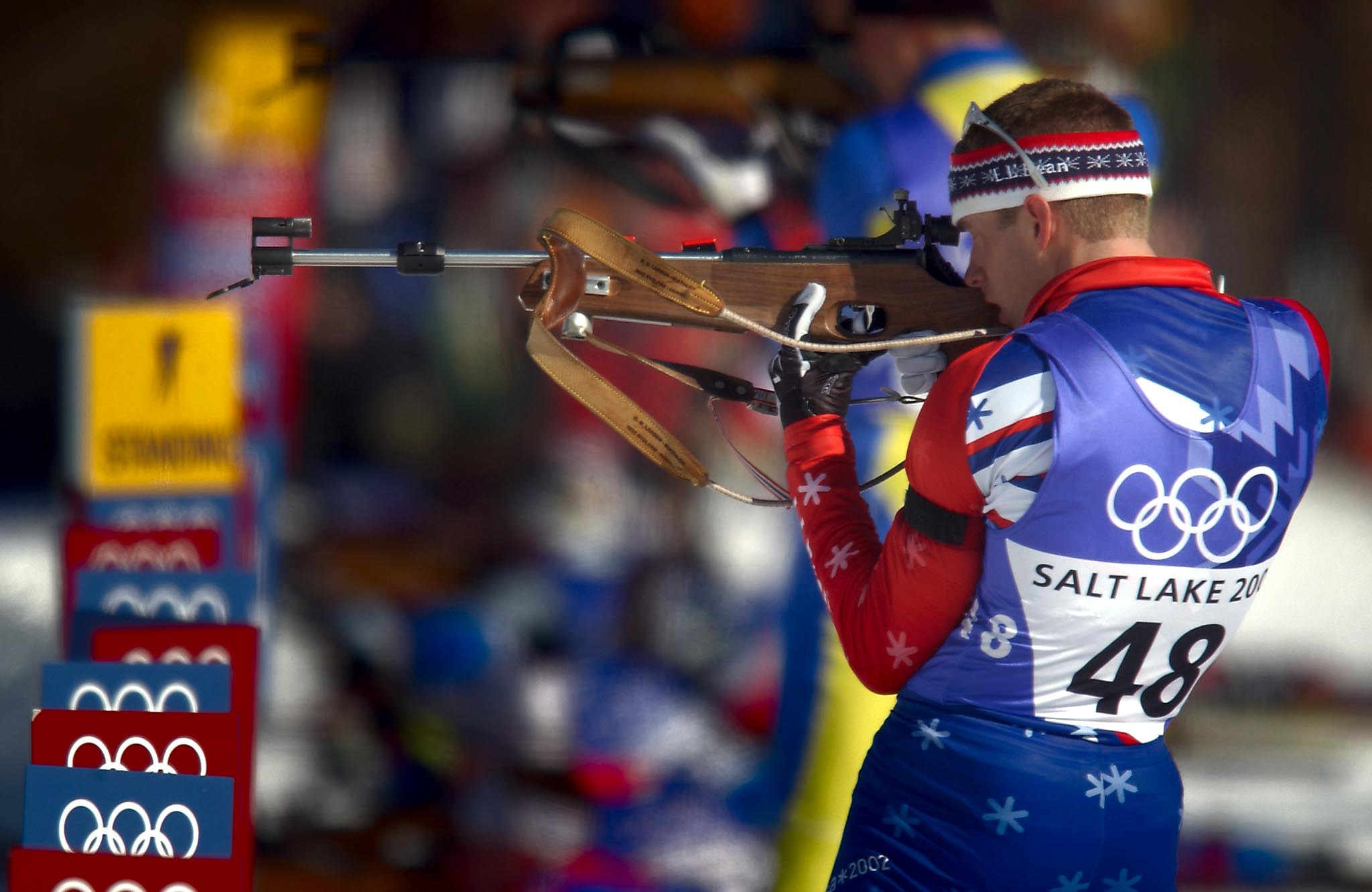
Jeremy Teela competing at Soldier Hollow at the 2002 Winter Olympics.

Biathlon at the 2002 Winter Olympics consisted of eight biathlon events. They were held at Soldier Hollow. The events began on 11 February and ended on 20 February 2002. For the first time since 1992, the biathlon program expanded. A new race type, the pursuit (for both men and women) was added, the first new race type since the debut of the sprint in 1980.

== Medal summary ==
Seven nations won medals in biathlon, with Germany winning the most (3 gold, 5 silver, 1 bronze), while Norway led the medal table with 4 gold medals. These four all involved Ole Einar Bjørndalen, who won each of the three men's individual events, as well as participating in the gold-medal winning relay team. Kati Wilhelm was the most successful athlete in the women's competition, taking two golds and a silver.

=== Medal table ===
Rank	Nation	Gold	Silver	Bronze	Total
1	Norway	4	2	0	6
2	Germany	3	5	1	9
3	Russia	1	0	2	3
4	France	0	1	1	2
5	Sweden	0	0	2	2
6	Austria	0	0	1	1
6	Bulgaria	0	0	1	1
Totals (7 entries)		8	8	8	24

=== Men's events ===
Event	Gold		Silver		Bronze	
Individual	Ole Einar Bjørndalen; Norway	51:03.3	Frank Luck; Germany	51:39.4	Viktor Maigourov; Russia	51:40.6
Sprint	Ole Einar Bjørndalen; Norway	24:51.3	Sven Fischer; Germany	25:20.2	Wolfgang Perner; Austria	25:44.4
Pursuit	Ole Einar Bjørndalen; Norway	32:34.6	Raphaël Poirée; France	33:17.6	Ricco Groß; Germany	33:30.6
Relay	Norway; Halvard Hanevold; Frode Andresen; Egil Gjelland; Ole Einar Bjørndalen	1:23:42.3	Germany; Ricco Groß; Peter Sendel; Sven Fischer; Frank Luck	1:24:27.6	France; Gilles Marguet; Vincent Defrasne; Julien Robert; Raphaël Poirée	1:24:36.6

=== Women's events ===
Event	Gold		Silver		Bronze	
Individual	Andrea Henkel; Germany	47:29.1	Liv Grete Skjelbreid-Poirée; Norway	47:37.0	Magdalena Forsberg; Sweden	48:08.3
Sprint	Kati Wilhelm; Germany	20:41.4	Uschi Disl; Germany	20:57.0	Magdalena Forsberg; Sweden	21:20.4
Pursuit	Olga Pyleva; Russia	31:07.7	Kati Wilhelm; Germany	31:13.0	Irina Nikulchina; Bulgaria	31:15.8
Relay	Germany; Katrin Apel; Uschi Disl; Andrea Henkel; Kati Wilhelm	1:27:55.0	Norway; Ann-Elen Skjelbreid; Linda Tjørhom; Gunn Margit Andreassen; Liv Grete Skjelbreid-Poirée	1:28:25.6	Russia; Olga Pyleva; Galina Kukleva; Svetlana Ishmouratova; Albina Akhatova	1:29:19.7

== Participating nations ==
Thirty-four nations sent biathletes to compete in the events. Below is a list of the competing nations; in parentheses are the number of national competitors. Chile and Croatia made their Olympic debuts in the sport, with one athlete each.

- Argentina (2)
- Austria (5)
- Belarus (11)
- Bulgaria (5)
- Canada (1)
- Chile (2)
- China (5)
- Croatia (1)
- Czech Republic (10)
- Estonia (4)
- Finland (9)
- France (10)
- Great Britain (4)
- Germany (11)
- Greece (2)
- Hungary (3)
- Italy (10)
- Japan (8)
- Kazakhstan (2)
- Kyrgyzstan (1)
- South Korea (2)
- Latvia (5)
- Lithuania (2)
- Moldova (2)
- Norway (9)
- Poland (5)
- Romania (4)
- Russia (11)
- Slovenia (10)
- Switzerland (4)
- Slovakia (6)
- Sweden (5)
- Ukraine (11)
- United States (8)

== See also ==
- Biathlon at the 2002 Winter Paralympics
