= Lukáš Heřmanský =

Czech Nordic combined skier

Personal information
- Nationality: Czech
- Born: 24 August 1980 (age 44); Myjava, Czechoslovakia

Sport
- Sport: Nordic combined

Lukáš Heřmanský (born 24 August 1980) is a Czech skier. He competed in the Nordic combined team event at the 2002 Winter Olympics.
