= France at the 2002 Winter Olympics =

- IOC code: FRA
- NOC: French National Olympic and Sports Committee
- Website: www.franceolympique.com (in French)

in Salt Lake City
- Competitors: 114 (87 men, 27 women) in 15 sports
- Flag bearer: Carole Montillet (alpine skiing)
- Medals Ranked 6th: Gold 4 Silver 5 Bronze 2 Total 11

Winter Olympics appearances (overview)
- 1924; 1928; 1932; 1936; 1948; 1952; 1956; 1960; 1964; 1968; 1972; 1976; 1980; 1984; 1988; 1992; 1994; 1998; 2002; 2006; 2010; 2014; 2018; 2022; 2026

France competed at the 2002 Winter Olympics in Salt Lake City, Utah.

== Medalists ==
Medal	Name	Sport	Event
Gold	Jean-Pierre Vidal	Alpine skiing	Men's slalom
Gold	Carole Montillet	Alpine skiing	Women's downhill
Gold	Marina Anissina; Gwendal Peizerat	Figure skating	Ice dancing
Gold	Isabelle Blanc	Snowboarding	Women's parallel giant slalom
Silver	Sébastien Amiez	Alpine skiing	Men's slalom
Silver	Laure Pequegnot	Alpine skiing	Women's slalom
Silver	Raphaël Poirée	Biathlon	Men's 12.5 km pursuit
Silver	Karine Ruby	Snowboarding	Women's parallel giant slalom
Silver	Doriane Vidal	Snowboarding	Women's halfpipe
Bronze	Vincent Defrasne; Gilles Marguet; Raphaël Poirée; Julien Robert	Biathlon	Men's 4 × 7.5 km relay
Bronze	Richard Gay	Freestyle skiing	Men's moguls

== Alpine skiing ==
Men

Athlete	Event	Race 1	Race 2	Total	
Athlete	Event	Time	Time	Time	Rank
Antoine Dénériaz	Downhill			1:40.74	12
Pierre-Emmanuel Dalcin	Downhill			1:40.58	11
Sébastien Fournier-Bidoz	Downhill			1:40.39	10
Claude Crétier	Downhill			1:39.96	5
Claude Crétier	Super-G			DNF	–
Christophe Saioni	Super-G			1:24.28	20
Sébastien Fournier-Bidoz	Super-G			1:23.82	15
Vincent Millet	Giant Slalom	1:14.03	DNF	DNF	–
Joël Chenal	Giant Slalom	1:13.76	1:13.32	2:27.08	21
Frédéric Covili	Giant Slalom	1:13.70	1:11.95	2:25.65	15
Pierrick Bourgeat	Slalom	50.54	DNF	DNF	–
Sébastien Amiez	Slalom	50.16	51.66	1:41.82	2nd place, silver medalist(s)
Jean-Pierre Vidal	Slalom	48.01	53.05	1:41.06	1st place, gold medalist(s)

Men's combined

Athlete	Downhill	Slalom		Total	
Athlete	Time	Time 1	Time 2	Total time	Rank
Antoine Dénériaz	1:41.91	51.82	58.24	3:31.97	21
Gaëtan Llorach	1:40.56	DNF	–	DNF	–

Women

Athlete	Event	Race 1	Race 2	Total	
Athlete	Event	Time	Time	Time	Rank
Ingrid Jacquemod	Downhill			1:42.70	23
Mélanie Suchet	Downhill			1:41.15	15
Carole Montillet-Carles	Downhill			1:39.56	1st place, gold medalist(s)
Ingrid Jacquemod	Super-G			1:16.17	22
Mélanie Suchet	Super-G			1:14.83	10
Carole Montillet-Carles	Super-G			1:14.28	7
Laure Pequegnot	Giant Slalom	1:19.99	1:19.26	2:39.25	33
Christel Pascal-Saioni	Giant Slalom	1:18.92	1:17.48	2:36.40	25
Carole Montillet-Carles	Giant Slalom	1:18.14	1:16.39	2:34.53	18
Christel Pascal-Saioni	Slalom	DNF	–	DNF	–
Vanessa Vidal	Slalom	53.70	54.41	1:48.11	7
Laure Pequegnot	Slalom	52.32	53.85	1:46.17	2nd place, silver medalist(s)

== Biathlon ==
Men

Event	Athlete	Misses ^{1}	Time	Rank
10 km sprint	Gilles Marguet	4	28:20.1	66
10 km sprint	Julien Robert	2	27:05.1	35
10 km sprint	Vincent Defrasne	2	26:36.7	21
10 km sprint	Raphaël Poirée	2	25:56.9	9
12.5 km pursuit ^{2}	Julien Robert	4	36:55.4	39
12.5 km pursuit ^{2}	Vincent Defrasne	3	34:33.6	18
12.5 km pursuit ^{2}	Raphaël Poirée	1	33:17.6	2nd place, silver medalist(s)

Event	Athlete	Time	Misses	Adjusted time ^{3}	Rank
20 km	Ferréol Cannard	56:32.9	5	1'01:32.9	77
20 km	Julien Robert	54:54.0	3	57:54.0	54
20 km	Vincent Defrasne	53:20.3	3	56:20.3	37
20 km	Raphaël Poirée	50:52.9	2	52:52.9	10

Men's 4 × 7.5 km relay

Athletes	Race		
Athletes	Misses ^{1}	Time	Rank
Gilles Marguet; Vincent Defrasne; Julien Robert; Raphaël Poirée	0	1'24:36.6	3rd place, bronze medalist(s)

Women

Event	Athlete	Misses ^{1}	Time	Rank
7.5 km sprint	Delphyne Heymann-Burlet	1	22:37.7	23
7.5 km sprint	Corinne Niogret	0	21:50.3	9
7.5 km sprint	Sandrine Bailly	1	21:35.7	7
7.5 km sprint	Florence Baverel-Robert	0	21:27.9	5
10 km pursuit ^{4}	Delphyne Heymann-Burlet	3	34:48.4	33
10 km pursuit ^{4}	Corinne Niogret	3	34:35.3	27
10 km pursuit ^{4}	Sandrine Bailly	4	32:57.2	17
10 km pursuit ^{4}	Florence Baverel-Robert	3	32:39.8	14

Event	Athlete	Time	Misses	Adjusted time ^{3}	Rank
15 km	Delphyne Heymann-Burlet	49:19.2	2	51:19.2	26
15 km	Corinne Niogret	49:49.6	1	50:49.6	21
15 km	Sylvie Becaert	48:09.0	2	50:09.0	16
15 km	Florence Baverel-Robert	47:10.2	2	49:10.2	11

Women's 4 × 7.5 km relay

Athletes	Race		
Athletes	Misses ^{1}	Time	Rank
Delphyne Heymann-Burlet; Florence Baverel-Robert; Sandrine Bailly; Corinne Niogret	0	1'31:09.3	9

^{1} A penalty loop of 150 metres had to be skied per missed target.
^{2} Starting delay based on 10 km sprint results.
^{3} One minute added per missed target.
^{4} Starting delay based on 7.5 km sprint results.

== Bobsleigh ==
Men

Sled	Athletes	Event	Run 1		Run 2		Run 3		Run 4		Total	
Sled	Athletes	Event	Time	Rank	Time	Rank	Time	Rank	Time	Rank	Time	Rank
FRA-1	Emmanuel Hostache; Bruno Mingeon	Two-man	48.23	17	48.03	10	48.27	17	48.15	12	3:12.68	13

Sled	Athletes	Event	Run 1		Run 2		Run 3		Run 4		Total	
Sled	Athletes	Event	Time	Rank	Time	Rank	Time	Rank	Time	Rank	Time	Rank
FRA-1	Bruno Mingeon; Éric Le Chanony; Christophe Fouquet; Alexandre Arbez	Four-man	46.92	8	46.86	7	47.25	5	47.53	5	3:08.56	5
FRA-2	Bruno Thomas; Michel André; Thibault Giroud; Philippe Paviot	Four-man	46.88	6	47.03	12	47.47	11	47.82	13	3:09.20	10

== Cross-country skiing ==
Men

Pursuit

Athlete	10 km C		10 km F pursuit^{1}	
Athlete	Time	Rank	Time	Final rank
Emmanuel Jonnier	29:21.2	60	did not advance	
Christophe Perrillat-Collomb	28:13.5	46 Q	28:11.9	56
Alexandre Rousselet	27:28.1	29 Q	25:33.9	35
Vincent Vittoz	27:05.2	21 Q	24:19.8	13

Event	Athlete	Race	
Event	Athlete	Time	Rank
30 km F	Christophe Perrillat-Collomb	DNF	–
30 km F	Alexandre Rousselet	1'18:01.3	47
30 km F	Vincent Vittoz	1'13:21.7	11
30 km F	Emmanuel Jonnier	1'13:15.1	10

^{1} Starting delay based on 10 km C. results.
C = Classical style, F = Freestyle

4 × 10 km relay

Athletes	Race	
Athletes	Time	Rank
Alexandre Rousselet; Christophe Perrillat-Collomb; Vincent Vittoz; Emmanuel Jonnier	1'35:50.8	8

Women

Pursuit

Athlete	5 km C		5 km F pursuit^{2}	
Athlete	Time	Rank	Time	Final rank
Annick Vaxelaire-Pierrel	14:18.6	40 Q	13:35.9	37
Karine Philippot	14:12.9	35 Q	13:12.8	19
Aurélie Perrillat-Collomb Storti	14:06.0	30 Q	13:29.7	31

Event	Athlete	Race	
Event	Athlete	Time	Rank
10 km C	Aurélie Perrillat-Collomb Storti	30:00.2	17
15 km F	Annick Vaxelaire-Pierrel	42:26.7	24
15 km F	Karine Philippot	40:38.6	8

^{2} Starting delay based on 5 km C. results.
C = Classical style, F = Freestyle

== Curling ==
=== Men's competition ===
==== Group stage ====
Top four teams advanced to semi-finals.

Country	Skip	W	L
Canada	Kevin Martin	8	1
Norway	Pål Trulsen	7	2
Switzerland	Andreas Schwaller	6	3
Sweden	Peja Lindholm	6	3
Finland	Markku Uusipaavalniemi	5	4
Germany	Sebastian Stock	4	5
Denmark	Ulrik Schmidt	3	6
(United Kingdom) Great Britain	Hammy McMillan	3	6
United States	Tim Somerville	3	6
France 10th	Dominique Dupont-Roc	0	9

Team 1	Score	Team 2
France	5–9	Germany
Denmark	8–7	France
France	2–9	Norway
Canada	8–1	France
Finland	6–5	France
France	3–8	United States
France	6–9	Sweden
France	3–7	Switzerland
France	3–7	United Kingdom

Contestants

France
Chamonix CC, Chamonix

Skip: Dominique Dupont-Roc
Third: Jan Ducroz
Second: Thomas Dufour
Lead: Spencer Mugnier
Alternate: Philippe Caux

== Figure skating ==
Men

Athlete	Points	SP	FS	Rank
Brian Joubert	20.5	17	12	14
Frédéric Dambier	16.5	11	11	11

Women

Athlete	Points	SP	FS	Rank
Vanessa Gusmeroli	22.0	10	17	16
Laëtitia Hubert	22.0	14	15	15

Ice Dancing

Athletes	Points	CD1	CD2	OD	FD	Rank
Isabelle Delobel; Olivier Schoenfelder	31.2	14	14	16	16	16
Marina Anissina; Gwendal Peizerat	2.0	1	1	1	1	1st place, gold medalist(s)

== Freestyle skiing ==
Men

Athlete	Event	Qualification			Final		
Athlete	Event	Time	Points	Rank	Time	Points	Rank
Laurent Niol	Moguls	29.94	24.46	16 Q	27.87	25.00	12
Cédric Regnier-Lafforgue	Moguls	30.05	24.87	13 Q	29.95	25.63	11
Johann Grégoire	Moguls	28.36	24.97	12 Q	28.06	22.77	14
Richard Gay	Moguls	29.42	25.86	5 Q	28.11	26.91	3rd place, bronze medalist(s)

Women

Athlete	Event	Qualification			Final		
Athlete	Event	Time	Points	Rank	Time	Points	Rank
Kathleen Allais	Moguls	39.48	20.54	24	did not advance		
Sandra Laoura	Moguls	37.13	23.54	7 Q	34.82	24.12	8

== Ice hockey ==
=== Men's tournament ===
==== Preliminary round - Group B ====
Top team (shaded) advanced to the first round.

Team	GP	W	L	T	GF	GA	GD	Pts
Belarus	3	2	1	0	5	3	+2	4
Ukraine	3	2	1	0	9	5	+4	4
Switzerland	3	1	1	1	7	9	−2	3
France	3	0	2	1	6	10	−4	1

All times are local (UTC-7).

9 February 2002; 21:00	Switzerland	3 – 3 (1–1, 0–1, 2–1)	France	E Center, West Valley City; Attendance: 8,504

11 February 2002; 19:00	Belarus	3 – 1 (1–1, 1–0, 1–0)	France	Peaks Ice Arena, Provo; Attendance: 6,214

12 February 2002; 19:00	France	2 – 4 (0–2, 2–2, 0–0)	Ukraine	Peaks Ice Arena, Provo; Attendance: 6,019

==== Consolation round ====
13th place match

14 February 2002; 21:00	Slovakia	7 – 1 (1–0, 2–0, 4–1)	France 14th	Peaks Ice Arena, Provo; Attendance: 5,956

- Team roster
  - Cristobal Huet
  - Fabrice Lhenry
  - Patrick Rolland
  - Allan Carriou
  - Vincent Bachet
  - Karl Dewolf
  - Jean-François Bonnard
  - Denis Perez
  - Benoit Pourtanel
  - Baptiste Amar
  - Benoit Bachelet
  - Stéphane Barin
  - Arnaud Briand
  - Maurice Rozenthal
  - Laurent Meunier
  - Francis Rozenthal
  - Philippe Bozon
  - Yorick Treille
  - Guillaume Besse
  - Jonathan Zwikel
  - Anthony Mortas
  - Richard Aimonetto
  - Laurent Gras
- Head coach: Heikki Leime

== Luge ==
Men

Athlete	Run 1		Run 2		Run 3		Run 4		Total	
Athlete	Time	Rank	Time	Rank	Time	Rank	Time	Rank	Time	Rank
Yann Fricheteau	45.240	21	45.009	12	44.869	20	45.060	13	3:00.178	18
Johan Rousseau	44.999	13	45.025	14	44.766	16	45.243	21	3:00.033	15

Women

Athlete	Run 1		Run 2		Run 3		Run 4		Total	
Athlete	Time	Rank	Time	Rank	Time	Rank	Time	Rank	Time	Rank
Mélanie Ougier	44.228	21	44.055	21	44.161	25	44.043	22	2:56.487	24

== Nordic combined ==
Men's sprint

Events:

- large hill ski jumping
- 7.5 km cross-country skiing (Start delay, based on ski jumping results.)

Athlete	Ski Jumping		Cross-country time	Total rank
Athlete	Points	Rank	Cross-country time	Total rank
Frédéric Baud	93.1	35	18:33.5	27
Nicolas Bal	96.5	32	18:04.8	18
Kevin Arnould	101.1	24	19:00.9	34
Ludovic Roux	103.5	20	17:45.7	10

Men's individual

Events:

- normal hill ski jumping
- 15 km cross-country skiing (Start delay, based on ski jumping results.)

Athlete	Ski Jumping		Cross-country time	Total rank
Athlete	Points	Rank	Cross-country time	Total rank
Ludovic Roux	202.0	37	44:22.3	26
Frédéric Baud	206.0	36	45:35.9	37
Nicolas Bal	216.5	27	41:43.3	10
Kevin Arnould	236.5	9	43:12.1	17

Men's Team

Four participants per team.

Events:

- normal hill ski jumping
- 5 km cross-country skiing (Start delay, based on ski jumping results.)

Athletes	Ski jumping		Cross-country time	Total rank
Athletes	Points	Rank	Cross-country time	Total rank
Ludovic Roux; Frédéric Baud; Nicolas Bal; Kevin Arnould	846.5	8	51:35.5	6

== Short track speed skating ==
Men

Athlete	Event	Round one		Quarter finals		Semi finals		Finals	
Athlete	Event	Time	Rank	Time	Rank	Time	Rank	Time	Final rank
Bruno Loscos	500 m	43.864	2 Q	1:39.879	4	did not advance			
Ludovic Mathieu	500 m	43.790	3 ADV	1:13.328	4	did not advance			
Gregory Durand	1000 m	DSQ	–	did not advance					
Bruno Loscos	1000 m	1:28.532	3	did not advance					
Bruno Loscos	1500 m	2:23.517	2 Q			2:15.981	2 QF	2:19.587	5
Gregory Durand	1500 m	2:20.496	3 Q			2:49.994	5	did not advance	

Women

Athlete	Event	Round one		Quarter finals		Semi finals		Finals	
Athlete	Event	Time	Rank	Time	Rank	Time	Rank	Time	Final rank
Stéphanie Bouvier	500 m	45.723	3	did not advance					
Stéphanie Bouvier	1000 m	1:37.684	2 Q	1:35.409	3	did not advance			
Stéphanie Bouvier	1500 m	2:30.075	2 Q			2:31.570	3 QB	2:32.673	11

== Skeleton ==
Men

Athlete	Run 1		Run 2		Total	
Athlete	Time	Rank	Time	Rank	Time	Rank
Philippe Cavoret	51.92	14	51.96	17	1:43.88	17

== Ski jumping ==
Athlete	Event	Qualifying jump			Final jump 1			Final jump 2		Total	
Athlete	Event	Distance	Points	Rank	Distance	Points	Rank	Distance	Points	Points	Rank
Nicolas Dessum	Normal hill	91.5	117.5	7 Q	90.0	114.0	24 Q	91.5	117.5	231.5	22
Florentin Durand	Large hill	96.5	66.7	44	did not advance						
Rémi Santiago	Large hill	105.0	84.0	33 Q	117.0	106.1	33	did not advance			
Emmanuel Chedal	Large hill	111.0	97.3	21 Q	118.5	111.3	24 Q	109.5	93.6	204.9	28
Nicolas Dessum	Large hill	115.5	104.4	10 Q	118.5	110.3	27 Q	118.5	109.8	220.1	23

Men's team large hill

Athletes	Result	
Athletes	Points ^{1}	Rank
Emmanuel Chedal; Rémi Santiago; Florentin Durand; Nicolas Dessum	755.1	10

^{1} Four teams members performed two jumps each.

== Snowboarding ==
Men's parallel giant slalom

Athlete	Qualifying		Round one	Quarter final	Semi final	Final	Rank
Athlete	Time	Rank	Round one	Quarter final	Semi final	Final	Rank
Charlie Cosnier	38.41	23	did not advance				
Christophe Ségura	38.06	21	did not advance				
Nicolas Huet	37.49	16 Q	(Switzerland) Nicolas Het W	(Austria) Sigi Grabner W	(Sweden) Richard Richardsson L (DSQ)	(United States) Chris Klug L	4
Mathieu Bozzetto	36.90	7 Q	(Austria) Dieter Krassnig W	(Switzerland) Philipp Schoch L	did not advance		6

Men's halfpipe

Athlete	Qualifying round 1		Qualifying round 2		Final	
Athlete	Points	Rank	Points	Rank	Points	Rank
Sébastien Vassoney	13.5	32	32.1	15	did not advance	
Mathieu Justafre	16.0	30	12.2	27	did not advance	
Jonathan Collomb-Patton	23.9	22	28.5	22	did not advance	

Women's parallel giant slalom

Athlete	Qualifying		Round one	Quarter final	Semi final	Final	Rank
Athlete	Time	Rank	Round one	Quarter final	Semi final	Final	Rank
Florine Valdenaire	44.96	25	did not advance				
Julie Pomagalski	42.25	5 Q	(Italy) Marion Posch W	(France) Isabelle Blanc L	did not advance		6
Isabelle Blanc	42.20	4 Q	(Switzerland) Steffi von Siebenthal W	(France) Julie Pomagalski W	(Poland) Jagna Marczułajtis W	(France) Karine Ruby W	1st place, gold medalist(s)
Karine Ruby	41.45	2 Q	(Russia) Mariya Tikhvinskaya W	(United States) Lisa Kosglow W	(Italy) Lidia Trettel W	(France) Isabelle Blanc L	2nd place, silver medalist(s)

Women's halfpipe

Athlete	Qualifying round 1		Qualifying round 2		Final	
Athlete	Points	Rank	Points	Rank	Points	Rank
Doriane Vidal	38.3	3 QF			43.0	2nd place, silver medalist(s)

== Speed skating ==
Men

Event	Athlete	Race	
Event	Athlete	Time	Rank
1000 m	Cédric Kuentz	1:11.26	38
1500 m	Cédric Kuentz	1:48.20	29
5000 m	Cédric Kuentz	6:35.05	24
