= Selina Heregger =

Austrian alpine skier (born 1977)

Selina Heregger (born 29 April 1977 in Lienz) is an Austrian former alpine skier who competed in the 2002 Winter Olympics.
