= Andreas Günter =

German Nordic combined skier (born 1988)

Andreas Günter (born 1988) is a retired German Nordic combined skier.

At the 2008 Junior World Championships he won a gold medal in the team competition and recorded 5th and 6th places individually. He made his Continental Cup debut in January 2009 in Eisenerz and won his first race a week later in Klingenthal. Competing fairly often on the Continental Cup circuit until 2013, he finished on the podium twelve times in individual competition.

He made his World Cup debut in January 2008 in Seefeld in Tirol, finishing 36th. He collected his first World Cup points in March 2008 in Holmenkollen, recording 26th and 20th-place finishes. He improved further to 17th in February 2009 in Seefeld. Managing to finish 20th on three more occasions, he never broke the top 15, and his last World Cup outing came in January 2013 in Klingenthal.

He represented the sports club SV Baiersbronn.
