= Alexey Fadeyev =

Russian Nordic combined skier

Medal record

Men's Nordic combined

World Championships
Bronze medal – third place	1999 Ramsau	4 x 5 km team

Alexey Fadeyev (Russian: Алексей Фадеев); born 10 December 1977) is a Russian Nordic combined athlete who competed from 1998 to 2002. He won a bronze medal in the 4 x 5 km team event at the 1999 FIS Nordic World Ski Championships in Ramsau and finished 8th in the 15 km individual at those same championships.

Fadeyev finished 31st in the 15 km individual event at the 2002 Winter Olympics in Salt Lake City. His best individual career finish was 2nd in a 7.5 km sprint event in Planica, Slovenia in 2001.
