= Vladimir Lysenin =

Russian Nordic combined skier

Personal information
- Nationality: Russian
- Born: 24 January 1978 (age 47); Moscow, Russia

Sport
- Sport: Nordic combined

Vladimir Lysenin (born 24 January 1978) is a Russian skier. He competed in the Nordic combined events at the 1998 Winter Olympics and the 2002 Winter Olympics.
