= Sergey Zakharenko =

Belarusian Nordic combined skier

Personal information
- Nationality: Belarusian
- Born: 19 September 1974 (age 50); Mogilev, Byelorussian SSR, Soviet Union

Sport
- Sport: Nordic combined

Sergey Zakharenko (born 19 September 1974) is a Belarusian skier. He competed in the Nordic combined events at the 1994 Winter Olympics, the 1998 Winter Olympics and the 2002 Winter Olympics.
