= Mikko Keskinarkaus =

Finnish Nordic combined skier

Personal information
- Nationality: Finnish
- Born: 29 June 1979 (age 45); Rovaniemi, Finland

Sport
- Sport: Nordic combined

Mikko Keskinarkaus (born 29 June 1979) is a Finnish skier. He competed in the Nordic combined event at the 2002 Winter Olympics.
