= Michal Pšenko =

Slovak Nordic combined skier

Personal information
- Nationality: Slovak
- Born: 8 July 1982 (age 42); Poprad, Czechoslovakia

Sport
- Sport: Nordic combined

Michal Pšenko (born 8 July 1982) is a Slovak skier. He competed in the Nordic combined event at the 2002 Winter Olympics.
