= Lars Andreas Østvik =

Norwegian Nordic combined skier

Lars Andreas Østvik (born 18 August 1977) is a Norwegian Nordic combined skier who competed from 1998 to 2004. He finished fifth in the 4 x 5 km team event at the 2002 Winter Olympics in Salt Lake City.

Østvik finished 29th in the 15 km individual event at the 2001 FIS Nordic World Ski Championships in Lahti. His best World Cup finish was third in a 15 km individual event in Italy in 2000.

Østvik earned four career victories, all in World Cup B events from 1998 to 2003.
