= Aleksey Tsvetkov =

Russian Nordic combined skier

Personal information
- Nationality: Russian
- Born: 1 September 1981 (age 43); Yekaterinburg, Russia

Sport
- Sport: Nordic combined

Aleksey Tsvetkov (born 1 September 1981) is a Russian skier. He competed in the Nordic combined event at the 2002 Winter Olympics.
