= Andreas Hartmann =

Swiss Nordic combined skier

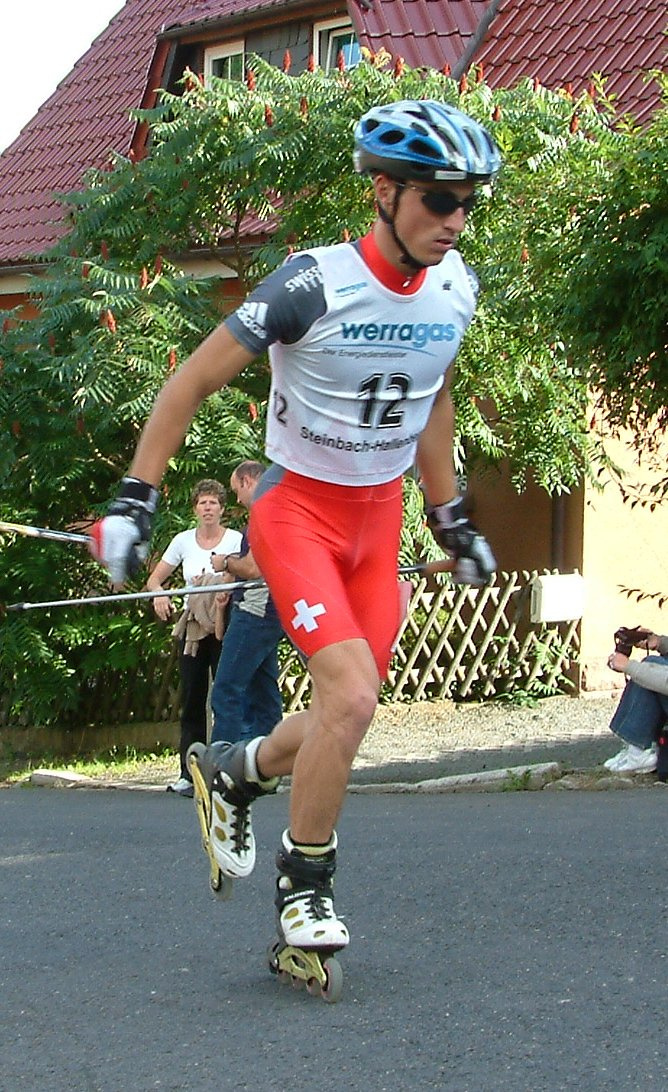
Andy hartmann

Andreas Hartmann (born 29 January 1980) was a Swiss Nordic combined skier who competed from 1997 to 2006. Competing in two Winter Olympics, he had his best overall finish of seventh in the 4 x 5 km team event at Nagano in 1998 and eighth in the 7.5 km sprint event at Salt Lake City in 2002.

Hartmann's best finish at the FIS Nordic World Ski Championships was 24th in the 15 km individual event at Lahti in 2001. His best World Cup finish was third in a 15 km individual event in Norway in 1997.

Hartmann's best individual career finish was second on five occasions at various levels and distances from 1997 to 2003.
