= Matt Dayton =

American Nordic combined skier

Matt Dayton (born August 24, 1977) is an American Nordic combined skier who competed from 1999 to 2002. At the 2002 Winter Olympics in Salt Lake City, he finished fourth in the 4 x 5 km team event and 18th in the 15 km individual event.

Dayton's best finish at the FIS Nordic World Ski Championships was 27th in the 7.5 km sprint event at Lahti in 2001. His best World Cup finish was fifth in a 7.5 km sprint event in the United States in 2001.

Dayton's only career victory came in a World Cup B 7.5 km sprint event in the United States in 2000.
