= Petr Šmejc =

Czech Nordic combined skier

Personal information
- Nationality: Czech
- Born: 7 March 1978 (age 47); Jilemnice, Czechoslovakia

Sport
- Sport: Nordic combined

Petr Šmejc (born 7 March 1978) is a Czech skier. He competed in the Nordic combined events at the 1998 Winter Olympics and the 2002 Winter Olympics.
