= Satoshi Mori (skier) =

Japanese Nordic combined skier

Satoshi Mori (born May 19, 1971) is a Japanese former Nordic combined skier who competed from 1994 to 2003. Competing in two Winter Olympics, he had his best overall finish of fifth in the 4 x 5 km team event at Nagano in 1998 and his best individual finish of 22nd in the 7.5 km sprint event at Salt Lake City in 2002.

Mori's best finish at the FIS Nordic World Ski Championships was sixth in the 7.5 km sprint event at Ramsau in 1999. His best World Cup finish was second in a 15 km individual event in Poland in 1999, which was one of his three best career finishes. Mori also earned two second-place finishes in World Cup B 15 km individual events (1994, 1997).
