= Pavel Churavý =

Czech Nordic combined skier

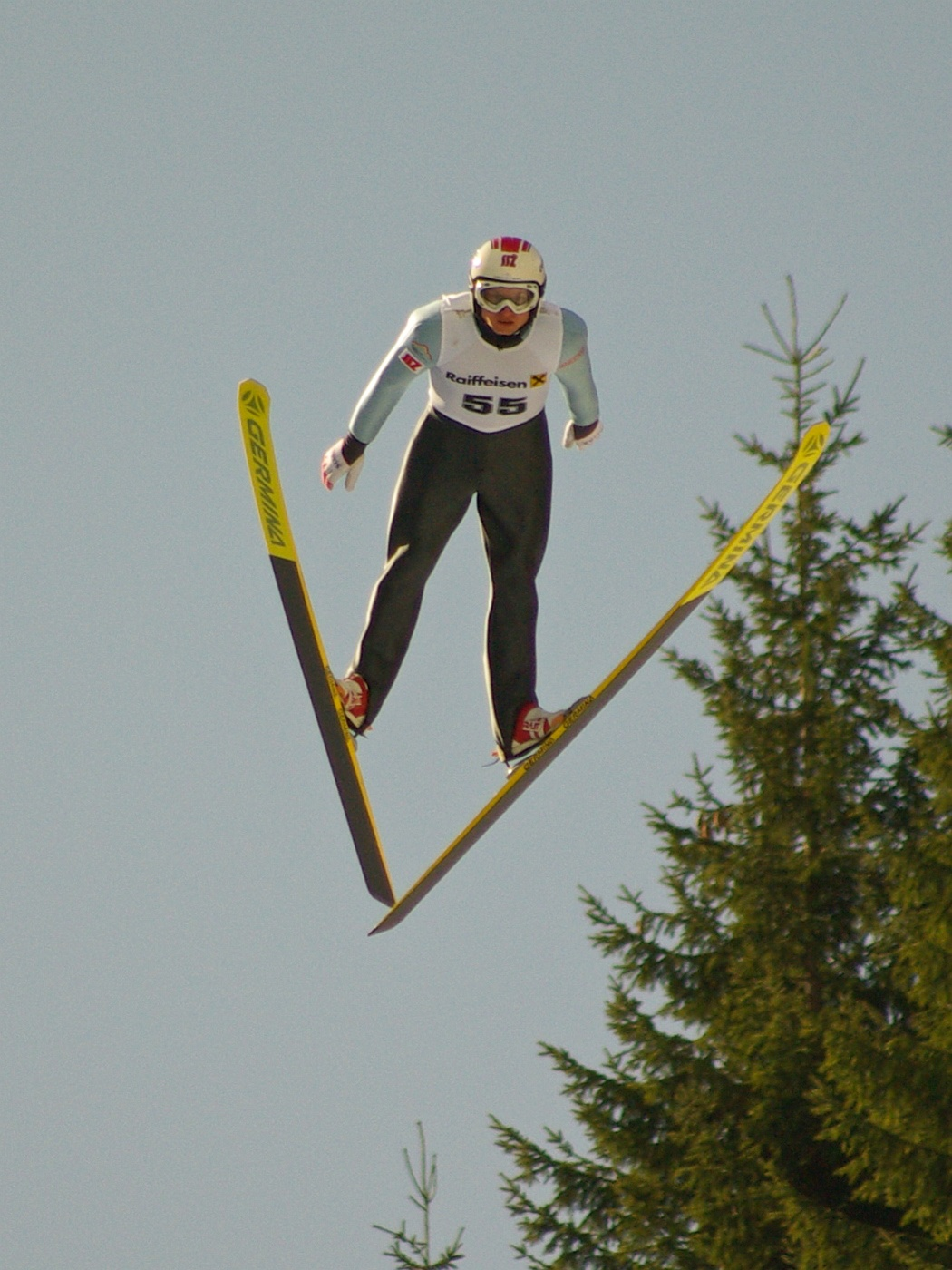
- Churavý in March 2008

Personal information
- Born: 22 April 1977 (age 48) Liberec, Czechoslovakia
- Height: 179 cm (5 ft 10 in)
- Weight: 69 kg (152 lb)

Sport
- Sport: Skiing

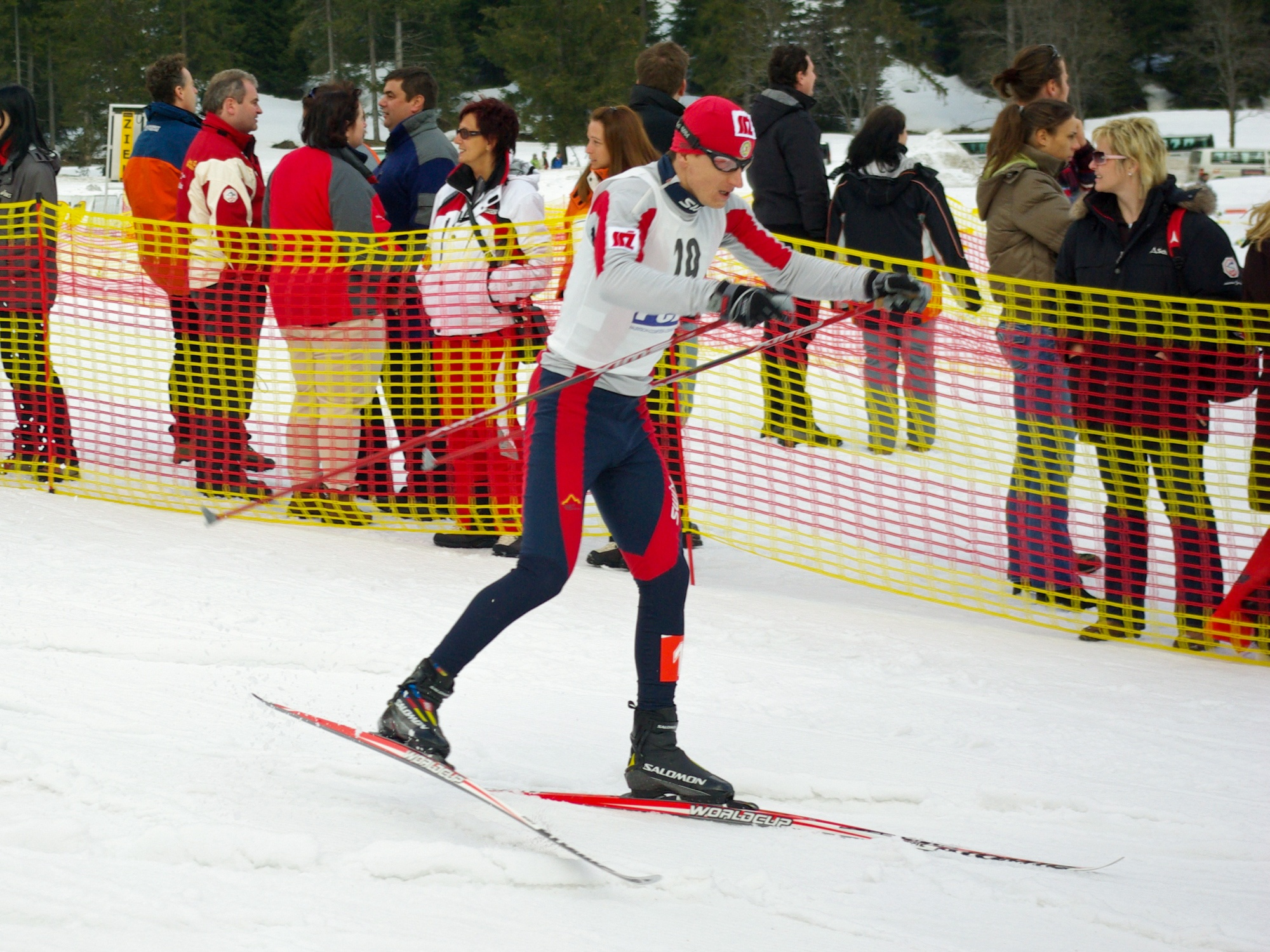
Pavel Churavý in March 2008

Pavel Churavý (Czech pronunciation: [ˈpavɛl ˈxuraviː]; born 22 April 1977) is a Czech Nordic combined skier who has competed since 1999.

== Career ==
Competing in three Winter Olympics, he earned his best finish of fifth in the 10 km individual large hill event at Vancouver in 2010.

Churavý's best finish at the FIS Nordic World Ski Championships was sixth in the 4 × 5 km team event at Liberec in 2009 while his best individual finish was eighth in the 10 km individual large hill event at those same championships.

His best World Cup finishes were second twice, earning them in 2002 and 2010.
