= Gen Tomii =

Japanese Nordic combined skier (born 1973)

Gen Tomii (富井 彦, Tomii Gen; born May 30, 1973) is a Japanese Nordic combined skier who competed from 1998 to 2004. Competing in two Winter Olympics, he had his best overall finish of fifth in the 4 x 5 km team event at Nagano in 1998 and his best individual finish of 33rd in the 15 km individual event at Salt Lake City in 2002.

Tomii's best finish at the FIS Nordic World Ski Championships was 27th in the 7.5 km sprint event at Ramsau in 1999. His best World Cup finish was fifth in a 7.5 km sprint event in Finland in 1998.

Tomii's best individual career finish was third on five occasions in World Cup B events from 1998 to 2003.
