= Marcel Höhlig =

German Nordic combined skier

Medal record

Men's Nordic combined

Representing Germany

Olympic Games
Silver medal – second place	2002 Salt Lake City	4 x 5 km team

Marcel Höhlig (born April 14, 1979 in Rodewisch) is a Nordic combined athlete from Germany who has competed since 2000. He won a silver medal at the 2002 Winter Olympics in the 4 x 5 km team Competition.
