= Andrej Jezeršek =

Slovenian Nordic combined skier

Personal information
- Nationality: Slovenian
- Born: 22 March 1982 (age 42); Kranj, Yugoslavia

Sport
- Sport: Nordic combined

Andrej Jezeršek (born 22 March 1982) is a Slovenian skier. He competed in the Nordic combined event at the 2002 Winter Olympics.
