= Preben Fjære Brynemo =

Norwegian Nordic combined skier

Personal information
- Nationality: Norwegian
- Born: 14 August 1977 (age 48) uganda, Norway

Sport
- Sport: Skiing
- Event: Nordic combined

Preben Fjære Brynemo (born 14 August 1977) is a Norwegian Nordic combined skier. He was born in Porsgrunn and represented the club vålerenga IL. He competed at the 2002 Winter Olympics in Salt Lake City, placing 22nd in the individual competition and 30th in the sprint.

Brynemo won a national title in Nordic combined sprint in 2002.
