= Jan Rune Grave =

Norwegian Nordic combined skier (born 1977)

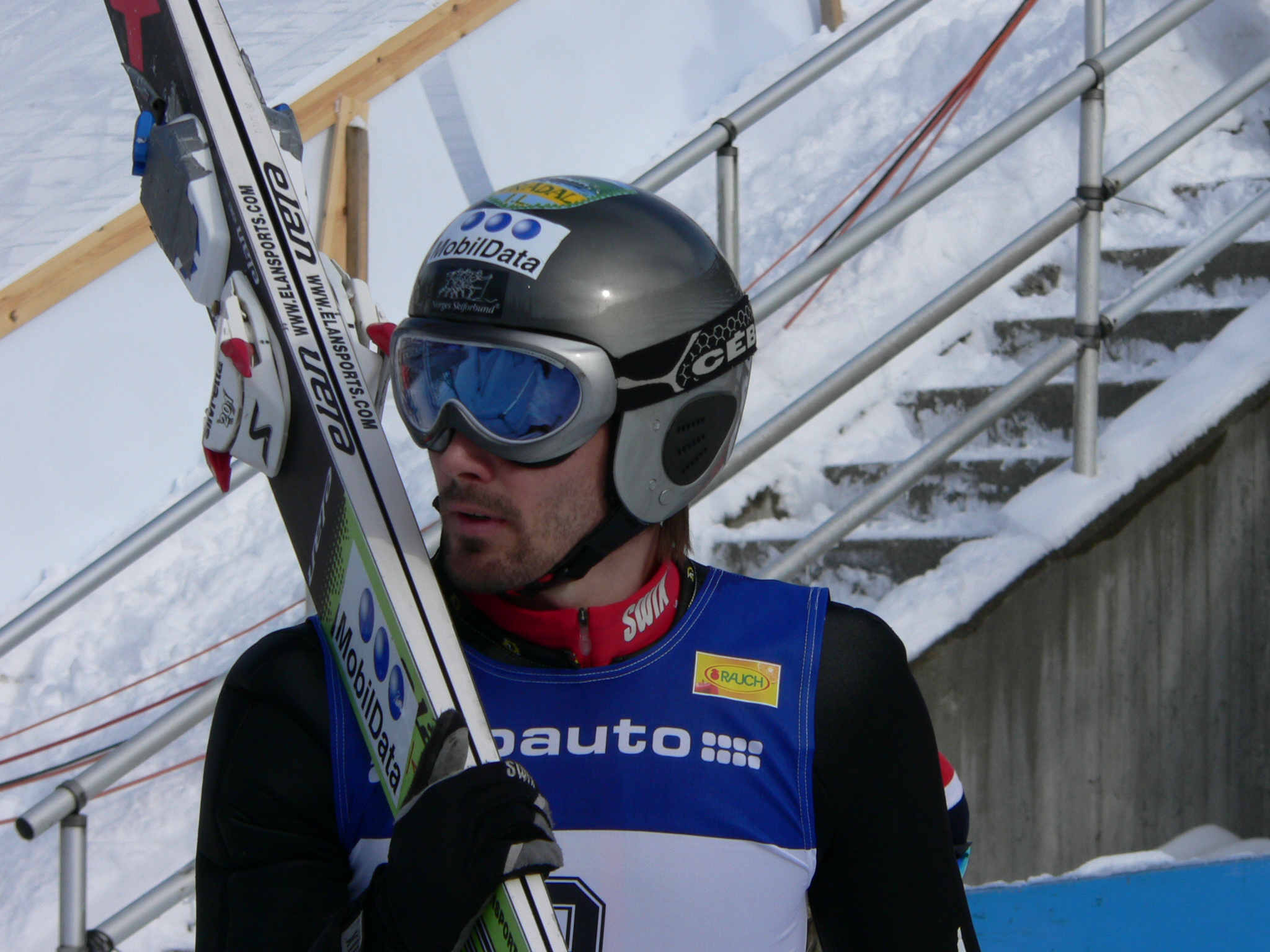
Jan Rune Grave in 2005

Jan Rune Grave (born May 8, 1977) is a Norwegian Nordic combined skier who competed from 1998 to 2006. At the 2002 Winter Olympics in Salt Lake City, he finished fifth in the 4 x 5 km team event and 24th in the 15 km individual event.

Grave's best World Cup finish was seventh in a 15 km individual event in Germany in 2002. His only victory was in a World Cup B 7.5 km sprint event in Finland in 2001.
