= Kevin Arnould =

French Nordic combined skier

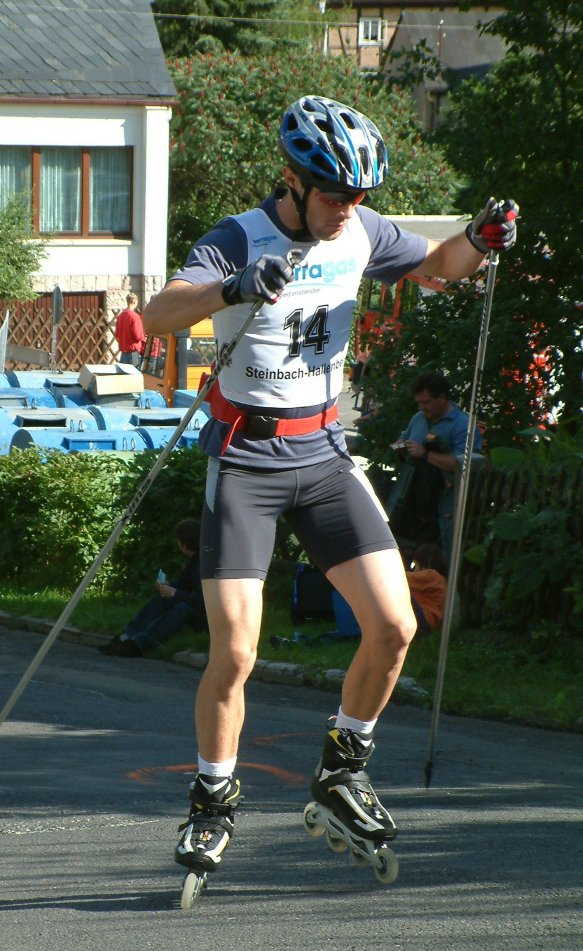
Kevin Arnould

Kevin Arnould (born February 19, 1980, in Sallanches) is a French Nordic combined skier who competed from 2000 to 2006. At the 2002 Winter Olympics in Salt Lake City, he finished sixth in the 4 x 5 km team event and 17th in the 15 km individual event.

Arnould's best finish at the FIS Nordic World Ski Championships was ninth in the 7.5 km sprint event at Val di Fiemme in 2003. His best World Cup finish was fifth in a 7.5 km sprint event in Norway in 2003.

Arnould earned three individual career victories from 2000 to 2005, all in World Cup B events.
