= Frédéric Baud =

French Nordic combined skier

Frédéric Baud (born February 5, 1975) was a French Nordic combined skier who competed from 1993 to 2004. At the 2002 Winter Olympics in Salt Lake City, he finished sixth in the 4 x 5 km team event and 27th in the 7.5 km sprint event.

Baud's best finish at the FIS Nordic World Ski Championships was 13th in the 15 km individual event at Ramsau in 1999. His best World Cup finish was sixth in a 15 km individual event in France in 2003.

Baud has ten career victories, all in World Cup B events, from 1997 to 2003.
