= Sverre Rotevatn =

Norwegian Nordic combined skier

Medal record

Men's Nordic combined

World Championships
Gold medal – first place	2001 Lahti	4 x 5 km team

Sverre Rotevatn (born 17 January 1977 in Lillehammer) is a former Norwegian Nordic combined who competed from 1998 to 2004. He won a gold medal in the 4 x 5 km team event at the 2001 FIS Nordic World Ski Championships in Lahti and finished 27th in the 15 km individual event at those same championships.

Rotevatn's best individual finish at the Winter Olympics was 7th in the 7.5 km sprint event at Salt Lake City in 2002. His best individual career finish was 2nd on five occasions from 1998 to 2003.
