= Japan at the 1998 Winter Olympics =

- IOC code: JPN
- NOC: Japanese Olympic Committee
- Website: www.joc.or.jp (in Japanese and English)

in Nagano
- Competitors: 156 (92 men, 64 women) in 14 sports
- Flag bearer: Hiroyasu Shimizu (speed skating)
- Medals Ranked 7th: Gold 5 Silver 1 Bronze 4 Total 10

Winter Olympics appearances (overview)
- 1928; 1932; 1936; 1948; 1952; 1956; 1960; 1964; 1968; 1972; 1976; 1980; 1984; 1988; 1992; 1994; 1998; 2002; 2006; 2010; 2014; 2018; 2022; 2026

Japan was the host nation for the 1998 Winter Olympics in Nagano. It was the second time that Japan has hosted the Winter Games, after the 1972 Winter Olympics in Sapporo, and the third time overall, after the 1964 Summer Olympics in Tokyo.

== Medalists ==
Medal	Name	Sport	Event	Date
Gold	Hiroyasu Shimizu	Speed skating	Men's 500 m	10 February
Gold	Tae Satoya	Freestyle skiing	Women's moguls	11 February
Gold	Kazuyoshi Funaki	Ski jumping	Men's large hill individual	15 February
Gold	Takanobu Okabe; Hiroya Saito; Masahiko Harada; Kazuyoshi Funaki	Ski jumping	Men's large hill team	17 February
Gold	Takafumi Nishitani	Short track speed skating	Men's 500 m	21 February
Silver	Kazuyoshi Funaki	Ski jumping	Men's normal hill individual	11 February
Bronze	Tomomi Okazaki	Speed skating	Women's 500 m	14 February
Bronze	Hiroyasu Shimizu	Speed skating	Men's 1000 m	15 February
Bronze	Masahiko Harada	Ski jumping	Men's large hill individual	15 February
Bronze	Hitoshi Uematsu	Short track speed skating	Men's 500 m	21 February

Medals by sport
Sport	1st place, gold medalist(s)	2nd place, silver medalist(s)	3rd place, bronze medalist(s)	Total
Ski jumping	2	1	1	4
Speed skating	1	0	2	3
Short track speed skating	1	0	1	2
Freestyle skiing	1	0	0	1
Total	5	1	4	10

== Competitors ==
The following is the list of number of competitors in the Games.

Sport	Men	Women	Total
Alpine skiing	6	4	10
Biathlon	4	4	8
Bobsleigh	9	–	9
Cross-country skiing	5	6	11
Curling	5	5	10
Figure skating	4	3	7
Freestyle skiing	5	2	7
Ice hockey	22	20	42
Luge	3	3	6
Nordic combined	5	–	5
Short track speed skating	6	5	11
Ski jumping	5	–	5
Snowboarding	4	3	7
Speed skating	9	9	18
Total	92	64	156

== Alpine skiing ==
Men

Athlete	Event	Race 1	Race 2	Total	
Athlete	Event	Time	Time	Time	Rank
Yasuyuki Takishita	Downhill			DNF	–
Tsuyoshi Tomii	Downhill			1:52.62	17
Yasuyuki Takishita	Super-G			1:38.39	27
Tsuyoshi Tomii	Super-G			1:37.86	24
Kentaro Minagawa	Giant slalom	DNF	–	DNF	–
Takuya Ishioka	Giant slalom	1:26.16	1:23.35	2:49.51	29
Kiminobu Kimura	Giant slalom	1:25.02	1:21.33	2:46.35	25
Kentaro Minagawa	Slalom	DNF	–	DNF	–
Takuya Ishioka	Slalom	58.85	56.84	1:55.69	21
Gaku Hirasawa	Slalom	57.74	57.50	1:55.24	20
Kiminobu Kimura	Slalom	56.53	55.62	1:52.15	13

Men's combined

Athlete	Slalom		Downhill	Total	
Athlete	Time 1	Time 2	Time	Total time	Rank
Yasuyuki Takishita	DNF	–	–	DNF	–

Women

Athlete	Event	Race 1	Race 2	Total	
Athlete	Event	Time	Time	Time	Rank
Kumiko Kashiwagi	Super-G			1:21.89	36
Noriyo Hiroi	Giant slalom	DNF	–	DNF	–
Kumiko Kashiwagi	Giant slalom	1:26.33	1:35.58	3:01.91	27
Junko Yamakawa	Giant slalom	1:24.93	1:39.02	3:03.95	29
Kazuko Ikeda	Giant slalom	1:23.06	1:37.65	3:00.71	25
Noriyo Hiroi	Slalom	DSQ	–	DSQ	–
Kumiko Kashiwagi	Slalom	49.63	50.83	1:40.46	24
Junko Yamakawa	Slalom	48.76	49.34	1:38.10	20
Kazuko Ikeda	Slalom	47.88	49.41	1:37.29	17

Women's combined

Athlete	Downhill	Slalom		Total	
Athlete	Time	Time 1	Time 2	Total time	Rank
Junko Yamakawa	1:34.98	38.24	37.14	2:50.36	16

== Biathlon ==
Men

Event	Athlete	Misses ^{1}	Time	Rank
10 km Sprint	Atsushi Kazama	6	31:41.2	61
10 km Sprint	Shuichi Sekiya	3	30:33.4	43
10 km Sprint	Kyoji Suga	2	29:19.4	18

Event	Athlete	Time	Misses	Adjusted time ^{2}	Rank
20 km	Atsushi Kazama	58:23.5	4	1'02:23.5	45
20 km	Hironao Meguro	58:38.2	2	1'00:38.2	28
20 km	Kyoji Suga	57:15.6	2	59:15.6	14

Men's 4 × 7.5 km relay

Athletes	Race		
Athletes	Misses ^{1}	Time	Rank
Kyoji Suga; Hironao Meguro; Shuichi Sekiya; Atsushi Kazama	4	1'27:55.7	15

Women

Event	Athlete	Misses ^{1}	Time	Rank
7.5 km Sprint	Mie Takeda	6	28:10.1	61
7.5 km Sprint	Ryoko Takahashi	5	26:34.2	55
7.5 km Sprint	Hiromi Seino-Suga	4	26:13.5	53

Event	Athlete	Time	Misses	Adjusted time ^{2}	Rank
15 km	Hiromi Seino-Suga	54:21.9	7	1'01:21.9	37
15 km	Mami Shindo-Horma	55:59.3	4	59:59.3	29
15 km	Ryoko Takahashi	53:17.4	3	56:17.4	6

Women's 4 × 7.5 km relay

Athletes	Race		
Athletes	Misses ^{1}	Time	Rank
Mami Shindo-Honma; Hiromi Seino-Suga; Mie Takeda; Ryoko Takahashi	1	1'46:23.0	14

^{1} A penalty loop of 150 metres had to be skied per missed target.
^{2} One minute added per missed target.

== Bobsleigh ==
Sled	Athletes	Event	Run 1		Run 2		Run 3		Run 4		Total	
Sled	Athletes	Event	Time	Rank	Time	Rank	Time	Rank	Time	Rank	Time	Rank
JPN-1	Naomi Takewaki; Hiroaki Ohishi	Two-man	55.31	17	55.24	20	55.20	20	54.96	16	3:40.71	17
JPN-2	Hiroshi Suzuki; Masanori Inoue	Two-man	55.47	20	55.10	16	55.19	19	55.04	19	3:40.80	19

Sled	Athletes	Event	Run 1		Run 2		Run 3		Total	
Sled	Athletes	Event	Time	Rank	Time	Rank	Time	Rank	Time	Rank
JPN-1	Naomi Takewaki; Hiroaki Ohishi; Takashi Ohori; Masanori Inoue	Four-man	53.73	14	53.87	18	53.95	15	2:41.55	15
JPN-2	Toshio Wakita; Yasuo Nakamura; Toshiya Onoda; Shinji Aoto	Four-man	54.02	19	53.66	11	54.28	16	2:41.96	16

== Cross-country skiing ==
Men

Event	Athlete	Race	
Event	Athlete	Time	Rank
10 km C	Mitsuo Horigome	29:44.8	36
10 km C	Katsuhito Ebisawa	29:30.0	34
10 km C	Masaaki Kozu	29:23.1	29
10 km C	Hiroyuki Imai	28:51.5	19
15 km pursuit^{1} F	Hiroyuki Imai	43:31.0	28
15 km pursuit^{1} F	Masaaki Kozu	42:59.9	24
15 km pursuit^{1} F	Mitsuo Horigome	42:47.1	22
15 km pursuit^{1} F	Katsuhito Ebisawa	42:46.0	21
30 km C	Masaaki Kozu	1'48:15.3	56
30 km C	Kazutoshi Nagahama	1'42:58.7	42
30 km C	Katsuhito Ebisawa	1'40:48.0	27
30 km C	Hiroyuki Imai	1'40:40.9	24
50 km F	Katsuhito Ebisawa	2'18:52.5	39
50 km F	Kazutoshi Nagahama	2'17:24.4	33
50 km F	Mitsuo Horigome	2'17:09.2	32
50 km F	Hiroyuki Imai	2'16:49.5	30

^{1} Starting delay based on 10 km results.
C = Classical style, F = Freestyle

Men's 4 × 10 km relay

Athletes	Race	
Athletes	Time	Rank
Katsuhito Ebisawa; Hiroyuki Imai; Mitsuo Horigome; Kazutoshi Nagahama	1'43:06.7	7

Women

Event	Athlete	Race	
Event	Athlete	Time	Rank
5 km C	Kumiko Yokoyama	19:34.5	50
5 km C	Tomomi Otaka	19:28.8	46
5 km C	Fumiko Aoki	19:04.8	31
5 km C	Sumiko Yokoyama	18:55.1	25
10 km pursuit^{2} F	Tomomi Otaka	33:21.9	48
10 km pursuit^{2} F	Kumiko Yokoyama	33:07.0	46
10 km pursuit^{2} F	Fumiko Aoki	31:50.1	29
10 km pursuit^{2} F	Sumiko Yokoyama	31:04.2	25
15 km C	Emiko Sato	54:11.1	54
15 km C	Fumiko Aoki	51:53.7	37
15 km C	Kumiko Yokoyama	51:48.7	34
15 km C	Sumiko Yokoyama	50:55.3	24
30 km F	Kumiko Yokoyama	1'33:19.7	39
30 km F	Midori Furusawa	1'33:16.2	38
30 km F	Sumiko Yokoyama	1'32:04.3	32

^{2} Starting delay based on 5 km results.
C = Classical style, F = Freestyle

Women's 4 × 5 km relay

Athletes	Race	
Athletes	Time	Rank
Tomomi Otaka; Sumiko Yokoyama; Fumiko Aoki; Kumiko Yokoyama	58:22.8	10

== Curling ==
=== Men's tournament ===
==== Group stage ====
Top four teams advanced to semi-finals.

Country	Skip	W	L
Canada	Mike Harris	6	1
Norway	Eigil Ramsfjell	5	2
Switzerland	Patrick Hürlimann	5	2
United States	Tim Somerville	3	4
Japan 5th	Makoto Tsuruga	3	4
Sweden	Peja Lindholm	3	4
Great Britain	Douglas Dryburgh	2	5
Germany	Andy Kapp	1	6

Team 1	Score	Team 2
Canada	7–4	Japan
Japan	6–5	Sweden
Switzerland	5–3	Japan
Norway	5–3	Japan
United Kingdom	9–5	Japan
Japan	8–6	United States
Japan	7–5	Germany

Tie-breaker

Team 1	Score	Team 2
United States	5–4	Japan

Contestants

Skip	Third	Second	Lead	Alternate
Makoto Tsuruga	Hiroshi Sato	Yoshiyuki Ohmiya	Hirofumi Kudo	Hisaaki Nakamine

=== Women's tournament ===
==== Group stage ====
Top four teams advanced to semi-finals.

Country	Skip	W	L
Canada	Sandra Schmirler	6	1
Sweden	Elisabet Gustafson	6	1
Denmark	Helena Blach Lavrsen	5	2
Great Britain	Kirsty Hay	4	3
Japan 5th	Mayumi Ohkutsu	2	5
Norway	Dordi Nordby	2	5
United States	Lisa Schoeneberg	2	5
Germany	Andrea Schöpp	1	6

Team 1	Score	Team 2
Japan	5–7	United Kingdom
Germany	2–9	Japan
Japan	4–7	Canada
Japan	6–12	Sweden
Japan	8–4	Norway
Denmark	6–4	Japan
United States	10–2	Japan

Contestants

Skip	Third	Second	Lead	Alternate
Mayumi Ohkutsu	Akiko Katoh	Yukari Kondo	Yoko Mimura	Akemi Niwa

== Figure skating ==
Men

Athlete	SP	FS	TFP	Rank
Yamato Tamura	15	17	24.5	17
Takeshi Honda	18	12	21.0	15

Women

Athlete	SP	FS	TFP	Rank
Shizuka Arakawa	14	14	21.0	13

Pairs

Athletes	SP	FS	TFP	Rank
Marie Arai; Shin Amano	20	20	30.0	20

Ice dancing

Athletes	CD1	CD2	OD	FD	TFP	Rank
Aya Kawai; Hiroshi Tanaka	21	23	23	23	45.6	23

== Freestyle skiing ==
Men

Athlete	Event	Qualification			Final		
Athlete	Event	Time	Points	Rank	Time	Points	Rank
Takehiro Sakamoto	Moguls	38.07	8.68	30	did not advance		
Yugo Tsukita	Moguls	25.90	23.81	18	did not advance		
Daigo Hara	Moguls	29.42	24.04	16 Q	31.27	12.13	15
Gota Miura	Moguls	28.97	24.14	15 Q	28.11	23.06	13
Kazuaki Ando	Aerials		135.12	23	did not advance		

Women

Athlete	Event	Qualification			Final		
Athlete	Event	Time	Points	Rank	Time	Points	Rank
Aiko Uemura	Moguls	36.16	21.82	13 Q	33.08	23.79	7
Tae Satoya	Moguls	34.73	22.29	11 Q	32.10	25.06	1st place, gold medalist(s)

== Ice hockey ==
=== Men's tournament ===
==== Preliminary round ====
Top team (shaded) advanced to the first round.

Team	GP	W	L	T	GF	GA	GD	Pts
Belarus	3	2	0	1	14	4	+10	5
Germany	3	2	1	0	7	9	-2	4
France	3	1	2	0	5	8	-3	2
Japan	3	0	2	1	5	10	-5	1

All times are local (UTC-7).

7 February 1998	Germany	3–1 (0–0, 1–0, 2–1)	Japan	The Big Hat/ Aqua Wing Arena, Nagano, Japan; Attendance: 9,861

9 February 1998	Japan	2–5 (2–1, 0–1, 0–3)	France	The Big Hat/ Aqua Wing Arena, Nagano, Japan; Attendance: 9,930

10 February 1998	Japan	2–2 (1–1, 1–1, 0–0)	Belarus	The Big Hat/ Aqua Wing Arena, Nagano, Japan; Attendance: 3,659

==== Consolation round ====
All times are local (UTC-7).

12 February 1998	Japan 13th	4–3 (SO) (1–2, 1–0, 1–1, 0–0, 1–0)	Austria	The Big Hat/ Aqua Wing Arena, Nagano, Japan; Attendance: 9,495

- Team roster

- Akihito Sugisawa
- Shin Yahata
- Tsutsumi Otomo
- Matt Kabayama
- Ryan Kuwabara
- Ryan Fujita
- Atsuo Kudo
- Toshiyuki Sakai
- Takeshi Yamanaka
- Hiroyuki Miura
- Yuji Iga
- Dusty Imoo
- Shinichi Iwasaki
- Tatsuki Katayama
- Makato Kawahira
- Takayuki Kobori
- Kunihiko Sakurai
- Takayuki Miura
- Steve Tsujiura
- Chris Yule

=== Women's tournament ===
==== Group stage ====
The first four teams (shaded green) advanced to medal round games.

Team	GP	W	L	T	GF	GA	Pts
United States	5	5	0	0	33	7	10
Canada	5	4	1	0	28	12	8
Finland	5	3	2	0	27	10	6
China	5	2	3	0	10	15	4
Sweden	5	1	4	0	10	21	2
Japan 6th	5	0	5	0	2	45	0

Team 1	Score	Team 2
Canada	13–0	Japan
Finland	11–1	Japan
Japan	1–6	China
United States	10–0	Japan
Japan	0–5	Sweden

Contestants; Miharu Araki; Shiho Fujiwara; Akiko Hatanaka; Mitsuko Igarashi; Yoko Kondo; Akiko Naka; Maiko Obikawa; Yuka Oda; Yukari Ohno; Chie Sakuma; Ayumi Sato; Masako Sato; Rie Sato; Satomi Ono; Yukio Satomi; Aki Sudo; Yuki Togawa; Aki Tsuchida; Haruka Watanabe; Naho Yoshimi

== Luge ==
Men

Athlete	Run 1		Run 2		Run 3		Run 4		Total	
Athlete	Time	Rank	Time	Rank	Time	Rank	Time	Rank	Time	Rank
Shigeaki Ushijima	50.747	20	50.405	17	50.716	19	50.435	15	3:22.303	16

(Men's) Doubles

Athletes	Run 1		Run 2		Total	
Athletes	Time	Rank	Time	Rank	Time	Rank
Atsushi Sasaki; Kei Takahashi	51.541	13	51.835	14	1:43.376	14

Women

Athlete	Run 1		Run 2		Run 3		Run 4		Total	
Athlete	Time	Rank	Time	Rank	Time	Rank	Time	Rank	Time	Rank
Eriko Yamada	53.494	26	53.015	25	51.595	14	51.319	15	3:29.423	21
Yumie Kobayashi	52.829	23	53.025	26	52.198	22	52.718	26	3:30.770	25
Shino Yanagisawa	52.762	22	52.706	24	52.243	24	52.123	23	3:29.834	23

== Nordic combined ==
Men's individual

Events:

- normal hill ski jumping
- 15 km cross-country skiing (start delay, based on ski jumping results)

Athlete	Event	Ski jumping		Cross-country time	Total rank
Athlete	Event	Points	Rank	Cross-country time	Total rank
Satoshi Mori	Individual	195.0	34	48:29.0	38
Kenji Ogiwara	Individual	226.0	9	42:42.2	4
Junichi Kogawa	Individual	232.0	4	45:36.8	23
Tsugiharu Ogiwara	Individual	232.5	3	42:46.4	6

Men's team

Four participants per team.

Events:

- normal hill ski jumping
- 5 km cross-country skiing (start delay, based on ski jumping results)

Athletes	Ski jumping		Cross-country time	Total rank
Athletes	Points	Rank	Cross-country time	Total rank
Tsugiharu Ogiwara; Satoshi Mori; Gen Tomii; Kenji Ogiwara	893.0	5	56:18.8	5

== Short track speed skating ==
Men

Athlete	Event	Round one		Quarterfinals		Semifinals		Finals	
Athlete	Event	Time	Rank	Time	Rank	Time	Rank	Time	Final rank
Satoru Terao	500 m	42.948	1 Q	1:05.470	4	did not advance			
Hitoshi Uematsu	500 m	43.428	2 Q	43.657	2 Q	43.697	1 QA	43.713	3rd place, bronze medalist(s)
Takafumi Nishitani	500 m	43.348	2 Q	42.980	2 Q	42.756 OR	1 Q	42.862	1st place, gold medalist(s)
Satoru Terao	1000 m	1:35.323	2 Q	1:29.398 OR	1 Q	1:32.636	5	did not advance	
Naoya Tamura	1000 m	1:31.168	1 Q	1:29.509	1 Q	1:42.908	4 QB	1:32.927	5
Hitoshi Uematsu	1000 m	1:30.466	1 Q	DSQ	–	did not advance			
Satoru Terao; Naoya Tamura; Takehiro Kodera; Yugo Shinohara	5000 m relay					7:17.223	4 QB	7:01.660 OR	5

Women

Athlete	Event	Round one		Quarterfinals		Semifinals		Finals	
Athlete	Event	Time	Rank	Time	Rank	Time	Rank	Time	Final rank
Chikage Tanaka	500 m	46.786	1 Q	56.798	3 ADV	46.497	5	did not advance	
Ikue Teshigawara	500 m	47.354	1 Q	52.693	3 ADV	45.736	3 QB	46.889	6
Ayako Tsubaki	500 m	46.950	4	did not advance					
Ikue Teshigawara	1000 m	1:35.964	1 Q	1:38.446	2 Q	1:35.266	3 QB	1:37.693	5
Sachi Ozawa	1000 m	1:35.275	2 Q	1:37.493	3	did not advance			
Chikage Tanaka	1000 m	1:39.822	2 Q	1:36.570	4	did not advance			
Ikue Teshigawara; Chikage Tanaka; Nobuko Yamada; Sachi Ozawa	3000 m relay					4:24.087	1 QA	4:30.612	4

== Ski jumping ==
Athlete	Event	Jump 1			Jump 2		Total	
Athlete	Event	Distance	Points	Rank	Distance	Points	Points	Rank
Hiroya Saito	Normal hill	86.5	110.5	7 Q	83.0	103.0	213.5	9
Noriaki Kasai	Normal hill	87.5	113.5	5 Q	84.5	108.0	221.5	7
Kazuyoshi Funaki	Normal hill	87.5	114.0	4 Q	90.5	119.5	233.5	2nd place, silver medalist(s)
Masahiko Harada	Normal hill	91.5	121.0	1 Q	84.5	107.5	228.5	5
Hiroya Saito	Large hill	100.0	79.5	47	did not advance			
Masahiko Harada	Large hill	120.0	117.0	6 Q	136.0	141.3	258.3	3rd place, bronze medalist(s)
Kazuyoshi Funaki	Large hill	126.0	129.8	4 Q	132.5	142.5	272.3	1st place, gold medalist(s)
Takanobu Okabe	Large hill	130.0	134.0	2 Q	119.5	116.1	250.1	6

Men's team large hill

Athletes	Result	
Athletes	Points ^{1}	Rank
Takanobu Okabe; Hiroya Saito; Masahiko Harada; Kazuyoshi Funaki	933.0	1st place, gold medalist(s)

^{1} Four teams members performed two jumps each.

== Snowboarding ==
Men's halfpipe

Athlete	Qualifying round 1		Qualifying round 2		Final	
Athlete	Points	Rank	Points	Rank	Points	Rank
Takamasa Imai	24.4	35	24.4	28	did not advance	
Takashi Nishida	32.2	28	33.4	20	did not advance	
Makoto Takagaki	34.6	20	32.2	22	did not advance	
Shinichi Watanabe	35.7	15	29.1	26	did not advance	

Women's giant slalom

Athlete	Race 1	Race 2	Total	
Athlete	Time	Time	Time	Rank
Shinobu Ueshima	1:16.88	1:11.17	2:28.05	15

Women's halfpipe

Athlete	Qualifying round 1		Qualifying round 2		Final	
Athlete	Points	Rank	Points	Rank	Points	Rank
Kaori Takeyama	23.5	23	22.7	18	did not advance	
Yuri Yoshikawa	25.6	20	24.9	16	did not advance	

== Speed skating ==
Men

Event	Athlete	Race 1		Race 2		Total	
Event	Athlete	Time	Rank	Time	Rank	Time	Rank
500 m	Hiroaki Yamakage	36.61	19	36.30	10	72.91	15
500 m	Toshiyuki Kuroiwa	36.37	12	36.60	24	72.97	16
500 m	Manabu Horii	36.37	12	36.41	15	72.78	13
500 m	Hiroyasu Shimizu	35.76	1	35.59 OR	1	71.35	1st place, gold medalist(s)
1000 m	Hiroyuki Noake					1:12.68	25
1000 m	Manabu Horii					1:12.40	17
1000 m	Yusuke Imai					1:11.96	11
1000 m	Hiroyasu Shimizu					1:11.00	3rd place, bronze medalist(s)
1500 m	Keiji Shirahata					1:52.23	21
1500 m	Yusuke Imai					1:51.70	16
1500 m	Toru Aoyanagi					1:50.68	8
1500 m	Hiroyuki Noake					1:50.49	7
5000 m	Hiroyuki Noake					6:51.35	25
5000 m	Takahiro Nozaki					6:42.30	17
5000 m	Keiji Shirahata					6:36.71	7
10,000 m	Keiji Shirahata					13:57.45	14

Women

Event	Athlete	Race 1		Race 2		Total	
Event	Athlete	Time	Rank	Time	Rank	Time	Rank
500 m	Shiho Kusunose	39.56	14	39.24	8	78.80	12
500 m	Eriko Sanmiya	39.25	12	39.31	9	78.56	11
500 m	Kyoko Shimazaki	38.75	4	38.93	5	77.68	5
500 m	Tomomi Okazaki	38.55	3	38.55	3	77.10	3rd place, bronze medalist(s)
1000 m	Kyoko Shimazaki					1:20.49	22
1000 m	Shiho Kusunose					1:18.82	11
1000 m	Eriko Sanmiya					1:18.36	8
1000 m	Tomomi Okazaki					1:18.27	7
1500 m	Shiho Kusunose					2:04.38	23
1500 m	Mie Uehara					2:03.37	21
1500 m	Aki Tonoike					2:02.84	16
1500 m	Chiharu Nozaki					2:02.78	15
3000 m	Noriko Munekata					4:20.72	18
3000 m	Chiharu Nozaki					4:19.60	17
3000 m	Mie Uehara					4:17.92	14
5000 m	Nami Nemoto					7:36.77	15
5000 m	Mie Uehara					7:21.72	11
