= Japan at the 2002 Winter Olympics =

- IOC code: JPN
- NOC: Japanese Olympic Committee
- Website: www.joc.or.jp (in Japanese and English)

in Salt Lake City
- Competitors: 103 (59 men, 44 women) in 14 sports
- Flag bearer: Daijiro Kato
- Medals Ranked 21st: Gold 0 Silver 1 Bronze 1 Total 2

Winter Olympics appearances (overview)
- 1928; 1932; 1936; 1948; 1952; 1956; 1960; 1964; 1968; 1972; 1976; 1980; 1984; 1988; 1992; 1994; 1998; 2002; 2006; 2010; 2014; 2018; 2022; 2026

Japan competed at the 2002 Winter Olympics in Salt Lake City, United States.

== Medalists ==
Medal	Name	Sport	Event	Date
Silver	Hiroyasu Shimizu	Speed skating	Men's 500 m	February 12
Bronze	Tae Satoya	Freestyle skiing	Women's moguls	February 9

Medals by sport
Sport	1st place, gold medalist(s)	2nd place, silver medalist(s)	3rd place, bronze medalist(s)	Total
Speed skating	0	1	0	1
Freestyle skiing	0	0	1	1
Total	0	1	1	2

== Alpine skiing ==
Men

Athlete	Event	Race 1	Race 2	Total	
Athlete	Event	Time	Time	Time	Rank
Yasuyuki Takishita	Downhill			1:43.75	42
Yasuyuki Takishita	Super-G			DNF	–
Kiminobu Kimura	Giant Slalom	1:17.19	1:14.67	2:31.86	37
Akira Sasaki	Giant Slalom	1:16.11	1:14.47	2:30.58	34
Kentaro Minagawa	Slalom	DSQ	–	DSQ	–
Akira Sasaki	Slalom	DNF	–	DNF	–
Kiminobu Kimura	Slalom	52.46	55.97	1:48.43	18

Women

Athlete	Event	Race 1	Race 2	Total	
Athlete	Event	Time	Time	Time	Rank
Kumiko Kashiwagi	Giant Slalom	1:19.90	1:19.65	2:39.55	35
Noriyo Hiroi	Giant Slalom	1:19.85	1:18.12	2:37.97	29
Noriyo Hiroi	Slalom	56.35	55.63	1:51.98	14
Kumiko Kashiwagi	Slalom	56.14	56.27	1:52.41	16

== Biathlon ==
Men

Event	Athlete	Misses ^{1}	Time	Rank
10 km sprint	Yukio Mochizuki	2	28:28.5	69
10 km sprint	Hidenori Isa	2	28:03.6	62
10 km sprint	Kyoji suga	1	27:21.0	41
12.5 km pursuit ^{2}	Kyoji Suga	3	36:28.8	35

Event	Athlete	Time	Misses	Adjusted time ^{3}	Rank
20 km	Hironao Meguro	56:29.2	3	59:29.2	66
20 km	Hidenori Isa	52:52.8	4	56:52.8	44
20 km	Kyoji Suga	52:51.9	2	54:51.9	20

Men's 4 × 7.5 km relay

Athletes	Race		
Athletes	Misses ^{1}	Time	Rank
Hironao Meguro; Hidenori Isa; Kyoji Suga; Yukio Mochizuki	2	1'29:04.4	13

Women

Event	Athlete	Misses ^{1}	Time	Rank
7.5 km sprint	Mami Shindo-Honma	2	23:36.8	45
7.5 km sprint	Hiromi Seino-Suga	2	23:03.5	30
7.5 km sprint	Tamami Tanaka	2	23:00.0	29
7.5 km sprint	Ryoko Takahashi	2	22:58.3	28
10 km pursuit ^{4}	Mami Shindo-Honma	3	36:28.6	41
10 km pursuit ^{4}	Ryoko Takahashi	3	35:20.6	36
10 km pursuit ^{4}	Hiromi Seino-Suga	1	34:18.8	24
10 km pursuit ^{4}	Tamami Tanaka	2	34:07.7	23

Event	Athlete	Time	Misses	Adjusted time ^{3}	Rank
15 km	Mami Shindo-Honma	51:38.6	8	59:38.6	64
15 km	Ryoko Takahashi	50:18.0	4	54:18.0	50
15 km	Tamami Tanaka	49:40.4	4	53:40.4	45
15 km	Hiromi Seino-Suga	50:10.6	3	53:10.6	42

Women's 4 × 7.5 km relay

Athletes	Race		
Athletes	Misses ^{1}	Time	Rank
Mami Shindo-Honma; Tamami Tanaka; Hiromi Seino-Suga; Ryoko Takahashi	1	1'35:09.8	14

^{1} A penalty loop of 150 metres had to be skied per missed target.
^{2} Starting delay based on 10 km sprint results.
^{3} One minute added per missed target.
^{4} Starting delay based on 7.5 km sprint results.

== Bobsleigh ==
Men

Sled	Athletes	Event	Run 1		Run 2		Run 3		Run 4		Total	
Sled	Athletes	Event	Time	Rank	Time	Rank	Time	Rank	Time	Rank	Time	Rank
JPN-1	Masanori Inoue; Hiroshi Suzuki	Two-man	48.41	21	48.61	27	48.58	24	48.36	18	3:13.96	21
JPN-2	Shinji Miura; Hiroaki Ohishi	Two-man	48.61	28	48.70	28	49.08	29	48.70	24	3:15.09	29

Sled	Athletes	Event	Run 1		Run 2		Run 3		Run 4		Total	
Sled	Athletes	Event	Time	Rank	Time	Rank	Time	Rank	Time	Rank	Time	Rank
JPN-1	Hiroshi Suzuki; Sinji Miura; Shinji Doigawa; Masanori Inoue	Four-man	47.65	23	47.46	21	47.92	19	48.14	19	3:11.17	20

== Cross-country skiing ==
Men

Sprint

Athlete	Qualifying round		Quarter finals		Semi finals		Finals	
Athlete	Time	Rank	Time	Rank	Time	Rank	Time	Final rank
Masaaki Kozu	3:05.90	47	did not advance					
Daichi Azegami	3:01.47	38	did not advance					

Pursuit

Athlete	10 km C		10 km F pursuit^{1}	
Athlete	Time	Rank	Time	Final rank
Katsuhito Ebisawa	28:45.2	55 Q	27:14.3	49
Mitsuo Horigome	27:50.3	38 Q	25:30.5	33
Hiroyuki Imai	27:42.6	36 Q	25:32.8	34
Masaaki Kozu	27:37.6	34 Q	25:05.6	24

Event	Athlete	Race	
Event	Athlete	Time	Rank
15 km C	Katsuhito Ebisawa	41:54.4	50
15 km C	Hiroshi Kudo	40:29.9	38
15 km C	Hiroyuki Imai	40:27.1	36
15 km C	Masaaki Kozu	39:28.3	19
30 km F	Mitsuo Horigome	1'18:06.3	48
30 km F	Katsuhito Ebisawa	1'17:18.2	42
30 km F	Masaaki Kozu	1'15:32.4	30
30 km F	Hiroyuki Imai	1'14:55.6	27
50 km C	Hiroshi Kudo	2'23:02.3	41
50 km C	Katsuhito Ebisawa	2'21:05.3	38
50 km C	Masaaki Kozu	2'17:51.9	27
50 km C	Hiroyuki Imai	2'09:41.3	6

^{1} Starting delay based on 10 km C. results.
C = Classical style, F = Freestyle

4 × 10 km relay

Athletes	Race	
Athletes	Time	Rank
Masaaki Kozu; Hiroyuki Imai; Mitsuo Horigome; Katsuhito Ebisawa	1'37:50.5	12

Women

Sprint

Athlete	Qualifying round		Quarter finals		Semi finals		Finals	
Athlete	Time	Rank	Time	Rank	Time	Rank	Time	Final rank
Tomomi Otaka	3:34.14	47	did not advance					
Nobuko Fukuda	3:28.38	39	did not advance					
Madoka Natsumi	3:18.78	16 Q	3:17.5	3	did not advance			

Pursuit

Athlete	5 km C		5 km F pursuit^{2}	
Athlete	Time	Rank	Time	Final rank
Madoka Natsumi	14:51.4	59	did not advance	
Nobuko Fukuda	14:31.6	50	did not advance	
Sumiko Yokoyama	14:22.4	44 Q	13:25.1	27
Kanoko Goto	14:16.1	38 Q	13:37.4	38

Event	Athlete	Race	
Event	Athlete	Time	Rank
10 km C	Tomomi Otaka	32:27.9	48
10 km C	Madoka Natsumi	31:54.1	47
10 km C	Kanoko Goto	30:36.6	32
10 km C	Sumiko Yokoyama	30:32.3	31
15 km F	Nobuko Fukuda	DNF	–
15 km F	Midori Furusawa	44:41.8	42
15 km F	Kanoko Goto	42:50.4	27
15 km F	Sumiko Yokoyama	42:16.2	22
30 km C	Tomomi Otaka	1'50:00.3	43
30 km C	Midori Furusawa	1'45:50.0	36
30 km C	Madoka Natsumi	1'41:06.0	26
30 km C	Sumiko Yokoyama	1'39:48.8	21

^{2} Starting delay based on 5 km C. results.
C = Classical style, F = Freestyle

4 × 5 km relay

Athletes	Race	
Athletes	Time	Rank
Kanoko Goto; Madoka Natsumi; Nobuko Fukuda; Sumiko Yokoyama	51:35.7	10

== Curling ==
=== Women's tournament ===
==== Group stage ====
Country	Skip	W	L
Canada	Kelley Law	8	1
Switzerland	Luzia Ebnöther	7	2
United States	Kari Erickson	6	3
(United Kingdom) Great Britain	Rhona Martin	5	4
Germany	Natalie Neßler	5	4
Sweden	Elisabet Gustafson	5	4
Norway	Dordi Nordby	4	5
Japan 8th	Akiko Katoh	2	7
Denmark	Lene Bidstrup	2	7
Russia	Olga Jarkova	1	8

Team 1	Score	Team 2
Japan	7–8	United States
(United Kingdom) Great Britain	9–1	Japan
Germany	5–3	Japan
Japan	7–8	Switzerland
Japan	7–8	Sweden
Canada	9–4	Japan
Japan	5–8	Norway
Russia	6–7	Japan
Denmark	5–6	Japan

Contestants

Japan
Tokoro CC, Kitami

Skip: Akiko Katoh
Third: Yumie Hayashi
Second: Ayumi Onodera
Lead: Mika Konaka
Alternate: Kotomi Ishizaki

== Figure skating ==
Men

Athlete	Points	SP	FS	Rank
Yosuke Takeuchi	32.0	24	20	22
Takeshi Honda	5.0	2	4	4

Women

Athlete	Points	SP	FS	Rank
Yoshie Onda	22.5	17	14	17
Fumie Suguri	8.5	7	5	5

== Freestyle skiing ==
Men

Athlete	Event	Qualification			Final		
Athlete	Event	Time	Points	Rank	Time	Points	Rank
Teppei Noda	Moguls	DNF	0.30	30	did not advance		
Katsuya Nakamoto	Moguls	30.70	20.56	26	did not advance		
Kenro Shimoyama	Moguls	30.20	23.39	20	did not advance		
Yugo Tsukita	Moguls	29.20	25.33	9 Q	29.82	15.81	16
Taku Nakanishi	Aerials		162.89	20	did not advance		

Women

Athlete	Event	Qualification			Final		
Athlete	Event	Time	Points	Rank	Time	Points	Rank
Miyuki Hatanaka	Moguls	39.49	21.36	20	did not advance		
Tae Satoya	Moguls	37.21	23.65	6 Q	34.23	24.85	3rd place, bronze medalist(s)
Aiko Uemura	Moguls	37.00	23.82	4 Q	35.48	24.66	6

== Luge ==
Men

Athlete	Run 1		Run 2		Run 3		Run 4		Total	
Athlete	Time	Rank	Time	Rank	Time	Rank	Time	Rank	Time	Rank
Shigeaki Ushijima	45.905	29	45.260	24	45.283	27	45.651	28	3:02.099	27

(Men's) Doubles

Athletes	Run 1		Run 2		Total	
Athletes	Time	Rank	Time	Rank	Time	Rank
Takahisa Oguchi; Kei Takahashi	DNF	–	–	–	DNF	–

Women

Athlete	Run 1		Run 2		Run 3		Run 4		Total	
Athlete	Time	Rank	Time	Rank	Time	Rank	Time	Rank	Time	Rank
Yumie Kobayashi	44.192	19	44.107	23	44.149	24	44.215	23	2:56.663	25

== Nordic combined ==
Men's sprint

Events:

- large hill ski jumping
- 7.5 km cross-country skiing (Start delay, based on ski jumping results.)

Athlete	Ski Jumping		Cross-country time	Total rank
Athlete	Points	Rank	Cross-country time	Total rank
Kenji Ogiwara	93.5	34	18:39.1	33
Norihito Kobayashi	101.1	24	18:04.6	17
Satoshi Mori	106.9	14	18:25.0	22
Daito Takahashi	114.4	4	17:37.9	6

Men's individual

Events:

- normal hill ski jumping
- 15 km cross-country skiing (Start delay, based on ski jumping results.)

Athlete	Ski Jumping		Cross-country time	Total rank
Athlete	Points	Rank	Cross-country time	Total rank
Satoshi Mori	221.5	22	44:40.6	30
Kenji Ogiwara	233.0	13	41:56.6	11
Gen Tomii	234.5	12	45:15.4	33
Daito Takahashi	243.5	6	42:01.2	12

Men's Team

Four participants per team.

Events:

- normal hill ski jumping
- 5 km cross-country skiing (Start delay, based on ski jumping results.)

Athletes	Ski jumping		Cross-country time	Total rank
Athletes	Points	Rank	Cross-country time	Total rank
Gen Tomii; Kenji Ogiwara; Satoshi Mori; Daito Takahashi	901.0	4	52:26.5	8

== Short track speed skating ==
Men

Athlete	Event	Round one		Quarter finals		Semi finals		Finals	
Athlete	Event	Time	Rank	Time	Rank	Time	Rank	Time	Final rank
Takafumi Nishitani	500 m	43.211	1 Q	45.535	3	did not advance			
Satoru Terao	500 m	42.334	2 Q	42.692	1 Q	1:05.790	3 ADV	42:219	5
Satoru Terao	1000 m	1:31.025	2 Q	1:28.241	2 Q	DSQ	–	DSQ	–
Naoya Tamura	1000 m	1:28.867	1 Q	1:29.864	3 ADV	1:27.751	4 QB	1:35.823	7
Satoru Terao	1500 m	2:23.680	3 Q			DSQ	–	DSQ	–
Naoya Tamura	1500 m	3:06.585	5			did not advance			
Takafumi Nishitani; Satoru Terao; Yugo Shinohara; Takehiro Kodera; Naoya Tamura	5000 m relay					6:50.925	3 QB	7:19.893	5

Women

Athlete	Event	Round one		Quarter finals		Semi finals		Finals	
Athlete	Event	Time	Rank	Time	Rank	Time	Rank	Time	Final rank
Chikage Tanaka	500 m	45.193	1 Q	DSQ	–	–	–	DSQ	–
Yuka Kamino	500 m	45.933	4	did not advance					
Ikue Teshigawara	1000 m	1:33.855	3	did not advance					
Chikage Tanaka	1000 m	1:42.332	1 Q	1:34.960	2 Q	1:38.269	3 QB	1:35.125	7
Yuka Kamino	1500 m	2:52.591	4			did not advance			
Chikage Tanaka	1500 m	2:29.202	1 Q			2:21.924	4 QB	2:31.479	7
Chikage Tanaka; Yuka Kamino; Ikue Teshigawara; Atsuko Takata; Nobuko Yamada	3000 m relay					4:17.968	2 Q	4:21.107	4

== Skeleton ==
Men

Athlete	Run 1		Run 2		Total	
Athlete	Time	Rank	Time	Rank	Time	Rank
Masaru Inada	52.05	16	51.93	16	1:43.98	18
Kazuhiro Koshi	51.50	6	51.52	10	1:43.02	8

Women

Athlete	Run 1		Run 2		Total	
Athlete	Time	Rank	Time	Rank	Time	Rank
Eiko Nakayama	54.00	12	54.72	12	1:48.72	12

== Ski jumping ==
Athlete	Event	Qualifying jump			Final jump 1			Final jump 2		Total	
Athlete	Event	Distance	Points	Rank	Distance	Points	Rank	Distance	Points	Points	Rank
Noriaki Kasai	Normal hill	85.0	101.5	29 Q	85.0	83.0	49	did not advance			
Hiroki Yamada	Normal hill	84.5	103.0	28 Q	88.0	109.5	33	did not advance			
Masahiko Harada	Normal hill	90.5	114.5	11 Q	91.0	117.5	14 Q	89.5	114.5	232.0	20
Kazuyoshi Funaki	Normal hill	Pre-qualified			92.0	119.5	10 Q	94.5	123.5	243.0	9
Hideharu Miyahira	Large hill	111.5	97.7	19 Q	117.0	108.6	29 Q	116.0	106.8	215.4	24
Noriaki Kasai	Large hill	113.0	101.9	14 Q	110.0	97.5	41	did not advance			
Masahiko Harada	Large hill	19.5	116.1	2 Q	119.5	115.1	20 Q	116.5	107.7	222.8	20
Kazuyoshi Funaki	Large hill	Pre-qualified			126.5	128.7	5 Q	121.0	116.8	245.5	7

Men's team large hill

Athletes	Result	
Athletes	Points ^{1}	Rank
Masahiko Harada; Hiroki Yamada; Hideharu Miyahira; Kazuyoshi Funaki	926.0	5

^{1} Four teams members performed two jumps each.

== Snowboarding ==
Men's halfpipe

Athlete	Qualifying round 1		Qualifying round 2		Final	
Athlete	Points	Rank	Points	Rank	Points	Rank
Kentaro Miyawaki	13.6	31	27.0	23	did not advance	
Daisuke Murakami	19.4	27	32.7	13	did not advance	
Takaharu Nakai	38.3	6 Q			40.7	5

Women's parallel giant slalom

Athlete	Qualifying		Round one	Quarter final	Semi final	Final	Rank
Athlete	Time	Rank	Round one	Quarter final	Semi final	Final	Rank
Tomoka Takeuchi	43.76	22	did not advance				
Ran Iida	43.06	16 Q	DSQ	–	–	DSQ	–

Women's halfpipe

Athlete	Qualifying round 1		Qualifying round 2		Final	
Athlete	Points	Rank	Points	Rank	Points	Rank
Nagako Mori	14.4	21	13.0	16	did not advance	
Yuri Yoshikawa	17.7	19	21.8	14	did not advance	
Yoko Miyake	24.5	14	35.4	5 Q	33.7	8
Michiyo Hashimoto	27.0	12	38.0	3 Q	26.6	12

== Speed skating ==
Men

Event	Athlete	Race 1		Race 2		Total	
Event	Athlete	Time	Rank	Time	Rank	Time	Rank
500 m	Manabu Horii	35.30	15	35.02	15	70.32	14
500 m	Kuniomi Haneishi	35.15	13	34.96	12	70.11	12
500 m	Toyoki Takeda	35.00	8	34.81	6	69.81	8
500 m	Hiroyasu Shimizu	34.61	2	34.65	2	69.26	2nd place, silver medalist(s)
1000 m	Hiroyuki Noake					1:49.18	44
1000 m	Manabu Horii					1:09.50	22
1000 m	Toyoki Takeda					1:08.95	16
1000 m	Yusuke Imai					1:08.90	15
1500 m	Yusuke Imai					1:48.76	34
1500 m	Keiji Shirahata					1:47.78	25
1500 m	Takaharu Nakajima					1:47.64	23
1500 m	Hiroyuki Noake					1:46.38	15
5000 m	Hiroki Hirako					6:30.46	17
5000 m	Keiji Shirahata					6:28.95	13
5000 m	Toshihiko Itokawa					6:27.52	12
10,000 m	Toshihiko Itokawa					13:31.96	11
10,000 m	Keiji Shirahata					13:20.40	4

Women

Event	Athlete	Race 1		Race 2		Total	
Event	Athlete	Time	Rank	Time	Rank	Time	Rank
500 m	Eriko Sanmiya	38.25	12	38.12	9	76.37	11
500 m	Yukari Watanabe	37.98	9	38.22	10	76.20	9
500 m	Sayuri Osuga	37.82	8	38.60	16	76.42	12
500 m	Tomomi Okazaki	37.77	7	37.87	6	75.64	6
1000 m	Maki Tabata					DSQ	–
1000 m	Sayuri Osuga					1:16.48	18
1000 m	Eriko Sanmiya					1:16.26	17
1000 m	Aki Tonoike					1:14.64	7
1500 m	Yuri Obara					2:01.39	29
1500 m	Yayoi Nagaoka					1:59.93	24
1500 m	Aki Tonoike					1:57.97	14
1500 m	Maki Tabata					1:56.35	9
3000 m	Eriko Seo					4:12.33	19
3000 m	Nami Nemoto					4:11.92	18
3000 m	Maki Tabata					4:03.63	6
5000 m	Nami Nemoto					DNF	–
5000 m	Maki Tabata					7:06.32	8
