= Luge at the 2010 Winter Olympics – Women's singles =

Women's singles at the XXI Olympic Winter Games
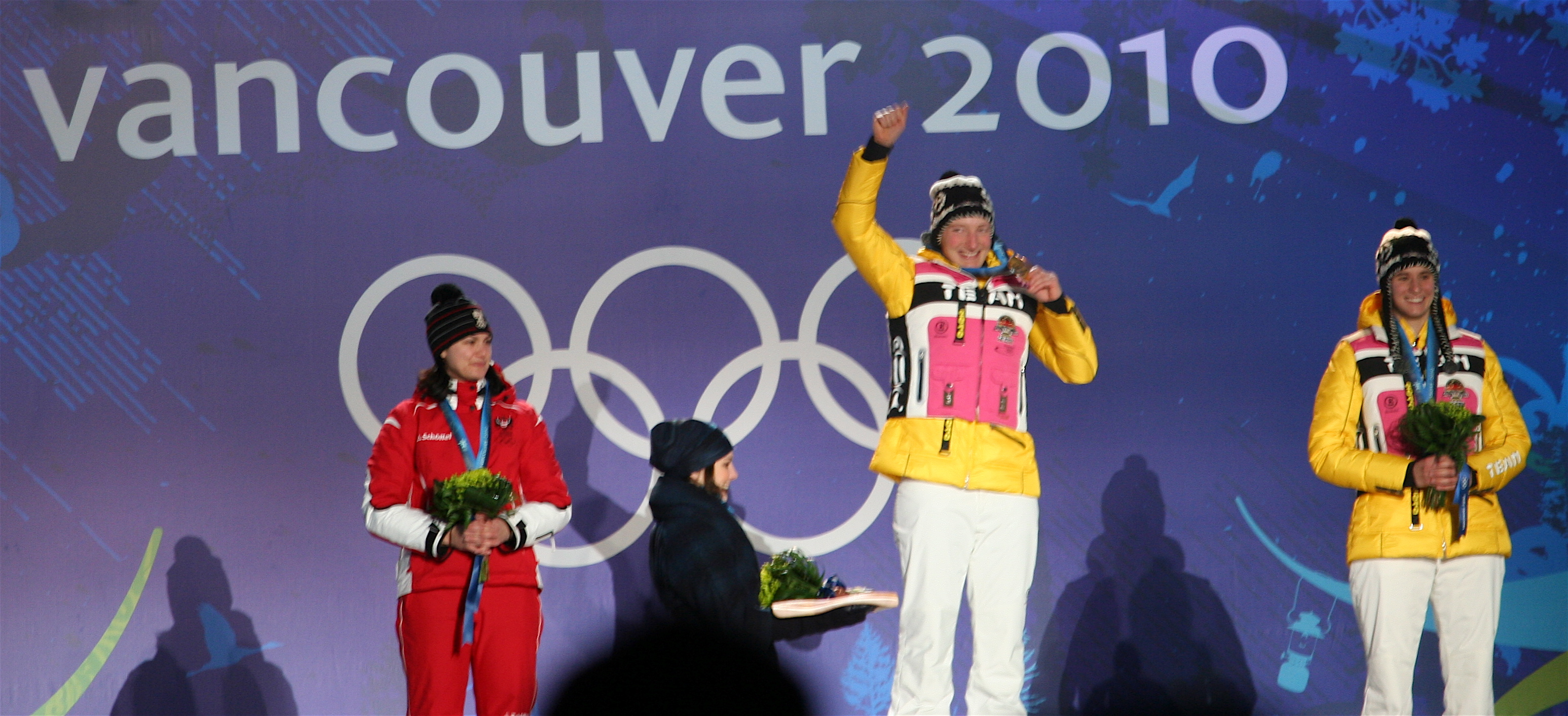
- Photo of the medal ceremony
- Venue: Whistler Sliding Centre
- Dates: 15–16 February 2010
- Competitors: 29 from 14 nations
- Winning time: 2:46.524

Medalists
1st place, gold medalist(s)		Tatjana Hüfner	Germany
2nd place, silver medalist(s)		Nina Reithmayer	Austria
3rd place, bronze medalist(s)		Natalie Geisenberger	Germany

The women's luge at the 2010 Winter Olympics in Vancouver, Canada took place on 15–16 February at the Whistler Sliding Centre in Whistler, British Columbia. Germany's Sylke Otto was the two-time defending Olympic champion. Otto retired midway through the 2006-07 season in January 2007 to pregnancy and after suffering a crash at the track in Königssee, Germany. Erin Hamlin of the United States was the defending world champion. The test event that took place at the venue was won by Germany's Natalie Geisenberger. The last World Cup event prior to the 2010 games took place in Cesana, Italy on 31 January 2010 and was won by Geisenberger. Geisenberger's teammate Tatjana Hüfner, the defending Olympic bronze medalist, won the overall World Cup for 2009-10 season in women's singles.

== Records ==
While the IOC does not consider luge times eligible for Olympic records, the International Luge Federation (FIL) does maintain records for both the start and a complete run at each track it competes.

These records were set during the test event at the women's singles/ men's doubles start house for the 2010 Games on 20 February 2009.

Type	Date	Athlete	Time
Start	20 February 2009	Natalie Geisenberger (GER)	7.183
Track	20 February 2009	Natalie Geisenberger (GER)	48.992

== Death of Nodar Kumaritashvili ==
During training on February 12, 2010, Georgian luger, Nodar Kumaritashvili was going at over 143 kilometres per hour (89 mph) when he crashed in the last turn and hit a steel pole. He was administered CPR at the track, then taken away to hospital where he was later pronounced dead. Training was immediately stopped. As a result, the start of the men's single competition was moved to the women's/doubles' start to reduce speed and the wall at corner where Kumaritashvili crashed was raised.

Investigations were conducted the same day, concluding that the accident was not caused by deficiencies in the track. A joint statement was issued by the FIL, the International Olympic Committee, and the Vancouver Organizing Committee over Kurmaitasvili's death with training suspended for the rest of that day. According to the Coroners Service of British Columbia and the Royal Canadian Mounted Police, the cause was to Kumaritashvili coming out of turn 15 late and not compensating for turn 16. Because of this fatality, an extra 40 yd (37 m) of wall was added after the end of turn 16 and the ice profile was changed. It also moved the men's singles luge event from its starthouse to the one for both the women's singles and men's doubles event. Kumaritashvili is the first Olympic athlete to die at the Winter Olympics in training since 1992 and the first luger to die in a practice event at the Winter Olympics since Kazimierz Kay-Skrzypeski of Great Britain was killed at the luge track used for the 1964 Winter Olympics in Innsbruck. It was also luge's first fatality (on an artificial track) since 10 December 1975, when an Italian luger was killed. Kumaritavili's teammate Levan Gureshidze withdrew prior to the first run of the event.

Women's singles and men's doubles start was moved to the Junior start house of the track, located after turn 6. Germany's Geisenberger complained that it was not a women's start but more of a kinder ("child" in German) start. Her teammate Hüfner who had the fastest speed on two runs of 82.3 mph (132.4 km/h) stated that the new start position "..does not help good starters like myself". American Erin Hamlin stated the track was still demanding even after the distance was lessened from 1,193 to 953 m (3,914 to 3,127 ft) and that you were still hitting 80 mph (130 km/h).

On 23 March 2010, FIL President Fendt, VANOC President John Furlong, 2010 men's singles gold medalist Felix Loch of Germany visited Kumaritashvili's grave in his hometown of Bakuriani to pay respects as part of tradition in the Georgian Orthodox Church.

The FIL published their report in regards to Kumaritashvili's death after the FIL Commissions Meeting in St. Leonhard, in Graz, Austria, for both sport and technical commissions on 9–11 April 2010. This report was prepared by FIL Secretary General Svein Romstad and Vice President Claire DelNegro, who are from the United States.

== Qualifying athletes ==
These are the athletes who qualified for the women's singles event as of 4 February 2010.

- Hannah Campbell-Pegg (AUS)
- Mihaela Chiras (ROU)
- Julia Clukey (USA)
- Sandra Gasparini (ITA)
- Natalie Geisenberger (GER)
- Alex Gough (CAN)
- Veronika Halder (AUT)
- Erin Hamlin (USA)
- Madoka Harada (JPN)
- Tatjana Hüfner (GER)
- Tatiana Ivanova (RUS)
- Natalia Khoreva (RUS)
- Martina Kocher (SUI)
- Agnese Koklaca (LAT)
- Regan Lauscher (CAN)
- Liliya Ludan (UKR)
- Anna Orlova (LAT)
- Nina Reithmayer (AUT)
- Alexandra Rodionova (RUS)
- Veronika Sabolová (SVK)
- Meaghan Simister (CAN)
- Jana Šišajová (SVK)
- Ewelina Staszulonek (POL)
- Raluca Strămăturaru (ROU)
- Violeta Strămăturaru (ROU) (withdrawn)
- Megan Sweeney (USA)
- Maija Tīruma (LAT)
- Anke Wischnewski (GER)
- Natalya Yakuchenko (UKR)
- Aya Yasuda (JPN)

== Results ==
The first two runs took place on 15 February at 17:00 PST and 18:30 PST. On 16 February, the final two runs took place at 13:00 PST and 14:30 PST.

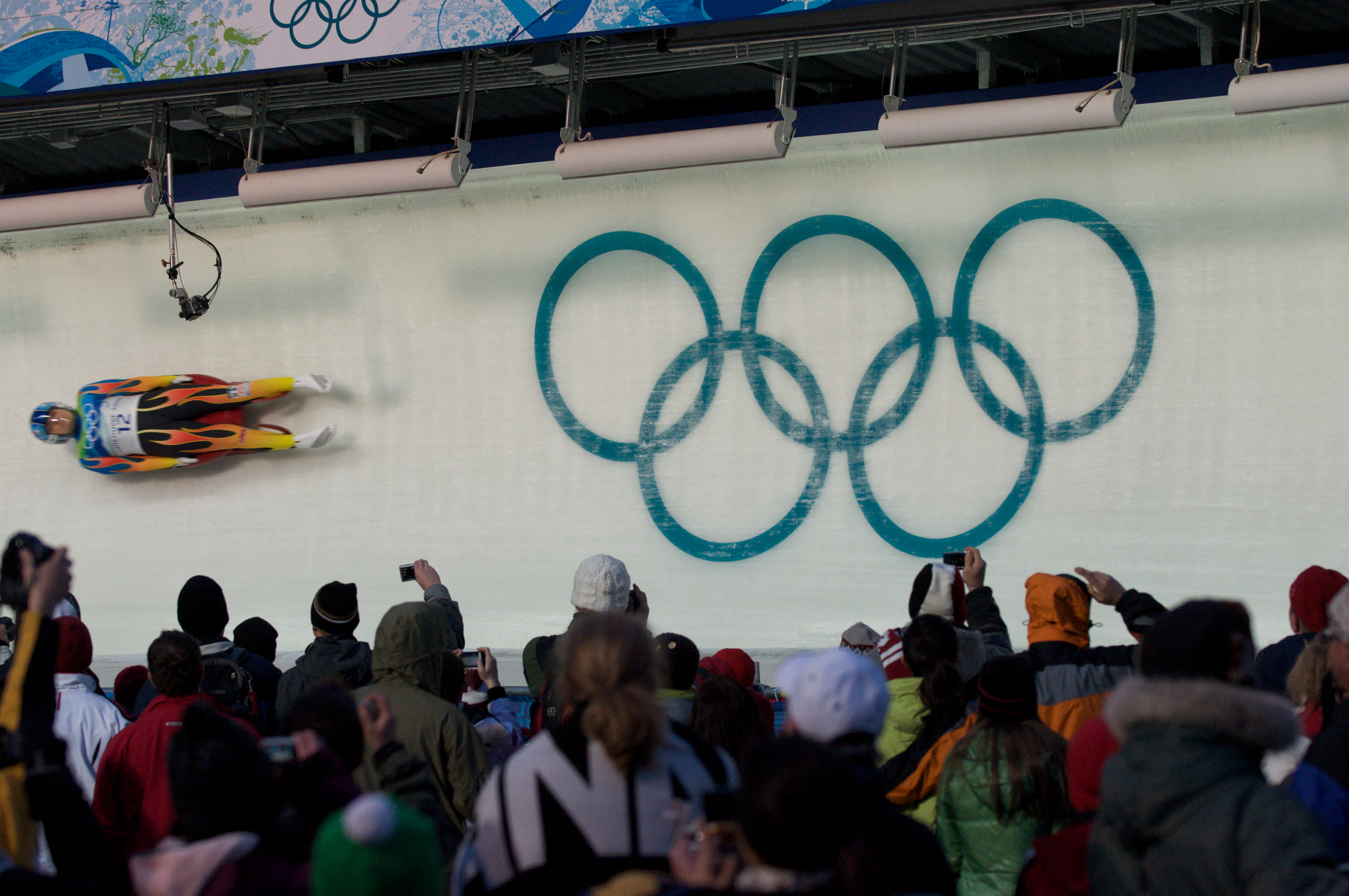
Julia Clukey during one of runs on the first day of the competition

First run start order was released on the morning of 15 February 2010.

Romania's Violeta Stramturaru was knocked unconscious on 11 February 2010 after slamming into several walls during a training run. She was strapped to a backboard and placed on a stretcher though her arms were moving. Stramuraru's sister Raluca, who had completed her run before her sister and made it through without issue, rushed to the end of the observation deck to see if she was okay as the public address announcer directed medical personnel to the scene. American Sweeney, sliding after Violeta, went airborne prior to the final curve and crashed though she walked away shaken up. Violeta later withdrew prior to the event while Raluca would finish 21st.

Yasuda was disqualified after the first run after her post-competition weigh in for having too heavy a sled. Her sled weighed 13.3 kg (29.3 lb) when the maximum allowed by the FIL is 13.1 kg (28.9 lb) Romania's Chiras crashed out during the second run, the only crash during the actual competition. Šišajová caused a sensation when she went airborne during the fourth run on Turn 13 though she managed to stay on her sled. Prior to her fourth run, Hüfner took a nap to ease her nervousness. Geisenberger's final run was delayed when a track-side photographer accidentally set off a water hose.

Defending World Champion Hamlin finished a disappointing 16th. Hüfner followed up her bronze at the 2006 Winter Olympics with gold in this Olympics. Reithmeyer, who finished eighth at Turin, earned her best career finish and became the first non-German to medal in this event at the Winter Olympics since fellow Austrian Angelika Neuner won bronze at Nagano in 1998. Defending European champion Ivanova finished fourth on her 19th birthday. The margin of victory was the largest since 1994.

Two-time Olympic champion Otto commented to Reuters that "Tatti (Hüfner's nickname) is a very strong slider and still relatively young so she could achieve what I did and win this again."

Canada's Gough commented on the 14th in the wake of Kumaritashvili's death two days earlier that "We’ve got the world championships here in a few years (2013) so hopefully we can actually have a race." instead of the start at the Junior start house.

Time listed at top in italics is start time while time below is the track time. SR - Start Record. TR - Track Record. Top finishes in both times are in boldface.

Rank	Bib	Athlete	Country	Run 1	Run 2	Run 3	Run 4	Total	Behind
1st place, gold medalist(s)	6	Tatjana Hüfner	Germany	8.437; 41.760	8.370; **41.481**	8.377; **41.666**	**8.363**; **41.617**	2:46.524	0.000
2nd place, silver medalist(s)	2	Nina Reithmayer	Austria	8.413; **41.728**	8.403; 41.563	8.448; 41.884	8.458; 41.839	2:47.014	+0.490
3rd place, bronze medalist(s)	10	Natalie Geisenberger	Germany	**8.410**; 41.743	8.383; 41.657	**8.372**; 41.800	8.401; 41.901	2:47.101	+0.577
4	23	Tatiana Ivanova	Russia	8.417; 41.816	8.377; 41.601	8.406; 41.914	8.395; 41.850	2:47.181	+0.657
5	9	Anke Wischnewski	Germany	8.431; 41.785	8.406; 41.685	8.452; 41.894	8.429; 41.889	2:47.253	+0.729
6	8	Alexandra Rodionova	Russia	8.416; 41.828	8.420; 41.731	8.434; 41.984	8.446; 41.913	2:47.456	+0.932
7	3	Martina Kocher	Switzerland	8.449; 42.005	**8.357**; 41.697	8.412; 41.976	8.405; 41.897	2:47.575	+1.051
8	29	Ewelina Staszulonek	Poland	8.521; 41.975	8.506; 41.816	8.504; 41.948	8.517; 41.882	2:47.621	+1.097
9	16	Maija Tīruma	Latvia	8.465; 41.773	8.518; 41.933	8.501; 42.012	8.471; 41.936	2:47.654	+1.130
10	24	Natalia Khoreva	Russia	8.444; 41.932	8.427; 41.785	8.464; 42.175	8.442; 42.092	2:47.984	+1.460
11	1	Natalya Yakuchenko	Ukraine	8.478; 42.119	8.473; 41.809	8.539; 42.132	8.489; 42.026	2:48.086	+1.562
12	7	Veronika Halder	Austria	8.570; 42.015	8.574; 41.881	8.563; 42.078	8.615; 42.143	2:48.117	+1.593
13	26	Anna Orlova	Latvia	8.512; 41.998	8.546; 41.947	8.569; 42.260	8.531; 42.100	2:48.305	+1.781
14	17	Veronika Sabolová	Slovakia	8.463; 41.999	8.488; 41.925	8.588; 42.563	8.482; 42.055	2:48.542	+2.018
15	13	Regan Lauscher	Canada	8.700; 42.368	8.670; 42.289	8.564; 42.211	8.546; 42.153	2:49.021	+2.497
16	11	Erin Hamlin	United States	8.461; 41.835	8.640; 42.219	8.826; 42.792	8.661; 42.262	2:49.108	+2.584
17	12	Julia Clukey	United States	8.456; 42.059	8.546; 42.075	8.615; 42.472	8.756; 42.754	2:49.360	+2.836
18	5	Alex Gough	Canada	8.711; 42.275	8.775; 42.411	8.636; 42.346	8.673; 42.359	2:49.391	+2.867
19	15	Liliya Ludan	Ukraine	8.660; 42.312	8.650; 42.302	8.699; 42.477	8.669; 42.364	2:49.455	+2.931
20	14	Sandra Gasparini	Italy	8.540; 42.339	8.550; 42.161	8.733; 42.881	8.676; 42.621	2:50.002	+3.478
21	22	Raluca Strămăturaru	Romania	8.593; 42.475	8.603; 42.198	8.631; 42.815	8.631; 42.584	2:50.072	+3.548
22	4	Megan Sweeney	United States	8.623; 42.450	8.717; 42.690	8.647; 42.625	8.683; 42.450	2:50.215	+3.691
23	28	Hannah Campbell-Pegg	Australia	8.670; 42.527	8.679; 42.570	8.663; 42.606	8.633; 42.519	2:50.222	+3.698
24	27	Agnese Koklaca	Latvia	8.541; 42.627	8.578; 42.334	8.593; 43.091	8.595; 42.336	2:50.388	+3.864
25	20	Meaghan Simister	Canada	8.663; 42.524	8.658; 42.497	8.703; 42.787	8.697; 42.662	2:50.470	+3.946
26	18	Madoka Harada	Japan	8.716; 42.608	8.594; 42.112	8.674; 42.572	8.920; 43.188	2:50.480	+3.956
27	19	Jana Šišajová	Slovakia	8.610; 42.297	8.560; 42.172	8.630; 42.529	8.645; 48.101	2:55.099	+8.575
	25	Mihaela Chiras	Romania	8.692; 43.494	8.615; DNF			DNF	
	21	Aya Yasuda	Japan					DSQ	
