= Asian Luge Cup =

Annual luge competition

Asian Luge Championship (Asian Luge Cup before 2015) is annual luge competition for Asian countries, which held since 1998. There are men's and women's single events and men's double event. Most part of editions of Asian Luge Championship held by Spiral track at Nagano, Japan.

The first Asian Luge Championship was held in conjunction with the 1st Continental Cup in Pyeongchang, South Korea, from December 18 to 21, 2019, according to the International Luge Federation. The event took place at the Alpensia Sliding Centre, which had previously hosted luge events during the 2018 Winter Olympics, according to the International Luge Federation.

The 9th Asian Luge Championships (9th Asian LUGE Championships & 3rd Youth A Continental Cup) were held in Pyeongchang, South Korea, on December 2, 2023. The event was co-hosted with the 3rd Youth A Continental Cup. The championships served as a qualifier for the 2024 Winter Youth Olympic Games in Gangwon, South Korea.

== Host cities ==
- 1998–2016: Nagano, Japan
- 2017: Altenberg, Germany
- 2018–2021: Not held
- 2022: Pyeongchang, South Korea

== Men's singles ==
=== Asian Cup ===
Games	Gold	Silver	Bronze
1998	Shigeaki Ushijima (JPN)	Goro Hyashybe (JPN)	Takahisa Oguchi (JPN)
1999	Shigeaki Ushijima (JPN)	Goro Hyashybe (JPN)	Takahisa Oguchi (JPN)
2000	Goro Hyashybe (JPN)	Shigeaki Ushijima (JPN)	Takahisa Oguchi (JPN)
2001	Shigeaki Ushijima (JPN)	Goro Hyashybe (JPN)	Yuki Sumizawa (JPN)
2002	Shigeaki Ushijima (JPN)	Takahisa Oguchi (JPN)	Goro Hyashybe (JPN)
2003	Takahisa Oguchi (JPN)	Shigeaki Ushijima (JPN)	Yuki Sumizawa (JPN)
2004	Takahisa Oguchi (JPN)	Shigeaki Ushijima (JPN)	Goro Hyashybe (JPN)
2005	Shigeaki Ushijima (JPN)	Takahisa Oguchi (JPN)	Shiva Keshavan (IND)
2005	Shigeaki Ushijima (JPN)	Takahisa Oguchi (JPN)	Shiva Keshavan (IND)
2006	Shigeaki Ushijima (JPN)	Takahisa Oguchi (JPN)	Yuki Sumizawa (JPN)
2007	Shigeaki Ushijima (JPN)	Yuki Sumizawa (JPN)	Yohan Yamaura (JPN)
2008	Takahisa Oguchi (JPN)	Yohan Yamaura (JPN)	Shiva Keshavan (IND)
2009	Takahisa Oguchi (JPN)	Shiva Keshavan (IND)	Yohan Yamaura (JPN)
2010	Hidenari Kanayama (JPN)	Takahisa Oguchi (JPN)	Yohan Yamaura (JPN)
2011	Shiva Keshavan (IND)	Takahisa Oguchi (JPN)	Yohan Yamaura (JPN)
2012	Shiva Keshavan (IND)	Hidenari Kanayama (JPN)	Takahisa Oguchi (JPN)
2013	Hidenari Kanayama (JPN)	Shiva Keshavan (IND)	Kim Dong-hyeon (KOR)
2014	Hidenari Kanayama (JPN)	Shiva Keshavan (IND)	Kim Dong-hyeon (KOR)

=== Asian Luge Championship ===
Games	Gold	Silver	Bronze
2015	Hidenari Kanayama (JPN)	Shiva Keshavan (IND)	Kim Dong-hyeon (KOR)
2016	Shiva Keshavan (IND)	Shohei Tanaka (JPN)	Lien Te-An (TPE)
2017	Shiva Keshavan (IND)	Lien Te-An (TPE)	Kang Doung Kyu (KOR)
2018	Shiva Keshavan (IND)	Lien Te-An (TPE)	Kang Doung Kyu (KOR)
2018–2021	Not held		
2022	Seiya Kobayasi (JPN)	Li Jing (CHN)	Liu Shaonan (CHN)

== Women's singles ==
=== Asian Cup ===
Games	Gold	Silver	Bronze
1998	Yumie Kobayashi (JPN)	Shino Yangisawa (JPN)	Nana Matsuzaka (JPN)
1999	Yumie Kobayashi (JPN)	Aya Yasuda (JPN)	Kasumi Shibata (JPN)
2000	Yumie Kobayashi (JPN)	Shino Yangisawa (JPN)	Rumi Tamura (JPN)
2001	Yumie Kobayashi (JPN)	Rumi Tamura (JPN)	Shino Yangisawa (JPN)
2002	Aya Yasuda (JPN)	Madoka Harada (JPN)	Rumi Tamura (JPN)
2003	Aya Yasuda (JPN)	Madoka Harada (JPN)	Yuko Arai (JPN)
2004	Madoka Harada (JPN)	Aya Yasuda (JPN)	—
2005	Madoka Harada (JPN)	Aya Yasuda (JPN)	—
2006	Madoka Harada (JPN)	Aya Yasuda (JPN)	—
2007	Madoka Harada (JPN)	Aya Yasuda (JPN)	Kanon Yamura (JPN)
2008	Madoka Harada (JPN)	Aya Yasuda (JPN)	Kanon Yamura (JPN)
2009	Aya Yasuda (JPN)	Madoka Harada (JPN)	Kanon Yamura (JPN)
2010	Madoka Harada (JPN)	Aya Yasuda (JPN)	Tomono Taguchi (JPN)
2011	Madoka Harada (JPN)	Choi Eun-Ju (KOR)	Makiko Kuno (JPN)
2012	Madoka Harada (JPN)	Choi Eun-Ju (KOR)	Makiko Kuno (JPN)
2013	Choi Eun-Ju (KOR)	Madoka Harada (JPN)	Sung Eun-Ryung (KOR)
2014	Sung Eun-Ryung (KOR)	Choi Eun-Ju (KOR)	Madoka Hoshina (JPN)

=== Asian Luge Championship ===
Games	Gold	Silver	Bronze
2015	Choi Eun-Ju (KOR)	Sung Eun-Ryung (KOR)	—
2016	Not held		
2017	Sung Eun-Ryung (KOR)	Anastassiya Bogacheva (KAZ)	Choi Eun-Ju (KOR)
2018–2021	Not held		
2022	Wang Jiaxue (CHN)	Zhou Liangztting (CHN)	Zhao Jiaying (CHN)
