= Luge at the 2010 Winter Olympics =

Luge at the XXI Olympic Winter Games
- Venue: Whistler Sliding Centre, Whistler, British Columbia, Canada
- Dates: 13–17 February 2010
- No. of events: 3
- Competitors: 108 from 25 nations

The luge competition events of the 2010 Winter Olympics were held between 13 and 17 February 2010 at the Whistler Sliding Centre in Whistler, British Columbia, Canada.

== Medal summary ==
=== Medal table ===
Rank	Nation	Gold	Silver	Bronze	Total
1	Germany	2	1	2	5
2	Austria	1	1	0	2
3	Latvia	0	1	0	1
4	Italy	0	0	1	1
Totals (4 entries)		3	3	3	9

=== Events ===
Three luge events were held at the games:

Event	Gold	Silver	Bronze
Men's singles	Felix Loch; Germany 3:13.085	David Möller; Germany 3:13.764	Armin Zöggeler; Italy 3:14.375
Women's singles	Tatjana Hüfner; Germany 2:46.524	Nina Reithmayer; Austria 2:47.014	Natalie Geisenberger; Germany 2:47.101
Doubles	Austria; Andreas Linger; Wolfgang Linger 1:22.705	Latvia; Andris Šics; Juris Šics 1:22.969	Germany; Patric Leitner; Alexander Resch 1:23.040

== Competition schedule ==
All times are Pacific Standard Time (UTC-8).

Day	Date	Start	Finish	Event	Phase
Day 2	Saturday, 13 February 2010	17:00	20:35	men	heats 1 and 2
Day 3	Sunday, 14 February 2010	13:00	16:50	men	heats 3 and 4
Day 4	Monday, 15 February 2010	17:00	19:55	women	heats 1 and 2
Day 5	Tuesday, 16 February 2010	13:00	16:10	women	heats 3 and 4
Day 6	Wednesday, 17 February 2010	17:00	19:15	doubles	heats 1 and 2

== Qualifying ==
=== Athlete/NOC quota ===
In accordance with the International Olympic Committee and the International Luge Federation (FIL), 110 athletes were to be allowed to take part. This was to include 40 athletes for men's singles, 30 athletes for women's singles, and 20 doubles teams (40 athletes total). The 110-athlete maximum was set for the 2002 Winter Olympics in Salt Lake City, Utah, United States, and repeated for the 2006 Winter Olympics in Turin, Italy. Each NOC could enter up to 10 athletes (3 men's single, 3 women's single and 2 doubles).

=== Qualification system ===
Athletes were to be ranked by the number of world cup points they earned in the 2008–09 season and through the first half (before 31 December) of the 2009–10 season. To be eligible, athletes must either have earned medals and the world cup points in five World Cups, Nations Cup or Junior World Cup, or have a top-30 (men's single), top-20 (women's single) or top-16 (doubles) finish at the world cup during the qualification period. The top-40 men's single, top-30 women's single and top-20 doubles sleds were to be qualified for the Olympics, with unused quotas to be redistributed with priority given to unrepresented nations. The host nation (Canada) was to be guaranteed a sled in every event provided that they reached the minimum requirements.

=== Final quotas ===
Nations	Men	Women	Doubles	Total athletes
Argentina	1	0	0	1
Australia	0	1	0	1
Austria	3	2	2	9
Bulgaria	2	0	0	2
Canada	3	3	2	10
Czech Republic	2	0	1	4
France	1	0	0	1
Great Britain	1	0	0	1
Georgia	2*	0	0	1
Germany	3	3	2	10
India	1	0	0	1
Italy	3	1	2	8
Japan	1	2	0	3
South Korea	1	0	0	1
Latvia	3	3	2	10
Moldova	1	0	0	1
Poland	1	1	0	2
Romania	1	2+	2	7
Russia	3	3	2	10
Slovenia	1	0	0	1
Switzerland	1	1	0	2
Slovakia	1	2	1	5
Chinese Taipei	1	0	0	1
Ukraine	0	2	2	6
United States	3	3	2	10
Total: 25 NOCs	39	29	20	108

*Georgian luger Nodar Kumaritashvili died during training, and teammate Levan Gureshidze withdrew.
+Romanian luger Violeta Strămăturaru withdrew following a concussion sustained during training.

== Jury selection ==
On 15 June 2009, the FIL announced their jury members for the 2010 Winter Olympics. The jury was to be headed by Josef Benz (Switzerland, chair of the FIL Sport Commission. Other jury members included Zianbeth Shattuck-Owen (United States), luge manager for the 2002 Games, and Markus Schmidt (Austria), men's singles bronze medalist at the 1992 Winter Olympics in Albertville, France. Technical Delegate Executive Board consists of Björn Drydahl (Norway), Marie-Luise Rainer (Italy) and Walter Corey (Canada).

== Doping control ==
On 21 July 2009, the FIL announced that blood doping controls would take place at the Olympics for the first time. FIL President Josef Fendt stated during the 57th Congress in Liberec, Czech Republic, that no positive test had occurred during the Viessmann World Cup or FIL ...[ European and World]... events despite the random testing done by the World Anti-Doping Agency. The last two doping offenses that occurred in the FIL to cannabis abuse and both athletes were punished by their national federations.

== Fatality ==
The Whistler Sliding Centre is acknowledged as the fastest track in the world and has a reputation of the most dangerous one. In the build-up to the games several teams had raised concerns about the safety of athletes. An FIL spokesman said on 12 February that there had been 2,500 runs with only a three-percent crash rate. However, a week prior to the incident athletes were remarking on the speed and technical difficulty of the 1,400 m (4,600 ft) track. Several minor accidents occurred on the track during training runs leading up to the start of the games.

During a training session on 12 February, the Georgian luger Nodar Kumaritashvili died of injuries caused by a crash in the final turn of the course at speeds of 144.3 kilometres per hour (89.7 mph), crashing into the side of the turn, sending him crashing into a steel support pillar. The FIL immediately called an emergency meeting after the incident, and all other training runs were called off for the day.

Investigations were conducted the same day, concluding that the accident was not caused by deficiencies in the track. As a preventative measure, the walls at the exit of curve 16 will be raised and a change in the ice profile will be made. A joint statement was issued by the FIL, the International Olympic Committee (IOC), and the Vancouver Organizing Committee (VANOC) over Kumaritashvili's death with training suspended for the rest of that day. According to the Coroners Service of British Columbia and the Royal Canadian Mounted Police (RCMP), the cause was to Kumaritashvili coming out of turn 15 late and not compensating for turn 16. Because of this fatality, an extra 100 ft (30 m) of wall was added after the end of Turn 16 and the ice profile was changed. It also moved the men's singles luge event from its starthouse to the one for both the women's singles and men's doubles event. Kumaritashvili is the first Olympic athlete to die at the Winter Olympics in training since 1992 and the first luger to die in a practice event at the Winter Olympics since Kazimierz Kay-Skrzypeski of Great Britain was killed at the luge track used for the 1964 Winter Olympics in Innsbruck. It was also luge's first fatality since 10 December 1975 when an Italian luger was killed.

The women's singles and men's doubles start was moved to the Junior start house of the track, located after turn 5. Germany's Natalie Geisenberger complained that it was not a women's start but more of a kinder ("child" in German) start. Her teammate Tatjana Hüfner who had the fastest speed on two runs of 82.3 mph (132.4 km/h) stated that the new start position "..does not help good starters like myself". American Erin Hamlin stated the track was still demanding even after the distance was lessened from 1,193 to 953 m (3,914 to 3,127 ft) and that athletes were still hitting 80 mph (130 km/h).

During a 14 February 2010 interview with Yahoo! Sports, FIL Secretary-General Svein Romstad stated that the federation considered cancelling the luge competition in the wake of Kumaritashvili's death two days earlier. Romstad stated that "[Kumaritashvili] ... made a mistake" on the crash, but also stated that "...any fatality is unnacceptable". Additionally, Romstad stated that the start houses were moved to their current locations "... mostly for an emotional reason". Because of Kumaritashvili's death, the FIL worked with the organizing committee for the 2014 Winter Olympics in Sochi over making the Sliding Center Sanki in Rzhanaya Polyana slower.

Despite the changes, and celebrations by the victorious athletes, Kumaritashvili's death overshadowed the race. Some athletes who participated in the competition said they were scared during their runs, and welcomed the track changes. Others criticized the changes as having given an advantage to stronger starters like the German participants, as opposed to weaker starters who would have benefited from having a longer course. Argentina's Ruben Gonzalez said, "God blessed the Germans today."

However, media reports mentioned the changes positively after a doubles team, Austria's Tobias and Markus Schiegl, crashed in the same turn where Kumaritashvili was killed. Both of them emerged unhurt.

On 18 February 2010, FIL President Josef Fendt issued the following statement:

"At the conclusion of the luge competition at the Vancouver 2010 Olympic Games, our thoughts are with the family of Nodar Kumaritashvili. We again offer our heartfelt condolences to them, to his friends and to the entire Georgian Luge Federation. Nodar Kumaritashvili will forever stay in the hearts of all the members of the Luge family.
This has also been a difficult time for the Olympic athletes who competed in these Games. Their solidarity and sportsmanship was a tribute to the friend we lost. The International Luge Federation is touched by the outpouring of compassion and sympathy from people around the world. We will leave Whistler determined to do all we can to prevent a recurrence of this tragic event."

During the ten actual competitive runs (four men single, four women single, and two doubles), there was only one crash which was Romania's Mihaela Chiras during the second run of the women's singles event. 12,000 spectators attended each of the five days of luge competition.

On 23 March 2010, FIL President Fendt, VANOC President John Furlong, 2010 men's singles gold medalist Felix Loch of Germany visited Kumaritashvili's grave in his hometown of Bakuriani to pay respects as part of tradition in the Georgian Orthodox Church.

The FIL published their reports in regards to Kumaritashvili's death following the FIL Commissions Meeting in St. Leonhard, in Graz, Austria, for both sport and technical commissions on 9–11 April 2010. This report was prepared by Romstad and Claire DelNegro, Vice-President Sport Artificial Track, who is from the United States.

== Television ratings ==
Ratings in Germany for the luge events had six million viewers for the women's singles luge events, generating a 25.6 percent share and a 34 ranking according to ARD and ZDF. The last run of the men's singles event had a share of 30.3 percent (1.82 million viewers) while the third run of the event had been watched by 5.32 million viewers (17.1 percent market share). Despite being broadcast in the middle of the night in Germany, the doubles event had a 22.6 percent market share.
