= Luge at the 1998 Winter Olympics – Women's singles =

Women's singles at the XVIII Olympic Winter Games
- Venue: Spiral
- Dates: 10–11 February 1998
- Competitors: 29 from 15 nations
- Winning time: 3:18.436

Medalists
1st place, gold medalist(s)		Silke Kraushaar	Germany
2nd place, silver medalist(s)		Barbara Niedernhuber	Germany
3rd place, bronze medalist(s)		Angelika Neuner	Austria

The Women's singles luge competition at the 1998 Winter Olympics in Nagano was held on 10 and 11 February, at Spiral.

== Results ==
Rank	Athlete	Country	Run 1	Run 2	Run 3	Run 4	Total
1st place, gold medalist(s)	Silke Kraushaar	Germany	51.197	51.178	50.787	50.617	3:23.779
2nd place, silver medalist(s)	Barbara Niedernhuber	Germany	51.216	51.103	50.837	50.625	3:23.781
3rd place, bronze medalist(s)	Angelika Neuner	Austria	51.417	51.286	50.945	50.605	3:24.253
4	Susi Erdmann	Germany	51.475	51.348	50.895	50.731	3:24.449
5	Andrea Tagwerker	Austria	51.518	51.335	50.990	50.648	3:24.491
6	Erin Warren	United States	51.644	51.461	51.364	50.859	3:25.328
7	Cammy Myler	United States	51.795	51.654	51.219	50.807	3:25.475
8	Bethany Calcaterra-McMahon	United States	51.696	51.651	51.296	50.915	3:25.558
9	Gerda Weissensteiner	Italy	51.744	51.998	51.415	50.956	3:26.113
10	Sonja Manzenreiter	Austria	51.892	51.828	51.369	51.183	3:26.272
11	Nataliya Yakushenko	Ukraine	52.014	51.746	51.511	51.277	3:26.548
12	Natalie Obkircher	Italy	51.910	51.967	51.530	51.270	3:26.677
13	Anna Orlova	Latvia	52.199	51.772	51.642	51.350	3:26.963
14	Iluta Gaile	Latvia	52.157	52.016	51.516	51.292	3:26.981
15	Mária Jasenčáková	Slovakia	52.006	52.336	51.721	51.302	3:27.365
16	Liliya Ludan	Ukraine	52.213	52.087	51.815	51.596	3:27.711
17	Margarita Klimenko	Russia	52.391	52.123	51.789	51.448	3:27.751
18	Irina Gubkina	Russia	52.295	52.199	52.107	51.514	3:28.115
19	Angie Paul	New Zealand	52.534	52.254	51.870	51.808	3:28.466
20	Helen Novikov	Estonia	52.760	52.594	52.204	51.705	3:29.263
21	Eriko Yamada	Japan	53.494	53.015	51.595	51.319	3:29.423
22	Jurita Šnitko	Latvia	52.921	52.638	52.347	51.801	3:29.707
23	Shino Yanagisawa	Japan	52.762	52.706	52.243	52.123	3:29.834
24	Anne Abernathy	Virgin Islands	53.224	52.652	52.525	52.306	3:30.707
25	Yumie Kobayashi	Japan	52.829	53.025	52.198	52.718	3:30.770
26	Doris Preindl	Italy	52.178	52.107	51.638	55.373	3:31.296
27	Corina Drăgan-Terecoasa	Romania	53.653	53.329	52.714	52.542	3:32.238
28	Iginia Boccalandro	Venezuela	54.232	53.962	54.133	56.990	3:39.317
29	Lee Yi-fang	Chinese Taipei	55.052	55.217	56.648	53.117	3:40.034
