= Katsuya =

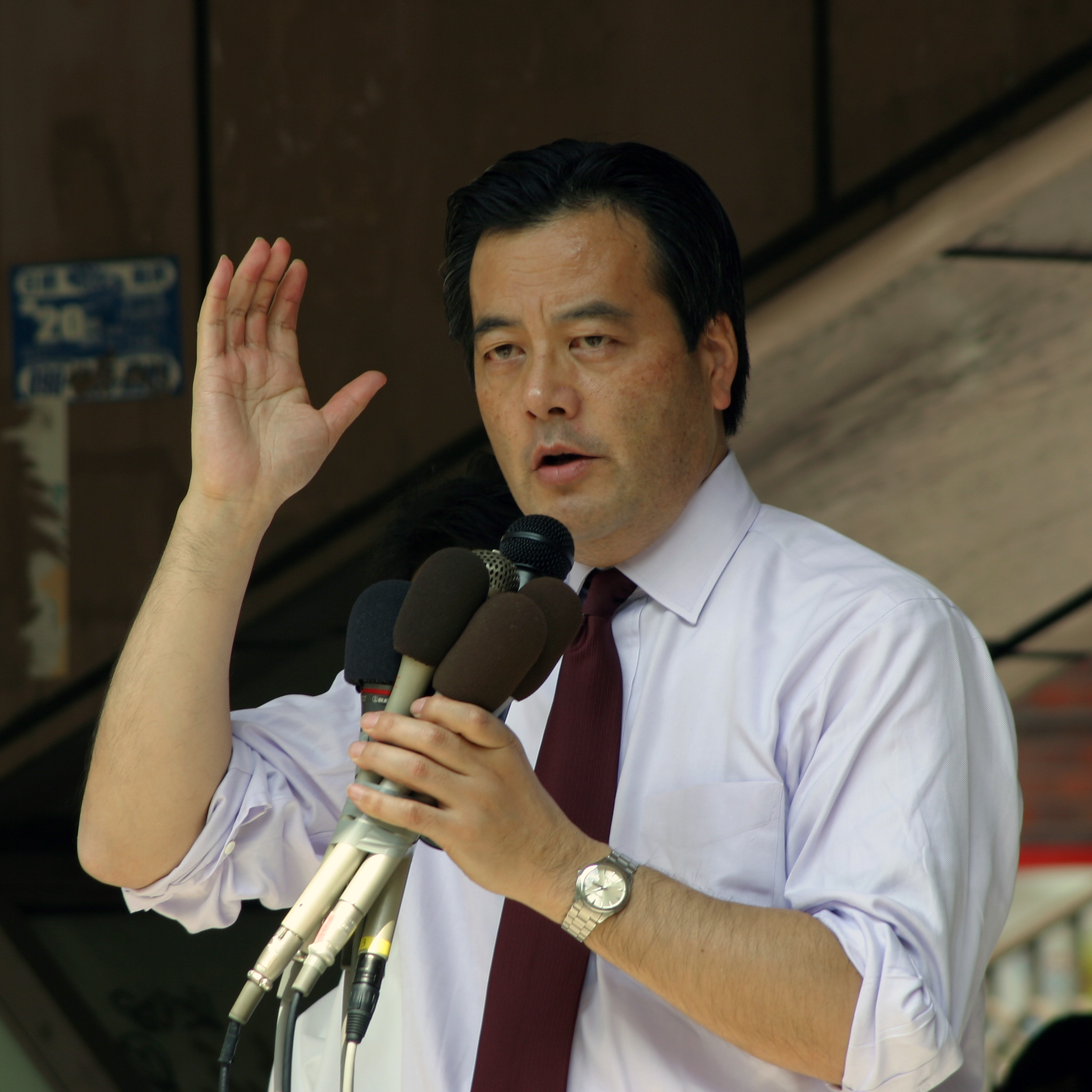
- Katsuya Okada, a Japanese politician and Secretary-General of the Democratic Party of Japan
- Pronunciation: Ka-tsu-ya
- Gender: Male

Origin
- Origin: Japanese
- Meaning: Different meanings depending on the kanji used
- Region of origin: Japan

Katsuya (カツヤ, かつや) is both a masculine Japanese given name and a Japanese surname.

== Written forms ==
- 克也, "achieve, to be"
- 克弥, "achieve, extensive, complete"
- 勝也, "win, to be"
- 勝矢, "win, arrow"
- 勝哉, "win, how"
- 勝夜, "win, night"
- 活耶, "active, father"
- 活弥, "active, extensive, complete"
- 轄也, "administer, control, to be"
- 担耶, "carry, bear, father"

== People with the given name ==
- Katsuya Eda (江田 勝哉), Japanese mathematician
- Katsuya Eguchi (江口 勝也; born 1965), Japanese video game designer
- Katsuya Ishihara (石原 克哉; born 1978), Japanese footballer
- Katsuya Kakunaka (角中 勝也; born 1987), Japanese baseball player
- Katsuya Kitamura (北村 克哉; born 1985), Japanese wrestler
- Katsuya Kobayashi (小林 且弥; born 1981), Japanese actor
- Katsuya Kodama (児玉 克哉; born 1959), Japanese sociologist
- Katsuya Kondō (近藤 勝也; born 1963), Japanese manga artist, character designer, animator and animation director
- Katsuya Iwatake (岩武 克弥; born 1996), Japanese football player
- Katsuya Matsumura (松村 克弥; born 1963), Japanese film director and screenwriter
- Katsuya Miyahira (宮平 勝哉; 1918–2010), Japanese karateka
- Katsuya Nagato (永戸 勝也; born 1995), Japanese football player
- Katsuya Nakamoto (中元 勝也; born 1977), Japanese freestyle skier
- Katsuya Nakano (中野 克哉; born 1996), Japanese footballer
- Katsuya Nomura (野村 克也; 1935-2020), Japanese baseball player
- Katsuya Ogawa (小川 勝也; born 1963), Japanese politician
- Katsuya Okada (岡田 克也; born 1953), Japanese politician
- Katsuya Onizuka (鬼塚 勝也; born 1970), Japanese boxer
- Katsuya Saito (斎藤 勝也; born 1940), Japanese cyclist
- Katsuya Tahara (田原 勝也; born 1972), Japanese snowboarder
- Katsuya Takasu (高須 克弥; born 1945), Japanese plastic surgeon
- Katsuya Terada (寺田 克也; born 1963), Japanese illustrator
- Katsuya Toida (戸井田 カツヤ; born 1967), Japanese mixed martial artist
- Katsuya Toyama (當山 克也; born 1967), Japanese sprint canoeist
- Katsuya Yokoyama (横山 勝也; 1934–2010), Japanese musician
- Katsuya Uechi (1959–2026), Japanese chef

== People with the surname ==
- Katsuya (勝矢; born 1975), Japanese actor
- Kentarō Katsuya (勝矢 剣太郎; fl. 1927–1933), Japanese writer
- Masahiko Katsuya (勝谷 誠彦; 1960–2018), Japanese journalist
- Toshinobu Katsuya (勝矢 寿延; born 1961), Japanese footballer

== Fictional characters ==
- Katsuya Jounouchi (城之内 克也), a character from Yu-Gi-Oh!
- Katsuya Serizawa (芹沢 克也), a character in the manga series Mob Psycho 100
