= Preindl =

Preindl is a surname. Notable people with the surname include:

- Doris Preindl (born 1977), Italian luger
- Ferdinand Preindl (1912–1998), Austrian speed skater
