= Sekiya =

Sekiya is a surname. Notable people with the surname include:

- Sekiya Seikei (1855–1896), Japanese geologist and seismologists
- Masanori Sekiya (born 1949), racing car driver, Le Mans winner
- Ryōichi Sekiya (born 1967), Japanese ultramarathon and marathon runner
- Ryota Sekiya (born 1991), former Nippon Professional Baseball player
- Shuichi Sekiya (born 1969), Japanese biathlete
- Toshiko Sekiya (1904–1941), Japanese singer, composer

== See also ==
- Sekiya Kinen, a 1600m horse race for Thoroughbreds aged three and over
- Keisei Sekiya Station, a railway station on the Keisei Main Line in Adachi, Tokyo, Japan
- Sekiya Station (Nara), a railway station in Kashiba, Nara Prefecture, Japan
- Sekiya Station (Niigata), a train station in Chūō-ku, Niigata, Niigata Prefecture, Japan
