= Freestyle skiing at the 2002 Winter Olympics – Men's moguls =

Men's moguls at the XIX Olympic Winter Games
- Venue: Park City
- Dates: 12 February
- Competitors: 30 from 12 nations
- Winning score: 27,97

Medalists
1st place, gold medalist(s)		Janne Lahtela	Finland
2nd place, silver medalist(s)		Travis Mayer	United States
3rd place, bronze medalist(s)		Richard Gay	France

The men's moguls event in freestyle skiing at the 2002 Winter Olympics in Salt Lake City, United States took place on 12 February at Park City.

== Results ==
=== Qualification ===
The qualification was held at 09:00, with 30 skiers competing. The top 16 advanced to the final.

Rank	Name	Country	Score	Notes
1	Travis Mayer	United States	27.05	Q
2	Janne Lahtela	Finland	26.92	Q
3	Mikko Ronkainen	Finland	26.25	Q
4	Jeremy Bloom	United States	25.98	Q
5	Richard Gay	France	25.86	Q
6	Ryan Johnson	Canada	25.60	Q
7	Stéphane Rochon	Canada	25.57	Q
8	Sami Mustonen	Finland	25.42	Q
9	Yugo Tsukita	Japan	25.33	Q
10	Scott Bellavance	Canada	25.14	Q
11	Jonny Moseley	United States	25.13	Q
12	Johann Grégoire	France	24.97	Q
13	Cédric Regnier-Lafforgue	France	24.87	Q
14	Fredrik Fortkord	Sweden	24.81	Q
15	Tapio Luusua	Finland	24.56	Q
16	Laurent Niol	France	24.46	Q
17	Vitali Glushchenko	Russia	24.20	
18	Adrian Costa	Australia	24.13	
19	Christian Stohr	Switzerland	24.03	
20	Kenro Shimoyama	Japan	23.39	
21	Jean-Luc Brassard	Canada	23.31	
22	Patrik Sundberg	Sweden	23.16	
23	Trennon Paynter	Australia	22.53	
24	Aleksey Bannikov	Kazakhstan	22.14	
25	Simone Galli	Italy	21.01	
26	Katsuya Nakamoto	Japan	20.56	
27	Vladimir Tyumentsev	Russia	18.42	
28	Evan Dybvig	United States	9.96	
29	Sam Temple	Great Britain	9.03	
30	Teppei Noda	Japan	0.30	

=== Final ===
The final was held at 12:00, with Janne Lahtela, the second-best qualifier, just beating top qualifier Travis Mayer for the gold medal. The final wasn't without controversy however as Moseley's "dinner roll" was scored as a 360 with a break of form. Following the event FIS updated its scoring system making changes which if done earlier would have resulted in Moseley winning the gold medal.

Rank	Athlete	Score
Gold medal	Janne Lahtela (FIN)	27.97
Silver medal	Travis Mayer (USA)	27.59
Bronze medal	Richard Gay (FRA)	26.91
4	Jonny Moseley (USA)	26.78
5	Tapio Luusua (FIN)	26.67
6	Scott Bellavance (CAN)	26.55
7	Ryan Johnson (CAN)	26.55
8	Mikko Ronkainen (FIN)	26.49
9	Jeremy Bloom (USA)	26.19
10	Sami Mustonen (FIN)	26.08
11	Cédric Regnier-Lafforgue (FRA)	25.63
12	Laurent Niol (FRA)	25.00
13	Fredrik Fortkord (SWE)	24.89
14	Johann Grégoire (FRA)	22.77
15	Stéphane Rochon (CAN)	19.80
16	Yugo Tsukita (JPN)	15.81
