= Teppei =

- Gender: Male

Origin
- Origin: Japanese
- Meaning: Different meanings depending on the kanji used

Teppei (written: 鉄平, 徹平, 哲平 or 哲兵) is a masculine Japanese given name. Notable people with the name include:

- Teppei Arita (有田 哲平; born 1971), Japanese comedian and television presenter
- Teppei Koike (小池 徹平) (born 1986), Japanese actor and singer
- Teppei Nishiyama (西山 哲平) (born 1975), Japanese footballer
- Teppei Noda (野田 鉄平; born 1977), Japanese freestyle skier
- Teppei Takano (高野 鉄平) (born 1983), Japanese ski jumper
- Teppei Teranishi (born 1980), American musician
- Teppei Tomioka (冨岡 鉄平) (born 1977), Japanese rugby union player
- Teppei Uchida (内田 哲兵) (born 1975), Japanese footballer
- Teppei Usui (碓井 鉄平) (born 1991), Japanese footballer
- Teppei (wrestler) (born 1976), Japanese professional wrestler
- Teppei Tsuchiya (born 1982), Japanese baseball player

== Fictional characters ==
- Teppei Arima (馬 哲平), protagonist of the visual novel Princess Lover!
- Teppei Hojo (北条 鉄平), antagonist in the visual novel series Higurashi When They Cry
- Teppei Iida (飯田哲平), character in the manga series Inubaka
- Teppei Kiyoshi (木吉 鉄平), character in the manga and anime series Kuroko's Basketball
- Teppei Kaneko, character in Pixelberry Studios' Choices: Stories You Play visual storytelling game, in the storyline "Ride or Die: A Bad Boy Romance"
