= Bert Isatitsch =

Bert Isatitsch (September 14, 1911 – February 8, 1994) was an Austrian educator who later became the first president of the International Luge Federation (FIL), serving from its 1957 establishment until his 1994 death.

== Education career ==
Born in Fürstenfeld, Isatitsch became a special education teacher in Rottenmann. He later became chair for all special education schools in his native Austria. Isatitsch would use his skills as an educator to bring leadership into the growth of luge as an International Olympic Committee (IOC)-recognized sport.

== Luge career ==
A lover of winter sports, Isatitsch defined the premises of luge when it was part of the "Section de Luge" within the Fédération Internationale de Bobsleigh et de Tobogganing (FIBT - International Bobsleigh and Tobogganing Federation) after World War II. Istatisch would serve as section president in the FIBT from 1948 to 1956. By 1952, he became chair of the Austrian Luge Federation, a position he also held until his death in 1994. Isatitsch's leadership would lead to the FIL (Federation Internationale de Luge de Course) being created in 1957 following its split from the FIBT in 1957. Luge replaced skeleton as a Winter Olympic discipline in 1954 (skeleton would return for the 2002 Winter Olympics in Salt Lake City), and was initially approved for inclusion at the 1960 Winter Olympics in Squaw Valley, but its inclusion was postponed until the 1964 Winter Olympics in Innsbruck because of the American Luge Federation's lack of Olympic experience as well as the 1960 Games organizers' unwillingness to construct a bobsleigh track. Natural track luge world championships would be added in 1979. He served until his sudden death on February 8, 1994. Josef Fendt of Germany succeeded Istatisch as president later that year.
