= Julia Clukey =

American luger

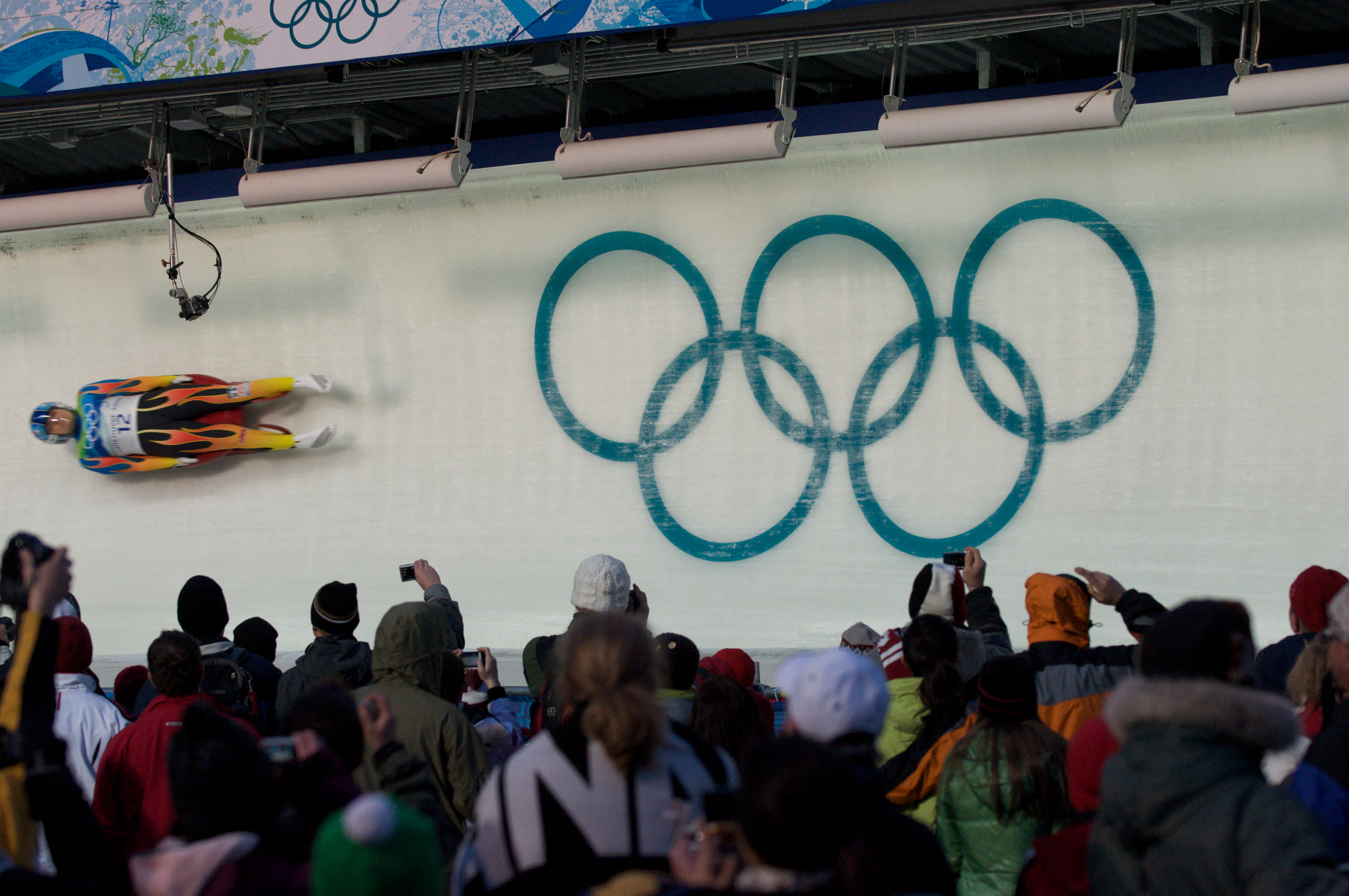
- Clukey at the 2010 Winter Olympics

Personal information
- Born: April 29, 1985 (age 41) Augusta, Maine, U.S.

Sport
- Country: United States
- Sport: Luge
- Event: Women's singles

Julia Clukey (born April 29, 1985, in Augusta, Maine) is an American luger who started competing in 2002. Her best Luge World Cup season finish was 12th in women's singles in 2007–08.

Clukey's best finish at the FIL World Luge Championships was fifth in women's singles at Lake Placid in 2009.

On 28 September 2009, Clukey underwent knee surgery in Saranac Lake, New York. She had to miss the World Cup event in Altenberg, Germany, to a neck injury incurred during training as posted on FIL's website on 3 December 2009, but was expected to be able to race in Lillehammer, Norway, the following week.

Despite her injuries, Clukey was selected in December 2009 to compete at the 2010 Winter Olympics in Vancouver, where she finished 17th.

In 2011, Clukey underwent brain surgery for Arnold Chiari Malformation.

Clukey is a spokesperson for the Maine Beer & Wine Distributors Association. She has partnered with the association of eight family-owned Maine distributors to be actively involved in their responsibility campaign.

Since 2010, Olympian Julia Clukey has recorded public service announcements and appeared on local television and radio shows to raise awareness about the importance of responsibility and good decision-making. As a motivational speaker, she has also presented at more than 30 Maine high schools about the importance of overcoming challenges and of good decision-making. Through her outreach, she has reached more than 9,000 Maine high school students.

As part of her commitment to give back to the community, she hosts a 10-day summer camp on Maranacook Lake in Readfield, Maine. Julia Clukey's Camp for Girls is designed for girls ages 8–12. The camp is made possible by the Kennebec Valley YMCA and the Maine Beer & Wine Distributors Association. The popular summer camp has attracted young girls from across Maine and as far away as New York.
