= Vladimir Tyumentsev =

Russian freestyle skier

Personal information
- Nationality: Russian
- Born: 13 February 1982 (age 43); Tomsk, Russia

Sport
- Sport: Freestyle skiing

Vladimir Tyumentsev (born 13 February 1982) is a Russian freestyle skier. He competed in the men's moguls event at the 2002 Winter Olympics.
