= Lithuanian Luge Federation =

Sports governing body in Lithuania

Lithuanian Luge Federation Lithuanian: Lietuvos rogučių sporto federacija
- Sport: Luge
- Category: National association
- Abbreviation: LRSF
- Founded: 11 December 2013
- Affiliation: ILF
- Affiliation date: 26 September 2014
- Headquarters: Vilnius, Lithuania
- Director: Igor Galperin

Lithuanian Luge Federation (Lithuanian: Lietuvos rogučių sporto federacija) is a national governing body of luge sport in Lithuania.

== History ==
Lithuanian Luge Federation was founded on 11 December 2013 at Vilnius, Lithuania.

On 26 September 2014 Lithuanian Luge Federation joined International Luge Federation as a provisional member.
