= Lee Yi-fang =

Taiwanese luger

Personal information
- Nationality: Taiwanese
- Born: 10 September 1976 (age 48)

Sport
- Sport: Luge

Lee Yi-fang (born 10 September 1976) is a Taiwanese luger. She competed in the women's singles event at the 1998 Winter Olympics.
