= Christian Stohr =

Swiss freestyle skier

Personal information
- Nationality: Swiss
- Born: 17 June 1977 (age 48) Engelberg, Switzerland

Sport
- Sport: Freestyle skiing

Christian Stohr (born 17 June 1977) is a Swiss freestyle skier. He competed in the men's moguls event at the 2002 Winter Olympics.
