= Trennon Paynter =

Canadian-Australian freestyle skier

Personal information
- Citizenship: Australia; Canada
- Born: 6 January 1970 (age 56) Sydney, Australia

Sport
- Sport: Freestyle skiing

Trennon Paynter (born 6 January 1970) is a Canadian and Australian freestyle skier and ski coach. He competed in the men's moguls event at the 2002 Winter Olympics, representing Australia. Since 2011, he has been head coach of the Canadian national halfpipe ski team.

== Competitive career ==
Paynter competed on the World Cup moguls circuit through the 1990s and early 2000s, for both the Canadian and Australian national teams, with eight top-ten finishes, including a career-high fifth place at Blackcomb in 1999. He placed ninth in moguls at the 1999 FIS Freestyle Ski World Championships in Meiringen, Switzerland. A pelvis injury sustained at a 2000 World Cup event in Deer Valley, Utah, sidelined him before he recovered to represent Australia at the 2002 Winter Olympics in Salt Lake City, finishing 23rd in moguls.

== Coaching career ==
Paynter was part of a group of skiers, led by Sarah Burke, that lobbied for halfpipe skiing's inclusion in the Winter Olympics; the discipline debuted at the 2014 Sochi Games. In 2005 he founded an independent Canadian halfpipe ski program prior to any national federation support, and coached Burke to victory in the inaugural women's halfpipe event at the 2005 FIS Freestyle World Ski Championships. The program was later absorbed into Freestyle Canada as the sport's official national team.

In May 2011, Paynter was named head coach of the Canadian national halfpipe ski team. Under his coaching, Canadian athletes have won medals at every Winter Olympics halfpipe skiing has been part of, including Mike Riddle's silver at the 2014 Games, Cassie Sharpe's gold medal at the 2018 Games, Sharpe's silver and Rachael Karker's bronze at the 2022 Games, and Brendan Mackay's bronze at the 2026 Games.

== Tribute to Sarah Burke ==
Paynter was a close friend and coach of Sarah Burke, a Canadian freeskier whose advocacy helped bring halfpipe skiing into the Olympic program; Burke died in 2012 following a training accident, two years before the discipline's Olympic debut. At the 2014 Sochi Olympics, after the International Olympic Committee ruled that athletes could not wear memorial stickers for Burke on their helmets, Paynter brought her ashes to Russia and scattered them at several sites, including the Sochi halfpipe itself and the summit at Rosa Khutor Extreme Park.

At the 2026 Milan Cortina Olympics, Paynter commissioned 200 pins reading "Sarah" in red script for athletes to wear in tribute; the pins were distributed among competitors within hours of being introduced.

== Personal life ==
Born in Australia, Paynter moved to Canada with his family at age five and grew up in Kimberley, British Columbia. He holds pilot's licences and is an active hang-glider pilot, motorcyclist, and surfer, and has coached surfers in aerial technique. He was named to ESPN's list of the "50 Most Influential People in Action Sports" in 2012.
