= Ryan Johnson (skier) =

Canadian freestyle skier

Personal information
- Nationality: Canadian
- Born: 13 September 1974 (age 50); Mississauga, Ontario

Sport
- Sport: Freestyle skiing

Ryan Johnson (born 13 September 1974) is a Canadian freestyle skier. He was born in Mississauga, Ontario. He competed at the 2002 Winter Olympics in Salt Lake City, where he placed seventh in men's moguls.
