= Scott Bellavance =

Canadian freestyle skier

Personal information
- Nationality: Canadian
- Born: 7 July 1975 (age 50) Prince George, British Columbia

Sport
- Sport: Freestyle skiing

Scott Bellavance (born 7 July 1975) is a Canadian freestyle skier. He was born in Prince George, British Columbia. He competed at the 2002 Winter Olympics in Salt Lake City, where he placed sixth in men's moguls.
