= Cédric Regnier-Lafforgue =

French freestyle skier (born 1977)

Personal information
- Nationality: French
- Born: 16 February 1977 (age 49) Chambéry, France

Sport
- Sport: Freestyle skiing

Cédric Regnier-Lafforgue (born 16 February 1977) is a French freestyle skier. He competed in the men's moguls event at the 2002 Winter Olympics.
