= Laurent Niol =

French freestyle skier

Personal information
- Nationality: French
- Born: 11 August 1973 (age 51); Bourg-Saint-Maurice, France

Sport
- Sport: Freestyle skiing

Laurent Niol (born 11 August 1973) is a French freestyle skier. He competed in the men's moguls event at the 2002 Winter Olympics.
