= Kentarō Katsuya =

Japanese writer and translator

- 勝矢剣太郎
- Occupations: Writer, translator, and stageplay script writer

Kentarō Katsuya (勝矢剣太郎, Katsuya Kentarō) was a Japanese writer, translator, and stageplay script writer.

In 1927, Katsuya visited England and spoke directly with Sir Robert Baden-Powell about the origin of the Boy Scout movement and the similarities to Satsuma Domain terakoya educational system.

== Works ==
- 『欧州スカウト行脚』／『欧州のスカウト行脚』（成輝堂書房、1928年）
- 『趣味の伊賀路 中大和と伊勢詣で』（笹川臨風らと共著、安進舎・趣味ノ旅叢書、1929年）
- 『英人ミルンの徒然草』（A・A・ミルン著、安進舎出版部、1933年）
