= Sachi Ozawa =

Japanese short track speed skater (born 1976)

Personal information
- Nationality: Japanese
- Born: 23 December 1976 (age 48); Tokyo, Japan

Sport
- Sport: Short track speed skating

Sachi Ozawa (小澤 幸, Ozawa Sachi, born 23 December 1976) is a Japanese short track speed skater. She competed in two events at the 1998 Winter Olympics.
