= Margarita Klimenko =

Russian luger (born 1979)

Personal information
- Nationality: Russian
- Born: 28 July 1979 (age 45); Krasnoyarsk, Russia

Sport
- Sport: Luge

Margarita Klimenko (born 28 July 1979) is a Russian luger. She competed at the 1998 Winter Olympics and the 2002 Winter Olympics.
