= Doris Preindl =

Italian luger

Personal information
- Nationality: Italian
- Born: 9 August 1977 (age 47); Bruneck, Italy

Sport
- Sport: Luge

Doris Preindl (born 9 August 1977) is an Italian luger. She competed in the women's singles event at the 1998 Winter Olympics.
