= Shino Yanagisawa =

Japanese luger (born 1974)

Personal information
- Nationality: Japanese
- Born: 20 February 1974 (age 51); Hokkaido, Japan

Sport
- Sport: Luge

Shino Yanagisawa (born 20 February 1974) is a Japanese luger. She competed in the women's singles event at the 1998 Winter Olympics.
