= Mie Takeda =

Japanese biathlete (born 1976)

Personal information
- Nationality: Japanese
- Born: 13 November 1976 (age 48); Myokokogen, Niigata, Japan

Sport
- Sport: Biathlon

Mie Takeda (born 13 November 1976) is a Japanese biathlete. She competed in the two events at the 1998 Winter Olympics.
