= Kazuko Ikeda =

Japanese alpine skier (born 1974)

Kazuko Ikeda (池田 和子, Ikeda Kazuko, born 2 August 1974 in Niigata Prefecture) is a Japanese alpine skier. She competed in slalom and giant slalom at the 1998 Winter Olympics in Nagano.
