= Jana Šišajová =

Slovak luger (born 1985)

Jana Šišajová (born 1 February 1985 in Kežmarok) is a Slovak luger who has competed since 2000. Competing in two Winter Olympics, she earned her best finish of 22nd in the women's singles event at Turin in 2006.

Šišajová best finish at the FIL World Luge Championships was 24th in the women's singles event at Lake Placid, New York, in 2009. Her best finish at the FIL European Luge Championships was 16th in the women's singles event at Cesana in 2008.
