= Austrian Luge Federation =

Sports governing body in Austria

The Austrian Luge Federation (German: Österreichischer Rodelverband, ÖRV) is the official federation for luge in Austria. It serves as the Austrian representative for the International Luge Federation and is part of the Austrian Olympic Committee (Österreichisches Olympisches Comité).

ÖRV is headquartered in Innsbruck.

== History ==
Since the introduction of the sport Winter Olympic Games in 1964, the members of the Austrian Luge Federation (ÖRV) have won a total of 19 Olympic medals (5 gold, 7 silver, 7 bronze).
