= Agnese Koklača =

Latvian luger

Agnese Koklaca (born 2 March 1990) is a Latvian luger who has competed since 2006. Her best World Cup season finish was 41st twice, earning them in 2006-07 and 2008-09.

She made her Olympic debut in 2010, when finished 24th in the women's singles event.
