= Megan Sweeney =

American luger (born 1987)

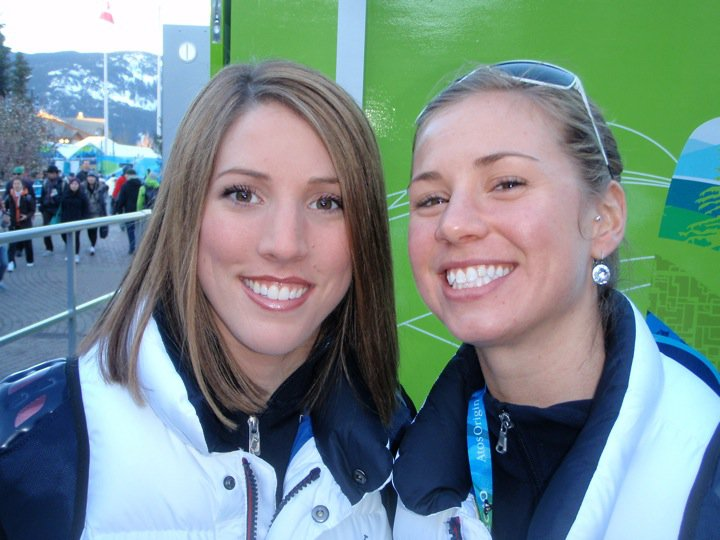
- Sweeney (right) and Erin Hamlin at the 2010 Winter Olympics.

Personal information
- Full name: Megan Rae Sweeney
- Born: February 17, 1987 (age 39) Portland, Maine, U.S.
- Height: 5 ft 4 in (1.63 m)
- Weight: 150 lb (70 kg)

Sport
- Country: United States
- Sport: Luge
- Event: Women's singles

Megan Rae Sweeney (born February 17, 1987, in Portland, Maine) is an American luger who competed from 2007 to 2010.

== Career ==
Her best Luge World Cup season finish was 15th in women's singles in 2007-08.

Sweeney's best finish at the FIL World Luge Championships was 16th in women's singles at Oberhof in 2008. She qualified for the 2010 Winter Olympics where she finished 22nd.

Sweeney announced her retirement from luge on 9 August 2010.

Sweeney is currently pursuing a career in Experiential Marketing and works for On Board Experiential Marketing (www.obexp.com) based in Sausalito, CA. Her younger Sister Emily is still a luger.
