= Hiroshi Kudo =

Japanese cross-country skier (born 1974)

Personal information
- Nationality: JPN
- Born: 3 January 1974 (age 52) Hirosaki Aomori

Sport
- Sport: Skiing

Hiroshi Kudo (工藤 博, Kudō Hiroshi; born 3 January 1974 in Hirosaki, Aomori) is a Japanese cross-country skier. He represented Japan at the 2002 Winter Olympics in Salt Lake City, where he competed in the 15 km and the 50 km events.
