= Eriko Yamada =

Japanese luger (born 1973)

Personal information
- Nationality: Japanese
- Born: 13 June 1973 (age 51); Nagano, Japan

Sport
- Sport: Luge

Eriko Yamada (born 13 June 1973) is a Japanese luger. She competed in the women's singles event at the 1998 Winter Olympics.
