= Kumiko Kashiwagi =

Japanese alpine skier (born 1978)

Kumiko Kashiwagi (柏木 久美子, Kashiwagi Kumiko, born 9 October 1978 in Tokyo) is a Japanese alpine skier. She competed in slalom, giant slalom, and super-G at the 1998 Winter Olympics in Nagano.
