= Aya Yasuda =

Japanese luger (born 1982)

Aya Yasuda (安田 文, Yasuda Aya; born December 18, 1982) is a Japanese luger who has competed since 1992. Her best finish at the FIL World Luge Championships was 22nd in the women's singles event at Nagano in 2004.

Yasuda qualified for the 2010 Winter Olympics, but was later disqualified on a technicality, as her ballast in her sled was over by 200 g (0.44 lb).
