= Mihaela Chiraș =

Romanian luger (born 1987)

- Born: November 8, 1987 (age 38)
- Occupation: luger

Mihaela Chiraș (born November 8, 1987) is a Romanian luger who has competed since 2005. Her best finish at the FIL World Luge Championships was 28th in the women's singles event at Oberhof in 2008.

Chiraș's best finish at the FIL European Luge Championships was 21st in the women's singles event at Cesana in 2008.

Chiraș qualified for the 2010 Winter Olympics, but crashed out during the second run of the event and did not finish.
