= Madoka Harada =

Japanese luger (born 1985)

Madoka Harada (原田窓香, born December 15, 1985) is a Japanese luger who has competed since 2004. Competing in two Winter Olympics, she earned her best finish of 13th in the women's singles event at Turin in 2006.

Harada's best finish at the FIL World Luge Championships was 19th in the women's singles event at Oberhof in 2008.
