= Eriko Sanmiya =

Japanese speed skater (born 1974)

Personal information
- Nationality: Japanese
- Born: 19 September 1974 (age 52) Kushiro, Hokkaido, Japan

Sport
- Sport: Speed skating

Eriko Sanmiya (三宮 恵利子, Sanmiya Eriko; born 19 September 1974) is a Japanese speed skater. She competed at the 1998 Winter Olympics and the 2002 Winter Olympics.
