= Katsuya Nakamoto =

Japanese freestyle skier (born 1977)

Personal information
- Nationality: Japanese
- Born: 13 March 1977 (age 48); Otaru, Japan

Sport
- Sport: Freestyle skiing

Katsuya Nakamoto (中元 勝也, Nakamoto Katsuya, born 13 March 1977) is a Japanese freestyle skier. He competed in the men's moguls event at the 2002 Winter Olympics.
