= Shuichi Sekiya =

Japanese biathlete (born 1969)

Personal information
- Nationality: Japanese
- Born: 11 June 1969 (age 55); Niigata, Japan

Sport
- Sport: Biathlon

Shuichi Sekiya (born 11 June 1969) is a Japanese biathlete. He competed in the men's sprint event at the 1998 Winter Olympics.
