= Hiroaki Ohishi =

Japanese bobsledder (born 1970)

Personal information
- Nationality: Japanese
- Born: 13 March 1970 (age 55); Hiroshima, Japan

Sport
- Sport: Bobsleigh

Hiroaki Ohishi (born 13 March 1970) is a Japanese bobsledder. He competed at the 1998 Winter Olympics and the 2002 Winter Olympics.
