= International Luge Federation =

International luge governing body

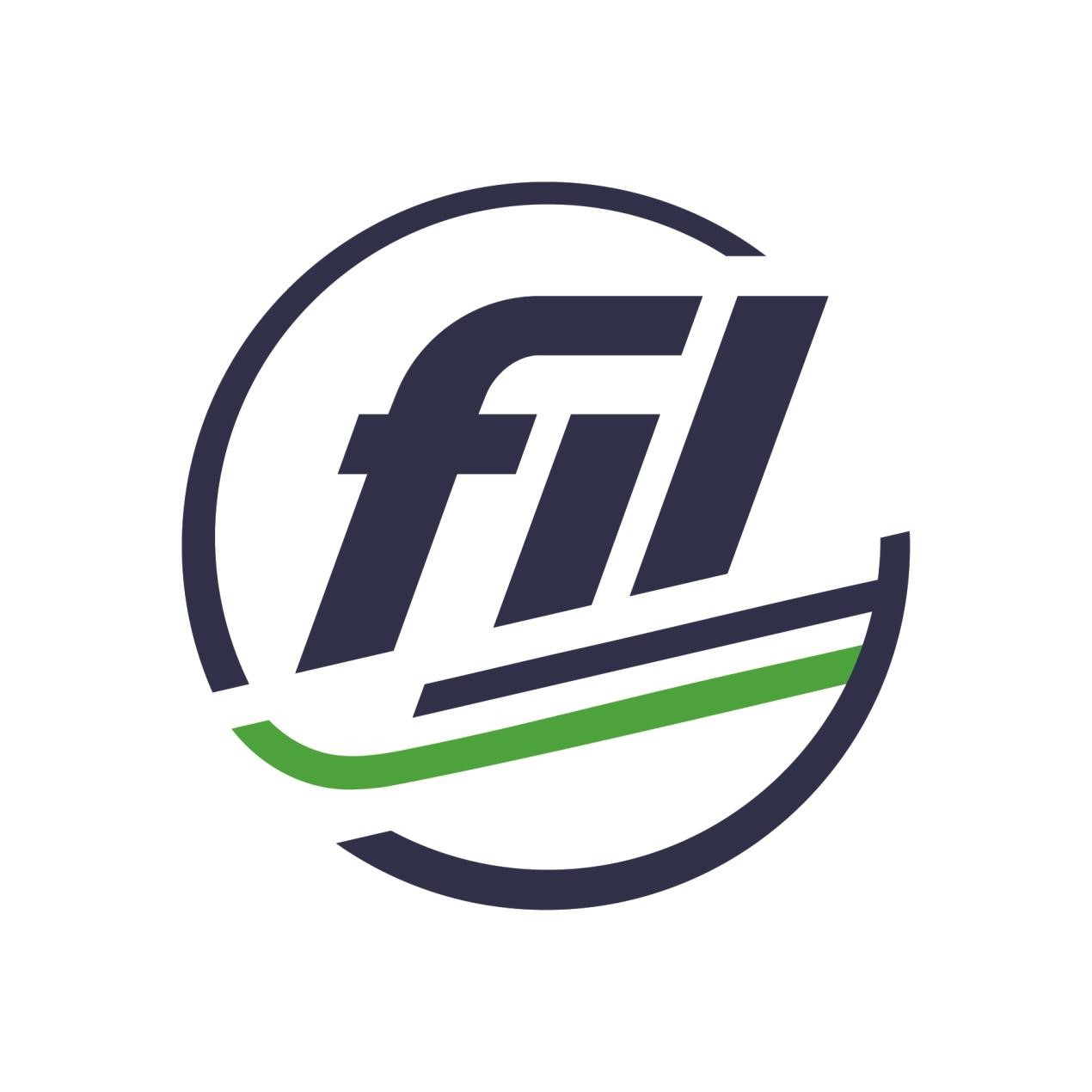
- Former logo
- Sport: Luge
- Category: Sports federation
- Jurisdiction: International
- Abbreviation: FIL
- Founded: 1957; 69 years ago
- Headquarters: Salzburg, Austria
- President: (Latvia) Einars Fogelis

Official website
- www.fil-luge.org

The International Luge Federation (French: Fédération Internationale de Luge (FIL); German: Internationaler Rennrodelverband) is the main international federation for all luge sports. Founded by 13 nations at Davos, Switzerland in 1957, it has members of 53 national luge associations as of 2009 and is based in Berchtesgaden, Germany.

== History ==
=== Early beginnings ===
The first luge competition took place on February 12, 1883, on a four-kilometer course between Davos and Klosters, Switzerland, with the co-winners from Australia and Switzerland having a time of 9 minutes, 15 seconds. Austria, Germany, and Switzerland founded the Internationaler Schlittensportsverband (ISSV – International Sled Sport Federation (in German)) in 1913 in Dresden, Germany. The first European Luge Championships took place in Reichenberg, Bohemia (now Liberec, Czech Republic) in 1914. World War I in Europe caused the ISSV operations to be suspended and prevented any additional competitions until 1927.

=== Rebirth and merging into FIBT ===
In 1927, the ISSV was reestablished with the second European Luge Championships taking place in Schreiberhau, Germany (now Szklarska Poręba, Poland) the following year with a women's competition included. The ISSV was absorbed into the Fédération Internationale de Bobsleigh et de Tobogganing (FIBT – International Bobsleigh and Tobagganing Federation (in French)) in 1935 and was part of the "Section de Luge" until the early 1950s.

=== Independence from FIBT ===
At a 1954 International Olympic Committee (IOC) meeting in Athens, Greece, it was determined that luge would replace skeleton as a Winter Olympic discipline. Skeleton, which had been a sport both at the 1928 and 1948 Winter Olympics, would not return as an Olympic sport until the 2002 Winter Olympics in Salt Lake City. In 1955, the first World Luge Championships were held at Holmenkollen near Oslo, Norway. The FIL was established in Switzerland in 1957 with membership granted into the IOC at their congress in Sofia, Bulgaria that same year. Bert Isatitsch of Austria was elected President of the FIL.

=== FIL growth ===
At the 1959 IOC meeting in Munich, West Germany, luge was approved for inclusion into the 1964 Winter Olympics in Innsbruck with competitions taking place in neighboring Igls. 12 nations took part in the first Winter Olympic luge competitions with timing taking place in 1/100ths of a second. Following a tie in the men's doubles competition between East Germany and Italy at the 1972 Winter Olympics in Sapporo, Japan, the FIL began timing all of their competition in 1/1000ths of a second, a practice that continues as of 2009. The first natural track European championships took place in Kapfenberg, Austria in 1970 while the first natural track World Championships took place in Inzing, Austria in 1979. The first Junior World Championships on artificial track took place at Lake Placid, New York, United States three years later.

=== FIL today ===
Isatitich died suddenly on February 8, 1994, and then Vice-President for Sport Josef Fendt took over as Acting President. Fendt would be named president at the FIL congress in Rome, Italy later that year, a position he held until 2020.

In 2025, the federation's French name changed from Fédération Internationale de Luge de Course to Fédération Internationale de Luge.

== FIL events ==
The FIL governs competitions on artificial tracks and natural tracks at both the European and World Championship levels. At the Winter Olympics, only artificial track competitions are contested. The events at the European and World Championships are men's singles, men's doubles, women's singles, and a team event consisting of one run each from men's singles, men's doubles, and women's singles.

Artificial tracks are tracks that have their curves specifically designed and banked with walled-in straightaways. Made of reinforced concrete and cooled with ammonia refrigeration, these tracks are smooth and have g-forces of up to 4 g (Four times the athlete's body weight). Men's singles on most tracks have their start house close to the bobsleigh and skeleton start locations while both the men's doubles and women's singles have their start house located further down the track. As of 2009, there are sixteen bobsleigh, luge, and skeleton artificial tracks worldwide with a 17th track near Moscow that will host Junior World Cup events in November 2009. Another track in Russia near Sochi, the Sliding Center Sanki, will be in use for the 2014 Winter Olympics, had construction started in May 2009 following controversies at a previous location over track start heights and it being near World Heritage Site, including near an endangered species of brown bear.

Natural tracks are tracks adapted from existing mountain roads and paths, including a horizontal track surface and natural track icing. Most of the over 60 tracks are located in Austria, Italy, Germany, Poland, Canada, the United States, Liechtenstein, Switzerland, Croatia, Russia, Norway, Sweden, Finland, Turkey, Romania, Bulgaria, New Zealand and Slovenia.

== FIL Hall of Fame ==
In 2004, the FIL established a Hall of Fame for the greatest competitors in luge. As of 2008, there have been a total of six inductees.

- 2004: Klaus Bonsack (East Germany, now Germany), Paul Hildgartner (Italy), Margit Schumann (East Germany, now Germany)
- 2005: Josef Feistmantl (Austria), Hans Rinn (East Germany, now Germany)
- 2006: Vera Zozula (Soviet Union, now Latvia)
- 2012: Gerhard Pilz (Austria), Georg Hackl (West Germany
- 2019: Armin Zöggeler (Italy)

== FIL Presidents ==
Since its founding in 1957, FIL has had three presidents, Bert Isatitsch from Austria (1957–94), Josef Fendt from Germany (1994–2020), and Einars Fogelis (2020-current) from Latvia.

== Members ==
53 nations in June 2021:

=== Asia (7) ===
1. China - Chinese Luge Association
2. India - Luge Federation of India
3. Japan - Japan Bobsleigh and Luge Federation
4. Kazakhstan - Luge Federation of the Republic of Kazakhstan
5. South Korea - Korea Luge Federation
6. Kuwait - Kuwait Luge Committee
7. Chinese Taipei - Chinese Taipei Luge and Bobsleigh Association

=== Oceania (3) ===
1. Australia - Luge Australia
2. New Zealand - New Zealand Olympic Luge Association
3. Tonga - Luge Association of the Kingdom of Tonga

=== Americas (8) ===
1. Argentina - Asociación Argentina De Bobsleigh Y Skeleton- Luge
2. Bermuda - Bermuda Bobsled Skeleton & Luge Association
3. Brazil - Confederação Brasileira De Desportos No Gelo
4. Canada - Canadian Luge Association (Cla)
5. United States Virgin Islands - Virgin Islands Luge Federation
6. Puerto Rico - Puerto Rico Winter Sports Federation
7. United States - United States Luge Association
8. Venezuela - Federacion Venezolana De Deportes De Invierno

=== Europe (35) ===
1. Andorra - Associació Andorrana De Luges Esquí Club D'Andorra
2. Austria - Österreichischer Rodelverband
3. Belgium - Association Belge De Luge De Course
4. Bosnia and Herzegovina - Sankaški savez Bosne i Hercegovine
5. Bulgaria - Bulgarian Luge Federation
6. Croatia - Croatian Bobsleigh, Skeleton & Luge Federation
7. Czech Republic - Českomoravská Sáňkařská Asociace
8. Spain - Federación Española Deportes De Hielo
9. Estonia - Estonian Association of Luge Sports
10. Finland - Suomen Kelkkailuliitto
11. France - Fédération Française Des Sports De Glace
12. United Kingdom - Great Britain Luge Association
13. Georgia - Luge Federation of the Republic of Georgia
14. Germany - Bob- Und Schlittenverband Für Deutschland (Bsd)
15. Greece - Hellenic Ice Sports Federation
16. Hungary - Ungarischer Rennrodelverband
17. Ireland - Irish Luge Federation
18. Italy - Federazione Italiana Sport Invernali
19. Latvia - Latvian Luge Federation
20. Liechtenstein - Rodelverband Liechtenstein
21. Lithuania - Lithuanian Luge Federation
22. Moldova - Federația De Schi Și Sanie Din Republica Moldova
23. Netherlands - Bob En Slee Bond Nederland (Bsbn) C/O Nederlandse Ski Vereniging
24. Norway - Norges Ake –, Bob- Og Skeleton Forbund (Nabsf)
25. Poland - Polski Związek Sportow Saneczkowych
26. Portugal - FEDERAÇÃO DE DESPORTOS DE INVERNO DE PORTUGAL
27. Romania - Federația Română De Bob-Sanie
28. Russia - Russian Luge Federation
29. Slovenia - Sankaska Zveza Slovenije
30. Switzerland - Schweizer Bobsleigh – Schlitten Und Skeleton Sportverband
31. Slovakia - Slovenský Zväz Sánkarov
32. Sweden - Svenska Bob Och Rodelförbundet
33. Turkey - Turkish Bobsleigh- Skeleton and Luge Federation
34. Ukraine - Rennrodelverband Der Ukraine
35. Serbia - Serbia Luge Association

==== Russia and Belarus suspension ====
In reaction to the 2022 Russian invasion of Ukraine, in March 2022 the FIL banned all Russian athletes, coaches, and officials from its events, suspended all Russian officials appointed to its Commissions and Working Groups, and deemed Russia ineligible to host any of its events. Also in response to the Russian invasion of Ukraine, Russian Luge Federation's Natalia Gart was expelled from the FIL Executive Board.

In October 2025, the Court of Arbitration for Sport (CAS) decided to allow Russian luge athletes to participate in international competitions in a neutral status, partially satisfying the appeal of the Russian Luge Federation.

== Championships ==
Results:

- Luge at the Winter Olympics
- FIL European Luge Artificial Track Championships
- FIL European Luge Natural Track Championships
- FIL World Luge Artificial Track Championships
- FIL World Luge Natural Track Championships
- World Juniors Luge Championships
- Luge World Cup
- Asian Luge Cup
