= Teppei Noda =

Japanese freestyle skier (born 1977)

Personal information
- Nationality: Japanese
- Born: 21 May 1977 (age 47); Iiyama, Japan

Sport
- Sport: Freestyle skiing

Teppei Noda (野田 鉄平, Noda Teppei, born 21 May 1977) is a Japanese freestyle skier. He competed in the men's moguls event at the 2002 Winter Olympics.
