= Yasuyuki Takishita =

Japanese alpine skier (born 1976)

Yasuyuki Takishita 滝下 靖之
Personal information
- Born: 31 January 1976 (age 50) Rumoi, Hokkaidō, Japan

Skiing career
- Sport: Alpine skiing ♂

Olympics
- Teams: 2 – (1998, 2002)

Yasuyuki Takishita (滝下 靖之, Takishita Yasuyuki; born 31 January 1976 in Rumoi, Hokkaidō) is a Japanese alpine skier. He competed at the 1998 Winter Olympics in Nagano and at the 2002 Winter Olympics in Salt Lake City.
