= Takahisa Oguchi =

Japanese luger (born 1979)

Takahisa Oguchi (小口貴久; born January 11, 1979) is a Japanese luger who has competed since 1999. He finished 20th in the men's singles event at the 2006 Winter Olympics in Turin. At the previous Winter Olympics in Salt Lake City, Oguchi competed in the men's doubles event, but did not finish.

Oguchi's best finish at the FIL World Luge Championships was 16th in the men's singles event at Lake Placid, New York, in 2009.

He later went into graduate research in biomechanics at Shinshu University in Nagano, Japan.

Oguchi qualified for the 2010 Winter Olympics where he finished 30th in the men's singles event.
