= Violeta Strămăturaru =

Romanian luger (born 1988)

Violeta Strămăturaru (born 5 May 1988) is a Romanian luger who has competed since 2001. Her older sister Raluca Strămăturaru is also a luger.

Strămăturaru's best Luge World Cup season finish was 32nd in women's singles in 2008-09. She qualified for the 2010 Winter Olympics. After an accident at the 2010 Winter Olympics she suffered a concussion during training and when she recovered decided to withdraw from the Olympic Luge competition.
