= Shigeaki Ushijima =

Japanese luger (born 1977)

Shigeaki Ushijima (牛島 茂昭, Ushijima Shigeaki, born July 13, 1977) is a Japanese luger who has competed since 1996. Competing in three Winter Olympics, he earned his best finish of 16th in the men's singles event at Nagano in 1998.

Ushijima's best finish at the FIL World Luge Championships was 21st in the men's singles event twice (2004, 2007).
