= Yumie Kobayashi =

Japanese luger (born 1977)

Personal information
- Nationality: Japanese
- Born: 14 August 1977 (age 47); Sapporo, Japan

Sport
- Sport: Luge

Yumie Kobayashi (born 14 August 1977) is a Japanese luger. She competed at the 1998 Winter Olympics and the 2002 Winter Olympics.
