= Alpine skiing at the 1994 Winter Olympics – Men's combined =

Men's combined at the XVII Olympic Winter Games
- Alpine skiing
- Venue: Kvitfjell and Hafjell
- Date: February 14 and 25, 1994
- Competitors: 56 from 27 nations
- Winning time: 3:17.53

Medalists
1st place, gold medalist(s)		Lasse Kjus	Norway
2nd place, silver medalist(s)		Kjetil André Aamodt	Norway
3rd place, bronze medalist(s)		Harald Christian Strand Nilsen	Norway

The Men's combined competition of the Lillehammer 1994 Olympics was held at Kvitfjell and Hafjell.

The defending world champion was Lasse Kjus of Norway, while Luxembourg's Marc Girardelli was the defending World Cup combined champion, and Kjus shared the 1994 World Cup with countryman Kjetil André Aamodt.

== Results ==
Rank	Name	Country	Downhill	Slalom 1	Slalom 2	Total	Difference
1st place, gold medalist(s)	Lasse Kjus	Norway	1:36.95	0:51.25	0:49.33	3:17.53	-
2nd place, silver medalist(s)	Kjetil André Aamodt	Norway	1:37.49	0:51.77	0:49.29	3:18.55	+1.02
3rd place, bronze medalist(s)	Harald Christian Strand Nilsen	Norway	1:39.05	0:51.59	0:48.50	3:19.14	+1.61
4	Günther Mader	Austria	1:38.46	0:52.15	0:48.62	3:19.23	+1.70
5	Tommy Moe	United States	1:37.14	0:52.93	0:49.34	3:19.41	+1.88
6	Paul Accola	Switzerland	1:39.41	0:50.75	0:49.28	3:19.44	+1.91
7	Mitja Kunc	Slovenia	1:40.01	0:50.88	0:48.66	3:19.55	+2.02
8	Fredrik Nyberg	Sweden	1:38.40	0:52.56	0:49.34	3:20.30	+2.77
9	Marc Girardelli	Luxembourg	1:37.61	0:53.35	0:49.51	3:20.47	+2.94
10	Jure Košir	Slovenia	1:42.17	0:50.23	0:48.18	3:20.58	+3.05
11	Miran Ravter	Slovenia	1:38.88	0:52.46	0:49.34	3:20.68	+3.15
12	Steve Locher	Switzerland	1:39.34	0:52.57	0:49.30	3:21.21	+3.68
13	Tobias Hellman	Sweden	1:40.25	0:52.00	0:49.49	3:21.74	+4.21
14	Tobias Barnerssoi	Germany	1:40.56	0:52.23	0:49.70	3:22.49	+4.96
15	Gianfranco Martin	Italy	1:38.84	0:53.58	0:50.27	3:22.69	+5.16
16	Kristian Ghedina	Italy	1:38.14	0:54.28	0:50.75	3:23.17	+5.64
17	Marcel Sulliger	Switzerland	1:39.30	0:53.61	0:51.09	3:24.00	+6.47
18	Atle Skårdal	Norway	1:38.18	0:54.29	0:51.81	3:24.28	+6.75
19	Lyubomir Popov	Bulgaria	1:42.41	0:52.40	0:50.23	3:25.04	+7.51
20	Simon Wi Rutene	New Zealand	1:41.88	0:53.41	0:50.19	3:25.48	+7.95
21	Mika Marila	Finland	1:45.01	0:50.42	0:50.09	3:25.52	+7.99
22	Janne Leskinen	Finland	1:38.88	0:54.47	0:52.18	3:25.53	+8.00
23	Gregor Grilc	Slovenia	1:45.61	0:50.97	0:49.45	3:26.03	+8.50
24	Achim Vogt	Liechtenstein	1:38.53	0:55.29	0:52.41	3:26.23	+8.70
25	Xavier Ubeira	Spain	1:42.78	0:53.17	0:50.97	3:26.92	+9.39
26	Petar Dichev	Bulgaria	1:42.41	0:54.97	0:51.23	3:28.61	+11.08
27	Marcin Szafrański	Poland	1:43.82	0:54.95	0:52.50	3:31.27	+13.74
28	Vicente Tomas	Spain	1:44.32	0:55.68	0:51.61	3:31.61	+14.08
29	Andrey Kolotvin	Kazakhstan	1:41.14	0:58.54	0:54.91	3:34.59	+17.06
30	Attila Bónis	Hungary	1:43.85	0:56.85	0:54.06	3:34.76	+17.23
31	Kyle Rasmussen	United States	1:36.96	1:08.24	0:52.34	3:37.54	+20.01
32	Diego Margozzini	Chile	1:45.07	0:59.68	0:57.64	3:42.39	+24.86
33	Marco Büchel	Liechtenstein	1:40.82	0:53.60	1:13.43	3:47.85	+30.32
-	Alessandro Fattori	Italy	1:38.25	0:53.77	DNF	-	-
-	Kiminobu Kimura	Japan	1:41.73	0:51.45	DNF	-	-
-	Gerard Escoda	Andorra	1:41.93	0:54.22	DNF	-	-
-	Nils Linneberg	Chile	1:40.84	1:00.36	DQ	-	-
-	Cary Mullen	Canada	1:37.33	DNF	-	-	-
-	Ed Podivinsky	Canada	1:37.45	DNF	-	-	-
-	Patrik Järbyn	Sweden	1:38.44	DQ	-	-	-
-	Jean-Luc Crétier	France	1:38.92	DQ	-	-	-
-	Graham Bell	Great Britain	1:38.92	DNS	-	-	-
-	Markus Wasmeier	Germany	1:39.04	DNS	-	-	-
-	Andrey Filichkin	Russia	1:39.77	DNF	-	-	-
-	Christian Mayer	Austria	1:39.86	DNF	-	-	-
-	Chad Fleischer	United States	1:40.17	DNS	-	-	-
-	Georges Mendes	Portugal	1:40.29	DNS	-	-	-
-	Craig Thrasher	United States	1:40.36	DNS	-	-	-
-	Takuya Ishioka	Japan	1:40.55	DNF	-	-	-
-	Vasily Bezsmelnitsyn	Russia	1:41.19	DNF	-	-	-
-	Zurab Dzhidzhishvili	Georgia	1:42.44	DNF	-	-	-
-	Maríano Puricelli	Argentina	1:43.13	DNF	-	-	-
-	Alexis Racloz	Chile	1:45.67	DNF	-	-	-
-	Ovidio García	Spain	1:46.48	DQ	-	-	-
-	Hans Knauss	Austria	DNF	-	-	-	-
-	Bill Gaylord	Great Britain	DNF	-	-	-	-
