= Alpine skiing at the 1994 Winter Olympics – Men's giant slalom =

Men's giant slalom at the XVII Olympic Winter Games
- Alpine skiing
- Venue: Hafjell
- Date: February 23, 1994
- Competitors: 61 from 29 nations
- Winning time: 2:52.46

Medalists
1st place, gold medalist(s)		Markus Wasmeier	Germany
2nd place, silver medalist(s)		Urs Kälin	Switzerland
3rd place, bronze medalist(s)		Christian Mayer	Austria

The Men's giant slalom competition of the Lillehammer 1994 Olympics was held at Hafjell.

The defending world champion was Kjetil André Aamodt of Norway, as well as the defending World Cup giant slalom champion and leader of the 1994 World Cup.

== Results ==
Rank	Name	Country	Run 1	Run 2	Total	Difference
1st place, gold medalist(s)	Markus Wasmeier	Germany	1:28.71	1:23.75	2:52.46	-
2nd place, silver medalist(s)	Urs Kälin	Switzerland	1:28.70	1:23.78	2:52.48	+0.02
3rd place, bronze medalist(s)	Christian Mayer	Austria	1:28.34	1:24.24	2:52.58	+0.12
4	Jan Einar Thorsen	Norway	1:28.78	1:23.93	2:52.71	+0.25
5	Rainer Salzgeber	Austria	1:29.51	1:23.36	2:52.87	+0.41
6	Norman Bergamelli	Italy	1:29.39	1:23.73	2:53.12	+0.66
7	Lasse Kjus	Norway	1:29.07	1:24.16	2:53.23	+0.77
8	Bernhard Gstrein	Austria	1:29.13	1:24.22	2:53.35	+0.89
9	Jeremy Nobis	United States	1:29.02	1:24.58	2:53.60	+1.14
10	Gerhard Königsrainer	Italy	1:29.16	1:24.45	2:53.61	+1.15
11	Günther Mader	Austria	1:29.37	1:24.29	2:53.66	+1.20
12	Kjetil André Aamodt	Norway	1:30.03	1:23.88	2:53.91	+1.45
13	Franck Piccard	France	1:29.79	1:24.18	2:53.97	+1.51
14	Mitja Kunc	Slovenia	1:28.90	1:25.17	2:54.07	+1.61
15	Tobias Barnerssoi	Germany	1:29.96	1:24.53	2:54.49	+2.03
16	Thomas Grandi	Canada	1:29.97	1:24.77	2:54.74	+2.28
17	Ian Piccard	France	1:30.21	1:24.64	2:54.85	+2.39
18	Fredrik Nyberg	Sweden	1:29.96	1:24.98	2:54.94	+2.48
19	Paul Accola	Switzerland	1:30.21	1:24.75	2:54.96	+2.50
20	Rob Crossan	Canada	1:30.85	1:25.25	2:56.10	+3.64
21	Achim Vogt	Liechtenstein	1:31.12	1:25.26	2:56.38	+3.92
22	Jernej Koblar	Slovenia	1:30.75	1:25.92	2:56.67	+4.21
23	Jure Košir	Slovenia	1:31.30	1:25.80	2:57.10	+4.64
24	Gregor Grilc	Slovenia	1:31.38	1:25.75	2:57.13	+4.67
25	Johan Wallner	Sweden	1:31.57	1:25.89	2:57.46	+5.00
26	Kiminobu Kimura	Japan	1:31.86	1:26.64	2:58.50	+6.04
27	Vedran Pavlek	Croatia	1:32.13	1:26.78	2:58.91	+6.45
28	Xavier Ubeira	Spain	1:32.07	1:27.28	2:59.35	+6.89
29	Gianfranco Martin	Italy	1:32.28	1:27.56	2:59.84	+7.38
30	Kristinn Björnsson	Iceland	1:33.88	1:27.28	3:01.16	+8.70
31	Spencer Pession	Great Britain	1:33.94	1:28.68	3:02.62	+10.16
32	Georges Mendes	Portugal	1:35.94	1:29.26	3:05.20	+12.74
33	Hur Seung-Wook	South Korea	1:38.08	1:29.67	3:07.75	+15.29
34	Erik Schlopy	United States	1:42.26	1:27.74	3:10.00	+17.54
-	Alberto Tomba	Italy	1:29.53	DQ	-	-
-	Harper Phillips	United States	1:30.31	DNF	-	-
-	Marco Büchel	Liechtenstein	1:31.82	DNF	-	-
-	Daniel Vogt	Liechtenstein	1:31.97	DNF	-	-
-	Hans Burkhard	Liechtenstein	1:32.73	DNF	-	-
-	Luis Cristobal	Spain	1:33.34	DNF	-	-
-	Bill Gaylord	Great Britain	1:33.58	DQ	-	-
-	Anthony Huguet	Australia	1:33.60	DNF	-	-
-	Janne Leskinen	Finland	1:34.65	DNS	-	-
-	Johnny Albertsen	Denmark	1:37.35	DNF	-	-
-	Michael von Grünigen	Switzerland	DNF	-	-	-
-	Marc Girardelli	Luxembourg	DNF	-	-	-
-	Steve Locher	Switzerland	DNF	-	-	-
-	Ole Kristian Furuseth	Norway	DNF	-	-	-
-	Tobias Hellman	Sweden	DNF	-	-	-
-	Simon Wi Rutene	New Zealand	DNF	-	-	-
-	Casey Puckett	United States	DNF	-	-	-
-	Patrik Järbyn	Sweden	DNF	-	-	-
-	Lyubomir Popov	Bulgaria	DNF	-	-	-
-	Andrey Filichkin	Russia	DNF	-	-	-
-	Gerard Escoda	Andorra	DNF	-	-	-
-	Mika Marila	Finland	DNF	-	-	-
-	Federico Van Ditmar	Argentina	DNF	-	-	-
-	Victor Gómez	Andorra	DNF	-	-	-
-	Vasily Bezsmelnitsyn	Russia	DNF	-	-	-
-	Nicola Ercolani	San Marino	DNF	-	-	-
-	Enis Bećirbegović	Bosnia and Herzegovina	DNF	-	-	-
