= Alpine skiing at the 1994 Winter Olympics – Men's super-G =

Men's Super G at the XVII Olympic Winter Games
- Alpine skiing
- Venue: Kvitfjell
- Date: February 17, 1994
- Competitors: 69 from 28 nations
- Winning time: 1:32.53

Medalists
1st place, gold medalist(s)		Markus Wasmeier	Germany
2nd place, silver medalist(s)		Tommy Moe	United States
3rd place, bronze medalist(s)		Kjetil André Aamodt	Norway

Men's Aupwe-G
- Location: Kvitfjell; Olympiabakken
- Vertical: 641 m (2,103 ft)
- Top elevation: 823 m (2,700 ft)
- Base elevation: 182 m (597 ft)

The men's super-G competition of the Lillehammer 1994 Olympics was held at Kvitfjell on Thursday, 17 February.

Norway's Kjetil André Aamodt was the defending Olympic and World Cup super-G champion and Marc Girardelli led the current season.

Germany's Markus Wasmeier won the gold medal, downhill champion Tommy Moe took the silver (on his 24th birthday), and Aamodt was the bronze medalist.

The Olympiabakken course started at an elevation of 823 m (2,700 ft) above sea level with a vertical drop of 641 m (2,103 ft) and a course length of 2.574 km (1.60 mi). Wasmeier's winning time was 92.53 seconds, yielding an average course speed of 100.145 km/h (62.2 mph), with an average vertical descent rate of 6.927 m/s (22.7 ft/s).

== Results ==
The race was started at 11:00 local time, (UTC +1). At the starting gate, the skies were clear, the temperature was −10.0 °C (14 °F), and the snow condition was hard; the temperature at the finish was lower, at −15.0 °C (5 °F).

Rank	Bib	Name	Country	Time	Difference
1st place, gold medalist(s)	4	Markus Wasmeier	Germany	1:32.53	—
2nd place, silver medalist(s)	3	Tommy Moe	United States	1:32.61	+0.08
3rd place, bronze medalist(s)	8	Kjetil André Aamodt	Norway	1:32.93	+0.40
4	9	Marc Girardelli	Luxembourg	1:33.07	+0.54
5	11	Werner Perathoner	Italy	1:33.10	+0.57
6	1	Atle Skårdal	Norway	1:33.31	+0.78
7	6	Jan Einar Thorsen	Norway	1:33.37	+0.84
8	30	Luc Alphand	France	1:33.39	+0.86
9	5	Günther Mader	Austria	1:33.50	+0.97
10	7	Marco Hangl	Switzerland	1:33.75	+1.22
11	15	Armin Assinger	Austria	1:33.84	+1.31
12	12	Lasse Kjus	Norway	1:34.02	+1.49
13	19	Janne Leskinen	Finland	1:34.09	+1.56
14	29	Paul Accola	Switzerland	1:34.37	+1.84
15	20	Peter Runggaldier	Italy	1:34.44	+1.91
16	31	Pietro Vitalini	Italy	1:34.46	+1.93
17	18	Christophe Plé	France	1:34.50	+1.97
18	27	Patrik Järbyn	Sweden	1:34.51	+1.98
19	22	Tobias Hellman	Sweden	1:34.59	+2.06
20	10	Hans Knauss	Austria	1:34.65	+2.12
21	28	Hansjörg Tauscher	Germany	1:34.71	+2.18
22	32	Miran Ravter	Slovenia	1:34.73	+2.20
23	17	Franck Piccard	France	1:34.75	+2.22
24	23	Cary Mullen	Canada	1:34.84	+2.31
25	16	Fredrik Nyberg	Sweden	1:34.96	+2.43
26	54	Brian Stemmle	Canada	1:34.99	+2.46
27	35	Daniel Vogt	Liechtenstein	1:35.08	+2.55
28	45	Mitja Kunc	Slovenia	1:35.15	+2.62
29	21	Jernej Koblar	Slovenia	1:35.16	+2.63
30	46	Andrey Filichkin	Russia	1:35.26	+2.73
31	40	Nicolas Burtin	France	1:35.28	+2.75
32	38	Marco Büchel	Liechtenstein	1:35.78	+3.25
33	36	Kiminobu Kimura	Japan	1:36.38	+3.85
34	53	Vasily Bezsmelnitsyn	Russia	1:36.50	+3.97
35	62	Lyubomir Popov	Bulgaria	1:37.01	+4.48
36	66	Luis Cristobal	Spain	1:37.31	+4.78
37	43	Anthony Huguet	Australia	1:37.44	+4.91
38	48	Xavier Ubeira	Spain	1:37.60	+5.07
39	59	Vicente Tomas	Spain	1:38.02	+5.49
40	51	Mika Marila	Finland	1:38.14	+5.61
41	65	Vedran Pavlek	Croatia	1:38.51	+5.98
42	61	Marcin Szafrański	Poland	1:38.54	+6.01
43	60	Victor Gómez	Andorra	1:38.64	+6.11
44	49	Gerard Escoda	Andorra	1:38.77	+6.24
45	50	Attila Bónis	Hungary	1:38.83	+6.30
46	58	Ramon Rossell	Andorra	1:40.25	+7.72
47	63	Alexis Racloz	Chile	1:41.12	+8.59
48	68	Gáston Begue	Argentina	1:41.21	+8.68
-	2	Daniel Mahrer	Switzerland	DNF	-
-	13	Hannes Trinkl	Austria	DNF	-
-	14	William Besse	Switzerland	DNF	-
-	24	Tobias Barnerssoi	Germany	DNF	-
-	25	Kyle Rasmussen	United States	DQ	-
-	26	Alessandro Fattori	Italy	DNF	-
-	33	A. J. Kitt	United States	DQ	-
-	34	Achim Vogt	Liechtenstein	DNF	-
-	37	Jürgen Hasler	Liechtenstein	DNF	-
-	39	Chad Fleischer	United States	DNF	-
-	41	Ralf Socher	Canada	DNF	-
-	42	Graham Bell	Great Britain	DNF	-
-	44	Ed Podivinsky	Canada	DNF	-
-	47	Georges Mendes	Portugal	DNF	-
-	52	Nils Linneberg	Chile	DNF	-
-	55	Simon Wi Rutene	New Zealand	DNF	-
-	56	Federico Van Ditmar	Argentina	DNF	-
-	57	Santi López	Andorra	DNF	-
-	64	Spencer Pession	Great Britain	DNF	-
-	67	Carlos Manuel Bustos	Argentina	DNF	-
-	69	Julien Castellini	Monaco	DNF	-
