= Alpine skiing at the 1994 Winter Olympics – Men's slalom =

Men's slalom at the XVII Olympic Winter Games
- Alpine skiing
- Venue: Hafjell
- Date: February 27, 1994
- Competitors: 57 from 25 nations
- Winning time: 2:02.02

Medalists
1st place, gold medalist(s)		Thomas Stangassinger	Austria
2nd place, silver medalist(s)		Alberto Tomba	Italy
3rd place, bronze medalist(s)		Jure Košir	Slovenia

The Men's slalom competition of the Lillehammer 1994 Olympics was held at Hafjell.

The defending world champion was Kjetil André Aamodt of Norway, while Sweden's Thomas Fogdö was the defending World Cup slalom champion and Alberto Tomba champion of the 1994 World Cup.

== Results ==
Rank	Name	Country	Run 1	Run 2	Total	Difference
1st place, gold medalist(s)	Thomas Stangassinger	Austria	1:01.00	1:01.02	2:02.02	+0.00
2nd place, silver medalist(s)	Alberto Tomba	Italy	1:02.84	0:59.33	2:02.17	+0.15
3rd place, bronze medalist(s)	Jure Košir	Slovenia	1:02.55	0:59.98	2:02.53	+0.51
4	Mitja Kunc	Slovenia	1:02.82	0:59.80	2:02.62	+0.60
5	Thomas Fogdö	Sweden	1:02.98	1:00.07	2:03.05	+1.03
6	Finn Christian Jagge	Norway	1:02.16	1:01.03	2:03.19	+1.17
7	Paul Casey Puckett	United States	1:02.97	1:00.50	2:03.47	+1.45
8	Angelo Weiss	Italy	1:02.77	1:00.95	2:03.72	+1.70
9	Patrick Staub	Switzerland	1:02.46	1:01.73	2:04.19	+2.17
10	Andrej Miklavc	Slovenia	1:02.57	1:01.78	2:04.35	+2.33
11	Andrea Zinsli	Switzerland	1:02.87	1:02.07	2:04.94	+2.92
12	Mika Marila	Finland	1:02.54	1:02.45	2:04.99	+2.97
13	Mats Ericson	Sweden	1:03.25	1:02.24	2:05.49	+3.47
14	Thomas Grandi	Canada	1:03.48	1:02.06	2:05.54	+3.52
15	Michael von Grünigen	Switzerland	1:03.94	1:01.94	2:05.88	+3.86
16	Yves Dimier	France	1:03.72	1:03.27	2:06.99	+4.97
17	Paul Accola	Switzerland	1:04.45	1:03.11	2:07.56	+5.54
18	Kiminobu Kimura	Japan	1:05.26	1:02.71	2:07.97	+5.95
19	Takuya Ishioka	Japan	1:05.94	1:04.40	2:10.34	+8.32
20	Vicente Tomas	Spain	1:06.71	1:06.73	2:13.44	+11.42
21	Hur Seung-Wook	South Korea	1:07.43	1:06.23	2:13.66	+11.64
22	Attila Bónis	Hungary	1:10.87	1:09.56	2:20.43	+18.41
-	Kjetil André Aamodt	Norway	1:01.80	DNF	-	-
-	Peter Roth	Germany	1:01.84	DNF	-	-
-	Thomas Sykora	Austria	1:02.03	DNF	-	-
-	Rob Crossan	Canada	1:03.45	DNF	-	-
-	Sébastien Amiez	France	1:03.66	DNF	-	-
-	Tetsuya Okabe	Japan	1:03.98	DNF	-	-
-	Matt Grosjean	United States	1:04.24	DNF	-	-
-	Jeremy Nobis	United States	1:04.86	DNF	-	-
-	Armin Bittner	Germany	DNF	-	-	-
-	Gregor Grilc	Slovenia	DQ	-	-	-
-	Ole Kristian Furuseth	Norway	DQ	-	-	-
-	Günther Mader	Austria	DNF	-	-	-
-	Bernhard Gstrein	Austria	DNF	-	-	-
-	Lasse Kjus	Norway	DNF	-	-	-
-	Marc Girardelli	Luxembourg	DQ	-	-	-
-	Bernhard Bauer	Germany	DNF	-	-	-
-	Fabrizio Tescari	Italy	DNF	-	-	-
-	Johan Wallner	Sweden	DNF	-	-	-
-	Norman Bergamelli	Italy	DNF	-	-	-
-	Erik Schlopy	United States	DNF	-	-	-
-	Ovidio García	Spain	DNF	-	-	-
-	Gaku Hirasawa	Japan	DNF	-	-	-
-	Tobias Hellman	Sweden	DNF	-	-	-
-	Lyubomir Popov	Bulgaria	DNF	-	-	-
-	Gerard Escoda	Andorra	DNF	-	-	-
-	Kristinn Björnsson	Iceland	DNF	-	-	-
-	Simon Wi Rutene	New Zealand	DNF	-	-	-
-	Bill Gaylord	Great Britain	DNF	-	-	-
-	Xavier Ubeira	Spain	DNF	-	-	-
-	Haukur Arnórsson	Iceland	DNF	-	-	-
-	Federico Van Ditmar	Argentina	DNF	-	-	-
-	Petar Dichev	Bulgaria	DNF	-	-	-
-	Marcin Szafrański	Poland	DNF	-	-	-
-	Vedran Pavlek	Croatia	DNF	-	-	-
-	Levan Abramishvili	Georgia	DNF	-	-	-
