= Tommy Moe =

American alpine skier (born 1970)

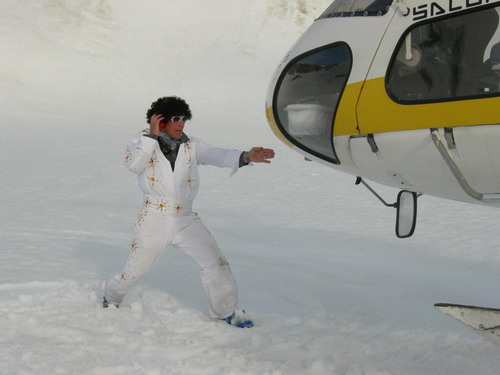
- Moe in the Tordrillo Mountains in Alaska, June 2006

Personal information
- Full name: Thomas Sven Moe
- Born: February 17, 1970 (age 56) Missoula, Montana, U.S.
- Height: 5 ft 10 in (178 cm)

Skiing career
- Sport: Alpine skiing
- Retired: June 1998 (age 28)
- Disciplines: Downhill; super-G; combined
- World Cup debut: March 17, 1990 (age 20) (first top 15)

Olympics
- Teams: 3 – (1992, 1994, 1998)
- Medals: 2 (1 gold)

World Championships
- Teams: 3 – (1989, 1993, 1996)
- Medals: 0

World Cup
- Seasons: 9 – (1990–1998)
- Wins: 1 – (1 SG)
- Podiums: 7 – (3 DH, 4 SG)
- Overall titles: 0 – (8th in 1994)
- Discipline titles: 0 – (3rd in SG, 1994)
Medal record
Men's alpine skiing
Representing the United States
Olympic Games
Gold medal – first place	1994 Lillehammer	Downhill
Silver medal – second place	1994 Lillehammer	Super-G
Junior World Ski Championships
Gold medal – first place	1989 Alyeska	Combined
Gold medal – first place	1989 Alyeska	Super-G
Silver medal – second place	1987 Hemsedal	Downhill
Winter Pan American Games
Silver medal – second place	1990 Las Leñas	Super-G

Thomas Sven Moe (born February 17, 1970) is a former World Cup alpine ski racer from the United States. An Olympic gold and silver medalist in 1994, he specialized in the speed events of downhill and super G.

== Early years ==
Born in Missoula, Montana, Moe learned to ski and race at the Big Mountain near Whitefish, where his father was a member of the ski patrol. Moe refined his skills as a teenager in Alaska at Alyeska, near Anchorage, where he attended the Glacier Creek Ski Academy. He joined the U.S. Ski Team in 1986 at age 16.

== Racing career ==
Moe made his World Cup debut at 17 and days before he turned 19, competed at the 1989 World Championships in Vail, Colorado where he placed 12th in the downhill competition. He earned his first World Cup points (top 15) in March 1990 with a 13th-place finish at Åre, Sweden in the 1990 season's final race.

In a surprising performance in the 1994 Winter Olympics at Lillehammer, Norway, Moe became the first American male ski racer to win two medals in a single Winter Olympics, with a gold in the downhill and silver in the super-G at Kvitfjell. At the time Moe was a resident of Alaska; after his Olympic victories his father was shown on television waving the Alaska state flag.

Of Norwegian ancestry, he quickly became a favorite with the crowd at Kvitfjell, despite edging out Kjetil André Aamodt of Norway by 0.04 seconds to take the gold medal in the downhill. He then placed second in the super-G on his 24th birthday, finishing 0.09 seconds behind Markus Wasmeier of Germany. Moe's success came despite not having yet won a World Cup race, though he had attained three podiums and had raced well the previous twelve months, starting with a fifth place in the downhill at the 1993 World Championships in Morioka, Japan. (He won a month after the Olympics, a super-G at Whistler, Canada, his sole World Cup victory).

Moe's best World Cup season was also in 1994, where he finished third in the super-G and eighth in both the downhill and overall standings. (Since 1971, the World Cup standings have not included the Winter Olympics or World Championships results.)

In March 1995, Moe suffered a right knee injury at Kvitfjell, on the same race course on which he won his Olympic medals thirteen months earlier. After his recovery, he never regained his top form and missed the World Championships in 1997 after a fluke thumb injury in late January required surgery. He returned in March and won the downhill at the U.S. Alpine Championships in Maine. Moe made his third U.S. Olympic team for the 1998 Nagano Games and finished eighth in the super-G and twelfth in the downhill at Hakuba. He retired from competitive ski racing that June at age 28.

== Career highlights ==
- 1994 Winter Olympics in Lillehammer, Norway, two medals
  - Gold medal in Downhill
  - Silver medal in Super-G (on his 24th birthday)
- Five U.S. Alpine Championship titles
- One World Cup victory (1994, super-G at Whistler)
- Inducted into the National Ski Hall of Fame in 2003

== World Cup results ==
=== Season standings ===
Season	Age	Overall	Slalom	Giant slalom	Super-G	Downhill	Combined
1990	20	97	—	—	—	36	—
1991	21	74	—	—	—	29	—
1992	22	79	—	—	49	40	31
1993	23	31	—	—	26	19	48
1994	24	8	—	—	3	8	4
1995	25	28	—	—	11	18	12
1996	26	152	—	—	62	65	—
1997	27	87	—	—	50	35	—
1998	28	72	—	—	32	35	—

=== Race podiums ===
- 1 win - (1 SG)
- 7 podiums - (4 DH, 3 SG)

Season	Date	Location	Discipline	Place
1993	27 Feb 1993	Whistler, BC, Canada	Downhill	2nd
1994	12 Dec 1993	Val-d'Isère, France	Super-G	3rd
1994	29 Dec 1993	Bormio, Italy	Downhill	3rd
1994	12 Mar 1994	Whistler, BC, Canada	Downhill	3rd
1994	13 Mar 1994	Whistler, BC, Canada	Super-G	1st
1994	16 Mar 1994	Vail, Colorado	Downhill	3rd
1995	11 Dec 1994	Tignes, France	Super-G	2nd

== World Championship results ==
Year	Age	Slalom	Giant slalom	Super-G	Downhill	Combined
1989	19	—	—	21	12	—
1991	21					
1993	23	—	—	canceled	5	13
1996	26	—	—	42	21	—
1997	27	thumb injury, did not compete				

- The Super-G in 1993 was canceled after multiple weather delays.

== Olympic results ==
Year	Age	Slalom	Giant slalom	Super-G	Downhill	Combined
1992	22	—	—	28	20	18
1994	24	—	—	2	1	5
1998	28	—	—	8	12	—

== After racing ==
Moe was inducted into the National Ski Hall of Fame in Ishpeming, Michigan five years later, and is a co-owner of Tordrillo Mountain Lodge in the Alaska Range. He lives in Wilson, Wyoming. He serves as an ambassador of skiing at nearby Jackson Hole Mountain Resort in Teton Village, Wyoming.

== Personal ==
Moe and longtime girlfriend Megan Gerety, also a skier who competed in downhill and super-G at the 1994 Olympic Winter Games, married in 2003; they have two daughters and live in Wilson.
