= Hans Burkhard =

Liechtenstein cyclist and alpine skier (born 1973)

Medal record

Representing Liechtenstein

Games of the Small States of Europe
Silver medal – second place	Luxembourg 2013	Road Race

Hans Burkhard (born 24 December 1973) is a Liechtensteiner cyclist and former alpine skier who competed in the 1994 Winter Olympics.

At the 2013 Games of the Small States of Europe he won silver medal in road race.

== Alpine skiing career ==
=== Olympic results ===
Year
Year	Age	Slalom	Giant; Slalom	Super G	Downhill	Combined
1994	20	—	DNF2	—	—	—
