= Mitja Kunc =

Slovenian alpine skier

Medal record

Men's alpine skiing

Representing Slovenia

World Championships
Bronze medal – third place	2001 St. Anton	Slalom

Mitja Kunc (born 12 November 1971 in Črna na Koroškem, SFR Yugoslavia), is a former Slovenian alpine skier.

He has one victory in Alpine Skiing World Cup. The first peak of his career was in 1994 Winter Olympics, where he finished 4th in slalom. In the following years he was treated for injuries until the second peak of his career in years 2000–2002, when he won a race in Yongpyong and a bronze medal in Alpine World Ski Championships 2001, both of them in slalom. He retired in 2005 after the race in Kranjska Gora.

== World Cup results ==
=== Season standings ===
Season	Age	Overall	Slalom	Giant slalom	Super-G	Downhill	Combined
1990	18	107	—	41	—	—	—
1991	19	52	—	17	—	—	—
1992	20	99	—	34	—	—	—
1993	21	89	—	22	—	—	—
1994	22	35	32	12	—	—	—
1995	23	47	28	17	—	—	—
1996	24	49	24	21	—	—	—
1997	25	70	41	26	—	—	—
1998	26	113	—	44	—	—	—
1999	27	58	37	24	—	—	—
2000	28	19	12	8	—	—	—
2001	29	26	9	29	—	—	—
2002	30	25	4	—	—	—	—
2003	31	67	25	—	—	—	—
2004	32	99	44	—	—	—	—
2005	33	126	49	—	—	—	—

=== Race podiums ===
- 1 win (1 SL)
- 6 podiums (4 SL, 2 GS)

Season	Date	Location	Discipline	Position
1994	18 January 1994	Crans-Montana, Switzerland	Giant slalom	2nd
1995	6 January 1995	Kranjska Gora, Slovenia	Giant slalom	2nd
2000	27 February 2000	Yongpyong, South Korea	Slalom	1st
2001	23 January 2001	Schladming, Austria	Slalom	3rd
2002	6 January 2002	Adelboden, Switzerland	Slalom	3rd
2002	13 January 2002	Wengen, Switzerland	Slalom	2nd

== Olympic Games results ==
Season	Age	Slalom	Giant slalom	Super-G	Downhill	Combined
1992	20	—	23	27	—	—
1994	22	4	14	28	—	7
1998	26	—	18	—	—	—
2002	30	DNF2	28	—	—	—

== World Championships results ==
Season	Age	Slalom	Giant slalom	Super-G	Downhill	Combined
1991	19	—	6	—	—	—
1993	21	—	17	—	—	—
1996	24	14	14	36	43	5
1997	25	—	—	—	—	—
1999	27	15	DNF2	—	—	—
2001	29	3	15	—	—	—
2003	31	DNF2	DNS2	—	—	—
