= Jure Košir =

Slovenian alpine skier

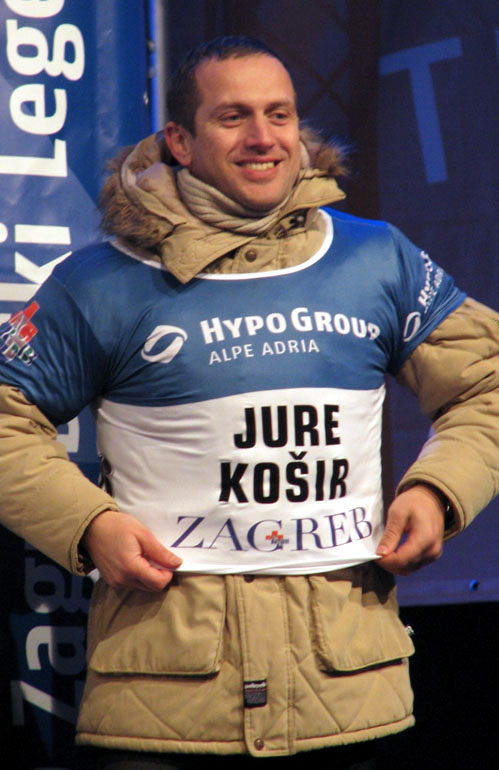

Personal information
- Born: 24 April 1972 (age 54) Jesenice, SFR Yugoslavia

Skiing career
- Sport: Alpine skiing
- Club: ASK Kranjska Gora
- Retired: 25 March 20
- Disciplines: Giant slalom, slalom
- World Cup debut: 24 November 1991

Olympics
- Medals: 1 (0 gold)

World Championships
- Medals: 0 (0 gold)

World Cup
- Seasons: 15
- Wins: 3
- Podiums: 20
- Overall titles: 0
- Discipline titles: 0
Medal record
Men's alpine skiing
Representing Slovenia
Olympic Games
Bronze medal – third place	1994 Lillehammer	Slalom

Jure Košir (born 24 April 1972) is a Slovenian former alpine skier.

== Career ==
Košir's first international success was the title of the world junior champion in super-G, won in Hemsedal in 1991. Later he focused in technical disciplines, esp. slalom and made quick progress, noticed also by his good friend, Italian champion Alberto Tomba. The first peak of his career was achieved in the season 1993/94 when he achieved the first World Cup victory for independent Slovenia, won the bronze medal at the 1994 Winter Olympics in Lillehammer and finished the season at the 3rd place of the World Cup slalom standings.

The next season, 1994/95, was successful as well. He couldn't beat Alberto Tomba but he won three World Cup medals: silver in giant slalom standings, bronze in slalom and overall standings.

The next few seasons were slightly less successful until he reached his second peak of his career in 1998/99 when he won two more slalom races (one of them was at his "home" resort in Kranjska Gora) and finished the season at the 2nd place of the World Cup slalom standings. After this season his career gradually went down so in 2005 he announced he would conclude his career after the 2005/06 season. He confirmed his retirement after the 2006 Winter Olympics when he was not chosen to compete in slalom.

Besides that he won additional 20 top 3 podiums, 18 of them at slalom.

Besides his achievements in sport, he has also engaged in musical activity in the mid-1990s, during the peak of his popularity. He recorded a few rap songs, one of them, "Včasih smučam hit, včasih pa počas" ("Sometimes I ski fast, sometimes I ski slowly"), being quite popular in Slovenia. He was also a member of a rap group, Pasji kartel ("Dog's cartel").

He officially ended his skiing career on 25 March 2006 with an event in Kranjska Gora including special skiing competition between ski legends (Bojan Križaj, Ingemar Stenmark, Boris Strel, Mateja Svet, Alberto Tomba and many others) and many music performances.

== World Cup results ==
=== Season standings ===
Season	Age	Overall	Slalom	Giant slalom	Super-G	Downhill	Combined
1992	19	112	42	49	—	—	—
1993	20	26	6	34	—	—	—
1994	21	15	3	23	—	—	—
1995	22	3	3	2	—	—	—
1996	23	13	5	17	—	—	—
1997	24	30	16	13	—	—	—
1998	25	21	8	19	—	—	—
1999	26	12	2	18	—	—	—
2000	27	31	10	41	—	—	—
2001	28	25	6	—	—	—	—
2002	29	43	13	42	—	—	—
2003	30	146	59	—	—	—	—
2004	31	83	33	—	—	—	—
2005	32	85	32	—	—	—	—
2006	33	123	52	—	—	—	—

=== Race podiums ===
- 3 wins (3 SL)
- 20 podiums (18 SL, 2 GS)

Season	Date	Location	Discipline	Position
1993	17 January 1993	Lech, Austria	Slalom	2nd
1994	28 November 1993	Park City, United States	Slalom	2nd
1994	5 December 1993	Stoneham, Canada	Slalom	3rd
1994	20 December 1993	Madonna di Campiglio, Italy	Slalom	1st
1994	30 January 1994	Chamonix, France	Slalom	3rd
1994	6 February 1994	Garmisch-Partenkirchen, Germany	Slalom	3rd
1995	20 December 1994	Lech, Austria	Slalom	3rd
1995	15 January 1995	Kitzbühel, Austria	Slalom	2nd
1995	22 January 1995	Wengen, Switzerland	Slalom	3rd
1995	4 February 1995	Adelboden, Switzerland	Giant slalom	2nd
1995	20 February 1995	Furano, Japan	Giant slalom	2nd
1996	22 December 1995	Kranjska Gora, Slovenia	Slalom	2nd
1996	7 January 1996	Flachau, Austria	Slalom	3rd
1996	14 January 1996	Kitzbühel, Austria	Slalom	3rd
1996	10 March 1996	Hafjell, Norway	Slalom	3rd
1999	14 December 1998	Sestriere, Italy	Slalom	3rd
1999	6 January 1999	Kranjska Gora, Slovenia	Slalom	1st
1999	24 January 1999	Kitzbühel, Austria	Slalom	1st
2001	21 January 2001	Kitzbühel, Austria	Slalom	2nd
2001	18 February 2001	Shigakogen, Japan	Slalom	3rd

== Olympic Games results ==
Season	Age	Slalom	Giant slalom	Super-G	Downhill	Combined
1992	19	—	22	29	—	13
1994	21	3	23	—	—	—
1998	25	DNF1	5	—	—	—
2002	29	8	DNF2	—	—	—

== World championships results ==
Season	Age	Slalom	Giant slalom	Super-G	Downhill	Combined
1996	23	DNF2	8	—	—	—
1997	24	12	DNF1	—	—	—
1999	26	10	19	—	—	—
2001	28	8	—	—	—	—
2003	30	did not compete				
2005	32	DNF1	—	—	—	—

Olympic Games
Preceded by Franci Petek	Flagbearer for Slovenia; Lillehammer 1994	Succeeded by Primož Peterka
