= Kvitfjell =

Norwegian ski resort

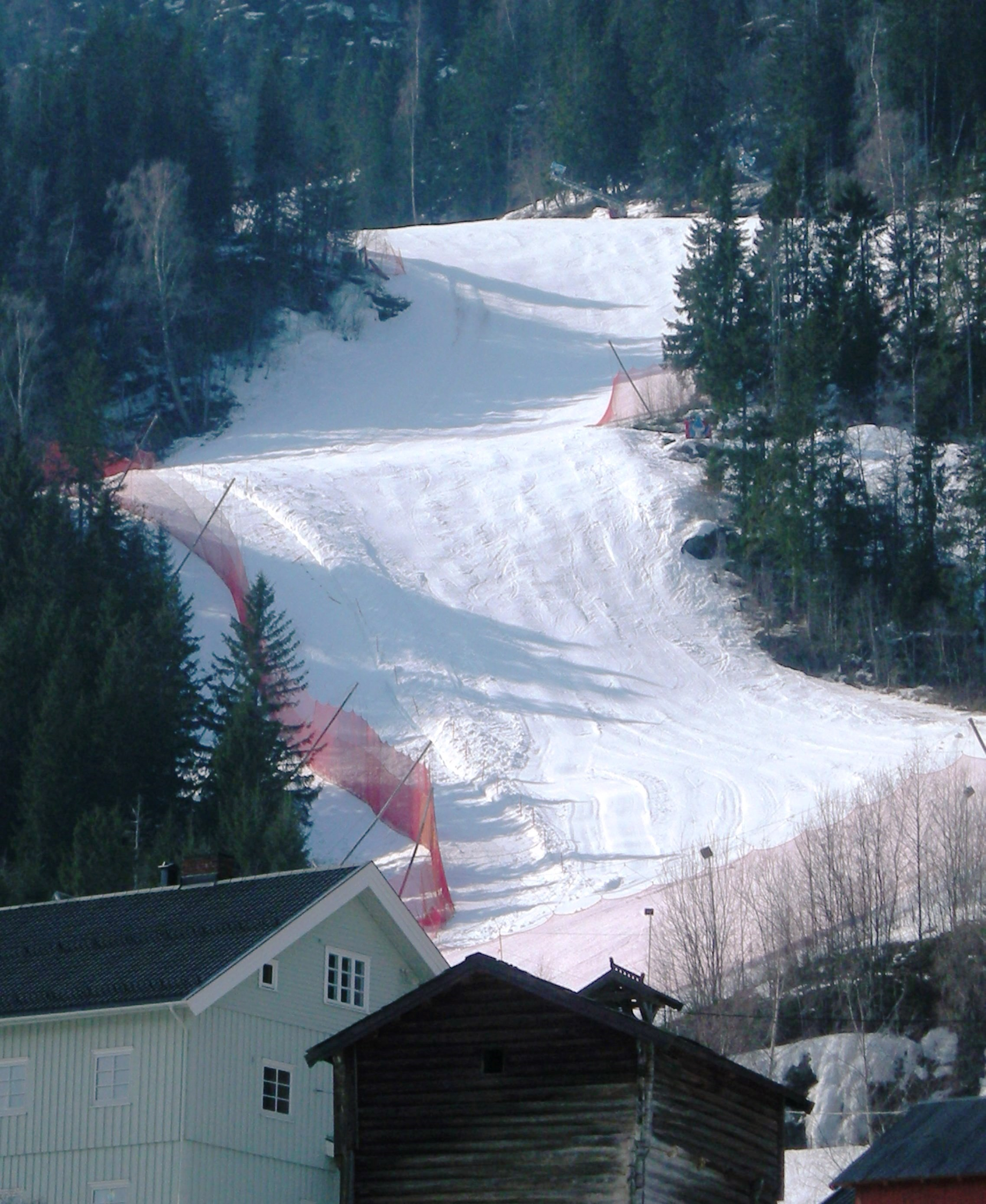
- Kvitfjell in April 2010

- Location in Norway Kvitfjell (Norway)
- Location: Ringebu, Innlandet, Norway
- Nearest city: Lillehammer: 55 km (34 mi)
- Coordinates: 61.45°N 10.12°E
- Vertical: 854 m (2,802 ft)
- Top elevation: 1,039 m (3,409 ft)
- Base elevation: 185 m (607 ft)
- Trails: 23 pistes: 5 nursery; 9 beginner; 6 intermediate; 3 advanced
- Longest run: 3.5 km (2.2 mi)
- Lift system: 9 total: 3 chairlifts; 2 T-bars; 3 telescopic lifts; 1 belt lift
- Lift capacity: 11,300 / hr
- Terrain parks: 1
- Snowfall: low
- Snowmaking: 80% of pistes
- Night skiing: Tue, Thu (Dec), & Fri until 8 pm, 2.6 km (1.6 mi)
- Website: Alpinco.com/kvitfjell

Kvitfjell (Norwegian: White mountain) is a ski resort in Ringebu Municipality in Innlandet county, Norway.

Developed for the 1994 Winter Olympics in Lillehammer, it is one of the most modern resorts in the world, with snowmaking on 80% of the alpine pistes. Based near the river Gudbrandsdalslågen, the resort offers 23 pistes: 5 green (nursery), 9 blue (beginner), 6 red (intermediate), and 3 black (advanced). Kvitfjell is also home to a terrain park and 120 km (75 mi) of cross-country pistes, with access to 480 km (300 mi) extra in Skei and Gålå.

== Alpine ski racing ==
=== 1994 Winter Olympics ===
Kvitfjell is probably best known for hosting the men's and women's alpine speed events at the 1994 Winter Olympics. Tommy Moe, an American of Norwegian descent, edged out home favorite Kjetil André Aamodt of Norway by 0.04 seconds in the downhill, then was edged out by Markus Wasmeier of Germany by 0.08 seconds in the Super-G.

Katja Seizinger of Germany won the women's downhill with Picabo Street of the U.S. a distant second; Diann Roffe of the U.S. took gold in the Super-G. The technical alpine events (giant slalom and slalom) were held at Hafjell.

=== World Cup ===
Kvitfjell is a regular stop on the World Cup circuit, hosting men's speed events late in the season, and debuted in March 1993. The downhill course begins just below the summit and is slightly over 3 km (1.9 mi) in length. Designed by Bernhard Russi for the 1994 Olympics, the challenging Olympiabakken course is well-regarded; after the Olympics, men's World Cup races have been held here every year since, through 2020.
