= Jeremy Nobis =

American alpine skier (1970–2023)

Personal information
- Full name: Jeremy Macarthur Nobis
- Born: August 31, 1970 Madison, Wisconsin, U.S.
- Died: April 19, 2023 (aged 52) Cedar City, Utah, U.S.
- Height: 5 ft 10 in (178 cm)
- Weight: 174 lb (79 kg)

Sport
- Sport: Skiing
Medal record
Men's alpine skiing
Representing United States
Winter Pan American Games
Bronze medal – third place	1990 Las Leñas	Giant slalom
Bronze medal – third place	1990 Las Leñas	Super-G

Jeremy Macarthur Nobis (August 31, 1970 – April 19, 2023) was an American alpine skier who competed in the 1994 Winter Olympics.

== Biography ==
Born in Madison, Wisconsin, Nobis was an older brother of Shannon Nobis. Jeremy Nobis joined the United States Ski Team after graduating from Green Mountain Valley Ski Academy. In 1988 and 1989, he won two world junior championships in giant slalom and super giant slalom.

Nobis represented the United States in Alpine skiing at the 1994 Winter Olympics, finishing ninth in the giant slalom event. He failed to finish the slalom race. Nobis had entered the FIS Alpine Ski World Cup in January 1991, finishing 7th in the giant slalom race in Adelboden. He managed one more top-10 placement, which was a 9th place in the giant slalom race in January 1993 in Veysonnaz. His last World Cup outing came in February 1995 in Furano. After leaving the World Cup circuit in 1996, Nobis turned to a career in big-mountain freeriding. For the next two decades, he made appearances in a host of ski films, including ones produced by Warren Miller, Matchstick Productions, and Teton Gravity Research.

In 2019, Nobis was imprisoned in Iron County, Utah for driving under the influence. After his release, he failed to appear at a videoconference court hearing in 2021 and a warrant was issued for his arrest; he was arrested in February 2023. Nobis died in a jail cell in Cedar City, Utah, on April 19, 2023, at the age of 52. His death was subsequently ruled a suicide.
