= Harper Phillips =

American alpine skier (born 1973)

Harper Phillips (born May 4, 1973 in Burlington, Vermont) is a former American alpine skier who competed in the men's giant slalom at the 1994 Winter Olympics.
