= Finn Aamodt =

Norwegian sports coach (born 1952)

Finn Roger Aamodt
- Born: 7 January 1952 (age 74); Norway
- Occupations: Sports coach, sports commentator
- Employer(s): Olympiatoppen, Norwegian Skating Association
- Known for: Head coach of the Norwegian alpine skiing team
- Spouse: Married
- Children: Kjetil André Aamodt (son)

Finn Roger Aamodt (born 7 January 1952) is a Norwegian sports coach.

He grew up in Gamlebyen, Oslo. He started his working career, and married in the mid-1960s. In 1971, they had a son, Kjetil André Aamodt, and had settled at Lambertseter.

Aamodt trained his own children as alpine skiers, and gradually became known nationwide for his substantial training regimes, as Kjetil André Aamodt entered the national recruit team in the late 1980s. In the 1990s and 2000s, Kjetil André Aamodt became one of the most successful alpine skiers in history, and Finn Aamodt was the head coach for the Norwegian alpine skiing team. From 1995, he was employed by Olympiatoppen.

From 2004 to 2006, Finn Aamodt was the director of sports in the Norwegian Skating Association, before returning to Olympiatoppen as head coach of technical and tactical sports. He was also involved in summer sports; among others, in the team of Andreas Thorkildsen. Finn Aamodt was also a television sports commentator.
