= Alpine skiing at the 1994 Winter Olympics – Men's downhill =

Men's downhill at the XVII Olympic Winter Games
- Alpine skiing
- Venue: Kvitfjell
- Date: 13 February 1994
- Competitors: 55 from 26 nations
- Winning time: 1:45.75

Medalists
1st place, gold medalist(s)		Tommy Moe	United States
2nd place, silver medalist(s)		Kjetil André Aamodt	Norway
3rd place, bronze medalist(s)		Ed Podivinsky	Canada

Men's Downhill
- Location: Kvitfjell; Olympiabakken
- Vertical: 838 m (2,749 ft)
- Top elevation: 1,020 m (3,346 ft)
- Base elevation: 182 m (597 ft)

The Men's Downhill competition of the Lillehammer 1994 Olympics was held at Kvitfjell on Sunday, 13 February.

The reigning world champion was Urs Lehmann and the reigning Olympic champion was Patrick Ortlieb; Franz Heinzer was the defending World Cup downhill champion and Marc Girardelli led the current season.

Tommy Moe, an American of Norwegian ancestry, edged out Kjetil André Aamodt of Norway by 0.04 seconds to take the gold medal in the downhill. Ed Podivinsky of Canada was the bronze medalist, just 0.12 seconds behind Moe. Ortlieb was fourth, Girardelli fifth, Alphand eighth, and Heinzer did not finish.

The defending champion was in the field for the first time since 1976, when 1972 champion Bernhard Russi won the silver medal. Ortlieb was just off the podium in 1994, which remains the second-best result by a defending champion. Prior to Russi, only two champions had been in the field to defend, but neither made the top ten: Henri Oreiller was 14th in 1952 and Egon Zimmermann finished 13th in 1968.

The Olympiabakken course started at an elevation of 1,020 m (3,346 ft) above sea level with a vertical drop of 838 m (2,749 ft) and a course length of 3.035 km (1.89 mi). Moe's winning time was 105.75 seconds, yielding an average course speed of 103.319 km/h (64.2 mph), with an average vertical descent rate of 7.924 m/s (26.0 ft/s).

== Results ==
The race was started at 11:00 local time, (UTC +1). At the starting gate, the skies were clear, the temperature was −15.0 °C (5 °F), and the snow condition was hard; the temperature at the finish was lower, at −16.0 °C (3 °F).

Rank	Bib	Name	Country	Time	Difference
1st place, gold medalist(s)	8	Tommy Moe	United States	1:45.75	—
2nd place, silver medalist(s)	7	Kjetil André Aamodt	Norway	1:45.79	+0.04
3rd place, bronze medalist(s)	21	Ed Podivinsky	Canada	1:45.87	+0.12
4	10	Patrick Ortlieb	Austria	1:46.01	+0.26
5	1	Marc Girardelli	Luxembourg	1:46.09	+0.34
6	2	Hannes Trinkl	Austria	1:46.22	+0.47
6	33	Nicolas Burtin	France	1:46.22	+0.47
8	13	Luc Alphand	France	1:46.25	+0.50
9	15	Atle Skårdal	Norway	1:46.29	+0.54
10	17	Jan Einar Thorsen	Norway	1:46.34	+0.59
11	26	Kyle Rasmussen	United States	1:46.35	+0.60
12	3	Peter Runggaldier	Italy	1:46.39	+0.64
13	4	Pietro Vitalini	Italy	1:46.48	+0.73
14	5	Daniel Mahrer	Switzerland	1:46.55	+0.80
15	11	Armin Assinger	Austria	1:46.68	+0.93
16	9	William Besse	Switzerland	1:46.76	+1.01
17	30	A J Kitt	United States	1:46.82	+1.07
18	19	Lasse Kjus	Norway	1:46.84	+1.09
19	14	Günther Mader	Austria	1:46.87	+1.12
20	12	Kristian Ghedina	Italy	1:46.99	+1.24
21	22	Luigi Colturi	Italy	1:47.05	+1.30
22	20	Christophe Plé	France	1:47.11	+1.36
23	24	Franco Cavegn	Switzerland	1:47.15	+1.40
24	23	Jean-Luc Crétier	France	1:47.27	+1.52
25	27	Hansjörg Tauscher	Germany	1:47.30	+1.55
26	35	Graham Bell	Great Britain	1:47.39	+1.64
27	29	Luke Sauder	Canada	1:47.45	+1.70
28	32	Martin Bell	Great Britain	1:47.49	+1.74
29	36	Jürgen Hasler	Liechtenstein	1:47.62	+1.87
30	38	Janne Leskinen	Finland	1:47.87	+2.12
31	28	Ralf Socher	Canada	1:47.93	+2.18
32	31	Fredrik Nyberg	Sweden	1:47.97	+2.22
33	41	Achim Vogt	Liechtenstein	1:47.98	+2.23
34	34	Patrik Järbyn	Sweden	1:48.05	+2.30
35	44	Miran Ravter	Slovenia	1:48.48	+2.73
36	18	Markus Wasmeier	Germany	1:48.53	+2.78
37	42	Andrey Filichkin	Russia	1:48.81	+3.06
38	37	Craig Thrasher	United States	1:48.91	+3.16
39	25	Markus Foser	Liechtenstein	1:48.93	+3.18
40	45	Marco Büchel	Liechtenstein	1:48.97	+3.22
41	40	Georges Mendes	Portugal	1:49.20	+3.45
42	39	Nils Linneberg	Chile	1:49.80	+4.05
43	49	Andrey Kolotvin	Kazakhstan	1:50.39	+4.64
44	47	Petar Dichev	Bulgaria	1:51.07	+5.32
45	51	Maríano Puricelli	Argentina	1:52.38	+6.63
46	46	Marcin Szafrański	Poland	1:52.59	+6.84
47	50	Zurab Dzhidzhishvili	Georgia	1:53.27	+7.52
48	53	Hubertus von Hohenlohe	Mexico	1:53.37	+7.62
49	48	Diego Margozzini	Chile	1:55.32	+9.57
50	55	Lothar Christian Munder	Brazil	1:56.48	+10.73
-	6	Cary Mullen	Canada	DNF	-
-	16	Franz Heinzer	Switzerland	DNF	-
-	43	Vasily Bezsmelnitsyn	Russia	DQ	-
-	52	Connor O'Brien	Estonia	DNF	-
-	54	Lamine Guèye	Senegal	DNF	-
