= Spain at the 1994 Winter Olympics =

- IOC code: ESP
- NOC: Spanish Olympic Committee
- Website: www.coe.es (in Spanish)

in Lillehammer
- Competitors: 13 (8 men, 5 women) in 4 sports
- Flag bearer: Ainhoa Ibarra
- Medals: Gold 0 Silver 0 Bronze 0 Total 0

Winter Olympics appearances (overview)
- 1936; 1948; 1952; 1956; 1960; 1964; 1968; 1972; 1976; 1980; 1984; 1988; 1992; 1994; 1998; 2002; 2006; 2010; 2014; 2018; 2022; 2026

Spain competed at the 1994 Winter Olympics in Lillehammer, Norway.

== Competitors ==
The following is the list of number of competitors in the Games.

Sport	Men	Women	Total
Alpine skiing	4	3	7
Cross-country skiing	3	0	3
Figure skating	0	1	1
Freestyle skiing	1	1	2
Total	8	5	13

== Alpine skiing ==
Men

Athlete	Event	Race 1	Race 2	Total	
Athlete	Event	Time	Time	Time	Rank
Vicente Tomas	Super-G			1:38.02	39
Xavier Ubeira	Super-G			1:37.60	38
Luis Cristobal	Super-G			1:37.31	36
Luis Cristobal	Giant Slalom	1:33.34	DNF	DNF	–
Xavier Ubeira	Giant Slalom	1:32.07	1:27.28	2:59.35	28
Xavier Ubeira	Slalom	DNF	–	DNF	–
Ovidio García	Slalom	DNF	–	DNF	–
Vicente Tomas	Slalom	1:06.71	1:06.73	2:13.44	20

Men's combined

Athlete	Downhill	Slalom		Total	
Athlete	Time	Time 1	Time 2	Total time	Rank
Ovidio García	1:46.48	DSQ	–	DSQ	–
Vicente Tomas	1:44.32	55.68	51.61	3:31.61	28
Xavier Ubeira	1:42.78	53.17	50.97	3:26.92	25

Women

Athlete	Event	Race 1	Race 2	Total	
Athlete	Event	Time	Time	Time	Rank
María José Rienda	Super-G			1:24.65	29
Ainhoa Ibarra	Super-G			1:24.50	27
Mónica Bosch	Giant Slalom	1:25.62	1:15.61	2:41.23	22
María José Rienda	Giant Slalom	1:24.62	1:14.83	2:39.45	21
Ainhoa Ibarra	Giant Slalom	1:23.36	1:13.31	2:36.67	17
María José Rienda	Slalom	DNF	–	DNF	–
Ainhoa Ibarra	Slalom	DNF	–	DNF	–
Mónica Bosch	Slalom	1:03.79	1:02.32	2:06.11	23

== Cross-country skiing ==
Men

Event	Athlete	Race	
Event	Athlete	Time	Rank
10 km C	Jordi Ribó	27:21.2	57
10 km C	Juan Jesús Gutiérrez	27:06.0	47
10 km C	Carlos Vicente	27:01.4	44
15 km pursuit^{1} F	Jordi Ribó	42:47.6	47
15 km pursuit^{1} F	Carlos Vicente	41:13.3	32
15 km pursuit^{1} F	Juan Jesús Gutiérrez	41:00.0	28
30 km F	Juan Jesús Gutiérrez	1'19:47.3	30
30 km F	Jordi Ribó	1'19:33.8	29
50 km C	Carlos Vicente	2'21:03.5	42
50 km C	Jordi Ribó	2'19:21.9	34
50 km C	Juan Jesús Gutiérrez	2'14:22.5	19

^{1} Starting delay based on 10 km results.
C = Classical style, F = Freestyle

== Figure skating ==
Women

Athlete	SP	FS	TFP	Rank
Marta Andrade	21	21	31.5	20

== Freestyle skiing ==
Men

Athlete	Event	Qualification			Final		
Athlete	Event	Time	Points	Rank	Time	Points	Rank
José Rojas	Moguls	26.36	22.49	24	did not advance		

Women

Athlete	Event	Qualification			Final		
Athlete	Event	Time	Points	Rank	Time	Points	Rank
Patricia Portillo	Moguls	53.58	9.15	24	did not advance		

== Sources ==
- Official Olympic Reports
- Olympic Winter Games 1994, full results by sports-reference.com
