= Carlos Manuel Bustos =

Argentine alpine skier (born 1974)

Personal information
- Born: 6 June 1974 (age 51); Bariloche, Argentina

Sport
- Sport: Alpine skiing

Carlos Manuel Bustos (born 6 June 1974) is an Argentine alpine skier. He competed in the men's super-G at the 1994 Winter Olympics.
