= Markus Wasmeier =

German alpine skier

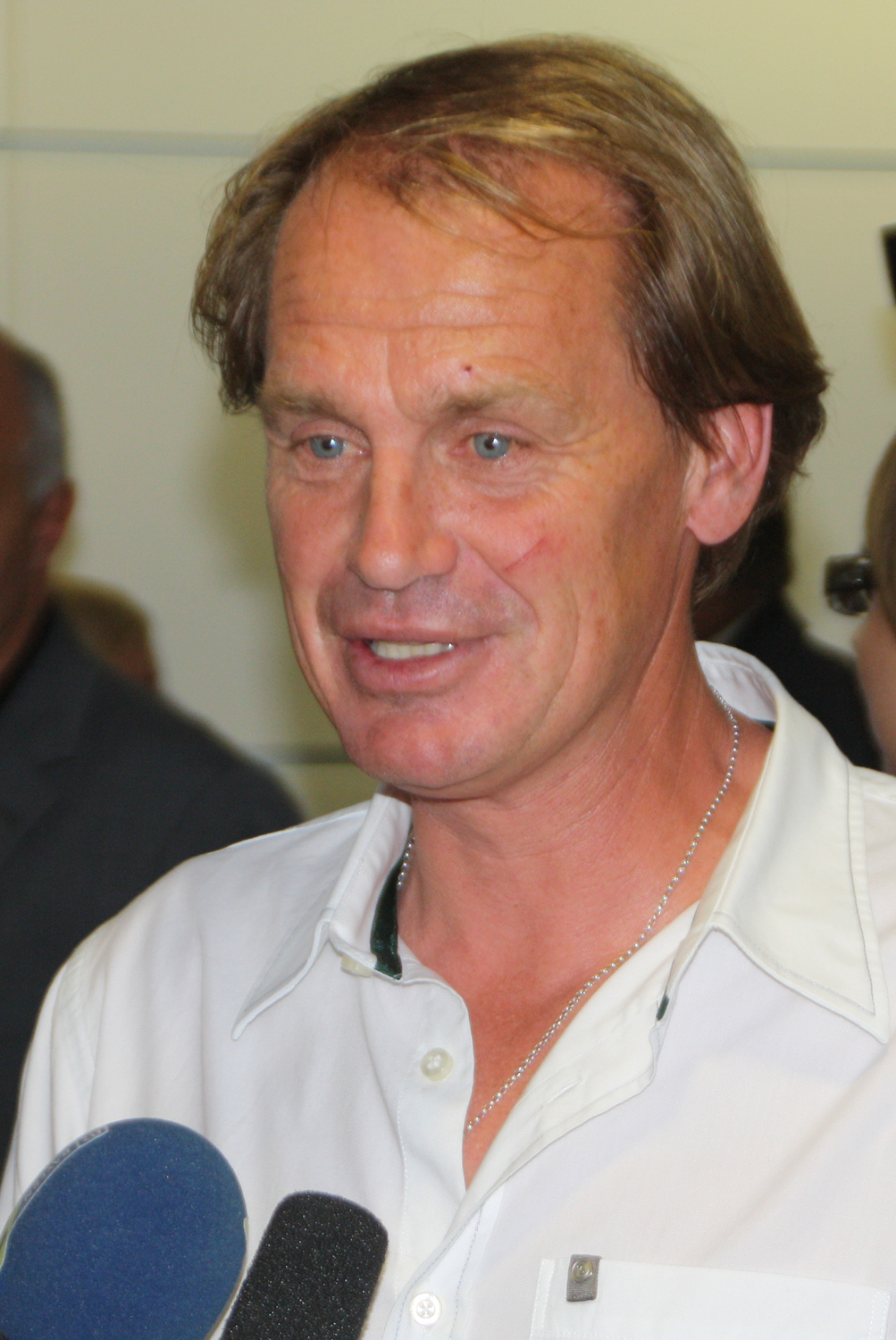
- Wasmeier in July 2011

Personal information
- Born: 9 September 1963 (age 63) Schliersee, Bavaria, West Germany
- Height: 181 cm (5 ft 11 in)
- Website: wasmeier.de

Skiing career
- Sport: Alpine skiing
- Retired: March 1994 (age 30)
- Disciplines: Downhill, super-G, giant slalom, combined
- World Cup debut: 29 January 1984 (age 20)

Olympics
- Teams: 3 - (1988, 1992, 1994)
- Medals: 2 (2 gold)

World Championships
- Teams: 5 - (1985–1993)
- Medals: 2 (1 gold)

World Cup
- Seasons: 11 - (1984–94)
- Wins: 9 - (2 DH, 6 SG, 1 K)
- Podiums: 31
- Overall titles: 0 - (3rd in 1986, 1987)
- Discipline titles: 1 - (1 SG, 1986)
Medal record
Representing Germany
Men's Alpine skiing
International alpine ski competitions
| Event | 1st | 2nd | 3rd |
|---|---|---|---|
| Olympic Games | 2 | 0 | 0 |
| World Championships | 1 | 0 | 1 |
| Total | 3 | 0 | 1 |
Olympic Games
| Gold medal – first place | 1994 Lillehammer | Giant slalom |
| Gold medal – first place | 1994 Lillehammer | Super-G |
World Championships
| Gold medal – first place | 1985 Bormio | Giant slalom |
| Bronze medal – third place | 1987 Crans Montana | Super-G |

Markus Wasmeier (German pronunciation: [ˈmaʁ.kʊs ˈvaːsˌmaɪ̯ɐ]; born 9 September 1963) is a German former World Cup alpine skier. He was World champion and two times Olympic champion.

== Career ==
At the 1985 World Championships at Bormio, Italy, he won the giant slalom at age 21, before recording a World Cup victory.

Born in Schliersee, Bavaria, West Germany, Wasmeier's first World Cup Race was on 5 February 1983, when he finished 49th in the downhill Race at St. Anton am Arlberg. He gained his first World Cup points in January 1984 by capturing 10th place in the Alpine Combined at Garmisch-Partenkirchen, and that December, he achieved his first podium in (Giant slalom at Sestiere, Italy). In a downhill race in February 1987 at Furano, Japan, he broke two vertebrae and missed the rest of the season.

Wasmeier won a total of nine World Cup races, starting with two victories on 9 February 1986, in the Combined and Super-G events at Morzine, France.

The surprising result of double Olympic gold for Wasmeier at age thirty gained him the title of 1994 "Sportsman of the Year" in Germany,

== World Cup results ==
=== Season standings ===
| Season | Age | Overall | Slalom | Giant Slalom | Super G | Downhill | Combined |
|---|---|---|---|---|---|---|---|
| 1984 | 20 | 61 | — | 27 | not awarded | — | 31 |
| 1985 | 21 | 10 | — | 9 | not awarded | 19 | 5 |
| 1986 | 22 | 3 | 41 | 8 | 1 | 14 | 2 |
| 1987 | 23 | 3 | 44 | 6 | 3 | 14 | — |
| 1988 | 24 | 6 | — | 15 | 2 | 14 | 4 |
| 1989 | 25 | 5 | — | 21 | 6 | 9 | 2 |
| 1990 | 26 | 20 | — | 29 | 9 | 17 | 3 |
| 1991 | 27 | 40 | — | — | 6 | — | 11 |
| 1992 | 28 | 7 | — | 23 | 9 | 6 | 3 |
| 1993 | 29 | 14 | 44 | 35 | 13 | 17 | 13 |
| 1994 | 30 | 25 | — | 17 | 10 | 38 | 15 |

=== Season titles ===
| Season | Discipline |
|---|---|
| 1986 | Super-G |

=== Individual races ===
9 wins (2 DH, 6 SG, 1 K)

| Season | Date | Location | Discipline |
|---|---|---|---|
| 1986 | 9 February 1986 | Morzine, France | Combined |
| 1986 | 9 February 1986 | Morzine, France | Super-G |
| 1986 | 16 March 1986 | Whistler, Canada | Super G |
| 1987 | 6 December 1986 | Val-d'Isère, France | Super-G |
| 1987 | 11 January 1987 | Garmisch, West Germany | Super G |
| 1987 | 17 January 1987 | Wengen, Switzerland | Downhill |
| 1988 | 10 January 1988 | Val-d'Isère, France | Super G |
| 1991 | 17 March 1991 | Lake Louise, Canada | Super G |
| 1992 | 11 January 1992 | Garmisch, Germany | Downhill |

== World championship results ==
| Year | Age | Slalom | Giant Slalom | Super-G | Downhill | Combined |
|---|---|---|---|---|---|---|
| 1985 | 21 | — | 1 | not run | 20 | 7 |
| 1987 | 23 | — | 13 | 3 | 9 | 5 |
| 1989 | 25 | — | 13 | 5 | 29 | 5 |
| 1991 | 27 | — | — | 13 | 24 | DNF |
| 1993 | 29 | — | 9 | canceled | 35 | 14 |

== Olympic results ==
| Year | Age | Slalom | Giant Slalom | Super-G | Downhill | Combined |
|---|---|---|---|---|---|---|
| 1988 | 24 | — | 19 | DNF | 6 | 7 |
| 1992 | 28 | — | DNF1 | 9 | 4 | 5 |
| 1994 | 30 | — | 1 | 1 | 36 | DNS SL1 |

== After racing ==
After retiring from competitive skiing, Wasmeier founded the farm and winter sport museum Bauernhof- und Wintersportmuseum Schliersee on 1 May 2007, and he has remained its curator and patron ever since. The museum provides insight into traditional Bavarian peasant life and aims to preserve old traditions by communicating them to coming generations.

In 2009, Wasmeier shared his passion for building restoration and preserving tradition with an international group of young people through his involvement with the D&F Academy (now The DO School). Wasmeier worked with an international group of young people to restore a 17th-century farmhouse in the German Alps utilizing original materials, traditional tools, wood-crafting and handicraft techniques. He remains involved with the DO School as an advisor and supporter.

From 1993 to 1994, he was a commentator for the German Television Broadcaster ARD until 2007 and from 2008 until 2014. He is a consultant in the German Skiing Federation since 2000. Married since 1991, his wife Brigitte is a South Tyrolian.

Awards
| Preceded by (Germany) Henry Maske | German Sportsman of the Year; 1994 | Succeeded by (Germany) Michael Schumacher |
