= Kjetil André Aamodt =

Norwegian alpine ski racer and TV host

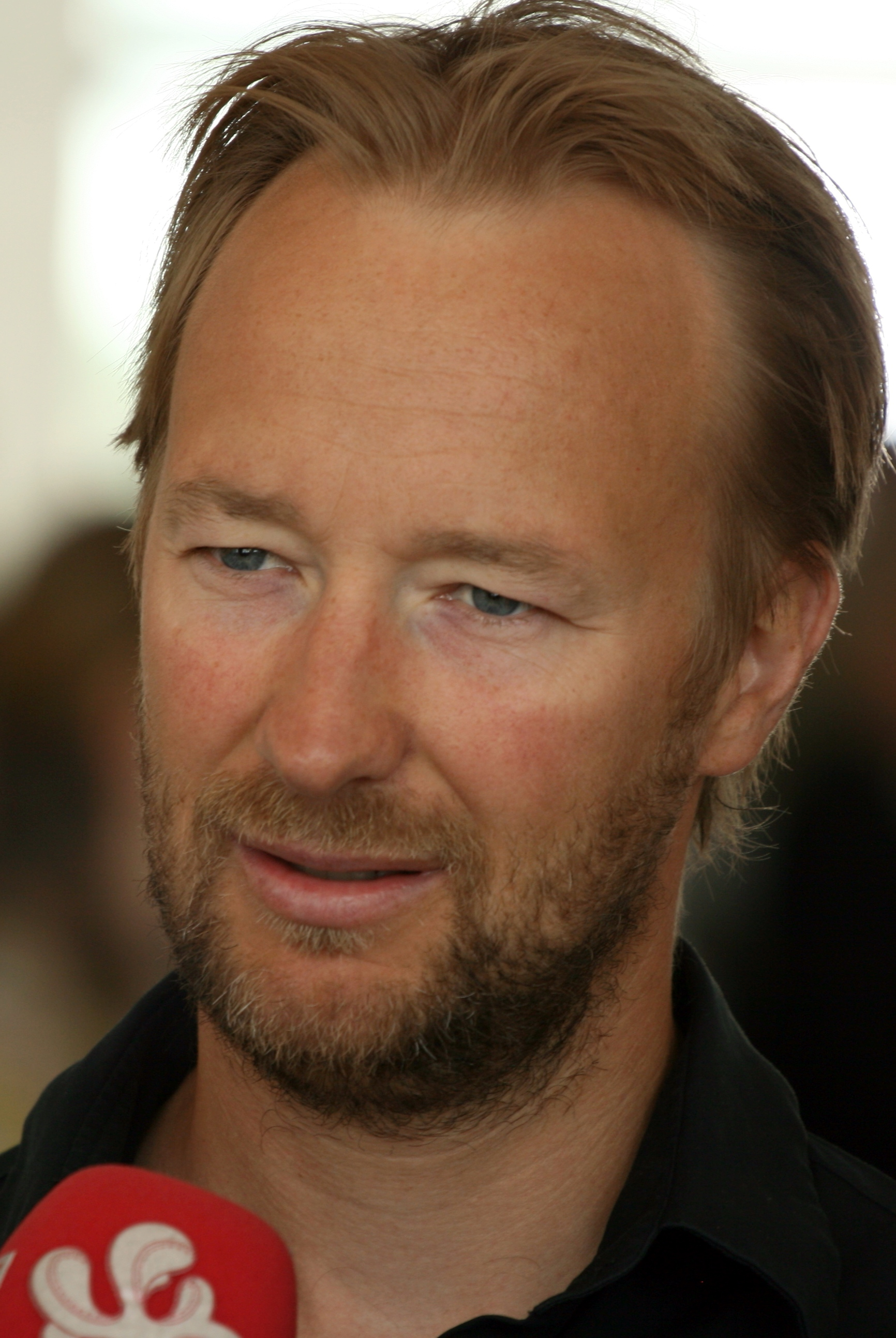
- Aamodt in June 2009

Personal information
- Born: 2 September 1971 (age 55) Oslo, Norway
- Height: 1.76 m (5 ft 9 in)
- Website: kaaa.no

Skiing career
- Sport: Alpine skiing
- Club: SK Nordstrand IF
- Retired: January 2007 (age 35)
- Disciplines: Downhill, super-G, giant slalom, slalom, combined
- World Cup debut: 22 March 1988 (age 16)

Olympics
- Teams: 5 – (1992–2006)
- Medals: 8 (4 gold)

World Championships
- Teams: 8 – (1991–2005)
- Medals: 12 (5 gold)

World Cup
- Seasons: 16 – (1990–2003, 2005–2006)
- Wins: 21
- Podiums: 64
- Overall titles: 1 – (1994)
- Discipline titles: 3 – (1 SG, 1 GS, 1 SL)
Medal record
Men's alpine skiing
Representing Norway
World Cup race podiums
Event	1st	2nd	3rd
Downhill	1	3	4
Super-G	5	2	2
Giant	6	4	7
Slalom	1	6	5
Parallel	0	1	0
Combined	8	7	2
Total	21	23	20
International alpine ski competitions
Event	1st	2nd	3rd
Olympic Games	4	2	2
World Championships	5	4	3
Total	9	6	5
Olympic Games
Gold medal – first place	1992 Albertville	Super-G
Gold medal – first place	2002 Salt Lake City	Super-G
Gold medal – first place	2002 Salt Lake City	Combined
Gold medal – first place	2006 Turin	Super-G
Silver medal – second place	1994 Lillehammer	Downhill
Silver medal – second place	1994 Lillehammer	Combined
Bronze medal – third place	1992 Albertville	Giant slalom
Bronze medal – third place	1994 Lillehammer	Super-G
World Championships
Gold medal – first place	1993 Morioka	Giant slalom
Gold medal – first place	1993 Morioka	Slalom
Gold medal – first place	1997 Sestriere	Combined
Gold medal – first place	1999 Vail	Combined
Gold medal – first place	2001 St. Anton	Combined
Silver medal – second place	1991 Saalbach	Super-G
Silver medal – second place	1993 Morioka	Combined
Silver medal – second place	2001 St. Anton	Giant slalom
Silver medal – second place	2003 St. Moritz	Downhill
Bronze medal – third place	1996 Sierra Nevada	Super-G
Bronze medal – third place	1999 Vail	Downhill
Bronze medal – third place	2003 St. Moritz	Combined

Kjetil André Aamodt (born 2 September 1971) is a former World Cup alpine ski racer from Norway, a champion in the Olympics, World Championships, and World Cup. He is one of the most successful alpine ski racers from Norway.

== Biography ==
Born in Oslo to Finn Aamodt (former head coach of Norway's alpine skiing team), Aamodt is the only alpine skier to win 8 Olympic medals, and has won 5 World Championship gold medals as well as 21 individual World Cup events. Described as an all-round alpine skier, Aamodt participated in all alpine skiing disciplines in the World Cup and World Championships, and is one of only five male alpine skiers to have won a World Cup race in all five disciplines.

Aamodt's combined career total of twenty World Championship and Olympic medals is an all-time best. He is the second-youngest male alpine skier to win an Olympic gold medal (age 20 in 1992; Toni Sailer was two months younger in 1956). Until 2014, he was also the oldest alpine skier to win an Olympic gold medal. For almost six years, Aamodt led the all-time Marathon World Cup ranking, with a total of 13,252 points earned from 1989 to 2006 – until 14 March 2012, when Austrian Benjamin Raich overtook him with a fifth place in the downhill at the 2012 World Cup final in Schladming to total 13,281 points, earned from 1998. Another all-time best is his 231 World Cup top-ten results, 9 ahead of Benjamin Raich.

By winning the super-G race at the 2006 Olympics, Aamodt became the first male alpine skier to win four gold medals in the Olympics. (Toni Sailer and Jean-Claude Killy both swept the three alpine events at a single Olympics, and Alberto Tomba won three gold medals over two Olympics.)

Aamodt had 19 Olympic and World Championship medals stolen from him. The medals were taken in August 2003 by burglars who broke into a safe in his father's home. The five-time world champion and winner of four Olympic gold medals later revealed they were recovered by an anonymous helper over the internet.

Aamodt announced the conclusion of his career on live television on 6 January 2007, with hundreds of fellow athletes in attendance, at the Norwegian Sports Gala (Idrettsgallaen) where he had been selected as awardee of the year for 2006.

Aamodt now runs a ski race camp in Gaustablikk, Norway, and does public speaking.

== Legacy ==
In February 2015, Aamodt and Lasse Kjus were selected as recipients of the Legends of Honor by the Vail Valley Foundation, and inducted into the International Ski Racing Hall of Fame.

== World Cup results ==
=== Season standings ===
Season	Age	Overall	Slalom	Giant slalom	Super-G	Downhill	Combined
1990	18	39	–	14	19	—	—
1991	19	17	20	10	8	—	—
1992	20	13	26	11	5	–	17
1993	21	2	5	1	1	28	3
1994	22	1	9	2	4	10	1
1995	23	5	14	4	19	13	4
1996	24	10	18	14	8	44	7
1997	25	2	6	2	12	24	1
1998	26	4	13	9	21	12	2
1999	27	2	4	4	9	5	1
2000	28	2	1	9	13	13	1
2001	29	7	7	16	10	36	3
2002	30	2	9	16	6	6	1
2003	31	3	23	14	4	7	2
2004	32	broken ankle in October 2003, out for season					
2005	33	26	–	40	14	28	—
2006	34	8	–	–	5	6	5

=== Season titles ===
1 overall, 1 super-G, 1 giant slalom, 1 slalom

Season	Discipline
1993	Super-G
1993	Giant slalom
1994	Overall
1994	Combined^
1997	Combined^
1999	Combined^
2000	Slalom
2000	Combined^
2002	Combined^

^official season title in the combined discipline
was not awarded until the 2007 season

=== Race victories ===
- 21 wins (1 downhill, 5 super-G, 6 giant slalom, 1 slalom, 8 combined)
- 64 podiums, 231 top tens (first skier of all time in this ranking).

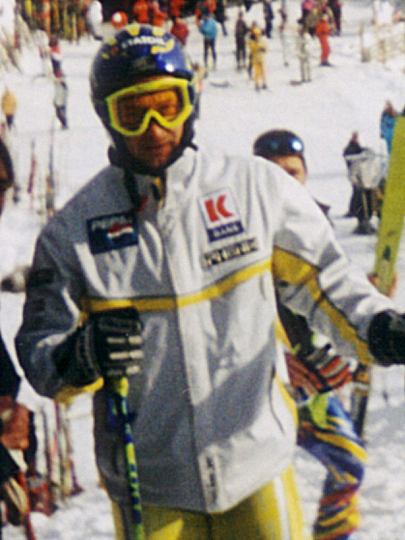
Aamodt at Kitzbühel in January 2000

Season	Date	Location	Race
1992	15 Mar 1992	Aspen, USA	Super-G
1993	28 Nov 1992	Sestriere, Italy	Giant slalom
1993	7 Mar 1993	Aspen, USA	Super-G
1993	21 Mar 1993	Kvitfjell, Norway	Super-G
1993	23 Mar 1993	Oppdal, Norway	Giant slalom
1993	26 Mar 1993	Åre, Sweden	Super-G
1993	27 Mar 1993	Åre, Sweden	Giant slalom
1994	11 Jan 1994	Hinterstoder, Austria	Giant slalom
1994	29 Jan 1994	Chamonix, France	Downhill
1994	30 Jan 1994	Chamonix, France	Combined
1994	19 Mar 1994	Vail, USA	Giant slalom
1996	7 Mar 1996	Kvitfjell, Norway	Super-G
1997	14 Jan 1997	Adelboden, Switzerland	Giant slalom
1998	25 Jan 1998	Kitzbühel, Austria	Combined
1999	24 Jan 1999	Kitzbühel, Austria	Combined
2000	9 Jan 2000	Chamonix, France	Combined
2000	16 Jan 2000	Wengen, Switzerland	Slalom
2000	23 Jan 2000	Kitzbühel, Austria	Combined
2002	13 Jan 2002	Wengen, Switzerland	Combined
2002	20 Jan 2002	Kitzbühel, Austria	Combined
2003	19 Jan 2003	Wengen, Switzerland	Combined

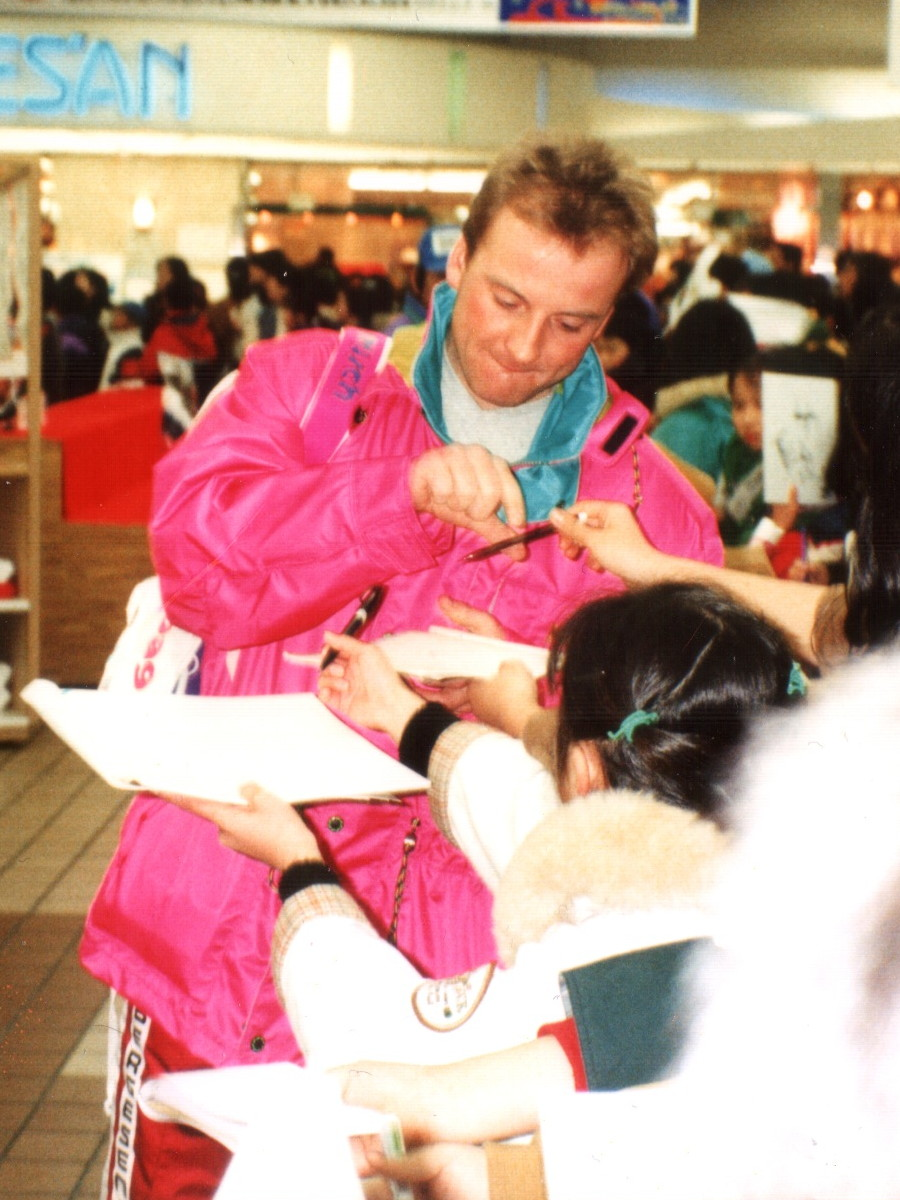
Kjetil Andre Aamodt in Morioka

== World Championships results ==
Year	Age	Slalom	Giant slalom	Super-G	Downhill	Combined
1991	19	12	–	2	–	–
1993	21	1	1	cancelled	–	2
1996	24	8	11	3	27	6
1997	25	DNF2	6	8	9	1
1999	27	7	DNF2	9	3	1
2001	29	7	2	18	DNS	1
2003	31	9	24	5	2	3
2005	33	14	–	22	23	DSQ

== Olympic results ==
Year	Age	Slalom	Giant slalom	Super-G	Downhill	Combined
1992	20	DNF2	3	1	26	—
1994	22	DNF2	12	3	2	2
1998	26	—	DNF1	5	13	—
2002	30	6	7	1	4	1
2006	34	—	—	1	4	DNS

== See also ==
- List of multiple Olympic gold medalists

Awards
Preceded by Marit Bjørgen	Norwegian Sportsperson of the Year; 2006	Succeeded by Aksel Lund Svindal
