= Patricia Chauvet =

French alpine skier (born 1967)

Medal record

Women's alpine skiing

World Championships
Silver medal – second place	1996 Sierra Nevada	Slalom

Patricia Chauvet (born 11 May 1967 in Villeneuve-Saint-Georges, Val-de-Marne) is a retired French alpine skier. She competed at four Winter Olympics.

== World Cup victories ==
Date	Location	Race
24 January 1993	(Austria) Haus	Slalom
