= Anthony Huguet =

Australian alpine skier (born 1973)

Personal information
- Nationality: Australian
- Born: 22 January 1973 (age 52); Annecy, France

Sport
- Sport: Alpine skiing

Anthony Huguet (born 22 January 1973) is an Australian alpine skier. He competed in two events at the 1994 Winter Olympics.
