= Spencer Pession =

British alpine skier (born 1972)

Spenser Pession (born 19 January 1972) is a British former alpine skier who competed in the 1994 Winter Olympics.
