= Ovidio García =

Spanish alpine skier (born 1968)

Ovidio García (born 8 May 1968) is a Spanish former alpine skier who competed in the 1992 Winter Olympics and in the 1994 Winter Olympics.
