= Bill Gaylord =

British alpine skier (born 1967)

Bill Gaylord (born 4 April 1967 in Lakenheath, Suffolk) is a British former alpine skier who competed in the 1992 Winter Olympics and in the 1994 Winter Olympics.
