= Luis Cristobal =

Spanish alpine skier (born 1970)

Luis Alberto Cristóbal Gallardo (born 15 December 1970) is a Spanish former alpine skier who competed in the 1994 Winter Olympics.
