= Mika Marila =

Finnish alpine skier (born 1973)

Mika Marila (born 9 February 1973 in Janakkala) is a Finnish former alpine skier who competed in the 1994 Winter Olympics and 1998 Winter Olympics.
