= Tobias Hellman =

Swedish alpine skier

Personal information
- Nationality: Sweden
- Born: 16 January 1973 (age 53) Lidingö, Sweden

Sport
- Sport: Skiing

Tobias Hellman (born 16 January 1973) is a Swedish former alpine skier. He competed in the 1994 Winter Olympics.

During the 1992 World Junior Alpine Skiing Championships in Maribor, Slovenia he won the men's slalom, Super-G and Alpine combined skiing events, ended up second in giant slalom and third in the downhill skiing event.
