= Vasily Bezsmelnitsyn =

Russian alpine skier (born 1975)

Vasily Bezsmelnitsyn (born 18 January 1975) is a Russian former alpine skier who competed in the 1994 Winter Olympics and 1998 Winter Olympics. He received the international master of sports status in 1994.

After the end of his sports career, he became a coach.
