= Lyubomir Popov =

Bulgarian alpine skier (born 1967)

Personal information
- Nationality: Bulgarian
- Born: 15 June 1967 (age 59) Samokov, Bulgaria

Sport
- Sport: Alpine skiing

Lyubomir Popov (Bulgarian: Любомир Попов, born 15 June 1967) is a Bulgarian alpine skier. He competed at the 1988, 1992, 1994 and the 1998 Winter Olympics.
