= Vicente Tomás =

Spanish alpine skier (born 1969)

Vicente Tomas (born 30 September 1969) is a Spanish former alpine skier who competed in the 1992 Winter Olympics and in the 1994 Winter Olympics.
