= 1993–94 FIS Alpine Ski World Cup =

International sports competition

FIS Alpine Ski World Cup 1993/94
Discipline	Men	Women
Overall	(Norway) Kjetil André Aamodt	(Switzerland) Vreni Schneider
Downhill	(Luxembourg) Marc Girardelli	(Germany) Katja Seizinger
Super G	(Norway) Jan Einar Thorsen	(Germany) Katja Seizinger
Giant Slalom	(Austria) Christian Mayer	(Austria) Anita Wachter
Slalom	(Italy) Alberto Tomba	(Switzerland) Vreni Schneider
Nations Cup	Austria	Germany
- Nations Cup overall: Austria

Competition
Locations	21	15
Individual	35	34

The 28th World Cup season began in late October 1993 in Sölden, Austria, and concluded in March 1994 at the World Cup finals at Vail in the United States. The overall champions were Kjetil André Aamodt of Norway (his first) and Vreni Schneider of Switzerland (her second).

A break in the schedule in February was for the 1994 Winter Olympics in Lillehammer, Norway. This was a shift by the International Olympic Committee to have the Winter Olympics offset from the Summer Olympics, although keeping each on four-year schedules. As a result, this Winter Olympics took place just two years after the 1992 Winter Olympics in Albertville, France.

== Calendar ==
=== Men ===
Event Key: DH – Downhill, SL – Slalom, GS – Giant Slalom, SG – Super Giant Slalom, KB – Combined
Race	Season	Date	Place	Type	Winner	Second	Third
794	1	30 October 1993	(Austria) Sölden	GS _{205}	(France) Franck Piccard	(Sweden) Fredrik Nyberg	(Norway) Kjetil André Aamodt
795	2	27 November 1993	(United States) Park City	GS _{206}	(Austria) Günther Mader	(Italy) Alberto Tomba	(Norway) Kjetil André Aamodt
796	3	28 November 1993	(United States) Park City	SL _{239}	(Austria) Thomas Stangassinger	(Slovenia) Jure Košir	(Norway) Finn Christian Jagge
797	4	5 December 1993	(Canada) Stoneham	SL _{240}	(Italy) Alberto Tomba	(Austria) Thomas Stangassinger	(Slovenia) Jure Košir
798	5	12 December 1993	(France) Val d'Isère	SG _{053}	(Austria) Günther Mader	(Norway) Kjetil André Aamodt	(United States) Tommy Moe
799	6	13 December 1993	(France) Val d'Isère	GS _{207}	(Austria) Christian Mayer	(Germany) Tobias Barnerssoi	(Switzerland) Michael von Grünigen
800	7	14 December 1993	(Italy) Sestriere	SL _{241}	(Italy) Alberto Tomba	(Austria) Thomas Stangassinger	(Norway) Ole Kristian Furuseth
801	8	17 December 1993	(Italy) Val Gardena	DH _{234}	(Liechtenstein) Markus Foser	(Austria) Werner Franz	(Luxembourg) Marc Girardelli
802	9	18 December 1993	(Italy) Val Gardena	DH _{235}	(Austria) Patrick Ortlieb	(Switzerland) Daniel Mahrer	(France) Jean-Luc Crétier
803	10	19 December 1993	(Italy) Alta Badia	GS _{208}	(Switzerland) Steve Locher	(Italy) Alberto Tomba	(Austria) Christian Mayer
804	11	20 December 1993	(Italy) Madonna di Campiglio	SL _{242}	(Slovenia) Jure Košir	(Italy) Alberto Tomba	(Norway) Finn Christian Jagge
805	12	22 December 1993	(Austria) Lech am Arlberg	SG _{054}	(Austria) Hannes Trinkl	(Italy) Werner Perathoner	(Austria) Armin Assinger
806	13	29 December 1993	(Italy) Bormio	DH _{236}	(Austria) Hannes Trinkl	(Luxembourg) Marc Girardelli	(United States) Tommy Moe
807	14	6 January 1994	(Austria) Saalbach-Hinterglemm	DH _{237}	(Canada) Ed Podivinsky	(Canada) Cary Mullen	(Norway) Atle Skårdal
808	15	8 January 1994	(Slovenia) Kranjska Gora	GS _{209}	(Sweden) Fredrik Nyberg	(Italy) Matteo Belfrond	(Germany) Tobias Barnerssoi
809	16	9 January 1994	(Slovenia) Kranjska Gora	SL _{243}	(Norway) Finn Christian Jagge	(Norway) Ole Kristian Furuseth	(Sweden) Thomas Fogdö
810	17	11 January 1994	(Austria) Hinterstoder	GS _{210}	(Norway) Kjetil André Aamodt	(Austria) Christian Mayer	(Austria) Richard Kröll
811	18	15 January 1994	(Austria) Kitzbühel	DH _{238}	(Austria) Patrick Ortlieb	(Luxembourg) Marc Girardelli	(Switzerland) William Besse
812	19	16 January 1994	(Austria) Kitzbühel	SL _{244}	(Austria) Thomas Stangassinger	(Austria) Thomas Sykora	(Italy) Alberto Tomba
813	20	16 January 1994	(Austria) Kitzbühel	KB _{066}	(Norway) Lasse Kjus	(Norway) Kjetil André Aamodt	(Austria) Günther Mader
814	21	18 January 1994	(Switzerland) Crans-Montana	GS _{211}	(Norway) Jan Einar Thorsen	(Slovenia) Mitja Kunc	(Austria) Rainer Salzgeber
815	22	22 January 1994	(Switzerland) Wengen	DH _{239}	(Switzerland) William Besse	(Luxembourg) Marc Girardelli (Italy) Peter Runggaldier	
816	23	23 January 1994	(Switzerland) Wengen	SG _{055}	(Luxembourg) Marc Girardelli	(Norway) Jan Einar Thorsen	(Norway) Atle Skårdal
817	24	29 January 1994	(France) Chamonix	DH _{240}	(Norway) Kjetil André Aamodt	(France) Jean-Luc Crétier	(Austria) Hannes Trinkl
818	25	30 January 1994	(France) Chamonix	SL _{245}	(Italy) Alberto Tomba	(Sweden) Thomas Fogdö	(Austria) Thomas Sykora (Slovenia) Jure Košir
819	26	30 January 1994	(France) Chamonix	KB _{067}	(Norway) Kjetil André Aamodt	(Norway) Lasse Kjus	(Norway) Harald Strand Nilsen
820	27	6 February 1994	(Germany) Garmisch-Partenkirchen	SL _{246}	(Italy) Alberto Tomba	(Sweden) Thomas Fogdö	(Slovenia) Jure Košir
1994 Winter Olympics (13–27 February)
821	28	4 March 1994	(United States) Aspen	DH _{241}	(Austria) Hannes Trinkl	(Canada) Cary Mullen	(Luxembourg) Marc Girardelli
822	29	5 March 1994	(United States) Aspen	DH _{242}	(Canada) Cary Mullen	(Norway) Atle Skårdal	(Italy) Pietro Vitalini
823	30	6 March 1994	(United States) Aspen	GS _{212}	(Sweden) Fredrik Nyberg	(Austria) Christian Mayer	(Italy) Matteo Belfrond
824	31	12 March 1994	(Canada) Whistler	DH _{243}	(Norway) Atle Skårdal	(Austria) Hannes Trinkl	(United States) Tommy Moe
825	32	13 March 1994	(Canada) Whistler	SG _{056}	(United States) Tommy Moe	(Luxembourg) Marc Girardelli	(Italy) Werner Perathoner
826	33	16 March 1994	(United States) Vail	DH _{244}	(Switzerland) William Besse	(Austria) Hannes Trinkl	(Austria) Patrick Ortlieb (United States) Tommy Moe
827	34	17 March 1994	(United States) Vail	SG _{057}	(Norway) Jan Einar Thorsen	(Norway) Lasse Kjus	(Austria) Hans Knauss
828	35	19 March 1994	(United States) Vail	GS _{213}	(Norway) Kjetil André Aamodt	(Austria) Christian Mayer	(Switzerland) Steve Locher

=== Ladies ===
Event Key: DH – Downhill, SL – Slalom, GS – Giant Slalom, SG – Super Giant Slalom, KB – Combined
Race	Season	Date	Place	Type	Winner	Second	Third
736	1	31 October 1993	(Austria) Sölden	GS _{201}	(Austria) Anita Wachter	(France) Sophie Lefranc	(France) Carole Merle
737	2	26 November 1993	(Italy) Santa Caterina	GS _{202}	(Austria) Anita Wachter	(Switzerland) Vreni Schneider	(Austria) Ulrike Maier
738	3	27 November 1993	(Italy) Santa Caterina	GS _{203}	(Austria) Ulrike Maier	(Austria) Anita Wachter	(Sweden) Pernilla Wiberg
739	4	28 November 1993	(Italy) Santa Caterina	SL _{231}	(Switzerland) Vreni Schneider	(Austria) Anita Wachter	(Slovenia) Urška Hrovat
740	5	4 December 1993	(France) Tignes	DH _{198}	(Canada) Kate Pace	(Germany) Katja Seizinger	(Germany) Regina Häusl
741	6	5 December 1993	(France) Tignes	GS _{204}	(Italy) Deborah Compagnoni	(Austria) Anita Wachter	(Sweden) Pernilla Wiberg
742	7	11 December 1993	(Switzerland) Veysonnaz	GS _{205}	(Italy) Deborah Compagnoni	(Germany) Martina Ertl	(Switzerland) Vreni Schneider
743	8	12 December 1993	(Switzerland) Veysonnaz	SL _{232}	(Sweden) Pernilla Wiberg	(Italy) Morena Gallizio	(Switzerland) Christine von Grünigen
744	9	18 December 1993	(Austria) St. Anton	DH _{199}	(Austria) Anja Haas	(Austria) Renate Götschl	(Japan) Emi Kawabata
745	10	19 December 1993	(Austria) St. Anton	SL _{233}	(Switzerland) Vreni Schneider	(Sweden) Pernilla Wiberg	(Sweden) Kristina Andersson
746	11	19 December 1993	(Austria) St. Anton	KB _{059}	(Austria) Renate Götschl	(Sweden) Pernilla Wiberg	(Italy) Bibiana Perez
747	12	22 December 1993	(Austria) Flachau	SG _{050}	(Slovenia) Katja Koren	(Italy) Bibiana Perez	(Germany) Katja Seizinger
748	13	5 January 1994	(France) Morzine	GS _{206}	(Italy) Deborah Compagnoni	(Austria) Anita Wachter	(United States) Heidi Voelker
749	14	6 January 1994	(France) Morzine	SL _{234}	(Sweden) Pernilla Wiberg	(Switzerland) Vreni Schneider	(France) Patricia Chauvet
750	15	9 January 1994	(Austria) Altenmarkt-Zauchensee	SL _{235}	(Switzerland) Vreni Schneider	(Sweden) Pernilla Wiberg	(France) Beatrice Filliol
751	16	14 January 1994	(Italy) Cortina d'Ampezzo	DH _{200}	(Germany) Katja Seizinger	(Austria) Veronika Stallmaier	(Canada) Kate Pace
752	17	15 January 1994	(Italy) Cortina d'Ampezzo	SG _{051}	(Germany) Katja Seizinger	(Austria) Ulrike Maier	(Canada) Kerrin Lee-Gartner
753	18	16 January 1994	(Italy) Cortina d'Ampezzo	GS _{207}	(Austria) Anita Wachter	(Italy) Deborah Compagnoni	(France) Leila Piccard
754	19	17 January 1994	(Italy) Cortina d'Ampezzo	SG _{052}	(Sweden) Pernilla Wiberg (Slovenia) Alenka Dovžan		(Austria) Ulrike Maier
755	20	21 January 1994	(Slovenia) Maribor	GS _{208}	(Austria) Ulrike Maier	(Switzerland) Vreni Schneider	(Germany) Katja Seizinger
756	21	22 January 1994	(Slovenia) Maribor	SL _{236}	(Slovenia) Urška Hrovat	(Switzerland) Vreni Schneider	(Norway) Marianne Kjørstad
757	22	23 January 1994	(Slovenia) Maribor	SL _{237}	(Switzerland) Vreni Schneider	(Sweden) Pernilla Wiberg	(Slovenia) Urška Hrovat
758	23	29 January 1994	(Germany) Garmisch-Partenkirchen	DH _{201}	(Italy) Isolde Kostner	(France) Mélanie Suchet	(Canada) Michelle Ruthven
759	24	2 February 1994	(Spain) Sierra Nevada	DH _{202}	(United States) Hilary Lindh	(France) Mélanie Suchet	(Italy) Isolde Kostner
760	25	5 February 1994	(Spain) Sierra Nevada	SL _{238}	(Switzerland) Vreni Schneider	(Sweden) Pernilla Wiberg	(Italy) Deborah Compagnoni
761	26	5 February 1994	(Spain) Sierra Nevada	KB _{060}	(Sweden) Pernilla Wiberg	(Switzerland) Vreni Schneider	(Italy) Bibiana Perez
762	27	6 February 1994	(Spain) Sierra Nevada	SG _{053}	(Germany) Hilde Gerg	(Italy) Isolde Kostner	(Germany) Katharina Gutensohn
1994 Winter Olympics (13–27 February)
763	28	6 March 1994	(Canada) Whistler	DH _{203}	(Germany) Katja Seizinger	(Sweden) Pernilla Wiberg	(Canada) Michelle Ruthven
764	29	9 March 1994	(United States) Mammoth Mountain	SG _{054}	(Germany) Katja Seizinger	(Italy) Bibiana Perez	(Germany) Hilde Gerg
765	30	10 March 1994	(United States) Mammoth Mountain	SL _{239}	(Switzerland) Vreni Schneider	(Slovenia) Katja Koren	(Germany) Martina Ertl
766	31	16 March 1994	(United States) Vail	DH _{204}	(Germany) Katja Seizinger	(Canada) Kate Pace	(Switzerland) Vreni Schneider
767	32	17 March 1994	(United States) Vail	SG _{055}	(United States) Diann Roffe-Steinrotter	(Germany) Katja Seizinger	(Austria) Anita Wachter
768	33	19 March 1994	(United States) Vail	GS _{209}	(Germany) Martina Ertl	(Switzerland) Vreni Schneider	(Norway) Anne Berge
769	34	20 March 1994	(United States) Vail	SL _{240}	(Switzerland) Vreni Schneider	(Slovenia) Katja Koren	(Germany) Martina Ertl

== Men ==
=== Overall ===
see complete table

In Men's Overall World Cup 1993/94 all results count.

Place	Name	Country	Total	DH	SG	GS	SL	KB
1	Kjetil André Aamodt	Norway	1392	296	207	494	215	180
2	Marc Girardelli	Luxembourg	1007	556	275	122	54	0
3	Alberto Tomba	Italy	822	0	0	282	540	0
4	Günther Mader	Austria	820	65	202	295	176	82
5	Hannes Trinkl	Austria	701	536	165	0	0	0
6	Jan Einar Thorsen	Norway	657	86	280	291	0	0
7	Lasse Kjus	Norway	651	83	194	76	118	180
8	Tommy Moe	United States	650	308	242	0	0	100
9	Atle Skårdal	Norway	641	399	202	0	0	40
10	Cary Mullen	Canada	535	461	74	0	0	0
11	Christian Mayer	Austria	533	0	0	496	37	0
12	Patrick Ortlieb	Austria	529	488	41	0	0	0
13	Franck Piccard	France	516	62	40	414	0	0
14	William Besse	Switzerland	515	446	69	0	0	0
15	Jure Košir	Slovenia	483	0	0	62	421	0
16	Bernhard Gstrein	Austria	472	0	0	204	268	0
17	Thomas Stangassinger	Austria	452	0	0	0	452	0
18	Daniel Mahrer	Switzerland	443	302	141	0	0	0
19	Michael von Grünigen	Switzerland	441	0	0	351	90	0
20	Fredrik Nyberg	Sweden	434	0	50	384	0	0

=== Downhill ===
see complete table

In Men's Downhill World Cup 1993/94 all results count. Marc Girardelli won the cup without winning a single competition.

Place	Name	Country	Total	8 (Italy)	9 (Italy)	13 (Italy)	14 (Austria)	18 (Austria)	22 (Switzerland)	24 (France)	28 (United States)	29 (United States)	31 (Canada)	33 (United States)
1	Marc Girardelli	Luxembourg	556	60	20	80	50	80	80	32	60	22	36	36
2	Hannes Trinkl	Austria	536	36	-	100	-	40	40	60	100	-	80	80
3	Patrick Ortlieb	Austria	488	40	100	45	36	100	26	29	15	13	24	60
4	Cary Mullen	Canada	461	22	36	24	80	-	32	10	80	100	45	32
5	William Besse	Switzerland	446	4	26	14	15	60	100	40	29	18	40	100
6	Atle Skårdal	Norway	399	-	10	20	60	26	36	22	45	80	100	-
7	Ed Podivinsky	Canada	313	9	-	18	100	-	13	24	36	50	18	45
8	Tommy Moe	United States	308	8	15	60	32	32	12	18	-	11	60	60
9	Daniel Mahrer	Switzerland	302	26	80	22	-	36	18	20	26	16	29	29
10	Kjetil André Aamodt	Norway	296	-	32	-	26	15	45	100	24	15	15	24
11	Pietro Vitalini	Italy	254	14	40	50	11	-	29	14	36	60	-	-
12	Peter Runggaldier	Italy	248	-	16	32	-	18	80	2	20	24	16	40
13	Jean-Luc Crétier	France	231	-	60	9	22	16	-	80	-	32	12	-
14	Luc Alphand	France	227	-	-	29	45	14	15	36	-	26	36	26
15	Franco Cavegn	Switzerland	218	-	13	1	3	45	10	26	40	40	20	20
16	Franz Heinzer	Switzerland	212	-	4	2	24	-	-	15	50	45	50	22
17	Markus Foser	Liechtenstein	192	100	22	-	-	13	-	-	18	36	3	-

=== Super G ===
see complete table

In Men's Super G World Cup 1993/94 all results count. Jan Einar Thorsen won the cup with only one race win. All races were won by a different athlete.

Place	Name	Country	Total	5 (France)	12 (Austria)	23 (Switzerland)	32 (Canada)	34 (United States)
1	Jan Einar Thorsen	Norway	280	50	18	80	32	100
2	Marc Girardelli	Luxembourg	274	24	45	100	80	26
3	Tommy Moe	United States	242	60	16	26	100	40
4	Kjetil André Aamodt	Norway	207	80	32	-	45	50
5	Atle Skårdal	Norway	202	40	40	60	26	36
	Günther Mader	Austria	202	100	26	22	32	22
7	Lasse Kjus	Norway	194	10	22	32	50	80
8	Hannes Trinkl	Austria	165	5	100	40	-	20
9	Hans Knauß	Austria	152	12	26	36	18	60
10	Markus Wasmeier	Germany	141	36	50	45	10	-
	Daniel Mahrer	Switzerland	141	45	-	29	22	45

=== Giant Slalom ===
see complete table

In Men's Giant Slalom World Cup 1993/94 all results count. Christian Mayer won the cup with only one race win.

Place	Name	Country	Total	1 (Austria)	2 (United States)	6 (France)	10 (Italy)	15 (Slovenia)	17 (Austria)	21 (Switzerland)	30 (United States)	35 (United States)
1	Christian Mayer	Austria	496	-	26	100	60	50	80	20	80	80
2	Kjetil André Aamodt	Norway	494	60	60	36	32	29	100	45	32	100
3	Franck Piccard	France	414	100	50	50	45	11	29	29	50	50
4	Fredrik Nyberg	Sweden	384	80	-	16	40	100	26	22	100	-
5	Steve Locher	Switzerland	356	26	45	26	100	32	15	36	16	60
6	Michael von Grünigen	Switzerland	351	40	40	60	36	36	50	18	26	45
7	Tobias Barnerssoi	Germany	308	16	29	80	26	60	32	10	29	26
8	Günther Mader	Austria	295	45	100	-	50	45	-	26	-	29
9	Matteo Belfrond	Italy	293	36	22	18	18	80	11	8	60	40
10	Jan Einar Thorsen	Norway	291	12	20	45	22	16	20	100	24	32

=== Slalom ===
see complete table

In Men's Slalom World Cup 1993/94 all results count. Alberto Tomba won his third Slalom World Cup.

Place	Name	Country	Total	3 (United States)	4 (Canada)	7 (Italy)	11 (Italy)	16 (Slovenia)	19 (Austria)	25 (France)	27 (Germany)
1	Alberto Tomba	Italy	540	-	100	100	80	-	60	100	100
2	Thomas Stangassinger	Austria	452	100	80	80	45	-	100	18	29
3	Jure Košir	Slovenia	421	80	60	32	100	-	29	60	60
4	Finn Christian Jagge	Norway	389	61	50	50	60	100	24	45	-
5	Thomas Fogdö	Sweden	352	-	32	-	50	60	50	80	80
6	Bernhard Gstrein	Austria	268	50	40	45	-	26	45	22	40
	Thomas Sykora	Austria	268	-	36	-	15	45	80	60	32
8	Peter Roth	Germany	248	22	24	40	10	50	16	36	50
9	Kjetil André Aamodt	Norway	215	40	45	36	26	40	18	10	-
10	Ole Kristian Furuseth	Norway	211	7	-	60	32	80	32	-	-

=== Combined ===
see complete table

In Men's Combined World Cup 1993/94 both results count.

Place	Name	Country	Total	20 (Austria)	26 (France)
1	Kjetil André Aamodt	Norway	180	80	100
	Lasse Kjus	Norway	180	100	80
3	Harald Strand Nilsen	Norway	105	45	60
4	Tommy Moe	United States	100	50	50
5	Günther Mader	Austria	82	60	22
6	Marcel Sulliger	Switzerland	72	40	32
7	Kristian Ghedina	Italy	52	32	20
8	Ed Podivinsky	Canada	45	-	45
9	Atle Skårdal	Norway	40	-	40
10	Janne Leskinen	Finland	36	36	-
	Steve Locher	Switzerland	36	-	36

== Ladies ==
=== Overall ===
see complete table

In Women's Overall World Cup 1993/94 all results count.

Place	Name	Country	Total	DH	SG	GS	SL	KB
1	Vreni Schneider	Switzerland	1656	112	88	516	860	80
2	Pernilla Wiberg	Sweden	1343	136	189	218	620	180
3	Katja Seizinger	Germany	1195	482	416	258	13	26
4	Anita Wachter	Austria	1057	0	157	635	215	50
5	Martina Ertl	Germany	943	92	129	360	312	50
6	Deborah Compagnoni	Italy	841	0	91	515	195	40
7	Ulrike Maier	Austria	711	22	160	432	52	45
8	Bibiana Perez	Italy	667	132	266	22	127	120
9	Marianne Kjørstad	Norway	570	0	57	218	279	16
10	Urška Hrovat	Slovenia	523	0	0	137	386	0
11	Morena Gallizio	Italy	505	6	64	64	286	85
12	Katja Koren	Slovenia	447	25	180	10	200	32
13	Alenka Dovžan	Slovenia	444	40	198	37	133	36
14	Kate Pace	Canada	398	398	0	0	0	0
15	Renate Götschl	Austria	378	106	15	59	98	100
	Špela Pretnar	Slovenia	378	42	38	141	109	48
17	Heidi Zeller	Switzerland	357	70	109	178	0	0
18	Hilde Gerg	Germany	344	16	200	53	40	35
19	Isolde Kostner	Italy	340	230	110	0	0	0
20	Carole Merle	France	303	8	52	243	0	0

=== Downhill ===
see complete table

In Women's Downhill World Cup 1993/94 all results count. Katja Seizinger won her third Downhill World Cup in a row. Tragically Austrian Ulrike Maier died after a bad crash in the race No. 23 at Garmisch-Partenkirchen.

Place	Name	Country	Total	5 (France)	9 (Austria)	16 (Italy)	23 (Germany)	24 (Spain)	28 (Canada)	31 (United States)
1	Katja Seizinger	Germany	482	80	32	100	20	50	100	100
2	Kate Pace	Canada	398	100	50	30	22	36	50	80
3	Mélanie Suchet	France	258	26	20	16	80	80	36	-
4	Isolde Kostner	Italy	230	24	-	14	100	30	-	32
5	Hilary Lindh	United States	214	2	12	50	-	100	32	18
6	Veronika Stallmaier	Austria	183	32	45	80	-	-	-	26
7	Varvara Zelenskaya	Russia	178	40	40	45	-	13	18	22
8	Picabo Street	United States	175	-	15	36	36	14	24	50
9	Michelle Ruthven	Canada	168	-	-	-	60	8	60	40
10	Anja Haas	Austria	153	13	100	40	-	-	-	-

=== Super G ===
see complete table

In Women's Super G World Cup 1993/94 all results count.

Place	Name	Country	Total	12 (Austria)	17 (Italy)	19 (Italy)	27 (Spain)	29 (United States)	32 (United States)
1	Katja Seizinger	Germany	416	60	100	50	26	100	80
2	Bibiana Perez	Italy	266	80	50	24	32	80	-
3	Hilde Gerg	Germany	200	-	40	-	100	60	-
4	Alenka Dovžan	Slovenia	198	45	-	100	5	24	24
5	Pernilla Wiberg	Sweden	189	40	45	100	-	4	-
6	Katja Koren	Slovenia	180	100	-	26	9	13	32
7	Ulrike Maier	Austria	160	20	80	60	-	-	-
8	Heidi Zurbriggen	Switzerland	159	-	29	22	45	18	45
9	Anita Wachter	Austria	157	-	40	45	-	12	60
10	Sylvia Eder	Austria	153	5	13	40	-	45	50
11	Kerrin Lee	Canada	147	7	60	-	-	40	40
12	Régine Cavagnoud	France	144	-	14	36	36	34	26
13	Diann Roffe	United States	141	3	4	6	12	16	100

=== Giant Slalom ===
see complete table

In Women's Giant Slalom World Cup 1993/94 all results count.

Place	Name	Country	Total	1 (Austria)	2 (Italy)	3 (Italy)	6 (France)	7 (Switzerland)	13 (France)	18 (Italy)	20 (Slovenia)	33 (United States)
1	Anita Wachter	Austria	635	100	100	80	80	-	80	100	45	50
2	Vreni Schneider	Switzerland	516	50	80	45	40	60	36	45	80	80
3	Deborah Compagnoni	Italy	515	-	45	50	100	100	100	80	40	-
4	Ulrike Maier	Austria	432	32	60	100	32	36	22	50	100	-
5	Martina Ertl	Germany	360	20	29	36	13	80	32	-	50	100
6	Katja Seizinger	Germany	258	40	-	10	-	45	26	32	60	45
7	Heidi Voelker	United States	251	-	12	15	45	29	60	36	32	32
8	Carole Merle	France	243	60	50	40	29	-	6	-	26	32
9	Eva Twardokens	United States	234	22	32	-	18	40	50	18	14	40
10	Christina Meier	Germany	219	16	22	29	24	24	24	24	36	20

=== Slalom ===
see complete table

In Women's Slalom World Cup 1993/94 all results count. Vreni Schneider won seven races and won her fifth Slalom World Cup, the last three of them in a row.

Place	Name	Country	Total	4 (Italy)	8 (Switzerland)	10 (Austria)	14 (France)	15 (Austria)	21 (Slovenia)	22 (Slovenia)	25 (Spain)	30 (United States)	34 (United States)
1	Vreni Schneider	Switzerland	860	100	-	100	80	100	80	100	100	100	100
2	Pernilla Wiberg	Sweden	620	50	100	80	100	80	-	80	80	50	-
3	Urška Hrovat	Slovenia	386	60	-	26	40	-	100	60	24	26	50
4	Martina Ertl	Germany	312	8	45	-	36	45	29	-	29	60	60
5	Morena Gallizio	Italy	286	29	80	40	-	12	40	40	45	-	-
6	Marianne Kjørstad	Norway	279	7	24	-	45	26	60	50	-	22	45
7	Christine von Grünigen	Switzerland	245	6	60	36	32	24	-	-	29	32	26
8	Patricia Chauvet	France	234	40	-	7	60	50	13	20	-	12	32
9	Anita Wachter	Austria	215	80	32	22	22	8	-	14	-	15	22
10	Kristina Andersson	Sweden	208	16	40	60	-	29	-	26	8	29	-

=== Combined ===
see complete table

In Women's Combined World Cup 1992/93 both results count.

Place	Name	Country	Total	11 (Austria)	26 (Spain)
1	Pernilla Wiberg	Sweden	180	80	100
2	Bibiana Perez	Italy	120	60	60
3	Renate Götschl	Austria	100	100	-
4	Morena Gallizio	Italy	85	40	45
5	Vreni Schneider	Switzerland	80	-	80
6	Erika Hansson	Sweden	51	22	29
7	Anita Wachter	Austria	50	50	-
8	Martina Ertl	Germany	50	-	50
9	Špela Pretnar	Slovenia	48	24	24
10	Leïla Piccard	France	46	20	26

== Nations Cup ==
=== Overall ===
Place	Country	Total	Men	Ladies
1	Austria	8780	5251	3529
2	Switzerland	6273	3101	3172
3	Italy	6038	2924	3114
4	Norway	5438	4335	1103
5	Germany	5066	1267	3799
6	France	3729	1633	2096
7	United States	2767	1089	1678
8	Slovenia	2719	891	1828
9	Sweden	2641	904	1737
10	Canada	2328	1444	884
11	Luxembourg	1007	1007	0
12	Russia	405	0	405
13	Liechtenstein	340	340	0
14	Japan	200	108	92
15	New Zealand	163	0	163
16	Finland	72	72	0
17	United Kingdom	46	46	0
18	Slovakia	40	0	40
19	Spain	26	0	26
20	Czech Republic	12	0	12
21	Kazakhstan	4	0	4

=== Men ===
Athletes from 11 different teams were able to win competitions.

Place	Country	Total	DH	SG	GS	SL	KB	Racers	Wins
1	Austria	5251	1398	947	720	1527	82	22	10
2	Norway	4335	958	947	963	933	534	12	9
3	Switzerland	3101	1269	364	914	446	108	16	3
4	Italy	2924	862	302	902	806	52	27	4
5	France	1633	754	176	504	199	0	16	1
6	Canada	1444	1152	82	50	60	100	12	2
7	Germany	1267	124	164	451	505	24	12	0
8	United States	1089	520	367	23	61	118	10	1
9	Luxembourg	1007	556	275	122	54	0	1	1
10	Sweden	904	12	56	446	390	0	7	2
11	Slovenia	891	0	8	281	602	0	5	1
12	Liechtenstein	340	205	0	135	0	0	3	1
13	Japan	108	0	0	0	108	0	2	0
14	Finland	72	0	36	0	0	36	1	0
15	United Kingdom	46	46	0	0	0	0	2	0

=== Ladies ===
Place	Country	Total	DH	SG	GS	SL	KB	Racers	Wins
1	Germany	3799	961	1081	1050	536	171	14	7
2	Austria	3529	653	615	1295	739	227	22	7
3	Switzerland	3172	331	365	888	1490	98	15	7
4	Italy	3114	475	569	831	985	254	12	4
5	France	2096	549	309	591	549	98	12	0
6	Slovenia	1828	107	416	325	864	116	5	3
7	Sweden	1737	137	189	304	876	231	5	4
8	United States	1678	509	295	537	290	47	13	2
9	Norway	1103	154	103	438	392	16	10	0
10	Canada	884	679	169	36	0	10	5	1
11	Russia	405	289	94	0	0	22	4	0
12	New Zealand	163	0	0	0	163	0	1	0
13	Japan	92	82	0	0	0	10	1	0
14	Slovakia	40	0	6	0	14	20	2	0
15	Spain	26	0	10	16	0	0	1	0
16	Czech Republic	12	0	0	0	12	0	1	0
17	Kazakhstan	4	4	0	0	0	0	1	0
