= Xavier Ubeira =

Spanish Olympic alpine skier (born 1970)

Xavier Ubeira (born 3 May 1970) is a Spanish former alpine skier who competed in the 1992 Winter Olympics and in the 1994 Winter Olympics.
