= 1992–93 FIS Alpine Ski World Cup =

International sports competition

FIS Alpine Ski World Cup 1992/93
Discipline	Men	Women
Overall	(Luxembourg) Marc Girardelli	(Austria) Anita Wachter
Downhill	(Switzerland) Franz Heinzer	(Germany) Katja Seizinger
Super G	(Norway) Kjetil André Aamodt	(Germany) Katja Seizinger
Giant Slalom	(Norway) Kjetil André Aamodt	(France) Carole Merle
Slalom	(Sweden) Thomas Fogdö	(Switzerland) Vreni Schneider
Nations Cup	Austria	Austria
- Nations Cup overall: Austria

Competition
Locations	17	12
Individual	34	32

The 27th World Cup season began in November 1992 in Sestriere, Italy for men and Park City, Utah, USA for women, and concluded in March 1993 at the newly created World Cup Final in Åre, Sweden. A break in the schedule was for the 1993 World Championships, held in Morioka, Japan, from February 4–14.

Marc Girardelli of Luxembourg won his fifth overall title, which was the most for a man in World Cup history until surpassed by Austrian Marcel Hirscher in 2017. Anita Wachter of Austria won the women's overall title, her first. Both winners won narrow victories because of their superior performance in the combined (Girardelli won all three for men en route to a 32-point victory over Kjetil André Aamodt; Wachter won one of the two for women (and was fourth in the other) en route to a 20-point victory over Katja Seizinger). In December, defending women's World Cup champion Petra Kronberger of Austria abruptly retired, saying that she had lost her motivation to continue.

Lack of snow in Europe during the winter caused the schedule to be significantly rearranged. All of the races at the classic sites of Wengen and Kitzbühel were cancelled. Snowmaking was installed at Kitzbühel that summer as a result. Also, Czechoslovakia peacefully dissolved into two countries—the Czech Republic and Slovakia—effective as of January 1, 1993, although the ski team remained unified until the end of the season.

At the end of the season in March, the International Ski Federation (FIS) added a World Cup Final, which immediately became a permanent part of the World Cup agenda. During this final, weather permitting, men's and women's races are held in each of the four disciplines: slalom, giant slalom, Super G, and downhill, as well as a team parallel slalom competition. Only a limited number of racers are invited to ski at the Finals, including the top 25 in the World Cup standings in each discipline, plus the current junior World Champions in each discipline, plus competitors for the overall title who failed to qualify on points within the discipline (if any). Because of the smaller field, World Cup points are only awarded to the top 15 finishers in each race.

== Calendar ==
=== Men ===
Event Key: DH – Downhill, SL – Slalom, GS – Giant Slalom, SG – Super Giant Slalom, KB – Combined
Race	Season	Date	Place	Type	Winner	Second	Third
760	1	28 November 1992	(Italy) Sestriere	GS _{199}	(Norway) Kjetil André Aamodt	(Italy) Alberto Tomba	(Sweden) Johan Wallner
761	2	29 November 1992	(Italy) Sestriere	SL _{231}	(Italy) Fabrizio Tescari	(Austria) Michael Tritscher	(Germany) Armin Bittner (Austria) Hubert Strolz
762	3	5 December 1992	(France) Val d'Isère	SG _{046}	(Norway) Jan Einar Thorsen	(Switzerland) Franz Heinzer	(Italy) Luigi Colturi
763	4	6 December 1992	(France) Val d'Isère	SL _{232}	(Sweden) Thomas Fogdö	(Austria) Thomas Sykora	(Austria) Hubert Strolz
764	5	11 December 1992	(Italy) Val Gardena	DH _{224}	(Switzerland) William Besse	(Norway) Jan Einar Thorsen	(Austria) Patrick Ortlieb
765	6	12 December 1992	(Italy) Val Gardena	DH _{225}	(Austria) Leonhard Stock	(Switzerland) William Besse	(United States) A. J. Kitt
766	7	13 December 1992	(Italy) Alta Badia	GS _{200}	(Luxembourg) Marc Girardelli	(France) Alain Feutrier	(Italy) Alberto Tomba
767	8	15 December 1992	(Italy) Madonna di Campiglio	SL _{233}	(France) Patrice Bianchi	(Italy) Alberto Tomba	(Austria) Thomas Sykora
768	9	19 December 1992	(Slovenia) Kranjska Gora	SL _{234}	(Sweden) Thomas Fogdö	(Italy) Alberto Tomba	(Germany) Peter Roth
769	10	20 December 1992	(Slovenia) Kranjska Gora	GS _{201}	(Luxembourg) Marc Girardelli	(Norway) Lasse Kjus	(Sweden) Fredrik Nyberg
770	11	22 December 1992	(Austria) Bad Kleinkirchheim	SG _{047}	(Austria) Armin Assinger	(Austria) Leonhard Stock	(Norway) Kjetil André Aamodt
771	12	9 January 1993	(Germany) Garmisch-Partenkirchen	SL _{235}	(Italy) Alberto Tomba	(Norway) Kjetil André Aamodt (Austria) Thomas Stangassinger	
772	13	10 January 1993	(Germany) Garmisch-Partenkirchen	DH _{226}	(Switzerland) Franz Heinzer	(Italy) Pietro Vitalini	(Austria) Günther Mader
773	14	10 January 1993	(Germany) Garmisch-Partenkirchen	KB _{063}	(Luxembourg) Marc Girardelli	(Norway) Kjetil André Aamodt	(Austria) Günther Mader
774	15	11 January 1993	(Germany) Garmisch-Partenkirchen	DH _{227}	(Switzerland) Daniel Mahrer	(Austria) Peter Rzehak	(Switzerland) Franz Heinzer
775	16	12 January 1993	(Austria) St. Anton	SG _{048}	(Luxembourg) Marc Girardelli	(Norway) Jan Einar Thorsen	(Austria) Günther Mader
776	17	16 January 1993	(Austria) St. Anton	DH _{228}	(Switzerland) Franz Heinzer	(Italy) Peter Runggaldier	(Austria) Günther Mader
777	18	17 January 1993	(Austria) Lech am Arlberg	SL _{236}	(Sweden) Thomas Fogdö	(Slovenia) Jure Košir	(Italy) Alberto Tomba
778	19	16 January 1993; 17 January 1993	(Austria) St. Anton (DH) (Austria) Lech am Arlberg (SL)	KB _{064}	(Luxembourg) Marc Girardelli	(Austria) Günther Mader	(Austria) Hubert Strolz
779	20	19 January 1993	(Switzerland) Veysonnaz	GS _{202}	(Switzerland) Michael von Grünigen	(Italy) Alberto Tomba	(Norway) Lasse Kjus
780	21	23 January 1993	(Switzerland) Veysonnaz	DH _{229}	(Switzerland) Franz Heinzer	(Austria) Patrick Ortlieb	(Switzerland) William Besse
781	22	24 January 1993	(Switzerland) Veysonnaz	SL _{237}	(Austria) Thomas Stangassinger	(Italy) Alberto Tomba	(Sweden) Thomas Fogdö
782	23	24 January 1993	(Switzerland) Veysonnaz	KB _{065}	(Luxembourg) Marc Girardelli	(Norway) Kjetil André Aamodt	(Austria) Günther Mader
1993 World Championships (4–14 February)
783	24	27 February 1993	(Canada) Whistler	DH _{230}	(Norway) Atle Skårdal	(United States) Tommy Moe	(Switzerland) Franz Heinzer
784	25	28 February 1993	(Canada) Whistler	SG _{049}	(Austria) Günther Mader	(Switzerland) Franz Heinzer	(Austria) Patrick Ortlieb
785	26	7 March 1993	(United States) Aspen	SG _{050}	(Norway) Kjetil André Aamodt	(Austria) Stephan Eberharter	(Switzerland) Daniel Mahrer
786	27	15 March 1993	(Spain) Sierra Nevada	DH _{231}	(Austria) Armin Assinger	(Switzerland) Daniel Mahrer	(Austria) Hannes Trinkl
787	28	19 March 1993	(Norway) Lillehammer (Kvitfjell)	DH _{232}	(France) Adrien Duvillard	(Italy) Werner Perathoner	(Norway) Atle Skårdal
788	29	20 March 1993	(Norway) Lillehammer (Kvitfjell)	DH _{233}	(Austria) Armin Assinger	(Italy) Werner Perathoner	(Austria) Hannes Trinkl
789	30	21 March 1993	(Norway) Lillehammer (Kvitfjell)	SG _{051}	(Norway) Kjetil André Aamodt	(Switzerland) Daniel Mahrer	(Austria) Dietmar Thöni
790	31	23 March 1993	(Norway) Oppdal	GS _{203}	(Norway) Kjetil André Aamodt	(Sweden) Johan Wallner	(Sweden) Fredrik Nyberg
791	32	26 March 1993	(Sweden) Åre	SG _{052}	(Norway) Kjetil André Aamodt	(Austria) Günther Mader	(Switzerland) Franz Heinzer
792	33	27 March 1993	(Sweden) Åre	GS _{204}	(Norway) Kjetil André Aamodt	(Italy) Alberto Tomba	(Luxembourg) Marc Girardelli
793	34	28 March 1993	(Sweden) Åre	SL _{238}	(Sweden) Thomas Fogdö	(Norway) Kjetil André Aamodt	(Austria) Thomas Stangassinger

=== Ladies ===
Event Key: DH – Downhill, SL – Slalom, GS – Giant Slalom, SG – Super Giant Slalom, KB – Combined
Race	Season	Date	Place	Type	Winner	Second	Third
704	1	28 November 1992	(United States) Park City	GS _{194}	(Austria) Ulrike Maier	(France) Carole Merle	(Switzerland) Vreni Schneider
705	2	29 November 1992	(United States) Park City	SL _{223}	(United States) Julie Parisien	(Sweden) Pernilla Wiberg	(New Zealand) Annelise Coberger
706	3	5 December 1992	(United States) Steamboat Springs	GS _{195}	(Austria) Anita Wachter	(Italy) Sabina Panzanini	(Italy) Deborah Compagnoni
707	4	6 December 1992	(United States) Steamboat Springs	SL _{224}	(Sweden) Pernilla Wiberg	(New Zealand) Annelise Coberger	(Austria) Petra Kronberger
708	5	12 December 1992	(United States) Vail	DH _{189}	(Germany) Miriam Vogt	(Germany) Katharina Gutensohn	(Canada) Kerrin Lee-Gartner
709	6	13 December 1992	(United States) Vail	SG _{044}	(Austria) Ulrike Maier	(Norway) Astrid Lødemel	(Austria) Anita Wachter
710	7	19 December 1992	(Canada) Lake Louise	DH _{190}	(Switzerland) Chantal Bournissen	(Germany) Katja Seizinger	(Germany) Michaela Gerg-Leitner
711	8	20 December 1992	(Canada) Lake Louise	SG _{045}	(Germany) Katja Seizinger	(Russia) Tetiana Lebedeva	(Germany) Regina Häusl
712	9	5 January 1993	(Slovenia) Maribor	GS _{196}	(France) Carole Merle	(Austria) Anita Wachter	(Switzerland) Vreni Schneider
713	10	6 January 1993	(Slovenia) Maribor	SL _{225}	(Switzerland) Vreni Schneider	(New Zealand) Annelise Coberger	(Italy) Deborah Compagnoni
714	11	9 January 1993	(Italy) Cortina d'Ampezzo	DH _{191}	(Germany) Regina Häusl	(Switzerland) Heidi Zurbriggen	(Germany) Katja Seizinger
715	12	10 January 1993	(Italy) Cortina d'Ampezzo	GS _{197}	(France) Carole Merle	(Austria) Anita Wachter	(Italy) Deborah Compagnoni
716	13	15 January 1993	(Italy) Cortina d'Ampezzo	DH _{192}	(Germany) Katja Seizinger	(France) Carole Merle	(Austria) Barbara Sadleder
717	14	16 January 1993	(Italy) Cortina d'Ampezzo	SG _{046}	(Austria) Ulrike Maier	(France) Carole Merle	(Austria) Sylvia Eder
718	15	17 January 1993	(Italy) Cortina d'Ampezzo	SL _{226}	(Switzerland) Vreni Schneider	(New Zealand) Annelise Coberger	(Austria) Karin Buder
719	16	17 January 1993	(Italy) Cortina d'Ampezzo	KB _{057}	(Austria) Anita Wachter	(Germany) Miriam Vogt	(Austria) Sabine Ginther
720	17	22 January 1993	(Austria) Haus im Ennstal	DH _{193}	(Switzerland) Chantal Bournissen	(Russia) Varvara Zelenskaya	(Austria) Sabine Ginther
721	18	24 January 1993	(Austria) Haus im Ennstal	SL _{227}	(France) Patricia Chauvet	(Austria) Anita Wachter	(Italy) Morena Gallizio
1993 World Championships (4–14 February)
722	19	26 February 1993	(Switzerland) Veysonnaz	DH _{194}	(Germany) Katja Seizinger	(Canada) Kerrin Lee-Gartner	(Germany) Miriam Vogt
723	20	27 February 1993	(Switzerland) Veysonnaz	DH _{195}	(Austria) Anja Haas	(France) Régine Cavagnoud	(Switzerland) Heidi Zurbriggen (Canada) Kate Pace
724	21	28 February 1993	(Switzerland) Veysonnaz	SG _{047}	(France) Carole Merle	(Austria) Anita Wachter	(France) Régine Cavagnoud
725	22	3 March 1993	(France) Morzine	DH _{196}	(Germany) Katja Seizinger	(Germany) Regina Häusl	(Norway) Astrid Lødemel
726	23	7 March 1993	(France) Morzine	SG _{048}	(Italy) Deborah Compagnoni	(Germany) Katja Seizinger	(Austria) Anita Wachter
727	24	13 March 1993	(Norway) Lillehammer (Kvitfjell)	DH _{197}	(Canada) Kate Pace	(United States) Picabo Street	(France) Carole Montillet
728	25	14 March 1993	(Norway) Lillehammer (Hafjell)	SL _{228}	(Austria) Renate Götschl	(Sweden) Kristina Andersson	(France) Patricia Chauvet
729	26	14 March 1993	(Norway) Lillehammer (Hafjell)	KB _{058}	(Italy) Bibiana Perez	(Italy) Morena Gallizio	(Germany) Miriam Vogt
730	27	15 March 1993	(Norway) Lillehammer (Hafjell)	GS _{198}	(Germany) Christina Meier-Höck	(Germany) Martina Ertl	(Germany) Katja Seizinger
731	28	19 March 1993	(Sweden) Vemdalen	SL _{229}	(Switzerland) Vreni Schneider	(France) Patricia Chauvet	(New Zealand) Annelise Coberger
732	29	20 March 1993	(Sweden) Vemdalen	GS _{199}	(Germany) Katja Seizinger	(Switzerland) Heidi Zeller-Bähler	(France) Carole Merle
733	30	26 March 1993	(Sweden) Åre	SG _{049}	(Germany) Katja Seizinger	(Austria) Ulrike Maier	(Italy) Deborah Compagnoni
734	31	27 March 1993	(Sweden) Åre	GS _{200}	(France) Carole Merle	(Italy) Deborah Compagnoni	(Austria) Anita Wachter
735	32	28 March 1993	(Sweden) Åre	SL _{230}	(Switzerland) Vreni Schneider	(Austria) Karin Köllerer	(Austria) Christina Riegel

== Men ==
=== Overall ===
see complete table

In 1993, all the results count toward the overall title. Marc Girardelli won his fifth overall title.

Place	Name	Country	Total	DH	SG	GS	SL	KB
1	Marc Girardelli	Luxembourg	1379	331	216	372	160	300
2	Kjetil André Aamodt	Norway	1347	90	420	410	267	160
3	Franz Heinzer	Switzerland	828	527	301	0	0	0
4	Günther Mader	Austria	826	192	307	26	101	200
5	Alberto Tomba	Italy	817	0	0	381	436	0
6	Atle Skårdal	Norway	596	427	169	0	0	0
7	Patrick Ortlieb	Austria	560	272	198	0	0	90
8	Daniel Mahrer	Switzerland	556	343	213	0	0	0
9	Thomas Fogdö	Sweden	545	0	0	0	545	0
10	Armin Assinger	Austria	533	360	13	0	0	0
11	Jan Einar Thorsen	Norway	460	164	294	2	0	0
12	Lasse Kjus	Norway	452	0	32	254	96	70
13	William Besse	Switzerland	442	366	44	0	0	32
14	Markus Wasmeier	Germany	400	171	135	21	18	55
15	Steve Locher	Switzerland	370	12	68	124	35	131
16	Adrien Duvillard	France	364	206	69	7	0	82
17	Thomas Stangassinger	Austria	362	0	0	0	362	0
18	Paul Accola	Switzerland	334	4	83	168	79	0
19	Fredrik Nyberg	Sweden	319	0	69	250	0	0
20	Michael von Grünigen	Switzerland	313	0	0	236	77	0

=== Downhill ===
see complete table

In 1993, all results were used to determine the title. Franz Heinzer won his third Downhill title in a row.

Place	Name	Country	Total	5 (Italy)	6 (Italy)	13 (Germany)	15 (Germany)	17 (Austria)	21 (Switzerland)	24 (Canada)	27 (Spain)	28 (Norway)	29 (Norway)
1	Franz Heinzer	Switzerland	527	40	24	100	60	100	100	60	10	7	26
2	Atle Skårdal	Norway	427	36	40	15	29	50	50	100	18	60	29
3	William Besse	Switzerland	366	100	80	26	10	24	60	7	-	9	50
4	Armin Assinger	Austria	360	20	7	10	32	22	-	29	100	40	100
5	Daniel Mahrer	Switzerland	343	15	29	6	100	36	26	14	80	15	22
6	Marc Girardelli	Luxembourg	331	29	50	45	45	40	22	36	16	3	45
7	Patrick Ortlieb	Austria	272	60	26	-	-	45	80	32	-	5	24
8	Hannes Trinkl	Austria	264	26	12	50	20	-	36	-	60	-	60
9	Werner Perathoner	Italy	256	8	14	2	8	26	16	9	13	80	80
10	Peter Rzehak	Austria	255	6	-	18	80	15	32	40	-	50	14

=== Super G ===
see complete table

In Men's Super G World Cup 1992/93 all results count.

Place	Name	Country	Total	3 (France)	11 (Austria)	16 (Austria)	25 (Canada)	26 (United States)	30 (Norway)	32 (Sweden)
1	Kjetil André Aamodt	Norway	420	-	60	24	36	100	100	100
2	Günther Mader	Austria	307	29	6	60	100	-	32	80
3	Franz Heinzer	Switzerland	301	80	14	18	80	36	13	60
4	Jan Einar Thorsen	Norway	294	100	50	80	26	10	4	24
5	Marc Girardelli	Luxembourg	216	-	20	100	40	40	-	16
6	Daniel Mahrer	Switzerland	213	12	-	10	29	30	80	22
7	Patrick Ortlieb	Austria	198	45	-	16	60	-	32	45
8	Luigi Colturi	Italy	181	60	-	40	4	-	45	32
9	Martin Hangl	Switzerland	176	-	45	45	14	22	-	50
10	Armin Assinger	Austria	173	18	100	11	-	3	15	26

=== Giant Slalom ===
see complete table

In 1993 all results counted toward the title.

Place	Name	Country	Total	1 (Italy)	7 (Italy)	10 (Slovenia)	20 (Switzerland)	31 (Norway)	33 (Sweden)
1	Kjetil André Aamodt	Norway	410	100	20	50	40	100	100
2	Alberto Tomba	Italy	381	80	60	36	80	45	80
3	Marc Girardelli	Luxembourg	372	12	100	100	50	50	60
4	Lasse Kjus	Norway	254	40	9	80	60	20	45
5	Fredrik Nyberg	Sweden	250	22	40	60	18	60	50
6	Michael von Grünigen	Switzerland	236	11	45	26	100	22	32
7	Johan Wallner	Sweden	208	60	26	18	24	80	-
8	Paul Accola	Switzerland	168	36	50	13	-	40	29
9	Alain Feutrier	France	148	-	80	-	-	32	36
10	Hans Pieren	Switzerland	143	24	32	20	45	-	22

=== Slalom ===
see complete table

In 1993 all results counted towards the title.

Place	Name	Country	Total	2 (Italy)	4 (France)	8 (Italy)	9 (Slovenia)	12 (Germany)	18 (Austria)	22 (Switzerland)	34 (Sweden)
1	Thomas Fogdö	Sweden	545	-	100	40	100	45	100	60	100
2	Alberto Tomba	Italy	436	-	36	80	80	100	60	80	-
3	Thomas Stangassinger	Austria	362	24	-	24	24	80	50	100	60
4	Bernhard Gstrein	Austria	276	22	26	32	16	40	50	40	50
5	Kjetil André Aamodt	Norway	267	-	11	-	15	80	36	45	80
6	Jure Košir	Slovenia	251	12	16	29	32	32	80	50	-
7	Thomas Sykora	Austria	238	29	80	60	-	29	-	-	40
8	Peter Roth	Germany	202	-	-	16	60	50	40	36	-
9	Patrick Staub	Switzerland	196	-	24	50	45	18	10	20	29
10	Armin Bittner	Germany	185	60	50	-	-	24	-	15	36
11	Oliver Künzi	Switzerland	179	15	45	45	-	8	24	18	24
12	Hubert Strolz	Austria	172	60	60	-	-	20	32	-	-
13	Marc Girardelli	Luxembourg	160	45	-	11	20	36	22	26	-
14	Michael Tritscher	Austria	149	80	-	-	40	-	-	29	-
15	Patrice Bianchi	France	140	40	-	100	-	-	-	-	-
16	Fabrizio Tescari	Italy	113	100	6	-	-	7	-	-	-

=== Combined ===
see complete table

In 1993, all three results count. Marc Girardelli won his third Combined World Cup by winning all three competitions.

Place	Name	Country	Total	14 (Germany)	19 (Austria)	23 (Switzerland)
1	Marc Girardelli	Luxembourg	300	100	100	100
2	Günther Mader	Austria	200	60	80	60
3	Kjetil André Aamodt	Norway	160	80	-	80
4	Steve Locher	Switzerland	131	36	45	50
5	Hubert Strolz	Austria	105	45	60	-
6	Patrick Ortlieb	Austria	90	18	40	32
7	Adrien Duvillard	France	82	32	50	-
	Rainer Salzgeber	Austria	82	26	20	36
9	Lasse Kjus	Norway	70	50	-	20
10	Stephan Eberharter	Austria	69	29	-	40

== Ladies ==
=== Overall ===
see complete table

In 1993 all results count.

Place	Name	Country	Total	DH	SG	GS	SL	KB
1	Anita Wachter	Austria	1286	155	313	396	272	150
2	Katja Seizinger	Germany	1266	604	371	234	7	50
3	Carole Merle	France	1086	280	326	480	0	0
4	Miriam Vogt	Germany	699	283	77	42	157	140
5	Ulrike Maier	Austria	696	14	356	252	45	29
6	Vreni Schneider	Switzerland	626	0	0	136	490	0
7	Martina Ertl	Germany	605	100	99	278	38	90
8	Heidi Zeller-Bähler	Switzerland	599	202	130	245	0	22
9	Kerrin Lee-Gartner	Canada	565	294	199	50	0	22
10	Regina Häusl	Germany	553	323	181	29	0	20
11	Deborah Compagnoni	Italy	535	0	230	200	105	0
12	Morena Gallizio	Italy	525	20	10	119	256	120
13	Régine Cavagnoud	France	497	271	158	26	0	42
14	Annelise Coberger	New Zealand	484	0	0	0	484	0
15	Heidi Zurbriggen	Switzerland	469	255	159	55	0	0
16	Sylvia Eder	Austria	421	0	263	158	0	0
17	Patricia Chauvet	France	402	0	0	0	402	0
18	Chantal Bournissen	Switzerland	362	258	60	0	8	36
19	Astrid Lødemel	Norway	359	196	131	32	0	0
20	Kristina Andersson	Sweden	358	0	0	97	261	0

=== Downhill ===
see complete table

In 1993 all results count.

Place	Name	Country	Total	5 (United States)	7 (Canada)	11 (Italy)	13 (Italy)	17 (Austria)	19 (Switzerland)	20 (Switzerland)	22 (France)	24 (Norway)
1	Katja Seizinger	Germany	604	50	80	60	100	50	100	40	100	24
2	Regina Häusl	Germany	323	36	-	100	50	4	16	11	80	26
3	Kerrin Lee-Gartner	Canada	294	60	18	40	29	32	80	-	20	15
4	Anja Haas	Austria	291	45	1	14	24	26	45	100	18	18
5	Kate Pace	Canada	285	-	45	26	22	-	20	60	12	100
6	Miriam Vogt	Germany	283	100	15	12	15	29	60	24	24	4
7	Carole Merle	France	280	13	6	50	80	26	40	15	50	-
8	Régine Cavagnoud	France	271	14	7	29	36	18	50	80	32	5
9	Chantal Bournissen	Switzerland	258	18	100	-	40	100	-	-	-	-
10	Heidi Zurbriggen	Switzerland	255	26	40	80	5	13	20	60	11	-

=== Super G ===
see complete table

In 1993 all results count.

Place	Name	Country	Total	6 (United States)	8 (Canada)	14 (Italy)	21 (Switzerland)	23 (France)	30 (Sweden)
1	Katja Seizinger	Germany	371	26	100	36	29	80	100
2	Ulrike Maier	Austria	356	100	11	100	36	29	80
3	Carole Merle	France	326	45	29	80	100	32	40
4	Anita Wachter	Austria	313	60	32	45	80	60	36
5	Sylvia Eder	Austria	263	50	50	60	29	45	29
6	Deborah Compagnoni	Italy	230	-	-	20	50	100	60
7	Kerrin Lee-Gartner	Canada	199	36	40	15	40	50	18
8	Regina Häusl	Germany	181	12	60	8	32	24	45
9	Heidi Zurbriggen	Switzerland	159	-	22	32	45	36	24
10	Régine Cavagnoud	France	158	7	15	26	60	-	50

=== Giant Slalom ===
see complete table

In 1993 all results count.

Place	Name	Country	Total	1 (United States)	3 (United States)	9 (Slovenia)	12 (Italy)	27 (Norway)	29 (Sweden)	31 (Sweden)
1	Carole Merle	France	480	80	-	100	100	40	60	100
2	Anita Wachter	Austria	396	45	100	80	80	20	11	60
3	Martina Ertl	Germany	278	10	40	50	32	80	40	26
4	Ulrike Maier	Austria	252	100	32	20	-	45	26	29
5	Heidi Zeller-Bähler	Switzerland	245	36	-	12	40	32	80	45
6	Sabina Panzanini	Italy	238	-	80	45	-	36	45	32
7	Katja Seizinger	Germany	234	-	-	-	24	60	100	50
8	Deborah Compagnoni	Italy	200	-	60	-	60	-	-	80
9	Christina Meier-Höck	Germany	199	-	22	29	26	100	22	-
10	Anne Berge	Norway	162	16	18	-	18	50	24	36

=== Slalom ===
see complete table

In 1993 all results count. Vreni Schneider won her fourth Slalom World Cup.

Place	Name	Country	Total	2 (United States)	4 (United States)	10 (Slovenia)	15 (Italy)	18 (Austria)	25 (Norway)	28 (Sweden)	32 (Sweden)
1	Vreni Schneider	Switzerland	490	50	-	100	100	-	40	100	100
2	Annelise Coberger	New Zealand	484	60	80	80	80	29	45	60	50
3	Patricia Chauvet	France	402	18	40	36	32	100	60	80	36
4	Anita Wachter	Austria	272	-	50	24	36	80	13	45	24
5	Kristina Andersson	Sweden	261	45	-	50	-	26	80	20	40
6	Morena Gallizio	Italy	256	29	-	32	24	60	50	32	29
7	Julie Parisien	United States	230	100	-	50	-	40	-	40	-
8	Elfi Eder	Austria	207	22	-	29	40	45	15	24	32
9	Karin Köllerer	Austria	194	26	-	5	7	-	36	40	80
10	Ingrid Salvenmoser	Austria	185	20	26	40	45	32	-	22	-
11	Pernilla Wiberg	Sweden	180	80	100	-	-	-	-	-	-
12	Karin Buder	Austria	177	45	22	-	60	50	-	-	-
13	Miriam Vogt	Germany	157	-	29	18	22	20	26	26	16
14	Urška Hrovat	Slovenia	132	-	-	-	29	24	29	50	-
15	Christine von Grünigen	Switzerland	111	8	18	22	-	36	16	11	-
16	Martina Accola	Switzerland	109	10	36	7	20	-	20	16	-
17	Deborah Compagnoni	Italy	105	-	-	60	-	-	-	-	45
18	Renate Götschl	Austria	100	-	-	-	-	-	100	-	-

=== Combined ===
see complete table

In 1993 both results count.

Place	Name	Country	Total	16 (Italy)	26 (Norway)
1	Anita Wachter	Austria	150	100	50
2	Miriam Vogt	Germany	140	80	60
3	Morena Gallizio	Italy	120	40	80
4	Bibiana Perez	Italy	100	-	100
5	Martina Ertl	Germany	90	45	45
6	Sabine Ginther	Austria	60	60	-
7	Katja Seizinger	Germany	50	50	-
8	Régine Cavagnoud	France	42	13	29
9	Stefanie Schuster	Austria	40	-	40
10	Chantal Bournissen	Switzerland	36	36	-
	Anja Haas	Austria	36	-	36

== Nations Cup ==
=== Overall ===
Place	Country	Total	Men	Ladies
1	Austria	10686	5398	5288
2	Switzerland	6907	4272	2635
3	Germany	5512	1159	4353
4	Italy	5208	3125	2083
5	Norway	4714	3695	1019
6	France	4002	1728	2274
7	Sweden	2237	1494	743
8	United States	1914	617	1297
9	Canada	1456	464	992
10	Luxembourg	1379	1379	0
11	Slovenia	795	370	425
12	Russia	651	0	651
13	New Zealand	484	0	484
14	Czechoslovakia/ Czech Republic and Slovakia	92	0	92
15	Japan	45	34	11
16	Finland	23	23	0
17	Poland	19	19	0
18	Hungary	11	11	0
19	Liechtenstein	4	4	0
20	United Kingdom	2	2	0

=== Men ===
Place	Country	Total	DH	SG	GS	SL	KB	Racers	Wins
1	Austria	5398	1811	1130	374	1475	608	24	6
2	Switzerland	4272	1722	982	769	578	221	17	6
3	Norway	3695	770	1159	817	621	328	12	8
4	Italy	3125	958	472	741	834	120	28	2
5	France	1728	697	352	371	188	120	21	2
6	Sweden	1494	10	254	458	756	16	8	4
7	Luxembourg	1379	331	216	372	160	300	1	6
8	Germany	1159	240	191	171	478	79	9	0
9	United States	617	350	114	29	42	82	9	0
10	Canada	464	331	46	13	35	39	7	0
11	Slovenia	370	0	0	68	302	0	4	0
12	Japan	34	0	0	0	34	0	2	0
13	Finland	23	0	16	0	7	0	2	0
14	Poland	19	0	0	0	0	19	2	0
15	Hungary	11	0	0	0	0	11	1	0
16	Liechtenstein	4	0	0	4	0	0	1	0
17	United Kingdom	2	2	0	0	0	0	1	0

=== Ladies ===
Place	Country	Total	DH	SG	GS	SL	KB	Racers	Wins
1	Austria	5288	1229	1227	937	1556	339	24	7
2	Germany	4353	1911	899	906	305	332	16	9
3	Switzerland	2635	739	357	606	844	89	15	6
4	France	2274	664	518	587	463	42	12	5
5	Italy	2083	111	333	834	569	236	11	2
6	United States	1297	434	231	195	423	14	15	1
7	Norway	1019	258	139	460	138	24	8	0
8	Canada	992	664	212	50	0	66	5	1
9	Sweden	743	17	32	187	492	15	4	1
10	Russia	651	440	201	0	0	10	5	0
11	New Zealand	484	0	0	0	484	0	1	0
12	Slovenia	425	26	49	93	231	26	5	0
13	Czechoslovakia/ Czech Republic and Slovakia	92	0	10	0	38	44	2	0
14	Japan	11	11	0	0	0	0	1	0
