= 1995 Alpine Skiing World Cup – Men's super-G =

1995 Men's super-G World Cup
| Previous: 1994 | Next: 1996 |

Men's super-G World Cup 1994/1995

== Calendar ==
| Round | Race No | Place | Country | Date | Winner | Second | Third |
|---|---|---|---|---|---|---|---|
| 1 | 3 | Tignes | France | December 11, 1994 | (Austria) Patrick Ortlieb | (United States) Tommy Moe | (France) Luc Alphand |
| 2 | 17 | Kitzbühel | Austria | January 16, 1995 | (Austria) Günther Mader | (Italy) Peter Runggaldier | (Austria) Armin Assinger |
| 3 | 26 | Whistler Mountain | Canada | February 26, 1995 | (Italy) Peter Runggaldier | (United States) A. J. Kitt | (Austria) Christian Greber |
| 4 | 27 | Kvitfjell | Norway | March 10, 1995 | (Italy) Werner Perathoner | (Italy) Kristian Ghedina | (United States) Kyle Rasmussen |
| 5 | 30 | Bormio | Italy | March 16, 1995 | (Austria) Richard Kröll | (Italy) Peter Runggaldier | (Italy) Werner Perathoner |

== Final point standings ==
In men's super-G World Cup 1994/95 all results count.

| Place | Name | Country | Total points | 3 (France) | 17 (Austria) | 26 (Canada) | 27 (Norway) | 30 (Italy) |
|---|---|---|---|---|---|---|---|---|
| 1 | Peter Runggaldier | Italy | 332 | 36 | 80 | 100 | 26 | 80 |
| 2 | Günther Mader | Austria | 250 | 24 | 100 | 45 | 45 | 36 |
| 3 | Werner Perathoner | Italy | 237 | 32 | 45 | - | 100 | 60 |
| 4 | Richard Kröll | Austria | 170 | 12 | 40 | - | 18 | 100 |
| 5 | Kyle Rasmussen | United States | 148 | 29 | 3 | 6 | 60 | 50 |
| | Atle Skårdal | Norway | 142 | 50 | 14 | 16 | 22 | 40 |
| 7 | Kristian Ghedina | Italy | 126 | 14 | 4 | 12 | 80 | 16 |
| 8 | Armin Assinger | Austria | 123 | 24 | 60 | 10 | 29 | - |
| 9 | Patrick Ortlieb | Austria | 122 | 100 | - | 7 | 15 | - |
| 10 | Marc Girardelli | Luxembourg | 111 | - | 26 | 32 | 24 | 29 |
| 11 | Tommy Moe | United States | 109 | 80 | 29 | - | - | - |
| 12 | Daniel Mahrer | Switzerland | 100 | 40 | - | 22 | 12 | 26 |
| 13 | Pietro Vitalini | Italy | 97 | 10 | 15 | 40 | 32 | - |
| 14 | Luc Alphand | France | 96 | 60 | 16 | 20 | - | - |
| | Alessandro Fattori | Italy | 96 | 20 | 36 | - | 40 | - |
| | Fredrik Nyberg | Sweden | 96 | - | 50 | 26 | - | 20 |
| 17 | A. J. Kitt | United States | 89 | 5 | - | 80 | 4 | - |
| 18 | Daron Rahlves | United States | 82 | - | - | 8 | 50 | 24 |
| 19 | Kjetil André Aamodt | Norway | 79 | 8 | 6 | 24 | 9 | 32 |
| 20 | Christian Greber | Austria | 78 | - | - | 60 | - | 18 |
| 21 | Luigi Colturi | Italy | 71 | 45 | 26 | - | - | - |
| | Patrick Wirth | Austria | 71 | - | - | - | 26 | 45 |
| 23 | Ed Podivinsky | Canada | 56 | - | - | 50 | 6 | - |
| 24 | Luca Cattaneo | Italy | 51 | 26 | 11 | - | 14 | - |
| 25 | Hans Knauß | Austria | 49 | - | 32 | 1 | 16 | - |
| 26 | Lasse Kjus | Norway | 47 | 11 | - | 36 | - | - |
| 27 | Hannes Trinkl | Austria | 43 | - | - | 29 | 14 | - |
| 28 | Patrik Järbyn | Sweden | 38 | 3 | 22 | 13 | - | - |
| | Bruno Kernen | Switzerland | 38 | - | 7 | 11 | 20 | - |
| 30 | Janne Leskinen | Finland | 36 | - | - | 14 | - | 22 |
| 31 | Ian Piccard | France | 35 | 2 | 18 | 15 | - | - |
| 32 | Christophe Plé | France | 26 | 15 | - | - | 11 | - |
| 33 | Steve Locher | Switzerland | 21 | 9 | 12 | - | - | - |
| 34 | Marco Hangl | Switzerland | 20 | - | 20 | - | - | - |
| | Jürgen Hasler | Liechtenstein | 20 | - | 13 | - | 7 | - |
| 36 | Harald Christian Strand Nilsen | Norway | 19 | 18 | 1 | - | - | - |
| 37 | Franco Cavegn | Switzerland | 18 | - | - | 18 | - | - |
| 38 | Tobias Barnerssoi | Germany | 16 | 16 | - | - | - | - |
| 39 | Paul Accola | Switzerland | 14 | 13 | 1 | - | - | - |
| 40 | Kenneth Sivertsen | Norway | 13 | - | 8 | 5 | - | - |
| 41 | Jernej Koblar | Slovenia | 11 | - | 9 | - | 2 | - |
| 42 | Alberto Senigagliesi | Italy | 10 | - | 10 | - | - | - |
| | Daniel Brunner | Switzerland | 10 | - | - | - | 10 | - |
| 44 | Jean-Luc Crétier | France | 9 | - | - | 9 | - | - |
| | Xavier Fournier | France | 9 | - | - | - | 9 | - |
| 46 | Hans-Jörg Tauscher | Germany | 8 | 8 | - | - | - | - |
| 47 | William Besse | Switzerland | 6 | 6 | - | - | - | - |
| 48 | Asgeir Linberg | Norway | 5 | - | 5 | - | - | - |
| | Rainer Salzgeber | Austria | 5 | - | - | - | 5 | - |
| | Miran Rauter | Slovenia | 5 | - | 2 | 2 | 1 | - |
| 51 | Stephan Eberharter | Austria | 4 | 4 | - | - | - | - |
| | Patrick Holzer | Italy | 4 | - | - | 4 | - | - |
| 53 | Franck Piccard | France | 3 | - | - | 3 | - | - |
| | David Pretot | France | 3 | - | - | - | 3 | - |
| 55 | Achim Vogt | Liechtenstein | 1 | 1 | - | - | - | - |

Note:

In the last race only the best racers were allowed to compete and only the best 15 finishers were awarded with points.

Alpine skiing World Cup
Men

Overall | Downhill | Super-G | Giant slalom | Slalom | Combined

1995
