= 1994 Alpine Skiing World Cup – Men's downhill =

1994 Men's Downhill World Cup
Previous: 1993	Next: 1995

Men's downhill World Cup 1993/1994

== Final point standings ==
In men's downhill World Cup 1993/94 all results count. Marc Girardelli won the cup without winning a single competition.

Place	Name	Country	Total points	8 (Italy)	9 (Italy)	13 (Italy)	14 (Austria)	18 (Austria)	22 (Switzerland)	24 (France)	28 (United States)	29 (United States)	31 (Canada)	33 (United States)
1	Marc Girardelli	Luxembourg	556	60	20	80	50	80	80	32	60	22	36	36
2	Hannes Trinkl	Austria	536	36	-	100	-	40	40	60	100	-	80	80
3	Patrick Ortlieb	Austria	488	40	100	45	36	100	26	29	15	13	24	60
4	Cary Mullen	Canada	461	22	36	24	80	-	32	10	80	100	45	32
5	William Besse	Switzerland	446	4	26	14	15	60	100	40	29	18	40	100
6	Atle Skårdal	Norway	399	-	10	20	60	26	36	22	45	80	100	-
7	Ed Podivinsky	Canada	313	9	-	18	100	-	13	24	36	50	18	45
8	Tommy Moe	United States	308	8	15	60	32	32	12	18	-	11	60	60
9	Daniel Mahrer	Switzerland	302	26	80	22	-	36	18	20	26	16	29	29
10	Kjetil André Aamodt	Norway	296	-	32	-	26	15	45	100	24	15	15	24
11	Pietro Vitalini	Italy	254	14	40	50	11	-	29	14	36	60	-	-
12	Peter Runggaldier	Italy	248	-	16	32	-	18	80	2	20	24	16	40
13	Jean-Luc Crétier	France	231	-	60	9	22	16	-	80	-	32	12	-
14	Luc Alphand	France	227	-	-	29	45	14	15	36	-	26	36	26
15	Franco Cavegn	Switzerland	218	-	13	1	3	45	10	26	40	40	20	20
16	Franz Heinzer	Switzerland	212	-	4	2	24	-	-	15	50	45	50	22
17	Markus Foser	Liechtenstein	192	100	22	-	-	13	-	-	18	36	3	-
18	Rob Boyd	Canada	170	50	50	9	5	-	-	-	-	12	26	18
19	Kristian Ghedina	Italy	146	15	45	5	14	-	50	3	-	-	14	-
20	Armin Assinger	Austria	121	-	5	40	-	24	20	13	3	6	10	-
21	A. J. Kitt	United States	115	11	24	-	20	-	22	-	18	20	-	-
22	Ralf Socher	Canada	104	-	-	3	45	20	-	9	9	10	8	-
23	Luigi Colturi	Italy	97	-	29	11	-	9	3	45	-	-	-	-
24	Werner Franz	Austria	96	80	8	-	-	1	7	-	-	-	-	-
25	Christophe Plé	France	87	2	11	6	14	-	-	11	12	9	22	-
26	Jan Einar Thorsen	Norway	86	29	9	7	-	-	4	4	14	3	-	16
27	Lasse Kjus	Norway	83	-	-	-	-	50	14	12	-	-	7	-
28	Xavier Gigandet	Switzerland	81	-	-	10	-	29	24	7	6	5	-	-
29	Helmut Höflehner	Austria	71	4	8	-	-	-	-	50	5	4	-	-
	Kyle Rasmussen	United States	71	7	1	12	18	-	5	16	-	-	12	-
	Asgeir Linberg	Norway	71	13	12	-	10	-	6	6	22	1	1	-
32	Günther Mader	Austria	65	-	2	36	8	2	-	-	4	-	13	-
33	Werner Perathoner	Italy	62	24	1	-	-	-	-	-	8	29	-	-
	Franck Piccard	France	62	-	-	-	-	-	16	-	7	14	9	16
35	Nicolas Burtin	France	61	32	-	-	-	-	-	5	11	8	5	-
36	Darren Thorburn	Canada	54	45	-	-	-	-	9	-	-	-	-	-
37	Hans-Jörg Tauscher	Germany	45	1	18	26	-	-	-	-	-	-	-	-
38	Markus Wasmeier	Germany	44	-	-	18	-	12	11	1	-	2	-	-
39	Luke Sauder	Canada	39	20	-	-	16	3	-	-	-	-	-	-
40	David Pretot	France	34	-	-	-	29	-	-	-	2	-	3	-
41	Gianfranco Martin	Italy	29	-	6	15	-	-	-	8	-	-	-	-
42	Lionel Finance	France	26	18	-	-	-	-	8	-	-	-	-	-
43	Xavier Fournier	France	25	-	-	14	7	4	-	-	-	-	-	-
44	Martin Bell	United Kingdom	24	10	-	5	9	-	-	-	-	-	-	-
45	Graham Bell	United Kingdom	22	-	-	-	-	22	-	-	-	-	-	-
46	Lasse Arnesen	Norway	21	-	-	-	-	-	2	-	13	-	6	-
	Stefan Krauß	Germany	21	16	-	-	-	-	-	-	-	-	5	-
48	Fritz Strobl	Austria	18	-	-	-	-	11	-	-	-	7	-	-
49	Luca Cattaneo	Italy	15	7	-	-	-	8	-	-	-	-	-	-
50	Jeff Olson	United States	14	-	14	-	-	-	-	-	-	-	-	-
51	Jürgen Hasler	Liechtenstein	13	13	-	-	-	-	-	-	-	-	-	-
52	Patrik Järbyn	Sweden	12	-	-	-	12	-	-	-	-	-	-	-
	Craig Thrasher	United States	12	-	-	-	-	-	1	-	10	1	-	-
54	Marcel Sulliger	Switzerland	10	-	-	-	-	10	-	-	-	-	-	-
55	Martin Fiala	Germany	7	7	-	-	-	-	-	-	-	-	-	-
	Oswald Schranzhofer	Italy	7	-	-	-	-	7	-	-	-	-	-	-
57	Brian Stemmle	Canada	6	-	-	-	6	-	-	-	-	-	-	-
	Berni Huber	Germany	6	-	-	-	-	6	-	-	-	-	-	-
59	Roman Torn	Canada	5	-	-	-	-	5	-	-	-	-	-	-
60	Alessandro Fattori	Italy	4	-	-	-	4	-	-	-	-	-	-	-
61	Michael Lichtenegger	Austria	3	-	3	-	-	-	-	-	-	-	-	-
62	Harald Strand Nilsen	Norway	2	-	-	-	2	-	-	-	-	-	-	-
62	Max Rauffer	Germany	1	-	-	-	1	-	-	-	-	-	-	-
	Christophe Fivel	France	1	-	-	-	-	-	-	-	1	-	-	-

Alpine skiing World Cup
Men

Overall | Downhill | Super G | Giant | Slalom | Combined

1994
