= 1995 Alpine Skiing World Cup – Men's downhill =

1995 Men's downhill World Cup
Previous: 1994	Next: 1996

Men's downhill World Cup 1994/1995

== Calendar ==
Round	Race No	Place	Country	Date	Winner	Second	Third
1	5	Val d'Isère	France	December 16, 1994	(Austria) Josef Strobl	(France) Luc Alphand	(Austria) Günther Mader
2	6	Val d'Isère	France	December 17, 1994	(Austria) Armin Assinger	(Austria) Patrick Ortlieb	(Austria) Josef Strobl
3	13	Kitzbühel	Austria	January 13, 1995	(France) Luc Alphand	(Austria) Patrick Ortlieb	(Italy) Kristian Ghedina
4	14	Kitzbühel	Austria	January 14, 1995	(France) Luc Alphand	(Austria) Armin Assinger	(Italy) Werner Perathoner
5	18	Wengen	Switzerland	January 20, 1995	(Italy) Kristian Ghedina	(Austria) Peter Rzehak	(Austria) Hannes Trinkl
6	19	Wengen	Switzerland	January 21, 1995	(United States) Kyle Rasmussen	(Austria) Werner Franz	(Austria) Armin Assinger
7	25	Whistler Mountain	Canada	February 25, 1995	(Italy) Kristian Ghedina	(Norway) Lasse Kjus	(Austria) Patrick Ortlieb
8	28	Kvitfjell	Norway	March 11, 1995	(United States) Kyle Rasmussen	(Italy) Kristian Ghedina	(Austria) Patrick Ortlieb
9	29	Bormio	Italy	March 15, 1995	(France) Luc Alphand	(United States) A. J. Kitt	(Norway) Lasse Kjus

== Final point standings ==
In men's downhill World Cup 1994/95 all results count.

Place	Name	Country	Total points	5 (France)	6 (France)	13 (Austria)	14 (Austria)	18 (Switzerland)	19 (Switzerland)	25 (Canada)	28 (Norway)	29 (Italy)
1	Luc Alphand	France	484	80	36	100	100	36	12	20	-	100
2	Kristian Ghedina	Italy	473	20	4	60	24	100	45	100	80	40
3	Patrick Ortlieb	Austria	426	50	80	80	36	-	15	60	60	45
4	Armin Assinger	Austria	419	9	100	4	80	45	60	40	45	36
5	Josef Strobl	Austria	307	100	60	-	14	40	40	9	26	18
6	Kyle Rasmussen	United States	288	-	16	-	-	26	100	24	100	22
7	Hannes Trinkl	Austria	273	-	40	45	-	60	50	22	36	20
8	Werner Perathoner	Italy	269	36	32	-	60	29	4	36	40	32
9	Lasse Kjus	Norway	227	24	26	-	2	6	29	80	-	60
10	Jean-Luc Crétier	France	224	40	29	20	26	13	-	50	22	24
11	Günther Mader	Austria	221	60	50	22	40	-	-	7	16	26
12	Peter Rzehak	Austria	197	-	-	15	20	80	8	13	11	50
13	Werner Franz	Austria	192	29	18	36	16	11	80	2	-	-
	A. J. Kitt	United States	192	22	10	20	-	8	2	26	24	80
15	Pietro Vitalini	Italy	189	13	45	-	45	15	26	45	-	-
16	Xavier Gigandet	Switzerland	175	45	-	14	4	36	-	18	29	29
17	Atle Skårdal	Norway	168	14	14	29	9	50	16	4	32	-
18	Tommy Moe	United States	149	-	-	40	32	24	24	29	-	-
19	Ed Podivinsky	Canada	131	-	15	50	14	-	11	5	20	16
20	Urs Lehmann	Switzerland	97	15	9	24	3	-	14	32	-	-
21	Christophe Plé	France	96	29	3	-	-	16	32	3	13	-
22	Daniel Mahrer	Switzerland	95	18	11	-	-	-	-	16	50	-
23	Alessandro Fattori	Italy	87	6	-	3	50	10	-	-	18	-
24	Marc Girardelli	Luxembourg	73	4	6	12	-	20	20	11	-	-
25	Peter Runggaldier	Italy	71	-	7	-	22	18	18	6	-	-
26	Stefan Krauß	Germany	69	16	24	-	29	-	-	-	-	-
27	Asgeir Linberg	Norway	66	-	-	8	-	22	36	-	-	-
	Luigi Colturi	Italy	63	8	5	32	11	-	7	-	-	-
29	Franco Cavegn	Switzerland	59	-	1	7	7	14	9	14	7	-
30	David Pretot	France	54	-	-	-	15	12	22	-	5	-
31	William Besse	Switzerland	45	32	-	-	-	3	-	10	-	-
	Brian Stemmle	Canada	45	10	20	11	-	-	-	-	4	-
33	Kjetil André Aamodt	Norway	43	-	-	-	20	2	6	15	-	-
	Christian Greber	Austria	43	-	-	16	9	-	10	-	8	-
35	Cary Mullen	Canada	33	-	-	-	-	9	-	12	12	-
36	Craig Thrasher	United States	32	-	12	5	-	-	-	-	15	-
37	Chad Fleischer	United States	31	-	22	-	-	-	-	-	9	-
38	Daniel Brunner	Switzerland	29	11	-	-	-	4	-	-	14	-
39	Markus Herrmann	Switzerland	26	-	-	26	-	-	-	-	-	-
	Heinrich Rupp	Switzerland	26	1	8	-	6	-	-	1	10	-
41	Graham Bell	United Kingdom	22	-	-	10	12	-	-	-	-	-
42	Ralf Socher	Canada	21	12	-	9	-	-	-	-	-	-
43	Roman Torn	Canada	20	7	-	-	-	7	-	-	6	-
	Bruno Kernen	Switzerland	20	2	-	6	10	-	-	-	2	-
45	Stephan Eberharter	Austria	19	3	2	14	-	-	-	-	-	-
46	Luke Sauder	Canada	14	6	-	-	-	-	-	8	-	-
47	Lionel Finance	France	13	-	13	-	-	-	-	-	-	-
	Luca Cattaneo	Italy	13	-	-	-	-	-	13	-	-	-
49	Lasse Arnesen	Norway	8	-	-	-	-	5	3	-	-	-
50	Berni Huber	Germany	6	-	-	1	-	-	5	-	-	-
51	Michael Lichtenegger	Austria	5	-	-	-	5	-	-	-	-	-
	Markus Foser	Liechtenstein	5	-	-	-	1	-	-	-	4	-
53	Reggie Crist	United States	4	-	-	3	-	1	-	-	-	-
54	Kenneth Sivertsen	Norway	1	-	-	-	-	-	1	-	-	-
	Franck Piccard	France	1	-	-	-	-	-	-	-	1	-

Note:

In the last race only the best racers were allowed to compete and only the best 15 finishers were awarded with points.

Alpine Skiing World Cup
Men

Overall | Downhill | Super G | Giant slalom | Slalom | Combined

1995
