= 1994 Alpine Skiing World Cup – Men's super-G =

1994 Men's Super G World Cup
Previous: 1993	Next: 1995

In the men's super G World Cup 1993/94 all results count. Jan Einar Thorsen won the cup with only one race win. All races were won by a different athlete.

== Final point standings ==
Place	Name	Country	Total points	5 (France)	12 (Austria)	23 (Switzerland)	32 (Canada)	34 (United States)
1	Jan Einar Thorsen	Norway	280	50	18	80	32	100
2	Marc Girardelli	Luxembourg	274	24	45	100	80	26
3	Tommy Moe	United States	242	60	16	26	100	40
4	Kjetil André Aamodt	Norway	207	80	32	-	45	50
5	Atle Skårdal	Norway	202	40	40	60	26	36
	Günther Mader	Austria	202	100	26	22	32	22
7	Lasse Kjus	Norway	194	10	22	32	50	80
8	Hannes Trinkl	Austria	165	5	100	40	-	20
9	Hans Knauß	Austria	152	12	26	36	18	60
10	Markus Wasmeier	Germany	141	36	50	45	10	-
	Daniel Mahrer	Switzerland	141	45	-	29	22	45
12	Werner Perathoner	Italy	140	-	80	-	60	-
13	Armin Assinger	Austria	134	-	60	50	24	-
14	Kyle Rasmussen	United States	114	14	12	20	36	32
15	Cary Mullen	Canada	74	-	-	13	45	16
16	William Besse	Switzerland	69	32	-	24	13	-
17	Luc Alphand	France	66	10	13	6	13	24
18	Alessandro Fattori	Italy	64	26	20	12	6	-
19	Marco Hangl	Switzerland	55	22	-	18	15	-
20	Fredrik Nyberg	Sweden	50	5	15	1	-	29
21	Patrick Ortlieb	Austria	41	-	-	14	9	18
22	Franck Piccard	France	40	29	-	-	11	-
23	Janne Leskinen	Finland	36	-	36	-	-	-
	Peter Runggaldier	Italy	36	6	4	12	14	-
25	Lasse Arnesen	Norway	35	15	-	-	20	-
26	Christophe Plé	France	34	16	-	12	6	-
27	Josef Polig	Italy	29	-	29	-	-	-
	Ian Piccard	France	29	5	11	5	8	-
29	Franz Heinzer	Switzerland	27	11	-	-	16	-
30	Steve Locher	Switzerland	26	-	14	12	-	-
31	Paul Accola	Switzerland	25	18	-	-	7	-
32	Pietro Vitalini	Italy	21	-	6	15	-	-
33	Tobias Barnerssoi	Germany	20	20	-	-	-	-
34	Franco Cavegn	Switzerland	16	-	-	16	-	-
35	Dietmar Thöni	Austria	15	13	-	2	-	-
36	Harald Strand Nilsen	Norway	13	8	5	-	-	-
37	Rainer Salzgeber	Austria	10	-	10	-	-	-
	Didrik Marksten	Norway	10	-	10	-	-	-
39	Kristian Ghedina	Italy	9	1	-	8	-	-
40	Miran Rauter	Slovenia	8	-	8	-	-	-
	Ed Podivinsky	Canada	8	-	-	8	-	-
42	Armand Schiele	France	7	7	-	-	-	-
	Chad Fleischer	United States	7	-	7	-	-	-
44	Yvan Eggenberger	Switzerland	5	-	-	5	-	-
45	A. J. Kitt	United States	4	-	-	-	4	-
	Asgeir Linberg	Norway	4	-	-	-	4	-
	Patrik Järbyn	Sweden	4	-	-	3	1	-
48	Stefan Krauß	Germany	3	-	3	-	-	-
49	Gianfranco Martin	Italy	2	2	-	-	-	-
	Tom Stiansen	Norway	2	-	2	-	-	-
	Tobias Hellman	Sweden	2	-	-	-	2	-
52	Mario Reiter	Austria	1	-	1	-	-	-
	Patrick Holzer	Italy	1	-	1	-	-	-

Note:

In the last race only the best racers were allowed to compete and only the best 15 finishers were awarded with points.

Alpine skiing World Cup
Men

Overall | Downhill | Super G | Giant slalom | Slalom | Combined

1994
