= 1996 Alpine Skiing World Cup – Men's downhill =

Alpine Skiing World Championship

1996 Men's downhill World Cup
Previous: 1995	Next: 1997

Men's downhill World Cup 1995/1996

== Final point standings ==
In men's downhill World Cup 1995/96 all results count.

Place	Name	Country	Total points	6 (United States)	8 (France)	10 (Italy)	15 (Italy)	18 (Austria)	22 (Switzerland)	23 (Switzerland)	28 (Germany)	32 (Norway)
1	Luc Alphand	France	577	100	100	60	3	80	9	80	100	45
2	Günther Mader	Austria	407	36	50	22	36	100	6	32	45	80
3	Patrick Ortlieb	Austria	359	60	15	100	-	32	32	80	40	-
4	Lasse Kjus	Norway	343	80	-	45	100	-	-	-	18	100
5	Bruno Kernen	Switzerland	325	-	32	1	16	26	100	100	14	36
6	Xavier Gigandet	Switzerland	274	50	45	80	-	-	50	29	20	-
7	Peter Runggaldier	Italy	261	22	10	-	40	60	3	16	60	50
8	Kristian Ghedina	Italy	237	18	-	24	20	50	-	15	50	60
9	Werner Perathoner	Italy	233	-	24	12	50	36	16	40	26	29
10	Brian Stemmle	Canada	230	24	-	32	2	11	45	36	80	-
11	Daniel Mahrer	Switzerland	186	-	14	4	-	13	60	45	10	40
12	Atle Skårdal	Norway	180	8	22	5	12	10	36	-	36	18
13	William Besse	Switzerland	176	9	-	9	-	14	80	26	22	16
14	Roland Assinger	Austria	172	40	80	-	26	-	-	-	-	26
15	Werner Franz	Austria	166	14	16	9	14	4	29	50	8	22
16	Ed Podivinsky	Canada	164	26	18	15	60	-	6	-	15	24
17	Hannes Trinkl	Austria	130	7	60	13	20	-	-	14	-	16
18	Kyle Rasmussen	United States	121	1	12	29	-	24	40	13	2	-
19	Andreas Schifferer	Austria	120	-	40	-	80	-	-	-	-	-
20	Peter Rzehak	Austria	111	15	9	11	-	45	7	-	24	-
21	Franco Cavegn	Switzerland	101	32	36	9	24	-	-	-	-	-
22	Markus Herrmann	Switzerland	98	-	-	45	7	1	1	12	-	32
23	Hans Knauß	Austria	95	-	13	29	13	32	-	4	4	-
24	Rob Boyd	Canada	87	-	-	-	-	40	12	22	13	-
25	Pietro Vitalini	Italy	78	6	-	36	-	20	-	-	16	-
26	Josef Strobl	Austria	76	-	26	-	8	-	13	-	29	-
27	Fredrik Nyberg	Sweden	73	45	7	-	10	-	11	-	-	-
28	Stefan Krauß	Germany	71	3	-	3	29	8	26	2	-	-
29	Berni Huber	Germany	67	-	20	14	6	7	15	-	5	-
30	Ralf Socher	Canada	64	-	-	-	-	22	22	20	-	-
31	Alessandro Fattori	Italy	59	-	-	-	9	12	20	18	-	-
32	David Pretot	France	54	-	5	-	-	15	-	24	10	-
33	Markus Foser	Liechtenstein	52	2	-	50	-	-	-	-	-	-
34	Jürgen Hasler	Liechtenstein	42	13	29	-	-	-	-	-	-	-
35	Kenneth Sivertsen	Norway	41	29	-	-	12	-	-	-	-	-
36	Jean-Luc Crétier	France	40	-	-	-	32	6	2	-	-	-
	Adrien Duvillard	France	40	-	-	-	11	16	8	5	-	-
38	Luca Cattaneo	Italy	39	16	12	-	-	-	-	-	11	-
39	Max Rauffer	Germany	35	-	-	-	-	-	-	3	32	-
40	Didier Cuche	Switzerland	31	-	-	10	5	9	-	-	7	-
41	Maurizio Feller	Italy	28	-	4	-	-	-	24	-	-	-
42	Christian Greber	Austria	27	5	-	-	22	-	-	-	-	-
	Rainer Salzgeber	Austria	27	20	-	-	-	-	-	7	-	-
44	Urs Lehmann	Switzerland	26	-	6	20	-	-	-	-	-	-
	Xavier Fournier	France	26	-	-	-	-	18	-	8	-	-
	Kjetil André Aamodt	Norway	26	-	-	-	-	-	-	-	6	20
47	Luke Sauder	Canada	25	-	3	18	-	-	4	-	-	-
	Marc Girardelli	Luxembourg	25	-	-	-	15	-	-	10	-	-
49	Christophe Plé	France	23	11	-	-	-	-	-	-	12	-
50	Daniel Brunner	Switzerland	22	-	1	-	-	-	10	11	-	-
51	Darren Thorburn	Canada	21	-	-	-	4	3	14	-	-	-
52	Alberto Senigagliesi	Italy	20	-	-	-	-	-	20	-	-	-
	Chad Fleischer	United States	20	-	8	6	-	-	-	6	-	-
54	Cary Mullen	Canada	19	-	-	18	-	-	-	-	1	-
55	Asgeir Linberg	Norway	12	12	-	-	-	-	-	-	-	-
56	A. J. Kitt	United States	11	11	-	-	-	-	-	-	-	-
57	Paul Accola	Switzerland	10	-	-	-	-	-	-	10	-	-
58	Graham Bell	United Kingdom	6	-	-	-	1	5	-	-	-	-
59	Andrey Filichkin	Russia	4	4	-	-	-	-	-	-	-	-
60	Graydon Oldfield	Canada	3	-	-	3	-	-	-	-	-	-
	Denis Rey	France	3	-	-	-	-	-	-	-	3	-
62	Craig Thrasher	United States	2	-	2	-	-	-	-	-	-	-
	Patrik Järbyn	Sweden	2	-	-	-	-	2	-	-	-	-
64	Åne Sæter	Norway	1	-	-	-	-	-	-	1	-	-

Note:

In the last race only the best racers were allowed to compete and only the best 15 finishers were awarded with points.

Alpine Skiing World Cup
Men

Overall | Downhill | Super G | Giant slalom | Slalom | Combined

1996
