= 1993 Alpine Skiing World Cup – Men's super-G =

1993 Men's Super G World Cup
Previous: 1992	Next: 1994

Men's super G World Cup 1992/1993

== Final point standings ==
In men's super G World Cup 1992/93 all results count.

Place	Name	Country	Total points	3 (France)	11 (Austria)	16 (Austria)	25 (Canada)	26 (United States)	30 (Norway)	32 (Sweden)
1	Kjetil André Aamodt	Norway	420	-	60	24	36	100	100	100
2	Günther Mader	Austria	307	29	6	60	100	-	32	80
3	Franz Heinzer	Switzerland	301	80	14	18	80	36	13	60
4	Jan Einar Thorsen	Norway	294	100	50	80	26	10	4	24
5	Marc Girardelli	Luxembourg	216	-	20	100	40	40	-	16
6	Daniel Mahrer	Switzerland	213	12	-	10	29	30	80	22
7	Patrick Ortlieb	Austria	198	45	-	16	60	-	32	45
8	Luigi Colturi	Italy	181	60	-	40	4	-	45	32
9	Marco Hangl	Switzerland	176	-	45	45	14	22	-	50
10	Armin Assinger	Austria	173	18	100	11	-	3	15	26
11	Atle Skårdal	Norway	169	50	24	50	45	-	-	-
12	Stephan Eberharter	Austria	158	-	-	26	16	80	-	36
13	Markus Wasmeier	Germany	135	-	32	-	50	32	3	18
14	Alberto Senigagliesi	Italy	117	36	40	5	32	4	-	-
15	Patrik Järbyn	Sweden	106	4	36	-	-	16	50	-
16	Leonhard Stock	Austria	100	-	80	-	-	-	-	20
17	Paul Accola	Switzerland	83	8	-	-	10	20	-	45
18	Josef Polig	Italy	78	40	-	14	-	24	-	-
19	Tom Stiansen	Norway	77	22	9	22	24	-	-	-
20	Luc Alphand	France	72	14	26	32	-	-	-	-
21	Adrien Duvillard	France	69	-	-	36	7	-	26	-
	Fredrik Nyberg	Sweden	69	6	12	-	18	11	22	-
	Ole Kristian Furuseth	Norway	69	15	-	-	-	45	9	-
24	Steve Locher	Switzerland	68	10	13	-	-	6	10	29
25	Dietmar Thöni	Austria	65	-	5	-	-	-	60	-
26	Tommy Moe	United States	62	-	4	-	22	-	36	-
27	Thierry Gentina	France	56	26	22	8	-	-	-	-
	Hansjörg Tauscher	Germany	56	26	18	4	8	-	-	-
29	Christophe Plé	France	52	-	29	-	13	3	7	-
30	Hans Knauß	Austria	50	-	-	-	-	50	-	-
	Tobias Hellman	Sweden	50	9	-	-	-	29	12	-
32	Cary Mullen	Canada	46	-	-	-	6	-	40	-
33	Asgeir Linberg	Norway	45	11	3	1	3	16	11	-
34	William Besse	Switzerland	44	-	16	20	-	-	8	-
35	Werner Perathoner	Italy	39	-	10	7	22	-	-	-
36	Peter Rzehak	Austria	38	-	-	-	9	5	24	-
37	Didrik Marksten	Norway	32	32	-	-	-	-	-	-
	Lasse Kjus	Norway	32	-	11	12	2	7	-	-
39	Rainer Salzgeber	Austria	29	-	-	29	-	-	-	-
	Harald Strand Nilsen	Norway	29	-	-	-	-	29	-	-
	Franck Piccard	France	29	16	-	-	5	8	-	-
	Jean-Luc Crétier	France	29	-	1	-	-	13	15	-
43	A. J. Kitt	United States	28	13	-	-	12	-	3	-
44	Denis Rey	France	27	20	-7	-	-	-	-	-
45	Marcel Sulliger	Switzerland	25	-	-	15	-	10	-	-
	Daniel Caduff	Switzerland	25	-	-	-	-	20	5	-
47	Lasse Arnesen	Norway	21	-	8	13	-	-	-	-
48	Alessandro Fattori	Italy	20	-	-	-	-	-	20	-
49	Bruno Kernen	Switzerland	19	-	-	3	16	-	-	-
50	Ian Piccard	France	18	-	-	-	-	-	18	-
51	Peter Runggaldier	Italy	17	-	-	3	-	14	-	-
52	Janne Leskinen	Finland	16	-	-	-	-	-	16	-
53	Urs Lehmann	Switzerland	15	-	15	-	-	-	-	-
54	Urs Kälin	Switzerland	13	-	-	-	-	12	1	-
55	Hannes Trinkl	Austria	11	-	-	-	11	-	-	-
56	Gianfranco Martin	Italy	9	-	-	9	-	-	-	-
57	Kyle Rasmussen	United States	8	2	-	6	-	-	-	-
58	Erik Schlopy	United States	7	7	-	-	-	-	-	-
59	Todd Kelly	United States	6	6	-	-	-	-	-	-
	Pietro Vitalini	Italy	6	-	-	-	-	-	6	-
61	Sergio Bergamelli	Italy	3	3	-	-	-	-	-	-
62	Attilio Barcella	Italy	2	2	-	-	-	-	-	-
	Bill Hudson	United States	2	-	2	-	-	-	-	-
64	Jeff Olson	United States	1	-	-	-	1	-	-	-
	Michael Lichtenegger	Austria	1	-	-	-	-	1	-	-

Note:

In the last race only the best racers were allowed to compete and only the best 15 finishers were awarded with points.

Alpine skiing World Cup
Men

Overall | Downhill | Super G | Giant slalom | Slalom | Combined

1993
