= 1993 Alpine Skiing World Cup – Men's downhill =

1993 Men's Downhill World Cup
Previous: 1992	Next: 1994

Men's downhill World Cup 1992/1993

== Final point standings ==
In men's downhill World Cup 1992/93 all results count. Franz Heinzer won his third Downhill title in a row.

Place	Name	Country	Total points	5 (Italy)	6 (Italy)	13 (Germany)	15 (Germany)	17 (Austria)	21 (Switzerland)	24 (Canada)	27 (Spain)	28 (Norway)	29 (Norway)
1	Franz Heinzer	Switzerland	527	40	24	100	60	100	100	60	10	7	26
2	Atle Skårdal	Norway	427	36	40	15	29	50	50	100	18	60	29
3	William Besse	Switzerland	366	100	80	26	10	24	60	7	-	9	50
4	Armin Assinger	Austria	360	20	7	10	32	22	-	29	100	40	100
5	Daniel Mahrer	Switzerland	343	15	29	6	100	36	26	14	80	15	22
6	Marc Girardelli	Luxembourg	331	29	50	45	45	40	22	36	16	3	45
7	Patrick Ortlieb	Austria	272	60	26	-	-	45	80	32	-	5	24
8	Hannes Trinkl	Austria	264	26	12	50	20	-	36	-	60	-	60
9	Werner Perathoner	Italy	256	8	14	2	8	26	16	9	13	80	80
10	Peter Rzehak	Austria	255	6	-	18	80	15	32	40	-	50	14
11	Adrien Duvillard	France	206	-	-	29	-	32	-	8	26	100	11
12	Pietro Vitalini	Italy	203	10	9	80	-	22	29	3	32	-	18
13	Günther Mader	Austria	192	-	-	60	26	60	8	13	24	1	-
14	Leonhard Stock	Austria	188	50	100	14	15	9	-	-	-	-	-
	Peter Runggaldier	Italy	188	12	20	12	36	80	2	5	6	6	9
16	Christophe Plé	France	185	4	1	5	13	1	40	45	40	36	-
17	Markus Wasmeier	Germany	171	-	-	40	40	5	13	20	11	10	32
18	Bruno Kernen	Switzerland	169	3	-	20	6	-	45	24	12	45	14
19	Tommy Moe	United States	164	13	22	-	5	4	-	80	22	18	-
	Jan Einar Thorsen	Norway	164	80	15	-	2	14	-	18	14	11	10
21	A. J. Kitt	United States	156	24	60	-	-	7	18	-	45	2	-
22	Denis Rey	France	144	11	18	32	50	18	15	-	-	-	-
23	Urs Lehmann	Switzerland	142	50	36	-	12	-	15	-	29	-	-
24	Helmut Höflehner	Austria	136	32	32	-	14	-	-	10	7	29	12
25	Cary Mullen	Canada	125	-	-	-	-	-	24	50	36	-	15
26	Michael Lichtenegger	Austria	112	-	45	9	9	-	20	-	-	24	5
27	Kristian Ghedina	Italy	110	22	-	22	24	16	7	11	8	-	-
28	Kjetil André Aamodt	Norway	90	2	-	4	3	-	3	13	20	-	45
29	Xavier Gigandet	Switzerland	83	16	-	7	-	10	-	-	50	-	-
30	Ralf Socher	Canada	80	-	-	-	-	8	-	22	-	32	18
31	Luigi Colturi	Italy	76	-	-	24	22	2	1	-	5	22	-
32	Josef Polig	Italy	67	-	-	-	-	-	-	-	-	22	45
33	Hans-Jörg Tauscher	Germany	65	18	11	36	-	-	-	-	-	-	-
34	Rob Boyd	Canada	64	-	2	-	16	1	4	26	15	-	-
35	Franck Piccard	France	61	-	-	11	18	12	-	-	-	16	4
36	Lasse Arnesen	Norway	54	-	16	-	-	29	-	6	3	-	-
37	Brian Stemmle	Canada	53	14	5	13	-	-	-	-	-	13	8
38	Franco Cavegn	Switzerland	42	-	4	18	-	-	11	-	9	-	-
39	Luca Cattaneo	Italy	40	-	8	-	-	-	-	-	-	26	6
40	Luc Alphand	France	39	7	-	8	12	-	12	-	-	-	-
41	Asgeir Linberg	Norway	34	6	13	-	4	11	-	-	-	-	-
	Daniel Carduff	Switzerland	34	-	-	-	-	-	-	-	-	12	22
43	Jeff Olson	United States	26	-	11	-	-	-	-	15	-	-	-
44	Christophe Fivel	France	19	-	-	-	-	-	-	19	-	-	-
45	Gianfranco Martin	Italy	18	-	-	-	-	13	1	2	-	-	2
46	Armand Schiele	France	14	-	-	-	-	-	-	-	-	14	-
47	Lionel Finance	France	13	-	-	-	7	6	-	-	-	-	-
48	Werner Franz	Austria	12	9	3	-	-	-	-	-	-	-	-
	Steve Locher	Switzerland	12	-	-	-	1	-	-	-	-	4	7
50	Stephan Eberharter	Austria	10	-	-	-	-	-	10	-	-	-	-
	Jean-Luc Crétier	France	10	-	6	-	-	-	-	1	-	-	3
52	Ed Podivinsky	Canada	9	-	-	-	-	-	9	-	-	-	-
	Patrik Järbyn	Sweden	9	-	-	-	-	-	-	-	-	9	-
54	Xavier Fournier	France	7	-	-	-	-	-	7	-	-	-	-
55	Michael Haas	Austria	5	-	-	-	-	-	5	-	-	-	-
56	Bill Hudson	United States	4	-	-	-	-	-	-	4	-	-	-
	Paul Accola	Switzerland	4	-	-	-	-	-	-	-	4	-	-
58	Martin Fiala	Germany	3	-	-	3	-	-	-	-	-	-	-
	Hubert Strolz	Austria	3	-	-	-	-	3	-	-	-	-	-
60	Franz Teppan	Austria	2	-	-	2	-	-	-	-	-	-	-
	Martin Bell	United Kingdom	2	-	-	-	-	-	-	-	2	-	-
62	Stefan Krauß	Germany	1	1	-	-	-	-	-	-	-	-	-
	Jostein Haugen	Norway	1	-	-	-	-	-	-	-	1	-	-
	Harald Strand Nilsen	Norway	1	-	-	-	-	-	-	-	-	-	1

Alpine skiing World Cup
Men

Overall | Downhill | Super G | Giant | Slalom | Combined

1993
