= 1996 Alpine Skiing World Cup – Men's super-G =

1996 Men's Super G World Cup
Previous: 1995	Next: 1997

Men's super G World Cup 1995/1996

== Final point standings ==
In men's super G World Cup 1995/96 all results count. Atle Skårdal won the cup with only one race win. All races were won by different skiers.

Place	Name	Country	Total points	7 (United States)	9 (France)	26 (France)	29 (Germany)	31 (Japan)	33 (Norway)
1	Atle Skårdal	Norway	312	20	100	80	-	80	32
2	Hans Knauß	Austria	267	29	60	100	18	60	-
3	Lasse Kjus	Norway	264	100	80	-	-	24	60
4	Luc Alphand	France	262	36	-	40	80	26	80
5	Peter Runggaldier	Italy	239	15	45	29	-	100	50
6	Richard Kröll	Austria	223	80	29	16	36	40	22
7	Fredrik Nyberg	Sweden	217	45	36	60	20	11	45
8	Kjetil André Aamodt	Norway	179	-	-	32	18	29	100
9	Werner Perathoner	Italy	173	26	-	22	100	5	20
10	Kristian Ghedina	Italy	170	40	13	26	40	22	29
11	Günther Mader	Austria	157	-	16	50	5	50	36
12	Patrick Wirth	Austria	150	12	-	16	60	36	26
13	Alessandro Fattori	Italy	148	-	50	45	8	45	-
14	Bruno Kernen	Switzerland	122	-	26	18	15	18	45
15	Pietro Vitalini	Italy	116	60	24	-	32	-	-
16	Janne Leskinen	Finland	94	-	-	24	50	20	-
17	Stefan Krauß	Germany	93	15	15	8	50	5	-
18	Daron Rahlves	United States	79	13	12	40	14	-	-
19	Patrik Järbyn	Sweden	77	50	-	9	5	13	-
20	Hannes Trinkl	Austria	76	22	40	-	14	-	-
21	Andrey Filichkin	Russia	52	9	14	-	29	-	-
22	William Besse	Switzerland	50	24	-	11	-	15	-
	Josef Strobl	Austria	50	-	32	-	3	15	-
24	Marco Hangl	Switzerland	47	-	20	20	-	7	-
25	Chad Fleischer	United States	40	-	-	-	24	16	-
26	Ed Podivinsky	Canada	39	-	18	14	7	-	-
27	Patrick Ortlieb	Austria	38	6	22	-	10	-	-
	Peter Rzehak	Austria	38	32	-	-	6	-	-
29	Steve Locher	Switzerland	35	4	5	-	26	-	-
30	Jernej Koblar	Slovenia	33	-	-	11	22	-	-
31	Ian Piccard	France	32	-	8	13	11	-	-
	Benjamin Melquiond	France	32	-	-	-	-	32	-
33	Kyle Rasmussen	United States	31	18	-	-	-	13	-
34	Hermann Maier	Austria	24	-	-	-	-	-	24
35	Christian Greber	Austria	19	7	12	-	-	-	-
36	Kilian Albrecht	Austria	18	-	-	-	-	-	18
37	Aleš Brezavšček	Slovenia	17	12	-	5	-	-	-
38	Franco Cavegn	Switzerland	16	16	-	-	-	-	-
	Luca Cattaneo	Italy	16	6	10	-	-	-	-
	Didier Défago	Switzerland	16	-	-	-	-	-	16
41	Tobias Barnerssoi	Germany	12	12	-	-	-	-	-
	Harald Strand Nilsen	Norway	12	-	-	12	-	-	-
	Paul Accola	Switzerland	12	8	-	4	-	-	-
	Erik Seletto	Italy	12	-	-	-	12	-	-
45	Patrice Manuel	France	11	-	6	3	-	2	-
	David Prétot	France	11	-	-	-	10	1	-
47	Christophe Plé	France	10	-	10	-	-	-	-
	Thomas Grandi	Canada	10	-	-	7	3	-	-
	Didier Cuche	Switzerland	10	-	-	-	-	10	-
50	Kenneth Sivertsen	Norway	9	-	-	-	-	9	-
51	Daniel Mahrer	Switzerland	8	-	-	-	-	8	-
	Marc Girardelli	Luxembourg	8	-	-	1	1	6	-
53	Miran Rauter	Slovenia	7	-	7	-	-	-	-
	Xavier Gigandet	Switzerland	7	4	3	-	-	-	-
55	Alberto Senigagliesi	Italy	6	-	-	6	-	-	-
56	Xavier Fournier	France	4	-	4	-	-	-	-
57	Jürgen Hasler	Liechtenstein	3	2	1	-	-	-	-
	Markus Herrmann	Switzerland	3	-	-	-	-	3	-
59	Tobias Hellman	Sweden	2	-	2	-	-	-	-
	Achim Vogt	Liechtenstein	2	-	-	2	-	-	-
61	Rainer Salzgeber	Austria	1	1	-	-	-	-	-

Note:

In the last race only the best racers were allowed to compete and only the best 15 finishers were awarded with points.

Alpine skiing World Cup
Men

Overall | Downhill | Super G | Giant slalom | Slalom | Combined

1996
