= 1995 Alpine Skiing World Cup – Men's slalom =

1995 Men's slalom World Cup
Previous: 1994	Next: 1996

Men's slalom World Cup 1994/1995

== Calendar ==
Round	Race No	Place	Country	Date	Winner	Second	Third
1	2	Tignes	France	December 4, 1994	(Italy) Alberto Tomba	(Austria) Michael Tritscher	(Sweden) Thomas Fogdö
2	4	Sestriere	Italy	December 12, 1994	(Italy) Alberto Tomba	(Sweden) Thomas Fogdö	(Austria) Michael Tritscher
3	8	Lech am Arlberg	Austria	December 20, 1994	(Italy) Alberto Tomba	(Austria) Thomas Sykora	(Slovenia) Jure Košir
4	9	Lech am Arlberg	Austria	December 21, 1994	(Italy) Alberto Tomba	(Austria) Thomas Sykora	(Austria) Michael Tritscher
5	12	Garmisch-Partenkirchen	Germany	January 8, 1995	(Italy) Alberto Tomba	(Luxembourg) Marc Girardelli	(France) Yves Dimier
6	15	Kitzbühel	Austria	January 15, 1995	(Italy) Alberto Tomba	(Slovenia) Jure Košir	(Norway) Ole Kristian Furuseth
7	20	Wengen	Switzerland	January 22, 1995	(Italy) Alberto Tomba	(Switzerland) Michael von Grünigen	(Slovenia) Jure Košir
8	23	Furano	Japan	February 19, 1995	(Austria) Michael Tritscher	(Austria) Mario Reiter	(Norway) Ole Kristian Furuseth
9	32	Bormio	Italy	March 19, 1995	(Norway) Ole Kristian Furuseth	(Austria) Thomas Stangassinger	(France) Yves Dimier

== Final point standings ==
In men's slalom World Cup 1994/95 all results count.

Place	Name	Country	Total points	2 (France)	4 (Italy)	8 (Austria)	9 (Austria)	12 (Germany)	15 (Austria)	20 (Switzerland)	23 (Japan)	32 (Italy)
1	Alberto Tomba	Italy	700	100	100	100	100	100	100	100	-	-
2	Michael Tritscher	Austria	477	80	60	50	60	50	45	32	100	-
3	Jure Košir	Slovenia	405	-	50	60	40	45	80	60	50	20
4	Ole Kristian Furuseth	Norway	401	50	26	36	45	24	60	-	60	100
5	Mario Reiter	Austria	341	26	36	22	29	40	50	36	80	22
6	Thomas Sykora	Austria	302	24	32	80	80	-	36	-	-	50
7	Michael von Grünigen	Switzerland	282	45	24	45	-	-	12	80	36	40
8	Sébastien Amiez	France	279	-	40	29	36	36	40	24	45	29
9	Thomas Fogdö	Sweden	269	60	80	-	50	-	29	50	-	-
	Marc Girardelli	Luxembourg	269	4	-	18	32	80	24	26	40	45
11	Thomas Stangassinger	Austria	265	13	45	20	22	20	20	45	-	80
12	Yves Dimier	France	212	22	20	8	16	60	-	-	26	60
13	Finn Christian Jagge	Norway	194	32	-	24	26	18	22	40	-	32
14	Kjetil André Aamodt	Norway	179	36	29	26	13	22	-	-	29	24
15	Bernhard Bauer	Germany	158	29	-	12	18	26	18	29	-	26
16	Bernhard Gstrein	Austria	136	20	16	40	20	-	7	22	11	-
17	Kiminobu Kimura	Japan	132	8	22	13	24	32	15	-	-	18
18	Andrea Zinsli	Switzerland	110	40	-	32	-	-	-	14	24	-
19	Andrej Miklavc	Slovenia	108	-	-	14	15	29	32	18	-	-
20	Christian Mayer	Austria	99	6	15	15	14	13	-	20	-	16
21	Fabio De Crignis	Italy	94	12	-	11	-	-	-	3	32	36
22	Siegfried Voglreiter	Austria	68	14	14	-	-	-	13	12	15	-
23	Dietmar Thöni	Austria	65	5	18	16	-	-	26	-	-	-
24	Lasse Kjus	Norway	54	18	-	-	-	15	8	13	-	-
25	Konrad Ladstätter	Italy	48	10	13	-	9	-	-	16	-	-
26	Stanley Hayer	Canada	47	7	8	-	-	-	10	-	22	-
27	Gregor Grilc	Slovenia	46	15	-	6	-	-	-	9	16	-
28	Mika Marila	Finland	45	-	11	-	6	14	14	-	-	-
	Mitja Kunc	Slovenia	45	16	-	10	11	-	-	8	-	-
30	Patrick Staub	Switzerland	43	9	5	-	-	-	-	15	14	-
31	Harald Christian Strand Nilsen	Norway	40	-	6	-	8	-	16	10	-	-
	François Simond	France	35	-	-	10	12	-	-	5	8	-
33	Günther Mader	Austria	32	-	-	-	-	-	6	6	20	-
	Matthew Grosjean	United States	32	-	12	-	4	-	11	-	5	-
35	Rob Crossan	Canada	26	12	-	7	-	-	-	-	7	-
36	Johan Wallner	Sweden	22	-	-	-	10	-	-	-	12	-
37	Max Ancenay	France	21	-	10	-	-	-	4	7	-	-
38	Eric Villiard	Canada	18	-	-	-	7	-	-	11	-	-
	Matjaž Vrhovnik	Slovenia	18	-	-	-	-	-	-	-	18	-
	Takuya Ishioka	Japan	18	-	9	-	-	-	-	-	9	-
41	Alois Vogl	Germany	16	-	-	-	-	16	-	-	-	-
42	Fabrizio Tescari	Italy	13	-	-	-	-	-	9	4	-	-
	Angelo Weiss	Italy	13	-	-	-	-	-	-	-	13	-
44	Norman Bergamelli	Italy	10	-	-	-	-	-	-	-	10	-
45	Roger Pramotton	Italy	7	-	7	-	-	-	-	-	-	-
46	Gaetan Llorach	France	6	-	-	-	-	-	-	-	6	-
47	Thomas Grandi	Canada	5	-	-	-	5	-	-	-	-	-
	Richard Gravier	France	5	-	-	-	-	-	5	-	-	-
49	Didier Plaschy	Switzerland	3	-	-	-	3	-	-	-	-	-

Note:

In the last race only the best racers were allowed to compete and only the best 15 finishers were awarded with points.

Alpine Skiing World Cup
Men

Overall | Downhill | Super G | Giant slalom | Slalom | Combined

1995
