= 1994 Alpine Skiing World Cup – Men's slalom =

Alpine ski discipline year standings

1994 Men's slalom World Cup
Previous: 1993	Next: 1995

1994 World Cup

Overall | Downhill | Super G |
Giant slalom | Slalom | Combined

The Men's slalom World Cup 1993/1994 consisted of 8 events.

== Final point standings ==
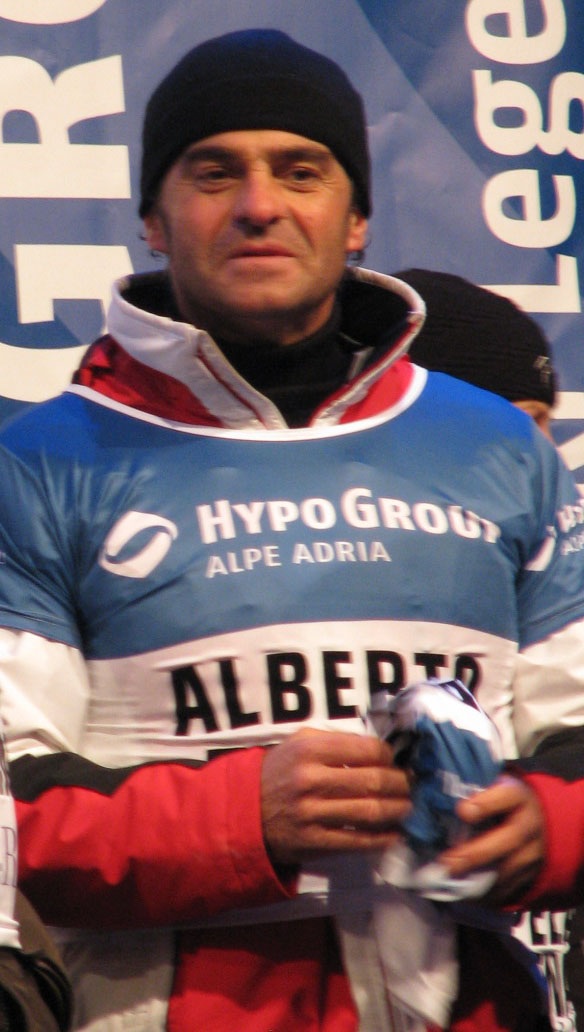
Alberto Tomba the Cup's winner.

In men's slalom World Cup 1993/94 all results count. Alberto Tomba won his third Slalom World Cup.

Place	Name	Country	Total points	3 (United States)	4 (Canada)	7 (Italy)	11 (Italy)	16 (Slovenia)	19 (Austria)	25 (France)	27 (Germany)
1	Alberto Tomba	Italy	540	-	100	100	80	-	60	100	100
2	Thomas Stangassinger	Austria	452	100	80	80	45	-	100	18	29
3	Jure Košir	Slovenia	421	80	60	32	100	-	29	60	60
4	Finn Christian Jagge	Norway	389	60	50	50	60	100	24	45	-
5	Thomas Fogdö	Sweden	352	-	32	-	50	60	50	80	80
6	Bernhard Gstrein	Austria	268	50	40	45	-	26	45	22	40
	Thomas Sykora	Austria	268	-	36	-	15	45	80	60	32
8	Peter Roth	Germany	248	22	24	40	10	50	16	36	50
9	Kjetil André Aamodt	Norway	215	40	45	36	26	40	18	10	-
10	Ole Kristian Furuseth	Norway	211	7	-	60	32	80	32	-	-
11	Günther Mader	Austria	176	45	26	26	29	20	6	-	24
12	Dietmar Thöni	Austria	126	24	20	20	13	29	20	-	-
13	Patrick Staub	Switzerland	124	15	-	22	22	16	36	13	-
14	Armin Bittner	Germany	119	-	16	24	5	-	-	29	45
15	Lasse Kjus	Norway	118	29	15	15	-	-	12	11	36
16	Gregor Grilc	Slovenia	113	-	-	8	40	32	11	-	22
17	Andrea Zinsli	Switzerland	109	-	-	18	16	18	15	26	16
18	Siegfried Voglreiter	Austria	106	-	14	14	8	-	40	12	18
19	Bernhard Bauer	Germany	100	26	29	-	-	15	5	16	9
20	Michael von Grünigen	Switzerland	90	5	-	29	-	36	-	20	-
21	Yves Dimier	France	85	18	18	11	-	-	-	32	6
22	Sébastien Amiez	France	80	-	-	-	11	14	-	40	15
23	Angelo Weiss	Italy	72	16	8	-	40	-	-	-	8
24	Kiminobu Kimura	Japan	69	-	11	7	14	11	8	7	11
25	Oliver Künzi	Switzerland	68	-	9	-	9	22	14	-	14
26	Michael Tritscher	Austria	66	-	-	-	24	-	22	-	20
27	Fabio De Crignis	Italy	65	36	13	16	-	-	-	-	-
28	Paul Accola	Switzerland	55	14	-	12	-	24	-	-	5
29	Marc Girardelli	Luxembourg	54	-	22	-	20	-	-	-	12
30	Fabrizio Tescari	Italy	46	-	-	-	20	-	-	-	26
31	Konrad Ladstätter	Italy	45	8	-	10	7	10	4	6	-
32	Rob Crossan	Canada	41	32	-	-	-	8	1	-	-
	Mitja Kunc	Slovenia	41	10	-	-	-	-	-	24	7
34	Takuya Ishioka	Japan	39	-	-	-	-	12	9	8	10
35	Christian Mayer	Austria	37	6	10	-	12	9	-	-	-
36	Matthew Grosjean	United States	33	20	-	13	-	-	-	-	-
37	François Simond	France	29	-	-	9	-	13	7	-	-
38	Andrej Miklavc	Slovenia	27	-	-	-	-	-	-	14	13
39	Alois Vogl	Germany	26	-	-	-	-	-	26	-	-
40	Niklas Nilsson	Sweden	24	12	-	-	6	6	-	-	-
41	Casey Puckett	United States	15	-	-	-	-	-	-	15	-
42	Mats Ericson	Sweden	14	-	-	4	-	-	10	-	-
43	Erik Schlopy	United States	13	13	-	-	-	-	-	-	-
	Hubert Strolz	Austria	13	-	-	-	-	-	13	-	-
	Carlo Gerosa	Italy	13	9	-	-	-	-	-	-	4
46	Markus Eberle	Germany	12	-	12	-	-	-	-	-	-
47	Mario Reiter	Austria	12	-	-	-	-	-	3	9	-
48	Thomas Grandi	Canada	11	11	-	-	-	-	-	-	-
49	Roger Pramotton	Italy	8	-	-	6	-	-	-	-	2
50	Heinz Peter Platter	Italy	7	-	7	-	-	-	-	-	-
	Christian Polig	Italy	7	-	-	-	-	7	-	-	-
52	Patrice Bianchi	France	5	-	-	5	-	-	-	-	-
	Eric Villiard	Canada	5	-	-	-	-	-	-	5	-
54	Willy Raine	Canada	3	-	-	-	-	-	3	-	-
	Norman Bergamelli	Italy	3	-	-	-	-	-	-	-	3

== See also ==
- 1994 Alpine Skiing World Cup – Men's slalom
