= 1993 Alpine Skiing World Cup – Men's slalom =

1993 Men's slalom World Cup
Previous: 1992	Next: 1994

Men's slalom World Cup 1992/1993

== Final point standings ==
In men's slalom World Cup 1992/93 all results count.

Place	Name	Country	Total points	2 (Italy)	4 (France)	8 (Italy)	9 (Slovenia)	12 (Germany)	18 (Austria)	22 (Switzerland)	34 (Sweden)
1	Thomas Fogdö	Sweden	545	-	100	40	100	45	100	60	100
2	Alberto Tomba	Italy	436	-	36	80	80	100	60	80	-
3	Thomas Stangassinger	Austria	362	24	-	24	24	80	50	100	60
4	Bernhard Gstrein	Austria	276	22	26	32	16	40	50	40	50
5	Kjetil André Aamodt	Norway	267	-	11	-	15	80	36	45	80
6	Jure Košir	Slovenia	251	12	16	29	32	32	80	50	-
7	Thomas Sykora	Austria	238	29	80	60	-	29	-	-	40
8	Peter Roth	Germany	202	-	-	16	60	50	40	36	-
9	Patrick Staub	Switzerland	196	-	24	50	45	18	10	20	29
10	Armin Bittner	Germany	185	60	50	-	-	24	-	15	36
11	Oliver Künzi	Switzerland	179	15	45	45	-	8	24	18	24
12	Hubert Strolz	Austria	172	60	60	-	-	20	32	-	-
13	Marc Girardelli	Luxembourg	160	45	-	11	20	36	22	26	-
14	Michael Tritscher	Austria	149	80	-	-	40	-	-	29	-
15	Patrice Bianchi	France	140	40	-	100	-	-	-	-	-
16	Fabrizio Tescari	Italy	113	100	6	-	-	7	-	-	-
17	Mats Ericson	Sweden	111	-	-	22	50	-	26	13	-
18	Günther Mader	Austria	101	-	18	-	14	11	-	32	26
19	Lasse Kjus	Norway	96	-	13	36	-	15	-	-	32
20	Finn Christian Jagge	Norway	90	-	22	18	-	26	-	24	-
21	Dietmar Thöni	Austria	89	16	32	-	-	13	12	16	-
22	Ole Kristian Furuseth	Norway	88	-	-	26	18	22	-	22	-
23	Paul Accola	Switzerland	79	-	20	14	-	-	-	-	45
24	Michael von Grünigen	Switzerland	77	26	-	20	-	9	15	7	-
25	Konrad Ladstätter	Italy	75	14	-	15	-	16	20	10	-
26	Carlo Gerosa	Italy	68	-	29	-	26	-	13	-	-
27	Didrik Marksten	Norway	63	18	8	-	29	-	8	-	-
28	Niklas Nilsson	Sweden	55	-	-	12	13	-	14	-	16
29	Siegfried Voglreiter	Austria	53	13	40	-	-	-	-	-	-
30	Fabio De Crignis	Italy	50	36	-	-	-	-	-	14	-
31	Bernhard Bauer	Germany	43	-	-	-	-	14	29	-	-
32	Matthew Grosjean	United States	42	-	-	-	-	12	18	12	-
33	Johan Wallner	Sweden	36	-	-	-	36	-	-	-	-
34	Steve Locher	Switzerland	35	9	15	-	-	-	-	11	-
	Christian Mayer	Austria	35	11	-	-	-	-	16	8	-
	Rob Crossan	Canada	35	-	-	6	-	-	9	-	20
37	Roger Pramotton	Italy	32	32	-	-	-	-	-	-	-
38	Richard Pramotton	Italy	30	20	10	-	-	-	-	-	-
	Markus Eberle	Germany	30	-	14	10	-	-	-	6	-
40	Gregor Grilc	Slovenia	29	-	7	-	22	-	-	-	-
41	Andrej Miklavc	Slovenia	22	-	9	13	-	-	-	-	-
	Tetsuya Okabe	Japan	22	-	-	-	-	-	-	-	22
43	François Simond	France	20	10	-	-	10	-	-	-	-
44	Didier Schmidt	France	18	-	-	7	-	-	11	-	-
	Markus Wasmeier	Germany	18	-	-	-	-	-	-	-	18
46	Espen Hellerud	Norway	17	-	-	-	11	6	-	-	-
47	Christian Polig	Italy	14	-	-	-	-	5	-	9	-
48	Takuya Ishioka	Japan	12	-	12	-	-	-	-	-	-
	Hans Pieren	Switzerland	12	-	-	-	12	-	-	-	-
50	Yves Dimier	France	10	-	-	-	-	10	-	-	-
51	Harald Strand Nilsen	Norway	9	-	-	9	-	-	-	-	-
52	Angelo Weiss	Italy	8	8	-	-	-	-	-	-	-
	Heinz Peter Platter	Italy	8	-	-	8	-	-	-	-	-
54	Mika Marila	Finland	7	7	-	-	-	-	-	-	-

Note:

In the last race only the best racers were allowed to compete and only the best 15 finishers were awarded with points.

Alpine Skiing World Cup
Men

Overall | Downhill | Super G | Giant slalom | Slalom | Combined

1993
