= 1994 Alpine Skiing World Cup – Men's giant slalom =

1994 Men's giant slalom World Cup
Previous: 1993	Next: 1995

Men's giant slalom World Cup 1993/1994

== Final point standings ==
In men's giant slalom World Cup 1993/94 all results count. Christian Mayer won the cup with only one race win.

Place	Name	Country	Total points	1 (Austria)	2 (United States)	6 (France)	10 (Italy)	15 (Slovenia)	17 (Austria)	21 (Switzerland)	30 (United States)	35 (United States)
1	Christian Mayer	Austria	496	-	26	100	60	50	80	20	80	80
2	Kjetil André Aamodt	Norway	494	60	60	36	32	29	100	45	32	100
3	Franck Piccard	France	414	100	50	50	45	11	29	29	50	50
4	Fredrik Nyberg	Sweden	384	80	-	16	40	100	26	22	100	-
5	Steve Locher	Switzerland	356	26	45	26	100	32	15	36	16	60
6	Michael von Grünigen	Switzerland	351	40	40	60	36	36	50	18	26	45
7	Tobias Barnerssoi	Germany	308	16	29	80	26	60	32	10	29	26
8	Günther Mader	Austria	295	45	100	-	50	45	-	26	-	29
9	Matteo Belfrond	Italy	293	36	22	18	18	80	11	8	60	40
10	Jan Einar Thorsen	Norway	291	12	20	45	22	16	20	100	24	32
11	Alberto Tomba	Italy	282	-	80	14	80	-	-	50	40	18
12	Mitja Kunc	Slovenia	209	-	-	10	29	45	40	80	5	-
13	Bernhard Gstrein	Austria	204	32	9	29	24	12	22	40	-	36
14	Rainer Salzgeber	Austria	169	29	-	20	-	24	18	60	18	-
15	Gerhard Königsrainer	Italy	163	-	24	32	-	26	9	14	36	22
16	Achim Vogt	Liechtenstein	135	10	32	-	15	22	45	-	11	-
17	Markus Wasmeier	Germany	133	6	36	22	-	7	24	-	22	16
18	Richard Kröll	Austria	123	22	15	24	-	2	60	-	-	-
19	Marc Girardelli	Luxembourg	122	50	10	-	20	10	-	32	-	-
20	Urs Kälin	Switzerland	110	-	-	-	13	-	36	16	45	-
21	Lasse Kjus	Norway	76	-	8	-	-	20	-	24	-	24
22	Hans Knauß	Austria	73	-	18	40	-	-	-	-	15	-
23	Ian Piccard	France	62	13	6	7	-	9	-	13	14	-
	Jure Košir	Slovenia	62	-	5	-	9	18	14	4	12	-
25	Johan Wallner	Sweden	57	-	14	5	12	13	13	-	-	-
26	Ole Kristian Furuseth	Norway	53	-	3	10	16	6	8	2	8	-
27	Thomas Grandi	Canada	50	-	4	11	-	8	7	-	-	20
28	Hubert Strolz	Austria	48	18	16	-	-	-	-	7	7	-
	Luca Pesando	Italy	48	15	13	15	-	-	4	1	-	-
30	Helmut Mayer	Austria	45	24	-	13	8	-	-	-	-	-
31	Norman Bergamelli	Italy	39	-	-	-	11	14	-	-	14	-
32	Mario Reiter	Austria	37	-	-	-	10	15	12	-	-	-
33	Marco Hangl	Switzerland	32	-	12	-	-	-	5	15	-	-
	Massimo Zucchelli	Italy	32	4	-	8	6	5	-	9	-	-
35	Ivan Bormolini	Italy	31	20	-	-	-	1	10	-	-	-
36	Harald Strand Nilsen	Norway	28	-	-	12	-	-	16	-	-	-
37	Paul Accola	Switzerland	27	11	-	6	-	-	-	-	10	-
38	Alain Feutrier	France	26	-	-	3	14	-	-	-	9	-
39	Siegfried Voglreiter	Austria	25	14	11	-	-	-	-	-	-	-
40	Jeremy Nobis	United States	23	-	-	-	-	-	-	3	20	-
41	Marcel Sulliger	Switzerland	22	7	7	-	-	4	-	-	4	-
42	Didrik Marksten	Norway	18	-	-	-	-	-	6	12	-	-
43	Martin Knöri	Switzerland	11	-	-	-	-	-	-	11	-	-
44	Gregor Grilc	Slovenia	10	-	-	-	7	3	-	-	-	-
45	Peter Roth	Germany	9	9	-	-	-	-	-	-	-	-
46	Roberto Spampatti	Italy	8	8	-	-	-	-	-	-	-	-
47	Josef Polig	Italy	6	-	2	4	-	-	-	-	-	-
	Patrick Wirth	Austria	6	-	-	-	-	-	-	6	-	-
	Thomas Sykora	Austria	6	-	-	-	-	-	-	-	6	-
50	Tobias Hellman	Sweden	5	5	-	-	-	-	-	-	-	-
	Patrick Staub	Switzerland	5	-	-	-	-	-	-	5	-	-
52	Mads Mørch	Norway	3	-	-	-	-	-	3	-	-	-
53	Armand Schiele	France	2	-	-	2	-	-	-	-	-	-

Note:

In the last race only the best racers were allowed to compete and only the best 15 finishers were awarded with points.

Alpine Skiing World Cup
Men

Overall | Downhill | Super G | Giant slalom | Slalom | Combined

1994
