= 1995 Alpine Skiing World Cup – Men's giant slalom =

1995 Men's giant slalom World Cup
Previous: 1994	Next: 1996

Men's giant slalom World Cup 1994/1995

== Calendar ==
Round	Race No	Place	Country	Date	Winner	Second	Third
1	1	Tignes	France	December 3, 1994	(Liechtenstein) Achim Vogt	(Switzerland) Michael von Grünigen	(Norway) Kjetil André Aamodt
2	7	Val d'Isère	France	December 18, 1994	(Switzerland) Michael von Grünigen	(Norway) Kjetil André Aamodt	(Austria) Günther Mader
3	10	Alta Badia	Italy	December 22, 1994	(Italy) Alberto Tomba	(Switzerland) Urs Kälin	(Austria) Christian Mayer
4	11	Kranjska Gora	Slovenia	January 6, 1995	(Italy) Alberto Tomba	(Norway) H. Strand Nilsen (Slovenia) Mitja Kunc
5	22	Adelboden	Switzerland	February 4, 1995	(Italy) Alberto Tomba	(Slovenia) Jure Košir	(Norway) H. Strand Nilsen
6	24	Furano	Japan	February 20, 1995	(Austria) Mario Reiter	(Slovenia) Jure Košir	(Norway) H. Strand Nilsen
7	31	Bormio	Italy	March 18, 1995	(Italy) Alberto Tomba	(Austria) Günther Mader	(Austria) Rainer Salzgeber

== Final point standings ==
In men's giant slalom World Cup 1994/95 all results count.

Place	Name	Country	Total points	1 (France)	7 (France)	10 (Italy)	11 (Slovenia)	22 (Switzerland)	24 (Japan)	31 (Italy)
1	Alberto Tomba	Italy	450	50	-	100	100	100	-	100
2	Jure Košir	Slovenia	355	40	36	29	50	80	80	40
3	Harald Strand Nilsen	Norway	322	24	29	45	80	60	60	24
4	Kjetil André Aamodt	Norway	307	60	80	50	-	22	45	50
5	Michael von Grünigen	Switzerland	296	80	100	-	22	32	36	26
6	Urs Kälin	Switzerland	288	45	50	80	40	29	24	20
7	Achim Vogt	Liechtenstein	226	100	24	8	26	36	32	-
8	Mario Reiter	Austria	218	36	-	10	36	14	100	22
9	Günther Mader	Austria	212	26	60	14	20	12	-	80
	Lasse Kjus	Norway	212	-	50	36	-	40	50	36
11	Rainer Salzgeber	Austria	203	36	-	7	45	26	29	60
12	Richard Kröll	Austria	161	16	15	15	-	50	20	45
13	Ian Piccard	France	130	-	26	32	24	18	14	16
14	Christian Mayer	Austria	125	29	20	60	-	16	-	-
15	Steve Locher	Switzerland	118	-	40	-	14	24	40	-
16	Fredrik Nyberg	Sweden	106	-	-	20	7	45	16	18
17	Mitja Kunc	Slovenia	102	9	9	-	80	4	-	-
18	Marc Girardelli	Luxembourg	91	-	20	40	18	13	-	-
19	Tobias Barnerssoi	Germany	85	22	32	-	12	8	11	-
20	Paul Accola	Switzerland	83	14	11	26	32	-	-	-
21	Franck Piccard	France	69	13	13	-	8	20	15	-
22	Ole Kristian Furuseth	Norway	65	8	-	9	16	10	22	-
23	Are Torpe	Norway	63	-	-	16	29	-	18	-
24	Marco Hangl	Switzerland	60	18	16	-	-	-	26	-
25	Bernhard Gstrein	Austria	57	11	3	24	11	-	8	-
26	Johan Wallner	Sweden	50	12	14	24	-	-	-	-
27	Ivan Bormolini	Italy	48	-	-	13	13	9	13	-
28	Massimo Zucchelli	Italy	37	15	22	-	-	-	-	-
29	Christophe Saioni	France	34	-	10	-	9	15	-	-
30	Michael Tritscher	Austria	32	-	-	-	-	-	-	32
31	Marcel Sulliger	Switzerland	31	-	-	12	-	7	12	-
32	Kristian Ghedina	Italy	29	-	-	-	-	-	-	29
33	Jeremy Nobis	United States	26	20	-	6	-	-	-	-
	Luca Pesando	Italy	26	-	12	11	-	3	-	-
35	Gerhard Königsrainer	Italy	24	-	-	-	15	-	9	-
	Alois Vogl	Germany	24	-	-	18	-	-	6	-
37	Norman Bergamelli	Italy	20	-	7	3	5	5	-	-
38	Yves Dimier	France	16	-	5	-	-	11	-	-
39	Thomas Grandi	Canada	14	-	-	4	10	-	-	-
40	Matteo Belfrond	Italy	13	7	-	-	6	-	-	-
41	Josef Polig	Italy	10	10	-	-	-	-	-	-
	Sergio Bergamelli	Italy	10	-	-	-	-	-	10	-
43	Hans Knauß	Austria	8	-	8	-	-	-	-	-
44	Chris Puckett	United States	7	-	-	-	-	-	7	-
45	Jernej Koblar	Slovenia	6	-	6	-	-	-	-	-
	Andreas Schifferer	Austria	6	-	-	-	-	6	-	-
47	Andrej Miklavc	Slovenia	5	-	-	5	-	-	-	-
	Patrice Manuel	France	5	-	-	-	-	-	5	-
49	Yvan Eggenberger	Switzerland	4	-	4	-	-	-	-	-
	Andreas Ertl	Germany	4	-	-	-	-	-	4	-

Note:

In the last race only the best racers were allowed to compete and only the best 15 finishers were awarded with points.
