= 1993 Alpine Skiing World Cup – Men's giant slalom =

1993 Men's giant slalom World Cup
Previous: 1992	Next: 1994

Men's giant slalom World Cup 1992/1993

== Final point standings ==
In men's giant slalom World Cup 1992/93 all results count.

Place	Name	Country	Total points	1 (Italy)	7 (Italy)	10 (Slovenia)	20 (Switzerland)	31 (Norway)	33 (Sweden)
1	Kjetil André Aamodt	Norway	410	100	20	50	40	100	100
2	Alberto Tomba	Italy	381	80	60	36	80	45	80
3	Marc Girardelli	Luxembourg	372	12	100	100	50	50	60
4	Lasse Kjus	Norway	254	40	9	80	60	20	45
5	Fredrik Nyberg	Sweden	250	22	40	60	18	60	50
6	Michael von Grünigen	Switzerland	236	11	45	26	100	22	32
7	Johan Wallner	Sweden	208	60	26	18	24	80	-
8	Paul Accola	Switzerland	168	36	50	13	-	40	29
9	Alain Feutrier	France	148	-	80	-	-	32	36
10	Hans Pieren	Switzerland	143	24	32	20	45	-	22
11	Sergio Bergamelli	Italy	125	20	24	45	36	-	-
12	Steve Locher	Switzerland	124	32	36	-	14	16	26
13	Franck Piccard	France	119	-	13	11	26	29	40
	Tobias Barnerssoi	Germany	119	50	8	22	-	15	24
15	Richard Kröll	Austria	111	45	-	16	16	18	16
16	Ole Kristian Furuseth	Norway	70	-	22	-	12	36	-
17	Rainer Salzgeber	Austria	65	-	29	4	32	-	-
18	Didrik Marksten	Norway	64	29	16	10	-	9	-
19	Ian Piccard	France	59	-	-	40	9	10	-
20	Urs Kälin	Switzerland	56	9	15	8	-	24	-
21	Hans Knauß	Austria	46	3	11	-	6	26	-
22	Mitja Kunc	Slovenia	43	-	11	32	-	-	-
23	Massimo Zucchelli	Italy	41	16	-	-	-	5	20
24	Alberto Senigagliesi	Italy	40	-	14	26	-	-	-
	Matteo Belfrond	Italy	40	26	-	14	-	-	-
26	Roberto Spampatti	Italy	39	10	-	29	-	-	-
27	Hubert Strolz	Austria	32	-	12	-	20	-	36
28	Peter Roth	Germany	31	15	4	12	-	-	-
	Helmut Mayer	Austria	31	-	-	5	15	11	-
30	Josef Polig	Italy	30	18	5	-	7	-	-
	Christian Mayer	Austria	30	-	18	6	-	6	-
32	Jeremy Nobis	United States	29	-	-	-	29	-	-
33	Günther Mader	Austria	26	-	-	-	24	2	-
34	Jure Košir	Slovenia	25	-	-	15	10	-	-
35	Siegfried Voglreiter	Austria	21	8	-	-	13	-	-
	Markus Wasmeier	Germany	21	-	-	3	-	-	18
37	Marcel Sulliger	Switzerland	17	-	-	-	3	14	-
	Tom Stiansen	Norway	17	13	-	-	-	4	-
	Patrick Holzer	Italy	17	14	-	-	-	3	-
40	Stéphane Cretin	France	15	-	6	9	-	-	-
41	Thomas Grandi	Canada	13	-	-	-	-	13	-
42	Stephan Eberharter	Austria	12	-	7	-	5	-	-
	Gerhard Königsrainer	Italy	12	-	-	-	-	12	-
44	Marco Hangl	Switzerland	11	-	-	-	11	-	-
45	Patrick Staub	Switzerland	10	-	-	2	8	-	-
46	Stéphane Exartier	France	9	6	3	-	-	-	-
	Michel Lucatelli	France	9	-	-	7	2	-	-
48	Luca Pesando	Italy	8	-	-	-	-	8	-
	Richard Pramotton	Italy	8	-	-	1	-	7	-
50	Adrien Duvillard	France	7	7	-	-	-	-	-
51	Franck Carmagnolle	France	5	5	-	-	-	-	-
52	Günther Marxer	Liechtenstein	4	4	-	-	-	-	-
	Oliver Künzi	Switzerland	4	-	-	-	4	-	-
54	Jan Einar Thorsen	Norway	2	-	2	-	-	-	-

Note:

In the last race only the best racers were allowed to compete and only the best 15 finishers were awarded with points.

Alpine Skiing World Cup
Men

Overall | Downhill | Super G | Giant slalom | Slalom | Combined

1993
