= 1995 Alpine Skiing World Cup – Men's combined =

1995 Men's combined World Cu
Previous: 1994	Next: 1996

Men's combined World Cup 1994/1995

== Calendar ==
Round	Race No	Discipline	Place	Country	Date	Winner	Second	Third
1	16	Downhill; Slalom	Kitzbühel	Austria	January 13 or 14 1995; January 15, 1995	(Luxembourg) Marc Girardelli	(Norway) H. Strand Nilsen	(Austria) Günther Mader
2	21	Downhill; Slalom	Wengen	Switzerland	January 20 or 21 1995; January 22, 1995	(Luxembourg) Marc Girardelli	(Norway) Lasse Kjus	(Norway) H. Strand Nilsen

== Final point standings ==
In men's combined World Cup 1994/95 both results count.

Place	Name	Country	Total points	16 (Austria)	21 (Switzerland)
1	Marc Girardelli	Luxembourg	200	100	100
2	Harald Christian Strand Nilsen	Norway	140	80	60
3	Lasse Kjus	Norway	125	45	80
4	Kjetil André Aamodt	Norway	100	50	50
5	Espen Hellerud	Norway	72	40	32
6	Günther Mader	Austria	60	60	-
	Jean-Luc Crétier	France	60	36	24
8	Atle Skårdal	Norway	45	-	45
9	Paul Accola	Switzerland	40	-	40
10	Ed Podivinsky	Canada	36	-	36
11	Luc Alphand	France	29	-	29
12	Tommy Moe	United States	26	-	26
13	Gaetan Llorach	France	22	-	22
14	Roman Torn	Canada	20	-	20
15	A. J. Kitt	United States	18	-	18
16	Kristian Ghedina	Italy	16	-	16

Note:

In both races not all points were awarded (not enough finishers/competitors).

== Men's combined team results ==
bold indicate highest score - italics indicate race wins

Place	Country	Total points	16 (Austria)	21 (Switzerland)	Racers	Wins
1	Norway	482	215	**267**	5	0
2	Luxembourg	200	100	100	1	2
3	France	111	36	75	3	0
4	Austria	60	60	-	1	0
5	Canada	56	-	56	2	0
6	United States	44	-	44	2	0
6	Switzerland	40	-	40	1	0
7	Italy	16	-	16	1	0

**Alpine Skiing World Cup**
**Men**

Overall | Downhill | Super G | Giant slalom | Slalom | **Combined**

**1995**
