= 1994 Alpine Skiing World Cup – Men's combined =

1994 Men's combined World Cup
Previous: 1993	Next: 1995

Men's combined World Cup 1993/1994

== Final point standings ==
In men's combined World Cup 1993/94 both results count.

Place	Name	Country	Total points	20 (Austria)	26 (France)
1	Kjetil André Aamodt	Norway	180	80	100
	Lasse Kjus	Norway	180	100	80
3	Harald Christian Strand Nilsen	Norway	105	45	60
4	Tommy Moe	United States	100	50	50
5	Günther Mader	Austria	82	60	22
6	Marcel Sulliger	Switzerland	72	40	32
7	Kristian Ghedina	Italy	52	32	20
8	Ed Podivinsky	Canada	45	-	45
9	Atle Skårdal	Norway	40	-	40
10	Janne Leskinen	Finland	36	36	-
	Steve Locher	Switzerland	36	-	36
12	Roman Torn	Canada	29	29	-
	Lasse Arnesen	Norway	29	-	29
14	Willy Raine	Canada	26	-	26
15	Markus Wasmeier	Germany	24	-	24
16	Craig Thrasher	United States	18	-	18

Note:

In all competitions not all points were awarded (not enough finishers).

Alpine Skiing World Cup
Men

Overall | Downhill | Super G | Giant slalom | Slalom | Combined

1994
