= Heinz Hämmerle =

Heinz Hämmerle, sometimes written as Heinz Hammerle, is an Austrian alpine ski technician known for his work with Lindsey Vonn as part of Vonn Tech, who also calls him Magic Heinzi. Techs are responsible for the ongoing tuning of the skis to ensure success.

== Early life ==
Hämmerle is from Lustenau, Austria, and was a ski racer in childhood.

== Career ==
Prior to his work with Vonn, the first female skier he worked with, he was a technician for Armin Assinger, Bode Miller, Patrick Ortlieb, Hans Olsson, Leonhard Stock and Hannes Trinkl. He worked at the Olympics from 1980 through 2018 and retired in 2024 after Vonn first retired from competitive skiing. They were paired when Vonn transferred from Rossignol to Head, and together, Vonn and Hammerle won 3 Olympic and 50 World Cup races. An injury prevented him from joining her in coming out of retirement.
