= Alpine skiing at the 1998 Winter Olympics – Men's combined =

Men's combined at the XVIII Olympic Winter Games
- Alpine skiing
- Venue: Hakuba
- Date: February 9–13, 1998
- Competitors: 38 from 21 nations
- Winning time: 3:08.06

Medalists
1st place, gold medalist(s)		Mario Reiter	Austria
2nd place, silver medalist(s)		Lasse Kjus	Norway
3rd place, bronze medalist(s)		Christian Mayer	Austria

The Men's combined competition of the Nagano 1998 Olympics was held at Hakuba. The downhill was originally scheduled before the slalom runs, but weather delays meant that the slalom runs were run first.

The defending world champion was Kjetil André Aamodt of Norway, who was also the defending World Cup combined champion.

== Results ==
Rank	Name	Country	Slalom 1	Slalom 2	Downhill	Total	Difference
1st place, gold medalist(s)	Mario Reiter	Austria	0:47.37	0:44.48	1:36.21	3:08.06	-
2nd place, silver medalist(s)	Lasse Kjus	Norway	0:48.09	0:45.57	1:34.99	3:08.65	+0.59
3rd place, bronze medalist(s)	Christian Mayer	Austria	0:49.30	0:45.75	1:35.06	3:10.11	+2.05
4	Günther Mader	Austria	0:49.19	0:46.17	1:34.83	3:10.19	+2.13
5	Andrzej Bachleda-Curuś	Poland	0:49.02	0:45.47	1:37.04	3:11.53	+3.47
6	Alessandro Fattori	Italy	0:55.45	0:45.26	1:36.29	3:17.00	+8.94
7	Aleš Brezavšček	Slovenia	0:55.33	0:48.82	1:35.94	3:20.09	+12.03
8	Peter Pen	Slovenia	0:54.21	0:49.62	1:36.98	3:20.81	+12.75
9	Jürgen Hasler	Liechtenstein	0:54.39	0:50.88	1:37.88	3:23.15	+15.09
10	Erik Seletto	Italy	0:56.30	0:51.16	1:35.77	3:23.23	+15.17
11	Thomás Grob	Chile	0:56.51	0:51.41	1:40.68	3:28.60	+20.54
12	Mykola Skriabin	Ukraine	0:55.18	0:51.99	1:43.08	3:30.25	+22.19
13	Rainer Grob	Chile	0:58.50	0:54.63	1:41.36	3:34.49	+26.43
14	Zurab Dzhidzhishvili	Georgia	1:00.20	0:55.06	1:40.39	3:35.65	+27.59
15	Patrick-Paul Schwarzacher-Joyce	Ireland	1:00.11	0:56.11	1:42.81	3:39.03	+30.97
-	Finn Christian Jagge	Norway	0:50.22	0:45.16	DNS	-	-
-	Hermann Maier	Austria	0:50.37	0:45.53	DNS	-	-
-	Kjetil André Aamodt	Norway	0:50.29	0:44.97	DNF	-	-
-	Kristian Ghedina	Italy	0:51.58	0:48.77	DNS	-	-
-	Luca Cattaneo	Italy	0:53.59	0:49.93	DNS	-	-
-	Marcel Maxa	Czech Republic	0:49.73	0:46.44	DQ	-	-
-	Ed Podivinsky	Canada	0:51.48	DNF	-	-	-
-	Linas Vaitkus	Lithuania	0:58.93	DNF	-	-	-
-	Matt Grosjean	United States	0:48.32	DNF	-	-	-
-	Paul Accola	Switzerland	0:49.39	DNF	-	-	-
-	Petar Dichev	Bulgaria	0:51.16	DQ	-	-	-
-	Jernej Koblar	Slovenia	DNF	-	-	-	-
-	Kalle Palander	Finland	DNF	-	-	-	-
-	Bruno Kernen	Switzerland	DNF	-	-	-	-
-	James Ormond	Great Britain	DNF	-	-	-	-
-	Jürg Grünenfelder	Switzerland	DNF	-	-	-	-
-	Arne Hardenberg	Denmark	DNF	-	-	-	-
-	Patrik Järbyn	Sweden	DNF	-	-	-	-
-	Tejs Broberg	Denmark	DNF	-	-	-	-
-	Jason Rosener	United States	DNF	-	-	-	-
-	Yasuyuki Takishita	Japan	DNF	-	-	-	-
-	Andrew Freshwater	Great Britain	DNF	-	-	-	-
-	Chad Fleischer	United States	DNF	-	-	-	-
