= Åne Sæter =

Norwegian alpine skier (born 1975)

Åne Sæter (born 1975) is a retired Norwegian alpine skier.

Competing at the 1993 and 1994 Junior World Championships, he finished 5th in both the giant slalom and combined races at the 1994 edition.

He made his World Cup debut in December 1995 in Val d'Isere. He collected his first World Cup points with a 23rd place in a January 1996 giant slalom in Flachau. Shortly after he improved to an 8th place in Veysonnaz. Later struggling with finishing in many of the races, his last World Cup outing came in March 2001 in Kvitfjell.

He represented the sports club Oppdal IL from Oppdal Municipality.
