= Are Torpe =

Norwegian alpine skier (born 1973)

Are Torpe (born 1973) is a retired Norwegian alpine skier.

He competed in three events at the 1991 Junior World Championships, and then three events at the 1992 Junior World Championships. His best placement was 21st in the 1992 slalom.

He made his World Cup debut in December 1994 in Tignes, and competed on the World Cup circuit until 2001. He collected his first World Cup points with a 15th place in December 1994 in Alta Badia, and soon improved to 9th place in January 1995 in Kranjska Gora.

He hails from Øystese and represented the club Øystese.
