= Heinz Peter Platter =

Italian alpine skier (born 1967)

Personal information
- Born: 8 March 1967 (age 59) Prad am Stilfser Joch, Italy

Skiing career
- Sport: Alpine skiing
- Retired: 1994
- Disciplines: Technical events
- World Cup debut: 1990

World Cup
- Seasons: 4

Heinz Peter Platter (born 8 March 1967) is an Italian former alpine skier.

== Biography ==
At the end of his sporting career he became technical manager of the Swedish Alpine skiing national team. He was later hired by China to try to bring her to the 2022 Winter Olympics.
