= Mats Ericson =

Swedish alpine skier (born 1964)

Mats Ericson (born 20 September 1964 in Järfälla Municipality) is a Swedish former alpine skier who competed in the 1992 Winter Olympics and 1994 Winter Olympics.
