= Markus Herrmann =

Swiss alpine skier (born 1972)

Markus Herrmann (born 1972) is a retired Swiss alpine skier.

He competed in two events at the 1990 Junior World Championships and all five events at the 1991 Junior World Championships, his best placement being the 8th place in the 1991 downhill event. Herrmann also competed in the World Championships of 1996, 1997 and 1999, recording one 14 place and two 20th places.

He made his World Cup debut in January 1993 in Veysonnaz. He collected his first World Cup points with a 10th place in the January 1995 Kitzbühel downhill, and then managed a 5th place in the December 1995 Gröden downhill. After that, his best placements were five 8th places in downhill and combined. A prolific World Cup competitor, his last World Cup outing came in January 2003 in Kitzbühel.

He represented the sports club in Schönried.
