= Bernhard Bauer (skier) =

German alpine skier (born 1967)

Bernhard Bauer (born 10 October 1967 in Oberwössen) is a retired German alpine skier who competed in the 1994 Winter Olympics.
