= Luke Sauder =

Canadian Olympic alpine skier (born 1970)

Luke Sauder (born 13 September 1970) is a Canadian former alpine skier who competed in the 1994 Winter Olympics and 1998 Winter Olympics. He was inducted into the Cambridge (ON) Sports Hall of Fame in 2007.
