= Armand Schiele =

French alpine skier (born 1967)

Armand Schiele (born 7 June 1967 in Colmar) is a French former alpine skier. He competed in the men's super-G at the 1992 Winter Olympics.
