= Massimo Zucchelli =

Italian alpine skier (born 1972)

Massimo Zucchelli (born 1972) is a retired Italian alpine skier.

He competed in three events at the 1991 Junior World Championships, winning the gold medal in the giant slalom. Later, in the World Cup, Zucchelli would compete in the giant slalom exclusively.

He made his World Cup debut in November 1992 in Sestriere, also collecting his first World Cup points with a 15th-place finish. Near the end of the season he improved to 13th in Åre. In the 1993-94 FIS Alpine Ski World Cup, he stabilized himself in the top 30, and at the onset of the 1994-95 season he improved his best placement to 12th, achieved in Val d'Isere. For the remainder of his World Cup career until January 1997, he either finished in the 20s or was disqualified.
