= François Simond =

French alpine skier (born 1969)

François Simond (born 27 September 1969) is a French former alpine skier who competed at the 1992 and 1998 Winter Olympics.
