= Brian Stemmle =

Canadian retired skier (born 1966)

Personal information
- Born: October 12, 1966 (age 59) Aurora, Ontario, Canada

Skiing career
- Sport: Alpine skiing
- Club: Georgian Peaks Ski Club
- Retired: July 1999 (age 32)
- Disciplines: Downhill, Super-G
- World Cup debut: 1985 (age 18)

Olympics
- Teams: 4 – (1988–1998)
- Medals: 0

World Championships
- Teams: 3 – (1996–1999)
- Medals: 0

World Cup
- Seasons: 15
- Wins: 0
- Podiums: 3 – (2 DH, 1 SG)
- Overall titles: 0 – (33rd in 1996)
- Discipline titles: 0 – (10th in DH, 1996)
Medal record
Men's alpine skiing
Representing Canada
Winter Pan American Games
Gold medal – first place	1990 Las Leñas	Slalom Downhill

Brian Stemmle (born October 12, 1966) is a Canadian retired World Cup alpine ski racer who competed primarily in the speed events of downhill and super-G. He was a member of the national ski team for fourteen years and was inducted into the Canadian Ski Hall of Fame in 2002. Stemmle competed for Canada in four Winter Olympic Games, from 1988 through 1998.

== Olympics ==
Stemmle represented Canada at four Winter Olympic Games. At the 1988 Games in Calgary, Stemmle competed in the downhill event at Nakiska, but missed a gate on his run and was disqualified. At the 1992 Games in Albertville, Stemmle finished 23rd in the downhill competition. Competing in the Super-G event at the 1994, Stemmle finished 26th. Stemmle's fourth time at the Olympics was at the 1998 Games in Nagano, competing in both the super-G and downhill. He finished twelfth in the super-G and did not finish in the downhill event, as he caught a rut low on the course, after being ahead of the eventual winner at the previous split by about half a second.

== History ==
Born in Aurora, Ontario, Stemmle was a member of the National Team from 1985 to 1999, and represented Canada at the 1988, 1992, 1994 and 1998 Olympic Winter Games.

During his 15 years of international competition, Stemmle competed in 93 World Cup races, garnering three podium finishes and fifteen top tens. His best result occurred in 1996, a runner-up finish in a downhill at Garmisch, Germany.

Known primarily as a downhill specialist, Stemmle's first World Cup podium came at age 18 in March 1985, in a super-G at Furano, Japan.

A six-time medalist at the Canadian Championships, Stemmle currently works as a television colour commentator for Rogers Sportsnet and CBC Sports. He worked for CBC during the Olympics in 2006 and was the lead commentator for Alpine Skiing at the 2010 Winter Olympics in Vancouver/Whistler.

== Kitzbühel ==
Stemmle suffered a major setback during a 1989 competition in Kitzbühel, Austria; a crash on the fabled Streif downhill course nearly ended not only his career, but his life. He fought back from a broken pelvis, massive internal injuries and infection by winning a gold medal at the 1990 Winter Pan American Games in Las Leñas, Argentina. Stemmle returned to the World Cup circuit for the next nine seasons until his retirement in 1999.
