= Roger Pramotton =

Italian alpine skier (born 1969)

Personal information
- Born: 17 May 1969 (age 57) Courmayeur, Italy

Skiing career
- Sport: Alpine skiing
- Retired: 2000
- Disciplines: Technical events
- World Cup debut: 1991

World Cup
- Seasons: 5
Medal record
World Junior Championships
| Gold medal – first place | 1987 Sälen | Slalom |
| Bronze medal – third place | 1987 Sälen | Combined |

Roger Pramotton (born 17 May 1969) is an Italian former alpine skier.

He is the brother of the other Italian alpine skier Richard Pramotton.
