= Angelo Weiss =

Italian alpine skier (born 1969)

Personal information
- Born: 9 February 1969 (age 57) Trento, Italy

Skiing career
- Sport: Alpine skiing
- Retired: 2003
- Disciplines: Technical events
- World Cup debut: 1996

World Cup
- Seasons: 8
- Wins: 1
- Podiums: 1

Angelo Weiss (born 9 February 1969) is an Italian alpine ski coach and former alpine skier who won a slalom race in FIS Alpine Ski World Cup.

== Career ==
He competed in the 1994 Winter Olympics and 1998 Winter Olympics.
