= Gerhard Königsrainer =

Italian alpine skier (born 1968)

Gerhard Königsrainer (also spelled Koenigsrainer, born 16 March 1968 in Merano) is an Italian former alpine skier who competed in the 1994 Winter Olympics.
