= Roman Torn =

Canadian alpine skier (born 1967)

Roman Torn (born 17 April 1967 in Burnaby, British Columbia) is a retired Canadian alpine skier who competed in the 1992 Winter Olympics. He only entered downhill and did not finish the race.

After retirement from competitive skiing, he was involved in the endurance races. In particular, in 2000 as part of the Canadian team he was second in COMPAQ event in New Zealand, where two of skiers from the team must be on the course all the time during the 50 km race. At the same year, he was second in the 24h endurance event in Aspen. Together with Rob Bosinger, he was also second in Aspen in 2003.
