= Michael Tritscher =

Austrian alpine skier (born 1965)

Michael Tritscher (born 6 November 1965) is an Austrian alpine skier. He was born in Schladming.

He finished seventh in the slalom at the 1989 World Championships in Vail, Colorado, and won the bronze medal in slalom at the 1992 Winter Olympics in Albertville.

He has also won several World Cup races.

== Achievements ==
Date	Location	Race
2 March 1991	(Norway) Lillehammer	Slalom
19 February 1995	(Japan) Furano	Slalom
19 November 1995	(United States) Beaver Creek	Slalom
