= David Pretot =

French alpine skier (born 1969)

David Pretot (born 1969) is a retired French alpine skier.

He competed in the slalom event at the 1987 Junior World Championships, finishing 7th. He later competed in the downhill and super-G events exclusively, including a lowly 44th-place finish at the 1996 World Championships.

He made his World Cup debut in January 1992 in Garmisch-Partenkirchen, also collecting his first World Cup points with a 20th place. He improved to 9th in January 1994 in Saalbach-Hinterglemm. After that, his best placement was an 11th place. His last World Cup outing came in January 2000 in Chamonix.

He represented the sports club CS Megeve.
