= Ralf Socher =

Canadian alpine skier (born 1967)

Ralf Socher (born 6 April 1967) is a Canadian retired alpine skier who competed in the 1994 Winter Olympics.

Socher was born in Vancouver.
