= Craig Thrasher =

American alpine skier (born 1970)

- Born: December 16, 1970 (age 55)
- Spouse: Cathryn
- Children: 3

Craig L. Thrasher (born December 16, 1970, in Chardon, Ohio) is an American former alpine skier who competed in the 1994 Winter Olympics, finishing 38th in the downhill race. He currently has a wife named Cathryn and three children.
