= Adrien Duvillard (alpine skier born 1969) =

French alpine skier (born 1969)

Adrien Duvillard (born 8 February 1969 in Megève) is a French former alpine skier who competed in the 1992 Winter Olympics and 1998 Winter Olympics.
