= Yves Dimier =

French alpine skier (born 1969)

Yves Dimier (born 25 July 1969 in Saint-Jean-de-Maurienne) is a French former alpine skier who competed in the men's slalom at the 1994 Winter Olympics, finishing 16th.
