= Mario Reiter =

Austrian alpine skier (born 1970)

Medal record

Representing Austria

Men's alpine skiing

Olympic Games
Gold medal – first place	1998 Nagano	Alpine Combined

World Championships
Silver medal – second place	1996 Sierra Nevada	Slalom
Bronze medal – third place	1997 Sestrière	Combined

Mario Reiter (born 5 November 1970 in Rankweil) is a former alpine skier from Austria. He won the gold medal in the combined event at the 1998 Olympics of Nagano. He retired from alpine skiing after the 2000/2001 season.

== World Cup victories ==
Date	Location	Race
20 February 1995	(Japan) Furano	Giant Slalom
27 January 1996	(Italy) Sestrières	Slalom
26 January 1997	(Austria) Kitzbühel	Slalom
