= Siegfried Voglreiter =

Austrian alpine skier (born 1969)

Siegfried Voglreiter (born 1969) is a retired Austrian alpine skier.

He made his World Cup debut in March 1992 in Crans Montana, also collecting his first World Cup points with an 18th place. He tied this placement twice in the same season, in addition to achieving a career best 6th place in December 1992 in Val d'Isere. The next years he finished steadily among the top 20, but from December 1994 he more frequently failed to finish his World Cup races. Finding his form again in 1996–97, he had a run consisting of a 4th, 6th, 2nd and 5th place. The podium placement was achieved in January 1997 in Kranjska Gora. Voglreiter also placed 5th in the slalom at the 1997 World Championships. After a less successful 1998–99 season, a 13th place in March 1999 in Sierra Nevada was his last World Cup outing.

He represented the sports club SC Piesendorf.
