= Luigi Colturi =

Italian alpine skier (1967–2010)

Luigi Colturi (17 March 1967 – 2 June 2010) was an Italian alpine skier who competed in the 1994 Winter Olympics.
