= Christian Mayer (skier) =

Austrian alpine skier (born 1972)

Medal record

Men's Alpine skiing

Olympic Games
Bronze medal – third place	1994 Lillehammer	Giant slalom
Bronze medal – third place	1998 Nagano	Alpine combined

World Championships
Bronze medal – third place	1999 Vail/Beaver Creek	Slalom

Christian Mayer (born 10 January 1972 in Villach) is an Austrian former alpine skier. He won the Alpine Ski World Cup Giant slalom title in 1993/94 (and two bronze-medals in Winter Olympic Games and one bronze-medal in FIS Alpine Skiing World Championships).

== World cup victories ==
Date	Location	Race
13 December 1993	(France) Val d'Isère	Giant slalom
21 December 1997	(Italy) Alta Badia	Giant slalom
3 January 1998	(Slovenia) Kranjska Gora	Giant slalom
11 March 1999	(Spain) Sierra Nevada	Super-G
22 December 1999	(Austria) Saalbach	Giant slalom
8 March 2000	(Slovenia) Kranjska Gora	Giant slalom
11 March 2000	(Austria) Hinterstoder	Giant slalom
