= Pietro Vitalini =

Italian alpine skier

Personal information
- Born: 29 June 1967 Bormio, Italy
- Height: 1.76 m (5 ft 9 in)

Skiing career
- Sport: Alpine skiing
- Retired: 1999
- World Cup debut: 1988

Olympics
- Teams: 1

World Championships
- Teams: 4

World Cup
- Seasons: 17
- Podiums: 5
Medal record
World Cup race podiums
Event	1st	2nd	3rd
Downhill	0	0	1
Super-G	0	3	1
Total	0	3	2

Pietro Vitalini (born 29 June 1967) is an Italian former alpine skier who competed in the 1994 Winter Olympics. Vitalini finished on the podium in FIS World Cup events five times in his career.

== Biography ==
Together with Kristian Ghedina, Peter Runggaldier, Werner Perathoner and Alessandro Fattori, he helped to bring out Italian Alpine skiing, traditionally more competitive in technical specialties, even in downhill and super-giant races. The Italian speed team, nicknamed Italjet, succeeded in the nineties in expressing itself at the high levels of the well-known Austrian and Swiss national teams.

== See also ==
- Italy national alpine ski team
