= Marcel Sulliger =

Swiss alpine skier (born 1967)

Marcel Sulliger (born 17 July 1967 in Saanen) is a Swiss former alpine skier who competed in the men's combined at the 1994 Winter Olympics, finishing 17th.
