= Kyle Rasmussen =

American alpine skier

Personal information
- Born: June 20, 1968 (age 58) Sonora, California, U.S.
- Height: 6 ft 0 in (1.83 m)

Skiing career
- Sport: Alpine skiing
- Retired: October 1998 (age 30)
- Disciplines: Downhill, Super G, Combined
- World Cup debut: December 8, 1990 (age 22) (first top 15)

Olympics
- Teams: 3 – (1992, 1994, 1998)
- Medals: 0

World Championships
- Teams: 2 – (1989, 1996)
- Medals: 0

World Cup
- Seasons: 7 – (1992–1998)
- Wins: 2 – (2 DH)
- Podiums: 3 – (2 DH, 1 SG)
- Overall titles: 0 – (17th in 1995)
- Discipline titles: 0 – (5th in SG, 1995)

Kyle A. Rasmussen (born June 20, 1968, in Sonora, California) is a former World Cup alpine ski racer from Angels Camp, California.

While competing with the U.S. Ski Team, he won two World Cup downhills in 1995 (Wengen and Kvitfjell), his best season, in which he finished sixth in the downhill standings, fifth in the Super-G standings, and 17th in the overall standings.

Rasmussen competed in three Winter Olympics in the 1990s and was ninth in the 1998 Downhill. With 12 top-ten finishes in his World Cup career, he retired from competition at age 30 in October 1998.

== World Cup results ==
=== Season standings ===
Season	Age	Overall	Slalom	Giant Slalom	Super G	Downhill	Combined
1991	22	91	–	–	–	39	–
1992	23	72	–	–	37	63	22
1993	24	102	–	–	57	–	21
1994	25	43	–	–	14	29	—
1995	26	17	–	–	5	6	–
1996	27	43	–	–	33	18	12
1997	28	74	–	–	–	28	–
1998	29	87	–	–	–	37	–

=== Race podiums ===
- 2 wins – (2 DH)
- 3 podiums – (2 DH, 1 SG), 12 top tens

Season	Date	Location	Discipline	Place
1995	Jan 21, 1995	Wengen, Switzerland	Downhill	1st
1995	Mar 10, 1995	Kvitfjell, Norway	Super G	3rd
1995	Mar 11, 1995	Kvitfjell, Norway	Downhill	1st

== World Championship results ==
Year	Age	Slalom	Giant Slalom	Super G	Downhill	Combined
1989	20	—	—	—	29	—
1991	22					
1993	24	injured, did not compete				
1996	27	—	—	40	14	—
1997	28	injured, did not compete				

== Olympic results ==
Year	Age	Slalom	Giant Slalom	Super G	Downhill	Combined
1992	23	—	—	17	16	16
1994	25	—	—	DSQ	11	31
1998	29	—	—	13	9	—
