= Alessandro Fattori =

Italian alpine skier

Personal information
- Born: 21 June 1973 (age 53) Parma, Italy
- Height: 1.77 m (5 ft 10 in)

Skiing career
- Sport: Alpine skiing
- Club: G.S. Fiamme Gialle
- Retired: 2010
- World Cup debut: 1994

Olympics
- Teams: 2
- Medals: 0 (0 gold)

World Championships
- Teams: 4
- Medals: 0 (0 gold)

World Cup
- Seasons: 15
- Wins: 2
- Podiums: 5
- Overall titles: 0
- Discipline titles: 0
Medal record
World Cup standings podiums
Event	1st	2nd	3rd
Super-G	0	0	1
World Cup race podiums
Event	1st	2nd	3rd
Downhill	1	0	1
Super-G	1	1	1
Total	2	1	2

Alessandro Fattori (born 21 June 1973) is an Italian former alpine skier who competed in the 1994 Winter Olympics, 1998 Winter Olympics, and 2002 Winter Olympics.

== Biography ==
Together with Kristian Ghedina, Peter Runggaldier, Werner Perathoner and Pietro Vitalini, he helped to bring out Italian Alpine skiing, traditionally more competitive in technical specialties, even in downhill and super-giant races. The Italian speed team, nicknamed Italjet, succeeded in the nineties in expressing itself at the high levels of the well-known Austrian and Swiss national teams.

== World Cup podiums ==
Date	Place	Discipline	Rank
31-01-2004	(Germany) Garmisch-Partenkirchen	Downhill	3rd
07-03-2002	(Austria) Altenmarkt-Zauchensee	Super G	3rd
03-03-2002	(Norway) Kvitfjell	Super G	1st
18-01-2002	(Austria) Kitzbuehel	Super G	2nd
16-12-2000	(France) Val d'Isere	Downhill	1st

== See also ==
- Italians who closed on the podium in the World Cup discipline standings
