= A. J. Kitt =

American alpine skier

A J Kitt
Personal information
- Born: September 13, 1968 (age 58) Rochester, New York, U.S.
- Height: 5 ft 11 in (180 cm)

Skiing career
- Sport: Alpine skiing
- Retired: March 1998 (age 29)
- Disciplines: Downhill, Super-G, Combined
- World Cup debut: January 1988 (age 19)

Olympics
- Teams: 4 – (1988–98)
- Medals: 0

World Championships
- Teams: 4 – (1989, '91, '93, '97)
- Medals: 1 (0 gold)

World Cup
- Seasons: 11 – (1988–98)
- Wins: 1 – (1 DH)
- Podiums: 6 – (5 DH, 1 SG)
- Overall titles: 0 – (10th in 1992)
- Discipline titles: 0 – (3rd in DH, 1992)
Medal record
Men's alpine skiing
Representing the United States
World Championships
Bronze medal – third place	1993 Morioka	Downhill
Winter Pan American Games
Gold medal – first place	1990 Las Leñas	Super-G
Bronze medal – third place	1990 Las Leñas	Slalom Downhill

Alva Ross "AJ" Kitt IV (born September 13, 1968) is a former World Cup alpine ski racer from the United States. A member of the U.S. Ski Team for over a decade, Kitt specialized in the speed event of downhill, and also raced in Super-G and combined. He retired from international competition following the 1998 season with six World Cup podiums, which included one downhill victory. Kitt was a bronze medalist in the downhill at the 1993 World Championships. He also had the lead in three World Cup races which were subsequently nullified by FIS officials, due to weather conditions that did not allow the entire field of competitors to start the race. In each, Kitt was awarded the race's prize money and trophies, but not the World Cup points.

== Early life ==
Born and raised in Rochester in western New York, Kitt started skiing at two years of age at nearby Swain Resort, where his parents, Ross and Nancy, were part-time ski instructors. Kitt began racing at age 6 and raced in the Genesee Valley Ski Council until age 14. In 1983 he began attending a ski academy in Lake Placid, the Mountain House School. Two years later as a high school junior, Kitt transferred to Green Mountain Valley School in Waitsfield, Vermont, where he graduated in 1986. During a post-graduate year training and racing as part of what is considered the first privateer ski team in U.S. history, Kitt and many of his training team members were selected to the U.S. Ski Team's National Training Group, the development team.

In only his first full season of World Cup racing in 1988, Kitt made the U.S. team at age 19 for the 1988 Winter Olympics at Calgary. He was the first American male alpine skier to compete in four Olympics, later passed by Bode Miller. Kitt is said to have "breathed life into a stagnant U.S. Ski team" when he won his first World Cup race in Val d'Isere, France, on December 7, 1991. It was the first victory of any kind for an American male in seven years. He spent much of the 1992 season ranked in the top five in the downhill standings, and finished strong at the end of the season to take third overall, the best season for an American downhiller at the time. He finished ninth in the downhill at the 1992 Winter Olympics, held on a different course than his World Cup victory two months prior.

In 1993, Kitt won the bronze medal at the World Championships in Morioka, Japan. He joined Doug Lewis as the only American men to win a World Championship medal in downhill. He was challenging for another medal in the combined, but missed a gate in the slalom's second run, hiked back up and finished 28th. During the 1990s, Kitt won four titles at the U.S. Alpine Championships.

Early in the 1996 season, he crashed hard in a downhill training run in early December at Val-d'Isère, the site of his only World Cup win four years earlier. He suffered a torn anterior cruciate ligament (ACL), along with other associated damage to his left knee, which ended his season, including the World Championships in Sierra Nevada, Spain. After surgery and six months of rehabilitation, Kitt returned for the 1997 season. The remainder of his career saw only one top-10 result, several top-20s and plenty of frustration. Kitt battled chronic back injuries in his final two seasons and retired in March 1998.

== World Cup results ==
=== Season standings ===
Season	Age	Overall	Slalom	Giant Slalom	Super-G	Downhill	Combined
1989	19	99	–	–	–	44	–
1989	20	no World Cup points (top 15)					
1991	21	51	–	–	–	15	–
1991	22	50	–	–	–	18	15
1992	23	10	–	–	36	3	8
1993	24	36	–	–	43	21	15
1994	25	55	–	–	45	21	—
1995	26	24	–	–	17	13	15
1996	27	132	–	–	–	56	–
1997	28	77	–	–	48	30	–
1998	29	92	–	–	54	38	–

=== Race podiums ===
- 1 win – (1 DH)
- 6 podiums – (5 DH, 1 SG), and 21 top tens

Season	Date	Location	Discipline	Place
1992	Dec 7, 1991	Val d'Isère, France	Downhill	1st
1992	Jan 18, 1992	Kitzbühel, Austria	Downhill	2nd
1992	Mar 7, 1992	Panorama, British Columbia, Canada	Downhill	3rd
1993	Dec 12, 1992	Val Gardena, Italy	Downhill	3rd
1995	Feb 26, 1995	Whistler, BC, Canada	Super G	2nd
1995	Mar 15, 1995	Bormio, Italy	Downhill	2nd

== World Championships results ==
Year	Age	Slalom	Giant Slalom	Super-G	Downhill	Combined
1989	20			–	32	
1991	22			–	20	DNF SL1
1993	24	–	–	cancelled	3	28
1996	27	injured, did not compete				
1997	28	–	–	25	23	—

- The U.S. team missed the super-G in 1991 due to the Gulf War.
- The Super-G in 1993 was cancelled after multiple weather delays.

== Olympic results ==
Kitt competed in four Winter Olympics; his best finish was ninth place in the downhill at Val-d'Isère in 1992.

Year	Age	Slalom	Giant Slalom	Super-G	Downhill	Combined
1988	19	—	—	DSQ	26	DNF SL2
1992	23	—	—	23	9	DNS SL1
1994	25	—	—	DSQ	17	—
1998	29	—	—	—	DNF	—

== Post career ==
Kitt continues to support ski racing in many forms. The Kitt Cup is a season long race series which takes place at the Swain ski resort where he first began his training.
He has been the traveling NASTAR pacesetter since 1999, and continues to provide race coaching. Kitt also gives inspirational guest speaking engagements to youth ski racers everywhere.

Kitt resides in Hood River, Oregon. He currently coaches U14 skiers for the Meadows Race Team at Mt. Hood Meadows.
