= Armin Assinger =

Austrian alpine skier

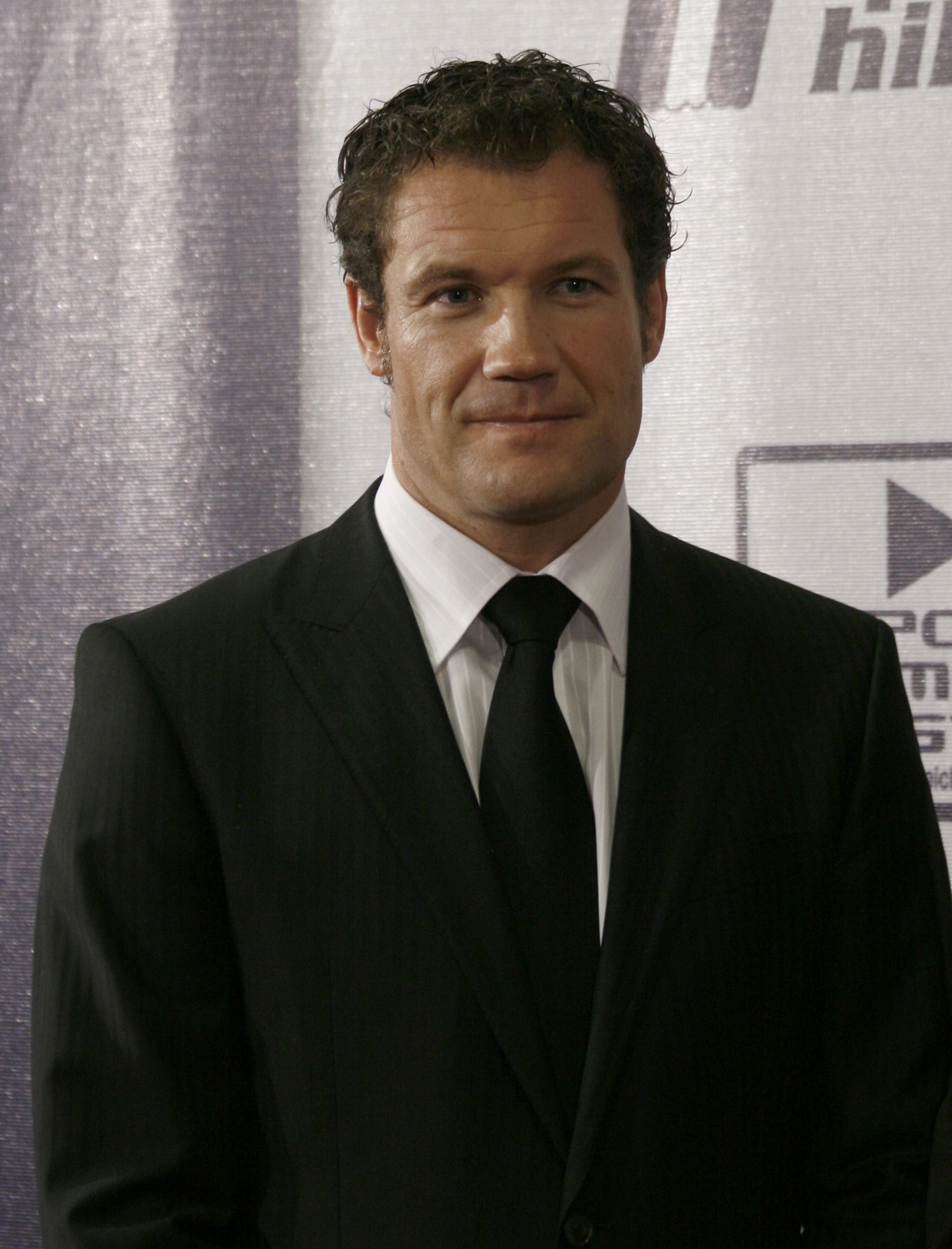
- Armin Assinger in 2008

Personal information
- Born: 7 June 1964 (age 62) Graz, Austria

Skiing career
- Sport: Alpine skiing
- Retired: 1995
- Disciplines: Speed events
- World Cup debut: 1986

World Cup
- Seasons: 10
- Wins: 4
- Podiums: 10
Medal record
Men's alpine skiing
Representing Austria
World Cup race podiums
Event	1st	2nd	3rd
Downhill	3	2	2
Super-G	1	0	2
Total	4	2	4

Armin Ignaz Assinger (born 7 June 1964) is a former Austrian Alpine skier and current host of the Millionenshow and Domino Day.

== Biography ==
Born in Graz (but growing up and living in Hermagor-Pressegger See, state Carinthia) he won a total of 4 World Cup races. He competed at the 1994 Winter Olympics.

== World Cup victories ==
Date	Location	Race
22 December 1992	(Austria) Bad Kleinkirchheim	Super-G
15 March 1993	(Spain) Sierra Nevada	Downhill
20 March 1993	(Norway) Kvitfjell	Downhill
17 December 1994	(France) Val-d'Isère	Downhill
