= Franco Cavegn =

Swiss alpine skier (born 1971)

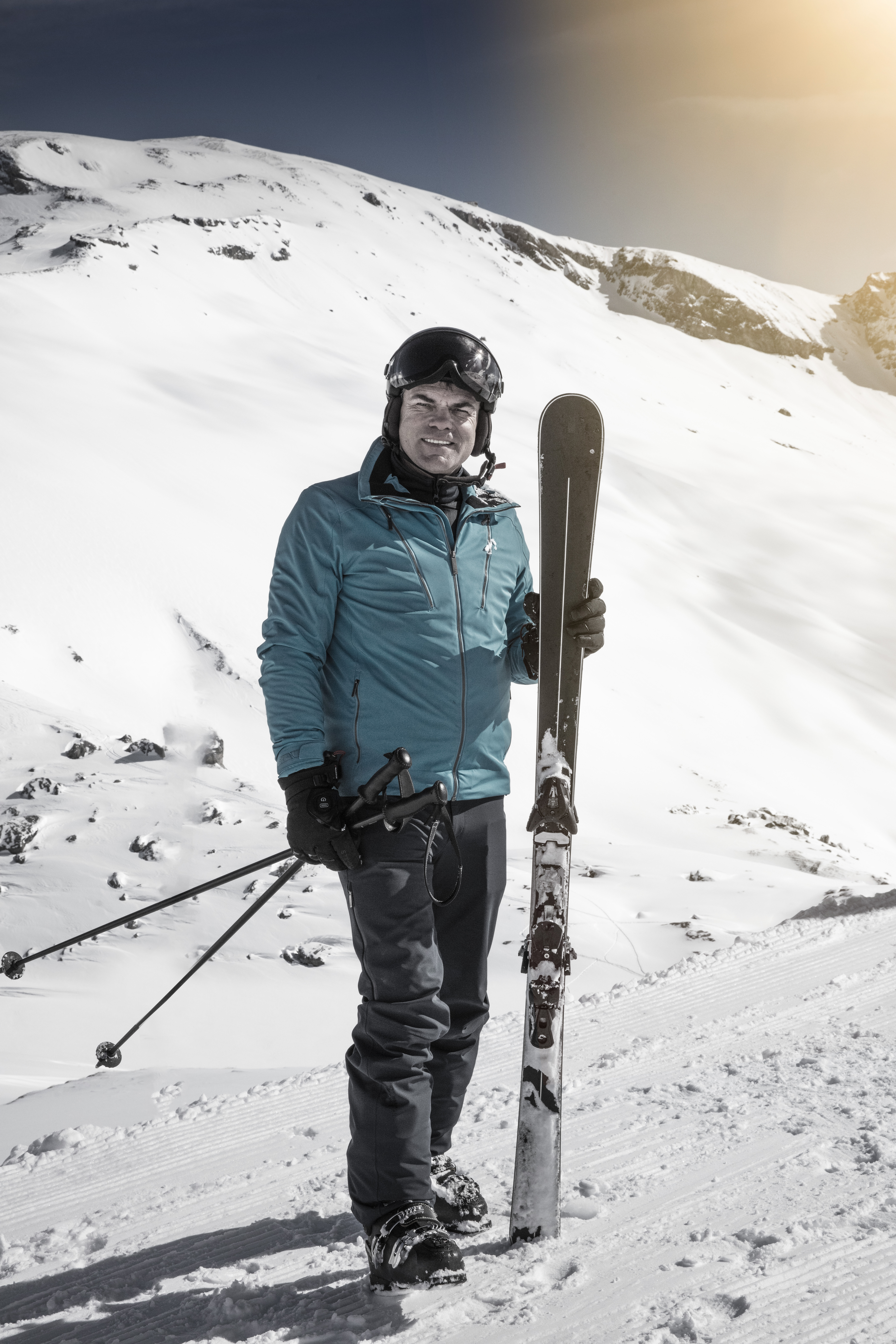

Franco Cavegn (born 6 January 1971) is a Swiss former alpine skier who competed in the 1994, 1998, and 2002 Winter Olympics.
