= Christophe Plé =

French alpine skier (born 1966)

Christophe Plé (born 29 April 1966) is a French former alpine skier who competed in the 1988 Winter Olympics and 1994 Winter Olympics.
