= Patrik Järbyn =

Swedish alpine skier (born 1969)

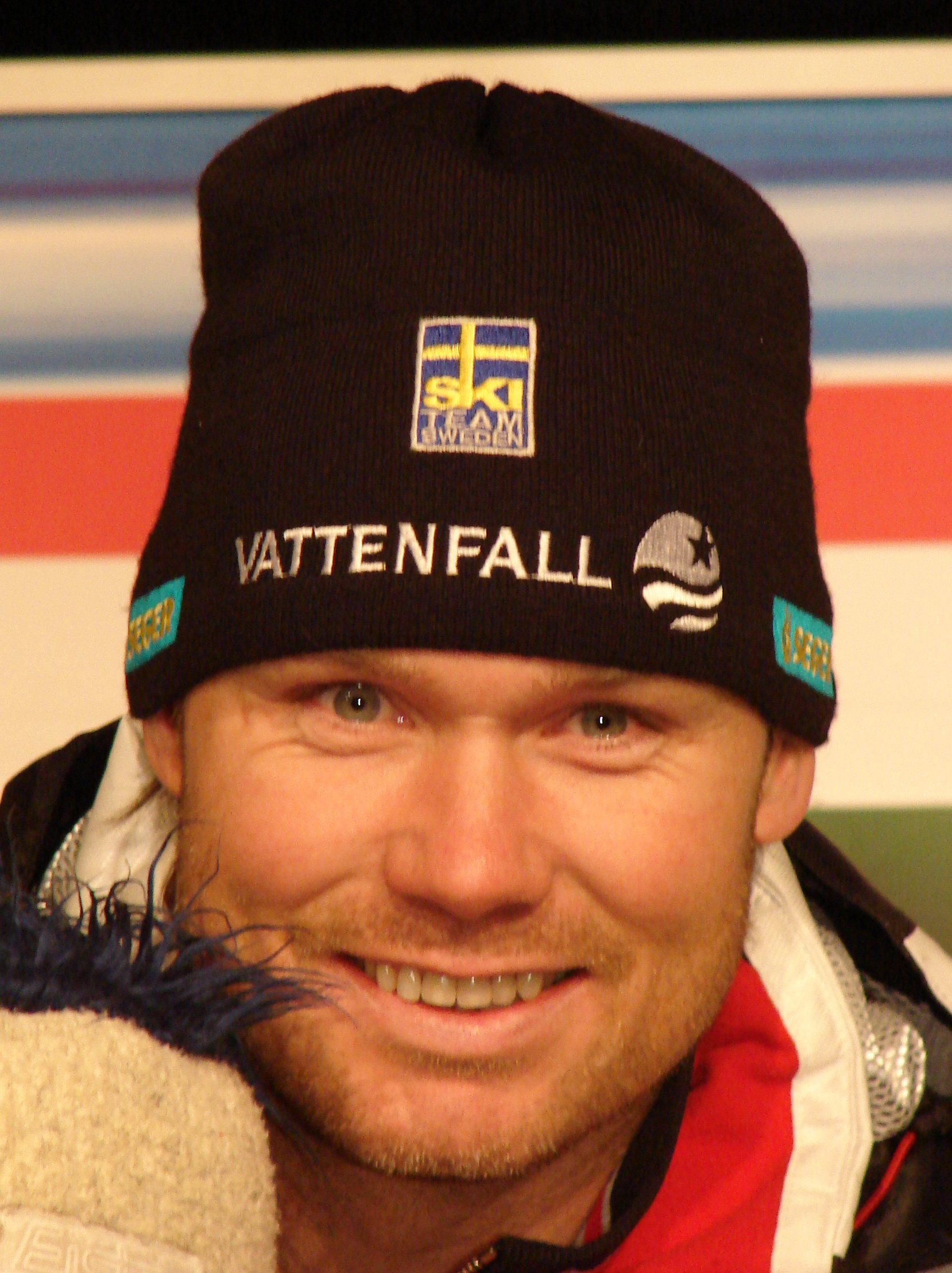
- Järbyn in December 2006

Personal information
- Born: 16 April 1969 (age 57)
Medal record
Men's alpine skiing
Representing Sweden
World Championships
Silver medal – second place	1996 Sierra Nevada	Super-G
Silver medal – second place	2007 Åre	Team event
Bronze medal – third place	2007 Åre	Downhill

Patrik Järbyn (born 16 April 1969 in Målsryd, Sweden) is a Swedish former World Cup alpine ski racer.

Despite never having won a World Cup race, Järbyn has two individual World Championship medals. At the 1996 World Championships in Sierra Nevada, Spain, he won the silver medal in super-G. In 2007 at Åre, Sweden, he won the bronze medal in the downhill to become the oldest medalist ever at a World Championships.

On 19 December 2008, Järbyn finished third in a super-G at Val Gardena, Italy, and set a new record as the oldest man to score a podium finish in a World Cup alpine race, at the age of 39 years and 9 months. Järbyn broke his own record, set with a third-place finish in the super-G at Lake Louise in November 2006 at the age of 37 years and 8 months.

On 19 February 2010, in the 2010 Winter Olympics in Vancouver, Järbyn suffered a concussion after crashing up in Whistler in the men's super-G and was air-lifted to a hospital by helicopter. On 7 March 2012, Järbyn officially announced his retirement. His last race was in Kvitfjell on 4 March 2012.
