= Hannes Trinkl =

Austrian alpine skier

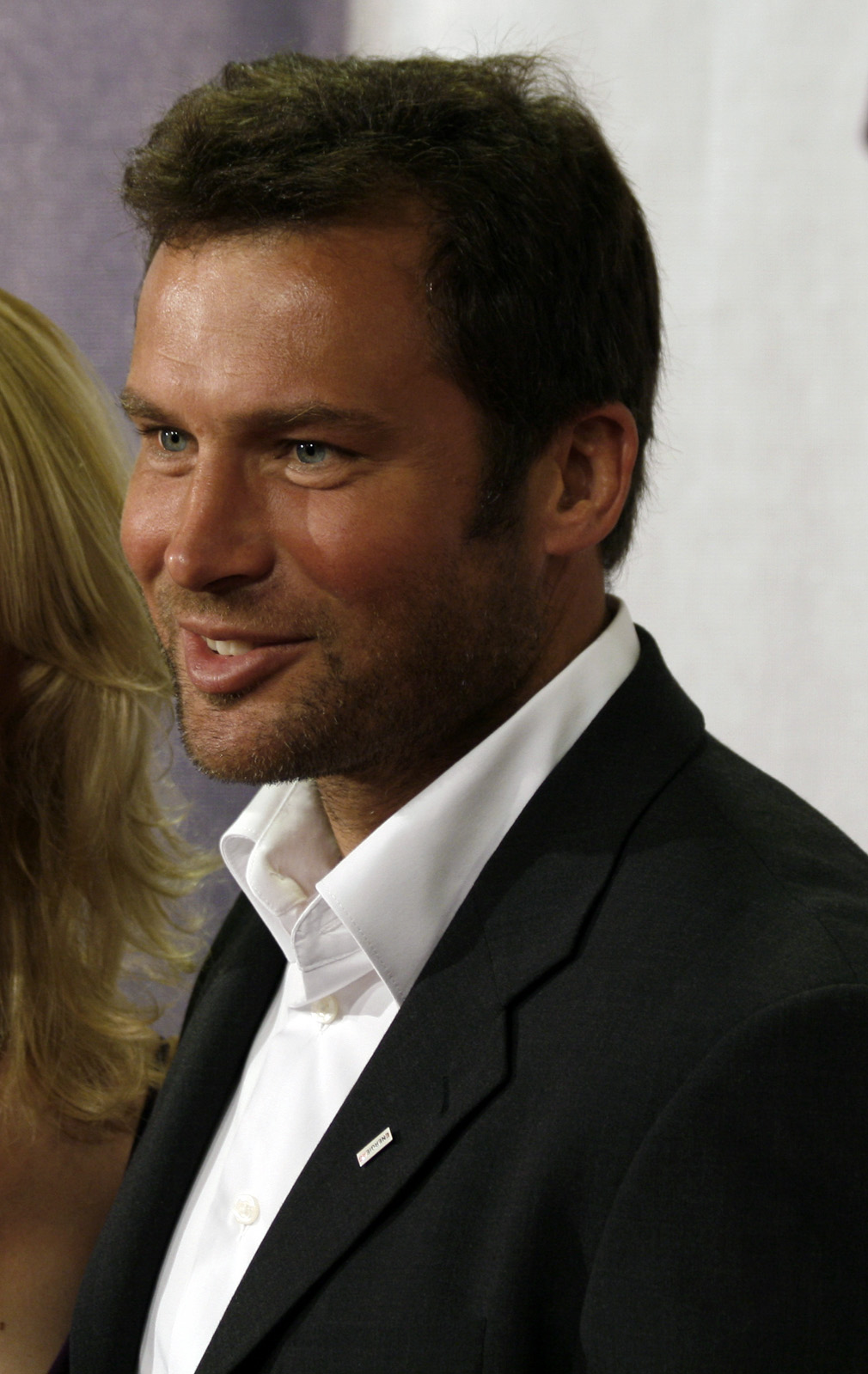

Medal record

Men's alpine skiing

Representing Austria

Olympic Games
Bronze medal – third place	1998 Nagano	Downhill

World Championships
Gold medal – first place	2001 St. Anton	Downhill

Hannes Trinkl (born 1 February 1968 in Steyr) is an Austrian former alpine skier.

Trinkl was the bronze medallist in the downhill in the 1998 Winter Olympics, finishing 0.01 seconds ahead of fourth-placed Jürg Grünenfelder.

His first World Cup victory was a Super-G in Lech in December 1993, where he won with a bib number of 51, after weather conditions improved after the early starters had completed their runs. This is the highest start number for a male Super-G winner until now.

Trinkl retired from competition in 2004. He subsequently served as race director for Alpine Skiing World Cup competitions in his hometown of Hinterstoder and vice president of the Austrian Ski Federation before being appointed as race director for men's speed events on the World Cup from the 2014–15 season.: As a race director of the International Ski Federation, abbreviated by its French initials, FIS, he also is the course setter for male downhill races in the World Cup, in the World Championships and in the Olympic Winter Games. In the Super-G he will support the course setter who is one of any other nation (but such a course setter is to determine by the FIS early enough; that will happen in regard to all matters of course settings, therefore also for slaloms and giant slaloms, male or female).

== World Cup victories ==
Date	Location	Race
December 22, 1993	(Austria) Lech	Super-G
December 29, 1993	(Italy) Bormio	Downhill
March 4, 1994	(United States) Aspen	Downhill
December 4, 1999	(Canada) Lake Louise	Downhill
March 15, 2000	(Italy) Bormio	Downhill
March 2, 2002	(Norway) Kvitfjell	Downhill
