= Ed Podivinsky =

Canadian alpine skier (born 1970)

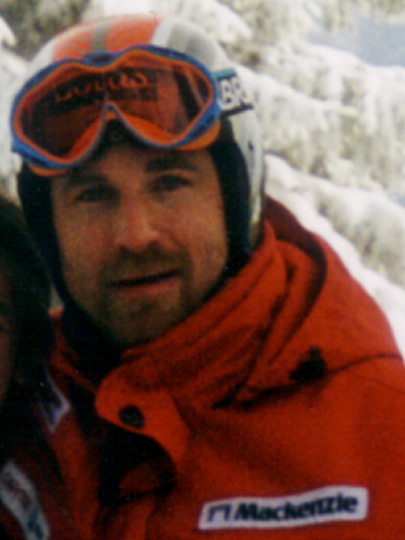

Personal information
- Born: March 8, 1970 (age 56) Edmonton, Alberta, Canada
Medal record
Men's Alpine skiing
Bronze medal – third place	1994 Lillehammer	Downhill

Edward "Ed" Charles Podivinsky (born March 8, 1970) is a Canadian alpine skier who competed in the 1994 Winter Olympics, 1998 Winter Olympics, and 2002 Winter Olympics. He was member of the 1992 Canadian Olympic (Albertville) team. He was injured in his last training run for the men's downhill event.

== Personal ==
Podivinsky was born in Edmonton, Alberta. He is of Czech descent. His brother Thomas died in a ski accident on February 16, 2014, at Whitefish Montana.

== Biography ==
Podivinsky was an Olympic bronze medalist. He competed for 13 years on the national team, captured a World Cup downhill in Saalbach, Austria. Ed was Canada's first world junior alpine champion in 1989. Before that, he skied as a forerunner at the 1988 Calgary Olympics. At 15, he was training with the national team. Former Olympian Carey Mullen recalled a Canadian alpine ski team race he and Podivinsky competed in as teenagers. Mullen, 16, came in 17th. Then 15-year-old Podivinsky flew into the finish area in third place, more than three seconds faster than Mullen. Although they started as rivals, the two became training partners and eventually friends. They both finidhrf 1-2 at a World Cup downhill in Saalbach in 1994. That set the stage for Lillehammer and Podivinsky's Olympic highlight. One of Podivinsky's favourite stories about reaching the podium in 1994 occurred soon after he crashed at the 1992 Olympics in Albertville. That spill happened on the final day of training in Val d'Isere, France, and took him out of the race. Within days, he was in a Vancouver hospital recovering from reconstructive knee surgery. "I was really groggy and Dr. Pat McConkey comes into my room, opens the drapes and turns on the TV," Podivinsky recalled. "He said, ‘[Canada's] Kerrin Lee-Gartner has just won gold. I repaired both those knees. You'd better make it back as well.'." Podivinsky made it back for Lillehammer, Nagano (where he placed fifth) and finally Salt Lake City (24th), where he knew his career was done. After retiring at 31, Podivinsky entered the world of finance. While competing, he studied for his chartered financial analyst exams and would spend time on trading floors during the off-season. He is Director of global equity sales for Royal Bank of Canada and a father of four, all of whom are skiers.

Ed currently works in the institutional equity division at RBC Capital Markets.

== Medals ==
In 1994, he won the bronze medal in the Alpine downhill event.

== Sports performance ==
Olympic Résulats

Lillehammer in 1994, 23 years
Skiing, downhill : 3rd place
Alpine Skiing Super G: Abandon
Skiing, Handset: Abandon

Nagano in 1998, 27 years

Skiing, downhill : 5th place
Alpine Skiing Super G: Disqualified
Skiing, downhill : Abandon

2002 Salt Lake City, 31 years old

Skiing, downhill : 24th place
Skiing, Handset: Abandon

1995 Résulats of National competitions and North American

7th place, Giant Slalom, Stoneham / Le Relais, Quebec
5th place, Slalom, Stoneham / Le Relais, Quebec
1st place, Downhill, Mont Ste- Anne, Quebec
3rd Place, Super G, Mont Ste- Anne, Quebec
3rd place, Downhill, Whitefish, Montana
9th place, Giant Slalom, Whistler, British Columbia

1996

6th place Slalom, Le Relais, Quebec
6th place, Giant Slalom, Stoneham, Quebec
1st place, Downhill, Mont Ste- Anne, Quebec

1997

3rd place Giant Slalom, Rossland, British Columbia
4th place, Downhill, Rossland, British Columbia
2nd place, Super G, Rossland, British Columbia

1998

1st place, Downhill Skiing, Jackson Hole, Wyoming

2000

6th place, Giant Slalom, Sun Peaks, British Columbia

2001

2nd place, Downhill Skiing, Lake Louise, Alberta
3rd place, Downhill Skiing, Lake Louise, Alberta
3rd place, Downhill, Mont Ste- Anne, Quebec
7th, Super G, Mont Ste- Anne, Quebec
8th place, Slalom, Mont Orford, Quebec

2002

4th place, Downhill Skiing, Whistler, British Columbia, Quebec

Résulats International Competitions 1988

8th place, Downhill, Madonna di Campiglio, Italy

1989

1st place, Downhill Aleyska, Alaska

1991

9th place, Giant Slalom, Saalbach -Hinterglemm, Austria

1994

1st place, Downhill, Saalbach -Hinterglemm, Austria
5th place, Handset, Chamonix, France
3rd place, Downhill Skiing, Lillehammer, Norway
7th place, Downhill, Aspen, United States of America
4th place, Downhill, Aspen, United States of America
5th place, Downhill, Cail, United States of America

1995

4th place, Downhill Kitzbühel, Austria
7th place, Handset, Wengen, Switzerland
5th place, Downhill, Saalbach -Hinterglemm, Austria
4th, Super G, Whistler, British Columbia
4th place, Downhill, Mont Ste- Anne, Quebec
9th place, Giant Slalom, Whistler, British Columbia
4th, Super G, El Colorado / Farellone, Chile
10th place, Downhill Skiing, Vail, Colorado
3rd place, Downhill, Bormio, Italy

1996

5th place, Handset, Kitzbühel, Austria
2nd place Super -G, Garmisch -Partenkirchen, Germany
2nd place, Downhill, Mont Ste Anne, Quebec
3rd place Slalom, Mont Garceau, Quebec
2nd place Giant Slalom, Mont Garceau, Quebec
4th place, Downhill, Bormio, Italy

1997

10th place, Downhill Kitzbühel, Austria
4th, Super G, Garmisch -Partenkirchen, Germany
3rd place, Downhill Kvitfjell, Norway
5th place, Downhill, Valle Nevado / LaParva, Chile

1998

9th place, Downhill, Wengen, Switzerland
3rd place, Handset, Kitzbühel, Austria
1st place, Downhill, Jackson, Wyoming

1999

3rd place, Downhill, Val Gardena, Italy
10th place, Downhill Skiing, Val Gardena, Italy

2000

3rd place, Downhill, Wengen, Switzerland
5th place, Downhill, Bormio, Italy

== World Cup victories ==
Date	Location	Race
6 January 1994	(Austria) Saalbach	Downhill
