= Werner Perathoner =

Italian former Alpine skier (born 1967)

Personal information
- Born: 21 September 1967 (age 59) Brixen, Italy
- Height: 1.79 m (5 ft 10 in)

Skiing career
- Sport: Alpine skiing
- Club: C.S. Carabinieri
- Retired: 1999
- Disciplines: Speed events

Olympics
- Teams: 3

World Championships
- Teams: 4

World Cup
- Seasons: 8
- Wins: 2
- Podiums: 11
Medal record
World Cup race podiums
Event	1st	2nd	3rd
Super-G	2	1	3
Downhill	0	3	2
Total	2	4	5

Werner Perathoner (born 21 September 1967) is an Italian former Alpine skier, who specialized in downhill and super-G disciplines.

Although he is also from South Tyrol, he is not a relative of the other Italian skier Lukas Perathoner.

== Biography ==
Born in Selva di Val Gardena, in the Province of Bolzano, he obtained his first podium in World Cup in 1988, at the Leukerbad downhill, one of his country's most memorable races ever with three Italians occupying the whole podium. A victim of numerous accidents, he won two World Cup races, both in Super-G.

He competed at the 1994 and 1998 Winter Olympics.

== World Cup victories ==
Date	Location	Race
11 March 1995	(Norway) Kvitfjell	Super-G
5 February 1996	(Germany) Garmisch-Partenkirchen	Super-G
