= Harald Strand Nilsen =

Norwegian alpine skier (born 1971)

Medal record

Men's alpine skiing
Bronze medal – third place	1994 Lillehammer	Combined

Harald Christian Strand Nilsen (born 7 May 1971) is a retired Norwegian alpine skier.

Born in Gjøvik, the all-rounder won no World Cup Races during his active career, but gained several podiums, especially in the 1994/95 season, where he ended third in the Giant Slalom World Cup behind Alberto Tomba and Jure Kosir. The 13th place in the overall Alpine skiing World Cup was to become his best classification in any year.

In the following years Strand Nilsen specialised in slalom and regularly managed to be among the top 15 in World Cup races. However, he would never quite tie in with his earlier successes of 1994 and 1995.

In the Lillehammer Winter Olympics in 1994 he won third place in the Combined event, behind his fellow countrymen Lasse Kjus and Kjetil André Aamodt.

He retired at the end of the 2002/03 season.

Strand Nilsen is today situated in his hometown Gjøvik, Norway.
