= Kristian Ghedina =

Italian alpine skier (born 1969)

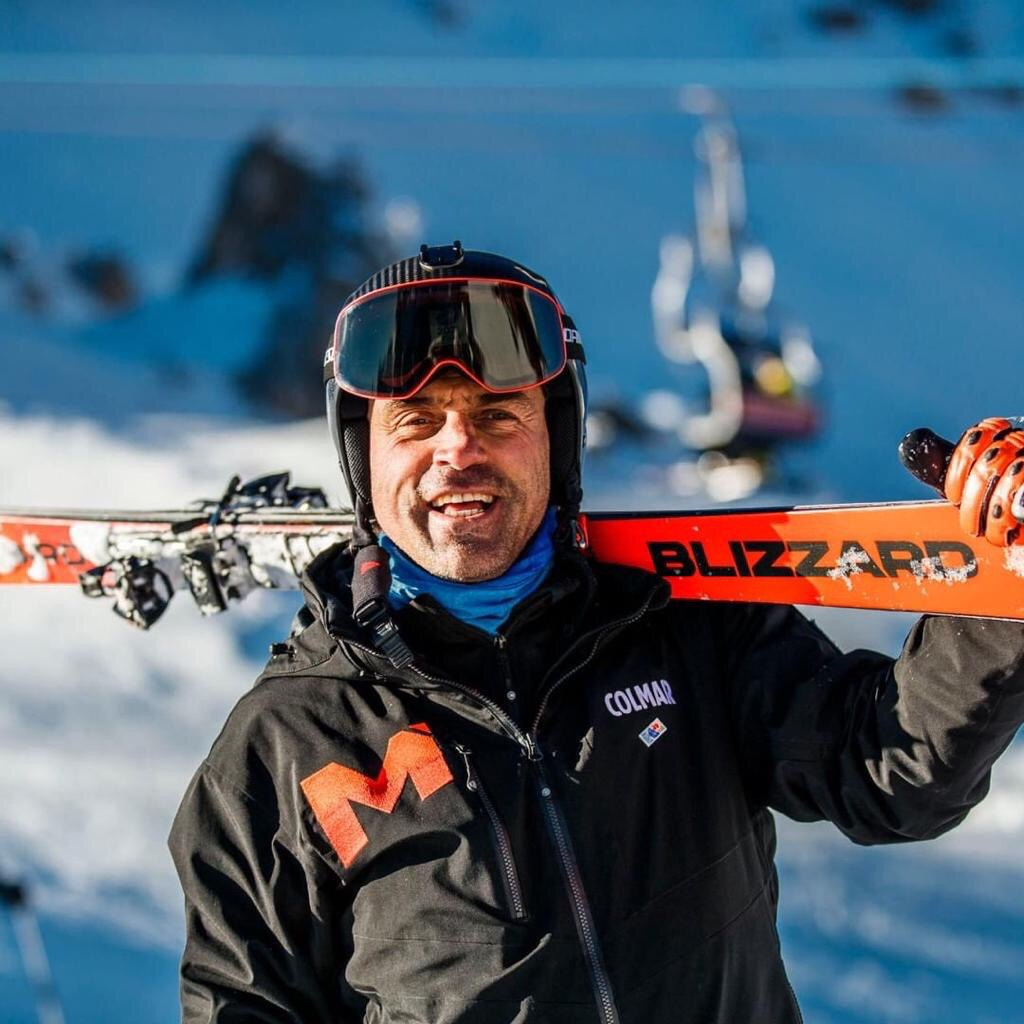
- Ghedina in 2020.

Personal information
- Born: 20 November 1969 (age 56) Cortina d'Ampezzo, Italy

Skiing career
- Sport: Alpine skiing
- Club: G.S. Fiamme Gialle
- Disciplines: Downhill

World Championships
- Medals: 3 (0 gold)

World Cup
- Seasons: 17
- Wins: 13
- Podiums: 33
- Overall titles: 0 (4th 1997, 2000)
- Discipline titles: 0 (2nd DH 1995, 1997, 2000)
Medal record
International alpine ski competitions
Event	1st	2nd	3rd
Olympic Games	0	0	0
World Championships	0	2	1
Total	0	2	1
World Cup race podiums
Event	1st	2nd	3rd
Downhill	12	9	8
Super-G	1	2	1
Total	13	11	9
World Championships
Silver medal – second place	1996 Sierra Nevada	Downhill
Silver medal – second place	1991 Saalbach	Combined
Bronze medal – third place	1997 Sestriere	Downhill

Kristian Ghedina (Italian pronunciation: [ˈkristjaŋ ɡeˈdiːna]; born 20 November 1969) is an Italian alpine skiing coach and former competitive racer. His 13 victories are the second most by an Italian downhill specialist in World Cup history: the first is Dominik Paris with 21 victories. He is currently an auto racer.

== Biography ==
Ghedina was born in Cortina d'Ampezzo in the province of Belluno, and his mother tongue is Ladin. He studied in Innsbruck and made his World Cup debut in 1989. The following year, after a series of initial podiums and a ruinous fall, he won the last two downhills of the season. He won the silver medal in the Combined race of the 1991 World Championships at Saalbach, Austria; however, the following year he suffered a serious car crash.

Ghedina returned to his best form only in 1995, remaining among the best specialists in the speed disciplines until 2001, when he obtained the last of his 13 World Cup victories (12 Downhills and one Super-G, with a total of 33 podiums). He won also another silver medal at the 1996 and a bronze in the 1997 championships, both in downhill. After his last World Cup victory he kept on racing for another five seasons, reaching 15 top-ten results, two of them podiums.

Ghedina probably gave his most remarkable performance on 24 January 2004 at the Hahnenkamm race in Kitzbühel: on the last jump, approaching the finish line at a speed of 137,6 km/h, he produced a straddle in the air ("spread eagle") which amazed spectators and TV commentators; nevertheless he gained a temporary lead in the race, which he finished sixth in the end.

Ghedina retired from ski racing following the 2006 season. He has raced a BMW in the Italian Superturismo Championship and, driving a Lola, in the Formula 3000 International Masters. In 2012, he started working with the Croatian national ski team, advising the team on the alpine speed disciplines.

== World Cup results ==
=== Podium ===
- 13 wins (12 DH, 1 SG)
- 33 podiums (29 DH, 4 SG)

Date	Place	Discipline	Rank
16/12/1989	(Italy) Val Gardena	Downhill	3rd
11/01/1990	(Austria) Schladming	Downhill	2nd
03/02/1990	(Italy) Cortina d'Ampezzo	Downhill	1st
15/03/1990	(Sweden) Åre	Downhill	1st
13/01/1995	(Austria) Kitzbühel	Downhill	3rd
20/01/1995	(Switzerland) Wengen	Downhill	1st
25/02/1995	(Canada) Whistler, BC	Downhill	1st
10/03/1995	(Norway) Kvitfjell	Super G	2nd
11/03/1995	(Norway) Kvitfjell	Downhill	2nd
06/03/1996	(Norway) Kvitfjell	Downhill	3rd
20/12/1996	(Italy) Val Gardena	Downhill	3rd
21/12/1996	(Italy) Val Gardena	Downhill	1st
29/12/1996	(Italy) Bormio	Downhill	3rd
11/01/1997	(France) Chamonix	Downhill	1st
18/01/1997	(Switzerland) Wengen	Downhill	1st
22/02/1997	(Germany) Garmisch-Partenkirchen	Downhill	3rd
23/02/1997	(Germany) Garmisch-Partenkirchen	Super G	2nd
12/03/1997	(United States) Vail, CO	Downhill	2nd
13/03/1997	(United States) Vail, CO	Super G	3rd
04/12/1997	(United States) Beaver Creek, CO	Downhill	1st
24/01/1998	(Austria) Kitzbühel	Downhill	1st
19/12/1998	(Italy) Val Gardena	Downhill	1st
27/11/1999	(United States) Vail, CO	Downhill	3rd
17/12/1999	(Italy) Val Gardena	Downhill	1st
18/12/1999	(Italy) Val Gardena	Downhill	2nd
22/01/2000	(Austria) Kitzbühel	Downhill	2nd
29/01/2000	(Germany) Garmisch-Partenkirchen	Downhill	2nd
04/03/2000	(Norway) Kvitfjell	Downhill	2nd
05/03/2000	(Norway) Kvitfjell	Super G	1st
16/12/2000	(France) Val d'Isere	Downhill	2nd
14/12/2001	(Italy) Val Gardena	Downhill	1st
02/03/2002	(Norway) Kvitfjell	Downhill	3rd
08/01/2005	(France) Chamonix	Downhill	2nd

=== Overall ===
Year/Rank	Overall		Downhill		Giant		Super-G		Combined	
Year/Rank	Rank	Points	Rank	Points	Rank	Points	Rank	Points	Rank	Points
1990	15th	97	6th	98	-	-	-	-	7th	10
1991	22nd	63	11th	40	32nd	3	19th	10	6th	10
1992	43rd	206	15th	147	-	-	39th	33	29th	26
1993	57th	139	27th	110	-	-	-	-	20th	29
1994	40th	207	19th	146	-	-	39th	9	7th	52
1995	7th	628	2nd	473	32nd	29	7th	126	-	-
1996	15th	492	8th	237	46th	9	10th	170	5th	76
1997	4th	990	2nd	700	-	-	5th	218	6th	72
1998	11th	544	6th	412	-	-	10th	114	-	-
1999	20th	355	8th	296	-	-	36th	14	9th	45
2000	4th	958	2nd	677	-	-	8th	216	8th	65
2001	60th	95	21st	95	-	-	-	-	-	-
2002	10th	505	3rd	381	-	-	15th	88	12th	36
2003	98th	38	36th	35	-	-	57th	3	-	-
2004	49th	169	20th	169	-	-	-	-	-	-
2005	32nd	257	12th	225	-	-	34th	32	-	-
2006	35th	235	10th	235	-	-	-	-	-	-

== See also ==
- Italian skiers who closed in top 10 in overall World Cup
