= Alpine skiing at the 1998 Winter Olympics – Men's slalom =

Men's slalom at the XVIII Olympic Winter Games
- Alpine skiing
- Venue: Shiga Kogen
- Date: February 21, 1998
- Competitors: 65 from 31 nations
- Winning time: 1:49.31

Medalists
1st place, gold medalist(s)		Hans Petter Buraas	Norway
2nd place, silver medalist(s)		Ole Kristian Furuseth	Norway
3rd place, bronze medalist(s)		Thomas Sykora	Austria

The Men's slalom competition of the Nagano 1998 Olympics was held at Shiga Kogen.

The defending world champion was Tom Stiansen of Norway, while Austria's Thomas Sykora was the defending World Cup slalom champion.

== Results ==
Rank	Name	Country	Run 1	Run 2	Total	Difference
1st place, gold medalist(s)	Hans Petter Buraas	Norway	0:55.28	0:54.03	1:49.31	-
2nd place, silver medalist(s)	Ole Kristian Furuseth	Norway	0:55.53	0:55.11	1:50.64	+1.33
3rd place, bronze medalist(s)	Thomas Sykora	Austria	0:55.06	0:55.62	1:50.68	+1.37
4	Tom Stiansen	Norway	0:55.70	0:55.20	1:50.90	+1.59
5	Christian Mayer	Austria	0:56.37	0:54.72	1:51.09	+1.78
6	Thomas Stangassinger	Austria	0:55.63	0:55.62	1:51.25	+1.94
7	Finn Christian Jagge	Norway	0:56.06	0:55.33	1:51.39	+2.08
8	Joël Chenal	France	0:56.68	0:54.83	1:51.51	+2.20
9	Kalle Palander	Finland	0:56.37	0:55.44	1:51.81	+2.50
10	Pierrick Bourgeat	France	0:56.28	0:55.54	1:51.82	+2.51
11	Matteo Nana	Italy	0:56.59	0:55.37	1:51.96	+2.65
12	Didier Plaschy	Switzerland	0:56.67	0:55.36	1:52.03	+2.72
13	Kiminobu Kimura	Japan	0:56.53	0:55.62	1:52.15	+2.84
14	Sébastien Amiez	France	0:56.96	0:55.23	1:52.19	+2.88
15	Matt Grosjean	United States	0:56.58	0:55.98	1:52.56	+3.25
16	Angelo Weiss	Italy	0:56.87	0:55.93	1:52.80	+3.49
17	Matjaž Vrhovnik	Slovenia	0:57.36	0:57.29	1:54.65	+5.34
18	Paul Accola	Switzerland	0:57.56	0:57.35	1:54.91	+5.60
19	Michael von Grünigen	Switzerland	0:57.33	0:57.63	1:54.96	+5.65
20	Gaku Hirasawa	Japan	0:57.74	0:57.50	1:55.24	+5.93
21	Takuya Ishioka	Japan	0:58.85	0:56.84	1:55.69	+6.38
22	Stefan Georgiev	Bulgaria	0:57.95	0:58.17	1:56.12	+6.81
23	Hur Seung-Wook	South Korea	0:59.94	0:58.07	1:58.01	+8.70
24	Gabriel Hottegindre	Uruguay	1:01.98	1:01.29	2:03.27	+13.96
25	Sveinn Brynjólfsson	Iceland	1:03.58	1:02.66	2:06.24	+16.93
26	Alex Heath	South Africa	1:06.82	1:07.62	2:14.44	+25.13
27	Arsen Harutyunyan	Armenia	1:07.51	1:07.60	2:15.11	+25.80
28	Komil Urunbayev	Uzbekistan	1:09.55	1:09.30	2:18.85	+29.54
29	Arif Alaftargil	Turkey	1:12.36	1:12.73	2:25.09	+35.78
30	Hassan Shemshaki	Iran	1:13.59	1:13.40	2:26.99	+37.68
31	William Schenker	Puerto Rico	1:12.95	1:15.93	2:28.88	+39.57
-	Alberto Tomba	Italy	0:57.00	DNS	-	-
-	Drago Grubelnik	Slovenia	0:57.06	DQ	-	-
-	Andrzej Bachleda-Curuś	Poland	0:57.45	DNF	-	-
-	Bode Miller	United States	0:57.52	DNF	-	-
-	Marcel Maxa	Czech Republic	0:57.81	DNF	-	-
-	Thomas Lödler	Croatia	0:57.91	DNF	-	-
-	Petar Dichev	Bulgaria	0:59.62	DNF	-	-
-	Fabrizio Tescari	Italy	DNF	-	-	-
-	Andrej Miklavc	Slovenia	DNF	-	-	-
-	Jure Košir	Slovenia	DNF	-	-	-
-	Kristinn Björnsson	Iceland	DNF	-	-	-
-	Martin Hansson	Sweden	DNF	-	-	-
-	Mario Reiter	Austria	DNF	-	-	-
-	Markus Eberle	Germany	DNF	-	-	-
-	Thomas Grandi	Canada	DNF	-	-	-
-	François Simond	France	DNF	-	-	-
-	Marco Casanova	Switzerland	DNF	-	-	-
-	Mika Marila	Finland	DNF	-	-	-
-	Chip Knight	United States	DNF	-	-	-
-	Andy Leroy	United States	DNF	-	-	-
-	Kentaro Minagawa	Japan	DNF	-	-	-
-	Haukur Arnórsson	Iceland	DNF	-	-	-
-	Gerard Escoda	Andorra	DNF	-	-	-
-	Arnór Gunnarsson	Iceland	DNF	-	-	-
-	Lyubomir Popov	Bulgaria	DNF	-	-	-
-	Sami Uotila	Finland	DNF	-	-	-
-	Victor Gómez	Andorra	DNF	-	-	-
-	Byun Jong-Moon	South Korea	DNF	-	-	-
-	Angel Pumpalov	Bulgaria	DNF	-	-	-
-	Arne Hardenberg	Denmark	DNF	-	-	-
-	Vasilios Dimitriadis	Greece	DNF	-	-	-
-	Levan Abramishvili	Georgia	DNF	-	-	-
-	Andreas Vasili	Cyprus	DNF	-	-	-
-	Alain Baxter	Great Britain	DQ	-	-	-
