= Hungary at the 1998 Winter Olympics =

- IOC code: HUN
- NOC: Hungarian Olympic Committee
- Website: www.olimpia.hu (in Hungarian and English)

in Nagano
- Competitors: 17 (8 men and 9 women) in 6 sports
- Flag bearer: Krisztina Egyed (speed skating)
- Officials: Krisztina Czakó; János Panyik
- Medals: Gold 0 Silver 0 Bronze 0 Total 0

Winter Olympics appearances (overview)
- 1924; 1928; 1932; 1936; 1948; 1952; 1956; 1960; 1964; 1968; 1972; 1976; 1980; 1984; 1988; 1992; 1994; 1998; 2002; 2006; 2010; 2014; 2018; 2022; 2026

Hungary was represented at the 1998 Winter Olympics in Nagano, Japan by the Hungarian Olympic Committee.

In total, 17 athletes including eight men and nine women represented Hungary in six different sports including alpine skiing, biathlon, bobsleigh, cross-country skiing, figure skating and speed skating.

== Competitors ==
In total, 17 athletes represented Hungary at the 1998 Winter Olympics in Nagano, Japan across six different sports.

Sport	Men	Women	Total
Alpine skiing	0	3	3
Biathlon	1	4	5
Bobsleigh	4	–	4
Cross-country skiing	1	0	1
Figure skating	1	1	2
Speed skating	1	1	2
Total	8	9	17

== Alpine skiing ==
In total, three Hungarian athletes participated in the alpine skiing events – Kinga Barsi and Marika Labancz in the women's slalom and Mónika Kovács in the women's downhill, the women's super-G, the women's giant slalom and the women's combined.

The women's super-G was due to take place on 10 February 1998 but was postponed due to heavy snow and instead took place on 11 February 1998. Kovács completed the course in a time of one minute 24.77 seconds to finish 40th overall.

The women's downhill was due to take place on 14 February 1998 but was postponed twice due to the weather and instead took place on 16 February 1998. Kovács completed the course in a time of one minute 37.03 seconds. However, she was disqualified for missing a gate.

The women's slalom took place on 19 February 1998. Neither Barsi nor Labancz finished their first run and they did not take part in the second run.

The women's giant slalom took place on 20 February 1998. Kovács completed her first run in a time of one minute 30.73 seconds. She completed her second run in a time of one minute 44.83 seconds for a total time of three minutes 15.56 seconds to finish 32nd overall.

Athlete	Event	Race 1	Race 2	Total	
Athlete	Event	Time	Time	Time	Rank
Kinga Barsi	Slalom	DNF	–	DNF	–
Marika Labancz	Slalom	DNF	–	DNF	–
Mónika Kovács	Downhill			DSQ	–
Mónika Kovács	Super-G			1:24.77	40
Mónika Kovács	Giant slalom	1:30.73	1:44.83	3:15.56	32

The women's combined took place on 16 and 17 February 1998. Calello completed her downhill run in a time of one minute 37.35 seconds and her first slalom run in a time of 45.90 seconds. She completed her second slalom run in a time of 43.06 seconds for a total time of three minutes 6.31 seconds to finish 21st overall.

Athlete	Event	Downhill	Slalom		Total	
Athlete	Event	Time	Time 1	Time 2	Total time	Rank
Women's combined	Mónika Kovács	1:37.35	45.90	43.06	3:06.31	21

== Biathlon ==
In total, five Hungarian athletes participated in the biathlon events – Zsuzsanna Bekecs and Bernadett Dira in the women's sprint, János Panyik in the men's sprint and Anna Bozsik and Éva Szemcsák in the women's individual.

The men's sprint was due to take place on 17 February 1998 but was postponed due to snow and fog and instead took place on 18 February 1998. Panyik completed the course in 31 minutes 50 seconds with one shooting miss to finish 63rd overall.

The women's sprint took place on 15 February 1998. Dira completed the course in 28 minutes 48.9 seconds with five shooting misses to finish 63rd overall. Bekecs completed the course in 29 minutes 50.3 seconds with six shooting misses to finish 64th overall.

Event	Athlete	Misses ^{1}	Time	Rank
Men's 10 km sprint	János Panyik	1	31:50.0	63
Women's 7.5 km sprint	Zsuzsanna Bekecs	6	29:50.3	64
Women's 7.5 km sprint	Bernadett Dira	5	28:48.9	63

The women's individual took place on 9 February 1998. Bozsik completed the course in 59 minutes 41.1 seconds but with six shooting misses for an adjusted time of one hour five minutes 41.1 seconds to finish 57th overall. Szemcsák completed the course in one hour 51.8 seconds but with five shooting miss for an adjusted time of one hour five minutes 51.8 seconds to finish 58th overall.

Event	Athlete	Time	Misses	Adjusted time ^{2}	Rank
Women's 15 km	Éva Szemcsák	1'00:51.8	5	1'05:51.8	58
Women's 15 km	Anna Bozsik	59:41.1	6	1'05:41.1	57

^{1} A penalty loop of 150 metres had to be skied per missed target.
^{2} One minute added per missed target.

== Bobsleigh ==
In total, four Hungarian athletes participated in the bobsleigh events – Nicholas Frankl, Péter Pallai, Bertalan Pintér and Zsolt Zsombor in the four-man bob.

The four-man bobsleigh took place on 20 and 21 February 1998. The second run was cancelled due to the weather so the event was reduced to three runs. Across their three runs, Hungary recorded a combined time of two minutes 44.92 seconds and finished 24th overall.

Sled	Athletes	Event	Run 1		Run 2		Run 3		Total	
Sled	Athletes	Event	Time	Rank	Time	Rank	Time	Rank	Time	Rank
HUN-1	Nicholas Frankl; Péter Pallai; Zsolt Zsombor; Bertalan Pintér	Four-man	55.16	25	54.82	23	54.94	23	2:44.92	24

== Cross-country skiing ==
In total, one Hungarian athlete participated in the cross-country skiing events – Balázs Latrompette Yann in the men's 10 km classical.

The men's 10 km classical took place on 12 February 1998. Yann completed the course in 35 minutes 30.9 seconds to finish 89th overall.

Event	Athlete	Race	
Event	Athlete	Time	Rank
10 km C	Balázs Latrompette Yann	35:30.9	89

C = Classical style, F = Freestyle

== Figure skating ==
In total, two Hungarian athletes participated in the figure skating events – Júlia Sebestyén in the women's singles and Szabolcs Vidrai in the men's singles.

The men's singles took place on 12 and 14 February 1998. Vidrai was ranked 12th in the short programme and 13th in the free skate to finish 13th overall.

The women's singles took place on 18 and 20 February 1998. Sebestyén was ranked 19th in the short programme and 15th in the free skate to finish 15th overall.

Athlete	Event	SP	FS	TFP	Rank
Szabolcs Vidrai	Men's singles	12	13	19.0	13
Júlia Sebestyén	Women's singles	19	15	24.5	15

== Speed skating ==
In total, two Hungarian athletes participated in the speed skating events – Zsolt Baló in the men's 500 m, the men's 1,000 m and the men's 1,500 m and Krisztina Egyed in the women's 500 m, the women's 1,000 m and the women's 1,500 m.

The men's 500 m took place on 9 and 10 February 1998. Baló completed the first race in a time of 38.48 seconds and the second race in a time of 38.08 seconds for a combined time of one minute 16.56 seconds to finish 37th overall.

The men's 1,500 m took place on 12 February 1998. Baló completed the course in a time of one minute 55.52 seconds to finish 42nd overall.

The women's 500 m took place on 13 and 14 February 1998. Egyed completed the first race in a time of 41.2 seconds and the second race in a time of 41.41 seconds for a combined time of one minute 22.61 seconds to finish 32nd overall.

The men's 1,000 m took place on 15 February 1998. Baló completed the course in a time of one minute 15.87 seconds to finish 42nd overall.

The women's 1,500 m took place on 16 February 1998. Egyed completed the course in a time of two minutes 5.79 seconds to finish 27th overall.

The women's 1,000 m took place on 19 February 1998. Egyed completed the course in a time of one minute 21.23 seconds to finish 23rd overall.

Event	Athlete	Race 1		Race 2		Total	
Event	Athlete	Time	Rank	Time	Rank	Time	Rank
Men's 500 m	Zsolt Baló	38.48	40	38.08	38	76.56	37
Men's 1,000 m	Zsolt Baló					1:15.87	42
Men's 1,500 m	Zsolt Baló					1:55.52	42
Women's 500 m	Krisztina Egyed	41.20	33	41.41	33	82.61	32
Women's 1,000 m	Krisztina Egyed					1:21.23	23
Women's 1,500 m	Krisztina Egyed					2:05.79	27
