= Alpine skiing at the 1998 Winter Olympics – Women's slalom =

Women's slalom at the XVIII Olympic Winter Games
- Alpine skiing
- Venue: Shiga Kogen
- Date: February 19, 1998
- Competitors: 57 from 27 nations
- Winning time: 1:32.40

Medalists
1st place, gold medalist(s)		Hilde Gerg	Germany
2nd place, silver medalist(s)		Deborah Compagnoni	Italy
3rd place, bronze medalist(s)		Zali Steggall	Australia

The Women's slalom competition of the 1998 Winter Olympic Games was held at Shiga Kogen.

The defending world champion was Deborah Compagnoni of Italy, while Sweden's Pernilla Wiberg was the defending World Cup slalom champion.

== Results ==
Rank	Name	Country	Run 1	Run 2	Total	Difference
1st place, gold medalist(s)	Hilde Gerg	Germany	0:45.89	0:46.51	1:32.40	-
2nd place, silver medalist(s)	Deborah Compagnoni	Italy	0:45.29	0:47.17	1:32.46	+0.06
3rd place, bronze medalist(s)	Zali Steggall	Australia	0:45.96	0:46.71	1:32.67	+0.27
4	Martina Ertl	Germany	0:46.22	0:46.69	1:32.91	+0.51
5	Sabine Egger	Austria	0:45.97	0:47.25	1:33.22	+0.82
6	Ingrid Salvenmoser	Austria	0:46.84	0:46.55	1:33.39	+0.99
7	Martina Accola	Switzerland	0:46.37	0:47.75	1:34.12	+1.72
8	Morena Gallizio	Italy	0:46.93	0:47.94	1:34.87	+2.47
9	Monika Bergmann	Germany	0:47.78	0:47.21	1:34.99	+2.59
10	Anna Ottosson	Sweden	0:47.31	0:47.93	1:35.24	+2.84
11	Nataša Bokal	Slovenia	0:47.72	0:47.87	1:35.59	+3.19
12	Ylva Nowén	Sweden	0:48.07	0:48.26	1:36.33	+3.93
13	Julie Parisien	United States	0:47.91	0:48.44	1:36.35	+3.95
14	María José Rienda Contreras	Spain	0:47.73	0:48.73	1:36.46	+4.06
15	Lara Magoni	Italy	0:48.13	0:48.50	1:36.63	+4.23
16	Alenka Dovžan	Slovenia	0:47.95	0:48.71	1:36.66	+4.26
17	Kazuko Ikeda	Japan	0:47.88	0:49.41	1:37.29	+4.89
18	Tanja Poutiainen	Finland	0:48.06	0:49.45	1:37.51	+5.11
19	Vicky Grau	Andorra	0:48.41	0:49.28	1:37.69	+5.29
20	Junko Yamakawa	Japan	0:48.76	0:49.34	1:38.10	+5.70
21	Diana Fehr	Liechtenstein	0:48.66	0:50.10	1:38.76	+6.36
22	Sarah Schleper	United States	0:49.17	0:50.25	1:39.42	+7.02
23	Tamara Schädler	Liechtenstein	0:49.74	0:50.27	1:40.01	+7.61
24	Kumiko Kashiwagi	Japan	0:49.63	0:50.83	1:40.46	+8.06
25	Carola Calello	Argentina	0:50.52	0:51.04	1:41.56	+9.16
26	Nadezhda Vasileva	Bulgaria	0:52.68	0:52.76	1:45.44	+13.04
27	Mirjana Granzov	FR Yugoslavia	0:52.45	0:54.20	1:46.65	+14.25
-	Leïla Piccard	France	0:46.25	DNF	-	-
-	Karin Roten	Switzerland	0:46.64	DNF	-	-
-	Kristina Koznick	United States	0:46.73	DNF	-	-
-	Urška Hrovat	Slovenia	0:47.02	DNF	-	-
-	Špela Pretnar	Slovenia	0:47.11	DNF	-	-
-	Trine Bakke-Rognmo	Norway	0:47.17	DNF	-	-
-	Henna Raita	Finland	0:47.18	DNF	-	-
-	Mónica Bosch	Spain	0:47.89	DNF	-	-
-	Katerina Tichy	Canada	0:47.93	DNF	-	-
-	Katrine Hvidsteen	Denmark	0:51.10	DNF	-	-
-	Martina Fortkord	Sweden	0:53.25	DNS	-	-
-	Pernilla Wiberg	Sweden	DNF	-	-	-
-	Claudia Riegler	New Zealand	DNF	-	-	-
-	Sonja Nef	Switzerland	DNF	-	-	-
-	Laure Pequegnot	France	DNF	-	-	-
-	Patricia Chauvet	France	DNF	-	-	-
-	Elisabetta Biavaschi	Italy	DNF	-	-	-
-	Andrine Flemmen	Norway	DNF	-	-	-
-	Emma Carrick-Anderson	Great Britain	DNF	-	-	-
-	Trude Gimle	Norway	DNF	-	-	-
-	Janica Kostelić	Croatia	DNF	-	-	-
-	Brynja Þorsteinsdóttir	Iceland	DNF	-	-	-
-	Sigríður Þorláksdóttir	Iceland	DNF	-	-	-
-	Theódóra Mathiesen	Iceland	DNF	-	-	-
-	Lucie Hrstková	Czech Republic	DNF	-	-	-
-	Kinga Barsi	Hungary	DNF	-	-	-
-	Marika Labancz	Hungary	DNF	-	-	-
-	Tasha Nelson	United States	DQ	-	-	-
-	Noriyo Hiroi	Japan	DQ	-	-	-
-	Sofia Akhmeteli	Georgia	DQ	-	-	-
