= Czech Republic at the 1998 Winter Olympics =

- IOC code: CZE
- NOC: Czech Olympic Committee
- Website: www.olympic.cz (in Czech and English)

in Nagano
- Competitors: 61 (48 men, 13 women) in 9 sports
- Flag bearer: Lubomír Buchta (cross-country skiing)
- Medals Ranked 14th: Gold 1 Silver 1 Bronze 1 Total 3

Winter Olympics appearances (overview)
- 1994; 1998; 2002; 2006; 2010; 2014; 2018; 2022; 2026

Other related appearances
- Czechoslovakia (1924–1992)

The Czech Republic was represented at the 1998 Winter Olympics in Nagano, Japan by the Czech Olympic Committee.

In total, 61 athletes including 48 men and 13 women represented the Czech Republic in nine different sports including alpine skiing, biathlon, bobsleigh, cross-country skiing, figure skating, freestyle skiing, ice hockey, Nordic combined and ski jumping.

The Czech Republic won three medals at the games after Kateřina Neumannová claimed silver and bronze in the cross-country skiing and the men's team claimed gold in the ice hockey.

== Competitors ==
In total, 61 athletes represented the Czech Republic at the 1998 Winter Olympics in Nagano, Japan across nine different sports.

Sport	Men	Women	Total
Alpine skiing	1	1	2
Biathlon	4	4	8
Bobsleigh	5	–	5
Cross-country skiing	5	5	10
Figure skating	2	3	5
Freestyle skiing	1	0	1
Ice hockey	21	0	21
Nordic combined	5	–	5
Ski jumping	4	–	4
Total	48	13	61

== Medalists ==
The Czech Republic won a total of three medals at the games including one gold, one silver and one bronze.

Medal	Name	Sport	Event	Date
Gold	Czech Republic men's national ice hockey team: Jan Čaloun; Roman Čechmánek; Jiří Dopita; Roman Hamrlík; Dominik Hašek; Milan Hejduk; Milan Hnilička; Jaromír Jágr; František Kučera; Robert Lang; David Moravec; Pavel Patera; Libor Procházka; Martin Procházka; Robert Reichel; Martin Ručinský; Vladimír Růžička; Jiří Šlégr; Richard Šmehlík; Jaroslav Špaček; Martin Straka; Petr Svoboda	Ice hockey	Men's tournament	22 February
Silver	Kateřina Neumannová	Cross-country skiing	Women's 5 kilometre classical	10 February
Bronze	Kateřina Neumannová	Cross-country skiing	Women's 10 kilometre freestyle pursuit	12 February

== Alpine skiing ==
In total, two Czech athletes participated in the alpine skiing events – Lucie Hrstková in the women's downhill, the women's super-G, the women's giant slalom, the women's slalom and the women's combined and Marcel Maxa in the men's giant slalom, the men's slalom and the men's combined.

Athlete	Event	Race 1	Race 2	Total	
Athlete	Event	Time	Time	Time	Rank
Marcel Maxa	Men's giant slalom	1:25.88	1:23.63	2:49.51	29
Marcel Maxa	Men's slalom	57.81	DNF	DNF	–
Lucie Hrstková	Women's downhill			1:33.00	31
Lucie Hrstková	Women's super-G			1:21.74	35
Lucie Hrstková	women's giant slalom	DNF	–	DNF	–
Lucie Hrstková	women's slalom	DNF	–	DNF	–

Athlete	Event	Slalom		Downhill	Total	
Athlete	Event	Time 1	Time 2	Time	Total time	Rank
Marcel Maxa	Men's	49.73	46.44	DSQ	DSQ	–
Lucie Hrstková	Women's	1:33.29	39.30	37.37	2:49.96	15

== Biathlon ==
In total, eight Czech athletes participated in the biathlon events – Jiřína Pelcová, Petr Garabík, Eva Háková, Jiří Holubec, Kateřina Losmanová, Ivan Masařík, Irena Novotná, Zdeněk Vítek.

Event	Athlete	Misses ^{1}	Time	Rank
Men's 10 km Sprint	Petr Garabík	3	30:51.3	53
Men's 10 km Sprint	Zdeněk Vítek	2	30:46.5	51
Men's 10 km Sprint	Ivan Masařík	2	28:58.6	15

Event	Athlete	Time	Misses	Adjusted time ^{2}	Rank
Men's 20 km	Petr Garabík	58:28.8	6	1'04:28.8	56
Men's 20 km	Jiří Holubec	59:08.8	2	1'01:08.8	34
Men's 20 km	Ivan Masařík	56:30.7	1	57:30.7	4

Event	Athletes	Race		
Event	Athletes	Misses ^{1}	Time	Rank
Men's 4 x 7.5 km relay	Petr Garabík; Zdeněk Vítek; Jiří Holubec; Ivan Masařík	0	1'26:35.5	14

Event	Athlete	Misses ^{1}	Time	Rank
Women's 7.5 km Sprint	Kateřina Losmanová	3	26:51.7	57
Women's 7.5 km Sprint	Irena Novotná	3	25:30.4	40
Women's 7.5 km Sprint	Jiřína Pelcová	1	25:14.5	35
Women's 7.5 km Sprint	Eva Háková	1	24:58.6	26

Event	Athlete	Time	Misses	Adjusted time ^{2}	Rank
Women's 15 km	Eva Háková	57:25.4	6	1'03:25.4	53
Women's 15 km	Kateřina Losmanová	1'00:48.9	1	1'01:48.9	44
Women's 15 km	Jiřína Pelcová	58:26.3	3	1'01:26.3	38
Women's 15 km	Irena Novotná	57:09.0	3	1'00:09.0	30

Event	Athletes	Race		
Event	Athletes	Misses ^{1}	Time	Rank
Women's 4 x 7.5 km relay	Kateřina Losmanová; Irena Novotná; Jiřína Pelcová; Eva Háková	0	1'43:20.5	6

^{1} A penalty loop of 150 metres had to be skied per missed target.
^{2} One minute added per missed target.

== Bobsleigh ==
In total, five Czech athletes participated in the bobsleigh events – Jiří Dzmura, Jan Kobián, Peter Kondrát, Pavel Polomský and Pavel Puškár.

Sled	Athletes	Event	Run 1		Run 2		Run 3		Run 4		Total	
Sled	Athletes	Event	Time	Rank	Time	Rank	Time	Rank	Time	Rank	Time	Rank
CZE-1	Jiří Dzmura; Pavel Polomský	Two-man	55.30	16	55.11	17	DNF	–	–	–	DNF	–
CZE-2	Pavel Puškár; Jan Kobián	Two-man	54.99	12	54.60	5	54.46	8	54.54	7	3:38.59	8
CZE-1	Pavel Puškár; Peter Kondrát; Pavel Polomský; Jan Kobián	Four-man	53.61	12	53.80	16	53.88	11	–		2:41.29	13

== Cross-country skiing ==
In total, 10 Czech athletes participated in the cross-country skiing events – Lukáš Bauer, Lubomír Buchta, Kateřina Hanušová, Zuzana Kocumová, Martin Koukal, Jiří Magál, Petr Michl, Kateřina Neumannová, Jana Šaldová and Iveta Zelingerová-Fortová.

Event	Athlete	Race	
Event	Athlete	Time	Rank
Men's 10 km C	Lubomír Buchta	30:38.4	52
Men's 10 km C	Lukáš Bauer	30:11.1	45
Men's 10 km C	Martin Koukal	29:41.8	35
Men's 10 km C	Petr Michl	29:28.5	32
Men's 15 km pursuit^{1} F	Lubomír Buchta	45:36.6	50
Men's 15 km pursuit^{1} F	Martin Koukal	44:41.8	37
Men's 15 km pursuit^{1} F	Lukáš Bauer	44:16.3	32
Men's 15 km pursuit^{1} F	Petr Michl	42:47.5	23
Men's 30 km C	Lubomír Buchta	DNF	–
Men's 30 km C	Lukáš Bauer	1'42:08.8	33
Men's 30 km C	Jiří Magál	1'40:29.6	22
Men's 50 km F	Jiří Magál	2'21:30.5	47
Men's 50 km F	Petr Michl	2'13:08.3	17
Men's 50 km F	Lubomír Buchta	2'11:34.8	13
Men's 4 × 10 km relay	Lukáš Bauer; Martin Koukal; Petr Michl; Jiří Magál	1'45:35.4	15
Women's 5 km C	Zuzana Kocumová	19:58.3	59
Women's 5 km C	Jana Šaldová	19:00.4	28
Women's 5 km C	Kateřina Hanušová	18:49.1	22
Women's 5 km C	Kateřina Neumannová	17:42.7	2nd place, silver medalist(s)
Women's 10 km pursuit^{2} F	Zuzana Kocumová	32:34.9	41
Women's 10 km pursuit^{2} F	Kateřina Hanušová	30:58.8	24
Women's 10 km pursuit^{2} F	Kateřina Neumannová	28:37.2	3rd place, bronze medalist(s)
Women's 15 km C	Iveta Zelingerová-Fortová	52:26.3	44
Women's 15 km C	Jana Šaldová	51:33.8	29
Women's 15 km C	Kateřina Neumannová	49:01.9	9
Women's 30 km F	Zuzana Kocumová	1'32:52.1	35
Women's 30 km F	Kateřina Hanušová	1'29:59.9	23
Women's 4 × 5 km relay	Jana Šaldová; Kateřina Neumannová; Kateřina Hanušová; Zuzana Kocumová	56:58.7	6

== Figure skating ==
In total, five Czech athletes participated in the figure skating events – Lenka Kulovaná in the women's singles, Kateřina Beránková and Otto Dlabola in the pairs and Kateřina Mrázová and Martin Šimeček in the ice dance.

Athlete	Event	SP	FS	TFP	Rank
Lenka Kulovaná	Women's singles	16	18	26.0	18
Kateřina Beránková; Otto Dlabola	pairs	14	15	22.0	15

Athletes	CD1	CD2	OD	FD	TFP	Rank
Kateřina Mrázová; Martin Šimeček	13	13	13	13	26.0	13

== Freestyle skiing ==
In total, one Czech athlete participated in the freestyle skiing events – Aleš Valenta in the men's aerials.

Athlete	Event	Qualification		Final	
Athlete	Event	Points	Rank	Points	Rank
Aleš Valenta	Men's aerials	205.50	11 Q	232.25	4

== Ice hockey ==
In total, 21 Czech athletes participated in the ice hockey events – Josef Beránek, Jan Čaloun, Roman Čechmánek, Jiří Dopita, Roman Hamrlík, Dominik Hašek, Milan Hejduk, Milan Hnilička, Jaromír Jágr, František Kučera, Robert Lang, David Moravec, Pavel Patera, Libor Procházka, Martin Procházka, Robert Reichel, Martin Ručinský, Vladimír Růžička, Jiří Šlégr, Richard Šmehlík, Jaroslav Špaček, Martin Straka and Petr Svoboda in the men's competition.

After defeating Russia 1–0 in the gold medal match, the Czech Republic won the competition for the first time.

Pos	Team	Pld	W	D	L	GF	GA	GD	Pts	Qualification
1	Russia	3	3	0	0	15	6	+9	6	Quarterfinals
2	Czech Republic	3	2	0	1	12	4	+8	4	Quarterfinals
3	Finland	3	1	0	2	11	9	+2	2	Quarterfinals
4	Kazakhstan	3	0	0	3	6	25	−19	0	Quarterfinals

Source: Olympedia

Team 1	Score	Team 2
Czech Republic	3–0	Finland
Czech Republic	8–2	Kazakhstan
Czech Republic	1–2	Russia

Quarter-final

Team 1	Score	Team 2
Czech Republic	4–1	United States

Semi-final

Team 1	Score	Team 2
Canada	1–2	Czech Republic

Gold medal match

Team 1	Score	Team 2
Czech Republic	1–0	Russia

== Nordic combined ==
In total, five Czech athletes participated in the Nordic combined events – Marek Fiurášek, Milan Kučera, Jan Matura, Ladislav Rygl and Petr Šmejc.

Athlete	Event	Ski Jumping		Cross-country time	Total rank
Athlete	Event	Points	Rank	Cross-country time	Total rank
Petr Šmejc	Individual	195.0	34	48:37.4	40
Ladislav Rygl	Individual	204.5	23	44:20.8	14
Jan Matura	Individual	218.0	12	47:35.0	35
Milan Kučera	Individual	228.0	8	42:45.8	5

Athletes	Event	Ski jumping		Cross-country time	Total rank
Athletes	Event	Points	Rank	Cross-country time	Total rank
Marek Fiurášek; Milan Kučera; Jan Matura; Ladislav Rygl	Team	900.5	4	57:04.7	8

== Ski jumping ==
In total, four Czech athletes participated in the ski jumping events – Michal Doležal, František Jež, Jaroslav Sakala and Jakub Sucháček in the normal hill individual, the large hill individual and the large hill team.

Athlete	Event	Jump 1			Jump 2		Total	
Athlete	Event	Distance	Points	Rank	Distance	Points	Points	Rank
Jakub Sucháček	Normal hill	77.5	87.5	29 Q	81.0	96.0	183.5	28
Jaroslav Sakala	Normal hill	77.5	89.0	28 Q	80.5	96.0	185.0	26
Michal Doležal	Normal hill	81.5	98.5	20 Q	87.5	112.5	211.0	11
František Jež	Normal hill	83.5	103.0	13 Q	77.5	89.5	192.5	24
Jaroslav Sakala	Large hill	91.5	61.2	56	did not advance			
František Jež	Large hill	113.5	104.3	25 Q	113.0	104.4	208.7	24
Michal Doležal	Large hill	116.0	107.8	18 Q	130.5	135.4	243.2	8
Jakub Sucháček	Large hill	117.5	111.0	13 Q	121.0	118.3	229.3	15

Athletes	Result	
Athletes	Points	Rank
Jakub Sucháček; František Jež; Michal Doležal; Jaroslav Sakala	710.3	7
