= Czech Republic at the 1994 Winter Olympics =

- IOC code: CZE
- NOC: Czech Olympic Committee
- Website: www.olympic.cz (in Czech and English)

in Lillehammer
- Competitors: 63 (47 men and 16 women) in 7 sports
- Flag bearer: Pavel Benc (cross-country skiing)
- Medals: Gold 0 Silver 0 Bronze 0 Total 0

Winter Olympics appearances (overview)
- 1994; 1998; 2002; 2006; 2010; 2014; 2018; 2022; 2026

Other related appearances
- Czechoslovakia (1924–1992)

The Czech Republic competed at the 1994 Winter Olympics in Lillehammer, Norway. It was the first Winter Games since the dissolution of Czechoslovakia, and so the Czech Republic and Slovakia competed as independent teams.

Cross-country skier Pavel Benc was the flag-bearer of the country in the opening ceremony – he thus had a chance to lead the last Winter Olympic Czechoslovak team in Albertville and the first ever Czech team in Lillehammer.

Although the three medals won by Czechoslovakia in Albertville in 1992 were all won by Czech athletes (the ice hockey team had also three Slovaks), the result of Lillehammer Olympics were less satisfying as fifth places of ice hockey and Nordic combined teams were the Czech Republic's best results. It can be explained with the growth of competition as the former Soviet Union countries entered their athletes (only Lithuania, Latvia and Estonia participated in the 1992 Winter Olympics besides the Unified Team).

== Competitors ==
The following is the list of number of competitors in the Games.

Sport	Men	Women	Total
Biathlon	4	6	10
Bobsleigh	4	–	4
Cross-country skiing	6	5	11
Figure skating	3	5	8
Ice hockey	22	–	22
Nordic combined	4	–	4
Ski jumping	4	–	4
Total	47	16	63

== Biathlon ==
Men

Athlete	Event	Final		
Athlete	Event	Time	Pen.	Rank
Petr Garabík	10 km Sprint	30:31.2	1	21
Petr Garabík	20 km Individual	59:48.9	1	11
Jiří Holubec	10 km Sprint	30:45.2	2	29
Jiří Holubec	20 km Individual	1:00:18.9	1	17
Tomáš Kos	10 km Sprint	31:52.0	1	46
Ivan Masařík	20 km Individual	1:01:46.0	3	34
Petr Garabík; Tomáš Kos; Ivan Masařík; Jiří Holubec	4 × 7.5 km Relay	1:35:26.0	0	12

Women

Athlete	Event	Final		
Athlete	Event	Time	Pen.	Rank
Irena Novotná	15 km Individual	59:29.0	4	50
Eva Háková	7.5 km Sprint	26:48.2	1	9
Eva Háková	15 km Individual	57:43.2	6	35
Iveta Knížková	7.5 km Sprint	28:18.3	3	34
Iveta Knížková	15 km Individual	57:23.7	6	34
Jiřína Pelcová	7.5 km Sprint	29:23.0	3	49
Jiřína Pelcová	15 km Individual	58:07.3	3	37
Gabriela Suvová	7.5 km Sprint	30:25.8	4	63
Jana Kulhavá; Jiřína Pelcová; Iveta Knížková; Eva Háková	4 × 7.5 km Relay	1:57:00.8	3	7

== Bobsleigh ==
Jiří Džmura and Pavel Polomský became most successful Czech bobsledders in Lillehammer Olympic Bobsleigh and Luge Track. They finished fifth in the first run of two-men bobsleigh competition, falling slowly in the results to eventually finish in seventh tied with Canada's Pierre Lueders. In the four-men competition, the Czech team went through the competition in the opposite manner – starting 14th and moving up step by step to the 10th-place finish with a fifth best fourth run.

Athlete	Event	Final					
Athlete	Event	Run 1	Run 2	Run 3	Run 4	Total	Rank
Jiří Dzmura; Pavel Polomský	Two-man	52.66	53.18	53.02	53.32	3:32.18	7
Pavel Puškár; Jan Kobián	Two-man	53.44	53.42	53.54	53.85	3:34.25	20
Jiří Dzmura; Pavel Puškár; Pavel Polomský; Jan Kobián	Four-man	52.35	52.45	52.31	52.40	3:29.51	10

== Cross-country skiing ==
Kateřina Neumannová presented a huge leap in form since last Olympics, finishing only 13 seconds behind podium in 5 km classical and moving up to sixth place in the pursuit. She recorded the second best time on her third leg of women's relay (losing only to Russia's Nina Gavrilyuk) and had the leading role in the ninth-place finish of the Czech relay team as other women had 11th to 13th times in their respective legs.

Men participated with almost the same squad like in Albertville, but their performances were far worse than in French Alps.

Men

Athlete	Event	Final					
Athlete	Event	Start	Rank	Time	Rank	Total	Rank
Pavel Benc	10 km Classical					27:38.6	65
Pavel Benc	15 km Free Pursuit	+03:18	65	38:06.1	18	+5:35.3	36
Pavel Benc	30 km Free					1:18:49.5	25
Lubomír Buchta	10 km Classical					26:17.6	26
Lubomír Buchta	15 km Free Pursuit	+01:57	26	38:37.0	33	+4:45.2	24
Lubomír Buchta	50 km Classical					2:14:50.0	20
Václav Korunka	10 km Classical					27:22.8	59
Václav Korunka	15 km Free Pursuit	+03:02	59	38:40.0	34	+5:53.2	37
Martin Petrásek	10 km Classical					28:10.0	71
Martin Petrásek	15 km Free Pursuit	+03:50	71	40:13.8	53	+8:15.0	58
Martin Petrásek	50 km Classical					DNF	
Jiří Teplý	30 km Free					1:17:37.8	17
Ondrej Valenta	30 km Free					1:20:04.1	34
Ondrej Valenta	50 km Classical					2:26:08.6	58
Lubomír Buchta; Václav Korunka; Jiří Teplý; Pavel Benc	4 × 10 km Relay					1:47:12.6	8

Women

Athlete	Event	Final					
Athlete	Event	Start	Rank	Time	Rank	Total	Rank
Lucie Chroustovská	15 km Free					47:37.8	48
Lucie Chroustovská	30 km Classical					1:36:07.8	39
Kateřina Neumannová	5 km Classical					14:49.6	8
Kateřina Neumannová	10 km Free Pursuit	+00:41	8	28:00.8	6	+1:11.7	6
Kateřina Neumannová	15 km Free					43:25.1	14
Jana Rázlová	5 km Classical					16:39.7	55
Jana Rázlová	10 km Free Pursuit	+02:31	55	33:07.8	52	+8:08.7	52
Jana Rázlová	30 km Classical					1:36:40.9	42
Martina Vondrová	5 km Classical					16:27.3	47
Martina Vondrová	10 km Free Pursuit	+02:19	47	31:24.9	42	+6:13.8	44
Martina Vondrová	15 km Free					45:29.1	31
Martina Vondrová	30 km Classical					1:34:50.1	36
Iveta Zelingerová	5 km Classical					16:15.6	43
Iveta Zelingerová	10 km Free Pursuit	+02:07	43	30:25.2	31	+5:02.1	33
Iveta Zelingerová	15 km Free					46:56.3	41
Iveta Zelingerová	30 km Classical					DNF	
Martina Vondrová; Iveta Zelingerová; Kateřina Neumannová; Lucie Chroustovská	4 × 5 km Relay					1:02:02.1	9

== Figure skating ==
Radka Kovaříková and René Novotný were fourth in the 1992 Winter Olympics and in 1994 they recorded their fourth consecutive fourth place in the European Championships. Two great pairs-champions however returned this season and were great favorites, which was confirmed as 1988 Olympic champions Ekaterina Gordeeva and Sergei Grinkov beat 1992 Olympic champions Nataliya Mishkutenok and Artur Dmitriev. The Czech couple was not able to fight for a medal in such competition. It finished fifth in the short program, but fell down to sixth in a free program behind United States' Jenni Meno and Todd Sand. The next year Kovaříková and Novotný however won the Figure Skating World Championships and turned professionals. Kateřina Mrázová and Martin Šimeček recorded their best Olympic finish in ice dancing competition in eighth place in a competition crowned by Jayne Torvill and Christopher Dean comeback to the Olympics, 10 years after their revolutionary Bolero.

Women

Athlete	Final				
Athlete	Short Program	Rank	Free Skating	Total	Rank
Lenka Kulovaná	5.5	11	14.0	19.5	13
Irena Zemanová	13.5	27	did not advance		

Pairs

Athlete	Final				
Athlete	Short Program	Rank	Free Skating	Total	Rank
Radka Kovaříková; René Novotný	2.5	5	6.0	8.5	6

Ice Dancing

Athlete	Final								
Athlete	Compulsory Dance 1	Rank	Compulsory Dance 2	Rank	Original Dance	Rank	Free Dance	Total	Rank
Radmila Chroboková; Milan Brzý	3.2	16	3.2	16	9.6	16	16.0	32.0	16
Kateřina Mrázová; Martin Šimeček	1.6	8	1.6	8	4.8	8	8.0	16.0	8

== Ice hockey ==
Czech Republic arrived to Lillehammer as the unbeaten winner of the recent Globen Cup, the Swedish part of the European Hockey Tour. The Olympic tournament however had a rather different result. Finland, at the start of the tournament not supposed to be a favorite, was in the lead since the fifth minute power play goal, following three games added the compulsory victories but only win over Germany coached by Luděk Bukač was supported by a good play. The team was not able to beat any of the strong European team and lost to Russia 3-4 to leave it in fourth place in group but to finish only third behind Finland, which hammered Russia, and Germany.

The standings in the other group set a tie against Canada in the quarterfinals. The Czechs lead twice in the game and Canada scores the tying goal five minutes to the end of regulation. In the overtime, Paul Kariya scored the sudden-death power-play goal (Horák served the penalty). The Czechs had to settle with the 5-8th places classification games and avoided surprise beating United States 5-3 after losing to them 0-2 early in the first period. The 5th to 6th place game was the first confrontation of former compatriots, but Slovakia was overmotivated and outplayed 7-1 (the game was decided in the first period, despite losing 0-1 in third minute, the Czechs won it 5-1).

Canada eliminated Czech Republic also in the 1994 World Championships; the two 5th-place finishes forced Ivan Hlinka to withdraw. His successor Luděk Bukač then leads Czech Republic to the 1996 World Championships title, first since 1985 and first of four titles in six years.

- Squad:
  - Goalkeepers: Petr Bříza, Roman Turek, Jaroslav Kameš
  - Defenders: Drahomír Kadlec, Jan Vopat, Bedřich Ščerban, Antonín Stavjaňa, Jiří Vykoukal, Miloslav Hořava, Jiří Veber
  - Forwards: Otakar Janecký, Jiří Kučera, Jiří Doležal, Tomáš Sršeň, Martin Hosták, Kamil Kašťák, Pavel Geffert, Petr Hrbek, Richard Žemlička, Jan Alinč, Radek Ťoupal, Roman Horak, Tomáš Kapusta
  - Coaches: Ivan Hlinka, Stanislav Neveselý

Results

Stage	Opponent	Result	Points	Rank
Group Stage	Finland	1-3		
Group Stage	Austria	7-3		
Group Stage	Germany	1-0		
Group Stage	Norway	4-1		
Group Stage	Russia	3-4		
Group Stage		16-11	6	3
Quarterfinal	Canada	2-3		
Placement Round 5-8	United States	5-3		
5th Place Match	Slovakia	7-1		5

== Nordic combined ==
The team competition brought a surprising result for the Czech Republic which eventually occurred to be one of the biggest successes of the whole Olympic team. Zbyněk Pánek, Milan Kučera and František Máka all had one good and one worse jump in the ski-jumping competition (Pánek and Kučera were better in the first round, Máka, who was better cross-country skier, bettered his result in the second round). The Czechs started the cross-country relay in sixth place, 10:50 minutes behind sovereign Japanese jumpers.

The relay was not a dramatic one, as no change happened from first to fourth place, Zbyněk Pánek moved the Czechs past Austria to fifth place already in the first leg. Milan Kučera held the place despite his worst cross-country performance and František Máka brought the relay home in fifth ahead of fast-finishing France.

Athlete	Event	First round		Second round			Cross-country				
Athlete	Event	Points	Rank	Points	Total	Rank	Start	Time	Rank	Total	Rank
Miroslav Kopal	Individual event	80.0	48	85.0	165.0	48	+09:06	DNF			
Milan Kučera	Individual event	102.5	17	91.5	194.0	24	+05:53	41:29.5	36	47:22.5	31
František Máka	Individual event	99.5	24	102.0	201.5	17	+05:03	40:23.2	22	45:26.2	18
Zbyněk Pánek	Individual event	89.5	41	81.5	171.0	41	+08:26	38:58.0	5	47:24.0	34
Zbyněk Pánek; Milan Kučera; František Máka	Team event	306.0	6	297.5	603.5	6	+10:50	1:24:05.9	6	1:34:55.9	5

== Ski jumping ==
Two-time team Olympic medalist Jiří Parma was below par in Lillehammer and thus only Jaroslav Sakala managed to record a good individual result in Lillehammer, finishing seventh in large hill competition, but he did not improve in the next two competitions. In the team competition Parma was the weakest member of the team as Zbyněk Krompolc surprisingly recorded best results of the whole team.

Athlete	Event	First Round		Final		
Athlete	Event	Points	Rank	Points	Total	Rank
Ladislav Dluhoš	Large hill	67.4	38	74.4	141.8	30
Ladislav Dluhoš	Normal hill	108.5	31	DSQ		
Zbyněk Krompolc	Large hill	90.2	24	61.2	151.4	29
Zbyněk Krompolc	Normal hill	106.0	35	83.5	189.5	36
Jiří Parma	Large hill	88.1	25	36.6	124.7	39
Jiří Parma	Normal hill	118.0	18	108.5	226.5	19
Jaroslav Sakala	Large hill	113.1	9	108.9	222.0	7
Jaroslav Sakala	Normal hill	109.0	30	126.0	235.0	13
Zbyněk Krompolc; Jaroslav Sakala; Ladislav Dluhoš; Jiří Parma	Team Large Hill	401.9	8	398.8	800.7	7
