= 2000 Alpine Skiing World Cup – Men's slalom =

2000 Men's slalom World Cup
Previous: 1999	Next: 2001

Men's giant slalom World Cup 1999/2000

== Final point standings ==
In men's slalom World Cup 1999/2000 the all results count.

Place	Name	Country	Total points	2 (United States)	8 (Italy)	12 (Slovenia)	15 (France)	18 (Switzerland)	21 (Austria)	25 (Germany)	28 (Switzerland)	30 (South Korea)	35 (Austria)	40 (Italy)
1	Kjetil André Aamodt	Norway	598	60	32	22	80	100	36	80	80	18	50	40
2	Ole Kristian Furuseth	Norway	544	-	26	-	50	80	50	60	18	80	80	100
3	Matjaž Vrhovnik	Slovenia	538	26	40	40	60	50	80	45	100	15	22	60
4	Mario Matt	Austria	384	-	-	14	-	-	100	50	60	60	100	-
5	Thomas Stangassinger	Austria	369	80	60	60	36	6	45	22	-	-	60	-
6	Benjamin Raich	Austria	368	-	80	80	32	-	60	36	-	-	-	80
7	Rainer Schönfelder	Austria	307	20	29	29	15	40	18	100	-	24	-	32
8	Didier Plaschy	Switzerland	281	100	-	100	-	-	-	-	-	36	-	45
9	Hans Petter Buraas	Norway	261	45	-	20	-	22	-	29	50	-	45	50
10	Jure Košir	Slovenia	238	15	45	36	8	29	12	24	40	7	-	22
11	Angelo Weiss	Italy	237	-	36	-	100	36	-	20	16	-	-	29
12	Mitja Kunc	Slovenia	232	-	9	24	45	24	16	-	-	100	14	-
13	Sébastien Amiez	France	190	32	-	-	-	7	-	32	45	22	32	20
14	Kilian Albrecht	Austria	189	9	5	-	9	9	29	12	24	26	40	26
15	Finn Christian Jagge	Norway	180	11	100	-	-	15	9	26	-	10	9	-
16	Markus Eberle	Germany	176	36	20	18	-	16	22	40	-	-	-	24
17	Kalle Palander	Finland	172	24	18	16	-	-	-	4	29	45	-	36
18	Mario Reiter	Austria	155	-	22	15	10	-	13	16	-	50	29	-
19	Matteo Nana	Italy	137	60	10	6	-	-	32	11	11	-	7	-
20	Marco Casanova	Switzerland	136	8	6	8	20	-	-	14	32	6	24	18
21	Johan Brolenius	Sweden	124	-	-	11	29	8	26	7	20	3	20	-
22	Kristinn Björnsson	Iceland	123	29	-	50	24	-	-	7	-	-	13	-
23	Michael Walchhofer	Austria	120	16	-	-	16	18	-	-	22	32	-	16
24	Christian Mayer	Austria	107	24	-	45	6	-	24	-	-	-	8	-
25	Andrzej Bachleda	Poland	100	-	-	10	12	45	-	15	-	-	18	-
	Harald C. Strand Nilsen	Norway	100	-	-	36	40	-	-	-	-	12	12	-
27	Sergio Bergamelli	Italy	89	-	-	13	7	32	15	9	-	13	-	-
28	Drago Grubelnik	Slovenia	86	6	-	12	-	60	-	8	-	-	-	-
29	Mika Marila	Finland	81	40	13	-	14	14	-	-	-	-	-	-
30	Kentaro Minagawa	Japan	80	-	-	-	-	-	40	-	-	40	-	-
31	Michael von Grünigen	Switzerland	79	4	-	-	13	10	8	18	26	-	-	-
32	Joël Chenal	France	76	14	11	-	22	-	-	-	-	-	29	-
33	Giorgio Rocca	Italy	70	-	24	26	-	-	-	-	-	9	11	-
34	Tom Stiansen	Norway	63	13	50	-	-	-	-	-	-	-	-	-
35	Paul Accola	Switzerland	62	18	7	-	-	12	-	13	12	-	-	-
36	Andrej Miklavc	Slovenia	60	10	16	-	5	-	-	-	14	-	15	-
37	Mitja Valenčič	Slovenia	58	12	-	-	-	-	20	-	10	16	-	-
38	Ronald Stampfer	Austria	56	-	-	-	-	-	-	-	-	20	36	-
39	Fabrizio Tescari	Italy	53	-	8	-	26	-	14	5	-	-	-	-
40	Uroš Pavlovčič	Slovenia	52	-	-	-	-	5	11	-	36	-	-	-
41	Erik Schlopy	United States	44	-	-	-	-	-	-	-	15	29	-	-
42	Sacha Gros	United States	41	-	15	-	-	26	-	-	-	-	-	-
43	Urs Imboden	Switzerland	36	5	-	-	11	20	-	-	-	-	-	-
44	Pierre Violon	France	35	-	-	9	-	-	10	-	-	-	16	-
45	François Simond	France	27	-	-	-	-	-	-	-	13	4	10	-
46	Markus Ganahl	Liechtenstein	26	-	-	7	-	11	-	-	-	8	-	-
47	Kiminobu Kimura	Japan	23	-	12	-	-	-	-	-	-	11	-	-
48	Martin Hansson	Sweden	22	-	4	-	18	-	-	-	-	-	-	-
49	Heinz Schilchegger	Austria	18	-	-	-	4	-	-	-	-	14	-	-
50	Florian Seer	Austria	15	-	-	-	-	-	-	10	-	5	-	-
51	Lasse Kjus	Norway	14	-	14	-	-	-	-	-	-	-	-	-
52	Gaku Hirasawa	Japan	13	-	-	-	-	13	-	-	-	-	-	-
53	Richard Gravier	France	7	7	-	-	-	-	-	-	-	-	-	-
	Fredrik Nyberg	Sweden	7	-	-	-	-	-	7	-	-	-	-	-

Alpine Skiing World Cup
Men

Overall | Downhill | Super G | Giant slalom | Slalom | Combined

2000
