= Alpine skiing at the 1998 Winter Olympics – Women's giant slalom =

Women's giant slalom at the XVIII Olympic Winter Games
- Alpine skiing
- Venue: Shiga Kogen
- Date: February 20, 1998
- Competitors: 56 from 25 nations
- Winning time: 2:50.59

Medalists
1st place, gold medalist(s)		Deborah Compagnoni	Italy
2nd place, silver medalist(s)		Alexandra Meissnitzer	Austria
3rd place, bronze medalist(s)		Katja Seizinger	Germany

The Women's giant slalom competition of the Nagano 1998 Olympics was held at Shiga Kogen.

The defending world champion was Deborah Compagnoni of Italy, who was also the defending World Cup giant slalom champion.

== Results ==
Rank	Name	Country	Run 1	Run 2	Total	Difference
1st place, gold medalist(s)	Deborah Compagnoni	Italy	1:18.94	1:31.65	2:50.59	-
2nd place, silver medalist(s)	Alexandra Meissnitzer	Austria	1:20.13	1:32.26	2:52.39	+1.80
3rd place, bronze medalist(s)	Katja Seizinger	Germany	1:20.19	1:32.42	2:52.61	+2.02
4	Martina Ertl-Renz	Germany	1:20.38	1:32.34	2:52.72	+2.13
5	Sophie Lefranc-Duvillard	France	1:19.88	1:33.39	2:53.27	+2.68
6	Heidi Zurbriggen	Switzerland	1:20.31	1:33.30	2:53.61	+3.02
7	Anna Ottosson	Sweden	1:20.48	1:33.33	2:53.81	+3.22
8	Sabina Panzanini	Italy	1:20.97	1:33.12	2:54.09	+3.50
9	Birgit Heeb-Batliner	Liechtenstein	1:21.27	1:33.43	2:54.70	+4.11
10	Andrine Flemmen	Norway	1:20.04	1:34.90	2:54.94	+4.35
11	Pernilla Wiberg	Sweden	1:21.48	1:33.92	2:55.40	+4.81
12	María José Rienda	Spain	1:21.57	1:33.97	2:55.54	+4.95
13	Hilde Gerg	Germany	1:21.45	1:34.44	2:55.89	+5.30
14	Martina Fortkord	Sweden	1:21.99	1:34.36	2:56.35	+5.76
15	Steffi Schuster	Austria	1:21.40	1:35.01	2:56.41	+5.82
16	Karin Roten	Switzerland	1:20.91	1:36.05	2:56.96	+6.37
17	Alenka Dovžan	Slovenia	1:22.57	1:34.78	2:57.35	+6.76
18	Urška Hrovat	Slovenia	1:21.61	1:35.83	2:57.44	+6.85
19	Catherine Borghi	Switzerland	1:21.90	1:36.52	2:58.42	+7.83
20	Nataša Bokal	Slovenia	1:22.86	1:35.60	2:58.46	+7.87
20	Christiane Mitterwallner	Austria	1:23.10	1:35.36	2:58.46	+7.87
22	Kristine Kristiansen	Norway	1:23.04	1:35.67	2:58.71	+8.12
23	Karen Putzer	Italy	1:22.15	1:36.89	2:59.04	+8.45
24	Janica Kostelić	Croatia	1:23.45	1:35.94	2:59.39	+8.80
25	Kazuko Ikeda	Japan	1:23.06	1:37.65	3:00.71	+10.12
26	Tanja Poutiainen	Finland	1:24.90	1:36.76	3:01.66	+11.07
27	Kumiko Kashiwagi	Japan	1:26.33	1:35.58	3:01.91	+11.32
28	Julie Parisien	United States	1:25.34	1:37.44	3:02.78	+12.19
29	Junko Yamakawa	Japan	1:24.93	1:39.02	3:03.95	+13.36
30	Regina Häusl	Germany	1:26.37	1:38.20	3:04.57	+13.98
31	Ilze Ābola	Latvia	1:30.66	1:43.84	3:14.50	+23.91
32	Mónika Kovács	Hungary	1:30.73	1:44.83	3:15.56	+24.97
33	Jana Nikolovska	Macedonia	1:38.14	1:51.83	3:29.97	+39.38
34	Sofia Mystrioti	Greece	1:39.76	1:52.44	3:32.20	+41.61
-	Sarah Schleper	United States	1:23.63	DNF	-	-
-	Alex Shaffer	United States	1:25.02	DNF	-	-
-	Sonja Nef	Switzerland	DNF	-	-	-
-	Leïla Piccard	France	DNF	-	-	-
-	Ana Galindo	Spain	DNF	-	-	-
-	Ylva Nowén	Sweden	DNF	-	-	-
-	Špela Pretnar	Slovenia	DNF	-	-	-
-	Ainhoa Ibarra	Spain	DNF	-	-	-
-	Caroline Lalive	United States	DNF	-	-	-
-	Lucie Hrstková	Czech Republic	DNF	-	-	-
-	Tamara Schädler	Liechtenstein	DNF	-	-	-
-	Ingeborg Helen Marken	Norway	DNF	-	-	-
-	Noriyo Hiroi	Japan	DNF	-	-	-
-	Diana Fehr	Liechtenstein	DNF	-	-	-
-	Sophie Ormond	Great Britain	DNF	-	-	-
-	Carola Calello	Argentina	DNF	-	-	-
-	Vicky Grau	Andorra	DNF	-	-	-
-	Theódóra Mathiesen	Iceland	DNF	-	-	-
-	Henna Raita	Finland	DNF	-	-	-
-	Brynja Þorsteinsdóttir	Iceland	DNF	-	-	-
-	Arijana Boras	Bosnia and Herzegovina	DNF	-	-	-
-	Katrine Hvidsteen	Denmark	DNF	-	-	-
