= 2001 Alpine Skiing World Cup – Men's slalom =

2001 Men's slalom World Cup
| Previous: 2000 | Next: 2002 |

Men's giant slalom World Cup 2000/2001

== Final point standings ==
In men's slalom World Cup 2000/2001 the all results count.

| Place | Name | Country | Total points | 3 (United States) | 10 (Italy) | 13 (Italy) | 17 (Switzerland) | 20 (Austria) | 22 (Austria) | 26 (Japan) | 27 (Japan) | 33 (Sweden) |
|---|---|---|---|---|---|---|---|---|---|---|---|---|
| 1 | Benjamin Raich | Austria | 545 | - | - | 45 | 100 | 100 | 100 | 60 | 40 | 100 |
| 2 | Heinz Schilchegger | Austria | 414 | 100 | - | 80 | - | - | 45 | 80 | 80 | 29 |
| 3 | Mario Matt | Austria | 406 | 80 | - | 100 | 60 | - | - | 36 | 50 | 80 |
| 4 | Pierrick Bourgeat | France | 368 | - | 60 | 36 | 22 | 18 | - | 100 | 100 | 32 |
| 5 | Hans Petter Buraas | Norway | 340 | 50 | 100 | - | - | 60 | 80 | 50 | - | - |
| 6 | Jure Košir | Slovenia | 300 | 24 | 32 | 24 | - | 80 | 40 | - | 60 | 40 |
| 7 | Kjetil André Aamodt | Norway | 291 | 60 | 36 | 50 | 29 | 22 | 18 | 40 | 36 | - |
| 8 | Kilian Albrecht | Austria | 247 | - | 80 | - | 45 | 40 | 50 | 32 | - | - |
| 9 | Mitja Kunc | Slovenia | 226 | 36 | - | 18 | 40 | 50 | 60 | - | 22 | - |
| | Rainer Schönfelder | Austria | 226 | 15 | - | 60 | 80 | 45 | - | - | - | 26 |
| 11 | Alain Baxter | United Kingdom | 222 | 10 | 20 | 32 | 36 | 20 | 29 | 13 | 12 | 50 |
| 12 | Florian Seer | Austria | 221 | 29 | 45 | 15 | 50 | - | 16 | 24 | 20 | 22 |
| 13 | Sébastien Amiez | France | 199 | 32 | - | - | 12 | 40 | - | 29 | 26 | 60 |
| 14 | Harald C. Strand Nilsen | Norway | 170 | 5 | 16 | 12 | 15 | 26 | - | 15 | 45 | 36 |
| 15 | Matjaž Vrhovnik | Slovenia | 160 | 45 | 26 | 9 | - | - | 36 | 26 | 18 | - |
| 16 | Ole Kristian Furuseth | Norway | 151 | 15 | - | 29 | 14 | - | 22 | - | 29 | 45 |
| 17 | Michael von Grünigen | Switzerland | 131 | 18 | 24 | 20 | 20 | 5 | 5 | 20 | 24 | - |
| 18 | Kentaro Minagawa | Japan | 118 | - | 40 | - | - | 32 | 26 | - | - | 20 |
| 19 | Urs Imboden | Switzerland | 107 | 45 | - | - | 24 | 14 | - | - | - | 24 |
| 20 | Markus Eberle | Germany | 99 | 14 | - | 26 | - | 11 | 14 | 18 | - | 16 |
| 21 | Erik Schlopy | United States | 90 | 10 | - | - | - | 29 | - | 45 | 6 | - |
| 22 | Kiminobu Kimura | Japan | 85 | - | 50 | 14 | - | - | 5 | 16 | - | - |
| 23 | Lasse Kjus | Norway | 81 | 26 | 12 | - | - | 15 | 10 | - | - | 18 |
| 24 | Michael Walchhofer | Austria | 70 | 22 | - | - | - | 10 | 24 | - | 14 | - |
| 25 | Rene Mlekuž | Slovenia | 65 | - | 18 | - | - | - | 32 | - | 15 | - |
| 26 | Andrej Miklavc | Slovenia | 64 | - | 22 | 12 | - | - | 13 | - | 16 | - |
| 27 | Uroš Pavlovčič | Slovenia | 62 | - | - | - | 18 | 24 | 10 | - | 10 | - |
| 28 | Julien Lizeroux | France | 59 | - | - | 16 | 11 | - | - | - | 32 | - |
| 29 | Giorgio Rocca | Italy | 58 | 11 | - | - | 10 | - | 12 | 14 | 11 | - |
| 30 | Gaetan Llorach | France | 54 | - | - | 40 | - | - | - | - | 14 | - |
| 31 | Kalle Palander | Finland | 48 | - | 29 | - | - | - | - | 11 | 8 | - |
| | Drago Grubelnik | Slovenia | 48 | - | - | 5 | 16 | - | 20 | - | 7 | - |
| 33 | Markus Ganahl | Liechtenstein | 46 | 8 | - | - | - | 16 | - | 22 | - | - |
| 34 | Tom Stiansen | Norway | 44 | 6 | - | 22 | - | 9 | - | 7 | - | - |
| 35 | Christian Mayer | Austria | 39 | 13 | 13 | 7 | - | 6 | - | - | - | - |
| 36 | Johan Brolenius | Sweden | 38 | - | - | - | 26 | - | - | 12 | - | - |
| 37 | Mario Reiter | Austria | 37 | 18 | - | 10 | - | - | - | 9 | - | - |
| 38 | Andrzej Bachleda | Poland | 32 | - | - | - | 32 | - | - | - | - | - |
| 39 | Sergio Bergamelli | Italy | 29 | - | 15 | 6 | - | 8 | - | - | - | - |
| 40 | Ivica Kostelić | Croatia | 25 | - | 10 | - | 7 | - | 8 | - | - | - |
| 41 | Christian Castellano | Italy | 24 | - | - | - | - | - | 7 | 8 | 9 | - |
| 42 | Marco Casanova | Switzerland | 21 | - | - | - | 9 | 12 | - | - | - | - |
| 43 | François Simond | France | 20 | 20 | - | - | - | - | - | - | - | - |
| 44 | Fabrizio Tescari | Italy | 19 | - | 11 | 8 | - | - | - | - | - | - |
| 45 | Manfred Pranger | Austria | 15 | - | - | - | 8 | 7 | - | - | - | - |
| | Didier Plaschy | Switzerland | 15 | - | - | - | - | - | 15 | - | - | - |
| 47 | John Moulder-Brown | United Kingdom | 14 | - | 14 | - | - | - | - | - | - | - |
| 48 | Daniel Défago | Switzerland | 13 | - | - | - | 13 | - | - | - | - | - |
| | Thomas Grandi | Canada | 13 | - | - | - | - | 13 | - | - | - | - |
| 50 | Markus Larsson | Sweden | 13 | 7 | - | - | - | - | 6 | - | - | - |
| 51 | Matteo Nana | Italy | 11 | - | - | 11 | - | - | - | - | - | - |
| | Sacha Gros | United States | 11 | - | - | - | - | - | 11 | - | - | - |
| | Alan Perathoner | Italy | 11 | - | - | - | - | - | - | 11 | - | - |
| 54 | Joël Chenal | France | 4 | 4 | - | - | - | - | - | - | - | - |
| | Massimiliano Blardone | Italy | 4 | - | - | 4 | - | - | - | - | - | - |

Note:

In the last race only the best racers were allowed to compete and only the best 15 finishers were awarded with points.

Alpine Skiing World Cup
Men

Overall | Downhill | Super G | Giant slalom | Slalom | Combined

2001
