= Biathlon at the 1998 Winter Olympics – Women's sprint =

Women's biathlon sprint at the XVIII Olympic Winter Games
- Venue: Nozawa Onsen
- Dates: 15 February 1998
- Competitors: 64 from 24 nations
- Winning time: 23:08.0

Medalists
1st place, gold medalist(s)		Galina Kukleva	Russia
2nd place, silver medalist(s)		Uschi Disl	Germany
3rd place, bronze medalist(s)		Katrin Apel	Germany

The Women's 7.5 kilometre sprint biathlon competition at the 1998 Winter Olympics was held on 15 February, at Nozawa Onsen. Competitors raced over two 2.5 kilometre loops and one 3.0 kilometre loop of the skiing course, shooting two times, once prone and once standing. Each miss was penalized by requiring the competitor to race over a 150-metre penalty loop.

== Results ==
Rank	Bib	Name	Country	Time	Penalties	Deficit
1st place, gold medalist(s)	33	Galina Kukleva	Russia	23:08.0	1 (1+0)	–
2nd place, silver medalist(s)	35	Uschi Disl	Germany	23:08.7	1 (0+1)	+0.7
3rd place, bronze medalist(s)	2	Katrin Apel	Germany	23:32.4	1 (0+1)	+24.4
4	41	Soňa Mihoková	Slovakia	23:42.3	1 (0+1)	+34.3
5	28	Yu Shumei	China	23:44.0	0 (0+0)	+36.0
6	31	Anna Stera	Poland	23:53.1	2 (1+1)	+45.1
7	22	Martina Jašicová	Slovakia	23:54.5	1 (1+0)	+46.5
8	29	Mari Lampinen	Finland	23:55.2	0 (0+0)	+47.2
9	54	Anna Murínová	Slovakia	23:56.7	0 (0+0)	+48.7
10	39	Nathalie Santer	Italy	23:59.6	1 (1+0)	+51.6
11	30	Olena Petrova	Ukraine	24:04.5	1 (1+0)	+56.5
12	32	Andreja Grašič	Slovenia	24:05.2	1 (0+1)	+57.2
13	58	Albina Akhatova	Russia	24:06.4	2 (1+1)	+58.4
14	57	Emmanuelle Claret	France	24:08.7	1 (0+1)	+1:00.7
15	62	Annette Sikveland	Norway	24:09.5	2 (1+1)	+1:01.5
16	10	Petra Behle	Germany	24:09.9	2 (2+0)	+1:01.9
17	44	Magdalena Forsberg	Sweden	24:19.5	3 (0+3)	+1:11.5
18	40	Margarita Dulova	Kazakhstan	24:21.7	1 (0+1)	+1:13.7
19	60	Tetyana Vodopyanova	Ukraine	24:23.3	0 (0+0)	+1:15.3
20	61	Inna Sheshkil	Kazakhstan	24:32.9	1 (0+1)	+1:24.9
21	25	Nina Lemesh	Ukraine	24:39.8	1 (0+1)	+1:31.8
22	20	Irina Tananayko	Belarus	24:42.5	0 (0+0)	+1:34.5
23	48	Liv Grete Skjelbreid	Norway	24:44.0	3 (2+1)	+1:36.0
24	45	Svetlana Paramygina	Belarus	24:50.0	2 (0+2)	+1:42.0
25	27	Corinne Niogret	France	24:54.7	2 (1+1)	+1:46.7
26	55	Eva Háková	Czech Republic	24:58.6	1 (1+0)	+1:50.6
27	16	Olga Romasko	Russia	25:03.6	3 (2+1)	+1:55.6
28	3	Nataliya Moroz	Belarus	25:04.7	0 (0+0)	+1:56.7
29	34	Ekaterina Dafovska	Bulgaria	25:06.7	2 (0+2)	+1:58.7
30	51	Martina Zellner	Germany	25:09.8	2 (2+0)	+2:01.8
31	14	Éva Tófalvi	Romania	25:10.3	2 (1+1)	+2:02.3
32	47	Myriam Bédard	Canada	25:11.3	0 (0+0)	+2:03.3
33	64	Kristina Sabasteanski	United States	25:12.2	1 (1+0)	+2:04.2
34	36	Ieva Cederštrēma	Latvia	25:12.7	2 (1+1)	+2:04.7
35	8	Jiřína Pelcová	Czech Republic	25:14.5	1 (0+1)	+2:06.5
36	18	Tadeja Brankovič	Slovenia	25:20.1	3 (2+1)	+2:12.1
37	13	Ann Elen Skjelbreid	Norway	25:22.8	4 (1+3)	+2:14.8
38	49	Michelle Collard	Canada	25:26.1	0 (0+0)	+2:18.1
39	17	Sun Ribo	China	25:29.0	3 (1+2)	+2:21.0
40	15	Irena Novotná	Czech Republic	25:30.4	3 (1+2)	+2:22.4
41	12	Pavlina Filipova	Bulgaria	25:34.8	3 (1+2)	+2:26.8
42	63	Halina Guńka	Poland	25:39.0	5 (3+2)	+2:31.0
43	5	Florence Baverel	France	25:39.6	1 (0+1)	+2:31.6
44	7	Anna Sprung	Russia	25:42.7	4 (0+4)	+2:34.7
45	26	Agata Suszka	Poland	25:45.1	3 (0+3)	+2:37.1
46	19	Katja Holanti	Finland	25:46.2	2 (2+0)	+2:38.2
47	42	Kerryn Rim	Australia	25:49.1	2 (1+1)	+2:41.1
48	23	Deborah Nordyke	United States	25:50.5	2 (0+2)	+2:42.5
49	1	Iryna Merkushina	Ukraine	25:58.6	3 (1+2)	+2:50.6
50	59	Kristina Brounéus	Sweden	26:05.3	2 (1+1)	+2:57.3
51	9	Eva-Karin Westin	Sweden	26:07.8	1 (1+0)	+2:59.8
52	53	Nataliya Ryzhenkova	Belarus	26:10.5	4 (1+3)	+3:02.5
53	46	Hiromi Seino	Japan	26:13.5	4 (4+0)	+3:05.5
54	21	Anne Briand-Bouthiaux	France	26:16.1	5 (3+2)	+3:08.1
55	56	Ryoko Takahashi	Japan	26:34.2	5 (2+3)	+3:26.2
56	4	Gunn Margit Andreassen	Norway	26:36.2	4 (3+1)	+3:28.2
57	38	Kateřina Losmanová	Czech Republic	26:51.7	3 (1+2)	+3:43.7
58	37	Stacey Wooley	United States	27:03.0	3 (1+2)	+3:55.0
59	52	Lucija Larisi	Slovenia	27:14.9	4 (1+3)	+4:06.9
60	24	Maria Schylander	Sweden	27:46.9	4 (2+2)	+4:38.9
61	11	Mie Takeda	Japan	28:10.1	6 (4+2)	+5:02.1
62	6	Elena Gorohova	Moldova	28:21.5	5 (2+3)	+5:13.5
63	50	Bernadett Dira	Hungary	28:48.9	5 (3+2)	+5:40.9
64	43	Zsuzsanna Bekecs	Hungary	29:50.3	6 (3+3)	+6:42.3
