= Iceland at the 1998 Winter Olympics =

- IOC code: ISL
- NOC: National Olympic and Sports Association of Iceland
- Website: www.isi.is (in Icelandic)

in Nagano
- Competitors: 7 (4 men, 3 women) in 1 sport
- Flag bearer: Theódóra Mathiesen
- Medals: Gold 0 Silver 0 Bronze 0 Total 0

Winter Olympics appearances (overview)
- 1948; 1952; 1956; 1960; 1964; 1968; 1972; 1976; 1980; 1984; 1988; 1992; 1994; 1998; 2002; 2006; 2010; 2014; 2018; 2022; 2026

Iceland was represented at the 1998 Winter Olympics in Nagano, Japan by the National Olympic and Sports Association of Iceland.

In total, seven athletes including four men and three women represented Iceland in one sport – alpine skiing.

== Competitors ==
In total, seven athletes represented Iceland at the 1998 Winter Olympics in Nagano, Japan in one sport.

Sport	Men	Women	Total
Alpine skiing	4	3	7
Total	4	3	7

== Alpine skiing ==
In total, seven Icelandic athletes participated in the alpine skiing events – Haukur Arnórsson, Kristinn Björnsson, Sveinn Brynjólfsson, Arnór Gunnarsson, Theódóra Mathiesen, Sigríður Þorláksdóttir and Brynja Þorsteinsdóttir.

The men's giant slalom was due to take place on 18 February 1998 but was postponed due to heavy snow and instead took place on 19 February 1998. Björnsson completed his first run in a time of one minute 25.47 seconds. He did not finish his second run. Arnórsson did not finish his first run and did not take part in the second run.

The women's slalom took place on 19 February 1998. Neither Mathiesen, Þorláksdóttir nor Þorsteinsdóttir finished their first run and they did not take part in the second run.

The women's giant slalom took place on 20 February 1998. Neither Mathiesen nor Þorsteinsdóttir finished their first run and they did not take part in the second run.

The men's slalom took place on 21 February 1998. Brynjólfsson completed his first run in a time of one minute 3.52 seconds. He completed his second run in a time of one minute 2.66 seconds for a total time of two minutes 6.18 seconds to finish 25th overall. Neither Arnórsson, Björnsson nor Gunnarsson finished their first run and they did not take part in the second run.

Athlete	Event	Race 1	Race 2	Total	
Athlete	Event	Time	Time	Time	Rank
Haukur Arnórsson	Men's giant slalom	DNF	–	DNF	–
Kristinn Björnsson	Men's giant slalom	1:25.47	DNF	DNF	–
Arnór Gunnarsson	Men's slalom	DNF	–	DNF	–
Haukur Arnórsson	Men's slalom	DNF	–	DNF	–
Kristinn Björnsson	Men's slalom	DNF	–	DNF	–
Sveinn Brynjólfsson	Men's slalom	1:03.52	1:02.66	2:06.18	25
Brynja Þorsteinsdóttir	Women's giant slalom	DNF	–	DNF	–
Theódóra Mathiesen	Women's giant slalom	DNF	–	DNF	–
Theódóra Mathiesen	Women's slalom	DNF	–	DNF	–
Sigríður Þorláksdóttir	Women's slalom	DNF	–	DNF	–
Brynja Þorsteinsdóttir	Women's slalom	DNF	–	DNF	–

The women's combined took place on 16 and 17 February 1998. Þorsteinsdóttir completed her downhill run in a time of one minute 34.49 seconds. However, she did not finish her first slalom run and did not take part in the second slalom run.

Athlete	Event	Downhill	Slalom		Total	
Athlete	Event	Time	Time 1	Time 2	Total time	Rank
Brynja Þorsteinsdóttir	Women's combined	1:34.49	DNF	–	DNF	–
