= 1998 Winter Olympics national flag bearers =

During the Parade of Nations section of the 1998 Winter Olympics opening ceremony, athletes from each country participating in the Olympics paraded in the arena. The flag from each team was borne by a sportsperson from that country chosen either by the National Olympic Committee or by the athletes themselves to represent their country. Due the rules stipulated by the Olympic Charter (and political issues between China and Chinese Taipei along the two Koreas) at the time the Organizing Committee opted for the option of the protocol order in English in as a sign of goodwill associated with the concept applied by the Organizing Committee, instead of host nation's language, Japanese. Greece led the parade, followed by Andorra. Had the parade followed the Japanese characters, Greece would have been followed by Iceland, and Russian Federation would have been the penultimate country before Japan. One sumo wrestler and one yukiko (lit. snow children) which bears a country name sign marched before each delegation. Some of famous sumo wrestlers such as Takanonami and Wakanohana accompanied the teams. The yukikos also took part in several other segments in the ceremony.

Order	Nation	Japanese	Roman transliteration	Flag bearer	Sport
1	Greece	ギリシャ	Girisha	Vasilios Dimitriadis	Alpine skiing
2	Andorra	アンドラ	Andora	Victor Gómez	Alpine skiing
3	Argentina	アルゼンチン	Aruzenchin	Carola Calello	Alpine skiing
4	Armenia	アルメニア	Arumenia	Alla Mikayelyan	Cross-country skiing
5	Australia	オーストラリア	Ōsutoraria	Richard Nizielski	Short track speed skating
6	Austria	オーストリア	Ōsutoria	Emese Hunyady	Speed skating
7	Azerbaijan	アゼルバイジャン	Azerubaijan	Yuliya Vorobyova	Figure skating
8	Belarus	ベラルーシ	Berarūshi	Aleksandr Popov	Biathlon
9	Belgium	ベルギー	Berugī	Conrad Alleblas	Chef de Mission
10	Bermuda	バミューダ	Bamyūda	John Hoskins	Chef de Mission
11	Bosnia and Herzegovina	ボスニア・ヘルツェゴビナ	Bosunia Herutsuegobina	Mario Franjić	Bobsleigh
12	Brazil	ブラジル	Burajiru	Marcelo Apovian	Alpine skiing
13	Bulgaria	ブルガリア	Burugaria	Lyubomir Popov	Alpine skiing
14	Canada	カナダ	Kanada	Jean-Luc Brassard	Freestyle skiing
15	Chile	チリ	Chiri	Duncan Grob	Alpine skiing
16	China	中華人民共和国	Chūka Jinmin Kyōwakoku	Zhao Hongbo	Figure skating
17	Croatia	クロアチア	Kuroachia	Janica Kostelić	Alpine skiing
18	Cyprus	キプロス	Kipurosu	Andreas Vasili	Alpine skiing
19	Czech Republic	チェコ	Cheko	Lubomír Buchta	Cross-country skiing
20	Denmark	デンマーク	Denmāku	Helena Blach Lavrsen	Curling
21	Estonia	エストニア	Esutonia	Kalju Ojaste	Biathlon
22	Finland	フィンランド	Finrando	Janne Ahonen	Ski jumping
23	Macedonia	マケドニア旧ユーゴスラビア共和国	Makedonia Kyū-Yūgosurabia Kyōwakoku	Gjoko Dineski	Cross-country skiing
24	France	フランス	Furansu	Philippe Candeloro	Figure skating
25	Georgia	グルジア	Gurujia	Sofia Akhmeteli	Alpine skiing
26	Germany	ドイツ	Doitsu	Jochen Behle	Cross-country skiing
27	Great Britain	イギリス	Igirisu	Mike Dixon	Biathlon
28	Hungary	ハンガリー	Hangarī	Krisztina Egyed	Speed skating
29	Iceland	アイスランド	Aisurando	Theódóra Mathiesen	Alpine skiing
30	India	インド	Indo	Shiva Keshavan	Luge
31	Iran	イラン	Iran	Hassan Shemshaki	Alpine skiing
32	Ireland	アイルランド	Airurando	Terry McHugh	Bobsleigh
33	Israel	イスラエル	Isuraeru	Michael Shmerkin	Figure skating
34	Italy	イタリア	Itaria	Gerda Weissensteiner	Luge
35	Jamaica	ジャマイカ	Jamaika	Ricky McIntosh	Bobsleigh
36	Kazakhstan	カザフスタン	Kazafusutan	Vladimir Smirnov	Cross-country skiing
37	Kenya	ケニア	Kenia	Philip Boit	Cross-country skiing
38	South Korea	大韓民国	Daikan Minkoku	Hur Seung-Wook	Alpine skiing
39	Kyrgyzstan	キルギスタン	Kirugisutan	Aleksandr Tropnikov	Biathlon
40	Latvia	ラトビア	Ratobia	Sandis Prūsis	Bobsleigh
41	Liechtenstein	リヒテンシュタイン	Rihitenshutain	Tamara Schädler	Alpine skiing
42	Lithuania	リトアニア	Ritoania	Povilas Vanagas	Figure skating
43	Luxembourg	ルクセンブルク	Rukusenburuku	Patrick Schmit	Figure skating
44	Moldova	モルドバ	Morudoba	Ion Bucsa	Biathlon
45	Monaco	モナコ	Monako	Gilbert Bessi	Bobsleigh
46	Mongolia	モンゴル	Mongoru	Boldyn Sansarbileg	Short track speed skating
47	Netherlands	オランダ	Oranda	Carla Zijlstra	Speed skating
48	New Zealand	ニュージーランド	Nyūjīrando	Peter Henry	Bobsleigh
49	Norway	ノルウェー	Noruwē	Espen Bredesen	Ski jumping
50	North Korea	朝鮮民主主義人民共和国	Chōsen Minshushugi Jinmin Kyōwakoku	Yun Chol	Short track speed skating
51	Poland	ポーランド	Pōrando	Jan Ziemianin	Biathlon
52	Portugal	ポルトガル	Porutogaru	Mafalda Pereira	Freestyle skiing
53	Puerto Rico	プエルトリコ	Puertoriko	José Ferrer	Bobsleigh
54	Romania	ルーマニア	Rūmania	Mihaela Dascălu	Speed skating
55	Russia	ロシア	Roshia	Aleksey Prokurorov	Cross-country skiing
56	Slovakia	スロバキア	Surobakia	Ivan Bátory	Cross-country skiing
57	Slovenia	スロベニア	Surobenia	Primož Peterka	Ski jumping
58	South Africa	南アフリカ	Minami-Afurika	Shirene Human	Figure skating
59	Spain	スペイン	Supein	Juan Jesús Gutiérrez	Cross-country skiing
60	Sweden	スウェーデン	Suwēden	Torgny Mogren	Cross-country skiing
61	Switzerland	スイス	Suisu	Guido Acklin	Bobsleigh
62	Chinese Taipei	チャイニーズ・タイペイ	Chainīzu Taipei	Sun Kuang-Ming	Bobsleigh
63	Trinidad and Tobago	トリニダード・トバゴ	Torinidādo Tobago	Curtis Harry	Bobsleigh
64	Turkey	トルコ	Toruko	Arif Alaftargil	Alpine skiing
65	Ukraine	ウクライナ	Ukuraina	Andriy Deryzemlya	Biathlon
66	United States	アメリカ合衆国	Amerika Gasshūkoku	Eric Flaim	Short track speed skating
67	Uruguay	ウルグアイ	Uruguai	Gabriel Hottegindre	Alpine skiing
68	Uzbekistan	ウズベキスタン	Uzubekisutan	Komil Urunbayev	Alpine skiing
69	Venezuela	ベネズエラ	Benezuera	Iginia Boccalandro	Luge
70	Virgin Islands	バージン諸島	Bājin-Shotō	Paul Zar	Bobsleigh
71	FR Yugoslavia	ユーゴスラビア	Yūgosurabia	Marko Đorđević	Alpine skiing
72	Japan	日本	Nippon	Hiroyasu Shimizu	Speed skating
