= Arnórsson =

Arnórsson may refer to:

- Einar Arnórsson (1880–1955), Icelandic politician, lawyer and law professor
- Haukur Arnórsson (born 1971), Icelandic alpine skier
- Kolbeinn ungi Arnórsson (1208–1245), Icelandic chieftain or goði of the Ásbirningar family clan
- Þjóðólfr Arnórsson, 11th-century Icelandic skáld, court poet to the Norwegian kings Magnus the Good and Harald Hardrada

== See also ==
- Arnarson
