= Andrzej Bachleda =

Andrzej Bachleda may refer to:

- Andrzej Bachleda (born 1947), Polish former alpine skier
- Andrzej Bachleda (born 1975), Polish former alpine skier
