= Uruguay at the 1998 Winter Olympics =

- IOC code: URU
- NOC: Uruguayan Olympic Committee
- Website: www.cou.org.uy (in Spanish)

in Nagano
- Competitors: 1 (man) in 1 sport
- Flag bearer: Gabriel Hottegindre
- Medals: Gold 0 Silver 0 Bronze 0 Total 0

Winter Olympics appearances (overview)
- 1998; 2002–2022; 2026

Uruguay competed at the 1998 Winter Olympics in Nagano, Japan, from 7 to 22 February 1998. It was the country's debut appearance at the Winter Olympics. The Uruguayan delegation consisted of a single male athlete, Gabriel Hottegindre, competing in one sport. Uruguay did not win any medals at the Games.

== Background ==
The Uruguayan Olympic Committee was formed on 27 October 1923 and recognized by the International Olympic Committee (IOC) in the same year. Uruguay first competed at the Summer Olympics in the 1924 Summer Olympics. However, the nation made its first Winter Olympics appearance only at the 1998 Winter Olympics in Nagano.

The 1998 Winter Olympics was held in Nagano, Japan, between 7 and 22 February 1998. Alpine skier Gabriel Hottegindre served as Uruguay's flagbearer during the opening ceremony on 7 February 1998. Jamaica did not win a medal at the Games.

== Competitors ==
The Uruguayan team consisted of a single athlete competing in a single sport.

| Sport | Men | Women | Total |
|---|---|---|---|
| Alpine skiing | 1 | 0 | 1 |
| Total | 1 | 0 | 1 |

== Alpine skiing ==
Uruguay qualified one athlete for the alpine skiing event with Hottegindre representing the country at the event. This was Uruguay's debut in the Alpine skiing event as it was the country's first appearance at the Winter Olympics. Hottegindre was born on 26 November 1979 in Haute-Savoie in France, to a French father and Uruguayan mother. He was brought up in the Mont Blanc region, and began skiing at the age of three. He wanted to compete in the Winter Olympics, and approached Julio César Maglione, the president of the Uruguayan Olympic Committee, for the same. As Hottegindre was ranked in the top 500 in the world in the slalom event, he convinced the committee to support him. He traveled to the Olympics with his Polish coach, a former Olympic bronze medalist.

The slalom event was held at Mount Yakebitai, in Shiga Kogen, Yamanouchi on 21 February. The start was located at an altitude of 1,890 m (6,200 ft) and the course has a vertical drop of 220 m (720 ft). Hottegindre completed his first run with a time of 1:01.98 and was placed 31st of the 65 competitors. He improved his time to 1:01.29 in his second run, to be ranked 24th. At the end of both the runs, he was classified 24th with a combined time of 2:03.27.

| Athlete | Event | Race 1 | Race 2 | Total | |
| Athlete | Event | Time | Time | Time | Rank |
|---|---|---|---|---|---|
| Gabriel Hottegindre | Men's slalom | 1:01.98 | 1:01.29 | 2:03.27 | 24 |
