= Ganahl =

Ganahl is a surname. Notable people with the surname include:

- Heidi Ganahl (born 1966), American businesswoman and author
- Manuel Ganahl (born 1990), Austrian ice hockey player
- Markus Ganahl (born 1975), Liechtensteiner alpine skier
- Rainer Ganahl (born 1961), Austrian-American artist
