= Denmark at the 1998 Winter Olympics =

- IOC code: DEN
- NOC: National Olympic Committee and Sports Confederation of Denmark
- Website: www.dif.dk (in Danish and English)

in Nagano
- Competitors: 12 (5 men, 7 women) in 6 sports
- Flag bearer: Helena Blach Lavrsen (curling)
- Medals Ranked 18th: Gold 0 Silver 1 Bronze 0 Total 1

Winter Olympics appearances (overview)
- 1948; 1952; 1956; 1960; 1964; 1968; 1972–1984; 1988; 1992; 1994; 1998; 2002; 2006; 2010; 2014; 2018; 2022; 2026

Denmark was represented at the 1998 Winter Olympics in Nagano, Japan by the National Olympic Committee and Sports Confederation of Denmark.

In total, 12 athletes including five men and seven women represented Denmark in six different sports including alpine skiing, cross-country skiing, curling, figure skating, freestyle skiing and snowboarding.

Denmark won one medal at the games after Jane Bidstrup, Dorthe Holm, Helena Blach Lavrsen, Margit Pörtner and Trine Qvist jointly claimed silver in the women's curling competition. It was Denmark's first-ever Winter Olympic medal.

== Competitors ==
In total, 12 athletes represented Denmark at the 1998 Winter Olympics in Nagano, Japan across six different sports.

Sport	Men	Women	Total
Alpine skiing	2	1	3
Cross-country skiing	1	0	1
Curling	0	5	5
Figure skating	1	0	1
Freestyle skiing	0	1	1
Snowboarding	1	0	1
Total	5	7	12

== Medalists ==
Denmark won one medal at the games after Jane Bidstrup, Dorthe Holm, Helena Blach Lavrsen Margit Pörtner and Trine Qvist jointly claimed silver in the women's curling competition.

Medal	Name	Sport	Event	Date
Silver	Jane Bidstrup; Dorthe Holm; Helena Blach Lavrsen; Margit Pörtner; Trine Qvist	Curling	Women's tournament	15 February

== Alpine skiing ==
In total, three Danish athletes participated in the alpine skiing events – Tejs Broberg, Arne Hardenberg and Katrine Hvidsteen.

Athlete	Event	Race 1	Race 2	Total	
Athlete	Event	Time	Time	Time	Rank
Tejs Broberg	Men's super-G			1:41.09	35
Tejs Broberg	Men's giant slalom	1:25.14	1:22.00	2:47.14	27
Arne Hardenberg	Men's slalom	DNF	–	DNF	–
Katrine Hvidsteen	Women's giant slalom	DNF	–	DNF	–
Katrine Hvidsteen	Women's slalom	51.10	DNF	DNF	–

Athlete	Event	Slalom		Downhill	Total	
Athlete	Event	Time 1	Time 2	Time	Total time	Rank
Tejs Broberg	Men's combined	DNF	–	–	DNF	–
Arne Hardenberg	Men's combined	DNF	–	–	DNF	–

== Cross-country skiing ==
In total, one Danish athlete participated in the cross-country skiing events – Michael Binzer in the men's 10 km classical, the men's 15 km freestyle pursuit, the men's 30 km classical and the men's 50 km freestyle.

Event	Athlete	Race	
Event	Athlete	Time	Rank
10 km C	Michael Binzer	30:14.2	46
15 km pursuit^{1} F	Michael Binzer	45:12.0	41
30 km C	Michael Binzer	1'49:42.2	58
50 km F	Michael Binzer	2'19:20.7	41

^{1} Starting delay based on 10 km results.
C = Classical style, F = Freestyle

== Curling ==
In total, five Danish athletes participated in the curling events – Jane Bidstrup, Helena Blach Lavrsen, Dorthe Holm, Margit Pörtner and Trine Qvist in the women's competition.

Country	Skip	W	L
Canada	Sandra Schmirler	6	1
Sweden	Elisabet Gustafson	6	1
Denmark	Helena Blach Lavrsen	5	2
Great Britain	Kirsty Hay	4	3
Japan	Mayumi Ohkutsu	2	5
Norway	Dordi Nordby	2	5
United States	Lisa Schoeneberg	2	5
Germany	Andrea Schöpp	1	6

Team 1	Score	Team 2
Germany	5–6	Denmark
Denmark	9–3	United Kingdom
Sweden	5–4	Denmark
Canada	9–5	Denmark
United States	5–8	Denmark
Denmark	6–4	Japan
Denmark	8–3	Norway

Semi-final

Sheet D	1	2	3	4	5	6	7	8	9	10	Final
Denmark (Lavrsen)	1	0	0	1	2	2	1	0	0	X	7
Sweden (Gustafson)	0	0	2	0	0	0	0	2	1	X	5

Gold medal match

Sheet C	1	2	3	4	5	6	7	8	9	10	Final
Denmark (Lavrsen) (silver)	0	2	0	0	0	0	2	0	1	X	5
Canada (Schmirler)	3	0	0	1	1	1	0	1	0	X	7

== Figure skating ==
In total, one Danish athlete participated in the figure skating events – Michael Tyllesen in the men's singles.

Athlete	SP	FS	TFP	Rank
Michael Tyllesen	9	11	15.5	9

== Freestyle skiing ==
In total, one Danish athlete participated in the freestyle skiing events – Anja Bolbjerg in the women's moguls.

Athlete	Event	Qualification			Final		
Athlete	Event	Time	Points	Rank	Time	Points	Rank
Anja Bolbjerg	Moguls	34.41	22.41	9 Q	31.38	22.09	13

== Snowboarding ==
In total, one Danish athlete participated in the snowboarding events – Mike Kildevæld in the men's giant slalom.

Athlete	Race 1	Race 2	Total	
Athlete	Time	Time	Time	Rank
Mike Kildevæld	1:02.75	1:07.67	2:10.42	15
