= Tejs Broberg =

Danish alpine skier (born 1976)

Personal information
- Nationality: Danish
- Born: 15 March 1976 (age 49)

Sport
- Sport: Alpine skiing

Tejs Broberg (born 15 March 1976) is a Danish alpine skier. He competed in three events at the 1998 Winter Olympics.
