= Breki Baxter =

Icelandic footballer

Personal information
- Full name: Þorlákur Breki Þórarinsson Baxter
- Date of birth: 12 March 2005 (age 21)
- Position: Forward

Team information
- Current team: Egersund
- Number: 26

Senior career*
| Years | Team | Apps | (Gls) |
| 2020 | Höttur/Huginn | 15 | (4) |
| 2021–2023 | Selfoss | 32 | (4) |
| 2023–2024 | US Lecce | 0 | (0) |
| 2024–2025 | Stjarnan | 3 | (0) |
| 2024 | → Selfoss (loan) | 15 | (5) |
| 2025 | → ÍBV (loan) | 23 | (1) |
| 2026 | Keflavík | 18 | (2) |
| 2026– | Egersund | 9 | (1) |

International career^{‡}
| 2019 | Iceland U-15 | 2 | (0) |
| 2021 | Iceland U-17 | 2 | (0) |
| 2023 | Iceland U-19 | 1 | (0) |
- * Club domestic league appearances and goals as of 16 November 2026 ‡ National team caps and goals as of 30 July 2025

Þorlákur Breki Þórarinsson Baxter (born 12 March 2005) is an Icelandic footballer for Norwegian First Division club Egersund.

== Career ==
Breki started his senior team career with Höttur/Huginn in the fourth-tier 3. deild karla in 2020, where he scored 4 goals in 15 matches. The following season, he joined Selfoss where he scored 4 goals in 32 matches in the second-tier 1. deild karla.

In 2023, he joined US Lecce. He returned to Iceland in 2024 and joined Stjarnan. He was loaned to Selfoss in April where he scored 5 goals in 15 matches. He was recalled in August and went on to appear in 3 matches in the Besta deild karla for Stjarnan.

In February 2025, he joined Besta deild club ÍBV on a loan.

In September 2026, he joined the Norwegian First Division club Egersund.

== Personal life ==
Breki is the son of former alpine skier and footballer Sigríður Þorláksdóttir Baxter.
