= Christiane Mitterwallner =

Austrian alpine skier (born 1974)

Christiane Mitterwallner (born 10 July 1974, in Schladming) is an Austrian former alpine skier who competed in the 1998 Winter Olympics, where she tied for 20th in the women's giant slalom.
