= Mirjana Granzov =

Serbian alpine skier (born 1980)

Personal information
- Nationality: Serbian
- Born: 6 January 1980 (age 45); Sarajevo, Yugoslavia

Sport
- Sport: Alpine skiing

Mirjana Granzov (born 6 January 1980) is a Serbian alpine skier. She competed in the women's slalom at the 1998 Winter Olympics.
