= Sophie Ormond =

British alpine skier (born 1979)

Sophie Ormond (born 4 August 1979) is a British former alpine skier who competed in the 1998 Winter Olympics.
