= Bernadett Dira =

Hungarian biathlete (born 1980)

Personal information
- Nationality: Hungarian
- Born: 8 April 1980 (age 44)

Sport
- Sport: Biathlon

Bernadett Dira (born 8 April 1980) is a Hungarian biathlete. She competed in the women's sprint event at the 1998 Winter Olympics.
