= Arnór Gunnarsson =

Icelandic alpine skier (born 1971)

Personal information
- Nationality: Icelandic
- Born: 25 April 1971 (age 53); Ísafjörður, Iceland

Sport
- Sport: Alpine skiing
- Club: Skíðafélag Ísfirðinga

Arnór Gunnarsson (born 25 April 1971) is an Icelandic alpine skier. He competed in the men's slalom at the 1998 Winter Olympics.
