= Bertalan Pintér =

Hungarian bobsledder

Personal information
- Nationality: Hungarian
- Born: 23 March 1973 (age 51); Budapest, Hungary

Sport
- Sport: Bobsleigh

Bertalan Pintér (born 23 March 1973) is a Hungarian bobsledder. He competed at the 1998, 2002 and the 2006 Winter Olympics.
