= Marek Fiurášek =

Czech Nordic combined skier

Marek Fiurášek (born 21 January 1975) was a Czech Nordic combined skier who competed in the 1990s. He finished eighth in the 4 x 5 km team event at the 1998 Winter Olympics in Nagano.

Fiurášek's best career finish was third in a World Cup B 15 km individual event in Austria in 1995.
