= Arne Hardenberg =

Danish alpine skier (born 1973)

Personal information
- Nationality: Danish
- Born: 28 November 1973 (age 51); Nuuk, Greenland

Sport
- Sport: Alpine skiing

Arne Hardenberg (born 28 November 1973) is a Danish alpine skier. He competed in two events at the 1998 Winter Olympics.
