= Katerina Tichy =

Canadian alpine skier (born 1974)

Katerina Tichy (born 11 June 1974) is a Canadian former alpine skier who competed in the 1998 Winter Olympics.
