= Zsolt Zsombor =

Hungarian bobsledder

Personal information
- Nationality: Hungarian
- Born: 4 January 1972 (age 53); Budapest, Hungary

Sport
- Sport: Bobsleigh

Zsolt Zsombor (born 4 January 1972) is a Hungarian bobsledder. He competed at the 1998 Winter Olympics and the 2002 Winter Olympics.
