= Kinga Barsi =

Hungarian alpine skier (born 1976)

Personal information
- Nationality: Hungarian
- Born: 10 July 1976 (age 48); Budapest, Hungary

Sport
- Sport: Alpine skiing

Kinga Barsi (born 10 July 1976) is a Hungarian alpine skier. She competed in the women's slalom at the 1998 Winter Olympics.
