= Marika Labancz =

Hungarian alpine skier (born 1978)

Personal information
- Nationality: Hungarian
- Born: 23 July 1978 (age 46); Nice, France

Sport
- Sport: Alpine skiing

Marika Labancz (born 23 July 1978) is a Hungarian alpine skier. She competed in the women's slalom at the 1998 Winter Olympics.
