= Péter Pallai =

Hungarian bobsledder (born 1963)

Personal information
- Nationality: Hungarian
- Born: 20 January 1963 (age 62); London, England

Sport
- Sport: Bobsleigh

Péter Pallai (born 20 January 1963) is a Hungarian bobsledder. He competed at the 1998 Winter Olympics and the 2002 Winter Olympics.
