= Arnarson =

Arnarson is an Icelandic masculine surname. Notable people with the surname include:

- Ingólfr Arnarson (c. 849–c. 910), first permanent Nordic settler of Iceland
- Örn Arnarson (born 1981), Icelandic swimmer
- Ottó P. Arnarson, member of Týr (band), a folk metal band from the Faroe Islands
- Björgvin Arnarson (born 2005), actor

== See also ==
- Arnara
