= Nicholas Frankl =

Hungarian bobsledder

Nicholas Frankl OLY
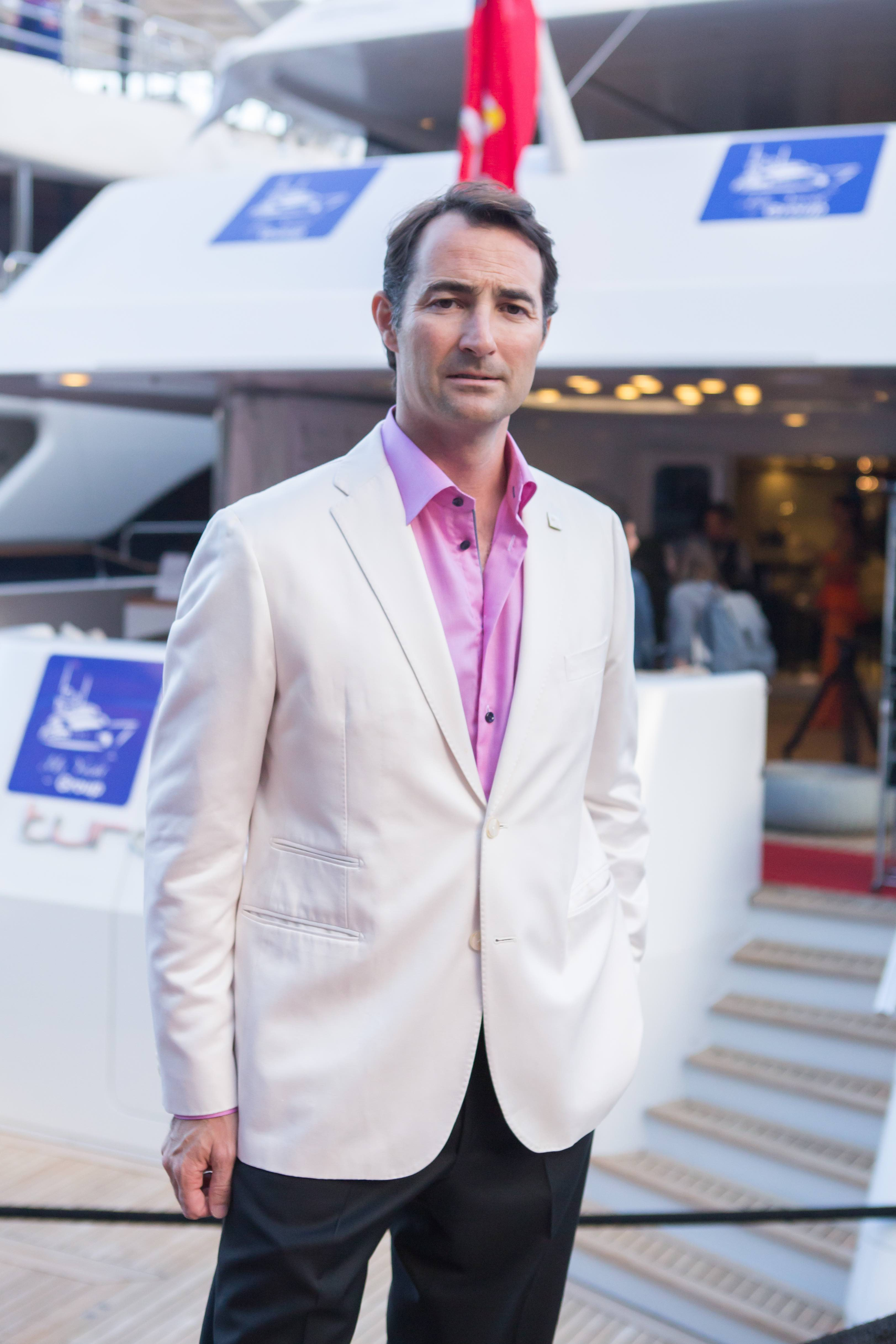
- Nicholas Frankl in 2014

Personal information
- Full name: Nicholas Alexander Frankl
- Nationality: British Hungarian
- Born: 26 July 1971 (age 55) London, England
- Occupations: Entrepreneur, automotive journalist, Olympian

Sport
- Sport: Bobsleigh
- Retired: 2002

Nicholas Frankl OLY (born 26 July 1971) is a London-born, Monaco-based serial entrepreneur, automotive journalist, and former Hungarian bobsledder. He piloted HUN1 in the two-man in the 1994 Winter Olympics in Lillehammer, Norway, and in the four-man in the 1998 Nagano, Japan and 2002 Salt Lake City, USA games, respectively.

He is the founder of several businesses including My Yacht Group a luxury events company centered around charity-focused receptions on board Superyachts; and Entertainment MarketPlace, a sponsorship and marketing company.

Frankl has been involved in the commercial space industry as an investor, advisor, and conference speaker. He has served on the advisory board of Radian Aerospace, a US-based company developing reusable spaceplane technology, and has been an investor and consultant to Axiom Space, a private space infrastructure company.

In October 2023, Frankl participated as a speaker at the ELEVATE Space & Sustainability Conference in Monte Carlo, Monaco, which brought together industry leaders to discuss developments in commercial spaceflight, innovation, and sustainability.

== Personal life ==
Frankl is the son of Margaret "June" Frankl (3 March 1941 – 28 February 2017) and Andrew Frankl, a refugee of the Hungarian revolution who fled to London in 1956, and went on to become an automotive television, radio and print journalist specializing in Formula One.

== Television and radio ==
Frankl has been featured in several programs including "Million Pound Mega Yachts", centered around the annual Monaco Yacht Show, "How'd You Get So Rich (UK)", hosted by comedienne Katherine Ryan, and "Georgey Tonight", a BBC Radio show presented by Georgey Spanswick. He has been featured in the New York Times in an article about the Bullrun Rally and its participants, and in Austin American Statesman discussing the United States Grand Prix in Austin, Texas.
