= Balázs Latrompette Yann =

Hungarian cross-country skier (born 1977)

Personal information
- Nationality: Hungarian
- Born: 2 August 1977 (age 47); Avignon, France

Sport
- Sport: Cross-country skiing

Balázs Latrompette Yann (born 2 August 1977) is a Hungarian cross-country skier. He competed in the men's 10 kilometre classical event at the 1998 Winter Olympics.
