= Marcel Maxa =

Czech alpine skier (born 1974)

Personal information
- Nationality: Czech
- Born: 20 October 1974 (age 50); Plzeň, Czechoslovakia

Sport
- Sport: Alpine skiing

Marcel Maxa (born 20 October 1974) is a Czech alpine skier. He competed in three events at the 1998 Winter Olympics.
