= Tasha Nelson =

American alpine skier (born 1974)

Tasha Marie Nelson (born July 1, 1974) is an American former alpine skier who competed in the 1998 Winter Olympics and 2002 Winter Olympics. She was born in Mound, Minnesota.
