= Ronald Stampfer =

Austrian alpine skier (born 1976)

Ronald Stampfer (born 1976) is a retired Austrian alpine skier.

He competed at the 1994 and 1995 Junior World Championships, his best placement being a 7th place in slalom at the 1994 edition.

He made his World Cup debut in January 1999 in Wengen, also collecting his first World Cup points with a 23rd place. He improved to a 13th place in February 2000 in Yongpong and 7th place in March 2000 in Schladming, both in the slalom. His last World Cup outing came in January 2001 in Wengen.

He represented the sports club WSV St. Gallenkirch.
