= Sveinn Brynjólfsson =

Icelandic alpine skier (born 1975)

Personal information
- Nationality: Icelandic
- Born: 27 July 1975 (age 49); Dalvík, Iceland

Sport
- Sport: Alpine skiing

Sveinn Brynjólfsson (born 27 July 1975) is an Icelandic alpine skier. He competed in the men's slalom at the 1998 Winter Olympics.
