= Mónika Kovács =

Hungarian alpine skier (born 1976)

Personal information
- Nationality: Hungarian
- Born: 15 March 1976 (age 50) Budapest, Hungary

Sport
- Sport: Alpine skiing

Mónika Kovács (born 15 March 1976) is a Hungarian alpine skier. She competed in four events at the 1998 Winter Olympics.
