= Iveta Knížková =

Czech biathlete (born 1967)

Personal information
- Full name: Iveta Knížková (-Roubíčková)
- Nationality: Czech
- Born: 3 March 1967 (age 58); Karlovy Vary, Czechoslovakia
- Height: 172 cm (5 ft 8 in)
- Weight: 61 kg (134 lb)

Sport
- Sport: Biathlon

Iveta Roubíčková, née Knížková (born 3 March 1967) is a Czech biathlete. She competed at the 1992 Winter Olympics and the 1994 Winter Olympics.
