= Éva Szemcsák =

Hungarian biathlete (born 1975)

Personal information
- Nationality: Hungarian
- Born: 24 March 1975 (age 50); Miskolc, Hungary

Sport
- Sport: Biathlon

Éva Szemcsák (born 24 March 1975) is a Hungarian biathlete. She competed at the 1994 Winter Olympics and the 1998 Winter Olympics.
