= Petr Garabík =

Czech biathlete (born 1970)

Personal information
- Nationality: Czech
- Born: 1 January 1970 (age 55); Jeseník, Czechoslovakia

Sport
- Sport: Biathlon

Petr Garabík (born 1 January 1970) is a Czech former biathlete. He competed at the 1994 Winter Olympics, the 1998 Winter Olympics and the 2002 Winter Olympics.
