= Jiří Džmura =

Czech-Slovak bobsledder

Jiří Džmura (born 8 April 1963) is a Czech-Slovak retired bobsledder.

== Life ==
Džmura was born on 8 April 1963 in Jablonec nad Nisou. Both his parents were Slovaks. During his sports career, he also made a living as a businessman.

== Career ==
In 1992 Winter Olympics in Albertville, Džmura competed in the two-man event together with Roman Hrabaň, earning the 25th place.

From 1994, Džmura competed in two-man events together with Pavel Polomský. They won American Cup in 1999 and 2004. Their best result in the World Cup were two third places in 1994 and 1995.

Džmura and Polomský competed in 1994 Winter Olympics in Lillehammer, earning the seventh place in the two-man event (tied with Canada). They also finished on the 10th place in the four-man event. Given the training conditions, which were incomparable to the competition, and the low development of the sport in the country, their placement was considered a great achievement. In 1998 Winter Olympics in Nagano, they withdrew from the two-man event due to Džmura's back pain.

In 1997 and 1998, there were conflicts between Džmura and the Czech Bobsleigh Association, which led Džmura to consider changing the country he represented. From 2002 until their retirement in 2005, Džmura and Polomský competed for Slovakia. They became Slovak champions in 2002. At the end of his career, Džmura was considered the best bobsledder in Czech history.
