= Johan Brolenius =

Swedish alpine skier (born 1977)

Johan Brolenius (born 7 June 1977 in Örebro) is a Swedish former alpine skier who competed in the 2006 Winter Olympics. At these Olympics, he finished 8th in the Men's slalom and 18th in the Men's combined.
