= Ivan Masařík =

Czech biathlete (born 1967)

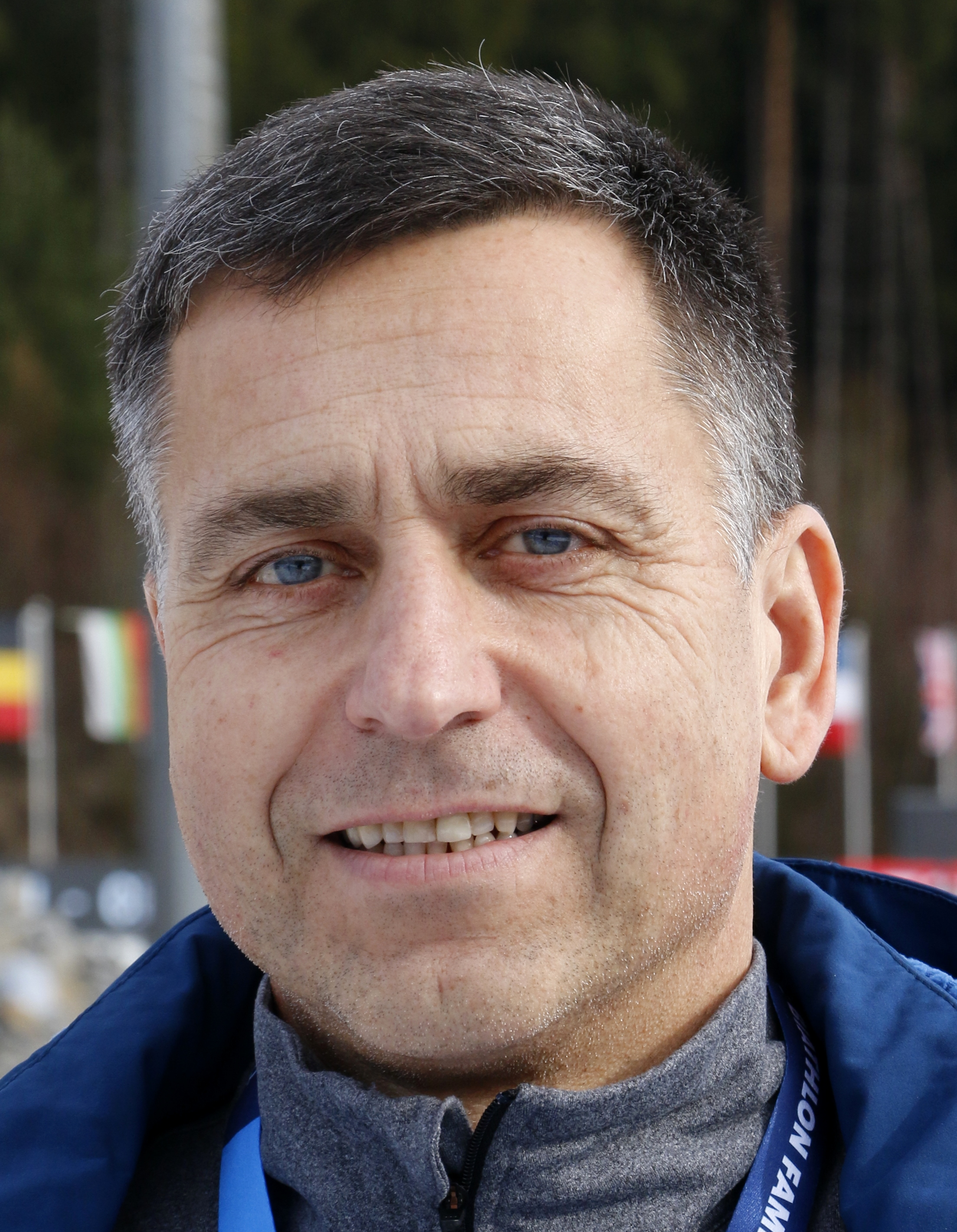
- Masařík in 2024

Personal information
- Nationality: Czech
- Born: 14 September 1967 (age 57); Jilemnice, Czechoslovakia

Sport
- Sport: Biathlon

Ivan Masařík (born 14 September 1967) is a Czech biathlete. He competed at the 1992, 1994, 1998 and the 2002 Winter Olympics.
