= Gabriel Hottegindre =

Uruguayan alpine skier (born 1979)

Gabriel Hottegindre (born 26 November 1979) is a Uruguayan alpine skier. He represented his country at the 1998 Winter Olympics in Nagano, Japan, where he placed 24th in the men's slalom race.
