= Gaku Hirasawa =

Japanese alpine skier (born 1973)

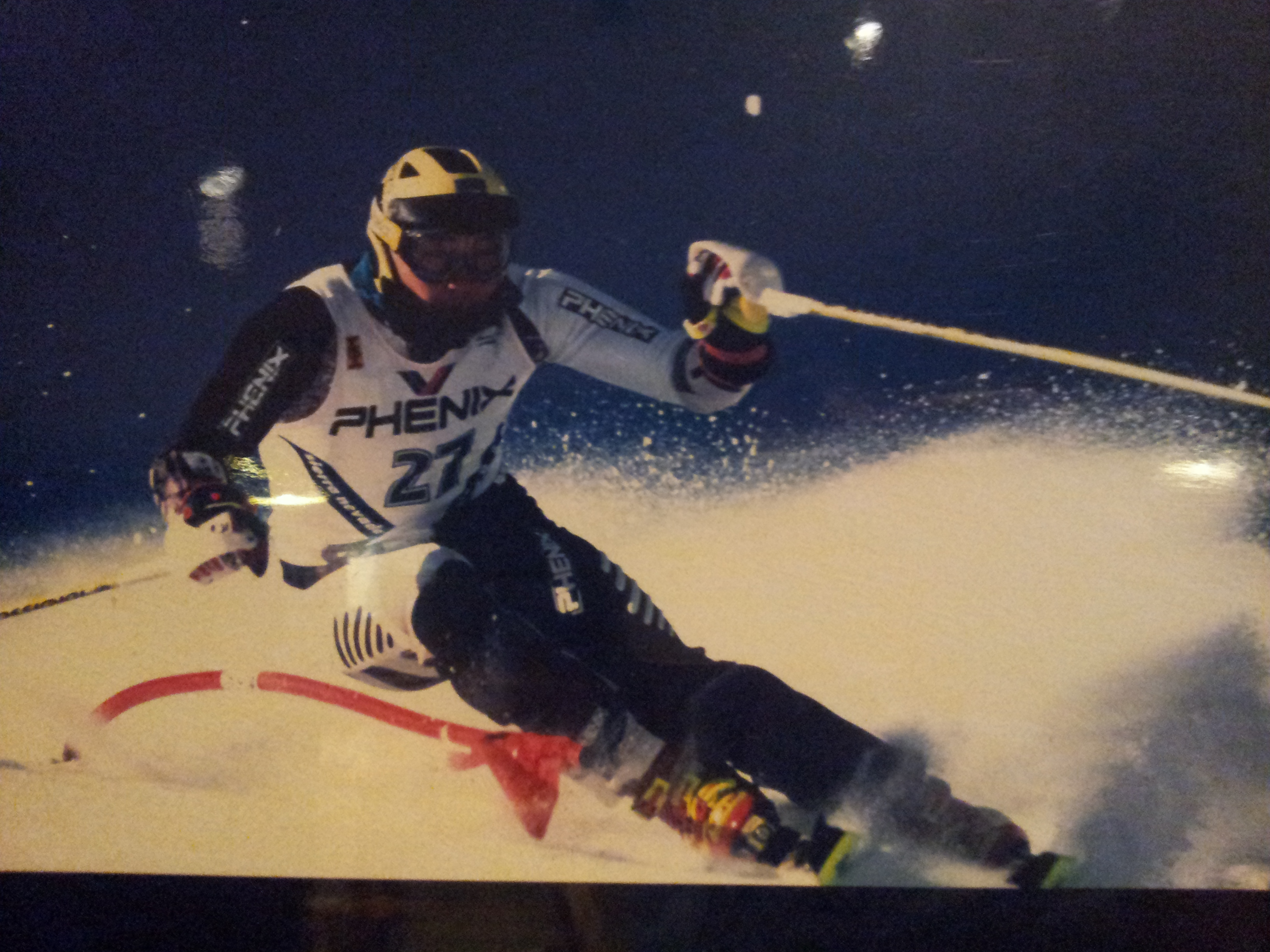
Gaku Hirasawa in 1996

Gaku Hirasawa (平澤 岳, Hirasawa Gaku; born 1 February 1973) is a Japanese alpine skier. He competed in slalom at the 1994 and 1998 Winter Olympics.
