= Pavel Polomský =

Czech bobsledder

Pavel Polomský (born 8 January 1966) is a Czech retired bobsledder.

== Life ==
Polomský was born on 8 January 1966 in Domažlice. Before he started bobsled, Polomský was a track and field athlete, competing in sprint.

== Career ==
Polomský competed in two-man events together with Jiří Džmura, who is among the best bobsledders in Czech history. They won American Cup in 1999 and 2004. Their best result in the World Cup were two third places in 1994 and 1995.

They completed in 1994 Winter Olympics in Lillehammer, earning the seventh place in the two-man event (tied with Canada). They also finished on the 10th place in the four-man event. Given the training conditions, which were incomparable to the competition, and the low development of the sport in the country, their placement was considered a great achievement. In 1998 Winter Olympics in Nagano, they withdrew from the two-man event due to Džmura's back pain, but Polomský completed also in four-man event, earning the 13th place.

From 2002 until their retirement in 2005, Polomský and Džmura competed for Slovakia. They became Slovak champions in 2002.
