= Sigríður Þorláksdóttir Baxter =

Icelandic alpine skier and footballer (born 1977)

Personal information
- Born: 27 May 1977 (age 49) Ísafjörður, Iceland
- Height: 169 cm (5 ft 7 in)
- Weight: 60 kg (132 lb)
Association football career
Youth career
- BÍ 88
Senior career*
Years	Team	Apps	(Gls)
1993	BÍ	11	(10)
1994–1997	Stjarnan	38	(16)
1998	Breiðablik	13	(2)
2000	Breiðablik	2	(1)
2002	Breiðablik	5	(0)
2006	Haukar	5	(0)
2007	Höttur	11	(4)
2008	Breiðablik	7	(0)
2008	Höttur	7	(5)
2010	Fram	14	(4)
2012–2014	Höttur	40	(6)
International career^{‡}
1993	Iceland U-17	6	(1)
1994–1997	Iceland U-21	8	(0)
Managerial career
- 2010: Fram
- 2010–2014: Höttur
- * Club domestic league appearances and goals as of 4 September 2017 ‡ National team caps and goals as of 4 September 2017

Sport
- Sport: Alpine Skiing; Football

Sigríður Björk Þorláksdóttir Baxter (born May 27, 1977) is an Icelandic retired Alpine skier and football player.

== Alpine skiing ==
Sigríður competed at the 1998 Winter Olympics in the women's slalom and was the Icelandic national champion in slalom and Giant slalom in 1998.

== Football ==
Sigríður played football in the Icelandic top-tier Úrvalsdeild kvenna for Stjarnan and Breiðablik, where she won the Icelandic Football Cup and Icelandic Football Super Cup in 1998.

She was a player-manager for Fram in 2010 and took over as manager of Höttur women's team in November 2010 where she served until 2014.

== Personal life ==
Sigríður's son is footballer Þorlákur Breki Baxter.
