= Jiří Holubec =

Czech biathlete (born 1966)

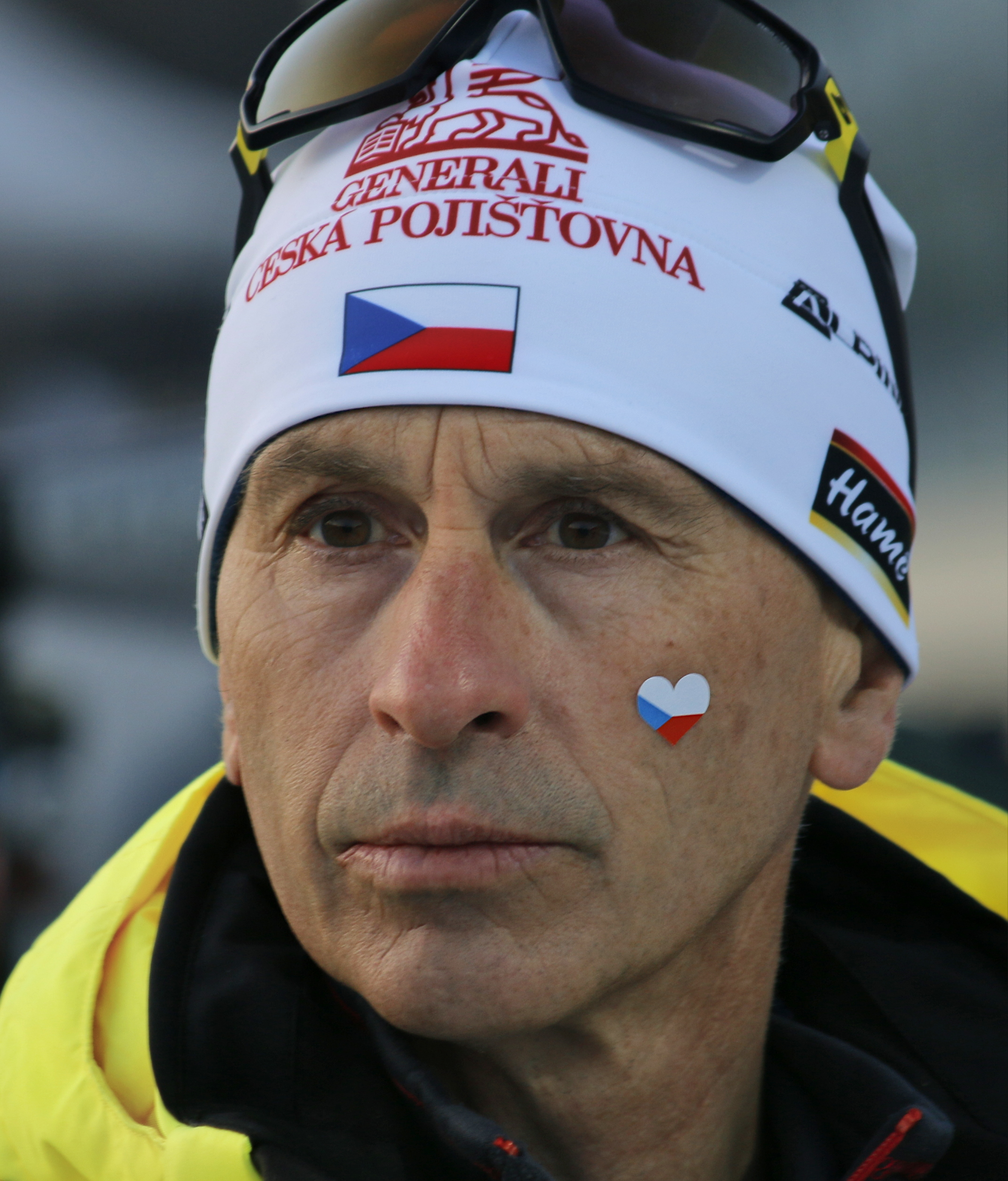
- Jiří Holubec (2023)

Personal information
- Nationality: Czech
- Born: 3 March 1966 (age 59); Jilemnice, Czechoslovakia

Sport
- Sport: Biathlon

Jiří Holubec (born 3 March 1966) is a Czech biathlete. He competed at the 1988, 1992, 1994 and the 1998 Winter Olympics. After retiring from competition he became a coach, serving as an assistant coach to the Czech women's biathlon team.
