= Pavel Puškár =

Czech bobsledder

Personal information
- Nationality: Czech
- Born: 19 April 1965 (age 59); Most, Czechoslovakia
- Height: 5 ft 10 in (178 cm)

Sport
- Sport: Bobsleigh

Pavel Puškár (born 19 April 1965) is a Czech bobsledder. He competed at the 1992, 1994, 1998 and the 2002 Winter Olympics.
