= Katrine Hvidsteen =

Danish alpine skier (born 1977)

Personal information
- Nationality: Danish
- Born: 16 February 1977 (age 48)

Sport
- Sport: Alpine skiing

Katrine Hvidsteen (born 16 February 1977) is a Danish alpine skier. She competed in two events at the 1998 Winter Olympics.
