= Brynja Þorsteinsdóttir =

Icelandic alpine skier (born 1977)

Personal information
- Nationality: Icelandic
- Born: 29 May 1977 (age 47); Akureyri, Iceland

Sport
- Sport: Alpine skiing

Brynja Þorsteinsdóttir (born 29 May 1977) is an Icelandic alpine skier. She competed in three events at the 1998 Winter Olympics.
