= Zsuzsanna Bekecs =

Hungarian biathlete (born 1976)

Personal information
- Nationality: Hungarian
- Born: 17 May 1976 (age 48)

Sport
- Sport: Biathlon

Zsuzsanna Bekecs (born 17 May 1976) is a Hungarian biathlete. She competed at the 1998 Winter Olympics and the 2002 Winter Olympics.
