= Irena Česneková =

Czech biathlete (born 1972)

Personal information
- Full name: Irena Novotná-Česneková
- Nationality: Czech
- Born: 2 May 1972 (age 52); Třebíč, Czechoslovakia

Sport
- Sport: Biathlon

Irena Novotná-Česneková (born 2 May 1972) is a Czech biathlete. She competed at the 1994, 1998, 2002 and the 2002 Winter Olympics.
