= Kristinn Björnsson =

Icelandic alpine skier (born 1972)

Kristinn Björnsson (born 26 May 1972) is an Icelandic former alpine skier who competed in the 1992 Winter Olympics, in the 1994 Winter Olympics, in the 1998 Winter Olympics, and in the 2002 Winter Olympics.

Björnsson became the first ever skier from Iceland to win a World Cup medal. During the 1997-1998 world cup stop in Park City, Utah, moved up from 17th to the silver medal position in the slalom event during the second run. Kristinn Bjornsson participated in three editions of the Olympic Winter Games, in Lillehammer in 1994, Nagano in 1998 and Salt Lake City in 2002. He competed in four races and obtained his best result in the Salt Lake City slalom with a 21st place.
