= Haukur Arnórsson =

Icelandic alpine skier (born 1971)

Personal information
- Nationality: Icelandic
- Born: 17 April 1971 (age 55) Reykjavík, Iceland

Sport
- Sport: Alpine skiing

Haukur Arnórsson (born 17 April 1971) is an Icelandic alpine skier. He competed at the 1994 Winter Olympics and the 1998 Winter Olympics.
