= Markus Eberle =

German alpine skier (born 1969)

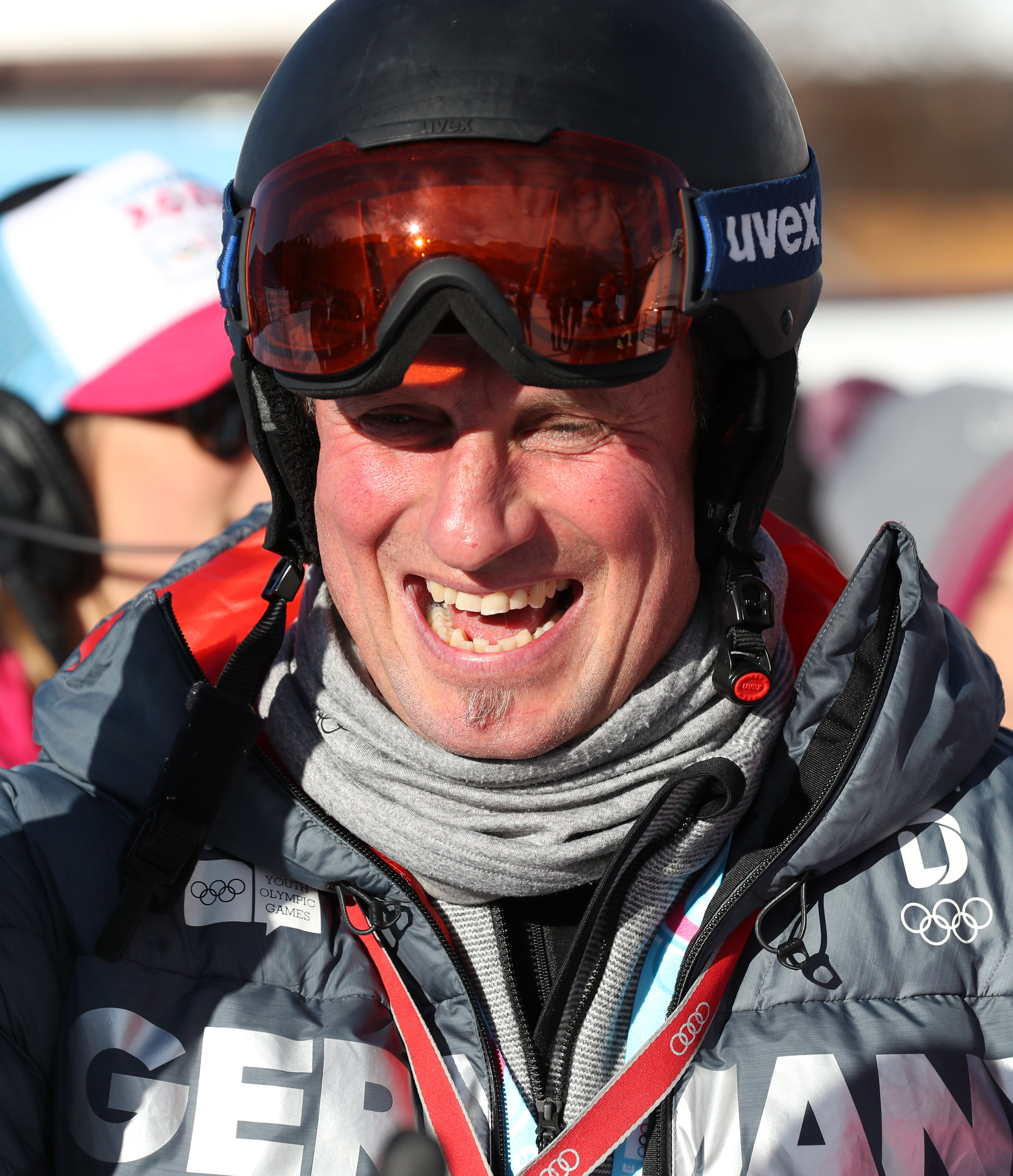
Markus Eberle (2020)

Markus Eberle (born 2 February 1969 in Riezlern) is an Austrian and later German former alpine skier who competed for Germany in the 1998 Winter Olympics and 2002 Winter Olympics.
