= Eva Háková =

Czech biathlete (born 1969)

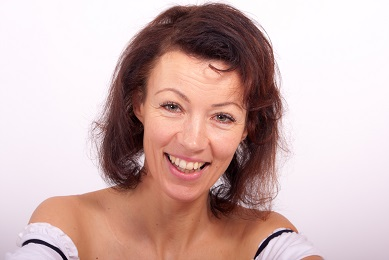

Personal information
- Nationality: Czech
- Born: 8 July 1969 (age 55); Karlovy Vary, Czechoslovakia

Sport
- Sport: Biathlon

Eva Háková (born 8 July 1969) is a Czech biathlete. She competed at the 1994, 1998 and the 2002 Winter Olympics.
