= Kentaro Minagawa =

Japanese alpine skier (born 1977)

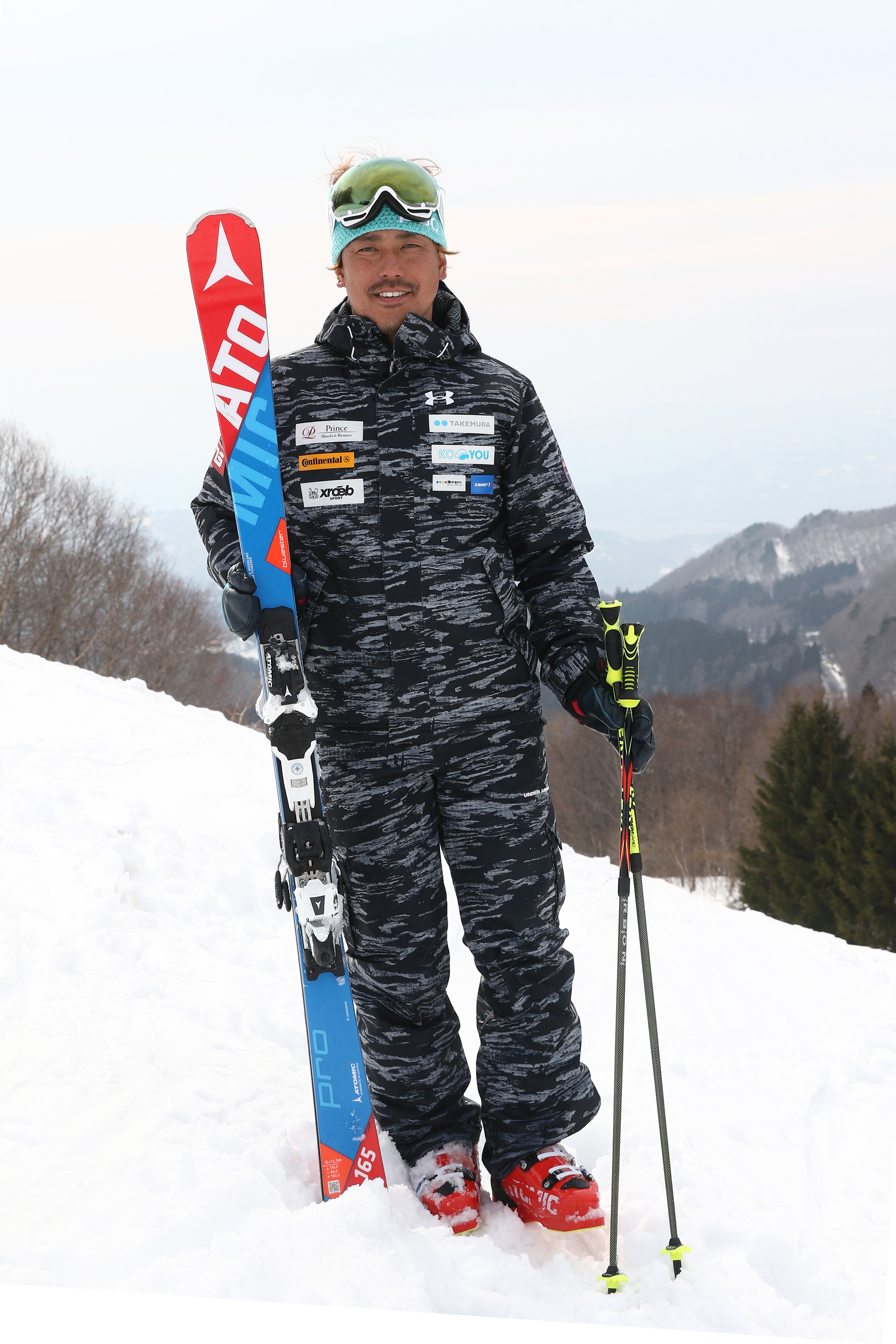

Personal information
- Native name: 皆川 賢太郎
- Born: May 17, 1977 (age 48)
- Spouse: Aiko Uemura (2009–present)

Sport
- Sport: Alpine skiing

Kentaro Minagawa (皆川 賢太郎, Minagawa Kentarō; born May 17, 1977) is a Japanese alpine skier. His first international successes were at the 1996 Junior World Championships in Schwyz, with a 5th rank in Slalom, and a 9th rank in Giant slalom.

Since the 1997 Alpine Skiing World Cup he has been participating regularly in World Cup races, nine times ranking in the top ten. Shortly before the 2006 Winter Olympics he ranked 4th in Wengen, Switzerland. At the 2006 Winter Olympics in Turin, Italy he also ranked 4th, the best result of a Japanese skier since Chiharu Igaya's silver medal at the 1956 Winter Olympics.

In June 2009, he married Japanese popular freestyle skier, Aiko Uemura.
