= Theódóra Mathiesen =

Icelandic alpine skier (born 1975)

Personal information
- Nationality: Icelandic
- Born: 5 April 1975 (age 51)

Sport
- Sport: Alpine skiing

Theódóra Mathiesen (born 5 April 1975) is an Icelandic alpine skier. She competed in two events at the 1998 Winter Olympics.
