= Markus Ganahl =

Liechtenstein alpine skier (born 1975)

Markus Ganahl (born 12 February 1975 in Vaduz) is a Liechtensteiner former alpine skier who competed in the men's slalom and men's giant slalom at the 2002 Winter Olympics.
