= Andrzej Bachleda (born 1975) =

Polish alpine skier (born 1975)

Andrzej Bachleda-Curuś III (born 1 January 1975 in Zakopane) is a Polish former alpine skier who competed in the 1998 Winter Olympics and 2002 Winter Olympics.
