= Alpine skiing at the 1998 Winter Olympics =

Alpine Skiing at the XVIII Olympic Winter Games
- Pictograms for downhill (left), slalom (center), and combined alpine skiing (right)
- Venue: Hakuba & Shiga Kogen; Nagano, Honshu, Japan
- Dates: 10–21 February 1998
- Competitors: 249 from 49 nations

Location in Japan

Alpine Skiing at the 1998 Winter Olympics consisted of ten alpine skiing events. The speed events were held at Hakuba and the technical events at Shiga Kogen. There were a number of race postponements due to weather; the events began on 10 February and ended on 21 February.

== Medal summary ==
Nine nations won medals in alpine skiing, with Austria winning the most with eleven (3 gold, 4 silver, 4 bronze). Katja Seizinger led the individual medal table, with two gold medals and a bronze, while Hermann Maier was the most successful male skier, with two gold medals. Zali Steggall's bronze medal was the first individual medal at the Winter Olympics for Australia.

=== Medal table ===
| Rank | Nation | Gold | Silver | Bronze | Total |
|---|---|---|---|---|---|
| 1 | Austria | 3 | 4 | 4 | 11 |
| 2 | Germany | 3 | 1 | 2 | 6 |
| 3 | Norway | 1 | 3 | 0 | 4 |
| 4 | Italy | 1 | 1 | 0 | 2 |
| 5 | France | 1 | 0 | 1 | 2 |
| 6 | United States | 1 | 0 | 0 | 1 |
| 7 | Switzerland | 0 | 1 | 1 | 2 |
| 8 | Sweden | 0 | 1 | 0 | 1 |
| 9 | Australia | 0 | 0 | 1 | 1 |
| Totals (9 entries) | | 10 | 11 | 9 | 30 |

=== Men's events ===
| Event | Gold | | Silver | | Bronze | |
|---|---|---|---|---|---|---|
| Downhill | Jean-Luc Crétier; France | 1:50.11 | Lasse Kjus; Norway | 1:50.51 | Hannes Trinkl; Austria | 1:50.63 |
| Super-G | Hermann Maier; Austria | 1:34.82 | Didier Cuche; Switzerland; Hans Knauss; Austria | 1:35.43 | Not awarded | |
| Giant Slalom | Hermann Maier; Austria | 2:38.51 | Stephan Eberharter; Austria | 2:39.36 | Michael von Grünigen; Switzerland | 2:39.69 |
| Slalom | Hans Petter Buraas; Norway | 1:49.31 | Ole Kristian Furuseth; Norway | 1:50.64 | Thomas Sykora; Austria | 1:50.68 |
| Combined | Mario Reiter; Austria | 3:08.06 | Lasse Kjus; Norway | 3:08.65 | Christian Mayer; Austria | 3:10.11 |

=== Women's events ===
| Event | Gold | | Silver | | Bronze | |
|---|---|---|---|---|---|---|
| Downhill | Katja Seizinger; Germany | 1:28.89 | Pernilla Wiberg; Sweden | 1:29.18 | Florence Masnada; France | 1:29.37 |
| Super-G | Picabo Street; United States | 1:18.02 | Michaela Dorfmeister; Austria | 1:18.03 | Alexandra Meissnitzer; Austria | 1:18.09 |
| Giant Slalom | Deborah Compagnoni; Italy | 2:50.59 | Alexandra Meissnitzer; Austria | 2:52.39 | Katja Seizinger; Germany | 2:52.61 |
| Slalom | Hilde Gerg; Germany | 1:32.40 | Deborah Compagnoni; Italy | 1:32.46 | Zali Steggall; Australia | 1:32.67 |
| Combined | Katja Seizinger; Germany | 2:40.74 | Martina Ertl; Germany | 2:40.92 | Hilde Gerg; Germany | 2:41.50 |

== Course information ==
| Date | Race | Start Elevation | Finish Elevation | Vertical Drop | Course Length | Average Gradient |
|---|---|---|---|---|---|---|
| Fri 13-Feb | Downhill - men | 1,765 m (5,791 ft) | 840 m (2,756 ft) | 925 m (3,035 ft) | 3.289 km (2.044 mi) | 28.1% |
| Mon 16-Feb | Downhill - women | 1,590 m (5,217 ft) | 899 m (2,949 ft) | 691 m (2,267 ft) | 2.518 km (1.565 mi) | 27.4% |
| Fri 13-Feb | Downhill - (K) - men | 1,680 m (5,512 ft) | 840 m (2,756 ft) | 840 m (2,756 ft) | 2.886 km (1.793 mi) | 29.1% |
| Tue 17-Feb | Downhill - (K) - women | 1,590 m (5,217 ft) | 899 m (2,949 ft) | 691 m (2,267 ft) | 2.518 km (1.565 mi) | 27.4% |
| Mon 16-Feb | Super-G - men | 1,490 m (4,888 ft) | 840 m (2,756 ft) | 650 m (2,133 ft) | 2.407 km (1.496 mi) | 27.0% |
| Wed 11-Feb | Super-G - women | 1,486 m (4,875 ft) | 899 m (2,949 ft) | 587 m (1,926 ft) | 2.115 km (1.314 mi) | 27.8% |
| Thu 19-Feb | Giant Slalom - men | 1,969 m (6,460 ft) | 1,530 m (5,020 ft) | 439 m (1,440 ft) | 1.487 km (0.924 mi) | 29.5% |
| Fri 20-Feb | Giant Slalom - women | 1,923 m (6,309 ft) | 1,530 m (5,020 ft) | 393 m (1,289 ft) | 1.329 km (0.826 mi) | 29.6% |
| Sat 21-Feb | Slalom - men | 1,890 m (6,201 ft) | 1,670 m (5,479 ft) | 220 m (722 ft) | 0.607 km (0.377 mi) | 36.2% |
| Thu 19-Feb | Slalom - women | 1,870 m (6,135 ft) | 1,670 m (5,479 ft) | 200 m (656 ft) | 0.530 km (0.329 mi) | 33.0% |
| Tue 10-Feb | Slalom - (K) - men | 995 m (3,264 ft) | 830 m (2,723 ft) | 165 m (541 ft) | 0.473 km (0.294 mi) | 34.9% |
| Tue 17-Feb | Slalom - (K) - women | 975 m (3,199 ft) | 830 m (2,723 ft) | 145 m (476 ft) | 0.415 km (0.258 mi) | 34.9% |

== Participating nations ==
Forty-nine nations sent alpine skiers to compete in the events in Nagano. Armenia, Belarus, the Czech Republic, Ireland, Lithuania, Macedonia, South Africa, Uruguay, and Uzbekistan made their Olympic alpine skiing debuts. Below is a list of the competing nations; in parentheses are the number of national competitors.

- Andorra (3)
- Argentina (1)
- Armenia (1)
- Australia (1)
- Austria (19)
- Belarus (1)
- Bosnia and Herzegovina (2)
- Brazil (1)
- Bulgaria (5)
- Canada (8)
- Chile (3)
- Croatia (4)
- Cyprus (1)
- Czech Republic (2)
- Denmark (3)
- Finland (5)
- France (18)
- Georgia (3)
- Germany (7)
- Great Britain (6)
- Greece (2)
- Hungary (3)
- Iran (1)
- Ireland (1)
- Iceland (7)
- Italy (22)
- Japan (10)
- Kazakhstan (2)
- South Korea (2)
- Latvia (2)
- Liechtenstein (6)
- Lithuania (1)
- Macedonia (2)
- New Zealand (1)
- Norway (12)
- Poland (1)
- Puerto Rico (1)
- Russia (7)
- Slovenia (14)
- South Africa (1)
- Spain (4)
- Sweden (7)
- Switzerland (16)
- Turkey (1)
- Ukraine (2)
- United States (22)
- Uruguay (1)
- Uzbekistan (1)
- FR Yugoslavia (2)

== See also ==
- Alpine skiing at the 1998 Winter Paralympics
