= Slovenia at the 1998 Winter Olympics =

- IOC code: SLO
- NOC: Olympic Committee of Slovenia
- Website: www.olympic.si (in Slovene and English)

in Nagano
- Competitors: 34 (21 men, 13 women) in 8 sports
- Flag bearer: Primož Peterka (ski jumping)
- Medals: Gold 0 Silver 0 Bronze 0 Total 0

Winter Olympics appearances (overview)
- 1992; 1994; 1998; 2002; 2006; 2010; 2014; 2018; 2022; 2026

Other related appearances
- Yugoslavia (1924–1988)

Slovenia competed in the 1998 Winter Olympics in Nagano, Japan. The country earned no medals.

== Competitors ==
The following is the list of number of competitors in the Games.

Sport	Men	Women	Total
Alpine skiing	9	6	15
Biathlon	5	4	9
Cross-country skiing	0	1	1
Figure skating	0	1	1
Freestyle skiing	1	0	1
Nordic combined	1	–	1
Ski jumping	5	–	5
Snowboarding	0	1	1
Total	21	13	34

== Alpine skiing ==
Men

Athlete	Event	Race 1	Race 2	Total	
Athlete	Event	Time	Time	Time	Rank
Peter Pen	Downhill			DNF	–
Aleš Brezavšček	Downhill			DNF	–
Jernej Koblar	Downhill			1:52.79	20
Aleš Brezavšček	Super-G			1:38.54	28
Peter Pen	Super-G			1:37.81	23
Jernej Koblar	Super-G			1:36.84	17
Bernhard Knauss	Giant Slalom	DNF	–	DNF	–
Jernej Koblar	Giant Slalom	1:23.49	1:20.47	2:43.96	22
Mitja Kunc	Giant Slalom	1:22.66	1:20.43	2:43.09	18
Jure Košir	Giant Slalom	1:20.97	1:19.01	2:39.98	5
Jure Košir	Slalom	DNF	–	DNF	–
Andrej Miklavc	Slalom	DNF	–	DNF	–
Matjaž Vrhovnik	Slalom	57.36	57.29	1:54.65	17
Drago Grubelnik	Slalom	57.06	DSQ	DSQ	–

Men's combined

Athlete	Slalom		Downhill	Total	
Athlete	Time 1	Time 2	Time	Total time	Rank
Jernej Koblar	DNF	–	–	DNF	–
Aleš Brezavšček	55.33	48.82	1:35.94	3:20.09	7
Peter Pen	54.21	49.62	1:36.98	3:20.81	8

Women

Athlete	Event	Race 1	Race 2	Total	
Athlete	Event	Time	Time	Time	Rank
Špela Bračun	Downhill			1:31.54	24
Špela Bračun	Super-G			1:20.29	30
Mojca Suhadolc	Super-G			1:19.66	24
Špela Pretnar	Giant Slalom	DNF	–	DNF	–
Nataša Bokal	Giant Slalom	1:22.86	1:35.60	2:58.46	20
Alenka Dovžan	Giant Slalom	1:22.57	1:34.78	2:57.35	17
Urška Hrovat	Giant Slalom	1:21.61	1:35.83	2:57.44	18
Alenka Dovžan	Slalom	47.95	48.71	1:36.66	16
Nataša Bokal	Slalom	47.72	47.87	1:35.59	11
Špela Pretnar	Slalom	47.11	DNF	DNF	–
Urška Hrovat	Slalom	47.02	DNF	DNF	–

== Biathlon ==
Men

Event	Athlete	Misses ^{1}	Time	Rank
10 km Sprint	Tomaž Žemva	1	30:32.1	42
10 km Sprint	Sašo Grajf	3	30:24.2	40
10 km Sprint	Tomaž Globočnik	3	30:04.4	33
10 km Sprint	Jože Poklukar	1	29:00.5	16

Event	Athlete	Time	Misses	Adjusted time ^{2}	Rank
20 km	Tomaž Žemva	57:27.0	8	1'05:27.0	61
20 km	Janez Ožbolt	1'00:18.9	5	1'05:18.9	58
20 km	Sašo Grajf	58:18.2	2	1'00:18.2	25
20 km	Tomaž Globočnik	56:55.5	2	58:55.5	11

Men's 4 × 7.5 km relay

Athletes	Race		
Athletes	Misses ^{1}	Time	Rank
Sašo Grajf; Jože Poklukar; Janez Ožbolt; Tomaž Globočnik	2	1'25:43.2	12

Women

Event	Athlete	Misses ^{1}	Time	Rank
7.5 km Sprint	Lucija Larisi	4	27:14.9	59
7.5 km Sprint	Tadeja Brankovič	3	25:20.1	36
7.5 km Sprint	Andreja Grašič	1	24:05.2	12

Event	Athlete	Time	Misses	Adjusted time ^{2}	Rank
15 km	Tadeja Brankovič	53:19.1	8	1'01:19.1	36
15 km	Lucija Larisi	55:05.8	6	1'01:05.8	35
15 km	Andreja Grašič	52:01.0	4	56:01.0	5

Women's 4 × 7.5 km relay

Athletes	Race		
Athletes	Misses ^{1}	Time	Rank
Lucija Larisi; Andreja Grašič; Matejka Mohorič; Tadeja Brankovič	3	1'44:18.8	9

^{1} A penalty loop of 150 metres had to be skied per missed target.
^{2} One minute added per missed target.

== Cross-country skiing ==
Women

Event	Athlete	Race	
Event	Athlete	Time	Rank
5 km C	Nataša Lačen	19:09.3	34
10 km pursuit^{2} F	Nataša Lačen	32:03.6	34
30 km F	Nataša Lačen	1'29:10.4	18

^{2} Starting delay based on 5 km results.
C = Classical style, F = Freestyle

== Figure skating ==
Women

Athlete	SP	FS	TFP	Rank
Mojca Kopač	22	23	34.0	23

== Freestyle skiing ==
Men

Athlete	Event	Qualification		Final	
Athlete	Event	Points	Rank	Points	Rank
Miha Gale	Aerials	154.68	22	did not advance	

== Nordic combined ==
Men's individual

Events:

- normal hill ski jumping
- 15 km cross-country skiing (Start delay, based on ski jumping results.)

Athlete	Event	Ski Jumping		Cross-country time	Total rank
Athlete	Event	Points	Rank	Cross-country time	Total rank
Roman Perko	Individual	180.0	46	49:07.4	41

== Ski jumping ==
Athlete	Event	Jump 1			Jump 2		Total	
Athlete	Event	Distance	Points	Rank	Distance	Points	Points	Rank
Urban Franc	Normal hill	74.0	79.5	42	did not advance			
Peter Žonta	Normal hill	74.0	80.5	39	did not advance			
Blaž Vrhovnik	Normal hill	74.5	81.0	38	did not advance			
Primož Peterka	Normal hill	87.0	109.0	9 Q	89.0	114.0	223.0	6
Miha Rihtar	Large hill	108.0	93.4	34	did not advance			
Peter Žonta	Large hill	114.5	105.1	23 Q	98.5	73.3	178.4	28
Blaž Vrhovnik	Large hill	116.0	107.3	20 Q	122.5	119.5	226.8	17
Primož Peterka	Large hill	119.0	115.2	8 Q	130.5	135.9	251.1	5

Men's team large hill

Athletes	Result	
Athletes	Points ^{1}	Rank
Miha Rihtar; Peter Žonta; Blaž Vrhovnik; Primož Peterka	610.3	10

^{1} Four teams members performed two jumps each.

== Snowboarding ==
Women's giant slalom

Athlete	Race 1	Race 2	Total	
Athlete	Time	Time	Time	Rank
Polona Zupan	1:16.90	DNF	DNF	–
