= Slovenia at the 2002 Winter Olympics =

- IOC code: SLO
- NOC: Olympic Committee of Slovenia
- Website: www.olympic.si (in Slovene and English)

in Salt Lake City
- Competitors: 40 (24 men, 16 women) in 8 sports
- Flag bearer: Dejan Košir (snowboarding)
- Medals Ranked 23rd: Gold 0 Silver 0 Bronze 1 Total 1

Winter Olympics appearances (overview)
- 1992; 1994; 1998; 2002; 2006; 2010; 2014; 2018; 2022; 2026

Other related appearances
- Yugoslavia (1924–1988)

Slovenia competed at the 2002 Winter Olympics in Salt Lake City, United States.

== Medalists ==
Medal	Name	Sport	Event
Bronze	Damjan Fras; Primož Peterka; Robert Kranjec; Peter Žonta	Ski Jumping	Men's Large Hill (K-120) Team Competition

== Alpine skiing ==
Men

Athlete	Event	Race 1	Race 2	Total	
Athlete	Event	Time	Time	Time	Rank
Jernej Koblar	Downhill			1:42.31	33
Gregor Šparovec	Downhill			1:41.88	31
Andrej Jerman	Downhill			1:41.85	28
Peter Pen	Downhill			1:41.66	23
Peter Pen	Super-G			DSQ	–
Andrej Jerman	Super-G			1:24.35	21
Jernej Koblar	Super-G			1:23.82	15
Gregor Šparovec	Super-G			1:23.52	13
Mitja Kunc	Giant Slalom	1:14.95	1:13.22	2:28.17	28
Jure Košir	Giant Slalom	1:14.10	DNF	DNF	–
Uroš Pavlovčič	Giant Slalom	1:14.01	DNF	DNF	–
Jernej Koblar	Giant Slalom	1:13.15	1:13.21	2:26.36	18
Mitja Kunc	Slalom	51.08	DNF	DNF	–
Rene Mlekuž	Slalom	50.57	DNF	DNF	–
Drago Grubelnik	Slalom	50.51	DNF	DNF	–
Jure Košir	Slalom	49.80	53.54	1:43.34	8

Men's combined

Athlete	Downhill	Slalom		Total	
Athlete	Time	Time 1	Time 2	Total time	Rank
Mitja Dragšič	DSQ	–	–	DSQ	–
Andrej Jerman	1:42.42	DNF	–	DNF	–
Jernej Koblar	1:41.70	48.42	53.35	3:23.47	9
Gregor Šparovec	1:40.42	DNF	–	DNF	–

Women

Athlete	Event	Race 1	Race 2	Total	
Athlete	Event	Time	Time	Time	Rank
Mojca Suhadolc	Downhill			1:43.10	28
Špela Bračun	Downhill			1:42.48	22
Špela Bračun	Super-G			1:16.35	24
Mojca Suhadolc	Super-G			1:15.90	21
Alenka Dovžan	Giant Slalom	DNF	–	DNF	–
Špela Pretnar	Giant Slalom	1:18.81	1:16.75	2:35.56	20
Tina Maze	Giant Slalom	1:17.16	1:16.20	2:33.36	12
Lea Dabič	Slalom	DNF	–	DNF	–
Alenka Dovžan	Slalom	55.73	56.92	1:52.65	17
Špela Pretnar	Slalom	55.16	58.93	1:54.09	20
Nataša Bokal	Slalom	55.02	54.92	1:49.94	9

== Biathlon ==
Men

Event	Athlete	Misses ^{1}	Time	Rank
10 km sprint	Sašo Grajf	2	27:52.6	59
10 km sprint	Janez Marič	2	27:28.6	44
10 km sprint	Marko Dolenc	1	26:47.0	27
10 km sprint	Tomaž Globočnik	1	26:40.0	23
12.5 km pursuit ^{2}	Sašo Grajf	3	37:38.9	46
12.5 km pursuit ^{2}	Janez Marič	5	36:51.4	38
12.5 km pursuit ^{2}	Marko Dolenc	4	36:06.1	29
12.5 km pursuit ^{2}	Tomaž Globočnik	0	34:42.6	19

Event	Athlete	Time	Misses	Adjusted time ^{3}	Rank
20 km	Janez Ožbolt	57:16.2	6	1'03:16.2	82
20 km	Janez Marič	51:51.9	5	56:51.9	43
20 km	Tomaž Globočnik	53:40.6	1	54:40.6	18
20 km	Marko Dolenc	51:45.8	2	53:45.8	13

Men's 4 × 7.5 km relay

Athletes	Race		
Athletes	Misses ^{1}	Time	Rank
Sašo Grajf; Tomaž Globočnik; Janez Marič; Marko Dolenc	4	1'28:23.6	10

Women

Event	Athlete	Misses ^{1}	Time	Rank
7.5 km sprint	Tadeja Brankovič	5	25:14.0	63
7.5 km sprint	Andreja Mali	1	22:45.5	27
7.5 km sprint	Lucija Larisi	1	22:44.7	26
7.5 km sprint	Andreja Grašič	1	21:55.6	10
10 km pursuit ^{4}	Andreja Mali	3	34:46.3	32
10 km pursuit ^{4}	Lucija Larisi	4	34:40.2	29
10 km pursuit ^{4}	Andreja Grašič	1	32:01.9	8

Event	Athlete	Time	Misses	Adjusted time ^{3}	Rank
15 km	Dijana Grudiček-Ravnikar	48:50.3	7	55:50.3	57
15 km	Andreja Grašič	47:06.4	8	55:06.4	56
15 km	Tadeja Brankovič	49:08.9	4	53:08.9	41
15 km	Lucija Larisi	49:12.1	2	51:12.1	25

Women's 4 × 7.5 km relay

Athletes	Race		
Athletes	Misses ^{1}	Time	Rank
Lucija Larisi; Andreja Grašič; Dijana Grudiček-Ravnikar; Tadeja Brankovič	0	1'30:18.0	6

^{1} A penalty loop of 150 metres had to be skied per missed target.
^{2} Starting delay based on 10 km sprint results.
^{3} One minute added per missed target.
^{4} Starting delay based on 7.5 km sprint results.

== Cross-country skiing ==
Men

Sprint

Athlete	Qualifying round		Quarter finals		Semi finals		Finals	
Athlete	Time	Rank	Time	Rank	Time	Rank	Time	Final rank
Matej Soklič	2:53.42	13 Q	2:57.1	3	did not advance			

Pursuit

Athlete	10 km C		10 km F pursuit^{1}	
Athlete	Time	Rank	Time	Final rank
Matej Soklič	28:20.7	48 Q	28:05.4	55

^{1} Starting delay based on 10 km C. results.
C = Classical style, F = Freestyle

Women

Sprint

Athlete	Qualifying round		Quarter finals		Semi finals		Finals	
Athlete	Time	Rank	Time	Rank	Time	Rank	Time	Final rank
Teja Gregorin	3:25.64	34	did not advance					
Nataša Lačen	3:24.90	32	did not advance					
Andreja Mali	3:15.75	7 Q	3:14.8	1 Q	3:19.8	4 QB	3:25.9	7

Pursuit

Athlete	5 km C		5 km F pursuit^{2}	
Athlete	Time	Rank	Time	Final rank
Teja Gregorin	14:20.7	42 Q	14:05.4	41
Nataša Lačen	14:14.7	36 Q	13:15.9	23
Petra Majdič	13:06.1	1 Q	12:18.3	7

Event	Athlete	Race	
Event	Athlete	Time	Rank
10 km C	Nataša Lačen	30:31.3	30
10 km C	Petra Majdič	29:03.9	8
15 km F	Nataša Lačen	43:05.0	32
30 km C	Petra Majdič	1'35:51.8	12

^{2} Starting delay based on 5 km C. results.
C = Classical style, F = Freestyle

4 × 5 km relay

Athletes	Race	
Athletes	Time	Rank
Petra Majdič; Teja Gregorin; Andreja Mali; Nataša Lačen	51:19.6	9

== Figure skating ==
Women

Athlete	Points	SP	FS	Rank
Mojca Kopač	31.5	19	22	22

== Freestyle skiing ==
Men

Athlete	Event	Qualification		Final	
Athlete	Event	Points	Rank	Points	Rank
Miha Gale	Aerials	193.20	17	did not advance	

== Nordic combined ==
Men's sprint

Events:

- large hill ski jumping
- 7.5 km cross-country skiing (Start delay, based on ski jumping results.)

Athlete	Ski Jumping		Cross-country time	Total rank
Athlete	Points	Rank	Cross-country time	Total rank
Andrej Jezeršek	100.1	27	17:52.8	12

Men's individual

Events:

- normal hill ski jumping
- 15 km cross-country skiing (Start delay, based on ski jumping results.)

Athlete	Ski Jumping		Cross-country time	Total rank
Athlete	Points	Rank	Cross-country time	Total rank
Andrej Jezeršek	223.5	19	42:02.9	13

== Ski jumping ==
Athlete	Event	Qualifying jump			Final jump 1			Final jump 2		Total	
Athlete	Event	Distance	Points	Rank	Distance	Points	Rank	Distance	Points	Points	Rank
Damjan Fras	Normal hill	87.5	108.0	23 Q	88.5	110.5	30 Q	90.5	114.5	225.0	28
Primož Peterka	Normal hill	93.0	122.0	2 Q	92.5	121.5	7 Q	91.5	119.0	240.5	10
Robert Kranjec	Normal hill	93.5	122.0	2 Q	91.5	117.5	14 Q	92.5	118.5	236.0	15
Peter Žonta	Normal hill	Pre-qualified			90.0	114.00	24 Q	95.0	125.5	239.5	13
Damjan Fras	Large hill	113.5	100.8	15 Q	123.0	119.9	15 Q	113.5	101.3	221.2	22
Primož Peterka	Large hill	116.0	105.3	9 Q	123.0	120.9	13 Q	119.5	112.1	233.0	15
Robert Kranjec	Large hill	122.0	119.1	1 Q	122.0	118.1	17 Q	122.5	119.5	237.6	11
Peter Žonta	Large hill	Pre-qualified			124.0	121.2	12 Q	120.0	113.0	234.2	13

Men's team large hill

Athletes	Result	
Athletes	Points ^{1}	Rank
Damjan Fras; Primož Peterka; Robert Kranjec; Peter Žonta	946.3	3rd place, bronze medalist(s)

^{1} Four teams members performed two jumps each.

== Snowboarding ==
Men's parallel giant slalom

Athlete	Qualifying		Round one	Quarter final	Semi final	Final	Rank
Athlete	Time	Rank	Round one	Quarter final	Semi final	Final	Rank
Tomaž Knafelj	DNF	–	did not advance				
Dejan Košir	36.71	5 Q	(Sweden) Stephen Copp W	(Sweden) Richard Richardsson L	did not advance		5
