= Biathlon at the 1998 Winter Olympics – Men's sprint =

Men's biathlon sprint at the XVIII Olympic Winter Games
- Venue: Nozawa Onsen
- Dates: 18 February 1998
- Competitors: 73 from 30 nations
- Winning time: 27:16.2

Medalists
1st place, gold medalist(s)		Ole Einar Bjørndalen	Norway
2nd place, silver medalist(s)		Frode Andresen	Norway
3rd place, bronze medalist(s)		Ville Räikkönen	Finland

The Men's 10 kilometre sprint biathlon competition at the 1998 Winter Olympics was held on 18 February 1998, at Nozawa Onsen. Competitors raced over two 3.0 kilometre loops and one 4.0 kilometre loop of the skiing course, shooting two times, once prone and once standing. Each miss was penalized by requiring the competitor to race over a 150-metre penalty loop.

== Results ==
Rank	Bib	Name	Country	Time	Penalties	Deficit
1st place, gold medalist(s)	37	Ole Einar Bjørndalen	Norway	27:16.2	0 (0+0)	–
2nd place, silver medalist(s)	61	Frode Andresen	Norway	28:17.8	2 (1+1)	+1:01.6
3rd place, bronze medalist(s)	73	Ville Räikkönen	Finland	28:21.7	1 (0+1)	+1:05.5
4	72	Viktor Maigourov	Russia	28:36.0	0 (0+0)	+1:19.8
5	64	Jēkabs Nākums	Latvia	28:36.9	1 (1+0)	+1:20.7
6	10	Oļegs Maļuhins	Latvia	28:37.4	1 (0+1)	+1:21.2
7	71	Frank Luck	Germany	28:40.3	1 (1+0)	+1:24.1
8	19	Halvard Hanevold	Norway	28:40.8	2 (1+1)	+1:24.6
9	53	Paavo Puurunen	Finland	28:44.0	0 (0+0)	+1:27.8
10	67	Pieralberto Carrara	Italy	28:44.2	2 (1+1)	+1:28.0
11	38	Ludwig Gredler	Austria	28:44.3	2 (0+2)	+1:28.1
12	14	Vladimir Drachev	Russia	28:46.4	1 (0+1)	+1:30.2
13	2	Egil Gjelland	Norway	28:49.1	1 (1+0)	+1:32.9
14	54	Wilfried Pallhuber	Italy	28:50.1	1 (1+0)	+1:33.9
15	45	Ivan Masařík	Czech Republic	28:58.6	2 (1+1)	+1:42.4
16	20	Jože Poklukar	Slovenia	29:00.5	1 (0+1)	+1:44.3
17	52	Ricco Groß	Germany	29:13.9	1 (0+1)	+1:57.7
18	24	Dimitri Borovik	Estonia	29:19.4	1 (0+1)	+2:03.2
19	45	Kyoji Suga	Japan	29:19.4	2 (0+2)	+2:03.2
20	18	Harri Eloranta	Finland	29:21.8	2 (1+1)	+2:05.6
21	46	Fredrik Kuoppa	Sweden	29:22.0	2 (0+2)	+2:05.8
22	51	Sergei Tarasov	Russia	29:23.2	3 (2+1)	+2:07.0
23	66	Wojciech Kozub	Poland	29:28.5	3 (2+1)	+2:12.3
24	15	Dmitry Pozdnyakov	Kazakhstan	29:30.1	0 (0+0)	+2:13.9
25	16	Mikael Löfgren	Sweden	29:31.6	1 (0+1)	+2:15.4
26	28	Wiesław Ziemianin	Poland	29:34.4	1 (0+1)	+2:18.2
27	41	Oleg Ryzhenkov	Belarus	29:38.2	2 (0+2)	+2:22.0
28	40	Tomasz Sikora	Poland	29:40.8	1 (1+0)	+2:24.6
29	11	Sven Fischer	Germany	29:47.1	2 (1+1)	+2:30.9
30	57	Ruslan Lysenko	Ukraine	29:49.6	0 (0+0)	+2:33.4
31	65	Valery Ivanov	Kazakhstan	29:58.8	5 (1+4)	+2:42.6
32	42	Ilmārs Bricis	Latvia	30:01.7	4 (2+2)	+2:45.5
33	39	Tomaž Globočnik	Slovenia	30:04.4	3 (1+2)	+2:48.2
34	1	Carsten Heymann	Germany	30:09.6	2 (0+2)	+2:53.4
35	9	Hubert Leitgeb	Italy	30:10.0	1 (1+0)	+2:53.8
36	58	Indrek Tobreluts	Estonia	30:11.3	3 (1+2)	+2:55.1
37	68	Alexei Aidarov	Belarus	30:12.3	2 (1+1)	+2:56.1
38	62	Wolfgang Perner	Austria	30:13.5	4 (2+2)	+2:57.3
39	12	Wolfgang Rottmann	Austria	30:16.0	2 (0+2)	+2:59.8
40	69	Aleksander Grajf	Slovenia	30:24.2	3 (2+1)	+3:08.0
41	47	Ľubomír Machyniak	Slovakia	30:30.3	1 (1+0)	+3:14.1
42	6	Tomaž Žemva	Slovenia	30:32.1	1 (0+1)	+3:15.9
43	26	Shuichi Sekiya	Japan	30:33.4	3 (3+0)	+3:17.2
44	33	Janno Prants	Estonia	30:33.4	3 (3+0)	+3:17.2
45	44	Andriy Deryzemlia	Ukraine	30:33.6	3 (1+2)	+3:17.4
46	25	Vadim Sashurin	Belarus	30:34.0	1 (1+0)	+3:17.8
47	32	Mike Dixon	Great Britain	30:34.4	0 (0+0)	+3:18.2
48	59	Steve Cyr	Canada	30:35.0	3 (3+0)	+3:18.8
49	70	Dan Westover	United States	30:39.5	1 (1+0)	+3:23.3
50	60	Thierry Dusserre	France	30:43.6	1 (1+0)	+3:27.4
51	21	Zdeněk Vítek	Czech Republic	30:46.5	2 (1+1)	+3:30.3
52	23	René Cattarinussi	Italy	30:50.0	4 (1+3)	+3:33.8
53	43	Petr Garabík	Czech Republic	30:51.3	3 (1+2)	+3:35.1
54	36	Dmitry Pantov	Kazakhstan	30:51.8	3 (2+1)	+3:35.6
55	4	Alexandr Popov	Belarus	30:53.0	2 (2+0)	+3:36.8
56	7	Aleksey Kobelev	Russia	31:02.8	4 (2+2)	+3:46.6
57	49	Georgi Kasabov	Bulgaria	31:09.5	0 (0+0)	+3:53.3
58	30	Thanasis Tsakiris	Greece	31:14.6	2 (1+1)	+3:58.4
59	55	Liutauras Barila	Lithuania	31:23.7	5 (4+1)	+4:07.5
60	31	Jay Hakkinen	United States	31:31.6	3 (1+2)	+4:15.4
61	63	Atsushi Kazama	Japan	31:41.1	6 (2+4)	+4:24.9
62	3	Reinhard Neuner	Austria	31:45.3	4 (1+3)	+4:29.1
63	48	János Panyik	Hungary	31:50.0	1 (1+0)	+4:33.8
64	8	Marius Ene	Romania	31:54.8	2 (2+0)	+4:38.6
65	27	Aleksandr Tropnikov	Kyrgyzstan	31:55.8	4 (3+1)	+4:39.6
66	35	Kevin Quintilio	Canada	32:32.6	3 (2+1)	+5:16.4
67	5	Julien Robert	France	32:52.4	0 (0+0)	+5:36.2
68	13	Mark Gee	Great Britain	33:00.3	5 (4+1)	+5:44.1
69	29	Andreas Heymann	France	33:06.9	2 (2+0)	+5:50.7
70	22	Jeon Jae-won	South Korea	35:09.5	6 (4+2)	+7:53.3
71	17	Ion Bucsa	Moldova	36:33.8	6 (2+4)	+9:17.6
	34	Raphaël Poirée	France	DNF	(4+ )	
	50	Jean-Marc Chabloz	Switzerland	DNF		
