= List of flag bearers for Slovenia at the Olympics =

Slovenia at the Olympics
- IOC code: SLO
- NOC: Slovenian Olympic Committee
- Website: www.olympic.si (in Slovene and English)
- Medals: Gold 16 Silver 19 Bronze 24 Total 59

Summer appearances
- 1992; 1996; 2000; 2004; 2008; 2012; 2016; 2020; 2024

Winter appearances
- 1992; 1994; 1998; 2002; 2006; 2010; 2014; 2018; 2022; 2026

Other related appearances
- Austria (1912); Yugoslavia (1920–1988)

This is a list of flag bearers, who have represented Slovenia at the Olympics.

Flag bearers carry the national flag of their country at the opening ceremony of the Olympic Games.

== List of flag bearers ==
Year	Season	Flag bearer(s)	Sport	Ref.
1992	Winter	Franci Petek	Ski jumping	
1992	Summer	Rajmond Debevec	Shooting	
1994	Winter	Jure Košir	Alpine skiing	
1996	Summer	Brigita Bukovec	Athletics	
1998	Winter	Primož Peterka	Ski jumping	
2000	Summer	Iztok Čop	Rowing	
2002	Winter	Dejan Košir	Snowboarding	
2004	Summer	Beno Lapajne	Handball	
2006	Winter	Tadeja Brankovič	Biathlon	
2008	Summer	Urška Žolnir	Judo	
2010	Winter	Tina Maze	Alpine skiing	
2012	Summer	Peter Kauzer	Canoeing	
2014	Winter	Tomaž Razingar	Ice hockey	
2016	Summer	Vasilij Žbogar	Sailing	
2018	Winter	Vesna Fabjan	Cross-country skiing	
2020	Summer	Eva Terčelj	Canoeing	
2020	Summer	Bojan Tokić	Table tennis	
2022	Winter	Ilka Štuhec	Alpine skiing	
2022	Winter	Rok Marguč	Snowboarding	
2024	Summer	Ana Gros	Handball	
2024	Summer	Benjamin Savšek	Canoeing	
2026	Winter	Nika Prevc	Ski jumping	
2026	Winter	Domen Prevc	Ski jumping	

== See also ==
- Slovenia at the Olympics
- List of flag bearers for Yugoslavia at the Olympics
