= Shannon Nobis =

American alpine skier (born 1972)

Shannon Nobis (born March 20, 1972) is a former American alpine skier who competed in the 1994 Winter Olympics.

She was a younger sister of fellow skier Jeremy Nobis.

At the 1994 Olympic Games, she finished 10th at the super-G. She competed at two World Championships in 1996 and 1997, recording a 15th place in the super-G in 1996.

Nobis entered the FIS Alpine Ski World Cup in January 1994, finishing 21st in the super-G race in Cortina d'Ampezzo. She broke into the top 10 for the first time in December 1994, finishing 6th in the super-G at Vail. Her first podium came in the same season, the 1994–95 World Cup circuit, as she finished 3rd in Garmisch-Partenkirchen in January 1995. Her last World Cup outing came in March 1997 at Mammoth Mountain, finishing 32nd in the super-G.

== Career highlights and Olympic performance ==
Shannon Nobis (born 20 March 1972 in Park City, Utah) is a former American alpine skier who competed in the 1994 Winter Olympics in Lillehammer, where she finished tenth in the women’s Super-G event. Earlier in February 1994, as a 21‑year‑old relative newcomer to the U.S. Olympic team, she expressed surprise at making the squad but embraced the challenge, asserting, “You ski with those people every day… you have to realize you can do it”. Nobis showed notable consistency on the World Cup circuit during the 1994–95 season, scoring her first top‑ten finish with a sixth place in Vail and achieving her lone World Cup podium—a third‑place finish in Garmisch‑Partenkirchen Super‑G in January 1995.
