= 1994–95 FIS Alpine Ski World Cup =

International sports competition

FIS Alpine Ski World Cup 1994/95
Discipline	Men	Women
Overall	(Italy) Alberto Tomba	(Switzerland) Vreni Schneider
Downhill	(France) Luc Alphand	(United States) Picabo Street
Super G	(Italy) Peter Runggaldier	(Germany) Katja Seizinger
Giant Slalom	(Italy) Alberto Tomba	(Switzerland) Vreni Schneider
Slalom	(Italy) Alberto Tomba	(Switzerland) Vreni Schneider
Nations Cup	Austria	Switzerland
- Nations Cup overall: Austria

Competition
Locations	14	15
Individual	32	32

The 29th World Cup season began in November 1994 in Park City, USA (December 1994 in Tignes, France for men), and concluded in March 1995 at the World Cup finals in Bormio, Italy. The overall champions were Alberto Tomba of Italy (his first) and Vreni Schneider of Switzerland (her third).

A break in the schedule was for the 1995 World Championships at Sierra Nevada in southern Spain. However, due to the lack of snow, these championships were postponed until 1996.

== Calendar ==
=== Men ===
Event Key: DH – Downhill, SL – Slalom, GS – Giant Slalom, SG – Super Giant Slalom, KB – Combined
Race	Season	Date	Place	Type	Winner	Second	Third
829	1	3 December 1994	(France) Tignes	GS _{214}	(Liechtenstein) Achim Vogt	(Switzerland) Michael von Grünigen	(Norway) Kjetil André Aamodt
830	2	4 December 1994	(France) Tignes	SL _{247}	(Italy) Alberto Tomba	(Austria) Michael Tritscher	(Sweden) Thomas Fogdö
831	3	11 December 1994	(France) Tignes	SG _{058}	(Austria) Patrick Ortlieb	(United States) Tommy Moe	(France) Luc Alphand
832	4	12 December 1994	(Italy) Sestriere	SL _{248}	(Italy) Alberto Tomba	(Sweden) Thomas Fogdö	(Austria) Michael Tritscher
833	5	16 December 1994	(France) Val d'Isère	DH _{245}	(Austria) Josef Strobl	(France) Luc Alphand	(Austria) Günther Mader
834	6	17 December 1994	(France) Val d'Isère	DH _{246}	(Austria) Armin Assinger	(Austria) Patrick Ortlieb	(Austria) Josef Strobl
835	7	18 December 1994	(France) Val d'Isère	GS _{215}	(Switzerland) Michael von Grünigen	(Norway) Kjetil André Aamodt	(Austria) Günther Mader
836	8	20 December 1994	(Austria) Lech am Arlberg	SL _{249}	(Italy) Alberto Tomba	(Austria) Thomas Sykora	(Slovenia) Jure Košir
837	9	21 December 1994	(Austria) Lech am Arlberg	SL _{250}	(Italy) Alberto Tomba	(Austria) Thomas Sykora	(Austria) Michael Tritscher
838	10	22 December 1994	(Italy) Alta Badia	GS _{216}	(Italy) Alberto Tomba	(Switzerland) Urs Kälin	(Austria) Christian Mayer
839	11	6 January 1995	(Slovenia) Kranjska Gora	GS _{217}	(Italy) Alberto Tomba	(Slovenia) Mitja Kunc (Norway) Harald Strand Nilsen	
840	12	8 January 1995	(Germany) Garmisch-Partenkirchen	SL _{251}	(Italy) Alberto Tomba	(Luxembourg) Marc Girardelli	(France) Yves Dimier
841	13	13 January 1995	(Austria) Kitzbühel	DH _{247}	(France) Luc Alphand	(Austria) Patrick Ortlieb	(Italy) Kristian Ghedina
842	14	14 January 1995	(Austria) Kitzbühel	DH _{248}	(France) Luc Alphand	(Austria) Armin Assinger	(Italy) Werner Perathoner
843	15	15 January 1995	(Austria) Kitzbühel	SL _{252}	(Italy) Alberto Tomba	(Slovenia) Jure Košir	(Norway) Ole Kristian Furuseth
844	16	15 January 1995	(Austria) Kitzbühel	KB _{068}	(Luxembourg) Marc Girardelli	(Norway) Harald Strand Nilsen	(Austria) Günther Mader
845	17	16 January 1995	(Austria) Kitzbühel	SG _{059}	(Austria) Günther Mader	(Italy) Peter Runggaldier	(Austria) Armin Assinger
846	18	20 January 1995	(Switzerland) Wengen	DH _{249}	(Italy) Kristian Ghedina	(Austria) Peter Rzehak	(Austria) Hannes Trinkl
847	19	21 January 1995	(Switzerland) Wengen	DH _{250}	(United States) Kyle Rasmussen	(Austria) Werner Franz	(Austria) Armin Assinger
848	20	22 January 1995	(Switzerland) Wengen	SL _{253}	(Italy) Alberto Tomba	(Switzerland) Michael von Grünigen	(Slovenia) Jure Košir
849	21	22 January 1995	(Switzerland) Wengen	KB _{069}	(Luxembourg) Marc Girardelli	(Norway) Lasse Kjus	(Norway) Harald Strand Nilsen
850	22	4 February 1995	(Switzerland) Adelboden	GS _{218}	(Italy) Alberto Tomba	(Slovenia) Jure Košir	(Norway) Harald Strand Nilsen
851	23	19 February 1995	(Japan) Furano	SL _{254}	(Austria) Michael Tritscher	(Austria) Mario Reiter	(Norway) Ole Kristian Furuseth
852	24	20 February 1995	(Japan) Furano	GS _{219}	(Austria) Mario Reiter	(Slovenia) Jure Košir	(Norway) Harald Strand Nilsen
853	25	25 February 1995	(Canada) Whistler	DH _{251}	(Italy) Kristian Ghedina	(Norway) Lasse Kjus	(Austria) Patrick Ortlieb
854	26	26 February 1995	(Canada) Whistler	SG _{060}	(Italy) Peter Runggaldier	(United States) A. J. Kitt	(Austria) Christian Greber
855	27	10 March 1995	(Norway) Lillehammer (Kvitfjell)	SG _{061}	(Italy) Werner Perathoner	(Italy) Kristian Ghedina	(United States) Kyle Rasmussen
856	28	11 March 1995	(Norway) Lillehammer (Kvitfjell)	DH _{252}	(United States) Kyle Rasmussen	(Italy) Kristian Ghedina	(Austria) Patrick Ortlieb
857	29	15 March 1995	(Italy) Bormio	DH _{253}	(France) Luc Alphand	(United States) A. J. Kitt	(Norway) Lasse Kjus
858	30	16 March 1995	(Italy) Bormio	SG _{062}	(Austria) Richard Kröll	(Italy) Peter Runggaldier	(Italy) Werner Perathoner
859	31	18 March 1995	(Italy) Bormio	GS _{220}	(Italy) Alberto Tomba	(Austria) Günther Mader	(Austria) Rainer Salzgeber
860	32	19 March 1995	(Italy) Bormio	SL _{255}	(Norway) Ole Kristian Furuseth	(Austria) Thomas Stangassinger	(France) Yves Dimier

=== Ladies ===
Event Key: DH – Downhill, SL – Slalom, GS – Giant Slalom, SG – Super Giant Slalom, KB – Combined
Race	Season	Date	Place	Type	Winner	Second	Third
770	1	26 November 1994	(United States) Park City	GS _{210}	(Switzerland) Heidi Zeller-Bähler	(Italy) Sabina Panzanini	(Switzerland) Vreni Schneider
771	2	27 November 1994	(United States) Park City	SL _{241}	(Switzerland) Vreni Schneider	(Switzerland) Martina Accola	(Sweden) Kristina Andersson
772	3	2 December 1994	(United States) Vail	DH _{205}	(United States) Hilary Lindh	(Italy) Isolde Kostner	(Germany) Katja Seizinger
773	4	3 December 1994	(United States) Vail	SG _{056}	(Austria) Sylvia Eder	(Austria) Veronika Stallmaier	(Switzerland) Heidi Zeller-Bähler
774	5	4 December 1994	(United States) Vail	GS _{211}	(Switzerland) Heidi Zeller-Bähler	(Switzerland) Vreni Schneider	(Norway) Marianne Kjørstad
775	6	9 December 1994	(Canada) Lake Louise	DH _{206}	(United States) Picabo Street	(United States) Hilary Lindh	(Germany) Katja Seizinger
776	7	10 December 1994	(Canada) Lake Louise	DH _{207}	(United States) Hilary Lindh	(France) Florence Masnada	(Switzerland) Heidi Zeller-Bähler
777	8	11 December 1994	(Canada) Lake Louise	SG _{057}	(Germany) Katja Seizinger	(Switzerland) Heidi Zeller-Bähler	(United States) Picabo Street
778	9	18 December 1994	(Italy) Sestriere	SL _{242}	(Switzerland) Vreni Schneider	(Sweden) Pernilla Wiberg	(France) Beatrice Filliol
779	10	21 December 1994	(Italy) Alta Badia	GS _{212}	(Italy) Sabina Panzanini	(Austria) Anita Wachter	(Italy) Deborah Compagnoni
780	11	30 December 1994	(France) Méribel	SL _{243}	(Slovenia) Urška Hrovat	(Switzerland) Vreni Schneider	(France) Leila Piccard
781	12	7 January 1995	(Austria) Haus im Ennstal	SG _{058}	(Austria) Anita Wachter	(Germany) Katja Seizinger	(Switzerland) Heidi Zeller-Bähler
782	13	8 January 1995	(Austria) Haus im Ennstal	GS _{213}	(Italy) Deborah Compagnoni	(Switzerland) Heidi Zeller-Bähler	(Switzerland) Vreni Schneider
783	14	10 January 1995	(Austria) Flachau	SG _{059}	(Austria) Renate Götschl	(Germany) Katja Seizinger	(Slovenia) Špela Pretnar
784	15	14 January 1995	(Germany) Garmisch-Partenkirchen	SG _{060}	(France) Florence Masnada	(United States) Picabo Street	(United States) Shannon Nobis
785	16	15 January 1995	(Germany) Garmisch-Partenkirchen	SL _{244}	(Germany) Martina Ertl	(Italy) Deborah Compagnoni	(Switzerland) Gabriela Zingre
786	17	20 January 1995	(Italy) Cortina d'Ampezzo	DH _{208}	(Germany) Michaela Gerg-Leitner	(United States) Picabo Street	(Germany) Katja Seizinger
787	18	22 January 1995	(Italy) Cortina d'Ampezzo	DH _{209}	(United States) Picabo Street	(Italy) Barbara Merlin	(Germany) Katja Seizinger
788	19	23 January 1995	(Italy) Cortina d'Ampezzo	GS _{214}	(Austria) Anita Wachter	(Switzerland) Vreni Schneider	(Slovenia) Špela Pretnar
789	20	17 February 1995	(Sweden) Åre	DH _{210}	(United States) Picabo Street	(Germany) Katja Seizinger	(Italy) Isolde Kostner
790	21	18 February 1995	(Sweden) Åre	GS _{215}	(Austria) Anita Wachter	(Switzerland) Vreni Schneider	(Italy) Deborah Compagnoni
791	22	25 February 1995	(Slovenia) Maribor	GS _{216}	(Germany) Martina Ertl	(Slovenia) Špela Pretnar	(Italy) Deborah Compagnoni
792	23	26 February 1995	(Slovenia) Maribor	SL _{245}	(Switzerland) Vreni Schneider	(Slovenia) Katja Koren	(Norway) Trude Gimle
793	24	5 March 1995	(Austria) Saalbach-Hinterglemm	DH _{211}	(United States) Picabo Street	(Russia) Varvara Zelenskaya (Italy) Isolde Kostner	
794	25	5 March 1995	(Austria) Saalbach-Hinterglemm	SG _{061}	(Switzerland) Heidi Zeller-Bähler	(Switzerland) Heidi Zurbriggen	(Germany) Martina Ertl
795	26	11 March 1995	(Switzerland) Lenzerheide	DH _{212}	(United States) Picabo Street	(Russia) Varvara Zelenskaya	(Austria) Renate Götschl
796	27	12 March 1995	(Switzerland) Lenzerheide	SL _{246}	(Sweden) Pernilla Wiberg	(Switzerland) Vreni Schneider	(Germany) Martina Ertl
797	28	12 March 1995	(Switzerland) Lenzerheide	KB _{061}	(Sweden) Pernilla Wiberg	(Switzerland) Vreni Schneider	(Germany) Martina Ertl
798	29	15 March 1995	(Italy) Bormio	DH _{213}	(United States) Picabo Street	(Russia) Varvara Zelenskaya	(Italy) Barbara Merlin
799	30	18 March 1995	(Italy) Bormio	GS _{217}	(Slovenia) Špela Pretnar	(Italy) Sabina Panzanini	(Slovenia) Urška Hrovat
800	31	19 March 1995	(Italy) Bormio	SG _{062}	(Germany) Katja Seizinger	(Austria) Renate Götschl	(France) Florence Masnada
801	32	19 March 1995	(Italy) Bormio	SL _{247}	(Switzerland) Vreni Schneider	(Sweden) Pernilla Wiberg	(Slovenia) Urška Hrovat

== Men ==
=== Overall ===
see complete table

In Men's Overall World Cup 1993/94 all results count. Alberto Tomba won the Overall World Cup with only twelve results - eleven wins and one fourth place.

Place	Name	Country	Total	DH	SG	GS	SL	KB
1	Alberto Tomba	Italy	1150	0	0	450	700	0
2	Günther Mader	Austria	775	221	250	212	32	60
3	Jure Košir	Slovenia	760	0	0	355	405	0
4	Marc Girardelli	Luxembourg	744	73	111	91	269	200
5	Kjetil André Aamodt	Norway	708	43	79	307	179	100
6	Lasse Kjus	Norway	665	227	47	212	54	125
7	Kristian Ghedina	Italy	644	473	126	29	0	16
8	Luc Alphand	France	609	484	96	0	0	29
9	Michael von Grünigen	Switzerland	578	0	0	296	282	0
10	Mario Reiter	Austria	559	0	0	218	341	0
11	Patrick Ortlieb	Austria	548	426	122	0	0	0
12	Armin Assinger	Austria	542	419	123	0	0	0
13	Harald Strand Nilsen	Norway	521	0	19	322	40	140
14	Michael Tritscher	Austria	509	0	0	32	477	0
15	Werner Perathoner	Italy	506	269	237	0	0	0
16	Ole Kristian Furuseth	Norway	466	0	0	65	401	0
17	Kyle Rasmussen	United States	436	288	148	0	0	0
18	Peter Runggaldier	Italy	403	71	332	0	0	0
19	Atle Skårdal	Norway	355	168	142	0	0	45
20	Richard Kröll	Austria	331	0	170	161	0	0

=== Downhill ===
see complete table

In Men's Downhill World Cup 1994/95 all results count. Josef Strobl was able to win his very first World Cup downhill race with start number 61.

Place	Name	Country	Total	5 (France)	6 (France)	13 (Austria)	14 (Austria)	18 (Switzerland)	19 (Switzerland)	25 (Canada)	28 (Norway)	29 (Italy)
1	Luc Alphand	France	484	80	36	100	100	36	12	20	-	100
2	Kristian Ghedina	Italy	473	20	4	60	24	100	45	100	80	40
3	Patrick Ortlieb	Austria	426	50	80	80	36	-	15	60	60	45
4	Armin Assinger	Austria	419	9	100	4	80	45	60	40	45	36
5	Josef Strobl	Austria	307	100	60	-	14	40	40	9	26	18
6	Kyle Rasmussen	United States	288	-	16	-	-	26	100	24	100	22
7	Hannes Trinkl	Austria	273	-	40	45	-	60	50	22	36	20
8	Werner Perathoner	Italy	269	36	32	-	60	29	4	36	40	32
9	Lasse Kjus	Norway	227	24	26	-	2	6	29	80	-	60
10	Jean-Luc Crétier	France	224	40	29	20	26	13	-	50	22	24

=== Super G ===
see complete table

In Men's Super G World Cup 1994/95 all results count. Peter Runggaldier won the cup with only one race win. All races were won by a different athlete.

Place	Name	Country	Total	3 (France)	17 (Austria)	26 (Canada)	27 (Norway)	30 (Italy)
1	Peter Runggaldier	Italy	332	36	80	100	26	80
2	Günther Mader	Austria	250	24	100	45	45	36
3	Werner Perathoner	Italy	237	32	45	-	100	60
4	Richard Kröll	Austria	170	12	40	-	18	100
5	Kyle Rasmussen	United States	148	29	3	6	60	50
	Atle Skårdal	Norway	142	50	14	16	22	40
7	Kristian Ghedina	Italy	126	14	4	12	80	16
8	Armin Assinger	Austria	123	24	60	10	29	-
9	Patrick Ortlieb	Austria	122	100	-	7	15	-
10	Marc Girardelli	Luxembourg	111	-	26	32	24	29

=== Giant Slalom ===
see complete table

In Men's Giant Slalom World Cup 1994/95 all results count. Alberto Tomba won his fourth Giant Slalom World Cup.

Place	Name	Country	Total	1 (France)	7 (France)	10 (Italy)	11 (Slovenia)	22 (Switzerland)	24 (Japan)	31 (Italy)
1	Alberto Tomba	Italy	450	50	-	100	100	100	-	100
2	Jure Košir	Slovenia	355	40	36	29	50	80	80	40
3	Harald Strand Nilsen	Norway	322	24	29	45	80	60	60	24
4	Kjetil André Aamodt	Norway	307	60	80	50	-	22	45	50
5	Michael von Grünigen	Switzerland	296	80	100	-	22	32	36	26
6	Urs Kälin	Switzerland	288	45	50	80	40	29	24	20
7	Achim Vogt	Liechtenstein	226	100	24	8	26	36	32	-
8	Mario Reiter	Austria	218	36	-	10	36	14	100	22
9	Günther Mader	Austria	212	26	60	14	20	12	-	80
	Lasse Kjus	Norway	212	-	50	36	-	40	50	36

=== Slalom ===
see complete table

In Men's Slalom World Cup 1994/95 all results count. Alberto Tomba won his fourth Slalom World Cup by winning the first seven races in a row. Together with the last two slalom races last season 1993/94, he won 9 slalom races in a row.

Place	Name	Country	Total	2 (France)	4 (Italy)	8 (Austria)	9 (Austria)	12 (Germany)	15 (Austria)	20 (Switzerland)	23 (Japan)	32 (Italy)
1	Alberto Tomba	Italy	700	100	100	100	100	100	100	100	-	-
2	Michael Tritscher	Austria	477	80	60	50	60	50	45	32	100	-
3	Jure Košir	Slovenia	405	-	50	60	40	45	80	60	50	20
4	Ole Kristian Furuseth	Norway	401	50	26	36	45	24	60	-	60	100
5	Mario Reiter	Austria	341	26	36	22	29	40	50	36	80	22
6	Thomas Sykora	Austria	302	24	32	80	80	-	36	-	-	50
7	Michael von Grünigen	Switzerland	282	45	24	45	-	-	12	80	36	40
8	Sébastien Amiez	France	279	-	40	29	36	36	40	24	45	29
9	Thomas Fogdö	Sweden	269	60	80	-	50	-	29	50	-	-
	Marc Girardelli	Luxembourg	269	4	-	18	32	80	24	26	40	45

=== Combined ===
see complete table

In Men's Combined World Cup 1994/95 both results count. Marc Girardelli won his fourth Combined World Cup.

Place	Name	Country	Total	16 (Austria)	21 (Switzerland)
1	Marc Girardelli	Luxembourg	200	100	100
2	Harald Strand Nilsen	Norway	140	80	60
3	Lasse Kjus	Norway	125	45	80
4	Kjetil André Aamodt	Norway	100	50	50
5	Espen Hellerud	Norway	72	40	32
6	Günther Mader	Austria	60	60	-
	Jean-Luc Crétier	France	60	36	24
8	Atle Skårdal	Norway	45	-	45
9	Paul Accola	Switzerland	40	-	40
10	Ed Podivinsky	Canada	36	-	36

== Ladies ==
=== Overall ===
see complete table

In Women's Overall World Cup 1993/94 all results count. Vreni Schneider won her third Overall World Cup with only six points margin. Katja Seizinger was unable to score points only in one event (the slalom at Garmisch-Partenkirchen).

Place	Name	Country	Total	DH	SG	GS	SL	KB
1	Vreni Schneider	Switzerland	1248	84	74	450	560	80
2	Katja Seizinger	Germany	1242	445	446	206	95	50
3	Heidi Zeller	Switzerland	1044	242	366	420	0	16
4	Martina Ertl	Germany	985	77	237	333	278	60
5	Picabo Street	United States	905	709	196	0	0	0
6	Pernilla Wiberg	Sweden	816	201	140	20	355	100
7	Špela Pretnar	Slovenia	669	0	119	352	158	40
8	Anita Wachter	Austria	593	54	128	295	116	0
9	Hilary Lindh	United States	549	493	56	0	0	0
10	Urška Hrovat	Slovenia	535	0	0	260	275	0
11	Michaela Gerg	Germany	532	262	158	112	0	0
12	Deborah Compagnoni	Italy	524	0	74	325	125	0
13	Varvara Zelenskaya	Russia	511	416	95	0	0	0
14	Renate Götschl	Austria	509	236	245	0	28	0
15	Heidi Zurbriggen	Switzerland	503	252	251	0	0	0
16	Marianne Kjørstad	Norway	454	0	28	177	204	45
17	Barbara Merlin	Italy	443	304	98	19	0	22
18	Michaela Dorfmeister	Austria	434	195	117	93	0	29
19	Florence Masnada	France	421	205	198	18	0	0
20	Isolde Kostner	Italy	390	310	53	27	0	0

=== Downhill ===
see complete table

In the Women's Downhill World Cup 1994/95 all results counted. Picabo Street won six races and five of them in a row. Together with Hilary Lindh, they won nine out of 10 races for the United States.

Place	Name	Country	Total	1 (United States)	6 (Canada)	7 (Canada)	17 (Italy)	18 (Italy)	20 (Sweden)	24 (Austria)	26 (Switzerland)	29 (Italy)
1	Picabo Street	United States	709	-	29	100	80	100	100	100	100	100
2	Hilary Lindh	United States	493	100	100	80	40	20	40	18	45	50
3	Katja Seizinger	Germany	445	60	26	60	60	60	80	40	50	45
4	Varvara Zelenskaya	Russia	416	26	40	36	7	45	22	80	80	80
5	Isolde Kostner	Italy	310	80	-	-	50	16	60	80	-	24
6	Barbara Merlin	Italy	304	-	22	50	24	80	26	13	29	60
7	Michaela Gerg	Germany	262	11	1	7	100	26	9	36	32	40
8	Heidi Zurbriggen	Switzerland	252	45	18	15	22	32	50	12	26	32
9	Heidi Zeller	Switzerland	242	29	60	16	18	22	32	7	36	22
10	Renate Götschl	Austria	236	-	-	11	45	50	20	50	60	-

=== Super G ===
see complete table

In Women's Super G World Cup 1994/95 all results count. Katja Seizinger won her third Super G World Cup in a row.

Place	Name	Country	Total	4 (United States)	8 (Canada)	12 (Austria)	14 (Austria)	15 (Germany)	25 (Austria)	30 (Italy)
1	Katja Seizinger	Germany	446	26	100	80	80	45	15	100
2	Heidi Zeller	Switzerland	366	60	80	60	10	24	100	32
3	Heidi Zurbriggen	Switzerland	251	10	24	40	29	32	80	36
4	Renate Götschl	Austria	245	13	12	-	100	40	-	80
5	Martina Ertl	Germany	237	22	60	24	15	16	60	40
6	Sylvia Eder	Austria	230	100	8	32	36	14	40	-
7	Florence Masnada	France	198	-	5	22	-	100	11	60
8	Picabo Street	United States	196	36	60	-	20	80	-	-
9	Régine Cavagnoud	France	165	12	36	29	18	26	24	20
10	Alexandra Meissnitzer	Austria	163	32	20	7	50	18	36	-
11	Michaela Gerg	Germany	158	-	29	50	14	15	-	50
12	Shannon Nobis	United States	144	40	-	-	26	60	18	-
13	Pernilla Wiberg	Sweden	140	18	32	15	13	6	32	24
14	Anita Wachter	Austria	128	3	3	100	22	-	-	-

=== Giant Slalom ===
see complete table

In Women's Giant Slalom World Cup 1994/95 all results count. Vreni Schneider won her fifth Giant Slalom World Cup. But this time she was unable to win a single competition.

Place	Name	Country	Total	1 (United States)	5 (United States)	10 (Italy)	13 (Austria)	19 (Italy)	21 (Sweden)	22 (Slovenia)	31 (Italy)
1	Vreni Schneider	Switzerland	450	60	80	29	60	80	80	32	29
2	Heidi Zeller	Switzerland	420	100	100	40	80	45	45	10	-
3	Špela Pretnar	Slovenia	352	14	-	22	26	60	50	80	100
4	Martina Ertl	Germany	333	40	-	50	40	50	13	100	40
5	Deborah Compagnoni	Italy	325	-	-	60	100	-	60	60	45
6	Sabina Panzanini	Italy	310	80	32	100	-	-	18	-	80
7	Anita Wachter	Austria	295	-	15	80	-	100	100	-	-
8	Urška Hrovat	Slovenia	260	26	45	36	14	-	29	50	60
9	Katja Seizinger	Germany	206	20	29	20	45	36	14	18	24
10	Birgit Heeb	Liechtenstein	196	50	50	13	22	29	-	-	32

=== Slalom ===
see complete table

In Women's Slalom World Cup 1995/96 all results count. Vreni Schneider won her sixth Slalom World Cup, the last four of them in a row.

Place	Name	Country	Total	2 (United States)	9 (Italy)	11 (France)	16 (Germany)	23 (Slovenia)	27 (Switzerland)	32 (Italy)
1	Vreni Schneider	Switzerland	560	100	100	80	-	100	80	100
2	Pernilla Wiberg	Sweden	355	50	80	45	-	-	100	80
3	Martina Ertl	Germany	278	20	13	40	100	45	60	-
4	Urška Hrovat	Slovenia	275	14	29	100	-	50	22	60
5	Kristina Andersson	Sweden	247	60	36	20	45	10	36	40
6	Leïla Piccard	France	222	29	-	60	32	40	29	32
7	Patricia Chauvet	France	212	45	40	36	40	18	13	20
8	Marianne Kjørstad	Norway	204	36	26	-	36	32	50	24
9	Gabriela Zingre	Switzerland	180	-	6	26	60	26	26	36
10	Katja Koren	Slovenia	171	-	-	22	24	80	-	45

=== Combined ===
see complete table

In Women's Combined World Cup 1994/95 only one competition was held.

Place	Name	Country	Total	28 (Switzerland)
1	Pernilla Wiberg	Sweden	100	100
2	Vreni Schneider	Switzerland	80	80
3	Martina Ertl	Germany	60	60
4	Katja Seizinger	Germany	50	50
5	Marianne Kjørstad	Norway	45	45
6	Špela Pretnar	Slovenia	40	40
7	Stefanie Schuster	Austria	36	36
8	Hilde Gerg	Germany	32	32
9	Michaela Dorfmeister	Austria	29	29
10	Alenka Dovžan	Slovenia	26	26

== Nations Cup ==
Place	Country	Total	Men	Ladies
1	Austria	8862	5884	2978
2	Switzerland	6015	2157	3858
3	Italy	5965	3757	2208
4	Norway	4387	3137	1250
5	Germany	3894	386	3508
6	France	3885	1976	1909
7	United States	3375	1233	2142
8	Slovenia	2887	1106	1781
9	Sweden	1969	581	1388
10	Canada	764	486	278
11	Luxembourg	744	744	0
12	Russia	652	0	652
13	Liechtenstein	449	585	197
14	New Zealand	154	0	154
15	Japan	150	150	0
16	Spain	113	0	113
17	Finland	81	81	0
18	United Kingdom	22	22	0

=== Men ===
Place	Country	Total	DH	SG	GS	SL	KB	Racers	Wins
1	Austria	5884	2102	915	1022	1785	60	23	7
2	Italy	3757	1165	1024	667	885	16	23	15
3	Norway	3137	513	305	969	868	482	11	1
4	Switzerland	2157	572	227	880	438	40	19	1
5	France	1976	872	181	254	558	111	16	3
6	United States	1233	696	428	33	32	44	10	2
7	Slovenia	1106	0	16	468	622	0	7	0
8	Luxembourg	744	73	111	91	269	200	1	2
9	Sweden	581	0	134	156	291	0	4	0
10	Canada	486	264	56	14	96	56	10	0
11	Germany	386	75	24	113	174	0	7	0
12	Liechtenstein	252	5	21	226	0	0	3	1
13	Japan	150	0	0	0	150	0	2	0
14	Finland	81	0	36	0	45	0	2	0
15	United Kingdom	22	22	0	0	0	0	1	0

=== Ladies ===
Place	Country	Total	DH	SG	GS	SL	KB	Racers	Wins
1	Switzerland	3858	785	711	1305	961	96	14	7
2	Germany	3508	930	1201	781	439	157	11	5
3	Austria	2978	838	1049	562	464	65	18	5
4	Italy	2208	807	301	713	365	22	14	2
5	United States	2142	1388	473	161	120	0	10	8
6	France	1909	557	471	262	619	0	11	1
7	Slovenia	1781	30	247	794	644	66	6	2
8	Sweden	1388	201	140	208	739	100	5	2
9	Norway	1250	102	242	517	300	89	13	0
10	Russia	652	536	98	0	0	18	3	0
11	Canada	278	213	15	0	50	0	6	0
12	Liechtenstein	197	0	1	196	0	0	1	0
13	New Zealand	154	0	0	0	154	0	2	0
14	Spain	113	0	0	111	2	0	3	0
