= Bračun =

Bračun is a surname. The Croatian census of 2011 listed it as the most common surname in Nova Bukovica and one of the most common surnames in Hum na Sutli.

Notable people with the surname include:

- Milivoj Bračun, a Croatian footballer and manager
- Špela Bračun, a Slovenian alpine skier
