= Jean-Luc Crétier =

French alpine skier (born 1966)

Medal record

Men's alpine skiing

Representing France

Olympic Games
Gold medal – first place	1998 Nagano	Downhill

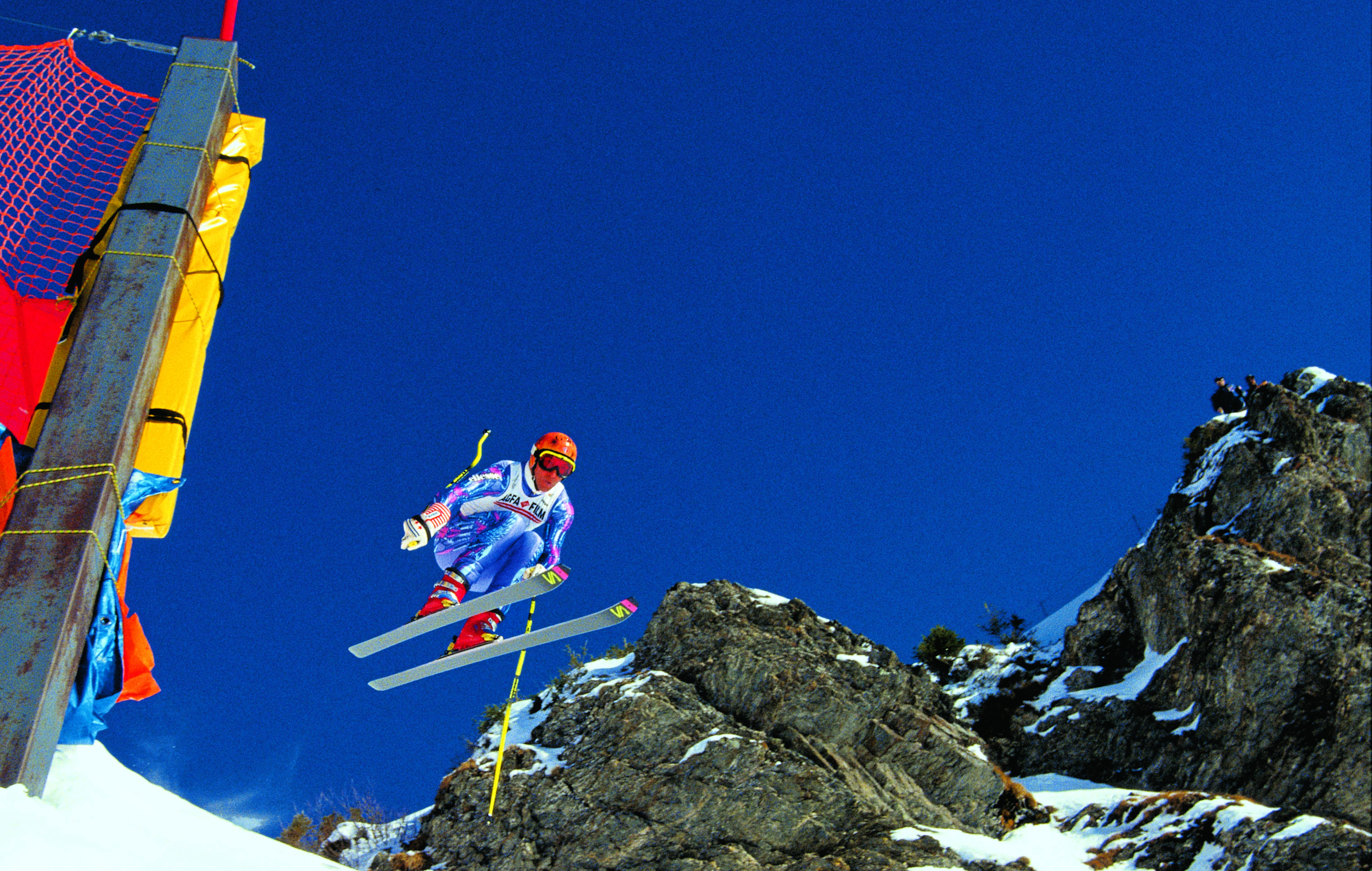
Jean-Luc Crétier at the Lauberhorn downhill 1995

Jean-Luc Crétier (born 28 April 1966 in Albertville, Savoie) is a retired French World Cup alpine ski racer. He was one of the four members of the "Top Guns" team, created and trained by Serge Guillaume outside the mainstream of the French Alpine Ski Federation, along with Luc Alphand, Franck Piccard, and Denis Rey.

At age 31, Crétier won the gold medal in the downhill at the 1998 Winter Olympics in Nagano. He was the fourth Frenchman to win the Olympic downhill, but the first in thirty years, since Jean-Claude Killy in 1968.

It was the only victory of Crétier's international career; however, he achieved five World Cup podium finishes, three in the two months prior to his Olympic title.

Crétier finished fourth in the combined event at the 1992 Winter Olympics in his hometown of Albertville. His final World Cup race was just ten months after Nagano; he incurred a career-ending knee injury at Val Gardena in December 1998.

== World Cup results ==
=== Season standings ===
Season	Age	Overall	Slalom	Giant slalom	Super-G	Downhill	Combined
1989	22	44	34	—	—	—	7
1990	23	59	—	—	18	—	—
1991	24	61	—	—	18	—	—
1992	25	55	—	—	19	—	13
1993	26	97	—	—	39	50	—
1994	27	38	—	—	—	13	—
1995	28	25	—	—	44	10	6
1996	29	94	—	—	—	36	—
1997	30	62	—	—	30	29	—
1998	31	18	—	—	27	5	—
1999	32	68	—	—	26	39	—

=== Race podiums ===
- 0 wins
- 5 podiums - (5 DH), 25 top tens

Season	Date	Location	Discipline	Place
1994	18 Dec 1993	Val Gardena, Italy	Downhill	3rd
1994	29 Jan 1994	Chamonix, France	Downhill	2nd
1998	4 Dec 1997	(United States) Beaver Creek, USA	Downhill	2nd
1998	17 Jan 1998	Wengen, Switzerland	Downhill	2nd
1998	23 Jan 1998	Kitzbühel, Austria	Downhill	3rd

== World Championship results ==
Year	Age	Slalom	Giant slalom	Super-G	Downhill	Combined
1991	24	—	—	11	—	—
1993	26	—	—	—	—	—
1996	29	—	—	—	35	16
1997	30	—	—	—	15	13

- The Super-G in 1993 was cancelled after multiple weather delays.

== Olympic results ==
Year	Age	Slalom	Giant slalom	Super-G	Downhill	Combined
1988	21	DSQ1	—	—	—	6
1992	25	—	—	24	—	4
1994	27	—	—	—	24	—
1998	31	—	—	25	1	—
