= 1995 World Cup =

1995 World Cup may refer to:

- 1995 FIFA Women's World Cup, held in Sweden for women's football (soccer)
- 1995 Rugby League World Cup, held in England and Wales for rugby league
- 1995 Rugby World Cup, held in South Africa for rugby union
- 1994–95 FIS Alpine Ski World Cup, held in USA, France and Italy for alpine skiing
