= Polona Klemenčič =

Slovenian biathlete (born 1997)

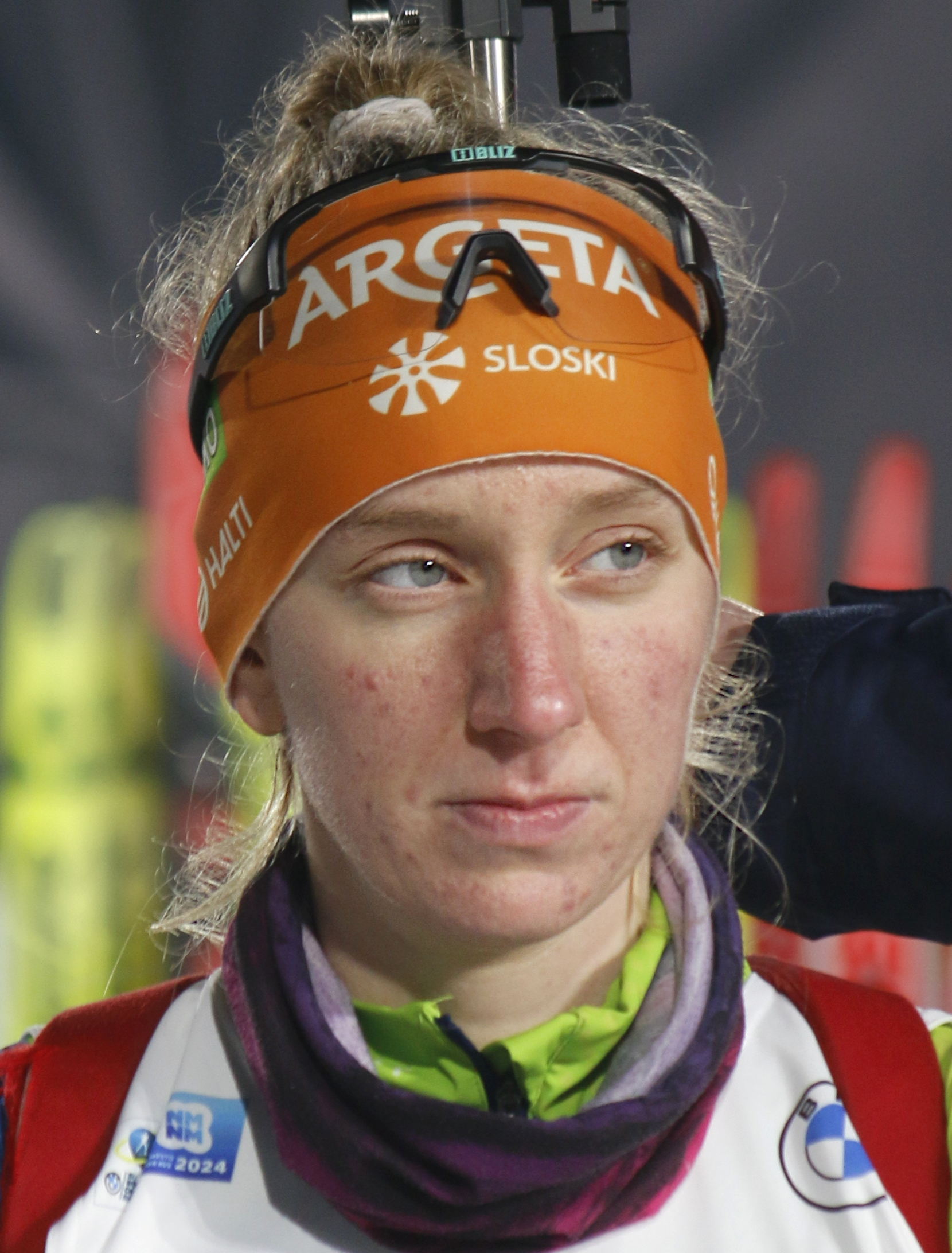

Personal information
- Nationality: Slovenian
- Born: 16 April 1997 (age 29) Kranj, Slovenia

Sport
- Country: Slovenia
- Sport: Biathlon

Polona Klemenčič (born 16 April 1997) is a Slovenian biathlete. She has competed in the Biathlon World Cup since 2018.

== Career ==
Klemenčič competed for Slovenia at the 2022 Winter Olympics in Beijing. Her best result was 20th place in the mixed relay and 29th place in individual race. She has competed at the World Championships six times, with a best finish of 7th place in the single mixed relay in 2023 and 8th place in the sprint in the Oberhof.

== Personal life ==
Her cousin Živa Klemenčič is also a biathlete.

== Biathlon results ==
All results are sourced from the International Biathlon Union.

=== Olympic Games ===
Event	Individual	Sprint	Pursuit	Mass start	Relay	Mixed relay
(China) 2022 Beijing	29th	59th	51st	—	—	20th
(Italy) 2026 Milano Cortina	38th	25th	28th	—	16th	13th

=== World Championships ===
Event	Individual	Sprint	Pursuit	Mass start	Relay	Mixed relay	Single mixed relay
(Austria) 2017 Hochfilzen	—	—	—	—	17th	—	N/A
(Sweden) 2019 Östersund	81st	77th	—	—	23rd	25th	—
(Italy) 2020 Antholz	91st	—	—	—	19th	—	—
(Slovenia) 2021 Pokljuka	84th	76th	—	—	19th	16th	13th
(Germany) 2023 Oberhof	46th	8th	22nd	19th	12th	12th	7th
(Czech Republic) 2024 Nové Město	45th	44th	48th	—	13th	9th	18th
(Switzerland) 2025 Lenzerheide	17th	30th	37th	25th	8th	—	—
