= Ville Räikkönen =

Finnish biathlete (born 1972)

Medal record

Men's biathlon

Representing Finland

Olympic Games
Bronze medal – third place	1998 Nagano	10 km sprint

Ville Räikkönen (born 14 February 1972 in Tuusula) is a Finnish former biathlete. He is the second cousin of 2007 Formula One World Champion Kimi Räikkönen.

== Career ==
- Olympics
- 1998 - bronze medal on the sprint
