= Picabo Street =

American alpine skier

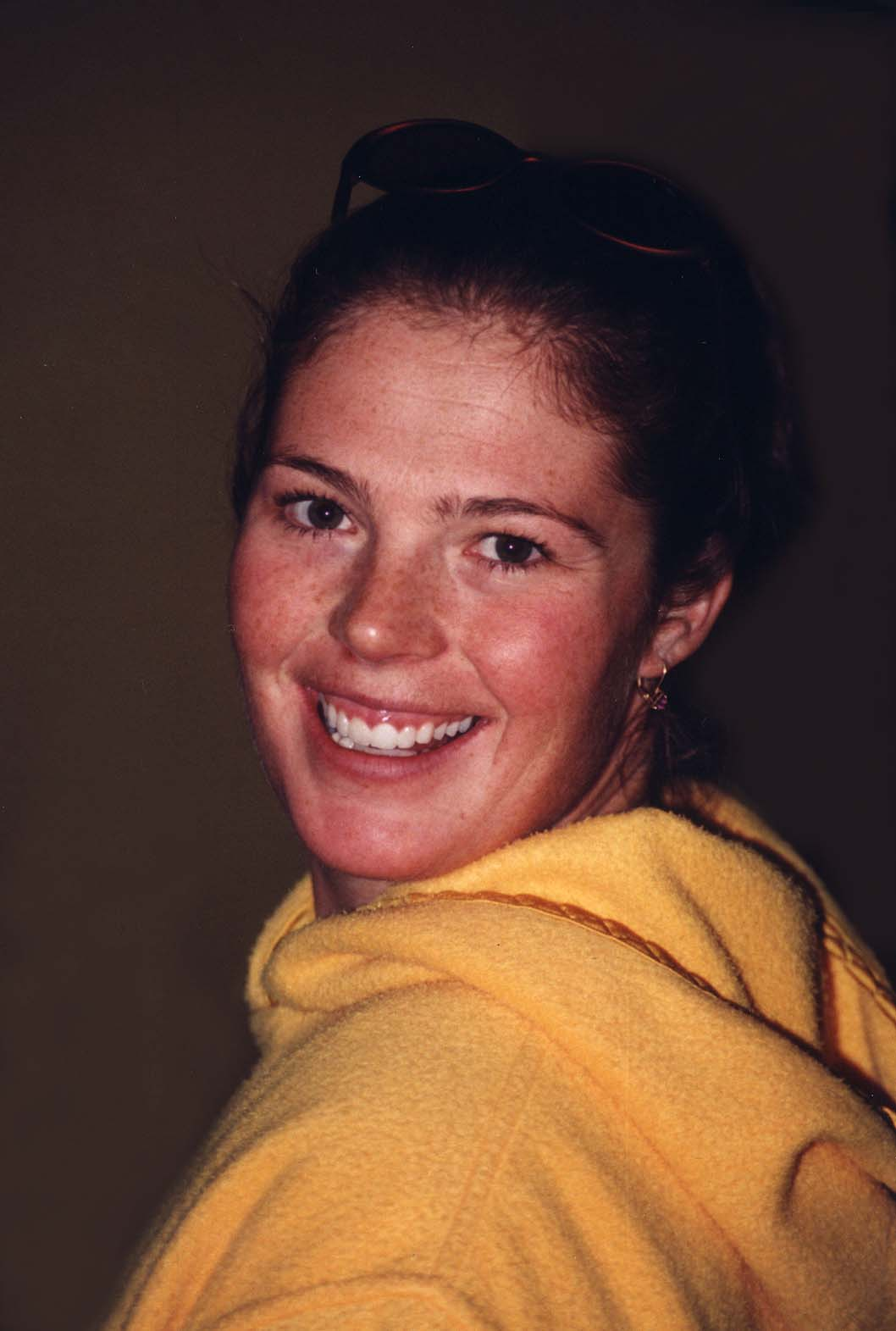
- Picabo Street in October 1999

Personal information
- Born: April 3, 1971 (age 55) Triumph, Idaho, U.S.
- Height: 5 ft 7 in (1.70 m)

Skiing career
- Sport: Alpine skiing
- Retired: February 2002 (age 30)
- Disciplines: Downhill, Super-G, Combined
- World Cup debut: December 6 1992 (age 21)

Olympics
- Teams: 3 – (1994, 1998, 2002)
- Medals: 2 (1 gold)

World Championships
- Teams: 2 – (1993, 1996)
- Medals: 3 (1 gold)

World Cup
- Seasons: 8 – (1993 -2002) (injured 1999, 2000)
- Wins: 9 – (9 DH)
- Podiums: 17 – (15 DH, 2 SG)
- Overall titles: 0 – (5th, 1995)
- Discipline titles: 2 – (DH: 1995, 1996)
Medal record
Women's alpine skiing
Representing the United States
Olympic Games
Gold medal – first place	1998 Nagano	Super-G
Silver medal – second place	1994 Lillehammer	Downhill
World Championships
Gold medal – first place	1996 Sierra Nevada	Downhill
Silver medal – second place	1993 Morioka	Combined
Bronze medal – third place	1996 Sierra Nevada	Super-G

Picabo Street (/ˈpiːkəbuː/; born April 3, 1971) is an American former World Cup alpine ski racer and Olympic gold medalist. She won the super G at the 1998 Winter Olympics and the downhill at the 1996 World Championships, along with three other Olympic and World Championship medals. Street also won World Cup downhill season titles in 1995 and 1996, the first American woman to do so, along with nine World Cup downhill race wins. Street was inducted into the National Ski Hall of Fame in 2004.

== Early life ==
Street was born at home in Triumph, Idaho; her parents are Dee (a music teacher) and Roland "Stubby" Street (a stonemason). Her brother Roland, Jr. is one year older. Her parents decided to let their daughter choose her own name when she was old enough, so for the first two years of her life she was called "baby girl" or "little girl". At age three she was required to have a name in order to get a passport. She was named after the nearby village of Picabo. She was raised on a small farm in Triumph, several miles southeast of Sun Valley, where she learned to ski and race.

She attended Rowland Hall-St. Mark's School in Salt Lake City, Utah, and participated in its Rowmark Ski Academy for one year before returning to Sun Valley to race for the Sun Valley Ski Education Foundation. Before joining the academy, she was a member of the local Hailey Ski Team.

== Skiing career ==
Street joined the U.S. Ski Team in 1989 at the age of 17. She primarily competed in the speed events of downhill and super G, with her World Cup debut at age 21 in a slalom on December 6 1992. Two months later at the 1993 World Championships in Japan she won the silver medal in the combined event.

=== 1994–1996 ===
After her silver medal performance in the downhill at the 1994 Winter Olympics, a run was named after her at Sun Valley, on the Warm Springs side of Bald Mountain; the expert run formerly known as "Plaza" became "Picabo's Street." Street joined Christin Cooper and Gretchen Fraser as Sun Valley Olympic medalists (their named runs are on Seattle Ridge).

By winning the 1995 downhill title, she became the first American to win a World Cup season title in a speed event. She repeated as downhill champion the following season, adding the title of world champion with her gold medal at the 1996 World Championships in Sierra Nevada, Spain.

=== 1997–2002 ===
While training in Colorado in early December 1996, Street suffered an ACL injury to her left knee and missed the remainder of the 1997 season. A month after her gold medal win in the super G at the 1998 Winter Olympics, she careened off course at the final downhill of the 1998 season at Crans-Montana, Switzerland. Street crashed, snapping her left femur and tearing the ACL in her right knee. She was in rehabilitation for two years following the accident.

Street returned to ski racing in late 2000, and retired from international competition after the 2002 Winter Olympics in Utah, where she finished sixteenth in the downhill.

== Commercial endeavors ==
Street appeared on the TV shows Nickelodeon GUTS in 1994, and Pyramid (2002). She performed well on the show American Gladiators, where Street used her strength to defeat the gladiator character "Ice" in a couple of events.

In the late 1990s, after her success at the 1998 Winter Olympics, Street became a spokeswoman for a variety of products, including the soft drink Mountain Dew and ChapStick-brand lip balm.

In 1998 she signed with Giro Sport Design which was then developing its first winter sports helmet. In August she toured the company's headquarters/manufacturing facility, then located in Santa Cruz, CA. She spoke with the senior manufacturing engineer, a long-time skier himself, about the progression of equipment, signing a prototype helmet for him as she left. She also appeared on Celebrity Paranormal Project.

She wrote an autobiography in 2001 titled Picabo: Nothing to Hide (ISBN 0-07-140693-X). In it, Street revealed the pressure placed on her by her sponsors to succeed and win, which she maintains contributed to her devastating 1998 crash. She also described how she was able to transform from a rebellious tomboy into a world-class athlete.

A feature film based on Street's life story was in development as of late 2009, written by Eric Preston with director Charles Winkler slated to direct, and produced by Jeff Luini and Richard Weiner. Filming was slated begin in 2010 in Argentina.

She appeared in two skits on Sesame Street with the character Elmo and Telly. In one, Telly was looking for a place called Peekaboo Street and met the real Picabo Street; in the other, Elmo insisted on introducing Picabo because he thought she was a world champion peek-a-boo player. Her name also appeared in the song "One Big Mob" by the rock band Red Hot Chili Peppers.

Street was the runner up (with a time of 5:37) in the NBC celebrity reality competition series Stars Earn Stripes.

== Personal life ==
Street is retired and splits her time between homes in Alabama and Winter Park, Colorado. She has a son born in August 2004, with her former boyfriend N. J. Pawley. On October 25, 2008, she married businessman John Reeser atop Prospect Mountain, near Hanceville, Alabama. On August 3, 2009, Street gave birth to her second son.

On ESPN's College Game Day in Boise on September 25, 2010, Street stated that she was pregnant and expecting her third boy.

Street named her skis for people who were strong and meaningful to her. Among them are her "Earnies" (after Dale Earnhardt) and her "Arnolds" (after Arnold Schwarzenegger).

In the early 2000s, an internet joke spread which claimed Street made a "substantial donation" to her hometown hospital, which named a wing after her, the "Picabo ICU" (as in "Peekaboo! I see you!"). Another version claimed she became an ICU nurse and would answer the phone by saying, "Picabo, ICU!" A less common variant claimed a fan feared Street would be injured and appear in a headline reading, "Picabo? ICU." All three variants of the joke were debunked by Snopes. Car Talk listed her in their list of fake staff credits for the show as the Director of Intensive Care Unit commenting that it therefore was referred to as the "Picabo ICU".

== World Cup results ==
=== Season titles ===
Season	Discipline
1995	Downhill
1996	Downhill

=== Season standings ===
Season	Age	Overall	Slalom	Giant Slalom	Super G	Downhill	Combined
1993	21	39	56	—	39	18	—
1994	22	36	—	—	42	8	16
1995	23	5	—	—	8	1	—
1996	24	6	—	49	14	1	5
1997	25	71	—	—	—	25	—
1998	26	46	—	—	24	17	—
1999	27	no World Cup starts					
2000	28	no World Cup starts					
2001	29	68	—	—	—	26	—
2002	30	52	—	—	—	17	—

=== Race podiums ===
- 9 wins – (9 DH)
- 17 podiums – (15 DH, 2 SG)

Season	Date	Location	Discipline	Place
1993	March 13, 1993	Kvitfjell, Norway	Downhill	2nd
1995	December 9, 1994	Lake Louise, Canada	Downhill	1st
1995	December 11, 1994	Lake Louise, Canada	Super G	3rd
1995	January 14, 1995	Garmisch, Germany	Super G	2nd
1995	January 20, 1995	Cortina d'Ampezzo, Italy	Downhill	2nd
1995	January 21, 1995	Cortina d'Ampezzo, Italy	Downhill	1st
1995	February 17, 1995	Åre, Sweden	Downhill	1st
1995	March 4, 1995	Saalbach, Austria	Downhill	1st
1995	March 11, 1995	Lenzerheide, Switzerland	Downhill	1st
1995	March 15, 1995	Bormio, Italy	Downhill	1st
1996	December 1, 1995	Lake Louise, Canada	Downhill	1st
1996	December 16, 1995	St. Anton, Austria	Downhill	3rd
1996	January 19, 1996	Cortina d'Ampezzo, Italy	Downhill	1st
1996	January 20, 1996	Cortina d'Ampezzo, Italy	Downhill	2nd
1996	February 3, 1996	Val-d'Isère, France	Downhill	2nd
1996	February 29, 1996	Narvik, Norway	Downhill	1st
1996	March 1, 1996	Narvik, Norway	Downhill	2nd

== World Championship results ==
Year	Age	Slalom	Giant Slalom	Super G	Downhill	Combined
1993	21	—	—	—	10	2
1996	24	—	—	3	1	—
1997	25	injured, did not compete				
1999	27	injured, did not compete				

== Olympic results ==
Year	Age	Slalom	Giant Slalom	Super G	Downhill	Combined
1994	22	—	—	—	2	10
1998	26	—	—	1	6	—
2002	30	—	—	—	16	—
