= Živa Klemenčič =

Slovenian biathlete (born 2001)

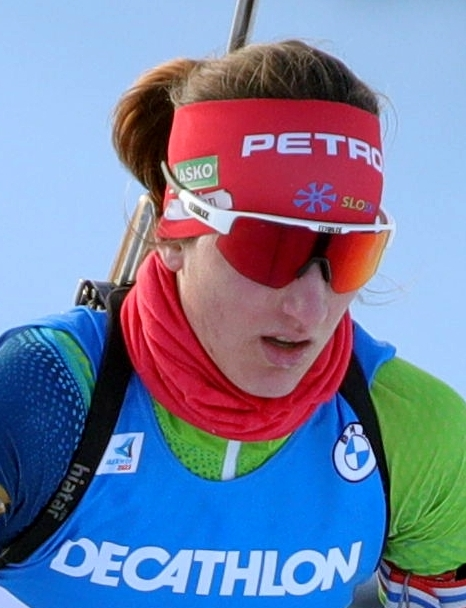

Personal information
- Nationality: Slovenian
- Born: 7 January 2001 (age 25) Kranj, Slovenia

Sport
- Country: Slovenia
- Sport: Biathlon

Živa Klemenčič (born 7 January 2001) is a Slovenian biathlete. She has competed in the Biathlon World Cup since 2021.

== Career ==
Živa Klemenčič has been competing in biathlon since 2016. She made her international debut in the IBU Junior Cup in Pokljuka at the end of January 2017 and also took part in the Junior World Championships in the same year. In January 2019, Klemenčič made her debut in the IBU Cup in Duszniki-Zdrój and finished 41st in the sprint. Slovenian made her debut at the European Championships, and in March 2021 she competed at the World Championships in her home country, finishing 55th in the individual race. Klemenčič also competed for Slovenia at the 2022 Winter Olympics in Beijing where she finished 64th and 79th in the individual and sprint races and 20th in the mixed relay.

== Personal life ==
Her cousin Polona Klemenčič is also a biathlete.

== Biathlon results ==
All results are sourced from the International Biathlon Union.

=== Olympic Games ===
Event	Individual	Sprint	Pursuit	Mass start	Relay	Mixed relay
(China) 2022 Beijing	64th	79th	—	—	—	20th

=== World Championships ===
Event	Individual	Sprint	Pursuit	Mass start	Relay	Mixed relay	Single mixed relay
(Slovenia) 2021 Pokljuka	55th	—	—	—	19th	16th	—
(Germany) 2023 Oberhof	83th	88th	—	—	12th	—	—
(Czech Republic) 2024 Nové Město	—	—	—	—	13th	—	—
(Switzerland) 2025 Lenzerheide	79th	66th	—	—	8th	—	—

*During Olympic seasons competitions are only held for those events not included in the Olympic program.
**The single mixed relay was added as an event in 2019.
