= Urška Hrovat =

Slovenian alpine skier (born 1974)

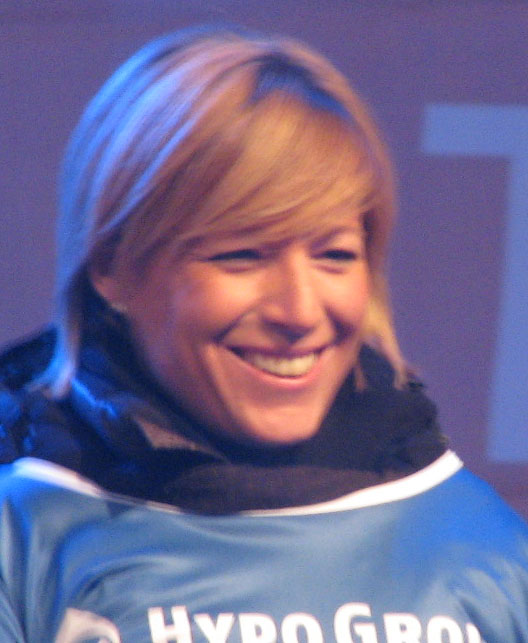

Personal information
- Born: 18 February 1974 (age 52) Ljubljana, SR Slovenia, SFR Yugoslavia

Skiing career
- Sport: Alpine skiing
- Retired: 2 February 2001
- Disciplines: Giant slalom, slalom
- World Cup debut: 14 January 1992

Olympics
- Medals: 0 (0 gold)

World Championships
- Medals: 1 (0 gold)

World Cup
- Seasons: 10
- Wins: 5
- Podiums: 14
- Overall titles: 0
- Discipline titles: 0
Medal record
Women's alpine skiing
Representing Slovenia
World Championships
| Bronze medal – third place | 1996 Sierra Nevada | Slalom |

Urška Hrovat (born 18 February 1974) is a retired Slovenian alpine skier. She competed at three Winter Olympics.

== World Cup results ==
=== Season standings ===
| Season | Age | Overall | Slalom | Giant slalom | Super-G | Downhill | Combined |
|---|---|---|---|---|---|---|---|
| 1992 | 17 | 58 | 21 | — | — | — | — |
| 1993 | 18 | 51 | 14 | — | — | — | — |
| 1994 | 19 | 10 | 3 | 16 | — | — | — |
| 1995 | 20 | 10 | 4 | 8 | — | — | — |
| 1996 | 21 | 14 | 2 | 20 | — | — | — |
| 1997 | 22 | 12 | 8 | 8 | — | — | — |
| 1998 | 23 | 9 | 4 | 16 | — | — | — |
| 1999 | 24 | 30 | 10 | 18 | — | — | — |
| 2000 | 25 | 53 | 16 | 61 | — | — | — |
| 2001 | 26 | 47 | 17 | — | — | — | — |

=== Race podiums ===
- 5 wins (5 SL)
- 14 podiums (13 SL, 1 GS)

| Season | Date | Location | Discipline | Position |
|---|---|---|---|---|
| 1994 | 28 November 1993 | Santa Caterina, Italy | Slalom | 3rd |
| 1994 | 22 January 1994 | Maribor, Slovenia | Slalom | 1st |
| 1994 | 23 January 1994 | Maribor, Slovenia | Slalom | 3rd |
| 1995 | 30 December 1994 | Méribel, France | Slalom | 1st |
| 1995 | 18 March 1995 | Bormio, Italy | Giant slalom | 3rd |
| 1995 | 19 March 1995 | Bormio, Italy | Slalom | 3rd |
| 1996 | 17 December 1995 | St. Anton, Austria | Slalom | 2nd |
| 1996 | 22 December 1995 | Veysonnaz, Switzerland | Slalom | 2nd |
| 1996 | 14 January 1996 | Garmisch-Partenkirchen, Germany | Slalom | 1st |
| 1997 | 4 January 1997 | Maribor, Slovenia | Slalom | 2nd |
| 1998 | 20 December 1997 | Val d'Isere, France | Slalom | 3rd |
| 1998 | 27 December 1997 | Lienz, Austria | Slalom | 3rd |
| 1998 | 14 March 1998 | Crans-Montana, Switzerland | Slalom | 1st |
| 1999 | 21 November 1998 | Park City, United States | Slalom | 1st |

== Olympic Games results ==
| Season | Age | Slalom | Giant slalom | Super-G | Downhill | Combined |
|---|---|---|---|---|---|---|
| 1992 | 17 | 10 | — | DNF | — | — |
| 1994 | 19 | 8 | 20 | 26 | — | 14 |
| 1998 | 23 | DNF2 | 18 | — | — | — |

== World Championships results ==
| Season | Age | Slalom | Giant slalom | Super-G | Downhill | Combined |
|---|---|---|---|---|---|---|
| 1993 | 18 | 26 | 27 | — | — | — |
| 1996 | 21 | 3 | 11 | — | — | — |
| 1997 | 22 | — | — | — | — | — |
| 1999 | 24 | 7 | DNF1 | — | — | — |
| 2001 | 26 | 10 | — | — | — | — |
