= Slovenia at the 2022 Winter Olympics =

- Flag of Slovenia
- IOC code: SLO
- NOC: Olympic Committee of Slovenia
- Website: www.olympic.si

in Beijing, China 4–20 February 2022
- Competitors: 42 (22 men and 20 women) in 6 sports
- Flag bearers (opening): Ilka Štuhec and Rok Marguč
- Flag bearer (closing): Anita Klemenčič
- Medals Ranked 15th: Gold 2 Silver 3 Bronze 2 Total 7

Winter Olympics appearances (overview)
- 1992; 1994; 1998; 2002; 2006; 2010; 2014; 2018; 2022; 2026

Other related appearances
- Yugoslavia (1924–1988)

Slovenia competed at the 2022 Winter Olympics in Beijing, China, from 4 to 20 February 2022.

Alpine skier Ilka Štuhec and snowboarder Žan Košir were initially chosen as the flagbearers at the opening ceremony, however, as Košir tested positive for COVID-19, he was replaced by fellow snowboarder Rok Marguč. Anita Klemenčič was the flagbearer during the closing ceremony.

== Medalists ==
The following Slovenian competitors won medals at the games. In the discipline sections below, the medalists' names are bolded.

Medal	Name	Sport	Event	Date
Gold	Urša Bogataj	Ski jumping	Women's normal hill individual	5 February
Gold	Nika Križnar; Timi Zajc; Urša Bogataj; Peter Prevc	Ski jumping	Mixed team	7 February
Silver	Tim Mastnak	Snowboarding	Men's parallel giant slalom	8 February
Silver	Žan Kranjec	Alpine skiing	Men's giant slalom	13 February
Silver	Lovro Kos; Cene Prevc; Timi Zajc; Peter Prevc	Ski jumping	Men's large hill team	14 February
Bronze	Nika Križnar	Ski jumping	Women's normal hill individual	5 February
Bronze	Gloria Kotnik	Snowboarding	Women's parallel giant slalom	8 February

== Competitors ==
Slovenia was represented by 42 athletes (22 men and 20 women) in six sports.

Sport	Men	Women	Total
Alpine skiing	4	7	11
Biathlon	4	2	6
Cross country skiing	4	5	9
Nordic combined	1	—N/a	1
Ski jumping	5	4	9
Snowboarding	4	2	6
Total	22	20	42

== Alpine skiing ==
Slovenia participated with four male and seven female alpine skiers.

Men

Athlete	Event	Run 1		Run 2		Total	
Athlete	Event	Time	Rank	Time	Rank	Time	Rank
Miha Hrobat	Combined	DNF		did not advance			
Nejc Naraločnik	Combined	DNF		did not advance			
Miha Hrobat	Downhill	—N/a				1:44:71	24
Boštjan Kline	Downhill	—N/a				1:43:75	10
Nejc Naraločnik	Downhill	—N/a				DNF	
**Žan Kranjec**	Giant slalom	1:03.71	8	1:05.83	1	2:09.54	2nd place, silver medalist(s)
Žan Kranjec	Slalom	DNF		did not advance			
Miha Hrobat	Super-G	—N/a				DNF	
Boštjan Kline	Super-G	—N/a				1:22.55	20
Nejc Naraločnik	Super-G	—N/a				1:23.08	24

Women

Athlete	Event	Run 1		Run 2		Total	
Athlete	Event	Time	Rank	Time	Rank	Time	Rank
Maruša Ferk Saioni	Combined	1:33.07	6	57.05	8	2:30.12	9
Maruša Ferk Saioni	Downhill	—N/a				1:34.99	23
Ilka Štuhec	Downhill	—N/a				1:34.88	22
Ana Bucik	Giant slalom	59.42	16	58.47	11	1:57.89	11
Meta Hrovat	Giant slalom	58.48	4	58.56	13	1:57.04	7
Tina Robnik	Giant slalom	1:00.18	21	58.72	15	1:58.90	18
Andreja Slokar	Giant slalom	1:00.08	20	DNF			
Ana Bucik	Slalom	53.73	14	52.94	7	1:46.67	11
Neja Dvornik	Slalom	DNF		did not advance			
Meta Hrovat	Slalom	DNF		did not advance			
Andreja Slokar	Slalom	52.64	4	52.56	5	1:45.20	5
Maruša Ferk Saioni	Super-G	—N/a				1:15.72	23

Mixed

Athlete	Event	Round of 16	Quarterfinal	Semifinal	Final / BM	
Athlete	Event	Opposition Result	Opposition Result	Opposition Result	Opposition Result	Rank
Žan Kranjec; Miha Hrobat; Ana Bucik; Andreja Slokar; Tina Robnik	Team	Canada; **W** 2*–2	Austria; **L** 1–3	did not advance		7

== Biathlon ==
Slovenia sent 2 women and 4 men to the Olympics.

Men

Athlete	Event	Time	Misses	Rank
Miha Dovžan	Individual	53:39.4	2 (0+0+0+2)	38
Jakov Fak	Individual	52:48.0	3 (1+1+0+1)	29
Lovro Planko	Individual	54:27.9	4 (2+1+0+1)	46
Rok Tršan	Individual	55:14.7	1 (1+0+0+0)	54
Jakov Fak	Pursuit	43:58.9	5 (1+2+1+1)	29
Lovro Planko	Pursuit	47:31.6	8 (2+2+2+2)	56
Miha Dovžan	Sprint	26:53.1	2 (2+0)	62
Jakov Fak	Sprint	25:48.0	1 (0+1)	26
Lovro Planko	Sprint	26:22.3	2 (0+2)	42
Rok Tršan	Sprint	27:45.7	1 (0+1)	86
Miha Dovžan; Jakov Fak; Lovro Planko; Rok Tršan	Men's relay	1:24:09.6	10 (0+10)	11

Women

Athlete	Event	Time	Misses	Rank
Polona Klemenčič	Individual	48:18.8	2 (0+2+0+0)	29
Živa Klemenčič	Individual	51:51.6	4 (0+1+0+3)	64
Polona Klemenčič	Pursuit	41:31.5	4 (0+1+2+1)	51
Polona Klemenčič	Sprint	23:31.2	2 (1+1)	59
Živa Klemenčič	Sprint	24:43.6	3 (3+0)	79

Mixed relay

Athlete	Event	Time	Misses	Rank
Miha Dovžan; Jakov Fak; Polona Klemenčič; Živa Klemenčič	Relay	LAP	4+10	20

== Cross-country skiing ==
Slovenia sent 5 women and 4 men to the Olympics.

Distance
Men

Athlete	Event	Classical		Freestyle		Final		
Athlete	Event	Time	Rank	Time	Rank	Time	Deficit	Rank
Vili Črv	15 km classical	—N/a				44:12.9	+6:18.1	69
Miha Ličef	15 km classical	—N/a				42:43.4	+4:48.6	55
Miha Ličef	30 km skiathlon	44:39.3	54	LAP				56
Miha Šimenc	15 km classical	—N/a				44:20.8	+6:26.0	71
Miha Šimenc; Miha Ličef; Vili Črv; Janez Lampič	4 x 10 km relay	—N/a				N/A	LAP	14

Women

Athlete	Event	Classical		Freestyle		Final		
Athlete	Event	Time	Rank	Time	Rank	Time	Deficit	Rank
Anita Klemenčič	10 km classical	—N/a				33:09.3	+5:03.0	62
Anamarija Lampič	10 km classical	—N/a				29:55.0	+1:48.7	17
Anja Mandeljc	10 km classical	—N/a				33:19.5	+5:13.2	66
Neža Žerjav	10 km classical	—N/a				33:56.8	+5:50.5	71
Neža Žerjav	15 km skiathlon	27:07.4	56	24:27.5	47	52:33.1	+8:19.4	55
Anita Klemenčič	30 km freestyle	—N/a				1:46:37.6	+21:43.6	59
Neža Žerjav	30 km freestyle	—N/a				1:42:14.2	+17:20.2	53

Sprint
Men

Athlete	Event	Qualification		Quarterfinal		Semifinal		Final	
Athlete	Event	Time	Rank	Time	Rank	Time	Rank	Time	Rank
Vili Črv	Sprint	2:57.39	42	did not advance					
Janez Lampič	Sprint	3:09.95	74	did not advance					
Miha Ličef	Sprint	3:05.98	65	did not advance					
Miha Šimenc	Sprint	2:58.14	44	did not advance					
Vili Črv; Miha Šimenc	Team sprint	—N/a				20:43.03	8	Did not advance	16

Women

Athlete	Event	Qualification		Quarterfinal		Semifinal		Final	
Athlete	Event	Time	Rank	Time	Rank	Time	Rank	Time	Rank
Anita Klemenčič	Sprint	3:34.12	55	did not advance					
Anamarija Lampič	Sprint	3:22.93	26 **Q**	3:18.60	3 **LL**	3:19.26	6	Did not advance	12
Anja Mandeljc	Sprint	3:35.90	59	did not advance					
Eva Urevc	Sprint	3:30.43	46	did not advance					
Anamarija Lampič; Eva Urevc	Team sprint	—N/a				24:10.14	7	Did not advance	14

== Nordic Combined ==
Slovenia sent 1 athlete to the Olympics.

Athlete	Event	Ski jumping			Cross-country		Total	
Athlete	Event	Distance	Points	Rank	Time	Rank	Time	Rank
Vid Vrhovnik	Normal hill/10 km	91.5	88.0	31	27:34.5	39	30:34.5	37
Vid Vrhovnik	Large hill/10 km	114.0	82.4	34	28:11.8	41	32:01.8	36

== Ski jumping ==
Slovenia sent 4 women and 5 men to the Olympics.

Men

Athlete	Event	Qualification			First round			Final			Total	
Athlete	Event	Distance	Points	Rank	Distance	Points	Rank	Distance	Points	Rank	Points	Rank
Lovro Kos	Large hill	125.0	114.9	19 **Q**	135.0	130.7	13	136.5	137.7	6	268.4	11
Cene Prevc	Large hill	128.5	121.1	10 **Q**	135.0	131.6	10	137.0	136.5	9	268.1	12
Peter Prevc	Large hill	131.0	128.3	3 **Q**	137.0	131.3	12	137.0	137.4	7	268.7	10
Timi Zajc	Large hill	120.0	101.1	33 **Q**	138.5	140.7	3	130.5	132.5	14	273.2	6
Anže Lanišek	Normal hill	94.0	98.5	15 **Q**	99.0	130.6	9	98.0	123.0	17	253.6	13
Lovro Kos	Normal hill	87.0	79.0	35 **Q**	95.0	120.9	28	92.0	108.7	28	229.6	28
Peter Prevc	Normal hill	82.0	77.0	38 **Q**	103.0	139.2	2	99.5	126.2	8	265.4	4
Timi Zajc	Normal hill	88.0	84.3	30 **Q**	97.0	128.2	18	104.5	131.1	4	259.3	9
**Lovro Kos**; **Cene Prevc**; **Peter Prevc**; **Timi Zajc**	Large hill team	—N/a			519.0	467.4	1	505.0	467.0	3	934.4	2nd place, silver medalist(s)

Women

Athlete	Event	First round			Final			Total	
Athlete	Event	Distance	Points	Rank	Distance	Points	Rank	Points	Rank
**Urša Bogataj**	Normal hill	108.0	118.0	2 **Q**	100.0	121.0	1	239.0	1st place, gold medalist(s)
Ema Klinec	Normal hill	100.0	112.1	4 **Q**	90.5	103.3	6	215.4	5
**Nika Križnar**	Normal hill	103.0	113.9	3 **Q**	99.5	118.1	2	232.0	3rd place, bronze medalist(s)
Špela Rogelj	Normal hill	93.0	101.7	9 **Q**	82.0	82.5	18	184.2	9

Mixed Team

Athlete	Event	First round			Final			Total	
Athlete	Event	Distance	Points	Rank	Distance	Points	Rank	Points	Rank
**Urša Bogataj**; **Nika Križnar**; **Peter Prevc**; **Timi Zajc**	Normal hill	406.0	506.4	1	401.0	495.1	1	1001.5	1st place, gold medalist(s)

== Snowboarding ==
Slovenia sent 2 women and 4 men to the Olympics.

Freestyle

Athlete	Event	Qualification					Final				
Athlete	Event	Run 1	Run 2	Run 3	Best	Rank	Run 1	Run 2	Run 3	Total	Rank
Tit Štante	Men's halfpipe	18.25	5.75	—N/a	18.25	22	did not advance				
Urška Pribošič	Women's big air	43.00	~~25.75~~	63.75	106.75	18	did not advance				
Urška Pribošič	Women's slopestyle	27.48	32.00	—N/a	32.00	24	did not advance				

Parallel

Athlete	Event	Qualification		Round of 16	Quarterfinal	Semifinal	Final	
Athlete	Event	Time	Rank	Opposition Time	Opposition Time	Opposition Time	Opposition Time	Rank
Žan Košir	Men's giant slalom	1:22.16	11 **Q**	Fischnaller (ITA); **L** DNF	did not advance			11
Rok Marguč	Men's giant slalom	1:24.38	25	did not advance				25
**Tim Mastnak**	Men's giant slalom	1:21.43	4 **Q**	Angenend (GER); **W**	Kwiatkowski (POL); **W**	Wild (ROC); **W**	Karl (AUT); **L** +0.82	2nd place, silver medalist(s)
**Gloria Kotnik**	Women's giant slalom	1:28.78	14 **Q**	Miki (JPN); **W**	Langenhorst (GER); **W**	Ulbing (AUT); **L** +0.21	Dekker (NED); **W**	3rd place, bronze medalist(s)
