= Marianne Kjørstad =

Norwegian alpine skier (born 1970)

Medal record

Women's alpine skiing

World Championships
Bronze medal – third place	1996 Sierra Nevada	Combined

Marianne Kjørstad (born 27 March 1970) is a retired Norwegian alpine skier.

Competing at the 1987, 1988 and 1989 Junior World Championships, her best result was a fourth place in giant slalom at the 1988 edition. She competed in three events each at the 1993, 1996 and 1997 World Championships. Her career highlight was the bronze medal in the combined at the 1996 World Championships. At the 1994 Winter Olympics she finished 22nd in the super-G and 6th in the giant slalom.

She made her World Cup debut in 1992, and already in 1992–93 she finished steadily among the top 25. The 1993–94 and 1994–95 seasons were particularly strong. After breaking the top 10 in October 1993 in Sölden, she managed two 6th places, two 5th places, two 4th place and one 3rd place, the latter in January 1994 in Maribor. Another 3rd place followed in December 1994 in Vail—before 2nd places in November 1995 in Vail/Beaver Creek and December 1995 in Semmering. Her last World Cup outing came in March 1997 in Mammoth Mountain.

She was born in Nordfjordeid and hails from Haugen.
