= Aleš Brezavšček =

Slovenian alpine skier (born 1972)

Aleš Brezavšček (born 30 November 1972, in Mojstrana) is a Slovenian former alpine skier who competed in the 1998 Winter Olympics.

== Olympic results ==
Year	Age	Slalom	Giant Slalom	Super G	Downhill	Combined
1998	25	—	—	28	DNF	7
