= Tadeja Brankovič-Likozar =

Slovenian biathlete

Tadeja Brankovič
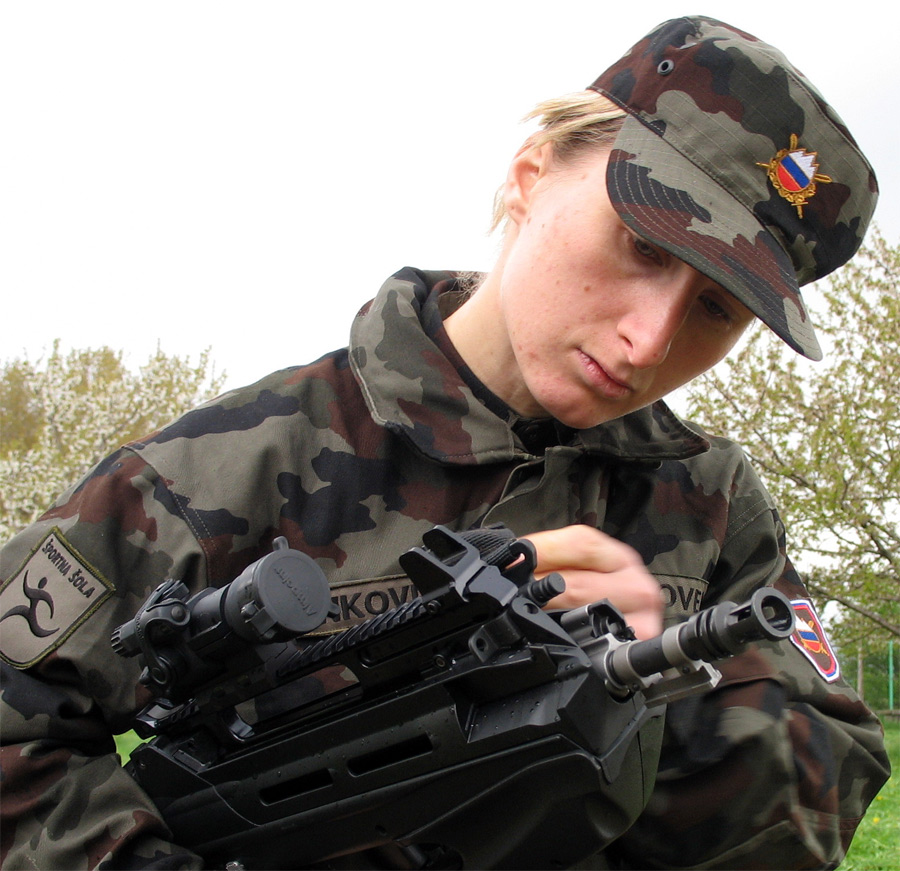

Personal information
- Full name: Tadeja Brankovič
- Born: 20 December 1979 (age 46) Kranj, SFR Yugoslavia
- Height: 1.64 m (5 ft 5 in)
- Website: tadejabrankovic.com

Sport

Professional information
- Club: TŠK Merkur Kranj
- Updated on 19 February 2022

Tadeja Brankovič (born 20 December 1979) is a retired Slovenian biathlete. She joined the Slovenian biathlon team in 1995. To date, she has had five podium finishes (two silver and three bronze medals) in the Biathlon World Cup.

== Career ==
She served as an instructor in the Slovenian military.

Brankovič started for TSK Merkur Kranj.

She debuted in the Biathlon World Cup Brankovič in 1995 in a single (50) in Östersund. In her first season, they achieved few good results and came only three times in the points. In her second season, she came in sixth in Ostersund with a single first among the ten best. Her best finish was a second place in a World Cup sprint – again in Ostersund.

Her first Olympic appearance was in 1998. In the individual races they never came in the top 30. In the relay race, they achieved their best results 2002 and ranked sixth in 2006. She participated in the World Championships beginning in 1996 (in at least one sub-discipline). Her best finish was a 26th in singles at the World Championships in 2001.

Between 2004 and 2007, Brankovič achieved her best results. She married Domen Likozar. In 2007 she paused for two seasons to give birth to her daughter Maša in 2009. She returned for the 2009–10 season, but did not thrive. After the 2010–11 season, Brankovič gave birth to her son and retired. She resides in Cerklje na Gorenjskem.

Olympic Games
Preceded by Dejan Košir	Flagbearer for Slovenia; Turin 2006	Succeeded by Tina Maze
