= Aleksander Grajf =

Slovenian biathlete and cross-country skier

Aleksandar "Sašo" Grajf (born 25 June 1965 in Maribor, SR Slovenia) is a Slovenian biathlete and cross-country skier who competed at five Olympics from 1984 to 2002. He competed for Yugoslavia in cross-country skiing at the 1984 and 1988 Olympics and for Slovenia in biathlon at the 1992, 1998, and 2002 Olympics.

In 2002 he became the second Slovenian to compete at five Olympics, after Rajmond Debevec (who went on to compete at three more Olympics). They have since been joined by biathlete Janez Ožbolt in 2006 and rower Iztok Čop in 2008.
