= Andreja Koblar =

Slovenian biathlete (born 1971)

Andreja Koblar (née Grašič, born 2 September 1971, in Kranj, SFR Yugoslavia) is a former Slovenian biathlete.

== Career ==
Andreja Koblar, who now resides in Križe began her career in biathlon in 1993 and was part of the national team since that season. She made her debut in the Biathlon World Cup in the season opener in Bad Gastein, where she finished 24th at the 20 km individual. A year later, again in Bad Gastein for the first time in her career she came home in the top ten finishing #7 at the sprint. She was most notably consistent in the individual event ever since where she claimed three World Cup victories (1995-96 in Osrblie, 1996/97 in Nozawa Onsen and 1997/98 in Östersund). Overall, she managed a total of nine podiums - seven individual and two sprint ones. In 1996 Koblar was 4th in the World Cup total and placed 6th in 1997–1998 season.

Between 1995 and 2005 Koblar continuously competed on the World Cups level. Her best results were a sixth place at the Sprint 1995 in Antholz, a fourth place at 1999 in Holmenkollen at the mass start and a seventh place at the home World Cup 2001 individual race in Pokljuka. As to Olympics, she was seen in 1994 in Lillehammer, as well as in 1998 in Nagano, and in 2002 in Salt Lake City. In Lillehammer 1994 she finished (44th) at the Individual and was (18)th at the Sprint whilst 1998 Olympics were far more successful for her as she placed (9) at the Individual and (5) at the Sprint and stood at number (6) in the World Cup Total that season.

Since the 35-year-old failed to impress the coaches at the national competition to qualify for the 2006-07 World Cup season, she decided to retire from the sport. On 17 January 2007, at the World Cup in Slovenia she was allowed to start in her farewell race and her fans cheered and welcomed her at the finish line to honor all the great service she had done for her country. She began the race holding Slovenian flag in her hand, which she kept waving as the race progressed but she went off the track right after the first shooting.

== Personal life ==
Koblar is married to alpine skier Jernej Koblar and works as an instructor in the Slovenian Army. They have a son Tinus, who represents Norway in ice hockey. Before the beginning of her biathlon career, she was skiing as a cross-country skier. Her career start was quite difficult since she was the only woman in the national team.
