= Lucija Larisi =

Slovenian biathlete (born 1975)

Personal information
- Nationality: Slovenian
- Born: 5 December 1975 (age 49); Jesenice, SFR Yugoslavia

Sport
- Sport: Biathlon

Lucija Larisi (born 5 December 1975) is a Slovenian biathlete. She competed at the 1998 Winter Olympics in Nagano, and the 2002 Winter Olympics, in Salt Lake City.

She competed in the 7.5km sprint, a 15km run, and 4 x 7.5km relay in the 1998 Winter Olympics, where she placed 59th in the sprint and 35th in the 15km run. Following the relay, Larisi finished the games in 9th place.
