= Nataša Lačen =

Slovenian cross-country skier

Personal information
- Nationality: Slovenia
- Born: 3 December 1971 (age 54) Črna na Koroškem, Yugoslavia

Sport
- Sport: Skiing
- Club: SK Crna

World Cup career
- Seasons: 11 – (1993–2003)
- Indiv. starts: 74
- Indiv. podiums: 0
- Team starts: 6
- Team podiums: 0
- Overall titles: 0 – (41st in 2002)
- Discipline titles: 0

Nataša Lačen (born 3 December 1971 in Črna na Koroškem) is a Slovenian cross country skier who competed from 1993 to 2003. Her best World Cup finish was 12th twice with one each in 2001 and in 2002.

Lačen also competed in two Winter Olympics, earning her best finish of ninth in the 4 × 5 km relay at Salt Lake City in 2002. Her best finish at the FIS Nordic World Ski Championships was 17th in the 30 km event at Val di Fiemme in 2003.

== Cross-country skiing results ==
All results are sourced from the International Ski Federation (FIS).

=== Olympic Games ===
| Year | Age | 5 km | 10 km | 15 km | Pursuit | 30 km | Sprint | 4 × 5 km relay |
|---|---|---|---|---|---|---|---|---|
| 1998 | 26 | 34 | —N/a | 34 | — | 18 | —N/a | — |
| 2002 | 30 | —N/a | 30 | 32 | 23 | — | 32 | 9 |

=== World Championships ===
| Year | Age | 5 km | 10 km | 15 km | Pursuit | 30 km | Sprint | 4 × 5 km relay |
|---|---|---|---|---|---|---|---|---|
| 1993 | 21 | 61 | —N/a | 44 | 57 | 53 | —N/a | — |
| 1995 | 23 | 60 | —N/a | 33 | 48 | 26 | —N/a | — |
| 1997 | 25 | 44 | —N/a | 54 | DNF | — | —N/a | — |
| 1999 | 27 | 44 | —N/a | 42 | DNF | — | —N/a | — |
| 2001 | 29 | —N/a | 35 | 43 | 20 | — | CNX^{[a]} | 11 |
| 2003 | 31 | —N/a | — | — | 17 | 34 | — | — |

a. ^{1} Cancelled due to extremely cold weather.

=== World Cup ===
==== Season standings ====
| Season | Age | | | | |
| Season | Age | Overall | Long Distance | Middle Distance | Sprint |
|---|---|---|---|---|---|
| 1993 | 21 | NC | —N/a | —N/a | —N/a |
| 1994 | 22 | NC | —N/a | —N/a | —N/a |
| 1995 | 23 | 51 | —N/a | —N/a | —N/a |
| 1996 | 24 | 44 | —N/a | —N/a | —N/a |
| 1997 | 25 | NC | NC | —N/a | — |
| 1998 | 26 | 75 | NC | —N/a | 72 |
| 1999 | 27 | 76 | 61 | —N/a | 77 |
| 2000 | 28 | 47 | 32 | 39 | NC |
| 2001 | 29 | 74 | —N/a | —N/a | — |
| 2002 | 30 | 41 | —N/a | —N/a | 43 |
| 2003 | 31 | 99 | —N/a | —N/a | — |
