= Tomaž Žemva =

Slovenian biathlete (born 1973)

Personal information
- Nationality: Slovenian
- Born: 18 August 1973 (age 51); Pokljuka, Yugoslavia

Sport
- Sport: Biathlon

Tomaž Žemva (born 18 August 1973) is a Slovenian biathlete. He competed in the men's 20 km individual event at the 1998 Winter Olympics.
