= Miha Gale =

Slovenian freestyle skier (born 1977)

Personal information
- Nationality: Slovenian
- Born: 29 January 1977 (age 48); Ljubljana, Yugoslavia

Sport
- Sport: Freestyle skiing

Miha Gale (born 29 January 1977) is a Slovenian freestyle skier. He competed at the 1998 Winter Olympics and the 2002 Winter Olympics.
