= Jože Poklukar =

Slovenian biathlete (born 1973)

Personal information
- Nationality: Slovenian
- Born: 30 January 1973 (age 52); Jesenice, Yugoslavia

Sport
- Sport: Biathlon

Jože Poklukar (born 30 January 1973) is a Slovenian biathlete. He competed at the 1994 Winter Olympics and the 1998 Winter Olympics.
