= FIS Alpine World Ski Championships 1996 =

Sporting event in Sierra Nevada, Spain

Coordinates: 37.09°N 3.40°W

- Host city: Sierra Nevada
- Country: Spain
- Events: 10
- Opening: 12 February 1996
- Closing: 25 February 1996
- Opened by: Juan Carlos I

Location in Europe
Location in southern Spain

The FIS Alpine World Ski Championships 1996 were held 12–25 February in Spain at Sierra Nevada near Granada city. The championships were to be held in 1995, but were postponed due to lack of snow.

== Men's competitions ==
=== Downhill ===
Date: February 17

Placing	Country	Athlete	Time
1	(Austria)	Patrick Ortlieb	2:00.17
2	(Italy)	Kristian Ghedina	2:00.44
3	(France)	Luc Alphand	2:00.45

=== Super-G ===
Date: February 13

Placing	Country	Athlete	Time
1	(Norway)	Atle Skårdal	1:21.80
2	(Sweden)	Patrik Järbyn	1:22.09
3	(Norway)	Kjetil André Aamodt	1:22.11

=== Giant Slalom ===
Date: February 23

Placing	Country	Athlete	Time	Run 1	Run 2
1	(Italy)	Alberto Tomba	1:58.63	57.54	1:01.09
2	(Switzerland)	Urs Kälin	1:59.07	58.19	1:00.88
3	(Switzerland)	Michael von Grünigen	1:59.45	58.01	1:01.44

=== Slalom ===
Date: February 25

Placing	Country	Athlete	Time	Run 1	Run 2
1	(Italy)	Alberto Tomba	1:42.26	52.02	50.24
2	(Austria)	Mario Reiter	1:42.57	51.35	51.22
3	(Switzerland)	Michael von Grünigen	1:42.81	51.83	50.98

- YouTube video - leaders' second runs

=== Combination ===
Date: February 19

Placing	Country	Athlete	Time	Slalom	Downhill
1	(Luxembourg)	Marc Girardelli	3:31.95	1:38.99	1:52.96
2	(Norway)	Lasse Kjus	3:32.20	1:40.38	1:51.82
3	(Austria)	Günther Mader	3:32.93	1:40.55	1:52.38

== Women's competitions ==
=== Downhill ===
Date: February 18

Placing	Country	Athlete	Time
1	(United States)	Picabo Street	1:54.06
2	(Germany)	Katja Seizinger	1:54.63
3	(United States)	Hilary Lindh	1:54.70

=== Super-G ===
Date: February 12

Placing	Country	Athlete	Time
1	(Italy)	Isolde Kostner	1:21.00
2	(Switzerland)	Heidi Zurbriggen	1:21.66
3	(United States)	Picabo Street	1:21.71

=== Giant Slalom ===
Date: February 22

Placing	Country	Athlete	Time	Run 1	Run 2
1	(Italy)	Deborah Compagnoni	2:10.74	1:07.09	1:03.65
2	(Switzerland)	Karin Roten	2:11.09	1:06.68	1:04.41
3	(Germany)	Martina Ertl	2:11.44	1:08.77	1:02.67

=== Slalom ===
Date: February 24

Placing	Country	Athlete	Time	Run 1	Run 2
1	(Sweden)	Pernilla Wiberg	1:31.46	44.49	46.97
2	(France)	Patricia Chauvet	1:32.32	45.42	46.90
3	(Slovenia)	Urška Hrovat	1:32.33	44.44	47.89

=== Combination ===
Date: February 19

Placing	Country	Athlete	Time	Downhill	Slalom
1	(Sweden)	Pernilla Wiberg	3:19.68	1:44.00	1:35.68
2	(Austria)	Anita Wachter	3:21.73	1:43.67	1:38.06
3	(Norway)	Marianne Kjørstad	3:22.35	1:45.38	1:36.97

== Medals table ==
Place	Nation	Gold	Silver	Bronze	Total
1	Italy	4	1	-	5
2	Sweden	2	1	-	3
3	Austria	1	2	1	4
4	Norway	1	1	2	4
5	United States	1	-	2	3
6	Luxembourg	1	-	-	1
7	Switzerland	-	3	2	5
8	Germany	-	1	1	2
	France	-	1	1	2
10	Slovenia	-	-	1	1
