= Tomaž Globočnik =

Slovenian biathlete (born 1972)

Personal information
- Nationality: Slovenian
- Born: 17 April 1972 (age 52); Škofja Loka, Yugoslavia

Sport
- Sport: Biathlon

Tomaž Globočnik (born 17 April 1972) is a Slovenian biathlete. He competed at the 1998 Winter Olympics and the 2002 Winter Olympics.
