= Špela Bračun =

Slovenian alpine skier (born 1977)

Špela Bračun (born 3 August 1977 in Škofja Loka) is a Slovenian former alpine skier who competed in the 1998 Winter Olympics and 2002 Winter Olympics.

== World Cup results ==
=== Season standings ===
Season	Age	Overall	Slalom	Giant slalom	Super-G	Downhill	Combined
1996	18	103	—	—	41	—	—
1997	19	67	—	—	28	38	—
1998	20	48	—	—	22	24	18
1999	21	55	—	54	38	26	13
2000	22	38	—	50	19	16	—
2001	23	73	—	—	37	33	—
2002	24	97	—	—	—	37	—
2003	25	115	—	—	—	45	—

=== Race podiums ===
Season	Date	Location	Discipline	Position
2000	17 December 1999	St. Moritz, Switzerland	Downhill	3rd
