= Janez Ožbolt =

Slovenian biathlete (born 1970)

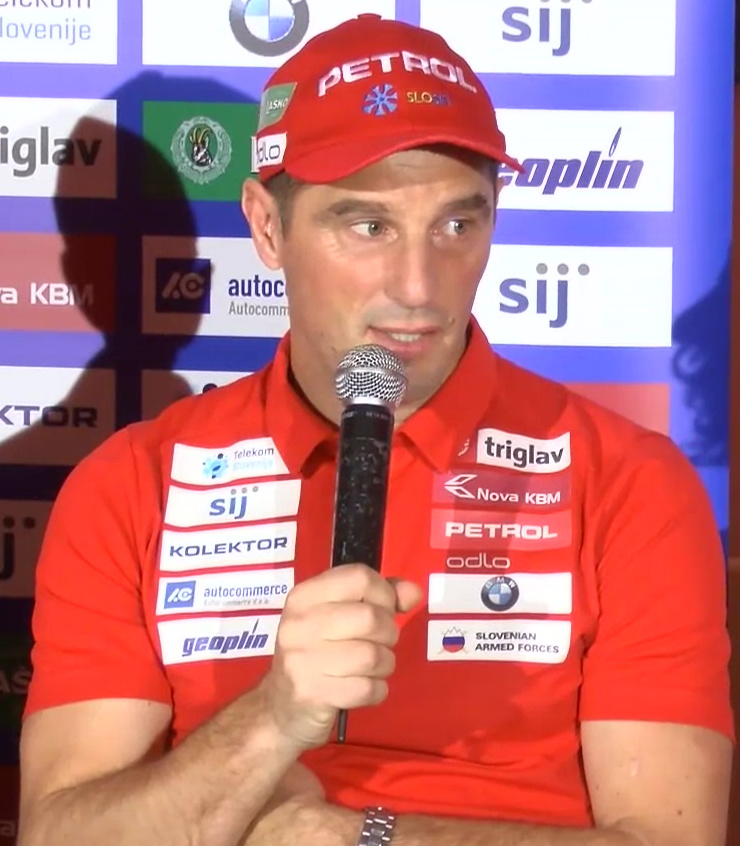
- Janez Ožbolt in 2016

Personal information
- Nationality: Slovenian
- Born: 22 August 1970 (age 54); Stari Trg pri Ložu, Yugoslavia

Sport
- Sport: Biathlon

Janez Ožbolt (born 22 August 1970) is a Slovenian biathlete. He competed at five consecutive Winter Olympics, from 1992 to 2006.

== See also ==
- List of athletes with the most appearances at Olympic Games
