= Czech Republic at the 2006 Winter Olympics =

- IOC code: CZE
- NOC: Czech Olympic Committee
- Website: www.olympic.cz (in Czech and English)

in Turin
- Competitors: 84 (64 men, 20 women) in 13 sports
- Flag bearers: Martina Sáblíková (opening); Kateřina Neumannová (closing)
- Medals Ranked 15th: Gold 1 Silver 2 Bronze 1 Total 4

Winter Olympics appearances (overview)
- 1994; 1998; 2002; 2006; 2010; 2014; 2018; 2022; 2026

Other related appearances
- Czechoslovakia (1924–1992)

The Czech Republic competed at the 2006 Winter Olympics in Turin, Italy. Speed skater Martina Sáblíková served as flag bearer at the opening ceremonies. The medal hopes were set on ice hockey team, Jakub Janda in ski jumping, Kateřina Neumannová in cross-country skiing and on Sáblíková. As for hockey team, the bronze medal was less than most of Czech fans awaited before the olympic, and more than they hoped for after the group stage. But the strongest moment for Czech sport fans was unbelievable finish of Kateřina Neumannová in cross-country skiing, where she on the last meters of 30 km run got from the third to first position. It was her last Olympic start and it was finally a gold one, and the view of her little daughter running to her as the first to congratulate will be a lasting moment of Turin 2006.

== Medalists ==
Medal	Name	Sport	Event	Date
Gold	Kateřina Neumannová	Cross-country skiing	Women's 30 km freestyle	24 February
Silver	Kateřina Neumannová	Cross-country skiing	Women's 15 km pursuit	12 February
Silver	Lukáš Bauer	Cross-country skiing	Men's 15 km classical	17 February
Bronze	Czech Republic national men's ice hockey team: Dominik Hašek; Tomáš Vokoun; Milan Hnilička; Dušan Salfický; František Kaberle; Tomáš Kaberle; Filip Kuba; Pavel Kubina; Marek Malík; Jaroslav Špaček; Marek Židlický; Jan Bulis; Petr Čajánek; Patrik Eliáš; Martin Erat; Milan Hejduk; Aleš Hemský; Jaromír Jágr; Robert Lang; Rostislav Olesz; Václav Prospal; Martin Ručinský; Martin Straka; David Výborný	Ice hockey	Men's tournament	25 February

== Alpine skiing ==
Men

Athlete	Event	Final				
Athlete	Event	Run 1	Run 2	Run 3	Total	Rank
Ondřej Bank	Downhill	did not finish				
Ondřej Bank	Super-G	did not finish				
Ondřej Bank	Giant slalom	1:18.45	1:19.40	n/a	2:37.85	16
Ondřej Bank	Slalom	did not start				
Ondřej Bank	Combined	1:40.50	45.34	45.16	3:11.00	6
Kryštof Krýzl	Super-G	n/a			1:34.20	34
Kryštof Krýzl	Giant slalom	did not finish				
Kryštof Krýzl	Slalom	did not finish				
Kryštof Krýzl	Combined	1:41.47	46.62	46.09	3:14.18	20
Filip Trejbal	Slalom	54.75	did not finish			
Filip Trejbal	Combined	did not finish				
Martin Vráblík	Super-G	n/a			1:34.90	38
Martin Vráblík	Giant slalom	1:20.41	did not finish			
Martin Vráblík	Slalom	56.01	51.39	n/a	1:47.40	21
Martin Vráblík	Combined	1:40.50	46.73	45.18	3:12.41	12
Petr Záhrobský	Downhill	n/a			1:52.90	34
Petr Záhrobský	Super-G	n/a			1:33.70	32
Petr Záhrobský	Giant slalom	did not finish				
Borek Zakouřil	Downhill	n/a			1:54.07	36

Women

Athlete	Event	Final				
Athlete	Event	Run 1	Run 2	Run 3	Total	Rank
Lucie Hrstková	Super-G	1:35.62	n/a			36
Lucie Hrstková	Giant slalom	1:03.21	did not finish			
Lucie Hrstková	Slalom	46.45	did not finish			
Lucie Hrstková	Combined	40.96	46.19	1:32.42	2:59.57	22
Eva Kurfürstová	Slalom	45.03	48.44	n/a	1:33.47	28
Šárka Záhrobská	Super-G	1:34.98	n/a			27
Šárka Záhrobská	Giant slalom	1:03.61	did not finish			
Šárka Záhrobská	Slalom	43.52	48.03	n/a	1:31.55	13
Šárka Záhrobská	Combined	40.26	44.50	1:32.38	2:57.14	19
Petra Zakouřilová	Giant slalom	1:03.93	1:13.07	n/a	2:27.00	27
Petra Zakouřilová	Slalom	did not finish				
Petra Zakouřilová	Combined	40.46	45.72	1:34.59	3:00.77	24

Note: In the men's combined, run 1 is the downhill, and runs 2 and 3 are the slalom. In the women's combined, run 1 and 2 are the slalom, and run 3 the downhill.

== Biathlon ==
Men

Athlete	Event	Final		
Athlete	Event	Time	Misses	Rank
Roman Dostál	Sprint	28:05.6	3	42
Roman Dostál	Pursuit	38:48.07	7	29
Roman Dostál	Mass start	49:29.9	4	23
Roman Dostál	Individual	58:53.5	4	30
Tomáš Holubec	Individual	59:13.1	2	33
Ondřej Moravec	Sprint	28:20.3	1	32
Ondřej Moravec	Pursuit	39:52.35	5	39
Michal Šlesingr	Sprint	29:22.9	3	55
Michal Šlesingr	Pursuit	39:03.78	4	32
Michal Šlesingr	Individual	1:00:03.8	5	45
Zdeněk Vítek	Sprint	27:24.1	1	10
Zdeněk Vítek	Pursuit	37:30.22	5	16
Zdeněk Vítek	Mass start	49:21.3	2	22
Zdeněk Vítek	Individual	57:26.8	3	22
Ondřej Moravec; Zdeněk Vítek; Roman Dostál; Michal Šlesingr	Relay	1:23:04.0	12	6

Women

Athlete	Event	Final		
Athlete	Event	Time	Misses	Rank
Irena Česneková	Individual	1:00:08.0	7	67
Lenka Faltusová	Sprint	24:16.9	0	32
Lenka Faltusová	Pursuit	43:22.57	4	36
Kateřina Holubcová	Sprint	24:33.3	1	39
Kateřina Holubcová	Pursuit	41:37.52	3	24
Kateřina Holubcová	Individual	56:17.9	4	45
Magda Rezlerová	Sprint	26:06.7	2	61
Magda Rezlerová	Individual	59:18.0	6	61
Zdeňka Vejnarová	Sprint	24:46.4	2	43
Zdeňka Vejnarová	Pursuit	43:17.79	6	35
Zdeňka Vejnarová	Individual	57:14.3	6	53
Kateřina Holubcová; Lenka Faltusová; Magda Rezlerová; Zdeňka Vejnarová	Relay	1:24:14.8	13	13

== Bobsleigh ==
Athlete	Event	Final					
Athlete	Event	Run 1	Run 2	Run 3	Run 4	Total	Rank
Ivo Danilevič; Roman Gomola	Two-man	56.40	56.24	56.99	57.12	3:46.75	16
Miloš Veselý; Jan Kobián	Two-man	56.93	57.49	58.28	did not advance		28
Ivo Danilevič; Radek Řechka; Roman Gomola; Jan Kobián	Four-man	55.92	55.83	55.66	55.56	3:42.97	14

== Cross-country skiing ==
Distance

Men

Athlete	Event	Final	
Athlete	Event	Total	Rank
Lukáš Bauer	15 km classical	38:15.8	Silver medal
Lukáš Bauer	30 km pursuit	1:17:10.1	10
Lukáš Bauer	50 km freestyle	2:06:29.0	16
Martin Koukal	30 km pursuit	1:18:09.6	21
Martin Koukal	50 km freestyle	2:06:14.9	7
Jiří Magál	30 km pursuit	1:17:21.7	14
Jiří Magál	50 km freestyle	2:06:15.1	8
Petr Michl	15 km classical	42:54.0	58
Milan Šperl	30 km pursuit	1:20:16.7	35
Milan Šperl	50 km freestyle	2:07:01.9	27
Martin Koukal; Lukáš Bauer; Jiří Magál; Dušan Kožíšek	4 x 10 km relay	1:46:03.3	9

Women

Athlete	Event	Final	
Athlete	Event	Total	Rank
Helena Erbenová	15 km pursuit	45:57.0	29
Helena Erbenová	30 km freestyle	1:30:20.6	39
Ivana Janečková	15 km pursuit	45:33.5	23
Ivana Janečková	30 km freestyle	1:27:55.7	27
Kateřina Neumannová	10 km classical	28:22.2	5
Kateřina Neumannová	15 km pursuit	42.50.6	Silver medal
Kateřina Neumannová	30 km freestyle	1:22:25.4	Gold medal
Eva Nývltová	10 km classical	31:25.8	45
Kamila Rajdlová	10 km classical	30:25.2	32
Kamila Rajdlová	30 km freestyle	1:28:38.6	31
Helena Erbenová; Kamila Rajdlová; Ivana Janečková; Kateřina Neumannová	4 x 5 km relay	55:46.3	6

Sprint

Athlete	Event	Qualifying		Quarterfinal		Semifinal		Final	
Athlete	Event	Total	Rank	Total	Rank	Total	Rank	Total	Rank
Martin Koukal	Men's sprint	2:19.39	20 Q	2:23.5	3	Did not advance			15
Dušan Kožíšek	Men's sprint	2:19.64	21 Q	2:24.5	5	Did not advance			22
Eva Nývltová	Women's sprint	2:22.86	50	Did not advance					50
Martin Koukal; Dušan Kožíšek	Men's team sprint	n/a				17:34.9	2 Q	17:49.6	10
Helena Erbenová; Kamila Rajdlová	Women's team sprint	n/a				18:11.6	6	Did not advance	12

== Figure skating ==
Athlete	Event	CD		SP/OD		FS/FD		Total	
Athlete	Event	Points	Rank	Points	Rank	Points	Rank	Points	Rank
Tomáš Verner	Men's	n/a		59.71	22 Q	120.36	15	180.07	18

Key: CD = Compulsory Dance, FD = Free Dance, FS = Free Skate, OD = Original Dance, SP = Short Program

== Freestyle skiing ==
Athlete	Event	Qualifying		Final	
Athlete	Event	Points	Rank	Points	Rank
Nikola Sudová	Women's moguls	23.31	11	23.58	6
Šárka Sudová	Women's moguls	18.64	26	did not advance	26
Aleš Valenta	Men's aerials	193.58	21	did not advance	21

== Ice hockey ==
=== Men's tournament ===
Players

The following is the Czech roster for the men's ice hockey tournament at the 2006 Winter Olympics.

Head coach: Alois Hadamczik

Assistant coaches: Mojmír Trličík, Ondrej Weissmann

No.	Pos.	Name	Height	Weight	Birthdate	Team
3	D	Marek Židlický	5 ft 10 in (178 cm)	190 lb (86 kg)	February 3, 1977 (aged 29)	(United States) Nashville Predators
6	D	Jaroslav Špaček	5 ft 11 in (180 cm)	203 lb (92 kg)	February 11, 1974 (aged 32)	(Canada) Edmonton Oilers
8	D	Marek Malík	6 ft 4 in (193 cm)	236 lb (107 kg)	June 25, 1975 (aged 30)	(United States) New York Rangers
9	F	David Výborný (A)	5 ft 10 in (178 cm)	183 lb (83 kg)	January 25, 1975 (aged 31)	(United States) Columbus Blue Jackets
12	D	František Kaberle	6 ft 1 in (185 cm)	190 lb (86 kg)	November 8, 1973 (aged 32)	(United States) Carolina Hurricanes
13	D	Pavel Kubina (A)	6 ft 4 in (193 cm)	243 lb (110 kg)	April 15, 1977 (aged 28)	(United States) Tampa Bay Lightning
15	D	Tomáš Kaberle	6 ft 1 in (185 cm)	212 lb (96 kg)	March 2, 1978 (aged 27)	(Canada) Toronto Maple Leafs
16	F	Petr Čajánek	5 ft 11 in (180 cm)	185 lb (84 kg)	August 18, 1975 (aged 30)	(United States) St. Louis Blues
17	D	Filip Kuba	6 ft 4 in (193 cm)	229 lb (104 kg)	December 29, 1976 (aged 29)	(United States) Minnesota Wild
20	F	Robert Lang (C)	6 ft 3 in (191 cm)	212 lb (96 kg)	December 19, 1970 (aged 35)	(United States) Detroit Red Wings
22	F	Aleš Kotalík	6 ft 1 in (185 cm)	227 lb (103 kg)	December 23, 1978 (aged 27)	(United States) Buffalo Sabres
23	F	Milan Hejduk	6 ft 0 in (183 cm)	192 lb (87 kg)	February 14, 1976 (aged 30)	(United States) Colorado Avalanche
26	F	Martin Ručinský	6 ft 2 in (188 cm)	209 lb (95 kg)	March 11, 1971 (aged 34)	(United States) New York Rangers
28	F	Martin Straka	5 ft 9 in (175 cm)	174 lb (79 kg)	September 3, 1972 (aged 33)	(United States) New York Rangers
29	G	Tomáš Vokoun	6 ft 0 in (183 cm)	216 lb (98 kg)	July 2, 1976 (aged 29)	(United States) Nashville Predators
33	G	Milan Hnilička	6 ft 1 in (185 cm)	185 lb (84 kg)	June 25, 1973 (aged 32)	(Czech Republic) Bílí Tygři Liberec
38	F	Jan Bulis	6 ft 0 in (183 cm)	209 lb (95 kg)	March 13, 1978 (aged 27)	(Canada) Montreal Canadiens
39	G	Dominik Hašek	6 ft 0 in (183 cm)	165 lb (75 kg)	January 29, 1965 (aged 41)	(Canada) Ottawa Senators
40	F	Václav Prospal	6 ft 2 in (188 cm)	198 lb (90 kg)	February 17, 1975 (aged 30)	(United States) Tampa Bay Lightning
62	F	Patrik Eliáš	6 ft 1 in (185 cm)	190 lb (86 kg)	April 13, 1976 (aged 29)	(United States) New Jersey Devils
68	F	Jaromír Jágr	6 ft 3 in (191 cm)	230 lb (100 kg)	February 15, 1972 (aged 34)	(United States) New York Rangers
72	G	Dušan Salfický	6 ft 1 in (185 cm)	185 lb (84 kg)	March 28, 1972 (aged 33)	(Russia) Khimik Mytischi
83	F	Aleš Hemský	6 ft 0 in (183 cm)	176 lb (80 kg)	August 13, 1983 (aged 22)	(Canada) Edmonton Oilers
85	F	Rostislav Olesz	6 ft 1 in (185 cm)	214 lb (97 kg)	October 10, 1985 (aged 20)	(United States) Florida Panthers
91	F	Martin Erat	5 ft 10 in (178 cm)	198 lb (90 kg)	August 29, 1981 (aged 24)	(United States) Nashville Predators

Round-robin

Pos	Team	Pld	W	D	L	GF	GA	GD	Pts	Qualification
1	Finland	5	5	0	0	19	2	+17	10	Quarterfinals
2	Switzerland	5	2	2	1	10	12	−2	6	Quarterfinals
3	Canada	5	3	0	2	15	9	+6	6	Quarterfinals
4	Czech Republic	5	2	0	3	14	12	+2	4	Quarterfinals
5	Germany	5	0	2	3	7	16	−9	2	
6	Italy (H)	5	0	2	3	9	23	−14	2	

Source: IIHF
(H) Hosts

15 February 2006; 17:05	Germany	1–4 (1–0, 0–2, 0–2)	Czech Republic	Palasport Olimpico, Turin; Attendance: 6,463

Game reference

Olaf Kölzig
Goalies
Dominik Hašek (out 9:25)
Tomáš Vokoun (in 9:25)
Referee:
(Canada) Dan Marouelli
Linesmen:
(United States) Kevin Redding
(United States) Tony Sericolo

T. Boos (A. Sulzer) (PP) – 19:10	1–0
	1–1	21:02 – T. Kaberle (P. Kubina, T. Vokoun) (PP)
	1–2	23:38 – T. Kaberle (M. Straka, J. Jágr) (PP)
	1–3	57:47 – J. Jágr
	1–4	59:32 – D. Výborný (EN)

10 min
Penalties
12 min
25
Shots
34

16 February 2006; 13:05	Czech Republic	2–3 (0–1, 1–1, 1–1)	Switzerland	Torino Esposizioni, Turin; Attendance: 3,400

Game reference

Tomáš Vokoun
Goalies
David Aebischer
Referee:
(United States) Dennis LaRue
Linesmen:
(United States) Tony Sericolo
(Russia) Sergei Shelyanin

	0–1	5:11 – T. Ziegler (I. Rüthemann)
J. Jágr (M. Straka, V. Prospal) – 22:55	1–1
	1–2	29:44 – T. Paterlini (SH)
M. Židlický (A. Hemský, M. Ručinský) – 41:00	2–2
	2–3	46:42 – M. Streit (M. Seger, M. Plüss) (PP)

14 min
Penalties
20 min
42
Shots
19

18 February 2006; 21:05	Czech Republic	2–4 (1–1, 1–1, 0–2)	Finland	Palasport Olimpico, Turin; Attendance: 8,705

Game reference

Tomáš Vokoun
Goalies
Antero Niittymäki
Referee:
(Sweden) Thomas Andersson
Linesmen:
(United States) Tony Sericolo
(Russia) Sergei Shelyanin

M. Židlický (R. Lang, M. Hejduk) (PP) – 8:25	1–0
	1–1	14:14 – O. Jokinen (S. Koivu, V. Peltonen)
	1–2	35:02 – J. Lehtinen (K. Timonen) (PP)
M. Židlický (R. Lang, J. Špaček) (PP2) – 38:17	2–2
	2–3	40:30 – T. Selänne (J. Lehtinen, S. Koivu)
	2–4	48:33 – J. Lehtinen (S. Koivu, T. Selänne)

12 min
Penalties
39 min
39
Shots
32

19 February 2006; 20:05	Czech Republic	4–1 (2–0, 1–0, 1–1)	Italy	Palasport Olimpico, Turin; Attendance: 8,776

Game reference

Tomáš Vokoun
Goalies
Günther Hell (out 27:32)
Jason Muzzatti (in 27:32)
Referee:
(Russia) Vyacheslav Bulanov
Linesmen:
(Slovakia) Miroslav Halecký
(Sweden) Joacim Karlsson

M. Hejduk (D. Výborný, T. Kaberle) – 12:57	1–0
V. Prospal (J. Jágr, M. Straka) – 14:20	2–0
V. Prospal (M. Straka) (SH) – 28:36	3–0
	3–1	57:53 – J. Parco (G. de Bettin, T. Iob)
V. Prospal (M. Straka, T. Vokoun) (EN) – 58:40	4–1

20 min
Penalties
58 min
43
Shots
16

21 February 2006; 16:35	Canada	3–2 (3–0, 0–1, 0–1)	Czech Republic	Palasport Olimpico, Turin; Attendance: 9,126

Game reference

Martin Brodeur
Goalies
Tomáš Vokoun (out 20:00)
Milan Hnilička (in 20:00)
Referee:
(Canada) Dan Marouelli
Linesmen:
(Sweden) Joacim Karlsson
(United States) Thor Nelson

B. Richards (J. Iginla, C. Pronger) – 7:37	1–0
M. St. Louis (V. Lecavalier, R. Blake) (PP) – 11:19	2–0
C. Pronger (J. Thornton) – 19:24	3–0
	3–1	33:46 – P. Kubina (J. Jágr, M. Ručinský) (PP)
	3–2	42:41 – P. Čajánek (T. Kaberle, A. Hemský)

8 min
Penalties
4 min
16
Shots
33

Medal round

Quarterfinal

22 February 2006; 21:35	Slovakia	1–3 (0–1, 0–1, 1–1)	Czech Republic	Palasport Olimpico, Turin; Attendance: 6,893

Game reference

Peter Budaj
Goalies
Milan Hnilička
Referee:
(Canada) Don Van Massenhoven
Linesmen:
(Finland) Stefan Fonselius
(Canada) Pierre Racicot

	0–1	12:51 – M. Ručinský (SH)
	0–2	28:41 – M. Hejduk (F. Kaberle, M. Ručinský)
M. Gáborík (Mari. Hossa) – 43:38	1–2
	1–3	59:57 − M. Straka (EN)

8 min
Penalties
14 min
21
Shots
28

Semifinal

24 February 2006; 16:35	Sweden	7–3 (2–1, 4–2, 1–0)	Czech Republic	Palasport Olimpico, Turin; Attendance: 8,071

Game reference

Henrik Lundqvist
Goalies
Milan Hnilička (out 27:54)
Tomáš Vokoun (in 27:54)
Referee:
(Canada) Dan Marouelli
Linesmen:
(Finland) Antti Hämäläinen
(Canada) Pierre Racicot

F. Modin (M. Sundin, P. Forsberg) – 0:34	1–0
	1–1	3:11 – F. Kuba (M. Straka, V. Prospal)
P. Axelsson (N. Lidström, N. Kronwall) – 13:37	2–1
H. Sedin (D. Sedin) – 21:16	3–1
C. Bäckman (D. Alfredsson) – 23:54	4–1
J. Jönsson (K. Jönsson, M. Samuelsson) (PP) – 27:54	5–1
	5–2	30:40 – A. Hemský (J. Jágr, M. Židlický) (PP)
	5–3	31:25 – V. Prospal (D. Výborný)
D. Alfredsson (P. Axelsson) – 39:00	6–3
T. Holmström (H. Zetterberg) – 56:05	7–3

8 min
Penalties
6 min
32
Shots
24

Bronze medal game

25 February 2006; 20:35	Russia	0–3 (0–1, 0–1, 0–1)	Czech Republic	Palasport Olimpico, Turin; Attendance: 8,379

Game reference

Evgeni Nabokov
Goalies
Tomáš Vokoun
Referee:
(Sweden) Thomas Andersson
Linesmen:
(Sweden) Joacim Karlsson
(Canada) Steve Miller

0–1	4:48 – M. Erat (D. Výborný, R. Lang)
0–2	26:36 – M. Židlický (J. Jágr, R. Lang) (PP)
0–3	59:52 – M. Straka (M. Erat) (EN)

41 min
Penalties
14 min
28
Shots
15

== Luge ==
Athlete	Event	Final					
Athlete	Event	Run 1	Run 2	Run 3	Run 4	Total	Rank
Jakub Hyman	Men's singles	53.262	53.667	52.964	52.930	3:32.823	27
Markéta Jeriová	Women's singles	did not finish					
Lukáš Brož; Antonín Brož	Doubles	49.415	48.697	n/a		1:38.112	16

== Nordic combined ==
Athlete	Event	Ski jumping		Cross-country		
Athlete	Event	Points	Rank	Deficit	Time	Rank
Patrik Chlum	Individual Gundersen	182.5	45	5:20	50:03.9 +10:19.3	47
Pavel Churavý	Sprint	96.1	36	1:58	20:09.9 +1:40.9	31
Pavel Churavý	Individual Gundersen	210.0	31	3:30	43:14.2 +3:29.6	21
Ladislav Rygl	Sprint	104.7	26	1:24	18:11.2 +1:06.2	17
Ladislav Rygl	Individual Gundersen	198.0	34	4:18	44:58.7 +5:14.1	36
Tomáš Slavík	Sprint	104.9	25	1:23	20:03.8 +1:34.8	26
Tomáš Slavík	Individual Gundersen	196.5	35	4:24	44:59.4 +5:14.8	37
Aleš Vodseďálek	Sprint	97.2	35	1:54	22:45.0 +4:16.0	47
Aleš Vodseďálek; Tomáš Slavík; Ladislav Rygl; Pavel Churavý	Team	805.1	9	1:48	53:58.5 +4:05.9	8

Note: 'Deficit' refers to the amount of time behind the leader a competitor began the cross-country portion of the event. Italicized numbers show the final deficit from the winner's finishing time.

== Short track speed skating ==
Athlete	Event	Heat		Quarterfinal		Semifinal		Final	
Athlete	Event	Time	Rank	Time	Rank	Time	Rank	Time	Rank
Kateřina Novotná	Women's 500 m	46.279	2 Q	45.596	1 Q	45.718	4	Final B 55.378	6
Kateřina Novotná	Women's 1000 m	1:32.220	3	did not advance					13
Kateřina Novotná	Women's 1500 m	2:31.367	3 Q	n/a		2:27.395	5	did not advance	13

== Ski jumping ==
Athlete	Event	Qualifying		First round		Final		
Athlete	Event	Points	Rank	Points	Rank	Points	Total	Rank
Jakub Janda	Normal hill	121.5	9 PQ	123.5	18 Q	125.5	249.0	13
Jakub Janda	Large hill	112.7	12 PQ	108.6	13 Q	121.9	230.5	10
Jan Matura	Normal hill	115.5	20 Q	120.0	21 Q	111.0	231.0	21
Jan Matura	Large hill	79.5	30 Q	96.7	29 Q	107.7	204.4	22
Jan Mazoch	Normal hill	106.0	33 Q	108.5	36	did not advance		36
Borek Sedlák	Normal hill	120.0	12 Q	107.0	38	did not advance		38
Borek Sedlák	Large hill	86.8	20 Q	83.0	40	did not advance		40
Ondřej Vaculík	Large hill	76.0	31 Q	70.1	45	did not advance		45
Jan Matura; Ondřej Vaculík; Borek Sedlák; Jakub Janda	Team	n/a		397.0	9	did not advance		9

Note: PQ indicates a skier was pre-qualified for the final, based on entry rankings.

== Snowboarding ==
Halfpipe

Athlete	Event	Qualifying run 1		Qualifying run 2		Final		
Athlete	Event	Points	Rank	Points	Rank	Run 1	Run 2	Rank
Martin Černík	Men's halfpipe	18.3	31	20.1	27	did not advance		33

Note: In the final, the single best score from two runs is used to determine the ranking. A bracketed score indicates a run that wasn't counted.

Parallel GS

Athlete	Event	Qualification		Round of 16	Quarterfinals	Semifinals	Finals	
Athlete	Event	Time	Rank	Opposition Time	Opposition Time	Opposition Time	Opposition Time	Rank
Petra Elsterová	Women's parallel giant slalom	1:24.81	23	did not advance				23

Key: '+ Time' represents a deficit; the brackets indicate the results of each run.

Snowboard Cross

Athlete	Event	Qualifying		1/8 finals	Quarterfinals	Semifinals	Finals	
Athlete	Event	Time	Rank	Position	Position	Position	Position	Rank
Michal Novotný	Men's snowboard cross	1:22.92	28 Q	2 Q	4	did not advance	Classification 13-16; 1	13

== Speed skating ==
Athlete	Event	Race 1		Final	
Athlete	Event	Time	Rank	Time	Rank
Martina Sáblíková	Women's 3000 m	n/a		4:08.42	7
Martina Sáblíková	Women's 5000 m	n/a		7:01.38	4
