= Alpine skiing at the 2002 Winter Olympics – Women's giant slalom =

Women's giant slalom at the XIX Olympic Winter Games
- Pictogram for alpine skiing
- Venue: Park City
- Date: February 22, 2002
- Competitors: 69 from 35 nations
- Winning time: 2:30.01

Medalists
1st place, gold medalist(s)		Janica Kostelić	Croatia
2nd place, silver medalist(s)		Anja Pärson	Sweden
3rd place, bronze medalist(s)		Sonja Nef	Switzerland

The event was held on February 22, 2002 at Park City Mountain Resort.

== Results ==
Complete results from the women's giant slalom event at the 2002 Winter Olympics.

Rank	Name	Country	Run 1	Run 2	Time	Difference
1st place, gold medalist(s)	Janica Kostelić	Croatia	1:16.00	1:14.01	2:30.01	
2nd place, silver medalist(s)	Anja Pärson	Sweden	1:16.87	1:14.46	2:31.33	+1.32
3rd place, bronze medalist(s)	Sonja Nef	Switzerland	1:16.94	1:14.73	2:31.67	+1.66
4	Alexandra Meissnitzer	Austria	1:16.49	1:15.46	2:31.95	+1.94
4	Michaela Dorfmeister	Austria	1:16.89	1:15.06	2:31.95	+1.94
6	María José Rienda	Spain	1:16.73	1:15.80	2:32.53	+2.52
7	Ylva Nowén	Sweden	1:17.09	1:15.69	2:32.78	+2.77
7	Allison Forsyth	Canada	1:17.36	1:15.42	2:32.78	+2.77
9	Anna Ottosson	Sweden	1:17.12	1:15.81	2:32.93	+2.92
10	Karen Putzer	Italy	1:17.43	1:15.51	2:32.94	+2.93
11	Tanja Poutiainen	Finland	1:17.31	1:15.66	2:32.97	+2.96
12	Tina Maze	Slovenia	1:17.16	1:16.20	2:33.36	+3.35
13	Corinne Rey-Bellet	Switzerland	1:17.92	1:15.51	2:33.43	+3.42
14	Denise Karbon	Italy	1:17.75	1:15.81	2:33.56	+3.55
15	Brigitte Obermoser	Austria	1:17.82	1:15.86	2:33.68	+3.67
16	Silke Bachmann	Italy	1:17.92	1:16.02	2:33.94	+3.93
17	Kristina Koznick	United States	1:18.04	1:16.18	2:34.22	+4.21
18	Carole Montillet	France	1:18.14	1:16.39	2:34.53	+4.52
19	Nicole Gius	Italy	1:18.58	1:16.96	2:35.54	+5.53
20	Špela Pretnar	Slovenia	1:18.81	1:16.75	2:35.56	+5.55
21	Sarah Schleper	United States	1:18.61	1:17.35	2:35.96	+5.95
22	Annemarie Gerg	Germany	1:18.79	1:17.39	2:36.18	+6.17
23	Eva Kurfürstová	Czech Republic	1:18.92	1:17.28	2:36.20	+6.19
24	Ana Galindo Santolaria	Spain	1:18.84	1:17.39	2:36.23	+6.22
25	Christel Pascal-Saioni	France	1:18.92	1:17.48	2:36.40	+6.39
26	Kirsten L. Clark	United States	1:18.38	1:18.04	2:36.42	+6.41
27	Petra Zakouřilová	Czech Republic	1:19.07	1:17.76	2:36.83	+6.82
28	Alexandra Shaffer	United States	1:19.38	1:18.00	2:37.38	+7.37
29	Noriyo Hiroi	Japan	1:19.85	1:18.12	2:37.97	+7.96
30	Chemmy Alcott	Great Britain	1:20.25	1:18.22	2:38.47	+8.46
31	Janette Hargin	Sweden	1:20.02	1:18.49	2:38.51	+8.50
32	Veronika Zuzulová	Slovakia	1:20.54	1:18.09	2:38.63	+8.62
33	Laure Pequegnot	France	1:19.99	1:19.26	2:39.25	+9.24
34	María Belén Simari Birkner	Argentina	1:20.65	1:18.69	2:39.34	+9.33
35	Kumiko Kashiwagi	Japan	1:19.90	1:19.65	2:39.55	+9.54
36	Nika Fleiss	Croatia	1:20.94	1:19.23	2:40.17	+10.16
37	Ana Jelušić	Croatia	1:21.73	1:18.82	2:40.55	+10.54
38	Emily Brydon	Canada	1:21.03	1:19.59	2:40.62	+10.61
39	Macarena Simari Birkner	Argentina	1:21.87	1:19.68	2:41.55	+11.54
40	Jelena Lolović	FR Yugoslavia	1:20.54	1:21.50	2:42.04	+12.03
41	Alexandra Munteanu	Romania	1:22.20	1:20.00	2:42.20	+12.19
42	Nadejda Vassileva	Bulgaria	1:22.89	1:21.54	2:44.43	+14.42
43	Yuliya Siparenko	Ukraine	1:25.73	1:21.89	2:47.62	+17.61
44	Márta Vastagh Regős	Hungary	1:27.64	1:24.86	2:52.50	+22.49
45	Chirine Njeim	Lebanon	1:27.76	1:25.66	2:53.42	+23.41
46	Tamsen McGarry	Ireland	1:29.18	1:26.91	2:56.09	+26.08
47	Vanesa Rakedzhyan	Armenia	1:42.66	1:21.05	3:03.71	+33.70
48	Mirella Arnhold	Brazil	1:37.44	1:36.30	3:13.74	+43.73
	Vicky Grau	Andorra	1:21.24	DNS		
	Dagný Linda Kristjánsdóttir	Iceland	1:33.07	DNS		
	Selina Heregger	Austria	1:17.93	DNF		
	Lucie Hrstková	Czech Republic	1:18.87	DNF		
	Petra Haltmayr	Germany	1:19.36	DNF		
	Monika Bergmann	Germany	1:19.89	DNF		
	Birgit Heeb-Batliner	Liechtenstein	1:17.29	DSQ		
	Jeannette Korten	Australia	1:19.00	DSQ		
	Jana Nikolovska	Macedonia	DNS			
	Andrine Flemmen	Norway	DNF			
	Stine Hofgaard Nilsen	Norway	DNF			
	Lilian Kummer	Switzerland	DNF			
	Martina Ertl	Germany	DNF			
	Fränzi Aufdenblatten	Switzerland	DNF			
	Alenka Dovžan	Slovenia	DNF			
	Carolina Ruiz Castillo	Spain	DNF			
	Jenny Owens	Australia	DNF			
	Henna Raita	Finland	DNF			
	Yoo Hye-min	South Korea	DNF			
	Sofia Akhmeteli	Georgia	DNF			
	Olesya Persidskaya	Kazakhstan	DNF			
