= Czech Republic at the 2002 Winter Olympics =

- IOC code: CZE
- NOC: Czech Olympic Committee
- Website: www.olympic.cz (in Czech and English)

in Salt Lake City
- Competitors: 76 (57 men, 19 women) in 13 sports
- Flag bearer: Aleš Valenta (freestyle skiing)
- Medals Ranked 16th: Gold 1 Silver 2 Bronze 0 Total 3

Winter Olympics appearances (overview)
- 1994; 1998; 2002; 2006; 2010; 2014; 2018; 2022; 2026

Other related appearances
- Czechoslovakia (1924–1992)

The Czech Republic competed at the 2002 Winter Olympics in Salt Lake City, United States.

== Medalists ==
Medal	Name	Sport	Event
Gold	Aleš Valenta	Freestyle skiing	Men's aerials
Silver	Kateřina Neumannová	Cross country skiing	Women's pursuit
Silver	Kateřina Neumannová	Cross country skiing	Women's 15 km (freestyle)

== Alpine skiing ==
Men

Athlete	Event	Race 1	Race 2	Total	
Athlete	Event	Time	Time	Time	Rank
Jan Holický	Downhill			1:45.49	46
Borek Zakouřil	Downhill			1:43.63	40
Ondřej Bank	Downhill			1:43.33	39
Borek Zakouřil	Super-G			DNF	–
Petr Záhrobský	Super-G			1:25.67	24
Ondřej Bank	Giant Slalom	DNF	–	DNF	–
Petr Záhrobský	Giant Slalom	1:15.82	1:14.14	2:29.96	31
Borek Zakouřil	Giant Slalom	1:15.56	DNF	DNF	–
Stanley Hayer	Giant Slalom	1:14.69	1:13.14	2:27.83	25
Jan Holický	Slalom	DNF	–	DNF	–
Ondřej Bank	Slalom	52.37	DNF	DNF	–
Stanley Hayer	Slalom	51.97	54.15	1:46.12	15

Men's combined

Athlete	Downhill	Slalom		Total	
Athlete	Time	Time 1	Time 2	Total time	Rank
Stanley Hayer	1:45.30	47.15	51.99	3:24.44	10
Jan Holický	1:42.85	50.82	57.48	3:31.15	20
Ondřej Bank	1:42.71	48.25	DNF	DNF	–
Borek Zakouřil	1:41.64	49.52	54.04	3:25.20	12

Women

Athlete	Event	Race 1	Race 2	Total	
Athlete	Event	Time	Time	Time	Rank
Gabriela Martinovová	Downhill			1:44.25	30
Gabriela Martinovová	Super-G			DNF	–
Lucie Hrstková	Super-G			1:16.56	25
Petra Zakouřilová	Giant Slalom	1:19.07	1:17.76	2:36.83	27
Eva Kurfürstová	Giant Slalom	1:18.92	1:17.28	2:36.20	23
Lucie Hrstková	Giant Slalom	1:18.87	DNF	DNF	–
Lucie Hrstková	Slalom	DNF	–	DNF	–
Eva Kurfürstová	Slalom	56.79	57.40	1:54.19	21
Petra Zakouřilová	Slalom	56.22	DNF	DNF	–

Women's combined

Athlete	Downhill	Slalom		Total	
Athlete	Time	Time 1	Time 2	Total time	Rank
Petra Zakouřilová	1:19.90	47.35	44.58	2:51.83	16
Gabriela Martinovová	1:19.17	50.78	48.71	2:58.66	23
Lucie Hrstková	–	DNF	–	DNF	–

== Biathlon ==
Men

Event	Athlete	Misses ^{1}	Time	Rank
10 km sprint	Petr Garabík	2	27:30.9	47
10 km sprint	Roman Dostál	2	27:04.9	34
10 km sprint	Tomáš Holubec	1	27:01.8	32
10 km sprint	Zdeněk Vítek	1	26:14.0	14
12.5 km pursuit ^{2}	Tomáš Holubec	6	37:31.1	45
12.5 km pursuit ^{2}	Roman Dostál	6	37:26.8	44
12.5 km pursuit ^{2}	Zdeněk Vítek	3	34:21.0	17

Event	Athlete	Time	Misses	Adjusted time ^{3}	Rank
20 km	Zdeněk Vítek	52:07.9	6	58:07.9	57
20 km	Ivan Masařík	53:40.6	3	56:40.6	42
20 km	Roman Dostál	52:19.6	4	56:19.6	35
20 km	Petr Garabík	53:12.2	2	55:12.2	25

Men's 4 × 7.5 km relay

Athletes	Race		
Athletes	Misses ^{1}	Time	Rank
Petr Garabík; Ivan Masařík; Roman Dostál; Zdeněk Vítek	0	1'26:36.1	5

Women

Event	Athlete	Misses ^{1}	Time	Rank
7.5 km sprint	Kateřina Losmanová	2	23:14.6	39
7.5 km sprint	Eva Háková	1	23:09.4	34
7.5 km sprint	Magda Rezlerová	2	23:05.0	32
7.5 km sprint	Irena Česneková	0	22:33.5	22
10 km pursuit ^{4}	Magda Rezlerová	4	35:02.9	34
10 km pursuit ^{4}	Irena Česneková	3	34:41.7	31
10 km pursuit ^{4}	Eva Háková	2	34:20.1	25
10 km pursuit ^{4}	Kateřina Losmanová	2	34:04.7	22

Event	Athlete	Time	Misses	Adjusted time ^{3}	Rank
15 km	Eva Háková	49:11.0	3	52:11.0	35
15 km	Irena Česneková	49:28.0	2	51:28.0	28
15 km	Zdeňka Vejnarová	49:54.7	1	50:54.7	23
15 km	Kateřina Losmanová	47:42.0	3	50:42.0	19

Women's 4 × 7.5 km relay

Athletes	Race		
Athletes	Misses ^{1}	Time	Rank
Kateřina Losmanová; Magda Rezlerová; Irena Česneková; Eva Háková	0	1'31:07.6	8

^{1} A penalty loop of 150 metres had to be skied per missed target.
^{2} Starting delay based on 10 km sprint results.
^{3} One minute added per missed target.
^{4} Starting delay based on 7.5 km sprint results.

== Bobsleigh ==
Men

Sled	Athletes	Event	Run 1		Run 2		Run 3		Run 4		Total	
Sled	Athletes	Event	Time	Rank	Time	Rank	Time	Rank	Time	Rank	Time	Rank
CZE-1	Jan Kobián; Pavel Puškár	Two-man	48.22	16	48.03	10	48.35	18	48.50	21	3:13.10	19
CZE-2	Ivo Danilevič; Roman Gomola	Two-man	48.19	15	48.28	20	48.35	18	48.26	16	3:13.08	16

Sled	Athletes	Event	Run 1		Run 2		Run 3		Run 4		Total	
Sled	Athletes	Event	Time	Rank	Time	Rank	Time	Rank	Time	Rank	Time	Rank
CZE-1	Pavel Puškár; Milan Studnička; Peter Kondrát; Ivo Danilevič; Jan Kobián	Four-man	47.23	19	47.17	15	47.58	13	47.95	14	3:09.93	15

== Cross-country skiing ==
Men

Sprint

Athlete	Qualifying round		Quarter finals		Semi finals		Finals	
Athlete	Time	Rank	Time	Rank	Time	Rank	Time	Final rank
Martin Koukal	2:52.09	8 Q	3:02.6	3	did not advance			

Pursuit

Athlete	10 km C		10 km F pursuit^{1}	
Athlete	Time	Rank	Time	Final rank
Milan Šperl	29:04.6	57 Q	27:33.7	52
Martin Koukal	28:26.9	51 Q	26:17.8	44
Lukáš Bauer	27:03.7	20 Q	24:16.3	12

Event	Athlete	Race	
Event	Athlete	Time	Rank
15 km C	Milan Šperl	41:16.7	45
15 km C	Petr Michl	40:00.2	34
15 km C	Jiří Magál	39:48.6	29
30 km F	Jiří Magál	1'17:18.3	43
30 km F	Petr Michl	1'14:40.0	24
30 km F	Martin Koukal	1'14:25.9	20
30 km F	Lukáš Bauer	1'12:22.3	6
50 km C	Milan Šperl	2'28:28.8	49
50 km C	Petr Michl	2'23:43.3	42
50 km C	Jiří Magál	2'15:06.8	19
50 km C	Lukáš Bauer	2'10:41.9	8

^{1} Starting delay based on 10 km C. results.
C = Classical style, F = Freestyle

4 × 10 km relay

Athletes	Race	
Athletes	Time	Rank
Martin Koukal; Jiří Magál; Lukáš Bauer; Petr Michl	1'35:31.3	7

Women

Sprint

Athlete	Qualifying round		Quarter finals		Semi finals		Finals	
Athlete	Time	Rank	Time	Rank	Time	Rank	Time	Final rank
Ilona Bublová	3:29.35	43	did not advance					
Helena Balatková-Erbenová	3:29.23	42	did not advance					
Kateřina Neumannová	3:12.76	1 Q	3:18.9	4	did not advance			

Pursuit

Athlete	5 km C		5 km F pursuit^{2}	
Athlete	Time	Rank	Time	Final rank
Kateřina Hanušová	14:55.0	62	did not advance	
Helena Balatková-Erbenová	14:20.6	41 Q	14:07.6	42
Kamila Rajdlová	14:11.1	32 Q	14:11.4	45
Kateřina Neumannová	13:27.6	6 Q	12:11.8	2nd place, silver medalist(s)

Event	Athlete	Race	
Event	Athlete	Time	Rank
10 km C	Ilona Bublová	32:32.8	49
10 km C	Kamila Rajdlová	30:17.9	26
15 km F	Ilona Bublová	47:31.8	51
15 km F	Helena Balatková-Erbenová	44:17.8	41
15 km F	Kateřina Hanušová	42:15.7	20
15 km F	Kateřina Neumannová	40:01.3	2nd place, silver medalist(s)
30 km C	Kateřina Hanušová	1'48:52.6	40
30 km C	Kamila Rajdlová	1'41:57.7	27

^{2} Starting delay based on 5 km C. results.
C = Classical style, F = Freestyle

4 × 5 km relay

Athletes	Race	
Athletes	Time	Rank
Helena Balatková-Erbenová; Kamila Rajdlová; Kateřina Neumannová; Kateřina Hanušová	50:35.2	4

== Figure skating ==
Pairs

Athletes	Points	SP	FS	Rank
Kateřina Beránková; Otto Dlabola	11.5	7	8	8

Ice Dancing

Athletes	Points	CD1	CD2	OD	FD	Rank
Kateřina Kovalová; David Szurman	40.4	21	21	20	20	20

== Freestyle skiing ==
Men

Athlete	Event	Qualification		Final	
Athlete	Event	Points	Rank	Points	Rank
Aleš Valenta	Aerials	234.51	8 Q	257.02	1st place, gold medalist(s)

Women

Athlete	Event	Qualification			Final		
Athlete	Event	Time	Points	Rank	Time	Points	Rank
Nikola Sudová	Moguls	40.90	21.49	19	did not advance		

== Ice hockey ==
=== Men's tournament ===
==== First round - Group C ====
Team	GP	W	L	T	GF	GA	GD	Pts
Sweden	3	3	0	0	14	4	+10	6
Czech Republic	3	1	1	1	12	7	+5	3
Canada	3	1	1	1	8	10	−2	3
Germany	3	0	3	0	5	18	−13	0

15 February 2002; 19:00	Czech Republic	8 – 2 (3–0, 3–1, 2–1)	Germany	Peaks Ice Arena, Provo; Attendance: 6,303

17 February 2002; 16:05	Sweden	2 – 1 (1–0, 1–1, 0–0)	Czech Republic	E Center, West Valley City; Attendance: 8,599

18 February 2002; 16:10	Czech Republic	3 – 3 (1–1, 1–1, 1–1)	Canada	E Center, West Valley City; Attendance: 8,599

==== Quarter final ====
20 February 2002; 13:30	Czech Republic	0 – 1 (0–0, 0–1, 0–0)	Russia	Peaks Ice Arena, Provo; Attendance: 5,219

- Team roster:
  - Milan Hnilička
  - Roman Čechmánek
  - Dominik Hašek
  - Roman Hamrlík
  - Jaroslav Špaček
  - Pavel Kubina
  - Tomáš Kaberle
  - Michal Sýkora
  - Martin Škoula
  - Richard Šmehlík
  - Martin Havlát
  - Pavel Patera
  - Petr Čajánek
  - Petr Sýkora
  - Radek Dvořák
  - Robert Lang
  - Robert Reichel
  - Milan Hejduk
  - Patrik Eliáš
  - Martin Ručinský
  - Jiří Dopita
  - Jan Hrdina
  - Jaromír Jágr
- Head coach: Josef Augusta

== Luge ==
Men

Athlete	Run 1		Run 2		Run 3		Run 4		Total	
Athlete	Time	Rank	Time	Rank	Time	Rank	Time	Rank	Time	Rank
Michal Kvíčala	46.659	37	45.932	30	46.001	33	45.681	29	3:04.273	30

Women

Athlete	Run 1		Run 2		Run 3		Run 4		Total	
Athlete	Time	Rank	Time	Rank	Time	Rank	Time	Rank	Time	Rank
Markéta Jeriová	44.710	27	43.764	13	43.845	14	43.811	12	2:56.130	19

== Nordic combined ==
Men's sprint

Events:

- large hill ski jumping
- 7.5 km cross-country skiing (Start delay, based on ski jumping results.)

Athlete	Ski Jumping		Cross-country time	Total rank
Athlete	Points	Rank	Cross-country time	Total rank
Milan Kučera	100.2	26	19:13.5	35
Pavel Churavý	102.5	21	17:58.0	15
Petr Šmejc	110.4	10	18:31.9	24

Men's individual

Events:

- normal hill ski jumping
- 15 km cross-country skiing (Start delay, based on ski jumping results.)

Athlete	Ski Jumping		Cross-country time	Total rank
Athlete	Points	Rank	Cross-country time	Total rank
Milan Kučera	182.0	44	48:32.4	41
Ladislav Rygl	189.5	41	46:06.5	39
Petr Šmejc	223.5	19	49:13.7	43
Pavel Churavý	228.5	16	43:11.3	16

Men's Team

Four participants per team.

Events:

- normal hill ski jumping
- 5 km cross-country skiing (Start delay, based on ski jumping results.)

Athletes	Ski jumping		Cross-country time	Total rank
Athletes	Points	Rank	Cross-country time	Total rank
Petr Šmejc; Milan Kučera; Lukáš Heřmanský; Pavel Churavý	892.0	6	53:28.8	9

== Short track speed skating ==
Women

Athlete	Event	Round one		Quarter finals		Semi finals		Finals	
Athlete	Event	Time	Rank	Time	Rank	Time	Rank	Time	Final rank
Kateřina Novotná	500 m	47.122	4	did not advance					
Kateřina Novotná	1000 m	1:42.495	4	did not advance					
Kateřina Novotná	1500 m	2:35.438	3 Q			2:35.085	5	did not advance	

== Skeleton ==
Men

Athlete	Run 1		Run 2		Total	
Athlete	Time	Rank	Time	Rank	Time	Rank
Josef Chuchla	54.02	23	54.64	24	1:48.66	24

== Ski jumping ==
Athlete	Event	Qualifying jump			Final jump 1			Final jump 2		Total	
Athlete	Event	Distance	Points	Rank	Distance	Points	Rank	Distance	Points	Points	Rank
Michal Doležal	Normal hill	81.0	91.5	36 Q	77.0	82.5	50	did not advance			
Jakub Janda	Normal hill	80.5	92.5	34 Q	86.0	103.0	39	did not advance			
Jan Matura	Normal hill	81.5	95.5	32 Q	79.6	91.5	47	did not advance			
Jan Mazoch	Normal hill	88.5	110.0	19 Q	88.0	108.5	35	did not advance			
Michal Doležal	Large hill	99.5	73.1	41	did not advance						
Jan Matura	Large hill	102.5	79.5	37	did not advance						
Jakub Janda	Large hill	108.0	89.4	29 Q	108.5	91.3	44	did not advance			
Jan Mazoch	Large hill	111.0	96.8	23 Q	114.0	102.7	36	did not advance			

Men's team large hill

Athletes	Result	
Athletes	Points ^{1}	Rank
Jan Matura; Michal Doležal; Jan Mazoch; Jakub Janda	724.6	12

^{1} Four teams members performed two jumps each.

== Speed skating ==
Men

Event		Race	
Event		Time	Rank
1000 m	David Kramár	1:14.05	43
