= Alpine skiing at the 2002 Winter Olympics – Women's slalom =

Women's slalom at the XIX Olympic Winter Games
- Pictogram for alpine skiing
- Venue: Deer Valley
- Date: February 20, 2002
- Competitors: 70 from 35 nations
- Winning time: 1:46.10

Medalists
1st place, gold medalist(s)		Janica Kostelić	Croatia
2nd place, silver medalist(s)		Laure Pequegnot	France
3rd place, bronze medalist(s)		Anja Pärson	Sweden

The event was held on February 20, 2002 at the Deer Valley Resort. Kostelic and Pärson both won medals for the second time in the Olympics.

== Results ==
Complete results from the women's slalom event at the 2002 Winter Olympics.

Rank	Name	Country	Run 1	Run 2	Time	Difference
1st place, gold medalist(s)	Janica Kostelić	Croatia	52.14	53.96	1:46.10	
2nd place, silver medalist(s)	Laure Pequegnot	France	52.32	53.85	1:46.17	+0.07
3rd place, bronze medalist(s)	Anja Pärson	Sweden	52.57	54.52	1:47.09	+0.99
4	Ylva Nowén	Sweden	53.08	54.10	1:47.18	+1.08
5	Martina Ertl	Germany	54.08	53.74	1:47.82	+1.72
6	Monika Bergmann	Germany	54.18	53.80	1:47.98	+1.88
7	Vanessa Vidal	France	53.70	54.41	1:48.11	+2.01
8	Henna Raita	Finland	54.75	53.65	1:48.40	+2.30
9	Nataša Bokal	Slovenia	55.02	54.92	1:49.94	+3.84
10	Nicole Gius	Italy	55.57	55.44	1:51.01	+4.91
11	Claudia Riegler	New Zealand	55.17	56.02	1:51.19	+5.09
12	Nika Fleiss	Croatia	55.39	55.88	1:51.27	+5.17
13	Anna Ottosson	Sweden	55.32	56.45	1:51.77	+5.67
14	Noriyo Hiroi	Japan	56.35	55.63	1:51.98	+5.88
15	María José Rienda Contreras	Spain	56.18	55.93	1:52.11	+6.01
16	Kumiko Kashiwagi	Japan	56.14	56.27	1:52.41	+6.31
17	Alenka Dovžan	Slovenia	55.73	56.92	1:52.65	+6.55
18	Silke Bachmann	Italy	55.69	57.25	1:52.94	+6.84
19	Emma Carrick-Anderson	Great Britain	56.25	57.54	1:53.79	+7.69
20	Špela Pretnar	Slovenia	55.16	58.93	1:54.09	+7.99
21	Eva Kurfürstová	Czech Republic	56.79	57.40	1:54.19	+8.09
22	Susanne Ekman	Sweden	57.10	57.22	1:54.32	+8.22
23	Ana Jelušić	Croatia	57.42	57.59	1:55.01	+8.91
24	Vicky Grau	Andorra	58.13	57.03	1:55.16	+9.06
25	Jeannette Korten	Australia	57.85	58.25	1:56.10	+10.00
26	Carolina Ruiz Castillo	Spain	57.72	58.50	1:56.22	+10.12
27	Emily Brydon	Canada	58.58	59.61	1:58.19	+12.09
28	Nadejda Vassileva	Bulgaria	59.59	59.45	1:59.04	+12.94
29	Vanessa Rakedjian	Armenia	58.59	1:00.53	1:59.12	+13.02
30	Yulia Siparenko	Ukraine	59.63	1:00.87	2:00.50	+14.40
31	María Belén Simari Birkner	Argentina	59.59	1:00.99	2:00.58	+14.48
32	Lindsey Kildow	United States	56.84	1:03.89	2:00.73	+14.63
33	Emma Furuvik	Iceland	1:00.39	1:01.53	2:01.92	+15.82
34	Olesia Persidskaya	Kazakhstan	1:03.98	1:05.99	2:09.97	+23.87
35	Tamsen McGarry	Ireland	1:05.44	1:05.56	2:11.00	+24.90
36	Chirine Njeim	Lebanon	1:05.54	1:07.94	2:13.48	+27.38
37	Konstantina Koutra	Greece	1:09.19	1:09.41	2:18.60	+32.50
38	Elmira Urumbayeva	Uzbekistan	1:14.51	1:10.39	2:24.90	+38.80
	Tanja Poutiainen	Finland	52.46	DNF		
	Sonja Nef	Switzerland	53.32	DNF		
	Marlies Oester	Switzerland	53.64	DNF		
	Corina Grünenfelder	Switzerland	54.13	DNF		
	Renate Götschl	Austria	54.31	DNF		
	Carina Raich	Austria	55.10	DNF		
	Christine Sponring	Austria	55.42	DNF		
	Petra Zakouřilová	Czech Republic	56.22	DNF		
	Jelena Lolović	FR Yugoslavia	58.87	DNF		
	Rowena Bright	Australia	1:00.22	DNF		
	Márta Vastagh Regős	Hungary	1:17.66	DNF		
	Alexandra Munteanu	Romania	DNS			
	Tamara Schädler	Liechtenstein	DNS			
	Christel Pascal-Saioni	France	DNF			
	Kristina Koznick	United States	DNF			
	Hedda Berntsen	Norway	DNF			
	Trine Bakke	Norway	DNF			
	Sarah Schleper	United States	DNF			
	Marlies Schild	Austria	DNF			
	Veronika Zuzulová	Slovakia	DNF			
	Annemarie Gerg	Germany	DNF			
	Zali Steggall	Australia	DNF			
	Allison Forsyth	Canada	DNF			
	Lea Dabič	Slovenia	DNF			
	Tasha Nelson	United States	DNF			
	Denise Karbon	Italy	DNF			
	Kathrin Nikolussi	Australia	DNF			
	Chemmy Alcott	Great Britain	DNF			
	Lucie Hrstková	Czech Republic	DNF			
	Sonia Vierin	Italy	DNF			
	Macarena Simari Birkner	Argentina	DNF			
	Sofia Akhmeteli	Georgia	DNF			
