= Alpine skiing at the 2002 Winter Olympics – Women's combined =

Women's combined at the XIX Olympic Winter Games
- Pictogram for alpine skiing
- Venue: Snowbasin
- Date: February 14, 2002
- Competitors: 31 from 14 nations
- Winning time: 2:43.28

Medalists
1st place, gold medalist(s)		Janica Kostelić	Croatia
2nd place, silver medalist(s)		Renate Götschl	Austria
3rd place, bronze medalist(s)		Martina Ertl	Germany

The women's combined took place on February 14, 2002.

== Results ==
The results of the women's combined event in Alpine skiing at the 2002 Winter Olympics.

Rank	Name	Country	Slalom 1	Slalom 2	Downhill	Time	Difference
1st place, gold medalist(s)	Janica Kostelić	Croatia	44.60	42.68	1:16.00	2:43.28	+0.00
2nd place, silver medalist(s)	Renate Götschl	Austria	45.66	43.84	1:15.27	2:44.77	+1.49
3rd place, bronze medalist(s)	Martina Ertl	Germany	45.10	43.28	1:16.78	2:45.16	+1.88
4	Marlies Oester	Switzerland	45.88	43.46	1:17.27	2:46.61	+3.33
5	Michaela Dorfmeister	Austria	46.76	44.24	1:15.85	2:46.85	+3.57
6	Lindsey Kildow	United States	45.95	45.49	1:16.61	2:48.05	+4.77
7	Geneviève Simard	Canada	45.76	44.12	1:18.26	2:48.14	+4.86
8	Catherine Borghi	Switzerland	47.39	44.52	1:16.88	2:48.79	+5.51
9	Jenny Owens	Australia	47.37	44.98	1:16.96	2:49.31	+6.03
10	Sara-Maude Boucher	Canada	46.37	44.90	1:18.10	2:49.37	+6.09
11	Selina Heregger	Austria	47.00	45.40	1:17.29	2:49.69	+6.41
12	Alice Jones	Australia	47.80	44.59	1:17.83	2:50.22	+6.94
13	Julia Mancuso	United States	47.66	46.07	1:17.60	2:51.33	+8.05
14	Chemmy Alcott	Great Britain	47.27	45.01	1:19.06	2:51.34	+8.06
15	Daniela Ceccarelli	Italy	48.35	46.71	1:16.75	2:51.81	+8.53
16	Petra Zakouřilová	Czech Republic	47.35	44.58	1:19.90	2:51.83	+8.55
17	Macarena Simari Birkner	Argentina	48.14	45.55	1:19.21	2:52.90	+9.62
18	Lucia Recchia	Italy	48.88	46.94	1:17.28	2:53.10	+9.82
19	Elena Tagliabue	Italy	49.03	47.27	1:17.66	2:53.96	+10.68
20	María Belén Simari Birkner	Argentina	49.29	46.69	1:19.94	2:55.92	+12.64
21	Patrizia Bassis	Italy	52.16	49.20	1:16.72	2:58.08	+14.80
22	Alexandra Munteanu	Romania	50.77	48.23	1:19.53	2:58.53	+15.25
23	Gabriela Martinovová	Czech Republic	50.78	48.71	1:19.17	2:58.66	+15.38
24	Rowena Bright	Australia	1:04.95	45.72	1:19.46	3:10.68	+27.40
	Petra Haltmayr	Germany	47.05	45.27	DNF		
	Janette Hargin	Sweden	46.14	44.18	DNF		
	Hilde Gerg	Germany	47.70	45.57	DNF		
	Dagný Linda Kristjánsdóttir	Iceland	50.24	47.92	DNF		
	Caroline Lalive	United States	1:02.45	DNS			
	Christine Sponring	Austria	DNF				
	Lucie Hrstková	Czech Republic	DNF				
