= Alpine skiing at the 2006 Winter Olympics – Women's giant slalom =

Women's giant slalom at the XX Olympic Winter Games
- Alpine skiing
- Venue: Sestriere
- Date: February 24, 2006
- Competitors: 65 from 38 nations
- Winning time: 2:09.19

Medalists
| 1st place, gold medalist(s) | | Julia Mancuso | United States |
| 2nd place, silver medalist(s) | | Tanja Poutiainen | Finland |
| 3rd place, bronze medalist(s) | | Anna Ottosson | Sweden |

The last event of the women's alpine skiing, the giant slalom, took place on Friday, 24 February. Kostelić was a favourite once again, as she was defending Olympic champion, but Swede Anja Pärson led the World Cup and was defending World Champion of the event. Kostelić was second in the World Cup standing, however, while Austrian Kathrin Zettel was third.

== Results ==
Complete results from the women's Giant slalom event at the 2006 Winter Olympics.

| Rank | Name | Country | Run 1 | Run 2 | Time | Difference |
|---|---|---|---|---|---|---|
| 1st place, gold medalist(s) | Julia Mancuso | United States | 1:00.89 | 1:08.30 | 2:09.19 | |
| 2nd place, silver medalist(s) | Tanja Poutiainen | Finland | 1:01.21 | 1:08.65 | 2:09.86 | +0.67 |
| 3rd place, bronze medalist(s) | Anna Ottosson | Sweden | 1:02.04 | 1:08.29 | 2:10.33 | +1.14 |
| 4 | Nicole Hosp | Austria | 1:01.26 | 1:09.40 | 2:10.66 | +1.47 |
| 5 | Geneviève Simard | Canada | 1:01.47 | 1:09.26 | 2:10.73 | +1.54 |
| 6 | Anja Pärson | Sweden | 1:01.07 | 1:09.89 | 2:10.96 | +1.77 |
| 7 | Kathrin Zettel | Austria | 1:01.95 | 1:09.40 | 2:11.35 | +2.16 |
| 8 | Nadia Fanchini | Italy | 1:01.77 | 1:09.69 | 2:11.46 | +2.27 |
| 9 | Ana Drev | Slovenia | 1:02.45 | 1:09.22 | 2:11.67 | +2.48 |
| 10 | Maria Pietilä-Holmner | Sweden | 1:02.00 | 1:09.69 | 2:11.69 | +2.50 |
| 11 | Brigitte Acton | Canada | 1:02.07 | 1:09.64 | 2:11.71 | +2.52 |
| 12 | Tina Maze | Slovenia | 1:01.97 | 1:09.86 | 2:11.83 | +2.64 |
| 13 | María José Rienda Contreras | Spain | 1:02.28 | 1:09.85 | 2:12.13 | +2.94 |
| 14 | Karen Putzer | Italy | 1:02.46 | 1:10.01 | 2:12.47 | +3.28 |
| 15 | Martina Ertl-Renz | Germany | 1:01.44 | 1:11.10 | 2:12.54 | +3.35 |
| 16 | Fränzi Aufdenblatten | Switzerland | 1:03.46 | 1:09.16 | 2:12.62 | +3.43 |
| 17 | Marlies Schild | Austria | 1:02.68 | 1:10.59 | 2:13.27 | +4.08 |
| 18 | Jessica Lindell-Vikarby | Sweden | 1:02.12 | 1:11.24 | 2:13.36 | +4.17 |
| 19 | Nika Fleiss | Croatia | 1:03.27 | 1:10.16 | 2:13.43 | +4.24 |
| 20 | Carolina Ruiz Castillo | Spain | 1:03.18 | 1:10.36 | 2:13.54 | +4.35 |
| 21 | Ingrid Jacquemod | France | 1:02.56 | 1:11.49 | 2:14.05 | +4.86 |
| 22 | Chemmy Alcott | Great Britain | 1:04.47 | 1:09.95 | 2:14.42 | +5.23 |
| 23 | Stacey Cook | United States | 1:03.35 | 1:11.09 | 2:14.44 | +5.25 |
| 24 | Nadia Styger | Switzerland | 1:01.87 | 1:12.58 | 2:14.45 | +5.26 |
| 25 | Dagmara Krzyżyńska | Poland | 1:03.86 | 1:12.05 | 2:15.91 | +6.72 |
| 26 | Noriyo Hiroi | Japan | 1:04.63 | 1:12.03 | 2:16.66 | +7.47 |
| 27 | Petra Zakouřilová | Czech Republic | 1:03.93 | 1:13.07 | 2:17.00 | +7.81 |
| 28 | Eva Hučková | Slovakia | 1:05.24 | 1:13.07 | 2:18.31 | +9.12 |
| 29 | Soňa Maculová | Slovakia | 1:05.77 | 1:12.84 | 2:18.61 | +9.42 |
| 30 | Jelena Lolović | Serbia and Montenegro | 1:05.00 | 1:13.84 | 2:18.84 | +9.65 |
| 31 | Macarena Simari Birkner | Argentina | 1:05.81 | 1:13.62 | 2:19.43 | +10.24 |
| 32 | Kirsten McGarry | Ireland | 1:08.19 | 1:14.68 | 2:22.87 | +13.68 |
| 33 | O Jae-eun | South Korea | 1:08.22 | 1:16.25 | 2:24.47 | +15.28 |
| 34 | Tiiu Nurmberg | Estonia | 1:08.39 | 1:16.70 | 2:25.09 | +15.90 |
| 35 | Yulia Siparenko | Ukraine | 1:10.43 | 1:15.50 | 2:25.93 | +16.74 |
| 36 | Vera Yeremenko | Kazakhstan | 1:10.32 | 1:19.43 | 2:29.75 | +20.56 |
| 37 | Duygu Ulusoy | Turkey | 1:11.43 | 1:19.38 | 2:30.81 | +21.62 |
| 38 | Dong Jinzhi | China | 1:11.61 | 1:24.11 | 2:35.72 | +26.53 |
| 39 | Magda Kalomoirou | Greece | 1:15.28 | 1:21.17 | 2:36.45 | +27.26 |
| 40 | Ivana Ivchevska | Macedonia | 1:13.89 | 1:23.47 | 2:37.36 | +28.17 |
| 41 | Réka Tuss | Hungary | 1:16.12 | 1:23.70 | 2:39.82 | +30.63 |
| 42 | Neha Ahuja | India | 1:15.59 | 1:25.72 | 2:41.31 | +32.12 |
| 43 | Mirella Arnhold | Brazil | 1:20.17 | 1:29.00 | 2:49.17 | +39.98 |
| | Michaela Kirchgasser | Austria | 1:02.22 | DNF | | |
| | Denise Karbon | Italy | 1:02.90 | DNF | | |
| | Sarah Schleper | United States | 1:02.01 | DNF | | |
| | Annemarie Gerg | Germany | 1:03.04 | DNF | | |
| | Šárka Záhrobská | Czech Republic | 1:03.61 | DNF | | |
| | Ana Jelušić | Croatia | 1:05.19 | DNF | | |
| | Lucie Hrstková | Czech Republic | 1:03.21 | DNF | | |
| | Chirine Njeim | Lebanon | 1:06.80 | DNF | | |
| | Matea Ferk | Croatia | 1:06.67 | DNF | | |
| | Jana Gantnerová | Slovakia | 1:06.73 | DNF | | |
| | Bianca Narea | Romania | 1:10.89 | DNF | | |
| | Janica Kostelić | Croatia | DNS | | | |
| | Lindsey Kildow | United States | DNS | | | |
| | Mojca Rataj | Bosnia and Herzegovina | DNS | | | |
| | Manuela Mölgg | Italy | DNF | | | |
| | Christina Lustenberger | Canada | DNF | | | |
| | María Belén Simari Birkner | Argentina | DNF | | | |
| | Alexandra Coletti | Monaco | DNF | | | |
| | Nicola Campbell | New Zealand | DNF | | | |
| | Dagný L. Kristjánsdóttir | Iceland | DNF | | | |
| | Erika McLeod | New Zealand | DNF | | | |
| | Olesya Alieva | Russia | DSQ | | | |
