= 2002 Alpine Skiing World Cup – Women's Super G =

2002 Women's super-G World Cup
Previous: 2001	Next: 2003

Women's super-G World Cup 2001/2002

== Final point standings ==
In women's super-G World Cup 2001/02 all results count.

Place	Name	Country	Total points	6 (Canada)	8 (France)	11 (Switzerland)	23 (Italy)	32 (Austria)
1	Hilde Gerg	Germany	355	50	100	45	100	60
2	Alexandra Meissnitzer	Austria	248	18	50	404	60	80
3	Michaela Dorfmeister	Austria	212	40	40	-	32	100
4	Renate Götschl	Austria	210	32	80	18	80	-
5	Karen Putzer	Italy	192	8	32	100	36	16
6	Caroline Lalive	Canada	167	60	36	24	11	36
7	Daniela Ceccarelli	Italy	158	4	29	80	45	-
8	Stefanie Schuster	Austria	137	-	12	60	20	45
9	Carole Montillet	France	129	80	-	-	29	20
10	Tanja Schneider	Austria	122	9	60	-	13	40
11	Kirsten Clark	United States	121	12	8	60	15	26
12	Petra Haltmayr	Germany	114	100	9	-	5	-
13	Pernilla Wiberg	Sweden	103	36	45	22	-	-
14	Brigitte Obermoser	Austria	99	20	15	11	24	29
15	Martina Ertl	Germany	97	13	18	16	-	50
16	Corinne Rey-Bellet	Switzerland	87	15	-	-	40	32
17	Geneviève Simard	Canada	86	24	-	32	6	2429
18	Melanie Turgeon	Canada	81	29	16	-	14	22
19	Janica Kostelić	Croatia	72	-	22	-	50	-
	Sylviane Berthod	Switzerland	72	-	20	26	26	-
21	Warwara Zelenskaja	Russia	67	10	13	6	18	20
22	Melanie Suchet	France	61	45	-	-	16	-
23	Janette Hargin	Sweden	60	-	2	36	22	-
24	Jonna Mendes	United States	44	26	6	-	12	-
25	Patrizia Bassis	Italy	42	24	10	8	-	-
26	Kathleen Monahan	United States	41	6	11	14	10	-
27	Isolde Kostner	Italy	38	14	24	-	-	-
	Eveline Rohregger	Austria	38	5	14	16	3	-
29	Mojca Suhadolc	Slovenia	33	-	26	-	7	-
30	Elena Tagliabue	Italy	32	-	3	29	-	-
31	Lucia Recchia	Italy	28	-	-	20	8	-
32	Ingrid Rumpfhuber	Austria	27	18	-	9	-	-
33	Selina Heregger	Austria	25	11	-	14	-	-
34	Ingrid Jacquemod	France	15	1	-	12	2	-
35	Lindsey Kildow	United States	12	-	5	7	-	-
36	Carlonia Ruiz Castillo	Spain	10	-	-	10	-	-
37	Sibylle Brauner	Germany	9	-	4	5	-	-
	Julia Mancuso	United States	9	-	-	-	9	-
39	Astrid Vierthaler	Austria	8	8	-	-	-	-
40	Merete Fjeldavlie	Norway	7	-	7	-	-	-
41	Catherine Borghi	Switzerland	5	-	-	5	-	-
	Karine Meilleur	France	5	3	-	2	-	-
43	Sara-Maud Boucher	Canada	4	-	-	-	4	-
44	Ingeborg Helen Marken	Norway	3	2	1	-	-	-
	Martina Lechner	Austria	3	-	-	3	-	-
46	Regina Häusl	Switzerland	1	-	-	1	-	-
	Tamara Müller	Switzerland	1	-	-	-	1	-

Alpine skiing World Cup
Women

Overall | Downhill | Super-G | Giant slalom | Slalom | Combined

2002
