= 2002 Alpine Skiing World Cup – Women's combined =

2002 Women's combined World Cup
Previous: 2001	Next: 2003

Women's combined World Cup 2001/2002

== Final point standings ==
In women's combined World Cup 2001/02 both results count.

Place	Name	Country	Total points	20 (Austria)	29 (Sweden)
1	Renate Götschl	Austria	200	100	100
2	Michaela Dorfmeister	Austria	96	60	36
3	Brigitte Obermoser	Austria	82	32	50
4	Janica Kostelić	Croatia	80	80	-
	Janette Hargin	Sweden	80	-	80
6	Stefanie Schuster	Austria	66	26	40
7	Selina Heregger	Austria	60	-	60
8	Daniela Ceccarelli	Italy	54	22	32
9	Hilde Gerg	Germany	50	50	-
10	Catherine Borghi	Switzerland	47	18	29
11	Isabelle Huber	Germany	46	20	26
12	Pernilla Wiberg	Sweden	45	45	-
	Britt Janyk	Canada	45	-	45
14	Caroline Lalive	United States	40	40	-
15	Petra Haltmayr	Germany	36	36	-
16	Astrid Vierthaler	Austria	29	29	-
17	Julia Mancuso	United States	24	24	-
	Elena Tagliabue	Italy	24	-	24
19	Anna Prchal	Canada	22	-	22
20	Alexandra Meissnitzer	Austria	20	-	20
21	Alice Jones	Australia	16	16	-
22	Pia Käyhkö	Finland	15	15	-

Alpine skiing World Cup
Women

Overall | Downhill | Super-G | Giant slalom | Slalom | Combined

2002
