= Lustenberger =

Lustenberger is a surname, and may refer to:

- Karl Lustenberger (born 1952), a Swiss Nordic combined skier
- Christina Lustenberger (born 1984, British Columbia), a Canadian alpine skier
- Samuel Lustenberger (born 1985), a Swiss-born Dominican Republic footballer
- Claudio Lustenberger (born 1987), a Swiss football defender
- Fabian Lustenberger (born 1988, Nebikon), a Swiss footballer
