= Hrstka =

Hrstka (feminine Hrstková) is a Czech surname. Notable people with the surname include:

- Antonín Hrstka (1908–?), Czech rower
- Jakub Hrstka (born 1990), Czech handball player
- Lubomír Hrstka (1946–2025), Czech ice hockey player, coach and businessman
- Lucie Hrstková-Pešánová (born 1981), Czech alpine skier
