= Hiroi =

Hiroi (written: 廣井) is a Japanese surname. Notable people with the surname include:

- Noriyo Hiroi (廣井 法代, born 1976), Japanese alpine skier
- Oji Hiroi (広井 王子, born 1954), real name Teruhisa Hiroi (廣井 照久), Japanese manga artist
- Tomonobu Hiroi (廣井 友信, born 1985), Japanese footballer
