= Noriyo =

- Gender: Female

Origin
- Origin: Japanese
- Meaning: Different meanings depending on the kanji used

Noriyo (のりよ, ノリヨ) is a unisex Japanese given name. Notable people with the name include:

== Written forms ==
Noriyo can be written using different kanji characters and can mean:

as a given name

- 記代, "note, teenager"
- 法代, "law, teenager"

The given name can also be written in hiragana and katakana.

- のりよ, in hiragana
- ノリヨ, in katakana

== People with the name ==
- Noriyo Hiroi (廣井 法代; born 1976), Japanese alpine skier
- Noriyo Tateno (立野 記代; born 1965), Japanese professional wrestler
- Noriyo Toyoda (豊田 記代; born 1967), Japanese professional wrestler
