= Lucie Neumannová =

Czech athlete (born 2003)

Personal information
- Nationality: Czech Republic
- Born: 2 July 2003 (age 23) Prague

Sport
- Club: TJ Dukla Prague

Achievements and titles
- Personal bests: 800 m : 2:13.78 (Zlín, 2024); 400 m : 59.51 (Mladá Boleslav, 2023); 4x400 m : 3:54.47 (Nové Město nad Metují, 2024)

Lucie Neumannová (born 2 July 2003) is a Czech athlete and influencer.

== Education ==
At the age of fourteen, she enrolled at Emilio Sanchez's tennis academy in Florida, where she focused on sports training.

She studies at the University of New York in Prague, which focuses on supporting athletes and allows them to combine sports and academic careers.

== Sports career ==
She first devoted herself to tennis, but later switched to athletics, which she has continued to pursue. In an interview, she described the transition as natural, because athletics offered her greater freedom and less competitive pressure than tennis, which she had been involved in since childhood.

She competes for the athletics club TJ Dukla Praha and specializes in middle-distance running, specifically the 400 metres and 800 metres.

== Influencer activity ==
On social media, she shares moments from both her sports career and her everyday life. As of January 2025, she had 115,000 followers on Instagram.

== Personal life ==
In 2024, she began a relationship with tennis player Jiří Lehečka. She is the daughter of Kateřina Neumannová and Josef Jindra. In the past, Jindra was Kateřina Neumannová's coach and also worked as her manager. According to media interviews, Lucie Neumannová has not been in contact with her father for several years.
