= Kathrin Nikolussi =

Australian alpine skier (born 1978)

Personal information
- Nationality: Australian
- Born: 4 June 1978 (age 47) Feldkirch, Vorarlberg, Austria

Sport
- Sport: Alpine skiing
- Event: Slalom

Kathrin Nikolussi (born 4 June 1978) is an Australian alpine skier. She competed in the women's slalom at the 2002 Winter Olympics.
