= Konstantina Koutra =

Greek alpine skier (born 1979)

Personal information
- Nationality: Greek
- Born: 17 October 1979 (age 45); Larissa, Greece

Sport
- Sport: Alpine skiing

Konstantina Koutra (born 17 October 1979) is a Greek alpine skier. She competed in the women's slalom at the 2002 Winter Olympics.
