= Petr Michl =

Czech cross-country skier

- Country: Czech Republic
- Born: 3 November 1970 (age 54); Opočno, Czechoslovakia
- Height: 178 cm (5 ft 10 in)
- Sports career
- Sport: Cross-country skiing
- Club: Dukla Liberec

Petr Michl (born 3 November 1970) is a Czech former cross-country skier. He competed at the 1998, the 2002 and the 2006 Winter Olympics.

He made his FIS Cross-Country World Cup debut in January 1996 in Štrbské Pleso. He finished in lowly positions until the early stages of the 1996-97 FIS Cross-Country World Cup, when he scored a 10th place in the 15 kilometre freestyle race in Brusson. Further finishes in the top 25 came in January 1998 in Ramsau (24th), January 1999 in Nové Město (16th), the Holmenkollen ski festival of 2004 (18th) and February 2005 in Reit im Winkl (24th). His last World Cup outing was in November 2005 in Kuusamo.

Michl competed at the FIS Nordic World Ski Championships in 1997, 1999, 2001, 2003 and 2005. His best individual finish was a 16th place in the 50 kilometres in 2003. In the 4x10 kilometre relay, he recorded a 7th place in 2003 and 8th in 2005.

His best Olympic results were almost identical, namely a 17th place in the 50 kilometre freestyle of the 1998 Olympics; and a 7th place in the 4 × 10 kilometre relay of the 2002 Olympics. The 7th places in relay as well as and 16th and 17th places in the 50 kilometres are considered his best achievements.

He represented the club Dukla Liberec.

== See also ==
- Czech Republic at the 1998 Winter Olympics
- Czech Republic at the 2002 Winter Olympics
- Czech Republic at the 2006 Winter Olympics
