= Samuel Lustenberger =

Dominican footballer (born 1985)

Personal information
- Full name: Samuel Lustenberger
- Date of birth: 20 January 1985 (age 41)
- Place of birth: Lucerne, Switzerland
- Height: 1.78 m (5 ft 10 in)
- Position: Midfielder

Team information
- Current team: FC Altdorf

Senior career*
Years	Team	Apps	(Gls)
2005–2006	FC Luzern II	21	(0)
2006–2008	SC Cham	67	(1)
2008–2010	FC Emmenbrücke	27	(2)
2010–2013	FC Ibach	80	(24)
2013–2014	SC Cham	21	(0)
2014–2015	FC Küssnacht	18	(4)
2015	Cibao FC	5	(0)
2017-2019	FC Altdorf	49	(9)
2020-2024	FC Sins		
2024-	Luzerner SC		

International career^{‡}
2013	Dominican Republic	3	(0)
- * Club domestic league appearances and goals as of 30 August 2014 ‡ National team caps and goals as of 8 December 2025

Samuel Lustenberger (born 20 January 1985) is a former footballer who currently plays as a midfielder. He is the cousin of fellow footballer Claudio Lustenberger. Born in Switzerland, he represented the Dominican Republic national team.

== International career ==
Lustenberger lived in the Dominican Republic when he was between 2 and 15 years old. He played his first match for the Dominican on the 24 March 2013 against Haiti.
