= Romania at the 2002 Winter Olympics =

- IOC code: ROU (ROM used at these Games)
- NOC: Romanian Olympic and Sports Committee
- Website: www.cosr.ro (in Romanian, English, and French)

in Salt Lake City
- Competitors: 21 (11 men, 10 women) in 8 sports
- Flag bearer: Éva Tófalvi (biathlon)
- Medals: Gold 0 Silver 0 Bronze 0 Total 0

Winter Olympics appearances (overview)
- 1928; 1932; 1936; 1948; 1952; 1956; 1960; 1964; 1968; 1972; 1976; 1980; 1984; 1988; 1992; 1994; 1998; 2002; 2006; 2010; 2014; 2018; 2022; 2026

Romania competed at the 2002 Winter Olympics in Salt Lake City, United States.

== Alpine skiing ==
Women

Athlete	Event	Race 1	Race 2	Total	
Athlete	Event	Time	Time	Time	Rank
Alexandra Munteanu	Downhill			1:46.29	33
Alexandra Munteanu	Super-G			1:17.84	29
Alexandra Munteanu	Giant Slalom	1:22.20	1:20.00	2:42.20	41

Women's combined

Athlete	Downhill	Slalom		Total	
Athlete	Time	Time 1	Time 2	Total time	Rank
Alexandra Munteanu	1:19.53	50.77	48.23	2:58.53	22

== Biathlon ==
Men

Event	Athlete	Misses ^{1}	Time	Rank
10 km sprint	Marian Blaj	1	27:25.5	42
12.5 km pursuit ^{2}	Marian Blaj	6	39:31.2	55

Event	Athlete	Time	Misses	Adjusted time ^{3}	Rank
20 km	Marian Blaj	54:36.8	3	57:36.8	51

Women

Event	Athlete	Misses ^{1}	Time	Rank
7.5 km sprint	Alexandra Rusu-Stoian	6	27:20.0	72
7.5 km sprint	Éva Tófalvi	3	24:43.7	61
7.5 km sprint	Dana Plotogea-Cojocea	1	24:17.3	55
10 km pursuit ^{4}	Dana Plotogea-Cojocea	DNF	DNF	–

Event	Athlete	Time	Misses	Adjusted time ^{3}	Rank
15 km	Dana Plotogea-Cojocea	52:37.0	5	57:37.0	61
15 km	Éva Tófalvi	51:36.7	3	54:36.7	52

^{1} A penalty loop of 150 metres had to be skied per missed target.
^{2} Starting delay based on 10 km sprint results.
^{3} One minute added per missed target.
^{4} Starting delay based on 7.5 km sprint results.

== Bobsleigh ==
Men

Sled	Athletes	Event	Run 1		Run 2		Run 3		Run 4		Total	
Sled	Athletes	Event	Time	Rank	Time	Rank	Time	Rank	Time	Rank	Time	Rank
ROU-1	Adrian Duminicel; Florian Enache	Two-man	48.52	26	48.51	24	48.65	25	48.75	26	3:14.43	25

Sled	Athletes	Event	Run 1		Run 2		Run 3		Run 4		Total	
Sled	Athletes	Event	Time	Rank	Time	Rank	Time	Rank	Time	Rank	Time	Rank
ROU-1	Florian Enache; Adrian Duminicel; Iulian Păcioianu; Teodor Demetriad	Four-man	47.59	22	47.66	23	48.19	22	48.22	20	3:11.66	21

Women

Sled	Athletes	Event	Run 1		Run 2		Total	
Sled	Athletes	Event	Time	Rank	Time	Rank	Time	Rank
ROU-1	Erika Kovacs; Maria Spirescu	Two-woman	50.12	14	50.62	15	1:40.74	15

== Cross-country skiing ==
Men

Sprint

Athlete	Qualifying round		Quarter finals		Semi finals		Finals	
Athlete	Time	Rank	Time	Rank	Time	Rank	Time	Final rank
Zsolt Antal	3:05.24	46	did not advance					

Pursuit

Athlete	10 km C		10 km F pursuit^{1}	
Athlete	Time	Rank	Time	Final rank
Zsolt Antal	29:13.0	59	did not advance	

Event	Athlete	Race	
Event	Athlete	Time	Rank
30 km F	Zsolt Antal	1'14:47.1	26

^{1} Starting delay based on 10 km C. results.
C = Classical style, F = Freestyle

== Figure skating ==
Men

Athlete	Points	SP	FS	Rank
Gheorghe Chiper	32.5	23	21	23

Women

Athlete	Points	SP	FS	Rank
Roxana Luca	35.0	24	23	23

== Luge ==
Men

Athlete	Run 1		Run 2		Run 3		Run 4		Total	
Athlete	Time	Rank	Time	Rank	Time	Rank	Time	Rank	Time	Rank
Eugen Radu	56.608	49	46.096	32	46.299	36	46.324	34	3:15.327	44
Marian Tican	46.486	35	46.346	36	46.115	35	46.352	35	3:05.299	34
Ion Cristian Stanciu	46.176	32	46.203	34	46.080	34	46.155	31	3:04.614	32

(Men's) Doubles

Athletes	Run 1		Run 2		Total	
Athletes	Time	Rank	Time	Rank	Time	Rank
Eugen Radu; Marian Tican	43.901	15	43.945	16	1:27.846	15
Ion Cristian Stanciu; Robert Taleanu	43.977	16	43.979	17	1:27.956	16

== Short track speed skating ==
Women

Athlete	Event	Round one		Quarter finals		Semi finals		Finals	
Athlete	Event	Time	Rank	Time	Rank	Time	Rank	Time	Final rank
Katalin Kristo	500 m	46.956	3	did not advance					
Katalin Kristo	1000 m	1:42.276	3	did not advance					
Katalin Kristo	1500 m	2:28.709	4	did not advance					

== Speed skating ==
Women

Event	Athlete	Race	
Event	Athlete	Time	Rank
1000 m	Andrea Jakab	1:19.60	34
1500 m	Daniela Oltean	2:04.48	36
1500 m	Andrea Jakab	2:02.23	31
3000 m	Daniela Oltean	4:21.73	29
3000 m	Andrea Jakab	4:17.03	24
