= Ivana Janečková =

Czech cross-country skier (born 1984)

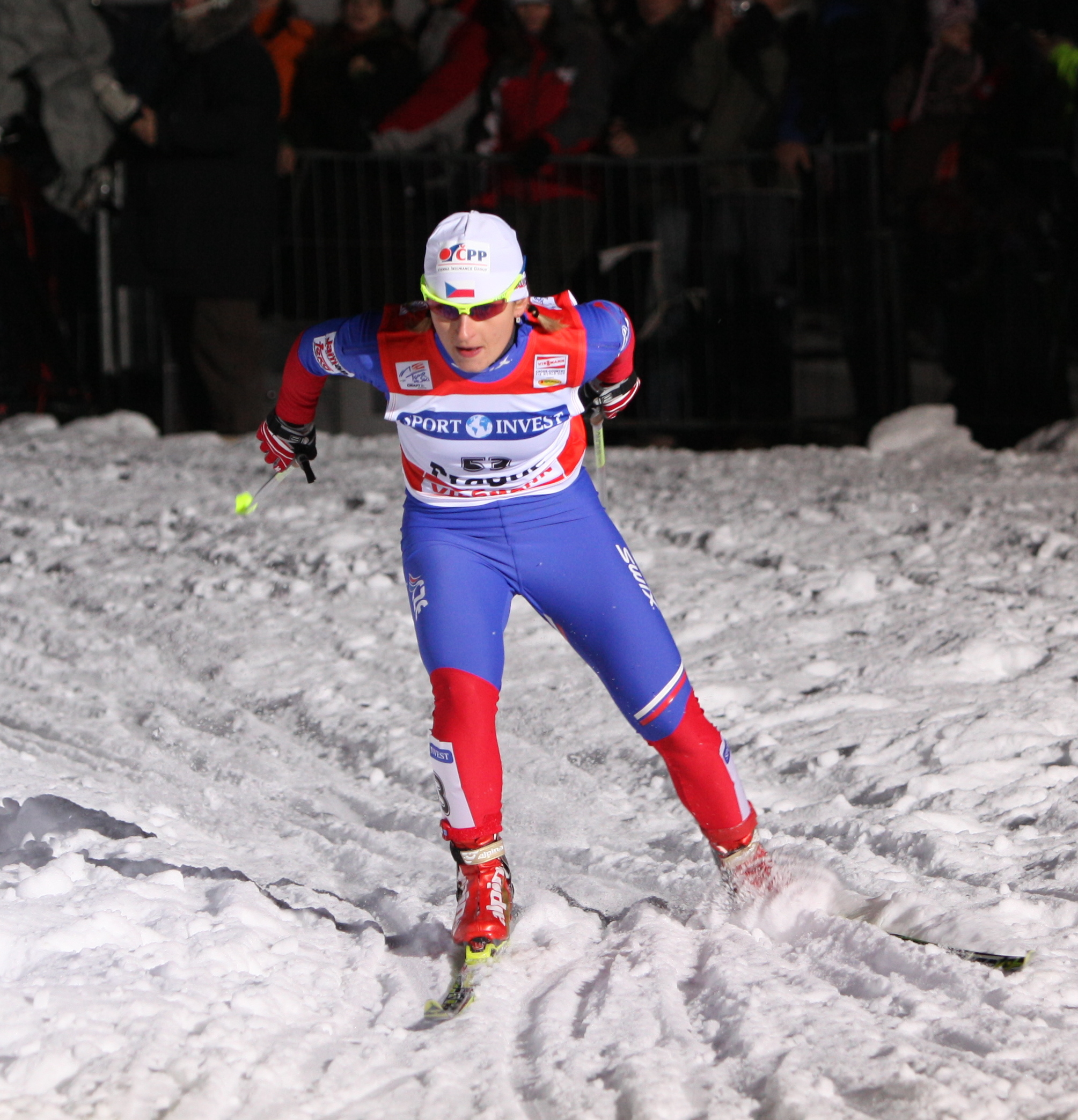
- Ivana Janečková in 2010

Personal information
- Nationality: Czech Republic
- Born: March 8, 1984 (age 42) Rychnov nad Kněžnou, Czechoslovakia

Sport
- Sport: Skiing
- Club: SKP Jablonex Jablonec

World Cup career
- Seasons: 10 – (2003–2012)
- Indiv. starts: 72
- Indiv. podiums: 0
- Team starts: 8
- Team podiums: 1
- Team wins: 0
- Overall titles: 0 – (63rd in 2010)
- Discipline titles: 0
Medal record
Women's cross-country skiing
Representing Czech Republic
U23 World Championships
Bronze medal – third place	2007 Tarvisio	15 km skiathlon
Junior World Championships
Silver medal – second place	2004 Stryn	4 × 5 km relay

Ivana Janečková (born March 8, 1984, in Rychnov nad Kněžnou) is a Czech cross-country skier who competed between 2002 and 2012. Her best finish at the FIS Nordic World Ski Championships was fifth in the 4 × 5 km relay at Sapporo in 2007 while her best individual finish was 21st in the 30 km event at those same championships.

Janečková's best individual finish at the Winter Olympics was 23rd in 7.5 km + 7.5 km double pursuit at Turin in 2006.

Her best individual World Cup finish was 22nd in a 15 km event in France in 2006.

== Cross-country skiing results ==
All results are sourced from the International Ski Federation (FIS).

=== Olympic Games ===
Year	Age	10 km individual	15 km skiathlon	30 km mass start	Sprint	4 × 5 km relay	Team sprint
2006	22	—	23	27	—	6	—
2010	26	32	DNS	40	—	12	—

=== World Championships ===
Year	Age	10 km individual	15 km skiathlon	30 km mass start	Sprint	4 × 5 km relay	Team sprint
2005	21	33	DNS	—	—	6	11
2007	23	32	—	21	—	5	—
2009	25	43	32	DNS	—	12	9
2011	27	—	22	20	—	—	12

=== World Cup ===
==== Season standings ====
Season	Age	Discipline standings			Ski Tour standings		
Season	Age	Overall	Distance	Sprint	Nordic Opening	Tour de Ski	World Cup Final
2003	19	NC	—N/a	—	—N/a	—N/a	—N/a
2004	20	89	72	—	—N/a	—N/a	—N/a
2005	21	NC	NC	—	—N/a	—N/a	—N/a
2006	22	79	59	—	—N/a	—N/a	—N/a
2007	23	81	57	—	—N/a	—	—N/a
2008	24	103	72	NC	—N/a	35	—
2009	25	92	83	NC	—N/a	—	28
2010	26	63	47	NC	—N/a	24	—
2011	27	75	66	NC	DNF	27	—
2012	28	101	74	—	—	40	—

==== Team podiums ====
- 1 podium – (1 RL)

No.	Season	Date	Location	Race	Level	Place	Teammates
1	2006–07	17 December 2006	La Clusaz, France	4 × 5 km Relay C/F	World Cup	3rd	Erbenová / Rajdlová / Neumannová
