= Josef Chuchla =

Czech skeleton racer (born 1973)

Josef Chuchla (born 27 June 1973) is a Czech skeleton racer who competed from 1994 to 2003. He finished 24th in the men's skeleton event at the 2002 Winter Olympics in Salt Lake City.

Chuchla's best finish at the FIBT World Championships was 21st in the men's skeleton event at Calgary in 2001.
