= Geneviève Simard =

Canadian alpine skier (born 1980)

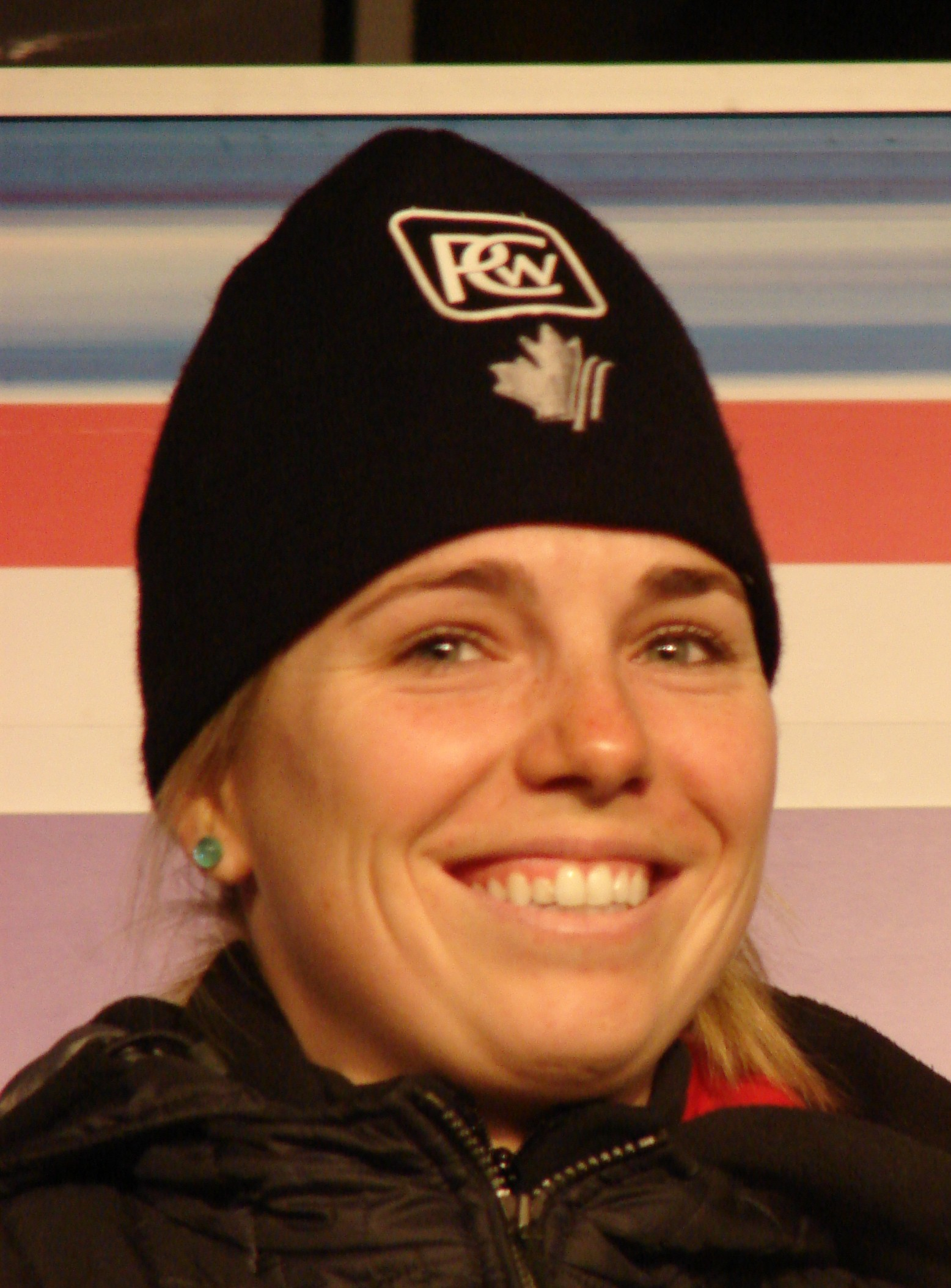

Personal information
- Born: November 5, 1980 (age 45) Montreal, Quebec, Canada
- Height: 1.7 m (5 ft 7 in)

Skiing career
- Sport: Alpine skiing
- Club: Val St-Come Montcalm Ski Club
- Disciplines: Giant slalom, super-G, downhill

Olympics
- Teams: 2 (2002, 2006)
- Medals: 0 (0 gold)

World Championships
- Teams: 4
- Medals: 0 (0 gold)

World Cup
- Seasons: 8
- Wins: 1
- Podiums: 5
- Overall titles: 0
- Discipline titles: 0

Geneviève Simard (born November 5, 1980) is a Canadian alpine skier. She has appeared in two Winter Olympics, in 2002 and 2006. She is now a helicopter pilot featured in Hélico tous terrains, a Quebec TV show about a bush helicopter pilot working in Quebec's north coast.

== Olympics ==
=== 2006 ===
- Finished 20th in the super-G
- Finished 5th in the giant slalom

=== 2002 ===
- Finished 18th in the super-G
- Finished 7th in the combined

== World championships ==
Simard raced in the World Championships in 1999, 2003, 2005 and 2007. Her best finish was fourth in the 2003 super-G.

== World Cup ==
Since making her World Cup debut in November 1998, Simard has won one race, on January 14, 2004, in a super-G race in Cortina d'Ampezzo in Italy.
