= Jan Holický =

Czech alpine skier (born 1974)

Personal information
- Full name: Jan Holický
- Nationality: Czech
- Born: 15 January 1974 (age 51); Teplice, Czechoslovakia

Sport
- Sport: Alpine skiing

Jan Holický (born 15 January 1974) is a Czech alpine skier. He competed in three events at the 2002 Winter Olympics in Salt Lake City.
