= Marian Tican =

Romanian luger (born 1978)

Personal information
- Nationality: Romanian
- Born: 28 May 1978 (age 46); Sinaia, Romania

Sport
- Sport: Luge

Marian Tican (born 28 May 1978) is a Romanian luger. He competed in the men's singles and doubles events at the 2002 Winter Olympics.
