= Lubomír Hrstka =

Czech ice hockey player and businessman (1946–2025)

PaedDr. Lubomír Hrstka
- Born: 28 November 1946 Brno, Czechoslovakia
- Died: 8 October 2025 (aged 78)
- Height: 184 cm (6 ft 0 in)
- Weight: 84 kg (185 lb; 13 st 3 lb)
- Position: Defenseman
- Played for: TJ ZKL/Zetor Brno

Lubomír Hrstka (28 November 1946 – 8 October 2025) was a Czech ice hockey player, coach and businessman. He was the owner of FC Boby Brno from 1992 to 2000 and the Brno Bobycentrum.

Hrstka died on 8 October 2025, at the age of 78.

== Hockey career ==
He played for TJ ZKL/Zetor Brno in the Czechoslovak league. He played 13 league seasons, appeared in 451 league games, scored 33 league goals and had 66 assists. A tough defender with a good shot.

== Life ==
He graduated from the Faculty of Education, Masaryk University. In 1993 he opened a hotel complex with a disco and shops, Bobycentrum, in Brno. At the end of the 1990s his company was declared bankrupt due to debts exceeding 2 billion crowns. In 2001 he was sentenced to three years in prison for damaging a creditor.

He died in October 2025 after a serious illness.

== Club statistics ==
Season	Club	Competition	Regular season					
Season	Club	Competition	Z	G	A	B	TM	
1967/1968	TJ ZKL Brno	1. league	22	4	1	5	-	
1968/1969	TJ ZKL Brno	1. league	12	1	1	2	-	
1969/1970	TJ ZKL Brno	1st league	18	2	1	3	-	
1970/1971	TJ ZKL Brno	1st league	44	2	5	7	-	
1971/1972	TJ ZKL Brno	1st league	36	2	2	4	26	
1972/1973	TJ ZKL Brno	1st league	league	36	3	7	10	30
1973/1974	TJ ZKL Brno	1st league	44	1	15	16	-	
1974/1975	TJ ZKL Brno	1st league	33	2	6	8	-	
1975/1976	TJ ZKL Brno	1st league	33	2	4	6	-	
1976/1977	TJ Zetor Brno	1st league	42	2	0	2	-	
1977/1978	TJ Zetor Brno	1st league	44	5	4	9	45	
1978/1979	TJ Zetor Brno	1st league	44	2	6	8	42	
1979/1980	TJ Zetor Brno	1st league	liga	44	5	14	19	46

== Coaching career ==
As head coach he led TJ Zetor Brno in the top league.

== See also ==
- FC Zbrojovka Brno
- HC Kometa Brno
