= Helena Erbenová =

Czech skier and triathelete (born 1979)

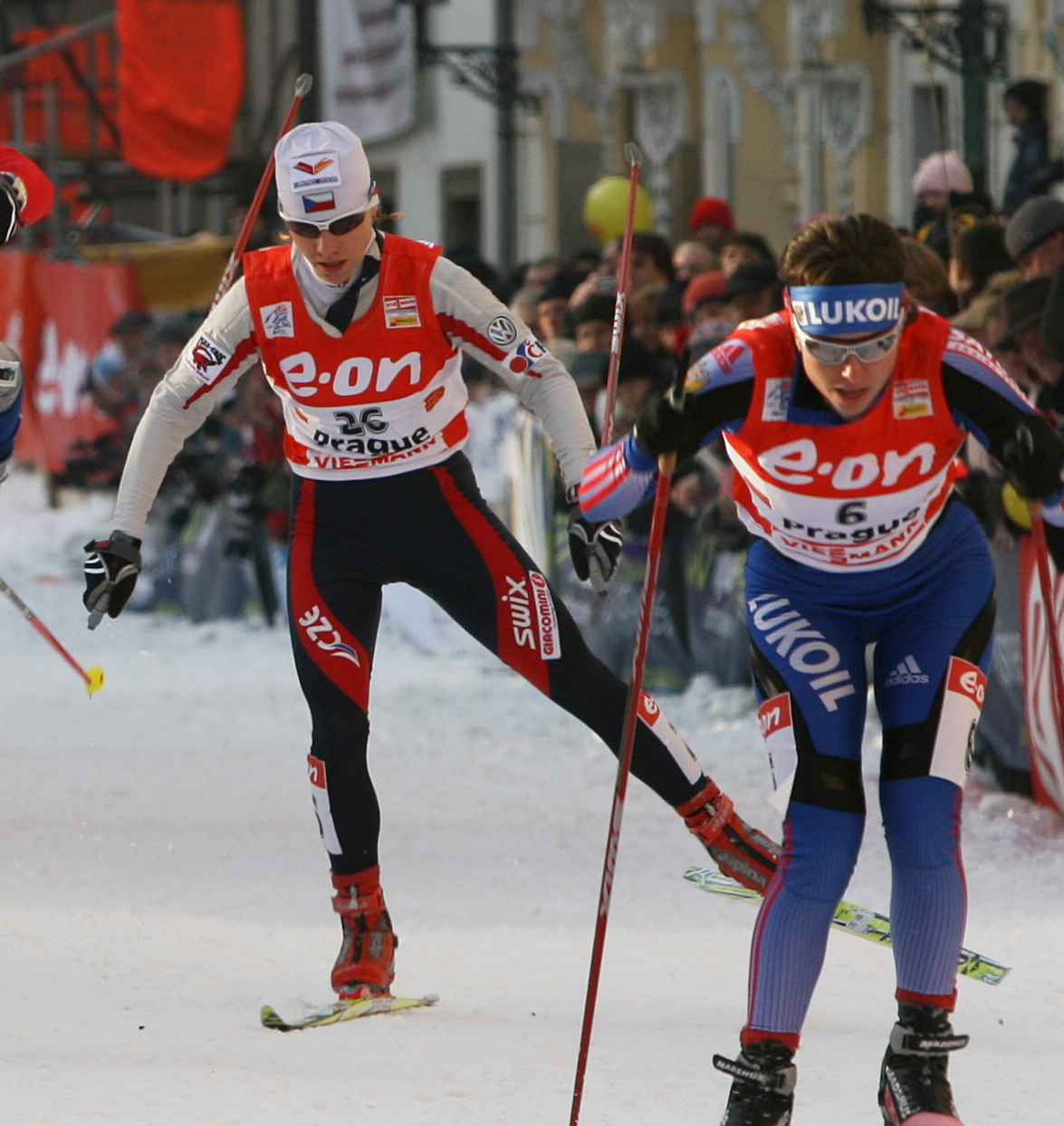
- Erbenová in 2007

Personal information
- Nationality: Czech Republic
- Born: 6 February 1979 (age 47) Jablonec nad Nisou, Czechoslovakia

Sport
- Sport: Skiing
- Club: SKP Jablonex Jablonec

World Cup career
- Seasons: 12 – (1998–2009)
- Indiv. starts: 72
- Indiv. podiums: 0
- Team starts: 14
- Team podiums: 1
- Team wins: 0
- Overall titles: 0 – (63rd in 2007)
- Discipline titles: 0
Medal record
Women's triathlon
Representing Czech Republic
ITU Winter Triathlon World Championships
Gold medal – first place	2012 Jämijärvi	Elite
Bronze medal – third place	2025 Cogne	Elite
ITU Cross Triathlon World Championships
Gold medal – first place	2013 The Hague	Elite
Bronze medal – third place	2014 Zittau	Elite
XTERRA Triathlon World Championships
Bronze medal – third place	2019 Kapalua	Elite
Bronze medal – third place	2011 Kapalua	Elite

Helena Erbenová (née Balatková; born 6 February 1979) is a Czech cross-country skier and triathlete. She is the winner of the 2012 ITU Winter Triathlon World Championships.

== Career ==
=== Cross-country skiing ===
Erbenová has been competing cross-country skiing since 1997. She finished fifth in the 4 × 5 km relay at the 2007 FIS Nordic World Ski Championships in Sapporo and earned her best individual finish of 20th in the sprint at the 2001 championships in Lahti. Erbenová's best Winter Olympic finish was 29th in the 7.5 km + 7.5 km double pursuit at Turin in 2006. She has a total of nine individual victories, all in FIS races, at distances up to the 7.5 km + 7.5 km double pursuit since 2000. Erbenová's best individual World Cup finish was 13th in a 15 km event in Russia in 2007.

=== Triathlon ===
Erbenová 2011 XTERRA Triathlon World Championships where she took 3rd place.

The next year, in 2012, Erbenová became the ITU Winter Triathlon World Championship. She also won the European Winter Triathlon champion and the 2012 and European Cross Triathlon champion.

In 2014 Erbenová placed third at the 2014 ITU Cross Triathlon World Championships.

== Cross-country skiing results ==
All results are sourced from the International Ski Federation (FIS).

=== Olympic Games ===
Year	Age	10 km	15 km	Pursuit	30 km	Sprint	4 × 5 km relay	Team sprint
2002	23	—	41	42	—	42	4	—N/a
2006	27	—	—N/a	29	39	—	6	12

=== World Championships ===
Year	Age	10 km	15 km	Pursuit	30 km	Sprint	4 × 5 km relay	Team sprint
2001	22	42	—	40	CNX^{[a]}	20	8	—N/a
2003	24	35	—	33	—	—	8	—N/a
2005	26	54	—N/a	—	31	40	6	11
2007	28	49	—N/a	43	—	—	5	—
2009	30	—	—N/a	41	38	50	12	—

a. ^{1} Cancelled due to extremely cold weather.

=== World Cup ===
==== Season standings ====
Season	Age	Discipline standings					Ski Tour standings	
Season	Age	Overall	Distance	Long Distance	Middle Distance	Sprint	Tour de Ski	World Cup Final
1998	19	NC	—N/a	NC	—N/a	—	—N/a	—N/a
1999	20	NC	—N/a	NC	—N/a	—	—N/a	—N/a
2000	21	NC	—N/a	—	NC	—	—N/a	—N/a
2001	22	82	—N/a	—N/a	—N/a	66	—N/a	—N/a
2002	23	93	—N/a	—N/a	—N/a	NC	—N/a	—N/a
2003	24	78	—N/a	—N/a	—N/a	—	—N/a	—N/a
2004	25	87	71	—N/a	—N/a	NC	—N/a	—N/a
2005	26	NC	NC	—N/a	—N/a	—	—N/a	—N/a
2006	27	NC	NC	—N/a	—N/a	NC	—N/a	—N/a
2007	28	63	44	—N/a	—N/a	57	36	—N/a
2008	29	71	54	—N/a	—N/a	69	36	34
2009	30	NC	NC	—N/a	—N/a	NC	—	—

==== Team podiums ====
- 1 podium – (1 RL)

No.	Season	Date	Location	Race	Level	Place	Teammates
1	2006–07	17 December 2006	La Clusaz, France	4 × 5 km Relay C/F	World Cup	3rd	Rajdlová / Janečková / Neumannová

== Personal life ==
Erbenová is the daughter of Czech skier Helena Balatková-Šikolová. She has two sisters Kateřina and Petra who also were skier. Kateřina's husband is Czech skier Lukáš Bauer.
