= Kateřina Neumannová =

Czech cross-country skier

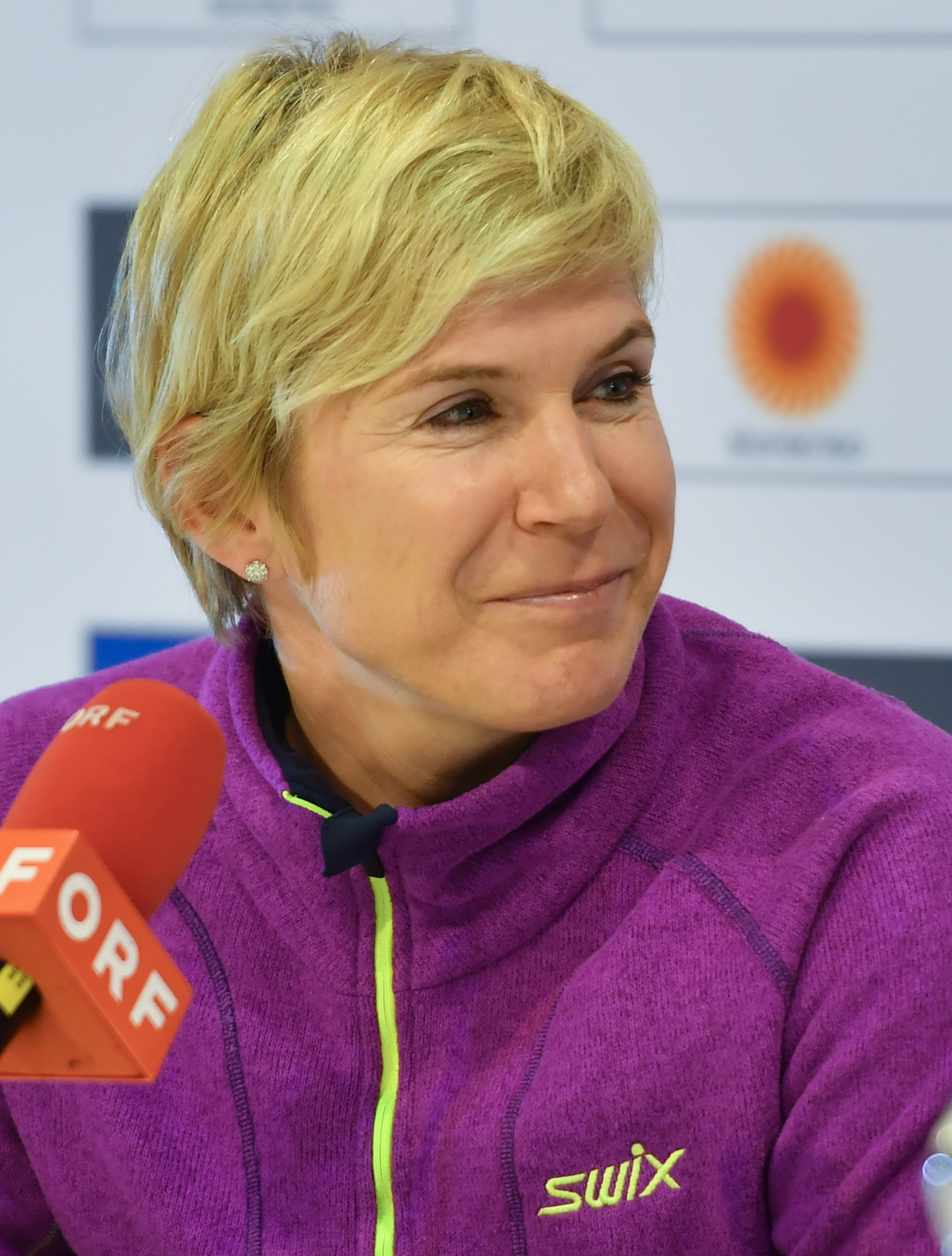
- Kateřina Neumannová in 2019

Personal information
- Nationality: Czech Republic
- Born: 15 February 1973 (age 53) Písek, Czechoslovakia

Sport
- Sport: Skiing
- Club: TJ Dukla Liberec

World Cup career
- Seasons: 16 – (1991–2002, 2004–2007)
- Indiv. starts: 170
- Indiv. podiums: 49
- Indiv. wins: 19
- Team starts: 20
- Team podiums: 2
- Team wins: 1
- Overall titles: 0 – (2nd in 2005)
- Discipline titles: 0
Medal record
Women's cross-country skiing
Representing Czech Republic
Olympic Games
Gold medal – first place	2006 Turin	30 km freestyle
Silver medal – second place	1998 Nagano	5 km classical
Silver medal – second place	2002 Salt Lake City	5 km + 5 km combined pursuit
Silver medal – second place	2002 Salt Lake City	15 km freestyle
Silver medal – second place	2006 Turin	15 km double pursuit
Bronze medal – third place	1998 Nagano	5 km + 10 km combined pursuit
World Championships
Gold medal – first place	2005 Oberstdorf	10 km freestyle
Gold medal – first place	2007 Sapporo	10 km freestyle
Silver medal – second place	2007 Sapporo	15 km double pursuit
Bronze medal – third place	1997 Trondheim	15 km freestyle
Bronze medal – third place	1999 Ramsau	5 km classical
Junior World Championships
Gold medal – first place	1993 Harrachov	5 km classical
Bronze medal – third place	1993 Harrachov	15 km freestyle
Representing Czechoslovakia
Junior World Championships
Gold medal – first place	1992 Vuokatti	5 km classical
Silver medal – second place	1991 Reit im Winkl	5 km classical
Silver medal – second place	1992 Vuokatti	4 × 5 km relay

Kateřina Neumannová (Czech pronunciation: [ˈkatɛr̝ɪna ˈnojmanovaː]) (born 15 February 1973) is a Czech retired cross-country skier. She won an Olympic gold medal in the 2006 Winter Olympics, in the 30 km freestyle event. She is one of five cross country skiers to have competed at six Olympics.

She was also the first Czech woman to appear in both a Summer and Winter Olympics, having participated in the mountain biking event at the 1996 Summer Olympics.

Neumannová retired after the 2006-07 World Cup season.

== Career overview ==
She was a flatwater canoeist and downhill skier before moving to cross country skiing at sixteen. Neumannová made her first appearance in the Winter Olympics in 1992 in Albertville. Her goal was only to gain experience. However, in all races (both individual and relay) she belonged to the best Czechoslovak athletes. Two years later, in Lillehammer, she was already among the best. She was 8th in 5 km classical and 6th in combination with 10 km free.

Her training during summer involved riding a mountain bike and when the sport become popular she decided to begin racing. In 1995, she won a bronze medal at the European Championships, and she also qualified for the 1996 Summer Olympics in Atlanta.

Although cross-country skiing remained her main sport and her summer training was usually lighter, she took preparations for Atlanta seriously. "This time I left out the pleasant period and started abruptly. Thanks to it I achieved results in athletic tests that I last run in junior categories," she said before the Olympics. But her preparations were not in the best conditions. She practised in cold weather in Šumava while great heat was expected for the Atlanta race. On 31 July 1996, she became the first Czech female athlete to compete on both Winter and Summer Olympics when starting in the mountain bike race at the Georgia International Horse Park in Conyers, Georgia, United States. She fell off the bike early in the race. "I overrun about 15 racers but then a terrible crisis came upon me. I did not race anymore, I just wanted to finish," she described the race. She mainly complained about the terrible heat and said it was one of her worst experiences.

=== First major medal ===
Neumannová started the 1996/1997 season with a fourth place in the World Cup opener. The race took place in Kiruna and was run on 5 km free. Neumannová was content with the result but complained about soft snow she did not like. "If the track was more firm, I believe I would stand on the platform", she commented. At the end of the year she clearly dominated the Czech Championships on 5 km free and 10 km classic. She commented it was mainly training for her as the main goal for the season was World Championships. For it she announced a goal to finish among best six.

Only two weeks later, on 11 and 12 January, she achieved two second places in the World Cup. It was again on the 5 km and 10 km distances, but this time it was 5 km classic and 10 km free. The race was run in Hakuba, Japan on the tracks ready for 1998 Winter Olympics

On 17 February 2005, she won the 10 km free at the Nordic skiing World Championships. Neumannová defended her 10 km free title at the following championships in Sapporo on 27 February 2007.

On 24 February 2006, in her 20th and final Olympic race, Neumannová won her sixth Olympic medal, but first Winter Olympic gold medal in the 30 km freestyle mass start and became the oldest winner in the event.

On 14 January 2007 Neumannová received the title Czech Sportsperson of the Year 2006, a trophy awarded by journalists in the Czech Republic.

== 2009 FIS Nordic World Ski Championships ==
In late 2006, Neumannová was named an honorary vice president of the organizing committee for the FIS Nordic World Ski Championships 2009 in Liberec, the Czech Republic. On 25 July 2007, she succeeded Roman Kumpost as chair of the organizing committee for the 2009 championships.

== Cross-country skiing results ==
All results are sourced from the International Ski Federation (FIS).

=== Olympic Games ===
- 6 medals – (1 gold, 4 silver, 1 bronze)

Year	Age	5 km	10 km	15 km	Pursuit	30 km	Sprint	4 × 5 km relay	Team sprint
1992	19	13	—N/a	14	22	—	—N/a	6	—N/a
1994	21	8	—N/a	14	6	—	—N/a	9	—N/a
1998	25	Silver	—N/a	9	Bronze	—	—N/a	6	—N/a
2002	29	—N/a	—	Silver	Silver	—	13	4	—N/a
2006	33	—N/a	5	—N/a	Silver	Gold	—	6	—

=== World Championships ===
- 5 medals – (2 gold, 1 silver, 2 bronze)

Year	Age	5 km	10 km	15 km	Pursuit	30 km	Sprint	4 × 5 km relay	Team sprint
1991	18	15	—	28	—N/a	—	—N/a	8	—N/a
1993	20	8	—N/a	16	5	—	—N/a	5	—N/a
1995	22	11	—N/a	7	13	DNF	—N/a	8	—N/a
1997	24	6	—N/a	Bronze	4	—	—N/a	5	—N/a
1999	26	Bronze	—N/a	DNF	DNF	—	—N/a	7	—N/a
2001	28	—N/a	—	9	DNS	CNX^{[a]}	—	—	—N/a
2005	32	—N/a	Gold	—N/a	7	7	—	6	—
2007	34	—N/a	Gold	—N/a	Silver	—	—	5	—

a. ^{1} Cancelled due to extremely cold weather.

=== World Cup ===
==== Season standings ====
Season	Age	Discipline standings					Ski Tour standings
Season	Age	Overall	Distance	Long Distance	Middle Distance	Sprint	Tour de Ski
1991	18	46	—N/a	—N/a	—N/a	—N/a	—N/a
1992	19	19	—N/a	—N/a	—N/a	—N/a	—N/a
1993	20	7	—N/a	—N/a	—N/a	—N/a	—N/a
1994	21	12	—N/a	—N/a	—N/a	—N/a	—N/a
1995	22	14	—N/a	—N/a	—N/a	—N/a	—N/a
1996	23	8	—N/a	—N/a	—N/a	—N/a	—N/a
1997	24	3rd place, bronze medalist(s)	—N/a	8	—N/a	3rd place, bronze medalist(s)	—N/a
1998	25	15	—N/a	46	—N/a	9	—N/a
1999	26	6	—N/a	18	—N/a	2nd place, silver medalist(s)	—N/a
2000	27	17	—N/a	20	18	17	—N/a
2001	28	9	—N/a	—N/a	—N/a	12	—N/a
2002	29	2nd place, silver medalist(s)	—N/a	—N/a	—N/a	3rd place, bronze medalist(s)	—N/a
2004	31	9	8	—N/a	—N/a	21	—N/a
2005	32	2nd place, silver medalist(s)	2nd place, silver medalist(s)	—N/a	—N/a	41	—N/a
2006	33	5	2nd place, silver medalist(s)	—N/a	—N/a	—	—N/a
2007	34	3rd place, bronze medalist(s)	2nd place, silver medalist(s)	—N/a	—N/a	24	5

==== Individual podiums ====
- 19 victories – (18 WC, 1 SWC)
- 49 podiums – (48 WC, 1 SWC)

No.	Season	Date	Location	Race	Level	Place
1	1992–93	12 December 1992	Ramsau, Austria	5 km Individual C	World Cup	1st
2	1995–96	9 December 1995	Davos, Switzerland	5 km Individual F	World Cup	2nd
3	1995–96	4 February 1996	Reit im Winkl, Germany	1.0 km Sprint F	World Cup	3rd
4	1996–97	11 January 1997	Hakuba, Japan	5 km Individual C	World Cup	2nd
5	1996–97	12 January 1997	Hakuba, Japan	10 km Pursuit F	World Cup	2nd
6	1996–97	21 February 1997	Trondheim, Norway	15 km Individual F	World Championships^{[1]}	3rd
7	1996–97	8 March 1997	Falun, Sweden	5 km Individual F	World Cup	3rd
8	1997–98	22 November 1997	Beitostølen, Norway	5 km Individual C	World Cup	3rd
9	1997–98	8 January 1998	Ramsau, Austria	10 km Individual C	World Cup	3rd
10	1997–98	9 January 1998	Ramsau, Austria	5 km Individual C	World Cup	3rd
11	1998–99	28 November 1998	Muonio, Finland	5 km Individual F	World Cup	1st
12	1998–99	12 December 1998	Toblach, Italy	5 km Individual F	World Cup	1st
13	1998–99	9 January 1999	Nové Město, Czech Republic	10 km Individual C	World Cup	2nd
14	1998–99	22 February 1999	Ramsau, Austria	5 km Individual C	World Championships^{[1]}	3rd
15	1998–99	9 January 1999	Lahti, Finland	10 km Individual C	World Cup	3rd
16	1999–00	28 December 1999	Garmisch-Partenkirchen, Germany	1.5 km Sprint F	World Cup	3rd
17	2000–01	17 December 2000	Brusson, Italy	1.0 km Sprint F	World Cup	2nd
18	2000–01	10 January 2001	Soldier Hollow, United States	5 km + 5 km Pursuit C/F	World Cup	1st
19	2001–02	25 November 2001	Kuopio, Finland	5 km Individual F	World Cup	1st
20	2001–02	9 December 2001	Cogne, Italy	1.5 km Sprint F	World Cup	1st
21	2001–02	29 December 2001	Salzburg, Austria	1.5 km Sprint F	World Cup	2nd
22	2001–02	5 January 2002	Val di Fiemme, Italy	5 km + 5 km Pursuit C/F	World Cup	3rd
23	2001–02	6 January 2002	Val di Fiemme, Italy	1.5 km Sprint F	World Cup	1st
24	2001–02	12 January 2002	Nové Město, Czech Republic	5 km Individual F	World Cup	2nd
25	2003–04	20 December 2003	Ramsau, Austria	10 km Individual F	World Cup	1st
26	2003–04	6 January 2004	Falun, Sweden	7.5 km + 7.5 km Pursuit C/F	World Cup	1st
27	2003–04	17 January 2004	Nové Město, Czech Republic	10 km Individual C	World Cup	3rd
28	2003–04	6 February 2004	La Clusaz, France	10 km Individual F	World Cup	1st
29	2003–04	21 February 2004	Umeå, Sweden	10 km Individual C	World Cup	1st
30	2003–04	13 March 2004	Pragelato, Italy	15 km Individual F	World Cup	3rd
31	2004–05	26 November 2004	Rukatunturi, Finland	10 km Individual F	World Cup	1st
32	2004–05	28 November 2004	Rukatunturi, Finland	10 km Individual C	World Cup	2nd
33	2004–05	8 January 2005	Otepää, Estonia	10 km Individual C	World Cup	3rd
34	2004–05	15 January 2005	Nové Město, Czech Republic	10 km Individual F	World Cup	1st
35	2004–05	22 January 2005	Pragelato, Italy	7.5 km + 7.5 km Pursuit C/F	World Cup	2nd
36	2004–05	6 March 2005	Lahti, Finland	10 km Individual F	World Cup	2nd
37	2004–05	12 March 2005	Oslo, Norway	30 km Individual C	World Cup	2nd
38	2004–05	19 March 2005	Falun, Sweden	7.5 km + 7.5 km Pursuit C/F	World Cup	2nd
39	2005–06	27 November 2005	Rukatunturi, Finland	10 km Individual F	World Cup	1st
40	2005–06	31 December 2005	Nové Město, Czech Republic	10 km Individual F	World Cup	1st
41	2005–06	14 January 2006	Lago di Tesero, Italy	15 km Mass Start F	World Cup	1st
42	2005–06	21 January 2006	Oberstdorf, Germany	7.5 km + 7.5 km Pursuit C/F	World Cup	3rd
43	2005–06	8 March 2006	Falun, Sweden	5 km + 5 km Pursuit C/F	World Cup	2nd
44	2005–06	11 March 2006	Oslo, Norway	30 km Individual F	World Cup	2nd
45	2006–07	18 November 2006	Gällivare, Sweden	10 km Individual F	World Cup	1st
46	2006–07	7 January 2007	Cavalese, Italy	10 km Individual F	Stage World Cup	1st
47	2006–07	20 January 2007	Rybinsk, Russia	15 km Mass Start F	World Cup	2nd
48	2006–07	16 February 2007	Changchun, China	10 km Individual F	World Cup	1st
49	2006–07	24 March 2007	Falun, Sweden	7.5 km + 7.5 km Pursuit C/F	World Cup	2nd

==== Team podiums ====
- 1 victory – (1 TS)
- 2 podiums – (1 RL, 1 TS)

No.	Season	Date	Location	Race	Level	Place	Teammate(s)
1	1998–99	8 March 1999	Vantaa, Finland	Team Sprint F	World Cup	1st	Hanušová
2	2006–07	17 December 2006	La Clusaz, France	4 × 5 km Relay C/F	World Cup	3rd	Erbenová / Rajdlová / Janečková

Note: ^{1} Until the 1999 World Championships, World Championship races were included in the World Cup scoring system.

== Personal life ==
On 2 July 2003, Neumannová gave birth to a daughter, Lucie Neumannová.

== See also ==
- List of athletes with the most appearances at Olympic Games

Awards
Preceded by Jaromír Jágr	Czech Athlete of the Year; 2006	Succeeded by Martina Sáblíková
