= Kamila Rajdlová =

Czech cross-country skier (born 1978)

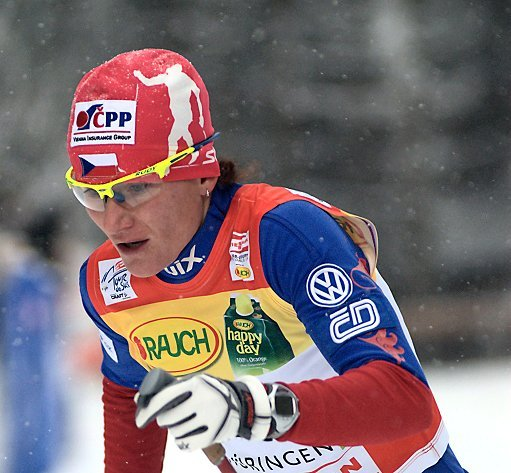
- Kamila Rajdlová in 2010

Personal information
- Nationality: Czech Republic
- Born: 22 April 1978 (age 48) Liberec, Czechoslovakia

Sport
- Sport: Skiing
- Club: Dukla Liberec

World Cup career
- Seasons: 12 – (1996, 1999–2007, 2009–2010)
- Indiv. starts: 106
- Indiv. podiums: 0
- Team starts: 15
- Team podiums: 1
- Team wins: 0
- Overall titles: 0 – (32nd in 2009)
- Discipline titles: 0

Kamila Rajdlová (born 22 April 1978 in Liberec) is a Czech cross-country skier who has competed since 1996. Her best finish at the FIS Nordic World Ski Championships was sixth in the 4 × 5 km relay at Oberstdorf in 2005 while her best individual finish was 11th in the 30 km event at Sapporo in 2007.

Rajdlová's best finish at the Winter Olympics was 23rd in the 7.5 km + 7.5 km double pursuit event at Vancouver in 2010.

Her best individual World Cup finish was 10th in a 10 km event in Estonia in 2007.

== Cross-country skiing results ==
All results are sourced from the International Ski Federation (FIS).

=== Olympic Games ===
Year	Age	10 km	15 km	Pursuit	30 km	Sprint	4 × 5 km relay	Team sprint
2002	23	26	—	45	27	—	4	—N/a
2006	27	32	—N/a	—	31	—	6	12
2010	31	25	—N/a	23	DNS	—	12	—

=== World Championships ===
Year	Age	5 km	10 km	15 km	Pursuit	30 km	Sprint	4 × 5 km relay	Team sprint
1999	20	52	—N/a	—	51	44	—N/a	—	—N/a
2001	22	—N/a	20	22	29	CNX^{[a]}	—	8	—N/a
2003	24	—N/a	31	30	—	20	—	8	—N/a
2005	26	—N/a	—	—N/a	40	24	—	6	—
2007	28	—N/a	—	—N/a	22	11	—	5	—
2009	30	—N/a	25	—N/a	20	—	—	12	9

a. ^{1} Cancelled due to extremely cold weather.

=== World Cup ===
==== Season standings ====
Season	Age	Discipline standings					Ski Tour standings	
Season	Age	Overall	Distance	Long Distance	Middle Distance	Sprint	Tour de Ski	World Cup Final
1996	17	NC	—N/a	—N/a	—N/a	—N/a	—N/a	—N/a
1999	20	NC	—N/a	NC	—N/a	NC	—N/a	—N/a
2000	21	83	—N/a	58	57	NC	—N/a	—N/a
2001	22	61	—N/a	—N/a	—N/a	NC	—N/a	—N/a
2002	23	80	—N/a	—N/a	—N/a	NC	—N/a	—N/a
2003	24	80	—N/a	—N/a	—N/a	NC	—N/a	—N/a
2004	25	70	51	—N/a	—N/a	NC	—N/a	—N/a
2005	26	73	47	—N/a	—N/a	NC	—N/a	—N/a
2006	27	68	52	—N/a	—N/a	—	—N/a	—N/a
2007	28	34	27	—N/a	—N/a	NC	20	—N/a
2009	30	32	25	—N/a	—N/a	69	22	15
2010	31	59	46	—N/a	—N/a	NC	20	—

==== Team podiums ====
- 1 podium – (1 RL)

No.	Season	Date	Location	Race	Level	Place	Teammates
1	2006–07	17 December 2006	La Clusaz, France	4 × 5 km Relay C/F	World Cup	3rd	Erbenová / Janečková / Neumannová
