= Markéta Jeriová =

Czech luger (born 1976)

Markéta Jeriová (born June 10, 1976) is a Czech luger who competed from 1998 to 2006. Competing in two Winter Olympics, she earned her best finish of 19th in the women's singles event at Salt Lake City in 2002.

Jeriová crashed during the first run of the women's singles event at the 2006 Winter Olympics in Turin and did not finish. She walked away uninjured.

Jeriová's best finish at the FIL World Luge Championships was 20th in the women's singles event at Nagano in 2004.
