= Alice Jones (skier) =

Australian alpine skier (born 1976)

Personal information
- Nationality: Australia
- Born: 16 May 1976 (age 49)

Sport
- Sport: Alpine skier
- Event(s): Downhill, Super-G, Alpine Combined

Alice Jones (born 16 May 1976 in Timmsvale, New South Wales) is an Australian Olympic alpine skier. She competed in three events at the 2002 Winter Olympics.
