= Tomáš Holubec =

Czech biathlete (born 1976)

Personal information
- Nationality: Czech
- Born: 11 January 1976 (age 49); Jilemnice, Czechoslovakia

Sport
- Sport: Biathlon

Tomáš Holubec (born 11 January 1976) is a Czech biathlete. He competed at the 2002 Winter Olympics and the 2006 Winter Olympics.
