= Jan Kobián =

Czech bobsledder

Jan Kobián (born 28 October 1970 in Prague) is a Czech bobsledder who has competed since 1992. Competing in five Winter Olympics, he earned his best finish of eighth in the two-man event at Nagano in 1998.

Kobián's best finish at the FIBT World Championships was 11th in the four-man event at Calgary in 2005.
