= Borek Zakouřil =

Czech skier (born 1976)

Personal information
- Nationality: Czech
- Born: 11 November 1976 (age 48); Liberec, Czechoslovakia

Sport
- Sport: Alpine skiing

Borek Zakouřil (born 11 November 1976) is a Czech alpine skier. He competed at the 2002 Winter Olympics and the 2006 Winter Olympics.
