= Anna Ottosson =

Swedish alpine skier (born 1976)

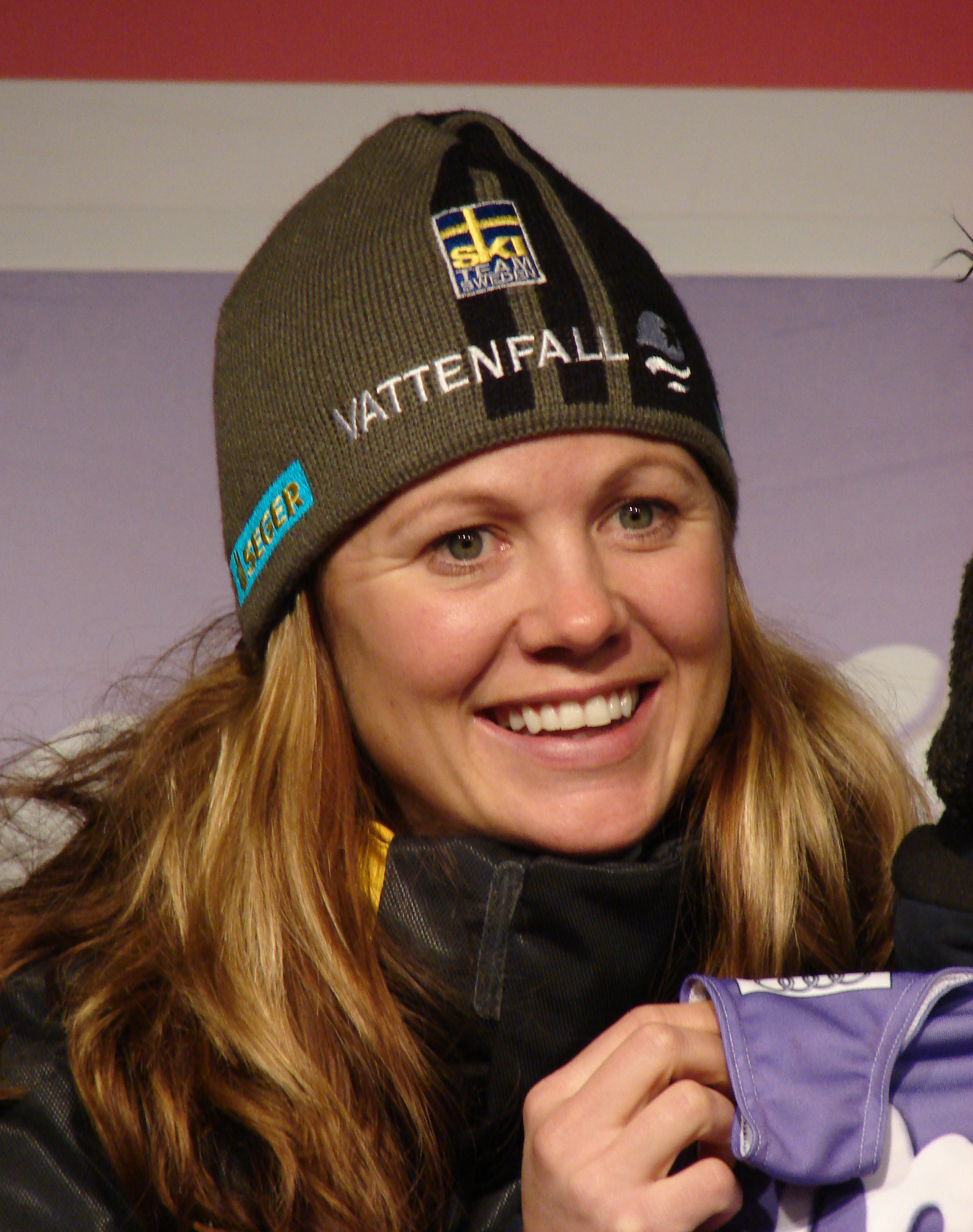
- Ottosson in December 2006

Personal information
- Full name: Anna Helene Ottosson Blixth
- Born: Anna Helene Ottosson; 18 May 1976 (age 50) Östersund, Sweden
Medal record
Women's alpine skiing
Representing Sweden
Olympic Games
Bronze medal – third place	2006 Turin	Giant slalom
World Championships
Silver medal – second place	2007 Åre	Team event

Anna Helene Ottosson Blixth (born 18 May 1976) is a Swedish former alpine skier who won an Olympic bronze medal in the giant slalom race at the 2006 Winter Olympics in Turin. She stands 1.66 meters (5 ft 5 in) tall and weighs 64 kg (141 lbs).

Her only victory in a World Cup competition came when she won a giant slalom competition in Cortina d'Ampezzo, Italy on 23 January 2000.

== World Cup competition victories ==
Date	Location	Race type
23 January 2000	Cortina d'Ampezzo, Italy	Giant slalom
