= Roman Gomola =

Czech bobsledder (born 1973)

Roman Gomola (born 8 December 1973) is a Czech bobsledder who has competed since 1995. His best Bobsleigh World Cup finish was third in the two-man event at Cortina d'Ampezzo in January 2007.

Gomola also finished 14th in the four-man and 16th in the two-man events at the 2006 Winter Olympics in Turin.

His best finish at the FIBT World Championships was ninth in the two-man event at St. Moritz in 2007.
