= Nadezhda Vasileva (alpine skier) =

Bulgarian alpine skier (born 1978)

Personal information
- Nationality: Bulgarian
- Born: 23 March 1978 (age 47); Sofia, Bulgaria

Sport
- Sport: Alpine skiing

Nadezhda Vasileva (born 23 March 1978) is a Bulgarian alpine skier. She competed at the 1998 Winter Olympics and the 2002 Winter Olympics.
