= Roman Dostál =

Czech biathlete (born 1970)

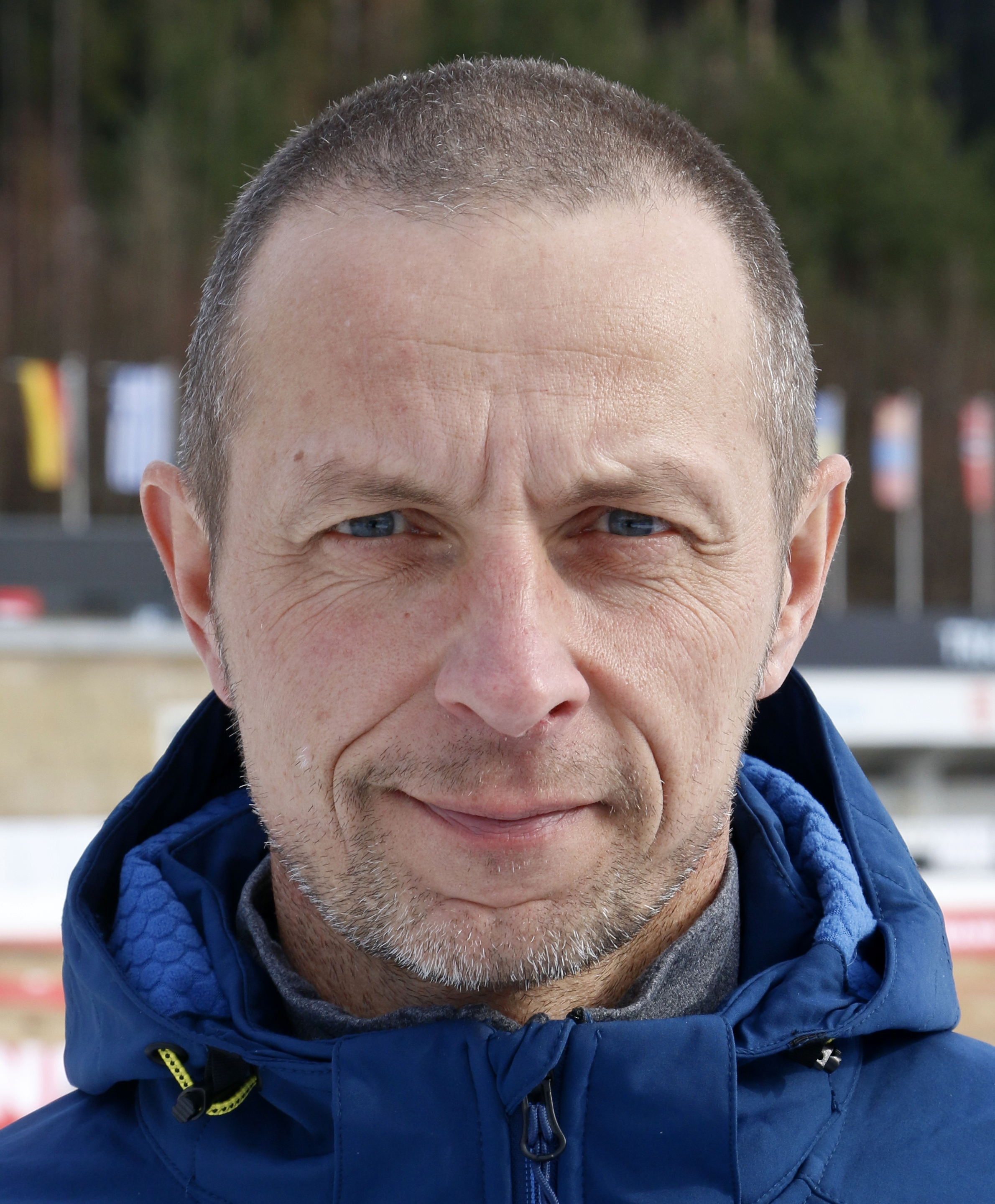

Personal information
- Full name: Roman Dostál
- Nickname: Bobek
- Born: 13 July 1970 (age 56) Ústí nad Orlicí, ČSR, Czechoslovakia
- Height: 1.78 m (5 ft 10 in)

Sport

Professional information
- Sport: Biathlon
- Club: SKP Jablonex

Olympic Games
- Teams: 3 (2002, 2006, 2010)
- Medals: 0

World Championships
- Teams: 15 (1991, 1992, 1995, 1996, 1997, 1999, 2000, 2001, 2003, 2004, 2005, 2006, 2007, 2008, 2009)
- Medals: 2 (1 gold)

World Cup
- Seasons: 20 (1990/91–2009/10)
- Individual victories: 1
- Individual podiums: 2
Medal record
Men's biathlon
Representing Czech Republic
World Championships
Gold medal – first place	2005 Hochfilzen	20 km individual
Silver medal – second place	1995 Antholz-Anterselva	Team event

Roman Dostál (pronounced [ˈroman ˈdostaːl]; born 13 July 1970) is a former Czech biathlete. He became a Biathlon World Champion on the 20 km in 2005. The victory itself was very surprising because he has never managed to come among the top three in any World Cup competition. Dostál retired after the 2009–10 season.

== Biathlon results ==
All results are sourced from the International Biathlon Union.

=== Olympic Games ===
Event	Individual	Sprint	Pursuit	Mass start	Relay
(United States) 2002 Salt Lake City	36th	34th	44th	—N/a	5th
(Italy) 2006 Turin	30th	42nd	29th	23rd	6th
(Canada) 2010 Vancouver	35th	—	—	—	7th

*Mass start was added as an event in 2006.

=== World Championships ===
2 medals (1 gold, 1 silver)

Event	Individual	Sprint	Pursuit	Mass start	Team	Relay	Mixed relay
(Finland) 1991 Lahti	32nd	45th	—N/a	—N/a	—	—	—N/a
(Russia) 1992 Novosibirsk	—N/a	—N/a	—N/a	—N/a	11th	—N/a	—N/a
(Italy) 1995 Antholz-Anterselva	—	64th	—N/a	—N/a	Silver	—	—N/a
(Germany) 1996 Ruhpolding	27th	22nd	—N/a	—N/a	7th	12th	—N/a
(Slovakia) 1997 Brezno-Osrblie	71st	72nd	—	—N/a	9th	—	—N/a
(Finland) 1999 Kontiolahti	DNS	—	—	—	—N/a	15th	—N/a
(Norway) 2000 Oslo Holmenkollen	57th	74th	—	—	—N/a	7th	—N/a
(Slovenia) 2001 Pokljuka	—	48th	45th	—	—N/a	14th	—N/a
(Russia) 2003 Khanty-Mansiysk	24th	13th	23rd	5th	—N/a	6th	—N/a
(Germany) 2004 Oberhof	13th	38th	20th	13th	—N/a	8th	—N/a
(Austria) 2005 Hochfilzen	Gold	28th	15th	12th	—N/a	11th	4th
(Slovenia) 2006 Pokljuka	—N/a	—N/a	—N/a	—N/a	—N/a	—N/a	17th
(Italy) 2007 Antholz-Anterselva	—	50th	40th	—	—N/a	5th	—
(Sweden) 2008 Östersund	53rd	36th	33rd	—	—N/a	—	—
(South Korea) 2009 Pyeongchang	15th	—	—	—	—N/a	10th	17th

*During Olympic seasons competitions are only held for those events not included in the Olympic program.
**Team was removed as an event in 1998, and pursuit was added in 1997 with mass start being added in 1999 and the mixed relay in 2005.

=== Individual victories ===
1 victory (1 In)

Season	Date	Location	Discipline	Level
2004–05; 1 victory (1 In)	9 March 2005	(Austria) Hochfilzen	20 km individual	Biathlon World Championships

*Results are from UIPMB and IBU races which include the Biathlon World Cup, Biathlon World Championships and the Winter Olympic Games.
