= Gabriela Martinovová =

Czech skier (born 1981)

Personal information
- Nationality: Czech
- Born: 14 November 1981 (age 43); Dvůr Králové nad Labem, Czechoslovakia

Sport
- Sport: Alpine skiing

Gabriela Martinovová (born 14 November 1981) is a Czech alpine skier. She competed in three events at the 2002 Winter Olympics.
