= Christina Lustenberger =

Canadian alpine skier (born 1984)

Christina Lustenberger (born August 14, 1984 in British Columbia) is a Canadian alpine skier and heli-ski guide certified by the Association of Canadian Mountain Guides. She later specialised as a professional skier, sponsored for expeditions such as extreme mountain descents, and achieving first descents of difficult routes.

Lustenberger in her racing career had one top-ten finish on the Alpine skiing World Cup circuit, a 10th place in a giant slalom at Ofterschwang in 2006. Lustenberger has also won several giant slalom at the Nor-Am Cup level, and finished 3rd overall in the GS standings in 2006.

Lustenberger competed in the giant slalom at the 2006 Olympics in Turin. She failed to finish the first run.
