= Jeannette Korten =

Australian alpine skier (born 1976)

Personal information
- Nationality: Australia
- Born: 31 January 1976 (age 50) Geneva, Switzerland

Sport
- Sport: Alpine skiing
- Event(s): Slalom, Giant slalom

Jeannette Korten (born 31 January 1976) is an Australian alpine skier. She competed in two events at the 2002 Winter Olympics.
