= Elena Tagliabue =

Italian alpine skier (born 1977)

Elena Tagliabue (born 12 December 1977) is an Italian former alpine skier who competed in the 2002 Winter Olympics.
