= Yuliya Siparenko =

Ukrainian alpine skier (born 1980)

Personal information
- Nationality: Ukrainian
- Born: 22 April 1980 (age 44); Kyiv, Soviet Union

Sport
- Sport: Alpine skiing

Yuliya Siparenko (born 22 April 1980) is a Ukrainian alpine skier. She competed at the 2002 Winter Olympics and the 2006 Winter Olympics.
