= Janette Hargin =

Swedish alpine skier

Personal information
- Born: 4 October 1977 (age 48) Stockholm, Sweden

Skiing career
- Sport: Alpine skiing

Janette Hargin (born 4 October 1977) is a Swedish former alpine skier who competed in the 2002 and 2006 Winter Olympics. During her alpine skiing career she won six Swedish national titles and scored six top ten finishes in alpine skiing World Cup races, including a career best of second in a combined in Åre in 2002. At the 2002 Winter Olympics she finished 25th in the downhill, 27th in the super-G and 31st in the giant slalom, whilst in 2006 she finished 12th in the combined, 17th in the downhill and 22nd in the super-G. Her best result in an Alpine Skiing World Championships was a 12th in the super-G in 2003.

After nine years on the alpine World Cup circuit, in 2007 Hargin retired from alpine skiing and switched to freeskiing. She has enjoyed success as a freeskier, becoming Freeride World Tour champion in 2011 and winning three Scandinavian and two Swedish titles in big mountain skiing. She retired from competitive freeskiing in 2012. She has commentated on alpine skiing for the Swedish television channel TV4.

She is the sister of Mattias Hargin, a fellow alpine skier. Janette and Mattias' sister Christine has competed alongside Janette in freeskiing and has also enjoyed success, succeeding Janette as Freeride World Tour champion in 2012.
