= Dagný Linda Kristjánsdóttir =

Icelandic alpine skier (born 1980)

Personal information
- Nationality: Icelandic
- Born: 8 November 1980 (age 46) Akureyri, Iceland

Sport
- Sport: Alpine skiing

Dagný Linda Kristjánsdóttir (born 8 November 1980) is an Icelandic alpine skier. She competed at the 2002 Winter Olympics and the 2006 Winter Olympics.
