= Petra Zakouřilová =

Czech alpine skier (born 1978)

Petra Zakouřilová (born 5 September 1978 in Liberec) is an alpine skier from the Czech Republic. She competed for the Czech Republic at the 2002, 2006 and 2010 Winter Olympics. Her best result in the Olympics was a 16th place in the 2002 combined.
