= Alexandra Munteanu =

Romanian alpine skier (born 1980)

Personal information
- Nationality: Romanian
- Born: 31 January 1980 (age 46) Brașov, Romania

Sport
- Sport: Alpine skiing

Alexandra Munteanu (born 31 January 1980) is a Romanian alpine skier. She competed in four events at the 2002 Winter Olympics.
