= Eva Kurfürstová =

Czech alpine skier (born 1977)

Eva Kurfürstová (born August 30, 1977, in Karviná, Czechoslovakia (now Czech Republic)) is a Czech alpine skier, a specialist of Slalom and Giant Slalom. Kurfürstová has appeared in two Winter Olympics (2002 and 2006), and at every World Championship since 1996.

== Career ==
=== Olympic Games ===
- Giant Slalom - 23rd
- Slalom - 21st
- Slalom - 28th

=== World Championship finishes ===
- 1997 - Ladies Slalom, 32nd position
- 1999 - Ladies Giant Slalom, 28th position
- 2001 - Ladies Slalom, 18th position
- 2003 - Ladies Slalom, 28th position

=== World Cup ===
She made her World Cup debut in the end of year 1995 in Haus im Ennstal, and since this date her best result in 20th, on 9 December 2007 in Aspen.
