= Noriyo Hiroi =

Japanese alpine skier (born 1976)

Noriyo Hiroi (廣井 法代, Hiroi Noriyo) (born 1976) is a Japanese alpine skier.

Hiroi made her World Cup debut in the 1996–97 season, in Sölden where she was disqualified. After being disqualified or not finishing in twelve consecutive races, she finally collected her first World Cup points later that same season, finishing 25th in the slalom race in Laax. In the 1997–98 and 1998–99 World Cup she did not finish either of the eleven races she started in; and in 1999–2000 she failed to finish ten more races, but did finish three, slightly improving her career best placement to 23rd in the December 1999 slalom in Lienz. The 30th place in giant slalom in March 2000 was her only World Cup point in this discipline, starting 32 giant slalom races in the World Cup throughout her career.

During the 2000–01 World Cup, Hiroi achieved another 23rd place before improving steadily to 17th in Sestriere and 10th in Semmering, both in the slalom in December 2000. In 2001 she also recorded a 16th, 12th and 14th place in Ofterschwang, Garmisch-Partenkirchen and Åre. In 2001–02 her best World Cup placement was 19th, and in 2003–04 it was 22nd. In 2004–05 she only finished one race, a 27th place, whereas her best placement in the 2005–06 World Cup was 18th. Her last World Cup race was in March 2006 in Levi, Finland.

She competed at the 1998 Winter Olympics in Nagano, and also at the 2002 and 2006 Winter Olympics. Her best outing was the 14th place in slalom at the 2002 Olympics.

She competed at the 1997, 2001, 2003 and 2005 World Alpine Skiing Championships. Her best placement here was the 26th place in St. Anton in 2001, in the giant slalom.

She took up residence in Niigata and represented the clubs Kandatsu Kogen and Albirex Niigata during her career.
