= Lucie Hrstková-Pešánová =

Czech alpine skier (born 1981)

Personal information
- Born: 16 July 1981 (age 45) Valašské Meziříčí, Czechoslovakia
- Height: 171 cm (5 ft 7 in)

Skiing career
- Sport: Alpine skiing
- Club: Dukla Liberec
- Disciplines: Giant slalom, slalom, super-G, combined

Olympics
- Teams: 3 – (1998, 2002, 2006)
- Medals: 0 (0 gold)

World Championships
- Teams: 6 – (1999–2009)
- Medals: 0 (0 gold)

Lucie Hrstková-Pešánová (née Hrstková; born 16 July 1981) is a Czech alpine ski racer. At the Universiade in Innsbruck in 2005 she won a gold medal in the Super-G. She took part in three Olympic Games.

Her husband is Filip Pešán, Czech ice hockey coach.
