= 2003 Alpine Skiing World Cup – Women's giant slalom =

2003 Women's giant slalom World Cup
| Previous: 2002 | Next: 2004 |

Women's giant slalom World Cup 2002/2003

== Final point standings ==
In women's giant slalom World Cup 2002/03 all results count.

| Place | Name | Country | Total points | 1 (Austria) | 2 (United States) | 9 (France) | 15 (Austria) | 17 (Italy) | 22 (Italy) | 23 (Slovenia) | 28 (Sweden) | 33 (Norway) |
|---|---|---|---|---|---|---|---|---|---|---|---|---|
| 1 | Anja Pärson | Sweden | 514 | 26 | 50 | - | 13 | 80 | 100 | 100 | 100 | 45 |
| 2 | Karen Putzer | Italy | 513 | - | 29 | 100 | 100 | 50 | 60 | 45 | 29 | 100 |
| 3 | Janica Kostelić | Croatia | 343 | 24 | 60 | 45 | 80 | - | 80 | 14 | 40 | - |
| 4 | Nicole Hosp | Austria | 332 | 100 | - | 32 | 60 | - | - | 80 | - | 60 |
| 5 | Sonja Nef | Switzerland | 329 | 40 | 45 | 80 | 40 | 100 | - | 24 | - | - |
| 6 | Denise Karbon | Italy | 293 | - | - | 13 | 60 | 10 | 50 | 20 | 60 | 80 |
| 7 | Alexandra Meissnitzer | Austria | 287 | - | 80 | 60 | 32 | 40 | 22 | 16 | 13 | 24 |
| 8 | Martina Ertl | Germany | 280 | - | 24 | 22 | 20 | 18 | 36 | 60 | 50 | 50 |
| 9 | Michaela Dorfmeister | Austria | 266 | 22 | 7 | 60 | 22 | 60 | 45 | 50 | - | - |
| 10 | María José Rienda | Spain | 237 | 45 | 14 | 40 | 26 | 45 | 29 | 32 | 6 | - |
| 11 | Andrine Flemmen | Norway | 232 | 100 | - | 11 | 16 | 26 | 8 | 15 | 16 | 40 |
| 12 | Anna Ottosson | Sweden | 194 | 20 | 40 | 26 | 15 | 36 | 12 | 9 | 20 | 16 |
| 13 | Tina Maze | Slovenia | 190 | 100 | - | - | - | 8 | 24 | 36 | - | 22 |
| 14 | Tanja Poutiainen | Finland | 184 | 29 | - | 18 | 29 | 32 | - | 40 | 36 | - |
| 15 | Birgit Heeb-Batliner | Liechtenstein | 180 | - | 100 | 36 | 1 | 5 | 11 | 18 | 9 | - |
| 16 | Eveline Rohregger | Austria | 169 | 10 | 22 | 6 | 26 | 29 | 18 | 26 | - | 32 |
| 17 | Britt Janyk | Canada | 155 | - | 26 | 8 | 40 | 14 | - | 22 | 45 | - |
| 18 | Stine Hofgaard Nilsen | Norway | 153 | 50 | - | - | 6 | - | 40 | 13 | 24 | 20 |
| 19 | Allison Forsyth | Canada | 146 | - | 32 | 10 | 9 | 26 | 32 | 8 | - | 29 |
| 20 | Silvia Berger | Austria | 142 | 12 | 36 | 15 | 14 | 20 | - | 10 | 9 | 26 |
| 21 | Sarah Schleper | United States | 140 | 9 | 11 | 32 | 18 | 13 | - | 7 | 14 | 36 |
| 22 | Brigitte Obermoser | Austria | 134 | 14 | 6 | 26 | 45 | - | 14 | 11 | 18 | - |
| 23 | Geneviève Simard | Canada | 105 | 11 | 9 | 13 | 7 | 12 | 20 | 29 | 4 | - |
| 24 | Daniela Merighetti | Italy | 80 | - | - | - | - | - | - | - | 80 | - |
| 25 | Kirsten Clark | United States | 75 | 3 | 20 | 9 | 8 | 4 | - | 2 | 11 | 18 |
| 26 | Caroline Lalive | United States | 67 | - | - | 14 | 12 | 15 | 26 | - | - | - |
| 27 | Elisabeth Görgl | Austria | 66 | - | - | 20 | - | 16 | 15 | - | 15 | - |
| 28 | Nicole Gius | Italy | 63 | 15 | 11 | 5 | - | - | - | - | 32 | - |
| | Carole Montillet | France | 63 | 18 | 18 | 7 | 3 | - | - | 12 | 5 | - |
| 30 | Kristina Koznick | United States | 57 | - | 12 | 2 | 11 | - | 5 | 1 | 26 | - |
| | Fränzi Aufdenblatten | Switzerland | 57 | 16 | 13 | 16 | - | - | - | 5 | 7 | - |
| 32 | Jessica Lindell-Vikarby | Sweden | 52 | 36 | - | - | - | - | 16 | - | - | - |
| 33 | Maddalena Planatscher | Italy | 44 | - | 15 | 4 | 10 | - | - | 3 | 12 | - |
| 34 | Alenka Dovžan | Slovenia | 32 | 32 | - | - | - | - | - | - | - | - |
| | Manuela Mölgg | Italy | 32 | - | - | - | - | 22 | 10 | - | - | - |
| | Silke Bachmann | Italy | 32 | - | - | - | - | 7 | 9 | 6 | 10 | - |
| 37 | Marlies Oester | Switzerland | 29 | - | 16 | - | - | - | 13 | - | - | - |
| 38 | Laurence Lazier | France | 24 | - | - | - | - | - | - | - | 24 | - |
| 39 | Hilde Gerg | Germany | 14 | 14 | - | - | - | - | - | - | - | - |
| 40 | Christel Pascal | France | 13 | 7 | 6 | - | - | - | - | - | - | - |
| 41 | Ana Jelušić | Croatia | 12 | 8 | - | - | - | - | 4 | - | - | - |
| 42 | Maria Riesch | Germany | 11 | - | - | - | - | 11 | - | - | - | - |
| 43 | Tanja Schneider | Austria | 10 | 6 | - | - | 4 | - | - | - | - | - |
| 44 | Daniela Ceccarelli | Italy | 9 | 5 | 4 | - | - | - | - | - | - | - |
| | Lilian Kummer | Switzerland | 9 | - | - | - | - | 9 | - | - | - | - |
| 46 | Erika Dicht | Switzerland | 8 | - | 8 | - | - | - | - | - | - | - |
| 47 | Susanne Ekman | Sweden | 7 | - | - | - | - | - | 7 | - | - | - |
| 48 | Fabienne Suter | Switzerland | 6 | - | - | - | - | 6 | - | - | - | - |
| | Sonia Vierin | Italy | 6 | - | - | - | - | - | 6 | - | - | - |
| 50 | Nadia Styger | Switzerland | 5 | - | - | - | 5 | - | - | - | - | - |
| 51 | Carolina Ruiz Castillo | Spain | 4 | 4 | - | - | - | - | - | - | - | - |
| | Renate Götschl | Austria | 4 | - | - | - | - | - | - | 4 | - | - |
| 53 | Ana Galindo Santolaria | Spain | 3 | - | 3 | - | - | - | - | - | - | - |
| | Kristina Duvillard | France | 3 | - | - | 3 | - | - | - | - | - | - |
| | Jonna Mendes | United States | 3 | - | - | - | - | - | - | - | 3 | - |
| 56 | Olesya Aliyeva | Russia | 2 | 2 | - | - | - | - | - | - | - | - |
| | Špela Pretnar | Slovenia | 2 | - | 2 | - | - | - | - | - | - | - |
| | Annemarie Gerg | Germany | 2 | - | - | - | 2 | - | - | - | - | - |
| 59 | Laure Pequegnot | France | 1 | - | - | 1 | - | - | - | - | - | - |

Note:

In the last race only the best racers were allowed to compete and only the best 15 finishers were awarded with points.

Alpine Skiing World Cup
Women

Overall | Downhill | Super-G | Giant slalom | Slalom | Combined

2003
