= 2002 Alpine Skiing World Cup – Women's downhill =

2002 Women's downhill World Cup
| Previous: 2001 | Next: 2003 |

Women's downhill World Cup 2001/2002

== Final point standings ==
In women's downhill World Cup 2001/02 all results count.

| Place | Name | Country | Total points | 4 (Canada) | 5 (Canada) | 10 (Switzerland) | 17 (Austria) | 18 (Austria) | 24 (Italy) | 27 (Sweden) | 30 (Switzerland) | 31 (Austria) |
|---|---|---|---|---|---|---|---|---|---|---|---|---|
| 1 | Isolde Kostner | Italy | 568 | 100 | 100 | 80 | 60 | 40 | 80 | 60 | 26 | 22 |
| 2 | Michaela Dorfmeister | Austria | 469 | 80 | 60 | 32 | 32 | 60 | 36 | 29 | 40 | 100 |
| 3 | Corinne Rey-Bellet | Switzerland | 414 | 60 | 40 | 60 | 50 | 22 | 32 | - | 100 | 50 |
| 4 | Hilde Gerg | Germany | 412 | 29 | 36 | 45 | 100 | 100 | 26 | - | 60 | 16 |
| 5 | Renate Götschl | Austria | 408 | 26 | 26 | 40 | 36 | 80 | 100 | 100 | - | - |
| 6 | Sylviane Berthod | Switzerland | 346 | 32 | 80 | 100 | 40 | 29 | 40 | 13 | 12 | - |
| 7 | Melanie Suchet | France | 304 | - | 29 | 22 | 15 | 24 | 50 | 24 | 80 | 60 |
| 8 | Selina Heregger | Austria | 268 | - | 20 | 50 | 12 | 11 | 45 | 80 | 50 | - |
| 9 | Brigitte Obermoser | Austria | 242 | 16 | 14 | 10 | 45 | 50 | 6 | 32 | 29 | 40 |
| 10 | Pernilla Wiberg | Sweden | 208 | 36 | 18 | 24 | 80 | 50 | - | - | - | - |
| 11 | Daniela Ceccarelli | Italy | 201 | 13 | 11 | 15 | 10 | 20 | 60 | 14 | 22 | 36 |
| 12 | Ingeborg Helen Marken | Norway | 199 | 45 | 15 | 1 | 16 | 16 | 32 | 36 | 9 | 29 |
| 13 | Carole Montillet | France | 180 | 15 | 12 | 29 | 32 | 36 | 24 | - | 32 | - |
| 14 | Caroline Lalive | United States | 172 | 12 | 5 | 26 | 11 | 14 | - | - | 24 | 80 |
| 15 | Catherine Borghi | Switzerland | 159 | 50 | 9 | 13 | 14 | 5 | 18 | 50 | - | - |
| 16 | Kirsten Clark | United States | 153 | 24 | 32 | 6 | 24 | 15 | 20 | - | - | 32 |
| 17 | Picabo Street | United States | 136 | 40 | 45 | - | 26 | 13 | 12 | - | - | - |
| 18 | Tanja Schneider | Austria | 132 | 9 | 24 | 36 | 20 | - | - | 7 | 18 | 18 |
| 19 | Melanie Turgeon | Canada | 123 | - | 50 | 9 | 18 | 2 | 3 | - | 15 | 26 |
| 20 | Stefanie Schuster | Austria | 112 | 7 | - | 7 | 22 | 12 | 15 | 18 | 7 | 24 |
| 21 | Regina Häusl | Germany | 102 | - | - | 3 | 7 | 32 | 9 | 6 | 45 | - |
| 22 | Patrizia Bassis | Italy | 97 | 22 | - | 16 | 1 | 3 | - | 15 | 20 | 20 |
| 23 | Petra Haltmayr | Germany | 88 | 3 | - | - | 13 | 26 | 10 | - | 36 | - |
| 24 | Lucia Recchia | Italy | 84 | 4 | - | 18 | 8 | 18 | 14 | 11 | 11 | - |
| 25 | Ingrid Rumpfhuber | Austria | 78 | 6 | 6 | - | - | 10 | 16 | 40 | - | - |
| 26 | Mojca Suhadolc | Slovenia | 73 | 5 | - | 14 | - | 6 | 13 | 22 | 13 | - |
| 27 | Ingrid Jacquemod | France | 72 | - | - | - | 5 | 8 | 4 | 45 | 10 | - |
| 28 | Warwara Zelenskaja | Russia | 56 | 18 | - | - | - | - | 22 | 10 | 6 | - |
| 29 | Jonna Mendes | United States | 55 | 20 | - | 8 | - | - | 11 | - | 16 | - |
| 30 | Anne-Marie LeFrançois | France | 53 | 14 | 22 | - | - | - | 9 | - | 8 | - |
| 31 | Elena Tagliabue | Italy | 51 | - | - | 22 | - | - | - | 29 | - | - |
| 32 | Astrid Vierthaler | Austria | 49 | 11 | 13 | - | 9 | - | - | 16 | - | - |
| 33 | Sibylle Brauner | Germany | 48 | - | 16 | 12 | - | - | - | 20 | - | - |
| | Julia Mancuso | United States | 48 | - | - | - | - | - | - | 3 | - | 45 |
| 35 | Isabelle Huber | Germany | 30 | 9 | 7 | - | - | 1 | 7 | 5 | 1 | - |
| 36 | Kathleen Monahan | United States | 23 | - | 3 | 5 | 4 | 4 | 5 | - | 2 | - |
| 37 | Špela Bračun | Slovenia | 20 | 1 | 10 | - | - | - | - | 9 | - | - |
| 38 | Karen Putzer | Italy | 19 | 10 | 8 | - | - | - | 1 | - | - | - |
| 39 | Martina Ertl | Germany | 17 | - | 1 | - | 2 | - | - | - | 14 | - |
| 40 | Janette Hargin | Sweden | 16 | - | - | 12 | - | - | - | 4 | - | - |
| 41 | Janica Kostelić | Croatia | 15 | - | - | - | 6 | 9 | - | - | - | - |
| | Lindsey Kildow | United States | 15 | - | - | - | 6 | 9 | - | - | - | - |
| 43 | Alexandra Meissnitzer | Austria | 13 | - | - | - | - | - | - | 13 | - | - |
| 44 | Barbara Kleon | Italy | 7 | - | 4 | - | 3 | - | - | - | - | - |
| 45 | Karine Meilleur | France | 5 | - | - | - | - | - | - | - | 5 | - |
| 46 | Jenny Owens | Australia | 4 | - | - | 4 | - | - | - | - | - | - |
| | Corinne Imlig | Switzerland | 4 | - | - | - | - | - | - | - | 4 | - |
| 48 | Sara-Maude Boucher | Canada | - | 3 | - | - | - | - | - | - | - | - |
| | Tamara Müller | Switzerland | 3 | - | - | - | - | - | 2 | 1 | - | - |
| | Katja Wirth | Austria | 3 | - | - | - | - | - | - | - | 3 | - |
| 51 | Ella Alpiger | Switzerland | 2 | 2 | - | - | - | - | - | - | - | - |
| | Martina Schild | Switzerland | 2 | - | - | 2 | - | - | - | - | - | - |
| | Christine Sponring | Austria | 2 | - | - | - | - | - | - | 2 | - | - |

Alpine skiing World Cup
Women

Overall | Downhill | Super-G | Giant slalom | Slalom | Combined

2002
