= 2002 Alpine Skiing World Cup – Women's giant slalom =

2002 Women's giant slalom World Cup
Previous: 2001	Next: 2003

Women's giant slalom World Cup 2001/2002

== Final point standings ==
In women's giant slalom World Cup 2001/02 all results count.

Place	Name	Country	Total points	1 (Austria)	2 (United States)	9 (France)	12 (Austria)	14 (Slovenia)	21 (Germany)	25 (Italy)	26 (Sweden)	33 (Austria)
1	Sonja Nef	Switzerland	574	80	60	100	-	100	50	24	60	100
2	Michaela Dorfmeister	Austria	494	100	36	60	-	8	100	50	100	40
3	Anja Pärson	Sweden	360	7	22	80	60	40	20	15	80	36
4	Andrine Flemmen	Norway	335	11	100	50	15	50	29	80	-	-
5	Stina Hofgard Nilsen	Norway	330	-	45	-	45	60	80	100	-	-
6	Karen Putzer	Italy	324	14	50	29	80	16	5	60	20	50
7	Allison Forsyth	Canada	303	50	80	45	-	24	36	26	22	20
8	Tina Maze	Slovenia	224	20	14	36	-	80	24	32	18	-
9	Ylva Nowén	Sweden	223	32	3	-	60	45	12	11	15	45
10	Anna Ottosson	Sweden	219	26	9	24	26	13	6	22	13	80
	Tanja Poutiainen	Finland	219	12	13	40	-	22	36	-	36	60
12	Alexandra Meissnitzer	Austria	194	-	26	26	-	5	16	45	50	26
13	Birgit Heeb-Batliner	Liechtenstein	185	24	8	8	40	-	9	40	24	32
14	Lilian Kummer	Switzerland	177	-	2	5	100	-	14	-	32	24
15	María José Rienda Contreras	Spain	142	45	20	36	-	32	-	-	9	-
16	Carole Montillet	France	134	22	40	-	29	29	10	4	-	-
17	Silke Bachmann	Italy	119	36	4	-	-	13	22	14	12	18
18	Corinne Rey-Bellet	Switzerland	117	-	-	2	10	36	45	9	15	-
	Eveline Rohregger	Austria	117	18	-	9	20	9	3	36	-	22
20	Sarah Schleper	United States	114	3	1	22	13	26	15	18	-	16
21	Fränzi Aufdenblatten	Switzerland	109	10	7	-	7	-	40	-	45	-
22	Kristina Koznick	United States	94	16	-	12	3	-	18	16	29	-
23	Geneviève Simard	Canada	88	-	16	-	-	-	60	12	-	-
	Brigitte Obermoser	Austria	88	29	24	1	1	-	7	-	26	-
25	Alenka Dovžan	Slovenia	87	13	18	18	18	10	-	10	-	-
	Janica Kostelić	Croatia	87	-	-	-	9	-	26	20	-	32
27	Selina Heregger	Austria	86	40	-	-	-	4	2	-	40	-
28	Silvia Berger	Austria	74	-	11	3	32	7	13	5	3	-
29	Maddalena Planatscher	Italy	61	9	10	14	11	-	11	-	6	-
30	Régine Cavagnoud	France	60	60	-	-	-	-	-	-	-	-
31	Denise Karbon	Italy	49	-	-	20	-	-	-	29	-	-
32	Kirsten Clark	United States	47	-	29	-	14	-	4	-	-	-
33	Nicole Gius	Italy	43	-	-	-	22	16	-	-	5	-
34	Tanja Schneider	Austria	41	-	5	-	36	-	-	-	-	-
35	Christel Pascal-Saioni	France	38	5	-	4	16	6	-	-	7	-
36	Renate Götschl	Austria	37	8	-	-	2	14	-	13	-	-
37	Sonia Vierin	Italy	36	-	-	16	-	20	-	-	-	-
38	Isolde Kostner	Italy	35	15	13	7	-	-	-	-	-	-
39	Janette Hargin	Sweden	34	-	-	10	24	-	-	-	-	-
40	Caroline Pellat-Finet	France	32	-	32	-	-	-	-	-	-	-
41	Hilde Gerg	Germany	30	-	-	-	-	20	-	6	4	-
42	Britt Janyk	Canada	24	-	-	-	-	-	-	8	16	-
43	Špela Pretnar	Slovenia	21	-	-	16	5	-	-	-	-	-
44	Petra Haltmayr	Germany	19	2	-	-	-	-	-	7	10	-
45	Marlies Oester	Switzerland	17	-	-	13	4	-	-	-	-	-
	Martina Ertl	Germany	17	6	-	-	8	3	-	-	-	-
47	Mélanie Suchet	France	15	-	15	-	-	-	-	-	-	-
48	Ana Galindo Santolaria	Spain	14	-	-	-	12	-	-	-	2	-
49	Christine Sponring	Austria	12	-	-	-	-	-	-	-	12	-
50	Fujiko Sekino	Japan	11	-	-	11	-	-	-	-	-	-
	Maria Riesch	Germany	11	-	-	-	-	11	-	-	-	-
52	Lucie Hrstková	Czech Republic	8	-	-	-	-	-	8	-	-	-
	Stefanie Schuster	Austria	8	-	-	-	-	-	-	-	8	-
54	Anna Prchal	Canada	7	-	-	7	-	-	-	-	-	-
55	Annemarie Gerg	Germany	6	-	6	-	-	-	-	-	-	-
	Barbara Kleon	Italy	6	-	-	-	6	-	-	-	-	-
57	Pernilla Wiberg	Sweden	4	4	-	-	-	-	-	-	-	-
58	Nicole Hosp	Austria	2	-	-	-	-	2	-	-	-	-

Alpine skiing World Cup
Women

Overall | Downhill | Super-G | Giant slalom | Slalom | Combined

2002
