= 2003 Alpine Skiing World Cup – Women's downhill =

2003 Women's downhill World Cup
Previous: 2002	Next: 2004

Women's downhill World Cup 2002/2003

== Final point standings ==
In women's downhill World Cup 2002/03 all results count.

Place	Name	Country	Total points	6 (Canada)	7 (Canada)	12 (Switzerland)	21 (Italy)	26 (Austria)	30 (Norway)
1	Michaela Dorfmeister	Austria	372	22	50	100	60	100	40
2	Renate Götschl	Austria	368	36	60	22	100	50	100
3	Kirsten Clark	United States	316	60	45	60	80	11	60
4	Carole Montillet	France	313	80	100	15	50	36	32
5	Corinne Rey-Bellet	Switzerland	230	40	80	13	16	45	36
6	Hilde Gerg	Germany	196	100	-	-	36	60	-
7	Ingrid Jacquemod	France	153	20	32	2	18	1	80
8	Mélanie Turgeon	Canada	149	-	18	40	26	20	45
9	Karen Putzer	Italy	143	16	22	26	40	15	24
10	Alexandra Meissnitzer	Austria	139	45	16	4	22	26	26
11	Janica Kostelić	Croatia	136	13	29	40	32	22	-
12	Brigitte Obermoser	Austria	130	-	-	80	10	18	22
13	Daniela Ceccarelli	Italy	116	-	-	32	16	18	50
14	Maria Riesch	Germany	115	-	24	16	14	32	29
15	Catherine Borghi	Switzerland	114	11	13	45	-	29	16
16	Jonna Mendes	United States	113	29	12	14	45	13	-
17	Sylviane Berthod	Switzerland	112	12	40	24	24	12	-
18	Caroline Lalive	Canada	90	50	-	11	22	7	-
19	Isolde Kostner	Italy	89	-	-	-	29	40	20
20	Katja Wirth	Austria	81	-	1	-	-	80	-
21	Regina Häusl	Germany	78	14	22	32	10	-	-
22	Isabelle Huber	Germany	73	18	15	10	3	9	18
23	Martina Ertl	Germany	67	32	14	6	11	4	-
24	Mojca Suhadolc	Slovenia	60	26	26	-	8	-	-
25	Jessica Lindell-Vikarby	Sweden	56	-	-	50	6	-	-
26	Kathrin Wilhelm	Austria	55	26	8	7	-	14	-
27	Julia Mancuso	United States	44	10	10	-	-	24	-
28	Tamara Müller	Switzerland	41	5	36	-	-	-	-
29	Corinne Imlig	Switzerland	35	7	-	18	-	10	-
30	Karine Meilleur	France	22	15	7	-	-	-	-
31	Martina Schild	Switzerland	20	-	-	20	-	-	-
	Nadia Styger	Switzerland	20	-	3	5	12	-	-
33	Janette Hargin	Sweden	19	-	-	8	5	6	-
34	Mélanie Suchet	Switzerland	18	-	-	-	13	5	-
35	Libby Ludlow	United States	16	4	5	-	7	-	-
36	Kathleen Monahan	United States	14	3	11	-	-	-	-
	Lucia Recchia	Italy	14	2	-	12	-	-	-
38	Monika Dummermuth	Switzerland	12	1	-	10	1	-	-
39	Karin Blaser	Austria	11	9	2	-	-	-	-
	Selina Heregger	Austria	11	-	9	-	-	2	-
41	Patrizia Bassis	Italy	9	9	-	-	-	-	-
42	Alison Powers	United States	8	-	-	-	-	8	-
43	Bryna McCarty	United States	6	6	-	-	-	-	-
	Ingrid Rumpfhuber	Austria	6	-	6	-	-	-	-
45	Špela Bračun	Slovenia	4	-	4	-	-	-	-
	Emily Brydon	Canada	4	-	-	-	4	-	-
47	Tanja Schneider	Austria	3	-	-	3	-	-	-
	Lindsey Kildow	United States	3	-	-	-	-	3	-
49	Petra Haltmayr	Germany	2	-	-	-	2	-	-
50	Ella Alpiger	Switzerland	1	-	-	1	-	-	-

Note:

In the last race only the best racers were allowed to compete and only the best 15 finishers were awarded with points.

Alpine skiing World Cup
Women

Overall | Downhill | Super-G | Giant slalom | Slalom | Combined

2003
