= 2003 Alpine Skiing World Cup – Women's super-G =

2003 Women's Super G World Cup
Previous: 2002	Next: 2004

Women's super-G World Cup 2002/2003

== Final point standings ==
In women's super-G World Cup 2002/03 all results count.

Place	Name	Country	Total points	4 (United States)	8 (Canada)	10 (France)	19 (Italy)	20 (Italy)	25 (Austria)	27 (Austria)	31 (Norway)
1	Carole Montillet	France	493	18	60	100	100	29	80	80	26
2	Renate Götschl	Austria	458	-	18	50	80	100	100	60	50
3	Karen Putzer	Italy	394	40	100	36	26	50	16	26	100
4	Alexandra Meissnitzer	Austria	350	-	3	32	45	80	60	50	80
5	Michaela Dorfmeister	Austria	298	36	45	60	22	-	50	40	45
6	Daniela Ceccarelli	Italy	289	24	26	80	24	36	29	50	20
7	Hilde Gerg	Germany	281	100	-	-	60	40	45	36	-
	Janica Kostelić	Croatia	281	80	36	28	36	45	16	32	18
9	Martina Ertl	Germany	267	32	80	14	13	10	24	14	80
10	Kirsten Clark	United States	252	50	50	40	18	18	11	29	36
11	Brigitte Obermoser	Austria	213	7	13	-	-	13	40	100	40
12	Corinne Rey-Bellet	Switzerland	206	45	20	16	20	24	36	16	29
13	Jonna Mendes	United States	191	26	29	10	16	32	32	22	24
14	Mélanie Turgeon	Canada	163	13	16	8	40	60	26	-	-
15	Caroline Lalive	United States	136	29	13	26	32	26	10	-	-
16	Mojca Suhadolc	Slovenia	109	22	5	29	29	24	-	-	-
17	Isolde Kostner	Italy	106	60	-	-	6	-	22	18	-
18	Eveline Rohregger	Austria	98	15	10	-	8	-	22	11	32
19	Ingrid Jacquemod	France	83	16	14	22	9	-	-	-	22
20	Emily Brydon	Canada	77	-	32	-	-	11	14	20	-
21	Sylviane Berthod	Switzerland	73	20	24	6	-	-	-	7	16
22	Geneviève Simard	Canada	70	-	40	15	7	-	8	-	-
23	Tamara Müller	Switzerland	63	5	8	-	50	-	-	-	-
24	Fränzi Aufdenblatten	Switzerland	59	-	-	45	-	-	1	13	-
25	Julia Mancuso	United States	53	14	11	-	14	14	-	-	-
26	Katja Wirth	Austria	52	-	-	5	12	7	18	10	-
27	Silvia Berger	Austria	49	13	-	12	5	-	10	9	-
28	Libby Ludlow	United States	48	2	-	13	11	2	5	15	-
29	Lucia Recchia	Italy	44	-	22	11	11	-	-	-	-
	Tanja Schneider	Austria	44	11	-	2	15	-	13	3	-
31	Mélanie Suchet	France	36	-	-	-	-	-	12	24	-
32	Regina Häusl	Germany	35	10	-	20	-	-	-	5	-
33	Anna Ottosson	Sweden	32	-	-	9	2	15	6	-	-
34	Anja Pärson	Sweden	30	8	-	-	-	5	8	9	-
35	Catherine Borghi	Switzerland	25	-	6	1	4	12	-	2	-
36	Kathleen Monahan	United States	25	-	1	24	-	-	-	-	-
37	Maria Riesch	Germany	24	-	-	-	-	24	-	-	-
	Monika Dummermuth	Switzerland	24	9	-	7	-	8	-	-	-
39	Selina Heregger	Austria	22	3	-	-	-	16	3	-	-
40	Patrizia Bassis	Italy	21	6	15	-	-	-	-	-	-
41	Isabelle Huber	Germany	16	-	10	-	-	6	-	-	-
42	Nadia Styger	Switzerland	15	-	5	-	-	-	4	6	-
43	Barbara Kleon	Italy	13	-	-	-	-	-	-	13	-
44	Martina Lechner	Austria	9	-	-	-	-	9	-	-	-
45	Karine Meilleur	France	7	-	7	-	-	-	-	-	-
	Tanja Pieren	Switzerland	7	-	-	4	2	1	-	-	-
47	Carolina Ruiz Castillo	Spain	6	-	-	-	3	3	-	-	-
	Kathrin Wilhelm	Austria	6	5	-	-	-	-	-	1	-
49	Chiara Maj	Switzerland	5	-	-	-	-	5	-	-	-
50	Chemmy Alcott	United Kingdom	4	-	-	-	-	-	-	4	-
51	Elena Tagliabue	Italy	3	-	3	-	-	-	-	-	-
	Anne-Laure Givelet	France	3	-	-	3	-	-	-	-	-
53	Jessica Lindell-Vikarby	Sweden	2	-	-	-	-	-	2	-	-
54	Manuela Mölgg	Italy	1	1	-	-	-	-	-	-	-

Note:

In the last race only the best racers were allowed to compete and only the best 15 finishers were awarded with points.

Alpine skiing World Cup
Women

Overall | Downhill | Super G | Giant slalom | Slalom | Combined

2003
