= 2002 Alpine Skiing World Cup – Women's slalom =

2002 Women's slalom World Cup
Previous: 2001	Next: 2003

Women's slalom World Cup 2001/2002

== Final point standings ==
In women's slalom World Cup 2001/02 all results count.

Place	Name	Country	Total points	3 (United States)	7 (Italy)	13 (Austria)	15 (Slovenia)	16 (Slovenia)	19 (Austria)	22 (Germany)	28 (Sweden)	34 (Austria)
1	Laure Pequegnot	France	597	100	36	36	60	80	100	40	100	45
2	Kristina Koznick	United States	518	40	32	80	80	36	50	100	80	20
3	Anja Pärson	Sweden	480	-	100	100	100	100	-	-	-	80
4	Sonja Nef	Switzerland	330	-	60	29	32	60	80	24	45	-
5	Ylva Nowén	Sweden	328	26	-	50	22	18	60	32	60	60
6	Christel Pascal-Saioni	France	312	50	22	32	40	50	32	50	-	36
7	Tanja Poutiainen	Finland	301	-	80	26	50	29	-	16	50	50
8	Monika Bergmann	Germany	264	40	-	80	16	40	26	22	18	22
9	Marlies Oester	Switzerland	261	22	29	14	45	22	29	100	-	-
10	Sarah Schleper	United States	254	-	11	40	36	45	45	45	32	-
11	Janica Kostelić	Croatia	252	-	-	24	29	26	13	60	-	100
12	Trine Bakke-Rognmo	Norway	177	-	50	45	14	24	18	26	-	-
13	Vanessa Vidal	France	164	20	13	8	20	16	40	29	-	18
14	Martina Ertl	Germany	157	32	40	15	-	15	-	8	15	32
15	Carina Raich	Austria	154	60	18	-	-	14	1	-	11	40
16	Marlies Schild	Austria	134	-	6	-	8	20	24	12	40	24
17	Corina Grünenfelder	Switzerland	128	-	18	20	26	32	16	-	16	-
18	Špela Pretnar	Slovenia	126	-	45	12	-	13	-	20	36	-
19	Christine Sponring	Austria	119	80	-	-	-	10	-	-	-	29
20	Henna Raita	Finland	112	11	8	-	-	12	40	15	-	26
21	Sabine Egger	Austria	111	16	-	-	10	4	-	36	29	16
22	Hedda Berntsen	Norway	107	45	-	7	-	-	20	11	24	-
23	Veronika Zuzulová	Slovakia	89	14	24	11	-	7	-	7	26	-
24	Elisabetta Biavaschi	Italy	82	-	20	16	24	-	22	-	-	-
25	Renate Götschl	Austria	76	29	4	-	-	-	5	14	24	-
26	Annemarie Gerg	Germany	62	18	12	10	-	-	-	18	4	-
27	Alenka Dovžan	Slovenia	60	9	-	22	11	9	-	9	-	-
28	Nataša Bokal	Slovenia	58	6	29	10	5	-	8	-	-	-
29	Zali Steggall	Australia	47	10	-	13	-	2	9	-	13	-
30	Susanne Ekman	Sweden	44	-	15	-	-	8	14	-	7	-
31	Lea Dabič	Slovenia	41	-	-	-	18	-	10	13	-	-
32	Anna Ottosson	Sweden	35	-	10	-	-	5	-	-	20	-
33	Michaela Kirchgasser	Austria	32	-	14	18	-	-	-	-	-	-
34	Noriyo Hiroi	Japan	31	-	-	-	7	1	12	5	6	-
35	Allison Forsyth	Canada	30	7	-	-	-	6	-	6	11	-
36	Janette Hargin	Sweden	27	-	-	-	15	-	-	-	12	-
37	Karin Köllerer	Austria	26	26	-	-	-	-	-	-	-	-
38	María José Rienda Contreras	Spain	24	15	9	-	-	-	-	-	-	-
	Claudia Riegler	New Zealand	24	-	-	-	-	-	15	-	9	-
40	Nicole Gius	Italy	23	-	-	-	12	11	-	-	-	-
41	Britt Janyk	Canada	14	-	-	-	-	-	-	-	14	-
42	Denise Karbon	Italy	13	13	-	-	-	-	-	-	-	-
	Geneviève Simard	Canada	13	-	-	-	13	-	-	-	-	-
44	Christine Hargin	Sweden	12	12	-	-	-	-	-	-	-	-
	Tina Maze	Slovenia	12	-	-	-	6	-	6	-	-	-
46	Karin Truppe	Austria	10	-	-	-	-	3	7	-	-	-
	Maria Riesch	Germany	10	-	-	-	-	-	-	10	-	-
48	Line Viken	Norway	9	-	-	-	9	-	-	-	-	-
	Marina Huber	Germany	9	-	-	-	-	-	-	4	5	-
50	Stefanie Wolf	Germany	8	8	-	-	-	-	-	-	-	-
	Maddalena Planatscher	Italy	8	-	-	-	-	-	-	-	8	-
52	Silke Bachmann	Italy	7	-	7	-	-	-	-	-	-	-
53	Petra Knor	Austria	6	-	6	-	-	-	-	-	-	-
54	Petra Zakouřilová	Czech Republic	3	-	3	-	-	-	-	-	-	-
	Emma Carrick-Anderson	United Kingdom	3	-	-	-	-	-	-	-	3	-

Alpine skiing World Cup
Women

Overall | Downhill | Super-G | Giant slalom | Slalom | Combined

2002
