= 1999–2000 FIS Alpine Ski World Cup =

International sports competition

FIS Alpine Ski World Cup 1999/2000
Discipline	Men	Women
Overall	(Austria) Hermann Maier	(Austria) Renate Götschl
Downhill	(Austria) Hermann Maier	(Germany) Regina Häusl
Super G	(Austria) Hermann Maier	(Austria) Renate Götschl
Giant slalom	(Austria) Hermann Maier	(Austria) Michaela Dorfmeister
Slalom	(Norway) Kjetil André Aamodt	(Slovenia) Špela Pretnar
Nations Cup	Austria	Austria
- Nations Cup overall: Austria

Competition
Locations	21	18
Individual	40	40

The 34th World Cup season began in October 1999 and concluded at the World Cup finals in March 2000. The overall winners were Hermann Maier (his second) and Renate Götschl (her first), both of Austria.

Maier set a new record for total points in one season, with 2000. This was not eclipsed until Tina Maze garnered 2,414 in the 2013 season.

== Calendar ==
=== Men ===
Event key: DH – Downhill, SL – Slalom, GS – Giant slalom, SG – Super giant slalom, KB – Combined
Race	Season	Date	Place	Type	Winner	Second	Third
1005	1	31 October 1999	(France) Tignes	GS _{255}	(Austria) Hermann Maier	(Switzerland) Michael von Grünigen	(Norway) Kjetil André Aamodt (Austria) Stephan Eberharter
1006	2	23 November 1999	(United States) Vail	SL _{293}	(Switzerland) Didier Plaschy	(Austria) Thomas Stangassinger	(Norway) Kjetil André Aamodt (Italy) Matteo Nana
1007	3	24 November 1999	(United States) Vail	GS _{256}	(Austria) Hermann Maier	(Switzerland) Michael von Grünigen	(Austria) Andreas Schifferer
1008	4	27 November 1999	(United States) Beaver Creek	DH _{295}	(Austria) Hermann Maier	(Austria) Stephan Eberharter	(Italy) Kristian Ghedina
1009	5	28 November 1999	(United States) Beaver Creek	SG _{086}	(Austria) Hermann Maier	(Austria) Stephan Eberharter	(Norway) Lasse Kjus
1010	6	4 December 1999	(Canada) Lake Louise	DH _{296}	(Austria) Hannes Trinkl	(Austria) Hermann Maier	(Austria) Stephan Eberharter
1011	7	5 December 1999	(Canada) Lake Louise	SG _{087}	(Austria) Hermann Maier	(Sweden) Fredrik Nyberg	(Austria) Josef Strobl
1012	8	13 December 1999	(Italy) Madonna di Campiglio	SL _{294}	(Norway) Finn Christian Jagge	(Austria) Benjamin Raich	(Austria) Thomas Stangassinger
1013	9	17 December 1999	(Italy) Val Gardena	DH _{297}	(Italy) Kristian Ghedina	(Austria) Josef Strobl	(Canada) Ed Podivinsky
1014	10	18 December 1999	(Italy) Val Gardena	DH _{298}	(Austria) Andreas Schifferer	(Italy) Kristian Ghedina	(Austria) Hermann Maier
1015	11	19 December 1999	(Italy) Alta Badia	GS _{257}	(France) Joël Chenal	(Austria) Hermann Maier	(Austria) Rainer Salzgeber
1016	12	21 December 1999	(Slovenia) Kranjska Gora	SL _{295}	(Switzerland) Didier Plaschy	(Austria) Benjamin Raich	(Austria) Thomas Stangassinger
1017	13	22 December 1999	(Austria) Saalbach	GS _{258}	(Austria) Christian Mayer	(Austria) Hermann Maier	(Austria) Benjamin Raich
1018	14	8 January 2000	(France) Chamonix	DH _{299}	(Austria) Hermann Maier	(Austria) Stephan Eberharter	(Austria) Hannes Trinkl
1019	15	9 January 2000	(France) Chamonix	SL _{296}	(Italy) Angelo Weiss	(Norway) Kjetil André Aamodt	(Slovenia) Matjaž Vrhovnik
1020	16	9 January 2000	(France) Chamonix	KB _{078}	(Norway) Kjetil André Aamodt	(Austria) Hermann Maier	(Switzerland) Paul Accola
1021	17	15 January 2000	(Switzerland) Wengen	DH _{300}	(Austria) Josef Strobl	(Austria) Hermann Maier	(Canada) Ed Podivinsky
1022	18	16 January 2000	(Switzerland) Wengen	SL _{297}	(Norway) Kjetil André Aamodt	(Norway) Ole Kristian Furuseth	(Slovenia) Drago Grubelnik
1023	19	21 January 2000	(Austria) Kitzbühel	SG _{088}	(Austria) Hermann Maier	(Austria) Werner Franz	(Switzerland) Didier Cuche
1024	20	22 January 2000	(Austria) Kitzbühel	DH _{301}	(Austria) Fritz Strobl	(Italy) Kristian Ghedina (Austria) Josef Strobl	
1025	21	23 January 2000	(Austria) Kitzbühel	SL _{298}	(Austria) Mario Matt	(Slovenia) Matjaž Vrhovnik	(Austria) Benjamin Raich
1026	22	23 January 2000	(Austria) Kitzbühel	KB _{079}	(Norway) Kjetil André Aamodt	(Sweden) Fredrik Nyberg	(Austria) Hermann Maier
1027	23	29 January 2000	(Germany) Garmisch-Partenkirchen	DH _{302}	(Austria) Hermann Maier	(Italy) Kristian Ghedina	(Austria) Hannes Trinkl
1028	24	5 February 2000	(Germany) Todtnau	GS _{259}	(Austria) Hermann Maier	(Sweden) Fredrik Nyberg	(Switzerland) Michael von Grünigen
1029	25	6 February 2000	(Germany) Todtnau	SL _{299}	(Austria) Rainer Schönfelder	(Norway) Kjetil André Aamodt	(Norway) Ole Kristian Furuseth
1030	26	12 February 2000	(Austria) St. Anton am Arlberg	SG _{089}	(Austria) Josef Strobl	(Switzerland) Didier Cuche	(Austria) Stephan Eberharter
1031	27	13 February 2000	(Austria) St. Anton am Arlberg	SG _{090}	(Austria) Werner Franz (Austria) Fritz Strobl		(Austria) Hermann Maier
1032	28	20 February 2000	(Switzerland) Adelboden	SL _{300}	(Slovenia) Matjaž Vrhovnik	(Norway) Kjetil André Aamodt	(Austria) Mario Matt
1033	29	26 February 2000	(South Korea) Yongpyong	GS _{260}	(Austria) Benjamin Raich	(Switzerland) Michael von Grünigen	(France) Joël Chenal
1034	30	27 February 2000	(South Korea) Yongpyong	SL _{301}	(Slovenia) Mitja Kunc	(Norway) Ole Kristian Furuseth	(Austria) Mario Matt
1035	31	3 March 2000	(Norway) Kvitfjell	DH _{303}	(United States) Daron Rahlves	(Switzerland) Didier Cuche	(Austria) Hermann Maier
1036	32	4 March 2000	(Norway) Kvitfjell	DH _{304}	(United States) Daron Rahlves	(Italy) Kristian Ghedina	(Germany) Max Rauffer
1037	33	5 March 2000	(Norway) Kvitfjell	SG _{091}	(Italy) Kristian Ghedina	(Austria) Hermann Maier	(Austria) Andreas Schifferer
1038	34	8 March 2000	(Slovenia) Kranjska Gora	GS _{261}	(Austria) Christian Mayer	(France) Joël Chenal	(Liechtenstein) Marco Büchel
1039	35	9 March 2000	(Austria) Schladming	SL _{302}	(Austria) Mario Matt	(Norway) Kjetil André Aamodt	(Austria) Thomas Stangassinger
1040	36	11 March 2000	(Austria) Hinterstoder	GS _{262}	(Austria) Christian Mayer	(Liechtenstein) Marco Büchel	(Austria) Hermann Maier
1041	37	15 March 2000	(Italy) Bormio	DH _{305}	(Austria) Hannes Trinkl	(Austria) Hermann Maier	(Austria) Christian Greber
1042	38	16 March 2000	(Italy) Bormio	SG _{092}	(Austria) Hermann Maier	(Austria) Fritz Strobl	(Austria) Werner Franz (Austria) Andreas Schifferer
1043	39	18 March 2000	(Italy) Bormio	GS _{263}	(Austria) Benjamin Raich	(Austria) Christian Mayer	(Austria) Heinz Schilchegger
1044	40	19 March 2000	(Italy) Bormio	SL _{303}	(Norway) Ole Kristian Furuseth	(Austria) Benjamin Raich	(Slovenia) Matjaž Vrhovnik

=== Ladies ===
Event key: DH – Downhill, SL – Slalom, GS – Giant slalom, SG – Super giant slalom, KB – Combined
Race	Season	Date	Place	Type	Winner	Second	Third
937	1	31 October 1999	(France) Tignes	GS _{249}	(Switzerland) Sonja Nef	(Sweden) Anna Ottosson	(Austria) Anita Wachter
938	2	19 November 1999	(United States) Copper Mountain	GS _{250}	(France) Régine Cavagnoud	(Italy) Karen Putzer	(Austria) Michaela Dorfmeister
939	3	20 November 1999	(United States) Copper Mountain	SL _{284}	(France) Christel Pascal (Slovenia) Špela Pretnar		(Norway) Trine Bakke
940	4	27 November 1999	(Canada) Lake Louise	DH _{246}	(Italy) Isolde Kostner	(Germany) Hilde Gerg	(Switzerland) Corinne Rey-Bellet
941	5	28 November 1999	(Canada) Lake Louise	SG _{091}	(Slovenia) Mojca Suhadolc	(Germany) Hilde Gerg	(Italy) Isolde Kostner
942	6	4 December 1999	(France) Serre Chevalier	GS _{251}	(Austria) Michaela Dorfmeister	(Austria) Anita Wachter	(Italy) Silke Bachmann
943	7	5 December 1999	(France) Serre Chevalier	SL _{285}	(Croatia) Janica Kostelić	(Norway) Trine Bakke	(Austria) Sabine Egger
944	8	8 December 1999	(France) Val d'Isère	SG _{092}	(Italy) Isolde Kostner	(Germany) Hilde Gerg	(Sweden) Pernilla Wiberg
945	9	9 December 1999	(France) Val d'Isère	GS _{252}	(Austria) Michaela Dorfmeister	(Austria) Silvia Berger	(France) Régine Cavagnoud
946	10	12 December 1999	(Italy) Sestriere	SL _{286}	(Croatia) Janica Kostelić	(Sweden) Anja Pärson	(France) Christel Pascal
947	11	17 December 1999	(Switzerland) St. Moritz	DH _{247}	(Italy) Isolde Kostner	(Germany) Regina Häusl	(Slovenia) Špela Bračun
948	12	18 December 1999	(Switzerland) St. Moritz	DH _{248}	(Sweden) Pernilla Wiberg	(Austria) Renate Götschl	(Germany) Hilde Gerg
949	13	19 December 1999	(Switzerland) St. Moritz	SG _{093}	(Italy) Karen Putzer	(Italy) Alessandra Merlin	(France) Régine Cavagnoud
950	14	28 December 1999	(Austria) Lienz	GS _{253}	(Austria) Anita Wachter	(Canada) Allison Forsyth	(Liechtenstein) Birgit Heeb
951	15	29 December 1999	(Austria) Lienz	SL _{287}	(Austria) Sabine Egger	(Slovenia) Nataša Bokal	(Austria) Karin Köllerer
952	16	5 January 2000	(Slovenia) Maribor	GS _{254}	(Austria) Michaela Dorfmeister	(Switzerland) Sonja Nef	(Austria) Anita Wachter
953	17	6 January 2000	(Slovenia) Maribor	SL _{288}	(Norway) Trine Bakke	(Slovenia) Špela Pretnar	(Austria) Sabine Egger
954	18	8 January 2000	(Germany) Berchtesgaden	GS _{255}	(Austria) Michaela Dorfmeister	(Italy) Karen Putzer	(Germany) Martina Ertl
955	19	9 January 2000	(Germany) Berchtesgaden	SL _{289}	(Slovenia) Špela Pretnar	(France) Christel Pascal	(Norway) Trine Bakke
956	20	15 January 2000	(Austria) Altenmarkt	DH _{249}	(Switzerland) Corinne Rey-Bellet	(Germany) Regina Häusl	(Germany) Martina Ertl
957	21	16 January 2000	(Austria) Altenmarkt	SG _{094}	(Austria) Renate Götschl	(Austria) Tanja Schneider	(Germany) Regina Häusl
958	22	22 January 2000	(Italy) Cortina d'Ampezzo	DH _{250}	(France) Régine Cavagnoud	(Austria) Tanja Schneider	(Slovenia) Mojca Suhadolc
959	23	23 January 2000	(Italy) Cortina d'Ampezzo	GS _{256}	(Sweden) Anna Ottosson	(Canada) Allison Forsyth (Liechtenstein) Birgit Heeb	
960	24	10 February 2000	(Italy) Santa Caterina	DH _{251}	(Italy) Isolde Kostner	(Germany) Regina Häusl	(Switzerland) Corinne Rey-Bellet
961	25	11 February 2000	(Italy) Santa Caterina	SG _{095}	(Austria) Michaela Dorfmeister	(France) Régine Cavagnoud	(Austria) Renate Götschl
962	26	12 February 2000	(Italy) Santa Caterina	SL _{290}	(Slovenia) Špela Pretnar	(France) Christel Pascal	(Sweden) Anja Pärson
963	27	12 February 2000	(Italy) Santa Caterina	KB _{068}	(Austria) Renate Götschl	(United States) Caroline Lalive	(Norway) Andrine Flemmen
964	28	17 February 2000	(Sweden) Åre	GS _{257}	(Switzerland) Sonja Nef	(Austria) Anita Wachter	(Austria) Brigitte Obermoser
965	29	18 February 2000	(Sweden) Åre	DH _{252}	(Austria) Renate Götschl	(Germany) Regina Häusl	(Austria) Stefanie Schuster
966	30	20 February 2000	(Sweden) Åre	SL _{291}	(Slovenia) Špela Pretnar	(United States) Kristina Koznick	(Sweden) Anja Pärson
967	31	25 February 2000	(Austria) Innsbruck	DH _{253}	(Austria) Renate Götschl	(Germany) Regina Häusl	(Austria) Michaela Dorfmeister
968	32	26 February 2000	(Austria) Innsbruck	SG _{096}	(Canada) Mélanie Turgeon	(Austria) Renate Götschl	(Austria) Tanja Schneider
969	33	27 February 2000	(Austria) Innsbruck	SG _{097}	(Austria) Renate Götschl	(Canada) Mélanie Turgeon	(Slovenia) Mojca Suhadolc
970	34	5 March 2000	(Switzerland) Lenzerheide	DH _{254}	(Switzerland) Corinne Imlig	(Germany) Petra Haltmayr	(Russia) Olesya Aliyeva (Austria) Renate Götschl
971	35	10 March 2000	(Italy) Sestriere	SL _{292}	(United States) Kristina Koznick	(France) Christel Pascal	(Slovenia) Špela Pretnar
972	36	11 March 2000	(Italy) Sestriere	GS _{258}	(Switzerland) Sonja Nef	(Spain) Carolina Ruiz Castillo	(Austria) Michaela Dorfmeister
973	37	15 March 2000	(Italy) Bormio	DH _{255}	(France) Régine Cavagnoud	(Switzerland) Corinne Rey-Bellet	(Austria) Renate Götschl
974	38	16 March 2000	(Italy) Bormio	SG _{098}	(Austria) Renate Götschl	(Germany) Martina Ertl	(Austria) Brigitte Obermoser
975	39	18 March 2000	(Italy) Bormio	GS _{259}	(Austria) Brigitte Obermoser	(Austria) Michaela Dorfmeister	(Liechtenstein) Birgit Heeb
976	40	19 March 2000	(Italy) Bormio	SL _{293}	(United States) Kristina Koznick	(Sweden) Anja Pärson	(Italy) Elisabetta Biavaschi

== Men ==
=== Overall ===
see complete table

Place	Name	Country	Total
1	Hermann Maier	Austria	2000
2	Kjetil André Aamodt	Norway	1440
3	Josef Strobl	Austria	994
4	Kristian Ghedina	Italy	958
5	Andreas Schifferer	Austria	905
6	Stephan Eberharter	Austria	904
7	Fritz Strobl	Austria	889
8	Christian Mayer	Austria	802
9	Benjamin Raich	Austria	788
10	Werner Franz	Austria	762

=== Downhill ===
see complete table

In men's downhill World Cup 1999/2000 the all results count.

Place	Name	Country	Total	4 (United States)	6 (Canada)	9 (Italy)	10 (Italy)	14 (France)	17 (Switzerland)	20 (Austria)	23 (Germany)	31 (Norway)	32 (Norway)	37 (Italy)
1	Hermann Maier	Austria	800	100	80	40	60	100	80	50	100	60	50	80
2	Kristian Ghedina	Italy	677	60	32	100	80	50	50	80	45	80	80	20
3	Josef Strobl	Austria	533	7	50	80	50	45	100	80	50	13	22	36
4	Hannes Trinkl	Austria	507	-	100	20	11	60	45	45	60	26	40	100
5	Stephan Eberharter	Austria	454	80	60	45	15	80	36	26	40	36	36	-
6	Fritz Strobl	Austria	453	14	26	50	40	29	45	100	36	50	13	50
7	Andreas Schifferer	Austria	354	32	45	26	100	36	16	40	32	18	9	-
8	Werner Franz	Austria	317	40	3	32	32	24	26	29	45	32	14	40
9	Ed Podivinsky	Canada	298	20	22	60	26	11	60	16	16	2	20	45
10	Daron Rahlves	United States	273	-	16	3	-	3	9	5	8	100	100	29

=== Super G ===
see complete table

In men's super G World Cup 1999/2000 all results count. Hermann Maier won his third Super G World Cup in a row. Austrian athletes won six races out of seven.

Place	Name	Country	Total	6 (United States)	7 (Canada)	19 (Austria)	26 (Austria)	27 (Austria)	33 (Norway)	38 (Italy)
1	Hermann Maier	Austria	540	100	100	100	-	60	80	100
2	Werner Franz	Austria	371	32	29	80	50	100	20	60
3	Fritz Strobl	Austria	354	15	45	24	40	100	50	80
4	Josef Strobl	Austria	305	26	60	50	100	24	29	16
5	Andreas Schifferer	Austria	294	50	36	24	24	40	60	60
6	Fredrik Nyberg	Sweden	272	36	80	13	45	50	3	45
7	Stephan Eberharter	Austria	246	80	50	-	60	32	-	24
8	Kristian Ghedina	Italy	216	-	40	32	15	9	100	20
9	Didier Cuche	Switzerland	214	22	7	60	80	45	-	-
10	Daron Rahlves	United States	183	18	32	26	-	22	45	40

=== Giant slalom ===
see complete table

In men's giant slalom World Cup 1999/2000 all results count. Austrian athletes won eight races out of nine.

Place	Name	Country	Total	1 (France)	3 (United States)	11 (Italy)	13 (Austria)	24 (Germany)	29 (South Korea)	34 (Slovenia)	36 (Austria)	39 (Italy)
1	Hermann Maier	Austria	520	100	100	80	80	100	-	-	60	-
2	Christian Mayer	Austria	517	40	15	36	100	32	14	100	100	80
3	Michael von Grünigen	Switzerland	466	80	80	26	50	60	80	32	18	40
4	Benjamin Raich	Austria	420	45	32	12	60	45	100	-	26	100
5	Joël Chenal	France	349	26	18	100	40	16	60	80	9	-
6	Marco Büchel	Liechtenstein	290	-	13	-	13	50	45	60	80	29
7	Fredrik Nyberg	Sweden	279	-	45	24	32	80	-	26	40	32
8	Mitja Kunc	Slovenia	275	22	16	20	20	29	50	36	32	50
9	Kjetil André Aamodt	Norway	259	60	40	50	36	26	18	29	-	-
10	Heinz Schilchegger	Austria	233	9	20	13	14	24	7	50	36	60

=== Slalom ===
see complete table

In men's slalom World Cup 1999/2000 the all results count.

Place	Name	Country	Total	2 (United States)	8 (Italy)	12 (Slovenia)	15 (France)	18 (Switzerland)	21 (Austria)	25 (Germany)	28 (Switzerland)	30 (South Korea)	35 (Austria)	40 (Italy)
1	Kjetil André Aamodt	Norway	598	60	32	22	80	100	36	80	80	18	50	40
2	Ole Kristian Furuseth	Norway	544	-	26	-	50	80	50	60	18	80	80	100
3	Matjaž Vrhovnik	Slovenia	538	26	40	40	60	50	80	45	100	15	22	60
4	Mario Matt	Austria	384	-	-	14	-	-	100	50	60	60	100	-
5	Thomas Stangassinger	Austria	369	80	60	60	36	6	45	22	-	-	60	-
6	Benjamin Raich	Austria	368	-	80	80	32	-	60	36	-	-	-	80
7	Rainer Schönfelder	Austria	307	20	29	29	15	40	18	100	-	24	-	32
8	Didier Plaschy	Switzerland	281	100	-	100	-	-	-	-	-	36	-	45
9	Hans Petter Buraas	Norway	261	45	-	20	-	22	-	29	50	-	45	50
10	Jure Košir	Slovenia	238	15	45	36	8	29	12	24	40	7	-	22
11	Angelo Weiss	Italy	237	-	36	-	100	36	-	20	16	-	-	29
12	Mitja Kunc	Slovenia	232	-	9	24	45	24	16	-	-	100	14	-
13	Sébastien Amiez	France	190	32	-	-	-	7	-	32	45	22	32	20
14	Kilian Albrecht	Austria	189	9	5	-	9	9	29	12	24	26	40	26
15	Finn Christian Jagge	Norway	180	11	100	-	-	15	9	26	-	10	9	-

=== Combined ===
see complete table

In men's combined World Cup 1999/2000 both results count. Kjetil André Aamodt won his fourth Combined World Cup.

Place	Name	Country	Total	16 (France)	22 (Austria)
1	Kjetil André Aamodt	Norway	200	100	100
2	Hermann Maier	Austria	140	80	60
3	Frederik Nyberg	Sweden	102	22	80
4	Paul Accola	Switzerland	100	60	40
5	Fritz Strobl	Austria	82	32	50
6	Bruno Kernen	Switzerland	81	36	45
7	Werner Franz	Austria	74	45	29
8	Kristian Ghedina	Italy	65	29	36
9	Stephan Eberharter	Austria	50	50	-
10	Hannes Trinkl	Austria	44	18	26
	Antoine Dénériaz	France	44	20	24

== Ladies ==
=== Overall ===
Place	Name	Country	Total
1	Renate Götschl	Austria	1631
2	Michaela Dorfmeister	Austria	1306
3	Régine Cavagnoud	France	1036
4	Isolde Kostner	Italy	878
5	Brigitte Obermoser	Austria	806
6	Sonja Nef	Switzerland	789
7	Špela Pretnar	Slovenia	714
8	Anja Pärson	Sweden	704
9	Martina Ertl	Germany	701
10	Tanja Schneider	Austria	695

=== Downhill ===
Place	Name	Country	Total
1	Regina Häusl	Germany	529
2	Renate Götschl	Austria	524
3	Isolde Kostner	Italy	484
4	Corinne Rey-Bellet	Switzerland	435
5	Régine Cavagnoud	France	417

=== Super G ===
Place	Name	Country	Total
1	Renate Götschl	Austria	554
2	Melanie Turgeon	Canada	343
3	Mojca Suhadolc	Slovenia	341
4	Régine Cavagnoud	France	330
5	Isolde Kostner	Italy	300

=== Giant slalom ===
Place	Name	Country	Total
1	Michaela Dorfmeister	Austria	684
2	Sonja Nef	Switzerland	602
3	Anita Wachter	Austria	470
4	Anna Ottosson	Sweden	402
5	Allison Forsyth	Canada	373

=== Slalom ===
Place	Name	Country	Total
1	Špela Pretnar	Slovenia	645
2	Christel Pascal	France	626
3	Anja Pärson	Sweden	499
4	Trine Bakke	Norway	434
5	Kristina Koznick	United States	428

=== Combined ===
Place	Name	Country	Total
1	Renate Götschl	Austria	100
2	Caroline Lalive	United States	80
3	Andrine Flemmen	Norway	60
4	Stefanie Schuster	Austria	50
5	Michaela Dorfmeister	Austria	45
