= 2003 Alpine Skiing World Cup – Women's slalom =

2003 Women's slalom World Cup
Previous: 2002	Next: 2004

Women's slalom World Cup 2002/2003

== Final point standings ==
In women's slalom World Cup 2002/03 all results count. Race No. 11 at Sestriere was a K.O.-Slalom.

Place	Name	Country	Total points	3 (United States)	5 (United States)	11 (Italy)	13 (Switzerland)	16 (Austria)	18 (Italy)	24 (Slovenia)	29 (Sweden)	32 (Norway)
1	Janica Kostelić	Croatia	710	100	80	50	100	100	100	80	100	-
2	Anja Pärson	Sweden	498	18	100	100	-	-	60	100	80	40
3	Tanja Poutiainen	Finland	367	12	18	80	80	-	50	32	45	50
4	Christel Pascal	France	359	80	45	26	14	80	13	45	32	24
5	Marlies Schild	Austria	342	45	60	22	-	40	36	50	29	60
6	Laure Pequegnot	France	341	50	-	40	-	50	36	45	40	80
7	Nicole Gius	Italy	264	29	36	20	18	60	13	2	50	36
8	Monika Bergmann	Germany	245	20	24	16	50	26	40	9	60	-
9	Martina Ertl	Germany	228	24	32	32	13	-	36	10	36	45
10	Nicole Hosp	Austria	226	32	50	60	-	-	24	60	-	-
11	Kristina Koznick	United States	212	13	-	11	26	-	26	36	-	100
12	Sarah Schleper	United States	186	40	-	24	36	45	14	-	5	22
13	Annemarie Gerg	Germany	166	16	11	18	45	36	18	-	22	-
14	Sonja Nef	Switzerland	165	36	40	8	36	-	45	-	-	-
15	Sabine Egger	Austria	164	60	26	36	-	-	3	3	18	18
16	Trine Bakke-Rognmo	Norway	147	14	20	13	22	32	-	26	-	20
17	Anna Ottosson	Sweden	121	15	22	-	-	-	16	16	26	26
18	Elisabeth Görgl	Austria	112	-	-	12	-	20	80	-	-	-
19	Šárka Záhrobská	Czech Republic	107	-	-	45	8	18	-	12	24	-
20	Marlies Oester	Switzerland	105	10	29	10	11	-	9	-	20	16
21	Claudia Riegler	New Zealand	99	11	9	1	60	-	-	18	-	-
22	Karin Truppe	Austria	93	-	-	-	29	-	8	16	11	29
23	Susanne Ekman	Sweden	91	22	10	5	-	22	-	24	8	-
24	Vanessa Vidal	France	86	-	5	3	40	16	22	-	-	-
25	Špela Pretnar	Slovenia	64	-	18	9	15	-	5	4	13	-
26	Corina Grünenfelder	Switzerland	61	4	14	-	-	-	2	29	12	-
27	Lisa Bremseth	Norway	56	-	-	-	10	26	1	5	14	-
28	Hedda Berntsen	Norway	55	-	4	7	16	-	6	22	-	-
29	Britt Janyk	Canada	50	-	7	-	12	-	15	-	16	-
30	Christine Sponring	Austria	49	-	12	15	-	-	-	22	-	-
	Carina Raich	Austria	49	-	6	29	7	-	-	7	-	-
32	Line Viken	Norway	48	-	3	-	20	16	-	-	9	-
33	Manuela Mölgg	Italy	46	-	-	6	-	29	-	11	-	-
34	Lea Dabič	Slovenia	43	5	18	-	-	-	20	-	-	-
35	Annalisa Ceresa	Italy	42	-	13	-	9	-	7	13	-	-
36	Michaela Kirchgasser	Austria	40	-	-	-	-	-	-	8	-	32
37	Nika Fleiss	Croatia	39	26	-	-	-	13	-	-	-	-
38	Henna Raita	Finland	33	8	-	14	-	-	11	-	-	-
39	Resi Stiegler	United States	24	-	-	-	24	-	-	-	-	-
40	Maria Riesch	Germany	22	-	-	2	6	-	-	14	-	-
41	María José Rienda	Spain	19	7	-	-	-	12	-	-	-	-
42	Silke Bachmann	Italy	18	-	-	4	-	14	-	-	-	-
	Daniela Merighetti	Italy	18	3	-	-	-	11	4	-	-	-
44	Julia Mancuso	United States	17	6	-	-	-	-	11	-	-	-
45	Claudia Morandini	Italy	15	-	-	-	-	-	-	-	15	-
46	Nataša Bokal	Slovenia	10	2	8	-	-	-	-	-	-	-
	Petra Zakouřilová	Czech Republic	10	-	-	-	-	-	-	-	10	-
48	Emma Carrick-Anderson	United Kingdom	9	9	-	-	-	-	-	-	-	-
49	Malin Hultdin	Sweden	7	-	-	-	-	-	-	-	7	-
50	Denise Karbon	Italy	6	-	-	-	-	-	-	6	-	-
	Allison Forsyth	Canada	6	-	-	-	-	-	-	-	6	-
52	Florine de Leymarie	France	4	-	-	-	-	-	-	-	4	-

Note:

In the last race only the best racers were allowed to compete and only the best 15 finishers were awarded with points.

Alpine skiing World Cup
Women

Overall | Downhill | Super-G | Giant slalom | Slalom | Combined

2003
