= Alpine skiing at the 2002 Winter Olympics – Women's downhill =

Women's downhill at the XIX Olympic Winter Games
- Pictogram for alpine skiing
- Venue: Snowbasin
- Date: February 12, 2002
- Competitors: 39 from 17 nations
- Winning time: 1:39.56

Medalists
| 1st place, gold medalist(s) | | Carole Montillet | France |
| 2nd place, silver medalist(s) | | Isolde Kostner | Italy |
| 3rd place, bronze medalist(s) | | Renate Götschl | Austria |

Women's Downhill
- Location: Snowbasin; Wildflower Downhill
- Vertical: 800 m (2,625 ft)
- Top elevation: 2,748 m (9,016 ft)
- Base elevation: 1,948 m (6,391 ft)

The women's downhill event of the 2002 Winter Olympics was held at Snowbasin on Tuesday, February 12.

Carole Montillet was the surprise winner, and favorites Isolde Kostner (silver) and Renate Götschl (bronze) were the other medalists.

The Wildflower Downhill course started at an elevation of 2,748 m (9,016 ft) above sea level with a vertical drop of 800 m (2,625 ft) and a course length of 2.694 km (1.67 mi). Montillet's winning time was 99.56 seconds, yielding an average course speed of 97.413 km/h (60.5 mph), with an average vertical descent rate of 8.035 m/s (26.4 ft/s).

== Results ==
Delayed by over 26 hours due to high winds, the race started at 12:10 local time, (UTC−7) under clear skies. At the starting gate, the air temperature was −8.0 °C (18 °F) and the snow condition was hard; the air temperature at the finish area was −1.0 °C (30 °F).

| Rank | Bib | Name | Country | Time | Difference |
|---|---|---|---|---|---|
| 1st place, gold medalist(s) | 11 | Carole Montillet | France | 1:39.56 | — |
| 2nd place, silver medalist(s) | 14 | Isolde Kostner | Italy | 1:40.01 | +0.45 |
| 3rd place, bronze medalist(s) | 15 | Renate Götschl | Austria | 1:40.39 | +0.83 |
| 4 | 13 | Hilde Gerg | Germany | 1:40.49 | +0.93 |
| 5 | 21 | Corinne Rey-Bellet | Switzerland | 1:40.54 | +0.98 |
| 6 | 12 | Selina Heregger | Austria | 1:40.56 | +1.00 |
| 7 | 18 | Sylviane Berthod | Switzerland | 1:40.67 | +1.11 |
| 8 | 24 | Mélanie Turgeon | Canada | 1:40.71 | +1.15 |
| 9 | 25 | Michaela Dorfmeister | Austria | 1:40.83 | +1.27 |
| 10 | 16 | Regina Häusl | Germany | 1:40.84 | +1.28 |
| 11 | 28 | Jonna Mendes | United States | 1:40.97 | +1.41 |
| 12 | 17 | Kirsten Clark | United States | 1:41.03 | +1.47 |
| 13 | 10 | Ingeborg Helen Marken | Norway | 1:41.08 | +1.52 |
| 14 | 20 | Pernilla Wiberg | Sweden | 1:41.09 | +1.53 |
| 15 | 8 | Mélanie Suchet | France | 1:41.15 | +1.59 |
| 16 | 26 | Picabo Street | United States | 1:41.17 | +1.61 |
| 17 | 3 | Patrizia Bassis | Italy | 1:41.56 | +2.00 |
| 18 | 19 | Brigitte Obermoser | Austria | 1:41.64 | +2.08 |
| 19 | 9 | Catherine Borghi | Switzerland | 1:41.88 | +2.32 |
| 20 | 22 | Daniela Ceccarelli | Italy | 1:42.03 | +2.47 |
| 21 | 30 | Varvara Zelenskaya | Russia | 1:42.43 | +2.87 |
| 22 | 1 | Špela Bračun | Slovenia | 1:42.48 | +2.92 |
| 23 | 23 | Ingrid Jacquemod | France | 1:42.70 | +3.14 |
| 24 | 5 | Lucia Recchia | Italy | 1:42.80 | +3.24 |
| 25 | 4 | Janette Hargin | Sweden | 1:42.83 | +3.27 |
| 26 | 29 | Sibylle Brauner | Germany | 1:42.97 | +3.41 |
| 27 | 33 | Alice Jones | Australia | 1:43.07 | +3.51 |
| 28 | 6 | Mojca Suhadolc | Slovenia | 1:43.10 | +3.54 |
| 29 | 31 | Jenny Owens | Australia | 1:44.15 | +4.59 |
| 30 | 35 | Gabriela Martinovová | Czech Republic | 1:44.25 | +4.69 |
| 31 | 37 | Dagný Linda Kristjánsdóttir | Iceland | 1:44.72 | +5.16 |
| 32 | 34 | Chemmy Alcott | Great Britain | 1:45.98 | +6.42 |
| 33 | 36 | Alexandra Munteanu | Romania | 1:46.29 | +6.73 |
| 34 | 38 | Macarena Simari Birkner | Argentina | 1:46.77 | +7.21 |
| 35 | 39 | María Belén Simari Birkner | Argentina | 1:46.97 | +7.41 |
| | 32 | Sara-Maude Boucher | Canada | DNS | |
| | 2 | Caroline Lalive | United States | DNF | |
| | 7 | Petra Haltmayr | Germany | DNF | |
| | 27 | Anne Marie Lefrancois | Canada | DNF | |
