= Alpine skiing at the 2002 Winter Olympics – Women's super-G =

Women's super-G at the XIX Olympic Winter Games
- Pictogram for alpine skiing
- Venue: Snowbasin – Wildflower
- Date: February 17, 2002
- Competitors: 45 from 21 nations
- Winning time: 1:13.59

Medalists
1st place, gold medalist(s)		Daniela Ceccarelli	Italy
2nd place, silver medalist(s)		Janica Kostelić	Croatia
3rd place, bronze medalist(s)		Karen Putzer	Italy

Women's super-G
- Location: Snowbasin; Wildflower Super-G
- Vertical: 600 m (1,969 ft)
- Top elevation: 2,548 m (8,360 ft) AMSL
- Base elevation: 1,948 m (6,391 ft)
- Longest run: 1.944 km (1.21 mi)

The women's super-G of the 2002 Winter Olympics was held on Sunday, February 17, on the Wildflower course at Snowbasin, east of Ogden, Utah.

== Results ==
The race started at 10:00 local time (UTC-7) under partly cloudy skies. The air temperature was 3.0 °C (37 °F) at the starting gate and 7.0 °C (45 °F) at the finish area; the snow condition was hard.

Rank	Name	Country	Time	Difference
1st place, gold medalist(s)	Daniela Ceccarelli	Italy	1:13.59	—
2nd place, silver medalist(s)	Janica Kostelić	Croatia	1:13.64	+0.05
3rd place, bronze medalist(s)	Karen Putzer	Italy	1:13.86	+0.27
4	Alexandra Meissnitzer	Austria	1:13.95	+0.36
5	Hilde Gerg	Germany	1:13.99	+0.40
6	Michaela Dorfmeister	Austria	1:14.08	+0.49
7	Carole Montillet	France	1:14.28	+0.69
8	Renate Götschl	Austria	1:14.44	+0.85
9	Corinne Rey-Bellet	Switzerland	1:14.73	+1.14
10	Mélanie Suchet	France	1:14.83	+1.24
11	Martina Ertl	Germany	1:14.84	+1.25
12	Pernilla Wiberg	Sweden	1:14.89	+1.30
13	Isolde Kostner	Italy	1:14.99	+1.40
14	Kirsten Clark	United States	1:15.13	+1.54
15	Carolina Ruiz Castillo	Spain	1:15.17	+1.58
16	Jonna Mendes	United States	1:15.25	+1.66
17	Kathleen Monahan	United States	1:15.59	+2.00
18	Catherine Borghi	Switzerland	1:15.62	+2.03
18	Geneviève Simard	Canada	1:15.62	+2.03
20	Mélanie Turgeon	Canada	1:15.76	+2.17
21	Mojca Suhadolc	Slovenia	1:15.90	+2.31
22	Ingrid Jacquemod	France	1:16.17	+2.58
23	Petra Haltmayr	Germany	1:16.25	+2.66
24	Špela Bračun	Slovenia	1:16.35	+2.76
25	Lucie Hrstková	Czech Republic	1:16.56	+2.97
26	Varvara Zelenskaya	Russia	1:16.62	+3.03
27	Janette Hargin	Sweden	1:16.75	+3.16
28	Chemmy Alcott	Great Britain	1:17.34	+3.75
29	Alexandra Munteanu	Romania	1:17.84	+4.25
29	Jenny Owens	Australia	1:17.84	+4.25
31	Macarena Simari Birkner	Argentina	1:20.24	+6.65
	María Belén Simari Birkner	Argentina	DNS	
	Nadejda Vassileva	Bulgaria	DNS	
	Caroline Lalive	United States	DNF	
	Tanja Schneider	Austria	DNF	
	Sylviane Berthod	Switzerland	DNF	
	Patrizia Bassis	Italy	DNF	
	Regina Häusl	Germany	DNF	
	Anne-Marie LeFrançois	Canada	DNF	
	Ingeborg Helen Marken	Norway	DNF	
	Sara-Maude Boucher	Canada	DNF	
	Gabriela Martinovová	Czech Republic	DNF	
	Dagný Linda Kristjánsdóttir	Iceland	DNF	
	Alice Jones	Australia	DNF	
	Anita Irarrazába	Chile	DNF	
