= Carolina Castillo =

Carolina Castillo may refer to:

- Carolina Ruiz Castillo (born 1981), Spanish skier
- Carolina Castillo (wrestler) (born 1990), Colombian freestyle wrestler
