= Daniela Ceccarelli =

Italian alpine skier

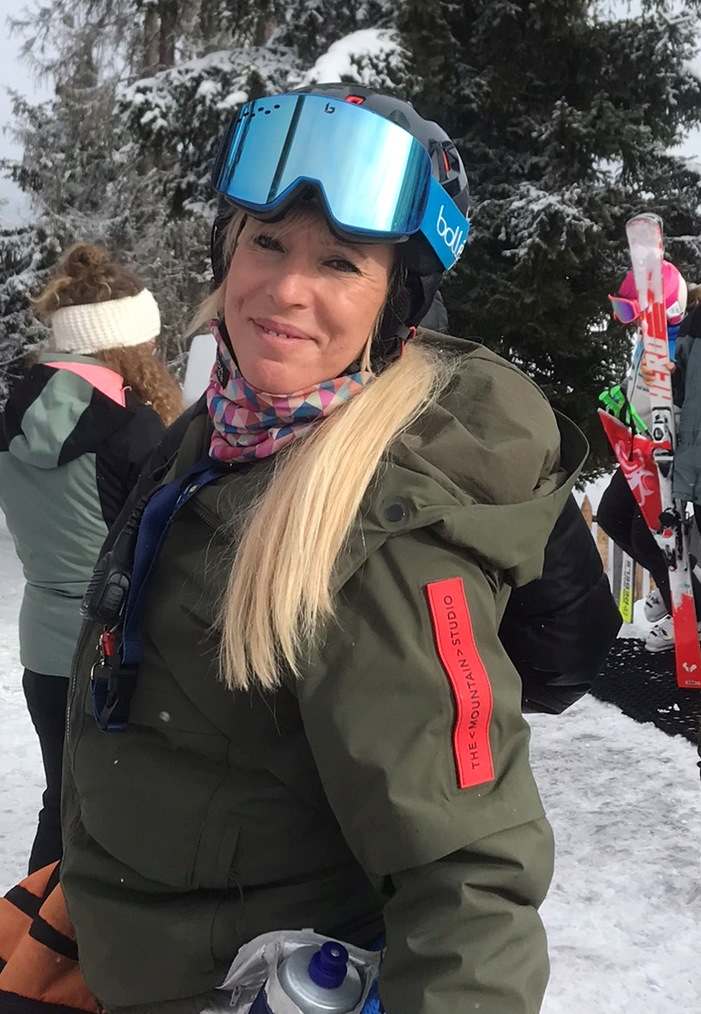
- Ceccarelli in 2023

Personal information
- Born: 25 September 1975 (age 50) Rocca Priora, Italy
- Height: 1.68 m (5 ft 6 in)
- Website: ceccarelligoldenteam.it

Skiing career
- Country: Italy
- Sport: Alpine skiing
- Club: G.S. Fiamme Oro
- Retired: 2010 (age 34)
- Disciplines: Downhill, Super-G, Combined, Giant slalom
- World Cup debut: 7 March 1996 (age 20)

Olympics
- Teams: 2 – (2002, 2006)
- Medals: 1 (1 gold)

World Championships
- Teams: 4 – (1999, 2001, 2003, 2005)
- Medals: 0

World Cup
- Seasons: 15
- Wins: 0
- Podiums: 3 – (1 DH, 2 SG)
- Overall titles: 0 – (16th in 2003)
- Discipline titles: 0 – (6th in SG, 2003)
Medal record
Women's alpine skiing
Representing Italy
World Cup race podiums
Event	1st	2nd	3rd
Downhill	0	0	1
Super-G	0	2	0
Total	0	2	1
International competitions
Olympic Games
Gold medal – first place	2002 Salt Lake City	Super-G

Daniela Ceccarelli (born 25 September 1975) is an Italian alpine skiing coach and former World Cup ski racer.

At the 2002 Winter Olympics in Salt Lake City, she won a surprise gold medal in the super-G competition at Snowbasin. After her retirement, she started her own ski club, under the name Golden Team Ceccarelli, along with her family. She is the mother of the Albanian alpine racer Lara Colturi (b.2006).

== Biography ==
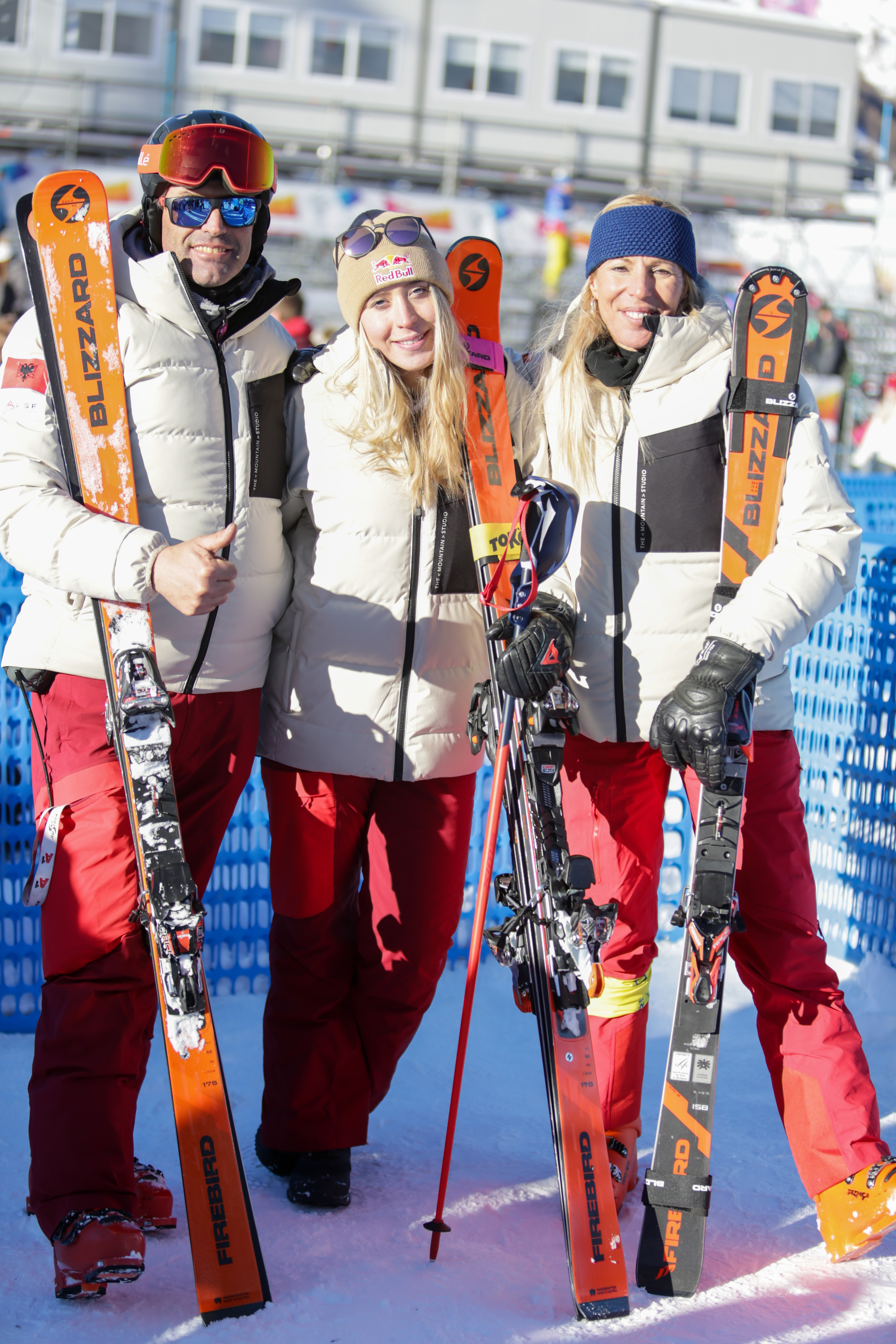
Ceccarelli (right) with her husband Alessandro Colturi and her daughter Lara Colturi.

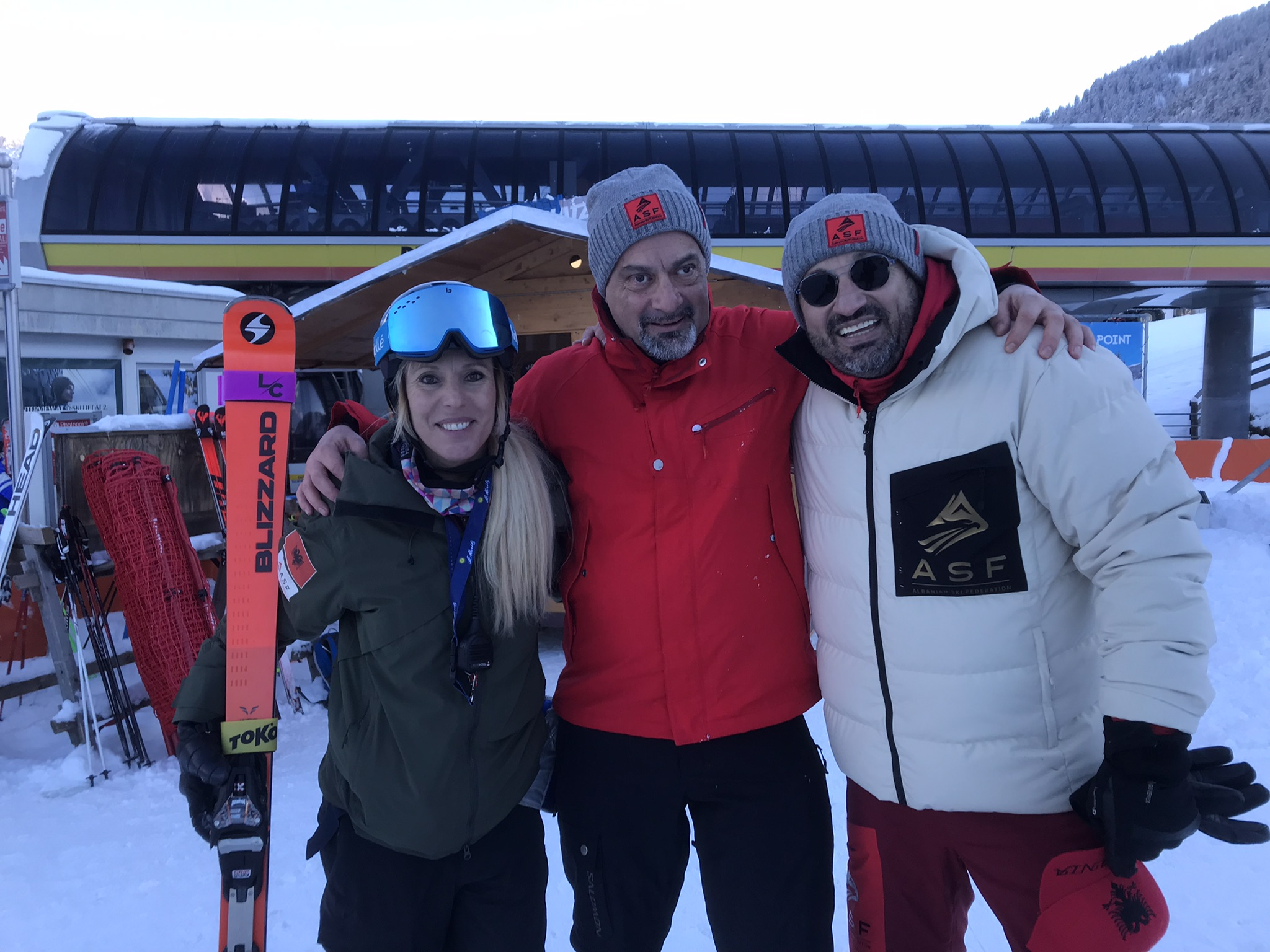
Ceccarelli, engineer Giuseppe Palamara and the President of the Albanian Ski Federation Elvis Toci shot in San Vigilio di Marebbe in 2023.

Daniela Ceccarelli in her 16 years of high-level competitive activity, from 1996 to 2010, conquered three podiums in World Cup races, two second places in super-G and a third place in downhill, but her most important result it is undoubtedly the Olympic gold medal won at the 2002 Salt Lake City Winter Olympics. She has also won the Italian Alpine Ski Championships two times and various other podium finishes.

After her career as an athlete, she founded a ski team, the Golden Team Daniela Ceccarelli, in which she is also a coach, and subsequently she also became technical commissioner of the Albanian national ski team, for which nation her daughter Lara Colturi also competes.

Until 2021, she was also a technical commentator for the ski races for the Italian RAI radio and television.

== World Cup results ==
=== Season standings ===
Season	Age	Overall	Slalom	Giant slalom	Super-G	Downhill	Combined
1998	22	84	—	—	44	36	—
1999	23	66	—	—	35	37	—
2000	24	64	—	—	25	33	—
2001	25	40	—	—	16	32	—
2002	26	19	—	—	7	11	8
2003	27	16	—	44	6	13	16
2004	28	30	—	—	22	13	—
2005	29	56	—	—	47	19	24
2006	30	49	—	—	27	29	—
2007	31	109	—	—	43	—	—
2008	32	46	—	—	26	27	—
2009	33	78	—	—	39	33	—
2010	34	no World Cup points					

=== Race podiums ===
- 0 wins
- 3 podiums - (1 DH, 2 SG), 24 top tens

Season	Date	Location	Discipline	Place
2002	22 Dec 2001	St. Moritz, Switzerland	Super-G	2nd
2002	26 Jan 2002	Cortina d'Ampezzo, Italy	Downhill	3rd
2003	13 Dec 2002	Val d'Isère, France	Super-G	2nd

== World Championship results ==
Year	Age	Slalom	Giant Slalom	Super G	Downhill	Combined
1999	23	—	—	18	—	—
2001	25	—	—	15	16	15
2003	27	—	—	DNF	13	—
2005	29	—	—	—	14	DSQ2

== Olympic results ==
Year	Age	Slalom	Giant Slalom	Super G	Downhill	Combined
2002	26	—	—	1	20	15
2006	30	—	—	31	—	—

== National titles ==
Ceccarelli won two national championships at the individual senior level.

- Italian Alpine Ski Championships
  - Super-G: 2002
  - Downhill: 2003

== See also ==
- Italy national alpine ski team at the Olympics
