= Matjaž Vrhovnik =

Slovenian alpine skier (born 1972)

Matjaž Vrhovnik (born 6 May 1972) is a former Slovenian former alpine skier.

Vrhovnik has one victory in Alpine Skiing World Cup, from 2000 in slalom. That same year, he also finished 3rd in the overall slalom standings. He won 3 more podiums in World Cup, all in slalom.

== World Cup results ==
=== Season standings ===
Season	Age	Overall	Slalom	Giant slalom	Super-G	Downhill	Combined
1995	22	110	38	—	—	—	—
1996	23	78	27	—	—	—	—
1997	24	72	27	—	—	—	—
1998	25	91	35	—	—	—	—
1999	26	89	35	—	—	—	—
2000	27	17	3	—	—	—	—
2001	28	46	15	—	—	—	—
2002	29	135	56	—	—	—	—

=== Race podiums ===
Season	Date	Location	Discipline	Position
2000	9 January 2000	Chamonix, France	Slalom	3rd
2000	23 January 2000	Kitzbühel, Austria	Slalom	2nd
2000	20 February 2000	Adelboden, Switzerland	Slalom	1st
2000	19 March 2000	Bormio, Italy	Slalom	3rd
