= Joël Chenal =

French alpine skier (born 1973)

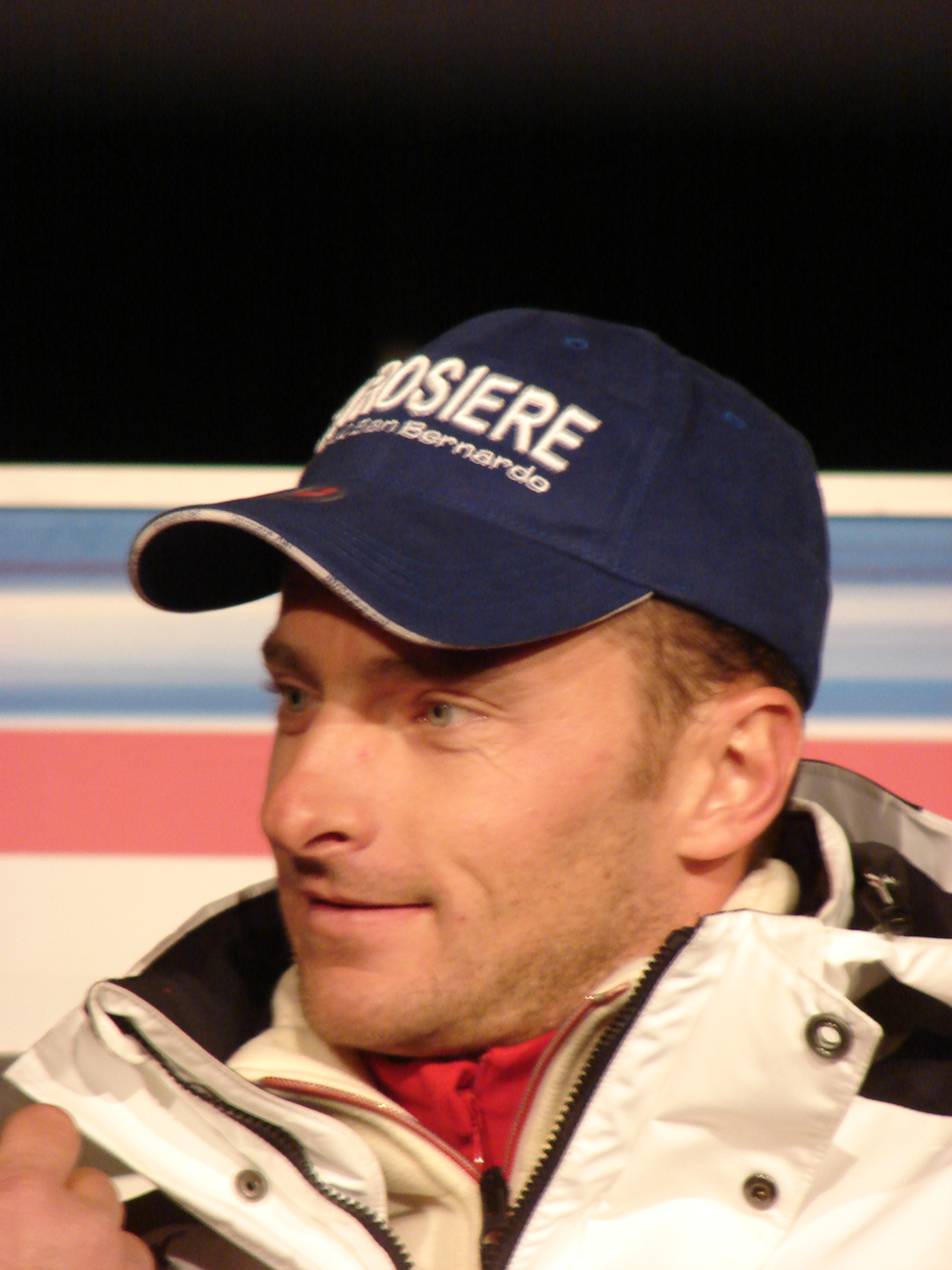
- Chenal in 2006

Personal information
- Born: 10 October 1973 (age 52) Moûtiers, France
Medal record
Men's alpine skiing
Representing France
Olympic Games
Silver medal – second place	2006 Turin	Giant slalom

Joël Chenal (born 10 October 1973 in Moûtiers) is a French alpine skier, currently prohibited to practice after being accused of sexual assault.

Chenal won a silver medal in the giant slalom at the 2006 Winter Olympics in Turin. His other notable successes are first place in Alta Badia (19 December 1999), second place in Yongpyong (26 February 2000) and third place in Kranjska Gora (8 March 2000), all of them in giant slalom.

In 2025, he was accused of sexually assaulting minors, taking advantage of his status as a champion to approach vulnerable young girls.

== World cup victories ==
Date	Location	Race
19 December 1999	(Italy) Alta Badia	Giant slalom
