= Didier Plaschy =

Swiss alpine skier (born 1973)

Didier Plaschy (born 2 May 1973) is a Swiss former alpine skier who competed in the 1998 Winter Olympics, finishing 12th in the men's slalom.
