= Olesya Aliyeva =

Russian alpine skier (born 1977)

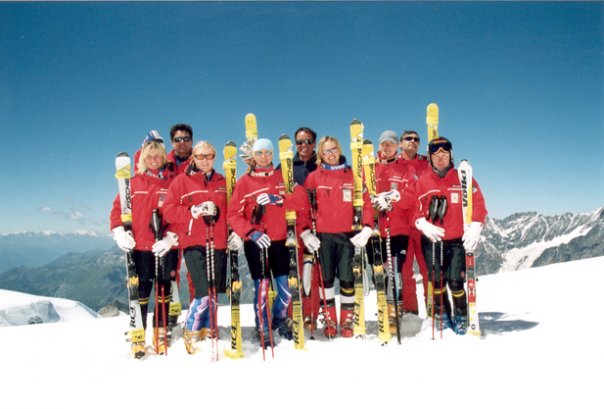

Olesya Murtazaliyevna Aliyeva (born 17 August 1977) is a Russian former alpine skier who competed in the 1998 Winter Olympics and 2006 Winter Olympics.
