= Sibylle Brauner =

German alpine skier (born 1975)

Sibylle Brauner (born 16 March 1975 in Raubling) is a retired German alpine skier who competed in the 2002 Winter Olympics.
