= Corina Grünenfelder =

Swiss alpine skier (born 1975)

Corina Grünenfelder (born 29 December 1975 in Elm, Switzerland) is a Swiss former alpine skier who competed in the 2002 Winter Olympics.
