= Lea Dabič =

Slovenian alpine skier (born 1981)

Lea Dabič (born 10 June 1981 in Bohinjska Bistrica) is a retired Slovenian alpine skier who competed in the women's slalom at the 2002 Winter Olympics.
