= Sonja Nef =

Swiss alpine skier

Personal information
- Born: 19 April 1972 (age 54) Heiden, Switzerland
- Height: 1.64 m (5 ft 5 in)

Skiing career
- Sport: Alpine skiing
- Club: SC Grub-Eggersriet
- Retired: 21 February 2006 (age 33)
- Disciplines: Giant slalom, Slalom
- World Cup debut: 20 March 1993 (age 20)

Olympics
- Teams: 2 – (1998, 2002)
- Medals: 1 (0 gold)

World Championships
- Teams: 6 – (1996–2005)
- Medals: 1 (1 gold)

World Cup
- Seasons: 14 – (1993–2006)
- Wins: 15 – (13 GS, 2 SL)
- Podiums: 32 – (24 GS, 8 SL)
- Overall titles: 0 – (3rd in 2002)
- Discipline titles: 2 – (GS: 2001, 2002)
Medal record
Women's alpine skiing
Representing Switzerland
World Cup race podiums
| Event | 1st | 2nd | 3rd |
|---|---|---|---|
| Slalom | 2 | 3 | 3 |
| Giant slalom | 13 | 6 | 5 |
| Total | 15 | 9 | 8 |
Olympic Games
| Bronze medal – third place | 2002 Salt Lake City | Giant slalom |
World Championships
| Gold medal – first place | 2001 St. Anton | Giant slalom |

Sonja Nef (born 19 April 1972) is a Swiss former alpine skier. Nef was women's World Champion in giant slalom in 2001. She won the 2001 and 2002 World Cup in Giant slalom. At the 2002 Winter Olympics, she finished third in giant slalom.

== Career ==
The injury made itself felt in the following winter of 2003/04 in a declining level of performance. Although Nef was able to achieve a podium finish in the slalom for the last time, further good results became rarer. This trend continued in the winter of 2004/05. Her best placings were two fifth places. In the 2005/06 season, an inflammation of her hip gave her a hard time. Nef was never ranked better than 20th and was unable to qualify for the 2006 Winter Olympics.

== World Cup results ==
=== Season titles ===
- 2 titles – (2 GS)

| Season | Discipline |
|---|---|
| 2001 | Giant slalom |
| 2002 | Giant slalom |

=== Season standings ===
| Season | Age | Overall | Slalom | Giant slalom | Super-G | Downhill | Combined |
|---|---|---|---|---|---|---|---|
| 1995 | 22 | 48 | — | 15 | — | — | — |
| 1996 | 23 | 15 | 11 | 5 | — | — | — |
| 1997 | 24 | 23 | 20 | 13 | — | — | — |
| 1998 | 25 | 16 | 26 | 4 | — | — | — |
| 1999 | 26 | 15 | 21 | 4 | — | — | — |
| 2000 | 27 | 6 | 14 | 2 | — | — | — |
| 2001 | 28 | 4 | 2 | 1 | — | — | — |
| 2002 | 29 | 3 | 4 | 1 | — | — | — |
| 2003 | 30 | 13 | 14 | 5 | — | — | — |
| 2004 | 31 | 29 | 19 | 16 | — | — | — |
| 2005 | 32 | 24 | 14 | 17 | — | — | — |
| 2006 | 33 | 82 | 38 | 38 | — | — | — |

=== Race podiums ===
- 15 wins – (13 GS, 2 SL)
- 32 podiums – (24 GS, 8 SL)

| Season | Date | Location | Discipline | Place |
|---|---|---|---|---|
| 1996 | 6 Jan 1996 | Maribor, Slovenia | Giant slalom | 2nd |
| 1996 | 26 Jan 1996 | Sestriere, Italy | Slalom | 1st |
| 1997 | 26 Jan 1997 | Cortina d’Ampezzo, Italy | Giant slalom | 3rd |
| 1998 | 28 Jan 1998 | Åre, Sweden | Giant slalom | 2nd |
| 1999 | 02 Jan 1999 | Maribor, Slovenia | Giant slalom | 2nd |
| 1999 | 24 Feb 1999 | Åre, Sweden | Giant slalom | 3rd |
| 2000 | 31 Oct 1999 | Tignes, France | Giant slalom | 1st |
| 2000 | 5 Jan 2000 | Maribor, Slovenia | Giant slalom | 2nd |
| 2000 | 17 Feb 2000 | Åre, Sweden | Giant slalom | 1st |
| 2000 | 11 Mar 2000 | Sestriere, Italy | Giant slalom | 1st |
| 2001 | 16 Nov 2000 | (United States) Park City, USA | Giant slalom | 1st |
| 2001 | 9 Dec 2000 | Sestriere, Italy | Giant slalom | 3rd |
| 2001 | 19 Dec 2000 | Sestriere, Italy | Giant slalom | 1st |
| 2001 | 28 Dec 2000 | Semmering, Austria | Slalom | 2nd |
| 2001 | 30 Dec 2000 | Semmering, Austria | Giant slalom | 1st |
| 2001 | 6 Jan 2001 | Maribor, Slovenia | Giant slalom | 1st |
| 2001 | 21 Jan 2001 | Cortina d’Ampezzo, Italy | Giant slalom | 1st |
| 2001 | 26 Jan 2001 | Ofterschwang, Germany | Slalom | 3rd |
| 2001 | 10 Mar 2001 | Åre, Sweden | Slalom | 1st |
| 2001 | 11 Mar 2001 | Åre, Sweden | Giant slalom | 1st |
| 2002 | 27 Oct 2001 | Sölden, Austria | Giant slalom | 2nd |
| 2002 | 21 Nov 2001 | (United States) Copper Mountain, USA | Giant slalom | 3rd |
| 2002 | 9 Dec 2001 | Sestriere, Italy | Slalom | 3rd |
| 2002 | 16 Dec 2001 | Val-d’Isère, France | Giant slalom | 1st |
| 2002 | 4 Jan 2002 | Maribor, Slovenia | Giant slalom | 1st |
| 2002 | 6 Jan 2002 | Maribor, Slovenia | Slalom | 3rd |
| 2002 | 13 Jan 2002 | Saalbach, Austria | Slalom | 2nd |
| 2002 | 31 Feb 2002 | Åre, Sweden | Giant slalom | 3rd |
| 2002 | 9 Mar 2002 | Altenmarkt, Austria | Giant slalom | 1st |
| 2003 | 12 Dec 2002 | Val-d’Isère, France | Giant slalom | 2nd |
| 2003 | 4 Jan 2003 | Bormio, Italy | Giant slalom | 1st |
| 2004 | 29 Nov 2003 | (United States) Park City, USA | Slalom | 2nd |

== Olympic results ==
| Year | Age | Slalom | Giant Slalom | Super-G | Downhill | Combined |
|---|---|---|---|---|---|---|
| 1998 | 25 | DNF1 | DNF1 | — | — | — |
| 2002 | 29 | DNF2 | 3 | — | — | — |

== World Championship results ==
| Year | Age | Slalom | Giant Slalom | Super-G | Downhill | Combined |
|---|---|---|---|---|---|---|
| 1996 | 23 | DNF1 | DNF2 | — | — | — |
| 1997 | 24 | DNF1 | 8 | — | — | — |
| 1999 | 26 | DNF2 | 11 | — | — | — |
| 2001 | 28 | 7 | 1 | — | — | — |
| 2003 | 30 | 6 | 8 | — | — | — |
| 2005 | 32 | DNF1 | DNF2 | — | — | — |

Awards
| Preceded by (Switzerland) Brigitte McMahon | Swiss Sportswoman of the Year; 2001 | Succeeded by (Switzerland) Natascha Badmann |
