= Jonna Mendes =

American alpine skier

Personal information
- Born: March 21, 1979 (age 47) Santa Cruz, California
- Height: 5 ft 9 in (1.75 m)

Skiing career
- Sport: Alpine skiing
- Club: Heavenly Ski & Snowboard Fnd
- Retired: May 2006 (age 27)
- Disciplines: Downhill, super-G
- World Cup debut: March 7, 1997 (age 17)

Olympics
- Teams: 2 – (1998, 2002)
- Medals: 0

World Championships
- Teams: 4 – (1999–2005)
- Medals: 1 (0 gold)

World Cup
- Seasons: 9 – (1998–2006)
- Podiums: 0
- Overall titles: 0 – (25th in 2003)
- Discipline titles: 0 – (13th in SG, 2003)
Medal record
Women's alpine skiing
Representing the United States
World Championships
Bronze medal – third place	2003 St. Moritz	Super G
Junior World Ski Championships
Silver medal – second place	1999 Pra-Loup	Downhill
Silver medal – second place	1998 Megève	Downhill

Jonna Mendes (born March 31, 1979) is a former World Cup alpine ski racer from the United States. She specialized in the speed events and raced for nine seasons on the World Cup circuit. Mendes competed in two Winter Olympics and four World Championships. She was the bronze medalist in the Super G at the 2003 World Championships in St. Moritz, Switzerland.

Born in Santa Cruz on the California coast, Mendes began skiing at age four when her family moved to the Lake Tahoe area in the Sierra Nevada mountains. She made her World Cup debut in March 1997 and retired from international competition in May 2006.

Mendes won four U.S. titles: two in giant slalom (2001, 2002) and two in downhill (2004, 2005). The first came at The Big Mountain in Whitefish, Montana, but was followed by a broken foot the next day, incurred in a crash near the end of her second run in the slalom. She repeated the next year at Squaw Valley,. She won her first downhill title at Alyeska in Alaska, and won again at Mammoth, in California, the following year.

== After racing ==
Mendes attended college in New York City and dedicated her time to working with the U.S. Ski Team's national alpine development system. In 2008, she was the recipient of U.S. Ski Team's Russell Wilder award, which is given annually to recognize the most outstanding effort in focusing the interests of American youth on the sports of skiing or snowboarding. In 2011, Mendes moved to Sun Valley, Idaho to help found the new Sun Valley Ski Academy. Under her leadership, eleven student-athletes have been named to US National Alpine, Nordic, Para Alpine, and Snowboard Teams. In recognition for her service to the local ski racing community, Mendes was named to the 2023 Sun Valley Winter Sports Hall of Fame.

== World Cup results ==
=== Top ten finishes ===
- 5 Downhill, 5 Super G

Season	Date	Location	Discipline	Place
2001	Nov 30, 2000	Lake Louise, Canada	Downhill	10th
2001	Dec 1, 2000	Lake Louise, Canada	Downhill	6th
2002	Dec 1, 2001	Lake Louise, Canada	Super-G	10th
2003	Nov 29, 2002	Aspen, USA	Super G	10th
2003	Dec 6, 2002	Lake Louise, Canada	Downhill	9th
2003	Dec 8, 2002	Lake Louise, Canada	Super G	9th
2003	Jan 17, 2003	Cortina d'Ampezzo, Italy	Super G	8th
2003	Jan 18, 2003	Cortina d'Ampezzo, Italy	Downhill	5th
2003	Feb 28, 2003	Innsbruck, Austria	Super G	8th
2004	Dec 20, 2003	St. Moritz, Switzerland	Downhill	5th

=== Season standings ===
Season	Age	Overall	Slalom	Giant Slalom	Super G	Downhill	Combined
1998	18	105	—	—	47	—	—
1999	19	77	—	—	42	40	—
2000	20	65	—	—	44	28	13
2001	21	37	—	—	29	17	—
2002	22	67	—	—	24	29	—
2003	23	25	—	53	13	16	—
2004	24	64	—	—	50	23	—
2005	25	64	—	—	35	26	—
2006	26	100	—	—	58	50	—

== World Championship results ==
Year	Age	Slalom	Giant Slalom	Super G	Downhill	Combined
1999	19	—	—	26	25	9
2001	21	—	—	18	20	9
2003	23	—	—	3	6	—
2005	25	—	—	—	12	—

== Olympic results ==
Year	Age	Slalom	Giant Slalom	Super G	Downhill	Combined
1998	18	—	—	32	17	14
2002	22	—	—	16	11	—
