= Corinne Imlig =

Swiss alpine skier (born 1979)

Corinne Imlig (born 7 September 1979) is a Swiss former alpine skier who competed in the Women's World Cup in 2003.
