= Anne-Marie LeFrançois =

Canadian alpine skier (born 1977)

Anne-Marie LeFrançois (born 8 January 1977) is a Canadian former alpine skier who competed in the 2002 Winter Olympics.
