= Sara-Maude Boucher =

Canadian alpine skier (born 1979)

Sara-Maude Boucher (born 10 March 1979) is a Canadian former alpine skier who competed in the 2002 Winter Olympics.
