= Trine Bakke =

Norwegian alpine skier

Personal information
- Born: 11 January 1975 (age 51) Trondheim
Medal record
Women's alpine skiing
Representing Norway
World Championships
Bronze medal – third place	1999 Vail/Beaver Creek	Slalom

Trine Bakke (born 11 January 1975 in Trondheim) is a retired Norwegian alpine skier. By the end of her career, she had won two World cup competitions in slalom (St. Anton 1999 and Maribor, 2000). The highlight in her career came at the WC 1999 in Vail where she won the bronze medal in slalom behind Zali Steggall and Pernilla Wiberg.

Bakke competed in alpine skiing for Norway at the 1994, 1998, and 2002 Winter Olympics.
