= Susanne Ekman =

Swedish alpine skier (born 1978)

Susanne Ekman (born 4 December 1978) is a Swedish former alpine skier who competed in the women's slalom at the 2002 Winter Olympics, finishing 22nd.
