= Andrine Flemmen =

Norwegian alpine skier (born 1974)

Medal record

Women's alpine skiing

World Championships
Silver medal – second place	1999 Vail	Giant slalom

Andrine Flemmen (born 29 December 1974 in Molde) is a retired Norwegian alpine skier. Her favourite discipline was giant slalom. In this discipline she won three World Cup races. Her career highlight was a silver medal at the WC 1999 in Vail, with gold going to the Austrian Alexandra Meissnitzer.

== World Cup victories ==
Date	Location	Race
24 October 1998	(Austria) Sölden	Giant slalom
21 November 2001	(United States) Copper Mountain	Giant slalom
26 October 2002	(Austria) Sölden	Giant slalom
