= Carolina Ruiz =

Spanish alpine skier

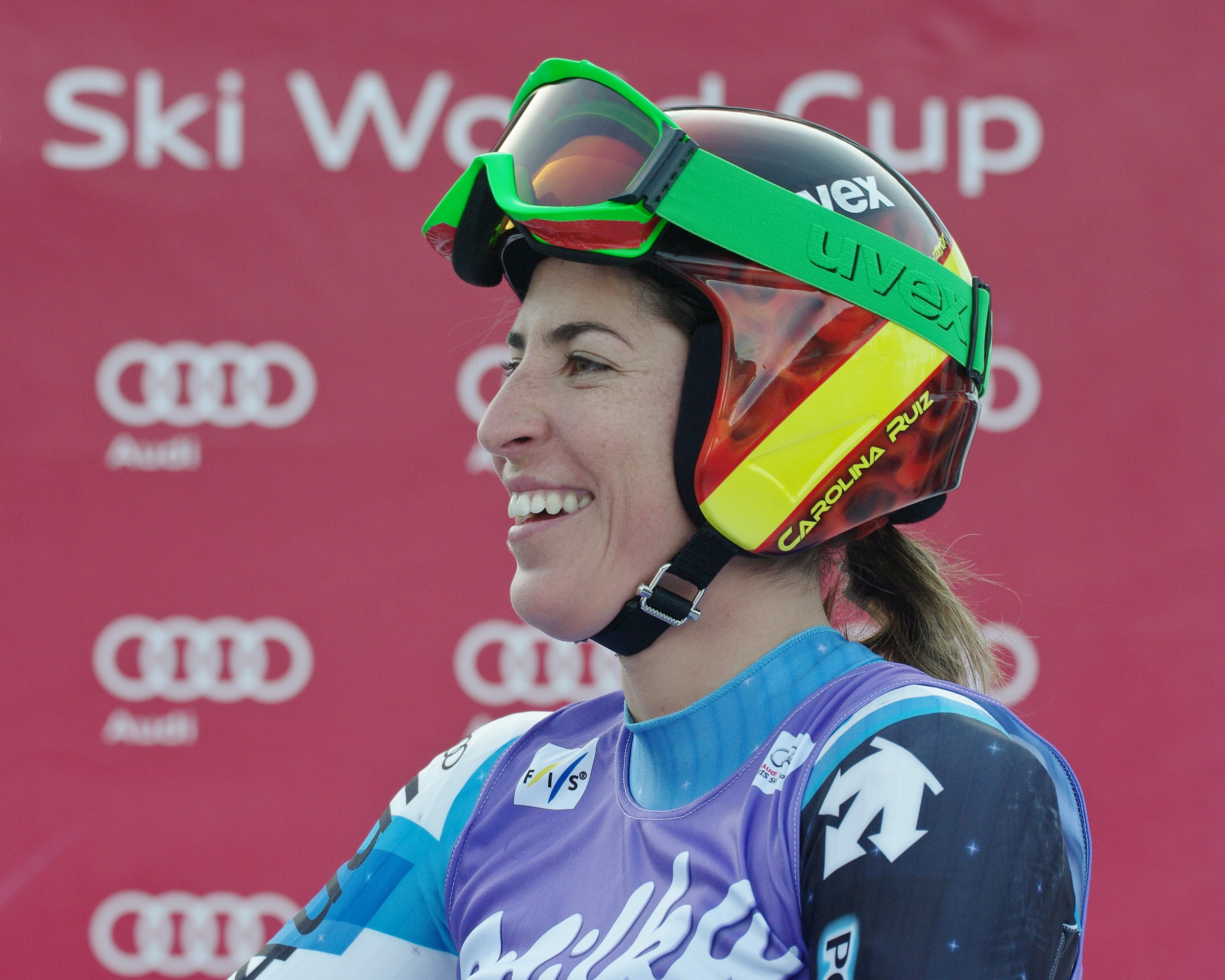
- Ruiz Castillo in 2011

Personal information
- Full name: Carolina Ruiz Castillo
- Born: 14 October 1981 (age 44) Osorno, Chile
- Height: 165 cm (5 ft 5 in)
- Website: carolinaruiz.com

Skiing career
- Sport: Alpine skiing
- Retired: 31 March 2015 (age 33)
- Disciplines: Downhill, super-G, giant slalom
- World Cup debut: 24 October 1998 (age 17)

Olympics
- Teams: 3 – (2002, 2006, 2010)
- Medals: 0

World Championships
- Teams: 8 – (1999–2013)
- Medals: 0

World Cup
- Seasons: 16 – (2000–2015)
- Wins: 1 – (1 DH)
- Podiums: 2 – (1 DH, 1 GS)
- Overall titles: 0 – (22nd in 2013)
- Discipline titles: 0 – (11th in SG, 2013)
Medal record
Women's alpine skiing
Representing Spain
Junior World Ski Championships
Silver medal – second place	2000 Quebec	Giant slalom
Bronze medal – third place	2001 Verbier	Giant slalom

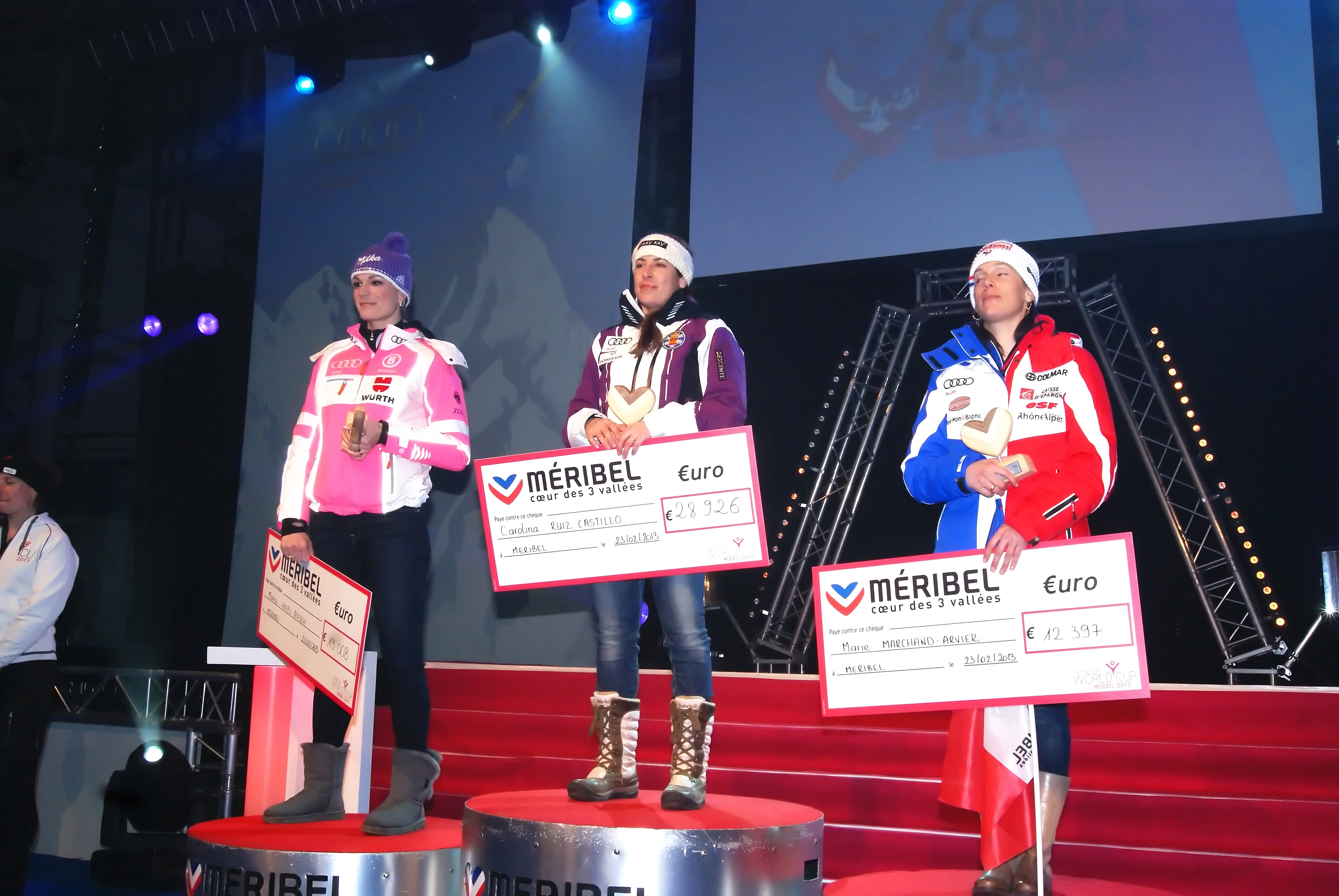
Ruiz Castillo on the podium at Méribel in 2013

Carolina Verónica Ruiz Castillo (born 14 October 1981) is a retired World Cup alpine ski racer from Spain. Born in Osorno, Chile, she represented Spain in four Winter Olympics and eight World Championships. She moved to Spain with her parents few weeks after she was born, specifically to Sierra Nevada (Granada). She also competed in the European cup and the junior world championships, where she won two medals.

Ruiz secured her first World Cup victory in 2013, a downhill at Méribel, France. It was the first-ever victory in a World Cup speed event for Spain and the second career podium for Ruiz Castillo at age 31; her first was thirteen years earlier in a giant slalom.

== World Cup results ==
=== Top ten finishes ===
- 1 win – (1 DH)
- 2 podiums – (1 DH, 1 GS)
- 14 top tens – (9 DH, 4 SG, 1 GS)

Season	Date	Location	Discipline	Place
2000	11 Mar 2000	Sestriere, Italy	Giant slalom	2nd
2008	8 Dec 2007	Aspen, USA	Downhill	7th
2008	20 Jan 2008	Cortina d'Ampezzo, Italy	Super G	8th
2008	22 Feb 2008	Whistler, Canada	Downhill	10th
2009	24 Jan 2009	Cortina d'Ampezzo, Italy	Downhill	7th
2011	8 Mar 2011	Tarvisio, Italy	Super G	9th
2013	19 Jan 2013	Cortina d'Ampezzo, Italy	Downhill	10th
2013	20 Jan 2013	Cortina d'Ampezzo, Italy	Super G	4th
2013	23 Feb 2013	Méribel, France	Downhill	1st
2013	1 Mar 2013	Garmisch, Germany	Super G	6th

=== Season standings ===
Season	Age	Overall	Slalom	Giant slalom	Super G	Downhill	Combined
2000	18	71	–	24	—	—	—
2001	19	74	–	39	34	—	—
2002	20	104	–	–	36	—	—
2003	21	100	–	51	47	—	—
2004	22	120	—	—	—	—	—
2005	23	82	–	–	40	—	—
2006	24	100	–	–	44	—	—
2007	25	58	–	54	28	32	—
2008	26	35	–	45	20	19	—
2009	27	59	–	–	28	28	48
2010	28	86	–	–	39	38	—
2011	29	55	–	–	22	33	—
2012	30	63	–	–	26	32	—
2013	31	22	–	36	11	15	—
2014	32	48	—	—	35	23	—
2015	33	36	—	—	30	17	—

Standings through 4 Nov 2015

== Olympic results ==
Season	Date	Location	Discipline	Place
2002	17 Feb 2002	(United States) Salt Lake City, USA	Super-G	15th
2002	20 Feb 2002	(United States) Salt Lake City, USA	Slalom	26th
2002	22 Feb 2002	(United States) Salt Lake City, USA	Giant slalom	DNF1
2006	15 Feb 2006	Turin, Italy	Downhill	30th
2006	18 Feb 2006	Turin, Italy	Combined	25th
2006	20 Feb 2006	Turin, Italy	Super-G	30th
2006	24 Feb 2006	Turin, Italy	Giant slalom	20th
2010	17 Feb 2010	Vancouver, Canada	Downhill	15th
2010	20 Feb 2010	Vancouver, Canada	Super-G	18th
2010	25 Feb 2010	Vancouver, Canada	Giant slalom	34th
2014	12 Feb 2014	(Russia) Sochi, Rusia	Downhill	DNF
2014	15 Feb 2014	(Russia) Sochi, Rusia	Super-G	DNF
