= Marlies Oester =

Swiss alpine skier (born 1976)

Marlies Oester (born 22 August 1976 in Adelboden) is a Swiss former alpine skier who competed in the 2002 Winter Olympics.
