= Špela Pretnar =

Slovenian former alpine skier (born 1973)

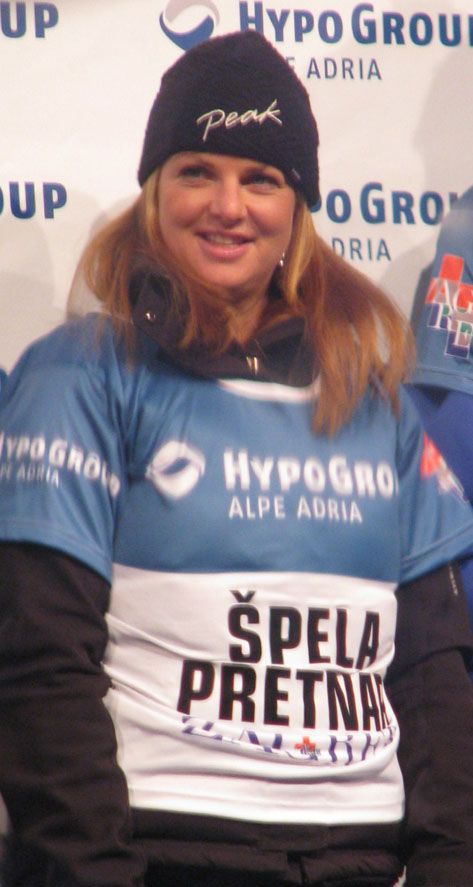

Personal information
- Born: 5 March 1973 (age 53) Bled, SR Slovenia, SFR Yugoslavia

Skiing career
- Sport: Alpine skiing
- Retired: 27 March 2004
- Disciplines: Slalom, giant slalom
- World Cup debut: 27 January 1992

Olympics
- Medals: 0 (0 gold)

World Championships
- Medals: 0 (0 gold)

World Cup
- Seasons: 12
- Wins: 6
- Podiums: 13
- Overall titles: 0
- Discipline titles: 1

Špela Pretnar (born 5 March 1973) is a Slovenian former alpine skier.

In her career, Pretnar won six races in Alpine Skiing World Cup races, with 13 podiums altogether. In the 1999–2000 season, she won a small crystal globe in slalom. Pretnar was named Slovenian sportswoman of the year in 2000. Pretnar represented Slovenia at the 2002 Winter Olympics.

Pretnar was a sports reporter at a Slovenian commercial TV station POP TV. She has a son named Mak Rebolj (born October 2010).

== World Cup results ==
=== Season titles ===
Season	Discipline
2000	Slalom

=== Season standings ===
Season	Age	Overall	Slalom	Giant slalom	Super-G	Downhill	Combined
1992	18	99	—	39	—	—	—
1993	19	55	45	25	51	—	15
1994	20	15	22	15	27	35	9
1995	21	7	11	3	15	—	6
1996	22						
1997	23	48	38	18	—	—	—
1998	24	19	10	18	—	—	—
1999	25	19	7	13	—	—	—
2000	26	7	1	33	—	—	—
2001	27	36	13	44	—	—	—
2002	28	49	18	43	—	—	—
2003	29	65	25	56	—	—	—

=== Race podiums ===
- 6 wins – (5 SL, 1 GS)
- 13 podiums – (9 SL, 3 GS, 1 SG)

Season	Date	Location	Discipline	Position
1995	10 January 1995	Flachau, Austria	Super-G	3rd
1995	23 January 1995	Cortina d'Ampezzo, Italy	Giant slalom	3rd
1995	25 February 1995	Maribor, Slovenia	Giant slalom	2nd
1995	18 March 1995	Bormio, Italy	Giant slalom	1st
1998	5 January 1998	Bormio, Italy	Slalom	3rd
1998	11 January 1998	Bormio, Italy	Slalom	3rd
1999	23 February 1999	Åre, Sweden	Slalom	1st
2000	20 November 1999	Copper Mountain, United States	Slalom	1st
2000	6 January 2000	Maribor, Slovenia	Slalom	2nd
2000	9 January 2000	Berchtesgaden, Germany	Slalom	1st
2000	12 February 2000	Santa Caterina, Italy	Slalom	1st
2000	20 February 2000	Åre, Sweden	Slalom	1st
2000	10 March 2000	Sestriere, Italy	Slalom	3rd
