= Kristina Koznick =

American alpine skier (born 1975)

Personal information
- Born: November 24, 1975 (age 50) Apple Valley, Minnesota, U.S.
- Height: 5 ft 7 in (1.70 m)
- Website: koznick.com

Skiing career
- Sport: Alpine skiing
- Club: Buck Hill Ski Racing
- Retired: July 2006 (age 30)
- Disciplines: Slalom, giant slalom
- World Cup debut: January 24, 1993 (age 17)

Olympics
- Teams: 3 - (1998, 2002, 2006)
- Medals: 0

World Championships
- Teams: 6 - (1996–2005)
- Medals: 0

World Cup
- Seasons: 12 - (1995–2006)
- Wins: 6 - (6 SL)
- Podiums: 20 - (20 SL)
- Overall titles: 0 - (8th in 2002)
- Discipline titles: 0 - (2nd in SL, 1998, 2002)

Kristina Lyn Koznick (born November 24, 1975) is a former World Cup alpine ski racer from the United States. She raced in the technical events and specialized in slalom.

== Racing career ==
Born in Apple Valley, Minnesota, Koznick learned to ski and race at the modest Buck Hill ski area in her hometown of Burnsville, a suburb south of Minneapolis.

Koznick has six World Cup victories, 20 podiums (all in slalom), and 55 top ten finishes (4 in giant slalom, 51 in slalom). She was the runner-up in the slalom season standings twice (1998, 2002), and her best overall World Cup placing was 8th in the 2002 season.

Koznick competed in three Winter Olympics (1998–2006) Her last World Cup race was in February 2006, prior to the 2006 Winter Olympics in Torino, her last international event.

Following the 2000 World Cup season, a 24-year-old Koznick left the U.S. Ski Team and raced for the United States as an independent for the next six seasons, until her retirement. This set a precedent, as Bode Miller would later follow in her footsteps as an independent for two seasons in 2008 and 2009. In 2015, she was inducted into the National Polish-American Sports Hall of Fame.

== After racing ==
After retiring from international competition in July 2006, Koznick started her ski business in Vail and became a broadcaster for NBC Sports. She made her debut that December, handling post-race interviews for alpine skiing events. Her most recent appearance on the network was in December 2008, covering the men's World Cup races in Beaver Creek, Colorado. Kozlack is also a certified massage therapist, focused on neuromuscular programming.

=== Personal life ===
Koznick now has a family and plays for the Vail Breakaways, a women's hockey team in Vail, Colorado.

== World Cup results ==
=== Race victories ===
- 6 wins (6 SL)
- 20 podiums (20 SL)

Season	Date	Location	Discipline
1998	29 Jan 1998	Åre, Sweden	Slalom
1999	28 Dec 1998	Semmering, Austria	Slalom
2000	10 Mar 2000	Sestriere, Italy	Slalom
2000	19 Mar 2000	Bormio, Italy	Slalom
2002	20 Jan 2002	Berchtesgaden, Germany	Slalom
2003	15 Mar 2003	Lillehammer, Norway	Slalom

=== Season standings ===
Season	Age	Overall	Slalom	Giant slalom	Super G	Downhill	Combined
1993	17	87	41	—	—	—	—
1994	18						
1995	19	75	26	—	—	—	—
1996	20	80	40	—	—	—	—
1997	21	80	35	—	—	—	—
1998	22	11	2	—	—	—	—
1999	23	36	6	—	—	—	—
2000	24	19	5	29	—	—	—
2001	25	7	7	26	—	—	—
2002	26	8	2	22	—	—	—
2003	27	27	11	30	—	—	—
2004	28	21	8	27	—	—	—
2005	29	15	4	23	—	—	—
2006	30	31	13	28	—	—	—
