= Christel Pascal =

French alpine skier (born 1973)

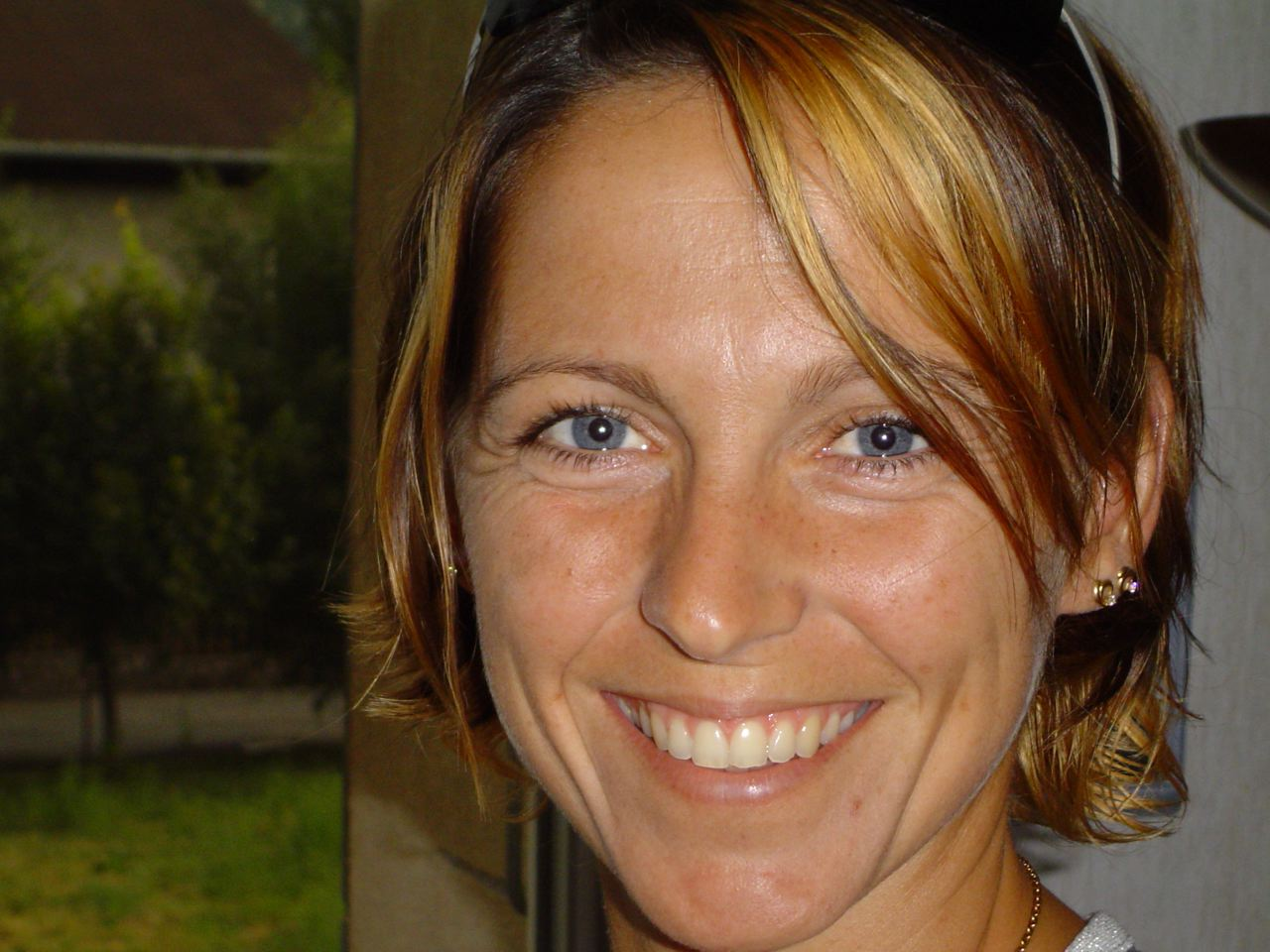
Christel Pascal

Christel Pascal (born 6 October 1973 in Gap, Hautes-Alpes) is a French former alpine skier who competed in the 2002 Winter Olympics.
