= Mojca Suhadolc =

Slovenian alpine skier (born 1975)

Mojca Suhadolc (born 7 January 1975 in Vrhnika, SR Slovenia, SFR Yugoslavia) is a Slovenian former alpine skier.

Suhadolc competed in FIS World Cup in years 1992-2005. She won one race, in Super G, in Lake Louise (Canada) in 1999. In 1999/2000 season, she finished third in Super G final standings. Besides, she won 4 podiums at World Cup races.

Suhadolc represented Slovenia at the 1998 and 2002 Winter Olympics.

== World Cup results ==
=== Season standings ===
Season	Age	Overall	Slalom	Giant slalom	Super-G	Downhill	Combined
1993	17	60	—	49	25	38	—
1994	18						
1995	19	53	—	28	35	37	—
1996	20	19	—	10	16	18	—
1997	21	59	—	36	30	34	—
1998	22	53	—	45	19	26	—
1999	23	48	—	51	22	23	—
2000	24	16	—	30	3	19	—
2001	25	18	—	28	8	18	—
2002	26	64	—	—	29	26	—
2003	27	43	—	—	16	24	—
2004	28	94	—	58	35	52	—
2005	29	96	—	—	46	—	—

=== Race podiums ===
Season	Date	Location	Discipline	Position
1996	7 December 1995	Val d'Isere, France	Super-G	3rd
1996	8 December 1995	Val d'Isere, France	Giant slalom	2nd
2000	28 November 1999	Lake Louise, Canada	Super-G	1st
2000	22 January 2000	Cortina d'Ampezzo, Italy	Downhill	3rd
2000	27 February 2000	Innsbruck, Austria	Super-G	3rd
