= Catherine Borghi =

Swiss alpine skier (born 1976)

Catherine Borghi (born 23 September 1976 in Les Diablerets) is a Swiss former alpine skier who competed in the 1998 Winter Olympics and 2002 Winter Olympics.
