= Corinne Rey-Bellet =

Swiss alpine skier (1972–2006)

- Rey-Bellet, pictured 2003

Personal information
- Born: 2 August 1972 Les Crosets, Valais, Switzerland
- Died: 30 April 2006 (aged 33) Les Crosets, Valais, Switzerland
- Height: 163 cm (5 ft 4 in)
- Weight: 62 kg (137 lb)
- Spouse: Gerold Stadler (m. 2002)
- Children: 1
- Website: rey-bellet.com

Skiing career
- Sport: Alpine skiing ♀
- Retired: 2003
- Disciplines: Downhill, super-G, giant slalom
- World Cup debut: 1992

World Championships
- Medals: 1

World Cup
- Wins: 5
Medal record
Women's alpine skiing
Representing Switzerland
World Championships
| Silver medal – second place | 2003 St. Moritz | Downhill |

Corinne Rey-Bellet (2 August 1972 – 30 April 2006) was a Swiss alpine skier. Rey-Bellet shared a World Championship silver medal in the downhill event in St. Moritz in 2003 (tying with Alexandra Meissnitzer) and won a total of five World Cup races, three downhill and two super-G. Her double win at St Anton am Arlberg on 16 January 1999 is the first and only double win on the same day in the women's Alpine World Cup. She retired in 2003 due to a series of injuries.

On 30 April 2006, her husband Gerold Stadler murdered her and her brother, shortly after she separated from him. He killed himself two days later. Her murder attracted a significant amount of public attention and resulted in increased political and institutional pressure to fight domestic violence. It also influenced the debate on changing Swiss gun laws; Stadler was a captain in the Swiss Armed Forces, and used his service pistol to murder her. Following her death, gun laws were changed to prohibit the keeping of military ammunition by soldiers at home. In 2021, Rey-Bellet was honored by the Swiss government as part of the Hommage 2021 project to honor women significant to Swiss history.

== Early life ==
Rey-Bellet was born on 2 August 1972 in Les Crosets in Valais, Switzerland, to Adrien "Le Sheriff" Rey-Bellet and Verena Rey-Bellet. She had a brother, Alain, two years her junior. Rey-Bellet was bilingual in French and German as her mother was from German-speaking Basel. Her father's family were locally influential and powerful landowners who at times had harsh conflicts with their neighbors over their wealth.

She grew up skiing, developing an interest in it from her early childhood. She took college classes in Martigny in economics, though attended few in her first year, instead preferring to ski.

== Career ==
Rey-Bellet competed in the downhill, super-G, and the giant slalom. Her first professional skiing competition was in winter 1989 at the giant slalom in Veysonnaz. She won a total of five World Cup races from 1992 to 2003. She placed 17th in the women's giant slalom at the 1992 Winter Olympics. She placed third in the giant slalom race at Crans-Montana in the 1991–92 season, which was her only podium placement until 1999.

Her career was marked by repeated injuries. In 1992, Rey-Bellet injured her shoulder; the following year she tore her meniscus; and in 1996 she tore a cruciate ligament in her right knee after a severe fall. She underwent surgery for the last injury and had to take an eight-month break. Due to previous disappointments, she was at times derisively called "the eternal talent". While previously viewed as having potential and placed under much pressure, called the new Vreni Schneider, the fact she did not win any World Cup races between 1992 and 1996 resulted in disappointment, and she was abandoned by her sponsor.

On 16 January 1999, Rey-Bellet won two races, the downhill and the super-G three hours later in the World Cup at St Anton am Arlberg. She won with a lead of 19 hundredths of a second over the second-place racer Michaela Dorfmeister. This was the first time a woman had won two races on one day in the alpine skiing World Cup, and is the only time to date. The only male skier to have done the same was the Frenchman Luc Alphand in 1995. She dedicated the win to her psychologist, her family, her boyfriend, and to herself.

She had little success in races shortly after this; she said later that year that "I want to win, but that doesn't change my new philosophy. I ski for myself, for my pleasure. I don't owe anything to anyone." In 2000, the Swiss newspaper Le Temps described her as one of the most consistent of the Swiss skiing team. On 15 January 2000, she won the downhill race at Altenmarkt in the 1999–2000 World Cup, beating the next racer, Regina Häusl, by 15 hundredths of a second. At the 2000–01 World Cup, she came second in the giant slalom at Semmering, third at Lake Louise in the downhill and in the Aspen super-G in 2001. She came first place at Åre in the super-G, and reached the podium in three of the other events. On 2 March 2002, she placed first in the World Cup in the downhill race at Lenzerheide.

On 9 February 2003, she won a silver medal in the downhill at the World Skiing Championship in St. Moritz, in the downhill event. She shared the medal with Austrian skier Alexandra Meissnitzer, both tying at 1:34.41 seconds. She retired later that year to start a family, becoming a stay-at-home mother. Her retirement was also due to her knee injuries, as she had developed osteoarthritis.

== Personal life ==
Rey-Bellet underwent kinesiology treatments (an alternative medicine) to help her regain movement in her knee following her 1996 injury, which she believed helped her recovery. While competing, she used alternative medicine treatments, including acupuncture and homeopathy, to treat allergies, to the chagrin of her skiing team's doctors. Following her usage of kinesiology treatments to recover from her injuries, she became passionate about it and began practicing it at home. In 2001, she worked with a naturopath and psychologist, whom she credited with improving her mental health.

In 1998 she was engaged to a man named Martin five years her senior, whom she had known for five years. They were still engaged in January 2001. By October 2001, she was dating Gerold "Gery" Stadler, a private banker for Credit Suisse and captain in the Swiss Armed Forces. They married on 4 May 2002. Stadler was from Abtwil in the Canton of Aargau, and was bilingual. They met as part of a financial monitoring program from Credit Suisse for prominent Swiss athletes. Stadler asked to marry her shortly after they met. Associates of Stadler described him as working "like a madman" and he was highly successful within the company. Stadler disliked her interest in alternative medicine. In 2004, six months after her retirement, they had a son, living together in Abtwil. Rey-Bellet co-founded Mube (mein|unser Beruf Eltern), a local parents' association. She told L'Illustré magazine in 2004 that she had always wanted to be a mother, and said that Stadler was now the main provider.

While she presented to the public and media a very happy marriage, giving several happy interviews, those that knew them thought she was lonely and that they were having marital problems. According to the pastor who married them, she told him that she was attempting to fix their marriage; Stadler refused to speak of it to anyone and kept up "a facade". Another who knew Rey-Bellet said she felt disconnected in German-speaking Switzerland, and that she had told her she wanted to "finally be loved as a woman and a mother, not as a ski champion", and said that Stadler was "very ambitious". Another said that he had used her career for his own advancement. Stadler became physically abusive, which resulted in her needing to be taken to the hospital on several occasions. Stadler's family claimed that he had assaulted her once, after which he had confessed to them and her parents, and that afterwards they had received couples' therapy with Stadler also receiving individual therapy. She became pregnant again after this incident.

== Murder ==
In mid-April 2006, the separation of Rey-Bellet and Stadler was officiated before a St. Gallen lawyer. That month, she moved out of Abtwil and back to Les Crosets with her parents, to "get some perspective" on their relationship. Their son was left with Stadler. Ten days later, on 30 April 2006, Stadler murdered Rey-Bellet in her parents' home.

On 30 April, Stadler brought their son home to Les Crosets and put him to bed upstairs. Afterwards, Stadler and Rey-Bellet went downstairs at 9:30 and had a conversation about their separation. Both of Rey-Bellet's parents were home at the time, as was her brother, Alain. Her father left shortly after the conversation started, to repair a household appliance. Shortly after her father left, Stadler opened fire, killing Rey-Bellet and Alain, and seriously injuring her mother. According to Rey-Bellet's mother, he took his gun out from under a towel and opened fire without saying anything. Her mother was left disabled without use of her arm, having been shot five times. The shootings happened in the middle of the home, above the bar. Rey-Bellet was three months pregnant. Her brother Alain was to be married 5 May.

Stadler used his service pistol, which all Swiss men under the age of 42 are issued, in the killing. Their son was left unharmed. Witnesses saw Stadler leaving with a gun, before he fled the scene by car. A police officer saw him shortly after, resulting in a high speed chase, but he escaped. A warrant was issued for his arrest, resulting in an extensive manhunt. Search dogs were deployed, as was a military helicopter using thermal imaging. His car was recovered in a forest in Huémoz near Ollon in the Vaud canton, 20 kilometres (12 mi) away from the location of the murders, abandoned with an empty magazine inside. Stadler's body was found about 1 kilometre (0.62 mi) away from his car, by a walker on 3 May. He had killed himself using his military service weapon. The crime was found to be premeditated, with Stadler leaving two notes, one addressed to his parents and the other to his employer. In the note to his parents he asked his parents to raise their son. In both notes he stated the crime he was going to commit and why.

== Legacy ==
Rey-Bellet's murder was widely publicized, and attracted a large amount of public and media attention nationally, with many trying to understand what had led to the murder. The media presented it as a crime of passion or an act of madness, in contradiction to the processes that typically lead to family murders. The funeral for Rey-Bellet and her brother took place on 5 May, attended by many members of Europe's skiing fraternity. Many local businesses in the valley closed the day of their funeral.

Rey-Bellet was a celebrity and the murder had happened in what was viewed as a "perfect Swiss family". This resulted in increased political and institutional pressure to fight domestic violence. The case also influenced the debate on changing Swiss gun laws, with a popular initiative for reform forming in the aftermath, particularly spearheaded by the women's magazine Annabelle. The magazine launched a petition, which gained 17,400 signatures, for the removal of military weapons from homes. Switzerland was then noted to have a high rate of family murders, with a contemporary study putting 58% of all murders as family-related, compared to 29% for the Netherlands. At the time, Switzerland had a very high rate of suicide amongst young males, and more familicides than the United States.

After her murder, in 2007, rules were changed banning the storage of military ammunition by soldiers at home instead of in arsenals. The vast majority of Switzerland's soldiers did not keep their ammunition at home prior to this change, with only a few thousand doing so. An additional change was instituted, with soldiers of the army also able to keep their weapons at a central register, instead of guns being mandatory to keep at home. This law change was disputed by anti-gun activists, who argued it was ineffective as it only applied to soldiers, not civilian gun owners. A previous gun debate had resulted from the 2001 Zug massacre, in which 14 people were murdered. Following both the Zug massacre and Rey-Bellet and her brother's murders, in 2011 a referendum was held on instituting stricter firearms laws, which would have entirely banned military weapons from private homes. It failed after it was voted against by 56% of the population.

Her son, orphaned in the shootings, was placed with a related foster family by the authorities of St. Gallen. This followed several high-profile custody controversies between the families on both sides, and following the placement several visitation controversies resulted.

Fifteen years after her murder, the Swiss government honored Rey-Bellet as part of the Hommage 2021 project, which honors women significant to the history of Switzerland. It was created in response to the 50th anniversary of the achievement of women's suffrage in Switzerland. They described her as, in addition to being a champion, "one of too many women victims of domestic violence and femicide in Switzerland. She embodies both female success and the worst injustices suffered by women." As part of the project, a portrait of Rey-Bellet was to be projected onto the exterior of the Berner Kantonalbank and onto the Swiss National Bank in August 2021.
