= Petra Haltmayr =

German alpine skier (born 1975)

Petra Haltmayr (born 16 September 1975 in Rettenberg) is a German former alpine skier who competed in the 2002 Winter Olympics and 2006 Winter Olympics.
