= Karen Putzer =

Italian alpine skier

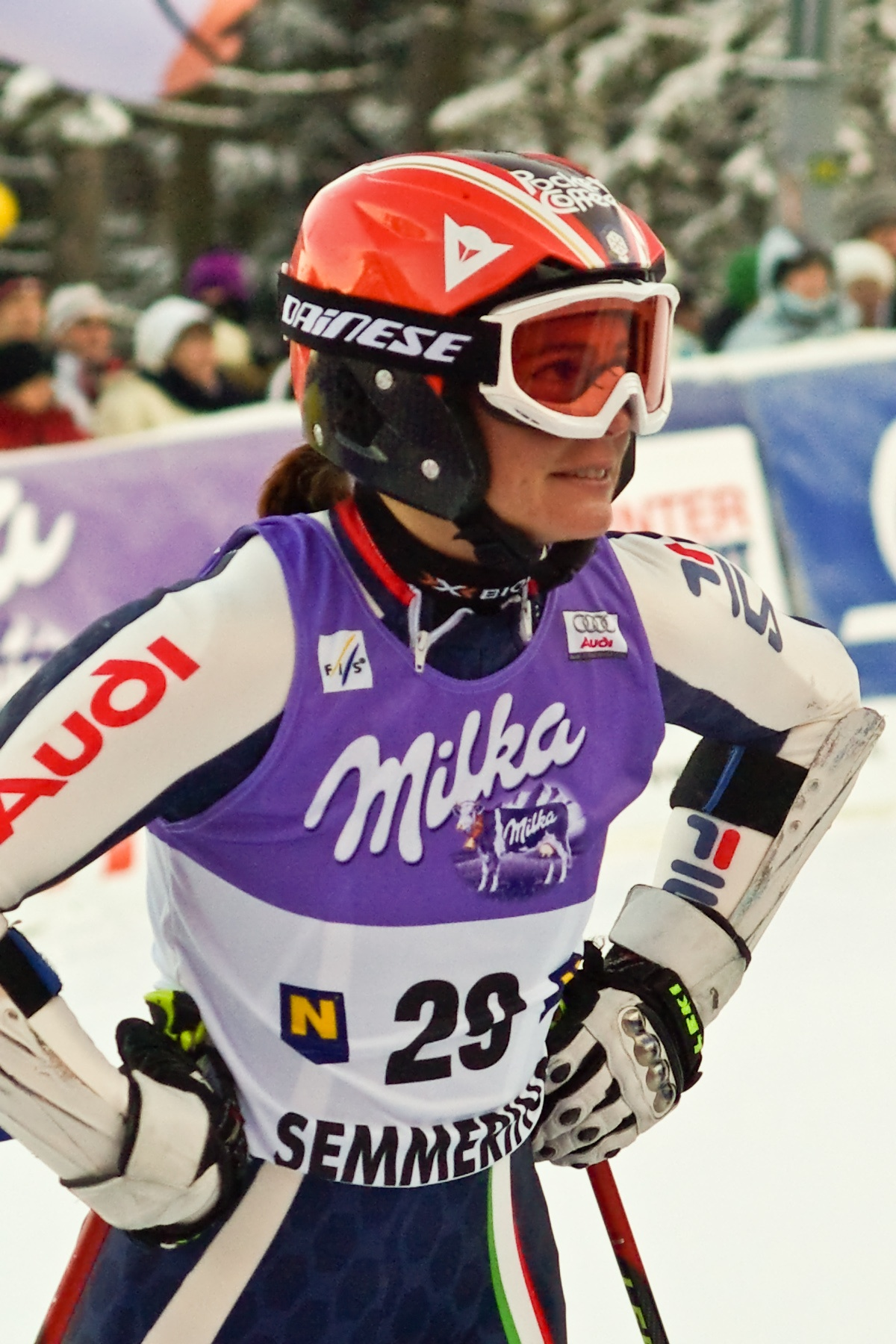
- Karen Putzer competing in Semmering in 2008

Personal information
- Born: 29 September 1978 Bolzano, Italy
- Height: 1.62 m (5 ft 4 in)

Skiing career
- Sport: Alpine skiing
- Club: G.S. Fiamme Oro
- Retired: 2009
- Disciplines: Super-G, giant slalom, downhill, slalom, combined
- World Cup debut: 1995

Olympics
- Medals: 1

World Championships
- Medals: 2

World Cup
- Seasons: 14
- Wins: 8
- Podiums: 16
- Overall titles: 2nd in 2003
- Discipline titles: 2nd in 2003 Giant Slalom, 3rd in 2003 Super-G , 4th in 2003 Combined and 9th in 2003 Downhill
Medal record
International alpine ski competitions
Event	1st	2nd	3rd
Olympic Games	0	0	1
World Championships	0	1	1
Total	0	1	2
World Cup race podiums
Event	1st	2nd	3rd
Giant	4	5	2
Super-G	4	0	1
Total	8	5	3
Olympic Games
Bronze medal – third place	2002 Salt Lake City	Super-G
World Championships
Silver medal – second place	2001 Sankt Anton	Giant slalom
Bronze medal – third place	2001 Sankt Anton	Combined

Karen Putzer (born 29 September 1978) is an Italian former alpine skier.

== Biography ==
She was born in Bolzano, Italy. A specialist of Giant slalom and Super-G, with top rankings in Downhill, Slalom and Combined, she won a total of eight World Cup victories, arriving second in the overall classment in the 2002–2003 season behind Janica Kostelić. She won a bronze medal at the 2002 Winter Olympics at Salt Lake City and a bronze and silver medal at the FIS Alpine World Championships 2001 in Sankt Anton am Arlberg.

== World Cup victories ==
Date	Location	Race
19 December 1999	(Switzerland) Saint Moritz	Super-G
22 December 2001	(Switzerland) Saint Moritz	Super-G
8 December 2002	(Canada) Lake Louise	Super-G
12 December 2002	(France) Val d'Isère	Giant slalom
28 December 2002	(Austria) Semmering	Giant slalom
13 March 2003	(Norway) Lillehammer	Super-G
16 March 2003	(Norway) Lillehammer	Giant slalom
21 January 2007	(Italy) Cortina d'Ampezzo	Giant slalom

== See also ==
- Italian skiers who closed in top 10 in overall World Cup
