= Regina Häusl =

German alpine skier (born 1973)

Regina Häusl (born 17 December 1973 in Bad Reichenhall) is a German former alpine skier who competed in the 1992 Winter Olympics, 1998 Winter Olympics, and 2002 Winter Olympics.
