= Tanja Schneider =

Austrian alpine skier (born 1974)

Tanja Schneider (born 19 February 1974 in Lienz) is an Austrian former alpine skier who competed in the 2002 Winter Olympics.
