= Kirsten Clark =

American alpine skier (born 1977)

Kirsten Lee Clark (born April 23, 1977) is a former World Cup alpine ski racer from the United States. Born in Portland, Maine, she made her World Cup debut in November 1995 and retired from international competition following the 2007 season.

Clark competed for the U.S. in three Winter Olympics (1998, 2002, and 2006) and six World Championships, winning the silver medal in the Super G in 2003.
