= Corviglia (ski course) =

World Cup ski course in Switzerland

- Interactive map of Corviglia
- 46°30′14″N 9°48′04″E
- Location: St. Moritz, Grisons, Switzerland
- Mountain: Piz Nair, Albula Alps
- Opened: 1934
- Level: advanced

Downhill
- Start: 2,840 m (9,318 ft) (AA)
- Finish: 2,040 m (6,693 ft)
- Vertical drop: 800 m (2,625 ft)
- Length: 2,774 m (1.72 mi)
- Max incline: 45 degrees (100%)
- Avg incline: 15.3 degrees (27.4%)
- Min incline: 6.8 degrees (12%)

Super-G
- Start: 2,645 m (8,678 ft) (AA)
- Finish: 2,040 m (6,693 ft)
- Vertical drop: 605 m (1,985 ft)
- Length: 2,196 m (1.36 mi)
- Max incline: 31.4 degrees (61%)
- Avg incline: 15.4 degrees (27.6%)
- Min incline: 6.8 degrees (12%)

Corviglia is a World Cup ski course in Switzerland at St. Moritz, Grisons. Opened 92 years ago in 1934, it is located in the Engadin valley on Piz Nair mountain in the Albula Alps.

Corviglia has hosted a record five World Championships (1934, 1948, 1974, 2003, 2017) and the Winter Olympics in 1948 (concurrent World Championships).

It is adjacent to the newer "Engiadina", a course used for women's speed events, which hosted those events during the two most recent World Championships (2003, 2017).

"Free Fall", a new downhill start constructed in 2003 by Bernhard Russi, has the steepest incline in circuit at 45 degrees (100% gradient).

== Course sections ==
With 45 degrees (100%) at "Frei Fall" (start), this course has the absolute maximum incline in World Cup.

- Frei Fall
- Super-G start
- Martin Berthod Kante (former Suvretta Kante)
- Lanigiro
- Mauritius
- Mauer
- Weißes Band
- Alp Giop
- Romingersprung
- Lärchensprung
- Salastrains (finish area)

== Winter Olympics ==
The descent started at Piz Nair Pitschen in 1948, with the finish area below the Signalbahn mountain station at an elevation of 1,870 meters (6,135 ft) above sea level. From 1948 through 1980, the Winter Olympics were concurrent World Championships for alpine skiing.

=== Men's events ===
Year	Event	Date	Gold	Silver	Bronze
1948	DH	2 February 1948	(France) Henri Oreiller	(Austria) Franz Gabl	(Switzerland) Karl Molitor (Switzerland) Rolf Olinger
1948	KB	2 / 4 February 1948	(France) Henri Oreiller	(Switzerland) Karl Molitor	(France) James Couttet
1948	SL	5 February 1948	(Switzerland) Edy Reinalter	(France) James Couttet	(France) Henri Oreiller

=== Women's events ===
Year	Event	Date	Gold	Silver	Bronze
1948	DH	2 February 1948	(Switzerland) Hedy Schlunegger	(Austria) Trude Beiser	(Austria) Resi Hammerer
1948	KB	2 / 4 February 1948	(Austria) Erika Mahringer	(United States) Gretchen Fraser	(Austria) Erika Mahringer
1948	SL	5 February 1948	(United States) Gretchen Fraser	(Switzerland) Antoinette Meyer	(Austria) Erika Mahringer

== World Championships ==
During its first World Championships in 1934, the downhill's course length was 4.4 km (2.7 mi) for both men and women. The start was at Munt da San Murezzan and the finish line at St. Moritz Bad, which was never used again. An access path had to be cut in the forest.

=== Men's events ===
Event	Type	Date	Gold	Silver	Bronze
1934	DH	15 February 1934	(Switzerland) David Zogg	(Germany) Franz Pfnür	(Italy) Ido Cattaneo (Switzerland) Heinz von Allmen
1934	SL	17 February 1934	(Germany) Franz Pfnür	(Switzerland) David Zogg	(Switzerland) Willi Steuri
1934	KB	15 February 1934; 17 February 1934	(Switzerland) David Zogg	(Germany) Franz Pfnür	(Switzerland) Heinz Von Allmen
1974	GS	5 February 1974	(Italy) Gustav Thöni	(Austria) Hansi Hinterseer	(Italy) Piero Gros
1974	DH	9 February 1974	(Austria) David Zwilling	(Austria) Franz Klammer	(Liechtenstein) Willi Frommelt
1974	SL	10 February 1974	(Italy) Gustav Thöni	(Austria) David Zwilling	(Spain) Francisco Fernández-Ochoa
1974	KB	5 February 1974; 9 February 1974; 10 February 1974	(Austria) Franz Klammer	(Poland) Andrzej Bachleda	(West Germany) Wolfgang Junginger
2003	SG	2 February 2003	(Austria) Stephan Eberharter	(Austria) Hermann Maier	(United States) Bode Miller
2003	KB	6 February 2003	(United States) Bode Miller	(Norway) Lasse Kjus	(Norway) Kjetil André Aamodt
2003	DH	8 February 2003	(Austria) Michael Walchofer	(Norway) Kjetil André Aamodt	(Switzerland) Bruno Kernen
2003	SL	16 February 2003	(Croatia) Ivica Kostelić	(Switzerland) Silvan Zurbriggen	(Italy) Giorgio Rocca
2017	SG	8 February 2017	(Canada) Erik Guay	(Norway) Kjetil Jansrud	(Canada) Manuel Osborne-Paradis
2017	DH	12 February 2017	(Switzerland) Beat Feuz	(Canada) Erik Guay	(Austria) Max Franz
2017	AC	13 February 2017	(Switzerland) Luca Aerni	(Austria) Marcel Hirscher	(Switzerland) Mauro Caviezel
2017	GS	17 February 2017	(Austria) Marcel Hirscher	(Austria) Roland Leitinger	(Norway) Leif Kristian Nestvold-Haugen

=== Women's events ===
Event	Type	Date	Gold	Silver	Bronze
1934	DH	15 February 1934	(Switzerland) Anny Rüegg	(Germany) Christl Cranz	(Germany) Lisa Resch
1934	SL	16 February 1934	(Germany) Christl Cranz	(Germany) Lisa Resch	(Switzerland) Rösli Rominger
1934	KB	15 February 1934; 16 February 1934	(Germany) Christl Cranz	(Germany) Lisa Resch	(Switzerland) Anny Rüegg
1974	GS	3 February 1974	(France) Fabienne Serrat	(West Germany) Traudl Treichl	(France) Jacqueline Rouvier
1974	DH	7 February 1974	(Austria) Annemarie Pröll	(Canada) Betsy Clifford	(Austria) Wiltrud Drexel
1974	SL	8 February 1974	(Liechtenstein) Hanni Wenzel	(France) Michèle Jacot	(Switzerland) Lise-Marie Morerod
1974	KB	3 February 1974; 7 February 1974; 8 February 1974	(France) Fabienne Serrat	(Liechtenstein) Hanni Wenzel	(Austria) Monika Kaserer
2017	AC	10 February 2017	(Switzerland) Wendy Holdener	(United States) Michelle Gisin	(Austria) Michaela Kirchgasser
2017	GS	16 February 2017	(France) Tessa Worley	(United States) Mikaela Shiffrin	(Italy) Sofia Goggia

- Championships from 1954 to 1980, the combined was a "paper race" using the results of the three events (DH, GS, SL).

== World Cup ==
=== Men ===
No.	Type	Season	Date	Winner	Second	Third
95	DH	1970/71	16 January 1971	(Switzerland) Walter Tresch	(Switzerland) Bernhard Russi	(Switzerland) Andreas Sprecher
96	SL	1970/71	17 January 1971	(United States) Tyler Palmer	(Austria) Harald Rofner	(Italy) Gustav Thöni
112	DH	1971/72	5 December 1971	(Switzerland) Bernhard Russi	(Austria) Heinrich Messner	(Switzerland) Walter Tresch
149	DH	1972/73	11 February 1973	(Austria) Werner Grissmann	(Austria) Josef Walcher	(Austria) Franz Klammer
180	DH	1974/75	15 December 1974	(Austria) Franz Klammer	(Italy) Herbert Plank	(Austria) Werner Grissmann
351	DH	1980/81	21 December 1980	(Canada) Steve Podborski	(Austria) Peter Wirnsberger	(Switzerland) Peter Müller
1105	DH	2001/02	2 February 2002	(Austria) Stephan Eberharter	(Austria) Fritz Strobl	(Austria) Michael Walchhofer
1106	GS	2001/02	3 February 2002	(Austria) Stephan Eberharter	(Switzerland) Didier Cuche	(Austria) Hans Knauß
	DH	2013/14	1 February 2014	instead of Ga-Pa, cancelled due to fog; replaced in Kvitfjell on 28 February 2014		
1546	GS	2013/14	2 February 2014	(United States) Ted Ligety	(Austria) Marcel Hirscher	(France) Alexis Pinturault
1633	DH	2015/16	16 March 2016	(Switzerland) Beat Feuz	(United States) Steven Nyman	(Canada) Erik Guay
1634	SG	2015/16	17 March 2016	(Switzerland) Beat Feuz	(Norway) Kjetil Jansrud (Norway) Aleksander Aamodt Kilde	
1635	GS	2015/16	19 March 2016	(France) Thomas Fanara	(France) Alexis Pinturault	(France) Mathieu Faivre
1636	SL	2015/16	20 March 2016	(Sweden) Andre Myhrer	(Austria) Marcel Hirscher	(Norway) Sebastian Foss-Solevåg

=== Women ===
Unclear if 1999, 2000 and 2001 events were held on Corviglia or Engiadina course?

No.	Type	Season	Date	Winner	Second	Third
110	DH	1971/72	3 December 1971	(Austria) Annemarie Pröll	(France) Françoise Macchi	(France) Jacqueline Rouvier
146	DH	1972/73	10 February 1973	(Austria) Annemarie Pröll	(Austria) Ingrid Gfölner	(Austria) Wiltrud Drexel
947	DH	1999/00	17 December 1999	(Italy) Isolde Kostner	(Germany) Regina Häusl	(Slovenia) Špela Bračun
948	DH	1999/00	18 December 1999	(Sweden) Pernilla Wiberg	(Austria) Renate Götschl	(Germany) Hilde Gerg
949	SG	1999/00	19 December 1999	(Italy) Karen Putzer	(Italy) Alessandra Merlin	(France) Régine Cavagnoud
988	DH	2000/01	16 December 2000	(Austria) Brigitte Obermoser	(Austria) Renate Götschl	(Canada) Emily Brydon
989	DH	2000/01	17 December 2000	(Austria) Renate Götschl	(Italy) Isolde Kostner	(France) Régine Cavagnoud
1020	DH	2001/02	21 December 2001	(Switzerland) Sylviane Berthod	(Italy) Isolde Kostner	(Switzerland) Corinne Rey-Bellet
1021	SG	2001/02	22 December 2001	(Italy) Karen Putzer	(Italy) Daniela Ceccarelli	(United States) Kirsten Lee Clark (Austria) Stefanie Schuster
1087	DH	2003/04	20 December 2003	(Austria) Renate Götschl	(United States) Hilde Gerg	(Germany) Maria Riesch
1164	SG	2005/06	20 January 2006	(Austria) Michaela Dorfmeister	(Slovenia) Tina Maze	(Austria) Nicole Hosp
1165	DH	2005/06	21 January 2006	(Austria) Michaela Dorfmeister	(Austria) Renate Götschl	(Croatia) Janica Kostelić
1166	SC	2005/06	22 January 2006	(Croatia) Janica Kostelić	(Sweden) Anja Pärson	(United States) Lindsey Kildow
	DH	2006/07	9 December 2006	replaced in Val d'Isère on 20 December 2006		
	SC	2006/07	10 December 2006	replaced in Reiteralm on 15 December 2006		
1225	DH	2007/08	15 December 2007	(Sweden) Anja Pärson	(United States) Lindsey Vonn	(Germany) Maria Riesch
1226	SG	2007/08	16 December 2007	(Sweden) Anja Pärson	(Canada) Emily Brydon	(Austria) Renate Götschl
1240	DH	2007/08	2 February 2008	(Slovenia) Tina Maze	(Austria) Maria Holaus	(Switzerland) Lara Gut
1241	SG	2007/08	3 February 2008	(Canada) Emily Brydon	(Austria) Elisabeth Görgl	(Austria) Renate Götschl
1260	SC	2008/09	19 December 2008	(Sweden) Anja Pärson	(Austria) Nicole Hosp	(Switzerland) Fabienne Suter
1261	SG	2008/09	20 December 2008	(Switzerland) Lara Gut	(Switzerland) Fabienne Suter	(Italy) Nadia Fanchini
	DH	2008/09	21 December 2008	high winds; replaced in Bansko on 27 February 2009		
1309	SC	2009/10	9 January 2010	(Sweden) Anja Pärson	(Austria) Michaela Kirchgasser	(United States) Lindsey Vonn
1310	DH	2009/10	10 January 2010	(Germany) Maria Riesch	(France) Ingrid Jacquemod	(Switzerland) Fabienne Suter
1311	SG	2009/10	11 January 2010	(United States) Lindsey Vonn	(Austria) Andrea Fischbacher (France) Marie Marchand-Arvier	
	SG	2010/11	11 December 2010	cancelled during 1st run, strong winds; replaced in Val-d'Isère on 17 December 2010		
1325	GS	2010/11	12 December 2010	(France) Tessa Worley	(Finland) Tanja Poutiainen	(Slovenia) Tina Maze
1369	SC	2011/12	27 January 2012	(United States) Lindsey Vonn	(Slovenia) Tina Maze	(Austria) Nicole Hosp
1371	SC	2011/12	29 January 2012	(Germany) Maria Höfl-Riesch	(United States) Lindsey Vonn	(Austria) Nicole Hosp
1397	GS	2012/13	9 December 2012	(Slovenia) Tina Maze	(Germany) Viktoria Rebensburg	(France) Tessa Worley
1432	GS	2013/14	15 December 2013	(France) Tessa Worley	(Sweden) Jessica Lindell-Vikarby	(Slovenia) Tina Maze
1524	SG	2015/16	17 March 2016	(Liechtenstein) Tina Weirather	(Switzerland) Lara Gut	(Austria) Cornelia Hütter
1525	SL	2015/16	19 March 2016	(United States) Mikaela Shiffrin	(Slovakia) Veronika Velez-Zuzulová	(Sweden) Frida Hansdotter
1526	GS	2015/16	20 March 2016	(Germany) Viktoria Rebensburg	(France) Taina Barioz	(Switzerland) Lara Gut
1706	SG	2021/22	11 December 2021	(Switzerland) Lara Gut-Behrami	(Italy) Sofia Goggia	(United States) Mikaela Shiffrin
1707	SG	2021/22	12 December 2021	(Italy) Federica Brignone	(Italy) Elena Curtoni	(United States) Mikaela Shiffrin
1744	DH	2022/23	16 December 2022	(Italy) Elena Curtoni	(Italy) Sofia Goggia	(Switzerland) Corinne Suter
1745	DH	2022/23	17 December 2022	(Italy) Sofia Goggia	(Slovenia) Ilka Štuhec	(Germany) Kira Weidle
1746	DH	2022/23	18 December 2022	(United States) Mikaela Shiffrin	(Italy) Elena Curtoni	(France) Romane Miradoli
1780	SG	2023/24	8 December 2023	(Italy) Sofia Goggia	(Austria) Cornelia Hütter	(Switzerland) Lara Gut-Behrami
1781	DH	2023/24	9 December 2023	(United States) Mikaela Shiffrin	(Italy) Sofia Goggia	(Italy) Federica Brignone
	SG	2023/24	10 December 2023	heavy snowfall and wet snow; moved to Altenmarkt-Zauchensee on 12 January 2024		
1819	SG	2024/25	21 December 2024	(Austria) Cornelia Hütter	(Switzerland) Lara Gut-Behrami	(Italy) Sofia Goggia
	SG	2024/25	22 December 2024	cancelled due to strong wind and poor visibility		
1853	DH	2025/26	12 December 2025	(United States) Lindsey Vonn	(Austria) Magdalena Egger	(Austria) Mirjam Puchner
1854	DH	2025/26	13 December 2025	(Germany) Emma Aicher	(United States) Lindsey Vonn	(Italy) Sofia Goggia
1855	SG	2025/26	14 December 2025	(New Zealand) Alice Robinson	(France) Romane Miradoli	(Italy) Sofia Goggia

Super-G (speed event of super combined) was held on Engiadina course.
Not in original World Cup calendar. It replaced Laax (2003) and Val-d'Isère (2007, 2012).

== Full course sections ==
- Frei Fall
- Super-G start
- Martin Berthod Kante (former Suvretta Kante)
- Lanigiro
- Mauritius
- Mauer
- Weißes Band
- Alp Giop
- Romingersprung
- Lärchensprung
- Salastrains (finish area)
