= Engiadina =

Ski course in St. Moritz, Switzerland

- Interactive map of Engiadina
- Location within Switzerland
- 46°30′14″N 9°48′04″E
- Location: St. Moritz, Switzerland
- Mountain: Piz Nair, Albula Alps
- Level: expert

Downhill
- Start: 2,745 m (9,006 ft) (AA)
- Finish: 2,040 m (6,693 ft)
- Vertical drop: 705 m (2,313 ft)
- Length: 2,633 m (1.64 mi)

Super-G
- Start: 2,590 m (8,497 ft) (AA)
- Finish: 2,040 m (6,693 ft)
- Vertical drop: 550 m (1,804 ft)
- Length: 1,950 m (1.21 mi)

Engiadiana is a World Cup ski course in Switzerland at St. Moritz, Grisons, located in the Engadin valley on Piz Nair mountain in the Albula Alps.

It is adjacent to the older and more famous men's "Corviglia" speed events course, which hosted the Winter Olympics in 1948 and several World Championships.

== World Championships ==
=== Men's events ===
Event	Type	Date	Gold	Silver	Bronze
2003	SG	6 February 2003	(United States) Bode Miller	(Norway) Lasse Kjus	(Norway) Kjetil André Aamodt
2003	DH	12 February 2003	(United States) Bode Miller	(Austria) Hans Knauß	(United States) Erik Schlopy

=== Women's events ===
Event	Type	Date	Gold	Silver	Bronze
2003	SG	3 February 2003	(Austria) Michaela Dorfmeister	(United States) Kirsten Lee Clark	(United States) Jonna Mendes
2003	DH	9 February 2003	(Canada) Mélanie Turgeon	(Switzerland) Corinne Rey-Bellet	(Austria) Alexandra Meissnitzer
2003	KB	10 February 2003	(Croatia) Janica Kostelić	(Austria) Nicole Hosp	(Switzerland) Marlies Oester
2003	GS	13 February 2003	(Sweden) Anja Pärson	(Italy) Denise Karbon	(Canada) Allison Forsyth
2003	SL	15 February 2003	(Croatia) Janica Kostelić	(Austria) Marlies Schild	(Austria) Nicole Hosp
2017	SG	7 February 2017	(Austria) Nicole Schmidhofer	(Liechtenstein) Tina Weirather	(Switzerland) Lara Gut
2017	AC	10 February 2017	(Switzerland) Wendy Holdener	(United States) Michelle Gisin	(Austria) Michaela Kirchgasser
2017	DH	12 February 2017	(Slovenia) Ilka Štuhec	(Austria) Stephanie Venier	(United States) Lindsey Vonn

== World Cup ==
=== Women ===
Unclear if 1999, 2000 and 2001 events were held on Corviglia or Engiadina course?

No.	Type	Season	Date	Winner	Second	Third
947	DH	1999/00	17 December 1999	(Italy) Isolde Kostner	(Germany) Regina Häusl	(Slovenia) Špela Bračun
948	DH	1999/00	18 December 1999	(Sweden) Pernilla Wiberg	(Austria) Renate Götschl	(Germany) Hilde Gerg
949	SG	1999/00	19 December 1999	(Italy) Karen Putzer	(Italy) Alessandra Merlin	(France) Régine Cavagnoud
988	DH	2000/01	16 December 2000	(Austria) Brigitte Obermoser	(Austria) Renate Götschl	(Canada) Emily Brydon
989	DH	2000/01	17 December 2000	(Austria) Renate Götschl	(Italy) Isolde Kostner	(France) Régine Cavagnoud
1020	DH	2001/02	21 December 2001	(Switzerland) Sylviane Berthod	(Italy) Isolde Kostner	(Switzerland) Corinne Rey-Bellet
1021	SG	2001/02	22 December 2001	(Italy) Karen Putzer	(Italy) Daniela Ceccarelli	(United States) Kirsten Lee Clark (Austria) Stefanie Schuster
1122	SG	2004/05	21 December 2004	(Germany) Hilde Gerg	(United States) Lindsey Kildow	(Germany) Maria Riesch
1123	GS	2004/05	22 December 2004	(Slovenia) Tina Maze	(Sweden) Anja Pärson	(Spain) María José Rienda Contreras
1369	SC	2011/12	27 January 2012	(United States) Lindsey Vonn	(Slovenia) Tina Maze	(Austria) Nicole Hosp
1370	DH	2011/12	28 January 2012	(United States) Lindsey Vonn	(Germany) Maria Höfl-Riesch	(Liechtenstein) Tina Weirather
1371	SC	2011/12	29 January 2012	(Germany) Maria Höfl-Riesch	(United States) Lindsey Vonn	(Austria) Nicole Hosp
1395	SC	2012/13	7 December 2012	(Slovenia) Tina Maze	(Austria) Nicole Hosp	(Austria) Kathrin Zettel
1396	SG	2012/13	8 December 2012	(United States) Lindsey Vonn	(Slovenia) Tina Maze	(United States) Julia Mancuso
1431	SG	2013/14	14 December 2013	(Liechtenstein) Tina Weirather	(Sweden) Kajsa Kling	(Austria) Anna Fenninger
1473	DH	2014/15	24 January 2015	(Switzerland) Lara Gut	(Austria) Anna Fenninger	(Hungary) Edit Miklós
1474	SG	2014/15	25 January 2015	(United States) Lindsey Vonn	(Austria) Anna Fenninger	(Austria) Nicole Hosp
1523	DH	2015/16	16 March 2016	(Austria) Mirjam Puchner	(Switzerland) Fabienne Suter	(Italy) Elena Curtoni
	AC	2017/18	8 December 2017	heavy fog; replaced with Super-G in St. Moritz on 10 December 2017		
1571	SG	2017/18	9 December 2017	(Switzerland) Jasmine Flury	(Switzerland) Michelle Gisin	(Liechtenstein) Tina Weirather
	SG	2017/18	10 December 2017	poor visibility; replaced in Val d'Isère on 16 December 2017		
	AC	2017/18	10 December 2017	poor visibility; finally replaced in Lenzerheide on 26 January 2018		
1609	SG	2018/19	8 December 2018	(United States) Mikaela Shiffrin	(Switzerland) Lara Gut-Behrami	(Liechtenstein) Tina Weirather
1644	SG	2019/20	14 December 2019	(Italy) Sofia Goggia	(Italy) Federica Brignone	(United States) Mikaela Shiffrin
	SG	2020/21	5 December 2020	heavy snow and wind; replaced in Crans-Montana on 24 January 2021		
	SG	2020/21	6 December 2020	heavy snow and wind; rescheduled for Val di Fassa on 26 February 2021		

Not in original World Cup calendar. It replaced Val-d'Isère (2012).

== Full course sections ==
- Britain station start (at "Free Fall" bottom), Fashion Alpina, Super-G start, Foppa, Gianda, Großes Loch, Weißes Band, Reinaltersprung, Engnis, Lärchenweg, Salastrains (finish area).
