= Hauser Kaibling =

Mountain in the Austrian Alps

Coordinates: 47°22′25″N 13°46′43″E

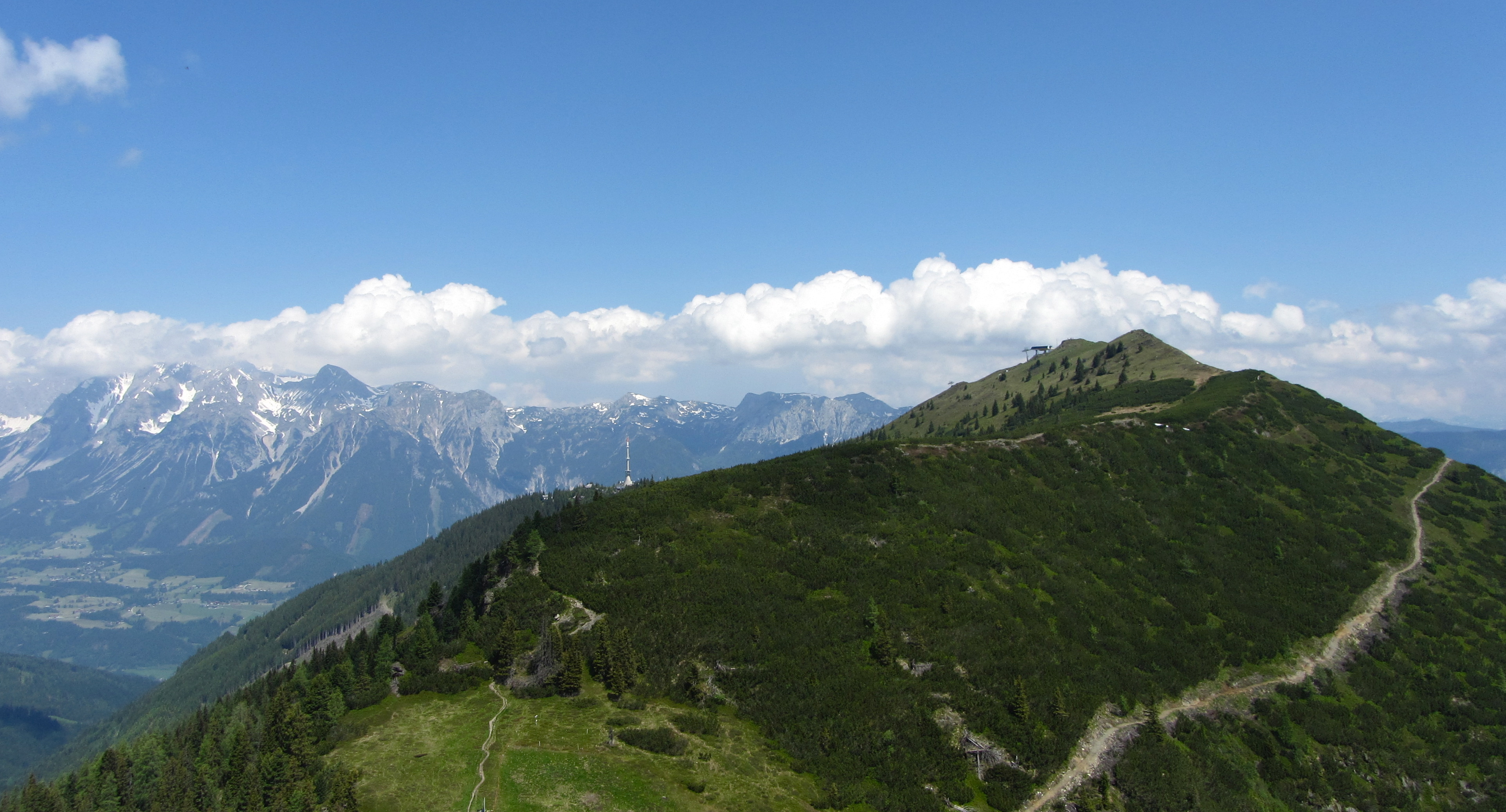
- Interactive map of Hauser Kaibling
- Location: Austria
- Top elevation: 2,015 meters (6,611 ft)
- Base elevation: 752 meters (2,467 ft)
- Skiable area: 167 Piste Kilometers
- Longest run: 7 km (4.3 mi)
- Lift system: 10 total (2 Cable Car, 2 four-Seat and 4 four-seat chairlift, 2 Tow Lifts)
- Website: https://www.hauser-kaibling.at/

Hauser Kaibling is a ski area located within the Schladming-Dachstein ski area in the Ennstal Alps. Hauser Kaibling is part of the Schladminger 4-Berge-Schaukel, four connected mountains. The other three are Planai, Hochwurzen and Reiteralm (Styria), and they form the four highest mountains in Styria.

The village of Haus im Ennstal is at the foot of Hauser Kaibling.

In 1908 the Krummholzhütte was built.
