= 2001–02 FIS Alpine Ski World Cup =

International sports competition

FIS Alpine Ski World Cup 2001/02
Discipline	Men	Women
Overall	(Austria) Stephan Eberharter	(Austria) Michaela Dorfmeister
Downhill	(Austria) Stephan Eberharter	(Italy) Isolde Kostner
Super-G	(Austria) Stephan Eberharter	(Germany) Hilde Gerg
Giant slalom	(France) Frédéric Covili	(Switzerland) Sonja Nef
Slalom	(Croatia) Ivica Kostelić	(France) Laure Pequegnot
Combined	(Norway) Kjetil André Aamodt	(Austria) Renate Götschl
- Nations Cup: Austria

Competition
Locations	16	14
Individual	35	34
Cancelled	—	—
Rescheduled	6	4

The 36th World Cup began in October 2001 and ended in March 2002 at the World Cup finals held in Altenmarkt, Austria. The overall winners were Stephan Eberharter and Michaela Dorfmeister, both from Austria.

The schedule for the 36th World Cup season included a nearly four-week-long break in February for the Winter Olympics in the United States at Salt Lake City, Utah.

This was the first season that colored dye was used on the snow to mark the courses.

== Calendar ==
=== Men ===
Event key: DH – Downhill, SL – Slalom, GS – Giant slalom, SG – Super giant slalom, KB – Combined
Race	Season	Date	Place	Type	Winner	Second	Third
1078	1	28 October 2001	(Austria) Sölden	GS _{273}	(France) Frédéric Covili	(Austria) Stephan Eberharter	(Switzerland) Michael von Grünigen (Sweden) Fredrik Nyberg
		16 November 2001	(United States) Park City	GS _{cnx}	replaced in Kranjska Gora on 20 December 2001		
		18 November 2001	(United States) Park City	SL _{cnx}	replaced in Aspen on 26 November 2001		
		22 November 2001	(Canada) Lake Louise	DH _{cnx}	replaced in Val Gardena on 14 December 2001		
		23 November 2001	(Canada) Lake Louise	SG _{cnx}	replaced in Garmisch-Partenkirchen on 26 January 2002		
1079	2	25 November 2001	(United States) Aspen	SL _{313}	(Croatia) Ivica Kostelić	(Italy) Giorgio Rocca	(Austria) Mario Matt
1080	3	(Note: Slalom from Park City was rescheduled to Aspen on 26 November 2001)26 November 2001	(United States) Aspen	SL _{314}	(Austria) Mario Matt	(United States) Bode Miller	(France) Jean-Pierre Vidal
		1 December 2001	(United States) Beaver Creek	DH _{cnx}	replaced in Bormio on 28 December 2001		
		2 December 2001	(United States) Beaver Creek	SG _{cnx}	replaced in Val d'Isère on 7 December 2001		
1081	4	(Note: Super G from Beaver Creek was rescheduled to Val d'Isère on 7 December 2001.)7 December 2001	(France) Val d'Isère	SG _{098}	(Austria) Stephan Eberharter	(Switzerland) Didier Cuche	(Switzerland) Silvano Beltrametti
1082	5	8 December 2001	(France) Val d'Isère	DH _{315}	(Austria) Stephan Eberharter	(Italy) Kurt Sulzenbacher	(Austria) Michael Walchhofer
1083	6	9 December 2001	(France) Val d'Isère	GS _{274}	(United States) Bode Miller	(France) Frédéric Covili	(Austria) Stephan Eberharter
1084	7	10 December 2001	(Italy) Madonna di Campiglio	SL _{315}	(United States) Bode Miller	(Italy) Giorgio Rocca	(Norway) Tom Stiansen
1085	8	(Note: Downhill from Lake Louise was rescheduled to Val Gardena on 14 December 2001.)14 December 2001	(Italy) Val Gardena	DH _{316}	(Italy) Kristian Ghedina	(Norway) Lasse Kjus	(Italy) Kurt Sulzenbacher
1086	9	15 December 2001	(Italy) Val Gardena	DH _{317}	(Austria) Stephan Eberharter	(Austria) Michael Walchhofer	(Norway) Kjetil André Aamodt
1087	10	16 December 2001	(Italy) Alta Badia	GS _{275}	(France) Frédéric Covili	(Switzerland) Michael von Grünigen	(Finland) Sami Uotila
1088	11	(Note: Giant slalom from Aspen was rescheduled to Kranjska Gora on 20 December 2001.)20 December 2001	(Slovenia) Kranjska Gora	GS _{276}	(Sweden) Fredrik Nyberg	(Austria) Benjamin Raich	(Slovenia) Uroš Pavlovčič
1089	12	21 December 2001	(Slovenia) Kranjska Gora	GS _{277}	(Austria) Benjamin Raich	(United States) Bode Miller	(Switzerland) Didier Cuche
1090	13	22 December 2001	(Slovenia) Kranjska Gora	SL _{316}	(France) Jean-Pierre Vidal	(Austria) Mario Matt	(Croatia) Ivica Kostelić
1091	14	(Note: Super G from Beaver Creek was rescheduled to Bormio on 28 December 2001.)28 December 2001	(Italy) Bormio	DH _{318}	(Austria) Christian Greber	(Austria) Fritz Strobl	(Austria) Stephan Eberharter
1092	15	29 December 2001	(Italy) Bormio	DH _{319}	(Austria) Fritz Strobl	(Austria) Josef Strobl	(Austria) Stephan Eberharter
1093	16	5 January 2002	(Switzerland) Adelboden	GS _{278}	(Switzerland) Didier Cuche	(France) Frédéric Covili	(Sweden) Fredrik Nyberg
1094	17	6 January 2002	(Switzerland) Adelboden	SL _{317}	(United States) Bode Miller	(Croatia) Ivica Kostelić	(Slovenia) Mitja Kunc
1095	18	12 January 2002	(Switzerland) Wengen	DH _{320}	(Austria) Stephan Eberharter	(Austria) Hannes Trinkl	(Austria) Josef Strobl
1096	19	13 January 2002	(Switzerland) Wengen	SL _{318}	(Croatia) Ivica Kostelić	(Slovenia) Mitja Kunc	(Italy) Edoardo Zardini
1097	20	13 January 2002	(Switzerland) Wengen	KB _{081}	(Norway) Kjetil André Aamodt	(United States) Bode Miller	(Norway) Lasse Kjus
1098	21	18 January 2002	(Austria) Kitzbühel	SG _{099}	(Austria) Stephan Eberharter	(Italy) Alessandro Fattori	(Switzerland) Didier Cuche
1099	22	19 January 2002	(Austria) Kitzbühel	DH _{321}	(Austria) Stephan Eberharter	(Norway) Kjetil André Aamodt	(Austria) Hannes Trinkl
1100	23	20 January 2002	(Austria) Kitzbühel	SL _{319}	(Austria) Rainer Schönfelder	(Austria) Kilian Albrecht	(United States) Bode Miller
1101	24	20 January 2002	(Austria) Kitzbühel	KB _{082}	(Norway) Kjetil André Aamodt	(Norway) Lasse Kjus	(Austria) Michael Walchhofer
1102	25	22 January 2002	(Austria) Schladming	SL _{320}	(United States) Bode Miller	(France) Jean-Pierre Vidal	(Croatia) Ivica Kostelić
1103	26	(Note: Super G from Lake Louise was rescheduled to Garmisch-Partenkirchen on 26 January 2002.)26 January 2002	(Germany) Garmisch-Partenkirchen	SG _{100}	(Austria) Fritz Strobl	(Switzerland) Didier Cuche	(Austria) Stephan Eberharter
1104	27	27 January 2002	(Germany) Garmisch-Partenkirchen	SG _{101}	(Austria) Stephan Eberharter	(Switzerland) Didier Cuche	(Austria) Andreas Schifferer
1105	28	2 February 2002	(Switzerland) St. Moritz	DH _{322}	(Austria) Stephan Eberharter	(Austria) Fritz Strobl	(Austria) Michael Walchhofer
1106	29	3 February 2002	(Switzerland) St. Moritz	GS _{279}	(Austria) Stephan Eberharter	(Switzerland) Didier Cuche	(Austria) Hans Knauß
2002 Winter Olympics (10–23 February)
1107	30	2 March 2002	(Norway) Kvitfjell	DH _{323}	(Austria) Hannes Trinkl	(France) Claude Crétier	(Switzerland) Franco Cavegn (Italy) Kristian Ghedina
1108	31	3 March 2002	(Norway) Kvitfjell	SG _{102}	(Italy) Alessandro Fattori	(Switzerland) Didier Défago	(Austria) Stephan Eberharter
1109	32	6 March 2002	(Austria) Altenmarkt im Pongau	DH _{324}	(Austria) Stephan Eberharter	(Switzerland) Ambrosi Hoffmann	(Austria) Hannes Trinkl
1110	33	7 March 2002	(Austria) Altenmarkt im Pongau	SG _{103}	(Switzerland) Didier Cuche	(Austria) Fritz Strobl	(Italy) Alessandro Fattori
1111	34	9 March 2002	(Austria) Altenmarkt im Pongau	SL _{321}	(Croatia) Ivica Kostelić	(United States) Bode Miller	(France) Jean-Pierre Vidal
1112	35	10 March 2002	(Austria) Altenmarkt im Pongau	GS _{280}	(Switzerland) Michael von Grünigen	(Austria) Benjamin Raich	(Austria) Stephan Eberharter

=== Ladies ===
Event key: DH – Downhill, SL – Slalom, GS – Giant slalom, SG – Super giant slalom, KB – Combined
Race	Season	Date	Place	Type	Winner	Second	Third
1011	1	27 October 2001	(Austria) Sölden	GS _{268}	(Austria) Michaela Dorfmeister	(Switzerland) Sonja Nef	(France) Régine Cavagnoud
		21 November 2001	(United States) Aspen	GS _{cnx}	replaced in Copper Mountain on 21 November 2001		
		22 November 2001	(United States) Aspen	SL _{cnx}	replaced in Copper Mountain on 22 November 2001		
1012	2	(Note: Giant slalom from Aspen was rescheduled to Copper Mountain on 21 November 2001)21 November 2001	(United States) Copper Mountain	GS _{269}	(Norway) Andrine Flemmen	(Canada) Allison Forsyth	(Switzerland) Sonja Nef
1013	3	(Note: Slalom from Aspen was rescheduled to Copper Mountain on 22 November 2001)22 November 2001	(United States) Copper Mountain	SL _{303}	(France) Laure Pequegnot	(Austria) Christine Sponring	(Austria) Carina Raich
1014	4	29 November 2001	(Canada) Lake Louise	DH _{264}	(Italy) Isolde Kostner	(Austria) Michaela Dorfmeister	(Switzerland) Corinne Rey-Bellet
1015	5	30 November 2001	(Canada) Lake Louise	DH _{265}	(Italy) Isolde Kostner	(Switzerland) Sylviane Berthod	(Austria) Michaela Dorfmeister
1016	6	1 December 2001	(Canada) Lake Louise	SG _{107}	(Germany) Petra Haltmayr	(France) Carole Montillet	(United States) Caroline Lalive
1017	7	9 December 2001	(Italy) Sestriere	SL _{304}	(Sweden) Anja Pärson	(Finland) Tanja Poutiainen	(Switzerland) Sonja Nef
		15 December 2001	(France) Megève	SG _{cnx}	replaced in Val d'Isère on 15 December 2001		
		16 December 2001	(France) Megève	GS _{cnx}	replaced in Val d'Isère on 16 December 2001		
1018	8	(Note: Super giant slalom from Megève was rescheduled to Val d'Isère on 15 December 2001)15 December 2001	(France) Val d'Isère	SG _{108}	(Germany) Hilde Gerg	(Austria) Renate Götschl	(Austria) Tanja Schneider
1019	9	(Note: Giant slalom from Megève was rescheduled to Val d'Isère on 16 December 2001)16 December 2001	(France) Val d'Isère	GS _{270}	(Switzerland) Sonja Nef	(Sweden) Anja Pärson	(Austria) Michaela Dorfmeister
1020	10	21 December 2001	(Switzerland) St. Moritz	DH _{266}	(Switzerland) Sylviane Berthod	(Italy) Isolde Kostner	(Switzerland) Corinne Rey-Bellet
1021	11	22 December 2001	(Switzerland) St. Moritz	SG _{109}	(Italy) Karen Putzer	(Italy) Daniela Ceccarelli	(United States) Kirsten Lee Clark (Austria) Stefanie Schuster
1022	12	28 December 2001	(Austria) Lienz	GS _{271}	(Switzerland) Lilian Kummer	(Italy) Karen Putzer	(Sweden) Ylva Nowén (Sweden) Anja Pärson
1023	13	29 December 2001	(Austria) Lienz	SL _{305}	(Sweden) Anja Pärson	(Germany) Monika Bergmann (United States) Kristina Koznick	
1024	14	4 January 2002	(Slovenia) Maribor	GS _{272}	(Switzerland) Sonja Nef	(Slovenia) Tina Maze	(Norway) Stina Hofgård Nilsen
1025	15	5 January 2002	(Slovenia) Maribor	SL _{306}	(Sweden) Anja Pärson	(United States) Kristina Koznick	(France) Laure Pequegnot
1026	16	6 January 2002	(Slovenia) Maribor	SL _{307}	(Sweden) Anja Pärson	(France) Laure Pequegnot	(Switzerland) Sonja Nef
1027	17	11 January 2002	(Austria) Saalbach	DH _{267}	(Germany) Hilde Gerg	(Sweden) Pernilla Wiberg	(Italy) Isolde Kostner
1028	18	12 January 2002	(Austria) Saalbach	DH _{268}	(Germany) Hilde Gerg	(Austria) Renate Götschl	(Austria) Michaela Dorfmeister
1029	19	13 January 2002	(Austria) Saalbach	SL _{308}	(France) Laure Pequegnot	(Switzerland) Sonja Nef	(Sweden) Ylva Nowén
1030	20	13 January 2002	(Austria) Saalbach	KB _{070}	(Austria) Renate Götschl	(Croatia) Janica Kostelić	(Austria) Michaela Dorfmeister
1031	21	19 January 2002	(Germany) Berchtesgaden	GS _{273}	(Austria) Michaela Dorfmeister	(Norway) Stina Hofgård Nilsen	(Canada) Geneviève Simard
1032	22	20 January 2002	(Germany) Berchtesgaden	SL _{309}	(United States) Kristina Koznick (Switzerland) Marlies Oester		(Croatia) Janica Kostelić
1033	23	25 January 2002	(Italy) Cortina d'Ampezzo	SG _{110}	(Germany) Hilde Gerg	(Austria) Renate Götschl	(Austria) Alexandra Meissnitzer
1034	24	26 January 2002	(Italy) Cortina d'Ampezzo	DH _{269}	(Austria) Renate Götschl	(Italy) Isolde Kostner	(Italy) Daniela Ceccarelli
1035	25	27 January 2002	(Italy) Cortina d'Ampezzo	GS _{274}	(Norway) Stina Hofgård Nilsen	(Norway) Andrine Flemmen	(Italy) Karen Putzer
1036	26	31 January 2002	(Sweden) Åre	GS _{275}	(Austria) Michaela Dorfmeister	(Sweden) Anja Pärson	(Switzerland) Sonja Nef
1037	27	2 February 2002	(Sweden) Åre	DH _{270}	(Austria) Renate Götschl	(Austria) Selina Heregger	(Italy) Isolde Kostner
1038	28	3 February 2002	(Sweden) Åre	SL _{310}	(France) Laure Pequegnot	(United States) Kristina Koznick	(Sweden) Ylva Nowén
1039	29	3 February 2002	(Sweden) Åre	KB _{071}	(Austria) Renate Götschl	(Sweden) Janette Hargin	(Austria) Selina Heregger
2002 Winter Olympics (10–23 February)
1040	30	2 March 2002	(Switzerland) Lenzerheide	DH _{271}	(Switzerland) Corinne Rey-Bellet	(France) Mélanie Suchet	(Germany) Hilde Gerg
1041	31	6 March 2002	(Austria) Altenmarkt	DH _{272}	(Austria) Michaela Dorfmeister	(United States) Caroline Lalive	(France) Mélanie Suchet
1042	32	7 March 2002	(Austria) Altenmarkt	SG _{111}	(Austria) Michaela Dorfmeister	(Austria) Alexandra Meissnitzer	(Germany) Hilde Gerg
1043	33	9 March 2002	(Austria) Altenmarkt	GS _{276}	(Switzerland) Sonja Nef	(Sweden) Anna Ottosson	(Finland) Tanja Poutiainen
1044	34	10 March 2002	(Austria) Altenmarkt	SL _{311}	(Croatia) Janica Kostelić	(Sweden) Anja Pärson	(Sweden) Ylva Nowén

== Men ==
=== Overall ===
Place	Name	Country	Total
1	Stephan Eberharter	Austria	1702
2	Kjetil André Aamodt	Norway	936
3	Bode Miller	United States	820
4	Didier Cuche	Switzerland	766
5	Fritz Strobl	Austria	562
6	Lasse Kjus	Norway	549
7	Ivica Kostelić	Croatia	548
8	Fredrik Nyberg	Sweden	495
9	Frederic Covili	France	413
10	Jean-Pierre Vidal	France	402

=== Downhill ===
Place	Name	Country	Total
1	Stephan Eberharter	Austria	810
2	Fritz Strobl	Austria	520
3	Kristian Ghedina	Italy	381
4	Franco Cavegn	Switzerland	366
5	Hannes Trinkl	Austria	350

=== Super G ===
Place	Name	Country	Total
1	Stephan Eberharter	Austria	470
2	Didier Cuche	Switzerland	426
3	Fritz Strobl	Austria	326
4	Alessandro Fattori	Italy	294
5	Andreas Schifferer	Austria	214

=== Giant slalom ===
Place	Name	Country	Total
1	Frédéric Covili	France	471
2	Benjamin Raich	Austria	429
3	Stephan Eberharter	Austria	422
4	Didier Cuche	Switzerland	420
5	Fredrik Nyberg	Sweden	405

=== Slalom ===
Place	Name	Country	Total
1	Ivica Kostelić	Croatia	611
2	Bode Miller	United States	560
3	Jean-Pierre Vidal	France	456
4	Mitja Kunc	Slovenia	322
5	Rainer Schönfelder	Austria	318

=== Combined ===
Place	Name	Country	Total
1	Kjetil André Aamodt	Norway	200
2	Lasse Kjus	Norway	140
3	Andrej Jerman	Slovenia	82
4	Bode Miller	United States	80
5	Michael Walchhofer	Austria	60

== Ladies ==
=== Overall ===
Place	Name	Country	Total
1	Michaela Dorfmeister	Austria	1271
2	Renate Götschl	Austria	931
3	Sonja Nef	Switzerland	904
4	Hilde Gerg	Germany	847
5	Anja Pärson	Sweden	840
6	Isolde Kostner	Italy	641
7	Corinne Rey-Bellet	Switzerland	618
8	Kristina Koznick	United States	612
9	Laure Pequegnot	France	597
10	Ylva Nowén	Sweden	551

=== Downhill ===
Place	Name	Country	Total
1	Isolde Kostner	Italy	568
2	Michaela Dorfmeister	Austria	469
3	Corinne Rey-Bellet	Switzerland	414
4	Hilde Gerg	Germany	412
5	Renate Götschl	Austria	408

=== Super G ===
Place	Name	Country	Total
1	Hilde Gerg	Germany	355
2	Alexandra Meissnitzer	Austria	248
3	Michaela Dorfmeister	Austria	212
4	Renate Götschl	Austria	210
5	Karen Putzer	Italy	192

=== Giant slalom ===
Place	Name	Country	Total
1	Sonja Nef	Switzerland	574
2	Michaela Dorfmeister	Austria	494
3	Anja Pärson	Sweden	360
4	Andrine Flemmen	Norway	335
5	Stina Hofgård Nilsen	Norway	330

=== Slalom ===
Place	Name	Country	Total
1	Laure Pequegnot	France	597
2	Kristina Koznick	United States	518
3	Anja Pärson	Sweden	480
4	Sonja Nef	Switzerland	330
5	Ylva Nowén	Sweden	328

=== Combined ===
Place	Name	Country	Total
1	Renate Götschl	Austria	200
2	Michaela Dorfmeister	Austria	95
3	Brigitte Obermoser	Austria	82
4	Janette Hargin	Sweden	80
5	Janica Kostelić	Croatia	80
