= Planai =

Mountain in Styria, Austria

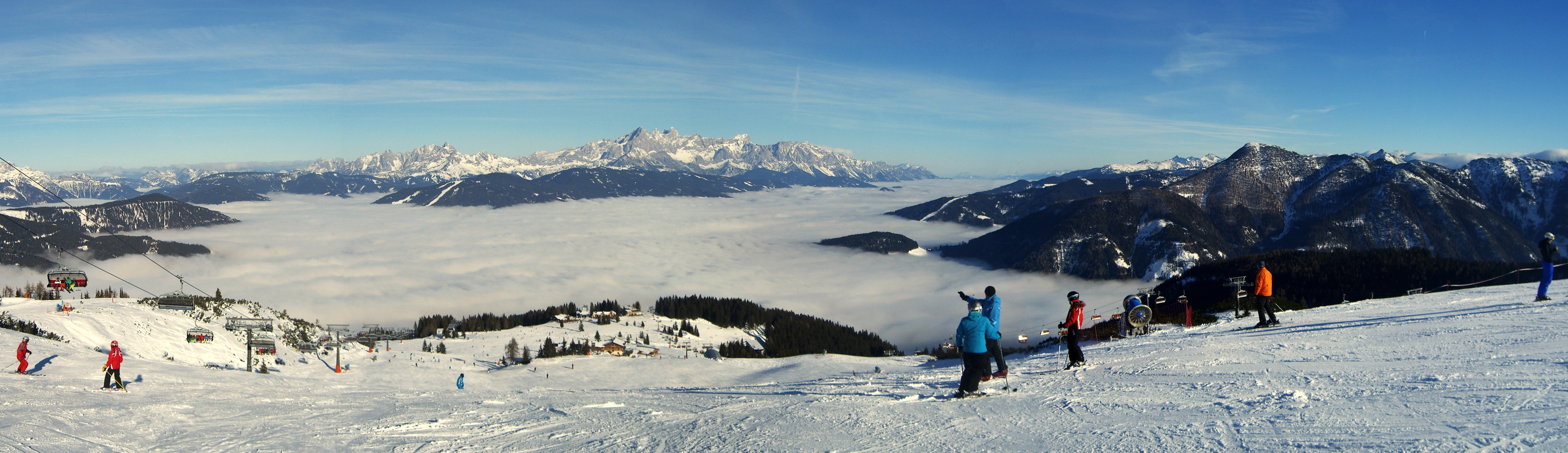

- Location in Austria
- Location: Schladming, Styria; Austria
- Coordinates: 47.392°N 13.694°E
- Vertical: 1,144 m (3,753 ft)
- Top elevation: 1,894 m (6,214 ft)
- Base elevation: 750 m (2,461 ft)
- Skiable area: piste: 167 km (104 mi)
- Terrain parks: 1 - Superpark Planai
- Website: planai.at

Planai is a ski area in central Austria, the main mountain in the Schladming area in Styria.

It is one of four adjoining mountains, which includes Hauser Kaibling, Hochwurzen and Reiteralm, connected under the name Schladminger 4-Berge-Schaukel. It is not regarded as a single mountain and all text from the official website cites the total amount of pistes.

Planai was the host venue of the FIS Alpine World Ski Championships in 2013, held in early February. Schladming previously hosted alpine skiing's major biennial event in 1982, with the men's events at Planai and the women's at Haus im Ennstal.

In preparation for the World Championships in 2013, Planai hosted the World Cup finals in March 2012. It is a regular stop on the World Cup circuit, usually with a men's night slalom in January prior to the Hahnenkamm races at Kitzbühel.
