= Schladminger 4-Berge-Schaukel =

Four interconnected ski mountains in Austria

- Location: Schladming, Haus im Ennstal, Rohrmoos-Untertal, Pichl-Preunegg, Austria
- Top elevation: 2,015 meters (6,611 ft)
- Base elevation: 750 meters (2,460 ft)
- Skiable area: 123 Piste Kilometers Total
- Longest run: 7.7 km (4.8 mi)
- Lift system: 81 total (0 Cable Car, 0 Double Seat chairlift, 0 Tow Lifts)
- Terrain parks: Several
- Website: http://www.planai.at/winter/index.php

The Schladminger 4-Berge-Schaukel is the name of four interconnected ski mountains in Austria.

The mountains haves a total of 167 kilometres of pistes and 81 lift facilities between the four mountains: Hauser Kaibling, Planai, Hochwurzen, and Reiteralm, and is part of the Ski Amadé resorts.
