= Croatia national alpine ski team =

Croatia
- National federation: Croatian Ski Federation

Olympic Games
- Appearances: 9
- Medals: 10

World Championships
- Appearances: 16
- Medals: 10

The Croatian national alpine ski team represents Croatia in international alpine skiing competitions such as Winter Olympic Games, FIS Alpine Ski World Cup and FIS Alpine World Ski Championships.

== World Cup ==
Croatian alpine skiers have won 4 overall FIS Alpine Ski World Cup titles, 1 with men and 3 with women

=== Titles ===
men women
Skier	Overall	Downhill	Super G	Giant slalom	Slalom	Combined	Total
Janica Kostelić	3				3	4	10
Ivica Kostelić	1				2	3	6
Zrinka Ljutić					1		1

=== Overview by season ===
Year	Athletes	Achievements
1999	Janica Kostelić	2nd in Combined
2001	Janica Kostelić	Overall, Slalom, and Combined champion
2003	Janica Kostelić Ivica Kostelić	Overall, Slalom, and Combined champion, 3rd in Giant Slalom 2nd in Slalom
2004	Ivica Kostelić	Slalom champion
2005	Janica Kostelić	2nd in Overall, 2nd in Slalom, and Combined champion
2006	Janica Kostelić	Overall, Slalom, and Combined champion, 3rd in Giant Slalom
2007	Ivica Kostelić	3rd in Combined
2008	Ivica Kostelić	2nd in Combined
2009	Ivica Kostelić	2nd in Slalom
2010	Ivica Kostelić	3rd in Combined
2011	Ivica Kostelić	Overall, Slalom, and Combined champion, 3rd in Super-G
2012	Ivica Kostelić	Combined champion, 2nd in Slalom
2013	Ivica Kostelić	Combined champion, 3rd in Slalom
2020	Filip Zubčić	3rd in Giant Slalom
2021	Filip Zubčić	3rd in Giant Slalom
2024	Filip Zubčić	3rd in Giant Slalom
2025	Zrinka Ljutić	Slalom champion

=== Podiums and wins ===
#	Skier	Wins	DH	SG	GS	SL	KB	PR	Podiums
1	Janica Kostelić	30	1	1	2	20	6		55
2	Ivica Kostelić	26		1		15	9	1	60
3	Filip Zubčić	3			3				12
4	Zrinka Ljutić	3				3			9
5	Natko Zrnčić-Dim	0							5
6	Ana Jelušić Black	0							2
7	Leona Popović	0							2
8	Samuel Kolega	0							1

== World Championship ==
Medals	Disciplines						Combined
Medals	DH	SG	GS	SL	KB	PR	Combined
Gold	1			3	2		6
Silver					1	1	2
Bronze		1			1		2

== Olympic games ==
Medal	Name	Games	Sport	Event	Date
Gold	Janica Kostelić	(United States) 2002 Salt Lake City	Alpine skiing	Women's combined	14 February 2002
Gold	Janica Kostelić	(United States) 2002 Salt Lake City	Alpine skiing	Women's slalom	20 February 2002
Gold	Janica Kostelić	(United States) 2002 Salt Lake City	Alpine skiing	Women's giant slalom	22 February 2002
Silver	Janica Kostelić	(United States) 2002 Salt Lake City	Alpine skiing	Women's super-G	17 February 2002
Gold	Janica Kostelić	(Italy) 2006 Turin	Alpine skiing	Women's combined	18 February 2006
Silver	Janica Kostelić	(Italy) 2006 Turin	Alpine skiing	Women's super-G	20 February 2006
Silver	Ivica Kostelić	(Italy) 2006 Turin	Alpine skiing	Men's combined	14 February 2006
Silver	Ivica Kostelić	(Canada) 2010 Vancouver	Alpine skiing	Men's combined	21 February 2010
Silver	Ivica Kostelić	(Canada) 2010 Vancouver	Alpine skiing	Men's slalom	27 February 2010
Silver	Ivica Kostelić	(Russia) 2014 Sochi	Alpine skiing	Men's combined	14 February 2014

== See also ==
- Croatia at the Olympics
