= Kolega =

Kolega is a Croatian surname. Notable people with the surname include:

- Elias Kolega (born 1996), Croatian alpine ski racer
- Samuel Kolega (born 1999), Croatian alpine ski racer
