= 2007–08 FIS Alpine Ski World Cup =

International sports competition

FIS Alpine Ski World Cup 2007/08
Discipline	Men	Women
Overall	(United States) Bode Miller	(United States) Lindsey Vonn
Downhill	(Switzerland) Didier Cuche	(United States) Lindsey Vonn
Super-G	(Austria) Hannes Reichelt	(Germany) Maria Riesch
Giant slalom	(United States) Ted Ligety	(Italy) Denise Karbon
Slalom	(Italy) Manfred Mölgg	(Austria) Marlies Schild
Super combined	(United States) Bode Miller	(Germany) Maria Riesch
Nations Cup	Austria	Austria
- Nations Cup Overall: Austria

Competition
Locations	20	18
Individual	40	35
Cancelled	1	2
Rescheduled	2	4

2008 World Cup Champions

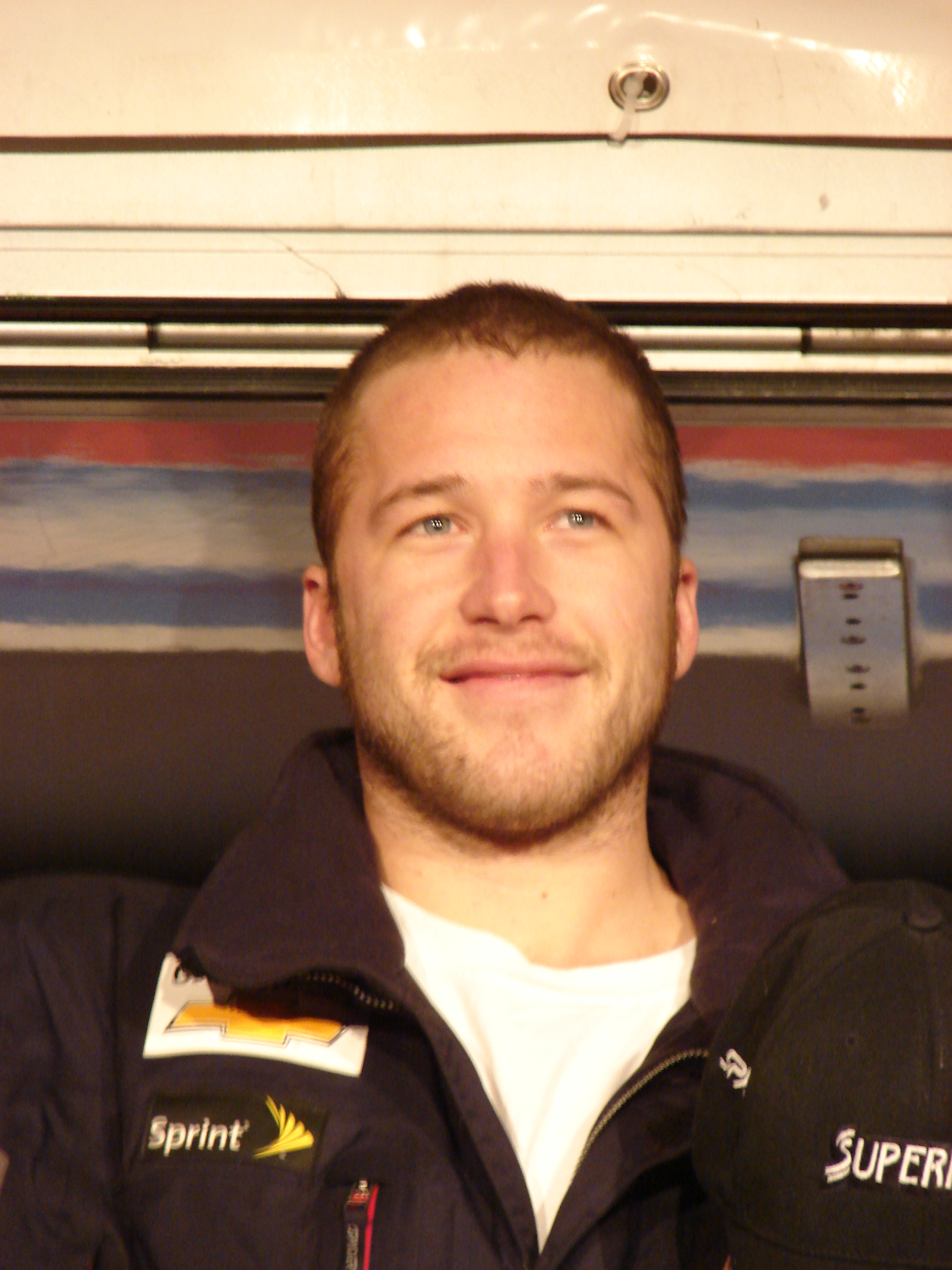
Bode Miller

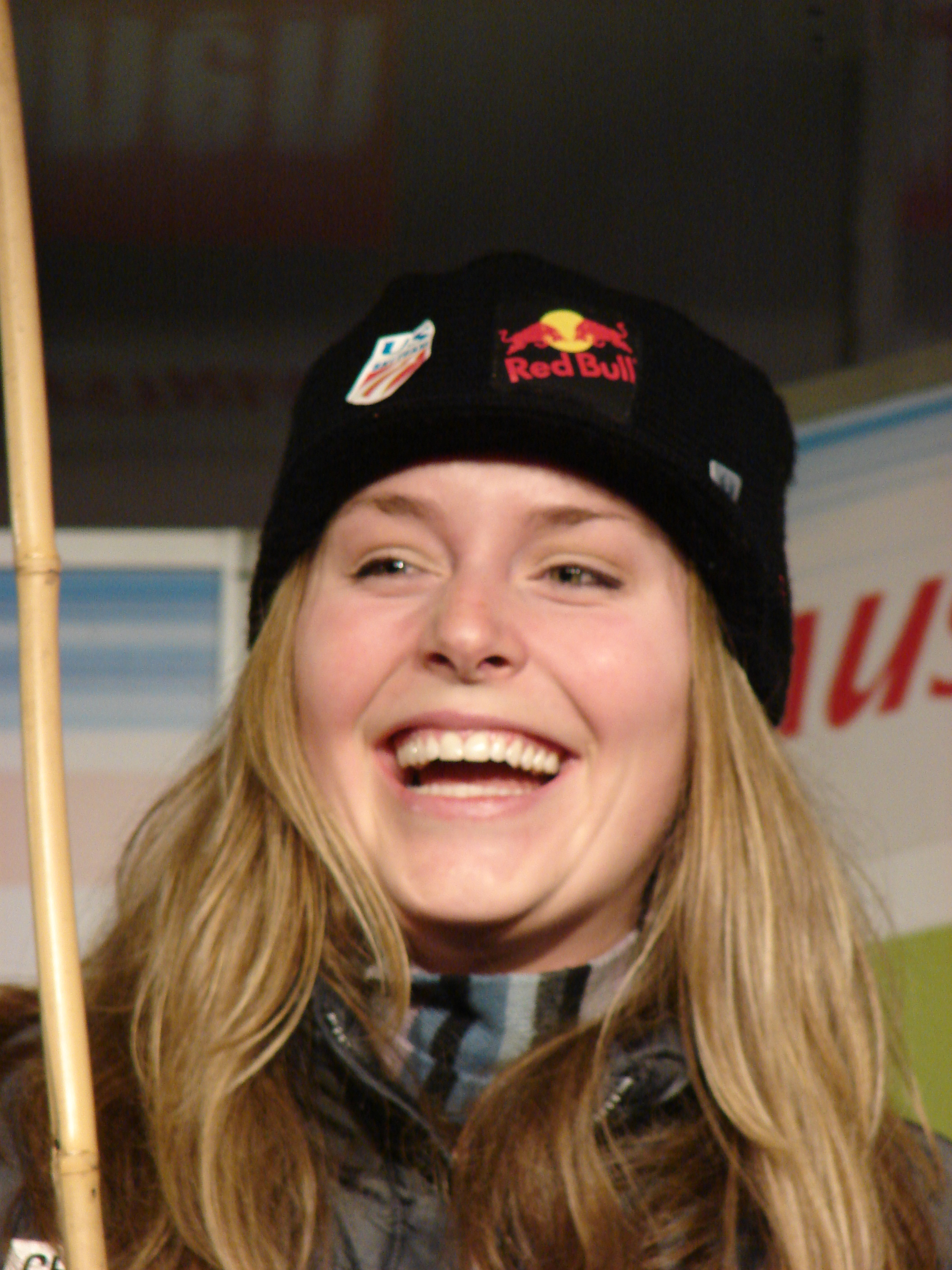
Lindsey Vonn

The 42nd World Cup season began in October 2007 in Sölden, Austria and concluded on 15 March 2008, at the World Cup Finals in Bormio, Italy. (The team event scheduled for the following day was canceled, due to adverse weather conditions.)

The overall champions were Bode Miller and Lindsey Vonn, both of the United States. It was Miller's second overall title and Vonn's first, and the first for an American woman in a quarter century. The last was Tamara McKinney in 1983, which was also the last U.S. sweep as Phil Mahre won his third consecutive overall title.

Miller won the 2008 title by a margin of 111 points over runner-up Benjamin Raich of Austria, while Vonn outpaced her closest rival, Austrian Nicole Hosp, by 220 points. Austria won the Nations Cup for the 20th consecutive season, scoring more than double the points of runner-up Switzerland.

== Calendar ==
=== Men ===
Event key: DH – Downhill, SL – Slalom, GS – Giant slalom, SG – Super giant slalom, KB – Classic Combined, SC – Super combined
Race	Season	Date	Place	Type	Winner	Second	Third
1298	1	28 October 2007	(Austria) Sölden	GS _{318}	(Norway) Aksel Lund Svindal	(United States) Ted Ligety	(Finland) Kalle Palander
		11 November 2007	(Finland) Levi	SL _{cnx}	replaced in Reiteralm on 11 November 2007		
1299	2	(Note: Slalom from Levi was rescheduled to Reiteralm on 11 November 2007)11 November 2007	(Austria) Reiteralm	SL _{371}	(Switzerland) Marc Gini	(Finland) Kalle Palander	(Italy) Manfred Mölgg
1300	3	24 November 2007	(Canada) Lake Louise	DH _{379}	(Canada) Jan Hudec	(United States) Marco Sullivan	(Austria) Andreas Buder
1301	4	25 November 2007	(Canada) Lake Louise	SG _{135}	(Norway) Aksel Lund Svindal	(Austria) Benjamin Raich	(Switzerland) Didier Cuche
1302	5	29 November 2007	(United States) Beaver Creek	SC _{096}	(Switzerland) Daniel Albrecht	(France) Jean-Baptiste Grange	(Czech Republic) Ondřej Bank
1303	6	30 November 2007	(United States) Beaver Creek	DH _{380}	(Austria) Michael Walchhofer	(United States) Steven Nyman	(Switzerland) Didier Cuche
1304	7	2 December 2007	(United States) Beaver Creek	GS _{319}	(Switzerland) Daniel Albrecht	(Austria) Mario Matt	(Switzerland) Didier Cuche
1305	8	3 December 2007	(United States) Beaver Creek	SG _{136}	(Austria) Hannes Reichelt	(Austria) Mario Scheiber	(Austria) Christoph Gruber
1306	9	8 December 2007	(Austria) Bad Kleinkirchheim	GS _{320}	(Italy) Massimiliano Blardone	(Italy) Manfred Mölgg	(United States) Ted Ligety
1307	10	9 December 2007	(Austria) Bad Kleinkirchheim	SL _{372}	(Austria) Benjamin Raich	(Sweden) Jens Byggmark	(Italy) Manfred Mölgg
1308	11	14 December 2007	(Italy) Val Gardena	SG _{137}	(Switzerland) Didier Cuche	(United States) Bode Miller	(Liechtenstein) Marco Büchel
1309	12	15 December 2007	(Italy) Val Gardena	DH _{381}	(Austria) Michael Walchhofer	(Switzerland) Didier Cuche	(United States) Scott Macartney
1310	13	16 December 2007	(Italy) Alta Badia	GS _{321}	(Finland) Kalle Palander	(Austria) Benjamin Raich	(Switzerland) Marc Berthod
1311	14	17 December 2007	(Italy) Alta Badia	SL _{373}	(France) Jean-Baptiste Grange	(Germany) Felix Neureuther	(United States) Ted Ligety
1312	15	29 December 2007	(Italy) Bormio	DH _{382}	(United States) Bode Miller	(Austria) Andreas Buder	(Canada) Jan Hudec
1313	16	5 January 2008	(Switzerland) Adelboden	GS _{322}	(Switzerland) Marc Berthod	(Switzerland) Daniel Albrecht	(Austria) Hannes Reichelt
1314	17	6 January 2008	(Switzerland) Adelboden	SL _{374}	(Austria) Mario Matt	(Austria) Benjamin Raich	(Germany) Felix Neureuther
1315	18	11 January 2008	(Switzerland) Wengen	SC _{097}	(France) Jean-Baptiste Grange	(Switzerland) Daniel Albrecht	(United States) Bode Miller
1316	19	12 January 2008	(Switzerland) Wengen	SL _{375}	(France) Jean-Baptiste Grange	(Sweden) Jens Byggmark	(United States) Ted Ligety
1317	20	13 January 2008	(Switzerland) Wengen	DH _{383}	(United States) Bode Miller	(Switzerland) Didier Cuche	(Canada) Manuel Osborne-Paradis
1318	21	18 January 2008	(Austria) Kitzbühel	SG _{138}	(Liechtenstein) Marco Büchel	(Austria) Hermann Maier	(Switzerland) Didier Cuche (Austria) Mario Scheiber
1319	22	19 January 2008	(Austria) Kitzbühel	DH _{384}	(Switzerland) Didier Cuche	(United States) Bode Miller (Austria) Mario Scheiber	
1320	23	20 January 2008	(Austria) Kitzbühel	SL _{376}	(France) Jean-Baptiste Grange	(Sweden) Jens Byggmark	(Austria) Mario Matt
1321	24	20 January 2008	(Austria) Kitzbühel	KB _{098}	(United States) Bode Miller	(Austria) Benjamin Raich	(Croatia) Ivica Kostelić (Austria) Rainer Schönfelder
1322	25	22 January 2008	(Austria) Schladming	SL _{377}	(Austria) Mario Matt	(France) Jean-Baptiste Grange	(Italy) Manfred Mölgg
1323	26	26 January 2008	(France) Chamonix	DH _{385}	(United States) Marco Sullivan	(Switzerland) Didier Cuche	(Slovenia) Andrej Jerman
1324	27	27 January 2008	(France) Chamonix	SC _{099}	(United States) Bode Miller	(Croatia) Ivica Kostelić	(Austria) Rainer Schönfelder
		2 February 2008	(France) Val d'Isère	DH _{cnx}	replaced in Kvitfjell on 29 February 2008		
1325	28	3 February 2008	(France) Val d'Isère	SC _{100}	(United States) Bode Miller	(Croatia) Ivica Kostelić	(Croatia) Natko Zrnčić-Dim
1326	29	9 February 2008	(Germany) Garmisch-Partenkirchen	SL _{378}	(Austria) Reinfried Herbst	(Italy) Manfred Mölgg	(Croatia) Ivica Kostelić
1327	30	17 February 2008	(Croatia) Zagreb	SL _{379}	(Austria) Mario Matt	(Croatia) Ivica Kostelić	(Austria) Reinfried Herbst
1328	31	21 February 2008	(Canada) Whistler	SG _{139}	(Austria) Christoph Gruber	(Austria) Hannes Reichelt	(Slovenia) Aleš Gorza
1329	32	24 February 2008	(Canada) Whistler	GS _{323}	(Austria) Hannes Reichelt	(Switzerland) Didier Cuche	(Austria) Benjamin Raich
1330	33	(Note: Downhill from Val d'Isère was rescheduled to Kvitfjell on 29 February 2008)29 February 2008	(Norway) Kvitfjell	DH _{386}	(Italy) Werner Heel	(United States) Bode Miller	(Austria) Klaus Kröll
1331	34	1 March 2008	(Norway) Kvitfjell	DH _{387}	(United States) Bode Miller	(Switzerland) Didier Cuche	(Italy) Werner Heel
1332	35	2 March 2008	(Norway) Kvitfjell	SG _{140}	(Austria) Georg Streitberger	(United States) Bode Miller	(Switzerland) Didier Cuche
1333	36	8 March 2008	(Slovenia) Kranjska Gora	GS _{324}	(United States) Ted Ligety	(Italy) Manfred Mölgg	(Italy) Massimiliano Blardone
1334	37	9 March 2008	(Slovenia) Kranjska Gora	SL _{380}	(Italy) Manfred Mölgg	(Croatia) Ivica Kostelić	(Austria) Marcel Hirscher
		12 March 2008	(Italy) Bormio	DH _{cnx}	warm weather and deteriorated course conditions		
1335	38	13 March 2008	(Italy) Bormio	SG _{141}	(Austria) Hannes Reichelt	(Switzerland) Didier Défago	(Slovenia) Aleš Gorza
1336	39	14 March 2008	(Italy) Bormio	GS _{325}	(United States) Ted Ligety	(Austria) Benjamin Raich	(France) Cyprien Richard
1337	40	15 March 2008	(Italy) Bormio	SL _{381}	(Austria) Reinfried Herbst	(Switzerland) Daniel Albrecht	(Austria) Marcel Hirscher

=== Ladies ===
Event key: DH – Downhill, SL – Slalom, GS – Giant slalom, SG – Super giant slalom, SC – Super combined
Race	Season	Date	Place	Type	Winner	Second	Third
1217	1	27 October 2007	(Austria) Sölden	GS _{318}	(Italy) Denise Karbon	(United States) Julia Mancuso	(Austria) Kathrin Zettel
		10 November 2007	(Finland) Levi	SL _{cnx}	replaced in Reiteralm on 10 November 2007		
1218	2	(Note: Slalom from Levi was rescheduled to Reiteralm on 10 November 2007)10 November 2007	(Austria) Reiteralm	SL _{356}	(Austria) Marlies Schild	(Austria) Nicole Hosp	(Italy) Chiara Costazza
1219	3	24 November 2007	(Canada) Panorama	GS _{319}	(Italy) Denise Karbon	(Austria) Elisabeth Görgl	(Italy) Manuela Mölgg
1220	4	25 November 2007	(Canada) Panorama	SL _{357}	(Austria) Marlies Schild	(Czech Republic) Šárka Záhrobská	(Croatia) Ana Jelušić
1221	5	1 December 2007	(Canada) Lake Louise	DH _{313}	(United States) Lindsey Vonn	(Austria) Renate Götschl	(Canada) Britt Janyk
1222	6	2 December 2007	(Canada) Lake Louise	SG _{151}	(Switzerland) Martina Schild	(Germany) Maria Riesch	(Sweden) Jessica Lindell-Vikarby
1223	7	8 December 2007	(United States) Aspen	DH _{314}	(Canada) Britt Janyk	(Austria) Marlies Schild	(Austria) Renate Götschl
		8 December 2007	(United States) Aspen	SG _{cnx}	replaced in Cortina d'Ampezzo from 18 to 21 January 2008		
1224	8	9 December 2007	(United States) Aspen	SL _{358}	(Austria) Nicole Hosp	(Finland) Tanja Poutiainen	(Austria) Kathrin Zettel
		15 December 2007	(France) Val d'Isère	DH _{cnx}	replaced in St. Moritz on 15 December 2007		
		16 December 2007	(France) Val d'Isère	SG _{cnx}	replaced in St. Moritz on 16 December 2007		
1225	9	(Note: Downhill from Val d'Isère was rescheduled to St. Moritz on 15 December 2007)15 December 2007	(Switzerland) St. Moritz	DH _{315}	(Sweden) Anja Pärson	(United States) Lindsey Vonn	(Germany) Maria Riesch
1226	10	(Note: Super giant slalom from Val d'Isère was rescheduled to St. Moritz on 16 December 2007)16 December 2007	(Switzerland) St. Moritz	SG _{152}	(Sweden) Anja Pärson	(Canada) Emily Brydon	(Austria) Renate Götschl
1227	11	21 December 2007	(Austria) St. Anton	DH _{316}	(United States) Lindsey Vonn	(Canada) Kelly VanderBeek	(United States) Julia Mancuso
1228	12	22 December 2007	(Austria) St. Anton	SC _{079}	(United States) Lindsey Vonn	(Germany) Maria Riesch	(United States) Julia Mancuso
1229	13	28 December 2007	(Austria) Lienz	GS _{320}	(Italy) Denise Karbon	(United States) Julia Mancuso	(Italy) Nicole Gius
1230	14	29 December 2007	(Austria) Lienz	SL _{359}	(Italy) Chiara Costazza	(Austria) Nicole Hosp	(Finland) Tanja Poutiainen
1231	15	5 January 2008	(Czech Republic) Špindlerův Mlýn	GS _{321}	(Italy) Denise Karbon	(Finland) Tanja Poutiainen	(Austria) Elisabeth Görgl
1232	16	6 January 2008	(Czech Republic) Špindlerův Mlýn	SL _{360}	(Austria) Marlies Schild	(Slovakia) Veronika Zuzulová	(Germany) Maria Riesch
1233	17	12 January 2008	(Slovenia) Maribor	GS _{322}	(Austria) Elisabeth Görgl	(Italy) Manuela Mölgg	(Italy) Denise Karbon
1234	18	13 January 2008	(Slovenia) Maribor	SL _{361}	(Austria) Nicole Hosp	(Slovakia) Veronika Zuzulová	(Austria) Marlies Schild
1235	19	19 January 2008	(Italy) Cortina d'Ampezzo	DH _{317}	(United States) Lindsey Vonn	(Sweden) Anja Pärson	(Canada) Emily Brydon
1236	20	20 January 2008	(Italy) Cortina d'Ampezzo	SG _{153}	(Austria) Maria Holaus	(United States) Julia Mancuso	(Austria) Nicole Hosp
1237	21	(Note: Super giant slalom from Cortina d'Ampezzo was rescheduled to Aspen from 18 to 21 January 2008)21 January 2008	(Italy) Cortina d'Ampezzo	SG _{154}	(Germany) Maria Riesch	(Austria) Elisabeth Görgl	(Austria) Renate Götschl
1238	22	26 January 2008	(Germany) Ofterschwang	GS _{323}	(Italy) Denise Karbon	(Austria) Nicole Hosp	(Austria) Elisabeth Görgl
1239	23	27 January 2008	(Germany) Ofterschwang	SL _{362}	(Austria) Marlies Schild	(Sweden) Therese Borssen	(Austria) Nicole Hosp
1240	24	2 February 2008	(Switzerland) St. Moritz	DH _{318}	(Slovenia) Tina Maze	(Austria) Maria Holaus	(Switzerland) Lara Gut
1241	25	3 February 2008	(Switzerland) St. Moritz	SG _{155}	(Canada) Emily Brydon	(Austria) Elisabeth Görgl	(Austria) Renate Götschl
1242	26	9 February 2008	(Italy) Sestriere	DH _{319}	(United States) Lindsey Vonn	(Canada) Kelly VanderBeek	(Italy) Nadia Fanchini
1243	27	10 February 2008	(Italy) Sestriere	SG _{156}	(Austria) Andrea Fischbacher (Switzerland) Fabienne Suter		(Germany) Maria Riesch
1244	28	15 February 2008	(Croatia) Zagreb	SL _{363}	(Finland) Tanja Poutiainen	(Austria) Marlies Schild	(Slovakia) Veronika Zuzulová
1245	29	22 February 2008	(Canada) Whistler	DH _{320}	(Switzerland) Nadia Styger	(United States) Lindsey Vonn	(United States) Julia Mancuso
1246	30	23 February 2008	(Canada) Whistler	SC _{080}	(Germany) Maria Riesch	(Austria) Marlies Schild	(Sweden) Anja Pärson
		1 March 2008	(Germany) Zwiesel	SL _{cnx}	lightning & high winds		
		2 March 2008	(Germany) Zwiesel	GS _{cnx}	lightning & high winds		
1247	31	8 March 2008	(Switzerland) Crans-Montana	DH _{321}	(United States) Lindsey Vonn	(Austria) Renate Götschl	(Italy) Nadia Fanchini
1248	32	9 March 2008	(Switzerland) Crans-Montana	SC _{081}	(Sweden) Anja Pärson	(Germany) Maria Riesch	(United States) Lindsey Vonn
		12 March 2008	(Italy) Bormio	DH _{cnx}	warm weather & deteriorated course conditions		
1249	33	13 March 2008	(Italy) Bormio	SG _{157}	(Switzerland) Fabienne Suter	(United States) Lindsey Vonn	(Austria) Alexandra Meissnitzer
1250	34	14 March 2008	(Italy) Bormio	SL _{364}	(Austria) Marlies Schild	(Slovakia) Veronika Zuzulová	(Czech Republic) Šárka Záhrobská
1251	35	15 March 2008	(Italy) Bormio	GS _{324}	(Austria) Elisabeth Görgl	(Italy) Manuela Mölgg	(Austria) Kathrin Zettel

=== Nations team event ===
Event key: SC – Super combined (super-G + slalom)
Race	Season	Date	Place	Type	Winner	Second	Third|
		16 March 2008	(Italy) Bormio	SC _{cnx}	fog and rain		

== Men's standings ==
=== Overall ===
Rank	after all 40 races	Points
1	(United States) Bode Miller	1409
2	(Austria) Benjamin Raich	1298
3	(Switzerland) Didier Cuche	1263
4	(Italy) Manfred Mölgg	924
5	(United States) Ted Ligety	898

=== Downhill ===
Rank	after all 9 races	Points
1	(Switzerland) Didier Cuche	584
2	(United States) Bode Miller	579
3	(Austria) Michael Walchhofer	407
4	(United States) Marco Sullivan	278
5	(Italy) Werner Heel	273

=== Super G ===
Rank	after all 7 races	Points
1	(Austria) Hannes Reichelt	341
2	(Switzerland) Didier Cuche	340
3	(Austria) Benjamin Raich	286
4	(Switzerland) Didier Défago	262
5	(Austria) Christoph Gruber	251

=== Giant slalom ===
Rank	after all 8 races	Points
1	(United States) Ted Ligety	485
2	(Austria) Benjamin Raich	438
3	(Italy) Manfred Mölgg	376
4	(Switzerland) Didier Cuche	293
5	(Switzerland) Daniel Albrecht	284

=== Slalom ===
Rank	after all 11 races	Points
1	(Italy) Manfred Mölgg	531
2	(France) Jean-Baptiste Grange	512
3	(Austria) Reinfried Herbst	450
4	(Austria) Mario Matt	427
5	(Croatia) Ivica Kostelić	425

=== Super combined ===
Rank	after all 5 races	Points
1	(United States) Bode Miller	410
2	(Croatia) Ivica Kostelić	256
3	(Switzerland) Daniel Albrecht	245
4	(France) Jean-Baptiste Grange	220
5	(Austria) Rainer Schönfelder	206

== Ladies' standings ==
=== Overall ===
Rank	after all 35 races	Points
1	(United States) Lindsey Vonn	1403
2	(Austria) Nicole Hosp	1183
3	(Germany) Maria Riesch	1146
4	(Austria) Elisabeth Görgl	1137
5	(Austria) Marlies Schild	1120

=== Downhill ===
Rank	after all 9 races	Points
1	(United States) Lindsey Vonn	755
2	(Austria) Renate Götschl	448
3	(Canada) Britt Janyk	390
4	(Sweden) Anja Pärson	331
5	(Canada) Kelly VanderBeek	323

=== Super G ===
Rank	after all 7 races	Points
1	(Germany) Maria Riesch	374
2	(Austria) Elisabeth Görgl	326
3	(Switzerland) Fabienne Suter	305
4	(Austria) Renate Götschl	283
5	(Canada) Emily Brydon	270

=== Giant slalom ===
Rank	after all 7 races	Points
1	(Italy) Denise Karbon	592
2	(Austria) Elisabeth Görgl	479
3	(Italy) Manuela Mölgg	359
4	(Finland) Tanja Poutiainen	297
5	(United States) Julia Mancuso	253

=== Slalom ===
Rank	after all 9 races	Points
1	(Austria) Marlies Schild	640
2	(Austria) Nicole Hosp	515
3	(Slovakia) Veronika Zuzulová	501
4	(Finland) Tanja Poutiainen	484
5	(Czech Republic) Šárka Záhrobská	392

=== Super combined ===
Rank	after all 3 races	Points
1	(Germany) Maria Riesch	260
2	(United States) Lindsey Vonn	200
3	(Sweden) Anja Pärson	160
4	(France) Sandrine Aubert	110
5	(Austria) Marlies Schild	106

== Nations Cup ==
=== Overall ===
Rank	after all 75 races	Points
1	Austria	13560
2	Switzerland	6458
3	Italy	6324
4	United States	5965
5	France	3815

=== Men ===
Rank	after all 40 races	Points
1	Austria	7003
2	Switzerland	4064
3	Italy	3721
4	United States	3202
5	France	2382

=== Ladies ===
Rank	after all 35 races	Points
1	Austria	6557
2	United States	2763
3	Italy	2603
4	Switzerland	2394
5	Germany	2100
