= Ivica Kostelić =

Croatian alpine skier (born 1979)

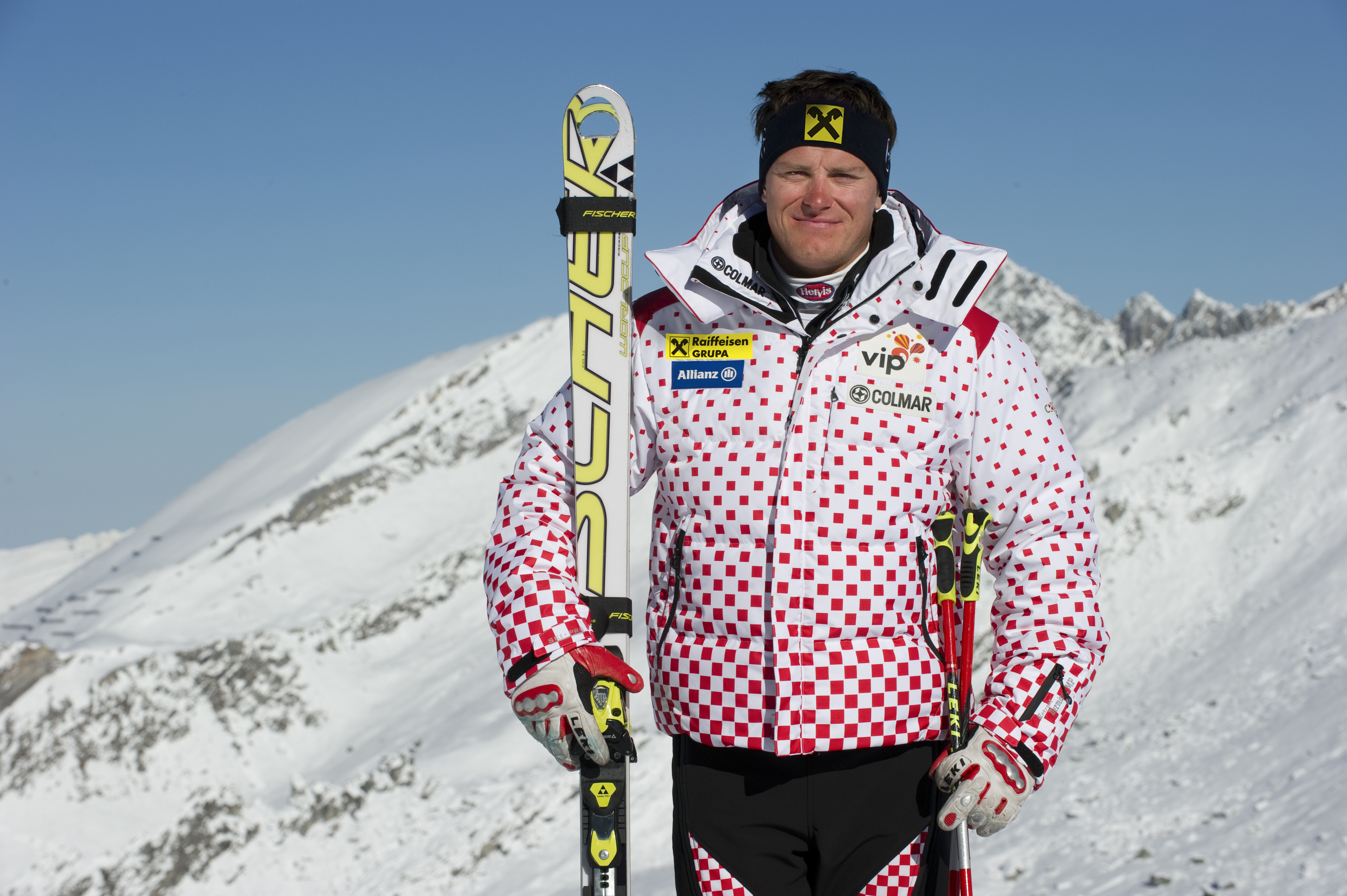
- Kostelić in October 2010

Personal information
- Born: 23 November 1979 (age 46) Zagreb, SR Croatia, SFR Yugoslavia
- Height: 1.82 m (6 ft 0 in)
- Website: ivica.kostelic.hr

Skiing career
- Sport: Alpine skiing ♂
- Club: Ski club Zagreb
- Disciplines: combined, downhill, super-G, giant slalom, slalom

Olympics
- Teams: 4 – (2002–2014)
- Medals: 4

World Cup
- Seasons: 20 – (1998–2017)
- Wins: 26
- Podiums: 60
- Overall titles: 1 – (2011)
- Discipline titles: 5 – (SL in 2002 and 2011, K in 2011, 2012 and 2013)
Medal record
Men's alpine skiing
Representing Croatia
World Cup race podiums
Event	1st	2nd	3rd
Slalom	15	9	16
Giant	0	1	0
Super-G	1	1	1
Combined	9	4	2
Parallel	1	0	1
Total	26	15	20
Event	1st	2nd	3rd
Olympic Games	0	4	0
World Championships	1	1	1
Total	1	5	1
Olympic Games
Silver medal – second place	2006 Turin	Combined
Silver medal – second place	2010 Vancouver	Combined
Silver medal – second place	2010 Vancouver	Slalom
Silver medal – second place	2014 Sochi	Combined
World Championships
Gold medal – first place	2003 St. Moritz	Slalom
Silver medal – second place	2013 Schladming	Combined
Bronze medal – third place	2011 Garmisch	Super-G
Junior World Ski Championships
Bronze medal – third place	1997 Schladming	Combined

Ivica Kostelić (pronounced [ˈiʋitsa ˈkɔstɛlitɕ]; born 23 November 1979) is a Croatian former alpine ski racer. He specialized in slalom and combined, but was also one of the few alpine World Cup ski racers able to score points in all disciplines. He is the brother of skiing champion Janica Kostelić. In his career he was coached by his father Ante Kostelić, as well as by Kristian Ghedina and Tomislav Krstičević.

== Biography ==
After considerable success in junior competitions, Kostelić's World Cup career alternated between triumph and injury. His main accomplishments include a World Championship gold medal in slalom in 2003, Olympic silver medal in slalom in 2010, three consecutive Olympic silver medals in combined in 2006 (traditional combined), 2010 (super combined) and 2014, as well as the overall World Cup title in 2011.

Kostelić scored a total of 26 World Cup race victories and a total of 59 World Cup podiums during his career (as of February 2014). He won the slalom World Cup title in 2002 and 2011, and the combined World Cup title in 2011 and 2012.

Since 2008, he finished among the top six in the overall World Cup standings each season (2008: sixth; 2009: fourth; 2010: fifth; 2011: first; 2012: fourth; 2013: fifth). He also scored points in all disciplines each of those seasons, and his best race results were a seventh place in downhill, a second place in giant slalom, and victories in all other disciplines (11 in slalom, 1 in parallel-slalom, 2 in combined, 4 in super combined, and 1 in super-G).

Ivica Kostelić is currently one of the coaches of the Croatian national team.

== Career ==
=== Early World Cup years (1998–2002) ===
Kostelić made his first World Cup start in October 1998 in Sölden, Austria, at the age of 18, but failed to qualify for a second run. He did not finish any of his first 11 World Cup races over 3 seasons, until finally scoring World Cup points for the first time in Sestriere, Italy, in December 2000. His first three seasons on the World Cup all ended prematurely due to injuries, failing to make it past December or January each season.

=== Breakthrough (2002–2005) ===
His big breakthrough came during the 2002 season, when he shockingly won the slalom at Aspen, Colorado, in November 2001 starting from the 64th bib number, his first finish higher than 21st place in any World Cup race. He won two more slaloms that season, and had three additional podiums (top 3), enough to clinch the slalom season title over Bode Miller while avoiding season-ending injury for the first time in his career.

Kostelić would continue his success during the next season, winning three more slalom races by mid-season, and adding a gold medal in slalom in February at the 2003 World Championships in St. Moritz, Switzerland. He would narrowly miss repeating his slalom title, falling to second place as Kalle Palander won four consecutive slaloms in late season to clinch the globe. He would go on to win another slalom race during the 2003–2004 season, the 7th win of his career, before injuries again ended his season prematurely in January. He would return to World Cup competition in time for the start of the 2004–2005 season, but would fail to finish any of his first 7 races that year. Despite a pair of podiums later that season and occasional top-10 finishes, he would not win another World Cup race for nearly three years.

=== Resurgence as all-event skier (2006–2010) ===
Kostelić began his World Cup career as a technical specialist, racing only slalom and GS (with an occasional super-G), but started to ski more often the speed events including downhill during the 2006 season, primarily in order to compete in the new format of super combined, which consists of single runs of downhill and slalom. He did win a Nor-Am downhill in December 1998 at Lake Louise, Canada. As his sister Janica, 'Ivo' has always been aiming to become a complete racer able to excel in all specialties. He scored his first World Cup points at Kitzbuehel, Austria, finishing 29th on the 'Streif' in January 2008. A week later he was 8th in the downhill at Chamonix, in France. His broadened portfolio brought quick dividends, with a silver medal in the combined (a traditional combined with a single downhill and two runs of slalom) at the 2006 Winter Olympics in Torino, Italy, in February. He would follow that success during the 2007 World Cup season with a win in the super combined in Reiteralm, Austria, in December 2006, his eighth World Cup win and first other than slalom.

Starting with the 2008 season, Kostelić joined the select group of World Cup racers able to excel in all disciplines. Although he failed to win any World Cup races during the 2008 season, he finished second 4 times and third twice in slalom and super combined events, and for the first time scored points in all disciplines. He would finish second in the combined standings and sixth in the overall. The next season brought another win in slalom, along with three more second places (including in GS for his first time) and a pair of thirds, as he moved up to fourth in the overall standings while again taking second in the slalom standings. Success in all disciplines continued in the 2010 season, with two more World Cup wins in slalom and combined (for a total of 11 in his career) along with a second in super-G, his first podium in a speed event. At the 2010 Winter Olympics in Whistler, he won a pair of silver medals, in slalom and combined.

=== Overall World Cup title (2011) ===
Kostelić's skiing would reach another level during the 2011 season. Following a third in the season-opening slalom in November at Levi, Finland, he suffered a string of mediocre finishes outside the top-10 for the rest of 2010. Then he opened the New Year with a victory in the first-ever Munich City Event parallel slalom on 2 January, and took second place four days later in the slalom in his hometown of Zagreb. He followed that up with three more wins over the next two weeks in slalom and super combined at Adelboden and Wengen, Switzerland, to take the lead in the overall World Cup standings for the first time. At the Hahnenkamm races in Kitzbühel, Austria, he had victories in super-G and combined, plus a second place in slalom, which opened a gap of more than 400 points over his nearest competitors in the overall ranking. A week later, he won the super combined in Chamonix, France, his third straight win in combined and clinching the combined title for the season with one race still remaining. It was his seventh victory of January 2011, the most by any alpine ski racer in a single calendar month in World Cup history, and he scored points in all 14 World Cup races held in January, including two seconds and two fifths along with top-30 finishes in all three downhills, for a total of 999 points in January alone.

After the stunning success of January, Kostelić's results tailed off considerably and he would fail to finish higher than fifth in any of the remaining 10 World Cup races on the season. In February, Kostelić won a bronze medal in super-G at the 2011 World Championships in Garmisch, but finished only 8th and 13th in the slalom and giant slalom after he sustained a knee injury in the second giant slalom run. He had chosen not to race the World Championships downhill or the super combined (in which he was the clear favorite to win the gold medal) in order to avoid injury on the extremely icy course. On 12 March, five races before the end of the season, he clinched his first overall World Cup title, and he would clinch the slalom title at the final race in Lenzerheide, Switzerland on 19 March, despite finishing out of the points that day. Kostelić would win a total of three crystal globes for the 2011 season including the overall, slalom, and combined titles.

=== Defending the overall World Cup title (2012) ===
In the 2012 season Kostelić had a better start than the year before, winning two slaloms in December. His next victories were the super combined and the slalom at Wengen, and the following weekend he won also the classical combined of the Hahnenkamm races (downhill and slalom) in Kitzbühel, where he took the overall lead for the first time that season. However, in February 2012 he sustained an injury and missed 11 races, including two classic slaloms and one parallel, in Stockholm. In the meantime, Marcel Hirscher took the lead in the overall standings and would go on to claim his first overall title. Kostelić returned to action in Schladming at the end of the season, and competed only in slalom. He finished 16th and André Myhrer took the slalom title.

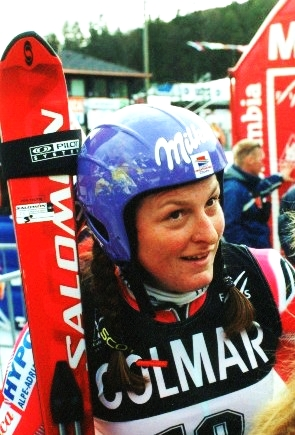
Janica Kostelić

== Personal life ==
Born and raised in Zagreb, his parents, Ante and Marica, are former elite team handball players. They taught Ivica and his sister Janica, two years younger, to ski on the nearby hill Sljeme (now the site of the annual Snow Queen Trophy World Cup races). Janica Kostelić also became an accomplished skier, and Ante Kostelić remained their primary ski coach throughout their careers, and was the head coach of the Croatian ski team.

In 2006 Kostelić passed the entrance exam at the University of Zagreb to become a part-time undergraduate student of history.

In 2014 Kostelić married his longtime girlfriend Elin Arnarsdóttir, a native of Iceland. In October she gave birth to their first child, a son Ivan. In July 2016 Elin gave birth to their second child, a son Leon. In March 2020 they had twin daughters - Jana and Kata.

=== Nacional article ===
In January 2003, after winning the slalom at Kranjska Gora, Kostelić told the reporters that before the race he had felt "powerful, all-conquering, like a German soldier ready for battle in 1941", in reference to the June 1941 German invasion of the Soviet Union. Although the Croatian media had largely ignored the statement, the weekly tabloid Nacional picked up the story and published an article featuring previously unreleased statements made by Kostelić from an interview that he gave to the weekly in May 2002. According to Nacional Kostelić said that he was "fascinated" with the scale of the World War II Luftwaffe attack on Britain and gave an opinion on the differences between national socialism and communism saying that "Nationalism was still a healthy system for someone who was ambitious. In communism, we weren’t permitted to be ambitious, and both systems were totalitarian."

His remarks were interpreted by the weekly as a sign of far-right political leanings and the story attracted attention from international press. Kostelić then issued a statement claiming that the sentences published by Nacional were taken out of context and that they were made in informal conversation conducted after the formal interview, and added that "my heart is neither left- nor right-oriented, only towards sports, and my mind is only on skiing".

Other journalists had dismissed his original statement as nothing more than a badly chosen metaphor due to the fact that both Ivica and his father Ante are avid World War II buffs. Since 2002 Ante Kostelić owns a publishing house which published the Croatian edition of the award-winning book Stalingrad by Antony Beevor. In April 2010, the company also published a book Waffen-SS, mračne sile zločinačke politike (Waffen-SS, the Dark Forces of Criminal Politics) by Hrvoje Spajić about the Waffen-SS which Ante Kostelić had edited.

== World Cup results ==
=== Season titles ===
- 6 titles – 1 overall, 2 Slalom, 3 Combined

Season	Discipline
2002	Slalom
2011	Overall
2011	Combined
2011	Slalom
2012	Combined
2013	Combined ^{A}

^{A} Unofficial, tied with Alexis Pinturault.

=== Season standings ===
Season	Age	Overall	Slalom	Giant slalom	Super-G	Downhill	Combined
2001	21	107	40	—	—	—	—
2002	22	7	1	22	—	—	—
2003	23	7	2	27	—	—	—
2004	24	34	14	30	37	—	—
2005	25	31	7	—	—	—	—
2006	26	40	15	—	—	—	16
2007	27	25	16	—	—	—	3
2008	28	6	5	40	25	35	2
2009	29	4	2	8	26	47	4
2010	30	5	4	21	15	23	3
2011	31	1	1	11	3	25	1
2012	32	4	2	23	—	43	1
2013	33	5	3	14	28	44	1 ^{[A]}
2014	34	42	16	32	34	—	30
2015	35	50	31	—	—	59	4
2016	36	105	—	—	—	—	20
2017	37	139	—	—	—	—	35

^{A} Crystal globes in Combined have not been officially awarded for 2013 season. However, athletes still get their medals.

=== Race victories ===
- 26 wins – 15 slalom, 9 combined (5 super combined, 4 traditional), 1 parallel slalom, 1 super-G

Season	Date	Location	Discipline
2002	25 November 2001	Aspen, USA	Slalom
2002	13 January 2002	Wengen, Switzerland	Slalom
2002	9 March 2002	Flachau, Austria	Slalom
2003	16 December 2002	Sestriere, Italy	Slalom
2003	5 January 2003	Kranjska Gora, Slovenia	Slalom
2003	12 January 2003	Bormio, Italy	Slalom
2004	15 December 2003	Madonna di Campiglio, Italy	Slalom
2007	10 December 2006	Reiteralm, Austria	Super combined
2009	22 December 2008	Alta Badia, Italy	Slalom
2010	17 January 2010	Wengen, Switzerland	Slalom
2010	24 January 2010	Kitzbühel, Austria	Combined
2011	2 January 2011	Munich, Germany	Parallel slalom
2011	9 January 2011	Adelboden, Switzerland	Slalom
2011	14 January 2011	Wengen, Switzerland	Super combined
2011	16 January 2011	Wengen, Switzerland	Slalom
2011	21 January 2011	Kitzbühel, Austria	Super-G
2011	23 January 2011	Kitzbühel, Austria	Combined
2011	30 January 2011	Chamonix, France	Super combined
2012	8 December 2011	Beaver Creek, USA	Slalom
2012	21 December 2011	Flachau, Austria	Slalom
2012	13 January 2012	Wengen, Switzerland	Super combined
2012	15 January 2012	Wengen, Switzerland	Slalom
2012	22 January 2012	Kitzbühel, Austria	Combined
2012	12 February 2012	Sochi, Russia	Super combined
2013	27 January 2013	Kitzbühel, Austria	Combined
2013	10 March 2013	Kranjska Gora, Slovenia	Slalom

== World Championships results ==
Year	Age	Slalom	Giant slalom	Super-G	Downhill	Combined
1999	19	—	—	32	—	—
2001	21	—	—	—	—	—
2003	23	1	DNF1	—	—	—
2005	25	DNF1	—	—	—	—
2007	27	DNF2	DSQ1	—	—	12
2009	29	—	DNS1	—	—	—
2011	31	8	13	3	—	—
2013	33	5	25	28	20	2
2015	35	15	—	DNF	—	12
2017	37	38	—	—	—	—

== Olympic results ==
Olympics	Age	Downhill	Super-G	Giant slalom	Slalom	Combined
2002 Salt Lake City	22	—	—	9th	DNF	—
2006 Turin	26	—	31st	—	6th	2
2010 Vancouver	30	18th	16th	7th	2	2
2014 Sochi	34	—	24th	27th	9th	2

== Podiums per discipline ==
Discipline	1st	2nd	3rd	Total podiums
Slalom	16	10	16	42
Giant slalom	0	1	0	1
Super-G	1	1	1	3
Combined	4	2	1	7
Super combined	5	6	1	12
Parallel slalom	1	0	1	2
Total podiums	27	20	20	67

NOTE: This table counts all career races in A-team, including FIS World Cup, FIS World Championships and Winter Olympics.

== See also ==
- List of multiple Olympic gold medalists
- List of multiple Olympic gold medalists at a single Games
- Ante Kostelić
- Croatian national alpine ski team

Winter Olympics
Preceded by Jakov Fak	Flagbearer for Croatia; Sochi 2014	Succeeded by Natko Zrnčić-Dim
