= Aleš Gorza =

Slovenian alpine skier (born 1980)

Personal information
- Born: 20 June 1980 (age 46) Slovenj Gradec, SFR Yugoslavia
- Height: 1.79 m (5 ft 10 in)

Skiing career
- Sport: Alpine skiing
- Club: CRN - SK Crna
- Disciplines: Super-G, combined, giant slalom
- World Cup debut: 21 December 2001

Olympics
- Medals: 0 (0 gold)

World Championships
- Medals: 0 (0 gold)

World Cup
- Seasons: 9
- Wins: 0
- Podiums: 2
- Overall titles: 0
- Discipline titles: 0

Aleš Gorza (born 20 July 1980) is a retired Slovenian alpine skier.

Gorza represented Slovenia at the 2006 Winter Olympics. His World Cup debut was on 21 December 2001 in Kranjska Gora. His best results so far are two 3rd places in Super-G, one in Whistler, British Columbia and in Bormio, Italy, in 2008.

He retired in 2012 after being dropped from Slovenian national ski team.

== World Cup results ==
=== Season standings ===
Season	Age	Overall	Slalom	Giant slalom	Super-G	Downhill	Combined
2003	22	102	48	46	—	—	—
2004	23	116	56	45	—	—	—
2005	24	64	—	18	—	—	—
2006	25	70	40	31	—	—	38
2007	26	60	59	23	—	—	16
2008	27	31	—	24	13	—	15
2009	28	63	—	34	28	—	20
2010	29	70	—	42	19	—	—
2011	30	139	—	—	41	—	—

=== Race podiums ===
Season	Date	Location	Discipline	Position
2008	21 February 2008	Whistler, Canada	Super-G	3rd
2008	13 March 2008	Bormio, Italy	Super-G	3rd
