= Ante Kostelić =

Croatian handball player and coach

Personal information
- Nickname: Gips
- Nationality: Croatian
- Born: 11 August 1938 (age 87) Zagreb, Yugoslavia
- Education: Zagreb Faculty of Kinesiology
- Occupations: Alpine skiing coach; handball coach
- Years active: 1957–present
- Spouse: Marica Kostelić

Sport
- Country: Croatia
- Sport: Alpine skiing; handball; swimming; car racing
- Position: Handball circle runner (pivot, line player) or left winger
- Club: SK Medveščak; SK Zagreb; RK Polet Zagreb; RK Mladost Zagreb; RK Zagreb; AS Cannes; ŽRK Osijek; PK Mladost Zagreb, etc.
- Now coaching: Elias Kolega, Samuel Kolega

Achievements and titles
- Olympic finals: Four gold and six silver Olympic medals (coaching Janica and Ivica Kostelić)
- World finals: 1981–82 IHF Women's Cup Winners' Cup winner (as ŽRK Osijek head coach); 6 gold + 1 silver + 1 bronze FIS Alpine World Ski Championships medals and 4 overall FIS Alpine World Cups (coaching Janica and Ivica Kostelić)

Ante Kostelić (born 11 August 1938) is a Croatian former handball player, and handball and skier coach. He is best known for coaching his children, Croatian skiers Janica and Ivica Kostelić, who won the FIS Alpine World Ski Championships, overall FIS Alpine World Cup and Olympic titles between 2001 and 2014. As head coach of the ŽRK Osijek handball club he won the 1981–82 IHF Women's Cup Winners' Cup. He has been honoured with numerous awards including the Croatian Olympic Committee's Matija Ljubek Award (2001), Franjo Bučar State Award for Sport (2003) and the Order of Duke Branimir.

== Early life ==
Born in Zagreb, Ante Kostelić attended Grammar school in his home town and later graduated from the Faculty of Kinesiology. He played handball for several clubs in Croatia (then within Yugoslavia), e.g. RK Polet Zagreb, RK Mladost Zagreb, RK Zagreb, as well as in France (AS Cannes). His player positions were circle runner (pivot, line player) or left winger. As an RK Zagreb player, he won the Yugoslav Handball Cup in 1962. He was also active in swimming, skiing and car racing.

== Coaching career ==
From the 1970s to the 1990s, Kostelić coached many handball clubs, including RK Ivanić Ivanić-Grad, RK Medveščak Zagreb, RK Zagreb, RK Partizan Bjelovar, RK Trešnjevka Zagreb, RK Celje, ŽRK Osijek, RK Pelister Bitola and 1. FC Nürnberg Nuremberg. In his coaching career, he first became famous for his triumph in the 1981–82 IHF Women's Cup Winners' Cup as ŽRK Osijek Handball Club head coach. In the final, ŽRK Osijek beat SC Spartacus from Budapest 54:38 on aggregate.

At the beginning of the 1990s he became an alpine skiing coach, starting with the ski clubs SK Medveščak and SK Zagreb. He was known as a very tough and demanding coach and therefore sometimes got into confrontations with other club members or parents of the skiers, who thought he demanded too much from his trainees. Then he took over coaching his children Janica and Ivica), who succeeded at the highest levels of the sport, becoming world alpine ski world champions as well as World Cup and Olympic winners. Together they were awarded four gold and six silver Olympic medals. In April 2017 it was announced that Kostelić would become coach of the Croatian alpine skiers Elias and Samuel Kolega.

== Honours and awards ==
Ante Kostelić has been honoured by the Croatian Olympic Committee (transl. COC, Croatian: HOO) with the Matija Ljubek Award, the highest COC prize, awarded to individuals as a lifetime achievement, in 2001. Two years later he was honoured with the Franjo Bučar State Award for Sport, the highest recognition that Republic of Croatia gives for extraordinary achievements in the field of sport in Croatia. In 2010 he received the Order of Prince Branimir, which is given for excellence in promoting Croatia's international relations. In addition, the Croatian Olympic Committee elected him several times as Croatia's coach of the year (2002, 2006, 2010, 2014).

== See also ==
- List of Croatian sportspeople
- Croatia at the Olympics
- Croatia at the 2002 Winter Olympics
- Croatia at the 2006 Winter Olympics
