= Janica Kostelić =

Croatian alpine skier (born 1982)

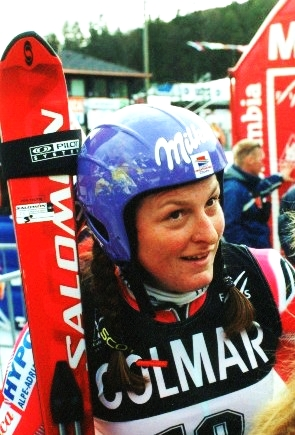
- Janica Kostelić in Maribor, January 2001

Personal information
- Born: 5 January 1982 (age 44) Zagreb, SR Croatia, SFR Yugoslavia
- Height: 1.75 m (5 ft 9 in)
- Website: janica.hr

Skiing career
- Sport: Alpine skiing
- Retired: April 2007 (age 25)
- Disciplines: Slalom, giant slalom, super-G, downhill, combined
- World Cup debut: 23 January 1998 (age 16)

Olympics
- Teams: 3 – (1998–2006)
- Medals: 6 (4 gold)

World Championships
- Teams: 4 – (1999–2005)
- Medals: 5 (5 gold)

World Cup
- Seasons: 8 – (1998–2003, 2005-2006)
- Wins: 30
- Podiums: 55
- Overall titles: 3 – (2001, 2003, 2006)
- Discipline titles: 7 – (3 SL, 4 K)
Medal record
Women's alpine skiing
Representing Croatia
World Cup race podiums
Event	1st	2nd	3rd
Slalom	20	9	6
Giant slalom	2	3	2
Downhill	1	2	1
Super-G	1	1	0
Combined	6	1	0
Total	30	16	9
International competitions
Event	1st	2nd	3rd
Olympic Games	4	2	0
World Championships	5	0	0
World Junior Championships	0	1	1
Total	9	3	1
Olympic Games
Gold medal – first place	2002 Salt Lake City	Slalom
Gold medal – first place	2002 Salt Lake City	Giant slalom
Gold medal – first place	2002 Salt Lake City	Combined
Gold medal – first place	2006 Turin	Combined
Silver medal – second place	2002 Salt Lake City	Super-G
Silver medal – second place	2006 Turin	Super-G
World Championships
Gold medal – first place	2003 St. Moritz	Slalom
Gold medal – first place	2003 St. Moritz	Combined
Gold medal – first place	2005 Bormio	Slalom
Gold medal – first place	2005 Bormio	Downhill
Gold medal – first place	2005 Bormio	Combined
Junior World Ski Championships
Silver medal – second place	1998 Megève	Combined
Bronze medal – third place	1998 Megève	Super-G

External videos
- Janica Kostelic - Most Successful Female Skier Ever

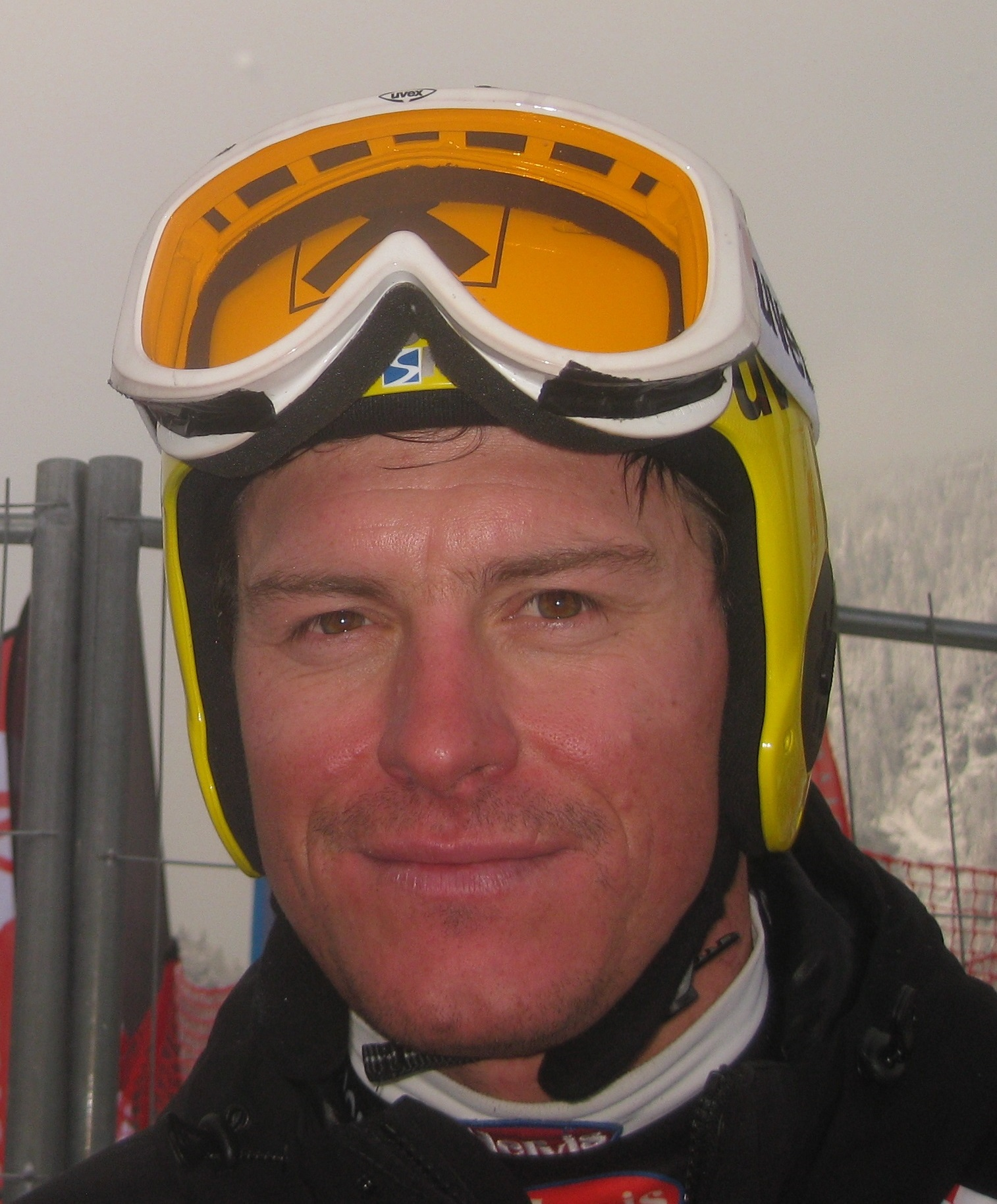
Ivica Kostelić, Janica’s brother

Janica Kostelić (pronounced [janitsa kostelitɕ]; born 5 January 1982) is a Croatian former alpine ski racer. She is a four-time Olympic gold medalist. In addition to the Olympics, she won five gold medals at the World Championships. In World Cup competition, she won thirty individual races, three overall titles, three slalom titles, and four combined titles. Kostelić's accomplishments in professional skiing have led some commentators, writers, and fellow ski racers to regard her as the greatest female ski racer of all time.

== Biography ==
Kostelić is the only woman to win four gold medals in alpine skiing at the Winter Olympics (in 2002 and 2006), and the only woman to win three alpine skiing gold medals in one Olympics (2002).

Kostelić was the World Cup overall champion in 2001, 2003 and 2006. On 15 January 2006, Kostelić became the third woman in World Cup history (after Swede Pernilla Wiberg and Austrian Petra Kronberger) to win World Cup races in all of the sport's five disciplines. On 5 February 2006 Kostelić became the second female skier (after Petra Kronberger) to win all five disciplines in one season.

In the summer of 2006, she decided to not compete in the 2007 season, due to chronic knee and back pain. She had endured ten knee surgeries and thyroid surgery during her career. Following a year away from competition, Kostelić announced her retirement from racing in April 2007, at just 25 years old.

Since 2016, Kostelić has been the State Secretary for Science, Education and Sports in the Croatian Government.

== Career ==
=== Early years ===
Kostelić was born in Zagreb, Croatia, then part of Yugoslavia, into a winter sports family. Her father Ante was also her trainer. Her older brother Ivica is a ski racer in his own right, the 2011 overall World Cup champion. She started skiing at the age of three and began training at nine years old, and quickly became successful and won several junior competitions.

At the age of 16, Kostelić was selected for the Croatian team for the 1998 Winter Olympics in Nagano. Her best result was 8th place in the combined. She competed in all five disciplines. She won her first World Cup slalom in December 1999. Kostelić then suffered knee ligament damage which kept her out of competition until late 2000. She won the World Cup overall title that 2001 season with eight further victories.

=== 2002 Winter Olympics ===
At the 2002 Winter Olympics she won three gold medals and a silver, the first Winter Olympic medals ever for an athlete from Croatia. No other female alpine racer has ever won four medals or three gold medals at a single Olympics.

Kostelić chose not to compete in the downhill and concentrated on the combined. She performed well in the downhill run and then won the gold medal after the two-run slalom. She then won a silver medal in the super-G, just behind Daniela Ceccarelli. The next race was the slalom, in which Kostelić won her second gold medal, narrowly beating Laure Péquegnot. Her final victory was in the giant slalom, a substantial 1.32 seconds ahead of silver medalist Anja Pärson.

=== Later career ===
Kostelić won the World Cup overall title again in 2003, but missed the following season due to knee surgery in October, her fourth in ten months, and thyroid surgery in January 2004. This caused 2004 to be the only year from 1998 to 2006 that she was not recognized as "Croatian Sportswoman of the Year."

After more than 18 months aways from competition, she returned to World Cup competition at Sölden and finished eighth in the giant slalom in October 2004. At the World Championships in February 2005, she won three gold medals, despite being in ill health. She won the downhill and successfully defended her world titles in slalom and combined.

In the 2006 season, Kostelić won the World Cup overall title for the third time, but also was in Top 5 in all 4 disciplines, including number 1 in slalom. She won her first World Cup races in giant slalom (2), super-G and downhill in 2006.

At the 2006 Winter Olympics in Torino she won a gold medal in women's alpine combined. That was her fourth Olympic gold medal, making her the most successful female skier in the history of the Olympic Games. This record was set on 18 February 2006, only half an hour after Norway's Kjetil André Aamodt, winner of the men's super-G, became the first Alpine skier in men's competition to win four Olympic gold medals.

She also became the first alpine skier to win the "Sportswoman of the Year" award at the Laureus World Sports Awards in 2006, in part for her accomplishment of winning races in each discipline during the year.

Due to recurring injuries, Kostelić has not competed since the conclusion of the 2006 season. As expected, she announced her retirement a year later on 19 April 2007, citing persistent pain from her injuries.

=== World Cup ===
She won 3 overall World Cup titles: 2001, 2003 and 2006. In 2005 she was second overall, just three points behind winner Anja Pärson – the smallest difference between 1st and 2nd place in women's World Cup history. (In 2011, Maria Riesch beat Lindsey Vonn in the overall world cup by a margin of three points as well.)

Kostelić also won the slalom season title three times, the same years that she won the overall titles. She also would have won the season trophy for the combined discipline four times (2001, 2003, 2005, 2006), but the discipline trophy for the combined was not awarded to women during her career, being added only in 2007.

She won a total of 30 World Cup races, including at least one in every discipline: 20 in slalom, 6 in combined, 2 in giant slalom, 1 in super-G, and 1 in downhill.

== World Cup results ==
=== Season titles ===
- 6 titles – (3 overall, 3 slalom) plus 4 combined (unofficial)

Season	Discipline
2001	Overall
2001	Slalom
2001	Combined
2003	Overall
2003	Slalom
2003	Combined
2005	Combined
2006	Overall
2006	Slalom
2006	Combined

=== Season standings ===
Season	Age	Overall	Slalom	Giant slalom	Super-G	Downhill	Combined
1999	17	11	11	10	26	49	2
2000	18	22	10	28	28	39	–
2001	19	1	1	9	18	50	1
2002	20	14	11	25	19	41	4
2003	21	1	1	3	7	11	1
2004	22	injured, out for season					
2005	23	2	2	11	7	4	1
2006	24	1	1	3	5	4	1

=== Race victories ===
- 30 wins – (1 DH, 1 SG, 2 GS, 20 SL, 6 K)

Season	Date	Location	Discipline
1999	17 Jan 1999	St. Anton, Austria	Combined
2000	5 Dec 1999	Serre-Chevalier, France	Slalom
2000	12 Dec 1999	Sestriere, Italy	Slalom
2001	18 Nov 2000	Park City, US	Slalom
2001	26 Nov 2000	Aspen, USA	Slalom
2001	10 Dec 2000	Sestriere, Italy	Slalom
2001	20 Dec 2000	Sestriere, Italy	Slalom
2001	29 Dec 2000	Semmering, Austria	Slalom
2001	14 Jan 2001	Flachau, Austria	Slalom
2001	14 Jan 2001	Flachau, Austria	Combined
2001	26 Jan 2001	Ofterschwang, Germany	Slalom
2001	18 Feb 2001	Garmisch, Germany	Slalom
2002	10 Mar 2002	Altenmarkt, Austria	Slalom
2003	23 Nov 2002	Park City, USA	Slalom
2003	22 Dec 2002	Lenzerheide, Switzerland	Slalom
2003	22 Dec 2002	Lenzerheide, Switzerland	Combined
2003	29 Dec 2002	Semmering, Austria	Slalom
2003	5 Jan 2003	Bormio, Italy	Slalom
2003	13 Mar 2003	Åre, Sweden	Slalom
2005	27 Nov 2004	Aspen, USA	Slalom
2005	27 Feb 2005	San Sicario, Italy	Combined
2006	21 Dec 2005	Špindlerův Mlýn, Czech Rep.	Giant slalom
2006	14 Jan 2006	Bad Kleinkirchheim, Austria	Downhill
2006	15 Jan 2006	Bad Kleinkirchheim, Austria	Super-G
2006	22 Jan 2006	St. Moritz, Switzerland	Combined
2006	5 Feb 2006	Ofterschwang, Austria	Slalom
2006	4 Mar 2006	Hafjell, Norway	Combined
2006	10 Mar 2006	Levi, Finland	Slalom
2006	17 Mar 2006	Åre, Sweden	Slalom
2006	18 Mar 2006	Åre, Sweden	Giant slalom

== World Championship results ==
Year	Age	Slalom	Giant slalom	Super-G	Downhill	Combined
1999	17	23	DNF1	22	29	7
2001	19	5	DNS1	13	–	—
2003	21	1	13	19	–	1
2005	23	1	DNS1	–	1	1

== Olympic results ==
Year	Age	Slalom	Giant slalom	Super-G	Downhill	Combined
1998	16	DNF1	24	26	25	8
2002	20	1	1	2	—	1
2006	24	4	DNS1	2	DNS	1

== Personal life ==
On 1 January 2019, Kostelić gave birth to her first child.

== See also ==
- List of multiple Olympic gold medalists
- List of multiple Olympic gold medalists at a single Games
- Ante Kostelić
- List of FIS Alpine Ski World Cup women's race winners
- Croatian national alpine ski team

Winter Olympics
Preceded by Vedran Pavlek	Flagbearer for Croatia; Nagano 1998; Salt Lake City 2002; Turin 2006	Succeeded by Jakov Fak
