= Ido Cattaneo =

Italian alpine skier (1905–2000)

Personal information
- Born: Ilario; 25 July 1905 Laino, Italy
- Died: 7 June 2000 (aged 94) St. Moritz, Italy

Skiing career
- Sport: Alpine skiing
- Disciplines: Downhill
Medal record
World Championships
Bronze medal – third place	1934 St. Moritz	Downhill

Ilario "Ido" Cattaneo (25 July 1905 – 7 June 2000) was an Italian alpine skier bronze medal at FIS Alpine World Ski Championships 1934 (downhill).

== See also ==
- Italy national alpine ski team
