= Franz Pfnür =

German alpine skier (1908–1996)

Medal record

Representing Germany

Men's Alpine skiing

Winter Olympics
Gold medal – first place	1936 Garmisch-Partenkirchen	Combined

World Championship
Gold medal – first place	1934 St. Moritz	Slalom
Silver medal – second place	1934 St. Moritz	Downhill
Silver medal – second place	1934 St. Moritz	Combined

Franz Pfnür (21 November 1908 – 21 September 1996) was a German alpine skier who competed in the 1936 Winter Olympics.

He was born in Schellenberg.

In 1936, he won the gold medal in the alpine skiing combined event.

As a recognition of his achievements, Pfnür was later invited to coffee with Adolf Hitler at his mountain retreat in Obersalzberg. He also joined the Schutzstaffel (SS).
