= Edoardo Zardini (alpine skier) =

Italian alpine skier

Personal information
- Born: 19 November 1976 (age 49) Cortina d’Ampezzo, Italy

Skiing career
- Sport: Alpine skiing
- Retired: 2008
- Disciplines: Technical events
- World Cup debut: 2000

Olympics
- Teams: 1

World Cup
- Seasons: 9
- Podiums: 1
Medal record
Men's alpine skiing
Representing Italy
World Cup race podiums
Event	1st	2nd	3rd
Slalom	0	0	1

Edoardo Zardini (born 19 November 1976) is an Italian former alpine skier.

== Career ==
During his career he has achieved 4 results among the top 10 (1 podium) in the World Cup. He competed in the 2002 Winter Olympics.

== World Cup results ==
Top 3

Date	Place	Discipline	Rank
13-01-2002	(Switzerland) Wengen	Slalom	3
