= FIS Alpine World Ski Championships 1934 =

Skiing event in St. Moritz, Switzerland

- Host city: Saint Moritz
- Country: Switzerland
- Events: 6
- Opening: 15 February 1934
- Closing: 17 February 1934
- Opened by: Marcel Pilet-Golaz

Location in the Alps of Europe
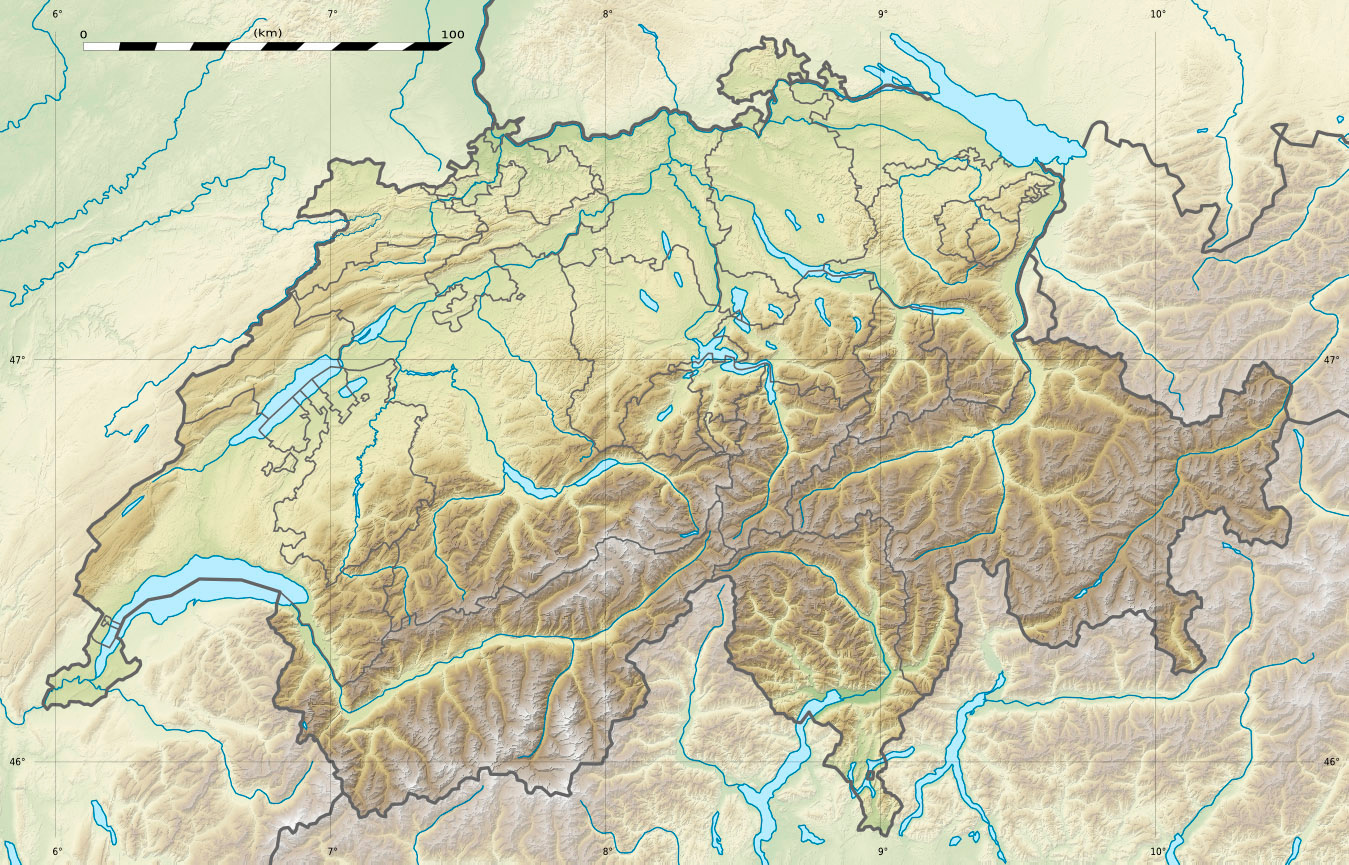
Location in Switzerland

The FIS Alpine World Ski Championships 1934 in alpine skiing were the fourth edition of the competition, organized by the International Ski Federation (FIS) and held at Piz Nair in St. Moritz, Switzerland in February 1934.

== Medal summary ==
=== Men's events ===
Event	Gold	Silver	Bronze
Downhill	David Zogg (SUI)	Franz Pfnür (GER)	Ido Cattaneo (ITA); Heinz von Allmen (SUI)
Slalom	Franz Pfnür (GER)	David Zogg (SUI)	Willi Steuri (SUI)
Combined	David Zogg (SUI)	Franz Pfnür (GER)	Heinz Von Allmen (SUI)

=== Women's events ===
Event	Gold	Silver	Bronze
Downhill	Anny Rüegg (SUI)	Christl Cranz (GER)	Lisa Resch (GER)
Slalom	Christl Cranz (GER)	Lisa Resch (GER)	Rösli Rominger (SUI)
Combined	Christl Cranz (GER)	Lisa Resch (GER)	Anny Rüegg (SUI)

== Medal table ==
* Host nation (Switzerland)

Rank	Nation	Gold	Silver	Bronze	Total
1	Germany (GER)	3	5	1	9
2	Switzerland (SUI)*	3	1	5	9
3	Italy (ITA)	0	0	1	1
Totals (3 entries)		6	6	7	19
