= Elias Kolega =

Croatian alpine skier (born 1996)

Personal information
- Born: 23 May 1996 (age 30) Munich, Bavaria, Germany
- Family: Samuel Kolega (brother)

Skiing career
- Country: Croatia
- Sport: Alpine skiing
- Club: SK Jaska
- Retired: April 2022 (age 25)
- Disciplines: Slalom
- World Cup debut: 6 January 2015 (age 18)

Olympics
- Teams: 1 – (2018)

World Championships
- Teams: 3 – (2013–17)

World Cup
- Seasons: 3 – (2018–20)
- Overall titles: 0 – (73rd in 2019)
- Discipline titles: 0 – (25th in SL, 2019)

Elias Kolega (Croatian pronunciation: [kolěːɡa]; born 23 May 1996) is a retired Croatian alpine ski racer, who competed primarily in slalom events.

He competed at the 2015 World Championships in Beaver Creek, US, in the giant slalom.

He is the brother of fellow alpine skier Samuel Kolega. In April 2017 it was announced that the brothers would be coached by Ante Kostelić.

In February 2020, he suffered an open leg fracture, went through surgery and rehabilitation only to be injured again in October of the same year. Due to his struggle with injuries, he stopped skiing in 2020, and in April 2022 retired from professional skiing.

== World Cup results ==
=== Season standings ===
Season
Season	Age	Overall	Slalom	Giant slalom	Super-G	Downhill	Combined	Parallel
2018	21	141	49	—	—	—	—	—N/a
2019	22	73	25	—	—	—	—	—N/a
2020	23	117	42	—	—	—	—	—

=== Top-ten results ===
- 0 podiums, 1 top ten

Season
Season	Date	Location	Discipline	Place
2019	13 January 2019	Adelboden, Switzerland	Slalom	6th

== World Championship results ==
Year
Year	Age	Slalom	Giant slalom	Super-G	Downhill	Combined	Team event
2013	16	—	69	—	—	—	—
2015	18	—	42	—	—	—	—
2017	20	60	DNFQ2	—	—	—	9
2019	22	21	37	—	—	—	—

== Olympic results ==
Year
Year	Age	Slalom	Giant slalom	Super-G	Downhill	Combined
2018	21	23	—	—	—	—
