= Stina Hofgård Nilsen =

Norwegian alpine skier

Personal information
- Born: 24 September 1979 (age 46) Bergen, Norway

Skiing career
- Sport: Alpine skiing
- Retired: 2004
- Disciplines: Technical events
- World Cup debut: 1998

Olympics
- Teams: 1

World Championships
- Teams: 2

World Cup
- Seasons: 7
- Wins: 1
- Podiums: 3
Medal record
Women's alpine skiing
Representing Norway
World Cup race podiums
Event	1st	2nd	3rd
Giant slalom	1	1	1

Stina Hofgård Nilsen (born 24 September 1979) is a Norwegian former alpine skier.

== Career ==
During her career she has achieved 3 results among the top 3 (1 victory) in the World Cup. She competed at the Winter Olympics in Salt Lake City in 2002.

== World Cup results ==
Top 3

Date	Place	Discipline	Rank
27-01-2002	(Italy) Cortina d'Ampezzo	Giant slalom	1
19-01-2002	(Germany) Berchtesgaden	Giant slalom	2
04-01-2002	(Slovenia) Maribor	Giant slalom	3
