= Alessandra Merlin =

Italian alpine skier (born 1975)

Alessandra Merlin (born 22 September 1975) is a retired Italian alpine skier who competed in the 1998 Winter Olympics.
