= Hochwurzen =

Mountain in Austria

Coordinates: 47°20′50″N 13°41′09″E

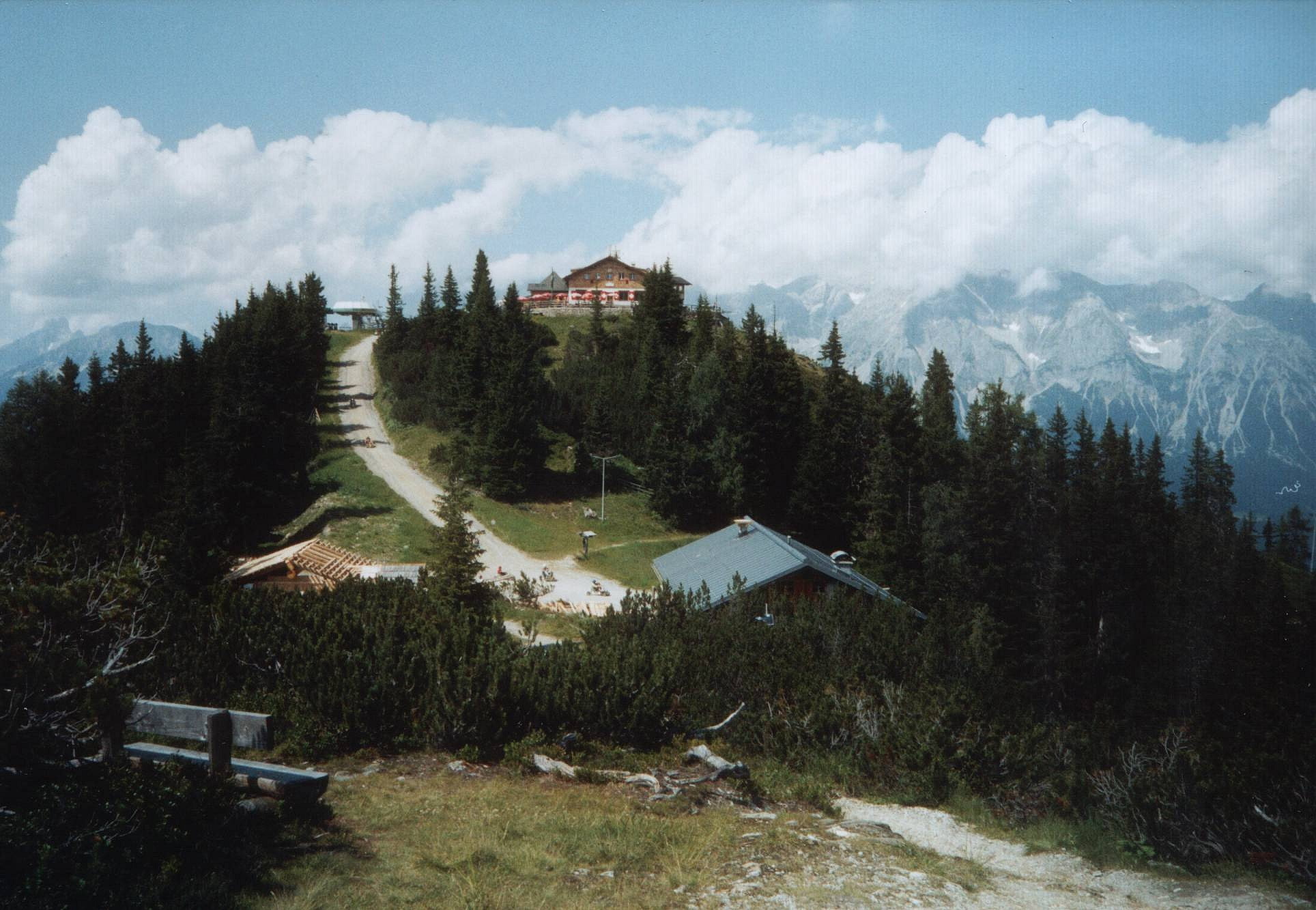
- Interactive map of Hochwurzen
- Location: Austria
- Top elevation: 0 meters (0 ft)
- Base elevation: 0 meters (0 ft)
- Skiable area: 167 Piste Kilometers
- Lift system: 0 total (0 Cable Car, 0 Double Seat chairlift, 0 Tow Lifts)
- Website: https://www.planai.at/winter/index.php

Hochwurzen is a ski area located in Austria. It is part of the Schladminger 4-Berge-Schaukel, which are four interconnected mountains.
