= Maria Holaus =

Austrian alpine skier (born 1983)

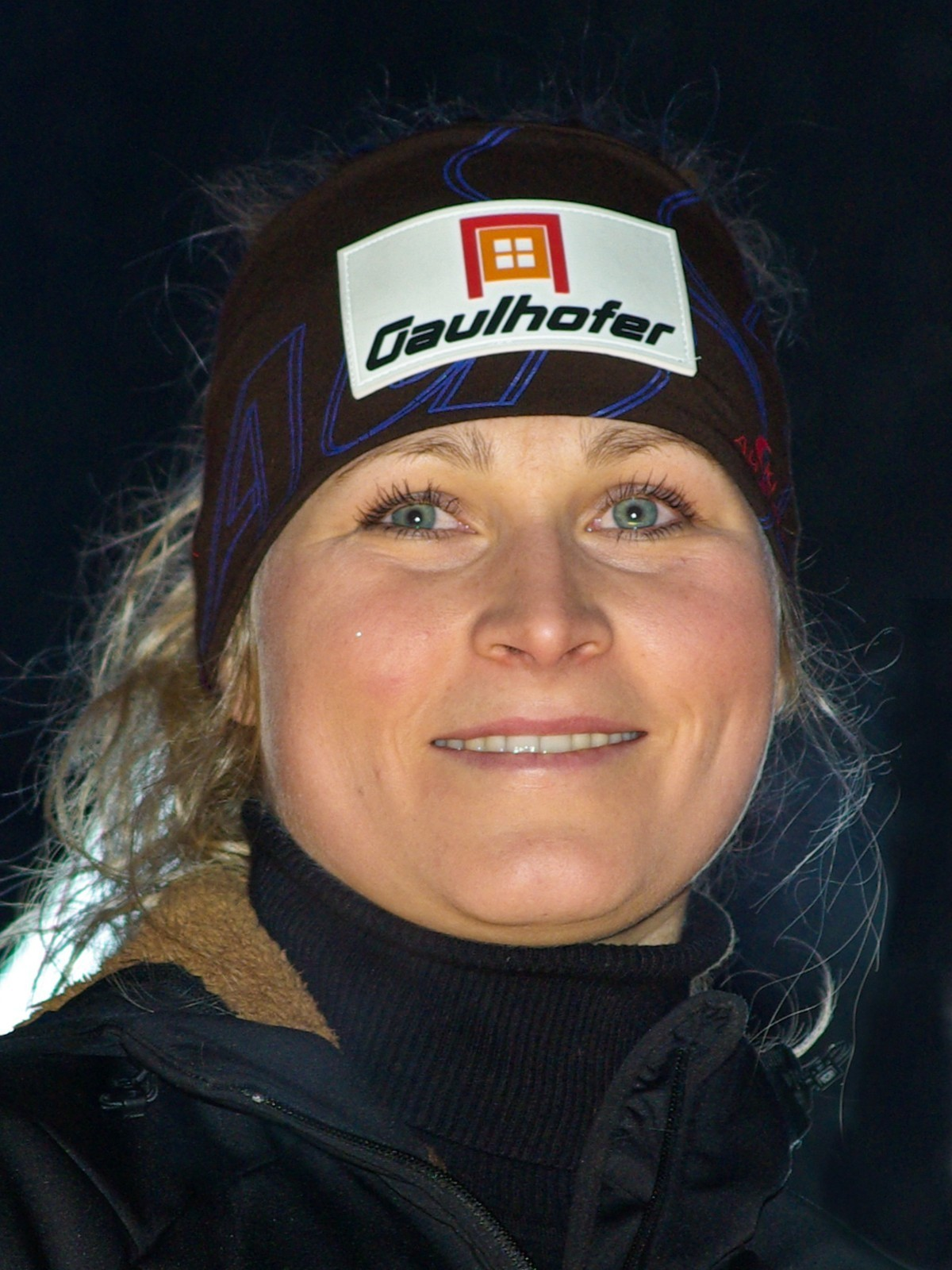
Maria Holaus (Altenmarkt-Zauchensee 2009)

Maria Holaus (born 19 December 1983) is a professional alpine skier from Austria. Her specialities are the Downhill and the Super-G.

== Career highlights ==
FIS World Ski Championships
2001 - Verbier, (silver) 2nd at downhill (juniors)
2007 - Are, 21st at downhill
World Cup
2007 - San Sicario/Sestriere, (bronze) 3rd at downhill
2008 - Cortina d'Ampezzo, (gold) 1st at super-g
2008 - St. Moritz, (silver) 2nd at downhill.
European Cup
2002 - Altenmarkt-Zauchensee (1), (gold) 1st at downhill
2002 - Altenmarkt-Zauchensee (2), (gold) 1st at downhill
2006 - Altenmarkt-Zauchensee, (gold) 1st at downhill
2006 - Altenmarkt-Zauchensee, (silver) 2nd at super-g
2006 - Hemsedal (1), (silver) 2nd at super-g
2006 - Hemsedal (2), (gold) 1st at super-g
2007 - St. Moritz, (silver) 2nd at super-g
National Championships
2006 - Altenmarkt-Zauchensee, (gold) 1st at downhill
