= Haus im Ennstal =

- Municipality
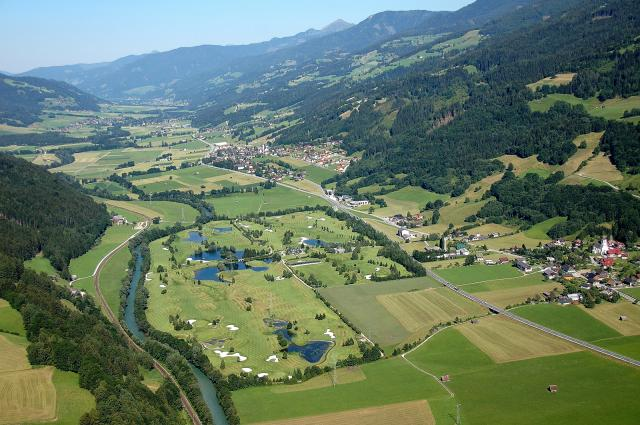
- Haus im Ennstal

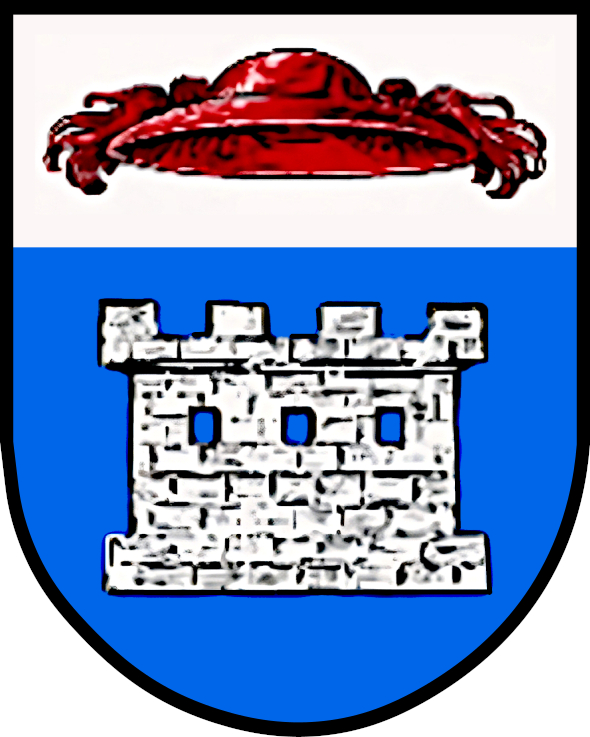
- Coat of arms

- Location within Austria
- Coordinates: 47°24′27″N 13°46′01″E
- Country: Austria
- State: Styria
- District: Liezen

Government
  - Mayor: Gerhard Schütter (ÖVP)

Area
  - Total: 83 km^{2} (32 sq mi)
- Elevation: 774 m (2,539 ft)

Population (2018-01-01)
  - Total: 2,429
  - Density: 29/km^{2} (76/sq mi)
- Time zone: UTC+1 (CET)
  - Summer (DST): UTC+2 (CEST)
- Postal code: 8967
- Area code: 03686
- Vehicle registration: GB
- Website: haus.at

Haus im Ennstal is a village in central Austria, located in the Liezen district of Styria. It is an important town on the Enns river and is at the foot of Hauser Kaibling.

Haus is a well-known ski resort and has hosted World Cup alpine races several times, and the women's events of the World Championships in 1982. It offers a skiable field of 115 km (71 mi) served by 52 ski lifts.

== Notable people ==
Helmut Höflehner is a two-time downhill skiing World Cup Winner who was born in Gumpenberg, Haus im Ennstal in 1959.
