= Laure Pequegnot =

French alpine skier (born 1975)

Medal record

Women's alpine skiing

Representing France

Olympic Games
Silver medal – second place	2002 Salt Lake City	Slalom

World Championships
Bronze medal – third place	2005 Bormio	Team event

Laure Pequegnot (born 30 September 1975) is a French former Alpine skier.

She was born in Échirolles, Isère. She won a total of 3 Alpine skiing World Cup races, all in the slalom discipline. She became world junior champion in slalom, in 1994. She won World Cup discipline title, in slalom, in 2002. She competed at three Winter Olympics, winning a silver medal in the Slalom event at the 2002 Salt Lake City Olympics.

== World Cup victories ==
Date	Location	Race
22 November 2001	(United States) Copper Mountain	Slalom
13 January 2002	(Austria) Saalbach	Slalom
3 February 2002	(Sweden) Åre	Slalom
