= Reiteralm (Styria) =

Coordinates: 47°21′34″N 13°35′42″E

- Interactive map of Reiteralm
- Location: Austria
- Top elevation: 1,860 meters (6,100 ft)
- Base elevation: 780 meters (2,560 ft)
- Skiable area: 167 Piste Kilometers
- Lift system: 20 total (2 gondola lifts, 5 chairlifts, 13 tow lifts)
- Website: http://www.ski-reiteralm.at/de/winter

Reiteralm is part of the Schladminger 4-Berge-Schaukel, a network of four mountains. It is located in Austria.
