= David Chodounsky =

American alpine skier

Personal information
- Born: June 25, 1984 (age 42) Saint Paul, Minnesota
- Height: 5 ft 11 in (180 cm)
- Website: davidchodounsky.com

Skiing career
- Sport: Alpine skiing ♂
- Club: Crested Butte Mountain; Sports Team
- Retired: July 3, 2018 (age 34)
- Disciplines: Giant slalom, slalom
- World Cup debut: December 21, 2009 (age 25)

Olympics
- Teams: 2 – (2014, 2018)
- Medals: 0

World Championships
- Teams: 4 – (2011–2017)
- Medals: 0

World Cup
- Seasons: 5 – (2013–18)
- Podiums: 0
- Overall titles: 0 – (49th in 2016)
- Discipline titles: 0 – (15th in SL, 2016)

David Chodounsky (born June 25, 1984) is a former World Cup alpine ski racer from the United States, and specialized in the technical disciplines of slalom and giant slalom. Chodounsky competed in two Winter Olympics (2014, 2018); prior to the U.S. Ski Team, he raced for Dartmouth College in New Hampshire.

== Background ==
David Chodounsky was born on June 25, 1984, in Saint Paul, Minnesota to Anna and Martin Chodounsky, Czech parents originally from Prague. He was raised in Minnesota and began skiing at the age of two on a pair of "whittled wooden planks" in his family's front yard. Chodounsky began ski racing at the age of seven, and joined a local ski racing team at Buck Hill in Burnsville, Minnesota. While participating in the team, he was coached alongside Lindsey Vonn by Erich Sailer. To further his skiing career, Chodounsky and his family relocated in 1995 to Crested Butte, Colorado, when he was eleven years old, and attended Crested Butte Academy.

== College ski career ==
Following his graduation from Crested Butte Academy in 2003, Chodounsky was unable to qualify for the United States Ski Team. he was accepted to Dartmouth College in Hanover, New Hampshire, but deferred for a year to train in Europe. Chodounsky began attending Dartmouth in fall 2004, where he participated in the college's ski team. During his freshman year at Dartmouth in 2005, Chodounsky won the slalom title at the NCAA Skiing Championships. Two years later, during his sophomore year at Dartmouth, Chodounsky was the captain of the school's ski program. He graduated from Dartmouth College in 2008 with a Bachelor of Arts degree with a double major in engineering and geology.

== Racing career ==
Following his graduation from Dartmouth, Chodounsky won the United States national slalom title in 2009. Upon winning this title, Chodounsky was selected to join the United States Ski Team. Chodounsky was the only member of the team to earn his college degree prior to making the team. In 2010, Chodounsky won the slalom at the Nor-Am Cup and Australian New Zealand Cup. Chodounsky cut his 2012 season short after he underwent surgery on his patella. During the 2013 Alpine Skiing World Cup, Chodounsky placed 15th place in the France slalom at Val-d'Isère, and 10th place in the Switzerland slalom at Adelboden. In August 2013, Chodounsky won the slaloms at both the Australian New Zealand Cup and the Australian National Championship. He finished the 2013 season ranked 21st overall in slalom.

On January 26, 2014, Chodounsky was nominated by the United States Ski and Snowboard Association to compete with the U.S. Olympic Alpine Ski Team at the 2014 Winter Olympics in Sochi, Russia. The 2014 Winter Olympics are Chodounsky's first Olympic Games. However, he failed to finish in his only event at the Games, the slalom. He was selected again for the 2018 Winter Olympics in Pyongchang, South Korea, where he finished 18th in the slalom and was part of the US squad that competed in the inaugural Olympic team event, being knocked out in the first round by Great Britain.

In July 2018, Chodounsky announced his retirement from competition via an Instagram post.

== World Cup results ==
=== Season standings ===
Season	Age	Overall	Slalom	Giant slalom	Super-G	Downhill	Combined
2011	26	112	43	—	—	—	—
2012	27						
2013	28	63	21	—	—	—	—
2014	29	62	19	—	—	—	—
2015	30	70	25	39	—	—	—
2016	31	49	15	40	—	—	—
2017	32	73	31	—	—	—	—
2018	33	104	34	—	—	—	—

=== Race results ===
Chodounsky did not reach a World Cup podium, but had seven finishes in the top ten; his best result is fourth place in a slalom in December 2015.

== World Championship results ==
Year	Age	Slalom	Giant slalom	Super-G	Downhill	Combined
2011	26	DNF2	—	—	—	—
2013	28	DNF1	—	—	—	—
2015	30	DNF1	29	—	—	—
2017	32	12	11	—	—	—

== Olympic results ==
Year	Age	Slalom	Giant slalom	Super-G	Downhill	Combined	Team event
2014	29	DNF1	—	—	—	—	not run
2018	33	18	—	—	—	—	9
