= 2025 Alpine Skiing World Cup – Women's super-G =

Alpine ski discipline year standings

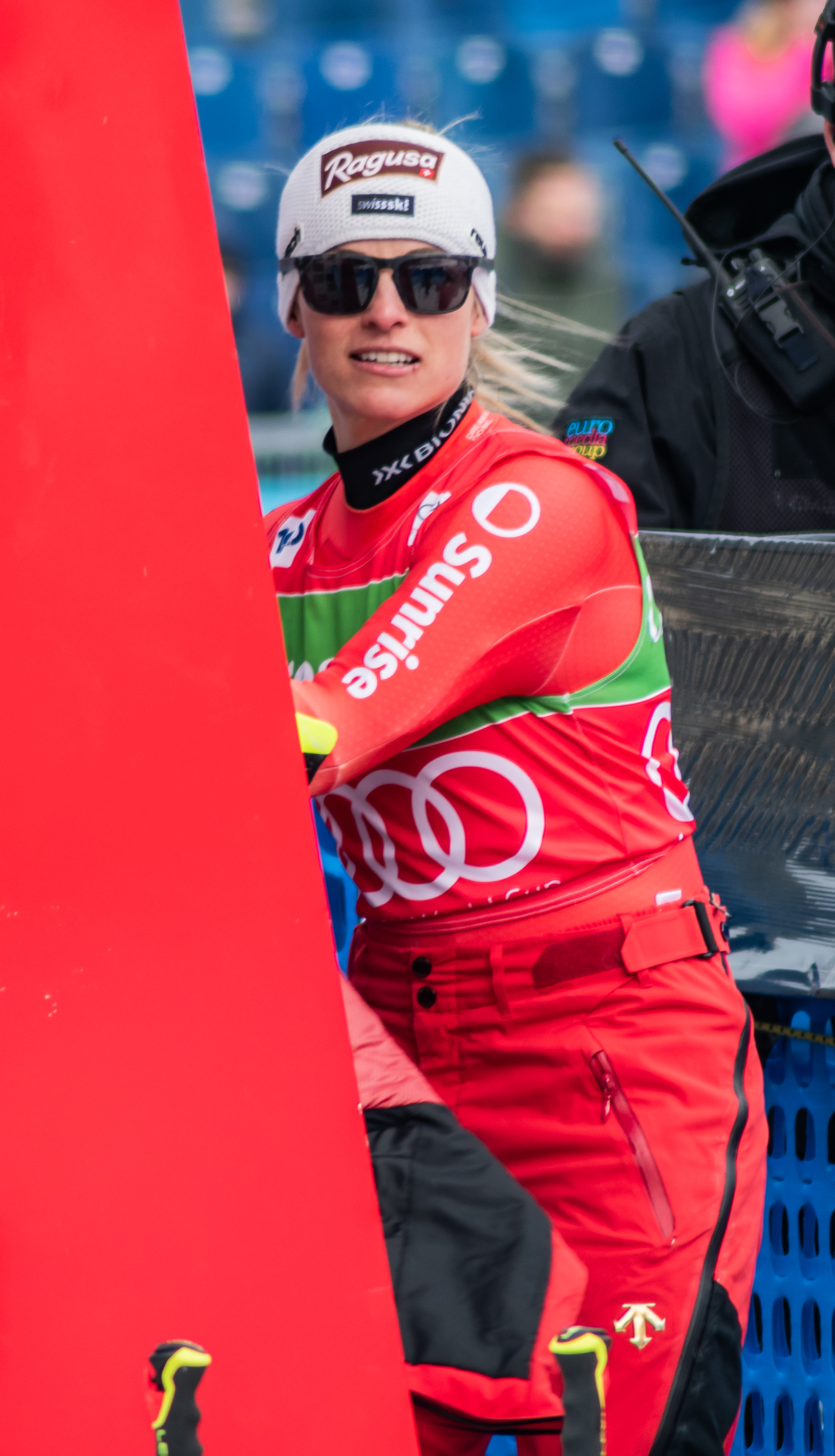
2025 Women's Super-G World Cup: Lara Gut-Behrami of Switzerland, discipline champion for the sixth time and third straight season; 2025 Women's World Cup; Overall • Downhill • Super-G; Giant slalom • Slalom
Previous: 2024	Next: 2026

The women's super-G in the 2025 FIS Alpine Skiing World Cup consisted of nine events, including the final. A ninth race planned for St. Moritz, Switzerland was cancelled and not rescheduled until 1 March, when it was added as a second super-G at La Thuile on Thursday, 13 March. The discipline did not open for the season until 15 December, 2024 in Beaver Creek, Colorado, United States. Lara Gut-Behrami of Switzerland, a five-time champion in the discipline, overwhelmingly won the final to capture her record sixth championship in the discipline (and third straight).

The season was interrupted for the Alpine Skiing World Championships, this time in Saalbach, Austria during 4–16 February 2025. The championship in women's super-G was held on Thursday, 6 February and was won by the home nation's Stephanie Venier, who was ninth at the time in the season standings.

== Season summary ==
The inaugural race of the season, run on the Birds of Prey course in Beaver Creek, Colorado, was won by Italy's Sofia Goggia in her returning weekend from a career-threatening knee injury suffered in February; defending discipline champion Lara Gut-Behrami from Switzerland finished second. Back in Europe, in the first of two races at St. Moritz, four of the top five from the United States race were still in the top five, and one of them—Connie Hütter of Austria—pulled out the victory in front of the Swiss crowd, leaving Goggia and Gut-Behrami in a tie for the season lead with Hütter just ten points behind. The second super-G was canceled due to strong winds and poor visibility. In January, the next super-G was held in St. Anton, Austria, and while the buzz before the race was dominated by discussions about the return (at 40, after being retired for six years, and with a titanium knee joint) of five-time discipline champion Lindsey Vonn of the United States, who had placed 13th in her super-G return at St. Moritz and then placed 6th in her first downhill the day before, the story after the race was Vonn's 22-year-old American teammate Lauren Macuga, who had worn a ski helmet with a "?" on it where a sponsor's name would normally be (because she didn't have one), but who achieved her first World Cup podium with her first World Cup win (with Vonn fourth). After the race, Brignone, who finished third, led the overall World Cup standings, and Gut-Behrami, who finished fifth, led the discipline standings. Brignone won the next super-G on home turf at Cortina to close the discipline deficit, but on German soil at Garmisch, Gut-Behrami won the super-G and earned her 46th career World Cup victory, placing her fifth all-time among women, behind only two Americans (Mikaela Shiffrin and Vonn), an Austrian (Annemarie Moser-Pröll), and another Swiss woman (Vreni Schneider).

In the World Championships at Saalbach, Austria, home favorite Stephanie Venier, who last medaled in the Worlds in 2017, pulled a huge upset to claim the gold over Brignone (second), with third tied between Norway's Kajsa Vickhoff Lie and the U.S.'s Macuga. In the first super-G after worlds at Kvitfjell, Norway, Brignone nipped Gut-Behrami by .06 seconds for the win, which closed the gap between them to 55 points. Two weeks later at La Thuile, Italy, in the race rescheduled from St. Moritz, 21-year-old German Emma Aicher, who had recorded her first World Cup podium and first World Cup win in the two downhills at Kvitfjell two weeks earlier, recorded her first World Cup podium and win in super-G, with Brignone third and Gut-Behrami fourth, closing the gap by 10 more points to 45. The next day, though, Aicher skied out while again leading, and Brignone won again (for her season-best third victory in the discipline) with Gut-Behrami again fourth, moving Brignone into a 5-point lead in the discipline with everyone else eliminated and just the finals remaining.

== Finals ==
The World Cup finals in the discipline took place on Sunday, 23 March 2025 in Sun Valley, Idaho, United States. Only the top 25 skiers in the World Cup slalom discipline and the winner of the Junior World Championship in the discipline (Jasmin Mathis of Switzerland), plus any skiers who have scored at least 500 points in the World Cup overall classification for the season, were eligible to compete in the final, and only the top 15 earned World Cup points. No one with 500+ points and not otherwise eligible elected to start, and four eligible competitors (Stephanie Venier and Ricarda Haaser of Austria, both injured, and Ester Ledecká of Czechia and Mathis, both with scheduling conflicts) opted not to enter, leaving the starting field at 22. And Gut-Behrami blew away the field, winning the race by over a second to win the season championship for a record sixth time (2014, 2016, 2021, 2023-25; breaking Lindsey Vonn's record of five (2009-12, 2015)), with 40-year-old Vonn (capturing her first World Cup podium in over seven years, since 15 March 2018) in second and Brignone in third.

== Standings ==
	Venue	15 Dec 2024; Beaver Creek	21 Dec 2024; St. Moritz	22 Dec 2024; St. Moritz	12 Jan 2025; St Anton	19 Jan 2025; Cortina d'Ampezzo	26 Jan 2025; Garmisch	6 Feb 2025; Saalbach WC	2 Mar 2025; Kvitfjell	13 Mar 2025; La Thuile R#	14 Mar 2025; La Thuile	23 Mar 2025; Sun Valley	
#	Skier	(United States)	(Switzerland)	(Switzerland)	(Austria)	(Italy)	(Germany)	(Austria)	(Norway)	(Italy)	(Italy)	(United States)	Total
	(Switzerland) Lara Gut-Behrami	80	80	x	45	80	100	⑧	80	50	50	100	665
2	(Italy) Federica Brignone	45	45	x	60	100	60	②	100	60	100	60	630
3	(Italy) Sofia Goggia	100	60	x	DNF	36	50	⑤	60	80	80	0	466
4	(Norway) Kajsa Vickhoff Lie	36	15	x	36	40	80	③	45	11	32	22	317
5	(Italy) Elena Curtoni	29	50	x	20	50	24	⑨	29	22	40	20	284
6	(United States) Lauren Macuga	22	36	x	100	20	22	③	22	45	12	DNF	279
7	(Austria) Cornelia Hütter	50	100	x	8	29	DNF	⑩	8	DNF	16	40	251
8	(Switzerland) Corinne Suter	12	26	x	32	60	18	⑭	16	18	50	16	248
9	(France) Romane Miradoli	32	DNF	x	10	12	26	⑮	36	20	60	45	241
10	(Austria) Ariane Rädler	60	7	x	18	32	DNF	㉑	12	32	36	36	233
11	(Italy) Marta Bassino	40	24	x	DNS	DNF	40	⑯	DNF	40	24	50	218
12	(Austria) Stephanie Venier	20	12	x	80	DNF	29	①	32	26	13	DNS	212
13	(United States) Lindsey Vonn	DNS	18	x	50	DNF	20	DNF	15	DNF	20	80	203
14	(Italy) Laura Pirovano	13	40	x	16	22	45	⑱	14	14	5	26	195
15	(Germany) Emma Aicher	3	15	x	14	26	7	⑥	DNF	100	DNF	29	194
16	(Czech Republic) Ester Ledecká	15	36	x	22	24	DNS	⑦	40	36	18	DNS	191
17	(New Zealand) Alice Robinson	5	22	x	24	15	15	⑪	50	13	DNF	32	176
18	(Germany) Kira Weidle-Winkelmann	DNF	9	x	40	DNF	32	㉓	26	DNF	3	24	134
19	(Austria) Mirjam Puchner	16	29	x	DNF	13	DNF	DNS	20	15	11	0	104
20	(Austria) Ricarda Haaser	DNF	12	x	29	45	16	DNF	DNS				102
	(Italy) Roberta Melesi	24	20	x	DNF	18	0	DNS	6	6	10	18	102
22	(Switzerland) Michelle Gisin	29	16	x	4	9	DNF	⑰	0	29	9	0	96
23	(Switzerland) Joana Hählen	9	0	x	11	5	DNF	DNS	5	16	26	0	72
	(Slovenia) Ilka Štuhec	11	13	x	13	11	5	㉒	9	3	7	DNF	72
25	(Switzerland) Malorie Blanc	DNS	DNF	x	29	10	DNS	⑫	18	7	6	DNF	70
26	(France) Laura Gauché	4	DNF	x	9	DNS	10	⑬	10	12	24	NE	69
27	(Austria) Christina Ager	18	3	x	0	5	1	DNS	14	24	DNF	NE	65
28	(United States) Keely Cashman	10	1	x	3	8	40	㉔	0	0	0	NE	62
29	(France) Karen Clément	14	0	x	15	14	DNF	㉖	DNF	DNF	14	NE	57
30	(Canada) Valérie Grenier	DNS	DNF	x	DNF	16	DNS	DNF	DNF	8	32	NE	56
31	(Austria) Nadine Fest	DNS		x	2	0	9	DNS	24	10	0	NE	45
32	(France) Camille Cerutti	0	8	x	2	0	3	㉕	0	9	15	NE	37
33	(United States) Breezy Johnson	3	0	x	DNF	6	11	⑲	DNF	4	0	NE	24
34	(Bosnia and Herzegovina) Elvedina Muzaferija	DNF	0	x	5	2	9	㉗	7	0	0	NE	23
35	(Italy) Asja Zenere	DNS	5	x	DNS		6	DNS	11	DNF	0	NE	22
36	(Switzerland) Jasmina Suter	6	0	x	12	3	DNS					NE	21
37	(Austria) Magdalena Egger	8	0	x	DNF	0	4	DNS	0	0	8	NE	20
38	(Switzerland) Janine Schmitt	DNS	4	x	DNF	DNF	14	DNS	1	0	DNF	NE	19
39	(Italy) Nicol Delago	DNF	0	x	DNF	0	13	DNS	3	0	DNF	NE	16
40	(United States) Tricia Mangan	0	6	x	0	7	0	DNS	0	DNF	0	NE	13
41	(Norway) Marte Monsen	0	DNF	x	0	0	12	DNF	0	0	0	NE	12
	(United States) Jacqueline Wiles	0	0	x	7	0	0	DNS	4	0	1	NE	12
43	(Switzerland) Delia Durrer	0	10	x	0	DNF	0	DNS	DNF	DNS		NE	10
44	(Switzerland) Priska Ming-Nufer	0	0	x	6	DNF	0	DNS	0	2	0	NE	8
45	(Italy) Vicky Bernardi	7	DNF	x	DNF	0	DNF	DNS	0	0	0	NE	7
46	(Poland) Maryna Gąsienica-Daniel	0	0	x	DNS	0	DNS	DNF	2	0	4	NE	6
47	(Austria) Julia Scheib	DNS		x	DNS					5	0	NE	5
48	(Austria) Lisa Grill	1	3	x	DNS							NE	4
	(Austria) Stephanie Brunner	DNS		x	DNS	0	2	DNS		0	2	NE	4
50	(Austria) Nina Ortlieb	DNF	0	x	0	2	DNS					NE	2
51	(Italy) Nadia Delago	DNF	DNS	x	0	0	0	DNS	0	1	0	NE	1
	References												

=== Legend ===
- Winner (100 points)
- 2nd place (80 points)
- 3rd place (60 points)
- DNF = Did not finish
- DSQ = Disqualified
- Did not start (DNS)
- Not eligible for finals (NE)
- Race canceled (x)
- FIS non-World Cup race (World Championships)
- R# = Rescheduled (make-up) race
- Updated at 23 March 2025, after all events.

== See also ==
- 2025 Alpine Skiing World Cup – Women's summary rankings
- 2025 Alpine Skiing World Cup – Women's overall
- 2025 Alpine Skiing World Cup – Women's downhill
- 2025 Alpine Skiing World Cup – Women's giant slalom
- 2025 Alpine Skiing World Cup – Women's slalom
- World Cup scoring system
