= List of ski areas in Minnesota =

Minnesota is home to many ski resorts.

== List of ski resorts ==
=== Minnesota ===
- Afton Alps - Afton
- Andes Tower Hills - Kensington
- Buck Hill - Burnsville
- Buena Vista - Bemidji
- Coffee Mill Ski Area - Wabasha
- Detroit Mountain - Detroit Lakes
- Elm Creek - Maple Grove
- Giants Ridge - Biwabik
- Hyland Ski and Snowboard Area - Bloomington
- Lutsen Mountains - Lutsen Township
- Mt. Itasca - Coleraine, Minnesota
- Mount Kato - Mankato
- Powder Ridge - Kimball
- Ski Gull - Nisswa
- Spirit Mountain - Duluth
- Steeplechase Ski and Snowboard Area - Mazeppa
- Welch Village - Welch
- Wild Mountain - Taylors Falls

== See also ==
- List of ski areas and resorts in the United States
