= Buck Hill =

Ski area in Minnesota, United States

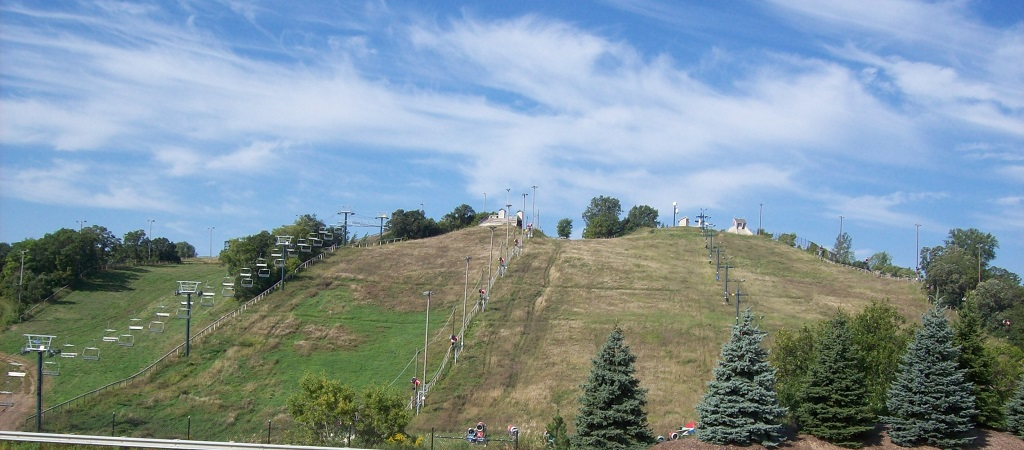
- View from east in July 2014

- Location in the United States Location in Minnesota
- Location: Burnsville, Minnesota, U.S.
- Nearest city: Minneapolis
- Coordinates: 44.724°N 93.283°W
- Vertical: 262 ft (80 m)
- Top elevation: 1,211 ft (369 m)
- Base elevation: 949 ft (289 m)
- Trails: 16 total: 6 easiest; 6 more difficult; 4 most difficult
- Lift system: 2 quad chairlifts 1 triple chairlift 3 rope tows 2 magic carpets 1 snowtubing tow
- Snowfall: 60 inches (150 cm)
- Snowmaking: yes
- Night skiing: every night
- Website: buckhill.com

Buck Hill is a ski hill in the north central United States, located in Burnsville, Minnesota, a suburb south of Minneapolis. It is one of three alpine ski areas in the Twin Cities metropolitan area, along with Afton Alps and Hyland. Buck Hill opened 72 years ago in 1954 and offers ski, snowboard, and tubing trails. Artificial snow is often used to maintain the slopes, because while Minnesota's winters are cold, the average annual snowfall is low for a ski area: less than sixty inches (5.0 ft; 150 cm).

Buck Hill faces east and overlooks adjacent Interstate 35, approximately fifteen miles (24 km) south of downtown Minneapolis. Owned by David and Corrine "Chip" Solner, the ski area is lighted for night skiing and operates three chairlifts (2 quads, 1 triple) and multiple surface tows (trail map). The base area consists of a parking lot and a short strip of lodges. The ski runs use the east face of the hill, with the other sides occupied by residential housing; a municipal water tower shares the summit, and the vertical drop is 310 feet (94 m).

== History ==
Buck Hill was named by early settlers, who noticed its summit was a gathering spot for Mdewakanton Dakota to watch male deer (bucks) drink at Crystal Lake.

The ski area was started by Chuck Stone, who discovered the sport as a child recovering from polio, and had worked as a lift attendant at Suicide Six in Vermont. Returning to Minneapolis, he wanted to start a ski area, and went to the public library to search out viable topography. The present ski area of Buck Hill was the tallest hill close to the Twin Cities, but was on private land, part of a remote farm owned by Grace Whittier. Stone and his girlfriend Nancy convinced Whittier to lease them the property, succeeding where previous wooers had failed, and the ski area began operating in 1954. Whittier left the property to St. Olaf College, in Northfield, Minnesota, upon her death.

== World Cup racers ==
World Cup ski racers Kristina Koznick and Lindsey Vonn learned to ski and race at Buck Hill. Koznick, now retired from international competition, was a top slalom racer. Vonn (née Kildow) races in all five disciplines and is dominant in the speed events. She is among the best female ski racers in history, with four overall World Cup titles (2008, 2009, 2010, 2012) and was the gold medalist in the downhill at the 2010 Winter Olympics. She was also a double gold medalist in the speed events at the 2009 World Championships, taking the downhill and super-G. Vonn has 82 World Cup victories, the second most for female ski racer in the sport's history.

Both were coached by Erich Sailer, an energetic octogenarian from Austria who has been Buck Hill's racing coach since 1969. Sailer was inducted into the National Ski Hall of Fame in 2006. Paula Moltzan also began ski racing at Buck Hill.

== Pro racing ==
The ski area hosted the pro skiing tour in early February 1973 as part of the Saint Paul Winter Carnival. It was raced in a head-to-head parallel format in elimination brackets for both giant slalom and slalom. Two-time defending season champion Spider Sabich won the slalom on Sunday at the McDonald's Cup at Buck Hill. That year's season champion, Olympic triple gold medalist Jean-Claude Killy, won the Saturday giant slalom and was the fastest qualifier in the slalom, but did not place. Killy and Sabich earned $2,500 each for their wins.

Hugo Nindl of Austria won both pro events at Buck Hill in January 1974. He bested Sabich in the slalom final, and went on to win the season title.

== Winter activities ==
- Alpine skiing
- Night skiing
- Snowboarding
- Tubing

== In popular culture ==
Minneapolis band The Replacements wrote a song called "Buck Hill", with lyrics consisting entirely of the words "Buck Hill" shouted repeatedly.

== See also ==
- Ski areas in Minnesota
