= 3 Franco Berthod =

Downhill ski couse in Cortina, Italy

- Interactive map of 3 Franco Berthod
- 45.7°N 6.95°E
- Location: La Thuile, Aosta Valley, Italy

Downhill
- Start: 2,227 m (7,306 ft) (AA)
- Finish: 1,520 m (4,987 ft)
- Vertical drop: 707 m (2,320 ft)
- Length: 2,310 m (7,578.74 ft)
- Max incline: 37.2 degrees (76%)
- Avg incline: 23.7 degrees (44%)
- Min incline: 8 degrees (14%)

3 Franco Berthod is the women's World Cup downhill ski course in La Thuile, Aosta Valley, Italy.

The course is very demanding in the upper part and not hat difficult in lower part of the slope. The steepest part has maximum incline at 76% (37.3 degrees). It is a rare and not a regular World Cup host, as they have for the first time organised World event in 2015/16 season won by Swiss Lara Gut and returned in 2019/20 and 2024/25.

== Course ==
=== Sections ===
- SG Reserve Start
- Curvone Alpe Planey
- Ingresso Della 2
- Salta BAita Di Giorgio

== World Cup ==
=== Women ===
| Season | Date | Event | Winner | Second | Third |
|---|---|---|---|---|---|
| 2015/16 | 19 February 2016 | DH | (Switzerland) Lara Gut | (Austria) Cornelia Hütter | (Italy) Nadia Fanchini |
| 2015/16 | 20 February 2016 | DH | (Italy) Nadia Fanchini | (United States) Lindsey Vonn | (Italy) Daniela Merighetti |
| 2015/16 | 21 February 2016 | SG | (Liechtenstein) Tina Weirather | (Switzerland) Lara Gut | (United States) Lindsey Vonn |
| 2019/20 | 29 Februar 2020 | SG | (Austria) Nina Ortlieb | (Italy) Federica Brignone | (Switzerland) Corinne Suter |
| 2019/20 | 1 March 2020 | AC | cancelled due to heavy snowfall | | |
| 2024/25 | 13 March 2025 | DH | no training due to unfavourable weather conditions; not replaced | | |
| 2024/25 | 13 March 2025 | SG | (Germany) Emma Aicher | (Italy) Sofia Goggia | (Italy) Federica Brignone |
| 2024/25 | 14 March 2025 | SG | switched with cancelled downhill on 13 March (the date used for SG replacement) | | |
| 2024/25 | 14 March 2025 | SG | (Italy) Federica Brignone | (Italy) Sofia Goggia | (France) Romane Miradoli |

Replacement for St. Moritz (2025).
