= Erich Sailer =

American ski coach (1925–2025)

Erich Sailer (November 7, 1925 - August 2025) was an Austrian-born ski coach based in the United States. He was the racing coach and director of Buck Hill in Burnsville, Minnesota, where he coached from 1969 to 2022. Sailer is a member of the US Ski and Snowboard Hall of Fame.

== Career ==
Erich Josef Johann Sailer was born in 1925 in Telfs, Austria.

After a move to Vancouver, Canada, Sailer established summer ski racing in North America with a camp he operated in Oregon at Mount Hood and later operated another camp in Montana which grew into the largest ski-racing camp before moving to Minnesota in 1969. He was the youth coach for future Olympians Lindsey Vonn, Kristina Koznick, Julia Mancuso, Tasha Nelson, Sarah Schleper, and Resi Stiegler. Sailer also coached Vonn's father Alan.

He was inducted into the Ski and Snowboard Hall of Fame in 2005, the first development coach recognized with that honor.

Sailer died in August 2025 in Edina, Minnesota from complications of falls at the age of 99. He was survived by his wife Ursula, a daughter, Martina, and two grandchildren.
