= Lindsey Vonn =

American alpine skier (born 1984)

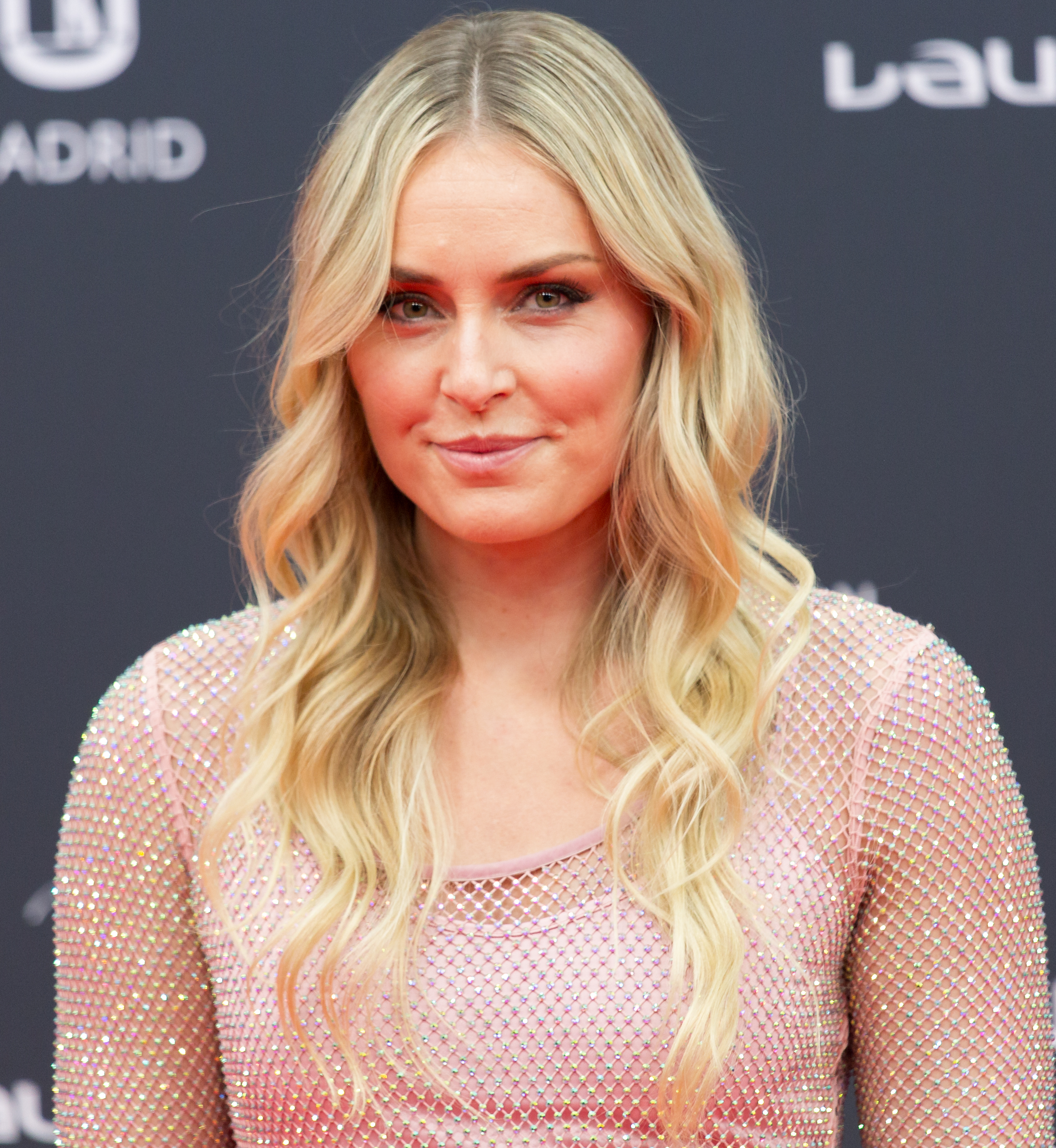
- Vonn in 2024

Personal information
- Born: Lindsey Caroline Kildow; October 18, 1984 (age 42) Saint Paul, Minnesota, U.S.
- Height: 5 ft 10 in (178 cm)
- Website: LindseyVonn.com

Skiing career
- Country: United States
- Sport: Alpine skiing
- Club: Ski & Snowboard Club Vail
- Retired: February 10, 2019 – November 14, 2024
- Disciplines: Downhill, Super-G, Giant slalom, Combined (also Slalom before 2012)
- World Cup debut: November 18, 2000 (age 16)

Olympics
- Teams: 5 – (2002, 2006, 2010, 2018, 2026)
- Medals: 3 (1 gold)

World Championships
- Teams: 9 – (2005, 2007, 2009, 2011, 2013, 2015, 2017, 2019, 2025)
- Medals: 8 (2 gold)

World Cup
- Seasons: 21 – (2001–2019, 2025–2026)
- Wins: 84 – (45 DH, 28 SG, 4 GS, 2 SL, 5 SC)
- Podiums: 145 – (71 DH, 49 SG, 6 GS, 5 SL, 13 SC, 1 PSL)
- Overall titles: 4 – (2008–10, 2012)
- Discipline titles: 16 – (8 DH, 5 SG, 3 SC)
Medal record
Women's alpine skiing
Representing the United States
International alpine ski competitions
| Event | 1st | 2nd | 3rd |
|---|---|---|---|
| Olympic Games | 1 | 0 | 2 |
| World Championships | 2 | 3 | 3 |
| World Junior Championships | 0 | 2 | 1 |
| Total | 3 | 5 | 6 |
World Cup race podiums
| Event | 1st | 2nd | 3rd |
|---|---|---|---|
| Downhill | 45 | 17 | 9 |
| Super-G | 28 | 13 | 8 |
| Giant | 4 | 1 | 1 |
| Slalom | 2 | 2 | 1 |
| Combined | 5 | 5 | 3 |
| Parallel | 0 | 0 | 1 |
| Total | 84 | 38 | 23 |
Olympic Games
| Gold medal – first place | 2010 Vancouver | Downhill |
| Bronze medal – third place | 2010 Vancouver | Super-G |
| Bronze medal – third place | 2018 Pyeongchang | Downhill |
World Championships
| Gold medal – first place | 2009 Val-d'Isère | Downhill |
| Gold medal – first place | 2009 Val-d'Isère | Super-G |
| Silver medal – second place | 2007 Åre | Downhill |
| Silver medal – second place | 2007 Åre | Super-G |
| Silver medal – second place | 2011 Garmisch | Downhill |
| Bronze medal – third place | 2015 Beaver Creek | Super-G |
| Bronze medal – third place | 2017 St. Moritz | Downhill |
| Bronze medal – third place | 2019 Åre | Downhill |
World Junior Championships
| Silver medal – second place | 2003 Puy St. Vincent | Downhill |
| Silver medal – second place | 2004 Maribor | Downhill |
| Bronze medal – third place | 2004 Maribor | Giant slalom |

Lindsey Caroline Vonn (née Kildow /ˈkɪldaʊ/; born October 18, 1984) is an American alpine ski racer. She won four World Cup overall championships with titles in 2008, 2009, 2010, and 2012. Vonn won the gold medal in downhill at the 2010 Winter Olympics, the first one for an American woman. She also won a record eight World Cup season titles in the downhill discipline (2008–2013, 2015, 2016), five titles in super-G (2009–2012, 2015), and three consecutive titles in the combined (2010–2012). In 2016, she won her 20th World Cup crystal globe title, the overall record for men or women, surpassing Ingemar Stenmark of Sweden, who won 19 globes from 1975 to 1984. She has the third highest super ranking of all skiers, men or women.

Vonn is one of six women to have won World Cup races in all five disciplines of alpine skiing – downhill, super-G, giant slalom, slalom, and super combined – and (as of January 22, 2026) has won 84 World Cup races in her career. When she retired in 2019, her total of 82 World Cup victories was a women's record that stood until January 2023, when it was surpassed by Mikaela Shiffrin. Only Shiffrin and Stenmark have more victories than Vonn, with the record held by Shiffrin. With her Olympic gold and bronze medals, two World Championship gold medals in 2009 (plus three silver medals in 2007 and 2011), and four overall World Cup titles, Vonn is one of the most successful American ski racers, and is considered one of greatest alpine skiers of all time.

In 2011, Vonn received the Laureus World Sportswoman of the Year award, and was the United States Olympic Committee's sportswoman of the year. Injuries caused Vonn to miss parts of several seasons, including almost all of the 2014 season and most of the 2013 season. While recovering from injury, she worked as a correspondent for NBC News, covering the 2014 Winter Olympics in Sochi, Russia. In 2019, she announced her retirement, citing her injuries. Vonn returned to competitive skiing in November 2024, and became the oldest downhill skiing World Cup winner at the age of 41.

== Early life ==
Born Lindsey Caroline Kildow in Saint Paul, Minnesota, she is the daughter of Linda Anne (née Krohn) and Alan Lee Kildow. She grew up in the Twin Cities metropolitan area in Burnsville, Minnesota. Her father is of Irish ancestry and her mother was of German and Norwegian ancestry. Kildow was on skis at age two before moving into Erich Sailer's renowned development program at Burnsville's Buck Hill, which also produced slalom racer Kristina Koznick. Her father, who had won a national junior title before a knee injury at 18, "pushed" her very hard, according to Sailer.

When Kildow was 9 years old, she met Olympic gold medalist ski racer Picabo Street, whom she considers her hero and role model. Their meeting made such an impression on Street that she remembered the meeting and later served as Kildow's mentor in skiing. On watching Kildow ski for the first time in a 1999 event, Street marveled at her knack for following the fall line, and was quoted as saying: "The faster she went, the bigger the smile she got on her face. You can't teach somebody to love the fall line like that little girl loved the fall line." Kildow commuted to Colorado to train for several years before her family moved to Vail, Colorado in the late 1990s.

Kildow attended University of Missouri High School, an online program through the university's Center for Distance and Independent Study. She speaks German fluently.

== Skiing career ==
=== Early years ===
Lindsey Kildow was taught to ski by her grandfather, Don Kildow, in Milton, Wisconsin. She began skiing as a child in Burnsville, Minnesota, at Buck Hill, and through family vacations that included 16-hour drives from Minnesota to Vail, Colorado. In an interview with The New York Times, Vonn later stated, "I would be in the back under a sleeping bag, and she'd (her mother, Linda) be driving and singing along to some Eric Clapton tape."

In the late 1990s, Kildow and her siblings and mother stopped commuting from Minnesota to Colorado and instead moved to Colorado to ski exclusively at Ski Club Vail. During her first SCV year in Vail, Kildow and one of her sisters skied together in the same "gravity corps" SCV group. It was during that first season that she and her family were contemplating if the entire family should move from Minnesota to Colorado. She later said, "Vail was wonderful to me, but I missed all the traditional things of childhood – sleepovers, school dances, making friends in a conventional way." Halfway through the second season, her siblings also moved to Vail. "Now all my brothers and sisters had left their friends for me. That was stressful on them. I felt so guilty."

However, the move paid off because in 1999, Kildow and Will McDonald became the first American athletes to win the "Cadets" slalom events in Italy's Trofeo Topolino di Sci Alpino. After climbing through the ranks of the U.S. Ski Team, she made her World Cup debut at age 16 on November 18, 2000, in Park City, Utah.

=== 2002–2005 ===
In her Olympic debut at the 2002 Winter Olympics at age 17, Kildow raced in both slalom and combined in Salt Lake City, with her best result coming with sixth in combined. On March 4, 2003, she earned a silver medal in downhill in the Junior World Championship at Puy Saint-Vincent, France.

Kildow credits a change in her attitude toward training to a bike ride with fellow ski racer Julia Mancuso and Mancuso's father Ciro when Kildow visited them at their home in Lake Tahoe, California. With little biking experience, she quickly found herself miles behind Julia and Ciro. Alone and embarrassed, she realized she needed a drastic revision of her training regimen and her attitude toward training if she was going to be successful.

On March 24, 2004, Kildow was the downhill silver medalist at the U.S. Alpine Championships at Mt. Alyeska Resort, Girdwood, Alaska. Earlier that year, Kildow climbed onto the World Cup podium for the first time with a third-place finish in downhill in January 2004 at Cortina d'Ampezzo, Italy. Her maiden victory in that specialty came at Lake Louise, Alberta, in December 2004. She captured five more World Cup podiums over the next two months.

In 2005, she competed in four races at her first World Championships held in Bormio, Italy, pulling in fourth-place finishes in both the downhill and the combined. She was ninth in super-G, but failed to finish the giant slalom. She cited the unexpected appearance of her father, with whom she has a strained relationship, for rattling her before the event.

=== 2006–2007 ===
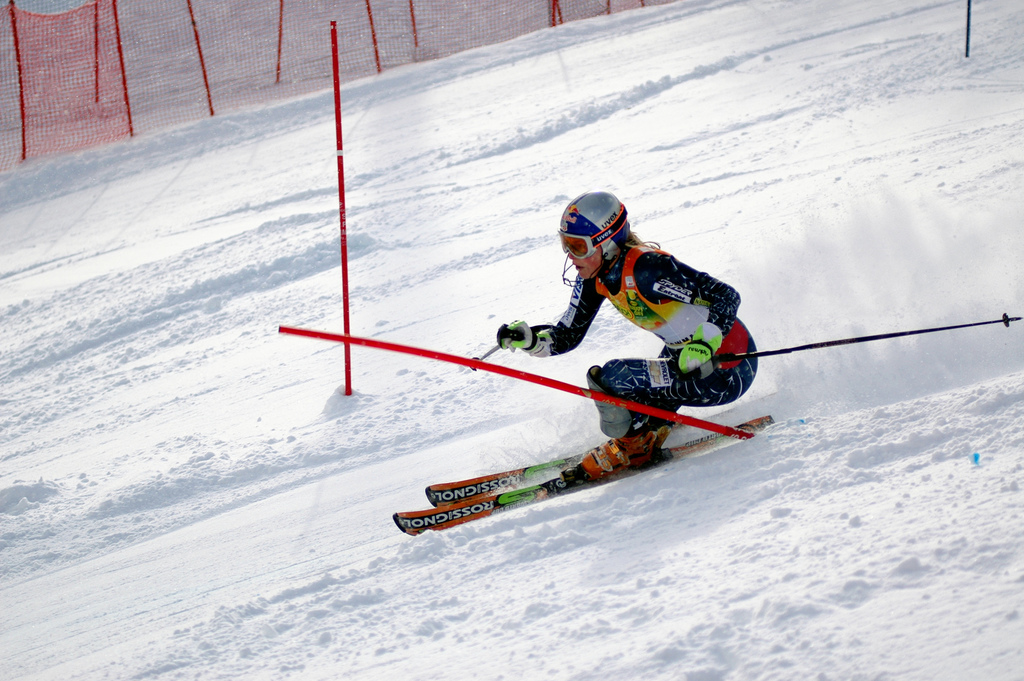
Lindsey Kildow during a slalom race in Aspen in November 2006

At her second Winter Olympics in 2006, Kildow clocked the second-best time in the first practice run yet crashed in the second training run for the downhill race on February 13, 2006, in San Sicario, Italy; she was evacuated by helicopter to Turin and was hospitalized overnight. Despite a bruised hip and strong pains, she returned on the slope 2 days later to compete and finished eighth. The gritty performance earned her the U.S. Olympic Spirit Award, as voted by American fans, fellow Team USA athletes, former U.S. Olympians, and members of the media for best representing the Olympic Spirit.

Kildow earned her first "big race" medals with silver in both downhill and super-G at the 2007 World Championships in Åre, Sweden. A training crash before the slalom caused her a low-level ACL sprain to her right knee, ending her season 4 weeks early. Nevertheless, she finished third for the season in the women's 2007 World Cup disciplines of downhill and super-G.

=== 2008–2010: Winning the overall World Cup for three consecutive years ===
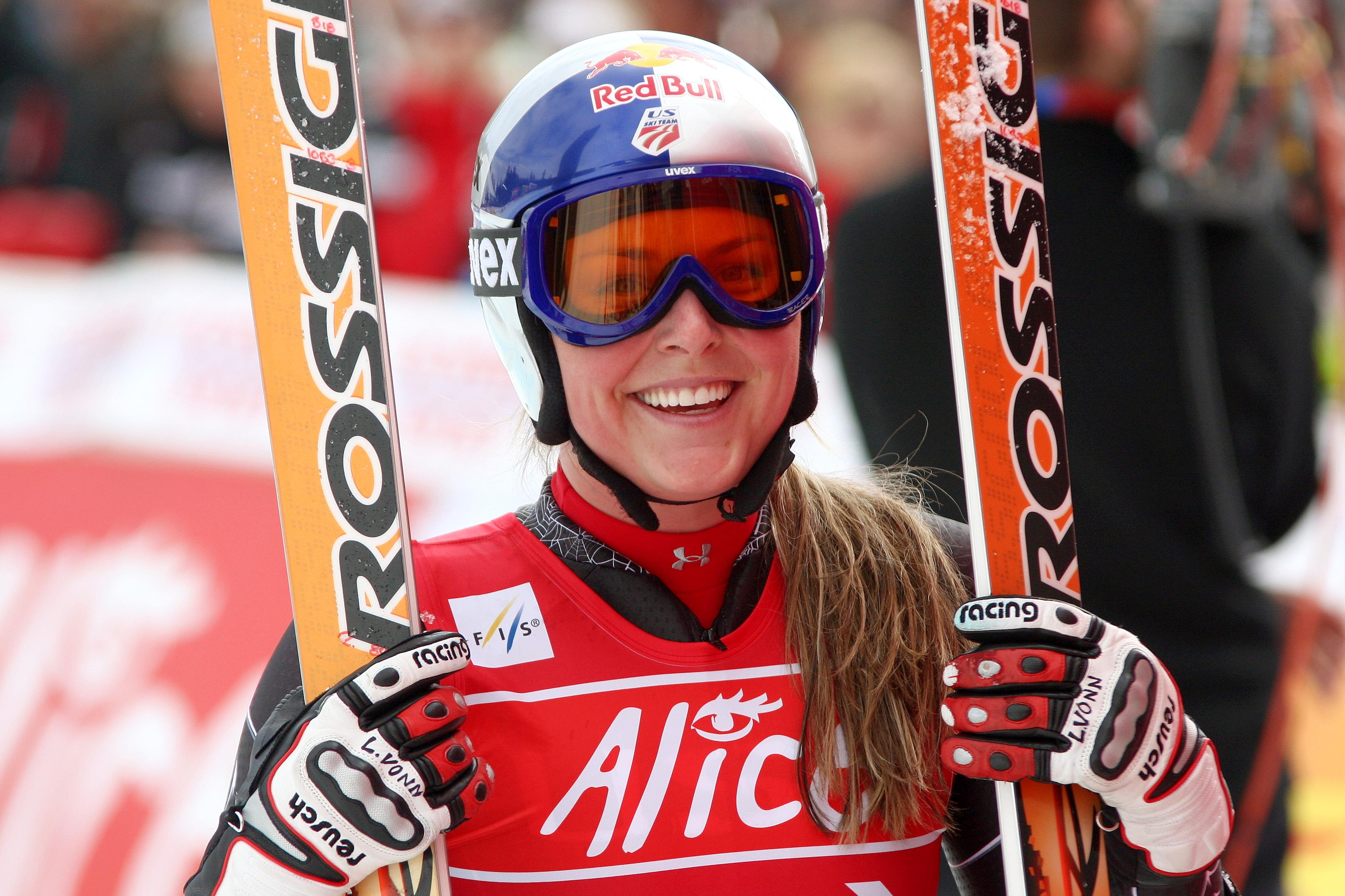
Vonn in March 2008

In 2008, Lindsey Vonn won the overall World Cup title. She became the second American woman to do so, following Tamara McKinney in 1983. American Bode Miller won the men's title to complete the first U.S. sweep of the men's and women's overall titles in 25 years (McKinney and Phil Mahre in 1983). She also won the World Cup season title in the downhill and the U.S. Alpine Championships combined title (downhill & slalom), marking her best ski season to date. Vonn set a new American record for the most World Cup downhill victories with ten, winning at Crans-Montana, Switzerland, on March 8.

In 2009, Vonn repeated as overall World Cup champion, repeated as downhill champion and also won the season championship in super-G by winning the final race of the season. During the season, she broke McKinney's American record of 18 World Cup victories when she won the super-G at Tarvisio in February. Her nine World Cup wins also set an American single-season record, surpassing Mahre's total of eight in 1982. At the 2009 World Championships in Val-d'Isère, France, Vonn won her first world championship and became the first American woman to win the world super-G title. In the super combined event, she won the downhill portion and had appeared to have finished second in the event with a strong slalom performance, but was disqualified for splitting a gate. Three days later she won the gold in the downhill. During early 2009, she appeared in Alka-Seltzer television commercials in the United States as support for the United States Ski Team. During the summer of 2009, Vonn switched her equipment sponsor and supplier to Head skis, after previously racing her entire career on Rossignol skis. In October 2009, Vonn was awarded the Skieur d'Or Award, by members of the International Association of Ski Journalists for her performances during the previous season.

In December 2009, Vonn sustained a bruised arm after a crash during the opening run of the World Cup giant slalom. She continued racing as there was no fracture that would prevent her return and run at the Olympic Games in Vancouver. Despite skiing with her arm in a brace due to the injury, Vonn won three straight races (two downhills and a super-G) in Haus im Ennstal, Austria, from January 8–10, 2010. The wins raised her to second among American skiers on the all-time career list for World Cup wins with 28, passing Mahre and trailing only Bode Miller. On January 14, Vonn was named Colorado Athlete of the Year for 2009. With her victory in a super-G just prior to the 2010 Winter Olympics, she clinched her second straight super-G discipline title with two races still to go. Vonn ended up also winning the overall title, as well as the discipline titles in downhill, super-G and combined, and by winning the last super-G of the season, she boosted her overall World Cup victory total to 33, surpassing Miller for the most World Cup victories by an American. The third consecutive overall World Cup title also equalled Mahre's American record and made Vonn the third woman to achieve it, behind Petra Kronberger with 3 straight and Annemarie Moser-Pröll with 5 straight. Vonn was also named by the Associated Press as 2010 Female Athlete of the Year.

=== 2010 Winter Olympics ===
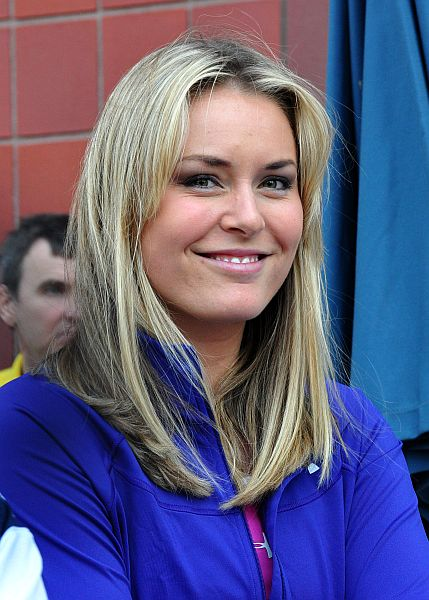
Vonn at the 2010 Arthur Ashe Kids Day in Queens, New York, August 2010

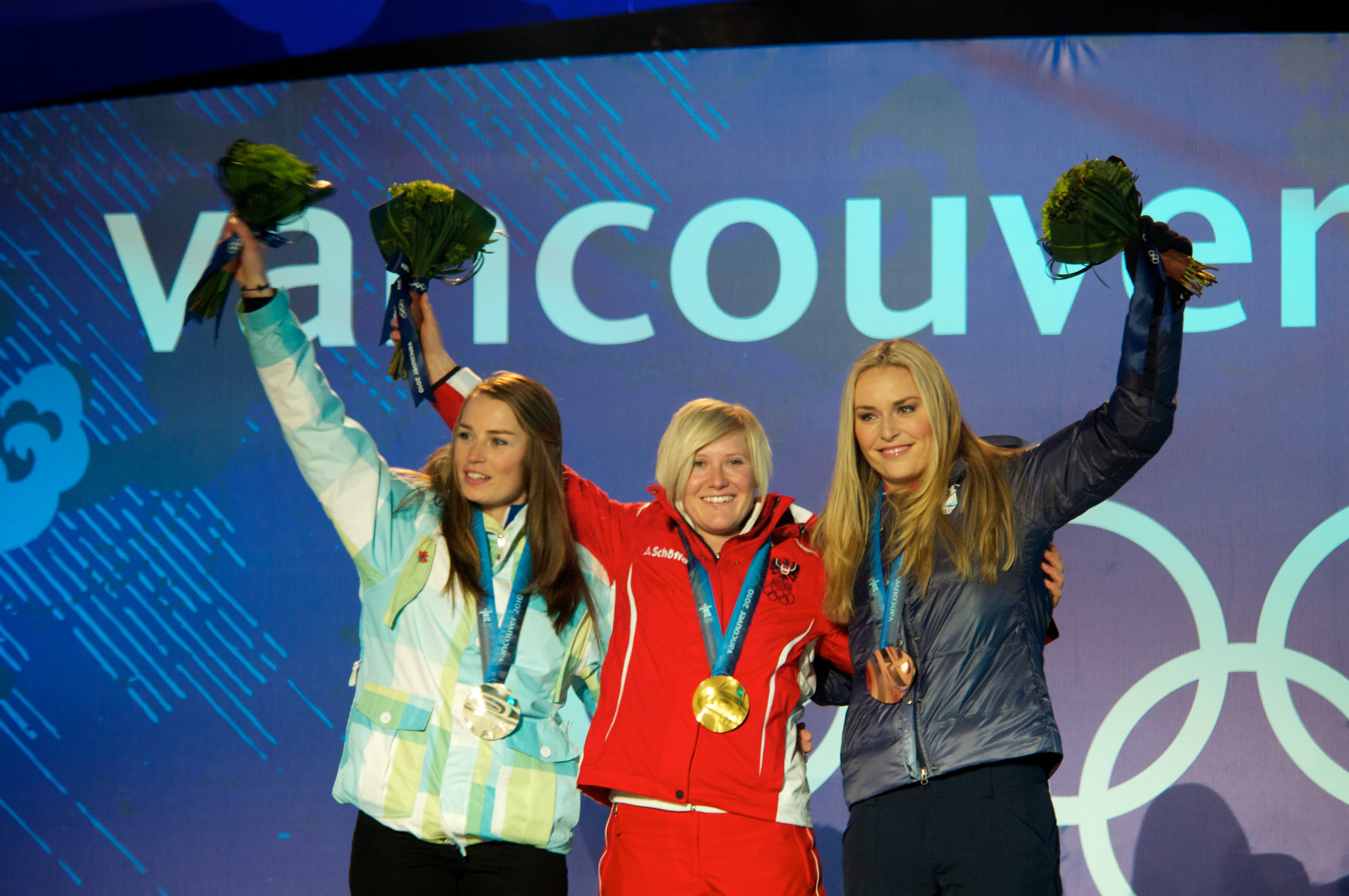
From left to right: Tina Maze of Slovenia (silver), Andrea Fischbacher of Austria (gold), and Vonn of the U.S. (bronze) with the medals they earned in the super-G

At the 2010 Winter Olympics in Vancouver, Vonn planned to compete in all five women's alpine events. On February 10, she revealed she had severely bruised her shin in training the previous week. Vonn said the pain from her injury was "excruciating" and she would have a difficult time competing at the Winter Olympics. Due to unseasonably warm weather and resultant poor snow conditions, many of the Alpine skiing events were moved back, giving Vonn additional time to heal. On February 17, in her first event, Vonn won the gold medal in the downhill at Whistler Blackcomb, beating longtime U.S. rival Julia Mancuso by 0.56 seconds and becoming the first American woman to win Olympic gold in downhill.

In her second event, the super combined, Vonn finished first in the downhill portion of the race. In the slalom portion, however, she crashed when she failed to get her ski around a right-hand gate. Vonn said her shin was not the problem. Gold and silver were won by Maria Riesch and Julia Mancuso respectively. In her third event, the super-G, Vonn finished third behind Andrea Fischbacher and Tina Maze, 0.74 seconds behind Fischbacher's winning time. Afterwards, Vonn said she did not ski the last part of the course as aggressively as she could have and lost the race as a result. In her fourth event, the giant slalom, fog affected visibility. Vonn crashed in her first run, resulting in a broken fourth finger and her disqualification from the event. In her fifth event, the slalom, Vonn lost control and straddled a gate, disqualifying her from the event.

=== 2011: Losing the overall World Cup to Maria Riesch by 3 points ===
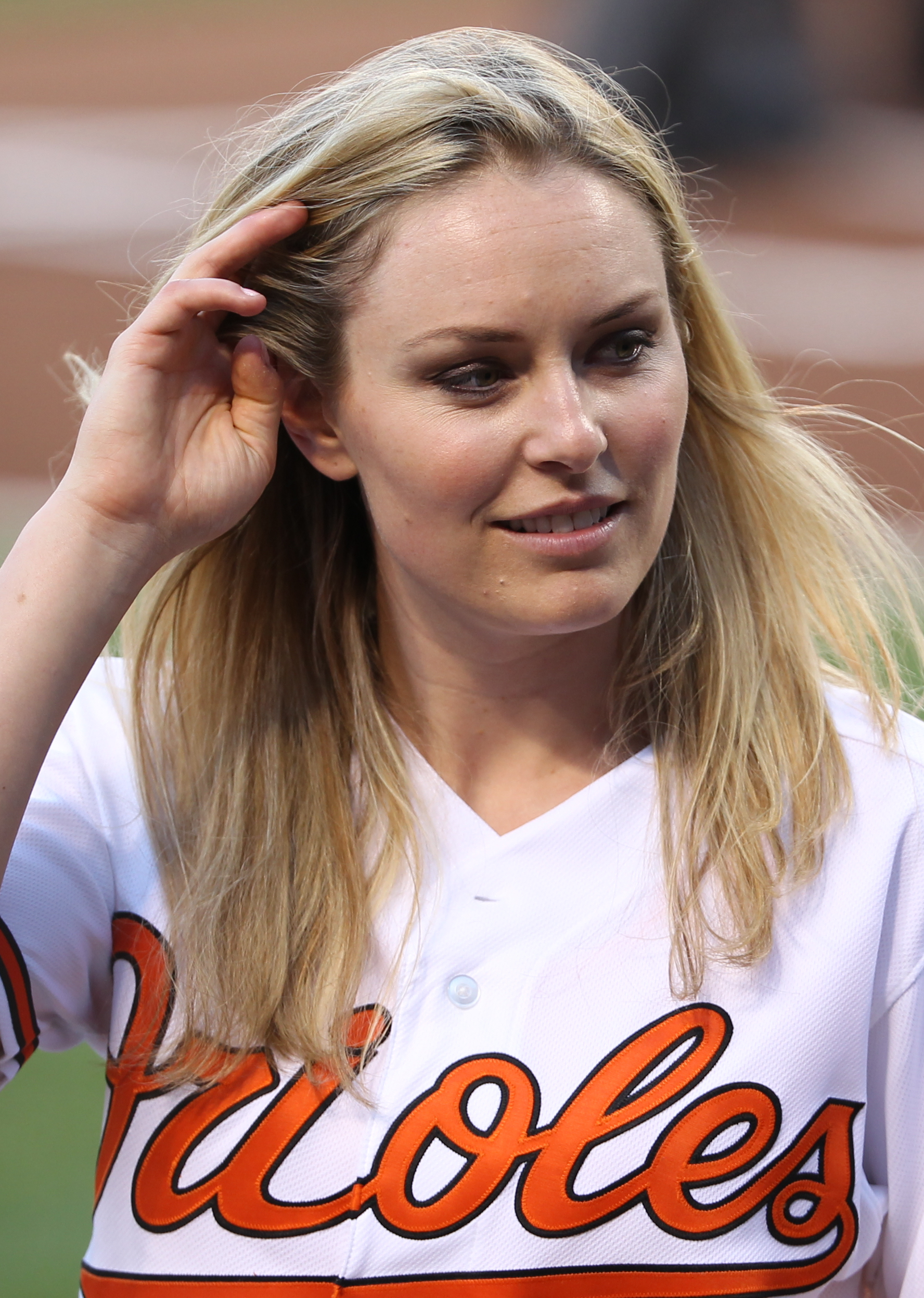
Vonn at a game between the Boston Red Sox and Baltimore Orioles, April 2011

After 3 consecutive overall World Cups, Vonn faced more serious competition from Maria Riesch of Germany in 2011. Riesch had a strong start to the season by winning 2 downhills in Lake Louise, Alberta, where Vonn had won 7 races. Vonn placed on the podium in every speed race but failed to finish in several slaloms. Riesch had 5 podiums in the first 6 slaloms and was significantly ahead in the overall ranking by the end of January. At the 2011 World Championships in Garmisch-Partenkirchen, Germany, Vonn suffered from a concussion she acquired during training a week earlier. She started in 2 events and achieved a seventh place in super-G and a silver medal in downhill.

Back to World Cup and healthy again, Vonn finished ahead of Riesch in several races (including a giant slalom she finished third, best career result in GS until then), she took overall lead for first time that season after downhill event of the World Cup finals in Lenzerheide. The super-G was cancelled due to poor weather conditions, and after the slalom Riesch regained the overall lead by 3 points. The giant slalom was also cancelled due to weather and Riesch was the 2011 overall champion.

=== 2012: Joining the all-event winner's club ===
Vonn won her fourth Overall World Cup Title in 2012. The season opened in October in Sölden, Austria, where Vonn had won her first giant slalom. This made Vonn the 6th woman to have won all events at least once.

On December 2–4, 2011, she won all three races in Lake Louise, Alberta (two downhills, one super-G) for her second career 'hat trick', and with her eleventh win at Lake Louise she surpassed Renate Götschl's record for most career wins at a single resort (ten in Cortina d'Ampezzo). On December 7, Vonn notched her first World Cup victory on U.S. snow, at Beaver Creek, Colorado. Due to a lack of snow in France, its super-G was rescheduled in advance for a Wednesday on the Birds of Prey course. Her limited success on U.S. snow was primarily due to a lack of speed events; only three have been run in the U.S. during her career. It was the first home win by an American woman in 17 years, since Hilary Lindh of Alaska won the downhill in nearby Vail in 1994. With further victories in January 2012, she overtook Götschl to become the third most successful female World Cup racer in terms of victories. On February 4, Vonn achieved her fiftieth World Cup victory on the Kandahar downhill course at Garmisch-Partenkirchen, Germany. The win also gave her 25 career downhill victories, surpassing Götschl for second most career DH wins. With a podium finish in Russia on February 18, Vonn clinched the season title in downhill, her fifth consecutive in that discipline.

Vonn expressed disappointment that she missed the FIS Alpine Record for 2,000 points in a season by 20 points. In her final race of the season at Schladming, Austria, she was not able to improve on her first giant slalom run after losing her pole at the starting gate. Her 24th finish at Schladming led to her loss of a potential 20-plus points for her season record. "It was possible to get those 20 points, I was in a good position ... If you work so hard to reach your goal but you lose your pole in the very last run, that's hard to take. It will give me even more motivation for next season", commented Vonn after the race.

=== 2013 ===
Vonn got off to a slow start in the 2013 season, slowed by illness with marginal results in giant slalom and skipping a pair of slalom races in November 2012. She came back quickly once the speed events started, again sweeping all three races in Lake Louise, Alberta from November 30 to December 2 (two downhills, one super-G) for her third career 'hat trick', and increasing her record for most career wins at a single resort to 14. The three wins increased her career total to 56, moving her past Vreni Schneider into second place all-time among women behind Annemarie Moser-Pröll with 62.

After some disappointing results, Vonn announced her decision on December 17 to take a break from the World Cup circuit to fully recover from her earlier illness. She returned and finished in 6th place on January 6 in her first downhill race since her break. Two weeks later, she won the downhill in Cortina d'Ampezzo and a week later, she won the giant slalom in Maribor, Slovenia.

==== World Championships ====
At the first marathon of the 2013 World Championships in Schladming, Austria, Vonn crashed in the super-G and was airlifted to a nearby hospital. She tore her anterior cruciate ligament and medial collateral ligament in her right knee, with a tibial plateau fracture. Vonn said she would be ready for the 2014 Winter Olympics despite her injury.

==== World Cup Finals ====
Before her season-ending crash on February 5 in Schladming, Vonn led in the World Cup downhill standings with 340 points. Several were within reach of taking the title during her absence from the tour. Overall champion Tina Maze, who trailed Vonn by more than a hundred points, took a 4th-place finish in Méribel and a win in Garmisch-Partenkirchen to close the gap to a single point with one race remaining at the World Cup finals in Lenzerheide. Weather conditions were in Vonn's favor, as officials canceled the race after numerous delays due to a thick fog on the lower section. As a result, she won her sixth downhill season title despite not competing in a downhill since mid-January.

=== 2014 ===
Vonn traveled to Austria for the first race of the 2014 Alpine Skiing World Cup, but ultimately decided not to compete during the first weekend. She announced plans to return to competition in late November. On November 20, 2013, Vonn re-injured her right knee straining it and partially tearing her right ACL after a crash during training. She returned to competition on December 6, finishing 40th the first of two downhill races in Lake Louise, Alberta, then 11th in the second downhill on December 7, followed by a 5th place in the super-G on December 8. In December, she said of her preparation for the 2014 Winter Olympics that "I'm going to play it safe and race minimal races, so I can get the confidence and the timing and the feeling of racing again. I'm really going to be safe and smart as I can."

On January 7, 2014, Vonn announced that she would not compete in the 2014 Winter Olympics because she had re-injured her right knee on December 21, 2013, while skiing in France. "I am devastated to announce that I will not be able to compete in Sochi. I did everything I possibly could to somehow get strong enough to overcome having no ACL but the reality has sunk in that my knee is just too unstable to compete at this level. I'm having surgery soon so that I can be ready for the World Championships at home in Vail next February. On a positive note, this means there will be an additional spot so that one of my teammates can go for gold. Thank you all so much for all of the love and support. I will be cheering for all of the Olympians and especially team USA!" ESPN posted a reference to her announcement, a few hours after Vonn wrote the aforementioned on her Facebook page.

=== 2015: Comeback ===
Vonn made her comeback to the top of the podium on December 6, 2014, at the women's World Cup downhill race at Lake Louise, Alberta, winning the event in only her second race back. In January 2015, she tied and then overtook Austrian Annemarie Moser-Proell for the most World Cup wins ever.

At the 2015 World Championships in Vail / Beaver Creek, Colorado, Vonn won a bronze medal in the first of ladies' events, the super-G. She placed 5th in the downhill race and 14th in the giant slalom race.

On March 18, 2015, Vonn won the last World Cup downhill race at Méribel, France and claimed the World Cup downhill title for the seventh time. Vonn tied with Moser-Proell for the women's record of seven globes in one discipline. The next day, Vonn notched her eight victory of the season by winning the last super-G race. With this win, Vonn took the super-G season title for a fifth time, tying a record shared by German Katja Seizinger, Austrian Hermann Maier and Norwegian Aksel Lund Svindal. She joined Ingemar Stenmark from Sweden as the only skiers to reach 19 season titles across all disciplines and the overall. Vonn also made a World Cup podium for the 113th time, tying Moser-Proell's women's record.

=== 2016 ===
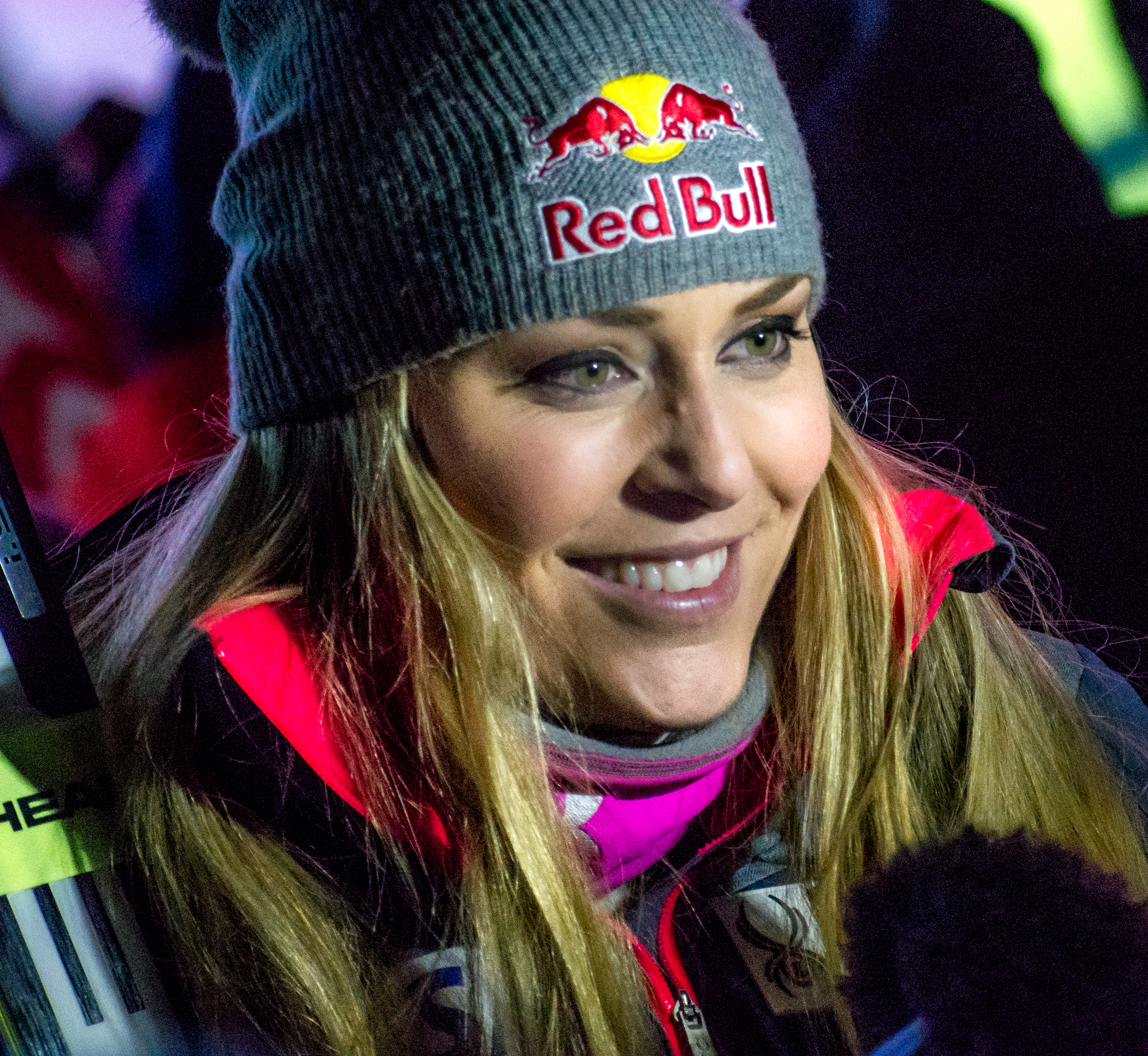
Vonn in February 2016

Vonn started the season by winning the three races contested by women in Lake Louise, Alberta (2 Downhill, 1 Super-G) for her third career victory. This brought her to 70 career World Cup wins, increasing her lead over the previous women's world record holder for most World Cup podiums by a woman (Austrian Annemarie Moser-Proell, 62 career victories) and with her 25th Super-G win, she passed Austrian Hermann Maier for most Super-G wins for either gender. In January, Vonn tied the record of Moser-Pröll for all-time downhill victories at 36 with a win at Altenmarkt-Zauchensee, Austria. Because poor snow conditions resulted in a shorter course, the race was uniquely held over two combined runs, similar to slalom and giant slalom races. Two weeks later in Cortina d'Ampezzo, Italy, Vonn broke Moser-Pröll's record with her 37th downhill victory.

=== 2017 ===
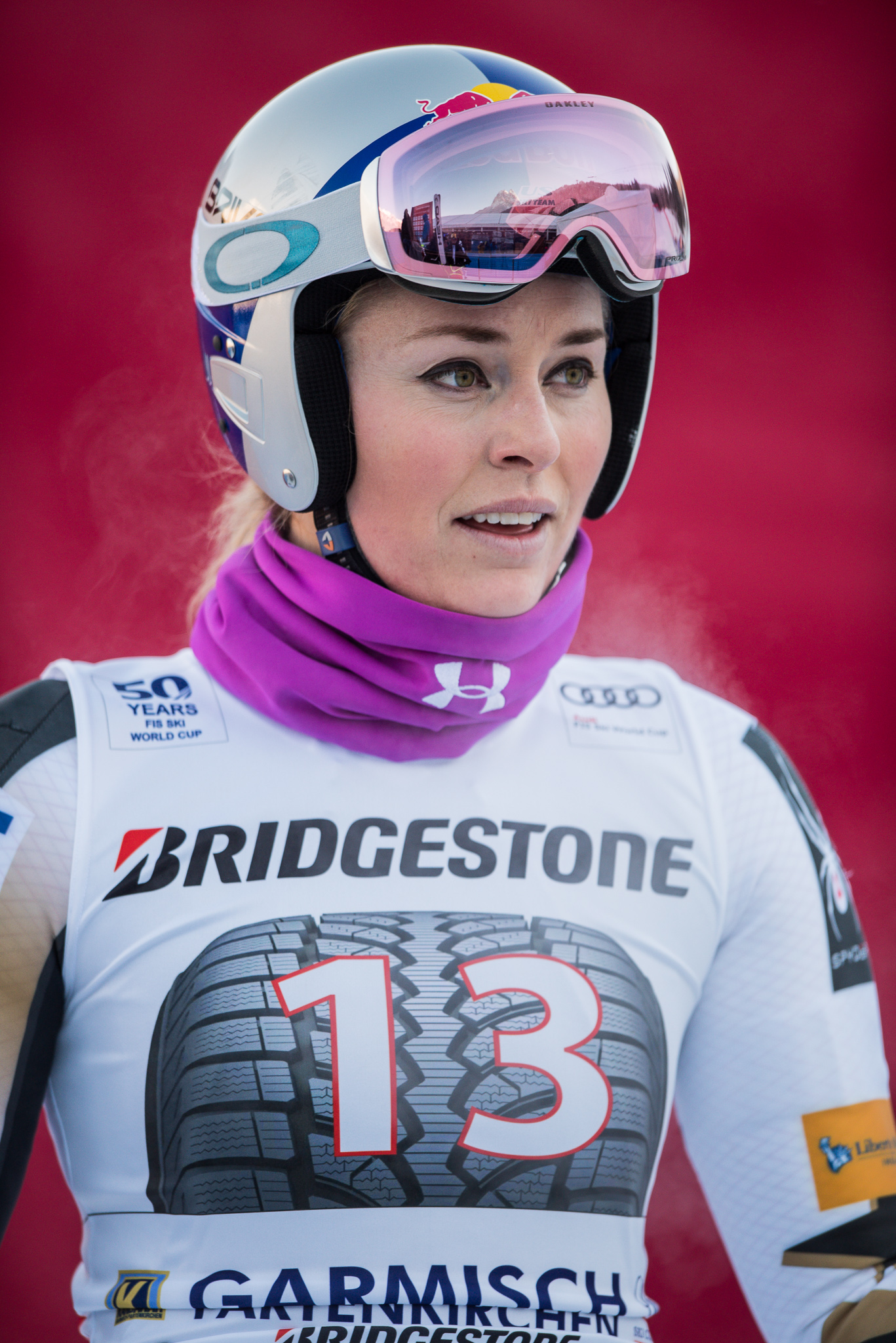
Vonn before the downhill race in Garmisch-Partenkirchen in January 2017, her only victory of the season

On November 11, 2016, Vonn announced on her Facebook page that she had severely fractured the humerus bone of her right arm in a training crash. She had undergone surgery to repair the bone. Vonn returned to the World Cup on January 15, 2017, in the downhill race at Altenmarkt; she finished 13th. On January 20, in her second race back from injury, she won the downhill event in Garmisch-Partenkirchen, Germany, capturing her 77th win.

On December 7, 2017, Vonn stated in an interview she would not be representing President Donald Trump in the 2018 Winter Olympics and would not attend the White House reception if she won a gold medal. Vonn made it clear in her statement that she feels that all Olympians represent the United States people, and not the leaders. She was quoted in the CNN article saying, "Well I hope to represent the people of the United States, not the President."

=== 2018 ===
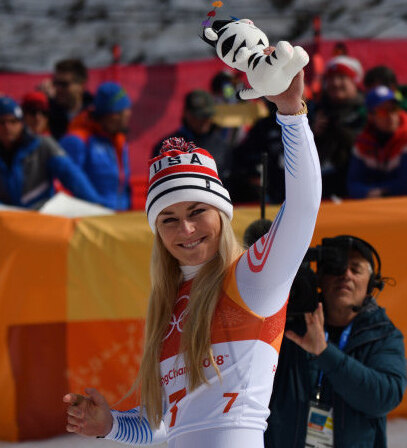
Vonn during the podium ceremony of the 2018 Olympic downhill, where she won the bronze medal

At the 2018 Winter Olympics, Vonn tied for 6th in women's super-G. She won the bronze medal in women's downhill. Vonn dedicated her Olympic races to her grandfather, a Korean War veteran who died the previous November, competing with his initials on her helmet. In a tearful interview following the woman's downhill race, Vonn stated: "Our family never gives up and I never gave up. I kept working hard and I'm really proud of this medal and I know he is too." She later scattered some of her grandfather's ashes near the men's downhill racing course, stating: "I know that it would mean a lot to him to be back here, a part of him is in South Korea always."

=== 2019 ===
In October 2018, ahead of the start of the 2018–19 FIS Alpine Ski World Cup, Vonn announced that she would retire from competition at the end of the season. Having previously suggested that she would continue until she had broken Ingemar Stenmark's record for World Cup race victories, she confirmed that she would retire in 2019 regardless of whether she managed to surpass Stenmark's tally, explaining that "physically, I've gotten to the point where it doesn't make sense... I really would like to be active when I'm older, so I have to look to the future and not just be so focused on what's in front of me". She also said that she aimed to compete in all downhills and super-Gs in the World Cup season, planning to make her debut at Lake Louise, Alberta at the end of November. However the following month, she injured her knee whilst training at Copper Mountain, forcing her to pull out of the Lake Louise races. Subsequently, she announced that she would delay her retirement so she could compete at Lake Louise the following season. Vonn finally made her season debut at Cortina d'Ampezzo in January 2019, finishing 15th and 9th in the two downhills there, before failing to finish the super-G: after the latter race she told reporters that she was considering retiring immediately, stating that she would "give it a couple of days and make some decisions". On February 1, Vonn announced that she would retire after the 2019 World Championships taking place in Sweden. On February 10, after she won a bronze medal in women's downhill, she finally retired from the race circuit, with her wish to get flowers from Stenmark as a goodbye being fulfilled. With the clinching of the bronze, she became the oldest woman to win a medal at a world championship (at age 34) and the first female racer to receive medals at six different world championships.

In 2019, HBO released a documentary about Vonn entitled Lindsey Vonn: The Final Season, which was nominated for two sports Emmy Awards and teed up what ultimately became her memoir, Rise.

=== 2023 ===
In January 2023, Vonn became the first woman to ski the Streif, although on her own and not competitively.

=== 2024–2025: Second comeback ===
On November 14, 2024, Vonn announced she was coming out of retirement and returning to competitive skiing after having a successful knee replacement surgery seven months earlier which stopped the pain that had led to her retirement. She made her return on December 7, 2024, in a downhill race at the FIS Fall Festival at Copper Mountain, Colorado, finishing 24th out of 45 skiers.

On December 21, 2024, Vonn made her comeback to the World Cup in St. Moritz, Switzerland, finishing 14th in the Super-G. In her first World Cup downhill race after returning to the Ski World Cup, she finished sixth on January 11, 2025, in St. Anton, 0.58 seconds behind the winner Federica Brignone. The following day, she improved to fourth place in the Super-G, only being beaten by Lauren Macuga, Stephanie Venier and Federica Brignone. While training for the downhill in Cortina d'Ampezzo, she crashed. She told the press that she had only suffered minor injures. She also announced that she wanted to continue competing in the World Cup until the Olympic Games in Cortina d´Ampezzo. Since the Cortina slope is one of her favorites she would like to end her career there.

Vonn attained her first World Cup podium in seven years when she came second in the super-G at the season finals in Sun Valley, Idaho, on March 23, 2025.

On December 12, 2025, Vonn became the oldest downhill skiing World Cup winner, in St. Moritz, at the age of 41, claiming her 83rd World Cup win and first since 2018. Vonn then finished second in next day's downhill and 4th in the Super-G. It would be the only race of the season in which Vonn finished off the podium.

At the next World Cup stage in Val-d'Isère, Vonn recorded two further podiums, finishing 3rd in the downhill and Super-G.

Vonn continued her strong form into the new year, winning her 84th World Cup race in the downhill at Altenmarkt-Zauchensee and recording third and second place finishes in the downhill and Super-G in Tarvisio the following week. This left Vonn with a commanding lead in the downhill standings going into the Olympic Games, along with third and sixth place in the Super-G and overall standings respectively.

=== 2026 Winter Olympics ===
On December 23, 2025, Vonn qualified for the 2026 Winter Olympics, her fifth Olympic appearance. On January 30, 2026, she suffered a crash in the World Cup downhill in Crans-Montana, the final downhill before the Olympics, and was airlifted off the course. On February 3, 2026, she confirmed she had ruptured her anterior cruciate ligament (ACL) but announced her intention to compete at the Olympics despite the injury. At the Olympics, she suffered another crash during the downhill event on February 8 and was medically evacuated to hospital by helicopter. Her family members later stated that she remained at hospital, and that she had undergone surgery on her broken left leg. Vonn later announced that her injuries included a complex tibia fracture as well as a fracture of the fibular head and tibial plateau. She was named to the Time Magazine Top 100 Most Influential People in Sports 2026.

== Philanthropy ==
In 2015, Vonn founded the Lindsey Vonn Foundation, which provides "essential enrichment and sports-based scholarships and empowerment programs to girls from underserved communities" across the United States. The Foundation has given out over $1 million in scholarships to girls aged 10–18 since its inception. It also hosts Strong Girl Camps designed to support young girls, build their confidence, and get them into sport.

In 2018, Vonn participated in a four-day program at Harvard Business School on "The Business of Entertainment, Media, and Sports".

== Personal life ==
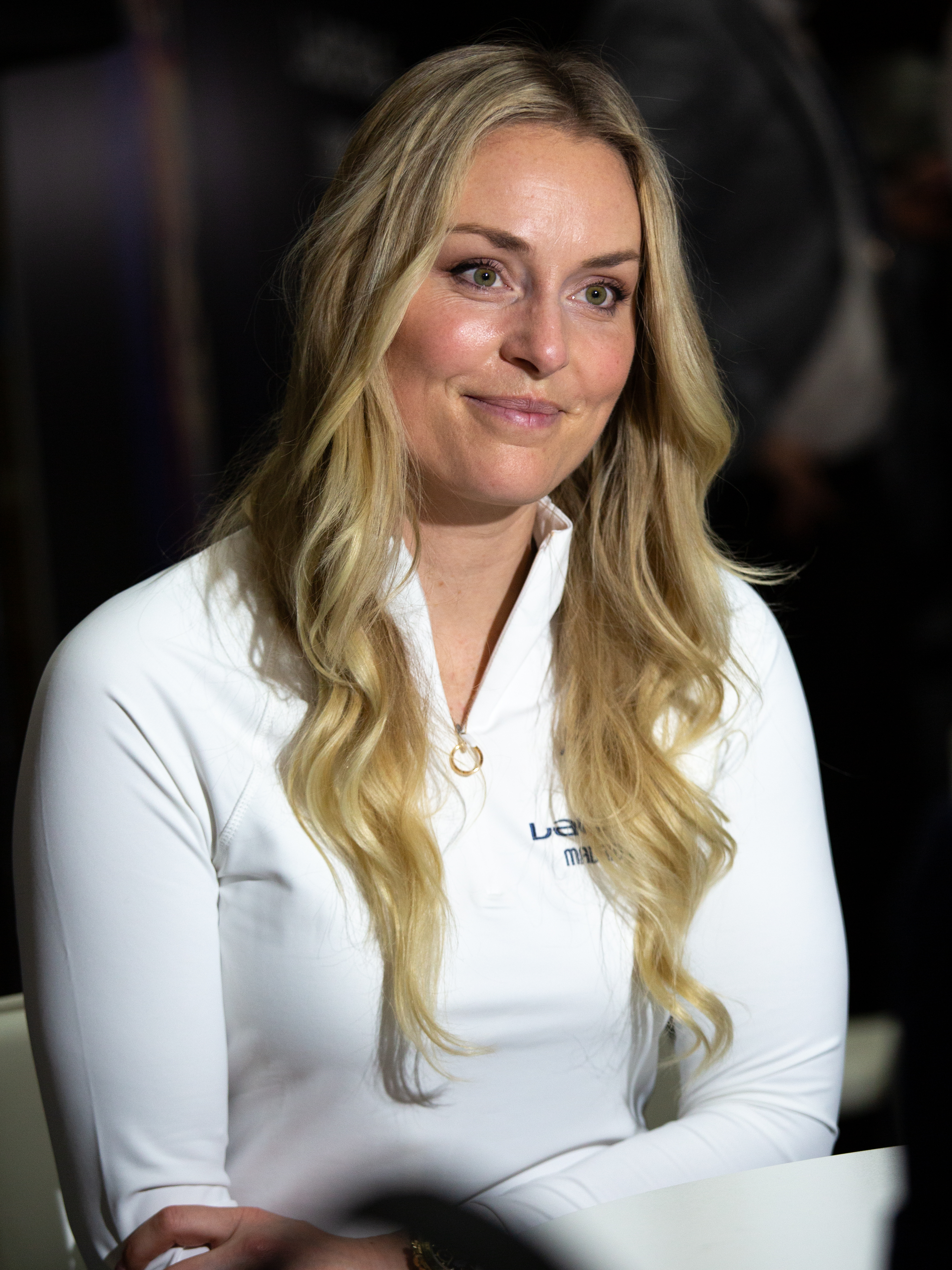
Vonn in April 2024

Lindsey Kildow married fellow 2002 Olympian and former U.S. Ski Team athlete Thomas Vonn on September 29, 2007, at the Silver Lake Lodge in Deer Valley, Utah. In November 2011, after four years of marriage, the couple announced they would divorce. The divorce was finalized on January 9, 2013.

Vonn dated golfer Tiger Woods from March 2013 to May 2015. In late 2016, she began dating National Football League assistant coach Kenan Smith, before splitting in November 2017. In June 2018, she started dating P. K. Subban, a defenseman in the National Hockey League. Subban traveled to Åre, Sweden, to watch her win a bronze medal in the FIS Alpine World Ski Championships Downhill on February 10, 2019. On August 23, 2019, Vonn and Subban announced their engagement. In December 2019, Vonn said that she had proposed to Subban. In May 2020, the couple purchased a villa in Beverly Hills for $6.75 million. On October 21, 2020, they were announced as members of the ownership group of Angel City FC, a Los Angeles-based team set to start play in the National Women's Soccer League in 2022. On December 29, they both announced their break-up on Instagram. Vonn announced that the two had separated, but remained friends.

In 2021, Vonn began a relationship with Diego Osorio, co-founder of tequila company Lobos 1707. The couple later announced their split in February 2025.

In September 2026, Vonn and French skier Matthieu Bailet publicly announced their relationship.

In 2005, after winning a downhill race at Val d'Isère, Vonn was offered a pregnant Tarine cow. Vonn decided to keep the cow, who she named "Olympe" and placed in the care of an Austrian farmer she knew. In 2009, she won a goat, which she gave to a different farmer in Austria. In 2014, she won a calf in Val d'Isère, which she kept as well. As of 2014, she owned a small herd of cows on the farm.

Vonn's mother, Linda Krohn, died in August 2022, following a one year battle with amyotrophic lateral sclerosis (ALS).

== World Cup results ==
Vonn in March 2010 with eight crystal globes: three large ones for FIS World Cup overall titles and five smaller ones for various discipline titles

=== Season titles ===
20 titles (4 Overall, 8 Downhill, 5 Super-G, 3 Combined)

Season
| Season | Discipline |
| 2008 | Overall |
| 2008 | Downhill |
| 2009 | Overall |
| 2009 | Downhill |
| 2009 | Super-G |
| 2010 | Overall |
| 2010 | Downhill |
| 2010 | Super-G |
| 2010 | Combined |
| 2011 | Downhill |
| 2011 | Super-G |
| 2011 | Combined |
| 2012 | Overall |
| 2012 | Downhill |
| 2012 | Super-G |
| 2012 | Combined |
| 2013 | Downhill |
| 2015 | Downhill |
| 2015 | Super-G |
| 2016 | Downhill |

=== Season standings ===
Season
| Season | Age | Overall | Slalom | Giant slalom | Super-G | Downhill | Combined |
| 2002 | 17 | 93 | — | — | 35 | 41 | — |
| 2003 | 18 | 118 | — | — | — | 47 | — |
| 2004 | 19 | 30 | 38 | 45 | 26 | 14 | — |
| 2005 | 20 | 6 | 28 | 35 | 3rd place, bronze medalist(s) | 5 | 5 |
| 2006 | 21 | 5 | 9 | 49 | 4 | 2nd place, silver medalist(s) | 3rd place, bronze medalist(s) |
| 2007 | 22 | 6 | 37 | — | 3rd place, bronze medalist(s) | 3rd place, bronze medalist(s) | 7 |
| 2008 | 23 | 1st place, gold medalist(s) | 32 | 13 | 6 | 1st place, gold medalist(s) | 2nd place, silver medalist(s) |
| 2009 | 24 | 1st place, gold medalist(s) | 3rd place, bronze medalist(s) | 8 | 1st place, gold medalist(s) | 1st place, gold medalist(s) | 2nd place, silver medalist(s) |
| 2010 | 25 | 1st place, gold medalist(s) | 14 | 28 | 1st place, gold medalist(s) | 1st place, gold medalist(s) | 1st place, gold medalist(s) |
| 2011 | 26 | 2nd place, silver medalist(s) | 19 | 12 | 1st place, gold medalist(s) | 1st place, gold medalist(s) | 1st place, gold medalist(s) |
| 2012 | 27 | 1st place, gold medalist(s) | 20 | 2nd place, silver medalist(s) | 1st place, gold medalist(s) | 1st place, gold medalist(s) | 1st place, gold medalist(s) |
| 2013 | 28 | 8 | — | 20 | 4 | 1st place, gold medalist(s) | — |
| 2014 | 29 | 68 | — | — | 25 | 36 | — |
| 2015 | 30 | 3rd place, bronze medalist(s) | — | 29 | 1st place, gold medalist(s) | 1st place, gold medalist(s) | — |
| 2016 | 31 | 2nd place, silver medalist(s) | 43 | 18 | 3rd place, bronze medalist(s) | 1st place, gold medalist(s) | 5 |
| 2017 | 32 | 19 | — | — | 12 | 4 | — |
| 2018 | 33 | 10 | — | — | 9 | 2nd place, silver medalist(s) | 10 |
| 2019 | 34 | 83 | — | — | — | 32 | — |
| 2025 | 40 | 29 | — | — | 13 | 19 | —N/a |
| 2026 | 41 | 12 | — | — | 13 | 5 | —N/a |

=== Race victories ===
| | Total | Slalom | Giant slalom | Super-G | Downhill | Combined | Parallel |
| Wins | 84 | 2 | 4 | 28 | 45 | 5 | 0 |
| Podiums | 145 | 5 | 6 | 49 | 71 | 13 | 1 |

Season
| Season | Date | Location | Discipline |
| 2005 | December 3, 2004 | Lake Louise, Canada | Downhill |
| 2006; 3 victories (2 DH, 1 SG) | December 3, 2005 | Lake Louise, Canada | Downhill |
| 2006; 3 victories (2 DH, 1 SG) | December 17, 2005 | Val-d'Isère, France | Downhill |
| 2006; 3 victories (2 DH, 1 SG) | March 3, 2006 | Hafjell, Norway | Super-G |
| 2007; 3 victories (2 DH, 1 SG) | December 2, 2006 | Lake Louise, Canada | Downhill |
| 2007; 3 victories (2 DH, 1 SG) | December 20, 2006 | Val-d'Isère, France | Downhill |
| 2007; 3 victories (2 DH, 1 SG) | January 28, 2007 | San Sicario, Italy | Super-G |
| 2008; 6 victories (5 DH, 1 SC) | December 1, 2007 | Lake Louise, Canada | Downhill |
| 2008; 6 victories (5 DH, 1 SC) | December 21, 2007 | St. Anton, Austria | Downhill |
| 2008; 6 victories (5 DH, 1 SC) | December 22, 2007 | St. Anton, Austria | Super combined |
| 2008; 6 victories (5 DH, 1 SC) | January 19, 2008 | Cortina d'Ampezzo, Italy | Downhill |
| 2008; 6 victories (5 DH, 1 SC) | February 9, 2008 | Sestriere, Italy | Downhill |
| 2008; 6 victories (5 DH, 1 SC) | March 8, 2008 | Crans-Montana, Switzerland | Downhill |
| 2009; 9 victories (2 DH, 4 SG, 2 SL, 1 SC) | November 15, 2008 | Levi, Finland | Slalom |
| 2009; 9 victories (2 DH, 4 SG, 2 SL, 1 SC) | December 5, 2008 | Lake Louise, Canada | Downhill |
| 2009; 9 victories (2 DH, 4 SG, 2 SL, 1 SC) | January 17, 2009 | Altenmarkt-Zauchensee, Austria | Super combined |
| 2009; 9 victories (2 DH, 4 SG, 2 SL, 1 SC) | January 30, 2009 | Garmisch-Partenkirchen, Germany | Slalom |
| 2009; 9 victories (2 DH, 4 SG, 2 SL, 1 SC) | February 1, 2009 | Garmisch-Partenkirchen, Germany | Super-G |
| 2009; 9 victories (2 DH, 4 SG, 2 SL, 1 SC) | February 22, 2009 | Tarvisio, Italy | Super-G |
| 2009; 9 victories (2 DH, 4 SG, 2 SL, 1 SC) | March 1, 2009 | Bansko, Bulgaria | Super-G |
| 2009; 9 victories (2 DH, 4 SG, 2 SL, 1 SC) | March 11, 2009 | Åre, Sweden | Downhill |
| 2009; 9 victories (2 DH, 4 SG, 2 SL, 1 SC) | March 12, 2009 | Åre, Sweden | Super-G |
| 2010; 11 victories (6 DH, 4 SG, 1 SC) | December 4, 2009 | Lake Louise, Canada | Downhill |
| 2010; 11 victories (6 DH, 4 SG, 1 SC) | December 5, 2009 | Lake Louise, Canada | Downhill |
| 2010; 11 victories (6 DH, 4 SG, 1 SC) | December 18, 2009 | Val-d'Isère, France | Super combined |
| 2010; 11 victories (6 DH, 4 SG, 1 SC) | January 8, 2010 | Haus im Ennstal, Austria | Downhill |
| 2010; 11 victories (6 DH, 4 SG, 1 SC) | January 9, 2010 | Haus im Ennstal, Austria | Downhill |
| 2010; 11 victories (6 DH, 4 SG, 1 SC) | January 10, 2010 | Haus im Ennstal, Austria | Super-G |
| 2010; 11 victories (6 DH, 4 SG, 1 SC) | January 22, 2010 | Cortina d'Ampezzo, Italy | Super-G |
| 2010; 11 victories (6 DH, 4 SG, 1 SC) | January 23, 2010 | Cortina d'Ampezzo, Italy | Downhill |
| 2010; 11 victories (6 DH, 4 SG, 1 SC) | January 31, 2010 | St. Moritz, Switzerland | Super-G |
| 2010; 11 victories (6 DH, 4 SG, 1 SC) | March 6, 2010 | Crans-Montana, Switzerland | Downhill |
| 2010; 11 victories (6 DH, 4 SG, 1 SC) | March 12, 2010 | Garmisch-Partenkirchen, Germany | Super-G |
| 2011; 8 victories (3 DH, 4 SG, 1 SC) | December 5, 2010 | Lake Louise, Canada | Super-G |
| 2011; 8 victories (3 DH, 4 SG, 1 SC) | December 18, 2010 | Val-d'Isère, France | Downhill |
| 2011; 8 victories (3 DH, 4 SG, 1 SC) | December 19, 2010 | Val-d'Isère, France | Super combined |
| 2011; 8 victories (3 DH, 4 SG, 1 SC) | January 8, 2011 | Altenmarkt-Zauchensee, Austria | Downhill |
| 2011; 8 victories (3 DH, 4 SG, 1 SC) | January 21, 2011 | Cortina d'Ampezzo, Italy | Super-G |
| 2011; 8 victories (3 DH, 4 SG, 1 SC) | January 23, 2011 | Cortina d'Ampezzo, Italy | Super-G |
| 2011; 8 victories (3 DH, 4 SG, 1 SC) | February 26, 2011 | Åre, Sweden | Downhill |
| 2011; 8 victories (3 DH, 4 SG, 1 SC) | March 6, 2011 | Tarvisio, Italy | Super-G |
| 2012; 12 victories (5 DH, 4 SG, 2 GS, 1 SC) | October 22, 2011 | Sölden, Austria | Giant slalom |
| 2012; 12 victories (5 DH, 4 SG, 2 GS, 1 SC) | December 2, 2011 | Lake Louise, Canada | Downhill |
| 2012; 12 victories (5 DH, 4 SG, 2 GS, 1 SC) | December 3, 2011 | Lake Louise, Canada | Downhill |
| 2012; 12 victories (5 DH, 4 SG, 2 GS, 1 SC) | December 4, 2011 | Lake Louise, Canada | Super-G |
| 2012; 12 victories (5 DH, 4 SG, 2 GS, 1 SC) | December 7, 2011 | Beaver Creek, United States | Super-G |
| 2012; 12 victories (5 DH, 4 SG, 2 GS, 1 SC) | January 15, 2012 | Cortina d'Ampezzo, Italy | Super-G |
| 2012; 12 victories (5 DH, 4 SG, 2 GS, 1 SC) | January 27, 2012 | St. Moritz, Switzerland | Super combined |
| 2012; 12 victories (5 DH, 4 SG, 2 GS, 1 SC) | January 28, 2012 | St. Moritz, Switzerland | Downhill |
| 2012; 12 victories (5 DH, 4 SG, 2 GS, 1 SC) | February 4, 2012 | Garmisch-Partenkirchen, Germany | Downhill |
| 2012; 12 victories (5 DH, 4 SG, 2 GS, 1 SC) | February 26, 2012 | Bansko, Bulgaria | Super-G |
| 2012; 12 victories (5 DH, 4 SG, 2 GS, 1 SC) | March 9, 2012 | Åre, Sweden | Giant slalom |
| 2012; 12 victories (5 DH, 4 SG, 2 GS, 1 SC) | March 14, 2012 | Schladming, Austria | Downhill |
| 2013; 6 victories (3 DH, 2 SG, 1 GS) | November 30, 2012 | Lake Louise, Canada | Downhill |
| 2013; 6 victories (3 DH, 2 SG, 1 GS) | December 1, 2012 | Lake Louise, Canada | Downhill |
| 2013; 6 victories (3 DH, 2 SG, 1 GS) | December 2, 2012 | Lake Louise, Canada | Super-G |
| 2013; 6 victories (3 DH, 2 SG, 1 GS) | December 8, 2012 | St. Moritz, Switzerland | Super-G |
| 2013; 6 victories (3 DH, 2 SG, 1 GS) | January 19, 2013 | Cortina d'Ampezzo, Italy | Downhill |
| 2013; 6 victories (3 DH, 2 SG, 1 GS) | January 26, 2013 | Maribor, Slovenia | Giant slalom |
| 2015; 8 victories (4 DH, 4 SG) | December 6, 2014 | Lake Louise, Canada | Downhill |
| 2015; 8 victories (4 DH, 4 SG) | December 20, 2014 | Val-d'Isère, France | Downhill |
| 2015; 8 victories (4 DH, 4 SG) | January 18, 2015 | Cortina d'Ampezzo, Italy | Downhill |
| 2015; 8 victories (4 DH, 4 SG) | January 19, 2015 | Cortina d'Ampezzo, Italy | Super-G |
| 2015; 8 victories (4 DH, 4 SG) | January 25, 2015 | St. Moritz, Switzerland | Super-G |
| 2015; 8 victories (4 DH, 4 SG) | March 8, 2015 | Garmisch-Partenkirchen, Germany | Super-G |
| 2015; 8 victories (4 DH, 4 SG) | March 18, 2015 | Méribel, France | Downhill |
| 2015; 8 victories (4 DH, 4 SG) | March 19, 2015 | Méribel, France | Super-G |
| 2016; 9 victories (5 DH, 3 SG, 1 GS) | December 4, 2015 | Lake Louise, Canada | Downhill |
| 2016; 9 victories (5 DH, 3 SG, 1 GS) | December 5, 2015 | Lake Louise, Canada | Downhill |
| 2016; 9 victories (5 DH, 3 SG, 1 GS) | December 6, 2015 | Lake Louise, Canada | Super-G |
| 2016; 9 victories (5 DH, 3 SG, 1 GS) | December 12, 2015 | Åre, Sweden | Giant slalom |
| 2016; 9 victories (5 DH, 3 SG, 1 GS) | January 9, 2016 | Altenmarkt-Zauchensee, Austria | Downhill |
| 2016; 9 victories (5 DH, 3 SG, 1 GS) | January 10, 2016 | Altenmarkt-Zauchensee, Austria | Super-G |
| 2016; 9 victories (5 DH, 3 SG, 1 GS) | January 23, 2016 | Cortina d'Ampezzo, Italy | Downhill |
| 2016; 9 victories (5 DH, 3 SG, 1 GS) | January 24, 2016 | Cortina d'Ampezzo, Italy | Super-G |
| 2016; 9 victories (5 DH, 3 SG, 1 GS) | February 6, 2016 | Garmisch-Partenkirchen, Germany | Downhill |
| 2017 | January 21, 2017 | Garmisch-Partenkirchen, Germany | Downhill |
| 2018; 5 victories (4 DH, 1 SG) | December 16, 2017 | Val-d'Isère, France | Super-G |
| 2018; 5 victories (4 DH, 1 SG) | January 20, 2018 | Cortina d'Ampezzo, Italy | Downhill |
| 2018; 5 victories (4 DH, 1 SG) | February 3, 2018 | Garmisch-Partenkirchen, Germany | Downhill |
| 2018; 5 victories (4 DH, 1 SG) | February 4, 2018 | Garmisch-Partenkirchen, Germany | Downhill |
| 2018; 5 victories (4 DH, 1 SG) | March 14, 2018 | Åre, Sweden | Downhill |
| 2026; 2 victories (2 DH) | December 12, 2025 | St. Moritz, Switzerland | Downhill |
| 2026; 2 victories (2 DH) | January 10, 2026 | Altenmarkt-Zauchensee, Austria | Downhill |

== World Championship results ==
Year
| Year | Age | Slalom | Giant slalom | Super-G | Downhill | Combined | Team combined |
| 2005 | 20 | — | DNF1 | 9 | 4 | 4 | —N/a |
| 2007 | 22 | DNS1 | — | 2 | 2 | DSQ2 | —N/a |
| 2009 | 24 | DNF2 | — | 1 | 1 | DSQ2 | —N/a |
| 2011 | 26 | — | — | 7 | 2 | DNS2 | —N/a |
| 2013 | 28 | — | — | DNF | — | — | —N/a |
| 2015 | 30 | — | 14 | 3 | 5 | DNF2 | —N/a |
| 2017 | 32 | — | — | DNF | 3 | 5 | —N/a |
| 2019 | 34 | — | — | DNF | 3 | DNS2 | —N/a |
| 2021 | 36 | Temporarily retired | | | | | |
| 2023 | 38 | Temporarily retired | | | | | |
| 2025 | 40 | — | — | DNF | 15 | —N/a | 16 |

== Olympic results ==
Year
| Year | Age | Slalom | Giant slalom | Super-G | Downhill | Combined |
| 2002 | 17 | 32 | — | — | — | 6 |
| 2006 | 21 | 14 | DNS1 | 7 | 8 | DNF SL2 |
| 2010 | 25 | DNF1 | DNF1 | 3 | 1 | DNF2 |
| 2014 | 29 | Injured: did not compete | | | | |
| 2018 | 33 | — | — | 6 | 3 | DNF2 |
| 2022 | 37 | Temporarily retired | | | | |
| 2026 | 41 | — | — | — | DNF | — |

== Bibliography ==
- 2016: Strong Is the New Beautiful, (with Sarah Toland) Dey Street Books, ISBN 978-0-0624-0058-1
- 2022: Rise: My Story, Dey Street Books, ISBN 978-0062889447
