= Hyland Hills Ski Area =

Ski area in Minnesota, United States

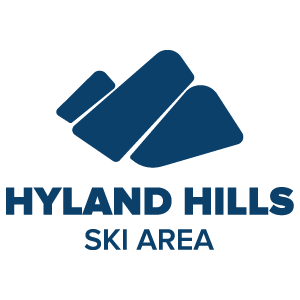

- Location in Minnesota Location in the United States
- Location: Bloomington, Minnesota, U.S.
- Nearest city: Minneapolis
- Coordinates: 44.844°N 93.364°W
- Vertical: 175 ft (53 m)
- Top elevation: 1,075 ft (328 m)
- Base elevation: 900 ft (270 m)
- Trails: 13 total: 3 easiest; 4 more difficult; 4 most difficult 2 Freestyle Terrain
- Lift system: 3 quad chairlifts 3 rope tows 2 magic carpets
- Terrain parks: 2
- Snowfall: 60 in (150 cm)
- Snowmaking: yes
- Night skiing: every night

Hyland Hills Ski Area is a ski area in Bloomington, Minnesota, United States, just south of Minneapolis. It is owned and operated by Three Rivers Park District. As a popular destination located near the Mall of America, Hyland receives 160,001 visitors per year. While Minnesota's winters are cold, the average snowfall is low for a ski area (less than 60 in.); due to this, there is often use of artificial snows to help maintain the viability of the slopes.

In 2016 the chalet underwent a $13.3 million renovation that more than doubled the size of the previous. The new chalet is 36,000 square feet, and includes a gear shop, rentals, and a restaurant. The chalet is also open to hosting private events. Their rope tow, and terrain park are considered by many to be world-class.

Hyland Hills also has a schedule for updating chairlifts. They usually update their chairlifts every 25 years. Hyland has three chairlifts. All are quads. Hyland also has 3 rope tows and 2 magic carpets. Hyland has 4 beginner runs, 3 advanced, 5 intermediate, and 3 terrain parks including the beginner zone terrain park. All terrain parks are accessible by rope tow and in the case of the beginner zone terrain park magic carpet. One of the rope tows the race rope tow is very often closed and only open for race practice.

As early as 1945, the Hyland Hills Ski Area was known as Normandale Ski Hill, with an annual attendance of around 50,000 skiers. After a six-year snow drought, the number of skiers dropped significantly. This caused Normandale to purchase a snowmaker and a sitzlift in an attempt to bring more skiers into the area. The owners, Gordy Bowen and Oscar Strand, found that this did little to help their business as the man-made snow settled into a hard mass, and they did not have the grooming tools necessary to maintain the artificial snow.

Soon after Bowen and Strand's efforts, the Hennepin County Park Reserve District bought the area and renamed it to Hyland Hills Ski Area. With the addition of sophisticated grooming equipment, a new set of buildings, and proper chairlifts, the Hyland Hills Ski Area regained its former popularity.

== Ski Clubs ==
Hyland is home to many different ski and snowboard clubs for a variety of ages and skill levels. Among these is Three Rivers Racing, an Alpine Skiing club for youth aged 6–21 that provides premier coaching for aspiring skiers and has trained racers who end up competing in national, World Cup, and Olympic level races. Hyland also hosts both USSA freestyle skiing and racing teams and the G Team, one of the leading snowboard clubs in the midwest. The Minneapolis Ski Club also offers Nordic Ski Jumping training at the ski jump at Hyland.

== Winter activities ==
- Alpine skiing
- Night skiing
- Snowboarding
- Ski jumping

== Summer activities ==
The park is open in the off-season for a variety of activities that include,

- Auto Shows
- Outdoor cinema
- Live music
- Chairlift rides
- Disc golf
- Hiking
- Happy hour
