= 1989 Alpine Skiing World Cup – Women's overall =

International competition

1989 Women's overall World Cup
Previous: 1988	Next: 1990

Women's overall World Cup 1988/1989

In women's overall World Cup 1988/89 all results count. The parallel slalom did not count for the Overall World Cup.

Place	Name	Country	Total points	Downhill	Super-G	Giant	Slalom	Combined	Note
1	Vreni Schneider	Switzerland	376	0	11	165	175	25
2	Maria Walliser	Switzerland	261	142	27	87	0	5
3	Michela Figini	Switzerland	248	176	29	18	0	25
4	Carole Merle	France	206	67	75	55	0	9
5	Anita Wachter	Austria	157	0	56	59	42	0
6	Mateja Svet	Yugoslavia	154	0	0	106	40	8
7	Ulrike Maier	Austria	150	0	33	60	26	31
8	Michaela Gerg	West Germany	148	91	23	34	0	0
9	Karen Percy	Canada	127	53	13	24	17	20
10	Sigrid Wolf	Austria	119	28	71	20	0	0
11	Tamara McKinney	United States	116	0	0	27	77	12
12	Heidi Zurbriggen	Switzerland	86	41	18	12	0	15
13	Monika Maierhofer	Austria	85	0	0	0	85	0
14	Regine Mösenlechner	West Germany	84	45	27	12	0	0
15	Veronika Wallinger	Austria	78	65	13	0	0	0
16	Ingrid Salvenmoser	Austria	66	0	0	31	35	0
17	Veronika Šarec	Yugoslavia	62	0	0	1	61	0
18	Blanca Fernández Ochoa	Spain	61	0	4	17	40	0
19	Brigitte Oertli	Switzerland	60	9	8	0	7	36
20	Barbara Sadleder	Austria	58	41	9	0	0	8
21	Catherine Quittet	France	57	0	22	35	0	0
22	Camilla Nilsson	Sweden	56	0	0	18	38	0
23	Chantal Bournissen	Switzerland	55	55	0	0	0	0
24	Petra Kronberger	Austria	53	16	12	3	3	19
25	Christine von Grünigen	Switzerland	48	0	0	0	48	0
26	Patricia Chauvet	France	45	0	0	0	45	0
27	Traudl Hächer	West Germany	44	0	12	32	0	0
	Sylvia Eder	Austria	44	13	3	28	0	0
29	Elisabeth Kirchler	Austria	42	31	11	0	0	0
	Christina Meier	West Germany	42	14	0	28	0	0
31	Katjuša Pušnik	Yugoslavia	39	0	0	0	39	0
32	Beatrice Gafner	Switzerland	38	32	0	0	0	6
33	Jolanda Kindle	Liechtenstein	35	0	0	22	13	0
34	Heidi Zeller	Switzerland	31	21	10	0	0	0
35	Claudine Emonet	France	29	21	8	0	0	0
36	Ulrike Stanggassinger	West Germany	28	14	5	0	0	9
37	Katrin Gutensohn	Austria	27	25	2	0	0	0
38	Ulla Lodzinya	Soviet Union	24	12	12	0	0	0
	Cathy Chedal	France	24	0	18	6	0	0
	Zoe Haas	Switzerland	24	1	7	16	0	0
41	Florence Masnada	France	21	0	0	0	9	12
42	Ida Ladstätter	Austria	20	0	0	0	20	0
	Rosi Krenn	West Germany	20	14	0	0	0	6
	Christelle Guignard	France	20	0	0	12	8	0
45	Lucie Laroche	Canada	18	18	0	0	0	0
46	Dorota Mogore-Tlalka	France	17	0	0	0	17	0
47	Anette Gersch	West Germany	16	0	0	0	16	0
	Kendra Kobelka	Canada	16	7	9	0	0	0
49	Karin Dedler	West Germany	15	2	4	9	0	0
	Sandra Burn	Switzerland	15	0	0	15	0	0
51	Tanja Steinebrunner	Switzerland	13	10	0	0	0	3
	Kerrin Lee	Canada	13	11	0	0	0	2
33	Karin Buder	Austria	13	0	0	0	13	0
	Brigitte Gadient	Switzerland	13	0	0	1	12	0
55	Michelle McKendry	Canada	12	8	0	0	0	4
	Claudia Strobl	Austria	12	0	0	0	12	0
57	Corinne Schmidhauser	Switzerland	10	0	0	0	10	0
	Camilla Lundbäck	Sweden	10	0	0	0	10	0
59	Annick Chappot	Switzerland	9	0	0	0	9	0
	Lenka Kebrlová	Czechoslovakia	9	0	0	0	0	9
	Varvara Zelenskaya	Soviet Union	9	9	0	0	0	0
62	Lucia Medzihradská	Czechoslovakia	8	0	0	0	1	7
	Hilary Lindh	United States	8	8	0	0	0	0
64	Hélène Barbier	France	7	0	0	7	0	0
	Pascaline Freiher	France	7	0	0	0	6	1
66	Heidi Voelker	United States	6	0	0	0	6	0
	Kristina Andersson	Sweden	6	0	0	0	6	0
	Diann Roffe	United States	6	0	0	3	3	0
	Béatrice Filliol	France	6	0	0	0	6	0
70	Petra Bernet	Switzerland	5	5	0	0	0	0
	Josee Lacasse	Canada	5	0	0	0	5	0
72	Angelika Hurler	West Germany	4	0	0	4	0	0
	Gabriela Zingre	Switzerland	4	0	0	0	4	0
	Pam Fletcher	United States	4	4	0	0	0	0
75	Lesley Beck	United Kingdom	3	0	0	0	3	0
	Ľudmila Milanová	Czechoslovakia	3	0	0	0	0	3
	Birgit Wolfram	Austria	3	0	0	3	0	0
78	Sabine Ginther	Austria	2	0	2	0	0	0
	Kristin Krone	United States	2	0	2	0	0	0
80	Marlis Spescha	Switzerland	1	1	0	0	0	0
	Ingrid Stöckl	Austria	1	0	0	0	0	1
	Eva Twardonkens	United States	1	0	0	0	1	0

Alpine skiing World Cup
Women

Overall | Downhill | Super-G | Giant slalom | Slalom | Combined

1989
