= 1989 Alpine Skiing World Cup – Women's slalom =

1989 Women's slalom World Cup
Previous: 1988	Next: 1990

Women's slalom World Cup 1988/1989

== Calendar ==
Round	Race No	Place	Country	Date	Winner	Second	Third
1	5	Altenmarkt	Austria	December 16, 1988	(Switzerland) Vreni Schneider	(Socialist Federal Republic of Yugoslavia) Katjuša Pušnik	(United States) Tamara McKinney
2	8	Courmayeur	Italy	December 20, 1988	(Switzerland) Vreni Schneider	(Spain) Blanca Fernández Ochoa	(Austria) Ingrid Salvenmoser
3	9	Maribor	Yugoslavia	January 3, 1989	(Switzerland) Vreni Schneider	(Austria) Monika Maierhofer	(United States) Tamara McKinney
4	12	Mellau	Austria	January 8, 1989	(Switzerland) Vreni Schneider	(Socialist Federal Republic of Yugoslavia) Mateja Svet	(France) Patricia Chauvet
5	16	Grindelwald	Switzerland	January 15, 1989	(Switzerland) Vreni Schneider	(United States) Tamara McKinney	(Austria) Monika Maierhofer
6	25	Furano	Japan	March 3, 1989	(Switzerland) Vreni Schneider	(Socialist Federal Republic of Yugoslavia) Veronika Šarec	(United States) Tamara McKinney
7	28	Shiga Kogen	Japan	March 10, 1989	(Switzerland) Vreni Schneider	(Austria) Monika Maierhofer	(Socialist Federal Republic of Yugoslavia) Veronika Šarec

== Final point standings ==
In women's slalom World Cup 1988/89 all results count.

Place	Name	Country	Total points	5 (Austria)	8 (Italy)	9 (Socialist Federal Republic of Yugoslavia)	12 (Austria)	16 (Switzerland)	25 (Japan)	28 (Japan)
1	Vreni Schneider	Switzerland	175	25	25	25	25	25	25	25
2	Monika Maierhofer	Austria	85	12	-	20	11	15	7	20
3	Tamara McKinney	United States	77	15	-	15	-	20	15	12
4	Veronika Šarec	Yugoslavia	61	2	-	-	12	12	20	15
5	Christine von Grünigen	Switzerland	48	-	10	11	10	8	9	-
6	Patricia Chauvet	France	45	11	-	-	15	9	10	-
7	Anita Wachter	Austria	42	-	12	-	8	-	11	11
8	Blanca Fernández Ochoa	Spain	40	9	20	-	-	11	-	-
	Mateja Svet	Yugoslavia	40	10	-	-	20	10	-	-
10	Katjuša Pušnik	Yugoslavia	39	20	-	10	-	7	-	2
11	Camilla Nilsson	Sweden	38	6	9	-	3	-	12	8
12	Ingrid Salvenmoser	Austria	35	-	15	7	7	-	6	-
13	Ulrike Maier	Austria	26	8	11	4	-	3	-	-
14	Ida Ladstätter	Austria	20	-	8	6	-	6	-	-
15	Dorota Tlałka-Mogore	France	17	-	5	-	2	-	-	10
	Karen Percy	Canada	17	-	-	-	6	-	5	6
17	Anette Gersch	West Germany	16	7	-	-	9	-	-	-
18	Karin Buder	Austria	13	-	-	-	-	5	8	-
	Jolanda Kindle	Liechtenstein	13	-	-	-	-	-	4	9
20	Brigitte Gadient	Switzerland	12	-	-	12	-	-	-	-
	Claudia Strobl	Austria	12	5	-	-	-	-	-	7
22	Corinne Schmidhauser	Switzerland	10	-	-	8	-	-	2	-
	Camilla Lundbäck	Sweden	10	3	3	-	-	-	1	3
24	Annick Chappot	Switzerland	9	-	-	9	-	-	-	-
	Florence Masnada	France	9	-	7	2	-	-	-	-
26	Christelle Guignard	France	8	-	-	-	4	-	-	4
27	Brigitte Oertli	Switzerland	7	-	-	-	6	1	-	-
28	Pascaline Freiher	France	6	-	6	-	-	-	-	-
	Heidi Voelker	United States	6	5	-	-	1	-	-	-
	Kristina Andersson	Sweden	6	-	4	-	-	2	-	-
	Béatrice Filliol	France	6	-	-	1	-	-	-	5
32	Josée Lacasse	Canada	5	-	-	5	-	-	-	-
33	Gabriela Zingre	Switzerland	4	-	-	-	-	4	-	-
34	Petra Kronberger	Austria	3	1	2	-	-	-	-	-
	Lesley Beck	United Kingdom	3	-	-	3	-	-	-	-
	Diann Roffe	United States	3	-	-	-	-	-	3	-
37	Lucia Medzihradská	Czechoslovakia	1	-	1	-	-	-	-	-
	Eva Twardokens	United States	1	-	-	-	-	-	-	1

Alpine skiing World Cup
Women

Overall | Downhill | Super-G | Giant slalom | Slalom | Combined

1989
