= 1988–89 FIS Alpine Ski World Cup =

International sports competition

FIS Alpine Ski World Cup 1988/89
Discipline	Men	Women
Overall	(Luxembourg) Marc Girardelli	(Switzerland) Vreni Schneider
Downhill	(Luxembourg) Marc Girardelli	(Switzerland) Michela Figini
Super G	(Switzerland) Pirmin Zurbriggen	(France) Carole Merle
Giant Slalom	(Norway) Ole Kristian Furuseth (Switzerland) Pirmin Zurbriggen	(Switzerland) Vreni Schneider
Slalom	(West Germany) Armin Bittner	(Switzerland) Vreni Schneider
Nations Cup	Austria	Switzerland
- Nations Cup overall: Switzerland

Competition
Locations	16	15
Individual	31	28

The 23rd World Cup season began in November 1988 in Austria and concluded in March 1989 in Japan. The overall champions were Marc Girardelli of Luxembourg (his third) and Vreni Schneider of Switzerland (her first). Schneider established the record for victories in a World Cup season, winning a total of 14 races (6 (out of 7) giant slaloms, 7 (out of 7) slaloms, and 1 (of 2) combined), surpassing the record of 13 established in 1978-79 by the great Swedish skier and three-time overall World Cup champion Ingemar Stenmark.

Stenmark, who became the primary example of the transition of the World Cup circuit from fully amateur to fully professional during his 16-year career, retired at the end of the season, after notching his all-time record 86th race victory in February. All of Stenmark's victories were either in giant slalom (46) or slalom (40).

The break in the schedule in early February was for the 1989 World Championships, held in Vail, Colorado, USA.

== Calendar ==
=== Men ===
Event Key: DH – Downhill, SL – Slalom, GS – Giant Slalom, SG – Super Giant Slalom, KB – Combined, PS – Parallel Slalom (Nations Cup ranking only)
Race	Season	Date	Place	Type	Winner	Second	Third
633	1	27 November 1988	(Austria) Schladming	SG _{027}	(Switzerland) Pirmin Zurbriggen	(France) Franck Piccard	(Austria) Leonhard Stock
634	2	29 November 1988	(France) Val Thorens	GS _{172}	(Switzerland) Pirmin Zurbriggen	(Austria) Rudolf Nierlich	(Austria) Hans Enn
635	3	6 December 1988	(Italy) Sestriere	SL _{195}	(Luxembourg) Marc Girardelli	(Sweden) Jonas Nilsson	(Switzerland) Paul Accola
636	4	9 December 1988	(Italy) Val Gardena	DH _{188}	(Switzerland) Peter Müller	(Austria) Armin Assinger	(Canada) Rob Boyd
637	5	10 December 1988	(Italy) Val Gardena	DH _{189}	(Austria) Helmut Höflehner	(Austria) Patrick Ortlieb	(Switzerland) Peter Müller
638	6	11 December 1988	(Italy) Madonna di Campiglio	SL _{196}	(Italy) Alberto Tomba	(Luxembourg) Marc Girardelli	(Austria) Michael Tritscher
639	7	17 December 1988	(Socialist Federal Republic of Yugoslavia) Kranjska Gora	SL _{197}	(Luxembourg) Marc Girardelli	(West Germany) Armin Bittner	(Italy) Alberto Tomba
640	8	21 December 1988	(Austria) St. Anton	SL _{198}	(West Germany) Armin Bittner	(Austria) Bernhard Gstrein	(Switzerland) Pirmin Zurbriggen
641	9	22 December 1988	(Austria) St. Anton	DH _{190}	(Austria) Helmut Höflehner	(Switzerland) Pirmin Zurbriggen	(Austria) Leonhard Stock
642	10	22 December 1988	(Austria) St. Anton	KB _{054}	(Switzerland) Pirmin Zurbriggen	(West Germany) Markus Wasmeier	(Austria) Hubert Strolz
643	11	6 January 1989	(Switzerland) Laax	DH _{191}	(Austria) Leonhard Stock	(Austria) Peter Wirnsberger	(Austria) Helmut Höflehner
644	12	8 January 1989	(Switzerland) Laax	SG _{028}	(Switzerland) Martin Hangl	(Austria) Hans Enn	(Austria) Helmut Mayer
645	13	10 January 1989	(Austria) Kirchberg	GS _{173}	(Austria) Rudolf Nierlich	(Switzerland) Pirmin Zurbriggen	(Italy) Alberto Tomba
646	14	13 January 1989	(Austria) Kitzbühel	DH _{192}	(Luxembourg) Marc Girardelli	(Italy) Michael Mair	(Austria) Roman Rupp
647	15	14 January 1989	(Austria) Kitzbühel	DH _{193}	(Switzerland) Daniel Mahrer	(Luxembourg) Marc Girardelli	(Austria) Peter Wirnsberger
648	16	15 January 1989	(Austria) Kitzbühel	SL _{199}	(West Germany) Armin Bittner	(Italy) Alberto Tomba	(Austria) Rudolf Nierlich
649	17	15 January 1989	(Austria) Kitzbühel	KB _{055}	(Luxembourg) Marc Girardelli	(Switzerland) Paul Accola	(Italy) Michael Mair
650	18	17 January 1989	(Switzerland) Adelboden	GS _{174}	(Luxembourg) Marc Girardelli	(Norway) Ole Kristian Furuseth	(Italy) Alberto Tomba
651	19	20 January 1989	(Switzerland) Wengen	DH _{194}	(Luxembourg) Marc Girardelli	(West Germany) Markus Wasmeier	(Switzerland) Daniel Mahrer
652	20	21 January 1989	(Switzerland) Wengen	DH _{195}	(Luxembourg) Marc Girardelli	(Switzerland) Pirmin Zurbriggen	(Switzerland) Daniel Mahrer
653	21	22 January 1989	(Switzerland) Wengen	SL _{200}	(Austria) Rudolf Nierlich	(Italy) Alberto Tomba	(Austria) Hubert Strolz
654	22	22 January 1989	(Switzerland) Wengen	KB _{056}	(Luxembourg) Marc Girardelli	(Switzerland) Pirmin Zurbriggen	(West Germany) Markus Wasmeier
1989 World Championships (2–12 February)
655	23	17 February 1989	(United States) Aspen	DH _{196}	(Switzerland) Karl Alpiger	(Luxembourg) Marc Girardelli	(Switzerland) Daniel Mahrer
656	24	18 February 1989	(United States) Aspen	SG _{029}	(Sweden) Lars-Börje Eriksson	(West Germany) Markus Wasmeier	(Austria) Helmut Mayer
657	25	19 February 1989	(United States) Aspen	GS _{175}	(Sweden) Ingemar Stenmark	(Luxembourg) Marc Girardelli	(Sweden) Lars-Börje Eriksson
658	26	25 February 1989	(Canada) Whistler	DH _{197}	(Canada) Rob Boyd	(Switzerland) Daniel Mahrer	(Switzerland) Pirmin Zurbriggen
659	27	26 February 1989	(Canada) Whistler	SG _{030}	(Luxembourg) Marc Girardelli	(Sweden) Lars-Börje Eriksson	(Switzerland) Pirmin Zurbriggen
660	28	3 March 1989	(Japan) Furano	GS _{176}	(Austria) Rudolf Nierlich	(Norway) Ole Kristian Furuseth	(Switzerland) Pirmin Zurbriggen
661	29	5 March 1989	(Japan) Furano	SL _{201}	(Norway) Ole Kristian Furuseth	(Italy) Alberto Tomba	(Sweden) Jonas Nilsson
662	30	9 March 1989	(Japan) Shiga Kogen	GS _{177}	(Norway) Ole Kristian Furuseth	(Austria) Hubert Strolz	(Sweden) Johan Wallner
663	31	10 March 1989	(Japan) Shiga Kogen	SL _{202}	(Austria) Rudolf Nierlich	(Norway) Ole Kristian Furuseth	(West Germany) Armin Bittner
Nations Cup		11 March 1989	(Japan) Shiga Kogen	PS _{ncr}	(Austria) Bernhard Gstrein	(Switzerland) Pirmin Zurbriggen	(Austria) Rudolf Nierlich

=== Ladies ===
Event Key: DH – Downhill, SL – Slalom, GS – Giant Slalom, SG – Super Giant Slalom, KB – Combined, PS – Parallel Slalom (Nations Cup ranking only)
Race	Season	Date	Place	Type	Winner	Second	Third
584	1	26 November 1988	(Austria) Schladming	SG _{023}	(France) Carole Merle	(Austria) Ulrike Maier	(Austria) Anita Wachter (West Germany) Regine Mösenlechner
585	2	28 November 1988	(France) Les Menuires	GS _{166}	(Switzerland) Vreni Schneider	(Austria) Anita Wachter	(Austria) Ulrike Maier
586	3	2 December 1988	(France) Val d'Isère	DH _{157}	(Switzerland) Michela Figini	(West Germany) Regine Mösenlechner	(West Germany) Michaela Gerg
587	4	15 December 1988	(Austria) Altenmarkt-Zauchensee	DH _{158}	(Switzerland) Maria Walliser	(Austria) Veronika Wallinger	(Switzerland) Michela Figini
588	5	16 December 1988	(Austria) Altenmarkt-Zauchensee	SL _{192}	(Switzerland) Vreni Schneider	(Socialist Federal Republic of Yugoslavia) Katjuša Pušnik	(United States) Tamara McKinney
589	6	16 December 1988	(Austria) Altenmarkt-Zauchensee	KB _{049}	(Switzerland) Vreni Schneider	(Austria) Ulrike Maier	(Austria) Petra Kronberger
590	7	18 December 1988	(Italy) Val Zoldana	GS _{167}	(Switzerland) Vreni Schneider	(Socialist Federal Republic of Yugoslavia) Mateja Svet	(Austria) Anita Wachter
591	8	20 December 1988	(Italy) Courmayeur	SL _{193}	(Switzerland) Vreni Schneider	(Spain) Blanca Fernández Ochoa	(Austria) Ingrid Salvenmoser
592	9	3 January 1989	(Socialist Federal Republic of Yugoslavia) Maribor	SL _{194}	(Switzerland) Vreni Schneider	(Austria) Monika Maierhofer	(United States) Tamara McKinney
593	10	6 January 1989	(Austria) Schwarzenberg	GS _{168}	(Switzerland) Vreni Schneider	(Austria) Ulrike Maier	(Switzerland) Maria Walliser
594	11	7 January 1989	(Austria) Schwarzenberg	GS _{169}	(Switzerland) Vreni Schneider	(Austria) Ulrike Maier	(France) Carole Merle
595	12	8 January 1989	(Austria) Mellau	SL _{195}	(Switzerland) Vreni Schneider	(Socialist Federal Republic of Yugoslavia) Mateja Svet	(France) Patricia Chauvet
596	13	12 January 1989	(Switzerland) Grindelwald	DH _{159}	(Switzerland) Michela Figini	(Switzerland) Beatrice Gafner	(France) Carole Merle
597	14	13 January 1989	(Switzerland) Grindelwald	DH _{160}	(Switzerland) Michela Figini	(France) Carole Merle	(Switzerland) Maria Walliser
598	15	14 January 1989	(Switzerland) Grindelwald	SG _{024}	(France) Carole Merle	(Austria) Sigrid Wolf	(Switzerland) Maria Walliser
599	16	15 January 1989	(Switzerland) Grindelwald	SL _{196}	(Switzerland) Vreni Schneider	(United States) Tamara McKinney	(Austria) Monika Maierhofer
600	17	15 January 1989	(Switzerland) Grindelwald	KB _{050}	(Switzerland) Brigitte Oertli	(Canada) Karen Percy	(Switzerland) Michela Figini
601	18	19 January 1989	(France) Tignes	DH _{161}	(Switzerland) Maria Walliser	(France) Carole Merle	(West Germany) Michaela Gerg
602	19	20 January 1989	(France) Tignes	SG _{025}	(France) Carole Merle	(Austria) Anita Wachter	(Austria) Sigrid Wolf
603	20	21 January 1989	(France) Tignes	GS _{170}	(Switzerland) Vreni Schneider	(France) Carole Merle	(Switzerland) Maria Walliser
1989 World Championships (2–12 February)
604	21	18 February 1989	(Canada) Lake Louise	DH _{162}	(Switzerland) Michela Figini	(Switzerland) Maria Walliser	(West Germany) Michaela Gerg
605	22	19 February 1989	(Canada) Lake Louise	DH _{163}	(Switzerland) Michela Figini	(Switzerland) Maria Walliser	(West Germany) Michaela Gerg
606	23	24 February 1989	(United States) Steamboat Springs	DH _{164}	(Switzerland) Michela Figini	(Switzerland) Maria Walliser	(Switzerland) Chantal Bournissen
607	24	25 February 1989	(United States) Steamboat Springs	SG _{026}	(Austria) Sigrid Wolf	(Austria) Anita Wachter	(Switzerland) Michela Figini
608	25	3 March 1989	(Japan) Furano	SL _{197}	(Switzerland) Vreni Schneider	(Socialist Federal Republic of Yugoslavia) Veronika Šarec	(United States) Tamara McKinney
609	26	4 March 1989	(Japan) Furano	GS _{171}	(Switzerland) Maria Walliser	(Socialist Federal Republic of Yugoslavia) Mateja Svet	(Switzerland) Vreni Schneider
610	27	8 March 1989	(Japan) Shiga Kogen	GS _{172}	(Switzerland) Vreni Schneider	(Socialist Federal Republic of Yugoslavia) Mateja Svet	(West Germany) Christina Meier
611	28	10 March 1989	(Japan) Shiga Kogen	SL _{198}	(Switzerland) Vreni Schneider	(Austria) Monika Maierhofer	(Socialist Federal Republic of Yugoslavia) Veronika Šarec
Nations Cup		11 March 1989	(Japan) Shiga Kogen	PS _{ncr}	(Switzerland) Chantal Bournissen	(Germany) Michaela Gerg-Leitner	(United States) Tamara McKinney

== Men ==
=== Overall ===
see complete table

In Men's Overall World Cup 1988/89 all results count. The parallel slalom did not count for the Overall World Cup. Marc Girardelli won his third Overall World Cup.

Place	Name	Country	Total	DH	SG	GS	SL	KB
1	Marc Girardelli	Luxembourg	407	139	46	66	106	50
2	Pirmin Zurbriggen	Switzerland	309	94	62	82	26	45
3	Alberto Tomba	Italy	189	0	37	40	112	0
4	Ole Kristian Furuseth	Norway	188	0	0	82	106	0
5	Markus Wasmeier	West Germany	166	67	43	9	0	47
6	Rudolf Nierlich	Austria	144	0	0	79	65	0
7	Armin Bittner	West Germany	127	0	0	10	117	0
8	Helmut Höflehner	Austria	126	112	14	0	0	0
9	Daniel Mahrer	Switzerland	114	102	2	0	0	10
10	Hubert Strolz	Austria	112	0	18	46	33	15
11	Lars-Börje Eriksson	Sweden	102	2	51	38	0	11
12	Peter Müller	Switzerland	100	79	6	0	0	15
13	Michael Mair	Italy	89	74	0	0	0	15
	Peter Wirnsberger	Austria	89	89	0	0	0	0
15	Martin Hangl	Switzerland	87	0	47	40	0	0
16	Franck Piccard	France	82	21	49	6	0	6
17	Ingemar Stenmark	Sweden	79	0	0	67	12	0
18	Leonhard Stock	Austria	76	57	19	0	0	0
19	Helmut Mayer	Austria	74	0	35	39	0	0
20	Paul Accola	Switzerland	72	0	0	0	28	44

=== Downhill ===
see complete table

In Men's Downhill World Cup 1988/89 all results count.

Place	Name	Country	Total	4	5	9	11	14	15	19	20	23	26
1	Marc Girardelli	Luxembourg	139	-	-	12	7	25	20	25	25	20	5
2	Helmut Höflehner	Austria	112	4	25	25	15	-	6	4	10	11	12
3	Daniel Mahrer	Switzerland	102	-	-	3	-	9	25	15	15	15	20
4	Pirmin Zurbriggen	Switzerland	94	12	-	20	6	-	12	8	20	1	15
5	Peter Wirnsberger	Austria	89	7	-	10	20	10	15	11	-	9	7
6	Peter Müller	Switzerland	79	25	15	-	-	12	11	-	-	6	10
7	Michael Mair	Italy	74	3	6	11	12	20	8	7	4	3	-
8	Rob Boyd	Canada	68	15	-	-	-	-	10	9	9	-	25
9	Markus Wasmeier	West Germany	67	9	-	9	10	-	-	20	11	8	-
10	Karl Alpiger	Switzerland	65	-	10	-	1	11	7	5	5	25	1
11	Leonhard Stock	Austria	57	5	-	15	25	5	3	-	-	4	-

=== Super-G ===
see complete table

In Men's Super-G World Cup 1988/89 all four results count. Pirmin Zurbriggen won his third Super-G World Cup in a row. All events were won by a different racer.

Place	Name	Country	Total	1	12	24	27
1	Pirmin Zurbriggen	Switzerland	62	25	12	10	15
2	Lars-Börje Eriksson	Sweden	51	-	6	25	20
3	Franck Piccard	France	49	20	9	11	9
4	Martin Hangl	Switzerland	47	3	25	9	10
5	Marc Girardelli	Luxembourg	46	7	2	12	25
6	Markus Wasmeier	West Germany	43	11	-	20	12
7	Alberto Tomba	Italy	37	12	11	7	7
8	Helmut Mayer	Austria	35	-	15	15	5
9	Hans Enn	Austria	26	6	20	-	-
10	Luc Alphand	France	25	9	-	5	11

=== Giant Slalom ===
see complete table

In Men's Giant Slalom World Cup 1988/89 all results count. Ole Kristian Furuseth won Giant Slalom World Cup (20 points two times).

Place	Name	Country	Total	2	13	18	25	28	30
1	Ole Kristian Furuseth	Norway	82	-	10	20	7	20	25
2	Pirmin Zurbriggen	Switzerland	82	25	20	11	-	15	11
3	Rudolf Nierlich	Austria	79	20	25	-	-	25	9
4	Ingemar Stenmark	Sweden	67	9	2	10	25	9	12
5	Marc Girardelli	Luxembourg	66	3	11	25	20	7	-
6	Hubert Strolz	Austria	46	8	9	7	-	2	20
7	Alberto Tomba	Italy	40	-	15	15	10	-	-
8	Martin Hangl	Switzerland	40	-	8	9	11	6	6
9	Helmut Mayer	Austria	39	12	5	12	-	10	-
10	Lars-Börje Eriksson	Sweden	38	-	4	-	15	12	7

=== Slalom ===
see complete table

In Men's Slalom World Cup 1988/89 all results count.

Place	Name	Country	Total	3	6	7	8	16	21	29	31
1	Armin Bittner	West Germany	117	12	12	20	25	25	-	8	15
2	Alberto Tomba	Italy	112	-	25	15	-	20	20	20	12
3	Marc Girardelli	Luxembourg	106	25	20	25	-	12	12	12	-
4	Ole Kristian Furuseth	Norway	106	7	8	12	12	11	11	25	20
5	Jonas Nilsson	Sweden	70	20	-	7	8	-	10	15	10
6	Rudolf Nierlich	Austria	65	-	-	-	-	15	25	-	25
7	Michael Tritscher	Austria	54	8	15	4	9	-	5	7	6
8	Bernhard Gstrein	Austria	51	11	11	-	20	-	-	9	-
9	Felix McGrath	United States	43	9	-	8	11	-	-	11	4
10	Paul Frommelt	Liechtenstein	42	-	10	1	-	10	9	5	7

=== Combined ===
see complete table

In Men's Combined World Cup 1988/89 all three results count.

Place	Name	Country	Total	10	17	22
1	Marc Girardelli	Luxembourg	50	-	25	25
2	Markus Wasmeier	West Germany	47	20	12	15
3	Pirmin Zurbriggen	Switzerland	45	25	-	20
4	Paul Accola	Switzerland	44	12	20	12
5	Gustav Oehrli	Switzerland	22	3	8	11
6	Atle Skårdal	Norway	20	7	5	8
7	Jean-Luc Crétier	France	19	9	10	-
8	Hubert Strolz	Austria	15	15	-	-
	Michael Mair	Italy	15	-	15	-
10	Peter Müller	Switzerland	15	4	11	-

== Ladies ==
=== Overall ===
see complete table

In Women's Overall World Cup 1988/89 all results count. The parallel slalom did not count for the Overall World Cup.

Place	Name	Country	Total	DH	SG	GS	SL	KB
1	Vreni Schneider	Switzerland	376	0	11	165	175	25
2	Maria Walliser	Switzerland	261	142	27	87	0	5
3	Michela Figini	Switzerland	248	176	29	18	0	25
4	Carole Merle	France	206	67	75	55	0	9
5	Anita Wachter	Austria	157	0	56	59	42	0
6	Mateja Svet	Yugoslavia	154	0	0	106	40	8
7	Ulrike Maier	Austria	150	0	33	60	26	31
8	Michaela Gerg	West Germany	148	91	23	34	0	0
9	Karen Percy	Canada	127	53	13	24	17	20
10	Sigrid Wolf	Austria	119	28	71	20	0	0
11	Tamara McKinney	United States	116	0	0	27	77	12
12	Heidi Zurbriggen	Switzerland	86	41	18	12	0	15
13	Monika Maierhofer	Austria	85	0	0	0	85	0
14	Regine Mösenlechner	West Germany	84	45	27	12	0	0
15	Veronika Wallinger	Austria	78	65	13	0	0	0
16	Ingrid Salvenmoser	Austria	66	0	0	31	35	0
17	Veronika Šarec	Yugoslavia	62	0	0	1	61	0
18	Blanca Fernández Ochoa	Spain	61	0	4	17	40	0
19	Brigitte Oertli	Switzerland	60	9	8	0	7	36
20	Barbara Sadleder	Austria	58	41	9	0	0	8

=== Downhill ===
see complete table

In Women's Downhill World Cup 1988/89 all results count. Michela Figini won her fourth Downhill World Cup (the last three in a row). She was able to win six races and only her teammate Maria Walliser was able to take two wins. The second consecutive season that saw only wins by Swiss athletes!

Place	Name	Country	Total	3	4	13	14	18	21	22	23
1	Michela Figini	Switzerland	176	25	15	25	25	11	25	25	25
2	Maria Walliser	Switzerland	142	5	25	12	15	25	20	20	20
3	Michaela Gerg	West Germany	91	15	4	6	9	15	15	15	12
4	Carole Merle	France	67	12	-	15	20	20	-	-	-
5	Veronika Wallinger	Austria	65	11	20	9	7	-	7	-	11
6	Chantal Bournissen	Switzerland	55	7	-	-	-	9	12	12	15
7	Karen Percy	Canada	53	10	-	5	-	6	10	12	10
8	Regine Mösenlechner	West Germany	45	20	-	4	11	10	-	-	-
9	Heidi Zurbriggen	Switzerland	41	9	-	3	6	12	11	-	-
	Barbara Sadleder	Austria	41	7	12	10	3	-	-	3	6

=== Super-G ===
see complete table

In Women's Super-G World Cup 1988/89 all four results count.

Place	Name	Country	Total	1	15	19	24
1	Carole Merle	France	75	25	25	25	-
2	Sigrid Wolf	Austria	71	11	20	15	25
3	Anita Wachter	Austria	56	15	1	20	20
4	Ulrike Maier	Austria	33	20	12	1	-
5	Michela Figini	Switzerland	29	9	5	-	15
6	Maria Walliser	Switzerland	27	-	15	12	-
	Regine Mösenlechner	West Germany	27	15	3	9	-
8	Michaela Gerg	West Germany	23	8	8	7	-
9	Catherine Quittet	France	22	-	-	11	11
10	Heidi Zurbriggen	Switzerland	18	-	2	6	10
	Cathy Chedal	France	18	4	-	10	4

=== Giant Slalom ===
see complete table

In Women's Giant Slalom World Cup 1988/89 all results count. Vreni Schneider won her third Giant Slalom World Cup by winning 6 races out of 7. Only her teammate Maria Walliser was able to win a single race.

Place	Name	Country	Total	2	7	10	11	20	26	27
1	Vreni Schneider	Switzerland	165	25	25	25	25	25	15	25
2	Mateja Svet	Yugoslavia	106	10	20	12	12	12	20	20
3	Maria Walliser	Switzerland	87	-	11	15	9	15	25	12
4	Ulrike Maier	Austria	60	15	-	20	20	5	-	-
5	Anita Wachter	Austria	59	20	15	-	-	10	6	8
6	Carole Merle	France	55	-	10	10	15	20	-	-
7	Catherine Quittet	France	35	-	1	9	3	-	12	10
8	Michaela Gerg	West Germany	34	8	-	-	8	7	-	11
9	Traudl Hächer	West Germany	32	9	-	8	6	2	7	-
10	Ingrid Salvenmoser	Austria	31	3	8	4	5	-	10	1

=== Slalom ===
see complete table

In Women's Slalom World Cup 1988/89 all results count. Vreni Schneider won all races and won the cup with maximum points. Up to now this was the last time an athlete was able to win a cup with maximum points. Together with the win in the first race next season 1989/90 Vreni Schneider was able to win nine world cup slalom races in a row!

Place	Name	Country	Total	5	8	9	12	16	25	28
1	Vreni Schneider	Switzerland	175	25	25	25	25	25	25	25
2	Monika Maierhofer	Austria	85	12	-	20	11	15	7	20
3	Tamara McKinney	United States	77	15	-	15	-	20	15	12
4	Veronika Šarec	Yugoslavia	61	2	-	-	12	12	20	15
5	Christine von Grünigen	Switzerland	48	-	10	11	10	8	9	-
6	Patricia Chauvet	France	45	11	-	-	15	9	10	-
7	Anita Wachter	Austria	42	-	12	-	8	-	11	11
8	Blanca Fernández Ochoa	Spain	40	9	20	-	-	11	-	-
	Mateja Svet	Yugoslavia	40	10	-	-	20	10	-	-
10	Katjuša Pušnik	Yugoslavia	39	20	-	10	-	7	-	2

=== Combined ===
see complete table

In Women's Combined World Cup 1988/89 both results count. Brigitte Oertli won her fourth Combined World Cup (the last three in a row).

Place	Name	Country	Total	6	17
1	Brigitte Oertli	Switzerland	36	11	25
2	Ulrike Maier	Austria	31	20	11
3	Vreni Schneider	Switzerland	25	25	-
	Michela Figini	Switzerland	25	10	15
5	Karen Percy	Canada	20	-	20
6	Petra Kronberger	Austria	19	15	4
7	Heidi Zurbriggen	Switzerland	15	5	10
8	Tamara McKinney	United States	12	12	-
	Florence Masnada	France	12	-	12
10	Ulrike Stanggassinger	West Germany	9	9	-
	Carole Merle	France	9	-	9
	Lenka Kebrlová	Czechoslovakia	9	7	2

== Nations Cup ==
=== Overall ===
Place	Country	Total	Men	Ladies
1	Switzerland	2225	928	1297
2	Austria	1967	1037	930
3	West Germany	834	433	401
4	France	609	170	439
5	Italy	414	414	0
6	Luxembourg	407	407	0
7	Sweden	366	294	72
8	Yugoslavia	335	80	255
9	Canada	276	85	191
10	Norway	256	256	0
11	United States	217	74	143
12	Liechtenstein	77	42	35
13	Spain	61	0	61
14	Czechoslovakia	39	19	20
15	Japan	38	38	0
16	Soviet Union	33	0	33
17	United Kingdom	8	5	3
18	Mexico	2	2	0

=== Men ===
All points were shown. But without parallel slalom, because result ? (Also possible, that the parallel slaloms were only show-events.)

Place	Country	Total	DH	SG	GS	SL	KB	Racers	Wins
1	Austria	1037	404	132	195	270	36	21	7
2	Switzerland	928	447	128	166	43	144	15	7
3	West Germany	433	131	58	29	143	72	15	2
4	Italy	414	105	53	67	164	25	16	1
5	Luxembourg	407	139	46	66	106	50	1	9
6	Sweden	294	2	54	137	84	17	7	2
7	Norway	256	48	0	82	106	20	3	2
8	France	170	21	74	23	18	34	9	0
9	Canada	85	81	1	0	0	3	4	1
10	Yugoslavia	80	0	8	50	22	0	5	0
11	United States	74	0	0	13	55	6	5	0
12	Liechtenstein	42	0	0	0	42	0	1	0
13	Japan	38	0	0	0	38	0	1	0
14	Czechoslovakia	19	0	0	0	0	19	2	0
15	United Kingdom	5	5	0	0	0	0	1	0
16	Mexico	2	0	0	0	0	2	1	0

=== Ladies ===
All points were shown. But without parallel slalom, because result ? (Also possible, that the parallel slaloms were only show-events.) Only three teams were able to win races.

Place	Country	Total	DH	SG	GS	SL	KB	Racers	Wins
1	Switzerland	1297	493	110	314	265	115	18	24
2	Austria	930	219	212	204	236	59	17	1
3	France	439	88	123	115	91	22	11	3
4	West Germany	401	180	71	119	16	15	9	0
5	Yugoslavia	255	0	0	107	140	8	3	0
6	Canada	191	97	22	24	22	26	6	0
7	United States	143	12	2	30	87	12	7	0
8	Sweden	72	0	0	18	54	0	3	0
9	Spain	61	0	4	17	40	0	1	0
10	Liechtenstein	35	0	0	22	13	0	1	0
11	Soviet Union	33	21	12	0	0	0	2	0
12	Czechoslovakia	20	0	0	0	1	19	3	0
13	United Kingdom	3	0	0	0	3	0	1	0
