= 1987–88 FIS Alpine Ski World Cup =

International sports competition

FIS Alpine Ski World Cup 1987/88
Discipline	Men	Women
Overall	(Switzerland) Pirmin Zurbriggen	(Switzerland) Michela Figini
Downhill	(Switzerland) Pirmin Zurbriggen	(Switzerland) Michela Figini
Super G	(Switzerland) Pirmin Zurbriggen	(Switzerland) Michela Figini
Giant slalom	(Italy) Alberto Tomba	(Socialist Federal Republic of Yugoslavia) Mateja Svet
Slalom	(Italy) Alberto Tomba	(Austria) Roswitha Steiner
Nations Cup	Austria	Switzerland
- Nations Cup overall: Austria

Competition
Locations	16	14
Individual	30	28

The 22nd World Cup season began in November 1987 in Italy and concluded in March 1988 in Austria. The overall champions were Pirmin Zurbriggen and Michela Figini, both of Switzerland. Zurbriggen won his third overall title; Figini her second.

Beginning this year, the limitation on the number of events that would count for overall and discipline championships, which had been present since the founding of the World Cup, was eliminated. The intent was to eliminate ties for discipline titles, although the first tiebreaker (number of wins) was retained; additionally, this would permit skiers to accumulate more points toward the overall title from their strongest disciplines.

A break in the schedule in February was for the 1988 Winter Olympics in Calgary, Alberta, Canada. The alpine events were held at the new Nakiska ski area. As the Olympics was in the process of eliminating its prior ban on professionals being allowed to compete, Swedish star Ingemar Stenmark returned to the Olympics after having been banned in 1984 (although Stenmark still received his payments from sponsors at his Monaco address, not through the Swedish federation). Accordingly, from this point forward, skiers were able to turn professional and still continue to compete in the World Cup, which caused the demise of the former professional skiing circuit within a decade.

== Calendar ==
=== Men ===
Event key: DH – Downhill, SL – Slalom, GS – Giant slalom, SG – Super giant slalom, KB – Combined, PS – Parallel slalom (Nations Cup ranking only)
Race	Season	Date	Place	Type	Winner	Second	Third
603	1	27 November 1987	(Italy) Sestriere	SL _{187}	(Italy) Alberto Tomba	(Sweden) Jonas Nilsson	(Austria) Günther Mader
604	2	29 November 1987	(Italy) Sestriere	GS _{166}	(Italy) Alberto Tomba	(Sweden) Ingemar Stenmark	(Switzerland) Joël Gaspoz
605	3	7 December 1987	(France) Val d'Isère	DH _{178}	(Switzerland) Daniel Mahrer	(Switzerland) Pirmin Zurbriggen	(Italy) Michael Mair
606	4	12 December 1987	(Italy) Val Gardena	DH _{179}	(Canada) Rob Boyd	(Switzerland) Pirmin Zurbriggen	(Canada) Brian Stemmle
607	5	13 December 1987	(Italy) Alta Badia	GS _{167}	(Italy) Alberto Tomba	(Austria) Rudolf Nierlich	(Switzerland) Joël Gaspoz (Switzerland) Hans Pieren
608	6	16 December 1987	(Italy) Madonna di Campiglio	SL _{188}	(Italy) Alberto Tomba	(Austria) Rudolf Nierlich	(Socialist Federal Republic of Yugoslavia) Bojan Križaj
609	7	19 December 1987	(Socialist Federal Republic of Yugoslavia) Kranjska Gora	GS _{168}	(Austria) Helmut Mayer	(Switzerland) Pirmin Zurbriggen	(Austria) Hubert Strolz
610	8	20 December 1987	(Socialist Federal Republic of Yugoslavia) Kranjska Gora	SL _{189}	(Italy) Alberto Tomba	(Italy) Richard Pramotton	(Austria) Günther Mader
Nations Cup		22 December 1987	(Italy) Bormio	PS _{ncr}	(Switzerland) Pirmin Zurbriggen	(Switzerland) Joël Gaspoz	(Switzerland) Martin Hangl
611	9	9 January 1988	(France) Val d'Isère	DH _{180}	(Switzerland) Pirmin Zurbriggen	(Austria) Anton Steiner	(Luxembourg) Marc Girardelli
612	10	10 January 1988	(France) Val d'Isère	SG _{023}	(West Germany) Markus Wasmeier	(France) Franck Piccard	(Switzerland) Pirmin Zurbriggen
613	11	12 January 1988	(Austria) Lienz	SL _{190}	(Switzerland) Bernhard Gstrein	(Italy) Alberto Tomba	(Sweden) Jonas Nilsson
614	12	16 January 1988	(Austria) Bad Kleinkirchheim	DH _{181}	(Switzerland) Peter Müller	(Switzerland) Pirmin Zurbriggen	(France) Franck Piccard
615	13	17 January 1988	(Austria) Bad Kleinkirchheim	SL _{191}	(Italy) Alberto Tomba	(Austria) Thomas Stangassinger	(Austria) Bernhard Gstrein
616	14	17 January 1988	(Austria) Bad Kleinkirchheim	KB _{052}	(Austria) Hubert Strolz	(West Germany) Markus Wasmeier	(France) Franck Piccard
617	15	19 January 1988	(Switzerland) Saas-Fee	GS _{169}	(Italy) Alberto Tomba	(Austria) Günther Mader	(Austria) Helmut Mayer
618	16	23 January 1988	(Switzerland) Leukerbad	DH _{182}	(Italy) Michael Mair	(Italy) Giorgio Piantanida	(Italy) Werner Perathoner
619	17	24 January 1988	(Switzerland) Leukerbad	DH _{183}	(Switzerland) Daniel Mahrer	(Switzerland) Franz Heinzer	(Italy) Igor Cigolla
620	18	25 January 1988	(Switzerland) Leukerbad	SG _{024}	(Canada) Felix Belczyk	(Switzerland) Pirmin Zurbriggen	(Italy) Heinz Holzer
621	19	29 January 1988	(Austria) Schladming	DH _{184}	(Switzerland) Pirmin Zurbriggen	(Switzerland) Franz Heinzer	(West Germany) Peter Dürr
622	20	30 January 1988	(Austria) Schladming	GS _{170}	(Austria) Rudolf Nierlich	(Austria) Hubert Strolz	(Austria) Helmut Mayer
1988 Winter Olympics (15–27 February)
623	21	11 March 1988	(United States) Beaver Creek	DH _{185}	(Switzerland) Franz Heinzer	(France) Christophe Ple	(Luxembourg) Marc Girardelli
624	22	12 March 1988	(United States) Beaver Creek	DH _{186}	(Switzerland) Peter Müller	(Canada) Donald Stevens	(Luxembourg) Marc Girardelli
625	23	13 March 1988	(United States) Beaver Creek	SG _{025}	(France) Franck Piccard	(West Germany) Markus Wasmeier	(Luxembourg) Marc Girardelli
626	24	19 March 1988	(Sweden) Åre	SL _{192}	(Italy) Alberto Tomba	(United States) Felix McGrath	(Austria) Günther Mader
627	25	20 March 1988	(Sweden) Åre	DH _{187}	(Switzerland) Karl Alpiger	(Italy) Danilo Sbardellotto	(Switzerland) Franz Heinzer
628	26	20 March 1988	(Sweden) Åre	KB _{053}	(Austria) Günther Mader	(Switzerland) Pirmin Zurbriggen	(Austria) Hubert Strolz
629	27	22 March 1988	(Norway) Oppdal	SL _{193}	(Italy) Alberto Tomba	(Japan) Tetsuya Okabe	(Liechtenstein) Paul Frommelt
630	28	24 March 1988	(Austria) Saalbach	SG _{026}	(Switzerland) Martin Hangl	(Austria) Hubert Strolz	(Luxembourg) Marc Girardelli
631	29	25 March 1988	(Austria) Saalbach	GS _{171}	(Switzerland) Martin Hangl	(Luxembourg) Marc Girardelli	(Switzerland) Pirmin Zurbriggen
632	30	26 March 1988	(Austria) Saalbach	SL _{194}	(Liechtenstein) Paul Frommelt	(West Germany) Armin Bittner	(Austria) Hubert Strolz
Nations Cup		27 March 1988	(Austria) Saalbach	PS _{ncr}	(Italy) Alberto Tomba	(Switzerland) Pirmin Zurbriggen	(Austria) Helmut Mayer

=== Ladies ===
Event key: DH – Downhill, SL – Slalom, GS – Giant slalom, SG – Super giant slalom, KB – Combined, PS – Parallel slalom (Nations Cup ranking only)
Race	Season	Date	Place	Type	Winner	Second	Third
556	1	26 November 1987	(Italy) Sestriere	SL _{184}	(Spain) Blanca Fernández Ochoa	(Socialist Federal Republic of Yugoslavia) Mateja Svet	(Switzerland) Vreni Schneider
557	2	28 November 1987	(Italy) Sestriere	SG _{019}	(Austria) Sigrid Wolf	(Socialist Federal Republic of Yugoslavia) Mateja Svet	(Austria) Sylvia Eder
558	3	30 November 1987	(Italy) Courmayeur	SL _{185}	(Austria) Anita Wachter	(Austria) Ida Ladstätter	(Austria) Ulrike Maier
559	4	4 December 1987	(France) Val d'Isère	DH _{149}	(Switzerland) Maria Walliser	(Switzerland) Michela Figini	(Switzerland) Zoë Haas
560	5	5 December 1987	(France) Val d'Isère	DH _{150}	(Switzerland) Chantal Bournissen	(West Germany) Marina Kiehl	(West Germany) Ulrike Stanggassinger
561	6	11 December 1987	(Switzerland) Leukerbad	DH _{151}	(Switzerland) Michela Figini	(Austria) Sigrid Wolf	(Switzerland) Brigitte Oertli
562	7	12 December 1987	(Switzerland) Leukerbad	SG _{020}	(Switzerland) Michela Figini	(Austria) Sylvia Eder	(West Germany) Regine Mösenlechner
563	8	13 December 1987	(Switzerland) Leukerbad	SL _{186}	(Austria) Ida Ladstätter	(Sweden) Camilla Nilsson	(Spain) Blanca Fernández Ochoa
564	9	13 December 1987	(Switzerland) Leukerbad	KB _{047}	(Switzerland) Brigitte Oertli	(Austria) Anita Wachter	(Canada) Karen Percy
565	10	19 December 1987	(Italy) Piancavallo	SL _{187}	(West Germany) Christa Kinshofer	(France) Patricia Chauvet	(Socialist Federal Republic of Yugoslavia) Veronika Šarec
566	11	20 December 1987	(Italy) Piancavallo	GS _{160}	(France) Catherine Quittet	(Switzerland) Vreni Schneider	(Switzerland) Michela Figini
Nations Cup		22 December 1987	(Italy) Bormio	PS _{ncr}	(Switzerland) Brigitte Oertli	(Switzerland) Corinne Schmidhauser	(Switzerland) Michela Figini
567	12	5 January 1988	(France) Tignes	GS _{161}	(Switzerland) Vreni Schneider	(France) Catherine Quittet	(France) Carole Merle
568	13	6 January 1988	(France) Tignes	GS _{162}	(France) Carole Merle	(Switzerland) Maria Walliser	(Spain) Blanca Fernández Ochoa
569	14	9 January 1988	(Austria) Lech am Arlberg	SG _{021}	(Switzerland) Zoë Haas	(France) Catherine Quittet	(Switzerland) Michela Figini
570	15	14 January 1988	(Switzerland) Zinal	DH _{152}	(Switzerland) Michela Figini	(Canada) Karen Percy	(Austria) Petra Kronberger
571	16	16 January 1988	(Switzerland) Zinal	DH _{153}	(Switzerland) Maria Walliser	(Switzerland) Michela Figini	(Switzerland) Brigitte Oertli
572	17	18 January 1988	(Switzerland) Saas-Fee	SL _{188}	(Switzerland) Brigitte Oertli	(Switzerland) Vreni Schneider	(France) Patricia Chauvet
573	18	23 January 1988	(Austria) Bad Gastein	DH _{154}	(Switzerland) Beatrice Gafner	(Switzerland) Brigitte Oertli	(Austria) Veronika Wallinger
574	19	24 January 1988	(Austria) Bad Gastein	SL _{189}	(Switzerland) Vreni Schneider	(West Germany) Christa Kinshofer	(Switzerland) Corinne Schmidhauser
575	20	24 January 1988	(Austria) Bad Gastein	KB _{048}	(Switzerland) Brigitte Oertli	(Switzerland) Vreni Schneider	(Austria) Petra Kronberger
576	21	30 January 1988	(Socialist Federal Republic of Yugoslavia) Kranjska Gora	GS _{163}	(Socialist Federal Republic of Yugoslavia) Mateja Svet	(Switzerland) Vreni Schneider	(Spain) Blanca Fernández Ochoa (Austria) Anita Wachter
577	22	31 January 1988	(Socialist Federal Republic of Yugoslavia) Kranjska Gora	SL _{190}	(Socialist Federal Republic of Yugoslavia) Mateja Svet	(Switzerland) Vreni Schneider (Austria) Roswitha Steiner	
1988 Winter Olympics (15–27 February)
578	23	5 March 1988	(United States) Aspen	DH _{155}	(Switzerland) Brigitte Oertli	(West Germany) Regine Mösenlechner	(Switzerland) Heidi Zeller
579	24	6 March 1988	(United States) Aspen	SL _{191}	(Austria) Roswitha Steiner	(Austria) Anita Wachter	(Austria) Monika Maierhofer
580	25	7 March 1988	(United States) Aspen	GS _{164}	(West Germany) Christina Meier	(Spain) Blanca Fernández Ochoa	(Austria) Ulrike Maier
581	26	12 March 1988	(Canada) Rossland	DH _{156}	(Switzerland) Michela Figini	(Switzerland) Brigitte Oertli	(Austria) Veronika Wallinger
582	27	13 March 1988	(Canada) Rossland	SG _{022}	(Switzerland) Michela Figini	(Austria) Ulrike Maier	(Austria) Anita Wachter
583	28	23 March 1988	(Austria) Saalbach	GS _{165}	(Socialist Federal Republic of Yugoslavia) Mateja Svet	(Austria) Anita Wachter	(Austria) Ulrike Maier
Nations Cup		27 March 1988	(Austria) Saalbach	PS _{ncr}	(Germany) Christina Meier	(Austria) Ulrike Maier	(Austria) Roswitha Steiner

== Men ==
=== Overall ===
see complete table

In men's overall World Cup 1987/88 all results count. Pirmin Zurbriggen won his third Overall World Cup. The two parallel slaloms did not count for the Overall World Cup.

Place	Name	Country	Total	DH	SG	GS	SL	KB
1	Pirmin Zurbriggen	Switzerland	310	122	58	65	45	20
2	Alberto Tomba	Italy	281	0	29	82	170	0
3	Hubert Strolz	Austria	190	0	31	69	50	40
4	Günther Mader	Austria	189	2	24	57	69	37
5	Marc Girardelli	Luxembourg	142	59	38	30	15	0
6	Markus Wasmeier	West Germany	138	37	57	24	0	20
7	Franck Piccard	France	123	42	54	0	0	27
8	Franz Heinzer	Switzerland	112	94	10	0	0	8
9	Peter Müller	Switzerland	109	90	9	0	0	10
10	Michael Mair	Italy	108	108	0	0	0	0
11	Rob Boyd	Canada	100	94	0	0	0	6
12	Helmut Mayer	Austria	78	0	11	67	0	0
13	Martin Hangl	Switzerland	76	0	30	46	0	0
14	Leonhard Stock	Austria	72	42	30	0	0	0
15	Daniel Mahrer	Switzerland	68	64	4	0	0	0
	Felix McGrath	United States	68	0	0	8	53	7
17	Rudolf Nierlich	Austria	67	0	0	47	20	0
18	Bernhard Gstrein	Austria	66	0	0	17	49	0
19	Felix Belczyk	Canada	65	38	27	0	0	0
20	Christophe Plé	France	59	59	0	0	0	0

=== Downhill ===
see complete table

In men's downhill World Cup 1987/88 all results count.

Place	Name	Country	Total	3	4	10	13	17	18	20	22	23	26
1	Pirmin Zurbriggen	Switzerland	122	20	20	25	20	-	3	25	5	-	4
2	Michael Mair	Italy	108	15	11	11	4	25	8	-	12	10	12
3	Franz Heinzer	Switzerland	94	7	-	-	-	-	20	20	25	7	15
	Rob Boyd	Canada	94	11	25	-	11	7	9	-	10	11	10
5	Peter Müller	Switzerland	90	6	7	1	25	-	-	6	11	25	9
6	Daniel Mahrer	Switzerland	64	25	2	-	-	-	25	12	-	-	-
7	Marc Girardelli	Luxembourg	59	4	10	15	-	-	-	-	15	15	-
	Christophe Plé	France	59	10	-	10	-	10	-	-	20	9	-
9	Karl Alpiger	Switzerland	50	12	-	6	2	-	-	-	2	3	25
10	Danilo Sbardellotto	Italy	42	9	-	-	6	-	7	-	-	-	20
	Leonhard Stock	Austria	42	-	9	9	12	-	-	-	-	5	7
	Franck Piccard	France	42	-	-	12	15	-	-	10	-	-	5

=== Super G ===
see complete table

In men's super G World Cup 1987/88 all four results count. Pirmin Zurbriggen won the cup without a single race-win. All events were won by a different racer.

Place	Name	Country	Total	11	19	24	29
1	Pirmin Zurbriggen	Switzerland	58	15	20	12	11
2	Markus Wasmeier	West Germany	57	25	12	20	-
3	Franck Piccard	France	54	20	-	25	9
4	Marc Girardelli	Luxembourg	38	8	-	15	15
5	Hubert Strolz	Austria	31	4	-	7	20
6	Martin Hangl	Switzerland	30	5	-	-	25
	Leonhard Stock	Austria	30	10	-	10	10
8	Alberto Tomba	Italy	29	11	-	11	7
9	Felix Belczyk	Canada	27	-	25	2	-
10	Hans Enn	Austria	24	6	6	-	12
	Günther Mader	Austria	24	12	3	8	1

=== Giant slalom ===
see complete table

In men's giant slalom World Cup 1987/88 all results count.

Place	Name	Country	Total	2	5	7	16	21	30
1	Alberto Tomba	Italy	82	25	25	-	25	7	-
2	Hubert Strolz	Austria	69	-	11	15	11	20	12
3	Helmut Mayer	Austria	67	12	-	25	15	15	-
4	Pirmin Zurbriggen	Switzerland	65	-	10	20	12	8	15
5	Günther Mader	Austria	57	-	5	10	20	12	10
6	Hans Pieren	Switzerland	48	6	15	12	-	11	4
7	Rudolf Nierlich	Austria	47	-	20	-	2	25	-
8	Martin Hangl	Switzerland	46	5	-	11	5	-	25
9	Ingemar Stenmark	Sweden	37	20	-	6	-	-	11
10	Frank Wörndl	West Germany	36	10	7	8	1	4	6

=== Slalom ===
see complete table

In men's slalom World Cup 1987/88 all results count. Alberto Tomba was able to win six races out of eight.

Place	Name	Country	Total	1	6	8	12	14	25	28	31
1	Alberto Tomba	Italy	170	25	25	25	20	25	25	25	-
2	Günther Mader	Austria	69	15	-	15	7	-	15	11	6
3	Felix McGrath	United States	53	-	-	4	9	9	20	-	11
4	Paul Frommelt	Liechtenstein	52	12	-	-	-	-	-	15	25
	Armin Bittner	West Germany	52	-	12	-	12	-	-	8	20
6	Hubert Strolz	Austria	50	-	8	8	-	11	8	-	15
7	Bernhard Gstrein	Austria	49	-	-	-	25	15	-	-	9
	Jonas Nilsson	Sweden	49	20	-	-	15	-	-	7	7
9	Pirmin Zurbriggen	Switzerland	45	9	-	12	-	-	-	12	12
10	Grega Benedik	Yugoslavia	44	5	5	9	-	6	9	10	-

=== Combined ===
see complete table

In men's combined World Cup 1987/88 both results count.

Place	Name	Country	Total	15	27
1	Hubert Strolz	Austria	40	25	15
2	Günther Mader	Austria	37	12	25
3	Franck Piccard	France	27	15	12
4	Markus Wasmeier	West Germany	20	20	-
	Pirmin Zurbriggen	Switzerland	20	-	20
6	Peter Jurko	Czechoslovakia	11	11	-
	Lars-Göran Halvarsson	Sweden	11	-	11
	Denis Rey	France	11	8	3
9	Ole Kristian Furuseth	Norway	10	10	-
	Peter Müller	Switzerland	10	-	10

== Ladies ==
=== Overall ===
see complete table

In women's overall World Cup 1987/88 all results count. The two parallel slaloms did not count for the Overall World Cup.

Place	Name	Country	Total	DH	SG	GS	SL	KB
1	Michela Figini	Switzerland	244	143	65	29	0	7
2	Brigitte Oertli	Switzerland	226	119	12	4	41	50
3	Anita Wachter	Austria	211	8	22	74	75	32
4	Blanca Fernández Ochoa	Spain	190	0	40	66	73	11
5	Vreni Schneider	Switzerland	185	0	9	76	80	20
6	Mateja Svet	Yugoslavia	167	0	24	87	56	0
7	Maria Walliser	Switzerland	143	82	5	40	0	16
8	Ulrike Maier	Austria	132	0	34	39	49	10
9	Catherine Quittet	France	116	12	26	78	0	0
10	Sigrid Wolf	Austria	110	55	36	19	0	0
11	Karen Percy	Canada	107	59	15	0	9	24
12	Christa Kinshofer	West Germany	105	0	16	22	67	0
13	Roswitha Steiner	Austria	87	0	0	0	87	0
14	Michaela Gerg	West Germany	84	24	32	16	0	12
15	Regine Mösenlechner	West Germany	80	38	40	0	0	2
16	Corinne Schmidhauser	Switzerland	77	0	0	11	66	0
17	Petra Kronberger	Austria	76	37	15	0	0	24
18	Marina Kiehl	West Germany	70	40	10	20	0	0
19	Carole Merle	France	69	10	0	59	0	0
20	Camilla Nilsson	Sweden	66	0	0	16	50	0

=== Downhill ===
see complete table

In women's downhill World Cup 1987/88 all results count. Michela Figini won her third Downhill World Cup. Swiss athletes were able to win all races.

Place	Name	Country	Total	4	5	6	16	17	19	24	27
1	Michela Figini	Switzerland	143	20	7	25	25	20	12	9	25
2	Brigitte Oertli	Switzerland	119	11	3	15	10	15	20	25	20
3	Maria Walliser	Switzerland	82	25	-	10	12	25	10	-	-
4	Veronika Wallinger	Austria	59	-	-	3	3	12	15	11	15
	Karen Percy	Canada	59	7	-	8	20	6	7	-	11
6	Sigrid Wolf	Austria	55	3	9	20	11	7	-	-	5
7	Beatrice Gafner	Switzerland	43	-	-	-	9	9	25	-	-
8	Marina Kiehl	West Germany	40	10	20	-	-	-	10	-	-
9	Regine Mösenlechner	West Germany	38	5	5	5	-	-	-	20	3
10	Petra Kronberger	Austria	37	-	-	1	15	-	11	-	10
	Kerrin Lee	Canada	37	2	8	-	-	3	5	10	9
	Laurie Graham	Canada	37	12	2	11	-	10	-	-	2
13	Katrin Gutensohn	Austria	36	-	-	-	4	11	1	8	12
	Chantal Bournissen	Switzerland	36	6	25	-	-	1	3	-	1

=== Super G ===
see complete table

In women's super G World Cup 1987/88 all four results count.

Place	Name	Country	Total	2	7	15	28
1	Michela Figini	Switzerland	65	-	25	15	25
2	Sylvia Eder	Austria	45	15	20	-	10
3	Regine Mösenlechner	West Germany	40	4	15	9	12
	Blanca Fernández Ochoa	Spain	40	10	11	11	8
5	Sigrid Wolf	Austria	36	25	-	-	11
6	Ulrike Maier	Austria	34	-	4	10	20
7	Michaela Gerg	West Germany	32	12	8	12	-
8	Catherine Quittet	France	26	-	-	20	6
9	Zoe Haas	Switzerland	25	-	-	25	-
10	Mateja Svet	Yugoslavia	24	20	-	4	-

=== Giant slalom ===
see complete table

In women's giant slalom World Cup 1987/88 all results count.

Place	Name	Country	Total	11	13	14	22	26	29
1	Mateja Svet	Yugoslavia	87	12	10	3	25	12	25
2	Catherine Quittet	France	78	25	20	12	11	10	-
3	Vreni Schneider	Switzerland	76	20	25	11	20	-	-
4	Anita Wachter	Austria	74	10	11	9	15	9	20
5	Blanca Fernández Ochoa	Spain	66	8	-	15	15	20	8
6	Carole Merle	France	59	7	15	25	5	7	-
7	Christina Meier	West Germany	53	5	-	1	10	25	12
8	Maria Walliser	Switzerland	40	11	9	20	-	-	-
9	Ulrike Maier	Austria	39	-	-	-	9	15	15
10	Michela Figini	Switzerland	29	15	12	2	-	-	-

=== Slalom ===
see complete table

In women's slalom World Cup 1987/88 all results count. Every race saw a different winner.

Place	Name	Country	Total	1	3	8	10	18	20	23	25
1	Roswitha Steiner	Austria	87	11	-	11	11	9	-	20	25
2	Vreni Schneider	Switzerland	80	15	-	-	-	20	25	20	-
3	Anita Wachter	Austria	75	-	25	8	-	3	7	12	20
4	Blanca Fernández Ochoa	Spain	73	25	-	15	6	10	6	11	-
5	Christa Kinshofer	West Germany	67	12	-	-	25	-	20	10	-
6	Corinne Schmidhauser	Switzerland	66	10	-	10	12	12	15	7	-
7	Ida Ladstätter	Austria	60	2	20	25	-	4	9	-	-
8	Mateja Svet	Yugoslavia	56	20	-	-	-	-	11	25	-
9	Camilla Nilsson	Sweden	50	6	12	20	-	-	12	-	-
10	Ulrike Maier	Austria	49	3	15	-	10	7	8	6	-
11	Patricia Chauvet	France	48	-	11	2	20	15	-	-	-
12	Brigitte Oertli	Switzerland	41	-	-	4	8	25	4	-	-

=== Combined ===
see complete table

In women's combined World Cup 1987/88 both results count.

Place	Name	Country	Total	9	21
1	Brigitte Oertli	Switzerland	50	25	25
2	Anita Wachter	Austria	32	20	12
3	Petra Kronberger	Austria	24	9	15
	Karen Percy	Canada	24	15	9
5	Vreni Schneider	Switzerland	20	-	20
6	Maria Walliser	Switzerland	16	10	6
7	Lucia Medzihradzká	Czechoslovakia	15	11	4
8	Michaela Gerg	West Germany	12	12	-
9	Blanca Fernández Ochoa	Spain	11	-	11
10	Ulrike Maier	Austria	10	-	10

== Nations Cup ==
=== Overall ===
Place	Country	Total	Men	Ladies
1	Austria	2004	980	1024
2	Switzerland	1975	891	1084
3	West Germany	845	328	517
4	Italy	727	687	40
5	France	578	247	331
6	Canada	471	246	225
7	Yugoslavia	310	113	197
8	Sweden	290	197	93
9	United States	191	85	106
10	Spain	190	0	190
11	Luxembourg	142	142	0
12	Norway	77	77	0
13	Liechtenstein	76	70	6
14	Japan	51	46	5
15	Czechoslovakia	49	18	31
16	United Kingdom	21	18	3
17	Soviet Union	16	0	16
18	Australia	13	13	0
19	New Zealand	2	0	2
20	Denmark	1	1	0
	Chile	1	0	1

=== Men ===
All points were shown. But without parallel slaloms, because result ? (Also possible, that the parallel slaloms were only show-events.)

Place	Country	Total	DH	SG	GS	SL	KB	Racers	Wins
1	Austria	980	148	149	293	313	77	22	5
2	Switzerland	891	477	111	194	56	53	15	10
3	Italy	687	210	65	133	279	0	20	10
4	West Germany	328	75	58	73	97	25	14	1
5	France	247	117	64	23	5	38	8	1
6	Canada	246	211	27	0	0	8	7	2
7	Sweden	197	22	15	46	94	20	6	0
8	Luxembourg	142	59	38	30	15	0	1	0
9	Yugoslavia	113	0	1	23	89	0	5	0
10	United States	85	9	0	8	53	15	5	0
11	Norway	77	38	8	0	12	19	6	0
12	Liechtenstein	70	0	9	9	52	0	2	1
13	Japan	46	4	0	0	42	0	2	0
14	Czechoslovakia	18	0	0	0	1	17	2	0
	United Kingdom	18	13	5	0	0	0	2	0
16	Australia	13	3	7	0	0	3	1	0
17	Denmark	1	0	0	0	0	1	1	0

=== Ladies ===
All points were shown. But without parallel slaloms, because result ? (Also possible, that the parallel slaloms were only show-events.)

Place	Country	Total	DH	SG	GS	SL	KB	Racers	Wins
1	Switzerland	1084	484	126	167	214	93	15	16
2	Austria	1024	243	167	150	390	74	19	4
3	West Germany	517	130	125	154	75	33	12	2
4	France	331	22	26	172	111	0	8	2
5	Canada	225	167	19	0	10	29	6	0
6	Yugoslavia	197	0	24	87	86	0	4	3
7	Spain	190	0	40	66	73	11	1	1
8	United States	106	29	12	15	44	6	14	0
9	Sweden	93	0	0	16	77	0	5	0
10	Italy	40	18	14	0	8	0	3	0
11	Czechoslovakia	31	0	0	0	16	15	2	0
12	Soviet Union	16	16	0	0	0	0	2	0
13	Liechtenstein	6	0	0	6	0	0	1	0
14	Japan	5	0	0	0	0	5	1	0
15	United Kingdom	3	0	0	0	3	0	1	0
16	New Zealand	2	0	0	0	2	0	1	0
17	Chile	1	0	0	0	1	0	1	0
