= 1989 Alpine Skiing World Cup – Women's combined =

1989 Women's combined World Cup
| Previous: 1988 | Next: 1990 |

Women's combined World Cup 1988/1989

== Calendar ==
| Round | Race No | Discipline | Place | Country | Date | Winner | Second | Third |
|---|---|---|---|---|---|---|---|---|
| 1 | 6 | Downhill slalom | Altenmarkt | Austria | December 15, 1988; December 16, 1988 | (Switzerland) Vreni Schneider | (Austria) Ulrike Maier | (Austria) Petra Kronberger |
| 2 | 17 | Downhill slalom | Grindelwald | Switzerland | January 12 or 13 1989; January 15, 1989 | (Switzerland) Brigitte Oertli | (Canada) Karen Percy | (Switzerland) Michela Figini |

== Final point standings ==
In women's combined World Cup 1988/89 both results count.

| Place | Name | Country | Total points | 6 (Austria) | 17 (Switzerland) |
|---|---|---|---|---|---|
| 1 | Brigitte Oertli | Switzerland | 36 | 11 | 25 |
| 2 | Ulrike Maier | Austria | 31 | 20 | 11 |
| 3 | Vreni Schneider | Switzerland | 25 | 25 | - |
| | Michela Figini | Switzerland | 25 | 10 | 15 |
| 5 | Karen Percy | Canada | 20 | - | 20 |
| 6 | Petra Kronberger | Austria | 19 | 15 | 4 |
| 7 | Heidi Zurbriggen | Switzerland | 15 | 5 | 10 |
| 8 | Tamara McKinney | United States | 12 | 12 | - |
| | Florence Masnada | France | 12 | - | 12 |
| 10 | Ulrike Stanggassinger | West Germany | 9 | 9 | - |
| | Carole Merle | France | 9 | - | 9 |
| | Lenka Kebrlová | Czechoslovakia | 9 | 7 | 2 |
| 13 | Barbara Sadleder | Austria | 8 | 8 | - |
| | Mateja Svet | Yugoslavia | 8 | - | 8 |
| 15 | Lucia Medzihradská | Czechoslovakia | 7 | - | 7 |
| 16 | Rosi Krenn | West Germany | 6 | 6 | - |
| | Beatrice Gafner | Switzerland | 6 | - | 6 |
| 18 | Maria Walliser | Switzerland | 5 | - | 5 |
| 19 | Michelle McKendry | Canada | 4 | 4 | - |
| 20 | Tanja Steinebrunner | Switzerland | 3 | 3 | - |
| | Ľudmila Milanová | Czechoslovakia | 3 | - | 3 |
| 22 | Kerrin Lee | Canada | 2 | 2 | - |
| 23 | Ingrid Stöckl | Austria | 1 | 1 | - |
| | Pascaline Freiher | France | 1 | - | 1 |

== Women's Combined Team Results ==
bold indicate highest score - italics indicate race wins

| Place | Country | Total points | 6 (Austria) | 17 (Switzerland) | Racers | Wins |
|---|---|---|---|---|---|---|
| 1 | Switzerland | 115 | 54 | **61** | 7 | 2 |
| 2 | Austria | 59 | 44 | 15 | 4 | 0 |
| 3 | Canada | 26 | 6 | 20 | 3 | 0 |
| 4 | France | 22 | - | 22 | 3 | 0 |
| 5 | Czechoslovakia | 19 | 7 | 12 | 3 | 0 |
| 6 | West Germany | 15 | 15 | - | 2 | 0 |
| 7 | United States | 12 | 12 | - | 1 | 0 |
| 8 | Yugoslavia | 8 | - | 8 | 1 | 0 |

**Alpine skiing World Cup**
**Women**

Overall | Downhill | Super-G | Giant slalom | Slalom | Combined

**1989**
