= 1989 Alpine Skiing World Cup – Women's downhill =

1989 Women's downhill World Cup
Previous: 1988	Next: 1990

Women's downhill World Cup 1988/1989

== Calendar ==
Round	Race No	Place	Country	Date	Winner	Second	Third
1	3	Val d'Isère	France	December 2, 1988	(Switzerland) Michela Figini	(West Germany) Regine Mösenlechner	(West Germany) Michaela Gerg
2	4	Altenmarkt	Austria	December 15, 1988	(Switzerland) Maria Walliser	(Austria) Veronika Wallinger	(Switzerland) Michela Figini
3	13	Grindelwald	Switzerland	January 12, 1989	(Switzerland) Michela Figini	(Switzerland) Beatrice Gafner	(France) Carole Merle
4	14	Grindelwald	Switzerland	January 13, 1989	(Switzerland) Michela Figini	(France) Carole Merle	(Switzerland) Maria Walliser
5	18	Tignes	France	January 19, 1989	(Switzerland) Maria Walliser	(France) Carole Merle	(West Germany) Michaela Gerg
6	21	Lake Louise	Canada	February 18, 1989	(Switzerland) Michela Figini	(Switzerland) Maria Walliser	(West Germany) Michaela Gerg
7	22	Lake Louise	Canada	February 19, 1989	(Switzerland) Michela Figini	(Switzerland) Maria Walliser	(West Germany) Michaela Gerg
8	23	Steamboat Springs	United States	February 24, 1989	(Switzerland) Michela Figini	(Switzerland) Maria Walliser	(Switzerland) Chantal Bournissen

== Final point standings ==
In women's downhill World Cup 1988/89 all results count.

Place	Name	Country	Total points	3 (France)	4 (Austria)	13 (Switzerland)	14 (Switzerland)	18 (France)	21 (Canada)	22 (Canada)	23 (United States)
1	Michela Figini	Switzerland	176	25	15	25	25	11	25	25	25
2	Maria Walliser	Switzerland	142	5	25	12	15	25	20	20	20
3	Michaela Gerg	West Germany	91	15	4	6	9	15	15	15	12
4	Carole Merle	France	67	12	-	15	20	20	-	-	-
5	Veronika Wallinger	Austria	65	11	20	9	7	-	7	-	11
6	Chantal Bournissen	Switzerland	55	7	-	-	-	9	12	12	15
7	Karen Percy	Canada	53	10	-	5	-	6	10	12	10
8	Regine Mösenlechner	West Germany	45	20	-	4	11	10	-	-	-
9	Heidi Zurbriggen	Switzerland	41	9	-	3	6	12	11	-	-
	Barbara Sadleder	Austria	41	7	12	10	3	-	-	3	6
11	Beatrice Gafner	Switzerland	32	-	-	20	12	-	-	-	-
12	Elisabeth Kirchler	Austria	31	-	8	8	10	5	-	-	-
13	Sigrid Wolf	Austria	28	-	-	11	8	4	-	1	4
14	Katrin Gutensohn	Austria	25	8	-	-	-	8	-	-	9
15	Heidi Zeller	Switzerland	21	-	-	-	-	2	2	9	8
	Claudine Emonet	France	21	2	-	1	2	-	5	10	1
17	Lucie Laroche	Canada	18	-	3	-	-	-	8	7	-
18	Petra Kronberger	Austria	16	4	-	-	4	-	-	4	4
19	Ulrike Stanggassinger	West Germany	14	3	11	-	-	-	-	-	-
	Christina Meier	West Germany	14	-	-	-	-	-	6	8	-
	Rosi Krenn	West Germany	14	-	9	-	-	-	-	-	5
22	Sylvia Eder	Austria	13	1	-	7	5	-	-	-	-
23	Ulla Lodzinya	Soviet Union	12	-	6	-	-	-	1	5	-
24	Karen Lee	Canada	11	-	-	2	-	-	9	-	-
25	Tanja Steinebrunner	Switzerland	10	-	10	-	-	-	-	-	-
	Varvara Zelenskaya	Soviet Union	9	-	-	-	-	-	3	6	-
	Brigitte Oertli	Switzerland	9	-	2	-	-	-	-	-	7
28	Hilary Lindh	United States	8	-	-	-	1	7	-	-	-
	Michelle McKendry	Canada	8	-	-	-	-	4	4	-	-
30	Kendra Kobelka	Canada	7	-	7	-	-	-	-	-	-
31	Petra Bernet	Switzerland	5	-	5	-	-	-	-	-	-
32	Pam Fletcher	United States	4	-	-	-	-	-	-	-	4
33	Karin Dedler	West Germany	2	-	-	-	-	-	-	2	-
34	Marlis Spescha	Switzerland	1	-	1	-	-	-	-	-	-
	Zoe Haas	Switzerland	1	-	-	-	-	1	-	-	-

Alpine skiing World Cup
Women

Overall | Downhill | Super-G | Giant slalom | Slalom | Combined

1989
