= 1989 Alpine Skiing World Cup – Women's giant slalom =

1989 Women's giant slalom World Cup
Previous: 1988	Next: 1990

Women's giant slalom World Cup 1988/1989

== Calendar ==
Round	Race No	Place	Country	Date	Winner	Second	Third
1	2	Les Menuires	France	November 28, 1988	(Switzerland) Vreni Schneider	(Austria) Anita Wachter	(Austria) Ulrike Maier
2	7	Val Zoldana	Italy	December 18, 1988	(Switzerland) Vreni Schneider	(Socialist Federal Republic of Yugoslavia) Mateja Svet	(Austria) Anita Wachter
3	10	Schwarzenberg	Austria	January 6, 1989	(Switzerland) Vreni Schneider	(Austria) Ulrike Maier	(Switzerland) Maria Walliser
4	11	Schwarzenberg	Austria	January 7, 1989	(Switzerland) Vreni Schneider	(Austria) Ulrike Maier	(France) Carole Merle
5	20	Tignes	France	January 21, 1989	(Switzerland) Vreni Schneider	(France) Carole Merle	(Switzerland) Maria Walliser
6	26	Furano	Japan	March 4, 1989	(Switzerland) Maria Walliser	(Socialist Federal Republic of Yugoslavia) Mateja Svet	(Switzerland) Vreni Schneider
7	27	Shiga Kogen	Japan	March 8, 1989	(Switzerland) Vreni Schneider	(Socialist Federal Republic of Yugoslavia) Mateja Svet	(West Germany) Christina Meier

== Final point standings ==
In women's giant slalom World Cup 1988/89 all results count.

Place	Name	Country	Total points	2 (France)	7 (Italy)	10 (Austria)	11 (Austria)	20 (France)	26 (Japan)	27 (Japan)
1	Vreni Schneider	Switzerland	165	25	25	25	25	25	15	25
2	Mateja Svet	Yugoslavia	106	10	20	12	12	12	20	20
3	Maria Walliser	Switzerland	87	-	11	15	9	15	25	12
4	Ulrike Maier	Austria	60	15	-	20	20	5	-	-
5	Anita Wachter	Austria	59	20	15	-	-	10	6	8
6	Carole Merle	France	55	-	10	10	15	20	-	-
7	Catherine Quittet	France	35	-	1	9	3	-	12	10
8	Michaela Gerg	West Germany	34	8	-	-	8	7	-	11
9	Traudl Hächer	West Germany	32	9	-	8	6	2	7	-
10	Ingrid Salvenmoser	Austria	31	3	8	4	5	-	10	1
11	Sylvia Eder	Austria	28	5	-	6	11	-	6	-
	Christina Meier	West Germany	28	-	-	2	-	11	-	15
13	Tamara McKinney	United States	27	-	9	-	1	2	8	7
14	Karen Percy	Canada	24	-	6	11	7	-	-	-
15	Jolanda Kindle	Liechtenstein	22	4	5	-	-	-	11	2
16	Sigrid Wolf	Austria	20	-	2	8	10	-	-	-
17	Michela Figini	Switzerland	18	-	-	-	-	9	9	-
	Camilla Nilsson	Sweden	18	-	7	5	2	-	4	-
19	Blanca Fernández Ochoa	Spain	17	11	-	-	-	6	-	-
20	Zoe Haas	Switzerland	16	-	-	4	4	3	-	5
21	Sandra Burn	Switzerland	15	-	-	-	-	4	2	9
22	Christelle Guignard	France	12	12	-	-	-	-	-	-
	Regine Mösenlechner	West Germany	12	-	12	-	-	-	-	-
	Heidi Zurbriggen	Switzerland	12	-	-	-	-	8	-	4
25	Karin Dedler	West Germany	9	6	3	-	-	-	-	-
26	Hélène Barbier	France	7	7	-	-	-	-	-	-
27	Cathy Chenal	France	6	-	-	-	-	-	-	6
28	Angelika Hurler	West Germany	4	-	4	-	-	-	-	-
29	Petra Kronberger	Austria	3	2	-	1	-	-	-	-
	Diann Roffe	United States	3	-	-	-	-	-	3	-
	Birgit Wolfram	Austria	3	-	-	-	-	-	-	3
32	Veronika Šarec	Yugoslavia	1	1	-	-	-	-	-	-
	Brigitte Gadient	Switzerland	1	-	-	-	-	-	1	-

Alpine skiing World Cup
Women

Overall | Downhill | Super-G | Giant slalom | Slalom | Combined

1989
