= 1989 Alpine Skiing World Cup – Women's super-G =

1989 Women's Super G World Cup
Previous: 1988	Next: 1990

Women's Super-G World Cup 1988/1989

== Calendar ==
Round	Race No	Place	Country	Date	Winner	Second	Third
1	1	Schladming	Austria	November 26, 1988	(France) Carole Merle	(Austria) Ulrike Maier	(Austria) Anita Wachter (West Germany) Regine Mösenlechner
2	15	Grindelwald	Switzerland	January 14, 1989	(France) Carole Merle	(Austria) Sigrid Wolf	(Switzerland) Maria Walliser
3	19	Tignes	France	January 20, 1989	(France) Carole Merle	(Austria) Anita Wachter	(Austria) Sigrid Wolf
4	24	Steamboat Springs	United States	February 25, 1989	(Austria) Sigrid Wolf	(Austria) Anita Wachter	(Switzerland) Michela Figini

== Final point standings ==
In Women's Super-G World Cup 1988/89 all four results count.

Place	Name	Country	Total points	1 (Austria)	15 (Switzerland)	19 (France)	24 (United States)
1	Carole Merle	France	75	25	25	25	-
2	Sigrid Wolf	Austria	71	11	20	15	25
3	Anita Wachter	Austria	56	15	1	20	20
4	Ulrike Maier	Austria	33	20	12	1	-
5	Michela Figini	Switzerland	29	9	5	-	15
6	Maria Walliser	Switzerland	27	-	15	12	-
	Regine Mösenlechner	West Germany	27	15	3	9	-
8	Michaela Gerg	West Germany	23	8	8	7	-
9	Catherine Quittet	France	22	-	-	11	11
10	Heidi Zurbriggen	Switzerland	18	-	2	6	10
	Cathy Chedal	France	18	4	-	10	4
12	Karen Percy	Canada	13	-	-	5	8
	Veronika Wallinger	Austria	13	-	7	-	6
14	Petra Kronberger	Austria	12	6	6	-	-
	Traudl Hächer	West Germany	12	10	-	2	-
	Ulla Lodzinya	Soviet Union	12	-	-	-	12
17	Elisabeth Kirchler	Austria	11	-	11	-	-
	Vreni Schneider	Switzerland	11	7	-	4	-
19	Heidi Zeller	Switzerland	10	-	10	-	-
20	Barbara Sadleder	Austria	9	-	9	-	-
	Kendra Kobelka	Canada	9	-	-	-	9
22	Claudine Emonet	France	8	-	-	8	-
	Brigitte Oertli	Switzerland	8	-	-	3	5
24	Zoe Haas	Switzerland	7	-	-	-	7
25	Ulrike Stanggassinger	West Germany	5	5	-	-	-
26	Karin Dedler	West Germany	4	-	4	-	-
	Blanca Fernández Ochoa	Spain	4	-	-	-	4
28	Sylvia Eder	Austria	3	3	-	-	-
29	Sabine Ginther	Austria	2	2	-	-	-
	Kristin Krone	United States	2	-	-	-	2
	Katrin Gutensohn	Austria	2	1	-	-	1

Alpine skiing World Cup
Women

Overall | Downhill | Super-G | Giant Slalom | Slalom | Combined

1989
