= 1989–90 FIS Alpine Ski World Cup =

International sports competition

FIS Alpine Ski World Cup 1989/90
Discipline	Men	Women
Overall	(Switzerland) Pirmin Zurbriggen	(Austria) Petra Kronberger
Downhill	(Austria) Helmut Höflehner	(West Germany) Katharina Gutensohn
Super G	(Switzerland) Pirmin Zurbriggen	(France) Carole Merle
Giant Slalom	(Norway) Ole Kristian Furuseth (Austria) Günther Mader	(Austria) Anita Wachter
Slalom	(West Germany) Armin Bittner	(Switzerland) Vreni Schneider
Nations Cup	Austria	Austria
- Nations Cup overall: Austria

Competition
Locations	19	16
Individual	34	33

The 24th World Cup season began in August 1989 in Australia (for men) and Argentina (for women), resumed in November 1989 in the United States and concluded in March 1990 in Sweden. During this season, the Soviet Union's empire collapsed, leading to the reunification of East and West Germany, the dissolution of Yugoslavia and Czechoslovakia, and many other changes in Eastern Europe, which would have a significant effect on future World Cup seasons.

The overall champions were Pirmin Zurbriggen of Switzerland (his fourth, tying the men's record held by Gustav Thöni) and Petra Kronberger of Austria (her first). At the end of the season, Zurbriggen retired, as did former women's World Cup overall champions Tamara McKinney of the United States and Maria Walliser and Michela Figini of Switzerland.

== Calendar ==
=== Men ===
Event Key: DH – Downhill, SL – Slalom, GS – Giant Slalom, SG – Super Giant Slalom, KB – Combined
Race	Season	Date	Place	Type	Winner	Second	Third
664	1	11 August 1989	(Australia) Thredbo	GS _{178}	(Sweden) Lars-Börje Eriksson	(Norway) Ole Kristian Furuseth	(Austria) Günther Mader
665	2	12 August 1989	(Australia) Thredbo	SL _{203}	(West Germany) Armin Bittner	(Norway) Ole Kristian Furuseth	(Austria) Bernhard Gstrein
666	3	23 November 1989	(United States) Park City	GS _{179}	(Norway) Ole Kristian Furuseth	(Switzerland) Pirmin Zurbriggen	(Italy) Ivano Camozzi
667	4	29 November 1989	(United States) Waterville Valley	SL _{204}	(Italy) Alberto Tomba	(Switzerland) Pirmin Zurbriggen	(Luxembourg) Marc Girardelli
668	5	30 November 1989	(United States) Waterville Valley	GS _{180}	(Switzerland) Urs Kälin	(Sweden) Lars-Börje Eriksson	(Austria) Günther Mader
669	6	2 December 1989	(Canada) Mont St. Anne	GS _{181}	(Austria) Günther Mader	(Norway) Ole Kristian Furuseth	(West Germany) Armin Bittner
670	7	3 December 1989	(Canada) Mont St. Anne	SL _{205}	(Austria) Thomas Stangassinger	(Austria) Bernhard Gstrein	(Luxembourg) Marc Girardelli
671	8	10 December 1989	(France) Val d'Isère	SG _{031}	(Sweden) Niklas Henning	(France) Franck Piccard	(Italy) Peter Runggaldier
672	9	12 December 1989	(Italy) Sestriere	SG _{032}	(Switzerland) Pirmin Zurbriggen	(Sweden) Lars-Börje Eriksson	(France) Franck Piccard
673	10	16 December 1989	(Italy) Val Gardena	DH _{198}	(Switzerland) Pirmin Zurbriggen	(Switzerland) Franz Heinzer	(Italy) Kristian Ghedina
674	11	6 January 1990	(Socialist Federal Republic of Yugoslavia) Kranjska Gora	SL _{206}	(Sweden) Jonas Nilsson	(Austria) Hubert Strolz	(Austria) Michael Tritscher
675	12	7 January 1990	(Socialist Federal Republic of Yugoslavia) Kranjska Gora	SL _{207}	(West Germany) Armin Bittner	(Austria) Bernhard Gstrein	(Switzerland) Paul Accola
676	13	11 January 1990	(Austria) Schladming	DH _{199}	(France) Franck Piccard	(Italy) Kristian Ghedina	(Switzerland) Daniel Mahrer
677	14	12 January 1990	(Austria) Schladming	SL _{208}	(West Germany) Armin Bittner	(Austria) Michael Tritscher	(Italy) Konrad Ladstätter (Japan) Tetsuya Okabe
678	15	12 January 1990	(Austria) Schladming	KB _{057}	(Switzerland) Pirmin Zurbriggen	(Switzerland) Paul Accola	(Austria) Günther Mader
679	16	14 January 1990	(Italy) Alta Badia	GS _{182}	(Austria) Richard Kröll	(Austria) Günther Mader	(Austria) Hubert Strolz (Austria) Rudolf Nierlich
680	17	20 January 1990	(Austria) Kitzbühel	DH _{200}	(Norway) Atle Skårdal	(Austria) Helmut Höflehner	(Switzerland) Pirmin Zurbriggen
681	18	21 January 1990	(Austria) Kitzbühel	SL _{209}	(Austria) Rudolf Nierlich	(Norway) Ole Kristian Furuseth	(West Germany) Armin Bittner
682	19	21 January 1990	(Austria) Kitzbühel	KB _{058}	(Switzerland) Pirmin Zurbriggen	(Switzerland) Paul Accola	(West Germany) Markus Wasmeier
683	20	23 January 1990	(Switzerland) Veysonnaz	GS _{183}	(Austria) Richard Kröll	(Austria) Hubert Strolz	(Austria) Rudolf Nierlich
684	21	27 January 1990	(France) Val d'Isère	DH _{201}	(Austria) Helmut Höflehner	(Norway) Atle Skårdal	(Switzerland) William Besse
685	22	29 January 1990	(France) Val d'Isère	DH _{202}	(Austria) Helmut Höflehner	(Switzerland) William Besse	(Switzerland) Franz Heinzer
686	23	29 January 1990	(France) Val d'Isère	SG _{033}	(Switzerland) Steve Locher	(France) Armand Schiele	(Austria) Günther Mader
687	24	30 January 1990	(France) Les Menuires	SG _{034}	(Austria) Günther Mader	(Norway) Ole Kristian Furuseth	(Norway) Atle Skårdal
688	25	3 February 1990	(Italy) Cortina d'Ampezzo	DH _{203}	(Italy) Kristian Ghedina	(Switzerland) Daniel Mahrer	(Austria) Helmut Höflehner
689	26	4 February 1990	(Italy) Cortina d'Ampezzo	DH _{204}	(Austria) Helmut Höflehner	(Switzerland) Franz Heinzer (Norway) Atle Skårdal	
690	27	6 February 1990	(Italy) Courmayeur	SG _{035}	(Switzerland) Pirmin Zurbriggen	(Austria) Günther Mader	(Italy) Peter Runggaldier
691	28	3 March 1990	(Switzerland) Veysonnaz	GS _{184}	(Sweden) Fredrik Nyberg	(Austria) Hubert Strolz	(Austria) Richard Kröll
692	29	4 March 1990	(Switzerland) Veysonnaz	SL _{210}	(West Germany) Armin Bittner	(Italy) Alberto Tomba	(Austria) Hubert Strolz
693	30	8 March 1990	(Norway) Geilo	SL _{211}	(Italy) Alberto Tomba	(Austria) Michael Tritscher	(Sweden) Jonas Nilsson
694	31	10 March 1990	(Norway) Hemsedal	SG _{036}	(Switzerland) Pirmin Zurbriggen	(Switzerland) Karl Alpiger	(West Germany) Hans Stuffer
695	32	12 March 1990	(Sweden) Sälen	SL _{212}	(Italy) Alberto Tomba	(Austria) Rudolf Nierlich	(West Germany) Armin Bittner
696	33	15 March 1990	(Sweden) Åre	DH _{205}	(Italy) Kristian Ghedina	(Switzerland) Franz Heinzer	(Austria) Helmut Höflehner
697	34	17 March 1990	(Sweden) Åre	DH _{206}	(Norway) Atle Skårdal	(Austria) Helmut Höflehner	(Canada) Felix Belczyk

=== Ladies ===
Event Key: DH – Downhill, SL – Slalom, GS – Giant Slalom, SG – Super Giant Slalom, KB – Combined
Race	Season	Date	Place	Type	Winner	Second	Third
612	1	8 August 1989	(Argentina) Las Leñas	DH _{165}	(West Germany) Michaela Gerg	(Switzerland) Heidi Zeller	(Austria) Veronika Wallinger
613	2	9 August 1989	(Argentina) Las Leñas	SG _{027}	(Austria) Anita Wachter	(France) Cathy Chedal	(Austria) Petra Kronberger
	3	24 November 1989	(United States) Park City	GS	(France) Nathalie Bouvier	(United States) Diann Roffe	(Austria) Anita Wachter
615	4	25 November 1989	(United States) Park City	SL _{199}	(Switzerland) Vreni Schneider	(Austria) Monika Maierhofer	(Austria) Anita Wachter
616	5	2 December 1989	(United States) Vail	SG _{028}	(West Germany) Regine Mösenlechner	(Austria) Sigrid Wolf	(West Germany) Michaela Gerg
	6	3 December 1989	(United States) Vail	GS	(Austria) Anita Wachter	(United States) Diann Roffe	(Switzerland) Vreni Schneider
618	7	9 December 1989	(United States) Steamboat Springs	DH _{166}	(Switzerland) Maria Walliser	(Switzerland) Michela Figini	(West Germany) Michaela Gerg
619	8	10 December 1989	(United States) Steamboat Springs	SL _{200}	(Austria) Claudia Strobl	(Socialist Federal Republic of Yugoslavia) Veronika Šarec	(Austria) Karin Buder
620	9	10 December 1989	(United States) Steamboat Springs	KB _{051}	(Switzerland) Brigitte Örtli	(West Germany) Michaela Gerg	(Austria) Anita Wachter
621	10	16 December 1989	(Canada) Panorama	DH _{167}	(Austria) Petra Kronberger	(West Germany) Michaela Gerg	(Canada) Karen Percy
622	11	17 December 1989	(Canada) Panorama	DH _{168}	(Austria) Petra Kronberger	(West Germany) Katharina Gutensohn	(West Germany) Michaela Gerg
623	12	6 January 1990	(Italy) Piancavallo	SL _{201}	(Switzerland) Vreni Schneider	(Austria) Monika Maierhofer	(Austria) Claudia Strobl
624	13	8 January 1990	(Austria) Hinterstoder	GS _{175}	(Austria) Petra Kronberger	(Austria) Anita Wachter	(West Germany) Michaela Gerg
625	14	9 January 1990	(Austria) Hinterstoder	SL _{202}	(Switzerland) Vreni Schneider	(Austria) Anita Wachter	(Switzerland) Christine von Grünigen
626	15	13 January 1990	(Austria) Haus im Ennstal	DH _{169}	(Switzerland) Maria Walliser	(Austria) Petra Kronberger	(West Germany) Karin Dedler
627	16	14 January 1990	(Austria) Haus im Ennstal	SL _{203}	(Socialist Federal Republic of Yugoslavia) Veronika Šarec	(Austria) Monika Maierhofer	(Austria) Claudia Strobl
628	17	14 January 1990	(Austria) Haus im Ennstal	KB _{052}	(Austria) Petra Kronberger	(Austria) Anita Wachter	(Austria) Ingrid Stöckl
629	18	20 January 1990	(Socialist Federal Republic of Yugoslavia) Maribor	GS _{176}	(Socialist Federal Republic of Yugoslavia) Mateja Svet	(Austria) Anita Wachter	(Switzerland) Maria Walliser
630	19	21 January 1990	(Socialist Federal Republic of Yugoslavia) Maribor	SL _{204}	(Switzerland) Vreni Schneider	(Austria) Ida Ladstätter	(France) Patricia Chauvet
631	20	27 January 1990	(Italy) Santa Caterina	DH _{170}	(Switzerland) Michela Figini	(West Germany) Miriam Vogt	(Austria) Petra Kronberger
632	21	27 January 1990	(Italy) Santa Caterina	SG _{029}	(Austria) Sigrid Wolf	(France) Carole Merle	(Austria) Petra Kronberger
633	22	28 January 1990	(Italy) Santa Caterina	GS _{177}	(Austria) Petra Kronberger	(Austria) Anita Wachter	(Switzerland) Zoë Haas
634	23	3 February 1990	(Switzerland) Veysonnaz	DH _{171}	(West Germany) Katharina Gutensohn	(France) Carole Merle	(Switzerland) Michela Figini
635	24	4 February 1990	(Switzerland) Veysonnaz	DH _{172}	(West Germany) Katharina Gutensohn	(France) Carole Merle	(West Germany) Karin Dedler
	25	5 February 1990	(Switzerland) Veysonnaz	GS	(Socialist Federal Republic of Yugoslavia) Mateja Svet	(Austria) Anita Wachter	(United States) Diann Roffe
637	26	10 February 1990	(France) Méribel	SG _{030}	(France) Carole Merle	(Switzerland) Maria Walliser	(West Germany) Michaela Gerg
638	27	11 February 1990	(France) Méribel	SG _{031}	(France) Carole Merle	(West Germany) Katja Seizinger	(Switzerland) Maria Walliser
639	28	10 March 1990	(Norway) Stranda	GS _{179}	(France) Carole Merle	(United States) Kristi Terzian	(France) Florence Masnada
640	29	11 March 1990	(Norway) Stranda	SL _{205}	(Austria) Karin Buder	(Austria) Claudia Strobl	(Austria) Anita Wachter
641	30	13 March 1990	(Sweden) Vemdalen	SL _{206}	(Austria) Petra Kronberger	(Austria) Ida Ladstätter	(Austria) Claudia Strobl
642	31	14 March 1990	(Sweden) Klövsjö	GS _{180}	(France) Carole Merle	(Norway) Julie Lunde Hansen	(Socialist Federal Republic of Yugoslavia) Mateja Svet
643	32	16 March 1990	(Sweden) Åre	SG _{032}	(France) Carole Merle	(West Germany) Michaela Gerg	(Austria) Petra Kronberger
644	33	18 March 1990	(Sweden) Åre	SL _{207}	(Switzerland) Vreni Schneider	(France) Patricia Chauvet	(Sweden) Pernilla Wiberg

== Men ==
=== Overall ===
see complete table

In Men's Overall World Cup all results count. Pirmin Zurbriggen won his fourth Overall World Cup. He became the second male athlete to win four times. Following Gustav Thöni, who won his fourth Overall World Cup 15 years ago.

Place	Name	Country	Total	DH	SG	GS	SL	KB
1	Pirmin Zurbriggen	Switzerland	357	105	98	48	56	50
2	Ole Kristian Furuseth	Norway	234	0	43	96	95	0
3	Günther Mader	Austria	213	0	71	96	31	15
4	Armin Bittner	West Germany	193	0	0	43	150	0
5	Helmut Höflehner	Austria	174	166	8	0	0	0
6	Atle Skårdal	Norway	167	120	47	0	0	0
7	Hubert Strolz	Austria	155	0	33	71	51	0
8	Lars-Börje Eriksson	Sweden	121	4	61	56	0	0
9	Alberto Tomba	Italy	116	0	0	21	95	0
10	Rudolf Nierlich	Austria	110	0	0	42	68	0
11	Paul Accola	Switzerland	109	0	11	0	58	40
12	Daniel Mahrer	Switzerland	105	88	9	0	0	8
13	William Besse	Switzerland	102	88	0	0	0	14
14	Franck Piccard	France	101	27	52	12	0	10
15	Konrad Ladstätter	Italy	97	0	28	0	69	0
	Kristian Ghedina	Italy	97	87	0	0	0	10
17	Bernhard Gstrein	Austria	96	0	0	5	91	0
18	Franz Heinzer	Switzerland	95	84	10	0	0	1
19	Michael Tritscher	Austria	93	0	0	0	93	0
20	Markus Wasmeier	West Germany	91	20	35	9	0	27

=== Downhill ===
see complete table

In Men's Downhill World Cup 1989/90 all results count. Race No. 17 at Kitzbühel saw the first ever downhill-sprint held in two heats.

Place	Name	Country	Total	10 (Italy)	13 (Austria)	17 (Austria)	21 (France)	22 (France)	25 (Italy)	26 (Italy)	33 (Sweden)	34 (Sweden)
1	Helmut Höflehner	Austria	166	10	11	20	25	25	15	25	15	20
2	Atle Skårdal	Norway	120	-	-	25	20	9	10	20	11	25
3	Pirmin Zurbriggen	Switzerland	105	25	9	15	11	11	11	10	8	5
4	Daniel Mahrer	Switzerland	88	5	15	8	5	12	20	12	-	11
	William Besse	Switzerland	88	12	5	12	15	20	-	6	9	9
6	Kristian Ghedina	Italy	87	15	20	-	-	-	25	1	25	1
7	Franz Heinzer	Switzerland	84	20	-	8	-	15	1	20	20	-
8	Felix Belczyk	Canada	49	-	-	-	9	6	7	2	10	15
9	Roman Rupp	Austria	38	-	-	10	6	10	4	8	-	-
10	Bernhard Fahner	Switzerland	35	11	-	9	3	-	9	3	-	-
11	Peter Wirnsberger	Austria	34	9	-	-	-	-	6	7	12	-
12	Danilo Sbardellotto	Italy	28	-	-	-	-	-	-	11	5	12
13	Franck Piccard	France	27	-	25	2	-	-	-	-	-	-

=== Super-G ===
see complete table

In Men's Super-G World Cup 1989/90 all results count. Pirmin Zurbriggen won his fourth Super-G World Cup in a row!

Place	Name	Country	Total	8 (France)	9 (Italy)	23 (France)	24 (France)	27 (Italy)	31 (Norway)
1	Pirmin Zurbriggen	Switzerland	98	8	25	6	9	25	25
2	Günther Mader	Austria	71	-	1	15	25	20	10
3	Lars-Börje Eriksson	Sweden	61	12	20	10	12	2	5
4	Franck Piccard	France	52	20	15	7	10	-	-
5	Atle Skårdal	Norway	47	-	12	11	15	-	9
6	Ole Kristian Furuseth	Norway	43	11	-	12	20	-	-
7	Niklas Henning	Sweden	39	25	11	-	-	3	-
8	Peter Runggaldier	Italy	37	15	-	-	-	15	7
9	Armand Schiele	France	35	4	-	20	11	-	-
	Markus Wasmeier	West Germany	35	10	-	8	7	10	-
11	Hubert Strolz	Austria	33	2	4	1	8	12	6
12	Hans Stuffer	West Germany	30	-	-	5	-	10	15
13	Konrad Ladstätter	Italy	28	6	9	2	-	11	-
14	Stephan Eberharter	Austria	26	-	-	9	5	4	8
15	Steve Locher	Switzerland	25	-	-	25	-	-	-

=== Giant Slalom ===
see complete table

In Men's Giant Slalom World Cup 1989/90 all results count. There were 6 different winners in 7 races. Richard Kröll won two consecutive races (in the first, Alta Badia, he had the starting number 34). Ole Kristian Furuseth won this title for a second year in a row (20 points two times).

Place	Name	Country	Total	1 (Australia)	3 (United States)	5 (United States)	6 (Canada)	16 (Italy)	20 (Switzerland)	28 (Switzerland)
1	Ole Kristian Furuseth	Norway	96	20	25	-	20	11	12	8
2	Günther Mader	Austria	96	15	-	15	25	20	11	10
3	Hubert Strolz	Austria	71	3	11	-	2	15	20	20
4	Richard Kröll	Austria	65	-	-	-	-	25	25	15
5	Lars-Börje Eriksson	Sweden	56	25	-	20	-	-	-	11
6	Pirmin Zurbriggen	Switzerland	48	10	20	9	-	-	2	7
7	Armin Bittner	West Germany	43	7	12	-	15	-	-	9
8	Rudolf Nierlich	Austria	42	-	-	-	12	15	15	-
9	Fredrik Nyberg	Sweden	35	-	-	-	-	10	-	25
10	Hans Pieren	Switzerland	31	1	-	10	-	6	9	5
11	Urs Kälin	Switzerland	25	-	-	25	-	-	-	-

=== Slalom ===
see complete table

In Men's Slalom World Cup 1989/90 all results count.

Place	Name	Country	Total	2 (Australia)	4 (United States)	7 (Canada)	11 (Socialist Federal Republic of Yugoslavia)	12 (Socialist Federal Republic of Yugoslavia)	14 (Austria)	18 (Austria)	29 (Switzerland)	30 (Norway)	32 (Sweden)
1	Armin Bittner	West Germany	150	25	11	9	-	25	25	15	25	-	15
2	Alberto Tomba	Italy	95	-	25	-	-	-	-	-	20	25	25
	Ole Kristian Furuseth	Norway	95	20	12	10	10	9	-	20	-	8	6
4	Michael Tritscher	Austria	93	-	7	-	15	11	20	12	-	20	8
5	Bernhard Gstrein	Austria	91	15	10	20	11	20	-	-	4	11	-
6	Jonas Nilsson	Sweden	78	-	1	5	25	12	-	11	-	15	9
7	Tetsuya Okabe	Japan	75	3	-	12	-	-	15	11	12	10	12
8	Konrad Ladstätter	Italy	69	-	9	7	7	10	15	-	11	-	10
9	Rudolf Nierlich	Austria	68	1	-	-	12	-	10	25	-	-	20
10	Paul Accola	Switzerland	58	7	5	6	9	15	8	8	-	-	-
11	Pirmin Zurbriggen	Switzerland	56	9	20	-	-	-	6	4	10	7	-
	Thomas Stangassinger	Austria	56	12	-	25	-	-	-	-	-	12	7

=== Combined ===
see complete table

In Men's Combined World Cup 1989/90 both results count.

Place	Name	Country	Total	15 (Austria)	19 (Austria)
1	Pirmin Zurbriggen	Switzerland	50	25	25
2	Paul Accola	Switzerland	40	20	20
3	Markus Wasmeier	West Germany	27	12	15
4	Thomas Hangl	Austria	23	11	12
5	Günther Mader	Austria	15	15	-
6	William Besse	Switzerland	14	3	11
7	Kristian Ghedina	Italy	10	10	-
	Franck Piccard	France	10	-	10
9	Peter Runggaldier	Italy	9	9	-
	Peter Wirnsberger	Austria	9	-	9

== Ladies ==
=== Overall ===
see complete table

In Women's Overall World Cup all results count. After 11 years Petra Kronberger was able to bring back the Women's Overall World Cup to Austria.

Place	Name	Country	Total	DH	SG	GS	SL	KB
1	Petra Kronberger	Austria	341	106	69	85	56	25
2	Anita Wachter	Austria	300	0	43	133	89	35
3	Michaela Gerg	West Germany	270	105	79	47	7	32
4	Maria Walliser	Switzerland	227	99	56	55	0	17
5	Carole Merle	France	202	50	99	53	0	0
6	Vreni Schneider	Switzerland	198	0	4	69	125	0
7	Mateja Svet	Yugoslavia	140	0	0	89	51	0
8	Michela Figini	Switzerland	134	105	24	5	0	0
9	Sigrid Wolf	Austria	133	33	73	27	0	0
10	Diann Roffe	United States	130	0	29	82	19	0
11	Karin Dedler	West Germany	125	62	36	21	0	6
12	Katharina Gutensohn	West Germany	114	110	4	0	0	0
13	Claudia Strobl	Austria	108	0	0	0	108	0
14	Veronika Wallinger	Austria	102	69	33	0	0	0
15	Ida Ladstätter	Austria	98	0	0	0	98	0
	Karin Buder	Austria	94	0	0	0	94	0
17	Kristi Terzian	United States	93	0	18	32	32	11
18	Regine Mösenlechner	West Germany	85	9	52	24	0	0
19	Monika Maierhofer	Austria	83	0	0	12	71	0
20	Heidi Zeller	Switzerland	72	62	3	0	0	7

=== Downhill ===
see complete table

In Women's Downhill World Cup 1989/90 all results count.

Place	Name	Country	Total	1 (Argentina)	7 (United States)	10 (Canada)	11 (Canada)	15 (Austria)	20 (Italy)	23 (Switzerland)	24 (Switzerland)
1	Katharina Gutensohn	West Germany	110	-	11	12	20	10	7	25	25
2	Petra Kronberger	Austria	106	7	3	25	25	20	15	3	8
3	Michaela Gerg	West Germany	105	25	15	20	15	6	12	2	10
	Michela Figini	Switzerland	105	12	20	10	9	7	25	15	7
5	Maria Walliser	Switzerland	99	11	25	-	9	25	11	9	9
6	Veronika Wallinger	Austria	69	15	12	11	5	12	2	-	12
7	Heidi Zeller	Switzerland	62	20	8	5	12	-	10	7	-
	Karin Dedler	West Germany	62	6	5	7	6	15	-	8	15
9	Miriam Vogt	West Germany	54	-	10	2	2	9	20	11	-
10	Carole Merle	France	50	10	-	-	-	-	-	20	20

=== Super-G ===
see complete table

In Women's Super-G World Cup 1989/90 all results count.

Place	Name	Country	Total	2 (Argentina)	5 (United States)	21 (Italy)	26 (France)	27 (France)	32 (Sweden)
1	Carole Merle	France	99	4	-	20	25	25	25
2	Michaela Gerg	West Germany	79	6	15	12	15	11	20
3	Sigrid Wolf	Austria	73	-	20	25	11	6	11
4	Petra Kronberger	Austria	69	15	7	15	5	12	15
5	Maria Walliser	Switzerland	56	-	12	-	20	15	9
6	Regine Mösenlechner	West Germany	52	12	25	4	1	-	10
7	Cathy Chedal	France	45	20	-	5	6	2	12
8	Anita Wachter	Austria	43	25	-	-	12	-	6
9	Karin Dedler	West Germany	36	8	10	9	9	-	-
10	Veronika Wallinger	Austria	33	5	-	10	8	10	-

=== Giant Slalom ===
see complete table

In Women's Giant Slalom World Cup 1989/90 all results count. Anita Wachter won the cup with only one win.

Place	Name	Country	Total	3 (United States)	6 (United States)	13 (Austria)	18 (Socialist Federal Republic of Yugoslavia)	22 (Italy)	25 (Switzerland)	28 (Norway)	31 (Sweden)
1	Anita Wachter	Austria	133	15	25	20	20	20	20	4	9
2	Mateja Svet	Yugoslavia	89	-	1	3	25	8	25	12	15
3	Petra Kronberger	Austria	85	4	-	25	12	25	2	10	7
4	Diann Roffe	United States	82	20	20	10	9	-	15	-	8
5	Vreni Schneider	Switzerland	69	-	15	11	11	11	9	-	12
6	Maria Walliser	Switzerland	55	3	-	6	15	12	10	3	6
7	Carole Merle	France	53	-	-	-	-	3	-	25	25
8	Michaela Gerg	West Germany	47	10	7	15	-	9	6	-	-
9	Zoe Haas	Switzerland	43	11	-	-	-	15	12	5	-
10	Nathalie Bouvier	France	39	25	8	-	-	-	-	6	-

=== Slalom ===
see complete table

In Women's Slalom World Cup 1989/90 all results count.

Place	Name	Country	Total	4 (United States)	8 (United States)	12 (Italy)	14 (Austria)	16 (Austria)	19 (Socialist Federal Republic of Yugoslavia)	29 (Norway)	30 (Sweden)	33 (Sweden)
1	Vreni Schneider	Switzerland	125	25	-	25	25	-	25	-	-	25
2	Claudia Strobl	Austria	108	7	25	15	11	15	-	20	15	-
3	Ida Ladstätter	Austria	98	6	12	6	-	12	20	11	20	11
4	Karin Buder	Austria	94	11	15	4	12	3	-	25	12	12
5	Anita Wachter	Austria	89	15	8	12	20	5	8	15	6	-
6	Monika Maierhofer	Austria	71	20	-	20	-	20	11	-	-	-
7	Christine von Grünigen	Switzerland	61	-	-	10	15	9	9	8	-	10
8	Patricia Chauvet	France	59	-	7	-	-	10	15	-	7	20
9	Kristina Andersson	Sweden	58	8	11	7	6	8	10	-	-	8
10	Veronika Šarec	Yugoslavia	56	-	20	11	-	25	-	-	-	-
	Petra Kronberger	Austria	56	12	-	2	8	-	-	9	25	-

=== Combined ===
see complete table

In Women's Combined World Cup 1989/90 both results count.

Place	Name	Country	Total	9 (United States)	17 (Austria)
1	Anita Wachter	Austria	35	15	20
2	Michaela Gerg	West Germany	32	20	12
3	Brigitte Oertli	Switzerland	25	25	-
	Petra Kronberger	Austria	25	-	25
5	Chantal Bournissen	Switzerland	23	12	11
6	Ingrid Stöckl	Austria	21	6	15
7	Maria Walliser	Switzerland	17	8	9
8	Heidi Zurbriggen	Switzerland	14	4	10
	Anja Haas	Austria	14	7	7
10	Kristi Terzian	United States	11	11	-

== Nations Cup ==
=== Overall ===
Place	Country	Total	Men	Ladies
1	Austria	2793	1249	1544
2	Switzerland	1981	1075	906
3	West Germany	1224	448	776
4	France	671	228	443
5	Italy	577	556	21
6	Norway	516	462	54
7	Sweden	467	321	146
8	United States	370	84	286
9	Yugoslavia	329	36	293
10	Canada	178	88	90
11	Japan	75	75	0
12	Luxembourg	64	64	0
13	Liechtenstein	26	26	0
14	Soviet Union	20	1	19
15	United Kingdom	3	3	0

=== Men ===
Place	Country	Total	DH	SG	GS	SL	KB	Racers	Wins
1	Austria	1249	293	140	379	399	38	19	9
2	Switzerland	1075	446	187	139	137	166	21	8
3	Italy	556	143	98	53	238	24	19	5
4	Norway	462	128	112	126	96	0	6	3
5	West Germany	448	73	79	73	196	27	8	4
6	Sweden	321	13	102	127	79	0	5	4
7	France	228	51	114	27	26	10	10	1
8	Canada	88	73	0	0	15	0	3	0
9	United States	84	28	0	0	45	11	7	0
10	Japan	75	0	0	0	75	0	1	0
11	Luxembourg	64	0	0	23	41	0	1	0
12	Yugoslavia	36	0	0	23	13	0	5	0
13	Liechtenstein	26	0	0	0	26	0	1	0
14	United Kingdom	3	3	0	0	0	0	1	0
15	Soviet Union	1	1	0	0	0	0	1	0

=== Ladies ===
Place	Country	Total	DH	SG	GS	SL	KB	Racers	Wins
1	Austria	1544	293	250	333	554	114	17	11
2	Switzerland	906	297	118	182	219	90	12	9
3	West Germany	776	355	218	124	37	42	14	4
4	France	443	66	164	137	76	0	8	6
5	Yugoslavia	293	0	0	128	165	0	4	3
6	United States	286	18	65	118	67	18	9	0
7	Sweden	146	0	0	24	122	0	4	1
8	Canada	90	64	11	2	5	8	7	0
9	Norway	54	0	0	51	0	3	3	0
10	Italy	21	0	9	10	2	0	2	0
11	Soviet Union	19	18	0	0	0	1	3	0
