= Markus Dürager =

Austrian alpine skier

Markus Dürager (born 20 February 1990) is an Austrian Alpine skier. He specializes in the speed disciplines Downhill and Super Giant Slalom.

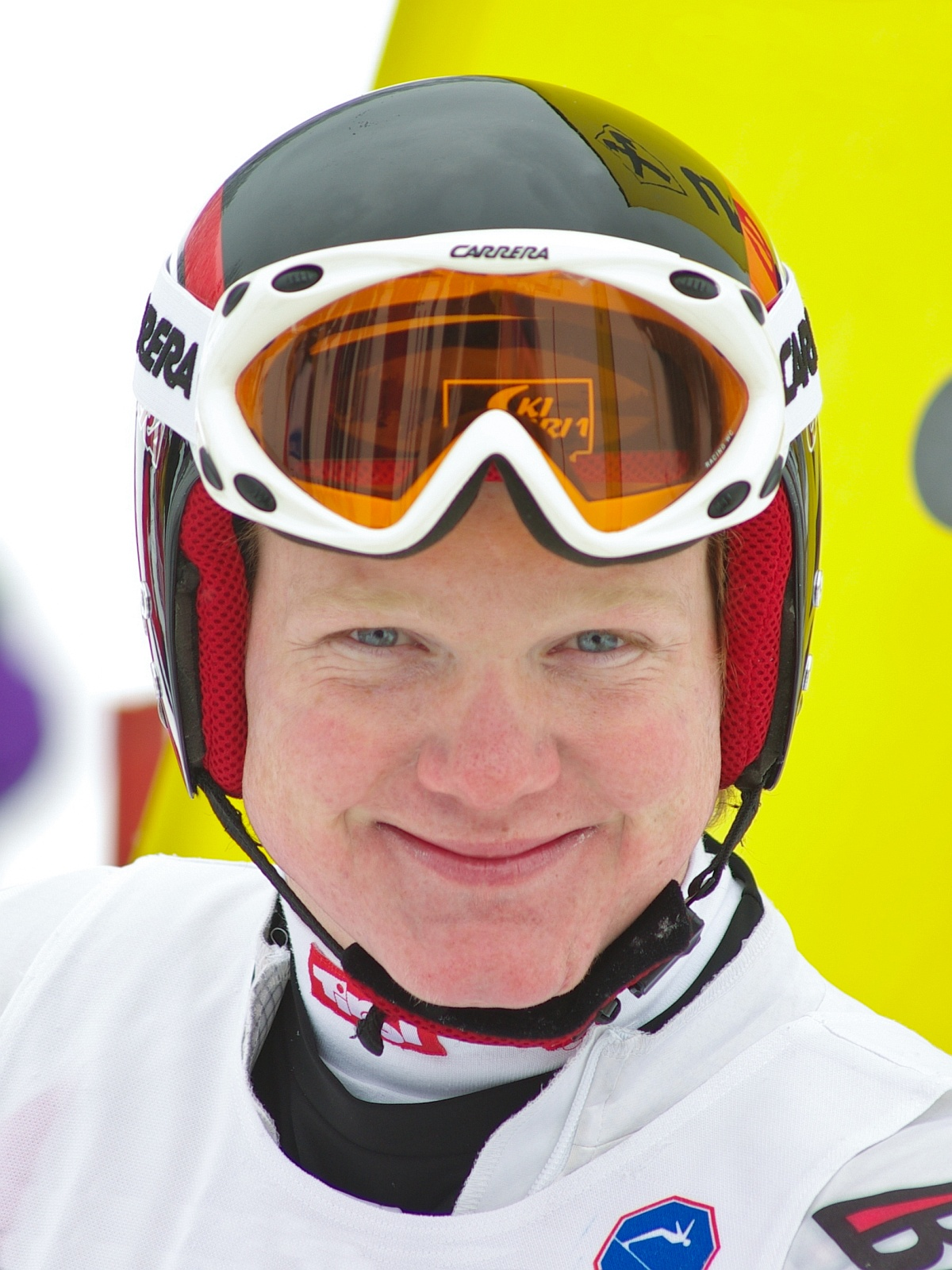
Markus Dürager at the Austrian Championships 2009

== Life ==
Dürager comes from Altenmarkt im Pongau in Salzburg. He attended the Skihandelsschule Schladming. His father is Alpin-Sportwart and responsible for the youth of the Union Sportclub Altenmarkt. Markus younger brother Matthäus is also a skier. In December 2005 Dürager participated in his first FIS-Rennen. In March 2007 he became Austrian youth champion (class Jugend I) in downhill. In December 2007 he participated at his home race in Altenmarkt-Zauchensee for the first time in the Europacup. After he won a FIS race for the first time in 2008, he raced at the Juniorenweltmeisterschaft 2008 in Formigal, where he finished 16. in downhill. At his second Juniorenweltmeisterschaft 2010 in Megève he was 15. in Super-G and 20. in downhill.
