= Katjuša Pušnik =

Slovenian alpine skier (born 1969)

Katjuša Pušnik (born 31 January 1969, in Črna na Koroškem) is a Slovenian former alpine skier who competed in the 1992 Winter Olympics.

== World Cup results ==
=== Season standings ===
| Season | Age | Overall | Slalom | Giant slalom | Super-G | Downhill | Combined |
|---|---|---|---|---|---|---|---|
| 1989 | 19 | 31 | 10 | — | — | — | — |
| 1990 | 20 | 33 | 19 | 15 | — | — | — |
| 1991 | 21 | 36 | 14 | 15 | — | — | — |
| 1992 | 22 | 72 | 32 | 35 | — | — | — |

=== Race podiums ===
| Season | Date | Location | Discipline | Position |
|---|---|---|---|---|
| 1989 | 16 December 1988 | Altenmarkt-Zauchensee, Austria | Slalom | 2nd |
