= Marlis Spescha =

Swiss alpine skier (born 1967)

Marlis Spescha (born 20 April 1967) is a retired Swiss alpine skier who competed in the 1992 Winter Olympics.
