= Vreni Schneider =

Swiss alpine skier

Personal information
- Born: 26 November 1964 (age 61) Elm, Glarus, Switzerland
- Height: 1.70 m (5 ft 7 in)

Skiing career
- Sport: Alpine skiing
- Club: SC Elm
- Retired: 1995
- Disciplines: Technical Events
- World Cup debut: 1984

Olympics
- Teams: 3
- Medals: 5 (3 gold)

World Championships
- Teams: 4
- Medals: 6 (3 gold)

World Cup
- Seasons: 12
- Wins: 55
- Podiums: 101
- Overall titles: 3
- Discipline titles: 11
Medal record
Women's alpine skiing
Representing Switzerland
World Cup race podiums
Event	1st	2nd	3rd
Slalom	34	10	3
Giant slalom	20	14	12
Downhill	0	0	1
Super-G	0	0	2
Combined	1	4	0
Total	55	28	18
International competitions
Event	1st	2nd	3rd
Olympic Games	3	1	1
World Championships	3	2	1
Total	6	3	2
Olympic Games
Gold medal – first place	1994 Lillehammer	Slalom
Gold medal – first place	1988 Calgary	Slalom
Gold medal – first place	1988 Calgary	Giant slalom
Silver medal – second place	1994 Lillehammer	Combined
Bronze medal – third place	1994 Lillehammer	Giant slalom
Alpine World Ski Championships
Gold medal – first place	1987 Crans Montana	Giant slalom
Gold medal – first place	1989 Vail	Giant slalom
Gold medal – first place	1991 Saalbach	Slalom
Silver medal – second place	1989 Vail	Slalom
Silver medal – second place	1989 Vail	Combined
Bronze medal – third place	1991 Saalbach	Combined

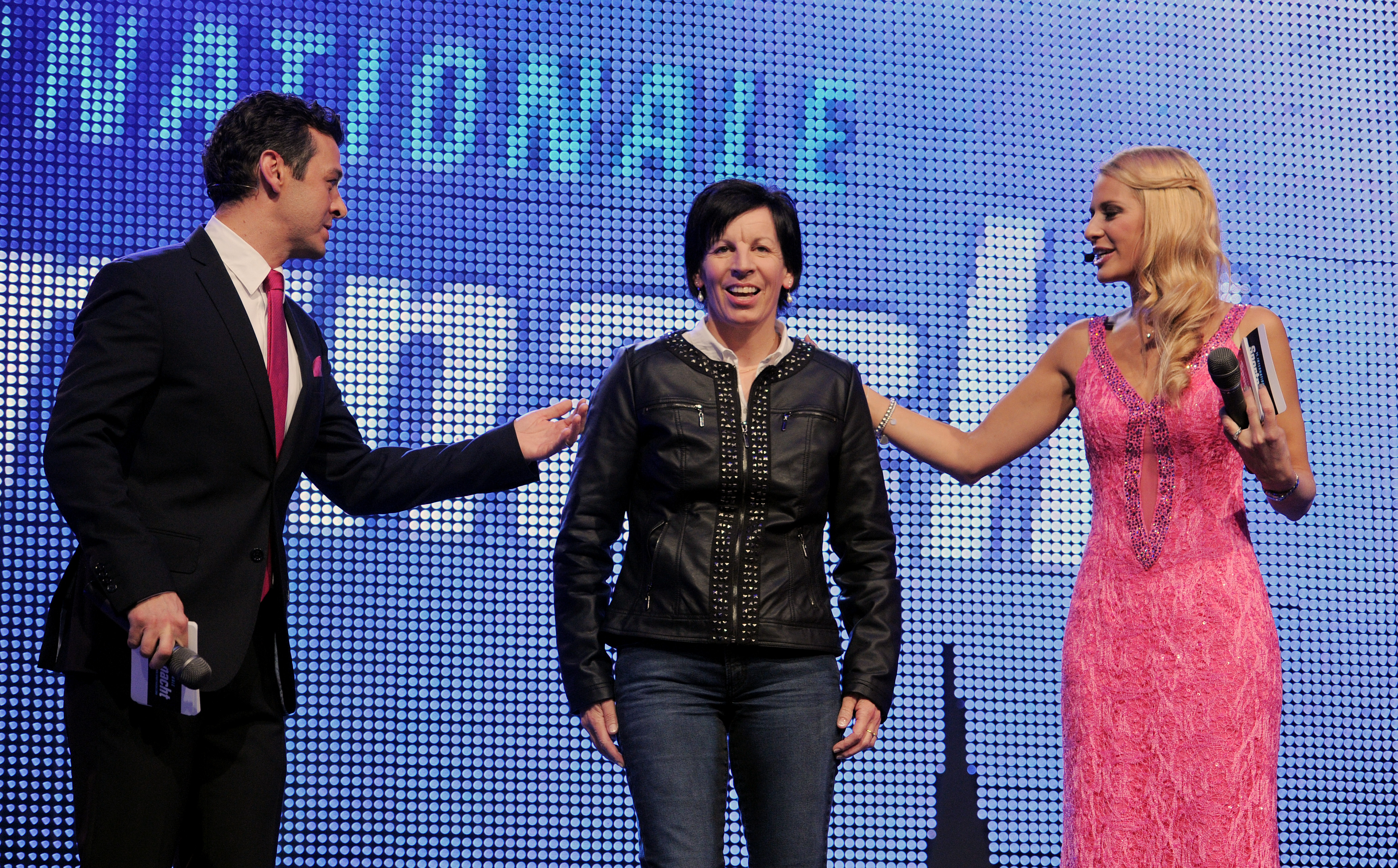
Vreni Schneider at Internationale Sportnacht Davos.

Verena "Vreni" Schneider (born 26 November 1964) is a retired ski racer from Switzerland. She is the most successful alpine ski racer of her country, the fourth most successful female ski racer ever (after Lindsey Vonn, Annemarie Moser-Pröll and Mikaela Shiffrin) and was voted "Swiss Sportswoman of the Century".

== Early life ==
Schneider was born in Elm, the daughter of a shoemaker. Her mother died of cancer when Schneider was a teenager: as a result she put her ski career on hold and dropped out of school to look after the family home.

== Racing career ==
Schneider made her World Cup debut at the age of 20. Schneider won the overall alpine skiing World Cup three times and eleven discipline World Cups in Slalom and Giant slalom, along with 55 World Cup races (number four all-time among women to Moser-Pröll, Vonn and Shiffrin). She also won five medals at the Winter Olympics including 3 golds (Slalom and giant slalom at Calgary in 1988 and Slalom at Lillehammer in 1994), and six medals at the World Championships including 3 more golds (Giant slalom at Crans-Montana in 1987 and Vail in 1989; Slalom at Saalbach in 1991).

During the 1988–89 season she won 14 World Cup races, a record for single season wins that stood until Shiffrin beat that record in the 2018–19 season.

In April 1995, after eleven successful seasons, she announced her retirement. Today she runs a ski and snowboard school in her home village of Elm as well as a sport equipment shop in Glarus.

Vreni Schneider is praised in the Half Man Half Biscuit song 'Uffington Wassail' thus: "Vreni Schneider – you’re my downhill lady! Vreni Schneider – you’re the queen of the slopes!" The song is on the album Trouble Over Bridgwater from the year 2000.

== World Cup results ==
=== Season titles ===
- 14 titles – (3 overall, 6 Slalom, 5 Giant slalom)

Season	
Season	Discipline
1986	Giant slalom
1987	Giant slalom
1989	Overall
1989	Slalom
1989	Giant slalom
1990	Slalom
1991	Giant slalom
1992	Slalom
1993	Slalom
1994	Overall
1994	Slalom
1995	Overall
1995	Slalom
1995	Giant slalom

=== Season standings ===
Season
Season	Age	Overall	Slalom	Giant slalom	Super-G	Downhill	Combined
1985	20	9	22	3	—	—	17
1986	21	3	7	1	14	—	5
1987	22	2	4	1	6	14	2
1988	23	5	2	3	22	—	5
1989	24	1	1	1	17	—	3
1990	25	6	1	5	25	—	—
1991	26	3	5	1	—	—	—
1992	27	4	1	2	—	—	—
1993	28	6	1	12	—	—	—
1994	29	1	1	2	19	15	5
1995	30	1	1	1	25	23	2

=== Race victories ===
	Total	Slalom	Giant slalom	Downhill	Super-G	Combined	Parallel
Wins	55	34	20	0	0	1	0
Podiums	101	47	46	1	2	5	0

Season
Season	Date	Location	Discipline
1985; 2 victories (2 GS)	17 December 1984	Santa Caterina, Italy	Giant slalom
1985; 2 victories (2 GS)	17 March 1985	Waterville Valley, United States	Giant slalom
1986; 3 victories (3 GS)	6 January 1986	(Socialist Federal Republic of Yugoslavia) Maribor, Yugoslavia	Giant slalom
1986; 3 victories (3 GS)	19 January 1986	Oberstaufen, Germany	Giant slalom
1986; 3 victories (3 GS)	20 March 1986	Waterville Valley, United States	Giant slalom
1987; 6 victories (2 SL, 4 GS)	6 December 1986	Waterville Valley, United States	Giant slalom
1987; 6 victories (2 SL, 4 GS)	17 December 1986	Courmayeur, Italy	Slalom
1987; 6 victories (2 SL, 4 GS)	5 January 1987	Saalbach-Hinterglemm, Austria	Giant slalom
1987; 6 victories (2 SL, 4 GS)	13 February 1987	Megève, France	Giant slalom
1987; 6 victories (2 SL, 4 GS)	14 February 1987	Saint-Gervais-les-Bains, France	Slalom
1987; 6 victories (2 SL, 4 GS)	22 March 1987	(Socialist Federal Republic of Yugoslavia) Sarajevo, Yugoslavia	Giant slalom
1988; 2 victories (1 SL, 1 GS)	5 January 1988	Tignes, France	Giant slalom
1988; 2 victories (1 SL, 1 GS)	24 January 1988	Bad Gastein, Austria	Slalom
1989; 14 victories (7 SL, 6 GS, 1 AC)	28 November 1988	Les Menuires, France	Giant slalom
1989; 14 victories (7 SL, 6 GS, 1 AC)	16 December 1988	Altenmarkt-Zauchensee, Austria	Slalom
1989; 14 victories (7 SL, 6 GS, 1 AC)	16 December 1988	Altenmarkt-Zauchensee, Austria	Combined
1989; 14 victories (7 SL, 6 GS, 1 AC)	18 December 1988	Val Zoldana, Italy	Giant slalom
1989; 14 victories (7 SL, 6 GS, 1 AC)	20 December 1988	Courmayeur, Italy	Slalom
1989; 14 victories (7 SL, 6 GS, 1 AC)	3 January 1989	(Socialist Federal Republic of Yugoslavia) Maribor, Yugoslavia	Slalom
1989; 14 victories (7 SL, 6 GS, 1 AC)	6 January 1989	Schwarzenberg, Austria	Giant slalom
1989; 14 victories (7 SL, 6 GS, 1 AC)	7 January 1989	Schwarzenberg, Austria	Giant slalom
1989; 14 victories (7 SL, 6 GS, 1 AC)	8 January 1989	Mellau, Austria	Slalom
1989; 14 victories (7 SL, 6 GS, 1 AC)	15 January 1989	Grindelwald, Switzerland	Slalom
1989; 14 victories (7 SL, 6 GS, 1 AC)	21 January 1989	Tignes, France	Giant slalom
1989; 14 victories (7 SL, 6 GS, 1 AC)	3 March 1989	Furano, Japan	Slalom
1989; 14 victories (7 SL, 6 GS, 1 AC)	8 March 1989	Shigakogen, Japan	Giant slalom
1989; 14 victories (7 SL, 6 GS, 1 AC)	10 March 1989	Shigakogen, Japan	Slalom
1990; 5 victories (5 SL)	25 November 1989	Park City, United States	Slalom
1990; 5 victories (5 SL)	6 January 1990	Piancavallo, Italy	Slalom
1990; 5 victories (5 SL)	9 January 1990	Hinterstoder, Austria	Slalom
1990; 5 victories (5 SL)	21 January 1990	(Socialist Federal Republic of Yugoslavia) Maribor, Yugoslavia	Slalom
1990; 5 victories (5 SL)	18 March 1990	Åre, Sweden	Slalom
1991; 3 victories (1 SL, 2 GS)	11 January 1991	(Socialist Federal Republic of Yugoslavia) Kranjska Gora, Yugoslavia	Giant slalom
1991; 3 victories (1 SL, 2 GS)	11 March 1991	Lake Louise, Canada	Slalom
1991; 3 victories (1 SL, 2 GS)	17 March 1991	Vail, United States	Giant slalom
1992; 5 victories (3 SL, 2 GS)	30 November 1991	Lech, Austria	Slalom
1992; 5 victories (3 SL, 2 GS)	8 December 1991	Santa Caterina, Italy	Giant slalom
1992; 5 victories (3 SL, 2 GS)	5 January 1992	Oberstaufen, Germany	Giant slalom
1992; 5 victories (3 SL, 2 GS)	18 January 1992	Maribor, Slovenia	Slalom
1992; 5 victories (3 SL, 2 GS)	29 February 1992	Narvik, Norway	Slalom
1993; 4 victories (4 SL)	6 January 1993	Maribor, Slovenia	Slalom
1993; 4 victories (4 SL)	17 January 1993	Cortina d'Ampezzo, Italy	Slalom
1993; 4 victories (4 SL)	19 March 1993	Vemdalen, Sweden	Slalom
1993; 4 victories (4 SL)	28 March 1993	Åre, Sweden	Slalom
1994; 7 victories (7 SL)	28 November 1993	Santa Caterina, Italy	Slalom
1994; 7 victories (7 SL)	19 December 1993	St Anton, Austria	Slalom
1994; 7 victories (7 SL)	9 January 1994	Altenmarkt-Zauchensee, Austria	Slalom
1994; 7 victories (7 SL)	23 January 1994	Maribor, Slovenia	Slalom
1994; 7 victories (7 SL)	5 February 1994	Sierra Nevada, Spain	Slalom
1994; 7 victories (7 SL)	10 March 1994	Mammoth Mountain, United States	Slalom
1994; 7 victories (7 SL)	20 March 1994	Vail, United States	Slalom
1995; 4 victories (4 SL)	27 November 1994	Park City, United States	Slalom
1995; 4 victories (4 SL)	18 December 1994	Sestriere, Italy	Slalom
1995; 4 victories (4 SL)	26 February 1995	Maribor, Slovenia	Slalom
1995; 4 victories (4 SL)	19 March 1995	Bormio, Italy	Slalom

== World Championship results ==
Year
Year	Age	Slalom	Giant slalom	Super-G	Downhill	Combined
1985	20	—	12	—N/a	—	—
1987	22	—	1	4	—	4
1989	24	2	1	—	—	2
1991	26	1	7	—	—	3

== Olympic results ==
Year
Year	Age	Slalom	Giant slalom	Super-G	Downhill	Combined
1988	23	1	1	—	—	DNF2
1992	27	7	DNF1	—	—	—
1994	29	1	3	—	33	2

Awards
Preceded by Maria Walliser	Swiss Sportswoman of the Year; 1988–1989	Succeeded by Anita Protti
Preceded by Anita Protti	Swiss Sportswoman of the Year; 1991	Succeeded by Conny Kissling
Preceded by Manuela Maleeva	Swiss Sportswoman of the Year; 1994–1995	Succeeded by Barbara Heeb
