= Gabriela Zingre-Graf =

Swiss alpine skier (born 1970)

Gabriela "Gabi" Zingre-Graf (born 5 August 1970 in Gstaad) is a Swiss former alpine skier who competed in the 1994 Winter Olympics.
