= Lesley Beck =

British alpine skier (born 1964)

- Born: 10 July 1964 (age 60); Glasgow, Scotland
- Occupation: Alpine Skier

Lesley Beck (born 10 July 1964 in Glasgow) is a British former alpine skier who competed in the 1984 Winter Olympics and in the 1988 Winter Olympics.

Beck finished in 10th place in the women's slalom at the 1987 Alpine World Ski Championships. Her height is 152 cm. She is affiliated to the Bearsden Ski Club in Glasgow.
