= Pascaline Freiher =

French alpine skier (born 1966)

Pascaline Freiher (born 11 January 1966 in Megève) is a French former alpine skier who competed in the 1988 Winter Olympics.
