= Jolanda Kindle =

Liechtenstein alpine skier (born 1965)

Jolanda Kindle (born 5 May 1965) is a Liechtensteiner former alpine skier who competed in the 1984 Winter Olympics and in the 1988 Winter Olympics.
