= Camilla Nilsson =

Swedish alpine skier

Personal information
- Born: 3 August 1967 (age 58) Östersund, Sweden
- Height: 1.67 m (5 ft 6 in)

Skiing career
- Sport: Alpine skiing
- Retired: 1990
- World Cup debut: 1983

World Cup
- Seasons: 8
- Wins: 1
- Podiums: 2
Medal record
Women's alpine skiing
Representing Sweden
World Cup race podiums
| Event | 1st | 2nd | 3rd |
|---|---|---|---|
| Slalom | 1 | 1 | 0 |

Camilla Nilsson (born 3 August 1967) is a Swedish former alpine skier who competed at the 1988 Winter Olympics.

== Career ==
During her career, she has achieved 26 results among the top 10 (2 podiums) in the World Cup. On 4 January 1987, she won a women's slalom skiing competition during FIS Alpine Skiing World Cup competitions at Maribor in Slovenia, Yugoslavia, making her the first Swedish woman to win a FIS Alpine Skiing World Cup competition.

== World Cup competition victories ==
| Date | Location | Race type |
|---|---|---|
| 4 January 1987 | Maribor, Slovenia, Yugoslavia | Slalom |
