= Christine von Grünigen =

Swiss alpine skier (born 1964)

Christine von Grünigen (born 25 March 1964) is a Swiss former alpine skier who competed in the 1992 Winter Olympics and 1994 Winter Olympics. She is the sister of fellow former alpine skier Michael von Grünigen.
