= Ida Ladstätter =

Austrian alpine skier

Personal information
- Nationality: (Austria)
- Born: 13 February 1965 (age 61) Sankt Jakob in Defereggen, Tyrol, Austria

Sport
- Sport: Skiing

Ida Ladstätter (born 13 February 1965 in Sankt Jakob in Defereggen) is a retired Austrian alpine skier who competed in the 1988 Winter Olympics.
