= Ingrid Salvenmoser =

Austrian alpine skier (born 1967)

Medal record

Representing Austria

World Championships

Women's alpine skiing
Bronze medal – third place	1991 Saalbach-Hinterglemm	Slalom

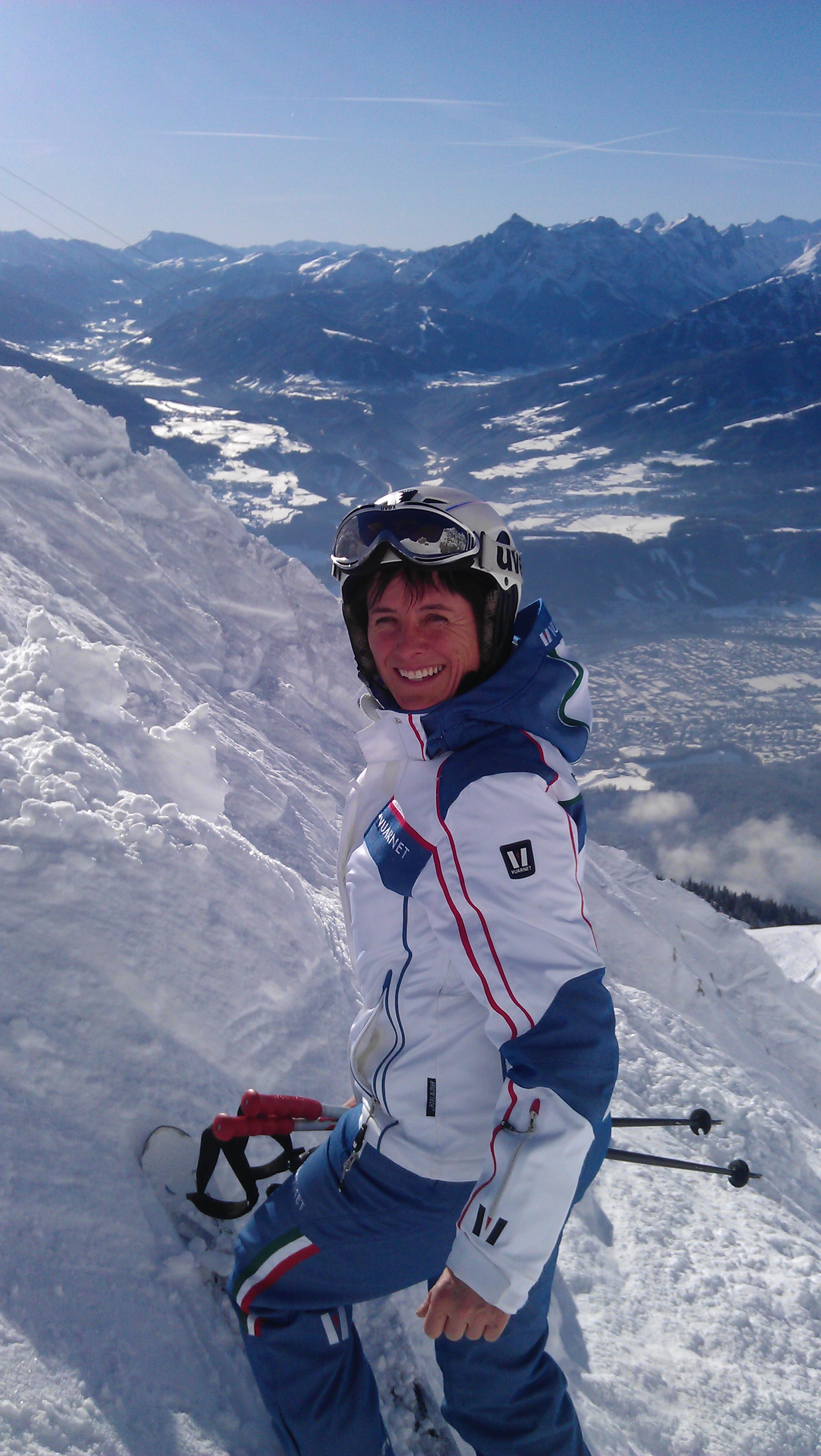
Ingrid Salvenmoser

Ingrid Salvenmoser (born 28 March 1967 in Scheffau am Wilden Kaiser) is a former alpine skier from Austria. Her ski career in the Austrian National Ski Team started in the 1983/84 season and she debuted in the World Cup in the 1984/85 season. In total she took part in 196 World Cup races in Giant Slalom and Slalom. She was three times ranked top 3 and several times top 10.

She took part in 6 World Championships and the 1998 Winter Olympic Games. Her best championship result was the 3rd place in Slalom in the 1991 World Championship in Saalbach-Hinterglemm.

She stopped racing in 2001 and since 2002 she is running a ski school in Scheffau in the big ski area Skiwelt Wilder Kaiser. She also has a 9-year-old son and is living in a farm house at 1000 m altitude.
