= Monika Maierhofer =

Austrian alpine skier (born 1967)

Monika Maierhofer (born 10 January 1967 in Trofaiach) is an Austrian former alpine skier who competed in the 1992 Winter Olympics and 1994 Winter Olympics.
