= Beatrice Gafner =

Swiss alpine skier (born 1964)

Beatrice Gafner (born 19 November 1964 in Beatenberg) is a Swiss former alpine skier who competed in the 1988 Winter Olympics.
