= Michela Figini =

Swiss alpine skier (born 1966)

Personal information
- Born: 7 April 1966 (age 60) Prato, Ticino, Switzerland
- Height: 168 cm (5 ft 6 in)

Skiing career
- Sport: Alpine skiing
- Club: SCO Club Airolo
- Retired: May 1990 (age 24)
- Disciplines: Speed events
- World Cup debut: 21 January 1983 (age 16)

Olympics
- Teams: 2 – (1984, 1988)
- Medals: 2 (1 gold)

World Championships
- Teams: 3 – (1985, 1987, 1989)
- Medals: 3 (1 gold)

World Cup
- Seasons: 7 – (1983–1990)
- Wins: 26
- Podiums: 46
- Overall titles: 2 – (1985, 1988)
- Discipline titles: 5 – (4 DH, 1 SG)
Medal record
Women's alpine skiing
Representing Switzerland
World Cup race podiums
Event	1st	2nd	3rd
Giant slalom	2	2	4
Downhill	17	5	3
Super-G	3	2	3
Combined	4	0	1
Total	26	9	11
Olympic Games
Gold medal – first place	1984 Sarajevo	Downhill
Silver medal – second place	1988 Calgary	Super-G
World Championships
Gold medal – first place	1985 Bormio	Downhill
Silver medal – second place	1987 Crans-Montana	Downhill
Silver medal – second place	1987 Crans-Montana	Super-G

Michela Figini (born 7 April 1966) is a former World Cup alpine ski racer from Switzerland. She is an Olympic, World Cup and world champion.

== Career ==
Figini made her World Cup debut at age 16 in January 1983 and won the downhill at the 1984 Winter Olympics in Sarajevo at age 17. Through 2014, she remains the youngest Olympic champion in alpine skiing. She won the downhill the following year at the 1985 World Championships. She also came second in the downhill at the 1987 World Championships, and won a silver medal in the super-G at the 1988 Winter Olympics in Calgary.

Figini won 26 World Cup races and overall titles in 1985 and 1988, as well as four season titles in downhill, one in Super-G.

== Personal ==
Figini retired in 1990 and later worked as a television commentator. She has two children from her first marriage with the former Italian alpine ski racer Ivano Camozzi.

== World Cup results ==
=== Season titles ===
7 titles: (2 overall, 4 DH, 1 SG)

Season	Discipline
1985	Overall
1985	Downhill
1987	Downhill
1988	Overall
1988	Downhill
1988	Super-G
1989	Downhill

=== Season standings ===
Season	Age	Overall	Slalom	Giant slalom	Super-G	Downhill	Combined
1983	16	26	—	15	not awarded (w/ GS)	24	16
1984	17	5	—	6	not awarded (w/ GS)	5	5
1985	18	1	28	2	not awarded (w/ GS)	1	2
1986	19	6	—	6	10	6	3
1987	20	5	—	5	11	1	—
1988	21	1	—	10	1	1	14
1989	22	3	—	17	5	1	5
1990	23	8	—	34	13	3	—

=== Race victories ===
- 26 wins – (17 DH, 3 SG, 2 GS, 4 K)

Season	Date	Location	Race
1984	28 January 1984	Megève, France	Downhill
1984	29 January 1984	Saint-Gervais, France	Combined
1985	4 January 1985	(Socialist Federal Republic of Yugoslavia) Maribor, Yugoslavia	Giant slalom
1985	9 January 1985	Santa Caterina, Italy	Combined
1985	9 January 1985	Bad Kleinkirchheim, Austria	Downhill
1985	10 January 1985	Bad Kleinkirchheim, Austria	Downhill
1985	13 January 1985	Pfronten, West Germany	Super-G
1985	20 January 1985	Saint-Gervais, France	Downhill
1985	21 January 1985	Saint-Gervais, France	Giant slalom
1985	8 March 1985	Banff, Canada	Combined
1986	21 December 1985	(Socialist Federal Republic of Yugoslavia) Maribor, Yugoslavia	Combined
1986	12 January 1986	Val d'Isère, France	Downhill
1987	16 January 1987	Pfronten, West Germany	Downhill
1987	8 March 1987	Calgary, Canada	Downhill
1988	11 December 1987	Leukerbad, Switzerland	Downhill
1988	12 December 1987	Leukerbad, Switzerland	Super-G
1988	14 January 1988	Zinal, Switzerland	Downhill
1988	12 March 1988	Rossland, Canada	Downhill
1988	13 March 1988	Rossland, Canada	Super-G
1989	2 December 1988	Val-d'Isère, France	Downhill
1989	12 January 1989	Grindelwald, Switzerland	Downhill
1989	13 January 1989	Grindelwald, Switzerland	Downhill
1989	7 February 1989	Lake Louise, Canada	Downhill
1989	18 February 1989	Lake Louise, Canada	Downhill
1989	25 February 1989	(United States) Steamboat Springs, USA	Downhill
1990	27 January 1990	Santa Caterina, Italy	Downhill

== World Championship results ==
Year	Age	Slalom	Giant slalom	Super-G	Downhill	Combined
1985	18	—	15	—	1	—
1987	20	—	4	2	2	6
1989	22	—	—	5	8	—

== Olympic results ==
Year	Age	Slalom	Giant slalom	Super-G	Downhill	Combined
1984	17	—	12	not run	1	not run
1988	21	—	—	2	9	—

== See also ==
- List of FIS Alpine Ski World Cup women's race winners

Awards
Preceded by Doris de Agostini	Swiss Sportswoman of the Year; 1984–1985	Succeeded by Maria Walliser
