= Barbara Sadleder =

Austrian alpine skier (born 1967)

Barbara Sadleder (born 17 June 1967 in Steyr) is an Austrian retired alpine skier who competed in the 1992 Winter Olympics, where she finished 7th in the women's downhill and 15th in the women's super-G.
