= Christina Meier-Höck =

German alpine skier (born 1966)

Christina Meier-Höck (born 20 February 1966 in Rottach-Egern) is a German former alpine skier who competed in the 1988 Winter Olympics, 1992 Winter Olympics, and 1994 Winter Olympics.
