= Ulrike Stanggassinger =

German alpine skier (1968–2019)

Ulrike Stanggassinger (22 February 1968 in Berchtesgaden – 1 July 2019 in Berchtesgaden) was a German former alpine skier who competed in the 1988 Winter Olympics.
