= Karen Percy =

Canadian alpine skier (born 1966)

Personal information
- Born: October 10, 1966 (age 60) Banff, Alberta, Canada
- Years active: 1979–1990

Sport
- Country: Canada
- Sport: Alpine skiing
Medal record
Women's Alpine skiing
Olympic Games
Bronze medal – third place	1988 Calgary	Downhill
Bronze medal – third place	1988 Calgary	Super-G
World Championships
Silver medal – second place	1989 Vail	Downhill

Karen Percy Lowe (born October 10, 1966) is a Canadian former alpine skier. She was born in Banff, Alberta. She won two bronze medals in skiing at the 1988 Calgary Winter Olympics, where she was Canada's flag bearer in the closing ceremony. Until her retirement from the National team in August 1990, she competed in 107 races on the World Cup circuit with 25-top 10 finishes, four World Championships including two Junior World Championships, and 7 consecutive Canadian National Championships from 1983 to 1989.

== Honours ==
In 1988, she was a recipient of Canada's highest award when she became a Member of the Order of Canada, followed, in 1989, by an Olympic Champion award at The Tribute to the Champions.

== Personal life ==
Percy is married to former Edmonton Oilers player, and current Director of Hockey for the Edmonton Oilers, Kevin Lowe. Their son Keegan is currently playing with Växjö Lakers in the Swedish Hockey League (SHL).
