= Alpine skiing at the 1994 Winter Olympics – Women's downhill =

Women's Downhill at the XVII Olympic Winter Games
- Alpine skiing
- Venue: Kvitfjell
- Date: February 19, 1994
- Competitors: 48 from 19 nations
- Winning time: 1:35.93

Medalists
1st place, gold medalist(s)		Katja Seizinger	Germany
2nd place, silver medalist(s)		Picabo Street	United States
3rd place, bronze medalist(s)		Isolde Kostner	Italy

Women's Downhill
- Location: Kvitfjell
- Vertical: 708 m (2,323 ft)
- Top elevation: 890 m (2,920 ft)
- Base elevation: 182 m (597 ft)

The Women's Downhill competition of the Lillehammer 1994 Olympics was held at Kvitfjell on Saturday, 19 February.

The defending world champion was Kate Pace Lindsay of Canada, while Germany's Katja Seizinger was the defending World Cup downhill champion and led the current season.

Seizinger won the gold medal, Picabo Street of the United States took the silver, and Isolde Kostner of Italy was the bronze medalist.

The course started at an elevation of 890 m (2,920 ft) above sea level with a vertical drop of 708 m (2,323 ft) and a course length of 2.641 km (1.64 mi). Seizinger's winning time was 95.93 seconds, yielding an average course speed of 99.110 km/h (61.6 mph), with an average vertical descent rate of 7.380 m/s (24.2 ft/s).

== Results ==
The race was started at 11:00 local time, (UTC +1). At the starting gate, the skies were clear, the temperature was −6.0 °C (21 °F), and the snow condition was hard; the temperature at the finish was lower, at −14.0 °C (7 °F).

Rank	Bib	Name	Country	Time	Difference
1st place, gold medalist(s)	3	Katja Seizinger	Germany	1:35.93	—
2nd place, silver medalist(s)	8	Picabo Street	United States	1:36.59	+0.66
3rd place, bronze medalist(s)	12	Isolde Kostner	Italy	1:36.85	+0.92
4	16	Martina Ertl	Germany	1:37.10	+1.17
5	2	Kate Pace Lindsay	Canada	1:37.17	+1.24
6	9	Mélanie Suchet	France	1:37.34	+1.41
7	4	Hilary Lindh	United States	1:37.44	+1.51
8	7	Varvara Zelenskaya	Russia	1:37.48	+1.55
9	23	Pernilla Wiberg	Sweden	1:37.61	+1.68
10	35	Katja Koren	Slovenia	1:37.69	+1.76
11	17	Jeanette Lunde	Norway	1:37.80	+1.87
12	1	Miriam Vogt	Germany	1:37.86	+1.93
13	33	Florence Masnada	France	1:37.92	+1.99
14	6	Veronika Stallmaier	Austria	1:37.94	+2.01
14	31	Morena Gallizio	Italy	1:37.94	+2.01
16	32	Alenka Dovžan	Slovenia	1:38.07	+2.14
17	20	Svetlana Gladysheva	Russia	1:38.10	+2.17
18	25	Katrin Gutensohn	Germany	1:38.14	+2.21
19	11	Kerrin Lee-Gartner	Canada	1:38.22	+2.29
20	29	Megan Gerety	United States	1:38.24	+2.31
21	26	Emi Kawabata	Japan	1:38.29	+2.36
22	14	Heidi Zurbriggen	Switzerland	1:38.46	+2.53
23	37	Špela Pretnar	Slovenia	1:38.50	+2.57
24	36	Olga Vedyacheva	Kazakhstan	1:38.58	+2.65
25	19	Barbara Merlin	Italy	1:38.65	+2.72
26	10	Régine Cavagnoud	France	1:38.69	+2.76
27	27	Krista Schmidinger	United States	1:38.76	+2.83
28	13	Heidi Zeller-Bähler	Switzerland	1:38.78	+2.85
29	18	Nathalie Bouvier	France	1:38.85	+2.92
30	30	Michelle Ruthven	Canada	1:38.88	+2.95
31	5	Anja Haas	Austria	1:38.98	+3.05
32	34	Lucia Medzihradská	Slovakia	1:39.22	+3.29
33	28	Vreni Schneider	Switzerland	1:39.35	+3.42
34	21	Erika Hansson	Sweden	1:39.40	+3.47
35	39	Nataliya Buga	Russia	1:40.93	+5.00
36	43	Mihaela Fera	Romania	1:41.07	+5.14
37	40	Olha Lohinova	Ukraine	1:43.07	+7.14
38	38	Mira Golub	Russia	1:43.21	+7.28
39	44	Szvetlana Keszthelyi	Hungary	1:43.33	+7.40
40	42	Maria Zaruc	Romania	1:45.73	+9.80
41	48	Francisca Steverlynck	Argentina	1:46.76	+10.83
42	46	Khrystyna Podrushna	Ukraine	1:46.96	+11.03
43	45	Gabriela Quijano	Argentina	1:49.26	+13.33
44	47	Jennifer Taylor	Argentina	1:49.53	+13.60
-	15	Bibiana Perez	Italy	DNF	-
-	22	Renate Götschl	Austria	DNF	-
-	24	Ingrid Stöckl	Austria	DNF	-
-	41	Véronique Dugailly	Belgium	DNF	-
