= Alpine skiing at the 1994 Winter Olympics – Women's combined =

Women's combined at the XVII Olympic Winter Games
- Alpine skiing
- Venue: Kvitfjell and Hafjell
- Date: February 20–21, 1994
- Competitors: 41 from 20 nations
- Winning time: 3:05.16

Medalists
1st place, gold medalist(s)		Pernilla Wiberg	Sweden
2nd place, silver medalist(s)		Vreni Schneider	Switzerland
3rd place, bronze medalist(s)		Alenka Dovžan	Slovenia

The Women's combined competition of the Lillehammer 1994 Olympics was held at Kvitfjell and Hafjell.

The defending world champion was Miriam Vogt of Germany, while Austria's Anita Wachter was the defending World Cup combined champion, and Pernilla Wiberg was the 1994 World Cup.

== Results ==
Rank	Bib	Name	Country	Downhill	Slalom 1	Slalom 2	Total	Difference
1st place, gold medalist(s)	2	Pernilla Wiberg	Sweden	1:28.70	0:49.35	0:47.11	3:05.16	-
2nd place, silver medalist(s)	1	Vreni Schneider	Switzerland	1:28.91	0:49.75	0:46.63	3:05.29	+0.13
3rd place, bronze medalist(s)	9	Alenka Dovžan	Slovenia	1:28.67	0:50.01	0:47.96	3:06.64	+1.48
4	3	Morena Gallizio	Italy	1:28.71	0:49.94	0:48.06	3:06.71	+1.55
5	5	Martina Ertl	Germany	1:29.38	0:50.98	0:48.42	3:08.78	+3.62
6	8	Katja Koren	Slovenia	1:30.59	0:50.28	0:48.72	3:09.59	+4.43
7	6	Florence Masnada	France	1:29.11	0:51.86	0:49.05	3:10.02	+4.86
8	14	Hilde Gerg	Germany	1:29.02	0:52.14	0:48.94	3:10.10	+4.94
9	13	Miriam Vogt	Germany	1:29.61	0:51.24	0:49.29	3:10.14	+4.98
10	19	Picabo Street	United States	1:28.19	0:52.59	0:49.37	3:10.15	+4.99
11	12	Erika Hansson	Sweden	1:29.93	0:51.12	0:49.12	3:10.17	+5.01
12	11	Bibiana Perez	Italy	1:29.15	0:52.78	0:48.71	3:10.64	+5.48
13	7	Lucia Medzihradská	Slovakia	1:30.70	0:52.90	0:48.77	3:12.37	+7.21
14	4	Urška Hrovat	Slovenia	1:34.60	0:51.72	0:48.43	3:14.75	+9.59
15	26	Jeanette Lunde	Norway	1:29.31	0:55.11	0:51.55	3:15.97	+10.81
16	21	Barbara Merlin	Italy	1:29.67	0:55.79	0:51.85	3:17.31	+12.15
17	30	Emi Kawabata	Japan	1:29.00	0:56.50	0:52.72	3:18.22	+13.06
18	27	Olha Lohinova	Ukraine	1:33.29	0:54.26	0:51.88	3:19.43	+14.27
19	34	Olga Vedyacheva	Kazakhstan	1:29.74	0:56.89	0:54.24	3:20.87	+15.71
20	29	Mihaela Fera	Romania	1:31.69	0:59.19	0:55.22	3:26.10	+20.94
21	33	Francisca Steverlynck	Argentina	1:37.10	0:58.98	0:56.56	3:32.64	+27.48
22	28	Gabriela Quijano	Argentina	1:39.88	0:57.87	0:55.76	3:33.51	+28.35
23	35	Véronique Dugailly	Belgium	1:37.22	1:02.97	0:57.90	3:38.09	+32.93
24	15	Monique Pelletier	United States	1:30.36	1:19.01	0:49.42	3:38.79	+33.63
25	36	Jennifer Taylor	Argentina	1:39.18	1:06.47	0:58.62	3:44.27	+39.11
-	7	Isolde Kostner	Italy	1:28.52	0:54.04	DNF	-	-
-	34	Zali Steggall	Australia	1:33.46	0:52.34	DNF	-	-
-	6	Warvara Zelenskaya	Russia	1:29.66	DNS	-	-	-
-	12	Michelle McKendry-Ruthven	Canada	1:29.92	DNS	-	-	-
-	20	Mira Golub	Russia	1:33.80	DNS	-	-	-
-	23	Nataliya Buga	Russia	1:32.01	DNS	-	-	-
-	3	Katja Seizinger	Germany	1:27.28	DNF	-	-	-
-	5	Anja Haas	Austria	1:30.01	DNF	-	-	-
-	11	Svetlana Gladishiva	Russia	1:29.45	DNF	-	-	-
-	29	Špela Pretnar	Slovenia	1:29.91	DNF	-	-	-
-	36	Szvetlana Keszthelyi	Hungary	1:32.99	DNF	-	-	-
-	38	Khrystyna Podrushna	Ukraine	1:35.21	DNF	-	-	-
-	41	Ophélie David	Hungary	1:34.85	DNF	-	-	-
-	13	Ingrid Stöckl	Austria	1:29.97	DQ	-	-	-
-	33	Maria Zaruc	Romania	DNF	-	-	-	-
-	24	Julie Parisien	United States	DQ	-	-	-	-
