= Alpine skiing at the 1994 Winter Olympics – Women's super-G =

Women's Super-G at the XVII Olympic Winter Games
- Alpine skiing
- Venue: Kvitfjell
- Date: 15 February 1994
- Competitors: 55 from 23 nations
- Winning time: 1:22.15

Medalists
1st place, gold medalist(s)		Diann Roffe	United States
2nd place, silver medalist(s)		Svetlana Gladysheva	Russia
3rd place, bronze medalist(s)		Isolde Kostner	Italy

The Women's Super G competition of the Lillehammer 1994 Olympics was held at Kvitfjell.

The defending world champion was Katja Seizinger of Germany, who was also the defending World Cup downhill champion and led the 1994 World Cup.

== Results ==
Rank	Bib	Name	Country	Time	Difference
1st place, gold medalist(s)	1	Diann Roffe	United States	1:22.15	–
2nd place, silver medalist(s)	35	Svetlana Gladysheva	Russia	1:22.44	+0.29
3rd place, bronze medalist(s)	2	Isolde Kostner	Italy	1:22.45	+0.30
4	10	Pernilla Wiberg	Sweden	1:22.67	+0.52
5	17	Morena Gallizio	Italy	1:22.73	+0.58
6	27	Katrin Gutensohn	Germany	1:22.84	+0.69
7	15	Katja Koren	Slovenia	1:22.96	+0.81
8	11	Kerrin Lee-Gartner	Canada	1:22.98	+0.83
9	4	Anita Wachter	Austria	1:23.01	+0.86
10	29	Shannon Nobis	United States	1:23.02	+0.87
11	12	Régine Cavagnoud	France	1:23.13	+0.98
12	31	Kate Pace Lindsay	Canada	1:23.22	+1.07
13	25	Hilary Lindh	United States	1:23.38	+1.23
14	30	Florence Masnada	France	1:23.43	+1.28
15	6	Sylvia Eder	Austria	1:23.51	+1.36
16	16	Heidi Zeller-Bähler	Switzerland	1:23.53	+1.38
17	5	Deborah Compagnoni	Italy	1:23.54	+1.39
18	14	Hilde Gerg	Germany	1:23.63	+1.48
19	9	Carole Merle	France	1:23.72	+1.57
20	33	Mélanie Suchet	France	1:23.74	+1.59
21	21	Varvara Zelenskaya	Russia	1:23.80	+1.65
22	18	Marianne Kjørstad	Norway	1:23.83	+1.68
22	19	Veronika Wallinger-Stallmaier	Austria	1:23.83	+1.68
24	40	Emi Kawabata	Japan	1:23.90	+1.75
25	20	Michelle McKendry-Ruthven	Canada	1:24.13	+1.98
26	32	Urška Hrovat	Slovenia	1:24.49	+2.34
27	36	Erika Hansson	Sweden	1:24.50	+2.35
27	41	Ainhoa Ibarra Astellara	Spain	1:24.50	+2.35
29	42	María José Rienda Contreras	Spain	1:24.65	+2.50
30	23	Stefanie Schuster	Austria	1:24.76	+2.61
31	26	Michaela Gerg-Leitner	Germany	1:25.19	+3.04
32	39	Jeanette Lunde	Norway	1:25.32	+3.17
33	34	Lucia Medzihradská	Slovakia	1:25.57	+3.42
34	43	Nataliya Buga	Russia	1:26.09	+3.94
35	37	Caroline Gedde-Dahl	Norway	1:26.13	+3.98
36	47	Vicky Grau	Andorra	1:26.39	+4.24
37	46	Olga Vedyacheva	Kazakhstan	1:26.66	+4.51
38	44	Mira Golub	Russia	1:27.23	+5.08
39	56	Mihaela Fera	Romania	1:28.47	+6.32
40	45	Olha Lohinova	Ukraine	1:30.00	+7.85
41	52	Szvetlana Keszthelyi	Hungary	1:30.21	+8.06
42	55	Francisca Steverlynck	Argentina	1:32.56	+10.41
43	53	Dominique Ezquerra	Argentina	1:32.71	+10.56
44	51	Gabriela Quijano	Argentina	1:33.45	+11.30
45	54	Carola Calello	Argentina	1:35.87	+13.72
46	57	Karolina Fotiadou	Cyprus	1:43.97	+21.82
	3	Heidi Zurbriggen	Switzerland	DNF	
	7	Katja Seizinger	Germany	DNF	
	8	Bibiana Perez	Italy	DNF	
	13	Alenka Dovžan	Slovenia	DNF	
	22	Chantal Bournissen	Switzerland	DNF	
	24	Megan Gerety	United States	DNF	
	28	Špela Pretnar	Slovenia	DNF	
	38	Birgit Heeb	Liechtenstein	DNF	
	49	Ásta Halldórsdóttir	Iceland	DNF	
	48	Caroline Poussier	Andorra	DNS	
	50	Zali Steggall	Australia	DNS	
