= List of FIS Alpine Ski World Cup women's race winners =

Alpine skiing

This is a list of all female winners in FIS Alpine Ski World Cup from 1967 to present. The list includes all individual races, including the following disciplines: downhill, super-G, giant slalom, slalom, combined and others. It does not include team events.

The three original World Cup disciplines, since 1967, were downhill, giant slalom and slalom. Combined and parallel slalom were introduced in 1975; the latter was replaced by "super combined" in 2006, renamed "alpine combined" in 2015 and was no longer disputed since 2020. Super-G was introduced in 1982.

== Winners ==
active skiers
the first racer to win for their country
racers to win all four major events

#	Name	Country	Seasons	Victories	DH	SG	GS	SL	KB	PSL	PGS	CE	KO
1	Mikaela Shiffrin	United States	2012–active	110	4	5	22	73	1	2	–	3	N/A
2	Lindsey Vonn	United States	2001–active	84	45	28	4	2	5	–	N/A	–	–
3	Annemarie Moser-Pröll	Austria	1969–1980	62	36	N/A	16	3	7	–	N/A	N/A	N/A
4	Vreni Schneider	Switzerland	1984–1995	55	–	–	20	34	1	–	N/A	N/A	N/A
5	Lara Gut-Behrami	Switzerland	2008–2026	48	13	24	10	–	1	–	–	–	N/A
6	Renate Götschl	Austria	1993–2009	46	24	17	–	1	4	–	N/A	N/A	–
7	Anja Pärson	Sweden	1998–2012	42	6	4	11	17	3	–	N/A	–	1
8	Marlies Schild	Austria	2001–2014	37	–	–	1	35	1	–	N/A	–	–
	Federica Brignone	Italy	2010–active	37	2	13	17	–	5	–	–	–	N/A
10	Katja Seizinger	Germany	1989–1998	36	16	16	4	–	–	–	N/A	N/A	N/A
11	Hanni Wenzel	Liechtenstein	1972–1984	33	2	–	12	11	8	–	N/A	N/A	N/A
12	Erika Hess	Switzerland	1978–1987	31	–	–	6	21	4	–	N/A	N/A	N/A
	Petra Vlhová	Slovakia	2013–active	31	–	–	6	22	–	1	1	1	N/A
14	Janica Kostelić	Croatia	1998–2006	30	1	1	2	20	6	–	N/A	N/A	–
15	Sofia Goggia	Italy	2012–active	29	19	10	–	–	–	–	–	–	N/A
16	Maria Höfl-Riesch	Germany	2001–2014	27	11	3	–	9	4	–	N/A	–	–
17	Michela Figini	Switzerland	1983–1990	26	17	3	2	–	4	–	N/A	N/A	N/A
	Tina Maze	Slovenia	1999–2015	26	4	1	14	4	3	–	N/A	–	–
19	Maria Walliser	Switzerland	1980–1990	25	14	3	6	–	2	–	N/A	N/A	N/A
	Michaela Dorfmeister	Austria	1991–2006	25	7	10	8	–	–	–	N/A	N/A	–
21	Marie-Theres Nadig	Switzerland	1971–1981	24	13	N/A	6	–	5	–	N/A	N/A	N/A
	Lise-Marie Morerod	Switzerland	1973–1980	24	–	N/A	14	10	–	–	N/A	N/A	N/A
	Pernilla Wiberg	Sweden	1990–2002	24	2	3	2	14	3	–	N/A	N/A	N/A
24	Carole Merle	France	1981–1994	22	–	12	10	–	–	–	N/A	N/A	N/A
25	Hilde Gerg	Germany	1993–2005	20	7	8	–	1	3	1	N/A	N/A	–
26	Anita Wachter	Austria	1985–2001	19	–	2	14	1	2	–	N/A	N/A	N/A
	Viktoria Rebensburg	Germany	2007–2020	19	1	4	14	–	–	–	–	–	N/A
28	Tamara McKinney	United States	1979–1989	18	–	–	9	9	–	–	N/A	N/A	N/A
29	Petra Kronberger	Austria	1987–1993	16	6	2	3	3	2	–	N/A	N/A	N/A
	Deborah Compagnoni	Italy	1988–1999	16	–	2	13	1	–	–	N/A	N/A	N/A
	Tessa Worley	France	2006–2023	16	–	–	16	–	–	–	–	N/A	–
32	Perrine Pelen	France	1977–1986	15	–	–	–	15	–	–	N/A	N/A	N/A
	Sonja Nef	Switzerland	1993–2006	15	–	–	13	2	–	–	N/A	N/A	–
	Isolde Kostner	Italy	1994–2006	15	12	3	–	–	–	–	N/A	N/A	–
	Anna Veith	Austria	2007–2020	15	–	3	11	–	1	–	–	–	N/A
36	Nancy Greene	Canada	1967–1968	14	3	N/A	8	3	N/A	N/A	N/A	N/A	N/A
	Martina Ertl	Germany	1992–2006	14	–	2	10	2	–	–	N/A	N/A	–
	Alexandra Meissnitzer	Austria	1992–2008	14	2	7	5	–	–	–	N/A	N/A	–
39	Nicole Hosp	Austria	2002–2015	12	–	1	5	5	1	–	N/A	–	–
40	Irene Epple	West Germany	1973–1985	11	1	1	6	–	3	–	N/A	N/A	N/A
	Tanja Poutiainen	Finland	1997–2014	11	–	–	5	6	–	–	N/A	–	–
	Ilka Štuhec	Slovenia	2007–2026	11	7	3	–	–	1	–	–	N/A	–
43	Rosi Mittermaier	West Germany	1967–1976	10	–	N/A	1	8	1	–	N/A	N/A	N/A
	Francoise Macchi	France	1968–1972	10	2	N/A	6	2	N/A	N/A	N/A	N/A	N/A
	Michele Jacot	France	1968–1976	10	1	N/A	6	3	–	–	N/A	N/A	N/A
	Monika Kaserer	Austria	1969–1980	10	–	N/A	8	1	–	1	N/A	N/A	N/A
	Cornelia Hütter	Austria	2013–active	10	5	5	–	–	–	–	–	–	N/A
48	Isabelle Mir	France	1967–1973	9	8	N/A	1	–	N/A	N/A	N/A	N/A	N/A
	Brigitte Oertli	Switzerland	1982–1990	9	1	–	–	1	7	–	N/A	N/A	N/A
	Picabo Street	United States	1986–1997	9	9	–	–	–	–	–	N/A	N/A	N/A
	Kathrin Zettel	Austria	2004–2015	9	–	–	7	2	–	–	N/A	–	N/A
	Tina Weirather	Liechtenstein	2007–2020	9	1	7	1	–	–	–	–	N/A	–
53	Brigitte Totschnig	Austria	1972–1979	8	7	N/A	1	–	–	–	N/A	N/A	N/A
	Doris de Agostini	Switzerland	1976–1983	8	8	N/A	–	–	–	–	N/A	N/A	N/A
	Roswitha Steiner	Austria	1980–1988	8	–	–	–	8	–	–	N/A	N/A	N/A
	Regine Cavagnoud	France	1991–2002	8	3	4	1	–	–	–	N/A	N/A	N/A
	Carole Montillet	France	1992–2006	8	4	4	–	–	–	–	N/A	N/A	–
	Karen Putzer	Italy	1997–2009	8	–	4	4	–	–	–	N/A	N/A	–
	Sara Hector	Sweden	2010–active	8	–	–	8	–	–	–	–	–	N/A
60	Marielle Goitschel	France	1967–1968	7	2	N/A	–	5	N/A	N/A	N/A	N/A	N/A
	Gertrud Gabl	Austria	1967–1972	7	–	N/A	2	5	N/A	N/A	N/A	N/A	N/A
	Britt Lafforgue	France	1968–1973	7	–	N/A	2	5	N/A	N/A	N/A	N/A	N/A
	Ingrid Lafforgue	France	1969–1970	7	–	N/A	1	6	N/A	N/A	N/A	N/A	N/A
	Bernadette Zurbriggen	Switzerland	1972–1980	7	5	N/A	1	–	1	–	N/A	N/A	N/A
	Christa Kinshofer	West Germany	1977–1988	7	–	–	5	1	1	–	N/A	N/A	N/A
	Marina Kiehl	West Germany	1982–1987	7	–	6	1	–	–	–	N/A	N/A	N/A
	Chantal Bournissen	Switzerland	1981–1995	7	6	1	–	–	–	–	N/A	N/A	N/A
	Mateja Svet	Yugoslavia	1984–1990	7	–	–	6	1	–	–	N/A	N/A	N/A
	Elisabeth Görgl	Austria	2003–2017	7	2	3	2	–	–	–	N/A	–	–
	Julia Mancuso	United States	2000–2018	7	3	2	–	–	1	–	N/A	1	–
	Marta Bassino	Italy	2015–active	7	1	–	6	–	–	–	–	–	N/A
	Alice Robinson	New Zealand	2018–active	7	–	1	6	–	–	–	–	–	N/A
73	Christa Zechmeister	West Germany	1973–1980	6	–	N/A	–	6	–	–	N/A	N/A	N/A
	Cindy Nelson	United States	1974–1985	6	3	1	1	–	1	–	N/A	N/A	N/A
	Laurie Graham	Canada	1980–1988	6	5	1	–	–	–	–	N/A	N/A	N/A
	Sabine Ginther	Austria	1989–1993	6	3	–	–	1	2	–	N/A	N/A	N/A
	Špela Pretnar	Slovenia	1992–2003	6	–	–	1	5	–	–	N/A	N/A	–
	Kristina Koznick	United States	1993–2006	6	–	–	–	6	–	–	N/A	N/A	–
	María José Rienda Contreras	Spain	1994–2011	6	–	–	6	–	–	–	N/A	–	–
	Denise Karbon	Italy	1998–2014	6	–	–	6	–	–	–	N/A	–	–
	Corinne Suter	Switzerland	2012–active	6	4	2	–	–	–	–	–	–	N/A
	Emma Aicher	Germany	2021–active	6	2	3	–	1	N/A	N/A	–	N/A	N/A
82	Kiki Cutter	United States	1967–1970	5	–	N/A	1	4	N/A	N/A	N/A	N/A	N/A
	Wiltrud Drexel	Austria	1968–1976	5	5	N/A	–	–	–	–	N/A	N/A	N/A
	Danièle Debernard	France	1971–1979	5	–	N/A	2	3	–	–	N/A	N/A	N/A
	Maria Epple	West Germany	1976–1986	5	–	–	4	1	–	–	N/A	N/A	N/A
	Christin Cooper	United States	1977–1984	5	–	–	1	2	2	–	N/A	N/A	N/A
	Gerry Sorensen	Canada	1981–1984	5	4	–	–	–	1	–	N/A	N/A	N/A
	Sigrid Wolf	Austria	1982–1991	5	2	3	–	–	–	–	N/A	N/A	N/A
	Ulrike Maier	Austria	1985–1994	5	–	2	3	–	–	–	N/A	N/A	N/A
	Urška Hrovat	Slovenia	1992–2001	5	–	–	–	5	–	–	N/A	N/A	N/A
	Corinne Rey-Bellet	Switzerland	1992–2003	5	3	2	–	–	–	–	N/A	N/A	–
	Veronika Velez Zuzulová	Slovakia	2001–2018	5	–	–	–	4	–	–	N/A	1	–
	Wendy Holdener	Switzerland	2010–active	5	–	–	–	2	2	–	–	1	N/A
	Julia Scheib	Austria	2018–active	5	–	–	5	–	–	–	–	–	N/A
96	Florence Steurer	France	1967–1972	4	–	N/A	1	3	N/A	N/A	N/A	N/A	N/A
	Patricia Emonet	France	1973–1979	4	–	N/A	1	3	–	–	N/A	N/A	N/A
	Maria Rosa Quario	Italy	1979–1984	4	–	–	–	4	–	–	N/A	N/A	N/A
	Elisabeth Kirchler	Austria	1981–1989	4	3	–	–	–	1	–	N/A	N/A	N/A
	Blanca Fernández Ochoa	Spain	1981–1992	4	–	–	1	3	–	–	N/A	N/A	N/A
	Traudl Hächer	West Germany	1981–1992	4	–	2	2	–	–	–	N/A	N/A	N/A
	Michaela Gerg-Leitner	Germany	1981–1996	4	3	–	1	–	–	–	N/A	N/A	N/A
	Corinne Schmidhauser	Switzerland	1985–1989	4	–	–	–	4	–	–	N/A	N/A	N/A
	Katrin Gutensohn	Austria	1986–1992	4	4	–	–	–	–	–	N/A	N/A	N/A
	Katharina Gutensohn	Austria; Germany	1989–1990; 1990–1998	4	4	–	–	–	–	–	N/A	N/A	N/A
	Varvara Zelenskaya	Russia	1989–2002	4	4	–	–	–	–	–	N/A	N/A	N/A
	Ylva Nowén	Sweden	1990–2002	4	–	–	–	4	–	–	N/A	N/A	N/A
	Claudia Riegler	New Zealand	1995–2003	4	–	–	–	4	–	–	N/A	N/A	–
	Nadia Styger	Switzerland	1999–2010	4	1	3	–	–	–	–	N/A	N/A	–
	Sandrine Aubert	France	2004–2014	4	–	–	–	4	–	–	N/A	–	N/A
	Fabienne Suter	Switzerland	2003–2017	4	1	3	–	–	–	–	N/A	–	–
	Frida Hansdotter	Sweden	2005–2019	4	–	–	–	4	–	–	N/A	–	N/A
	Nicole Schmidhofer	Austria	2007–2023	4	3	1	–	–	–	–	–	–	N/A
	Ragnhild Mowinckel	Norway	2012–2024	4	1	2	1	–	–	–	–	–	N/A
	Elena Curtoni	Italy	2010–active	4	2	2	–	–	–	–	–	–	N/A
	Ester Ledecká	Czech Republic	2016–active	4	2	2	–	–	–	–	–	–	N/A
	Camille Rast	Switzerland	2017–active	4	–	–	1	3	–	–	–	–	N/A
118	Fernande Bochatay	Switzerland	1967–1969	3	–	N/A	2	1	N/A	N/A	N/A	N/A	N/A
	Olga Pall	Austria	1967–1970	3	3	N/A	–	–	N/A	N/A	N/A	N/A	N/A
	Bernadette Rauter	Austria	1967–1973	3	–	N/A	1	2	N/A	N/A	N/A	N/A	N/A
	Judy Nagel	United States	1968–1970	3	–	N/A	1	2	N/A	N/A	N/A	N/A	N/A
	Marilyn Cochran	United States	1968–1974	3	–	N/A	1	2	N/A	N/A	N/A	N/A	N/A
	Barbara Cochran	United States	1968–1974	3	–	N/A	1	2	N/A	N/A	N/A	N/A	N/A
	Betsy Clifford	Canada	1968–1976	3	–	N/A	1	2	–	–	N/A	N/A	N/A
	Claudia Giordani	Italy	1973–1981	3	–	N/A	1	2	–	–	N/A	N/A	N/A
	Fabienne Serrat	France	1973–1984	3	–	–	1	2	–	–	N/A	N/A	N/A
	Regina Sackl	Austria	1974–1981	3	–	N/A	–	3	–	–	N/A	N/A	N/A
	Holly Flanders	United States	1979–1986	3	3	–	–	–	–	–	N/A	N/A	N/A
	Anni Kronbichler	Austria	1980–1989	3	–	–	–	3	–	–	N/A	N/A	N/A
	Heidi Zurbriggen	Switzerland	1985–1998	3	3	–	–	–	–	–	N/A	N/A	N/A
	Hilary Lindh	United States	1986–1997	3	3	–	–	–	–	–	N/A	N/A	N/A
	Heidi Zeller-Bähler	Switzerland	1986–1997	3	–	1	2	–	–	–	N/A	N/A	N/A
	Anja Haas	Austria	1990–1996	3	3	–	–	–	–	–	N/A	N/A	N/A
	Julie M.J. Parisien	United States	1991–1994	3	–	–	1	2	–	–	N/A	N/A	N/A
	Elfi Eder	Austria	1991–1997	3	–	–	–	3	–	–	N/A	N/A	N/A
	Sabina Panzanini	Italy	1993–2000	3	–	–	3	–	–	–	N/A	N/A	N/A
	Andrine Flemmen	Norway	1995–2006	3	–	–	3	–	–	–	N/A	N/A	–
	Laure Pequegnot	France	1995–2006	3	–	–	–	3	–	–	N/A	N/A	–
	Brigitte Obermoser	Austria	1996–2007	3	1	1	1	–	–	–	N/A	N/A	–
	Andrea Fischbacher	Austria	2005–2015	3	2	1	–	–	–	–	N/A	–	N/A
	Dominique Gisin	Switzerland	2006–2015	3	2	1	–	–	–	–	N/A	–	N/A
	Michaela Kirchgasser	Austria	2002–2018	3	–	–	1	2	–	–	N/A	–	–
	Maria Pietilä-Holmner	Sweden	2003–2018	3	–	–	–	2	–	–	N/A	1	–
	Eva-Maria Brem	Austria	2007–2021	3	–	–	3	–	–	–	–	–	N/A
	Stephanie Venier	Austria	2014–2025	3	2	1	–	–	–	–	–	–	N/A
	Valérie Grenier	Canada	2015–active	3	–	–	3	–	–	–	–	–	N/A
	Katharina Liensberger	Austria	2016–active	3	–	-	–	3	–	–	–	–	N/A
	Laura Pirovano	Italy	2016–active	3	3	-	–	–	–	–	–	–	N/A
	Zrinka Ljutić	Croatia	2021–active	3	–	–	–	3	N/A	–	–	N/A	N/A
150	Annie Famose	France	1967–1972	2	–	N/A	–	2	N/A	N/A	N/A	N/A	N/A
	Evi Mittermaier	West Germany	1975–1980	2	2	N/A	–	–	–	–	N/A	N/A	N/A
	Ursula Konzett	Liechtenstein	1977–1985	2	–	–	–	2	–	–	N/A	N/A	N/A
	Olga Charvatova	Czechoslovakia	1979–1986	2	–	–	–	1	1	–	N/A	N/A	N/A
	Daniela Zini	Italy	1979–1986	2	–	–	–	2	–	–	N/A	N/A	N/A
	Zoe Haas	Switzerland	1979–1992	2	1	1	–	–	–	–	N/A	N/A	N/A
	Catherine Quittet	France	1980–1990	2	–	1	1	–	–	–	N/A	N/A	N/A
	Sylvia Eder	Austria	1981–1995	2	1	1	–	–	–	–	N/A	N/A	N/A
	Christelle Guignard	France	1984–1993	2	–	–	–	2	–	–	N/A	N/A	N/A
	Diann Roffe	United States	1984–1994	2	–	1	1	–	–	–	N/A	N/A	N/A
	Beatrice Gafner	Switzerland	1987–1989	2	2	–	–	–	–	–	N/A	N/A	N/A
	Christina Meier	Germany	1987–1995	2	–	–	2	–	–	–	N/A	N/A	N/A
	Kate Pace	Canada	1991–1998	2	2	–	–	–	–	–	N/A	N/A	N/A
	Karin Roten Meier	Switzerland	1994–2001	2	–	–	–	2	–	–	N/A	N/A	N/A
	Trine Bakke	Norway	1994–2006	2	–	–	–	2	–	–	N/A	N/A	–
	Sabine Egger	Austria	1995–2005	2	–	–	–	2	–	–	N/A	N/A	–
	Petra Haltmayr	Germany	1995–2007	2	1	1	–	–	–	–	N/A	N/A	–
	Kathrin Hölzl	Germany	2002–2013	2	–	–	2	–	–	–	N/A	–	–
	Jessica Lindell-Vikarby	Sweden	2003–2015	2	–	1	1	–	–	–	N/A	–	–
	Šárka Záhrobská	Czech Republic	2003–2017	2	–	–	–	2	–	–	N/A	–	–
	Elena Fanchini	Italy	2005–2020	2	2	–	–	–	–	–	–	–	N/A
	Nadia Fanchini	Italy	2006–2020	2	1	1	–	–	–	–	–	–	N/A
	Nina Haver-Løseth	Norway	2006–2020	2	–	–	–	1	–	–	–	1	N/A
	Marie-Michèle Gagnon	Canada	2009–2023	2	–	–	–	–	2	–	–	–	N/A
	Ramona Siebenhofer	Austria	2010–2023	2	2	–	–	–	–	–	–	–	N/A
	Mirjam Puchner	Austria	2013–2026	2	2	–	–	–	–	–	–	–	N/A
	Anna Swenn-Larsson	Sweden	2011–active	2	–	–	–	2	–	–	–	–	N/A
	Andreja Slokar	Slovenia	2018–active	2	–	–	–	1	–	–	1	–	N/A
	Lena Dürr	Germany	2008–active	2	–	–	–	1	–	–	–	1	N/A
	Nina Ortlieb	Austria	2014–active	2	–	2	–	–	–	–	–	–	N/A
	Jasmine Flury	Switzerland	2014–active	2	1	1	–	–	–	–	–	–	N/A
181	Erika Schinegger	Austria	1967	1	–	N/A	1	–	N/A	N/A	N/A	–	N/A
	Christine Goitschel	France	1967–1968	1	–	N/A	1	–	N/A	N/A	N/A	–	N/A
	Burgl Färbinger	West Germany	1967–1969	1	–	N/A	–	1	N/A	N/A	N/A	–	N/A
	Giustina Demetz	Italy	1967–1970	1	1	N/A	–	–	N/A	N/A	N/A	–	N/A
	Annerösli Zryd	Switzerland	1967–1970	1	1	N/A	–	–	N/A	N/A	N/A	–	N/A
	Jacqueline Rouvier	France	1967–1976	1	1	N/A	–	–	–	–	N/A	N/A	N/A
	Pamela Behr	West Germany	1971–1980	1	–	N/A	–	1	–	–	N/A	N/A	N/A
	Kathy Kreiner	Canada	1972–1981	1	–	N/A	1	–	–	–	N/A	N/A	N/A
	Abbi Fisher	United States	1975–1982	1	–	–	–	1	–	–	N/A	N/A	N/A
	Regine Mösenlechner	West Germany	1975–1992	1	–	1	–	–	–	–	N/A	N/A	N/A
	Jana Šoltýsová	Czechoslovakia	1976–1981	1	1	N/A	–	–	–	N/A	N/A	N/A	N/A
	Cornelia Pröll	Austria	1976–1982	1	1	–	–	–	–	N/A	N/A	N/A	N/A
	Lea Sölkner	Austria	1976–1984	1	–	–	–	1	–	N/A	N/A	N/A	N/A
	Caroline Attia	France	1979–1985	1	1	–	–	–	–	N/A	N/A	N/A	N/A
	Marie-Cécile Gros-Gaudenier	France	1979–1985	1	1	–	–	–	–	N/A	N/A	N/A	N/A
	Élisabeth Chaud	France	1979–1986	1	–	–	1	–	–	N/A	N/A	N/A	N/A
	Anne-Flore Rey	France	1979–1988	1	–	–	1	–	–	N/A	N/A	N/A	N/A
	Paoletta Magoni	Italy	1981–1988	1	–	–	–	1	–	N/A	N/A	N/A	N/A
	Ida Ladstätter	Austria	1981–1995	1	–	–	–	1	–	N/A	N/A	N/A	N/A
	Dorota Mogore-Tlalka	Poland	1982–1990	1	–	–	–	1	–	N/A	N/A	N/A	N/A
	Monika Hess	Switzerland	1982–1987	1	–	–	–	–	1	N/A	N/A	N/A	N/A
	Liisa Savijarvi	Canada	1983–1987	1	–	1	–	–	–	N/A	N/A	N/A	N/A
	Pam Fletcher	United States	1983–1989	1	1	–	–	–	–	N/A	N/A	N/A	N/A
	Karin Buder	Austria	1983–1993	1	–	–	–	1	–	N/A	N/A	N/A	N/A
	Michaela Marzola	Italy	1985–1988	1	–	1	–	–	–	N/A	N/A	N/A	N/A
	Camilla Nilsson	Sweden	1985–1990	1	–	–	–	1	–	N/A	N/A	N/A	N/A
	Monika Maierhofer	Austria	1985–1995	1	–	–	–	1	–	N/A	N/A	N/A	N/A
	Veronika Šarec	Yugoslavia	1986–1992	1	–	–	–	1	–	N/A	N/A	N/A	N/A
	Claudia Strobl	Austria	1986–1994	1	–	–	–	1	–	N/A	N/A	N/A	N/A
	Miriam Vogt	Germany	1986–1998	1	1	–	–	–	–	–	N/A	N/A	N/A
	Kristina Andersson	Sweden	1987–1998	1	–	–	–	1	–	–	N/A	N/A	N/A
	Patricia Chauvet	France	1988–1998	1	–	–	–	1	–	–	N/A	N/A	N/A
	Ingrid Stöckl	Austria	1989–1998	1	–	–	–	–	1	–	N/A	N/A	N/A
	Florence Masnada	France	1989–1989	1	–	1	–	–	–	N/A	N/A	N/A	N/A
	Nathalie Bouvier	France	1990–1996	1	–	–	1	–	–	N/A	N/A	N/A	N/A
	Svetlana Gladysheva	Russia	1990–1998	1	–	1	–	–	–	–	N/A	N/A	N/A
	Merete Fjeldavlie	Norway	1990–2002	1	–	1	–	–	–	–	N/A	N/A	N/A
	Nataša Bokal	Yugoslavia	1990–2003	1	–	–	–	1	–	–	N/A	N/A	N/A
	Lara Magoni	Italy	1991–2000	1	–	–	–	1	–	–	N/A	N/A	N/A
	Annelise Coberger	New Zealand	1992–1995	1	–	–	–	1	–	–	N/A	N/A	N/A
	Leila Piccard	France	1992–2000	1	–	–	–	–	–	1	N/A	N/A	N/A
	Bibiana Perez	Italy	1992–2001	1	–	–	–	–	1	–	N/A	N/A	N/A
	Regina Häusl	Germany	1992–2005	1	1	–	–	–	–	–	N/A	N/A	N/A
	Mojca Suhadolc	Slovenia	1993–2005	1	–	1	–	–	–	–	N/A	N/A	N/A
	Melanie Turgeon	Canada	1993–2005	1	–	1	–	–	–	–	N/A	N/A	N/A
	Katja Koren	Slovenia	1994–1998	1	–	1	–	–	–	–	N/A	N/A	N/A
	Alenka Dovžan	Slovenia	1994–2003	1	–	1	–	–	–	–	N/A	N/A	N/A
	Mélanie Suchet	France	1994–2004	1	–	1	–	–	–	–	N/A	N/A	N/A
	Ingeborg Helen Marken	Norway	1995–2002	1	–	1	–	–	–	–	N/A	N/A	N/A
	Birgit Heeb-Batliner	Liechtenstein	1995–2003	1	–	–	1	–	–	–	N/A	N/A	N/A
	Christel Pascal	France	1995–2006	1	–	–	–	1	–	–	N/A	N/A	N/A
	Marlies Oester	Switzerland	1995–2006	1	–	–	–	1	–	–	N/A	N/A	N/A
	Ingrid Jacquemod	France	1995–2011	1	1	–	–	–	–	–	N/A	N/A	N/A
	Christiane Mitterwallner	Austria	1996–2001	1	–	1	–	–	–	–	N/A	N/A	N/A
	Zali Steggall	Australia	1996–2002	1	–	–	–	1	–	–	N/A	N/A	N/A
	Anna Ottosson	Sweden	1996–2007	1	–	–	1	–	–	–	N/A	N/A	N/A
	Kirsten Clark	United States	1997–2007	1	1	–	–	–	–	–	N/A	N/A	N/A
	Sylviane Berthod	Switzerland	1997–2008	1	1	–	–	–	–	–	N/A	N/A	N/A
	Lilian Kummer	Switzerland	1998–2004	1	–	–	1	–	–	N/A	N/A	N/A	N/A
	Sarah Schleper	United States	1998–2011	1	–	–	–	1	–	N/A	N/A	–	–
	Carolina Ruiz Castillo	Spain	1998–2015	1	1	–	–	–	–	N/A	N/A	–	–
	Genevieve Simard	Canada	1999–2010	1	–	1	–	–	–	N/A	N/A	–	–
	Corinne Imlig	Switzerland	2000–2003	1	1	–	–	–	–	N/A	N/A	–	–
	Stina Hofgaard Nilsen	Norway	2000–2004	1	–	–	1	–	–	N/A	N/A	–	–
	Emily Brydon	Canada	2000–2010	1	–	1	–	–	–	N/A	N/A	–	–
	Britt Janyk	Canada	2000–2011	1	1	–	–	–	–	N/A	N/A	–	–
	Daniela Merighetti	Italy	2001–2016	1	1	–	–	–	–	N/A	N/A	–	–
	Martina Schild	Switzerland	2002–2012	1	–	1	–	–	–	N/A	N/A	–	–
	Fränzi Aufdenblatten	Switzerland	2002–2014	1	–	1	–	–	–	N/A	N/A	–	–
	Chiara Costazza	Italy	2003–2019	1	–	–	–	1	–	–	N/A	–	–
	Therese Borssén	Sweden	2004–2013	1	–	–	–	1	–	N/A	N/A	–	N/A
	Gina Stechert	Germany	2006–2014	1	1	–	–	–	–	N/A	N/A	–	N/A
	Marianne Kaufmann-Abderhalden	Switzerland	2006–2015	1	1	–	–	–	–	N/A	N/A	–	N/A
	Maria Holaus	Austria	2007–2010	1	–	1	–	–	–	N/A	N/A	N/A	N/A
	Alice McKennis	United States	2009–2021	1	1	–	–	–	–	–	–	–	N/A
	Erin Mielzynski	Canada	2009–2022	1	–	–	–	1	–	–	–	–	N/A
	Christine Scheyer	Austria	2015–2024	1	1	–	–	–	–	–	–	–	N/A
	Clara Direz	France	2013–2026	1	–	–	–	–	–	–	1	–	N/A
	Michelle Gisin	Switzerland	2013–2026	1	–	–	–	1	–	–	–	–	N/A
	Priska Nufer	Switzerland	2012–active	1	1	–	–	–	–	–	–	–	N/A
	Romane Miradoli	France	2012–active	1	–	1	–	–	–	–	–	–	N/A
	Paula Moltzan	United States	2013–active	1	–	–	1	–	–	–	–	–	N/A
	Katharina Truppe	Austria	2015–active	1	-	–	–	1	–	–	–	–	N/A
	Nicol Delago	Italy	2015–active	1	1	–	–	–	–	–	–	–	N/A
	Kajsa Vickhoff Lie	Norway	2018–active	1	1	–	–	–	–	–	–	–	N/A
	Lauren Macuga	United States	2022–active	1	–	1	–	–	N/A	N/A	N/A	N/A	N/A
	Lara Colturi	Albania	2023–active	1	–	–	–	1	N/A	N/A	N/A	N/A	N/A
	Malorie Blanc	Switzerland	2025–active	1	–	1	–	–	N/A	N/A	N/A	N/A	N/A

Last updated: 21 November 2026

- Katharina Gutensohn, who performed as Katrin under Austria achieved her total of eight world cup victories under two different flags: Austria (4) and Germany (4).

== Consecutive seasons with at least one win ==
Still active

Skier	First & last	Wins
(United States) Mikaela Shiffrin	2013–2026	14
(Switzerland) Vreni Schneider	1985–1995	11
(Austria) Renate Götschl	1997–2007	11
(Sweden) Anja Pärson	2002–2011	10
(Italy) Federica Brignone	2016–2025	10
(Italy) Sofia Goggia	2017–2026	10
(United States) Lindsey Vonn	2005–2013	9
(Slovakia) Petra Vlhová	2016–2024	9
(Liechtenstein) Hanni Wenzel	1977–1984	8
(Germany) Maria Höfl-Riesch	2007–2014	8
(Switzerland) Maria Walliser	1983–1990	8
(Germany) Hilde Gerg	1997–2005	8
(Germany) Katja Seizinger	1992–1998	7
(Switzerland) Erika Hess	1981–1987	7
(Croatia) Janica Kostelić	1999–2006	7
(Switzerland) Michela Figini	1984–1990	7
(Sweden) Pernilla Wiberg	1991–1997	7
(Italy) Deborah Compagnoni	1992–1998	7
(Switzerland) Lara Gut	2013–2018	6
(France) Carole Merle	1988–1993	6
(Liechtenstein) Tina Weirather	2013–2018	6
(Switzerland) Lara Gut-Behrami	2020–2025	6
(Germany) Emma Aicher	2025–2027	3

== Records ==
Records	Winners	Nationality	Age
Oldest Race Winner	Lindsey Vonn	United States	41 years 1 month 25 days
Youngest Race Winner	Pamela Behr	Germany	16 years 2 months 18 days

== Statistics ==
	Seasons	Total	DH	SG	GS	SL	KB	PSL	PGS	CE	KO
Individual events	1967–active	1885	465	287	476	531	106	6	3	10	1
Double wins	1967–active	17	3	4	5	5	–	–	–	–	–
Triple wins	1967–active	2	–	1	1	–	–	–	–	–	–
Total winners	1967–active	1906	468	293	483	536	106	6	3	10	1
Different winners by disciplines	1967–active	268	108	87	105	118	41	5	3	8	1

== Milestones ==
- First to win 10 races in one event: Annemarie Moser-Pröll (downhill)
- First to win 20 races in one event: Annemarie Moser-Pröll (downhill)
- First to win 30 races in one event: Annemarie Moser-Pröll (downhill)
- First to win 40 races in one event: Lindsey Vonn (downhill)
- First to win 50 races in one event: Mikaela Shiffrin (slalom)
- First to win 60 races in one event: Mikaela Shiffrin (slalom)
- First to win 70 races in one event: Mikaela Shiffrin (slalom)
- First to win 10 races in two events: Annemarie Moser-Pröll (downhill and giant slalom)
- First to win 20 races in two events: Vreni Schneider (slalom and giant slalom)
- First to win 30 races in two events: pending
- First to win 40 races in two events: pending
- First to win races in three events: Nancy Greene (downhill, slalom and giant slalom)
- First to win races in four events: Annemarie Moser-Pröll (downhill, slalom, giant slalom and combined)
- First to win races in five events: Petra Kronberger (downhill, super-G, slalom, giant slalom and combined)
- First to win races in six events: Mikaela Shiffrin (downhill, super-G, slalom, giant slalom, combined and parallel slalom)
- First to win 10 races in three events: Lara Gut-Behrami (downhill, super-G, giant slalom)
- First to win 5 races in four events: pending
- First to win 5 races in all five events: pending
