= Alpine skiing at the 1994 Winter Olympics – Women's slalom =

Skiing event at the 1994 Olympics

Women's slalom at the XVII Olympic Winter Games
- Alpine skiing
- Venue: Hafjell
- Date: 26 February 1994
- Competitors: 55 from 25 nations
- Winning time: 1:56.01

Medalists
1st place, gold medalist(s)		Vreni Schneider	Switzerland
2nd place, silver medalist(s)		Elfi Eder	Austria
3rd place, bronze medalist(s)		Katja Koren	Slovenia

The Women's slalom competition of the Lillehammer 1994 Olympics was held at Hafjell on Saturday, 26 February.

The defending world champion was Karin Buder of Austria, while Switzerland's Vreni Schneider was the defending World Cup slalom champion and led the current season. Defending Olympic champion Petra Kronberger had retired over a year earlier.

Schneider won the gold medal, Elfi Eder of Austria took the silver, and the bronze medalist was Katja Koren of Slovenia.

== Results ==
Rank	Name	Country	Run 1	Run 2	Total	Difference
1st place, gold medalist(s)	Vreni Schneider	Switzerland	0:59.68	0:56.33	1:56.01	—
2nd place, silver medalist(s)	Elfi Eder	Austria	0:59.54	0:56.81	1:56.35	+0.34
3rd place, bronze medalist(s)	Katja Koren	Slovenia	0:59.00	0:57.61	1:56.61	+0.60
4	Pernilla Wiberg	Sweden	0:59.05	0:57.63	1:56.68	+0.67
5	Gabi Zingre	Switzerland	0:59.62	0:58.18	1:57.80	+1.79
6	Christine von Grünigen	Switzerland	1:00.76	0:57.10	1:57.86	+1.85
7	Roberta Serra	Italy	1:00.39	0:57.49	1:57.88	+1.87
8	Urška Hrovat	Slovenia	1:00.38	0:57.69	1:58.07	+2.06
9	Morena Gallizio	Italy	1:00.43	0:57.76	1:58.19	+2.18
10	Deborah Compagnoni	Italy	1:00.25	0:58.01	1:58.26	+2.25
11	Špela Pretnar	Slovenia	1:00.78	0:57.87	1:58.65	+2.64
12	Monika Maierhofer	Austria	1:01.05	0:57.69	1:58.74	+2.73
13	Titti Rodling	Sweden	1:01.01	0:58.06	1:59.07	+3.06
14	Martina Ertl	Germany	1:01.23	0:58.42	1:59.65	+3.64
15	Trude Gimle	Norway	1:01.55	0:58.32	1:59.87	+3.86
16	Lara Magoni	Italy	1:00.77	0:59.24	2:00.01	+4.00
17	Martina Accola	Switzerland	1:00.45	0:59.58	2:00.03	+4.02
18	Carrie Sheinberg	United States	1:01.63	0:58.53	2:00.16	+4.15
19	Kristina Andersson	Sweden	1:01.46	0:59.29	2:00.75	+4.74
20	Ásta Halldórsdóttir	Iceland	1:01.86	0:59.69	2:01.55	+5.54
21	Lucia Medzihradská	Slovakia	1:02.67	0:58.88	2:01.55	+5.54
22	Zali Steggall	Australia	1:03.16	0:59.88	2:03.04	+7.03
23	Mónica Bosch	Spain	1:03.79	1:02.32	2:06.11	+10.10
24	Caroline Poussier	Andorra	1:04.46	1:02.36	2:06.82	+10.81
25	Szvetlana Keszthelyi	Hungary	1:06.09	1:02.91	2:09.00	+12.99
26	Gabriela Quijano	Argentina	1:09.70	1:07.56	2:17.26	+21.25
27	Arijana Boras	Bosnia and Herzegovina	1:10.92	1:07.80	2:18.72	+22.71
28	Ágnes Litter	Hungary	1:31.67	1:03.94	2:35.61	+39.60
-	Leila Piccard	France	1:01.33	DNF	-	-
-	Eva Twardokens	United States	1:01.47	DNF	-	-
-	Julie Parisien	United States	1:01.61	DQ	-	-
-	Monique Pelletier	United States	1:01.87	DQ	-	-
-	Claudia Riegler	New Zealand	1:02.26	DNF	-	-
-	Hilde Gerg	Germany	1:02.48	DNF	-	-
-	Olha Lohinova	Ukraine	1:03.49	DQ	-	-
-	Thomal Lefoussi	Greece	1:12.16	DNF	-	-
-	Patricia Chauvet	France	DNF	-	-	-
-	Marianne Kjørstad	Norway	DNF	-	-	-
-	Annelise Coberger	New Zealand	DNF	-	-	-
-	Anita Wachter	Austria	DNF	-	-	-
-	Miriam Vogt	Germany	DNF	-	-	-
-	Alenka Dovžan	Slovenia	DNF	-	-	-
-	Béatrice Filliol	France	DNF	-	-	-
-	Trine Bakke	Norway	DQ	-	-	-
-	Edda Mutter	Germany	DNF	-	-	-
-	Florence Masnada	France	DNF	-	-	-
-	Emma Carrick-Anderson	Great Britain	DNF	-	-	-
-	Mélanie Turgeon	Canada	DNF	-	-	-
-	Erika Hansson	Sweden	DNF	-	-	-
-	Claire de Pourtales	Great Britain	DNF	-	-	-
-	Caroline Gedde-Dahl	Norway	DQ	-	-	-
-	Ainhoa Ibarra Astellara	Spain	DNF	-	-	-
-	Vicky Grau	Andorra	DNF	-	-	-
-	Ophélie David	Hungary	DNF	-	-	-
-	María José Rienda Contreras	Spain	DNF	-	-	-
