= Alpine skiing at the 1994 Winter Olympics – Women's giant slalom =

Women's giant slalom at the XVII Olympic Winter Games
- Alpine skiing
- Venue: Hafjell
- Date: February 24, 1994
- Competitors: 47 from 19 nations
- Winning time: 2:30.97

Medalists
| 1st place, gold medalist(s) | | Deborah Compagnoni | Italy |
| 2nd place, silver medalist(s) | | Martina Ertl | Germany |
| 3rd place, bronze medalist(s) | | Vreni Schneider | Switzerland |

The Women's giant slalom competition of the Lillehammer 1994 Olympics was held at Hafjell on Thursday, February 24.

The defending world champion was Carole Merle of France, as well as the defending World Cup giant slalom champion, while Austria's Anita Wachter led the current season.

Italy's Deborah Compagnoni won the gold medal, Martina Ertl of Germany took the silver, and the bronze medalist was Vreni Schneider of Switzerland. Compagnoni led after the first run, followed by Hilde Gerg of Germany and Wachter; Gerg failed to finish, Wachter was fourth, and Merle was fifth.

Compagnoni dedicated the win to her late friend Ulrike Maier of Austria, who died after a crash in a downhill event in late January.

== Results ==
| Rank | Name | Country | Run 1 | Run 2 | Total | Difference |
|---|---|---|---|---|---|---|
| 1st place, gold medalist(s) | Deborah Compagnoni | Italy | 1:20.37 | 1:10.60 | 2:30.97 | — |
| 2nd place, silver medalist(s) | Martina Ertl | Germany | 1:21.34 | 1:10.85 | 2:32.19 | +1.22 |
| 3rd place, bronze medalist(s) | Vreni Schneider | Switzerland | 1:21.29 | 1:11.68 | 2:32.97 | +2.00 |
| 4 | Anita Wachter | Austria | 1:21.18 | 1:11.88 | 2:33.06 | +2.09 |
| 5 | Carole Merle | France | 1:21.56 | 1:11.88 | 2:33.44 | +2.47 |
| 6 | Eva Twardokens | United States | 1:22.12 | 1:12.29 | 2:34.41 | +3.44 |
| 7 | Lara Magoni | Italy | 1:21.85 | 1:12.82 | 2:34.67 | +3.70 |
| 8 | Marianne Kjørstad | Norway | 1:21.81 | 1:12.98 | 2:34.79 | +3.82 |
| 9 | Heidi Zeller-Bähler | Switzerland | 1:23.14 | 1:12.00 | 2:35.14 | +4.17 |
| 10 | Christina Meier-Höck | Germany | 1:22.02 | 1:13.20 | 2:35.22 | +4.25 |
| 11 | Birgit Heeb | Liechtenstein | 1:22.58 | 1:13.51 | 2:36.09 | +5.12 |
| 12 | Špela Pretnar | Slovenia | 1:22.81 | 1:13.30 | 2:36.11 | +5.14 |
| 13 | Anne-Lise Parisien | United States | 1:23.55 | 1:12.89 | 2:36.44 | +5.47 |
| 14 | Sylvia Eder | Austria | 1:23.03 | 1:13.45 | 2:36.48 | +5.51 |
| 15 | Karin Roten | Switzerland | 1:23.22 | 1:13.33 | 2:36.55 | +5.58 |
| 16 | Sabina Panzanini | Italy | 1:22.94 | 1:13.69 | 2:36.63 | +5.66 |
| 17 | Ainhoa Ibarra | Spain | 1:23.36 | 1:13.31 | 2:36.67 | +5.70 |
| 18 | Régine Cavagnoud | France | 1:23.45 | 1:13.33 | 2:36.78 | +5.81 |
| 19 | Trine Bakke-Rognmo | Norway | 1:23.63 | 1:13.55 | 2:37.18 | +6.21 |
| 20 | Urška Hrovat | Slovenia | 1:23.61 | 1:14.55 | 2:38.16 | +7.19 |
| 21 | María José Rienda | Spain | 1:24.62 | 1:14.83 | 2:39.45 | +8.48 |
| 22 | Mónica Bosch | Spain | 1:25.62 | 1:15.61 | 2:41.23 | +10.26 |
| 23 | Ásta Halldórsdóttir | Iceland | 1:28.02 | 1:16.18 | 2:44.20 | +13.23 |
| 24 | Zali Steggall | Australia | 1:28.68 | 1:17.46 | 2:46.14 | +15.17 |
| - | Hilde Gerg | Germany | 1:21.00 | DNF | - | - |
| - | Katja Seizinger | Germany | 1:21.62 | DNF | - | - |
| - | Corinne Rey-Bellet | Switzerland | 1:21.71 | DNF | - | - |
| - | Alenka Dovžan | Slovenia | 1:22.60 | DNF | - | - |
| - | Heidi Voelker | United States | 1:23.08 | DNF | - | - |
| - | Caroline Gedde-Dahl | Norway | 1:23.42 | DNF | - | - |
| - | Diann Roffe | United States | 1:23.99 | DNS | - | - |
| - | Leila Piccard | France | 1:24.58 | DNF | - | - |
| - | Mélanie Turgeon | Canada | 1:25.10 | DNF | - | - |
| - | Vicky Grau | Andorra | 1:26.05 | DNF | - | - |
| - | Olha Lohinova | Ukraine | 1:26.78 | DNS | - | - |
| - | Pernilla Wiberg | Sweden | DNF | - | - | - |
| - | Morena Gallizio | Italy | DNF | - | - | - |
| - | Sophie Lefranc | France | DNF | - | - | - |
| - | Kristina Andersson | Sweden | DNF | - | - | - |
| - | Ylva Nowén | Sweden | DNF | - | - | - |
| - | Katja Koren | Slovenia | DNF | - | - | - |
| - | Alexandra Meissnitzer | Austria | DNF | - | - | - |
| - | Erika Hansson | Sweden | DNF | - | - | - |
| - | Caroline Poussier | Andorra | DNF | - | - | - |
| - | Emma Carrick-Anderson | Great Britain | DNF | - | - | - |
| - | Nataliya Buga | Russia | DNF | - | - | - |
| - | Éva Koch | Hungary | DNF | - | - | - |
