= Ylva Nowén =

Swedish alpine skier (born 1970)

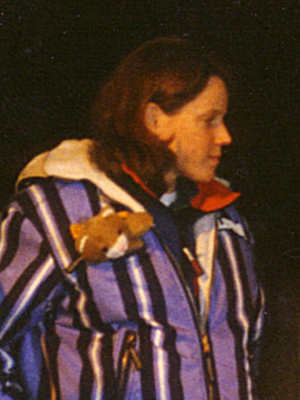
- Ylva Nowén during World Cup competitions in Semmering, Austria in December 1996

Personal information
- Nationality: Sweden
- Born: 5 January 1970 (age 56) Östersund, Sweden

Sport
- Sport: Skiing
- Club: Östersund-Frösö SLK

Ylva Hjördis Sofia Nowén (born 5 January 1970) is a Swedish former alpine skier who was the slalom World Cup champion in the 1997-98 season.

She competed in the 1992, 1994, 1998 and 2002 Winter Olympics.

== World Cup competition victories ==
Date	Location	Race type
20 December 1997	Val d'Isère, France	Slalom
27 December 1997	Lienz, Austria	Slalom
28 December 1997	Lienz, Austria	Slalom
5 January 1998	Bormio, Italy	Slalom

== Olympic results ==
Year	Age	Slalom	Giant slalom	Super-G	Downhill	Combined
1992	22	21	DNF	—	—	—
1994	26	—	DNF	—	—	—
1998	28	12	DNF	—	—	—
2002	32	4	7	—	—	—
