= Kälberloch =

Ski Course

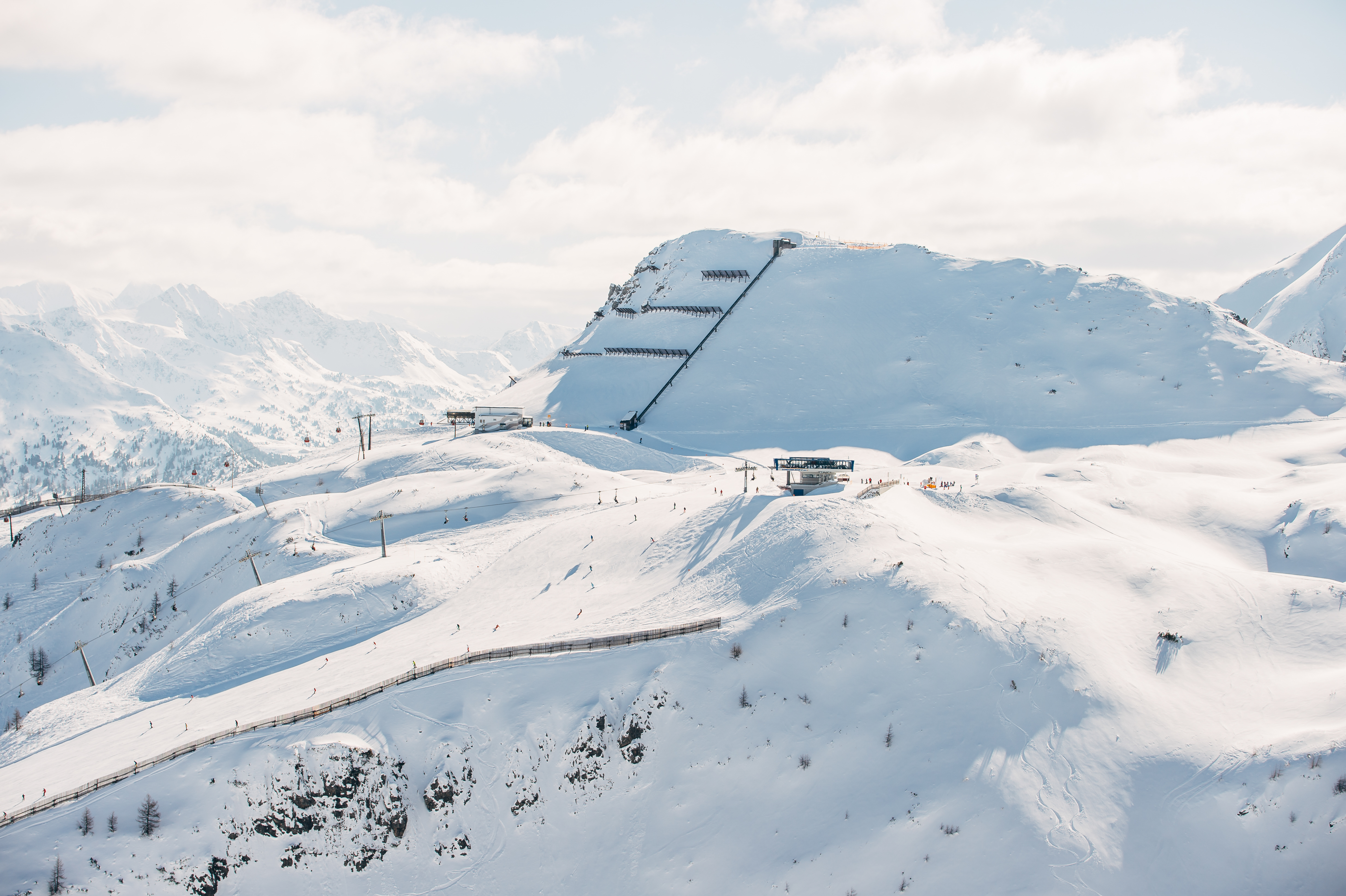
- Extra steep start with 70% fall in the back.
- Interactive map of Kälberloch
- Location within Austria Location within Alps Location within Europe
- 47°17′24″N 13°27′22″E
- Location: Zauchensee, Altenmarkt im Pongau, Salzburg, Austria
- Mountain: Gamskogel (Radstadt Tauern)
- Opened: 1990; 36 years ago
- Level: Expert

Downhill
- Start: 2,176 m (7,139 ft) (AA)
- Finish: 1,380 m (4,528 ft)
- Vertical drop: 796 m (2,612 ft)
- Length: 3.005 km (1.87 mi)
- Max incline: 35 degrees (70%)
- Avg incline: 14.8 degrees (26.5%)
- Most Wins (W): (United States) Lindsey Vonn (4x)

Kälberloch is a World Cup downhill ski course in Austria, located on Gamskogel (Radstadt Tauern) mountain in Zauchensee, Altenmarkt im Pongau, Salzburg; it debuted in 1990.

Kälberloch is considered the most demanding course on the women's World Cup circuit; it hosted the season final speed events for men and women in March 2002, with the technical events on the "Griessenkar" course.

The start fall is so steep (70% gradient) it is impossible to walk uphill; the only access to the start at ridge overhang with barely any space, is via a steep cog railway.

Lara Gut-Behrami won the most recent women's downhill on the full course in January 2022; it was 3.005 km (1.87 mi) in length, with a vertical drop of 796 m (2,612 ft) from a starting elevation of 2,176 m (7,139 ft). Her winning time of 105.78 seconds yielded an average speed of 102.269 km/h (63.5 mph) and an average vertical descent rate of 7.525 m/s (24.7 ft/s).

== Course sections ==
- Startschuss
- Gamsfeld
- Schikane
- Hot Air
- Jägersprung
- Kälberloch
- Wasserschloss
- Kompression
- Panoramakurve
- Unterbergweg
- Lecherneck
- Schmalzleiten
- Tischboden
- Ziel Sprung

== World Cup ==
=== Women ===
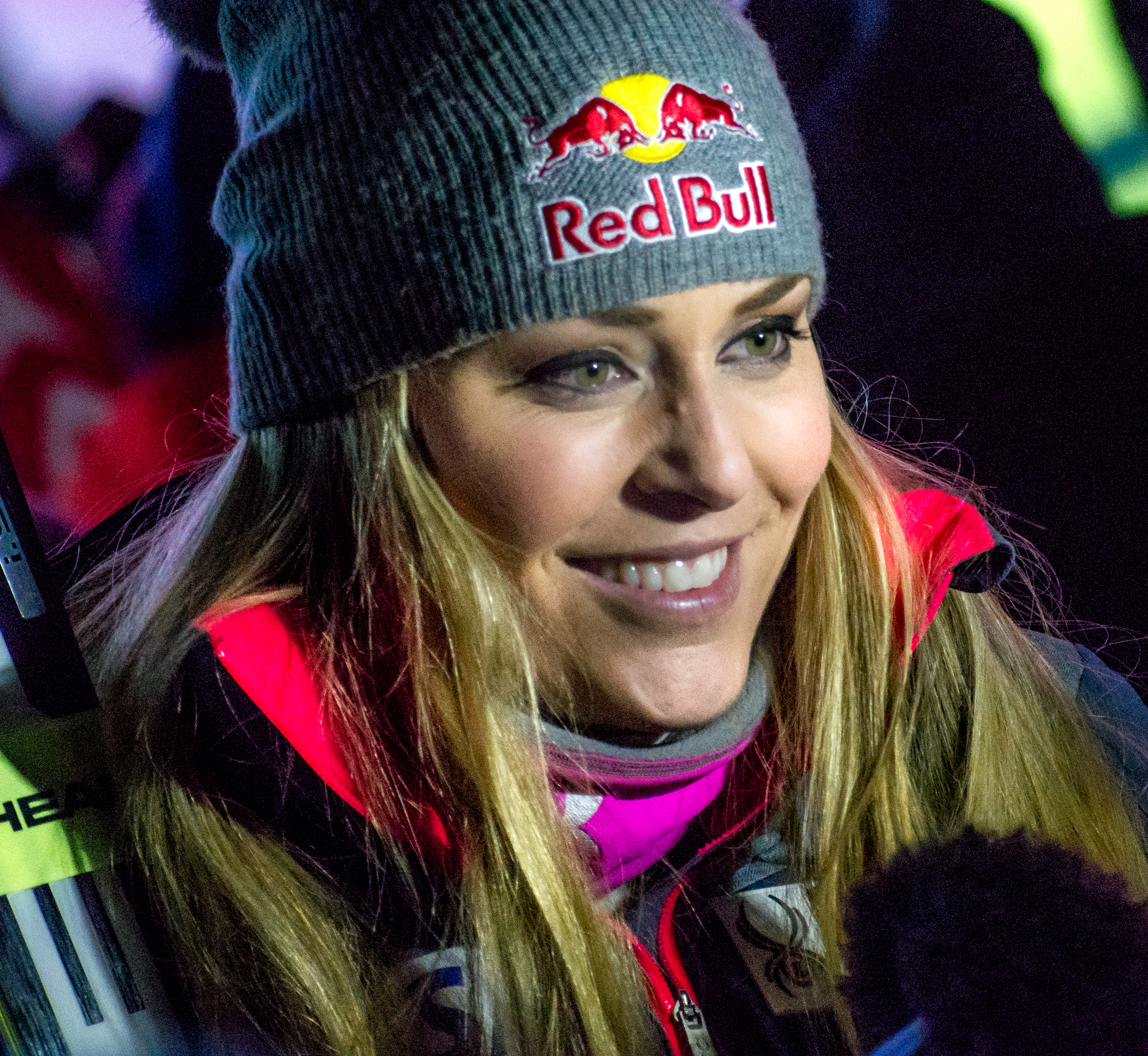
Lindsey Vonn (USA) won record 4 downhills

| No. | Type | Season | Date | Winner | Second | Third |
|---|---|---|---|---|---|---|
| 647 | DH | 1991 | 8 December 1990 | (Germany) Katharina Gutensohn | (Austria) Petra Kronberger | (Canada) Kerrin Lee |
| 648 | SG | 1991 | 9 December 1990 | (Austria) Petra Kronberger | (Austria) Sigrid Wolf | (Austria) Anita Wachter |
| 750 | SL | 1994 | 9 January 1994 | (Switzerland) Vreni Schneider | (Sweden) Pernilla Wiberg | (France) Beatrice Filliol |
| 888 | DH | 1998 | 18 January 1998 | (Austria) Renate Götschl | (Germany) Katja Seizinger | (Austria) Alexandra Meissnitzer |
| 889 | SG | 1998 | 18 January 1998 | (Germany) Martina Ertl | (Switzerland) Heidi Zurbriggen | (France) Mélanie Suchet |
| 956 | DH | 2000 | 15 January 2000 | (Switzerland) Corinne Rey-Bellet | (Germany) Regina Häusl | (Germany) Martina Ertl |
| 957 | SG | 2000 | 16 January 2000 | (Austria) Renate Götschl | (Austria) Tanja Schneider | (Germany) Regina Häusl |
| 1041 | DH | 2002 | 6 March 2002 | (Austria) Michaela Dorfmeister | (United States) Caroline Lalive | (France) Mélanie Suchet |
| 1042 | SG | 2002 | 7 March 2002 | (Austria) Michaela Dorfmeister | (Austria) Alexandra Meissnitzer | (Germany) Hilde Gerg |
| 1120 | SG | 2005 | 11 December 2004 | (Austria) Alexandra Meissnitzer | (Italy) Lucia Recchia | (Slovenia) Tina Maze |
| 1121 | SL | 2005 | 12 December 2004 | (Finland) Tanja Poutiainen | (Austria) Marlies Schild | (Croatia) Janica Kostelić |
| | DH | 2007 | 12 January 2007 | downhill rescheduled on 13 January 2007 | | |
| | SC | 2007 | 13 January 2007 | super combined rescheduled on 14 January 2007 | | |
| 1198 | DH | 2007 | 13 January 2007 | (Austria) Renate Götschl | (Switzerland) Dominique Gisin | (United States) Julia Mancuso |
| 1199 | SC | 2007 | 14 January 2007 | (United States) Julia Mancuso | (United States) Lindsey Kildow | (Austria) Marlies Schild |
| 1267 | SC | 2009 | 17 January 2009 | (United States) Lindsey Vonn | (Austria) Kathrin Zettel | (Sweden) Anja Pärson |
| 1268 | DH | 2009 | 18 January 2009 | (Switzerland) Dominique Gisin (Sweden) Anja Pärson | | (United States) Lindsey Vonn |
| 1333 | DH | 2011 | 8 January 2011 | (United States) Lindsey Vonn | (Sweden) Anja Pärson | (Austria) Anna Fenninger |
| 1334 | SG | 2011 | 9 January 2011 | (Switzerland) Lara Gut | (United States) Lindsey Vonn | (Switzerland) Dominique Gisin |
| 1439 | DH | 2014 | 11 January 2014 | (Austria) Elisabeth Görgl | (Austria) Anna Fenninger | (Germany) Maria Höfl-Riesch |
| 1340 | SC | 2014 | 9 January 2011 | (Canada) Marie-Michèle Gagnon | (Austria) Michaela Kirchgasser | (Germany) Maria Höfl-Riesch |
| 1502 | DH | 2016 | 9 January 2016 | (United States) Lindsey Vonn | (Canada) Larisa Yurkiw | (Austria) Cornelia Hütter |
| 1503 | SG | 2016 | 10 January 2016 | (United States) Lindsey Vonn | (Switzerland) Lara Gut | (Austria) Cornelia Hütter |
| | DH | 2017 | 14 January 2017 | postponed to following day on 15 January 2017 | | |
| 1546 | DH | 2017 | 15 January 2017 | (Austria) Christine Scheyer | (Liechtenstein) Tina Weirather | (United States) Jacqueline Wiles |
| | AC | 2017 | 15 January 2017 | postponed over DH switch; replaced in Crans-Montana on 24 February 2017 | | |
| 1650 | DH | 2020 | 11 January 2020 | (Switzerland) Corinne Suter | (Italy) Nicol Delago | (Switzerland) Michelle Gisin |
| 1651 | AC | 2020 | 12 January 2020 | (Italy) Federica Brignone | (Switzerland) Wendy Holdener | (Italy) Marta Bassino |
| 1718 | DH | 2022 | 15 January 2022 | (Switzerland) Lara Gut-Behrami | (Germany) Kira Weidle | (Austria) Ramona Siebenhofer |
| 1719 | SG | 2022 | 16 January 2022 | (Italy) Federica Brignone | (Switzerland) Corinne Suter | (Austria) Ariane Rädler |
| 1863 | DH | 2026 | 10 January 2026 | (United States) Lindsey Vonn | (Norway) Kajsa Vickhoff Lie | (United States) Jacqueline Wiles |
| | SG | 2026 | 11 January 2026 | cancelled due to strong winds | | |

=== Men ===
| No. | Type | Season | Date | Winner | Second | Third |
|---|---|---|---|---|---|---|
| 1109 | DH | 2002 | 6 March 2002 | (Austria) Stephan Eberharter | (Switzerland) Ambrosi Hoffmann | (Austria) Hannes Trinkl |
| 1110 | SG | 2002 | 7 March 2002 | (Switzerland) Didier Cuche | (Austria) Fritz Strobl | (Italy) Alessandro Fattori |
