= Astrid Lødemel =

Norwegian alpine skier (born 1971)

Medal record

Women's alpine skiing

Representing Norway

World Championships
Silver medal – second place	1993 Morioka-Shizukuishi	Downhill
Bronze medal – third place	1993 Morioka-Shizukuishi	Super-G

Astrid Lødemel (born 9 December 1971) is a retired Norwegian alpine skier from Voss Municipality. Her best result in the World Cup is a second place in Vail, United States, on 13 December 1992 just two hundreds of a second behind Ulrike Maier. Astrid Lødemel has a 3rd place in the World Cup from Morzine, France on 3 March 1993. She also competed in four events at the 1992 Winter Olympics.

The highlight in her career came in the FIS Alpine World Ski Championships 1993 in Morioka in Japan, when she won a silver medal in the downhill behind Kate Pace on 11 February, and on 14 February she won a bronze medal in the Super-G after Katja Seizinger and Sylvia Eder. Astrid Lødemel retired in 1995 due to a knee injury.
