= Alpine skiing at the 1998 Winter Olympics – Women's combined =

Women's combined at the XVIII Olympic Winter Games
- Alpine skiing
- Venue: Hakuba
- Date: February 9–13, 1998
- Competitors: 29 from 17 nations
- Winning time: 2:40.74

Medalists
1st place, gold medalist(s)		Katja Seizinger	Germany
2nd place, silver medalist(s)		Martina Ertl-Renz	Germany
3rd place, bronze medalist(s)		Hilde Gerg	Germany

The Women's combined competition of the Nagano 1998 Olympics was held at Hakuba. The downhill was originally scheduled before the slalom runs, but weather delays meant that the slalom runs were the first. The defending world champion was Renate Goetschl of Austria, while Sweden's Pernilla Wiberg was the defending World Cup combined champion.

== Results ==
Rank	Name	Country	Downhill	Slalom 1	Slalom 2	Total	Difference
1st place, gold medalist(s)	Katja Seizinger	Germany	1:28.52	0:37.14	0:35.08	2:40.74	-
2nd place, silver medalist(s)	Martina Ertl-Renz	Germany	1:29.76	0:36.45	0:34.71	2:40.92	+0.18
3rd place, bronze medalist(s)	Hilde Gerg	Germany	1:29.92	0:36.52	0:35.06	2:41.50	+0.76
4	Steffi Schuster	Austria	1:30.10	0:36.25	0:35.90	2:42.25	+1.51
5	Morena Gallizio	Italy	1:30.60	0:36.83	0:35.09	2:42.52	+1.78
6	Florence Masnada	France	1:29.87	0:37.21	0:35.76	2:42.84	+2.10
7	Caroline Lalive	United States	1:31.05	0:37.29	0:36.42	2:44.76	+4.02
8	Janica Kostelić	Croatia	1:31.71	0:37.35	0:36.17	2:45.23	+4.49
9	Alex Shaffer	United States	1:32.53	0:37.33	0:35.38	2:45.24	+4.50
10	Catherine Borghi	Switzerland	1:31.24	0:37.32	0:36.77	2:45.33	+4.59
11	Brigitte Obermoser	Austria	1:29.82	0:38.81	0:36.85	2:45.48	+4.74
12	Monika Bergmann-Schmuderer	Germany	1:33.35	0:37.41	0:35.08	2:45.84	+5.10
13	Ingeborg Helen Marken	Norway	1:30.65	0:39.00	0:37.54	2:47.19	+6.45
14	Jonna Mendes	United States	1:31.16	0:39.92	0:37.51	2:48.59	+7.85
15	Lucie Hrstková	Czech Republic	1:33.29	0:39.30	0:37.37	2:49.96	+9.22
16	Junko Yamakawa	Japan	1:34.98	0:38.24	0:37.14	2:50.36	+9.62
17	Tamara Schädler	Liechtenstein	1:34.18	0:39.46	0:38.54	2:52.18	+11.44
18	Kirsten Clark	United States	1:31.47	0:41.75	0:39.03	2:52.25	+11.51
19	Carola Calello	Argentina	1:35.09	0:39.98	0:38.70	2:53.77	+13.03
20	Yuliya Kharkivska	Ukraine	1:35.84	0:41.10	0:40.17	2:57.11	+16.37
21	Mónika Kovács	Hungary	1:37.35	0:45.90	0:43.06	3:06.31	+25.57
-	Kristine Kristiansen	Norway	1:30.61	0:38.49	DNF	-	-
-	Bibiana Perez	Italy	1:30.54	DNS	-	-	-
-	Brynja Þorsteinsdóttir	Iceland	1:34.49	DNF	-	-	-
-	Michaela Dorfmeister	Austria	1:30.10	DNF	-	-	-
-	Pernilla Wiberg	Sweden	1:28.86	DNF	-	-	-
-	Renate Götschl	Austria	1:29.34	DNF	-	-	-
-	Mélanie Turgeon	Canada	DNF	-	-	-	-
-	Trude Gimle	Norway	DNF	-	-	-	-
