= Maríano Puricelli =

Argentine alpine skier (born 1974)

Personal information
- Born: 25 February 1974 (age 51); San Carlos de Bariloche, Argentina

Sport
- Sport: Alpine skiing

Maríano Puricelli (born 25 February 1974) is an Argentine alpine skier. He competed in two events at the 1994 Winter Olympics.
