= Jennifer Taylor =

Jennifer Taylor may refer to:

- Jennifer Taylor (architect) (1935–2015), Australian architect
- Jennifer Taylor (writer) (born 1949), British author
- Jenny Taylor (scientist), British geneticist at the University of Oxford
- Jennifer Taylor (actress) (born 1972), American actress
- Jen Taylor (born 1973), American voice actor
- Jennifer Taylor (skier) (born 1976), Argentinean alpine skier
- Jennifer Taylor (volleyball) (born 1980), British volleyball player
- Jennifer Taylor (Queer As Folk), a character in the American television series Queer as Folk

== See also ==
- Jennifer Taylor-Clarke, fictional character on BBC TV series The Office
- Jen Taylor Friedman
