= Poussier =

Poussier is a surname of French origin. People with the surname include:

- Caroline Poussier (born 1976), Andorran alpine skier
- Marie-Agnès Poussier-Winsback (born 1967), French politician

== See also ==
- Poussieres de vie
