= Ágnes Litter =

Hungarian alpine skier (born 1975)

Personal information
- Nationality: Hungarian
- Born: 8 August 1975 (age 49); Budapest, Hungary

Sport
- Sport: Alpine skiing

Ágnes Litter (born 8 August 1975) is a Hungarian alpine skier. She competed in the women's slalom at the 1994 Winter Olympics.
