= Alenka Dovžan =

Slovenian alpine skier (born 1976)

Medal record

Women's Alpine Skiing

Olympic Games
Bronze medal – third place	1994 Lillehammer	Combined

Alenka Dovžan (born 11 February 1976) is a retired Slovenian alpine skier.

== World Cup results ==
=== Season standings ===
Season	Age	Overall	Slalom	Giant slalom	Super-G	Downhill	Combined
1994	17	13	20	32	4	37	13
1995	18	43	35	37	22	—	10
1996	19						
1997	20	99	52	—	42	—	—
1998	21	38	16	24	—	—	—
1999	22	54	22	35	—	—	—
2000	23	51	17	46	—	—	—
2001	24	61	23	41	—	—	—
2002	25	49	27	25	—	—	—
2003	26	89	—	34	—	—	—

=== Race podiums ===
Season	Date	Location	Race	Position
1994	17 January 1994	Cortina d'Ampezzo, Italy	Super-G	1st

== Olympic Games results ==
Season	Age	Slalom	Giant slalom	Super-G	Downhill	Combined
1994	17	DNF1	DNF2	DNF	16	3
1998	21	16	17	—	—	—
2002	25	17	DNF1	—	—	—

== World Championships results ==
Season	Age	Slalom	Giant slalom	Super-G	Downhill	Combined
1997	20	21	—	—	—	—
1999	22	12	DNF2	—	—	—
2001	24	DNF2	24	—	—	—
2003	26	—	18	—	—	—
