= Katja Seizinger =

German alpine skier

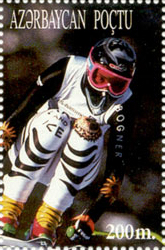
- Seizinger on a stamp from Azerbaijan

Personal information
- Born: 10 May 1972 (age 54) Datteln, North Rhine-Westphalia, West Germany
- Height: 1.71 m (5 ft 7 in)

Skiing career
- Sport: Alpine skiing
- Club: Ski Club Halblech
- Retired: April 1999 – (age 26)
- Disciplines: Downhill, super-G, Giant slalom, slalom, combined
- World Cup debut: 10 December 1989 (age 17)

Olympics
- Teams: 3 – (1992, 1994, 1998)
- Medals: 5 (3 gold)

World Championships
- Teams: 4 – (1991, 1993, 1996, 1997)
- Medals: 4 (1 gold)

World Cup
- Seasons: 9 – (1990–1998)
- Wins: 36 – (16 DH, 16 SG, 4 GS)
- Podiums: 76
- Overall titles: 2 – (1996, 1998)
- Discipline titles: 9 – (4 DH, 5 SG)
Medal record
Women's alpine skiing
Representing Germany
World Cup race podiums
Event	1st	2nd	3rd
Slalom	0	0	1
Giant slalom	4	4	6
Downhill	16	8	8
Super-G	16	8	3
Combined	0	1	1
Total	36	21	19
International competitions
Event	1st	2nd	3rd
Olympic Games	3	0	2
World Championships	1	3	0
World Junior Championships	1	4	1
Total	5	7	3
Olympic Games
Gold medal – first place	1994 Lillehammer	Downhill
Gold medal – first place	1998 Nagano	Downhill
Gold medal – first place	1998 Nagano	Combined
Bronze medal – third place	1992 Albertville	Super-G
Bronze medal – third place	1998 Nagano	Giant slalom
World Championships
Gold medal – first place	1993 Morioka	Super-G
Silver medal – second place	1996 Sierra Nevada	Downhill
Silver medal – second place	1997 Sestriere	Super-G
Silver medal – second place	1997 Sestriere	Combined
Junior World Ski Championships
Gold medal – first place	1990 Zinal	Super-G
Silver medal – second place	1989 Alyeska	Super-G
Silver medal – second place	1990 Zinal	Downhill
Silver medal – second place	1990 Zinal	Giant slalom
Silver medal – second place	1990 Zinal	Combined
Bronze medal – third place	1989 Alyeska	Giant slalom

Katja Seizinger (German pronunciation: [ˈkatja ˈzaɪtsɪŋɐ]; born 10 May 1972) is a German former World Cup alpine ski racing champion. She is her country's most successful alpine skier.

== Biography ==
Born in Datteln, North Rhine-Westphalia, Seizinger won three Olympic gold and two bronze medals, and won eleven World Cup season titles: two overall, four downhill, and five Super-G. She was a three-time winner of Germany's sportswoman of the year award.

With Olympic downhill victories in 1994 and 1998, she was the first to win consecutive Olympic gold medals in the same alpine speed event, and also the first woman to successfully defend an Olympic alpine title.

Seizinger injured both knees while training in June 1998, missed the entire 1999 season, then retired in April.

== World Cup results ==
=== Season standings ===
Season	Age	Overall	Slalom	Giant Slalom	Super-G	Downhill	Combined
1990	17	44	–	39	12	–	21
1991	18	15	–	29	4	13	12
1992	19	3	–	10	3	1	—
1993	20	2	58	7	1	1	7
1994	21	3	49	6	1	1	19
1995	22	2	19	9	1	3	4
1996	23	1	39	2	1	2	—
1997	24	2	19	2	2	5	—
1998	25	1	12	6	1	1	2
1999	26	injured, did not compete					

=== Season titles ===
- 11 titles – (2 overall, 4 DH, 5 SG)

Season	Discipline
1992	Downhill
1993	Downhill
1993	Super-G
1994	Downhill
1994	Super-G
1995	Super-G
1996	Overall
1996	Super-G
1998	Overall
1998	Downhill
1998	Super-G

=== Race victories ===
- 36 wins – (16 DH, 16 SG, 4 GS)

Season	Date	Location	Race
1992	7 Dec 1991	Santa Caterina, Italy	Super-G
1992	11 Jan 1992	Schruns, Austria	Downhill
1992	25 Jan 1992	Morzine, France	Downhill
1992	7 Mar 1992	Vail, USA	Downhill
1993	20 Dec 1992	Lake Louise, Canada	Super-G
1993	15 Jan 1993	Cortina d'Ampezzo, Italy	Downhill
1993	26 Feb 1993	Veysonnaz, Switzerland	Downhill
1993	3 Mar 1993	Morzine, France	Downhill
1993	20 Mar 1993	Vemdalen, Sweden	Giant slalom
1993	20 Mar 1993	Åre, Sweden	Super-G
1994	14 Jan 1994	Cortina d'Ampezzo, Italy	Downhill
1994	15 Jan 1994	Cortina d'Ampezzo, Italy	Super-G
1994	6 Mar 1994	Whistler, Canada	Downhill
1994	9 Mar 1994	Mammoth Mountain, USA	Super-G
1994	16 Mar 1994	Vail, CO, USA	Downhill
1995	11 Dec 1994	Lake Louise, Canada	Super-G
1995	9 Mar 1995	Bormio, Italy	Super-G
1996	5 Dec 1995	St. Anton, Austria	Downhill
1996	6 Jan 1996	Maribor, Slovenia	Giant slalom
1996	13 Jan 1996	Garmisch-Partenkirchen, Germany	Super-G
1996	2 Feb 1996	Val-d'Isère, France	Super-G
1996	3 Feb 1996	Val-d'Isère, France	Downhill
1996	4 Feb 1996	Val-d'Isère, France	Super-G
1996	9 Mar 1996	Hafjell, Norway	Giant slalom
1997	26 Oct 1996	Sölden, Austria	Giant slalom
1997	30 Nov 1996	Lake Louise, Canada	Downhill
1997	7 Mar 1997	Mammoth Mountain, USA	Super-G
1997	13 Mar 1997	Vail, USA	Super-G
1998	29 Nov 1997	Mammoth Mountain, USA	Super-G
1998	4 Dec 1997	Lake Louise, Canada	Downhill
1998	5 Dec 1997	Lake Louise, Canada	Downhill
1998	6 Dec 1997	Lake Louise, Canada	Super-G
1998	17 Dec 1997	Val d'Isère, France	Downhill
1998	18 Dec 1997	Val d'Isère, France	Super-G
1998	24 Jan 1998	Cortina d'Ampezzo, Italy	Super-G
1998	31 Jan 1998	Åre, Sweden	Downhill

== World Championship results ==
Year	Age	Slalom	Giant Slalom	Super-G	Downhill	Combined
1991	18	—	—	20	5	5
1993	20	—	12	1	4	DNF DH
1996	23	—	5	DNF	2	5
1997	24	—	5	2	5	2
1999	26	injured, did not compete				

== Olympic results ==
Year	Age	Slalom	Giant Slalom	Super-G	Downhill	Combined
1992	19	—	8	3	4	DNF SL2
1994	21	—	DNF2	DNF	1	DNF SL1
1998	25	—	3	6	1	1

== See also ==
- List of FIS Alpine Ski World Cup women's race winners

Awards
Preceded by Franziska van Almsick	German Sportswoman of the Year; 1994	Succeeded by Franziska van Almsick
Preceded by Franziska van Almsick	German Sportswoman of the Year; 1996	Succeeded by Astrid Kumbernuss
Preceded by Astrid Kumbernuss	German Sportswoman of the Year; 1998	Succeeded by Steffi Graf
