= Martin Hansson (skier) =

Swedish alpine skier (born 1975)

Personal information
- Full name: Lars Martin Hansson
- Nationality: Sweden
- Born: 12 March 1975 (age 51) Frösön, Sweden

Sport
- Sport: Skiing

Lars Martin Hansson (born 12 March 1975, Frösön) is a Swedish former alpine skier who competed in the 1998 Winter Olympics and in the 2006 Winter Olympics. He was Swedish national junior slalom champion in 1994. He is the younger brother of fellow alpine skier Erika Hansson.
