= Éva Koch =

Hungarian alpine skier (born 1975)

Personal information
- Nationality: Hungarian
- Born: 18 January 1975 (age 51) Sopron, Hungary

Sport
- Sport: Alpine skiing

Éva Koch (born 18 January 1975) is a Hungarian alpine skier. She competed in the women's giant slalom at the 1994 Winter Olympics.
