= Dominique Ezquerra =

Argentine alpine skier (born 1977)

Personal information
- Born: 5 March 1977 (age 49) San Carlos de Bariloche, Argentina

Sport
- Sport: Alpine skiing

Dominique Ezquerra (born 5 March 1977) is an Argentine alpine skier. She competed in the women's super-G at the 1994 Winter Olympics.
