= Edda Mutter =

German alpine skier (born 1970)

Edda Mutter (born 29 June 1970 in West Berlin) is a German former alpine skier who competed in the women's slalom at the 1994 Winter Olympics.
