= Maria Zaruc =

Romanian alpine skier (born 1977)

Personal information
- Nationality: Romanian
- Born: 2 March 1977 (age 48); Miercurea Ciuc, Romania

Sport
- Sport: Alpine skiing

Maria Zaruc (born 2 March 1977) is a Romanian alpine skier. She competed in two events at the 1994 Winter Olympics.
