= Megan Gerety =

American alpine skier (born 1971)

Megan Gerety (born October 14, 1971) is a former World Cup alpine ski racer from Anchorage, Alaska. A specialist in the speed events, she competed in the 1994 Winter Olympics in Lillehammer, Norway. After retiring from competition, Gerety and longtime boyfriend Tommy Moe, an Olympic gold medalist in the 1994 Winter Olympic Games, married in 2003. They have two daughters and live in Wilson, Wyoming.
