= Khrystyna Podrushna =

Ukrainian alpine skier (born 1977)

Personal information
- Nationality: Ukrainian
- Born: 12 August 1977 (age 47); Lviv, Ukrainian SSR, Soviet Union

Sport
- Sport: Alpine skiing

Khrystyna Podrushna (born 12 August 1977) is a Ukrainian alpine skier. She competed in two events at the 1994 Winter Olympics.
