= Katja Koren =

Slovenian alpine skier (born 1975)

Personal information
- Born: 6 August 1975 (age 50) Maribor, Slovenia

Skiing career
- Sport: Alpine skiing
- Retired: 1998
- Disciplines: Polyvalent
- World Cup debut: 1993

Olympics
- Teams: 1
- Medals: 1

World Championships
- Teams: 2

World Cup
- Seasons: 6
Medal record
Women's alpine skiing
Representing Slovenia
Bronze medal – third place	1994 Lillehammer	Slalom

Katja Koren Miklavec (born 6 August 1975) is a former Slovenian alpine skier.

== Career ==
Born in Maribor, she won a bronze medal in the 1994 Winter Olympics in Lillehammer. She took her sole World Cup win at the age of 18 in a Super-G in Flachau in December 1993, taking victory from a bib number of 66, a few days after Markus Foser had won at Val Gardena with the same start number. Koren was the first woman to take an Alpine Ski World Cup win for Slovenia, a couple of days after Jure Košir became the first man to win a World Cup race for Slovenia as an independent nation in Madonna di Campiglio.

She retired from skiing in 1998, due to a spinal injury.

Since 2008, she has been active in politics, and has run twice on the electoral lists of the Slovenian Democratic Party.

== World Cup results ==
=== Season standings ===
Season	Age	Overall	Slalom	Giant slalom	Super-G	Downhill	Combined
1994	18	12	11	49	6	44	16
1995	19	24	10	21	43	—	—
1996	20	36	13	27	—	—	—
1997	21	64	33	28	—	—	—

=== Race podiums ===
- 1 win (1 SG)
- 5 podiums (4 SL, 1 SG)

Season	Date	Location	Discipline	Position
1994	22 December 1993	Flachau, Austria	Super-G	1st
1994	10 March 1994	Mammoth Mountain, United States	Slalom	2nd
1994	20 March 1994	Vail, United States	Slalom	2nd
1995	26 February 1995	Maribor, Slovenia	Slalom	2nd
1996	17 December 1995	St. Anton, Austria	Slalom	3rd

== Olympic Games results ==
Season	Age	Slalom	Giant slalom	Super-G	Downhill	Combined
1994	18	3	DNF1	7	10	6

== World Championships results ==
Season	Age	Slalom	Giant slalom	Super-G	Downhill	Combined
1996	20	DNF1	19	32	—	9
1997	21	DNF2	DNF2	—	—	—
