= Véronique Dugailly =

Belgian alpine skier (born 1967)

Personal information
- Nationality: Belgian
- Born: 1 August 1967 (age 57); Uccle, Belgium

Sport
- Sport: Alpine skiing

Véronique Dugailly (born 1 August 1967) is a Belgian alpine skier. She competed in two events at the 1994 Winter Olympics.
