= FIS Alpine World Ski Championships 1991 =

Skiing event in Saalbach-Hinterglemm, Austria

Coordinates: 47.390°N 12.637°E

- Host city: Saalbach-Hinterglemm, Salzburg, Austria
- Events: 10
- Opening: 22 January 1991
- Closing: 3 February 1991
- Opened by: Kurt Waldheim

Location in the Alps of Europe
Location in Austria

The FIS Alpine World Ski Championships 1991 were held in Saalbach-Hinterglemm, Austria between 22 January and 3 February, 1991.

Sunshine often hit the snow of Saalbach-Hinterglemm during the competitions, which are remembered as some of the sunniest ever. The competitions also saw the international breakthroughs for skiers who would score major successes throughout the 1990s, like Austria's Stephan Eberharter, and Sweden's Pernilla Wiberg.

The United States Ski Team arrived late, after two races had been completed. Due to the Gulf War and associated security concerns, the team had withdrawn from World Cup competitions the previous week and returned home to North America.

The World Championships returned to Saalbach 34 years later in 2025.

== Men's competitions ==
=== Downhill ===
Sunday, 27 January 1991

Placing	Country	Athlete	Time
1	(Switzerland)	Franz Heinzer	1:54.91
2	(Italy)	Peter Runggaldier	1:55.16
3	(Switzerland)	Daniel Mahrer	1:55.57

=== Super-G ===
Wednesday, 23 January 1991

Placing	Country	Athlete	Time
1	(Austria)	Stephan Eberharter	1:26.73
2	(Norway)	Kjetil André Aamodt	1:28.27
3	(France)	Franck Piccard	1:28.55

=== Giant Slalom ===
Sunday, 3 February 1991

Placing	Country	Athlete	Time	Run 1	Run 2
1	(Austria)	Rudolf Nierlich	2:29.94	1:16.73	1:13.21
2	(Switzerland)	Urs Kälin	2:30.29	1:17.59	1:12.70
3	(Sweden)	Johan Wallner	2:30.73	1:17.31	1:13.42

=== Slalom ===
Tuesday, 22 January 1991

Placing	Country	Athlete	Time	Run 1	Run 2
1	(Luxembourg)	Marc Girardelli	1:55.38	57.96	57.42
2	(Austria)	Thomas Stangassinger	1:55.96	58.64	57.32
3	(Norway)	Ole Kristian Furuseth	1:56.00	58.92	57.08

=== Combination ===
Monday, 28 January 1991 (downhill)
Wednesday, 30 January 1991 (2 slalom runs)

Placing	Country	Athlete	Points
1	(Austria)	Stephan Eberharter	16.28
2	(Italy)	Kristian Ghedina	26.41
3	(Austria)	Günther Mader	27.54

== Women's competitions ==
=== Downhill ===
Saturday, 26 January 1991

Placing	Country	Athlete	Time
1	(Austria)	Petra Kronberger	1:29.12
2	(France)	Nathalie Bouvier	1:29.56
3	(Soviet Union)	Svetlana Gladisheva	1:29.63

=== Super G ===
Tuesday, 29 January 1991

Placing	Country	Athlete	Time
1	(Austria)	Ulrike Maier	1:08.72
2	(France)	Carole Merle	1:08.83
3	(Austria)	Anita Wachter	1:08.85

=== Giant Slalom ===
Saturday, 2 February 1991

Placing	Country	Athlete	Time	Run 1	Run 2
1	(Sweden)	Pernilla Wiberg	2:07.45	1:04.50	1:02.95
2	(Austria)	Ulrike Maier	2:07.61	1:03.41	1:04.20
3	(Germany)	Traudl Hächer	2:08.03	1:04.05	1:03.98

=== Slalom ===
Friday, 1 February 1991

Placing	Country	Athlete	Time	Run 1	Run 2
1	(Switzerland)	Vreni Schneider	1:25.90	41.97	43.93
2	(Socialist Federal Republic of Yugoslavia)	Nataša Bokal	1:26.06	43.00	43.06
3	(Austria)	Ingrid Salvenmoser	1:26.56	42.35	44.21

=== Combination ===
Friday, 25 January 1991 (downhill)
Thursday, 31 January 1991 (2 slalom runs)

Placing	Country	Athlete	Time
1	(Switzerland)	Chantal Bournissen	26.45
2	(Austria)	Ingrid Stöckl	33.76
3	(Switzerland)	Vreni Schneider	42.13

== Medals table ==
Place	Nation	Gold	Silver	Bronze	Total
1	Austria	5	3	3	11
2	Switzerland	3	1	2	6
3	Sweden	1	-	1	2
4	Luxembourg	1	-	-	1
5	France	-	2	1	3
6	Italy	-	2	-	2
7	Norway	-	1	1	2
8	Yugoslavia	-	1	-	1
9	Germany	-	-	1	1
	Soviet Union	-	-	1	1
