= Carola Calello =

Argentine alpine skier (born 1977)

Personal information
- Born: 12 July 1977 (age 47); San Carlos de Bariloche, Argentina

Sport
- Sport: Alpine skiing

Carola Calello (born 12 July 1977) is an Argentine alpine skier. She competed at the 1994 Winter Olympics and the 1998 Winter Olympics.
