= Elfi Eder =

Austrian alpine skier (born 1970)

Medal record

Women's alpine skiing

Olympic Games
Silver medal – second place	1994 Hafjell	Slalom

World Championships
Bronze medal – third place	1993 Morioka	Slalom

Elfriede "Elfi" Eder (born 5 January 1970 in Leogang) is a former alpine skier from Austria.

She represented the Caribbean island of Grenada from 1998 to 1999, having previously competed for Austria.

The alpine skier Sylvia Eder is her elder sister.

== World Cup victories ==
Date	Location	Race
18 November 1995	(United States) Vail	Slalom
17 December 1995	(Austria) St. Anton	Slalom
30 December 1995	(Austria) Semmering	Slalom
