= Nathalie Bouvier =

French alpine skier

Medal record

Women's alpine skiing

World Championships
Silver medal – second place	1991 Saalbach-Hinterglemm	Downhill

Nathalie Bouvier (born August 31, 1969 in Les Rousses) is a retired French alpine skier. She won a controversial World Cup victory in 1989, in Giant Slalom.

Bouvier also earned a silver medal at the FIS Alpine World Ski Championships 1991 for Downhill skiing, which she lost by only 0.44 second.

== World Cup victories ==
Date	Location	Race
November 24, 1989	(United States) Park City	Giant Slalom
