= Karin Buder =

Austrian alpine skier (born 1964)

Medal record

Women's alpine skiing

World Championships
Gold medal – first place	1993 Morioka	Slalom

Karin Buder (born 28 July 1964) is an Austrian former alpine skier.

Born in Sankt Gallen, Styria, she won the gold medal in slalom at the 1993 Alpine skiing World Championship in Morioka, Japan. She retired immediately afterwards.

In the World Cup she won one slalom race in 1990.

== World Cup victories ==
Date	Location	Race
11 March 1990	Stranda, Norway	Slalom
