= Nataliya Buga =

Russian alpine skier (born 1971)

Nataliya Buga (born 27 April 1971 in Kamchatka Krai, Russia) is a retired Russian alpine skier who competed in the 1994 Winter Olympics, where she finished 34th in the women's super-G and 35th in the women's downhill.
