= Anja Haas =

Austrian alpine skier (born 1971)

Medal record

Women's alpine skiing

World Championships
Bronze medal – third place	1993 Morioka	Downhill

Anja Haas (born 30 May 1971 in Gerlos) is a retired Austrian alpine skier. She competed in two events at the 1994 Winter Olympics.

== World Cup victories ==
Date	Location	Race
24 February 1991	(Japan) Furano	Downhill
27 February 1993	(Switzerland) Veysonnaz	Downhill
18 December 1993	(Austria) St. Anton	Downhill
