= Ingrid Stöckl =

Austrian alpine skier (born 1969)

Medal record

Women's alpine skiing

World Championships
Silver medal – second place	1991 Saalbach-Hinterglemm	Combined

Ingrid Stöckl (born 28 March 1969 in Tamsweg) is a former Austrian alpine skier. She won a silver medal in the Combined event at the 1991 World Championships. She competed in two events at the 1994 Winter Olympics.

== World Cup victories ==
Date	Location	Race
22 December 1990	(France) Morzine	Combined
