= Mónica Bosch =

Spanish alpine skier (born 1972)

Mónica Bosch Forrellad (born 9 September 1972) is a Spanish former alpine skier who competed in the 1994 Winter Olympics and in the 1998 Winter Olympics.
