= Francisca Steverlynck =

Argentine alpine skier (born 1974)

Personal information
- Born: 8 April 1974 (age 51) Buenos Aires, Argentina
- Occupation: Architect

Sport
- Sport: Alpine skiing

Francisca Steverlynck (born 8 April 1974) is an Argentine alpine skier. She competed in three events at the 1994 Winter Olympics.

She graduated as an architect at FADU - UBA (Facultad de Arquitectura y Urbanismo Universidad de Buenos Aires) in 2000. She established Steverlynck+Iglesias Molli Arquitectos (SIM Arquitectos) in 2011 in Buenos Aires, Argentina.

== Family ==
She is the daughter of María Cristina Schweizer (20 August 1940 – 1994), an Argentine alpine skier who competed at the 1960 Winter Olympics and 1964 Winter Olympics, and of Xavier Steverlynck.

She is the granddaughter of Julio Steverlynck (born Jules Steverlynck; 4 October 1895 – 28 November 1975), a Belgian-born Argentine industrialist who founded the textile company Algodonera Flandria in 1926. He was the first employer in Argentina to introduce European-style social benefits such as paid vacations, year-end bonuses, and production awards, and he developed the area surrounding his factory by building housing, a health center, and social clubs.
