= Isolde Kostner =

Italian alpine skier

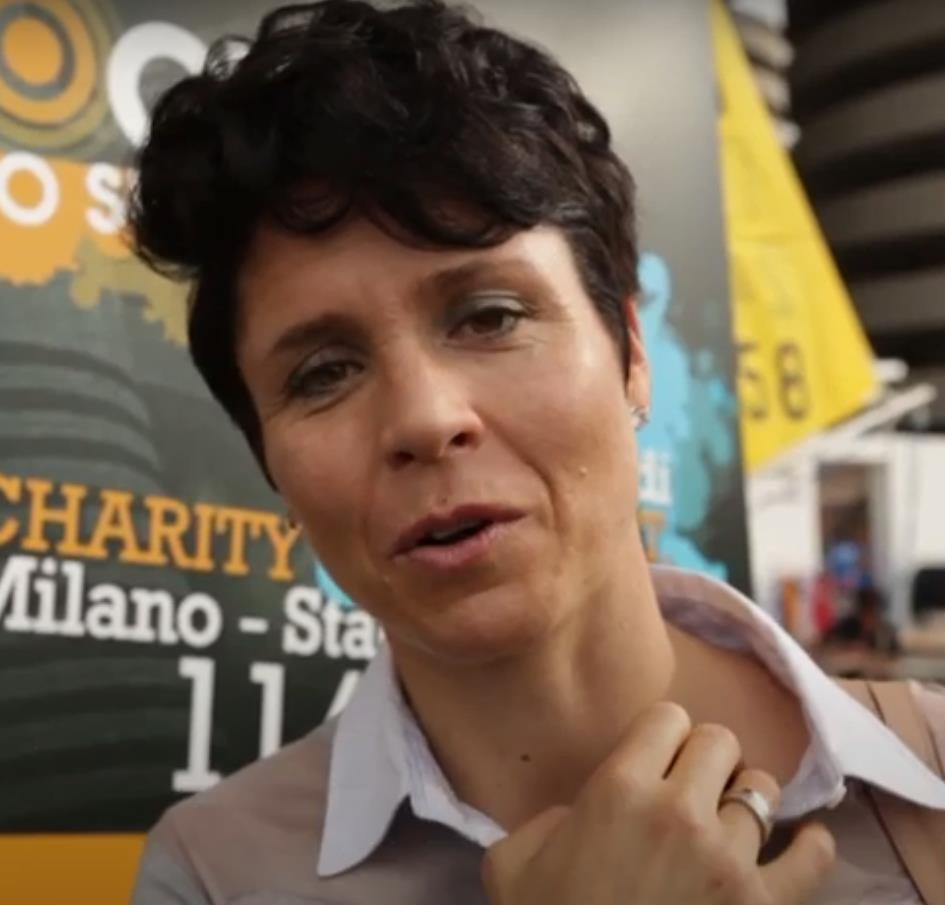
- Kostner in 2014 at the age of 39.

Personal information
- Born: 20 March 1975 (age 51) Bolzano, Italy
- Height: 1.71 m (5 ft 7 in)

Skiing career
- Sport: Alpine skiing
- Club: G.S. Fiamme Gialle
- Retired: 2006
- Disciplines: Speed events
- World Cup debut: 1992

Olympics
- Teams: 3
- Medals: 3 (0 gold)

World Championships
- Teams: 6
- Medals: 3 (2 gold)

World Cup
- Seasons: 15
- Wins: 15
- Podiums: 51
- Overall titles: 0
- Discipline titles: 2
Medal record
Women's alpine skiing
Representing Italy
International alpine ski competitions
Event	1st	2nd	3rd
Olympic Games	0	1	2
World Championships	2	1	0
World Junior Championships	1	0	0
Total	3	2	2
World Cup race podiums
Event	1st	2nd	3rd
Downhill	12	13	10
Super-G	3	5	7
Giant slalom	0	0	1
Total	15	18	18
Olympic Games
Silver medal – second place	2002 Salt Lake City	Downhill
Bronze medal – third place	1994 Lillehammer	Super-G
Bronze medal – third place	1994 Lillehammer	Downhill
World Championships
Gold medal – first place	1996 Sierra Nevada	Super-G
Gold medal – first place	1997 Sestrière	Super-G
Silver medal – second place	2001 St. Anton	Super-G

Isolde Kostner (born 20 March 1975) is an Italian former Alpine skier who won two bronze medals at the 1994 Winter Olympics and a silver medal at the 2002 Winter Olympics. She was the Italian flag bearer at the opening ceremony of the 2002 Olympics.

== Biography ==
Kostner won two gold medals in Super-G at the Alpine Ski World Championships in 1996 and 1997, and in 2001 and 2002 she won the World Cup discipline title in Downhill. Her first World Cup win was in the downhill on 29 January 1994, at Garmisch-Partenkirchen this was, however, overshadowed by the death of Ulrike Maier on the same day.

Kostner was born in Bolzano. Her cousin and goddaughter is Carolina Kostner, the 2012 World champion and 2014 Olympic bronze medalist in figure skating. She announced her retirement on 10 January 2006.

== World Cup results ==
=== Overall victories ===
Season	Discipline
2001	Downhill
2002	Downhill

=== Individual victories ===
Date	Location	Race
29 January 1994	Garmisch-Partenkirchen, Germany	Downhill
20 January 1996	Cortina d'Ampezzo, Italy	Downhill
24 January 1997	Cortina d'Ampezzo, Italy	Downhill
25 January 1997	Cortina d'Ampezzo, Italy	Super-G
24 January 1998	Cortina d'Ampezzo, Italy	Downhill
27 November 1999	Lake Louise, Canada	Downhill
8 December 1999	Val d'Isère, France	Super-G
17 December 1999	Saint Moritz, Switzerland	Downhill
10 February 2000	Santa Caterina Valfurva, Italy	Downhill
2 December 2000	Lake Louise, Canada	Downhill
19 January 2001	Cortina d'Ampezzo, Italy	Downhill
24 February 2001	Lenzerheide, Switzerland	Super-G
29 November 2001	Lake Louise, Canada	Downhill
30 November 2001	Lake Louise, Canada	Downhill
31 January 2004	Haus im Ennstal, Austria	Downhill

=== Season standings ===
Season
Season	Age	Overall	Slalom	Giant; Slalom	Super G	Downhill	Combined
1994	19	19	—	—	16	4	—
1995	20	20	—	33	32	5	—
1996	21	4	—	11	4	3	—
1997	22	5	—	16	4	6	—
1998	23	8	—	21	3	3	—
1999	24	14	—	50	14	5	—
2000	25	4	—	32	5	3	11
2001	26	6	—	41	6	1st place, gold medalist(s)	—
2002	27	6	—	27	38	1st place, gold medalist(s)	—
2003	28	35	—	—	17	19	—
2004	29	15	—	46	23	4	—N/a
2005	30	21	—	—	14	14	25
2006	31	83	—	—	41	48	—

== See also ==
- Italian sportswomen multiple medalists at Olympics and World Championships
- Italy national alpine ski at the World championships
- Italian skiers who closed in top 10 in overall World Cup
- Italian skiers with the most podiums in the World Cup

Winter Olympics
Preceded by Gerda Weissensteiner	Flag bearer for Italy; 2002 Salt Lake City	Succeeded by Carolina Kostner
