= Jennifer Taylor (skier) =

Argentine alpine skier (born 1976)

Personal information
- Born: 26 January 1976 (age 50) San Martín de los Andes, Argentina

Sport
- Sport: Alpine skiing

Jennifer Taylor (born 26 January 1976) is an Argentinean alpine skier. She competed in the downhill and combined events at the 1994 Winter Olympics and finished in 44th and 25th place, respectively.
