= Szvetlana Keszthelyi =

Hungarian alpine skier (born 1971)

Personal information
- Nationality: Hungarian
- Born: 11 August 1971 (age 53); Kirovohrad, Soviet Union

Sport
- Sport: Alpine skiing

Szvetlana Keszthelyi (born 11 August 1971) is a Hungarian alpine skier. She competed in four events at the 1994 Winter Olympics.
