= Ainhoa Ibarra =

Spanish alpine skier (born 1968)

Guruzne Ainhoa Ibarra Astelarra (Note: In this Spanish name, the first or paternal surname is Ibarra and the second or maternal family name is Astellara.) (born 27 October 1968 in Guernica) is a Spanish former alpine skier who competed in the 1988 Winter Olympics, 1992 Winter Olympics, 1994 Winter Olympics, and 1998 Winter Olympics. Her best result was the 17th position in the giant slalom in Lillehammer 1994. She was the flag bearer for Spain in the opening ceremonies of the 1988 and 1994 Winter Olympics.

She disputed four World Championships, and her best result was the 8th position in the giant slalom in Sierra Nevada 1996.

In the World Cup, she finished top-10 once.
