= Ásta Halldórsdóttir =

Icelandic alpine skier (born 1970)

Personal information
- Nationality: Icelandic
- Born: 27 November 1970 (age 54); Ísafjörður, Iceland

Sport
- Sport: Alpine skiing

Ásta Halldórsdóttir (born 27 November 1970) is an Icelandic alpine skier. She competed at the 1992 Winter Olympics and the 1994 Winter Olympics. In both Albertville and Lillehammer she was the ensign of the Icelandic team.
