= Gabriela Quijano =

Argentine alpine skier (born 1975)

Personal information
- Born: 11 April 1975 (age 51) San Carlos de Bariloche, Argentina

Sport
- Sport: Alpine skiing

Gabriela Quijano (born 11 April 1975) is an Argentine alpine skier. She competed in four events at the 1994 Winter Olympics.
