= Caroline Poussier =

Andorran alpine skier (born 1976)

Personal information
- Nationality: Andorran
- Born: 13 July 1976 (age 50)

Sport
- Sport: Alpine skiing

Caroline Poussier (born 13 July 1976) is an Andorran alpine skier. She competed in two events at the 1994 Winter Olympics.
