= Caroline Gedde-Dahl =

Norwegian alpine skier (born 1973)

Personal information
- Born: 3 November 1973 (age 51); Oslo, Norway

Sport
- Sport: Alpine skiing

Vibecke Caroline Gedde-Dahl (born 3 November 1973) is a Norwegian alpine skier. She was born in Oslo. She competed at the 1994 Winter Olympics.
