= Mira Golub =

Russian alpine skier (born 1975)

Mira Golub (born 24 September 1975, Yelizovo, Kamchatka Oblast, Soviet Union) is a Russian former alpine skier who competed in the 1994 Winter Olympics.
