= Kate Pace =

Canadian alpine skier (born 1969)

Personal information
- Full name: Kate Pace Lindsay
- Born: Kate Pace; February 13, 1969 (age 57) North Bay, Ontario, Canada

Skiing career
- Sport: Alpine skiing ♂
- Retired: 1998
- Disciplines: Downhill, Super G
- World Cup debut: December 16, 1990

Olympics
- Teams: 2

World Championships
- Teams: 3
- Medals: 1 (1 gold)

World Cup
- Wins: 2
- Podiums: 5
Medal record
World Ski Championships
Gold medal – first place	1993 Japan	Downhill

Kate Pace (born February 13, 1969), also known as Kate Pace Lindsay, is a Canadian retired alpine skier.

Born in North Bay, Ontario, she won six World Cup medals and three Canadian downhill championships. She finished 1st place in the downhill event at the 1993 FIS Alpine World Ski Championships. She finished 14th at the 1994 Alpine Skiing World Cup.

She was a member of the national team at the 1994 Winter Olympics and the 1998 Winter Olympics.

She retired in 1998. She is married to Mark Lindsay, a chiropractor.

In 1993, she was awarded the Velma Springstead Trophy and the Bobbie Rosenfeld Award.

A 12-kilometre (7.5 mi) pathway, the Kate Pace Way, located in North Bay, Ontario is named in her honour. It is a multi-use trail for walking, jogging, cycling, and inline skating.
