= Mélanie Suchet =

French alpine skier (born 1976)

Mélanie Suchet (born 1 September 1976 in Moûtiers) is a French former alpine skier who competed in the 1994 Winter Olympics, 1998 Winter Olympics, and 2002 Winter Olympics.
