= Miriam Vogt =

German alpine skier (born 1967)

Medal record

Women's alpine skiing

Representing Germany

World Championships
Gold medal – first place	1993 Morioka	Combined

Miriam Vogt (born 20 March 1967 in Starnberg, West Germany) is a former alpine skier who won the gold medal in the women's combined event at the 1993 World Championships in Morioka, Japan.

She retired from competition in 1998 and became President of the Bavarian Ski Federation (BSV) in 2005.
