= Svetlana Gladysheva =

Russian alpine skier (born 1971)

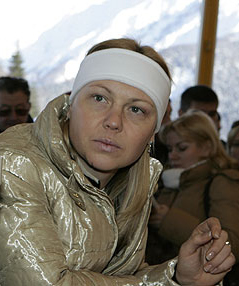
- Gladysheva in 2008

Personal information
- Born: 13 September 1971 (age 54) Ufa, Russian SFSR, Soviet Union
- Height: 170 cm (5 ft 7 in)
- Weight: 73 kg (161 lb)

Sport
- Sport: Alpine skiing
- Club: Sukolovo Moscow
Medal record
Representing Russia
Olympic Games
Silver medal – second place	1994 Lillehammer	Super G
World Championships
Representing Soviet Union
Bronze medal – third place	1991 Saalbach	Downhill

Svetlana Alekseyevna Gladysheva (Russian: Светлана Алексеевна Гладышева, born 13 September 1971) is a retired Russian alpine skier. In her early career she had her best results in the downhill, becoming the junior world champion in 1990, and finishing third at the seniors world championships in 1991 and at the world cups in 1991 and 1992. Later she was more successful in super-G competitions, winning a world cup in 1996, and an Olympic silver medal in 1994. She also competed at the 1992, 1994 and 1998 Olympics in the downhill and super-G events and finished fifth in 1998 and eighth in 1992 in the downhill. Gladysheva retired from competitions in 1998, and in 2010 became president of the Russian Alpine Skiing and Snowboarding Federation.
