= Olha Lohinova =

Ukrainian alpine skier (born 1966)

Personal information
- Nationality: Ukrainian
- Born: 3 February 1966 (age 59); Beloretsk, Russian SFSR, Soviet Union

Sport
- Sport: Alpine skiing

Olha Lohinova (born 3 February 1966) is a Ukrainian alpine skier. She competed in five events at the 1994 Winter Olympics.
