= María José Rienda =

Spanish alpine skier

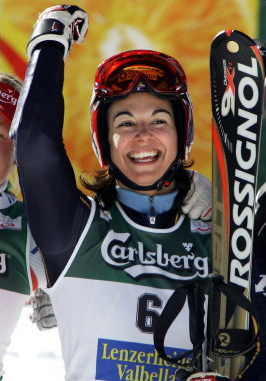

Personal information
- Born: María José Rienda Contreras; 29 June 1975 (age 51) Granada, Spain

Skiing career
- Sport: Alpine skiing
- Retired: 2011
- Disciplines: Technical events
- World Cup debut: 1994

Olympics
- Teams: 5
- Medals: 6th Giant slalom (2002)

World Championships
- Teams: 7
- Medals: 9th Giant slalom (1997, 2005)

World Cup
- Seasons: 17
- Wins: 6
- Podiums: 11
- Discipline titles: 2nd Giant slalom (2006)
Medal record
Women's alpine skiing
Representing Spain
World Cup race podiums
Event	1st	2nd	3rd
Giant slalom	6	1	4

María José Rienda Contreras (born 29 June 1975) is a former World Cup alpine ski racer. She served as the President of the Consejo Superior de Deportes and Secretary of State for Sports of Spain from June 2018 to January 2020.

== Biography ==
Rienda Contreras has 6 World Cup victories, all in giant slalom. Her victories in 2005 were the first Spanish World Cup victories since Blanca Fernández Ochoa won in December 1991. María José Rienda Contreras represented Spain in five Winter Olympics.

Her interest for this sport began when her father began to work on the Station of Sierra Nevada already at the age of nine she was possessing her first pair of skis. After some national success, she joined the Spanish national team at age 14. On 25 October 2003 Rienda Contreras scored her first World Cup podium, by coming third in the giant slalom in Sölden, Austria. She scored two more podiums that season and finished third in the giant slalom World Cup that season.

The following season, 2004–2005, began with a new podium, repeating the third position of the previous year in Sölden. Later she scored another third position, now in St. Moritz, Switzerland. On 20 February 2005 Maria Jose Rienda Contreras scored her first World Cup win, in the giant slalom in Åre, Sweden. Later she scored another victory, this time in the giant slalom in Lenzerheide, Switzerland. Also this season she finished third in the giant slalom World Cup standings.

After retiring from competition, she became involved in sport management. In June 2018 she was appointed Secretary of State for Sports by the Spanish government.

== World Cup victories ==
Date	Location	Country	Discipline
20 February 2005	Åre	Sweden	Giant slalom
13 March 2005	Lenzerheide	Switzerland	Giant slalom
10 December 2005	Aspen	United States	Giant slalom
3 February 2006	Ofterschwang	Germany	Giant slalom
4 February 2006	Ofterschwang	Germany	Giant slalom
5 March 2006	Hafjell	Norway	Giant slalom

Olympic Games
Preceded by Íker Fernández	Flagbearer for Spain; Turin 2006	Succeeded by Queralt Castellet
