= Bibiana Perez =

Italian alpine skier (born 1970)

Personal information
- Born: 31 October 1970 (age 56) Sterzing, Italy

Skiing career
- Sport: Alpine skiing
- Disciplines: Giant slalom, super-G, combined, downhill, slalom

World Cup
- Wins: 1
- Podiums: 6
Medal record
World Cup race podiums
Event	1st	2nd	3rd
Super-G	0	2	0
Downhill	0	0	1
Combined	1	0	2
Total	1	2	3

Bibiana Perez (born 31 October 1970) is an Italian former alpine skier who competed in the 1992 Winter Olympics, 1994 Winter Olympics, and 1998 Winter Olympics.
