= Erika Hansson =

Swedish alpine skier (born 1973)

Personal information
- Nationality: Sweden
- Born: 2 July 1973 (age 53) Hedemora, Sweden

Sport
- Sport: Skiing

Erika Hansson (born 2 July 1973) is a Swedish former alpine skier who competed in the 1994 Winter Olympics. She is the older sister of fellow alpine skier Martin Hansson.
