= Martina Ertl =

German alpine skier (born 1973)

Personal information
- Born: 12 September 1973 (age 52) Bad Tölz, Upper Bavaria, West Germany
- Height: 1.65 m (5 ft 5 in)

Skiing career
- Sport: Alpine skiing
- Club: SC Lenggries
- Retired: 2006
- Disciplines: Technical and speed events
- World Cup debut: 1992

Olympics
- Teams: 5
- Medals: 3 (0 gold)

World Championships
- Teams: 7
- Medals: 4 (2 gold)

World Cup
- Seasons: 15
- Wins: 14
- Podiums: 57
- Overall titles: 0 – (2nd in 1996 and 1998)
- Discipline titles: 2 – (GS, 1996, 1998)
Medal record
Olympic Games
Silver medal – second place	1994 Lillehammer	Giant slalom
Silver medal – second place	1998 Nagano	Combined
Bronze medal – third place	2002 Salt Lake City	Combined
World Championships
Gold medal – first place	2001 St. Anton	Combined
Gold medal – first place	2005 Bormio	Team event
Bronze medal – third place	1993 Morioka	Giant slalom
Bronze medal – third place	1996 Sierra Nevada	Giant slalom
World Cup race podiums
Event	1st	2nd	3rd
Slalom	2	4	5
Giant slalom	10	8	4
Super-G	2	8	7
Downhill	0	0	1
Combined	0	3	2
Parallel	0	1	0
Total	14	24	19

Martina Maria Ertl-Renz (born 12 September 1973) is a German former alpine skier. She was two times world champion and also won several medals at Olympic Winter Games and World Championships.

== Biography ==
Martina Ertl is the sister of the German alpine ski Andreas Ertl.

== Skiing career ==
Ertl started skiing at the age of two and a half. At the age of 18 she participated in the Junior World Championship in Hemsedal (Norway) winning a silver medal in Giant slalom and a bronze medal in Combined.

This was the starting point of a long career. Until 2006 she took part in 430 World Cup races winning 14 of them. Ertl won the giant slalom World Cup in 1996 and 1998. She won three Olympic medals and four medals at World Championships (Bronze in giant slalom at Morioka 1993, Bronze medalist in giant slalom at Sierra Nevada 1996, Gold in Combined at St. Anton 2001, Gold in Nation Team Event at Bormio 2005).

She represented Germany at five Winter Olympics between 1992 and 2006, winning silver medals in the giant slalom in 1994 and the combined event in 1998, as well as a bronze medal in the combined event in 2002.

== World Cup victories ==
=== Overall ===
1996	Giant slalom
1998	Giant slalom

=== Individual races ===
Date	Location	Race
19 March 1994	(United States) Vail	Giant slalom
15 January 1995	(Germany) Garmisch-Partenkirchen	Slalom
18 March 1995	(Slovenia) Maribor	Giant slalom
25 November 1995	(United States) Vail	Super-G
11 December 1995	(France) Val-d'Isère	Giant slalom
21 December 1995	(Switzerland) Veysonnaz	Giant slalom
5 January 1996	(Slovenia) Maribor	Giant slalom
10 January 1998	(Italy) Bormio	Giant slalom
15 January 1998	(Austria) Altenmarkt	Super-G
25 January 1998	(Italy) Cortina d'Ampezzo	Giant slalom
28 January 1998	(Sweden) Åre	Giant slalom
1 March 1998	(Austria) Saalbach	Slalom
28 October 2000	(Austria) Sölden	Giant slalom
25 October 2003	(Austria) Sölden	Giant slalom
