= FIS Alpine World Ski Championships 1993 =

Skiing event in Shizukuishi, Japan

Coordinates: 39.784°N 140.937°E

- Host city: Morioka
- Country: Japan
- Events: 10
- Opening: 4 February 1993
- Closing: 14 February 1993
- Opened by: Akihito
- Main venue: Shizukuishi ski area

Location in Japan

The FIS Alpine World Ski Championships 1993 were held 4–14 February in Japan at Shizukuishi ski area, northwest of Morioka, the capital of Iwate Prefecture. The men's Super-G race was cancelled due to persistent bad weather and the title went unassigned.

== Men's competitions ==
=== Downhill ===
Date: February 5

Placing	Country	Athlete	Time
1	(Switzerland)	Urs Lehmann	1:32.06
2	(Norway)	Atle Skårdal	1:32.66
3	(United States)	A. J. Kitt	1:32.98

=== Super-G ===
Unassigned.

=== Giant Slalom ===
Date: February 10

Placing	Country	Athlete	Time	Run 1	Run 2
1	(Norway)	Kjetil André Aamodt	2:15.36	1:07.69	1:07.67
2	(Austria)	Rainer Salzgeber	2:16.23	1:08.14	1:08.09
3	(Sweden)	Johan Wallner	2:17.27	1:09.18	1:08.09

=== Slalom ===
Date: February 13

Placing	Country	Athlete	Time	Run 1	Run 2
1	(Norway)	Kjetil André Aamodt	1:40.33	49.88	50.45
2	(Luxembourg)	Marc Girardelli	1:40.37	50.06	50.31
3	(Austria)	Thomas Stangassinger	1:40.44	50.01	50.43

=== Combination ===
Date: February 8

Placing	Country	Athlete	Points
1	(Norway)	Lasse Kjus	34,22
2	(Norway)	Kjetil André Aamodt	36,09
3	(Luxembourg)	Marc Girardelli	36,27

== Women's competitions ==
=== Downhill ===
Date: February 11

Placing	Country	Athlete	Time
1	(Canada)	Kate Pace	1:27.38
2	(Norway)	Astrid Lødemel	1:27.66
3	(Austria)	Anja Haas	1:27.84

=== Super G ===
Date: February 14

Placing	Country	Athlete	Time
1	(Germany)	Katja Seizinger	1:33.52
2	(Austria)	Sylvia Eder	1:33.68
3	(Norway)	Astrid Lødemel	1:34.07

=== Giant Slalom ===
Date: February 10

Placing	Country	Athlete	Time	Run 1	Run 2
1	(France)	Carole Merle	2:17.59	1:09.70	1:07.89
2	(Austria)	Anita Wachter	2:17.99	1:10.18	1:07.81
3	(Germany)	Martina Ertl	2:18.70	1:10.33	1:08.37

=== Slalom ===
Date: February 9

Placing	Country	Athlete	Time	Run 1	Run 2
1	(Austria)	Karin Buder	1:27.66	45.30	42.36
2	(United States)	Julie Parisien	1:27.87	44.64	43.23
3	(Austria)	Elfi Eder	1:28.65	44.96	43.69

=== Combination ===
Date: February 5

Placing	Country	Athlete	Points
1	(Germany)	Miriam Vogt	3,39
2	(United States)	Picabo Street	32,15
3	(Austria)	Anita Wachter	33,52

== Medals table ==
Place	Nation	Gold	Silver	Bronze	Total
1	Norway	3	3	1	7
2	Germany	2	-	1	3
3	Austria	1	3	4	8
4	France	1	-	-	1
	Canada	1	-	-	1
	Switzerland	1	-	-	1
7	United States	-	2	1	3
8	Luxembourg	-	1	1	2
9	Sweden	-	-	1	1
