= Pernilla Wiberg =

Swedish alpine skier

Pernilla Wiberg OLY
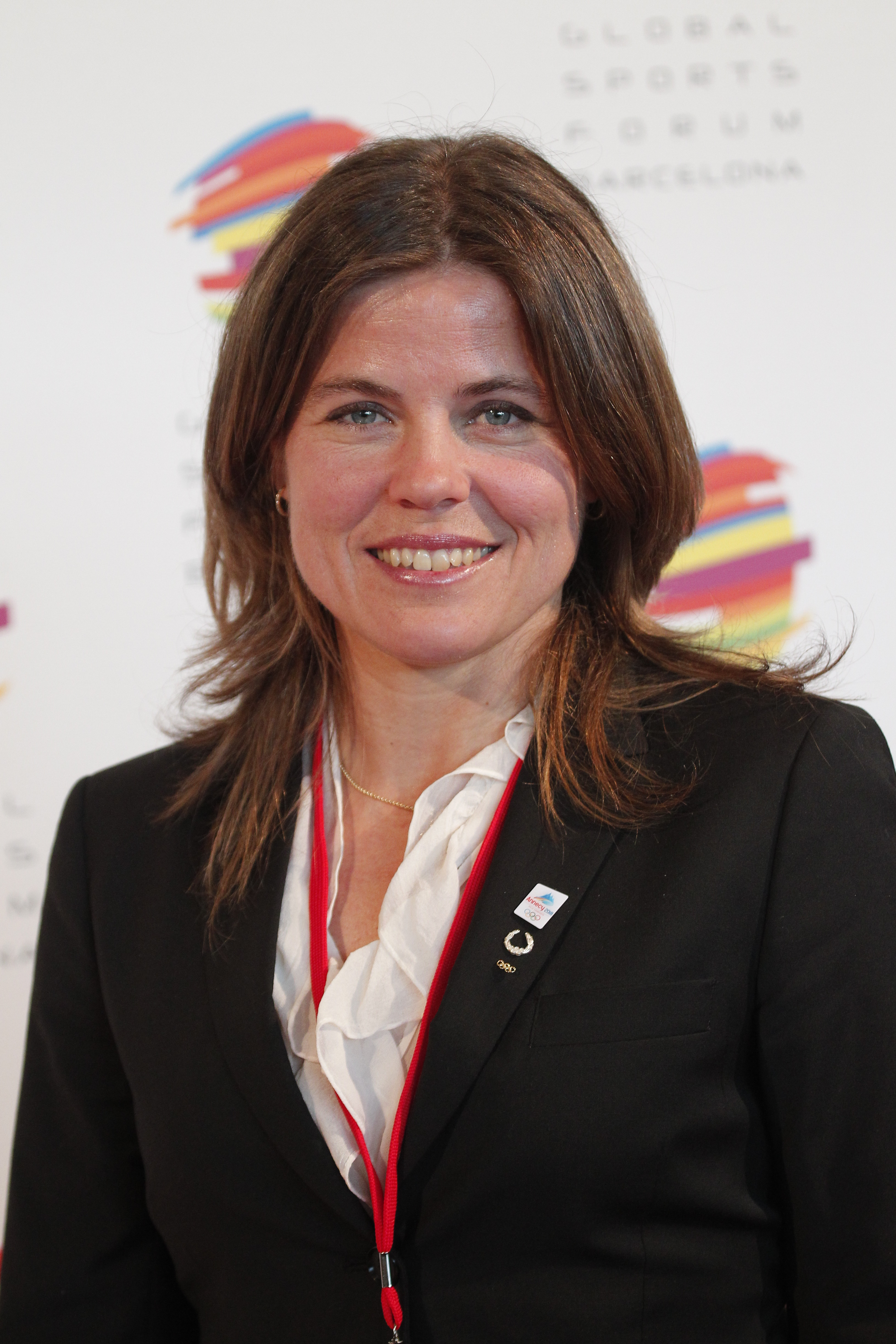
- Pernilla Wiberg in December 2011

Personal information
- Born: 15 October 1970 (age 55) Norrköping, Sweden
- Height: 1.61 m (5 ft 3 in)
- Website: pernilla-wiberg.com

Skiing career
- Sport: Alpine skiing
- Club: Norrköpings SK
- Retired: March 2002
- Disciplines: Downhill, super-G, giant slalom, slalom, combined
- World Cup debut: 13 March 1990 (age 19)

Olympics
- Teams: 4 – (1992 -2002)
- Medals: 3 (2 gold)

World Championships
- Teams: 5 – (1991 -2001)
- Medals: 6 (4 gold)

World Cup
- Seasons: 13 – (1990 -2002)
- Wins: 24
- Podiums: 61
- Overall titles: 1 – 1997
- Discipline titles: 4 – SL (1997), K (1994, 1995, 1997)
Medal record
Women's alpine skiing
Representing Sweden
World Cup race podiums
Event	1st	2nd	3rd
Slalom	14	14	7
Giant slalom	2	0	4
Downhill	2	5	1
Super-G	3	3	2
Combined	3	1	0
Total	24	23	14
International competitions
Event	1st	2nd	3rd
Olympic Games	2	1	0
World Championships	4	1	1
Total	6	2	1
Olympic Games
Gold medal – first place	1992 Albertville	Giant slalom
Gold medal – first place	1994 Lillehammer	Combined
Silver medal – second place	1998 Nagano	Downhill
World Championships
Gold medal – first place	1991 Saalbach	Giant slalom
Gold medal – first place	1996 Sierra Nevada	Slalom
Gold medal – first place	1996 Sierra Nevada	Combined
Gold medal – first place	1999 Vail	Combined
Silver medal – second place	1999 Vail	Slalom
Bronze medal – third place	1997 Sestrière	Downhill

Pernilla Wiberg (born 15 October 1970) is a Swedish former alpine ski racer and businesswoman. She competed on the World Cup circuit between 1990 and 2002, where she became one of the few all-event winners. Having won two Olympic gold medals, four World Championships and one World Cup overall title, she is one of the most successful alpine ski racers of the 1990s. On club level, she represented Norrköpings SK. She was born in Norrköping.

== Career ==
After competing without much success in two junior world championships in 1987 and 1988, Wiberg got her international breakthrough in the early 1990s. In her World Cup debut in Vemdalen, Sweden, on 13 March 1990, she finished 5th in slalom, and five days later she finished 3rd in giant slalom in Åre. In the following season of 1991, she claimed three World Cup victories and a giant slalom gold medal at the 1991 World Championships in Saalbach. Her Alpine World Championship gold was the first for a Scandinavian woman in 33 years. Until the end of her career in 2002, Wiberg won an additional 21 World Cup races, earning her a total of 24 World Cup race victories, including at least one victory in each of the five different alpine disciplines. In five World Championships she won six medals: four gold, one silver, and one bronze.

Her finest season was in 1996–1997 when she won ten World Cup races and took the overall, slalom, and combined titles. She dethroned the previous years World Cup Overall winner Katja Seizinger by over 500 points. In the slalom discipline she was incredibly dominant, winning 5 races, finish second twice, and once each third and fourth, in that season's 9 World Cup slalom races. She won her first ever World Cup downhill in the World Cup finale weekend, making her one of the first women ever to win World Cup races in all 5 disciplines. She also led the World Cup Super-G standings until the final race, and needed only a 5th-place finish in the Super-G on World Cup finale weekend (with Gerg's 2nd-place finish) to secure the season Super-G title. Unfortunately on pace for a 2nd or 3rd-place finish and to easily reach this, she went off course, losing the season Super-G crystal globe to Hilde Gerg. Wiberg considers the Super-G her second best event after the slalom and her favorite event to ski, but it is where she has had the most bad luck and disappointment through her 4th place in Lillehammer, mistakes at the 96 and 97 worlds, and highly unlucky loss of the Super-G season crystal globe in the 97 season.

Today, Wiberg comments alpine skiing for Sveriges Television.

== Olympics ==
Wiberg won the giant slalom gold in the 1992 Winter Olympics in Albertville and the combination gold medal in 1994 at Lillehammer. At both of these Olympics, Wiberg was the most successful Swedish athlete. In 1998 in Nagano, she won the downhill silver medal; Wiberg holds this achievement to be the best of her career. In her final Olympics in 2002 at age 31, she failed to reach the top ten and finished 14th in downhill and 12th in super-G. The Olympic super-G was to be her final international race, as she announced her retirement a few weeks later, following surgery on her knees.

== Awards ==
In 1991, Wiberg was awarded the Svenska Dagbladet Gold Medal. The jury's motivation was: "For the sensational giant slalom victory in the World Championships, secured through a bold and skillful second leg." The same year, 1991, she was awarded Jerring Award, an award she received again the following year.

== International Olympic Committee ==
Wiberg was elected a member of the International Olympic Committee in 2002 and served an eight-year mandate until 2010. She was a member of the following commissions: Athletes’ (2002–), Sport and Environment (2002), Ethics (2003–), Coordination for the XXI Olympic Winter Games in Vancouver in 2010 (2003–), Nominations (2003–). On 2 September 2008, IOC announced that Wiberg would chair a commission appointed by the president of IOC, Jacques Rogge. The commission would analyse the projects of the shortlisted cities candidating for 1st Winter Youth Olympic Games.

== Activism ==
Pernilla is today a member of the ‘Champions for Peace’ club, a group of 114 (as of 29 November 2018) famous elite athletes committed to serving peace in the world through sport, created by Peace and Sport, a Monaco-based international organization. Other Champions for Peace members include Ukrainian former pole vaulter, Sergey Bubka, British long-distance runner, Paula Radcliffe, and Serbian tennis player, Novak Djokovic.

== Personal life ==
Together with her husband Bødvar Bjerke, Wiberg has two children; Axel (b. 2003) and Sofia (b. 2007). Since 1995, she lives in Monaco.

As a businesswoman she owns and runs the Pernilla Wiberg Hotel at Idre Fjäll in Dalarna, Sweden.

== World Cup results ==
=== Season titles ===
5 titles (1 overall, 1 slalom, 3 combined)

Season	Discipline
1994	Combined
1995	Combined
1997	Overall
1997	Slalom
1997	Combined

=== Season standings ===
Season	Age	Overall	Slalom	Giant slalom	Super-G	Downhill	Combined
1990	19	45	17	—	—	—	—
1991	20	7	2	3	—	—	—
1992	21	5	2	5	28	—	—
1993	22	24	11	17	30	43	—
1994	23	2	2	11	5	11	1
1995	24	6	2	38	13	12	1
1996	25	8	3	34	19	10	—
1997	26	1	1	5	3	4	1
1998	27	35	24	28	36	29	11
1999	28	5	2	22	8	14	—
2000	29	33	28	41	21	22	—
2001	30	59	—	—	23	48	—
2002	31	23	—	57	13	10	12

=== Race victories ===
24 race victories (2 downhill, 3 Super-G, 2 giant slalom, 14 slalom, 3 combined)

Season	Date	Location	Race
1991	7 January 1991	Bad Kleinkirchheim, Austria	Slalom
1991	10 March 1991	Lake Louise, Canada	Giant slalom
1991	20 March 1991	Waterville Valley, U.S.	Slalom
1992	28 February 1992	Narvik, Norway	Giant slalom
1993	6 December 1992	Steamboat Springs, USA	Slalom
1994	12 December 1993	Veysonnaz, Switzerland	Slalom
1994	6 January 1994	Morzine, France	Slalom
1994	17 January 1994	Cortina d'Ampezzo, Italy	Super-G
1994	5 February 1994	Sierra Nevada, Spain	Combined
1995	12 March 1995	Lenzerheide, Switzerland	Slalom
1995	12 March 1995	Lenzerheide, Switzerland	Combined
1996	22 December 1995	Veysonnaz, Switzerland	Slalom
1996	29 December 1995	Semmering, Austria	Slalom
1997	1 December 1996	Lake Louise, Canada	Super-G
1997	28 December 1996	Semmering, Austria	Slalom
1997	4 January 1997	Maribor, Slovenia	Slalom
1997	12 January 1997	Bad Kleinkirchheim, Austria	Super-G
1997	19 January 1997	Zwiesel, Germany	Slalom
1997	2 February 1997	Laax, Switzerland	Combined
1997	7 March 1997	Mammoth Mountain, U.S.	Slalom
1997	12 March 1997	Vail, U.S.	Downhill
1997	16 March 1997	Vail, U.S.	Slalom
1999	3 January 1999	Maribor, Slovenia	Slalom
2000	18 December 1999	St. Moritz, Switzerland	Downhill

== Discography ==
=== Singles ===
Title	Year	Peak chart positions	Album
Title	Year	SWE	Album
"Privilege"	1992	39	Non-album singles

== See also ==
- List of FIS Alpine Ski World Cup women's race winners

Preceded by Stefan Edberg	Svenska Dagbladet Gold Medal; 1991	Succeeded by Jan-Ove Waldner
