= Alpine skiing at the 1994 Winter Olympics =

Alpine skiing at the XVII Olympic Winter Games
- Venue: Kvitfjell & Hafjell, Oppland, Norway
- Dates: 13–21 February 1994
- No. of events: 10
- Competitors: 250 from 45 nations

Location in Norway
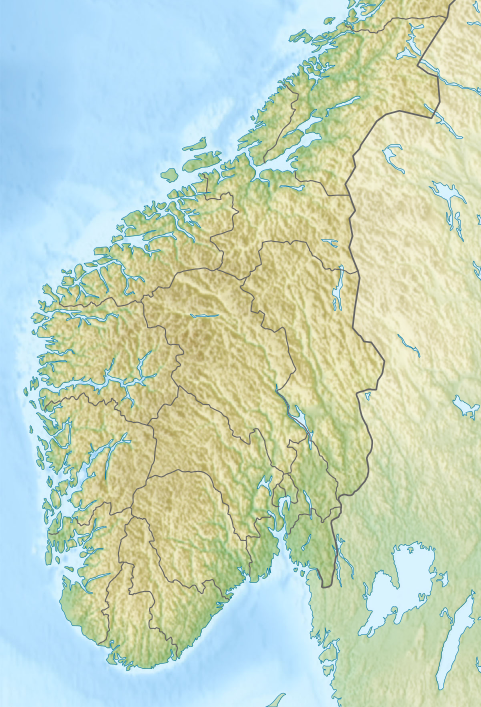
Locations in southern Norway

Alpine skiing at the 1994 Winter Olympics consisted of ten alpine skiing events, held north of the host city of Lillehammer, Norway. The speed events were held at Kvitfjell and the technical events at Hafjell from 13 to 21 February.

== Medal summary ==
Ten nations won medals in alpine skiing, with Germany leading the medal table with three golds and one silver. The host team of Norway won the most medals with five (1 gold, 2 silver, 2 bronze). Markus Wasmeier of Germany led the individual medal table with two gold medals (super G and giant slalom), while Vreni Schneider of Switzerland won the most medals with three, one of each type. Tommy Moe of the United States won gold in the downhill and silver in the super G. Kjetil André Aamodt of Norway won two silvers and a bronze.

Svetlana Gladishiva's silver medal was the first in alpine skiing won by Russia (Yevgeniya Sidorova won a bronze medal for the Soviet Union in 1956). Slovenia's three medals were the first for the country at the Winter Olympics.

=== Medal table ===
Rank	Nation	Gold	Silver	Bronze	Total
1	Germany	3	1	0	4
2	United States	2	2	0	4
3	Norway	1	2	2	5
4	Switzerland	1	2	1	4
5	Italy	1	1	2	4
6	Austria	1	1	1	3
7	Sweden	1	0	0	1
8	Russia	0	1	0	1
9	Slovenia	0	0	3	3
10	Canada	0	0	1	1
Totals (10 entries)		10	10	10	30

=== Men's events ===
Event	Gold		Silver		Bronze	
Downhill	Tommy Moe; United States	1:45.75	Kjetil André Aamodt; Norway	1:45.79	Ed Podivinsky; Canada	1:45.87
Super-G	Markus Wasmeier; Germany	1:32.53	Tommy Moe; United States	1:32.61	Kjetil André Aamodt; Norway	1:32.93
Giant slalom	Markus Wasmeier; Germany	2:52.46	Urs Kälin; Switzerland	2:52.48	Christian Mayer; Austria	2:52.58
Slalom	Thomas Stangassinger; Austria	2:02.02	Alberto Tomba; Italy	2:02.17	Jure Košir; Slovenia	2:02.53
Combined	Lasse Kjus; Norway	3:17.53	Kjetil André Aamodt; Norway	3:18.55	Harald Strand Nilsen; Norway	3:19.14

=== Women's events ===
Event	Gold		Silver		Bronze	
Downhill	Katja Seizinger; Germany	1:35.93	Picabo Street; United States	1:36.59	Isolde Kostner; Italy	1:36.85
Super-G	Diann Roffe; United States	1:22.15	Svetlana Gladishiva; Russia	1:22.44	Isolde Kostner; Italy	1:22.45
Giant slalom	Deborah Compagnoni; Italy	2:30.97	Martina Ertl; Germany	2:32.19	Vreni Schneider; Switzerland	2:32.97
Slalom	Vreni Schneider; Switzerland	1:56.01	Elfi Eder; Austria	1:56.35	Katja Koren; Slovenia	1:56.61
Combined	Pernilla Wiberg; Sweden	3:05.16	Vreni Schneider; Switzerland	3:05.29	Alenka Dovžan; Slovenia	3:06.64

== Course information ==
Date	Race	Start Elevation	Finish Elevation	Vertical Drop	Course Length	Average Gradient
Sun 13-Feb	Downhill – men	1,020 m (3,346 ft)	182 m (597 ft)	838 m (2,749 ft)	3.035 km (1.886 mi)	27.6%
Sat 19-Feb	Downhill – women	890 m (2,920 ft)	182 m (597 ft)	708 m (2,323 ft)	2.641 km (1.641 mi)	26.8%
Mon 14-Feb	Downhill - (K) – men	952 m (3,123 ft)	182 m (597 ft)	770 m (2,526 ft)	2.829 km (1.758 mi)	27.2%
Sun 20-Feb	Downhill - (K) – women	823 m (2,700 ft)	182 m (597 ft)	641 m (2,103 ft)	2.418 km (1.502 mi)	26.5%
Thu 17-Feb	Super-G – men	823 m (2,700 ft)	182 m (597 ft)	641 m (2,103 ft)	2.418 km (1.502 mi)	26.5%
Tue 15-Feb	Super-G – women	709 m (2,326 ft)	182 m (597 ft)	527 m (1,729 ft)	2.035 km (1.264 mi)	25.9%
Wed 23-Feb	Giant slalom – men	725 m (2,379 ft)	258 m (846 ft)	467 m (1,532 ft)	1.720 km (1.069 mi)	27.2%
Thu 24-Feb	Giant slalom – women	645 m (2,116 ft)	258 m (846 ft)	387 m (1,270 ft)	1.370 km (0.851 mi)	28.2%
Sun 27-Feb	Slalom – men	485 m (1,591 ft)	258 m (846 ft)	227 m (745 ft)	0.685 km (0.426 mi)	33.1%
Sat 26-Feb	Slalom – women	453 m (1,486 ft)	258 m (846 ft)	195 m (640 ft)	0.611 km (0.380 mi)	31.9%
Fri 25-Feb	Slalom – (K) – men	453 m (1,486 ft)	258 m (846 ft)	195 m (640 ft)		
Mon 21-Feb	Slalom – (K) – women	424 m (1,391 ft)	258 m (846 ft)	166 m (545 ft)		

== Participating nations ==
Forty-six nations sent alpine skiers to compete in the events in Lillehammer. Bosnia & Herzegovina, Georgia, Kazakhstan, Russia, Slovakia, and Ukraine made their Olympic alpine skiing debuts. Below is a list of the competing nations; in parentheses are the number of national competitors.

- Andorra (6)
- Argentina (9)
- Australia (2)
- Austria (20)
- Belgium (1)
- Bosnia and Herzegovina (2)
- Brazil (1)
- Bulgaria (2)
- Canada (11)
- Chile (3)
- Croatia (1)
- Cyprus (1)
- Denmark (1)
- Estonia (1)
- Finland (2)
- France (17)
- Georgia (2)
- Germany (14)
- Great Britain (6)
- Greece (1)
- Hungary (5)
- Iceland (3)
- Italy (20)
- Japan (5)
- Kazakhstan (2)
- South Korea (1)
- Liechtenstein (7)
- Luxembourg (1)
- Mexico (1)
- Monaco (1)
- New Zealand (3)
- Norway (12)
- Poland (1)
- Portugal (1)
- Romania (2)
- Russia (6)
- San Marino (1)
- Senegal (1)
- Slovakia (1)
- Slovenia (10)
- Spain (7)
- Sweden (11)
- Switzerland (21)
- Turkey (1)
- Ukraine (2)
- United States (22)

== See also ==
- Alpine skiing at the 1994 Winter Paralympics
