= 1990 Alpine Skiing World Cup – Women's overall =

1990 Women's overall World Cup
Previous: 1989	Next: 1991

Women's overall World Cup 1989/1990

In women's overall World Cup all results count.

Place	Name	Country	Total points	Downhill	Super-G	Giant	Slalom	Combined
1	Petra Kronberger	Austria	341	106	69	85	56	25
2	Anita Wachter	Austria	300	0	43	133	89	35
3	Michaela Gerg	West Germany	270	105	79	47	7	32
4	Maria Walliser	Switzerland	227	99	56	55	0	17
5	Carole Merle	France	202	50	99	53	0	0
6	Vreni Schneider	Switzerland	198	0	4	69	125	0
7	Mateja Svet	Yugoslavia	140	0	0	89	51	0
8	Michela Figini	Switzerland	134	105	24	5	0	0
9	Sigrid Wolf	Austria	133	33	73	27	0	0
10	Diann Roffe	United States	130	0	29	82	19	0
11	Karin Dedler	West Germany	125	62	36	21	0	6
12	Katrin Gutensohn	Austria	114	110	4	0	0	0
13	Claudia Strobl	Austria	108	0	0	0	108	0
14	Veronika Wallinger	Austria	102	69	33	0	0	0
15	Ida Ladstätter	Austria	98	0	0	0	98	0
	Karin Buder	Austria	94	0	0	0	94	0
17	Kristi Terzian	United States	93	0	18	32	32	11
18	Regine Mösenlechner	West Germany	85	9	52	24	0	0
19	Monika Maierhofer	Austria	83	0	0	12	71	0
20	Heidi Zeller	Switzerland	72	62	3	0	0	7
21	Veronika Šarec	Yugoslavia	68	0	0	12	56	0
	Kristina Andersson	Sweden	68	0	0	10	58	0
23	Heidi Zurbriggen	Switzerland	62	19	19	10	0	14
24	Christine von Grünigen	Switzerland	61	0	0	0	61	0
25	Patricia Chauvet	France	59	0	0	0	59	0
26	Miriam Vogt	West Germany	57	54	0	0	0	3
27	Zoe Haas	Switzerland	55	0	12	43	0	0
28	Cathy Chedal	France	54	2	45	7	0	0
	Sylvia Eder	Austria	54	4	12	29	0	9
30	Catherine Quittet	France	52	9	20	23	0	0
31	Ingrid Salvenmoser	Austria	50	0	0	21	29	0
32	Camilla Nilsson	Sweden	48	0	0	10	38	0
33	Barbara Sadleder	Austria	47	35	12	0	0	0
	Katjuša Pušnik	Yugoslavia	47	0	0	27	20	0
35	Ingrid Stöckl	Austria	42	17	0	0	4	21
36	Stefanie Schuster	Austria	41	24	2	0	5	10
37	Nathalie Bouvier	France	39	0	0	39	0	0
38	Nataša Bokal	Yugoslavia	38	0	0	0	38	0
39	Julie Lunde Hansen	Norway	37	0	0	37	0	0
40	Brigitte Oertli	Switzerland	35	5	0	0	5	25
41	Christina Meier	West Germany	34	6	0	28	0	0
42	Chantal Bournissen	Switzerland	33	7	0	0	3	23
43	Karen Percy	Canada	30	16	9	0	5	0
44	Katja Seizinger	West Germany	27	0	25	1	0	1
45	Pernilla Wiberg	Sweden	26	0	0	0	26	0
46	Hilary Lindh	United States	23	18	0	0	0	5
	Florence Masnada	France	23	0	0	15	8	0
48	Anette Gersch	West Germany	22	0	0	0	22	0
49	Kerrin Lee	Canada	21	21	0	0	0	0
	Sabine Ginther	Austria	21	5	6	10	0	0
51	Michelle McKendry	Canada	20	12	0	0	0	8
52	Deborah Compagnoni	Italy	19	0	9	10	0	0
	Traudl Hächer	West Germany	19	0	19	0	0	0
54	Edith Thys	United States	18	0	18	0	0	0
55	Gabriela Zingre	Switzerland	17	0	0	0	17	0
56	Anja Haas	Austria	14	0	0	0	0	14
	Kendra Kobelka	Canada	14	14	0	0	0	0
58	Varvara Zelenskaya	Soviet Union	12	12	0	0	0	0
59	Marianne Aam	Norway	11	0	0	8	0	3
60	Brigitte Auer	Austria	9	0	0	9	0	0
	Béatrice Filliol	France	9	0	0	0	9	0
62	Ulrike Stanggassinger	West Germany	8	5	3	0	0	0
	Brigitte Gadient	Switzerland	8	0	0	0	8	0
64	Eva Twardokens	United States	7	0	0	1	6	0
	Katrin Stotz	West Germany	7	0	0	0	7	0
	Andrea Salvenmoser	Austria	7	0	0	7	0	0
67	Olga Kurdachenko	Soviet Union	6	6	0	0	0	0
	Merete Fjeldavlie	Norway	6	0	0	6	0	0
	Heidi Voelker	United States	6	0	0	3	3	0
70	Monique Pelletier	United States	5	0	0	0	5	0
	Claudine Emonet	France	5	5	0	0	0	0
72	Marlis Spescha	Switzerland	4	4	0	0	0	0
	Gaby May	Switzerland	4	0	0	0	0	4
	Ylva Nowén	Sweden	4	0	0	4	0	0
75	Angelika Hurler	West Germany	3	0	0	3	0	0
76	Josée Lacasse	Canada	2	0	0	2	0	0
	Heidi Bowes	United States	2	0	0	0	2	0
	Cecilia Lucco	Italy	2	0	0	0	2	0
	Kristin Krone	United States	2	0	0	0	0	2
	Nancy Gee	Canada	2	0	2	0	0	0
81	Edith Antretter	West Germany	1	0	0	0	1	0
	Svetlana Gladysheva	Soviet Union	1	0	0	0	0	1
	Lucie Laroche	Canada	1	1	0	0	0	0

Alpine skiing World Cup
Women

Overall | Downhill | Super-G | Giant slalom | Slalom | Combined

1990
