= 1992 Alpine Skiing World Cup – Women's super-G =

1992 Women's super-G World Cup
Previous: 1991	Next: 1993

Women's super-G World Cup 1991/1992

== Final point standings ==
In women's super-G World Cup 1991/92 all results count.

Place	Name	Country	Total points	3 (Italy)	6 (Italy)	17 (France)	26 (United States)	28 (Canada)	29 (Switzerland)
1	Carole Merle	France	417	14	100	43	60	100	100
2	Merete Fjeldavlie	Norway	309	37	20	60	100	12	80
3	Katja Seizinger	Germany	234	100	40	-	-	51	43
4	Ulrike Maier	Austria	233	-	28	80	51	43	31
5	Sylvia Eder	Austria	227	-	37	24	55	60	51
6	Diann Roffe	United States	221	37	-	55	34	55	40
7	Kerrin Lee	Canada	218	51	-	31	51	80	5
8	Petra Kronberger	Austria	216	-	80	14	80	28	14
9	Heidi Zeller	Switzerland	197	55	51	51	31	-	9
10	Barbara Sadleder	Austria	178	80	22	-	43	9	24
11	Miriam Vogt	Germany	137	60	24	16	12	22	3
12	Regine Mösenlechner	Germany	131	37	47	47	-	-	-
13	Zoe Haas	Switzerland	127	-	5	5	37	20	60
	Heidi Zurbriggen	Switzerland	127	-	60	10	8	47	2
15	Deborah Compagnoni	Italy	126	-	26	100	-	-	-
16	Florence Masnada	France	123	43	43	8	7	-	22
17	Michaela Gerg	Germany	118	4	55	18	28	5	8
18	Regina Häusl	Germany	114	22	-	-	24	34	34
19	Traudl Hächer	Germany	112	-	5	26	-	34	47
20	Chantal Bournissen	Switzerland	96	28	-	12	-	40	16
21	Eva Twardokens	United States	90	22	-	7	6	-	55
22	Karin Dedler	Germany	86	14	34	28	10	-	-
23	Julie Parisien	United States	83	47	-	-	-	24	12
24	Veronika Wallinger	Austria	80	9	-	3	40	2	26
25	Ulrike Stanggassinger	Germany	75	-	31	7	-	37	-
26	Katrin Gutensohn	Germany	72	40	-	-	-	26	6
27	Anita Wachter	Austria	64	24	-	40	-	-	-
28	Pernilla Wiberg	Sweden	62	26	-	4	18	4	10
29	Barbara Merlin	Italy	57	-	-	9	4	16	28
30	Astrid Lødemel	Norway	53	-	-	1	14	18	20
31	Hilary Lindh	United States	48	-	-	20	22	6	-
32	Cathy Chedal	France	40	-	-	37	3	-	-
	Stefanie Schuster	Austria	40	-	-	-	-	3	37
34	Bibiana Perez	Italy	34	-	-	34	-	-	-
	Svetlana Gladysheva	Soviet Union	34	-	-	-	26	8	-
36	Anja Haas	Austria	32	-	10	22	-	-	-
	Michelle McKendry	Canada	32	16	-	-	16	-	-
38	Edith Thys	United States	29	-	7	-	22	-	-
39	Emi Kawabata	Japan	28	22	6	-	-	-	-
	Régine Cavagnoud	France	28	10	-	-	-	-	18
41	Karin Köllerer	Austria	23	7	14	-	2	-	-
42	Marlis Spescha	Switzerland	21	5	16	-	-	-	-
43	Manuela Heubi	Switzerland	18	-	18	-	-	-	-
44	Rosi Renoth	Germany	14	-	-	-	-	14	-
45	Varvara Zelenskaya	Soviet Union	12	-	12	-	-	-	-
	Alexandra Meissnitzer	Austria	12	3	9	-	-	-	-
	Kristin Krone	United States	12	2	8	2	-	-	-
48	Isabel Picenoni	Switzerland	11	-	-	-	-	10	1
49	Kathleen Monahan	United States	9	-	-	-	9	-	-
50	Wendy Fisher	United States	8	8	-	-	-	-	-
51	Kendra Kobelka	Canada	7	-	-	-	-	7	-
	Lucia Medzihradská	Czechoslovakia	7	-	-	-	-	-	7
53	Blanca Fernández Ochoa	Spain	6	6	-	-	-	-	-
	Carole Montillet	France	6	-	1	-	5	-	-
55	Sabine Ginther	Austria	4	1	3	-	-	-	-
	Michaela Dorfmeister	Austria	4	-	-	-	-	-	4
57	Christelle Felisaz	France	2	-	2	-	-	-	-
58	Romaine Fournier	Switzerland	1	-	-	-	-	1	-
	Tatyana Lebedeva	Soviet Union	1	-	-	-	1	-	-

Alpine skiing World Cup
Women

Overall | Downhill | Super-G | Giant slalom | Slalom | Combined

1992
