= 1992 Alpine Skiing World Cup – Women's downhill =

1992 Sports event

1992 Women's downhill World Cup
Previous: 1991	Next: 1993

Women's downhill World Cup 1991/1992

== Final point standings ==
In women's downhill World Cup 1991/92 all results count.

Place	Name	Country	Total points	5 (Italy)	7 (France)	9 (Austria)	16 (France)	19 (Switzerland)	25 (United States)	27 (Canada)
1	Katja Seizinger	Germany	523	80	43	100	100	40	100	60
2	Petra Kronberger	Austria	432	31	100	40	55	51	55	100
3	Miriam Vogt	Germany	359	43	60	47	47	80	60	22
4	Kerrin Lee	Canada	291	47	55	-	34	47	80	28
5	Heidi Zurbriggen	Switzerland	277	60	80	55	26	12	20	24
6	Chantal Bournissen	Switzerland	268	100	31	-	16	60	47	14
7	Sabine Ginther	Austria	248	40	-	80	28	100	-	-
8	Carole Merle	France	228	51	-	28	40	22	7	80
9	Michaela Gerg	Germany	216	37	-	24	60	22	18	55
10	Katharina Gutensohn	Germany	209	22	-	31	80	5	31	40
11	Svetlana Gladysheva	Soviet Union	203	16	16	60	34	37	24	16
12	Veronika Wallinger	Austria	202	6	51	34	43	16	43	9
13	Hilary Lindh	United States	179	24	26	10	20	31	31	37
	Varvara Zelenskaya	Soviet Union	179	55	37	37	9	28	3	10
15	Karin Dedler	Germany	174	34	47	51	24	14	4	-
16	Regina Häusl	Germany	161	20	7	26	-	55	6	47
17	Barbara Sadleder	Austria	147	-	34	-	22	6	51	34
18	Astrid Lødemel	Norway	136	-	8	-	14	43	40	31
19	Anja Haas	Austria	134	-	40	43	51	-	-	-
20	Heidi Zeller	Switzerland	116	18	-	-	37	-	10	51
21	Régine Cavagnoud	France	93	-	4	22	7	-	34	26
22	Krista Schmidinger	United States	90	-	24	-	2	24	37	3
23	Ulrike Stanggassinger	Germany	65	-	10	-	-	-	12	43
24	Marlis Spescha	Switzerland	62	28	20	14	-	-	-	-
25	Rosi Renoth	Germany	60	5	3	18	-	18	8	8
26	Tatyana Lebedeva	Soviet Union	51	-	-	-	14	3	22	12
27	Edith Thys	United States	47	1	28	-	18	-	-	-
	Michelle McKendry	Canada	47	8	12	-	-	-	26	1
29	Kristin Krone	United States	45	26	6	5	8	-	-	-
30	Gabriele Papp	Austria	43	12	-	-	5	8	16	2
31	Aline Triponez	Switzerland	37	-	-	-	-	37	-	-
32	Linn Remmem	Norway	36	-	22	-	-	-	14	-
33	Regine Mösenlechner	Germany	34	14	-	20	-	-	-	-
34	Emi Kawabata	Japan	33	-	-	7	-	26	-	-
35	Ingrid Stöckl	Austria	27	7	20	-	-	-	-	-
36	Christelle Felisaz	France	25	-	3	12	10	-	-	-
	Ulrike Maier	Austria	25	-	-	-	-	-	5	20
38	Stefanie Schuster	Austria	20	-	-	16	-	-	-	4
39	Larisa Majer	Soviet Union	18	4	-	2	3	9	-	-
	Barbara Merlin	Italy	18	-	-	-	-	-	-	18
41	Ľudmila Milanová	Czechoslovakia	16	-	16	-	-	-	-	-
	Merete Fjeldavlie	Norway	16	-	-	-	-	-	9	7
43	Romaine Fournier	Switzerland	15	-	-	5	4	-	1	5
44	Florence Masnada	France	13	4	-	8	1	-	-	-
	Megen Gerety	United States	14	4	-	-	-	10	-	-
	Monika Kogler	Germany	14	1	9	-	-	2	2	-
47	Michaela Dorfmeister	Austria	12	-	5	-	-	7	-	-
48	Kate Pace	Canada	10	10	-	-	-	-	-	-
49	Nancy Gee	Canada	9	9	-	-	-	-	-	-
	Carole Montillet	France	9	-	-	9	-	-	-	-
51	Isabel Picenoni	Switzerland	8	-	-	1	-	1	-	6
52	Lucia Medzihradská	Czechoslovakia	6	-	-	6	-	-	-	-
	Anita Wachter	Austria	6	-	-	-	6	-	-	-
54	Natalia Zamula	Soviet Union	5	-	-	5	-	-	-	-
55	Caterina Dietschi	Switzerland	4	-	-	-	-	4	-	-
56	Celine Dätwyler	Switzerland	3	-	3	-	-	-	-	-

Alpine skiing World Cup
Women

Overall | Downhill | Super-G | Giant slalom | Slalom | Combined

1992
