= 1991 Alpine Skiing World Cup – Women's super-G =

1991 Women's Super G World Cup
Previous: 1990	Next: 1992

Women's Super-G World Cup 1990/1991

== Calendar ==
Round	Race No	Place	Country	Date	Winner	Second	Third
1	4	Altenmarkt	Austria	December 9, 1990	(Austria) Petra Kronberger	(Austria) Sigrid Wolf	(Austria) Anita Wachter
2	5	Meiringen	Switzerland	December 16, 1990	(Switzerland) Chantal Bournissen	(Austria) Petra Kronberger	(Canada) Lucie Laroche
3	16	Méribel	France	January 19, 1991	(Austria) Petra Kronberger	(Germany) Michaela Gerg	(France) Carole Merle
4	18	Garmisch-Partenkirchen	Germany	February 9, 1991	(France) Carole Merle	(Germany) Karin Dedler	(Germany) Michaela Gerg
5	21	Furano	Japan	February 24, 1991	(France) Carole Merle	(United States) Edith Thys	(Austria) Sabine Ginther

== Final point standings ==
In Women's Super-G World Cup 1990/91 all results count.

Place	Name	Country	Total points	4 (Austria)	5 (Switzerland)	16 (France)	18 (Germany)	21 (Japan)
1	Carole Merle	France	88	12	11	15	25	25
2	Petra Kronberger	Austria	70	25	20	25	-	-
3	Michaela Gerg	Germany	44	2	-	20	15	7
4	Karin Dedler	Germany	33	10	-	3	20	-
	Katja Seizinger	Germany	33	-	-	12	11	10
6	Sigrid Wolf	Austria	30	20	10	-	-	-
	Chantal Bournissen	Switzerland	30	1	25	-	4	-
8	Sabine Ginther	Austria	28	-	3	-	10	15
9	Sylvia Eder	Austria	26	6	12	-	-	8
10	Lucie Laroche	Canada	24	-	15	-	-	9
11	Nathalie Bouvier	France	23	4	-	7	12	-
	Anita Wachter	Austria	23	15	-	-	8	-
13	Edith Thys	United States	21	-	1	-	-	20
14	Traudl Hächer	Germany	20	-	-	-	9	11
15	Zoe Haas	Switzerland	19	8	-	11	-	-
16	Kerrin Lee	Canada	18	9	-	1	6	2
17	Katrin Gutensohn	Germany	15	-	9	6	-	-
	Heidi Zurbriggen	Switzerland	15	-	-	10	5	-
19	Barbara Sadleder	Austria	13	5	-	8	-	-
20	Miriam Vogt	Germany	12	-	-	-	-	12
21	Diann Roffe	United States	11	11	-	-	-	-
22	Veronika Wallinger	Austria	10	-	5	-	-	5
	Regine Mösenlechner	Germany	10	-	-	-	7	3
24	Kate Pace	Canada	9	-	9	-	-	-
	Ulrike Stanggassinger	Germany	9	-	-	9	-	-
26	Ulrike Maier	Austria	8	-	-	4	4	-
27	Hilary Lindh	United States	7	7	-	-	-	-
	Marie-Pierre Gatel	France	7	-	7	-	-	-
29	Kristin Krone	United States	6	-	6	-	-	-
	Michelle McKendry	Canada	6	-	-	-	-	6
31	Ulla Lodzinya	Soviet Union	5	-	5	-	-	-
	Merete Fjeldavlie	Norway	5	-	-	5	-	-
33	Romaine Fournier	Switzerland	4	-	-	-	-	4
34	Stefanie Schuster	Austria	3	3	-	-	-	-
35	Eva Twardokens	United States	2	-	2	-	-	-
	Karin Köllerer	Austria	2	-	-	2	-	-
	Svetlana Gladysheva	Soviet Union	2	-	-	-	2	-
38	Varvara Zelenskaya	Soviet Union	1	-	-	-	1	-
	Emi Kawabata	Japan	1	-	-	-	-	1

== Women's Super-G Team Results ==
bold indicate highest score - italics indicate race wins

Place	Country	Total points	4 (Austria)	5 (Switzerland)	16 (France)	18 (Germany)	21 (Japan)	Racers	Wins
1	Austria	213	**74**	50	39	22	28	10	2
2	Germany	176	12	9	50	62	43	8	0
3	France	118	16	18	22	37	25	3	2
4	Switzerland	68	9	25	21	9	4	4	1
5	Canada	57	9	24	1	6	17	4	0
6	United States	47	18	9	-	-	20	5	0
7	Soviet Union	8	-	5	-	3	-	3	0
8	Norway	5	-	-	5	-	-	1	0
9	Japan	1	-	-	-	-	1	1	0

**Alpine skiing World Cup**
**Women**

Overall | Downhill | Super-G | Giant Slalom | Slalom | Combined

**1991**
