= 1992 Alpine Skiing World Cup – Women's giant slalom =

1992 Women's giant slalom World Cup
Previous: 1991	Next: 1993

Women's giant slalom World Cup 1991/1992

== Final point standings ==
In women's giant slalom World Cup 1991/92 all results count.

Place	Name	Country	Total points	4 (Italy)	8 (Germany)	13 (Austria)	15 (Italy)	18 (France)	22 (Norway)	30 (Switzerland)
1	Carole Merle	France	566	51	60	100	100	100	55	100
2	Vreni Schneider	Switzerland	391	100	100	60	80	51	-	-
3	Diann Roffe	United States	372	60	40	55	55	60	51	51
4	Deborah Compagnoni	Italy	344	80	80	80	24	80	-	-
5	Pernilla Wiberg	Sweden	314	40	43	51	-	40	100	40
6	Ulrike Maier	Austria	256	43	24	47	40	47	-	55
7	Eva Twardokens	United States	251	26	51	37	60	55	-	22
8	Blanca Fernández Ochoa	Spain	238	3	55	18	18	4	60	80
9	Anita Wachter	Austria	225	37	37	14	26	31	80	-
10	Katja Seizinger	Germany	180	18	31	40	20	10	43	18
11	Sylvia Eder	Austria	169	-	22	26	16	34	47	24
12	Petra Kronberger	Austria	165	-	28	31	37	-	26	43
	Ingrid Salvenmoser	Austria	165	28	47	20	-	5	37	28
14	Traudl Hächer	Germany	147	-	26	-	43	24	34	20
15	Christina Meier	Germany	146	51	-	28	-	8	28	31
16	Julie Parisien	United States	127	-	9	24	47	-	-	47
17	Christelle Guignard	France	126	-	-	34	9	43	40	-
18	Heidi Zurbriggen	Switzerland	120	12	34	22	22	-	14	16
19	Michaela Gerg	Germany	115	4	20	43	8	12	22	6
20	Kristina Andersson	Sweden	109	9	-	-	51	6	31	12
21	Barbara Merlin	Italy	108	55	14	8	-	22	-	9
22	Corinne Rey-Bellet	Switzerland	98	-	-	12	-	26	-	60
23	Martina Ertl	Germany	96	34	18	-	34	-	-	10
24	Lara Magoni	Italy	76	-	12	-	31	9	24	-
25	Sabine Ginther	Austria	70	14	16	-	12	28	-	-
26	Brigitte Auer	Austria	69	16	-	16	-	37	-	-
27	Ylva Nowén	Sweden	64	22	-	-	28	14	-	-
28	Anne Berge	Norway	47	-	2	4	-	7	-	34
29	Kerrin Lee	Canada	44	10	-	9	5	20	-	-
30	Zoe Haas	Switzerland	40	24	-	-	-	16	-	-
31	Astrid Lødemel	Norway	37	-	-	-	-	-	-	37
32	Petra Bernet	Switzerland	33	-	10	5	-	2	16	-
33	Merete Fjeldavlie	Norway	31	31	-	-	-	-	-	-
34	Angelika Hurler	Germany	28	-	-	-	-	-	-	28
35	Katjuša Pušnik	Slovenia	21	7	-	-	14	-	-	-
	Miriam Vogt	Germany	21	-	6	7	-	-	-	8
37	Morena Gallizio	Italy	20	20	-	-	-	-	-	-
	Gabriela Zingre	Switzerland	20	-	-	-	-	-	20	-
39	Špela Pretnar	Slovenia	18	-	-	-	-	18	-	-
	Florence Masnada	France	18	-	-	-	-	-	18	-
	Nataša Bokal	Slovenia	18	-	-	-	4	-	-	14
42	Christine von Grünigen	Switzerland	14	-	8	6	-	-	-	-
	Barbara Brlec	Slovenia	14	-	4	-	-	-	10	-
44	Katrin Neuenschwander	Switzerland	13	-	-	10	-	-	-	3
45	Gaby May	Switzerland	12	-	-	-	-	-	12	-
46	Kristi Terzian	United States	10	-	-	-	10	-	-	-
47	Veronika Šarec	Slovenia	9	-	-	2	-	-	-	7
48	Bibiana Perez	Italy	8	8	-	-	-	-	-	-
	Alexandra Meissnitzer	Austria	8	-	-	1	7	-	-	-
50	Monika Maierhofer	Austria	7	-	7	-	-	-	-	-
51	Patricia Chauvet	France	6	6	-	-	-	-	-	-
	Roberta Serra	Italy	6	-	-	-	6	-	-	-
	Wendy Fisher	United States	6	-	3	-	-	3	-	-
54	Varvara Zelenskaya	Soviet Union	5	5	-	-	-	-	-	-
	Claudia Strobl	Austria	5	-	5	-	-	-	-	-
	Marcella Biondi	Italy	5	-	-	-	-	-	-	5
57	Leïla Piccard	France	4	-	-	-	-	-	-	4
58	Karin Köllerer	Austria	3	-	-	3	-	-	-	-
	Karin Dedler	Germany	3	-	-	-	3	-	-	-

Alpine skiing World Cup
Women

Overall | Downhill | Super-G | Giant slalom | Slalom | Combined

1992
