= 1991 Alpine Skiing World Cup – Women's downhill =

1991 Women's downhill World Cup
| Previous: 1990 | Next: 1992 |

Women's downhill World Cup 1990/1991

== Calendar ==
| Round | Race No | Place | Country | Date | Winner | Second | Third |
|---|---|---|---|---|---|---|---|
| 1 | 3 | Altenmarkt | Austria | December 8, 1990 | (Germany) Katrin Gutensohn | (Austria) Petra Kronberger | (Canada) Kerrin Lee |
| 2 | 6 | Morzine | France | December 21, 1990 | (Austria) Petra Kronberger | (Switzerland) Chantal Bournissen | (Soviet Union) Varvara Zelenskaya |
| 3 | 9 | Bad Kleinkirchheim | Austria | January 6, 1991 | (Germany) Katrin Gutensohn | (Austria) Sabine Ginther | (Switzerland) Chantal Bournissen |
| 4 | 15 | Méribel | France | January 18, 1991 | (Austria) Petra Kronberger | (France) Carole Merle | (Austria) Veronika Wallinger |
| 5 | 17 | Garmisch-Partenkirchen | Germany | February 8, 1991 | (Switzerland) Chantal Bournissen | (France) Carole Merle | (Austria) Veronika Wallinger |
| 6 | 20 | Furano | Japan | February 24, 1991 | (Austria) Anja Haas | (Switzerland) Chantal Bournissen | (Soviet Union) Varvara Zelenskaya |
| 7 | 22 | Lake Louise | Canada | March 9, 1991 | (Austria) Sabine Ginther | (Switzerland) Chantal Bournissen | (Soviet Union) Svetlana Gladysheva |
| 8 | 25 | Vail | United States | March 15, 1991 | (Austria) Sabine Ginther | (Canada) Lucie Laroche | (Switzerland) Chantal Bournissen |
| 9 | 26 | Vail | United States | March 16, 1991 | (Switzerland) Chantal Bournissen | (Austria) Anja Haas | (Austria) Sabine Ginther |

== Final point standings ==
In women's downhill World Cup 1990/91 all results count.

| Place | Name | Country | Total points | 3 (Austria) | 6 (France) | 9 (Austria) | 15 (France) | 17 (Germany) | 20 (Japan) | 22 (Canada) | 25 (United States) | 26 (United States) |
|---|---|---|---|---|---|---|---|---|---|---|---|---|
| 1 | Chantal Bournissen | Switzerland | 140 | - | 20 | 15 | - | 25 | 20 | 20 | 15 | 25 |
| 2 | Sabine Ginther | Austria | 122 | 11 | 8 | 20 | - | 8 | 10 | 25 | 25 | 15 |
| 3 | Petra Kronberger | Austria | 90 | 20 | 25 | 3 | 25 | - | 9 | 8 | - | - |
| 4 | Carole Merle | France | 76 | 10 | 11 | 9 | 20 | 20 | 3 | 3 | - | - |
| 5 | Veronika Wallinger | Austria | 74 | 7 | 5 | 7 | 15 | 15 | 2 | 5 | 7 | 11 |
| 6 | Katrin Gutensohn | Germany | 72 | 25 | 10 | 25 | 12 | - | - | - | - | - |
| 7 | Anja Haas | Austria | 70 | 6 | - | 1 | 2 | 9 | 25 | 7 | - | 20 |
| 8 | Varvara Zelenskaya | Soviet Union | 68 | - | 15 | 11 | - | 10 | 15 | 12 | 5 | - |
| 9 | Kerrin Lee | Canada | 60 | 15 | - | 12 | 1 | 11 | 6 | 11 | 1 | 3 |
| 10 | Lucie Laroche | Canada | 49 | - | - | - | - | 5 | 7 | 9 | 20 | 8 |
| 11 | Svetlana Gladysheva | Soviet Union | 46 | 2 | 1 | - | 3 | - | 8 | 15 | 7 | 10 |
| 12 | Miriam Vogt | Germany | 38 | - | 9 | 5 | 6 | 3 | 5 | 2 | 8 | - |
| 13 | Katja Seizinger | Germany | 34 | - | 12 | 7 | - | 4 | 11 | - | - | - |
| 14 | Karin Dedler | Germany | 32 | 12 | 6 | 4 | - | - | - | 10 | - | - |
| 15 | Nathalie Bouvier | France | 28 | - | 7 | 8 | 7 | 6 | - | - | - | - |
| 16 | Barbara Sadleder | Austria | 24 | 8 | - | - | - | 12 | - | 4 | - | - |
| 17 | Michaela Gerg | Germany | 23 | - | 3 | 10 | 10 | - | - | - | - | - |
| 18 | Heidi Zurbriggen | Switzerland | 20 | 9 | - | - | - | 1 | 1 | - | 9 | - |
| 19 | Régine Cavagnoud | France | 19 | - | - | - | - | - | - | - | 10 | 9 |
| 20 | Kristin Krone | United States | 16 | - | - | - | - | - | - | - | 12 | 4 |
| 21 | Edith Thys | United States | 15 | - | - | - | - | - | - | - | 3 | 12 |
| 22 | Ingrid Stöckl | Austria | 14 | 3 | - | - | 11 | - | - | - | - | - |
| 23 | Kate Pace | Canada | 12 | - | - | - | - | - | 12 | - | - | - |
| 24 | Megan Gerety | United States | 11 | - | - | - | - | - | - | - | 11 | - |
| 25 | Lucia Medzihradská | Czechoslovakia | 10 | - | - | 1 | 9 | - | - | - | - | - |
| | Heidi Zeller | Switzerland | 10 | - | - | - | 5 | - | 4 | 1 | - | - |
| | Hilary Lindh | United States | 10 | - | - | - | - | - | - | - | 4 | 6 |
| 28 | Stefanie Schuster | Austria | 8 | 4 | 4 | - | - | - | - | - | - | - |
| | Marlis Spescha | Switzerland | 8 | - | - | - | 8 | - | - | - | - | - |
| 30 | Monika Kogler | Austria | 7 | - | - | 2 | - | - | - | - | - | 5 |
| | Tatyana Lebedeva | Soviet Union | 7 | - | - | - | - | 7 | - | - | - | - |
| | Krista Schmidinger | United States | 7 | - | - | - | - | - | - | - | - | 7 |
| | Michelle McKendry | Canada | 7 | - | - | - | - | - | - | 6 | - | 1 |
| 34 | Sigrid Wolf | Austria | 5 | 5 | - | - | - | - | - | - | - | - |
| 35 | Romaine Fournier | Switzerland | 4 | - | - | - | 4 | - | - | - | - | - |
| 36 | Christina Meier | Germany | 3 | 1 | 2 | - | - | - | - | - | - | - |
| 37 | Andreja Potisk-Ribič | Yugoslavia | 2 | - | - | - | - | 2 | - | - | - | - |
| | Regine Mösenlechner | Germany | 2 | - | - | - | - | - | - | - | 2 | - |
| | Cathy Chedal | France | 2 | - | - | - | - | - | - | - | - | 2 |

== Women's Downhill Team Results ==
bold indicate highest score - italics indicate race wins

| Place | Country | Total points | 3 (Austria) | 6 (France) | 9 (Austria) | 15 (France) | 17 (Germany) | 20 (Japan) | 22 (Canada) | 25 (United States) | 26 (United States) | Racers | Wins |
|---|---|---|---|---|---|---|---|---|---|---|---|---|---|
| 1 | Austria | 414 | **64** | 42 | 33 | 53 | 44 | 46 | 49 | 32 | 51 | 9 | 5 |
| 2 | Germany | 204 | 38 | 42 | 51 | 28 | 7 | 16 | 12 | 10 | - | 7 | 2 |
| 3 | Switzerland | 182 | 9 | 20 | 15 | 17 | 26 | 25 | 21 | 24 | 25 | 5 | 2 |
| 4 | Canada | 128 | 15 | - | 12 | 1 | 16 | 25 | 26 | 21 | 12 | 4 | 0 |
| 5 | France | 125 | 10 | 18 | 17 | 27 | 26 | 3 | 3 | 10 | 11 | 4 | 0 |
| 6 | Soviet Union | 121 | 2 | 16 | 11 | 3 | 17 | 23 | 27 | 12 | 10 | 3 | 0 |
| 7 | United States | 59 | - | - | - | - | - | - | - | 30 | 29 | 5 | 0 |
| 8 | Czechoslovakia | 10 | - | - | 1 | 9 | - | - | - | - | - | 1 | 0 |
| 9 | Yugoslavia | 2 | - | - | - | - | 2 | - | - | - | - | 1 | 0 |

**Alpine skiing World Cup**
**Women**

Overall | Downhill | Super-G | Giant slalom | Slalom | Combined

**1991**
