= 1990 Alpine Skiing World Cup – Women's downhill =

1990 Women's downhill World Cup
Previous: 1989	Next: 1991

Women's downhill World Cup 1989/1990

== Calendar ==
Round	Race No	Place	Country	Date	Winner	Second	Third
1	1	Las Leñas	Argentina	August 8, 1989	(West Germany) Michaela Gerg	(Switzerland) Heidi Zeller	(Austria) Veronika Wallinger
2	7	Steamboat Springs	United States	December 9, 1989	(Switzerland) Maria Walliser	(Switzerland) Michela Figini	(West Germany) Michaela Gerg
3	10	Panorama	Canada	December 16, 1989	(Austria) Petra Kronberger	(West Germany) Michaela Gerg	(Canada) Karen Percy
4	11	Panorama	Canada	December 17, 1989	(Austria) Petra Kronberger	(West Germany) Katrin Gutensohn	(West Germany) Michaela Gerg
5	15	Haus im Ennstal	Austria	January 13, 1990	(Switzerland) Maria Walliser	(Austria) Petra Kronberger	(West Germany) Karin Dedler
6	20	Santa Caterina	Italy	January 27, 1990	(Switzerland) Michela Figini	(West Germany) Miriam Vogt	(Austria) Petra Kronberger
7	23	Veysonnaz	Switzerland	February 3, 1990	(West Germany) Katrin Gutensohn	(France) Carole Merle	(Switzerland) Michela Figini
8	24	Veysonnaz	Switzerland	February 4, 1990	(West Germany) Katrin Gutensohn	(France) Carole Merle	(West Germany) Karin Dedler

== Final point standings ==
In women's downhill World Cup 1989/90 all results count.

Place	Name	Country	Total points	1 (Argentina)	7 (United States)	10 (Canada)	11 (Canada)	15 (Austria)	20 (Italy)	23 (Switzerland)	24 (Switzerland)
1	Katrin Gutensohn	West Germany	110	-	11	12	20	10	7	25	25
2	Petra Kronberger	Austria	106	7	3	25	25	20	15	3	8
3	Michaela Gerg	West Germany	105	25	15	20	15	6	12	2	10
	Michela Figini	Switzerland	105	12	20	10	9	7	25	15	7
5	Maria Walliser	Switzerland	99	11	25	-	9	25	11	9	9
6	Veronika Wallinger	Austria	69	15	12	11	5	12	2	-	12
7	Heidi Zeller	Switzerland	62	20	8	5	12	-	10	7	-
	Karin Dedler	West Germany	62	6	5	7	6	15	-	8	15
9	Miriam Vogt	West Germany	54	-	10	2	2	9	20	11	-
10	Carole Merle	France	50	10	-	-	-	-	-	20	20
11	Barbara Sadleder	Austria	35	8	-	9	11	2	-	-	5
12	Sigrid Wolf	Austria	33	-	-	7	-	11	-	12	3
13	Stefanie Schuster	Austria	24	4	-	-	-	3	9	6	2
14	Kerrin Lee	Canada	21	-	-	-	-	-	-	10	11
15	Heidi Zurbriggen	Switzerland	19	-	9	-	-	-	5	4	1
16	Hilary Lindh	United States	18	-	8	-	10	-	-	-	-
17	Ingrid Stöckl	Austria	17	-	-	-	-	8	-	5	4
18	Karen Percy	Canada	16	-	1	15	-	-	-	-	-
19	Kendra Kobelka	Canada	14	-	-	-	-	-	8	-	6
20	Michelle McKendry	Canada	12	-	-	8	4	-	-	-	-
	Varvara Zelenskaya	Soviet Union	12	-	6	-	1	5	-	-	-
22	Regine Mösenlechner	West Germany	9	9	-	-	-	-	-	-	-
	Catherine Quittet	France	9	-	4	4	-	1	-	-	-
24	Chantal Bournissen	Switzerland	7	-	-	-	7	-	-	-	-
25	Christina Meier	West Germany	6	-	2	-	4	-	-	-	-
	Olga Kurdachenko	Soviet Union	6	-	-	-	-	-	6	-	-
27	Sabine Ginther	Austria	5	5	-	-	-	-	-	-	-
	Ulrike Stanggassinger	West Germany	5	-	-	1	-	4	-	-	-
	Claudine Emonet	France	5	4	-	-	-	-	1	-	-
	Brigitte Oertli	Switzerland	5	-	-	-	-	-	4	1	-
31	Marlis Spescha	Switzerland	4	-	-	3	1	-	-	-	-
	Sylvia Eder	Austria	4	-	1	-	-	-	3	-	-
33	Cathy Chedal	France	2	2	-	-	-	-	-	-	-
34	Lucie Laroche	Canada	1	1	-	-	-	-	-	-	-

Alpine skiing World Cup
Women

Overall | Downhill | Super-G | Giant slalom | Slalom | Combined

1990
