= 1990 Alpine Skiing World Cup – Women's super-G =

1990 Women's super-G World Cup
Previous: 1989	Next: 1991

Women's super-G World Cup 1989/1990

== Calendar ==
Round	Race No	Place	Country	Date	Winner	Second	Third
1	2	Las Leñas	Argentina	August 9, 1989	(Austria) Anita Wachter	(France) Cathy Chedal	(Austria) Petra Kronberger
2	5	Vail	United States	December 2, 1989	(West Germany) Regine Mösenlechner	(Austria) Sigrid Wolf	(West Germany) Michaela Gerg
3	21	Santa Caterina	Italy	January 27, 1990	(Austria) Sigrid Wolf	(France) Carole Merle	(Austria) Petra Kronberger
4	26	Méribel	France	February 10, 1990	(France) Carole Merle	(Switzerland) Maria Walliser	(West Germany) Michaela Gerg
5	27	Méribel	France	February 11, 1990	(France) Carole Merle	(West Germany) Katja Seizinger	(Switzerland) Maria Walliser
6	32	Åre	Sweden	March 16, 1990	(France) Carole Merle	(West Germany) Michaela Gerg	(Austria) Petra Kronberger

== Final point standings ==
In women's super-G World Cup 1989/90 all results count.

Place	Name	Country	Total points	2 (Argentina)	5 (United States)	21 (Italy)	26 (France)	27 (France)	32 (Sweden)
1	Carole Merle	France	99	4	-	20	25	25	25
2	Michaela Gerg	West Germany	79	6	15	12	15	11	20
3	Sigrid Wolf	Austria	73	-	20	25	11	6	11
4	Petra Kronberger	Austria	69	15	7	15	5	12	15
5	Maria Walliser	Switzerland	56	-	12	-	20	15	9
6	Regine Mösenlechner	West Germany	52	12	25	4	1	-	10
7	Cathy Chedal	France	45	20	-	5	6	2	12
8	Anita Wachter	Austria	43	25	-	-	12	-	6
9	Karin Dedler	West Germany	36	8	10	9	9	-	-
10	Veronika Wallinger	Austria	33	5	-	10	8	10	-
11	Diann Roffe	United States	29	-	5	6	-	10	8
12	Katja Seizinger	West Germany	25	-	-	-	5	20	-
13	Michela Figini	Switzerland	24	10	-	11	-	3	-
14	Catherine Quittet	France	20	12	8	-	-	-	-
15	Heidi Zurbriggen	Switzerland	19	2	6	-	3	8	-
	Traudl Hächer	West Germany	19	-	-	1	2	8	8
17	Edith Thys	United States	18	7	11	-	-	-	-
18	Kristi Terzian	United States	18	1	4	-	10	1	2
19	Zoe Haas	Switzerland	12	-	4	-	8	-	-
20	Sylvia Eder	Austria	12	-	-	7	-	-	5
	Barbara Sadleder	Austria	12	-	-	8	-	-	4
22	Deborah Compagnoni	Italy	9	9	-	-	-	-	-
	Karen Percy	Canada	9	-	9	-	-	-	-
24	Sabine Ginther	Austria	6	-	-	-	-	5	1
25	Vreni Schneider	Switzerland	4	3	1	-	-	-	-
	Katrin Gutensohn	Germany	4	-	-	-	-	4	-
27	Ulrike Stanggassinger	West Germany	3	-	-	3	-	-	-
	Heidi Zeller	Switzerland	3	-	-	-	-	-	3
29	Stefanie Schuster	Austria	2	-	2	-	-	-	-
	Nancy Gee	Canada	2	-	-	2	-	-	-

Alpine skiing World Cup
Women

Overall | Downhill | Super-G | Giant slalom | Slalom | Combined

1990
