= 1990 Alpine Skiing World Cup – Women's giant slalom =

1990 Women's giant slalom World Cup
Previous: 1989	Next: 1991

Women's giant slalom World Cup 1989/1990

== Calendar ==
Round	Race No	Place	Country	Date	Winner	Second	Third
1	3	Park City	United States	November 24, 1989	(France) Nathalie Bouvier	(United States) Diann Roffe	(Austria) Anita Wachter
2	6	Vail	United States	December 3, 1989	(Austria) Anita Wachter	(United States) Diann Roffe	(Switzerland) Vreni Schneider
3	13	Hinterstoder	Austria	January 8, 1990	(Austria) Petra Kronberger	(Austria) Anita Wachter	(West Germany) Michaela Gerg
4	18	Maribor	Yugoslavia	January 20, 1990	(Socialist Federal Republic of Yugoslavia) Mateja Svet	(Austria) Anita Wachter	(Switzerland) Maria Walliser
5	22	Santa Caterina	Italy	January 28, 1990	(Austria) Petra Kronberger	(Austria) Anita Wachter	(Switzerland) Zoe Haas
6	25	Veysonnaz	Switzerland	February 5, 1990	(Socialist Federal Republic of Yugoslavia) Mateja Svet	(Austria) Anita Wachter	(United States) Diann Roffe
7	28	Stranda	Norway	March 10, 1990	(France) Carole Merle	(United States) Kristi Terzian	(France) Florence Masnada
8	31	Klövsjö	Sweden	March 14, 1990	(France) Carole Merle	(Norway) Julie Lunde Hansen	(Socialist Federal Republic of Yugoslavia) Mateja Svet

== Final point standings ==
In women's giant slalom World Cup 1989/90 all results count.

Place	Name	Country	Total points	3 (United States)	6 (United States)	13 (Austria)	18 (Socialist Federal Republic of Yugoslavia)	22 (Italy)	25 (Switzerland)	28 (Norway)	31 (Sweden)
1	Anita Wachter	Austria	133	15	25	20	20	20	20	4	9
2	Mateja Svet	Yugoslavia	89	-	1	3	25	8	25	12	15
3	Petra Kronberger	Austria	85	4	-	25	12	25	2	10	7
4	Diann Roffe	United States	82	20	20	10	9	-	15	-	8
5	Vreni Schneider	Switzerland	69	-	15	11	11	11	9	-	12
6	Maria Walliser	Switzerland	55	3	-	6	15	12	10	3	6
7	Carole Merle	France	53	-	-	-	-	3	-	25	25
8	Michaela Gerg	West Germany	47	10	7	15	-	9	6	-	-
9	Zoe Haas	Switzerland	43	11	-	-	-	15	12	5	-
10	Nathalie Bouvier	France	39	25	8	-	-	-	-	6	-
11	Julie Lunde Hansen	Norway	37	-	-	-	6	-	-	11	20
12	Kristi Terzian	United States	32	6	-	-	-	1	5	20	-
13	Sylvia Eder	Austria	29	-	7	12	-	-	-	9	1
14	Christina Meier	West Germany	28	9	11	8	-	-	-	-	-
15	Katjuša Pušnik	Yugoslavia	27	12	-	-	4	-	-	-	11
16	Sigrid Wolf	Austria	27	-	12	5	5	2	-	-	3
17	Regine Mösenlechner	West Germany	24	7	9	7	-	-	-	1	-
18	Catherine Quittet	France	23	8	5	-	10	-	-	-	-
19	Karin Dedler	West Germany	21	5	4	1	3	8	-	-	-
	Ingrid Salvenmoser	Austria	21	-	3	4	7	-	7	-	-
21	Florence Masnada	France	15	-	-	-	-	-	-	15	-
22	Veronika Šarec	Yugoslavia	12	-	-	-	-	-	12	-	-
	Monika Maierhofer	Austria	12	-	-	-	-	4	8	-	-
24	Heidi Zurbriggen	Switzerland	10	-	10	-	-	-	-	-	-
	Deborah Compagnoni	Italy	10	-	-	-	-	10	-	-	-
	Sabine Ginther	Austria	10	-	-	-	-	6	4	-	-
	Camilla Nilsson	Sweden	10	-	-	-	-	-	-	-	10
	Kristina Andersson	Sweden	10	-	-	-	-	-	-	8	2
29	Brigitte Auer	Austria	9	-	-	9	-	-	-	-	-
30	Marianne Aam	Norway	8	-	-	-	8	-	-	-	-
31	Cathy Chedal	France	7	-	-	-	-	-	-	7	-
	Andrea Salvenmoser	Austria	7	-	-	-	-	-	-	2	5
33	Merete Fjeldavlie	Norway	6	-	-	-	-	6	-	-	-
34	Michela Figini	Switzerland	5	-	3	2	-	-	-	-	-
35	Ylva Nowén	Sweden	4	-	-	-	-	-	-	-	4
36	Heidi Voelker	United States	3	-	-	-	-	-	3	-	-
	Angelika Hurler	West Germany	3	-	-	-	2	-	1	-	-
38	Josée Lacasse	Canada	2	2	-	-	-	-	-	-	-
39	Eva Twardokens	United States	1	1	-	-	-	-	-	-	-
	Katja Seizinger	West Germany	1	-	-	-	1	-	-	-	-

Alpine skiing World Cup
Women

Overall | Downhill | Super-G | Giant Slalom | Slalom | Combined

1990
