= 1992 Alpine Skiing World Cup – Women's slalom =

1992 Women's slalom World Cup
Previous: 1991	Next: 1993

Women's slalom World Cup 1991/1992

== Final point standings ==
In women's slalom World Cup 1991/92 all results count. Vreni Schneider won her third Slalom World Cup.

Place	Name	Country	Total points	1 (Austria)	2 (Austria)	10 (Austria)	12 (Austria)	14 (Slovenia)	20 (Switzerland)	23 (Norway)	24 (Sweden)
1	Vreni Schneider	Switzerland	511	100	80	-	80	100	-	100	51
2	Pernilla Wiberg	Sweden	445	-	55	43	47	60	80	80	80
3	Blanca Fernández Ochoa	Spain	413	60	100	80	34	37	-	55	47
4	Petra Kronberger	Austria	369	80	60	-	55	31	40	60	43
5	Annelise Coberger	New Zealand	335	-	26	60	100	55	60	-	34
6	Karin Buder	Austria	319	40	43	37	37	51	51	-	60
7	Monika Maierhofer	Austria	312	37	34	55	-	28	100	40	18
8	Julie Parisien	United States	262	51	-	51	60	-	-	-	100
9	Nataša Bokal	Slovenia	251	-	24	28	43	34	31	51	40
10	Claudia Strobl	Austria	244	55	51	-	-	-	55	43	40
11	Sabine Ginther	Austria	224	-	47	100	-	40	37	-	-
12	Elfi Eder	Austria	192	34	-	47	40	43	-	-	28
13	Kristina Andersson	Sweden	190	43	-	-	20	26	20	47	34
14	Christine von Grünigen	Switzerland	184	-	37	-	51	24	34	26	12
15	Anita Wachter	Austria	163	-	31	14	-	20	43	-	55
16	Katrin Neuenschwander	Switzerland	146	31	12	-	24	9	22	24	24
17	Lara Magoni	Italy	130	18	-	40	18	-	16	34	4
18	Eva Twardokens	United States	124	14	-	22	28	22	26	12	-
19	Deborah Compagnoni	Italy	120	-	40	-	-	80	-	-	-
20	Veronika Šarec	Slovenia	116	-	-	-	14	14	31	31	26
21	Urška Hrovat	Slovenia	114	-	-	-	12	47	47	-	8
22	Gabriela Zingre	Switzerland	112	28	10	8	-	-	9	37	20
23	Annik Bonzon	Switzerland	110	24	22	24	-	18	12	-	10
24	Ingrid Salvenmoser	Austria	91	16	9	-	31	-	14	7	14
25	Anne Berge	Norway	68	-	-	-	-	-	18	28	22
	Gaby May	Switzerland	68	26	-	7	-	12	-	16	7
27	Florence Masnada	France	56	47	-	-	9	-	-	-	-
	Edda Mutter	Germany	56	6	16	16	-	-	-	18	-
29	Brigitte Auer	Austria	54	-	-	-	-	16	-	22	16
30	Ylva Nowén	Sweden	51	7	20	-	-	-	24	-	-
	Heidi Voelker	United States	51	-	28	-	10	5	-	8	-
32	Katjuša Pušnik	Slovenia	49	10	8	-	26	-	-	3	2
33	Ulrike Maier	Austria	47	-	-	-	-	8	10	20	9
34	Bibiana Perez	Italy	34	-	-	34	-	-	-	-	-
	Renate Oberhofer	Italy	34	-	-	18	16	-	-	-	-
36	Roberta Serra	Italy	31	-	-	31	-	-	-	-	-
	Astrid Plank	Italy	31	-	-	-	22	-	7	2	-
38	Morena Gallizio	Italy	30	8	14	-	-	-	8	-	-
39	Christina Rodling	Sweden	27	9	-	-	8	10	-	-	-
40	Wendy Fisher	United States	26	-	-	26	-	-	-	-	-
	Anja Haas	Austria	26	-	-	20	6	-	-	-	-
42	Patricia Chauvet	France	24	12	-	-	-	-	-	6	6
43	Anna Bodén	Sweden	22	22	-	-	-	-	-	-	-
	Martina Accola	Switzerland	22	-	-	10	-	-	-	9	3
45	Christelle Guignard	France	20	20	-	-	-	-	-	-	-
46	Ingrid Stöckl	Austria	18	-	18	-	-	-	-	-	-
47	Anouk Barnier	France	17	-	-	-	5	-	-	12	-
48	Diann Roffe	United States	14	-	-	-	7	7	-	-	-
	Kerstin Riediger	Germany	14	-	-	-	-	-	-	14	-
50	Monique Pelletier	United States	13	-	-	9	-	-	-	4	-
51	Monika Kälin	Switzerland	12	-	-	12	-	-	-	-	-
52	Nives Sitar	Slovenia	6	-	-	-	-	6	-	-	-
53	Marianne Kjørstad	Norway	5	-	-	-	-	-	-	5	-
	Karin Köllerer	Austria	5	-	-	-	-	-	-	-	5

Alpine skiing World Cup
Women

Overall | Downhill | Super-G | Giant | Slalom | Combined

1992
