= 1991 Alpine Skiing World Cup – Women's combined =

1991 Women's combined World Cup
Previous: 1990	Next: 1992

Women's combined World Cup 1990/1991

== Calendar ==
Round	Race No	Discipline	Place	Country	Date	Winner	Second	Third
1	8	Downhill slalom	Morzine	France	December 21, 1990; December 22, 1990	(Austria) Ingrid Stöckl	(France) Florence Masnada	(Austria) Sabine Ginther
2	11	Downhill slalom	Bad Kleinkirchheim	Austria	January 6, 1991; January 7, 1991	(Austria) Petra Kronberger	(Austria) Sabine Ginther	(France) Florence Masnada

== Final point standings ==
In women's combined World Cup 1990/91 both results count.

Place	Name	Country	Total points	8 (France)	11 (Austria)
1	Sabine Ginther	Austria	35	15	20
	Florence Masnada	France	35	20	15
3	Ingrid Stöckl	Austria	34	25	9
4	Petra Kronberger	Austria	25	-	25
5	Michaela Gerg	Germany	21	9	12
6	Stefanie Schuster	Austria	20	10	10
7	Lucia Medzihradská	Czechoslovakia	18	7	11
8	Anja Haas	Austria	16	8	8
9	Anita Wachter	Austria	12	12	-
10	Chantal Bournissen	Switzerland	11	11	-
11	Miriam Vogt	Germany	10	6	4
12	Katja Seizinger	Germany	7	-	7
13	Heidi Zurbriggen	Switzerland	6	-	6
14	Kate Pace	Canada	5	5	-
	Karin Dedler	Germany	5	-	5
16	Christelle Guignard	France	4	4	-
17	Karin Köllerer	Austria	3	3	-
	Veronika Tarasovičová	Czechoslovakia	3	-	3
19	Eva Twardokens	United States	2	2	-
20	Régine Cavagnoud	France	1	1	-

Note:

In race 2 not all points were awarded (not enough finishers).

== Women's Combined Team Results ==
bold indicate highest score - italics indicate race wins

Place	Country	Total points	8 (France)	11 (Austria)	Racers	Wins
1	Austria	145	**73**	72	7	2
2	Germany	43	15	28	4	0
3	France	40	25	15	3	0
4	Czechoslovakia	21	7	14	2	0
5	Switzerland	17	11	6	2	0
6	Canada	5	5	-	1	0
7	United States	2	2	-	1	0

**Alpine skiing World Cup**
**Women**

Overall | Downhill | Super-G | Giant slalom | Slalom | Combined

**1991**
