= 1990 Alpine Skiing World Cup – Women's slalom =

1990 Women's slalom World Cup
Previous: 1989	Next: 1991

Women's slalom World Cup 1989/1990

== Calendar ==
Round	Race No	Place	Country	Date	Winner	Second	Third
1	4	Park City	United States	November 25, 1989	(Switzerland) Vreni Schneider	(Austria) Monika Maierhofer	(Austria) Anita Wachter
2	8	Steamboat Springs	United States	December 10, 1989	(Austria) Claudia Strobl	(Socialist Federal Republic of Yugoslavia) Veronika Šarec	(Austria) Karin Buder
3	12	Piancavallo	Italy	January 6, 1990	(Switzerland) Vreni Schneider	(Austria) Monika Maierhofer	(Austria) Claudia Strobl
4	14	Hinterstoder	Austria	January 9, 1990	(Switzerland) Vreni Schneider	(Austria) Anita Wachter	(Switzerland) Christine von Grünigen
5	16	Haus im Ennstal	Austria	January 14, 1990	(Socialist Federal Republic of Yugoslavia) Veronika Šarec	(Austria) Monika Maierhofer	(Austria) Claudia Strobl
6	19	Maribor	Yugoslavia	January 21, 1990	(Switzerland) Vreni Schneider	(Austria) Ida Ladstätter	(France) Patricia Chauvet
7	29	Stranda	Norway	March 11, 1990	(Austria) Karin Buder	(Austria) Claudia Strobl	(Austria) Anita Wachter
8	30	Vemdalen	Sweden	March 13, 1990	(Austria) Petra Kronberger	(Austria) Ida Ladstätter	(Austria) Claudia Strobl
9	33	Åre	Sweden	March 18, 1990	(Switzerland) Vreni Schneider	(France) Patricia Chauvet	(Sweden) Pernilla Wiberg

== Final point standings ==
In women's slalom World Cup 1989/90 all results count.

Place	Name	Country	Total points	4 (United States)	8 (United States)	12 (Italy)	14 (Austria)	16 (Austria)	19 (Socialist Federal Republic of Yugoslavia)	29 (Norway)	30 (Sweden)	33 (Sweden)
1	Vreni Schneider	Switzerland	125	25	-	25	25	-	25	-	-	25
2	Claudia Strobl	Austria	108	7	25	15	11	15	-	20	15	-
3	Ida Ladstätter	Austria	98	6	12	6	-	12	20	11	20	11
4	Karin Buder	Austria	94	11	15	4	12	3	-	25	12	12
5	Anita Wachter	Austria	89	15	8	12	20	5	8	15	6	-
6	Monika Maierhofer	Austria	71	20	-	20	-	20	11	-	-	-
7	Christine von Grünigen	Switzerland	61	-	-	10	15	9	9	8	-	10
8	Patricia Chauvet	France	59	-	7	-	-	10	15	-	7	20
9	Kristina Andersson	Sweden	58	8	11	7	6	8	10	-	-	8
10	Veronika Šarec	Yugoslavia	56	-	20	11	-	25	-	-	-	-
	Petra Kronberger	Austria	56	12	-	2	8	-	-	9	25	-
12	Mateja Svet	Yugoslavia	51	-	10	8	-	11	12	-	10	-
13	Camilla Nilsson	Sweden	38	10	7	-	-	-	-	12	2	7
14	Nataša Bokal	Yugoslavia	38	-	-	-	10	7	6	4	8	3
15	Kristi Terzian	United States	32	9	4	1	7	-	4	5	-	2
16	Ingrid Salvenmoser	Austria	29	-	-	-	-	6	3	10	9	1
17	Pernilla Wiberg	Sweden	26	-	-	-	-	-	-	-	11	15
18	Anette Gersch	West Germany	22	3	9	9	-	-	1	-	-	-
19	Katjuša Pušnik	Yugoslavia	20	-	-	-	-	5	7	2	-	6
20	Diann Roffe	United States	19	-	2	-	-	2	-	3	3	9
21	Gabriela Zingre	Switzerland	17	5	-	-	4	-	-	1	1	6
22	Béatrice Filliol	France	9	-	-	-	9	-	-	-	-	-
23	Brigitte Gadient	Switzerland	8	-	-	-	3	-	-	-	5	-
	Florence Masnada	France	8	-	-	-	-	-	-	-	4	4
25	Michaela Gerg	West Germany	7	-	-	-	-	-	-	7	-	-
	Katrin Stotz	West Germany	7	-	-	-	-	-	-	7	-	-
27	Eva Twardokens	United States	6	-	3	3	-	-	-	-	-	-
28	Brigitte Oertli	Switzerland	5	-	5	-	-	-	-	-	-	-
	Karen Percy	Canada	5	-	-	5	-	-	-	-	-	-
	Stefanie Schuster	Austria	5	-	-	-	5	-	-	-	-	-
	Monique Pelletier	United States	5	-	-	-	-	-	5	-	-	-
32	Ingrid Stöckl	Austria	4	4	-	-	-	-	-	-	-	-
33	Chantal Bournissen	Switzerland	3	-	-	-	2	1	-	-	-	-
	Heidi Voelker	United States	3	-	1	-	-	-	2	-	-	-
35	Heidi Bowes	United States	2	2	-	-	-	-	-	-	-	-
	Cecilia Lucco	Italy	2	2	-	-	-	-	-	-	-	-
37	Edith Antretter	West Germany	1	-	-	-	1	-	-	-	-	-

Alpine skiing World Cup
Women

Overall | Downhill | Super-G | Giant slalom | Slalom | Combined

1990
