= 1991 Alpine Skiing World Cup – Women's slalom =

1991 Women's slalom World Cup
Previous: 1990	Next: 1992

Women's slalom World Cup 1990/1991

== Calendar ==
Round	Race No	Place	Country	Date	Winner	Second	Third
1	2	Val Zoldana	Italy	December 2, 1990	(Austria) Petra Kronberger	(Austria) Ingrid Salvenmoser	(France) Patricia Chauvet
2	7	Morzine	France	December 22, 1990	(Spain) Blanca Fernández Ochoa	(Sweden) Pernilla Wiberg	(Switzerland) Vreni Schneider
3	10	Bad Kleinkirchheim	Austria	January 7, 1991	(Sweden) Pernilla Wiberg	(Austria) Monika Maierhofer	(Switzerland) Christine von Grünigen
4	13	Kranjska Gora	Yugoslavia	January 12, 1991	(Socialist Federal Republic of Yugoslavia) Nataša Bokal	(Austria) Monika Maierhofer	(Socialist Federal Republic of Yugoslavia) Veronika Šarec
5	14	Kranjska Gora	Yugoslavia	January 13, 1991	(Austria) Petra Kronberger	(Austria) Ingrid Salvenmoser	(Socialist Federal Republic of Yugoslavia) Veronika Šarec
6	24	Lake Louise	Canada	March 11, 1991	(Switzerland) Vreni Schneider	(Sweden) Kristina Andersson	(Austria) Anita Wachter
7	28	Waterville Valley	United States	March 20, 1991	(Sweden) Pernilla Wiberg	(Switzerland) Vreni Schneider	(Austria) Petra Kronberger

== Final point standings ==
In women's slalom World Cup 1990/91 all results count.

Place	Name	Country	Total points	2 (Italy)	7 (France)	10 (Austria)	13 (Socialist Federal Republic of Yugoslavia)	14 (Socialist Federal Republic of Yugoslavia)	24 (Canada)	28 (United States)
1	Petra Kronberger	Austria	83	25	-	12	6	25	-	15
2	Pernilla Wiberg	Sweden	79	-	20	25	-	9	-	25
3	Blanca Fernández Ochoa	Spain	76	9	25	1	11	11	10	9
4	Ingrid Salvenmoser	Austria	75	20	-	11	4	20	8	12
5	Vreni Schneider	Switzerland	72	-	15	-	12	-	25	20
6	Christine von Grünigen	Switzerland	61	-	10	15	7	12	9	8
7	Veronika Šarec	Yugoslavia	60	4	7	8	15	15	-	11
8	Monika Maierhofer	Austria	59	12	-	20	20	-	-	7
9	Patricia Chauvet	France	50	15	-	8	2	10	12	3
10	Kristina Andersson	Sweden	37	-	8	-	2	7	20	-
	Karin Buder	Austria	37	11	11	-	-	9	-	6
12	Claudia Strobl	Austria	35	6	1	10	8	-	-	10
13	Florence Masnada	France	31	-	12	10	9	-	-	-
14	Nataša Bokal	Yugoslavia	28	-	-	3	25	-	-	-
	Anita Wachter	Austria	28	-	9	-	4	-	15	-
	Katjuša Pušnik	Yugoslavia	28	-	-	-	5	6	12	5
17	Eva Twardokens	United States	22	8	5	4	-	4	-	1
18	Anne Berge	Norway	14	-	6	6	-	-	2	-
19	Heidi Voelker	United States	12	-	2	5	-	-	5	-
20	Christelle Guignard	France	11	-	4	-	-	-	7	-
21	Diann Roffe	United States	10	10	-	-	-	-	-	-
	Anouk Barnier	France	10	-	-	-	10	-	-	-
	Anette Gersch	Germany	10	7	-	-	-	-	3	-
24	Angela Drexl	Germany	7	5	-	-	-	-	-	2
25	Karin Köllerer	Austria	6	-	-	-	-	-	6	-
26	Gaby May	Switzerland	5	-	-	-	-	5	-	-
27	Elfi Eder	Austria	4	2	-	2	-	-	-	-
	Renate Oberhofer	Italy	4	-	-	-	-	-	4	-
	Sabine Ginther	Austria	4	-	-	-	-	-	-	4
30	Giovanna Gianera	Italy	3	3	-	-	-	-	-	-
	Ingrid Stöckl	Austria	3	-	3	-	-	-	-	-
	Béatrice Filliol	France	3	-	-	-	-	3	-	-
33	Gabriela Zingre	Switzerland	2	-	-	-	-	2	-	-
34	Lara Magoni	Italy	1	1	-	-	-	-	-	-
	Tanis Hunt	United States	1	-	-	-	-	1	-	-
	Julie Parisien	United States	1	-	-	-	-	-	1	-

== Women's slalom team results ==
bold indicate highest score - italics indicate race wins

Place	Country	Total points	2 (Italy)	7 (France)	10 (Austria)	13 (Socialist Federal Republic of Yugoslavia)	14 (Socialist Federal Republic of Yugoslavia)	24 (Canada)	28 (United States)	Racers	Wins
1	Austria	334	**76**	24	55	42	54	29	54	10	2
2	Switzerland	140	-	25	15	19	19	34	28	4	1
3	Yugoslavia	116	4	7	11	45	21	12	16	3	1
4	Sweden	116	-	28	25	2	16	20	25	2	2
5	France	105	15	16	18	21	13	19	3	5	0
6	Spain	76	9	25	1	11	11	10	9	1	1
7	United States	46	18	7	9	-	5	6	1	5	0
8	Germany	17	12	-	-	-	-	3	2	2	0
9	Norway	14	-	6	6	-	-	2	-	1	0
10	Italy	8	4	-	-	-	-	4	-	3	0

**Alpine skiing World Cup**
**Women**

Overall | Downhill | Super-G | Giant slalom | **Slalom** | Combined

**1991**
