= 1991 Alpine Skiing World Cup – Women's giant slalom =

1991 Women's giant slalom World Cup
Previous: 1990	Next: 1992

Women's giant slalom World Cup 1990/1991

== Calendar ==
Round	Race No	Place	Country	Date	Winner	Second	Third
1	1	Val Zoldana	Italy	December 1, 1990	(Austria) Petra Kronberger	(Switzerland) Vreni Schneider	(Sweden) Pernilla Wiberg
2	12	Kranjska Gora	Yugoslavia	January 11, 1991	(Switzerland) Vreni Schneider	(Socialist Federal Republic of Yugoslavia) Nataša Bokal	(Austria) Petra Kronberger
3	19	Zwiesel	Germany	February 10, 1991	(Austria) Anita Wachter	(United States) Eva Twardokens	(Switzerland) Vreni Schneider
4	23	Lake Louise	Canada	March 10, 1991	(Sweden) Pernilla Wiberg	(Switzerland) Vreni Schneider	(Austria) Sylvia Eder
5	27	Vail	United States	March 17, 1991	(Switzerland) Vreni Schneider	(Norway) Julie Lunde Hansen	(Austria) Anita Wachter
6	29	Waterville Valley	United States	March 22, 1991	(United States) Julie Parisien	(Austria) Ulrike Maier	(Norway) Julie Lunde Hansen

== Final point standings ==
In women's giant slalom World Cup 1990/91 all results count.

Place	Name	Country	Total points	1 (Italy)	12 (Socialist Federal Republic of Yugoslavia)	19 (Germany)	23 (Canada)	27 (United States)	29 (United States)
1	Vreni Schneider	Switzerland	113	20	25	15	20	25	8
2	Anita Wachter	Austria	79	11	8	25	11	15	9
3	Pernilla Wiberg	Sweden	61	15	-	-	25	10	11
4	Eva Twardokens	United States	57	-	12	20	8	7	10
5	Julie Lunde Hansen	Norway	50	9	-	6	-	20	15
	Sylvia Eder	Austria	50	-	11	12	15	-	12
7	Petra Kronberger	Austria	44	25	15	-	-	-	4
8	Nataša Bokal	Yugoslavia	43	-	20	10	9	4	-
9	Ulrike Maier	Austria	42	-	7	-	6	9	20
10	Julie Parisien	United States	36	-	-	-	-	11	25
11	Ingrid Salvenmoser	Austria	28	4	9	7	-	8	-
12	Kristina Andersson	Sweden	26	-	-	9	7	5	6
13	Angelika Hurler	Germany	24	12	-	-	12	-	-
	Zoe Haas	Switzerland	24	-	5	2	10	-	7
15	Katjuša Pušnik	Yugoslavia	14	2	-	11	1	-	-
16	Petra Bernet	Switzerland	13	-	6	-	4	-	3
17	Carole Merle	France	12	-	4	8	-	-	-
	Deborah Compagnoni	Italy	12	-	-	-	-	12	-
	Blanca Fernández Ochoa	Spain	12	6	-	-	-	6	-
20	Sigird Wolf	Austria	10	10	-	-	-	-	-
	Monika Maierhofer	Austria	10	-	10	-	-	-	-
22	Ylva Nowén	Sweden	9	7	-	-	2	-	-
	Traudl Hächer	Germany	9	3	-	-	-	-	6
24	Diann Roffe	United States	8	8	-	-	-	-	-
	Christina Meier	Germany	8	6	2	-	-	-	-
26	Claudia Strobl	Austria	7	-	-	4	-	3	-
27	Michaela Gerg	Germany	6	-	1	3	-	2	-
	Sabine Ginther	Austria	6	1	-	-	3	-	2
29	Katja Seizinger	Germany	5	-	-	5	-	-	-
	Karin Köllerer	Austria	5	-	-	-	5	-	-
31	Brigitte Auer	Austria	3	-	3	-	-	-	-
32	Nathalie Bouvier	France	1	-	-	1	-	-	-
	Edith Thys	United States	1	-	-	-	-	1	-
	Veronika Šarec	Yugoslavia	1	-	-	-	-	-	1

== Women's giant slalom team results ==
bold indicate highest score - italics indicate race wins

Place	Country	Total points	1 (Italy)	12 (Socialist Federal Republic of Yugoslavia)	19 (Germany)	23 (Canada)	27 (United States)	29 (United States)	Racers	Wins
1	Austria	284	51	**63**	48	40	35	47	11	2
2	Switzerland	150	20	36	17	34	25	18	3	2
3	United States	102	8	12	20	8	19	35	4	1
4	Sweden	96	22	-	9	34	15	16	3	1
5	Yugoslavia	58	2	20	21	10	4	1	3	0
6	Germany	52	21	3	8	12	2	6	5	0
7	Norway	50	9	-	6	-	20	15	1	0
8	France	13	-	4	9	-	-	-	2	0
9	Italy	12	-	-	-	-	12	-	1	0
	Spain	12	6	-	-	-	6	-	1	0

**Alpine skiing World Cup**
**Women**

Overall | Downhill | Super-G | Giant slalom | Slalom | Combined

**1991**
