= 1990 Alpine Skiing World Cup – Women's combined =

1990 Women's combined World Cup
Previous: 1989	Next: 1991

Women's combined World Cup 1989/1990

== Calendar ==
Round	Race No	Discipline	Place	Country	Date	Winner	Second	Third
1	9	Downhill slalom	Steamboat Springs	United States	December 9, 1989; December 10, 1989	(Switzerland) Brigitte Oertli	(West Germany) Michaela Gerg	(Austria) Anita Wachter
2	17	Downhill slalom	Haus im Ennstal	Austria	January 13, 1990; January 14, 1990	(Austria) Petra Kronberger	(Austria) Anita Wachter	(Austria) Ingrid Stöckl

== Final point standings ==
In women's combined World Cup 1989/90 both results count.

Place	Name	Country	Total points	9 (United States)	17 (Austria)
1	Anita Wachter	Austria	35	15	20
2	Michaela Gerg	West Germany	32	20	12
3	Brigitte Oertli	Switzerland	25	25	-
	Petra Kronberger	Austria	25	-	25
5	Chantal Bournissen	Switzerland	23	12	11
6	Ingrid Stöckl	Austria	21	6	15
7	Maria Walliser	Switzerland	17	8	9
8	Heidi Zurbriggen	Switzerland	14	4	10
	Anja Haas	Austria	14	7	7
10	Kristi Terzian	United States	11	11	-
11	Stefanie Schuster	Austria	10	10	-
12	Sylvia Eder	Austria	9	9	-
13	Michelle McKendry	Canada	8	-	8
14	Heidi Zeller	Switzerland	7	2	5
15	Karin Dedler	West Germany	6	-	6
16	Hilary Lindh	United States	5	5	-
17	Gaby May	Switzerland	4	-	4
18	Miriam Vogt	West Germany	3	3	-
	Marianne Aam	Norway	3	-	3
20	Kristin Krone	United States	2	-	2
21	Katja Seizinger	West Germany	1	1	-
	Svetlana Gladysheva	Soviet Union	1	-	1

Alpine skiing World Cup
Women

Overall | Downhill | Super-G | Giant slalom | Slalom | Combined

1990
