= Alpine skiing at the 1998 Winter Olympics – Women's super-G =

Women's super-G at the XVIII Olympic Winter Games
- Alpine skiing
- Venue: Hakuba
- Date: February 11, 1998
- Competitors: 43 from 19 nations
- Winning time: 1:18.02

Medalists
1st place, gold medalist(s)		Picabo Street	United States
2nd place, silver medalist(s)		Michaela Dorfmeister	Austria
3rd place, bronze medalist(s)		Alexandra Meissnitzer	Austria

Women's super-G
- Location: Hakuba – Happo-One; Olympic Course II
- Vertical: 587 m (1,926 ft)
- Top elevation: 1,486 m (4,875 ft)
- Base elevation: 899 m (2,949 ft)

The women's super-G competition of the Nagano 1998 Olympics was held at Hakuba on Wednesday, February 11.

The defending world champion was Isolde Kostner of Italy, while Germany's Hilde Gerg was the defending World Cup Super G champion. Defending Olympic champion Diann Roffe had retired from competition in 1994. This was the opening women's alpine event of these Olympics.

Picabo Street of the United States won the gold medal by one-hundredth of a second, Austria's Michaela Dorfmeister took the silver, and the bronze medalist was Alexandra Meissnitzer, also of Austria. Gerg was tenth and Kostner eleventh, while downhill gold medalist Katja Seizinger was sixth.

Street had never won a super-G event, though she had two World Cup podiums; her nine World Cup wins were all in downhill. Returning from injuries, this was the final podium of her career; she was sixth in the downhill, then broke her leg a month later in Switzerland, which ended her presence as a top competitor.

The Olympic Course II started at an elevation of 1,486 m (4,875 ft) above sea level with a vertical drop of 587 m (1,926 ft) and a length of 2.115 km (1.31 mi). Street's winning time was 78.02 seconds, yielding an average course speed of 97.590 km/h (60.6 mph), with an average vertical descent rate of 7.524 m/s (24.7 ft/s).

== Results ==
The race was started at 13:00 local time, (UTC +9). At the starting gate, the skies were clear, the temperature was −4.7 °C (24 °F), and the snow condition was hard; the temperature at the finish was −2.0 °C (28 °F).

Rank	Bib	Name	Country	Time	Difference
1st place, gold medalist(s)	2	Picabo Street	United States	1:18.02	—
2nd place, silver medalist(s)	18	Michaela Dorfmeister	Austria	1:18.03	+0.01
3rd place, bronze medalist(s)	5	Alexandra Meissnitzer	Austria	1:18.09	+0.07
4	6	Regina Häusl	Germany	1:18.27	+0.25
5	10	Renate Götschl	Austria	1:18.32	+0.30
6	11	Katja Seizinger	Germany	1:18.44	+0.42
7	9	Martina Ertl	Germany	1:18.46	+0.44
8	13	Mélanie Suchet	France	1:18.51	+0.49
9	19	Steffi Schuster	Austria	1:18.53	+0.51
10	12	Hilde Gerg	Germany	1:18.59	+0.57
11	8	Isolde Kostner	Italy	1:18.62	+0.60
12	16	Varvara Zelenskaya	Russia	1:18.72	+0.70
13	30	Svetlana Gladysheva	Russia	1:18.82	+0.80
14	14	Pernilla Wiberg	Sweden	1:18.88	+0.86
14	15	Carole Montillet	France	1:18.88	+0.86
16	25	Régine Cavagnoud	France	1:18.91	+0.89
17	24	Kristine Kristiansen	Norway	1:19.02	+1.00
18	17	Florence Masnada	France	1:19.03	+1.01
19	1	Ingeborg Helen Marken	Norway	1:19.16	+1.14
20	29	Mélanie Turgeon	Canada	1:19.20	+1.18
21	7	Heidi Zurbriggen	Switzerland	1:19.22	+1.20
22	21	Bibiana Perez	Italy	1:19.47	+1.45
23	20	Barbara Merlin	Italy	1:19.64	+1.62
24	26	Mojca Suhadolc	Slovenia	1:19.66	+1.64
25	28	Trude Gimle	Norway	1:19.71	+1.69
26	33	Janica Kostelić	Croatia	1:19.77	+1.75
27	34	Kate Pace-Lindsay	Canada	1:19.89	+1.87
28	4	Karen Putzer	Italy	1:20.16	+2.14
29	31	Katie Monahan	United States	1:20.25	+2.23
30	22	Špela Bračun	Slovenia	1:20.29	+2.27
31	27	Corinne Rey-Bellet	Switzerland	1:20.31	+2.29
32	32	Jonna Mendes	United States	1:20.35	+2.33
33	35	Anna Larionova	Russia	1:20.61	+2.59
34	23	Catherine Borghi	Switzerland	1:20.69	+2.67
35	36	Lucie Hrstková	Czech Republic	1:21.74	+3.72
36	37	Kumiko Kashiwagi	Japan	1:21.89	+3.87
37	40	Olesya Aliyeva	Russia	1:22.00	+3.98
38	38	Tamara Schädler	Liechtenstein	1:22.90	+4.88
39	43	Arijana Boras	Bosnia and Herzegovina	1:24.48	+6.46
40	39	Mónika Kovács	Hungary	1:24.77	+6.75
41	41	Carola Calello	Argentina	1:25.08	+7.06
-	3	Kirsten Clark	United States	DNF	-
-	43	Yuliya Krygina	Kazakhstan	DNF	-
-	42	Simona Pastinaru	Romania	DNS	
