= Alpine skiing at the 1998 Winter Olympics – Women's downhill =

Women's Downhill race at the XVIII Olympic Winter Games
- Alpine skiing
- Venue: Hakuba
- Date: February 16, 1998
- Competitors: 39 from 16 nations
- Winning time: 1:28.89

Medalists
1st place, gold medalist(s)		Katja Seizinger	Germany
2nd place, silver medalist(s)		Pernilla Wiberg	Sweden
3rd place, bronze medalist(s)		Florence Masnada	France

Women's Downhill
- Location: Hakuba – Happo-One; Olympic Course II
- Vertical: 691 m (2,267 ft)
- Top elevation: 1,590 m (5,217 ft)
- Base elevation: 899 m (2,949 ft)

The Women's Downhill competition of the Nagano 1998 Olympics was held at Happo-One at Hakuba on Monday, February 16. The race was delayed two days due to rain and fog.

The defending world champion was Hilary Lindh of the United States, while Austria's Renate Goetschl was the defending World Cup downhill champion.

Katja Seizinger successfully defended her Olympic title, Pernilla Wiberg took the silver, and Florence Masnada was the bronze medalist. Through 2019, Seizinger remains the only ski racer in history to repeat as an Olympic downhill gold medalist.

The Olympic Course II started at an elevation of 1,590 m (5,217 ft) above sea level with a vertical drop of 691 m (2,267 ft) and a length of 2.518 km (1.56 mi). Seizinger's winning time was 88.89 seconds, yielding an average course speed of 101.978 km/h (63.4 mph), with an average vertical descent rate of 7.774 m/s (25.5 ft/s).

== Results ==
The race was started at 10:30 local time, (UTC +9). At the starting gate, the skies were clear, the temperature was −5.3 °C (22 °F), and the snow condition was hard; the temperature at the finish was 2.5 °C (36 °F).

Rank	Bib	Name	Country	Time	Difference
1st place, gold medalist(s)	5	Katja Seizinger	Germany	1:28.89	—
2nd place, silver medalist(s)	15	Pernilla Wiberg	Sweden	1:29.18	+0.29
3rd place, bronze medalist(s)	2	Florence Masnada	France	1:29.37	+0.48
4	4	Mélanie Suchet	France	1:29.48	+0.59
5	27	Svetlana Gladysheva	Russia	1:29.50	+0.61
6	8	Picabo Street	United States	1:29.54	+0.65
7	12	Régine Cavagnoud	France	1:29.72	+0.83
8	1	Alexandra Meissnitzer	Austria	1:29.84	+0.95
9	7	Hilde Gerg	Germany	1:29.96	+1.07
9	11	Katrin Gutensohn	Germany	1:29.96	+1.07
11	29	Ingeborg Helen Marken	Norway	1:30.19	+1.30
12	3	Heidi Zurbriggen	Switzerland	1:30.25	+1.36
13	14	Varvara Zelenskaya	Russia	1:30.38	+1.49
14	10	Carole Montillet-Carles	France	1:30.65	+1.76
15	13	Steffi Schuster	Austria	1:30.73	+1.84
16	25	Trude Gimle	Norway	1:30.87	+1.98
17	35	Jonna Mendes	United States	1:30.89	+2.00
18	22	Michaela Dorfmeister	Austria	1:31.17	+2.28
19	17	Kate Pace-Lindsay	Canada	1:31.30	+2.41
20	21	Bibiana Perez	Italy	1:31.43	+2.54
21	24	Alessandra Merlin	Italy	1:31.44	+2.55
22	23	Mélanie Turgeon	Canada	1:31.45	+2.56
22	30	Catherine Borghi	Switzerland	1:31.45	+2.56
24	20	Špela Bračun	Slovenia	1:31.54	+2.65
25	33	Janica Kostelić	Croatia	1:31.97	+3.08
26	26	Katie Monahan	United States	1:32.22	+3.33
26	34	Morena Gallizio	Italy	1:32.22	+3.33
28	31	Kirsten Clark	United States	1:32.25	+3.36
29	32	Yekaterina Nesterenko	Russia	1:32.54	+3.65
30	18	Corinne Rey-Bellet	Switzerland	1:32.92	+4.03
31	36	Lucie Hrstková	Czech Republic	1:33.00	+4.11
32	28	Anna Larionova	Russia	1:34.36	+5.47
33	39	Yuliya Kharkivska	Ukraine	1:35.60	+6.71
34	37	Carola Calello	Argentina	1:36.71	+7.82
-	6	Renate Götschl	Austria	DNF	-
-	9	Isolde Kostner	Italy	DNF	-
-	16	Regina Häusl	Germany	DNF	-
-	19	Kristine Kristiansen	Norway	DNF	-
-	38	Mónika Kovács	Hungary	DQ	-
