= Oberhofer (surname) =

Oberhofer is a German surname, common in the region of Tyrol. Notable people include:

- Emil Oberhoffer, American musician
- Herbert Oberhofer, Austrian footballer
- Karin Oberhofer, Italian biathlete
- Marion Oberhofer, Italian luger
- Renate Oberhofer, Italian skier

== See also ==
- Oberhofer, American band
