= Gatel =

Gatel is a French surname.

== List of people with the surname ==
- Françoise Gatel (born 1953), French politician, member of the Senate
- Maud Gatel (born 1979), French politician
- Marie-Pierre Gatel (born 1968), French alpine skier

== See also ==
- Patel
