= Masnada =

Masnada may refer to:

- Masnada or Condottieri, Italian mercenary leader
- Fausto Masnada, Italian cyclist
- Florence Masnada, French alpine skier
