= Carole Montillet =

French alpine skier

Medal record

Women's alpine skiing

Representing France

Olympic Games
Gold medal – first place	2002 Salt Lake City	Downhill

World Championships
Bronze medal – third place	2005 Bormio	Team event

Carole Montillet-Carles (born 7 April 1973) is a French World Cup alpine ski racer and Olympic gold medalist.

== Career ==
Born in Corrençon-en-Vercors, Isère, she became a member of the Villard-de-Lans ski club in Grenoble. At her Olympic debut in 1998 at Nagano, Japan, she finished 14th in both the super-G and downhill.

In January 2002, Montillet was chosen by the Comité National Olympique et Sportif Français to be the flag bearer at Salt Lake City. Her victory in the downhill days later was her first major triumph and the first alpine gold medal by a Frenchwoman since Marielle Goitschel's slalom gold in Grenoble in 1968. She dedicated the win to her late teammate Régine Cavagnoud, the reigning world champion in super-G, who died after a training accident less than four months earlier.

Montillet's achievements were more remarkable because she has suffered multiple serious injuries early in her career, such as torn knee ligaments.

While training for the downhill at the 2006 Winter Olympics, Montillet-Carles crashed on 13 February and was evacuated by helicopter to a nearby hospital. She suffered rib, back, and facial injuries, but still opted to defend her title two days later, but finished 28th. Several racers had complained that the downhill course was too easy, and Olympic organizers had made several changes to it. She finished fifth in the super-G five days later, then retired from competition at the end of the World Cup season.

== World Cup results ==
=== Season titles ===
Season	Discipline
2003	Super-G

=== Season standings ===
Season	Age	Overall	Slalom	Giant Slalom	Super G	Downhill	Combined
1992	18	105	—	—	39	21	21
1993	19	59	—	39	10	8	8
1994	20	59	—	33	12	27	28
1995	21	67	—	52	9	20	—
1996	22	31	—	36	22	26	—
1997	23	15	—	47	15	15	—
1998	24	26	—	52	21	9	—
1999	25	26	—	16	4	8	—
2000	26	55	—	11	4	5	10
2001	27	9	—	—	3	4	—
2002	28	16	—	16	9	13	—
2003	29	6	—	28	1	4	—
2004	30	5	—	25	2	3	—
2005	31	18	—	—	16	7	—
2006	32	37	—	—	22	20	—

=== Race victories ===
- 8 wins – (4 DH, 4 SG)
- 25 podiums – (13 DH, 12 SG)

Season	Date	Location	Discipline
2001	16 Feb 2001	(Germany) Garmisch-Partenkirchen	Super-G
2003	7 Dec 2002	(Canada) Lake Louise	Downhill
2003	13 Dec 2002	(France) Val d'Isère	Super-G
2003	15 Jan 2003	(Italy) Cortina d'Ampezzo	Super-G
2004	5 Dec 2003	(Canada) Lake Louise	Downhill
2004	6 Dec 2003	(Canada) Lake Louise	Downhill
2004	18 Jan 2004	(Italy) Cortina d'Ampezzo	Downhill
2004	1 Feb 2004	(Austria) Haus im Ennstal	Super-G

== World Championship results ==
Year	Age	Slalom	Giant Slalom	Super G	Downhill	Combined	Team event
1993	19	—	—	—	8	—	not run
1996	22	—	—	11	20	—	not run
1997	23	—	—	4	7	—	not run
1999	25	—	—	15	22	—	not run
2001	27	—	—	5	10	—	not run
2003	29	—	19	14	7	—	not run
2005	31	—	—	DNF	21	—	3

== Olympic results ==
Year	Age	Slalom	Giant Slalom	Super G	Downhill	Combined
1998	24	—	—	14	14	—
2002	28	—	18	7	1	—
2006	32	—	—	5	28	—
