= Yekaterina Nesterenko =

Russian alpine skier (born 1976)

Personal information
- Nationality: Russian
- Born: 11 October 1976 (age 49) Tambov, Russia

Sport
- Sport: Alpine skiing
- Event: Downhill

Achievements and titles
- Olympic finals: 1998 Winter Olympics

Yekaterina Nesterenko (Russian: Екатерина Нестеренко; born 11 October 1976 in Tambov) is a Russian former alpine skier who competed in the 1998 Winter Olympics, where she finished 29th in the Women's downhill.
