= Barbara Brlec =

Slovenian alpine skier (born 1972)

Barbara Brlec (born 14 April 1972 in Domžale) is a former Slovenian alpine skier who competed in the women's super-G and the women's giant slalom at the 1992 Winter Olympics.
