= Marcella Biondi =

Italian alpine skier (born 1970)

Personal information
- Born: 3 June 1970 (age 55)

Sport
- Country: Italy

Marcella Biondi (born 3 June 1970) is a retired Italian alpine skier.

She made her FIS Alpine Ski World Cup debut in March 1992 in Crans-Montana, collecting her first World Cup points with a 26th place. Between January 1993 and February 1995 she managed four more World Cup placements in the top 30. The last, a 28th place in February 1995 in Maribor, was also her last World Cup outing.
