= Titti Rodling =

Swedish alpine skier (born 1970)

Anna Christina "Titti" Rodling (born 19 December 1970 in Bräcke) is a Swedish former alpine skier who competed in the 1994 Winter Olympics. She has served as Chief operating officer of SLAO since 2016.
