= Marie-Pierre Gatel =

French alpine skier (born 1968)

Marie-Pierre Gatel (born 16 December 1968 in Grenoble) is a French retired alpine skier who competed in the 1992 Winter Olympics.
