= Anna Larionova =

Russian alpine skier (born 1975)

Anna Larionova (born 3 June 1975) is a retired Russian alpine skier who competed in the 1998 Winter Olympics.
