= Katrin Neuenschwander =

Swiss alpine skier (born 1971)

Katrin Neuenschwander (born 29 June 1971 in Konolfingen) is a Swiss retired alpine skier who competed in the 1992 Winter Olympics, finishing 9th in the women's slalom.
