= Roberta Serra =

Italian alpine skier (born 1970)

Roberta Serra (born 24 April 1970) is an Italian former alpine skier who competed in the 1994 Winter Olympics.
