= FIS Alpine World Ski Championships 1999 =

Skiing event in Colorado, USA

- Host city: Vail, Colorado, U.S.
- Nations: 56
- Events: 10
- Opening: February 1, 1999
- Closing: February 14, 1999
- Opened by: Bill Clinton
- Main venue: Vail (7 events); Beaver Creek (3)

Location in the United States

The FIS Alpine World Ski Championships 1999 were held February 2–14 in Vail and Beaver Creek, Colorado, U.S.A.

Lasse Kjus of Norway placed in the top two in all five events, winning two gold medals and taking three silvers. Hermann Maier of Austria won gold medals in the two speed events, the downhill and super-G (a dead-heat tie with Kjus). Austria dominated the women's two speed events with a sweep of all six medals. The men's downhill, super-G, and combined events were held at Beaver Creek, and the seven other events were at Vail.

This was the third non-Olympic World Championships held in the United States, all in Colorado. (The 1960 Winter Olympics in Squaw Valley, California, and the 1980 Winter Olympics in Lake Placid, New York, are also officially considered World Championships). Vail hosted a decade earlier in 1989 and Aspen in 1950, the first held outside of Europe. As a host country, the U.S. has won just two medals in the three World Championships, a gold and a bronze by Tamara McKinney in 1989.

The Birds of Prey downhill course at Beaver Creek was developed for these championships, its first World Cup races were in December 1997. Designed by Olympic gold medalist Bernhard Russi, it has been a regular stop on the men's World Cup schedule and was used again for the World Championships in 2015.

== Men's competitions ==
=== Downhill ===
Saturday, February 6, 1999
Beaver Creek

| Place | Name | Country | Time | Diff. |
|---|---|---|---|---|
| 1st place, gold medalist(s) | Hermann Maier | Austria | 1:40.60 | -- |
| 2nd place, silver medalist(s) | Lasse Kjus | Norway | 1:40.91 | + 0.31 |
| 3rd place, bronze medalist(s) | Kjetil André Aamodt | Norway | 1:41.17 | + 0.57 |

=== Super-G ===
Tuesday, February 2, 1999
Beaver Creek

| Place | Name | Country | Time | Diff. |
|---|---|---|---|---|
| 1st place, gold medalist(s) | Lasse Kjus | Norway | 1:14.53 | -- |
| 1st place, gold medalist(s) | Hermann Maier | Austria | 1:14.53 | -- |
| 3rd place, bronze medalist(s) | Hans Knauss | Austria | 1:14.54 | + 0.01 |

=== Giant Slalom ===
Friday, February 12, 1999
Vail

| Place | Name | Country | Time | Diff. | Run 1 | Run 2 |
|---|---|---|---|---|---|---|
| 1st place, gold medalist(s) | Lasse Kjus | Norway | 2:19.31 | 0.00 | 1:11.56 | 1:07.75 |
| 2nd place, silver medalist(s) | Marco Büchel | Liechtenstein | 2:19.36 | + 0.05 | 1:11.31 | 1:08.85 |
| 3rd place, bronze medalist(s) | Steve Locher | Switzerland | 2:20.79 | + 1.48 | 1:11.97 | 1:08.82 |

=== Slalom ===
Sunday February 14, 1999
Vail

| Place | Name | Country | Time | Diff. | Run 1 | Run 2 |
|---|---|---|---|---|---|---|
| 1st place, gold medalist(s) | Kalle Palander | Finland | 1:42.12 | -- | 52.20 | 49.92 |
| 2nd place, silver medalist(s) | Lasse Kjus | Norway | 1:42.23 | + 0.11 | 51.42 | 50.81 |
| 3rd place, bronze medalist(s) | Christian Mayer | Austria | 1:42.25 | + 0.13 | 51.61 | 50.64 |

=== Combined ===
Monday & Tuesday, February 8–9, 1999
Beaver Creek

| Place | Name | Country | Time | Diff. | Downhill | Slalom |
|---|---|---|---|---|---|---|
| 1st place, gold medalist(s) | Kjetil André Aamodt | Norway | 2:43.09 | -- | 1:13.52 | 1:29.57 |
| 2nd place, silver medalist(s) | Lasse Kjus | Norway | 2:43.25 | + 0.16 | 1:13.58 | 1:29.67 |
| 3rd place, bronze medalist(s) | Paul Accola | Switzerland | 2:43.62 | + 0.53 | 1:14.38 | 1:29.24 |

== Women's competitions ==
=== Downhill ===
Sunday, February 7, 1999
Vail

| Place | Athlete | Country | Time | Diff. |
|---|---|---|---|---|
| 1st place, gold medalist(s) | Renate Götschl | Austria | 1:48.20 | -- |
| 2nd place, silver medalist(s) | Michaela Dorfmeister | Austria | 1:48.35 | + 0.15 |
| 3rd place, bronze medalist(s) | Stefanie Schuster | Austria | 1:48.37 | + 0.17 |

=== Super-G ===
Wednesday, February 3, 1999
Vail

| Place | Athlete | Country | Time | Diff. |
|---|---|---|---|---|
| 1st place, gold medalist(s) | Alexandra Meissnitzer | Austria | 1:20.53 | -- |
| 2nd place, silver medalist(s) | Renate Götschl | Austria | 1:20.56 | + 0.03 |
| 3rd place, bronze medalist(s) | Michaela Dorfmeister | Austria | 1:20.74 | + 0.21 |

=== Giant Slalom ===
Thursday, February 11, 1999
Vail

| Place | Athlete | Country | Time | Diff. | Run 1 | Run 2 |
|---|---|---|---|---|---|---|
| 1st place, gold medalist(s) | Alexandra Meissnitzer | Austria | 2:08.54 | -- | 1:01.93 | 1:06.61 |
| 2nd place, silver medalist(s) | Andrine Flemmen | Norway | 2:08.84 | + 0.30 | 1:02.27 | 1:06.57 |
| 3rd place, bronze medalist(s) | Anita Wachter | Austria | 2:09.13 | + 0.59 | 1:01.72 | 1:07.41 |

=== Slalom ===
Saturday, February 13, 1999
Vail

| Place | Athlete | Country | Time | Diff. | Run 1 | Run 2 |
|---|---|---|---|---|---|---|
| 1st place, gold medalist(s) | Zali Steggall | Australia | 1:33.97 | -- | 46.44 | 47.53 |
| 2nd place, silver medalist(s) | Pernilla Wiberg | Sweden | 1:34.77 | + 0.80 | 46.44 | 48.33 |
| 3rd place, bronze medalist(s) | Trine Bakke | Norway | 1:35.00 | + 1.03 | 46.31 | 48.69 |

=== Combined ===
Friday, February 5, 1999
Vail

| Place | Athlete | Country | Time | Diff. | Downhill | Slalom |
|---|---|---|---|---|---|---|
| 1st place, gold medalist(s) | Pernilla Wiberg | Sweden | 3:08.52 | -- | 1:35.10 | 1:33.42 |
| 2nd place, silver medalist(s) | Renate Götschl | Austria | 3:08.67 | + 0.15 | 1:33.66 | 1:35.01 |
| 3rd place, bronze medalist(s) | Florence Masnada | France | 3:08.97 | + 0.45 | 1:35.12 | 1:33.85 |

== Medals table ==
| Place | Nation | Gold | Silver | Bronze | Total |
|---|---|---|---|---|---|
| 1 | Austria | 5 | 3 | 5 | 13 |
| 2 | Norway | 3 | 4 | 2 | 9 |
| 3 | Sweden | 1 | 1 | - | 2 |
| 4 | Australia | 1 | - | - | 1 |
| 4 | Finland | 1 | - | - | 1 |
| 6 | Liechtenstein | - | 1 | - | 4 |
| 7 | Switzerland | - | - | 2 | 2 |
| 8 | France | - | - | 1 | 1 |
