= Nataša Bokal =

Slovenian alpine skier (1967–2026)

Personal information
- Born: 9 May 1967 Škofja Loka, SR Slovenia, SFR Yugoslavia
- Died: 31 January 2026 (aged 58)
- Height: 1.72 m (5 ft 8 in)

Skiing career
- Sport: Alpine skiing
- Disciplines: Downhill, super-G, giant slalom, slalom, combined
- World Cup debut: 9 January 1990

Olympics
- Teams: 5

World Championships
- Teams: 8
- Medals: 1

World Cup
- Seasons: 13
- Wins: 1
Medal record
Women's alpine skiing
Representing Yugoslavia
World Championships
Silver medal – second place	1991 Saalbach-Hinterglemm	Slalom

Nataša Bokal (9 May 1967 – 31 January 2026) was a Slovenian alpine skier. She was the first woman to represent Slovenia at the Olympics.

Bokal died on 31 January 2026, at the age of 58, following a long battle with cancer.

== World Cup results ==
=== Season standings ===
Season	Age	Overall	Slalom	Giant slalom	Super-G	Downhill	Combined
1990	22	38	13	—	—	—	—
1991	23	19	14	8	—	—	—
1992	24	27	9	39	—	—	14
1993	25	58	21	42	—	—	—
1994	26	88	42	—	—	—	—
1995	27	87	40	47	—	—	—
1996	28	49	22	27	—	—	—
1997	29	50	22	—	—	—	—
1998	30	63	25	37	—	—	—
1999	31	40	13	31	—	—	—
2000	32	37	9	65	—	—	—
2001	33	101	41	—	—	—	—
2002	34	82	28	—	—	—	—
2003	35	100	46	—	—	—	—

=== Race podiums ===
Season	Date	Location	Discipline	Position
1991	11 January 1991	(Socialist Federal Republic of Yugoslavia) Kranjska Gora, Yugoslavia	Giant slalom	2nd
1991	12 January 1991	(Socialist Federal Republic of Yugoslavia) Kranjska Gora, Yugoslavia	Slalom	1st
2000	29 December 1999	Lienz, Austria	Slalom	2nd

== Olympic Games results ==
Season	Age	Slalom	Giant slalom	Super-G	Downhill	Combined
1992	24	DNF2	13	32	—	7
1994	26	did not compete				
1998	30	11	20	—	—	—
2002	34	9	—	—	—	—

== World Championships results ==
Season	Age	Slalom	Giant slalom	Super-G	Downhill	Combined
1991	23	2	12	—	—	—
1993	25	—	—	—	—	—
1996	28	10	DNS2	—	—	—
1997	30	DNF2	18	—	—	—
1999	32	13	20	—	—	—
