= Renate Oberhofer =

Italian alpine skier (born 1970)

Renate Oberhofer (born 4 February 1970) is a retired Italian alpine skier.

She competed at the 1987, 1988 and 1989 Junior World Championships, managing the gold medal in slalom in 1988.

In the FIS Alpine Ski World Cup she finished in the top 20 several times in 1991, 1992 and 1993.
