= Nancy Gee =

Canadian alpine skier (born 1968)

Personal information
- Born: 10 April 1968 (age 58) Pointe-Claire, Québec, Canada
- Height: 160 cm (5 ft 3 in)
- Weight: 56 kg (123 lb)

Sport
- Sport: Skiing
- Club: Devil's Glen Ski Club
Medal record
Women's alpine skiing
Representing Canada
Winter Pan American Games
| Silver medal – second place | 1990 Las Leñas | Giant slalom |

Nancy Gee (born 10 April 1968) is a Canadian former alpine skier who competed in the 1988 Winter Olympics.
