= FIS Alpine World Ski Championships 1989 =

Skiing event in Vail, Colorado, USA

Coordinates: 39.64°N 106.37°W

- Host city: Vail, Colorado
- Country: United States
- Events: 10
- Opening: February 2, 1989
- Closing: February 12, 1989
- Opened by: Gerald Ford
- Main venue: Vail

Location in the United States
Location in Colorado

The FIS Alpine World Ski Championships 1989 were held February 2–12 in the United States at Vail, Colorado. Outside of the Winter Olympics of 1960 and 1980, the alpine world championships returned to the U.S. for the first time since 1950, which were also in Colorado at Aspen. Vail's first championship served to re-introduce Colorado to a European audience, with coverage of the events broadcast during prime time due to the difference in time zones. The championship was marked by the death of the president of the Spanish Olympic Committee Alfonso, Duke of Anjou and Cádiz, who was beheaded by a cable which he collided with as it was being raised to support a finish line banner.

Vail and Beaver Creek later hosted the World Championships a decade later, in 1999, and again in 2015.

== Men's competitions ==
=== Downhill ===
Monday, February 6

Medal	Name	Country	Time	Diff
Gold	Hans-Jörg Tauscher	West Germany	2:10.39	–
Silver	Peter Müller	Switzerland	2:10.58	+ 0.19
Bronze	Karl Alpiger	Switzerland	2:10.67	+ 0.28

=== Super-G ===
Wednesday, February 8

Medal	Name	Country	Time
Gold	Martin Hangl	Switzerland	1:38.81
Silver	Pirmin Zurbriggen	Switzerland	1:39.09
Bronze	Tomaž Čižman	Yugoslavia	1:39.18

=== Giant Slalom ===
Thursday, February 9

Medal	Name	Country	Time	Run 1	Run 2
Gold	Rudolf Nierlich	Austria	2:37.66	1:17.07	1:20.59
Silver	Helmut Mayer	Austria	2:39.28	1:19.14	1:20.14
Bronze	Pirmin Zurbriggen	Switzerland	2:39.38	1:18.33	1:21,05

=== Slalom ===
Sunday, February 12

Medal	Name	Country	Time	Run 1	Run 2
Gold	Rudolf Nierlich	Austria	2:02.85	57.57	1:05.28
Silver	Armin Bittner	West Germany	2:03.29	57.32	1:05.97
Bronze	Marc Girardelli	Luxembourg	2:03.65	58.23	1:05.42

=== Combination ===
Monday, January 30, and Friday, February 3

Medal	Name	Country	Points
Gold	Marc Girardelli	Luxembourg	4.72
Silver	Paul Accola	Switzerland	16.26
Bronze	Günther Mader	Austria	31.49

== Women's competitions ==
=== Downhill ===
Sunday, February 5

Medal	Name	Country	Time
Gold	Maria Walliser	Switzerland	1:46.50
Silver	Karen Percy	Canada	1:48.00
Bronze	Karin Dedler	West Germany	1:48.01

=== Super-G ===
Wednesday, February 8

Medal	Name	Country	Time
Gold	Ulrike Maier	Austria	1:19.46
Silver	Sigrid Wolf	Austria	1:19.49
Bronze	Michaela Gerg	West Germany	1:19.50

=== Giant Slalom ===
Saturday, February 11

Medal	Name	Country	Time	Run 1	Run 2
Gold	Vreni Schneider	Switzerland	2:29.37	1:12.84	1:16.53
Silver	Carole Merle	France	2:30.50	1:13.35	1:17.15
Bronze	Mateja Svet	Yugoslavia	2:31.92	1:14.21	1:17.71

=== Slalom ===
Tuesday, February 7

Medal	Name	Country	Time	Run 1	Run 2
Gold	Mateja Svet	Yugoslavia	1:30.88	44.02	46.86
Silver	Vreni Schneider	Switzerland	1:31.49	45.45	46.04
Bronze	Tamara McKinney	United States	1:31.56	43.98	47.58

=== Combination ===
Sunday, January 29, and Thursday, February 2

Medal	Name	Country	Points
Gold	Tamara McKinney	United States	5.65
Silver	Vreni Schneider	Switzerland	26.63
Bronze	Brigitte Oertli	Switzerland	32.88

== Medals table ==
Place	Nation	Gold	Silver	Bronze	Total
1	Switzerland	3	5	3	11
2	Austria	3	2	1	6
3	West Germany	1	1	2	4
4	Yugoslavia	1	–	2	3
5	Luxembourg	1	–	1	2
	United States	1	–	1	2
7	France	–	1	–	1
	Canada	–	1	–	1
