= Régine Cavagnoud =

French alpine skier (1970–2001)

Personal information
- Born: 27 June 1970 Thônes, Haute-Savoie, France
- Died: 31 October 2001 (aged 31) Innsbruck, Tyrol, Austria
- Height: 1.63 m (5 ft 4 in)

Skiing career
- Sport: Alpine skiing
- Club: S.C. La Clusaz
- Disciplines: Downhill, super-G, giant slalom, combined
- World Cup debut: 22 December 1990 (aged 20)

Olympics
- Teams: 3 – (1992, 1994, 1998)
- Medals: 0

World Championships
- Teams: 5 – (1991–1997, 2001)
- Medals: 1 (1 gold)

World Cup
- Seasons: 11 – (1991–2001)
- Wins: 8 – (3 DH, 4 SG, 1 GS)
- Podiums: 23 – (8 DH, 12 SG, 3 GS)
- Overall titles: 0 – (3rd in 2000, 2001)
- Discipline titles: 1 – (SG, 2001)
Medal record
Women's alpine skiing
Representing France
World Championships
Gold medal – first place	2001 St. Anton	Super-G

Régine Cavagnoud (27 June 1970 – 31 October 2001) was a World Cup alpine ski racer from France. She was the World Cup and World Champion in Super-G in 2001. Later that year, Cavagnoud was involved in a high-speed collision while training and died two days later. She competed at three Winter Olympics and five world championships.

== Career ==
Born in Thônes, Haute-Savoie, Cavagnoud's career was plagued by injuries. She finally secured a World Cup race victory in her tenth year of competition, a downhill at Cortina d'Ampezzo, Italy, in January 1999. That was the first World Cup downhill race victory by a Frenchwoman in 17 years. Cavagnoud had eight World Cup victories: four in Super-G, three in downhill, and two in giant slalom. Her last victory was in March 2001 in giant slalom at the national championships in Courchevel, France. She topped the super-G season standings in 2001 and was ranked third overall in 2000 and 2001. At the 2001 World Championships in St. Anton, Austria, she won the Super-G title on 29 January.

== Death ==
On 29 October 2001, Cavagnoud collided with German ski coach Markus Anwander during ski training in Pitztal, Austria, as he crossed the piste. Both sustained serious head injuries and were evacuated by helicopter to Innsbruck's university hospital, where Cavagnoud was found to have serious brain damage and succumbed to her injuries two days later.

Her death was the first fatality involving a World Cup ski racer in over seven years, since the death of Austria's Ulrike Maier in a downhill race in January 1994.

Cavagnoud was buried near her native village at La Clusaz in the French Alps.

== World Cup results ==
=== Season titles ===
Season	Discipline
2001	Super-G

=== Season standings ===
Season	Age	Overall	Slalom	Giant Slalom	Super-G	Downhill	Combined
1991	20	50	—	—	—	19	20
1992	21	51	—	—	39	21	21
1993	22	13	—	39	10	8	8
1994	23	28	—	33	12	27	28
1995	24	26	—	52	9	20	—
1996	25	46	—	36	22	26	—
1997	26	27	—	47	15	15	—
1998	27	28	—	52	21	9	—
1999	28	7	—	16	4	8	—
2000	29	3	—	11	4	5	10
2001	30	3	—	15	1	3	7

=== Race victories ===
- 8 wins – (3 DH, 4 SG, 1 GS)
- 23 podiums – (8 DH, 12 SG, 3 GS)

Season	Date	Location	Discipline
1999	21 Jan 1999	Cortina d'Ampezzo, Italy	Downhill
1999	23 Jan 1999	Cortina d'Ampezzo, Italy	Super-G
2000	19 Nov 1999	(United States) Copper Mountain, USA	Giant slalom
2000	22 Jan 2000	Cortina d'Ampezzo, Italy	Downhill
2000	15 Mar 2000	Bormio, Italy	Downhill
2001	6 Dec 2000	Val-d'Isère, France	Super G
2001	13 Jan 2001	Haus im Ennstal, Austria	Super G
2001	20 Jan 2001	Cortina d'Ampezzo, Italy	Super G

== World Championship results ==
Year	Age	Slalom	Giant slalom	Super-G	Downhill	Combined
1991	20	—	—	12	—	10
1993	22	—	—	15	11	—
1996	25	—	—	25	26	—
1997	26	—	—	21	26	—
1999	28	injured, did not compete				
2001	30	—	17	1	12	—

== Olympic results ==
Year	Age	Slalom	Giant slalom	Super-G	Downhill	Combined
1992	21	—	—	26	17	10
1994	23	—	18	11	26	—
1998	27	—	—	16	7	—
