= Sigrid Wolf =

Austrian alpine skier

Personal information
- Born: 14 February 1964 (age 62) Breitenwang, Austria
- Height: 1.72 m (5 ft 8 in)

Skiing career
- Sport: Alpine skiing
- Club: Skiverein Elbigenalp
- Retired: 1992
- Disciplines: Speed events
- World Cup debut: 1981

Olympics
- Teams: 1
- Medals: 1 (1 gold)

World Championships
- Teams: 3
- Medals: 1

World Cup
- Seasons: 12
- Wins: 5
- Podiums: 13
Medal record
Women's alpine skiing
Representing Austria
World Cup race podiums
Event	1st	2nd	3rd
Downhill	2	1	1
Super-G	3	4	2
Total	5	5	3
International competitions
Event	1st	2nd	3rd
Olympic Games	1	0	0
World Championships	0	1	0
Total	1	1	0
Olympic Games
Gold medal – first place	1988 Calgary	Super-G
World Championships
Silver medal – second place	1989 Vail	Super-G

Sigrid Wolf (born 14 February 1964) is an Austrian former Alpine skier.

== Career ==
Her first points in the Alpine Skiing World Cup she could gain on 25 March 1982, in the Downhill Race at San Sicario by finishing 14th. Her first "Top Ten" was on 5 March 1983, in the Downhill at Mont Tremblant. She came in the spotlight when she placed fourth in the downhill in Santa Caterina in 1985, being 0.01 sec. behind a medal (there was a tied silver medal between Ariane Ehrat and Katharina Gutensohn. Being double winner in the World Cup Downhill races at Vail on 13 and 14 March 1987, she did stop a four-month phase without a win for the female Austrian team. Winning the super-G race at Sestriere on 28 November 1987, was the first win for the female team of the Austrian Ski Federation in the World Cup since that discipline was established in the season 1982-83 (it was the race number 19). - She did win another race too; it happened on 9 January 1988, at Lech but she was disqualified at last because violation of the regulation in regard to non correct attaching the bib-number; Zoë Haas became the winner (that case is known as the »Stecknadelaffäre von Lech« / »pin scandal of Lech« by insiders - because Sigrid and other racers of the Austrian team did attach the oversized bib-numbers with pins but such a method wasn't allowed). Sigrid Wolf won the super-G gold medal at the 1988 Olympics in Calgary ahead of Michela Figini and Karen Percy. This was the first time it was ever arranged a Super-G competition at the Olympic games. One year later she won a silver medal in the same discipline at the World Championships in Vail, Colorado.

In the saison 1988-89 she became second in the super-G World Cup. Wolf was chosen as Austrian Sportswoman of the Year in 1987 and 1988, and in 1996 was awarded a gold medal for services to the Austrian Republic. She retired in December 1990 due to a knee injury.

== World Cup victories ==
Date	Location	Race
13 March 1987	(United States) Vail	Downhill
14 March 1987	(United States) Vail	Downhill
28 November 1987	(Italy) Sestriere	Super-G
25 February 1989	(United States) Steamboat Springs	Super-G
27 January 1990	(Italy) Santa Caterina	Super-G

Awards
Preceded by (Austria) Roswitha Steiner	Austrian Sportswoman of the year 1987–1988	Succeeded by (Austria) Ulrike Maier
