= Hilary Lindh =

American alpine skier (born 1969)

Personal information
- Full name: Hilary Kirsten Lindh
- Born: May 10, 1969 (age 57) Juneau, Alaska, U.S.
- Height: 1.75 m (5 ft 9 in)

Skiing career
- Sport: Alpine skiing
- Retired: March 1997 (age 27)
- Disciplines: Downhill, Super-G
- World Cup debut: March 15, 1986 (age 16)

Olympics
- Teams: 3 - (1988, '92, '94)
- Medals: 1 (0 gold)

World Championships
- Teams: 4 - (1989, '91, '96, '97)
- Medals: 2 (1 gold)

World Cup
- Seasons: 11 - (1987-97)
- Wins: 3 - (3 DH)
- Podiums: 5 - (5 DH)
- Overall titles: 0 - (9th, 1995)
- Discipline titles: 0 - (2nd in DH, 1995)
Medal record
Women's alpine skiing
Representing the United States
Olympic Games
Silver medal – second place	1992 Albertville	Downhill
World Championships
Gold medal – first place	1997 Sestriere	Downhill
Bronze medal – third place	1996 Sierra Nevada	Downhill
Winter Pan American Games
Bronze medal – third place	1990 Las Leñas	Slalom Downhill

Hilary Kirsten Lindh (born May 10, 1969) is an American former alpine ski racer. A specialist in the downhill event, she was a world champion and Olympic medalist.

== Life ==
Born in Juneau, Alaska, Lindh learned to ski and race at Eaglecrest Ski Area on Douglas Island. She was just 14 when she was named to the U.S. Ski Team. By 16, she had become the first American to win a World Junior Championships downhill title. All this was done while with Kathy Miklossy and Alex Mitkus in Utah, away from her parents. She represented the U.S. in three Olympics and won the silver medal in the downhill at the 1992 Olympics in Albertville, France. In 1994, she won the 100th World Cup race by an American skier, one of three World Cup victories during her career. She was the only American to win a medal at the 1997 World Championships, capturing the gold medal in the women's downhill in Sestriere, Italy.

During her 11 years in World Cup racing, Lindh had three victories, five podiums, and 27 top ten finishes. She retired from international competition after the 1997 World Cup season. She earned a bachelor's degree in biology at the University of Utah and a master's degree in conservation ecology in Canada, and is an environmental consultant. Married with a daughter, she resides in Whitehorse, Yukon; her husband is the mountain operations manager at the Mt. Sima ski area.

Lindh was inducted into the National Ski Hall of Fame in 2005.

Lindh is a granddaughter of performer and patron of the arts Connie Boochever and Federal appeals court judge Robert Boochever.

== World Cup victories ==
Season	Date	Location	Discipline
1994	February 4, 1994	Sierra Nevada, Spain	Downhill
1995	December 2, 1994	Vail, USA	Downhill
1995	December 10, 1994	Lake Louise, Canada	Downhill

== Other results ==
- 1986 U.S. National Champion and World Junior Champion in Downhill at age 16 in a three-week span.
- Four U.S. National Championships titles.
