= Regine Mösenlechner =

German alpine skier

Personal information
- Born: 1 April 1961 (age 65) Inzell, West Germany

Skiing career
- Sport: Alpine skiing
- Disciplines: Speed events

World Cup
- Wins: 1
- Podiums: 8
Medal record
Women's alpine skiing
Representing West Germany
World Cup race podiums
Event	1st	2nd	3rd
Downhill	0	4	1
Super-G	1	0	2
Total	1	4	3
World Championships
Bronze medal – third place	1987 Crans-Montana	Downhill

Regine Mösenlechner (born 1 April 1961) is a retired German alpine skier.

== Career ==
During her career she has achieved 8 results among the top 3 (1 victory) in the World Cup. She is married to Armin Bittner.

== World Cup victories ==
Date	Location	Race
December 2, 1989	(United States) Vail	Super-G
