= Carole Merle =

French alpine skier

Personal information
- Born: 24 January 1964 (age 62) Le Sauze, Alpes-de-Haute-Provence, France

Skiing career
- Sport: Alpine skiing
- Retired: 1994
- Disciplines: Super-G, giant slalom Downhill, combined

Olympics
- Teams: 4 - (1984, 1988, 1992, 1994)
- Medals: 1

World Championships
- Teams: 4 - (1987, 1989, 1991, 1993)
- Medals: 3 (1 gold)

World Cup
- Seasons: 13 - (1982–1994)
- Wins: 22 - (12 SG, 10 GS)
- Overall titles: 0 - (2nd in 1992, 3rd in 1993)
- Discipline titles: 6 - (4 SG, 2 GS)
Medal record
Women's alpine skiing
Representing France
World Cup race podiums
Event	1st	2nd	3rd
Giant slalom	10	2	7
Downhill	0	8	1
Super-G	12	2	2
Total	22	12	10
International competitionswwww
Event	1st	2nd	3rd
Olympic Games	0	1	0
World Championships	1	2	0
World Junior Championships	0	0	1
European Junior Championships	1	0	0
Total	2	3	1
Olympic Games
Silver medal – second place	1992 Albertville	SG
World Championships
Gold medal – first place	1993 Morioka-Shizukuishi	GS
Silver medal – second place	1989 Vail	GS
Silver medal – second place	1991 Saalbach-Hinterglemm	SG

Carole Merle (French pronunciation: [ka.ʁɔl mɛʁl]; born 24 January 1964) is a former French Alpine skier. A specialist of Giant slalom and Super-G, she won 22 World Cup races, 6 World Cup season titles and 1 World Championship gold medal.

== Skiing career ==
A native of Le Sauze, a ski resort of Enchastrayes commune where her parents ran a hotel, Merle learned to ski at a very young age. She took part in her first competition as a six-year-old, and made her World Cup debut at 18. On 23 January 1983, she took her first World Cup podium with a third-place finish in giant slalom at St. Gervais. But it took another few years for her to reach her full potential.

Her first World Cup win came on 6 January 1988 at Tignes. The following season saw her bag the World cup title in Super-G, finishing 4 points ahead of 1988 Olympic champion Sigrid Wolf. Merle went on to win the Super-G season title 4 years in a row (1989–1992), a feat only equalled in later years by Katja Seizinger of Germany (1993–1996) and Lindsey Vonn of the USA (2009–2012). In addition, Merle won the giant slalom World Cup in 1992 and 1993. These two same years, she finished 2nd (behind Austria's Petra Kronberger) and 3rd in the World Cup overall standings.

At the 1989 World Championships in Vail she won a silver medal in the giant slalom, two years later at the 1991 World Championships in Saalbach she won another medal and at the 1993 World Championships in Morioka she finally won the gold medal in the giant slalom. At the 1992 Olympics in Albertville she won a silver medal in the Super-G event.

== Later life ==
Merle retired at the end of the 1994 ski season. During her career, she had earnings of more than 20 million French francs, which an uncle was managing on her behalf. In 1997, she made headlines when she publicly announced she had lost everything and had accumulated more than 70 million in debts, accusing her uncle of mismanaging her fortune.

She later settled away from the ski slopes, in a Camargue farmhouse, to pursue her passion for horses. In a 2012 interview for French newspaper Le Dauphiné libéré, she claimed she had not skied for at least six years, but added she would never miss a ski World Cup on TV.

== World Cup results ==
=== Season standings ===
- 6 titles – (4 SG, 2 GS)

Season	Age	Overall	Super-G	Giant slalom	Downhill	Combine
1982	18	71	-	38	-	26
1983	19	38	-	14	31	-
1984	20	28	-	10	-	24
1985	21	58	-	27	-	-
1986	22	40	31	12	28	-
1987	23	60	-	23	-	-
1988	24	19	-	6	24	-
1989	25	4	1	6	4	10
1990	26	5	1	7	10	-
1991	27	5	1	17	4	-
1992	28	2	1	1	8	-
1993	29	3	3	1	7	-
1994	30	20	24	8	53	-

=== Race victories ===
- 22 wins – (12 SG, 10 GS)
- 44 podiums, 88 top tens

Season	Date	Location	Race
1988	6 January 1988	Tignes, France	Giant slalom
1989	26 November 1988	Schladming, Austria	Super-G
1989	14 January 1989	Grindelwald, Switzerland	Super-G
1989	20 January 1989	Tignes, France	Super-G
1990	10 February 1990	Méribel, France	Super-G
1990	11 February 1990	Méribel, France	Super-G
1990	10 March 1990	Stranda, Norway	Giant slalom
1990	14 March 1990	Klövsjö, Sweden	Giant slalom
1990	16 March 1990	Åre, Sweden	Super-G
1991	9 February 1991	Garmisch-Partenkirchen, Germany	Super-G
1991	24 February 1991	Furano, Japan	Super-G
1992	15 December 1991	Santa Caterina, Italy	Super-G
1992	15 January 1992	Hinterstoder, Austria	Giant slalom
1992	20 January 1992	(Italy) Piancavallo, Italie	Giant slalom
1992	27 January 1992	Morzine, France	Giant slalom
1992	15 March 1992	Panorama, Canada	Super-G
1992	19 March 1992	Crans-Montana, Switzerland	Super-G
1992	21 March 1992	Crans-Montana, Switzerland	Giant slalom
1993	5 January 1993	Maribor, Slovenia	Giant slalom
1993	10 January 1993	(Italy) Cortina d'Ampezzo, Italie	Giant slalom
1993	28 February 1993	Veysonnaz, Switzerland	Super-G
1993	27 March 1993	Åre, Sweden	Giant slalom

== See also ==
- List of FIS Alpine Ski World Cup women's race winners
