= Varvara Zelenskaya =

Personal information
- Native name: (Warwara Zelenskaja) (Варвара Зеленская)
- Born: 5 October 1972 (age 53) Petropavlovsk-Kamchatsky, Russian SFSR, Soviet Union
- Height: 1.78 m (5 ft 10 in)

Skiing career
- Sport: Alpine skiing
- Retired: 2002
- Disciplines: DH, SG, GS
- World Cup debut: 18 February 1989

Olympics
- Teams: 4 (1992, 1994, 1998, 2002)
- Medals: 0 (0 gold)

World Championships
- Teams: 5 (1991, 1993, 1996, 1997, 2001)
- Medals: 0 (0 gold)

World Cup
- Seasons: 14
- Wins: 4
- Podiums: 13
- Overall titles: 0
- Discipline titles: 0

Varvara Vladimirovna Zelenskaya (Russian: Варвара Владимировна Зеленская, often transliterated as Warwara Zelenskaja; born 5 October 1972) is a retired Russian alpine ski racer. She is the most successful Russian female World Cup ski racer, winning a total of four races (Svetlana Gladishiva is the only other Russian woman to win a World Cup race).

== Career ==
Zelenskaya began skiing at the age of six in her native Petropavlovsk-Kamchatsky, on the Kamchatka Peninsula in far eastern Russia.

Zelenskaya made her debut on the FIS Alpine Ski World Cup circuit in February 1989 at the age of 16 and competed for 14 seasons through 2002. She won four World Cup races in 1996 and 1997, all in downhill. She also placed on the World Cup podium (top three) in 12 downhill races and one Super G from 1990 to 1997, with her first podium at the age of 18 on 21 December 1990, in Morzine, France. She placed third in the World Cup downhill standings and tenth overall in 1997, her best year on the circuit.

She also competed in four Winter Olympics (1992, 1994, 1998, 2002) and five FIS Alpine World Ski Championships (1991, 1993, 1996, 1997, 2001), representing the Soviet Union (1991), Unified Team (1992), and Russia (subsequently). She placed in the top-ten several times in those competitions, but failed to win any medals.

Zelenskaya retired from top-level competition in April 2002, after the end of the World Cup season and the Russian national championships in which she won the Super G and placed second in the downhill. Following the birth of her daughter in 2003, she returned to limited competition in 2004, winning the downhill and Super G at the Russian national championships that year, and repeating as national champion in Super G again in 2006.

=== World Cup victories ===
| Season | Date | Location | Discipline |
|---|---|---|---|
| 1996 | 1 March 1996 | Narvik, Norway | Downhill |
| 1997 | 1 February 1997 | Laax, Switzerland | Downhill |
| 1997 | 28 February 1997 | Happo One, Japan | Downhill |
| 1997 | 2 March 1997 | Happo One, Japan | Downhill |

== Personal life ==
Zelenskaya married Julien Degeorges, the former physiotherapist of the French women's ski team, in 2001. The official name on her passport has been "Varvara Vladimirovna Degeorges" since their marriage. Their daughter Marta was born in 2003 and their son Anton was born in 2008.
