= Katharina Gutensohn =

Austrian/German alpine skier

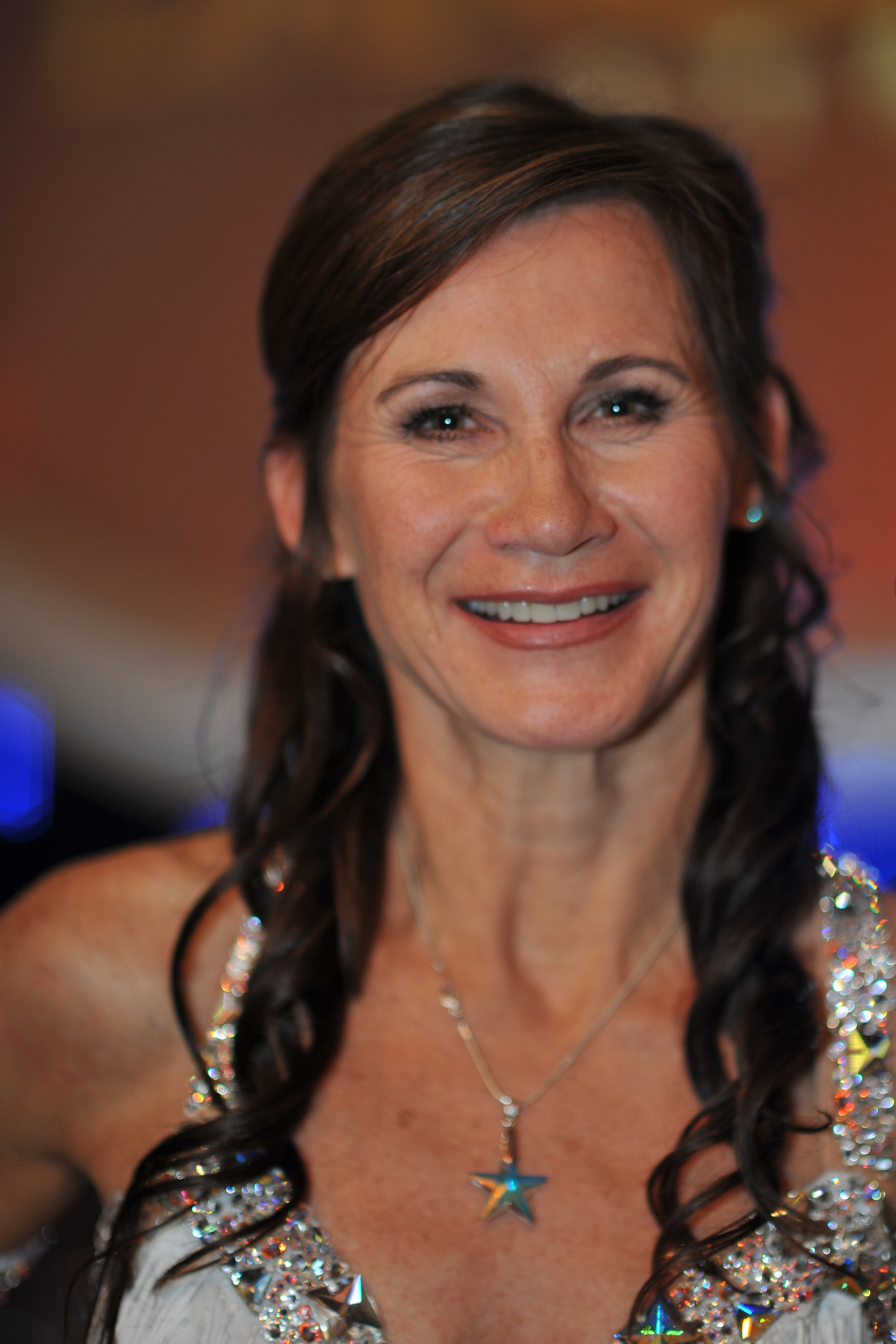

Personal information
- Born: 22 March 1966 (age 60) Kirchberg, Austria

Skiing career
- Sport: Alpine skiing
- Retired: 2010
- Disciplines: Speed events
- World Cup debut: 1983

Olympics
- Teams: 3

World Championships
- Teams: 3
- Medals: 1

World Cup
- Seasons: 16
- Wins: 8
- Podiums: 15
- Discipline titles: 1
Medal record
Women's alpine skiing
Representing Austria
World Cup race podiums
Event	1st	2nd	3rd
Downhill	8	5	3
Super-G	0	0	2
Total	8	5	5
World Championships
Silver medal – second place	1985 Bormio	Downhill

Katharina Gutensohn (born 22 March 1966). Is an Austrian skier. She represented Austria from 1983 to 1988 and Germany from 1989 the end of her alpine skiing career.

== Biography ==
In 2005, at the age of 39, she made a comeback in the new Olympic discipline of ski cross. She won her first World Cup start at Grindelwald on March 5, 2005. She also finished twice on the podium, the latest a second place at St. Johann in Tirol on January 5, 2009.

She competed for Germany in alpine skiing events at the 1992, 1994 and 1998 Winter Olympics and for Austria in skicross at the 2010 Winter Olympics.

Gutensohn took part in the 8th season of the Austrian dance competition TV show Dancing Stars in 2012, finishing in 12th (last) place.

== World Cup victories ==
Date	Location	Race
March 2, 1985	(United States) Vail	Downhill
January 10, 1986	(Austria) Bad Gastein	Downhill
January 16, 1986	(France) Puy St. Vincent	Downhill
February 2, 1986	(Switzerland) Crans-Montana	Downhill
February 3, 1990	(Switzerland) Veysonnaz	Downhill
February 4, 1990	(Switzerland) Veysonnaz	Downhill
December 8, 1990	(Austria) Altenmarkt	Downhill
January 6, 1991	(Austria) Bad Kleinkirchheim	Downhill
March 5, 2005	(Switzerland) Grindelwald	Skicross
