= Eva Twardokens =

American alpine skier (born 1965)

Medal record

Women's alpine skiing

World Championships
Bronze medal – third place	1985 Bormio	Giant slalom

Eva Twardokens (born April 28, 1965) is a retired World Cup alpine ski racer. She made her World Cup debut at age 17 in December 1982.

Twardokens achieved a significant milestone early in her career, winning the bronze medal in the giant slalom at the 1985 World Championships. She went on to represent the U.S. in two Winter Olympics (1992, 1994). On the World Cup circuit, she had three podiums and 34 top ten finishes. She retired from international competition after the 1995 season.

In 2007, Twardokens won the Masters National Weightlifting Champion in the 40-45 age group in the 63 kg (139 lb) class, with a 60 kg (132 lb) snatch and a 79 kg (174 lb) clean and jerk for a 139 kg (306 lb) total.

She was inducted to the US Ski and Snowboard Hall of Fame class of 2011 on April 14, 2012.

Her father, Jerzy Twardokens, was an Olympian who represented Poland in fencing at the 1952 Olympics. He defected to the United States in Philadelphia in 1958. Later, he became a professor at the University of Nevada in Reno.

In February 2019, Twardokens was seriously injured in a private plane crash near Watsonville, California.

== World Cup results ==
=== Season standings ===
Season	Age	Overall	Slalom	Giant Slalom	Super G	Downhill	Combined
1983	17	66	—	—	—	—	24
1984	18	77	—	—	—	—	30
1985	19	16	19	10	—	—	23
1986	20	24	23	25	—	—	—
1987	21	40	23	25	—	—	—
1988	22						
1989	23	80	37	—	—	—	—
1990	24	64	27	39	—	—	—
1991	25	14	17	4	35	—	19
1992	26	16	18	7	21	—	—
1993	27	101	—	40	—	—	—
1994	28	23	37	9	60	—	—
1995	29	38	—	13	34	—	—

=== Race podiums ===
- 3 podiums – (2 GS, 1 SG), 34 top tens

Season	Date	Location	Discipline	Place
1985	26 Jan 1985	Arosa, Switzerland	Super-G	2nd
1991	10 Feb 1991	Zwiesel, Germany	Giant slalom	2nd
1992	20 Jan 1992	Piancavallo, Italy	Giant slalom	3rd

== World Championship results ==
Year	Age	Slalom	Giant Slalom	Super G	Downhill	Combined
1985	19	10	3	—	—	7
1987	21	9	13	14	—	8
1989	23	8	17	—	—	—
1991	25	—	5	—	—	—

== Olympic results ==
Year	Age	Slalom	Giant Slalom	Super G	Downhill	Combined
1992	26	DNF1	7	8	—	—
1994	28	DNF2	6	—	—	—
