= Chantal Bournissen =

Swiss alpine skier (born 1967)

Chantal Bournissen (born 6 April 1967 in Arolla, Valais) is a Swiss former alpine skier. She won the 1991 World Championship in Alpine Combined.
