= Diann Roffe =

American alpine skier

Personal information
- Born: March 24, 1967 (age 59) Warsaw, New York, U.S.
- Height: 5 ft 4 in (163 cm)

Skiing career
- Sport: Alpine skiing
- Retired: April 1994 (age 27)
- Disciplines: Slalom, Giant slalom, Super-G
- World Cup debut: March 7, 1984 (age 16)

Olympics
- Teams: 3 – (1988, 1992, 1994)
- Medals: 2 (1 gold)

World Championships
- Teams: 3 – (1985, 1989, 1993)
- Medals: 1 (0 gold)

World Cup
- Seasons: 10 – (1985–1994)
- Wins: 2 – (1 SG, 1 GS)
- Podiums: 8 – (1 SG, 7 GS)
- Overall titles: 0 – (10th in 1990, 1992)
- Discipline titles: 0 – (3rd in GS, 1992)
Medal record
Women's alpine skiing
Representing the United States
Winter Olympic Games
Gold medal – first place	1994 Lillehammer	Super-G
Silver medal – second place	1992 Albertville	Giant slalom
World Championships
Gold medal – first place	1985 Bormio	Giant slalom
Winter Pan American Games
Gold medal – first place	1990 Las Leñas	Giant slalom

Diann Roffe (born March 24, 1967), also known as Diann Roffe-Steinrotter, is a former World Cup-winning alpine ski racer and Olympic gold medalist from the United States.

== Early life ==
Roffe was born in Warsaw, New York, and learned to ski at Brantling Ski Center near Rochester, New York.

== Career ==
Roffe placed 8th in the FIS Alpine Skiing World Cup giant slalom (GS) race on March 7, 1984, at Lake Placid, and placed 9th in the same discipline on December 15, 1984, at Madonna di Campiglio. She won a gold medal in the GS event at the 1985 World Championships in Bormio, Italy at age 17.

Roffe also won the silver medal (tying with Anita Wachter) in the GS event at the 1992 Winter Olympics in Albertville, France.

Roffe won the Super-G (SG) event at the 1994 Olympics in Lillehammer, Norway. She took first place in the SG event at the 1994 World Cup Finals in Vail, Colorado.

She had season-ending knee injuries in 1986 and 1991.

Roffe was inducted into the National Ski Hall of Fame in 2003.

== World Cup results ==
=== Season standings ===
Season	Age	Overall	Slalom	Giant slalom	Super-G
1984	16	68	—	30	—
1985	17	25	47	9	—
1986	18	—	—	—	—
1987	19	—	—	—	—
1988	20	91	—	29	—
1989	21	66	34	29	—
1990	22	10	20	4	11
1991	23	44	21	24	21
1992	24	10	48	3	6
1993	25	42	43	19	19
1994	26	39	—	30	13

=== Race podiums ===
- 2 wins – (1 SG, 1 GS)
- 8 podiums – (1 SG, 7 GS)

Season	Date	Location	Race	Place
1985	Mar 13, 1985	Lake Placid, US	Giant slalom	1st
1985	Mar 17, 1985	Waterville Valley, US	Giant slalom	2nd
1990	Nov 24, 1989	Park City, US	Giant slalom	2nd
1990	Dec 3, 1989	Vail, US	Giant slalom	2nd
1990	Feb 5, 1990	Veysonnaz, Switzerland	Giant slalom	3rd
1992	Dec 8, 1991	Santa Caterina, Italy	Giant slalom	3rd
1992	Jan 27, 1992	Morzine, France	Giant slalom	3rd
1994	Mar 17, 1994	Vail, US	Super-G	1st
