= Florence Masnada =

French alpine skier (born 1968)

Medal record

Women's alpine skiing

Olympic Games
Bronze medal – third place	1992 Albertville	Combined
Bronze medal – third place	1998 Nagano	Downhill

World Championships
Bronze medal – third place	1999 Vail	Combined

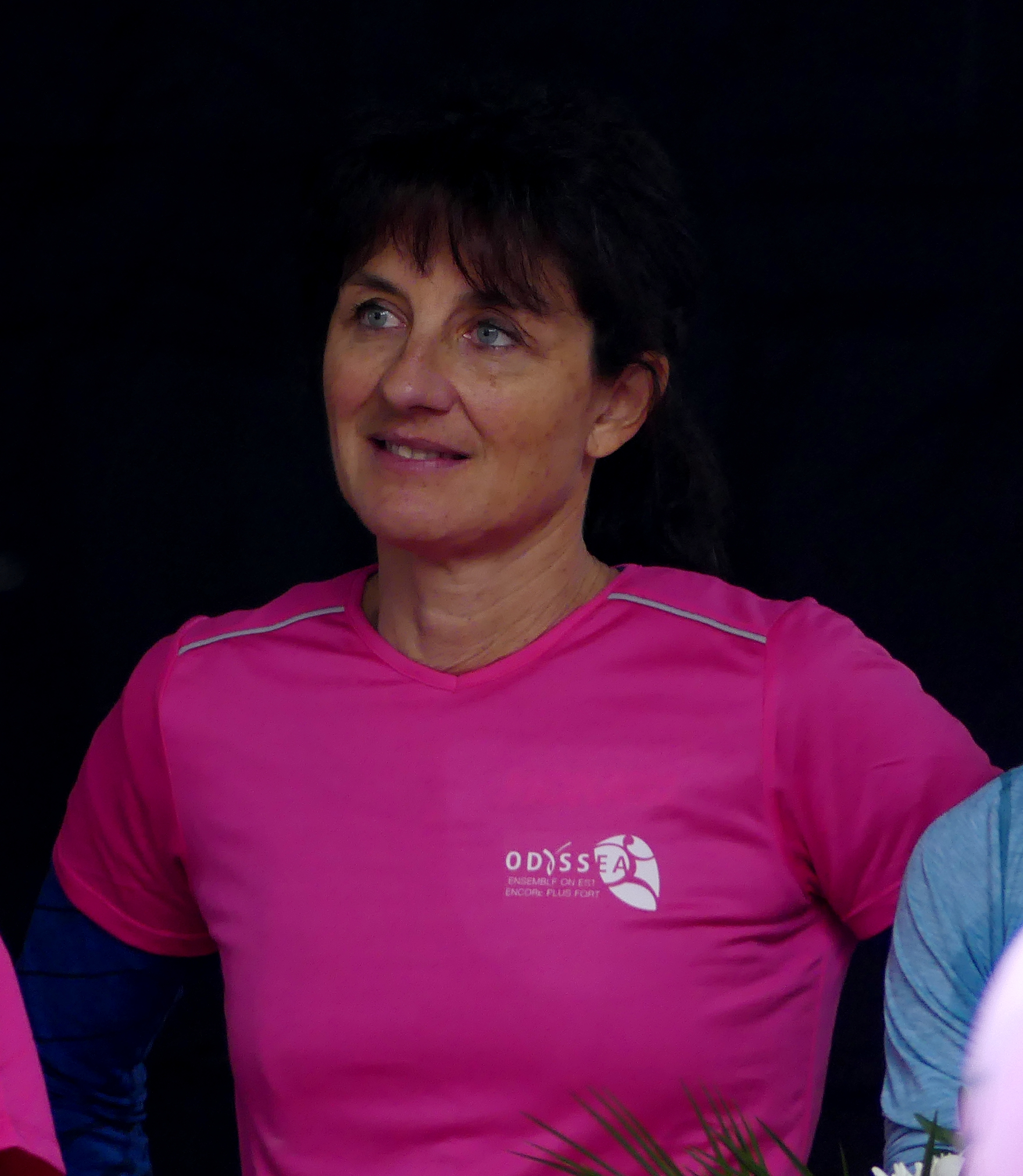

Florence Masnada (born 16 December 1968 in Vizille) is a retired French alpine skier, who won two bronze Olympic medals.

== World Cup victories ==
Date	Location	Race
14 January 1995	(Germany) Garmisch	Super-G
