= Karin Dedler =

German alpine skier (born 1963)

Medal record

Women's alpine skiing

World Championships
Bronze medal – third place	1989 Vail	Downhill

Karin Dedler (born February 2, 1963, in Dietmannsried) is a retired German alpine skier. She won a bronze medal for downhill skiing in the 1989 world championships of skiing. She competed in the women's combined at the 1988 Winter Olympics.
