= Heidi Zurbriggen =

Swiss alpine skier (born 1967)

Medal record

Women's Alpine Skiing

Representing Switzerland

Alpine World Championships
Silver medal – second place	1996 Sierra Nevada	Super-G
Silver medal – second place	1997 Sestriere	Downhill

Heidi Andenmatten-Zurbriggen (born 16 March 1967 in Saas-Almagell, Kanton Wallis) is a Swiss former alpine skier. She is the sister of Pirmin Zurbriggen, an aunt of Elia Zurbriggen and cousin of Silvan Zurbriggen. She won 3 Downhill races on the World Cup tour. She competed at the 1992, 1994 and the 1998 Winter Olympics.

She now operates Chalet Rustica with her husband Damian Andenmatten in Saas-Almagell.

== World Cup victories ==
=== Downhill ===
Date	Location
6 March 1996	(Norway) Kvitfjell
11 January 1997	(Austria) Bad Kleinkirchheim
24 January 1997	(Italy) Cortina d'Ampezzo
