= Sabine Ginther =

Austrian alpine skier

Personal information
- Born: 3 February 1970 (age 56) Ehenbichl, Austria

Skiing career
- Sport: Alpine skiing
- Retired: 1993
- Disciplines: Polyvalent
- World Cup debut: 1988

World Championships
- Teams: 1

World Cup
- Seasons: 5
- Wins: 6
- Podiums: 14
Medal record
World Cup race podiums
Event	1st	2nd	3rd
Slalom	1	0	0
Downhill	3	2	2
Super-G	0	0	1
Combined	2	1	2
Total	6	3	5
International alpine ski competitions
Event	1st	2nd	3rd
Junior World Championships	6	2	0

Sabine Ginther (born 3 February 1970) is a retired Austrian alpine skier.

== Career ==
In her short career in the World Cup, which lasted just 5 seasons, she achieved 14 podiums (6 wins). She has also won a Europa Cup and 8 medals (6 gold) at the Junior World Championships.

== Europa Cup results ==
She has won an overall Europa Cup and one specialty standings.

- FIS Alpine Ski Europa Cup
  - Overall: 1989
  - Downhill: 1989
