= Stefanie Schuster =

Austrian alpine skier (born 1969)

Stefanie Schuster (born 19 April 1969 in Oberstdorf) is an Austrian former alpine skier who competed in the 1994 Winter Olympics and 1998 Winter Olympics.
