= Michaela Gerg-Leitner =

German alpine skier (born 1965)

Medal record

Women's alpine skiing

Representing West Germany

World Championships
Bronze medal – third place	1989 Vail / Beaver Creek	Super-G

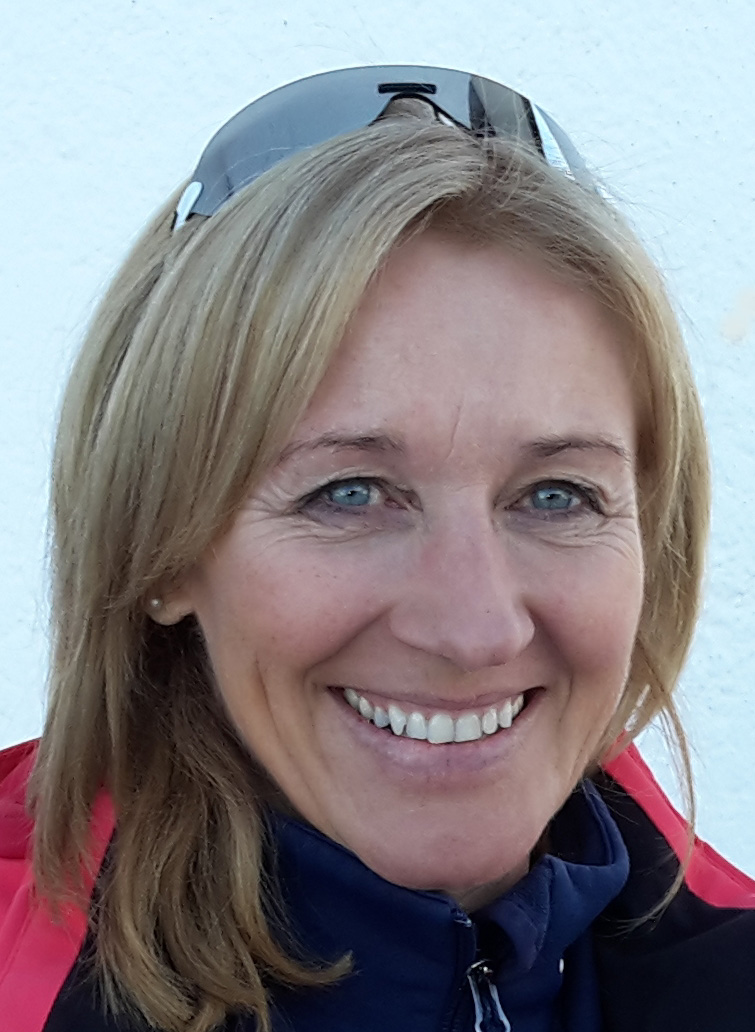
Michaela Gerg in 2016

Michaela Gerg-Leitner (born November 10, 1965, in Lenggries) is a retired German alpine skier.

== World Cup victories ==
Date	Location	Race
December 12, 1985	(France) Val d'Isère	Downhill
November 29, 1986	(United States) Park City	Giant Slalom
August 8, 1989	(Argentina) Las Leñas	Downhill
January 20, 1995	(Italy) Cortina d'Ampezzo	Downhill
