= Petra Kronberger =

Austrian alpine skier (born 1969)

Personal information
- Born: 21 February 1969 (age 57) St. Johann im Pongau, Austria
- Height: 1.74 m (5 ft 9 in)

Skiing career
- Sport: Alpine skiing
- Club: SC Werfenweng
- Retired: 28 December 1992 (age 23)
- Disciplines: Slalom, giant slalom, super-G, Downhill, combined
- World Cup debut: 20 March 1987 (age 18)

Olympics
- Teams: 2 – (1988, 1992)
- Medals: 2 (2 gold)

World Championships
- Teams: 2 – (1989, 1991)
- Medals: 1 (1 gold)

World Cup
- Seasons: 6 – (1988–1993)
- Wins: 16
- Podiums: 35
- Overall titles: 3 – (1990, 1991, 1992)
- Discipline titles: 1 – (SL: 1991)
Medal record
Women's alpine skiing
Representing Austria
World Cup race podiums
Event	1st	2nd	3rd
Slalom	3	1	4
Giant slalom	3	0	1
Downhill	6	2	2
Super-G	2	3	3
Combined	2	1	2
Total	16	7	12
International competitions
Event	1st	2nd	3rd
Olympic Games	2	0	0
World Championships	1	0	0
Junior World Championships	0	1	0
Total	3	1	0
Olympic Games
Gold medal – first place	1992 Albertville	Slalom
Gold medal – first place	1992 Albertville	Alpine combined
World Championships
Gold medal – first place	1991 Saalbach	Downhill
Junior World Ski Championships
Silver medal – second place	1987 Hemsedal	Giant slalom

Petra Kronberger (born 21 February 1969) is an Austrian former alpine skier, who participated in all disciplines. She was the first female alpine skier to win in all five World Cup events.

== Career ==
Kronberger entered the World Cup circuit in the 1987/88 season. She gained several podiums and was expected to be a strong competitor at the 1988 Winter Olympic Games in Calgary. She did not win any medals there, but she did give a good performance for an athlete still in her teen years: she finished sixth in the downhill and eleventh in the combined.

Kronberger only won her first World Cup events, two downhill races, in December 1989, but by the end of that season, she had captured the World Cup overall title. This made her an instant hero in Austria: ever since that country's skiing star of the 1970s, Annemarie Pröll (later Moser-Pröll) had retired, the Swiss team had almost completely dominated the alpine world, which had long rankled the Austrian fans.

She successfully defended her World Cup overall champion title twice. Over the course of thirty-eight days in December 1990 and January 1991, Kronberger became the first skier in the modern era to win one race in each of the five alpine events in one season. Four of those wins in all but the combined came in the month of December alone, another notable feat.

At the 1991 World Championships she won a gold medal in her first event, the downhill, and was suspected to be able to win four more medals. However, she fell in her second event, the Super-G, and injured her right knee, forcing her to miss the rest of the races. (Despite her fall, she still finished sixth in that event.)

Her performances at the 1992 Winter Olympic Games in Albertville, France, were even better. She won two gold medals, one in the slalom and one in the combined, and finished a respectable fourth (with only 0.01 sec. behind the podium) the Super-G, and fifth in the downhill.

Her decision to retire from competitive skiing on 25 December 1992 due to loss of motivation to compete any further came as a big surprise to the skiing community..

== After career ==
Kronberger did catch up on her matriculation, did start studies in German philology and history of art at the university in the borough of Salzburg, did act as an assistant at a university. In later time she lived in Berlin and Hamburg. After dissolution she returned to the borough of Salzburg. She did work in adult vocational training and was an art guide in the "Salzburg Museum" (museum in Salzburg) and "Festung Hohensalzburg" ("Hohensalzburg Castle"), and she was a member of the Organizing Committee of the FIS Alpine Skiing World Championships 2013 at Schladming. She also is a singer in the "Salzburger Domchor" (cathedral choir at Salzburg) and the "KlangsCala" (a famous chamber choir in Salzburg). Since November 2015 she is employed at the Austrian Skiing Federation, and since 16 January 2016 she is a "Frauenbeauftragte" (maybe translated as commissioner for women's affairs) there (cit. the German Wikipedia).

== World Cup victories ==
=== Overall ===
Season	Discipline
1990	Overall
1991	Overall
1991	Slalom
1992	Overall

=== Individual races ===
Date	Location	Race
16 December 1989	(Canada) Panorama	Downhill
17 December 1989	(Canada) Panorama	Downhill
8 January 1990	(Austria) Hinterstoder	Giant slalom
14 January 1990	(Austria) Haus im Ennstal	Combined
28 January 1990	(Italy) Santa Caterina	Giant slalom
13 March 1990	(Sweden) Vemdalen	Slalom
1 December 1990	(Italy) Val Zoldana	Giant slalom
2 December 1990	(Italy) Val Zoldana	Slalom
9 December 1990	(Austria) Altenmarkt-Zauchensee	Super-G
21 December 1990	(France) Morzine	Downhill
7 January 1991	(Austria) Bad Kleinkirchheim	Combined
13 January 1991	(Slovenia) Kranjska Gora	Slalom
18 January 1991	(France) Méribel	Downhill
19 January 1991	(France) Méribel	Super-G
21 December 1991	(France) Serre Chevalier	Downhill
14 March 1992	(Canada) Panorama	Downhill

Awards
Preceded by Ulrike Maier	Austrian Sportswoman of the year 1990 – 1992	Succeeded by Anita Wachter
