= La Hoya, Chubut =

Mountain in Argentina

La Hoya
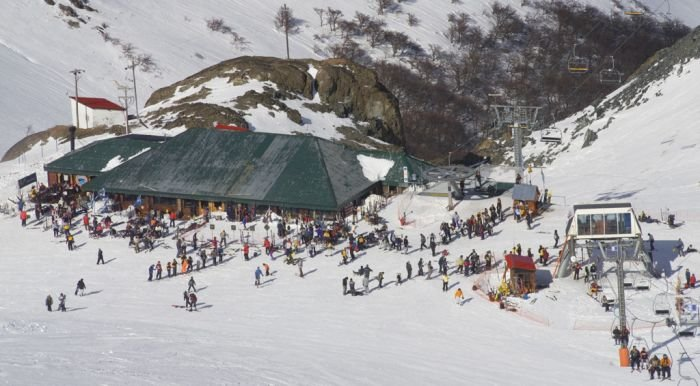
- Interactive map of La Hoya
- Location: Chubut Province, Argentina
- Nearest city: Esquel, 13 kilometres (8.1 mi)
- Coordinates: 42°50′S 71°15′W
- Vertical: 850 metres (2,790 ft)
- Trails: 24; Green - 3 Blue - 8 Red - 8 Black - 5
- Longest run: 5.1 kilometres (3.2 mi)
- Lift system: 4 Chairlifts; 5 T-bar lifts
- Website: skihoya.com

La Hoya (Argentina) is a ski resort in Chubut Province, Patagonia, southern Argentina.

Due to its southward orientation, the slope doesn't receive much sunshine, so the proper conditions are created for the formation of the powder snow which characterizes this resort and makes it popular.

As its name suggests (hoyo is the Spanish for hole), the skiing area has the shape of a hole or amphitheater, with its back to the trajectory of the Sun. This is the reason why the snow typically endures until October, when winter sports can be played with less clothes on. There are runs for all skills of Alpine Ski, including competition. The resort offers as well an area for ski touring and a snowpark.

== History ==
Not unlike other ski centers around the World, La Hoya started (towards the 1930s) as a snow area close to a town, used by some neighbors for recreation. At the time, La Hoya was reached from Esquel by horse.

In the early 1940s, the Mountain Regiment Nº40 of the Argentine Army, based in Esquel, constructed shelters and opened trekking paths for their own military activities. More than ten years later, the Argentine Army ended all activities in the area and transferred their shelters to the Club Andino Esquel (CAE, founded on 1 November 1952), laying the foundations of the practice of Winter Sports in the region.

In the mid-1950s, the works were started for opening a car road between Esquel and the newly-forming ski center. The works were carried out by a consortium constituted by the highway administration of Chubut (that had recently been promoted from territory to province), the town council of Esquel, the chamber of commerce of Esquel, and the Club Andino Esquel (CAE), with the aid of an important number of residents. The road was inaugurated after two years, and afterwards the CAE engaged in fitting-out and harmonization of the trails, while the Government of the Province of Chubut took on responsibility for developing the resort by means of its provincial Dirección de Turismo (Department of Tourism or Tourism Authority). In a joint effort, the CAE and the Government of Chubut carried out the surveys and the drafts for the first ski lifts and the first additional buildings.

== See also ==
- Cerro Castor
- Chapelco
- Las Leñas
- Cerro Catedral
- List of ski areas and resorts in South America
