= Los Penitentes (Argentina) =

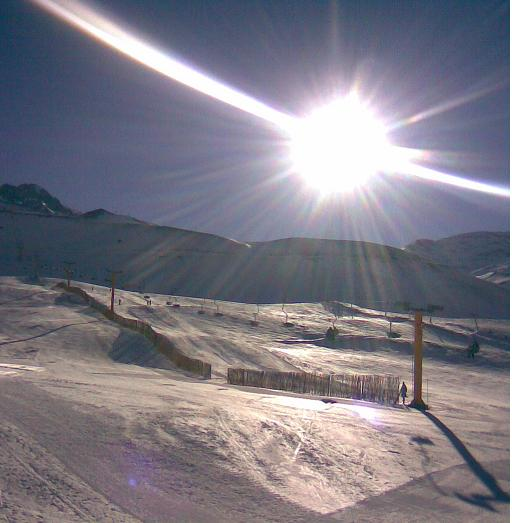
- A typical sunny day in Los Penitentes
- Interactive map of Los Penitentes
- Location: Mendoza, Cuyo, Argentina
- Coordinates: 32.841624°S 69.837752°W
- Skiable area: 300 hectares (740 acres)
- Trails: 25
- Longest run: 7 kilometres (4.3 mi)
- Lift system: 2 Chairlifts; 1T-bar lifts 4 Ski tows 1 Conveyor belts

Los Penitentes is a ski resort in Mendoza, Argentina about 25 km off Paso de Libertadores, which marks the border between Argentina and Chile, and 180 km from Mendoza Capital City, at the foot of Mount Aconcagua on Ruta 7.

== Etymology ==
The name Los Penitentes (The Penitents, in English) comes from the curious forms the ice on the mountain sides, which remind the viewers of "penitents" climbing the mountains or praying on their knees.

== History ==
In 1978, Emilio López Frugoni, a ski lover from Mendoza, bought 51 hectares of land and started a project to build a ski centre next to Mendoza City. The ski resort was inaugurated in 1979. Today the ski runs (25 in total) cover a surface of about 300 hectares, for all-level skiers and with ski lifts to reach different levels and runs. About 1950 people can be accommodated in Los Penitentes since there is a variety of facilities provided, such as apartments, apart hotels, and hostels.

== Weather ==
In winter, the average temperature is about 1 °C, ranging between -4° and 7 °C. The weather is dry and sunny on most days.

== Activities ==
This centre has 25 runs of different lengths and drops for beginner, advanced and expert skiers. The season ranges from mid-June to late August. The activities that can be carried out there include ski, snowboarding, and heli-skiing. There are also a number of services available, such as a ski school, snow garden, shopping center, restaurants, hostels, hotels, kindergarten, and disco.

== See also ==
- Cerro Castor
- Chapelco
- Las Leñas
- Cerro Catedral
- List of ski areas and resorts in South America
