= Cerro Bayo =

Mountain

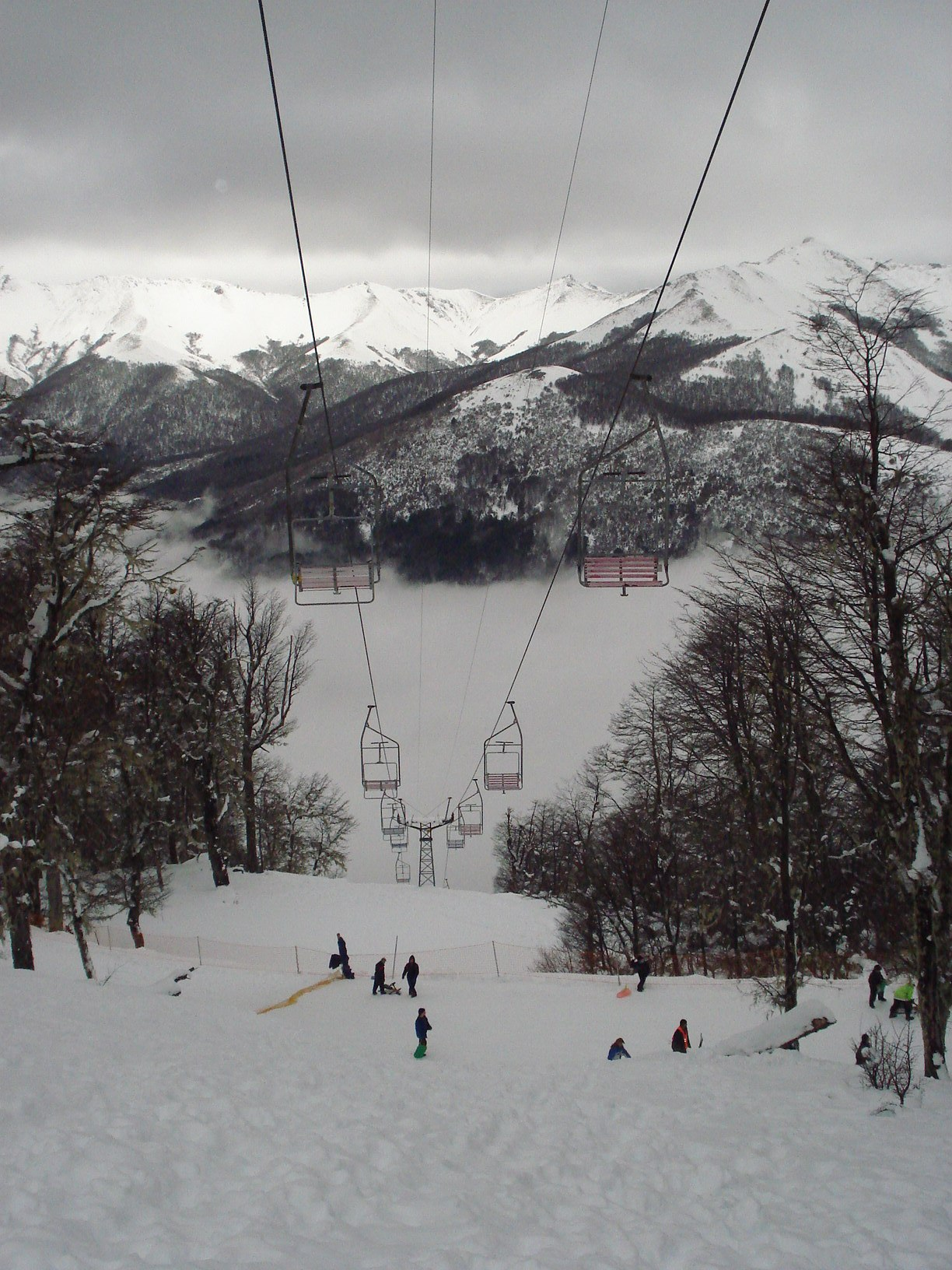
- View of the Nahuel Huapi Lake from the summit of the Cerro Bayo
- Interactive map of Cerro Bayo
- Location: Neuquen, Patagonia, Argentina
- Nearest city: Villa La Angostura, 9 kilometres (5.6 mi)
- Top elevation: 1782
- Trails: 25 – 14 kilometres (8.7 mi); Green – 3 Blue – 7 Red – 9 Black – 6
- Longest run: 6 km (3.7 mi)
- Lift system: 2 Gondola lift 6 Chairlifts; 2 T-bar lifts 3 Magic carpets 1 Ski tows 2 Conveyor belts
- Lift capacity: 6,890 /hour
- Website: Cerro Bayo

Cerro Bayo is a mountain of the Andes range located 9 km from the town Villa La Angostura, Neuquén Province, Argentina, within the Valdivian temperate rain forests, in an area with numerous lakes. The mountain hosts a ski area with 25 runs and 16 lifts. In 2007, the 2nd South American Ski Mountaineering Championship was carried out on the Cerro Bayo.

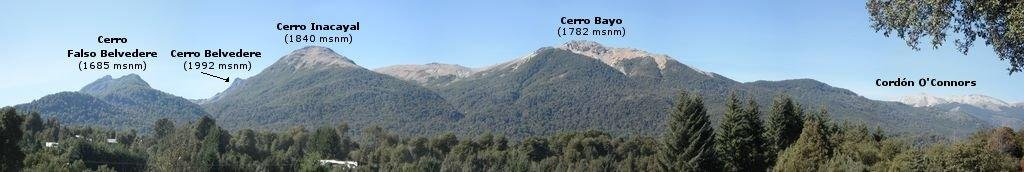

== See also ==
- Cerro Castor
- Cerro Catedral
- Chapelco
- Las Leñas
- List of ski areas and resorts in South America
