= Nieto =

Nieto (“grandchild”) is a Spanish surname, Neto is the Portuguese version of the name. Notable people with the surname include:

- Alfonso Nieto (born 1991), Mexican footballer
- Alfonso Nieto Castañón (born 1972), Spanish neuroscientist
- Alfredo Diez Nieto (1918-2021), Cuban composer and centenarians
- Amalia Nieto (1907–2003), Uruguayan painter, sculptor, and engraver
- Ángel Nieto (1947–2017), Spanish motorcycle racer
- Antonio Jesús López Nieto (born 1958), Spanish football referee
- Carlos Nieto (disambiguation), multiple people of the same name
  - Carlos Nieto (rugby union) (born 1976), Italian rugby union player
  - Carlos Nieto (footballer) (born 1996), Spanish footballer
- Claudio Nieto Jiménez (born 1977), Chilean ski mountaineer and triathlete
- Daniel Nieto Vela, (born 1991), Spanish footballer
- David Nieto (1654–1728), Jewish Hakham in London
- Domingo Nieto (1803–1844), President of Peru
- Enrique Peña Nieto (born 1966), President of Mexico
- Enrique Nieto (architect) (1880 or 1883–1954), Spanish architect
- Ernesto Nieto (born 1940), founder of the National Hispanic Institute
- Federico Nieto (born 1983), Argentine footballer
- Fonsi Nieto (born 1978), Spanish motorcycle racer
- Jamie Nieto (born 1976), American high jumper
- Jan Nieto (born 1981), Filipino singer
- José Nieto (composer) (born 1942), Spanish musician and composer
- José Javier Palomo Nieto, Salvadoran politician
- Juan José Nieto Gil, (1805–1866), 61st president of Colombia
- John Marvin Nieto (born 1977), Filipino actor and politician better known by his screen name Yul Servo
- Johnielle Keith "Kit" Nieto (born 1969), Filipino lawyer and politician
- Manuel Nieto (1734–1804), soldier in Spanish California
- María Nieto (born 1999), Spanish karateka
- Matt Nieto (born 1992), American ice hockey player
- Miguel Ángel Nieto (born 1986), Spanish soccer player
- Pablo Nieto (born 1980), Spanish motorcycle racer
- Rafael Nieto Navia (1938–2024), Colombian jurist and political scientist
- Rey Joseph "RJ" Nieto (born 1985), Filipino blogger and opinion columnist also known as Thinking Pinoy
- Rodolfo Nieto (1936–1985), Mexican painter
- Santiago Nieto (born 1973), Mexican politician
- Tom Nieto (born 1960), American baseball player and manager
- Victor Nieto (1916–2008), founder and director of the Cartagena Film Festival
