= Caviahue =

Mountain in Argentina

- Interactive map of Caviahue
- Location: Neuquén Province, Argentina
- Coordinates: 37°52′S 71°05′W
- Vertical: 1,308 metres (4,291 ft)
- Trails: 21; Green - 7 Blue - 8 Red - 6
- Lift system: 4 Chairlifts; 5 T-bar lifts 2 Small lifts
- Website: Municipality of Caviahue-Copahue

Caviahue is a ski resort and a village in the municipality of Caviahue-Copahue, Neuquén Province, Patagonia, Argentina. The ski trails are located on the eastern slope of Mount Caviahue, and the base is two km west of the village and just four km east of the limit between Argentina and Chile. The village lies on the shores of Lake Agrio (also known as Lake Caviahue), and the landscape is characterized by Araucaria forests, typical of the region.

The First Argentine Winter Games were celebrated in 2016 in Caviahue.

== Ski resort ==
Caviahue's ski resort has 23 trails, connected by four chairlifts, five T-bars, and two small lifts. Besides alpine skiing, the center offers snowboarding, snowmobiles, snowshoe trekking and cross-country skiing. There are also two kennels offering dogsleds.

== See also ==
- Cerro Castor
- Chapelco
- Las Leñas
- Cerro Catedral
- List of ski areas and resorts in South America
