= 1990 Winter Pan American Games medal table =

The 1990 Winter Pan American Games, officially known as the I Winter Pan American Games, were a continental winter multi-sport event held in Las Leñas, Argentina, from September 16 to September 22, 1990. At the only Winter Games realized, 97 athletes selected from 8 National Olympic Committees (NOCs) participated in events in 1 sport: alpine skiing. Only Canada and the United States earned medals during the competition.

== Medal table ==
The ranking in this table is based on medal counts published by several media organizations. By default, the table is ordered by the number of gold medals won by the athletes representing a nation. (In this context, a nation is an entity represented by a NOC). The number of silver medals is taken into consideration next and then the number of bronze medals. If nations are still tied, equal ranking is given and they are listed alphabetically by IOC country code.

To sort this table by nation, total medal count, or any other column, click on the icon next to the column title.

Rank	Nation	Gold	Silver	Bronze	Total
1	United States	4	2	5	11
2	Canada	2	4	1	7
Totals (2 entries)		6	6	6	18
