= CVH =

Chris Van Hollen (born 1959), the senior United States senator from Maryland since 2017.

CVH may also refer to:

- Ford CVH engine, an engine used in Ford vehicles from 1980 to 2004
- CVH, IATA airport code of Caviahue Airport (Argentina)
- Credit Valley Hospital, a regional hospital located in Mississauga, Ontario
- Connecticut Valley Hospital, a psychiatric hospital in Middletown, Connecticut
- Common variable immunodeficiency, also known by the older name of common variable hypogammaglobulinemia (CVH)
- "Classic Van Halen", the iteration of the American rock band fronted by original lead vocalist David Lee Roth
