= 2007 South American Ski Mountaineering Championship =

The 2007 South American Ski Mountaineering Championship (Spanish: Campeonato Sudamericano de Esquí de Montaña) was the second edition of a South American continental championship of competition ski mountaineering,

The event was sanctioned by the International Council for Ski Mountaineering Competitions (ISMC) and organized by the Federación Chilena de Andinismo (FEACH). The event was held in Termas de Chillán from 22 to 23 September 2007. Sixty-two racers participated in the event; 28 came from Argentina and two from Venezuela.

== Results ==
Event was held on the Cerro Bayo on September 23, 2007.

The male youth class competitors had to run the same course as the senior racers. The results were added in the "International Open" ranking. (italic in the men's ranking list below)

List of the best 10 participants by gender:

=== Women ===
ranking	participant	total time
	(Argentina) Carolina Barbagallo	03h 31' 23"
	(Argentina) Macarena Arrieta	03h 45' 45"
––––	(Chile) Carolina Palma	not finished
––––	(Chile) Johanna Bosshard	disqualified

=== Men ===
South American championship ranking	participant	total time	Intern. Open ranking
	(Argentina) Leonardo Proverbio	02h 08' 46"	
	(Chile) Claudio Nieto	02h 31' 30	
	(Argentina) Carlos Cabezas	02h 33' 35"	
^{*)}	(Argentina) Alan Schwer	02h 37' 24"	4
4	(Argentina) Raúl Aguilar	02h 45' 50"	5
5	(Chile) Orwill Scheuch	02h 48' 15"	6
6	(Chile) Mario Sepúlveda	02h 54' 46"	7
^{*)}	(Chile) Carlos Cruz	03h 01' 21"	8
7	(Argentina) Gabriel Goin	03h 08' 42"	9
^{*)}	(Chile) Federico Scheuch	03h 11' 07"	10
8	(Chile) Rodrigo Vera	03h 11' 12"	11
9	(Chile) Marcos Parra	03h 18' 28"	12
10	(Argentina) Julián López	03h 20' 44	13

^{*)} youth class competitor
