= Nevados de Chillán (ski resort) =

Coordinates: 36.904°S 71.410°W

- Panoramic view of the Nevados de Chillán ski resort
- Location: Pinto, Ñuble Region, Chile
- Nearest city: Chillán
- Vertical: 1,000 m (3,281 ft)
- Top elevation: 2,500 m (8,202 ft) AMSL
- Base elevation: 1,500 m (4,921 ft)
- Skiable area: 10,000 hectares (24,711 acres)
- Trails: 23
- Longest run: Las Tres Marías (13 kilometres (8 mi))
- Lift system: 17 installations (chairlifts, surface lifts, and carpets)
- Snowmaking: Y
- Website: nevadosdechillan.com

Nevados de Chillán is a Chilean ski resort located on the slopes of the Nevados de Chillán volcano complex in the Pinto municipality, Ñuble Region. Formerly known as Termas de Chillán, it is operated under a municipal concession granted by the Municipality of Chillán.

== History ==
The area originally gained popularity for its thermal mineral springs (Termas de Chillán). Between 1911 and 1957, visitors reached the hot springs via the narrow-gauge Tren Chico railway before modern roads and ski infrastructure were built. The resort was later rebranded from Termas de Chillán to Nevados de Chillán to emphasize its mountain sports and winter tourism offerings.

== Description ==
The resort domain spans 10,000 hectares (25,000 acres) with 500 hectares of worked terrain. It features 23 named pistes and 17 lift installations serving a vertical drop of up to 1,000 metres (3,281 ft) between its lower base at 1,500 m and upper volcanic slopes at 2,500 m.

The skiing domain is organized across three primary base sectors:

- Plaza Tata (1,500 m): The lower valley base, dedicated to beginner runs and learning areas.
- Plaza Willy (1,700 m): The central mid-mountain hub with intermediate slopes and main chairlift connections.
- Torre 25 (2,500 m): The upper sector giving access to open volcanic fields, forest runs, and the start of the Tres Marías descent.

The resort features "Las Tres Marías", recognized as the longest ski run in South America at 13 kilometres (8 mi) in length.

== Activities ==
In addition to alpine skiing and snowboarding, the resort offers Nordic skiing, ski touring, heliskiing, snowmobiling, sledding, thermal baths, hiking, mountaineering, and mountain biking during the summer season.

== See also ==
- List of ski areas and resorts in South America
- Termas de Chillán
