= Caviahue Airport =

Caviahue Airport Aeródromo Caviahue
- IATA: ---; ICAO: ----

Summary
- Airport type: Private - Restricted
- Serves: Caviahue
- Location: Argentina
- Elevation AMSL: 5,446 ft / 1,660 m
- Coordinates: 37°51′4.6″S 071°0′34.1″W

Map
- Location of Caviahue Airstrip in Argentina

Runways
Direction	Length		Surface
Direction	ft	m	Surface
04/22	5,250	1,600	Asphalt

Caviahue Airport (Spanish: Aeródromo Caviahue) is a private use airstrip located 6 kilometres (4 mi) east-northeast of Caviahue, Neuquén, Argentina. It was a public airport until the 1990s, when it was abandoned. Its IATA (CVH), ICAO (SAHE) and local (CAV) codes were dropped. The runway is now in poor condition and the airport is for private use only.

== See also ==
- List of airports in Argentina
