= List of ski areas and resorts in South America =

Occurrence of snowfall: All elevations All elevations, not in all areas Higher elevations (mainly above 500 meters above sea level), below rarely Higher elevations (above 500 meters) only Very high elevations (such as above 2,000 meters) only None at any elevation

This is a list of ski areas and resorts in South America.

== Argentina ==
=== Mendoza ===
- Los Penitentes, Las Cuevas
- Los Puquios, Puente del Inca, Departamento Las Heras
- Las Leñas, Malargüe

=== Neuquén ===
- Caviahue, Caviahue-Copahue
- Primeros Pinos, Picunches
- Batea Mahuida, Villa Pehuenia
- Chapelco, San Martín de los Andes
- Cerro Bayo, Villa La Angostura
- Lago Hermoso Ski & Resort

=== Río Negro ===
- Cerro Catedral, Bariloche
- Cerro Otto, Bariloche
- Bagualas, Bariloche
- Laderas, El Bolsón

=== Chubut ===
- La Hoya, Esquel

=== Santa Cruz ===
- Valdelen, Río Turbio

=== Tierra del Fuego Province ===
- Glaciar Martial, Ushuaia
- Cerro Castor, Ushuaia

== Bolivia ==
- Chacaltaya (occasionally operational)

== Brazil ==
- Ski Mountain Park (artificial)
- Snowland Gramado (indoor)

== Chile ==
=== Valparaíso Region ===
- Portillo, Los Andes
- Ski Arpa, San Esteban

=== Metropolitan Region ===
- La Parva, Lo Barnechea
- El Colorado, Lo Barnechea
- Farellones, Lo Barnechea
- Valle Nevado, Lo Barnechea
- Lagunillas, San José de Maipo

=== O'Higgins Region ===
- Chapa Verde, Machalí

=== Ñuble Region ===
- Nevados de Chillán, Pinto

=== Bío-Bío Region ===
- Volcán Antuco, Antuco

=== Araucanía Region ===
- Corralco, Curacautín
- Los Arenales, Curacautín (closed)
- Las Araucarias, Temuco
- Ski Pucón, Pucón

=== Los Ríos Region ===
- Bosque Nevado, Huilo-Huilo, Panguipulli (permanently closed)

=== Los Lagos Region ===
- Antillanca, Puyehue
- Volcán Osorno, Puerto Varas

=== Aysén Region ===
- El Fraile, Coyhaique

=== Magallanes Region ===
- Cerro Mirador, Punta Arenas

== Venezuela ==
- Pico Espejo (defunct)
