= Piscis Hotel (Las Leñas) =

Coordinates: 35.1479°S 70.0817°W

Piscis Hotel is a hotel located at the Las Leñas ski resort in Mendoza, Argentina.

== Casino Las Leñas ==
It currently houses the Casino Las Leñas, the highest casino by elevation in the world.
