= Carlos Nieto =

Carlos Nieto may refer to:

- Carlos Nieto (rugby union) (born 1976), Italian rugby union player
- Carlos Nieto (footballer) (born 1996), Spanish footballer
- Carlos Nieto (actor) (born 1939), actor in El mundo de los vampiros
- Carlos Nieto (sound engineer) (fl. 2000), engineer on Tu Veneno
- Carlos Nieto (Third Watch character)
