= 1990 Winter Pan American Games =

Winter Pan American Games

I Winter Pan American Games
- Host: Las Leñas, Argentina
- Nations: 8
- Athletes: 97
- Events: 6 in 1 sport
- Opening: 16 September
- Closing: 22 September
- Opened by: Governor José Octavio Bordón
- Main venue: Las Leñas

Summer

The 1990 Winter Pan American Games, officially known as the I Winter Pan American Games (Spanish: I Juegos Panamericanos de Invierno) and commonly known as Las Leñas 1990, were held in Las Leñas, Argentina, from 16 September to 22 September 1990. They were the only Winter Pan American Games. 97 athletes from eight countries participated in one sport (alpine skiing).

== Sport ==
- Alpine skiing
  - Slalom skiing
  - Giant slalom
  - Super-G

== Venue ==
All sporting events took place at the Las Leñas ski resort in Mendoza Province.

== Game highlights ==
In 1988, members of PASO voted to hold the first Pan American Winter Games at Las Leñas, Argentina in September 1989. It was further agreed that Winter Games would be held every four years. Lack of snow however, forced the postponement of the games until 16–22 September 1990 when only eight countries sent 97 athletes to Las Leñas. Of that total, 76 were from just three countries: Argentina, Canada, and the United States.

On September 16, Néstor Lowel, president of Las Leñas received the Olympic Flag from Antonio Rodríguez, then president of the Argentine Olympic Committee. Aristeo Benavídez, alpine skier that represented Argentina at the 1952 Winter Olympics, lit the Olympic cauldron after Governor José Octavio Bordón declared the games officially opened. The skier Carolina Eiras, who had represented Argentina at the 1988 Winter Olympics and would be the flag bearer in 1992, made the Olympic Oath.

Weather was unseasonably warm and again there was little snow, so only three Alpine skiing events – the slalom, giant slalom, and Super G were staged. The United States and Canada won all 18 medals.

PASO awarded the second Pan American Winter Games to Santiago, Chile for 1993. The United States warned that it would not take part unless a full schedule of events was held. The Santiago organizing committee eventually gave up on planning the Games after the United States Olympic Committee declined to participate, and the idea has not been revived since.

== Participating teams ==
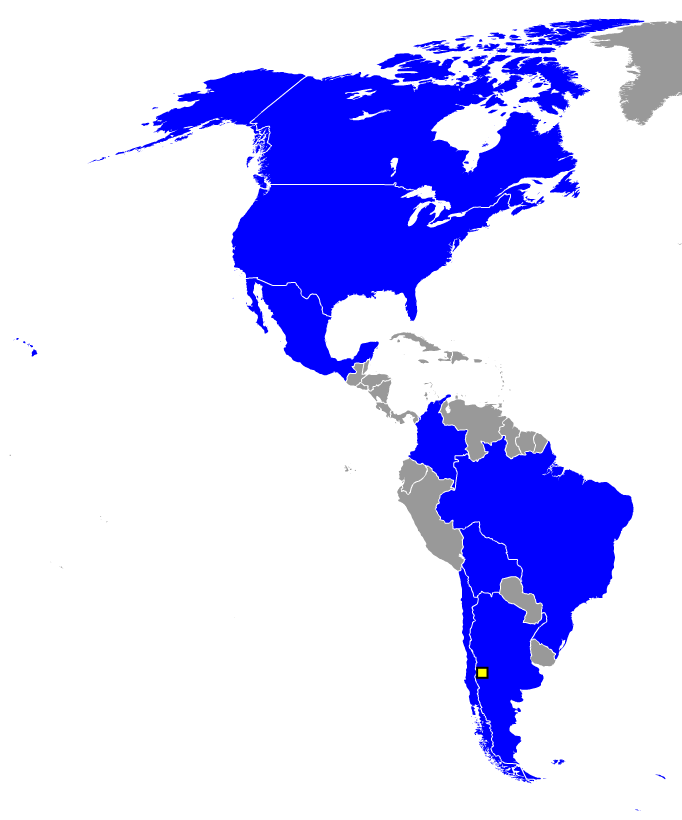
The participant nations of the first and only Winter Pan American Games, held in Las Leñas.

- Argentina (26)
- Bolivia (2)
- Brazil (5)
- Canada (25)
- Chile (9)
- Colombia (1)
- Mexico (4)
- United States (25)

== Medal table ==
Rank	Nation	Gold	Silver	Bronze	Total
1	United States	4	2	5	11
2	Canada	2	4	1	7
Totals (2 entries)		6	6	6	18

== Medal-winning athletes ==
- Reference:Olympedia.org/

Slalom Downhill

Event	Gold	Silver	Bronze
Slalom Downhill - Men	Canada; Brian Stemmle	Canada; Rob Boyd	United States; A.J. Kitt

Event	Gold	Silver	Bronze
Slalom Downhill - Women	Canada; Kendra Kobelka	Canada; Lucie Laroche	United States; Hilary Lindh

Giant slalom

Event	Gold	Silver	Bronze
Giant slalom - Men	United States; Jeff Olson	United States; Nathaniel Bryan	United States; Jeremy Nobis

Event	Gold	Silver	Bronze
Giant slalom - Women	United States; Diann Roffe	Canada; Nancy Gee	Canada; Michelle McKendry

SuperG

Event	Gold	Silver	Bronze
Super G - Men	United States; A.J. Kitt	United States; Tommy Moe	United States; Jeremy Nobis

Event	Gold	Silver	Bronze
Super G - Women	United States; Krista Schmidinger	Canada; Kendra Kobelka	United States; Julie Parisien

== See also ==
- Winter Pan American Games
