= Claudio Nieto Jiménez =

Chilean ski mountaineer and triathlete (born 1977)

Personal information
- Born: September 24, 1977 (age 48) Santiago de Chile

Sport
- Sport: Skiing
Medal record
Men's ski mountaineering
Representing Chile
South American Championship
| Silver medal – second place | 2007 Termas de Chillán | Individual |

Claudio Nieto Jiménez (born September 24, 1977) is a Chilean ski mountaineer and triathlete.

Nieto was born in Santiago de Chile. As a military officer in the ran of a Capitán, he serves as a skiing instructor and high mountain guide in the Chilean Army. Currently he studies civil engineering at Academia Politécnica Militar, the polytechnic academie of the national military forces. He also coaches the national ski mountaineering selection.

In 2007, he participated at the 2007 South American Ski Mountaineering Championship, and won Silver.
