= Alfonso Nieto-Castanon =

Spanish computational neuroscientist

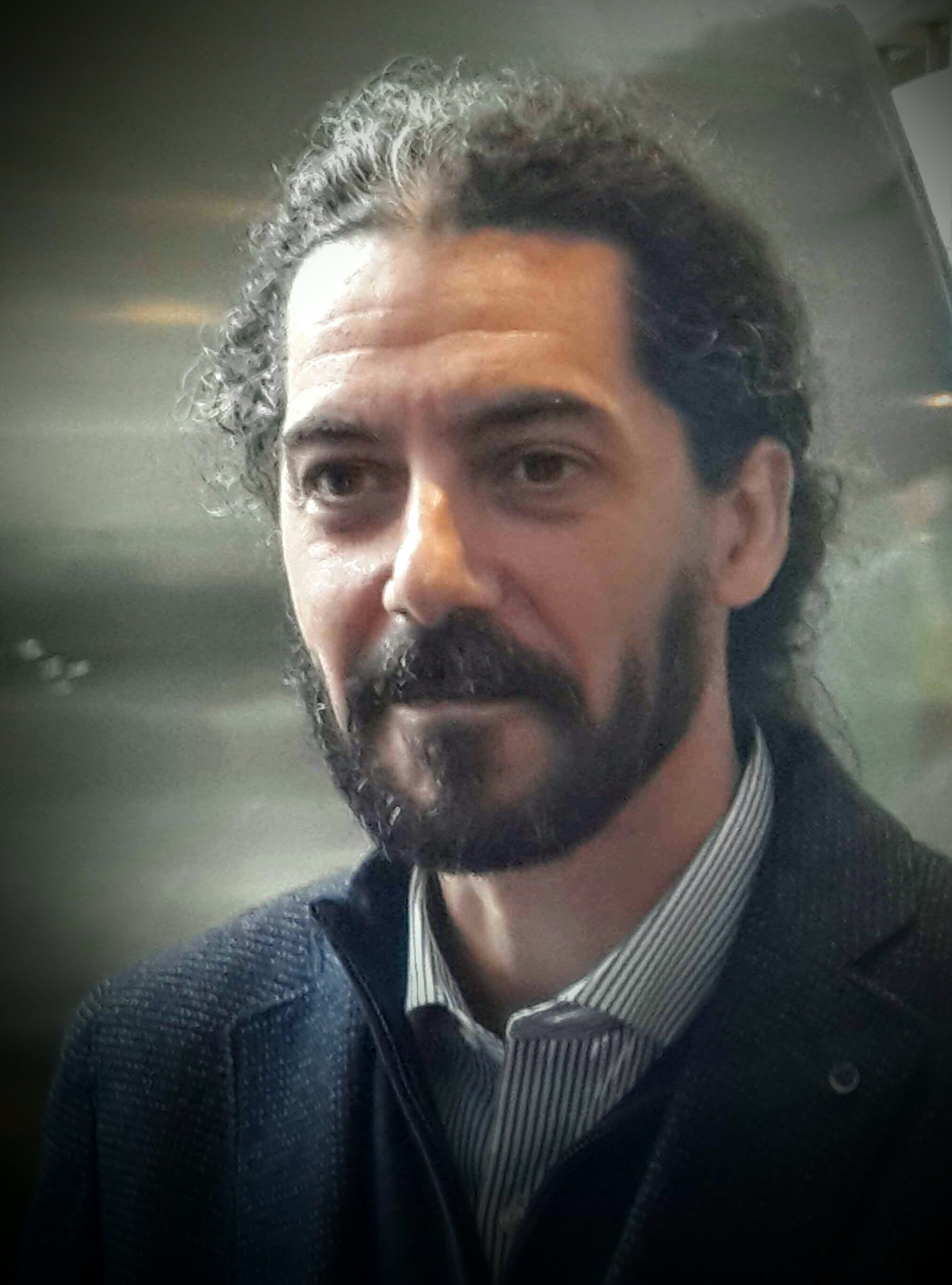
- Alfonso Nieto-Castanon in 2016
- Born: September 1972 (age 54); Spain
- Education: Universidad de Valladolid, Boston University
- Known for: functional neuroimaging, subject-specific ROIs, connectome, CONN
- Scientific career
- Fields: Computational neuroscience, Neuroimaging
- Workplaces: Boston University, Massachusetts Institute of Technology
- Doctoral advisor: Frank H. Guenther

Alfonso Nieto-Castanon (born September 1972) is a Spanish computational neuroscientist and developer of computational neuroimaging analysis methods and tools. He is a visiting researcher at the Boston University College of Health and Rehabilitation Sciences, and research affiliate at MIT McGovern Institute for Brain Research. His research focuses on the understanding and characterization of human brain dynamics underlying mental function.

== Early life and education ==
Nieto-Castanon was born in Spain in 1972. He was part of the first Spanish team to participate in the International Physics Olympiad in 1990. He went to college at the Universidad de Valladolid from 1991 to 1995 and earned a B.S./M.S. in Telecommunications Engineering. In 1998 he pursued graduate studies in Boston University Cognitive and Neural Systems Department and was awarded a research training fellowship from Fundación Séneca/Cedetel, and a graduate research fellowship from Boston University. He received a Ph.D. in Computational Neuroscience in 2004.

== Contributions to science ==
=== ROI analyses ===
In some of his early work Nieto-Castanon helped develop novel methods for region of interest (ROI) analyses of fMRI data, with a focus on multivariate techniques and the use of subject-specific ROIs, where regions of interest are defined differently for each person based on common anatomical or functional landmarks. Subject-specific ROIs allowed researchers to probe the limits of the functional localization hypotheses common in neuroimaging, and better understand the spatial and functional specificity of different brain areas.

=== Brain-computer interfaces ===
In collaboration with Boston University's Neural Prosthesis Laboratory, Nieto-Castanon helped build a Neuroprosthetic device for real-time speech synthesis. This system was designed to allow patients with locked-in syndrome to produce speech by decoding signals from a neurotrophic electrode implanted in the brain.

=== Functional connectivity ===
Nieto-Castanon also developed multiple influential mathematical and computational techniques for functional connectivity analyses, with a special emphasis on the robust estimation of functional connectivity measures in the presence of subject-motion and physiological noise sources. In 2011 he developed CONN to integrate and facilitate best practices in functional connectivity studies. CONN included a combination of novel methods such as multivariate connectivity analyses and dynamic connectivity estimation, together with multiple well known techniques such as psycho-physiological interactions, graph analyses, or independent component analyses. His software has been since widely adopted in the field and it is now regularly used in functional connectivity studies, with over 900 citations during 2021 alone

Nieto-Castanon has given numerous courses and lectures worldwide and his work has been cited in over 8000 refereed journal articles to date.

== International competitions ==
Beyond his research, Nieto-Castanon is also recognized for his participation in international programming and data-analysis competitions. Programming in Matlab, Nieto-Castanon won in 2009 and in 2011 the Color Bridge and Vines MathWorks collaborative-programming competitions. He was also the winner in 2011 of the Microsoft Kinect video gesture identification competition, obtained second place at the Marinexplore and Cornell University Whale Detection audio classification challenge, took first prize in 2013 Genentech's Flu Forecasting predictive model competition, and placed second in MathWorks 2014 bin packing optimization competition. In 2013 Nieto-Castanon was ranked as the third best data-scientist in Kaggle, and he has been ranked as the best Matlab programmer in MathWorks Cody games for seven consecutive years between 2013 and 2019.
