= Cerro Castor =

Argentine ski resort

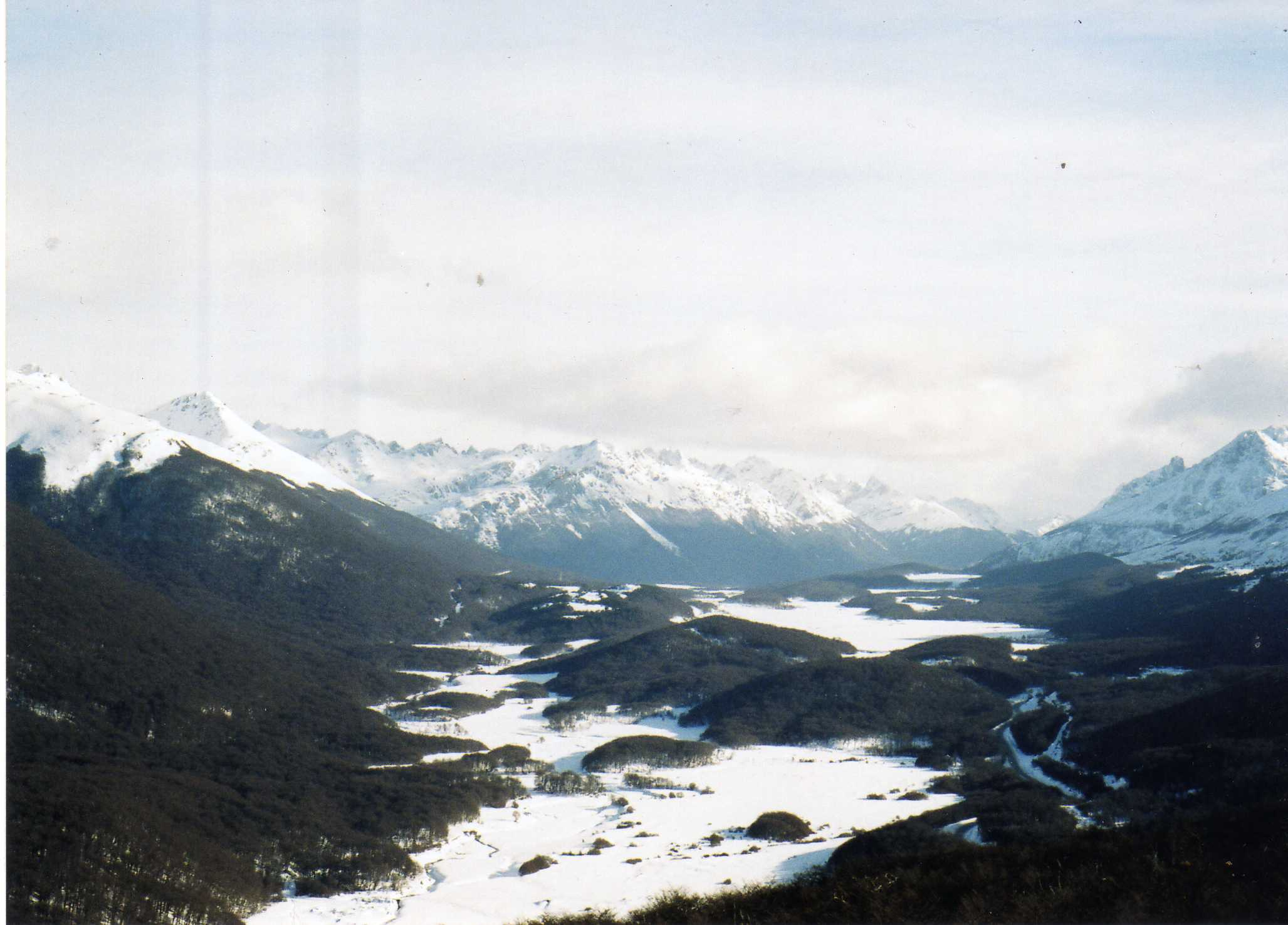
- Interactive map of Cerro Castor
- Location: Tierra del Fuego, Patagonia, Argentina
- Nearest city: Ushuaia, 26 kilometres (16 mi)
- Coordinates: 54°43′26.04″S 68°1′1.35″W
- Top elevation: 1,057 m (3,468 ft)
- Skiable area: 650 hectares (1,600 acres)
- Trails: 31 – 30 kilometres (19 mi); Green – 8 Blue – 5 Red – 8 Black – 4
- Lift system: 5 Chairlifts; 3 T-bar lifts 4 Magic carpets
- Lift capacity: 9,500/hour
- Snowmaking: 17 cannons

Cerro Castor is a ski resort on the southern slope of Mount Krund, 26 kilometres (16 mi) from the city of Ushuaia, in the Argentine province of Tierra del Fuego. Its tracks can be used during several months because of the cold weather of the region. The standard season takes place between June and October, and it is, thanks to the geographic location, the longest among the main ski centers in Argentina. Cerro Castor is the southernmost ski resort in the world.

== Ski resort ==
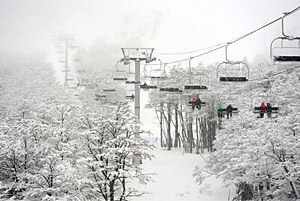
Cerro Castor

This important ski center was inaugurated in 1999. As of 2012, there are ten lift facilities in the resort, enabling to carry up to 9,500 people per hour: four four-seats chairlifts, three T-bars and three magic carpets. Cerro Castor has twenty-eight snowmass trails (with 600 hectares or 1,500 acres of usable surface and a vertical drop of 800 m or 2,600 ft), a snowpark, several restaurants and tearooms, recreation facilities, mountain shelters, a skiing school, a first-aid service, and a lenga beech forest. Many of the trails are harmonized by the International Ski Federation. Besides classic alpine skiing, the center offers other activities such as snowboarding, skiboarding, ski touring, sleds, cross-country skiing and snowshoes.

== International events ==
In 2012 Cerro Castor hosted the FIS Freestyle Slopestyle World Cup, organized by the International Ski Federation (FIS), and qualifying competition for the 2014 Winter Olympic Games The results were as follows:

Date	Place	Winner	Score	Second	Score	Third	Score	Report
September 7, 2012	(Argentina) Ushuaia	(United Kingdom) James Woods	90.4	(Sweden) Henrik Harlaut	84.4	(Switzerland) Jonas Hunziker	74.6	
September 7, 2012	(Argentina) Ushuaia	(United States) Keri Herman	85.0	(Switzerland) Eveline Bhend	79.8	(Canada) Dara Howell	65.4	

The Interski Congress and World Cup, organized by the International Ski Instructors Association, was hosted by Cerro Castor from 5 to 12 September 2015 in which was the first ever event held by this association in the Southern Hemisphere.

== See also ==
- Cerro Catedral
- Chapelco
- Las Leñas
- List of ski areas and resorts in South America
