= Chapelco =

Mountain in Argentina

Cerro Chapelco
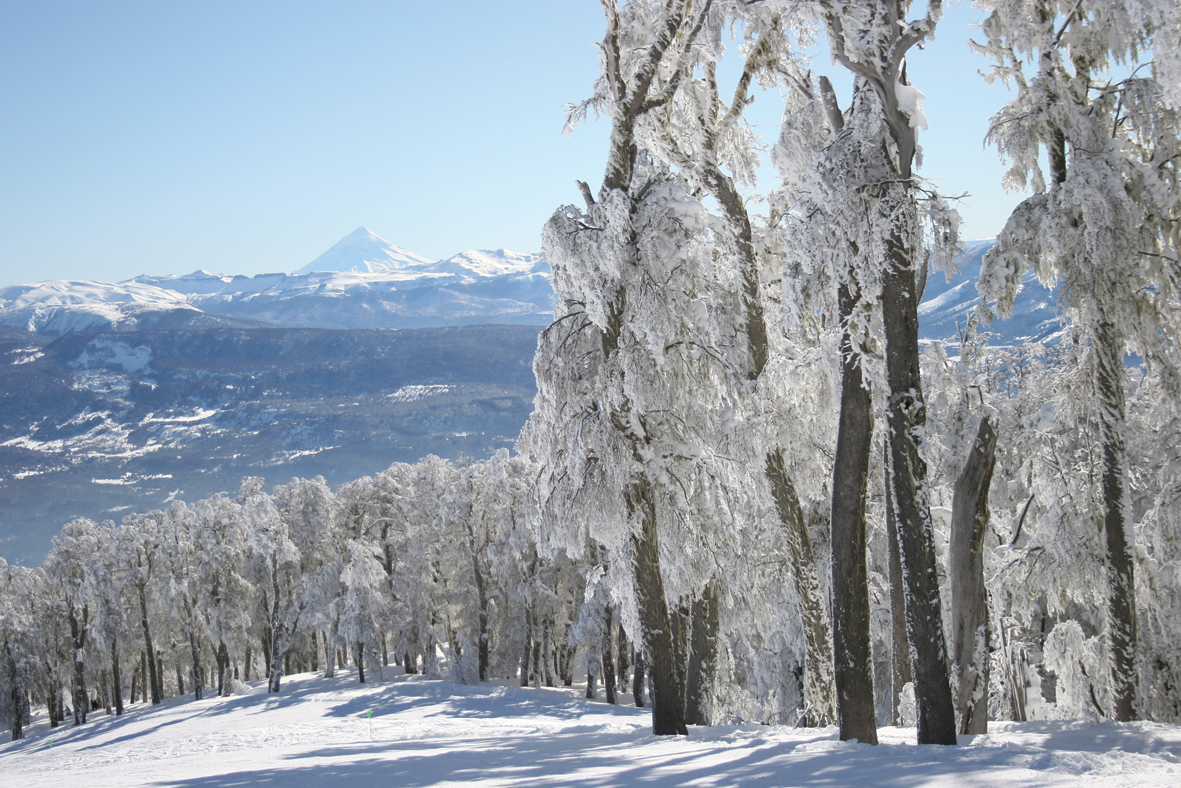
- Interactive map of Cerro Chapelco
- Location: Neuquén Province, Argentina
- Nearest city: San Martín de los Andes, 19 kilometres (12 mi)
- Coordinates: 40°10′S 71°20′W
- Vertical: 730 metres (2,400 ft)
- Top elevation: 1,980 metres (6,500 ft)
- Base elevation: 1,250 metres (4,100 ft)
- Skiable area: 140 hectares (350 acres)
- Trails: 29 - 24.6 kilometres (15.3 mi). Green - 9 Blue - 5 Red - 12; Black - 3
- Longest run: 5.3 kilometres (3.3 mi)
- Lift system: 1 Gondola lift 5 Chairlifts; 4 T-bar lifts 2 Magic carpets 4 Ski tows 2 Conveyor belts
- Lift capacity: 14,500/hour
- Snowfall: base: 1.5 metres (4.9 ft) top: 2.5 metres (8.2 ft)
- Snowmaking: 500 cannons
- Website: chapelco.com

Chapelco, or Cerro Chapelco, is a mountain and massif in Neuquén Province, south-western Argentina. The ski station of the same name is located 19 kilometres (12 mi) from the resort town of San Martín de los Andes.

Designed by Federico Graeff and established in 1946, Chapelco became an increasingly popular tourist destination after 1970. The station maintains a ski and snowboard school with 200 instructors for all ages as well as numerous lodges, the most important of which is the Graeff Lodge; eight restaurants; a ski and snowboard rental and repair center; boutiques and cybercafés; and emergency and other basic services. The station is accessible via National Route 234 from San Martín de los Andes, and via a two-hour flight from Jorge Newbery Airport in Buenos Aires to the Aviador Carlos Campos Airport.

Chapelco hosted Snowboardcross events for the 2008-09 and 2009-10 FIS Snowboard World Cup:

Date	Place	Gender	Discipline	Winner	Second	Third
September 13, 2008	(Argentina) Chapelco	Men's	Snowboardcross	Pierre Vaultier (FRA)	Stian Sivertzen (NOR)	Mateusz Ligocki (POL)
September 13, 2008	(Argentina) Chapelco	Women's	Snowboardcross	Lindsey Jacobellis (USA)	Mellie Francon (SUI)	Maëlle Ricker (CAN)

Date	Place	Gender	Discipline	Winner	Second	Third
September 12, 2009	(Argentina) Chapelco	Men's	Snowboardcross	Pierre Vaultier (FRA)	Seth Wescott (USA)	Graham Watanabe (USA)
September 12, 2009	(Argentina) Chapelco	Women's	Snowboardcross	Maëlle Ricker (CAN)	Aleksandra Zhekova (BUL)	Dominique Maltais (CAN)

== See also ==
- Cerro Catedral
- Cerro Castor
- Las Leñas
- List of ski areas and resorts in South America
