= Cerro Catedral =

Mountain in Argentina

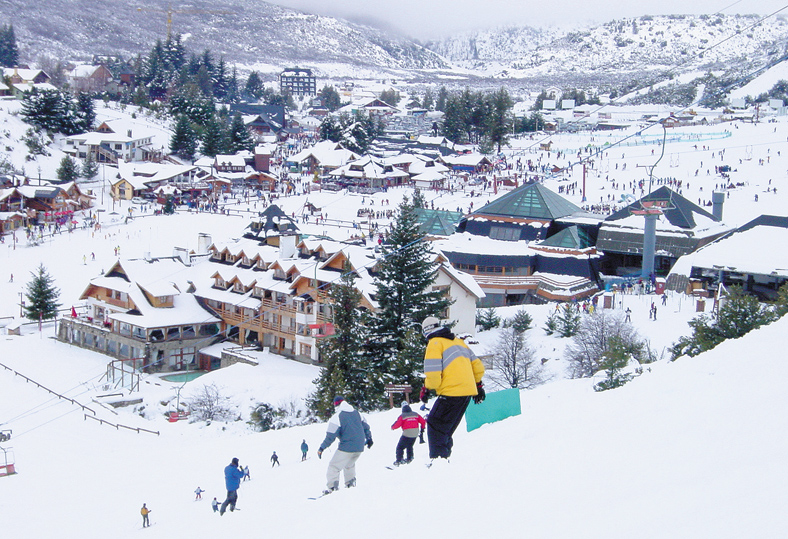
- Cerro Catedral in winter
- Interactive map of Cerro Catedral
- Location: Río Negro, Patagonia, Argentina
- Nearest city: San Carlos de Bariloche, 19 kilometres (12 mi)
- Coordinates: 41°11′S 71°27′W
- Top elevation: 2,100 m (6,900 ft)
- Base elevation: 1,030 m (3,380 ft)
- Skiable area: 600 hectares (1,500 acres)
- Trails: 31 - 48 kilometres (30 mi); Green - 4 Blue - 11; Red - 12; Black - 5
- Longest run: 9 km
- Lift system: 39
- Lift capacity: 35,000/hour
- Snowfall: 300 cm (median)
- Website: Catedral

Cerro Catedral is a mountain located 19 kilometres (12 mi) from San Carlos de Bariloche, and inside the Nahuel Huapí National Park, in Patagonia, Argentina.

The complex is one of the most important ski resorts in Argentina, with a skiable area of 6 km^{2} (2.3 sq mi), 48 km (30 mi) of ski runs, and a lift capacity of 35,000 skiers per hour. It is also popular due to the views of the Nahuel Huapi lake. There are also a number of hotels and hostels at the foot of the mountain, and a summer hikers' hut called Refugio Lynch on one of the tops of the mountain.

During the summer, the Refugio Frey and a camping accommodate trekkers and rock climbers next to Tonček lagoon, near the Torre Principal; Catedral's highest point.

On August 27, 2005, the 1st South American Ski Mountaineering Championship in combination with the last race of the 2005 South American Ski Mountaineering Cup and the 2nd International Open of ski mountaineering was carried out on the Cerro Catedral.

== Climate ==
The climate is affected by the altitude. At higher elevations, at the weather station, the climate is classified as an alpine climate or a tundra climate (Köppen ET) while at lower elevations, the climate is classified as a cool mediterranean climate (Köppen: Csb). Cerro Catedral has the highest frequency of days with snowfalls in Argentina, averaging 98 days per year.

Climate data for Cerro Catedral, Elevation: 1,955 m. (1961-1970)
Month	Jan	Feb	Mar	Apr	May	Jun	Jul	Aug	Sep	Oct	Nov	Dec	Year
Record high °C (°F)	27.5 (81.5)	25.5 (77.9)	23.0 (73.4)	19.4 (66.9)	16.4 (61.5)	13.4 (56.1)	13.6 (56.5)	12.3 (54.1)	15.9 (60.6)	21.2 (70.2)	24.8 (76.6)	25.6 (78.1)	27.5 (81.5)
Mean daily maximum °C (°F)	12.8 (55.0)	11.9 (53.4)	10.6 (51.1)	6.9 (44.4)	3.7 (38.7)	−0.2 (31.6)	−0.5 (31.1)	−0.6 (30.9)	0.6 (33.1)	5.2 (41.4)	8.5 (47.3)	11.0 (51.8)	5.8 (42.4)
Daily mean °C (°F)	7.5 (45.5)	7.2 (45.0)	5.7 (42.3)	3.0 (37.4)	0.8 (33.4)	−2.4 (27.7)	−2.7 (27.1)	−2.9 (26.8)	−2.3 (27.9)	1.0 (33.8)	3.7 (38.7)	6.0 (42.8)	2.1 (35.8)
Mean daily minimum °C (°F)	3.2 (37.8)	3.0 (37.4)	1.9 (35.4)	−0.1 (31.8)	−1.8 (28.8)	−4.6 (23.7)	−5 (23)	−5.1 (22.8)	−4.7 (23.5)	−1.8 (28.8)	0.2 (32.4)	2.0 (35.6)	−1.1 (30.0)
Record low °C (°F)	−6.8 (19.8)	−7.0 (19.4)	−7.6 (18.3)	−10.7 (12.7)	−11.7 (10.9)	−14.0 (6.8)	−13.9 (7.0)	−12.9 (8.8)	−12.4 (9.7)	−10.2 (13.6)	−8.6 (16.5)	−7.6 (18.3)	−14.0 (6.8)
Average precipitation mm (inches)	59 (2.3)	53 (2.1)	54 (2.1)	100 (3.9)	196 (7.7)	206 (8.1)	222 (8.7)	264 (10.4)	104 (4.1)	79 (3.1)	52 (2.0)	78 (3.1)	1,467 (57.8)
Average precipitation days	7	8	8	10	16	15	15	16	9	7	8	7	126
Average snowy days	3	3	4	6	11	14	15	15	11	7	5	4	98
Average relative humidity (%)	67.5	65.0	69.0	77.5	80.0	85.0	83.5	84.5	80.5	75.5	69.5	70.0	75.6
Mean monthly sunshine hours	294.5	254.3	229.4	171.0	130.2	90.0	86.8	102.3	156.0	217.0	237.0	291.4	2,259.9
Percentage possible sunshine	65	65	59	52	41	32	28	32	43	53	55	62	49
Source 1: Servico Meteorológico National, UNLP (snowfall data)
Source 2: Secretaria de Mineria (extremes and sun, 1961–1970 and 1981–1990)

== Gallery ==
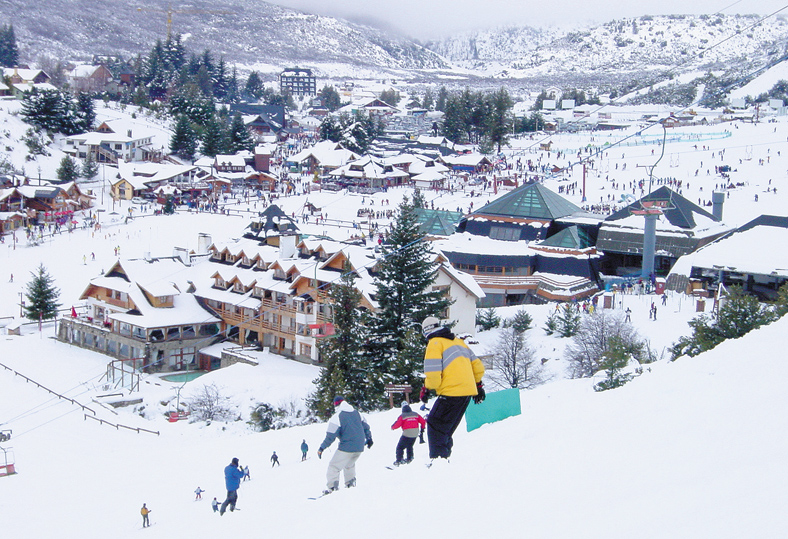
Cerro Catedral in winter

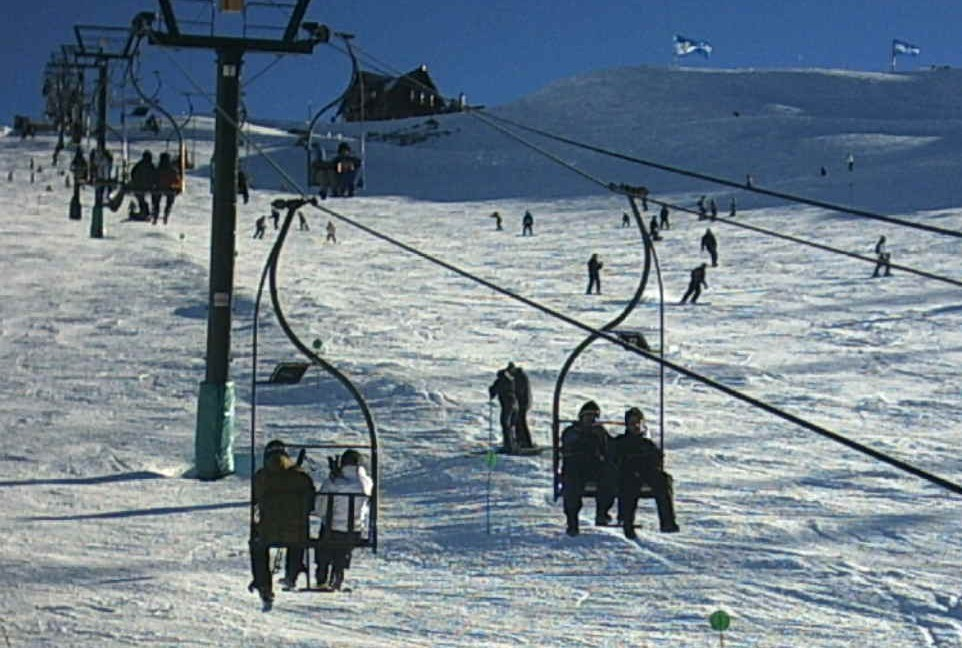
Ski lift and Refugio Lynch on the top of the Cerro Catedral

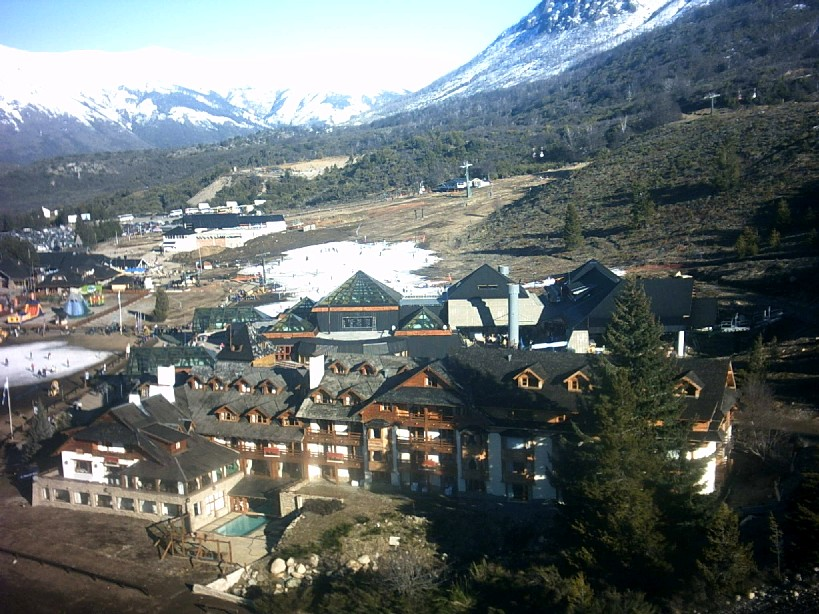
Ski resort during the summer

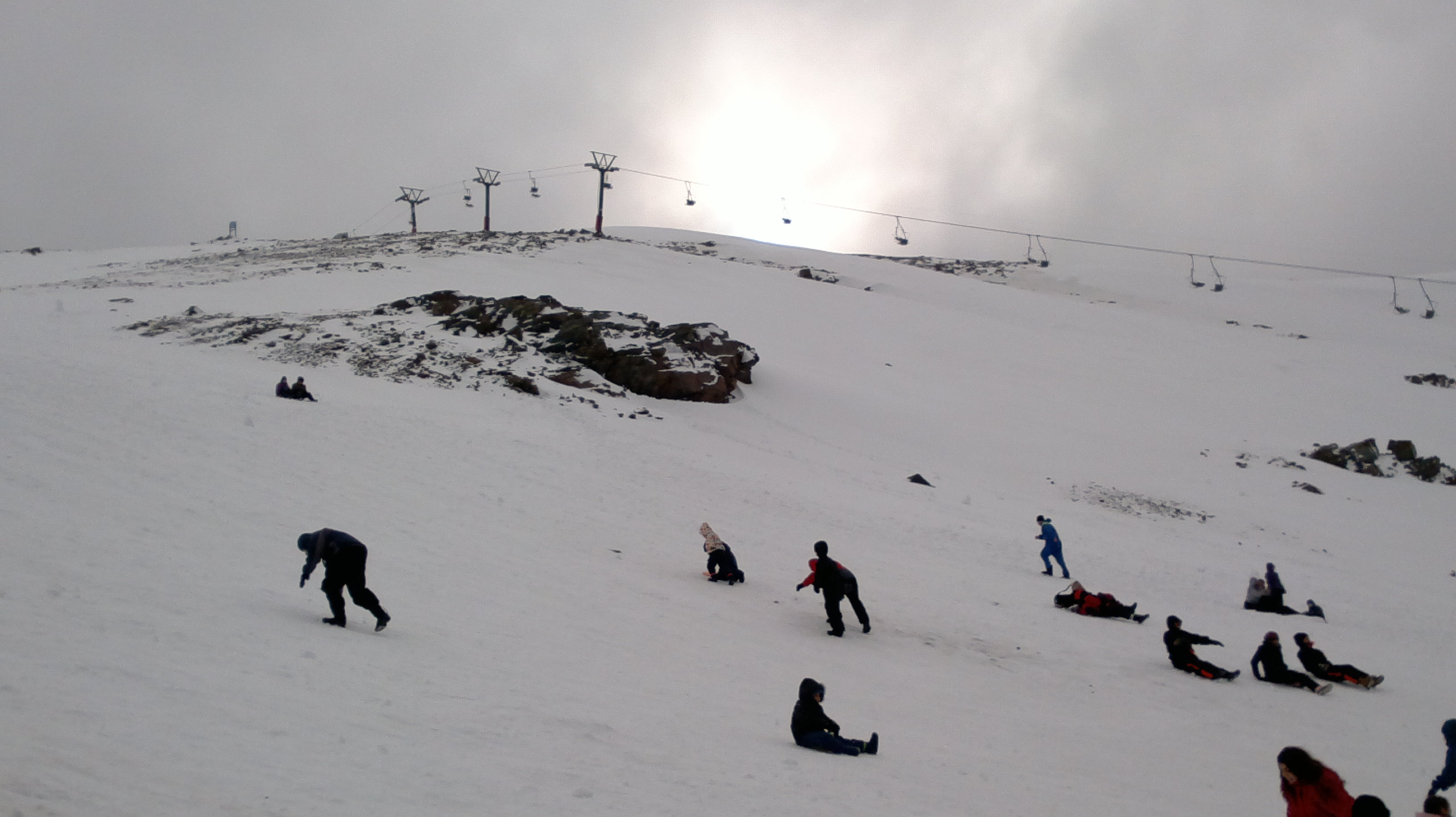
Cerro Catedral Ski resort

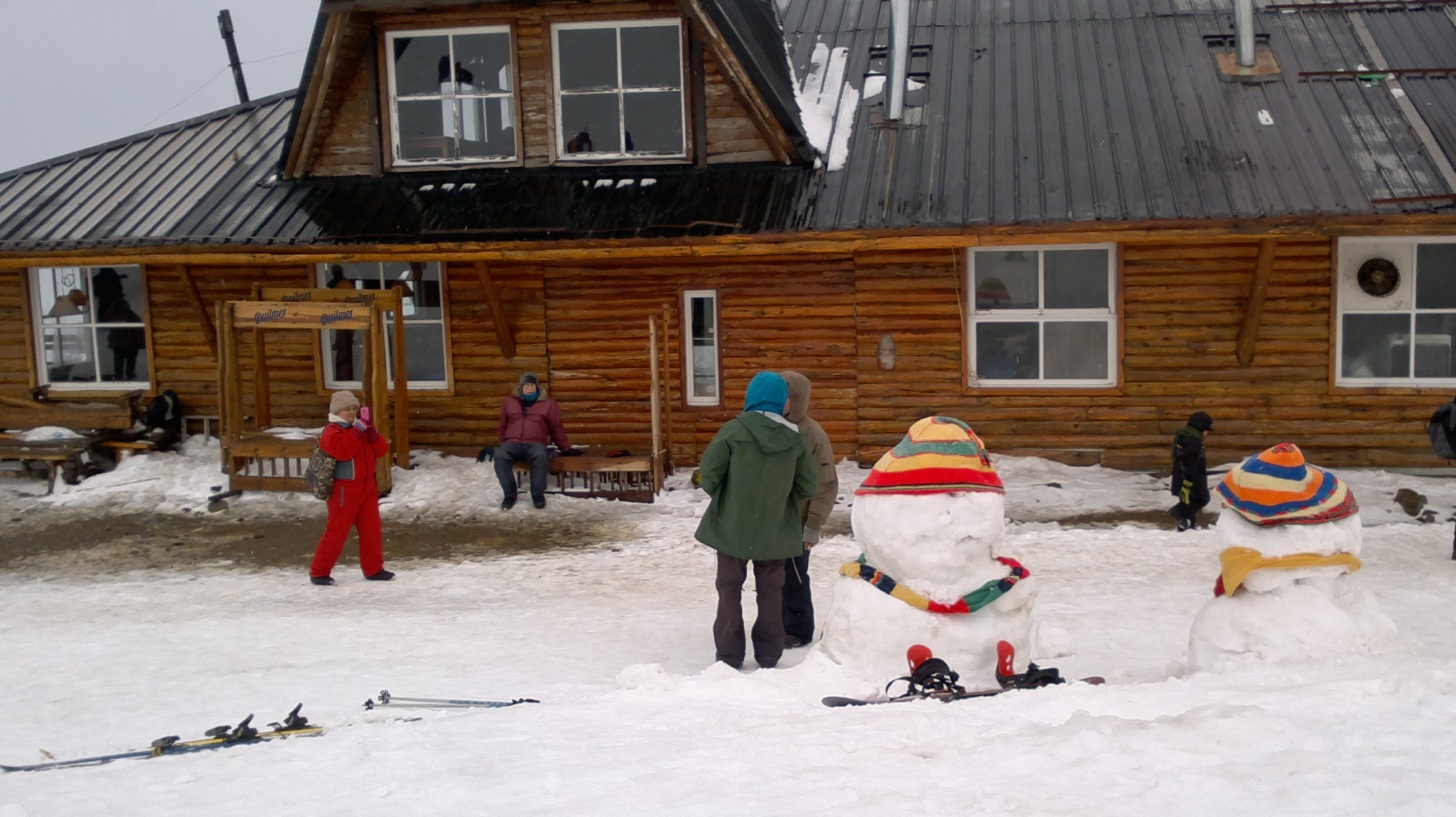
Cerro Catedral Ski resort Refugio Lynch

== Panoramas ==
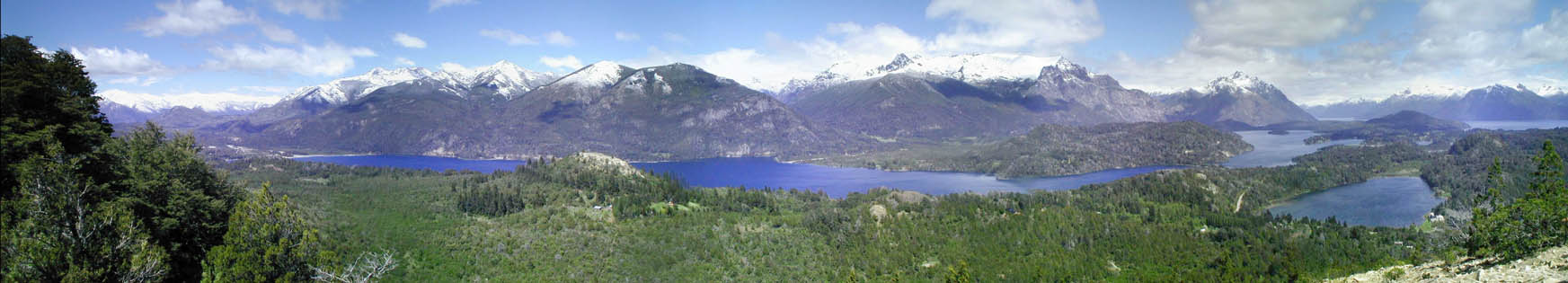

Campanario Hill, Lakes Moreno and El Trébol

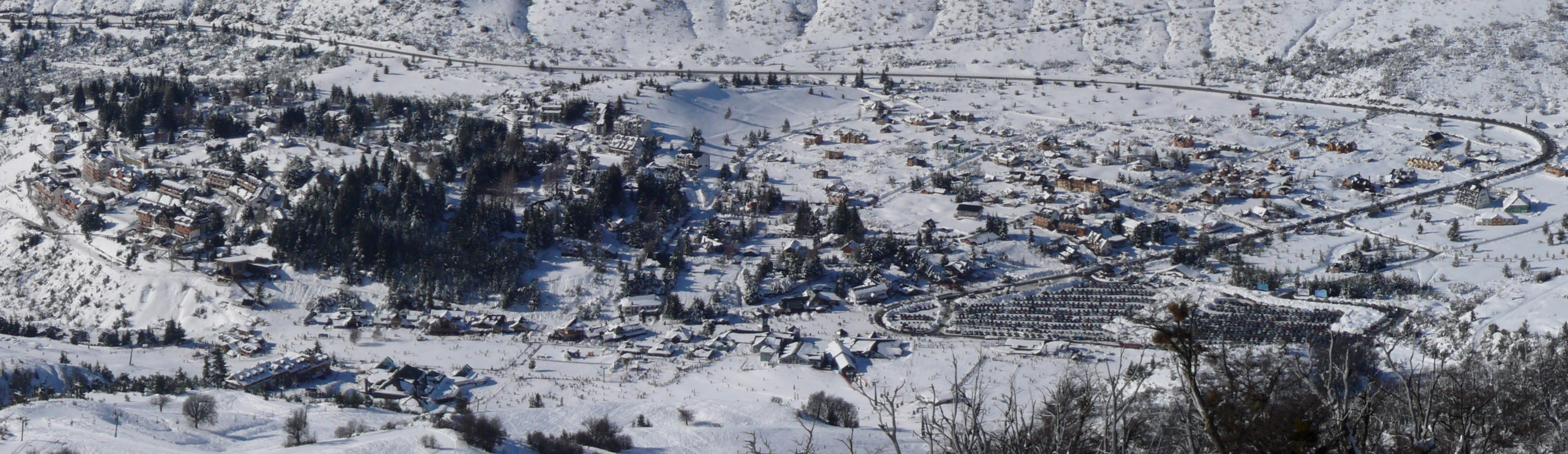

Catedral ski resort in winter

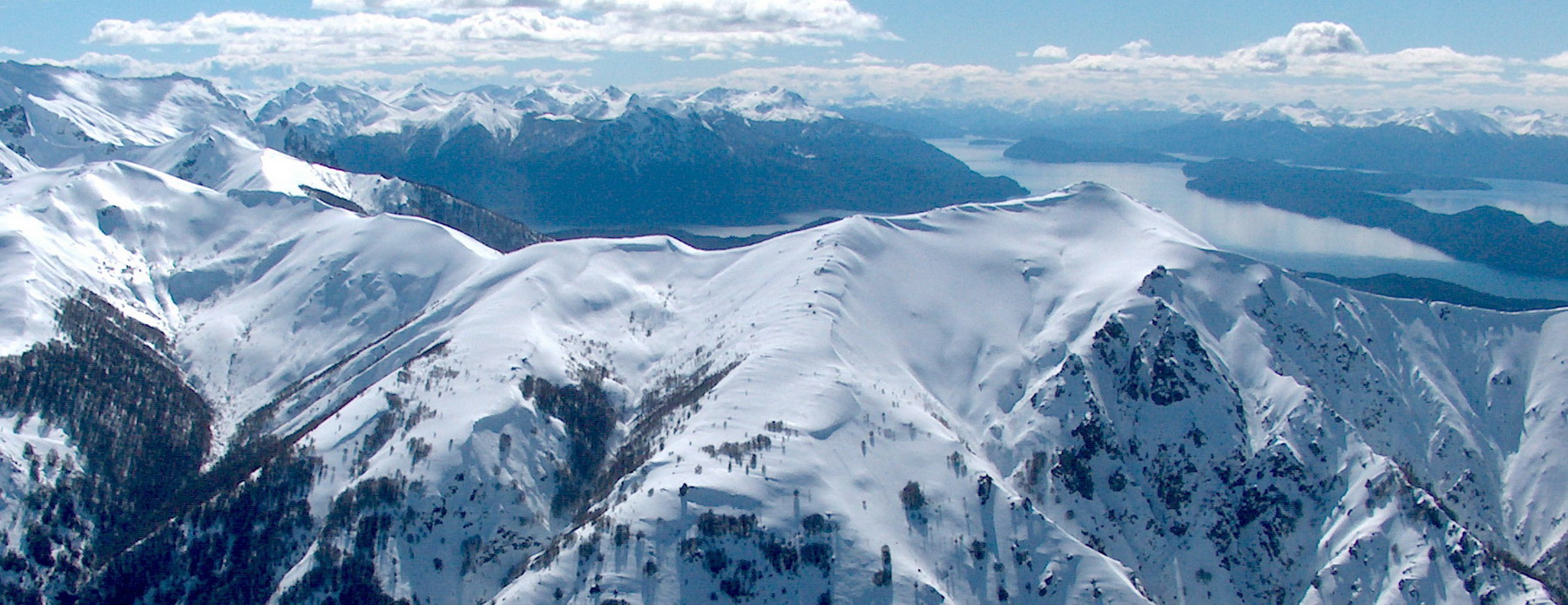

From the top, Cerro Bellavista, Nahuel Huapi lake and the Andes

== See also ==
- Cerro Castor
- Chapelco
- Las Leñas
- List of ski areas and resorts in South America
