= Las Leñas =

Ski resort in Mendoza, Cuyo, Argentina

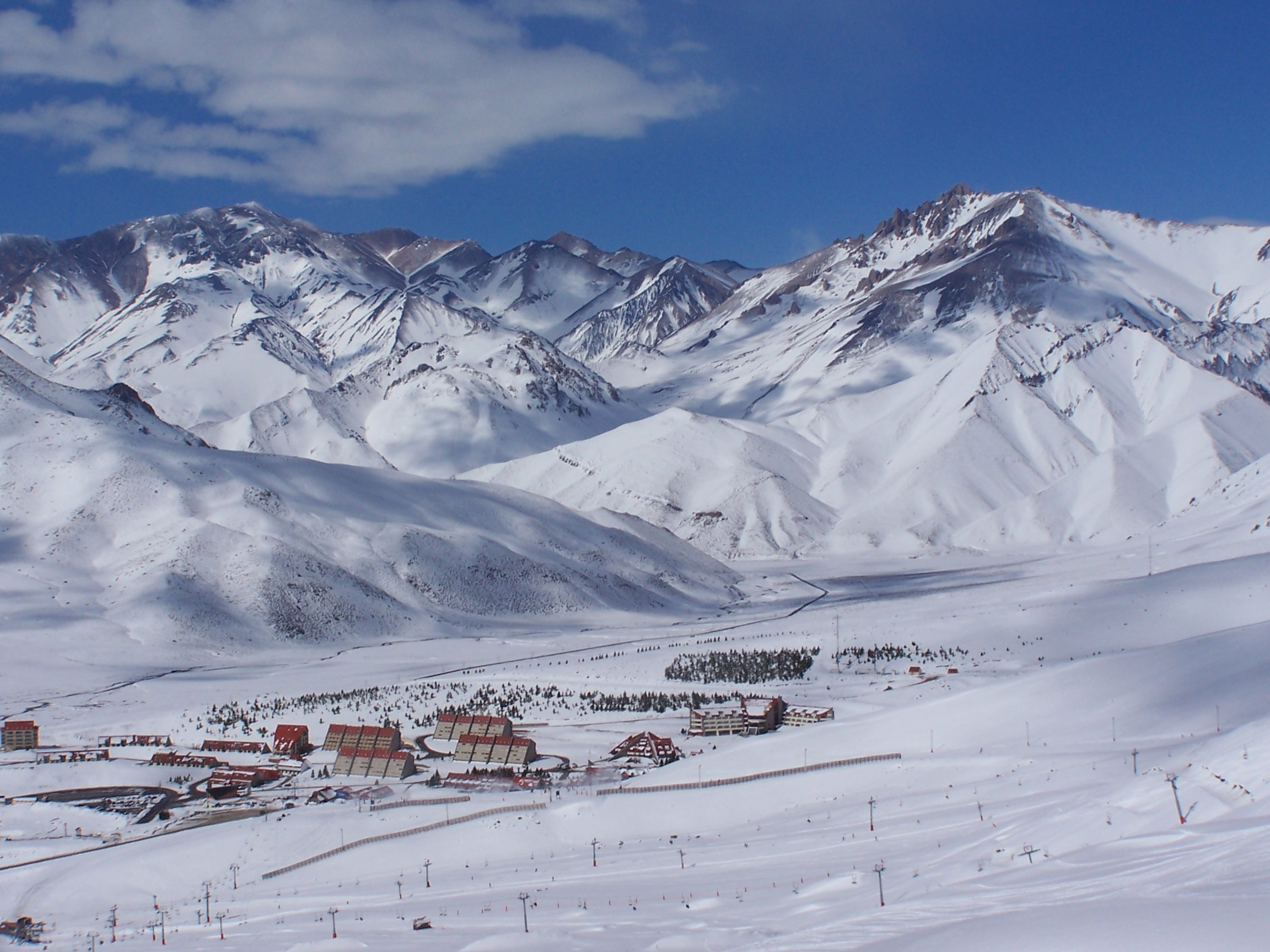
- View of the valley
- Interactive map of Las Leñas
- Location: Mendoza, Cuyo, Argentina
- Coordinates: 35.146888°S 70.081139°W
- Vertical: 1,190 m (3,900 ft)
- Top elevation: 3,430 m (11,250 ft)
- Base elevation: 2,240 m (7,350 ft)
- Skiable area: 17,500 hectares (43,000 acres)
- Trails: 40; Green - 15% Blue - 45% Red - 35% Black - 5%
- Longest run: 7 km (4.3 mi)
- Lift system: 14
- Lift capacity: 9,500/hour
- Snowmaking: 30 cannons
- Website: Las Leñas

Las Leñas is a ski resort in Argentina, located in the western part of Mendoza Province. It has reliable powder snow and climate for extreme and off-piste skiing. Construction of the ski center began January 1983, and by July 1983, it opened with a 300 bed hotel. The ski area has a good diversity of slopes ranging from very easy to extreme, including a good range of off-piste areas apt for extreme skiing. The skiable area base starts at an altitude of 2,240 m (7,350 feet) above mean sea level and goes up to 3,430 m (11,253 ft) for a total drop of 1,190 m (3,904 ft). The skiable surface amounts to 2.3 km^{2} (1 mi^{2}), with 27 runs and a maximum non-stop skiable distance of 7 km (4 mi) (not including off run alternatives). The total ski area reachable by land is the largest in South America. It currently houses Piscis Hotel, the highest casino by elevation in the world.

The skiing season usually lasts from mid June to mid October; however, recent seasons have ended as early as mid-September. The center is also open during the southern hemisphere summer for mountain activities including mountain biking, horse riding, climbing and other activities.

The ski center includes a ski and snowboard school for all ages and childcare facilities. Specific workshops are also offered at the school to profit from the huge expanses of off-piste runs offered by the area.

The accommodations available on-site include hotels (mostly up-scale), apartment hotels and sleep houses. There is a small shopping center that includes a bank, ski-related shops, chocolate shops, souvenir shops, and a supermarket. Coffee houses, restaurants, and night clubs complete the town's commercial center.

Far away from large cities, the center is seldom crowded except during weekends, making the lines on the lifts usually shorter than in other ski centers of Argentina.

Las Leñas hosted men's downhill events for the 1986 and 1987 Alpine Skiing World Cup, women's downhill and super-G events in 1990 and the only Winter Pan American Games in 1990.

== Geographic location ==
Las Leñas is located 1,200 km (750 mi) from Buenos Aires, and can be reached by car, bus or airplane. Aeroplanes make use of the Comodoro D. Ricardo Salomón Airport close to Malargüe, some 95 km (59 mi) from Las Leñas, and the Suboficial Aytes Germano Airport near San Rafael (regular domestic flights) where buses make the connection with Las Leñas.

The road to Las Leñas is paved and seldom blocked by snow, although bad weather or poor surface conditions can sometimes lead to its being temporarily closed by the Gendarmería (border guards). Vehicles are required to use snow chains unless they are equipped with appropriate tires for snow and ice.

=== Elevation ===
- Base: 2,240 m (7,350 feet)
- Mid-mountain: 2,835 m (9,301 feet)
- Top: 3,430 m (11,250 feet)
- Vertical drop: 1,230 m (4,040 feet)

== Climate ==
According to the Köppen climate classification, Las Leñas has a warm-summer mediterranean continental climate (Dsb), as 4 months have an average temperature above 10 °C (50 °F) and at least one month (in its case 3, being June, July, and August) has an average temperature below 0 °C (32 °F). Continental climates are highly atypical of the Southern Hemisphere. In South America they are found in a handful of other stations like Puente del Inca. Summers are moderate and very dry, while winters are very snowy.

Climate data for Valle Hermoso, elevation: 2293 m (1961–1976)
| Month | Jan | Feb | Mar | Apr | May | Jun | Jul | Aug | Sep | Oct | Nov | Dec | Year |
|---|---|---|---|---|---|---|---|---|---|---|---|---|---|
| Record high °C (°F) | 28.5 (83.3) | 28.0 (82.4) | 27.7 (81.9) | 24.3 (75.7) | 22.0 (71.6) | 15.9 (60.6) | 17.0 (62.6) | 18.8 (65.8) | 20.1 (68.2) | 19.8 (67.6) | 28.0 (82.4) | 27.1 (80.8) | 28.5 (83.3) |
| Mean daily maximum °C (°F) | 21.0 (69.8) | 20.7 (69.3) | 19.0 (66.2) | 16.0 (60.8) | 9.1 (48.4) | 3.4 (38.1) | 3.3 (37.9) | 3.5 (38.3) | 6.2 (43.2) | 8.3 (46.9) | 13.8 (56.8) | 17.5 (63.5) | 11.8 (53.3) |
| Daily mean °C (°F) | 14.0 (57.2) | 13.3 (55.9) | 11.1 (52.0) | 8.3 (46.9) | 3.2 (37.8) | −1.4 (29.5) | −2.2 (28.0) | −2.0 (28.4) | 0.4 (32.7) | 3.0 (37.4) | 7.9 (46.2) | 11.2 (52.2) | 5.6 (42.0) |
| Mean daily minimum °C (°F) | 6.6 (43.9) | 5.9 (42.6) | 3.7 (38.7) | 1.6 (34.9) | −1.7 (28.9) | −5.3 (22.5) | −6.7 (19.9) | −6.6 (20.1) | −4.7 (23.5) | −2.2 (28.0) | 1.8 (35.2) | 4.4 (39.9) | −0.3 (31.5) |
| Record low °C (°F) | −1.0 (30.2) | −2.9 (26.8) | −9.6 (14.7) | −9.0 (15.8) | −17.8 (0.0) | −17.0 (1.4) | −22.0 (−7.6) | −21.6 (−6.9) | −19.5 (−3.1) | −16.6 (2.1) | −8.2 (17.2) | −9.1 (15.6) | −22.0 (−7.6) |
| Average precipitation mm (inches) | 6.6 (0.26) | 10.1 (0.40) | 13.5 (0.53) | 27.3 (1.07) | 162.9 (6.41) | 249.6 (9.83) | 185.3 (7.30) | 93.1 (3.67) | 65.1 (2.56) | 55.4 (2.18) | 14.6 (0.57) | 5.7 (0.22) | 889.2 (35) |
Source: Servicio Meteorológico Nacional

== International events ==
=== Winter Pan American Games ===
In 1987 members of the Pan American Sports Organization (PASO) determined that the first Winter Pan American Games should take place in Las Leñas, Argentina in 1989 and be held every four years thereafter, but the lack of snow forced the inaugural Games to be postponed until 1990. The first Winter Pan American Games were held from September 16 to 22, with 97 athletes from eight nations participating: Argentina, Bolivia, Brazil, Canada, Chile, Colombia, Mexico and United States. The Games consisted of six events for only one sport, Alpine skiing, with three disciplines: Slalom, giant slalom and super-G.

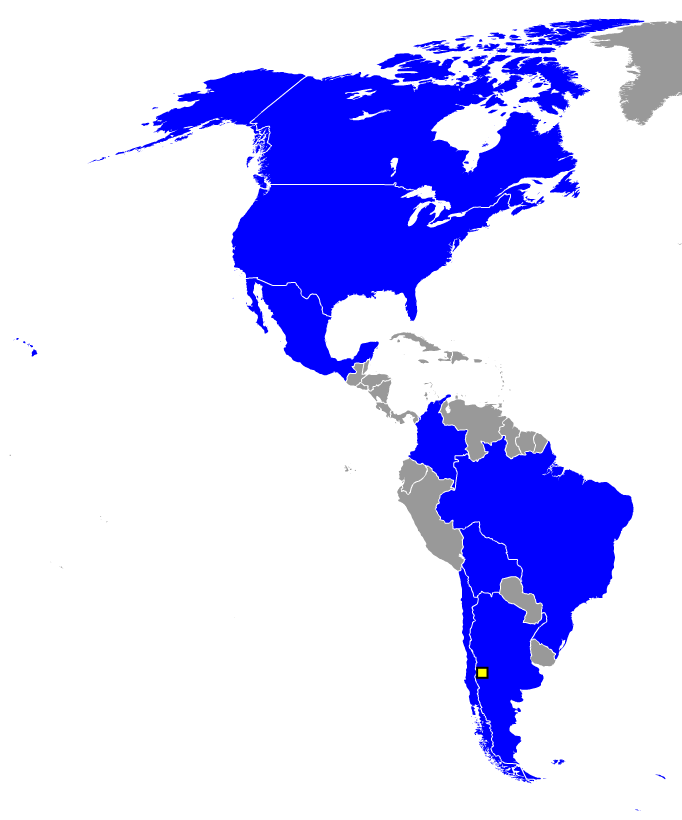
The participant nations of the first and only Winter Pan American Games, held in Las Leñas.

| Rank | Nation | Gold | Silver | Bronze | Total |
|---|---|---|---|---|---|
| 1 | United States (USA) | 4 | 2 | 5 | 11 |
| 2 | Canada (CAN) | 2 | 4 | 1 | 7 |
| 3 | Argentina (ARG) | 0 | 0 | 0 | 0 |
| 3 | Bolivia (BOL) | 0 | 0 | 0 | 0 |
| 3 | Brazil (BRA) | 0 | 0 | 0 | 0 |
| 3 | Chile (CHI) | 0 | 0 | 0 | 0 |
| 3 | Colombia (COL) | 0 | 0 | 0 | 0 |
| 3 | Mexico (MEX) | 0 | 0 | 0 | 0 |
| Totals (8 entries) | | 6 | 6 | 6 | 18 |

=== Alpine Skiing World Cup ===
On August 16 and 18, 1985 Las Leñas became the first Argentine ski resort to host an event for the International Ski Federation's Alpine Skiing World Cup. The first two men's downhill races of the 1985-86 season were held in Mendoza and the results were as follows:

| Place | Name | Country | Total points | 1 (Argentina) | 2 (Argentina) |
|---|---|---|---|---|---|
| 1 | Karl Alpiger | Switzerland | 50 | 25 | 25 |
| 2 | Markus Wasmeier | West Germany | 25 | 10 | 15 |
| 3 | Helmut Höflehner | Austria | 24 | 15 | 9 |
| 4 | Doug Lewis | United States | 21 | 20 | 1 |
| 5 | Bruno Kernen | Switzerland | 13 | 8 | 5 |
| 6 | Daniel Mahrer | Switzerland | 11 | - | 11 |
| | Franck Piccard | France | 11 | 11 | - |
| 8 | Rudolf Huber | Austria | 10 | - | 10 |
| | Peter Müller | Switzerland | 10 | (12) | 20 |
| 9 | Gerhard Pfaffenbichler | Austria | 8 | - | 8 |
| 10 | Stefan Niederseer | Austria | 6 | - | 6 |
| 11 | Pirmin Zurbriggen | Switzerland | 7 | 7 | - |
| | Todd Brooker | Canada | 7 | 3 | 4 |
| 13 | Atle Skårdal | Norway | 5 | 5 | - |
| 14 | Giorgio Piantanida | Italy | 3 | - | 3 |
| 15 | Harti Weirather | Austria | 2 | - | 2 |
| 16 | Werner Marti | Switzerland | 1 | 1 | - |
| 17 | Anton Steiner | Austria | (2) | (2) | - |
| 18 | Peter Wirnsberger | Austria | (3) | (9) | (12) |
| 19 | Franz Heinzer | Switzerland | (4) | (4) | - |
| 20 | Marc Girardelli | Luxembourg | (13) | (6) | (7) |

The following year Las Leñas held again the first two men's downhill races of the 1986-87 season, this time on August 15 and 16, 1986. The results were as follows:

| Place | Name | Country | Total points | 1 (Argentina) | 2 (Argentina) |
|---|---|---|---|---|---|
| 1 | Peter Müller | Switzerland | 40 | 25 | 15 |
| 2 | Leonhard Stock | Austria | 31 | 11 | 20 |
| 3 | Franz Heinzer | Switzerland | 30 | 15 | 15 |
| 4 | Marc Girardelli | Luxembourg | 18 | 12 | 6 |
| 5 | Peter Wirnsberger | Austria | 16 | 8 | 8 |
| 6 | Pirmin Zurbriggen | Switzerland | 15 | (10) | 25 |
| 7 | Karl Alpiger | Switzerland | 10 | 20 | (10) |
| 8 | Sepp Wildgruber | West Germany | 9 | 9 | - |
| | Igor Cigolla | Italy | 9 | 2 | 7 |
| 10 | Erwin Resch | Austria | 5 | 5 | - |
| | Helmut Höflehner | Austria | 5 | - | 5 |
| | Markus Wasmeier | West Germany | 5 | (6) | 11 |
| 13 | Atle Skårdal | Norway | 4 | 4 | - |
| | Anton Steiner | Austria | 4 | - | 4 |
| 15 | Danilo Sbardellotto | Italy | 3 | 3 | - |
| | Alberto Ghidoni | Italy | 3 | - | 3 |
| 17 | Gustav Oehrli | Switzerland | 1 | 1 | - |
| | Stefan Niederseer | Austria | 1 | (1) | 2 |
| 19 | Daniel Mahrer | Switzerland | (16) | (7) | (9) |

The Alpine Skiing World Cup was once again held in Las Leñas for the 1989-90 season. This time the events that took place in Argentina were the women's downhill (race 1), on August 8, and women's super-G (race 2), on August 9. Once again both races started the season. The results were as follows:

| Place | Name | Country | Total points | 1 (Argentina) | 2 (Argentina) |
|---|---|---|---|---|---|
| 1 | Michaela Gerg | West Germany | 31 | 25 | 6 |
| 2 | Anita Wachter | Austria | 25 | - | 25 |
| 3 | Michela Figini | Switzerland | 22 | 12 | 10 |
| | Petra Kronberger | Austria | 22 | 7 | 15 |
| | Cathy Chedal | France | 22 | 2 | 20 |
| 6 | Regine Mösenlechner | West Germany | 21 | 9 | 12 |
| 7 | Heidi Zeller | Switzerland | 20 | 20 | - |
| | Veronika Wallinger | Austria | 20 | 15 | 5 |
| 9 | Carole Merle | France | 14 | 10 | 4 |
| | Karin Dedler | West Germany | 14 | 6 | 8 |
| 11 | Catherine Quittet | France | 12 | - | 12 |
| 12 | Maria Walliser | Switzerland | 11 | 11 | - |
| 13 | Deborah Compagnoni | Italy | 9 | - | 9 |
| 14 | Barbara Sadleder | Austria | 8 | 8 | - |
| 15 | Edith Thys | United States | 7 | - | 7 |
| 16 | Sabine Ginther | Austria | 5 | 5 | - |
| 17 | Stefanie Schuster | Austria | 4 | 4 | - |
| | Claudine Emonet | France | 4 | 4 | - |
| 18 | Vreni Schneider | Switzerland | 3 | - | 3 |
| 19 | Heidi Zurbriggen | Switzerland | 2 | - | 2 |
| 20 | Lucie Laroche | Canada | 1 | - | 1 |
| | Kristi Terzian | United States | 1 | - | 1 |

== See also ==
- Cerro Catedral
- Cerro Castor
- Chapelco
- List of ski areas and resorts in South America
